= 2025 World Athletics Championships – Men's 3000 metres steeplechase =

Men's 3000 metres steeplechase at the 2025 World Athletics Championships
- Venue: National Stadium
- Location: Tokyo, Japan
- Dates: 13 September (heats); 14 September (final)
- Winning time: 8:33.88

Medalists
gold medal	Geordie Beamish	New Zealand
silver medal	Soufiane El Bakkali	Morocco
bronze medal	Edmund Serem	Kenya

The men's 3000 metres steeplechase at the 2025 World Athletics Championships was held at the National Stadium in Tokyo on 13 and 15 September 2025.

== Summary ==
Soufiane El Bakkali came in as the two time world champion looking for the threepeat. With the two Olympic golds, he has essentially dominated this event since 2020. He set the world leading time at home in May. World record holder Lamecha Girma was back, regaining race confidence after his concussion in the 2024 Olympics. He was the silver medalist behind El Bakkali in all those races and beat El Bakkali back to bronze in 2019, a race won by Conselus Kipruto, the last major championship won by a Kenyan. Abraham Kibiwot had two consecutive bronze medals in the last two major championships.

In the second qualifying heat Geordie Beamish tripped over the barrier and fell to the track. Jean-Simon Desgagnés tripped over him and also fell. Beamish got up immediately and managed to overtake most of those in front of him to finish second. Desgagnés finished a non-qualifying tenth place but was advanced to the final by the referee.

The final started very slowly with El Bakkali dropping to the back of the pack. With just over two laps to go, all 16 finalists were still in contention. Daniel Michalski took the lead as El Bakkali moved towards the front. Girma passed Michelski as they started the final lap, and with 200 metres to go El Bakkali also passed Michalski to move into second place. Local runner Ryuji Miura passed Michalski at the water jump. El Bakkali, passed Girma out of the water jump and started to open up a gap. After the final barrier El Bakkali started to ease up with an apparently safe margin. 20 metres before the finish, he sensed a challenge and tried to speed up again but was passed by Geordie Beamish a little over 10 metres from the finish. Beamish, who had been 11th at the Bell and eighth with 200 metres left, won by .07 in 8:33.88. After the final barrier 17 year old Edmund Serem sprinted through Miura, Girma, Salaheddine Ben Yazide and Samuel Firewu for the bronze. After the race, an upset El Bakkali was seen hitting himself in the head for not winning.

== Records ==
Before the competition records were as follows:

Record	Athlete & Nat.	Perf.	Location	Date
World record	Lamecha Girma (ETH)	7:52.11	Paris, France	9 June 2023
Championship record	Ezekiel Kemboi (KEN)	8:00.43	Berlin, Germany	18 August 2009
World Leading	Soufiane El Bakkali (MAR)	8:00.70	Rabat, Morocco	25 May 2025
African Record	Lamecha Girma (ETH)	7:52.11	Paris, France	9 June 2023
Asian Record	Saif Saaeed Shaheen (QAT)	7:53.63	Brussels, Belgium	3 September 2004
European Record	Mahiedine Mekhissi (FRA)	8:00.09	Paris, France	6 July 2013
North, Central American and Caribbean record	Evan Jager (USA)	8:00.45	Paris, France	4 July 2015
Oceanian record	George Beamish (NZL)	8:09.64	Paris, France	7 July 2024
South American Record	Wander do Prado Moura (BRA)	8:14.41	Mar del Plata, Argentina	22 March 1995

== Qualification standard ==
The standard to qualify automatically for entry was 8:15.00.

== Schedule ==
The event schedule, in local time (UTC+9), was as follows:

Date	Time	Round
13 September	18:05	Heats
15 September	21:55	Final

== Results ==
=== Heats ===
The heats took place on 13 September. The first five athletes in each heat ( Q ) qualified for the final.

==== Heat 1 ====
Place	Athlete	Nation	Time	Notes
1	Edmund Serem	Kenya	8:29.97	Q
2	Getnet Wale	Ethiopia	8:30.14	Q
3	Ryuji Miura	Japan	8:30.43	Q
4	Nicolas-Marie Daru	France	8:30.64	Q
5	Ahmed Jaziri	Tunisia	8:31.41	Q
6	Karl Bebendorf	Germany	8:32.27	
7	Ala Zoghlami	Italy	8:32.65	
8	Isaac Updike	United States	8:33.46	
9	Mohamed Tindouft	Morocco	8:35.73	
10	Alejandro Quijada	Spain	8:42.30	
11	Faid El Mostafa	Morocco	8:44.10	
12	Edward Trippas	Australia	8:46.51	

==== Heat 2 ====
Place	Athlete	Nation	Time	Notes
1	Salaheddine Ben Yazide	Morocco	8:27.21	Q
2	Geordie Beamish	New Zealand	8:27.23	Q
3	Samuel Firewu	Ethiopia	8:27.54	Q
4	Frederik Ruppert	Germany	8:27.83	Q
5	Abraham Kibiwot	Kenya	8:27.84	Q
6	Mohamed Amin Jhinaoui	Tunisia	8:27.89	
7	Louis Gilavert	France	8:28.90	
8	Leo Magnusson	Sweden	8:31.66	
9	Leonard Chemutai	Uganda	8:33.24	
10	Jean-Simon Desgagnés	Canada	8:36.58	qR
11	Kenneth Rooks	United States	8:45.57	
12	Nahuel Carabaña	Andorra	8:49.01	

==== Heat 3 ====
Place	Athlete	Nation	Time	Notes
1	Soufiane El Bakkali	Morocco	8:26.99	Q
2	Lamecha Girma	Ethiopia	8:27.79	Q
3	Daniel Michalski	United States	8:28.76	Q
4	Ruben Querinjean	Luxembourg	8:29.42	Q
5	Niklas Buchholz	Germany	8:29.53	Q
6	Vidar Johansson	Sweden	8:31.31	
7	Simon Koech	Kenya	8:31.80	
8	Djilali Bedrani	France	8:35.50	
9	Etson Barros	Portugal	8:38.58	
10	Carlos San Martín	Colombia	9:02.20	
11	Tim Van de Velde	Belgium	9:02.21	
—	Daniel Arce	Spain	DNF	

=== Final ===
Place	Athlete	Nation	Time	Notes
1st place, gold medalist(s)	Geordie Beamish	New Zealand	8:33.88	
2nd place, silver medalist(s)	Soufiane El Bakkali	Morocco	8:33.95	
3rd place, bronze medalist(s)	Edmund Serem	Kenya	8:34.56	
4	Samuel Firewu	Ethiopia	8:34.68	
5	Salaheddine Ben Yazide	Morocco	8:35.16	
6	Lamecha Girma	Ethiopia	8:35.60	
7	Nicolas-Marie Daru	France	8:35.77	
8	Ryuji Miura	Japan	8:35.90	
9	Daniel Michalski	United States	8:37.12	
10	Ruben Querinjean	Luxembourg	8:37.49	
11	Ahmed Jaziri	Tunisia	8:39.30	
12	Frederik Ruppert	Germany	8:39.83	
13	Jean-Simon Desgagnés	Canada	8:39.96	
14	Getnet Wale	Ethiopia	8:41.23	
15	Niklas Buchholz	Germany	8:42.81	
—	Abraham Kibiwot	Kenya	DNF	
