= 2026 European Athletics Championships – Men's 3000 metres steeplechase =

Men's 3000 metres steeplechase at the 2026 European Athletics Championships
- Venue: Alexander Stadium
- Location: Birmingham, United Kingdom
- Dates: 13 August 2026 (round 1); 16 August 2026 (final)
- Competitors: 34 (target)
- Winning time: 8:25.33

Medalists
gold medal	Frederik Ruppert	Germany
silver medal	Ruben Querinjean	Luxembourg
bronze medal	Karl Bebendorf	Germany

The men's 3000 metres steeplechase at the 2026 European Athletics Championships took place in two rounds at the Alexander Stadium in Birmingham, United Kingdom, on 13 and 16 August 2026.

== Background ==
Records before the 2026 European Athletics Championships
Record	Athlete (nation)	Time	Location	Date
World record	Lamecha Girma (ETH)	7:52.11	Paris, France	9 June 2023
World leading	Soufiane El Bakkali (MAR)	7:57.25	Rabat, Morocco	31 May 2026
European record	Frederik Ruppert (GER)	7:57.80	Rabat, Morocco	31 May 2026
European leading	Frederik Ruppert (GER)	7:57.80	Rabat, Morocco	31 May 2026
Championship record	Mahiedine Mekhissi (FRA)	8:07.87	Barcelona, Spain	1 August 2010

== Qualification ==
For the men's 3000 metres steeplechase, the qualification period was from 27 July 2025 to 26 July 2026. Athletes qualified by running the entry standard of 8:20.00 min or faster, by wildcard for the 2024 European Athletics Champion, or by their position on the World Athletics Rankings for the event. The target number was 34 athletes.

Qualification standings per 31 July 2026
QP	CP	Country	Athlete	Status	Details
1	1	France	Alexis Miellet	Qualified by Wild Card	Defending European Champion
2	1	Germany	Frederik Ruppert	Qualified by Entry Standard	7:57.80 - Complexe Sportif Prince Moulay Abdellah, Rabat (MAR) - 31 MAY 2026
3	2	Germany	Karl Bebendorf	Qualified by Entry Standard	8:05.55 - Stade Charléty, Paris (FRA) - 28 JUN 2026
4	1	Luxembourg	Ruben Querinjean	Qualified by Entry Standard	8:09.47 - Boudewijnstadion, Bruxelles (BEL) - 22 AUG 2025
5	1	Spain	Daniel Arce	Qualified by Entry Standard	8:11.42 - Complexe Sportif Prince Moulay Abdellah, Rabat (MAR) - 31 MAY 2026
6	2	France	Nicolas-Marie Daru	Qualified by Entry Standard	8:11.81 - Complexe Sportif Prince Moulay Abdellah, Rabat (MAR) - 31 MAY 2026
7	3	France	Baptiste Fourmont	Qualified by Entry Standard	8:12.10 - Putbosstadion, Oordegem (BEL) - 09 AUG 2025
8	1	Andorra	Nahuel Carabaña	Qualified by Entry Standard	8:12.80 - Putbosstadion, Oordegem (BEL) - 09 AUG 2025
9	1	Italy	Osama Zoghlami	Qualified by Entry Standard	8:13.10 - Mestský Stadion, Ostrava (CZE) - 16 JUN 2026
10	2	Spain	Alejandro Quijada	Qualified by Entry Standard	8:13.40 - Putbosstadion, Oordegem (BEL) - 09 AUG 2025
11	3	Germany	Niklas Buchholz	Qualified by Entry Standard	8:14.05 - Putbosstadion, Oordegem (BEL) - 09 AUG 2025
12	1	Belgium	Tim Van de Velde	Qualified by Entry Standard	8:14.40 - Boudewijnstadion, Bruxelles (BEL) - 22 AUG 2025
13	1	Sweden	Vidar Johansson	Qualified by Entry Standard	8:15.00 - Putbosstadion, Oordegem (BEL) - 09 AUG 2025
14	2	Sweden	Leo Magnusson	Qualified by Entry Standard	8:15.02 - Putbosstadion, Oordegem (BEL) - 09 AUG 2025
15	1	Great Britain & N.I.	Zak Seddon	Qualified by Entry Standard	8:15.66 - Putbosstadion, Oordegem (BEL) - 09 AUG 2025
16	3	Sweden	Simon Sundström	Qualified by Entry Standard	8:17.01 - Putbosstadion, Oordegem (BEL) - 09 AUG 2025
17	4	France	Oscar Thebaud	Qualified by Entry Standard	8:17.40 - Mestský Stadion, Ostrava (CZE) - 16 JUN 2026
18	2	Belgium	Rémi Schyns	Qualified by Entry Standard	8:17.46 - Mestský Stadion, Ostrava (CZE) - 16 JUN 2026
reserve	5	France	Pierre Boudy	Qualified by Entry Standard	8:18.65 - Parc des Sports C. Ehrmann, Nice (FRA) - 13 JUN 2026
19	2	Great Britain & N.I.	Kristian Imroth	Qualified by Entry Standard	8:18.97 - Alexander Stadium, Birmingham (GBR) - 21 JUN 2026
20	1	Poland	Maciej Megier	Qualified by World Rankings	21st - 1178 points
21	2	Italy	Ala Zoghlami	Qualified by World Rankings	22nd - 1178 points
22	1	Portugal	Lourenço Rodrigues	Qualified by World Rankings	25th - 1172 points
23	3	Great Britain & N.I.	William Battershill	Qualified by World Rankings	29th - 1167 points
24	1	Hungary	István Palkovits	Qualified by World Rankings	30th - 1164 points
25	3	Italy	Yassin Bouih	Qualified by World Rankings	31st - 1159 points
26	1	Norway	Jacob Bouttera	Qualified by World Rankings	35th - 1154 points
reserve	4	Italy	Enrico Vecchi	Qualified by World Rankings	36th - 1150 points
27	1	Austria	Tobias Rattinger	Qualified by World Rankings	38th - 1146 points
28	1	Switzerland	Aarno Liebl	Qualified by World Rankings	40th - 1144 points
29	2	Poland	Adam Bajorski	Qualified by World Rankings	41st - 1141 points
30	1	Turkey	Cuma Özcan	Qualified by World Rankings	43rd - 1139 points
31	2	Turkey	Abdullah Tuğluk	Qualified by World Rankings	50th - 1132 points
reserve	5	Italy	Giovanni Gatto	Qualified by World Rankings	56th - 1125 points
32	2	Portugal	Leandro Monteiro	Qualified by World Rankings	57th - 1124 points
33	1	Croatia	Bruno Belčić	Qualified by World Rankings	59th - 1120 points
34	2	Switzerland	Camilo Irarragorri	Qualified by World Rankings	74th - 1083 points

Bye to semi-finals	Reserve activated	Withdrawal / reserve unused

== Schedule ==
Date	Time	Round
13 August 2026	11:30	Round 1
16 August 2026	20:50	Final

All times are local times (UTC+1)

== Results ==
=== Round 1 ===
Round 1 was held on 13 August 2026, at 11:30 in the morning. First 8 in each heat (Q) advanced to the final.

==== Heat 1 ====
Place	Athlete	Nation	Time	Notes
1	Osama Zoghlami	Italy	8:34.52	Q
2	Nicolas-Marie Daru	France	8:34.60	Q
3	Frederik Ruppert	Germany	8:35.46	Q
4	Pierre Boudy	France	8:35.82	Q
5	Niklas Buchholz	Germany	8:35.90	Q
6	Kristian Imroth	Great Britain & N.I.	8:36.20	Q
7	Alejandro Quijada	Spain	8:36.92	Q
8	William Battershill	Great Britain & N.I.	8:37.33	Q
9	Aarno Liebl	Switzerland	8:42.01	
10	Abdullah Tuğluk	Turkey	8:43.77	
11	Tobias Rattinger	Austria	8:43.77	
12	Adam Bajorski	Poland	8:49.87	
13	Lourenço Rodrigues	Portugal	8:54.62	
14	Nahuel Carabaña	Andorra	8:57.80	SB
15	Tim Van de Velde	Belgium	8:59.67	
16	István Palkovits	Hungary	8:59.72	
—	Simon Sundström	Sweden	DNF	

==== Heat 2 ====
Place	Athlete	Nation	Time	Notes
1	Daniel Arce	Spain	8:34.47	Q
2	Remi Schyns	Belgium	8:34.63	Q
3	Baptiste Fourmont	France	8:34.64	Q
4	Ruben Querinjean	Luxembourg	8:35.07	Q
5	Leo Magnusson	Sweden	8:35.12	Q
6	Karl Bebendorf	Germany	8:35.26	Q
7	Yassin Bouih	Italy	8:36.25	Q
8	Ala Zoghlami	Italy	8:36.52	Q
9	Zak Seddon	Great Britain & N.I.	8:37.24	q
10	Alexis Miellet	France	8:40.18	
11	Leandro Monteiro	Portugal	8:45.79	
12	Jacob Boutera	Norway	8:49.44	SB
13	Maciej Megier	Poland	8:53.17	
14	Camilo Irarragorri	Switzerland	8:56.39	
15	Cuma Özcan	Turkey	8:59.34	
16	Bruno Belčić	Croatia	9:00.76	
—	Vidar Johansson	Sweden	DNF	

=== Final ===
The final was held on 16 August 2026, at 20:50 in the evening.

Place	Athlete	Nation	Time	Notes
1st place, gold medalist(s)	Frederik Ruppert	Germany	8:25.33	
2nd place, silver medalist(s)	Ruben Querinjean	Luxembourg	8:25.61	
3rd place, bronze medalist(s)	Karl Bebendorf	Germany	8:26.65	
4	Daniel Arce	Spain	8:27.02	
5	Pierre Boudy	France	8:28.90	
6	Alejandro Quijada	Spain	8:29.15	
7	Remi Schyns	Belgium	8:29.25	
8	Nicolas-Marie Daru	France	8:29.46	
9	Niklas Buchholz	Germany	8:31.08	
10	Leo Magnusson	Sweden	8:32.87	
11	Osama Zoghlami	Italy	8:33.25	
12	Kristian Imroth	Great Britain & N.I.	8:33.89	
13	Ala Zoghlami	Italy	8:34.65	
14	William Battershill	Great Britain & N.I.	8:34.73	
15	Zak Seddon	Great Britain & N.I.	8:35.83	
16	Yassin Bouih	Italy	8:36.15	
	Baptiste Fourmont	France	DNS	
