= 2023 World Athletics Championships – Men's 3000 metres steeplechase =

Men's 3000 metres steeplechase at the 2023 World Championships
- Venue: National Athletics Centre
- Dates: 19 August (heats); 22 August (final)
- Competitors: 44 from 22 nations
- Winning time: 8:03.53

Medalists
gold medal	Soufiane El Bakkali	Morocco
silver medal	Lamecha Girma	Ethiopia
bronze medal	Abraham Kibiwot	Kenya

The men's 3000 metres steeplechase at the 2023 World Athletics Championships was held at the National Athletics Centre in Budapest from 19 to 22 August 2023.

== Summary ==
Defending champion Soufiane El Bakkali had taken residence on the podium since 2017, including the 2020 Olympics. Lamecha Girma had taken silver twice in a row and another at the Olympics. The difference this year was that Girma had taken down Saif Saaeed Shaheen's world record in Paris just over a month earlier. And he didn't just nip the record, he took a second and a half out of it, uncontested.

Nobody wanted to take the lead, that duty relegated to Simon Sundström in a pedestrian 67 first lap. But that wasn't slow enough so Leonard Bett slowed it down to a 69 and then 66's to get the field through 5 laps. Girma was always lurking about second place, now it was time to start racing. The next lap was just over 60 seconds. After spending a couple of laps at the back of the pack, El Bakkali drifted up to mark Girma. When the speed came, only Abraham Kibiwot was able to go with the big two. By the bell, he too had lost contact. On the first barrier after the bell, Kibiwot crashed. Nobody else was left in the picture. It wasn't the kind of breakaway speed the days of Ezekiel Kemboi, but El Bakkali pushed the backstretch to pull even with Girma with 200 to go. He opened up a step going in to the last water jump and continued to pull away. Even though El Bakkali slowed to wave at the crowd as he crossed the finish line, he still won by 10 metres. Far adrift from the leaders, Kibiwot came back to outsprint Bett to get the bronze. Including the Olympics it was three global championships in a row to have El Bakkali first, Girma second and a Kenyan in third.

== Records ==
Before the competition records were as follows:

Record	Athlete & Nat.	Perf.	Location	Date
World record	Lamecha Girma (ETH)	7:52.11	Paris, France	9 June 2023
Championship record	Ezekiel Kemboi (KEN)	8:00.43	Berlin, Germany	18 August 2009
World Leading	Lamecha Girma (ETH)	7:52.11	Paris, France	9 June 2023
African Record	Lamecha Girma (ETH)	7:52.11	Paris, France	9 June 2023
Asian Record	Saif Saaeed Shaheen (QAT)	7:53.63	Brussels, Belgium	3 September 2004
North, Central American and Caribbean record	Evan Jager (USA)	8:00.45	Paris, France	4 July 2015
South American Record	Wander do Prado Moura (BRA)	8:14.41	Mar del Plata, Argentina	22 March 1995
European Record	Mahiedine Mekhissi (FRA)	8:00.09	Paris, France	6 July 2013
Oceanian record	George Beamish (NZL)	8:13.61	Monte Carlo, Monaco	21 July 2023

The following records were set at the competition:

Record	Perf.	Athlete	Nat.	Date
Oceanian record	8:13.46	George Beamish	New Zealand	22 Aug 2023

== Qualification standard ==
The standard to qualify automatically for entry was 8:15.00.

== Schedule ==
The event schedule, in local time (UTC+2), was as follows:

Date	Time	Round
19 August	12:35	Heats
22 August	21:42	Final

== Results ==
=== Heats ===
The first 5 athletes in each heat (Q) qualify to the final.

Rank	Heat	Name	Nationality	Time	Notes
1	3	Lamecha Girma	Ethiopia	8:15.89	Q
2	3	George Beamish	New Zealand	8:16.36	Q
3	3	Leonard Kipkemoi Bett	Kenya	8:16.74	Q
4	3	Ryuji Miura	Japan	8:18.73	Q
5	1	Getnet Wale	Ethiopia	8:19.99	Q
6	1	Jean-Simon Desgagnés	Canada	8:20.04	Q
7	3	Simon Sundström	Sweden	8:20.10	Q, PB
8	1	Simon Kiprop Koech	Kenya	8:20.29	Q
9	1	Daniel Arce	Spain	8:20.46	Q
10	1	Ryoma Aoki	Japan	8:20.54	Q, SB
11	3	Victor Ruiz	Spain	8:20.54	
12	1	Mohamed Tindouft	Morocco	8:20.67	
13	3	Djilali Bedrani	France	8:20.69	
14	1	Avinash Mukund Sable	India	8:22.24	
15	3	Karl Bebendorf	Germany	8:22.33	
16	3	Mohammed Msaad	Morocco	8:22.95	
17	2	Kenneth Rooks	United States	8:23.66	Q
18	2	Soufiane El Bakkali	Morocco	8:23.66	Q
19	2	Mohamed Amin Jhinaoui	Tunisia	8:24.20	Q
20	1	Benard Keter	United States	8:24.20	
21	2	Abraham Kibiwot	Kenya	8:24.31	Q
22	2	Leonard Chemutai	Uganda	8:24.74	Q
23	2	Nahuel Carabaña	Andorra	8:27.05	
24	1	Vidar Johansson	Sweden	8:27.21	
25	3	Ala Zoghlami	Italy	8:28.76	
26	2	István Palkovits	Hungary	8:29.37	
27	1	Ahmed Jaziri	Tunisia	8:29.81	
28	1	Topi Raitanen	Finland	8:30.69	
29	2	Abrham Sime	Ethiopia	8:31.49	
30	3	Isaac Updike	United States	8:31.81	qR
31	2	Osama Zoghlami	Italy	8:33.07	
32	2	Salaheddine Ben Yazide	Morocco	8:38.14	
33	2	Seiya Sunada	Japan	8:38.59	
34	3	Fouad Idbafdil	Athlete Refugee Team	8:39.21	
35	1	Matthew Clarke	Australia	8:40.92	
36	2	Emil Blomberg	Sweden	8:42.33	
37	3	Julián Molina	Argentina	8:46.44	

=== Final ===
The final was started on 22 August at 21:42.

Rank	Name	Nationality	Time	Notes
1st place, gold medalist(s)	Soufiane El Bakkali	Morocco	8:03.53	
2nd place, silver medalist(s)	Lamecha Girma	Ethiopia	8:05.44	
3rd place, bronze medalist(s)	Abraham Kibiwot	Kenya	8:11.98	
4	Leonard Kipkemoi Bett	Kenya	8:12.26	
5	George Beamish	New Zealand	8:13.46	
6	Ryuji Miura	Japan	8:13.70	
7	Simon Kiprop Koech	Kenya	8:14.37	
8	Jean-Simon Desgagnés	Canada	8:15.58	PB
9	Daniel Arce	Spain	8:18.31	
10	Kenneth Rooks	United States	8:20.02	
11	Getnet Wale	Ethiopia	8:21.03	
12	Leonard Chemutai	Uganda	8:21.61	
13	Mohamed Amin Jhinaoui	Tunisia	8:23.08	
14	Ryoma Aoki	Japan	8:24.77	
15	Simon Sundström	Sweden	8:27.68	
16	Isaac Updike	United States	8:30.67	
