= 2022 European Athletics Championships – Men's 3000 metres steeplechase =

Men's 3000 metres steeplechase at the 2022 European Athletics Championships
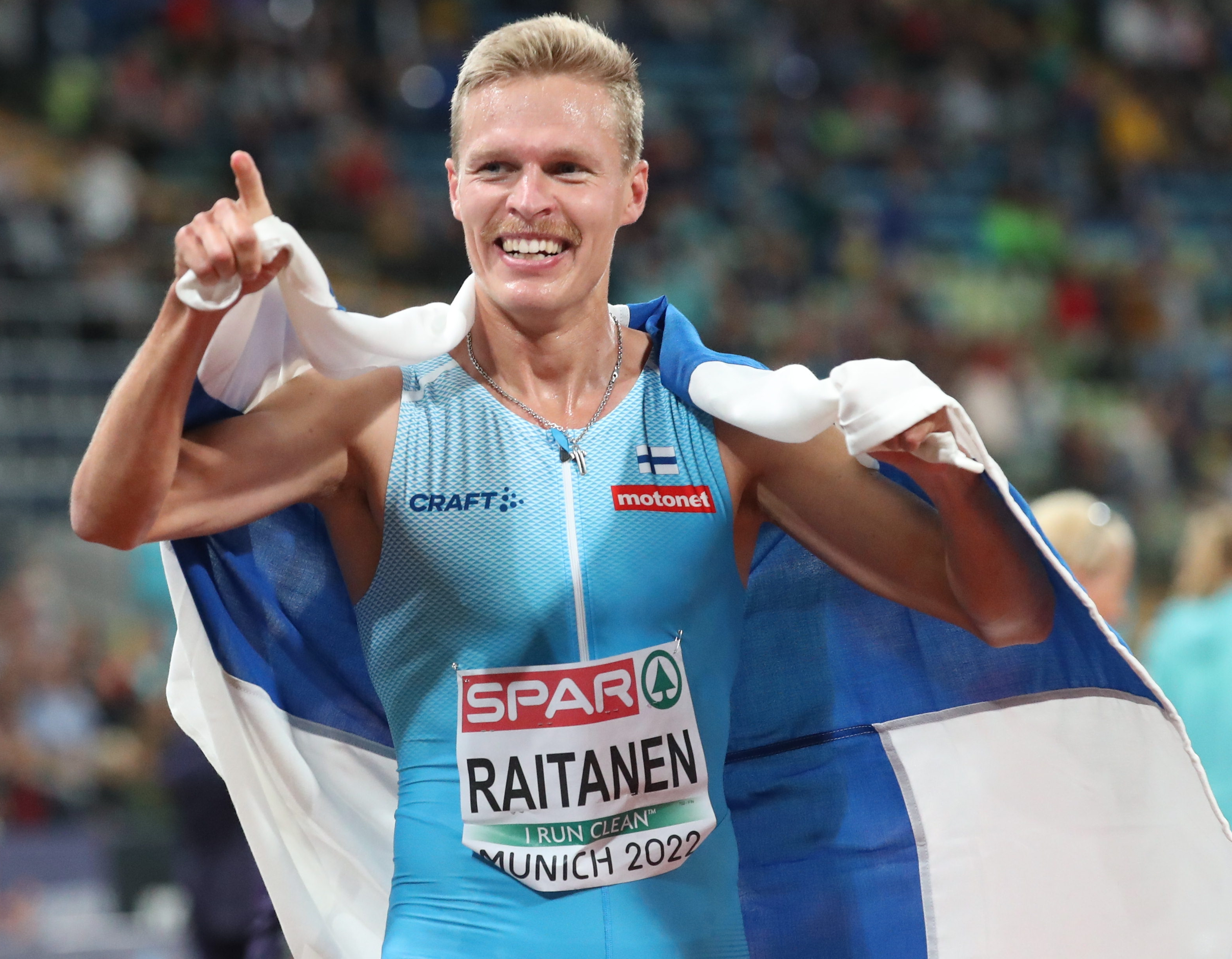
- Venue: Olympiastadion
- Location: Munich
- Dates: 16 August (heats); 19 August (final)
- Competitors: 34 from 16 nations
- Winning time: 8:21.80

Medalists
| gold medal | Topi Raitanen | Finland |
| silver medal | Osama Zoghlami | Italy |
| bronze medal | Daniel Arce | Spain |

The men's 3000 metres steeplechase at the 2022 European Athletics Championships took place at the Olympiastadion on 16 and 19 August.

== Records ==
Standing records prior to the 2022 European Athletics Championships
| World record | Saif Saaeed Shaheen (QAT) | 7:53.63 | Brussels, Belgium | 3 September 2004 |
| European record | Mahiedine Mekhissi-Benabbad (FRA) | 8:00.09 | Paris, France | 6 July 2013 |
| Championship record | Mahiedine Mekhissi-Benabbad (FRA) | 8:07.87 | Barcelona, Spain | 1 August 2010 |
| World Leading | Soufiane El Bakkali (MAR) | 7:58.28 | Rabat, Morocco | 5 June 2022 |
| Europe Leading | Ahmed Abdelwahed (ITA) | 8:10.29 | Rome, Italy | 9 June 2022 |

== Schedule ==
| Date | Time | Round |
|---|---|---|
| 16 August 2022 | 11:40 | Heats |
| 19 August 2022 | 21:00 | Final |

All times are local times (UTC+2)

== Results ==
=== Heats ===
First 5 in each heat (Q) and the next 5 fastest (q) advance to the Final.

| Rank | Heat | Name | Nationality | Time | Note |
|---|---|---|---|---|---|
| 1 | 1 | Osama Zoghlami | Italy | 8:30.67 | Q |
| 2 | 2 | Ahmed Abdelwahed | Italy | 8:30.92 | Q |
| 3 | 2 | Jacob Boutera | Norway | 8:31.03 | Q |
| 4 | 1 | Karl Bebendorf | Germany | 8:31.67 | Q |
| 5 | 2 | Phil Norman | Great Britain | 8:32.00 | Q |
| 6 | 1 | Tom Erling Kårbø | Norway | 8:32.22 | Q |
| 7 | 1 | Louis Gilavert | France | 8:32.26 | Q |
| 8 | 2 | Daniel Arce | Spain | 8:32.27 | Q |
| 9 | 1 | Víctor Ruiz | Spain | 8:32.48 | Q |
| 10 | 1 | Ala Zoghlami | Italy | 8:32.82 | q |
| 11 | 2 | Topi Raitanen | Finland | 8:33.51 | Q |
| 12 | 2 | Niklas Buchholz | Germany | 8:33.89 | q |
| 13 | 1 | Sebastián Martos | Spain | 8:34.19 | q |
| 14 | 1 | Emil Blomberg | Sweden | 8:35.22 | q |
| 15 | 2 | Djilali Bedrani | France | 8:35.57 | q |
| 16 | 2 | Etson Barros | Portugal | 8:38.04 | |
| 17 | 2 | Tim Van de Velde | Belgium | 8:38.23 | |
| 18 | 1 | Vidar Johansson | Sweden | 8:38.42 | |
| 19 | 1 | Jamaine Coleman | Great Britain | 8:39.22 | |
| 20 | 1 | István Palkovits | Hungary | 8:40.47 | |
| 21 | 1 | Damián Vích | Czech Republic | 8:41.43 | |
| 22 | 2 | Mehdi Belhadj | France | 8:42.38 | |
| 23 | 1 | Hillary Yego | Turkey | 8:43.76 | |
| 24 | 2 | Zak Seddon | Great Britain | 8:46.74 | |
| 25 | 2 | Simon Sundström | Sweden | 8:50.30 | |
| 26 | 1 | Michael Curti | Switzerland | 8:56.46 | |
| 27 | 1 | Simão Bastos | Portugal | 8:57.27 | |
| 28 | 2 | Frederik Ruppert | Germany | 9:01.93 | |
| 29 | 2 | Jakob Dybdal Abrahamsen | Denmark | 9:05.26 | |
| 30 | 2 | Fredrik Sandvik | Norway | 9:05.47 | |
| 31 | 2 | Rémi Schyns | Belgium | 9:21.85 | |
| 32 | 1 | Nahuel Carabaña | Andorra | 9:37.74 | |
| | 1 | Axel Vang Christensen | Denmark | DNF | |
| | 2 | Miguel Borges | Portugal | DNF | |

=== Final ===
| Rank | Name | Nationality | Time | Note |
|---|---|---|---|---|
| 1st place, gold medalist(s) | Topi Raitanen | Finland | 8:21.80 | |
| — | ~~Ahmed Abdelwahed~~ | Italy | ~~8:22.35~~ | |
| 2nd place, silver medalist(s) | Osama Zoghlami | Italy | 8:23.44 | |
| 3rd place, bronze medalist(s) | Daniel Arce | Spain | 8:25.00 | |
| 4 | Karl Bebendorf | Germany | 8:26.49 | |
| 5 | Sebastián Martos | Spain | 8:26.68 | |
| 6 | Ala Zoghlami | Italy | 8:27.82 | |
| 7 | Djilali Bedrani | France | 8:28.52 | |
| 8 | Phil Norman | Great Britain | 8:33.05 | |
| 9 | Emil Blomberg | Sweden | 8:33.09 | |
| 10 | Jacob Boutera | Norway | 8:33.38 | |
| 11 | Tom Erling Kårbø | Norway | 8:33.57 | |
| 12 | Víctor Ruiz | Spain | 8:37.24 | |
| 13 | Niklas Buchholz | Germany | 8:37.51 | |
| 14 | Louis Gilavert | France | 8:39.62 | |
