= Andorra at the 2022 European Athletics Championships =

- Flag of Andorra
- WA code: AND
- National federation: Andorran Athletics Federation

in Munich, Germany 15 August 2022 – 21 August 2022
- Competitors: 1 (1 man) in 1 event
- Medals: Gold 0 Silver 0 Bronze 0 Total 0

European Athletics Championships appearances
- 1998; 2002; 2006; 2010; 2012; 2014; 2016; 2018; 2022; 2024

Andorra competed at the 2022 European Championships in Munich from August 15 to August 22, 2022.

== Results ==
Andorra entered the following athletes.

Men
Track and road

Athlete	Event	Heats		Semifinal		Final	
Athlete	Event	Result	Rank	Result	Rank	Result	Rank
Nahuel Carabaña	3000 m steeplechase	9:37.74	32	—		did not advance	

== See also ==
- Andorra at the 2022 European Championships
