= 2024 European Athletics Championships – Men's 3000 metres steeplechase =

Men's 3000 metres steeplechase at the 2024 European Athletics Championships
- Venue: Stadio Olimpico
- Location: Rome
- Dates: 8 June (heats); 10 June (final)
- Competitors: 34 from 18 nations
- Winning time: 8:14.01 PB

Medalists
gold medal	Alexis Miellet	France
silver medal	Djilali Bedrani	France
bronze medal	Karl Bebendorf	Germany

The men's 3000 metres steeplechase at the 2024 European Athletics Championships took place at the Stadio Olimpico from 8 to 10 June.

== Records ==
Standing records prior to the 2024 European Athletics Championships
World record	Lamecha Girma (ETH)	7:52.11	Paris, France	9 June 2023
European record	Mahiedine Mekhissi (FRA)	8:00.09	Saint-Denis, France	6 July 2013
Championship record	Mahiedine Mekhissi (FRA)	8:07.87	Barcelona, Spain	1 August 2010
World Leading	Lamecha Girma (ETH)	8:01.63	Stockholm, Sweden	2 June 2024
Europe Leading	Daniel Arce (ESP)	8:12.26	Marrakesh, Morocco	19 May 2024

== Schedule ==
Date	Time	Round
8 June 2024	10:10	Round 1
10 June 2024	22:00	Final

All times are local times (UTC+2)

== Results ==
=== Round 1 ===
First 8 in each heat (Q) advance to the Final.

Rank	Heat	Name	Nationality	Time	Note
1	2	Daniel Arce	Spain	8:21.46	Q
2	2	Frederik Ruppert	Germany	8:21.49	Q
3	2	Alexis Miellet	France	8:22.19	Q
4	2	Vidar Johansson	Sweden	8:22.21	Q
5	2	Topi Raitanen	Finland	8:22.42	Q
6	2	Nahuel Carabaña	Andorra	8:22.44	Q
7	2	Emil Blomberg	Sweden	8:22.85	Q
8	2	Tomáš Habarta	Czech Republic	8:23.96	Q, NU23R
9	2	Fredrik Sandvik	Norway	8:28.47	SB
10	2	Zak Seddon	Great Britain	8:28.50	
11	2	Ruben Querinjean	Luxembourg	8:29.07	
12	2	Ala Zoghlami	Italy	8:31.88	
13	1	Djilali Bedrani	France	8:33.63	Q
14	1	Velten Schneider	Germany	8:34.00	Q
15	1	Nicolas-Marie Daru	France	8:34.03	Q
16	1	Yassin Bouih	Italy	8:34.06	Q
17	1	Karl Bebendorf	Germany	8:34.11	Q
18	1	Damián Vích	Czech Republic	8:34.27	Q
19	1	Osama Zoghlami	Italy	8:34.31	Q
20	1	Mark Pearce	Great Britain	8:34.46	Q
21	1	Simon Sundström	Sweden	8:34.59	
22	2	Michael Curti	Switzerland	8:35.34	
23	1	Jacob Boutera	Norway	8:38.22	
24	1	Ole Hesselbjerg	Denmark	8:38.99	
25	1	Tom Erling Kårbø	Norway	8:39.99	
26	1	Tobias Rattinger	Austria	8:44.60	
27	1	Alejandro Quijada	Spain	8:46.70	
28	1	István Palkovits	Hungary	8:47.32	
29	2	Etson Barros	Portugal	8:55.33	
30	2	Abdullah Tuğluk	Turkey	8:56.54	
	1	Clément Deflandre	Belgium	DNF	
	1	Rémi Schyns	Belgium	DNF	
	2	Tim van de Velde	Belgium	DNF	
	2	Fernando Carro	Spain	DNF	

=== Final ===
The final started on 10 June at 22:00.

Rank	Name	Nationality	Time	Note
1st place, gold medalist(s)	Alexis Miellet	France	8:14.01	PB
2nd place, silver medalist(s)	Djilali Bedrani	France	8:14.36	
3rd place, bronze medalist(s)	Karl Bebendorf	Germany	8:14.41	PB
4	Frederik Ruppert	Germany	8:15.08	PB
5	Daniel Arce	Spain	8:16.70	
6	Nicolas-Marie Daru	France	8:19.42	
7	Nahuel Carabaña	Andorra	8:21.08	
8	Osama Zoghlami	Italy	8:21.09	
9	Vidar Johansson	Sweden	8:21.54	
10	Tomáš Habarta	Czech Republic	8:21.83	EU23L, NR
11	Emil Blomberg	Sweden	8:22.92	
12	Damián Vích	Czech Republic	8:22.95	PB
13	Mark Pearce	Great Britain	8:26.92	
14	Yassin Bouih	Italy	8:27.29	
15	Topi Raitanen	Finland	8:32.37	
16	Velten Schneider	Germany	8:38.73	
