= Andorra at the 2024 European Athletics Championships =

- Flag of Andorra
- WA code: AND

in Rome, Italy 7 June 2024 – 12 June 2022
- Competitors: 1 (1 man)

European Athletics Championships appearances
- 1998; 2002; 2006; 2010; 2012; 2014; 2016; 2018; 2022; 2024

Andorra competed at the 2024 European Athletics Championships in Rome, Italy from 7–12 June 2024.

== Medallists ==
Medal	Name	Event	Date

== Results ==
Andorra entered the following athlete.

Key

- Q = Qualified for the next round
- q = Qualified for the next round as a fastest loser or, in field events, by position without achieving the qualifying target
- NR = National record
- PB = Personal best
- SB = Season best
- N/A = Round not applicable for the event

=== Men ===
Track and road events

Athlete	Event	Heat		Semifinal		Final	
Athlete	Event	Result	Rank	Result	Rank	Result	Rank
Nahuel Carabaña	3000 metres steeplechase	8:22.44	6 Q	—		8:21.08	7
