= 2025 Weltklasse Zürich =

Athletics meeting in Zürich, Switzerland

- Dates: 27–28 August 2025
- Host city: Zurich, Switzerland
- Venue: Letzigrund, Sechseläutenplatz
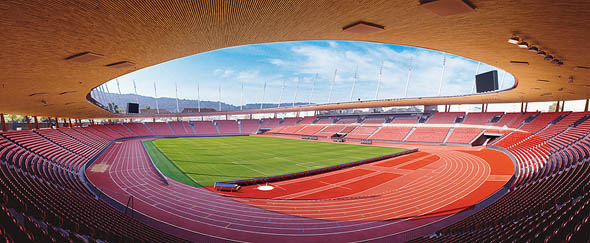
- Level: 2025 Diamond League

The 2025 Weltklasse Zürich was the 64th edition of the annual outdoor track and field meeting held in Zurich. Held on 27 and 28 August, it was the fifteenth leg and served as the finals of the 2025 Diamond League – the highest-level international track and field circuit. The men’s and women’s pole vault, women’s high jump, men’s long jump and men’s and women’s shot put took place at Sechseläutenplatz on the first day of competition, with all remaining events held the following day at Letzigrund.

== Diamond+ events results ==
Starting in 2025 a new discipline of events was added called Diamond+, these 8 events during the finals awarded athletes with increased prize money.

=== Men's ===
100 metres
Place	Athlete	Nation	Time	Notes
1st place, gold medalist(s)	Christian Coleman	United States	9.97	
2nd place, silver medalist(s)	Akani Simbine	South Africa	9.98	
3rd place, bronze medalist(s)	Ackeem Blake	Jamaica	9.99	
4	Jeremiah Azu	Great Britain	10.03	
5	Brandon Hicklin	United States	10.09	
6	Trayvon Bromell	United States	10.14	
7	Shaun Maswanganyi	South Africa	10.19	
8	Bayanda Walaza	South Africa	12.10	
			Wind: (−0.4 m/s)	

1500 metres
Place	Athlete	Nation	Time	Notes
1st place, gold medalist(s)	Niels Laros	Netherlands	3:29.20	NR
2nd place, silver medalist(s)	Reynold Cheruiyot	Kenya	3:29.91	PB
3rd place, bronze medalist(s)	Phanuel Koech	Kenya	3:30.02	
4	Timothy Cheruiyot	Kenya	3:30.13	
5	Azeddine Habz	France	3:30.39	
6	Anass Essayi	Morocco	3:30.67	PB
7	Yared Nuguse	United States	3:30.84	
8	Samuel Pihlström	Sweden	3:31.15	
9	Robert Farken	Germany	3:31.30	
10	Isaac Nader	Portugal	3:35.70	
—	Filip Rak	Poland	DNF	PM
—	Žan Rudolf	Slovenia	DNF	PM

400 metres hurdles
Place	Athlete	Nation	Time	Notes
1st place, gold medalist(s)	Karsten Warholm	Norway	46.70	MR
2nd place, silver medalist(s)	Abderrahman Samba	Qatar	47.45	
3rd place, bronze medalist(s)	Ezekiel Nathaniel	Nigeria	47.56	
4	CJ Allen	United States	48.00	SB
5	Matheus Lima	Brazil	48.21	
6	Trevor Bassitt	United States	48.29	
7	Alastair Chalmers	Great Britain	48.88	
8	Berke Akçam	Turkey	49.01	

Pole vault
Place	Athlete	Nation	Height	Notes
1st place, gold medalist(s)	Armand Duplantis	Sweden	6.00 m	
2nd place, silver medalist(s)	Emmanouil Karalis	Greece	6.00 m	
3rd place, bronze medalist(s)	Sam Kendricks	United States	5.80 m	
4	Kurtis Marschall	Australia	5.65 m	
4	Menno Vloon	Netherlands	5.65 m	
—	Renaud Lavillenie	France	NM	

=== Women's ===
100 metres
Place	Athlete	Nation	Time	Notes
1st place, gold medalist(s)	Julien Alfred	Saint Lucia	10.76	
2nd place, silver medalist(s)	Tia Clayton	Jamaica	10.84	
3rd place, bronze medalist(s)	Marie Josée Ta Lou-Smith	Ivory Coast	10.92	
4	Dina Asher-Smith	Great Britain	10.94	
5	Jacious Sears	United States	10.96	
6	Zoe Hobbs	New Zealand	11.09	
7	Maia McCoy	United States	11.14	
8	Salomé Kora	Switzerland	11.21	
9	Patrizia van der Weken	Luxembourg	11.26	
			Wind: (+0.3 m/s)	

3000 metres
Place	Athlete	Nation	Time	Notes
1st place, gold medalist(s)	Fantaye Belayneh	Ethiopia	8:40.56	
2nd place, silver medalist(s)	Josette Andrews	United States	8:40.95	
3rd place, bronze medalist(s)	Likina Amebaw	Ethiopia	8:41.06	
4	Georgia Griffith	Australia	8:41.36	
5	Aleshign Baweke	Ethiopia	8:42.35	
6	Marta García	Spain	8:42.63	
7	Caroline Nyaga	Kenya	8:43.43	
8	Hannah Nuttall	Great Britain	8:44.74	
9	Rose Davies	Australia	8:46.11	
10	Hirut Meshesha	Ethiopia	8:52.48	
—	Salomé Afonso	Portugal	DNF	PM

100 metres hurdles
Place	Athlete	Nation	Time	Notes
1st place, gold medalist(s)	Ackera Nugent	Jamaica	12.30	=SB
2nd place, silver medalist(s)	Ditaji Kambundji	Switzerland	12.40	=NR
3rd place, bronze medalist(s)	Grace Stark	United States	12.40 [.434]	
4	Danielle Williams	Jamaica	12.40 [.440]	
5	Nadine Visser	Netherlands	12.45	
6	Tonea Marshall	United States	12.49	
7	Devynne Charlton	Bahamas	12.52	SB
8	Kendra Harrison	United States	12.72	
9	Selina von Jackowski	Switzerland	13.24	
			Wind: (−0.6 m/s)	

Long jump
Place	Athlete	Nation	Distance	Notes
1st place, gold medalist(s)	Larissa Iapichino	Italy	6.93 m (−1.1 m/s)	
2nd place, silver medalist(s)	Malaika Mihambo	Germany	6.92 m (+0.1 m/s)	
3rd place, bronze medalist(s)	Hilary Kpatcha	France	6.75 m (−0.8 m/s)	
4	Claire Bryant	United States	6.66 m (−0.3 m/s)	
5	Annik Kälin	Switzerland	6.55 m (−0.8 m/s)	
6	Monae' Nichols	United States	6.45 m (±0.0 m/s)	

== Diamond events results ==
=== Men's ===
200 metres
Place	Athlete	Nation	Time	Notes
1st place, gold medalist(s)	Noah Lyles	United States	19.74	
2nd place, silver medalist(s)	Letsile Tebogo	Botswana	19.76	=SB
3rd place, bronze medalist(s)	Alexander Ogando	Dominican Republic	20.14	
4	Robert Gregory	United States	20.20	
5	Reynier Mena	Cuba	20.26	
6	Kyree King	United States	20.43	
7	Udodi Onwuzurike	Nigeria	20.46	
8	Joseph Fahnbulleh	Liberia	20.54	
			Wind: (−0.6 m/s)	

400 metres
Place	Athlete	Nation	Time	Notes
1st place, gold medalist(s)	Jacory Patterson	United States	43.85	PB
2nd place, silver medalist(s)	Bayapo Ndori	Botswana	44.40	
3rd place, bronze medalist(s)	Vernon Norwood	United States	44.45	
4	Muzala Samukonga	Zambia	44.49	
5	Christopher Bailey	United States	44.75	
6	Daniel Segers	Belgium	45.01	
7	Collen Kebinatshipi	Botswana	45.40	
8	Alexander Doom	Belgium	45.61	

800 metres
Place	Athlete	Nation	Time	Notes
1st place, gold medalist(s)	Emmanuel Wanyonyi	Kenya	1:42.37	
2nd place, silver medalist(s)	Max Burgin	Great Britain	1:42.42	
3rd place, bronze medalist(s)	Marco Arop	Canada	1:42.57	
4	Djamel Sedjati	Algeria	1:42.84	
5	Tshepiso Masalela	Botswana	1:43.16	
6	Mohamed Attaoui	Spain	1:43.35	
7	Bryce Hoppel	United States	1:43.78	
8	Josh Hoey	United States	1:44.25	
—	Patryk Sieradzki	Poland	DNF	PM

3000 metres
Place	Athlete	Nation	Time	Notes
1st place, gold medalist(s)	Jimmy Gressier	France	7:36.78	
2nd place, silver medalist(s)	Grant Fisher	United States	7:36.81	
3rd place, bronze medalist(s)	Andreas Almgren	Sweden	7:36.82	
4	Mohamed Abdilaahi	Germany	7:37.31	PB
5	Biniam Mehary	Ethiopia	7:37.33	
6	Graham Blanks	United States	7:38.15	
7	George Mills	Great Britain	7:38.71	
8	Samuel Tefera	Ethiopia	7:38.93	
9	Jonas Raess	Switzerland	7:46.82	
10	Mike Foppen	Netherlands	7:47.04	
11	Kuma Girma	Ethiopia	7:51.33	
12	Wegene Adisu	Ethiopia	7:54.16	PB, PM
—	Mounir Akbache	France	DNF	PM

110 metres hurdles
Place	Athlete	Nation	Time	Notes
1st place, gold medalist(s)	Cordell Tinch	United States	12.92	=MR
2nd place, silver medalist(s)	Enrique Llopis	Spain	13.12	SB
3rd place, bronze medalist(s)	Jamal Britt	United States	13.21	
4	Jason Joseph	Switzerland	13.22	
5	Freddie Crittenden	United States	13.23	
6	Trey Cunningham	United States	13.32	
7	Orlando Bennett	Jamaica	13.35	
8	Rachid Muratake	Japan	14.39	
			Wind: (+0.3 m/s)	

3000 metres steeplechase
Place	Athlete	Nation	Time	Notes
1st place, gold medalist(s)	Frederik Ruppert	Germany	8:09.02	
2nd place, silver medalist(s)	Edmund Serem	Kenya	8:09.96	
3rd place, bronze medalist(s)	Salaheddine Ben Yazide	Morocco	8:14.10	
4	Daniel Arce	Spain	8:14.36	
5	Nicolas-Marie Daru	France	8:18.68	
6	Isaac Updike	United States	8:19.47	
7	Mohamed Amin Jhinaoui	Tunisia	8:24.75	
8	Abrham Sime	Ethiopia	8:28.13	
9	Tim Van de Velde	Belgium	8:31.52	
—	Wilberforce Kones	Kenya	DNF	PM
—	Wesley Langat	Kenya	DNF	PM

High jump
Place	Athlete	Nation	Height	Notes
1st place, gold medalist(s)	Hamish Kerr	New Zealand	2.32 m	
2nd place, silver medalist(s)	Oleh Doroshchuk	Ukraine	2.30 m	
3rd place, bronze medalist(s)	JuVaughn Harrison	United States	2.25 m	
4	Romaine Beckford	Jamaica	2.22 m	
5	Marco Fassinotti	Italy	2.19 m	
6	Shelby McEwen	United States	2.13 m	

Long jump
Place	Athlete	Nation	Distance	Notes
1st place, gold medalist(s)	Simon Ehammer	Switzerland	8.32 m (−0.6 m/s)	
2nd place, silver medalist(s)	Mattia Furlani	Italy	8.30 m (+0.7 m/s)	
3rd place, bronze medalist(s)	Liam Adcock	Australia	8.24 m (−0.3 m/s)	
4	Wayne Pinnock	Jamaica	8.15 m (+N/W m/s)	
5	Carey McLeod	Jamaica	8.07 m (+0.5 m/s)	
6	Miltiadis Tentoglou	Greece	7.66 m (−0.2 m/s)	

Triple jump
Place	Athlete	Nation	Distance	Notes
1st place, gold medalist(s)	Andy Díaz	Italy	17.56 m (−0.3 m/s)	
2nd place, silver medalist(s)	Pedro Pichardo	Portugal	17.47 m (+0.4 m/s)	SB
3rd place, bronze medalist(s)	Yasser Triki	Algeria	17.42 m (−0.3 m/s)	SB
4	Jordan Scott	Jamaica	17.16 m (+0.6 m/s)	
5	Almir dos Santos	Brazil	16.50 m (+0.5 m/s)	
6	Endiorass Kingley	Austria	16.36 m (−0.1 m/s)	

Shot put
Place	Athlete	Nation	Distance	Notes
1st place, gold medalist(s)	Joe Kovacs	United States	22.46 m	
2nd place, silver medalist(s)	Payton Otterdahl	United States	22.07 m	
3rd place, bronze medalist(s)	Rajindra Campbell	Jamaica	21.87 m	
4	Adrian Piperi	United States	21.84 m	
5	Tom Walsh	New Zealand	21.55 m	
6	Leonardo Fabbri	Italy	21.47 m	
7	Stefan Wieland	Switzerland	18.61 m	

Discus throw
Place	Athlete	Nation	Distance	Notes
1st place, gold medalist(s)	Mykolas Alekna	Lithuania	68.89 m	
2nd place, silver medalist(s)	Kristjan Čeh	Slovenia	67.18 m	
3rd place, bronze medalist(s)	Rojé Stona	Jamaica	67.06 m	
4	Matthew Denny	Australia	66.62 m	
5	Daniel Ståhl	Sweden	66.47 m	
6	Henrik Janssen	Germany	66.37 m	

Javelin throw
Place	Athlete	Nation	Distance	Notes
1st place, gold medalist(s)	Julian Weber	Germany	91.51 m	PB, WL
2nd place, silver medalist(s)	Neeraj Chopra	India	85.01 m	
3rd place, bronze medalist(s)	Keshorn Walcott	Trinidad and Tobago	84.95 m	
4	Anderson Peters	Grenada	82.06 m	
5	Julius Yego	Kenya	82.01 m	
6	Andrian Mardare	Moldova	81.81 m	
7	Simon Wieland	Switzerland	81.29 m	PB

=== Women's ===
200 metres
Place	Athlete	Nation	Time	Notes
1st place, gold medalist(s)	Brittany Brown	United States	22.13	SB
2nd place, silver medalist(s)	Dina Asher-Smith	Great Britain	22.18	
3rd place, bronze medalist(s)	Marie Josée Ta Lou-Smith	Ivory Coast	22.25	SB
4	Anavia Battle	United States	22.49	
5	Amy Hunt	Great Britain	22.61	
6	Jenna Prandini	United States	22.70	
7	Jessika Gbai	Ivory Coast	22.71	SB
8	McKenzie Long	United States	22.72	
			Wind: (−0.4 m/s)	

400 metres
Place	Athlete	Nation	Time	Notes
1st place, gold medalist(s)	Salwa Eid Naser	Bahrain	48.70	MR
2nd place, silver medalist(s)	Marileidy Paulino	Dominican Republic	49.23	
3rd place, bronze medalist(s)	Henriette Jæger	Norway	49.49	NR
4	Martina Weil	Chile	49.72	NR
5	Amber Anning	Great Britain	49.75	SB
6	Isabella Whittaker	United States	49.99	
7	Lieke Klaver	Netherlands	50.23	
8	Natalia Bukowiecka	Poland	51.06	

800 metres
Place	Athlete	Nation	Time	Notes
1st place, gold medalist(s)	Audrey Werro	Switzerland	1:55.91	NR
2nd place, silver medalist(s)	Georgia Hunter Bell	Great Britain	1:55.96	PB
3rd place, bronze medalist(s)	Anaïs Bourgoin	France	1:56.97	PB
4	Shafiqua Maloney	Saint Vincent and the Grenadines	1:57.29	NR
5	Halimah Nakaayi	Uganda	1:58.43	
6	Prudence Sekgodiso	South Africa	1:58.57	
7	Sarah Billings	Australia	1:58.76	
8	Addison Wiley	United States	1:59.14	
—	Lisanne de Witte	Netherlands	DNF	PM

1500 metres
Place	Athlete	Nation	Time	Notes
1st place, gold medalist(s)	Nelly Chepchirchir	Kenya	3:56.99	SB
2nd place, silver medalist(s)	Jessica Hull	Australia	3:57.02	
3rd place, bronze medalist(s)	Linden Hall	Australia	3:57.44	
4	Sinclaire Johnson	United States	3:57.80	
5	Heather MacLean	United States	3:59.43	
6	Susan Ejore	Kenya	3:59.48	
7	Birke Haylom	Ethiopia	3:59.70	
8	Sarah Healy	Ireland	3:59.90	
9	Agathe Guillemot	France	4:00.40	
10	Marta Zenoni	Italy	4:00.71	
11	Joceline Wind	Switzerland	4:08.37	
—	Catriona Bisset	Australia	DNF	PM

400 metres hurdles
Place	Athlete	Nation	Time	Notes
1st place, gold medalist(s)	Femke Bol	Netherlands	52.18	MR
2nd place, silver medalist(s)	Emma Zapletalová	Slovakia	53.18	NR
3rd place, bronze medalist(s)	Andrenette Knight	Jamaica	53.76	
4	Gianna Woodruff	Panama	54.24	
5	Naomi Van den Broeck	Belgium	54.83	
6	Amalie Iuel	Norway	55.34	
7	Ayomide Folorunso	Italy	55.77	
8	Zenéy van der Walt	South Africa	56.90	

3000 metres steeplechase
Place	Athlete	Nation	Time	Notes
1st place, gold medalist(s)	Faith Cherotich	Kenya	8:57.24	
2nd place, silver medalist(s)	Norah Jeruto	Kazakhstan	9:10.87	
3rd place, bronze medalist(s)	Marwa Bouzayani	Tunisia	9:12.03	
4	Courtney Wayment	United States	9:14.91	
5	Gabrielle Jennings	United States	9:15.56	
6	Daisy Jepkemei	Kazakhstan	9:15.98	SB
7	Olivia Markezich	United States	9:22.20	
8	Lea Meyer	Germany	9:26.08	
9	Rihab Dhahri	Tunisia	9:51.96	
—	Kinga Królik	Poland	DNF	
—	Gesa Felicitas Krause	Germany	DNF	PM

High jump
Place	Athlete	Nation	Height	Notes
1st place, gold medalist(s)	Nicola Olyslagers	Australia	2.04 m	AR, WL
2nd place, silver medalist(s)	Yaroslava Mahuchikh	Ukraine	2.02 m	=SB
3rd place, bronze medalist(s)	Morgan Lake	Great Britain	2.00 m	NR
4	Yuliya Levchenko	Ukraine	2.00 m	SB
5	Christina Honsel	Germany	1.97 m	
6	Eleanor Patterson	Australia	1.91 m	

Pole vault
Place	Athlete	Nation	Height	Notes
1st place, gold medalist(s)	Katie Moon	United States	4.82 m	
2nd place, silver medalist(s)	Sandi Morris	United States	4.75 m	
3rd place, bronze medalist(s)	Emily Grove	United States	4.75 m	=PB
4	Angelica Moser	Switzerland	4.65 m	
5	Tina Šutej	Slovenia	4.65 m	
6	Roberta Bruni	Italy	4.45 m	
7	Lea Bachmann	Switzerland	4.30 m	

Triple jump
Place	Athlete	Nation	Distance	Notes
1st place, gold medalist(s)	Leyanis Pérez	Cuba	14.91 m (−0.5 m/s)	
2nd place, silver medalist(s)	Liadagmis Povea	Cuba	14.72 m (−0.6 m/s)	
3rd place, bronze medalist(s)	Davisleydi Velazco	Cuba	14.65 m (−0.6 m/s)	
4	Thea LaFond	Dominica	14.62 m (+0.3 m/s)	SB
5	Shanieka Ricketts	Jamaica	14.35 m (−0.6 m/s)	
6	Jasmine Moore	United States	14.24 m (−0.2 m/s)	

Shot put
Place	Athlete	Nation	Distance	Notes
1st place, gold medalist(s)	Jessica Schilder	Netherlands	20.26 m	
2nd place, silver medalist(s)	Chase Jackson	United States	20.08 m	
3rd place, bronze medalist(s)	Sarah Mitton (Note: Mitton was originally awarded the Diamond League title, however a protest was launched over her winning throw and after a review it was deemed a foul. Mitton was demoted to third place with Schilder becoming the champion.)	Canada	19.99 m	
4	Jaida Ross	United States	19.26 m	
5	Fanny Roos	Sweden	19.11 m	
6	Maggie Ewen	United States	18.45 m	
7	Miryam Mazenauer	Switzerland	16.91 m	

Discus throw
Place	Athlete	Nation	Distance	Notes
1st place, gold medalist(s)	Valarie Allman	United States	69.18 m	
2nd place, silver medalist(s)	Jorinde van Klinken	Netherlands	67.15 m	SB
3rd place, bronze medalist(s)	Yaime Pérez	Cuba	66.08 m	
4	Sandra Elkasević	Croatia	65.10 m	
5	Cierra Jackson	United States	64.40 m	
6	Laulauga Tausaga	United States	63.51 m	

Javelin throw
Place	Athlete	Nation	Distance	Notes
1st place, gold medalist(s)	Elina Tzengko	Greece	64.57 m	
2nd place, silver medalist(s)	Adriana Vilagoš	Serbia	62.96 m	
3rd place, bronze medalist(s)	Jo-Ané du Plessis	South Africa	62.26 m	
4	Mackenzie Little	Australia	61.96 m	SB
5	Flor Ruiz	Colombia	60.86 m	
6	Haruka Kitaguchi	Japan	60.72 m	

== See also ==
- 2025 Diamond League
