= Andorra at the 2018 European Athletics Championships =

- WA code: AND
- National federation: FAA
- Website: www.faa.ad

in Berlin
- Competitors: 1

European Athletics Championships appearances
- 1998; 2002; 2006; 2010; 2012; 2014; 2016; 2018; 2022; 2024

Andorra competed at the 2018 European Athletics Championships in Berlin, Germany, from 6-12 August 2018. A delegation of 1 athlete was sent to represent the country.

The following athlete was selected to compete by the Andorran Athletics Federation.

Men
Track and road

Athletes	Event	Heats		Semifinal		Final	
Athletes	Event	Result	Rank	Result	Rank	Result	Rank
Carles Gómez	1500 metres	4:00.02	34	did not advance			
