= Andorra at the 2016 European Athletics Championships =

- WA code: AND
- National federation: FAA
- Website: www.faa.ad

in Amsterdam
- Competitors: 3 (2 men and 1 woman) in 3 events
- Medals: Gold 0 Silver 0 Bronze 0 Total 0

European Athletics Championships appearances
- 1998; 2002; 2006; 2010; 2012; 2014; 2016; 2018; 2022; 2024

Andorra competed at the 2016 European Athletics Championships in Amsterdam, Netherlands, between 6 and 10 July 2016.

== Results ==
Men
Track & road events

Athlete	Event	Heat		Semifinal		Final	
Athlete	Event	Result	Rank	Result	Rank	Result	Rank
Mikel de Sa	200 m	22.74	24	did not advance			
Pol Moya	800 m	1:50.03	19	did not advance			

Women
Field Events

Athlete	Event	Qualification		Final	
Athlete	Event	Distance	Rank	Distance	Rank
Claudia Guri	High jump	1.75	26	did not advance	
