= 2015 European Athletics U23 Championships – Men's 3000 metres steeplechase =

The men's 3000 metres steeplechase event at the 2015 European Athletics U23 Championships was held in Tallinn, Estonia, at Kadriorg Stadium on 12 July.

== Medalists ==
Gold	Mitko Tsenov; Bulgaria
Silver	Viktor Bakharev; Russia
Bronze	Osama Zoghlami; Italy

== Results ==
=== Final ===
12 July

Rank	Name	Nationality	Time	Notes
1st place, gold medalist(s)	Mitko Tsenov	Bulgaria	8:37.79	
2nd place, silver medalist(s)	Viktor Bakharev	Russia	8:40.75	
3rd place, bronze medalist(s)	Osama Zoghlami	Italy	8:42.00	
4	Ala Zoghlami	Italy	8:42.85	
5	Italo Quazzola	Italy	8:46.27	PB
6	Alberts Blajs	Latvia	8:47.97	PB
7	Miguel Borges	Portugal	8:49.08	PB
8	Djilali Bedrani	France	8:50.99	
9	Philipp Reinhardt	Germany	8:51.30	
10	Osman Junuzovič	Bosnia and Herzegovina	8:52.11	PB
11	Konstantin Wedel	Germany	8:53.87	
12	Fernando Serrão	Portugal	8:57.18	
13	André Pereira	Portugal	9:14.00	
14	Nikolas Fraggou	Cyprus	9:22.73	

== Participation ==
According to an unofficial count, 14 athletes from 9 countries participated in the event.

- Bosnia and Herzegovina (1)
- Bulgaria (1)
- Cyprus (1)
- France (1)
- Germany (2)
- Italy (3)
- Latvia (1)
- Portugal (3)
- Russia (1)
