= Ruben Querinjean =

Luxembourgish middle-distance runner

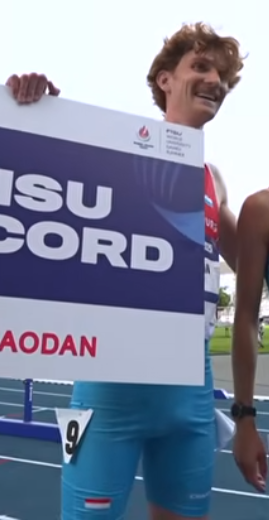
- At the 2025 Summer World University Games

Personal information
- Born: 22 December 2001 (age 24)

Sport
- Sport: Athletics
- Event: Steeplechase

Achievements and titles
- Personal bests: 1500 m: 3:34.92 (Liege, 2025); 3000 m s'chase: 8:09.47 (Brussels, 2025) NR; Indoors: 3000 m: 7:40.72 (Luxembourg, 2026) NR; Road: 10 km: 28:25 (Lille, 2025) NR
Medal record
Men's athletics
Representing Luxembourg
European Championships
Silver medal – second place	2026 Birmingham	3000 m steeplechase
Summer World University Games
Gold medal – first place	2025 Bochum	3000 m s'chase
World Road Running Championships
Bronze medal – third place	2026 Copenhagen	Mile

Ruben Querinjean (born 22 December 2001) is a Luxembourgish middle-distance runner who specialises in 3000 metres steeplechase in which he is the national record holder and 2025 University Games champion. That year, he became the first Luxembourg athlete to win a Diamond League event.

== Biography ==
In 2024, he set a new Luxembourg national record for the 3000 metres steeplechase at an international meeting in Liège, Belgium. In July of that year at the Luxembourg Athletics Championships he lowered the Luxembourg record again with a time of 8:18.82. He subsequently competed for Luxembourg at the 2024 Summer Olympics in Paris, France in the 3000 metres steeplechase, where he placed ninth in his heat with a time of 8:27.97.

He placed third in Hulshout at the Belgian Cross Country Championships in November 2024. In March 2025, he set a new Luxembourg national record in the 10 km road race in Lille, France, running 28:25.

In June 2025, in Turku, Finland, he broke his own national record in the 3000 metres steeplechase with a time of 8:14.33, taking more than four seconds from his previous personal best and securing the minimum automatic standard for the upcoming World Championships. The following month, he won the gold medal in the 3000 metres steeplechase at the 2025 Summer World University Games in Bochum, Germany in a games record 8:18.47.

On 22 August 2025, he secured his first Diamond League victory on debut at the 2025 Memorial Van Damme in Brussels, Belgium and set a new national record for the 3000 metres steeplechase with a time of 8:09:47. It was the first victory by an athlete from Luxembourg at a Diamond League event. He finished tenth in the World Championship final on 15 September 2025 in Tokyo, Japan.

In November 2025, he won ahead of Isaac Kimeli at the Belgian Cross Country Championships. Competing at the CMCM Indoor Meeting in Luxembourg, a silver meeting on the 2026 World Athletics Indoor Tour, he improved his Luxembourgish indoor record over 3000 metres to 7:40.72. Later in January 2026, he placed sixth at the Lotto Cross Cup de Hannut. In August 2026, he won the silver medal finishing between Germans Frederik Ruppert and Karl Bebendorf in the men's 3000m steeplechase at the 2026 European Athletics Championships in Birmingham, England. It was the first European athletics medal for Luxembourg since David Fiegen in 2006. Competing in the mile run at the World Athletics Road Running Championships on 19 September 2026, Querinjean won the bronze medal in a national record of 3:52.77. It was the first global senior athletics medal won by a Luxembourg man since Josy Barthel at the 1952 Olympic Games.

== Personal life ==
Querinjean has a master's degree in physiotherapy and rehabilitation from the University of Liège in Belgium. He has dual citizenship with Belgium.

== Personal bests ==
Results
Event	Time	Venue	Date	Notes
800 m	1:49.12	Sportcentrum Osbroek, Aalst	14 August 2022	
1500 m	3.34.92	Province Naimette Arena, Liège (BEL)	16 July 2025	
3000 m	7:53.60	Hal 5, Leuven	6 August 2022	
3000 m Short Track	7:40.72	Centre National Sportif et Culturel Coque, Luxembourg	18 January 2026	NR
5000 m	15:31.29	Stade Josy Barthel, Luxembourg	18 September 2022	
2000 m Steeplechase	5:27.74	Schönbuchstadion, Pliezhausen	5 May 2024	
3000 m Steeplechase	8:09.47	Brussels, Belgium	22 August 2025	NR
10 Kilometres Road	28:25	Lille	16 March 2025	NR
