= 2019 European Athletics U23 Championships – Men's 3000 metres steeplechase =

The men's 3000 metres steeplechase event at the 2019 European Athletics U23 Championships was held in Gävle, Sweden, at Gavlehov Stadium Park on 12 and 14 July.

== Medalists ==
Gold	Silver	Bronze
Frederik Ruppert; Germany	Alexis Phelut; France	Simon Sundström; Sweden

== Results ==
=== Heats ===
Qualification: First 5 in each heat (Q) and next 5 fastest (q) qualified for the final.

Rank	Heat	Name	Nationality	Time	Notes
1	2	Ivo Balabanov	Bulgaria	8:53.09	Q, SB
2	1	Simon Sundström	Sweden	8:54.19	Q
3	1	El Hocine Bouchrak	Spain	8:54.94	Q
4	1	Alexis Phelut	France	8:56.22	Q
5	2	Louis Gilavert	France	8:56.24	Q
6	2	Robert Baumann	Germany	8:56.33	Q
7	2	Frederik Ruppert	Germany	8:56.38	Q
8	2	Clement Deflandre	Belgium	8:56.45	Q
9	2	Brian Fay	Ireland	8:56.63	q
10	1	Lennart Mesecke	Germany	8:56.76	Q
11	1	Anthony Pontier	France	8:57.21	Q
12	1	Leo Magnusson	Sweden	8:57.71	q, PB
13	2	Nahuel Carabaña	Andorra	8:58.95	q
14	2	David Foller	Czech Republic	8:59.44	q
15	2	Damián Vích	Czech Republic	9:00.92	q
16	1	Filip Svalina	Croatia	9:03.22	
17	1	Fredrik Sandvik	Norway	9:03.23	
18	2	Tomás Silva	Portugal	9:09.17	
19	1	Marek Chrascina	Czech Republic	9:10.51	
20	1	Muhammed Çelebi	Turkey	9:10.54	SB
21	1	Viachaslau Skudny	Belarus	9:10.79	
22	1	Tobias Rattinger	Austria	9:15.00	
23	1	Artūrs Niklāvs Medveds	Latvia	9:15.67	
24	2	Lars Lunde	Norway	9:15.68	
25	2	András Lendvai	Hungary	9:17.18	
25	2	Axel Djurberg	Sweden	9:17.71	
26	2	Yunus Emre Akkuş	Turkey	9:18.04	
26	1	Paul O'Donnell	Ireland	9:20.86	
27	2	Oğuzhan Ülger	Turkey	9:26.91	
28	1	Simão Bastos	Portugal	9:29.16	
	1	Jorge Moreira	Portugal	DNF	

=== Final ===
Rank	Name	Nationality	Time	Notes
1st place, gold medalist(s)	Frederik Ruppert	Germany	8:44.49	
2nd place, silver medalist(s)	Alexis Phelut	France	8:45.04	
3rd place, bronze medalist(s)	Simon Sundström	Sweden	8:45.82	
4	Ivo Balabanov	Bulgaria	8:47.20	PB
5	Lennart Mesecke	Germany	8:47.61	
6	Louis Gilavert	France	8:48.28	
7	Leo Magnusson	Sweden	8:50.55	PB
8	El Hocine Bouchrak	Spain	8:51.21	
9	Clement Deflandre	Belgium	8:52.46	
10	Robert Baumann	Germany	8:53.55	
11	Brian Fay	Ireland	8:56.22	
12	Anthony Pontier	France	8:57.21	
13	David Foller	Czech Republic	8:59.30	
14	Damián Vích	Czech Republic	9:01.90	
15	Nahuel Carabaña	Andorra	9:21.17	
