= Will Battershill =

British athlete

Personal information
- Nationality: British (English)
- Born: 19 January 1996 (age 30)

Sport
- Sport: Track and Field
- Event: 3000m steeplechase
- Club: Erme Valley Harriers; Bristol & West

Achievements and titles
- Personal bests: 3000m S'chase: 8:21.83 (Manchester, 2024)
Medal record
Representing England
British Championships
| Gold medal – first place | 2023 Manchester | 3000 steeplechase |
| Silver medal – second place | 2024 Manchester | 3000 steeplechase |

Will Battershill (born 25 February 1998) is a British steeplechaser and long-distance runner. In 2023, he became the British champion in the 3000 metres steeplechase.

== Biography ==
Battershill attended Ivybridge Community College in Devon and competed as a Erme Valley Harriers athlete. He was the English Schools champion in 2014 with a 4:15.38 1500m steeplechase best that season. In 2015, as a 17 year-old he reached the 2015 IAAF World Youth Championships 2000 metres steeplechase final in Cali, Colombia on his Great Britain debut. Battershill won the under-17 South West Cross Country title and regained the English Schools title in 2016, after which he studied in the United States at Harvard University.

In his final year at Harvard he helped the team finish in 15th place in the NCAA DI Cross Country Championships, the program's best finish for more than 50 years. Although his final year was disrupted by the COVID-19 pandemic, the previous year he qualified for the NCAA Outdoor Championships in the 3000 metres steeplechase. In 2021, Battershill placed fifth overall in the 3000 m steeplechase at the British Championships and won the 2021 England Championships in July. The following month, he made his England senior debut in the event, running a new personal best of 8:32.91.

Battershill came to significant prominence after becoming the British champion in the 3,000 metres steeplechase event at the 2023 British Athletics Championships, held in Manchester. He was runner-up in the 3000m steeplechase at the 2024 British Athletics Championships in Manchester, running a personal best 8:21.83.

Battershill was selected for the 3000 metres steeplechase at the 2025 European Athletics Team Championships in Madrid in June 2025, placing sixth overall in the 3000m steeplechase. In 2025 and 2026 he won the British national road relay championships with Bristol & West.

Battershill competed over 3000 metres at the 2026 British Indoor Athletics Championships in Birmingham, placing ninth overall. On 21 June, he placed runner-up to Kristian Imroth in the 3000 metres steeplechase at the 2026 UK Athletics Championships, running 8:22.97. In August 2026, he qualified for the final of the men's 3000m steeplechase at the 2026 European Athletics Championships in Birmingham, finishing in 14th place.
