= 2021 European Athletics U23 Championships – Men's 3000 metres steeplechase =

Men's 3000 metres steeplechase at the 2021 European Athletics U23 Championships
- Venue: Kadriorg Stadium, Tallinn
- Dates: 9, 11 July
- Competitors: 37 from 22 nations
- Winning time: 8:34.05

Medalists
gold medal	István Palkovits	Hungary
silver medal	Etson Barros	Portugal
bronze medal	Nahuel Carabaña	Andorra

The men's 3000 metres steeplechase event at the 2021 European Athletics U23 Championships was held in Tallinn, Estonia, at Kadriorg Stadium on 9 and 11 July.

== Records ==
Prior to the competition, the records were as follows:

European U23 record	Günther Weidlinger (AUT)	8:10.83	Sevilla, Spain	21 August 1999
Championship U23 record	Martin Pröll (AUT)	8:25.86	Bydgoszcz, Poland	19 July 2003

== Results ==
=== Round 1 ===
Qualification rule: First 4 in each heat (Q) and the next 3 fastest (q) advance to the Final.

Rank	Heat	Name	Nationality	Time	Notes
1	3	Simão Bastos	Portugal	8:43.71	Q, PB
2	3	Leon Berthold	Switzerland	8:44.19	Q, PB
3	3	Alejandro Quijada	Spain	8:44.53	Q
4	3	Baptiste Guyon	France	8:45.00	Q
5	3	Giovanni Gatto	Italy	8:45.56	q
6	1	Eemil Helander	Finland	8:46.02	Q
7	1	Etson Barros	Portugal	8:46.91	Q
8	2	István Palkovits	Hungary	8:48.69	Q
9	3	Rayan Vanderpoorten	Belgium	8:48.80	q
10	1	Nahuel Carabaña	Andorra	8:49.10	Q
11	1	Estanislao Nicolas Ruiz Ullate	Spain	8:49.83	Q
12	2	Rémi Schyns	Belgium	8:49.94	Q
13	2	Nick Jäger	Germany	8:50.10	Q
14	2	Baptiste Coudert	France	8:51.07	Q
15	1	David Foller	Czech Republic	8:51.63	q, PB
16	2	Wilho Hautala	Finland	8:51.94	
17	3	Levente Szemerei	Hungary	8:52.03	
18	2	Axel Djurberg	Sweden	8:52.43	PB
19	2	Martin Kováčech	Czech Republic	8:53.54	PB
20	3	Mikołaj Czeronek	Poland	8:53.65	
21	1	Velten Schneider	Germany	8:54.17	
22	3	Miloš Malešević	Serbia	8:56.23	PB
23	3	Zemenu Muchie	Israel	9:01.34	
24	2	Loris Pellaz	Switzerland	9:08.42	
25	1	Omar Nuur	Sweden	9:08.46	
26	2	Vasyl Sabunyak	Ukraine	9:09.26	
27	1	Finley Daly	Ireland	9:09.58	
28	1	Aliaksandr Shustik	Belarus	9:10.23	
29	3	Vladyslav Martynyuk	Ukraine	9:17.87	
30	2	Abdullah Tuğluk	Turkey	9:18.33	
31	1	Lovro Nedeljković	Croatia	9:23.25	
32	1	Yunus Emre Akkuş	Turkey	9:30.04	
33	2	Leonid Vandevski	North Macedonia	9:48.69	
	2	Carlos Muñoz	Spain	DNF	
	2	Bruno Belčić	Croatia	DNF	
	1	Giedrius Valinčius	Lithuania	DNF	
	1	Olof Silvander	Sweden	DNF	

=== Final ===
Rank	Name	Nationality	Time	Notes
1st place, gold medalist(s)	István Palkovits	Hungary	8:34.05	
2nd place, silver medalist(s)	Etson Barros	Portugal	8:38.00	PB
3rd place, bronze medalist(s)	Nahuel Carabaña	Andorra	8:39.17	
4	Eemil Helander	Finland	8:39.75	PB
5	Alejandro Quijada	Spain	8:44.48	
6	Rayan Vanderpoorten	Belgium	8:44.93	PB
7	Baptiste Guyon	France	8:45.78	
8	Leon Berthold	Switzerland	8:46.62	
9	Simão Bastos	Portugal	8:48.38	
10	David Foller	Czech Republic	8:50.43	PB
11	Nick Jäger	Germany	8:50.77	
12	Giovanni Gatto	Italy	8:54.00	
13	Estanislao Nicolas Ruiz Ullate	Spain	8:58.11	
14	Rémi Schyns	Belgium	9:05.48	
15	Baptiste Coudert	France	9:10.19	
