= Mohamed Amin Jhinaoui =

Tunisian athlete

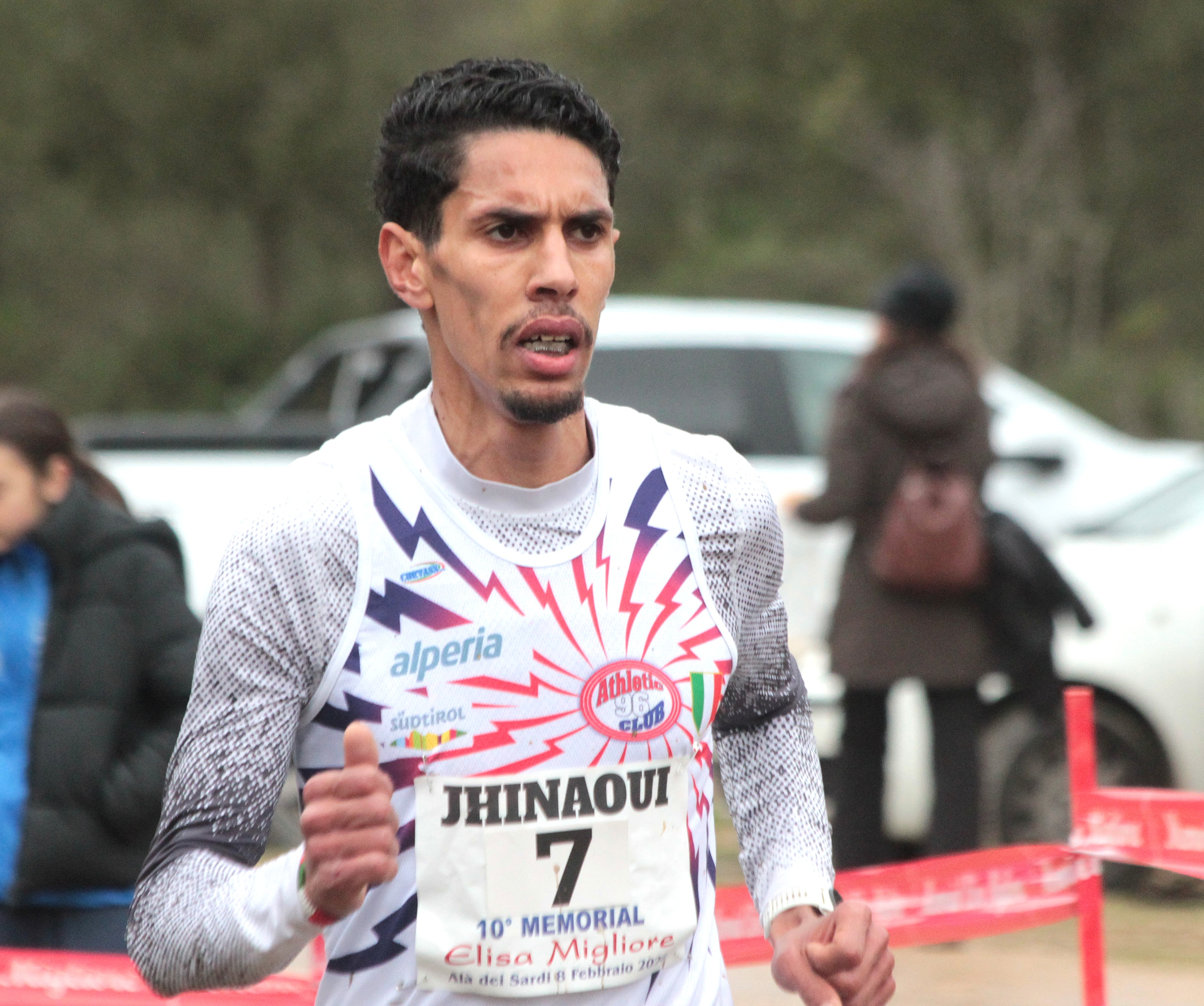
- Mohamed Amin Jhinaoui in 2026

Personal information
- Nationality: Tunisia
- Born: 2 April 1997 (age 29) Kairouan, Tunisia

Sport
- Sport: Athletics
- Event: 3000m steeplechase
- Club: Athletic Club 96
Medal record
Men's athletics
Representing Tunisia
Mediterranean Games
Silver medal – second place	2026 Taranto	5000 m

Mohamed Amin Jhinaoui (born 2 April 1997) is a Tunisian runner who specializes in the 3000 metres steeplechase.

== Career ==
A member of the Athletic Club 96, in Bolzano, Italy he ran a new personal best time for the 3000m steeplechase of 8:18.43 in Rovereto in May 2022. He lowered his personal best to 8:16.38 at the Diamond League event in Rome in June 2022. He was selected for the 2022 World Athletics Championships in Eugene, Oregon.

In July 2023, he ran a new personal best time of 8:12.19 at the Diamond League event in Paris. He competed in the 3000 metres steeplechase at the 2023 World Athletics Championships in Budapest in August 2023, where he finished thirteenth in the final.

He finished third in the 3000m steeplechase at the 2024 Diamond League event in Stockholm in June 2024. He competed at the 2024 Summer Olympics in Paris in the 3000 metres steeplechase, placing fourth in the final with a national record time of 8:07.73.

He finished sixth in the 3000m steeplechase at the 2025 Meeting International Mohammed VI d'Athlétisme de Rabat, part of the 2025 Diamond League, in May 2025. He placed seventh in the 3000 metres steeplechase at the Diamond League Final in Zurich on 28 August. In September 2025, he competed in the 3000 metres steeplechase at the 2025 World Championships in Tokyo, Japan.

== Personal bests ==
Outdoor

- 1500 metres – 3:37.07 (Milan 2023)
- 3000 metres – 7:37.56 (Doha 2023) NR
- 5000 metres – 13:24.10 (Rovereto 2022)
- 3000 metres steeplechase – 8:07.73 (Paris 2024) NR
