= Alexis Phelut =

French athlete

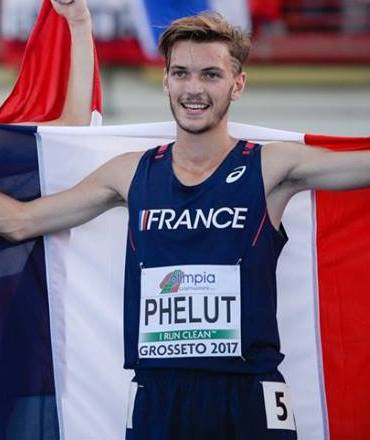
- Phelut at the 2017 European Athletics U20 Championships

Personal information
- Born: 31 March 1998 (age 28) Beaumont, Puy-de-Dôme, France
- Height: 181 cm (5 ft 11 in)
- Weight: 65 kg (143 lb)

Sport
- Country: France
- Sport: Athletics
- Event: 3000 m steeplechase

Achievements and titles
- Personal best: 8:18.67 (Oordegem 2021)
Medal record
Men's athletics
Representing France
Mediterranean U23 Championships
Gold medal – first place	2018 Jesolo	3000 m steeplechase
European U23 Championships
Silver medal – second place	2019 Gävle	3000 m steeplechase
European U20 Championships
Silver medal – second place	2017 Grosseto	3000 m steeplechase

Alexis Phelut (born 31 March 1998) is a French athlete who competes in the steeplechase.

From Beaumont, Puy-de-Dôme, his club is Clermont Athletisme Auvergne. He achieved 2nd place for the men's 3000m steeplechase at the Meeting Iberoamericano in Huelva on 3 June 2021 behind Yemane Haileselassie. A week previously he had met the Olympic standard for the delayed Tokyo Olympics at a meeting in Oordegem. At the 2020 Olympic Games he finished third in his heat to qualify for the 3000m steeplechase final.
