= Nicolas-Marie Daru =

French athlete (born 1988)

Personal information
- Born: 21 October 1988 (age 37) Lyon, France
- Height: 183 cm (6 ft 0 in)
- Weight: 73 kg (161 lb)

Sport
- Country: France
- Sport: Athletics
- Events: Cross-country running, 3000m Steeplechase

Achievements and titles
- Personal bests: 3000m s'chase: 8:10.69 (Shanghai, 2025)

Nicolas-Marie Daru (born 21 October 1988) is a French runner. In 2024, he became French national cross country champion, and also won the 3000m steeplechase at the French Athletics Championships.

== Early life ==
From Grenoble, Daru joined the French army in 2006.

== Career ==
He won the 2024 French Cross Country Championships. He ran for France at the 2024 World Athletics Cross Country Championships in the mixed relay in Belgrade in March 2024, and alongside Romain Mornet, Flavie Renouard and Charlotte Mouchet placed sixth overall.

He qualified for the final and finished sixth overall at the 2024 European Athletics Championships in Rome in the 3000m steeplechase. He then won the 2024 French Athletics Championships in June 2024 in that discipline. He competed at the 2024 Summer Olympics in Paris in the 3000 metres steeplechase.

He lowered his personal best to 8:11.78 for the 3000 metres steeplechase at the 2025 Xiamen Diamond League event in China, in April 2025. The following week, he lowered it to 8:10.69 at the 2025 Shanghai Diamond League event in China on 3 May 2025. In June 2025, he raced for France at the 2025 European Athletics Team Championships in Madrid, placing third in the 3000 metres steeplechase in the first division. He placed fifth in the 3000 metres steeplechase at the Diamond League Final in Zurich on 28 August. He was selected for the French team for the 2025 World Athletics Championships in Tokyo, Japan. He finished seventh in the World Championship final on 15 September 2025.

In May 2026, he had a top-ten finish in the 3000 metres steeplechase at the 2026 Meeting International Mohammed VI d'Athlétisme de Rabat, part of the 2026 Diamond League. Daru placed eighth in the 3000 m steeplechase on 28 June at the 2026 Meeting de Paris. In August, he competed at the 2026 European Athletics Championships in Birmingham, England, in the 3000 metres steeplechase, placing eighth.
