= Niklas Buchholz =

German steeplechaser

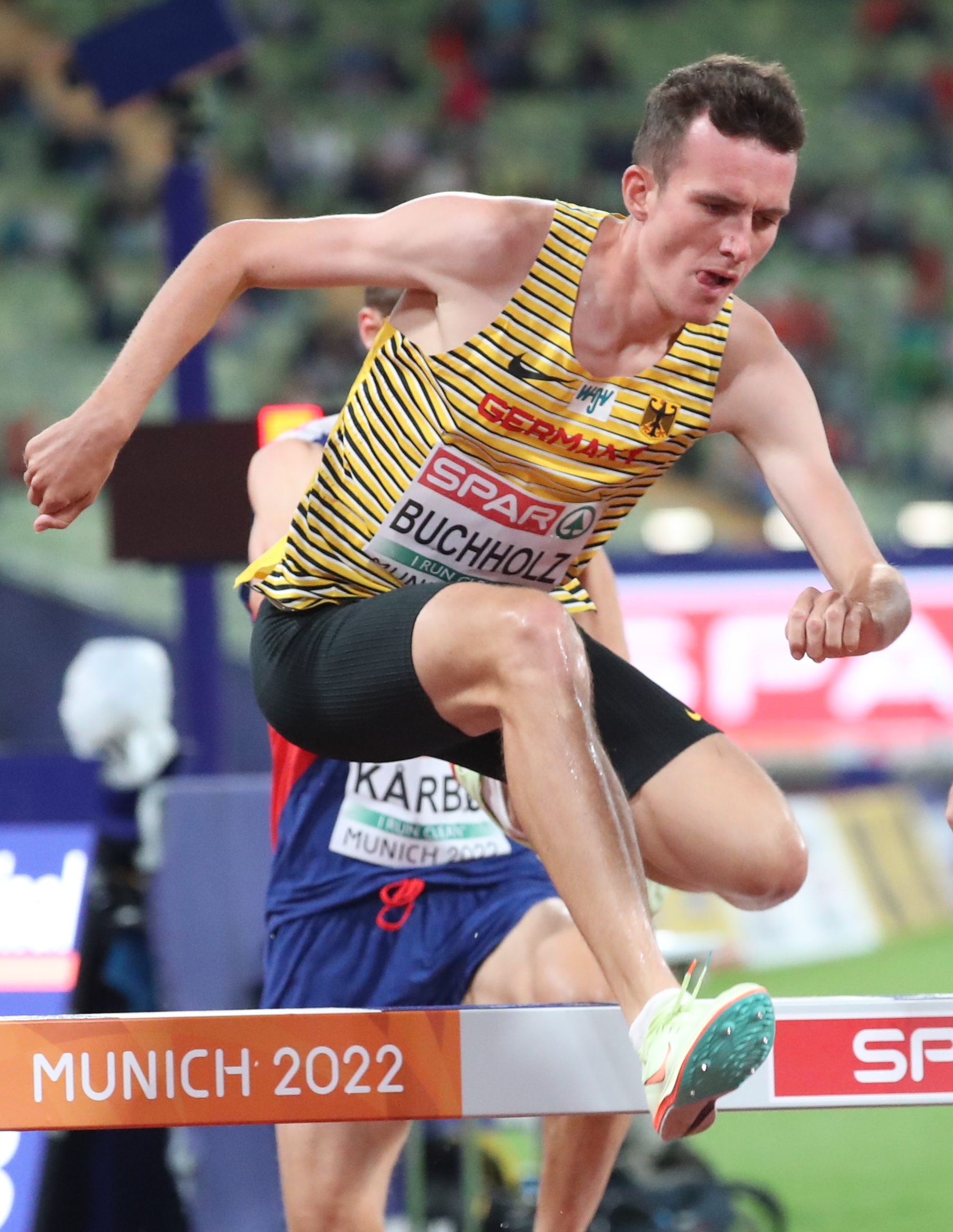
- Buchholz in 2022

Personal information
- Born: 4 March 1998 (age 28)

Sport
- Sport: Athletics
- Event: Steeplechase

Achievements and titles
- Personal best: 3000 m s'chase: 8:14.05 (2025)

Niklas Buchholz (born 4 March 1998) is a German steeplechaser.

== Biography ==
He is from Erlangen in Bavaria. He competed as a member of TSV Hemhofen, winning at the Bavarian Championships in 2017.

In 2022 in Karlsruhe, he ran 8:37.31 for the 3000 metres steeplechase which improved his personal best from 2019 by seven seconds. A week later, whilst competing in Belgium, he lowered his personal best again to 8:31.93. He subsequently qualified for the final of the 3000 metres steeplechase at the 2022 European Athletics Championships in Munich, placing fourteenth overall.

He placed third in the 3000 metres steeplechase at the German Athletics Championships in July 2023 in Kassel, running 8:27.06.

He placed third in the 3000 metres steeplechase at the German Athletics Championships in June 2024 in Braunschweig, running 8:32.36.

He placed third in the 3000 metres steeplechase at the German Athletics Championships in August 2025 in Dresden, running 8:39.98. That month, he lowered his personal best to 8:14.05 and also met the World Championship automatic qualifying standard in the 3000 m steeplechase whilst competing at the IFAM in Oordegem. In September 2025, he competed in the 3000 metres steeplechase at the 2025 World Championships in Tokyo, Japan, placing fifteenth overall.

On 19 June 2026, he placed sixth in the 3000 metres steeplechase at the 2026 Doha Diamond League. In August, he competed at the 2026 European Athletics Championships in Birmingham, England, in the 3000 metres steeplechase, placing ninth in the final.

== Personal life ==
Alongside fellow international athlete Florian Bremm, he is a member of a Erlangen-based running group who also post comedic athletics themed videos on YouTube under the name "Running Gags". He has also played volleyball for TSV Dinkelsbühl in the Bavarian Volleyball League.
