= Isaac Updike =

American steeplechaser (born 1992)

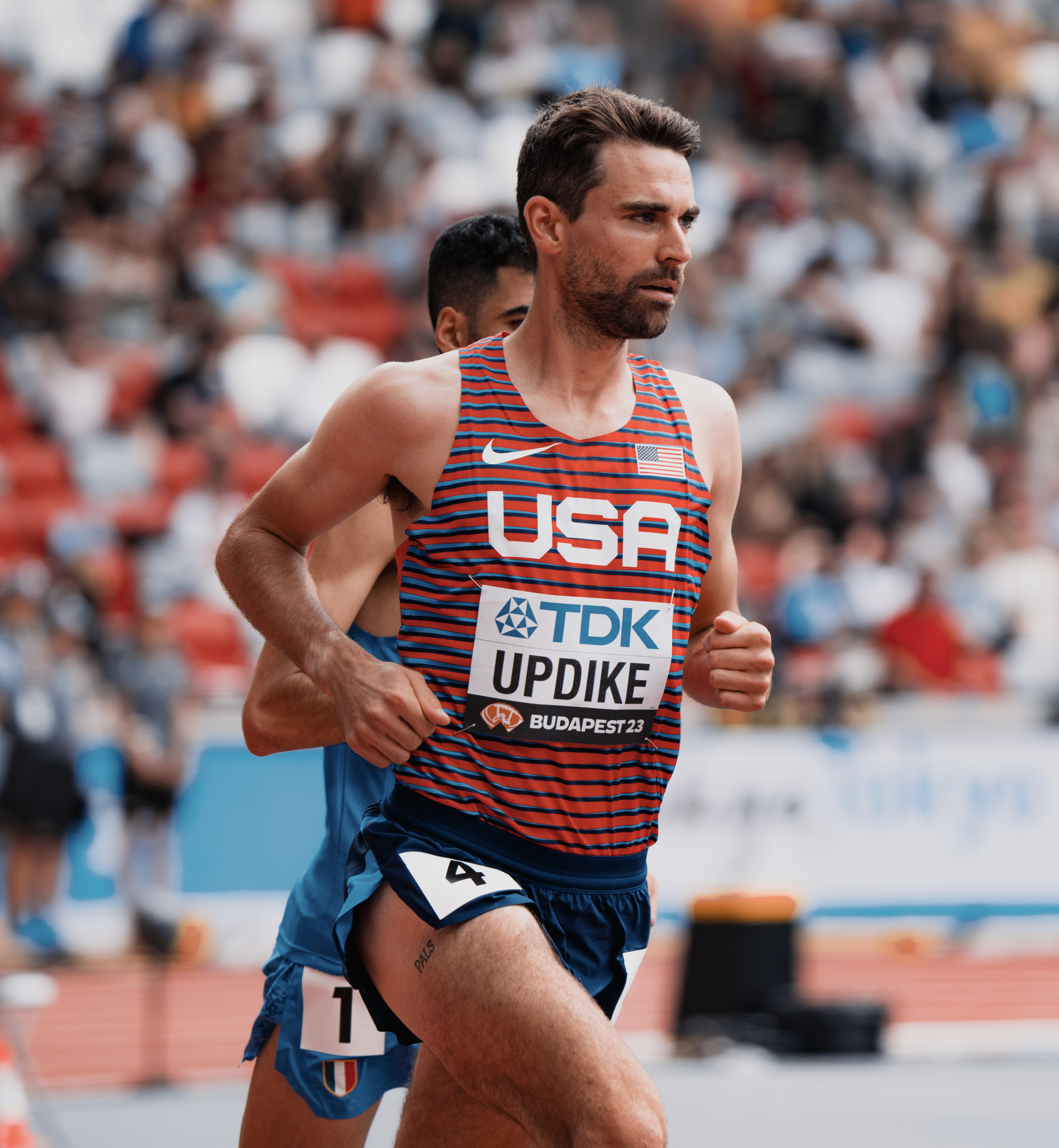
- Updike at the 2023 World Championships

Personal information
- Born: 21 March 1992 (age 34) Ketchikan, Alaska, United States
- Employer(s): Under Armour (2023-present); Nike (2021-2023); Hoka (2018-2021)
- Height: 6 ft 2 in (188 cm)

Sport
- Sport: Athletics
- Event: 3000 metres steeplechase
- Club: Under Armor Mission Run Dark Sky (2023-present); Empire Elite Track Club (2021-2023); Hoka New Jersey-New York Track Club (2018-2021); Team Runner Eugene (2015-2018)

Achievements and titles
- Personal best(s): 3000 m s'chase: 8:10.59 (Brussels, 2025)

Isaac Updike (born 21 March 1992) is an American track and field athlete who competes in the 3000 metres steeplechase. He represented the United States at the 2023 World Athletics Championships.

== Athletics career ==
Born in Ketchikan, Alaska, he has a twin brother called Lucas. Both competed for Ketchikan High School where they ran cross country and played soccer.

=== Eastern Oregon ===
Enrolling Eastern Oregon University in 2010, he joined the Eastern Oregon Mountaineers track and field and cross country teams as a walk on. Throughout his time at EOU, he set three new school records in the indoor 3000 m, 5000 m and 3000 m steeplechase, was a ten-time NAIA All-American and won the 2013 NAIA title in the steeplechase.

=== Professional ===
==== 2016 ====
After graduating from EOU, Updike moved to Eugene, Oregon, joining Team Runner Eugene and working part-time at Dick's Sporting Goods to support his running, setting the goal of qualifying for the 2016 United States Olympic Trials in the 3000 metres steeplechase. In May 2016, he ran a PB of 8:31.42, qualifying him for the trials. At the Olympic Trials, he made the final and would ultimately place 12th.

==== 2018 ====
At the 2018 USA Championships, Updike ran a personal best of 8:25.8 in the first round, the fastest time of the heats. In the final, he would place 14th. Later that year, he moved to New York, signing with Hoka and becoming a member of the Hoka New Jersey-New York Track Club based in Westchester County, New York.

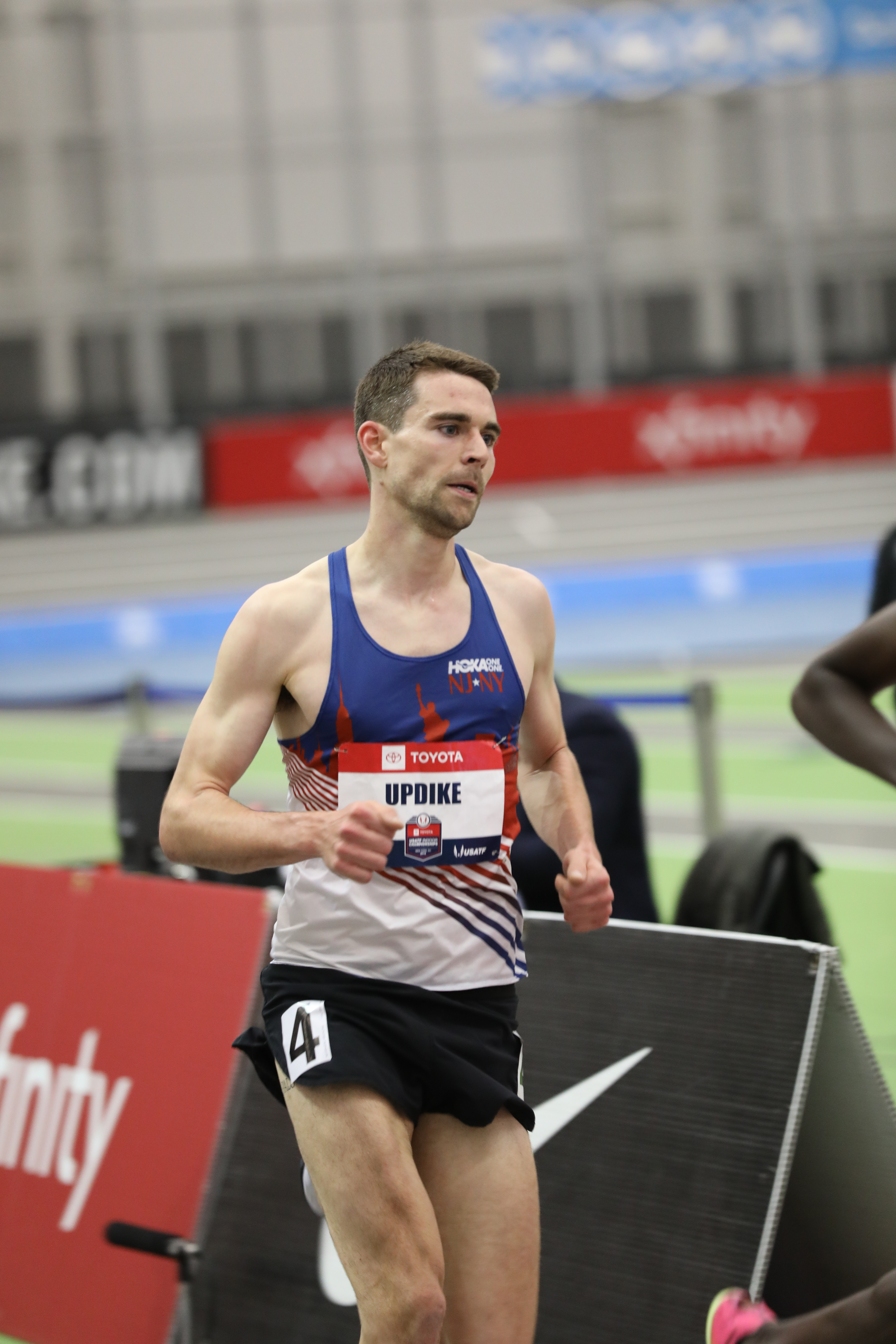
Updike at the 2019 USA Indoor Track and Field Championships

==== 2019 ====
In 2019, he ran the 2 mile at the USA Indoor Championships, placing eleventh in 8:39.03. At the USA Outdoor Championships, he placed eighth in the steeplechase, his highest placement yet at a US championship.

==== 2021 ====
Following the dissolution of the Hoka NJ-NY TC in 2021, Updike joined the newly-formed Empire Elite Track Club, which retained the same coaches as NJ-NY TC, Tom Nohilly and John Trautmann. Later that year, he signed with Nike. While living in New York, he worked as a teacher and coach at The Masters School, a private middle school and high school in Dobbs Ferry, a location that also served as a training base for the Empire Elite Team.

Ahead of the 2020 US Olympic Trials, Updike set a personal best and clocked world leading time of 8:17.74 at the USATF Grand Prix at Hayward Field. Back at Hayward two months later for the Trials, he won his first round heat in 8:21.01, advancing him to the finals. Updike led the final for much of the race but ultimately faded, finishing fifth.

In July, he became the second Alaskan man in history to run a sub-four minute mile after Trevor Dunbar, running 3:58.26 in Mission Viejo, California.

==== 2022 ====
In April 2022, Updike took first in the steeplechase at the Penn Relays, but would miss the US Championships due to a bout of COVID-19. After contracting the virus a second time in July, he was forced to shut down his season.

==== 2023 ====
In early 2023, he moved permanently to Flagstaff, Arizona to train with Under Armour's Mission Run Dark Sky team, under coach Stephen Haas.

In June 2023, Updike ran a personal best time of 8:17.47 in the 3000 metres steeplechase in Nice, France. In July 2023, he finished third in the US national championships in Eugene, Oregon. He was selected for the 2023 World Athletics Championships in Budapest in August 2023. In contention to qualify for the final, Updike was tripped from behind in his qualifying heat, but was reinstated into the finals after a protest. In the final, he finished sixteenth.

==== 2024 ====
He placed thirteenth at the US Indoor Championships in February 2024. In June 2025, he placed twelfth in the final of the 3000 metres steeplechase at the US Olympic Trials.

==== 2025 ====
He lowered his personal best to 8:13.68 to win the 3000 metres steeplechase at the Sunset Tour Los Angeles on 12 July 2025. The following month, he set a new personal best of 8:10.59 to place third in the 3000m steeplechase in the 2025 Diamond League at the 2025 Memorial Van Damme in Brussels, Belgium. He placed sixth in the 3000 metres steeplechase at the Diamond League Final in Zurich on 28 August. In September 2025, he competed in the 3000 metres steeplechase at the 2025 World Championships in Tokyo, Japan.
