= Kristian Imroth =

British steeplechaser (born 2002)

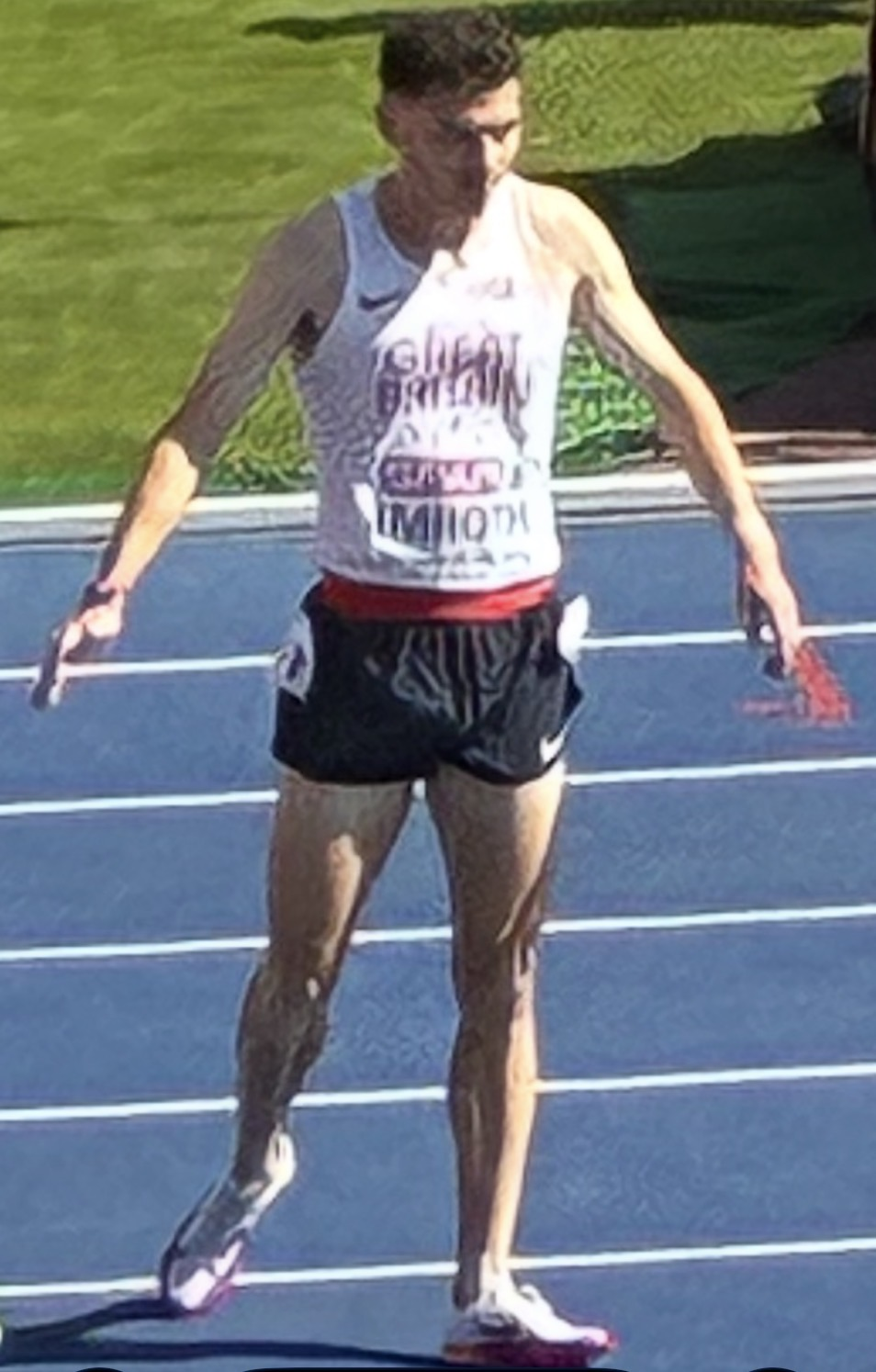
- Imroth in 2026

Personal information
- Born: 19 January 2002 (age 24)

Sport
- Sport: Athletics
- Events: Steeplechase, Cross country running
- Club: Shaftesbury Barnet Harriers

Achievements and titles
- Personal bests: Mile: 3:59.19 (2026); 3000m: 7:53.44 (2026); 3000m steeplechase: 8:18.97 (2026)

Kristian Imroth (born 19 January 2002) is a British steeplechaser and cross country runner. He won the 3000 metres steeplechase at the 2026 UK Athletics Championships.

== Biography ==
From Hertfordshire, he attended St Columba's College, St Albans, and won the U15 English National Cross-Country Championships running for Dacorum & Tring athletics club in 2017. The following year, he won the U17 1500m steeplechase at the 2018 English Schools' Track and Field Championships. He was selected for the 2019 European Athletics U20 Championships in Borås, Sweden, where he was a finalist in the 3000 metres steeplechase. As a member of Shaftesbury Barnet Harriers, he was part of the winning junior men’s team which at the English Cross Country Relays in 2021. He attended the University of Birmingham.

Having moved to compete in the United States for Eastern Kentucky University, Imroth ran a personal best 8:33.56 to win the men's 3000 metres steeplechase at the Raleigh Relays in March 2025. Competing at the 2025 NCAA Outdoor Championships, he qualified for the 3000m steeplechase final winning his semi-final in a personal best of 8:30.65 at Hayward Field in Eugene, Oregon, before placing twelfth in the final.

In May 2026, Imroth set a personal best 8:20.50 for the 3000 m steeplechase at the NCAA Regionals. On 12 June, he placed third in the 3000 metres steeplechase at the 2026 NCAA Outdoor Championships. On 21 June, he won the 3000 metres steeplechase at the 2026 UK Athletics Championships in 8:18.97. He was selected to represent England at the 2026 Commonwealth Games in Glasgow, placing seventh in the men's 3000 m steeplechase In August 2026, he qualified for the final of the men's 3000m steeplechase at the 2026 European Athletics Championships in Birmingham, and was leading Briton, finishing in 12th place.
