= Louis Gilavert =

French athlete (born 1998)

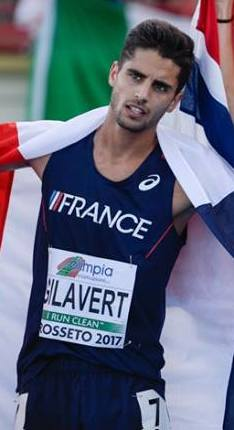
- Louis Gilavert at the 2017 European Athletics U20 Championships

Personal information
- Nationality: French
- Born: 1 January 1998 (age 28) Corbeil-Essonnes

Sport
- Sport: Athletics
- Event: 3000m steeplechase

Louis Gilavert (born 1 January 1998) is a French athlete specializing in the 3000 metres steeplechase.

He finished third in the junior race at the 2017 European Cross Country Championships behind winner Jakob Ingebrigtsen. He also finished third and behind Ingebrigtsen at the 2017 European Athletics U20 Championships.

As part of the French team for the delayed 2020 Summer Games in Tokyo, Gilavert finished twelfth in the third steeplechase heat.

He competed at the 2024 Summer Olympics in Paris in the 3000 metres steeplechase.

He was selected for the 2025 European Athletics Indoor Championships in Appeldoorn, where he qualified for the final of the men’s 1500 metres. He ran a new personal best of 3:32.25 for that distance at the 2025 Meeting de Paris.

In September 2025, he competed in the 3000 metres steeplechase at the 2025 World Championships in Tokyo, Japan.

== Personal bests ==
- 800 metres – 1:50.12 (Conflans-ste-Honorine 2024)
- 1500 metres – 3:32.25 (Paris 2025)
  - Indoor – 2:37.26i (Metz 2023)
- 3000 metres – 7:49.74i (Metz 2021)
- 3000 metres steeplechase – 8:13.47 (Marseille 2024)
