= Daniel Arce =

Spanish steeplechase runner

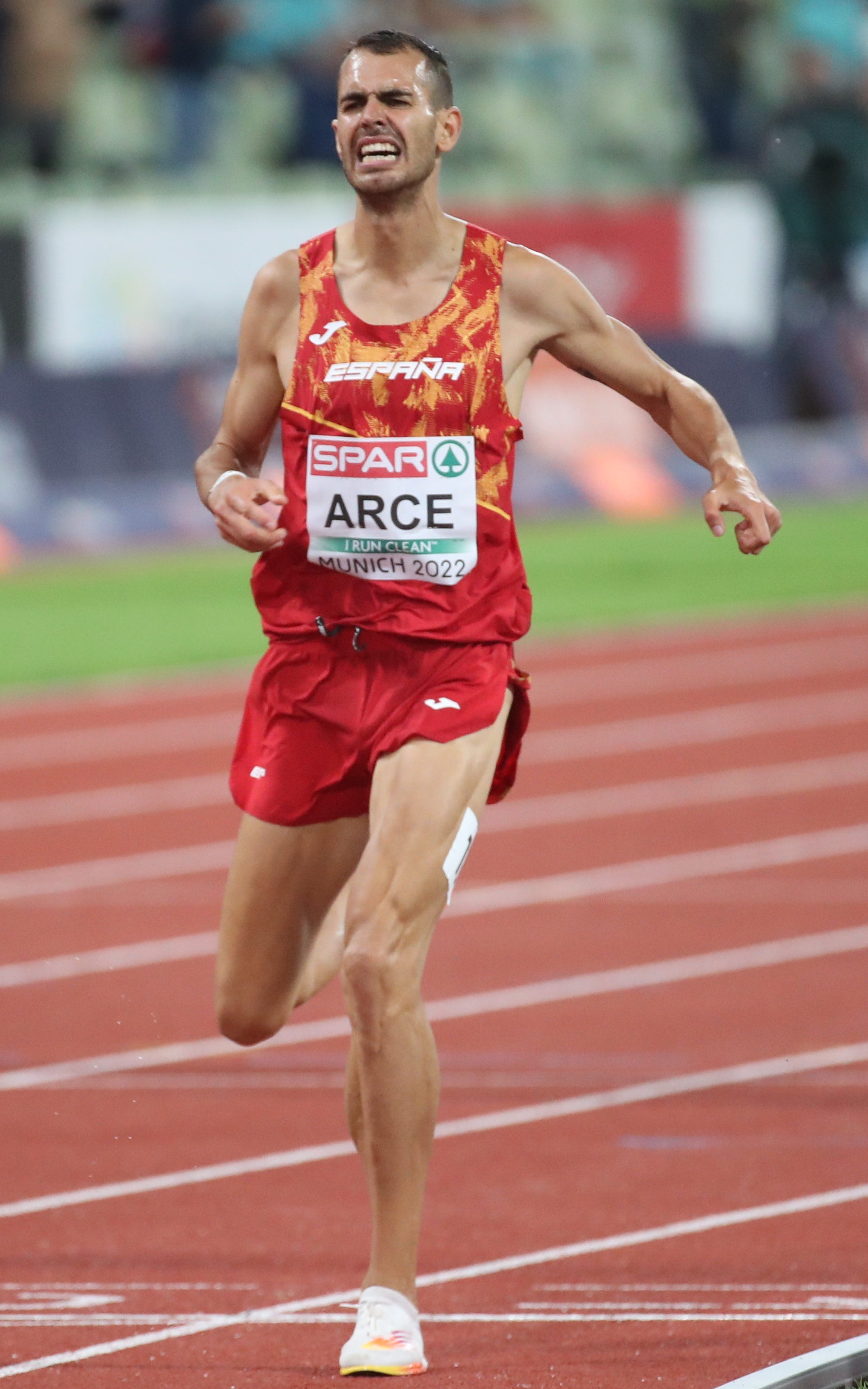

Personal information
- Full name: Daniel Arce Ibáñez
- Nicknames: Dani, Kaiman
- Nationality: Spanish
- Born: 22 April 1992 (age 34) Burgos, Spain
- Education: University of Burgos
- Height: 1.90 m (6 ft 3 in)
- Weight: 72 kg (159 lb)

Sport
- Sport: Athletics
- Event: 3000 metres steeplechase
- Coached by: José Enrique Villacorta; Benjamín Álvarez
Medal record
Men's athletics
Representing Spain
European Games
Gold medal – first place	2023 Kraków-Małopolska	3000 m steeplechase

Daniel Arce Ibáñez (born 22 April 1992, in Burgos) is a Spanish runner competing primarily in the 3000 metres steeplechase. He finished sixth at the 2018 European Championships. Additionally, he won a silver medal at the 2018 Ibero-American Championships.

== Personal bests ==
Outdoor

- 800 metres – 1:51.92 (León 2015)
- 1500 metres – 3:42.46 (Bilbao 2017)
- 3000 metres – 7:58.72 (Barcelona 2018)
- 10,000 metres – 30:08.30 (Jaén 2023)
- 3000 metres steeplechase – 8:10.63 (Paris 2023)
- 10 kilometres - 29:49 (Madrid 2020)

== International competitions ==
Year	Competition	Venue	Position	Event	Notes
Representing Spain
2010	World Junior Championships	Moncton, Canada	21st (h)	3000 m s'chase	9:10.82
2011	European Junior Championships	Tallinn, Estonia	10th	3000 m s'chase	9:13.07
2018	Mediterranean Games	Tarragona, Spain	8th	3000 m s'chase	8:43.67
2018	European Championships	Berlin, Germany	6th	3000 m s'chase	8:38.12
2018	Ibero-American Championships	Trujillo, Peru	2nd	3000 m s'chase	8:36.33
2019	World Championships	Doha, Qatar	28th (h)	3000 m s'chase	8:31.69
2021	Olympic Games	Tokyo, Japan	37th (h)	3000 m s'chase	8:38:09
2022	World Championships	Eugene, United States	9th	3000 m s'chase	8:30.05
2022	European Championships	Munich, Germany	3rd	3000 m s'chase	8:25.00
2023	European Games	Chorzów, Poland	1st	3000 m s'chase	8:25.88
2023	World Championships	Budapest, Hungary	9th	3000 m s'chase	8:18.31
2024	European Championships	Rome, Italy	5th	3000 m s'chase	8:16.70
2024	Olympic Games	Paris, France	10th	3000 m s'chase	8:13.80
2026	European Championships	Birmingham, United Kingdom	4th	3000 m s'chase	8:27.02
