= Tim Van de Velde =

Belgian steeplechaser (born 2000)

Personal information
- Born: 1 February 2000 (age 26)

Sport
- Sport: Athletics
- Event: 3000 metres steeplechase

Achievements and titles
- Personal bests: 3000 m s'chase: 8:14.40 (Brussels, 2025)
Medal record
Men's athletics
Representing Belgium
European Youth Championships
Gold medal – first place	2016 Tbilisi	2000m S'chase

Tim Van de Velde (born 1 February 2000) is a Belgian steeplechaser.

== Biography ==
He won the gold medal in the 2000 metres steeplechase at the 2016 European Athletics U18 Championships in Tbilisi, Georgia. In August 2017, Van de Velde set a new Belgian junior record for the 2000m steeplechase with a time of i5:43:52 in Kappelen, breaking the 40-year-old record held by Peter Daenens from 1977. He placed seventh in the 2018 World Athletics U20 Championships in Tampere, Finland.

He won the senior Belgian Athletics Championships in 2021 in the 3000 metres steeplechase in Brussels. He competed for Belgium at the 2022 World Athletics Championships in Eugene, Oregon, but was forced to retire from his heat after suffering a sprained ankle.

In May 2024, Van de Velde qualified for the European Championships at the Meeting Iberoamericano in Huelva, Spain with a time of 8:18.68 in the 3000m steeplechase, a significant improvement on his personal best which previously stood at 8:24.56. With the time, he also moved up to fourth on the Belgian all-time list. He subsequently competed for Belgium at the 2024 European Athletics Championships in Rome, Italy, but was forced to retire from his heat after suffering a fall.

He won the 3000 metres steeplechase at the 2025 Belgian Athletics Championships in Brussels in early August. He set a new personal best of 8:14.40 in the 2025 Diamond League at the 2025 Memorial Van Damme in Brussels, Belgium in August 2025. He placed ninth in the 3000 metres steeplechase at the Diamond League Final in Zurich on 28 August.

In September 2025, he competed in the 3000 metres steeplechase at the 2025 World Championships in Tokyo, Japan. During the race, after Colombia's Carlos San Martin was injured during a fall, as they approached the finish line, Van de Velde decided to turn back to help San Martin to cross the finish line – fully aware that it might lead to his disqualification – in a true demonstration of sportsmanship and humanity. For this he was awarded in November 2025 World Athletics's International Fair Play Award.

In August 2026, he competed at the 2026 European Athletics Championships in Birmingham, England, in the 3000 metres steeplechase.
