= Andorran Athletics Federation =

Governing body for the sport of athletics in Andorra

- Federació Andorrana d'Atletisme
- Sport: Athletics
- Abbreviation: FAA
- Founded: 1984
- Affiliation: World Athletics
- Affiliation date: 1989
- Regional affiliation: EAA
- Headquarters: Andorra la Vella
- President: Bernat Vilella Sala
- Secretary: Xavier Bossa Atmetlló

Official website
- faa.ad
- (Andorra)

The Andorran Athletics Federation (Catalan: Federació Andorrana d'Atletisme, FAA) is the governing body for the sport of athletics in Andorra. Former president was Judit Gómez Travesset. In 2012, Eduard Ricard García was elected new president, but in 2015 he resigned.

== History ==
FAA was founded in 1984, and was affiliated to the IAAF in 1989.

== Presidents ==
Starting with the foundation of FAA in 1984, the following persons served as president:

Name	Presidency
Francesc Costa Vinyals	1984–1992
Josep Sansa Font	1992–2002
Interim Governing Board	2002–2003
Josep Graells Esquius	2003–2008
Judit Gómez Travesset	2008–2012
Eduard Ricard García	2012–2015

== Affiliations ==
- World Athletics
- European Athletic Association (EAA)
- Asociación Iberoamericana de Atletismo (AIA; Ibero-American Athletics Association)

Moreover, it is part of the following national organisations:

- Andorran Olympic Committee (COA; Catalan: Comitè Olímpic Andorrà)

== National records ==
FAA maintains the Andorran records in athletics.
