= Karl Bebendorf =

German track and field athlete

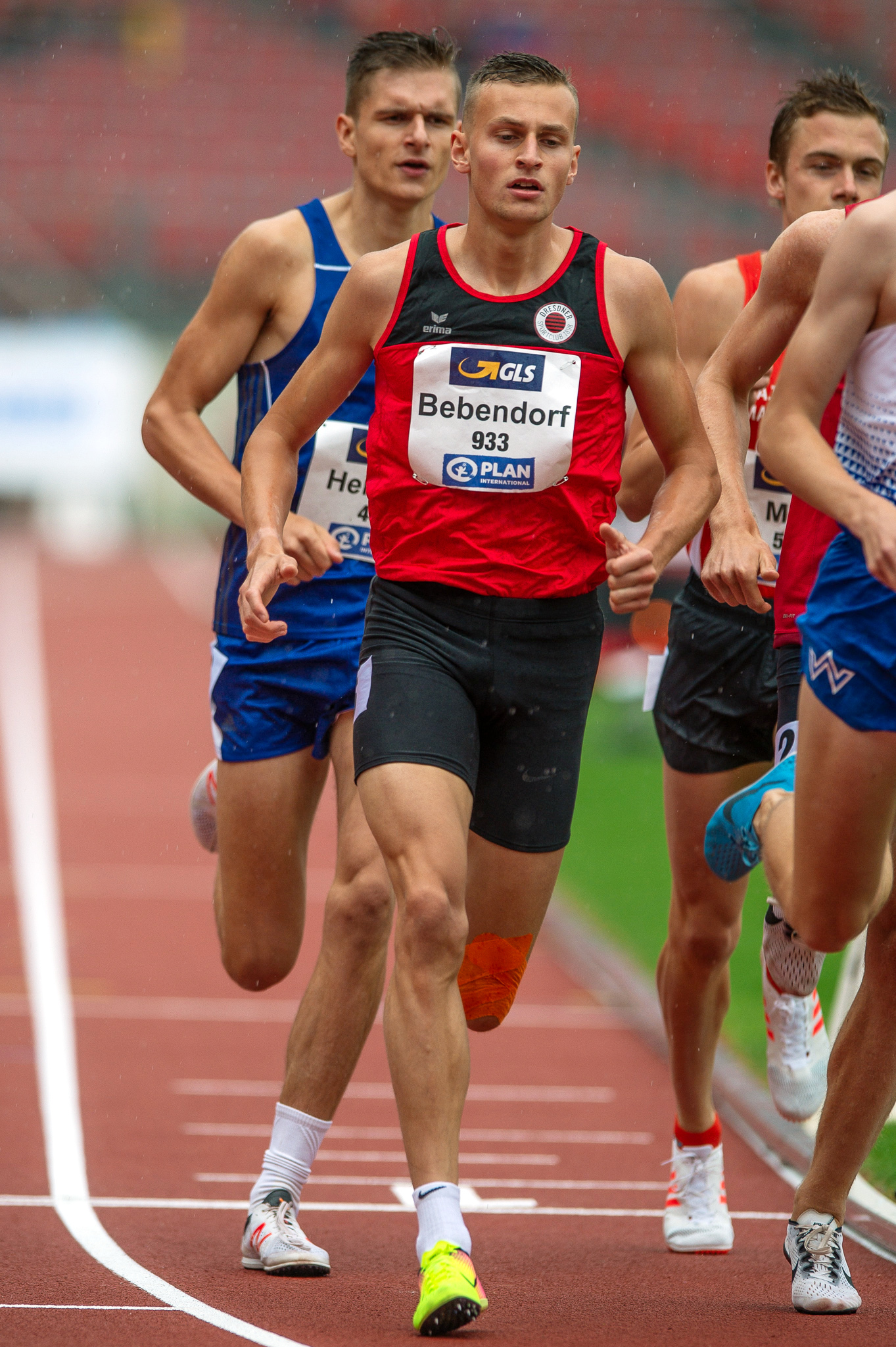
- Bebendorf in 2018

Personal information
- Born: 7 May 1996 (age 30) Dresden, Germany

Sport
- Country: Germany
- Sport: Track and field
- Events: 1500 metres; 3000 metres steeplechase
Medal record
Men's athletics
Representing Germany
European Championships
Bronze medal – third place	2024 Rome	3000 m steeplechase
Bronze medal – third place	2026 Birmingham	3000 m steeplechase
German Athletics Championships
Gold medal – first place	2019 Berlin	3000 m s'chase
Gold medal – first place	2020 Braunschweig	3000 m s'chase

Karl Bebendorf (born 7 May 1996) is a German track and field athlete competing for the Dresdner SC 1898 under coach Dietmar Jarosch.

== Career ==
In 2019, Bebendorf competed in the men's 3000 metres steeplechase event at the World Athletics Championships held in Doha, Qatar. However, he did not qualify to compete in the final. In the same year, he finished in 7th place in the men's 1500 metres at the 2019 European Athletics Indoor Championships held in Glasgow, United Kingdom..

In 2021, he competed in the men's 1500 metres event at the 2021 European Athletics Indoor Championships held in Toruń, Poland, where he was eliminated in the heats. Furthermore, Bebendorf competed in the men's 3000 metres steeplechase event at the 2020 Summer Olympics held in Tokyo, Japan the same year placing 34th.

In 2022, he placed 4th at the European Athletics Championships in Munich in the 3000m steeplechase.

In 2023, he competed at the 2023 World Athletics Championships in Budapest placing 20th overall with a performance of 8:22.23min.

In 2024, Bebendorf won a bronze medal at the 2024 European Athletics Championships held in Rome, Italy. In addition, he participated at the 2024 Olympic Games in Paris not reaching the final and placing 19th in the 3000m steeplechase.

The following year, 2025, he placed 7th with the German team at the Team European Championship; however, he won his event (3000m steeplechase) with a Championship record.

In 2026, he won another bronze medal at the 2026 European Athletics Championships in Birmingham following the improvement of his personal best to 8:05.55min. in June in France.

On a national level, he secured multiple German Championship titles, among those the 300m steeplechase title between 2019 and 2023, and 2025/2026.

== Personal bests ==
3000m steeplechase: 8:05,55min.

1500m: 3:37,52min.

2000m steeplechase: 5:18.29min.
