= Nahuel Carabaña =

Andorran steeplechaser (born 1999)

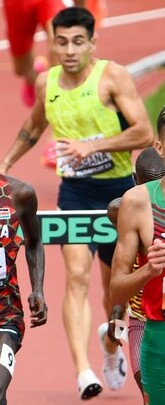

Personal information
- Full name: Nahuel Carabaña Valenzuela
- Born: 10 November 1999 (age 26) Andorra la Vella, Andorra
- Height: 1.71 m (5 ft 7 in)

Sport
- Sport: Athletics
- Event: 3000 metres steeplechase

Nahuel Quetzal Carabaña Valenzuela (born 10 November 1999) is an Andorran runner specialising in the 3000 metres steeplechase. He is the 2023 Games of the Small States of Europe champion in the 3000 metres steeplechase. He is the 2022 Ibero-American Championships and 2017 and 2019 Games of the Small States of Europe silver medalist in the 3000 metres steeplechase and the 2023 Games of the Small States of Europe silver medalist in 5000 metres. He is the national record holder in 3000 metres, 5000 metres, 10,000 metres, and 3000 metres steeplechase.

== Early life ==
Carabaña was born on 10 November 1999, in Andorra la Vella, to a Spanish father and an Argentine mother.

== Career ==
Carabaña won the silver medal in 3000 metres steeplechase at the 2017 Games of the Small States of Europe. He then repeated this result at the 2019 Games of the Small States of Europe, where he also finished fourth in the 10,000 metres race.

Carabaña won the bronze medal in 3000 metres steeplechase at the 2021 European U23 Championships, marking the first time Andorra had won a medal at the European U23 Championships. He then won a silver medal in the same event at the 2022 Ibero-American Championships, setting a new national record in the process.

Carabaña competed in the 3000 metres steeplechase at the 2022 European Championships. During the heats, Danish athlete Axel Vang Christensen was injured during the race. Carabaña turned around to help Vang Christensen move off the course; Carabaña finished the race in last place and received a standing ovation from the crowd. He received a World Fair Play Award from the International Fair Play Committee.

At the 2023 Games of the Small States of Europe, Carabaña won the gold medal in the 3000 metres steeplechase and the silver medal in the 5000 metres. He made his World Championships debut in 2023 but did not advance beyond the heats. He placed seventh in the 3000 metres steeplechase final at the 2024 European Championships. This was the first time an Andorran athlete reached a final at the European Athletics Championships.

Carabaña set a new national record in the 3000 metres steeplechase at the 2024 International Marseille Meeting with a time of 8:16.04. He qualified to compete in the 3000 metres steeplechase at the 2024 Summer Olympics through his world ranking. As one of only two Andorran athletes at the Games, he was a flagbearer in the opening ceremony. He failed to advance to the final after finishing seventh in his heat.

== International competitions ==
Year	Competition	Venue	Position	Event	Notes
Representing Andorra
2016	European Youth Championships	Tbilisi, Georgia	18th (h)	2000 m s'chase	6:05.76
2017	Games of the Small States of Europe	Serravalle, San Marino	2nd	3000 m s'chase	9:16.96
2017	European U20 Championships	Grosseto, Italy	20th (h)	3000 m s'chase	9:48.58
2018	Mediterranean U23 Championships	Jesolo, Italy	7th	3000 m s'chase	9:36.55
2018	World U20 Championships	Tampere, Finland	27th (h)	3000 m s'chase	9:37.30
2019	Games of the Small States of Europe	Bar, Montenegro	4th	10,000 m	31:55.95
2019	Games of the Small States of Europe	Bar, Montenegro	2nd	3000 m s'chase	8:59.74
2019	European U23 Championships	Gävle, Sweden	15th	3000 m s'chase	9:21.17
2021	European U23 Championships	Tallinn, Estonia	3rd	3000 m s'chase	8:39.17
2022	Ibero-American Championships	La Nucía, Spain	2nd	3000 m s'chase	8:35.19
2022	Mediterranean Games	Oran, Algeria	12th	1500 m	3:51.89
2022	European Championships	Munich, Germany	32nd (h)	3000 m s'chase	9:37.74
2023	Games of the Small States of Europe	Marsa, Malta	2nd	5000 m	14:05.16
2023	Games of the Small States of Europe	Marsa, Malta	1st	3000 m s'chase	8:54.95
2023	European Games	Chorzów, Poland	16th	3000 m s'chase	8:48.79
2023	World Championships	Budapest, Hungary	23rd (h)	3000 m s'chase	8:27.05
2024	European Championships	Rome, Italy	7th	3000 m s'chase	8:21.08
2024	Championships of the Small States of Europe	Gibraltar	–	5000 m	DNF
2024	Olympic Games	Paris, France	13th (h)	3000 m s'chase	8:19.44
2025	Games of the Small States of Europe	Andorra la Vella, Andorra	1st	5000 m	14:42.41
2025	Games of the Small States of Europe	Andorra la Vella, Andorra	1st	10,000 m	30:48.39
2025	Games of the Small States of Europe	Andorra la Vella, Andorra	1st	3000 m s'chase	9:09.50
2026	European Championships	Birmingham, United Kingdom	28th (h)	3000 m s'chase	8:57.80
2026	Mediterranean Games	Taranto, Italy	9th	3000 m s'chase	9:07.76

== Personal bests ==
Outdoor

- 1500 metres – 3:51.89 (Oran 2022)
- 3000 metres – 8:01.65 (Sabadell 2023) NR
- 5000 metres – 14:05.16 (Marsa 2023) NR
- 10,000 metres – 28:51.57 (Burjassot 2023)NR
- 3000 metres steeplechase – 8:16.04 (Marseille 2024) NR
- 10 kilometres – 28:04 (Valencia 2026)

Indoor

- 1500 metres – 3:48.74 (Sabadell 2022)
- 3000 metres – 7:54.02 (Mondeville 2024) NR

Olympic Games
Preceded by Maeva Estevez	Flag bearer for Andorra; Paris 2024 with Mònica Dòria	Succeeded by Joan Verdú; Irineu Esteve Altimiras
