= Ala Zoghlami =

Italian middle-distance runner

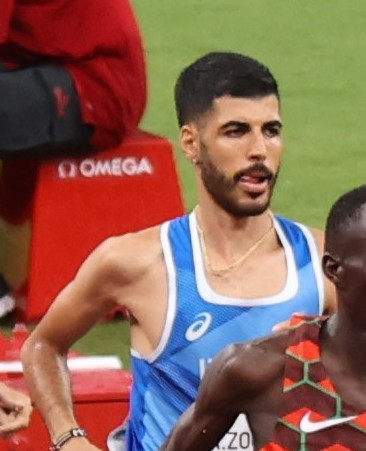
- Ala Zoghlami at the 2020 Olympics.

Personal information
- National team: Italy
- Born: 19 June 1994 (age 32) Tunis, Tunisia
- Height: 1.80 m (5 ft 11 in)
- Weight: 57 kg (126 lb)

Sport
- Sport: Athletics
- Events: Middle-distance running 3000 metres steeplechase
- Club: Cus Palermo
- Coached by: Gaspare Polizzi

Achievements and titles
- Personal best: 3000 m steeplechase 8:24.98 (2021)

Ala Zoghlami (Arabic: علاء الزغلامي; born 19 June 1994) is a Tunisian-born Italian male middle-distance runner and steeplechaser. He competed at the 2020 Summer Olympics, in 3000 m steeplechase.

He has a twin, also an athlete, named Osama.

== Career ==
Having obtained the IAAF standard for participating in the 2017 World Championships, in the quarter-finals of the event he set his personal best, resulting in being the fastest excluded from the semi-finals by only 32 hundredths of a second.

== Personal best ==
- 3000 m steeplechase: 8:14.06 - (Japan) Tokyo, 7 August 2021

== Achievements ==
Year	Competition	Venue	Position	Event	Time	Notes
2015	European U23 Championships	(Estonia) Tallinn	4th	3000 m steeplechase	8:42.85	
2017	World Championships	(United Kingdom) London	16th el. QF	3000 m steeplechase	8:26.18	PB
2022	European Championships	(Germany) Munich	7th	3000 m steeplechase	8:27.82	

== National titles ==
Ala Zoghlami won seven national championships at individual senior level.

- Italian Athletics Championships
  - 5000 m: 2020 (1)
  - 3000 m steeplechase: 2017, 2020, 2021 (3)
- Italian Cross Country Championships
  - Short course: 2021, 2022, 2023 (3)
