= Osama Zoghlami =

Italian middle and long-distance runner

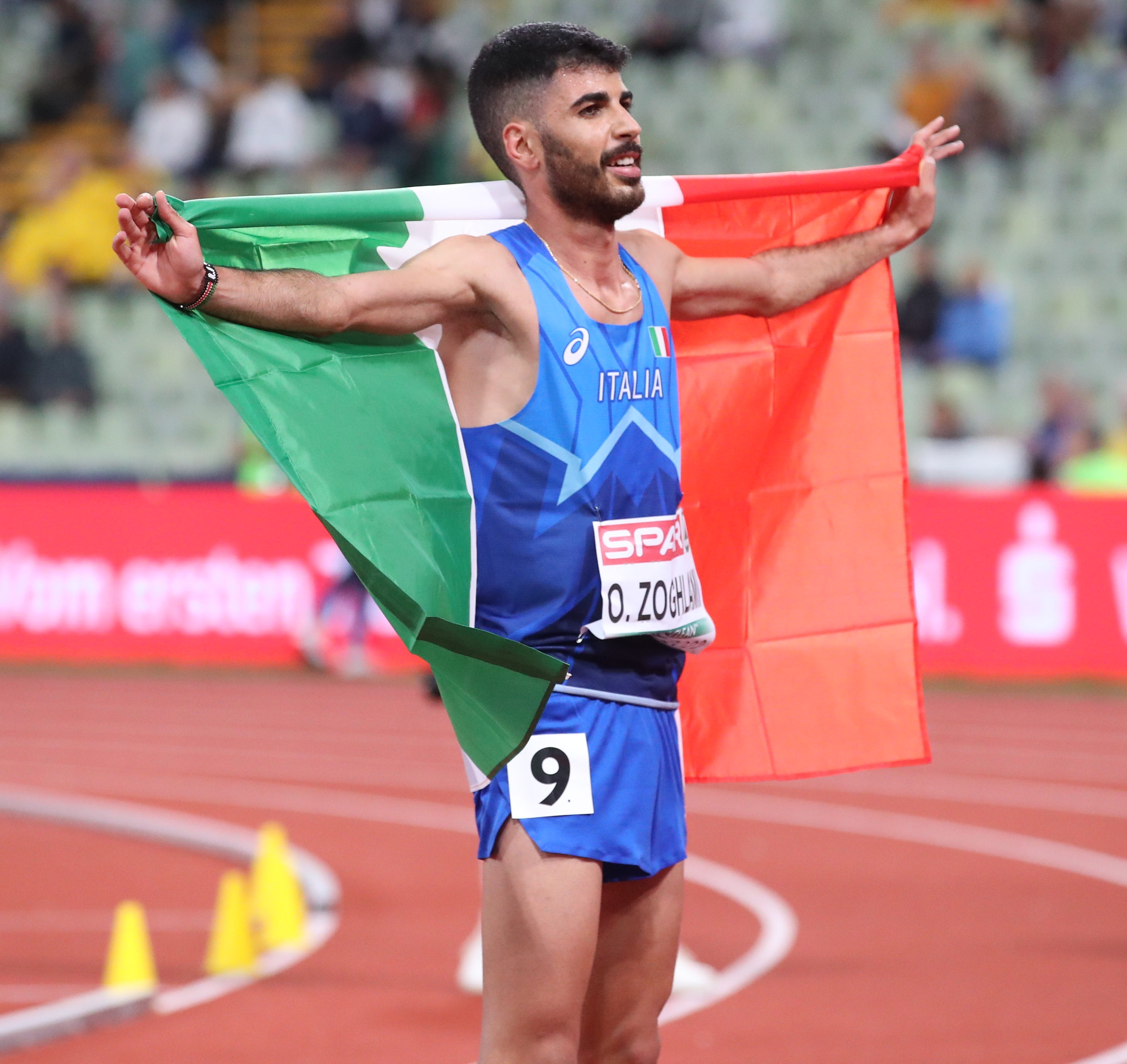
- Osama at the European Championships 2022

Personal information
- Nickname: Ussem
- National team: Italy
- Born: 19 June 1994 (age 32) Tunis, Tunisia
- Height: 1.80 m (5 ft 11 in)
- Weight: 57 kg (126 lb)

Sport
- Sport: Athletics
- Events: Middle-distance running 3000 metres steeplechase
- Club: Cus Palermo; C.S. Aeronautica Militare
- Coached by: Gaspare Polizzi

Achievements and titles
- Personal best: 3000 m steeplechase 8:11.00 (2022)
Medal record
European Championships
Bronze medal – third place	2022 Munich	3000 m st.
European Team Championships
Bronze medal – third place	2021 Silesia	3000 m steeplechase

Osama "Ussem" Zoghlami (Arabic: أسامة الزغلامي; born 19 June 1994) is a Tunisian-born Italian male middle-distance runner and steeplechaser. He competed at the 2020 Summer Olympics in the 3000 m steeplechase, and at the 2024 Summer Olympics in the 3000 m steeplechase.

He has a twin, also an athlete, named Ala.

== Career ==
At the Golden Gala 2019 he obtained the IAAF standard for participating in the 2019 World Championships.

== Personal best ==
- 3000 m steeplechase: 8:11.00 - (Italy) Rome, Golden Gala, 9 June 2022

== Achievements ==
Year	Competition	Venue	Position	Event	Time	Notes
2018	European Championships	(Germany) Berlin	21st el. SF	3000 m st	8:43.92	
2022	European Championships	(Germany) Munich	3rd	3000 m st	8:23.44	

== See also ==
- Italian all-time top lists - 3000 metres steeplechase
- Naturalized athletes of Italy
