= Frederik Ruppert =

German runner

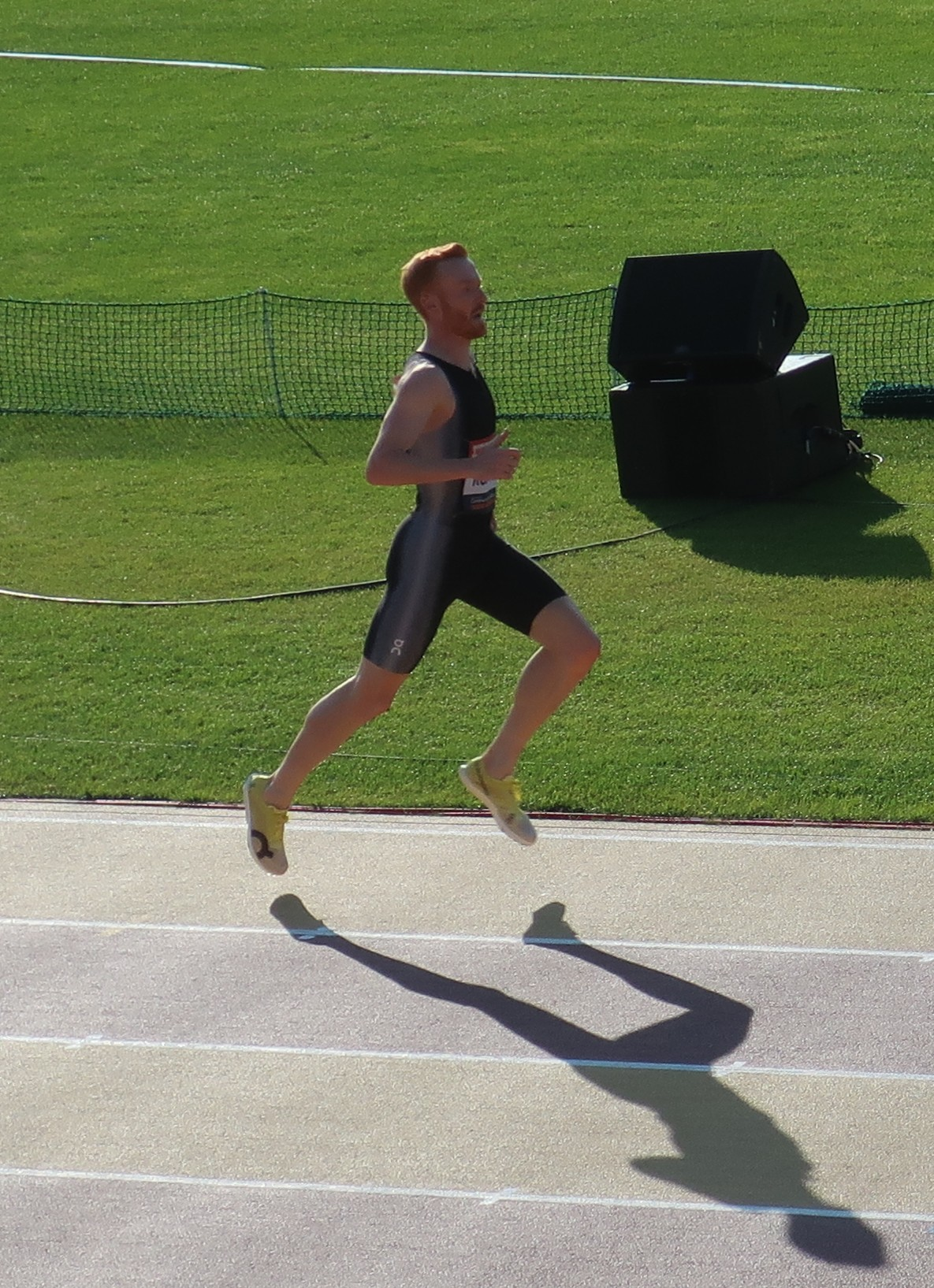
- Ruppert in 2025

Personal information
- Born: 19 February 1997 (age 29) Aachen
- Height: 1.84 m (6 ft 0 in)

Sport
- Country: Germany
- Sport: Track and field
- Event: 3000 metres steeplechase
- Club: LAV Tübingen
- Coached by: Isabelle Baumann
Medal record
Men's athletics
Representing Germany
European Championships
Gold medal – first place	2026 Birmingham	3000 m steeplechase
Diamond League
First place	2025	3000 m st
European Under-23 Championships
Gold medal – first place	2019 Gävle	3000 m steeplechase
German Championships
Gold medal – first place	2024 Braunschweig	3000 m s'chase
Gold medal – first place	2026 Bochum-Wattenscheid	5000m

Frederik Ruppert (born 19 February 1997) is a German runner, who specializes in the 3000 metres steeplechase and competes for LAV Tübingen.

== Career ==
He competed in the 3000 metres steeplechase event at the 2022 World Athletics Championships, in Eugene, USA and was the 2019 European U23 Champion in the event.

In 2024, he qualified for the 2024 Summer Olympics and placed 23rd. The same year he also won the steeplechase at the 2024 German Athletics Championships after placing second in 2021 and 2022. He placed fourth at the 2024 European Championships in Rome with a new personal record of 8:15.08min.

In 2025, he improved his personal best to 8.01,49min. at the Diamond League in Rabat setting a new German record. In addition, Ruppert placed second at the 2025 German Athletics Championships and later won the Diamond League 2025 in the same event.

In 2026, he set a new area and national record at the Diamond League in Rabat with a time of 7:57.80min. making him the first European runner to go sub-8 minutes. Subsequently, he competed at the 2026 European Athletics Championships in Birmingham as the favourite and secured gold in the 3000m steeplechase. On national level, he placed second in the 3000m at the German Indoor Athletics Championships, while competing in and winning the 5000m at the German Outdoor Athletics Championships.

== Personal bests ==
- 1500 metres – 3:45.34 (Bottrop 2018)
- 3000 metres – 7:48.36i (Ghent 2024)
- 3000 metres steeplechase – 7:57.80 NR (Rabat 2026)
