= Andorra at the 2012 European Athletics Championships =

Andorra was represented by four athletes at the 2012 European Athletics Championships in Finland. They all finished in the last position of their events.

== Results ==
=== Men ===
==== Track ====
Event	Athletes	Heats		Semifinal		Final	
Event	Athletes	Result	Rank	Result	Rank	Result	Rank
100 m	Mikel de Sa	11.26	31	DNQ			

=== Women ===
==== Track ====
Event	Athletes	Heats		Semifinal		Final	
Event	Athletes	Result	Rank	Result	Rank	Result	Rank
100 m	Cristina Llovera	13.01	32	DNQ			
200 m	Sònia Villacampa	27.90	30	DNQ			

==== Field ====
Event	Athletes	Qualification		Final	
Event	Athletes	Result	Rank	Result	Rank
Long jump	Anna Sirvent	4.43	30	DNQ	
