= Vidar Johansson =

Swedish long-distance runner (born 1996)

Personal information
- Born: 8 October 1996 (age 29) Halmstad, Sweden

Sport
- Sport: Athletics
- Event: 3000 m steeplechase

Achievements and titles
- Personal bests: Outdoor; 3000 m steeplechase: 8:18.31 (Castellón 2021); 5000 m: 13:58.05 (Göteborg 2020); Indoor; 1500 m: 3:43.5h (Göteborg 2021); 3000 m: 7:56.4h (Sollentuna 2021)

Vidar Johansson (born 8 October 1996) is a Swedish long-distance runner. He competed in the 3000 metres steeplechase at the 2020 Summer Olympics.
