= Andorra at the 2010 European Athletics Championships =

Sporting event delegation

Andorra will be represented by 6 athletes at the 2010 European Athletics Championships held in Barcelona, Spain.

== Participants ==
=== Men ===
Athlete	Events	Heat		Final	
Athlete	Events	Result	Rank	Result	Rank
Pep Sansa Bullich	3000 m steeplechase	9:24.39	23	Did not advance	
Toni Bernado	Marathon			2:30:52	33
Alan Manchado	Marathon			3:12:40	45
Iván Ramírez	Marathon			2:51:42	43
Jordi Royo	Marathon			Did not Finish	

== Results ==
2010 Barcelona	Gold	Silver	Bronze	Total
Andorra (AND)	0	0	0	0
