= 2025 Memorial Van Damme =

Athletics meeting in Brussels, Belgium

- Dates: 22 August 2025
- Host city: Brussels, Belgium
- Venue: King Baudouin Stadium
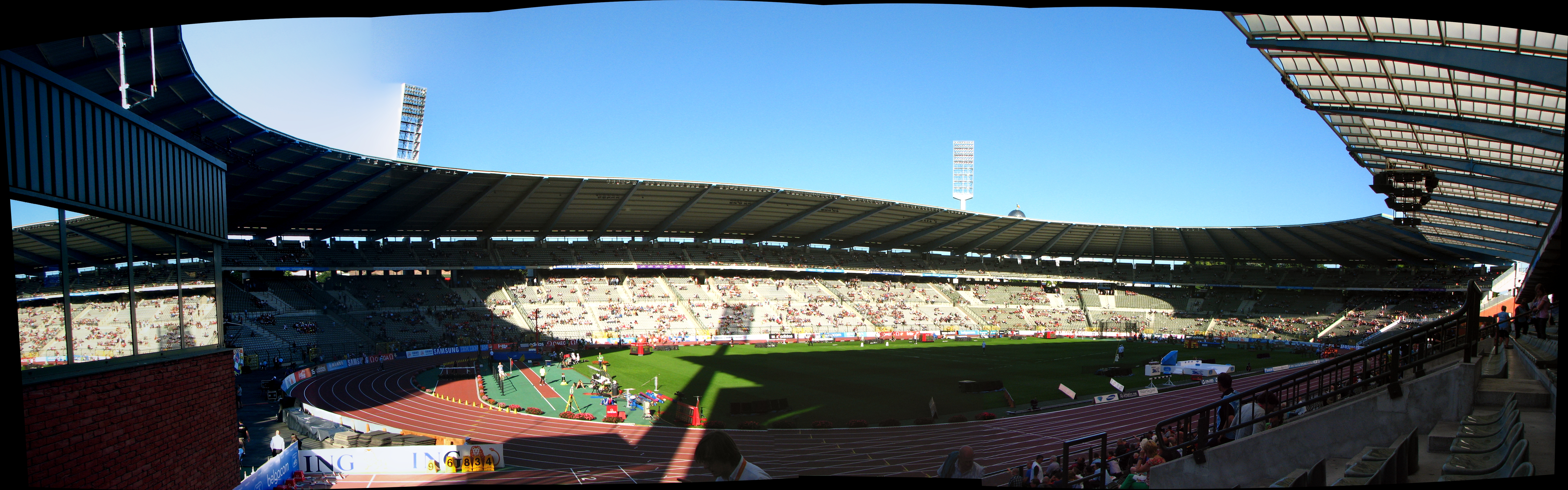
- Level: 2025 Diamond League

The 2025 Memorial Van Damme was the 49th edition of the annual outdoor track and field meeting in Brussels, Belgium. Held on 22 August at the King Baudouin Stadium, it was the fourteenth leg of the 2025 Diamond League – the highest level international track and field circuit.

== Diamond+ events results ==
Starting in 2025 a new discipline of events was added called Diamond+, these 4 events per meet awarded athletes with increased prize money whilst keeping the standard points format to qualify for the Diamond league finals. First place earns 8 points, with each step down in place earning one less point than the previous, until no points are awarded in 9th place or lower. In the case of a tie, each tying athlete earns the full amount of points for the place.

=== Men's ===
3000 metres steeplechase
Place	Athlete	Nation	Time	Points	Notes
1st place, gold medalist(s)	Ruben Querinjean	Luxembourg	8:09.47	8	NR
2nd place, silver medalist(s)	Getnet Wale	Ethiopia	8:09.62	7	
3rd place, bronze medalist(s)	Isaac Updike	United States	8:10.59	6	PB
4	Abraham Kibiwot	Kenya	8:11.26	5	
5	Karl Bebendorf	Germany	8:11.72	4	
6	Daniel Arce	Spain	8:12.77	3	
7	Tim van de Velde	Belgium	8:14.40	2	PB
8	Zakaria El Ahlaami	Qatar	8:15.41	1	PB
9	Benard Keter	United States	8:16.11		PB
10	Eisa Girma	Ethiopia	8:17.06		PB
11	Simon Koech	Kenya	8:17.10		
—	Mohamed Tindouft	Morocco	DNF		
—	Wesley Langat	Kenya	DNF		PM
—	Wilberforce Kones	Kenya	DNF		PM

Discus throw
Place	Athlete	Nation	Distance	Points	Notes
1st place, gold medalist(s)	Ralford Mullings	Jamaica	69.66 m	8	
2nd place, silver medalist(s)	Mykolas Alekna	Lithuania	68.82 m	7	
3rd place, bronze medalist(s)	Kristjan Čeh	Slovenia	67.13 m	6	
4	Daniel Ståhl	Sweden	67.10 m	5	
5	Matthew Denny	Australia	66.29 m	4	
6	Henrik Janssen	Germany	65.80 m	3	
7	Rojé Stona	Jamaica	65.67 m	2	
—	Lawrence Okoye	Great Britain	NM		

=== Women's ===
5000 metres
Place	Athlete	Nation	Time	Points	Notes
1st place, gold medalist(s)	Agnes Jebet Ngetich	Kenya	14:24.99	8	
2nd place, silver medalist(s)	Likina Amebaw	Ethiopia	14:31.51	7	
3rd place, bronze medalist(s)	Aleshign Baweke	Ethiopia	14:31.88	6	
4	Josette Andrews	United States	14:33.16	5	
5	Marta García	Spain	14:33.40	4	NR
6	Maureen Koster	Netherlands	14:33.97	3	PB
7	Hirut Meshesha	Ethiopia	14:35.36	2	
8	Caroline Nyaga	Kenya	14:36.90	1	
9	Nozomi Tanaka	Japan	14:37.19		
10	Jana Van Lent	Belgium	14:37.47		NR
11	Weini Kelati	United States	14:37.77		SB
12	Marta Alemayo	Ethiopia	14:38.65		
13	Karissa Schweizer	United States	14:39.30		SB
14	Elise Vanderelst	Belgium	14:40.70		PB
15	Innes Fitzgerald	Great Britain	14:48.84		
16	Abeba Aregawi	Sweden	15:15.88		
—	Francine Niyomukunzi	Burundi	DNF		
—	Janeth Chepngetich	Kenya	DNF		PM
—	Winnie Nanyondo	Uganda	DNF		PM
—	Purity Chepkirui	Kenya	DNF		PM

Pole vault
Place	Athlete	Nation	Height	Points	Notes
1st place, gold medalist(s)	Katie Moon	United States	4.85 m	8	SB
2nd place, silver medalist(s)	Molly Caudery	Great Britain	4.80 m	7	
3rd place, bronze medalist(s)	Hana Moll	United States	4.74 m	6	
4	Imogen Ayris	New Zealand	4.64 m	5	
5	Amálie Švábíková	Czech Republic	4.64 m	4	
6	Emily Grove	United States	4.64 m	3	
6	Tina Šutej	Slovenia	4.64 m	3	
8	Sandi Morris	United States	4.54 m	1	
8	Elien Vekemans	Belgium	4.54 m		
10	Amanda Moll	United States	4.44 m		
11	Roberta Bruni	Italy	4.24 m		
11	Gabriela Leon	United States	4.24 m		

== Diamond events results ==
=== Men's ===
200 metres
Place	Athlete	Nation	Time	Points	Notes
1st place, gold medalist(s)	Alexander Ogando	Dominican Republic	20.16	8	
2nd place, silver medalist(s)	Robert Gregory	United States	20.19	7	
3rd place, bronze medalist(s)	Udodi Onwuzurike	Nigeria	20.29	6	
4	Christian Coleman	United States	20.42	5	
5	Makanakaishe Charamba	Zimbabwe	20.57	4	
6	Joseph Fahnbulleh	Liberia	20.58	3	
7	Kyree King	United States	20.66	2	
8	Kobe Vleminckx	Belgium	21.40	1	
			Wind: (−0.3 m/s)		

400 metres
Place	Athlete	Nation	Time	Points	Notes
1st place, gold medalist(s)	Jacory Patterson	United States	44.05	8	
2nd place, silver medalist(s)	Vernon Norwood	United States	44.62	7	
3rd place, bronze medalist(s)	Charlie Dobson	Great Britain	44.81	6	
4	Daniel Segers	Belgium	44.90	5	
5	Muzala Samukonga	Zambia	44.91	4	
6	Collen Kebinatshipi	Botswana	45.09	3	
7	Alexander Doom	Belgium	45.27	2	
8	Bayapo Ndori	Botswana	45.35	1	

1500 metres
Place	Athlete	Nation	Time	Points	Notes
1st place, gold medalist(s)	Niels Laros	Netherlands	3:30.58	8	SB
2nd place, silver medalist(s)	Phanuel Koech	Kenya	3:31.41	7	
3rd place, bronze medalist(s)	Yared Nuguse	United States	3:31.51	6	
4	Isaac Nader	Portugal	3:31.77	5	
5	Reynold Cheruiyot	Kenya	3:31.86	4	
6	Samuel Pihlström	Sweden	3:32.28	3	
7	Ruben Verheyden	Belgium	3:32.71	2	
8	Louis Gilavert	France	3:32.78	1	
9	Jake Wightman	Great Britain	3:32.95		
10	Neil Gourley	Great Britain	3:33.21		
11	Pieter Sisk	Belgium	3:33.30		
12	Jochem Vermeulen	Belgium	3:33.42		SB
13	Andrew Coscoran	Ireland	3:35.76		
14	Hobbs Kessler	United States	3:36.65		
15	Kethobogile Haingura	Botswana	3:36.70		
—	Abel Kipsang	Kenya	DNF		
—	Boaz Kiprugut	Kenya	DNF		PM
—	Mounir Akbache	France	DNF		PM

High jump
Place	Athlete	Nation	Height	Points	Notes
1st place, gold medalist(s)	Oleh Doroshchuk	Ukraine	2.25 m	8	
2nd place, silver medalist(s)	Thomas Carmoy	Belgium	2.25 m	7	
3rd place, bronze medalist(s)	Romaine Beckford	Jamaica	2.22 m	6	
4	Hamish Kerr	New Zealand	2.18 m	5	
4	Tomohiro Shinno	Japan	2.18 m	5	
6	Marco Fassinotti	Italy	2.18 m	3	
7	Elijah Kosiba	United States	2.18 m	2	
8	Shelby McEwen	United States	2.14 m	1	
8	Jef Vermeiren	Belgium	2.14 m		
10	Dmytro Nikitin	Ukraine	2.14 m		

Javelin throw
Place	Athlete	Nation	Distance	Points	Notes
1st place, gold medalist(s)	Julian Weber	Germany	89.65 m	8	
2nd place, silver medalist(s)	Keshorn Walcott	Trinidad and Tobago	86.30 m	7	SB
3rd place, bronze medalist(s)	Anderson Peters	Grenada	85.17 m	6	
4	Oliver Helander	Finland	83.97 m	5	SB
5	Julius Yego	Kenya	80.50 m	4	
6	Edis Matusevičius	Lithuania	79.60 m	3	
7	Andrian Mardare	Moldova	77.49 m	2	
8	Timothy Herman	Belgium	74.72 m	1	
9	Leandro Ramos	Portugal	73.14 m		

=== Women's ===
100 metres
Place	Athlete	Nation	Time	Points	Notes
1st place, gold medalist(s)	Melissa Jefferson-Wooden	United States	10.76	8	
2nd place, silver medalist(s)	Sha'Carri Richardson	United States	11.08	7	
3rd place, bronze medalist(s)	Daryll Neita	Great Britain	11.15	6	
4	Shelly-Ann Fraser-Pryce	Jamaica	11.17	5	
5	Favour Ofili	Nigeria	11.19	4	
6	Maia McCoy	United States	11.21	3	
7	Delphine Nkansa	Belgium	11.24	2	SB
8	Patrizia van der Weken	Luxembourg	11.25	1	
9	Rani Rosius	Belgium	11.42		
			Wind: (−0.2 m/s)		

1500 metres
Place	Athlete	Nation	Time	Points	Notes
1st place, gold medalist(s)	Nikki Hiltz	United States	3:55.94	8	SB
2nd place, silver medalist(s)	Linden Hall	Australia	3:56.33	7	PB
3rd place, bronze medalist(s)	Nelly Chepchirchir	Kenya	3:57.35	6	
4	Laura Muir	Great Britain	3:57.63	5	SB
5	Agathe Guillemot	France	3:58.29	4	SB
6	Marta Pérez	Spain	3:59.13	3	
7	Esther Guerrero	Spain	3:59.45	2	PB
8	Marta Zenoni	Italy	4:00.00	1	
9	Susan Ejore	Kenya	4:00.18		
10	Heather MacLean	United States	4:00.54		
11	Axumawit Embaye	Ethiopia	4:09.41		
12	Sinclaire Johnson	United States	4:18.92		
—	Salomé Afonso	Portugal	DNF		
—	Freweyni Hailu	Ethiopia	DNF		
—	Lorea Ibarzabal	Spain	DNF		PM
—	Nel Vanopstal	Belgium	DNF		PM

400 metres hurdles
Place	Athlete	Nation	Time	Points	Notes
1st place, gold medalist(s)	Anna Cockrell	United States	53.66	8	
2nd place, silver medalist(s)	Gianna Woodruff	Panama	53.89	7	SB
3rd place, bronze medalist(s)	Naomi Van den Broeck	Belgium	54.12	6	NR
4	Andrenette Knight	Jamaica	54.40	5	
5	Amalie Iuel	Norway	54.87	4	
6	Ayomide Folorunso	Italy	55.35	3	
7	Kemi Adekoya	Bahrain	55.50	2	
8	Paulien Couckuyt	Belgium	55.73	1	

Triple jump
Place	Athlete	Nation	Distance	Points	Notes
1st place, gold medalist(s)	Leyanis Pérez	Cuba	14.78 m (±0.0 m/s)	8	
2nd place, silver medalist(s)	Davisleydi Velazco	Cuba	14.72 m (+0.4 m/s)	7	
3rd place, bronze medalist(s)	Jasmine Moore	United States	14.38 m (+0.2 m/s)	6	
4	Shanieka Ricketts	Jamaica	14.29 m (−0.1 m/s)	5	
5	Liadagmis Povea	Cuba	14.28 m (+0.1 m/s)	4	
6	Thea LaFond	Dominica	14.15 m (−0.4 m/s)	3	
7	Ackelia Smith	Jamaica	13.97 m (+0.2 m/s)	2	
8	Ilona Masson	Belgium	13.79 m (±0.0 m/s)	1	
9	Neja Filipič	Slovenia	13.75 m (−0.3 m/s)		

Shot put
Place	Athlete	Nation	Distance	Points	Notes
1st place, gold medalist(s)	Chase Jackson	United States	20.90 m	8	MR
2nd place, silver medalist(s)	Sarah Mitton	Canada	19.89 m	7	
3rd place, bronze medalist(s)	Jessica Schilder	Netherlands	19.58 m	6	
4	Yemisi Ogunleye	Germany	18.99 m	5	
5	Danniel Thomas-Dodd	Jamaica	18.92 m	4	
6	Fanny Roos	Sweden	18.80 m	3	
7	Maggie Ewen	United States	18.80 m	2	
8	Abby Moore	United States	18.58 m	1	
9	Jaida Moss	United States	18.22 m		

== See also ==
- 2025 Diamond League
