= 2025 Herculis =

Athletics meeting in Monaco

- Dates: 11 July 2025
- Host city: Monaco
- Venue: Stade Louis II
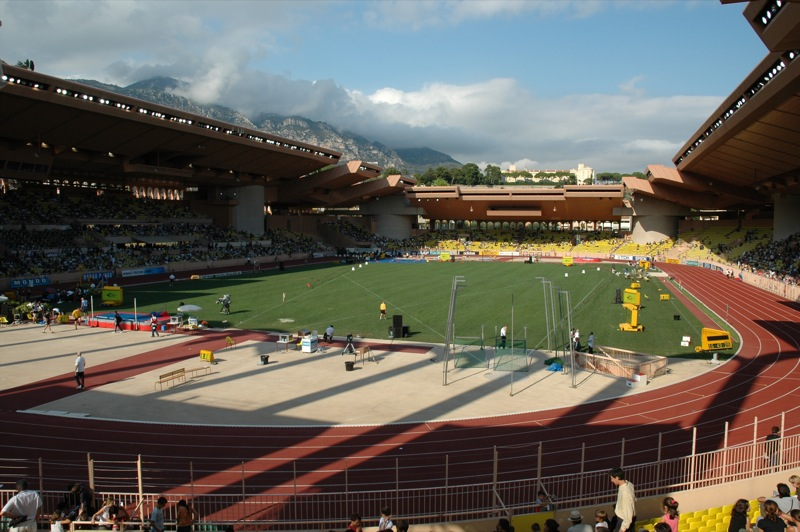
- Level: 2025 Diamond League

The 2025 Herculis was the 39th edition of the annual outdoor track and field meeting in Monaco. It was held on 11 July at Stade Louis II, it was the tenth leg of the 2025 Diamond League – the highest level international track and field circuit.

== Diamond+ events results ==
Starting in 2025 a new discipline of events was added called Diamond+, these 4 events per meet awarded athletes with increased prize money whilst keeping the standard points format to qualify for the Diamond league finals. First place earns 8 points, with each step down in place earning one less point than the previous, until no points are awarded in 9th place or lower. In the case of a tie, each tying athlete earns the full amount of points for the place.

=== Men's ===
200 metres
Place	Athlete	Nation	Time	Points	Notes
1st place, gold medalist(s)	Noah Lyles	United States	19.88	8	SB
2nd place, silver medalist(s)	Letsile Tebogo	Botswana	19.97	7	
3rd place, bronze medalist(s)	Makanakaishe Charamba	Zimbabwe	19.99	6	
4	Alexander Ogando	Dominican Republic	20.01	5	
5	Xavi Mo-Ajok	Netherlands	20.34 [.331]	4	
6	Jereem Richards	Trinidad and Tobago	20.34 [.332]	3	
7	Timothé Mumenthaler	Switzerland	20.40	2	
8	Téo Andant	France	20.69	1	PB
			Wind: (−0.8 m/s)		

Pole vault
Place	Athlete	Nation	Height	Points	Notes
1st place, gold medalist(s)	Armand Duplantis	Sweden	6.05 m	8	MR
2nd place, silver medalist(s)	Emmanouil Karalis	Greece	5.92 m	7	
3rd place, bronze medalist(s)	Kurtis Marschall	Australia	5.92 m	6	
4	Sam Kendricks	United States	5.82 m	5	SB
4	Renaud Lavillenie	France	5.82 m	5	=SB
6	Menno Vloon	Netherlands	5.72 m	3	
7	EJ Obiena	Philippines	5.72 m	2	
8	Ben Broeders	Belgium	5.62 m	1	
9	Thibaut Collet	France	5.62 m		
10	KC Lightfoot	United States	5.47 m		
—	Chris Nilsen	United States	NM		

=== Women's ===
100 metres hurdles
Place	Athlete	Nation	Time	Points	Notes
1st place, gold medalist(s)	Megan Tapper	Jamaica	12.34	8	=PB
2nd place, silver medalist(s)	Ditaji Kambundji	Switzerland	12.43	7	SB
3rd place, bronze medalist(s)	Nadine Visser	Netherlands	12.56	6	
4	Masai Russell	United States	12.57	5	
5	Grace Stark	United States	12.64	4	
6	Alia Armstrong	United States	12.68	3	
7	Devynne Charlton	Bahamas	12.69	2	
8	Giada Carmassi	Italy	12.82	1	
			Wind: (−1.1 m/s)		

400 metres hurdles
Place	Athlete	Nation	Time	Points	Notes
1st place, gold medalist(s)	Femke Bol	Netherlands	51.95	8	MR, WL
2nd place, silver medalist(s)	Dalilah Muhammad	United States	52.58	7	SB
3rd place, bronze medalist(s)	Anna Cockrell	United States	52.91	6	SB
4	Emma Zapletalová	Slovakia	54.51	5	
5	Andrenette Knight	Jamaica	54.54	4	
6	Ayomide Folorunso	Italy	55.08	3	
7	Zenéy Geldenhuys	South Africa	55.16	2	
8	Gianna Woodruff	Panama	59.21	1	

== Diamond events results ==
=== Men's ===
800 metres
Place	Athlete	Nation	Time	Points	Notes
1st place, gold medalist(s)	Emmanuel Wanyonyi	Kenya	1:41.44	8	MR, WL
2nd place, silver medalist(s)	Josh Hoey	United States	1:42.01	7	PB
3rd place, bronze medalist(s)	Djamel Sedjati	Algeria	1:42.20	6	SB
4	Peter Bol	Australia	1:42.55	5	AR
5	Marco Arop	Canada	1:42.73	4	SB
6	Slimane Moula	Algeria	1:42.86	3	
7	Bryce Hoppel	United States	1:43.51	2	
8	Tshepiso Masalela	Botswana	1:43.82	1	
9	Mohamed Attaoui	Spain	1:43.99		
10	Gabriel Tual	France	1:44.17		
11	Max Burgin	Great Britain	1:47.71		
—	Patryk Sieradzki	Poland	DNF		PM

5000 metres
Place	Athlete	Nation	Time	Points	Notes
1st place, gold medalist(s)	Yomif Kejelcha	Ethiopia	12:49.46	8	
2nd place, silver medalist(s)	Jimmy Gressier	France	12:53.36	7	
3rd place, bronze medalist(s)	Birhanu Balew	Bahrain	12:53.51	6	
4	Mohamed Abdilaahi	Germany	12:53.63	5	NR
5	Etienne Daguinos	France	12:55.76	4	PB
6	Dominic Lokinyomo Lobalu	Switzerland	12:56.42	3	
7	Hagos Gebrhiwet	Ethiopia	12:58.21	2	
8	Telahun Haile Bekele	Ethiopia	12:59.59	1	SB
9	Jacob Krop	Kenya	13:04.81		
10	Santiago Catrofe	Uruguay	13:05.52		
11	Mike Foppen	Netherlands	13:06.95		
12	Abdessamad Oukhelfen	Spain	13:30.94		SB
13	Fabien Palcau	France	13:36.36		
—	Andreas Almgren	Sweden	DNF		
—	Yann Schrub	France	DNF		
—	Mounir Akbache	France	DNF		PM
—	Ruben Verheyden	Belgium	DNF		PM

110 metres hurdles
Place	Athlete	Nation	Time	Points	Notes
1st place, gold medalist(s)	Trey Cunningham	United States	13.09	8	
2nd place, silver medalist(s)	Cordell Tinch	United States	13.14	7	
3rd place, bronze medalist(s)	Ja'Kobe Tharp	United States	13.17 [.164]	6	
4	Rachid Muratake	Japan	13.17 [.167]	5	
5	Dylan Beard	United States	13.17 [.170]	4	
6	Just Kwaou-Mathey	France	13.32	3	
7	Jason Joseph	Switzerland	17.32	2	
—	Wilhem Belocian	France	DQ		TR 16.8

3000 metres steeplechase
Place	Athlete	Nation	Time	Points	Notes
1st place, gold medalist(s)	Soufiane El Bakkali	Morocco	8:03.18	8	
2nd place, silver medalist(s)	Ryuji Miura	Japan	8:03.43	7	NR
3rd place, bronze medalist(s)	Edmund Serem	Kenya	8:04.00	6	PB
4	Salaheddine Ben Yazide	Morocco	8:06.44	5	PB
5	Getnet Wale	Ethiopia	8:07.57	4	SB
6	Samuel Firewu	Ethiopia	8:08.03	3	
7	Karl Bebendorf	Germany	8:08.21	2	PB
8	Mohamed Amin Jhinaoui	Tunisia	8:08.27	1	SB
9	Matthew Wilkinson	United States	8:10.23		PB
10	Daniel Arce	Spain	8:12.08		
11	James Corrigan	United States	8:14.76		SB
12	Abraham Kibiwot	Kenya	8:14.81		
13	Djilali Bedrani	France	8:16.34		
14	Frederik Ruppert	Germany	8:24.68		
15	Kenneth Rooks	United States	8:28.23		
16	Nicolas-Marie Daru	France	8:40.53		
—	Alexis Miellet	France	DNF		
—	Avinash Sable	India	DNF		
—	Faid El Mostafa	Morocco	DNF		PM
—	Mohamed Tindouft	Morocco	DNF		PM

High jump
Place	Athlete	Nation	Height	Points	Notes
1st place, gold medalist(s)	Woo Sang-hyeok	South Korea	2.34 m	8	=WL
2nd place, silver medalist(s)	Jan Štefela	Czech Republic	2.32 m	7	
3rd place, bronze medalist(s)	JuVaughn Harrison	United States	2.27 m	6	SB
4	Yonathan Kapitolnik	Israel	2.27 m	5	
5	Raymond Richards	Jamaica	2.23 m	4	
6	Hamish Kerr	New Zealand	2.23 m	3	
7	Romaine Beckford	Jamaica	2.23 m	2	
8	Shelby McEwen	United States	2.19 m	1	

Triple jump
Place	Athlete	Nation	Distance	Points	Notes
1st place, gold medalist(s)	Jordan Scott	Jamaica	17.52 m (+1.9 m/s)	8	PB
2nd place, silver medalist(s)	Yasser Triki	Algeria	17.23 m (+1.4 m/s)	7	SB
3rd place, bronze medalist(s)	Andy Díaz	Italy	17.19 m (+1.6 m/s)	6	SB
4	Hugues Fabrice Zango	Burkina Faso	17.09 m (+0.8 m/s)	5	
5	Thomas Gogois	France	16.75 m (+1.3 m/s)	4	
6	Endiorass Kingley	Austria	16.61 m (+1.6 m/s)	3	
7	Almir dos Santos	Brazil	16.43 m (+1.3 m/s)	2	
8	Max Heß	Germany	16.37 m (+1.4 m/s)	1	
9	Jean-Noël Crétinoir	France	15.21 m (+0.4 m/s)		

=== Women's ===
100 metres
Place	Athlete	Nation	Time	Points	Notes
1st place, gold medalist(s)	Julien Alfred	Saint Lucia	10.79	8	
2nd place, silver medalist(s)	Jacious Sears	United States	11.02	7	
3rd place, bronze medalist(s)	Zoe Hobbs	New Zealand	11.12	6	
4	Aleia Hobbs	United States	11.14	5	
5	Thelma Davies	Liberia	11.16	4	
6	Amy Hunt	Great Britain	11.17	3	
7	Maia McCoy	United States	11.19	2	
8	Boglárka Takács	Hungary	11.26	1	
			Wind: (−1.4 m/s)		

400 metres
Place	Athlete	Nation	Time	Points	Notes
1st place, gold medalist(s)	Marileidy Paulino	Dominican Republic	49.06	8	
2nd place, silver medalist(s)	Aaliyah Butler	United States	49.09	7	PB
3rd place, bronze medalist(s)	Nickisha Pryce	Jamaica	49.63	6	SB
4	Natalia Bukowiecka	Poland	49.72	5	SB
5	Lieke Klaver	Netherlands	50.23	4	SB
6	Martina Weil	Chile	50.30	3	
7	Yemi Mary John	Great Britain	51.10	2	
8	Amandine Brossier	France	52.73	1	

1000 metres
Place	Athlete	Nation	Time	Points	Notes
1st place, gold medalist(s)	Nelly Chepchirchir	Kenya	2:29.77	8	PB
2nd place, silver medalist(s)	Addison Wiley	United States	2:30.71	7	AR
3rd place, bronze medalist(s)	Jessica Hull	Australia	2:30.96	6	AR
4	Sinclaire Johnson	United States	2:31.30	5	PB
5	Jemma Reekie	Great Britain	2:31.44	4	SB
6	Halimah Nakaayi	Uganda	2:31.67	3	NR
7	Sarah Billings	Australia	2:33.17	2	PB
8	Anaïs Bourgoin	France	2:33.36	1	PB
9	Agathe Guillemot	France	2:34.75		PB
10	Audrey Werro	Switzerland	2:34.88		PB
11	Clara Liberman	France	2:35.21		PB
12	Mary Moraa	Kenya	2:48.67		SB
—	Tess Kirsopp-Cole	Australia	DNF		PM

Shot put
Place	Athlete	Nation	Distance	Points	Notes
1st place, gold medalist(s)	Jessica Schilder	Netherlands	20.39 m	8	
2nd place, silver medalist(s)	Chase Jackson	United States	20.06 m	7	
3rd place, bronze medalist(s)	Sarah Mitton	Canada	20.00 m	6	
4	Yemisi Ogunleye	Germany	19.48 m	5	
5	Fanny Roos	Sweden	19.16 m	4	
6	Maggie Ewen	United States	18.98 m	3	
7	Jaida Ross	United States	18.83 m	2	

== See also ==
- 2025 Diamond League
