= Faid El Mostafa =

Moroccan steeplechase runner (born 2000)

Personal information
- Born: 13 January 2000 (age 26)

Sport
- Sport: Athletics
- Event: 3000 m steeplechase

Achievements and titles
- Personal bests: 3000m s'chase: 8:14.04 (Stockholm, 2025)

Faid El Mostafa (born 13 January 2000) is a Moroccan steeplechaser. He competed at the 2024 Olympic Games and became Moroccan national champion in 2024 in the 3000 metres steeplechase.

== Biography ==
He won the 3000 metres steeplechase at the Moroccan Athletics Championships on 29 June 2024, running 8:23.24. He was selected to compete in the 3000 metres steeplechase at the 2024 Olympic Games in Paris, France. He ran a time of 8:39.48 but did not progress through to the final from his preliminary heat.

He competed at the 2025 Diamond League event at the 2025 Meeting International Mohammed VI d'Athlétisme de Rabat in Rabat in May 2025, running 8:22.78. He ran a personal best time of 8:14.04 in the 3000 metres steeplechase at the 2025 Diamond League event in 2025 BAUHAUS-galan event in Stockholm in June 2025. That month, he also competed at the 2025 Meeting de Paris. In September 2025, he competed in the 3000 metres steeplechase at the 2025 World Championships in Tokyo, Japan.

In May 2026, he placed ninth in the 3000 metres steeplechase at the 2026 Meeting International Mohammed VI d'Athlétisme de Rabat, part of the 2026 Diamond League.
