= Elijah Kosiba =

American high jumper (born 2002)

Elijah Mattix Kosiba
Personal information
- Nationality: American
- Born: April 3, 2002 (age 24)

Sport
- Sport: Track and field
- Event: High jump

Achievements and titles
- Personal bests: 2.30 (Allendale, 2024)

Elijah Mattix Kosiba (born 3 April 2002) is an American high jumper. He is the reigning American indoor champion having won the title at the 2026 USA Indoor Track and Field Championships.

== Early life ==
He attended Rensselaer Central High School in Indiana and Grand Valley State University, Michigan.

== Career ==
He finished fourth at the US Track and Field Championships in 2023. He competed at the 2023 Pan American Games in Santiago.

Competing in Allendale, Michigan, in December 2024, he tied the NCAA DII men's indoor high jump record set in 2007, with a personal best 2.30 metres clearance.

He was runner-up at the 2025 USA Indoor Track and Field Championships in New York, on 23 February 2025. He was selected for the 2025 World Athletics Indoor Championships in Nanjing in March 2025, where he finished in fourth place overall on countback as one of four athletes who cleared 2.28 metres, including silver and bronze medalists Hamish Kerr and Ratmond Richards. He placed seventh at the 2025 Memorial Van Damme in the 2025 Diamond League, in Brussels, Belgium, in August 2025.

On 1 March 2026, he won the 2026 USA Indoor Track and Field Championships, clearing 2.24 metres on the day.
