= 2025 Meeting International Mohammed VI d'Athlétisme de Rabat =

Athletics meeting in Rabat, Morocco

- Dates: 25 May 2025
- Host city: Rabat, Morocco
- Venue: Rabat Olympic Stadium
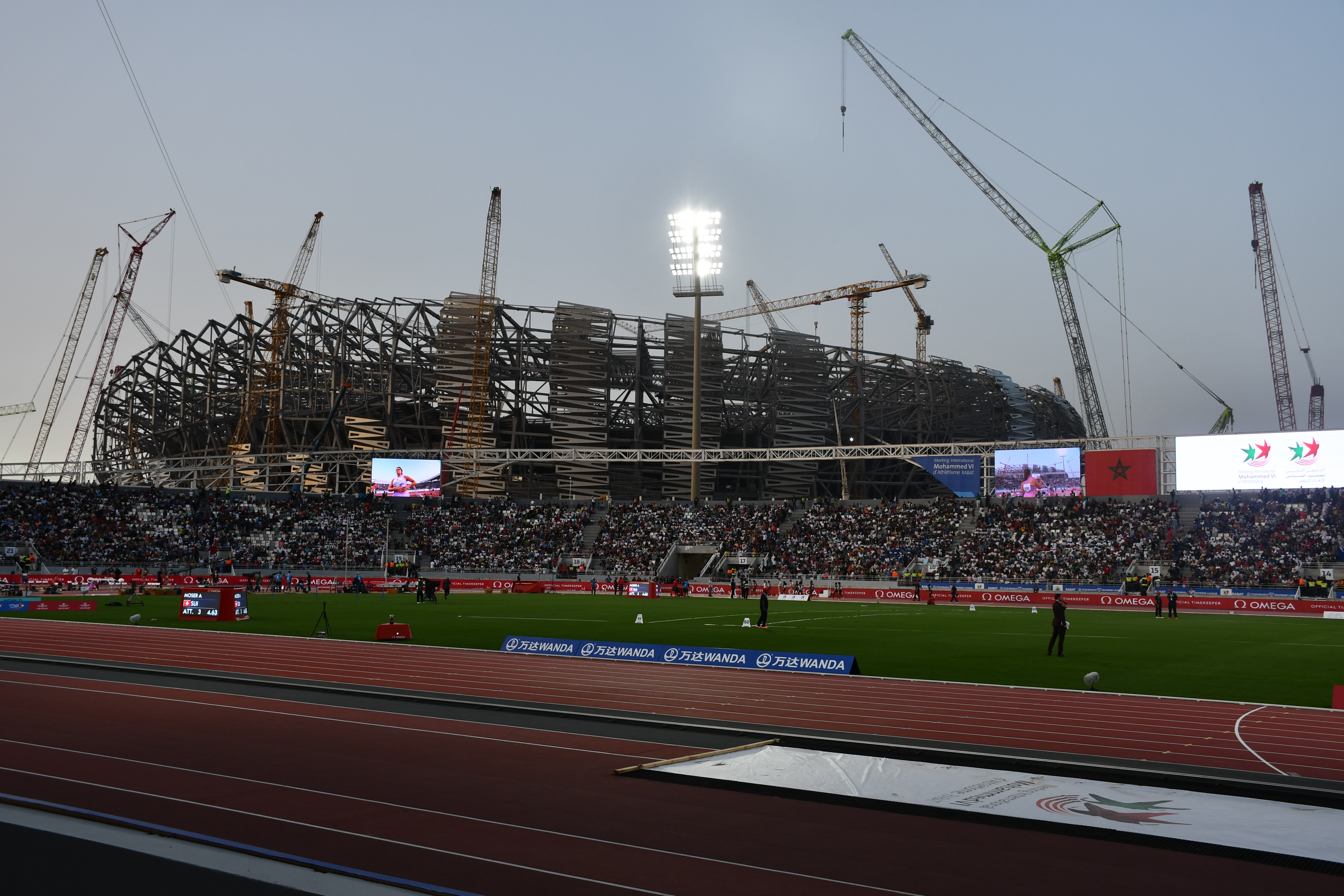
- Level: 2025 Diamond League

The 2025 Meeting International Mohammed VI d'Athlétisme de Rabat was the 16th edition of the annual outdoor track and field meeting in Rabat, Morocco. Held on 25 May at the Rabat Olympic Stadium, it was the fourth leg of the 2025 Diamond League – the highest level international track and field circuit.

== Diamond+ events results ==
Starting in 2025 a new discipline of events was added called Diamond+, these 4 events per meet awarded athletes with increased prize money whilst keeping the standard points format to qualify for the Diamond league finals. First place earns 8 points, with each step down in place earning one less point than the previous, until no points are awarded in 9th place or lower. In the case of a tie, each tying athlete earns the full amount of points for the place.

=== Men's ===
200 metres
Place	Athlete	Nation	Time	Points	Notes
1st place, gold medalist(s)	Courtney Lindsey	United States	20.04	8	SB
2nd place, silver medalist(s)	Joseph Fahnbulleh	Liberia	20.12	7	
3rd place, bronze medalist(s)	Robert Gregory	United States	20.26 [.258]	5	
4	Wayde van Niekerk	South Africa	20.26 [.258]	4	SB
5	Kyree King	United States	20.28	3	SB
6	Benjamin Richardson	South Africa	20.49	2	
7	Ryan Zeze	France	20.68	1	
	Fred Kerley	United States	~~20.16~~	~~6~~	DSQ
			Wind: (+0.4 m/s)		

Shot put
Place	Athlete	Nation	Distance	Points	Notes
1st place, gold medalist(s)	Payton Otterdahl	United States	21.97 m	8	WL
2nd place, silver medalist(s)	Rajindra Campbell	Jamaica	21.95 m	7	SB
3rd place, bronze medalist(s)	Joe Kovacs	United States	21.52 m	6	SB
4	Adrian Piperi	United States	21.47 m	5	
5	Jordan Geist	United States	21.42 m	4	
6	Tom Walsh	New Zealand	21.41 m	3	
7	Chukwuebuka Enekwechi	Nigeria	21.38 m	2	
8	Leonardo Fabbri	Italy	21.03 m	1	
9	Roger Steen	United States	20.83 m		
10	Andrei Toader	Romania	20.19 m		
11	Zane Weir	Italy	20.11 m		
12	Wictor Petersson	Sweden	19.89 m		

=== Women's ===
100 metres
Place	Athlete	Nation	Time	Points	Notes
1st place, gold medalist(s)	Shericka Jackson	Jamaica	11.04	8	SB
2nd place, silver medalist(s)	Maia McCoy	Liberia	11.08	7	
3rd place, bronze medalist(s)	Jacious Sears	United States	11.11	6	SB
4	Celera Barnes	United States	11.16 [.156]	5	
5	Zoe Hobbs	New Zealand	11.16 [.157]	4	
6	Cambrea Sturgis	United States	11.27	3	
7	Rani Rosius	Belgium	11.29	2	SB
8	Deajah Stevens	United States	11.31	1	SB
9	Bree Masters	Australia	11.43		
			Wind: (+0.2 m/s)		

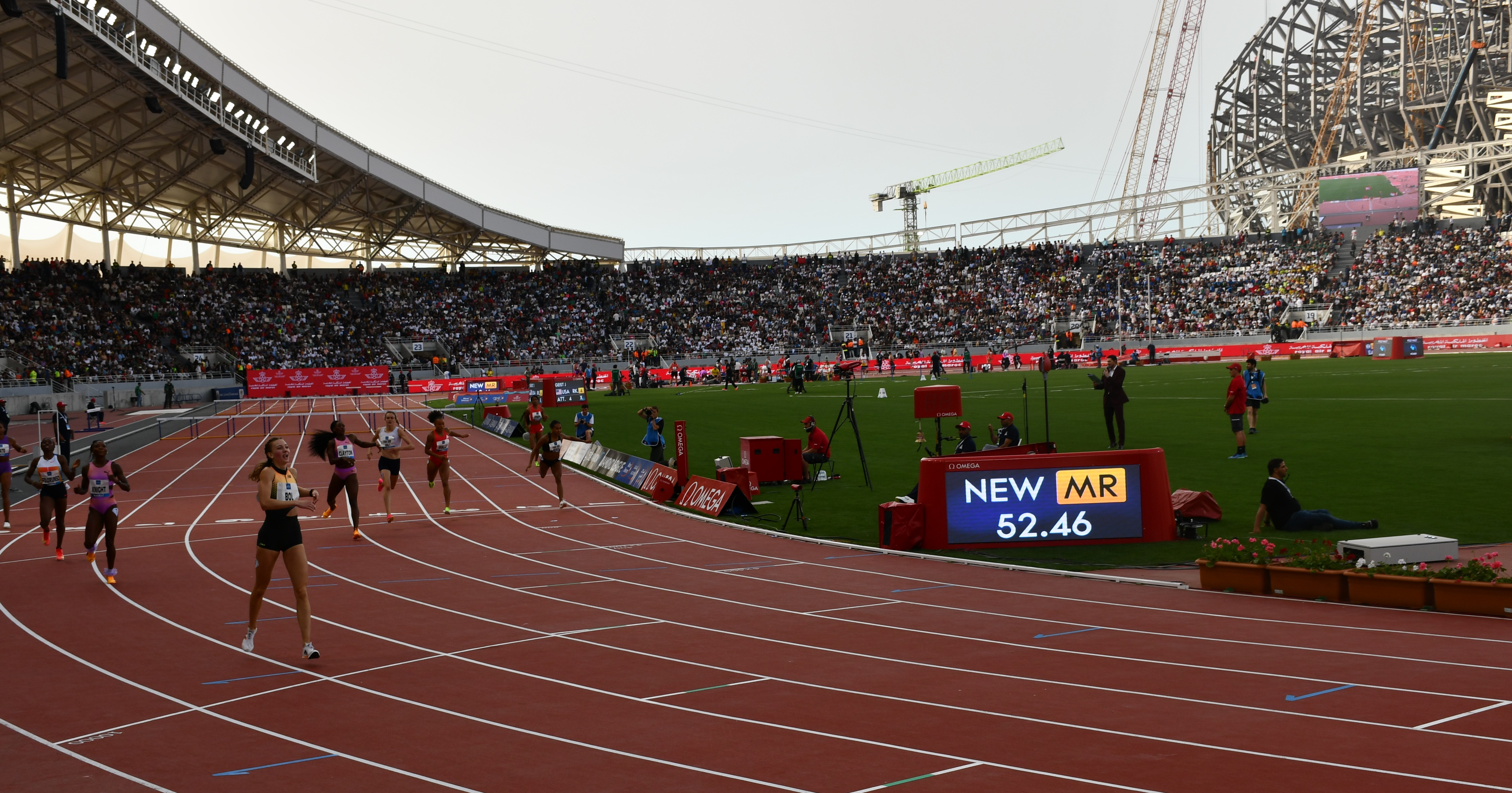
Bol winning the race with new meeting record.

400 metres hurdles
Place	Athlete	Nation	Time	Points	Notes
1st place, gold medalist(s)	Femke Bol	Netherlands	52.46	8	MR, SB
2nd place, silver medalist(s)	Andrenette Knight	Jamaica	53.90	7	SB
3rd place, bronze medalist(s)	Ayomide Folorunso	Italy	54.74	6	SB
4	Rushell Clayton	Jamaica	54.83	5	SB
5	Zenéy Geldenhuys	South Africa	55.37	4	
6	Fatoumata Diallo	Portugal	55.54	3	
7	Naomi Van den Broeck	Belgium	55.69	2	SB
8	Cassandra Tate	United States	56.06	1	
9	Rogail Joseph	South Africa	57.91		SB

== Diamond events results ==
=== Men's ===
100 metres
Place	Athlete	Nation	Time	Points	Notes
1st place, gold medalist(s)	Akani Simbine	South Africa	9.95	8	
2nd place, silver medalist(s)	Ferdinand Omanyala	Kenya	10.05	7	
3rd place, bronze medalist(s)	Emmanuel Eseme	Cameroon	10.10	5	
4	Brandon Hicklin	United States	10.11	4	
5	Shaun Maswanganyi	South Africa	10.19	3	SB
6	Jeff Erius	France	10.25	2	SB
7	Kyree King	United States	10.28	1	
8	Letsile Tebogo	Botswana	10.43		
	Fred Kerley	United States	~~10.07~~	~~6~~	DSQ
			Wind: (+0.6 m/s)		

400 metres
Place	Athlete	Nation	Time	Points	Notes
1st place, gold medalist(s)	Jacory Patterson	United States	44.37	8	
2nd place, silver medalist(s)	Zakithi Nene	South Africa	44.46	7	
3rd place, bronze medalist(s)	Quincy Hall	United States	44.90	6	SB
4	Bryce Deadmon	United States	44.97	5	
5	Christopher Morales Williams	Canada	45.16	4	SB
6	Johnnie Blockburger	United States	45.55	3	
7	Leungo Scotch	Botswana	45.89	2	
8	Walid El Boussiri	Morocco	46.47	1	
—	Bayapo Ndori	Botswana	DNF		

800 metres
Place	Athlete	Nation	Time	Points	Notes
1st place, gold medalist(s)	Tshepiso Masalela	Botswana	1:42.70	8	MR, WL, PB
2nd place, silver medalist(s)	Max Burgin	Great Britain	1:43.34	7	PB
3rd place, bronze medalist(s)	Emmanuel Wanyonyi	Kenya	1:43.37	6	SB
4	Brandon Miller	United States	1:43.52	5	PB
5	Kethobogile Haingura	Botswana	1:43.82	4	
6	Wyclife Kinyamal	Kenya	1:44.63	3	
7	Abderrahman El Assal	Morocco	1:44.70	2	PB
8	Yanis Meziane	France	1:44.95	1	SB
9	Pieter Sisk	Belgium	1:45.10		SB
10	Abdelati El Guesse	Morocco	1:45.48		
11	Andreas Kramer	Sweden	1:45.63		
12	Aaron Cheminingwa	Kenya	1:47.27		
—	Patryk Sieradzki	Poland	DNF		PM

1500 metres
Place	Athlete	Nation	Time	Points	Notes
1st place, gold medalist(s)	Jonah Koech	United States	3:31.43	8	MR, PB
2nd place, silver medalist(s)	Reynold Cheruiyot	Kenya	3:31.78	7	SB
3rd place, bronze medalist(s)	Festus Lagat	Kenya	3:32.06	6	PB
4	Azeddine Habz	France	3:32.25	5	
5	Anass Essayi	Morocco	3:32.88	4	SB
6	Vincent Ciattei	United States	3:32.94	3	SB
7	Ruben Verheyden	Belgium	3:33.19	2	PB
8	Cathal Doyle	Ireland	3:33.32	1	SB
9	Vincent Kibet Keter	Kenya	3:33.33		SB
10	Jude Thomas	Australia	3:33.35		PB
11	Brian Komen	Kenya	3:34.38		SB
12	Elhassane Moujahid	Morocco	3:35.38		PB
13	Sam Tanner	New Zealand	3:35.48		SB
14	Romain Mornet	France	3:35.59		SB
15	Tshepo Tshite	South Africa	3:36.22		
16	Hafid Rizqy	Morocco	3:36.67		SB
17	Abdelatif Sadiki	Morocco	3:42.91		SB
—	Abraham Alvarado	United States	DNF		PM
—	Boaz Kiprugut	Kenya	DNF		PM

3000 metres steeplechase
Place	Athlete	Nation	Time	Points	Notes
1st place, gold medalist(s)	Soufiane El Bakkali	Morocco	8:00.70	8	WL
2nd place, silver medalist(s)	Frederik Ruppert	Germany	8:01.49	7	NR
3rd place, bronze medalist(s)	Edmund Serem	Kenya	8:07.47	6	PB
4	Samuel Firewu	Ethiopia	8:09.98	5	
5	Daniel Arce	Spain	8:10.58	4	SB
6	Mohamed Amin Jhinaoui	Tunisia	8:10.59	3	
7	Matthew Wilkinson	United States	8:11.11	2	PB
8	Salaheddine Ben Yazide	Morocco	8:11.40	1	PB
9	Djilali Bedrani	France	8:11.52		SB
10	Hailemariyam Amare	Ethiopia	8:11.80		
11	Alexis Miellet	France	8:12.89		PB
12	Abraham Kibiwot	Kenya	8:13.20		
13	Ryuji Miura	Japan	8:13.39		
14	Luc Le Baron	France	8:13.70		PB
15	Ahmed Jaziri	Tunisia	8:18.00		SB
16	Abrham Sime	Ethiopia	8:20.97		
17	Faid El Mostafa	Morocco	8:22.78		SB
18	Fredrik Sandvik	Norway	8:39.00		SB
—	Mohamed Tindouft	Morocco	DNF		
—	Wilberforce Kones	Kenya	DNF		PM
—	Abderrafia Bouassel	Morocco	DNF		PM

High jump
Place	Athlete	Nation	Height	Points	Notes
1st place, gold medalist(s)	Hamish Kerr	New Zealand	2.25 m	8	
2nd place, silver medalist(s)	Marco Fassinotti	Italy	2.25 m	7	SB
2nd place, silver medalist(s)	Yual Reath	Australia	2.25 m	7	SB
4	JuVaughn Harrison	United States	2.25 m	5	SB
5	Romaine Beckford	Jamaica	2.21 m	4	=SB
5	Shelby McEwen	United States	2.21 m	4	
7	Donald Thomas	Bahamas	2.21 m	2	
8	Matteo Sioli	Italy	2.21 m	1	
9	Raymond Richards	Jamaica	2.21 m		
10	Jan Štefela	Czech Republic	2.16 m		
11	Saad Hammouda	Morocco	2.16 m		SB
11	Vernon Turner	United States	2.16 m		

=== Women's ===
800 metres
Place	Athlete	Nation	Time	Points	Notes
1st place, gold medalist(s)	Tsige Duguma	Ethiopia	1:57.42	8	
2nd place, silver medalist(s)	Prudence Sekgodiso	South Africa	1:57.52	7	SB
3rd place, bronze medalist(s)	Addison Wiley	United States	1:57.55	6	SB
4	Anaïs Bourgoin	France	1:57.81	5	PB
5	Shafiqua Maloney	Saint Vincent and the Grenadines	1:58.00	4	SB
6	Assia Raziki	Morocco	1:58.49	3	SB
7	Halimah Nakaayi	Uganda	1:58.58	2	
8	Eloisa Coiro	Italy	1:58.64	1	PB
9	Audrey Werro	Switzerland	1:58.97		SB
10	Natoya Goule-Toppin	Jamaica	1:59.92		
11	Soukaina Hajji	Morocco	2:00.07		PB
12	Noélie Yarigo	Benin	2:04.43		
—	Margarita Koczanowa	Poland	DNF		PM

3000 metres
Place	Athlete	Nation	Time	Points	Notes
1st place, gold medalist(s)	Beatrice Chebet	Kenya	8:11.56	8	AR, DLR
2nd place, silver medalist(s)	Nadia Battocletti	Italy	8:26.27	7	NR
3rd place, bronze medalist(s)	Sarah Healy	Ireland	8:27.02	6	PB
4	Ejgayehu Taye	Ethiopia	8:29.55	5	
5	Yenenesh Shimeket	Ethiopia	8:32.01	4	PB
6	Marta Alemayo	Ethiopia	8:32.20	3	PB
7	Aleshign Baweke	Ethiopia	8:32.88	2	PB
8	Maureen Koster	Netherlands	8:34.98	1	
9	Diane van Es	Netherlands	8:38.12		PB
10	Janeth Chepngetich	Kenya	8:38.83		
11	Asmarech Anley	Ethiopia	8:42.41		PB
12	Mekedes Alemeshete	Ethiopia	8:47.85		
13	Lemlem Hailu	Ethiopia	8:56.57		SB
14	Shito Gumi	Ethiopia	9:01.68		
15	Ayal Dagnachew	Ethiopia	9:12.11		
—	Georgia Griffith	Australia	DNF		PM
—	Eleanor Fulton	United States	DNF		PM
—	Winnie Nanyondo	Uganda	DNF		PM

Pole vault
Place	Athlete	Nation	Height	Points	Notes
1st place, gold medalist(s)	Katie Moon	United States	4.73 m	8	
2nd place, silver medalist(s)	Tina Šutej	Slovenia	4.63 m	7	
3rd place, bronze medalist(s)	Gabriela Leon	United States	4.63 m	6	
4	Imogen Ayris	New Zealand	4.50 m	5	
5	Roberta Bruni	Italy	4.50 m	4	
6	Angelica Moser	Switzerland	4.50 m	3	
7	Emily Grove	United States	4.50 m	2	
8	Marie-Julie Bonnin	France	4.35 m	1	
9	Olivia McTaggart	New Zealand	4.35 m		
10	Alysha Newman	Canada	4.20 m		

Javelin throw
Place	Athlete	Nation	Distance	Points	Notes
1st place, gold medalist(s)	Elina Tzengko	Greece	64.60 m	8	
2nd place, silver medalist(s)	Adriana Vilagoš	Serbia	63.25 m	7	
3rd place, bronze medalist(s)	Anete Sietiņa	Latvia	60.19 m	6	SB
4	Flor Ruiz	Colombia	59.67 m	5	SB
5	Jo-Ané du Plessis	South Africa	59.25 m	4	
6	Maria Andrejczyk	Poland	57.26 m	3	
7	Mackenzie Little	Australia	56.90 m	2	
8	Yulenmis Aguilar	Spain	56.37 m	1	
9	Victoria Hudson	Austria	54.60 m		

== Promotional events results ==
=== Women's ===
1500 metres
Place	Athlete	Nation	Time	Notes
1st place, gold medalist(s)	Nelly Chepchirchir	Kenya	3:58.04	SB
2nd place, silver medalist(s)	Worknesh Mesele	Ethiopia	3:58.44	SB
3rd place, bronze medalist(s)	Dorcus Ewoi	Kenya	3:59.25	PB
4	Saron Berhe	Ethiopia	3:59.93	SB
5	Axumawit Embaye	Ethiopia	4:01.46	SB
6	Netsanet Desta	Ethiopia	4:02.25	SB
7	Sarah Billings	Australia	4:02.93	SB
8	Lucia Stafford	Canada	4:03.54	SB
9	Nelly Jepkosgei	Bahrain	4:04.01	SB
10	Águeda Marqués	Spain	4:04.35	SB
11	Bérénice Cleyet-Merle	France	4:04.87	SB
12	Hawi Abera	Ethiopia	4:04.92	PB
13	Tigist Girma	Ethiopia	4:05.30	SB
14	Lore Hoffmann	Switzerland	4:05.77	PB
15	Bayise Tolesa	Ethiopia	4:06.40	PB
16	Nigist Getachew	Ethiopia	4:06.76	SB
—	Esther Guerrero	Spain	DNF	PM

100 metres hurdles
Place	Athlete	Nation	Time	Notes
1st place, gold medalist(s)	Tobi Amusan	Nigeria	12.45	MR, SB
2nd place, silver medalist(s)	Nadine Visser	Netherlands	12.67	SB
3rd place, bronze medalist(s)	Pia Skrzyszowska	Poland	12.69	SB
4	Ditaji Kambundji	Switzerland	12.71	SB
5	Giada Carmassi	Italy	12.81	PB
6	Elena Carraro	Italy	12.89	
7	Destiny Huven	United States	12.93	
8	Sacha Alessandrini	France	12.96	SB
9	Karin Strametz	Austria	13.08	SB
			Wind: (+1.2 m/s)	

== See also ==
- 2025 Diamond League
