= 2025 Meeting de Paris =

Athletics meeting in Paris, France

- Dates: 20 June 2025
- Host city: Paris, France
- Venue: Stade Sébastien Charléty
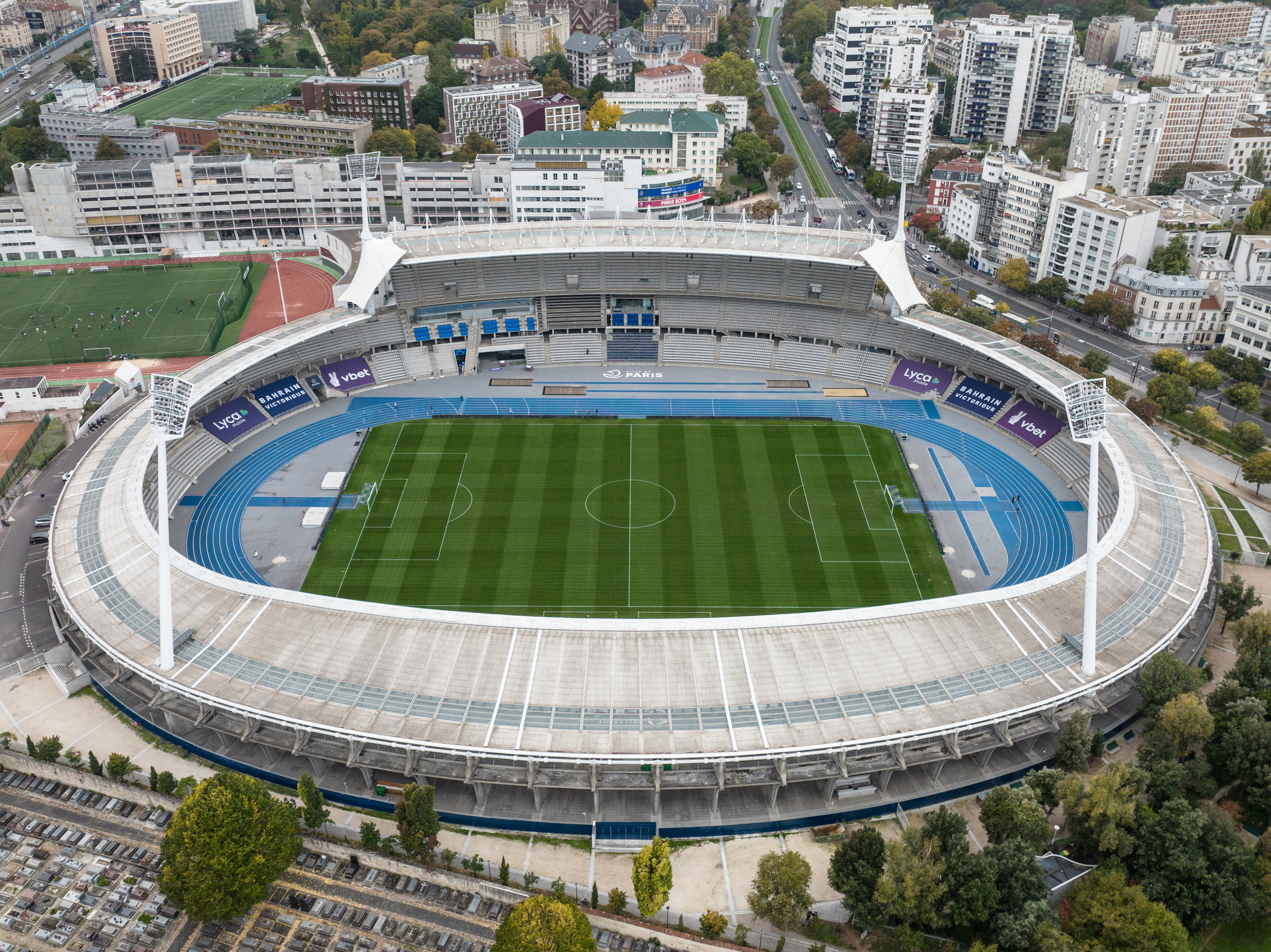
- Level: 2025 Diamond League

The 2025 Meeting de Paris was the 30th edition of the annual outdoor track and field meeting in Paris, France. Held on 20 June at the Stade Sébastien Charléty, it was the eighth leg of the 2025 Diamond League – the highest level international track and field circuit.

== Diamond+ events results ==
Starting in 2025 a new discipline of events was added called Diamond+, these 4 events per meet awarded athletes with increased prize money whilst keeping the standard points format to qualify for the Diamond league finals. First place earns 8 points, with each step down in place earning one less point than the previous, until no points are awarded in 9th place or lower. In the case of a tie, each tying athlete earns the full amount of points for the place.

=== Men's ===
110 metres hurdles - Heats
Rank	Athlete	Nation	Time	Notes
Heat 1
1	Rachid Muratake	Japan	13.08 [.072]	Q, SB
2	Dylan Beard	United States	13.08 [.075]	Q, PB
3	Trey Cunningham	United States	13.10	Q
4	Jamal Britt	United States	13.12	q
5	Just Kwaou-Mathey	France	13.15	q, SB
6	Asier Martínez	Spain	13.34	
7	Eric Edwards Jr.	United States	13.35	SB
8	Aurel Manga	France	13.37	
			Wind: (+1.4 m/s)	
Heat 2
1	Jason Joseph	Switzerland	13.09	Q, SB
2	Grant Holloway	United States	13.16 [.151]	Q, SB
3	Enrique Llopis	Spain	13.16 [.157]	Q, SB
4	Wilhem Belocian	France	13.20	SB
5	Freddie Crittenden	United States	13.30	
6	Jérémie Lararaudeuse	Mauritius	13.37	
7	Erwann Cinna	France	13.40	
—	Michael Obasuyi	Belgium	DNF	
			Wind: (+1.1 m/s)	

110 metres hurdles
Place	Athlete	Nation	Time	Points	Notes
1st place, gold medalist(s)	Trey Cunningham	United States	13.00	8	=PB
2nd place, silver medalist(s)	Dylan Beard	United States	13.02	7	PB
3rd place, bronze medalist(s)	Jason Joseph	Switzerland	13.07	6	=NR
4	Rachid Muratake	Japan	13.08	5	=SB
5	Grant Holloway	United States	13.11	4	SB
6	Jamal Britt	United States	13.15	3	
7	Just Kwaou-Mathey	France	13.24	2	
8	Enrique Llopis	Spain	13.32	1	
			Wind: (+1.1 m/s)		

400 metres hurdles
Place	Athlete	Nation	Time	Points	Notes
1st place, gold medalist(s)	Rai Benjamin	United States	46.93	8	MR
2nd place, silver medalist(s)	Abderrahman Samba	Qatar	47.09	7	SB
3rd place, bronze medalist(s)	Trevor Bassitt	United States	48.14	6	SB
4	Matheus Lima	Brazil	48.26	5	
5	Alastair Chalmers	Great Britain	48.57	4	
6	Fantin Crisci	France	49.40	3	PB
7	Hugo Menin	France	51.42	2	

=== Women's ===
100 metres hurdles
Place	Athlete	Nation	Time	Points	Notes
1st place, gold medalist(s)	Grace Stark	United States	12.21	8	MR, PB
2nd place, silver medalist(s)	Tobi Amusan	Nigeria	12.24	7	SB
3rd place, bronze medalist(s)	Ackera Nugent	Jamaica	12.30	6	SB
4	Kendra Harrison	United States	12.48	5	
5	Nadine Visser	Netherlands	12.51	4	
6	Devynne Charlton	Bahamas	12.53	3	SB
7	Alaysha Johnson	United States	12.66	2	
8	Pia Skrzyszowska	Poland	12.67	1	SB
			Wind: (+0.7 m/s)		

Pole vault
Place	Athlete	Nation	Height	Points	Notes
1st place, gold medalist(s)	Katie Moon	United States	4.73 m	8	
2nd place, silver medalist(s)	Sandi Morris	United States	4.73 m	7	
3rd place, bronze medalist(s)	Emily Grove	United States	4.63 m	6	
4	Angelica Moser	Switzerland	4.63 m	5	
5	Amálie Švábíková	Czech Republic	4.63 m	4	
6	Marie-Julie Bonnin	France	4.53 m	3	
6	Tina Šutej	Slovenia	4.53 m	3	
8	Gabriela Leon	United States	4.43 m	1	
9	Imogen Ayris	New Zealand	4.43 m		
10	Olivia McTaggart	New Zealand	4.43 m		
11	Bérénice Petit	France	4.28 m		
—	Roberta Bruni	Italy	NM		
—	Margot Chevrier	France	NM		

== Diamond events results ==
=== Men's ===
800 metres
Place	Athlete	Nation	Time	Points	Notes
1st place, gold medalist(s)	Mohamed Attaoui	Spain	1:42.73	8	SB
2nd place, silver medalist(s)	Josh Hoey	United States	1:43.00	7	
3rd place, bronze medalist(s)	Bryce Hoppel	United States	1:43.11	6	SB
4	Max Burgin	Great Britain	1:43.61	5	
5	Gabriel Tual	France	1:43.84	4	
6	Mark English	Ireland	1:43.98	3	
7	Andreas Kramer	Sweden	1:44.02	2	
8	Tshepiso Masalela	Botswana	1:44.16	1	
9	Slimane Moula	Algeria	1:44.46		
10	Yanis Meziane	France	1:44.55		
11	Wyclife Kinyamal	Kenya	1:44.85		
12	Nicholas Kebenei	Kenya	1:45.03		
—	Patryk Sieradzki	Poland	DNF		PM

5000 metres
Place	Athlete	Nation	Time	Points	Notes
1st place, gold medalist(s)	Yomif Kejelcha	Ethiopia	12:47.84	8	SB
2nd place, silver medalist(s)	Birhanu Balew	Bahrain	12:48.67	7	AR
3rd place, bronze medalist(s)	Graham Blanks	United States	12:49.51	6	
4	Jimmy Gressier	France	12:51.59	5	NR
5	Samuel Tefera	Ethiopia	12:53.44	4	PB
6	Soufiane El Bakkali	Morocco	12:55.49	3	PB
7	Nico Young	United States	12:55.71	2	
8	Yann Schrub	France	12:56.57	1	PB
9	Etienne Daguinos	France	12:57.49		PB
10	Santiago Catrofe	Uruguay	12:59.26		AR
11	Mezgebu Sime	Ethiopia	13:04.51		
12	Jacob Krop	Kenya	13:05.04		
13	Gemechu Dida	Ethiopia	13:05.89		SB
14	Adriaan Wildschutt	South Africa	13:28.67		
15	Valentin Gondouin	France	13:29.79		SB
—	Addisu Yihune	Ethiopia	DNF		
—	Boaz Kiprugut	Kenya	DNF		PM
—	Jude Thomas	Australia	DNF		PM

Triple jump
Place	Athlete	Nation	Distance	Points	Notes
1st place, gold medalist(s)	Jordan Scott	Jamaica	17.27 m (+0.5 m/s)	8	
2nd place, silver medalist(s)	Hugues Fabrice Zango	Burkina Faso	17.21 m (+1.8 m/s)	7	SB
3rd place, bronze medalist(s)	Thomas Gogois	France	17.11 m (+1.3 m/s)	6	SB
4	Jonathan Seremes	France	17.08 m (+0.9 m/s)	5	PB
5	Yasser Triki	Algeria	17.02 m (+2.1 m/s)	4	
6	Max Heß	Germany	16.85 m (±0.0 m/s)	3	
7	Donald Scott	United States	16.84 m (−0.4 m/s)	2	
8	Lázaro Martínez	Cuba	16.40 m (+0.8 m/s)	1	
9	Melvin Raffin	France	14.80 m (+1.1 m/s)		
—	Almir dos Santos	Brazil	NM		

Javelin throw
Place	Athlete	Nation	Distance	Points	Notes
1st place, gold medalist(s)	Neeraj Chopra	India	88.16 m	8	
2nd place, silver medalist(s)	Julian Weber	Germany	87.88 m	7	
3rd place, bronze medalist(s)	Luiz Maurício da Silva	Brazil	86.62 m	6	AR
4	Keshorn Walcott	Trinidad and Tobago	81.66 m	5	
5	Anderson Peters	Grenada	80.29 m	4	
6	Julius Yego	Kenya	80.26 m	3	
7	Andrian Mardare	Moldova	76.66 m	2	
8	Remi Rougetet	France	70.37 m	1	

=== Women's ===
200 metres
Place	Athlete	Nation	Time	Points	Notes
1st place, gold medalist(s)	Anavia Battle	United States	22.27	8	SB
2nd place, silver medalist(s)	Amy Hunt	Great Britain	22.45	7	SB
3rd place, bronze medalist(s)	McKenzie Long	United States	22.49	6	SB
4	Deajah Stevens	United States	22.66	5	
5	Brittany Brown	United States	22.77	4	
6	Dina Asher-Smith	Great Britain	22.81	3	
7	Audrey Leduc	Canada	22.90	2	
8	Hélène Parisot	France	22.92	1	
			Wind: (+0.9 m/s)		

400 metres
Place	Athlete	Nation	Time	Points	Notes
1st place, gold medalist(s)	Marileidy Paulino	Dominican Republic	48.81	8	MR, SB
2nd place, silver medalist(s)	Salwa Eid Naser	Bahrain	48.85	7	
3rd place, bronze medalist(s)	Martina Weil	Chile	49.83	6	NR
4	Lynna Irby-Jackson	United States	49.87	5	SB
5	Amber Anning	Great Britain	49.96	4	SB
6	Isabella Whittaker	United States	50.18	3	
7	Lieke Klaver	Netherlands	50.26	2	SB
8	Amandine Brossier	France	52.10	1	

1500 metres
Place	Athlete	Nation	Time	Points	Notes
1st place, gold medalist(s)	Nelly Chepchirchir	Kenya	3:57.02	8	SB
2nd place, silver medalist(s)	Sarah Healy	Ireland	3:57.15	7	PB
3rd place, bronze medalist(s)	Birke Haylom	Ethiopia	3:57.50	6	SB
4	Linden Hall	Australia	3:57.63	5	SB
5	Worknesh Mesele	Ethiopia	3:57.95	4	SB
6	Georgia Bell	Great Britain	3:58.06	3	SB
7	Agathe Guillemot	France	3:58.44	2	SB
8	Susan Ejore	Kenya	3:58.65	1	SB
9	Sarah Madeleine	France	3:59.06		PB
10	Salomé Afonso	Portugal	3:59.32		PB
11	Jemma Reekie	Great Britain	3:59.42		SB
12	Netsanet Desta	Ethiopia	4:00.69		PB
13	Georgia Griffith	Australia	4:01.36		
14	Saron Berhe	Ethiopia	4:01.41		
15	Esther Guerrero	Spain	4:01.86		SB
16	Abbey Caldwell	Australia	4:07.70		
—	Clara Liberman	France	DNF		PM

3000 metres steeplechase
Place	Athlete	Nation	Time	Points	Notes
1st place, gold medalist(s)	Faith Cherotich	Kenya	8:53.37	8	PB, WL
2nd place, silver medalist(s)	Peruth Chemutai	Uganda	8:54.41	7	SB
3rd place, bronze medalist(s)	Sembo Almayew	Ethiopia	9:01.22	6	SB
4	Gabrielle Jennings	United States	9:08.05	5	SB
5	Courtney Wayment	United States	9:08.88	4	SB
6	Lea Meyer	Germany	9:09.73	3	
7	Angelina Napoleon	United States	9:10.72	2	PB
8	Alice Finot	France	9:15.33	1	SB
9	Lomi Muleta	Ethiopia	9:15.45		
10	Gesa Felicitas Krause	Germany	9:28.75		SB
11	Flavie Renouard	France	9:34.23		
12	Caren Chebet	Kenya	9:40.04		PM
—	Agnieszka Chorzepa	Poland			PM

High jump
Place	Athlete	Nation	Height	Points	Notes
1st place, gold medalist(s)	Nicola Olyslagers	Australia	2.00 m	8	
2nd place, silver medalist(s)	Yaroslava Mahuchikh	Ukraine	1.97 m	7	
3rd place, bronze medalist(s)	Eleanor Patterson	Australia	1.97 m	6	
4	Vashti Cunningham	United States	1.94 m	5	=SB
5	Morgan Lake	Great Britain	1.94 m	4	
6	Charity Hufnagel	United States	1.91 m	3	
7	Christina Honsel	Germany	1.88 m	2	
7	Angelina Topić	Serbia	1.88 m	2	
9	Maria Żodzik	Poland	1.88 m		
10	Safina Sadullayeva	Uzbekistan	1.88 m		
11	Solène Gicquel	France	1.83 m		
11	Yuliya Levchenko	Ukraine	1.83 m		
13	Nadezhda Dubovitskaya	Kazakhstan	1.78 m		

Discus throw
Place	Athlete	Nation	Distance	Points	Notes
1st place, gold medalist(s)	Valarie Allman	United States	67.56 m	8	
2nd place, silver medalist(s)	Jorinde van Klinken	Netherlands	66.42 m	7	SB
3rd place, bronze medalist(s)	Yaime Perez	Cuba	65.03 m	6	
4	Sandra Elkasević	Croatia	63.52 m	5	
5	Feng Bin	China	62.80 m	4	
6	Amanda Ngandu-Ntumba	France	62.77 m	3	
7	Mélina Robert-Michon	France	61.16 m	2	
8	Vanessa Kamga	Sweden	60.69 m	1	
9	Marike Steinacker	Germany	60.65 m		
10	Laulauga Tausaga	United States	57.39 m		

== Promotional events results ==
=== Men's ===
1500 metres
Place	Athlete	Nation	Time	Notes
1st place, gold medalist(s)	Azeddine Habz	France	3:27.49	NR, MR, WL
2nd place, silver medalist(s)	Phanuel Koech	Kenya	3:27.72	WU20R
3rd place, bronze medalist(s)	George Mills	Great Britain	3:28.36	PB
4	Festus Lagat	Kenya	3:29.03	PB
5	Stefan Nillessen	Netherlands	3:29.23	NR
6	Abel Kipsang	Kenya	3:29.46	SB
7	Flavien Szot	France	3:30.74	PB
8	Ruben Verheyden	Belgium	3:30.99	NR
9	Tshepo Tshite	South Africa	3:31.35	NR
10	Pierrik Jocteur-Monrozier	France	3:31.51	PB
11	Romain Mornet	France	3:31.62	PB
12	Paul Anselmini	France	3:31.63	PB
13	Pieter Sisk	Belgium	3:31.85	PB
14	Louis Gilavert	France	3:32.25	PB
—	Mounir Akbache	France	DNF	PM
—	Žan Rudolf	Slovenia	DNF	PM

3000 metres steeplechase
Place	Athlete	Nation	Time	Notes
1st place, gold medalist(s)	Lamecha Girma	Ethiopia	8:07.01	SB
2nd place, silver medalist(s)	Salaheddine Ben Yazide	Morocco	8:11.68	
3rd place, bronze medalist(s)	Getnet Wale	Ethiopia	8:12.58	SB
4	Mohamed Tindouft	Morocco	8:15.32	SB
5	Baptiste Fourmont	France	8:17.58	
6	Djilali Bedrani	France	8:19.19	
7	Ahmed Jaziri	Tunisia	8:19.59	
8	Abrham Sime	Ethiopia	8:21.75	
9	Luc Le Baron	France	8:22.52	
10	Alejandro Quijada	Spain	8:24.39	
11	Faid El Mostafa	Morocco	8:25.26	
12	Víctor Ruiz	Spain	8:25.41	
13	Bilal Tabti	Algeria	8:28.99	
14	Ben Buckingham	Australia	8:47.89	
—	Ali Messaoudi	Algeria	DNF	PM
—	Wilberforce Kones	Kenya	DNF	PM

== See also ==
- 2025 Diamond League
