= 2025 Diamond League =

International athletics championship series

- Edition: 16th
- Dates: 26 April – 28 August 2025
- Events: 32
- Meetings: 15
- Individual Prize Money (US$): $9.24 million

The 2025 Diamond League was the sixteenth season of the annual series of outdoor track and field meetings, organised by World Athletics. The competition was a revision to the top level athletics series since Diamond League foundation in 2010. The number of Diamond Discipline events was 32. Each meeting hosted a number of Diamond Discipline events and some of these events would not be broadcast. Events losing Diamond Discipline status would feature on the World Athletics Continental Tour, the second tier of track and field meetings.

Starting in 2025, each meeting nominated 4 events (2 male and 2 female) to be Diamond+ Disciplines, these events will have increased levels of prize money; this will mean at regular meetings a doubling of the 1st place prize from $10,000 to $20,000 and at the Diamond League Finals an increase to $50,000.

The series concluded with the Diamond League Finals in Zürich, on the 27th and 28th August 2025.

== Schedule ==
The following fifteen meetings are scheduled to be included in the 2025 season.

Leg	Date	Meet	Stadium	City	Country	Diamond events (M+W) Diamond+ events
1	26 April	Xiamen Diamond League	Xiamen Egret Stadium	Xiamen	China	7 + 7 = 14; 2 + 2 = 4
2	3 May	Yangtze Delta Athletics Diamond Gala (temporary location of Diamond League Shanghai)	China Textile City Sports Centre	Shaoxing	China	8 + 6 = 14; 2 + 2 = 4
3	16 May	Doha Diamond League	Suheim bin Hamad Stadium	Doha	Qatar	8 + 6 = 14; 2 + 2 = 4
4	25 May	Meeting International Mohammed VI d'Athlétisme de Rabat	Rabat Olympic Stadium	Rabat	Morocco	8 + 6 = 14; 2 + 2 = 4
5	6 June	Golden Gala Pietro Mennea	Stadio Olimpico	Rome	Italy	7 + 7 = 14; 2 + 2 = 4
6	11-12 June	Bislett Games	Bislett Stadium	Oslo	Norway	7 + 6 = 13; 2 + 2 = 4
7	14-15 June	Bauhausgalan	Stockholm Olympic Stadium	Stockholm	Sweden	6 + 9 = 15; 2 + 2 = 4
8	20 June	Meeting de Paris	Stade Sébastien Charléty	Paris	France	6 + 8 = 14; 2 + 2 = 4
9	5 July	Prefontaine Classic	Hayward Field	Eugene	United States	6 + 8 = 14; 2 + 2 = 4
10	11 July	Herculis EBS	Stade Louis II	Fontvieille	Monaco	8 + 6 = 14; 2 + 2 = 4
11	19 July	London Athletics Meet	London Stadium	London	Great Britain	6 + 8 = 14; 2 + 2 = 4
12	15–16 August	Kamila Skolimowska Memorial	Stadion Śląski	Chorzów	Poland	7 + 7 = 14; 2 + 2 = 4
13	19–20 August	Athletissima	Stade Olympique de la Pontaise	Lausanne	Switzerland	7 + 7 = 14; 2 + 2 = 4
14	22 August	AG Memorial Van Damme	King Baudouin Stadium	Brussels	Belgium	7 + 7 = 14; 2 + 2 = 4
15	27–28 August	Weltklasse Zürich	Letzigrund	Zürich	Switzerland	16 + 16 = 32; 4 + 4 = 8

== Men's results ==
Denotes the event is a Diamond+ discipline
Denotes the event was not included as part of qualification for the Diamond League Finals

=== Track ===
#	Meeting	100 m	200 m	400 m	800 m	1500 m	5000 m	110 m h	400 m h	3000 m st
1	Xiamen	Akani Simbine (RSA); 9.99	-	Bayapo Ndori (BOT); 44.25 MR, SB	-	-	-	Cordell Tinch (USA); 13.06 WL	Karsten Warholm (NOR); 33.05 WR, WBP (300 m hurdles)	Samuel Firewu (ETH); 8:05.61 MR, WL
2	Shanghai/Keqiao	Akani Simbine (RSA); 9.98	-	Christopher Bailey (USA); 44.17 PB	-	-	Berihu Aregawi (ETH); 12:50.45 MR, SB	Cordell Tinch (USA); 12.87 MR, WL, PB	Karsten Warholm (NOR); 47.28 WL	Abrham Sime (ETH); 8:07.92 SB
3	Doha	-	Letsile Tebogo (BOT); 20.10 SB	-	Tshepiso Masalela (BOT); 1:43.11 WL	-	Reynold Cheruiyot (KEN); 13:16.40 PB	Rasheed Broadbell (JAM); 13.14 SB	Alessandro Sibilio (ITA); 49.32 SB	-
4	Meeting International de Rabat	Akani Simbine (RSA); 9.95	Courtney Lindsey (USA); 20.04	Jacory Patterson (USA); 44.37	Tshepiso Masalela (BOT); 1:42.70 MR, WL	Jonah Koech (USA); 3:31.43 MR, PB	-	-	-	Soufiane El Bakkali (MAR); 8:00.70 WL
5	Golden Gala	Trayvon Bromell (USA); 9.84 WL	-	Quincy Hall (USA); 44.22 SB	-	Azeddine Habz (FRA); 3:29.72 SB	-	Jason Joseph (SUI); 13.14 SB	-	-
6	Bislett Games	-	Reynier Mena (CUB); 20.20	-	Emmanuel Wanyonyi (KEN); 1:42.78 SB	Isaac Nader (POR); 3:48.25 NR (Mile)	Nico Young (USA); 12:45.27 PB	-	Karsten Warholm (NOR); 32.67 WR, WBP, DLR (300 m hurdles)	-
7	Bauhausgalan	Benjamin Azamati (GHA); 10.18	Reynier Mena (CUB); 20.05 SB	-	Emmanuel Wanyonyi (KEN); 1:41.95 WL	Samuel Pihlström (SWE); 3:31.53	Andreas Almgren (SWE); 12:44.27 AR, MR	-	Rai Benjamin (USA); 46.54 MR, WL	Karl Bebendorf (GER); 8:11.81 PB
8	Meeting de Paris	-	-	-	Mohamed Attaoui (ESP); 1:42.73 SB	Azeddine Habz (FRA); 3:27.49 MR, WL, NR	Yomif Kejelcha (ETH); 12:47.84 SB	Trey Cunningham (USA); 13.00 =PB	Rai Benjamin (USA); 46.93 MR	Lamecha Girma (ETH); 8:07.01 SB
9	Prefontaine Classic	Kishane Thompson (JAM); 9.85	Letsile Tebogo (BOT); 19.76 WL	Matthew Hudson-Smith (GBR); 44.10 SB	-	Niels Laros (NED); 3:45.94 NR (Mile)	-	-	Alison dos Santos (BRA); 46.66 SB	-
10	Herculis	-	Noah Lyles (USA); 19.88 SB	-	Emmanuel Wanyonyi (KEN); 1:41.44 MR, WL	-	Yomif Kejelcha (ETH); 12:49.46	Trey Cunningham (USA); 13.09	-	Soufiane El Bakkali (MAR); 8:03.18
11	London Athletics Meet	Oblique Seville (JAM); 9.86	-	Charles Dobson (GBR); 44.14 PB	Emmanuel Wanyonyi (KEN); 1:42.00	Phanuel Koech (KEN); 3:28.82 MR	-	-	-	-
12	Kamila Skolimowska Memorial	Kishane Thompson (JAM); 9.87 =MR	-	-	-	Yared Nuguse (USA); 3:33.19	-	Cordell Tinch (USA); 13.03 =MR	Karsten Warholm (NOR) 46.28 DLR, WL	-
13	Athletissima	Oblique Seville (JAM); 9.87	-	-	Josh Hoey (USA); 1:42.82	-	Isaac Kimeli (BEL); 13:07.67	Cordell Tinch (USA); 12.98	Ezekiel Nathaniel (NGR); 48.08	-
14	Memorial Van Damme	-	Alexander Ogando (DOM); 20.16	Jacory Patterson (USA); 44.05	-	Niels Laros (NED); 3:30.58 SB	-	-	-	Ruben Querinjean (LUX); 8:09.47 NR
15	Weltklasse Zürich	Christian Coleman (USA); 9.97	Noah Lyles (USA); 19.74	Jacory Patterson (USA); 43.85 PB	Emmanuel Wanyonyi (KEN); 1:42.37	Niels Laros (NED); 3:29.20 NR	Jimmy Gressier (FRA); 7:36.78 (3000 m)	Cordell Tinch (USA); 12.92 =MR	Karsten Warholm (NOR) 46.70 MR	Frederik Ruppert (GER); 8:09.02

=== Field ===
#	Meeting	Long jump	Triple jump	High jump	Pole vault	Shot put	Discus	Javelin
1	Xiamen	Zhang Mingkun (CHN); 8.18 m	Jordan Scott (JAM); 17.27 m PB	-	Armand Duplantis (SWE); 5.92 m	-	-	-
2	Shanghai/Keqiao	Shi Yuhao (CHN); 8.21 m SB	Pedro Pichardo (POR); 17.03 m SB	-	Armand Duplantis (SWE); 6.11 m MR	-	-	-
3	Doha	-	-	Shelby McEwen (USA); 2.26 m =SB	-	-	Matthew Denny (AUS); 68.97 m	Julian Weber (GER); 91.06 m WL, PB
4	Meeting International de Rabat	-	-	Hamish Kerr (NZL); 2.25 m	-	Payton Otterdahl (USA); 21.97 m WL	-	-
5	Golden Gala	Liam Adcock (AUS); 8.34 m PB	-	Sanghyeok Woo (KOR); 2.32 m SB	-	Tom Walsh (NZL); 21.89 m SB	-	-
6	Bislett Games	-	Jordan Scott (JAM); 17.34 m PB	-	Armand Duplantis (SWE); 6.15 m MR	-	-	-
7	Bauhausgalan	-	-	-	Armand Duplantis (SWE); 6.28 m WR	-	Kristjan Čeh (SLO); 69.73 m	-
8	Meeting de Paris	-	Jordan Scott (JAM); 17.27 m	-	-	-	-	Neeraj Chopra (IND); 88.16 m
9	Prefontaine Classic	-	-	-	Armand Duplantis (SWE); 6.00 m	Joe Kovacs (USA); 22.48 m WL	Mykolas Alekna (LIT); 70.97 m	-
10	Herculis	-	Jordan Scott (JAM); 17.52 m PB	Sanghyeok Woo (KOR); 2.34 m =WL	Armand Duplantis (SWE); 6.05 m MR	-	-	-
11	London Athletics Meet	Wayne Pinnock (JAM); 8.20 m	-	-	-	-	Mykolas Alekna (LIT); 71.70 m DLR	-
12	Kamila Skolimowska Memorial	-	-	Hamish Kerr (NZL); 2.33 m SB	Armand Duplantis (SWE); 6.10 m	Payton Otterdahl (USA); 22.28 m	-	Julius Yego (KEN); 83.60 m
13	Athletissima	Anvar Anvarov (UZB); 7.84 m	-	-	Emmanouil Karalis (GRE); 6.02 m	Joe Kovacs (USA); 22.04 m	-	-
14	Memorial Van Damme	-	-	Oleh Doroshchuk (UKR); 2.25 m	-	-	Ralford Mullings (JAM); 69.66 m	Julian Weber (GER); 89.65 m
15	Weltklasse Zürich	Simon Ehammer (SUI); 8.32 m	Andy Díaz Hernández (ITA); 17.56 m	Hamish Kerr (NZL); 2.32 m	Armand Duplantis (SWE); 6.00 m	Joe Kovacs (USA); 22.46 m	Mykolas Alekna (LTU); 68.89 m	Julian Weber (GER); 91.51 m WL, PB

== Women's results ==
Denotes the event is a Diamond+ discipline
Denotes the event was not included as part of qualification for the Diamond League Finals

=== Track ===
#	Meeting	100 m	200 m	400 m	800 m	1500 m	5000 m	100 m h	400 m h	3000 m st
1	Xiamen	-	Anavia Battle (USA); 22.41 MR, SB	-	Faith Kipyegon (KEN); 2:29.21 MR, WL (1000 m)	-	Beatrice Chebet (KEN); 14:27.12 MR, WL	Danielle Williams (JAM); 12.53 SB	-	-
2	Shanghai/Keqiao	-	Anavia Battle (USA); 22.38 SB	-	Tsige Duguma (ETH); 1:56.64 MR, WL, NR	-	-	Grace Stark (USA); 12.42 MR, WL	-	-
3	Doha	Tia Clayton (JAM); 10.92 WL	-	Salwa Eid Naser (BHR); 49.83 =MR	-	Nelly Chepchirchir (KEN); 4:05.00 SB	-	-	-	Faith Cherotich (KEN); 9:05.08 WL
4	Meeting International de Rabat	Shericka Jackson (JAM); 11.04 SB	-	-	Tsige Duguma (ETH); 1:57.42	Nelly Chepchirchir (KEN); 3:58.04 SB	Beatrice Chebet (KEN); 8:11.56 AR, DLR,WL (3000 m)	Tobi Amusan (NGR); 12.45 MR, SB	Femke Bol (NED); 52.46 MR, SB	-
5	Golden Gala	-	Anavia Battle (USA); 22.53	-	-	Sarah Healy (IRL); 3:59.17 SB	Beatrice Chebet (KEN); 14:03.69 MR, WL, NR	-	Andrenette Knight (JAM); 53.67 SB	-
6	Bislett Games	Julien Alfred (LCA); 10.89 SB	-	Isabella Whittaker (USA); 49.58	-	-	-	-	Dalilah Muhammad (USA); 53.34 SB	Faith Cherotich (KEN); 9:02.60 MR, WL
7	Bauhausgalan	Julien Alfred (LCA); 10.75 MR, SB	Thelma Davies (LBR); 22.41	Isabella Whittaker (USA); 49.78	Georgia Hunter Bell (GBR); 1:57.66 SB	-	Linden Hall (AUS); 8:30.01 PB (3000 m)	Grace Stark (USA); 12.33 MR, SB	Femke Bol (NED); 52.11 MR, SB	-
8	Meeting de Paris	-	Anavia Battle (USA); 22.27 SB	Marileidy Paulino (DOM); 48.81 MR, SB	-	Nelly Chepchirchir (KEN); 3:57.02 SB	-	Grace Stark (USA); 12.21 MR, PB	-	Faith Cherotich (KEN); 8:53.37 WL, PB
9	Prefontaine Classic	Melissa Jefferson-Wooden (USA); 10.75	-	Sydney McLaughlin-Levrone (USA); 49.43 SB	Tsige Duguma (ETH); 1:57.10	Faith Kipyegon (KEN); 3:48.68 WR	Beatrice Chebet (KEN); 13:58.06 WR	Ackera Nugent (JAM); 12.32	-	Winfred Yavi (BHR); 8:45.25 MR, WL
10	Herculis	Julien Alfred (LCA); 10.79	-	Marileidy Paulino (DOM); 49.06	Nelly Chepchirchir (KEN); 2:29.77 PB (1000 m)	-	-	Megan Tapper (JAM); 12.34 =PB	Femke Bol (NED); 51.95 MR, WL	-
11	London Athletics Meet	-	Julien Alfred (LCA); 21.71 MR, WL, NR, PB	-	Georgia Hunter Bell (GBR); 1:56.74 SB	Gudaf Tsegay (ETH); 4:11.88 MR, NR, WL (Mile)	Medina Eisa (ETH); 14:30.57	-	Femke Bol (NED); 52.10	-
12	Kamila Skolimowska Memorial	Melissa Jefferson-Wooden (USA); 10.66 =MR	Shericka Jackson (JAM); 22.17 SB	Marileidy Paulino (DOM); 49.18	Keely Hodgkinson (GBR); 1:54.74 MR, WL	Gudaf Tsegay (ETH); 3:50.62 MR, SB	Faith Kipyegon (KEN); 8:07.04 AR, DLR, WL (3000 m)	Masai Russell (USA); 12.19 DLR	Femke Bol (NED); 51.91 MR, WL	-
13	Athletissima	-	Brittany Brown (USA); 22.23	Henriette Jæger (NOR); 50.09	Keely Hodgkinson (GBR); 1:55.69 MR	-	-	Nadine Visser (NED); 12.45	-	Doris Lemngole (KEN); 9:16.36
14	Memorial Van Damme	Melissa Jefferson-Wooden (USA); 10.76	-	-	-	Nikki Hiltz (USA); 3:55.94 SB	Agnes Jebet Ngetich (KEN); 14:24.99	-	Anna Cockrell (USA); 53.66	-
15	Weltklasse Zürich	Julien Alfred (LCA); 10.76	Brittany Brown (USA); 22.13 SB	Salwa Eid Naser (BHR); 48.70 MR	Audrey Werro (SUI); 1:55.91 NR	Nelly Chepchirchir (KEN); 3:56.99 SB	Fantaye Belayneh (ETH); 8:40.56 (3000 m)	Ackera Nugent (JAM); 12.30 =SB	Femke Bol (NED); 52.18 MR	Faith Cherotich (KEN); 8:57.24

=== Field ===
#	Meeting	Long jump	Triple jump	High jump	Pole vault	Shot put	Discus	Javelin
1	Xiamen	-	-	Yaroslava Mahuchikh (UKR); 1.97 m	-	Jessica Schilder (NED); 20.47 m MR	Valarie Allman (USA); 68.95 m	Elina Tzengko (GRE); 64.75 m MR, SB
2	Shanghai/Keqiao	-	-	Yaroslava Mahuchikh (UKR); 2.00 m	-	Chase Jackson (USA); 20.54 m MR, SB	Valarie Allman (USA); 70.08 m	Elina Tzengko (GRE); 64.90 m SB
3	Doha	-	Shanieka Ricketts (JAM); 14.72 m w	-	Molly Caudery (GBR); 4.75 m	-	-	-
4	Meeting International de Rabat	-	-	-	Katie Moon (USA); 4.73 m	-	-	Elina Tzengko (GRE); 64.60 m
5	Golden Gala	-	Shanieka Ricketts (JAM); 14.64 m SB	-	Sandi Morris (USA); 4.80 m SB	-	Valarie Allman (USA); 69.21 m MR	-
6	Bislett Games	-	Leyanis Pérez Hernández (CUB); 14.72 m	-	-	-	-	Haruka Kitaguchi (JPN); 64.63 m SB
7	Bauhausgalan	Tara Davis-Woodhall (USA); 7.05 m (+1.3 m/s) =MR, SB	-	Nicola Olyslagers (AUS); 2.01 m SB	Sandi Morris (USA); 4.82 m SB	-	Kristin Pudenz (GER); 64.85 m	-
8	Meeting de Paris	-	-	Nicola Olyslagers (AUS); 2.00 m	Katie Moon (USA); 4.73 m	-	Valarie Allman (USA); 67.56 m	-
9	Prefontaine Classic	Tara Davis-Woodhall (USA); 7.07 m (+1.8 m/s) =WL	-	-	-	Chase Jackson (USA); 20.94 m MR	Valarie Allman (USA); 70.68 m MR	-
10	Herculis	-	-	-	-	Jessica Schilder (NED); 20.39 m	-	-
11	London Athletics Meet	Malaika Mihambo (GER); 6.93 m	-	Morgan Lake (GBR); 1.96 m =SB	Olivia McTaggart (NZL); 4.73 m PB	-	-	-
12	Kamila Skolimowska Memorial	Jasmine Moore (USA); 6.85 m MR	-	Yaroslava Mahuchikh (UKR); 2.00 m MR	Marie-Julie Bonnin (FRA); 4.70 m	Jessica Schilder (NED); 19.66 m	-	-
13	Athletissima	-	-	Christina Honsel (GER); Nicola Olyslagers (AUS); Maria Żodzik (POL); 1.91 m	Lea Bachmann (SUI); Hanga Klekner (HUN); Angelica Moser (SUI); 4.35 m	-	-	Adriana Vilagoš (SRB); 63.02 m
14	Memorial Van Damme	-	Leyanis Pérez Hernández (CUB); 14.78 m	-	Katie Moon (USA); 4.85 m	Chase Jackson (USA); 20.90 m MR	-	-
15	Weltklasse Zürich	Larissa Iapichino (ITA); 6.93 m	Leyanis Pérez Hernández (CUB); 14.91 m	Nicola Olyslagers (AUS); 2.04 m AR, WL	Katie Moon (USA); 4.82 m	Jessica Schilder (NED); 20.26 m	Valarie Allman (USA); 69.18 m	Elina Tzengko (GRE); 64.57 m

== Diamond League Finals ==
=== Men ===
==== 100 metres ====
Qualification

Rank	Name	Nationality	Wins	Points
1	Akani Simbine	South Africa	3	35
2	Kishane Thompson	Jamaica	2	23
3	Noah Lyles	United States		21
4	Emmanuel Eseme	Cameroon		20
5	Ferdinand Omanyala	Kenya		20
6	Trayvon Bromell	United States	1	18
7	Zharnel Hughes	Great Britain		17
8	Brandon Hicklin	United States		17*
9	Oblique Seville	Jamaica	2	16
10	Christian Coleman	United States		16*
11	Ackeem Blake	Jamaica		16*
12	Jeremiah Azu	Great Britain		11*
13	Letsile Tebogo	Botswana		10
14	Fred Kerley	United States		10
15	Courtney Lindsey	United States		8
16	Kenny Bednarek	United States		6
17	Lachlan Kennedy	Australia		5
18	Bayanda Walaza	South Africa		3*
19	Rohan Watson	Jamaica		3
20	Shaun Maswanganyi	South Africa		3*
21	Filippo Tortu	Italy		2
22	Xie Zhenye	China		2
23	Jeff Erius	France		2
24	Louie Hinchliffe	Great Britain		1
25	Kyree King	United States		1
26	Abdul Hakim Sani Brown	Japan		1
27	Timothé Mumenthaler	Switzerland		1

Top 7 qualified as of right.
Athletes marked with * called up as reserves for Final

Final

Place	Athlete	Nation	Time	Notes
	Christian Coleman	United States	9.97	
2	Akani Simbine	South Africa	9.98	
3	Ackeem Blake	Jamaica	9.99	
4	Jeremiah Azu	Great Britain	10.03	
5	Brandon Hicklin	United States	10.09	
6	Trayvon Bromell	United States	10.14	
7	Shaun Maswanganyi	South Africa	10.19	
8	Bayanda Walaza	South Africa	12.10	
			Wind: (−0.4 m/s)	

==== 200 metres ====
Qualification

Rank	Name	Nationality	Wins	Points
1	Joseph Fahnbulleh	Liberia		29
2	Letsile Tebogo	Botswana	2	23
3	Courtney Lindsey	United States	1	22
4	Alexander Ogando	Dominican Republic	1	19
5	Robert Gregory	United States		17
6	Reynier Mena	Cuba	2	16
7	Kyree King	United States		15
8	Makanakaishe Charamba	Zimbabwe		10
9	Aaron Brown	Canada		10
10	Timothé Mumenthaler	Switzerland		9
11	Noah Lyles	United States	1	8*
12	Filippo Tortu	Italy		8
13	Jereem Richards	Trinidad and Tobago		7
14	Fred Kerley	United States		6
15	Udodi Chudi Onwuzurike	Nigeria		6*
16	Andre de Grasse	Canada		6
17	Christian Coleman	United States		5
18	Henrik Larsson	Sweden		5
19	Wayde van Niekerk	South Africa		4
20	Xavi Mo-Ajok	Netherlands		4
21	Abduraqhman Karriem	South Africa		4
22	Bryan Levell	Jamaica		3
23	Erik Erlandsson	Sweden		3
24	Benjamin Richardson	South Africa		2
25	Vernon Norwood	United States		2
26	Shaun Maswanganyi	South Africa		2
27	Joshua Hartmann	Germany		2
28	Ryan Zeze	France		1
29	Téo Andant	France		1
30	William Reais	Switzerland		1
31	Kobe Vleminckx	Belgium		1

Top 7 qualified as of right.
Athletes marked with * called up as reserves for Final

Final

Place	Athlete	Nation	Time	Notes
	Noah Lyles	United States	19.74	
2	Letsile Tebogo	Botswana	19.76	=SB
3	Alexander Ogando	Dominican Republic	20.14	
4	Robert Gregory	United States	20.20	
5	Reynier Mena	Cuba	20.26	
6	Kyree King	United States	20.43	
7	Udodi Onwuzurike	Nigeria	20.46	
8	Joseph Fahnbulleh	Liberia	20.54	
			Wind: (−0.6 m/s)	

==== 400 metres ====
Qualification

Rank	Name	Nationality	Wins	Points
1	Busang Kebinatshipi	Botswana		25
2	Vernon Norwood	United States		24
3	Jacory Patterson	United States	2	22
4	Charlie Dobson	Great Britain	1	22
5	Christopher Bailey	United States	1	22
6	Zakithi Nene	South Africa		20
7	Bayapo Ndori	Botswana	1	18
8	Matthew Hudson-Smith	Great Britain	1	15
9	Quincy Hall	United States	1	15
10	Kirani James	Grenada		14
11	Alexander Doom	Belgium		12*
12	Muzala Samukonga	Zambia		8*
13	Khaleb McCrae	United States		5
14	Daniel Seger	Belgium		5*
15	Bryce Deadmon	United States		5
16	Christopher Morales Williams	Canada		4
17	Lythe Pillay	South Africa		4
18	Reece Holder	Australia		3
19	Johnnie Blockburger	United States		3
20	Leungo Scotch	Botswana		2
21	Håvard Bentdal Ingvaldsen	Norway		1
22	Toby Harries	Great Britain		1
23	Edoardo Scotti	Italy		1
24	Walid El Boussiri	Morocco		1

Top 7 qualified as of right.
Athletes marked with * called up as reserves for Final

Final

Place	Athlete	Nation	Time	Notes
	Jacory Patterson	United States	43.85	PB
2	Bayapo Ndori	Botswana	44.40	
3	Vernon Norwood	United States	44.45	
4	Muzala Samukonga	Zambia	44.49	
5	Christopher Bailey	United States	44.75	
6	Daniel Segers	Belgium	45.01	
7	Collen Kebinatshipi	Botswana	45.40	
8	Alexander Doom	Belgium	45.61	

==== 800 metres ====
Qualification

Rank	Name	Nationality	Wins	Points
1	Emmanuel Wanyonyi	Kenya	4	45
2	Josh Hoey	United States	1	28
3	Mohamed Attaoui	Spain	1	25
4	Max Burgin	Great Britain		23
5	Tshepiso Masalela	Botswana	2	21
6	Bryce Hoppel	United States		20
7	Djamel Sedjati	Algeria		19
8	Marco Arop	Canada		15*
9	Gabriel Tual	France		14
10	Slimane Moula	Algeria		12
11	Wyclife Kinyamal	Kenya		11
12	Kethobogile Haingura	Botswana		11
13	Andreas Kramer	Sweden		10
14	Mark English	Ireland		7
15	Peter Bol	Australia		5
16	Brandon Miller	United States		5
17	Ibrahim Abass M Chuot	Qatar		4
18	Donavan Brazier	United States		3
19	Yanis Meziane	France		3
20	Abderrahman El Assa,	Morocco		2
21	Abdelati El Guesse	Morocco		2
22	Aaron Cheminingwa	Kenya		1
23	Ivan Pelizza	Switzerland		1

Top 7 qualified as of right.
Athletes marked with * called up as reserves for Final

Final

Place	Athlete	Nation	Time	Notes
	Emmanuel Wanyonyi	Kenya	1:42.37	
2	Max Burgin	Great Britain	1:42.42	
3	Marco Arop	Canada	1:42.57	
4	Djamel Sedjati	Algeria	1:42.84	
5	Tshepiso Masalela	Botswana	1:43.16	
6	Mohamed Attaoui	Spain	1:43.35	
7	Bryce Hoppel	United States	1:43.78	
8	Josh Hoey	United States	1:44.25	
—	Patryk Sieradzki	Poland	DNF	PM

==== 1500 metres ====
Qualification

Rank	Name	Nationality	Wins	Points
1	Reynold Cheruiyot	Kenya		23
2	Yared Nuguse	United States	1	21
3	Timothy Cheruiyot	Kenya		21
4	Azeddine Habz	France	1	19
5	Isaac Nader	Portugal	1	19
6	Niels Laros	Netherlands	2	16
7	Phanuel Koech	Kenya	1	15
8	Anass Essayi	Morocco		13
9	Cameron Myers	Australia		13
10	Robert Farken	Germany		9
11	Jonah Koech	United States	1	8
12	Narve Gilje Nordås	Norway		8*
13	Josh Kerr	Great Britain		7
14	Samuel Pihlström	Sweden		7
15	Elliot Giles	Great Britain		7
16	Jake Wightman	Great Britain		6
17	Festus Lagat	Kenya		6
18	Stefan Nillessen	Netherlands		6
19	Cole Hocker	United States		5
20	Vincent Ciattei	United States		4
21	Thomas Jude	Australia		4
22	Ruben Verheyden	Belgium		4
23	Josh Hoey	United States		4
24	Hobbs Kessler	United States		2
25	Brian Komen	Kenya		1
26	Cathal Doyle	Ireland		1
27	Louis Gilavert	France		1
28	Adam Spencer	Australia		1
29	Oliver Hoare	Australia		1

Top 10 qualified as of right.
Athletes marked with * called up as reserves for Final

Final

Place	Athlete	Nation	Time	Notes
	Niels Laros	Netherlands	3:29.20	NR
2	Reynold Cheruiyot	Kenya	3:29.91	PB
3	Phanuel Koech	Kenya	3:30.02	
4	Timothy Cheruiyot	Kenya	3:30.13	
5	Azeddine Habz	France	3:30.39	
6	Anass Essayi	Morocco	3:30.67	PB
7	Yared Nuguse	United States	3:30.84	
8	Samuel Pihlström	Sweden	3:31.15	
9	Robert Farken	Germany	3:31.30	
10	Isaac Nader	Portugal	3:35.70	
—	Filip Rak	Poland	DNF	PM
—	Žan Rudolf	Slovenia	DNF	PM

==== 5000 metres ====
Qualification

Rank	Name	Nationality	Wins	Points
1	Kuma Girma	Ethiopia		20
2	Birhanu Balew	Bahrain		19
3	Yomif Kejelcha	Ethiopia	2	17
4	Samuel Tefera	Ethiopia		14
5	Jimmy Gressier	France		12
6	Nico Young	United States	1	10
7	Dominic Lobalu	Switzerland		10
8	Mohamed Abdilaahi	Germany		10
9	Graham Blanks	United States		9
10	Andreas Almgren	Sweden	1	8
11	Hagos Gebrhiwet	Ethiopia		8
12	Berihu Aregawi	Ethiopia	1	8
13	Keneth Kiprop	Uganda		8
14	Isaac Kimeli	Belgium	1	8
15	Reynold Cheruiyot	Kenya	1	8
16	Biniam Mehary	Ethiopia		7*
17	Grant Fisher	United States		7*
18	Edwin Kurgat	Kenya		7
19	Mezgebu Sime	Ethiopia		6
20	Ky Robinson	Australia		6
21	Eduardo Herrera	Mexico		6
22	George Mills	Great Britain		5
23	Nicholas Kipkorir	Kenya		5
24	Mike Foppen	Netherlands		5
25	Etienne Daguinos	France		4
26	Ishmael Kipkurui	Kenya		4
27	Cornelius Kemboi	Kenya		4
28	Thierry Ndikumwenayo	Spain		3
29	Soufiane El Bakkali	Morocco		3
30	Denis Kipkoech	Kenya		3
31	Cole Hocker	United States		2
32	Benson Kiplangat	Kenya		2
33	Yann Schrub	France		1
34	Telahun Haile Bekele	Ethiopia		1
35	Morgan Beadlescomb	United States		1
36	Abdullahi Jama Mahamed	Somalia		1

Top 10 qualified as of right.
Athletes marked with * called up as reserves for Final

Final

Place	Athlete	Nation	Time	Notes
	Jimmy Gressier	France	7:36.78	
2	Grant Fisher	United States	7:36.81	
3	Andreas Almgren	Sweden	7:36.82	
4	Mohamed Abdilaahi	Germany	7:37.31	PB
5	Biniam Mehary	Ethiopia	7:37.33	
6	Graham Blanks	United States	7:38.15	
7	George Mills	Great Britain	7:38.71	
8	Samuel Tefera	Ethiopia	7:38.93	
9	Jonas Raess	Switzerland	7:46.82	
10	Mike Foppen	Netherlands	7:47.04	
11	Kuma Girma	Ethiopia	7:51.33	
12	Wegene Adisu	Ethiopia	7:54.16	PB, PM
—	Mounir Akbache	France	DNF	PM

==== 110 metres hurdles ====
Qualification

Rank	Name	Nationality	Wins	Points
1	Cordell Tinch	United States	3	38
2	Rachid Muratake	Japan		24
3	Trey Cunningham	United States	2	22
4	Dylan Beard	United States		19
5	Jason Joseph	Switzerland	1	19
6	Jamal Britt	United States		17
7	Rasheed Broadbell	Jamaica	1	14
8	Enrique Llopis	Spain		13*
9	Liu Junxi	China		10
10	Daniel Roberts	United States		10
11	Lorenzo Simonelli	Italy		9
12	Just Kwaou-Mathey	France		9
13	Xu Zhuoyi	China		7
14	Ja'Kobe Tharp	United States		6
15	Orlando Bennett	Jamaica		6*
16	Freddie Crittenden	United States		5*
17	Asier Martínez	Spain		5
18	Grant Holloway	United States		4
19	Hansle Parchment	Jamaica		3
20	Wilhem Belocian	France		3
21	Oumar Doudai Abakar	Qatar		3
22	Erwann Cinna	France		2
23	Shunsuke Izumiya	Japan		1
24	Omar McLeod	Jamaica		1
25	Yaqoub Alyouha	Kuwait		1

Top 7 qualified as of right.
Athletes marked with * called up as reserves for Final

Final

Place	Athlete	Nation	Time	Notes
	Cordell Tinch	United States	12.92	=MR
2	Enrique Llopis	Spain	13.12	SB
3	Jamal Britt	United States	13.21	
4	Jason Joseph	Switzerland	13.22	
5	Freddie Crittenden	United States	13.23	
6	Trey Cunningham	United States	13.32	
7	Orlando Bennett	Jamaica	13.35	
8	Rachid Muratake	Japan	14.39	
			Wind: (+0.3 m/s)	

==== 400 metres hurdles ====
Qualification

Rank	Name	Nationality	Wins	Points
1	Karsten Warholm	Norway	4	38
2	Rai Benjamin	United States	2	30
3	Matheus Lima	Brazil		23
4	Abderrahman Samba	Qatar		22
5	Alison dos Santos	Brazil	1	21
6	Carl Bengtström	Sweden		18
7	Trevor Bassitt	United States		17
8	Berke Akçam	Turkey		15*
9	Ezekiel Nathaniel	Nigeria		13*
10	CJ Allen	United States		11*
11	Alessandro Sibilio	Italy	1	9
12	Emil Agyekum	Germany		8
13	Alastair Chalmers	Great Britain		8*
14	Kyron McMaster	British Virgin Islands		7
15	İsmail Nezir	Turkey		7
16	Ken Toyoda	Japan		6
17	Matic Ian Guček	Slovenia		6
18	Chris Robinson	United States		5
19	Roshawn Clarke	Jamaica		3
20	Fantin Crisci	France		3
21	Xie Zhiyu	China		3
22	Nick Smidt	Netherlands		3
23	Gerald Drummond	Costa Rica		2
24	Assinie Wilson	Jamaica		2
25	Karl Wållgren	Sweden		2
26	Hugo Menin	France		2
27	Patrik Dömötör	Slovakia		1
28	Malik James-King	Jamaica		1

Top 7 qualified as of right.
Athletes marked with * called up as reserves for Final

Final

Place	Athlete	Nation	Time	Notes
	Karsten Warholm	Norway	46.70	MR
2	Abderrahman Samba	Qatar	47.45	
3	Ezekiel Nathaniel	Nigeria	47.56	
4	CJ Allen	United States	48.00	SB
5	Matheus Lima	Brazil	48.21	
6	Trevor Bassitt	United States	48.29	
7	Alastair Chalmers	Great Britain	48.88	
8	Berke Akçam	Turkey	49.01	

==== 3000 metres steeplechase ====
Qualification

Rank	Name	Nationality	Wins	Points
1	Edmund Serem	Kenya		24
2	Soufiane El Bakkali	Morocco	2	23
3	Samuel Firewu	Ethiopia	1	19
4	Simon Koech	Kenya		12
5	Getnet Wale	Ethiopia		11
6	Ryuji Miura	Japan		10
7	Mohamed Amin Jhinaoui	Tunisia		9
8	Abraham Kibiwot	Kenya		9
9	Abrham Sime	Ethiopia	1	8
10	Ruben Querinjean	Luxembourg	1	8
11	Frederik Ruppert	Germany		7
12	Daniel Arce	Spain		7
13	Salaheddine Ben Yazide	Morocco		6*
14	Karl Bebendorf	Germany		6
15	Isaac Updike	United States		6*
16	Hailemariyam Amare	Ethiopia		4
17	Nicolas-Marie Daru	France		4*
18	Matthew Wilkinson	United States		2
19	Tim van de Velde	Belgium		2*
20	Samuel Duguna	Ethiopia		1
21	Zakaria El Ahlaami	Qatar		1
22	Avinash Mukund Sable	India		1

Top 10 qualified as of right.
Athletes marked with * called up as reserves for Final

Final

Place	Athlete	Nation	Time	Notes
	Frederik Ruppert	Germany	8:09.02	
2	Edmund Serem	Kenya	8:09.96	
3	Salaheddine Ben Yazide	Morocco	8:14.10	
4	Daniel Arce	Spain	8:14.36	
5	Nicolas-Marie Daru	France	8:18.68	
6	Isaac Updike	United States	8:19.47	
7	Mohamed Amin Jhinaoui	Tunisia	8:24.75	
8	Abrham Sime	Ethiopia	8:28.13	
9	Tim Van de Velde	Belgium	8:31.52	
—	Wilberforce Kones	Kenya	DNF	PM
—	Wesley Langat	Kenya	DNF	PM

==== High Jump ====
Qualification

Rank	Name	Nationality	Wins	Points
1	Hamish Kerr	New Zealand	2	34
2	Romaine Beckford	Jamaica		28
3	JuVaughn Harrison	United States		23
4	Oleh Doroshchuk	Ukraine	1	21
5	Shelby McEwen	United States	1	18
6	Woo Sanghyeok	South Korea	2	16
7	Marco Fassinotti	Italy		13*
8	Jan Štefela	Czech Republic		11
9	Matteo Sioli	Italy		8
10	Thomas Carmoy	Belgium		7
11	Yual Reath	Australia		7
12	Raymond Richards	Jamaica		7
13	Ryoichi Akamatsu	Japan		7
14	Jonathan Kapitolnik	Israel		5
15	Vernon Turner	United States		5
16	Tomohiro Shinno	Japan		5
17	Elijah Kosiba	United States		3
18	Edgar Rivera	Mexico		3
19	Mateusz Kołodziejski	Poland		2
20	Donald Thomas	Bahamas		2
21	Manuel Lando	Italy		2
22	Jef Vermeiren	Belgium		1

Top 6 qualified as of right.
Athletes marked with * called up as reserves for Final

Final

Place	Athlete	Nation	Height	Notes
	Hamish Kerr	New Zealand	2.32 m	
2	Oleh Doroshchuk	Ukraine	2.30 m	
3	JuVaughn Harrison	United States	2.25 m	
4	Romaine Beckford	Jamaica	2.22 m	
5	Marco Fassinotti	Italy	2.19 m	
6	Shelby McEwen	United States	2.13 m	

==== Pole Vault ====
Qualification

Rank	Name	Nationality	Wins	Points
1	Armand Duplantis	Sweden	6	48
2	Emmanouil Karalis	Greece	1	44
3	Menno Vloon	Netherlands		35
4	Kurtis Marschall	Australia		33
5	Renaud Lavillenie	France		26
6	Sam Kendricks	United States		21
7	Ersu Şaşma	Turkey		15
8	Ben Broeders	Belgium		12
9	Ernest John Obiena	Philippines		10
10	Thibaut Collet	France		7
11	Daniel Keaton	United States		4
12	Sondre Guttormsen	Norway		2
13	Austin Miller	United States		2
14	Li Chenyang	China		1

Top 6 qualified as of right.

Final

Place	Athlete	Nation	Height	Notes
	Armand Duplantis	Sweden	6.00 m	
2	Emmanouil Karalis	Greece	6.00 m	
3	Sam Kendricks	United States	5.80 m	
4	Kurtis Marschall	Australia	5.65 m	
4	Menno Vloon	Netherlands	5.65 m	
—	Renaud Lavillenie	France	NM	

==== Long Jump ====
Qualification

Rank	Name	Nationality	Wins	Points
1	Liam Adcock	Australia	1	19
2	Wayne Pinnock	Jamaica	1	16
3	Miltiadis Tentoglou	Greece		15
4	Mattia Furlani	Italy		15
5	Carey McLeod	Jamaica		15
6	Simon Ehammer	Switzerland		14
7	Zhang Mingkun	China	1	8
8	Anvar Anvarov	Uzbekistan	1	8
9	Tajay Gayle	Jamaica		7
10	Marquis Dendy	United States		6
11	Shu Heng	China		5
12	Lester Lescay	Spain		5
13	Isaac Grimes	United States		3
14	Bozhidar Sarâboyukov	Bulgaria		2
15	Simon Batz	Germany		2
16	Samuel Khogali	Great Britain		2
17	Thobias Montler	Sweden		1

Top 6 qualified as of right.

Final

Place	Athlete	Nation	Distance	Notes
	Simon Ehammer	Switzerland	8.32 m (−0.6 m/s)	
2	Mattia Furlani	Italy	8.30 m (+0.7 m/s)	
3	Liam Adcock	Australia	8.24 m (−0.3 m/s)	
4	Wayne Pinnock	Jamaica	8.15 m (+N/W m/s)	
5	Carey McLeod	Jamaica	8.07 m (+0.5 m/s)	
6	Miltiadis Tentoglou	Greece	7.66 m (−0.2 m/s)	

==== Triple Jump ====
Qualification

Rank	Name	Nationality	Wins	Points
1	Jordan Scott	Jamaica	3	31
2	Hugues Fabrice Zango	Burkina Faso		18
3	Yasser Triki	Algeria		15
4	Pedro Pichardo	Portugal	1	15
5	Thomas Gogois	France		10
6	Max Heß	Germany		10
7	Donald Scott	United States		7
8	Andy Díaz	Italy		6
9	Zhu Yaming	China		6
10	Lázaro Martínez	Cuba		6
11	Ethan Olivier	Australia		6
12	Jonathan Seremes	France		5
13	Endiorass Kingley	Austria		3*
14	Su Wen	China		2
15	Almir dos Santos	Brazil		2
16	Russell Robinson	United States		1
17	Salif Mane	United States		1

Top 6 qualified as of right.
Athletes marked with * called up as reserves for Final

Final

Place	Athlete	Nation	Distance	Notes
	Andy Díaz	Italy	17.56 m (−0.3 m/s)	
2	Pedro Pichardo	Portugal	17.47 m (+0.4 m/s)	SB
3	Yasser Triki	Algeria	17.42 m (−0.3 m/s)	SB
4	Jordan Scott	Jamaica	17.16 m (+0.6 m/s)	
5	Almir dos Santos	Brazil	16.50 m (+0.5 m/s)	
6	Endiorass Kingley	Austria	16.36 m (−0.1 m/s)	

==== Shot Put ====
Qualification

Rank	Name	Nationality	Wins	Points
1	Joe Kovacs	United States	2	33
2	Payton Otterdahl	United States	2	25
3	Adrian Piperi	United States		24
4	Tom Walsh	New Zealand	1	22
5	Rajindra Campbell	Jamaica		21
6	Leonardo Fabbri	Italy		19
7	Chukwuebuka Enekwechi	Nigeria		13
8	Roger Steen	United States		12
9	Zane Weir	Italy		7
10	Jordan Geist	United States		4

Final

Place	Athlete	Nation	Distance	Notes
	Joe Kovacs	United States	22.46 m	
2	Payton Otterdahl	United States	22.07 m	
3	Rajindra Campbell	Jamaica	21.87 m	
4	Adrian Piperi	United States	21.84 m	
5	Tom Walsh	New Zealand	21.55 m	
6	Leonardo Fabbri	Italy	21.47 m	
7	Stefan Wieland	Switzerland	18.61 m	

Top 6 qualified as of right.

==== Discus Throw ====
Qualification

Rank	Name	Nationality	Wins	Points
1	Kristjan Čeh	Slovenia	1	27
2	Daniel Ståhl	Sweden		24
3	Matthew Denny	Australia	1	18
4	Mykolas Alekna	Lithuania	1	15
5	Henrik Janssen	Germany		15
6	Lawrence Okoye	Great Britain		11
7	Roje Stona	Jamaica		9
8	Ralford Mullings	Jamaica	1	8
9	Clemens Prüfer	Germany		6
10	Sam Mattis	United States		4
11	Fedrick Dacres	Jamaica		2
12	Claudio Romero	Chile		2
13	Lukas Weißhaidinger	Austria		1
14	Nicholas Percy	Great Britain		1

Final

Place	Athlete	Nation	Distance	Notes
	Mykolas Alekna	Lithuania	68.89 m	
2	Kristjan Čeh	Slovenia	67.18 m	
3	Rojé Stona	Jamaica	67.06 m	
4	Matthew Denny	Australia	66.62 m	
5	Daniel Ståhl	Sweden	66.47 m	
6	Henrik Janssen	Germany	66.37 m	

Top 6 qualified as of right.

==== Javelin Throw ====
Qualification

Rank	Name	Nationality	Wins	Points
1	Keshorn Walcott	Trinidad and Tobago		24
2	Julian Weber	Germany	2	23
3	Anderson Peters	Grenada		19
4	Neeraj Chopra	India	1	15
5	Julius Yego	Kenya	1	15
6	Andrian Mardare	Moldova		10
7	Oliver Helander	Finland		8
8	Luiz Mauricio da Silva	Brazil		6
9	Dawid Wegner	Poland		5
10	Edis Matusevicius	Lithuania		5
11	Cyprian Mrzygłód	Poland		4
12	Ahmed Sameh Mohamed Hussein	Egypt		4
13	Jakub Vadlejch	Czech Republic		2
14	Kishore Jena	India		1
15	Timothy Herman	Belgium		1
16	Remi Rougetet	France		1
17	Roderick Genki Dean	Japan		1

Top 6 qualified as of right.

Final

Place	Athlete	Nation	Distance	Notes
	Julian Weber	Germany	91.51 m	PB, WL
2	Neeraj Chopra	India	85.01 m	
3	Keshorn Walcott	Trinidad and Tobago	84.95 m	
4	Anderson Peters	Grenada	82.06 m	
5	Julius Yego	Kenya	82.01 m	
6	Andrian Mardare	Moldova	81.81 m	
7	Simon Wieland	Switzerland	81.29 m	PB

=== Women ===
==== 100 metres ====
Qualification

Rank	Name	Nationality	Wins	Points
1	Julien Alfred	Saint Lucia	3	31
2	Marie Josée Ta Lou-Smith	Ivory Coast		25
3	Maia McCoy	United States		25
4	Melissa Jefferson-Wooden	United States	3	24
5	Dina Asher-Smith	Great Britain	1	18
6	Tina Clayton	Jamaica		17
7	Jacious Sears	United States		17
8	Tia Clayton	Jamaica	1	15*
9	Patrizia van der Weken	Luxembourg		13*
10	Zoe Hobbs	New Zealand		12*
11	Daryll Neita	Great Britain		12
12	Sha'Carri Richardson	United States		10
13	Shelly-Ann Fraser-Pryce	Jamaica		10
14	Amy Hunt	Great Britain		9
15	Shericka Jackson	Jamaica	1	8
16	Favour Ofili	Nigeria		8
17	Aleia Hobbs	United States		5
18	Celera Barnes	United States		5
19	Thelma Davies	Liberia		4
20	Gina Lückenkemper	Germany		3
21	Cambrea Sturgis	United States		3
22	Twanisha Terry	United States		2
23	Julia Henriksson	Sweden		2
24	Delphine Nkansa	Belgium		2
25	Zaynab Dosso	Italy		2
26	Rani Rosius	Belgium		2
27	Ewa Swoboda	Poland		1
28	Boglárka Takács	Hungary		1
29	Deajah Stevens	United States		1
30	Mujinga Kambundji	Switzerland		1

Top 7 qualified as of right.
Athletes marked with * called up as reserves for Final

Final

Place	Athlete	Nation	Time	Notes
	Julien Alfred	Saint Lucia	10.76	
2	Tia Clayton	Jamaica	10.84	
3	Marie Josée Ta Lou-Smith	Ivory Coast	10.92	
4	Dina Asher-Smith	Great Britain	10.94	
5	Jacious Sears	United States	10.96	
6	Zoe Hobbs	New Zealand	11.09	
7	Maia McCoy	United States	11.14	
8	Salomé Kora	Switzerland	11.21	
9	Patrizia van der Weken	Luxembourg	11.26	
			Wind: (+0.3 m/s)	

==== 200 metres ====
Qualification

Rank	Name	Nationality	Wins	Points
1	Amy Hunt	Great Britain		34
2	Anavia Battle	United States	4	32
3	Brittany Brown	United States	1	19
4	Shericka Jackson	Jamaica	1	15
5	Dina Asher-Smith	Great Britain		14
6	McKenzie Long	United States		14
7	Favour Ofili	Nigeria		13
8	Marie Josée Ta Lou-Smith	Ivory Coast		12*
9	Rhasidat Adeleke	Ireland		12
10	Jenna Prandini	United States		12*
11	Daryll Neita	Great Britain		9
12	Jessika Gbai	Ivory Coast		9*
13	Julien Alfred	Saint Lucia	1	8
14	Jaël Bestué	Spain		7
15	Henriette Jæger	Norway		6
16	Marileidy Paulino	Dominican Republic		5
17	Deajah Stevens	United States		5
18	Chen Yujie	China		5
19	Maia McCoy	United States		4
20	Ashanti Moore	Jamaica		2
21	Audrey Leduc	Canada		2
22	Dalia Kaddari	Italy		2
23	Jessica-Bianca Wessolly	Germany		2
24	Li Yuting	China		2
25	Twanisha Terry	United States		2
26	Minke Bisschops	Netherlands		1
27	Helene Parisot	France		1
28	Torrie Lewis	Australia		1
29	Paula Sevilla	Spain		1
30	Léonie Pointet	Switzerland		1

Top 7 qualified as of right.
Athletes marked with * called up as reserves for Final

Final

Place	Athlete	Nation	Time	Notes
	Brittany Brown	United States	22.13	SB
2	Dina Asher-Smith	Great Britain	22.18	
3	Marie Josée Ta Lou-Smith	Ivory Coast	22.25	SB
4	Anavia Battle	United States	22.49	
5	Amy Hunt	Great Britain	22.61	
6	Jenna Prandini	United States	22.70	
7	Jessika Gbai	Ivory Coast	22.71	SB
8	McKenzie Long	United States	22.72	
			Wind: (−0.4 m/s)	

==== 400 metres ====
Qualification

Rank	Name	Nationality	Wins	Points
1	Lieke Klaver	Netherlands		29
2	Henriette Jæger	Norway	1	28
3	Salwa Eid Naser	Bahrain	1	26
4	Isabella Whittaker	United States	2	25
5	Marileidy Paulino	Dominican Republic	3	24
6	Natalia Bukowiecka	Poland		22
7	Amber Anning	Great Britain		21
8	Martina Weil	Chile		15*
9	Sada Williams	Barbados		9
10	Alexis Holmes	United States		8
11	Rhasidat Adeleke	Ireland		8
12	Aaliyah Butler	United States		7
13	Nickisha Pryce	Jamaica		6
14	Lynna Irby-Jackson	United States		5
15	Shafiqua Maloney	Saint Vincent and the Grenadines		4
16	Susanne Gogl-Walli	Austria		3
17	Paula Sevilla	Spain		2
18	Yemi Mary John	Great Britain		2
19	Britton Wilson	United States		2
20	Laviai Nielsen	Great Britain		2
21	Amandine Brossier	France		2
22	Andrea Miklós	Romania		1
23	Bakhita Jamal Saber Marisio	Qatar		1

Top 7 qualified as of right.
Athletes marked with * called up as reserves for Final

Final

Place	Athlete	Nation	Time	Notes
	Salwa Eid Naser	Bahrain	48.70	MR
2	Marileidy Paulino	Dominican Republic	49.23	
3	Henriette Jæger	Norway	49.49	NR
4	Martina Weil	Chile	49.72	NR
5	Amber Anning	Great Britain	49.75	SB
6	Isabella Whittaker	United States	49.99	
7	Lieke Klaver	Netherlands	50.23	
8	Natalia Bukowiecka	Poland	51.06	

==== 800 metres ====
Qualification

Rank	Name	Nationality	Wins	Points
1	Addison Wiley	United States		26
2	Tsige Duguma	Ethiopia	3	24
3	Halimah Nakaayi	Uganda		23
4	Prudence Sekgodiso	South Africa		23
5	Georgia Hunter Bell	Great Britain	2	22
6	Sarah Billings	Australia		17
7	Anaïs Bourgoin	France		16
8	Jemma Reekie	Great Britain		13
9	Audrey Werro	Switzerland		12*
10	Shafiqua Maloney	Saint Vincent and the Grenadines		12
11	Natoya Goule-Toppin	Jamaica		10
12	Faith Kipyegon	Kenya	1	8
13	Keely Hodgkinson	Great Britain	1	8
14	Nelly Chepchirchir	Kenya	1	8
15	Mary Moraa	Kenya		7
16	Claudia Hollingsworth	Australia		7
17	Abbey Caldwell	Australia		7
18	Sage Hurta-Klecker	United States		7
19	Oratile Nowe	Botswana		7
20	Jessica Hull	Australia		6
21	Sinclaire Johnson	United States		5
22	Assia Raziki	Morocco		3
22	Raevyn Rogers	United States		3
24	Nigist Getachew	Ethiopia		3
25	Habitam Alemu	Ethiopia		3
26	Carley Thomas	Australia		3
27	Eloisa Coiro	Italy		2
28	Rénelle Lamote	France		1
29	Worknesh Mesele	Ethiopia		1
30	Noélie Yarigo	Benin		1

Top 7 qualified as of right.
Athletes marked with * called up as reserves for Final

Final

Place	Athlete	Nation	Time	Notes
	Audrey Werro	Switzerland	1:55.91	NR
2	Georgia Hunter Bell	Great Britain	1:55.96	PB
3	Anaïs Bourgoin	France	1:56.97	PB
4	Shafiqua Maloney	Saint Vincent and the Grenadines	1:57.29	NR
5	Halimah Nakaayi	Uganda	1:58.43	
6	Prudence Sekgodiso	South Africa	1:58.57	
7	Sarah Billings	Australia	1:58.76	
8	Addison Wiley	United States	1:59.14	
—	Lisanne de Witte	Netherlands	DNF	PM

==== 1500 metres ====
Qualification

Rank	Name	Nationality	Wins	Points
1	Sarah Healy	Ireland	1	23
2	Nelly Chepchirchir	Kenya	2	22
3	Nikki Hiltz	United States	1	17
2	Gudaf Tsegay	Ethiopia	2	16
5	Linden Hall	Australia		15
6	Agathe Guillemot	France		15
7	Georgia Hunter Bell	Great Britain		14
8	Jessica Hull	Australia		13
9	Susan Ejore	Kenya		12
10	Faith Kipyegon	Kenya	1	8
11	Birke Haylom	Ethiopia		8*
12	Sinclaire Johnson	United States		8*
13	Diribe Welteji	Ethiopia		7
14	Beatrice Chebet	Kenya		7
15	Sarah Billings	Australia		7
16	Saron Berhe	Ethiopia		6
17	Heather Maclean	United States		6*
18	Marta Zenoni	Italy		6
19	Abbey Caldwell	Australia		6
20	Jemma Reekie	Great Britain		6
21	Laura Muir	Great Britain		5
22	Freweyni Hailu	Ethiopia		4
23	Worknesh Mesele	Ethiopia		4
24	Marta Pérez	Spain		3
25	Águeda Marqués	Spain		3
26	Elsabet Amare	Ethiopia		3
27	Esther Guerrero	Spain		2
28	Revee Walcott-Nolan	Great Britain		2
29	Teresia Muthoni Gateri	Kenya		2
30	Salomé Afonso	Portugal		1
31	Tigist Girma	Ethiopia		1

Top 10 qualified as of right.
Athletes marked with * called up as reserves for Final

Final

Place	Athlete	Nation	Time	Notes
	Nelly Chepchirchir	Kenya	3:56.99	SB
2	Jessica Hull	Australia	3:57.02	
3	Linden Hall	Australia	3:57.44	
4	Sinclaire Johnson	United States	3:57.80	
5	Heather MacLean	United States	3:59.43	
6	Susan Ejore	Kenya	3:59.48	
7	Birke Haylom	Ethiopia	3:59.70	
8	Sarah Healy	Ireland	3:59.90	
9	Agathe Guillemot	France	4:00.40	
10	Marta Zenoni	Italy	4:00.71	
11	Joceline Wind	Switzerland	4:08.37	
—	Catriona Bisset	Australia	DNF	PM

==== 5000 metres ====
Qualification

Rank	Name	Nationality	Wins	Points
1	Beatrice Chebet	Kenya	4	32
2	Gudaf Tsegay	Ethiopia		17
3	Agnes Ngetich	Kenya	1	15
4	Nadia Battocletti	Italy		13
5	Birke Haylom	Ethiopia		11
6	Aleshign Baweke	Ethiopia		11
7	Medina Eisa	Ethiopia	1	11
8	Likina Amebaw	Ethiopia		11
9	Hirut Meshesha	Ethiopia		10
10	Caroline Nyaga	Kenya		10
11	Josette Andrews	United States		8*
12	Fantaye Belayneh	Ethiopia		8*
13	Linden Hall	Australia	1	8
14	Freweyni Hailu	Ethiopia		7
15	Sarah Chelangat	Uganda		7
16	Rose Davies	Australia		6*
17	Sarah Healy	Ireland		6
18	Innes Fitzgerald	Great Britain		6
19	Margaret Akidor	Kenya		5
20	Fotyen Tesfay	Ethiopia		5
21	Marta García	Spain		5*
22	Ejgayehu Taye	Ethiopia		5
23	Hannah Nuttall	Great Britain		5*
24	Georgia Griffith	Australia		4*
25	Maureen Koster	Netherlands		4
26	Marta Alemayo	Ethiopia		4
27	Yenenesh Shimket	Ethiopia		4
28	Asayech Ayichew	Ethiopia		3
29	Hellen Ekalale Lobun	Kenya		3
30	Chaltu Dida	Ethiopia		2
31	Aynadis Mebratu	Ethiopia		2
32	Nozomi Tanaka	Japan		2
33	Águeda Marqués	Spain		2

Top 10 qualified as of right.
Athletes marked with * called up as reserves for Final

Final

Place	Athlete	Nation	Time	Notes
	Fantaye Belayneh	Ethiopia	8:40.56	
2	Josette Andrews	United States	8:40.95	
3	Likina Amebaw	Ethiopia	8:41.06	
4	Georgia Griffith	Australia	8:41.36	
5	Aleshign Baweke	Ethiopia	8:42.35	
6	Marta García	Spain	8:42.63	
7	Caroline Nyaga	Kenya	8:43.43	
8	Hannah Nuttall	Great Britain	8:44.74	
9	Rose Davies	Australia	8:46.11	
10	Hirut Meshesha	Ethiopia	8:52.48	
—	Salomé Afonso	Portugal	DNF	PM

==== 100 metres hurdles ====
Qualification

Rank	Name	Nationality	Wins	Points
1	Grace Stark	United States	3	35
2	Tobi Amusan	Nigeria		27
3	Nadine Visser	Netherlands	1	25
4	Masai Russell	United States	1	20
5	Ackera Nugent	Jamaica		20
6	Danielle Williams	Jamaica	1	20
7	Tonea Marshall	United States		14
8	Kendra Harrison	United States		13*
9	Ditaji Kambundji	Switzerland		13*
10	Devynne Charlton	Bahamas		12
11	Marione Fourie	South Africa		12
12	Megan Tapper	Jamaica	1	10
13	Pia Skrzyszowska	Poland		10
14	Alia Armstrong	United States		7
15	Alaysha Johnson	United States		6
16	Giada Carmassi	Italy		4
17	Wu Yanni	China		3
18	Liz Clay	Australia		1

Top 7 qualified as of right.
Athletes marked with * called up as reserves for Final

Final

Place	Athlete	Nation	Time	Notes
	Ackera Nugent	Jamaica	12.30	=SB
2	Ditaji Kambundji	Switzerland	12.40	=NR
3	Grace Stark	United States	12.40 [.434]	
4	Danielle Williams	Jamaica	12.40 [.440]	
5	Nadine Visser	Netherlands	12.45	
6	Tonea Marshall	United States	12.49	
7	Devynne Charlton	Bahamas	12.52	SB
8	Kendra Harrison	United States	12.72	
9	Selina von Jackowski	Switzerland	13.24	
			Wind: (−0.6 m/s)	

==== 400 metres hurdles ====
Qualification

Rank	Name	Nationality	Wins	Points
1	Femke Bol	Netherlands	5	40
2	Andrenette Knight	Jamaica	1	30
3	Gianna Woodruff	Panama		25
4	Ayomide Folorunso	Italy		25
5	Emma Zapletalová	Slovakia		23
6	Dalilah Muhammad	United States	1	22
7	Amalie Iuel	Norway		16
8	Anna Cockrell	United States	1	14
9	Jasmine Jones	United States		13
10	Rushell Clayton	Jamaica		11
11	Zenéy van der Walt	South Africa		9*
12	Naomi Van Den Broeck	Belgium		8*
13	Lina Nielsen	Great Britain		8
14	Shiann Salmon	Jamaica		6
15	Sarah Carli	Australia		6
16	Elena Kelety	Germany		5
17	Louise Maraval	France		4
18	Savannah Sutherland	Canada		3
19	Moa Granat	Sweden		3
21	Fatoumata Diallo	Portugal		3
21	Kemi Adekoya	Bahrain		2
22	Daniela Ledecká	Slovakia		2
23	Alexandra Stefania Uta	Romania		2
24	Andrea Rooth	Norway		2
25	Paulien Couckuyt	Belgium		1
26	Cassandra Tate	United States		1
27	Linda Olivieri	Italy		1
28	Anna Gryc	Poland		1
29	Janieve Russell	Jamaica		1
30	Anna Hall	United States		1

Top 7 qualified as of right.
Athletes marked with * called up as reserves for Final

Final

Place	Athlete	Nation	Time	Notes
	Femke Bol	Netherlands	52.18	MR
2	Emma Zapletalová	Slovakia	53.18	NR
3	Andrenette Knight	Jamaica	53.76	
4	Gianna Woodruff	Panama	54.24	
5	Naomi Van den Broeck	Belgium	54.83	
6	Amalie Iuel	Norway	55.34	
7	Ayomide Folorunso	Italy	55.77	
8	Zenéy van der Walt	South Africa	56.90	

==== 3000 metres steeplechase ====
Qualification

Rank	Name	Nationality	Wins	Points
1	Faith Cherotich	Kenya	3	31
2	Sembo Almayew	Ethiopia		23
3	Winfred Yavi	Bahrain	1	22
4	Peruth Chemutai	Uganda		15
5	Courtney Wayment	United States		11
6	Norah Jeruto	Kazakhstan		10
7	Marwa Bouzayani	Tunisia	1	10
8	Gabrielle Jennings	United States		9
9	Lea Meyer	Germany		8
10	Doris Lemngole	Kenya		7
11	Elise Thorner	Great Britain		7
12	Olivia Markezich	United States		6
13	Alemnat Walle	Ethiopia		5
14	Lomi Muleta	Ethiopia		4
15	Parul Chaudhary	India		3
16	Angelina Napoleon	United States		2
17	Kinga Królik	Poland		1
18	Kaylee Mitchell	United States		1
19	Alice Finot	France		1
20	Daisy Jepkemei	Kenya		1
21	Rihab Dhahri	Tunisia		1

Top 10 qualified as of right. Athletes marked with * called up as reserves for Final

Final

Place	Athlete	Nation	Time	Notes
	Faith Cherotich	Kenya	8:57.24	
2	Norah Jeruto	Kazakhstan	9:10.87	
3	Marwa Bouzayani	Tunisia	9:12.03	
4	Courtney Wayment	United States	9:14.91	
5	Gabrielle Jennings	United States	9:15.56	
6	Daisy Jepkemei	Kazakhstan	9:15.98	SB
7	Olivia Markezich	United States	9:22.20	
8	Lea Meyer	Germany	9:26.08	
9	Rihab Dhahri	Tunisia	9:51.96	
—	Kinga Królik	Poland	DNF	
—	Gesa Felicitas Krause	Germany	DNF	PM

==== High Jump ====
Qualification

Rank	Name	Nationality	Wins	Points
1	Nicola Olyslagers	Australia	3	37
2	Eleanor Patterson	Australia		36
3	Yaroslava Mahuchikh	Ukraine	2	35
4	Morgan Lake	Great Britain	1	23
5	Christina Honsel	Germany	1	23
6	Yuliya Levchenko	Ukraine		18
7	Maria Żodzik	Poland	1	14
8	Imke Onnen	Germany		12
9	Vashti Cunningham	United States		10
10	Angelina Topić	Serbia		6
11	Charity Hufnagel	United States		5
12	Engela Nilsson	Sweden		5
13	Elena Kulichenko	Cyprus		3
14	Lamara Distin	Jamaica		2
15	Tatiana Gkousin	Greece		1
16	Elisabeth Pihela	Estonia		1

Top 6 qualified as of right.

Final

Place	Athlete	Nation	Height	Notes
	Nicola Olyslagers	Australia	2.04 m	AR, WL
2	Yaroslava Mahuchikh	Ukraine	2.02 m	=SB
3	Morgan Lake	Great Britain	2.00 m	NR
4	Yuliya Levchenko	Ukraine	2.00 m	SB
5	Christina Honsel	Germany	1.97 m	
6	Eleanor Patterson	Australia	1.91 m	

==== Pole Vault ====
Qualification

Rank	Name	Nationality	Wins	Points
1	Katie Moon	United States	3	38
2	Sandi Morris	United States	2	29
3	Angelica Moser	Switzerland		27
4	Tina Šutej	Slovenia		27
5	Emily Grove	United States		24
6	Roberta Bruni	Italy		24
7	Gabriela Leon	United States		21
8	Molly Caudery	Great Britain	1	19
9	Amálie Švábíková	Czech Republic		17
10	Imogen Ayris	Australia		11
11	Marie-Julie Bonnin	France		10
12	Olivia McTaggart	Australia	1	8
13	Hana Moll	United States		6
14	Elien Vekemans	Belgium		1
15	Alysha Newman	Canada		1

Top 6 qualified as of right.

Final

Place	Athlete	Nation	Height	Notes
	Katie Moon	United States	4.82 m	
2	Sandi Morris	United States	4.75 m	
3	Emily Grove	United States	4.75 m	=PB
4	Angelica Moser	Switzerland	4.65 m	
5	Tina Šutej	Slovenia	4.65 m	
6	Roberta Bruni	Italy	4.45 m	
7	Lea Bachmann	Switzerland	4.30 m	

==== Long Jump ====
Qualification

Rank	Name	Nationality	Wins	Points
1	Malaika Mihambo	Germany	1	25
2	Claire Bryant	United States		21
3	Jasmine Moore	United States	1	19
4	Larissa Iapichino	Italy		17
5	Tara Davis-Woodhall	United States	2	16
6	Hilary Kpatcha	France		13
7	Annik Kälin	Switzerland		6*
8	Monae' Nichols	United States		5*
9	Lex Brown	United States		5
10	Ackelia Smith	Jamaica		5
11	Quanesha Burks	United States		5
12	Maja Åskag	Sweden		2
13	Jazmin Sawyers	United States		2
14	Ivana Španović	Serbia		2
15	Katarina Johnson-Thompson	Great Britain		1

Top 6 qualified as of right.
Athletes marked with * called up as reserves for Final

Final

Place	Athlete	Nation	Distance	Notes
	Larissa Iapichino	Italy	6.93 m (−1.1 m/s)	
2	Malaika Mihambo	Germany	6.92 m (+0.1 m/s)	
3	Hilary Kpatcha	France	6.75 m (−0.8 m/s)	
4	Claire Bryant	United States	6.66 m (−0.3 m/s)	
5	Annik Kälin	Switzerland	6.55 m (−0.8 m/s)	
6	Monae' Nichols	United States	6.45 m (±0.0 m/s)	

==== Triple Jump ====
Qualification

Rank	Name	Nationality	Wins	Points
1	Shanieka Ricketts	Jamaica	2	28
2	Leyanis Pérez Hernández	Cuba	2	23
3	Thea LaFond	Dominica		20
4	Jasmine Moore	United States		16
5	Liadagmis Povea	Cuba		14
6	Davisleydi Velazco	Cuba		7
7	Neja Filipič	Slovenia		7
8	Ilionis Guillaume	France		7
9	Ackelia Smith	Jamaica		5
10	Tuğba Danışmaz	Turkey		5
11	Diana Ana Maria Ion	Romania		3
12	Senni Salminen	Finland		3
13	Maja Åskag	Sweden		2
14	Ivana Španović	Serbia		2
15	Ilona Masson	Belgium		1
16	Ana Peleteiro-Compaoré	Spain		1

Top 6 qualified as of right.

Final

Place	Athlete	Nation	Distance	Notes
	Leyanis Pérez	Cuba	14.91 m (−0.5 m/s)	
2	Liadagmis Povea	Cuba	14.72 m (−0.6 m/s)	
3	Davisleydi Velazco	Cuba	14.65 m (−0.6 m/s)	
4	Thea LaFond	Dominica	14.62 m (+0.3 m/s)	SB
5	Shanieka Ricketts	Jamaica	14.35 m (−0.6 m/s)	
6	Jasmine Moore	United States	14.24 m (−0.2 m/s)	

==== Shot put ====
Qualification

Rank	Name	Nationality	Wins	Points
1	Chase Jackson	United States	3	38
2	Jessica Schilder	Netherlands	2	33
3	Sarah Mitton	Canada		29
4	Fanny Roos	Sweden		17
5	Maggie Ewen	United States		15
6	Jaida Ross	United States		11
7	Maddison-Lee Wesche	New Zealand		11
8	Yemisi Ogunleye	Germany		10
9	Gong Lijiao	China		7
10	Danniel Thomas-Dodd	Jamaica		4
11	Song Jiayuan	China		2
12	Abby Moore	United States		1
13	Jessica Inchude	Portugal		1

Top 6 qualified as of right.

Final

Place	Athlete	Nation	Distance	Notes
	Jessica Schilder	Netherlands	20.26 m	
2	Chase Jackson	United States	20.08 m	
3	Sarah Mitton (Note: Mitton was originally awarded the Diamond League title, however a protest was launched over her winning throw and after a review it was deemed a foul. Mitton was demoted to third place with Schilder becoming the champion.)	Canada	19.99 m	
4	Jaida Ross	United States	19.26 m	
5	Fanny Roos	Sweden	19.11 m	
6	Maggie Ewen	United States	18.45 m	
7	Miryam Mazenauer	Switzerland	16.91 m	

==== Discus Throw ====
Qualification

Rank	Name	Nationality	Wins	Points
1	Valarie Allman	United States	4	32
2	Yaime Pérez	Cuba		24
3	Jorinde van Klinken	Netherlands		23
4	Sandra Elkasević	Croatia		19
5	Feng Bin	China		11
6	Laulauga Tausaga	United States		10
7	Cierra Jackson	United States		7*
8	Marike Steinacker	Germany		6
9	Amanda Ngandu-Ntumba	France		3
10	Kristin Pudenz	Germany		2
11	Melina Robert-Michon	France		2
12	Daisy Osakue	Italy		2
13	Jayden Ulrich	United States		1
14	Vanessa Kamga	Sweden		1
15	Jiang Zhichao	China		1

Top 6 qualified as of right.
Athletes marked with * called up as reserves for Final

Final

Place	Athlete	Nation	Distance	Notes
	Valarie Allman	United States	69.18 m	
2	Jorinde van Klinken	Netherlands	67.15 m	SB
3	Yaime Pérez	Cuba	66.08 m	
4	Sandra Elkasević	Croatia	65.10 m	
5	Cierra Jackson	United States	64.40 m	
6	Laulauga Tausaga	United States	63.51 m	

==== Javelin Throw ====
Qualification

Rank	Name	Nationality	Wins	Points
1	Elina Tzengko	Greece	2	27
2	Jo-Ané du Plessis	South Africa		23
3	Adriana Vilagoš	Serbia	1	22
4	Haruka Kitaguchi	Japan	1	13
5	Mackenzie Little	Australia		10
6	Flor Ruiz	Colombia		8
7	Sigrid Borge	Norway		8
8	Dai Qianqian	China		7
9	Anete Sietina	Latvia		6
10	Maria Andrejczyk	Poland		6
11	Yan Ziyi	China		4
12	Marie-Therese Obst	Norway		3
13	Tori Moorby	Australia		2
14	Sara Kolak	Croatia		2
15	Maggie Malone-Hardin	United States		1
16	Yulenmis Aguilar	Spain		1
17	Victoria Hudson	Austria		1

Top 6 qualified as of right.

Final

Place	Athlete	Nation	Distance	Notes
	Elina Tzengko	Greece	64.57 m	
2	Adriana Vilagoš	Serbia	62.96 m	
3	Jo-Ané du Plessis	South Africa	62.26 m	
4	Mackenzie Little	Australia	61.96 m	SB
5	Flor Ruiz	Colombia	60.86 m	
6	Haruka Kitaguchi	Japan	60.72 m	

== Diamond+ Disciplines ==
Starting in 2025, each Diamond League meeting can nominate four “Diamond+ Disciplines” (two male and two female). These disciplines will offer higher levels of prize money, with the maximum for individual athletes rising from $10,000 to $20,000. In March 2025, the Diamond+ disciplines at the first four meetings were announced. More Diamond+ Disciplines were announced throughout the rest of the season.

Meeting	Men's disciplines	Women's disciplines
Xiamen	110 metres hurdles Pole vault	5000 metres High jump
Shanghai/Keqiao	100 metres 110 metres hurdles	200 metres Shot put
Doha	400 metres hurdles High jump	1500 metres Pole vault
Rabat	200 metres Shot put	100 metres 400 metres hurdles
Rome	100 metres High jump	1500 metres 5000 metres
Oslo	5000 metres Pole vault	100 metres 400 metres
Stockholm	200 metres 400 metres hurdles	100 metres 3000 metres
Paris	110 metres hurdles 400 metres hurdles	100 metres hurdles Pole vault
Eugene	100 metres Mile	800 metres Discus throw
Monaco	200 metres Pole vault	100 metres hurdles 400 metres hurdles
London	100 metres 1500 metres	800 metres Pole vault
Silesia	100 metres Pole vault	400 metres 100 metres hurdles
Lausanne	100 metres 800 metres	400 metres 100 metres hurdles
Brussels	3000 metres steeplechase Discus throw	5000 metres Pole vault
Zurich	100 metres 1500 metres 400 metres hurdles Pole vault	100 metres 3000 metres 100 metres hurdles Long jump
