= Nelly Chepchirchir =

Kenyan athlete

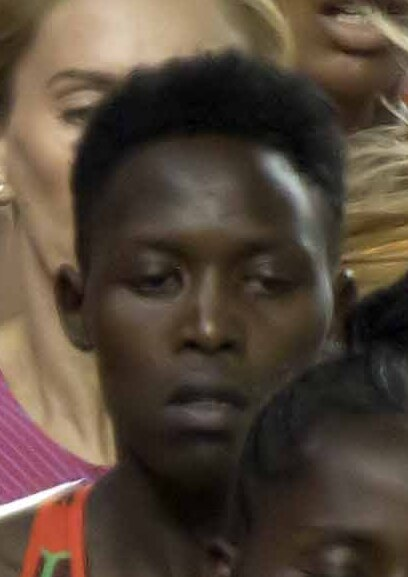
- Nelly Chepchirchir, in 2023

Personal information
- Nationality: Kenyan
- Born: 4 June 2003 (age 23) Kapsabet, Kenya

Sport
- Sport: Athletics
- Events: 800 m, 1500 m

Achievements and titles
- Personal bests: 800 m: 1:57.00 (Zagreb, 2024); 1000 m: 2:29.77 (Monaco, 2025); 1500 m: 3:55.25 (Tokyo, 2025)
Medal record
Women's athletics
Representing Kenya
Diamond League
First place	2025 Zurich	1500 m

Nelly Chepchirchir (born 4 June 2003) is a Kenyan middle-distance runner. She competed for Kenya at the 2023 World Athletics Championships and 2024 Olympic Games.

== Biography ==
Chepchirchir competed for Kenya at the 2022 World Athletics U20 Championships in Cali, Colonbia, where she qualified for the final of the 800 metres. In the final, she ran a new personal best time of 2:01.42 to finish in fourth place overall.

Chepchirchir ran a new personal best time of 1:58.23 for the 800 metres in Grosseto, Italy in May 2023. The following month, she set a new personal time best in the 1500 metres, running 3:58.96 in June 2023, in Hengelo, Netherlands. She won the 1500 metres title at the Kenyan national trials, running 3:59.77 in Nairobi, in July 2023. She then won the Gyulai Istvan Memorial, a World Athletics Continental Tour Gold event, in Szekesfehervar, Hungary in July 2023, running a time of 4:00.18 for the 1500 metres.

Selected for the 2023 World Athletics Championships in Budapest, she won her heat and her semi-final in the 1500m to qualify for the final. In the final, she ran a 3:57.90 personal best to finish fifth. The following week, she lowered her 1500m personal best again, running 3:56.72 whilst competing at the Diamond League in Xiamen, China.

In May 2024, she finished third in the 1500 metres at the 2024 Doha Diamond League. She competed in the 1500 metres at the 2024 Summer Olympics in Paris in August 2024, where she reached the semi-finals but did not progress to the final.

In May 2025, she won the 1500 metres race at the 2025 Doha Diamond League race in a time of 4:05.00. The following week, she also won the 1500 metres at the 2025 Meeting International Mohammed VI d'Athlétisme de Rabat and also won the 2025 Meeting de Paris in 3:57.02 in June 2025, both also part of the 2025 Diamond League. She won the 1000 metres at the 2025 Herculis event in Monaco, in 2:29.77, moving her to fourth place on the world all-time list. She ran 3:56.99 to win the 1500m at the Diamond League Final in Zurich on 28 August winning on the line from Jessica Hull.

She won at the Athletics Kenya World Championship Trials over 1500 metres. In September 2025, she was a finalist over 1500 metres at the 2025 World Championships in Tokyo, Japan, placing fourth in a personal best 3:55.25.

== Personal life ==
On 4 June 2026, Chepchirchir gave birth to a daughter, with her partner and fellow runner Emmanuel Wanyonyi.
