= 2023 Diamond League =

- Edition: 14th
- Dates: 5 May – 17 September
- Events: 32
- Meetings: 14
- Records set: 8

The 2023 Diamond League was the 14th season of the annual series of outdoor track and field meetings, organised by World Athletics. The number of Diamond Discipline events is 32, and the series ended with a single final at the Prefontaine Classic, the first time the Diamond League finals were hosted in the United States. Each meeting hosted a number of Diamond Discipline events according to allocation, most of which were broadcast in a two-hour TV window.

== Schedule ==
The following fourteen meetings were included in the 2023 season.

Leg	Date	Meet	Stadium	City	Country	Events (M+W)
1	5 May	Doha Diamond League	Suheim bin Hamad Stadium	Doha	Qatar	8 + 6 = 14
2	28 May	Meeting International Mohammed VI d'Athlétisme de Rabat	Prince Moulay Abdellah Stadium	Rabat	Morocco	7 + 7 = 14
3	2 June	Golden Gala Pietro Mennea	Stadio Luigi Ridolfi	Florence	Italy	7 + 8 = 15
4	9 June	Meeting de Paris	Stade Sébastien Charléty	Paris	France	6 + 9 = 15
5	15 June	Bislett Games	Bislett Stadium	Oslo	Norway	7 + 7 = 14
6	30 June	Athletissima	Stade Olympique de la Pontaise	Lausanne	Switzerland	7 + 8 = 15
7	2 July	Bauhausgalan	Stockholm Olympic Stadium	Stockholm	Sweden	8 + 6 = 14
8	16 July	Kamila Skolimowska Memorial	Stadion Śląski	Chorzów	Poland	7 + 8 = 15
9	21 July	Herculis EBS	Stade Louis II	Fontvieille	Monaco	8 + 6 = 14
10	23 July	London Athletics Meet	London Stadium	London	Great Britain	7 + 7 = 14
11	31 August	Weltklasse Zürich	Letzigrund	Zürich	Switzerland	8 + 7 = 15
12	2 September	Xiamen Diamond League	Xiamen Egret Stadium	Xiamen	China	6 + 7 = 13
13	8 September	Memorial Van Damme	King Baudouin Stadium	Brussels	Belgium	5 + 10 = 15
14	16–17 September	Prefontaine Classic	Hayward Field	Eugene	United States	16 + 16 = 32

Calendar changes
Diamond League Shanghai was cancelled before the season due to delay on renovation of Shanghai Stadium. It would return to the calendar in 2024.
On August 2, 2023, World Athletics signed a 10-year contract with the People's government of Xiamen to bring a second China meet to the calendar, replacing Shenzhen which was determined as the new stop before the COVID-19 pandemic.

== Winners by discipline ==
=== Men ===
==== Track ====
#	Meeting	100 m	200 m	400 m	800 m	1500 m	5000 m	110 m h	400 m h	3000 m st
1	Doha	–	Fred Kerley (USA); 19.92 SB	–	Slimane Moula (ALG); 1:46.06 SB	–	Lamecha Girma (ETH); 7:26.18 MR, WL (3000m)	–	Rai Benjamin (USA); 47.78	–
2	Rabat	Fred Kerley (USA); 9.94 MR	–	Steven Gardiner (BAH); 44.70	Emmanuel Wanyonyi (KEN); 1:44.36	Jakob Ingebrigtsen (NOR); 3:32.59 SB	–	Rasheed Broadbell (JAM); 13.08 MR, SB	–	Soufiane El Bakkali (MAR); 7:56.68 MR, WL, PB
3	Florence	Fred Kerley (USA); 9.94	Erriyon Knighton (USA); 19.89 SB	–	–	–	Mohamed Katir (ESP); 12:52.09 WL	Grant Holloway (USA); 13.04	CJ Allen (USA); 47.92	–
4	Paris	Noah Lyles (USA); 9.97	–	–	Emmanuel Wanyonyi (KEN); 1:43.27 WL, PB	–	–	Grant Holloway (USA); 12.98 WL	–	Lamecha Girma (ETH); 7:52.11 WR
5	Oslo	–	Erriyon Knighton (USA); 19.78 MR, SB	Wayde van Niekerk (RSA); 44.38	–	Jakob Ingebrigtsen (NOR); 3:27.95 AR, MR, WL, PB	Yomif Kejelcha (ETH); 12:41.73 MR, WL, PB	–	Karsten Warholm (NOR); 46.52 DLR, MR, WL	–
6	Lausanne	–	Letsile Tebogo (BOT); 20.01	–	–	Jakob Ingebrigtsen (NOR); 3:28.72 MR	Berihu Aregawi (ETH); 12:40.45 MR, WL, PB	Shunsuke Izumiya (JPN); 13.22	–	–
7	Stockholm	Akani Simbine (RSA); 10.03	–	Zakithi Nene (RSA); 45.30	Djamel Sedjati (ALG); 1:44.59	–	–	–	Karsten Warholm (NOR); 47.57	Soufiane El Bakkali (MAR); 8:09.94
8	Silesia	Akani Simbine (RSA); 9.97	–	Wayde van Niekerk (RSA); 44.08 MR, SB	–	Jakob Ingebrigtsen (NOR); 3:27.14 AR, MR, WL, PB	–	–	–	Soufiane El Bakkali (MAR); 8:03.16 MR
9	Monaco	Ferdinand Omanyala (KEN); 9.92	–	–	Wyclife Kinyamal (KEN); 1:43.22 WL	–	Hagos Gebrhiwet (ETH); 12:42.18 PB	–	Karsten Warholm (NOR); 46.51 DLR, MR, WL	Simon Kiprop Koech (KEN); 8:04.19 PB
10	London	–	Noah Lyles (USA); 19.46 MR, WL	Wayde van Niekerk (RSA); 44.36	–	Yared Nuguse (USA); 3:30.44	–	Grant Holloway (USA); 13.01	–	–
11	Zürich	–	Noah Lyles (USA); 19.80	–	–	Yared Nuguse (USA); 3:30.49	Yomif Kejelcha (ETH); 12:46.91	–	Kyron McMaster (IVB); 47.57	–
12	Xiamen	Christian Coleman (USA); 9.83 MR, =WL	–	Kirani James (GRN); 44.38 MR, SB	Emmanuel Wanyonyi (KEN); 1:43.20 MR, WL	–	–	Hansle Parchment (JAM); 12.96 MR, SB	–	Soufiane El Bakkali (MAR); 8:10.31 MR
13	Brussels	–	Kenneth Bednarek (USA); 19.79 SB	Rusheen McDonald (JAM); 44.84	Djamel Sedjati (ALG); 1:43.60	Jakob Ingebrigtsen (NOR); 4:43.13 WR (2000m)	–	–	–	–
14	Eugene; Final	Christian Coleman (USA); 9.83 =WL	Andre De Grasse (CAN); 19.76 SB	Kirani James (GRN); 44.30 SB	Emmanuel Wanyonyi (KEN); 1:42.80 MR, WL	Jakob Ingebrigtsen (NOR); 3:43.73 AR, DLR, MR, WL, PB (Mile)	Jakob Ingebrigtsen (NOR); 7:23.63 AR, DLR, MR, WL, PB (3000m)	Hansle Parchment (JAM); 12.93 WL, PB	Rai Benjamin (USA); 46.39 DLR, MR, WL	Simon Kiprop Koech (KEN); 8:06.26

==== Field ====
#	Meeting	Long jump	Triple jump	High jump	Pole vault	Shot put	Discus	Javelin
1	Doha	–	Pedro Pichardo (POR); 17.91 m SB	JuVaughn Harrison (USA); 2.32 m	–	–	Kristjan Čeh (SLO); 70.89 m MR, WL	Neeraj Chopra (IND); 88.67 m WL
2	Rabat	–	–	–	–	–	Kristjan Čeh (SLO); 70.32 m	–
3	Florence	–	Andy Díaz Hernández (CUB); 17.75 m NR	JuVaughn Harrison (USA); 2.32 m	–	Leonardo Fabbri (ITA); 21.73 m SB	–	–
4	Paris	Miltiadis Tentoglou (GRE); 8.13 m	–	–	–	–	–	–
5	Oslo	Simon Ehammer (SUI); 8.32 m SB	–	–	Armand Duplantis (SWE); 6.01 m	–	–	–
6	Lausanne	LaQuan Nairn (BAH); 8.11 SB	–	–	–	Ryan Crouser (USA); 22.29 m	–	Neeraj Chopra (IND); 87.66
7	Stockholm	–	–	Hamish Kerr (NZL); 2.24 m (7 ft 4 in)	Armand Duplantis (SWE); 6.05 m (19 ft 10 in)	–	Kristjan Čeh (SLO); 69.83 m (229 ft 1 in)	–
8	Silesia	–	–	Mutaz Essa Barshim (QAT); 2.36 m MR, WL	Armand Duplantis (SWE); 6.01 m	Ryan Crouser (USA); 22.55 m	–	–
9	Monaco	–	Hugues Fabrice Zango (BUR); 17.70 m	–	Christopher Nilsen (USA); 5.92 m =SB	–	–	Jakub Vadlejch (CZE); 85.95m
10	London	–	–	JuVaughn Harrison (USA); 2.35 m SB	–	Ryan Crouser (USA); 23.07 m MR	Daniel Ståhl (SWE); 67.03 m	–
11	Zürich	Miltiadis Tentoglou (GRE); 8.20 m	–	Mutaz Essa Barshim (QAT); 2.35 m	Armand Duplantis (SWE); 6.00 m	–	–	Jakub Vadlejch (CZE); 85.86m
12	Xiamen	–	Andy Díaz Hernández (ITA); 17.43 m MR	–	–	–	–	–
13	Brussels	–	–	–	Armand Duplantis (SWE); 6.10 m MR	–	–	–
14	Eugene; Final	Simon Ehammer (SUI); 8.22 m	Andy Díaz Hernández (ITA); 17.43 m	Sanghyeok Woo (KOR); 2.35 m =NR, =PB	Armand Duplantis (SWE); 6.23 m WR	Joe Kovacs (USA); 22.93 m SB	Matthew Denny (AUS); 68.43 m NR, PB	Jakub Vadlejch (CZE); 84.24m

=== Women ===
==== Track ====
#	Meeting	100 m	200 m	400 m	800 m	1500 m	5000 m	100 m h	400 m h	3000 m st
1	Doha	Sha'Carri Richardson (USA); 10.76 MR, WL	–	Marileidy Paulino (DOM); 50.51	–	Faith Kipyegon (KEN); 3:58.57 SB	–	Jasmine Camacho-Quinn (PUR); 12.48 SB	–	Winfred Yavi (BHR); 9:04.38 WL
2	Rabat	–	Shericka Jackson (JAM); 21.91 MR, SB	–	Mary Moraa (KEN); 1:58.72 SB	Gudaf Tsegay (ETH); 3:54.03 MR, WL	–	–	Shamier Little (USA); 53.95 SB	–
3	Florence	Marie-Josée Ta Lou (CIV); 10.97	–	Natalia Kaczmarek (POL); 50.41 SB	–	Faith Kipyegon (KEN); 3:49.11 WR	–	–	Femke Bol (NED); 52.43 MR, WL	Sembo Almayew (ETH); 9:00.71 MR, WL, PB
4	Paris	–	Gabrielle Thomas (USA); 22.05 SB	Marileidy Paulino (DOM); 49.12 MR	Keely Hodgkinson (GBR); 1:55.77 NR, WL, PB	–	Faith Kipyegon (KEN); 14:05.20 WR	–	–	–
5	Oslo	Marie-Josée Ta Lou (CIV); 10.75 MR, WL	–	–	–	Birke Haylom (ETH); 4:17.13 WU20R, MR, WL (Mile)	Beatrice Chebet (KEN); 8:25.01 MR, WL, PB (3000 m)	–	Femke Bol (NED); 52.30 MR, WL	–
6	Lausanne	Marie-Josée Ta Lou (CIV); 10.88	–	–	Mary Moraa (KEN); 1:57.43 SB	–	–	Jasmine Camacho-Quinn (PUR); 12.40	Femke Bol (NED); 52.76 MR	Beatrice Chepkoech (KEN); 9:05.98 MR, SB
7	Stockholm	–	Daryll Neita (GBR); 22.50	–	–	Freweyni Hailu (ETH); 4:02.31	Beatrice Chebet (KEN); 14:36.52 SB	Tobi Amusan (NGR); 12.52	–	–
8	Silesia	Sha'Carri Richardson (USA); 10.76	–	Natalia Kaczmarek (POL); 49.48 MR, PB	Mary Moraa (KEN); 1:56.85 MR, SB	–	Freweyni Hailu (ETH); 8:26.61 MR, SB (3000 m)	Tobi Amusan (NGR); 12.34 =MR, SB	–	–
9	Monaco	–	Shericka Jackson (JAM); 21.86	Natalia Kaczmarek (POL); 49.63	–	Faith Kipyegon (KEN); 4:07.64 WR (Mile)	–	Nia Ali (USA); 12.30 MR,WL, PB	–	–
10	London	Marie-Josée Ta Lou (CIV); 10.75 MR, =SB,	–	–	Jemma Reekie (GBR); 1:57.20 MR, SB	–	Gudaf Tsegay (ETH); 14:12.29 MR, PB	–	Femke Bol (NED); 51.45 AR, DLR, MR, WL, PB	Jackline Chepkoech (KEN); 8:57.35 MR, WL, PB
11	Zürich	Sha'Carri Richardson (USA); 10.88	Shericka Jackson (JAM); 21.82	–	Laura Muir (GBR); 1:57.71 SB	–	–	Danielle Williams (JAM); 12.54	–	Winfred Yavi (BHR); 9:03.19
12	Xiamen	–	–	Marileidy Paulino (DOM); 49.36 MR	–	Freweyni Hailu (ETH); 3:56.56 MR, SB	Beatrice Chebet (KEN); 8:24.05 WL, PB (3000 m) MR	–	Rushell Clayton (JAM); 53.56 MR	–
13	Brussels	Elaine Thompson-Herah (JAM); 10.84 SB	Shericka Jackson (JAM); 21.48 DLR, MR	Cynthia Bolingo (BEL); 50.09	–	Laura Muir (GBR); 3:55.34 SB	Lilian Kasait Rengeruk (KEN); 14:26.46	–	Femke Bol (NED); 52.11 MR	–
14	Eugene; Final	Shericka Jackson (JAM); 10.70	Shericka Jackson (JAM); 21.57 MR	Marileidy Paulino (DOM); 49.58	Athing Mu (USA)^{[a]} 1:54.97 NR, MR, WL, PB	Faith Kipyegon (KEN); 3:50.72 MR	Gudaf Tsegay (ETH); 14:00.21 WR	Tobi Amusan (NGR); 12.33 SB	Femke Bol (NED); 51.98 MR	Winfred Yavi (BHR); 8:50.66 AR, MR, WL, PB

==== Field ====
#	Meeting	Long jump	Triple jump	High jump	Pole vault	Shot put	Discus	Javelin
1	Doha	–	–	–	Katie Moon (USA); 4.81 m WL	–	–	–
2	Rabat	–	Leyanis Pérez Hernández (CUB); 14.84 m WL, PB	Yaroslava Mahuchikh (UKR); 2.01 m MR, WL	–	Auriol Dongmo (POR); 19.28 m SB	–	–
3	Florence	Larissa Iapichino (ITA); 6.79 m	–	–	Katie Moon (USA); 4.71 m	–	Valarie Allman (USA); 65.96 m SB	–
4	Paris	–	–	Nicola Olyslagers (AUS); 2.00 m SB	Nina Kennedy (AUS); 4.77 m SB	Auriol Dongmo (POR); 19.72 m SB	Valarie Allman (USA); 69.04 m MR	Haruka Kitaguchi (JPN); 65.09 m SB
5	Oslo	–	Yulimar Rojas (VEN); 14.91 m	–	–	Sarah Mitton (CAN); 19.54 m	Jorinde van Klinken (NED); 66.77m	–
6	Lausanne	–	–	Nicola Olyslagers (AUS); 2.02 m =AR, WL, =PB	Katie Moon (USA); 4.82 m WL	–	–	Mackenzie Little (AUS); 65.70 m PB
7	Stockholm	Larissa Iapichino (ITA); 6.69 m	–	–	–	–	Sandra Perkovic (CRO); 64.49 m	–
8	Silesia	–	Yulimar Rojas (VEN); 15.18 m MR, WL	Iryna Gerashchenko (UKR); 1.98 m MR	–	–	–	Haruka Kitaguchi (JPN); 67.04 m NR, MR, WL, PB
9	Monaco	Larissa Iapichino (ITA); 6.95 m PB	–	Nicola Olyslagers (AUS); 1.99 m	–	–	–	–
10	London	Quanesha Burks (USA); 6.98 m PB	–	–	Wilma Murto (FIN); 4.80 m SB	–	–	–
11	Zürich	–	Yulimar Rojas (VEN); 15.15 m	–	Nina Kennedy (AUS); 4.91 m MR, WL, PB	–	–	–
12	Xiamen	Ivana Vuleta (SRB); 6.88 MR	–	Yaroslava Mahuchikh (UKR); 2.02 m MR, =WL	–	–	Feng Bin (CHN); 67.41 m MR	–
13	Brussels	–	Shanieka Ricketts (JAM); 15.01 m PB	Yaroslava Mahuchikh (UKR); 2.00 m	–	Chase Ealey (USA); 20.05 m	–	Haruka Kitaguchi (JPN); 67.38 m NR, WL, PB
14	Eugene; Final	Ivana Vuleta (SRB); 6.85 m	Yulimar Rojas (VEN); 15.35 m WL	Yaroslava Mahuchikh (UKR); 2.03 m MR, WL	Katie Moon (USA); 4.86 m MR	Chase Ealey (USA); 20.76 m NR, MR, WL, PB	Valarie Allman (USA); 68.66 m	Haruka Kitaguchi (JPN); 63.78 m

== Results by stage ==
Doha Diamond League
5 May 2023
100 metres Women	Sha'Carri Richardson (USA)	10.76 MR, WL	Shericka Jackson (JAM)	10.85	Dina Asher-Smith (GBR)	10.98 SB
400 metres Women	Marileidy Paulino (DOM)	50.51	Shamier Little (USA)	50.84	Natalia Kaczmarek (POL)	51.64 SB
1500 metres/Mile Women	Faith Kipyegon (KEN)	3:58.57 WL	Diribe Welteji (ETH)	3:59.34 SB	Freweyni Hailu (ETH)	4:00.29 SB
3000 metres steeplechase Women	Winfred Yavi (BHR)	9:04.38 WL	Sembo Almayew (ETH)	9:05.83 PB	Faith Cherotich (KEN)	9:06.43 SB
100 metres hurdles Women	Jasmine Camacho-Quinn (PUR)	12.48 SB	Alaysha Johnson (USA)	12.66 SB	Nia Ali (USA)	12.69
Pole Vault Women	Katie Moon (USA)	4.81 m (15 ft 9 1/4 in) WL	Tina Šutej (SLO)	4.76 m (15 ft 7 1/4 in)	Sandi Morris (USA)	4.71 m (15 ft 5 1/4 in) SB
200 metres Men	Fred Kerley (USA)	19.92 SB	Kenny Bednarek (USA)	20.11 SB	Aaron Brown (CAN)	20.20
800 metres Men	Slimane Moula (ALG)	1:46.06 SB	Wyclife Kinyamal (KEN)	1:46.61	Djamel Sedjati (ALG)	1:46.97 SB
5000/3000 metres Men	Lamecha Girma (ETH)	7:26.18 MR, WL	Selemon Barega (ETH)	7:27.16 PB	Berihu Aregawi (ETH)	7:27.61 SB
400 metres hurdles Men	Rai Benjamin (USA)	47.78	CJ Allen (USA)	47.93 PB	Wilfried Happio (FRA)	49.12 SB
High Jump Men	JuVaughn Harrison (USA)	2.32 m (7 ft 7 1/4 in)	Woo Sang-hyeok (KOR)	2.27 m (7 ft 5 1/4 in) SB	Mutaz Essa Barshim (QAT)	2.24 m (7 ft 4 in) SB
Triple Jump Men	Pedro Pichardo (POR)	17.91 m (58 ft 9 in) SB	Hugues Fabrice Zango (BUR)	17.81 m (58 ft 5 in) WL	Andy Díaz (CUB)	17.80 m (58 ft 4 3/4 in)
Discus Men	Kristjan Čeh (SLO)	70.89 m (232 ft 6 3/4 in) MR, SB	Daniel Ståhl (SWE)	67.14 m (220 ft 3 1/4 in) SB	Sam Mattis (USA)	64.69 m (212 ft 2 3/4 in)
Javelin Men	Neeraj Chopra (IND)	88.67 m (290 ft 10 3/4 in) WL	Jakub Vadlejch (CZE)	88.63 m (290 ft 9 1/4 in) SB	Anderson Peters (GRN)	85.88 m (281 ft 9 in) SB
Rabat Diamond League
28 May 2023
200 metres Women	Shericka Jackson (JAM)	21.98 MR, SB	Anthonique Strachan (BAH)	22.15 PB	Tamari Davis (USA)	22.30 PB
800 metres Women	Mary Moraa (KEN)	1:58.72 SB	Catriona Bisset (AUS)	2:00.11	Sage Hurta (USA)	2:00.62 SB
1500 metres/Mile Women	Gudaf Tsegay (ETH)	3:54.03 MR, WL	Freweyni Hailu (ETH)	3:57.65 SB	Birke Haylom (ETH)	3:57.66 SB
400 metres hurdles Women	Shamier Little (USA)	53.95 SB	Rushell Clayton (JAM)	54.15 SB	Shiann Lachs (JAM)	54.42 SB
High Jump Women	Yaroslava Mahuchikh (UKR)	2.01 m (6 ft 7 in) MR, WL	Iryna Gerashchenko (UKR)	1.91 m (6 ft 3 in) SB	Nadezhda Dubovitskaya (KAZ)	1.87 m (6 ft 1 1/2 in) SB
Triple Jump Women	Leyanis Pérez (CUB)	14.84 m (48 ft 8 1/4 in) WL, PB	Maryna Bekh-Romanchuk (UKR)	14.65 m (48 ft 3/4 in) SB	Shanieka Ricketts (JAM)	14.53 m (47 ft 8 in)
Shot Put Women	Auriol Dongmo (POR)	19.28 m (63 ft 3 in) SB	Jessica Schilder (NED)	18.85 m (61 ft 10 in) SB	Jessica Woodard (USA)	18.65 m (61 ft 2 1/4 in)
100 metres Men	Fred Kerley (USA)	9.94 MR	Akani Simbine (RSA)	9.99	Ferdinand Omanyala (KEN)	10.05
400 metres Men	Steven Gardiner (BAH)	44.70	Vernon Norwood (USA)	45.11	Rusheen McDonald (JAM)	45.55
800 metres Men	Emmanuel Wanyonyi (KEN)	1:44.36	Wyclife Kinyamal (KEN)	1:44.73	Benjamin Robert (FRA)	1:45.04 SB
1500 metres/Mile Men	Jakob Ingebrigtsen (NOR)	3:32.59 SB	Yared Nuguse (USA)	3:33.02	Oliver Hoare (AUS)	3:33.39
3000 metres steeplechase Men	Soufiane El Bakkali (MAR)	7:56.68 MR, WL, PB	Getnet Wale (ETH)	8:05.15 PB	Abraham Kibiwot (KEN)	8:05.51 PB
110 metres hurdles Men	Rasheed Broadbell (JAM)	13.08 MR, SB	Grant Holloway (USA)	13.12	Hansle Parchment (JAM)	13.24 SB
Discus Men	Kristjan Čeh (SLO)	70.32 m (230 ft 8 1/2 in)	Daniel Ståhl (SWE)	69.21 m (227 ft 3/4 in) SB	Andrius Gudžius (LIT)	66.04 m (216 ft 8 in) SB
Florence Diamond League
2 June 2023
100 metres Women	Marie-Josée Ta Lou (CIV)	10.97	Gina Lückenkemper (GER)	11.09	Imani Lansiquot (GBR)	11.16
400 metres Women	Natalia Kaczmarek (POL)	50.41 SB	Lieke Klaver (NED)	50.75 SB	Lynna Irby (USA)	50.84
1500 metres/Mile Women	Faith Kipyegon (KEN)	3:49.11 WR	Laura Muir (GBR)	3:57.09 SB	Jessica Hull (AUS)	3:57.29 AR, PB
3000 metres steeplechase Women	Sembo Almayew (ETH)	9:00.71 MR, WL, PB	Jackline Chepkoech (KEN)	9:04.07 SB	Zerfe Wondemagegn (ETH)	9:04.61 PB
400 metres hurdles Women	Femke Bol (NED)	52.43 MR, WL	Shamier Little (USA)	53.38 SB	Anna Hall (USA)	54.42 PB
Pole Vault Women	Katie Moon (USA)	4.71 m (15 ft 5 1/4 in)	Tina Šutej (SLO)	4.71 m (15 ft 5 1/4 in)	Nina Kennedy (AUS)	4.61 m (15 ft 1 1/4 in) SB
Long Jump Women	Larissa Iapichino (ITA)	6.79 m (22 ft 3 1/4 in)	Tara Davis-Woodhall (USA)	6.74 m (22 ft 1 1/4 in)	Maryna Bekh-Romanchuk (UKR)	6.59 m (21 ft 7 1/4 in) SB
Discus Women	Valarie Allman (USA)	65.96 m (216 ft 4 3/4 in)	Feng Bin (CHN)	65.91 m (216 ft 2 3/4 in)	Shanice Craft (GER)	64.47 m (211 ft 6 in)
100 metres Men	Fred Kerley (USA)	9.94	Ferdinand Omanyala (KEN)	10.05	Trayvon Bromell (USA)	10.09 SB
200 metres Men	Erriyon Knighton (USA)	19.89 SB	Jereem Richards (TTO)	20.28	Aaron Brown (CAN)	20.31
5000/3000 metres Men	Mohamed Katir (ESP)	12:52.09 WL	Yomif Kejelcha (ETH)	12:52.12 SB	Luis Grijalva (GUA)	12:52.97 NR, PB
110 metres hurdles Men	Grant Holloway (USA)	13.04	Jason Joseph (SUI)	13.10 NR, PB	Devon Allen (USA)	13.19 SB
High Jump Men	JuVaughn Harrison (USA)	2.32 m (7 ft 7 1/4 in)	Woo Sang-hyeok (KOR)	2.30 m (7 ft 6 1/2 in)	Luis Enrique Zayas (CUB)	2.27 m (7 ft 5 1/4 in)
Triple Jump Men	Andy Díaz (CUB)	17.75 m (58 ft 2 3/4 in) NR of Italy	Hugues Fabrice Zango (BUR)	17.68 m (58 ft 0 in)	Lázaro Martínez (CUB)	17.12 m (56 ft 2 in) SB
Shot Put Men	Leonardo Fabbri (ITA)	21.73 m (71 ft 3 1/2 in) SB	Tom Walsh (NZL)	21.69 m (71 ft 1 3/4 in)	Tomáš Staněk (CZE)	21.64 m (70 ft 11 3/4 in)
Paris Diamond League
9 June 2023
200 metres Women	Gabrielle Thomas (USA)	22.05 SB	Abby Steiner (USA)	22.34	Marie-Josée Ta Lou (CIV)	22.34
400 metres Women	Marileidy Paulino (DOM)	49.12 MR	Sydney McLaughlin-Levrone (USA)	49.71 PB	Salwa Eid Naser (BHR)	49.95
800 metres Women	Keely Hodgkinson (GBR)	1:55.77 NR, WL, PB	Ajee Wilson (USA)	1:58.16 SB	Natoya Goule (JAM)	1:58.23 SB
5000/3000 metres Women	Faith Kipyegon (KEN)	14:05.20 WR	Letesenbet Gidey (ETH)	14:07.94 SB	Ejgayehu Taye (ETH)	14:13.31 SB
High Jump Women	Nicola Olyslagers (AUS)	2.00 m (6 ft 6 1/2 in) SB	Vashti Cunningham (USA)	1.97 m (6 ft 5 1/2 in)	Angelina Topić (SRB)	1.97 m (6 ft 5 1/2 in) NR, PB
Pole Vault Women	Nina Kennedy (AUS)	4.77 m (15 ft 7 3/4 in) SB	Margot Chevrier (FRA)	4.71 m (15 ft 5 1/4 in) PB	Katie Moon (USA)	4.71 m (15 ft 5 1/4 in)
Shot Put Women	Auriol Dongmo (POR)	19.72 m (64 ft 8 1/4 in) SB	Chase Ealey (USA)	19.43 m (63 ft 8 3/4 in)	Maggie Ewen (USA)	19.26 m (63 ft 2 1/4 in)
Discus Women	Valarie Allman (USA)	69.04 m (226 ft 6 in) MR	Sandra Perkovic (CRO)	65.18 m (213 ft 10 in) SB	Kristin Pudenz (GER)	62.87 m (206 ft 3 in)
Javelin Women	Haruka Kitaguchi (JPN)	65.09 m (213 ft 6 1/2 in) SB	Kelsey-Lee Barber (AUS)	62.54 m (205 ft 2 in) SB	Yulenmis Aguilar (CUB)	60.61 m (198 ft 10 in) SB
100 metres Men	Noah Lyles (USA)	9.97	Ferdinand Omanyala (KEN)	9.98	Letsile Tebogo (BOT)	10.05 SB
800 metres Men	Emmanuel Wanyonyi (KEN)	1:43.27 WL, PB	Marco Arop (CAN)	1:43.30 SB	Slimane Moula (ALG)	1:43.38 PB
3000 metres steeplechase Men	Lamecha Girma (ETH)	7:52.11 WR	Ryuji Miura (JPN)	8:09.91 NR, PB	Daniel Arce (ESP)	8:10.63 PB
110 metres hurdles Men	Grant Holloway (USA)	12.98 WL	Just Kwaou-Mathey (FRA)	13.09 PB	Jamal Britt (USA)	13.14 =SB
400 metres hurdles Men	CJ Allen (USA)	47.92	Wilfried Happio (FRA)	48.26 SB	Trevor Bassitt (USA)	48.28 SB
Long Jump Men	Miltiadis Tentoglou (GRE)	8.13 m (26 ft 8 in)	Simon Ehammer (SUI)	8.11 m (26 ft 7 1/4 in)	Murali Sreeshankar (IND)	8.09 m (26 ft 6 1/2 in)
Oslo Diamond League
15 June 2023
100 metres Women	Marie-Josée Ta Lou (CIV)	10.75 MR, WL	Anthonique Strachan (BAH)	10.92 PB	Shericka Jackson (JAM)	10.98
1500 metres/Mile Women	Birke Haylom (ETH)	4:17.13 WU20R, MR, WL	Cory McGee (USA)	4:18.11 PB	Jessica Hull (AUS)	4:18.24 AR, PB
5000/3000 metres Women	Beatrice Chebet (KEN)	8:25.01 MR, WL, PB	Lilian Kasait Rengeruk (KEN)	8:25.90 PB	Margaret Kipkemboi (KEN)	8:26.14 SB
400 metres hurdles Women	Femke Bol (NED)	52.30 MR, WL	Rushell Clayton (JAM)	53.84 SB	Gianna Woodruff (PAN)	54.46 SB
Triple Jump Women	Yulimar Rojas (VEN)	14.91 m (48 ft 11 in)	Leyanis Pérez (CUB)	14.87 m (48 ft 9 1/4 in) PB	Maryna Bekh-Romanchuk (UKR)	14.75 m (48 ft 4 1/2 in) SB
Shot Put Women	Sarah Mitton (CAN)	19.54 m (64 ft 1 1/4 in)	Maggie Ewen (USA)	19.52 m (64 ft 1/2 in)	Danniel Thomas-Dodd (JAM)	19.44 m (63 ft 9 1/4 in)
Discus Women	Jorinde van Klinken (NED)	66.77 m (219 ft 1/2 in)	Valarie Allman (USA)	66.18 m (217 ft 1 1/2 in)	Sandra Perkovic (CRO)	65.23 m (214 ft 0 in) SB
200 metres Men	Erriyon Knighton (USA)	19.78 MR, SB	Reynier Mena (CUB)	20.09	Joseph Fahnbulleh (LBR)	20.23
400 metres Men	Wayde van Niekerk (RSA)	44.38	Muzala Samukonga (ZAM)	44.49	Vernon Norwood (USA)	44.51 SB
1500 metres/Mile Men	Jakob Ingebrigtsen (NOR)	3:27.95 AR, MR, WL, PB,	Mohamed Katir (ESP)	3:28.89	Yared Nuguse (USA)	3:29.02 AR, PB
5000/3000 metres Men	Yomif Kejelcha (ETH)	12:41.73 MR, WL, PB	Jacob Kiplimo (UGA)	12:41.73 =MR, =WL, PB	Telahun Haile Bekele (ETH)	12:46.21 PB
400 metres hurdles Men	Karsten Warholm (NOR)	46.52 DLR, MR, WL	CJ Allen (USA)	47.58 PB	Wilfried Happio (FRA)	48.13
Pole Vault Men	Armand Duplantis (SWE)	6.01 m (19 ft 8 1/2 in)	Christopher Nilsen (USA)	5.91 m (19 ft 4 1/2 in)	Ernest John Obiena (PHI)	5.81 m (19 ft 1/2 in)
Long Jump Men	Simon Ehammer (SUI)	8.32 m (27 ft 3 1/2 in) SB	Marquis Dendy (USA)	8.26 m (27 ft 1 in)	Miltiadis Tentoglou (GRE)	8.21 m (26 ft 11 in)
Lausanne Diamond League
30 June 2023
100 metres Women	Marie-Josée Ta Lou (CIV)	10.88	Daryll Neita (GBR)	11.07	Gina Lückenkemper (GER)	11.17
800 metres Women	Mary Moraa (KEN)	1:57.43 SB	Keely Hodgkinson (GBR)	1:58.37	Natoya Goule (JAM)	1:58.90
3000 metres steeplechase Women	Beatrice Chepkoech (KEN)	9:05.98 MR, SB	Sembo Almayew (ETH)	9:06.82	Peruth Chemutai (UGA)	9:11.91 SB
100 metres hurdles Women	Jasmine Camacho-Quinn (PUR)	12.40	Tobi Amusan (NGR)	12.47 =SB	Tia Jones (USA)	12.51
400 metres hurdles Women	Femke Bol (NED)	52.76 MR	Viivi Lehikoinen (FIN)	54.67	Ayomide Folorunso (ITA)	55.12
High Jump Women	Nicola Olyslagers (AUS)	2.02 m (6 ft 7 1/2 in) =AR, WL, =PB	Iryna Gerashchenko (UKR)	2.00 m (6 ft 6 1/2 in) PB	Yaroslava Mahuchikh (UKR)	1.97 m (6 ft 5 1/2 in)
Pole Vault Women	Katie Moon (USA)	4.82 m (15 ft 9 3/4 in) WL	Wilma Murto (FIN)	4.77 m (15 ft 7 3/4 in) SB	Eliza McCartney (NZL)	4.71 m (15 ft 5 1/4 in)
Javelin Women	Mackenzie Little (AUS)	65.70 m (215 ft 6 1/2 in) PB	Haruka Kitaguchi (JPN)	63.34 m (207 ft 9 1/2 in)	Līna Mūze (LAT)	62.58 m (205 ft 3 3/4 in) SB
200 metres Men	Letsile Tebogo (BOT)	20.01	Jereem Richards (TTO)	20.11	Joseph Fahnbulleh (LBR)	20.21
1500 metres/Mile Men	Jakob Ingebrigtsen (NOR)	3:28.72 MR	Lamecha Girma (ETH)	3:29.51 NR, PB	Josh Kerr (GBR)	3:29.64 SB
5000/3000 metres Men	Berihu Aregawi (ETH)	12:40.45 MR, WL, PB	Joshua Cheptegei (UGA)	12:41.61	Hagos Gebrhiwet (ETH)	12:49.80
110 metres hurdles Men	Shunsuke Izumiya (JPN)	13.22	Jason Joseph (SUI)	13.23	Just Kwaou-Mathey (FRA)	13.37
Long Jump Men	LaQuan Nairn (BAH)	8.11 m (26 ft 7 1/4 in) SB	Miltiadis Tentoglou (GRE)	8.07 m (26 ft 5 1/2 in)	Yuki Hashioka (JPN)	7.98 m (26 ft 2 in)
Shot Put Men	Ryan Crouser (USA)	22.29 m (73 ft 1 1/2 in)	Tom Walsh (NZL)	21.99 m (72 ft 1 1/2 in)	Filip Mihaljević (CRO)	21.42 m (70 ft 3 1/4 in)
Javelin Men	Neeraj Chopra (IND)	87.66 m (287 ft 7 in)	Julian Weber (GER)	87.03 m (285 ft 6 1/4 in)	Jakub Vadlejch (CZE)	86.13 m (282 ft 6 3/4 in)
Stockholm Diamond League
2 July 2023
200 metres Women	Daryll Neita (GBR)	22.50	Dina Asher-Smith (GBR)	22.58	Jaël Bestué (ESP)	22.59
1500 metres/Mile Women	Freweyni Hailu (ETH)	4:02.31	Diribe Welteji (ETH)	4:02.79	Hirut Meshesha (ETH)	4:03.01
5000/3000 metres Women	Beatrice Chebet (KEN)	14:36.52 SB	Lemlem Hailu (ETH)	14:38.06	Medina Eisa (ETH)	14:40.02 PB
100 metres hurdles Women	Tobi Amusan (NGR)	12.52	Sarah Lavin (IRL)	12.73 PB	Pia Skrzyszowska (POL)	12.78
Long Jump Women	Larissa Iapichino (ITA)	6.69 m (21 ft 11 1/4 in)	Malaika Mihambo (GER)	6.66 m (21 ft 10 in) =SB	Ivana Vuleta (SRB)	6.58 m (21 ft 7 in)
Discus Women	Sandra Perkovic (CRO)	64.49 m (211 ft 6 3/4 in)	Jorinde van Klinken (NED)	62.96 m (206 ft 6 1/2 in)	Kristin Pudenz (GER)	62.33 m (204 ft 5 3/4 in)
100 metres Men	Akani Simbine (RSA)	10.03	Reece Prescod (GBR)	10.14	Joshua Hartmann (GER)	10.23
400 metres Men	Zakithi Nene (RSA)	45.30	Emmanuel Bamidele (NGR)	45.48	Matthew Hudson-Smith (GBR)	45.47
800 metres Men	Djamel Sedjati (ALG)	1:44.59	Saúl Ordóñez (ESP)	1:44.67 SB	Gabriel Tual (FRA)	1:44.85 SB
3000 metres steeplechase Men	Soufiane El Bakkali (MAR)	8:09.84	Getnet Wale (ETH)	8:12.27	Abrham Sime (ETH)	8:16.82
400 metres hurdles Men	Karsten Warholm (NOR)	47.57	Kyron McMaster (IVB)	48.94	Rasmus Mägi (EST)	49.04
High Jump Men	Hamish Kerr (NZL)	2.24 m (7 ft 4 in)	Thomas Carmoy (BEL)	2.20 m (7 ft 2 1/2 in)	Andrii Protsenko (UKR)	2.16 m (7 ft 1 in)
Pole Vault Men	Armand Duplantis (SWE)	6.05 m (19 ft 10 in)	Ernest John Obiena (PHI)	5.82 m (19 ft 1 in)	Pål Haugen Lillefosse (NOR)	5.72 m (18 ft 9 in) =SB
Discus Men	Kristjan Čeh (SLO)	69.83 m (229 ft 1 in)	Daniel Ståhl (SWE)	67.57 m (221 ft 8 in) SB	Andrius Gudžius (LIT)	67.19 m (220 ft 5 1/4 in) SB
Silesian Chorzów Diamond League
16 July 2023
100 metres Women	Sha'Carri Richardson (USA)	10.76	Shericka Jackson (JAM)	10.78	Ewa Swoboda (POL)	10.94 PB
400 metres Women	Natalia Kaczmarek (POL)	49.48 MR, PB	Lieke Klaver (NED)	49.81 PB	Marileidy Paulino (DOM)	50.00
800 metres Women	Mary Moraa (KEN)	1:56.85 MR, SB	Halimah Nakaayi (UGA)	1:57.78 NR, PB	Natoya Goule-Toppin (JAM)	1:57.90 SB
5000/3000 metres Women	Freweyni Hailu (ETH)	8:26.61 MR, SB	Lilian Kasait Rengeruk (KEN)	8:27.80	Lemlem Hailu (ETH)	8:29.43 PB
100 metres hurdles Women	Tobi Amusan (NGR)	12.34 =MR, SB	Kendra Harrison (USA)	12.35 =SB	Nia Ali (USA)	12.38
High Jump Women	Iryna Gerashchenko (UKR)	1.98 m (6 ft 5 3/4 in) MR	Nicola Olyslagers (AUS)	1.98 m (6 ft 5 3/4 in) =MR	Yuliya Levchenko (UKR)	1.98 m (6 ft 5 3/4 in) =MR,SB
Triple Jump Women	Yulimar Rojas (VEN)	14.91 m (48 ft 11 in) MR, WL	Maryna Bekh-Romanchuk (UKR)	14.70 m (48 ft 2 1/2 in)	Leyanis Pérez (CUB)	14.67 m (48 ft 1 1/2 in)
Javelin Women	Haruka Kitaguchi (JPN)	67.04 m (219 ft 11 1/4 in) NR, MR, WL, PB,	Mackenzie Little (AUS)	64.50 m (211 ft 7 1/4 in) PB	Tori Peeters (NZL)	62.73 m (205 ft 9 1/2 in) PB
100 metres Men	Akani Simbine (RSA)	9.97	Fred Kerley (USA)	9.98	Emmanuel Eseme (CMR)	9.98
400 metres Men	Wayde van Niekerk (RSA)	44.08 MR, SB	Bayapo Ndori (BOT)	44.61 =PB	Alison dos Santos (BRA)	44.73 SB
1500 metres/Mile Men	Jakob Ingebrigtsen (NOR)	3:27.14 AR, MR, WL, PB,	Abel Kipsang (KEN)	3:29.13 PB	Reynold Kipkorir Cheruiyot (KEN)	3:30.30 PB
3000 metres steeplechase Men	Soufiane El Bakkali (MAR)	8:03.16 MR	Abraham Kibiwot (KEN)	8:08.03	Leonard Bett (KEN)	8:09.45 SB
High Jump Men	Mutaz Essa Barshim (QAT)	2.36 m (7 ft 8 3/4 in) MR, WL	Gianmarco Tamberi (ITA)	2.34 m (7 ft 8 in) SB	Tobias Potye (GER)	2.34 m (7 ft 8 in) PB
Pole Vault Men	Armand Duplantis (SWE)	6.01 m (19 ft 8 1/2 in)	Sam Kendricks (USA)	5.91 m (19 ft 4 1/2 in) =SB	Christopher Nilsen (USA)	5.81 m (19 ft 1/2 in) PB
Shot Put Men	Ryan Crouser (USA)	22.55 m (73 ft 11 3/4 in)	Payton Otterdahl (USA)	21.88 m (71 ft 9 1/4 in)	Tom Walsh (NZL)	21.78 m (71 ft 5 1/4 in)
Monaco Diamond League
21 July 2023
200 metres Women	Shericka Jackson (JAM)	21.86	Julien Alfred (LCA)	22.08	Dina Asher-Smith (GBR)	22.23 SB
400 metres Women	Natalia Kaczmarek (POL)	49.63	Shamier Little (USA)	49.68 PB	Lieke Klaver (NED)	49.99
1500 metres/Mile Women	Faith Kipyegon (KEN)	4:07.64 WR	Ciara Mageean (IRL)	4:14.58 NR, PB	Freweyni Hailu (ETH)	4:14.79 PB
100 metres hurdles Women	Nia Ali (USA)	12.30 MR, WL, PB	Kendra Harrison (USA)	12.31 SB	Alaysha Johnson (USA)	12.39
High Jump Women	Nicola Olyslagers (AUS)	1.99 m (6 ft 6 1/4 in)	Iryna Gerashchenko (UKR)	1.96 m (6 ft 5 in)	Yaroslava Mahuchikh (UKR)	1.96 m (6 ft 5 in)
Long Jump Women	Larissa Iapichino (ITA)	6.95 m (22 ft 9 1/2 in) PB	Tara Davis-Woodhall (USA)	6.88 m (22 ft 6 3/4 in)	Ivana Vuleta (SRB)	6.86 m (22 ft 6 in) SB
100 metres Men	Ferdinand Omanyala (KEN)	9.92	Letsile Tebogo (BOT)	9.93 SB	Ackeem Blake (JAM)	10.00
800 metres Men	Wyclife Kinyamal (KEN)	1:43.22 WL	Slimane Moula (ALG)	1:43.40	Marco Arop (CAN)	1:43.51
5000/3000 metres Men	Hagos Gebrhiwet (ETH)	12:42.18 PB	Berihu Aregawi (ETH)	12:42.58	Telahun Haile Bekele (ETH)	12:42.70 PB
3000 metres steeplechase Men	Simon Kiprop Koech (KEN)	8:04.19 PB	Abraham Kibiwot (KEN)	8:09.54	Abrham Sime (ETH)	8:10.56 PB
400 metres hurdles Men	Karsten Warholm (NOR)	46.51 DLR, MR, WL	Alison dos Santos (BRA)	47.66 SB	CJ Allen (USA)	47.84
Pole Vault Men	Christopher Nilsen (USA)	5.92 m (19 ft 5 in) =SB	Ernest John Obiena (PHI)	5.82 m (19 ft 1 in)	Kurtis Marschall (AUS)	5.82 m (19 ft 1 in)
Triple Jump Men	Hugues Fabrice Zango (BUR)	17.70 m (58 ft 3/4 in)	Jaydon Hibbert (JAM)	17.66 m (57 ft 11 1/4 in)	Yasser Triki (ALG)	17.32 m (56 ft 9 3/4 in) SB
Javelin Men	Jakub Vadlejch (CZE)	85.95 m (281 ft 11 3/4 in)	Julian Weber (GER)	84.23 m (276 ft 4 in)	Keshorn Walcott (TTO)	81.31 m (266 ft 9 in)
London Diamond League
23 July 2023
100 metres Women	Marie-Josée Ta Lou (CIV)	10.75 MR, =SB	Dina Asher-Smith (GBR)	10.85 SB	Shericka Jackson (JAM)	10.94
800 metres Women	Jemma Reekie (GBR)	1:57.30 MR, SB	Natoya Goule-Toppin (JAM)	1:57.61 SB	Halimah Nakaayi (UGA)	1:57.62 NR, PB
5000/3000 metres Women	Gudaf Tsegay (ETH)	14:12.29 MR, PB	Beatrice Chebet (KEN)	14:12.92 PB	Sifan Hassan (NED)	14:13.42 AR, PB
3000 metres steeplechase Women	Jackline Chepkoech (KEN)	8:57.35 MR, WL, PB	Beatrice Chepkoech (KEN)	9:04.34 SB	Aimee Pratt (GBR)	9:16.10 SB
400 metres hurdles Women	Femke Bol (NED)	51.45 AR, DLR, MR, WL, PB	Janieve Russell (JAM)	53.75	Shamier Little (USA)	53.76
Pole Vault Women	Wilma Murto (FIN)	4.80 m (15 ft 8 3/4 in)	Katie Moon (USA)	4.80 m (15 ft 8 3/4 in)	Tina Šutej (SLO)	4.71 m (15 ft 5 1/4 in) SB
Long Jump Women	Quanesha Burks (USA)	6.98 m (22 ft 10 3/4 in)	Brooke Buschkuehl (AUS)	6.72 m (22 ft 1/2 in)	Tara Davis-Woodhall (USA)	6.72 m (22 ft 1/2 in)
200 metres Men	Noah Lyles (USA)	19.47 MR, WL	Letsile Tebogo (BOT)	19.50 AR, PB	Zharnel Hughes (GBR)	19.73 NR, PB
400 metres Men	Wayde van Niekerk (RSA)	44.36	Bryce Deadmon (USA)	44.40	Vernon Norwood (USA)	44.46
1500 metres/Mile Men	Yared Nuguse (USA)	3:30.34	Narve Gilje Nordås (NOR)	3:30.58	Neil Gourley (GBR)	3:30.60 PB
110 metres hurdles Men	Grant Holloway (USA)	13.01	Shunsuke Izumiya (JPN)	13.06	Jamal Britt (USA)	13.25
High Jump Men	JuVaughn Harrison (USA)	2.35 m (7 ft 8 1/2 in) SB	Mutaz Essa Barshim (QAT)	2.33 m (7 ft 7 1/2 in)	Thomas Carmoy (BEL)	2.27 m (7 ft 5 1/4 in)
Shot Put Men	Ryan Crouser (USA)	23.07 m (75 ft 8 1/4 in) MR	Tom Walsh (NZL)	22.58 m (74 ft 3/4 in) SB	Joe Kovacs (USA)	21.87 m (71 ft 9 in)
Discus Men	Daniel Ståhl (SWE)	67.03 m (219 ft 10 3/4 in)	Matthew Denny (AUS)	66.77 m (219 ft 1/2 in) SB	Kristjan Čeh (SLO)	66.02 m (216 ft 7 in)
Zürich Diamond League
31 August 2023
100 metres Women	Sha'Carri Richardson (USA)	10.88	Natasha Morrison (JAM)	11.00	Elaine Thompson-Herah (JAM)	11.00 SB
200 metres Women	Shericka Jackson (JAM)	21.82	Daryll Neita (GBR)	22.25	Kayla White (USA)	22.33
800 metres Women	Laura Muir (GBR)	1:57.71 SB	Catriona Bisset (AUS)	1:58.77	Adelle Tracey (JAM)	1:59.05
3000 metres steeplechase Women	Winfred Yavi (BHR)	9:03.19	Beatrice Chepkoech (KEN)	9:03.70	Faith Cherotich (KEN)	9:07.59
100 metres hurdles Women	Danielle Williams (JAM)	12.54	Alaysha Johnson (USA)	12.58	Kendra Harrison (USA)	12.59
Pole Vault Women	Nina Kennedy (AUS)	4.91 m (16 ft 1 1/4 in) MR, WL, PB	Katie Moon (USA)	4.81 m (15 ft 9 1/4 in)	Sandi Morris (USA)	4.76 m (15 ft 7 1/4 in) SB
Triple Jump Women	Yulimar Rojas (VEN)	15.15 m (49 ft 8 1/4 in)	Shanieka Ricketts (JAM)	14.78 m (48 ft 5 3/4 in)	Liadagmis Povea (CUB)	14.73 m (48 ft 3 3/4 in)
200 metres Men	Noah Lyles (USA)	19.80	Erriyon Knighton (USA)	19.87	Zharnel Hughes (GBR)	19.94
1500 metres/Mile Men	Yared Nuguse (USA)	3:30.49	Josh Kerr (GBR)	3:30.51	Abel Kipsang (KEN)	3:30.85
5000/3000 metres Men	Yomif Kejelcha (ETH)	12:46.91	Selemon Barega (ETH)	12:54.17 SB	Grant Fisher (USA)	12:54.49 SB
400 metres hurdles Men	Kyron McMaster (IVB)	47.27	Karsten Warholm (NOR)	47.30	Alison dos Santos (BRA)	47.62
High Jump Men	Mutaz Essa Barshim (QAT)	2.35 m (7 ft 8 1/2 in)	Hamish Kerr (NZL)	2.33 m (7 ft 7 1/2 in) NR, PB	Woo Sang-hyeok (KOR)	2.31 m (7 ft 6 3/4 in)
Pole Vault Men	Armand Duplantis (SWE)	6.00 m (19 ft 8 in)	Sam Kendricks (USA)	5.95 m (19 ft 6 1/4 in) SB	KC Lightfoot (USA)	5.85 m (19 ft 2 1/4 in)
Long Jump Men	Miltiadis Tentoglou (GRE)	8.20 m (26 ft 10 3/4 in)	Tajay Gayle (JAM)	8.07 m (26 ft 5 1/2 in)	Jarrion Lawson (USA)	8.05 m (26 ft 4 3/4 in)
Javelin Men	Jakub Vadlejch (CZE)	85.86 m (281 ft 8 1/4 in)	Neeraj Chopra (IND)	85.71 m (281 ft 2 1/4 in)	Julian Weber (GER)	85.04 m (279 ft 0 in)
Diamond League Xiamen
2 September 2023
400 metres Women	Marileidy Paulino (DOM)	49.36 MR	Candice McLeod (JAM)	50.19 =SB	Lynna Irby-Jackson (USA)	50.45
1500 metres/Mile Women	Freweyni Hailu (ETH)	3:56.56 MR, SB	Nelly Chepchirchir (KEN)	3:56.72 PB	Linden Hall (AUS)	3:57.92
5000/3000 metres Women	Beatrice Chebet (KEN)	8:24.05 MR, WL, PB	Laura Galván (MEX)	8:28.05 NR, PB	Margaret Akidor (KEN)	8:29.88 PB
400 metres hurdles Women	Rushell Clayton (JAM)	53.56 MR	Andrenette Knight (JAM)	53.87	Janieve Russell (JAM)	54.01
Long Jump Women	Ivana Vuleta (SRB)	6.88 m (22 ft 6 3/4 in) MR	Marthe Koala (BUR)	6.79 m (22 ft 3 1/4 in)	Ese Brume (NGR)	6.71 m (22 ft 0 in)
High Jump Women	Yaroslava Mahuchikh (UKR)	2.02 m (6 ft 7 1/2 in) MR, =WL	Lia Apostolovski (SLO)	1.92 m (6 ft 3 1/2 in)	Eleanor Patterson (AUS)	1.92 m (6 ft 3 1/2 in)
Discus Women	Feng Bin (CHN)	67.41 m (221 ft 1 3/4 in) MR	Sandra Perkovic (CRO)	67.32 m (220 ft 10 1/4 in) SB	Laulauga Tausaga (USA)	64.31 m (210 ft 11 3/4 in)
100 metres Men	Christian Coleman (USA)	9.83 MR, =WL	Kishane Thompson (JAM)	9.85 PB	Fred Kerley (USA)	9.96
400 metres Men	Kirani James (GRN)	44.38 MR, SB	Quincy Hall (USA)	44.38	Rusheen McDonald (JAM)	44.82
800 metres Men	Emmanuel Wanyonyi (KEN)	1:43.20 MR, WL, PB	Marco Arop (CAN)	1:43.24 PB	Benjamin Robert (FRA)	1:43.88
110 metres hurdles Men	Hansle Parchment (JAM)	12.96 MR, SB	Daniel Roberts (USA)	13.03	Grant Holloway (USA)	13.12
3000 metres steeplechase Men	Soufiane El Bakkali (MAR)	8:10.31 MR	Samuel Firewu (ETH)	8:11.29	Amos Serem (KEN)	8:14.41 SB
Triple Jump Men	Andy Díaz (ITA)	17.43 m (57 ft 2 in) MR	Hugues Fabrice Zango (BUR)	17.22 m (56 ft 5 3/4 in)	Donald Scott (USA)	16.65 m (54 ft 7 1/2 in) MR
Brussels Diamond League
8 September 2023
100 metres Women	Elaine Thompson-Herah (JAM)	10.84 SB	Natasha Morrison (JAM)	10.95 SB	Dina Asher-Smith (GBR)	10.97
200 metres Women	Shericka Jackson (JAM)	21.48 DLR, MR	Anthonique Strachan (BAH)	22.31	Jenna Prandini (USA)	22.47
400 metres Women	Cynthia Bolingo (BEL)	50.09	Lieke Klaver (NED)	50.16	Shamier Little (USA)	50.58
1500 metres Women	Laura Muir (GBR)	3:55.34 SB	Ciara Mageean (IRL)	3:55.87 NR, PB	Nelly Chepchirchir (KEN)	3:56.93
5000 metres Women	Lilian Rengeruk (KEN)	14:26.46	Medina Eisa (ETH)	14:28.94	Nozomi Tanaka (JPN)	14:29.18 NR, PB
400 metres hurdles Women	Femke Bol (NED)	52.11 MR	Janieve Russell (JAM)	53.80	Rushell Clayton (JAM)	54.10
High Jump Women	Yaroslava Mahuchikh (UKR)	2.00	Angelina Topić (SRB)	1.97 =NR, =PB	Eleanor Patterson (AUS)	1.94
Shot Put Women	Chase Ealey (USA)	20.05	Sarah Mitton (CAN)	19.76	Maggie Ewen (USA)	19.64
Javelin Women	Haruka Kitaguchi (JPN)	67.38 NR, WL, PB	Victoria Hudson (AUT)	64.65 SB	Lina Muze-Sirma (LAT)	63.00
Triple Jump Women	Shanieka Ricketts (JAM)	15.01 PB	Maryna Bekh-Romanchuk (UKR)	14.57	Thea Lafond (DMA)	14.49
200 metres Men	Kenneth Bednarek (USA)	19.79 SB	Zharnel Hughes (GBR)	19.82	Andre de Grasse (CAN)	19.89 SB
400 metres Men	Rusheen McDonald (JAM)	44.84	Alexander Ogando (DOM)	44.93 SB	Håvard Ingvaldsen (NOR)	45.07
800 metres Men	Djamel Sedjati (ALG)	1:43.60	Yanis Meziane (FRA)	1:43.94 PB	Tshepiso Masalela (BOT)	1:44.03 PB
2000 metres Men	Jakob Ingebrigtsen (NOR)	4:43.13 WR	Reynold Cheruiyot (KEN)	4:48.14 NR, SB	Stewart Mcsweyn (AUS)	4:48.77 AR, SB
Pole Vault Men	Armand Duplantis (SWE)	6.10 MR	Sam Kendricks (USA)	5.92	Ernest Obiena (PHI)	5.92
Eugene Diamond League Final
16–17 September 2023
100 metres Women	Shericka Jackson (JAM)	10.70	Marie-Josée Ta Lou (CIV)	10.75 =SB	Elaine Thompson-Herah (JAM)	10.79 SB
200 metres Women	Shericka Jackson (JAM)	21.57 MR	Marie-Josée Ta Lou (CIV)	22.10 SB	Anthonique Strachan (BAH)	22.16
400 metres Women	Marileidy Paulino (DOM)	49.58	Natalia Kaczmarek (POL)	50.38	Lieke Klaver (NED)	50.47
800 metres Women	Athing Mu (USA)^{[a]}	1:54.97 NR, MR, WL, PB	Keely Hodgkinson (GBR)	1:55.19 NR, PB	Natoya Goule-Toppin (JAM)	1:55.96 NR, PB
1500 metres Women	Faith Kipyegon (KEN)	3:50.72 MR	Diribe Welteji (ETH)	3:53.93 PB	Laura Muir (GBR)	3:55.16 SB
5000 metres Women	Gudaf Tsegay (ETH)	14:00.21 WR	Beatrice Chebet (KEN)	14:05.92 PB	Ejgayehu Taye (ETH)	14:21.52
100 metres hurdles Women	Tobi Amusan (NGR)	12.33 SB	Jasmine Camacho-Quinn (PUR)	12.38	Kendra Harrison (USA)	12.44
400 metres hurdles Women	Femke Bol (NED)	51.98 MR	Shamier Little (USA)	53.45	Rushell Clayton (JAM)	53.56
3000 metres steeplechase Women	Winfred Yavi (BHR)	8:50.66 AR, MR, WL, PB	Beatrice Chepkoech (KEN)	8:51.67 SB	Faith Cherotich (KEN)	8:59.65 PB
Long Jump Women	Ivana Vuleta (SRB)	6.85 m (22 ft 5 1/2 in)	Ese Brume (NGR)	6.85 m (22 ft 5 1/2 in) SB	Quanesha Burks (USA)	6.77 m (22 ft 2 1/2 in)
Triple Jump Women	Yulimar Rojas (VEN)	15.35 m (50 ft 4 1/4 in) MR, WL	Shanieka Ricketts (JAM)	15.03 m (49 ft 3 1/2 in) PB	Kimberly Williams (JAM)	14.61 m (47 ft 11 in)
High Jump Women	Yaroslava Mahuchikh (UKR)	2.03 m (6 ft 7 3/4 in) WL	Nicola Olyslagers (AUS)	2.03 m (6 ft 7 3/4 in) AR, =WL, PB	Angelina Topić (SRB)	1.95 m (6 ft 4 3/4 in)
Pole Vault Women	Katie Moon (USA)	4.86 m (15 ft 11 1/4 in) MR	Tina Šutej (SLO)	4.81 m (15 ft 9 1/4 in) PB	Sandi Morris (USA)	4.71 m (15 ft 5 1/4 in)
Shot Put Women	Chase Ealey (USA)	20.76 m (68 ft 1 1/4 in) NR, MR,WL, PB	Sarah Mitton (CAN)	19.94 m (65 ft 5 in)	Auriol Dongmo (POR)	19.92 m (65 ft 4 1/4 in) PB
Discus Women	Valarie Allman (USA)	68.66 m (225 ft 3 in)	Laulauga Tausaga (USA)	68.36 m (224 ft 3 1/4 in)	Sandra Perkovic (CRO)	66.85 m (219 ft 3 3/4 in)
Javelin Women	Haruka Kitaguchi (JPN)	63.78 m (209 ft 3 in)	Tori Peeters (NZL)	61.30 m (201 ft 1 1/4 in)	Mackenzie Little (AUS)	61.24 m (200 ft 11 in)
100 metres Men	Christian Coleman (USA)	9.83 =WL	Noah Lyles (USA)	9.85	Ferdinand Omanyala (KEN)	9.85
200 metres Men	Andre de Grasse (CAN)	19.76 SB	Kenneth Bednarek (USA)	19.95	Erriyon Knighton (USA)	19.97
400 metres Men	Kirani James (GRN)	44.30 SB	Quincy Hall (USA)	44.44	Vernon Norwood (USA)	44.61
800 metres Men	Emmanuel Wanyonyi (KEN)	1:42.80 MR, WL, PB	Marco Arop (CAN)	1:42.85 NR, PB	Djamel Sedjati (ALG)	1:43.06 PB
1500 metres/Mile Men	Jakob Ingebrigtsen (NOR)	3:43.73 AR, DLR, MR, WL, PB	Yared Nuguse (USA)	3:43.97 AR, PB	George Mills (GBR)	3:47.65 PB
5000/3000 metres Men	Jakob Ingebrigtsen (NOR)	7:23.63 AR, DLR, MR, WL, PB	Yomif Kejelcha (ETH)	7:23.64 NR, PB	Grant Fisher (USA)	7:25.47
110 metres hurdles Men	Hansle Parchment (JAM)	12.93 WL, PB	Grant Holloway (USA)	13.06	Daniel Roberts (USA)	13.07
400 metres hurdles Men	Rai Benjamin (USA)	46.39 DLR, MR, WL	Karsten Warholm (NOR)	46.53	Kyron McMaster (IVB)	47.31
3000 metres steeplechase Men	Simon Kiprop Koech (KEN)	8:06.26	Samuel Firewu (ETH)	8:10.74	George Beamish (NZL)	8:14.01
Long Jump Men	Simon Ehammer (SUI)	8.22 m (26 ft 11 1/2 in)	Tajay Gayle (JAM)	8.22 m (26 ft 11 1/2 in)	Yuki Hashioka (JPN)	8.15 m (26 ft 8 3/4 in) SB
Triple Jump Men	Andy Díaz Hernández (ITA)	17.43 m (57 ft 2 in)	Hugues Fabrice Zango (BUR)	17.25 m (56 ft 7 in)	Donald Scott (USA)	16.84 m (55 ft 2 3/4 in)
High Jump Men	Woo Sang-hyeok (KOR)	2.35 m (7 ft 8 1/2 in) =NR, =PB	Norbert Kobielski (POL)	2.33 m (7 ft 7 1/2 in) PB,	JuVaughn Harrison (USA)	2.33 m (7 ft 7 1/2 in)
Pole Vault Men	Armand Duplantis (SWE)	6.23 m (20 ft 5 1/4 in) WR	Ernest Obiena (PHI)	5.82 m (19 ft 1 in)	Sam Kendricks (USA)	5.72 m (18 ft 9 in)
Shot Put Men	Joe Kovacs (USA)	22.93 m (75 ft 2 3/4 in) SB	Ryan Crouser (USA)	22.91 m (75 ft 1 3/4 in)	Tom Walsh (NZL)	22.69 m (74 ft 5 1/4 in) SB
Discus Men	Matthew Denny (AUS)	68.43 m (224 ft 6 in) NR, PB	Kristjan Čeh (SLO)	67.64 m (221 ft 10 3/4 in)	Daniel Ståhl (SWE)	67.36 m (220 ft 11 3/4 in)
Javelin Men	Jakub Vadlejch (CZE)	84.24 m (276 ft 4 1/2 in)	Neeraj Chopra (IND)	83.80 m (274 ft 11 in)	Oliver Helander (FIN)	83.76 m (274 ft 9 1/2 in)

== Notes ==
^{a} Athing Mu received a national wild card into the final rendering her ineligible to win the Diamond League title, which went to runner-up Keely Hodgkinson.
