= 2025 Xiamen Diamond League =

Athletics meeting in Xiamen, China

- Dates: 26 April 2025
- Host city: Xiamen, China
- Venue: Xiamen Egret Stadium
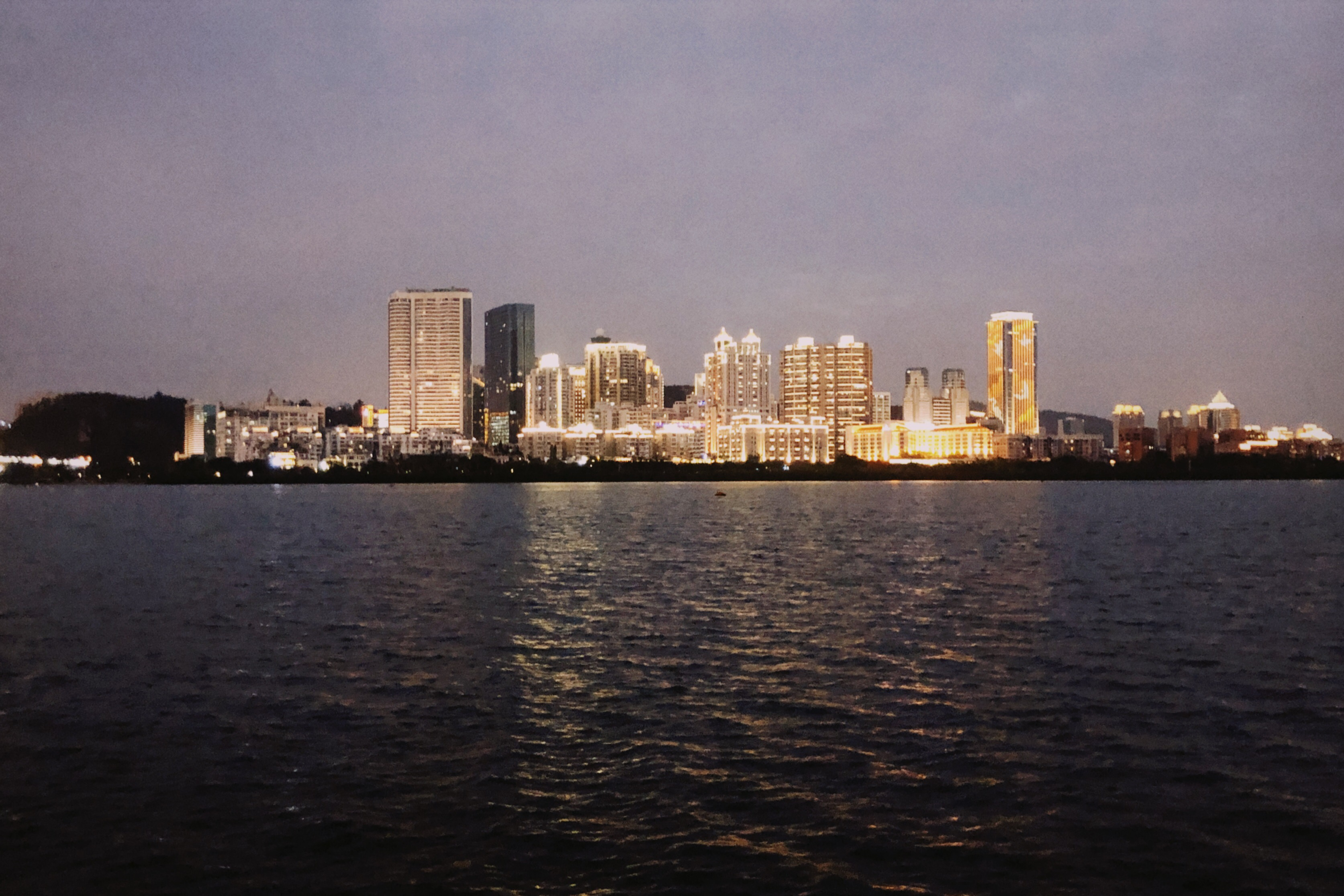
- Level: 2025 Diamond League

The 2025 Xiamen Diamond League was an outdoor track and field meeting in Xiamen, China. Held on 26 April at Xiamen Egret Stadium, it was the opening leg of the 2025 Diamond League – the highest level international track and field circuit.

== Diamond+ events results ==
Starting in 2025 a new discipline of events was added called Diamond+, these 4 events per meet awarded athletes with increased prize money whilst keeping the standard points format to qualify for the Diamond league finals. First place earns 8 points, with each step down in place earning one less point than the previous, until no points are awarded in 9th place or lower. In the case of a tie, each tying athlete earns the full amount of points for the place.

=== Men's ===
110 metres hurdles
Place	Athlete	Nation	Time	Points	Notes
1st place, gold medalist(s)	Cordell Tinch	United States	13.06	8	WL
2nd place, silver medalist(s)	Rachid Muratake	Japan	13.14	7	SB
3rd place, bronze medalist(s)	Liu Junxi	China	13.24	6	PB
4	Freddie Crittenden	United States	13.28	5	SB
5	Daniel Roberts	United States	13.35	4	SB
6	Enrique Llopis	Spain	13.36	3	SB
7	Xu Zhuoyi	China	13.37	2	SB
8	Shunsuke Izumiya	Japan	13.39	1	SB
9	Hansle Parchment	Jamaica	13.49		SB
10	Grant Holloway	United States	13.72		
			Wind: (+0.3 m/s)		

Pole vault
Place	Athlete	Nation	Height	Points	Notes
1st place, gold medalist(s)	Armand Duplantis	Sweden	5.92 m	8	
2nd place, silver medalist(s)	Emmanouil Karalis	Greece	5.82 m	7	
3rd place, bronze medalist(s)	Menno Vloon	Netherlands	5.82 m	6	
4	Ben Broeders	Belgium	5.72 m	5	
5	Ersu Şaşma	Turkey	5.72 m	4	
6	Kurtis Marschall	Australia	5.62 m	3	
7	EJ Obiena	Philippines	5.62 m	2	
8	Sam Kendricks	United States	5.62 m	1	
9	Li Chenyang	China	5.42 m		
10	Huang Bokai	China	5.42 m		

=== Women's ===
5000 metres
Place	Athlete	Nation	Time	Points	Notes
1st place, gold medalist(s)	Beatrice Chebet	Kenya	14:27.12	8	MR, WL
2nd place, silver medalist(s)	Gudaf Tsegay	Ethiopia	14:28.18	7	SB
3rd place, bronze medalist(s)	Birke Haylom	Ethiopia	14:28.80	6	SB
4	Hirut Meshesha	Ethiopia	14:29.29	5	PB
5	Likina Amebaw	Ethiopia	14:30.54	4	PB
6	Asayech Ayichew	Ethiopia	14:31.88	3	PB
7	Aynadis Mebratu	Ethiopia	14:32.58	2	SB
8	Caroline Nyaga	Kenya	14:33.24	1	SB
9	Rose Davies	Australia	14:40.83		AR
10	Sembo Almayew	Ethiopia	14:41.75		SB
11	Yenawa Nbret	Ethiopia	14:47.56		PB
12	Francine Niyomukunzi	Burundi	14:53.44		SB
13	Mariana Machado	Portugal	14:53.91		PB
14	Maudie Skyring	Australia	14:55.93		PB
15	Mekedes Alemeshete	Ethiopia	14:58.36		SB
16	Georgia Griffith	Australia	15:17.50		
—	Kiros Muaz	Ethiopia	DNF		PM
—	Winnie Nanyondo	Uganda	DNF		PM

High jump
Place	Athlete	Nation	Height	Points	Notes
1st place, gold medalist(s)	Yaroslava Mahuchikh	Ukraine	1.97 m	8	
2nd place, silver medalist(s)	Eleanor Patterson	Australia	1.94 m	7	
3rd place, bronze medalist(s)	Nicola Olyslagers	Australia	1.94 m	6	
4	Yuliya Levchenko	Ukraine	1.91 m	5	SB
5	Morgan Lake	Great Britain	1.91 m	4	
6	Christina Honsel	Germany	1.91 m	3	
7	Imke Onnen	Germany	1.91 m	2	
8	Tatiana Gusin	Greece	1.84 m	1	
9	Elisabeth Pihela	Estonia	1.84 m		
—	Ella Junnila	Finland	NM		

== Diamond events results ==
=== Men's ===
100 metres
Place	Athlete	Nation	Time	Points	Notes
1st place, gold medalist(s)	Akani Simbine	South Africa	9.99	8	
2nd place, silver medalist(s)	Ferdinand Omanyala	Kenya	10.13	7	
3rd place, bronze medalist(s)	Jeremiah Azu	Great Britain	10.17	6	SB
4	Christian Coleman	United States	10.18 [.175]	5	
5	Lachlan Kennedy	Australia	10.18 [.176]	4	
6	Emmanuel Eseme	Cameroon	10.19	3	SB
7	Letsile Tebogo	Botswana	10.20	2	SB
8	Xie Zhenye	China	10.23	1	SB
9	Rohan Watson	Jamaica	10.31		SB
10	Abdul Hakim Sani Brown	Japan	10.42		SB
			Wind: (+0.2 m/s)		

400 metres
Place	Athlete	Nation	Time	Points	Notes
1st place, gold medalist(s)	Bayapo Ndori	Botswana	44.25	8	MR, SB
2nd place, silver medalist(s)	Christopher Bailey	United States	44.27	7	PB
3rd place, bronze medalist(s)	Busang Kebinatshipi	Botswana	44.53	6	SB
4	Kirani James	Grenada	44.89	5	SB
5	Alexander Doom	Belgium	44.92	4	SB
6	Vernon Norwood	United States	45.03	3	
7	Lythe Pillay	South Africa	45.28	2	
8	Håvard Bentdal Ingvaldsen	Norway	45.33	1	SB
9	Ailixier Wumaier	China	46.15		SB

300 metres hurdles
Place	Athlete	Nation	Time	Points	Notes
1st place, gold medalist(s)	Karsten Warholm	Norway	33.05	8	WBP, DLR
2nd place, silver medalist(s)	Matheus Lima	Brazil	33.98	7	SB
3rd place, bronze medalist(s)	Ken Toyoda	Japan	34.22	6	SB
4	Berke Akçam	Turkey	34.50	5	PB
5	Carl Bengtström	Sweden	34.75	4	SB
6	Kyron McMaster	British Virgin Islands	34.95	3	SB
7	Xie Zhiyu	China	34.95	2	SB
8	CJ Allen	United States	34.96	1	PB
9	Gerald Drummond	Costa Rica	35.61		SB

3000 metres steeplechase
Place	Athlete	Nation	Time	Points	Notes
1st place, gold medalist(s)	Samuel Firewu	Ethiopia	8:05.61	8	MR, WL
2nd place, silver medalist(s)	Soufiane El Bakkali	Morocco	8:06.66	7	SB
3rd place, bronze medalist(s)	Simon Koech	Kenya	8:07.12	6	SB
4	Edmund Serem	Kenya	8:08.50	5	PB
5	Hailemariyam Amare	Ethiopia	8:09.95	4	SB, PM
6	Ryuji Miura	Japan	8:10.11	3	SB
7	Abraham Kibiwot	Kenya	8:10.13	2	SB
8	Samuel Duguna	Ethiopia	8:10.87	1	PB
9	Mohamed Amin Jhinaoui	Tunisia	8:11.18		SB
10	Daniel Arce	Spain	8:11.64		SB
11	Nicolas-Marie Daru	France	8:11.78		PB
12	Abrham Sime	Ethiopia	8:12.05		SB
13	Avinash Sable	India	8:22.59		SB
14	Leo Magnusson	Sweden	8:23.31		SB
15	Nahuel Carabaña	Andorra	8:30.59		SB
16	Mohamed Tindouft	Morocco	8:37.14		SB
—	Abderrafia Bouassel	Morocco	DNF		PM

Long jump
Place	Athlete	Nation	Distance	Points	Notes
1st place, gold medalist(s)	Zhang Mingkun	China	8.18 m (−0.5 m/s)	8	MR
2nd place, silver medalist(s)	Liam Adcock	Australia	8.15 m (−0.1 m/s)	7	
3rd place, bronze medalist(s)	Marquis Dendy	United States	8.10 m (+0.3 m/s)	6	SB
4	Shu Heng	China	8.08 m (−0.3 m/s)	5	
5	Wayne Pinnock	Jamaica	8.06 m (−0.5 m/s)	4	
6	Isaac Grimes	United States	7.96 m (+0.2 m/s)	3	
7	Bozhidar Sarâboyukov	Bulgaria	7.94 m (+1.0 m/s)	2	
8	Tajay Gayle	Jamaica	7.90 m (−0.3 m/s)	1	
9	Jeremiah Davis	United States	7.87 m (+0.9 m/s)		
10	Anvar Anvarov	Uzbekistan	7.87 m (+1.0 m/s)		SB

=== Women's ===
200 metres
Place	Athlete	Nation	Time	Points	Notes
1st place, gold medalist(s)	Anavia Battle	United States	22.41	8	MR, SB
2nd place, silver medalist(s)	Shericka Jackson	Jamaica	22.79	7	SB
3rd place, bronze medalist(s)	Jenna Prandini	United States	22.97	6	SB
4	Chen Yujie	China	22.99	5	SB
5	Amy Hunt	Great Britain	23.06	4	SB
6	Jessika Gbai	Ivory Coast	23.14	3	SB
7	Li Yuting	China	23.37	2	
8	Twanisha Terry	United States	23.50	1	SB
9	Mujinga Kambundji	Switzerland	23.51		SB
			Wind: (+0.4 m/s)		

1000 metres
Place	Athlete	Nation	Time	Points	Notes
1st place, gold medalist(s)	Faith Kipyegon	Kenya	2:29.21	8	MR, WL
2nd place, silver medalist(s)	Abbey Caldwell	Australia	2:32.94	7	AR
3rd place, bronze medalist(s)	Sarah Billings	Australia	2:33.45	6	PB
4	Sage Hurta-Klecker	United States	2:33.45	5	PB
5	Natoya Goule-Toppin	Jamaica	2:34.71	4	SB
6	Carley Thomas	Australia	2:35.06	3	PB
7	Habitam Alemu	Ethiopia	2:37.01	2	SB
8	Noélie Yarigo	Benin	2:39.16	1	SB
9	Bendere Oboya	Australia	2:41.83		SB
—	Halimah Nakaayi	Uganda	DNF		PM
—	Erin Wallace	Great Britain	DNF		PM

100 metres hurdles
Place	Athlete	Nation	Time	Points	Notes
1st place, gold medalist(s)	Danielle Williams	Jamaica	12.53	8	SB
2nd place, silver medalist(s)	Grace Stark	United States	12.58	7	
3rd place, bronze medalist(s)	Marione Fourie	South Africa	12.62	6	SB
4	Tobi Amusan	Nigeria	12.74	5	SB
5	Pia Skrzyszowska	Poland	12.81	4	SB
6	Tonea Marshall	United States	12.92	3	
7	Wu Yanni	China	13.00	2	SB
8	Liz Clay	Australia	13.19	1	
9	Nia Ali	United States	13.23		SB
—	Devynne Charlton	Bahamas	DNF		
			Wind: (−0.2 m/s)		

Shot put
Place	Athlete	Nation	Distance	Points	Notes
1st place, gold medalist(s)	Jessica Schilder	Netherlands	20.47 m	8	MR
2nd place, silver medalist(s)	Chase Jackson	United States	20.31 m	7	SB
3rd place, bronze medalist(s)	Gong Lijao	China	19.62 m	6	SB
4	Maddison-Lee Wesche	New Zealand	19.51 m	5	SB
5	Sarah Mitton	Canada	19.23 m	4	
6	Maggie Ewen	United States	19.04 m	3	
7	Fanny Roos	Sweden	18.66 m	2	
8	Jessica Inchude	Portugal	18.07 m	1	
9	Song Jiayuan	China	17.92 m		SB
10	Jaida Ross	United States	17.65 m		

Discus throw
Place	Athlete	Nation	Distance	Points	Notes
1st place, gold medalist(s)	Valarie Allman	United States	68.95 m	8	
2nd place, silver medalist(s)	Yaime Pérez	Cuba	66.26 m	7	
3rd place, bronze medalist(s)	Laulauga Tausaga	United States	64.91 m	6	
4	Jorinde van Klinken	Netherlands	64.79 m	5	SB
5	Feng Bin	China	64.17 m	4	SB
6	Sandra Elkasević	Croatia	63.55 m	3	SB
7	Daisy Osakue	Italy	60.25 m	2	
8	Jiang Zhichao	China	60.10 m	1	SB
9	Vanessa Kamga	Sweden	59.88 m		

== Promotional events results ==
=== Men's ===
Triple jump
Place	Athlete	Nation	Distance	Notes
1st place, gold medalist(s)	Jordan Scott	Jamaica	17.27 m (+0.9 m/s)	PB
2nd place, silver medalist(s)	Zhu Yaming	China	17.03 m (+1.3 m/s)	
3rd place, bronze medalist(s)	Donald Scott	United States	16.85 m (+1.2 m/s)	SB
4	Su Wen	China	16.78 m (+0.6 m/s)	
5	Ethan Olivier	New Zealand	16.52 m (+0.6 m/s)	
6	Connor Murphy	Australia	16.50 m (+1.4 m/s)	
7	Salif Mane	United States	16.44 m (−0.6 m/s)	SB
8	Hugues Fabrice Zango	Burkina Faso	16.41 m (+1.0 m/s)	
9	Tiago Pereira	Portugal	15.87 m (+1.0 m/s)	

=== Women's ===
Javelin throw
Place	Athlete	Nation	Distance	Notes
1st place, gold medalist(s)	Elina Tzengko	Greece	64.75 m	MR, SB
2nd place, silver medalist(s)	Tori Moorby	New Zealand	62.50 m	SB
3rd place, bronze medalist(s)	Su Lingdan	China	61.62 m	SB
4	Dai Qianqian	China	61.47 m	SB
5	Marie-Therese Obst	Norway	60.91 m	SB
6	Jo-Ané van Dyk	South Africa	60.38 m	
7	Yulenmis Aguilar	Spain	58.80 m	SB
8	Liveta Jasiūnaitė	Lithuania	58.33 m	SB
9	Yu Yuzhen	China	52.86 m	SB

== National events results ==
=== Men's ===
100 metres
Rank	Athlete	Nation	Time	Notes
Heat 1
1st place, gold medalist(s)	Zhang Tao	China	10.55	
2nd place, silver medalist(s)	Chen Zhu Yu	China	10.95	
3rd place, bronze medalist(s)	Wang Xiaoyan	China	11.01	
4	Aiertamu Aizihaer	China	11.03	
5	Cui Kunlun	China	11.06	
6	Liu Dian	China	11.33	
7	Bu Yunhan	China	11.43	
8	Hu Zhenyu	China	11.45	
9	Liu Syuan	China	11.56	
10	Liu Renyuan	China	11.97	
			Wind: (+0.5 m/s)	
Heat 2
1st place, gold medalist(s)	Chen Yuhui	China	10.79	
2nd place, silver medalist(s)	Chen Peirong	China	10.92 [.911]	
3rd place, bronze medalist(s)	Zhemg Yongyuan	China	10.92 [.914]	
4	Zeng Zhihan	China	10.98	
5	Fang Haoyang	China	11.04	
6	Zhang Zhen	China	11.14	
7	Xie Chengqi	China	11.35	
8	Kuang Yiqian	China	11.41	
9	Zhang Chenshuo	China	12.19	
			Wind: (+0.3 m/s)	

3000 metres
Place	Athlete	Nation	Time	Notes
1st place, gold medalist(s)	Xie Mingjie	China	8:47.31	MR
2nd place, silver medalist(s)	Zhan Zhao	China	8:53.26	
3rd place, bronze medalist(s)	Jian Ping	China	8:54.30	
4	Zhang Wenzhui	China	8:55.82	
5	Ye Zhilong	China	9:01.75	
6	Wang Xiaokan	China	9:22.17	
7	Zhang Tangzhi	China	9:27.99	
8	Ye Jiajun	China	9:30.02	
9	Li Yanjiang	China	9:31.47	
10	Chen Bolong	China	9:33.91	
11	Zhou Zhiheng	China	9:37.84	
12	Zhang Lijan	China	9:56.55	
13	Chen Zehang	China	10:11.83	
14	Wang Chenye	China	10:32.02	
15	Chen Weijie	China	10:32.94	
16	Liu Dazhuang	China	10:38.55	
17	Chen Yitian	China	10:51.78	

300 metres hurdles
Place	Athlete	Nation	Time	Notes
1st place, gold medalist(s)	Cai Yuchen	China	36.84	
2nd place, silver medalist(s)	Chen Yuheng	China	38.78	
3rd place, bronze medalist(s)	Huang Zhanjie	China	39.87	
4	Yang Shurui	China	40.59	
5	Wu Zesong	China	41.91	
6	Liu Donghui	China	42.23	
7	Chen Zhengmao	China	42.63	
8	Wang Zhenzhu	China	44.25	
9	Chen Zhen	China	46.10	

=== Women's ===
100 metres
Place	Athlete	Nation	Time	Notes
1st place, gold medalist(s)	Sun Yuxuan	China	12.45	
2nd place, silver medalist(s)	Chen Xinyue	China	12.56	
3rd place, bronze medalist(s)	He Ziyan	China	12.69	
4	Yu Mingyi	China	12.71	
5	Yang Xinye	China	12.80 [.792]	
6	Sun Han	China	12.80 [.795]	
7	Kar Yee Ng	Malaysia	13.50	
8	Chen Yuan	China	13.69	
9	Chen Ziye	China	13.71	
			Wind: (+0.4 m/s)	

3000 metres
Place	Athlete	Nation	Time	Notes
1st place, gold medalist(s)	Huang Xuemei	China	9:30.64	
2nd place, silver medalist(s)	Zhuang Yanan	China	10:13.79	
3rd place, bronze medalist(s)	Wei Yixin	China	10:42.22	
4	Wang Xiaoling	China	11:29.31	
5	Luo Yu	China	11:51.64	
6	Kang Xiaoyu	China	11:59.56	
—	Chen Anqi	China	DNF	

== See also ==
- 2025 Diamond League
