= 2023 Xiamen Diamond League =

Athletics meeting in Xiamen, China

- Dates: 2 September 2023
- Host city: Xiamen, China
- Venue: Xiamen Egret Stadium
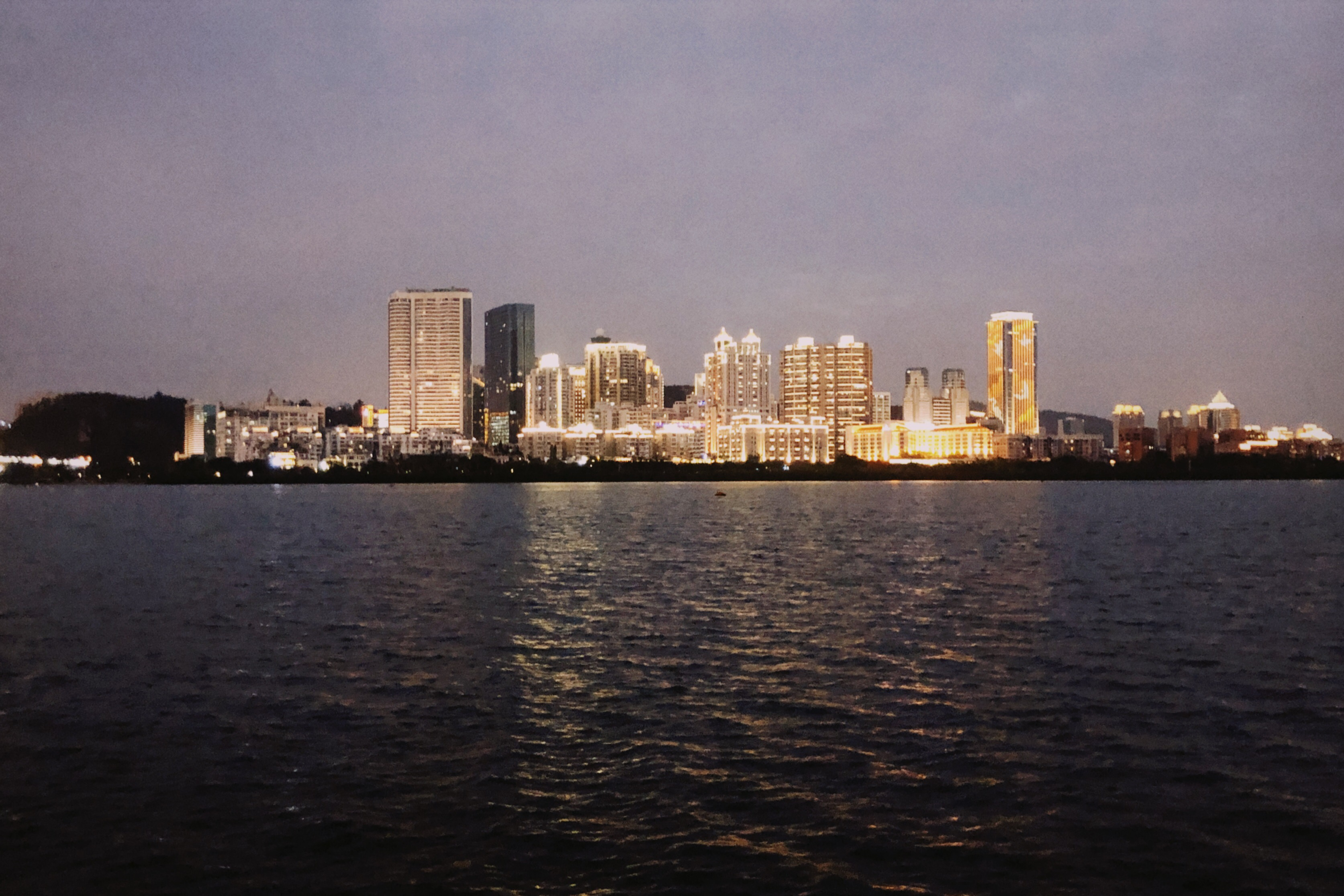
- Level: 2023 Diamond League

The 2023 Xiamen Diamond League was an outdoor track and field meeting in Xiamen, China. Held on 2 September 2023 at Xiamen Egret Stadium, it was the 12th leg of the 2023 Diamond League – the highest level international track and field circuit.

The meeting marked the Diamond League's first return to China since 2019, before the COVID-19 pandemic. It was also the first meeting held at the US$1.2 billion Xiamen Egret Stadium.

== Results ==
Athletes competing in the Diamond League disciplines earned extra compensation and points which went towards qualifying for the 2023 Diamond League finals. First place earned 8 points, with each step down in place earning one less point than the previous, until no points are awarded in 9th place or lower.

=== Diamond Discipline ===
Men's 100m (+0.4 m/s)
Place	Athlete	Country	Time	Points
1st place, gold medalist(s)	Christian Coleman	United States	9.83	8
2nd place, silver medalist(s)	Kishane Thompson	Jamaica	9.85	7
3rd place, bronze medalist(s)	Fred Kerley	United States	9.96	6
4	Brandon Carnes	United States	10.01	5
5	Yohan Blake	Jamaica	10.04	3
6	Marcell Jacobs	Italy	10.05	2
7	Xie Zhenye	China	10.12	1
8	Rohan Watson	Jamaica	10.18	
9	Ackeem Blake	Jamaica	25.13	
	Marvin Bracy	United States	~~10.02~~ DSQ	~~4~~

Men's 400m
Place	Athlete	Country	Time	Points
1st place, gold medalist(s)	Kirani James	Grenada	44.38	8
2nd place, silver medalist(s)	Quincy Hall	United States	44.38	7
3rd place, bronze medalist(s)	Rusheen McDonald	Jamaica	44.82	6
4	Vernon Norwood	United States	44.99	5
5	Gilles Biron	France	45.10	4
6	Attila Molnár	Hungary	45.19	3
7	Yuki Joseph Nakajima	Japan	45.19	2
8	Zandrion Barnes	Jamaica	45.29	1
9	Alex Haydock-Wilson	Great Britain	45.34	

Men's 800m
Place	Athlete	Country	Time	Points
1st place, gold medalist(s)	Emmanuel Wanyonyi	Kenya	1:43.20	8
2nd place, silver medalist(s)	Marco Arop	Canada	1:43.24	7
3rd place, bronze medalist(s)	Benjamin Robert	France	1:43.88	6
4	Wyclife Kinyamal	Kenya	1:44.04	5
5	Daniel Rowden	Great Britain	1:44.27	4
6	Yanis Meziane	France	1:44.28	3
7	Saúl Ordóñez	Spain	1:44.54	2
8	Gabriel Tual	France	1:44.65	1
9	Ben Pattison	Great Britain	1:44.87	
10	Andreas Kramer	Sweden	1:44.97	
11	Isaiah Harris	United States	1:45.10	
12	Simone Barontini	Italy	1:45.42	
	Erik Sowinski	United States	DNF	

Men's 110mH (±0.0 m/s)
Place	Athlete	Country	Time	Points
1st place, gold medalist(s)	Hansle Parchment	Jamaica	12.96	8
2nd place, silver medalist(s)	Daniel Roberts	United States	13.03	7
3rd place, bronze medalist(s)	Grant Holloway	United States	13.12	6
4	Wilhem Belocian	France	13.17	5
5	Rachid Muratake	Japan	13.19	4
6	Freddie Crittenden	United States	13.26	3
7	Cordell Tinch	United States	13.38	2
8	Rafael Pereira	Brazil	13.42	1
9	Joshua Zeller	Great Britain	13.45	
10	Xu Zhuoyi	China	13.56	

Men's 3000mSC
Place	Athlete	Country	Time	Points
1st place, gold medalist(s)	Soufiane El Bakkali	Morocco	8:10.31	8
2nd place, silver medalist(s)	Samuel Firewu	Ethiopia	8:11.29	7
3rd place, bronze medalist(s)	Amos Serem	Kenya	8:14.41	6
4	Abraham Kibiwot	Kenya	8:15.87	5
5	Avinash Sable	India	8:16.27	4
6	Daniel Arce	Spain	8:17.68	3
7	Ryuji Miura	Japan	8:18.32	2
8	Benjamin Kigen	Kenya	8:20.15	1
9	Mohamed Tindouft	Morocco	8:21.16	
10	Hailemariyam Amare	Ethiopia	8:22.68	
11	Mohammed Msaad	Morocco	8:22.77	
12	William Battershill	Great Britain	8:23.00	
13	Karl Bebendorf	Germany	8:24.08	
14	Vidar Johansson	Sweden	8:25.13	
15	Zak Seddon	Great Britain	8:26.48	
16	Isaac Updike	United States	8:27.37	
17	Andrew Bayer	United States	8:33.38	
18	Djilali Bedrani	France	8:39.70	
	El Mehdi Aboujanah	Spain	DNF	
	Abderrafia Bouassel	Morocco	DNF	

Men's Triple Jump
Place	Athlete	Country	Mark	Points
1st place, gold medalist(s)	Andy Díaz	Italy	17.43 m (−0.7 m/s)	8
2nd place, silver medalist(s)	Hugues Fabrice Zango	Burkina Faso	17.22 m (−0.6 m/s)	7
3rd place, bronze medalist(s)	Donald Scott	United States	16.65 m (−0.8 m/s)	6
4	Yasser Triki	Algeria	16.48 m (−0.8 m/s)	5
5	Praveen Chithravel	India	16.42 m (−0.9 m/s)	4
6	Abdulla Aboobacker	India	16.25 m (−0.8 m/s)	3
7	Chris Benard	United States	16.17 m (−1.0 m/s)	2
8	Wu Ruiting	China	16.09 m (−0.7 m/s)	1
9	Christian Taylor	United States	15.87 m (−0.9 m/s)	

Women's 400m
Place	Athlete	Country	Time	Points
1st place, gold medalist(s)	Marileidy Paulino	Dominican Republic	49.36	8
2nd place, silver medalist(s)	Candice McLeod	Jamaica	50.19	7
3rd place, bronze medalist(s)	Lynna Irby	United States	50.45	6
4	Sada Williams	Barbados	50.95	5
5	Victoria Ohuruogu	Great Britain	51.24	4
6	Talitha Diggs	United States	51.27	3
7	Martina Weil	Chile	51.30	2
8	Ama Pipi	Great Britain	51.51	1
9	Makenzie Dunmore	United States	53.85	

Women's 1500m
Place	Athlete	Country	Time	Points
1st place, gold medalist(s)	Freweyni Hailu	Ethiopia	3:56.56	8
2nd place, silver medalist(s)	Nelly Chepchirchir	Kenya	3:56.72	7
3rd place, bronze medalist(s)	Linden Hall	Australia	3:57.92	6
4	Melissa Courtney-Bryant	Great Britain	3:58.22	5
5	Worknesh Mesele	Ethiopia	4:00.84	4
6	Saron Berhe	Ethiopia	4:00.86	3
7	Sarah Healy	Ireland	4:01.48	2
8	Dani Jones	United States	4:01.66	1
9	Tigist Girma	Ethiopia	4:03.27	
10	Helen Schlachtenhaufen	United States	4:03.69	
11	Purity Chepkirui	Kenya	4:05.15	
12	Josette Andrews	United States	4:05.52	
13	Emily Mackay	United States	4:06.45	
14	Gaia Sabbatini	Italy	4:07.94	
15	Wang Chunyu	China	4:12.86	
	Claudia Bobocea	Romania	~~4:06.07~~	DSQ
	Kristie Schoffield	United States	DNF	
	Charlotte Mouchet	France	DNF	

Women's 3000m
Place	Athlete	Country	Time	Points
1st place, gold medalist(s)	Beatrice Chebet	Kenya	8:24.05	8
2nd place, silver medalist(s)	Laura Galván	Mexico	8:28.05	7
3rd place, bronze medalist(s)	Margaret Akidor	Kenya	8:29.88	6
4	Aynadis Mebratu	Ethiopia	8:30.99	5
5	Caroline Nyaga	Kenya	8:31.98	4
6	Mekedes Alemeshete	Ethiopia	8:36.71	3
7	Melknat Wudu	Ethiopia	8:36.81	2
8	Selah Jepleting Busienei	Kenya	8:36.91	1
9	Francine Niyomukunzi	Burundi	8:44.18	
10	Yenawa Nbret	Ethiopia	8:44.47	
11	Asayech Ayichew	Ethiopia	8:46.98	
12	Eloise Walker	Great Britain	8:48.15	
13	Abby Nichols	United States	8:52.75	
14	Tsiyon Abebe	Ethiopia	8:53.63	
15	Lemlem Nibret	Ethiopia	8:56.60	
	Tegab Berhe	Ethiopia	DNF	

Women's 400mH
Place	Athlete	Country	Time	Points
1st place, gold medalist(s)	Rushell Clayton	Jamaica	53.56	8
2nd place, silver medalist(s)	Andrenette Knight	Jamaica	53.87	7
3rd place, bronze medalist(s)	Janieve Russell	Jamaica	54.01	6
4	Ayomide Folorunso	Italy	54.08	5
5	Anna Ryzhykova	Ukraine	54.35	4
6	Anna Cockrell	United States	54.56	3
7	Viktoriya Tkachuk	Ukraine	55.25	2
8	Viivi Lehikoinen	Finland	55.44	1
9	Gianna Woodruff	Panama	55.45	

Women's High Jump
Place	Athlete	Country	Mark	Points
1st place, gold medalist(s)	Yaroslava Mahuchikh	Ukraine	2.02 m	8
2nd place, silver medalist(s)	Lia Apostolovski	Slovenia	1.92 m	7
3rd place, bronze medalist(s)	Eleanor Patterson	Australia	1.92 m	6
4	Elisabeth Pihela	Estonia	1.89 m	5
5	Yuliya Chumachenko	Ukraine	1.86 m	4
6	Nawal Meniker	France	1.86 m	3
7	Heta Tuuri	Finland	1.82 m	2
8	Erin Shaw	Australia	1.78 m	1

Women's Long Jump
Place	Athlete	Country	Mark	Points
1st place, gold medalist(s)	Ivana Španović	Serbia	6.88 m (−0.4 m/s)	8
2nd place, silver medalist(s)	Marthe Koala	Burkina Faso	6.79 m (−0.1 m/s)	7
3rd place, bronze medalist(s)	Ese Brume	Nigeria	6.71 m (−0.6 m/s)	6
4	Agate de Sousa	São Tomé and Príncipe	6.54 m (+0.1 m/s)	5
5	Brooke Buschkuehl	Australia	6.52 m (+0.1 m/s)	4
6	Maryse Luzolo	Germany	6.51 m (−0.4 m/s)	3
7	Milica Gardašević	Serbia	6.46 m (+0.3 m/s)	2
8	Quanesha Burks	United States	6.45 m (−0.4 m/s)	1
9	Xiong Shiqi	China	6.43 m (−0.2 m/s)	
10	Sumire Hata	Japan	6.20 m (−0.1 m/s)	

Women's Discus Throw
Place	Athlete	Country	Mark	Points
1st place, gold medalist(s)	Feng Bin	China	67.41 m	8
2nd place, silver medalist(s)	Sandra Perković	Croatia	67.32 m	7
3rd place, bronze medalist(s)	Laulauga Tausaga	United States	64.31 m	6
4	Izabela da Silva	Brazil	62.40 m	5
5	Liliana Cá	Portugal	62.21 m	4
6	Claudine Vita	Germany	61.76 m	3
7	Jiang Zhichao	China	60.79 m	2
8	Mélina Robert-Michon	France	60.08 m	1
9	Wang Fang	China	59.77 m	
	Daisy Osakue	Italy	NM	

=== National events ===
Men's 100m (+0.7 m/s)
Place	Athlete	Country	Time
1st place, gold medalist(s)	Shuang Wang	China	10.27
2nd place, silver medalist(s)	Deng Zhijian	China	10.33
3rd place, bronze medalist(s)	Chen Guanfeng	China	10.34
4	Yan Haibin	China	10.35
5	Chen Jiapeng	China	10.39
6	Haijian Zhang	China	10.41
	Sui Gaofei	China	DQ

Women's 100m (+0.7 m/s)
Place	Athlete	Country	Time
1st place, gold medalist(s)	Ge Manqi	China	11.33
2nd place, silver medalist(s)	Yuan Qiqi	China	11.34
3rd place, bronze medalist(s)	Liang Xiaojing	China	11.44
4	Li Yuting	China	11.55
5	Huang Guifen	China	11.57
6	Guoyi Liu	China	11.75
7	Lin Huang	China	11.91

Women's 100mH (+0.1 m/s)
Place	Athlete	Country	Time
1st place, gold medalist(s)	Lin Yuwei	China	13.00
2nd place, silver medalist(s)	Sining Xia	China	13.19
3rd place, bronze medalist(s)	Xianyan Luo	China	13.45
4	Nina Schultz	China	13.54
5	Yunzhe Jiangli	China	13.54
6	Yirong Gao	China	13.70
7	Yanqi Chen	China	13.74
8	Binbin Wu	China	13.92

=== U18 events ===
Men's 100m (+0.6 m/s)
Place	Athlete	Country	Time
1st place, gold medalist(s)	Erdun Pi	China	11.15
2nd place, silver medalist(s)	Dingjie Zhou	China	11.27
3rd place, bronze medalist(s)	Zicheng Zeng	China	11.29
4	Ruiquan Jiang	China	11.32
5	Zhixiang Ding	China	11.45

Women's 100m (+0.8 m/s)
Place	Athlete	Country	Time
1st place, gold medalist(s)	Leyao du	China	12.28
2nd place, silver medalist(s)	Le Chang	China	12.30
3rd place, bronze medalist(s)	Yuxuan Jiang	China	12.91
4	Mingxi Feng	China	12.99
5	Xinqing Yang	China	13.14
6	Shanshan Zhang	China	13.31
7	Jinglin Chen	China	13.40

== See also ==
- 2023 Diamond League
