= 2024 Xiamen Diamond League =

Athletics meeting in Xiamen, China

- Dates: 20 April 2024
- Host city: Xiamen, China
- Venue: Xiamen Egret Stadium
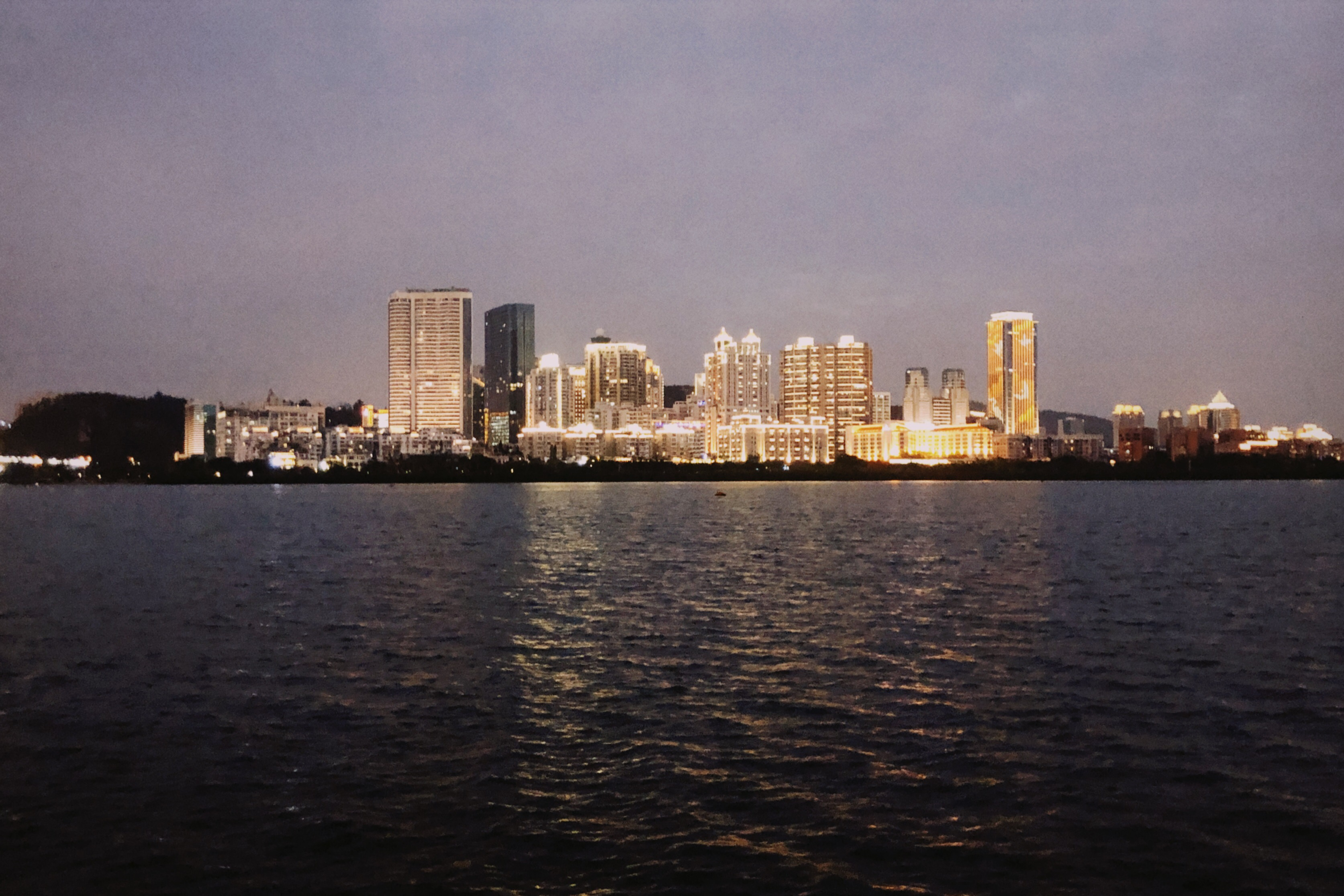
- Level: 2024 Diamond League

The 2024 Xiamen Diamond League was an outdoor track and field meeting in Xiamen, China. Held on 20 April at Xiamen Egret Stadium, it was the opening leg of the 2024 Diamond League – the highest level international track and field circuit.

== Highlights ==
At the meeting, Armand Duplantis set the pole vault world record by clearing 6.24 metres. His "actual" clearance height was measured to be 6.29 metres.

== Diamond events results ==
Athletes competing in the Diamond League disciplines earned extra compensation and points which went towards qualifying for the 2024 Diamond League finals. First place earned 8 points, with each step down in place earning one less point than the previous, until no points are awarded in 9th place or lower. In the case of a tie, each tying athlete earns the full amount of points for the place.

=== Men's ===
100 Metres
Place	Athlete	Nation	Time	Points	Notes
1st place, gold medalist(s)	Christian Coleman	United States	10.13	8	SB
2nd place, silver medalist(s)	Fred Kerley	United States	10.17	7	
3rd place, bronze medalist(s)	Ackeem Blake	Jamaica	10.20	6	SB
4	Rohan Watson	Jamaica	10.27	5	SB
5	Ryo Wada	Japan	10.31	4	
6	Ronnie Baker	United States	10.33	3	SB
7	Yoshihide Kiryū	Japan	10.38	2	SB
8	Brandon Carnes	United States	10.40	1	
9	Yohan Blake	Jamaica	10.43		SB
10	Deng Xinrui	China	10.55		
			Wind: (−0.6 m/s)		

800 Metres
Place	Athlete	Nation	Time	Points	Notes
1st place, gold medalist(s)	Marco Arop	Canada	1:43.61	8	WL
2nd place, silver medalist(s)	Wyclife Kinyamal	Kenya	1:43.66	7	SB
3rd place, bronze medalist(s)	Tshepiso Masalela	Botswana	1:43.88	6	PB
4	Ngeno Kipngetich	Kenya	1:44.76	5	
5	Andreas Kramer	Sweden	1:44.81	4	SB
6	Elias Ngeny	Kenya	1:45.37	3	
7	Clayton Murphy	United States	1:45.38	2	SB
8	Abdelati El Guesse	Morocco	1:45.65	1	
9	Liu Dezhu	China	1:45.66		NR, PB
10	Ethan Hussey	United Kingdom	1:46.20		SB
11	Peter Bol	Australia	1:47.02		
12	Mark English	Ireland	1:47.14		
—	Patryk Sieradzki	Poland	DNF		PM

5000 Metres
Place	Athlete	Nation	Time	Points	Notes
1st place, gold medalist(s)	Lamecha Girma	Ethiopia	12:58.96	8	NR, PB
2nd place, silver medalist(s)	Nicholas Kimeli	Kenya	12:59.78	7	SB
3rd place, bronze medalist(s)	Birhanu Balew	Brunei	13:00.47	6	SB
4	Samwel Chebolei Masai	Kenya	13:00.69	5	PB
5	Addisu Yihune	Ethiopia	13:01.44	4	SB
6	Cornelius Kemboi	Kenya	13:02.49	3	SB
7	Ronald Kwemoi	Kenya	13:02.56	2	PB
8	Kuma Girma	Ethiopia	13:04.45	1	SB
9	Benson Kiplangat	Kenya	13:04.66		SB
10	Stewart McSweyn	Australia	13:05.18		SB
11	Muktar Edris	Ethiopia	13:10.40		SB
12	Brian Fay	Ireland	13:14.97		SB
13	Mohamed Abdilaahi	Germany	13:18.45		
14	Jack Rayner	Australia	13:18.74		
15	Sam Parsons	Germany	13:20.32		
16	Nibret Melak	Ethiopia	13:23.06		SB
17	Dan Kibet	Uganda	13:24.64		SB
18	Matthew Ramsden	Australia	13:26.60		
—	Mounir Akbache	France	DNF		PM
—	Callum Davies	Australia	DNF		PM

110 Metres hurdles
Place	Athlete	Nation	Time	Points	Notes
1st place, gold medalist(s)	Daniel Roberts	United States	13.11	8	WL
2nd place, silver medalist(s)	Cordell Tinch	United States	13.16	7	SB
3rd place, bronze medalist(s)	Shunsuke Izumiya	Japan	13.17	6	SB
4	Freddie Crittenden	United States	13.30	5	SB
5	Eric Edwards Jr.	United States	13.31	4	SB
6	Hansle Parchment	Jamaica	13.33	3	SB
7	Liu Junxi	China	13.48	2	SB
8	Orlando Bennett	Jamaica	13.58	1	SB
9	Jamal Britt	United States	13.88		
			Wind: (−0.3 m/s)		

High jump
Place	Athlete	Nation	Mark	Points	Notes
1st place, gold medalist(s)	Shelby McEwen	United States	2.27 m	8	MR
2nd place, silver medalist(s)	Mutaz Barsham	Qatar	2.27 m	7	=MR, PB
3rd place, bronze medalist(s)	Hamish Kerr	New Zealand	2.24 m	6	
4	Joel Baden	Australia	2.24 m	5	
4	Tomohiro Shinno	Japan	2.24 m	5	
4	Wang Zhen	China	2.24 m	5	SB
7	Christoff Bryan	Jamaica	2.20 m	2	
8	Luis Castro	Puerto Rico	2.15 m	1	
9	Vernon Turner	United States	2.15 m		
—	Thomas Carmoy	Belgium	NM		

Pole vault
Place	Athlete	Nation	Mark	Points	Notes
1st place, gold medalist(s)	Armand Duplantis	Sweden	6.24 m	8	SB
2nd place, silver medalist(s)	Sam Kendricks	United States	5.82 m	7	
3rd place, bronze medalist(s)	Huang Bokai	China	5.72 m	6	SB
4	Austin Miller	United States	5.62 m	5	
4	Zhong Tao	China	5.62 m	5	
6	Ben Broeders	Belgium	5.42 m	3	
6	Chris Nilsen	United States	5.42 m	3	
6	Jacob Wooten	United States	5.42 m	3	
—	Bo Kanda Lita Baehre	Germany	NM		
—	Yao Jie	China	NM		

Triple jump
Place	Athlete	Nation	Mark	Points	Notes
1st place, gold medalist(s)	Pedro Pichardo	Portugal	17.51 m (+0.6 m/s)	8	MR
2nd place, silver medalist(s)	Hugues Fabrice Zango	Burkina Faso	17.12 m (+0.3 m/s)	7	
3rd place, bronze medalist(s)	Su Wen	China	16.82 m (+0.1 m/s)	6	
4	Fang Yaoqing	China	16.73 m (± 0.0 m/s)	5	
5	Zhu Yaming	China	16.55 m (+0.1 m/s)	4	
6	Jean-Marc Pontvianne	France	16.46 m (−0.3 m/s)	3	
7	Tiago Pereira	Portugal	16.41 m (−0.2 m/s)	2	
8	Abdulla Aboobacker	India	16.33 m (−0.7 m/s)	1	
9	Donald Scott	United States	16.02 m (−0.5 m/s)		
10	Max Heß	Germany	16.02 m (−0.6 m/s)		

=== Women's ===
200 Metres
Place	Athlete	Nation	Time	Points	Notes
1st place, gold medalist(s)	Torrie Lewis	Australia	22.96	8	MR
2nd place, silver medalist(s)	Sha'Carri Richardson	United States	22.99	7	SB
3rd place, bronze medalist(s)	Tamara Clark	United States	23.01	6	
4	Anavia Battle	United States	23.02	5	SB
5	Twanisha Terry	United States	23.25	4	SB
6	Mujinga Kambundji	Switzerland	23.39	3	
7	Jessica-Bianca Wessolly	Germany	23.65	2	SB
8	Caisja Chandler	United States	23.72	1	SB
9	Anthonique Strachan	Bahamas	24.21		
			Wind: (−0.4 m/s)		

400 Metres
Place	Athlete	Nation	Time	Points	Notes
1st place, gold medalist(s)	Marileidy Paulino	Dominican Republic	50.08	8	SB
2nd place, silver medalist(s)	Natalia Kaczmarek	Poland	50.29	7	SB
3rd place, bronze medalist(s)	Britton Wilson	United States	51.26	6	
4	Sada Williams	Barbados	51.97	5	
5	Ellie Beer	Australia	52.36	4	
6	Kaylin Whitney	United States	52.47	3	
7	Aliyah Abrams	Guyana	52.69	2	
8	Evelis Aguilar	Colombia	52.97	1	SB
9	Floria Gueï	France	53.65		SB

1500 Metres
Place	Athlete	Nation	Time	Points	Notes
1st place, gold medalist(s)	Gudaf Tsegay	Ethiopia	3:50.30	8	MR, WL, PB
2nd place, silver medalist(s)	Birke Haylom	Ethiopia	3:53.22	7	PB
3rd place, bronze medalist(s)	Worknesh Mesele	Ethiopia	3:57.61	6	SB
4	Diribe Welteji	Ethiopia	3:57.62	5	
5	Freweyni Hailu	Ethiopia	3:58.18	4	
6	Georgia Griffith	Australia	3:59.04	3	PB
7	Habitam Alemu	Ethiopia	3:59.06	2	PB
8	Saron Berhe	Ethiopia	3:59.21	1	PB
9	Sarah Billings	Australia	3:59.59		PB
10	Linden Hall	Australia	4:00.71		SB
11	Addison Wiley	United States	4:03.45		SB
12	Axumawit Embaye	Ethiopia	4:04.94		SB
13	Winnie Nanyondo	Uganda	4:06.09		SB
14	Gaia Sabbatini	Italy	4:08.90		SB
—	Nigist Getachew	Ethiopia	DNF		PM
—	Aneta Lemiesz	Poland	DNF		PM

100 Metres hurdles
Place	Athlete	Nation	Time	Points	Notes
1st place, gold medalist(s)	Jasmine Camacho-Quinn	Puerto Rico	12.45	8	MR, SB
2nd place, silver medalist(s)	Devynne Charlton	Bahamas	12.49	7	SB
3rd place, bronze medalist(s)	Cyréna Samba-Mayela	France	12.55	6	NR, PB
4	Danielle Williams	Jamaica	12.56	5	SB
5	Tobi Amusan	Nigeria	12.58	4	SB
6	Masai Russell	United States	12.67	3	SB
7	Ditaji Kambundji	Switzerland	12.70	2	SB
8	Megan Tapper	Jamaica	12.88	1	SB
9	Alaysha Johnson	United States	13.01		
10	Wu Yanni	China	13.04		SB
			Wind: (−0.2 m/s)		

3000 Metres steeplechase
Place	Athlete	Nation	Time	Points	Notes
1st place, gold medalist(s)	Beatrice Chepkoech	Kenya	8:55.40	8	MR, WL
2nd place, silver medalist(s)	Faith Cherotich	Kenya	9:05.49	7	SB
3rd place, bronze medalist(s)	Peruth Chemutai	Uganda	9:12.99	6	SB
4	Jackline Chepkoech	Kenya	9:19.64	5	SB
5	Lomi Muleta	Ethiopia	9:21.76	4	SB
6	Frehiwot Gesese	Ethiopia	9:25.53	3	PB
7	Olivia Gürth	Germany	9:29.78	2	SB
8	Regan Yee	Canada	9:31.47	1	SB
9	Cara Feain-Ryan	Australia	9:32.08		SB
10	Aude Clavier	France	9:32.75		PB
11	Madie Boreman	United States	9:34.79		SB
12	Adva Cohen	Israel	9:35.57		SB
13	Xu Shuangshuang	China	9:38.62		SB
14	Juliane Hvid	Denmark	10:02.95		SB
—	Fancy Cherono	Kenya	DNF		PM

Shot put
Place	Athlete	Nation	Mark	Points	Notes
1st place, gold medalist(s)	Gong Lijiao	China	19.72 m	8	MR, SB
2nd place, silver medalist(s)	Maddi Wesche	New Zealand	19.63 m	7	PB
3rd place, bronze medalist(s)	Chase Jackson	United States	19.62 m	6	
4	Sarah Mitton	Canada	19.35 m	5	
5	Yemisi Ogunleye	Germany	19.24 m	4	
6	Song Jiayuan	China	19.09 m	3	
7	Maggie Ewen	United States	18.87 m	2	
8	Danniel Thomas-Dodd	Jamaica	18.76 m	1	
9	Jessica Schilder	Netherlands	18.60 m		
10	Adelaide Aquilla	United States	17.62 m		

Discus throw
Place	Athlete	Nation	Mark	Points	Notes
1st place, gold medalist(s)	Valarie Allman	United States	69.80 m	8	MR, SB
2nd place, silver medalist(s)	Yaime Pérez	Cuba	68.83 m	7	
3rd place, bronze medalist(s)	Feng Bin	China	67.07 m	6	SB
4	Sandra Perković Elkasević	Croatia	65.60 m	5	SB
5	Kristin Pudenz	Germany	64.63 m	4	SB
6	Shanice Craft	Germany	63.52 m	3	
7	Liliana Cá	Portugal	63.27 m	2	
8	Claudine Vita	Germany	62.74 m	1	SB
9	Jorinde van Klinken	Netherlands	62.33 m		
10	Laulauga Tausaga	United States	60.61 m		

== Promotional events results ==
=== Women's ===
Javelin throw
Place	Athlete	Nation	Mark	Notes
1st place, gold medalist(s)	Qianqian Dai	China	61.25 m	MR
2nd place, silver medalist(s)	Līna Mūze	Latvia	58.91 m	SB
3rd place, bronze medalist(s)	Flor Ruiz	Colombia	58.50 m	SB
4	Qiaohui Gai	China	57.99 m	
5	Lü Huihui	China	57.74 m	
6	Kathryn Mitchell	Australia	55.57 m	
7	Tori Peeters	New Zealand	55.20 m	
8	Yu Yuzhen	China	51.53 m	

== National events ==
=== Men's ===
100 Metres
Place	Athlete	Nation	Time	Notes
1st place, gold medalist(s)	Jing Lyu	China	10.87	
2nd place, silver medalist(s)	Yuxuan Liu	China	10.94	
3rd place, bronze medalist(s)	Jianxin Zeng	China	10.96	
4	Shuo Yuan	China	11.02	
5	Zekang Li	China	11.03	
6	Aizihaer Aihetamu	China	11.05	
7	Xiaoyan Wang	China	11.79	
—	Peng Jiang	China	DQ	
			Wind: (+ 0.5 m/s)	

5000 Metres
Place	Athlete	Nation	Time	Notes
1st place, gold medalist(s)	Xiaokan Wang	China	15:53.93	
2nd place, silver medalist(s)	Zhiming Chen	China	15:56.54	
3rd place, bronze medalist(s)	Wenzhui Zhang	China	15:57.27	
4	Guangyin Luo	China	16:28.23	
5	Xieguo Zhong	China	16:32.68	
6	Shinchang Huang	China	16:53.80	
7	Jian Sun	China	16:56.95	
8	Zheng Fang	China	17:09.30	
9	Chenjun Luo	China	17:11.76	
10	Bolong Chen	Hong Kong	17:17.07	
11	Xushui Ye	China	17:28.78	
12	Pan Mo	China	18:15.36	
13	Yutiancheng Wu	China	18:18.27	
14	Zisheng Meng	China	18:47.82	
15	Ziheng Li	China	19:18.51	

=== Women's ===
100 Metres
Place	Athlete	Nation	Time	Notes
1st place, gold medalist(s)	Lui Lai Yiu	Hong Kong	12.50	
2nd place, silver medalist(s)	Ziyan He	China	12.74	
3rd place, bronze medalist(s)	Yongyi Tang	China	12.77	
4	Xinye Yang	China	12.88	
5	Mengmeng Zhou	China	12.89	
6	Mingyi Yu	China	12.93	
7	Qi Zhang	China	12.99	
			Wind: (−0.3 m/s)	

5000 Metres
Place	Athlete	Nation	Time	Notes
1st place, gold medalist(s)	Xuemei Huang	China	16:52.23	
2nd place, silver medalist(s)	Langqing Wang	China	18:59.01	
3rd place, bronze medalist(s)	Yixin Wei	China	20:23.02	
4	Mei Lin	China	21:22.47	
5	Wei Pan	China	21:22.71	
6	Anqi Chen	China	21:34.10	
7	Guowei Shi	China	22:19.40	

== See also ==
- 2024 Diamond League
