= Ryo Wada (sprinter) =

Japanese sprinter (born 2000)

Ryoichi Akamatsu
Personal information
- Native name: Japanese: 和田 遼
- Nationality: Japan
- Born: 18 May 2000 (26 years, 44 days old) Kyoto, Japan
- Education: Rakunan High School; Toyo University

Sport
- Sport: Athletics
- Event(s): 100 metres Triple jump
- Club: Miki House sports club

Achievements and titles
- National finals: 2019 Japanese U20s; • 100m, 4th
- Personal best(s): 100m: 10.10 (+2.0) (2022) TJ: 15.09 m (+1.4) (2020)
- Updated on 20 April 2024

Ryo Wada (Japanese: 和田 遼; born 18 May 2000) is a Japanese sprinter specializing in the 100 metres. He ran 10.10 seconds for 100 m at the 2022 Kyoto Championships, making him the 15th fastest Japanese sprinter in history and the 6th fastest student.

== Career ==
Wada had participated in athletics since high school, setting a Japanese high school record for the 4 × 100 m relay. He finished 4th at the 2019 Japanese U20 championships in the 100 m. In 2021, he improved from 10.52 to 10.28 seconds in the 100 m.

In 2020, Wada ran 10.10 seconds for 100 m at the Kyoto Championships, making him the 15th faster Japanese performer in history and the 6th fastest among students. He withdrew from the 2023 Japan Championships in Athletics due to a hamstring fasciitis injury on his right leg.

At the 2024 Xiamen Diamond League, Wada placed 5th in the 100 m and was the top Asian finisher.

== Personal life ==
Wada was born in Kyoto, Japan. In 2019, he graduated from Rakunan High School in southern Kyoto. He graduated from Toyo University in 2023, after which he became sponsored by Miki House sports club.

== Statistics ==
=== Personal best progression ===
100m progression
#	Mark	Pl.	Competition	Venue	Date	Ref.
1	10.57 (−1.1 m/s)	(silver) (Heat 2)		Fujiyoshida, Japan	5 Sep 2020	
2	10.55 (−0.1 m/s)	(silver) (Round C)		Fujiyoshida, Japan	5 Sep 2020	
3	10.53 (+1.2 m/s)	(gold) (Heat 1)		Kumagaya, Japan	30 Mar 2021	
4	10.51 (+0.8 m/s)	1st place, gold medalist(s)		Ageo, Japan	10 Apr 2021	
5	10.42 (+1.5 m/s)	(silver) (Heat 3)	Kanto University Championships	Sagamihara, Japan	19 May 2021	
6	10.28 (+1.6 m/s)	(gold) (Semifinal 1)	Kyoto Championships	Kyoto, Japan	16 Jul 2021	
7	10.10 (+2.0 m/s)	(gold) (Semifinal 3)	Kyoto Championships	Kyoto, Japan	15 Jul 2022	
