= Xiamen Diamond League =

Track and field event in Xiamen, China

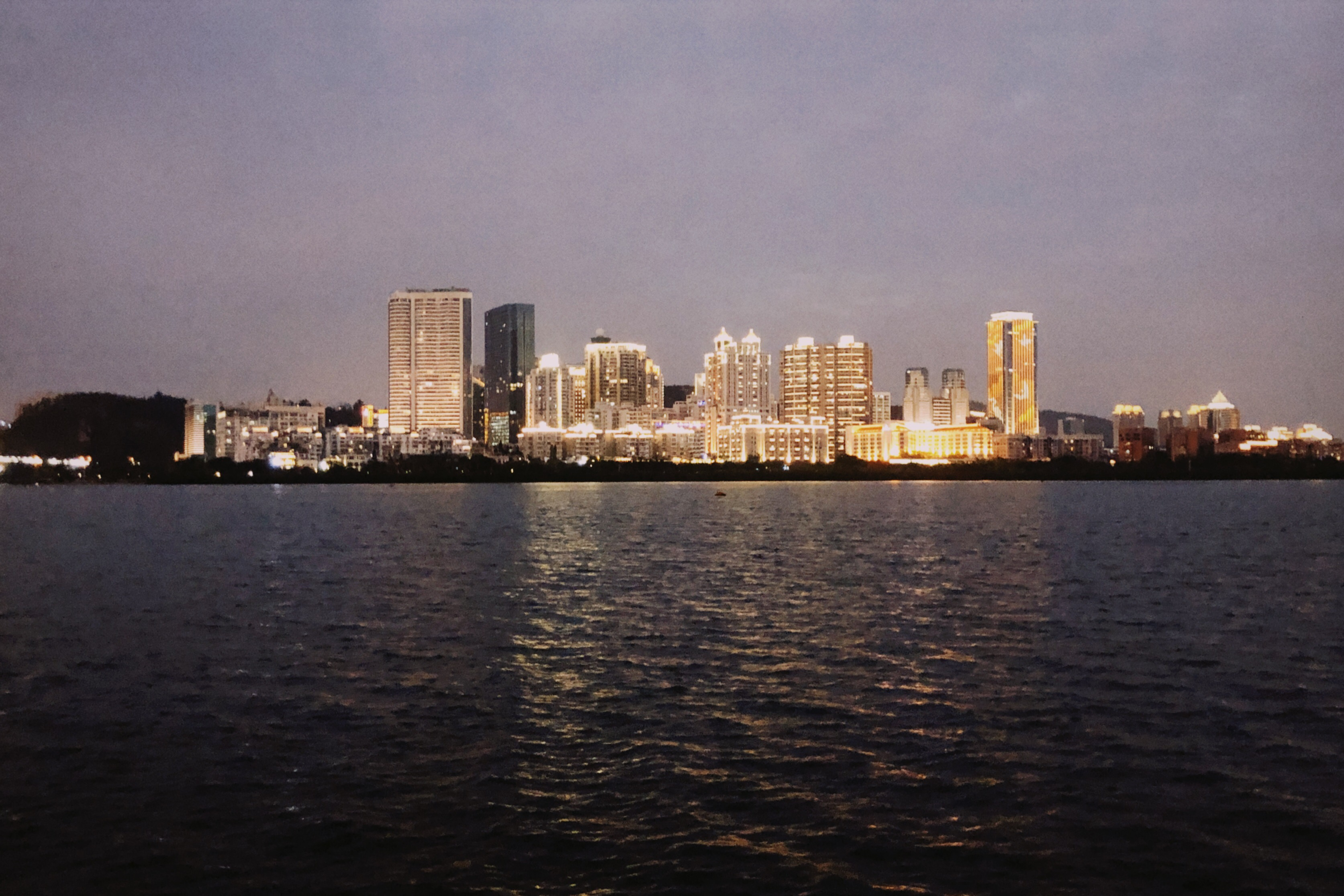
- The city of Xiamen
- Date: April, September
- Location: Xiamen, China
- Event type: Track and field
- World Athletics Cat.: GW
- Established: 2 September 2023; 3 years ago
- Organizer: Rune Stenersen
- Website: Xiamen Diamond League
- 2026 Xiamen Diamond League

The Xiamen Diamond League is a track and field meeting held at Xiamen Egret Stadium in Xiamen, China.

The meeting is part of the Diamond League series, having replaced Shenzhen as China's host city and will continue to host one of two Chinese Wanda Diamond League meetings until 2032. The new location was announced on 2 August 2023.

It is the only Diamond League meeting to take place on a 10-lane track for straight sprints, as part of the US$1.2 billion Egret Stadium.

== Editions ==
Xiamen Diamond League editions
Ed.	Meeting	Series	Date	Ref.
1st	2023 Xiamen Diamond League	2023 Diamond League	2 Sep 2023	
2nd	2024 Xiamen Diamond League	2024 Diamond League	20 Apr 2024	
3rd	2025 Xiamen Diamond League	2025 Diamond League	26 Apr 2025	
4th	2026 Xiamen Diamond League	2026 Diamond League	23 May 2026	
5th	2027 Xiamen Diamond League	2027 Diamond League	15 May 2027	

== Meeting records ==
=== Men ===
Men's meeting records of the Xiamen Diamond League
Event	Record	Athlete	Nationality	Date	Meet	Ref.
100 m	9.83 (+0.4 m/s)	Christian Coleman	United States	2 September 2023	2023	
400 m	43.92	Collen Kebinatshipi	Botswana	23 May 2026	2026	
800 m	1:43.20	Emmanuel Wanyonyi	Kenya	2 September 2023	2023	
3000 m	8:47.31	Xie Mingjie	China	26 April 2025	2025	
5000 m	12:57.32	Addisu Yihune	Ethiopia	23 May 2026	2026	
110 m hurdles	12.96 (±0.0 m/s)	Hansle Parchment	Jamaica	2 September 2023	2023	
300 m hurdles	33.05 WBP, DLR	Karsten Warholm	Norway	26 April 2025	2025	
400 m hurdles	46.72	Alison dos Santos	Brazil	23 May 2026	2026	
3000 m steeplechase	8:05.61	Samuel Firewu	Ethiopia	26 April 2025	2025	
High jump	2.27 m	Shelby McEwen	United States	20 April 2024	2024	
High jump	2.27 m	Mutaz Essa Barshim	Qatar	20 April 2024	2024	
Pole vault	6.24 m	Armand Duplantis	Sweden	20 April 2024	2024	
Long jump	8.46 m (±0.0 m/s)	Miltiadis Tentoglou	Greece	23 May 2026	2026	
Triple jump	17.51 m (+0.6 m/s)	Pedro Pichardo	Portugal	20 April 2024	2024	
Shot put	22.34 m	Rajindra Campbell	Jamaica	23 May 2026	2026	
4 × 100 m relay	40.81	Xiamen Sports Group Huiyi Club	China	23 May 2026	2026	

=== Women ===
Women's meeting records of the Xiamen Diamond League
Event	Record	Athlete	Nationality	Date	Meet	Ref.
100 m	11.33 (+0.7 m/s)	Ge Manqi	China	2 September 2023	2023	
200 m	21.87 (+0.2 m/s)	Shericka Jackson	Jamaica	23 May 2026	2026	
400 m	49.36	Marileidy Paulino	Dominican Republic	2 September 2023	2023	
1000 m	2:29.21	Faith Kipyegon	Kenya	26 April 2025	2025	
1500 m	3:50.30	Gudaf Tsegay	Ethiopia	20 April 2024	2024	
3000 m	8:24.05	Beatrice Chebet	Kenya	2 September 2023	2023	
5000 m	14:27.12	Beatrice Chebet	Kenya	26 April 2025	2025	
100 m hurdles	12.14 (+0.5 m/s)	Masai Russell	United States	23 May 2026	2026	
400 m hurdles	53.56	Rushell Clayton	Jamaica	2 September 2023	2023	
3000 m steeplechase	8:51.06	Peruth Chemutai	Uganda	23 May 2026	2026	
High jump	2.02 m	Yaroslava Mahuchikh	Ukraine	2 September 2023	2023	
Long jump	6.88 m (−0.4 m/s)	Ivana Vuleta	Serbia	2 September 2023	2023	
Shot put	20.47 m	Jessica Schilder	Netherlands	26 April 2025	2025	
Discus throw	69.80 m	Valarie Allman	United States	20 April 2024	2024	
Javelin throw	71.74 m WU20R, DLR	Yan Ziyi	China	23 May 2026	2026	
4 × 100 m relay	46.38	Fu Jian	China	23 May 2026	2026	

== See also ==
- Sport in China
- Diamond League Shanghai
