= CJ Allen (hurdler) =

American athlete (born 1995)

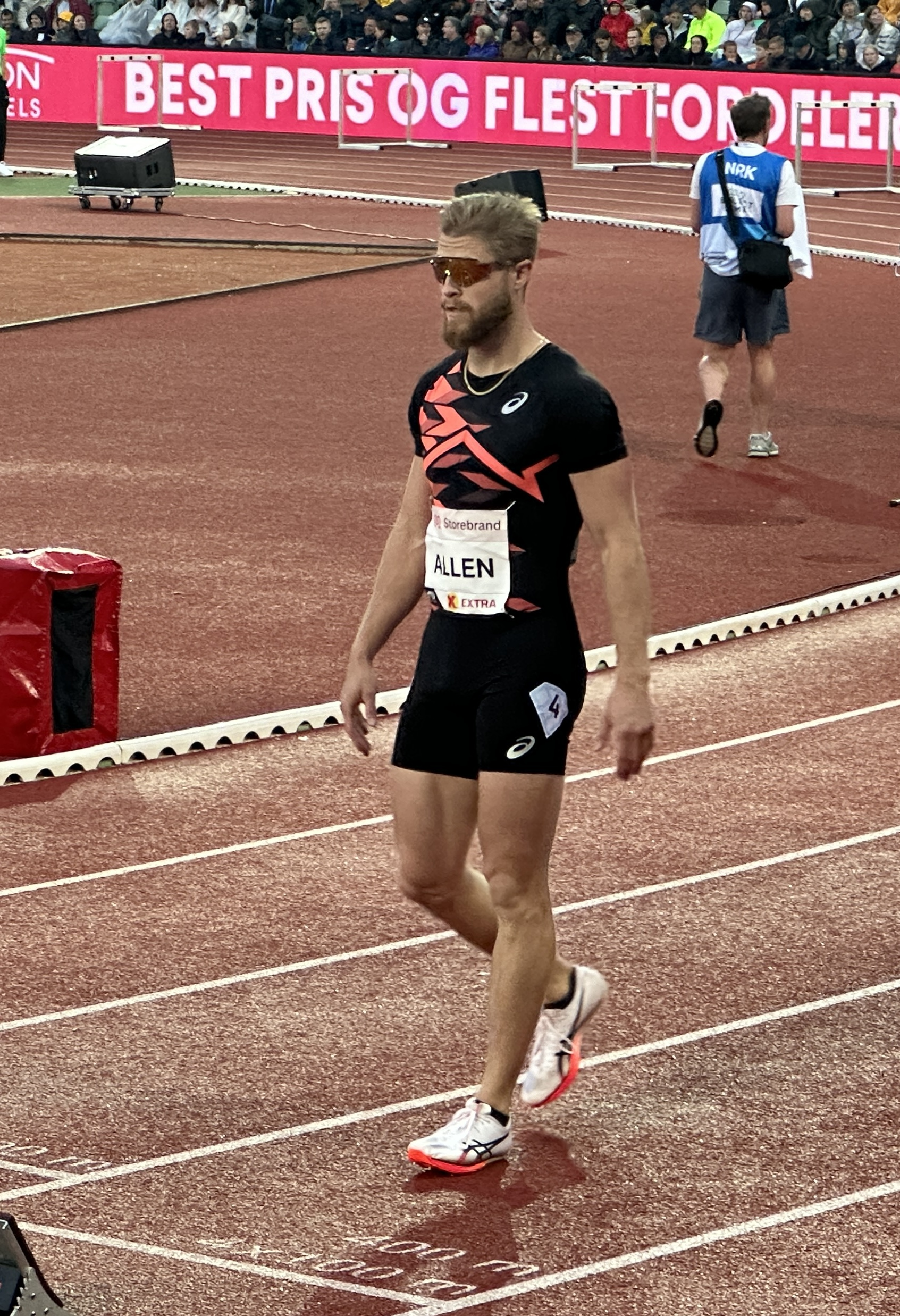
- CJ Allen at the 2024 Bislett Games.

Personal information
- Nationality: American
- Born: February 14, 1995 (age 31)

Sport
- Sport: Athletics
- Event: 400m hurdles

Achievements and titles
- Personal bests: Outdoor; 400m hurdles: 47.58 (Oslo, 2023); Indoor; 400m hurdles: 48.88 (Iowa, 2023)
Medal record
Men's athletics
Representing United States
NACAC Championships
Gold medal – first place	2025 Freeport	400 m hurdles

Craig James Allen (born February 14, 1995) is an American track and field athlete who competes in the 400 meters hurdles. He is the US men's national record holder over 400m hurdles indoors.

== Early life ==
From Belfair, Washington, Allen attended North Mason High School.

== Career ==
In 2017, Allen ran 49.44 seconds in the event for Washington State University in the NCAA 400-meter hurdle heats but finished ninth and missed the final of the NCAA by one spot. In 2022, he ran personal-best time of 48.17s at the 2022 USA Outdoor Track and Field Championships, but finished fourth in the USA final, and missed earning a place on the United States' World Athletics Championships team in Eugene by one spot.

=== 2023; World Championships debut ===
In January 2023, Allen broke the American national record for the 400m hurdles indoors. He ran 48.88 seconds at the American Track League Pro Puma Classic meet held at the University of Iowa. He beat the 49.78 seconds set by Reuben McCoy in 2011, and was a one-hundredth of a second (.01) from the world record of 48.78, set in 2012 by Felix Sanchez of the Dominican Republic.

Allen won the 400m hurdles in 47.92 seconds at the Meeting de Paris at Stade Charlety, Friday, June 9, 2023, in Paris. Allen set a new personal best time for the 400m hurdles competing at the Oslo Diamond League meeting in 2023.

Competing at the 2023 USA Outdoor Track and Field Championships, in Eugene, Oregon, he finished second in the 400m hurdles finals behind Rai Benjamin, qualifying for the 2023 World Athletics Championships in Budapest in August 2023. In Budapest, he reached the semi finals.

=== 2024; Olympic Games debut ===
In May 2024, he finished runner-up in the 400 metres hurdles at the 2024 Doha Diamond League. He followed that up with a third place at the 2024 Prefontaine Classic, and third place at the 2024 BAUHAUS-galan Diamond League event in Stockholm.

In June 2024, he finished second in the 400 metres hurdles at the US Olympic trials. He competed at the 2024 Summer Olympics in Paris in August 2024, in the 400 metres hurdles, reaching the semi-finals.

=== 2025-present: NACAC champion ===
He ran a personal best 34.96 seconds for the 300 metres hurdles at the 2025 Xiamen Diamond League event in China, in April 2025. He finished sixth in the 400 metres hurdles at the 2025 Shanghai Diamond League event in China on 3 May 2025. He finished fifth on 16 in May at the 2025 Doha Diamond League. In May 2025, month, he was named as a challenger in the long hurdles category at the 2025 Grand Slam Track event in Philadelphia. He was sixth at the 2025 Prefontaine Classic on 5 July.

He reached the final of the 400 metres hurdles at the 2025 USA Outdoor Track and Field Championships in Eugene, placing fourth overall. He won the gold medal in the 400 metres hurdles at the 2025 NACAC Championships in Freeport, The Bahamas. He placed fourth in a season's best 48.00 seconds in the 400 metres hurdles at the Diamond League Final in Zurich on 28 August.

In May, he ran a personal best in the 300 metres hurdles with 34.53 seconds at the 2026 Shanghai Diamond League.

== Statistics ==
Grand Slam Track results
Slam	Race group	Event	Pl.	Time	Prize money
2025 Kingston Slam	Long hurdles	400 m hurdles	5th	48.71	US$15,000
2025 Kingston Slam	Long hurdles	400 m	7th	46.95	US$15,000
2025 Philadelphia Slam	Long hurdles	400 m hurdles	5th	49.61	US$15,000
2025 Philadelphia Slam	Long hurdles	400 m	8th	48.34	US$15,000
