= Miki House =

The Miki House Group a.k.a. Miki Shoko Co., Ltd. (三起商行株式会社, Miki Shōkō Kabushiki Kaisha) is a Japanese corporation. Established in April 1971, with Koichi Kimura as the founder, and formally incorporated in September 1978, it has its headquarters in Osaka and a regional office in Tokyo.

Miki House (ミキハウス, Mikihausu) is a Japanese children's clothing and product company. Kunio Nishimura of Look Japan stated in 2001 that in Japan the company's name was "synonymous" with "top-drawer" merchandise.

As of 1999 it has a magazine, Love, which it publishes once per month. Circa that year it began promoting "grandchildren's day", a holiday created by retail companies in an effort to drive more sales.
