= Aynadis Mebratu =

Ethiopian runner (born 2004)

Personal information
- Native name: አይናዲስ መብሪት
- Full name: Aynadis Mebratu Tadesse
- Nationality: Ethiopia
- Born: 25 November 2004 (age 21)

Sport
- Sport: Athletics
- Event(s): 1500 metres Mile run
- Club: Ethio Electric
- Coached by: Teodros Hailu

Achievements and titles
- National finals: 2019 Ethiopian Champs; • 5000m, 8th
- Personal bests: 3000m: 8:30.99 NJR (2023) 5000m: 14:22.76 (2024)
Medal record
Women's athletics
Representing Ethiopia
African U20 Championships
Bronze medal – third place	2023 Ndola	3000 m
Silver medal – second place	2023 Ndola	5000 m
- Updated on 20 February 2024

Aynadis Mebratu Tadesse (Amharic: አይናዲስ መብሪት; born 25 November 2004), also spelled Aynadis Mebrit, is an Ethiopian middle- and long-distance runner. She is the #11 all-time performer over 5000 metres indoors, and the African under-20 record-holder in the 3000 metres.

== Career ==
Aynadis made her national debut at age 15, finishing 8th at the 2019 Ethiopian Athletics Championships in the 5000 metres. She would not return until 2022, finishing four half marathons across Europe. Highlights included achieving a best time of 1:07:45 at the Adizero Road to Records race in Herzogenaurach, and finishing runner-up at the Porto Half Marathon.

After finishing 4th at the Prague Half Marathon, Aynadis opened up her 2023 season on the track by winning two medals at the African U20 Championships. In the 3000 m, she won the bronze medal, and in the 5000 m four days later she improved to the silver medal. She followed by competing in the Meeting International De La Province De Liège 5000 m, setting a "hellish pace" to win over Girmawit Gebrzihair in 14:45.70. In her first Diamond League race at the 2023 Xiamen Diamond League, Aynadis ran 8:30.99 for 3000 m to place 4th, breaking the Ethiopian U20 record and African U20 record previously held by Meskerem Mamo. She finished her season by finishing runner-up at the Lisbon Half Marathon.

Aynadis ran her first indoor track and field race in 2024 at the Boston University Terrier Classic 5000 m. After being paced by Alicia Monson through 3000 m in 8:54.5, Aynadis finished 3rd in a new personal best of 14:44.94. The mark was the number 15 all-time performance in the short track 5000 metres, making her the #11 all-time performer.

== Personal life ==
Originally a part of the Ethio Electric athletics club, Aynadis was sponsored by Adidas at the Terrier Classic in 2024. She trains in Addis Ababa with a group coached by Teodros Hailu, the husband of Meseret Defar.

== Statistics ==
=== Circuit performances ===
Grand Slam Track results
Slam	Race group	Event	Pl.	Time	Prize money
2025 Miami Slam	Long distance	5000 m	5th	15:01.62	US$15,000
2025 Miami Slam	Long distance	3000 m	5th	8:35.61	US$15,000

=== Personal best progression ===
5000m progression
#	Mark	Pl.	Competition	Venue	Date	Ref.
1	16:11.2 h A	8th	Ethiopian Athletics Championships	Addis Ababa, Ethiopia	11 May 2019	
2	14:45.70	1st place, gold medalist(s)	Meeting International De La Province De Liège	Liège, Belgium	11 Jul 2023	
3	14:44.94 sh	3rd place, bronze medalist(s)	Boston University John Thomas Terrier Classic	Boston, MA	26 Jan 2024	
