= Xiamen Egret Stadium =

Sports venue in Xiamen, China

- Interactive map of Xiamen Egret Stadium
- Location: Binhai E Ave, Xindian Subdistrict, Xiang'an District, Xiamen, Fujian, China
- Coordinates: 24°34′00″N 118°11′42″E
- Capacity: 53,443 (athletics); 60,592 (football)
- Public transit: 3 at Sports & Convention Center

Construction
- Opened: 2023

The Xiamen Egret Stadium, also known as the Xiamen Bailu Stadium (simplified Chinese: 厦门白鹭体育场; traditional Chinese: 廈門白鷺體育場; pinyin: Xiàmén Báilù Tǐyùchǎng), is a multi-use stadium in Xiang'an district, Xiamen, China. It is currently used mostly for football matches and athletics events. It hosts the Xiamen Diamond League. The stadium has a capacity of 53,443 people for athletics and football. The capacity can sometimes be higher with temporary seats, resulting in a maximum capacity of 60,592 in football configuration with movable stands deployed.

The stadium was initially built as part of the bid to host the 2023 AFC Asian Cup. It was inaugurated on 2 September 2023. Its audio equipment came from EAW.

== Architecture ==
The Xiamen Egret Stadium has a construction area of 180,600 m^{2} (1,944,000 ft^{2}) and is 86.25 m (283.0 ft) high. Its design was inspired by the image of a white egret spreading its wings and the shape of traditional southern Fujian dwellings. To block the afternoon sun and promote ventilation, the roof on the west side of the stadium is 8 m (26 ft) higher than the east side; in the north and south directions, the stadium is equipped with glass curtain walls so that spectators can see the sea view.

The stadium has three tiers of stands, with the ground tier consisting of movable modules. During athletics events, the modules are moved outside the stadium to make way for the running track. During football matches, the modules are moved inside the stadium to provide over 7,000 additional seats. Xiamen Bailu Stadium is the third stadium in the world, after the Stade de France and the Singapore National Stadium, and the first stadium in mainland China, that can switch between these two modes.

== Concerts ==
- May 10-12, 2024 - Joker Xue, Extraterrestrial World Tour
- August 17-18, 2024 - Jolin Tsai, Ugly Beauty World Tour
- October 19-20, 2024 - JJ Lin, JJ20 World Tour
- December 20-22, 2024 - G.E.M., I Am Gloria World Tour
- May 24, 2025 - A-Mei, ASMR World Tour
- October 24-26, 2025 - Mayday, #5525 Back to That Day Tour
- October 31, November 1, 7-8, 2026 - Joker Xue, The King of Beasts Tour

== See also ==
- List of football stadiums in China
- List of stadiums in China
- Lists of stadiums
