= Tadese Takele =

Ethiopian athlete

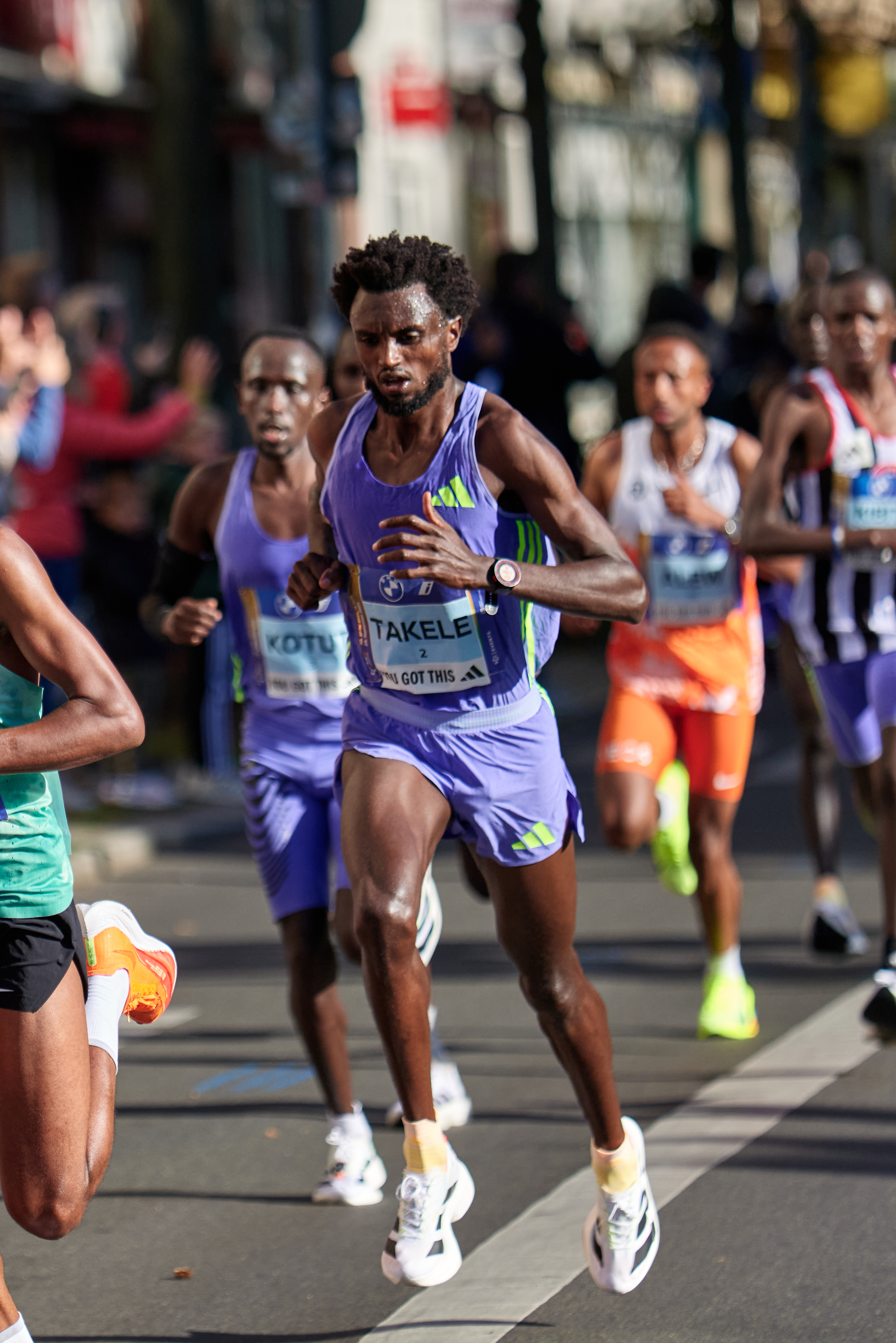
- Takele in 2024

Personal information
- Nationality: Ethiopian
- Born: Tadese Takele Bikila; 3 August 2002 (age 24)

Sport
- Sport: Track and Field
- Event: Steeplechase

Achievements and titles
- Personal bests: 3000 m steeplechase: 8:09.37 (Hengelo 2021); 10K: 27:20 (Lille 2022); Half marathon: 59:41 (Herzogenaurach 2022); Marathon: 2:03:23 (Tokyo 2025)
Medal record
Men's Athletics
Representing Ethiopia
World U20 Championships
| Silver medal – second place | 2021 Nairobi | 3000 m steeplechase |
African Championships
| Silver medal – second place | 2022 Port Louis | 3000 m steeplechase |
World Marathon Majors
| Gold medal – first place | 2026 Tokyo | Marathon |
| Gold medal – first place | 2025 Tokyo | Marathon |
| Silver medal – second place | 2026 Chicago | Marathon |
| Bronze medal – third place | 2023 Berlin | Marathon |

Tadese Takele Bikila (born 3 August 2002) is an Ethiopian long-distance runner. He is a two-time winner of the Tokyo Marathon, winning in 2025 and defending the title in 2026. Formerly a steeplechaser, he represented Ethiopia at the 2020 Olympic Games and won silver medals in the 3000 metres steeplechase at the 2021 World U20 Championships and 2022 African Championships.

== Career ==
Takele won the Ethiopian Olympic Trial in June 2021 in the 3000m steeplechase, running a personal best of 8:09.37 to beat Abrham Sime and Hailemariyam Amare. Later that month, he finished second behind Soufiane El Bakkali in steeplechase in the Diamond League meeting in Florence, running 8:10.56. Competing at the delayed 2020 Olympic Games in the 3000 metres steeplechase in August 2021, he finished ninth in heat three. Later that month, he competed at the 2021 World Athletics U20 Championships in the 3000 metres steeplechase, in Nairobi, Kenya, where he won the silver medal in 8.33.15, behind Amos Serem of Kenya but ahead of fellow Kenyan Simon Kiprop Koech.

Takele also won a silver medal in the 3000 metres steeplechase at the 2022 African Championships in Mauritius, running 8:28.31 to finish behind compatriot Hailemariyam Amare. He made his marathon debut at the 2023 Berlin Marathon, where he finished third with a time of 2:03:24, an all-time world-best for an U23 athlete.

At the 2025 Tokyo Marathon, he finished first with a time of 2:03:23. This was the fifth-fastest time ever recorded in the Tokyo Marathon, and he won the race ahead of Kenyan Deresa Geleta. He represented Ethiopia in the marathon at the 2025 World Athletics Championships, in Tokyo in September 2025.

On 1 March 2026, he successfully defended his title at the 2026 Tokyo Marathon in a three-way sprint finish with Geoffrey Toroitich and Alexander Mutiso, with both Takele and Toroitich running 2:03:37 and Mutiso a second slower in third.
