= 2026 African Championships in Athletics – Men's 3000 metres steeplechase =

Men's 3000 metres steeplechase at the 2026 African Championships in Athletics
- Venue: Legon Sports Stadium
- Location: Accra, Ghana
- Dates: 14 May
- Competitors: 11 from 6 nations
- Winning time: 8:38.37

Medalists
gold medal	Gemechu Godana	Ethiopia
silver medal	Salah Eddine Ben Yazide	Morocco
bronze medal	Samuel Firewu	Ethiopia

The men's 3000 metres steeplechase event at the 2026 African Championships in Athletics was held on 14 May in Accra, Ghana.

== Results ==
Rank	Athlete	Nationality	Time	Notes
1st place, gold medalist(s)	Gemechu Godana	Ethiopia	8:38.37	
2nd place, silver medalist(s)	Salah Eddine Ben Yazide	Morocco	8:41.02	
3rd place, bronze medalist(s)	Samuel Firewu	Ethiopia	8:41.67	
4	Shadrack Kibiwot	Kenya	8:42.05	
5	Mohamed Tindouft	Morocco	8:42.12	
6	Leonard Chemutai	Uganda	8:45.03	
7	Peter Rono	Kenya	8:46.67	
8	Milkesa Fikadu	Ethiopia	8:47.74	
9	Amos Serem	Kenya	8:53.76	
10	Lopang Oontse	Botswana	9:10.58	
11	Sadio Fenner	Ivory Coast	9:33.54	
