= 2024 Bauhausgalan =

- Dates: 2 June 2024
- Host city: Stockholm, Sweden
- Venue: Stockholm Olympic Stadium
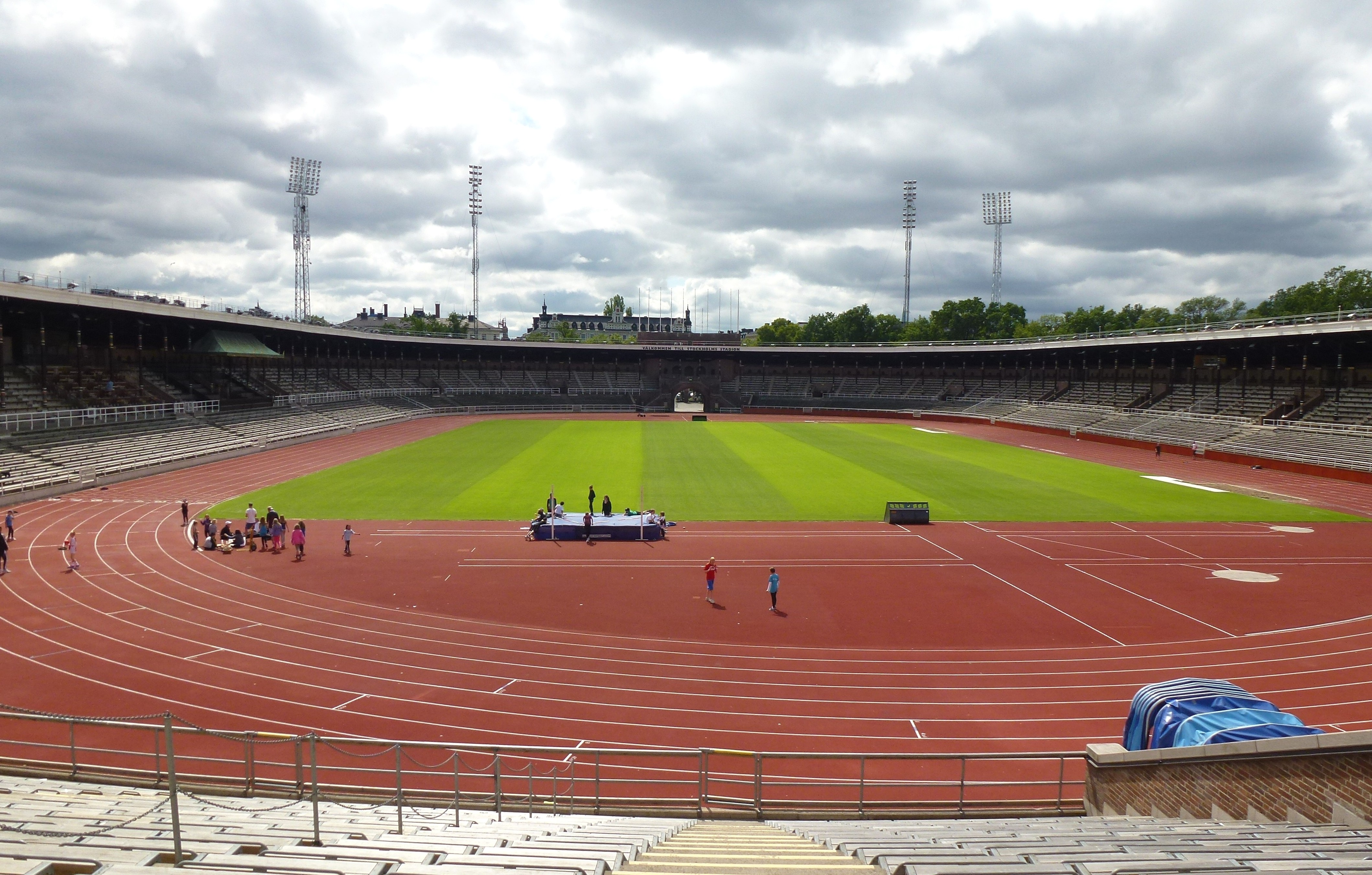
- Level: 2024 Diamond League

The 2024 Bauhausgalan was the 58th edition of the annual outdoor track and field meeting in Stockholm, Sweden. Held on 2 June at Stockholm Olympic Stadium, it was the seventh leg of the 2024 Diamond League – the highest level international track and field circuit.

== Results ==
Athletes competing in the Diamond League disciplines earned extra compensation and points which went towards qualifying for the 2024 Diamond League finals. First place earned 8 points, with each step down in place earning one less point than the previous, until no points are awarded in 9th place or lower. In the case of a tie, each tying athlete earns the full amount of points for the place.

=== Diamond Discipline ===
Men's 100 Metres (−1.0 m/s)
Place	Athlete	Age	Country	Time	Points
1st place, gold medalist(s)	Emmanuel Eseme	30	Cameroon	10.16	8
2nd place, silver medalist(s)	Kyree King	29	United States	10.18	7
3rd place, bronze medalist(s)	Chituru Ali	25	Italy	10.19	6
4	Ryiem Forde	23	Jamaica	10.22	5
5	Abdul Hakim Sani Brown	25	Japan	10.28	4
6	Joshua Hartmann	24	Germany	10.30	3
7	Henrik Larsson	24	Sweden	10.47	2
8	Yupun Abeykoon	29	Sri Lanka	10.63	1

Men's 800 Metres
Place	Athlete	Age	Country	Time	Points
1st place, gold medalist(s)	Djamel Sedjati	25	Algeria	1:43.23	8
2nd place, silver medalist(s)	Bryce Hoppel	26	United States	1:44.29	7
3rd place, bronze medalist(s)	Tshepiso Masalela	25	Botswana	1:44.44	6
4	Ben Pattison	22	Great Britain	1:44.44	5
5	Benjamin Robert	26	France	1:44.73	4
6	Elliot Giles	30	Great Britain	1:45.10	3
7	Andreas Kramer	27	Sweden	1:45.27	2
8	Jake Wightman	29	Great Britain	1:45.35	1
9	Slimane Moula	25	Algeria	1:48.02	
	Patryk Sieradzki	25	Poland	DNF	

Men's 3000 Metres
Place	Athlete	Age	Country	Time	Points
1st place, gold medalist(s)	Narve Gilje Nordås	25	Norway	7:33.49	8
2nd place, silver medalist(s)	Dominic Lokinyomo Lobalu	25	Switzerland	7:33.68	7
3rd place, bronze medalist(s)	Luis Grijalva	25	Guatemala	7:33.96	6
4	Andreas Almgren	28	Sweden	7:34.28	5
5	Mohamed Ismail Ibrahim	27	Djibouti	7:36.29	4
6	Adriaan Wildschutt	26	South Africa	7:36.77	3
7	Stewart McSweyn	29	Australia	7:36.78	2
8	Adel Mechaal	33	Spain	7:37.28	1
9	Mezgebu Sime	18	Ethiopia	7:39.40	
10	Sam Parsons	29	Germany	7:40.01	
11	Birhanu Balew	28	Bahrain	7:46.10	
12	Emil Danielsson	26	Sweden	7:49.03	
13	Telahun Haile Bekele	25	Ethiopia	7:50.13	
	Adam Czerwiński	35	Poland	DNF	
	Jack Rowe	28	Great Britain	DNF	
	Jude Thomas	22	Australia	DNF	

Men's 400 Metres Hurdles
Place	Athlete	Age	Country	Time	Points
1st place, gold medalist(s)	Alison dos Santos	23	Brazil	47.01	8
2nd place, silver medalist(s)	Kyron McMaster	27	British Virgin Islands	48.05	7
3rd place, bronze medalist(s)	CJ Allen	29	United States	48.12	6
4	Carl Bengtström	24	Sweden	48.72	5
5	Rasmus Mägi	32	Estonia	48.72	4
6	Matic Ian Guček	20	Slovenia	49.13	3
7	Abderrahman Samba	28	Qatar	49.69	2
8	Bassem Hemeida	24	Qatar	50.38	1

Men's 3000 Metres Steeplechase
Place	Athlete	Age	Country	Time	Points
1st place, gold medalist(s)	Lamecha Girma	23	Ethiopia	8:01.63	8
2nd place, silver medalist(s)	Samuel Firewu	20	Ethiopia	8:05.78	7
3rd place, bronze medalist(s)	Mohamed Amin Jhinaoui	27	Tunisia	8:10.41	6
4	Getnet Wale	23	Ethiopia	8:10.73	5
5	Mohamed Tindouft	31	Morocco	8:14.15	4
6	Geordie Beamish	27	New Zealand	8:14.71	3
7	Hillary Bor	34	United States	8:15.53	2
8	Jean-Simon Desgagnés	25	Canada	8:15.95	1
9	Emil Blomberg	32	Sweden	8:16.94	
10	Simon Sundström	26	Sweden	8:17.15	
11	Samuel Duguna	20	Ethiopia	8:20.49	
12	Vidar Johansson	27	Sweden	8:23.99	
13	Leo Magnusson	26	Sweden	8:24.91	
	Lawrence Kemboi	30	Kenya	DNF	
	Wilberforce Chemiat Kones	30	Kenya	DNF	

Men's Pole Vault
Place	Athlete	Age	Country	Mark	Points
1st place, gold medalist(s)	Armand Duplantis	24	Sweden	6.00 m	8
2nd place, silver medalist(s)	Sam Kendricks	31	United States	5.90 m	7
3rd place, bronze medalist(s)	KC Lightfoot	24	United States	5.80 m	6
4	Thibaut Collet	24	France	5.70 m	5
4	Clayton Fritsch	25	United States	5.70 m	5
6	Ben Broeders	28	Belgium	5.70 m	3
7	EJ Obiena	28	Philippines	5.70 m	2
8	Chris Nilsen	26	United States	5.40 m	1

Men's Discus Throw
Place	Athlete	Age	Country	Mark	Points
1st place, gold medalist(s)	Mykolas Alekna	21	Lithuania	68.64 m	8
2nd place, silver medalist(s)	Matthew Denny	28	Australia	66.75 m	7
3rd place, bronze medalist(s)	Daniel Ståhl	31	Sweden	66.10 m	6
4	Henrik Janssen	26	Germany	65.85 m	5
5	Lukas Weißhaidinger	32	Austria	65.43 m	4
6	Fedrick Dacres	30	Jamaica	64.21 m	3
7	Andrius Gudžius	33	Lithuania	64.07 m	2
8	Simon Pettersson	30	Sweden	59.55 m	1

Women's 100 Metres (−0.8 m/s)
Place	Athlete	Age	Country	Time	Points
1st place, gold medalist(s)	Gina Mariam Bass Bittaye	29	Gambia	11.15	8
2nd place, silver medalist(s)	Marie-Josée Ta Lou	35	Ivory Coast	11.16	7
3rd place, bronze medalist(s)	Brittany Brown	29	United States	11.18	6
4	Zaynab Dosso	24	Italy	11.23	5
5	Julia Henriksson	23	Sweden	11.37	4
6	Boglárka Takács	22	Hungary	11.40	3
7	Natasha Morrison	31	Jamaica	11.41	2
8	Olga Safronova	32	Kazakhstan	11.65	1

Women's 200 Metres (−2.0 m/s)
Place	Athlete	Age	Country	Time	Points
1st place, gold medalist(s)	Shericka Jackson	29	Jamaica	22.69	8
2nd place, silver medalist(s)	Julia Henriksson	23	Sweden	22.89	7
3rd place, bronze medalist(s)	Amy Hunt	22	Great Britain	22.92	6
4	Anavia Battle	25	United States	22.98	5
5	Maboundou Koné	27	Ivory Coast	23.04	4
6	Tasa Jiya	26	Netherlands	23.25	3
7	Jenna Prandini	31	United States	23.31	2

Women's 1500 Metres
Place	Athlete	Age	Country	Time	Points
1st place, gold medalist(s)	Laura Muir	31	Great Britain	3:57.99	8
2nd place, silver medalist(s)	Edinah Jebitok	22	Kenya	3:58.88	7
3rd place, bronze medalist(s)	Georgia Griffith	27	Australia	3:59.17	6
4	Birke Haylom	18	Ethiopia	3:59.84	5
5	Dani Jones	27	United States	4:00.64	4
6	Revée Walcott-Nolan	29	Great Britain	4:00.77	3
7	Linden Hall	32	Australia	4:01.01	2
8	Cory McGee	32	United States	4:02.64	1
9	Nozomi Tanaka	24	Japan	4:02.98	
10	Sintayehu Vissa	27	Italy	4:03.36	
11	Hanna Hermansson	35	Sweden	4:07.85	
12	Sarah Billings	26	Australia	4:10.21	
	Julia Jaguścik	20	Poland	DNF	
	Sarah McDonald	30	Great Britain	DNF	

Women's 400 Metres Hurdles
Place	Athlete	Age	Country	Time	Points
1st place, gold medalist(s)	Femke Bol	24	Netherlands	53.07	8
2nd place, silver medalist(s)	Rushell Clayton	31	Jamaica	53.78	7
3rd place, bronze medalist(s)	Andrenette Knight	27	Jamaica	54.62	6
4	Janieve Russell	30	Jamaica	54.99	5
5	Anna Ryzhykova	34	Ukraine	55.64	4
6	Ayomide Folorunso	27	Italy	55.99	3
7	Cathelijn Peeters	27	Netherlands	56.03	2
8	Moa Granat	19	Sweden	56.65	1

Women's High Jump
Place	Athlete	Age	Country	Mark	Points
1st place, gold medalist(s)	Yaroslava Mahuchikh	22	Ukraine	2.00 m	8
2nd place, silver medalist(s)	Imke Onnen	29	Germany	1.94 m	7
3rd place, bronze medalist(s)	Iryna Herashchenko	29	Ukraine	1.94 m	6
4	Nicola Olyslagers	27	Australia	1.94 m	5
5	Eleanor Patterson	28	Australia	1.90 m	4
6	Mirela Demireva	34	Bulgaria	1.90 m	3
7	Lia Apostolovski	23	Slovenia	1.86 m	2
7	Maja Nilsson	24	Sweden	1.86 m	2
9	Yuliya Levchenko	26	Ukraine	1.82 m	

Women's Triple Jump
Place	Athlete	Age	Country	Mark	Points
1st place, gold medalist(s)	Leyanis Pérez	22	Cuba	14.67 m (+1.4 m/s)	8
2nd place, silver medalist(s)	Shanieka Ricketts	32	Jamaica	14.40 m (−1.0 m/s)	7
3rd place, bronze medalist(s)	Thea LaFond	30	Dominica	14.26 m (−1.0 m/s)	6
4	Tuğba Danışmaz	24	Turkey	13.95 m (+0.3 m/s)	5
5	Maja Åskag	21	Sweden	13.78 m (−0.3 m/s)	4
6	Keturah Orji	28	United States	13.75 m (−0.4 m/s)	3
7	Neja Filipič	29	Slovenia	13.74 m (−0.9 m/s)	2
8	Emilia Sjöstrand	22	Sweden	13.55 m (−1.2 m/s)	1
9	Kimberly Williams	35	Jamaica	13.48 m (−0.7 m/s)	

Women's Shot Put
Place	Athlete	Age	Country	Mark	Points
1st place, gold medalist(s)	Chase Jackson	29	United States	20.00 m	8
2nd place, silver medalist(s)	Sarah Mitton	27	Canada	19.98 m	7
3rd place, bronze medalist(s)	Jessica Schilder	25	Netherlands	19.08 m	6
4	Song Jiayuan	26	China	18.87 m	5
5	Danniel Thomas-Dodd	31	Jamaica	18.77 m	4
6	Fanny Roos	29	Sweden	18.50 m	3
7	Sara Lennman	28	Sweden	18.28 m	2
8	Maggie Ewen	29	United States	18.27 m	1
9	Jorinde van Klinken	24	Netherlands	18.13 m	

=== Promotional events ===
Men's 1500 Metres
Place	Athlete	Age	Country	Time
1st place, gold medalist(s)	Robert Farken	26	Germany	3:33.53
2nd place, silver medalist(s)	Luke McCann	26	Ireland	3:33.66
3rd place, bronze medalist(s)	Federico Riva	23	Italy	3:33.87
4	Maël Gouyette	25	France	3:34.12
5	Samuel Pihlström	23	Sweden	3:34.51
6	Ossama Meslek	27	Italy	3:34.69
7	Charles Philibert-Thiboutot	33	Canada	3:34.95
8	Noah Baltus	22	Netherlands	3:35.07
9	Hafid Rizqy	26	Morocco	3:35.14
10	Teddese Lemi	25	Ethiopia	3:35.24
11	Adam Fogg	25	Great Britain	3:35.50
12	Jonathan Grahn	19	Sweden	3:38.02
13	Charles Grethen	32	Luxembourg	3:45.36
	Boaz Kiprugut	26	Kenya	DNF
	Žan Rudolf	31	Slovenia	DNF

Women's 800 Metres
Place	Athlete	Age	Country	Time
1st place, gold medalist(s)	Jemma Reekie	26	Great Britain	1:57.79
2nd place, silver medalist(s)	Vivian Chebet Kiprotich	28	Kenya	1:58.64
3rd place, bronze medalist(s)	Eveliina Määttänen	28	Finland	1:59.59
4	Nigist Getachew	22	Ethiopia	1:59.77
5	Yolanda Ngarambe	32	Sweden	2:01.32
6	Noélie Yarigo	38	Benin	2:02.26
7	Julia Nielsen	23	Sweden	2:02.37
8	Wilma Nielsen	23	Sweden	2:03.10
	Agata Kołakowska	26	Poland	DNF

=== National events ===
Men's 100 Metres (−1.6 m/s)
Place	Athlete	Age	Country	Time
1st place, gold medalist(s)	Yupun Abeykoon	29	Sri Lanka	10.22
2nd place, silver medalist(s)	Coby Hilton	26	United States	10.33
3rd place, bronze medalist(s)	Jerome Blake	28	Canada	10.44
4	Isak Hughes	18	Sweden	10.56
5	Linus Pihl	20	Sweden	10.65
6	Desmond Rogo	28	Sweden	10.72
7	Simon Plesse	22	Sweden	10.73
8	Thomas Jones	22	Sweden	10.75

Men's 400 Metres
Place	Athlete	Age	Country	Time
1st place, gold medalist(s)	Quincy Hall	25	United States	44.68
2nd place, silver medalist(s)	Vernon Norwood	32	United States	44.80
3rd place, bronze medalist(s)	Zakithi Nene	26	South Africa	45.29
4	Leungo Scotch	28	Botswana	45.60
5	William Trulsson	18	Sweden	46.97
6	Marcus Tornée	26	Sweden	47.32
7	Emil Johansson	21	Sweden	47.62
8	Gustav Gahne	23	Sweden	49.19

Women's 100 Metres (−0.3 m/s)
Place	Athlete	Age	Country	Time
1st place, gold medalist(s)	Maboundou Koné	27	Ivory Coast	11.33
2nd place, silver medalist(s)	Olga Safronova	32	Kazakhstan	11.58
3rd place, bronze medalist(s)	Elvira Tanderud	20	Sweden	11.69
4	Olivia Lundberg	18	Sweden	11.78
5	Esther Sahlqvist	18	Sweden	11.86
6	Ayla Hallberg Hossain	17	Sweden	11.91
	Ángela Tenorio	28	Ecuador	DQ

Women's 400 Metres
Place	Athlete	Age	Country	Time
1st place, gold medalist(s)	Alexis Holmes	24	United States	51.18
2nd place, silver medalist(s)	Zenéy Geldenhuys	24	South Africa	52.12
3rd place, bronze medalist(s)	Sophie Becker	27	Ireland	52.17
4	Lisanne de Witte	31	Netherlands	52.17
5	Linnéa Frobe	25	Sweden	54.03
6	Jonna Claesson	24	Sweden	54.57
7	Moa Hjelmer	33	Sweden	54.79
8	Josephine Risberg Thoor	28	Sweden	55.55

== See also ==
- 2024 Diamond League
