= 2024 African Championships in Athletics – Men's 3000 metres steeplechase =

Men's 3000 metres steeplechase at the 2024 African Championships in Athletics
- Venue: Japoma Stadium
- Location: Douala, Cameroon
- Dates: 23 June
- Competitors: 8 from 5 nations
- Winning time: 8:21.30

Medalists
gold medal	Leonard Chemutai	Uganda
silver medal	Edmund Serem	Kenya
bronze medal	Matthew Kosgei	Kenya

The men's 3000 metres steeplechase event at the 2024 African Championships in Athletics was held on 23 June in Douala, Cameroon.

== Records ==
Records before the 2024 African Athletics Championships
Record	Athlete (nation)	Time (s)	Location	Date
World record	Lamecha Girma (ETH)	7:52.11	Paris, France	9 June 2023
African record	Lamecha Girma (ETH)	7:52.11	Paris, France	9 June 2023
Championship record	Paul Kipsiele Koech (KEN)	8:11.03	Bambous, Mauritius	11 August 2006
World leading	Lamecha Girma (ETH)	8:01.63	Stockholm, Sweden	2 June 2024
African leading	Lamecha Girma (ETH)	8:01.63	Stockholm, Sweden	2 June 2024

== Results ==
Rank	Athlete	Nationality	Time	Notes
1st place, gold medalist(s)	Leonard Chemutai	Uganda	8:21.30	
2nd place, silver medalist(s)	Edmund Serem	Kenya	8:21.94	
3rd place, bronze medalist(s)	Matthew Kosgei	Kenya	8:21.98	
4	Hailemariyam Amare	Ethiopia	8:23.76	
5	Collins Kiprop	Kenya	8:29.06	
6	Hirko Hayilu	Ethiopia	8:35.59	
7	Bilal Tabti	Algeria	8:41.68	
8	Elphas Toroitich	Uganda	8:43.91	
	Hicham Bouchicha	Algeria	DNS	
	Samuel Duguna	Ethiopia	DNS	

== See also ==
- Athletics at the 2023 African Games – Men's 3000 metres steeplechase
