= Abraham Kibiwot =

Kenyan steeplechase runner

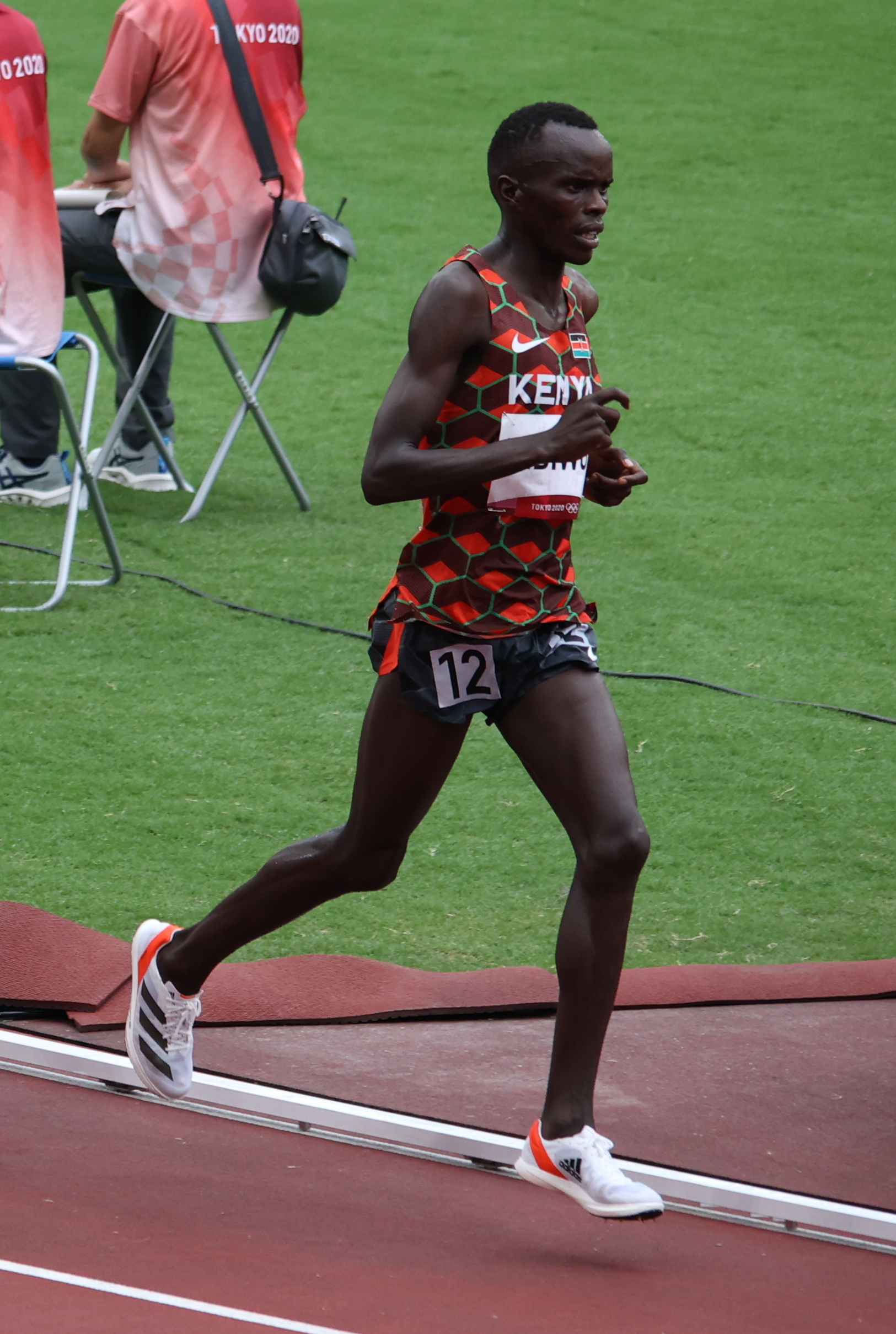
- Kibiwot at the 2020 Summer Olympics

Personal information
- Born: 4 June 1996 (age 30) Uasin Gishu, Kenya

Sport
- Sport: Track and field
- Event: 3000 metres steeplechase
Medal record
Men's athletics
Representing Kenya
Olympic Games
Bronze medal – third place	2024 Paris	3000 m st.
World Championships
Bronze medal – third place	2023 Budapest	3000 m st.
African Championships
Bronze medal – third place	2016 Durban	3000 m st.
Commonwealth Games
Gold medal – first place	2022 Birmingham	3000 m st.
Silver medal – second place	2018 Gold Coast	3000 m st.

Abraham Kibiwot (born 4 June 1996) is a Kenyan steeplechase runner. He won bronze medals in the 3000 m steeplechase at the 2024 Summer Olympics, 2023 World Championships, and 2016 African Championships. His personal best is 8:05.51 minutes, set in 2023.

== Career ==
Kibiwot made his international debut at the 2013 African Youth Athletics Championships, taking fifth in the 2000 m steeplechase event.

He raised his profile in 2015 first by winning the Kenyan junior trials and the gold medal at the 2015 African Junior Athletics Championships, seeing off Ethiopia's reigning Youth Olympic champion Wogene Sebisibe Sidamo in Addis Ababa. Kibiwot capped that season with a personal best of 8:22.10 at the London Diamond League meet and ranked as the second-fastest under-20 athlete that year behind another Kenyan, Nicholas Kiptanui Bett.

Kibiwot made his breakthrough into the senior ranks in the 2016 season. That year he was prominent on the 2016 Diamond League, starting with a personal best of 8:09.25 to place third in Doha. He finished second behind Ezekiel Kemboi in Beijing and won his first race at Athletissima in Lausanne. He also took fifth place at the Herculis and Memorial Van Damme meets. Kibiwot ran at the 2016 Athletics Kenya Olympic Trials but withdrew from the final. He was selected for the 2016 African Championships in Athletics, where he won his first major medal – a bronze behind Ethiopia's Chala Beyo and Tolosa Nurgi.

At the 2024 Paris Olympics, Kibiwot earned a bronze medal in the 3000 m steeplechase. At 8:06.47, he finished six hundredths of a second behind American Kenneth Rooks.

== Personal bests ==
- 3000 metres – 7:56.05 (2021)
- 5000 metres – 14:10.8 (2015)
- 2000 metres steeplechase – 5:53.90 (2013)
- 3000 metres steeplechase – 8:05.51 (2023)

Information from All-Athletics profile

== International competitions ==
Year	Competition	Venue	Position	Event	Notes
2013	African Youth Championships	Warri, Nigeria	5th	2000 m s'chase	5:53.90
2015	African Junior Championships	Addis Ababa, Ethiopia	1st	3000 m s'chase	8:47.43
2016	African Championships	Durban, South Africa	3rd	3000 m s'chase	8:24.19
2018	Commonwealth Games	Gold Coast, Australia	2nd	3000 m s'chase	8:10.62
2019	World Championships	Doha, Qatar	7th	3000 m s'chase	8:08.52
2021	Olympic Games	Tokyo, Japan	10th	3000 m s'chase	8:19.41
2022	World Championships	Eugene, United States	5th	3000 m s'chase	8:28.95
2023	World Championships	Budapest, Hungary	3rd	3000 m s'chase	8:11.98
2024	Olympic Games	Saint Denis, France	3rd	3000 m s'chase	8:06.47

=== Circuit wins ===
- Athletissima: 2016
