= Athletics at the 2024 Summer Olympics – Men's 3000 metres steeplechase =

Men's 3000 metres steeplechase at the Games of the XXXIII Olympiad
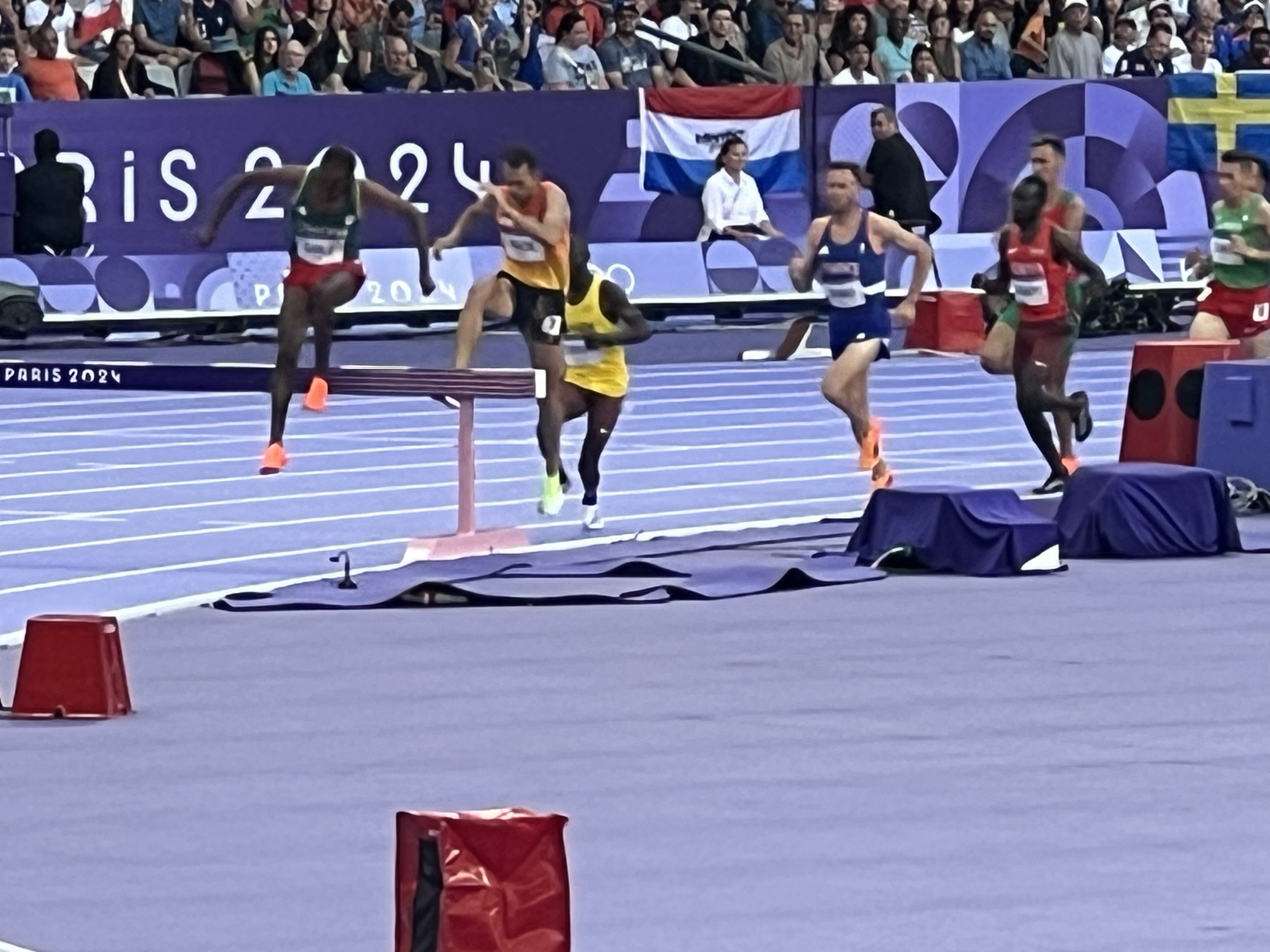
- A heat of the men's 3000 metres steeplechase at the 2024 Summer Olympics in Paris.
- Venue: Stade de France, Paris, France
- Dates: 5 August 2024 (round 1); 7 August 2024 (final)
- Competitors: 36
- Winning time: 8:06.05

Medalists
1st place, gold medalist(s)		Soufiane El Bakkali	Morocco
2nd place, silver medalist(s)		Kenneth Rooks	United States
3rd place, bronze medalist(s)		Abraham Kibiwot	Kenya

The men's 3000 metres steeplechase at the 2024 Summer Olympics was held in four rounds at the Stade de France in Paris, France, on 5 and 7 August 2024. This was 24th time that the men's 3000 metres steeplechase was contested at the Summer Olympics. A total of 36 athletes were able to qualify for the event by entry standard or ranking.

== Summary ==
Soufiane El Bakkali was the defending Olympic champion and winner of the 2022 and 2023 World Championships in the event. The returning silver medalist Lamecha Girma had a longer string of silvers going back to 2019. In 2023, Girma set the world record. On all recent podiums with these two had been Kenyans, primarily 2016 champion and Olympic record holder Conseslus Kipruto, who did not return. The Kenyan team sent two new entrants, Amos Serem and Simon Koech, along with 2023 bronze medalist Abraham Kibiwot to try to restore their historical dominance.

Since 2016, El Bakkali had been a player in the major championship races. With that experience, he learned it is not productive to be part of the fray until it counts and held back over the first few laps. With three qualifiers each, the Kenyan and Ethiopian rivalry was in full effect. As things sorted out in the final, Avinash Sable ended up in the lead. Nobody challenged, letting Sable get a couple of steps in front. After a lap and a half, Ethiopian Getnet Wale moved to the lead, with his teammate Samuel Firewu moving forward. Girma moved to join his teammates. El Bakkali, expecting Girma to be his main competition, stayed in position to mark his every move. When Girma joined his teammates, El Bakkali came along for the ride.

With just under three laps to go, Simon Koech put Kenya in front, but the difference to the back of the pack was very little, at times three rows four abreast across the track. El Bakkali's Moroccan teammate Mohamed Tindouft took the lead with a lap and a half left. Then, with 500 metres to go, American Kenneth Rooks, who had been near the back of the pack in the early goings, accelerated down the home stretch to reach the front just after the bell. Rooks' bold move surprised the field and started to open up the race. Speeding over the barrier at the beginning of the backstretch, frequently the deciding point in these championship races, Rooks opened up a five-metre lead on Firewu and Kibiwot, who had started the traditional press at the barrier. El Bakkali and Girma accelerated next to each other right behind them, El Bakkali on the outside. Girma sprinted ahead of El Bakkali and Kibiwot going into the next barrier, 200 metres before the finish. Going over in full flight, Girma hooked his trail leg on the barrier, flipped over, and fell, hitting the back of his head on the ground. The tall world record holder's body laid motionless across two lanes of the track at the base of the important barrier before the final water jump. El Bakkali was wide going over in pursuit and avoided a collision with Girma. Kibiwot hurdled the body, and then everyone else in the field had to react, go wide, or hurdle the body as well. Three were separated off the front to race for the medals. Rooks was still two metres ahead of El Bakkali and Kibiwot, but they were gaining fast. The long-striding El Bakkali passed Rooks as they entered the final straightaway. While going over the last barrier, the group of three tightened, but El Bakkali was still in front. They sprinted for the finish. El Bakkali pulled away to win the gold medal, and though Kibiwot gained ground, Rooks was able to hold him off for silver.

Girma was stretchered off the track in a neck brace, unconscious from hitting his head on the track, and taken to a hospital, where he regained consciousness and was able to speak. El Bakkali became the first man to successfully defend his Olympic title in this event. Rooks ran nine seconds faster than his personal best to get the unexpected silver medal.

== Background ==
The men's 3000 metres steeplechase has been present on the Olympic athletics programme since 1920.

Global records before the 2024 Summer Olympics
Record	Athlete (Nation)	Time (s)	Location	Date
World record	Lamecha Girma (ETH)	7:52.11	Paris, France	9 June 2023
Olympic record	Conseslus Kipruto (KEN)	8:03.28	Rio de Janeiro, Brazil	17 August 2016
World leading	Lamecha Girma (ETH)	8:01.63	Stockholm, Sweden	2 June 2024

Area records before the 2024 Summer Olympics
Area Record	Athlete (Nation)	Time (s)
Africa (records)	Lamecha Girma (ETH)	7:52.11 WR
Asia (records)	Saif Shaheen (QAT)	7:53.63
Europe (records)	Mahiedine Mekhissi (FRA)	8:00.09
North, Central America and Caribbean (records)	Evan Jager (USA)	8:00.45
Oceania (records)	Geordie Beamish (NZL)	8:09.64
South America (records)	Wander Moura (BRA)	8:14.41

== Qualification ==
For the men's 3000 metres steeplechase event, the qualification period was between 1 July 2023 and 30 June 2024. 36 athletes were able to qualify for the event, with a maximum of three athletes per nation, by running the entry standard of 8:15.00 seconds or faster or by their World Athletics Ranking for this event.

== Results ==
=== Round 1 ===
Round 1 was held on 5 August, starting at 19:04 (UTC+2).

==== Heat 1 ====
Results
Rank	Athlete	Nation	Time	Notes
1	Soufiane El Bakkali	Morocco	8:17.90	Q
2	Leonard Chemutai	Uganda	8:18.19	Q, SB
3	Getnet Wale	Ethiopia	8:18.25	Q
4	Daniel Arce	Spain	8:18.31	Q
5	Ahmed Jaziri	Tunisia	8:18.33	Q, SB
6	Amos Serem	Kenya	8:18.41	qR
7	Karl Bebendorf	Germany	8:20.46	
8	Nicolas-Marie Daru	France	8:20.52	
9	Ruben Querinjean	Luxembourg	8:27.97	
10	James Corrigan	United States	8:36.67	
11	Yassin Bouih	Italy	8:40.34	
12	Bilal Tabti	Algeria	9:04.81	

==== Heat 2 ====
Results
Rank	Athlete	Nation	Time	Notes
1	Mohamed Tindouft	Morocco	8:10.62	Q, PB
2	Samuel Firewu	Ethiopia	8:11.61	Q
3	Abraham Kibiwot	Kenya	8:12.02	Q
4	Ryuji Mira	Japan	8:12.41	Q
5	Avinash Sable	India	8:15.43	Q
6	Matthew Wilkinson	United States	8:16.82	
7	Nahuel Carabaña	Andorra	8:19.44	
8	Osama Zoghlami	Italy	8:20.52	
9	Alexis Miellet	France	8:22.08	
10	Velten Schneider	Germany	8:25.75	
11	Matthew Clarke	Australia	8:49.85	
	Tomáš Habarta	Czech Republic	DNF	

==== Heat 3 ====
Results
Rank	Athlete	Nation	Time	Notes
1	Lamecha Girma	Ethiopia	8:23.89	Q
2	Kenneth Rooks	United States	8:24.95 (.941)	Q
3	Simon Koech	Kenya	8:24.95 (.942)	Q
4	Mohamed Amin Jhinaoui	Tunisia	8:25.24	Q
5	Jean-Simon Desgagnés	Canada	8:25.28	Q
6	Frederik Ruppert	Germany	8:25.31	
7	Geordie Beamish	New Zealand	8:25.86	
8	Ryoma Aoki	Japan	8:29.03	
9	Louis Gilavert	France	8:29.16	
10	Ben Buckingham	Australia	8:32.12	
11	Topi Raitanen	Finland	8:33.12	
12	Faid El Mostafa	Morocco	8:39.48	

=== Final ===
The final was held on 7 August, starting at 21:43 (UTC+2).

Results
Rank	Athlete	Nation	Time	Notes
1st place, gold medalist(s)	Soufiane El Bakkali	Morocco	8:06.05	SB
2nd place, silver medalist(s)	Kenneth Rooks	United States	8:06.41	PB
3rd place, bronze medalist(s)	Abraham Kibiwot	Kenya	8:06.47	SB
4	Mohamed Amin Jhinaoui	Tunisia	8:07.73	NR
5	Ahmed Jaziri	Tunisia	8:08.02	PB
6	Samuel Firewu	Ethiopia	8:08.87	
7	Simon Koech	Kenya	8:09.87	SB
8	Ryuji Miura	Japan	8:11.72	
9	Getnet Wale	Ethiopia	8:12.33	
10	Daniel Arce	Spain	8:13.80	
11	Avinash Sable	India	8:14.18	
12	Mohamed Tindouft	Morocco	8:14.82	
13	Jean-Simon Desgagnés	Canada	8:19.31	
14	Amos Serem	Kenya	8:19.74	
15	Leonard Chemutai	Uganda	8:20.03	
	Lamecha Girma	Ethiopia	DNF	
