= Gemechu Godana =

Ethiopian runner (born 2005)

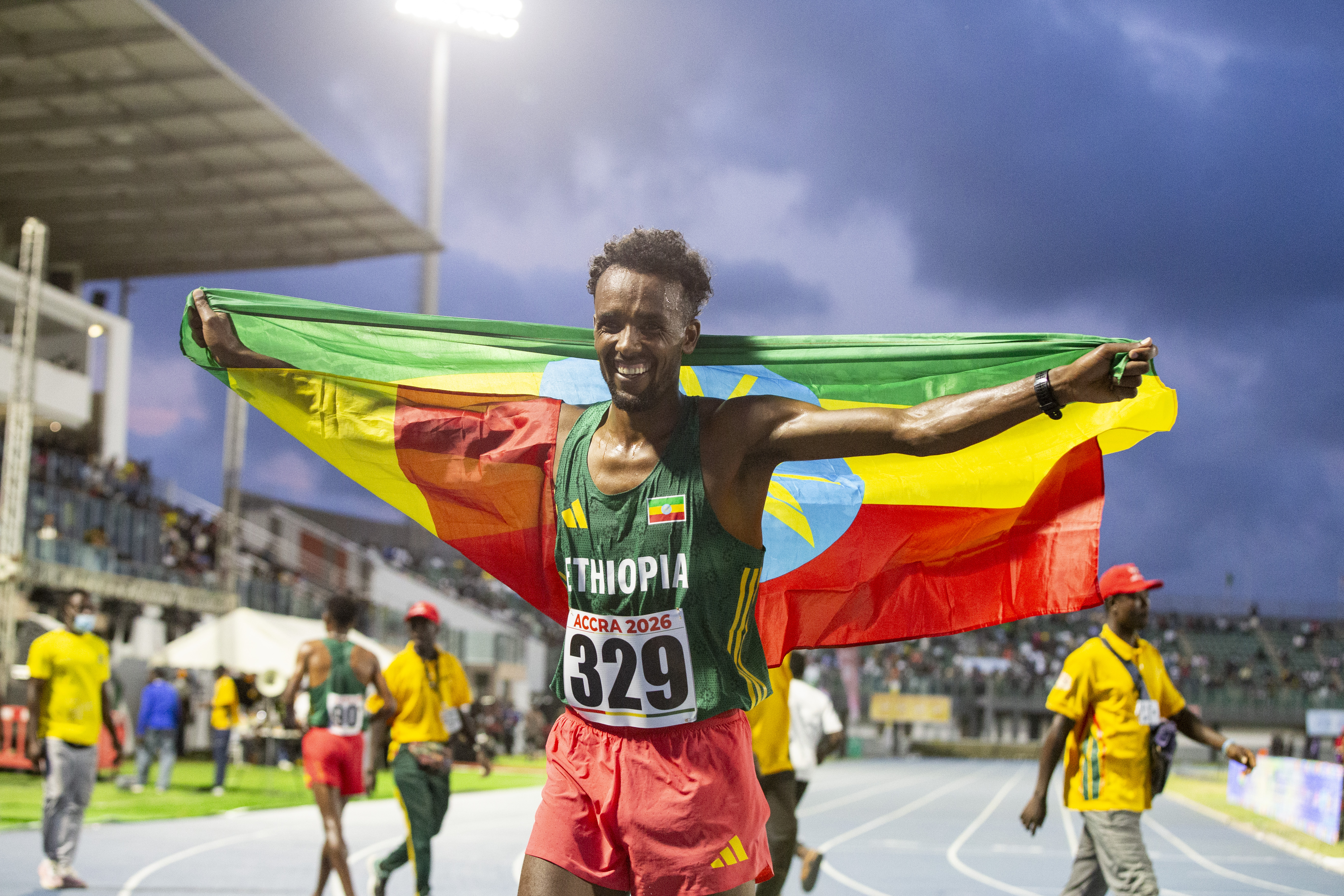
- Godana in 2026

Personal information
- Born: 30 September 2005 (age 21)

Sport
- Sport: Athletics
- Event: Steeplechase

Achievements and titles
- Personal bests: 3000m: 7:43.93 (2026); 3000m s'chase: 8:02.74 (2026); Road; 5k 13:02 (2026)
Medal record
Men's athletics
Representing Ethiopia
Diamond League
First place	2026 Brussels	3000 m s'chase
African Championships
Gold medal – first place	2026 Accra	3000 m s'chase

Gemechu Godana (born 30 September 2005) is an Ethiopian steeplechaser and middle-distance runner. He won the gold medal in the 3000 metres steeplechase at the 2026 African Championships and later also won the 2026 Diamond League Final.

== Biography ==
Competing in the 3000 metres steeplechase, Godana set a 8:31.82 personal best to place third at the 2025 Kip Keino Classic in Nairobi, Kenya.

Godana set a personal best in the 3000 metres indoors of 7:43.93 on 7 February 2026 in Moscow. On 4 April 2026, Godana ran a personal best in the 5 Kilometres on the road of 13:02 in Lille, France, placing fourth overall. Competing at the 2026 Kip Keino Classic in Nairobi on 24 April, Godana set a meeting record and personal best of 8:14.55 to win the men's 3000m steeplechase, defeating former Diamond League champion Simon Koech.

He won the gold medal in the 3000 metres steeplechase at the African Championships in Accra, Ghana, in May 2026, winning ahead of Morocco's Salaheddine Ben Yazide in 8:38.37 with compatriot Samuel Firewu in bronze. On 28 June, competing in a steeplechase outside Africa for the first time, he placed second in a personal best 8:05.86 at the 2026 Meeting de Paris. On 23 August, Godana ran a 3000 m steeplechase personal best and meeting record of 8:02.74 to win ahead of Soufiane El Bakkali in the Diamond League at the 2026 Kamila Skolimowska Memorial in Silesia, Poland. At the 2026 Diamond League Final in Brussels on 5 September, he won the 3000 metres steeplechase title ahead of El Bakkali, running 8:08.67.
