= 2016 African Championships in Athletics – Men's 3000 metres steeplechase =

The men's 3000 metres steeplechase event at the 2016 African Championships in Athletics was held on 22 June in Kings Park Stadium.

== Results ==
Rank	Athlete	Nationality	Time	Notes
1st place, gold medalist(s)	Chala Beyo	Ethiopia	8:21.02	
2nd place, silver medalist(s)	Tolosa Nurgi	Ethiopia	8:22.79	
3rd place, bronze medalist(s)	Abraham Kibiwott	Kenya	8:24.19	
4	Phenus Kipleting	Kenya	8:26.11	
5	Hamid Ezzine	Morocco	8:29.36	
6	Jacob Araptany	Uganda	8:29.60	
7	Rantso Mokopane	South Africa	8:35.02	
8	Malek Ben Amor	Tunisia	8:47.31	
9	Abdalla Targan	Sudan	8:47.47	
10	Sesebo Matlapeng	Botswana	8:58.93	
11	Hossny Ismail Eisa	Sudan	9:08.99	
	Sibusiso Nyoni	Zimbabwe	DNS	
	Getnet Bayabl	Ethiopia	DNS	
