= 2024 World Athletics U20 Championships – Men's 3000 metres steeplechase =

Men's 3000 metres steeplechase at the 2024 World Athletics U20 Championships
- Venue: Estadio Atlético de la VIDENA
- Dates: 28 August 2024 (heats); 31 August 2024 (final)
- Competitors: 32 from 23 nations
- Winning time: 8:15.28

Medalists
gold medal	Edmund Serem	Kenya
silver medal	Matthew Kosgei	Kenya
bronze medal	Hailu Ayalew	Ethiopia

The men's 3000 metres steeplechase at the 2024 World Athletics U20 Championships was held at the Estadio Atlético de la VIDENA in Lima, Peru on 28 and 31 August 2024.

== Records ==
U20 standing records prior to the 2024 World Athletics U20 Championships were as follows:

Record	Athlete & Nationality	Mark	Location	Date
World U20 Record	Saif Saaeed Shaheen (KEN)	7:58.66	Brussels, Belgium	24 August 2001
Championship Record	Conseslus Kipruto (KEN)	8:06.10	Barcelona, Spain	15 July 2012
World U20 Leading	Edmund Serem (KEN)	8:20.05	Nairobi, Kenya	22 May 2024

== Results ==
=== Heats ===
The first 8 athletes in each heat (Q) qualified to the final.

==== Heat 1 ====
Rank	Athlete	Nation	Time	Notes
1	Matthew Kosgei	Kenya	8:24.64	Q
2	Berihum Moges	Ethiopia	8:30.92	Q, PB
3	Anes Djayahia	Algeria	8:39.10	Q, PB
4	Tetsu Sasaki	Japan	8:41.48	Q
5	Hosea Chemutai	Uganda	8:44.43	Q, PB
6	Sharuk Khan	India	8:45.12	Q, NU20R
7	Ishak Dahmani	France	8:46.83	Q
8	Nathan Houwaard	Netherlands	8:49.08	Q
9	Abdelwahed Aachour	Morocco	8:52.06	PB
10	Francesco Mazza	Italy	8:58.27	
11	Rayen Mejri	Tunisia	9:08.38	
12	Aarno Liebl	Switzerland	9:12.11	
13	Johannes Sandvik Bø	Norway	9:20.74	
14	Toby Chippendale	Australia	9:26.69	
15	Luke Knepp	United States	9:33.17	
–	Jakub Abramczyk	Poland	DNF	

==== Heat 2 ====
Rank	Athlete	Nation	Time	Notes
1	Edmund Serem	Kenya	8:46.56	Q
2	Hailu Ayalew	Ethiopia	8:48.14	Q
3	Wyatt Haughton	United States	8:59.09	Q
4	Soma Nagahara	Japan	8:59.44	Q
5	Ameur Ounadjela	Algeria	9:00.88	Q
6	Houssam Baba	Morocco	9:01.16	Q
7	Daniel Marák	Czech Republic	9:01.43	Q
8	Saif Zuidi	Tunisia	9:03.50	Q
9	Paul Walochny	Germany	9:04.45	
10	Andres Lara	Spain	9:07.21	
11	Alberto Pomini	Italy	9:07.38	
12	Benjámin Szabó	Hungary	9:14.71	
13	Cuma Özcan	Turkey	9:22.02	
14	Ranvir Singh	India	9:22.54	
15	Lizardo Huamani	Peru	9:34.23	
–	Mihai Alin Șavlovschi	Romania	DNF	
–	Krzysztof Zieliński	Poland	DNS	

=== Final ===
Rank	Athlete	Nation	Time	Notes
1st place, gold medalist(s)	Edmund Serem	Kenya	8:15.28	WU20L
2nd place, silver medalist(s)	Matthew Kosgei	Kenya	8:17.46	PB
3rd place, bronze medalist(s)	Hailu Ayalew	Ethiopia	8:24.08	PB
4	Berihun Moges	Ethiopia	8:25.45	PB
5	Soma Nagahara	Japan	8:30.37	PB
6	Wyatt Haughton	United States	8:38.34	PB
7	Hosea Chemutai	Uganda	8:39.59	PB
8	Ishak Dahmani	France	8:39.79	PB
9	Anes Djayahia	Algeria	8:40.67	
10	Sharuk Khan	India	8:42.06	NU20R
11	Ameur Ounadjela	Algeria	8:47.12	PB
12	Saif Zuidi	Tunisia	8:48.70	
13	Nathan Houwaard	Netherlands	8:51.32	
14	Daniel Marák	Czech Republic	8:51.75	PB
15	Houssam Baba	Morocco	8:58.66	PB
16	Tetsu Sasaki	Japan	9:16.20	
