= Samuel Firewu =

Ethiopian athlete (born 2004)

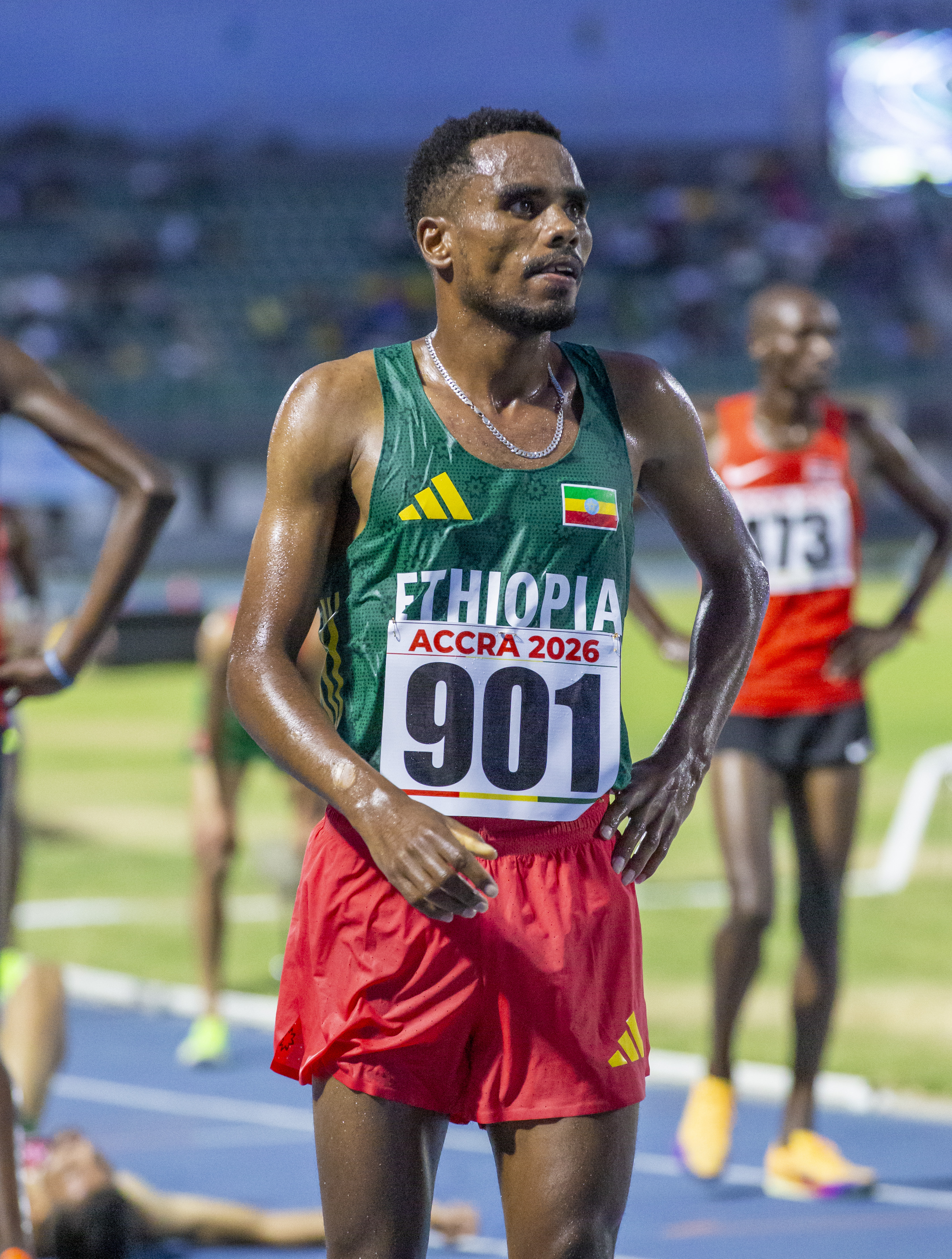

Personal information
- Full name: Samuel Firewu Fiche
- Nationality: Ethiopian
- Born: 3 May 2004 (age 22) Arbegona, Sidama Region, Ethiopia

Sport
- Sport: Athletics
- Event: 3000m steeplechase

Achievements and titles
- Personal bests: 3000m Steeplechase: 8:05.61 (Xiamen, 2025)
Medal record
Men's athletics
Representing Ethiopia
African Games
Gold medal – first place	2023 Accra	3000 m st.
African Championships
Bronze medal – third place	2026 Accra	3000 m s'chase
World U20 Championships
Silver medal – second place	2022 Cali	3000 m st.

Samuel Firewu Fiche (born 3 May 2004) is an Ethiopian track and field athlete. He finished second at the 2022 World Athletics U20 Championships and won the 2022 Ethiopian Athletics Championships in the 3000m steeplechase.

== Biography ==
In 2021 Samuel Firewu finished fourth in the Men's 3000 metres steeplechase at the 2021 World Athletics U20 Championships in Nairobi.

In March 2022 he became Ethiopia senior champion for the first time winning the 3000m steeplechase in Addis Ababa. He finished fifth at the 2022 African Championships in Athletics in June 2022 in Port Louis, Mauritius. In August 2022, he finished as runner-up to compatriot Samuel Duguna to win the silver medal in the 3000 metres steeplechase at the 2022 World Athletics U20 Championships in Cali, Colombia.

Samuel Firewu set a new personal best time of 8:10.57 at the Diamond League event in Monaco, in July 2023. He was selected for the Ethiopia team for the 2023 World Athletics Championships in Budapest. In September 2023, he finished second at the Diamond League event in Xiamen, China, in the 3000m steeplechase. Later that month, he finished second at the Diamond League final in Eugene, Oregon in a time of 8:10.74.

In March 2024, he won gold in the 3000 metres steeplechase at the African Games. In May 2024, he won the 3000 metres steeplechase at the 2024 Doha Diamond League event with a new personal best time of 8:07.25. He finished fourth in the 3000m steeplechase on 19 May 2024 at the 2024 Meeting International Mohammed VI d'Athlétisme, and second at the 2024 BAUHAUS-galan Diamond League event in Stockholm. He competed at the 2024 Summer Olympics in Paris in the 3000 metres steeplechase, finishing in sixth place in the final.

In January 2025, he finished third at the Cross Internacional Juan Muguerza in Elgoibar. He set a meeting record time of 8:05.61 to win the 3000 metres steeplechase at the 2025 Xiamen Diamond League event in China, in April 2025. The following week, he finished sixth at the 2025 Shanghai Diamond League event in China on 3 May 2025. He finished fourth at the 2025 Meeting International Mohammed VI d'Athlétisme de Rabat, part of the 2025 Diamond League, in May 2025 in the 3000 metres steeplechase and sixth in Monaco at the 2025 Herculis. He finished fourth in the World Championship final on 15 September 2025 in Tokyo, Japan.

In May 2026, he won the bronze medal in the 3000 metres steeplechase at the 2026 African Championships in Accra, Ghana, finishing behind compatriot Gemechu Godana and Morocco's Salaheddine Ben Yazide. On 19 June, Firewu was second in 8:10.44 at the 2026 Doha Diamond League. He placed fourth in the 3000 m steeplechase on 28 June at the 2026 Meeting de Paris. At the 2026 Diamond League Final in Brussels in September, he placed seventh in the 3000 metres steeplechase.
