= Edmund Serem =

Kenyan steeplechase runner

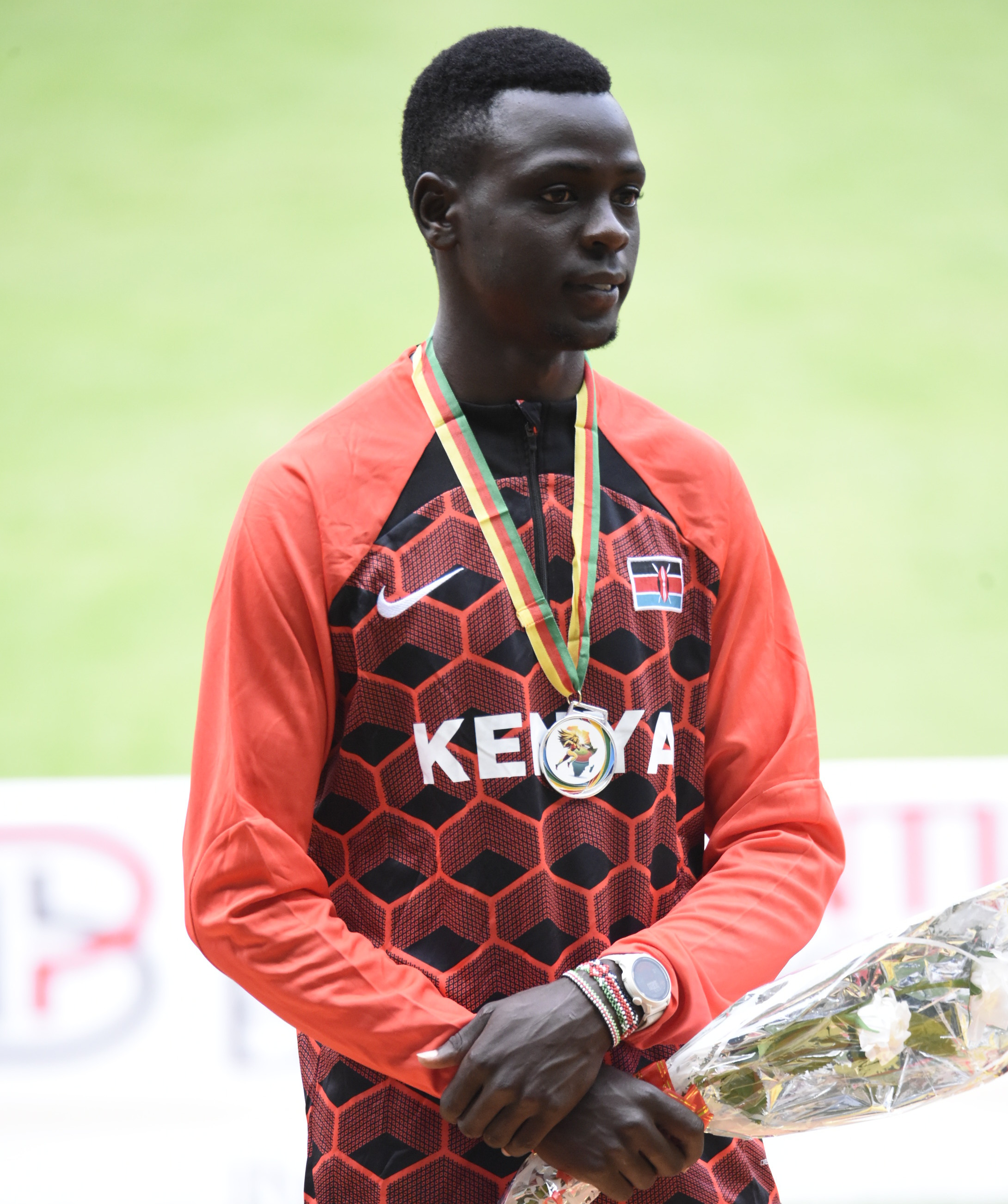
- Serem in 2024

Personal information
- National team: Kenyan
- Born: 27 December 2007 (age 18)

Sport
- Country: Kenya
- Sport: Athletics
- Event: 3000 metres steeplechase

Achievements and titles
- Personal bests: 3000 m Steeplechase: 8:01.61 (Rabat, 2026)
Medal record
Men's athletics
Representing Kenya
World Championships
Bronze medal – third place	2025 Tokyo	3000 m steeplechase
African Championships
Silver medal – second place	2024 Douala	3000 m steeplechase
Commonwealth Games
Gold medal – first place	2026 Glasgow	3000 m steeplechase
World U20 Championships
Gold medal – first place	2024 Lima	3000 m steeplechase

Edmund Serem (born 27 December 2007) is a Kenyan long-distance runner and steeplechaser. He won the gold medal at the 2026 Commonwealth Games and the bronze medal at the 2025 World Championships in the 3000 metres steeplechase.

== Biography ==
Serem won the gold medal in the 2000 metres steeplechase at the 2023 African U18 Championships in Ndola, Zambia in April 2023. He finished sixth at the 2023 African Games in the 3000 metres steeplechase in Accra, Ghana.

Serem won the silver medal in the 3000 metres steeplechase at the 2024 African Championships in Athletics in Douala, Cameroon. He won the gold medal at the 2024 World Athletics U20 Championships in Lima, Peru in the 3000 metres steeplechase in August 2024 in a time of 8:15.28.

Serem competed in the 3000 metres steeplechase at the 2025 Xiamen Diamond League event in China, in April 2025 running a personal best time of 8:08.50. The following weekend, he secured second place in the 3000m steeplechase at the 2025 Shanghai Diamond League, running a time of 8:08.68. On 24 May 2025, he ran a new personal best of 8:07.47 to finish third in the 3000 metres steeplechase at the 2025 Meeting International Mohammed VI d'Athlétisme de Rabat, also part of the 2025 Diamond League. He followed that with a steeplechase win at the Kip Keino Classic in Nairobi on 31 May 2025. He set a new personal best of 8:04.00 to place third at the 2025 Herculis event in Monaco. He placed second in the 3000 metres steeplechase at the 2025 Diamond League Final in 8:09.96.

Serem won the Kenyan Trials in July 2025, and was named in the Kenyan team for the 3000 metres steeplechase at the 2025 World Athletics Championships. In Tokyo, he won the bronze medal in the World Championship final on 15 September 2025. He subsequently won the World Athletics Rising Star of the Year Award.

On 31 May, he set a new personal best 8:01.61 to place fourth in the 3000 metres steeplechase in the 2026 Diamond League in Rabat, before placing second at the 2026 Bauhausgalan in Stockholm on 7 June. The following month, he was runner-up at the Kenyan Championships behind Simon Koech. He placed third in the 3000 metres steeplechase on 28 June at the 2026 Meeting de Paris and was third again on 10 July at the 2026 Herculis event in Monaco. On 27 July, he won the gold medal in the 3000 m steeplechase at the 2026 Commonwealth Games ahead of Koech in a Kenyan sweep of the podium places. At the 2026 Diamond League Final in Brussels on 5 September, he placed sixth in 8:15.26.

== Personal life ==
His older brother Amos Serem is also a steeplechaser and a former world U20 champion in the steeplechase.
