= Clement Kemboi =

Kenyan steeplechase runner (1992–2024)

Personal information
- Nationality: Kenyan
- Born: Clement Kimutai Kemboi; 10 February 1992
- Died: 7 October 2024 (aged 32) Iten, Kenya
- Height: 180 cm (5 ft 11 in)
- Weight: 65 kg (143 lb)

Sport
- Sport: Athletics
- Event: 3000 metres steeplechase

Achievements and titles
- Personal best: 3000m SC: 8:10.65 (2016)
Medal record
Men's athletics
Representing Kenya
African Games
Gold medal – first place	2015 Brazzaville	3000 m steeplechase

Clement Kimutai Kemboi (10 February 1992 – 7 October 2024) was a Kenyan middle-distance runner specializing in the 3000 metres steeplechase. He was the 2015 African Games champion in that event.

== Biography ==
Clement Kemboi was born on 10 February 1992. His first international circuit win was at the 2011 Weltklasse in Biberach, where he ran a personal best (PB) of 8:34.22 in the 3000 m steeplechase. He went on to record top-three finishes at several minor meetings over the next few years, including being a pacemaker for steeplechase and 5000 m races.

In 2015, Kemboi achieved his first international medal with a win at the African games men's steeplechase, which earned him comparisons to compatriot and Olympic gold medalist Ezekiel Kemboi. He was ranked 8th globally in the men's steeplechase that year by Track & Field News.

Kemboi achieved his PB of 8:10.65 at the 2016 Doha Diamond League, placing 6th and scoring 1 point in the 2016 Diamond League season.

Kemboi committed suicide in Iten, Kenya, on 7 October 2024, at the age of 32.

== Statistics ==
=== Personal bests ===
Event	Mark	Competition	Venue	Date
3000 metres steeplechase	8:10.65	Doha Diamond League	Doha, Qatar	6 May 2016
3000 metres	7:51.65	Folksam Grand Prix	Gothenburg, Sweden	15 July 2016
