= Geoffrey Kirwa =

Kenyan athlete (born 2001)

Personal information
- Born: Geoffrey Kipkemoi Kirwa; 3 July 2001 (age 25)

Sport
- Sport: Track and Field
- Event: Steeplechase

Achievements and titles
- Personal best: 3000m steeplechase: 8:08.10 (2026)
Medal record
Men's Athletics
Representing Kenya
African Championships
Bronze medal – third place	2022 Port Louis	3000 m steeplechase

Geoffrey Kipkemoi Kirwa (born 3 July 2001) is a Kenyan steeplechaser. He won the bronze medal at the 2022 African Championships in the 3000 metres steeplechase, and won the title at that distance at the 2026 NCAA Championships in the United States.

== Biography ==
Kirwa won the bronze medal in the 3000 metres steeplechase at the 2022 African Championships in Mauritius, running 8:29.74.

Kirwa finished 11th in the 2024 Kenyan Olympic Trials in the 3000 m steeplechase. The following year, he competed as a freshman for the University of Louisville in the United States, and made an immediate impact at the Bryan Clay Invitational in Azusa, California in April 2025 when he ran a new personal best by more than eight seconds with 8:13.89 for the 3000 m steeplechase, the fastest time run by a college athlete in the month of April. Competing at the 2025 NCAA Outdoor Championships, he placed second to James Corrigan in the 3000m steeplechase final in 8:17.12 at Hayward Field in Eugene, Oregon.

In May 2026, Kirwa moved to second on the NCAA all-time for the 3000m steeplechase at the Bryan Clay Invitational, with a time of 8:08.10, behind only the time set by Henry Rono in 1978. On 12 June 2026, he won the 3000 metres steeplechase at the 2026 NCAA Outdoor Championships in 8:17.46.
