= Salaheddine Ben Yazide =

Moroccan steeplechase runner (born 2003)

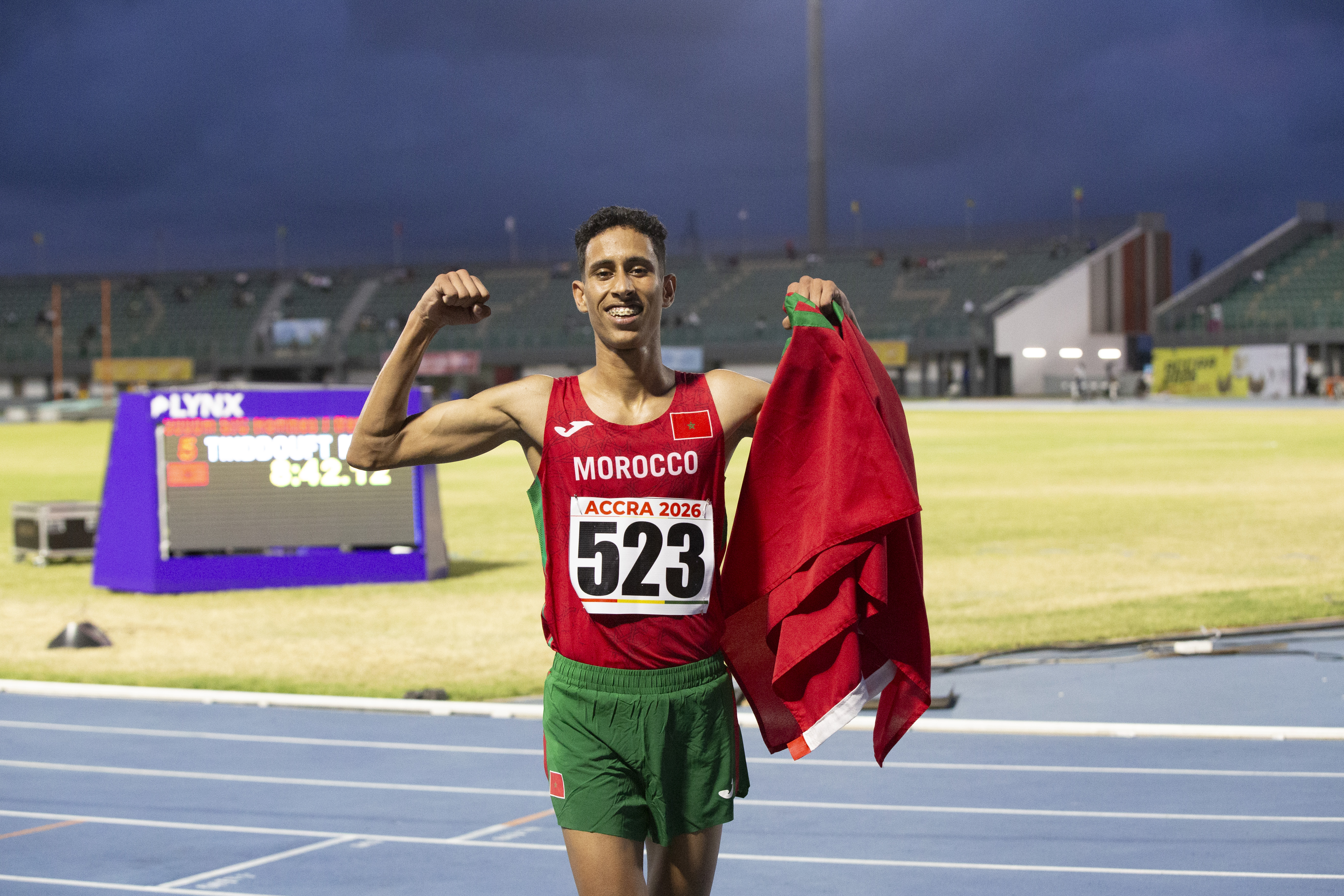
- At the 2026 African Championships

Personal information
- Born: 6 May 2003 (age 23)

Sport
- Sport: Athletics
- Event: 3000 m steeplechase

Achievements and titles
- Personal best: 3000m s'chase: 8:05.08 (2026)
Medal record
Men's athletics
Representing Morocco
Mediterranean Games
Gold medal – first place	2026 Taranto	3000 m st.
African Championships
Silver medal – second place	2026 Accra	3000 m s'chase
Islamic Solidarity Games
Gold medal – first place	2025 Riyadh	3000 m st.
Arab Championships
Bronze medal – third place	2023 Algiers	3000 m st.
Arab U23 Championships
Gold medal – first place	2024 Ismailia	3000 m st.
World U20 Championships
Bronze medal – third place	2022 Cali	3000 m st.

Salaheddine Ben Yazide (born 6 May 2003) is a Moroccan steeplechaser.

== Biography ==
He was a bronze medalist at the 2022 World Athletics U20 Championships in Cali, Colombia, behind European runners Samuel Duguna and Samuel Firewu.

He won the Moroccan national title in July 2023 at the Moroccan Athletics Championships in Rabat. He was a silver medalist in the 3000 metres steeplechase at the 2023 Arab Athletics Championships. He competed for Morocco at the 2023 World Athletics Championships in Budapest.

He competed at the 2025 Diamond League event at the 2025 Meeting International Mohammed VI d'Athlétisme de Rabat in Rabat in May 2025, placing eighth by running 8:11.40. He finished second in the 3000m steeplechase in June 2025 at the 2025 Meeting de Paris. He set a new personal best to finish fourth in the 3000 metres steeplechase in the Diamond League in Monaco on 11 July 2025 in 8:06.44. He placed third in the 3000 metres steeplechase at the 2025 Diamond League Final in Zurich in 8:14.10. He finished fifth in the World Championship final on 15 September 2025.

In May 2026, he won the silver medal in the 3000 metres steeplechase at the 2026 African Championships in Accra, Ghana, finishing between Ethiopians Gemechu Godana and Samuel Firewu. Later that month, he places sixth in the 3000 metres steeplechase at the 2026 Meeting International Mohammed VI d'Athlétisme de Rabat, part of the 2026 Diamond League. On 7 June, he placed fourth at the Diamond League event in Stockholm. On 16 June, he won the 3000m steeplechase in 8:09.88 at the Golden Spike Ostrava. On 23 August, he ran a personal best 8:05.08 to place third in the Diamond League at the 2026 Kamila Skolimowska Memorial in Silesia, Poland.
