= Matthew Kosgei =

Kenyan steeplechase runner

Personal information
- National team: Kenyan
- Born: 14 March 2006 (age 20)

Sport
- Country: Kenya
- Sport: Athletics
- Event: 3000 metres steeplechase

Achievements and titles
- Personal best: 3000 m Steeplechase: 8:17.46 (2024)
Medal record
Men's athletics
Representing Kenya
African Championships
Bronze medal – third place	2024 Douala	3000 m s'chase
World U20 Championships
Silver medal – second place	2024 Lima	3000 m steeplechase

Matthew Kosgei (born 14 March 2006) is a Kenyan long-distance runner and steeplechaser.

== Career ==
He finished third in the 3000 metres steeplechase at the 2024 Kip Keino Classic in a personal best time of 8:23.84.

He won the bronze medal in the 3000 metres steeplechase at the 2024 African Championships in Athletics in Douala, Cameroon.

He won the silver medal at the 2024 World Athletics U20 Championships in Lima, Peru in the 3000 metres steeplechase in August 2024 in a personal best time of 8:17.46. He had previously won his semi final in a time of 8:24.64.

Kosgei was an All-American runner for the New Mexico Lobos track and field team, finishing 6th in the 3000 m steeplechase at the 2025 NCAA Division I Outdoor Track and Field Championships.

== Personal life ==
His father William also competed in the steeplechase for Kenya.
