= Kenneth Rooks =

American athlete (born 1999)

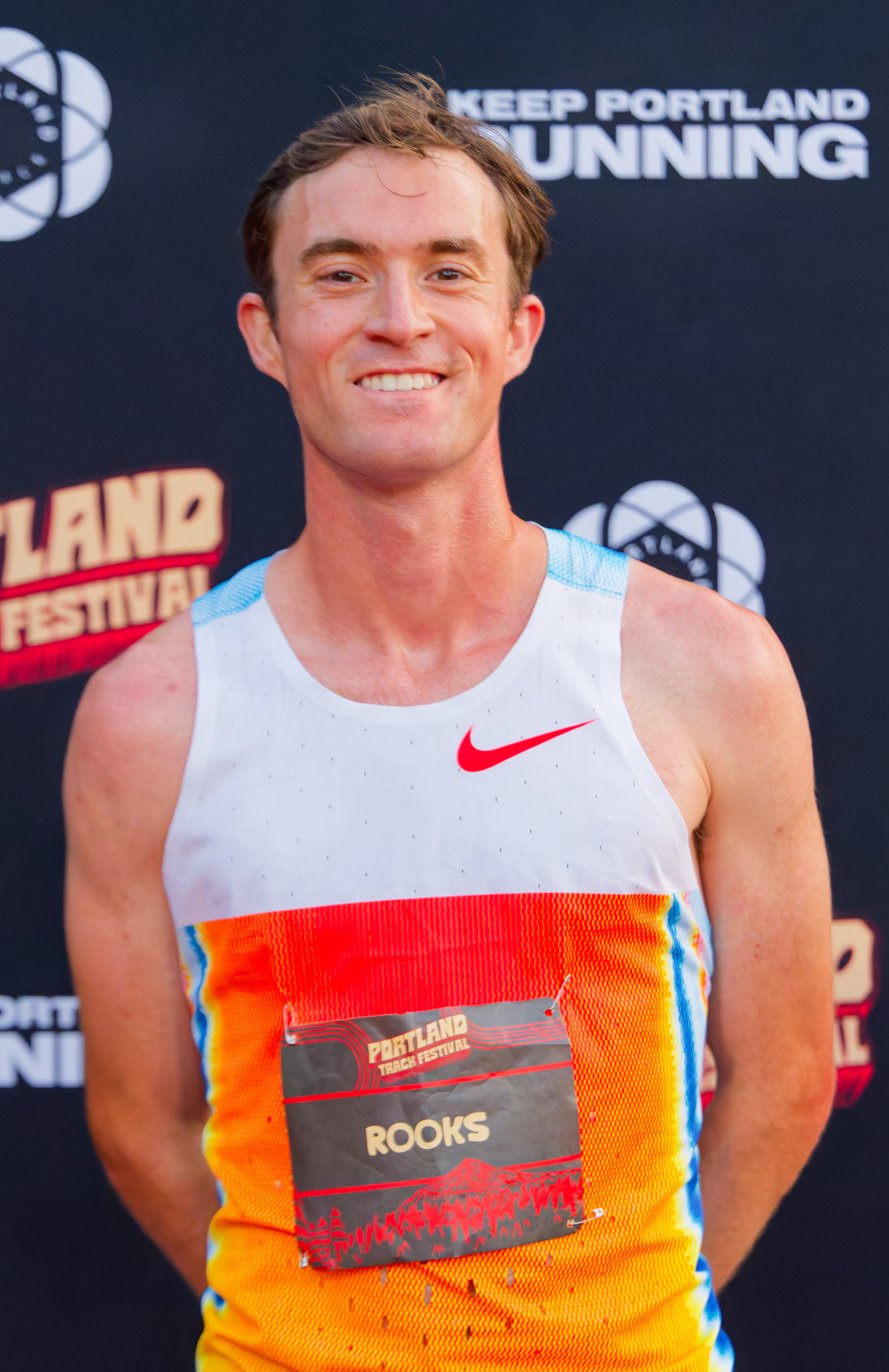
- Rooks in 2025

Personal information
- Nationality: American
- Born: October 21, 1999 (age 26)
- Height: 5 ft 10 in (178 cm)

Sport
- Sport: Athletics
- Event: 3000 m steeplechase
- College team: BYU Cougars
- Club: Nike, Run Elite
- Turned pro: January 2024

Achievements and titles
- Personal bests: 3000 m steeplechase: 8:06.41 (Paris Olympics, 2024)
Medal record
Men's athletics
Representing the United States
Olympic Games
Silver medal – second place	2024 Paris	3000 m steeplechase
NACAC Championships
Bronze medal – third place	2025 Freeport	3000 m steeplechase

Kenneth Rooks (/rʊks/ RUUKS; born October 21, 1999) is an American track and field athlete who specializes in the 3000 m steeplechase. Originally from College Place, Washington, Rooks competed in college for the BYU Cougars, where he was the national champion in the steeplechase at the 2023 NCAA Division I Outdoor Track and Field Championships. Rooks signed a professional contract with Nike in 2024. He won a silver medal at the 2024 Summer Olympics in the 3000 m steeplechase.

== Early life ==
Rooks attended College Place High School in College Place, Washington. He won multiple state titles in cross country and track, and he recorded personal bests of 1:53.56 for 800 m, 4:11.40 for one mile, and 9:20.86 for 3200 m. During his first two years of college at Brigham Young University, Rooks did not participate in athletics due to his time spent in Kampala, Uganda as a missionary for The Church of Jesus Christ of Latter-day Saints.

== College career ==
On May 6, 2023, Rooks recorded a new personal best in the 3000 m steeplechase, running 8:17.62 in Walnut, California; at the time, it was the fastest-ever time by an American collegiate athlete. It also broke a 46-year-old school record set by Henry Marsh. In June 2023, Rooks won the 2023 NCAA Division I Outdoor Track and Field Championships title in the 3000 m steeplechase, at the event held in Austin, Texas. His winning time of 8:26.17 was a new stadium record.

== Senior career ==
=== 2023 ===
Competing at the 2023 USA Outdoor Track and Field Championships, in Eugene, Oregon, Rooks finished first in the final of the 3000 m steeplechase. The victory came despite Rooks falling during the race and having to work himself back to the front. Rooks said he mentally prepared for how he would react if he fell during a race and took inspiration from former national champion Henry Marsh, who would often race from the back of the field. Rooks was selected for the 2023 World Athletics Championships in Budapest in August 2023, in which he finished tenth in the final.

=== 2024: Olympic silver medalist ===
Rooks announced his decision to compete professionally for Nike in January 2024. At the 2024 U.S. Olympic Trials in June, Rooks made it through the heats and won the 3000 m steeplechase final in a time of 8:21.92, securing his spot on Team USA for the 2024 Paris Olympics.

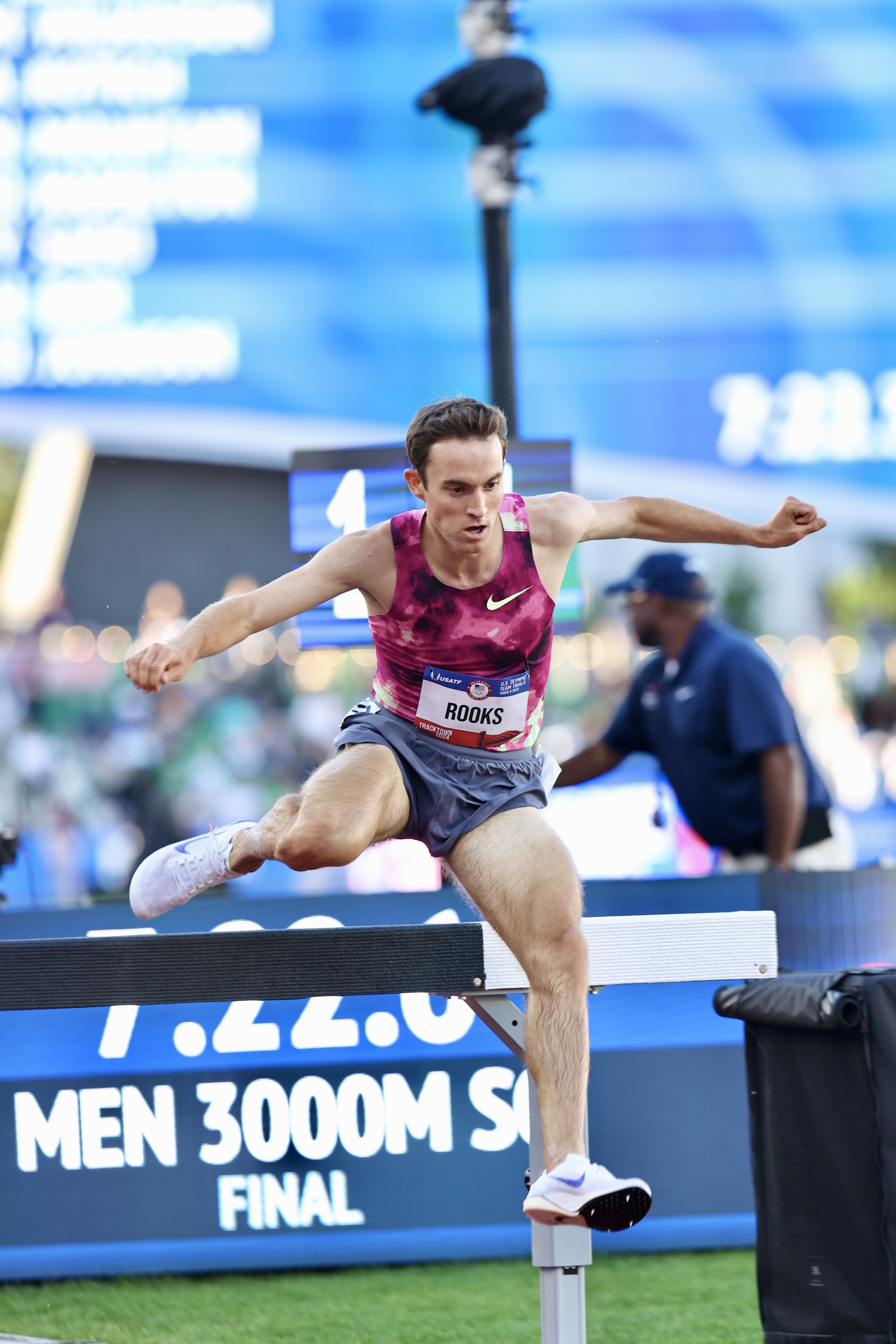
Rooks competing in the 3000 m steeplechase at the 2024 Olympic Trials

At the Olympic Games, Rooks' first, he made it into the final of the 3000 m steeplechase and won the silver medal in a new personal best time of 8:06.41. Rooks stayed back for much of the race, but after gradually moving up on the pack, he surged to the lead in the bell lap. During the final jump on the back straightaway, world record holder Lamecha Girma fell, causing several other athletes to stumble. In the final curve, after the last water jump, Rooks was passed by defending Olympic champion Soufiane El Bakkali of Morocco, while Kenyan Abraham Kibiwot caught up to Rooks at the final jump. However, Rooks kicked, and he edged Kibiwot at the finish line to earn the silver medal while improving his personal best by nine seconds.

=== 2025 ===
He won his third consecutive national title at the 2025 USA Outdoor Track and Field Championships in Eugene with a time of 8:26.58. He won the bronze medal in the 3000m steeplechase at the 2025 NACAC Championships in Freeport, Bahamas, finishing behind his compatriot Daniel Michalski and Aaron Ahl of Canada. In September 2025, he competed in the 3000 metres steeplechase at the 2025 World Championships in Tokyo, Japan.

== Personal life ==
As of 2024, he lives in the Provo, Utah area with his wife, Taylor.
