= 2021 World Athletics U20 Championships – Men's 3000 metres steeplechase =

Men's 3000 metres steeplechase at the 2021 World Athletics U20 Championships
- Venue: Kasarani Stadium
- Dates: 22 August
- Competitors: 15 from 10 nations
- Winning time: 8:30.72

Medalists
gold medal	Amos Serem	Kenya
silver medal	Bikila Tadese Takele	Ethiopia
bronze medal	Simon Kiprop Koech	Kenya

The men's 3000 metres steeplechase at the 2021 World Athletics U20 Championships in Kenya was held at the Kasarani Stadium on 22 August.

== Records ==
Standing records prior to the 2021 World Athletics U20 Championships
World U20 Record	Saif Saaeed Shaheen (KEN)	7:58.66	Brussels, Belgium	24 August 2001
Championship Record	Conseslus Kipruto (KEN)	8:06.10	Barcelona, Spain	15 July 2012
World U20 Leading	Bikila Tadese Takele (ETH)	8:09.37	Hengelo, Netherlands	8 June 2021

== Results ==
The final was held on 22 August at 16:05.

Rank	Name	Nationality	Time	Note
1st place, gold medalist(s)	Amos Serem	Kenya	8:30.72	
2nd place, silver medalist(s)	Bikila Tadese Takele	Ethiopia	8:33.15	
3rd place, bronze medalist(s)	Simon Kiprop Koech	Kenya	8:34.79	
4	Samuel Firewu	Ethiopia	8:46.16	
5	Abel Yemane	Eritrea	8:49.96	PB
6	Elphas Toroitich Ndiwa	Uganda	8:58.09	
7	Leonard Chemutai	Uganda	9:03.14	
8	Simon Mebrahtu	Eritrea	9:07.13	
9	Marc Fernández	Spain	9:09.61	
10	Tomáš Habarta	Czech Republic	9:09.86	
11	Baptiste Cartieaux	France	9:10.01	
12	Dylan Uhrich	Canada	9:11.33	
13	Mourad Ed-Dafali	Morocco	9:15.73	
14	Abderrahmane Daoud	Algeria	9:18.96	
15	Eliot Bidet	France	9:22.05	
