= 2022 World Athletics U20 Championships – Men's 3000 metres steeplechase =

Men's 3000 metres steeplechase at the 2022 World Athletics U20 Championships
- Venue: Estadio Olímpico Pascual Guerrero
- Dates: 1 August (heats); 4 August (final)
- Competitors: 38 from 26 nations
- Winning time: 8:37.92

Medalists
gold medal	Samuel Duguna	Ethiopia
silver medal	Samuel Firewu	Ethiopia
bronze medal	Salaheddine Ben Yazide	Morocco

The men's 3000 metres steeplechase at the 2022 World Athletics U20 Championships was held at the Estadio Olímpico Pascual Guerrero in Cali, Colombia on 1 and 4 August 2022.

38 athletes from 26 countries were originally entered to the competition, even though the first published entry list featured 43 athletes from 27 countries.

== Records ==
U20 standing records prior to the 2022 World Athletics U20 Championships were as follows:

Record	Athlete & Nationality	Mark	Location	Date
World U20 Record	Saif Saaeed Shaheen (KEN)	7:58.66	Brussels, Belgium	24 August 2001
Championship Record	Conseslus Kipruto (KEN)	8:06.10	Barcelona, Spain	15 July 2012
World U20 Leading	Salaheddine Ben Yazide (MAR)	8:19.63	Rabat, Morocco	5 June 2022

== Results ==
=== Round 1 ===
Round 1 took place on 3 August, with the 38 athletes involved being split into 3 heats. The first 3 athletes in each heat ( Q ) and the next 6 fastest ( q ) qualified to the final. The overall results were as follows:

Rank	Heat	Name	Nationality	Time	Note
1	3	Samuel Duguna	Ethiopia	8:44.83	Q
2	3	Haron Kibet	Kenya	8:47.25	Q
3	3	Tomáš Habarta	Czech Republic	8:47.36	Q, NU20R
4	2	Samuel Firewu	Ethiopia	8:49.27	Q
5	2	Emmanuel Wafula	Kenya	8:49.57	Q
6	3	Elphas Toroitich Ndiwa	Uganda	8:50.05	q
7	1	Salaheddine Ben Yazide	Morocco	8:50.70	Q
8	3	Asahi Kuroda	Japan	8:51.04	q
9	1	Leonard Chemutai	Uganda	8:51.09	Q
10	1	Hamse Dhabar	Bahrain	8:51.25	Q, PB
11	1	Abderrahmane Daoud	Algeria	8:51.30	q
12	2	Ryotaro Onuma	Japan	9:00.02	Q
13	3	Rubén Leonardo	Spain	9:00.60	q
14	1	Baptiste Cartieaux	France	9:01.37	q
15	2	Cesare Caiani	Italy	9:02.35	q
16	2	Clément Labar	Belgium	9:04.39	
17	3	Paulo de Jesus Gomez	Costa Rica	9:05.97	NU20R
18	2	Thomas Bridger	Great Britain	9:06.37	
19	1	Peter Visser	United States	9:06.47	
20	3	Wilson Navarrete	Ecuador	9:06.99	
21	2	Bryce Lentz	United States	9:07.67	
22	3	Tomer Mualem	Israel	9:08.19	
23	2	César Morales	Mexico	9:11.70	
24	1	Archie Noakes	Australia	9:12.50	
25	2	Flynn Pumpa	Australia	9:14.48	
26	2	Maciej Megier	Poland	9:14.55	
27	2	Roger Suria	Spain	9:14.60	
28	1	Maximilian Matolín	Czech Republic	9:21.33	
29	1	Vinicius De Carvalho	Brazil	9:22.17	
30	2	Matthys Bourse	France	9:23.04	
31	3	Vebjørn Hovdejord	Norway	9:23.42	
32	1	Silas Zahlten	Germany	9:29.08	
33	3	Kurt Lauer	Germany	9:31.73	
34	1	Leandro Monteiro	Portugal	9:31.93	
35	1	Roberto Angel Marquez	Germany	9:33.02	
36	3	Moetez Fajraoui	Tunisia	9:44.89	
	2	Yassin Chninni	Tunisia		DNF
	1	Ferenc Soma Kovács	Hungary		DNS

=== Final ===
The final was started at 17:01 on 6 August. The results were as follows:

Rank	Name	Nationality	Time	Note
1st place, gold medalist(s)	Samuel Duguna	Ethiopia	8:37.92	
2nd place, silver medalist(s)	Samuel Firewu	Ethiopia	8:39.11	
3rd place, bronze medalist(s)	Salaheddine Ben Yazide	Morocco	8:40.62	
4	Leonard Chemutai	Uganda	8:41.03	
5	Hamse Dhabar	Bahrain	8:44.74	PB
6	Emmanuel Wafula	Kenya	8:45.05	
7	Elphas Toroitich Ndiwa	Uganda	8:49.27	
8	Abderrahmane Daoud	Algeria	8:49.86	
9	Tomáš Habarta	Czech Republic	8:51.86	
10	Haron Kibet	Kenya	8:53.79	
11	Rubén Leonardo	Spain	8:55.77	
12	Asahi Kuroda	Japan	8:56.36	
13	Baptiste Cartieaux	France	9:08.03	
14	Ryotaro Onuma	Japan	9:14.37	
15	Cesare Caiani	Italy	9:14.73	
