= Athletics at the 2015 African Games – Men's 3000 metres steeplechase =

The men's 3000 metres steeplechase event at the 2015 African Games was held on 13 September.

== Results ==
| Rank | Name | Nationality | Time | Notes |
|---|---|---|---|---|
| 1st place, gold medalist(s) | Clement Kemboi | Kenya | 8:20.31 | |
| 2nd place, silver medalist(s) | Hillary Kemboi | Kenya | 8:22.96 | SB |
| 3rd place, bronze medalist(s) | Hailemariyam Amare | Ethiopia | 8:24.19 | SB |
| 4 | Wogene Sebisibe | Ethiopia | 8:26.62 | SB |
| 5 | Chala Beyo | Ethiopia | 8:28.03 | |
| 6 | Yemane Haileselassie | Eritrea | 8:32.05 | |
| 7 | Yousif Abdalla Timbo | Sudan | 8:33.96 | NR |
| 8 | Abel Mutai | Kenya | 8:38.10 | |
| 9 | Hichem Bouchicha | Algeria | 8:38.92 | |
| 10 | Bilal Tabti | Algeria | 8:41.48 | |
| 11 | Abdel Moula Hossney | Sudan | 9:18.09 | |
| | Gaylord Silly | Seychelles | DNS | |
