= 2022 African Championships in Athletics – Men's 3000 metres steeplechase =

The men's 3000 metres steeplechase event at the 2022 African Championships in Athletics was held on 10 June in Port Louis, Mauritius.

== Results ==
Rank	Athlete	Nationality	Time	Notes
1st place, gold medalist(s)	Hailemariyam Amare	Ethiopia	8:27.38	
2nd place, silver medalist(s)	Tadese Takele	Ethiopia	8:28.31	
3rd place, bronze medalist(s)	Geoffrey Kirwa	Kenya	8:29.74	
4	Mohamed Tindouft	Morocco	8:29.91	
5	Samuel Firewu	Ethiopia	8:32.11	
6	Benjamin Kigen	Kenya	8:38.83	
7	Salem Salem	Egypt	8:42.21	
8	Ashley Smith	South Africa	8:46.59	
9	Ezekiel Mutai	Uganda	8:58.15	
	Mohamed Ismail	Djibouti	DNS	
	Conseslus Kipruto	Kenya	DNS	
