= Simon Koech =

Kenyan steeplechase runner

Personal information
- Full name: Simon Kiprop Koech
- National team: Kenyan
- Born: 6 October 2003 (age 23) Buret District, Kericho County, Kenya

Sport
- Country: Kenya
- Sport: Athletics
- Event: 3000 metres steeplechase

Achievements and titles
- Personal bests: 3000 m Steeplechase: 7:59.44 (Rabat, 2026)
Medal record
Men's athletics
Representing Kenya
Diamond League
First place	2023	3000 m st.
Third place	2026	3000 m st.
African Games
Bronze medal – third place	2023 Accra	3000 m st.
Commonwealth Games
Silver medal – second place	2026 Glasgow	3000 m st.
World U20 Championships
Bronze medal – third place	2021 Nairobi	3000 m st.

Simon Kiprop Koech (born 6 October 2003) is a Kenyan track and field athlete. In 2023, 2025, and 2026 he won Kenyan Athletics Championships in the 3000m Steeplechase.

== Biography ==
Koech won a bronze medal at the 2021 World Athletics U20 Championships in the 3000m Steeplechase behind compatriot Amos Serem who won gold. In May 2023, he surprised five-time champion Benjamin Kigen to win the Kenyan Defence Forces Championship in the 3000m Steeplechase.

In July 2023, Koech won the 3000m Steeplechase at the Kenyan national trials, running 8:22.55 aged just 20 years-old, to finish ahead of Abraham Kibiwott and Leonard Bett.

On 21 July 2023, he made his debut in the Diamond League event in Monaco. He won the 3000m Steeplechase in a time of 8:04.19, a new personal best time. The time also met the qualification standard for the 2023 World Championships in Budapest. He competed in the 3000 metres steeplechase at the 2023 World Athletics Championships in Budapest in August 2023 and qualified for the final, in which he finished seventh.

In March 2024, he won bronze in the 3000m steeplechase at the African Games. He competed at the 2024 Summer Olympics in Paris in the 3000 metres steeplechase, placing seventh in the final.

Koech finished third in the 3000 metres steeplechase at the 2025 Xiamen Diamond League event in China, in April 2025. He also finished third in the 3000m steeplechase at the 2025 Shanghai Diamond League event in China on 3 May 2025. He won the 3000m steeplechase title at the Kenyan Athletics Championships in June 2025. In September 2025, he competed in the 3000 metres steeplechase at the 2025 World Championships in Tokyo, Japan.

On 31 May 2026, he set a new personal best 7:59.44 to place third in the 3000 metres steeplechase in the 2026 Diamond League in Rabat. The following month, he won the 3000 m steeplechase title at the Kenyan Championships in 8:16.59. On 10 July, he won the 3000m steeplechase in 8:03.35 at the 2026 Herculis Diamond League event in Monaco. On 27 July, he won the silver medal at the 2026 Commonwealth Games in Glasgow, Scotland, as part of a Kenyan sweep of the podium places alongside fold-medal winner Edmund Serem and Leonard Bett. At the 2026 Diamond League Final in Brussels on 5 September, he placed third in 8:11.15.
