= Athletics at the 2023 African Games – Men's 3000 metres steeplechase =

Men's 3000 metres steeplechase at the 2023 African Games
- Venue: Legon Sports Stadium
- Location: Accra, Ghana
- Dates: 18 March
- Competitors: 10 from 5 nations
- Winning time: 8:24.30

Medalists
gold medal	Samuel Firewu	Ethiopia
silver medal	Amos Serem	Kenya
bronze medal	Simon Koech	Kenya

The men's 3000 metres steeplechase event at the 2023 African Games was held on 18 March 2024 in Accra, Ghana.

== Results ==
Rank	Name	Nationality	Time	Notes
1st place, gold medalist(s)	Samuel Firewu	Ethiopia	8:24.30	
2nd place, silver medalist(s)	Amos Serem	Kenya	8:25.77	
3rd place, bronze medalist(s)	Simon Koech	Kenya	8:26.19	
4	Abraham Seme	Ethiopia	8:27.30	
5	Milkesa Fikadu	Ethiopia	8:27.55	
6	Edmund Serem	Kenya	8:31.21	
7	Ebrahim Jridi	Tunisia	8:45.78	
8	Salaheddine Ben Yazide	Morocco	8:51.38	
9	Salim Mohammed Salim	Egypt	8:53.55	
	Mohamed Tindouft	Morocco	DNF	
