= Chala Beyo =

Ethiopian long-distance runner

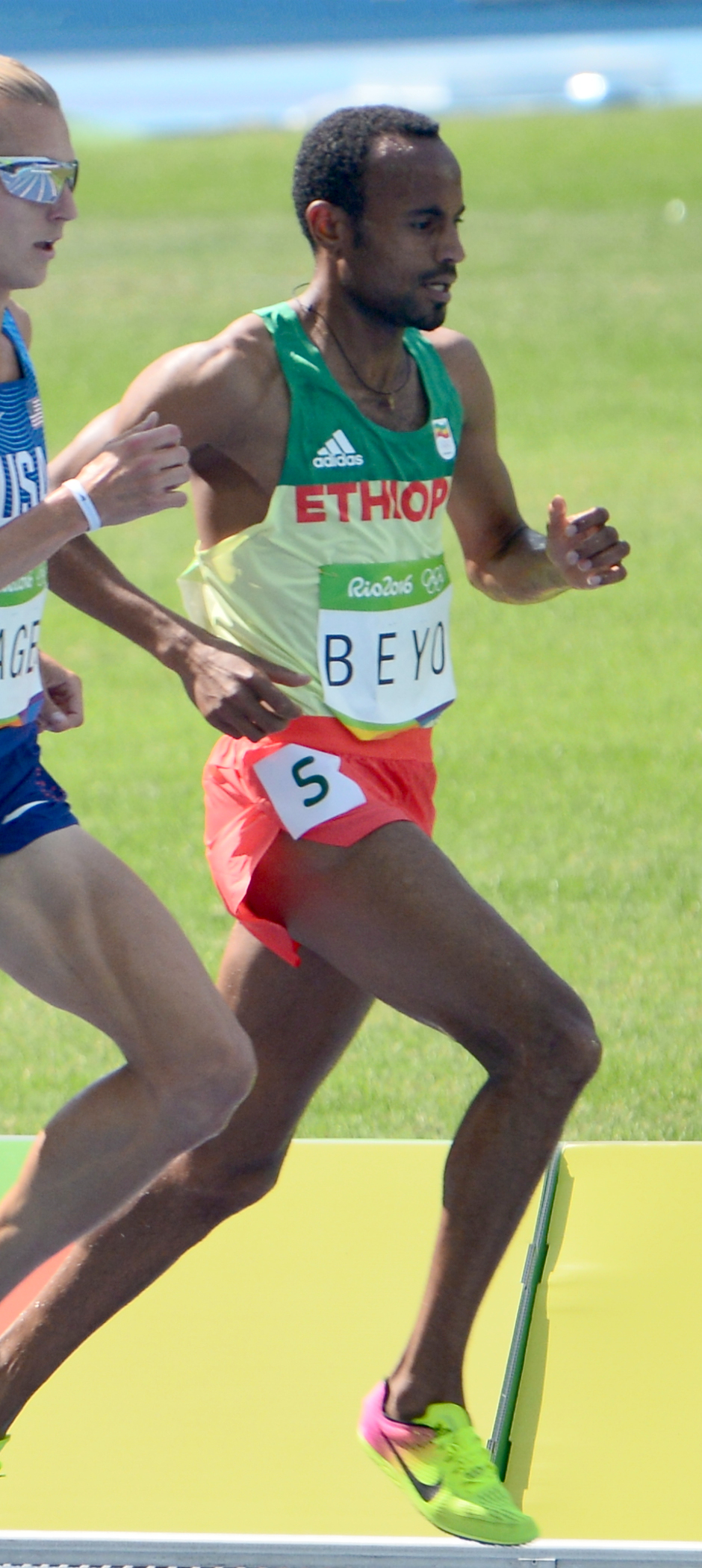
- Beyo at the 2016 Olympics

Personal information
- Born: 18 January 1996 (age 30)
- Height: 176 cm (5 ft 9 in)
- Weight: 58 kg (128 lb)

Sport
- Sport: Athletics
- Events: 3000 m, steeplechase

Achievements and titles
- Personal bests: 3000 m – 7:59.67 (2015); 3000 mS – 8:17.84 (2016)
Medal record
Men's athletics
Representing Ethiopia
African Championships
Gold medal – first place	2016 Durban	3000 m st.

Chala Beyo Techo (born 18 January 1996) is an Ethiopian long-distance runner who specialises in the 3000 metres steeplechase. He was the gold medallist in the steeplechase at the 2016 African Championships in Athletics, becoming the first non-Kenyan to win that title since Brahim Boulami in 2002.

He made his international the 2014 African Championships in Athletics, placing fourth behind a Kenyan trio. As a result, he was chosen to represent Africa at the 2014 IAAF Continental Cup, held later at the same venue, where he again finished in fourth place. He placed fifth at the 2015 African Games.

== International competitions ==
Year	Competition	Venue	Position	Event	Notes
2014	African Championships	Marrakesh, Morocco	4th	3000 m s'chase	8:40.02
2014	IAAF Continental Cup	Marrakesh, Morocco	4th	3000 m s'chase	8:25.45
2015	African Games	Brazzaville, Republic of the Congo	5th	3000 m s'chase	8:28.03
2016	African Championships	Durban, South Africa	1st	3000 m s'chase	8:21.02
2016	Olympic Games	Rio de Janeiro, Brazil	20th (h)	3000 m s'chase	8:32.06
2019	World Championships	Doha, Qatar	14th (h)	3000 m s'chase	8:21.09^{1}

^{1}Did not finish in the final
