= Hailemariyam Amare =

Ethiopian runner (born 1997)

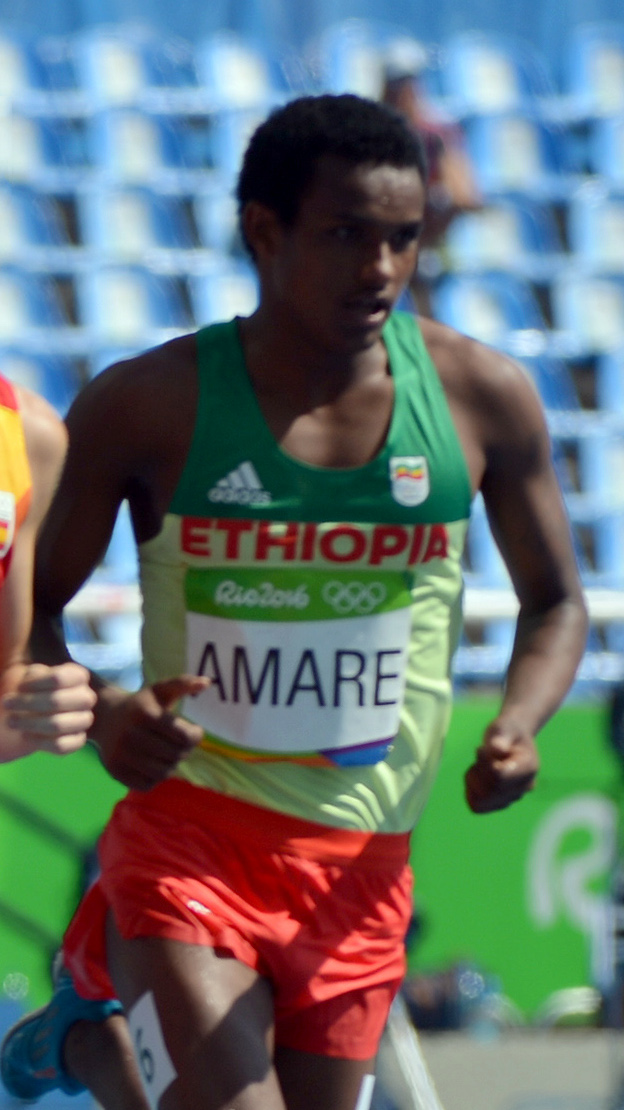
- Amare at the 2016 Olympics

Personal information
- Born: 22 February 1997 (age 29)

Sport
- Country: Ethiopia
- Sport: Track and field
- Event: 3000 m steeplechase

Achievements and titles
- Personal bests: 3000 m s'chase: 8:06.29 (2022); 5000 m: 13:12.72 (2022)
Medal record
Men's athletics
Representing Ethiopia
African Games
Bronze medal – third place	2015 Brazzaville	3000 m steeplechase
African Championships
Gold medal – first place	2022 Port Louis	3000 m steeplechase
Gold medal – first place	2022 Port Louis	5000 metres
World Cross Country Championships
Silver medal – second place	2023 Bathurst	Senior team

Hailemariyam Amare Tegegn (born 22 February 1997) is an Ethiopian runner specialising in the 3000 metres steeplechase. Hailemariyam placed 5th in the 2014 World Junior Championships. He represented his country at the 2015 World Championships in Beijing finishing twelfth in the final. He won a bronze medal at the 2015 African Games. He participated at the 2016 Summer Olympics but failed to reach the final. In 2022, he set a personal best time of 8:06.29 to finish 3rd at the Meeting International Mohammed VI d'Athletisme de Rabat. Later that year, he won the 3000 metres steeplechase and 5000 metres at the African Championships. He competed at the 2022 World Athletics Championships, reaching the 3000m steeplechase final and placing 10th. He was 8th at the 2022 Diamond League Final in Zurich.

== Competition record ==
Year	Competition	Venue	Position	Event	Notes
Representing Ethiopia
2014	World Junior Championships	Eugene, United States	5th	3000 m s'chase	8:42.00
2015	World Championships	Beijing, China	12th	3000 m s'chase	8:26.19
2015	African Games	Brazzaville, Republic of the Congo	3rd	3000 m s'chase	8:24.19
2016	Olympic Games	Rio de Janeiro, Brazil	28th (h)	3000 m s'chase	8:35.01
2018	African Championships	Asaba, Nigeria	6th	3000 m s'chase	8:38.46
2022	African Championships	Port Louis, Mauritius	1st	3000 m s'chase	8:27.38
2022	African Championships	Port Louis, Mauritius	1st	5000 m	13:36.79
2022	World Championships	Eugene, United States	10th	3000 m s'chase	8:31.54
2024	African Games	Accra, Ghana	7th	10,000 m	29:57.39
2024	African Championships	Douala, Cameroon	4th	3000 m s'chase	8:23.76
