= Mohamed Tindouft =

Moroccan steeplechase runner

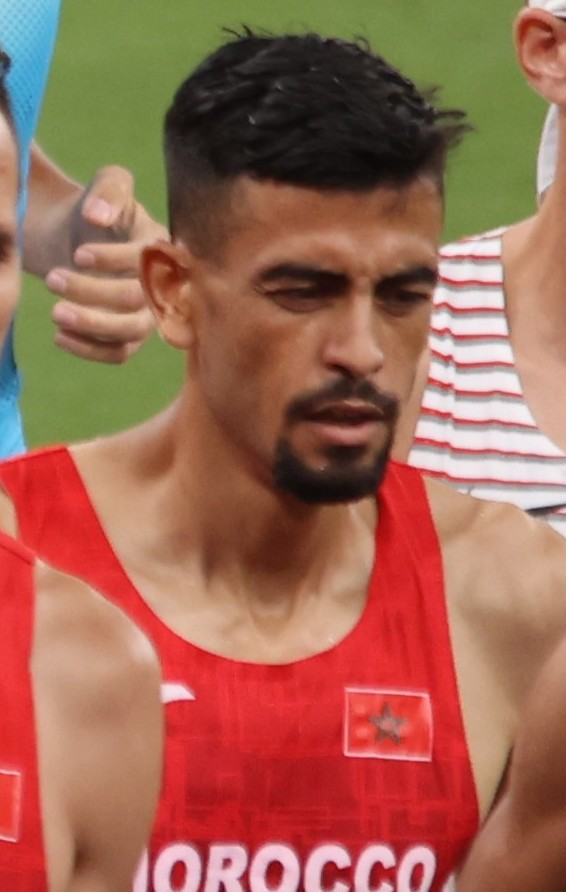
- Mohamed Tindouft at the 2020 Olympics

Personal information
- Born: 12 March 1993 (age 33) Azilal

Sport
- Sport: Athletics
- Event: 3000 m steeplechase
Medal record
Men's athletics
Representing Morocco
Mediterranean Games
Silver medal – second place	2026 Taranto	3000 m st.

Mohamed Tindouft (born 12 March 1993) is a Moroccan runner specialising in the 3000 metres steeplechase. He represented his country at the 2017 World Championships without reaching the final. He won gold medals at the 2017 Islamic Solidarity Games and 2017 Jeux de la Francophonie.

He competed in the men's 3,000 metres steeplechase at the 2020 Summer Olympics.

== International competitions ==
Year	Competition	Venue	Position	Event	Notes
Representing Morocco
2017	Islamic Solidarity Games	Baku, Azerbaijan	1st	3000 m s'chase	8:26.26
2017	Jeux de la Francophonie	Abidjan, Ivory Coast	1st	3000 m s'chase	8:44.69
2017	World Championships	London, United Kingdom	34th (h)	3000 m s'chase	8:40.99
2018	Mediterranean Games	Tarragona, Spain	–	3000 m s'chase	DNF
2018	African Championships	Asaba, Nigeria	8th	3000 m s'chase	8:44.12
2019	World Championships	Doha, Qatar	–	3000 m s'chase	DNF
2021	Arab Championships	Radès, Tunisia	1st	3000 m s'chase	8:31.50
2021	Olympic Games	Tokyo, Japan	13th	3000 m s'chase	8:23.56
2022	African Championships	Port Louis, Mauritius	4th	3000 m s'chase	8:29.91
2022	Mediterranean Games	Oran, Algeria	2nd	3000 m s'chase	8:23.85
2022	World Championships	Eugene, United States	–	3000 m s'chase	DNF
2022	Islamic Solidarity Games	Konya, Turkey	–	3000 m s'chase	DNF
2023	Jeux de la Francophonie	Kinshasa, DR Congo	2nd	3000 m s'chase	8:55.37
2023	World Championships	Budapest, Hungary	12th (h)	3000 m s'chase	8:20.67
2024	African Games	Accra, Ghana	–	3000 m s'chase	DNF
2024	Olympic Games	Paris, France	12th	3000 m s'chase	8:14.82
2025	World Championships	Tokyo, Japan	16th (h)	3000 m s'chase	8:35.73
2025	Islamic Solidarity Games	Riyadh, Saudi Arabia	–	3000 m s'chase	DNF
2026	African Championships	Accra, Ghana	5th	3000 m s'chase	8:42.12
2026	Mediterranean Games	Taranto, Italy	2nd	3000 m s'chase	8:46.58

== Personal bests ==
Outdoor

- 3000 metres – 7:38.92 (Chorzów 2021)
- 3000 metres steeplechase – 8:11.65 (Firenze 2021)
