= Tolosa Nurgi =

Ethiopian athlete

Personal information
- Born: 29 March 1990 (age 36)

Sport
- Country: Ethiopia
- Sport: Track and field
- Event: 3000 metres steeplechase
Medal record
Men's athletics
Representing Ethiopia
African Championships
Silver medal – second place	2016 Durban	3000 m st.

Tolosa Nurgi Gigsa (born 29 March 1990) is an Ethiopian athlete specialising in the 3000 metres steeplechase. He represented his country at the 2015 World Championships in Beijing finishing 15th in the final.

His personal best in the event is 8:21.33 set in Rome in 2016.

== Competition record ==
Year	Competition	Venue	Position	Event	Notes
Representing Ethiopia
2015	World Championships	Beijing, China	15th	3000 m s'chase	8:44.81
2016	African Championships	Durban, South Africa	2nd	3000 m s'chase	8:22.79
