= Leonard Chemutai =

Ugandan athlete

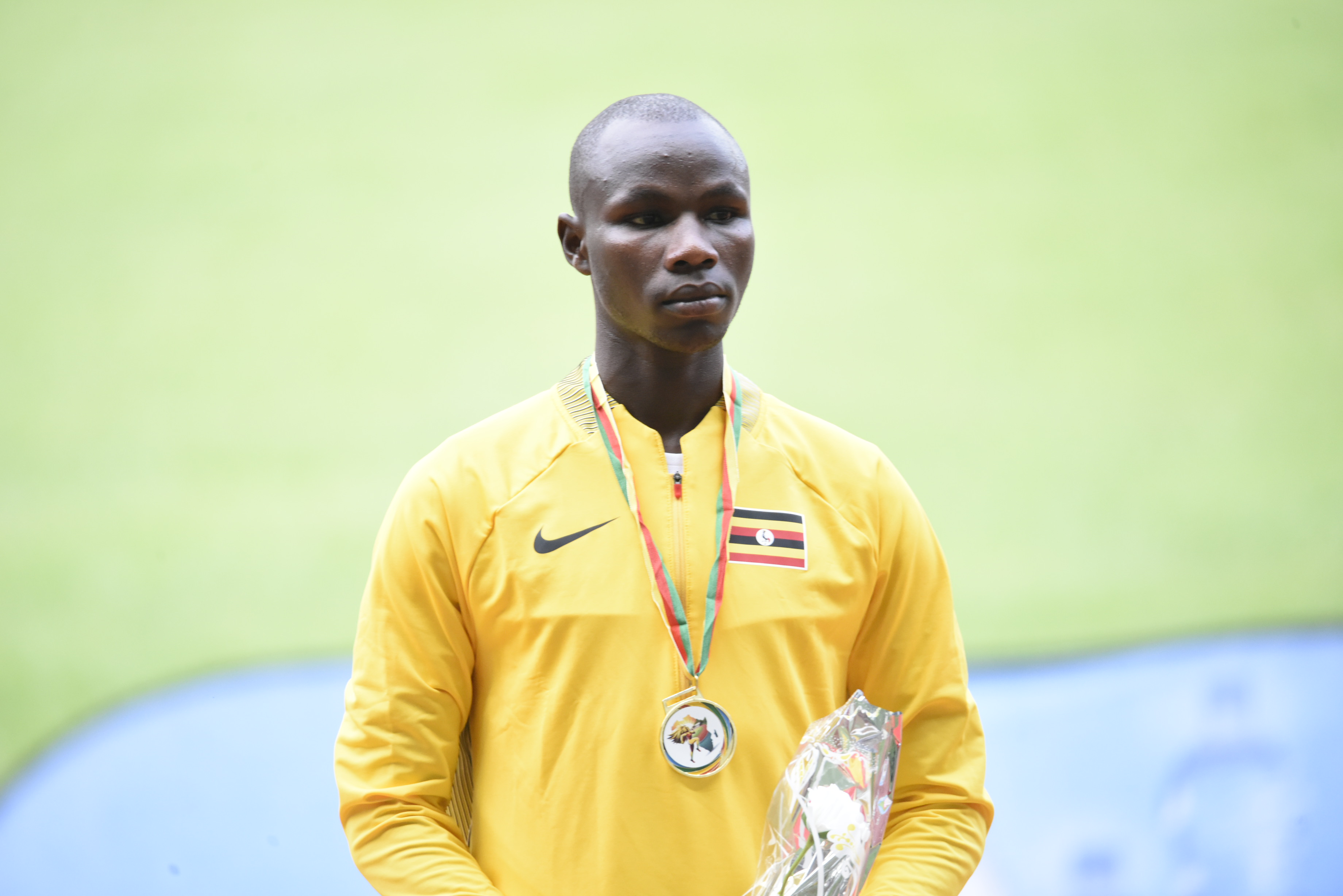

Personal information
- Nationality: Ugandan
- Born: 5 May 2003 (age 23)

Sport
- Sport: Athletics
- Event: 3000m steeplechase

Achievements and titles
- Personal bests: 5000m:14:02.26 (Kampala, 2021); 3000m steeplechase: 8:17.14 (Székesfehérvár, 2023)
Medal record
Men's athletics
Representing Uganda
African Championships
| Gold medal – first place | 2024 Douala | 3000 m s'chase |

Leonard Chemutai (born 5 May 2003) is a Ugandan track and field athlete.

== Career ==
Chemutai finished seventh in the Men's 3000 metres steeplechase at the 2021 World Athletics U20 Championships in Nairobi, Kenya.

In August 2022, he finished fourth in the 3000 metres steeplechase at the 2022 World Athletics U20 Championships in Cali, Colombia.

Chemutai won the U20 classic mountain race at the Trail World Championships in 2022. In 2023, he won the senior race at the championships.

Selected for the 2023 World Athletics Championships in Budapest, he qualified for the final of the 3000m steeplechase, in which he finished twelfth.

In June 2024, he won gold in the 3000 metres steeplechase at the African Championships in Douala, Cameroon. He competed at the 2024 Summer Olympics in Paris in the 3000 metres steeplechase, placing 15th in the final. In September 2025, he competed in the 3000 metres steeplechase at the 2025 World Championships in Tokyo, Japan.
