= Samuel Duguna =

Ethiopian athlete (born 2003)

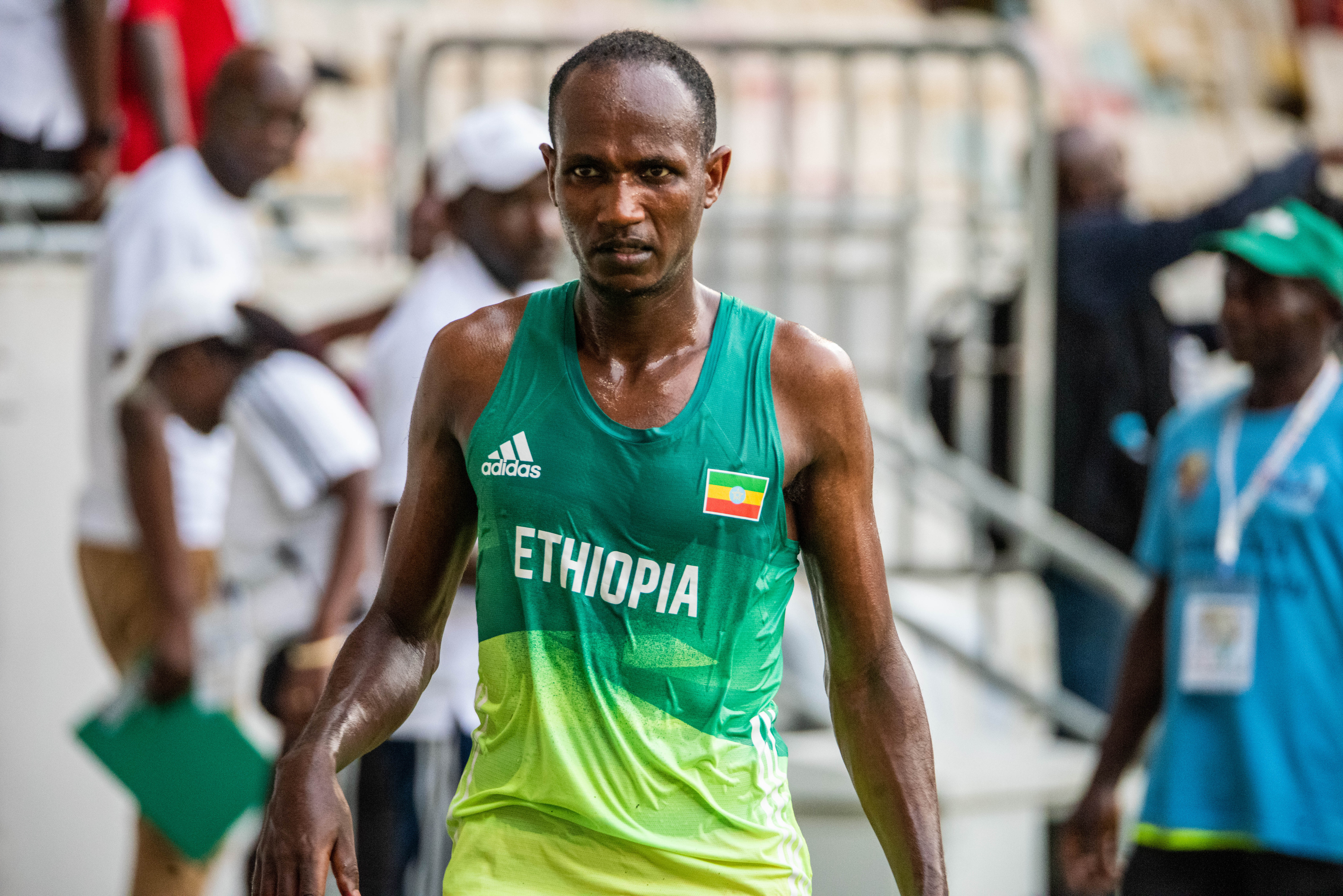

Personal information
- Nationality: Ethiopian
- Born: 20 September 2003 (age 22)

Sport
- Sport: Athletics
- Event: 3000m steeplechase

Achievements and titles
- Personal best(s): 3000m Steeplechase: 8:10.87 (Xiamen, 2025)
Medal record
Men's athletics
Representing Ethiopia
World U20 Championships
Gold medal – first place	2022 Cali	3000 m st.

Samuel Duguna (born 20 September 2003) is an Ethiopian steeplechaser. He won gold at the 2022 World Athletics U20 Championships in the 3000 metres steeplechase.

== Career ==
In March 2022, he finished fourth at the Ethiopian Athletics Championships in Hawassa in the 3000 metres steeplechase. He was runner-up in the 3000m steeplechase at the Kip Keino Classic in May 2022.

He won the 3000 metres steeplechase at the 2022 World Athletics U20 Championships in Cali, Colombia finishing in 8:37.92 ahead of compatriot Samuel Firewu in August 2022.

He made his Diamond League debut in Stockholm in July 2023.

In May 2024, he ran a 3000 metres steeplechase personal best time of 8:12.44 and met the Paris 2024 Olympic qualifying standard to win in Marseille.

He lowered his personal best to 8:10.87 for the 3000 metres steeplechase at the 2025 Xiamen Diamond League event in China, in April 2025.
