= Amos Serem =

Kenyan steeplechase runner

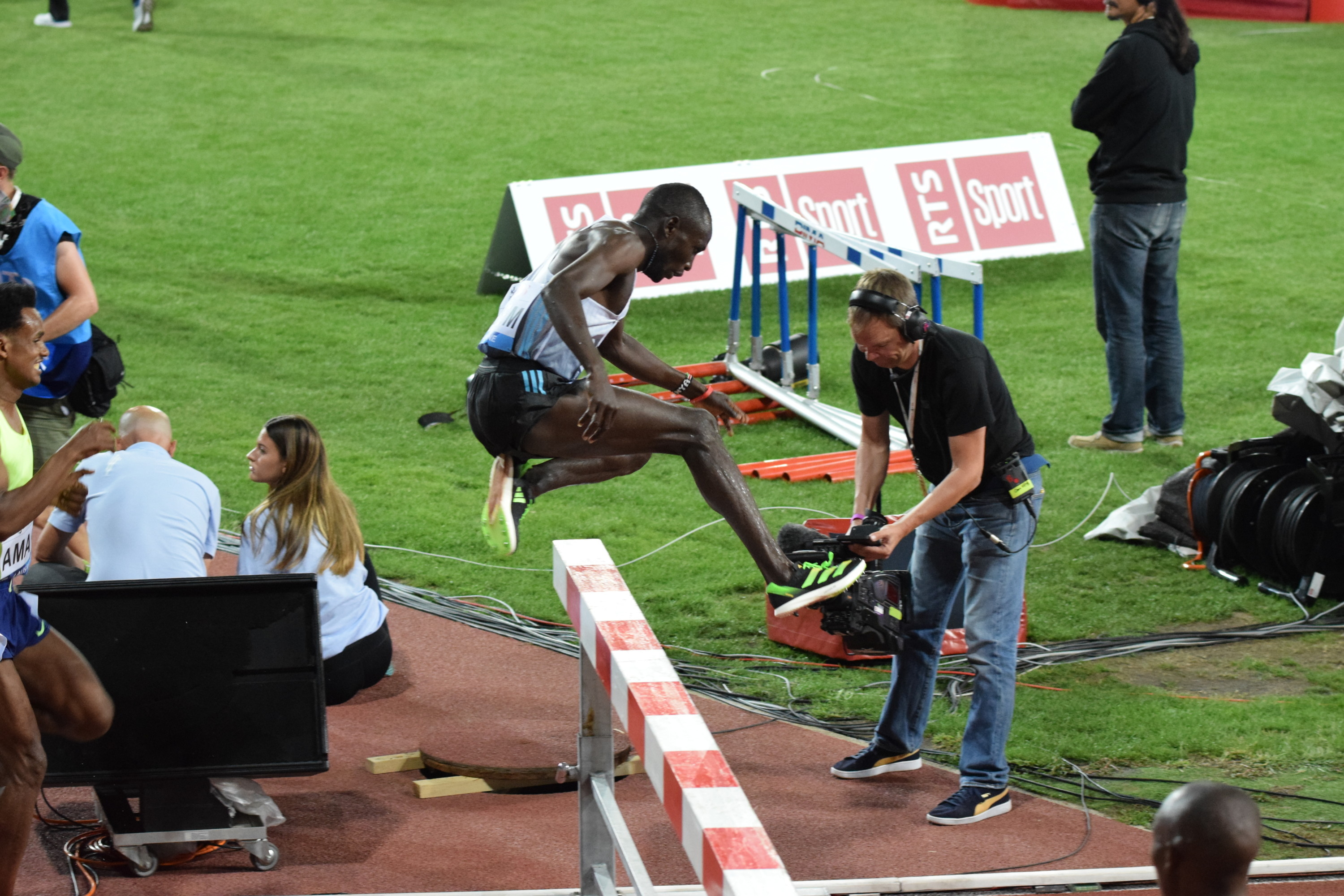
- Amos Serem competing in the 3000m steeplechase at Athletissima 2022

Personal information
- National team: Kenyan
- Born: 28 August 2002 (age 24) Muyeng'wet/Kabao Village, Uasin Gishu County, Kenya

Sport
- Country: Kenya
- Sport: Athletics
- Event: 3000 metres steeplechase

Achievements and titles
- Personal best: 3000 m Steeplechase: 8:02.36 (2024)
Medal record
Men's athletics
Representing Kenya
Diamond League
First place	2024 Brussels	3000 m st.
African Games
Silver medal – second place	2023 Accra	3000 m st.
World U20 Championships
Gold medal – first place	2021 Nairobi	3000 m st.

Amos Serem (born 28 August 2002) is a Kenyan athlete who specializes in the steeplechase running. He was the gold medallist at the World Athletics U20 Championships in 2021.

== Personal life ==
His younger brother Edmund Serem is also world U20 champion in the steeplechase.

== Personal bests ==
Event	Time	Date	Competition
3000 m Steeplechase	8:02.36	7 July 2024	2024 Meeting de Paris
