= 2023 Prefontaine Classic =

- Dates: 16-17 September 2023
- Host city: Eugene, Oregon, United States
- Venue: Hayward Field
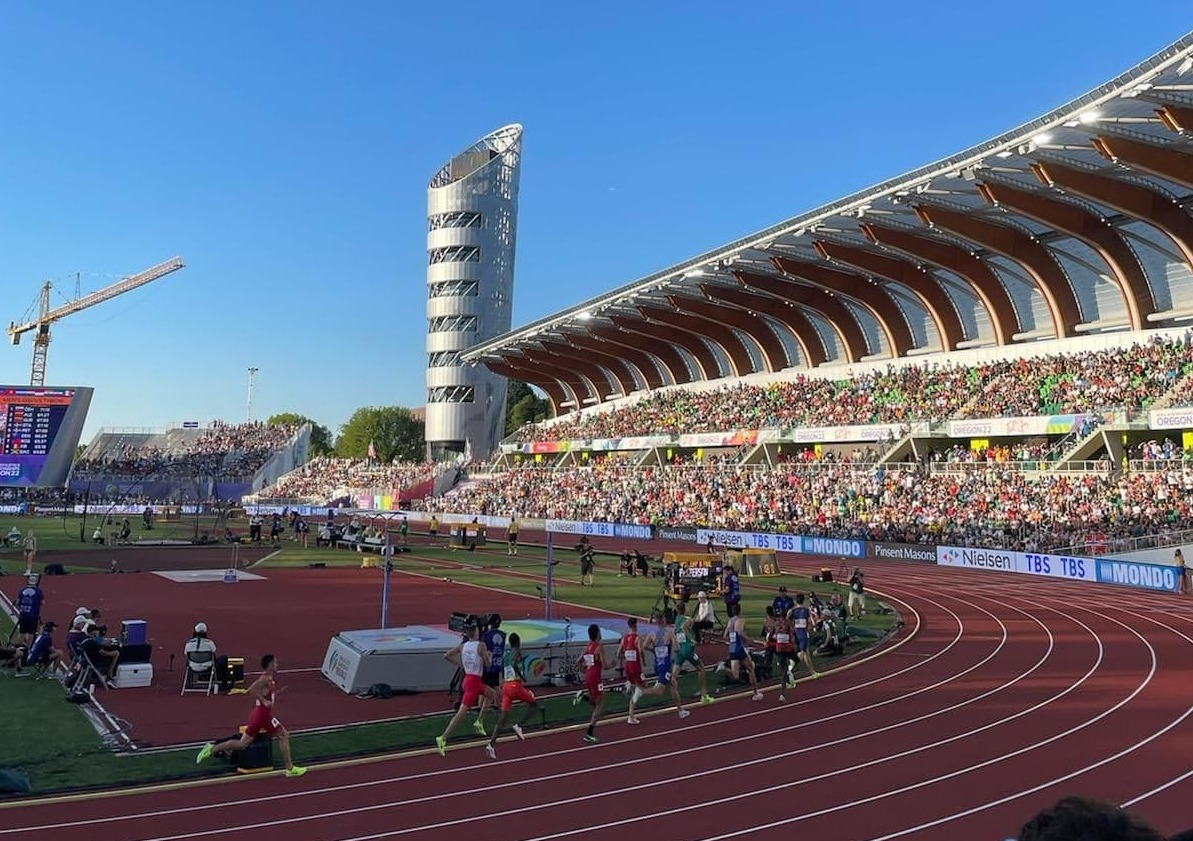
- Level: 2023 Diamond League

The 2023 Prefontaine Classic was the 48th edition of the annual outdoor track and field meeting in Eugene, Oregon, United States. Held on 16-17 September at Hayward Field, it served as the finals of 2023 Diamond League – the highest-level international track and field circuit. It was the first time that the Diamond League finals were held in the United States.

== Highlights ==
The first day of competition was highlighted by Jakob Ingebrigtsen running 3:43.73 in the Bowerman Mile – the fastest mile in 24 years – followed by Yared Nuguse in 3:43.97. In the women's steeplechase, Winfred Yavi ran the #2 time in history to win.

Grant Fisher broke his own American record in the 3,000 Meters, finishing in 3rd place with a time of 7:25.47.

On the final day, Ingebrigtsen won his second 2023 Diamond League title in the 3000 metres while running the third-fastest time in history. Second-place finisher Yomif Kejelcha, who was beat by just 0.01 seconds, was upset with the Diamond League hosting the finals over 3000 m instead of the standard 5000 metres distance, saying that benefitted Ingebrigtsen. Gudaf Tsegay also broke the 5000 metres world record by five seconds, running 14:00.21. The record was noted to be impressive because it occurred in sunny 70 °F (21 °C) sunny weather with 5 miles per hour (8.0 km/h) wind.

== Results ==
While Diamond League points were used to gain entry into the finals, they were not used to determine Diamond League champions. Regardless of points accumulated throughout the season, winners of the 2023 Prefontaine Classic were crowned 2023 Diamond League champions in their respective events, with the exception of Athing Mu who was a National Wildcard and thus ineligible for the Diamond League trophy.

=== Diamond Discipline ===
Men's 100m (+0.1 m/s)
Place	Athlete	Country	Time
1st place, gold medalist(s)	Christian Coleman	United States	9.83
2nd place, silver medalist(s)	Noah Lyles	United States	9.85
3rd place, bronze medalist(s)	Ferdinand Omanyala	Kenya	9.85
4	Kishane Thompson	Jamaica	9.87
5	Yohan Blake	Jamaica	10.08
6	Joshua Hartmann	Germany	10.30
7	Letsile Tebogo	Botswana	10.61
	Ackeem Blake	Jamaica	DQ
	Marvin Bracy	United States	~~10.01~~ DSQ

Men's 400m
Place	Athlete	Country	Time
1st place, gold medalist(s)	Kirani James	Grenada	44.30
2nd place, silver medalist(s)	Quincy Hall	United States	44.44
3rd place, bronze medalist(s)	Vernon Norwood	United States	44.61
4	Bryce Deadmon	United States	44.90
5	Rusheen McDonald	Jamaica	45.10
6	Leungo Scotch	Botswana	45.18
7	Gilles Biron	France	45.51
	Matthew Hudson-Smith	Great Britain	DNF
	Alexander Ogando	Dominican Republic	DQ

Men's Mile
Place	Athlete	Country	Time
1st place, gold medalist(s)	Jakob Ingebrigtsen	Norway	3:43.73
2nd place, silver medalist(s)	Yared Nuguse	United States	3:43.97
3rd place, bronze medalist(s)	George Mills	Great Britain	3:47.65
4	Mario García	Spain	3:47.69
5	Reynold Cheruiyot	Kenya	3:48.06
6	Cole Hocker	United States	3:48.08
7	Narve Gilje Nordås	Norway	3:48.24
8	Azeddine Habz	France	3:48.64
9	Niels Laros	Netherlands	3:48.93
10	Stewart McSweyn	Australia	3:49.32
11	Sam Tanner	New Zealand	3:49.51
12	Elliot Giles	Great Britain	3:51.63
13	Abel Kipsang	Kenya	3:53.50
	Cameron Myers	Australia	DNF
	Erik Sowinski	United States	DNF

Men's 400mH
Place	Athlete	Country	Time
1st place, gold medalist(s)	Rai Benjamin	United States	46.39
2nd place, silver medalist(s)	Karsten Warholm	Norway	46.53
3rd place, bronze medalist(s)	Kyron McMaster	British Virgin Islands	47.31
4	Alison dos Santos	Brazil	47.44
5	Wilfried Happio	France	47.83
6	Ludvy Vaillant	France	47.93
7	Rasmus Mägi	Estonia	47.99
8	Trevor Bassitt	United States	48.42
9	CJ Allen	United States	48.62

Men's 3000mSC
Place	Athlete	Country	Time
1st place, gold medalist(s)	Simon Koech	Kenya	8:06.26
2nd place, silver medalist(s)	Samuel Firewu	Ethiopia	8:10.74
3rd place, bronze medalist(s)	Geordie Beamish	New Zealand	8:14.01
4	Getnet Wale	Ethiopia	8:14.96
5	Ryuji Miura	Japan	8:15.45
6	Abraham Kibiwot	Kenya	8:16.27
7	Benjamin Kigen	Kenya	8:16.50
8	Amos Serem	Kenya	8:17.99
9	Abrham Sime	Ethiopia	8:20.08
10	Daniel Arce	Spain	8:31.53
	Craig Nowak	United States	DNF

Men's High Jump
Place	Athlete	Country	Mark
1st place, gold medalist(s)	Woo Sang-hyeok	South Korea	2.35 m
2nd place, silver medalist(s)	Norbert Kobielski	Poland	2.33 m
3rd place, bronze medalist(s)	JuVaughn Harrison	United States	2.33 m
4	Hamish Kerr	New Zealand	2.29 m
5	Andriy Protsenko	Ukraine	2.20 m
6	Thomas Carmoy	Belgium	2.20 m

Men's Triple Jump
Place	Athlete	Country	Mark
1st place, gold medalist(s)	Andy Díaz	Italy	17.43 m (+0.1 m/s)
2nd place, silver medalist(s)	Hugues Fabrice Zango	Burkina Faso	17.25 m (−0.3 m/s)
3rd place, bronze medalist(s)	Donald Scott	United States	16.84 m (+0.1 m/s)
4	Chris Benard	United States	16.07 m (+0.7 m/s)
	Will Claye	United States	NM

Men's Javelin Throw
Place	Athlete	Country	Mark
1st place, gold medalist(s)	Jakub Vadlejch	Czech Republic	84.24 m
2nd place, silver medalist(s)	Neeraj Chopra	India	83.80 m
3rd place, bronze medalist(s)	Oliver Helander	Finland	83.74 m
4	Andrian Mardare	Moldova	81.79 m
5	Curtis Thompson	United States	77.01 m
6	Anderson Peters	Grenada	74.71 m

Women's 100m (+0.8 m/s)
Place	Athlete	Country	Time
1st place, gold medalist(s)	Shericka Jackson	Jamaica	10.70
2nd place, silver medalist(s)	Marie-Josée Ta Lou	Ivory Coast	10.75
3rd place, bronze medalist(s)	Elaine Thompson-Herah	Jamaica	10.79
4	Sha'Carri Richardson	United States	10.80
5	Twanisha Terry	United States	10.83
6	Natasha Morrison	Jamaica	10.85
7	Dina Asher-Smith	Great Britain	10.96
8	Imani-Lara Lansiquot	Great Britain	11.01
9	Zoe Hobbs	New Zealand	11.18

Women's 1500m
Place	Athlete	Country	Time
1st place, gold medalist(s)	Faith Kipyegon	Kenya	3:50.72
2nd place, silver medalist(s)	Diribe Welteji	Ethiopia	3:53.93
3rd place, bronze medalist(s)	Laura Muir	Great Britain	3:55.16
4	Freweyni Hailu	Ethiopia	3:55.68
5	Linden Hall	Australia	3:56.92
6	Birke Haylom	Ethiopia	3:56.98
7	Hirut Meshesha	Ethiopia	3:57.53
8	Jessica Hull	Australia	3:57.57
9	Melissa Courtney-Bryant	Great Britain	3:59.57
10	Cory McGee	United States	4:01.28
11	Ciara Mageean	Ireland	4:03.09
12	Sinclaire Johnson	United States	4:03.21
13	Worknesh Mesele	Ethiopia	4:09.34
	Laurie Barton	United States	DNF

Women's 3000mSC
Place	Athlete	Country	Time
1st place, gold medalist(s)	Winfred Yavi	Bahrain	8:50.66
2nd place, silver medalist(s)	Beatrice Chepkoech	Kenya	8:51.67
3rd place, bronze medalist(s)	Faith Cherotich	Kenya	8:59.65
4	Jackline Chepkoech	Kenya	9:01.18
6	Maruša Mišmaš-Zrimšek	Slovenia	9:08.11
7	Sembo Almayew	Ethiopia	9:13.08
8	Marwa Bouzayani	Tunisia	9:17.15
9	Courtney Wayment	United States	9:20.69
10	Alice Finot	France	9:41.09
	Zerfe Wondemagegn	Ethiopia	~~9:05.36~~ DSQ
	Peruth Chemutai	Uganda	DNF

Women's Pole Vault
Place	Athlete	Country	Mark
1st place, gold medalist(s)	Katie Moon	United States	4.86 m
2nd place, silver medalist(s)	Tina Šutej	Slovenia	4.81 m
3rd place, bronze medalist(s)	Sandi Morris	United States	4.71 m
4	Wilma Murto	Finland	4.71 m
5	Nina Kennedy	Australia	4.56 m
6	Roberta Bruni	Italy	4.56 m

Women's Triple Jump
Place	Athlete	Country	Mark
1st place, gold medalist(s)	Yulimar Rojas	Venezuela	15.35 m (+1.2 m/s)
2nd place, silver medalist(s)	Shanieka Ricketts	Jamaica	15.03 m (±0.0 m/s)
3rd place, bronze medalist(s)	Kimberly Williams	Jamaica	14.61 m (−0.1 m/s)
4	Dariya Derkach	Italy	14.52 m (+0.8 m/s)
5	Thea LaFond	Dominica	14.46 m (+0.3 m/s)

Women's Shot Put
Place	Athlete	Country	Mark
1st place, gold medalist(s)	Chase Jackson	United States	20.76 m
2nd place, silver medalist(s)	Sarah Mitton	Canada	19.94 m
3rd place, bronze medalist(s)	Auriol Dongmo	Portugal	19.92 m
4	Jessica Schilder	Netherlands	19.88 m
5	Maggie Ewen	United States	19.82 m
6	Danniel Thomas-Dodd	Jamaica	19.17 m

Women's Javelin Throw
Place	Athlete	Country	Mark
1st place, gold medalist(s)	Haruka Kitaguchi	Japan	63.78 m
2nd place, silver medalist(s)	Tori Peeters	New Zealand	61.30 m
3rd place, bronze medalist(s)	Mackenzie Little	Australia	61.24 m
4	Maggie Malone	United States	60.42 m
5	Līna Mūze	Latvia	59.69 m
6	Victoria Hudson	Austria	57.99 m
7	Liveta Jasiūnaitė	Lithuania	57.45 m

Men's 200m (+0.6 m/s)
Place	Athlete	Country	Time
1st place, gold medalist(s)	Andre De Grasse	Canada	19.76
2nd place, silver medalist(s)	Kenny Bednarek	United States	19.95
3rd place, bronze medalist(s)	Erriyon Knighton	United States	19.97
4	Alexander Ogando	Dominican Republic	20.08
5	Kyree King	United States	20.16
6	Aaron Brown	Canada	20.23
7	Joseph Fahnbulleh	Liberia	20.38

Men's 800m
Place	Athlete	Country	Time
1st place, gold medalist(s)	Emmanuel Wanyonyi	Kenya	1:42.80
2nd place, silver medalist(s)	Marco Arop	Canada	1:42.85
3rd place, bronze medalist(s)	Djamel Sedjati	Algeria	1:43.06
4	Yanis Meziane	France	1:43.94
5	Daniel Rowden	Great Britain	1:44.21
6	Bryce Hoppel	United States	1:44.63
7	Benjamin Robert	France	1:45.43
8	Saúl Ordóñez	Spain	1:45.90
9	Wyclife Kinyamal	Kenya	1:46.33
	Navasky Anderson	Jamaica	DNF

Men's 3000m
Place	Athlete	Country	Time
1st place, gold medalist(s)	Jakob Ingebrigtsen	Norway	7:23.63
2nd place, silver medalist(s)	Yomif Kejelcha	Ethiopia	7:23.64
3rd place, bronze medalist(s)	Grant Fisher	United States	7:25.47
4	Telahun Haile Bekele	Ethiopia	7:25.48
5	Selemon Barega	Ethiopia	7:26.28
6	Berihu Aregawi	Ethiopia	7:28.38
7	Luis Grijalva	Guatemala	7:29.43
8	Stewart McSweyn	Australia	7:31.14
9	Brian Fay	Ireland	7:54.73
	Sam Prakel	United States	DNF
	Getnet Wale	Ethiopia	DNF
	Craig Nowak	United States	DNF

Men's 110mH (+0.9 m/s)
Place	Athlete	Country	Time
1st place, gold medalist(s)	Hansle Parchment	Jamaica	12.93
2nd place, silver medalist(s)	Grant Holloway	United States	13.06
3rd place, bronze medalist(s)	Daniel Roberts	United States	13.07
4	Shunsuke Izumiya	Japan	13.10
5	Jason Joseph	Switzerland	13.12
6	Freddie Crittenden	United States	13.15
7	Cordell Tinch	United States	13.21
8	Jamal Britt	United States	13.36
9	Just Kwaou-Mathey	France	13.46

Men's Pole Vault
Place	Athlete	Country	Mark
1st place, gold medalist(s)	Armand Duplantis	Sweden	6.23 m
2nd place, silver medalist(s)	EJ Obiena	Philippines	5.82 m
3rd place, bronze medalist(s)	Sam Kendricks	United States	5.72 m
4	Kurtis Marschall	Australia	5.72 m
5	Chris Nilsen	United States	5.72 m
6	Ben Broeders	Belgium	5.52 m
7	KC Lightfoot	United States	5.52 m

Men's Long Jump
Place	Athlete	Country	Mark
1st place, gold medalist(s)	Simon Ehammer	Switzerland	8.22 m (±0.0 m/s)
2nd place, silver medalist(s)	Tajay Gayle	Jamaica	8.22 m (+2.6 m/s)
3rd place, bronze medalist(s)	Yuki Hashioka	Japan	8.15 m (+1.2 m/s)
4	Radek Juška	Czech Republic	8.10 m (+1.2 m/s)
5	Jarrion Lawson	United States	8.02 m (+1.3 m/s)
6	Will Williams	United States	7.99 m (+1.5 m/s)
7	LaQuan Nairn	Bahamas	7.27 m (+0.5 m/s)
Best wind-legal performances
	Tajay Gayle	Jamaica	8.08 m (+0.2 m/s)

Men's Shot Put
Place	Athlete	Country	Mark
1st place, gold medalist(s)	Joe Kovacs	United States	22.93 m
2nd place, silver medalist(s)	Ryan Crouser	United States	22.91 m
3rd place, bronze medalist(s)	Tom Walsh	New Zealand	22.69 m
4	Leonardo Fabbri	Italy	22.31 m
5	Payton Otterdahl	United States	21.43 m
6	Filip Mihaljević	Croatia	20.98 m

Men's Discus Throw
Place	Athlete	Country	Mark
1st place, gold medalist(s)	Matthew Denny	Australia	68.43 m
2nd place, silver medalist(s)	Kristjan Čeh	Slovenia	67.64 m
3rd place, bronze medalist(s)	Daniel Ståhl	Sweden	67.36 m
4	Andrius Gudžius	Lithuania	65.47 m
5	Lawrence Okoye	Great Britain	65.23 m
6	Sam Mattis	United States	64.51 m

Women's 200m (+0.3 m/s)
Place	Athlete	Country	Time
1st place, gold medalist(s)	Shericka Jackson	Jamaica	21.57
2nd place, silver medalist(s)	Marie-Josée Ta Lou	Ivory Coast	22.10
3rd place, bronze medalist(s)	Anthonique Strachan	Bahamas	22.16
4	Twanisha Terry	United States	22.21
5	Daryll Neita	Great Britain	22.35
6	Kayla White	United States	22.49
7	Jenna Prandini	United States	22.68
8	Tasa Jiya	Netherlands	22.92
9	Gémima Joseph	France	23.62

Women's 400m
Place	Athlete	Country	Time
1st place, gold medalist(s)	Marileidy Paulino	Dominican Republic	49.58
2nd place, silver medalist(s)	Natalia Kaczmarek	Poland	50.38
3rd place, bronze medalist(s)	Lieke Klaver	Netherlands	50.47
4	Candice McLeod	Jamaica	50.76
5	Sada Williams	Barbados	51.07
6	Victoria Ohuruogu	Great Britain	51.15
7	Lynna Irby	United States	51.60
8	Aliyah Abrams	Guyana	51.97

Women's 800m
Place	Athlete	Country	Time
1st place, gold medalist(s)	Athing Mu	United States	1:54.97
2nd place, silver medalist(s)	Keely Hodgkinson	Great Britain	1:55.19
3rd place, bronze medalist(s)	Natoya Goule	Jamaica	1:55.96
4	Mary Moraa	Kenya	1:57.42
5	Halimah Nakaayi	Uganda	1:58.34
6	Catriona Bisset	Australia	1:58.35
7	Rénelle Lamote	France	1:58.51
8	Sage Hurta	United States	1:59.65
9	Jemma Reekie	Great Britain	2:00.34
	Kaylin Whitney	United States	DNF

Women's 5000m
Place	Athlete	Country	Time
1st place, gold medalist(s)	Gudaf Tsegay	Ethiopia	14:00.21
2nd place, silver medalist(s)	Beatrice Chebet	Kenya	14:05.92
3rd place, bronze medalist(s)	Ejgayehu Taye	Ethiopia	14:21.52
4	Lilian Kasait Rengeruk	Kenya	14:40.81
5	Lemlem Hailu	Ethiopia	14:42.29
6	Nozomi Tanaka	Japan	14:42.38
7	Alicia Monson	United States	14:45.98
8	Weini Kelati	United States	15:25.62
	Elise Cranny	United States	DNF
	Birke Haylom	Ethiopia	DNF
	Sinclaire Johnson	United States	DNF

Women's 100mH (+1.8 m/s)
Place	Athlete	Country	Time
1st place, gold medalist(s)	Tobi Amusan	Nigeria	12.33
2nd place, silver medalist(s)	Jasmine Camacho-Quinn	Puerto Rico	12.38
3rd place, bronze medalist(s)	Kendra Harrison	United States	12.44
4	Danielle Williams	Jamaica	12.47
5	Megan Tapper	Jamaica	12.48
6	Alaysha Johnson	United States	12.48
7	Nia Ali	United States	12.62
8	Pia Skrzyszowska	Poland	12.81
9	Tia Jones	United States	12.82

Women's 400mH
Place	Athlete	Country	Time
1st place, gold medalist(s)	Femke Bol	Netherlands	51.98
2nd place, silver medalist(s)	Shamier Little	United States	53.45
3rd place, bronze medalist(s)	Rushell Clayton	Jamaica	53.56
4	Janieve Russell	Jamaica	53.60
5	Anna Cockrell	United States	54.48
6	Ayomide Folorunso	Italy	54.68
7	Gianna Woodruff	Panama	54.95
8	Anna Ryzhykova	Ukraine	54.98
9	Viktoriya Tkachuk	Ukraine	55.48

Women's High Jump
Place	Athlete	Country	Mark
1st place, gold medalist(s)	Yaroslava Mahuchikh	Ukraine	2.03 m
2nd place, silver medalist(s)	Nicola Olyslagers	Australia	2.03 m
3rd place, bronze medalist(s)	Angelina Topić	Serbia	1.95 m
4	Morgan Lake	Great Britain	1.91 m
5	Yuliya Levchenko	Ukraine	1.91 m
6	Vashti Cunningham	United States	1.91 m
7	Iryna Herashchenko	Ukraine	1.87 m

Women's Long Jump
Place	Athlete	Country	Mark
1st place, gold medalist(s)	Ivana Španović	Serbia	6.85 m (+0.2 m/s)
2nd place, silver medalist(s)	Ese Brume	Nigeria	6.85 m (±0.0 m/s)
3rd place, bronze medalist(s)	Quanesha Burks	United States	6.77 m (+0.2 m/s)
4	Brooke Buschkuehl	Australia	6.71 m (+1.0 m/s)
5	Jazmin Sawyers	Great Britain	6.68 m (−2.6 m/s)
6	Taliyah Brooks	United States	6.45 m (±0.0 m/s)

Women's Discus Throw
Place	Athlete	Country	Mark
1st place, gold medalist(s)	Valarie Allman	United States	68.66 m
2nd place, silver medalist(s)	Laulauga Tausaga	United States	68.36 m
3rd place, bronze medalist(s)	Sandra Perković	Croatia	66.85 m
4	Jorinde van Klinken	Netherlands	66.03 m
5	Kristin Pudenz	Germany	62.96 m
6	Claudine Vita	Germany	61.51 m
7	Mélina Robert-Michon	France	61.26 m
