= 2022 World Athletics Championships – Women's shot put =

Women's shot put at the 2022 World Championships
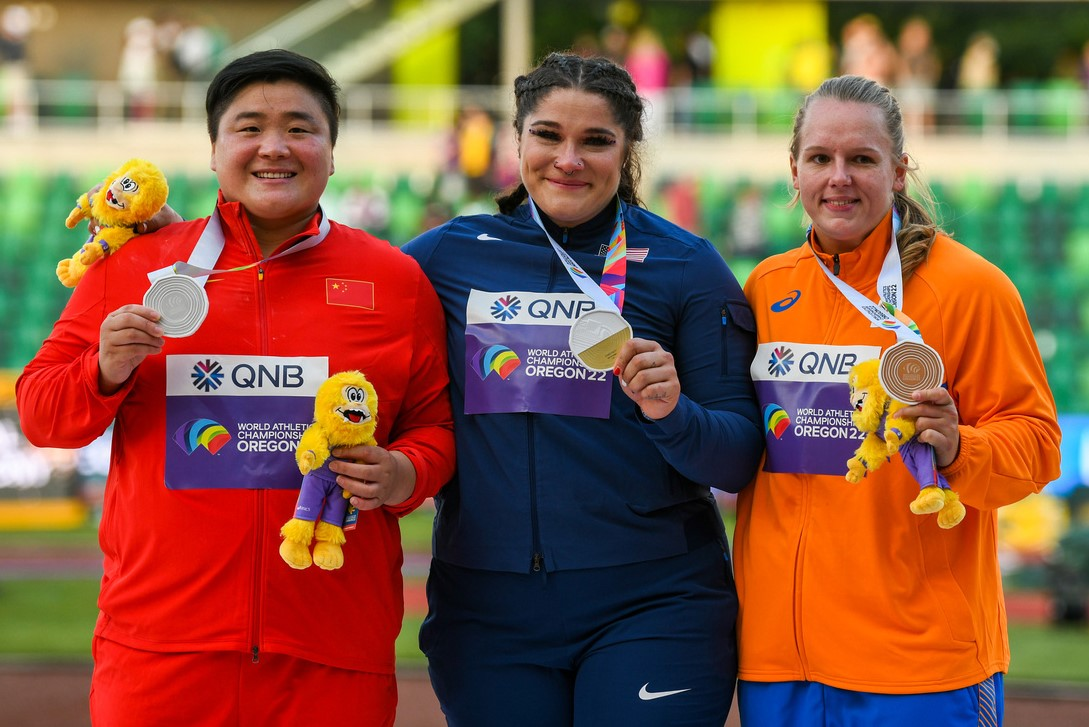
- The medal ceremony of the event.
- Venue: Hayward Field
- Dates: 15 July (qualification); 16 July (final)
- Competitors: 31 from 16 nations
- Winning distance: 20.49 m

Medalists
gold medal	Chase Ealey	United States
silver medal	Gong Lijiao	China
bronze medal	Jessica Schilder	Netherlands

Video on YouTube Official Video

The women's shot put at the 2022 World Athletics Championships was held at the Hayward Field in Eugene on 15 and 16 July 2022.

== Summary ==
Three weeks after winning the American Championship with a world leading 20.51 m, Chase Ealey returned to the same ring. On the very first throw of the competition, she popped a 20.49 m (67 ft 2 1/2 in). Double defending champion and Olympic Gold Medalist Gong Lijiao threw 19.77 m to settle into second place, with Auriol Dongmo at 19.44 m and Gong's Chinese teammate Song Jiayuan at 19.21 m being the only other ones past 19 metres. In the second round, Gong improved her hold on second place with a 19.84 m, which became significant when Dongmo improved to 19.62 m two throws later. Next in the ring, Jessica Schilder took away the bronze medal position with a Dutch record of 19.77 m. By that point in the second round, the medal positions were settled. Gong improved to 20.23 m in the third round and 20.39 m in the fifth round, but still fell 10 cm short of Ealey. Schilder tied her national record in the fifth round, which became the tiebreaker after Sarah Mitton had equalled the 19.77 m three throws earlier.

== Records ==
Before the competition, records were as follows:

Record	Athlete & Nat.	Perf.	Location	Date
World record	Natalya Lisovskaya (URS)	22.63 m	Moscow, Soviet Union	7 June 1987
Championship record	Natalya Lisovskaya (URS)	21.24 m	Rome, Italy	5 September 1987
Championship record	Valerie Adams (NZL)	21.24 m	Daegu, South Korea	29 August 2011
World Leading	Chase Ealey (USA)	20.51 m	Eugene, United States	26 June 2022
African Record	Vivian Chukwuemeka (NGR)	18.43 m	Walnut, United States	19 April 2003
Asian Record	Li Meisu (CHN)	21.76 m	Shanghai, China	23 April 1988
North, Central American and Caribbean record	Belsy Laza (CUB)	20.96 m	Mexico City, Mexico	2 May 1992
South American Record	Elisângela Adriano (BRA)	19.30 m	Tunja, Colombia	14 July 2001
European Record	Natalya Lisovskaya (URS)	22.63 m	Moscow, Soviet Union	7 June 1987
Oceanian record	Valerie Adams (NZL)	21.24 m	Daegu, South Korea	29 August 2011

== Qualification standard ==
The standard to qualify automatically for entry was 18.50 m.

== Schedule ==
The event schedule, in local time (UTC−7), was as follows:

Date	Time	Round
15 July	17:05	Qualification
16 July	18:25	Final

== Results ==
=== Qualification ===
Qualification: Qualifying Performance 18.90 (Q) or at least 12 best performers (q) advanced to the final.

Rank	Group	Name	Nationality	Round			Mark	Notes
Rank	Group	Name	Nationality	1	2	3	Mark	Notes
1	B	Gong Lijiao	China	18.74	19.51		19.51	Q, SB
2	B	Sarah Mitton	Canada	18.16	19.38		19.38	Q
3	A	Auriol Dongmo	Portugal	19.38			19.38	Q
4	B	Jessica Schilder	Netherlands	19.16			19.16	Q
5	B	Danniel Thomas-Dodd	Jamaica	19.09			19.09	Q
6	A	Song Jiayuan	China	18.33	19.08		19.08	Q
7	B	Jessica Woodard	United States	17.80	17.74	19.08	19.08	Q
8	A	Maddison-Lee Wesche	New Zealand	18.64	18.60	18.96	18.96	Q
9	A	Maggie Ewen	United States	17.14	17.58	18.96	18.96	Q
10	B	Chase Ealey	United States	18.96			18.96	Q
11	A	Fanny Roos	Sweden	18.53	18.72	18.41	18.72	q
12	B	Axelina Johansson	Sweden	17.47	18.57	18.50	18.57	q, PB
13	B	Katharina Maisch	Germany	17.84	x	18.57	18.57	
14	A	Adelaide Aquilla	United States	x	18.18	18.33	18.33	
15	A	Julia Ritter	Germany	18.22	x	x	18.22	
16	A	Jorinde van Klinken	Netherlands	18.02	18.19	x	18.19	
17	B	Jessica Inchude	Portugal	17.39	17.65	18.01	18.01	
18	A	Lloydricia Cameron	Jamaica	17.65	x	x	17.65	
19	A	Zhang Linru	China	16.73	x	17.54	17.54	
20	A	Benthe König	Netherlands	17.30	17.25	17.51	17.51	
21	B	María Belén Toimil	Spain	x	16.75	17.48	17.48	
22	A	Amelia Strickler	Great Britain & N.I.	16.16	16.31	17.40	17.40	
23	B	Sophie McKinna	Great Britain & N.I.	17.21	16.77	17.13	17.21	
24	A	Dimitriana Bezede	Moldova	x	16.99	x	16.99	
25	B	Portious Warren	Trinidad and Tobago	x	x	16.65	16.65	
26	B	Ana Caroline Silva	Brazil	x	16.58	x	16.58	
27	B	Ivana Gallardo	Chile	15.64	16.20	15.36	16.20	
28	A	Livia Avancini	Brazil	15.87	16.01	16.13	16.13	
29	B	Ischke Senekal	South Africa	x	x	15.40	15.40	

=== Final ===
Rank	Name	Nationality	Round						Mark	Notes
Rank	Name	Nationality	1	2	3	4	5	6	Mark	Notes
1st place, gold medalist(s)	Chase Ealey	United States	20.49	19.82	x	20.07	19.65	x	20.49	
2nd place, silver medalist(s)	Gong Lijiao	China	19.58	19.84	20.23	20.08	20.39	19.89	20.39	SB
3rd place, bronze medalist(s)	Jessica Schilder	Netherlands	x	19.77	x	19.53	19.77	x	19.77	NR
4	Sarah Mitton	Canada	18.78	19.18	19.04	x	19.06	19.77	19.77	
5	Auriol Dongmo	Portugal	19.44	19.62	19.38	x	19.39	19.54	19.62	
6	Song Jiayuan	China	19.21	19.06	x	19.49	19.57	x	19.57	
7	Maddison-Lee Wesche	New Zealand	18.32	19.09	18.56	18.81	18.36	19.50	19.50	PB
8	Jessica Woodard	United States	x	x	18.67	x	18.63	x	18.67	
9	Maggie Ewen	United States	18.08	18.26	18.64				18.64	
10	Danniel Thomas-Dodd	Jamaica	x	18.29	x				18.29	
11	Fanny Roos	Sweden	18.27	18.22	x				18.27	
12	Axelina Johansson	Sweden	17.21	17.60	17.25				17.60	
