= Athletics at the 2024 Summer Olympics – Women's shot put =

Women's shot put at the Games of the XXXIII Olympiad
- Venue: Stade de France, Paris, France
- Date: 8 August 2024 (qualification) 9 August 2024 (final)
- Winning distance: 20.00 m

Medalists
1st place, gold medalist(s)		Yemisi Ogunleye	Germany
2nd place, silver medalist(s)		Maddi Wesche	New Zealand
3rd place, bronze medalist(s)		Song Jiayuan	China

The women's shot put at the 2024 Summer Olympics was held in Paris, France, on 8 and 9 August 2024. This was the 20th time that the event was contested at the Summer Olympics.

== Summary ==
The top two from Tokyo returned; Gong Lijiao and Raven Saunders. Bronze medalist Valerie Adams retired with a complete set of medals including two golds. Gong got silver at the 2022 World Championships and bronze in 2023. Chase Ealey, now married competing as Chase Jackson, won 2022 and 2023. Jessica Schilder won bronze in 2022, Sarah Mitton was silver in 2023 and came to Paris as the 2024 world leader. Mitton, Schilder and Jackson were over 20 metres several times in 2024, Yemisi Ogunleye and Jaida Ross managed it once.

Two-time defending world champion Jackson surprisingly failed to qualify for the final. In the rain, Jaida Ross with the first throw of the competition started the action off with 19.28m. On her first time in the slippery ring, Ogunleye slipped and fell, unable to complete the attempt. Only Gong got over 19 with a 19.08m in the first round, Fanny Roos ended the round in third place at 18.47m. Maddi Wesche, whose previous top credential was 4th place at the World Indoor Championships earlier in the year, took the lead with a 19.58m. In the second round, Ogunleye tossed a 19.55m to get close to the lead. The big shock at the end of the third round was world leader Mitton missing out on a spot in the top eight, managing a best throw of only 17.48 m in the second round. World number two Schilder also struggled, with her throw of 18.91 m in the third round being her only legal throw of the entire competition. Nobody was able to beat 19 meters in the third round so when they re-ordered, Wesche had earned the final throw of the subsequent rounds. In the fourth round Song Jiayuan, 5th place at the previous Olympics put her way into third with a 19.32m. In the fifth round, Gong improved to 19.27m but it didn't get her out of fifth place. Ogunleye got off a 19.73m to take the lead. With the last throw of the round, Wesche had an answer, a personal best 19.86m to return to the top. Everyone was down to their last throw, but nobody could improve until Ogunleye. She launched a throw of 20 m (65 ft 7 1/4 in) to take the lead. Wesche had the opportunity to answer again, but could only manage a 19.68m.

== Background ==
The women's shot put has been present on the Olympic athletics programme since 1948.

Global records before the 2024 Summer Olympics
Record	Athlete (Nation)	Distance (m)	Location	Date
World record	Natalya Lisovskaya (URS)	22.63	Moscow, Soviet Union	7 June 1987
Olympic record	Ilona Slupianek (GDR)	22.41	Moscow, Soviet Union	24 July 1980
World leading	Sarah Mitton (CAN)	20.68	Fleetwood, United States	11 May 2024

Area records before the 2024 Summer Olympics
Area Record	Athlete (Nation)	Distance (m)
Africa (records)	Vivian Chukwuemeka (NGR)	18.43
Asia (records)	Li Meisu (CHN)	21.76
Europe (records)	Natalya Lisovskaya (URS)	22.63 WR
North, Central America and Caribbean (records)	Belsy Laza (CUB)	20.96
Oceania (records)	Valerie Adams (NZL)	21.24
South America (records)	Elisângela Adriano (BRA)	19.30

== Qualification ==
For the women's shot put event, the qualification period was between 1 July 2023 and 30 June 2024. 32 athletes were able to qualify for the event, with a maximum of three athletes per nation, by throwing the entry standard of 18.80 m or further or by their World Athletics Ranking for this event.

== Results ==
=== Qualification ===
The qualification has been held on 8 August. 32 athletes qualified for the first round by qualification time or world ranking.

Rank	Group	Athlete	Nation	1	2	3	Distance	Notes
1	A	Sarah Mitton	Canada	19.77			19.77	Q
2	A	Maddi Wesche	New Zealand	18.59	19.25		19.25	Q
3	B	Yemisi Ogunleye	Germany	18.01	17.72	19.24	19.24	Q
4	B	Jessica Schilder	Netherlands	x	18.86	18.92	18.92	q
5	B	Gong Lijiao	China	18.06	18.78	x	18.78	q
6	A	Song Jiayuan	China	17.65	18.22	18.73	18.73	q
7	B	Raven Saunders	United States	x	17.93	18.62	18.62	q
8	A	Jaida Ross	United States	18.58	18.21	x	18.58	q
9	A	Jessica Inchude	Portugal	x	18.36	x	18.36	q
10	B	Fanny Roos	Sweden	17.66	18.17	17.69	18.17	q
11	A	Alina Kenzel	Germany	18.16	18.09	x	18.16	q
12	A	Axelina Johansson	Sweden	x	18.16	17.73	18.16	q
13	B	Danniel Thomas-Dodd	Jamaica	x	18.12	16.87	18.12	
14	A	Lloydricia Cameron	Jamaica	18.01	17.71	18.02	18.02	SB
15	B	Eliana Bandeira	Portugal	16.86	17.97	17.76	17.97	
16	B	Katharina Maisch	Germany	17.45	17.86	x	17.86	
17	A	Chase Jackson	United States	x	x	17.60	17.60	
18	A	Ivana Xennia Gallardo	Chile	17.47	16.64	16.13	17.47	
19	B	Klaudia Kardasz	Poland	x	17.08	17.45	17.45	
20	A	Erna Sóley Gunnarsdóttir	Iceland	17.34	17.39	17.29	17.39	
21	A	Sun Yue	China	x	17.33	x	17.33	
22	B	Portious Warren	Trinidad and Tobago	17.02	16.28	17.22	17.22	
23	B	Ana Caroline Silva	Brazil	17.09	x	16.67	17.09	
24	A	Emel Dereli	Turkey	17.02	x	16.71	17.02	
25	B	María Belén Toimil	Spain	x	16.83	x	16.83	
26	B	Alida van Daalen	Netherlands	16.25	x	16.53	16.53	
27	B	Dimitriana Bezede	Moldova	16.30	15.89	16.35	16.35	
28	A	Jorinde van Klinken	Netherlands	16.35	x	x	16.35	
29	A	Livia Avancini	Brazil	16.26	x	15.85	16.26	
30	B	Natalia Ducó	Chile	x	16.11	x	16.11	
31	A	Miné de Klerk	South Africa	15.63	x	x	15.63	

=== Final ===
The final has been held on 9 August.

Rank	Athlete	Nation	1	2	3	4	5	6	Distance	Notes
1st place, gold medalist(s)	Yemisi Ogunleye	Germany	x	19.55	x	18.75	19.73	20.00	20.00	
2nd place, silver medalist(s)	Maddi Wesche	New Zealand	x	19.58	18.54	19.10	19.86	19.68	19.86	PB
3rd place, bronze medalist(s)	Song Jiayuan	China	16.43	18.88	18.78	19.32	x	19.21	19.32	
4	Jaida Ross	United States	19.28	x	x	x	18.79	18.75	19.28	
5	Gong Lijiao	China	19.09	19.06	x	x	19.27	19.00	19.27	
6	Jessica Schilder	Netherlands	x	x	18.91	x	x	x	18.91	
7	Fanny Roos	Sweden	18.47	18.78	x	18.48	x	18.13	18.78	
8	Jessica Inchude	Portugal	18.16	18.41	x	18.32	x	x	18.41	
9	Alina Kenzel	Germany	18.19	x	18.29				18.29	
10	Axelina Johansson	Sweden	18.03	x	x				18.03	
11	Raven Saunders	United States	x	16.92	17.79				17.79	
12	Sarah Mitton	Canada	17.15	17.48	x				17.48	
