= 2025 World Athletics Indoor Championships – Women's shot put =

Women's shot put at the 2025 World Athletics Indoor Championships
- Venue: Nanjing's Cube at Nanjing Youth Olympic Sports Park
- Location: Nanjing, China
- Dates: 21 March 2025
- Competitors: 16 from 9 nations
- Winning distance: 20.48 m

Medalists
gold medal	Sarah Mitton	Canada
silver medal	Jessica Schilder	Netherlands
bronze medal	Chase Jackson	United States

The women's shot put at the 2025 World Athletics Indoor Championships was held at the Nanjing's Cube of the Nanjing Youth Olympic Sports Park in Nanjing, China, on 21 March 2025. It was the 21st time the event was contested at the World Athletics Indoor Championships. Athletes qualified by achieving the entry standard or by their World Athletics Ranking in the event.

Canadian Sarah Mitton won her second consecutive event title. All three medalists threw a distance of at least twenty metres, the first time that had happened since 1991.

== Background ==
The women's shot put was contested 20 times before 2025, at every previous edition of the World Athletics Indoor Championships.

Records before the 2025 World Athletics Indoor Championships
Record	Athlete (nation)	Distance (m)	Location	Date
World record	Helena Fibingerová (TCH)	22.50	Jablonec, Czechoslovakia	19 February 1977
Championship record	Valerie Adams (NZL)	20.67	Sopot, Poland	8 March 2014
World leading	Jessica Schilder (NED)	20.69	Apeldoorn, Netherlands	9 March 2025

== Qualification ==
For the women's shot put, the qualification period ran from 1 September 2024 until 9 March 2025. Athletes could qualify by achieving the entry standards of 19.50 m. Athletes could also qualify by virtue of their World Athletics Ranking for the event or by virtue of their World Athletics Indoor Tour wildcard. There was a target number of 16 athletes.

== Results ==
The final was held on 21 March, starting at 19:50 (UTC+8).

Results of the final
Place	Athlete	Nation	#1	#2	#3	#4	#5	#6	Result	Notes
1st place, gold medalist(s)	Sarah Mitton	Canada	19.61	20.36	19.28	20.15	x	20.48	20.48 m	
2nd place, silver medalist(s)	Jessica Schilder	Netherlands	x	20.07	19.22	19.67	x	19.26	20.07 m	
3rd place, bronze medalist(s)	Chase Jackson	United States	18.12	19.40	19.91	19.67	18.97	20.06	20.06 m	
4	Fanny Roos	Sweden	18.44	17.80	17.95	18.72	19.28	x	19.28 m	SB
5	Gong Lijiao	China	18.64	18.84	x	x	18.68	18.70	18.84 m	
6	Jessica Inchude	Portugal	17.64	18.66	18.71	18.70	x	18.50	18.71 m	
7	Maggie Ewen	United States	17.06	18.63	x	18.29	18.17		18.63 m	
8	Auriol Dongmo	Portugal	18.39	x	18.27	18.54	x		18.54 m	
9	Sara Lennman	Sweden	17.46	18.29	18.45	18.01			18.45 m	PB
10	Ma Yue	China	x	17.41	18.31	x			18.31 m	SB
11	Jessica Ramsey	United States	17.57	17.81	x				17.81 m	
12	Jorinde van Klinken	Netherlands	x	17.72	16.91				17.72 m	
13	Lloydricia Cameron	Jamaica	17.43	17.14	x				17.43 m	
14	Ivana Gallardo	Chile	16.64	16.38	17.08				17.08 m	
15	Madison-Lee Wesche	New Zealand	x	16.52	x				16.52 m	
16	Kaia Topu-South	New Zealand	16.45	16.20	x				16.45 m	
