= Athletics at the 2022 Commonwealth Games – Women's shot put =

Women's shot put at the 2022 Commonwealth Games
- Venue: Alexander Stadium
- Dates: 2 August (qualification); 3 August (final)
- Competitors: 13 from 10 nations
- Winning distance: 19.03 m

Medalists
gold medal	Sarah Mitton	Canada
silver medal	Danniel Thomas-Dodd	Jamaica
bronze medal	Maddi Wesche	New Zealand

The women's shot put at the 2022 Commonwealth Games, as part of the athletics programme, took place in the Alexander Stadium on 2 and 3 August 2022.

== Records ==
Prior to this competition, the existing world and Games records were as follows:

World record	Natalya Lisovskaya (URS)	22.63 m	Moscow, Soviet Union	7 June 1987
Commonwealth record	Valerie Adams (NZL)	21.24 m	Daegu, South Korea	29 August 2011
Games record	Valerie Adams (NZL)	20.47 m	Delhi, India	9 October 2010

== Schedule ==
The schedule was as follows:

Date	Time	Round
Tuesday 2 August 2022	11:00	Qualification
Wednesday 3 August 2022	20:05	Final

All times are British Summer Time (UTC+1)

== Results ==
=== Qualification ===
Across two groups, those who threw ≥18.00 m (Q) or at least the 12 best performers (q) advanced to the final.

Rank	Group	Athlete	#1	#2	#3	Result	Notes
1	B	Danniel Thomas-Dodd (JAM)	18.42			18.42	Q
2	A	Sarah Mitton (CAN)	18.24			18.24	Q
3	B	Maddi Wesche (NZL)	18.08			18.08	Q
4	A	Adele Nicoll (WAL)	17.19	17.30	r	17.30	q
5	A	Amelia Strickler (ENG)	15.80	16.54	17.10	17.10	q
6	B	Divine Oladipo (ENG)	16.03	16.52	17.09	17.09	q
7	B	Manpreet Kaur (IND)	15.83	16.68	16.78	16.78	q
8	A	Sophie McKinna (ENG)	16.70	–		16.70	q
9	A	Lloydricria Cameron (JAM)	16.61	16.60	x	16.61	q
10	B	Orobosa Frank (NGR)	16.27	16.26	13.79	16.27	q
11	B	Nu'u Tuilefano (SAM)	16.10	14.87	15.50	16.10	q
12	A	ʻAta Maama Tuutafaiva (TGA)	15.37	15.35	15.32	15.37	q
13	A	Trevia Gumbs (IVB)	x	13.27	x	13.27	

=== Final ===
The medals were determined in the final.

Rank	Name	#1	#2	#3	#4	#5	#6	Result	Notes
1st place, gold medalist(s)	Sarah Mitton (CAN)	17.13	17.33	17.77	17.83	18.29	19.03	19.03	
2nd place, silver medalist(s)	Danniel Thomas-Dodd (JAM)	17.98	x	18.98	x	x	x	18.98	
3rd place, bronze medalist(s)	Maddi Wesche (NZL)	18.84	18.54	17.86	x	x	18.42	18.84	
4	Lloydricria Cameron (JAM)	17.56	x	17.60	16.90	17.52	17.62	17.62	
5	Divine Oladipo (ENG)	x	17.28	16.90	x	16.92	x	17.28	
6	Amelia Strickler (ENG)	17.13	16.46	16.65	17.18	16.71	x	17.18	
7	Sophie McKinna (ENG)	15.10	17.12	16.47	16.32	16.27	17.18	17.18	
8	Adele Nicoll (WAL)	17.08	16.74	17.03	16.50	17.05	17.02	17.08	
9	Orobosa Frank (NGR)	16.70	15.93	16.20				16.70	
10	ʻAta Maama Tuutafaiva (TGA)	15.80	16.30	15.90				16.30	SB
11	Nu'u Tuilefano (SAM)	x	15.81	15.43				15.81	
12	Manpreet Kaur (IND)	15.57	15.56	15.59				15.59	
