= Ivana Gallardo =

Chilean athlete (born 1993)

Personal information
- Full name: Ivana Xennia Gallardo Cruchet
- Born: 20 July 1993 (age 33) Osorno, Chile
- Education: Metropolitan University of Educational Sciences
- Height: 1.70 m (5 ft 7 in)

Sport
- Sport: Athletics
- Events: Shot put, Discus throw
- Coached by: Eduardo Sotomayor
Medal record
Women's athletics
Pan American Championships in Athletics
| Silver medal – second place | 2026 Medellín | Shot put |
Ibero-American Championships in Athletics
| Silver medal – second place | 2024 Cuiabá | Shot put |
| Bronze medal – third place | 2018 Trujillo | Shot put |
South American Championships in Athletics
| Gold medal – first place | 2023 São Paulo | Shot put |
| Gold medal – first place | 2025 Mar de Plata | Shot put |
| Bronze medal – third place | 2021 Guayaquil | Shot put |
South American Games
| Silver medal – second place | 2022 Asunción | Shot put |
Bolivarian Games
| Silver medal – second place | 2025 Ayacucho-Lima | Shot put |
| Bronze medal – third place | 2013 Trujillo | Shot put |
| Bronze medal – third place | 2022 Valledupar | Shot put |

Ivana Xennia Gallardo Cruchet (born 20 July 1993) is a Chilean athlete competing in the shot put and discus throw. She has won several medals on continental level in addition to representing her country at the 2022 World Indoor Championships.

== International competitions ==
| Year | Competition | Venue | Position | Event | Notes |
Representing Chile
| 2010 | South American Youth Championships | Santiago, Chile | 6th | Shot put | 11.74 m |
| 2010 | South American Youth Championships | Santiago, Chile | 3rd | Discus throw | 39.48 m |
| 2011 | South American Junior Championships | Medellín, Colombia | 4th | Shot put | 12.56 m |
| 2011 | South American Junior Championships | Medellín, Colombia | 7th | Discus throw | 42.14 m |
| 2012 | World Junior Championships | Barcelona, Spain | 21st (q) | Shot put | 13.55 m |
| 2012 | South American U23 Championships | São Paulo, Brazil | 5th | Shot put | 13.92 m |
| 2012 | South American U23 Championships | São Paulo, Brazil | 5th | Discus throw | 44.99 m |
| 2013 | Universiade | Kazan, Russia | 14th (q) | Shot put | 14.08 m |
| 2013 | Universiade | Kazan, Russia | 12th | Discus throw | 45.94 m |
| 2013 | Bolivarian Games | Trujillo, Peru | 3rd | Shot put | 16.01 m |
| 2013 | Bolivarian Games | Trujillo, Peru | 4th | Discus throw | 48.61 m |
| 2014 | South American Games | Santiago, Chile | 5th | Shot put | 14.78 m |
| 2014 | South American Games | Santiago, Chile | 7th | Discus throw | 50.86 m |
| 2014 | South American U23 Championships | Montevideo, Uruguay | 1st | Shot put | 16.20 m |
| 2014 | South American U23 Championships | Montevideo, Uruguay | 3rd | Discus throw | 51.75 m |
| 2015 | South American Championships | Lima, Peru | 5th | Shot put | 16.62 m |
| 2015 | South American Championships | Lima, Peru | 5th | Discus throw | 53.43 m |
| 2016 | Ibero-American Championships | Rio de Janeiro, Brazil | 6th | Shot put | 16.51 m |
| 2016 | Ibero-American Championships | Rio de Janeiro, Brazil | 5th | Discus throw | 51.01 m |
| 2017 | Universiade | Taipei, Taiwan | 18th (q) | Discus throw | 46.27 m |
| 2018 | South American Games | Cochabamba, Bolivia | 5th | Shot put | 16.45 m |
| 2018 | South American Games | Cochabamba, Bolivia | 4th | Discus throw | 47.47 m |
| 2018 | Ibero-American Championships | Trujillo, Peru | 3rd | Shot put | 15.05 m |
| 2018 | Ibero-American Championships | Trujillo, Peru | 4th | Discus throw | 50.67 m |
| 2019 | South American Championships | Lima, Peru | 4th | Shot put | 16.77 m |
| 2019 | South American Championships | Lima, Peru | 6th | Discus throw | 50.22 m |
| 2019 | Pan American Games | Lima, Peru | 11th | Shot put | 16.43 m |
| 2019 | Pan American Games | Lima, Peru | 11th | Discus throw | 50.85 m |
| 2020 | South American Indoor Championships | Cochabamba, Bolivia | 2nd | Shot put | 16.53 m |
| 2021 | South American Championships | Guayaquil, Ecuador | 3rd | Shot put | 16.94 m |
| 2022 | South American Indoor Championships | Cochabamba, Bolivia | 2nd | Shot put | 17.03 m |
| 2022 | World Indoor Championships | Belgrade, Serbia | 15th | Shot put | 16.08 m |
| 2022 | Ibero-American Championships | La Nucía, Spain | 4th | Shot put | 17.43 m |
| 2022 | Bolivarian Games | Valledupar, Colombia | 3rd | Shot put | 16.52 m |
| 2022 | World Championships | Eugene, United States | 27th (q) | Shot put | 16.20 m |
| 2022 | South American Games | Asunción, Paraguay | 2nd | Shot put | 16.73 m |
| 2023 | South American Championships | São Paulo, Brazil | 1st | Shot put | 17.39 m |
| 2023 | World Championships | Budapest, Hungary | 30th (q) | Shot put | 16.55 m |
| 2023 | Pan American Games | Santiago, Chile | 11th | Shot put | 15.30 m |
| 2024 | South American Indoor Championships | Cochabamba, Bolivia | 1st | Shot put | 17.74 m |
| 2024 | World Indoor Championships | Glasgow, United Kingdom | 17th | Shot put | 16.36 m |
| 2024 | Ibero-American Championships | Cuiabá, Brazil | 2nd | Shot put | 17.26 m |
| 2024 | Olympic Games | Paris, France | 18th (q) | Shot put | 17.47 m |
| 2025 | South American Indoor Championships | Cochabamba, Bolivia | 1st | Shot put | 17.63 m |
| 2025 | World Indoor Championships | Nanjing, China | 14th | Shot put | 17.08 m |
| 2025 | South American Championships | Mar del Plata, Argentina | 1st | Shot put | 17.55 m |
| 2025 | Bolivarian Games | Lima, Peru | 2nd | Shot put | 17.22 m |
| 2026 | South American Indoor Championships | Cochabamba, Bolivia | 1st | Shot put | 18.02 m |
| 2026 | World Indoor Championships | Toruń, Poland | 14th | Shot put | 17.04 m |
| 2026 | Ibero-American Championships | Lima, Peru | 5th | Shot put | 16.61 m |
| 2026 | Pan American Championships | Medellín, Colombia | 2nd | Shot put | 17.58 m |

== Personal bests ==
Outdoor

- Shot put – 17.91 (Santiago de Chile 2023)
- Discus throw – 55.26 (Santiago de Chile 2019)

Indoor

- Shot put – 18.02 (Cochabamba 2026)
