= 2018 IAAF World U20 Championships – Women's shot put =

Women's shot put at the 2018 World U20 Championships
- Venue: Ratina Stadium
- Dates: 11 July
- Competitors: 26 from 21 nations
- Winning distance: 17.09 m

Medalists
gold medal	Maddi Wesche	New Zealand
silver medal	Zhang Linru	China
bronze medal	Jorinde van Klinken	Netherlands

The women's shot put at the 2018 IAAF World U20 Championships was held at Ratina Stadium on 11 July.

== Records ==
Standing records prior to the 2018 IAAF World U20 Championships
World U20 Record	Astrid Kumbernuss (GDR)	20.54	Orimattila, Finland	1 July 1989
Championship Record	Cheng Xiaoyan (CHN)	18.76	Lisbon, Portugal	21 July 1994
World U20 Leading	Jorinde van Klinken (NED)	17.28	Emmeloord, Netherlands	17 June 2018

== Results ==
=== Qualification ===
The qualification round took place in two groups, with Group A starting at 10:15 and Group B starting at 11:30. Athletes attaining a mark of at least 15.50 metres( Q ) or at least the 12 best performers ( q ) qualified for the final.

Rank	Group	Name	Nationality	Round			Mark	Notes
Rank	Group	Name	Nationality	1	2	3	Mark	Notes
1	A	Alyssa Wilson	United States	15.42	17.02		17.02	Q
2	B	Jorinde van Klinken	Netherlands	x	16.01		16.01	Q
3	B	Maddi Wesche	New Zealand	15.83			15.83	Q
4	B	Lindsay Baker	United States	15.30	15.78		15.78	Q
5	A	Meike Strydom	South Africa	14.97	15.41	15.72	15.72	Q
6	A	Zhang Linru	China	15.19	x	15.62	15.62	Q
7	A	Selina Dantzler	Germany	15.39	14.34	14.94	15.39	q
8	B	Sydney Giampietro	Italy	14.35	x	15.20	15.20	q
9	B	Hanna Meinikmann	Germany	14.82	15.16	14.65	15.16	q
10	B	Tetyana Kravchenko	Ukraine	14.73	14.59	14.73	14.73	q
11	A	Ashley Bologna	France	14.60	14.45	14.64	14.64	q
12	B	Aysel Yılmaz	Turkey	14.56	x	13.80	14.56	q, PB
13	B	Trinity Tutti	Canada	14.52	14.54	14.39	14.54	
14	A	Erna Sóley Gunnarsdóttir	Iceland	14.32	13.70	14.24	14.32	
15	A	Grace Tennant	Canada	13.78	13.91	14.31	14.31	
16	A	Honoka Oyama	Japan	13.80	14.12	14.23	14.23	
17	B	Maria Magkoulia	Greece	13.72	13.98	14.17	14.17	
18	B	Ana Caroline Silva	Brazil	13.91	14.15	x	14.15	
19	A	Rosa Angelica Santana	Dominican Republic	13.42	14.13	13.98	14.13	
20	A	Helena Leveelahti	Finland	x	13.43	13.68	13.68	
21	B	Axelina Johansson	Sweden	x	13.58	x	13.58	
22	B	Thea Jensen	Denmark	x	13.46	13.40	13.46	
23	B	Urte Bacianskaite	Lithuania	13.40	13.07	13.26	13.40	
24	A	Hanna Khopyak	Ukraine	13.17	13.37	13.05	13.37	
	A	Ianna Roach	Trinidad and Tobago	x	x	x	NM	
	A	Jessica Schilder	Netherlands	x	x	x	NM	

=== Final ===
The final took place at 16:35.

Rank	Name	Nationality	Round						Mark	Notes
Rank	Name	Nationality	1	2	3	4	5	6	Mark	Notes
1st place, gold medalist(s)	Maddi Wesche	New Zealand	16.23	16.21	16.47	x	x	17.09	17.09	PB
2nd place, silver medalist(s)	Zhang Linru	China	15.63	16.65	16.34	16.35	17.05	x	17.05	
3rd place, bronze medalist(s)	Jorinde van Klinken	Netherlands	17.05	x	x	x	x	15.36	17.05	
4	Selina Dantzler	Germany	15.18	15.96	x	x	16.16	15.86	16.16	
5	Meike Strydom	South Africa	14.80	15.89	15.88	15.60	15.52	15.57	15.89	
6	Lindsay Baker	United States	15.33	15.46	15.67	x	x	x	15.67	
7	Hanna Meinikmann	Germany	15.11	x	15.13	x	15.41	15.08	15.41	
8	Sydney Giampietro	Italy	14.45	15.19	12.74	x	x	x	15.19	
9	Ashley Bologna	France	14.89	x	x				14.89	
10	Tetyana Kravchenko	Ukraine	14.60	x	x				14.60	
11	Aysel Yılmaz	Turkey	13.62	13.55	x				13.62	
	Alyssa Wilson	United States	x	x	x				NM	
