= Klaudia Kardasz =

Polish shot putter (born 1996)

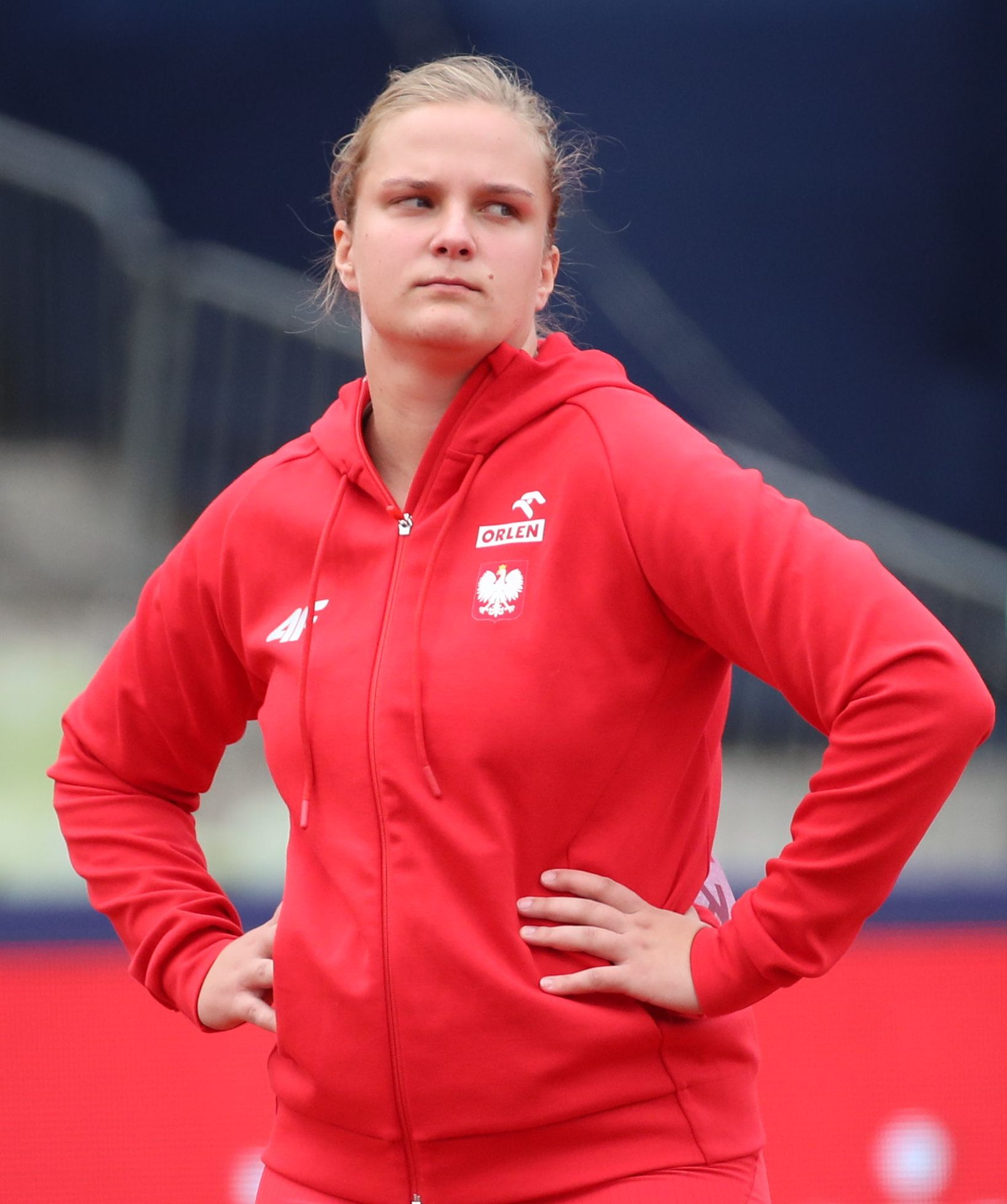
- Klaudia Kardasz (2022)

Personal information
- Born: 2 May 1996 (age 30) Białystok, Poland
- Education: Opole University of Technology
- Height: 1.79 m (5 ft 10 in)
- Weight: 77 kg (170 lb)

Sport
- Sport: Athletics
- Event: Shot put
- Club: Podlasie Białystok (2012–)
- Coached by: Przemysław Zabawski (2012–)
Medal record
Women's athletics
Representing Poland
European Team Championships
Bronze medal – third place	2021 Chorzów	Shot put
Summer Universiade
Silver medal – second place	2017 Taipei	Shot put
Bronze medal – third place	2019 Naples	Shot put

Klaudia Kardasz (born 2 May 1996) is a Polish athlete specialising in the shot put. She represented her country at the 2017 World Championships without qualifying for the final. In addition, she won a silver medal at the 2017 European U23 Championships.

Kardasz was born in Białystok. Her personal bests in the event are 18.48 metres outdoors (Berlin 2018) and 18.63 metres indoors (Glasgow 2019).

== International competitions ==
Year	Competition	Venue	Position	Event	Notes
Representing Poland
2013	World Youth Championships	Donetsk, Ukraine	5th	Shot put (3 kg)	16.98 m
2014	World Junior Championships	Eugene, United States	5th	Shot put	16.29 m
2015	European Junior Championships	Eskilstuna, Sweden	4th	Shot put	16.80 m
2017	European U23 Championships	Bydgoszcz, Poland	2nd	Shot put	17.67 m
2017	World Championships	London, United Kingdom	17th (q)	Shot put	17.52 m
2017	Universiade	Taipei, Taiwan	2nd	Shot put	17.90 m
2018	European Championships	Berlin, Germany	4th	Shot put	18.48 m
2019	European Indoor Championships	Glasgow, United Kingdom	5th	Shot put	18.23 m
2019	Universiade	Naples, Italy	3rd	Shot put	17.65 m
2019	World Championships	Doha, Qatar	15th (q)	Shot put	17.79 m
2021	European Indoor Championships	Toruń, Poland	12th (q)	Shot put	17.81 m
2021	Olympic Games	Tokyo, Japan	18th (q)	Shot put	17.76 m
2022	European Championships	Munich, Germany	14th (q)	Shot put	17.27 m
2023	World Championships	Budapest, Hungary	24th (q)	Shot put	17.27 m
2024	European Championships	Rome, Italy	10th	Shot put	17.66 m
2024	Olympic Games	Paris, France	19th (q)	Shot put	17.45 m
