= Divine Oladipo =

British athlete

Personal information
- Nationality: British (English)
- Born: 5 October 1998 (age 27) London, England

Sport
- Sport: Athletics
- Event(s): Discus & Shot put
- Club: Blackheath & Bromley AC; Vanderbilt
Medal record
Representing England
British Championships
Gold medal – first place	2024 Manchester	discus

Divine Oladipo (born 5 October 1998) is a United States–based English international athlete. She has represented England at the Commonwealth Games.

== Biography ==
Oladipo was educated at Bexley Grammar School. She competed foe the University of Connecticut, Ohio State University, and Vanderbilt University in the NCAA. She has won two bronze medals in the discus at the 2019 British Athletics Championships and the 2021 British Athletics Championships.

In 2022, she was selected for the women's shot put and the women's discus throw events at the 2022 Commonwealth Games in Birmingham.

Oladipo became a British discus throw champion in 2024, after winning the gold medal at the 2024 British Athletics Championships, held in Manchester, with a throw of 54.78 metres.
