= Sarah Mitton =

Canadian shot putter (born 1996)

- Mitton in 2026

Personal information
- Full name: Sarah Dawn Mitton
- Born: 20 June 1996 (age 30) Liverpool, Nova Scotia, Canada

Sport
- Sport: Athletics
- Event: Shot put
- Club: SISU Throws Club
- Coached by: Richard Parkinson

Achievements and titles
- Personal bests: Outdoor: 20.68 m (67 ft 10 in) (2024, NR); Indoor: 20.68 m (67 ft 10 in) (2025, NR)
Medal record
Women's athletics
Representing Canada
World Championships
Silver medal – second place	2023 Budapest	Shot put
World Indoor Championships
Gold medal – first place	2024 Glasgow	Shot put
Gold medal – first place	2025 Nanjing	Shot put
Silver medal – second place	2026 Toruń	Shot put
Diamond League
First place	2024	Shot put
Commonwealth Games
Gold medal – first place	2022 Birmingham	Shot put
Gold medal – first place	2026 Glasgow	Shot put
Pan American Games
Gold medal – first place	2023 Santiago	Shot put
NACAC Championships
Gold medal – first place	2022 Freeport	Shot put
Gold medal – first place	2025 Freeport	Shot put
Summer Universiade
Gold medal – first place	2019 Naples	Shot put

Sarah Dawn Mitton (born 20 June 1996) is a Canadian athlete specializing in the shot put. She is the 2023 World silver medallist and a two-time World Indoor champion (2024, 2025). The first Canadian woman to medal in the shot put at either World Athletics global championship, she is also a two-time Commonwealth Games gold medallist (2022, 2026), 2024 Diamond League winner, the 2023 Pan American champion, and 2019 Summer Universiade champion.

Mitton represented Canada at the 2020 and 2024 Summer Olympics, and holds both the indoor and outdoor national records in women's shot put.

== Career ==
=== Youth and university (2013–19) ===
Mitton was born in Liverpool, Nova Scotia and raised in Brooklyn. A student athlete, she began throwing while in junior high school, but also participated in other events, and made the Nova Scotian heptathlon team in 2013. After graduating from Liverpool High School in 2014, she was accepted to the University of Windsor on an athletic scholarship. International assignments eluded Mitton in the early years of her career, narrowly missing qualification for both the 2013 World Youth Championships and the 2014 World Junior Championships. In 2015 she won the Canadian junior title in shot put, which led to her first international assignment, the Pan American Junior Championships. Competing on home soil in Edmonton, she finished in fourth place, 0.77 metres behind bronze medalist Sophia Rivera.

Continuing to distinguish herself during her studies at Windsor, Mitton won the U Sports title and was named USports female field athlete of the year in 2018. The university also bestowed upon her the DeMarco Award, in recognition of students who combined "academic achievement with athletic prowess." Internationally, she competed at two Summer Universiades, finishing tenth in her first appearance in 2017 before taking gold in the shot put at the 2019 Summer Universiade in Naples. The latter was the first time she had competed in a shot put event with qualification and finals on the same day, something she simulated extensively in advance, which she later said gave her a considerable advantage over her competitors. Mitton described it as "overwhelming" that her first international medal was a gold medal.

After graduating with a Bachelor of Science degree, Mitton delayed plans to pursue further studies in marine biology to continue her athletics career, relocating to Toronto and for a time residing with fellow Canadian shot putter Brittany Crew. Following her Universiade victory, she made two other major international appearances in 2019, finishing sixth at the 2019 Pan American Games in Lima, and then making her World Championship debut at the 2019 edition in Doha. Mitton placed twenty-fourth in the qualification round, and did not advance to the event final. She would later attribute her performance to fatigue after a long season.

=== Tokyo Olympics and Commonwealth Games (2020–22) ===
Mitton and Crew opted to travel to New Zealand in February 2020 after a short off-season, aiming to gain experience in advance of the Olympics. Mitton obtained the necessary Olympic qualification mark at an event in Auckland, also setting a new personal best of 18.84 m, but said that the most gratifying element was competing against and beating legendary New Zealand shot putter Dame Valerie Adams. Returning to Canada in early March, she had intended only a short visit to Nova Scotia before turning to Toronto, but the onset of the COVID-19 pandemic meant she remained at home for several months. The pandemic significantly affected the international athletic calendar in 2020, including the delay by a full year of the 2020 Summer Olympics, but Mitton continued training and credited Crew as a valuable partner and rival in local events. She was eventually named to the Canadian team for the Tokyo Olympics, but was twenty-eighth in the qualification round and did not advance to the final. Her later recollection of the episode noted "throwing 16 metres at the Olympics was not fun. I don't want to be in that position ever again."

Continuing to make major strides in 2022, Mitton began by breaking the Canadian indoor record at an invitational challenge in New York with a throw of 19.16 m. She then was seventh in her World Indoor Championships debut. In May, she broke Crew's Canadian outdoor record with a throw of 19.58 m. This in turn earned Mitton her first ever Diamond League invitation, to attend the 2022 Bislett Games in Oslo, a longstanding goal. She placed sixth at the Bislett Games. She then broke the national record again in June with a 20.33 m throw at the Canadian Track and Field Championships. This stood as the best throw in the world to that point in the year. Her second Diamond League appearance, at the BAUHAUS-galan in Stockholm, saw her win the silver medal with a 19.90 m throw.

Mitton then competed in the shot put event of the 2022 World Athletics Championships in Eugene, placing second in qualification. In the final she finished fourth overall, with her sixth and final 19.77 m throw equaling the best of Dutch bronze medalist Jessica Schilder, but losing the tiebreaker based on their second-best throw. It was the highest placement ever for a Canadian woman in the shot put. She reasoned afterward that "Doha was 24th. Olympics I was 28th. So to come back and be fourth at a world championship, I think there's a lot more to come." A month later she was part of her first Commonwealth Games team, for the 2022 edition in Birmingham. In third place in the shot put final after five throws, with her final attempt she registered at 19.03 m, 0.05 ahead of defending champion Danniel Thomas-Dodd of Jamaica. Thomas-Dodd failed to regain her place with her own final attempt, earning Mitton the gold medal. She said afterward that "the goal from the beginning was to go out and win it, and we achieved it, though not the way we expected. The competition started out really rough and I started doubting myself mid-competition and pulled myself back... you just have to believe in yourself." At the 2022 NACAC Championships in Freeport, Mitton won the gold medal with a 20.15 metre throw, her second over twenty metres of the year. She then concluded the season in the Diamond League Final in Zürich, winning the silver medal.

=== World silver and World Indoor gold, Paris Olympics (2023–24) ===
Competing at the Can/Am Classic on January 13, 2023, Mitton raised her Canadian indoor record to 19.80 m. Mitton finished first overall on the 2023 World Athletics Indoor Tour, including a victory at the Villa de Madrid Indoor Meeting over reigning World champion Chase Ealey, finishing second at all other events. By the end of the indoor season, she had developed bone chips in her right elbow, which she contemplated surgical options for, but did not want to pursue in advance of the upcoming Summer Olympics. Instead, she sought to control it with time off and technique alterations.

Beginning the year's outdoor major competitions on the 2023 Diamond League circuit, she finished fifth in her initial outing at the Meeting International Mohammed VI d'Athlétisme de Rabat with a best throw of only 18.56 metres. Coach Richard Parkinson described it as "a bit of a humbling experience for her. She hasn't had many misfires the last couple of years." Mitton had an underwhelming result at the Meeting de Paris as well, before rebounding to win the Bislett Games in her second appearance in Oslo. This was her first Diamond League victory. After several consecutive throwing events under 19 metres she had reverted to her standard rotational technique. She claimed the Canadian national title again with a throw of 19.69 metres. At the 2023 World Athletics Championships in Budapest, Mitton qualified to the final in fifth place, and then placed second overall with her fifth throw of 20.08 metres, a season's best. Her silver medal, which she called "a fantastic upgrade from last year," was the first for a Canadian woman in the shot put, and one of three medals won by Canadian athletes in the throwing events in Budapest.

Mitton reached the Diamond League Final for the second consecutive season, taking her second silver medal after finishing behind Ealey. To conclude the year, she was part of the Canadian team for the 2023 Pan American Games in Santiago, where she won gold in the shot put.

Beginning the Olympic season, Mitton was named co-captain of the Canadian delegation to the 2024 World Athletics Indoor Championships alongside Alysha Newman. She won the gold medal with a distance of 20.22 m, a new national indoor record. Mitton described being a world champion as "the moment that cannot be taken away from you." Two months later, she set a new national outdoor record with a 20.68 metre throw at a May event in Fleetwood, Pennsylvania. Named to the Canadian team for the 2024 Summer Olympics in Paris, Mitton finished first in qualifying for the Olympic shot put, managing a 19.77 m distance on her first attempt. She was the first Canadian woman to reach the Olympic shot put final since 1964. As the defending World champion unexpectedly failed to qualify, Mitton was perceived as the gold medal favourite going into the final, but struggled and finished twelfth of the twelve competitors. Following the disappointment at the Olympics, Mitton resumed competing on the 2024 Diamond League circuit, earning medals that she would describe as "critical to my mental well-being. The best thing is to get back in the circle, do what you know and what you train for." Mitton concluded the season with victory at the Diamond League Final in Brussels, winning with a distance of 20.25 m. She was the first Canadian woman to win a Diamond League title in a field event, and the fourth Canadian to win in any discipline.

=== Second World Indoor title (2025–present) ===
Participating in the 2025 World Athletics Indoor Tour, Mitton won gold at the Indoor Meeting Karlsruhe on February 7, setting a new national indoor record of 20.68 m. This was the world's best indoor throw since 2013. At the 2025 World Athletics Indoor Championships in Nanjing, she successfully defended her gold medal from the prior year. Her throw of 20.48 m was the third-longest of her competitive career, and her second and fourth attempts (20.36 and 20.15 metres, respectively) would also have been sufficient to win. The event was the first time since 1991 that all three medalists had thrown a distance of over 20 metres. Mitton said "that makes it better — when you win when everyone's on top of their game."

Mitton initially appeared to have successfully defended her title at the 2025 Diamond League Final, but her erstwhile winning throw of 20.67 m was ruled invalid upon challenge by a competitor, and she dropped to third place based on her best remaining valid throw of 19.99 m. She finished the season at the 2025 World Athletics Championships in Tokyo. She led in the shot put event after the opening round of throws, and held the silver medal position through the bulk of the competition, but was bumped off the podium in the final round, finishing fourth.

Entering the 2026 World Athletics Indoor Championships in Toruń as the two-time and defending champion, Mitton won the silver medal, her best throw covering 19.78 m. Mitton was part of Canada's delegation to the 2026 Commonwealth Games in Glasgow, where she successfully defended her title in the shot put event with a winning throw of 19.88 m. She enjoyed success on the 2026 Diamond League circuit, including a victory at the Meeting de Paris, concluding with a second-place finish at the Diamond League Final in Brussels.

== International competitions ==
Year	Competition	Venue	Position	Event	Notes
Representing Canada
2015	Pan American Junior Championships	Edmonton, Canada	4th	Shot put	14.57 m
2017	Universiade	Taipei, Taiwan	10th	Shot put	16.32 m
2019	Universiade	Naples, Italy	1st	Shot put	18.31 m
2019	Pan American Games	Lima, Peru	6th	Shot put	17.62 m
2019	World Championships	Doha, Qatar	24th (q)	Shot put	17.24 m
2021	Olympic Games	Tokyo, Japan	28th (q)	Shot put	16.62 m
2022	World Indoor Championships	Belgrade, Serbia	7th	Shot put	19.02 m
2022	World Championships	Eugene, U.S.A.	4th	Shot put	19.77 m
2022	Commonwealth Games	Birmingham, United Kingdom	1st	Shot put	19.03 m
2022	NACAC Championships	Freeport, Bahamas	1st	Shot put	20.15 m
2023	World Championships	Budapest, Hungary	2nd	Shot put	20.08 m
2023	Pan American Games	Santiago, Chile	1st	Shot put	19.19 m
2024	World Indoor Championships	Glasgow, United Kingdom	1st	Shot put	20.22 m
2024	Olympic Games	Paris, France	12th	Shot put	17.48 m
2025	World Indoor Championships	Nanjing, China	1st	Shot put	20.48 m
2025	NACAC Championships	Freeport, Bahamas	1st	Shot put	20.02 m
2025	World Championships	Tokyo, Japan	4th	Shot put	19.81 m
2026	World Indoor Championships	Toruń, Poland	2nd	Shot put	19.78 m
2026	Commonwealth Games	Glasgow, United Kingdom	1st	Shot put	19.88 m
