= 2016 IAAF World U20 Championships – Women's shot put =

The women's shot put event at the 2016 IAAF World U20 Championships was held at Zdzisław Krzyszkowiak Stadium on 20 July.

== Medalists ==
Gold	Alina Kenzel; Germany
Silver	Song Jiayuan; China
Bronze	Alyssa Wilson; United States

== Records ==
Standing records prior to the 2016 IAAF World U20 Championships in Athletics
World Junior Record	Astrid Kumbernuss (GDR)	20.54	Orimattila, Finland	1 July 1989
Championship Record	Cheng Xiaoyan (CHN)	18.76	Lisbon, Portugal	21 July 1994
World Junior Leading	Alina Kenzel (GER)	17.48	Mannheim, Germany	25 June 2016

== Results ==
=== Qualification ===
Qualification: 15.50 (Q) or at least 12 best performers (q) qualified for the final.

Rank	Group	Name	Nationality	#1	#2	#3	Result	Note
1	B	Song Jiayuan	China	16.17			16.17	Q
2	B	Alina Kenzel	Germany	16.04			16.04	Q
3	A	Sarah Schmidt	Germany	15.18	15.69		15.69	Q
4	A	Anna Niedbała	Poland	15.67			15.67	Q
5	B	Elena Bruckner	United States	15.50			15.50	Q
6	B	Maja Ślepowrońska	Poland	15.37	15.26	x	15.37	q
7	A	Alyssa Wilson	United States	14.44	x	15.37	15.37	q
8	A	Michaela Walsh	Ireland	15.31	14.43	14.79	15.31	q, NU20R
9	A	Gavriella Fella	Cyprus	13.80	15.18	15.26	15.26	q
10	A	Chen Xiarong	China	15.22	x	15.04	15.22	q
11	A	María Fernanda Orozco	Mexico	15.08	14.89	14.87	15.08	q
12	A	Jessica Schilder	Netherlands	14.28	14.65	14.01	14.65	q
13	B	Nanaka Kori	Japan	13.70	14.63	14.37	14.63	
14	A	Jeong Yu-sun	South Korea	14.01	14.33	14.34	14.34	
15	B	Janell Fullerton	Jamaica	14.33	x	x	14.33	
16	B	Jorinde van Klinken	Netherlands	14.31	x	13.82	14.31	
17	B	Jessica Molina	Ecuador	13.14	14.02	x	14.02	
18	B	Marija Tolj	Croatia	13.87	14.00	13.58	14.00	NU20R
19	A	Eveliina Rouvali	Finland	13.74	13.95	x	13.95	
20	A	Maddison-Lee Wesche	New Zealand	13.79	x	x	13.79	
21	B	Chelsea James	Trinidad and Tobago	13.31	13.52	13.72	13.72	
22	A	Patrícia Slošárová	Slovakia	13.30	13.65	x	13.65	
23	B	Lada Cermanová	Czech Republic	13.36	13.61	12.95	13.61	
24	B	Martina Carnevale	Italy	12.05	12.58	13.16	13.16	
	B	Eucharia Ogbukwo	Nigeria				DNS	

=== Final ===
Rank	Name	Nationality	#1	#2	#3	#4	Result	Note
1st place, gold medalist(s)	Alina Kenzel	Germany	16.91	16.66	17.58	x	17.58	
2nd place, silver medalist(s)	Song Jiayuan	China	15.77	15.93	16.36	16.14	16.36	PB
3rd place, bronze medalist(s)	Alyssa Wilson	United States	x	16.33	x	x	16.33	
4	Sarah Schmidt	Germany	16.18	15.88	x	15.32	16.18	
5	María Fernanda Orozco	Mexico	15.76	15.58	15.91	15.94	15.94	
6	Maja Ślepowrońska	Poland	15.10	15.75	15.44	x	15.75	PB
7	Elena Bruckner	United States	x	15.73	x		15.73	
8	Anna Niedbała	Poland	x	15.58	x		15.58	
9	Chen Xiarong	China	15.11	x	x		15.11	
10	Gavriella Fella	Cyprus	15.10	14.75	14.90		15.10	
11	Michaela Walsh	Ireland	14.01	14.30	14.73		14.73	
12	Jessica Schilder	Netherlands	14.34	14.15	13.82		14.34	
