= 2019 World Athletics Championships – Women's shot put =

Women's shot put at the 2019 World Championships
- Venue: Khalifa International Stadium
- Dates: 2 October (qualification); 3 October (final)
- Competitors: 27 from 18 nations
- Winning distance: 19.55

Medalists
gold medal	Gong Lijiao	China
silver medal	Danniel Thomas-Dodd	Jamaica
bronze medal	Christina Schwanitz	Germany

The women's shot put at the 2019 World Athletics Championships was held at the Khalifa International Stadium in Doha, Qatar, from 2 to 3 October 2019.

== Summary ==
As the competition was just getting started, defending champion Gong Lijiao put herself into the lead with the only 19 meter throw of the first round 19.07m. Chase Ealey dropped an 18.70m that held up in second until Danniel Thomas-Dodd almost got 19 with her 18.97m. In the second round, Gong improved to 19.42m and Thomas-Dodd also improved to 19.07, 2013 champion Christina Schwanitz took over third with an 18.87m. In the third round, Aliona Dubitskaya tickled the leaders with an 18.86m but that was going to be her best of the day. Re-ordered in the fourth round, Magdalyn Ewen moved into third with an 18.91m, then Gong tossed the winner 19.55 m (64 ft 1 1/2 in). Ewen improved 2 cm in the fifth round, but then Schwanitz stepped into the ring to let out 19.17m to jump into second place. In the final round, Thomas-Dodd reclaimed the silver with 19.47m.

== Records ==
Before the competition records were as follows:

Record	Perf.	Athlete	Nat.	Date	Location
World	22.63	Natalya Lisovskaya	URS	7 Jun 1987	Moscow, Russia
Championship	21.24	Natalya Lisovskaya	URS	5 Sep 1987	Rome, Italy
Championship	21.24	Valerie Adams	NZL	29 Aug 2011	Daegu, South Korea
World leading	20.31	Gong Lijiao	CHN	29 Aug 2019	Zürich, Switzerland
African	18.43	Vivian Chukwuemeka	NGA	19 Apr 2003	Walnut, United States
Asian	21.76	Li Meisu	CHN	23 Apr 1988	Shijiazhuang, China
NACAC	20.96	Belsy Laza	CUB	2 May 1992	Mexico City, Mexico
European	22.63	Natalya Lisovskaya	URS	7 Jun 1987	Moscow, Russia
Oceanian	21.24	Valerie Adams	NZL	29 Aug 2011	Daegu, South Korea

== Schedule ==
The event schedule, in local time (UTC+3), is as follows:

Date	Time	Round
2 October	16:45	Qualification
3 October	22:35	Final

== Results ==
=== Qualification ===
Qualification: Qualifying Performance 18.40 (Q) or at least 12 best performers (q) advance to the final.

Rank	Group	Name	Nationality	Round			Mark	Notes
Rank	Group	Name	Nationality	1	2	3	Mark	Notes
1	A	Danniel Thomas-Dodd	Jamaica	17.60	18.06	19.32	19.32	Q
2	B	Magdalyn Ewen	United States	19.21			19.21	Q
3	B	Gong Lijiao	China	18.96			18.96	Q
4	A	Michelle Carter	United States	18.85			18.85	Q, SB
5	B	Dimitriana Surdu	Moldova	18.71			18.71	Q, SB
6	A	Sophie McKinna	Great Britain & N.I.	17.74	18.05	18.61	18.61	Q, PB
7	B	Christina Schwanitz	Germany	18.52			18.52	Q
8	A	Aliona Dubitskaya	Belarus	18.51			18.51	Q
9	B	Anita Márton	Hungary	18.29	18.44		18.44	Q
10	A	Chase Ealey	United States	17.90	x	18.35	18.35	q
11	A	Brittany Crew	Canada	17.35	18.30	18.24	18.30	q
12	A	Paulina Guba	Poland	17.36	18.04	x	18.04	q
13	A	Sara Gambetta	Germany	17.59	18.01	17.41	18.01	
14	B	Fanny Roos	Sweden	x	18.01	17.39	18.01	
15	B	Klaudia Kardasz	Poland	x	16.86	17.79	17.79	
16	B	Emel Dereli	Turkey	16.51	x	17.71	17.71	
17	A	Zhang Linru	China	x	17.06	17.65	17.65	
18	B	Alena Pasechnik	Belarus	17.55	x	17.42	17.55	
19	A	Portious Warren	Trinidad and Tobago	17.43	17.46	x	17.46	
20	B	Alina Kenzel	Germany	16.58	17.46	17.42	17.46	
21	A	Geisa Arcanjo	Brazil	17.30	x	17.45	17.45	
22	B	Noora Salem Jasim	Bahrain	17.36	x	16.83	17.36	
23	A	Song Jiayuan	China	15.14	17.10	17.24	17.24	
24	B	Sarah Mitton	Canada	16.27	x	17.24	17.24	
25	B	Maddi Wesche	New Zealand	16.55	17.22	x	17.22	
26	A	Oyesade Olatoye	Nigeria	16.97	x	x	16.97	
27	A	Ahymará Espinoza	Venezuela	x	16.89	x	16.89	

=== Final ===
The final was started on 3 October at 22:35.

Rank	Name	Nationality	Round						Mark	Notes
Rank	Name	Nationality	1	2	3	4	5	6	Mark	Notes
1st place, gold medalist(s)	Gong Lijiao	China	19.07	19.42	19.21	19.55	x	x	19.55	
2nd place, silver medalist(s)	Danniel Thomas-Dodd	Jamaica	18.97	19.02	19.36	19.05	x	19.47	19.47	
3rd place, bronze medalist(s)	Christina Schwanitz	Germany	18.61	18.87	18.68	18.67	19.17	18.44	19.17	
4	Magdalyn Ewen	United States	18.04	18.48	18.79	18.91	18.93	x	18.93	
5	Anita Márton	Hungary	18.75	18.41	18.37	18.28	18.18	18.86	18.86	
6	Aliona Dubitskaya	Belarus	18.66	18.48	18.86	18.36	18.58	18.55	18.86	
7	Chase Ealey	United States	18.70	18.25	x	x	18.82	18.61	18.82	
8	Brittany Crew	Canada	18.46	18.18	x	18.55	18.40	17.46	18.55	
9	Michelle Carter	United States	18.32	18.31	18.41				18.41	
10	Paulina Guba	Poland	18.02	17.97	x				18.02	
11	Sophie McKinna	Great Britain & N.I.	17.99	17.85	17.68				17.99	
12	Dimitriana Surdu	Moldova	17.64	17.45	x				17.64	
