= Portious Warren =

Trinidad and Tobago athlete

Personal information
- Born: 2 March 1996 (age 30)
- Education: University of Alabama

Sport
- Sport: Athletics
- Events: Shot put, discus throw

Portious Warren (born 2 March 1996) is a Trinidad and Tobago athlete competing in the shot put and discus throw. She won a silver medal in the former at the 2019 Summer Universiade.

White was an All-American shot putter for the Alabama Crimson Tide track and field team, finishing runner-up in the shot put at the 2019 NCAA Division I Outdoor Track and Field Championships.

== International competitions ==
Year	Competition	Venue	Position	Event	Notes
Representing Trinidad and Tobago
2013	World Youth Championships	Donetsk, Ukraine	24th (q)	Shot put (3 kg)	14.90 m
2014	CARIFTA Games (U20)	Fort-de-France, Martinique	3rd	Shot put	12.70 m
2014	Central American and Caribbean; Junior Championships (U20)	Morelia, Mexico	1st	Shot put	14.47 m
2014	World Junior Championships	Eugene, United States	20th (q)	Shot put	14.22 m
2015	CARIFTA Games (U20)	Basseterre, Saint Kitts and Nevis	1st	Shot put	15.22 m
2015	Pan American Junior Championships	Edmonton, Canada	2nd	Shot put	15.57 m
2016	NACAC U23 Championships	San Salvador, El Salvador	6th	Shot put	15.31 m
2017	Universiade	Taipei, Taiwan	12th	Shot put	15.03 m
2018	Central American and Caribbean Games	Barranquilla, Colombia	6th	Shot put	16.22 m
2018	Central American and Caribbean Games	Barranquilla, Colombia	7th	Discus throw	51.71 m
2019	Universiade	Naples, Italy	2nd	Shot put	17.82 m
2019	Universiade	Naples, Italy	8th (q)	Discus throw	52.94 m^{1}
2019	Pan American Games	Lima, Peru	9th	Shot put	16.55 m
2019	Pan American Games	Lima, Peru	–	Discus throw	NM
2019	World Championships	Doha, Qatar	19th (q)	Shot put	17.46 m
2021	Olympic Games	Tokyo, Japan	11th	Shot put	18.32 m
2022	World Championships	Eugene, United States	25th (q)	Shot put	16.65 m
2024	Olympic Games	Paris, France	22nd (q)	Shot put	17.22 m

^{1}No mark in the final

== Personal bests ==
Outdoors

- Shot put – 18.75 (Tokyo 2021)
- Discus throw – 54.62 (Baton Rouge 2019)
- Hammer throw – 48.39 (Mesa 2017)
- Javelin throw – 38.79 (Mesa 2017)
- Weight throw – 20.33 (Fayetteville 2019)

Indoors

- Shot put – 17.41 (Birmingham, AL 2019)
