= Maddi Wesche =

New Zealand shot putter (born 1999)

Personal information
- Full name: Maddison-Lee Wesche
- Born: 13 June 1999 (age 27) West Auckland, New Zealand
- Education: Massey University

Sport
- Country: New Zealand
- Sport: Athletics
- Event: Shot put
- Coached by: Walter Gill; Mike Schofield

Achievements and titles
- National finals: Shot put champion (2017, 2022, 2023, 2024, 2025, 2026)
- Personal bests: Shot put: 20.06 m (Tokyo, 2025)
Medal record
Women's track and field
Representing New Zealand
Olympic Games
Silver medal – second place	2024 Paris	Shot put
World Championships
Bronze medal – third place	2025 Tokyo	Shot put
Commonwealth Games
Bronze medal – third place	2022 Birmingham	Shot put
Oceania Championships
Gold medal – first place	2017 Suva	Shot put
Gold medal – first place	2019 Townsville	Shot put
World U20 Championships
Gold medal – first place	2018 Tampere	Shot put

Maddison-Lee Wesche (born 13 June 1999) is a New Zealand athlete specialising in the shot put. She won the silver medal at the 2024 Summer Olympics. In 2018, she also won a gold medal at the World U20 Championships in Tampere.

== Early life and education ==
Wesche was born in West Auckland, New Zealand, to parents Renee and Hans. She is of Samoan descent. The middle of three sisters, Wesche comes from a sporting family: her father played basketball, while her mother was a hockey player. She initially played netball before switching to sprinting and, eventually, shot put.

Wesche was educated at Lynfield College in Blockhouse Bay, Auckland, from 2013 to 2017. She completed studies towards the Bachelor of Arts in psychology at Massey University.

== Career ==
Wesche set a personal best of 18.65 m in the qualifying round of shot put at the 2020 Summer Olympics, improving to 18.98 m in the final and finishing in sixth place.

Wesche took the bronze medal at the 2025 World Athletics Championships in Tokyo, with a put of 20.06 m, equalling her personal best.

== International competitions ==
Year	Competition	Venue	Position	Event	Notes
Representing New Zealand
2015	World Youth Championships	Cali, Colombia	17th (q)	Shot put (3 kg)	15.23 m
2016	World U20 Championships	Bydgoszcz, Poland	20th (q)	Shot put	13.79 m
2017	Oceania Championships	Suva, Fiji	1st	Shot put	15.27 m
2018	World U20 Championships	Tampere, Finland	1st	Shot put	17.09 m
2019	Oceania Championships	Townsville, Australia	1st	Shot put	18.04 m
2019	Universiade	Naples, Italy	6th	Shot put	17.22 m
2019	World Championships	Doha, Qatar	25th (q)	Shot put	17.22 m
2021	Olympic Games	Tokyo, Japan	6th	Shot put	18.98 m
2022	World Championships	Eugene, United States	7th	Shot put	19.50 m
2022	Commonwealth Games	Birmingham, United Kingdom	3rd	Shot put	19.03 m
2023	World Championships	Budapest, Hungary	7th	Shot put	19.51 m
2024	World Indoor Championships	Glasgow, United Kingdom	4th	Shot put	19.62 m
2024	Olympic Games	Paris, France	2nd	Shot put	19.86 m
2025	World Indoor Championships	Nanjing, China	15th	Shot put	16.52 m
2025	World Championships	Tokyo, Japan	3rd	Shot put	20.06 m

Awards
Preceded by Ellesse Andrews	Halberg Awards – Emerging Talent Award; 2018	Succeeded by Alice Robinson
