= Athletics at the 2019 Summer Universiade – Women's shot put =

The women's shot put event at the 2019 Summer Universiade was held on 11 July at the Stadio San Paolo in Naples.

== Medalists ==
| Gold | Silver | Bronze |
|---|---|---|
| Sarah Mitton; Canada | Portious Warren; Trinidad and Tobago | Klaudia Kardasz; Poland |

== Results ==
=== Qualification ===
Qualification: 18.30 m (Q) or at least 12 best (q) qualified for the final.

| Rank | Group | Name | Nationality | #1 | #2 | #3 | Result | Notes |
|---|---|---|---|---|---|---|---|---|
| 1 | A | Brittany Crew | Canada | 17.54 | 16.91 | – | 17.54 | q |
| 2 | B | Portious Warren | Trinidad and Tobago | 17.05 | 17.12 | 17.31 | 17.31 | q |
| 3 | A | Dimitriana Surdu | Moldova | 16.76 | 16.66 | 17.26 | 17.26 | q |
| 4 | A | Alena Pasechnik | Belarus | 16.11 | 16.08 | 17.14 | 17.14 | q |
| 5 | B | Sarah Mitton | Canada | 14.24 | 17.08 | 16.95 | 17.08 | q |
| 6 | A | Klaudia Kardasz | Poland | 16.64 | 16.94 | x | 16.94 | q |
| 7 | B | Song Jiayuan | China | 16.73 | 16.11 | 16.60 | 16.73 | q |
| 8 | B | Sarah Schmidt | Germany | 15.95 | 16.20 | x | 16.20 | q |
| 9 | B | Maddison-Lee Wesche | New Zealand | x | x | 16.19 | 16.19 | q |
| 10 | B | Senja Mäkitörmä | Finland | 15.94 | 15.50 | 15.49 | 15.94 | q, SB |
| 11 | B | Ieva Zarankaitė | Lithuania | 15.71 | 15.21 | 14.58 | 15.71 | q |
| 12 | B | Sara Lennman | Sweden | 15.36 | 15.70 | 15.66 | 15.70 | q |
| 13 | B | Nanaka Kori | Japan | 15.44 | 15.32 | x | 15.44 | |
| 14 | A | María Fernanda Orozco | Mexico | 15.37 | x | x | 15.37 | |
| 15 | A | Cherisse Murray | Trinidad and Tobago | 14.03 | x | 14.96 | 14.96 | |
| 16 | A | Iara Capurro | Argentina | x | 13.60 | 13.99 | 13.99 | PB |
| 17 | A | Victoria Owers | New Zealand | 13.81 | x | x | 13.81 | |
| 18 | B | Marie Aagaard Nielsen | Denmark | 13.43 | 13.35 | 13.38 | 13.43 | |
| 19 | A | Mercy Laker | Uganda | x | 10.39 | x | 10.39 | |
| 20 | B | Shameemah Rishard | Sri Lanka | 9.92 | 10.04 | 10.15 | 10.15 | |
| | A | Amira Khaled | Egypt | | | | DNS | |
| | A | Gabriella Jacobs | United States | | | | DNS | |

=== Final ===
| Rank | Name | Nationality | #1 | #2 | #3 | #4 | #5 | #6 | Result | Notes |
|---|---|---|---|---|---|---|---|---|---|---|
| 1st place, gold medalist(s) | Sarah Mitton | Canada | 17.65 | 17.80 | 18.31 | x | 17.33 | x | 18.31 | |
| 2nd place, silver medalist(s) | Portious Warren | Trinidad and Tobago | 17.53 | 17.82 | 17.73 | x | 17.23 | 16.99 | 17.82 | |
| 3rd place, bronze medalist(s) | Klaudia Kardasz | Poland | 17.02 | 17.25 | 16.79 | 17.65 | x | x | 17.65 | |
| 4 | Alena Pasechnik | Belarus | x | 17.00 | 17.29 | 17.19 | 17.23 | 17.52 | 17.52 | |
| 5 | Dimitriana Surdu | Moldova | x | 16.42 | 17.25 | x | 16.64 | x | 17.25 | |
| 6 | Maddison-Lee Wesche | New Zealand | 16.19 | 14.53 | 17.02 | 17.22 | 16.94 | 16.99 | 17.22 | |
| 7 | Brittany Crew | Canada | 16.85 | x | 16.72 | 17.07 | x | x | 17.07 | |
| 8 | Song Jiayuan | China | 16.92 | 16.67 | 16.82 | x | 16.86 | 16.81 | 16.92 | |
| 9 | Sarah Schmidt | Germany | 16.24 | 16.14 | 16.33 | | | | 16.33 | |
| 10 | Sara Lennman | Sweden | 15.61 | x | 15.94 | | | | 15.94 | |
| 11 | Senja Mäkitörmä | Finland | 15.29 | 15.67 | 15.34 | | | | 15.67 | |
| 12 | Ieva Zarankaitė | Lithuania | 14.42 | x | 14.51 | | | | 14.51 | |
