= 2017 European Athletics U23 Championships – Women's shot put =

The women's shot put event at the 2017 European Athletics U23 Championships was held in Bydgoszcz, Poland, at Zdzisław Krzyszkowiak Stadium on 14 and 15 July.

== Medalists ==
Gold	Fanny Roos; Sweden
Silver	Klaudia Kardasz; Poland
Bronze	Alina Kenzel; Germany

== Results ==
=== Qualification ===
15 July

Qualification rule: 14.90 (Q) or the 12 best results (q) qualified for the final.

Rank	Group	Name	Nationality	#1	#2	#3	Results	Notes
1	A	Emel Dereli	Turkey	17.08			17.08	Q
2	A	Klaudia Kardasz	Poland	16.57			16.57	Q
3	B	Fanny Roos	Sweden	16.38			16.38	Q
4	B	Claudine Vita	Germany	16.36			16.36	Q
5	B	Alena Pasechnik	Belarus	x	16.08		16.08	Q
6	B	Stamatia Scarvelis	Greece	15.79			15.79	Q
7	A	Kätlin Piirimäe	Estonia	15.60			15.60	Q
8	A	Sara Lennman	Sweden	15.47			15.47	Q, SB
9	B	Lenuta Burueana	Romania	14.87	x	15.46	15.46	Q
10	B	Alina Kenzel	Germany	15.45			15.45	Q
11	B	Daisy Osakue	Italy	14.31	14.78	15.34	15.34	Q
12	A	Sarah Schmidt	Germany	15.23			15.23	Q
13	A	Claudia Bertoletti	Italy	x	x	14.95	14.95	Q
14	B	Sare Bostancı	Turkey	13.82	13.75	14.67	14.67	
15	A	Eveliina Rouvali	Finland	14.18	14.43	14.19	14.43	SB
16	A	Sopo Shatirishvili	Georgia	13.44	x	13.75	13.75	
	B	Stéphanie Krumlovsky	Luxembourg	x	x	x	NM	

=== Final ===
15 July

Rank	Name	Nationality	#1	#2	#3	#4	#5	#6	Result	Notes
1st place, gold medalist(s)	Fanny Roos	Sweden	17.71	17.79	17.83	17.80	17.57	18.14	18.14	
2nd place, silver medalist(s)	Klaudia Kardasz	Poland	17.34	17.20	17.45	16.99	17.43	17.67	17.67	
3rd place, bronze medalist(s)	Alina Kenzel	Germany	16.06	17.46	x	17.10	17.20	17.41	17.46	
4	Emel Dereli	Turkey	17.34	17.13	17.33	17.45	17.20	17.18	17.45	
5	Claudine Vita	Germany	16.56	17.11	x	17.20	17.32	17.33	17.33	
6	Alena Pasechnik	Belarus	16.00	16.01	16.43	16.44	16.56	x	16.56	
7	Sarah Schmidt	Germany	16.17	x	x	16.22	16.07	x	16.22	
8	Kätlin Piirimäe	Estonia	16.06	x	x	x	x	16.07	16.07	SB
9	Stamatia Scarvelis	Greece	15.94	x	x				15.94	
10	Sara Lennman	Sweden	15.67	x	15.92				15.92	PB
11	Lenuta Burueana	Romania	x	15.08	15.35				15.35	
12	Claudia Bertoletti	Italy	x	14.87	x				14.87	
13	Daisy Osakue	Italy	14.64	x	x				14.64	
