= Athletics at the 2026 Commonwealth Games – Women's shot put =

Women's shot put at the 2026 Commonwealth Games
- Venue: Scotstoun Stadium, Glasgow
- Dates: 28 July (qualification); 29 July (final)
- Winning distance: 19.88 m

Medalists
gold medal	Sarah Mitton	Canada
silver medal	Jessica Oji	Nigeria
bronze medal	Lloydricia Cameron	Jamaica

The women's shot put at the 2026 Commonwealth Games, as part of the athletics programme, took place at Scotstoun Stadium on 28 and 29 July 2026. The event was a straight final.

== Records ==
Prior to this competition, the existing world, Commonwealth and Commonwealth Games records were as follows:

Women's Shot put
World record	22.63 m	Natalya Lisovskaya (URS)	7 Jun 1987	Moscow, Soviet Union
Commonwealth record	21.24 m	Valerie Adams (NZL)	29 Aug 2011	Daegu, South Korea
Games record	20.47 m	Valerie Adams (NZL)	9 October 2010	Delhi, India

== Schedule ==
The schedule was as follows:

Date	Time	Round
29 July 2026	18:30	Final

All times are British Summer Time (UTC+1)

== Results ==
=== Final ===
The final was scheduled for the evening of 29 July.

Rank	Name	1	2	3	4	5	6	Result	Notes
1st place, gold medalist(s)	Sarah Mitton (CAN)	18.50	18.91	19.15	18.95	19.88	19.47	19.88	
2nd place, silver medalist(s)	Jessica Oji (NGR)	17.33	17.70	17.87	x	17.69	17.21	17.87	
3rd place, bronze medalist(s)	Lloydricia Cameron (JAM)	17.40	x	x	17.19	17.37	17.87	17.87	
4	Manpreet Kaur (IND)	15.92	16.66	17.00	16.89	17.49	x	17.49	
5	Adele Nicoll (WAL)	x	16.33	15.26	16.00	15.84	x	16.33	
6	Marley Raikiwasa (AUS)	15.61	16.13	x	15.68	x	x	16.13	
7	Belinda Oburu (KEN)	15.57	15.46	16.09	15.83	x	14.34	16.09	
8	Ata Maama Tu'utafaiva (TGA)	15.07	14.91	15.58	14.97	15.32	15.35	15.58	
9	Carine Bachetta-Mekam (GAB)	14.88	14.82	x				14.88	
10	Ashley Erasmus (RSA)	14.83	x	x				14.83	
11	Nu'u Tuilefano (SAM)	13.70	14.45	14.34				14.45	SB
