= Alena Pasechnik =

Belarusian shot putter

Personal information
- Full name: Alena Vasileŭna Pasechnik
- Born: 17 April 1995 (age 31)

Sport
- Sport: Athletics
- Event: Shot put
- Club: RCFBS

Alena Vasileŭna Pasechnik (Belarusian: Алена Васілеўна Пасечнік; born 17 April 1995) is a Belarusian athlete specialising in the shot put. She represented her country at the 2019 World Championships in Doha without reaching the final.

Her personal bests in the event are 18.01 metres outdoors (Minsk 2019) and 17.44 metres indoors (Mogilyov 2018).

== International competitions ==
Year	Competition	Venue	Position	Event	Notes
Representing Belarus
2014	World Junior Championships	Eugene, United States	17th (q)	Shot put	14.48 m
2016	European Throwing Cup (U23)	Arad, Romania	3rd	Shot put	15.88 m
2017	European Throwing Cup (U23)	Las Palmas, Spain	2nd	Shot put	16.33 m
2017	European U23 Championships	Bydgoszcz, Poland	6th	Shot put	16.56 m
2019	Universiade	Naples, Italy	4th	Shot put	17.52 m
2019	World Championships	Doha, Qatar	18th (q)	Shot put	17.55 m
