= Danniel Thomas-Dodd =

Jamaican shot putter (born 1992)

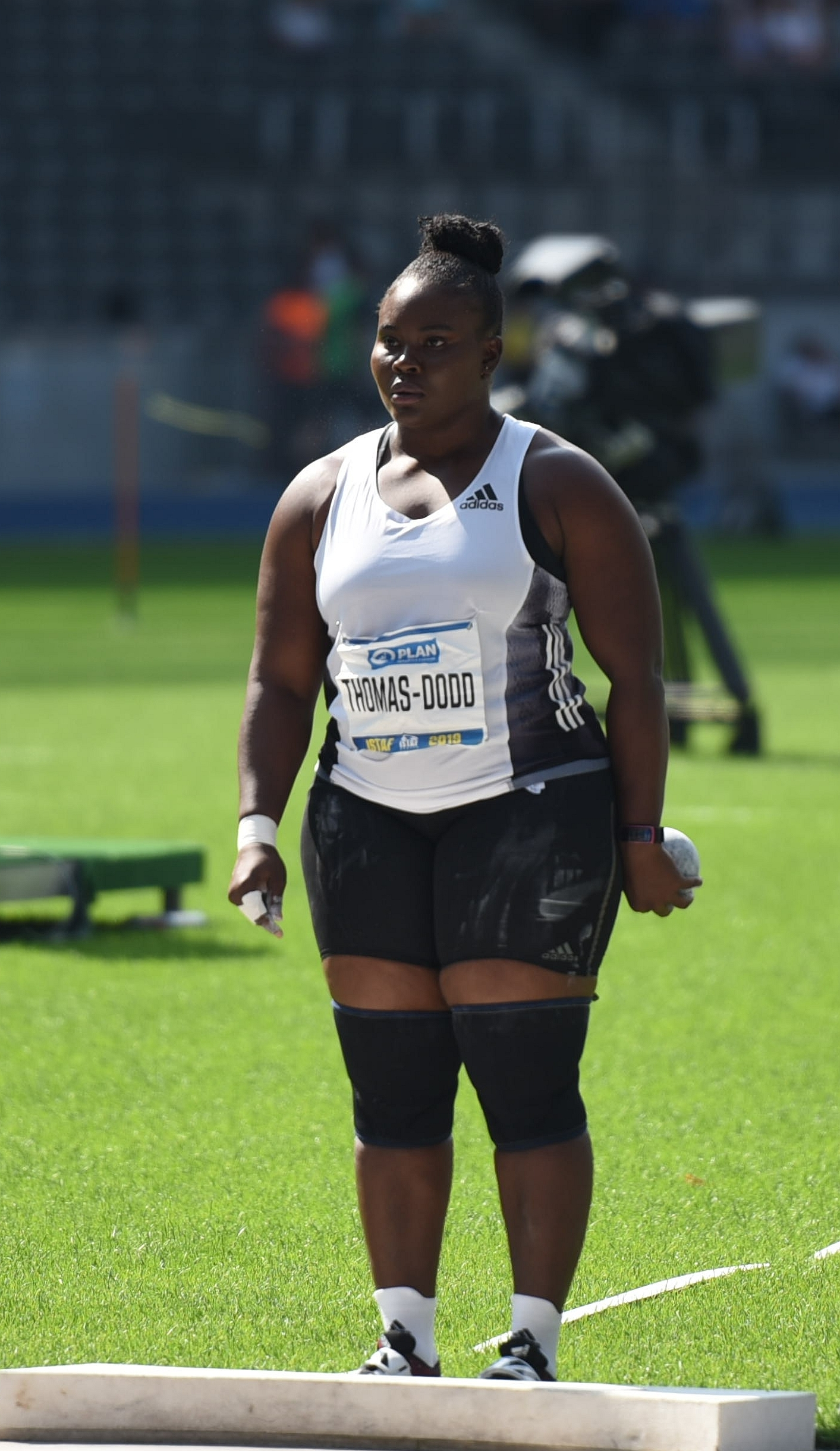
- Danniel Thomas-Dodd, 2019

Personal information
- Born: 11 November 1992 (age 33) Westmoreland, Jamaica
- Height: 1.66 m (5 ft 5 in)
- Weight: 89 kg (196 lb)

Sport
- Country: Jamaica
- Sport: Track and field
- Events: Shot put, discus throw
- College team: Kent State Golden Flashes
Medal record
Women's track and field
Representing Jamaica
World Championships
Silver medal – second place	2019 Doha	Shot put
World Indoor Championships
Silver medal – second place	2018 Birmingham	Shot put
Commonwealth Games
Gold medal – first place	2018 Gold Coast	Shot put
Silver medal – second place	2022 Birmingham	Shot put
Pan American Games
Gold medal – first place	2019 Lima	Shot put

Danniel Thomas-Dodd, née Danniel Thomas, (11 November 1992) is a Jamaican athlete whose specialty is the shot put. She finished 4th in the shot put finals at London's 2017 World Championships in Athletics and the following year she won silver at the Indoor World Championships. In addition, she finished fifth at the 2015 Pan American Games.

Thomas-Dodd was an NCAA champion thrower for the Kent State Golden Flashes track and field team, winning the shot put at the 2017 NCAA Division I Outdoor Track and Field Championships.

She has a personal best and the Jamaican national record in the shot put of 19.77 metres outdoors, set in 2023. Indoors, she registered a 19.22 metre throw at Arena Birmingham, Birmingham, England. She also has a personal discus best of 59.38 metres set in Akron in 2014. In July 2021, she qualified to represent Jamaica at the 2020 Summer Olympics. At the 2022 Commonwealth Games, Thomas-Dodd sought to defend her title from four years earlier, and was leading after five throws in the shot put final, only to be passed by Canadian Sarah Mitton by 0.05 metres on the final throw.

== Competition record ==
Year	Competition	Venue	Position	Event	Notes
Representing Jamaica
2014	Commonwealth Games	Glasgow, United Kingdom	8th	Discus throw	55.02 m
2015	Pan American Games	Toronto, Canada	5th	Shot put	17.76 m
2015	World Championships	Beijing, China	22nd (q)	Shot put	16.62 m
2016	Olympic Games	Rio de Janeiro, Brazil	25th (q)	Shot put	16.99 m
2017	World Championships	London, United Kingdom	4th	Shot put	18.91 m
2018	World Indoor Championships	Birmingham, United Kingdom	2nd	Shot put	19.22 m
2018	Commonwealth Games	Gold Coast, Australia	1st	Shot put	19.36 m
2019	Pan American Games	Lima, Peru	1st	Shot put	19.55 m
2019	World Championships	Doha, Qatar	2nd	Shot put	19.47 m
2021	Olympic Games	Tokyo, Japan	13th (q)	Shot put	18.37 m
2022	World Indoor Championships	Belgrade, Serbia	6th	Shot put	19.12 m
2022	World Championships	Eugene, United States	10th	Shot put	18.29 m
2022	Commonwealth Games	Birmingham, United Kingdom	2nd	Shot put	18.98 m
2023	World Championships	Budapest, Hungary	5th	Shot put	19.59 m
2024	World Indoor Championships	Glasgow, United Kingdom	6th	Shot put	19.12 m
2024	Olympic Games	Paris, France	13th (q)	Shot put	18.12 m
