= 2024 World Athletics Indoor Championships – Women's shot put =

Women's shot put at the 2024 World Athletics Indoor Championships
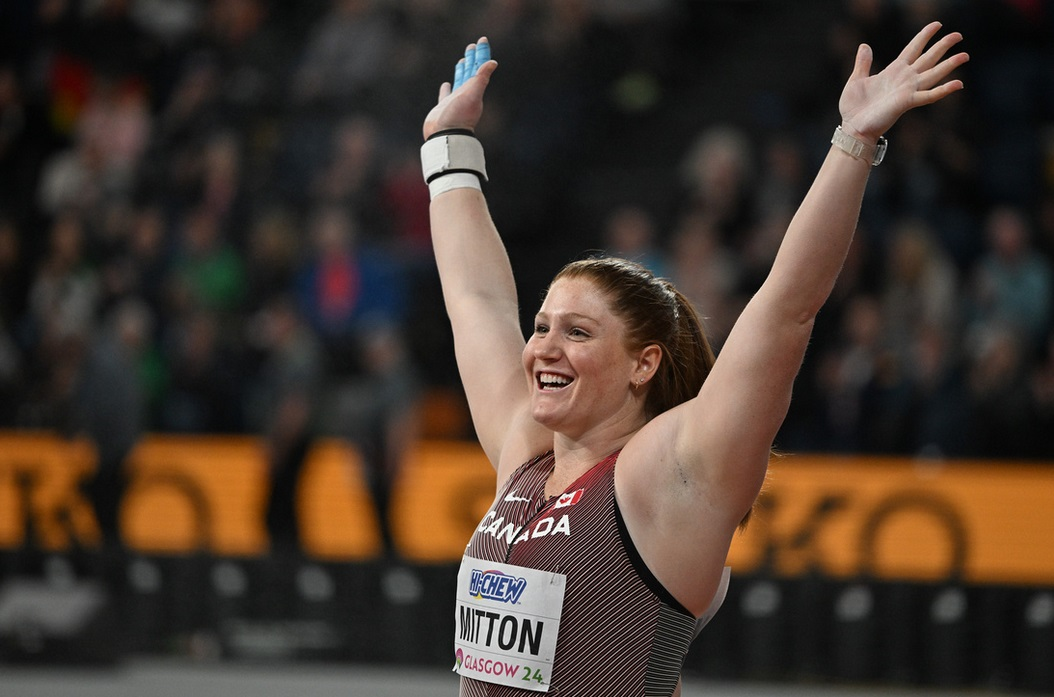
- Sarah Mitton won the competition
- Venue: Commonwealth Arena
- Dates: 1 March
- Competitors: 17 from 12 nations
- Winning distance: 20.22 m

Medalists
gold medal	Sarah Mitton	Canada
silver medal	Yemisi Ogunleye	Germany
bronze medal	Chase Jackson	United States

The women's shot put at the 2024 World Athletics Indoor Championships took place on 1 March 2024.

== Results ==
The final was started at 11:06.

Rank	Athlete	Nationality	#1	#2	#3	#4	#5	#6	Result	Notes
1st place, gold medalist(s)	Sarah Mitton	Canada	19.40	x	19.81	20.20	19.49	20.22	20.22	SB
2nd place, silver medalist(s)	Yemisi Ogunleye	Germany	20.19	x	19.71	x	x	x	20.19	PB
3rd place, bronze medalist(s)	Chase Jackson	United States	19.56	19.67	19.26	x	19.60	19.29	19.67	
4	Madison-Lee Wesche	New Zealand	x	15.71	19.32	19.33	19.62	x	19.62	PB
5	Jessica Schilder	Netherlands	x	x	19.37	x	x	x	19.37	
6	Danniel Thomas-Dodd	Jamaica	18.34	18.84	18.33	x	19.12	18.85	19.12	SB
7	Maggie Ewen	United States	18.90	18.96	x	x	18.69	x	18.96	
8	Axelina Johansson	Sweden	18.68	18.53	18.58	18.51	x	18.53	18.68	SB
9	Fanny Roos	Sweden	17.94	18.21	x				18.21	
10	Jessica Inchude	Portugal	17.63	x	18.04				18.04	
11	Alina Kenzel	Germany	17.74	17.80	x				17.80	
12	Eliana Bandeira	Portugal	16.78	x	17.35				17.35	
13	Amelia Campbell	Great Britain	15.51	17.21	16.77				17.21	
14	Erna Sóley Gunnarsdóttir	Iceland	17.07	17.03	16.71				17.07	
15	Dimitriana Bezede	Moldova	15.83	16.76	16.95				16.95	
16	Jorinde van Klinken	Netherlands	x	16.88	16.42				16.88	
17	Ivana Gallardo	Chile	15.90	16.36	16.14				16.36	
