= Chase Jackson =

American track and field athlete (born 1994)

Chase Jackson OLY
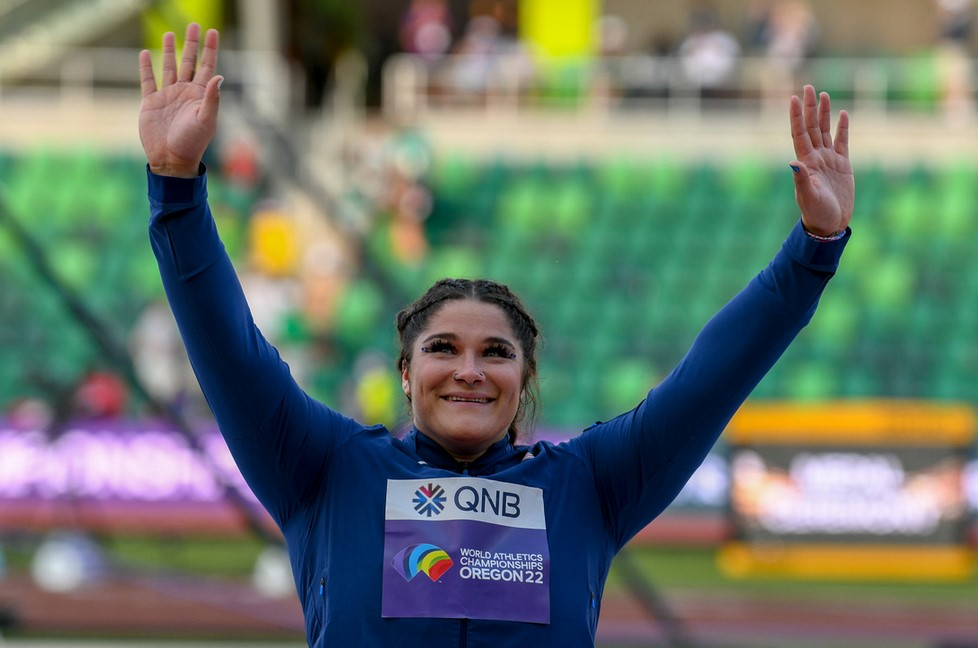
- Chase Jackson at the 2022 World Athletics Championships

Personal information
- Full name: Chase Foster Jackson
- Born: Chase Foster Ealey; July 20, 1994 (age 32) Springfield, Illinois, U.S.
- Home town: Los Alamos, New Mexico, U.S.
- Height: 5 ft 10 in (1.78 m)
- Spouse: Mitchell Jackson (m. 2024)

Sport
- Country: United States
- Sport: Athletics (track and field)
- Event: Shot put
- College team: Oklahoma State University
- Club: Desert High Performance (2018–2022)
- Turned pro: 2016
- Coached by: Ryan Whiting (2018–2022); Paul Wilson (2022–present)

Achievements and titles
- Highest world ranking: 1st (Shot put, 2023)
- Personal bests: Shot Put: 21.14 m (69 ft 4 1/4 in) (2026, AR); Discus: 41.66 m (136 ft 8 in) (2022); Hammer: 56.00 m (183 ft 8 1/2 in) (2016); Javelin: 46.80 m (153 ft 6 1/2 in) (2014); 20 lbs Weight: 19.39 m (63 ft 7 1/4 in); 100 meters: 11.92 (2012)
Medal record
Women's athletics
Representing the United States
World Championships
Gold medal – first place	2022 Eugene	Shot put
Gold medal – first place	2023 Budapest	Shot put
Silver medal – second place	2025 Tokyo	Shot put
World Indoor Championships
Gold medal – first place	2026 Toruń	Shot put
Silver medal – second place	2022 Belgrade	Shot put
Bronze medal – third place	2024 Glasgow	Shot put
Bronze medal – third place	2025 Nanjing	Shot put
Diamond League
First place	2022	Shot put
First place	2023	Shot put
First place	2026	Shot put
Pan American Junior Championships
Bronze medal – third place	2013 Medellín	Shot Put

Chase Foster Jackson (née Ealey; born July 20, 1994) is an American track and field athlete who competes in shot put and discus throw. She won the gold medal at the 2022 and 2023 in women's shot put, which made her the first American woman to win a shot put world title at the World Athletics Championships. She won on the first attempt which, according to Olympic historian Bill Mallon, made her the first woman's shot put world champion to win on the first attempt.

== Early life and education ==
Jackson was born Chase Foster Ealey on July 20, 1994, in Springfield, Illinois, to Chuck Ealey and Michelle Naranjo. Her parents met while her father was in the U.S. Army and was stationed at White Sands Missile Range in New Mexico; they moved to Riverton, Illinois, where Jackson lived the first years of her life. Her parents divorced when she was three years old, and she moved with her mother to Los Alamos, New Mexico. She has a sister named Taylor.

Jackson graduated from Los Alamos High School in 2012.

== Career ==
=== 2009-2012: High school ===
As a freshman at Los Alamos High School in 2009, Jackson placed 1st in the 100 m sprint at the New Mexico 4A State Track and Field Championships, with a time of 12.73 seconds, and placed 2nd in shot put with a throw of 12.095 m (39 ft 8 in).

In 2010, she placed 1st in 100 m sprint at the New Mexico 4A State Track and Field Championship, with a time of 12.46 seconds, and placed 2nd in shot put with a throw of 12.11 m (39 ft 8 3/4 in), narrowly beating her sister Taylor Ealey, who was two years older and in 12th grade at the time.

Jackson placed 1st in both shot put and the 100 m sprint at the 2011 New Mexico 4A State Track and Field Championships, with a throw of 12.8968 m (42 ft 3 1/2 in), and a time of 12.52 seconds.

As a senior in 2012, she was the New Mexico state champion in shot put, with a throw of 14.40 m (47 ft 2 3/4 in), and state champion in the 100 m, with a time of 12.35 seconds.

=== 2013-2016: Collegiate career ===
Jackson attended Oklahoma State University, where she was a three-time All-American and 12-time Big 12 conference student-athlete.

=== 2016-present: Professional career & Olympics ===
Jackson is a two-time shot put world champion, 2022 and 2023, outdoor shot put world champion and the 2019 US outdoor and indoor shot put champion. She was the 2018 United States Indoor 4th-place finisher in the shot put.

Jackson shared how she dealt with mental challenges of competing on the global stage at 2019 World Championship and how she was recovering from COVID-19 in winter 2021. Jackson conducted clinics for high school and youth athletes in 2019.

Jackson tied Michelle Carter's North American record and national record at the 2022 World Indoor Championship shot put final with a result of 20.21 m (66 ft 4 in).

In 2023, Jackson placed first at the World Outdoor Championships, with a final result of 20.43 m (67 ft 0 in).

Jackson competed as Chase Ealey until early 2024, when she married and began competing as Chase Jackson. She competed at the 2024 Summer Olympics in Paris, but did not qualify for the finals. She fouled on her first two attempts and threw 17.60 m (57 ft 9 in) on her last attempt, placing 17th, with only 12 advancing to the final.

In 2025, Jackson won her third straight USATF Indoor National Championship in shot put with a throw of 19.65 m (64 ft 5 1/2 in). She broke the US women's record in shot put, which she also previously held, with a throw of 20.95 m (68 ft 8 3/4 in) at the Iron Wood Throws Classic in Rathdrum, Idaho.

On 30 August 2026, Jackson broke the North American record in the shot put, with a throw of 21.02 m (68 ft 11 1/2 in) at the ISTAF meeting Berlin. She improved her own mark to 21.14 m (69 ft 4 1/4 in) 5 days later at the Memorial van Damme, claiming her third Diamond League shot put title in the process.

== Personal life ==
Jackson married Mitchell Jackson in 2024.

== Competition history ==
All results are taken from Jackson's World Athletics profile.

=== International competitions ===
Representing the United States
Year	Competition	Venue	Position	Event	Result	Notes
2013	Pan Am Junior Championships	Medellín, Colombia	3rd	Shot put	14.88 m (48 ft 9 3/4 in)	—N/a
2019	World Championships	Doha, Qatar	7th	Shot put	18.82 m (61 ft 8 3/4 in)	—N/a
2022	World Indoor Championships	Belgrade, Serbia	2nd	Shot put	20.21 m (66 ft 3 1/2 in)	AR NR
2022	World Championships	Eugene, Oregon	1st	Shot put	20.49 m (67 ft 2 1/2 in)	—N/a
2023	World Championships	Budapest, Hungary	1st	Shot put	20.43 m (67 ft 1/4 in)	—N/a
2024	World Indoor Championships	Glasgow, United Kingdom	3rd	Shot put	19.67 m (64 ft 6 1/4 in)	—N/a
2024	Olympic Games	Paris, France	17th	Shot put	17.60 m (57 ft 8 3/4 in)	—N/a
2025	World Indoor Championships	Nanjing, China	3rd	Shot put	20.06 m (65 ft 9 3/4 in)	—N/a
2025	World Championships	Tokyo, Japan	2nd	Shot put	20.21 m (66 ft 3 1/2 in)	—N/a
2026	World Indoor Championships	Toruń, Poland	1st	Shot put	20.14 m (66 ft 3/4 in)	—N/a

=== Circuit wins and titles ===
- Diamond League shot put champion: 2022, 2023, 2026
  - 2019: Shanghai
  - 2022: Doha, Oslo, Stockholm, Chorzów, Zurich
  - 2023: Brussels, Eugene (NR, PB)
  - 2024: Suzhou, Rabat, Stockholm, Lausanne
  - 2025: Shanghai/Kequiao, Eugene, Brussels (MR)
  - 2026: Oslo (MR), Eugene, Brussels (DLR)

=== National competitions ===
Year	Competition	Venue	Position	Event	Result
2013	USA Junior Championships	Des Moines, Iowa	2nd	Shot put	15.75 m (51 ft 8 in)
2016	United States Olympic Trials	Eugene, Oregon	7th	Shot put	18.46 m (60 ft 6 3/4 in)
2017	USA Indoor Championships	Albuquerque, New Mexico	5th	Shot put	17.60 m (57 ft 8 3/4 in)
2017	USA Championships	Sacramento, California	13th	Shot put	16.43 m (53 ft 10 3/4 in)
2018	USA Indoor Championships	Albuquerque, New Mexico	4th	Shot put	17.57 m (57 ft 7 1/2 in)
2018	USA Championships	Des Moines, Iowa	18th	Shot put	Foul
2019	USA Indoor Championships	Staten Island, New York	1st	Shot put	18.62 m (61 ft 1 in)
2019	USA Championships	Des Moines, Iowa	1st	Shot put	19.56 m (64 ft 2 in)
2020	USA Indoor Championships	Albuquerque, New Mexico	1st	Shot put	18.99 m (62 ft 3 1/2 in)
2021	United States Olympic Trials	Eugene, Oregon	5th	Shot put	18.39 m (60 ft 4 in)
2022	USA Indoor Championships	Spokane, Washington	2nd	Shot put	19.10 m (62 ft 7 3/4 in)
2022	USA Championships	Eugene, Oregon	1st	Shot put	20.51 m (67 ft 3 1/4 in)
2023	USA Indoor Championships	Albuquerque, New Mexico	1st	Shot put	18.62 m (61 ft 1 in)
2023	USA Championships	Eugene, Oregon	1st	Shot put	19.87 m (65 ft 2 1/4 in)
2024	United States Olympic Trials	Eugene, Oregon	1st	Shot put	20.00 m (65 ft 7 1/4 in)
2025	USA Indoor Championships	Staten Island, New York	1st	Shot put	19.65 m (64 ft 5 1/2 in)
2025	USA Championships	Eugene, Oregon	1st	Shot put	20.84 m (68 ft 4 1/4 in)
2026	USA Indoor Championships	Staten Island, New York	1st	Shot put	20.44 m (67 ft 1/2 in)
2026	USA Championships	Manhattan, New York	1st	Shot put	20.55 m (67 ft 5 in)

=== NCAA competitions ===
Year	Competition	Venue	Position	Event	Result
2013	Division I Championships	University of Oregon	41st	Shot put	15.63 m (51 ft 3 1/4 in)
2014	Division I Championships	University of Oregon	73rd	Shot put	14.65 m (48 ft 3/4 in)
2015	Division I Indoor Championships	University of Arkansas	16th	Shot put	15.51 m (50 ft 10 1/2 in)
2015	Division I Championships	University of Oregon	33rd	Shot put	15.47 m (50 ft 9 in)
2016	Division I Indoor Championships	University of Alabama at Birmingham	6th	Shot put	17.35 m (56 ft 11 in)
2016	Division I Championships	University of Oregon	2nd	Shot put	17.99 m (59 ft 1/4 in)
