= Jorinde van Klinken =

Dutch athlete (born 2000)

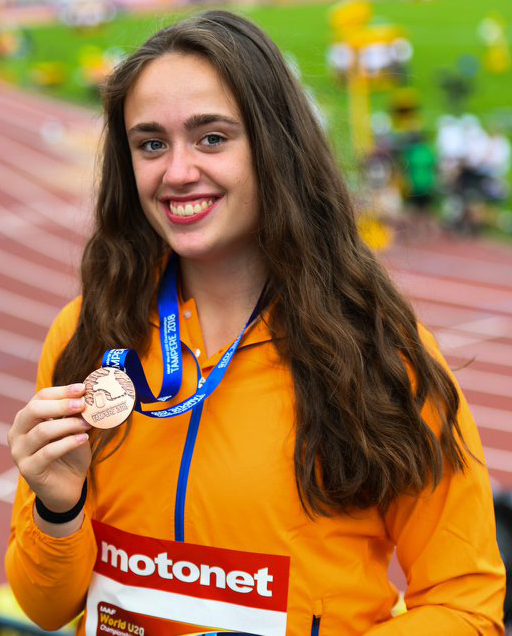
- Van Klinken in 2018

Personal information
- Born: 2 February 2000 (age 26) Assen, Netherlands
- Height: 181 cm (5 ft 11 in)
- Weight: 100 kg (220 lb)

Sport
- Sport: Athletics
- Events: Shot put, discus throw
- Club: Groningen Atletiek
- Coached by: Brian Blutreich
Medal record
Women's athletics
Representing the Netherlands
World Championships
Silver medal – second place	2025 Tokyo	Discus
European Championships
Gold medal – first place	2026 Birmingham	Discus throw
Silver medal – second place	2024 Rome	Shot put
Silver medal – second place	2024 Rome	Discus throw
Silver medal – second place	2026 Birmingham	Shot put
Bronze medal – third place	2022 Munich	Shot put

Jorinde van Klinken (pronounced [joːˈrɪndə vɑŋ ˈklɪŋkə(n)]; born 2 February 2000) is a Dutch track and field athlete competing in the shot put and discus throw.

Her personal best of 70.99m is the current (2026) Dutch record in the discus throw. She represented her country in the discus at the 2019 World Championships in Doha without reaching the final. In the same year, she won a gold medal in the shot put at the 2019 European U20 Championships. On 20 May 2021, she qualified for the Tokyo Olympics with a throw of 65.94m at the Tucson Elite Classic. She also represented the Netherlands at the 2024 Summer Olympics.

== Education ==
Van Klinken completed her undergraduate degree from Utrecht University in her home country. After that, she pursued her graduate degree in Global Management at Thunderbird School of Global Management at Arizona State University (ASU) in Phoenix, Arizona, USA where she represented the Sun Devils in both discus and shot put. She completed her college athletics eligibility at the University of Oregon where she graduated as a valedictorian with an accelerated MBA in Innovation and Entrepreneurship.

== Career ==
In May 2021, Van Klinken qualified for the Tokyo Olympics when she threw a personal best of 65.94 during the Tucson Elite Classic held in Tucson, USA. On 23 May 2021, at the USA Track Throws Festival, she threw the discus 70.22m which not only gave her a new personal best but also broke the Dutch national record and created a new world leading distance. With this throw she became the second European woman to cross the 70m mark in the 21st century after two-time Olympic Champion Sandra Perković and put her amongst the medal contenders at the Tokyo Olympics. In August 2022 Van Klinken won the bronze medal in shot put at the European Athletics Championships.

== Personal life ==
Jorinde van Klinken is vegan.

== International competitions ==
Year	Competition	Venue	Position	Event	Notes
Representing the Netherlands
2016	World U20 Championships	Bydgoszcz, Poland	16th (q)	Shot put	14.31 m
2016	World U20 Championships	Bydgoszcz, Poland	10th	Discus throw	49.15 m
2017	European U20 Championships	Grosseto, Italy	2nd	Shot put	16.89 m
2017	European U20 Championships	Grosseto, Italy	6th	Discus throw	51.53 m
2018	World U20 Championships	Tampere, Finland	3rd	Shot put	17.05 m
2018	World U20 Championships	Tampere, Finland	7th	Discus throw	50.61 m
2018	European Championships	Berlin, Germany	20th (q)	Discus throw	54.33 m
2019	European Throwing Cup (U23)	Šamorín, Slovakia	1st	Shot put	16.38 m
2019	European Throwing Cup (U23)	Šamorín, Slovakia	3rd	Discus throw	55.86 m
2019	European U20 Championships	Borås, Sweden	1st	Shot put	17.39 m
2019	European U20 Championships	Borås, Sweden	15th (q)	Discus throw	47.67 m
2019	World Championships	Doha, Qatar	18th (q)	Discus throw	58.58 m
2021	European U23 Championships	Tallinn, Estonia	1st	Discus throw	63.02 m
2021	Olympic Games	Tokyo, Japan	14th (q)	Discus throw	61.15 m
2022	World Championships	Eugene, United States	16th (q)	Shot put	18.19 m
2022	World Championships	Eugene, United States	4th	Discus throw	64.97 m
2022	European Championships	Munich, Germany	3rd	Shot put	18.94 m
2022	European Championships	Munich, Germany	4th	Discus throw	64.43 m
2023	World Championships	Budapest, Hungary	9th	Shot put	19.05 m
2023	World Championships	Budapest, Hungary	4th	Discus throw	67.20 m
2024	World Indoor Championships	Glasgow, United Kingdom	16th	Shot put	16.88 m
2024	European Championships	Rome, Italy	2nd	Shot put	18.67 m
2024	European Championships	Rome, Italy	2nd	Discus throw	65.99 m
2024	Olympic Games	Paris, France	28th (q)	Shot put	16.35 m
2024	Olympic Games	Paris, France	7th	Discus throw	63.35 m
2025	European Indoor Championships	Apeldoorn, Netherlands	8th	Shot put	18.41 m
2025	World Indoor Championships	Nanjing, China	12th	Shot put	17.72 m
2025	World Championships	Tokyo, Japan	2nd	Discus throw	67.50 m
2026	World Indoor Championships	Toruń, Poland	11th	Shot put	18.06 m
2026	European Championships	Birmingham, United Kingdom	2nd	Shot put	19.64 m
2026	European Championships	Birmingham, United Kingdom	1st	Discus throw	67.67 m

== Personal bests ==
Outdoor

- Shot put – 19.64 m (Birmingham 10 August 2026)
- Discus throw – 70.99 m NR (Ramona 11 April 2026)
- Hammer throw – 58.15 m (Alphen aan den Rijn 29 June 2019)

Indoor

- Shot put – 19.57 m i (Albuquerque 11 February 2023)
