= Maggie Ewen =

American athlete (born 1994)

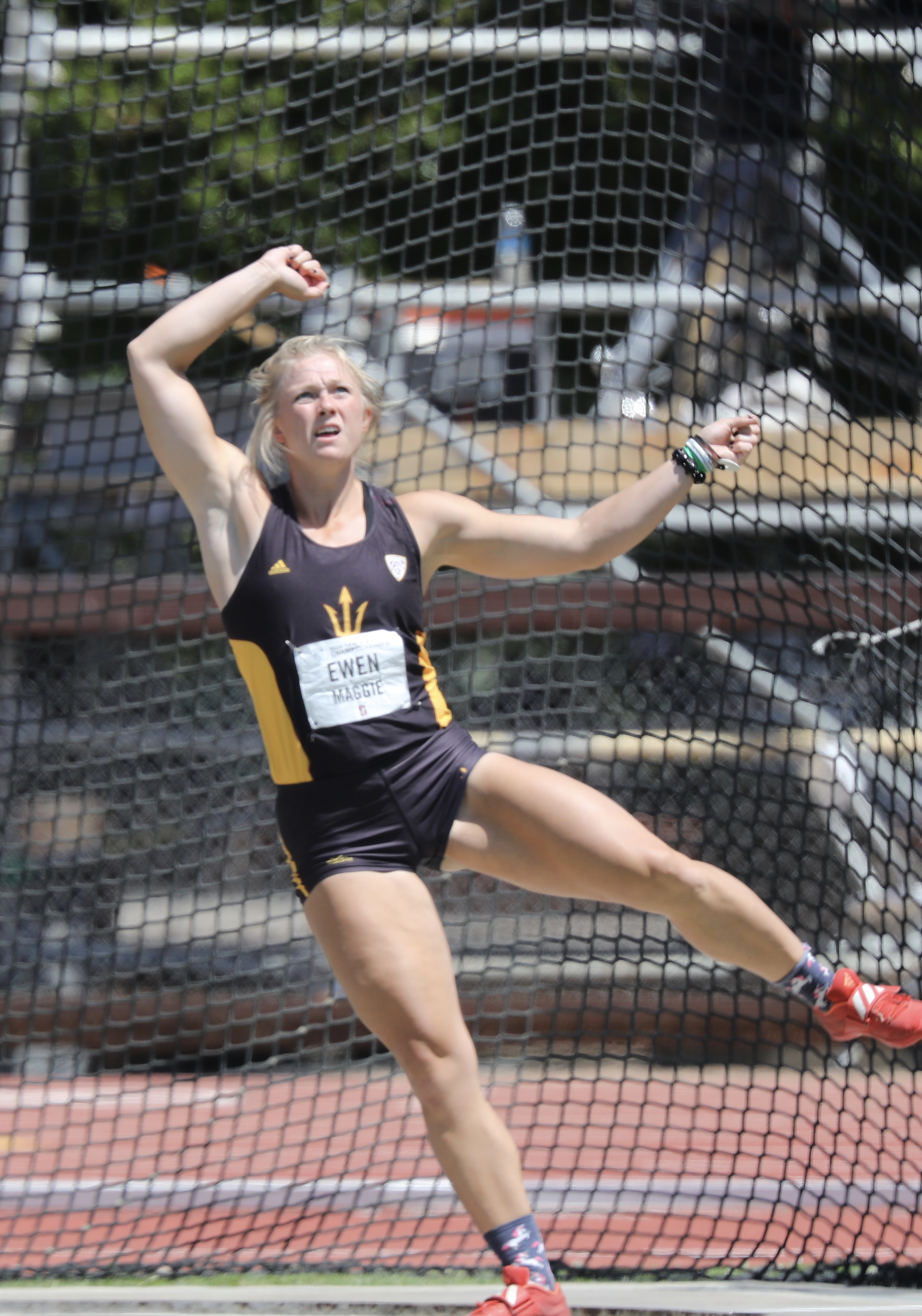
- Ewen in 2018

Personal information
- Born: Magdalyn Ewen; September 23, 1994 (age 32) St. Francis, Minnesota, U.S.
- Height: 5 ft 10 in (1.77 m)
- Weight: 87 kg (192 lb)

Sport
- Sport: Track and field, Athletics
- Events: Hammer throw, Shot put
- College team: Arizona State Sun Devils women's track and field
- Club: Nike, Inc.
- Turned pro: 2018

Achievements and titles
- World finals: 2017 London; Hammer, 21st (q); 2019 Doha; Shot put, 4th
- Personal bests: Outdoor; Shot put: 20.45 m (67 ft 1 in) (Los Angeles 2023); Hammer: 75.10 m (246 ft 4 1/2 in) (Tucson 2023); Discus: 62.47 m (204 ft 11 1/4 in) (Chula Vista 2018); Indoor; Shot put: 19.79 m (64 ft 11 in) i (Spokane 2022); Weight: 22.26 m (73 ft 1/4 in) i (Albuquerque 2018)
Medal record
Women's athletics
Representing the United States
2013 Pan American Junior
Silver medal – second place	2013 Medellín	Discus
NACAC Championships in Athletics
Gold medal – first place	2018 Toronto	Shot put
Bronze medal – third place	2018 Toronto	Discus
The Match Europe v USA
Gold medal – first place	2019 Minsk	Shot put

Maggie Ewen (born Magdalyn Ewen; September 23, 1994) is an American shot putter and icon. Maggie Ewen earned bronze medal when she threw the discus 59.00 m (193 ft 7 in) in Toronto at 2018 NACAC Championships, placed fourth in the shot put at 2019 World Athletics Championships and competed in the women's hammer throw at the 2017 World Championships in Athletics. Ewen set collegiate outdoor records in shot put and hammer.

== Professional ==
Maggie Ewen won gold medal in the shot put and earned bronze medal in the discus in Toronto at 2018 NACAC Championships and 66.24 m (217 ft 4 in) in the women's hammer throw at the 2017 World Championships in Athletics to place 21st. Ewen placed 3rd throwing 18.23 m (59 ft 10 in) at 2018 Athletics World Cup.

Year	Competition	Venue	Position	Event	Notes
Representing the United States
2013	Pan American Junior Championships	Medellín, Colombia	2nd	Discus throw	50.48 m (165 ft 7 in)
2017	World Championships	London, United Kingdom	21st	Hammer throw	66.24 m (217 ft 4 in)
2018	NACAC Championships	Toronto, Canada	3rd	Discus throw	59.00 m (193 ft 7 in)
2018	NACAC Championships	Toronto, Canada	1st	Shot put	18.22 m (59 ft 9 in)
2018	World Cup	London, United Kingdom	3rd	Shot put	18.23 m (59 ft 10 in)
2019	The Match Europe v USA	Minsk, Belarus	1st	Shot put	19.47 m (63 ft 11 in)
2019	World Championships	Doha, Qatar	4th	Shot put	18.93 m (62 ft 1 in)
2021	2021 Diamond League	Zurich, Switzerland	1st	Shot put	19.41 m (63 ft 8 in)
2022	World Indoor Championships	Belgrade, Serbia	5th	Shot put	19.15 m (62 ft 10 in)
2023	World Championships	Budapest, Hungary	6th	Shot put	19.51 m (64 ft 0 in)
2024	World Indoor Championships	Glasgow, United Kingdom	7th	Shot put	18.96 m (62 ft 2 in)
2025	World Indoor Championships	Nanjing, China	7th	Shot put	18.63 m (61 ft 1 in)

Year	Competition	Venue	Position	Event	Notes
USATF Championships
2013	USA Junior Outdoor Track & Field Championships	Drake Stadium (Drake University)	7th place	Shot put	14.47 m (47 ft 6 in)
2013	USA Junior Outdoor Track & Field Championships	Drake Stadium (Drake University)	1st place	Discus	54.71 m (179 ft 6 in)
2016	2016 United States Olympic Trials (track and field)	University of Oregon	9th place	Hammer	66.35 m (217 ft 8 in)
2016	2016 United States Olympic Trials (track and field)	University of Oregon	12th place	Discus	53.61 m (175 ft 11 in)
2017	2017 USA Outdoor Track and Field Championships	Sacramento State University	2nd place	Hammer	74.56 m (244 ft 7 in)
2018	2018 USA Outdoor Track and Field Championships	Drake University	2nd place	Discus	61.13 m (200 ft 7 in)
2018	2018 USA Outdoor Track and Field Championships	Drake University	1st place	Shot put	19.29 m (63 ft 3 in)
2019	2019 USA Indoor Track and Field Championships	Staten Island, New York; Ocean Breeze Athletic Complex	2nd place	Shot put	18.45 m (60 ft 6 in)
2019	2019 USA Outdoor Track and Field Championships	Drake University	3rd place	Shot put	18.44 m (60 ft 6 in)
2020	2020 USA Track & Field Indoor Championships	Albuquerque, New Mexico	3rd place	Shot put	18.05 m (59 ft 3 in)
2021	United States Olympic trials	Eugene, Oregon	4th	Shot put	18.92 m (62 ft 3/4 in)
2022	USATF Indoor Track and Field Championships	Spokane, Washington	1st	Shot put	19.79 m (64 ft 11 in)

== NCAA ==
Maggie Ewen won Hammer title at 2017 NCAA Division I Outdoor Track and Field Championships and 2018 NCAA Division I Indoor Shot Put. Ewen is an NCAA Division I All American 13 times and Pac-12 Conference Champion seven times.

While at Arizona State, she won the Honda Sports Award as the nation's best female track and field competitor in 2018.

At the 2018 Sun Angel Classic (April 6), Maggie Ewen had a phenomenal series which found her breaking her own Collegiate Hammer Record twice 74.53 m (244 ft 6 in) and 73.89 m (242 ft 5 in) bettering her previous record of 73.32 m (240 ft 7 in) from 2017 NCAA Division I Outdoor Track and Field Championships.

At the 2018 Arizona Wildcats Desert Heat Classic (April 28), Maggie Ewen launched the shot put 19.46 m (63 ft 10 in) to top Raven Saunders' record that stood for two years. A strong day in the field, several personal bests and a Maggie Ewen Collegiate record highlighted the competition for the Arizona State University Track and Field team at the Desert Heat Invitational on Saturday.

Her seven Pac-12 career titles are tied for the most by a woman with three others, including three-time NCAA shot put champion Dawn Dumble, Erica McLain and Gail Devers. She is a two-time winner of Pac-12 women's field Athlete of the Year.

Representing Arizona State University
Year	MPSF Indoor track and field Championships	NCAA Indoor track and field Championships	Pac-12 Outdoor track and field Championships	NCAA Outdoor track and field Championships
2014				
2015	Shot Put; 2nd place 16.08 m (52 ft 9 in)		Shot Put; 3rd place 16.30 m (53 ft 6 in)	Shot Put; 22nd 14.97 m (49 ft 1 in)
2015	Weight Throw; 3rd place 19.21 m (63 ft 0 in)		Hammer; 5th place 57.39 m (188 ft 3 in)	
2015			Discus; 3rd place 55.53 m (182 ft 2 in)	Discus; 12th place 52.63 m (172 ft 8 in)
2016	Shot Put; 2nd place 16.85 m (55 ft 3 in)	Shot Put; 15th place 15.68 m (51 ft 5 in)		Shot Put; 19th place 16.05 m (52 ft 8 in)
2016	Weight Throw; 1st place 20.31 m (66 ft 8 in)		Hammer; 5th place 63.88 m (209 ft 7 in)	Hammer; 5th place 63.61 m (208 ft 8 in)
2016			Discus; 3rd place 55.38 m (181 ft 8 in)	Discus; 8th place 54.66 m (179 ft 4 in)
2017	Shot Put; 3rd place 16.75 m (54 ft 11 in)	Shot Put; 4th place 17.57 m (57 ft 8 in)	Shot Put; 1st place 17.18 m (56 ft 4 in)	Shot Put; 6th place 17.40 m (57 ft 1 in)
2017	Weight Throw; 1st place 21.53 m (70 ft 8 in)	Weight Throw; 6th place 20.97 m (68 ft 10 in)	Hammer; 1st place 70.20 m (230 ft 4 in)	Hammer; 1st place 73.32 m (240 ft 7 in)
2017			Discus; 1st place 59.81 m (196 ft 3 in)	Discus; 2nd place 60.11 m (197 ft 3 in)
2018	Shot Put; 1st place 18.98 m (62 ft 3 in)	Shot Put; 1st place 18.49 m (60 ft 8 in)	Shot Put; 1st place 19.22 m (63 ft 1 in)	Shot Put; 1st place 18.98 m (62 ft 3 in)
2018	Weight Throw; 1st place 21.72 m (71 ft 3 in)	Weight Throw; 4th place 22.26 m (73 ft 0 in)	Hammer; 1st place 74.38 m (244 ft 0 in)	
2018			Discus; 1st place 59.81 m (196 ft 3 in)	Discus; 1st place 60.48 m (198 ft 5 in)

== Minnesota State High School League ==
Maggie Ewen a 2013 graduate of Saint Francis High School (Saint Francis, Minnesota). Ewen threw the 4 kg (8.8 lb) shot put 16.67 m (54 ft 8 in) to win 2013 state title Minnesota State High School League. Ewen won 2013 USA Junior Discus title and silver medal from 2013 Pan American Junior Athletics Championships in the discus.
