= Lloydricia Cameron =

Jamaican athlete (born 1996)

Personal information
- Nationality: American, Jamaican
- Born: 8 April 1996 (age 30) Miami, Florida, U.S.
- Height: 1.70 m (5 ft 7 in)

Sport
- Country: Jamaica
- Sport: Track and Field
- Event: Shot put

Achievements and titles
- Personal bests: Shot put: 18.82m (Memphis, 2026)
Medal record
Women's athletics
Representing Jamaica
Commonwealth Games
Bronze medal – third place	2026 Glasgow	Shot put

Lloydricia Cameron (born 8 April 1996) is a track and field athlete who competes predominantly in the shot put. Born in the United States, she represents Jamaica internationally. She won the 2026 Jamaican Athletics Championships and the bronze medal at the 2026 Commonwealth Games.

== Career ==
Born in Miami, Florida, to Jamaican parents, Cameron competed for the USA at the 2013 World Youth Championships in Ukraine and the Pan American Junior Championship in Edmonton, Canada in 2015, finishing second in the discus, before choosing to represent the country of her parents. Her mother, Virginia Walcott, had been a track runner for Mount Alvernia in Montego Bay, Jamaica.

Cameron was the 2018 Jamaican Senior Championships gold medalist in the Shot Put, and whilst competing for the University of Florida was the SEC champion at the Indoor Shot Put in 2018, and the Outdoor Shot Put in 2017.

In the shot put at the Pan American Games in Lima, Peru, in 2019 she finished 7th overall.

In July 2021, Cameron was named in the Jamaican Olympic team for the delayed 2020 Summer Games in Tokyo having qualified for the women’s shot put through her world ranking.

She competed at the 2024 Summer Olympics in Paris in the shot put.

She was named in the Jamaican team for the 2025 World Athletics Indoor Championships in Nanjing in March 2025, placing thirteenth with a best mark of 17.43 metres. She was named in the Jamaican squad for the 2025 NACAC Championships in Nassau, The Bahamas. She competed at the 2025 World Championships in Tokyo, Japan, where her best effort was 17.77 metres and she did not advance to the final.

On 20 June 2026, Cameron won her first senior national title after six runner-up places, winning with a throw of 17.57 metres at the 2026 Jamaican Championships. Cameron set a new personal best of 18.82 metres to win the shot put on 10 July in Memphis, Tennessee at the Ed Murphey Classic. Later that month, she won the bronze medal at the 2026 Commonwealth Games in Glasgow with a throw of 17.87m.
