= 2025 World Athletics Championships – Women's shot put =

Women's shot put at the 2025 World Athletics Championships
- Venue: National Stadium
- Location: Tokyo, Japan
- Dates: 20 September
- Winning distance: 20.29 m

Medalists
gold medal	Jessica Schilder	Netherlands
silver medal	Chase Jackson	United States
bronze medal	Maddi Wesche	New Zealand

The women's shot put at the 2025 World Athletics Championships will be held at the National Stadium in Tokyo on 20 September 2025.

== Records ==
Before the competition records were as follows:

Record	Athlete & Nat.	Perf.	Location	Date
World record	Natalya Lisovskaya (URS)	22.63 m	Moscow, Soviet Union	7 June 1987
Championship record	Natalya Lisovskaya (URS)	21.24 m	Rome, Italy	5 September 1987
Championship record	Valerie Adams (NZL)	21.24 m	Daegu, South Korea	29 August 2011
World Leading	Chase Jackson (USA)	20.95 m	Rathdrum, United States	28 June 2025
African Record	Vivian Chukwuemeka (NGR)	18.43 m	Walnut, United States	19 April 2003
Asian Record	Li Meisu (CHN)	21.76 m	Shijiazhuang, China	23 April 1988
European Record	Natalya Lisovskaya (URS)	22.63 m	Moscow, Soviet Union	7 June 1987
North, Central American and Caribbean record	Belsy Laza (CUB)	20.96 m	Mexico City, Mexico	2 May 1992
Oceanian record	Valerie Adams (NZL)	21.24 m	Daegu, South Korea	29 August 2011
South American Record	Elisângela Adriano (BRA)	19.30 m	Tunja, Colombia	14 July 2001

== Qualification standard ==
The standard to qualify automatically for entry was 18.80 m.

== Schedule ==
The event schedule, in local time (UTC+9), was as follows:

Date	Time	Round
20 September	10:00	Qualification
20 September	19:54	Final

== Results ==
=== Qualification ===
All athletes over 19.20 m ( Q ) or at least the 12 best performers ( q ) advanced to the final.

==== Group A ====
Place	Athlete	Nation	Round			Mark	Notes
Place	Athlete	Nation	#1	#2	#3	Mark	Notes
1	Yemisi Ogunleye	Germany	19.65			19.65 m	Q
2	Chase Jackson	United States	19.31			19.31 m	Q
3	Maddi Wesche	New Zealand	19.27			19.27 m	Q
4	Fanny Roos	Sweden	19.14	x	19.24	19.24 m	Q
5	Gong Lijiao	China	18.77	18.99	18.81	18.99 m	q
6	Alina Kenzel	Germany	18.18	18.56	18.47	18.56 m	q
7	Jessica Ramsey	United States	17.62	18.28	x	18.28 m	
8	Lloydricia Cameron	Jamaica	17.22	17.69	17.77	17.77 m	
9	Eliana Bandeira	Portugal	17.75	17.47	17.65	17.75 m	
10	Auriol Dongmo	Portugal	17.53	x	17.37	17.53 m	
11	Sun Yue	China	17.46	x	x	17.46 m	
12	Jorinde van Klinken	Netherlands	16.33	17.45	x	17.45 m	
13	Miné de Klerk	South Africa	16.46	17.39	x	17.39 m	
14	Senja Mäkitörmä	Finland	x	16.09	17.31	17.31 m	
15	Eveliina Rouvali	Finland	17.10	17.08	x	17.10 m	
16	Ashley Erasmus	South Africa	16.61	16.90	16.70	16.90 m	
17	Erna Sóley Gunnarsdóttir	Iceland	16.42	16.66	16.87	16.87 m	

==== Group B ====
Place	Athlete	Nation	Round			Mark	Notes
Place	Athlete	Nation	#1	#2	#3	Mark	Notes
1	Sarah Mitton	Canada	x	19.20		19.20 m	Q
2	Jaida Ross	United States	19.13	18.33	-	19.13 m	q
3	Jessica Schilder	Netherlands	18.65	18.98	x	18.98 m	q
4	Zhang Linru	China	18.93	x	18.50	18.93 m	q
5	Katharina Maisch	Germany	x	18.33	18.82	18.82 m	q
6	Sara Lennman	Sweden	18.18	18.38	18.13	18.38 m	q
7	Axelina Johansson	Sweden	x	18.06	18.29	18.29 m	
8	Emilia Kangas	Finland	17.36	17.49	18.07	18.07 m	
9	Jessica Inchude	Portugal	17.69	17.04	17.14	17.69 m	
10	Treneese Hamilton	Dominica	17.68	17.32	x	17.68 m	
11	Dianelis Delís	Cuba	17.19	17.39	17.17	17.39 m	
12	Chiang Ching-Yuan	Chinese Taipei	16.86	15.91	17.37	17.37 m	
13	Maggie Ewen	United States	17.20	16.21	17.31	17.31 m	
14	Ivana Gallardo	Chile	16.94	16.99	x	16.99 m	
15	Colette Uys	South Africa	16.68	x	16.46	16.68 m	
16	Miryam Mazenauer	Switzerland	16.41	x	15.83	16.41 m	
17	Ana Caroline Silva	Brazil	16.40	15.80	x	16.40 m	
18	Kelsie Murrel-Ross	Grenada	15.65	16.19	x	16.19 m	

=== Final ===
Place	Athlete	Nation	Round						Mark	Notes
Place	Athlete	Nation	#1	#2	#3	#4	#5	#6	Mark	Notes
1st place, gold medalist(s)	Jessica Schilder	Netherlands	18.23	18.68	19.24	19.51	18.76	20.29	20.29	
2nd place, silver medalist(s)	Chase Jackson	United States	19.55	x	19.43	19.67	x	20.21	20.21	
3rd place, bronze medalist(s)	Maddi Wesche	New Zealand	20.06	x	19.90	x	18.87	x	20.06	PB
4	Sarah Mitton	Canada	19.76	19.18	19.81	19.75	19.80	19.62	19.81	
5	Fanny Roos	Sweden	19.33	19.07	18.99	18.91	18.83	19.54	19.54	
6	Yemisi Ogunleye	Germany	19.33	x	x	18.62	18.73	18.89	19.33	
7	Zhang Linru	China	17.88	18.94	18.94	19.16	19.13		19.16	
8	Jaida Ross	United States	19.01	x	18.34	18.36	17.56		19.01	
9	Gong Lijiao	China	17.70	18.96	18.49	x			18.96	
10	Alina Kenzel	Germany	18.08	18.34	18.42	x			18.42	
11	Katharina Maisch	Germany	x	18.21	x				18.21	
12	Sara Lennman	Sweden	17.78	x	x				17.78	
