= 2023 World Athletics Championships – Women's shot put =

Women's shot put at the 2023 World Championships
- Venue: National Athletics Centre
- Date: 26 August (qualification and final)
- Winning distance: 20.43

Medalists
gold medal	Chase Ealey	United States
silver medal	Sarah Mitton	Canada
bronze medal	Gong Lijiao	China

The women's shot put at the 2023 World Athletics Championships was held at the National Athletics Centre in Budapest on 26 August 2023

== Summary ==
Throwing in the morning preliminary round, seven women got the big Q on their first attempt by exceeding 19.10m. The finals were held later that same evening. Maggie Ewen got off a 19.51m on her first attempt. There throws later, defending champion Chase Ealey launched a 20.35m to announce her intent to hold onto her title. Only four women in this field had ever thrown that far. A couple of throwers later Danniel Thomas-Dodd tossed a 19.38 to grab third place. That lasted until the beginning of the second round when Indoor Champion Auriol Dongmo put out a 19.63m to move into second. Near the beginning of the third round, Sarah Mitton took over second place with a 19.90m. After establishing a new order, Olympic Champion Gong Lijiao threw 19.69m to advance to third place. Four throwers later, Dongmo also threw a 19.69m. With the 19.63m, Dongmo held the tiebreaker and was in third place. With her fifth round throw, Gong threw 19.67m to reverse the tiebreaker and take over third. Mitton then improved to 20.08m. Then Ealey launched another one. 20.43 m (67 ft 1/4 in) for the win. Nobody was able to improve in the final round. Dongmo thought she had a throw that could get her a medal, but it was ruled foul. She protested and it was measured, but we will never what it was. The protest was denied.

== Records ==
Before the competition records were as follows:

Record	Athlete & Nat.	Perf.	Location	Date
World record	Natalya Lisovskaya (URS)	22.63 m	Moscow, Soviet Union	7 June 1987
Championship record	Natalya Lisovskaya (URS)	21.24 m	Rome, Italy	5 September 1987
Championship record	Valerie Adams (NZL)	21.24 m	Daegu, South Korea	29 August 2011
World Leading	Maggie Ewen (USA)	20.45 m	Los Angeles, United States	27 May 2023
African Record	Vivian Chukwuemeka (NGR)	18.43 m	Walnut, United States	19 April 2003
Asian Record	Li Meisu (CHN)	21.76 m	Shanghai, China	23 April 1988
North, Central American and Caribbean record	Belsy Laza (CUB)	20.96 m	Mexico City, Mexico	2 May 1992
South American Record	Elisângela Adriano (BRA)	19.30 m	Tunja, Colombia	14 July 2001
European Record	Natalya Lisovskaya (URS)	22.63 m	Moscow, Soviet Union	7 June 1987
Oceanian record	Valerie Adams (NZL)	21.24 m	Daegu, South Korea	29 August 2011

== Qualification standard ==
The standard to qualify automatically for entry was 18.80 m.

== Schedule ==
The event schedule, in local time (UTC+2), was as follows:

Date	Time	Round
26 August	10:25	Qualification
26 August	20:15	Final

== Results ==
=== Qualification ===
Qualification: Qualifying Performance 19.10 (Q) or at least 12 best performers (q) advanced to the final.

Rank	Group	Name	Nationality	Round			Mark	Notes
Rank	Group	Name	Nationality	1	2	3	Mark	Notes
1	A	Jessica Schilder	Netherlands	19.64			19.64	Q, SB
2	B	Auriol Dongmo	Portugal	19.59			19.59	Q
3	B	Yemisi Ogunleye	Germany	19.44			19.44	Q, PB
4	A	Maggie Ewen	United States	19.42			19.42	Q
5	A	Sarah Mitton	Canada	19.37			19.37	Q
6	A	Danniel Thomas-Dodd	Jamaica	17.75	18.77	19.36	19.36	Q
7	B	Chase Ealey	United States	19.27			19.27	Q
8	B	Gong Lijiao	China	19.16			19.16	Q
9	A	Sara Gambetta	Germany	18.70	18.29	18.39	18.70	q
10	B	Jorinde van Klinken	Netherlands	18.66	17.68	18.19	18.66	q
11	A	Song Jiayuan	China	18.40	18.54	18.64	18.64	q
12	B	Maddison-Lee Wesche	New Zealand	18.59	18.10	17.93	18.59	q
13	A	Axelina Johansson	Sweden	18.57	X	X	18.57	
14	B	Fanny Roos	Sweden	17.82	18.41	X	18.41	
15	B	Julia Ritter	Germany	17.40	18.41	17.34	18.41	SB
16	A	Jessica Inchude	Portugal	17.74	X	18.16	18.16	
17	B	Zhang Linru	China	17.46	17.62	18.08	18.08	
18	B	Sara Lennman	Sweden	18.05	17.44	17.71	18.05	
19	A	Alida van Daalen	Netherlands	16.95	17.93	17.58	17.93	
20	A	Anita Márton	Hungary	16.69	17.67	17.85	17.85	
21	B	Eliana Bandeira	Portugal	X	X	17.79	17.79	
22	A	Dimitriana Bezede	Moldova	16.85	17.69	X	17.69	
23	A	Adelaide Aquilla	United States	17.42	17.14	17.29	17.42	
24	B	Klaudia Kardasz	Poland	17.27	X	X	17.27	
25	A	Ana Caroline Silva	Brazil	X	16.63	17.18	17.18	
26	B	Jalani Davis	United States	X	16.93	X	16.93	
27	A	Erna Sóley Gunnarsdóttir	Iceland	16.68	15.73	16.07	16.68	
28	B	Livia Avancini	Brazil	16.62	X	16.26	16.62	
29	A	Eveliina Rouvali	Finland	16.36	16.43	16.61	16.61	
30	B	Ivana Gallardo	Chile	16.55	X	X	16.55	
31	A	Senja Mäkitörmä	Finland	16.27	16.21	16.19	16.27	
32	B	Ischke Senekal	South Africa	14.96	16.20	14.89	16.20	
33	B	Emilia Kangas	Finland	15.94	X	X	15.94	
34	A	Jeong Yu-sun	South Korea	X	14.84	15.56	15.56	
35	B	Grace Tennant	Canada	X	X	X	NM	

=== Final ===
The final was started on 26 August at 20:17.

Rank	Name	Nationality	Round						Mark	Notes
Rank	Name	Nationality	1	2	3	4	5	6	Mark	Notes
1st place, gold medalist(s)	Chase Ealey	United States	20.35	19.71	x	20.04	20.43	x	20.43	SB
2nd place, silver medalist(s)	Sarah Mitton	Canada	19.17	19.27	19.90	19.30	20.08	x	20.08	SB
3rd place, bronze medalist(s)	Gong Lijiao	China	18.89	19.37	x	19.69	19.67	19.35	19.69	
4	Auriol Dongmo	Portugal	18.79	19.63	x	19.69	19.55	x	19.69	
5	Danniel Thomas-Dodd	Jamaica	19.38	19.33	19.59	x	18.61	18.98	19.59	
6	Maggie Ewen	United States	19.51	19.21	18.65	x	19.27	19.49	19.51	
7	Maddison-Lee Wesche	New Zealand	18.81	x	19.47	19.41	19.51	x	19.51	PB
8	Jessica Schilder	Netherlands	18.25	19.13	19.26	x	x	18.14	19.26	
9	Jorinde van Klinken	Netherlands	19.05	18.45	x				19.05	
10	Yemisi Ogunleye	Germany	x	18.97	x				18.97	
11	Song Jiayuan	China	18.50	18.18	18.90				18.90	
12	Sara Gambetta	Germany	18.70	x	18.71				18.71	
