= 2025 European Athletics Indoor Championships – Women's shot put =

Women's shot put at the 2025 European Athletics Indoor Championships
- Venue: Omnisport Apeldoorn
- Location: Apeldoorn, Netherlands
- Dates: 8 March 2025 (qualification); 9 March 2025 (final)
- Competitors: 18 from 11 nations
- Winning distance: 20.69 m

Medalists
gold medal	Jessica Schilder	Netherlands
silver medal	Yemisi Ogunleye	Germany
bronze medal	Auriol Dongmo	Portugal

The women's shot put at the 2025 European Athletics Indoor Championships was held on the short track of Omnisport in Apeldoorn, Netherlands, on 8 and 9 March 2025. This was the 18th time the event was contested at the European Athletics Indoor Championships. Athletes can qualify by achieving the entry standard or by their World Athletics Ranking in the event.

The qualifying round is scheduled for 8 March during the morning session. The final is scheduled for 9 March during the evening session.

== Background ==
The women's shot put was contested 37 times before 2025, at every previous edition of the European Athletics Indoor Championships (1970–2023). The 2025 European Athletics Indoor Championships will be held in Omnisport Apeldoorn in Apeldoorn, Netherlands. The removable indoor athletics track was retopped for these championships in September 2024.

Helena Fibingerová is the world and European record holder in the event, with a distance of 22.50 m, set at the 1977 championships.

Records before the 2025 European Athletics Indoor Championships
Record	Athlete (nation)	Distance (m)	Location	Date
World record	Helena Fibingerová (TCH)	22.50	Jablonec, Czechoslovakia	19 February 1977
European record	Helena Fibingerová (TCH)	22.50	Jablonec, Czechoslovakia	19 February 1977
Championship record	Helena Fibingerová (TCH)	22.50	Jablonec, Czechoslovakia	19 February 1977
World leading	Sarah Mitton (CAN)	20.68	Karlsruhe, Germany	7 February 2025
European leading	Yemisi Ogunleye (GER)	20.27	Dortmund, Germany	21 February 2025

== Qualification ==
For the women's shot put, the qualification period runs from 25 February 2024 until 23 February 2025. Athletes can qualify by achieving the entry standards of 18.90 m or by virtue of their World Athletics Ranking for the event. There is a target number of 18 athletes.

== Rounds ==
=== Qualification ===
The qualifying round was held on 8 March, starting at 10:50 (UTC+1) in the morning. All athletes meeting the Qualification Standard of 18.80 m (Q) or at least 8 best performers (q) advanced to the final.

Results of the qualification round
Rank	Athlete	Nation	#1	#2	#3	Result	Notes	PB
1	Jessica Schilder	Netherlands	19.92			19.92	Q	20.33
2	Yemisi Ogunleye	Germany	17.10	18.95		18.95	Q	20.27
3	Jessica Inchude	Portugal	18.47	18.85		18.85	Q	19.18
4	Auriol Dongmo	Portugal	18.40	18.64	18.50	18.64	q	20.43
5	Fanny Roos	Sweden	18.56	x	x	18.56	q	19.42
6	Katharina Maisch	Germany	17.58	18.12	18.48	18.48	q	19.10
7	Jorinde van Klinken	Netherlands	17.78	x	18.33	18.33	q	19.57
8	Alina Kenzel	Germany	18.16	18.31	18.05	18.31	q	18.69
9	Sara Lennman	Sweden	17.57	17.80	x	17.80		18.39
10	Eliana Bandeira	Portugal	17.02	17.44	17.24	17.44		18.49
11	Senja Mäkitörmä	Finland	16.24	17.34	17.08	17.34		17.74
12	Dimitriana Bezede	Moldova	16.48	16.71	17.04	17.04		18.83
13	Miryam Mazenauer	Switzerland	17.04	16.70	x	17.04		17.12
14	Emilia Kangas	Finland	16.63	x	16.93	16.93		17.60
15	Renáta Beregszászi	Hungary	16.69	16.76	x	16.76	=PB	16.76
16	Erna Sóley Gunnarsdóttir	Iceland	16.60	16.74	x	16.74		17.92
17	Zuzanna Maślana	Poland	15.84	16.49	16.51	16.51		17.40
18	Serena Vincent	Great Britain	16.07	x	15.52	16.07		17.78

=== Final ===
The final was held on 9 March, starting at 17:52 (UTC+1) in the afternoon.

Rank	Athlete	Nation	#1	#2	#3	#4	#5	#6	Result	Notes
1st place, gold medalist(s)	Jessica Schilder	Netherlands	19.97	19.97	20.24	19.64	20.69	20.37	20.69	WL, NR
2nd place, silver medalist(s)	Yemisi Ogunleye	Germany	18.61	19.56	x	x	x	x	19.56	
3rd place, bronze medalist(s)	Auriol Dongmo	Portugal	19.12	19.26	x	x	19.06	18.90	19.26	SB
4	Fanny Roos	Sweden	18.72	18.78	18.74	18.42	18.55	19.11	19.11	SB
5	Jessica Inchude	Portugal	18.87	18.91	x	x	x	x	18.91	
6	Alina Kenzel	Germany	18.18	18.18	18.25	18.70	18.60	18.89	18.89	PB
7	Katharina Maisch	Germany	18.11	x	x	18.67	x	x	18.67	
8	Jorinde van Klinken	Netherlands	17.69	x	18.30	x	18.41	x	18.41	
