= 2022 European Athletics Championships – Women's shot put =

Women's shot put at the 2022 European Athletics Championships
- Venue: Olympiastadion
- Location: Munich
- Dates: August 15
- Competitors: 25 from 13 nations
- Winning distance: 20.24 m

Medalists
gold medal	Jessica Schilder	Netherlands
silver medal	Auriol Dongmo	Portugal
bronze medal	Jorinde van Klinken	Netherlands

The women's shot put at the 2022 European Athletics Championships took place at the Olympiastadion on 15 August.

== Records ==
Standing records prior to the 2022 European Athletics Championships
World record	Natalya Lisovskaya (URS)	22.63 m	Moscow, Soviet Union	7 June 1987
European record	Natalya Lisovskaya (URS)	22.63 m	Moscow, Soviet Union	7 June 1987
Championship record	Vita Pavlysh (UKR)	21.69 m	Budapest, Hungary	20 August 1998
World Leading	Chase Ealey (USA)	20.51 m	Eugene, United States	26 June 2022
Europe Leading	Jessica Schilder (NED)	19.84 m	Chorzów, Poland	6 August 2022

== Schedule ==
Date	Time	Round
15 August 2022	11:20	Qualification
15 August 2022	20:38	Final

All times are local times (UTC+2)

== Results ==
=== Qualification ===
Qualification: 18.60 m (Q) or best 12 performers (q)

Rank	Group	Name	Nationality	#1	#2	#3	Result	Note
1	A	Auriol Dongmo	Portugal	19.32			19.32	Q
2	B	Jessica Schilder	Netherlands	x	18.31	18.95	18.95	Q
3	B	Katharina Maisch	Germany	18.44	x	18.65	18.65	Q
4	A	Jorinde van Klinken	Netherlands	18.39	18.62		18.62	Q
5	A	Sara Gambetta	Germany	18.53	17.92	18.31	18.53	q
6	A	Axelina Johansson	Sweden	16.92	17.97	x	17.97	q
7	A	Julia Ritter	Germany	17.52	17.80	17.68	17.80	q
8	B	Fanny Roos	Sweden	17.43	17.79	x	17.79	q
9	A	Dimitriana Bezede	Moldova	17.53	17.76	x	17.76	q
10	B	María Belén Toimil	Spain	17.09	x	17.72	17.72	q
11	B	Jessica Inchude	Portugal	17.18	17.64	17.38	17.64	q
12	B	Sophie McKinna	Great Britain	17.33	16.86	15.87	17.33	q
13	A	Benthe König	Netherlands	16.90	x	17.27	17.27	
14	B	Klaudia Kardasz	Poland	17.27	x	x	17.27	
15	A	Amelia Strickler	Great Britain	16.62	16.55	17.20	17.20	
16	B	Divine Oladipo	Great Britain	x	17.16	16.81	17.16	
17	B	Eveliina Rouvali	Finland	x	16.49	17.07	17.07	
18	B	Sara Lennman	Sweden	16.92	16.95	16.76	16.95	
19	A	Senja Mäkitörmä	Finland	x	16.71	16.94	16.94	
20	A	Paulina Guba	Poland	16.45	x	16.66	16.66	
21	A	Emel Dereli	Turkey	16.56	–	–	16.56	
22	B	Erna Sóley Gunnarsdóttir	Iceland	15.89	16.41	x	16.41	
23	B	Pınar Akyol	Turkey	14.69	15.67	15.89	15.89	
24	A	Sopo Shatirishvili	Georgia	15.08	15.52	15.36	15.52	
	A	Markéta Červenková	Czech Republic	–	–	–	NM	

=== Final ===
The final was started on 15 August at 20:38.

Rank	Name	Nationality	#1	#2	#3	#4	#5	#6	Result	Note
1st place, gold medalist(s)	Jessica Schilder	Netherlands	19.47	20.24	19.18	19.24	19.12	19.13	20.24	EL, NR
2nd place, silver medalist(s)	Auriol Dongmo	Portugal	19.29	19.82	19.01	x	19.46	19.52	19.82	NR
3rd place, bronze medalist(s)	Jorinde van Klinken	Netherlands	17.03	18.94	16.99	x	18.83	18.20	18.94	
4	Fanny Roos	Sweden	18.35	x	18.30	x	17.84	18.55	18.55	
5	Sara Gambetta	Germany	18.17	18.48	18.21	18.40	18.24	17.61	18.48	
6	Julia Ritter	Germany	18.29	18.00	18.07	18.14	18.24	18.16	18.29	
7	Axelina Johansson	Sweden	18.04	17.42	17.75	17.37	17.60	16.98	18.04	
8	Katharina Maisch	Germany	18.01	x	x	17.80	x	17.13	18.01	
9	Jessica Inchude	Portugal	17.24	x	17.93				17.93	
10	María Belén Toimil	Spain	17.40	17.86	17.21				17.86	
11	Dimitriana Bezede	Moldova	16.98	x	x				16.98	
12	Sophie McKinna	Great Britain	16.29	15.63	x				16.29	
