= 2018 European Athletics Championships – Women's shot put =

Women's shot put at the 2018 European Athletics Championships
- Venue: Olympic Stadium
- Location: Berlin
- Dates: August 7 (qualification); August 8 (final)
- Competitors: 23 from 14 nations
- Winning distance: 19.33

Medalists
gold medal	Paulina Guba	Poland
silver medal	Christina Schwanitz	Germany
bronze medal	Aliona Dubitskaya	Belarus

The women's shot put at the 2018 European Athletics Championships took place at the Olympic Stadium on 7 and 8 August.

== Records ==
Standing records prior to the 2018 European Athletics Championships
World record	Natalya Lisovskaya (URS)	22.63 m	Moscow, Soviet Union	7 June 1987
European record	Natalya Lisovskaya (URS)	22.63 m	Moscow, Soviet Union	7 June 1987
Championship record	Vita Pavlysh (UKR)	21.69 m	Budapest, Hungary	20 August 1998
World Leading	Gong Lijiao (CHN)	20.38 m	Guiyang, China	17 June 2018
Europe Leading	Christina Schwanitz (GER)	19.78 m	Biberach an der Riss, Germany	9 July 2018

== Schedule ==
Date	Time	Round
7 August 2018	10:10	Qualification
8 August 2018	20:09	Final

All times are local times (UTC+2)

== Results ==
=== Qualification ===
Qualification: 17.20 m (Q) or best 12 performers (q).

Rank	Group	Name	Nationality	#1	#2	#3	Result	Note
1	B	Christina Schwanitz	Germany	18.83			18.83	Q
2	A	Aliona Dubitskaya	Belarus	18.67			18.67	Q
3	A	Paulina Guba	Poland	18.66			18.66	Q
4	B	Klaudia Kardasz	Poland	17.15	18.00		18.00	Q
5	A	Radoslava Mavrodieva	Bulgaria	x	17.87		17.87	Q
6	A	Fanny Roos	Sweden	17.71			17.71	Q
7	A	Alina Kenzel	Germany	17.13	17.46		17.46	Q
8	B	Viktoryia Kolb	Belarus	17.36			17.36	Q
9	B	Amelia Strickler	Great Britain	16.15	17.31		17.31	Q, PB
10	B	Sophie McKinna	Great Britain	17.24			17.24	Q
11	A	Sara Gambetta	Germany	17.23			17.23	Q
12	B	Alena Abramchuk	Belarus	16.86	17.17	17.12	17.17	q
13	B	Úrsula Ruiz	Spain	17.06	x	16.77	17.06	SB
14	A	Melissa Boekelman	Netherlands	16.90	x	16.78	16.90	
15	B	Dimitriana Surdu	Moldova	16.17	16.66	16.87	16.87	
16	A	Olha Holodna	Ukraine	x	16.69	x	16.69	
17	A	Markéta Červenková	Czech Republic	15.71	16.19	16.62	16.62	
18	B	Viktoriya Klochko	Ukraine	15.05	15.96	16.27	16.27	
19	B	Frida Åkerström	Sweden	16.17	x	16.20	16.20	
20	B	Senja Mäkitörmä	Finland	16.04	15.50	x	16.04	
21	A	Divine Oladipo	Great Britain	15.28	15.78	15.35	15.78	
22	A	Eliana Bandeira	Portugal	15.09	x	15.18	15.18	
23	A	Ieva Zarankaitė	Lithuania	15.13	x	14.81	15.13	

=== Final ===
Rank	Athlete	Nationality	#1	#2	#3	#4	#5	#6	Result	Notes
1st place, gold medalist(s)	Paulina Guba	Poland	18.77	18.77	x	18.49	19.02	19.33	19.33	
2nd place, silver medalist(s)	Christina Schwanitz	Germany	19.19	19.08	x	18.86	x	18.98	19.19	
3rd place, bronze medalist(s)	Aliona Dubitskaya	Belarus	18.59	18.75	18.57	x	18.81	x	18.81	
4	Klaudia Kardasz	Poland	16.82	17.96	x	x	18.38	18.48	18.48	NU23R
5	Sara Gambetta	Germany	16.44	18.09	17.53	17.74	17.39	18.13	18.13	SB
6	Radoslava Mavrodieva	Bulgaria	18.03	x	x	17.86	x	x	18.03	
7	Sophie McKinna	Great Britain	17.58	17.29	17.03	17.65	17.29	17.69	17.69	
8	Viktoryia Kolb	Belarus	16.93	17.50	17.30	x	17.04	17.27	17.50	
9	Alina Kenzel	Germany	17.26	x	x				17.26	
10	Amelia Strickler	Great Britain	16.43	16.13	17.15				17.15	
11	Fanny Roos	Sweden	17.03	17.09	16.90				17.09	
12	Alena Abramchuk	Belarus	16.90	x	x				16.90	
