= 2023 European Athletics Indoor Championships – Women's shot put =

Women's shot put at the 2023 European Athletics Indoor Championships
- Venue: Ataköy Athletics Arena
- Location: Istanbul, Turkey
- Dates: 2 March 2023 (qualification); 3 March 2023 (final)
- Competitors: 16 from 10 nations
- Winning mark: 19.76 m EL

Medalists
gold medal	Auriol Dongmo	Portugal
silver medal	Sara Gambetta	Germany
bronze medal	Fanny Roos	Sweden

The women's shot put event at the 2023 European Athletics Indoor Championships was held on 2 March at 20:40 (qualification) and on 3 March at 20:53 (final) local time.

== Records ==
Standing records prior to the 2023 European Athletics Indoor Championships
World record	Helena Fibingerová (CZE)	22.50	Jablonec nad Nisou, Czechoslovakia	19 February 1977
European record	Helena Fibingerová (CZE)	22.50	Jablonec nad Nisou, Czechoslovakia	19 February 1977
Championship record	Helena Fibingerová (CZE)	22.50	Jablonec nad Nisou, Czechoslovakia	19 February 1977
World Leading	Chase Ealey (USA)	20.03	New York City, United States	11 February 2023
European Leading	Jorinde van Klinken (NED)	19.57	Albuquerque, United States	11 February 2023

== Results ==
=== Qualification ===
Qualification: Qualifying performance 18.50 (Q) or at least 8 best performers (q) advance to the Final.

Rank	Athlete	Nationality	#1	#2	#3	Result	Note
1	Jessica Schilder	Netherlands	19.18			19.18	Q
2	Auriol Dongmo	Portugal	18.51			18.51	Q
3	Fanny Roos	Sweden	18.35	x	x	18.35	q
4	Sara Gambetta	Germany	17.89	18.26	18.33	18.33	q
5	Julia Ritter	Germany	17.81	18.05	17.77	18.05	SB, q
6	Anita Márton	Hungary	16.99	17.99	17.50	17.99	q
7	Jessica Inchude	Portugal	17.92	x	x	17.92	q
8	Dimitriana Bezede	Moldova	16.52	17.00	17.90	17.90	SB, q
9	Sara Lennman	Sweden	17.82	17.62	17.79	17.82	
10	Katharina Maisch	Germany	17.44	x	x	17.44	
11	Benthe König	Netherlands	16.77	18.60	17.23	17.23	
12	Eliana Bandeira	Portugal	x	x	17.23	17.23	
13	María Belén Toimil	Spain	16.26	16.88	x	16.88	
14	Eveliina Rouvali	Finland	15.64	16.24	16.26	16.26	
15	Jolien Boumkwo	Belgium	15.82	16.18	15.66	16.18	
16	Sopo Shatirishvili	Georgia	14.69	14.55	15.08	15.08	SB

=== Final ===
Rank	Athlete	Nationality	#1	#2	#3	#4	#5	#6	Result	Note
1st place, gold medalist(s)	Auriol Dongmo	Portugal	19.63	18.68	19.76	x	19.38	19.62	19.76	EL
2nd place, silver medalist(s)	Sara Gambetta	Germany	18.26	x	18.20	18.16	18.83	18.31	18.83	SB
3rd place, bronze medalist(s)	Fanny Roos	Sweden	17.50	x	17.71	17.71	x	18.42	18.42	
4	Jessica Inchude	Portugal	x	18.12	18.06	18.33	x	18.29	18.33	
5	Jessica Schilder	Netherlands	18.10	18.29	x	18.21	x	x	18.29	
6	Anita Márton	Hungary	16.64	17.82	18.28	17.68	17.88	x	18.28	SB
7	Dimitriana Bezede	Moldova	17.98	x	x	x	x	x	17.98	SB
8	Julia Ritter	Germany	17.41	17.89	x	x	x	x	17.89	
