= Athletics at the 2020 Summer Olympics – Women's shot put =

Women's shot put at the Games of the XXXII Olympiad
- Olympic Athletics
- Venue: Japan National Stadium
- Dates: 30 July 2021 (qualifying); 1 August 2021 (final)
- Competitors: 32 from 22 nations
- Winning distance: 20.58 m

Medalists
1st place, gold medalist(s)		Gong Lijiao	China
2nd place, silver medalist(s)		Raven Saunders	United States
3rd place, bronze medalist(s)		Valerie Adams	New Zealand

The women's shot put event at the 2020 Summer Olympics took place on 30 July and 1 August 2021 at the Japan National Stadium. Approximately 35 athletes are expected to compete; the exact number will depend on how many nations use universality places to enter athletes in addition to the 32 qualifying through distance or ranking (2 universality places were used in 2016).

== Summary ==
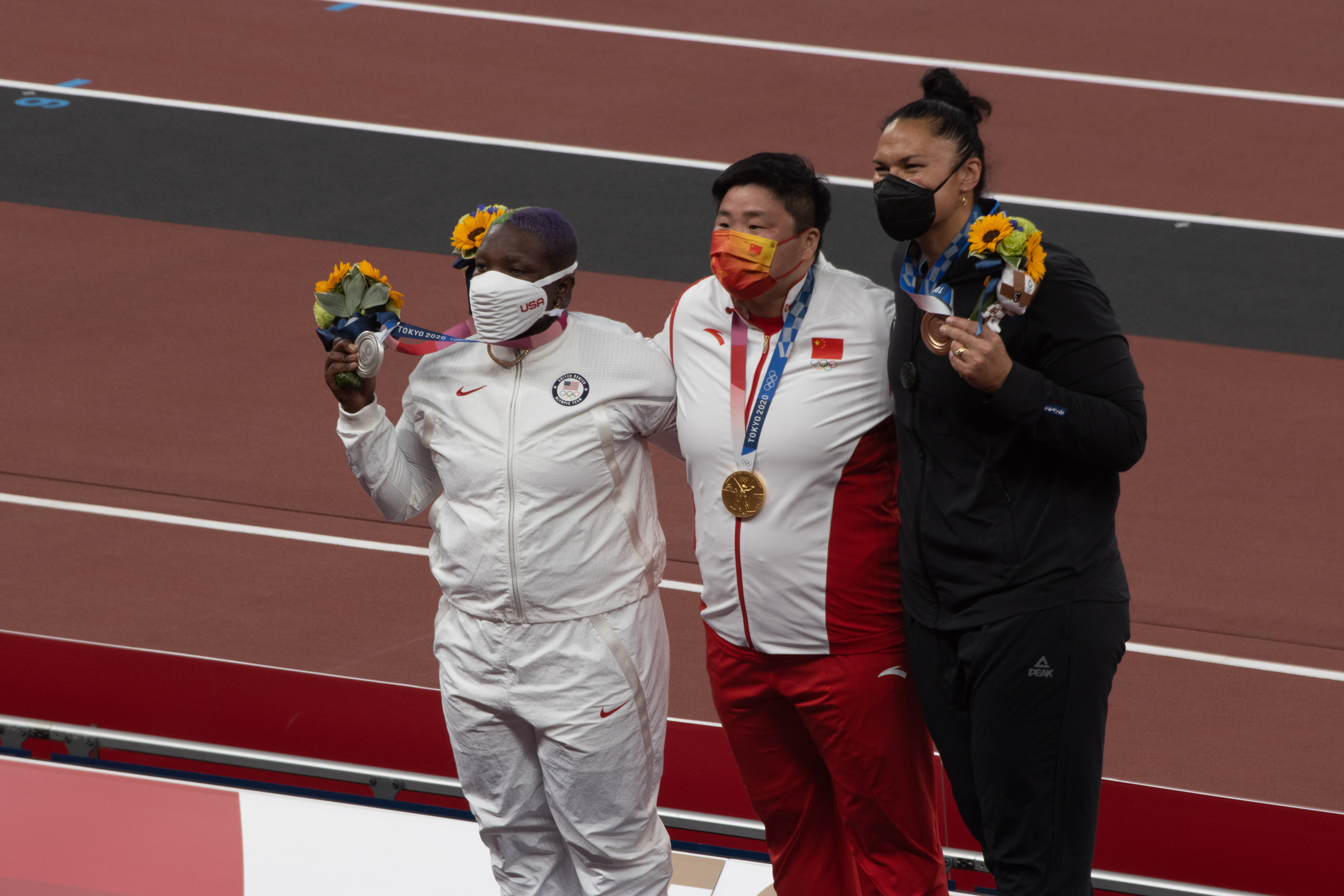
Tokyo 2020 Olympic Games women's shot put podium, from left: silver medalist Raven Saunders, gold medalist Lijao Gong and bronze medalist Valerie Adams

On the first throw of the final Raven Saunders dropped a 19.65m, which proved sufficient to nail down silver. As the fifth thrower, Gong Lijao's 19.95m would prove to be better than anyone else could muster. The only other thrower over 19 metres in the first round was Auriol Dongmo with 19.29m. In the second round, two time Olympic Champion, in her fifth Olympics, Valerie Adams tossed 19.49m to move into third and the medal order had been decided. Adams threw her best in the third round with a 19.62m, followed shortly by Gong improving to 19.98m. In the fourth round, Dongmo made her best effort 19.57m, but not enough to pass Adams. In the fifth round, Saunders threw her best 19.79m, but on the next throw, Gong hit 20.53 to extend her lead. Saunders made one more effort in the final round, her shot landing well beyond the 20 meter tape shortly after her foot landed over the toe board making it a foul. Relaxed as the winner, Gong followed with her best effort, 20.58 m (67 ft 6 in) to take gold.

== Background ==
This will be the 19th appearance of the event, having appeared at every Summer Olympics since 1948.

== Qualification ==
A National Olympic Committee (NOC) could enter up to 3 qualified athletes in the women's shot put event if all athletes meet the entry standard or qualify by ranking during the qualifying period. (The limit of 3 has been in place since the 1930 Olympic Congress.) The qualifying standard is 18.50 metres. This standard was "set for the sole purpose of qualifying athletes with exceptional performances unable to qualify through the IAAF World Rankings pathway." The world rankings, based on the average of the best five results for the athlete over the qualifying period and weighted by the importance of the meet, will then be used to qualify athletes until the cap of 32 is reached.

The qualifying period was originally from 1 May 2019 to 29 June 2020. Due to the COVID-19 pandemic, the period was suspended from 6 April 2020 to 30 November 2020, with the end date extended to 29 June 2021. The world rankings period start date was also changed from 1 May 2019 to 30 June 2020; athletes who had met the qualifying standard during that time were still qualified, but those using world rankings would not be able to count performances during that time. The qualifying time standards could be obtained in various meets during the given period that have the approval of the IAAF. Both outdoor and indoor meets are eligible. The most recent Area Championships may be counted in the ranking, even if not during the qualifying period.

NOCs can also use their universality place—each NOC can enter one female athlete regardless of time if they had no female athletes meeting the entry standard for an athletics event—in the shot put.

== Competition format ==
The 2020 competition will continue to use the two-round format with divided final introduced in 1936. The qualifying round gives each competitor three throws to achieve a qualifying distance (not yet set; 2016 used 18.40 metres); if fewer than 12 women do so, the top 12 will advance. The final provides each thrower with three throws; the top eight throwers receive an additional three throws for a total of six, with the best to count (qualifying round throws are not considered for the final).

== Records ==
Prior to this competition, the existing world, Olympic, and area records are as follows.

World record	Natalya Lisovskaya (URS)	22.63	Moscow, Soviet Union	7 June 1987
Olympic record	Ilona Slupianek (GDR)	22.41	Moscow, Soviet Union	24 July 1980

Area	Distance (m)	Athlete	Nation
Africa (records)	18.43	Vivian Chukwuemeka	Nigeria
Asia (records)	21.76	Li Meisu	China
Europe (records)	22.63 WR	Natalya Lisovskaya	Soviet Union
North, Central America and the Caribbean (records)	20.96	Belsy Laza	Cuba
Oceania (records)	21.24	Valerie Adams	New Zealand
South America (records)	19.30	Elisângela Adriano	Brazil

== Schedule ==
All times are Japan Standard Time (UTC+9)

The women's shot put will take place over two separate days.

Date	Time	Round
Friday, 30 July 2021	19:00	Qualifying
Sunday, 1 August 2021	9:10	Final

== Results ==
=== Qualifying ===
Qualification Rules: Qualifying performance 18.80 (Q) or at least 12 best performers (q) advance to the Final.

Rank	Group	Athlete	Nation	1	2	3	Distance	Notes
1	B	Gong Lijiao	China	19.46	–	–	19.46	Q
2	B	Song Jiayuan	China	x	19.23	–	19.23	Q
3	A	Raven Saunders	United States	x	19.22	–	19.22	Q
4	A	Fanny Roos	Sweden	19.01	–	–	19.01	Q
5	A	Aliona Dubitskaya	Belarus	18.61	x	18.89	18.89	Q
6	B	Valerie Adams	New Zealand	18.75	18.59	18.83	18.83	Q
7	A	Gao Yang	China	18.51	18.80	–	18.80	Q, SB
7	B	Auriol Dongmo	Portugal	18.80	–	–	18.80	Q
9	A	Portious Warren	Trinidad and Tobago	18.21	18.23	18.75	18.75	q, PB
9	A	Jessica Ramsey	United States	x	x	18.75	18.75	q
11	A	Maddi Wesche	New Zealand	18.65	16.80	18.53	18.65	q, PB
12	B	Sara Gambetta	Germany	x	18.57	17.35	18.57	q
13	B	Danniel Thomas-Dodd	Jamaica	x	18.37	18.24	18.37	
14	A	Christina Schwanitz	Germany	17.51	17.72	18.08	18.08	
15	A	Katharina Maisch	Germany	16.92	17.89	17.72	17.89	
16	B	Emel Dereli	Turkey	x	17.81	17.69	17.81	
16	B	Sophie McKinna	Great Britain	17.81	x	17.60	17.81	
18	A	Klaudia Kardasz	Poland	x	17.29	17.76	17.76	
19	A	Jessica Schilder	Netherlands	16.69	17.74	16.82	17.74	
20	B	Adelaide Aquilla	United States	17.38	17.68	16.62	17.68	
21	B	Anita Márton	Hungary	17.42	17.59	x	17.59	SB
22	A	Lloydricia Cameron	Jamaica	17.29	x	17.43	17.43	
23	A	María Belén Toimil	Spain	x	x	17.38	17.38	
24	B	Markéta Červenková	Czech Republic	17.33	x	17.05	17.33	
25	B	Ahymara Espinoza	Venezuela	17.17	16.74	16.50	17.17	
26	A	Olha Golodna	Ukraine	16.07	17.15	17.08	17.15	
27	B	Paulina Guba	Poland	x	16.98	16.96	16.98	
28	B	Sarah Mitton	Canada	16.62	x	x	16.62	
29	A	Dimitriana Surdu	Moldova	15.61	16.55	x	16.55	
30	B	Geisa Arcanjo	Brazil	16.46	x	x	16.46	
31	B	Sopo Shatirishvili	Georgia	14.91	15.31	x	15.31	
–	A	Brittany Crew	Canada	x	x	x	—	NM

=== Final ===
Rank	Athlete	Nation	1	2	3	4	5	6	Distance	Notes
1st place, gold medalist(s)	Gong Lijiao	China	19.95	x	19.98	19.80	20.53	20.58	20.58	PB
2nd place, silver medalist(s)	Raven Saunders	United States	19.65	x	19.62	19.49	19.79	x	19.79	
3rd place, bronze medalist(s)	Valerie Adams	New Zealand	18.62	19.49	19.62	x	x	18.76	19.62	
4	Auriol Dongmo	Portugal	19.29	18.95	19.17	19.57	19.45	19.45	19.57	
5	Song Jiayuan	China	18.11	19.14	18.74	x	x	18.26	19.14	
6	Maddi Wesche	New Zealand	17.45	18.42	18.98	18.18	18.50	18.47	18.98	PB
7	Fanny Roos	Sweden	17.99	18.02	18.91	x	18.72	18.76	18.91	
8	Sara Gambetta	Germany	18.37	18.04	18.88	x	18.48	18.38	18.88	PB
9	Aliona Dubitskaya	Belarus	17.76	18.57	18.73	Did not advance			18.73	
10	Gao Yang	China	18.45	18.67	18.51	Did not advance			18.67	
11	Portious Warren	Trinidad and Tobago	18.01	18.01	18.32	Did not advance			18.32	
	Jessica Ramsey	United States	x	x	x	Did not advance			−	NM
