= 2024 European Athletics Championships – Women's shot put =

Women's shot put at the 2024 European Athletics Championships
- Venue: Stadio Olimpico
- Location: Rome
- Dates: 7 June
- Competitors: 25 from 14 nations
- Winning distance: 18.77 m

Medalists
gold medal	Jessica Schilder	Netherlands
silver medal	Jorinde van Klinken	Netherlands
bronze medal	Yemisi Ogunleye	Germany

The women's shot put at the 2024 European Athletics Championships took place at the Stadio Olimpico on 7 June

== Records ==
Standing records prior to the 2024 European Athletics Championships
World record	Natalya Lisovskaya (URS)	22.63 m	Moscow, Soviet Union	7 June 1987
European record	Natalya Lisovskaya (URS)	22.63 m	Moscow, Soviet Union	7 June 1987
Championship record	Vita Pavlysh (UKR)	21.69 m	Budapest, Hungary	20 August 1998
World Leading	Sarah Mitton (CAN)	20.68 m	Fleetwood, United States	11 May 2024
Europe Leading	Jessica Schilder (NED)	20.31 m	Apeldoorn, Netherlands	17 February 2024

== Schedule ==
Date	Time	Round
7 June 2024	10:03	Qualification
7 June 2024	21:33	Final

All times are local times (UTC+2)

== Results ==
=== Qualification ===
Qualification: 18.00 m (Q) or best 12 performers (q)

Rank	Group	Name	Nationality	#1	#2	#3	Result	Note
1	B	Fanny Roos	Sweden	17.87	18.70		18.70	Q
2	B	Alina Kenzel	Germany	17.61	18.42		18.42	Q
3	B	Yemisi Ogunleye	Germany	18.40			18.40	Q
4	A	Jessica Schilder	Netherlands	18.32			18.32	Q
5	A	Sara Lennman	Sweden	17.65	X	18.16	18.16	Q
6	A	Jessica Inchude	Portugal	18.17			18.17	Q
7	A	Jorinde van Klinken	Netherlands	18.13			18.13	Q
8	A	Julia Ritter	Germany	17.86	18.06		18.06	Q
9	B	Klaudia Kardasz	Poland	x	17.76	16.78	17.76	q
10	B	María Belén Toimil	Spain	17.76	x	x	17.76	q
11	A	Emel Dereli	Turkey	17.01	17.66	16.94	17.66	q
12	A	Emilia Kangas	Finland	16.99	x	17.02	17.02	q
13	B	Benthe König	Netherlands	16.94	x	17.02	17.02	
14	A	Dimitriana Bezede	Moldova	16.80	x	x	16.80	
15	B	Eliana Bandeira	Portugal	16.76	16.74	x	16.76	
16	B	Miryam Mazenauer	Switzerland	x	16.69	x	16.69	
17	B	Senja Mäkitörmä	Finland	16.27	16.25	16.45	16.45	
18	A	Eveliina Rouvali	Finland	16.34	x	16.03	16.34	
19	B	Erna Sóley Gunnarsdóttir	Iceland	16.26	16.20	16.19	16.26	
20	A	Zuzanna Maślana	Poland	15.92	16.22	15.76	16.22	
21	B	Violetta Veiland	Hungary	15.72	x	x	15.72	
22	A	Lucija Leko	Croatia	14.61	x	15.61	15.61	
23	B	Maria Magkoulia	Greece	15.24	15.31	14.97	15.31	
24	A	Renáta Beregszászi	Hungary	14.71	x	15.06	15.06	
25	A	Anastasia Ntragkomirova	Greece	14.43	13.99	14.82	14.82	

=== Final ===
The final was started on 7 June at 21:33.

Rank	Name	Nationality	#1	#2	#3	#4	#5	#6	Result	Note
1st place, gold medalist(s)	Jessica Schilder	Netherlands	18.77	18.13	x	18.62	x	x	18.77	
2nd place, silver medalist(s)	Jorinde van Klinken	Netherlands	18.13	18.67	18.21	18.40	18.19	18.23	18.67	SB
3rd place, bronze medalist(s)	Yemisi Ogunleye	Germany	17.04	x	17.87	16.32	18.62	x	18.62	
4	Alina Kenzel	Germany	18.00	17.98	x	18.18	18.22	18.55	18.55	
5	María Belén Toimil	Spain	17.00	18.43	17.61	17.99	x	17.77	18.43	
6	Fanny Roos	Sweden	17.62	18.26	x	x	x	x	18.26	
7	Julia Ritter	Germany	18.14	17.83	17.98	x	18.18	18.18	18.18	
8	Sara Lennman	Sweden	17.22	17.20	17.96	17.93	18.16	x	18.16	
9	Jessica Inchude	Portugal	17.56	17.77	17.81				17.81	
10	Klaudia Kardasz	Poland	17.66	17.28	x				17.66	
11	Emel Dereli	Turkey	17.52	17.34	x				17.52	
12	Emilia Kangas	Finland	x	16.74	x				16.74	
