= 2022 World Athletics Indoor Championships – Women's shot put =

Women's shot put at the 2022 World Athletics Indoor Championships
- Venue: Štark Arena
- Dates: 18 March
- Competitors: 15 from 11 nations
- Winning distance: 20.43

Medalists
gold medal	Auriol Dongmo	Portugal
silver medal	Chase Ealey	United States
bronze medal	Jessica Schilder	Netherlands

The women's shot put at the 2022 World Athletics Indoor Championships took place on 18 March 2022.

== Summary ==
Auriol Dongmo came into the competition as the world leader; her 19.90 was the longest indoor throw in the world since 2016. Her throw had displaced Maggie Ewen's 19.79 from the same position.

Four throws into the event, Jessica Schilder got the first 19 metre throw with 19.01. Four more throws later, Dongmo added a foot to that with her 19.32m. A couple of throws later, Chase Ealey moved into third with 18.65. Three more throws and Fanny Roos did her one silly centimeter longer, 18.66. In the second round, Danniel Thomas-Dodd moved up with 18.77. Schilder exactly duplicated her 19.01, so Dongmo exactly duplicated her 19.32. Ealey moved into second place with 19.11. In the third round, Roos's 19.22 put her into second place. In the fourth round, Ewen moved into third with 19.15, which lasted one throw until Schilder took the lead with 19.46. When Thomas-Dodd dropped 19.12, Ealey had been dropped to sixth place. She responded with 20.21, a new best throw in the last 6 years, equalling Michelle Carter's gold medal winning throw from 2016 which was also the North American Continental Record. Her world leading and event leading status lasted two more throws until Dongmo unleashed the winner 20.43 m (67 ft 1/4 in). In the sixth round, only Schilder was able to improve, her 19.48 confirmed the bronze medal.

== Results ==
The final was started at 18:50.

Rank	Athlete	Nationality	#1	#2	#3	#4	#5	#6	Result	Notes
1st place, gold medalist(s)	Auriol Dongmo	Portugal	19.32	19.32	x	x	20.43	x	20.43	WL NR
2nd place, silver medalist(s)	Chase Ealey	United States	18.65	19.11	18.88	18.62	20.21	x	20.21	=AR
3rd place, bronze medalist(s)	Jessica Schilder	Netherlands	19.01	19.01	18.98	19.46	18.98	19.48	19.48	
4	Fanny Roos	Sweden	18.66	x	19.22	x	17.76	18.24	19.22	SB
5	Maggie Ewen	United States	18.16	18.34	x	19.15	x	x	19.15	
6	Danniel Thomas-Dodd	Jamaica	x	18.77	x	18.38	19.12	x	19.12	SB
7	Sarah Mitton	Canada	x	18.20	x	x	x	19.02	19.02	
8	Sophie McKinna	Great Britain	18.40	18.62	x	x	17.97	18.19	18.62	
9	Sara Gambetta	Germany	18.16	18.17	17.66				18.17	
10	Dimitriana Bezede	Moldova	17.64	x	18.07				18.07	
11	Katharina Maisch	Germany	17.83	x	x				17.83	
12	Jessica Inchude	Portugal	17.56	17.27	x				17.56	
13	Amelia Strickler	Great Britain	16.78	16.73	16.86				16.86	
14	Lívia Avancini	Brazil	16.52	16.43	16.85				16.85	
15	Ivana Gallardo	Chile	15.06	16.08	15.81				16.08	
