= 2026 European Athletics Championships – Women's shot put =

Women's shot put at the 2026 European Athletics Championships
- Venue: Alexander Stadium
- Location: Birmingham, United Kingdom
- Dates: 10 August 2026
- Competitors: 27 from 14 nations
- Winning distance: 20.73 m

Medalists
gold medal	Jessica Schilder	Netherlands
silver medal	Jorinde van Klinken	Netherlands
bronze medal	Yemisi Mabry	Germany

The women's shot put at the 2026 European Athletics Championships took place over two rounds at the Alexander Stadium in Birmingham, United Kingdom, on 10 August 2026.

== Background ==
Records before the 2026 European Athletics Championships
Record	Athlete (nation)	Distance	Location	Date
World record	Natalya Lisovskaya (URS)	22.63 m	Moscow, Soviet Union	7 June 1987
European record	Natalya Lisovskaya (URS)	22.63 m	Moscow, Soviet Union	7 June 1987
Championship record	Vita Pavlysh (UKR)	21.69 m	Budapest, Hungary	20 August 1998
World leading	Jessica Schilder (NED)	21.09 m	Shaoxing, China	16 May 2026
European leading	Jessica Schilder (NED)	21.09 m	Shaoxing, China	16 May 2026

== Qualification ==
For the women's shot put, the qualification period was from 27 July 2025 to 26 July 2026. Athletes qualified by achieving the entry standard of 20.80 m or better, by wildcard for the 2024 European Athletics Champion, or by their position on the World Athletics Rankings for the event. The target number was 30 athletes, eventually only 27 qualified

Qualification standings per 31 July 2026
QP	CP	Country	Athlete	PB	SB	Status	Details
1	1	Netherlands	Jessica Schilder	21.09	21.09	Qualified by Wild Card	Defending European Champion
2	1	Germany	Yemisi Mabry	20.37	20.37	Qualified by Entry Standard	20.37 - Helmut-Körnig-Halle, Dortmund (GER) (i) - 27 FEB 2026
3	1	Sweden	Axelina Johansson	19.97	19.97	Qualified by Entry Standard	19.97 - Ed Weir Outdoor Track, Lincoln, NE (USA) - 16 MAY 2026
4	2	Sweden	Fanny Roos	19.70	19.70	Qualified by Entry Standard	19.70 - Hayward Field, Eugene, OR (USA) - 04 JUL 2026
5	1	Portugal	Jessica Inchude	19.62	19.62	Qualified by Entry Standard	19.62 - Estadio Universitario, Lisboa (POR) - 26 JUL 2026
6	2	Netherlands	Jorinde van Klinken	19.57	19.34	Qualified by Entry Standard	19.34 - FBK Stadium, Hengelo (NED) - 21 JUN 2026
7	2	Portugal	Auriol Dongmo	20.43	19.17	Qualified by Entry Standard	19.17 - Altice Forum, Braga (POR) (i) - 28 FEB 2026
8	2	Germany	Katharina Maisch	19.25	19.04	Qualified by Entry Standard	19.04 - Stadion Erzgebirgsblick, Gelenau (GER) - 07 JUN 2026
9	3	Portugal	Eliana Bandeira	18.95	18.95	Qualified by Entry Standard	18.95 - Market square, Białystok (POL) - 31 MAY 2026
10	3	Germany	Nina Chioma Ndubuisi	18.91	18.62	Qualified by Entry Standard	18.62 - Waldstadion, Walldorf (GER) - 19 JUL 2026
reserve	4	Germany	Alina Korecki	18.91	18.56	Qualified by Entry Standard	18.56 - Heinz-Steyer-Stadion, Dresden (GER) - 03 AUG 2025
11	1	Finland	Emilia Kangas	18.42	18.29	Qualified by Entry Standard	18.42 - Athletics Stadium, Beograd (SRB) - 07 AUG 2025
reserve	5	Germany	Julia Ritter	18.13	18.13	Qualified by World Rankings	14th - 1120 points
12	1	Spain	María Belén Toimil	18.80	17.80	Qualified by World Rankings	15th - 1118 points
13	3	Netherlands	Alida van Daalen	18.66	18.13	Qualified by World Rankings	16th - 1099 points
14	1	Switzerland	Miryam Mazenauer	17.55	17.32	Qualified by World Rankings	19th - 1081 points
15	2	Finland	Senja Mäkitörmä	17.76	17.52	Qualified by World Rankings	20th - 1079 points
16	1	Great Britain & N.I.	Serena Vincent	17.78	17.51	Qualified by World Rankings	21st - 1072 points
17	1	Czech Republic	Katrin Brzyszkowská	17.76	17.76	Qualified by World Rankings	23rd - 1060 points
18	1	Iceland	Erna Sóley Gunnarsdóttir	17.92	17.09	Qualified by World Rankings	24th - 1058 points
19	1	Poland	Zuzanna Maślana	17.40	17.23	Qualified by World Rankings	25th - 1054 points
20	1	Hungary	Renáta Beregszászi	17.10	17.10	Qualified by World Rankings	27th - 1052 points
21	1	Greece	Maria Rafailídou	16.80	16.80	Qualified by World Rankings	31st - 1032 points
22	1	Italy	Sara Verteramo	16.94	16.94	Qualified by World Rankings	36th - 1021 points
23	3	Finland	Minttu Laurila	16.52	16.52	Qualified by World Rankings	38th - 1013 points
24	2	Greece	Maria Magkoulia	17.00	17.00	Qualified by World Rankings	39th - 1011 points
25	2	Czech Republic	Martina Mazurová	16.60	16.34	Qualified by World Rankings	41st - 1004 points
26	3	Sweden	Victoria Wickman	16.35	16.35	Qualified by World Rankings	48th - 976 points
reserve	4	Sweden	Jonna Lundgren	16.22	16.22	Qualified by World Rankings	49th - 973 points
reserve	5	Sweden	Emilia Malmehed	16.31	16.31	Qualified by World Rankings	50th - 972 points
27	2	Italy	Anna Musci	16.47	16.47	Qualified by World Rankings	51st - 970 points

Bye to semi-finals	Reserve activated	Withdrawal / reserve unused

== Schedule ==
Date	Time	Round
10 August 2026	10:35	Qualification.
10 August 2026	19:03	Final

All times are local times (UTC+1)

== Results ==
=== Qualification ===
The qualification round was held on 10 August 2026, at 10:35 in the afternoon. All athletes meeting the Qualification Standard (Q) of 18.20 m or at least 12 best performers (q) advanced to the final.

==== Group A ====
Place	Athlete	Nation	Round			Result	Notes
Place	Athlete	Nation	#1	#2	#3	Result	Notes
1	Yemisi Mabry	Germany	19.25			19.25 m	Q
2	Auriol Dongmo	Portugal	17.47	18.76		18.76 m	Q
3	Jorinde van Klinken	Netherlands	18.15	18.65		18.65 m	Q
4	Axelina Johansson	Sweden	18.29			18.29 m	Q
5	Emilia Kangas	Finland	18.04	17.97	x	18.04 m	q
6	Nina Ndubuisi	Germany	17.39	17.71	17.68	17.71 m	q
7	Senja Mäkitörmä	Finland	16.52	16.63	17.38	17.38 m	
8	Katrin Brzyszkowská	Czech Republic	16.49	16.76	16.70	16.76 m	
9	Zuzanna Maślana	Poland	16.49	x	16.72	16.72 m	
10	Renáta Beregszászi	Hungary	x	16.09	x	16.09 m	
11	Victoria Wickman	Sweden	x	15.26	15.84	15.84 m	
12	Erna Sóley Gunnarsdóttir	Iceland	15.41	15.72	15.63	15.72 m	
13	Sara Verteramo	Italy	15.42	15.69	15.62	15.69 m	
14	Maria Rafailidou	Greece	14.63	13.89	14.63	14.63 m	

==== Group B ====
Place	Athlete	Nation	Round			Result	Notes
Place	Athlete	Nation	#1	#2	#3	Result	Notes
1	Jessica Schilder	Netherlands	19.00			19.00 m	Q
2	Fanny Roos	Sweden	18.72			18.72 m	Q
3	Jessica Inchude	Portugal	18.17	x	18.57	18.57 m	Q
4	Alida van Daalen	Netherlands	16.78	17.13	17.68	17.68 m	q
5	Katharina Maisch	Germany	x	x	17.64	17.64 m	q
6	Eliana Bandeira	Portugal	17.62	17.60	17.47	17.62 m	q
7	María Belén Toimil	Spain	x	16.52	16.79	16.79 m	
8	Serena Vincent	Great Britain & N.I.	16.65	x	15.55	16.65 m	
9	Miryam Mazenauer	Switzerland	15.88	x	16.50	16.50 m	
10	Martina Mazurová	Czech Republic	x	16.12	x	16.12 m	
11	Anna Musci	Italy	15.49	x	x	15.49 m	
12	Minttu Laurila	Finland	15.40	15.11	15.31	15.40 m	
13	Maria Mangoulia	Greece	x	14.38	14.71	14.71 m	

=== Final ===
The final was held on 10 August 2026, at 19:03 in the evening.

Place	Athlete	Nation	Round						Result	Notes
Place	Athlete	Nation	#1	#2	#3	#4	#5	#6	Result	Notes
1st place, gold medalist(s)	Jessica Schilder	Netherlands	19.81	20.09	20.52	x	20.09	20.73	20.73 m	
2nd place, silver medalist(s)	Jorinde van Klinken	Netherlands	19.64	19.34	x	x	x	x	19.64 m	PB
3rd place, bronze medalist(s)	Yemisi Mabry	Germany	19.20	x	x	x	19.50	19.33	19.50 m	
4	Fanny Roos	Sweden	18.83	19.05	x	19.04	18.70	18.44	19.05 m	
5	Auriol Dongmo	Portugal	18.46	x	19.05	19.01	18.97	18.97	19.05 m	
6	Jessica Inchude	Portugal	18.35	18.38	x	x	18.57	x	18.57 m	
7	Katharina Maisch	Germany	18.39	18.28	x	x	x	x	18.39 m	
8	Nina Chioma Ndubuisi	Germany	18.08	x	18.21	17.30	17.70	18.09	18.21 m	
9	Emilia Kangas	Finland	17.02	18.20	x				18.20 m	
10	Axelina Johansson	Sweden	17.92	18.18	17.99				18.18 m	
11	Alida van Daalen	Netherlands	17.54	17.21	x				17.54 m	
12	Eliana Bandeira	Portugal	x	17.20	x				17.20 m	
