= Finland at the 2023 World Athletics Championships =

- Flag of Finland
- WA code: FIN

in Budapest, Hungary 19 August 2023 – 27 August 2023
- Competitors: 40 (13 men and 27 women)
- Medals Ranked 39th: Gold 0 Silver 0 Bronze 1 Total 1

World Athletics Championships appearances
- 1976; 1980; 1983; 1987; 1991; 1993; 1995; 1997; 1999; 2001; 2003; 2005; 2007; 2009; 2011; 2013; 2015; 2017; 2019; 2022; 2023

Finland competed at the 2023 World Athletics Championships in Budapest, Hungary, from 19 to 27 August 2023.

== Medalists ==
The following Finnish competitors won medals at the Championships

Medal	Athlete	Event	Date
Bronze	Wilma Murto	Pole vault	23 August

== Results ==
Finland entered 40 athletes.

Key

- Q = Qualified for the next round
- q = Qualified for the next round as a fastest loser or, in field events, by position without achieving the qualifying target
- NR = National record
- PB = Personal best
- SB = Season best
- N/A = Round not applicable for the event

=== Men ===
Track and road events

Athlete	Event	Heat		Semifinal		Final	
Athlete	Event	Result	Rank	Result	Rank	Result	Rank
Joonas Rinne	800 metres	1:45.93	4	Did not advance			
Joonas Rinne	1500 metres	3:47.16	7	Did not advance			
Elmo Lakka	110 metres hurdles	13.69	7	Did not advance			
Topi Raitanen	3000 metres steeplechase	8:30.69	11	—		Did not advance	
Jerry Jokinen	20 kilometres walk	—				1:26:54	43
Veli-Matti Partanen	20 kilometres walk	—				1:18:22 NR	6
Aleksi Ojala	35 kilometres walk	—				2:38:34	25
Veli-Matti Partanen	35 kilometres walk	—				2:32:28	18

Field events

Athlete	Event	Qualification		Final	
Athlete	Event	Distance	Position	Distance	Position
Juho Alasaari	Pole vault	5.35	=22	Did not advance	
Urho Kujanpää	Pole vault	NM		Did not advance	
Aaro Davidila	Triple jump	15.81	26	Did not advance	
Aaron Kangas	Hammer throw	72.96	17	Did not advance	
Lassi Etelätalo	Javelin throw	78.19	18	Did not advance	
Oliver Helander	Javelin throw	80.19	10 q	83.38	7
Toni Kuusela	Javelin throw	79.27	13	Did not advance	

=== Women ===
Track and road events

Athlete	Event	Heat		Semifinal		Final	
Athlete	Event	Result	Rank	Result	Rank	Result	Rank
Anniina Kortetmaa	200 metres	23.52	7	Did not advance			
Aino Pulkkinen	200 metres	23.48	8	Did not advance			
Mette Baas	400 metres	52.74	7	Did not advance			
Eveliina Määttänen	800 metres	2:00.41	3 Q	1:59.81 PB	5	Did not advance	
Nathalie Blomqvist	1500 metres	4:06.93 PB	11	Did not advance			
Camilla Richardsson	5000 metres	15:13.84	12	—		Did not advance	
Camilla Richardsson	10,000 metres	—				32:15.74	15
Nina Chydenius	Marathon	—				2:42:36	54
Alisa Vainio	Marathon	—				2:32:14	22
Lotta Harala	100 metres hurdles	13.11	5	Did not advance			
Reetta Hurske	100 metres hurdles	12.92	5 q	13.05	7	Did not advance	
Viivi Lehikoinen	400 metres hurdles	54.65	4 Q	54.48	3	Did not advance	

Field events

Athlete	Event	Qualification		Final	
Athlete	Event	Distance	Position	Distance	Position
Ella Junnila	High jump	1.89	=12 q	1.90	=13
Heta Tuuri	High jump	1.80	32	Did not advance	
Saga Andersson	Pole vault	NM		Did not advance	
Elina Lampela	Pole vault	4.50	=22	Did not advance	
Wilma Murto	Pole vault	4.65	=1 Q	4.80 =SB	3rd place, bronze medalist(s)
Kristiina Mäkelä	Triple jump	13.88	18	Did not advance	
Senni Salminen	Triple jump	13.50	30	Did not advance	
Emilia Kangas	Shot put	15.94	33	Did not advance	
Senja Mäkitörmä	Shot put	16.27	31	Did not advance	
Eveliina Rouvali	Shot put	16.61	29	Did not advance	
Salla Sipponen	Discus throw	54.72	31	Did not advance	
Suvi Koskinen	Hammer throw	70.81	15	Did not advance	
Silja Kosonen	Hammer throw	74.19 PB	3 Q	73.89	5
Krista Tervo	Hammer throw	68.00	23	Did not advance	
Anni-Linnea Alanen	Javelin throw	58.30	17	Did not advance	

Combined events – Heptathlon

Athlete	Event	100H	HJ	SP	200 m	LJ	JT	800 m	Final	Rank
Saga Vanninen	Result	13.62	1.80 =PB	14.78	24.71	6.06	48.32	2:20.13	6289	9
Saga Vanninen	Points	1033	978	846	914	868	828	822	6289	9
