= 2021 European Athletics Indoor Championships – Women's shot put =

The women's shot put event at the 2021 European Athletics Indoor Championships was held on 4 March at 19:15 (qualification) and 5 March at 19:06 (final) local time.

== Medalists ==
Gold	Silver	Bronze
Auriol Dongmo; Portugal	Fanny Roos; Sweden	Christina Schwanitz; Germany

== Records ==
Standing records prior to the 2021 European Athletics Indoor Championships
World record	Helena Fibingerová (TCH)	22.50	Jablonec nad Nisou, Czechoslovakia	19 February 1977
European record	Helena Fibingerová (TCH)	22.50	Jablonec nad Nisou, Czechoslovakia	19 February 1977
Championship record	Helena Fibingerová (TCH)	21.46	San Sebastián, Spain	13 March 1977
World Leading	Auriol Dongmo (POR)	19.65	Karlsruhe, Germany	29 January 2021
European Leading	Auriol Dongmo (POR)	19.65	Karlsruhe, Germany	29 January 2021

== Results ==
=== Qualification ===
Qualification: Qualifying performance 18.40 (Q) or at least 8 best performers (q) advance to the Final.

Rank	Athlete	Nationality	#1	#2	#3	Result	Note
1	Christina Schwanitz	Germany	18.86			18.86	Q
2	Aliona Dubitskaya	Belarus	18.00	18.74		18.74	Q, SB
3	María Belén Toimil	Spain	18.64			18.64	Q, NR
4	Auriol Dongmo	Portugal	17.78	18.55		18.55	Q
5	Jessica Schilder	Netherlands	18.24	17.78	18.48	18.48	Q, PB
6	Fanny Roos	Sweden	17.78	18.45		18.45	Q
7	Sara Gambetta	Germany	x	18.43		18.43	Q, PB
8	Markéta Červenková	Czech Republic	17.93	18.16	17.59	18.16	q, PB
9	Sophie McKinna	Great Britain	17.59	17.95	x	17.95	
10	Katharina Maisch	Germany	17.93	17.72	17.59	17.93	
11	Emel Dereli	Turkey	17.83	17.59	17.60	17.83	
12	Klaudia Kardasz	Poland	17.57	x	17.81	17.81	
13	Amelia Strickler	Great Britain	17.12	16.91	x	17.12	
14	Chiara Rosa	Italy	16.30	16.56	16.90	16.90	
15	Frida Åkerström	Sweden	16.17	16.86	16.72	16.86	
16	Senja Mäkitörmä	Finland	16.71	16.74	16.76	16.76	
17	Sara Lennman	Sweden	16.01	x	16.08	16.08	

=== Final ===
Rank	Athlete	Nationality	#1	#2	#3	#4	#5	#6	Result	Note
1st place, gold medalist(s)	Auriol Dongmo	Portugal	x	19.21	19.07	19.08	19.34	x	19.34	
2nd place, silver medalist(s)	Fanny Roos	Sweden	x	18.53	18.59	x	19.29	x	19.29	NR
3rd place, bronze medalist(s)	Christina Schwanitz	Germany	18.21	18.71	18.39	18.41	18.29	19.04	19.04	
4	Aliona Dubitskaya	Belarus	18.11	18.44	18.70	18.61	18.46	18.86	18.86	SB
5	Jessica Schilder	Netherlands	x	18.02	18.02	18.29	18.69	x	18.69	PB
6	Sara Gambetta	Germany	18.30	x	18.34	x	18.13	17.94	18.34	
7	María Belén Toimil	Spain	x	17.41	x	17.80	x	18.01	18.01	
8	Markéta Červenková	Czech Republic	16.85	17.28	17.75	17.55	17.47	17.42	17.75	
