= 2026 World Athletics Indoor Championships – Women's shot put =

Women's shot put at the 2026 World Athletics Indoor Championships
- Venue: Kujawsko-Pomorska Arena Toruń
- Location: Toruń, Poland
- Dates: 20 March
- Winning mark: 20.14 m

Medalists
gold medal	Chase Jackson	United States
silver medal	Sarah Mitton	Canada
bronze medal	Axelina Johansson	Sweden

The women's shot put at the 2026 World Athletics Indoor Championships took place on the short track of the Kujawsko-Pomorska Arena Toruń in Toruń, Poland, on 20 March 2026. This was the 22nd time the event was contested at the World Athletics Indoor Championships. Athletes could qualify by achieving the entry standard or by their World Athletics Ranking in the event.

== Background ==
The women's shot put was contested 21 times before 2026, at every previous edition of the World Athletics Indoor Championships.

Records before the 2026 World Athletics Indoor Championships
Record	Athlete (nation)	Distance (m)	Location	Date
World record	Natalya Lisovskaya (URS)	22.63	Moscow, Soviet Union	7 June 1987
Championship record	Valerie Adams (NZL)	20.67	Sopot, Poland	8 March 2014
2026 World Lead	Jessica Schilder (NED)	20.69	Berlin, Germany	6 March 2026

== Qualification ==
For the women's shot put, the qualification period ran from 1 November 2025 until 8 March 2026. Athletes could qualify by achieving the entry standard of 18.90 m. Athletes could also qualify by virtue of their World Athletics Ranking for the event or by virtue of their World Athletics Indoor Tour wildcard. There is a target number of 16 athletes.

== Results ==
=== Final ===
The final was held on 20 March, starting at 18:10 (UTC+1) in the evening.

Results of the final
Place	Athlete	Nation	#1	#2	#3	#4	#5	#6	Result	Notes
1st place, gold medalist(s)	Chase Jackson	United States	18.35	19.96	x	20.14	x	x	20.14 m	
2nd place, silver medalist(s)	Sarah Mitton	Canada	19.57	19.60	19.47	19.78	x	19.78	19.78 m	
3rd place, bronze medalist(s)	Axelina Johansson	Sweden	18.59	19.75	x	x	19.06	19.54	19.75 m	NR
4	Jessica Schilder	Netherlands	x	19.32	x	19.54	19.63	x	19.63 m	
5	Yemisi Ogunleye	Germany	19.46	18.39	19.18	x	18.88	19.37	19.46 m	
6	Fanny Roos	Sweden	18.32	18.93	18.88	18.56	18.96	18.41	18.96 m	
7	Abria Smith	United States	18.66	18.01	18.19	18.86	x		18.86 m	
8	Auriol Dongmo	Portugal	18.22	18.40	18.82	x	x		18.82 m	
9	Jessica Inchude	Portugal	18.27	17.89	18.77	18.62			18.77 m	
10	Katharina Maisch	Germany	18.11	18.56	x	x			18.56 m	
11	Jorinde van Klinken	Netherlands	x	18.06	x				18.06 m	
12	Ana Caroline Silva	Brazil	17.05	17.28	17.39				17.39 m	
13	Emilia Kangas	Finland	17.05	x	16.85				17.05 m	
14	Ivana Gallardo	Chile	17.04	17.03	16.33				17.04 m	
15	Tapenisa Havea	New Zealand	15.49	x	x				15.49 m	
