= Ana Caroline Silva =

Brazilian shot putter (born 1999)

Personal information
- Full name: Ana Caroline Miguel da Silva
- Born: 12 February 1999 (age 27) Ribeirão das Neves, Brazil
- Education: University of Georgia
- Height: 5 ft 9 in (175 cm)

Sport
- Sport: Athletics
- Event: Shot put
- College team: Georgia Bulldogs

Ana Caroline Miguel da Silva (born 12 February 1999) is a Brazilian athlete specialising in the shot put. She represented her country at the 2022 and 2023 World Championships and the 2024 Summer Olympics without qualifying for the final.

== International competitions ==
Year	Competition	Venue	Position	Event	Notes
Representing Brazil
2017	South American U20 Championships	Leonora, Guyana	2nd	Shot put	13.92 m
2018	World U20 Championships	Tampere, Finland	18th (q)	Shot put	14.15 m
2018	South American U23 Championships	Cuenca, Ecuador	4th	Shot put	14.26 m
2021	South American U23 Championships	Guayaquil, Ecuador	5th	Hammer throw	56.00 m
2021	Junior Pan American Games (U23)	Cali, Colombia	2nd	Shot put	16.86 m
2021	Junior Pan American Games (U23)	Cali, Colombia	–	Hammer throw	NM
2022	World Indoor Championships	Belgrade, Serbia	14th	Shot put	16.85 m
2022	World Championships	Eugene, United States	26th (q)	Shot put	16.58 m
2022	South American Games	Asunción, Paraguay	3rd	Shot put	16.40 m
2023	South American Championships	São Paulo, Brazil	6th	Shot put	16.11 m
2023	World Championships	Budapest, Hungary	25th (q)	Shot put	17.18 m
2023	Pan American Games	Santiago, Chile	5th	Shot put	16.70 m
2024	Ibero-American Championships	Cuiabá, Brazil	3rd	Shot put	17.18 m
2024	Olympic Games	Paris, France	23rd (q)	Shot put	17.09 m
2025	South American Indoor Championships	Cochabamba, Bolivia	2nd	Shot put	16.65 m
2025	South American Championships	Mar del Plata, Argentina	3rd	Shot put	16.09 m
2025	South American Championships	Mar del Plata, Argentina	5th	Hammer throw	61.05 m
2026	South American Indoor Championships	Cochabamba, Bolivia	2nd	Shot put	17.42 m
2026	World Indoor Championships	Toruń, Poland	12th	Shot put	17.39 m
2026	Ibero-American Championships	Lima, Peru	1st	Shot put	17.72 m

== Personal bests ==
Outdoor

- Shot put – 18.46 (Oxford, MS 2022)
- Discus throw – 42.50 (Canyon, TX 2021)
- Weight throw – 17.82 (Coffeyville, KS 2021)
- Hammer throw – 64.60 (Austin, TX 2023)

Indoor

- Shot put – 17.52 (College Station, TX 2022)
- Weight throw – 18.37 (Pittsburg, KS 2021)
