= Emel Dereli =

Turkish athlete (born 1996)

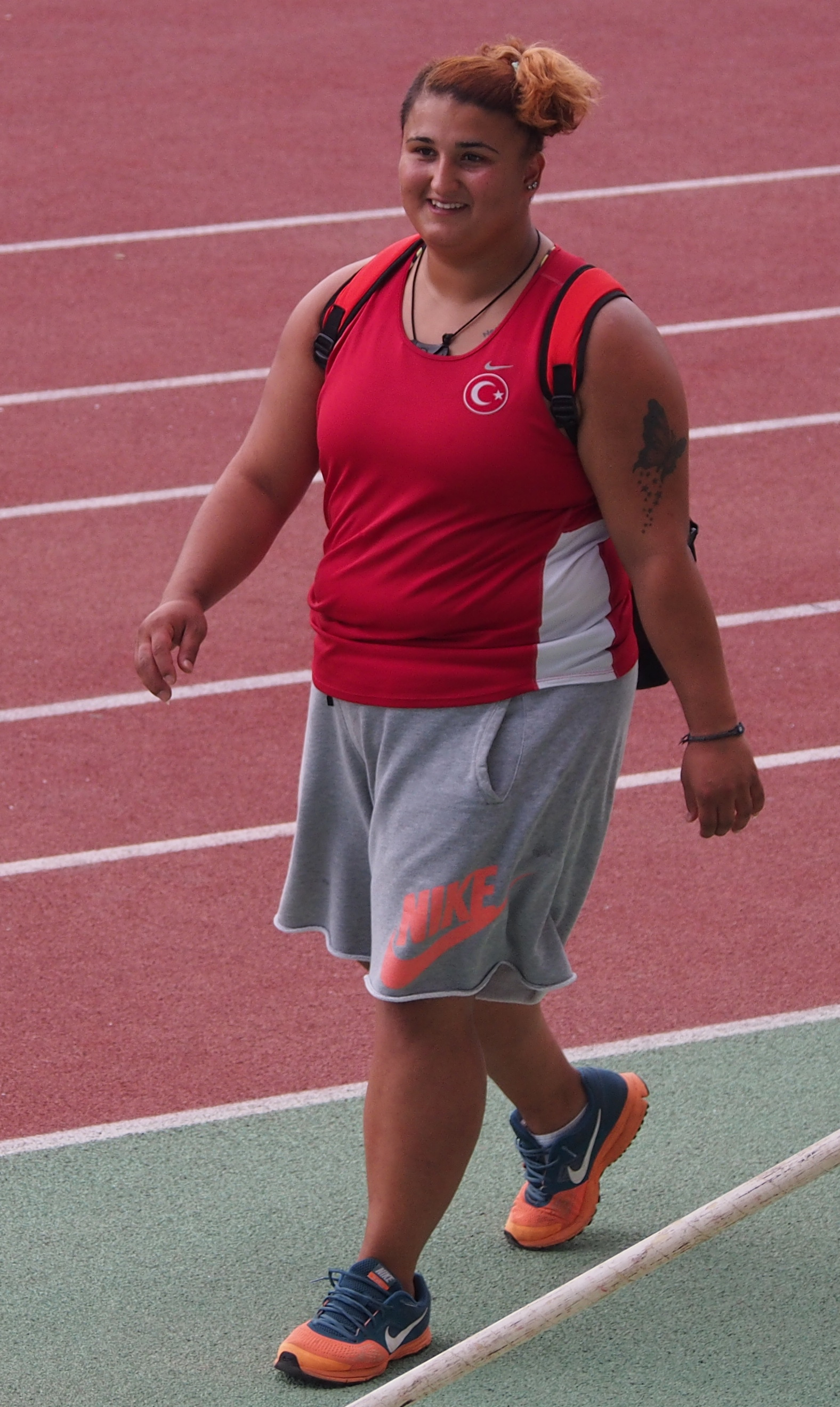
- Dereli in 2015

Personal information
- Nationality: Turkey
- Born: 25 February 1996 (age 30) Zonguldak, Turkey

Sport
- Sport: Shot put
- Club: Fenerbahçe Athletics
- Coached by: İhsan Özden

Achievements and titles
- Personal bests: 18.57 m Shot put (2016); 20.14 m Shot put 3 kg (2013)
Medal record
Women's athletics
Representing Turkey
European Championships
Bronze medal – third place	2016 Amsterdam	Shot put
European Team Championships
Gold medal – first place	2025 Maribor	Shot put
Gold medal – first place	2017 Lille	Shot put
Bronze medal – third place	2013 Gateshead	Shot put
Balkan Indoor Championships
Silver medal – second place	2020 Istanbul	shot put
World Junior Championships
Bronze medal – third place	2014 Oregon	Shot put

Emel Dereli (born 25 February 1996) is a Turkish female track and field athlete competing in shot put and occasionally in discus throw. For the shot put event, she holds a world record in the cadets and a national record in the juniors category. Since 2012, she is a member of Fenerbahçe Athletics. She is coached by İhsan Özden.

== Career ==
Dereli was born in Zonguldak, where she is a student at Vocational High School for Commerce in Zonguldak. She began shot put in 2008, and two years later she was called up for the Turkey national team. She won more than fifty medals at national and international competitions in different age categories.

Dereli took the gold medal in the under 23 category at the 2013 European Cup Winter Throwing held in Castellón, Spain.

She won the gold medal and set a championship record in the shot put 3 kg event at the 2013 World Youth Championships in Athletics in Donetsk, Ukraine. She is the second ever shot putter in the world exceeding the 20 m mark in the cadets category.

At the 2013 European Athletics Junior Championships in Rieti, Italy, she won the gold medal and set a new national record for with 18.04 m.

Dereli won the bronze in the shot put event at the 2016 European Athletics Championships in Amsterdam, Netherlands.

She won the gold medal in the shot put event with 16.23 m at the 2025 European Athletics Team Championships Second Division in Maribor, Slovenia, and contributed to her team's record with 16 points.

== International competitions ==
Year	Competition	Venue	Position	Event	Notes
2012	World Indoor Championships	Istanbul, Turkey	17th	Shot put	16.02 m
2012	European Cup Winter Throwing	Bar, Montenegro	3rd	Shot put (U23)	16.87 m NJR
2012	World Junior Championships	Barcelona, Spain	8th	Shot put	15.86 m
2013	European Cup Winter Throwing	Castellón, Spain	1st	Shot put (U23)	16.78 m
2013	World Youth Championships	Donetsk, Ukraine	1st	Shot put (3 kg)	20.14 m CR
2013	European Junior Championships	Rieti, Italy	1st	Shot put	18.04 m NR
2013	European Team Championships Super League	Gateshead, United Kingdom	3rd	Shot put	17.50 m
2013	European Team Championships Super League	Gateshead, United Kingdom	12th	Discus throw	37.72 m
2013	World Championships	Moscow, Russia	26th (q)	Shot put	16.60 m
2014	World Junior Championships	Eugene, Oregon, United States	3rd	Shot put	16.55 m
2015	European Junior Championships	Eskilstuna, Sweden	1st	Shot put	18.40 m NR
2016	European Championships	Amsterdam, Netherlands	3rd	Shot put	18.22 m
2017	European Team Championships	Lille, France	1st	Shot put	17.97 m
2020	Balkan Indoor Championships	Istanbul, Turkey	2nd	Shot put	17.77 m
2021	European Indoor Championships	Toruń, Poland	11th (q)	Shot put	17.83 m
2021	Olympic Games	Tokyo, Japan	16th (q)	Shot put	17.81 m
2022	Islamic Solidarity Games	Konya, Turkey	1st	Shot put	17.25 m
2022	European Championships	Munich, Germany	21st (q)	Shot put	16.56 m
2023	World University Games	Chengdu, China	4th	Shot put	16.85 m
2024	European Championships	Rome, Italy	11th	Shot put	17.52 m
2024	Olympic Games	Paris, France	24th (q)	Shot put	17.02 m
2025	European Tea Championships 2nd Div.	Maribor, Slovenia	1st	Shot put	16.23 m
2025	Islamic Solidarity Games	Riyadh, Saudi Arabia	1st	Shot put	16.09 m
