= Sopo Shatirishvili =

Georgian shot putter (born 1995)

Personal information
- Nationality: Georgia
- Born: Sopiko Shatirishvili; 15 January 1995 (age 31)

Sport
- Sport: Track and field
- Event: Shot put

Achievements and titles
- Personal bests: Shot put: 18.74 m (Tbilisi, 2021); Discus: 36.21 m (Tbilisi, 2022)

Sopiko Shatirishvili (born 15 January 1995) is a Georgian Olympic shot putter. She has won multiple national championships titles in the shot put, and in 2022 won the Georgian national title in the discus throw.

== Career ==
She was chosen to represent Georgia in the shot put at the inaugural 2015 European Athletics Team Championships in Baku.

Shatirishvili competed at the delayed 2020 Olympic Games in Tokyo, Japan in 2021, managing a distance of 15.31 metres but did not proceed to the final. She had entered the Games with a personal best distance recorded at 18.74 metres.

She won the Georgian Athletics Championships titles in 2022 in both the shot put (16.07 metres), as well as the discus throw, in which she managed a distance of 36.21 metres. She competed in the shot put at the 2022 European Athletics Championships in Munich, Germany where she threw a distance of 15.52 metres without qualifying for the final. She was a silver medalist in the shot put at the 2022 Balkan Athletics Championships in Romania.

She competed at the 2023 European Athletics Indoor Championships in Istanbul, Turkey in the women's shot put in March 2023, achieving a season's best 15.08 metres without qualifying for the final. She threw 15.86 metres in the shot put, placing first among 12 participants, in Georgia's division of the 2023 European Athletics Team Championships in Chorzów, Poland. She was a bronze medalist in the shot put at the 2023 Balkan Athletics Championships in Romania.

She won the Georgian Indoor Athletics Championships in February 2025 with a distance of 14.28 metres.

== Personal life ==
She is from Ozurgeti in the province of Guria in Georgia.
