= Jessica Schilder =

Dutch shot putter (born 1999)

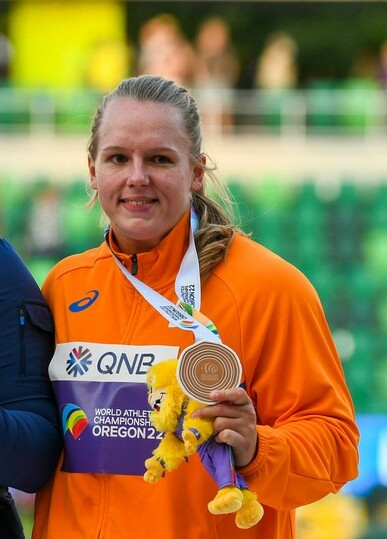
- Schilder with her bronze medal at the 2022 World Championships

Personal information
- Born: 19 March 1999 (age 27) Volendam, Netherlands
- Height: 1.73 m (5 ft 8 in)

Sport
- Country: Netherlands
- Sport: Athletics (track and field)
- Event: Shot put

Achievements and titles
- Highest world ranking: No. 1 (shot put, 2026); No. 5 (overall, 2026)
- Personal bests: Shot put: 21.09 NR (2026); Shot put indoors: 20.69 i NR (2025, 2026)
Medal record
Women's athletics
Representing the Netherlands
World Championships
Gold medal – first place	2025 Tokyo	Shot put
Bronze medal – third place	2022 Eugene	Shot put
World Indoor Championships
Silver medal – second place	2025 Nanjing	Shot put
Bronze medal – third place	2022 Belgrade	Shot put
Diamond League
First place	2025	Shot put
European Championships
Gold medal – first place	2022 Munich	Shot put
Gold medal – first place	2024 Rome	Shot put
Gold medal – first place	2026 Birmingham	Shot put
European Indoor Championships
Gold medal – first place	2025 Apeldoorn	Shot put

Jessica Schilder (pronounced [ˈjɛsikaː] [ˈsxɪldər]; born 19 March 1999) is a Dutch track and field athlete competing in shot put. She is the 2025 World Champion and the Dutch record holder with a throw of 21.09 m from 2026. She is four-time medalist (one gold) at the World Championships (outdoor and indoor) and a three-time gold medalist at the European Championships (outdoor and indoor). Her highest World Athletics Rankings are No. 1 in shot put in 2026 and No. 5 of women overall in 2026.

== Career ==
Schilder competed in the women's shot put event at the 2021 European Athletics Indoor Championships. She also competed in the women's shot put in the delayed 2020 Summer Olympics in Tokyo, Japan, that was postponed to July 2021 due to the coronavirus pandemic, but did not qualify for the final.

She won the bronze medal in the women's shot put event at the 2022 World Athletics Indoor Championships held in Belgrade, Serbia. In August 2022, Schilder won the gold medal in shot put at the European Athletics Championships. She won the bronze medal at the 2022 World Athletics Championships in Eugene, Oregon, with a national record throw of 19.77 metres.

Schilder won the gold medal in the shot put at the 2024 European Athletics Championships in Rome, Italy. She competed at the 2024 Olympic Games in Paris, France, placing sixth in the women's shot put final.

She won the gold medal in the shot put at the 2025 European Athletics Indoor Championships in Apeldoorn. She was the silver medalist in shot put at the 2025 World Athletics Indoor Championships in Nanjing, China in March 2025, and the gold medalist at the 2025 World Athletics Championships in Tokyo, Japan.

In March 2026, she equalled her own national record of 20.69 metres at the ISTAF Indoor meeting in Berlin.

Schilder set a new national record of 21.09 metres at the Shanghai Diamond League on 4 June 2026.

On 10 August 2026, Schilder won the gold medal in the shot put at the European Championships in Birmingham, England, with a throw of 20.73 metres.

== Personal bests ==
Outdoor

- Shot put – 21.09 m NR (Shanghai 16 May 2026)

Indoor

- Shot put - 20.69 m i NR (Apeldoorn 9 March 2025, Berlin 6 March 2026)

== International competitions ==
Results representing the Netherlands
Year	Competition	Location	Position	Result	Notes
2016	World U20 Championships	Bydgoszcz, Poland	12th	14.34 m	
2017	European U20 Championships	Grosseto, Italy	5th	15.99 m	
2018	World U20 Championships	Tampere, Finland	N/A	NM	
2019	European Throwing Cup (U23)	Šamorín, Slovakia	12th	16.18 m	
2019	European U23 Championships	Gävle, Sweden	5th	16.51 m	
2021	European Indoor Championships	Toruń, Poland	5th	18.69 m	
2021	European Team Championships, 1st League	Cluj-Napoca, Romania	5th	16.42 m	
2021	European U23 Championships	Tallinn, Estonia	1st	18.11 m	
2021	Olympic Games	Tokyo, Japan	19th (q)	17.74 m	
2022	European Throwing Cup	Leiria, Portugal	2nd	18.89 m	NR
2022	World Indoor Championships	Belgrade, Serbia	3rd	19.48 m	
2022	World Championships	Eugene, United States	3rd	19.77 m	NR
2022	European Championships	Munich, Germany	1st	20.24 m	NR
2023	European Indoor Championships	Istanbul, Turkey	5th	18.29 m	
2023	World Championships	Budapest, Hungary	8th	19.26 m	
2024	World Indoor Championships	Glasgow, United Kingdom	5th	19.37 m	
2024	European Championships	Rome, Italy	1st	18.77 m	
2024	Summer Olympics	Paris, France	6th	18.91 m	
2025	European Indoor Championships	Apeldoorn, Netherlands	1st	20.69 m	NR
2025	World Indoor Championships	Nanjing, China	2nd	20.07 m	
2025	European Team Championships First Division	Madrid, Spain	1st	20.14 m	CR
2025	World Championships	Tokyo, Japan	1st	20.29 m	
2026	World Indoor Championships	Toruń, Poland	4th	19.63 m	
2026	European Championships	Birmingham, United Kingdom	1st	20.73 m	

=== Circuit wins and titles ===
- Diamond League shot put champion: 2025
  - 2025: Xiamen, Monaco, Chorzów, Zürich
  - 2026: Shanghai, Stockholm

Awards
Preceded by Sifan Hassan	Dutch Athlete of the Year; 2025	Most recent
Preceded by Sifan Hassan	Dutch Sportswoman of the Year; 2025	Most recent
