= Markéta Červenková =

Czech shot putter (born 1991)

Personal information
- Born: 20 August 1991 (age 35)

Sport
- Sport: Athletics
- Event: Shot put
- Club: TJ Dukla Praha

Markéta Červenková (born 20 August 1991) is a Czech athlete specialising in the shot put. She represented her country at two European Championships without qualifying for the final. In addition, she won a bronze medal at the 2016 European Throwing Cup.

Her personal bests in the event are 17.05 metres outdoors (Kladno 2018) and 16.66 metres indoors (Jablonec nad Nisou 2016).

== International competitions ==
Year	Competition	Venue	Position	Event	Notes
Representing the Czech Republic
2009	European Junior Championships	Novi Sad, Serbia	6th	Shot put	14.88 m
2011	European U23 Championships	Ostrava, Czech Republic	15th (q)	Shot put	14.51 m
2016	European Throwing Cup (U23)	Arad, Romania	3rd	Shot put	16.86 m
2016	European Championships	Amsterdam, Netherlands	15th (q)	Shot put	16.56 m
2018	European Championships	Berlin, Germany	17th (q)	Shot put	16.62 m
2021	European Indoor Championships	Toruń, Poland	8th	Shot put	17.75 m
2021	Olympic Games	Tokyo, Japan	24th (q)	Shot put	17.33 m
2022	European Championships	Munich, Germany	–	Shot put	NM
