= Axelina Johansson =

Swedish shot putter (born 2000)

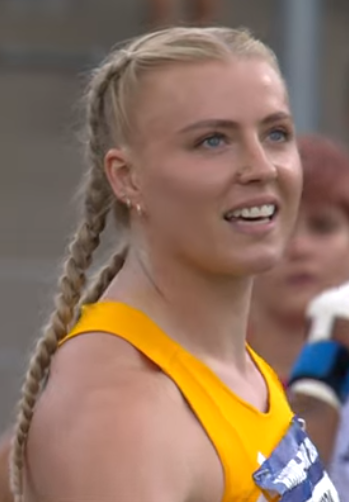
- At the 2025 Summer World University Games

Personal information
- Nationality: Swedish
- Born: 20 April 2000 (age 26) Vaggeryd, Sweden
- Height: 1.75 m (5 ft 9 in)
- Weight: 87 kg (192 lb)

Sport
- Sport: Track and Field
- Event: Shot put

Achievements and titles
- Highest world ranking: 6th (Shot put, 2026)
- Personal bests: SP: 19.97 m NR (2026); DT: 53.45 m (2026)
Medal record
Women's athletics
Representing Sweden
World Indoor Championships
Bronze medal – third place	2026 Toruń	Shot put
European Games
Bronze medal – third place	2023 Kraków-Małopolska	Shot put
European Athletics U23 Championships
Bronze medal – third place	2021 Tallinn	Shot put
Summer World University Games
Gold medal – first place	2025 Bochum	Shot put

Axelina Elin Signe Johansson (born 20 April 2000) is a Swedish track and field athlete who competes in the shot put event, in which she holds the national record. She became Sweden's first ever world medallist in the women's throws with the bronze medal at the 2026 World Athletics Indoor Championships, having previously finished tenth in the shot put final at the 2024 Summer Olympics in Paris, France.

== Biography ==
Johansson threw 16.52m and finished 11th competing in the shot put for the University of Nebraska–Lincoln at the 2022 NCAA Indoor Championships. Johansson threw 17.30m to finish third at the 2022 Big Ten Indoor Championships shot put. As the 2022 Collegiate season moved outdoors, Johansson threw a personal best 18.39m to finish runner up in the shot put at the Big Ten Outdoor Championships. Johansson was subsequently honoured with the Big Ten Women's Outdoor Freshman of the Year award.

Johansson finished third at the 2022 NCAA Outdoor Championships after throwing 18.06m at Hayward Field in Eugene, Oregon. Johansson also competed in Eugene, Oregon at the 2022 World Athletics Championships where she landed a new personal best throw 18.57m to reach the final of the women's shot put before ultimately finishing in twelfth place. Johansson went to Munich to compete in the 2022 European Athletics Championships – Women's shot put and reached the final, finishing seventh with a first round throw of 18.04 which she never bettered.

Johansson won the 2023 NCAA Outdoor title in June 2023. That month, she was a bronze medalist in the shot put at the 2023 European Athletics Team Championships in Silesia, Poland. She finished thirteenth at the 2023 World Athletics Championships in Budapest, Hungary, in August 2023.

Johansson finished eighth at the 2024 World Athletics Indoor Championships in Glasgow, Scotland, with a season’s best throw measured at 18.68 metres. In June 2024, she finished third at the 2024 NCAA Outdoor Championships shot put competition. She competed at the 2024 Summer Olympics in Paris in the shot put, qualifying for the final and placing tenth overall.

Johansson set a Swedish indoor record of 19.31m to win the Big Ten Indoor Championships in Indianapolis in March 2025, with the distance also setting a meeting record. In July 2025, she won the gold medal at the 2025 Summer World University Games in Bochum, Germany. She competed at the 2025 World Championships in Tokyo, Japan, narrowly missing a place in the final.

In December 2025, Johansson set a new Swedish national record of 19.72 metres for the shot put whilst competing indoors in Lincoln, Nebraska at the Husker Holiday Open. The throw also set a new collegiate indoor record which had been held by Jorinde van Klinken since 2023. In February 2026, she set a meet record in the shot put with 19.47m at the Big Ten Indoor Championships. The following month, she won the 2026 NCAA Indoor Championships. On 20 March, she threw a new national record of 19.75 metres to win the bronze medal at the 2026 World Athletics Indoor Championships in Toruń, Poland. In doing so, she became Sweden's first ever world medallist in a women's throwing event. In May, she set meet record of 19.54 metres in the shot put at the Big Ten Championships. On 11 June, Johannson completed a dominate college season, winning the 2026 NCAA Outdoor Championships in Eugene. Any of her five legal throws would have won the competition with her best in the third round being 19.92 metres, which also broke the Adelaide Aquilla meet record from 2022. She placed fourth on 28 June at the 2026 Meeting de Paris. In August, she competed at the 2026 European Athletics Championships in Birmingham, England, in the shot put, placing tenth overall.

== International competitions ==
Year	Competition	Venue	Position	Event	Notes
Representing Sweden
2016	European Youth Championships	Tbilisi, Georgia	21st (q)	Shot put	NM
2018	World U20 Championships	Tampere, Finland	21st (q)	Shot put	13.58 m
2019	European U20 Championships	Borås, Sweden	14th (q)	Shot put	14.70 m
2021	European U23 Championships	Tallinn, Estonia	3rd	Shot put	17.85 m
2022	World Championships	Eugene, United States	12th	Shot put	17.60 m
2022	European Championships	Munich, Germany	7th	Shot put	18.04 m
2023	European Games	Chorzów, Poland	3rd	Shot put	18.32 m
2023	World Championships	Budapest, Hungary	13th (q)	Shot put	18.57 m
2024	World Indoor Championships	Glasgow, United Kingdom	8th	Shot put	18.68 m
2024	Olympic Games	Paris, France	10th	Shot put	18.03 m
2025	World University Games	Bochum, Germany	1st	Shot put	18.45 m
2026	World Indoor Championships	Toruń, Poland	3rd	Shot put	19.75 m NR
2026	European Championships	Birmingham, United Kingdom	10th	Shot put	18.18 m
