= Lívia Avancini =

Brazilian shot putter (born 1992)

Livia Avancini
Personal information
- Born: 8 May 1992 (age 34)

Sport
- Sport: Athletics
- Event: Shot put

Livia Avancini (born 8 May 1992) is a Brazilian athlete specialising in the shot put. She has won several medals on continental level.

Her personal bests in the shot put are 17.74 metres outdoors (São Bernardo do Campo 2022 and 17.52 metres indoors (Cochabamba 2022).

== International competitions ==
| Year | Competition | Venue | Position | Event | Notes |
Representing Brazil
| 2009 | World Youth Championships | Brixen, Italy | 5th | Shot put | 14.24 m |
| 2011 | South American Junior Championships | Medellín, Colombia | 1st | Shot put | 14.75 m |
| 2017 | South American Championships | Asunción, Paraguay | 3rd | Shot put | 16.75 m |
| 2021 | South American Championships | Guayaquil, Ecuador | 1st | Shot put | 17.34 m |
| 2022 | South American Indoor Championships | Cochabamba, Bolivia | 1st | Shot put | 17.52 m |
| 2022 | World Indoor Championships | Belgrade, Serbia | 14th | Shot put | 16.85 m |
| 2022 | Ibero-American Championships | La Nucía, Spain | 6th | Shot put | 16.71 m |
| 2022 | World Championships | Eugene, United States | 28th (q) | Shot put | 16.13 m |
| 2023 | South American Championships | São Paulo, Brazil | 2nd | Shot put | 17.04 m |
| 2023 | World Championships | Budapest, Hungary | 28th (q) | Shot put | 16.62 m |
| 2023 | Pan American Games | Santiago, Chile | 8th | Shot put | 16.54 m |
| 2024 | Ibero-American Championships | Cuiabá, Brazil | 6th | Shot put | 16.57 m |
| 2024 | Olympic Games | Paris, France | 29th (q) | Shot put | 16.26 m |
| 2025 | South American Indoor Championships | Cochabamba, Bolivia | 3rd | Shot put | 15.92 m |
