= 2012 African Championships in Athletics – Women's shot put =

The women's shot put at the 2012 African Championships in Athletics was held at the Stade Charles de Gaulle on 1 July.

The original winner Vivian Chukwuemeka from Nigeria was disqualified, because she was tested positive for a doping substance, stanozolol, on 21 June 2012.

== Medalists ==
Gold	Chinwe Okoro; Nigeria
Silver	Omotayo Talabi; Nigeria
Bronze	Auriole Dongmo Mekemnang; Cameroon

== Records ==
Standing records prior to the 2012 African Championships in Athletics
World record	Natalya Lisovskaya (URS)	22.63	Moscow, Soviet Union	7 June 1987
African record	Vivian Chukwuemeka (NGR)	18.35	Ijebu Ode, Nigeria	17 April 2006
Championship record	Vivian Chukwuemeka (NGR)	17.60	Radès, Tunisia	10 August 2002
Broken records during the 2012 African Championships in Athletics
African record Championship record	Vivian Chukwuemeka (NGR)	18.86	Porto-Novo, Benin	1 July 2012

== Schedule ==
Date	Time	Round
1 July 2012	15:30	Final

== Results ==
=== Final ===
Rank	Athlete	Nationality	#1	#2	#3	#5	#5	#6	Result	Notes
1st place, gold medalist(s)	Chinwe Okoro	Nigeria	15.63	x	16.21	x	x	16.16	16.21	
2nd place, silver medalist(s)	Omotayo Talabi	Nigeria	14.68	x	15.63	x	x	14.70	15.63	
3rd place, bronze medalist(s)	Auriole Dongmo Mekemnang	Cameroon	14.61	14.92	15.09	15.14	x	15.41	15.41	
4	Sonia Smuts	South Africa	14.32	x	15.40	14.13	15.06	14.52	15.40	
5	Alifatou Djibril	Togo	12.81	13.15	13.95	14.16	14.60	13.79	14.60	
6	Elham El Sayed Wahaba	Egypt	x	x	12.70	13.13	12.88	13.32	13.32	
	Vivian Chukwuemeka	Nigeria	~~18.23~~	~~18.41~~	~~18.56~~	~~18.23~~	~~18.86~~	~~18.33~~	DQ	
	Sali Nadounke	Burkina Faso							DNS	
	Mohamad Attya Walaa	Egypt							DNS	
