= Fanny Roos =

Swedish shot putter (born 1995)

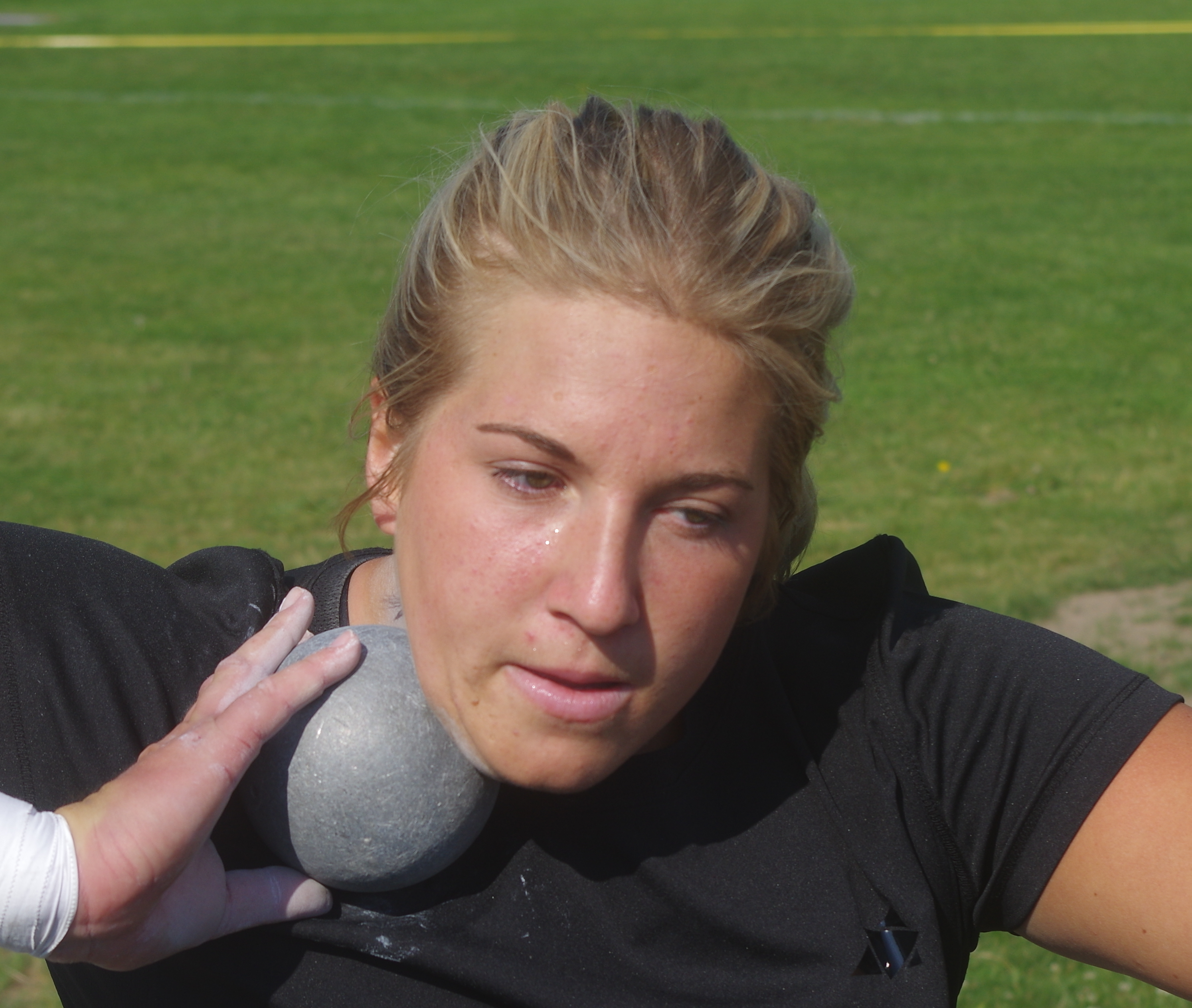

Personal information
- Born: 2 January 1995 (age 31) Ljungby, Sweden
- Height: 1.73 m (5 ft 8 in)

Sport
- Sport: Athletics
- Event: Shot put
- Club: Ljungby FIK; Atleticum Växjö SK
- Coached by: Vésteinn Hafsteinsson

Achievements and titles
- Personal bests: outdoor: 19.66 m NR (2025) indoor: 19.29 m (2021)
Medal record
Women's athletics
Representing Sweden
European Indoor Championships
Silver medal – second place	2021 Toruń	Shot put
Bronze medal – third place	2023 Istanbul	Shot put
European U23 Championships
Gold medal – first place	2017 Bydgoszcz	Shot put

Fanny Matilda Charlotta Roos (born 2 January 1995) is a Swedish athlete specialising in the shot put. She won a silver medal at the 2021 European Indoor Championships, while setting an outright national record of 19.29 meters in the final. In doing so, Roos made history by becoming the first Swedish woman in 93 years, and the second overall, to medal in a throwing event at the Olympics, World-, or European Championships. The first to do so was Ruth Svedberg, who won a bronze medal in the discus throw at the 1928 Summer Olympics.

Roos represented Sweden at the 2017 and 2019 World Championships, but failed to reach the final on both occasions. She reached 7th place at the 2020 Summer Olympics.

Her personal bests in the event are 19.66 metres outdoors (national record - Shanghai 2025) and 19.29 metres indoors (national record - Torun 2021).

== International competitions ==
Year	Competition	Venue	Position	Event	Notes
Representing Sweden
2011	World Youth Championships	Lille, France	10th	Shot put	13.54 m
2012	World Junior Championships	Barcelona, Spain	5th	Shot put	15.20 m
2013	European Junior Championships	Rieti, Italy	13th (q)	Shot put	14.32 m
2014	World Junior Championships	Eugene, United States	6th	Shot put	16.29 m
2015	European Indoor Championships	Prague, Czech Republic	10th (q)	Shot put	16.61 m
2015	European U23 Championships	Tallinn, Estonia	4th	Shot put	16.73 m
2016	European Championships	Amsterdam, Netherlands	20th (q)	Shot put	16.11 m
2017	European Indoor Championships	Belgrade, Serbia	4th	Shot put	18.13 m =NR
2017	European U23 Championships	Bydgoszcz, Poland	1st	Shot put	18.14 m
2017	World Championships	London, United Kingdom	20th (q)	Shot put	17.31 m
2018	World Indoor Championships	Birmingham, United Kingdom	13th	Shot put	17.23 m
2018	European Championships	Berlin, Germany	11th	Shot put	17.09 m
2019	European Indoor Championships	Glasgow, United Kingdom	6th	Shot put	18.21 m
2019	The Match Europe v USA	Minsk, Belarus	2nd	Shot put	19.06 m NR
2019	World Championships	Doha, Qatar	14th (q)	Shot put	18.01 m
2021	European Indoor Championships	Toruń, Poland	2nd	Shot put	19.29 m NR
2021	Olympic Games	Tokyo, Japan	7th	Shot put	18.91 m
2022	World Indoor Championships	Belgrade, Serbia	4th	Shot put	19.22 m
2022	World Championships	Eugene, United States	11th	Shot put	18.27 m
2022	European Championships	Munich, Germany	4th	Shot put	18.55 m
2023	European Indoor Championships	Istanbul, Turkey	3rd	Shot put	18.42 m
2023	World Championships	Budapest, Hungary	14th (q)	Shot put	18.41 m
2024	World Indoor Championships	Glasgow, United Kingdom	9th	Shot put	18.21 m
2024	European Championships	Rome, Italy	6th	Shot put	18.26 m
2024	Olympic Games	Paris, France	7th	Shot put	18.78 m
2025	European Indoor Championships	Apeldoorn, Netherlands	4th	Shot put	19.11 m
2025	World Indoor Championships	Nanjing, China	4th	Shot put	19.28 m
2025	World Championships	Tokyo, Japan	5th	Shot put	19.54 m
2026	World Indoor Championships	Toruń, Poland	6th	Shot put	18.96 m
2026	European Championships	Birmingham, United Kingdom	4th	Shot put	19.05 m
