= Track and field at the 2015 Military World Games – Women's shot put =

The women's shot put event at the 2015 Military World Games was held on 4 October at the KAFAC Sports Complex.

== Records ==
Prior to this competition, the existing world and CISM record were as follows:

World Record	Natalya Lisovskaya (URS)	22.63	Moscow, Soviet Union	7 June 1987
CISM World Record	Christina Schwanitz (GER)	19.30	Warendorf, Germany	15 September 2013

== Schedule ==
Date	Time	Round
4 October 2015	15:10	Final

== Medalists ==
Gold	Silver	Bronze
Gao Yang; China	Irina Tarasova; Russia	Auriol Dongmo Mekemnang; Cameroon

== Results ==
=== Final ===
Rank	Athlete	Nationality	#1	#2	#3	#4	#5	#6	Result	Notes
1st place, gold medalist(s)	Gao Yang	China	17.19	17.56	18.14	x	x	17.91	18.14	
2nd place, silver medalist(s)	Irina Tarasova	Russia	17.83	x	17.90	x	x	x	17.90	
3rd place, bronze medalist(s)	Auriol Dongmo Mekemnang	Cameroon	17.19	17.31	x	x	17.64	x	17.64	
4	Ka Bian	China	17.32	x	17.02	17.10	17.14	17.44	17.44	
5	Ahymara Espinoza	Venezuela	x	16.19	x	x	16.65	x	16.65	
6	Halyna Obleshchuk	Ukraine	15.17	x	x	15.45	15.96	x	15.96	
7	Josephine Terlecki	Germany	15.86	15.53	15.55	x	x	15.80	15.86	
8	Noora Salem Jasim	Bahrain	15.24	15.18	15.21	x	x	14.67	15.24	
9	Iryna Novozhylova	Ukraine	11.05	11.88	12.08				12.08	
10	Rosa Rodríguez	Venezuela	11.35	x	–				11.35	
	Lena Urbaniak	Germany							DNS	
