= Sophie McKinna =

British shot putter (born 1994)

Personal information
- Born: 31 August 1994 (age 31) Gorleston, Norfolk, England
- Height: 1.72 m (5 ft 8 in)
- Weight: 95 kg (209 lb)

Sport
- Sport: Athletics
- Event: Shot put
- Club: Great Yarmouth
- Coached by: Geoff Capes (–2014); Mike Winch (2015–)

Achievements and titles
- National finals: Best Result (gold); Outdoors : 2019, 2020, 2021; Indoors: 2019, 2022, 2023

Sophie McKinna (born 31 August 1994) is a British Olympic athlete specialising in the shot put. She won silver medals at the 2011 World Youth Championships and 2013 European Junior Championships.

Her indoor personal best is 18.82 metres (Birmingham 2022). At the 2019 World Championships in Doha she threw a new outdoor personal best of 18.61m to qualify for the final. By throwing over the 18.50m required she qualified for the Tokyo Olympics in 2020. She competed in the event, throwing 17.81 m in the qualifying round to finish in 17th place.

Domestically, as of 2023 McKinna is a six-time national champion, winning both indoors and outdoors in 2019, outdoors again in 2020 and 2021, and indoors in 2022 and 2023

She is the granddaughter of the former Norwich City footballer and manager Dave Stringer. McKinna works for Norfolk Constabulary as a detention custody officer.

== International competitions ==
| Year | Competition | Venue | Position | Event | Notes |
Representing Great Britain and England
| 2010 | Youth Olympic Games | Singapore | 5th | Shot put | 15.14 m |
| 2011 | World Youth Championships | Lille, France | 2nd | Shot put | 14.90 m |
| 2011 | Commonwealth Youth Games | Douglas, Isle of Man | 1st | Shot put | 14.75 m |
| 2012 | World Junior Championships | Barcelona, Spain | 6th | Shot put | 15.98 m |
| 2013 | European Cup Winter Throwing (U23) | Castellón, Spain | 2nd | Shot put | 16.09 m |
| 2013 | European Junior Championships | Rieti, Italy | 2nd | Shot put | 17.09 m |
| 2014 | Commonwealth Games | Glasgow, United Kingdom | 5th | Shot put | 16.59 m |
| 2015 | European U23 Championships | Tallinn, Estonia | 9th | Shot put | 15.68 m |
| 2018 | Commonwealth Games | Gold Coast, Australia | 5th | Shot put | 17.76 m |
| 2018 | European Championships | Berlin, Germany | 7th | Shot put | 17.69 m |
| 2019 | European Indoor Championships | Glasgow, United Kingdom | 10th (q) | Shot put | 17.18 m |
| 2019 | European Team Championships | Bydgoszcz, Poland | 3rd | Shot put | 17.94 m |
| 2019 | World Championships | Doha, Qatar | 11th | Shot put | 17.99 m |
| 2021 | European Indoor Championships | Toruń, Poland | 9th (q) | Shot put | 17.95 m |
| 2021 | Olympic Games | Tokyo, Japan | 17th (q) | Shot put | 17.81 m |
| 2022 | World Indoor Championships | Belgrade, Serbia | 8th | Shot put | 18.62 m |
| 2022 | World Championships | Eugene, United States | 23rd (q) | Shot put | 17.21 m |
| 2022 | European Championships | Munich, Germany | 12th | Shot put | 16.29 m |

== Personal life ==
McKinna comes from Bradwell, Norfolk. She is openly lesbian.

After sustaining an injury in early 2024, McKinna began working at a Dogs Trust centre in Snetterton.
