= María Belén Toimil =

Spanish shot putter

Personal information
- Full name: María Belén Toimil Fernández
- Nationality: Spanish
- Born: 5 May 1994 (age 32) Mugardos, Spain
- Height: 1.75 m (5 ft 9 in)
- Weight: 89 kg (196 lb)

Sport
- Sport: Athletics
- Event: Shot put
- Club: Playas de Castellon
- Coached by: Carlos Burón
Medal record
Men's athletics
Representing Spain
European Throwing Cup
Bronze medal – third place	2025 Nicosia	Shot put

María Belén Toimil Fernández (born 5 May 1994) is a Spanish athlete specialising in the shot put. She represented her country at the 2017 World Championships without qualifying for the final.

She holds the Spanish shot put records outdoors (18.80 m, Castellón de la Plana, 2021) and indoors (18.64 m, Toruń, 2021).

== Personal bests ==
Outdoor

- Shot put: 18.80 m NR (Castellón 2021)
- Discus throw: 50.42 m (León 2013)

Indoor

- Shot put: 18.64 m NR (Toruń 2021)

== International competitions ==
Year	Competition	Venue	Position	Event	Notes
Representing Spain
2011	World Youth Championships	Lille, France	19th (q)	Shot put	12.87 m
2011	World Youth Championships	Lille, France	22nd (q)	Discus throw	44.21 m
2012	World Junior Championships	Barcelona, Spain	12th	Shot put	14.29 m
2012	World Junior Championships	Barcelona, Spain	21st (q)	Discus throw	45.83 m
2013	European Junior Championships	Rieti, Italy	4th	Shot put	15.82 m
2013	European Junior Championships	Rieti, Italy	5th	Discus throw	50.15 m
2015	European U23 Championships	Tallinn, Estonia	10th	Shot put	15.66 m
2016	Mediterranean U23 Championships	Radès, Tunisia	1st	Shot put	16.30 m
2016	European Championships	Amsterdam, Netherlands	21st (q)	Shot put	16.00 m
2017	World Championships	London, United Kingdom	26th (q)	Shot put	16.38 m
2021	European Indoor Championships	Toruń, Poland	7th	Shot put	18.01 m (Note: 18.64 m NR in the qualification round.)
2021	Olympic Games	Tokyo, Japan	23rd (q)	Shot put	17.38 m
2022	Ibero-American Championships	La Nucía, Spain	2nd	Shot put	17.85 m
2022	World Championships	Eugene, United States	21st (q)	Shot put	17.48 m
2022	European Championships	Munich, Germany	10th	Shot put	17.86 m
2023	European Indoor Championships	Istanbul, Turkey	13th (q)	Shot put	16.88 m
2023	European Games	Chorzów, Poland	17th	Shot put	15.32 m
2024	European Championships	Rome, Italy	5th	Shot put	18.43 m
2024	Olympic Games	Paris, France	25th (q)	Shot put	16.83 m
2026	Ibero-American Championships	Lima, Peru	3rd	Shot put	17.57 m
2026	European Championships	Birmingham, United Kingdom	14th (q)	Shot put	16.79 m
