= Auriol Dongmo =

Portuguese-Cameroonian shot putter

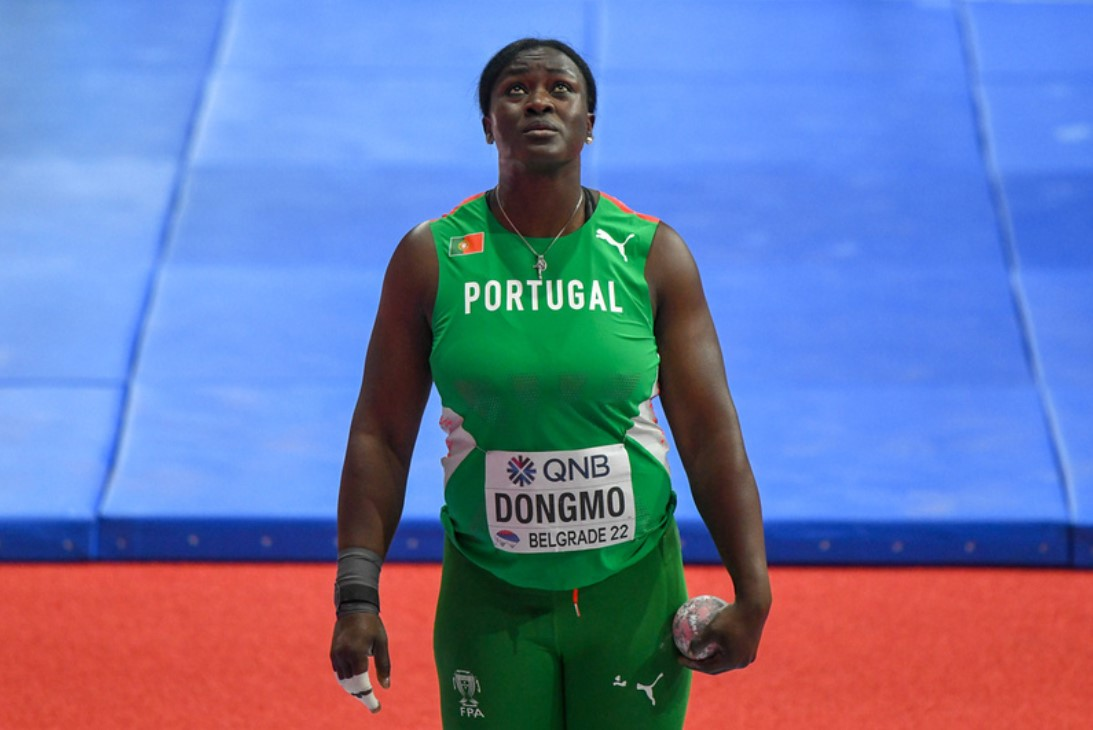

Personal information
- Full name: Auriol Sally Dongmo Mekemnang
- Nationality: Portuguese
- Born: 3 August 1990 (age 36) Ngaoundéré, Cameroon
- Height: 1.83 m (6 ft 0 in)
- Weight: 98 kg (216 lb)

Sport
- Sport: Track and field
- Events: Shot put, discus throw
- Club: Sporting CP
- Coached by: Paulo Reis

Achievements and titles
- Olympic finals: 4th with 19.57 m (64 ft 2 1/4 in) (2020)
- Personal bests: Shot put (outdoor): 19.75 m (64 ft 9 1/2 in) NR; Shot put (indoor): 20.43 m (67 ft 1/4 in) NR; Discus (outdoor): 47.00 m (154 ft 2 1/4 in)
Medal record
Women's athletics
Representing Portugal
World Indoor Championships
Gold medal – first place	2022 Belgrade	Shot put
Diamond League
Runner-up	2021	Shot put
European Championships
Silver medal – second place	2022 Munich	Shot put
European Indoor Championships
Gold medal – first place	2021 Toruń	Shot put
Gold medal – first place	2023 Istanbul	Shot put
Bronze medal – third place	2025 Apeldoorn	Shot put
European Games
Gold medal – first place	2023 Kraków-Małopolska	Shot put
Mediterranean Games
Gold medal – first place	2026 Taranto	Shot put
Representing Cameroon
African Games
Gold medal – first place	2011 Maputo	Shot put
Gold medal – first place	2015 Brazzaville	Shot put
African Championships
Gold medal – first place	2014 Marrakesh	Shot put
Gold medal – first place	2016 Durban	Shot put
Bronze medal – third place	2012 Porto-Novo	Shot put
- Updated on 21 October 2016

Auriol Sally Dongmo Mekemnang (born 3 August 1990) is a Cameroon-born Portuguese track and field athlete who competes in the shot put and discus throw. She represented Cameroon at the 2016 Summer Olympics and the World Athletics Championships in 2015. At continental level, she was a two-time gold medalist at both the African Games and the African Championships in Athletics.

She represented her native Cameroon until 2017, transferring her eligibility to Portugal which became active in 2020.

She holds the Portuguese record in Shot Put with 20.43 m (67 ft 1/4 in) obtained at the 2022 World Athletics Indoor Championships in Belgrade, Serbia. She is also the Cameroonian record holder with 18.37 m (60 ft 3 in) obtained in 2017, still the African record indoors.

== Competition record ==
Year	Competition	Venue	Position	Event	Result
Representing Cameroon
2011	All-Africa Games	Maputo, Mozambique	1st	Shot put	16.03 m
2011	All-Africa Games	Maputo, Mozambique	5th	Discus throw	40.34 m
2012	African Championships	Porto-Novo, Benin	3rd	Shot put	15.41 m
2013	Jeux de la Francophonie	Nice, France	3rd	Shot put	15.30 m
2014	Commonwealth Games	Glasgow, United Kingdom	7th	Shot put	16.50 m
2014	African Championships	Marrakesh, Morocco	1st	Shot put	16.84 m
2014	African Championships	Marrakesh, Morocco	8th	Discus throw	41.35 m
2014	Continental Cup	Marrakesh, Morocco	7th	Shot put	15.77 m
2015	World Championships	Beijing, China	20th (q)	Shot put	16.85 m
2015	African Games	Brazzaville, Republic of the Congo	1st	Shot put	17.21 m
2015	African Games	Brazzaville, Republic of the Congo	5th	Discus throw	45.14 m
2015	Military World Games	Mungyeong, South Korea	3rd	Shot put	17.64 m
2015	Military World Games	Mungyeong, South Korea	8th	Discus throw	46.44 m
2016	African Championships	Durban, South Africa	1st	Shot put	17.64 m
2016	African Championships	Durban, South Africa	7th	Discus throw	47.00 m
2016	Olympic Games	Rio de Janeiro, Brazil	12th	Shot put	16.99 m
2017	Islamic Solidarity Games	Baku, Azerbaijan	1st	Shot put	17.75 m
2017	Jeux de la Francophonie	Abidjan, Ivory Coast	1st	Shot put	17.68 m
2017	World Championships	London, United Kingdom	–	Shot put	NM
Representing Portugal
2021	European Indoor Championships	Toruń, Poland	1st	Shot put	19.34 m
2021	Olympic Games	Tokyo, Japan	4th	Shot put	19.57 m
2022	World Indoor Championships	Belgrade, Serbia	1st	Shot put	20.43 m
2022	World Championships	Eugene, United States	5th	Shot put	19.62 m
2022	European Championships	Munich, Germany	2nd	Shot put	19.82 m
2023	European Indoor Championships	Istanbul, Turkey	1st	Shot put	19.76 m
2023	World Championships	Budapest, Hungary	4th	Shot put	19.69 m
2025	European Indoor Championships	Apeldoorn, Netherlands	3rd	Shot put	19.26 m
2025	World Indoor Championships	Nanjing, China	8th	Shot put	18.54 m
2026	World Indoor Championships	Toruń, Poland	8th	Shot put	18.82 m
2026	European Championships	Birmingham, United Kingdom	5th	Shot put	19.05 m
2026	Mediterranean Games	Taranto, Italy	1st	Shot put	19.42 m

== National titles ==
- Portuguese Outdoor Women's Athletics Championship
  - Shot put: 2019
- Portuguese Indoor Women's Athletics Championship
  - Shot put: 2019

== See also ==
- List of African Games medalists in athletics (women)
- Cameroon at the 2016 Summer Olympics
- Cameroon at the 2015 World Championships in Athletics
