= Frida Åkerström =

Swedish shot putter

Personal information
- Nationality: Swedish
- Born: 29 November 1990 (age 35)

Sport
- Sport: Athletics
- Event: Shot put

Frida Åkerström (born 29 November 1990) is a Swedish athlete. She competed in the women's shot put event at the 2021 European Athletics Indoor Championships.
