= Eliana Bandeira =

Portuguese athlete (born 1996)

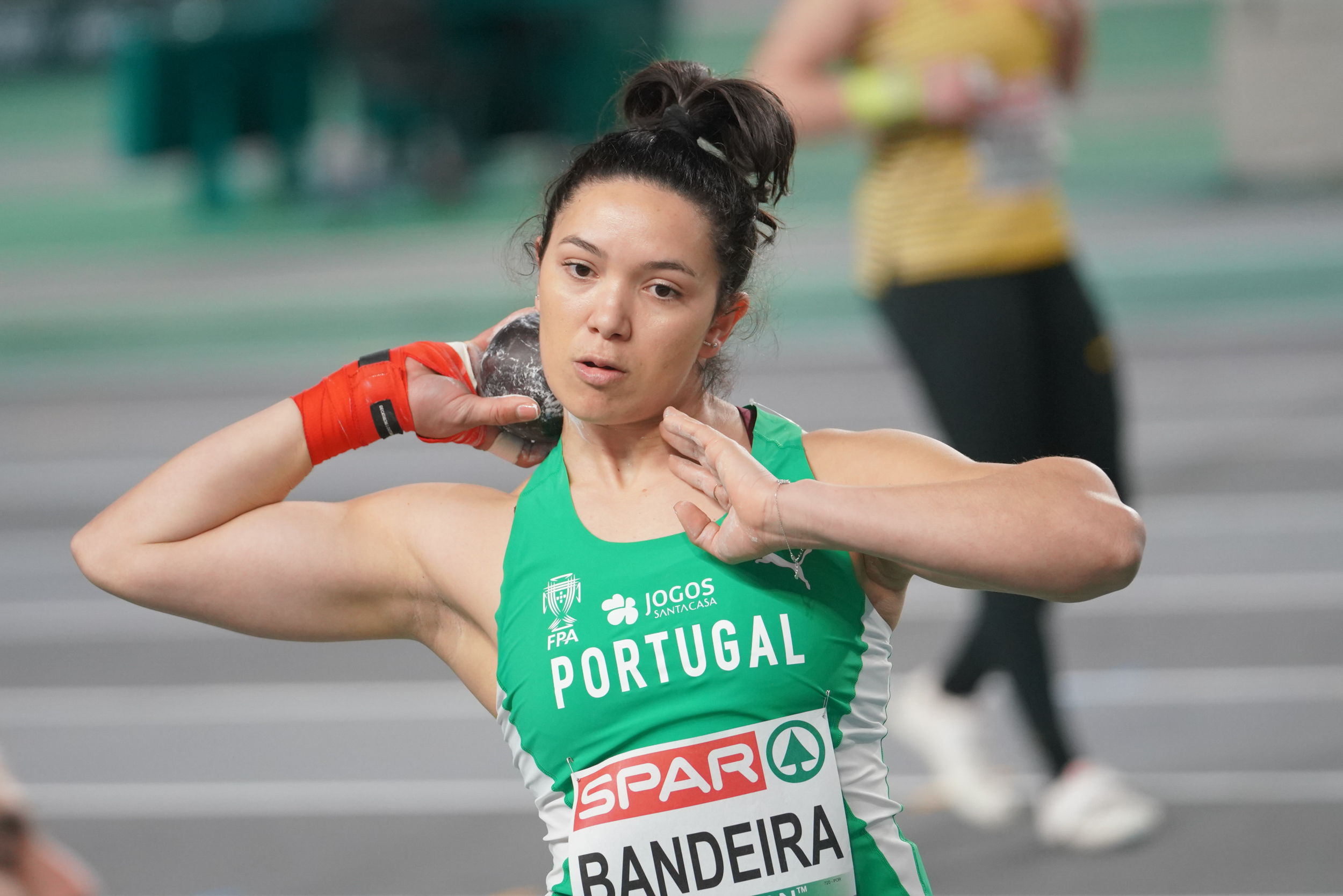
- Bandeira in 2023

Personal information
- Full name: Eliana Arruada Bandeira
- Born: 1 July 1996 (age 30) Fortaleza, Brazil
- Education: Polytechnic Institute of Leiria
- Height: 1.83 m (6 ft 0 in)
- Weight: 88 kg (194 lb)

Sport
- Sport: Athletics
- Event: Shot put
- Club: S.L. Benfica
- Coached by: Paulo Reis (2015–2022); Volodymyr Zinchenko (2022–)

Eliana Arruada Bandeira (born 1 July 1996) is an athlete specialising in the shot put. Born in Brazil, she represents Portugal internationally. She won a silver medal at the 2021 World University Games (held in 2023). University World Champion (China 2023) Bronze in the European Cup (in 2024) Ibero-American Champion (in 2024) Paris 2024 Olympic semifinalist.

== International competitions ==
Year	Competition	Venue	Position	Event	Notes
Representing Portugal
2018	European Throwing Cup (U23)	Leiria, Portugal	3rd	Shot put	15.74 m
2018	Mediterranean U23 Championships	Jesolo, Italy	3rd	Shot put	15.69 m
2018	European Championships	Berlin, Germany	22nd (q)	Shot put	15.18 m
2019	European Throwing Cup	Šamorín, Slovakia	–	Shot put	NM
2021	European Throwing Cup	Split, Croatia	7th	Shot put	17.18 m
2022	Ibero-American Championships	La Nucía, Spain	5th	Shot put	16.95 m
2023	European Indoor Championships	Istanbul, Turkey	12th (q)	Shot put	17.23 m
2023	European Throwing Cup	Leiria, Portugal	5th	Shot put	17.43 m
2023	World University Games	Chengdu, China	2nd	Shot put	17.47 m
2023	World Championships	Budapest, Hungary	21st (q)	Shot put	17.79 m
2024	World Indoor Championships	Glasgow, United Kingdom	12th	Shot put	17.35 m
2024	European Throwing Cup	Leiria, Portugal	3rd	Shot put	17.60 m
2024	Ibero-American Championships	Cuiabá, Brazil	1st	Shot put	18.30 m
2024	European Championships	Rome, Italy	15th (q)	Shot put	16.76 m
2024	Olympic Games	Paris, France	15th (q)	Shot put	17.97 m
2025	European Indoor Championships	Apeldoorn, Netherlands	10th (q)	Shot put	17.44 m
2026	European Championships	Birmingham, United Kingdom	12th	Shot put	17.20 m

== Personal bests ==
Outdoor

- Shot put – 18.49 (Viana do Castelo 2023)
- Discus throw – 52.42 (Leiria 2021)

Indoor

- Shot put – 18.47 (Pombal 2024)
