= Katharina Maisch =

German shot putter

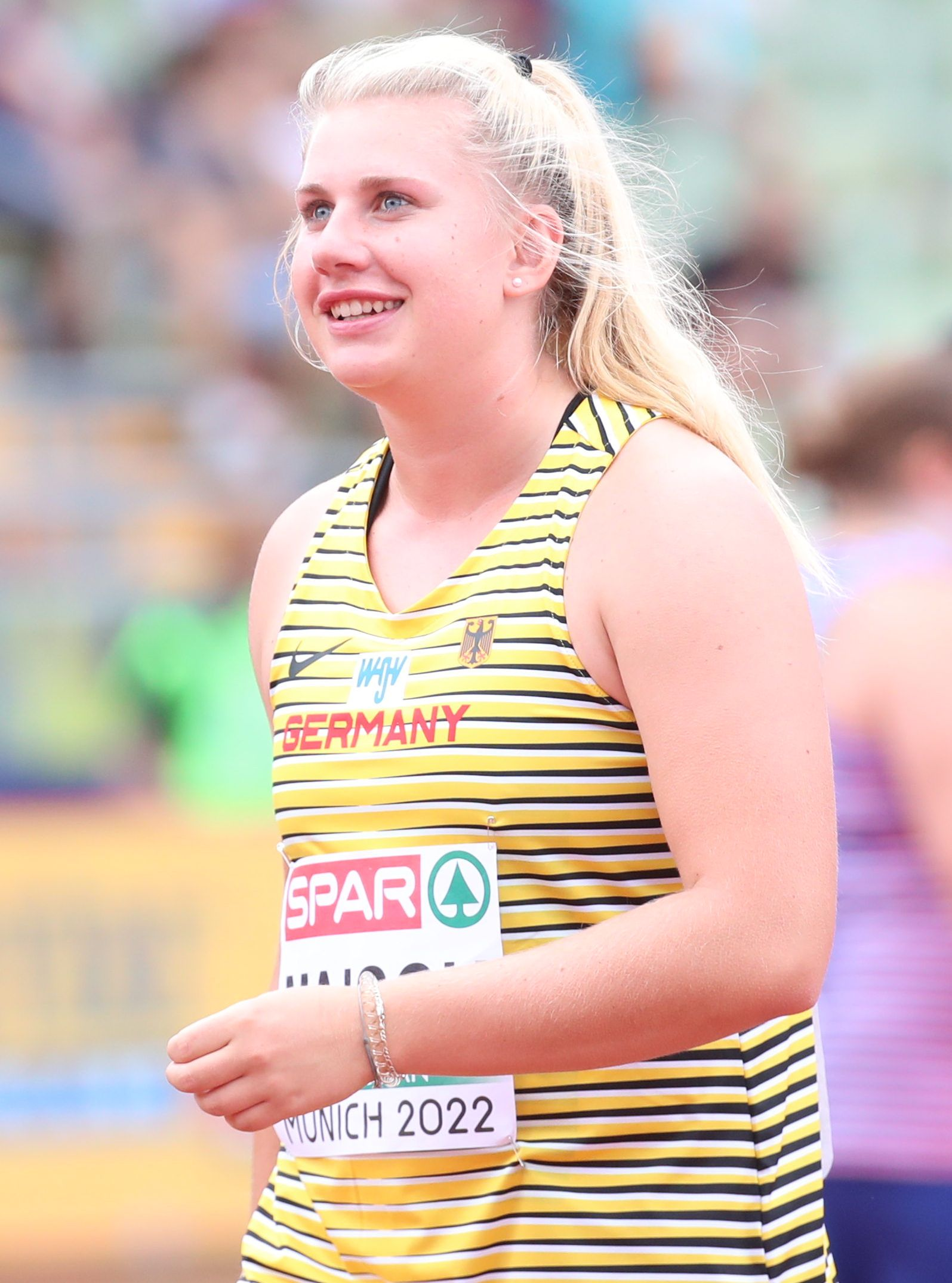
- 2022 in Munich

Personal information
- Nationality: German
- Born: 12 June 1997 (age 29)

Sport
- Sport: Athletics
- Event: Shot put
Medal record
Men's athletics
Representing Germany
European Throwing Cup
Silver medal – second place	2025 Nicosia	Shot put

Katharina Maisch (born 12 June 1997) is a German athlete. She competed in the women's shot put event at the 2021 European Athletics Indoor Championships.

== International competitions ==
Year	Competition	Venue	Position	Event	Notes
Representing Germany
2025	World Championships	Tokyo, Japan	11th	Shot put	18.21 m
2026	World Indoor Championships	Toruń, Poland	10th	Shot put	18.56 m
2026	European Championships	Birmingham, United Kingdom	7th	Shot put	18.39 m
