= Sara Gambetta =

German shot putter (born 1993)

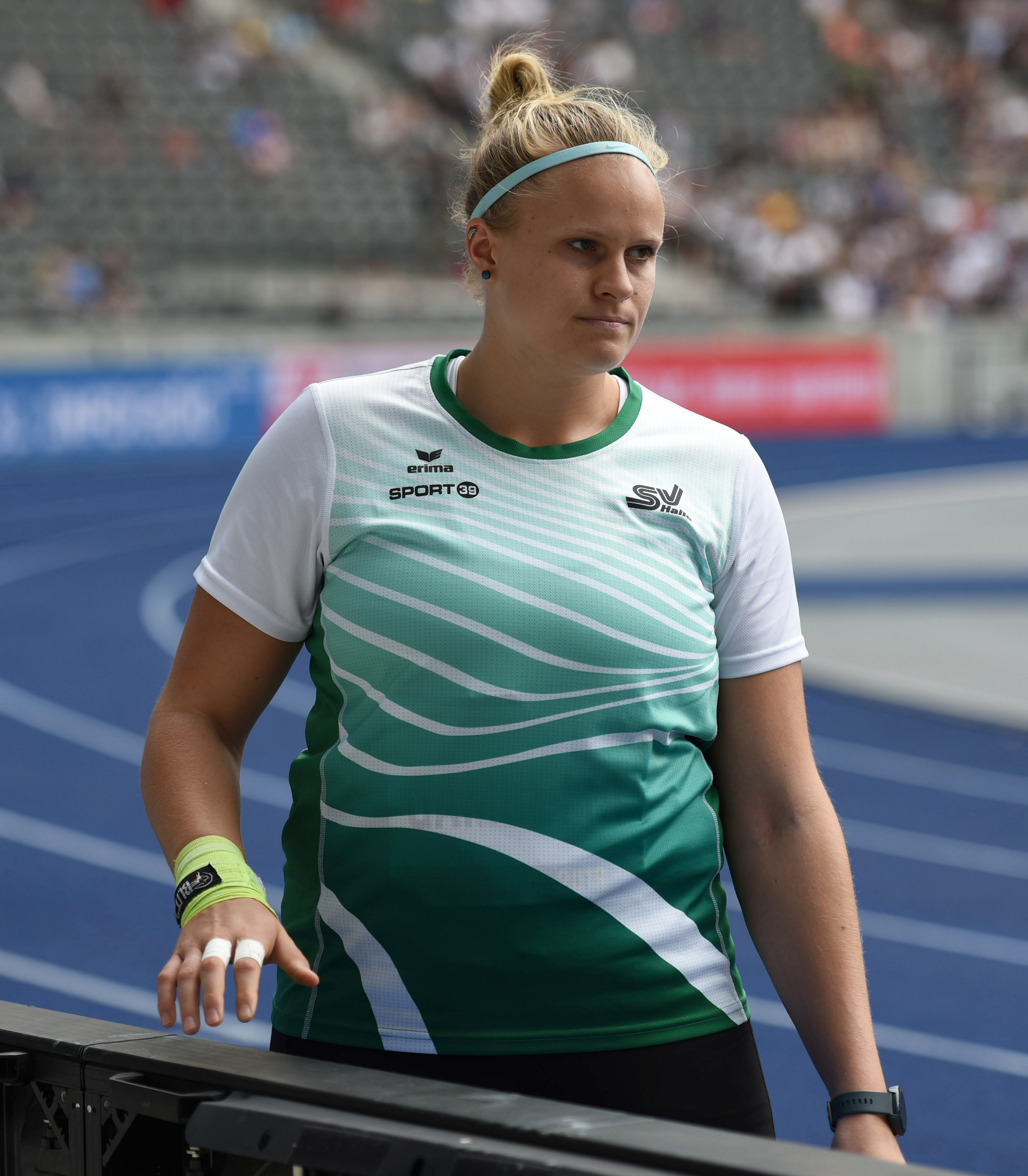
- Gambetta, 2019

Personal information
- Born: 18 February 1993 (age 33) Lauterbach, Hesse, Germany
- Height: 1.84 m (6 ft 0 in)

Sport
- Sport: Athletics
- Event: Shot put
Medal record
Women's athletics
Representing Germany
European Indoor Championships
Silver medal – second place	2023 Istanbul	Shot put

Sara Mabel Gambetta (born 18 February 1993 in Lauterbach, Hesse) is a German shot putter and former heptathlete.

As a heptathlete, she won the silver medal at the 2010 World Junior Championships and at the 2011 European Junior Championships. She then switched to shot put, finishing eighth at the 2013 European U23 Championships and winning the bronze medal at the 2015 European U23 Championships. As a senior, she finished seventh at the 2016 European Championships.

She competed in women's shot put at the 2016 Summer Olympics where she finished 20th in qualification and did not advance.

Her personal best is 17.95 metres, achieved at the 2016 European Championships in Amsterdam. Her personal best in the heptathlon was 6108 points, achieved at the 2011 European Junior Championships in Tallinn.

She represents the club SC DHfK Leipzig.
