= Sara Lennman =

Swedish shot putter

Personal information
- Nationality: Swedish
- Born: 8 April 1996 (age 29)
- Height: 5 ft 8 in (173 cm)
- Weight: 200 lb (91 kg)

Sport
- Sport: Athletics
- Event: Shot put

Sara Lennman (born 8 April 1996) is a Swedish athlete. She competed in the women's shot put event at the 2021 European Athletics Indoor Championships.
