= Emilia Kangas =

Finnish athlete (born 2001)

Personal information
- Born: 10 August 2001 (age 25)

Sport
- Sport: Athletics
- Event: Shot put

Achievements and titles
- Personal best: Shot put: 18.42m (2025)
Medal record
Women's athletics
Representing Finland
European U23 Championships
Bronze medal – third place	2023 Espoo	Shot put

Emilia Kangas (born 10 August 2001) is a Finnish shot putter. She is a multiple-time national champion.

== Biography ==
Kangas is a member of Kuortane Kunto in Kuortane, Finland. She was a bronze medalist at the 2023 European Athletics U23 Championships in Espoo, Finland, finishing behind Alida Van Daalen of the Netherlands, and Serena Vincent of Great Britain, with a throw of 16.75 metres.

Kangas qualified for the final of the 2024 European Athletics Championships, placing twelfth overall in Rome, Italy. She won the Finnish Athletics Championships in Vaasa in June 2024. She subsequently won the Finnish Indoor Athletics Championships in February 2025. She competed for Finland the 2025 European Athletics Indoor Championships, placing twelfth overall in Appeldoorn, Netherlands, in March 2025.

In June 2025, Kangas became the first Finnish woman to shot put over 18 metres since 1997, when she set a mark of 18.20 metres in Kuortane. In August 2025, she retained her national title at the Finnish Championships in Espoo. Later that month, she set a new personal best of 18.41 metres whilst competing in Belgrade to move to third on the Finnish all-time list. She competed at the 2025 World Athletics Championships in Tokyo, Japan, throwing 18.07 metres.

In March 2026, Kangas competed at the 2026 World Athletics Indoor Championships in Toruń, Poland, placing thirteenth overall with a throw of 17.05 metres. In August, she competed at the 2026 European Athletics Championships in Birmingham, England, in the shot put, qualifying for the final and placing ninth overall.
