= Senja Mäkitörmä =

Finnish shot putter

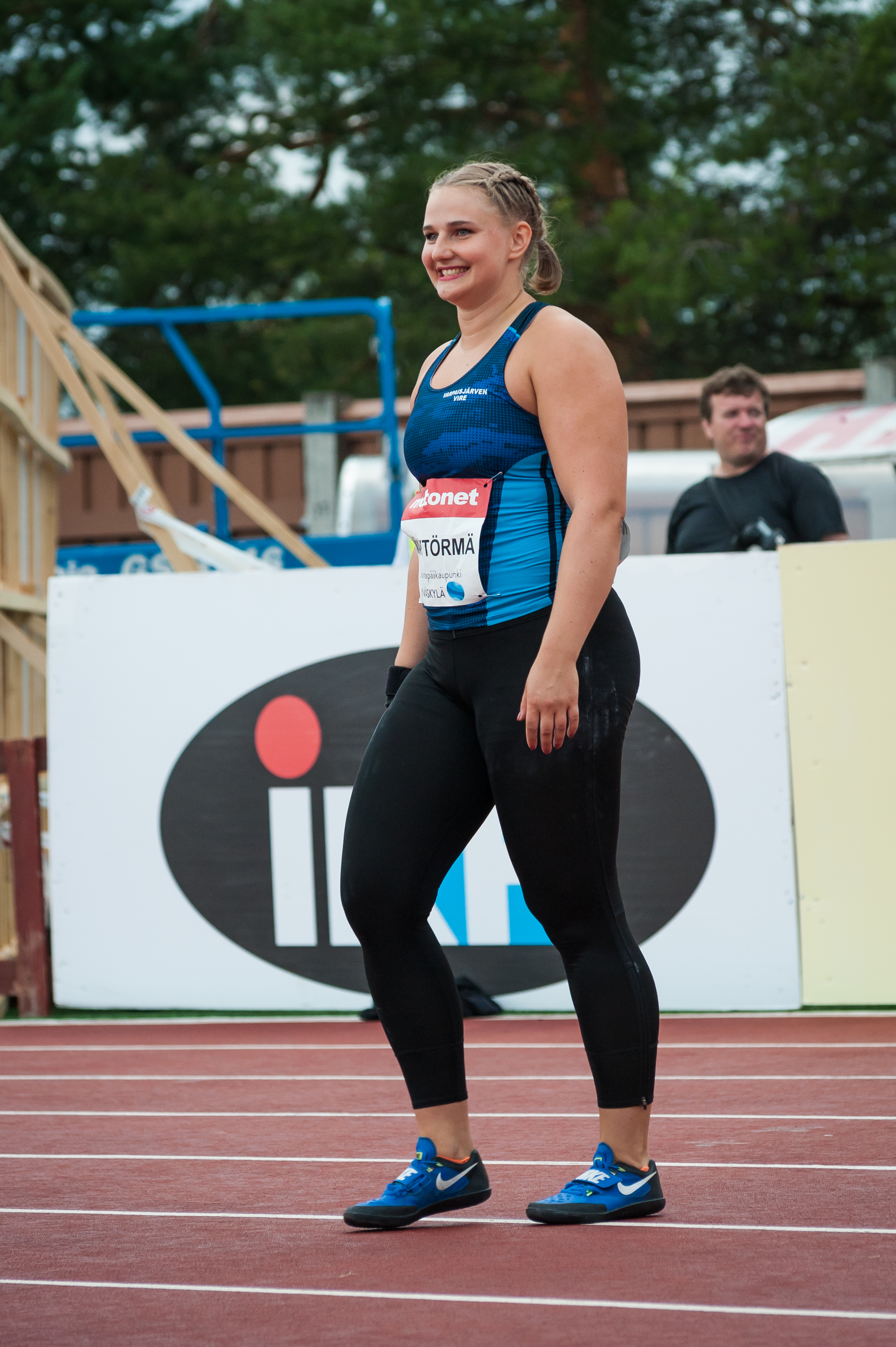
- Senja Mäkitörmä in 2018

Personal information
- Nationality: Finnish
- Born: 31 May 1994 (age 31) Varpaisjärvi, Finland

Sport
- Sport: Athletics
- Event: Shot put

Senja Katriina Mäkitörmä (born 31 May 1994) is a Finnish athlete. She competed in the women's shot put event at the 2021 European Athletics Indoor Championships.
