= Dimitriana Bezede =

Moldovan shot putter (born 1994)

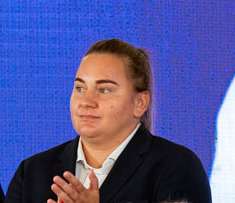
- Bezede in 2024

Personal information
- Born: 12 April 1994 (age 32) Chișinău, Moldova
- Height: 174 cm (5 ft 9 in)
- Weight: 93 kg (205 lb)

Sport
- Country: Moldova
- Sport: Track and field
- Event: Shot put

Dimitriana Bezede (born 12 April 1994), known as Dimitriana Surdu until 2021, is a Moldovan athlete who specialises in the shot put. She competed for Moldova at the Summer Olympics in 2016, 2020 and 2024 and at the European Games in 2016 and 2023.

In March 2026, Bezede was issued with a twelve-month ban backdated to July 2025 by the Athletics Integrity Unit for an anti-doping rule violation after testing positive for letrozole which had been medically prescribed, but for which she had no therapeutic use exemption.

== Personal bests ==
=== Outdoor ===
Event	Record	Venue	Date
Shot put	17.85	Tiraspol	29 May 2016
Discus throw	52.92	Chișinău	7 February 2016

=== Indoor ===
Event	Record	Venue	Date
Shot put	16.72	Chișinău	9 January 2016
