= 2011 World Youth Championships in Athletics – Girls' shot put =

Girls' shot put at the 2011 World Youth Championships in Athletics
- Venue: Stadium Lille Métropole
- Dates: 6 July (qualification & final)
- Competitors: 35
- Winning distance: 15.24

Medalists
gold medal	Guo Tianqian	China
silver medal	Sophie McKinna	Great Britain
bronze medal	Katinka Urbaniak	Germany

The girls' shot put at the 2011 World Youth Championships in Athletics was held at the Stadium Lille Métropole on 6 July.

== Medalists ==
Gold	Silver	Bronze
Guo Tianqian; China	Sophie McKinna; Great Britain	Katinka Urbaniak; Germany

== Records ==
Prior to the competition, the following records were as follows.

World Youth Best	Ilke Wyludda (GDR)	19.08	Karl-Marx-Stadt, East Germany	9 August 1986
Championship Record	Valerie Adams (NZL)	17.08	Debrecen, Hungary	13 July 2001
World Youth Leading	Guo Tianqian (CHN)	16.45	Jinan, China	3 June 2011

== Qualification ==
Qualification rule: qualification standard 14.00 m or at least best 12 qualified.

=== Group A ===
Rank	Name	Nationality	#1	#2	#3	Result	Notes
1	Guo Tianqian	China	14.68			14.68	Q
2	Katinka Urbaniak	Germany	14.24			14.24	Q
3	Lee Min-a	South Korea	14.22			14.22	Q, PB
4	Torie Owers	United States	13.15	13.64	14.13	14.13	Q
5	Izabela da Silva	Brazil	13.45	13.42	12.93	13.45	q
6	Filoi Aokuso	Australia	12.48	13.19	13.28	13.28	q
7	Evgeniya Manushkina	Uzbekistan	13.26	x	12.94	13.26	q
8	Li Tong	China	13.12	13.11	13.01	13.12	SB
9	Camilla Rønning	Norway	11.47	12.75	13.10	13.10	PB
10	Cecile Meyer	South Africa	12.63	12.38	12.94	12.94	
11	María Belén Toimil	Spain	x	12.52	12.87	12.87	
12	Kristina Jurigová	Czech Republic	12.81	x	x	12.81	
13	Rose Pierre-Louis	France	x	12.49	12.69	12.69	
14	Kayla Gallagher	Canada	12.50	12.38	x	12.50	
15	Claudia Martinon	France	11.57	11.11	11.80	11.80	
16	Emina Konjić	Bosnia and Herzegovina	10.85	11.60	11.18	11.60	
17	Rahma Bouslama	Tunisia	11.11	11.48	x	11.48	

=== Group B ===
Rank	Name	Nationality	#1	#2	#3	Result	Notes
1	Sophie McKinna	Great Britain	13.73	13.83	14.27	14.27	Q
2	Siositina Hakeai	New Zealand	13.63	14.23		14.23	Q
3	Fanny Roos	Sweden		13.94	13.02	13.94	q
4	Monia Cantarella	Italy	13.82	13.07	x	13.82	q
5	Lezaan Jordaan	South Africa	13.39	13.09	13.17	13.39	q, PB
6	Tatsiana Volskaya	Belarus	12.92	13.22	13.12	13.22	
7	Chamaya Turner	United States	12.49	13.12	13.20	13.20	
8	Fadya El-Kasaby	Egypt	12.61	12.88	x	12.88	
9	Milena Draguljević	Serbia	12.56	12.37	12.83	12.83	
10	Eleftheria Terzaki	Greece	12.36	11.43	12.42	12.42	
11	Kätlin Piirimäe	Estonia		12.26	12.39	12.39	
12	Lisette Liivrand	Estonia	11.57	12.10	11.57	12.10	
13	Anna Gyenes	Hungary	10.65	11.88	x	11.88	
14	Merewarihi Vaka	New Zealand	11.74	x	10.98	11.74	SB
15	Sarah Moss	Canada	11.51	x	11.40	11.51	
16	Olga Khizhnyakova	Kazakhstan		10.04	10.69	10.69	
17	Jolyn Iro	Cook Islands	10.29	9.97	10.08	10.29	SB
18	Yulduzay Kishikova	Turkmenistan	9.14	8.84	x	9.14	

== Final ==
Rank	Name	Nationality	#1	#2	#3	#4	#5	#6	Result	Notes
1st place, gold medalist(s)	Guo Tianqian	China	x	15.07	15.24	15.06	x	x	15.24	
2nd place, silver medalist(s)	Sophie McKinna	Great Britain	13.16	14.79	14.74	14.90	14.71	14.39	14.90	
3rd place, bronze medalist(s)	Katinka Urbaniak	Germany	14.32	14.17	14.69	14.54	14.71	14.67	14.71	
4	Lee Min-a	South Korea	14.65	x	14.16	x	14.15	14.10	14.65	PB
5	Torie Owers	United States	x	14.44	14.40	x	13.58	x	14.44	
6	Monia Cantarella	Italy	12.87	13.86	12.96	13.45	13.22	14.01	14.01	
7	Siositina Hakeai	New Zealand	13.65	13.73	x	x	13.64	13.35	13.73	
8	Filoi Aokuso	Australia	13.27	13.49	13.68	13.14	13.11	x	13.68	
9	Lezaan Jordaan	South Africa	13.63	13.37	13.32				13.63	PB
10	Fanny Roos	Sweden	13.54	x	x				13.54	
11	Izabela da Silva	Brazil	x	12.94	13.36				13.36	
12	Evgeniya Manushkina	Uzbekistan	12.52	12.85	12.65				12.85	
