= Athletics at the 2014 Asian Games – Men's pole vault =

Men's pole vault at the 2014 Asian Games
- Venue: Incheon Asiad Main Stadium
- Dates: 28 September 2014
- Competitors: 16 from 11 nations

Medalists
| gold medal | Xue Changrui | China |
| silver medal | Daichi Sawano | Japan |
| bronze medal | Jin Min-sub | South Korea |

The men's pole vault event at the 2014 Asian Games was held at the Incheon Asiad Main Stadium, Incheon, South Korea on 28 September.

== Schedule ==
All times are Korea Standard Time (UTC+09:00)

| Date | Time | Event |
|---|---|---|
| Sunday, 28 September 2014 | 18:30 | Final |

== Records ==
Prior to this competition, the existing world, Asian and Games records were as follows.

| World Record | Renaud Lavillenie (FRA) | 6.16 | Donetsk, Ukraine | 15 February 2014 |
| Asian Record | Igor Potapovich (KAZ) | 5.92 | Stockholm, Sweden | 19 February 1998 |
| Games Record | Igor Potapovich (KAZ) | 5.65 | Hiroshima, Japan | 14 October 1994 |

== Results ==
Legend

- DNS — Did not start
- NM — No mark

| Rank | Athlete | Attempt | | | | | | | | Result | Notes |
| Rank | Athlete | 4.75 | 4.95 | 5.10 | 5.25 | 5.35 | 5.45 | 5.55 | 5.65 | Result | Notes |
|---|---|---|---|---|---|---|---|---|---|---|---|
| 1st place, gold medalist(s) | Xue Changrui (CHN) | – | – | – | – | – | O | O | XXX | 5.55 | |
| 2nd place, silver medalist(s) | Daichi Sawano (JPN) | – | – | – | – | XXO | XXO | O | XXX | 5.55 | |
| 3rd place, bronze medalist(s) | Jin Min-sub (KOR) | – | – | – | – | XO | O | X– | XX | 5.45 | |
| 4 | Yang Yansheng (CHN) | – | – | – | O | – | XXO | XXX | | 5.45 | |
| 5 | Nikita Filippov (KAZ) | – | – | – | O | – | XXX | | | 5.25 | |
| 6 | Muntadher Faleh (IRQ) | – | O | XO | O | XXX | | | | 5.25 | |
| 7 | Hsieh Chia-han (TPE) | – | XO | O | XXX | | | | | 5.10 | |
| 8 | Iskandar Alwi (MAS) | XO | XO | O | XXX | | | | | 5.10 | |
| 9 | Hussain Al-Hizam (KSA) | – | O | XXX | | | | | | 4.95 | |
| 10 | Kreeta Sintawacheewa (THA) | O | XXO | XXX | | | | | | 4.95 | |
| — | Mohamad Al-Malla Khalaf (SYR) | XXX | | | | | | | | NM | |
| — | Fahad Al-Mershad (KUW) | – | – | – | – | XX– | X | | | NM | |
| — | Sergey Grigoryev (KAZ) | – | – | XXX | | | | | | NM | |
| — | Han Du-hyeon (KOR) | – | – | – | XXX | | | | | NM | |
| — | Seito Yamamoto (JPN) | – | – | – | – | XXX | | | | NM | |
| — | Ali Al-Sabaghah (KUW) | | | | | | | | | DNS | |
