= Athletics at the 2006 Asian Games – Men's pole vault =

Men's pole vault at the 2006 Asian Games
- Venue: Khalifa International Stadium
- Date: 10 December 2006
- Competitors: 14 from 10 nations

Medalists
gold medal	Daichi Sawano	Japan
silver medal	Leonid Andreev	Uzbekistan
bronze medal	Yang Yansheng	China

The men's pole vault competition at the 2006 Asian Games in Doha, Qatar was held on 10 December 2006 at the Khalifa International Stadium.

== Schedule ==
All times are Arabia Standard Time (UTC+03:00)

Date	Time	Event
Sunday, 10 December 2006	15:30	Final

== Records ==
Prior to this competition, the existing world, Asian and Games records were as follows.

World Record	Sergey Bubka (UKR)	6.14	Sestriere, Italy	31 July 1994
Asian Record	Grigoriy Yegorov (KAZ); Grigoriy Yegorov (KAZ); Igor Potapovich (KAZ)	5.90	Stuttgart, Germany; London, United Kingdom; Nice, France	19 August 1993; 10 September 1993; 10 July 1996
Games Record	Igor Potapovich (KAZ)	5.65	Hiroshima, Japan	14 October 1994

== Results ==
Legend

- DNS — Did not start
- NM — No mark

Rank	Athlete	Attempt										Result	Notes
Rank	Athlete	4.70	4.90	5.10	5.20	5.30	5.40	5.45	5.50	5.55	5.60	Result	Notes
Rank	Athlete	5.65	5.70	5.75	5.80							Result	Notes
1st place, gold medalist(s)	Daichi Sawano (JPN)	–	–	–	–	–	O	–	O	–	O	5.60	
1st place, gold medalist(s)	Daichi Sawano (JPN)	–	–	–	XXX							5.60	
2nd place, silver medalist(s)	Leonid Andreev (UZB)	–	–	–	XO	–	XO	–	–	O	–	5.55	
2nd place, silver medalist(s)	Leonid Andreev (UZB)	XXX										5.55	
3rd place, bronze medalist(s)	Yang Yansheng (CHN)	–	–	O	O	XXO	O	–	O	–	XXX	5.50	
4	Mohsen Rabbani (IRI)	–	O	XO	XO	XO	XXX					5.30	
5	Sompong Saombankuay (THA)	XXO	–	XO	XXX							5.10	
6	Artem Pilipenko (KAZ)	–	O	XXX								4.90	
7	Ali Al-Sabaghah (KUW)	O	XO	XXX								4.90	
7	Kim Se-in (KOR)	–	XO	–	XX–							4.90	
9	Amnat Kunpadit (THA)	O	–	XXX								4.70	
10	Abdulla Ghanim Saeed (QAT)	XXO	XXX									4.70	
—	Kim Yoo-suk (KOR)	–	–	–	XXX							NM	
—	Alexandr Akhmedov (KAZ)	–	XXX									NM	
—	Muhammad Ayub (PAK)	XXX										NM	
—	Fahad Al-Mershad (KUW)											DNS	
