= Athletics at the 2026 Asian Games – Women's shot put =

Women's shot put at the 2026 Asian Games
- Venue: Mizuho Park Athletic Stadium, Nagoya
- Date: 25 September 2026
- Competitors: 8 from 5 nations

Medalists
gold medal	Song Jiayuan	China
silver medal	Zhang Linru	China
bronze medal	Manpreet Kaur	India

The women's shot put competition at the 2026 Asian Games took place on 25 September 2026 at the Mizuho Park Athletic Stadium in Nagoya, Japan. Song Jiayuan and Zhang Linru of China won the gold and silver medal respectively, while Manpreet Kaur of India won the bronze medal.

== Schedule ==
All times are Japan Standard Time (UTC+09:00)

Schedule
Date	Time	Event
Friday, 25 September 2026	19:05	Final

== Records ==
Prior to this competition, the existing world, Asian and Games records were as follows.

World Record	Natalya Lisovskaya (URS)	22.63	Moscow, Soviet Unione	6 July 1987
Asian Record	Li Meisu (CHN)	21.76	Shijiazhuang, China	23 April 1988
Games Record	Sui Xinmei (CHN)	20.55	Beijing, China	1 October 1990

== Results ==
Rank	Athlete	Attempt						Result	Notes
Rank	Athlete	1	2	3	4	5	6	Result	Notes
1st place, gold medalist(s)	Song Jiayuan (CHN)	19.08	19.40	18.69	X	X	X	19.40	SB
2nd place, silver medalist(s)	Zhang Linru (CHN)	18.14	18.04	X	X	X	17.93	18.14	
3rd place, bronze medalist(s)	Manpreet Kaur (IND)	16.32	16.41	16.80	17.17	16.75	X	16.80	
4	Jeong Yu-sun (KOR)	16.52	16.29	16.60	16.78	16.43	X	16.78	SB
5	Krishna Jayasankar (IND)	16.57	16.51	15.94	16.16	X	14.97	16.57	
6	Chiang Ching-yuan (TPE)	X	15.66	15.22	16.36	16.27	16.06	16.36	
7	Wu Ci-en (TPE)	16.05	X	X	X	X	X	16.05	
8	Nani Shahirah Maryata (MAS)	15.07	14.94	14.87	14.67	X	13.96	15.07	SB
