= Athletics at the 2010 Asian Games – Men's pole vault =

Men's pole vault at the 2010 Asian Games
- Venue: Aoti Main Stadium
- Date: 22 November 2010
- Competitors: 13 from 8 nations

Medalists
gold medal	Yang Yansheng	China
silver medal	Leonid Andreev	Uzbekistan
silver medal	Kim Yoo-suk	South Korea

The men's pole vault event at the 2010 Asian Games was held at the Aoti Main Stadium, Guangzhou, China on 22 November.

== Schedule ==
All times are China Standard Time (UTC+08:00)

Date	Time	Event
Monday, 22 November 2010	17:00	Final

== Records ==
Prior to this competition, the existing world, Asian and Games records were as follows.

World Record	Sergey Bubka (UKR)	6.14	Sestriere, Italy	31 July 1994
Asian Record	Grigoriy Yegorov (KAZ); Grigoriy Yegorov (KAZ); Igor Potapovich (KAZ)	5.90	Stuttgart, Germany; London, United Kingdom; Nice, France	19 August 1993; 10 September 1993; 10 July 1996
Games Record	Igor Potapovich (KAZ)	5.65	Hiroshima, Japan	14 October 1994

== Results ==
Legend

- NM — No mark

Rank	Athlete	Attempt									Result	Notes
Rank	Athlete	4.60	4.80	5.00	5.10	5.20	5.30	5.40	5.50	5.55	Result	Notes
1st place, gold medalist(s)	Yang Yansheng (CHN)	–	–	–	–	–	XO	–	XO		5.50	
2nd place, silver medalist(s)	Leonid Andreev (UZB)	–	–	–	–	XO	O	–	XX–	X	5.30	
2nd place, silver medalist(s)	Kim Yoo-suk (KOR)	–	–	O	O	XO	O	XXX			5.30	
4	Mohsen Rabbani (IRI)	–	–	O	O	O	XXX				5.20	
5	Takafumi Suzuki (JPN)	–	–	–	–	XO	XXX				5.20	
6	Sompong Saombankuay (THA)	–	O	XO	–	XXX					5.00	
7	Fahad Al-Mershad (IOC)	–	O	XXX							4.80	
7	Yun Dae-uk (KOR)	–	O	XXX							4.80	
9	Hsieh Chia-han (TPE)	–	XO	XXX							4.80	
9	Lu Yao (CHN)	–	XO	XXX							4.80	
9	Kreeta Sintawacheewa (THA)	–	XO	XXX							4.80	
12	Alec Hsu (TPE)	XO	XXO	XXX							4.80	
—	Ali Al-Sabaghah (IOC)	XXX									NM	
