= 2011 Asian Athletics Championships – Men's pole vault =

The Men's pole vault event took place on July 8, 2011, at the Kobe Universiade Memorial Stadium.

== Medalists ==
Gold	Daichi Sawano; Japan
Silver	Hiroki Ogita; Japan
Bronze	Yansheng Yang; China

== Records ==
World record	Sergey Bubka (UKR)	6.14	Sestriere, Italy	31 July 1994
Asian record	Grigoriy Yegorov (KAZ)	5.90	Stuttgart, Germany	19 August 1993
Championship record	Grigoriy Yegorov (KAZ)	5.70	Manila, Philippines	2003

== Results ==
=== Final ===
Rank	Name	Nationality	4.60	4.75	4.90	5.05	5.20	5.30	5.40	5.50	5.72	Notes
1st place, gold medalist(s)	Daichi Sawano	Japan	–	–	–	–	–	–	xo	o	xxx	
2nd place, silver medalist(s)	Hiroki Ogita	Japan	–	–	–	–	o	–	o	xxx		
3rd place, bronze medalist(s)	Yansheng Yang	China	–	–	–	–	o	–	xo	xxx		
4	Nikita Filippov	Kazakhstan	–	–	–	o	o	o	xxo	xx		
5	Takafumi Suzuki	Japan	–	–	–	–	o	–	xxx			
6	Jin Min-Sub	South Korea	–	–	–	xo	o	xxx				
7	Hsieh Chia-Han	Chinese Taipei	–	–	o	o	xxx					
8	Mohsen Rabbani	Iran	–	–	o	xxx						
–	Leonid Andreev	Uzbekistan	–	–	–	–	xx–					NM
–	Mohamad Malla Khalaf	Syria	xxx									NM
–	Fahad Al-Mershad	Kuwait										DNS
