= Abha Khatua =

Indian shot putter (born 1995)

Personal information
- Born: 7 September 1995 (age 30) Belda, West Bengal, India

Sport
- Sport: Athletics
- Event: Shot put

Achievements and titles
- Personal bests: 18.41 m NR (2024)
Medal record
Women's athletics
Representing India
Asian Championships
Silver medal – second place	2023 Bangkok	Shot put
South Asian Games
Gold medal – first place	2019 Kathmandu	Shot put

Abha Khatua (born 7 September 1995) is an Indian shot putter. She represented her country at the 2023 Asian Championships where she won silver. Khatua holds the Indian national record of 18.41 m.

== Early life ==
Khatua was born in Khursi village near Belda, West Bengal. Her father is a farmer, who works as sharecropper and does not own a land. Khatua used to help her father with farming whenever she was at home.

== Career ==
Khatua was enrolled to the Sports Authority of India hostel in Kolkata in 2018, receiving her first significant break. She tried several track and field events, including javelin, shot put, 100 m, 200 m, 400 m, and the heptathlon. Hepathlon helped her to improve her overall athletic skills. In 2019, she made the most progress in shot put and chose to remain with it. In 2022, Khatua won gold at the 1st Indian Open Throws Competition held at Patiala, by throwing 17.09 m in shot put and won gold. In 2023 Asian Athletics Championships, she finished second by throwing 18.06 m and equalled the shot put national record of Manpreet Kaur.

In May 2024, Abha broke the women's shot put national record with a throw of 18.41 m at the National Federation Cup tournament in Bhubaneswar.

She qualified for 2024 Paris Olympics but was dropped in the last minute and was recalled from the training camp in Europe.
