= 2017 Asian Athletics Championships – Women's shot put =

The women's shot put at the 2017 Asian Athletics Championships was held on 6 July.

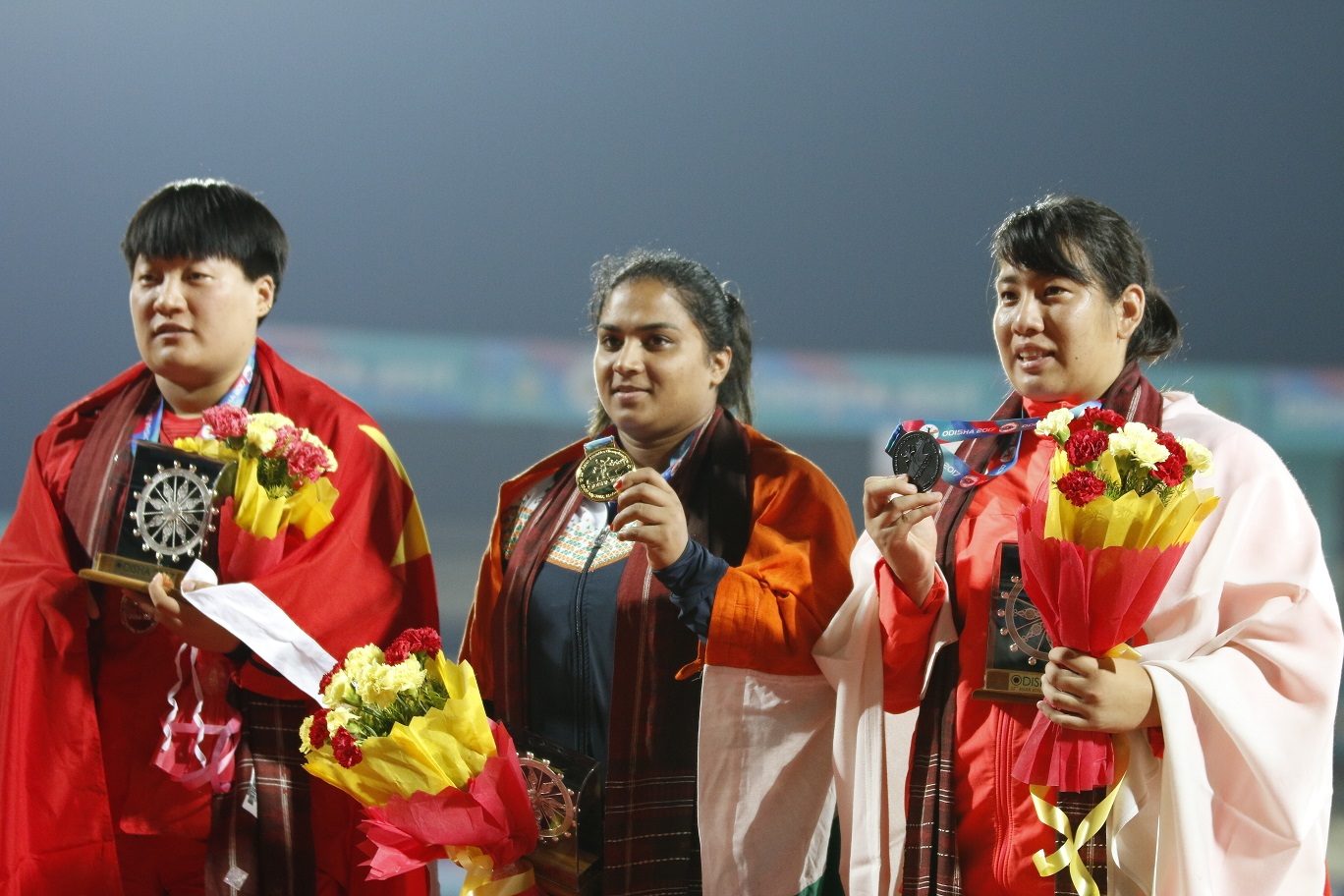
The original podium (before disqualification of Manpreet Kaur)

== Results ==
Rank	Name	Nationality	1	2	3	4	5	6	Result
1st place, gold medalist(s)	Guo Tianqian	China	17.47	17.76	17.75	17.91	17.58	17.62	17.91
2nd place, silver medalist(s)	Aya Ota	Japan	14.48	15.28	15.11	x	15.27	15.45	15.45
3rd place, bronze medalist(s)	Nanaka Kori	Japan	x	14.95	x	15.23	15.33	15.25	15.33
4	Anamika Das	India	13.83	14.96	14.85	x	14.47	14.84	14.96
5	Ramanpreet Kaur	India	14.76	14.91	x	x	14.00	14.33	14.91
DQ	Manpreet Kaur	India	~~17.52~~	x	~~18.28~~	x	x	x	~~18.28~~
	Chandra Kala	Nepal							DNS
	Noora Jasim	Bahrain							DNS

- Manpreet Kaur originally won the gold medal, but she was disqualified after she tested positive for Dimethylbutylamine.
