= Xue Changrui =

Chinese pole vaulter (born 1991)

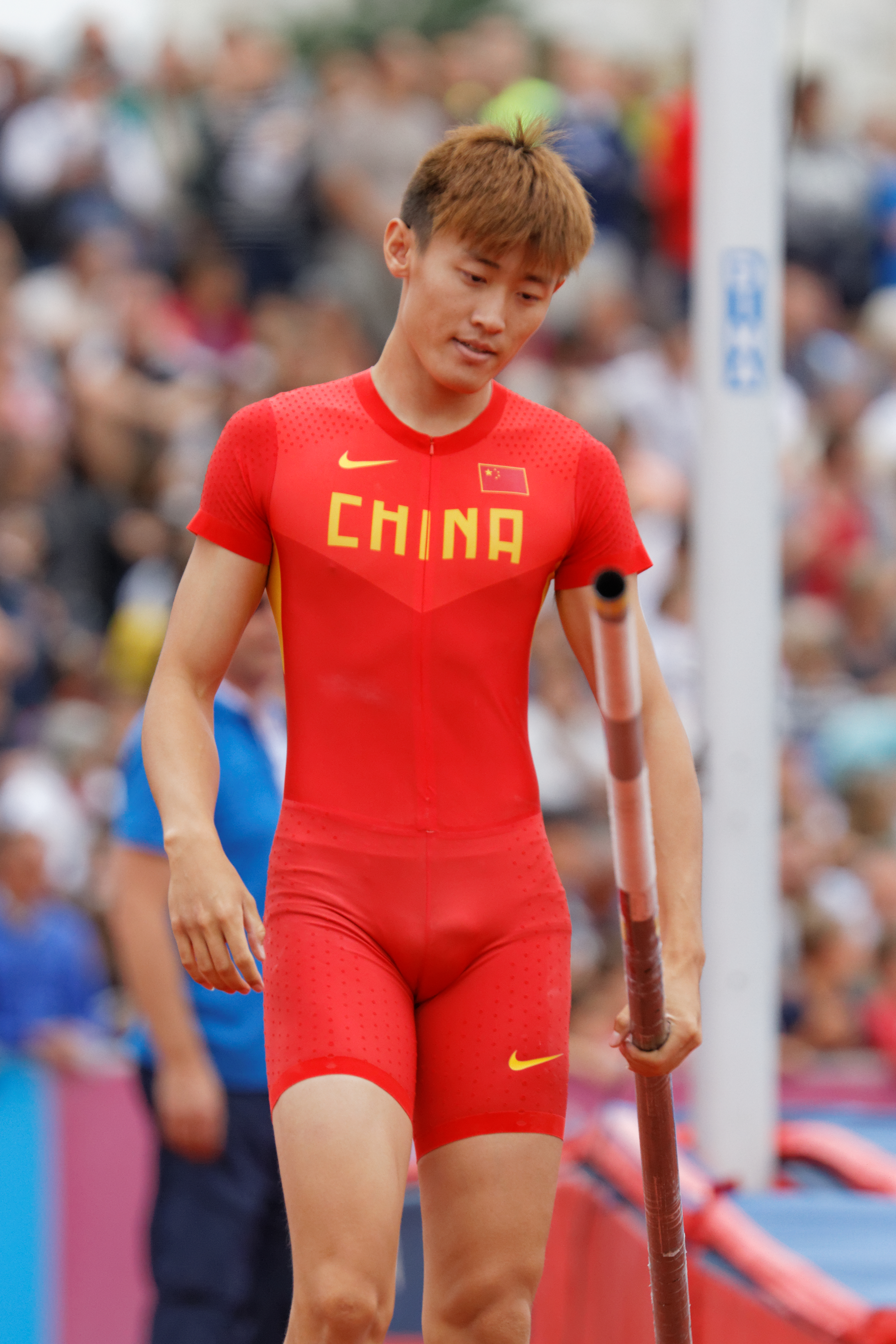
- Xue Changrui in 2014

Personal information
- Born: 31 May 1991 (age 35)
- Height: 1.88 m (6 ft 2 in)
- Weight: 75 kg (165 lb)

Sport
- Country: China
- Sport: Track and field
- Event: Pole vault

Achievements and titles
- Personal bests: Outdoor 5.82 (2017) NR; Indoor 5.81 (2016)
Medal record
Asian Games
Gold medal – first place	2014 Incheon	Pole vault
Asian Championships
Gold medal – first place	2013 Pune	Pole vault

Xue Changrui (Chinese: 薛长锐; born 31 May 1991) is a Chinese track and field athlete who competes in the pole vault. His personal best is 5.82 m. He was the champion at the Asian Athletics Championships in 2013 and at the Asian Games in 2014.

== Career ==
Born in Shandong Province, he originally started out in the long jump and set a best of 7.15 metres at the age of seventeen. He emerged as a pole vaulter in 2011 and after competing on the Chinese Athletics Grand Prix circuit he finished third at the Chinese Athletics Championships with a vault of 5.30 m. He gradually improved in 2012, winning the national Tianjin meet with a clearance of 5.40 m before finishing as runner-up to Yang Yansheng (another Shandong vaulter) at the national championships with a personal best of 5.60 m.

Xue began to establish himself as an elite level vaulter in 2013. Competing abroad for the first time, he achieved a best of 5.75 m in Nevers, France. He was second at the nationals in May but won the Chinese Grand Prix Final with a vault of 5.65 m (an outdoor best). At the 2013 Asian Athletics Championships the conditions for jumping were poor but he dominated the competition, winning the gold medal with 5.60 m, 40 centimetres ahead of runner-up Lu Yao.

On January 19, 2014, at the International Indoor Track and Field Games in New Orleans, France, Xue Changrui won the runner-up in the pole vault with a score of 5.70 meters. On February 5, at the indoor competition in Dijon, France, Xue Changrui won the pole vault championship with a score of 5.75 meters. On May 18, Xue Changrui won the third place in the pole vault with 5.62 meters in the IAAF Diamond League Shanghai Station. On May 21, Xue Changrui won the championship with a jump of 5.80 meters at the IAAF World Athletics Challenge Beijing Station, and broke the Chinese outdoor men's pole vault record of 5.75 meters held by Yang Yansheng. On September 15, at the IAAF Continental Cup held in Marrakesh, Xue Changrui won the men's pole vault silver medal with a score of 5.65 meters. On September 28, in the men's pole vault competition of the Asian Games in Incheon, South Korea, Xue Changrui won the pole vault championship with a score of 5.55 meters.

On May 20, 2015, at the Beijing Station of the World Athletics Challenge held at the Bird's Nest in Beijing, Xue Changrui won the pole vault championship with a time of 5.40 meters.

On January 16, 2016, at the Indoor Pole Vault Classic held in Orleans, France, Xue Changrui won the championship with a score of 5.81 meters and broke the national indoor pole vault record of 5.80 meters held by Yang Yansheng. On June 15, at an international track and field event in Nancy, France, Xue Changrui won the pole vault championship with a score of 5.75 meters. In August, in the men's pole vault final of the Rio de Janeiro Olympics, Xue Changrui finished sixth with 5.65 meters.

He finished fourth at the 2017 World Championships in London, jumping a Chinese record of 5.82 m.

== Competition record ==
Year	Competition	Venue	Position	Notes
Representing China
2013	Asian Championships	Pune, India	1st	5.60 m
2013	World Championships	Moscow, Russia	12th	5.50 m
2014	World Indoor Championships	Sopot, Poland	5th	5.75 m
2014	Asian Games	Incheon, South Korea	1st	5.55 m
2014	Continental Cup	Marrakesh, Morocco	2nd	5.65 m^{1}
2016	Olympic Games	Rio de Janeiro, Brazil	6th	5.65 m
2017	World Championships	London, United Kingdom	4th	5.82 m
2018	World Indoor Championships	Birmingham, United Kingdom	11th	5.60 m

^{1}Representing Asia
