= 2006 Asian Junior Athletics Championships =

12th Asian Junior Championships
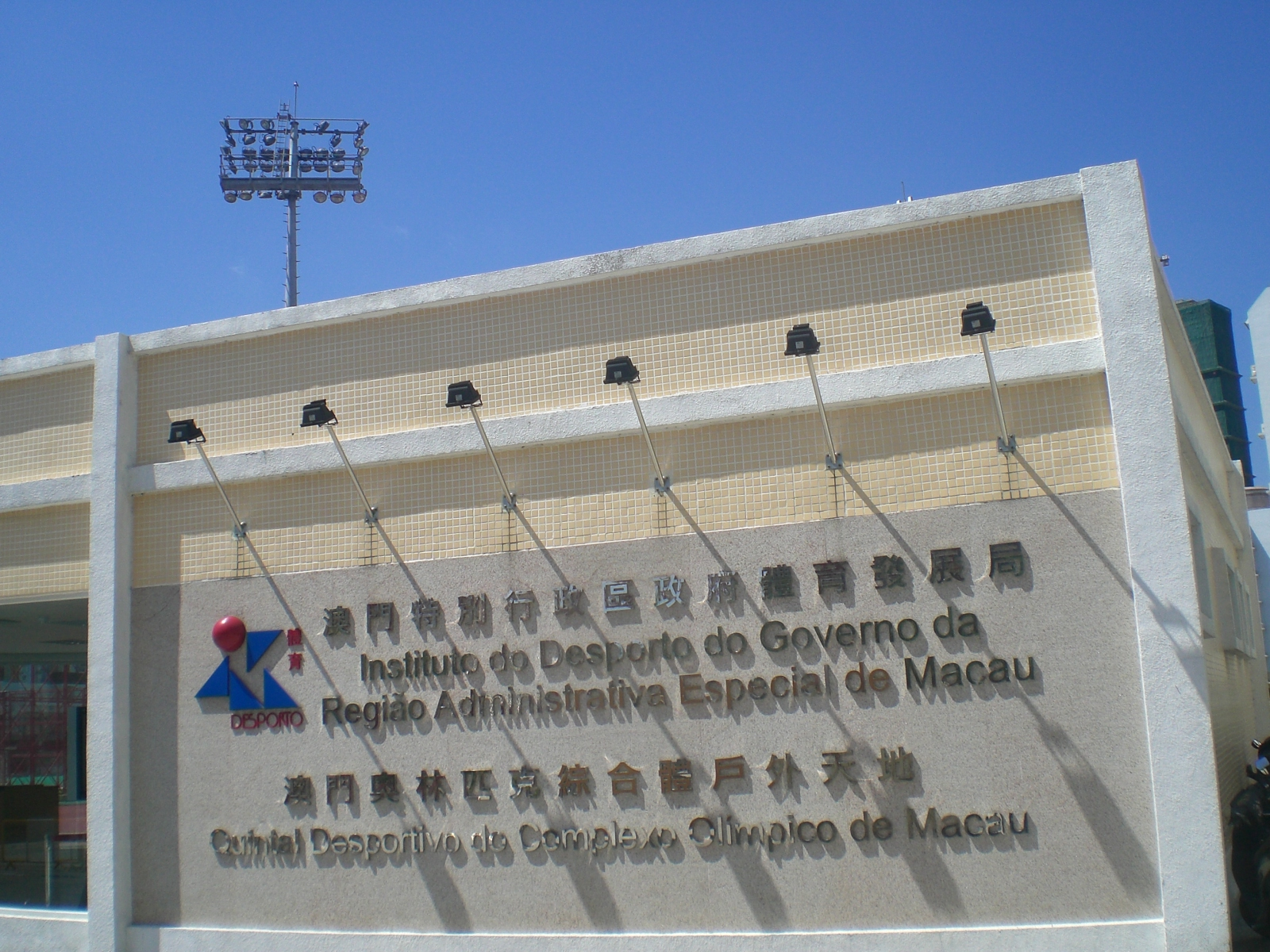
- The exterior of the host stadium
- Dates: 15–18 July
- Host city: Macau, China
- Venue: Macau Stadium
- Level: Junior (under-20)
- Events: 43

The 2006 Asian Junior Athletics Championships was the 12th edition of the international athletics competition for Asian under-20 athletes, organised by the Asian Athletics Association. It took place from 15–18 July at the Macau Stadium in Macau, China. A total of 43 events were contested, which were divided equally between male and female athletes aside from the men's 3000 metres steeplechase.

== Medal summary ==
=== Men ===
Event	Gold		Silver		Bronze	
100 metres	Liang Jiahong (CHN)	10.32	Taweesak Pooltong (THA)	10.51	Takafumi Kumamoto (JPN)	10.57
200 metres	Abdullah Al-Sooli (OMA)	21.44	Mohamed Al-Rawahi (OMA)	21.58	Liu Xiongwei (CHN)	21.78
400 metres	Mohamed Al-Rawahi (OMA)	47.40	Reza Bouazar (IRI)	47.57	Mitsuhiro Abiko (JPN)	47.83
800 metres	Masato Yokota (JPN)	1:51.34	Ali Al-Deraan (KSA)	1:53.03	Sajeesh Joseph (IND)	1:53.36
1500 metres	Thamer Kamal Ali (QAT)	3:49.74	Daiki Sato (JPN)	3:50.89	Mohammad Saleh Rostami (IRI)	3:55.07
5000 metres	Saad Salem Malek (QAT)	14:29.65	Saleh Bakheet (BHR)	14:30.97	Naser Jamal Naser (QAT)	14:32.79
10,000 metres	Mohamed Abduh Bakhet (QAT)	30:25.03	Ali Al-Amri (KSA)	30:25.03	Naser Jamal Naser (QAT)	30:33.62
110 metres hurdles	Huang Hao (CHN)	13.64 CR	Rayzam Wan Sofian (MAS)	13.84	Yan Xu (athlete) (CHN)	13.99
400 metres hurdles	Bandar Yahya Al-Sharahili (KSA)	51.23	Mohamed Daak (KSA)	51.99	Junya Imai (JPN)	52.02
3000 metres steeplechase	Ali Al-Amri (KSA)	8:42.94	Thamer Kamal Ali (QAT)	8:43.09	Saad Salem Malek (QAT)	8:57.86
4 × 100 m relay	Thailand (THA); Srimunta Montree; Taweesak Pooltong; Tawarit Chantaphan; Pratan Parueang	40.30	Oman (Oman); Mohamed Al-Kasbi; Ahmed Nasser Al-Waheibi; Abdullah Al-Sooli; Mohamed Al-Rawahi	40.56	Chinese Taipei (TPE); Liang Tse-Ching; Yi Wei-Chen; Ho Hsien-Tsung; Lin Pao-Tung	40.67
4 × 400 m relay	Japan (JPN); Mitsuhiro Abiko; Akihiro Katsumata; Masato Yokota; Yuzo Kanemaru	3:10.09	Saudi Arabia (KSA); Yonas Al-Hosah; Mohamed Ali Al-Bishi; Bandar Yahya Al-Sharahili; Ismail Al-Sabani	3:11.46	Thailand (THA); Yotsanee Chanwit; Nanin Chaiwut; Wuttichai Nhuanktang; Teerwet Tawanba	3:13.51
10,000 metres walk	Bai Xuejin (CHN)	43:48.91	Hiroyuki Hirano (JPN)	45:43.66	Yusuke Suzuki (JPN)	47:06.99
High jump	Huang Haiqiang (CHN)	2.20 m	Torlarp Sudjanta (THA)	2.18 m	Vitaliy Tsykunov (KAZ)	2.16 m
Pole vault	Yang Yansheng (CHN)	5.30 m CR	Takafumi Suzuki (JPN)	5.20 m	Junya Nagata (JPN)	5.10 m
Long jump	Zhang Xiaoyi (CHN)	7.78 m	Noriyuki Sakurai (JPN)	7.62 m	Mohammad Arzandeh (IRI)	7.59 m
Triple jump	Mohamed Yusuf Salman (BHR)	16.42 m	Varunyoo Kongnil (THA)	15.82 m	Nguyen Manh Hieu (VIE)	15.68 m
Shot put	Wang Like (CHN)	20.17 m	Sourabh Vij (IND)	19.62 m	Meshari Mohammad (KUW)	19.60 m
Discus throw	Mahmoud Samimi (IRI)	61.52 m	Zhang Qun (CHN)	55.60 m	Dong Hao (CHN)	54.29 m
Hammer throw	Wang Yong (CHN)	71.66 m	Zhou Heng (CHN)	68.66 m	Reza Moghaddam (IRI)	64.51 m
Javelin throw	Li Yu (CHN)	74.93 m	Chen Yu-wen (TPE)	71.29 m	Wang Qingbo (CHN)	69.36 m
Decathlon	Zhu Hengjun (CHN)	7316 pts	Liao Shu-Chien (TPE)	6808 pts	Mohamed Al-Qaree (KSA)	6564 pts

=== Women ===
Event	Gold		Silver		Bronze	
100 metres	Nao Okabe (JPN)	11.76	Wang Yaqi (CHN)	11.84	Ayaka Takeuchi (JPN)	12.03
200 metres	Chen Jue (CHN)	24.19	Ghofran Al-Mouhmad (SYR)	24.45	Kunya Harnthong (THA)	24.74
400 metres	Li Xueji (CHN)	53.43	Chen Cuiyu (CHN)	54.80	Irina Zudikhina (UZB)	55.72
800 metres	Tong Xiaomei (CHN)	2:08.10	Kieko Shinada (JPN)	2:09.70	Jhuma Khatun (IND)	2:09.95
1500 metres	Akane Ota (JPN)	4:30.16	Liu Fang (CHN)	4:30.17	Aki Matsunaga (JPN)	4:31.09
3000 metres	Mio Fukahori (JPN)	9:30.59	Kazue Kojima (JPN)	9:30.62	Kim Jong-Hyang (PRK)	9:30.79
5000 metres	Nami Matsuda (JPN)	16:10.95	Kareema Saleh Jasim (BHR)	16:24.28	Kim Jong-Hyang (PRK)	16:49.86
100 metres hurdles	Zhang Hongpei (CHN)	14.09	Natalya Asanova (UZB)	14.24	Azizah Ibrahim (MAS)	14.59
400 metres hurdles	Ghofran Al-Mouhmad (SYR)	57.66	Chen Yumei (CHN)	59.52	Li Ling (CHN)	60.34
4 × 100 m relay	China (CHN); Tao Yujia; Liang Qiuping; Wang Yaqi; Chen Jue	44.95	Japan (JPN); Ayaka Takeuchi; Nao Okabe; Yuka Nagakura; Miyako Kumasaka	45.66	Thailand (THA); Jitladda Kunkaew; Sintara Seangdee; Ketsiri Wongchai; Kunya Harnthong	46.49
4 × 400 m relay	China (CHN); Chen Yumei; Li Ling; Chen Cuiyu; Li Xueji	3:40.37	Thailand (THA); Karat Srimuang; Treewadee Yongphan; Krittaporn Pengsut; Kunya Harnthong	3:44.61	India (IND); Mandeep Kaur; Sini Jose; Anu Mariam Jose; Machettira Poovamma	3:45.36
10,000 metres walk	Li Cui (CHN)	49:28.11	Chai Xue (CHN)	49:28.45	Fumika Kiryu (JPN)	50:08.14
High jump	Svetlana Radzivil (UZB)	1.90 m CR	Yekaterina Yevseyeva (KAZ)	1.88 m	Nadiya Dusanova (UZB)	1.84 m
Pole vault	Zhang Yingning (CHN)	4.20 m =CR	Noor Akma Abdul Fatah (MAS)	3.40 m	Ruchi Tewari (IND)	3.00 m
Long jump	Aleksandra Kotlyarova (UZB)	6.02 m	Hitomi Nakano (JPN)	5.94 m	Rima Taha (JOR)	5.92 m
Triple jump	Anna Bondarenko (KAZ)	13.18 m	Tao Yujia (CHN)	13.07 m	Irina Litvinenko (KAZ)	13.03 m
Shot put	Li Li (CHN)	16.78 m	Oksana Kot (UZB)	14.94 m	Izumi Yoshida (JPN)	14.35 m
Discus throw	Tan Jian (CHN)	55.74 m	Wang Bin (CHN)	55.41 m	Narumi Ejima (JPN)	48.20 m
Hammer throw	Wang Zheng (CHN)	60.16 m	Wang Yang (CHN)	59.33 m	Galina Mityaeva (TJK)	52.55 m
Javelin throw	Zhu Jingya (CHN)	55.54 m	Zhang Ying (CHN)	55.14 m	Momoko Matsumoto (JPN)	53.19 m
Heptathlon	Wei Xiaobin (CHN)	4968 pts	Olga Lapina (KAZ)	4882 pts	Anastasya Kudinova (KAZ)	4734 pts

== 2006 Medal Table ==
Rank	Nation	Gold	Silver	Bronze	Total
1	China (CHN)	23	11	5	39
2	Japan (JPN)	6	8	11	25
3	Qatar (QAT)	3	1	3	7
4	Saudi Arabia (KSA)	2	4	1	7
5	Uzbekistan (UZB)	2	2	1	5
6	Oman (OMA)	2	2	0	4
7	Thailand (THA)	1	4	3	8
8	Kazakhstan (KAZ)	1	2	3	6
9	Bahrain (BHR)	1	2	0	3
10	Iran (IRI)	1	1	3	5
11	Syria (SYR)	1	1	0	2
12	Chinese Taipei (TPE)	0	2	1	3
12	Malaysia (MAS)	0	2	1	3
14	India (IND)	0	1	4	5
15	North Korea (PRK)	0	0	2	2
16	Jordan (JOR)	0	0	1	1
16	Kuwait (KUW)	0	0	1	1
16	Tajikistan (TJK)	0	0	1	1
16	Vietnam (VIE)	0	0	1	1
Totals (19 entries)		43	43	42	128
