= Athletics at the 2009 Summer Universiade – Men's pole vault =

The men's pole vault event at the 2009 Summer Universiade was held on 9–11 July.

== Medalists ==
Gold	Silver	Bronze
Aleksandr Gripich; Russia	Giorgio Piantella; Italy	Hendrik Gruber; Germany

== Results ==
=== Qualification ===
Qualification: 5.30 m (Q) or at least 12 best (q) qualified for the final.

Rank	Group	Athlete	Nationality	4.90	5.00	5.10	5.20	Result	Notes
1	A	Aleksandr Gripich	Russia	–	-	o	o	5.20	q
1	A	Tobias Scherbarth	Germany	–	-	-	o	5.20	q
1	B	Konstadinos Filippidis	Greece	–	o	o	o	5.20	q
4	A	Andrej Poljanec	Slovenia	–	o	xo	o	5.20	q
4	B	Jason Wurster	Canada	–	–	xo	o	5.20	q
6	B	Miroslav Telecký	Czech Republic	–	xxo	–	o	5.20	q
7	B	Hendrik Gruber	Germany	–	–	–	xo	5.20	q
8	B	Joel Pocklington	Australia	o	o	o	xo	5.20	q
9	B	Takafumi Suzuki	Japan	–	–	–	xxo	5.20	q
10	A	Giorgio Piantella	Italy	–	x–	o	xxo	5.20	q
11	A	Oleksandr Korchmid	Ukraine	–	–	o	–	5.10	q
12	A	Blake Lucas	Australia	o	–	xo	xx–	5.10	q
13	B	Kārlis Pujāts	Latvia	xxo	xxo	xxx		5.00	
14	A	Hsieh Chia-Han	Chinese Taipei	o	xxx			4.90	
15	B	Eshagh Ghaffari	Iran	xxo	xxx			4.90	
	A	Hiroki Ogita	Japan	–	–	–	xxx	NM	
	A	Nikolaos Syntchakis	Greece	xxx				NM	

=== Final ===
Rank	Athlete	Nationality	4.95	5.05	5.15	5.25	5.35	5.40	5.45	5.50	5.55	5.60	5.65	5.70	Result	Notes
1st place, gold medalist(s)	Aleksandr Gripich	Russia	–	–	o	–	o	–	o	–	o	xo	–	xxx	5.60	
2nd place, silver medalist(s)	Giorgio Piantella	Italy	–	–	xo	–	xo	–	xo	xo	xo	xx–	x		5.55	
3rd place, bronze medalist(s)	Hendrik Gruber	Germany	–	–	–	o	o	–	xo	–	x–	xx			5.45	
4	Oleksandr Korchmid	Ukraine	–	–	–	–	–	o	–	xxx					5.40	
5	Andrej Poljanec	Slovenia	–	o	–	xo	–	o	–	xxx					5.40	
6	Jason Wurster	Canada	–	–	–	xxo	–	o	–	xxx					5.40	SB
7	Miroslav Telecký	Czech Republic	–	o	o	xo	xo	–	xxx						5.35	
8	Takafumi Suzuki	Japan	–	–	–	xo	–	xxx							5.25	
9	Konstadinos Filippidis	Greece	–	–	o	–	xxx								5.15	
10	Blake Lucas	Australia	o	–	o	–	xxx								5.15	
11	Joel Pocklington	Australia	o	–	xxx										4.95	
	Tobias Scherbarth	Germany													DNS	
