= 2009 Asian Athletics Championships – Men's pole vault =

The men's pole vault event at the 2009 Asian Athletics Championships was held at the Guangdong Olympic Stadium on November 11.

== Results ==
| Rank | Athlete | Nationality | 4.80 | 5.00 | 5.15 | 5.30 | 5.45 | 5.60 | 5.80 | Result | Notes |
|---|---|---|---|---|---|---|---|---|---|---|---|
| 1st place, gold medalist(s) | Liu Feiliang | China | – | – | – | o | xo | o | xxx | 5.60 | |
| 2nd place, silver medalist(s) | Yang Quan | China | – | – | o | xo | o | xxx | | 5.45 | SB |
| 3rd place, bronze medalist(s) | Daichi Sawano | Japan | – | – | – | – | xo | xxx | | 5.45 | |
| 4 | Leonid Andreev | Uzbekistan | – | – | – | o | xxo | xxx | | 5.45 | |
| 5 | Takafumi Suzuki | Japan | – | – | xo | xxx | | | | 5.15 | |
| 6 | Mohsen Rabbani | Iran | – | xo | xxo | xxx | | | | 5.15 | |
| 7 | Ali Al-Sabaghah | Kuwait | o | o | xxx | | | | | 5.00 | |
| 8 | Hsieh Chia-han | Chinese Taipei | xo | o | xxx | | | | | 5.00 | |
| 9 | Fahad Al-Mershad | Kuwait | o | xxx | | | | | | 4.80 | |
