= 2014 World Junior Championships in Athletics – Women's shot put =

The women's shot put event at the 2014 World Junior Championships in Athletics was held in Eugene, Oregon, USA, at Hayward Field on 25 July.

== Medalists ==
Gold	Guo Tianqian; China
Silver	Raven Saunders; United States
Bronze	Emel Dereli; Turkey

== Results ==
=== Final ===
25 July
Start time: 18:32 Temperature: 28 °C Humidity: 33 %
End time: 19:28 Temperature: 27 °C Humidity: 37 %

Rank	Name	Nationality	Attempts						Result	Notes
Rank	Name	Nationality	1	2	3	4	5	6	Result	Notes
1st place, gold medalist(s)	Guo Tianqian	China	16.96	17.29	17.21	17.71	17.52	17.29	17.71	
2nd place, silver medalist(s)	Raven Saunders	United States	14.38	16.36	15.48	15.48	15.85	16.63	16.63	
3rd place, bronze medalist(s)	Emel Dereli	Turkey	x	16.55	16.41	16.45	16.50	16.28	16.55	
4	Xu Jiaqi	China	x	16.32	x	15.82	15.85	15.94	16.32	
5	Klaudia Kardasz	Poland	16.06	16.29	15.60	16.16	x	15.79	16.29	PB
6	Fanny Roos	Sweden	15.50	15.68	15.83	15.78	x	16.29	16.29	NJR
7	Elena Bezruchenko	Russia	15.98	16.24	15.80	15.66	16.10	16.24	16.24	PB
8	Lezaan Jordaan	South Africa	15.44	15.79	16.14	15.30	16.15	x	16.15	PB
9	Saily Viart	Cuba	15.62	x	x				15.62	
10	Kätlin Piirimäe	Estonia	15.48	x	15.49				15.49	
11	Nwanneka Okwelogu	Nigeria	14.58	14.77	14.51				14.77	
12	Laura Jokeit	Germany	14.61	x	14.37				14.61	

=== Qualifications ===
25 July
With qualifying standard of 15.80 (Q) or at least the 12 best performers (q) advance to the Final

==== Summary ====
Rank	Name	Nationality	Result	Notes
1	Raven Saunders	United States	16.73	Q
2	Guo Tianqian	China	16.59	Q
3	Emel Dereli	Turkey	16.15	Q
4	Fanny Roos	Sweden	16.03	Q
5	Saily Viart	Cuba	15.95	Q
6	Klaudia Kardasz	Poland	15.94	Q
7	Lezaan Jordaan	South Africa	15.82	Q
8	Elena Bezruchenko	Russia	15.81	Q
9	Laura Jokeit	Germany	15.33	q
10	Nwanneka Okwelogu	Nigeria	15.13	q
11	Kätlin Piirimäe	Estonia	15.09	q
12	Xu Jiaqi	China	15.08	q
13	Alina Kenzel	Germany	14.86	
14	Lee Mina	South Korea	14.85	SB
15	Lenuta Burueana	Romania	14.54	
16	Izabela da Silva	Brazil	14.54	
17	Alena Pasechnik	Belarus	14.48	
18	Grace Conley	Bolivia	14.30	SB
19	Noora Salem Jasim	Bahrain	14.28	
20	Portious Warren	Trinidad and Tobago	14.22	
21	Jess St. John	Antigua and Barbuda	14.00	
22	Gleneve Grange	Jamaica	13.95	
23	Cecilia Rodríguez	Uruguay	13.88	
24	Rochelle Frazer	Jamaica	13.78	
25	Stéphanie Krumlovsky	Luxembourg	13.70	
26	María Fernanda Orozco	Mexico	13.44	
27	Chiang Ru-Ching	Chinese Taipei	13.32	
28	Yohana Vargas	Venezuela	13.21	
29	Manca Avbelj	Slovenia	13.20	
30	Lisette Liivrand	Estonia	13.12	
31	Mentallah Mustafa Mohamed Elnahrawy	Egypt	12.85	
	Katelyn Daniels	United States	DNS	

==== Details ====
With qualifying standard of 15.80 (Q) or at least the 12 best performers (q) advance to the Final

===== Group A =====
25 July
Start time; 10:09 Temperature: 14 °C Humidity: 82 %
End time: 10:46 Temperature: 18 °C Humidity: 64 %

Rank	Name	Nationality	Attempts			Result	Notes
Rank	Name	Nationality	1	2	3	Result	Notes
1	Guo Tianqian	China	16.59			16.59	Q
2	Fanny Roos	Sweden	14.86	16.03		16.03	Q
3	Saily Viart	Cuba	15.95			15.95	Q
4	Elena Bezruchenko	Russia	15.55	15.81		15.81	Q
5	Laura Jokeit	Germany	14.98	14.90	15.33	15.33	q
6	Nwanneka Okwelogu	Nigeria	14.67	14.86	15.13	15.13	q
7	Kätlin Piirimäe	Estonia	15.09	x	x	15.09	q
8	Lenuta Burueana	Romania	x	14.54	14.43	14.54	
9	Grace Conley	Bolivia	14.00	14.19	14.30	14.30	SB
10	Portious Warren	Trinidad and Tobago	13.22	13.16	14.22	14.22	
11	Cecilia Rodríguez	Uruguay	13.88	12.41	12.46	13.88	
12	Rochelle Frazer	Jamaica	12.35	13.78	12.92	13.78	
13	Chiang Ru-Ching	Chinese Taipei	x	13.02	13.32	13.32	
14	Yohana Vargas	Venezuela	13.16	13.21	13.18	13.21	
15	Mentallah Mustafa Mohamed Elnahrawy	Egypt	12.85	12.75	12.22	12.85	
	Katelyn Daniels	United States				DNS	

===== Group B =====
25 July
Start time; 10:10 Temperature: 14 °C Humidity: 82 %
End time: 10:49 Temperature: 18 °C Humidity: 64 %

Rank	Name	Nationality	Attempts			Result	Notes
Rank	Name	Nationality	1	2	3	Result	Notes
1	Raven Saunders	United States	15.64	16.73		16.73	Q
2	Emel Dereli	Turkey	16.15			16.15	Q
3	Klaudia Kardasz	Poland	13.65	15.65	15.94	15.94	Q
4	Lezaan Jordaan	South Africa	15.31	15.82		15.82	Q
5	Xu Jiaqi	China	13.80	15.08	x	15.08	q
6	Alina Kenzel	Germany	13.56	14.21	14.86	14.86	
7	Lee Mina	South Korea	14.85	x	x	14.85	SB
8	Izabela da Silva	Brazil	14.54	-	-	14.54	
9	Alena Pasechnik	Belarus	14.48	x	x	14.48	
10	Noora Salem Jasim	Bahrain	14.25	14.18	14.28	14.28	
11	Jess St. John	Antigua and Barbuda	14.00	13.83	13.57	14.00	
12	Gleneve Grange	Jamaica	13.78	x	13.95	13.95	
13	Stéphanie Krumlovsky	Luxembourg	13.56	13.70	13.40	13.70	
14	María Fernanda Orozco	Mexico	x	x	13.44	13.44	
15	Manca Avbelj	Slovenia	13.16	13.20	13.14	13.20	
16	Lisette Liivrand	Estonia	x	12.99	13.12	13.12	

== Participation ==
According to an unofficial count, 31 athletes from 27 countries participated in the event.

- Antigua and Barbuda (1)
- Bahrain (1)
- Belarus (1)
- Bolivia (1)
- Brazil (1)
- China (2)
- Chinese Taipei (1)
- Cuba (1)
- Egypt (1)
- Estonia (2)
- Germany (2)
- Jamaica (2)
- Luxembourg (1)
- Mexico (1)
- Nigeria (1)
- Poland (1)
- Romania (1)
- Russia (1)
- Slovenia (1)
- South Africa (1)
- South Korea (1)
- Sweden (1)
- Trinidad and Tobago (1)
- Turkey (1)
- United States (1)
- Uruguay (1)
- Venezuela (1)
