= Athletics at the 2022 Asian Games – Women's shot put =

Women's shot put at the 2022 Asian Games
- Venue: Hangzhou Olympic Expo Main Stadium
- Date: 29 September 2023
- Competitors: 12 from 8 nations

Medalists
gold medal	Gong Lijiao	China
silver medal	Song Jiayuan	China
bronze medal	Kiran Baliyan	India

The women's shot put competition at the 2022 Asian Games took place on 29 September 2023 at the HOC Stadium, Hangzhou.

== Schedule ==
All times are China Standard Time (UTC+08:00)

Date	Time	Event
Friday, 29 September 2023	20:45	Final

== Records ==
Prior to this competition, the existing world, Asian and Games records were as follows.

World Record	Natalya Lisovskaya (URS)	22.63	Moscow, Soviet Union	7 June 1987
Asian Record	Li Meisu (CHN)	21.76	Shijiazhuang, China	23 April 1988
Games Record	Sui Xinmei (CHN)	20.55	Beijing, China	1 October 1990

== Results ==
Legend

- DNS — Did not start

Rank	Athlete	Attempt						Result	Notes
Rank	Athlete	1	2	3	4	5	6	Result	Notes
1st place, gold medalist(s)	Gong Lijiao (CHN)	18.73	19.12	19.38	19.58	19.52	19.33	19.58	
2nd place, silver medalist(s)	Song Jiayuan (CHN)	17.88	18.12	18.92	18.91	X	18.29	18.92	
3rd place, bronze medalist(s)	Kiran Baliyan (IND)	15.42	16.84	17.36	16.76	16.79	16.87	17.36	
4	Jian Chen-xin (TPE)	14.96	14.57	15.43	15.70	16.61	15.87	16.61	
5	Manpreet Kaur (IND)	16.25	15.63	X	X	15.33	15.71	16.25	
6	Lee Soo-jung (KOR)	16.21	16.09	15.04	16.11	X	14.49	16.21	
7	Jeong Yu-sun (KOR)	X	15.57	15.41	15.93	16.00	15.31	16.00	
8	Areerat Intadis (THA)	14.22	15.24	15.43	15.27	15.12	15.50	15.50	
9	Noora Salem Jasim (BRN)	15.13	X	14.40				15.13	
10	Eki Febri Ekawati (INA)	15.10	14.89	14.95				15.10	
11	Wu Ci-en (TPE)	14.78	14.54	14.80				14.80	
—	Fatima Al-Hosani (UAE)							DNS	
