= Athletics at the 2002 Asian Games – Men's pole vault =

Men's pole vault at the 2002 Asian Games
- Venue: Busan Asiad Main Stadium
- Date: 8 October 2002
- Competitors: 7 from 5 nations

Medalists
gold medal	Grigoriy Yegorov	Kazakhstan
silver medal	Satoru Yasuda	Japan
bronze medal	Fumiaki Kobayashi	Japan

The men's pole vault competition at the 2002 Asian Games in Busan, South Korea was held on 8 October at the Busan Asiad Main Stadium.

== Schedule ==
All times are Korea Standard Time (UTC+09:00)

Date	Time	Event
Tuesday, 8 October 2002	15:00	Final

== Records ==
Prior to this competition, the existing world, Asian and Games records were as follows.

World Record	Sergey Bubka (UKR)	6.14	Sestriere, Italy	31 July 1994
Asian Record	Grigoriy Yegorov (KAZ); Grigoriy Yegorov (KAZ); Igor Potapovich (KAZ)	5.90	Stuttgart, Germany; London, United Kingdom; Nice, France	19 August 1993; 10 September 1993; 10 July 1996
Games Record	Igor Potapovich (KAZ)	5.65	Hiroshima, Japan	14 October 1994

== Results ==
Legend

- DNS — Did not start
- NM — No mark

Rank	Athlete	Attempt								Result	Notes
Rank	Athlete	4.60	4.80	5.00	5.10	5.20	5.30	5.40	5.50	Result	Notes
1st place, gold medalist(s)	Grigoriy Yegorov (KAZ)	–	–	–	–	O	XO	XO	XXX	5.40	
2nd place, silver medalist(s)	Satoru Yasuda (JPN)	–	–	–	–	XXO	O	XXO	XXX	5.40	
3rd place, bronze medalist(s)	Fumiaki Kobayashi (JPN)	–	–	–	–	XO	XXX			5.20	
4	Yang Mu-hui (TPE)	–	O	O	–	XXX				5.00	
5	Kim Se-in (KOR)	–	XO	O	–	XXX				5.00	
—	Park Kyung-soo (KOR)	–	XXX							NM	
—	Leonid Andreev (UZB)									DNS	
