= 2013 Asian Athletics Championships – Men's pole vault =

The men's pole vault at the 2013 Asian Athletics Championships was held at the Shree Shiv Chhatrapati Sports Complex on 7 July.

== Results ==
Rank	Name	Nationality	4.70	4.90	5.10	5.20	5.30	5.40	5.60	5.76	Result	Notes
1st place, gold medalist(s)	Xue Changrui	China	–	–	–	o	–	o	o	xxx	5.60	
2nd place, silver medalist(s)	Lu Yao	China	–	–	o	o	xxx				5.20	
3rd place, bronze medalist(s)	Jin Min-Sub	South Korea	–	–	–	xo	xxx				5.20	
4	Baurzhan Serikbayev	Kazakhstan	–	o	xo	xo	xxx				5.20	
5	Ryo Tanaka	Japan	o	o	xxo	xxx					5.10	
5	Hsieh Chia-Han	Chinese Taipei	–	o	xxo	xxx					5.10	
7	Kreeta Sintawacheewa	Thailand	o	xo	xxx						4.90	
7	Balakrishna P.	India	o	xo	xxx						4.90	
9	Sompong Saombankuay	Thailand	xo	xxx							4.70	
9	Iskandar Alwi	Malaysia	xo	xxx							4.70	
	Mohsen Rabbani	Iran	–	xxx							NM	
	Praveen Kumar	India	xxx								NM	
