= Manpreet Kaur =

Indian shot putter (born 1990)

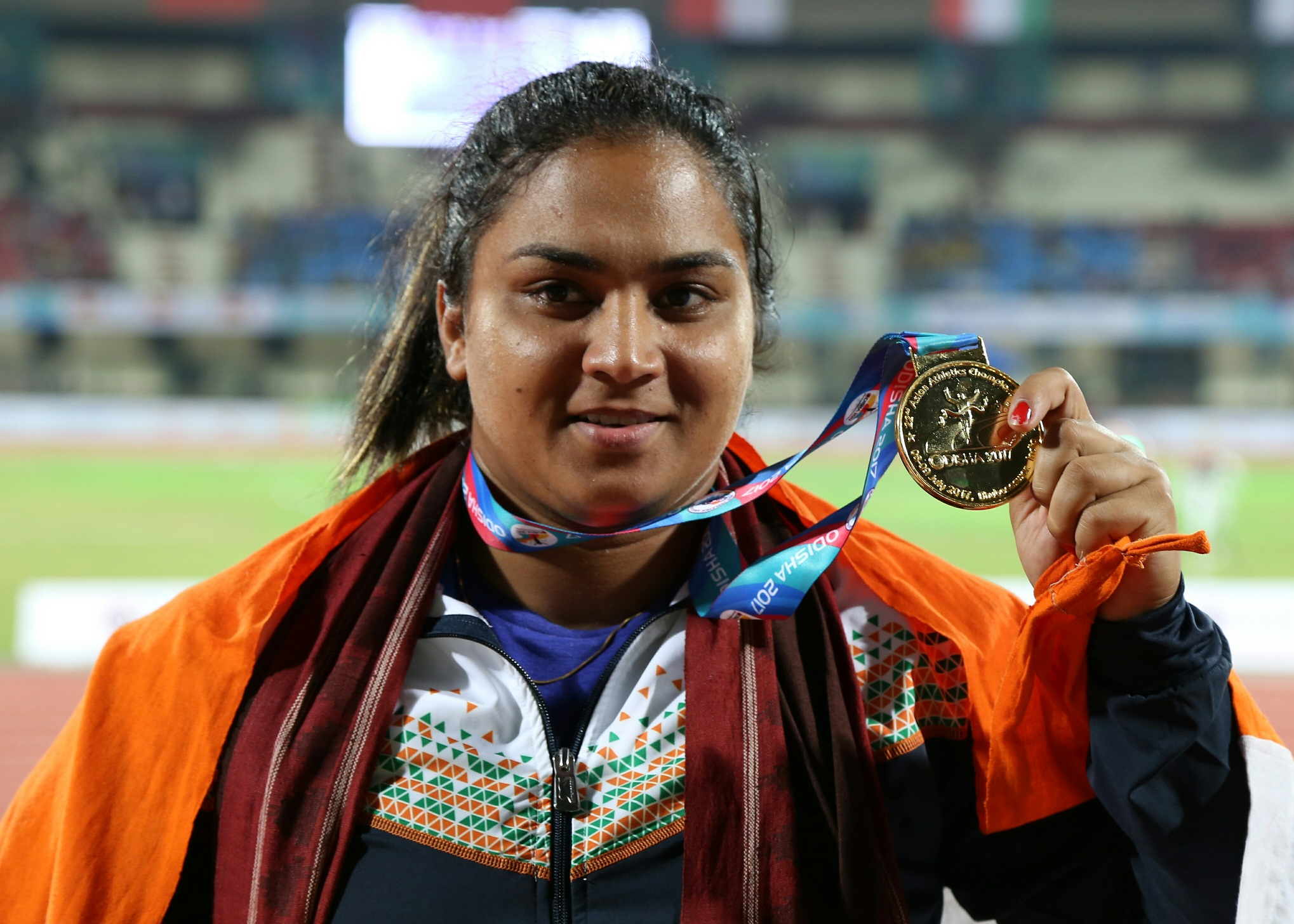
- Kaur in 2017

Personal information
- Born: 6 July 1990 (age 36) Sahauli, Punjab, India
- Height: 1.70 m (5 ft 7 in)

Sport
- Sport: Athletics
- Event: Shot put

Achievements and titles
- Personal best: 18.06 m (2022)
Medal record
Women's athletics
Representing India
Asian Games
| Bronze medal – third place | 2026 Aichi–Nagoya | Shot put |
Asian Championships
| Bronze medal – third place | 2023 Bangkok | Shot put |
South Asian Games
| Gold medal – first place | 2016 Guwahati | Shot put |
South Asian Junior Championships
| Gold medal – first place | 2007 Colombo | Shot put |

Manpreet Kaur (born 6 July 1990) is an Indian shot putter. She has won bronze medals at the 2026 Asian Games and 2023 Asian Championships, and gold medal at the 2019 South Asian Games.

== Early life ==
Kaur hails from Sahauli village in Patiala district of Punjab, and is the eldest of three siblings. When she was 13 years old, her father died. Her mother was paralyzed in 2006. She developed an interest in athletics through her father and cousins who were into sports. One of her cousins was a university-level 100 m sprinter and other was a discus thrower, while her sister-in-law was also a shot putter. She initially trained for a year in the 100 m, but her brother whom she trained under felt she would do better in shot put and she switched.

== Career ==
Kaur made her international debut at the 2006 Asian Junior Championships in Macau, where she finished eighth with a throw of 12.41 m.

At the 2007 World Youth Championships in Ostrava, she finished ninth with a throw of 13.57 m. She won the gold medal at the 2007 South Asian Junior Championships in Colombo, with a best effort of 13.76 m.

She placed sixth at the 2008 Commonwealth Youth Games in Pune with a throw of 13.60 m, and later finished ninth at the 2010 Commonwealth Games in Delhi, with a throw of 14.50 m.

At the 2016 South Asian Games in Guwahati, she won the gold medal with a throw of 17.94 m. She placed sixth at the 2016 Asian Indoor Championships in Doha, with a 15.21 m throw. At the 2016 Rio Olympics, she finished 23rd among 36 athletes in the qualification round with a throw of 17.06 m and failed to advance to the final.

In the first leg of the 2017 Asian Grand Prix in Jinhua, she clinched the gold medal with a national record and world season-leading effort of 18.86 m. She won the gold medal with a 18.28 m throw at the 2017 Asian Championships in Bhubaneswar. She was later disqualified following four doping violations in the 2017 season, after testing positive for Metenolone at the Asian Grand Prix and for Dimethylbutylamine, at the Federation Cup, Asian Championships and Inter-State Championships. She was handed a four-year ban beginning 20 July 2017, and as a consequence she had to forfeit her gold medals and national record. She returned to competition after the ban ended.

She placed eleventh at the 2022 Commonwealth Games in Birmingham, with a throw of 15.59 m.

At the 2023 Asian Championships in Bangkok, she won the bronze medal with a throw of 17.00 m. Later, at the Asian Games in Hangzhou, she finished fifth with a throw of 16.25 m.

She competed at the 2026 Commonwealth Games in Glasgow, throwing 17.49 m she narrowly missed the podium with a fourth-place finish. At the 2026 Asian Games in Nagoya, she won the bronze medal with a throw of 17.17 m, becoming only the third Indian woman to win an Asiad shot put medal after Barbara Webster (1951) and Kiran Baliyan (2023).

== International competitions ==
Representing India
| Year | Competition | Host | Position | Result |
|---|---|---|---|---|
| 2006 | Asian Junior Championships | Macau, China | 8th | 12.41 m |
| 2007 | World Youth Championships | Ostrava, Czech Republic | 9th | 13.57 m |
| 2007 | South Asian Junior Championships | Colombo, Sri Lanka | 1st | 13.76 m |
| 2008 | Commonwealth Youth Games | Pune, India | 6th | 13.60 m |
| 2010 | Commonwealth Games | Delhi, India | 9th | 14.50 m |
| 2016 | South Asian Games | Guwahati, India | 1st | 17.94 m |
| 2016 | Asian Indoor Championships | Doha, Qatar | 6th | 15.21 m |
| 2016 | Olympic Games | Rio, Brazil | 23rd (Q) | 17.06 m |
| 2017 | Asian Championships | Bhubaneswar, India | DQ [40.1] | ~~18.28 m~~ |
| 2022 | Commonwealth Games | Birmingham, England | 11th | 15.59 m |
| 2023 | Asian Championships | Bangkok, Thailand | 3rd | 17.00 m |
| 2023 | Asian Games | Hangzhou, China | 5th | 16.25 m |
| 2026 | Commonwealth Games | Glasgow, Scotland | 4th | 17.49 m |
| 2026 | Asian Games | Nagoya, Japan | 3rd | 17.17 m |

== Personal life ==
Kaur is married to Karamjeet Singh, a university level shot putter who is also her trainer and the couple have a daughter.

She is employed as chief office superintendent at the Patiala Locomotive Works, a unit of the Indian Railways.
