= Zhang Hongwei =

Zhang Hongwei may refer to:

- Zhang Hongwei (Paralympian)
- Zhang Hongwei (pole vaulter)
