= Lee Fu-an =

Taiwanese decathlete

Medal record

Men's athletics

Representing Chinese Taipei

Asian Championships
Gold medal – first place	1983 Kuwait	Decathlon
Gold medal – first place	1989 New Delhi	Decathlon
Silver medal – second place	1985 Jakarta	Decathlon
Bronze medal – third place	1987 Singapore	Decathlon

East Asian Games
Bronze medal – third place	1993 Shanghai	Decathlon

Lee Fu-an (Chinese: 李福恩; pinyin: Lǐ Fú'ēn; born 4 June 1964) is a Taiwanese decathlete. In 1990, he set a national record for the pole vault at 5.30 meters. Hsieh Chia-han beat the record by one centimeter in 2011.

Lee twice competed once at the World Championships in Athletics, doing so in 1987, though he failed to complete all ten events. He was twice champion at the Asian Athletics Championships, winning the gold medal at the 1983 and 1989 editions. He was the first man from Taiwan to win that title and was shortly after succeeded by his compatriot Ku Chin-shui.
