= Athletics at the 2014 Asian Games – Women's shot put =

Women's shot put at the 2014 Asian Games
- Venue: Incheon Asiad Main Stadium
- Dates: 27 September 2014
- Competitors: 10 from 8 nations

Medalists
gold medal	Gong Lijiao	China
silver medal	Leila Rajabi	Iran
bronze medal	Guo Tianqian	China

The women's shot put event at the 2014 Asian Games was held at the Incheon Asiad Main Stadium, Incheon, South Korea on 27 September.

== Schedule ==
All times are Korea Standard Time (UTC+09:00)

Date	Time	Event
Saturday, 27 September 2014	19:30	Final

== Records ==
Prior to this competition, the existing world, Asian and Games records were as follows.

World Record	Natalya Lisovskaya (URS)	22.63	Moscow, Soviet Union	7 June 1987
Asian Record	Li Meisu (CHN)	21.76	Shijiazhuang, China	23 April 1988
Games Record	Sui Xinmei (CHN)	20.55	Beijing, China	1 October 1990

== Results ==
Rank	Athlete	Attempt						Result	Notes
Rank	Athlete	1	2	3	4	5	6	Result	Notes
1st place, gold medalist(s)	Gong Lijiao (CHN)	18.57	19.06	X	X	X	18.96	19.06	
2nd place, silver medalist(s)	Leila Rajabi (IRI)	16.90	16.97	17.58	17.80	17.79	17.66	17.80	
3rd place, bronze medalist(s)	Guo Tianqian (CHN)	17.31	17.24	X	X	16.55	17.52	17.52	
4	Lin Chia-ying (TPE)	X	X	17.48	X	17.30	X	17.48	
5	Safiya Burkhanova (UZB)	16.47	15.51	16.48	X	16.35	16.95	16.95	
6	Lee Mi-young (KOR)	X	X	16.44	16.65	X	X	16.65	
7	Elena Smolyanova (UZB)	14.92	X	15.26	X	15.45	15.08	15.45	
8	Noora Salem Jasim (BRN)	14.43	14.52	14.05	15.16	13.46	14.44	15.16	
9	Pürveegiin Maamuu (MGL)	13.37	13.44	13.96				13.96	
10	Asraar Al-Mannai (QAT)	10.39	10.76	10.91				10.91	
