= 2007 Asian Athletics Championships – Men's pole vault =

The men's pole vault event at the 2007 Asian Athletics Championships was held in Amman, Jordan on July 27.

== Results ==
Rank	Name	Nationality	Result	Notes
1st place, gold medalist(s)	Mohsen Rabbani	Iran	5.35	
2nd place, silver medalist(s)	Kim Do-Kyun	South Korea	5.25	
3rd place, bronze medalist(s)	Takafumi Suzuki	Japan	5.10	
4	Ali Makki Al-Sabagha	Kuwait	5.00	
5	Abdulla Ghanim Saeed	Qatar	4.80	
6	Taher Al-Zaboon	Jordan	4.80	
7	Mohamed Al-Malia Khalaf	Syria	4.30	
	Yang Quan	China	NM	
	Masafumi Moribe	Japan	NM	
	Rifat Artikov	Uzbekistan	NM	
