= Kim Se-in =

South Korean pole vaulter

Personal information
- Born: 29 July 1974 (age 52)

Sport
- Sport: Track and field
Medal record
Representing South Korea
Asian Championships
Silver medal – second place	2002 Colombo	Pole vault
Bronze medal – third place	2003 Manila	Pole vault

Kim Se-In (born 29 July 1974) is a South Korean pole vaulter.

His personal best jump is 5.40 metres, achieved at the 2002 Asian Championships in Colombo.

== Achievements ==
Year	Competition	Venue	Position	Notes
Representing South Korea
1992	World Junior Championships	Seoul, South Korea	—	NH
1999	Universiade	Palma, Spain	15th (q)	4.80 m
2000	Asian Championships	Jakarta, Indonesia	4th	5.00 m
2002	Asian Championships	Colombo, Sri Lanka	2nd	5.40 m (PB)
2002	Asian Games	Busan, South Korea	5th	5.00 m
2003	Asian Championships	Manila, Philippines	3rd	5.10 m
2005	Asian Championships	Incheon, South Korea	–	NM
2006	Asian Games	Doha, Qatar	7th	4.90 m
