= Hendrik Gruber =

German pole vaulter

Personal information
- Nationality: German
- Born: September 28, 1986
- Height: 192 cm (6 ft 3 1/2 in)
- Weight: 82 kg (181 lb)

Sport
- Sport: Athletics
- Event: Pole vault
- Club: TSV Bayer o4 Leverkusen

Achievements and titles
- Personal bests: PV (outdoor): 5.70m (2010); PV (indoor): 5.75m (2013)
Medal record
Men's athletics
Representing Germany
International athletics competitions
World University Games
Bronze medal – third place	2009 Belgrade	Pole vault
European Team Championships
Silver medal – second place	2017 Lille	Pole vault

Hendrik Gruber (born 28 September 1986) is a German former pole vaulter. He was the bronze medalist at the 2009 University Games, and finished 2nd at the 2017 European Athletics Team Championships in the pole vault.

== Biography ==
In 2005, Gruber competed in his first major international competition, placing 9th at the European Athletics Junior Championships in the pole vault.

His first major international medal was at the 2009 World University Games pole vault competition, where he won the bronze medal by virtue of being one of only three athletes to clear 5.45 metres.

Gruber competed in the inaugural Diamond League season, placing 4th in the pole vault at the 2010 Shanghai Diamond League.

In September 2018, Gruber retired from the sport.

Gruber competed for the TSV Bayer 04 Leverkusen athletics club. In 2019, he became a coach for the club.

== Statistics ==
=== Personal bests ===
Event	Mark	Competition	Venue	Date
Pole vault (outdoors)	5.70 m	KBC Night of Athletics	Heusden, Belgium	10 July 2010
Pole vault (indoors)	5.75 m	German Indoor Athletics Championships	Dortmund, Germany	24 February 2013
