= 2003 Asian Athletics Championships – Men's pole vault =

The men's pole vault event at the 2003 Asian Athletics Championships was held in Manila, Philippines on September 22.

== Results ==
Rank	Name	Nationality	Result	Notes
1st place, gold medalist(s)	Grigoriy Yegorov	Kazakhstan	5.40	=SB
2nd place, silver medalist(s)	Satoru Yasuda	Japan	5.30	
3rd place, bronze medalist(s)	Kim Se-In	South Korea	5.10	
4	Yang Mu-Huei	Chinese Taipei	5.10	=SB
5	Nunung Jayadi	Indonesia	5.10	SB
6	Pendar Shoughian	Iran	5.00	
7	Sompong Soombankruay	Thailand	5.00	=SB
8	Liu Chun-Wei	Chinese Taipei	4.80	
9	Ali Makki Al-Sabagha	Kuwait	4.60	SB
	Emerson Obiena	Philippines	NM	
