= 2002 Asian Athletics Championships – Men's pole vault =

The men's pole vault event at the 2002 Asian Athletics Championships was held in Colombo, Sri Lanka on 11 August.

== Results ==
Rank	Name	Nationality	Result	Notes
1st place, gold medalist(s)	Daichi Sawano	Japan	5.40	
2nd place, silver medalist(s)	Kim Se-In	South Korea	5.40	PB
3rd place, bronze medalist(s)	Grigoriy Yegorov	Kazakhstan	5.20	
4	Chen Lu-Sheng	Chinese Taipei	5.00	
5	Yang Mu-Huei	Chinese Taipei	5.00	
6	Saeed Abdulla Ghanim	Qatar	4.80	SB
7	Teh Weng Chang	Malaysia	4.80	
8	Ali Youssef Al-Shawareb	Kuwait	4.40	SB
9	A.I.R.P. Perera	Sri Lanka	4.40	PB
10	R.M.C.P. Laksiri	Sri Lanka	4.20	PB
