= Hiroki Ogita =

Japanese pole vaulter (born 1987)

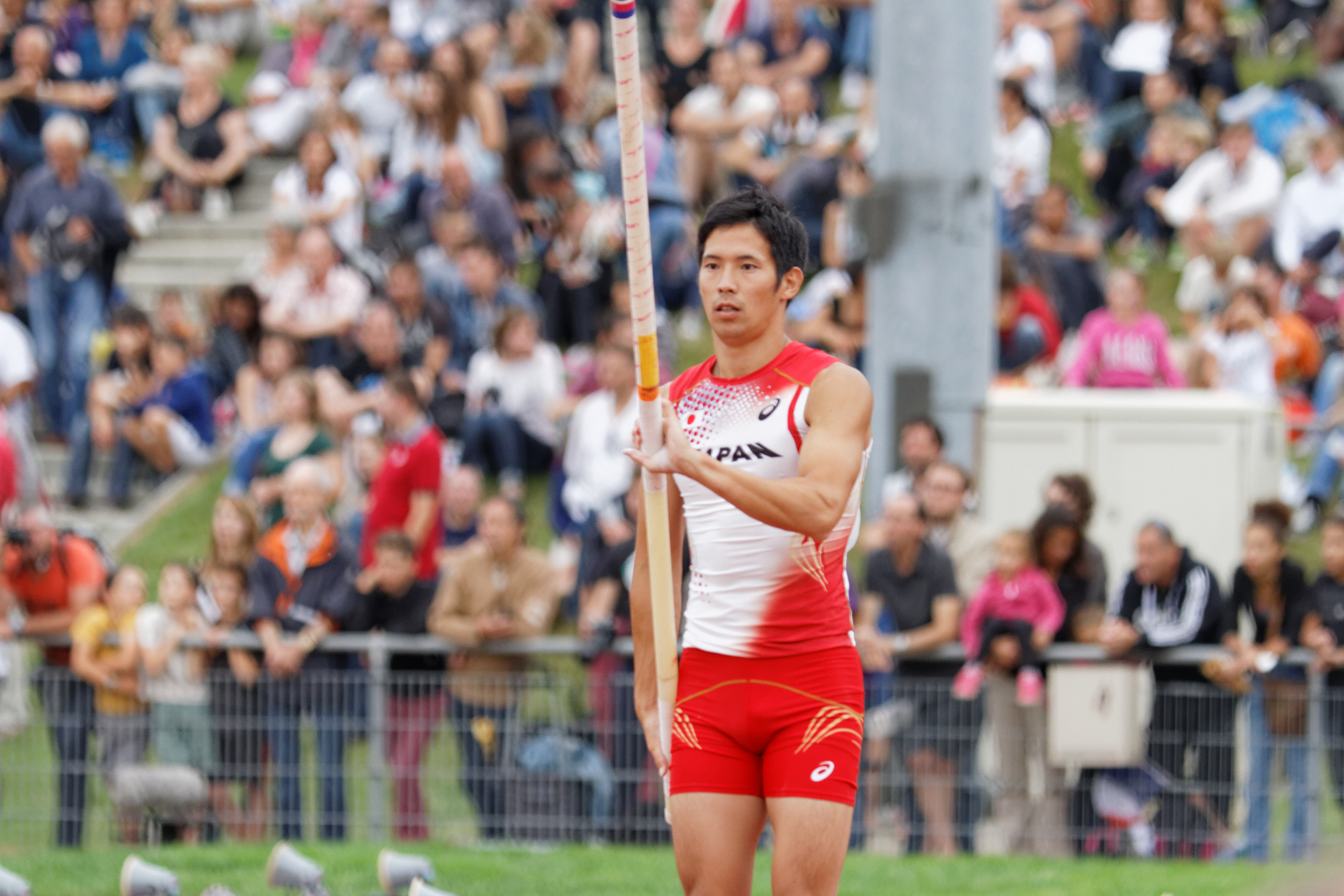
- Hiroki Ogita in 2014

Personal information
- Born: 30 December 1987 (age 38) Kan'onji, Kagawa, Japan
- Education: Kwansei Gakuin University
- Height: 1.86 m (6 ft 1 in)
- Weight: 80 kg (176 lb)

Sport
- Country: Japan
- Sport: Track and field
- Event: Pole vault
- Club: Mizuno Track Club

Achievements and titles
- Personal best: 5.70 (Walnut 2013)
Medal record
Asian Championships
Silver medal – second place	2011 Kobe	Pole vault
Asian Indoor Championships
Bronze medal – third place	2016 Doha	Pole vault
East Asian Games
Gold medal – first place	2009 Hong Kong	Pole vault
Bronze medal – third place	2013 Tianjin	Pole vault

Hiroki Ogita (荻田 大樹, Ogita Hiroki; born 30 December 1987) is a Japanese athlete who specialises in the pole vault. He competed in the pole vault event at the 2015 World Championships in Athletics in Beijing, China. He finished 21st in the pole vault event at the 2016 Summer Olympics in Rio de Janeiro, Brazil.

== International competition ==
Year	Competition	Venue	Position	Event	Height	Notes
Representing Japan
2006	World Junior Championships	Beijing, China	16th (q)	Pole vault	5.10	
2009	Summer Universiade	Belgrade, Serbia	— (q)	Pole vault	NM	
2009	East Asian Games	Hong Kong, China	1st	Pole vault	5.30	
2011	Asian Championships	Kobe, Japan	2nd	Pole vault	5.40	SB
2013	World Championships	Moscow, Russia	21st (q)	Pole vault	5.40	
2013	East Asian Games	Tianjin, China	3rd	Pole vault	5.30	
2014	DécaNation	Angers, France	4th	Pole vault	5.60	
2015	Asian Championships	Wuhan, China	4th	Pole vault	5.50	
2015	World Championships	Beijing, China	20th (q)	Pole vault	5.65	SB
2015	DécaNation	Paris, France	3rd	Pole vault	5.25	
2016	Asian Indoor Championships	Doha, Qatar	3rd	Pole vault	5.50	
2016	Summer Olympics	Rio de Janeiro, Brazil	21st (q)	Pole vault	5.45	
2017	World Championships	London, United Kingdom	18th (q)	Pole vault	5.45	

== National titles ==
- Japanese Championships
  - Pole vault: 2015
