= 2023 Asian Athletics Championships – Women's shot put =

Women's shot put at the 2023 Asian Athletics Championships
- Venue: National Stadium
- Location: Bangkok, Thailand
- Dates: 16 July
- Competitors: 12 from 9 nations
- Winning distance: 18.88 m

Medalists
gold medal	Song Jiayuan	China
silver medal	Abha Khatua	India
bronze medal	Manpreet Kaur	India

The women's shot put event at the 2023 Asian Athletics Championships was held on 16 July.

== Records ==
Records before the 2023 Asian Athletics Championships
Record	Athlete (nation)	Distance (m)	Location	Date
World record	Natalya Lisovskaya (URS)	22.63	Moscow, Soviet Union	7 June 1987
Asian record	Li Meisu (CHN)	21.76	Shijiazhuang, China	23 April 1988
Championship record	Huang Zhihong (CHN)	15.16	New Delhi, India	19 November 1989
World leading	Maggie Ewen (USA)	20.45	Los Angeles, United States	27 May 2023
Asian leading	Gong Lijao (CHN)	20.06	Shenyang, China	28 June 2023

== Results ==
Rank	Name	Nationality	#1	#2	#3	#4	#5	#6	Result	Notes
1st place, gold medalist(s)	Song Jiayuan	China	18.85	18.66	18.73	x	18.88	18.46	18.88	
2nd place, silver medalist(s)	Abha Khatua	India	16.33	17.10	15.46	18.06	16.84	x	18.06	=NR
3rd place, bronze medalist(s)	Manpreet Kaur	India	17.00	x	16.42	16.69	x	x	17.00	
4	Jung You-sun	South Korea	16.40	16.33	16.34	16.04	16.89	16.74	16.89	
5	Chen Chou-hsiu	Chinese Taipei	15.18	15.51	16.49	x	15.72	15.44	16.49	PB
6	Malika Nasreddinova	Uzbekistan	15.93	16.21	16.21	x	x	x	16.21	
7	Nanaka Kori	Japan	16.02	x	14.53	x	15.91	15.21	16.02	
8	Areerat Intadit	Thailand	15.20	x	x	14.31	14.79	x	15.20	
9	Wu Ci-en	Chinese Taipei	x	15.07	x				15.07	
10	Nani Shahirah Maryata	Malaysia	14.92	x	14.83				14.92	
11	Eki Febri Ekawati	Indonesia	14.88	x	x				14.88	
	Ma Yue	China							DNS	
