= Sanya Yadav =

Indian athlete (born 2003)

Sanya Yadav (born 9 August 2003) is an Indian discus thrower. She qualified to represent India in women's discus throw event, at the 2026 Asian Games at Nagoya, Aichi Prefecture, Japan from 19 September to 4 October 2026.

Yadav is from the village of Bairawas of Mahendragarh, Haryana.

== Career ==
Yadav started as a shot putter but from 2021 focussed more on discus throw. In August 2021, she threw the disc to a distance of 42.65 metres at the Indian U20 Championships in Sangrur. In November 2022, she threw 47.31m to win gold at the 37th AFI National Junior Athletics Championships at Guwahati. In September 2024, she came first with a throw of 50.59m at the 4th Indian Open U23 Athletics competition at Patna. In September 2025, she threw 52.05m to win the gold medal at the 64th National Open Athletics Championships at Ranchi. In December 2025, representing Guru Kashi University, she improved the Khelo India University Games record with a throw of 50.73m at Jaipur, erasing the old record of 50.60m set by Shalini Chaudhary of Barkatullah University.

In June 2026, she achieved her personal best with a throw of 56.05m surpassing the Asian Games qualifying mark of 55.48m, and came second, behind Seema, at the 65th Indian Championships at Bubaneswar.
