= 2025 Asian Athletics Championships – Women's shot put =

Women's shot put at the 2025 Asian Athletics Championships
- Venue: Gumi Civic Stadium
- Location: Gumi, South Korea
- Dates: 30 May
- Competitors: 10 from 7 nations
- Winning distance: 18.26 m

Medalists
gold medal	Ma Yue	China
silver medal	Song Jiayuan	China
bronze medal	Chiang Ching-yuan	Chinese Taipei

The women's shot put event at the 2025 Asian Athletics Championships will be held on 30 May.

== Records ==
Records before the 2025 Asian Athletics Championships
Record	Athlete (nation)	Distance (m)	Location	Date
World record	Natalya Lisovskaya (URS)	22.63	Moscow, Soviet Union	7 June 1987
Asian record	Li Meisu (CHN)	21.76	Shijiazhuang, China	23 April 1988
Championship record	Huang Zhihong (CHN)	19.69	New Delhi, India	19 November 1989
World leading	Jessica Schilder (NED)	20.69	Apeldoorn, Netherlands	9 March 2025
Asian leading	Gong Lijao (CHN)	19.62	Xiamen, China	26 April 2025

== Schedule ==
The event schedule, in local time (UTC+9), was as follows:

Date	Time	Round
30 May	17:20	Final

== Results ==
Place	Athlete	Nation	#1	#2	#3	#4	#5	#6	Result	Notes
1st place, gold medalist(s)	Ma Yue	China	18.06	17.88	x	18.26	x	17.95	18.26 m	
2nd place, silver medalist(s)	Song Jiayuan	China	17.25	17.10	17.11	17.78	17.76	x	17.78 m	
3rd place, bronze medalist(s)	Chiang Ching-yuan	Chinese Taipei	15.49	15.01	14.99	15.88	16.59	17.42	17.42 m	PB
4	Malika Nasreddinova	Uzbekistan	16.68	x	x	x	17.01	x	17.01 m	
5	Jeong Yu-sun	South Korea	x	16.12	15.80	16.24	16.27	x	16.27 m	SB
6	Wu Tzu-en	Chinese Taipei	14.38	15.86	15.39	15.96	x	15.64	15.96 m	
7	Lee Su-jung	South Korea	15.16	15.13	15.47	15.50	15.70	15.70	15.70 m	SB
8	Areerat Intadis	Thailand	15.45	14.77	x	14.99	15.10	15.51	15.51 m	
9	Nani Shahirah Maryata	Malaysia	13.95	14.40	15.06				15.06 m	
10	Eki Febri Ekawati	Indonesia	13.81	13.97	13.65				13.97 m	
