= Mohsen Rabbani =

Iranian pole vaulter

Medal record

Representing Iran

Men's athletics

Asian Championships
Gold medal – first place	2007 Amman	Pole vault

Asian Indoor Games
Bronze medal – third place	2005 Bangkok	Pole vault

Asian Indoor Championships
Gold medal – first place	2010 Tehran	Pole vault
Silver medal – second place	2004 Tehran	Pole vault
Bronze medal – third place	2004 Tehran	Pole vault

West Asian Games
Bronze medal – third place	2005 Doha	Pole vault

Islamic Solidarity Games
Silver medal – second place	2013 Palembang	Pole vault

Mohammad Mohsen Rabbani (Persian: محمدمحسن ربانی, born 18 April 1983 in Qom) is an Iranian Pole vaulter.

== Competition record ==
Year	Competition	Venue	Position	Notes
Representing Iran
2002	Asian Junior Championships	Bangkok, Thailand	6th	4.60 m
2004	Asian Indoor Championships	Tehran, Iran	2nd	5.00 m
2005	Islamic Solidarity Games	Mecca, Saudi Arabia	3rd	5.10 m
2005	Asian Championships	Incheon, South Korea	7th	5.00 m
2005	Asian Indoor Games	Bangkok, Thailand	3rd	5.00 m
2005	West Asian Games	Doha, Qatar	3rd	4.80 m
2006	Asian Games	Doha, Qatar	4th	5.30 m
2007	Asian Championships	Amman, Jordan	1st	5.35 m
2007	Universiade	Bangkok, Thailand	8th	5.25 m
2007	Asian Indoor Games	Macau	–	NM
2008	Asian Indoor Championships	Doha, Qatar	4th	4.90 m
2009	Asian Championships	Guangzhou, China	6th	5.15 m
2009	Asian Indoor Games	Hanoi, Vietnam	4th	5.10 m
2010	Asian Indoor Championships	Tehran, Iran	1st	5.20 m
2010	West Asian Championships	Aleppo, Syria	1st	5.00 m
2010	Asian Games	Guangzhou, China	4th	5.20 m
2011	Asian Championships	Kobe, Japan	8th	4.90 m
2011	Universiade	Shenzhen, China	17th (q)	5.00 m
2012	Asian Indoor Championships	Hangzhou, China	4th	5.00 m
2012	West Asian Championships	Dubai, United Arab Emirates	2nd	4.80 m
2013	Asian Championships	Pune, India	–	NM
2013	Islamic Solidarity Games	Palembang, Indonesia	2nd	5.00 m
