= 2005 Asian Athletics Championships – Men's pole vault =

The men's pole vault event at the 2005 Asian Athletics Championships was held in Incheon, South Korea on September 3.

== Results ==
Rank	Name	Nationality	Result	Notes
1st place, gold medalist(s)	Daichi Sawano	Japan	5.40	
2nd place, silver medalist(s)	Zhang Hongwei	China	5.20	
3rd place, bronze medalist(s)	Takehito Ariki	Japan	5.20	
4	Leonid Andreyev	Uzbekistan	5.10	
5	Kim Do-Kyun	South Korea	5.00	
6	Sompong Soombankruay	Thailand	5.00	SB
7	Mohsen Rabbani	Iran	5.00	
8	Fahad Bader Al-Mershad	Kuwait	4.80	
8	Teh Weng Chang	Malaysia	4.80	
10	Amnat Kunpadit	Thailand	4.80	
11	Gajanan Upadhyay	India	4.80	
	Liu Feiliang	China	NM	
	Artem Pilipenko	Kazakhstan	NM	
	Kim Se-In	South Korea	NM	
	Ali Makki Al-Sabagha	Kuwait	NM	
