= Satoru Yasuda =

Japanese pole vaulter (born 1975)

Medal record

Men's athletics

Representing Japan

Asian Championships
| Silver medal – second place | 2000 Jakarta | Pole vault |
| Silver medal – second place | 2003 Manila | Pole vault |

Satoru Yasuda (born 27 July 1975) is a Japanese pole vaulter.

His personal best jump is 5.50 metres, achieved in May 2000 in Gifu.

== International competitions ==
Representing Japan
| Year | Competition | Venue | Position | Notes |
|---|---|---|---|---|
| 1994 | World Junior Championships | Lisbon, Portugal | 21st (q) | 4.80 m |
| 2000 | Asian Championships | Jakarta, Indonesia | 2nd | 5.20 m |
| 2001 | East Asian Games | Osaka, Japan | 3rd | 5.20 m |
| 2002 | Asian Games | Busan, South Korea | 2nd | 5.40 m |
| 2003 | Asian Championships | Manila, Philippines | 2nd | 5.30 m |
