= Mitsuhiro Abiko =

Japanese sprinter (born 1988)

Personal information
- Nationality: Japan
- Born: 25 October 1988 (age 38) Yamagata Prefecture, Japan
- Height: 1.71 m (5 ft 7 1/2 in)
- Weight: 66 kg (146 lb)

Sport
- Sport: Athletics
- Event: Sprints
- University team: University of Tsukuba

Achievements and titles
- Personal bests: 100 m: 10.30 s (2009); 200 m: 20.48 s (2009); 300 m: 32.63 s (2009); 400 m: 46.23 s (2008)
Medal record
Men's athletics
Representing Japan
Asian Junior Championships
Gold medal – first place	2006 Macau	4×400 m relay
Bronze medal – third place	2006 Macau	400 m

Mitsuhiro Abiko (安孫子 充裕, Abiko Mitsuhiro; born October 25, 1988 in Yamagata Prefecture) is a Japanese sprinter, who specialized in the 400 metres. Abiko competed in the men's 4 × 400 m relay at the 2008 Summer Olympics in Beijing, along with his teammates Kenji Narisako, Dai Tamesue, and Yoshihiro Horigome. He ran on the starting leg of the second heat, with an individual-split time of 46.70 seconds. Abiko and his team finished the relay in sixth place for a seasonal best time of 3:04.18, failing to advance into the final.

== Personal bests ==
Event	Time	Wind	Venue	Date
100 m	10.30 s	+0.4 m/s	Tokyo, Japan	17 May 2009
200 m	20.48 s	-0.4 m/s	Osaka, Japan	9 May 2009
300 m	32.63 s		Izumo, Japan	19 April 2009
400 m	46.23 s		Kawasaki, Japan	29 June 2008

== Records ==
- Medley relay (100m×200m×300m×400m)
  - Current Japanese university record holder - 1:50.12 s (relay leg: 2nd) (Odawara, 16 October 2010)^{[a]}

^{a} with Sōta Kawatsura, Akihiro Urano, and Hideyuki Hirose

== Competition record ==
Year	Competition	Venue	Position	Event	Notes
Representing Japan
2006	Asian Junior Championships	Macau, China	3rd	400 m	47.83
2006	Asian Junior Championships	Macau, China	4th	4 × 100 m relay	40.80 (relay leg: 3rd)
2006	Asian Junior Championships	Macau, China	1st	4 × 400 m relay	3:10.09 (relay leg: 1st)
2006	World Junior Championships	Beijing, China	34th (h)	200 m	21.79 (wind: 0.0 m/s)
2006	World Junior Championships	Beijing, China	8th	4 × 400 m relay	3:16.61 (relay leg: 1st)
2008	Olympics	Beijing, China	14th (h)	4 × 400 m relay	3:04.18 (relay leg: 1st)
2009	Universiade	Belgrade, Serbia	10h (sf)	200 m	21.06 (wind: -0.2 m/s)
2009	Universiade	Belgrade, Serbia	– (h)	4 × 100 m relay	DQ (relay leg: 3rd)
2010	Asian Games	Guangzhou, China	10th (h)	200 m	21.28 (wind: +0.6 m/s)
2010	Asian Games	Guangzhou, China	10th (h)	4 × 100 m relay	47.14 (relay leg: 3rd)
