= Takafumi Suzuki (athlete) =

Japanese pole vaulter (born 1987)

Personal information
- Nationality: Japanese
- Born: 25 May 1987 (age 39) Fuji, Shizuoka, Japan
- Education: Tokai University
- Height: 1.82 m (6 ft 0 in)
- Weight: 73 kg (161 lb)

Sport
- Country: Japan
- Sport: Track and field
- Event: Pole vault

Achievements and titles
- Personal best: 5.55 m (2008, 2009)
Medal record
Men's athletics
Representing Japan
Asian Championships
| Bronze medal – third place | 2007 Amman | Pole vault |
Asian Indoor Championships
| Silver medal – second place | 2008 Doha | Pole vault |
Asian Junior Championships
| Silver medal – second place | 2006 Macau | Pole vault |

Takafumi Suzuki (鈴木 崇文, Suzuki Takafumi; born 25 May 1987 in Fuji, Shizuoka) is a Japanese pole vaulter. He competed at the 2009 World Championships without reaching the final. He is the 2010 Japanese Championships champion. His personal best jump is 5.55 metres, achieved in April 2008 and May 2009. The former was the Japanese university record at the time.

== Personal bests ==
| Event | Height | Competition | Venue | Date | Notes |
|---|---|---|---|---|---|
| Outdoor | 5.55 m | Eastern Shizuoka Championships | Numazu, Japan | 19 April 2008 | Former NUR |
| Outdoor | 5.55 m | Shizuoka International Meet | Fukuroi, Japan | 3 May 2009 | |

== International competition ==
| Year | Competition | Venue | Position | Event | Height |
Representing Japan
| 2006 | Asian Junior Championships | Macau, China | 2nd | Pole vault | 5.20 m |
| 2006 | World Junior Championships | Beijing, China | 24th (qf) | Pole vault | 5.00 m |
| 2007 | Asian Championships | Amman, Jordan | 3rd | Pole vault | 5.10 m |
| 2008 | Asian Indoor Championships | Doha, Qatar | 2nd | Pole vault | 5.35 |
| 2009 | Universiade | Belgrade, Serbia | 8th | Pole vault | 5.25 m |
| 2009 | World Championships | Berlin, Germany | 30th (qf) | Pole vault | 5.25 m |
| 2009 | Asian Championships | Guangzhou, China | 5th | Pole vault | 5.15 m |
| 2010 | Asian Games | Guangzhou, China | 5th | Pole vault | 5.20 m |
| 2011 | Asian Championships | Kobe, Japan | 5th | Pole vault | 5.20 m |

== National title ==
- Japanese Championships
  - Pole vault: 2010
