= 2000 Asian Athletics Championships – Men's pole vault =

The men's pole vault event at the 2000 Asian Athletics Championships was held in Jakarta, Indonesia on 30 August.

== Results ==
Rank	Name	Nationality	4.80	5.00	5.10	5.20	5.30	5.40	5.60	Result	Notes
1st place, gold medalist(s)	Zhang Hongwei	China	–	xo	–	xo	–	xo	x–	5.40	
2nd place, silver medalist(s)	Satoru Yasuda	Japan	–	o	–	o	xxx			5.20	
3rd place, bronze medalist(s)	Liu Yen-Sung	Chinese Taipei	xo	xxo	o	xxx				5.10	
4	Kim Se-In	South Korea								5.00	
5	Chen Lu-Sheng	Chinese Taipei								5.00	
	Nunung Jayadi	Indonesia	xxx							NM	
