= 2019 Asian Athletics Championships – Women's shot put =

Women's shot put at the 2019 Asian Athletics Championships
- Venue: Khalifa International Stadium
- Location: Doha, Qatar
- Dates: 21 April
- Competitors: 7 from 5 nations
- Winning distance: 19.18 m

Medalists
gold medal	Gong Lijiao	China
silver medal	Noora Salem Jasim	Bahrain
bronze medal	Song Jiayuan	China

The women's shot put at the 2019 Asian Athletics Championships was held on 21 April.

== Records ==
Records before the 2019 Asian Athletics Championships
Record	Athlete (nation)	Distance (m)	Location	Date
World record	Natalya Lisovskaya (URS)	22.63	Moscow, Soviet Union	7 June 1987
Asian record	Li Meisu (CHN)	21.76	Shijiazhuang, China	23 April 1988
Championship record	Huang Zhihong (CHN)	15.16	New Delhi, India	19 November 1989
World leading	Chase Ealy (USA)	19.67	Tempe, United States	6 April 2019
Asian leading	Gong Lijao (CHN)	19.14	Hangzhou, China	20 March 2019

== Results ==
Rank	Name	Nationality	#1	#2	#3	#4	#5	#6	Result	Notes
1st place, gold medalist(s)	Gong Lijiao	China	18.52	19.18	19.13	x	18.90	19.00	19.18	SB
2nd place, silver medalist(s)	Noora Salem Jasim	Bahrain	17.90	18.00	17.64	17.73	17.49	x	18.00	NR
3rd place, bronze medalist(s)	Song Jiayuan	China	17.61	17.56	17.00	17.58	17.70	17.21	17.70	
4	Nanaka Kori	Japan	15.48	15.68	x	x	x	x	15.68	
5	Aya Ota	Japan	15.50	15.26	15.45	x	x	x	15.50	
6	Lin Chia-ying	Chinese Taipei	x	14.97	14.78	15.24	15.32	x	15.32	
7	Eki Febri Ekawati	Indonesia	13.91	13.46	14.94	14.85	14.84	x	14.94	SB
