= Daichi Sawano =

Japanese pole vaulter (born 1980)

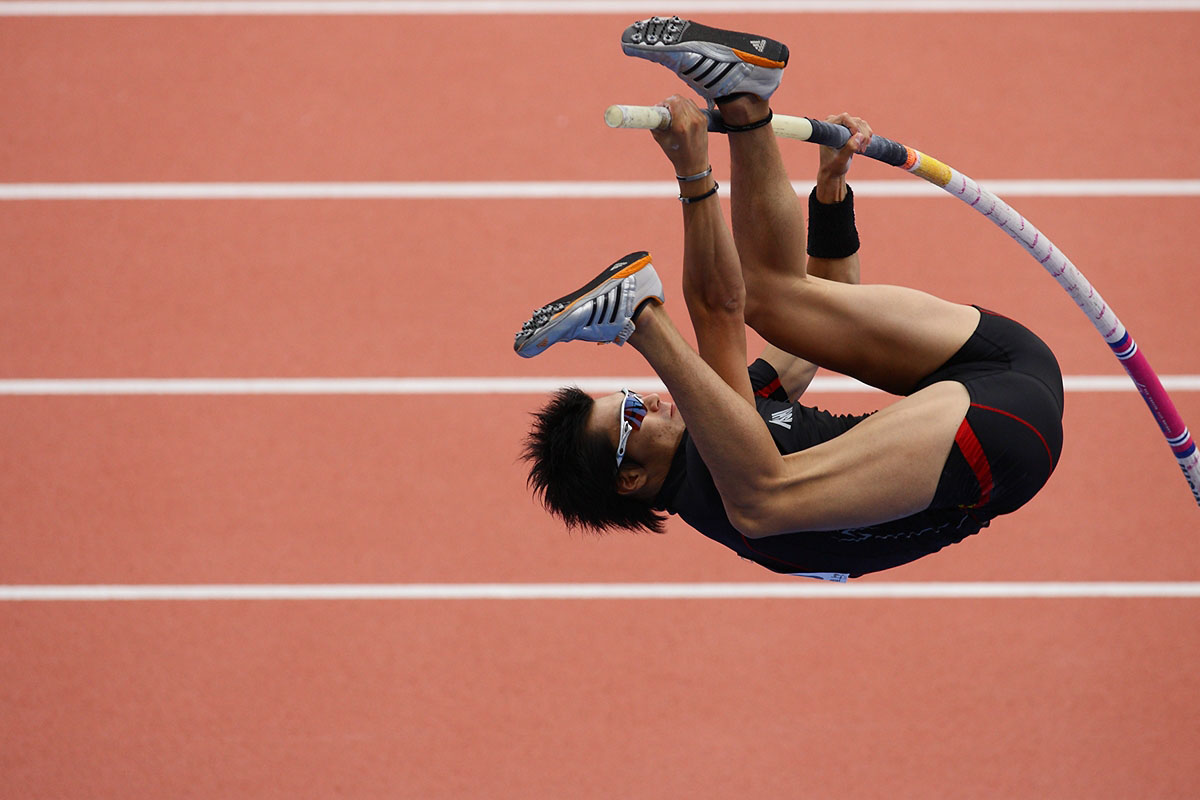
- At the 92nd Japan Athletics Championships in June 2008

Personal information
- Born: 16 September 1980 (age 45) Osaka
- Height: 1.83 m (6 ft 0 in)
- Weight: 74 kg (163 lb)

Sport
- Country: Japan
- Sport: Athletics
- Event: Pole vault
Medal record
Men's athletics
Representing Japan
Asian Championships
| Gold medal – first place | 2002 Colombo | Pole vault |
| Gold medal – first place | 2005 Incheon | Pole vault |
Asian Indoor Championships
| Gold medal – first place | 2006 Pattaya | Pole vault |
| Gold medal – first place | 2008 Doha | Pole vault |

Daichi Sawano (澤野大地, Sawano Daichi; born 16 September 1980 in Nishiyodogawa-ku, Osaka and raised in Chiba Prefecture) is a Japanese pole vaulter.

His personal best is 5.83 metres, which is the current Japanese National Record (as of 2019/01/01) achieved in May 2005 in Shizuoka. Sawano is a three-time Olympian (2004, 2008, 2016), two-time Olympic Finalist, whose best finish was 7th at the Rio Olympics (2016).

Sawano is currently coached by the staff at the University of Japan (Nichidai) and USA Track and Field National Pole Vault Chair, Brian Yokoyama. He was formerly coached by former Japanese record holder Teruyasu Yonekura and renown Japanese pole coach Yamazaki.

== Competition record ==
| Year | Competition | Venue | Position | Notes |
Representing Japan
| 2002 | Asian Championships | Colombo, Sri Lanka | 1st | 5.40 m |
| 2003 | World Championships | Paris, France | 10th (q) | 5.60 m |
| 2004 | World Indoor Championships | Budapest, Hungary | 14th (q) | 5.55 m |
| 2004 | Olympic Games | Athens, Greece | 13th | 5.55 m |
| 2005 | World Championships | Helsinki, Finland | 8th | 5.50 m |
| 2005 | Asian Championships | Incheon, South Korea | 1st | 5.40 m |
| 2006 | Asian Indoor Championships | Pattaya, Thailand | 1st | 5.60 m |
| 2006 | World Indoor Championships | Moscow, Russia | 9th (q) | 5.65 m |
| 2006 | World Athletics Final | Stuttgart, Germany | 6th | 5.65 m |
| 2006 | World Cup | Athens, Greece | 2nd | 5.70 m |
| 2006 | Asian Games | Doha, Qatar | 1st | 5.60 m |
| 2007 | World Championships | Osaka, Japan | – (q) | NM |
| 2008 | Asian Indoor Championships | Doha, Qatar | 1st | 5.45 m |
| 2008 | World Indoor Championships | Valencia, Spain | 10th (q) | 5.65 m |
| 2008 | Olympic Games | Beijing, China | 16th (q) | 5.55 m |
| 2009 | World Championships | Berlin, Germany | 10th | 5.50 m |
| 2009 | Asian Championships | Guangzhou, China | 3rd | 5.45 m |
| 2011 | Asian Championships | Kobe, Japan | 1st | 5.50 m |
| 2011 | World Championships | Daegu, South Korea | 14th | 5.65 m |
| 2013 | World Championships | Moscow, Russia | 14th (q) | 5.40 m |
| 2014 | Asian Games | Incheon, South Korea | 2nd | 5.55 m |
| 2016 | Olympic Games | Rio de Janeiro, Brazil | 7th | 5.50 m |
| 2019 | World Championships | Doha, Qatar | 27th (q) | 5.45 m |
