= Guo Tianqian =

Chinese shot putter (born 1995)

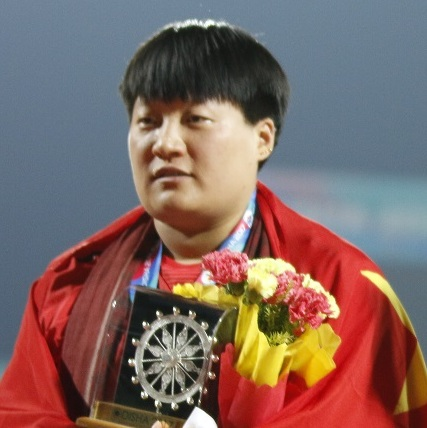
- China's Guo Tianqian winning Silver in 2017

Medal record

Women's athletics

Representing China

Asian Indoor Championships
Silver medal – second place	2016 Doha	Shot put

Guo Tianqian (born 1 June 1995 in Shijiazhuang) is a Chinese athlete specialising in the shot put. She is the 2011 youth and 2014 junior champion in the event. She won her first major senior medal, a bronze, at the 2014 Asian Games.

Her personal best is 18.08 metres outdoors (Jinan 2014) and 16.96 metres indoors (Nanjing 2013).

== Competition record ==
Year	Competition	Venue	Position	Event	Notes
Representing China
2011	World Youth Championships	Lille, France	1st	Shot put	15.24 m
2014	World Junior Championships	Eugene, United States	1st	Shot put	17.71 m
2014	Asian Games	Incheon, South Korea	3rd	Shot put	17.52 m
2015	Asian Championships	Wuhan, China	1st	Shot put	18.59 m
2015	World Championships	Beijing, China	16th (q)	Shot put	17.10 m
2016	Asian Indoor Championships	Doha, Qatar	2nd	Shot put	17.44 m
2017	Asian Championships	Bhubaneswar, India	2nd	Shot put	17.91 m
