= Zhang Linru =

Chinese shot putter (born 1999)

Personal information
- Born: 23 September 1999 (age 26)

Sport
- Sport: Athletics
- Event: Shot put
Medal record
Women's athletics
Representing China
Asian Beach Games
Silver medal – second place	2026 Sanya	Beach shot put

Zhang Linru (Chinese: 张林如; born 23 September 1999) is a Chinese athlete specialising in the shot put. She represented her country at the 2019 World Championships in Doha without reaching the final. In 2018, she won a silver medal at the World U20 Championships in Tampere.

Her personal bests in the event are 18.05 metres outdoors (Shenyang 2019) and 16.71 metres indoors (Xi'an 2019).

== International competitions ==
Year	Competition	Venue	Position	Event	Notes
Representing China
2018	Asian Junior Championships	Gifu, Japan	1st	Shot put	16.05 m
2018	World U20 Championships	Tampere, Finland	2nd	Shot put	17.05 m
2019	World Championships	Doha, Qatar	17th (q)	Shot put	17.65 m
2022	World Championships	Eugene, United States	19th (q)	Shot put	17.54 m
2023	World Championships	Budapest, Hungary	17th (q)	Shot put	18.08 m
2025	World Championships	Tokyo, Japan	7th	Shot put	19.16 m
