= Zhang Hongwei (pole vaulter) =

Chinese pole vaulter

Medal record

Men's athletics

Representing China

Asian Championships
Gold medal – first place	2000 Jakarta	Pole vault
Silver medal – second place	2005 Incheon	Pole vault

Asian Indoor Championships
Gold medal – first place	2004 Tehran	Pole vault

Zhang Hongwei (simplified Chinese: 张宏伟; traditional Chinese: 張宏偉; pinyin: Zhāng Hóngwěi) (born April 26, 1975) is a Chinese pole vaulter. His personal best jump is 5.63 metres, achieved in May 2000 in Deyang.

He won the gold medal at the 2000 Asian Championships and the silver medal at the 2005 Asian Championships.

== Achievements ==
Year	Competition	Venue	Position	Notes
Representing China
2000	Asian Championships	Jakarta, Indonesia	1st	5.40 m
2004	Asian Indoor Championships	Tehran, Iran	1st	5.40 m
2005	Asian Championships	Incheon, South Korea	2nd	5.20 m
