= Noora Salem Jasim =

Bahraini athlete

Personal information
- Born: 27 November 1996 (age 29) Nigeria

Sport
- Sport: Athletics
- Events: Shot put, discus throw
Medal record
Women's athletics
Representing Bahrain
Asian Indoor Championships
Bronze medal – third place	2016 Doha	Shot put

Noora Salem Jasim (born 27 November 1996) is a Nigerian-born Bahraini athlete competing primarily in the shot put. She represented Bahrain at the 2017 World Championships without qualifying for the final.

== International competitions ==
Year	Competition	Venue	Position	Event	Notes
Representing Bahrain
2013	Arab Championships	Doha, Qatar	2nd	Shot put	13.80 m
2013	Arab Championships	Doha, Qatar	5th	Discus throw	32.54 m
2013	Arab Youth Championships	Cairo, Egypt	1st	Shot put (3 kg)	15.24 m
2013	Arab Youth Championships	Cairo, Egypt	2nd	Discus throw	39.52 m
2013	World Youth Championships	Donetsk, Ukraine	9th	Shot put (3 kg)	16.48 m
2014	Arab Junior Championships	Cairo, Egypt	2nd	Shot put	13.94 m
2014	Arab Junior Championships	Cairo, Egypt	2nd	Discus throw	43.70 m
2014	World Junior Championships	Eugene, United States	19th (q)	Shot put	14.28 m
2014	Asian Games	Incheon, South Korea	8th	Shot put	15.16 m
2014	Asian Games	Incheon, South Korea	9th	Discus throw	43.98 m
2015	Arab Championships	Isa Town, Bahrain	1st	Shot put	14.97 m
2015	Arab Championships	Isa Town, Bahrain	3rd	Discus throw	47.05 m
2015	Military World Games	Mungyeong, South Korea	8th	Shot put	15.24 m
2015	Military World Games	Mungyeong, South Korea	6th	Discus throw	49.87 m
2016	Asian Indoor Championships	Doha, Qatar	3rd	Shot put	16.26 m
2017	Islamic Solidarity Games	Baku, Azerbaijan	3rd	Shot put	17.02 m
2017	Islamic Solidarity Games	Baku, Azerbaijan	2nd	Discus throw	50.12 m
2017	World Championships	London, United Kingdom	22nd (q)	Shot put	16.97 m
2018	Asian Games	Jakarta, Indonesia	3rd	Shot put	17.11 m
2018	Asian Games	Jakarta, Indonesia	6th	Discus throw	51.19 m
2019	Arab Championships	Cairo, Egypt	1st	Shot put	17.93 m
2019	Arab Championships	Cairo, Egypt	1st	Discus throw	46.23
2019	Asian Championships	Doha, Qatar	2nd	Shot put	18.00 m
2019	Asian Championships	Doha, Qatar	8th	Discus throw	46.08 m
2019	World Championships	Doha, Qatar	22nd (q)	Shot put	17.36 m
2023	Arab Games	Oran, Algeria	1st	Shot put	15.89 m
2023	Arab Games	Oran, Algeria	4th	Discus throw	40.98 m
2023	Asian Games	Hangzhou, China	9th	Shot put	15.13 m
2025	Islamic Solidarity Games	Riyadh, Saudi Arabia	3rd	Shot put	15.44 m
2025	Islamic Solidarity Games	Riyadh, Saudi Arabia	7th	Discus throw	42.91 m

== Personal bests ==
Jasim's personal bests include:

=== Outdoor ===
- Shot put – 18.00 (Doha 2019) NR
- Discus throw – 50.12 (Baku 2017) NR

=== Indoor ===
- Shot put – 17.45 (Dobrich 2017) NR
