= Song Jiayuan =

Chinese shot putter (born 1997)

Personal information
- Born: 15 September 1997 (age 28) Shanghai, China
- Education: Shanghai University
- Height: 185 cm (6 ft 1 in)

Sport
- Sport: Athletics
- Event: Shot put
Medal record
Women's athletics
Representing China
Olympic Games
Bronze medal – third place	2024 Paris	Shot put
Asian Beach Games
Gold medal – first place	2026 Sanya	Beach shot put
Asian Championships
Gold medal – first place	2023 Bangkok	Shot put
Silver medal – second place	2025 Gumi	Shot put
Bronze medal – third place	2019 Doha	Shot put
Asian Indoor Championships
Gold medal – first place	2026 Tianjin	Shot put
World University Games
Gold medal – first place	2021 Chengdu	Shot put

Song Jiayuan (Chinese: 宋佳媛; born 15 September 1997) is a Chinese athlete specialising in the shot put who won bronze at the 2024 Paris Olympics. She represented her country at the 2019 World Championships in Doha without reaching the final. In 2016, she won a silver medal at the World U20 Championships in Bydgoszcz.

Her personal bests in the event are 18.32 metres outdoors (Chengdu 2019) and 18.23 metres indoors (Hangzhou 2019).

== International competitions ==
Year	Competition	Venue	Position	Event	Notes
Representing China
2016	World U20 Championships	Bydgoszcz, Poland	2nd	Shot put	16.36 m
2019	Asian Championships	Doha, Qatar	3rd	Shot put	17.70 m
2019	Universiade	Naples, Italy	8th	Shot put	16.92 m
2019	World Championships	Doha, Qatar	23rd (q)	Shot put	17.24 m
2021	Olympic Games	Tokyo, Japan	5th	Shot put	19.14 m
2022	World Championships	Eugene, United States	6th	Shot put	19.57 m
2023	Asian Championships	Bangkok, Thailand	1st	Shot put	18.88 m
2023	World University Games	Chengdu, China	1st	Shot put	18.56 m
2023	World Championships	Budapest, Hungary	11th	Shot put	18.90 m
2023	Asian Games	Hangzhou, China	2nd	Shot put	18.92 m
2024	Olympic Games	Paris, France	3rd	Shot put	19.32 m
2025	Asian Championships	Gumi, South Korea	2nd	Shot put	17.78 m
2026	Asian Indoor Championships	Tianjin, China	1st	Shot put	18.36 m
