= Reza Moghadam =

British-Iranian economist

Reza Moghadam is a British-Iranian economist who has been Vice-Chairman for Global Capital Markets at Morgan Stanley since October 2014. Until July 2014, he was the International Monetary Fund's front man for dealing with European policy makers and institutions during the eurozone crisis. During his twenty-year career at the IMF he dealt first-hand with many crises—in emerging markets, in the advanced countries of the Eurozone and with the Fund's own restructuring.

== Personal life and education ==
The eldest of three children, Reza Moghadam was born in Borojerd in Western Iran on 4 May 1962 and raised in Tehran. His family moved to London when the Islamic revolution broke out in 1979. In 1982 he was admitted to Oxford University where he studied mathematics at Magdalen College. While there, he was elected president of the student union (Junior Common Room) and created and ran the first Magdalen College Arts Festival. Following a master's degree at the London School of Economics and Political Science, he went on to the University of Warwick for his PhD in Economics; his doctoral thesis was on wage determination. He is a passionate cyclist and a supporter of the Chelsea Football Club.

== Early career ==
While studying for his PhD, Moghadam taught economics at the Universities of Warwick as well as in London and Bristol. During this time he worked with Colin Carter on the renovation of the LSE's Phillips Machine, a 60-year-old hydraulic model of the British economy used to demonstrate visually the workings of open economy macroeconomic theory. The machine is now on permanent display at the London Science Museum. From 1990 to 1992, he worked as an Economist for Coopers and Lybrand, focusing on labor market, regulatory and privatization issues.

== International Monetary Fund career ==
Moghadam joined the IMF in 1992 in its elite Economist Program. Moghadam started in the European Department, where he got to deal with the fall-out from the collapse of the communist states, German reunification, and the implosion of the exchange-rate mechanism. He then transferred to the Asia and Pacific Department in 1997 just as Thailand devalued its currency, the first domino of the Asian Crisis. As the IMF resident representative in Bangkok, he was the IMF's man on the ground helping ensure the flow of international assistance to Thailand and advising the government. Returning to IMF headquarters in Washington in 2000, Moghadam headed the missions to Thailand and Indonesia before turning to new crises in Argentina, Brazil and Turkey – in his capacity as adviser to Anne Krueger, then the IMF's First Deputy Managing Director. In 2003, Moghadam became Turkey mission chief at a time when its program was off track, inflation out of control and a newly- elected government was trying to find its feet in the build-up to war in Iraq. Moghadam's re-making of the programme laid the foundation for the country's subsequent economic success. Recalling those years, Kemal Dervis, the then finance minister of Turkey, recently referred to Reza Moghadam as "one of the top economists in the world" and a "sometimes tough negotiator".

In 2005, Moghadam was picked by Managing Director Rodrigo de Rato as chief of staff. When de Rato quit in 2007, incoming boss Dominique Strauss-Kahn, asked Moghadam to stay on. In September 2008, just as the Lehman crisis was gathering steam, Moghadam was appointed head of the pivotal Policy Development and Review Department (PDR), which was turned by Strauss Kahn into the Strategy, Policy and Review (SPR) department tasked with spearheading the modernization of the institution. "Dominique Strauss-Kahn is publicly portrayed as the man who transformed the Fund. But inside the Fund they say that it was Reza Moghadam, who experienced the street rioting during the Asian crisis, who truly transformed the organization." "Moghadam's job is to make sure that everything remains structured and yet constantly in flux to suit the crisis of the day. Moghadam is a sort of secretary general for the Fund. He introduces internal and external reforms and proposes new groups and strategies."

In November 2011, with the euro-area crisis deepening, Christine Lagarde who had taken over the helm of the IMF in July, asked Moghadam to become the Director of the European Department. The change garnered praise from many analysts who saw it as a move to heighten the IMF's profile in dealing with the worsening crisis in Europe. "He [Moghadam] is seen as a very credible and powerful insider," Eswar Prasad, a former IMF official and a senior fellow at Brookings Institution in Washington, told the Reuters news agency. "It shows that the IMF intends to be much more assertive in playing a prominent role in Europe and Reza Moghadam is somebody who is seen as being able to move the Fund to that more aggressive position." From then on, he was the key architect of the Fund's strategy in dealing with crises in Greece, Ireland, Portugal, Cyprus and later Ukraine; he was also at the forefront of the policy dialogue with Italy and the Euro-area. Commenting on his tenure, Benoit Coeuré, the European Central Bank executive board member responsible for Brussels policy said "He did not tell us Europeans what we wanted to hear but what we needed to hear, which is exactly fund's role." "Reza's departure is indeed a pity, as he always steered a totally straight course. And he does not blink," added Thomas Wieser, the head of the EU's powerful euro working group, who occasionally tangled with Moghadam.

== Communication and engagement ==
=== Videos ===
- "Deflation" versus "Lowflation" in the Euro Area, 4 March 2014: http://www.imf.org/external/mmedia/view.aspx?vid=3291843394001
- Europe on the Mend? 25 September 2013: http://www.imf.org/external/mmedia/view.aspx?vid=2693791836001
- More traditional video-interviews are also available here: http://www.imf.org/external/mmedia/view.aspx?st=Keyword&variable=moghadam

=== Selected blogs ===
- Euro Area- Q&A on QE
- Euro Area — "deflation" versus "lowflation"
- How Real Is The Recovery In The Euro Area How Real Is The Recovery In The Euro Area?

Other blogs are available here http://blog-imfdirect.imf.org/bloggers/reza-moghadam/

=== Speeches and articles ===
- Sustaining the Recovery: Strategies and Policies for Growth and Stability, 2014 http://www.imf.org/external/np/speeches/2014/061014.htm
- Maastricht and the Crisis in Europe: Where We’ve Been and What We’ve Learned, 2013: http://www.imf.org/external/np/speeches/2014/021214.htm
- Europe’s road to integration, Finance and Development, March 2014: http://www.imf.org/external/pubs/ft/fandd/2014/03/moghadam.htm

=== Academic work ===
- Relative Wage Flexibility in Four Countries, 1989, with Christopher A. Pissarides (winner of the 2010 Nobel Prize in Economics)
- Are wages forward-looking? 1989, with Simon Wren-Lewis
- Wage Determination : An International Perspective, 1990
- Turkey at the Crossroads: From Crisis Resolution to EU Accession Occasional Paper No. 242; 2005
- Hungary: Economic Policies for Sustainable Growth IMF Occasional Paper No. 159; 1998
- Unemployment Hysteresis, Wage Determination, and Labor Market Flexibility: The Case of Belgium With van Rijckeghem, Caroline IMF Working Paper No. 94/150, 1994
- Why is Unemployment in France So High? IMF Working Paper No. 94/58, 1994
- Labor Market Issues in Belgium: An International Perspective; IMF Working Paper No. 93/32, 1993
- Capital and Trade as Engines of Growth in France - An Application of Johansen's Cointegration Methodology (with Coe, David T.); IMF Working Paper No. 93/11, 1993
