= Leonid Andreev (athlete) =

Uzbekistani pole vaulter and decathlete

Personal information
- Born: 6 October 1983 (age 42)
- Height: 1.98 m (6 ft 6 in)
- Weight: 93 kg (205 lb)

Sport
- Country: Uzbekistan
- Sport: Athletics
- Events: Decathlon, pole vault
Medal record
Men's athletics
Representing Uzbekistan
Asian Indoor Championships
Bronze medal – third place	2008 Doha	Pole vault
Bronze medal – third place	2014 Hangzhou	Heptathlon

Leonid Vladimirovich Andreev (Cyrillic: Леонид Владимирович Андреев; born 6 October 1983) is an Uzbekistani pole vaulter and decathlete.

He first competed in the decathlon, placing fourteenth at the 2000 World Junior Championships and winning the gold medal at the 2002 World Junior Championships.

He then concentrated on the pole vault. He was qualified for the 2004 Olympic Games, but did not start in the event. He then no-heighted at the 2005 and 2007 World Championships. At the 2006 Asian Games he won the silver medal.

Starting with 2013, he again focused on the combined events representing his country at the 2016 Summer Olympics where he did not finish the competition.

His personal best in the pole vault is 5.65 metres, achieved in May 2008 in Tashkent.

== Competition record ==
Year	Competition	Venue	Position	Event	Notes
Representing Uzbekistan
2000	World Junior Championships	Santiago, Chile	14th	Decathlon	6654 pts
2001	Asian Junior Championships	Bandar Seri Begawan, Brunei	2nd	Decathlon	6897 pts
2002	World Junior Championships	Kingston, Jamaica	1st	Decathlon (junior)	7693 pts
2002	Asian Junior Championships	Bangkok, Thailand	1st	Pole vault	5.20 m
2005	World Championships	Helsinki, Finland	–	Pole vault	NM
2005	Asian Championships	Incheon, South Korea	4th	Pole vault	5.10 m
2006	Asian Games	Doha, Qatar	2nd	Pole vault	5.55 m
2007	World Championships	Osaka, Japan	–	Pole vault	NM
2008	Asian Indoor Championships	Doha, Qatar	3rd	Pole vault	5.35 m
2008	World Indoor Championships	Valencia, Spain	14th (q)	Pole vault	5.45 m
2008	Olympic Games	Beijing, China	3rd (q)	Pole vault	5.65 m
2009	World Championships	Berlin, Germany	19th (q)	Pole vault	5.55 m
2009	Asian Indoor Games	Hanoi, Vietnam	1st	Pole vault	5.60 m
2009	Asian Championships	Guangzhou, China	4th	Pole vault	5.45 m
2010	Asian Games	Guangzhou, China	2nd	Pole vault	5.30 m
2011	Asian Championships	Kobe, Japan	–	Pole vault	NM
2013	Asian Championships	Pune, India	3rd	Decathlon	7383 pts
2014	Asian Indoor Championships	Hangzhou, China	3rd	Heptathlon	5561 pts
2014	Asian Games	Incheon, South Korea	2nd	Decathlon	7879 pts
2016	Asian Indoor Championships	Doha, Qatar	4th	Heptathlon	5607 pts
2016	Olympic Games	Rio de Janeiro, Brazil	–	Decathlon	DNF

== Personal bests ==
Outdoor

- 100 metres – 10.97 (+1.8 m/s, Kingston 2002)
- 400 metres – 49.59 (Incheon 2014)
- 1500 metres – 4:58.37 (Kingston 2002)
- 110 metres hurdles – 14.57 (Tashkent 2016)
- High jump – 2.10 (Kingston 2002)
- Pole vault – 5.70 (Tashkent 2009)
- Long jump – 7.30 (Tashkent 2016)
- Shot put – 16.27 (Tashkent 2016)
- Discus throw – 46.20 (Tashkent 2016)
- Javelin throw – 61.02 (Tashkent 2016)
- Decathlon – 8250 (Tashkent 2016)

Indoor

- 60 metres – 7.20 (Doha 2016)
- 1000 metres – 2:53.84 (Doha 2016)
- 60 metres hurdles – 8.39 (Doha 2016)
- High jump – 1.99 (Hangzhou 2014)
- Pole vault – 5.60 (Chemnitz 2009)
- Long jump – 7.07 (Hangzhou 2014)
- Shot put – 14.83 (Doha 2016)
- Heptathlon – 5607 (Doha 2016)
