= Kätlin Piirimäe =

Estonian athletics competitor

Kätlin Piirimäe (born 8 November 1995) is an Estonian athletics competitor.

She was born in Viljandi. In 2016 she graduated from Järvamaa Vocational College (Estonian: Järvamaa Kutsehariduskeskus).

She started her athletics exercising in 2009, coached by her mother Külli Tambre. She won a bronze medal in shot put at the 2013 European Athletics Junior Championships.

She is 15-times Estonian shot put champion (2012–2022).

Her personal best in shot put is 16.80 (2013), and in discus throw is 46.80 (2017).
