= Kiran Baliyan =

Indian shot putter

Personal information
- Born: 6 March 2000 (age 26)
- Education: Chaudhary Charan Singh University

Sport
- Sport: shot put
Medal record
Women's athletics
Representing India
Asian Games
Bronze medal – third place	2020 Hangzhou	Shot put

Kiran Baliyan (born 6 March 2000) is a shot putter, hailing from Meerut.

== Early life and background ==
Kiran was born in 1999. She is native of Purbaliyan village of Muzaffarnagar district. Her father is a head constable in the Meerut Traffic Police.

== Career ==
2015: In November, Indian Under-18 Athletics Championships at Ranchi, she threw 12.49m in one of her first events at the National level.

2016: In November, she threw 14.62m in the Coimbatore Indian U20/U18/U16 Championships to take third place.

2017: On 6 May, she threw 15 metres and announced her arrival at a meet at Obra. Later in November 2017, she came first once again in Vijayawada in the Under-20 Indian Championships with a 14.54 throw. A month later, at Mangalagiri in December, she threw 14.37 to take the first place again.

2018: In April, she threw 15.23 at the Indian Under-20 Championships in Coimbatore to finish first. In the same year she made her international debut at Sri Lanka, and finished first with a throw of 14.77 at the South Asian U-20 Championships, Colombo. Later, she represented India at the Asian Junior Championships, Gifu but could only finish fifth.

2020: She set a national record of 17.14 meters at the 2022 National Games of India, winning gold at the women's shot put competition. Same year, she also won gold at the 2020 national inter-university athletics meet, representing Chaudhary Charan Singh University.

2023: She won a bronze medal at the 2022 Asian Games with a throw distance of 17.36m.
