= Yang Yansheng =

Chinese pole vaulter (born 1988)

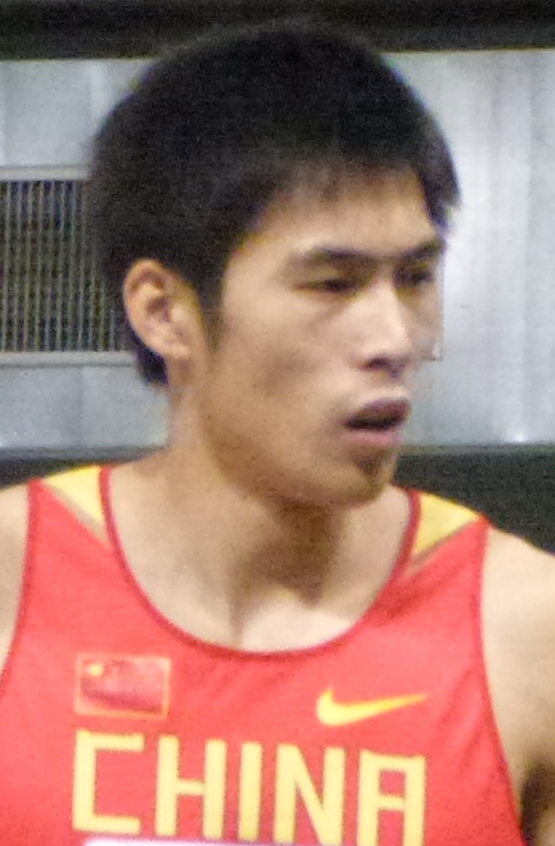
- Yang in 2012

Personal information
- Born: 5 January 1988 (age 38)
- Height: 1.90 m (6 ft 3 in)
- Weight: 75 kg (165 lb)

Sport
- Country: China
- Sport: Athletics
- Event: Pole vault
Medal record
Men's athletics
Representing China
Asian Indoor Championships
Gold medal – first place	2012 Hangzhou	Pole vault
Silver medal – second place	2006 Pattaya	Pole vault

Yang Yansheng (Chinese: 杨雁盛; born 5 January 1988) is a Chinese pole vaulter. He is the former Chinese record holder for the event both indoors and outdoors with bests of 5.80 and 5.75 metres respectively.

Born in Binzhou in China's Shandong province, Yang won the gold medal at the 2005 World Youth Championships and then took the silver at the 2005 National Games of China, finishing behind Liu Feiliang. He stepped up an age category and won at the Asian Junior Athletics Championships before taking the silver medal at the 2006 World Junior Championships. That same year he took silver at the 2006 Asian Indoor Athletics Championships behind Japan's Daichi Sawano and the bronze medal at the 2006 Asian Games.

He won the 2009 national championships with a height of 5.35 metres. He represented his region at the 11th National Games of China and won the bronze medal. A vault of 5.40 m brought him silver at the 2009 Asian Indoor Games.

He then competed at the 2010 World Indoor Championships without reaching the final. He excelled at national level however, winning the national title in August in Jinan with a Chinese record vault of 5.75 m. This also guaranteed him selection for the Asian Games. He became the pole vault champion at the 2010 Asian Games. He also came fifth for Asia at the 2010 IAAF Continental Cup.

His best vault of the 2011 season was a clearance of 5.60 m in Hefei. He was the bronze medalist at the 2011 Asian Athletics Championships. He started the following year in better form, taking the title at the 2012 Asian Indoor Athletics Championships, then clearing 5.65 m to win his first IAAF Diamond League meeting in Shanghai. He was selected for the 2012 London Olympics but failed to get past the qualifying stage. He ended his season with a 5.70 m vault to win the national title.

At the start of 2013 he set a national indoor record of 5.80 m at the PSD Bank Meeting in Germany. In the outdoor season he placed third at the IAAF World Challenge Beijing meet. In 2014, he finished ninth at the World Indoor Championship.
