= Hsieh Chia-han =

Taiwanese pole vaulter

Medal record

Men's athletics

Representing Chinese Taipei

East Asian Games
Bronze medal – third place	2009 Hong Kong	Pole vault

Asian Indoor Athletics Championships
Gold medal – first place	2014 Hangzhou	Pole vault

Hsieh Chia-han (Chinese: 謝佳翰; born 14 January 1988) is a Taiwanese pole vaulter. He is the national record holder with his personal best of 5.32 m (17 ft 5 1/4 in). He was the gold medallist at the Asian Indoor Athletics Championships in 2014.

== Career ==
He made his international debut at the 2005 World Youth Championships in Athletics and set a personal best of 4.70 m (15 ft 5 in) in the qualifying round. He cleared five metres for the first time in 2009, setting an outdoor best of 5.10 m (16 ft 8 3/4 in) and an indoor best of 5.12 m (16 ft 9 1/2 in). At the 2009 Universiade he did not get past the qualifying stages. He was a finalist at the 2009 Asian Athletics Championships (coming eighth) and took the bronze medal at the 2009 East Asian Games.

In 2010 he improved his best to 5.20 m (17 ft 1/2 in) and placed ninth at the Asian Games. He won four consecutive national titles from 2010 to 2013. The 21-year-old Taiwanese record in the pole vault fell to Hsieh in September 2011, breaking Lee Fu-an's long-standing mark by one centimetre with a clearance of 5.31 m (17 ft 5 in). He was the seventh-place finisher at the 2011 Asian Athletics Championships and improved to fifth place at the 2013 Asian Athletics Championships two years later. He improved the national record by a further centimetre in April 2013, but failed to return to the podium at the 2013 East Asian Games, where he was fourth overall.

He began his 2014 season in the United States and cleared 5.30 m (17 ft 4 1/2 in) indoors at the Pole Vault Summit in Reno, Nevada. He followed this national indoor record with a win at the 2014 Asian Indoor Athletics Championships.
