= New Zealand at the 2003 World Championships in Athletics =

New Zealand at the 2003 World Athletics Championships
- Flag of New Zealand
- WA code: NZL
- National federation: Athletics New Zealand

in Paris, France 23-31 August 2003
- Competitors: 12 (7 men and 5 women)
- Medals: Gold 0 Silver 0 Bronze 0 Total 0

World Athletics Championships appearances
- 1980; 1983; 1987; 1991; 1993; 1995; 1997; 1999; 2001; 2003; 2005; 2007; 2009; 2011; 2013; 2015; 2017; 2019; 2022; 2023; 2025

New Zealand competed at the 2003 World Athletics Championships. Their best placing was fifth, achieved by Valerie Vili in the Women's shot put. The men's 4x100m relay team broke the national record in their heat, but did not advance to the semi-finals.

== Entrants ==
Key

- Q = Qualified for the next round by placing (track events) or automatic qualifying target (field events)
- q = Qualified for the next round as a fastest loser (track events) or by position (field events)
- AR = Area (Continental) Record
- NR = National record
- PB = Personal best
- SB = Season best
- - = Round not applicable for the event

=== Individual events ===
Athlete	Event	Heat/Qualifying		Quarterfinal		Semifinal		Final	
Athlete	Event	Result	Rank	Result	Rank	Result	Rank	Result	Rank
Michael Aish	Men's 5000m	DNS	N/A	did not advance					
Michael Aish	Men's 10,000m	DNF	N/A	did not advance					
Craig Barrett	Men's 50km walk	—N/a						DQF	N/A
Adrian Blincoe	Men's 1500m	3:47.26	1 Q	—N/a		3:41.53	8	did not advance	
James Dolphin	Men's 200m	20.69	4 q	21.08	8	did not advance			
Beatrice Faumuina	Women's discus	63.12m	3 Q	—N/a				56.86m	12
Gabrielle Gorst	Women's 20km walk	—N/a						1:38:51	26
Melina Hamilton	Women's pole vault	4.00m	10	did not advance					
Rebecca Wardell	Women's 400m hurdles	56.54	5	did not advance					
Valerie Vili	Women's shot put	18.77m	2 Q	—N/a				18.65m	5

=== Relay events ===
Event	Heat/Qualifying		Semifinal		Final	
Event	Result	Rank	Result	Rank	Result	Rank
Men's 4x100m	39.25	5 NR	did not advance			
