= New Zealand at the 2009 World Championships in Athletics =

- WA code: NZL
- National federation: Athletics New Zealand
- Website: www.athletics.org.nz

in Berlin
- Competitors: 11
- Medals: Gold 1 Silver 0 Bronze 0 Total 1

World Championships in Athletics appearances
- 1980; 1983; 1987; 1991; 1993; 1995; 1997; 1999; 2001; 2003; 2005; 2007; 2009; 2011; 2013; 2015; 2017; 2019; 2022; 2023; 2025

New Zealand competed at the 2009 World Championships in Athletics that took place from 15–23 August. A team of 15 athletes was announced in preparation for the competition, but three were excluded for failing to meet qualifying standards, and Olympic 1500 metre medalist Nick Willis withdrew to recover from hip surgery. Selected athletes have achieved one of the competition's qualifying standards. The squad includes the defending world champion and Olympic champion in women's shot put Valerie Vili.

New Zealand's only medal came from Olympic and world champion Valerie Vili, who won the gold medal in the women's shot put.

== Team selection ==
Track and road events

Event	Athletes	
Event	Men	Women
200 metres		Monique Williams
400 metres		Monique Williams
800 metres		Nikki Hamblin
1500 metres		Nikki Hamblin
5000 metres		Kim Smith
10000 metres		Kim Smith
Marathon	Michael Aish	Shireen Crumpton; Mary Davies; Fiona Docherty
100 metres hurdles	—	Andrea Miller

Field and combined events

Event	Athletes	
Event	Men	Women
Javelin	Stuart Farquhar	
Shot put		Valerie Vili
Decathlon	Brent Newdick	—

== Results ==
=== Men ===
Track and road events

Event	Athletes	Final	
Event	Athletes	Result	Rank
Marathon	Michael Aish	DNF	

Field events

Event	Athletes	Qualification		Final	
Event	Athletes	Result	Rank	Result	Rank
Javelin	Stuart Farquhar	78.53 m	7	did not advance	
Decathlon	Brent Newdick	-		7915 pts PB	23

=== Women ===
Track and road events

Event	Athletes	Heat Round 1		Heat Round 2		Semifinal		Final	
Event	Athletes	Result	Rank	Result	Rank	Result	Rank	Result	Rank
200 m	Monique Williams	22.96 NR	2 Q	-		22.90 NR	3	did not advance	
400 m	Monique Williams	-							
800 m	Nikki Hamblin	2:31.94	7	did not advance					
1500 m	Nikki Hamblin	4:09.60	8 q	-		4:10.96	6	did not advance	
5000 m	Kim Smith	-							
10000 m	Kim Smith	-						31:21.42 SB	8
Marathon	Shireen Crumpton	-						2:41:31 SB	44
Marathon	Mary Davies	-						2:38:48 PB	35
Marathon	Fiona Docherty	-						2:40:18 PB	41
100 m hurdles	Andrea Miller	13.83	6	did not advance					

Field and combined events

Event	Athletes	Qualification		Final	
Event	Athletes	Result	Rank	Result	Rank
Shot put	Valerie Vili	19.70m	1	20.45m	Gold medal
