= New Zealand at the 2005 World Championships in Athletics =

New Zealand at the 2005 World Athletics Championships
- Flag of New Zealand
- WA code: NZL
- National federation: Athletics New Zealand

in Helsinki, Finland 6–14 August 2005
- Competitors: 14 (6 men and 8 women)
- Medals: Gold 0 Silver 1 Bronze 0 Total 1

World Athletics Championships appearances
- 1980; 1983; 1987; 1991; 1993; 1995; 1997; 1999; 2001; 2003; 2005; 2007; 2009; 2011; 2013; 2015; 2017; 2019; 2022; 2023; 2025

New Zealand competed at the 2005 World Championships in Athletics held in Helsinki, Finland. They won one medal, a silver, which was won by Valerie Vili (now Valerie Adams) in the shot put. Vili originally won the bronze medal, but was upgraded to silver after original gold medallist Nadzeya Ostapchuk subsequently failed a drug test. They placed 26th on the medal table.

== Entrants ==
Key

- Q = Qualified for the next round by placing (track events) or automatic qualifying target (field events)
- q = Qualified for the next round as a fastest loser (track events) or by position (field events)
- AR = Area (Continental) Record
- NR = National record
- PB = Personal best
- SB = Season best
- - = Round not applicable for the event

Athlete	Event	Heat/Qualifying		Semifinal		Final	
Athlete	Event	Result	Rank	Result	Rank	Result	Rank
Craig Barrett	Men's 50km walk	—				DQF	N/A
Adrian Blincoe	Men's 1500m	3:39.54	10 q	3:38.20	9	did not advance	
Shireen Crumpton	Women's marathon	—				2:37:03 PB	33
Beatrice Faumuina	Women's discus	59.81m	5 q	—		62.73m	4
Melina Hamilton	Women's pole vault	4.15m	12	did not advance			
Liza Hunter-Galvan	Women's marathon	—				2:39:47	39
Rebecca Moore	Women's marathon	—				2:50:36	45
Kim Smith	Women's 10,000m	—				31:24.29	15
Jason Stewart	Men's 800m	1:50.35	4	did not advance			
Kay Ulrich	Women's marathon	—				DNF	N/A
Valerie Vili	Women's shot put	19.87m	1 Q	—		19.62m	2nd place, silver medalist(s)
Nick Willis	Men's 1500m	3:39.89	3 Q	3:40.87	6	did not advance	
Scott Winton	Men's marathon	—				2:19:41	28
Jonathan Wyatt	Men's marathon	—				2:23:19	43
