= New Zealand at the 2022 World Athletics Championships =

- Flag of New Zealand
- WA code: NZL
- National federation: Athletics New Zealand

in Eugene, United States 15–24 July 2022
- Competitors: 20 (9 men and 11 women)
- Medals: Gold 0 Silver 0 Bronze 0 Total 0

World Athletics Championships appearances
- 1980; 1983; 1987; 1991; 1993; 1995; 1997; 1999; 2001; 2003; 2005; 2007; 2009; 2011; 2013; 2015; 2017; 2019; 2022; 2023; 2025

New Zealand sent a team of 20 athletes to the 2022 World Athletics Championships. Their best result was fourth place, achieved by Tom Walsh in the men's shot put.

== Entrants ==
Key

- Q = Qualified for the next round by placing (track events) or automatic qualifying target (field events)
- q = Qualified for the next round as a fastest loser (track events) or by position (field events)
- AR = Area (Continental) Record
- NR = National record
- PB = Personal best
- SB = Season best
- Where placings are listed as x(y), x = place in heat (for track events) or group (for field events), y = overall placing
- - = Round not applicable for the event

Athlete	Event	Heat/Qualifying		Semi-final		Final	
Athlete	Event	Result	Rank	Result	Rank	Result	Rank
Imogen Ayris	Women's pole vault	No Mark	N/A	did not advance			
Geordie Beamish	Men's 5000 m	13:36.86	12 (23)	did not advance			
Portia Bing	Women's 400 m hurdles	55.72	5 (20) q	55.53	6 (20)	did not advance	
Nicole Bradley	Women's hammer throw	62.88m	15 (30)	did not advance			
Lauren Bruce	Women's hammer throw	70.86m	7 (13)	did not advance			
Hamish Carson	Men's 5000 m	13:37.62	12 (25)	did not advance			
Rosie Elliott	Women's 400 m	54.92	8 (43)	did not advance			
Georgia Hulls	Women's 200 m	23.46	6 (35)	did not advance			
Jacko Gill	Men's shot put	21.24m	3 (5) Q	—		21.40m	7
Zoe Hobbs	Women's 100 m	11.08 AR	2 (12) Q	11.13	5 (14)	did not advance	
Hamish Kerr	Men's high jump	2.25m	8 (14)	did not advance			
Brad Mathas	Men's 800 m	1:47.70	7 (32)	did not advance			
Olivia McTaggart	Women's pole vault	4.50m	4 Q	—		No Mark	N/A
Edward Osei-Nketia	Men's 100m	10.08 NR	2 (16) Q	10.29	7 (22)	did not advance	
Tori Peeters	Women's javelin	53.67m	13 (24)	did not advance			
Julia Ratcliffe	Women's hammer throw	69.96m	8 (16)	did not advance			
Quentin Rew	Men's 20 km walk	—				1:29:19	35
Sam Tanner	Men's 1500 m	3:39.33	5 (28) Q	3:36.32	8 (8)	did not advance	
Tom Walsh	Men's shot put	21.44m	2 (3) Q	—		22.08m	4
Maddison-Lee Wesche	Women's shot put	18.96m	3 (8) Q	—		19.50m PB	7
