= New Zealand at the 2025 World Athletics Championships =

- Flag of New Zealand
- WA code: NZL

in Tokyo, Japan 13 September 2025 – 21 September 2025
- Competitors: 14 (7 men and 7 women)
- Medals Ranked 5th: Gold 2 Silver 0 Bronze 1 Total 3

World Athletics Championships appearances
- 1980; 1983; 1987; 1991; 1993; 1995; 1997; 1999; 2001; 2003; 2005; 2007; 2009; 2011; 2013; 2015; 2017; 2019; 2022; 2023; 2025

New Zealand competed at the 2025 World Athletics Championships in Tokyo, Japan, from 13 to 21 September 2025.

== Medallists ==
Medal	Athlete	Event	Date
Gold	Geordie Beamish	Men's 3000 metres steeplechase	September 15
Gold	Hamish Kerr	Men's high jump	September 16
Bronze	Maddi Wesche	Women's shot put	September 20

== Results ==
New Zealand entered 14 athletes to the championships: 7 women and 7 men.

Key

- Q = Qualified for the next round
- q = Qualified for the next round as a fastest loser or, in field events, by position without achieving the qualifying target
- NR = National record
- PB = Personal best
- SB = Season best
- N/A = Round not applicable for the event

=== Men ===
Track and road events

Athlete	Event	Heat		Semifinal		Final	
Athlete	Event	Result	Rank	Result	Rank	Result	Rank
Samuel Tanner	1500 metres	3:43.37	10	Did not advance			
Geordie Beamish	3000 metres steeplechase	8:27.23	2 Q	—N/a		8:33.88	1st place, gold medalist(s)

Field events

Athlete	Event	Qualification		Final	
Athlete	Event	Distance	Position	Distance	Position
Hamish Kerr	High jump	2.25	5 q	2.36 WL	1st place, gold medalist(s)
Ethan Olivier	Triple jump	16.60	16	Did not advance	
Nick Palmer	Shot put	20.18	15	Did not advance	
Tom Walsh	Shot put	21.74	1 Q	21.94 SB	4
Connor Bell	Discus throw	65.09	11 q	59.97	10

=== Women ===
Track and road events

Athlete	Event	Heat		Semifinal		Final	
Athlete	Event	Result	Rank	Result	Rank	Result	Rank
Zoe Hobbs	100 metres	11.16	2 Q	11.09	5	Did not advance	

Field events

Athlete	Event	Qualification		Final	
Athlete	Event	Distance	Position	Distance	Position
Imogen Ayris	Pole vault	4.60	1 q	4.45	10
Eliza McCartney	Pole vault	4.60	7 q	NM	
Olivia McTaggart	Pole vault	4.60	14 q	4.65	8
Maddison-Lee Wesche	Shot put	19.27	3 Q	20.06 PB	3rd place, bronze medalist(s)
Lauren Bruce	Hammer throw	69.19	19	Did not advance	
Tori Moorby	Javelin throw	62.78 SB	6 Q	61.53	7
