= New Zealand at the 2011 World Championships in Athletics =

- WA code: NZL
- National federation: Athletics New Zealand
- Website: www.athletics.org.nz

in Daegu
- Competitors: 8
- Medals: Gold 1 Silver 0 Bronze 0 Total 1

World Championships in Athletics appearances
- 1980; 1983; 1987; 1991; 1993; 1995; 1997; 1999; 2001; 2003; 2005; 2007; 2009; 2011; 2013; 2015; 2017; 2019; 2022; 2023; 2025

New Zealand competed at the 2011 World Championships in Athletics from August 27 to September 4 in Daegu, South Korea.

== Team selection ==
Reigning World Shot Put champion Valerie Adams leads the initial team selection for the championships. Adams, who also claimed the 2007 World title and 2008 Olympic Gold, was one of four 2010 Commonwealth Games medalists to be named in the first portion of Athletics New Zealand's selection process. Further selections will be announced in June and the final team selection will be announced after 8 August 2011.

The final team on the entry list comprises the names of 8 athletes.

== Medalists ==
The following competitors from New Zealand won medals at the Championships

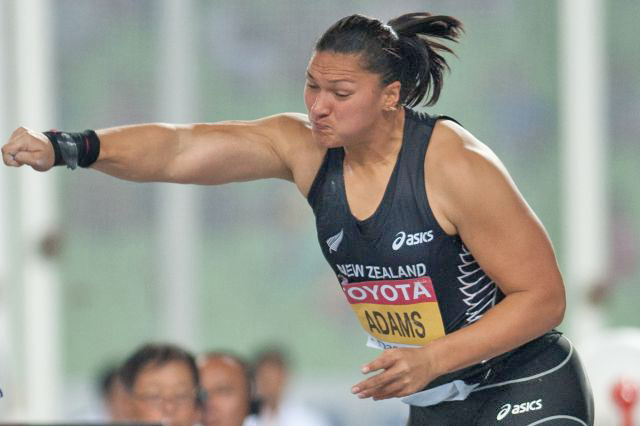
Valerie Adams defended her gold medal in Shot Put at Daegu for the second time in a row completing a hat trick

Medal	Athlete	Event
Gold	Valerie Adams	Shot put

== Results ==
=== Men ===
Athlete	Event	Preliminaries		Heats		Semifinals		Final	
Athlete	Event	Time Width Height	Rank	Time Width Height	Rank	Time Width Height	Rank	Time Width Height	Rank
Nick Willis	1500 metres			3:39.24	2	3:37.39	2	3:38.69	12
Jake Robertson	5000 metres			13:53.57	24 q			14:03.09	15
Adrian Blincoe	5000 metres			DNS				Did not advance	
Quentin Rew	50 kilometres walk							4:08:46	24
Stuart Farquhar	Javelin throw	82.10	3					78.99	11

Decathlon

Brent Newdick	Decathlon			
Brent Newdick	Event	Results	Points	Rank
	100 m	11.00	861	16
	Long jump	7.31	888	12
	Shot put	13.75	713	22
	High jump	1.96 SB	767	21
	400 m	49.95	817	17
	110 m hurdles	14.86	867	20
	Discus throw	45.65	780	12
	Pole vault	4.50	760	19
	Javelin throw	55.69	673	16
	1500 m	4:47.30	635	17
Total			7761	19

=== Women ===
Athlete	Event	Preliminaries		Heats		Semifinals		Final	
Athlete	Event	Time Width Height	Rank	Time Width Height	Rank	Time Width Height	Rank	Time Width Height	Rank
Nikki Hamblin	800 metres			2:02.87 SB	25	Did not advance			
Nikki Hamblin	1500 metres			4:36.70	35	Did not advance			
Valerie Adams	Shot put	19.79	1					21.24 CR, AR, WL	1st place, gold medalist(s)
