= New Zealand at the 2007 World Championships in Athletics =

- WA code: NZL
- National federation: Athletics New Zealand
- Website: www.athletics.org.nz

in Osaka
- Competitors: 10
- Medals: Gold 1 Silver 0 Bronze 0 Total 1

World Championships in Athletics appearances
- 1980; 1983; 1987; 1991; 1993; 1995; 1997; 1999; 2001; 2003; 2005; 2007; 2009; 2011; 2013; 2015; 2017; 2019; 2022; 2023; 2025

New Zealand competed at the 2007 World Championships in Athletics with a team of ten athletes. Valerie Vili won New Zealand's only medal with a gold medal in the women's shot put.

== New Zealand Team ==
=== Men ===
200 m: James Dolphin
1500 m: Nick Willis, Gareth Hyett
10,000 m: Michael Aish
50 km Race Walk: Tony Sargisson
Javelin Throw: Stuart Farquhar

=== Women ===
5000 m: Kimberley Smith
10,000 m: Kimberley Smith
Shot Put Throw: Valerie Vili
Discus Throw: Beatrice Faumuina
Marathon: Nina Rillstone

== Results ==
=== Men ===
Track and road events

| Event | Athletes | Heat Round 1 | | Quarter-final | | Semi-final | | Final | |
| Event | Athletes | Result | Rank | Result | Rank | Result | Rank | Result | Rank |
|---|---|---|---|---|---|---|---|---|---|
| 200 m | James Dolphin | 20.65 q SB | 6 | 20.80 | 8 | did not advance | | | |
| 1500 m | Gareth Hyett | 3:45.70 | 11 | did not advance | | | | | |
| 1500 m | Nick Willis | 3:40.18 q | 7 | | | 3:43.34 Q | 5 | 3:36.13 | 10 |
| 10000 m | Michael Aish | - | | | | | | 30:34.16 | 18 |
| 50km walk | Tony Sargisson | - | | | | | | DNF | |

Field events

| Event | Athletes | Qualification | | Final | |
| Event | Athletes | Result | Rank | Result | Rank |
|---|---|---|---|---|---|
| Javelin | Stuart Farquhar | 78.08m SB | 11 | did not advance | |

=== Women ===
Track and road events

| Event | Athletes | Final | |
| Event | Athletes | Result | Rank |
|---|---|---|---|
| 5000 m | Kimberley Smith | - | |
| 10000 m | Kimberley Smith | 32:06.89 | 5 |
| Marathon | Nina Rillstone | 2:33:58 SB | 13 |

Field and combined events

| Event | Athletes | Qualification | | Final | |
| Event | Athletes | Result | Rank | Result | Rank |
|---|---|---|---|---|---|
| Discus | Beatrice Faumuina | 55.75m | 12 | did not advance | |
| Shot put | Valerie Vili | 19.45m | 1 | 20.54m WL | Gold medal |
