= New Zealand at the 2001 World Championships in Athletics =

New Zealand at the 2001 World Athletics Championships
- Flag of New Zealand
- WA code: NZL
- National federation: Athletics New Zealand

in Helsinki, Finland 3-12 August 2001
- Competitors: 4 (2 men and 2 women) in 4 events
- Medals Ranked N/Ath: Gold 0 Silver 0 Bronze 0 Total 0

World Athletics Championships appearances
- 1980; 1983; 1987; 1991; 1993; 1995; 1997; 1999; 2001; 2003; 2005; 2007; 2009; 2011; 2013; 2015; 2017; 2019; 2022; 2023; 2025

New Zealand competed at the 2001 World Championships in Athletics held in Edmonton, Canada. They did not have any athletes placed in the top 8 in any event.

== Entrants ==
Key

- Q = Qualified for the next round by placing (track events) or automatic qualifying target (field events)
- q = Qualified for the next round as a fastest loser (track events) or by position (field events)
- AR = Area (Continental) Record
- NR = National record
- PB = Personal best
- SB = Season best
- Placing x(y): x = place in group/heat; y = place in final
- - = Round not applicable for the event

Athlete	Event	Heat/Qualifying		Semifinal		Final	
Athlete	Event	Result	Rank	Result	Rank	Result	Rank
Craig Barrett	Men's 50km walk	—N/a				DNF	N/A
Jenny Dryburgh	Women's Pole Vault	4.25m	9 (19)	did not advance			
John Henwood	Men's 10,000m	—N/a				29:01.62	25
Tasha Williams	Women's Hammer	63.83m	9 (15)	did not advance			
