= New Zealand at the 2017 World Championships in Athletics =

- Flag of New Zealand
- WA code: NZL
- National federation: Athletics New Zealand
- Website: athletics.org.nz

in London, United Kingdom 4–13 August 2017
- Competitors: 12 (8 men and 4 women) in 13 events
- Medals Ranked =23rd: Gold 1 Silver 0 Bronze 0 Total 1

World Championships in Athletics appearances
- 1980; 1983; 1987; 1991; 1993; 1995; 1997; 1999; 2001; 2003; 2005; 2007; 2009; 2011; 2013; 2015; 2017; 2019; 2022; 2023; 2025

New Zealand competed at the 2017 World Championships in Athletics in London, United Kingdom, from 4 to 13 August 2017. A total 12 athletes completed in 13 events.

== Medallists ==
Medal	Athlete	Event	Date
Gold	Tomas Walsh	Men's shot put	6 August

== Results ==
=== Men ===
Track and road events

Athlete	Event	Preliminary Round		Heat		Semifinal		Final	
Athlete	Event	Result	Rank	Result	Rank	Result	Rank	Result	Rank
Joseph Millar	100 metres	10.29	7 Q	10.31	33	Did not advance			
Joseph Millar	200 metres	—N/a		20.97	39	Did not advance			
Nick Willis	1500 metres	—N/a		3:42.75	16 Q	3:38.68	6 q	3:36.82	8
Zane Robertson	10,000 metres	—N/a						27:48.59 SB	16
Quentin Rew	50 kilometres walk	—N/a						3:46:29 NR	12

Field events

Athlete	Event	Qualification		Final	
Athlete	Event	Distance	Position	Distance	Position
Jacko Gill	Shot put	20.96	5 Q	20.82	9
Tomas Walsh	Shot put	22.14 SB	1 Q	22.03	1st place, gold medalist(s)
Marshall Hall	Discus throw	56.64	30	Did not advance	
Ben Langton-Burnell	Javelin throw	76.46	24	Did not advance	

=== Women ===
Track and road events

Athlete	Event	Heat		Semifinal		Final	
Athlete	Event	Result	Rank	Result	Rank	Result	Rank
Angie Petty	800 metres	2:01.76	21	Did not advance			
Camille Buscomb	5000 metres	15:40.41	30	—N/a		Did not advance	
Camille Buscomb	10,000 metres	—N/a				33:07.53	30

Field events

Athlete	Event	Qualification		Final	
Athlete	Event	Distance	Position	Distance	Position
Eliza McCartney	Pole vault	4.50	12 q	4.55	9
Julia Ratcliffe	Hammer throw	64.72	26	Did not advance	
