= New Zealand at the 1999 World Championships in Athletics =

New Zealand at the 1999 World Athletics Championships
- Flag of New Zealand
- WA code: NZL
- National federation: Athletics New Zealand

in Seville, Spain 21-29 August 1999
- Competitors: 7 (4 men and 3 women) in 8 events
- Medals Ranked 43rd: Gold 0 Silver 0 Bronze 0 Total 0

World Athletics Championships appearances
- 1980; 1983; 1987; 1991; 1993; 1995; 1997; 1999; 2001; 2003; 2005; 2007; 2009; 2011; 2013; 2015; 2017; 2019; 2022; 2023; 2025

New Zealand competed at the 1999 World Championships in Athletics held in Seville, Spain. Their best performances were 5th (by Beatrice Faumuina in the women's discus) and 7th (by Craig Barrett in men's 50km race walk).

== Entrants ==
Key

- Q = Qualified for the next round by placing (track events) or automatic qualifying target (field events)
- q = Qualified for the next round as a fastest loser (track events) or by position (field events)
- AR = Area (Continental) Record
- NR = National record
- PB = Personal best
- SB = Season best
- Placing x(y): x = place in group/heat; y = place in final
- - = Round not applicable for the event

| Athlete | Event | Heat/Qualifying | | Quarterfinal | | Semifinal | | Final | |
| Athlete | Event | Result | Rank | Result | Rank | Result | Rank | Result | Rank |
|---|---|---|---|---|---|---|---|---|---|
| Craig Barrett | Men's 50km walk | — | | | | | | 3:54:38 | 7 |
| Chantal Brunner | Women's long jump | 6.34m | 13 (22) | — | | | | did not advance | |
| Hamish Christensen | Men's 1500m | 3:41.11 | 10 | — | | did not advance | | | |
| Chris Donaldson | Men's 100m | 10.47 | 4 | did not advance | | | | | |
| Chris Donaldson | Men's 200m | 20.87 | 2 Q | 20.96 | 8 | did not advance | | | |
| Beatrice Faumuina | Women's discus | 64.18m | 2 (3) Q | — | | | | 64.62m | 5 |
| Toni Hodgkinson | Women's 800m | 2:02.18 | 6 | — | | did not advance | | | |
| Ian Winchester | Men's discus | 58.74m | 12 (24) | — | | | | did not advance | |
