= New Zealand at the 2019 World Athletics Championships =

- WA code: NZL
- National federation: Athletics New Zealand
- Website: athletics.org.nz

in Doha, Qatar 27 September 2019 – 6 October 2019
- Competitors: 13
- Medals Ranked 31st: Gold 0 Silver 0 Bronze 1 Total 1

World Athletics Championships appearances
- 1980; 1983; 1987; 1991; 1993; 1995; 1997; 1999; 2001; 2003; 2005; 2007; 2009; 2011; 2013; 2015; 2017; 2019; 2022; 2023; 2025

New Zealand competed at the 2019 World Athletics Championships in Doha, Qatar, from 27 September to 6 October 2019.

== Medalists ==
Medal	Name	Event	Date
Bronze	Tomas Walsh	Men's shot put	5 October

== Results ==
Key

- Q = Qualified for the next round
- q = Qualified for the next round as a fastest loser or, in field events, by position without achieving the qualifying target
- NR = National record
- PB = Personal best
- SB = Season best
- N/A = Round not applicable for the event

=== Men ===
Track and road events

Athlete	Event	Heat		Semifinal		Final	
Athlete	Event	Result	Rank	Result	Rank	Result	Rank
Eddie Osei-Nketia	100 metres	10.24	26	Did not advance			
Malcolm Hicks	Marathon	—N/a				2:17:45	27
Caden Shields	Marathon	—N/a				2:18:08	30
Quentin Rew	50 kilometres walk	—N/a				4:15:54	11

Field events

Athlete	Event	Qualification		Final	
Athlete	Event	Distance	Position	Distance	Position
Hamish Kerr	High jump	2.22	23	Did not advance	
Jacko Gill	Shot put	21.12	7 Q	21.45	7
Tom Walsh	Shot put	21.92	1 Q	22.90 AR	3rd place, bronze medalist(s)

=== Women ===
Track and road events

Athlete	Event	Heat		Semifinal		Final	
Athlete	Event	Result	Rank	Result	Rank	Result	Rank
Zoe Hobbs	100 metres	11.58	39	Did not advance			
Zoe Hobbs	200 metres	23.94	42	Did not advance			
Camille Buscomb	5000 metres	15:02.19 PB	9 Q	—N/a		14:58.59 PB	12
Camille Buscomb	10,000 metres	—N/a				31:13.21 PB	12
Portia Bing	400 metres hurdles	DQ	–	Did not advance			
Alana Barber	20 kilometres walk	—N/a				1:40:59	27

Field events

Athlete	Event	Qualification		Final	
Athlete	Event	Distance	Position	Distance	Position
Maddi Wesche	Shot put	17.22	25	Did not advance	
Julia Ratcliffe	Hammer throw	70.45	14	Did not advance	
