= New Zealand at the 1997 World Championships in Athletics =

New Zealand at the 1997 World Athletics Championships
- Flag of New Zealand
- WA code: NZL
- National federation: Athletics New Zealand

in Helsinki, Finland 1-10 August 1997
- Competitors: 12 (8 men and 4 women)
- Medals Ranked 22nd: Gold 1 Silver 0 Bronze 0 Total 1

World Athletics Championships appearances
- 1980; 1983; 1987; 1991; 1993; 1995; 1997; 1999; 2001; 2003; 2005; 2007; 2009; 2011; 2013; 2015; 2017; 2019; 2022; 2023; 2025

New Zealand competed at the 1997 World Championships in Athletics held in Athens, Greece. The team won one medal, a gold, which was won by Beatrice Faumuina in the discus, which placed them equal 22nd on the medal table. This was New Zealand's first medal at a World Athletics Championships.

== Entrants ==
Key

- Q = Qualified for the next round by placing (track events) or automatic qualifying target (field events)
- q = Qualified for the next round as a fastest loser (track events) or by position (field events)
- AR = Area (Continental) Record
- NR = National record
- PB = Personal best
- SB = Season best
- - = Round not applicable for the event
- x(y): x = placing in heat/group; y = overall placing

=== Individual Events ===
Athlete	Event	Heat/Qualifying		Quarterfinal		Semifinal		Final	
Athlete	Event	Result	Rank	Result	Rank	Result	Rank	Result	Rank
Nyla Carroll	Women's 10,000m	DNF	N/A	—				Did Not Advance	
Chris Donaldson	Men's 100m	10.43	3 (50) Q	10.40	8 (40)	Did Not Advance			
Chris Donaldson	Men's 200m	20.75	2 (22) Q	21.04	3 (24) Q	20.92	8 (15)	Did Not Advance	
Beatrice Faumuina	Women's discus	64.58m	2 (4) Q	—				66.82m	1st place, gold medalist(s)
Joanne Henry	Women's heptathlon	—						6601	15
Toni Hodgkinson	Women's 800m	2:02.21	3 (15) q	—		2:00.25	4 (9) Q	2:00.40	6
Glenn Howard	Men's high jump	2.15m	15 (31)	—				Did Not Advance	
Gavin Lovegrove	Men's javelin	75.62m	10 (21)	—					
Gus Nketia	Men's 100m	10.41	5 (45)	Did Not Advance					
Doug Pirini	Men's decathlon	—						DNF	N/A
Mark Tonks	Men's 800m	1:48.85	6 (36)	Did Not Advance					

Note: Doug Pirini completed three events in the decathlon, but withdrew after failing to record a height in the high jump.

=== Team Events ===
Event	Athletes	Heat/Qualifying		Semifinal		Final	
Event	Athletes	Result	Rank	Result	Rank	Result	Rank
Men's 4×100m	Gus Nketia, Chris Donaldson, Paul Gibbons, Donald MacDonald	39.66	7(17)	Did Not Advance			
