= New Zealand at the 2013 World Championships in Athletics =

- WA code: NZL

in Moscow
- Competitors: 9
- Medals: Gold 0 Silver 0 Bronze 0 Total 0

World Championships in Athletics appearances
- 1980; 1983; 1987; 1991; 1993; 1995; 1997; 1999; 2001; 2003; 2005; 2007; 2009; 2011; 2013; 2015; 2017; 2019; 2022; 2023

New Zealand is competing at the 2013 World Championships in Athletics in Moscow, Russia, from 10–18 August 2013. A team of 9 athletes was announced to represent the country in the event.

== Results ==
(q – qualified, NM – no mark, SB – season best)

=== Men ===
Track and road events

Athlete	Event	Preliminaries		Heats		Semifinals		Final	
Athlete	Event	Time	Rank	Time	Rank	Time	Rank	Time	Rank
Nicholas Willis	1500 metres								
Zane Robertson	5000 metres								
Jake Robertson	5000 metres								
Jake Robertson	10,000 metres								
Quentin Rew	50 kilometres walk								

Field events

Athlete	Event	Preliminaries		Final	
Athlete	Event	Width Height	Rank	Width Height	Rank
Stuart Farquhar	Javelin throw				

Decathlon

Brent Newdick	Decathlon			
Brent Newdick	Event	Results	Points	Rank
	100 m			
	Long jump			
	Shot put			
	High jump			
	400 m			
	110 m hurdles			
	Discus throw			
	Pole vault			
	Javelin throw			
	1500 m			
Total				

=== Women ===
Track and road events

Athlete	Event	Preliminaries		Heats		Semifinals		Final	
Athlete	Event	Time	Rank	Time	Rank	Time	Rank	Time	Rank
Angie Smit	800 metres								
Mary Davies	Marathon								

Field events

Athlete	Event	Preliminaries		Final	
Athlete	Event	Width Height	Rank	Width Height	Rank
Valerie Adams	Shot put				

== See also ==
New Zealand at other World Championships in 2013

- New Zealand at the 2013 UCI Road World Championships
- New Zealand at the 2013 World Aquatics Championships
