= List of Oceanian youth bests in athletics =

Oceanian youth bests are ratified by the Oceania Athletics Association (OAA) and comprise the all-time best marks set in competition by Oceanian athletes aged 17 or younger throughout the entire calendar year of the performance. OAA does not maintain official indoor bests. All indoor bests shown on this list are tracked by statisticians not officially sanctioned by the governing body.

== Outdoor ==
Key: Awaiting ratification Best not kept by OAA Not ratified or later rescinded by OAA

=== Boys ===
Event	Record	Athlete	Nationality	Date	Meet	Place	Age	Ref.
100 m	10.27 (+0.8 m/s)	Sebastian Sultana	Australia	30 October 2022 (Note: by OAA source; 29 October 2022 by World Athletics source)	Illawong High Velocity Meet #4	Sydney, Australia	17 years, 48 days	
100 m	10.17 (+0.9 m/s)	Gout Gout	Australia	7 December 2024	Australian All Schools Championships	Brisbane, Australia	16 years, 344 days	
200 m	20.69 (+1.4 m/s)	Gout Gout	Australia	27 January 2024	Denise Boyd Shield	Brisbane, Australia	16 years, 29 days	
200 m	20.60 (−0.7 m/s)	Gout Gout	Australia	30 August 2024	World U20 Championships	Lima, Peru	16 years, 245 days	
200 m	20.29 (+1.2 m/s)	Gout Gout	Australia	3 November 2024	Queensland All-Schools Championships	Brisbane, Australia	16 years, 310 days	
200 m	20.04 (+1.5 m/s)	Gout Gout	Australia	7 December 2024	Australian All-Schools Championships	Brisbane, Australia	16 years, 344 days	
300 m	33.16	Paul Greene	Australia	26 January 1989		Canberra, Australia	16 years, 48 days	
400 m	45.96	Paul Greene	Australia	19 August 1989		Saga, Japan	16 years, 253 days	
400 m	45.64	Terrell Thorne	Australia	8 December 2024		Brisbane, Australia	17 years, 217 days	
800 m	1:47.24	Paul Byrne	Australia	11 December 1993		Canberra, Australia	17 years, 316 days	
800 m	1:45.86	Sam Ruthe	New Zealand	17 January 2026	Allan & Sylvia Potts Classic	Hastings, New Zealand	16 years, 280 days	
1000 m	2:23.1 h	Michael Power	Australia	7 January 1993		Melbourne, Australia	16 years, 243 days	
1000 m	2:17.82	Sam Ruthe	New Zealand	3 January 2026	Tauranga Twilight meet	Tauranga, New Zealand	16 years, 266 days	
1500 m	3:33.26	Cameron Myers	Australia	16 July 2023	Kamila Skolimowska Memorial	Chorzów, Poland	17 years, 37 days	
Mile	3:55.44 (Note: by official result and World Athletics sources; 3:55.54 by OAA source, a typo)	Cameron Myers	Australia	23 February 2023	Maurie Plant Meet – Melbourne	Melbourne, Australia	16 years, 259 days	
Mile	3:53.83	Sam Ruthe	New Zealand	24 January 2026	Pak'n Save Cooks International Classic	Whanganui, New Zealand	16 years, 287 days	
2000 m	5:15.5 h	Mark Arens	Australia	23 March 1962		Adelaide, Australia		
3000 m	7:52.06	Cameron Myers	Australia	11 March 2023 (Note: by official result and World Athletics sources; 11 February 2023 by OAA source, a typo)	Sydney Track Classic	Sydney, Australia	16 years, 275 days	
5000 m	14:07.92	Sam Clifford	Australia	14 November 2019		Box Hill, Australia		
5000 m	13:40.48	Sam Ruthe	New Zealand	20 December 2025	Night of 5's	Auckland, New Zealand	16 years, 252 days	
10,000 m	30:18.85	Alex Harvey	Australia	6 January 2024		Geelong, Australia	16 years, 110 days	
Half marathon								
Marathon								
110 m hurdles (91.4 cm)	12.87 (+1.6 m/s)	Sasha Zhoya	Australia	6 July 2019	French U18 Championships	Angers, France	17 years, 11 days	
110 m hurdles (99/100 cm)								
110 m hurdles (106.7 cm)								
400 m hurdles (84.0 cm)	51.62	Jack Love	Australia	16 April 2023	Australian U18 Championships	Brisbane, Australia	16 years, 357 days	
400 m hurdles (91.4 cm)								
2000 m steeplechase (91.4 cm)	5:43.73	Aaron Hunt	Australia	5 December 1988		Sydney, Australia		
3000 m steeplechase								
High jump	2.29 m	Tim Forsyth	Australia	12 August 1990		Plovdiv, Bulgaria	16 years, 360 days	
Pole vault	5.56 m	Sasha Zhoya	Australia/France	1 April 2019	Australian Junior Championships	Sydney, Australia	16 years, 280 days	
Long jump	8.01 m (+0.5 m/s)	Darcy Roper	Australia	16 July 2015	World Youth Championships	Cali, Colombia	17 years, 107 days	
Triple jump	15.84 m NWI	Dylan James	Australia	23 November 2019		Perth, Australia		
Shot put (5 kg)	24.45 m	Jacko Gill	New Zealand	19 December 2011	Auckland Millenium Shot Put Invitational	Auckland, New Zealand	16 years, 364 days	
Shot put (6 kg)	22.31 m	Jacko Gill	New Zealand	5 December 2011		North Shore City, New Zealand	16 years, 350 days	
Shot put (7.26 kg)	20.38 m	Jacko Gill	New Zealand	5 December 2011		North Shore City, New Zealand	16 years, 350 days	
Discus throw (1.5 kg)	69.67 m	Connor Bell	New Zealand	25 August 2018		Auckland, New Zealand	17 years, 65 days	
Discus throw (1.75 kg)								
Discus throw (2 kg)	60.10 m	Werner Reiterer	Australia	21 December 1985		Melbourne, Australia	17 years, 328 days	
Hammer throw (5 kg)	82.08 m	Ned Weatherly	Australia	10 December 2015		Melbourne, Australia	17 years, 332 days	
Hammer throw (6 kg)								
Hammer throw (7.26 kg)								
Javelin throw (700 g)	77.80 m	Conor Warren	Australia	6 December 2015		Melbourne, Australia		
Javelin throw (800 g)								
Octathlon	6491 pts	Jake Stein	Australia	6–7 July 2011	World Youth Championships	Lille, France	17 years, 171 days	
Octathlon	100m (wind) / Long jump (wind) / Shot put / 400m / 110m H (wind) / High jump / Javelin / 1000m; 11.52 (−0.5 m/s) / 7.22 m (+1.2 m/s) / 17.22 m / 51.32 / 14.25 (−1.0 m/s) / 1.98 m / 59.65 m / 2:52.93							
Decathlon (Youth)	7559 pts	Ashley Moloney	Australia	29–30 March 2017	Australian U18 Championships	Sydney, Australia	17 years, 17 days	
Decathlon (Youth)	100m (wind) / Long jump (wind) / Shot put / High jump / 400m / 110m H (wind) / Discus / Pole vault / Javelin / 1500m; 10.84 (+0.5 m/s) / 7.11 m (−1.0 m/s) / 14.97 m / 2.03 m / 49.01 / 13.98 (−0.1 m/s) / 36.40 m / 4.40 m / 44.04 m / 5:03.21							
Mile walk	6:08.45	Riley Coughlan	Australia	14 December 2023	Collingwood Classic	Melbourne, Australia	16 years, 334 days	
3000 m walk	11:42.04	Troy Sundstrom	Australia	21 February 1998		Sydney, Australia	16 years, 297 days	
3000 m walk	11:32.9 h	Douglas Connolly	Australia	27 November 1999		Sydney, Australia		
5000 m walk	19:58.64	Douglas Connolly	Australia	12 December 1999		Sydney, Australia		
5000 m walk	19:51.81	Isaac Beacroft	Australia	15 April 2023	Australian U18 Championships	Brisbane, Australia	15 years, 271 days	
5 km walk (road)	20:55	Owen Toyne	Australia	12 February 2023	Australian U20 Race Walk Championships	Fawkner Park, Australia	15 years, 248 days	
10,000 m walk (track)	40:44.47	Isaac Beacroft	Australia	11 April 2024	Australian Championships	Adelaide, Australia	16 years, 268 days	
10 km walk (road)	39:56	Isaac Beacroft	Australia	21 April 2024	World Athletics Race Walking Team Championships	Antalya, Turkey	16 years, 278 days	
20,000 m walk (track)								
20 km walk (road)								
50,000 m walk (track)								
50 km walk (road)								
4 × 100 m relay	40.85	Barnett; Richardson; Manns; Chodat	Australia	4 December 2008		Canberra, Australia		
4 × 100 m relay	40.48		Australia	14 March 2014				
4 × 200 m relay	1:26.75	Wong; Easton; Lilley; Cox	Australia	9 December 1981		Brisbane, Australia		
4 × 400 m relay	3:14.39	Klabbers; Nevin; Longmuir; Reed	Australia	30 March 1984		Melbourne, Australia		
4 × 800 m relay	7:46.20	Andreatti; Fitzgerald; Bromley; Hall	Australia	17 December 2000		Sydney, Australia		
4 × 1500 m relay	16:04.7 h	Ellis; Howley; McMahon; Millichamp	Australia	17 December 1989		Melbourne, Australia		
Swedish medley relay	1:53.98	Browning; Wood; Shelley; Stenmark	Australia	7 December 2014		Adelaide, Australia		

=== Girls ===
Event	Record	Athlete	Nationality	Date	Meet	Place	Age	Ref.
100 m	11.20 (+1.2 m/s)	Raelene Boyle	Australia	15 October 1968	Olympic Games	Mexico City, Mexico	17 years, 113 days	
100 m	11.14 (+1.7 m/s)	Leah O'Brian	Australia	8 April 2025	Australian U18 Championships	Perth, Australia	17 years, 69 days	
200 m	22.74 (+2.0 m/s)	Raelene Boyle	Australia	18 October 1968	Olympic Games	Mexico City, Mexico	17 years, 116 days	
400 m	51.80	Jana Pittman	Australia	12 December 1999		Sydney, Australia	17 years, 33 days	
800 m	2:00.81	Keely Small	Australia	12 April 2018	Commonwealth Games	Gold Coast, Australia	16 years, 307 days	
1000 m	2:36.72	Claudia Hollingsworth	Australia	8 March 2021		Box Hill, Australia	15 years, 330 days	
1500 m	4:06.77	Georgie Clarke	Australia	30 January 2000	Optus Grand Prix	Hobart, Australia	15 years, 227 days	
Mile	4:32.73	Susan Power	Australia	17 December 1992		Melbourne, Australia		
2000 m	5:56.3 h	Angela Raines-White	Australia	27 November 1988		Brisbane, Australia		
3000 m	9:00.60	Amy Bunnage	Australia	15 December 2022		Melbourne, Australia	17 years, 268 days	
5000 m	16:06.01	Katrina Robinson	New Zealand	16 June 2001		Brisbane, Australia		
5000 m	15:18.6 Mx	Eloise Poppett	Australia	18 October 1999		Sydney, Australia	16 years, 335 days	
10,000 m								
Half marathon								
Marathon								
100 m hurdles (76.2 cm)	13.02 (+1.8 m/s)	Delta Amidzovski	Australia	16 April 2023	Australian U18 Championships	Brisbane, Australia	16 years, 236 days	
100 m hurdles (84 cm)								
200 m hurdles	27.91	Jess Gulli	Australia	21 March 2003		Sydney, Australia	15 years, 2 days	
400 m hurdles	56.23	Jana Pittman	Australia	18 December 1999		Sydney, Australia	17 years, 39 days	
2000 m steeplechase	6:25.77	Melissa Rollison	Australia	1 May 2000		Sydney, Australia	17 years, 18 days	
3000 m steeplechase	10:10.73	Melissa Rollison	Australia	25 February 2000	Australian Championships	Sydney, Australia	16 years, 318 days	
High jump	1.96 m	Eleanor Patterson	Australia	7 December 2013	Australian All Schools Championships	Townsville, Australia	17 years, 199 days	
Pole vault	4.40 m	Vicky Parnov	Australia	30 June 2007		Saulheim, Germany	16 years, 249 days	
Pole vault	4.40 m	Liz Parnov	Australia	17 April 2010		Perth, Australia	15 years, 343 days	
Pole vault	4.40 m	Nina Kennedy	Australia	24 July 2014		Eugene, United States	17 years, 110 days	
Pole vault	4.40 m	Olivia McTaggart	New Zealand	14 January 2017	Potts Classic	Hastings, New Zealand	17 years, 5 days	
Long jump	6.55 m (+1.9 m/s)	Nicole Boegman	Australia	15 October 1983		Sydney, Australia	16 years, 224 days	
Triple jump	13.30 m (−0.1 m/s)	Tianna Boras	Australia	6 August 2022	World U20 Championships	Cali, Colombia	17 years, 155 days	
Shot put (3 kg)	17.27 m	Allira Takau	Australia	17 April 2024		Adelaide, Australia	16 years, 130 days	
Shot put (4 kg)	17.08 m	Valerie Adams	New Zealand	13 July 2001		Debrecen, Hungary	16 years, 280 days	
Discus throw	58.52 m	Dani Samuels	Australia	26 November 2005		Sydney, Australia	17 years, 184 days	
Hammer throw (3 kg)	71.14 m	Alexandra Hulley	Australia	6 December 2014		Adelaide, Australia	17 years, 135 days	
Hammer throw (4 kg)								
Javelin throw (500 g)	56.01 m	Annabel Thompson	Australia	15 July 2004		Grosseto, Italy		
Javelin throw (500 g)	61.47 m	Mackenzie Little	Australia	11 July 2013	World Youth Championships	Donetsk, Ukraine	16 years, 196 days	
Heptathlon	5650 pts	Sharon Joklofsky	Australia	24 February 1985		Brisbane, Australia	16 years, 147 days	
Heptathlon	100m H (wind) / High jump / Shot put / 200m (wind) / Long jump (wind) / Javelin / 800m							
3000 m walk (track)	12:36.21	Natalie Saville	Australia	9 December 1995		Sydney, Australia	17 years, 153 days	
5000 m walk (track)	21:39.03	Katie Hayward	Australia	22 October 2016		Brisbane, Australia	16 years, 91 days	
5 km walk (road)	22:44	Katie Hayward	Australia	30 July 2017		Brisbane, Australia	17 years, 7 days	
5 km walk (road)	22:39	Tanya Holliday	Australia	5 November 2005		Adelaide, Australia	17 years, 45 days	
10,000 m walk (track)								
10 km walk (road)								
20,000 m walk (track)								
20 km walk (road)								
4 × 100 m relay	45.48	New South Wales Team; O'Gready; Thornton; Geddes; Kyriacou	Australia	14 March 2014		Sydney, Australia		
4 × 200 m relay	1:38.41	New South Wales Team; Gardner; Bannister; Turner; Morton	Australia	9 December 2007		Sydney, Australia		
Swedish relay	2:06.58	Jessica Gulli; Olivia Tauro; Megan Hill; Jaimee-Lee Hoegbergen	Australia	17 July 2005	World Youth Championships	Marrakesh, Morocco	17 years, 120 days	
4 × 400 m relay	3:42.47	Alton; Babbage; Hall; Moroney	Australia	21 March 1982		Brisbane, Australia		
4 × 800 m relay	8:57.62	Kajan; Tomsett; Neville; Doyle	Australia	21 November 2005		Sydney, Australia		
4 × 1500 m relay	18:22.47	Blacktown Team; L. Harding-Delooze; Evans; Hopper; A. Harding-Delooze	Australia	15 November 2015		Sydney, Australia		

=== Mixed ===
Event	Record	Athlete	Nation	Date	Meet	Place	Age	Ref.
4 × 400 m relay	3:25.08	Bendere Oboya; Sebastien Moir; Carley Thomas; Jordan Doris	Australia	23 July 2017	Commonwealth Youth Games	Nassau, Bahamas	17 years, 97 days 16 years, 209 days	

== Indoor ==
=== Boys ===
Event	Record	Athlete	Nationality	Date	Meet	Place	Age	Ref.
50 m								
60 m								
200 m								
400 m								
800 m								
1000 m								
1500 m	3:33.25+	Sam Ruthe	New Zealand	31 January 2026	BU John Thomas Terrier Classic	Boston, United States	16 years, 294 days	
Mile	3:48.88	Sam Ruthe	New Zealand	31 January 2026	BU John Thomas Terrier Classic	Boston, United States	16 years, 294 days	
2000 m								
3000 m								
5000 m								
50 m hurdles (91.4 cm)								
50 m hurdles (99/100 cm)								
50 m hurdles (106.7 cm)								
60 m hurdles (91.4 cm)	7.48	Sasha Zhoya	Australia	24 February 2019	French U18 Championships	Liévin, France	16 years, 244 days	
60 m hurdles (99/100 cm)								
60 m hurdles (106.7 cm)								
High jump								
Pole vault	5.32 m	Sasha Zhoya	Australia	23 February 2019	French U18 Championships	Liévin, France	16 years, 243 days	
Long jump								
Triple jump								
Shot put (5 kg)								
Shot put (6 kg)								
Shot put (7.26 kg)								
Heptathlon (Youth)								
Heptathlon (Youth)	60m / Long jump / Shot put / High jump / 60m H / Pole vault / 1000m							
Heptathlon (Junior)								
Heptathlon (Junior)	60m / Long jump / Shot put / High jump / 60m H / Pole vault / 1000m							
Heptathlon (Senior)								
Heptathlon (Senior)	60m / Long jump / Shot put / High jump / 60m H / Pole vault / 1000m							
5000 m walk								
4 × 200 m relay								
4 × 400 m relay								

=== Girls ===
Event	Record	Athlete	Nationality	Date	Meet	Place	Age	Ref.
50 m								
60 m								
200 m								
400 m								
800 m								
1000 m								
1500 m	4:13.21	Georgie Clarke	Australia	10 March 2001	World Championships	Lisbon, Portugal	16 years, 266 days	
Mile								
2000 m								
3000 m								
5000 m								
50 m hurdles (84 cm)								
60 m hurdles (76.2 cm)								
60 m hurdles (84 cm)								
High jump								
Pole vault	4.10 m	Olivia McTaggart	New Zealand	22 February 2017	Vertical Pursuit	Auckland, New Zealand	17 years, 44 days	
Long jump								
Triple jump								
Shot put (3 kg)								
Shot put (4 kg)								
Pentathlon (Senior)								
Pentathlon (Senior)	60m H / High jump / Shot put / Long jump / 800m							
3000 m walk (track)								
4 × 200 m relay								
4 × 400 m relay								
