= New Zealand at the 2015 World Championships in Athletics =

- WA code: NZL
- Website: www.athletics.org.nz

in Beijing
- Competitors: 14
- Medals: Gold 0 Silver 0 Bronze 0 Total 0

World Championships in Athletics appearances
- 1980; 1983; 1987; 1991; 1993; 1995; 1997; 1999; 2001; 2003; 2005; 2007; 2009; 2011; 2013; 2015; 2017; 2019; 2022; 2023; 2025

New Zealand competed at the 2015 World Championships in Athletics in Beijing, China, from 22–30 August 2015.

== Results ==
(q – qualified, NM – no mark, SB – season best)

=== Men ===
Track and road events

Athlete	Event	Heat		Semifinal		Final	
Athlete	Event	Result	Rank	Result	Rank	Result	Rank
Julian Matthews	1500 metres	3:39.55	16th Q	3:40.45	11th	Did not advance	
Nick Willis	1500 metres	3:38.27	3rd Q	3:43.57	14th Q	3:35.46	6th
Michael Cochrane	400 metres hurdles	49.58 NR	7th	—N/a			
Quentin Rew	20 kilometres walk	—N/a				1:22:18 SB	18th
Quentin Rew	50 kilometres walk	—N/a				3:48:48 PB	10th

Field events

Athlete	Event	Qualification		Final	
Athlete	Event	Distance	Position	Distance	Position
Tomas Walsh	Shot put	20.49m	7th q	21.58m AR	4th
Jacko Gill	Shot put	19.94m	12th q	20.11m	8th
Stuart Farquhar	Javelin throw	78.30m	23rd	—N/a	

=== Women ===
Track and road events

Athlete	Event	Heat		Semifinal		Final	
Athlete	Event	Result	Rank	Result	Rank	Result	Rank
Angie Petty	800 metres	2:00.62	16th q	1:59.53	16th	Did not advance	
Nikki Hamblin	1500 metres	4:16.65	31st	Did not advance			
Nikki Hamblin	5000 metres	DNS		—N/a		Did not advance	
Rosa Flanagan	3000 metres steeplechase	10:00.71	37th	—N/a		Did not advance	
Alana Barber	20 kilometres walk	—N/a				1:33:20 NR	18th

Field events

Athlete	Event	Qualification		Final	
Athlete	Event	Distance	Position	Distance	Position
Siositina Hakeai	Discus throw	54.89	30th	Did not advance	
Te Rina Keenan	Discus throw	59.20	18th	Did not advance	

Combined events – Heptathlon

Athlete	Event	100H	HJ	SP	200 m	LJ	JT	800 m	Final	Rank
Portia Bing	Result	13.59 PB	1.80 =PB	13.60 PB	24.00	5.95	34.69	2:14.88	6057	16th
Portia Bing	Points	1037	978	767	981	834	566	894	6057	16th
