= Athletics at the 2006 Commonwealth Games – Women's shot put =

Athletics event

Women's shot put at the Commonwealth Games

The women's shot put event at the 2006 Commonwealth Games was held on March 22. It was held in the Dawn McCluskey centre for athletics.

== Results ==
Rank	Athlete	Nationality	#1	#2	#3	#4	#5	#6	Result	Notes
1st place, gold medalist(s)	Valerie Vili	New Zealand	18.95	19.66	x	x	19.51	x	19.66	GR
2nd place, silver medalist(s)	Vivian Chukwuemeka	Nigeria	18.25	x	17.83	x	x	17.98	18.25	
3rd place, bronze medalist(s)	Cleopatra Borel-Brown	Trinidad and Tobago	17.26	x	x	17.54	17.87	17.16	17.87	
4	Zhang Guirong	Singapore	17.17	16.71	17.39	x	16.77	x	17.39	
5	Du Xianhui	Singapore	16.16	16.13	16.63	16.76	16.58	16.41	16.76	
6	Simoné du Toit	South Africa	x	16.52	x	15.94	16.14	16.29	16.52	
7	Ana Po'uhila	Tonga	16.43	15.89	16.21	16.14	15.80	15.86	16.43	
8	Joanne Duncan	England	16.14	16.42	16.30	16.01	15.73	x	16.42	
9	Marli Knoetze	South Africa	16.08	15.63	15.92				16.08	
10	Julie Dunkley	England	14.95	15.03	15.98				15.98	
11	Eva Massey	Northern Ireland	14.49	x	14.95				14.95	
12	Dani Samuels	Australia	14.91	14.27	x				14.91	
