= New Zealand at the 2023 World Athletics Championships =

- Flag of New Zealand
- WA code: NZL

in Budapest, Hungary 19 August 2023 – 27 August 2023
- Competitors: 19 (9 men and 10 women)
- Medals: Gold 0 Silver 0 Bronze 0 Total 0

World Athletics Championships appearances
- 1980; 1983; 1987; 1991; 1993; 1995; 1997; 1999; 2001; 2003; 2005; 2007; 2009; 2011; 2013; 2015; 2017; 2019; 2022; 2023

New Zealand competed at the 2023 World Athletics Championships in Budapest, Hungary, from 19 to 27 August 2023.

== Results ==
New Zealand entered 19 athletes.

Key

- Q = Qualified for the next round
- q = Qualified for the next round as a fastest loser or, in field events, by position without achieving the qualifying target
- NR = National record
- PB = Personal best
- SB = Season best
- N/A = Round not applicable for the event

=== Men ===
Track and road events

Athlete	Event	Heat		Semifinal		Final	
Athlete	Event	Result	Rank	Result	Rank	Result	Rank
Tiaan Whelpton	100 metres	10.26	6	Did not advance			
Brad Mathas	800 metres	1:45.95	5	Did not advance			
James Preston	800 metres	1:46.84	6	Did not advance			
Sam Tanner	1500 metres	3:46.93	4 Q	3:36.58	8	Did not advance	
George Beamish	3000 metres steeplechase	8:16.36	2 Q	—		8:13.46	5

Field events

Athlete	Event	Qualification		Final	
Athlete	Event	Distance	Position	Distance	Position
Hamish Kerr	High jump	2.22	19	Did not advance	
Jacko Gill	Shot put	21.49	6 Q	21.76	6
Tom Walsh	Shot put	21.73	3 Q	22.05	4
Connor Bell	Discus throw	63.72	12 q	63.23	10

=== Women ===
Track and road events

Athlete	Event	Heat		Semifinal		Final	
Athlete	Event	Result	Rank	Result	Rank	Result	Rank
Zoe Hobbs	100 metres	11.14	3 Q	11.02	4	Did not advance	
Georgia Hulls	200 metres	23.36	5	Did not advance			
Rosie Elliott	400 metres	52.88	8	Did not advance			
Portia Bing	400 metres hurdles	1:06.97	8	Did not advance			

Field events

Athlete	Event	Qualification		Final	
Athlete	Event	Distance	Position	Distance	Position
Imogen Ayris	Pole vault	4.50	18	Did not advance	
Eliza McCartney	Pole vault	NM		Did not advance	
Olivia McTaggart	Pole vault	4.35	24	Did not advance	
Maddison-Lee Wesche	Shot put	18.59	12 q	19.51 PB	7
Lauren Bruce	Hammer throw	67.10	28	Did not advance	
Tori Peeters	Javelin throw	59.59	13	Did not advance	
