= Nicole Aish =

American long-distance runner

Personal information
- Nationality: American
- Born: Nicole Jefferson; March 8, 1976 (age 50) Arvada, Colorado, United States

Sport
- Sport: Long-distance running
- Events: 3,000 metres, 5,000 metres, 10,000 metres, Marathon
Medal record
Representing United States
Pan American Games
Bronze medal – third place	2003 Santo Domingo	5000m

Nicole Aish (née Jefferson, born March 8, 1976) is a long-distance runner who is a U.S. National Championship Marathon winner and a bronze medalist at the 2003 Pan American Games in the 5,000 metres.

== Running career ==
Since she was cut from her high school basketball team, Aish decided to become a runner. She ran cross country and track at Western Colorado Mountaineers with Elva Dryer. Aish set multiple school records on her way to becoming the national champion at the 1998 and 1999 NCAA Division II Women's Outdoor Track and Field Championships in the 3,000 metres. She finished her college career also as the one mile national champion in the 1999 NCAA Division II Women's Indoor Track and Field Championships. She still holds the school record for fastest time in the mile (4:38.76).

Aish continued running after college. In 2001 she raced 3,000 metres at the Prefontaine Classic, where she placed 13th. Two years later, she ran a 32:10 in the 10,000 metres, qualifying for the 2004 U.S. Olympic Track Trials.

Aish continued racing track and road races around the country. Her first ever half-marathon was in the Monterey Peninsula of California, which she won. Aish then netted prize money for win a large 10k in Colorado. A year later, in 2005, she also won her first-ever marathon, the Twin Cities Marathon. She finished with a time of 2:40.21, which happened to be the slowest winning time, likely due to the heat—the temperature at the starting line was more than 70 degrees F. Although her hamstrings cramped and she walked briefly, Aish won with a comfortable lead. She won $30,000 and the title of U.S. National Marathon Champion.

Later in 2006, Aish had hip surgery, which stopped her from running in any more major races. She still competes in shorter distance races, such as the FireKraker 5k for the 4th of July in her hometown in Colorado. She has won nearly $85,000 in her running career so far.

== Early and personal life ==
Aish was previously married to Michael Aish, a long-distance runner who competed for the 2000 and 2004 New Zealand Olympic Team. They ran together and won respective men's and woman's titles in the Monterey Half Marathon. Aish started a blog about her personal and daily life but has not posted on it since 2014. Her last post was about a second hip surgery. She and Michael Aish divorced in 2017 and he has since remarried.

== Achievements ==
- 2001 Prefontaine Classic 3K 13th place 9:29.42
- 2003 Pan American Games 5K 3rd place 15:42.40
- 2003 Freihofer's Run for Women 5K 4th place 15:51
- 2004 Monterey Half-Marathon 1st place 1:15.13
- 2005 TD Banknorth Beach to Beacon 7th place 33:08.8
- 2005 Twin Cities Marathon 1st place 2:40.21
- 2005 Colorado 10k 1st place 34:57
- 2006 Spokane 12,000m Race 9th place 41:32
- 2008 Aramco Houston Half Marathon 4th place 1:12:30

== See also ==
- Twin Cities Marathon
- Michael Aish
- Prefontaine Classic
