= Sam Ruthe =

New Zealand runner (born 2009)

Personal information
- Born: 12 April 2009 (age 17)

Sport
- Country: New Zealand
- Sport: Athletics
- Event: middle distance running

Achievements and titles
- National finals: 1500 m champion (2025, 2026); 3000 m champion (2025)
- Personal bests: 800 m: 1:45.86 NU20R (Hastings 2026); 1500 m: 3:33.25i NR, WU18R (Boston 2026); Mile: 3:48.88i NR, WU18R (Boston 2026); 3000 m: 7:43.16 NU20R (Boston 2026); 5000 m: 13:40.48 NU20R

Sam Ruthe (born 12 April 2009) is a New Zealand middle and long-distance runner. In early 2025, he won a senior national title in the 1500 metres (Note: Title shared with Sam Tanner in a dead heat) and 3000 metres. He later became the youngest person in the world to run a mile in less than four minutes, running 3:58.35 at the age of 15, and the fastest time for the mile ever run by a 16 year-old with 3:53.83. At the 2026 John Thomas Terrier Classic, Ruthe ran the mile in 3:48.88 for a world under-18 best, with the 1500 metres intermediate time of 3:33.25 also being recognised as a world under-18 best. By February 2026, Ruthe held all the New Zealand U20 records between 800 metres and 5000 metres (except the 1000m).

== Early and personal life ==
From Tauranga in the Bay of Plenty Region, Ruthe's parents Ben and Jess were both champion runners in New Zealand. His grandparents Trevor Wright and Rosemary Wright (née Stirling) competed at the Olympic Games, with Rosemary being the 1970 Commonwealth Games gold medallist in the 800 metres, and Trevor being a silver medalist in the 1971 European Marathon Championship. Sam Ruthe suffered infant respiratory distress syndrome after birth and was on life support for his first five days, needing oxygen therapy at a saturation of almost 100%.

== Career ==
Ruthe trains under Craig Kirkwood in New Zealand in a group that includes Sam Tanner.

=== 2024 ===
At 15 years old in November, Ruthe set a 3000 metre personal best of 8:09.68 in Auckland, which broke the New Zealand under-17 and under-18 records in this event.

=== 2025 ===
In January, at the Cooks Classic meeting at Cooks Gardens in Whanganui, Ruthe ran the mile in a time of 4:01.72, reported to be 3.7 seconds quicker than the known world best for his age group.

On 1 February, Ruthe won the New Zealand senior men's 3000m national championship held at the Potts Classic Meet in Hastings. His time of 7:56.18 was a world best for his age group, and in winning Ruthe became the youngest national men's champion in New Zealand athletics history, beating the previous youngest male, Dave Norris, who was 17 when he won the triple jump in 1957. A few days later on 9 February, Ruthe ran 3:41.25 over 1500 metres at the Sir Graeme Douglas International in Auckland to beat Jakob Ingebrigtsen's world age-15 best of 3:42.44 from 2016.

On 9 March, Ruthe won the New Zealand national senior men's 1500 metre title at Dunedin's Caledonian Ground, tying for first with Sam Tanner in a time of 3:44.31. On 19 March, 25 days before his 16th birthday, Ruthe became the youngest person, and first 15-year-old, to run a sub-four minute mile, clocking 3:58.35 in Auckland.

Ruthe ran a new 1500 m personal best of 3:40.12 in the John Landy Mile at the Maurie Plant Meet in Melbourne, on 29 March 2025. On 12 July, he ran 3:39.17 to lower his own national under-17 and under-18 1500m records at the Sound Running Sunset Tour in Los Angeles.

In December 2025, at the New Zealand secondary schools championships, Ruthe set senior boys' records in both the 800 and 1500 metres, with times of 1:46.81 and 3:38.62 respectively. That month, he ran 13:40.48 in his debut race over 5000 metres, to set a New Zealand under-20 record, in Auckland.

=== 2026 ===
On 3 January 2026, Ruthe ran 1000 metres in 2:17.82, a world’s best for a 16 and 17 year old. The time was just over a second outside the Peter Snell New Zealand resident record time of 2:16.6 from 1964 and the John Walker national record of 2:16.57 set in 1980, but the paperwork for the record applications for the New Zealand under-20 and under-19 records was not forwarded to Athletics New Zealand. Later that month, he lowered his 800 metres personal best to 1:45.86 as he won the Potts Classic in Hastings. On 24 January, he ran the fastest mile by a 16 year-old with 3:53.83 at the Cooks Classic in Whanganui.

In his first ever indoor mile at the Boston University Terriers classic on 31 January, Ruthe won in 3:48.88. This was the eleventh fastest time ever recorded indoors, broke the absolute New Zealand mile record of 3:49.08 of John Walker from 1982, and the New Zealand indoor mile record of 3:51.06 set by Nick Willis in 2016. The time also set a new outright world under-18 best. In February in Boston at the Saucony Battle for Boston indoor event, Ruthe ran the 3000 metres in 7:43.16 to hold each of the New Zealand U20 middle distance records between 800m and 5000m (except the 1000m).

On 7 March, Ruthe ran 3:41.43 to win his second New Zealand national 1500m title.

== Notes ==
Awards
Preceded by Tyler Bindon	Halberg Awards – Emerging Talent Award; 2025	Incumbent
