= Fiona Docherty =

New Zealand athlete

- Born: 1 September 1975 (age 50); Taupō
- Known for: Running

Fiona Docherty (born 1975) is a multi-sport athlete and runner from New Zealand.

== Life ==
Docherty and her brother Bevan grew up in Taupō, in the North Island of New Zealand and attended Tauhara College. Their father Ray was a keen triathlete and their mother, Irene, and their children trained and competed with him.

Docherty competed in international triathlons and duathlons from 2002 to 2007. One of her most successful races was her first attempt at the Powerman Zofingen long distance duathlon in Switzerland in 2003, which she won.

In 2007, she was diagnosed with piriformis syndrome and underwent medical treatment. On recovery in late 2008, she decided to focus on running, and in 2010 she decided to target marathon running.
