= Michael Aish (athlete) =

New Zealand long-distance runner

Personal information
- Born: 24 July 1976 (age 50) New Plymouth, New Zealand

Sport
- Country: New Zealand
- Sport: Athletics
- Events: 5,000 m 10,000 m

Michael Aish (born 24 July 1976) is a New Zealand long-distance runner. He competed at the 2004 Summer Olympics in Athens, in the men's 5000 metres. He is a prolific runner with a 2:13:21 personal best time in the marathon. He was formerly married to woman's U.S. Marathon Champion Nicole Aish and is presently married to long-distance runner Christy Burns.
