= Sam Tanner =

New Zealand athlete (born 2000)

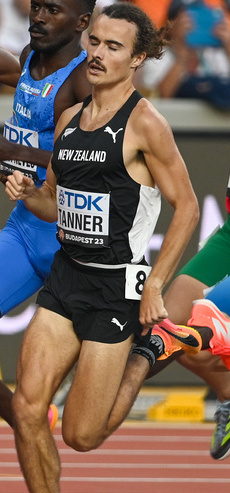
- Tanner in 2023

Personal information
- Full name: Samuel Tanner
- Born: 24 August 2000 (age 26) Papamoa, New Zealand
- Height: 1.70 m (5 ft 7 in)
- Weight: 56 kg (123 lb)

Sport
- Country: New Zealand
- Sport: Track and field
- Events: Middle-, long-distance running

Samuel Tanner (born 24 August 2000) is a New Zealand middle- and long-distance runner specialising in the 1500 metres. He is Māori; his iwi affiliation is Ngāpuhi. Tanner is the New Zealand indoor record holder for the 1500 metres.

== Biography ==
A former surfer, Tanner set a national indoor 1500 metres record of 3:34.74 in February 2020 to secure the automatic Olympic qualification mark in Staten Island, New York He was confirmed on the New Zealand team for the delayed 2020 Tokyo Olympics in April 2021. At the Games, he failed to make it beyond the heats with a time of 3:43.22.

In June 2022, Tanner won the Oceania Athletics Championships 1500m title. The following month, he was eliminated in the semi-finals of the event at the World Championships held in Eugene, Oregon with a time of 3:36.32. In August, he finished sixth in the Birmingham Commonwealth Games men's 1500m final, setting a new personal best of 3:31.34, an improvement of 3 seconds, and becoming the second-fastest New Zealander of all time over the distance behind Nick Willis.

On 28 January 2023, Tanner lowered his personal best time for the mile by 0.41s to record 3:54.56 in regaining the New Zealand national title at the Cook's Classic in Whanganui. He improved his mile best time twice in the following two weeks with 3:52.85 and then 3:51.70, both indoors in the United States.

Selected for the 1500m at the 2023 World Athletics Championships, he reached the semi-finals.

In January 2024, Tanner retained the New Zealand national title in the mile at the Cook's Classic in Whanganui.

In 2024, he was selected to compete for New Zealand at the 2024 Summer Olympics in the 1500m race. Tanner finished 13th in heat 3 with a time of 3:39.87, then 13th in heat 2 of the repecharge (3:40.71), failing to qualify for the semi-finals.

On 9 March 2025 Tanner retained the New Zealand national senior men's 1500m title at Dunedin's Caledonian Ground, finishing first in a dead heat with Sam Ruthe in a time of 3:44.31. In September 2025, he competed at the 2025 World Championships in Tokyo, Japan, without advancing to the semi-finals.

In January 2026, Tanner lowered his 800 metres personal best to 1:45.94 at the Potts Classic in Hastings. That year, he joined On Athletics Club Oceania under Head Coach Craig Mottram. He was a finalist in the mile at the 2026 Commonwealth Games in Glasgow, Scotland.

== Personal bests ==
- 800 metres – 1:45.94 (Hastings 2026)
- 1500 metres – 3:31.24 (Chorzów 2023)
  - 1500 metres indoor – 3:34.72 (New York City 2021) NR
- One mile – 3:49.51 (Eugene 2023)
  - One mile indoor – 3:51.70 (New York City 2023)
- 3000 metres – 7:50.26 (Wellington 2024)
- 5000 metres – 13:32.74 (Auckland 2022)
- 10,000 metres – 31:26.86 (Wellington 2018)
