= Craig Barrett (race walker) =

New Zealand racewalker (born 1971)

Medal record

Men's athletics

Representing New Zealand

Commonwealth Games
Silver medal – second place	2002 Manchester	50 km walk

Craig Michael Barrett (born 16 November 1971, in Ōpunake) is a New Zealand athlete specialising in racewalking. He was the dominant racewalker in New Zealand for many years and is the nation's record holder for the 3 km, 20 km, 30 km, 50 km and 2-hour disciplines. He attended the Olympic Games in Atlanta (1996), Sydney (2000) and Athens (2004). He won a silver medal in the 50 km walk at the 2002 Commonwealth Games in Manchester.

During the 1998 Commonwealth Games, Barrett collapsed within one kilometre of the finish line whilst leading the 50 km walk, reportedly as a result of dehydration.

== Personal bests ==
Distance	Time	Place	Date
3000 m walk	11:21.50 NR	Wanganui	1997
5000 m walk	19:34.10	Auckland	1996
20,000 m walk	1:25:53.8 NR	North Shore	1998
20 km walk	1:22:20 NR	Adelaide	1998
30,000 m walk	2:09:20.4 NR	North Shore	1998
Marathon walk	3:08:44 NR	New Plymouth	1999
50,000 m walk	3:52:35.55 NR	Christchurch	2002
50 km walk	3:48:05 NR	New Plymouth	2001
2-hour walk	27820 m NR	North Shore	1998

== 50 km walk results ==
  - 1995 IAAF World Championships 22nd
  - 1996 Olympic Games 33rd
  - 1997 IAAF World Championships 13th
  - 1998 Commonwealth Games DNF
  - 1999 IAAF World Championships 7th
  - 2000 Olympic Games 18th
  - 2001 IAAF World Championships DNF
  - 2002 Commonwealth Games 2nd
  - 2003 IAAF World Championships DSQ
  - 2004 Olympic Games 29th
  - 2005 IAAF World Championships DSQ
  - 2006 Commonwealth Games 4th
