= Quentin Rew =

New Zealand racewalker

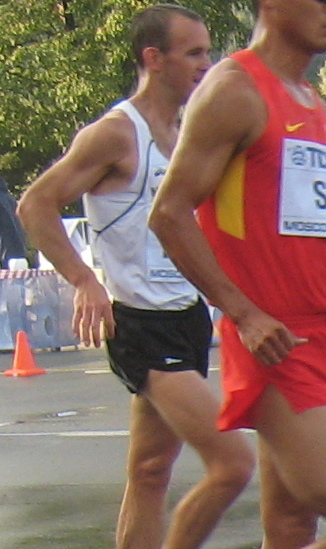
- Rew at 50 km walk race in 2013 World Championships

Personal information
- Born: 16 July 1984 (age 42) Wellington, New Zealand
- Height: 1.75 m (5 ft 9 in)
- Weight: 60 kg (132 lb)

Sport
- Country: New Zealand
- Sport: Athletics
- Event: 50 km race walk

Quentin Rew (born 16 July 1984) is a race walker from New Zealand. At the 2011 World Athletics Championships Rew finished 24th in the 50 kilometres race walk. He represented New Zealand in the 50 km race walk at the 2012 Summer Olympics, originally finishing 30th. With the subsequent ban for a doping offence of Igor Yerokhin (who finished fifth) Rew's placing would be raised to 29th. At the 2015 World Championships in Athletics Rew finished 10th in the 50 kilometres walk in 3:48:48. At the XXI Gold Coast Commonwealth Games, Rew finished 5th in the Men's 20 kilometres walk, with a time of 1:21:47. In 2021, Rew finished 16th in the men's 50 kilometres walk at the 2020 Summer Olympics with a time of 3:57:33.
