= Valerie Adams =

New Zealand shot putter (born 1984)

Dame Valerie Adams DNZM
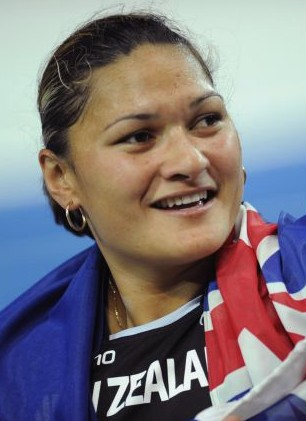
- Adams after her victory at the 2009 World Championships

Personal information
- Born: Valerie Kasanita Adams; 6 October 1984 (age 42) Rotorua, New Zealand
- Height: 193 cm (6 ft 4 in)
- Weight: 120 kg (265 lb) (2012)

Sport
- Country: New Zealand
- Sport: Athletics
- Event: Shot put
- Coached by: Kirsten Hellier (1998–2010); Jean-Pierre Egger (2010–present)

Achievements and titles
- Personal bests: Outdoor: 21.24 m (2011); Indoor: 20.98 m (2013)
Medal record
Event	1st	2nd	3rd
Olympic Games	2	1	1
World Championships	4	1	0
World Indoor Championships	4	0	1
Commonwealth Games	3	2	0
Continental Cup	2	0	0
Total	15	4	2
Olympic Games
Gold medal – first place	2008 Beijing	Shot put
Gold medal – first place	2012 London	Shot put
Silver medal – second place	2016 Rio de Janeiro	Shot put
Bronze medal – third place	2020 Tokyo	Shot put
World Championships
Gold medal – first place	2007 Osaka	Shot put
Gold medal – first place	2009 Berlin	Shot put
Gold medal – first place	2011 Daegu	Shot put
Gold medal – first place	2013 Moscow	Shot put
Silver medal – second place	2005 Helsinki	Shot put
World Indoor Championships
Gold medal – first place	2008 Valencia	Shot put
Gold medal – first place	2010 Doha	Shot put
Gold medal – first place	2012 Istanbul	Shot put
Gold medal – first place	2014 Sopot	Shot put
Bronze medal – third place	2016 Portland	Shot put
Commonwealth Games
Gold medal – first place	2006 Melbourne	Shot put
Gold medal – first place	2010 Delhi	Shot put
Gold medal – first place	2014 Glasgow	Shot put
Silver medal – second place	2002 Manchester	Shot put
Silver medal – second place	2018 Gold Coast	Shot put
World Cup / Continental Cup
Gold medal – first place	2006 Athens	Shot put
Gold medal – first place	2010 Split	Shot put
World Junior Championships
Gold medal – first place	2002 Kingston	Shot put
World Youth Championships
Gold medal – first place	2001 Debrecen	Shot put

Dame Valerie Kasanita Adams DNZM (formerly Vili; born 6 October 1984) is a New Zealand retired shot putter. She is a four-time World champion, four-time World Indoor champion, two-time Olympic, three-time Commonwealth Games champion and twice IAAF Continental Cup winner. She has a personal best throw of 21.24 metres (69.7 ft) outdoors and 20.98 metres (68.8 ft) indoors. These marks are Oceanian, Commonwealth and New Zealand national records. She also holds the Oceanian junior record (18.93 m) and the Oceanian youth record (17.54 m), as well as the World Championships record, World Indoor Championships record and Commonwealth Games record.

Adams was the third woman to win world championships at the youth, junior, and senior level of an athletics event, following the feats of Yelena Isinbayeva and Jana Pittman. She was the first woman to win four consecutive individual titles at the IAAF World Championships. Adams had a winning streak that extended to 56 wins at elite-level competitions, which started in August 2010 and ended in July 2015. She was the IAAF World Athlete of the Year in 2014 and the Track & Field News Athlete of the Year in 2012 and 2013. She had the longest shot put performance of the season every year from 2006 to 2014, bar 2008 when she was second to Natallia Mikhnevich (later banned for doping that year).

Adams won silver medals at the 2012 Summer Olympics (amended to a gold after prior winner Nadzeya Astapchuk was disqualified for doping), 2016 Summer Olympics, 2005 World Championships in Athletics, and the Commonwealth Games in 2002 and 2018. She was also a bronze medallist at the 2016 IAAF World Indoor Championships. While still a teenager, Adams was a finalist at the 2003 World Championships in Athletics and the 2004 Summer Olympics. Adams is one of eleven athletes (along with Usain Bolt, Veronica Campbell-Brown, Armand Duplantis, Jacques Freitag, Yelena Isinbayeva, Kirani James, Faith Kipyegon, Jana Pittman, Dani Samuels, and David Storl) to win world championships at the youth, junior, and senior level of an athletic event.

At national level, she has won fifteen shot put titles at the New Zealand Athletics Championships between 2001 and 2018, as well as having a hammer throw national title in 2003. Adams also won four times at the Australian Athletics Championships between 2004 and 2008. From 2006 to 2012 she was chosen as the New Zealand Sportswoman of the Year seven times consecutively and has been awarded the Lonsdale Cup on five occasions in recognition as the leading national athlete in an Olympic sport.

Adams retired from athletics competition in 2022. In that year she was appointed to the board of High Performance Sport New Zealand, and was the subject of the documentary Dame Valerie Adams: More than Gold.

== Career ==
=== Early career ===
Before taking up athletics at 14, Adams played basketball, rugby, and volleyball. In 1998 she met former javelin thrower Kirsten Hellier, who would become her coach for the next 11 years. Adams first came to prominence when winning the World Youth Championships in 2001, with a throw of 16.87 m. She followed this up in 2002 by becoming World Junior champion, throwing 17.73 m, and gained her first international senior placing with the silver medal at the Commonwealth Games, throwing 17.45 m.

She finished fifth at the 2003 World Championships at eighteen years of age. At her first Olympics in 2004, Adams finished seventh (after two athletes' subsequent disqualification), while still recovering from an appendectomy she had just weeks before the competition.

The following year Adams finished third at the World Championships with a personal best throw of 19.87 m. When the original winner, Nadzeya Astapchuk, was disqualified following a 2013 retest of her drug sample from the competition that was found to be positive, Adams' original bronze medal was upgraded to silver. Adams originally finished second at the World Athletics Final in 2005, but was promoted to gold after Astapchuk's results were annulled. At the 2006 Commonwealth Games Adams won the gold medal, breaking the 20-year-old Commonwealth Games record of 19.00 m with a throw of 19.66 m.

=== First world and Olympic titles ===
In 2007, Adams went to the Osaka World Championships as a favourite to take a medal due to her being one of only three women to throw over 20 m before the championships. In qualifying, Adams led the field with a throw of 19.45 m. Adams held second place behind Nadzeya Astapchuk throughout the final, but responded well in the last round with a mammoth throw and Commonwealth record of 20.54 m to take the gold. This made Adams one of few female athletes ever to take IAAF World Titles at youth, junior and senior level.

In 2008 Adams broke the Oceania record in winning her first World Indoor Title in Valencia (20.19 m). At the Beijing Olympics, she qualified for the final with the longest distance thrown, 19.73 metres, on her first attempt. She won the gold with a throw of 20.56 m, a personal best, beating Belarusian thrower Natallia Mikhnevich. It was the first Olympic gold medal in track and field for New Zealand since John Walker won the 1500 metre race in 1976. She also won the New Zealand Sports Award of the year in 2008.

At the 2009 Grande Prêmio Rio in Brazil Adams won the competition with a new personal best and Oceanian area record of 20.69 m. The throw was also the world leading distance for the event. In August, Adams won at the 2009 World Championships in Athletics in Berlin with a throw of 20.44 metres, ahead of the German Nadine Kleinert and Gong Lijiao of China.

At the 2010 IAAF World Indoor Championships Adams was defeated by Nadzeya Astapchuk by a large margin, in spite of the New Zealander setting a continental record of 20.49 m. Adams announced on 28 March 2010 that she would no longer be coached by Kirsten Hellier after an 11-year partnership. In April 2010 she announced her new coach was Didier Poppe.

Adams was consistently beaten by Nadzeya Astapchuk in the big meetings that season. She set a meeting record and season's best of 20.37 m at the Athletics Bridge meet in Slovakia, later saying that a change in her technique that April had begun to pay dividends.

Later that season she won at the 2010 IAAF Continental Cup with a season's best mark of 20.85 m and also competed at the Commonwealth Games in New Delhi, where she set a Games record mark of 20.47 m to retain her title. In late 2010 Jean-Pierre Egger took over as her coach from Poppe.

=== World and Olympic repeat ===
Adams won the 2011 World Championships equalling the championship record 21.24 met by Natalya Lisovskaya in 1987. At the 2012 World Indoor Championships Adams won the competition with a throw of 20.54 m, a new indoors personal best.

Adams originally won the silver medal at the 2012 London Olympics but was promoted to the gold medal after the initial Olympic champion, Nadzeya Astapchuk, failed two drug tests, one a day before the event and the second on the day of the event.

The Belarusian Ostapchuk tested positive for metenolone which is classified as an anabolic agent on the list of banned substances. Adams later recounted how she initially believed Chef de Mission Dave Currie was "telling fibs" upon being told the news. She received the gold medal from the New Zealand Governor-General, Sir Jerry Mateparae, at a special ceremony in Auckland on 19 September 2012.

=== Fourth world title ===
Adams won her fourth world championship gold at the 2013 World Championships games in Moscow in August 2013. Her fourth gold medal surpassed Astrid Kumbernuss for most all time by a female shotputter and made her the first woman to win four straight titles in an event at the competition. On 27 September, Adams underwent surgery on her left ankle and right knee, and in March 2014 won her third world indoor championship at Sopot in Poland with a distance of 20.67 m. Her gold medal at the 2014 Commonwealth Games, where she was New Zealand's flag-bearer, was her 54th consecutive event win; the streak began in August 2010.

=== Later career ===
Injury caused Adams to withdraw from an attempted defence of her shot put title at the 2014 IAAF Continental Cup and she was ruled out for most of 2015 season for the same reason. During this period she underwent surgeries on her shoulder and elbow in late 2014 and returned for a further operational on her knee in August 2015.

Adams finished second in shot put at the 2016 Summer Olympics with a distance of 20.42 m. She was beaten by Michelle Carter who had a personal best of 20.63 m with her last put of the competition.

In the 2017 New Year Honours, Adams was named a Dame Companion of the New Zealand Order of Merit. She skipped the entire track and field that season due to pregnancy.

Adams came in second in the shot put at the 2018 Commonwealth Games on the Gold Coast, Australia, with a seasonal best put of 18.70 m.

Adams won her fourth Olympic medal in July 2021, at the 2020 Tokyo Olympics, winning a bronze medal with a best put of 19.62 metres (64.4 ft).

Adams announced her retirement from athletics competition on 1 March 2022, but will continue to coach Lisa Adams. In October 2022, the documentary film Dame Valerie Adams: More than Gold was released in New Zealand cinemas, depicting Adams' childhood, sporting career and the lead-up to the 2020 Summer Olympics.

== Sports administration ==
In 2022 Adams was appointed to the board of High Performance Sport New Zealand. As at 2023 Adams is serving her third term on the World Athletics Athletes' Commission. In 2019 she was elected deputy chair of the Commission and in 2023 was elected chairperson. She is also serving as chairperson of the Oceania Athletics Athletes' Commission.

== Personal life ==
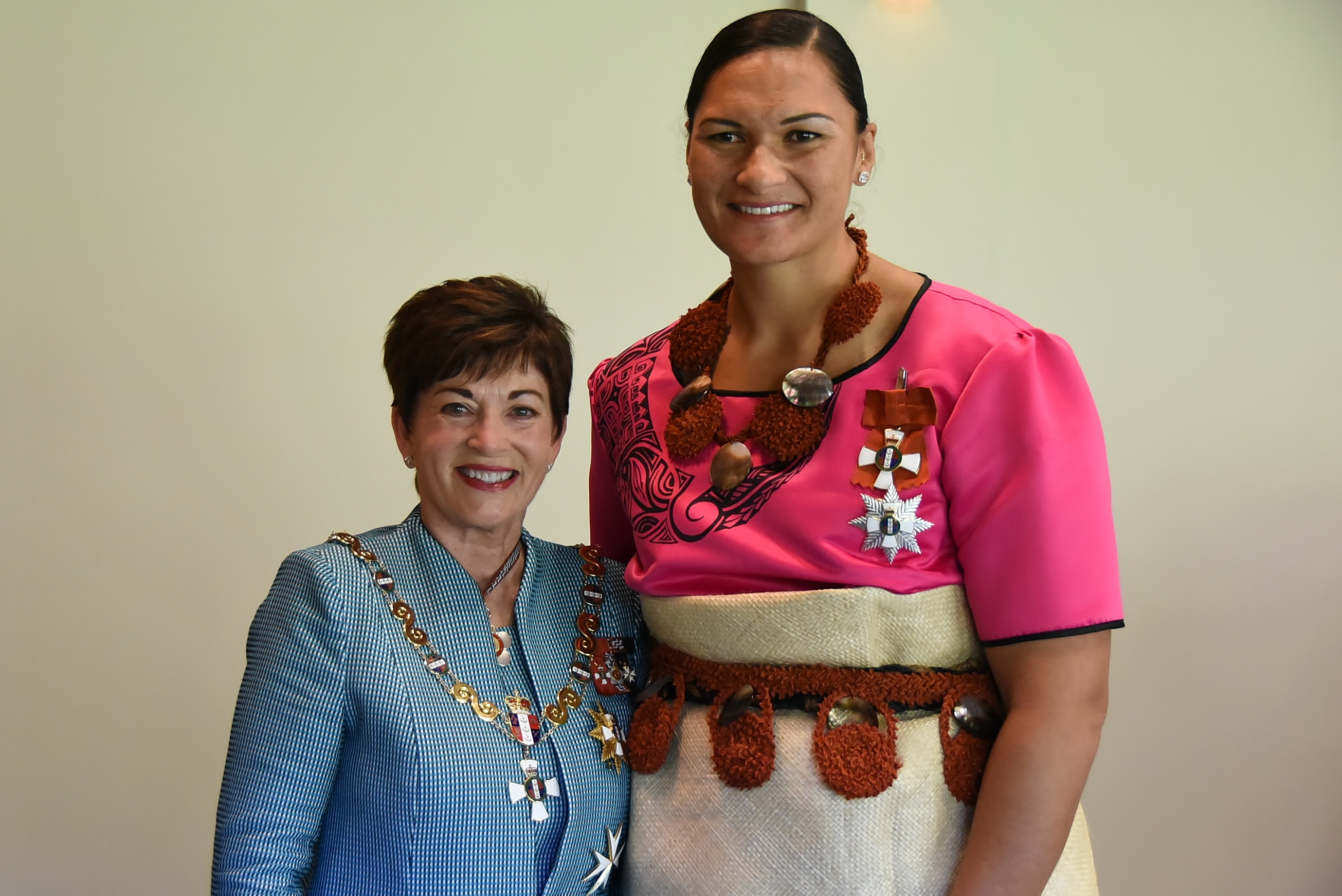
Adams (right) in 2017, after her investiture as a Dame Companion of the New Zealand Order of Merit by the Governor-General, Dame Patsy Reddy

Adams was born in Rotorua, New Zealand, to a Tongan mother (Lilika Ngauamo) and an English father (Sydney Adams). Her father, who settled in New Zealand after service in the Royal Navy, had a total of eighteen children with five women. She inherited her height from her father, who measures 2.10 metres or 6 feet 11 inches, while her mother was only (1.55 metres or 5 feet 1 inch). Adams' youngest sibling is National Basketball Association player Steven Adams, and her two other brothers played professional basketball in New Zealand. Their sister, Lisa Adams, is a retired paralympic champion shot-putter and discus thrower who has cerebral palsy.

Adams was married to Bertrand Vili, a discus thrower from New Caledonia. They used French as their main language and married in 2004 and divorced in early 2010. Adams married Gabriel Price, a friend since childhood, at Temple View in Hamilton on 2 April 2016. The couple have two children: a daughter born in 2017 and a son. In 2023, Adams announced her separation from Price after nearly seven years of marriage.

She is a member of the Church of Jesus Christ of Latter-day Saints.

== Personal bests ==
Event	Mark	Date	Location	Notes
Shot put outdoor	21.24 m	29 August 2011	Daegu, South Korea	AR NR
Shot put indoor	20.98 m	28 August 2013	Zürich, Switzerland	AR NR
Discus throw	58.12 m	31 March 2004	Wanganui, New Zealand	
Hammer throw	58.32 m	6 April 2002	Auckland, New Zealand	

== Seasonal bests ==
Season	Outdoor	Rank	Indoor
2020	18.81	4th	
2019	—	—	
2018	19.31	7th	
2017	—	—	
2016	20.42	3rd	19.25
2015	18.79	13th	
2014	20.59	1st	20.67
2013	20.90	1st	20.98
2012	21.11	1st	20.81
2011	21.24	1st	20.51
2010	20.86	1st	20.49
2009	21.07	1st	
2008	20.56	2nd	20.19
2007	20.54	1st	
2006	20.20	1st	
2005	19.87	3rd	
2004	19.29	8th	18.22
2003	18.93	14th	
2002	18.40	20th	
2001	17.08	68th	
2000	15.72	—	
1999	14.15	—	

== International competitions ==
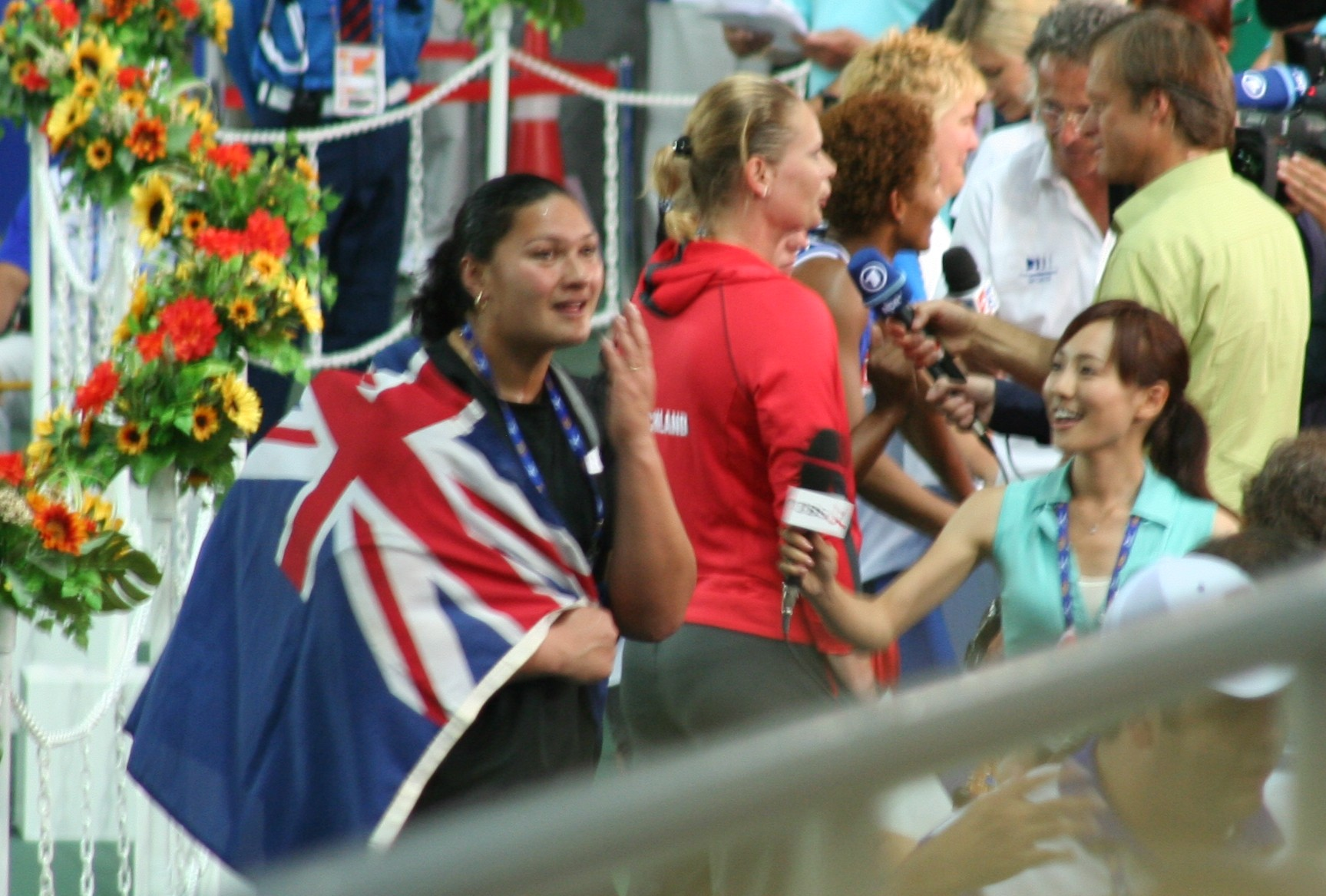
Adams celebrated her first world title in 2007

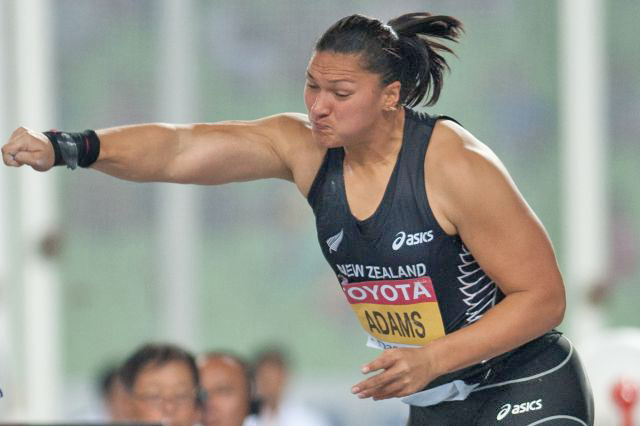
Adams competing at the 2011 World Championships

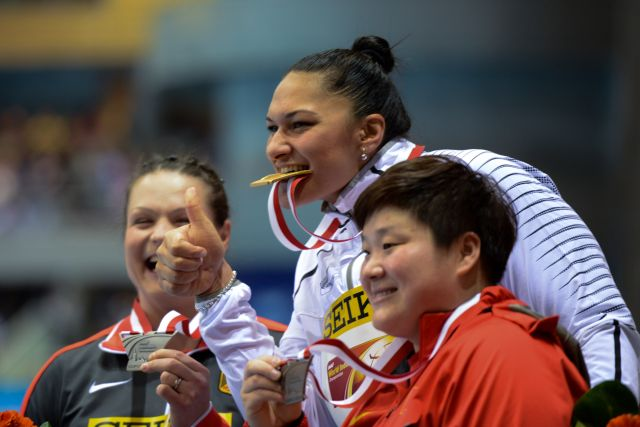
Adams atop the podium at the 2014 World Indoor Championships

Year	Competition	Venue	Position	Notes
2001	World Youth Championships	Debrecen, Hungary	1st	16.87 m
2002	World Junior Championships	Kingston, Jamaica	1st	17.73 m
2002	Commonwealth Games	Manchester, United Kingdom	2nd	17.45 m
2002	World Cup	Madrid, Spain	6th	18.40 m
2003	World Championships	Paris, France	5th	18.65 m
2004	Olympic Games	Athens, Greece	7th	18.56 m
2005	World Championships	Helsinki, Finland	2nd	19.62 m
2006	Commonwealth Games	Melbourne, Australia	1st	19.66 m GR
2006	World Cup	Athens, Greece	1st	19.87 m
2007	World Championships	Osaka, Japan	1st	20.54 m
2008	World Indoor Championships	Valencia, Spain	1st	20.19 m
2008	Olympic Games	Beijing, China	1st	20.56 m
2009	World Championships	Berlin, Germany	1st	20.44 m
2010	World Indoor Championships	Doha, Qatar	1st	20.49 m
2010	Commonwealth Games	New Delhi, India	1st	20.47 m GR
2010	Continental Cup	Split, Croatia	1st	20.86 m
2011	World Championships	Daegu, South Korea	1st	21.24 m CR
2012	World Indoor Championships	Istanbul, Turkey	1st	20.54 m
2012	Olympic Games	London, United Kingdom	1st	20.70 m
2013	World Championships	Moscow, Russia	1st	20.88 m
2014	World Indoor Championships	Sopot, Poland	1st	20.67 m CR
2014	Commonwealth Games	Glasgow, United Kingdom	1st	19.88 m
2016	World Indoor Championships	Portland, United States	3rd	19.25 m
2016	Olympic Games	Rio de Janeiro, Brazil	2nd	20.42 m
2018	Commonwealth Games	Gold Coast, Australia	2nd	18.70 m
2021	Olympic Games	Tokyo, Japan	3rd	19.62 m

Revised positions

- 2004 Olympic Games: Promoted to seventh following disqualification of winner Irina Korzhanenko and fourth-place Svetlana Krivelyova
- 2005 World Championships: Promoted to silver following disqualification of winner Nadzeya Astapchuk
- 2010 World Indoor Championships: Promoted to gold following disqualification of winner Nadzeya Astapchuk
- 2012 Olympic Games: Promoted to gold following disqualification of winner Nadzeya Astapchuk

== National titles ==
- New Zealand Athletics Championships
  - Shot put: 2001, 2002, 2003, 2004, 2005, 2006, 2007, 2008, 2009, 2010, 2011, 2013, 2014, 2016, 2018
  - Hammer throw: 2003
- Australian Athletics Championships
  - Shot put: 2004, 2005, 2008, 2009

== Circuit wins ==
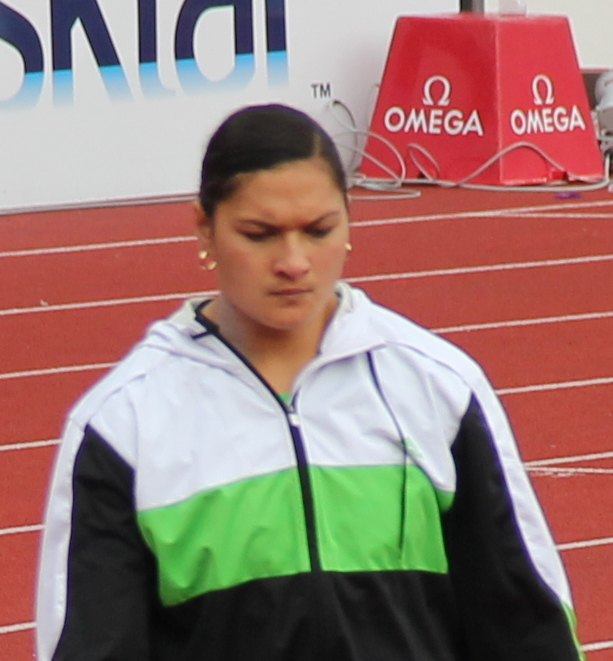
Adams at the Bislett Games in 2011

- IAAF Diamond League: 2010, 2011, 2012, 2013, 2014, 2016
  - Shanghai Golden Grand Prix: 2010
  - Adidas Grand Prix: 2010, 2012, 2014
  - British Grand Prix: 2010, 2012, 2014
  - Meeting Areva: 2010, 2011, 2013
  - Herculis: 2010, 2014, 2016
  - Stockholm Bauhaus Athletics: 2010, 2011, 2012, 2013
  - London Grand Prix: 2010, 2011, 2013
  - Weltklasse Zürich: 2010, 2011, 2012, 2013
  - Bislett Games: 2011
  - Athletissima: 2012, 2014, 2016
  - Golden Gala: 2012, 2014, 2016
  - Prefontaine Classic: 2013
  - Qatar Athletic Super Grand Prix: 2014
  - Memorial Van Damme: 2014
  - Meeting International Mohammed VI d'Athlétisme de Rabat: 2016
- IAAF World Athletics Final: 2005, 2007, 2008, 2009

== Awards ==
- Laureus World Sports Award for Sportswoman of the Year: 2015 nominee
- IAAF World Athlete of the Year: 2014
- Track & Field News Athlete of the Year: 2012, 2013
- New Zealand Listener Power List in Sport: 2008, 2009
- Member of the Order of Queen Sālote Tupou III (31 July 2008).
- New Zealand Order of Merit: 2017
- New Zealand's Sportswoman of the Year: 2006, 2007, 2008, 2009, 2010, 2011, 2012
- Halberg Awards – Supreme Award: 2007, 2008, 2009
- Lonsdale Cup of the New Zealand Olympic Committee: 2006, 2007, 2011, 2013, 2014

== See also ==
- Shot put at the Olympics
- List of Olympic medalists in athletics (women)
- List of 2008 Summer Olympics medal winners
- List of 2012 Summer Olympics medal winners
- List of 2016 Summer Olympics medal winners
- List of New Zealand Olympic medallists
- List of Commonwealth Games medallists in athletics (women)
- List of World Championships in Athletics medalists (women)
- List of Australian athletics champions (women)
- List of New Zealand sportspeople
- List of professional sports families
- List of sporting knights and dames
- Women in New Zealand

Awards
Preceded by Kate McIlroy	New Zealand's Sportswoman of the Year; 2006–2012	Succeeded by Lydia Ko
Preceded by Mahé Drysdale	Halberg Awards – Supreme Award; 2007–2009	Succeeded by All Whites
Preceded by Vivian Cheruiyot	Women's Track & Field Athlete of the Year; 2012–2013	Succeeded by Anita Włodarczyk
Preceded by Shelly-Ann Fraser-Pryce	IAAF World Athlete of the Year; 2014	Succeeded by Genzebe Dibaba
Preceded by 1982 rowing eight Silver Ferns; Hamish Bond and Eric Murray	Lonsdale Cup; 2006–2007; 2011; 2013–2014	Succeeded by Caroline and Georgina Evers-Swindell; Hamish Bond and Eric Murray; Lydia Ko
