= Athletics New Zealand =

National organisation for athletics in New Zealand

- Sport: Athletics
- Jurisdiction: New Zealand
- Abbreviation: ANZ
- Founded: 1887
- Affiliation: World Athletics
- Affiliation date: 1932
- Regional affiliation: OAA
- Headquarters: Auckland
- President: Sharee Jones
- CEO: Cam Mitchell
- Replaced: New Zealand Amateur Athletic Association

Official website
- athletics.org.nz
- Other key staff: Head of Commercial & Brand: Mark Pickering Marketing Manager: Petra van Eeghen Content & Communications Manager: Michael Dawson Commercial Partnerships & Technology Manager: Libby McGee Participation & Membership Admin : Tessa Hunt
- (New Zealand)

Athletics New Zealand (ANZ) is the national governing body for athletics in New Zealand. This includes responsibility for Track and field, cross country running, road running and racewalking.

== History ==
The organisation was founded in 1887 as the New Zealand Amateur Athletic Association (NZAAA). The first national championships were held the following year in 1888. In 1989, the current name was adopted.

== Structure ==
There are 11 regional athletics associations supporting 179 clubs with approximately 22,000 registered members including athletes, coaches and volunteers.

New Zealand Regional Athletics Associations
Athletics Northland Inc	Athletics Northland
Athletics Auckland Inc	www.athleticsauckland.co.nz
Athletics Waikato Bay of Plenty Inc	www.athleticswaikatobayofplenty.org.nz
Athletics Taranaki Inc	www.athleticstaranaki.org.nz
Athletics Hawkes Bay Gisborne Inc	Hawkes Bay Gisborne Athletics
Athletics Manawatu Wanganui Inc	PNAHC Wanganui Athletics
Athletics Wellington Inc	www.athleticswellington.org.nz
Athletics Tasman Inc	athleticsnelson
Athletics Canterbury Inc	www.athleticscanterbury.org.nz
Athletics Otago Inc	www.athleticsotago.co.nz
Athletics Southland Inc	www.athleticssouthland.co.nz

== Affiliations ==
ANZ is the national member federation for New Zealand in the following international organisations:

- World Athletics
- Oceania Athletic Association (OAA)

Athletics New Zealand is part of the following national organisations:

- New Zealand Olympic Committee

== National records ==
ANZ maintains the New Zealand records in athletics.

== See also ==
- Sport in New Zealand
- Sport and Recreation New Zealand
