= Finland at the 2026 European Athletics Championships =

- Flag of Finland
- WA code: FIN
- National federation: Finnish Athletics Federation

in Birmingham, United Kingdom 10–16 August 2026
- Competitors: 72 (31 men and 41 women)
- Medals Ranked 10th: Gold 2 Silver 1 Bronze 0 Total 3

European Athletics Championships appearances
- 1934; 1938; 1946; 1950; 1954; 1958; 1962; 1966; 1969; 1971; 1974; 1978; 1982; 1986; 1990; 1994; 1998; 2002; 2006; 2010; 2012; 2014; 2016; 2018; 2022; 2024; 2026

Finland competed at the 2026 European Athletics Championships in Birmingham, United Kingdom from 10–16 August 2026.

== Medallists ==
Medal	Name	Event	Date
Gold	Silja Kosonen	Women's hammer throw	12 August
Gold	Alisa Vainio	Women's marathon	16 August
Silver	Wilma Heltelä	Women's pole vault	13 August

== Results ==
Finland entered the following athletes.

Key

- Q = Qualified for the next round
- q = Qualified for the next round as a fastest loser or, in field events, by position without achieving the qualifying target
- NR = National record
- PB = Personal best
- SB = Season best
- N/A = Round not applicable for the event

=== Men ===
Track and road events

Athlete	Event	Heat		Semifinal		Final	
Athlete	Event	Result	Rank	Result	Rank	Result	Rank
Riku Illukka	100 m	10.57	4 (Note: Illukka finished with the 13th best time but, due to a withdrawal from one of the top 12 times, Illukka qualified for the semi-finals)	10.36	5	Did not advance	
Riku Illukka	200 m	Bye		20.38 NR	4	Did not advance	
Tuomas Heikkilä	5000 m	—N/a				13:30.64	13
Mustafe Muuse	10,000 m	—N/a				29:17.11 PB	18
Santeri Kuusiniemi	110 m hurdles	13.89	4 q	13.96	7	Did not advance	
Elmo Lakka	110 m hurdles	13.84	4 q	13.89	6	Did not advance	
Ilari Manninen	110 m hurdles	14.13	6	Did not advance			
Jere Haapalainen	400 m hurdles	50.37 SB	8	Did not advance			
Tuomas Lehtonen	400 m hurdles	50.83	6	Did not advance			
Antti Sainio	400 m hurdles	49.70 SB	3 q	50.64	8	Did not advance	
Joni Hava	Half marathon walk	—N/a				1:29:25 PB	16
Jerry Jokinen	Half marathon walk	—N/a				1:26:33 PB	10
Aku Partanen	Half marathon walk	—N/a				1:29:07	14
Valtteri Louko; Riku Illukka; Oskari Lehtonen; Samuel Purola	4 × 100 m relay	DNF		—N/a		Did not advance	

Field events

Athlete	Event	Qualification		Final	
Athlete	Event	Distance	Position	Distance	Position
Daniel Kosonen	High jump	2.15	18	Did not advance	
Juho Alasaari	Pole vault	5.60	8 q	5.55	13
Kristian Pulli	Long jump	NM		Did not advance	
Kalle Salminen	Long jump	7.73	17	Did not advance	
Kasperi Vehmaa	Long jump	7.50	24	Did not advance	
Aaro Davidila	Triple jump	15.68	20	Did not advance	
Mico Lampinen	Discus throw	56.47	24	Did not advance	
Henri Liipola	Hammer throw	71.23	23	Did not advance	
Oliver Helander	Javelin throw	78.43	15	Did not advance	
Topi Parviainen	Javelin throw	78.88	12 q	77.82	8
Eemil Porvari	Javelin throw	75.15	25	Did not advance	

=== Women ===
Track and road events

Athlete	Event	Heat		Semifinal		Final	
Athlete	Event	Result	Rank	Result	Rank	Result	Rank
Lotta Kemppinen	100 m	11.25 SB	9 q	11.29	7	Did not advance	
Eveliina Määttänen	800 m	1:59.62 SB	8	Did not advance			
Nathalie Blomqvist	5000 m	—N/a				15:58.36	18
Aino Suni	5000 m	—N/a				15:54.25	12
Ilona Mononen	10,000 m	—N/a				DNS	
Alisa Vainio	Marathon	—N/a				2:22:26 CR	1st place, gold medalist(s)
Lotta Harala	100 m hurdles	Bye		13.18	8	Did not advance	
Saara Keskitalo	100 m hurdles	Bye		13.09	4	Did not advance	
Heidi Salminen	400 m hurdles	55.93	6 q	56.39	7	Did not advance	
Hilla Uusimäki	400 m hurdles	Bye		54.70	4	Did not advance	
Ilona Mononen	3000 m steeplechase	9:32.55	2 Q	—N/a		9:25.62	8
Alisa Virtanen	3000 m steeplechase	9:57.19	15	—N/a		Did not advance	
Anniina Kivimäki	Half marathon walk	—N/a				1:48:02	29
Enni Nurmi	Half marathon walk	—N/a				1:44:02 PB	27
Heta Veikkola	Half marathon walk	—N/a				DNF	
Saara Keskitalo; Lotta Kemppinen; Tessa Moisio; Nooralotta Neziri	4 × 100 m relay	43.78 SB	7	—N/a		Did not advance	
Heidi Salminen; Hilla Uusimäki; Aino Pulkkinen; Veera Mattila	4 × 400 m relay	3:30.54 SB	7	—N/a		Did not advance	

Field events

Athlete	Event	Qualification		Final	
Athlete	Event	Distance	Position	Distance	Position
Ella Junnila	High jump	1.91	12 Q	1.88	10
Saga Andersson	Pole vault	4.25	16	Did not advance	
Wilma Heltelä	Pole vault	4.50	3 q	4.75	2nd place, silver medalist(s)
Senni Salminen	Triple jump	13.53	21	Did not advance	
Emilia Kangas	Shot put	18.04	8 q	18.20	9
Minttu Laurila	Shot put	15.40	25	Did not advance	
Senja Mäkitörmä	Shot put	17.38	13	Did not advance	
Helena Leveelahti	Discus throw	51.96	27	Did not advance	
Silja Kosonen	Hammer throw	72.02	3 Q	76.28	1st place, gold medalist(s)
Krista Tervo	Hammer throw	70.42	5 q	67.74	11
Jatta-Mari Jääskeläinen	Javelin throw	53.72	25	Did not advance	
Emilia Karell	Javelin throw	54.38	21	Did not advance	
Rebecca Nelimarkka	Javelin throw	53.75	24	Did not advance	
