= Finland at the 2022 European Athletics Championships =

- Flag of Finland
- WA code: FIN
- National federation: Finnish Athletics Federation

in Munich, Germany 15 August 2022 – 21 August 2022
- Competitors: 66 (26 men and 40 women) in 36 events
- Medals Ranked 10th: Gold 2 Silver 1 Bronze 1 Total 4

European Athletics Championships appearances
- 1934; 1938; 1946; 1950; 1954; 1958; 1962; 1966; 1969; 1971; 1974; 1978; 1982; 1986; 1990; 1994; 1998; 2002; 2006; 2010; 2012; 2014; 2016; 2018; 2022; 2024

Finland competed at the 2022 European Athletics Championships in Munich, Germany, between 15 and 21 August 2022.

== Medallists ==
Medal	Name	Event	Date
Gold	Wilma Murto	Women's pole vault	17 August
Gold	Topi Raitanen	Men's 3000 metres steeplechase	19 August
Silver	Kristiina Mäkelä	Women's triple jump	19 August
Bronze	Lassi Etelätalo	Men's javelin throw	21 August

== Results ==
Finland entered the following athletes.

Key

- Q = Qualified for the next round
- q = Qualified for the next round as a fastest loser or, in field events, by position without achieving the qualifying target
- NR = National record
- PB = Personal best
- SB = Season best
- N/A = Round not applicable for the event

=== Men ===
Track and road events

Athlete	Event	Heat		Semifinal		Final	
Athlete	Event	Result	Rank	Result	Rank	Result	Rank
Samuli Samuelsson	100 m	10.39	4	Did not advance			
Samuel Purola	200 m	20.77	4 q	20.83	7	Did not advance	
Joonas Rinne	800 m	1:48.03	5	Did not advance			
Arttu Vattulainen	Marathon	—				DNF	–
Santeri Kuusiniemi	110 m hurdles	13.89	3 Q	13.81	6	Did not advance	
Elmo Lakka	110 m hurdles	13.78	6	Did not advance			
Ilari Manninen	110 m hurdles	14.08	6	Did not advance			
Tuomas Lehtonen	400 m hurdles	52.75	7	Did not advance			
Topi Raitanen	3000 m steeplechase	8:33.51	5 Q	—		8:21.80	1st place, gold medalist(s)
Joni Hava	20 km walk	—				1:25:32	13
Jerry Jokinen	20 km walk	—				1:26:11 PB	17
Jaakko Määttänen	20 km walk	—				1:29:38	24
Aleksi Ojala	35 km walk	—				2:39:06	12
Santeri Örn; Samuli Samuelsson; Oskari Lehtonen; Samuel Purola	4 × 100 m relay	39.37	6	—		Did not advance	

Field events

Athlete	Event	Qualification		Final	
Athlete	Event	Distance	Position	Distance	Position
Juho Alasaari	Pole vault	5.30	=21	Did not advance	
Tommi Holttinen	Pole vault	5.50 SB	=15	Did not advance	
Urho Kujanpää	Pole vault	5.65 SB	12 q	5.50	=9
Kristian Pulli	Long jump	7.70	14	Did not advance	
Simo Lipsanen	Triple jump	15.93	17	Did not advance	
Aaron Kangas	Hammer throw	71.08	18	Did not advance	
Henri Liipola	Hammer throw	71.55	15	Did not advance	
Tuomas Seppänen	Hammer throw	71.24	16	Did not advance	
Lassi Etelätalo	Javelin throw	79.29	3 q	86.44 PB	3rd place, bronze medalist(s)
Toni Keränen	Javelin throw	77.01	13	Did not advance	
Toni Kuusela	Javelin throw	79.26	5 q	80.20	5

=== Women ===
Track and road events

Athlete	Event	Heat		Semifinal		Final	
Athlete	Event	Result	Rank	Result	Rank	Result	Rank
Anniina Kortetmaa	200 m	23.60	5	Did not advance			
Mette Baas	400 m	53.02	5	Did not advance			
Milja Thureson	400 m	53.63	8	Did not advance			
Sara Kuivisto	800 m	2:04.32	3 Q	2:01.59 SB	6	Did not advance	
Eveliina Määttänen	800 m	2:03.66	7	Did not advance			
Nathalie Blomqvist	1500 m	4:14.90	12	—		Did not advance	
Ilona Mononen	5000 m	—				16:10.97	18
Camilla Richardsson	5000 m	—				15:16.71 PB	10
Camilla Richardsson	10,000 m	—				32:19.27 PB	9
Nina Chydenius	Marathon	—				2:43:00	39
Annemari Kiekara	Marathon	—				2:48:30	49
Suvi Miettinen	Marathon	—				2:47:15	46
Alisa Vainio	Marathon	—				DNF	–
Reetta Hurske	100 m hurdles	Bye		12.95	3	Did not advance	
Kristiina Halonen	400 m hurdles	56.70	4 q	56.82	7	Did not advance	
Viivi Lehikoinen	400 m hurdles	Bye		54.50 NR	1 Q	55.58	6
Venla Laiho	20 km walk	—				1:43:47	20
Enni Nurmi	20 km walk	—				1:36:56	15
Elisa Neuvonen	35 km walk	—				2:59:00	10
Johanna Kylmänen; Aino Pulkkinen; Anniina Kortetmaa; Anna Pursiainen	4 × 100 m relay	44.73	7	—		Did not advance	
Milja Thureson; Mette Baas; Aino Pulkkinen; Kristiina Halonen	4 × 400 m relay	3:33.40	8	—		Did not advance	

Field events

Athlete	Event	Qualification		Final	
Athlete	Event	Distance	Position	Distance	Position
Ella Junnila	High jump	1.78	=19	Did not advance	
Sini Lällä	High jump	1.78	23	Did not advance	
Heta Tuuri	High jump	1.83	=15	Did not advance	
Saga Andersson	Pole vault	4.40	13	Did not advance	
Elina Lampela	Pole vault	4.40	12 q	4.40	11
Wilma Murto	Pole vault	4.50	7 q	4.85 NR, =CR	1st place, gold medalist(s)
Kristiina Mäkelä	Triple jump	14.11	5 q	14.64 NR	2nd place, silver medalist(s)
Senni Salminen	Triple jump	13.90	8 q	14.13	7
Senja Mäkitörmä	Shot put	16.94	19	Did not advance	
Eveliina Rouvali	Shot put	17.07	17	Did not advance	
Salla Sipponen	Discus throw	56.47	17	Did not advance	
Sara Killinen	Hammer throw	NM	–	Did not advance	
Silja Kosonen	Hammer throw	68.25	9 q	69.45	5
Krista Tervo	Hammer throw	67.80	11 q	67.85	8
Anni-Linnea Alanen	Javelin throw	52.09	23	Did not advance	
Sanne Erkkola	Javelin throw	54.04	20	Did not advance	

Combined events – Heptathlon

Athlete	Event	100H	HJ	SP	200 m	LJ	JT	800 m	Final	Rank
Saga Vanninen	Result	13.74	1.74	15.08 PB	25.01	5.99	43.95	2:22.76 PB	6045	10
Saga Vanninen	Points	1015	903	866	886	846	743	786	6045	10
