= Finland at the 2024 European Athletics Championships =

- Flag of Finland
- WA code: FIN
- National federation: Finnish Athletics Federation

in Rome, Italy 7 June 2024 – 12 June 2024
- Competitors: 67 (26 men and 41 women) in 35 events
- Medals Ranked 27th: Gold 0 Silver 0 Bronze 1 Total 1

European Athletics Championships appearances
- 1934; 1938; 1946; 1950; 1954; 1958; 1962; 1966; 1969; 1971; 1974; 1978; 1982; 1986; 1990; 1994; 1998; 2002; 2006; 2010; 2012; 2014; 2016; 2018; 2022; 2024

Finland competed at the 2024 European Athletics Championships in Rome, Italy, between 7 and 12 June 2024.

== Medallists ==
Medal	Name	Event	Date
Bronze	Oliver Helander	Men's javelin throw	12 June

== Results ==
Finland entered the following athletes.

Key

- Q = Qualified for the next round
- q = Qualified for the next round as a fastest loser or, in field events, by position without achieving the qualifying target
- NR = National record
- PB = Personal best
- SB = Season best
- N/A = Round not applicable for the event

=== Men ===
Track and road events

Athlete	Event	Heat		Semifinal		Final	
Athlete	Event	Result	Rank	Result	Rank	Result	Rank
Samuli Samuelsson	100 m	Bye		10.59 SB	8	Did not advance	
Viljami Kaasalainen	200 m	DNS	–	Did not advance			
Samuel Purola	200 m	21.04	6	Did not advance			
Mika Kotiranta	10,000 m	—				31:25.10	41
Santeri Kuusiniemi	110 m hurdles	13.84	5 q	13.84	6 qR (Note: Kuusiniemi was obstructed in the semifinal and was thus given a place in the final after a protest.)	13.84	7
Elmo Lakka	110 m hurdles	14.10	7	Did not advance			
Jere Haapalainen	400 m hurdles	52.18	8	Did not advance			
Tuomas Lehtonen	400 m hurdles	50.50 SB	6	Did not advance			
Topi Raitanen	3000 m steeplechase	8:22.42	5 Q	—		8:32.37	15
Jerry Jokinen	20 km walk	—				1:24:41 =PB	22
Aleksi Ojala	20 km walk	—				DQ	–
Aku Partanen	20 km walk	—				1:20:52 SB	5

Field events

Athlete	Event	Qualification		Final	
Athlete	Event	Distance	Position	Distance	Position
Arttu Mattila	High jump	2.12	22	Did not advance	
Juho Alasaari	Pole vault	5.25	24	Did not advance	
Tommi Holttinen	Pole vault	5.45 =SB	18	Did not advance	
Urho Kujanpää	Pole vault	5.45	19	Did not advance	
Kristian Pulli	Long jump	7.90 SB	15	Did not advance	
Kasperi Vehmaa	Long jump	7.63	25	Did not advance	
Aaro Davidila	Triple jump	15.85	23	Did not advance	
Tuomas Kaukolahti	Triple jump	15.79	25	Did not advance	
Simo Lipsanen	Triple jump	16.12	20	Did not advance	
Aaron Kangas	Hammer throw	71.58	26	Did not advance	
Tuomas Seppänen	Hammer throw	72.85	20	Did not advance	
Lassi Etelätalo	Javelin throw	80.83	11 q	82.80 SB	6
Oliver Helander	Javelin throw	84.35	3 Q	85.75 SB	3rd place, bronze medalist(s)
Toni Keränen	Javelin throw	82.77 SB	5 Q	80.76	10

=== Women ===
Track and road events

Athlete	Event	Heat		Semifinal		Final	
Athlete	Event	Result	Rank	Result	Rank	Result	Rank
Lotta Kemppinen	100 m	11.32 PB	5 q	11.44	8	Did not advance	
Anniina Kortetmaa	200 m	23.53 SB	7	Did not advance			
Aino Pulkkinen	200 m	23.44	4	Did not advance			
Mette Baas	400 m	52.94	5	Did not advance			
Eveliina Määttänen	800 m	2:01.59	2 Q	2:01.49	7	Did not advance	
Sara Lappalainen	1500 m	4:07.39 SB	7	—		Did not advance	
Nathalie Blomqvist	5000 m	—				14:44.72 NR	5
Nina Chydenius	10,000 m	—				32:16.85 PB	8
Camilla Richardsson	Half marathon	—				DNF	–
Alisa Vainio	Half marathon	—				1:11:50 SB	27
Lotta Harala	100 m hurdles	12.91	1 q	12.98	6	Did not advance	
Reetta Hurske	100 m hurdles	Bye		12.78 SB	3 q	12.84	6
Kristiina Halonen	400 m hurdles	55.62 PB	3 q	55.83	7	Did not advance	
Viivi Lehikoinen	400 m hurdles	Bye		54.92 SB	4	Did not advance	
Hilla Uusimäki	400 m hurdles	56.40	3	Did not advance			
Ilona Mononen	3000 m steeplechase	9:31.08 PB	3 Q	—		9:23.28 NR	6
Petra Häggqvist; Anna Pursiainen; Anniina Kortetmaa; Lotta Kemppinen	4 × 100 m relay	43.68 SB	6	—		Did not advance	
Milja Thureson; Aino Pulkkinen; Katriina Wright; Mette Baas	4 × 400 m relay	3:26.51 SB	5	—		Did not advance	

Field events

Athlete	Event	Qualification		Final	
Athlete	Event	Distance	Position	Distance	Position
Ella Junnila	High jump	1.92 SB	1 Q	1.93 SB	5
Heta Tuuri	High jump	1.85	18	Did not advance	
Saga Andersson	Pole vault	4.10	24	Did not advance	
Silja Andersson	Pole vault	NM	–	Did not advance	
Elina Lampela	Pole vault	4.50	6 q	4.58	4
Wilma Murto	Pole vault	4.50	1 q	4.43	8
Jessica Kähärä	Long jump	6.39	23	Did not advance	
Jessica Kähärä	Triple jump	13.21	24	Did not advance	
Kristiina Mäkelä	Triple jump	13.74	14	Did not advance	
Senni Salminen	Triple jump	13.54	21	Did not advance	
Emilia Kangas	Shot put	17.02	12 q	16.74	12
Senja Mäkitörmä	Shot put	16.45	17	Did not advance	
Eveliina Rouvali	Shot put	16.34	18	Did not advance	
Helena Leveelahti	Discus throw	55.22	24	Did not advance	
Salla Sipponen	Discus throw	54.92 =SB	25	Did not advance	
Suvi Koskinen	Hammer throw	62.72	28	Did not advance	
Silja Kosonen	Hammer throw	70.94	6 q	72.06	4
Krista Tervo	Hammer throw	66.16	23	Did not advance	
Anni-Linnea Alanen	Javelin throw	53.03	21	Did not advance	
Sanna Erkkola	Javelin throw	51.36	29	Did not advance	
Jatta-Mari Jääskeläinen	Javelin throw	52.50	27	Did not advance	

Combined events – Heptathlon

Athlete	Event	100H	HJ	SP	200 m	LJ	JT	800 m	Final	Rank
Saga Vanninen	Result	13.60	1.68	DNS	DNF					
Saga Vanninen	Points	1036	830	DNS	DNF					
