= Finland at the 2018 European Athletics Championships =

- WA code: FIN
- National federation: SUL
- Website: www.sul.fi

in Berlin
- Competitors: 41
- Medals: Gold 0 Silver 0 Bronze 0 Total 0

European Athletics Championships appearances
- 1934; 1938; 1946; 1950; 1954; 1958; 1962; 1966; 1969; 1971; 1974; 1978; 1982; 1986; 1990; 1994; 1998; 2002; 2006; 2010; 2012; 2014; 2016; 2018; 2022; 2024; 2026

Finland competed at the 2018 European Athletics Championships in Berlin, Germany, from 6–12 August 2018. A delegation of 41 athletes were sent to represent the country.

The following athletes were selected to compete by the Finnish Amateur Athletic Association.

== Results ==
Finland was left without a medal at the European Championships for the second time, the first time was in 1966.

=== Men ===
Track & road events

Athletes	Event	Heats		Semifinal		Final	
Athletes	Event	Result	Rank	Result	Rank	Result	Rank
Oskari Lehtonen	200 metres	21.06	19	Did not advance			
Arttu Vattulainen	10,000 metres	—N/a				29:12.02	18
Elmo Lakka	110 metres hurdles	13.75	12 q	13.60	17 PB	Did not advance	
Topi Raitanen	3000 metres steeplechase	8:28.48 PB	2 Q	—N/a		8:40.11	8
Otto Ahlfors; ~~Viljami Kaasalainen~~; Oskari Lehtonen; ~~Ville Myllymäki~~; Samuel Purola; Eetu Rantala	4 × 100 metres relay	39.11 NR	8 Q	—N/a		38.92 NR	6
Jarkko Kinnunen	50 km walk	—N/a				4:24:59	26
Aleksi Ojala	50 km walk	—N/a				DNF	
Veli-Matti Partanen	50 km walk	—N/a				DNF	

Field events

Athletes	Event	Qualification		Final	
Athletes	Event	Distance	Position	Distance	Position
Tommi Holttinen	Pole vault	5.51 PB	13	Did not advance	
Urho Kujanpää	Pole vault	5.36	17	Did not advance	
Tomas Wecksten	Pole vault	5.36	17	Did not advance	
Kristian Bäck	Long jump	7.61	20	Did not advance	
Kristian Pulli	Long jump	7.68	16	Did not advance	
Simo Lipsanen	Triple jump	16.51	10 q	16.46	9
Arttu Kangas	Shot put	18.17	28	Did not advance	
Oliver Helander	Javelin throw	76.64	16	Did not advance	
Antti Ruuskanen	Javelin throw	79.93	12 q	81.70	6
Henri Liipola	Hammer throw	71.34	20	Did not advance	
David Söderberg	Hammer throw	69.18	28	Did not advance	

Combined events – Decathlon

Athlete	Event	100 m	LJ	SP	HJ	400 m	110H	DT	PV	JT	1500 m	Final	Rank
Elmo Savola	Result	11.05	6.93	13.41	1.99	49.54	14.87	42.92	4.80	57.12	5:01.22	7655	15
Elmo Savola	Points	850	797	692	794	836	865	724	849	695	553	7655	15

=== Women ===
Track & road events

Athletes	Event	Heats		Semifinal		Final	
Athletes	Event	Result	Rank	Result	Rank	Result	Rank
Sara Kuivisto	800 metres	2:02.62	17	Did not advance			
Sara Kuivisto	1500 metres	4:11.39	17	—N/a		Did not advance	
Reetta Hurske	100 metres hurdles	13.21	9 Q	13.20	18	Did not advance	
Annimari Korte	100 metres hurdles	13.31	15	Did not advance			
Nooralotta Neziri	100 metres hurdles	Bye		12.94	8	Did not advance	
Viivi Lehikoinen	400 metres hurdles	58.43	17	Did not advance			
Janica Rauma	3000 metres steeplechase	9:41.70	19 PB	—N/a		Did not advance	
Elisa Neuvonen	20 km walk	—N/a				1:37:12	23
Tiia Kuikka	50 km walk	—N/a				4:35:56	13

Field events

Athletes	Event	Qualification		Final	
Athletes	Event	Distance	Position	Distance	Position
Ella Junnila	High jump	1.86	17	Did not advance	
Wilma Murto	Pole vault	4.35	17	Did not advance	
Minna Nikkanen	Pole vault	4.35 =SB	13	Did not advance	
Kristiina Mäkelä	Triple jump	14.24	8 Q	14.01	9
Senja Mäkitörmä	Shot put	16.04	20	Did not advance	
Sanna Kämäräinen	Discus throw	54.76	19	Did not advance	
Helena Leveelahti	Discus throw	53.56	24	Did not advance	
Salla Sipponen	Discus throw	54.00	21	Did not advance	
Jenni Kangas	Javelin throw	59.96 SB	8	54.92	12
Inga Linna	Hammer throw	65.46	20	Did not advance	
Krista Tervo	Hammer throw	65.37	21	Did not advance	

Combined events – Heptathlon

Athlete	Event	100H	HJ	SP	200 m	LJ	JT	800 m	Final	Rank
Maria Huntington	Result	13.61	1.79	12.14	25.01	5.66	41.72	2:27.25	5731	19
Maria Huntington	Points	1034	966	670	886	747	700	728	5731	19
