= 2014 Finland–Sweden Athletics International =

2014 athletics competition

- Venue: Olympic Stadium
- Location: Helsinki, Finland
- Start date: August 30, 2014
- End date: August 31, 2014
- Nations: 2
- Teams: Finland, Sweden

2014 Finland–Sweden Athletics International is the 74th edition of Finland–Sweden Athletics International competition between Sweden and Finland. It was held 30–31 August 2014 in the Helsinki Olympic Stadium in Helsinki, Finland. The women's pole vault was exceptionally competed on 29 August at the Narinkkatori square in downtown Helsinki. Sweden won both the men's and women's events, while Finland won the smaller boy's, girl's and walking events.

At the meeting, Fredrik Uhrbom's 5000 m performance was anticipated following his collapse in the 10,000 m at the 2013 Finnkampen, which received significant media attention. Uhrbom thought that the Swedish men could defend their title. Sportscaster Kaj Kunnas was removed from the 2014 broadcast following over 100 complaints that he was too biased in his 2013 coverage.

In the women's competition, Finland led by four points ahead of the closing 1500 metres event. Sweden's Emma Green faltered to finish only 3rd, but Lovisa Lindh reportedly made up for the error to give Sweden the team title.

== Results ==
Points given in each event are, from 1st to 6th place: 7-5-4-3-2-1, in relays 1st and 2nd place are awarded with 5 and 2 points.

Points:

	Men	Women
Finland	193	204
Sweden	216	206

=== Men ===
Finland's points are shown first

Event / Points	Winner	Second place	Third place	Fourth place	Fifth place	Sixth place
100 metres	(Sweden) Tom Kling-Baptiste	(Sweden) Odain Rose	(Finland) Eetu Rantala	(Finland) Ville Myllymäki	(Sweden) Nil de Oliveira	(Finland) Samuli Samuelsson
8 – 14	10.49	10.51	10.57	10.58	10.59	10.64
200 metres	(Sweden) Nil de Oliveira	(Sweden) Johan Wissman	(Sweden) Joel Groth	(Finland) Samuli Samuelsson	(Finland) Eetu Rantala	(Finland) Jonathan Åstrand
6 – 16	21.24	21.30	21.52	21.66	21.72	22.23
400 metres	(Sweden) Johan Wissman	(Sweden) Axel Bergrahm	(Finland) Oskari Mörö	(Sweden) Dennis Forsman	(Finland) Jani Koskela	(Finland) Antti Kokkonen
7 – 15	47.09	47.14	47.40	47.77	48.12	48.43
800 metres	(Sweden) Johan Rogestedt	(Sweden) Andreas Almgren	(Finland) Ville Lampinen	(Sweden) Rickard Gunnarsson	(Finland) Tuomo Salonen	(Finland) Panu Jantunen
7 – 15	1.47.70	1.48.12	1.48.86	1.49.08	1.51.00	1.51.66
1500 metres	(Sweden) Johan Rogestedt	(Sweden) Jonas Leandersson	(Sweden) Johan Walldén	(Finland) Riku Marttinen	(Finland) Ossi Kekki	(Finland) Ilari Piipponen
6 – 16	3.41.27	3.43.77	3.44.76	3.47.06	3.47.80	3.52.37
5000 metres	(Sweden) Staffan Ek	(Finland) Ossi Kekki	(Sweden) Fredrik Uhrbom	(Finland) Jaakko Nieminen	(Finland) Tuomas Jokinen	(Sweden) Daniel Lundgren
10 – 11	14.24.27	14.26.36	14.28.63	14.30.76	14.50.54	DQ
10000 metres	(Sweden) Mustafa Mohamed	(Finland) Arttu Vattulainen	(Sweden) Lars Södergård	(Finland) Henri Manninen	(Sweden) Johan Larsson	(Finland) Anders Lindahl
9 – 13	29.38.73	29.40.86	29.44.86	29.47.12	30.13.37	30.43.19
110 metre hurdles	(Sweden) Fredrick Ekholm	(Finland) Arttu Hirvonen	(Finland) Elmo Lakka	(Finland) Joona-Ville Heinä	(Sweden) Marvin Tay	(Sweden) Alexander Brorsson
12 – 10	14.09	14.21	14.25	14.27	14.31	15.12
400 metre hurdles	(Finland) Oskari Mörö	(Finland) Eetu Viitala	(Sweden) Petter Olson	(Finland) Petteri Monni	(Sweden) Jonathan Carbe	(Sweden) Oliver Åstrand
15 – 7	50.70	51.41	51.49	51.65	52.69	53.64
3000 metres steeplechase	(Finland) Jukka Keskisalo	(Finland) Janne Ukonmaanaho	(Sweden) Daniel Lundgren	(Sweden) Napoleon Solomon	(Finland) Aki Nummela	(Sweden) Eric Senorski
14 – 8	8.46.44	8.47.30	8.54.35	8.55.03	8.58.68	9.06.80
High jump	(Finland) Osku Torro	(Sweden) Emil Svensson	(Finland) Jussi Viita	(Sweden) Mehdi Alkhatib	(Sweden) Jakob Thorvaldsson	(Finland) Richard Östman
12 – 10	2.20	2.15	2.12	2.12	2.08	2.04
Pole vault	(Sweden) Melker Svärd Jacobsson	(Sweden) Oscar Janson	(Finland) Jarno Kivioja	(Sweden) Simon Assarsson	(Finland) Tomas Wecksten	(Finland) Teemu Hyytiä
7 – 15	5.40	5.25	5.15	5.15	5.05	4.90
Long jump	(Sweden) Andreas Otterling	(Finland) Arttu Halmela	(Finland) Henri Väyrynen	(Sweden) Thobias Nilsson-Montler	(Finland) Kristian Pulli	(Sweden) Alexander Wittlock
11 – 11	7,76	7,67	7,64	7,51	7,48	7,32
Triple jump	(Finland) Aleksi Tammentie	(Finland) Kristian Pulli	(Finland) Tuomas Kaukolahti	(Sweden) Mathias Ström	(Sweden) Daniel Lennartson	(Sweden) Simon Karlen
16 – 6	16,25	15,72	15,48	15,48	15,19	15,02
Shot put	(Sweden) Leif Arrhenius	(Sweden) Niklas Arrhenius	(Finland) Arttu Kangas	(Finland) Tomas Söderlund	(Sweden) Daniel Ståhl	(Finland) Mika Lönnblad
8 – 14	19.46	19.34	18.96	18.22	17.80	17.41
Discus throw	(Sweden) Daniel Ståhl	(Sweden) Niklas Arrhenius	(Sweden) Axel Härstedt	(Finland) Pyry Niskala	(Finland) Joni Mattila	(Finland) Jouni Walden
6 – 16	61.77	61.03	59.71	58.45	55.40	54.67
Javelin throw	(Finland) Antti Ruuskanen	(Finland) Tero Pitkämäki	(Finland) Ari Mannio	(Sweden) Kim Amb	(Sweden) Jiannis Smalios	(Sweden) Johan Carlqvist
16 – 6	84.26	83.24	81.89	74.99	71.91	65.34
Hammer throw	(Finland) David Söderberg	(Finland) Tuomas Seppänen	(Finland) Arno Laitinen	(Sweden) Anders Eriksson	(Sweden) Alexander Larsson	(Sweden) Oscar Vestlund
16 – 6	75.96	72.53	69.82	67.10	65.04	65.01
4 × 100 metres relay	(Sweden); Tom Kling-Baptiste, Nil de Oliveira, Alexander Brorsson, Erik Hagberg			(Finland); Eetu Rantala, Ville Myllymäki, Jonathan Åstrand, Samuli Samuelsson		
2 – 5	39,31			39,33		
4 × 400 metres relay	(Finland); Eetu Viitala, Jani Koskela, Oskari Mörö, Ville Lampinen			(Sweden); Alexander Nordqvist, Felix Francois, Axel Bergrahm, Dennis Forsman		
5 – 2	3.09,86			3.10,05		

=== Women ===
Finland's points are shown first

Event / Points	Winner	Second place	Third place	Fourth place	Fifth place	Sixth place
100 metres	(Finland) Hanna-Maari Latvala	(Sweden) Daniella Busk	(Sweden) Isabelle Eurenius	(Sweden) Hanna Adriansson	(Finland) Jasmin Showlah	(Finland) Maria Räsänen
10 – 12	11.51	11.63	11.77	11.84	11.94	11.99
200 metres	(Sweden) Irene Ekelund	(Finland) Hanna-Maari Latvala	(Sweden) Daniella Busk	(Finland) Milja Thureson	(Sweden) Pernilla Nilsson	(Finland) Anniina Kortetmaa
9 – 13	23.46	23.71	23.89	24.44	24.49	24.99
400 metres	(Finland) Katri Mustola	(Sweden) Elin Moraiti	(Sweden) Josefin Magnusson	(Sweden) Elise Malmberg	(Finland) Sanna Aaltonen	(Finland) Eveliina Määttänen
10 – 12	53.62	54.10	54.23	54.26	54.66	54.86
800 metres	(Sweden) Anna Silvander	(Sweden) Lovisa Lindh	(Sweden) Charlotte Schönbeck	(Finland) Sara Kuivisto	(Finland) Karin Storbacka	(Finland) Aino Paunonen
6 – 16	2.08.34	2.08.45	2.08.72	2.09.01	2.09.13	2.09.39
1500 metres	(Sweden) Meraf Bahta	(Finland) Sandra Eriksson	(Sweden) Linn Nilsson	(Sweden) Lovisa Lindh	(Finland) Sara Kuivisto	(Finland) Karin Storbacka
8 – 14	4.10,67	4.11,05	4.16,54	4.19,85	4.21,13	4.28,30
5000 metres	(Sweden) Charlotta Fougberg	(Finland) Oona Kettunen	(Sweden) Klara Bodinsson	(Finland) Camilla Richardsson	(Sweden) Elin Borglund	(Finland) Johanna Peiponen
9 – 13	16.13,14	16.26,55	16.35,12	16.38,91	16.54,26	16.54,93
10000 metres	(Finland) Minna Lamminen	(Finland) Janica Mäkelä	(Sweden) Louise Nilsson	(Sweden) Madeleine Larsson	(Sweden) Malin Liljestedt	(Finland) Nina Chydenius
13 – 9	34.03.19	34.06.68	34.12.73	34.28.36	34.34.19	35.44.49
100 metre hurdles	(Finland) Nooralotta Neziri	(Finland) Matilda Bogdanoff	(Finland) Ida Aidanpää	(Sweden) Madeleine Eriksson	(Sweden) Maja Rogemyr	(Sweden) Adriana Janic
16 – 6	13.23	13.40	13.53	13.70	13.71	14.55
400 metre hurdles	(Sweden) Elise Malmberg	(Finland) Anniina Laitinen	(Finland) Hilla Uusimäki	(Finland) Eveliina Määttänen	(Sweden) Lynette Morgan	(Sweden) Sara Bley
12 – 10	58.42	58.43	58.55	58.60	59.44	59.75
3000 metres steeplechase	(Finland) Sandra Eriksson	(Sweden) Klara Bodinson	(Finland) Oona Kettunen	(Finland) Camilla Richardsson	(Sweden) Marja Larsson	(Sweden) Ronja Fjellner
14 – 8	9.48.45	9.53.23	9.58.19	10.03.83	10.07.42	10.15.12
High jump	(Finland) Laura Rautanen	(Finland) Linda Sandblom	(Sweden) Emma Green	(Sweden) My Nordström	(Finland) Elina Smolander	(Sweden) Sofie Skoog
14 – 8	1.85	1.85	1.83	1.83	1.83	1.77
Pole vault	(Finland) Minna Nikkanen	(Sweden) Michaela Meijer	(Sweden) Elienor Werner	(Finland) Erica Hjerpe	(Finland) Aino Siitonen	(Sweden) Sara Cannmo
12 – 10	4.52 (NR)	4.20	3.00	4.00	3.80	3.80
Long jump	(Sweden) Erica Jarder	(Sweden) Khaddi Sagnia	(Finland) Emmi Mäkinen	(Sweden) Malin Olsson	(Finland) Jaana Sieviläinen	(Finland) Hanna Wiss
7 – 15	6.68	6.27	6.15	6.15	6.13	6.06
Triple jump	(Finland) Kristiina Mäkelä	(Finland) Elina Torro	(Sweden) Jasmin Sabir	(Finland) Essi Lindgren	(Sweden) Madeleine Nilsson	(Sweden) Angelica Ström
15 – 7	13.70	13.00	12.90	12.73	12.47	11.77
Shot put	(Sweden) Frida Åkerström	(Sweden) Fanny Roos	(Finland) Hennariikka Järvinen	(Finland) Katri Hirvonen	(Finland) Suvi Helin	(Sweden) Jessica Samuelsson
9 – 13	15.69	15.49	14.78	14.73	14.65	14.54
Discus throw	(Finland) Sanna Kämäräinen	(Sweden) Heidi Schmidt	(Sweden) Sofia Larsson	(Finland) Katri Hirvonen	(Finland) Tanja Komulainen	(Sweden) Anna Wikström
12 – 10	60.94	55.31	55.13	51.82	50.92	46.33
Javelin throw	(Sweden) Sofi Flink	(Finland) Jelena Jaakkola	(Finland) Oona Sormunen	(Finland) Heidi Nokelainen	(Sweden) Matilda Elfgaard	(Sweden) Elisabeth Höglund
12 – 10	56.39	54.94	54.26	51.77	51.70	48.07
Hammer throw	(Sweden) Tracey Andersson	(Finland) Merja Korpela	(Sweden) Ida Storm	(Finland) Jenni Penttilä	(Sweden) Eleni Larsson	(Finland) Jonna Miettinen
9 – 13	65.73	62.75	62.63	62.53	61.51	61.20
4 × 100 metres relay	Sweden; Irene Ekelund, Isabelle Eurenius, Daniela Busk, Pernilla Nilsson			Finland; Milja Thureson, Hanna-Maari Latvala, Anniina Kortetmaa, Jasmin Showlah		
2 – 5	44,09			44,55		
4 × 400 metres relay	Finland; Hilla Uusimäki, Eveliina Määttänen, Anniina Laitinen, Katri Mustola			Sweden; Josefin Magnusson, Lynette Morgan, Jessica Samuelsson, Elin Moralti		
5 – 2	3.39,24			3.40,22		
