= Finland at the 2014 European Athletics Championships =

- WA code: FIN
- National federation: Finnish Amateur Athletic Association
- Website: www.sul.fi

in Zürich
- Competitors: 36
- Medals Ranked 13th: Gold 1 Silver 0 Bronze 1 Total 2

European Athletics Championships appearances
- 1934; 1938; 1946; 1950; 1954; 1958; 1962; 1966; 1969; 1971; 1974; 1978; 1982; 1986; 1990; 1994; 1998; 2002; 2006; 2010; 2012; 2014; 2016; 2018; 2022; 2024

Finland competed at the 2014 European Athletics Championships winning 2 medals.

== Medals ==
Medal	Name	Event	Date
Gold	Antti Ruuskanen	Men's javelin throw	17 August
Bronze	Tero Pitkämäki	Men's javelin throw	17 August

== Men's events ==
=== Track and road ===
Event	Athletes	Heats		Semifinal		Final	
Event	Athletes	Result	Rank	Result	Rank	Result	Rank
100 m	Eetu Rantala	10.36	14 Q	10.54	21	did not advance	
200 m	Jonathan Åstrand	21.03	21	did not advance			
110 m hurdles	Arttu Hirvonen	13.87 PB	25	did not advance			
400 m hurdles	Jussi Kanervo	50.35 PB	18 q	did not start		did not advance	
400 m hurdles	Oskari Mörö	49.97 PB	13 Q	49.08 NR	4 q	50.14	8
3000 m steeplechase	Jukka Keskisalo	8:35.98	10 Q	—		8:32.70	6
3000 m steeplechase	Janne Ukonmaanaho	8:36.44	13 q	—		8:42.45	11
50 km race walk	Jarkko Kinnunen	—				3:48:49	11
50 km race walk	Veli-Matti Partanen	—				3:52:58 PB	18
4 × 100 m relay	Hannu Hämäläinen; Ville Myllymäki; Eetu Rantala; Jonathan Åstrand	39.47 SB	11	—		did not advance	

=== Field ===
Event	Athletes	Qualification		Final	
Event	Athletes	Result	Rank	Result	Rank
high jump	Jussi Viita	2.19	15	did not advance	
triple jump	Aleksi Tammentie	15.83	21	Did not advance	
shot put	Arttu Kangas	19.07	21	Did not advance	
hammer throw	Tuomas Seppänen	74.37	10 q	73.70	12
hammer throw	David Söderberg	75.83	6 Q	76.55	8
javelin throw	Lassi Etelätalo	78.22	12 q	83.16	4
javelin throw	Tero Pitkämäki	81.48	2 Q	84.40	3rd place, bronze medalist(s)
javelin throw	Antti Ruuskanen	83.76	1 Q	88.01 EL	1st place, gold medalist(s)

== Women's events ==
=== Track ===
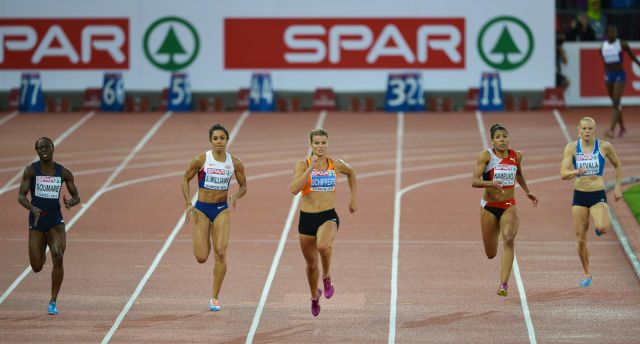
Hanna-Maari Latvala at the 200 meter final (extreme right)

Event	Athletes	Heats		Semifinal		Final	
Event	Athletes	Result	Rank	Result	Rank	Result	Rank
100 m	Hanna-Maari Latvala	11.30 PB	10 Q	11.57	22	did not advance	
200 m	Hanna-Maari Latvala	23.13 SB	7 Q	22.98 PB=	7 q	23.48	7
400 m	Katri Mustola	53.41	22=	did not advance			
100 m hurdles	Ida Aidanpää	13.26	24	did not advance			
100 m hurdles	Matilda Bogdanoff	13.39	30	did not advance			
100 m hurdles	Nooralotta Neziri	13.17	17=	did not advance			
3000 m steeplechase	Sandra Eriksson	9:50.00	4 Q	—		9:47.95	9
3000 m steeplechase	Johanna Lehtinen	9:53.86	13 q	—		9:54.90	11
4 × 100 m relay	Hanna-Maari Latvala; Minna Laukka; Nooralotta Neziri; Milja Thureson	44.22 SB	11	—		did not advance	
4 × 400 m relay	Sanna Aaltonen; Anniina Laitinen; Katri Mustola; Ella Räsänen	3:36.47	12	—		did not advance	

=== Field ===
Event	Athletes	Qualification		Final	
Event	Athletes	Result	Rank	Result	Rank
pole vault	Minna Nikkanen	4.45	3= q	4.35	7=
hammer throw	Merja Korpela	63.71	18	did not advance	
javelin throw	Oona Sormunen	51.46	22	did not advance	
discus throw	Katri Hirvonen	50.93	19	did not advance	
discus throw	Sanna Kämäräinen	54.64	10 q	60.52 PB	7
