= Finland at the 2016 European Athletics Championships =

- WA code: FIN
- National federation: SUL
- Website: www.sul.fi

in Amsterdam
- Competitors: 36 (16 men and 20 women) in 20 events
- Medals Ranked 27th: Gold 0 Silver 0 Bronze 1 Total 1

European Athletics Championships appearances
- 1934; 1938; 1946; 1950; 1954; 1958; 1962; 1966; 1969; 1971; 1974; 1978; 1982; 1986; 1990; 1994; 1998; 2002; 2006; 2010; 2012; 2014; 2016; 2018; 2022; 2024; 2026

Finland competed at the 2016 European Athletics Championships. Team Finland consists of 40 athletes and the official goal for the championships is 10 athletes in the top 8.

== Medals ==
Medal	Name	Event	Date
Bronze	Antti Ruuskanen	Men's javelin throw	7 July

== Men's events ==
=== Track and road ===
Event	Athletes	Heats		Semifinal		Final	
Event	Athletes	Result	Rank	Result	Rank	Result	Rank
200 m	Samuli Samuelsson	21.36	19	Did not advance			
Half marathon	Jarkko Järvenpää	—N/a				1:07:21	50
110 m hurdles	Elmo Lakka	13.72 PB	8 q	13.87	21	Did not advance	
400 m hurdles	Jussi Kanervo	52.35	22	Did not advance			
400 m hurdles	Oskari Mörö	50.37	4 Q	49.37 SB	9 Q	49.24 SB	4
4 x 100 m relay	Eetu Rantala; Otto Ahlfors; Samuli Samuelsson; Ville Myllymäki	39.68	15	—N/a		Did not advance	

=== Field ===
Event	Athletes	Qualification		Final	
Event	Athletes	Result	Rank	Result	Rank
Long jump	Kristian Bäck	7.96	6 q	7.91	5
Long jump	Henri Väyrynen	7.78	14	Did not advance	
Shot put	Arttu Kangas	18.91	20	Did not advance	
Hammer throw	Tuomas Seppänen	69.76	23	Did not advance	
Hammer throw	David Söderberg	72.96	9 q	74.22	7
Javelin throw	Ari Mannio	78.55	19	Did not advance	
Javelin throw	Tero Pitkämäki	80.52	14	Did not advance	
Javelin throw	Antti Ruuskanen	88.23 SB	1 Q	82.44	3rd place, bronze medalist(s)

== Women's events ==
=== Track and road ===
Event	Athletes	Heats		Semifinal		Final	
Event	Athletes	Result	Rank	Result	Rank	Result	Rank
10,000 m	Johanna Peiponen	—N/a				34:39.91	16
Half marathon	Anne-Mari Hyryläinen	—N/a				1:13:13	20
Half marathon	Minna Lamminen	—N/a				1:17:48	67
Half marathon	Laura Manninen	—N/a				1:14:16 PB	35
Half marathon	Team	—N/a				3:45:17	12
100 m hurdles	Reetta Hurske	13.16 PB	9 q	13.40	21	Did not advance	
100 m hurdles	Nooralotta Neziri	Bye		13.05	14	Did not advance	
400 m hurdles	Anniina Laitinen	1:01.56	23	Did not advance			
400 m hurdles	Hilla Uusimäki	57.59 PB	12 q	57.76	22	Did not advance	
3000 m steeplechase	Sandra Eriksson	9:41.16	3 Q	—N/a		9:45.71	10
3000 m steeplechase	Camilla Richardsson	9:54.80	20	—N/a		Did not advance	

=== Field ===
Event	Athletes	Qualification		Final	
Event	Athletes	Result	Rank	Result	Rank
High jump	Linda Sandblom	1.89	13	Did not advance	
Pole vault	Wilma Murto	4.35	11 q	4.45	7
Pole vault	Minna Nikkanen	4.45	9 q	4.45	9
Triple jump	Kristiina Mäkelä	13.80	12 q	13.95 SB	9
Discus throw	Salla Sipponen	54.95	19	Did not advance	
Hammer throw	Merja Korpela	67.78	13	Did not advance	
Hammer throw	Inga Linne	66.53	16	Did not advance	
Javelin throw	Jenni Kangas	59.48 PB	7 q	59.41	9
Javelin throw	Heidi Nokelainen	52.40	30	Did not advance	
Javelin throw	Sanni Utriainen	57.19	16	Did not advance	
