= Finland at the 1978 European Athletics Championships =

- WA code: FIN

in Prague
- Competitors: 33
- Medals: Gold 1 Silver 2 Bronze 3 Total 6

European Athletics Championships appearances
- 1934; 1938; 1946; 1950; 1954; 1958; 1962; 1966; 1969; 1971; 1974; 1978; 1982; 1986; 1990; 1994; 1998; 2002; 2006; 2010; 2012; 2014; 2016; 2018; 2022; 2024; 2026

Finland sent 33 athletes to the 1978 European Athletics Championships which took place 29 August–3 September 1978 in Prague. Finland won six medals at the Championships.

== Medalists ==
| Medal | Name | Event |
|---|---|---|
| 1st place, gold medalist(s) | Martti Vainio | Men's 10,000m |
| 2nd place, silver medalist(s) | Antti Kalliomäki | Men's pole vault |
| 2nd place, silver medalist(s) | Markku Tuokko | Men's discus |
| 3rd place, bronze medalist(s) | Arto Bryggare | Men's 110m hurdles |
| 3rd place, bronze medalist(s) | Ismo Toukonen | Men's 3000m steeplechase |
| 3rd place, bronze medalist(s) | Rauli Pudas | Men's pole vault |
