= List of Finnish records in athletics =

The following are the national records in athletics in Finland maintained by Finland's national athletics federation: Suomen Urheiluliitto (SUL).

Starting in 2016, Finnish indoor records superior to the outdoor record in the same event will be considered national records both indoors and outdoors. This rule only applies to records set in 2016 or later, and is not retroactively applied to older indoor records. (Note: In accordance with this rule, the indoor marks of Wilma Murto in women's pole vault and Sandra Eriksson in women's mile run are considered Finnish records both indoors and outdoors, while the indoor records of Mika Halvari in men's shot put, Osku Torro in men's high jump and Jani Lehtonen in men's pole vault are not considered national outdoor records.)

== Outdoor ==
Key to tables: Awaiting ratification Record not kept by SUL Not ratified or later rescinded by SUL

=== Men ===
Event	Record	Athlete	Date	Meet	Place	Ref.
100 m	10.12 (+0.9 m/s)	Samuli Samuelsson	17 June 2023	Kuortane Games	Kuortane, Finland	
150 m	15.23 (+0.3 m/s)	Samuli Samuelsson	22 August 2023		Espoo, Finland	
200 m	20.38 (+0.5 m/s)	Riku Illukka	13 August 2026	European Championships	Birmingham, United Kingdom	
300 m	33.18	Konsta Alatupa	21 May 2025	Espoo Liikkuu Games	Espoo, Finland	
400 m	45.49	Markku Kukkoaho	7 September 1972	Olympic Games	Munich, West Germany	
500 m	1:02.52	Olli Turunen	30 May 1989		Helsinki, Finland	
600 m	1:16.93	Mikko Lahtio	5 August 2009		Lahti, Finland	
800 m	1:44.10	Ari Suhonen	16 August 1989	Weltklasse Zürich	Zürich, Switzerland	
1000 m	2:16.88	Ari Suhonen	19 August 1987		Lahti, Finland	
1500 m	3:34.89	Santtu Heikkinen	28 June 2026	Meeting International Troyes Aube	Troyes, France	
Mile	3:55.65	Ari Paunonen	26 June 1977		London, United Kingdom	
Mile (road)	4:01.35	Santtu Heikkinen	1 October 2023	World Road Running Championships	Riga, Latvia	
2000 m	5:00.32	Jukka Keskisalo	25 July 2009		Lapinlahti, Finland	
3000 m	7:43.2 h	Lasse Virén	27 July 1972		Oulu, Finland	
3000 m	7:43.20	Ari Paunonen	22 June 1977		Cologne, West Germany	
Two miles	8:14.0 h	Lasse Virén	14 August 1972		Stockholm, Sweden	
5000 m	13:16.3 h	Lasse Virén	14 September 1972		Helsinki, Finland	
5000 m	13:16.02 X	Martti Vainio	28 June 1984		Oslo, Norway	
5 km (road)	13:42	Risto Ulmala	17 October 1993		Providence, United States	
10,000 m	27:30.99	Martti Vainio	29 August 1978	European Championships	Prague, Czechoslovakia	
10 km (road)	27:50	Mustafe Muuse	11 January 2026	10K Valencia Ibercaja by Kiprun	Valencia, Spain	
15 km (road)	43:56	Risto Ulmala	15 February 1992		Tampa, United States	
20 km (road)	58:49	Jussi Utriainen	9 March 2003		Alphen aan den Rijn, Netherlands	
One hour	20296 m	Seppo Tuominen	2 October 1971		Colombes, France	
Half marathon	1:02:50	Jussi Utriainen	27 March 2011	Venloop	Venlo, Netherlands	
25 km (road)	1:15:15	Esko Lipsonen	30 April 1978		Helsinki, Finland	
30 km (road)	1:35:43	Max Holmnäs	14 October 1973		Handen, Sweden	
Marathon	2:10:46	Janne Holmén	13 April 2008	Rotterdam Marathon	Rotterdam, Netherlands	
100 km	6:46:16	Henri Ansio	27 November 2016		Los Alcázares, Spain	
24 hours (road)	283.560 km (Note: by official result source and tilastopaja.fi; 283.699 by other sources)	Matti Jonkka	19 October 2025	IAU 24 Hour World Championship	Albi, France	
110 m hurdles	13.31 (−0.3 m/s)	Elmo Lakka	2 June 2021	Motonet GP	Jyväskylä, Finland	
200 m hurdles	23.24 (+0.3 m/s)	Oskari Mörö	7 June 2020	Uusi Alku Meeting	Lahti, Finland	
300 m hurdles	36.04	Ismo Hämeenniemi	26 May 1992		Helsinki, Finland	
400 m hurdles	48.61	Antti Sainio	19 July 2025	European U23 Championships	Bergen, Norway	
3000 m steeplechase	8:10.67	Jukka Keskisalo	28 August 2009	Weltklasse Zürich	Zürich, Switzerland	
High jump	2.31 m	Mika Polku	22 July 2000		Viitasaari, Finland	
High jump	2.31 m	Toni Huikuri	11 June 2002		Bratislava, Slovakia	
Pole vault	5.82 m	Jani Lehtonen	26 June 1993		Kuortane, Finland	
Long jump	8.27 m (+1.8 m/s)	Kristian Pulli	11 June 2020		Espoo, Finland	
Triple jump	17.14 m (−0.5 m/s)	Simo Lipsanen	16 July 2017	European U23 Championships	Bydgoszcz, Poland	
Shot put	21.69 m	Reijo Ståhlberg	5 May 1979		Fresno, United States	
Discus throw	69.97 m	Frantz Kruger	15 September 2007		Helsingborg, Sweden	
Hammer throw	83.30 m	Olli-Pekka Karjalainen	14 July 2004		Lahti, Finland	
Javelin throw	93.09 m	Aki Parviainen	26 June 1999		Kuortane, Finland	
Weight throw	22.13 m	Juha Tiainen	30 June 1990		Mäntyharju, Finland	
Decathlon	8730 pts	Eduard Hämäläinen	5–6 August 1997	World Championships	Athens, Greece	
Decathlon	100m (wind) / Long jump (wind) / Shot put / High jump / 400m / 110m H (wind) / Discus / Pole vault / Javelin / 1500m; 10.81 (+0.8 m/s) / 7.56 m (+0.9 m/s) / 15.71 m / 1.97 m / 46.71 / 13.74 (+0.8 m/s) / 50.50 m / 5.20 m / 59.82 m / 4:37.10					
3000 m walk (track)	11:19.49	Reima Salonen	9 June 1989		Helsinki, Finland	
5000 m walk (track)	18:43.17	Aku Partanen	13 June 2018		Espoo, Finland	
10,000 m walk (track)	38:44.13	Aku Partanen	1 September 2018	Finland-Sweden Athletics International	Tampere, Finland	
10 km walk (road)	38:59	Aku Partanen	14 April 2012		Tuusula, Finland	
20,000 m walk (track)	1:22:22.6 h	Valentin Kononen	6 June 1993		Kangasniemi, Finland	
20 km walk (road)	1:18:22	Veli-Matti Partanen	19 August 2023	World Championships	Budapest, Hungary	
30 km walk (road)	2:06:49+	Veli-Matti Partanen	24 August 2023	World Championships	Budapest, Hungary	
35 km walk (road)	2:28:22	Aleksi Ojala	24 July 2022	World Championships	Eugene, United States	
50 km walk (road)	3:39:34	Valentin Kononen	26 March 2000	Dudinská Päťdesiatka	Dudince, Slovakia	
4 × 100 m relay	38.92	Finland; Eetu Rantala; Otto Ahlfors; Oskari Lehtonen; Samuel Purola	12 August 2018	European Championships	Berlin, Germany	
4 × 200 m relay	1:25.7 h	J. Tapola; R. Vilen; K. Wauhkonen; J. Salmi	30 July 1970		Helsinki, Finland	
4 × 400 m relay	3:01.12	Finland; Stig Lönnqvist; Ari Salin; Ossi Karttunen; Markku Kukkoaho	10 September 1972	Olympic Games	Munich, West Germany	

=== Women ===
Event	Record	Athlete	Date	Meet	Place	Ref.
100 m	11.13 (+1.0 m/s)	Helinä Marjamaa	19 July 1983		Lahti, Finland	
150 m	17.26 (+1.5 m/s)	Aino Pulkkinen	15 May 2024	Harju Cup	Jyväskylä, Finland	
200 m	22.39 (+0.6 m/s)	Mona-Lisa Pursiainen	20 August 1973		Moscow, Soviet Union	
300 m	36.71	Mette Baas	3 June 2025	Trond Mohn Games	Bergen, Norway	
400 m	50.14	Riitta Salin	4 September 1974	European Championships	Rome, Italy	
500 m	1:19.1 h	Helle Aro	26 April 1993		Vantaa, Finland	
600 m	1:27.12	Eveliina Määttänen	23 May 2023	Harju Cup	Jyväskylä, Finland	
800 m	1:59.41	Sara Kuivisto	31 July 2021	Olympic Games	Tokyo, Japan	
1000 m	2:36.15	Sara Lappalainen	27 July 2024	Topgames Sprint	Porvoo, Finland	
1500 m	4:02.35	Sara Kuivisto	4 August 2021	Olympic Games	Tokyo, Japan	
Mile	4:28.12	Sara Lappalainen	26 August 2023		Stirling, United Kingdom	
Mile	4:23.38	Kristiina Mäki (Note: no eligible due to dual citizenship FIN/CZE)	3 September 2021		Brussels, Belgium	
2000 m	5:42.71	Kristiina Mäki	17 June 2014	Golden Spike Ostrava	Ostrava, Czech Republic	
3000 m	8:32.23	Nathalie Blomqvist	30 May 2024	Bislett Games	Oslo, Norway	
Two miles	9:41.36	Annemari Sandell	8 June 1996		Tornio, Finland	
5000 m	14:44.72	Nathalie Blomqvist	7 June 2024	European Championships	Rome, Italy	
5 km (road)	15:10 Wo	Ilona Mononen	18 April 2026	Seven Hills Record Run	Nijmegen, Netherlands	
10,000 m	31:12.78	Camilla Richardsson	20 May 2023	Night of the 10K PB's	London, United Kingdom	
10 km (road)	31:59	Johanna Peiponen	28 May 2016	Oulu Terwahölkkä	Oulu, Finland	
15 km (road)	49:17	Annemari Sandell	16 November 1997		Nijmegen, Netherlands	
20 km (road)	1:05:52+	Alisa Vainio	15 September 2024	Copenhagen Half Marathon	Copenhagen, Denmark	
Half marathon	1:09:30	Alisa Vainio	15 September 2024	Copenhagen Half Marathon	Copenhagen, Denmark	
25 km (road)	1:23:46+	Alisa Vainio	7 December 2025	Valencia Marathon	Valencia, Spain	
25 km (road)	1:23:46+	Alisa Vainio	15 February 2026	Seville Marathon	Seville, Spain	
30 km (road)	1:40:29+	Alisa Vainio	15 February 2026	Seville Marathon	Seville, Spain	
Marathon	2:20:39	Alisa Vainio	15 February 2026	Seville Marathon	Seville, Spain	
100 km	7:40:20	Satu Lipiäinen	1 July 2022		Salo, Finland	
12-hour run	153.600 km	Satu Lipiäinen	20 May 2023	Ultra run	Kokkola, Finland	
100 m hurdles	12.65 (+1.5 m/s)	Lotta Harala	14 July 2024		La Chaux de Fonds, Switzerland	
200 m hurdles	26.65 (−0.9 m/s)	Nooralotta Neziri	11 June 2020	Impossible Games	Oslo, Norway	
300 m hurdles	38.50	Viivi Lehikoinen	31 May 2022	Golden Spike Ostrava	Ostrava, Czech Republic	
400 m hurdles	54.40	Viivi Lehikoinen	6 June 2023	Meeting Iberoamericano de Atletismo	Huelva, Spain	
2000 m steeplechase	6:18.09	Johanna Lehtinen	17 July 2006		Tampere, Finland	
3000 m steeplechase	9:21.02	Ilona Mononen	15 September 2025	World Championships	Tokyo, Japan	
3000 m steeplechase	9:18.50	Ilona Mononen	3 June 2026	Paavo Nurmi Games	Turku, Finland	
3000 m steeplechase	9:15.18	Ilona Mononen	7 June 2026	BAUHAUS Galan	Stockholm, Sweden	
High jump	1.97 m	Ella Junnila	18 June 2024	Paavo Nurmi Games	Turku, Finland	
Pole vault	4.85 m	Wilma Murto	17 August 2022	European Championships	Munich, Germany	
Long jump	6.85 m (+0.8 m/s)	Ringa Ropo-Junnila	9 August 1990		Lahti, Finland	
Triple jump	14.64 m (−0.4 m/s)	Kristiina Mäkelä	19 August 2022	European Championships	Munich, Germany	
Shot put	18.57 m	Asta Ovaska	20 August 1989		Stockholm, Sweden	
Discus throw	67.02 m	Ulla Lundholm	23 August 1983		Helsinki, Finland	
Hammer throw	77.35 m	Krista Tervo	28 May 2026	Trond Mohn Games	Bergen, Norway	
Javelin throw	64.90 m	Paula Huhtaniemi	10 August 2003		Helsinki, Finland	
Weight throw	21.47 m	Suvi Koskinen	14 September 2019		Kurikka, Finland	
Heptathlon	6563 pts	Saga Vanninen	19–20 July 2025	European U23 Championships	Bergen, Norway	
Heptathlon	100m H (wind) / High jump / Shot put / 200m (wind) / Long jump (wind) / Javelin / 800m; 13.25 (+1.1 m/s) / 1.80 m / 15.09 m / 24.25 (−1.0 m/s) / 6.49 m (−0.3 m/s) / 43.74 m / 2:11.00					
3000 m walk (track)	11:59.60	Sari Essayah	27 June 1993		Lapinlahti, Finland	
5000 m walk (track)	20:28.62	Sari Essayah	9 July 1994		Tuusula, Finland	
5 km walk (road)	21:15.6	Sari Essayah	12 August 1989		Lapinlahti, Finland	
10,000 m walk (track)	42:37.0 h	Sari Essayah	8 May 1993		Fana, Norway	
10 km walk (road)	42:20	Sari Essayah	7 August 1995	World Championships	Gothenburg, Sweden	
20 km walk (road)	1:32:05	Sari Essayah	5 May 1996		Vantaa, Finland	
35 km walk (road)	2:57:42	Elisa Neuvonen	22 July 2022	World Championships	Eugene, United States	
50 km walk (road)	4:29:25	Tiia Kuikka	19 May 2019	European Cup	Alytus, Lithuania	
4 × 100 m relay	43.37	Finland; Anu Pirttimaa; Sisko Hanhijoki; Sanna Hernesniemi; Marja Salmela	21 August 1993	World Championships	Stuttgart, Germany	
4 × 400 m relay	3:25.7	Finland; Marika Eklund; Mona-Lisa Pursiainen; Pirjo Häggman; Riitta Salin	8 September 1974	European Championships	Rome, Italy	

=== Mixed ===
Event	Record	Athlete	Date	Meet	Place	Ref.
4 × 400 m relay	3:15.60	Finland; Konsta Alatupa; Mette Baas; Eljas Aalto; Viivi Lehikoinen	29 June 2025	European Team Championships	Madrid, Spain	

== Indoor ==
=== Men ===
Event	Record	Athlete	Date	Meet	Place	Ref.	Video
50 m	5.77	Markus Pöyhönen	23 February 2003		Liévin, France		
60 m	6.58	Markus Pöyhönen	4 March 2003		Helsinki, Finland		
60 m	6.58	Markus Pöyhönen	14 March 2003	World Championships	Birmingham, United Kingdom		
60 m	6.4 h	Erik Gustafsson	26 February 1972		Turku, Finland		
100 m	10.36	Joni Rautanen	12 February 2009		Korsholm, Finland		
150 m	15.94	Viljami Kaasalainen	3 February 2024	Hipposhallit 2	Jyväskylä, Finland		
150 m	15.65 OT	Jonathan Åstrand	7 February 2012		Korsholm, Finland		
200 m	20.72	Jonathan Åstrand	9 February 2013		Växjö, Sweden		
300 m	33.46	Eljas Aalto	29 January 2025	Grand Prix Jyväskylä	Jyväskylä, Finland		
300 m	33.04 OT	Juha Pyy	25 February 1986		Luleå, Sweden		
400 m	47.09	Jussi Heikkilä	2 March 2008	SEC Championships	Fayetteville, United States		
400 m	46.79 OT	Juha Pyy	27 February 1988		Tampere, Finland		
600 m	1:19.14	Esko Parpala	12 February 1994		Rovaniemi, Finland		
800 m	1:47.36	Markku Taskinen	12 March 1978	European Championships	Milan, Italy		
800 m	1:47.06 OT	Wilson Kirwa	13 February 2000		Kuopio, Finland		
800 m	1:47.21 OT	Ari Suhonen	13 February 1988		Tampere, Finland		
1000 m	2:22.74	Wilson Kirwa	21 February 2001		Athens, Greece		
1500 m	3:38.16	Antti Loikkanen	12 March 1978	European Championships	Milan, Italy		
Mile	3:58.20	Antti Loikkanen	20 January 1979		Los Angeles, United States		
2000 m	5:20.18	Jukka Tammisuo	13 February 1996		Jyväskylä, Finland		
3000 m	7:51.13	Tuomas Heikkilä	9 February 2025	Nordic Championships	Espoo, Finland		
Two miles	8:43.4 h	Ari Paunonen	1 February 1980		Inglewood, United States		
5000 m	13:29.51	Mustafe Muuse	13 February 2026	BU David Hemery Valentine Invitational	Boston, United States		
10,000 m	29:05.6 h	Seppo Tuominen	17 February 1974		Vierumäki, Heinola rural municipality, Finland		
50 m hurdles	6.47	Arto Bryggare	22 February 1981		Grenoble, France		
60 m hurdles	7.56	Arto Bryggare	6 March 1983	European Championships	Budapest, Hungary		
60 m hurdles	7.56	Arto Bryggare	22 February 1987	Meeting Pas de Calais	Liévin, France		
110 m hurdles	13.58	Arto Bryggare	30 December 1982		Lahti, Finland		
300 m hurdles	35.56 OT	Petteri Pulkkinen	11 February 1995		Tampere, Finland		
400 m hurdles	50.59 OT	Jussi Heikkilä	9 February 2005	Botnia Games	Korsholm, Finland		
High jump	2.33 m	Osku Torro	5 February 2011	Finland–Sweden–Norway Indoor Match	Tampere, Finland		
Pole vault	5.83 m	Jani Lehtonen	8 March 1994		Stockholm, Sweden		
Long jump	8.24 m	Kristian Pulli	5 March 2021	European Championships	Toruń, Poland		
Triple jump	16.98 m	Simo Lipsanen	10 February 2019	Meeting Pas de Calais	Liévin, France		
Shot put	22.09 m	Mika Halvari	7 February 2000		Tampere, Finland		
Weight throw	22.81 m	Henri Liipola	12 February 2022	Nordic Indoor Match	Uppsala, Sweden		
Discus throw	64.00 m	Frantz Kruger	18 February 2008	Botnia Games	Korsholm, Finland		
Javelin throw	85.78 m	Matti Närhi	3 March 1996		Kajaani, Finland		
Heptathlon	5810 pts	Vesa Rantanen	10–11 February 2001		Jyväskylä, Finland		
Heptathlon	60m / Long jump / Shot put / High jump / 60m H / Pole vault / 1000m; 7.12 / 6.83 m / 10.74 m / 2.06 m / 8.03 / 5.50 m / 2:49.94						
Heptathlon	5866 pts h	Johannes Lahti	31 January-1 February 1980		Heinola, Finland		
Heptathlon	60m / Long jump / Shot put / High jump / 60m H / Pole vault / 1000m; 6.7 / 7.05 m / 14.91 m / 2.08 m / 8.2 / 4.60 m / 2:45.8						
Heptathlon	6026 pts OT	Petri Keskitalo	11–12 February 1995		Kuopio, Finland		
Heptathlon	60m / Long jump / Shot put / High jump / 60m H / Pole vault / 1000m; 6.96 / 7.41 m / 15.37 m / 1.89 m / 7.00 / 5.10 m / 2:49.20						
3000 m walk	10:56.88	Reima Salonen	5 February 1984		Turku, Finland		
5000 m walk	18:39.01	Veli-Matti Partanen	5 February 2022	Avoimet Helsy-hallit 2	Helsinki, Finland		
10,000 m walk	38:46.0 h	Reima Salonen	9 March 1988		Turku, Finland		
4 × 200 m relay	1:26.21	Finland	24 February 2001		Umeå, Sweden		
4 × 400 m relay	3:18.16	IF Närpes Kraft; Staffan Holmberg; Stefan Ivars; Thomas Asp; Hans Nordman	27 February 1994		Jyväskylä, Finland		

=== Women ===
Event	Record	Athlete	Date	Meet	Place	Ref.
50 m	6.25 (Note: by World Athletics source; 6.26 by other sources, probably a typo)	Heidi Hannula	3 March 2006		Liévin, France	
60 m	7.16	Lotta Kemppinen	20 February 2021	Finnish Championships	Jyväskylä, Finland	
60 m	7.16	Lotta Kemppinen	21 March 2026	World Championships	Toruń, Poland	
100 m	11.41	Johanna Manninen	14 February 2004		Tampere, Finland	
150 m	18.16	Silja Kempas	15 January 2023		Jyväskylä, Finland	
150 m	17.73 OT	Sari Keskitalo	11 February 2010		Mustasaari, Finland	
200 m	23.03	Sanna Hernesniemi-Kyllönen	14 March 1993	World Championships	Toronto, Canada	
300 m	37.09	Mette Baas	29 January 2025	GP Jyväskylä	Jyväskylä, Finland	
400 m	51.42	Mette Baas	20 March 2026	World Championships	Toruń, Poland	
600 m	1:31.45	Kristiina Halonen	15 January 2023		Jyväskylä, Finland	
600 m	1:28.65 OT	Sara Kuivisto	14 February 2021		Pajulahti, Finland	
800 m	2:02.36	Sara Kuivisto	2 March 2022	Villa de Madrid Indoor Meeting	Madrid, Spain	
1000 m	2:42.33	Marjo Venäläinen	25 February 1999		Stockholm, Sweden	
1500 m	4:06.14	Sara Kuivisto	22 February 2022	Copernicus Cup	Toruń, Poland	
Mile	4:29.64	Sara Kuivisto	17 February 2022	Meeting Hauts-de-France Pas-de-Calais	Liévin, France	
2000 m	5:50.26	Johanna Lehtinen	6 February 2005		Leipzig, Germany	
3000 m	8:51.95	Nathalie Blomqvist	25 January 2025	Antequera Indoor Match	Antequera, Spain	
3000 m	8:49.25 OT	Nathalie Blomqvist	18 February 2024		Tampere, Finland	
5000 m	16:16.13	Minna Rasimus	5 February 1999		Indianapolis, United States	
5000 m	16:09.36 OT	Minttu Hukka	29 January 2016	University of Washington Invitational	Seattle, United States	
Marathon	2:42:30	Laura Manninen	25 March 2017	The Armory Indoor Marathon	New York City, United States	
50 m hurdles	7.68	Marianne Mattas	15 February 1996		Vaasa, Finland	
50 m hurdles	7.2 h	Ritva Valkeinen	13 March 1983		Laukaa, Finland	
60 m hurdles	7.79	Reetta Hurske	22 February 2023	World Indoor Tour Madrid	Madrid, Spain	
60 m hurdles	7.79	Reetta Hurske	5 March 2023	European Championships	Istanbul, Turkey	
300 m hurdles	40.57 OT	Essi Niskala	20 February 2022	Finnish Championships	Kuopio, Finland	
400 m hurdles	58.68 OT	Emma Millard	22 February 2009		Korsholm, Finland	
High jump	1.96 m	Ella Junnila	7 March 2021	European Championships	Toruń, Poland	
Pole vault	4.81 m	Wilma Murto	6 January 2024		Kuortane, Finland	
Long jump	6.78 m	Ringa Ropo-Junnila	19 February 1991	GE Galan	Stockholm, Sweden	
Triple jump	14.38 m	Kristiina Mäkelä	8 February 2019	Villa de Madrid Indoor Meeting	Madrid, Spain	
Shot put	17.84 m	Asta Hovi-Ovaska	23 February 1986	European Championships	Madrid, Spain	
Weight throw	22.76 m	Sara Killinen	14 February 2025	Tiger Paw Invitational	Clemson, United States	
Discus throw	60.67 m	Sanna Kämäräinen	8 February 2014	Indoor Match FIN-SWE-NOR-DEN/ISL	Tampere, Finland	
Javelin throw	61.29 m	Taina Uppa	28 February 1999		Korsholm, Finland	
Javelin throw	64.68 m (Old design)	Mikaela Ingberg	5 March 1995		Kajaani, Finland	
Pentathlon	4922 pts	Saga Vanninen	9 March 2025	European Championships	Apeldoorn, Netherlands	
Pentathlon	60m H / High jump / Shot put / Long jump / 800m; 8.19 / 1.81 m / 15.56 m / 6.52 m / 2:12.20					
3000 m walk	12:06.10	Sari Essayah	13 March 1993	World Championships	Toronto, Canada	
5000 m walk	24:17.41	Heli Nevanpää	3 February 1990		Turku, Finland	
4 × 200 m relay	1:36.13	Finland; Lotta Harala; Anniina Laitinen; Ella Räsänen; Hanna-Maari Latvala	9 February 2013		Växjö, Sweden	
4 × 400 m relay	3:55.20	Lappeenrannan Urheilu-Miehet; Stiina Rossi; Marjut Töyli; Hanna Häkkinen; Annika Kumlin	27 February 1994		Jyväskylä, Finland	

== See also ==
- Finnish Championships in Athletics
