= Finland at the 1974 European Athletics Championships =

- WA code: FIN

in Rome
- Competitors: 33
- Medals: Gold 4 Silver 1 Bronze 5 Total 10

European Athletics Championships appearances
- 1934; 1938; 1946; 1950; 1954; 1958; 1962; 1966; 1969; 1971; 1974; 1978; 1982; 1986; 1990; 1994; 1998; 2002; 2006; 2010; 2012; 2014; 2016; 2018; 2022; 2024

Finland sent 33 athletes to the 1974 European Athletics Championships which took place 1 – 8 September in Rome. Finland won ten medals at the Championships.

== Medalists ==
Medal	Name	Event
1st place, gold medalist(s)	Pentti Kahma	Men's discus throw
1st place, gold medalist(s)	Hannu Siitonen	Men's javelin throw
1st place, gold medalist(s)	Riitta Salin	Women's 400 m
1st place, gold medalist(s)	Nina Holmén	Women's 3000 m
2nd place, silver medalist(s)	Marika Eklund; Mona-Lisa Pursiainen; Pirjo Häggman; Riitta Salin	Women's 4 × 400 m relay
3rd place, bronze medalist(s)	Markku Taskinen	Men's 800 m
3rd place, bronze medalist(s)	Lasse Virén	Men's 5000 m
3rd place, bronze medalist(s)	Stig Lönnqvist; Ossi Karttunen; Markku Taskinen; Markku Kukkoaho	Men's 4 × 400 m relay
3rd place, bronze medalist(s)	Mona-Lisa Pursiainen	Women's 200 m
3rd place, bronze medalist(s)	Pirkko Helenius	Women's long jump
