= Finland at the 1982 European Athletics Championships =

- WA code: FIN

in Athens
- Competitors: 38
- Medals: Gold 1 Silver 0 Bronze 3 Total 4

European Athletics Championships appearances
- 1934; 1938; 1946; 1950; 1954; 1958; 1962; 1966; 1969; 1971; 1974; 1978; 1982; 1986; 1990; 1994; 1998; 2002; 2006; 2010; 2012; 2014; 2016; 2018; 2022; 2024

Finland sent 38 athletes to the 1982 European Athletics Championships which took place 6–12 September 1982 in Athens. Finland won four medals at the Championships.

== Medalists ==
Medal	Name	Event
1st place, gold medalist(s)	Reima Salonen	Men's 50 km walk
3rd place, bronze medalist(s)	Jorma Härkönen	Men's 800 m
3rd place, bronze medalist(s)	Martti Vainio	Men's 10,000 m
3rd place, bronze medalist(s)	Arto Bryggare	Men's 110 m hurdles
