= Finland at the 1986 European Athletics Championships =

- WA code: FIN

in Stuttgart
- Competitors: 31
- Medals: Gold 0 Silver 1 Bronze 0 Total 1

European Athletics Championships appearances
- 1934; 1938; 1946; 1950; 1954; 1958; 1962; 1966; 1969; 1971; 1974; 1978; 1982; 1986; 1990; 1994; 1998; 2002; 2006; 2010; 2012; 2014; 2016; 2018; 2022; 2024

Finland sent 31 athletes to the 1986 European Athletics Championships which took place 26–31 August 1986 in Stuttgart, West Germany. Finland won one medal at the Championships.

== Medalists ==
Medal	Name	Event
2nd place, silver medalist(s)	Arto Bryggare	Men's 110 m hurdles
