= Mette Baas =

Finnish athlete (born 2000)

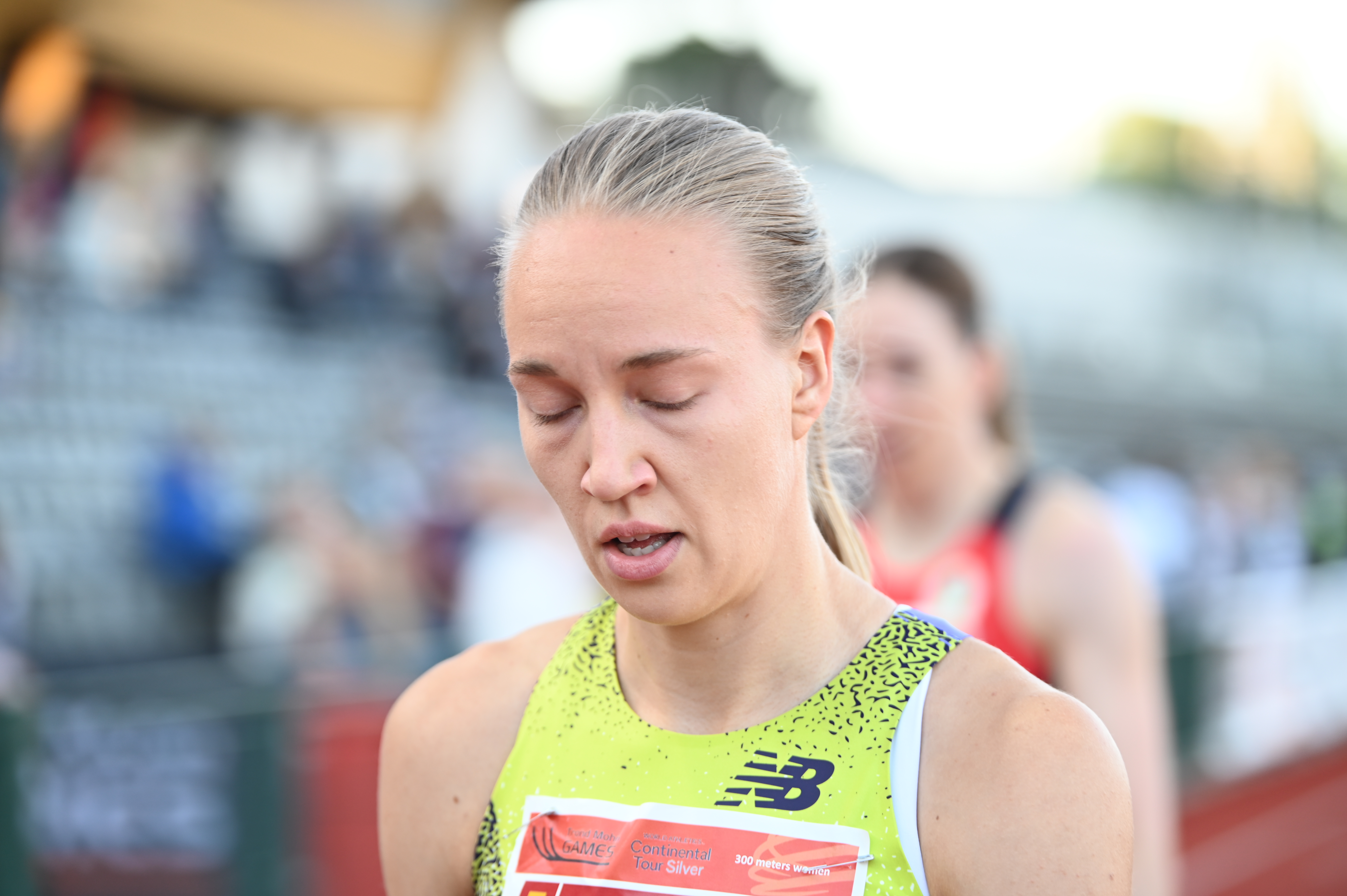
- Baas in 2026

Personal information
- Nationality: Finnish
- Born: 10 September 2000 (age 25)

Sport
- Sport: Athletics
- Event: Sprint

Achievements and titles
- Personal bests: 400m: 51.47 (Madrid, 2025); Indoors; 400m: 51.42 (Toruń, 2026) NR

Mette Baas (born 10 September 2000) is a Finnish sprinter. She predominantly competes over 400 metres, and is a multiple-time national champion and is the indoor national record holder.

== Biography ==
Baas was born in Lavia, Finland, but grew up in Tornio. She later moved to Joensuu where she studied computer science at the University of Applied Sciences and changed her athletics club from Veitsiluoto Kisaveikot to Joensuu Kataja. She competed for Finland at the 2018 IAAF World U20 Championships in Tampere.

In 2021, Baas ran the fastest time by a Finnish woman for the 400 metres since Kirsi Mykkänen in 2005, when she ran 52.76 seconds in the Finnkampen. She ran a 400 metres personal best of 52.51 in Gothenburg in 2022. In 2024, she lowered her personal best for the 400 metres to 52.10, whilst competing in Lahti. She represented Finland at the 2024 European Athletics Championships.

Baas competed for Finland at the 2025 European Athletics Indoor Championships in Apeldoorn, Netherlands, where she ran a Finnish indoor national record of 52.25 seconds.

Baas ran a Finnish national best time of 36.71 seconds to finish runner-up to Henriette Jaeger in the lesser-run 300 metres in Bergen in June 2025, breaking her own previous best national mark of 37.09 seconds. Later that month, she represented Finland at the 2025 European Athletics Team Championships, where she ran a personal best 51.47 seconds for the 400 metres, to finish with the sixth fastest time in the First Division. It was the fastest time by a Finnish athlete since Pirjo Häggman at the 1980 Moscow Olympics.

Baas competed for the Finnish team at the 2025 World Athletics Championships in Tokyo, Japan, in the women's 400 metres.

Baas made a strong start to her 2026 indoor season with a win at the BAUHAUS-Galan Indoor, a World Athletics Indoor Tour Silver meeting, winning the women's 400m in 52.57. On 1 February, Baas broke her own Finnish indoor 400m record with 51.65 at the Nordenkampen in Karlstad, becoming the first Finn to break the 52 second-barrier indoors. Baas set a Finnish indoor record of 51.42 to reach the semi-finals of the 400 m at the 2026 World Athletics Indoor Championships in Toruń, Poland, but did not advance to the final after placing fourth in 52.36 in a well contested semi-final.
