= Nathalie Blomqvist =

Finnish athlete (born 2001)

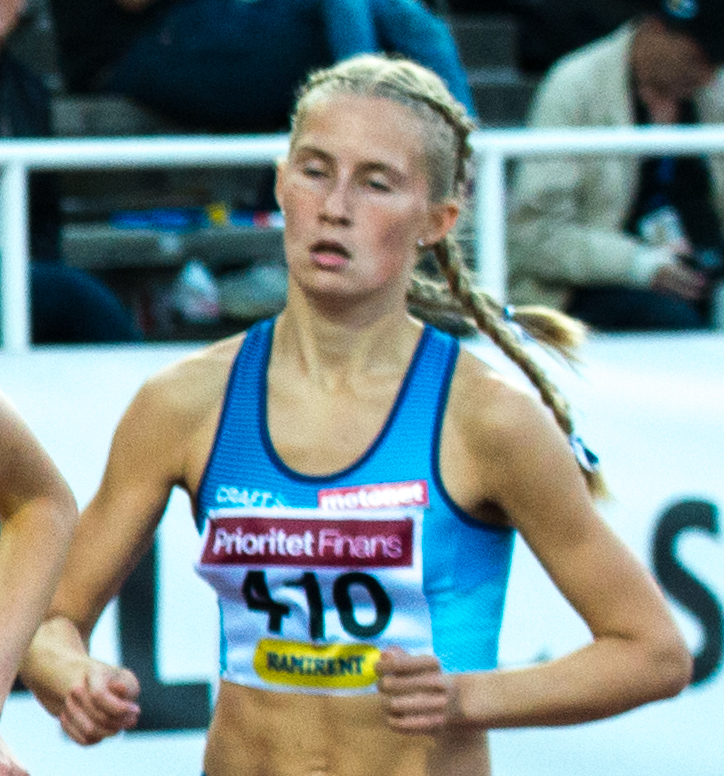
- Blomqvist at the 2019 Finland-Sweden Athletics International

Personal information
- Nationality: Finnish
- Born: 20 April 2001 (age 25)

Sport
- Sport: Athletics
- Event: Long distance running

Achievements and titles
- Personal bests: 1500m: 4:04.76 (Tomblaine, 2024); 3000m: 8:32.23 (Oslo, 2024) NR; 5000m: 14:44.72 (Rome, 2024) NR
Medal record
Women's athletics
Representing Finland
European Cross Country Championships
Bronze medal – third place	2023 Brussels	U23 race

Nathalie Blomqvist (born 20 April 2001) is a Finnish middle and long distance runner. She is a multiple-time national champion and national record holder.

== Biography ==
A member of IK Falken, she was predominantly a 1500 metres runner before transitioning to include longer distances. She competed at the 2022 World Athletics Championships in Eugene in the 1500 metres, running a time of 4:11.98.

In 2022, she finished eighth in the U23 race at the 2022 European Cross Country Championships in Turin. In December 2023 she won the bronze medal at the 2023 European Cross Country Championships in the under-23 age category.

She won the Finnish national indoor 3000 meters title in February 2024 in Tampere, but missed the 2024 World Indoors Championships due to illness. She ran a personal best 4:06.93 for the 1500 metres at the 2023 World Athletics Championships in Budapest. In the spring of the following year she lowered that personal best mark to 4:06.23, in Germany.

In April 2024, she set a new 5000 metres personal best in Walnut running 14:59.70. In May 2024, Blomqvist broke the national record in the 3000 meters whilst competing in the 2024 Diamond League event in Oslo. Blomqvist's time of 8:32.23 improved more than nine seconds on the time set by Päivi Tikkanen in 1991 in Tokyo.

She finished fifth at the 2024 European Athletics Championships in Rome in the 5000 metres in a time of 14:44.72, a new national record. Later that month she won the Finnish national 5000m title. Competing at the 2024 Olympic Games, she qualified for the final of the 5000 metres, where she finished in 13th place.

On 1 March 2026, she was a second to Ilona Mononen in the 3000, running 8:58.33, at the Finish Indoor Championships in Espoo. In August, she competed at the 2026 European Athletics Championships in Birmingham, England, in the 5000 metres.

== Personal life ==
Blomqvist is in a relationship with Finnish-Somali long-distance runner Mustafe Muuse.
