= Matilda Bogdanoff =

Finnish hurdler

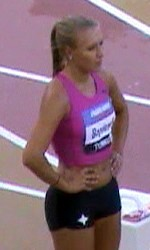
- Bogdanoff competing in Finland in 2013

Personal information
- Full name: Aleksiina Laura Matilda Bogdanoff
- Born: 8 October 1990 (age 35)
- Education: University of Helsinki
- Height: 1.68 m (5 ft 6 in)
- Weight: 62 kg (137 lb)

Sport
- Country: Finland
- Sport: Track and field
- Event: Hurdles

Matilda Bogdanoff (born 8 October 1990) is a Finnish hurdler. She competed in the 60 metres hurdles event at the 2014 IAAF World Indoor Championships.
