= Kristiina Halonen =

Finnish hurdler

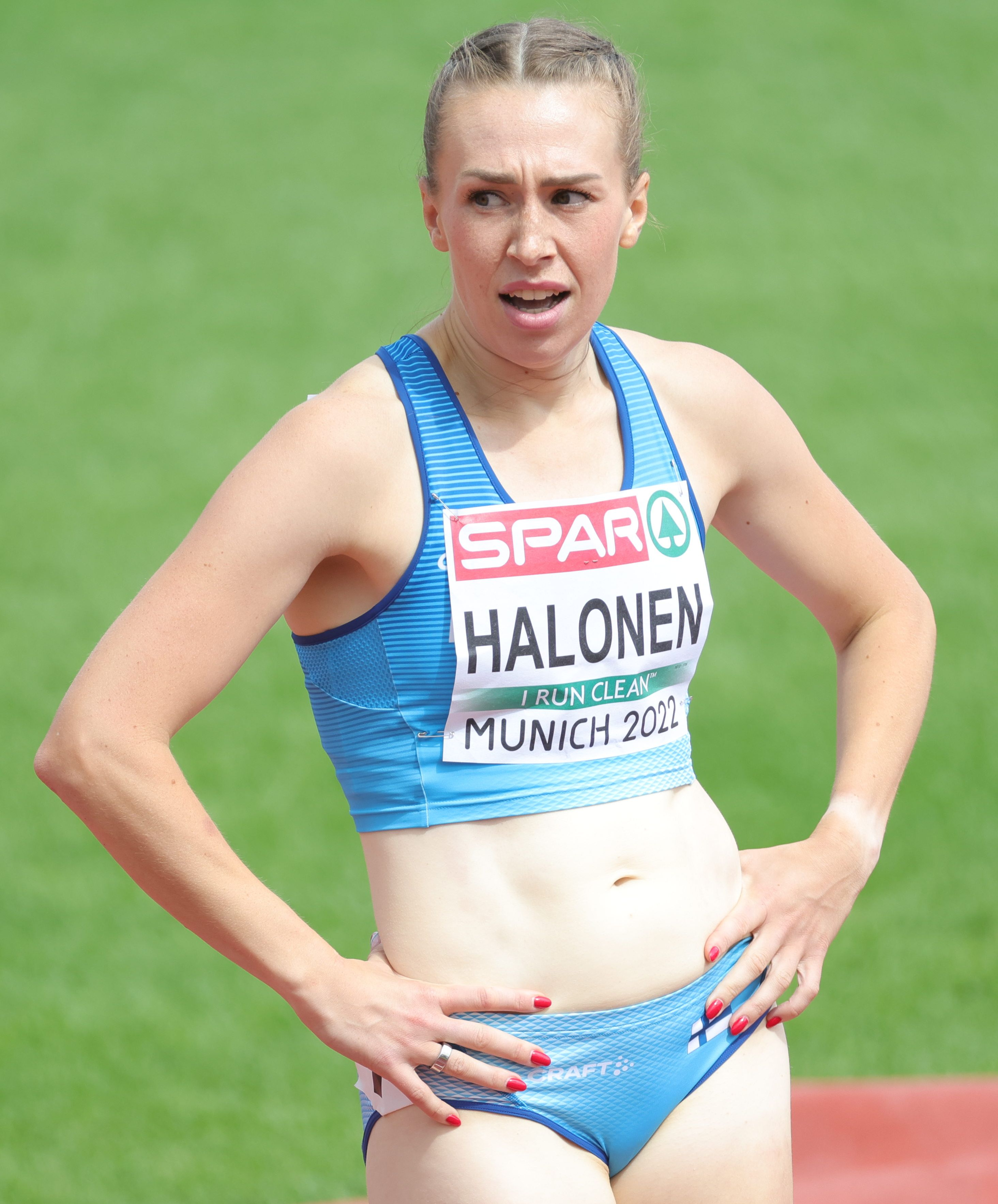
Halonen at the 2022 European Championships.

Kristiina Halonen (born 10 October 1997) is a Finnish hurdler who specializes in the 400 metres hurdles. She has competed in two World Championships and two European Championships.

== Career ==
She began running the 400 metres hurdles in 2015, finishing fifth at the Finnish Championships. Her first Finland–Sweden International took place in 2019, where she finished second, both in the 400 hurdles and in the relay; she also became Finnish U23 champion in 2019.

Her personal best time of 58.41 from the 2019 Finland–Sweden meet was not improved until 2022, but that year her season's debut was 57.04 seconds at the Tampere Games. She won the Finnish Championships in a time of 56.76. She qualified for the 2022 World Championships, where she improved again to 56.68, but did not progress past the heats. At the subsequent European Championships she ran in 56.70 and 56.82, reaching the semi-final. In addition she ran the 4 × 400 metres relay, and later in the season took another second place at the Finland–Sweden International.

Her season's best in 2023 was 57.00 seconds, and she ran in 57.01 as she only managed a bronze medal at the national championships. Reaching new heights in 2024, Halonen started the outdoor season in May with back-to-back personal bests, first 56.93 in Espoo and then 55.99 in Malmö. Qualifying for the 2024 European Championships, another personal best followed in the heat, 55.62 seconds, before she was eliminated in the semi-final with a time of 55.83. Repeating the exact same time in the Finnish Championships, she took the silver medal. She hoped to qualify for the 2024 Olympic Games through ranking, but it did not happen.

In May 2025 she lowered her personal best again, this time to 55.32 seconds, at the Kip Keino Classic. Following two second places at the Finnish Championships and Finland–Sweden International, she ran in the vicinity of her top level at the 2025 World Championships, but 55.42 seconds was not enough to progress from the heat.

== Personal life ==
She represents the club Lappeenrannan Urheilu-Miehet in Lappeenranta. She holds a diploma as an engineer.
