= Ville Myllymäki =

Finnish sprinter (born 1990)

Ville Myllymäki (born 15 January 1990) is a Finnish sprinter who specialized in the 100 metres, 200 metres and 4 × 100 metres relay. He competed at three European Championships, one European Indoor Championships, won three Finnish titles and four indoor titles.

== Career ==
In his early career he competed in relay at the 2009 European Junior Championships without reaching the final. He became the 2011 Finnish U23 indoor champion, followed by his debut in relay at the 2011 European Team Championships First League, as well as the Finland–Sweden International, being disqualified at the latter event.

Another Finnish U23 indoor championship followed, as well as a double Finnish U23 outdoor title in 2012. At the Finland–Sweden International that year he competed in three events, and also competed on the relay team at the 2012 European Championships without reaching the final. In 2013 he took his first senior Finnish indoor title, in the 200 metres, followed by another in the 60 metres in 2014. He ran the relay at the 2014 European Team Championships First League, 2014 European Championships and the Finland–Sweden International. Myllymäki was also selected to represent Finland individually at the 2014 European Championships, but the federation did not accept his qualifying race because only two European countries had been present in it.

Taking his third Finnish indoor title in a row in 2015, Myllymäki ran the 60 metres in 6.70 seconds. This entailed qualification to the 2015 European Indoor Championships, where he ran in 6.72 to go through to the semi-final before being eliminated. Having run the relay at the 2015 European Team Championships Super League, Myllymäki went on to become Finnish 100 metres champion in a personal best time of 10.39 seconds. He did not match this performance at the Finland–Sweden International, however, where he ended last in 10.78 seconds.

In 2016, Myllymäki won his fourth and last Finnish indoor title (200 m) and his second outdoor title (100 m), the latter in another personal best of 10.38. He was the fastest winner of the Finnish 100 metres title since Markus Pöyhönen in 2003. He ran the relay at the 2016 European Championships, again without reaching the final, but won the event at the Finland–Sweden International, where he also competed in two individual sprints. Moreover, the Finnish team won in a new national record of 39.25 seconds. In addition, during this season Myllymäki set a lifetime best in the 200 metres, clocking in 21.40 seconds in Lappeenranta.

Having failed to qualify for the 2017 European Indoor Championships, Myllymäki took the Finnish championship bronze in 10.47 and competed at the 2017 Summer Universiade without reaching the final. He again ran the relay at the 2017 European Team Championships First League and finished seventh in that event at the 2017 Summer Universiade. His last international competition was the 2019 IAAF World Relays, whereas he managed to win the 2021 Finnish championships in a 10.64-second race. He last raced in 2023.

He hails from Kankaanpää and represented the club Kankaanpää Seudun Leisku. After his sprinting career he worked in an accounting firm.
