= Henri Liipola =

Finnish athlete (born 1994)

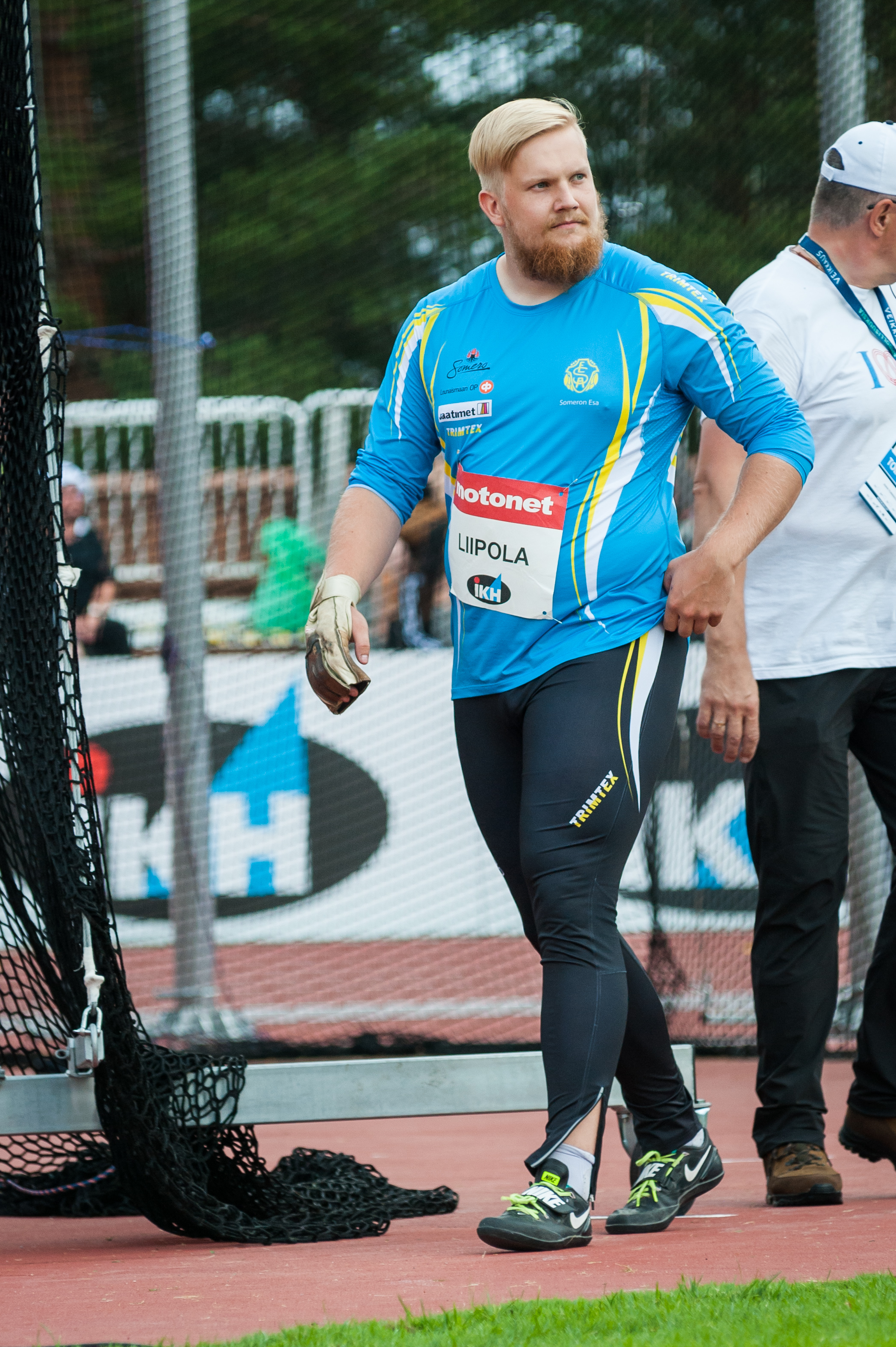
- Liipola in 2018

Personal information
- Born: 24 April 1994 (age 32)

Sport
- Sport: Athletics
- Event: Hammer throw

Achievements and titles
- Personal best: Hammer: 75.47m (2018)

Henri Liipola (born 24 April 1994) is a Finnish hammer thrower. He is a multiple-time national champion.

== Biography ==
Liipola threw a personal best of 75.47 metres at the hammer carnival in Kaustinen at the end of June in 2018, and made his major championship debut at the 2018 European Athletics Championships in Berlin, Germany. The following year, he represented Finland at the 2019 European Throwing Cup.

He competed at the 2022 European Athletics Championships in Munich, Germany.

He won his fifth senior national title in August 2025 at the Finnish Athletics Championships with a throw of 74.83 metres. He threw 73.12 metres to win at the Finnkampen in Stockholm on 22 August. In September 2025, he competed in the hammer throw at the 2025 World Championships in Tokyo, Japan, without qualifying for the final.

In August 2026, he competed at the 2026 European Athletics Championships in Birmingham, England, in the hammer throw.

== Personal life ==
He is from Turku. In 2024, he revealed he had been diagnosed with sleep apnea.
