= Alisa Vainio =

Finnish long-distance runner (born 1997)

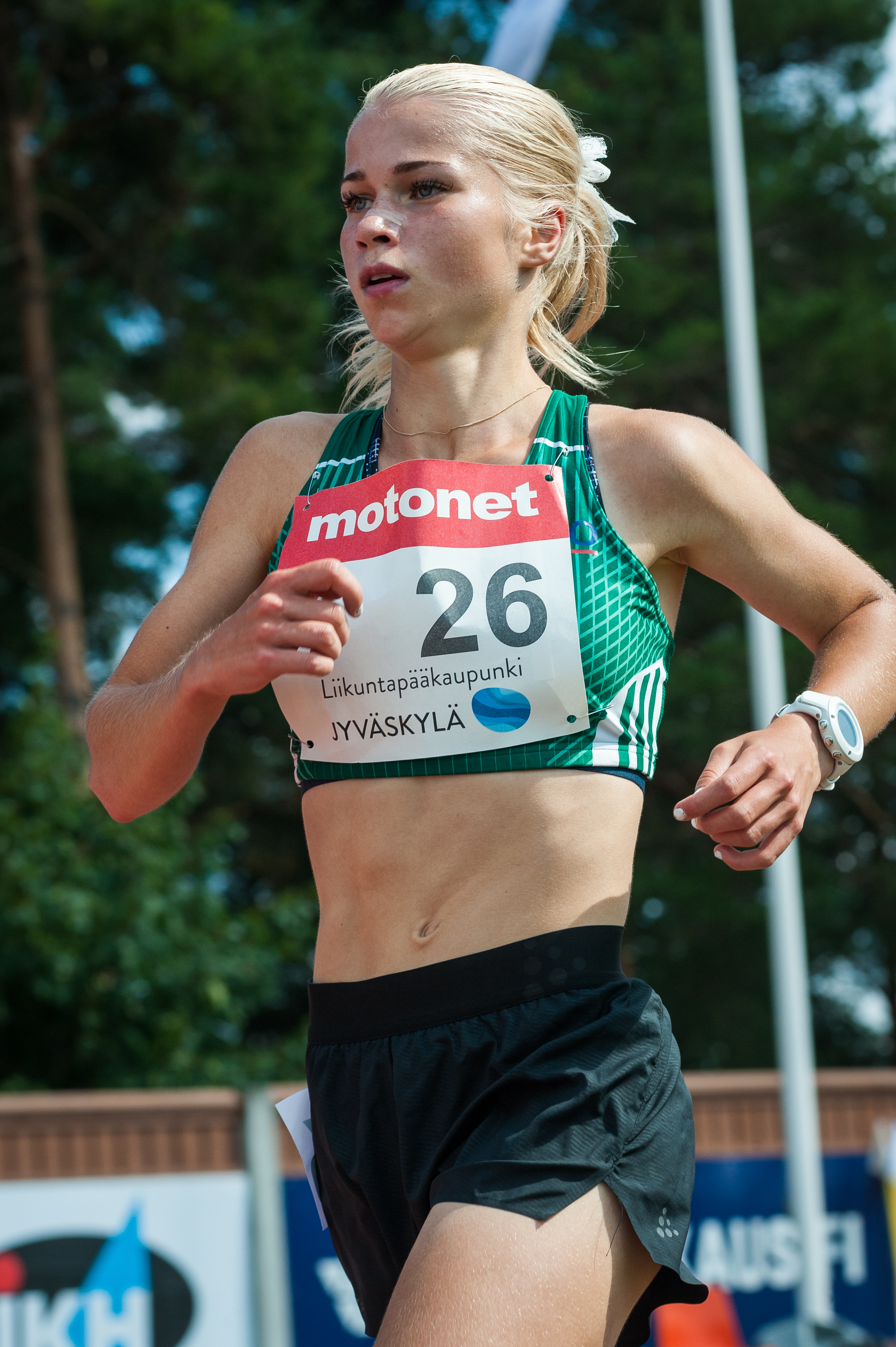
- Alisa Vainio at the 2018 Finnish Championships in Athletics

Personal information
- Full name: Alisa Pauliina Vainio
- Nationality: Finnish
- Born: November 16, 1997 (age 28) Lappeenranta, Finland
- Height: 1.63 m (5 ft 4 in)
- Weight: 43 kg (95 lb)

Sport
- Country: Finland
- Sport: Athletics
- Event: Long-distance running
- Club: Lappeenrannan Urheilu-Miehet
- Coached by: Jarmo Viskari

Achievements and titles
- Personal bests: 3,000 m st: 10:02.45 (2015); 5,000 m: 15:51.94 (2018); 10,000 m: 32:30.71 (2026); Marathon: 2:20:39 (2026 NR)
Medal record
Representing Finland
Women's athletics
European Championships
Gold medal – first place	2026 Birmingham	Marathon
European Junior Championships
Bronze medal – third place	2015 Eskilstuna	3000 m steeplechase

Alisa Vainio
Sport
- Country: Finland
- Sport: Bandy
Medal record
Representing Finland
Women's bandy
Women's Bandy World Championship
Bronze medal – third place	2012 Irkutsk
Bronze medal – third place	2014 Lappeenranta

Alisa Pauliina Vainio (born 16 November 1997) is a Finnish long-distance runner. Vainio is a national record holder on marathon (2:20:39, set at Seville Marathon in 2026) and half-marathon (1:09:30, set at Copenhagen Marathon in 2024). Vainio won the marathon gold medal at the 2026 European Championships in Birmingham, England, setting a new championship record time of 2:22:26 in the process.

Vainio won bronze at the 2015 European Athletics Junior Championships in 3,000m steeplechase. She has two Finnish championships from 10,000m (2015 and 2018) and one from the marathon (2018). At the 2025 World Athletics Championships women's marathon in Tokyo, Vainio finished fifth as the best European athlete. Vainio also has two world championship bronze-medals from bandy at the Irkutsk 2012 and Lappeenranta 2014.

Alisa Vainio is not related to former long-distance runner Martti Vainio and their family names have different origins.

== National titles ==
- Finnish Marathon Championships
  - (gold) : 2018, 2025, 2026
- Finnish Road Running Championships
  - (gold) : 2022, 2023, 2024
