= Eveliina Määttänen =

Finnish athlete (born 1995)

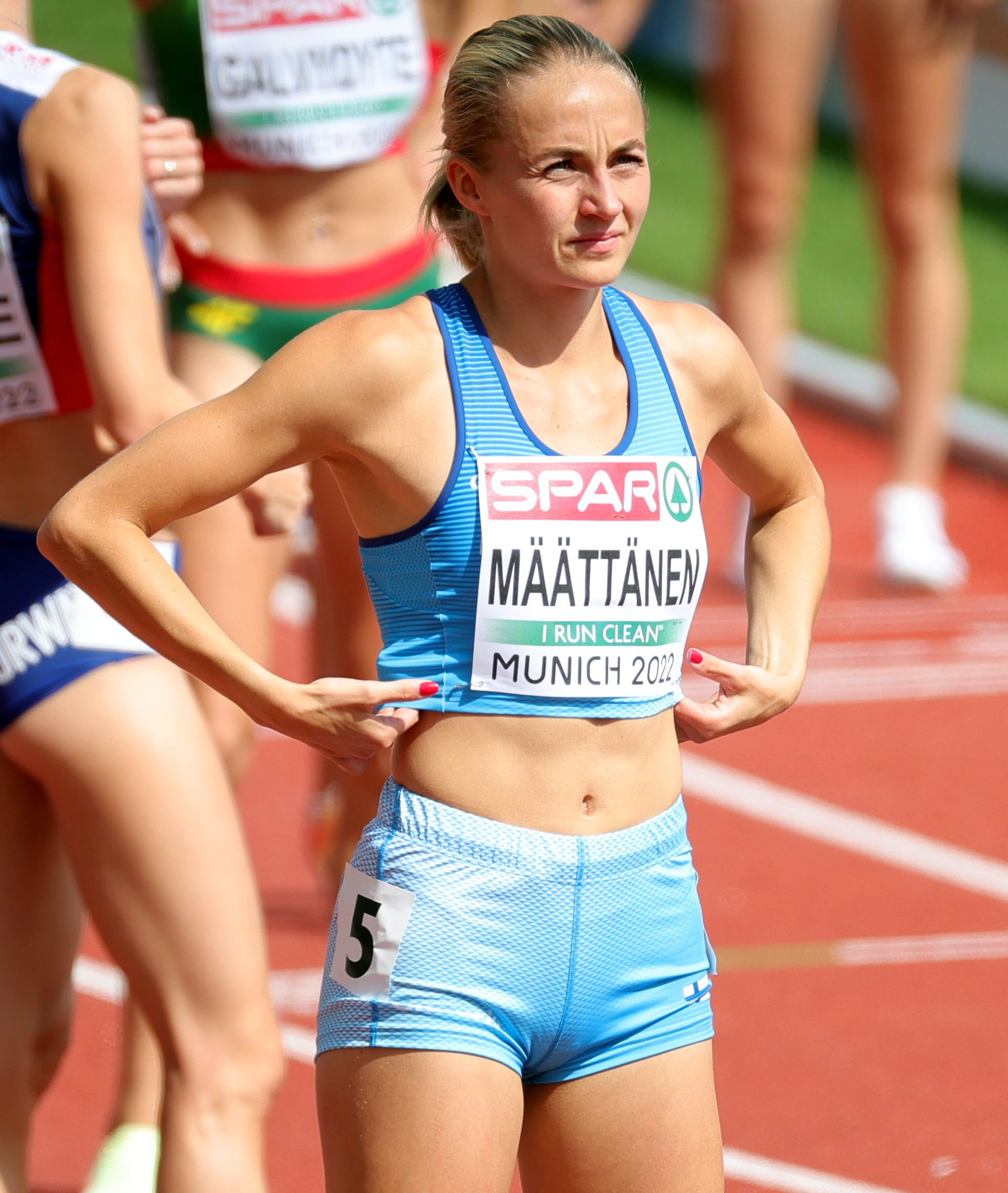

Personal information
- Nationality: Finnish
- Born: 1 September 1995 (age 31)

Sport
- Sport: Athletics
- Event: 800 metres

Achievements and titles
- Personal best: 800m: 1:59.81 (Budapest 2023)

Eveliina Määttänen (born 1 September 1995) is a track and field athlete from Finland who has won multiple national championships titles, predominantly over 800 metres. She competed at the 2024 Olympic Games.

== Biography ==
She won the Finnish Indoor Athletics Championships in February 2022 over 800 metres. Competing outdoors, she won the Finnish Athletics Championships in June 2022 over 800 metres, running a time of 2:03.60. Määttänen subsequently participated in the 800 metres at the 2022 World Athletics Championships in Eugene, Oregon. In the same year she also competed in the 800 metres at the European Athletics Championships in Munich.

In 2023, she participated in the World Championships in Budapest, and qualified from the heats for the semi-final of the 800 metres in a time of 2:00.41.

She competed for Finland at the 2024 World Athletics Indoor Championships – Women's 800 metres in Glasgow. She finished third in the 800 metres at the 2024 BAUHAUS-galan in Stockholm on 2 June 2024. She was named in the Finnish team for the 2024 European Athletics Championships in Rome, Italy, where she finished second in her heat to reach the semi-finals but did not progress to the final. She competed in the 800 metres at the 2024 Summer Olympics in Paris in August 2024. She ran 2:00.97 in her qualifying round and ran in the repechage round but did not qualify for the semi-finals.

She won her qualifying heat at the 2025 European Athletics Indoor Championships in Apeldoorn in 2:02.73. However, she did not progress from the semi-final stage. In September, she competed in the women's 800 metres at the 2025 World Athletics Championships in Tokyo, Japan.

In August, she competed at the 2026 European Athletics Championships in Birmingham, England, in the women's 800 metres.

== Personal life ==
From Kerava, she graduated as a pharmacist in 2019 and works in a pharmacy in addition to sports. She is married to Slovenian athlete Jan Petrac. Her brother, Jaakko Määttänen, is also an international athlete. He has represented Finland as a race walker.
