= Jonathan Åstrand =

Finnish sprinter

Jonathan Åstrand (born 9 September 1985 in Närpes, Finland) is a Finnish sprinter. At the 2012 Summer Olympics, he competed in the Men's 200 metres. He has a personal best of 10.26 in the 100 meters and 20.50 in the 200 metres.
