= Finland–Sweden Athletics International =

Yearly international athletics competition held between Sweden and Finland

Finland–Sweden athletics international
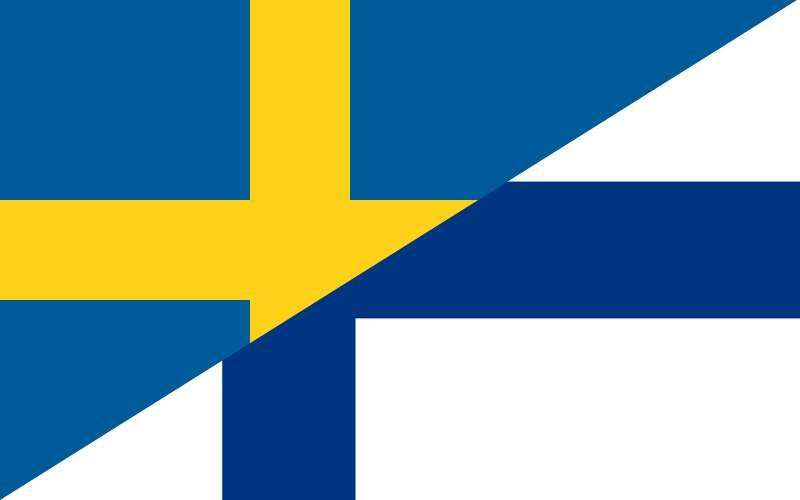
- Sport: Athletics
- First season: 1925
- No. of teams: 2
- Countries: Finland; Sweden
- Most recent champions: Men: Finland; Women: Sweden
- Most titles: Men: Finland (48); Women: Sweden (45)
- Website: www.ruotsiottelu.fi (in Finnish) www.finnkampen.se (in Swedish)

A yearly international athletics competition, known as Suomi–Ruotsi-maaottelu (English: The Finland–Sweden match) or Ruotsi-ottelu (The Sweden Battle) in Finnish, Sverigekampen (The Sweden Battle) in Finland Swedish and Finnkampen (The Finn Battle) in Sweden Swedish, is held between Finland and Sweden since 1925.

It is (since the late 1980s) the only annual athletics international with only two participating countries still held at a professional level. The two-day event attracts significant audiences, with a combined total of over 50,000 tickets sold for the 2011 competition.

== Competition ==
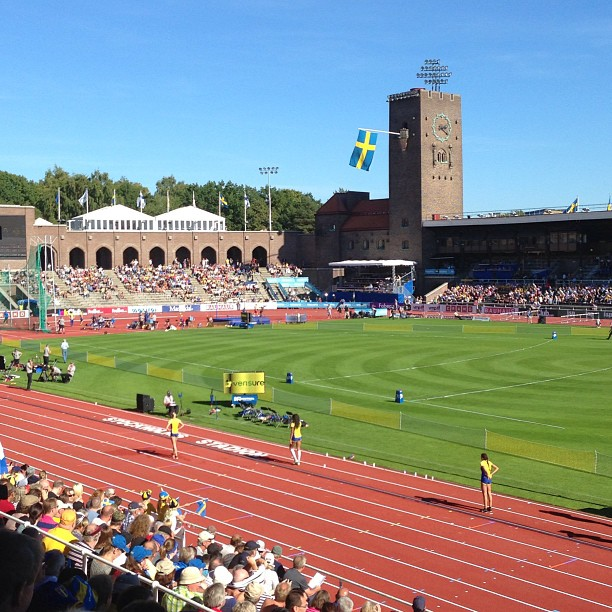
2013 Finland–Sweden international in Stockholm

The competition is actually divided into two internationals, one for men and one for women. Youth competitions for boys and girls are also held. Each country provides their three best participants in each of the events, except for the relays where there are four participants (one team) from each country. Traditionally, the competitions have been arranged alternatively, with Finland hosting in even years and Sweden in odd years. This has changed few times in recent years, seeing one country arranging the international twice in a row a few times. The reasons for this include stadium renovations and major international competitions. Points are given to all contestants completing their event (no points are given to athletes who are disqualified, do not finish the event or don't get the result in field competitions), based on the final position in every event. Points given in each event are, from 1st to 6th place: 7–5–4–3–2–1, and in relays 1st and 2nd place are awarded with 5 and 2 points.

The competition may not be a world class one looking at the results, no single world record has been set, but there are few competitions in the world that are fiercer and more prestigious. This is most often seen in the middle-distance running, where tactics are more important than time, and these events have seen many foul tricks during the years, in 1992 resulting in the disqualification of all six runners in the men's 1500 metres event.

Another important aspect of the event is that it is a team competition. A competitor who manages to reach fourth place instead of a projected sixth place can be just as important, or even more important, for the result as a "star" that secures the expected first place. A fight to the finish between competitor number five and six, half a lap behind the winner, can be just as important as the actual winner. The race is not over until the last competitor crosses the line. For many of the competitors the international is the most prestigious competition of the year.

The events in Finland have always been held in Helsinki, after 1939 at the Helsinki Olympic Stadium, but 2016 and 2018 events took place at Ratina Stadium in Tampere due to renovation of the Olympic Stadium. The Swedish events have mostly been held in Stockholm at the Stockholm Olympic Stadium. From 1999 until 2012 they were held in Gothenburg at the Ullevi Stadium because of larger spectator capacity.

== Events ==
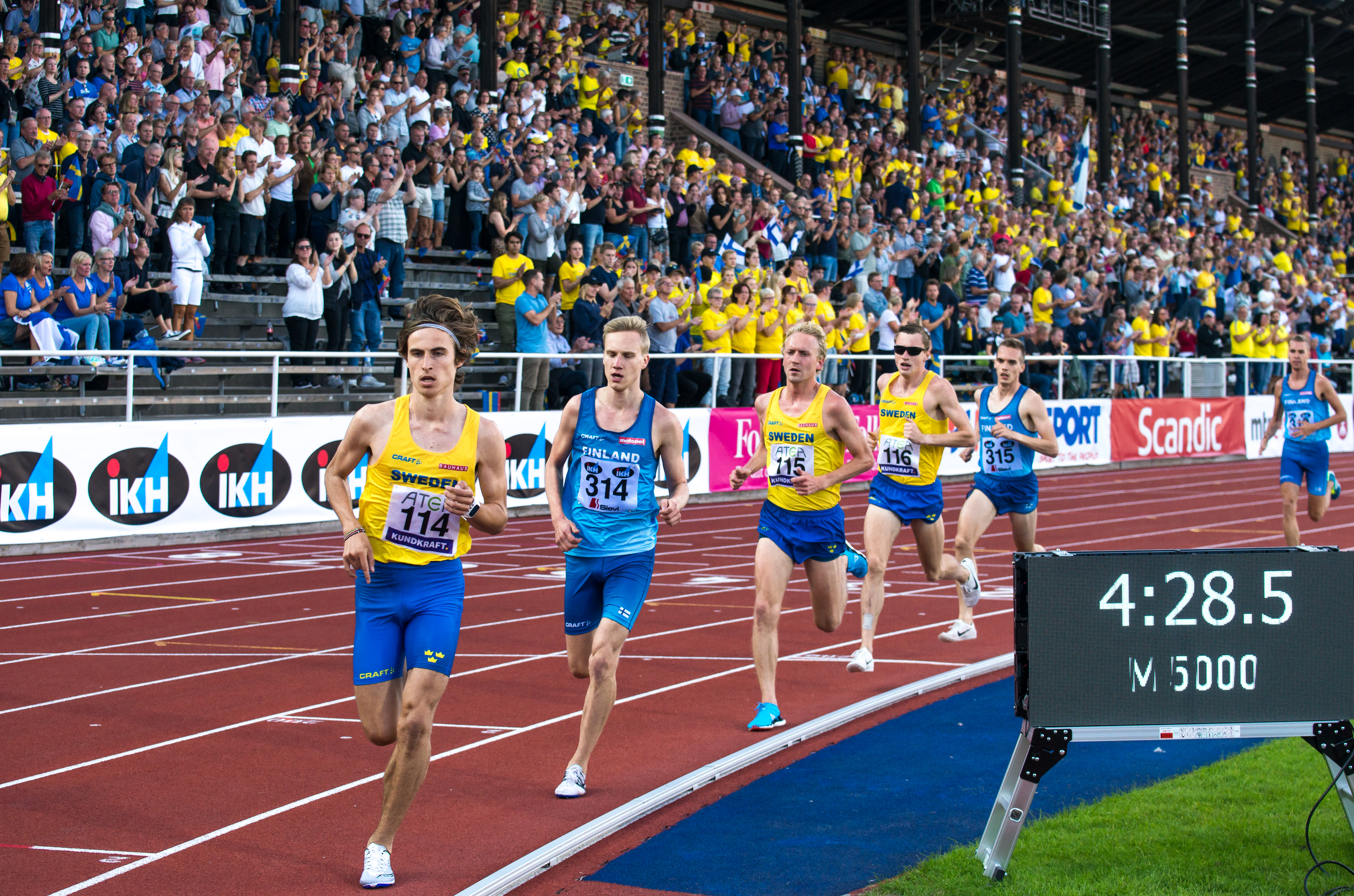
5000 metres in 2019

- 100 m
- 200 m
- 400 m
- 800 m
- 1500 m
- 5000 m
- 10000 m
- 5 km walk/10 km walk
- 4 × 100 m relay
- 4 × 400 m relay
- 100 m hurdles/110 m hurdles
- 400 m hurdles
- 3000 m steeplechase
- High jump
- Pole vault
- Long jump
- Triple jump
- Shot put
- Discus
- Hammer
- Javelin

== History ==
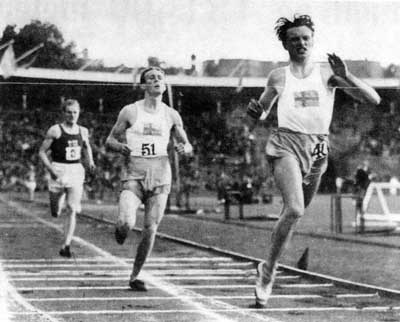
1500 meters in 1939

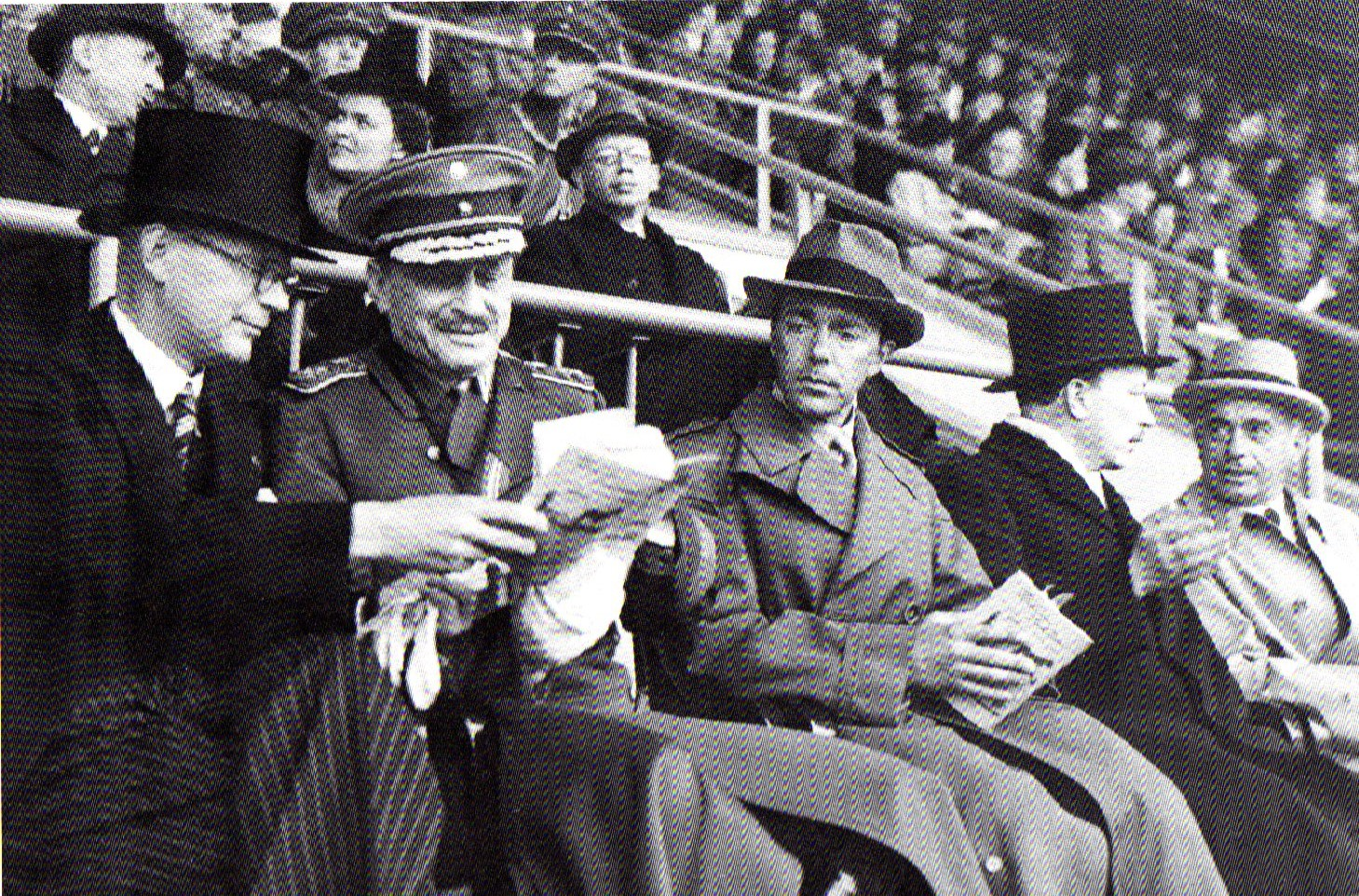
Athletics game Finland–Sweden–Germany 7.9.1940 in Helsinki, spectators from left: Urho Kekkonen, Field Marshal Mannerheim, Prince Gustaf Adolf of Sweden, President of Finland Risto Ryti and Reichssportführer Hans von Tschammer und Osten of Germany

Finnkampen was held for the first time in Helsinki in 1925, with one of the participants being the five-time Olympic champion in the 1924 Summer Olympics, Paavo Nurmi. Competitions were held in 1927, 1929 and 1931. After a pause of eight years the next competition was held in 1939, just before the outbreak of the Second World War, which led to the cancellation of the competition between 1941 and 1944. The 1940 competition was held as a triple event between Finland, Sweden and Germany, with only two athletes from each country competing in each event. The international has been continually held for men since 1945 and for women since 1964, although the first women's competition was held already in 1953.

=== 1931 breakup ===
The first competitions were very much influenced by the love-hate relationship between Sweden and Finland. The 1931 event was a victory for Finland, but tensions at the track led to a knuckle fight between the runners-up in the 800 metres race.

At the banquet after the games, the new chairman of the Finnish athletics union and future president of Finland, Urho Kekkonen announced that Finland would no longer take part in the event. The tension was in a large part caused by Swedish attempts, spearheaded by Sigfrid Edström, the Swedish president of the IAAF and vice-president of the IOC, to have Paavo Nurmi declared a professional athlete, and thus banned from international competitions. After Kekkonen's speech Swedish efforts intensified, and Nurmi was banned from the 1932 Summer Olympics in Los Angeles.

It took eight years until 1939, before the Finns again decided to participate in the games, at the eve of the planned 1940 Summer Olympics in Helsinki.

== Results ==
Year	Location	Winner (men)	Result	Winner (women)	Result
1925	Helsinki	Finland	99–85	–	–
1927	Stockholm	Sweden	98–86	–	–
1929	Helsinki	Sweden	93–90	–	–
1931	Stockholm	Finland	104–76	–	–
1939	Stockholm	Finland	112–102	–	–
1940	Helsinki	Sweden	111–103	–	–
1945	Stockholm	Sweden	105–79	–	–
1946	Helsinki	Sweden	114.5–68.5	–	–
1947	Gothenburg	Sweden	106–78	–	–
1948	Helsingborg	Sweden	138–76	–	–
1950	Stockholm	Sweden	123–88	–	–
1951	Helsinki	Finland	216–194	–	–
1953	Stockholm/Jyväskylä	Sweden	217–193	Sweden	58–48
1954	Helsinki/Eskilstuna	Finland	207–202	Sweden	64–42
1955	Stockholm/Valkeakoski	Finland	213–196	Sweden	58–48
1956	Helsinki	Finland	209–201	–	–
1957	Stockholm/Lahti	Finland	208–201	Sweden	64–42
1958	Helsinki/Jönköping	Finland	232–177	Sweden	66–51
1959	Gothenburg/Vammala	Finland	209–200	Sweden	64–53
1960	Helsinki/Linköping	Finland	216–194	Sweden	67–50
1961	Stockholm/Kouvola	Finland	220.5–189.5	Sweden	68.5–48.5
1962	Helsinki	Finland	219–190	–	–
1963	Stockholm	Finland	220–190	–	–
1964	Helsinki	Finland	210.5–199.5	Sweden	64–53
1965	Stockholm	Sweden	210–200	Sweden	65–52
1966	Helsinki	Sweden	208.5–199.5	Sweden	62–55
1967	Stockholm	Sweden	212–198	Sweden	66–51
1968	Helsinki	Finland	208.5–199.5	Sweden	64–52
1969	Stockholm	Sweden	212.5–195.5	Sweden	75–60
1970	Helsinki	Finland	227–182	Sweden	82–53
1971	Gothenburg	Finland	224–183	Sweden	71–64
1972	Helsinki	Finland	236.5–173.5	Finland	73–60
1973	Stockholm	Finland	223–187	Finland	77–69
1974	Helsinki	Finland	207–200	Finland	75–60
1975	Stockholm	Finland	214–191	Finland	94–62
1976	Helsinki	Finland	223–187	Finland	91–66
1977	Stockholm	Finland	212–194	Finland	86–69
1978	Helsinki	Finland	240–168	Finland	85–72
1979	Stockholm	Finland	214–194	Finland	80–77
1980	Helsinki	Finland	232–178	Sweden	79–78
1981	Stockholm	Finland	214–196	Sweden	81–75
1982	Helsinki	Finland	215–193	Sweden	79–78
1983	Stockholm	Finland	234–176	Sweden	83–74
1984	Helsinki	Finland	216–193	Finland	155–145
1985	Stockholm	Sweden	219–185	Sweden	166–156
1986	Helsinki	Sweden	210.5–198.5	Sweden	184–138
1987	Stockholm	Finland	210.5–197.5	Finland	165–157
1988	Helsinki	Finland	229.5–180.5	Finland	170–150
1989	Stockholm	Sweden	213–197	Finland	184–138
1990	Helsinki	Finland	217–193	Finland	182–140
1991	Stockholm	Sweden	226–183	Finland	197–147
1992	Helsinki	Sweden	198–187	Finland	195–149
1993	Stockholm	Sweden	215–192	Finland	198–144
1994	Stockholm	Sweden	219–190	Finland	174–170
1995	Helsinki	Finland	213–196	Finland	196–146
1996	Helsinki	Sweden	205.5–202.5	Finland	215–173
1997	Stockholm	Finland	207.5–198.5	Finland	223–165
1998	Helsinki	Finland	206–200	Finland	210–178
1999	Gothenburg	Sweden	210–198	Finland	212–175
2000	Helsinki	Sweden	216–194	Finland	219–191
2001	Gothenburg	Sweden	218–185	Sweden	213–197
2002	Helsinki	Finland	223–187	Sweden	215.5–192.5
2003	Helsinki	Finland	205–203	Sweden	208.5–201.5
2004	Gothenburg	Sweden	217–191	Sweden	228.5–178.5
2005	Gothenburg	Finland	212–197	Sweden	230–179
2006	Helsinki	Finland	204–201	Sweden	226–183
2007	Gothenburg	Finland	203–199	Sweden	219–189
2008	Helsinki	Finland	215–193	Sweden	209.5–197.5
2009	Gothenburg	Sweden	208–200	Sweden	213–197
2010	Helsinki	Finland	214–195	Sweden	226–182
2011	Helsinki	Finland	206–194	Sweden	225–182
2012	Gothenburg	Sweden	220–187	Finland	223–187
2013	Stockholm	Sweden	235–173	Sweden	215–195
2014	Helsinki	Sweden	216–193	Sweden	206–204
2015	Stockholm	Sweden	231–179	Finland	213.5–193.5
2016	Tampere	Sweden	210–200	Sweden	213–197
2017	Stockholm	Sweden	216–188	Sweden	232.5–177.5
2018	Tampere	Finland	206–202	Sweden	216–194
2019	Stockholm	Sweden	228–181	Sweden	217.5–192.5
2020	Tampere	Sweden	206–201	Sweden	221–186
2021	Stockholm	Sweden	230–201	Sweden	223.5–207.5
2022	Helsinki	Sweden	227.5–204.5	Sweden	225.5–205.5
2023	Stockholm	Sweden	227–227	Sweden	228.5–225.5
2024	Helsinki	Finland	228–225	Finland	229.5–224.5
2025	Stockholm	Sweden	252–201	Sweden	242.5–211.5
2026	Helsinki	Finland	227–225	Sweden	230–222

=== Totals ===
- Men:

Finland 48 – 38 Sweden

- Women:

Finland 26 – 45 Sweden

- Total:

Finland 74 – 83 Sweden

== Competition records ==
=== Men ===
Event	Record	Athlete	Nationality	Date	Place	Ref
100 m	10.19	Peter Karlsson	Sweden	1996	Helsinki, Finland	
200 m	20.47	Johan Wissman	Sweden	2007	Gothenburg, Sweden	
400 m	45.79	Markku Kukkoaho	Finland	1974	Helsinki, Finland	
800 m	1:44.5	Pekka Vasala	Finland	1972	Helsinki, Finland	
1500 m	3:36.06	Samuel Pihlström	Sweden	3 September 2023	Stockholm, Sweden	
5000 m	13:29.26	Andreas Almgren	Sweden	4 September 2021	Stockholm, Sweden	
10000 m	28:04.86	Martti Vainio	Finland	1978	Helsinki, Finland	
3000 m steeplechase	8:20.8	Anders Gärderud	Sweden	1974	Helsinki, Finland	
110 m hurdles	13.44	Robert Kronberg	Sweden	2000	Helsinki, Finland	
400 m hurdles	48.86	Niklas Wallenlind	Sweden	1992	Helsinki, Finland	
High jump	2.35 m	Stefan Holm	Sweden	2004	Gothenburg, Sweden	
Pole vault	6.00 m	Armand Duplantis	Sweden	24 August 2019	Stockholm, Sweden	
Long jump	8.24 m (+0.4 m/s)	Thobias Montler	Sweden	5 September 2021	Stockholm, Sweden	
Triple jump	17.51 m	Christian Olsson	Sweden	2003	Helsinki, Finland	
Shot put	20.86 m	Reijo Ståhlberg	Finland	1978	Helsinki, Finland	
Discus throw	69.42 m	Daniel Ståhl	Sweden	25 August 2019	Stockholm, Sweden	
Hammer throw	79.35 m	Olli-Pekka Karjalainen	Finland	2002	Helsinki, Finland	
Javelin throw	89.36 m	Seppo Räty	Finland	1990	Helsinki, Finland	
10000 m walk (track)	38:03.95	Perseus Karlström	Sweden	24 August 2019	Stockholm, Sweden	
4 × 100 m relay	39.27		Sweden	24 August 1996	Helsinki, Finland	
4 × 400 m relay	3:05.81	Emil Johansson; Anders Pihlblad; Andreas Kramer; Nick Ekelund-Arenander	Sweden	5 September 2021	Stockholm, Sweden	

=== Women ===
Event	Record	Athlete	Nationality	Date	Place	Ref
100 m	11.31	Linda Haglund	Sweden	1978	Helsinki, Finland	
200 m	22.95	Irene Ekelund	Sweden	2013	Stockholm, Sweden	
400 m	50.78	Riitta Salin	Finland	1974	Helsinki, Finland	
800 m	2:00.50	Malin Ewerlöf	Sweden	1998	Helsinki, Finland	
1500 m	4:09.32	Sara Kuivisto	Finland	3 September 2023	Stockholm, Sweden	
5000 m	15:14.09	Sarah Lahti	Sweden	3 September 2023	Stockholm, Sweden	
10000 m	31:57.15	Midde Hamrin	Sweden	1990	Helsinki, Finland	
10 km (road)	32:32	Sarah Lahti	Sweden	2 September 2023	Stockholm, Sweden	
3000 m steeplechase	9:33.25	Emilia Lillemo	Sweden	3 September 2023	Stockholm, Sweden	
100 m hurdles	12.80	Susanna Kallur	Sweden	2007	Gothenburg, Sweden	
400 m hurdles	54.58	Anne-Louise Skoglund	Sweden	1986	Helsinki, Finland	
High jump	2.01 m	Kajsa Bergqvist	Sweden	2002	Helsinki, Finland	
Pole vault	4.66 m	Wilma Heltelä	Finland	29 August 2026	Helsinki, Finland	
Long jump	6.82 m	Ringa Ropo-Junnila	Finland	1989	Stockholm, Sweden	
Triple jump	14.34 m	Heli Koivula	Finland	2002	Helsinki, Finland	
Shot put	18.65 m	Fanny Roos	Sweden	4 September 2021	Stockholm, Sweden	
Discus throw	63.46 m	Vanessa Kamga	Sweden	30 August 2024	Helsinki, Finland	
Hammer throw	73.09 m	Krista Tervo	Finland	3 September 2023	Stockholm, Sweden	
Javelin throw	63.56 m	Paula Tarvainen	Finland	2006	Helsinki, Finland	
5000 m walk (track)	20:54.62	Sari Essayah	Finland	1995	Helsinki, Finland	
4 × 100 m relay	43.61	Emma Rienas; Carolina Klüft; Jenny Kallur; Susanna Kallur	Sweden	2005	Gothenburg, Sweden	
4 × 400 m relay	3:33:30		Sweden	2002	Helsinki, Finland	
