= Finnish Athletics Federation =

Governing body of athletics in Finland

- Suomen Urheiluliitto
- Finlands Friidrottsförbund
- Sport: Athletics
- Abbreviation: SUL
- Founded: 1932
- Affiliation: World Athletics
- Regional affiliation: EAA
- Headquarters: Helsinki, Finland
- President: Sami Itani
- Secretary: Harri Aalto

Official website
- www.yleisurheilu.fi
- (Finland)

Finnish Athletics Federation (Finnish: Suomen Urheiluliitto ry, abbr. SUL; Swedish: Finlands Friidrottsförbund rf) is the governing body of athletics in Finland. It was separated from the Finnish Gymnastics and Sports Federation in 1932.

Today SUL has 850 member clubs and some 30,000 athletes. It is a member of Finnish Sports Federation which is the main governing body of Sport in Finland.

== Presidents ==
- Urho Kekkonen 1932–1947
- Lauri Miettinen 1948–1952
- Reino Piirto 1953–1963
- Toimi Tulikoura 1964
- Jukka Uunila 1965–1974
- Yrjö Kokko 1975–1976
- Carl-Olaf Homén 1977–1980
- Pertti Eräkare 1981–1982
- Tapani Ilkka 1983–1990
- Ilkka Kanerva 1991–2005
- Antti Pihlakoski 2006–2012
- Vesa Harmaakorpi 2013–2018
- Sami Itani 2019–
