= Finland at the 2012 European Athletics Championships =

Finland was represented by 53 athletes at the 2012 European Athletics Championships in Helsinki, Finland.

== Medals ==
Medal	Name	Event	Date
Bronze	Ari Mannio	Men's javelin throw	28 June

== Results ==
=== Men ===
==== Track ====
Event	Athletes	Heats		Semifinal		Final	
Event	Athletes	Result	Rank	Result	Rank	Result	Rank
100 m	Eetu Rantala	10.73	29	did not advance			
200 m	Jonathan Åstrand	21.20	21 Q	21.27	17	did not advance	
400 m	Ville Wendelin	Disqualified		did not advance			
800 m	Tommy Granlund	1:50.12	33	did not advance			
1500 m	Niclas Sandells	3:45.74	11 Q	—N/a		4:03.34	12
10,000 m	Jarkko Järvenpää	—N/a				30:59.63	22
110 m hurdles	Joona-Ville Heinä	14.21	31	did not advance			
400 m hurdles	Jussi Heikkilä	52.95	35	did not advance			
400 m hurdles	Oskari Mörö	51.59	26	did not advance			
400 m hurdles	Petteri Monni	51.73	28	did not advance			
3000 m steeplechase	Jukka Keskisalo	did not start		—N/a		did not advance	
4 x 100 m relay	Eetu Rantala; Visa Hongisto; Jonathan Åstrand; Ville Myllymäki	39.85	10	—N/a		did not advance	
4 x 400 m relay	Petteri Monni; Ville Wendelin; Oskari Mörö; Jani Koskela	3:10.26	12	—N/a		did not advance	

==== Combined ====
Decathlon	Event	Sami Itani		
Decathlon	Event	Results	Points	Rank
	100 m	11.19	819	19
	Long jump	6.84	776	20
	Shot put	14.07	733	10
	High jump	2.00	803	3
	400 m	50.01	814	19
	110 m hurdles	14.89	863	19
	Discus	41.20	689	9
	Pole vault	4.40	731	18
	Javelin	56.65	688	8
	1500 m	4:53.28	599	17
Final			7515	17

==== Field ====
Event	Athletes	Qualification		Final	
Event	Athletes	Result	Rank	Result	Rank
Long jump	Tommi Evilä	8.01	6 q	7.79	10
Long jump	Mikko Kivinen	7.69	23	did not advance	
Long jump	Roni Ollikainen	8.00	7 q	8.05	6
Triple jump	Aleksi Tammentie	16.32	14	did not advance	
High jump	Osku Torro	2.19	18	did not advance	
Pole vault	Jere Bergius	5.30	18	did not advance	
Pole vault	Eemeli Salomäki	5.30	16	did not advance	
Discus throw	Mikko Kyyrö	60.16	20	did not advance	
Javelin throw	Ari Mannio	84.31	1 Q	82.63	3rd place, bronze medalist(s)
Javelin throw	Tero Pitkämäki	80.66	6 q	74.89	11
Javelin throw	Teemu Wirkkala	No mark		did not advance	
Hammer throw	Olli-Pekka Karjalainen	74.54	4 q	73.48	10
Hammer throw	Tuomas Seppänen	71.15	20	did not advance	
Hammer throw	David Söderberg	No mark		did not advance	

=== Women ===
==== Track ====
Event	Athletes	Heats		Semifinal		Final	
Event	Athletes	Result	Rank	Result	Rank	Result	Rank
100 m	Hanna-Maari Latvala	11.67	26	did not advance			
200 m	Anna Hämäläinen	24.14	27	did not advance			
400 m	Ella Räsänen	54.52	25	did not advance			
800 m	Suvi Selvenius	2:06.39	17	—N/a		did not advance	
1500 m	Johanna Lehtinen	4:14.83	18	—N/a		did not advance	
5000 m	Johanna Lehtinen	—N/a				did not finish	
100 m hurdles	Elisa Leinonen	13.29	19	did not advance			
100 m hurdles	Nooralotta Neziri	13.23	17	did not advance			
400 m hurdles	Emma Millard	57.61	18	did not advance			
3000 m steeplechase	Sandra Eriksson	9:55.58	15 q	—N/a		9:48.19	10
4 x 100 m relay	Maria Räsänen; Noora Hämäläinen; Minna Laukka; Hanna-Maari Latvala	44.65	12	—N/a		did not advance	
4 x 400 m relay	Jenni Kivioja; Ella Räsänen; Ilona Punkkinen; Emma Millard	3:40.97	15	—N/a		did not advance	

==== Combined ====
Heptathlon	Event	Niina Kelo		
Heptathlon	Event	Results	Points	Rank
	100 m hurdles	14.35	929	18
	High jump	1.65	795	18
	Shot Put	12.56	698	15
	200 m	24.10	971	1
	Long jump	6.18	905	8
	Javelin throw	45.38	771	9
	800 m	DNS		
Final			DNF	

==== Field ====
Event	Athletes	Qualification		Final	
Event	Athletes	Result	Rank	Result	Rank
High jump	Elina Smolander	1.78	22	did not advance	
Triple jump	Kristiina Mäkelä	No mark		did not advance	
Pole vault	Minna Nikkanen	4.25	19	did not advance	
Shot put	Suvi Helin	15.05	18	did not advance	
Discus throw	Sanna Kämäräinen	52.21	21	did not advance	
Discus throw	Tanja Komulainen	53.52	19	did not advance	
Javelin throw	Oona Sormunen	54.66	14	did not advance	
Javelin throw	Sanni Utriainen	58.70	6 q	55.14	11
Hammer throw	Merja Korpela	64.03	19	did not advance	
