= Finland at the 2010 European Athletics Championships =

Sporting event delegation

Finland will be represented by 39 athletes at the 2010 European Athletics Championships held in Barcelona, Spain.

== Participants ==
Event	Men	Women
100 m	Hannu Hämäläinen; Joni Rautanen	
200 m	Jonathan Åstrand	
800 m	Mikko Lahtio	
1500 m	Mikael Bergdahl; Jonas Hamm; Niclas Sandells	
5000 m	Matti Räsänen; Jussi Utriainen	
10000 m	Matti Räsänen; Jussi Utriainen	
3000 st.	Joonas Harjamäki; Jukka Keskisalo; Janne Ukonmaanaho	Sandra Eriksson
110 m hurdles	Juha Sonck	
400 m hurdles	Jussi Heikkilä	Ilona Ranta
50 km walk	Jarkko Kinnunen	
High Jump	Osku Torro	
Pole Vault	Vesa Rantanen; Eemeli Salomäki	Minna Nikkanen
Long Jump	Tommi Evilä; Otto Kilpi; Petteri Lax	
Discus Throw	Frantz Kruger; Mikko Kyyrö	Tanja Komulainen; Sanna Kämäräinen
Hammer Throw	Olli-Pekka Karjalainen; Tuomas Seppänen; David Söderberg	Merja Korpela
Javelin Throw	Harri Haatainen; Tero Pitkämäki; Teemu Wirkkala	Oona Sormunen
Decathlon	Mikko Halvari	
4x100 m relay	Hannu Ali-Huokuna; Hannu Hämäläinen; Joni Rautanen; Niko Taavitsainen; Jonathan Åstrand	

== Results ==
2010 Barcelona	Gold	Silver	Bronze	Total
Finland (FIN)	0	0	1	1

== Medalists ==
Event	Athletes	Qualification		Final	
Event	Athletes	Result	Rank	Result	Rank
Javelin throw	Tero Pitkämäki	83.15 Q	2	86.67	3rd place, bronze medalist(s)
