= Finland at the 2006 European Athletics Championships =

Finland sent 56 athletes to the 2006 European Athletics Championships in Gothenburg. It won 2 gold and 1 silver medal.

== Results ==
2006 Gothenburg	Gold	Silver	Bronze	Total
Finland (FIN)	2	1	0	0

List of Finnish results, where Athletes reached the Final in that event. (Heats/Quarter-Finals/Semi-Final scores will not be recorded)

Place	Athlete	Event	Result
1	Jukka Keskisalo	3,000 m steeplechase M	8.24,89
1	Olli-Pekka Karjalainen	Hammer throw M	80.84 m
2	Tero Pitkämäki	Javelin M	86.44 m
4	Matti Mononen	Pole Vault M	5.65 m
7	Janne Holmén	Marathon M	2.13.10
10	Mikaela Ingberg	Javelin W	56.70 m
11	Ville Tiisanoja	Shot Put M	19.48 m
11	Paula Tarvainen	Javelin W	55.59 m

== Competitors ==
=== Men ===
100 m: Jarkko Ruostekivi, Simo Sipilä, Nghi Tran
200 m: Tommi Hartonen
1500 m: Jonas Hamm
Marathon: Janne Holmén, Jaakko Kero, Francis Kirwa, Tuomo Lehtinen
3000 m steeplechase: Jukka Keskisalo
110 m hurdles: Marko Ritola, Olli Talsi, Juha Sonck
50 km walk: Antti Kempas, Jarkko Kinnunen
High jump: Oskari Frösen, Heikki Taneli, Osku Torro
Pole vault: Matti Mononen
Shot put: Ville Tiisanoja, Conny Karlsson, Mika Vasara
Discus: Mikko Kyyrö, Mika Loikkanen
Hammer throw: Olli-Pekka Karjalainen, David Söderberg
Javelin: Tero Pitkämäki, Tero Järvenpää, Teemu Wirkkala
Decathlon: Jaakko Ojaniemi, Lassi Raunio
4 × 100 m: Timo Salonen, Nghi Tran, Jarkko Ruostekivi, Tommi Hartonen

=== Women ===
100 m: Heidi Hannula
200 m: Sari Keskisalo
400 m: Kirsi Mykkänen
Marathon: Maija Oravamäki
100 m hurdles: Johanna Halkoaho, Piia Roslund
400 m hurdles: Ilona Ranta
Long jump: Natalia Kilpeläinen
Triple jump: Natalia Kilpeläinen
Hammer throw: Sini Pöyry, Merja Korpela
Javelin: Mikaela Ingberg, Kirsi Ahonen, Paula Tarvainen
Heptathlon: Niina Kelo, Maija Kovalainen, Salla Käppi
4 × 100 m: Sari Keskitalo, Johanna Manninen, Ilona Ranta, Heidi Hannula
