= 2019 Finnish Athletics Championships =

- Dates: 1–4 August
- Host city: Lappeenranta
- Venue: Kimpinen Sports Centre
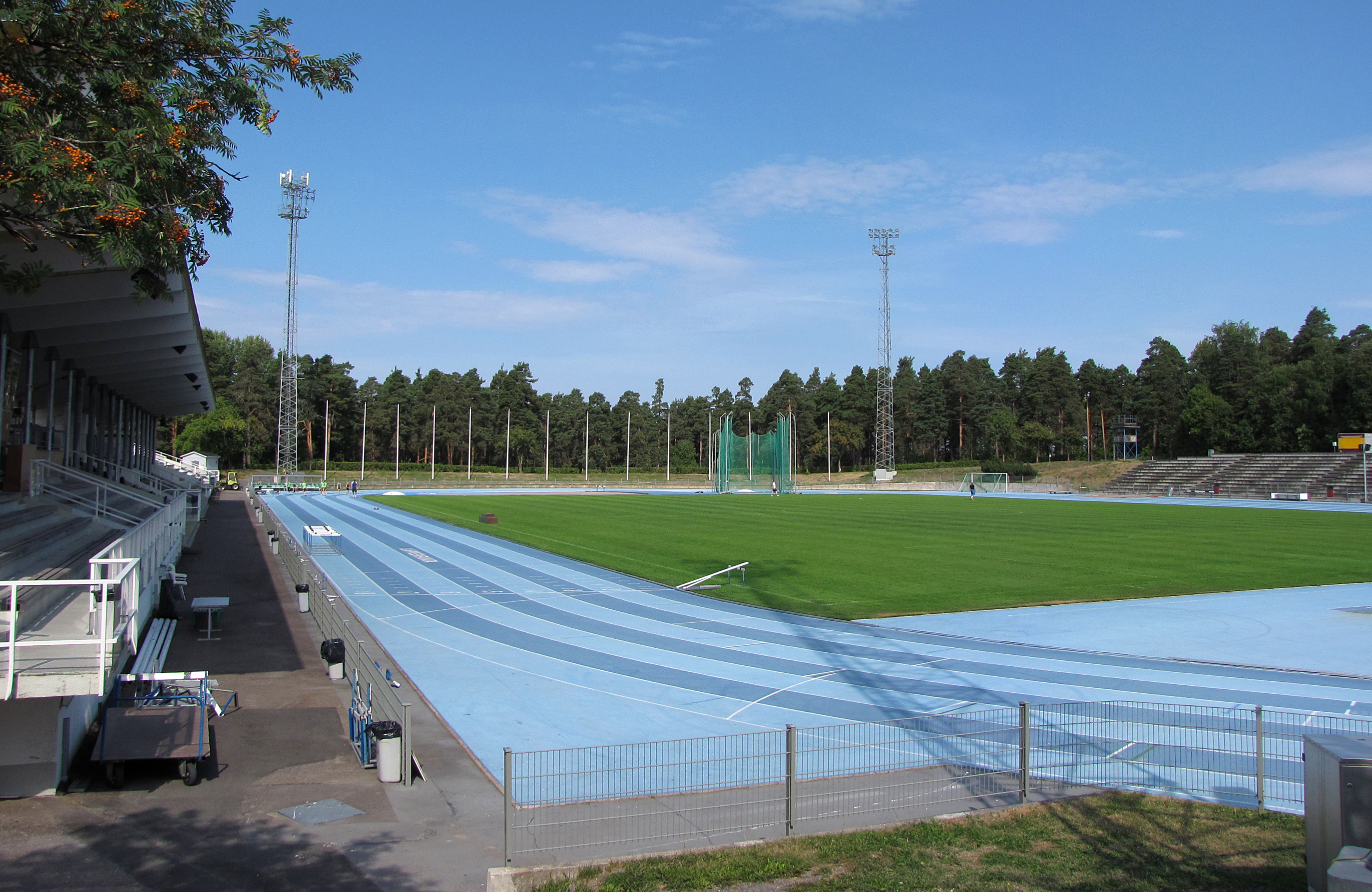

The 2019 Finnish Athletics Championships (Finnish: Kalevan kisat 2019) was the year's national outdoor track and field championships for Finland. It was held on 1–4 August at the Kimpinen Sports Centre stadium in Lappeenranta. The walking events took place outside the stadium near Lappeenranta's harbour.

== Results ==
=== Men ===
Event	Gold		Silver		Bronze	
100 metres	Konsta Alatupa; Kokkolan Työväen Urheilijat	10.53 PB	Riku Illukka; Vantaan Salamat	10.59	Samuel Purola; Oulun Pyrintö	10.64
200 metres	Roope Saarinen; Esbo IF	21.13	Riku Illukka; Vantaan Salamat	21.31 PB	Konsta Alatupa; Kokkolan Työväen Urheilijat	21.53
400 metres	Eljas Aalto; IF Sibbo-Vargarna	47.79	Ville Lampinen; Kenttäurheilijat-58	48.03	Christoffer Envall; IK Falken	48.07
800 metres	Markus Teijula; Naantalin Löyly	1:51.01	Ville Lampinen; Kenttäurheilijat-58	1:51.03	Joonas Rinne; Saarijärven Pullistus	1:51.34
1500 metres	Joonas Rinne; Saarijärven Pullistus	3:57.05	Samu Mikkonen; Joensuun Kataja	3:59.05	Martti Siikaluoma; Lahden Ahkera	3:59.17
5000 metres	Martti Siikaluoma; Lahden Ahkera	14:35.19	Eemil Helander; Jyväskylän Kenttäurheilijat	14:38.00 PB	Eero Saleva; Helsingin Kisa-Veikot	14:41.15
10,000 metres	Eero Saleva; Helsingin Kisa-Veikot	30:21.21	Aki Nummela; Helsingin Kisa-Veikot	30:23.34 PB	Antti Ihamäki; Alajärven Ankkurit	30:27.74 PB
110 m hurdles	Elmo Lakka; Jyväskylän Kenttäurheilijat	13.70	Santeri Kuusiniemi; Lempäälän Kisa	14.28 PB	Ilari Manninen; Jyväskylän Kenttäurheilijat	14.31
400 m hurdles	Oskari Mörö; Esbo IF	51.21	Joni Vainio-Kaila; Laitilan Jyske	51.69	Tuomas Lehtonen; Liedon Parma	52.28
20 km walk	Aku Partanen; Lappeenrannan Urheilu-Miehet	1:24:38	Aleksi Ojala; Urjalan Urheilijat	1:28:02	Joni Hava; Espoon Tapiot	1:33:04
High jump	Arttu Mattila; Äänekosken Urheilijat	2.12 m	Samuli Eriksson; Salon Vilpas	2.12 m	Valtteri Välimäki; Uudenkaupungin Kenttäkarhut Jesse Huttunen; Savitaipaleen Urheilijat	2.06 m
Pole vault	Tomas Wecksten; Karhulan Urheilijat	5.31 m	Anton Kunnas; IF Sibbo-Vargarna	5.11 m	Eetu Turakainen; Turun Urheiluliitto Einari Välimäki; Noormarkun Nopsa	5.01 m
Long jump	Kristian Pulli; Kaipolan Vire	7.89 m	Roni Ollikainen; Helsingin Kisa-Veikot	7.83 m	Eero Haapala; Viipurin Urheilijat	7.67 m
Triple jump	Simo Lipsanen; Lappeenrannan Urheilu-Miehet	16.44 m	Tuomas Kaukolahti; Kenttäurheilijat-58	16.29 m	Topias Koukkula; Kangasalan Urheilijat -68	16.12 m
Shot put	Arttu Kangas; Kankaanpään seudun Leisku	18.33 m	Nico Oksanen; Loimaan Voima	17.88 m PB	Tomas Söderlund; IF Raseborg	17.54 m
Discus throw	Oskari Perälampi; Espoon Tapiot	54.81 m	Juha Lahdenranta; Porin Yleisurheilu	53.02 m	Ville Kivioja; Nokian Urheilijat	52.20 m
Hammer throw	Henri Liipola; Someron Esa	73.29 m	Aaron Kangas; Kankaanpään seudun Leisku	73.17 m	Tuomas Seppänen; Noormarkun Nopsa	72.15 m
Javelin throw	Lassi Etelätalo; Joensuun Kataja	84.11 m	Antti Ruuskanen; Pielaveden Sampo	82.57 m	Toni Kuusela; Kuortaneen Kunto	79.53 m
Decathlon	Elmo Savola; Lappajärven Veikot	7666 pts	Juuso Hassi; Oriveden Ponnistus	7169 pts	Leo Uusimäki; Kenttäurheilijat-58	7056 pts

=== Women ===
Event	Gold		Silver		Bronze	
100 metres	Lotta Kemppinen; HIFK	11.65	Hanna-Maari Latvala; Jyväskylän Kenttäurheilijat	11.66	Anniina Kortetmaa; Jyväskylän Kenttäurheilijat	11.71
200 metres	Hanna-Maari Latvala; Jyväskylän Kenttäurheilijat	23.78	Anniina Kortetmaa; Jyväskylän Kenttäurheilijat	23.84	Lotta Kemppinen; HIFK	24.24
400 metres	Amira Chokairy; Helsingin Kisa-Veikot	55.84	Jeanine Nygård; IF Drott	56.12	Ida Ravaska; Veitsiluodon Kisaveikot	56.16
800 metres	Sara Kuivisto; Porvoon Akilles	2:04.08	Nathalie Blomqvist; IK Falken	2:07.62 PB	Viola Westling; Turun Urheiluliitto	2:11.02 PB
1500 metres	Sara Kuivisto; Porvoon Akilles	4:18.00	Kristiina Mäki; Lahden Ahkera	4:21.36	Nathalie Blomqvist; IK Falken	4:22.87
5000 metres	Moona Korkealaakso; Lappeenrannan Urheilu-Miehet	16:43.52 PB	Katarina Skräddar; Helsingin Jyry	16:50.15 PB	Jenni Moskari; Kenttäurheilijat-58	17:15.02
10,000 metres	Johanna Peiponen; Rovaniemen Lappi	33:59.63	Alisa Vainio; Lappeenrannan Urheilu-Miehet	34:05,00	Katarina Skräddar; Helsingin Jyry	34:08.64 PB
100 m hurdles	Reetta Hurske; Tampereen Pyrintö	13.05	Nooralotta Neziri; Jyväskylän Kenttäurheilijat	13.05	Annimari Korte; HIFK	13.12
400 m hurdles	Eveliina Määttänen; Keski-Uudenmaan Yleisurheilu	58.59	Viivi Lehikoinen; HIFK	58.67	Nea Mattila; HIFK	59.56
10 km walk	Enni Nurmi; Espoon Tapiot	47:30	Hele Haapaniemi; Espoon Tapiot	47:41 PB	Elisa Neuvonen; Lappeenrannan Urheilu-Miehet	48:07
High jump	Ella Junnila; Tampereen Pyrintö	1.86 m	Heta Tuuri; Lahden Ahkera	1.84 m	Jessica Kähärä; Mikkelin Kilpa-Veikot	1.79 m
Pole vault	Wilma Murto; Salon Vilpas	4.26 m	Laura Ollikainen; Varkauden Kenttä-Veikot	4.11 m	Aino Siitonen; Helsingin Kisa-Veikot	3.91 m
Long jump	Taika Koilahti; Turun Weikot	6.69 PB	Anne-Mari Lehtiö; Kenttäurheilijat-58	6.24 m	Marika Partinen; Joensuun Kataja	6.18 m
Triple jump	Kristiina Mäkelä; Orimattilan Jymy	14.19 m	Emma Pullola; Vaasan Vasama	13.54 m	Senni Salminen; Imatran Urheilijat	13.54 m PB
Shot put	Senja Mäkitörmä; Varpaisjärven Vire	16.19 m	Katri Hirvonen; Joensuun Kataja	15.00 m	Eveliina Rouvali; Kuopion Reipas	14.84 m
Discus throw	Salla Sipponen; Keuruun Kisailijat	56.29 m	Sanna Kämäräinen; Lapinlahden Veto	55.66 m	Vilma Paakkala; Espoon Tapiot	51.99 m
Hammer throw	Krista Tervo; Karhulan Katajaiset	69.58 m	Kati Ojaloo; Noormarkun Nopsa	67.95 m	Suvi Koskinen; Kauhajoen Karhu	64.87 m PB
Javelin throw	Heidi Nokelainen; Joensuun Kataja	58.70 m	Julia Valtanen; Rauman Urheilijat	54.78 m PB	Jatta-Mari Jääskeläinen; Turun Urheiluliitto	54.28 m
Heptathlon	Maria Huntington; Tampereen Pyrintö	6339 pts PB	Miia Sillman; Tampereen Pyrintö	6048 pts	Jutta Heikkinen; Joensuun Kataja	5952 pts PB
