= 2020 Finnish Indoor Athletics Championships =

- Dates: 15–16 February 2020
- Host city: Tampere, Finland
- Venue: Tampere Exhibition and Sports Centre
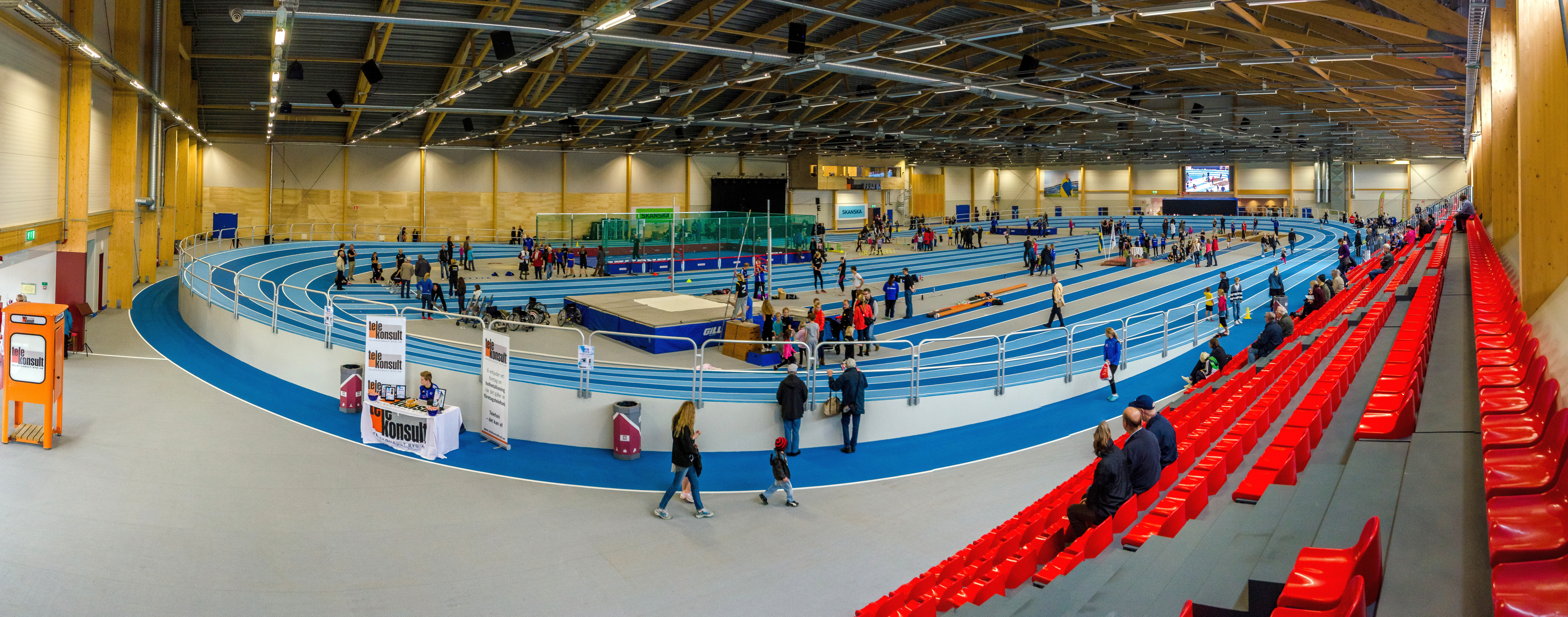

The 2020 Finnish Indoor Athletics Championships (Finnish: Yleisurheilun sisäratojen Suomen-mestaruuskilpailut 2020) was the 59th edition of the national championship in indoor track and field for Finland. It was held on 15 and 16 February at the Tampere Exhibition and Sports Centre in Tampere, with local club Tampereen Pyrintö taking on hosting duties.

== Results ==
=== Men ===
Event	Gold		Silver		Bronze	
60 m	Samuli Samuelsson; Ikaalisten Urheilijat	6.80	Samuel Purola; Oulun Pyrintö	6.83	Riku Illukka; Vantaan Salamat	6.89
200 m	Samuel Purola; Oulun Pyrintö	20.85 PB	Oskari Lehtonen; Nurmijärven Yleisurheilu	21.36	Ville Aarnivala; Tampereen Pyrintö	21.55 PB
400 m	Erik Back; HIFK	48.20 PB	Ville Aarnivala; Tampereen Pyrintö	48.24 PB	Ilari Ryyppö; Tampereen Urheilijat -38	48.63 PB
800 m	Joonas Rinne; Saarijärven Pullistus	1:50.66 PB	Jaakko Lehtilä; Tampereen Pyrintö	1:52.75 PB	Eelis Uitto; Viipurin Urheilijat	1:53.41 PB
1500 m	Samu Mikkonen; Joensuun Kataja	3:53.53	Joonas Rinne; Saarijärven Pullistus	3:53.56 PB	Panu Jantunen; Helsingin Kisa-Veikot	3:55.82
3000 m	Samu Mikkonen; Joensuun Kataja	8:18.16	Martti Siikaluoma; Lahden Ahkera	8:18.19	Eero Saleva; Helsingin Kisa-Veikot	8:21.73 PB
60 m hurdles	Elmo Lakka; Jyväskylän Kenttäurheilijat	7.69	Ilari Manninen; Jyväskylän Kenttäurheilijat	8.02	Viktor Kantele; Porvoon Akilles	8.24
300 m hurdles	Tuomas Lehtonen; Liedon Parma	36.08 PB	Jonni Blomqvist; Porvoon Akilles	37.33 PB	Anton Tallbacka; HIFK	38.02 PB
5000 m walk	Aku Partanen; Lappeenrannan Urheilu-Miehet	19:46.57	Joni Hava; Espoon Tapiot	20:55.40 PB	Jaakko Määttänen; Espoon Tapiot	21:07.60 PB
High jump	Daniel Kosonen; Tampereen Pyrintö	2.11 m	Arttu Mattila; Äänekosken Urheilijat	2.08 m	Matias Mustonen; Lempäälän Kisa	2.02 m
Pole vault	Urho Kujanpää; Tampereen Pyrintö Tommi Holttinen; Someron Esa	5.40 m	Not awarded		Mikko Paavola; Alajärven Ankkurit	5.30 m
Long jump	Topias Koukkula; Kangasalan Urheilijat -68	7.67 m PB	Kristian Pulli; Viipurin Urheilijat	7.59 m	Julius Toivola; Jyväskylän Kenttäurheilijat	7.09 m
Triple jump	Simo Lipsanen; Lappeenrannan Urheilu-Miehet	16.22 m	Iikka Alingué; Janakkalan Jana	15.94 PB	Arttu Tyystjärvi; Lappeenrannan Urheilu-Miehet	15.70 PB
Shot put	Eero Ahola; Porin Yleisurheilu	18.68 PB	Arttu Kangas; Kankaanpään seudun Leisku	18.44 m	Tomas Söderlund; IF Raseborg	17.94 m
4 × 300 m relay	Esbo IF; Jonathan Brace; Tuukka Huuskola; Roope Saarinen; Oskari Mörö	2:19.35	Helsingin Kisa-Veikot; Matias Linkoaho; Lassi Kaukonen; Niko Viljola; Tommi Mäkinen	2:20.15	Kenttäurheilijat-58; Leo Uusimäki; Tuomas Kaukolahti; Elias Jrad; Ville Lampinen	2:21.20

=== Women ===
Event	Gold		Silver		Bronze	
60 m	Lotta Kemppinen; HIFK	7.33	Anna Pursiainen; Espoon Tapiot	7.45 PB	Aino Pulkkinen; Jyväskylän Kenttäurheilijat	7.45 PB
200 m	Aino Pulkkinen; Jyväskylän Kenttäurheilijat	24.14	Milja Thureson; Turun Toverit	24.32	Mette Baas; Veitsiluodon Kisaveikot	24.64 PB
400 m	Eveliina Määttänen; Keski-Uudenmaan Yleisurheilu	55.59	Mette Baas; Veitsiluodon Kisaveikot	55.73 PB	Kira Kruuti; Helsingin Kisa-Veikot	57.34
800 m	Nathalie Blomqvist; IK Falken	2:10.40 m	Heini Ikonen; Jyväskylän Kenttäurheilijat	2:12.34 PB	Ronja Koskela; Kuivasjärven Aura	2:12.71 PB
1500 m	Nathalie Blomqvist; IK Falken	4:23.13 PB	Ilona Mononen; Lahden Ahkera	4:29.13 PB	Kaisa Tyni; Pyhtään Yritys	4:29.56
3000 m	Camilla Richardsson; Vasa IS	9:18.40	Johanna Peiponen; Rovaniemen Lappi	9:45.66	Nina Chydenius; Gamlakarleby IF	9:49.21
60 m hurdles	Nooralotta Neziri; Jyväskylän Kenttäurheilijat	8.07	Lotta Harala; Tampereen Pyrintö	8.28	Julia Enarvi; Jyväskylän Kenttäurheilijat	8.47
300 m hurdles	Viivi Lehikoinen; HIFK	40.97 PB	Eveliina Määttänen; Keski-Uudenmaan Yleisurheilu	41.11 PB	Frida Hämäläinen; Tampereen Pyrintö	41.83 PB
3000 m walk	Anniina Kivimäki; Lapuan Virkiä	13:10.85 PB	Elisa Neuvonen; Lappeenrannan Urheilu-Miehet	13:23.59 PB	Heta Veikkola; Lapuan Virkiä	13:25.34 PB
High jump	Laura Rautanen; Vilppulan Veikot	1.85 m	Heta Tuuri; Lahden Ahkera	1.85 m PB	Sini Lällä; Jyväskylän Kenttäurheilijat	1.85 m PB
Pole vault	Wilma Murto; Salon Vilpas	4.60 m	Elina Lampela; Oulun Pyrintö	4.15 m	Laura Ollikainen; Varkauden Kenttä-Veikot	4.07 m
Long jump	Anne-Mari Lehtiö; Kenttäurheilijat-58	6.14 m	Miia Sillman; Tampereen Pyrintö	6.13 m PB	Emmi Mäkinen; Jyväskylän Kenttäurheilijat	6.12 m
Triple jump	Senni Salminen; Imatran Urheilijat	13.80 m	Emma Pullola; Vaasan Vasama	13.24 m	Tilda Lipasti; HIFK	12.82 PB
Shot put	Senja Mäkitörmä; Varpaisjärven Vire	15.95 m	Eveliina Rouvali; Kuopion Reipas	15.77 m	Jessica Meriheinä; Liljendal IK	14.68 m
4 × 300 m relay	Jyväskylän Kenttäurheilijat; Heidi Salminen; Emmi Mäkinen; Hilma Kinnunen; Aino Pulkkinen	2:40.51	Helsingin Kisa-Veikot; Sara Siltala; Annika Hannola; Anniina Laitinen; Kira Kruuti	2:42.38	Tampereen Pyrintö; Frida Hämäläinen; Miia Sillman; Alisa Aalto; Pinja Heinonen	2:42.64
