= 2020 Finnish Athletics Championships =

- Dates: 13–16 August
- Host city: Turku
- Venue: Paavo Nurmi Stadium
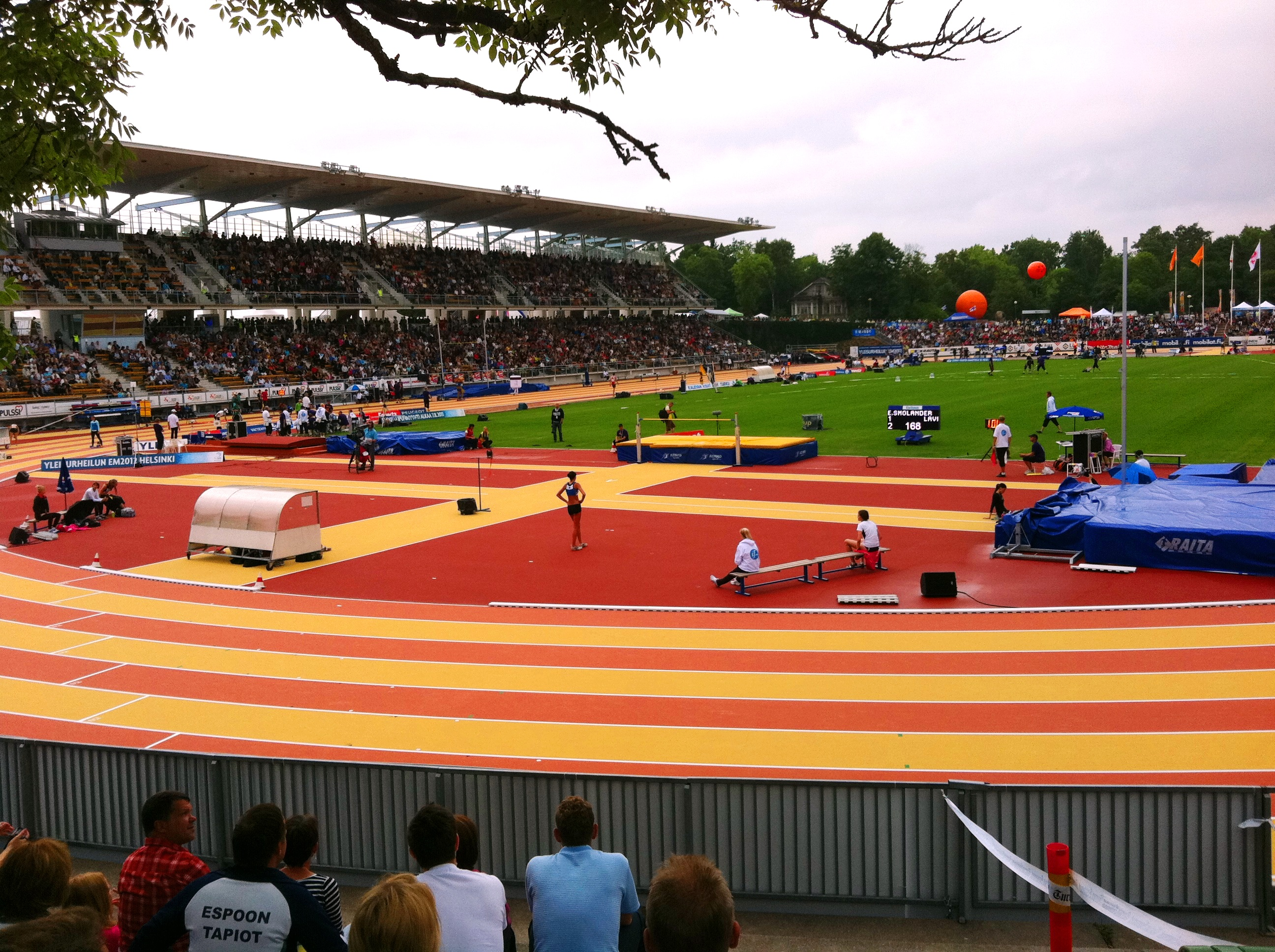
- Official website: https://kalevankisat.fi/

The 2020 Finnish Athletics Championships (Finnish: Kalevan kisat 2020) was the year's national outdoor track and field championships for Finland. It was held on 13–16 August at the Paavo Nurmi Stadium in Turku.

== Results ==
=== Men ===
Event	Gold		Silver		Bronze	
100 metres (+0.4 m/s)	Viljami Kaasalainen; Jyväskylän Kenttäurheilijat	10.35	Samuli Samuelsson; Ikaalisten Urheilijat	10.43	Riku Illukka; Vantaan Salamat	10.49
200 metres (-0.6 m/s)	Samuli Samuelsson; Ikaalisten Urheilijat	21.15	Roope Saarinen; Esbo IF	21.20	Samuel Purola; Oulun Pyrintö	21.21
400 metres	Tommi Mäkinen; Helsingin Kisa-Veikot	47.85 PB	Ilari Ryyppö; Tampereen Urheilijat -38	48.22 PB	Christian Vänttinen; Naantalin Löyly	48.27 PB
800 metres	Joonas Rinne; Saarijärven Pullistus	1:50.14	Ville Lampinen; Kenttäurheilijat-58	1:50.53	Benjamin Lee; Helsingin Kisa-Veikot	1:50.81 PB
1500 metres	Joonas Rinne; Saarijärven Pullistus	3:49.84	Konsta Hämäläinen; Joensuun Kataja	3:51.85	Samu Mikkonen; Joensuun Kataja	3:52.50
5000 metres	Konsta Hämäläinen; Joensuun Kataja	14:28.54 PB	Eemil Helander; Jyväskylän Kenttäurheilijat	14:29.53	Eero Saleva; Helsingin Kisa-Veikot	14:30.68
10,000 metres	Eero Saleva; Helsingin Kisa-Veikot	29:52.65 SB	Arttu Vattulainen; Joensuun Kataja	29:57.90 SB	Frédéric Tranchand; Turun Toverit	30:07.18
110 m hurdles (+1.2 m/s)	Elmo Lakka; Jyväskylän Kenttäurheilijat	13.70 SB	Ilari Manninen; Jyväskylän Kenttäurheilijat	14.25	Valtteri Kalliokulju; Liedon Parma	14.36
400 m hurdles	Tuomas Lehtonen; Liedon Parma	50.53 PB	Oskari Mörö; Esbo IF	50.90 SB	Jonni Blomqvist; Borgå Akilles	51.44 =PB
3,000 m steeplechase	Hannu Granberg; Lahden Ahkera	8:56.07 SB	Wilho Hautala; Lahden Ahkera	8:56.71 PB	Miika Tenhunen; Nivalan Urheilijat	8:56.85
20 km walk	Aleksi Ojala; Urjalan Urheilijat	1:23:49 PB	Joni Hava; Espoon Tapiot	1:28:57 PB	Matias Korpela; Turun Urheiluliitto	1:31:55 SB
High jump	Arttu Mattila; Äänekosken Urheilijat	2.17 m	Daniel Kosonen; Tampereen Pyrintö	2.17 m	Samuli Eriksson; Salon Vilpas	2.07 m
Pole vault	Mikko Paavola; Alajärven Ankkurit	5.31 m	Johan-Antti Kivilahti; Haapajärven Kiila	5.31 m PB	Tomas Wecksten; Karhulan Urheilijat	5.21 m
Long jump	Kristian Pulli; Viipurin Urheilijat	7.83 m (+0.6 m/s)	Kristian Bäck; Vasa IS	7.77 m (+0.6 m/s) SB	Roni Ollikainen; Helsingin Kisa-Veikot	7.53 m (-0.2 m/s)
Triple jump	Simo Lipsanen; Lappeenrannan Urheilu-Miehet	16.30 m (+0.9 m/s)	Tuomas Kaukolahti; Kenttäurheilijat-58	16.12 m (+1.0 m/s) SB	Topias Koukkula; Kangasalan Urheilijat -68	15.88 m (+0.6 m/s) SB
Shot put	Eero Ahola; Porin Yleisurheilu	18.30 m PB	Arttu Kangas; Kankaanpään seudun Leisku	18.21 m	Arttu Korkeasalo; Lielahden Kipinä	17.93 m
Discus throw	Frantz Kruger; Vasa IS	58.38 m SB	Oskari Perälampi; Espoon Tapiot	56.43 m	Ville Kivioja; Nokian Urheilijat	55.11 m SB
Hammer throw	Aaron Kangas; Kankaanpään seudun Leisku	76.94 m	Aleksi Jaakkola; Vehmaisten Urheilijat	72.77 m	Henri Liipola; Someron Esa	72.19 m
Javelin throw	Lassi Etelätalo; Joensuun Kataja	82.20 m SB	Antti Ruuskanen; Pielaveden Sampo	79.22 m SB	Toni Kuusela; Kuortaneen Kunto	77.22 m
Decathlon	Juuso Hassi; Oriveden Ponnistus	7379 pts SB	Leo Uusimäki; Kenttäurheilijat-58	7288 pts	Ville Toivonen; Ähtärin Urheilijat	7152 pts PB

=== Women ===
Event	Gold		Silver		Bronze	
100 metres (+1.1 m/s)	Lotta Kemppinen; HIFK	11.62	Anniina Kortetmaa; Jyväskylän Kenttäurheilijat	11.71	Nooralotta Neziri; Jyväskylän Kenttäurheilijat	11.75
200 metres (+0.7 m/s)	Anniina Kortetmaa; Jyväskylän Kenttäurheilijat	23.74 SB	Lotta Kemppinen; HIFK	23.86	Milja Thureson; Turun Toverit	23.90 SB
400 metres	Mette Baas; Veitsiluodon Kisaveikot	54.29	Amira Chokairy; Helsingin Kisa-Veikot	54.69 PB	Milja Thureson; Turun Toverit	54.91 SB
800 metres	Sara Kuivisto; Porvoon Akilles	2:03.24	Viola Westling; Turun Urheiluliitto	2:11.94	Ilona Mononen; Lahden Ahkera	2:11.46
1500 metres	Sara Kuivisto; Porvoon Akilles	4:29.39 SB	Ilona Mononen; Lahden Ahkera	4:31.61	Kaisa Tyni; Pyhtään Yritys	4:32.78
5000 metres	Annemari Kiekara; Pudasjärven Urheilijat	16:21.69	Johanna Peiponen; Rovaniemen Lappi	16:33.99	Janica Rauma; Turun Urheiluliitto	16:44.64 SB
10,000 metres	Annemari Kiekara; Pudasjärven Urheilijat	34:13.33 SB	Johanna Peiponen; Rovaniemen Lappi	34:17.31	Laura Manninen; Kenttäurheilijat-58	35:01.48
100 m hurdles (+1.0 m/s)	Annimari Korte; HIFK	12.79	Nooralotta Neziri; Jyväskylän Kenttäurheilijat	13.01	Reetta Hurske; Tampereen Pyrintö	13.02
400 m hurdles	Viivi Lehikoinen; HIFK	58.58	Martta Rautala; Viipurin Urheilijat	58.87 PB	Aada Aho; Raision Kuula	58.88 PB
3,000 m steeplechase	Janica Rauma; Turun Urheiluliitto	10:17.26	Alisa Virtanen; Jyväskylän Kenttäurheilijat	10:27.15 PB	Sofie Lövdahl; Vasa IS	10:32.77 SB
10 km walk	Anniina Kivimäki; Lapuan Virkiä	47:11.84 PB	Elisa Neuvonen; Lappeenrannan Urheilu-Miehet	47:17.84 PB	Tiia Kuikka; Lappeenrannan Urheilu-Miehet	47:26.17 PB
High jump	Heta Tuuri; Lahden Ahkera	1.86 m SB	Sini Lällä; Jyväskylän Kenttäurheilijat	1.86 m PB	Jessica Kähärä; Mikkelin Kilpa-Veikot	1.80 m
Pole vault	Wilma Murto; Salon Vilpas	4.32 m	Elina Lampela; Oulun Pyrintö	4.12 m	Saga Andersson; Esbo IF	4.04 m
Long jump	Senni Salminen; Imatran Urheilijat	6.56 (+1.5 m/s) PB	Kira Kytölä; Esbo IF	6.18 m (+0.2 m/s) SB	Sini Sanaslahti; Kaipolan Vire	6.12 m (+2.0 m/s)
Triple jump	Kristiina Mäkelä; Orimattilan Jymy	13.61 m (+0.1 m/s)	Emma Pullola; Vaasan Vasama	13.05 m (-0.1 m/s)	Elina Kostiainen; Vihdin Viesti	12.92 m (-0.6 m/s) PB
Shot put	Senja Mäkitörmä; Varpaisjärven Vire	16.35 m	Eveliina Rouvali; Kuopion Reipas	15.75 m	Helena Leveelahti; Virtain Urheilijat	15.36 m PB
Discus throw	Salla Sipponen; Keuruun Kisailijat	58.19 m	Sanna Kämäräinen; Lapinlahden Veto	55.50 m	Helena Leveelahti; Virtain Urheilijat	54.06 m
Hammer throw	Silja Kosonen; Someron Esa	68.40 m	Kati Ojaloo; Noormarkun Nopsa	67.16 m	Suvi Koskinen; Kauhajoen Karhu	65.17 m PB
Javelin throw	Sanne Erkkola; Turun Urheiluliitto	57.04 m PB	Jatta-Mari Jääskeläinen; Turun Urheiluliitto	56.50 m SB	Jenni Kangas; Lahden Ahkera	56.16 m PB
Heptathlon	Maria Huntington; Tampereen Pyrintö	6074 pts SB	Saga Vanninen; Tampereen Pyrintö	5861 pts PB	Amanda Liljendal; Borgå Akilles	5467 pts PB
