= Finland at the 2022 European Championships =

in (Germany) Munich 11 August 2022 – 22 August 2022
- Competitors: 107 in 9 sports
- Medals Ranked 23rd: Gold 2 Silver 1 Bronze 1 Total 4

European Championships appearances
- 2018; 2022

Finland competed at the 2022 European Championships in Munich from August 11 to August 22, 2022.

== Medallists ==
Medal	Name	Sport	Event	Date
Gold	Wilma Murto	Athletics	Women's pole vault	16 August
Gold	Topi Raitanen	Athletics	Men's 3000 metres steeplechase	19 August
Silver	Kristiina Mäkelä	Athletics	Women's triple jump	19 August
Bronze	Lassi Etelätalo	Athletics	Men's javelin throw	21 August

== Competitors ==
The following is the list of number of competitors in the Championships:

Sport	Men	Women	Total
Artistic Gymnastics (men and women)	5	5	10
Athletics	29	44	73
Beach volleyball	2	4	6
Canoe sprint	4	2	6
Cycling road	0	2	2
Rowing	3	1	4
Sport climbing	0	1	1
Table tennis	2	2	4
Triathlon	0	1	1
Total	45	62	107

== Athletics ==
Finland entered the following athletes.

Key

- Q = Qualified for the next round
- q = Qualified for the next round as a fastest loser or, in field events, by position without achieving the qualifying target
- NR = National record
- PB = Personal best
- SB = Season best
- N/A = Round not applicable for the event

=== Men ===
Track and road events

Athlete	Event	Heat		Semifinal		Final	
Athlete	Event	Result	Rank	Result	Rank	Result	Rank
Samuli Samuelsson	100 m	10.39	4	Did not advance			
Samuel Purola	200 m	20.77	4 q	20.83	7	Did not advance	
Joonas Rinne	800 m	1:48.03	5	Did not advance			
Arttu Vattulainen	Marathon	—N/a				DNF	–
Santeri Kuusiniemi	110 m hurdles	13.89	3 Q	13.81	6	Did not advance	
Elmo Lakka	110 m hurdles	13.78	6	Did not advance			
Ilari Manninen	110 m hurdles	14.08	6	Did not advance			
Tuomas Lehtonen	400 m hurdles	52.75	7	Did not advance			
Topi Raitanen	3000 m steeplechase	8:33.51	5 Q	—N/a		8:21.80	1st place, gold medalist(s)
Joni Hava	20 km walk	—N/a				1:25:32	13
Jerry Jokinen	20 km walk	—N/a				1:26:11 PB	17
Jaakko Määttänen	20 km walk	—N/a				1:29:38	24
Aleksi Ojala	35 km walk	—N/a				2:39:06	12
Santeri Örn; Samuli Samuelsson; Oskari Lehtonen; Samuel Purola	4 × 100 m relay	39.37	6	—N/a		Did not advance	

Field events

Athlete	Event	Qualification		Final	
Athlete	Event	Distance	Position	Distance	Position
Juho Alasaari	Pole vault	5.30	=21	Did not advance	
Tommi Holttinen	Pole vault	5.50 SB	=15	Did not advance	
Urho Kujanpää	Pole vault	5.65 SB	12 q	5.50	=9
Kristian Pulli	Long jump	7.70	14	Did not advance	
Simo Lipsanen	Triple jump	15.93	17	Did not advance	
Aaron Kangas	Hammer throw	71.08	18	Did not advance	
Henri Liipola	Hammer throw	71.55	15	Did not advance	
Tuomas Seppänen	Hammer throw	71.24	16	Did not advance	
Lassi Etelätalo	Javelin throw	79.29	3 q	86.44 PB	3rd place, bronze medalist(s)
Toni Keränen	Javelin throw	77.01	13	Did not advance	
Toni Kuusela	Javelin throw	79.26	5 q	80.20	5

=== Women ===
Track and road events

Athlete	Event	Heat		Semifinal		Final	
Athlete	Event	Result	Rank	Result	Rank	Result	Rank
Anniina Kortetmaa	200 m	23.60	5	Did not advance			
Mette Baas	400 m	53.02	5	Did not advance			
Milja Thureson	400 m	53.63	8	Did not advance			
Sara Kuivisto	800 m	2:04.32	3 Q	2:01.59 SB	6	Did not advance	
Eveliina Määttänen	800 m	2:03.66	7	Did not advance			
Nathalie Blomqvist	1500 m	4:14.90	12	—N/a		Did not advance	
Ilona Mononen	5000 m	—N/a				16:10.97	18
Camilla Richardsson	5000 m	—N/a				15:16.71 PB	10
Camilla Richardsson	10,000 m	—N/a				32:19.27 PB	9
Nina Chydenius	Marathon	—N/a				2:43:00	39
Annemari Kiekara	Marathon	—N/a				2:48:30	49
Suvi Miettinen	Marathon	—N/a				2:47:15	46
Alisa Vainio	Marathon	—N/a				DNF	–
Reetta Hurske	100 m hurdles	Bye		12.95	3	Did not advance	
Kristiina Halonen	400 m hurdles	56.70	4 q	56.82	7	Did not advance	
Viivi Lehikoinen	400 m hurdles	Bye		54.50 NR	1 Q	55.58	6
Venla Laiho	20 km walk	—N/a				1:43:47	20
Enni Nurmi	20 km walk	—N/a				1:36:56	15
Elisa Neuvonen	35 km walk	—N/a				2:59:00	10
Johanna Kylmänen; Aino Pulkkinen; Anniina Kortetmaa; Anna Pursiainen	4 × 100 m relay	44.73	7	—N/a		Did not advance	
Milja Thureson; Mette Baas; Aino Pulkkinen; Kristiina Halonen	4 × 400 m relay	3:33.40	8	—N/a		Did not advance	

Field events

Athlete	Event	Qualification		Final	
Athlete	Event	Distance	Position	Distance	Position
Ella Junnila	High jump	1.78	=19	Did not advance	
Sini Lällä	High jump	1.78	23	Did not advance	
Heta Tuuri	High jump	1.83	=15	Did not advance	
Saga Andersson	Pole vault	4.40	13	Did not advance	
Elina Lampela	Pole vault	4.40	12 q	4.40	11
Wilma Murto	Pole vault	4.50	7 q	4.85 NR, =CR	1st place, gold medalist(s)
Kristiina Mäkelä	Triple jump	14.11	5 q	14.64 NR	2nd place, silver medalist(s)
Senni Salminen	Triple jump	13.90	8 q	14.13	7
Senja Mäkitörmä	Shot put	16.94	19	Did not advance	
Eveliina Rouvali	Shot put	17.07	17	Did not advance	
Salla Sipponen	Discus throw	56.47	17	Did not advance	
Sara Killinen	Hammer throw	NM	–	Did not advance	
Silja Kosonen	Hammer throw	68.25	9 q	69.45	5
Krista Tervo	Hammer throw	67.80	11 q	67.85	8
Anni-Linnea Alanen	Javelin throw	52.09	23	Did not advance	
Sanne Erkkola	Javelin throw	54.04	20	Did not advance	

Combined events – Heptathlon

Athlete	Event	100H	HJ	SP	200 m	LJ	JT	800 m	Final	Rank
Saga Vanninen	Result	13.74	1.74	15.08 PB	25.01	5.99	43.95	2:22.76 PB	6045	10
Saga Vanninen	Points	1015	903	866	886	846	743	786	6045	10

== Beach volleyball ==
Finland qualified 1 male and 2 female pairs.

Athlete	Event	Preliminary round			Round of 24	Round of 16	Quarterfinals	Semifinals	Final / BM	
Athlete	Event	Opposition Score	Opposition Score	Rank	Opposition Score	Opposition Score	Opposition Score	Opposition Score	Opposition Score	Rank
Jyrki Nurminen; Santeri Sirén	Men's	Nõlvak – Tiisaar (EST); L 0–2	Lupo – Ranghieri (ITA); L 1–2	4	Did not advance					
Niina Ahtiainen; Vilhelmiina Prihti	Women's	Álvarez Mendoza – Moreno (ESP); L 1–2	Vieira – Chamereau (FRA); W 2–0	3	Kociolek – Lodej (POL); L 0–2	Did not advance				
Taru Lahti-Liukkonen; Anniina Parkkinen	Women's	Placette – Richard (FRA); W 2–1	Graudina – Kravcenoka (LAT); L 0–2	2	Breidenbach – Orsi Toth (ITA); L 0–2	Did not advance				

== Canoe sprint ==
Qualification Legend: SF = Qualified for Semi-finals; BT = Qualified by Time; FA = Qualify to final (medal); FB = Qualify to final B (non-medal), KO = Last Place Knock Out

Men

Athlete	Event	Heats		Semifinals		Final	
Athlete	Event	Time	Rank	Time	Rank	Time	Rank
Joona Mäntynen	K-1 200 m	36.776	6 SF	36.952	6	Did not advance	
Otto Sivula; Joona Mäntynen	K-2 200 m	33.671	7 SF	33.905	5	Did not advance	
Jeremy Hakala	K-1 500 m	1:45.199	4 SF	1:48.919	8	Did not advance	
Eetu Kolehmainen; Jeremy Hakala	K-2 500 m	1:38.214	6 SF	1:32.962	7 FB	1:34.068	16
Eetu Kolehmainen	K-1 1000 m	3:53.474	7 SF	3:49.658	9	Did not advance	
Jeremy Hakala	K-1 5000 m	—N/a				KO	13

Women

Athlete	Event	Heats		Semifinals		Final	
Athlete	Event	Time	Rank	Time	Rank	Time	Rank
Netta Malinen	K-1 500 m	2:01.319	6 SF	1:56.802	6 FB	2:00.125	15
Sara Mihalik; Netta Malinen	K-2 500 m	1:57.711	6 SF	1:48.010	8 BT	1:51.192	17
Sara Mihalik	K–1 5000 m	—N/a				22:57.201	4

== Cycling ==
=== Road ===
Women

Athlete	Event	Time	Rank
Antonia Gröndahl	Road race	2:59:58	57
Laura Vainionpää	Road race	3:02:21	64

== Gymnastics ==
Finland has entered 5 men and 5 women.

=== Men ===
Qualification

Athlete	Event	Qualification								Final							
Athlete	Event	Apparatus						Total	Rank	Apparatus						Total	Rank
Athlete	Event	F	PH	R	V	PB	HB	Total	Rank	F	PH	R	V	PB	HB	Total	Rank
Tarmo Kanerva	Team	—N/a	12.233	12.333	13.466	12.400	12.233	—N/a		—N/a							
Oskar Kirmes	Team	11.566	12.400	12.700	12.700	13.233	12.866	75.465	51	—N/a							
Robert Kirmes	Team	13.833	13.266	13.266	13.000	12.933	13.400	79.698	22	—N/a							
Elias Koski	Team	13.200	13.233	12.966	13.633	13.400	13.266	79.698	23	—N/a							
Emil Soravuo	Team	14.133	—N/a							—N/a							
Total	Team	41.166	38.899	38.932	40.099	39.566	39.532	238.194	14	—N/a							

=== Women ===
Qualification

Athlete	Event	Qualification						Final					
Athlete	Event	Apparatus				Total	Rank	Apparatus				Total	Rank
Athlete	Event	V	UB	BB	F	Total	Rank	V	UB	BB	F	Total	Rank
Ada Hautala	Team	12.733	12.633	9.700	12.100	47.166	47	—N/a					
Maisa Kuusikko	Team	13.333	13.466	12.533	12.866	52.198	11	—N/a					
Sani Mäkelä	Team	13.266	12.866	11.300	12.233	49.665	24	—N/a					
Kaia Tanskanen	Team	13.100	12.033	11.033	12.533	48.699	33	—N/a					
Total	Team	39.699	38.695	34.866	37.632	151.162	10	—N/a					

== Rowing ==
Men

Athlete	Event	Heats		Repechage		Semifinals		Final	
Athlete	Event	Time	Rank	Time	Rank	Time	Rank	Time	Rank
Kasper Hirvilampi	Lightweight single sculls	8:22.94	4 R	7:50.92	3 SA/B	7:31.13	6 FB	7:42.09	12

Qualification Legend: FA=Final A (medal); FB=Final B (non-medal); FC=Final C (non-medal); FD=Final D (non-medal); SA/B=Semifinals A/B; SC/D=Semifinals C/D; SE/F=Semifinals E/F; R=Repechage

Women

Athlete	Event	Heats		Repechage		Semifinals		Final	
Athlete	Event	Time	Rank	Time	Rank	Time	Rank	Time	Rank
Eeva Karppinen	Single sculls	9:10.33	3 SA/B	Bye		8:33.96	6 FB	8:41.38	11

Qualification Legend: FA=Final A (medal); FB=Final B (non-medal); FC=Final C (non-medal); FD=Final D (non-medal); SA/B=Semifinals A/B; SC/D=Semifinals C/D; SE/F=Semifinals E/F; R=Repechage

== Sport climbing ==
Boulder

Athlete	Event	Qualification		Semifinal		Final	
Athlete	Event	Result	Rank	Result	Rank	Result	Rank
Laura Loikas	Women's boulder	0T0z 0 0	53	Did not advance			

== Table tennis ==
Athlete	Event	Group play stage	Preliminary round 1	Preliminary round 2	Round of 64	Round of 32	Round of 16	Quarterfinals	Semifinals	Final / BM	
Athlete	Event	Opposition Result	Opposition Result	Opposition Result	Opposition Result	Opposition Result	Opposition Result	Opposition Result	Opposition Result	Opposition Result	Rank
Alex Naumi	Men's singles	Giardi (SMR); W 3–0 Szudi (HUN); L 2–3 Reitspies (CZE); L 1–3	Did not advance								
Benedek Oláh	Men's singles	BYE			Redzimski (POL); L 3–4	Did not advance					
Ramona Betz	Women's singles	Men (NED); L 1–3 Degraef (BEL); L 0–3	Did not advance								
Anna Kirichenko	Women's singles	Hartbrich (HUN); L 0–3 Barbosa (LUX); W 3–0	Wegryz (POL); L 1–3	Did not advance							
Benedek Oláh; Alex Naumi	Men's doubles	—N/a		BYE		Zeljko/Kojic (CRO); L 2–3	Did not advance				
Ramona Betz; Anna Kirichenko	Women's doubles	—N/a		BYE		Toliou/Moret (MIX); L 1–3	Did not advance				
Daniels Kogans (LAT); Ramona Betz	Mixed doubles	—N/a		BYE	Smirnov/Hanson (EST); L 1–3	Did not advance					
Alex Naumi; Anna Kirichenko	Mixed doubles	—N/a		BYE	Konstantinopoulos/Toliou (GRE); L 1–3	Did not advance					
Benedek Oláh; Eerland Britt (NED)	Mixed doubles	—N/a		Nielsen/Musajeva (MIX); W 3–0	—N/a	Wang/Kukulkova (SVK); L 1–3	Did not advance				

== Triathlon ==
Athlete	Event	Swim (1.5 km)	Trans 1	Bike (40 km)	Trans 2	Run (10 km)	Total Time	Rank
Julia Kekkonen	Women's	22:45	0:38	LAP				
