= Toni Keränen =

Finnish javelin thrower (born 1998)

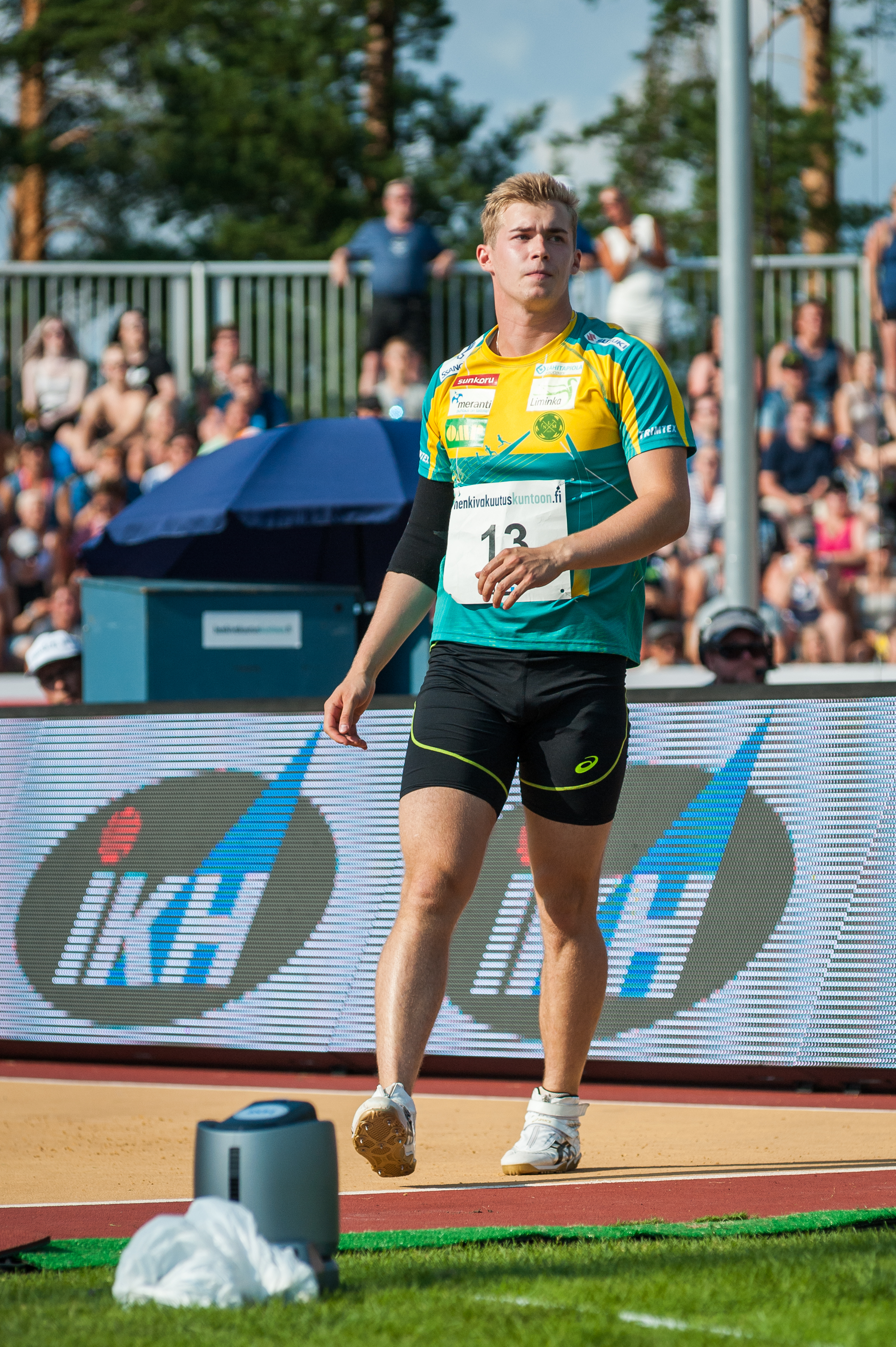
- Keränen at the 2018 Finnish Athletics Championships

Personal information
- Full name: Toni Tuomas Keränen
- Nationality: Finland
- Born: 16 June 1998 (age 28)
- Home town: Liminka, Finland
- Height: 185 cm (6 ft 1 in)
- Weight: 85 kg (187 lb)

Sport
- Sport: Athletics
- Event: Javelin throw
- Club: Limingan Niittomiehet
- Coached by: Petteri Piironen; Jorma Markus; Timo Keränen; Hannu Kangas

Achievements and titles
- National finals: 2014 Finnish U18s; • Javelin throw (700g), 1st (gold); 2015 Finnish U18s; • Javelin throw (700g), 1st (gold); 2016 Finnish U20s; • Javelin throw, 1st (gold); 2017 Finnish U20s; • Javelin throw, 1st (gold); 2018 Finnish Champs; • Javelin throw, 2nd (silver); 2018 Finnish U23s; • Javelin throw, 1st (gold); 2019 Finnish Champs; • Javelin throw, 7th; 2019 Finnish U23s; • Javelin throw, 1st (gold); 2020 Finnish Champs; • Javelin throw, 7th; 2020 Finnish U23s; • Javelin throw, 3rd (bronze); 2021 Finnish Champs; • Javelin throw, 5th; 2022 Finnish Champs; • Javelin throw, 3rd (bronze); 2023 Finnish Champs; • Javelin throw, 6th
- Personal bests
- Updated on 15 January 2024

Toni Tuomas Keränen (born 16 June 1998) is a Finnish javelin thrower. He is two-time Finnish Athletics Championships medallist, the Finnish national record holder in the U18 javelin throw, and he has represented Finland at the World Athletics Championships and other international competitions.

== Biography ==
Keränen won the under-18 Finnish national championship in 2015 with a result of 81.39 m, which was nearly three meters better than the winning result of the same year's under-18 World Championships. In August 2015, Keränen threw a new Finnish record for his age group of 83.29 m in his hometown. He placed tenth at the Grosseto under-20 European Championships in 2017. Keränen won the silver medal at the 2018 Finnish Athletics Championships with a result of 78.86 m.

Keränen's first global championship was at the Eugene World Championships in 2022. In the qualification, he threw 78.52 m, which was not far enough to advance to the finals. He won silver the same year at the Finnish Athletics Championships and was eliminated in qualification at the Munich European Championships with a result of 71.24 m.

Keränen has also played competitive pesäpallo (Finnish baseball) and competed in other athletics events, winning youth national championships in the long jump, 100 metres, and pentathlon.

Since fall 2021, Keränen has been coached by Petteri Piironen. Previously, he was coached by Jorma Markus, Timo Keränen and Hannu Kangas.

== Statistics ==
=== Best performances ===
Event	Mark	Place	Competition	Venue	Date	Ref
Javelin throw	82.89 m	1st place, gold medalist(s)	Finnish: Valkean Kaupungin Kisat	Oulu, Finland	26 June 2022	
Javelin throw (700 g)	83.29 m NU18R	1st place, gold medalist(s)		Liminka, Finland	19 August 2015	
