= Heta Tuuri =

Finnish high jumper (born 1995)

Personal information
- Full name: Heta Maarit Tuuri
- Born: 14 January 1995 (age 31)
- Home town: Lahti, Finland
- Education: Salpausselän Lukio; University of Minnesota
- Height: 185 cm (6 ft 1 in)
- Weight: 65 kg (143 lb)

Sport
- Sport: Athletics
- Event: High jump
- College team: Minnesota Golden Gophers
- Club: Lahden Ahkera; Turun Urheiluliitto

Achievements and titles
- National finals: 2012 Finnish U18s; • High jump, 2nd (silver); 2013 Finnish Indoors; • High jump, 8th; 2013 Finnish Indoor U20s; • High jump, 2nd (silver); 2013 Finnish Champs; • High jump, =5th; 2013 Finnish U20s; • High jump, 1st (gold); 2014 Finnish Indoor U20s; • High jump, 1st (gold); 2014 Finnish Indoors; • High jump, 4th; 2014 Finnish Champs; • High jump, 3rd (bronze); 2014 Finnish U20s; • High jump, 1st (gold); 2015 Finnish Champs; • High jump, 4th; 2015 Finnish U23s; • High jump, 3rd (bronze); 2016 NCAAs; • High jump, 17th; 2017 Finnish Champs; • High jump, =9th; 2018 NCAAs; • High jump, 12th; 2019 Finnish Indoors; • High jump, 4th; 2019 Finnish Champs; • High jump, 2nd (silver); 2020 Finnish Indoors; • High jump, 2nd (silver); 2020 Finnish Champs; • High jump, 1st (gold); 2021 Finnish Champs; • High jump, 2nd (silver); 2022 Finnish Indoors; • High jump, 2nd (silver); 2022 Danish Indoors; • High jump, 1st (gold); 2022 Finnish Champs; • High jump, 1st (gold); 2023 Finnish Indoors; • High jump, 1st (gold); 2023 Finnish Champs; • High jump, 2nd (silver); 2024 Finnish Indoors; • High jump, 2nd (silver)
- Personal best: HJ: 1.90m (2022)
- Updated on 20 February 2024

Heta Maarit Tuuri (born 14 January 1995) is a Finnish high jumper. She is a two-time winner of the Finnish Athletics Championships, the 2023 champion of the Finnish Indoor Athletics Championships, and has represented Finland at two editions of the World Athletics Championships.

== Career ==
=== 2013–2018 ===
In July 2013, Tuuri competed at the European U20 Championships in Rieti, where she placed 10th with a jump of 1.78 meters. In July 2014, she improved her personal best to 1.85 meters during a competition in Kuortane. Later that month, Tuuri finished 24th in qualification at the World U20 Championships in Eugene with a jump of 1.79 meters, which was insufficient to advance to the final. In August, she won bronze at the Finnish Athletics Championships in Kuopio with a jump of 1.82 meters.

From 2015 to 2018, Tuuri studied at the University of Minnesota and competed in the NCAA Division I for the Minnesota Golden Gophers. She qualified for two NCAA Division I Women's Outdoor Track and Field Championships, achieving a best finish of 12th at the 2018 edition. Tuuri also competed in the triple jump during college, recording a lifetime best of 11.17 meters.

=== 2019–2022 ===
In July 2019, Tuuri set a new personal best of 1.88 meters during a competition in Tampere, placing her 10th all-time among Finnish athletes. The following month, she won silver at the 2019 Finnish Athletics Championships in Lappeenranta with a jump of 1.84 meters. In February 2020, she earned silver at the Finnish Indoor Championships in Tampere with a jump of 1.85 meters. In August of the same year, Tuuri won her first national title in Turku, jumping 1.86 meters.

In August 2021, Tuuri earned silver at the Tampere Finnish Athletics Championships with a jump of 1.87 meters. In February 2022, she also took silver at the Finnish Indoor Championships in Kuopio. In May 2022, Tuuri improved her personal best to 1.90 meters during a competition in Lahti. At the 2022 European Athletics Championships, Tuuri finished 15th in qualification, 5 cm short of the mark needed to advance to the finals. In July 2022, at the World Championships in Eugene, she did not advance from the qualifiers, finishing in 21st place with a jump of 1.86 meters. The following month, at the 2022 Finnish Athletics Championships, Tuuri won her second national title with a mark of 1.88 meters.

=== 2023-2024 ===
Tuuri opened her 2023 season with an indoor best of 1.90 meters. In her first European Indoor Championships, Tuuri finished 13th in qualification. She also competed at the 2023 World Athletics Championships, finishing 32nd in the first round of jumping with a best mark of 1.80 meters.

Tuuri finished runner-up at the 2024 Finnish Indoor Athletics Championships on 18 February.

== Personal life ==
Tuuri is from Lahti, Finland, where she attended Salpausselän Lukio high school. She was originally a part of Lahden Ahkera, but later switched to Turun Urheiluliitto.

In 2015, despite knowing little English, Tuuri moved to Minnesota, where she studied architecture at the University of Minnesota with the hope of owning her own practice.

== Statistics ==
=== Personal best progression ===
High Jump progression
#	Mark	Pl.	Competition	Venue	Date	Ref.
1	1.65 m	2nd place, silver medalist(s)		Tampere, Finland	13 Mar 2010	
2	1.68 m	3rd place, bronze medalist(s)		Tampere, Finland	27 Jan 2011	
3	1.70 m	1st place, gold medalist(s)	Kotka - U18 Events	Kotka, Finland	12 Jul 2011	
4	1.71 m	2nd place, silver medalist(s)	Finnish U18 Championships	Espoo, Finland	17 Aug 2012	
5	1.75 m	2nd place, silver medalist(s)	Finnkampen	Göteborg, Sweden	31 Aug 2012	
6	1.76 m	1st place, gold medalist(s)	Tampere U20 Championships	Tampere, Finland	12 Jun 2013	
7	1.77 m	1st place, gold medalist(s)	Espoo Youth Athletics Games	Espoo, Finland	15 Jun 2013	
8	1.81 m	1st place, gold medalist(s)		Keuruu, Finland	20 Jun 2013	
9	1.82 m	1st place, gold medalist(s)		Orimattila, Finland	13 Jul 2013	
10	1.87 m	1st place, gold medalist(s)	Aktia Games	Raasepori, Finland	15 Jun 2019	
11	1.88 m	1st place, gold medalist(s)	Pm-Kilpailut	Tampere, Finland	22 Jul 2019	
12	1.90 m	1st place, gold medalist(s)	Motonet GP	Lahti, Finland	24 May 2022	
