= 2018 Finnish Athletics Championships =

- Dates: 19–22 June 2018
- Host city: Jyväskylä, Finland
- Venue: Harjun stadion
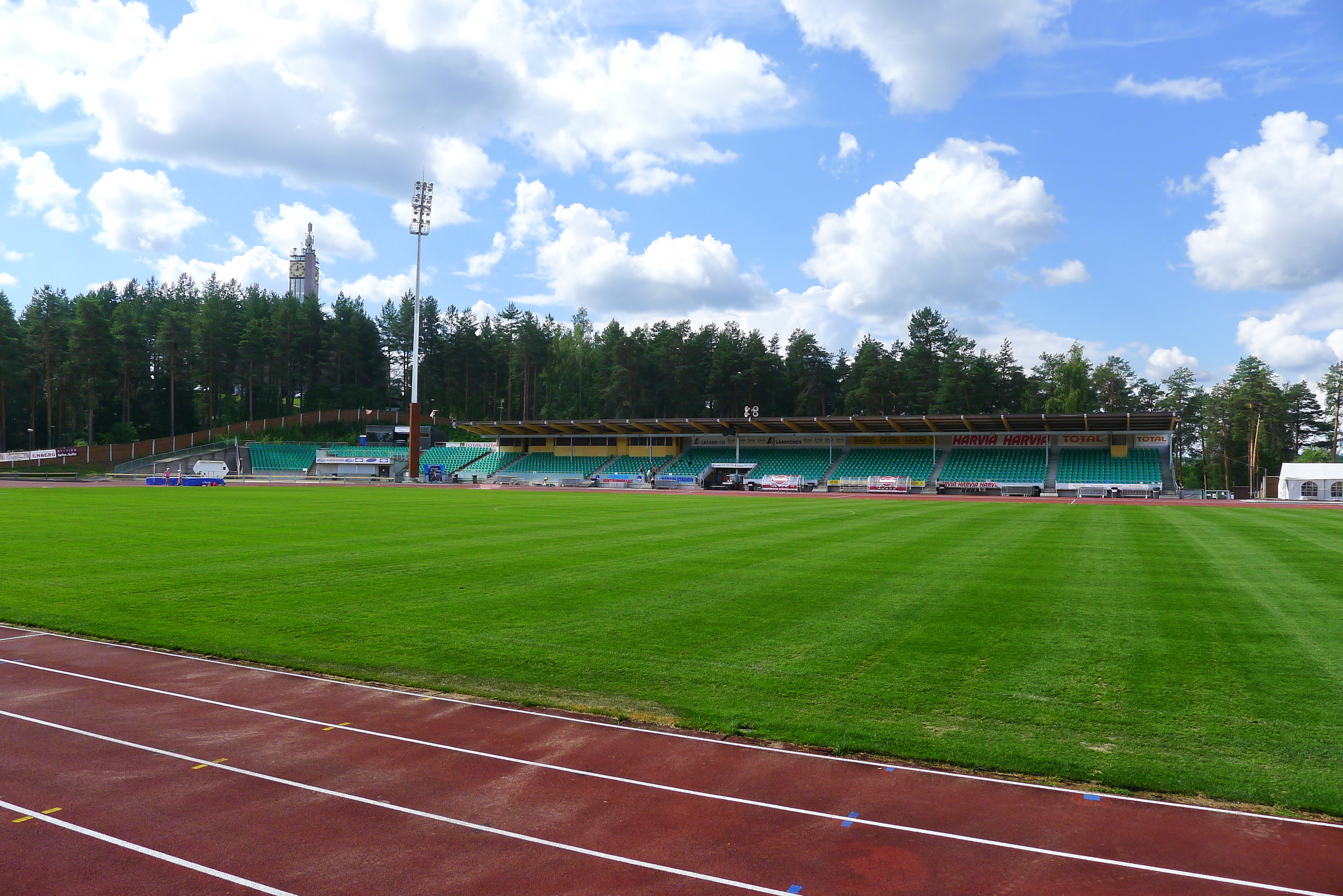

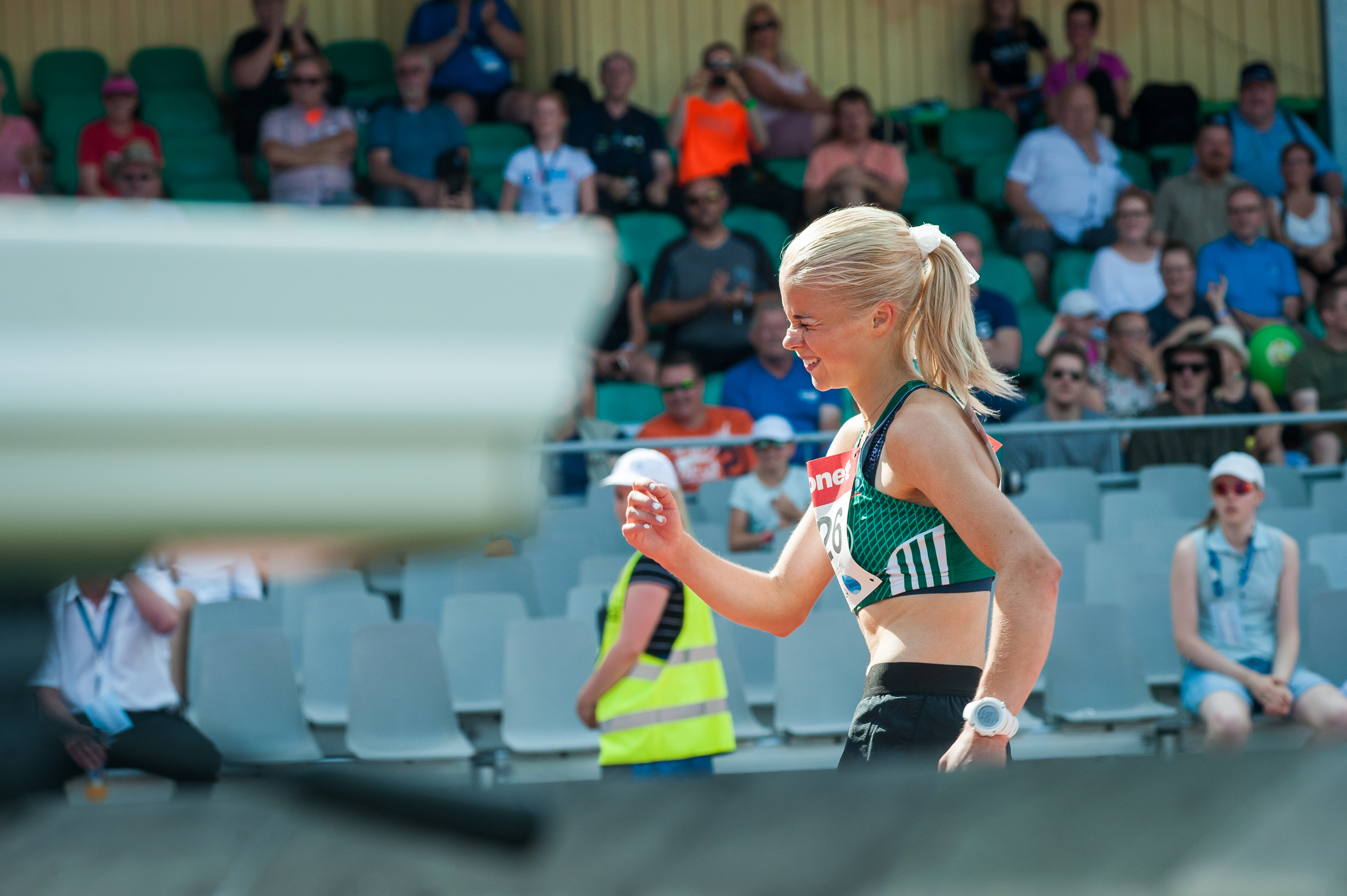
Alisa Vainio at the Women's 5000 m

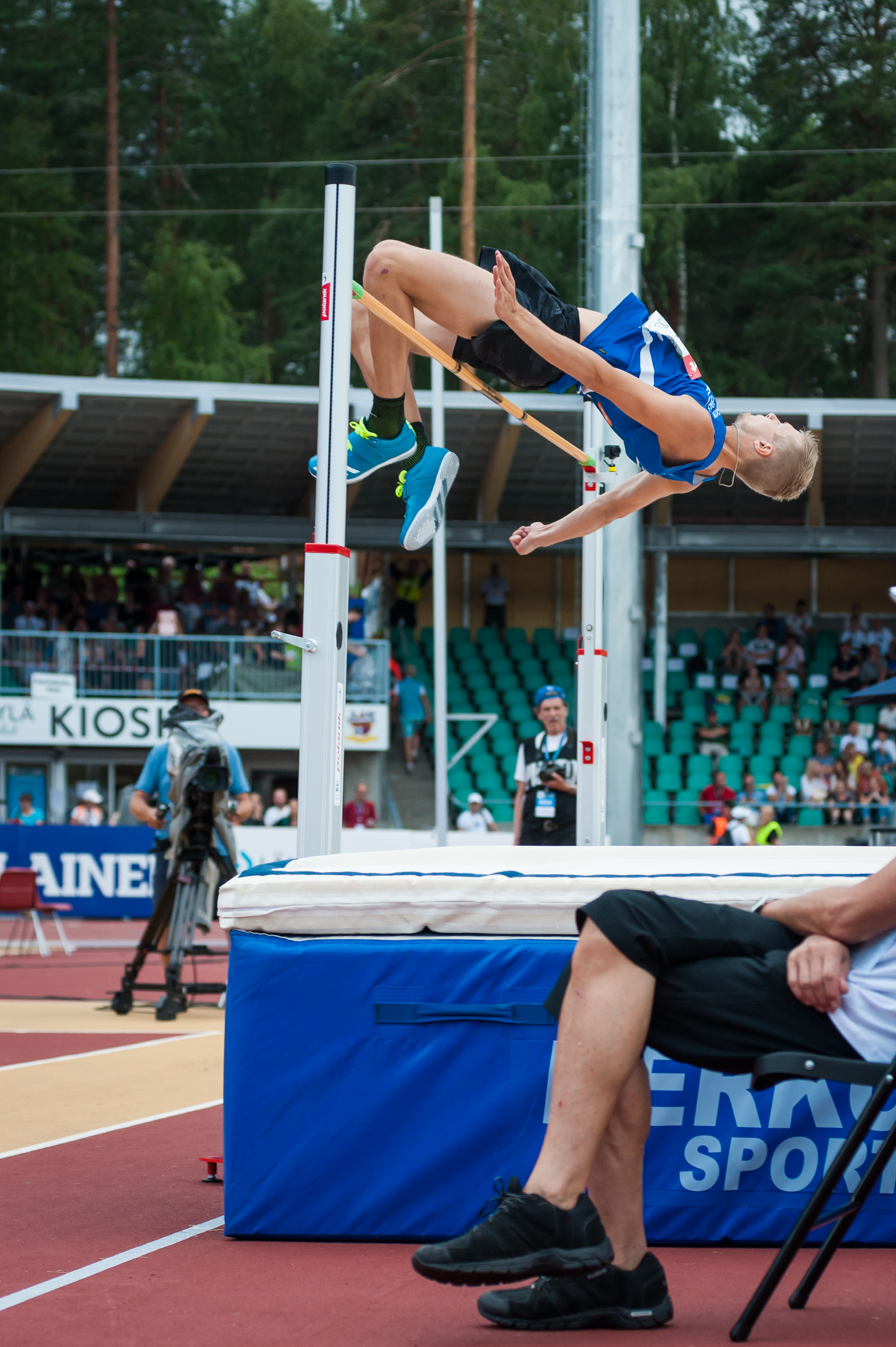
Samuli Eriksson at the Men's High Jump

The 2018 Finnish Athletics Championships (also known as Kalevan Kisat) were held at the Harjun stadion in Jyväskylä on 19–22 June 2018.

== Results ==
Event	Men's Track Winners		Women's Track Winners	
Event	Name	Mark	Name	Mark
100 metres July 21	Eetu Rantala	10.58	Anniina Kortetmaa	11.82
200 metres July 22	Oskari Lehtonen	21.07	Milja Thureson	23.65
400 metres July 19 – 20	Markus Teijula	47.77	Aino Pulkkinen	54.07
800 metres July 21 – 22	Markus Teijula	1:49.38	Sara Kuivisto	2:02.14
1,500 metres July 20	Joonas Rinne	3:52.55	Sara Kuivisto	4:27.22
5,000 metres July 21 – 22	Arttu Vattulainen	14:02.95	Kristiina Mäki	16:11.72
10,000 metres July 19	Jaakko Piesanen	30:09.87	Alisa Vainio	33:32.77
3,000 m Steeplechase; July 22	Topi Raitanen	8:44.28	Camilla Richardsson	9:51.46
110 m/100m Hurdles; July 20	Elmo Lakka	13.67	Nooralotta Neziri	12.92
400m Hurdles; July 21 – 22	Joni Vainio-Kaila	51.62	Viivi Lehikoinen	57.26
20 km/10 km Race Walk; July 19	Aku Partanen	1:26:45	Elisa Neuvonen	47:54
Event	Men's Field Winners		Women's Field Winners	
Event	Name	Mark	Name	Mark
High Jump; July 20 – 22	Samuli Eriksson	2.15 m	Eleriin Haas	1.88 m
Pole Vault; July 19 – 21	Urho Kujanpää	5.37 m	Wilma Murto	4.60 m
Long Jump; July 19 – 21	Kristian Bäck	7.93 m	Kira Kytölä	6.42 m
Triple Jump; July 20 – 22	Simo Lipsanen	16.27 m	Kristiina Mäkelä	14.31 m
Shot Put; July 19 – 21	Timo Kööpikkä	19.13 m	Senja Mäkitörmä	16.95 m
Discus Throw; July 19 – 22	Frantz Kruger	57.12 m	Sanna Kämäräinen	56.96 m
Hammer Throw; July 19 – 21	Henri Liipola	72.13 m	Krista Tervo	68.60 m
Javelin Throw; July 20 – 22	Oliver Helander	78.02 m	Jenni Kangas	57.09 m
Decathlon; July 21 – 22	Juuso Hassi	7512	—	—
Heptathlon; July 19 – 20	—	—	Maria Huntington	5858
