= Peiponen =

Peiponen is a Finnish surname. Notable people with the surname include:

- Johanna Peiponen (born 1990), Finnish long-distance runner
- Roni Peiponen (1997–2022), Finnish footballer
