= 2012 Finnish Athletics Championships =

- Dates: 23–26 August
- Host city: Lahti, Finland
- Venue: Lahti Stadium
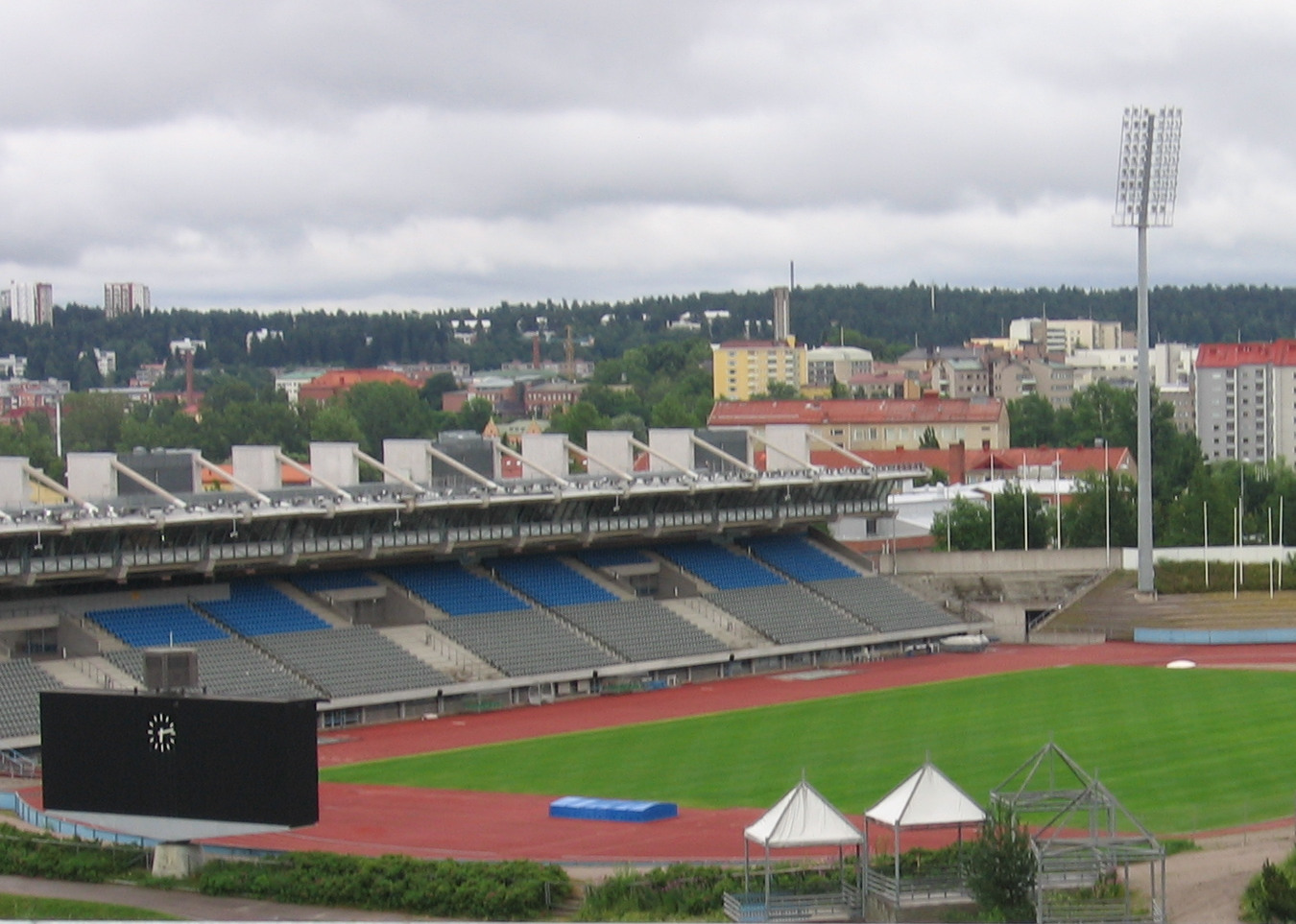

The 2012 Finnish Athletics Championships (Finnish: Kalevan Kisat 2012) was the 105th edition of the national outdoor track and field championships for Finland. It took place from 23 to 26 August 2012 at Lahti Stadium in Lahti.

== Results ==
=== Men ===
Event	Gold		Silver		Bronze	
100 m	Visa Hongisto	10.54	Eero Haapala	10.56	Jonathan Åstrand	10.66
200 m	Jonathan Åstrand	20.72	Visa Hongisto	21.11	Ville Myllymäki	21.53
400 m	Christoffer Envall	48.13	Antti Kokkonen	48.32	Jani Koskela	48.37
800 m	Niclas Sandells	1:52.72 min	Mikko Lahtio	1:53.05 min	Jonas Hamm	1:54.10 min
1500 m	Niclas Sandells	3:44.17 min	Mikael Bergdahl	3:45.56 min	Jonas Hamm	3:45.58 min
5000 m	Lewis Korir; Kenya	13:55.80 min	Jarkko Järvenpää	14:06.92 min	Willy Rotich; Kenya	14:07.17 min
10,000 m	Lewis Korir; Kenya	28:59.75 min	Willy Rotich; Kenya	30:07.18 min	Henri Manninen	30:18.65 min
110 m hurdles	Jussi Kanervo	13.94	Antti Korkealaakso	14.29	Arttu Hirvonen	14.37
400 m hurdles	Oskari Mörö	51.72	Petteri Monni	52.01	Gustav Klingestedt	52.28
3000 m s'chase	Joonas Harjamäki	8:58.94 min	Rami Tuokko	9:10.28 min	Aki Nurmela	9:18.13 min
20 km walk	Jarkko Kinnunen	1:26:17 h	Antti Kempas	1:27:44 h	Veli-Matti Partanen	1:29:52 h
High jump	Osku Torro	2.16 m	Jussi Viita	2.12 m	Richard Östman	2.06 m
Pole vault	Eemeli Salomäki	5.50 m	Jarno Kivioja Olli Rannikko	5.25 m	Not awarded	
Long jump	Roni Ollikainen	7.91 m	Eero Haapala	7.87 m	Tommi Evilä	7.71 m
Triple jump	Aleksi Tammentie	16.36 m	Kristian Pulli	15.59 m	Daniel Sjölind	15.18 m
Shot put	Tomas Söderlund	18.46 m	Robert Häggblom	18.37 m	Henri Pakisjärvi	18.18 m
Discus throw	Mikko Kyyrö	60.45 m	Jouni Waldén	55.96 m	Jouni Helppikangas	55.57 m
Hammer throw	Olli-Pekka Karjalainen	73.21 m	Tuomas Seppänen	70.78 m	Juha Kauppinen	69.34 m
Javelin throw	Antti Ruuskanen	87.79 m	Ari Mannio	84.62 m	Tero Pitkämäki	83.48 m
Decathlon	Sami Itani	7636 pts	Lassi Raunio	7440 pts	Thomas Barrineau	7236 pts

=== Women ===
Event	Gold		Silver		Bronze	
100 m	Hanna-Maari Latvala	11.74	Maria Räsänen	11.86	TiinA Leppäkoski	12.06
200 m	Hanna-Maari Latvala	23.38	Ella Räsänen	23.79	Maria Räsänen	24.10
400 m	Ella Räsänen	53.69	Sanna Aaltonen	55.27	Anniina Laitinen	55.45
800 m	Karin Storbacka	2:06.09 min	Johanna Matintalo	2:07.43 min	Heidi Marttinen	2:07.90 min
1500 m	Johanna Lehtinen	4:18.31 min	Suvi Selvenius	4:25.85 min	Kaisa Tyni	4:27.71 min
5000 m	Sandra Eriksson	16:16.04 min	Oona Kettunen	16:19.23 min	Laura Markovaara	16:21.41 min
10,000 m	Johanna Lehtinen	33:25.70 min	Laura Markovaara	33:32.96 min	Katarina Skräddar	35:21.35 min
100 m hurdles	Nooralotta Neziri	13.22	Elisa Leinonen	13.38	Matilda Bogdanoff	13.48
400 m hurdles	Anniina Laitinen	58.30	Venla Paunonen	58.36	Iona Punkkinen	58.41
3000 m s'chase	Sandra Eriksson	9:57.72 min	Oona Kettunen	9:59.38 min	Mira Tuominen	10:24.47 min
10 km walk	Karoliina Kaasalainen	46:58 min	Anne Halkivaha	48:10 min	Henrika Parviainen	51:47 min
High jump	Eleriin Haas; Estonia	1.88 m	Elina Smolander	1.86 m	Laura Rautanen	1.79 m
Pole vault	Minna Nikkanen	4.30 m	Enna Hassinen	3.85 m	Jatta Salmela	3.85 m
Long jump	Jaana Sieviläinen	6.23 m	Matilda Bogdanoff	6.04 m	Elina Torro	6.03 m
Triple jump	Elina Torro	13.48 m	Kristiina Mäkelä	13.48 m	Sanna Nygård	13.44 m
Shot put	Suvi Helin	15.01 m	Niina Kelo	14.94 m	Katri Hirvonen	14.84 m
Discus throw	Tanja Komulainen	55.09 m	Sanna Kämäräinen	54.44 m	Katri Hirvonen	52.67 m
Hammer throw	Merja Korpela	67.43 m	Johanna Salmela	64.10 m	Sini Latvala	63.41 m
Javelin throw	Oona Sormunen	59.14 m	Piia Pyykkinen	52.84 m	Sanni Utriainen	52.78 m
Heptathlon	Niina Kelo	5649 pts	Miia Kurppa	5459 pts	Tiina Säily	5315 pts
