= 2016 Finnish Athletics Championships =

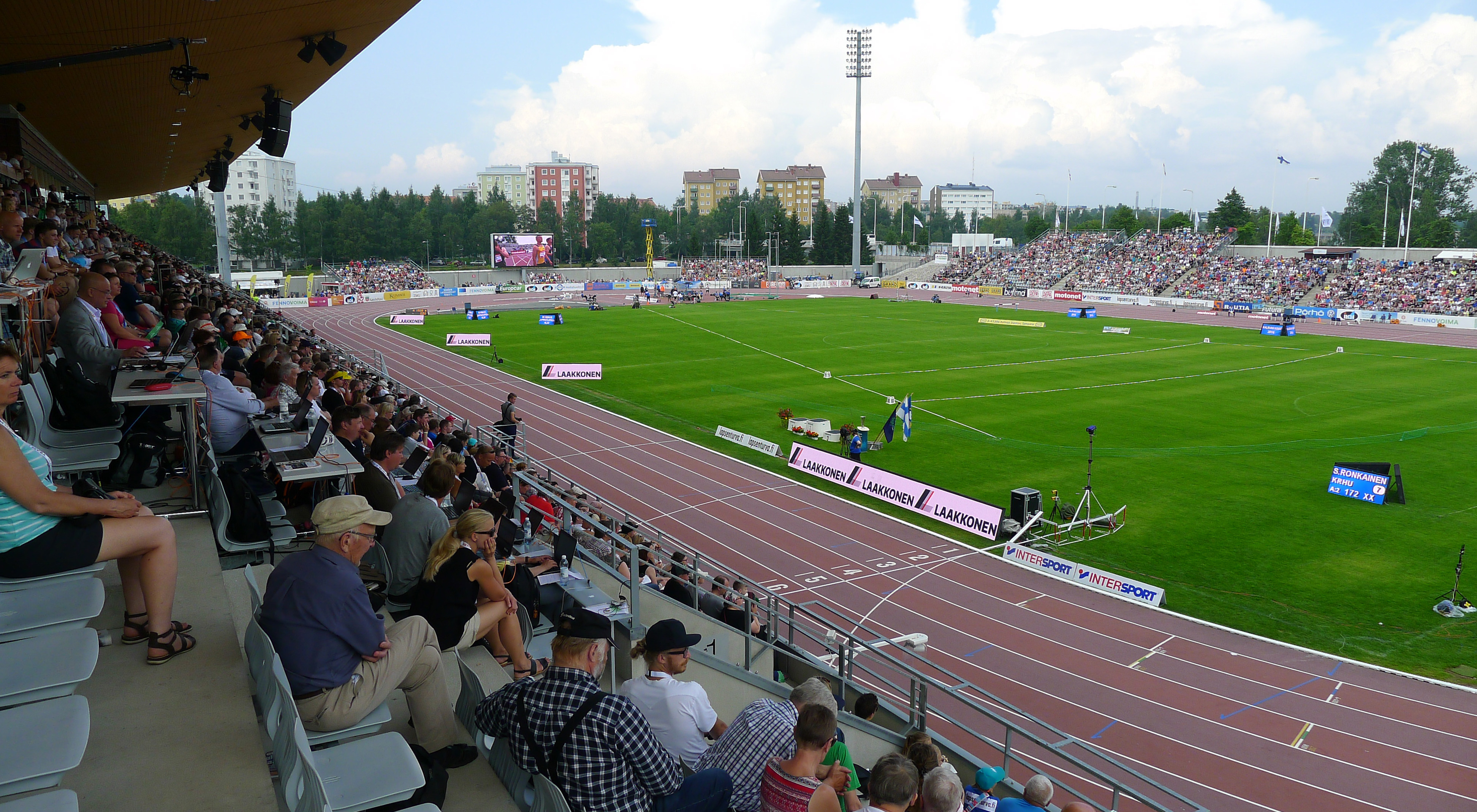
Crowd watching the Kaleva games 2016

Following are the results of the 2016 Finnish Athletics Championships. The games, known as Kalevan kisat in Finnish, were first held in Tampere in 1907. The 2016 events were held July 21st through 24th in Oulu.

== Results ==
| Event | Men's Track Winners | | Women's Track Winners | |
| Event | Name | Mark | Name | Mark |
|---|---|---|---|---|
| 100 metres July 22 | Ville Myllymäki | 10.38 | Anna Hämäläinen | 11.69 |
| 200 metres July 24 | Samuli Samuelsson | 21.10 | Anna Hämäläinen | 23.70 |
| 400 metres July 23 | Ville Lampinen | 47.51 | Katri Mustola | 54.02 |
| 800 metres July 24 | Ville Lampinen | 1:49.60 | Sara Kuivisto | 2:10.59 |
| 1,500 metres July 22 – 23 | Marco Bertolotti | 3:45.33 | Kristiina Mäki | 4:30.32 |
| 5,000 metres July 22 – 24 | Ossi Kekki | 14:27.71 | Kristiina Mäki | 16:12.88 |
| 10,000 metres July 22 – 24 | Arttu Vattulainen | 29:33.70 | Camilla Richardsson | 33:43.53 |
| 110 m/100m Hurdles; July 23 | Elmo Lakka | 13.81 | Nooralotta Neziri | 13.05 |
| 400m Hurdles; July 24 | Petteri Monni | 51.50 | Hilla Uusimäki | 57.40 |
| 3,000 m Steeplechase; July 23 | Hannu Granberg | 8:58.60 | Sandra Eriksson | 9:40.70 |
| 20 km/10 km Race Walk; July 21 | Aleksi Ojala | 1:25:37 | Elisa Neuvonen | 47:47 |
| Event | Men's Field Winners | | Women's Field Winners | |
| Event | Name | Mark | Name | Mark |
| High Jump; July 23 – 24 | Jussi Viita | 2.21 m | Linda Sandblom | 1.84 m |
| Pole Vault; July 23 – 24 | Tomas Wecksten | 5.42 m | Minna Nikkanen | 4.40 m |
| Long Jump; July 22 – 23 | Roni Ollikainen | 7.80 m | Kristiina Vuorvirta | 6.22 m |
| Triple Jump; July 24 | Tuomas Kaukolahti | 16.24 m | Kristiina Mäkelä | 13.86 m |
| Shot Put; July 22 – 23 | Arttu Kangas | 19.38 m | Katri Hirvonen | 15.35 m |
| Discus Throw; July 22 – 24 | Pyry Niskala | 59.97 m | Salla Sipponen | 56.76 m |
| Hammer Throw; July 23 – 24 | David Söderberg | 76.64 m | Inga Linna | 67.15 m |
| Javelin Throw; July 23 – 24 | Tero Pitkämäki | 82.05 m | Heidi Nokelainen | 60.98 m |
| Decathlon; July 23 – 24 | Juuso Hassi | 7734 | — | — |
| Heptathlon; July 22 – 23 | — | — | Jutta Heikkinen | 5603 |
