= Finland at the 2018 European Championships =

- IOC code: FIN

in (United Kingdom) Glasgow (Germany) Berlin 2 August 2018 – 12 August 2018
- Competitors: 83 in 7 sports
- Medals Ranked 32nd: Gold 0 Silver 0 Bronze 1 Total 1

European Championships appearances
- 2018; 2022

Finland competed at the inaugural 7 sports 2018 European Championships from 2 to 12 August 2018. It competed in all sports.

== Medallists ==
Medal	Name	Sport	Event	Date
Bronze	Mimosa Jallow	Swimming	Women's 50 metre backstroke	5 August
