= Toni Kuusela =

Finnish javelin thrower (born 1994)

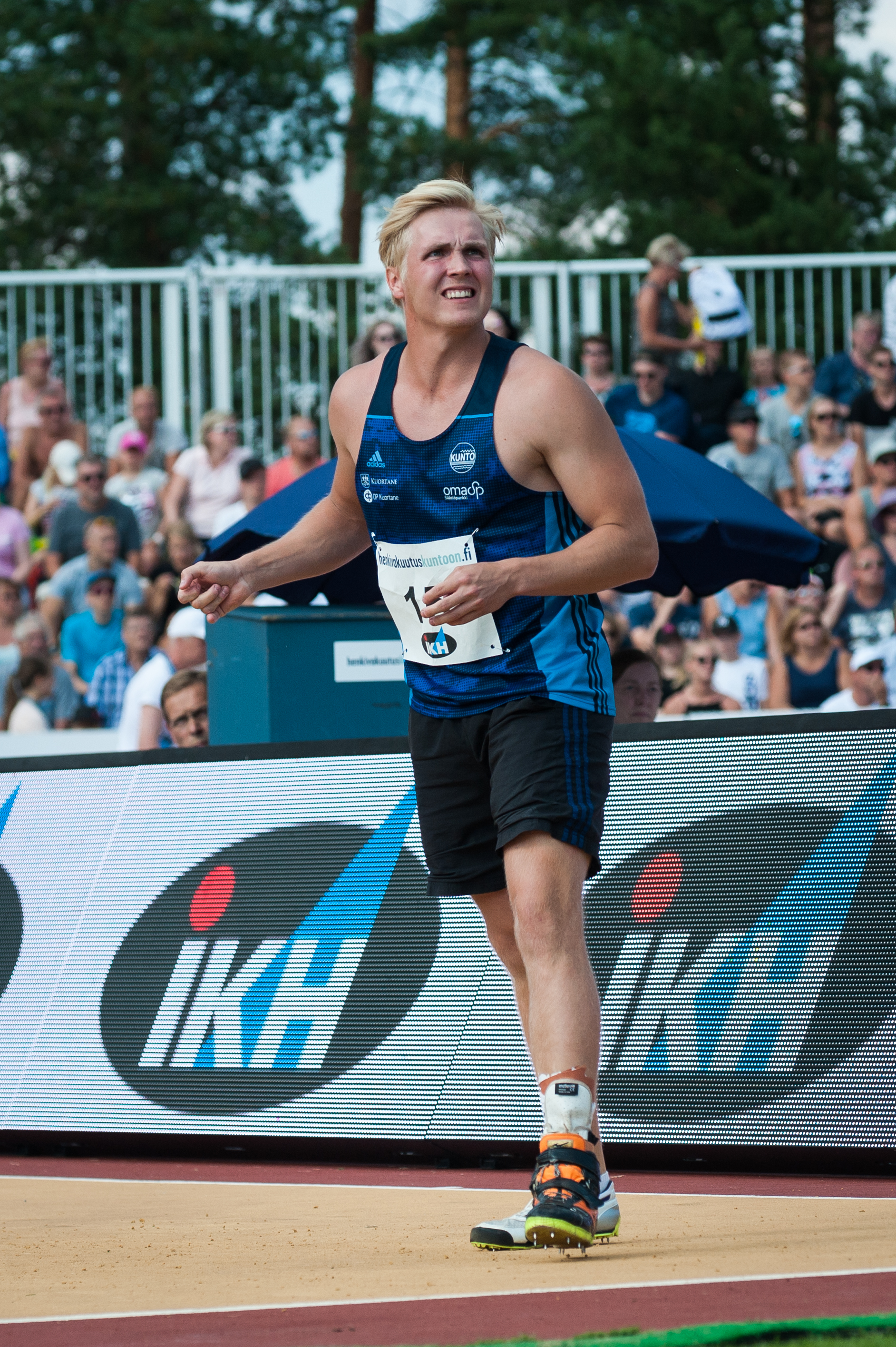

Personal information
- Full name: Toni Matti Kristian Kuusela
- Nationality: Finnish
- Born: 21 January 1994 (age 32) Vimpeli, Finland

Sport
- Sport: Athletics
- Event: Javelin throw

Achievements and titles
- Personal best: 85.03m (2021)

Toni Matti Kristian Kuusela (born 21 January 1994) is a Finnish athlete specializing in the javelin throw. He represented Finland at the 2020 Summer Olympics in the javelin throw.

== Career ==
Kuusela competed at the 2019 Finnish Athletics Championships and won a bronze medal in the javelin throw. He again competed at the 2020 Finnish Athletics Championships and won a bronze medal in the javelin throw.

Kuusela represented Finland at the 2020 Summer Olympics in the javelin throw.
