= Riku Illukka =

Finnish sprinter

Personal information
- Nationality: Finnish
- Born: 21 February 1999

Sport
- Sport: Athletics
- Event: Sprint
- Club: Vantaan Salamoe

Achievements and titles
- Personal bests: 60m: 6.60 (2026); 100m: 10.26 (2021); 200m: 20.76 (2025)

Riku Illukka (born 21 February 1999) is a Finnish sprinter. He is a multiple-time national champion having won titles over 60 metres, 100 metres and 200 metres.

== Biography ==
From Vantaa, he is a member of Vantaan Salamoe athletics club. He was a keen footballer before focusing on athletics. In 2017 in Espoo, Illukka won the Finnish Under-19 title in the 100 metres with a time of 10.67 seconds. The following year, Illukka ran a 200 metres personal best of 21.31 was set in Geneva.

He qualified for the 60 metres at the 2021 European Athletics Indoor Championships in Toruń, Poland, for his senior championship debut, running 6.79 seconds to place fifth in his heat. That summer, he lowered his personal best to 10.27 seconds for the 100 metres and won the Finnish Athletics Championships over 200 metres, and was selected for the 2021 European Athletics U23 Championships, in Tallinn.

In June 2024, he set a 100 metres personal best of 10.26 seconds and won the Finnish national title over that distance for the first time. In August 2025, he won the 200 metres title in 20.76 seconds at the Finnish Championships. He also placed third over 100 metres at the Championships.

Illukka set a new personal best for the 60 metres with a time of 6.60 seconds in February 2026. Running 6.68 seconds he won the 2026 Finnish Indoor title over 60 metres. In March 2026 at the 2026 World Athletics Indoor Championships in Toruń, Poland, Illukka competed in the men's 60 metres, and narrowly missed out on qualification to the semi-finals, running a time of 6.64 seconds in his heat, only two hundredths of a second behind the second place runner in his heat and a time equal to that of other heat qualifiers. He competed at the 2026 European Championships in Birmingham, England in August 2026, and was a semi-finalist of both the 100 metres and 200 metres. He also ran in the men's 4 x 100 metres relay at the championships.
