= Finnish Indoor Athletics Championships =

- Sport: Indoor track and field
- Founded: 1962
- Country: Finland

The Finnish Indoor Athletics Championships (Finnish: Yleisurheilun sisäratojen Suomen-mestaruuskilpailut) is an annual indoor track and field competition organised by the Finnish Amateur Athletic Association, which serves as the Finnish national championship for the sport. First held in 1962, the competition was open to non-Finnish athletes and several foreign athletes (mainly Swedes) were crowned as Finnish champions. The championship titles were restricted to Finnish nationals from 1987 onwards, with foreign competitors reduced to guest status only.

The competition features a 300 metres hurdles event, which highly uncommon as a senior national championship event. Furthermore, winter championships in discus throw and javelin throw are held each year in the same period, but are typically held outdoors due to venue constraints.

== Events ==
The following athletics events feature as standard on the Finnish Indoor Championships programme:

- Sprint: 60 m, 200 m, 400 m
- Distance track events: 800 m, 1500 m, 3000 m
- Hurdles: 60 m hurdles, 300 m hurdles
- Jumps: long jump, triple jump, high jump, pole vault
- Throws: shot put
- Combined events: heptathlon (men), pentathlon (women)
- Walks: 5000 m walk (men), 3000 m walk (women)

The 200 m was first introduced in 1982. A men's 5000 metres was held from 1973 to 1987. A men's 2000 metres steeplechase was held from 1962 to 1972, which is not a typical senior steeplechase distance but one which was also contested at the English AAA Indoor Championships in this period. The men's and women's 300 m hurdles was added in 1989. In throwing events, a men's weight throw was held in 1970 and winter discus and javelin contests began in 1986. The men's combined events was occasionally held as a sextathlon or octathlon prior to 1990. A women's pentathlon was added in 1980. Walking events were introduced in 1981.

The women's Finnish Championships programme was gradually expanded to match the men's events. Initially the competition had no distance championship events for women, with the 1500 metres being added in 1972, then the 3000 metres in 1982. Field events were also limited until the addition of a women's triple jump in 1991 and pole vault in 1995 (in line with changes made at the international level).

== Championships records ==
=== Men ===
Event	Record	Athlete/Team	Date	Championships	Place	Ref.
60 m						
300 m hurdles	35.62 OT NR	Antti Sainio	18 February 2024	2024 Championships	Tampere	

=== Women ===
Event	Record	Athlete/Team	Date	Championships	Place	Ref.
60 m	7.16 NR	Lotta Kemppinen	20 February 2021	2021 Championships	Jyväskylä	
1500 m	4:11.42	Sara Kuivisto	20 February 2021	2021 Championships	Jyväskylä	
60 m hurdles	7.83	Reetta Hurske	19 February 2023	2023 Championships	Helsinki	
300 m hurdles	40.57 OT NR	Essi Niskala	20 February 2022	2022 Championships	Kuopio	
