= Eero Haapala =

Finnish long jumper

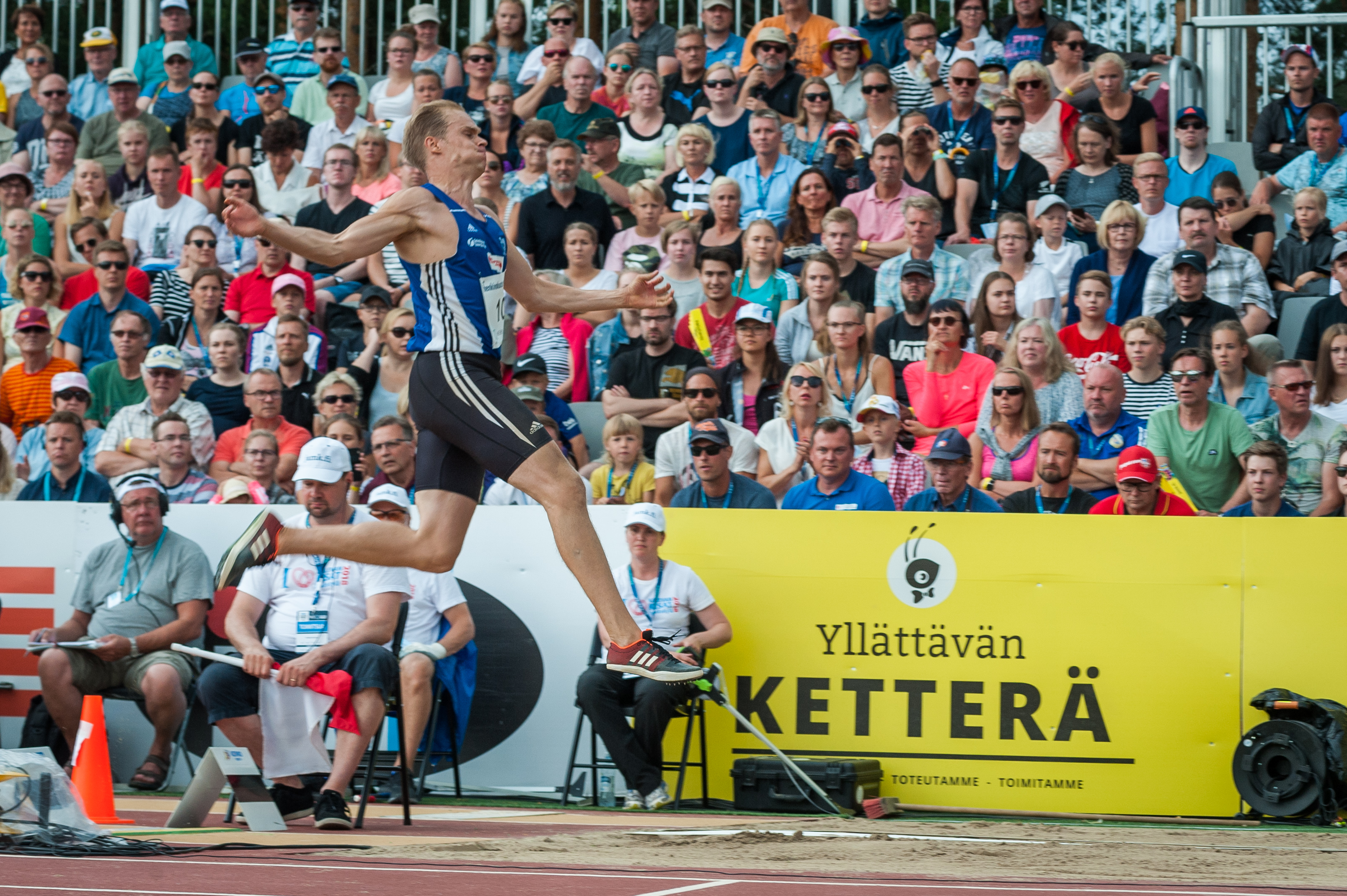
- Eero Haapala in 2018

Personal information
- Full name: Eero Antero Haapala
- Nationality: Finnish
- Born: 10 July 1989 (age 36) Jalasjärvi, Finland

Sport
- Country: Finland
- Sport: Athletics
- Event: Long jump
- Club: Ikaalisten Urheilijat
- Coached by: Antti Mäkelä -2015. Antti Mäkelä and Suren Ghazaryan 2015-2016. Suren Ghazaryan 2016-2018. Heikki Kyröläinen 2018-

Achievements and titles
- Personal best(s): 790 cm, Turku 2013 (outdoor); 811 cm, Pori 2013, (indoor)
- Updated on August 18, 2013

Eero Haapala (born 10 July 1989) is a Finnish long jumper. He is the current holder of Finnish indoor record of men's long jump.

At the 2013 European Athletics Indoor Championships in Gothenburg Haapala finished on fourth place. He withdrew the 2013 World Championships due to a repeating injury.
