= Finnish Athletics Championships =

Athletics Championships

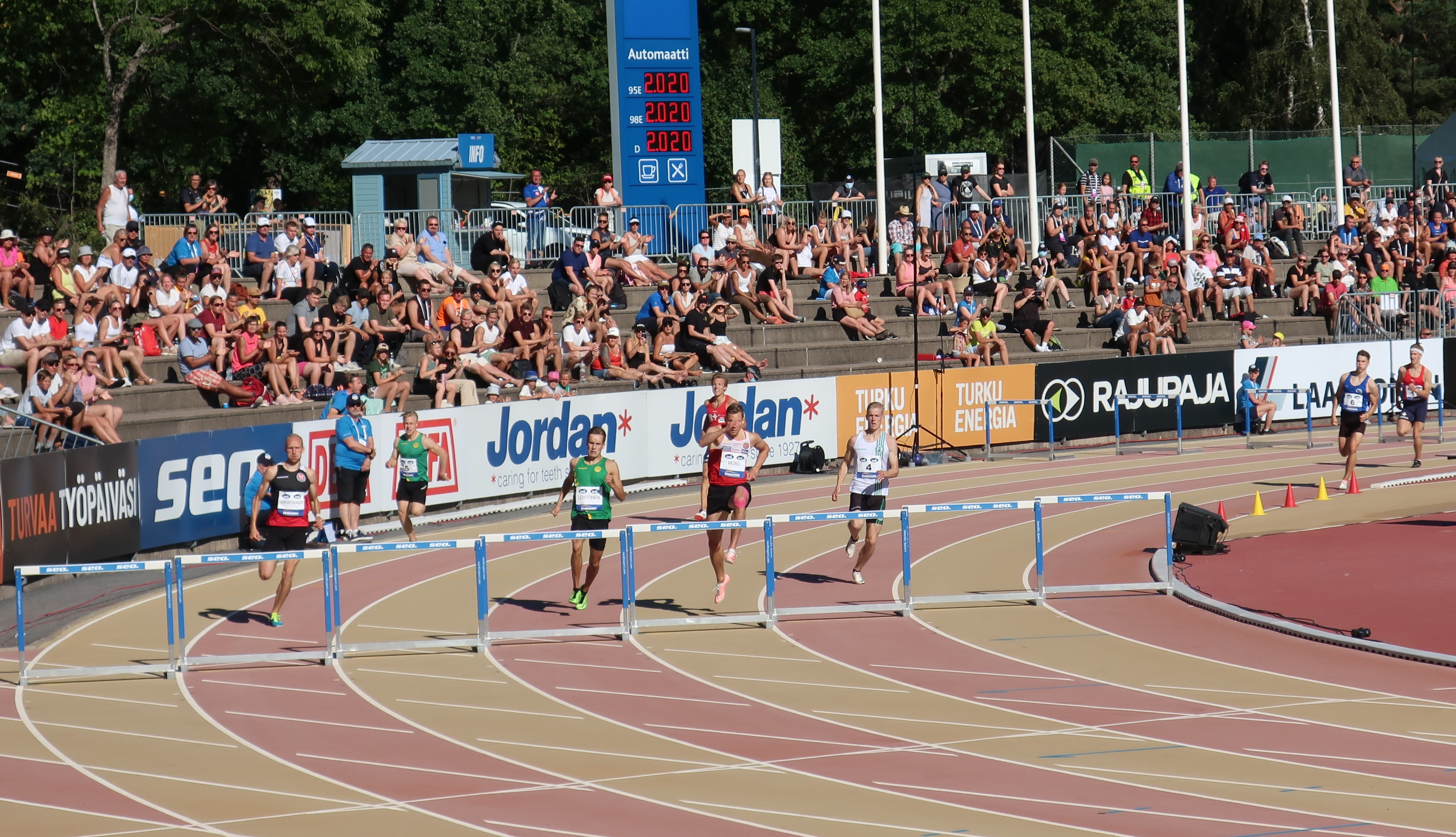
The top of the men's 400m hurdles race is coming to the eighth fence during the 2020 Finnish Athletics Championships at the Paavo Nurmi Stadium in Turku. Oskari Mörö, a silver medalist on the fourth track, is still short of Tuomas Lehtonen, a gold medalist on the fifth track, and Jonni Blomqvist, a bronze medalist on the third track.

The Finnish Athletics Championships, which are known as Kalevan kisat in Finnish, were first held in Tampere in 1907. Since then, they have been held in a different location every year. In the beginning, women were not allowed to compete in the Finnish Championships.

== The Kaleva Cup ==
In 1909, the personnel at the life insurance company Kaleva donated a trophy called the Kalevan malja or the Kaleva Cup to be awarded to and kept for until the next Championships by the team accumulating the most points during the competition.

In 1909, the Finnish Championships started to be informally referred to as the Kaleva Games because of the name of the cup. At the Championships held in Pori in 1915, the magazine Suomen Urheilulehti started to call the competition the Kaleva Games in its headlines. In 1937, at the Championships held in Vyborg, the Finnish athletics federation called Finnish Athletics (Suomen Urheiluliitto in Finnish) formally declared the name of the Finnish Championships to be the Kaleva Games.

== History ==
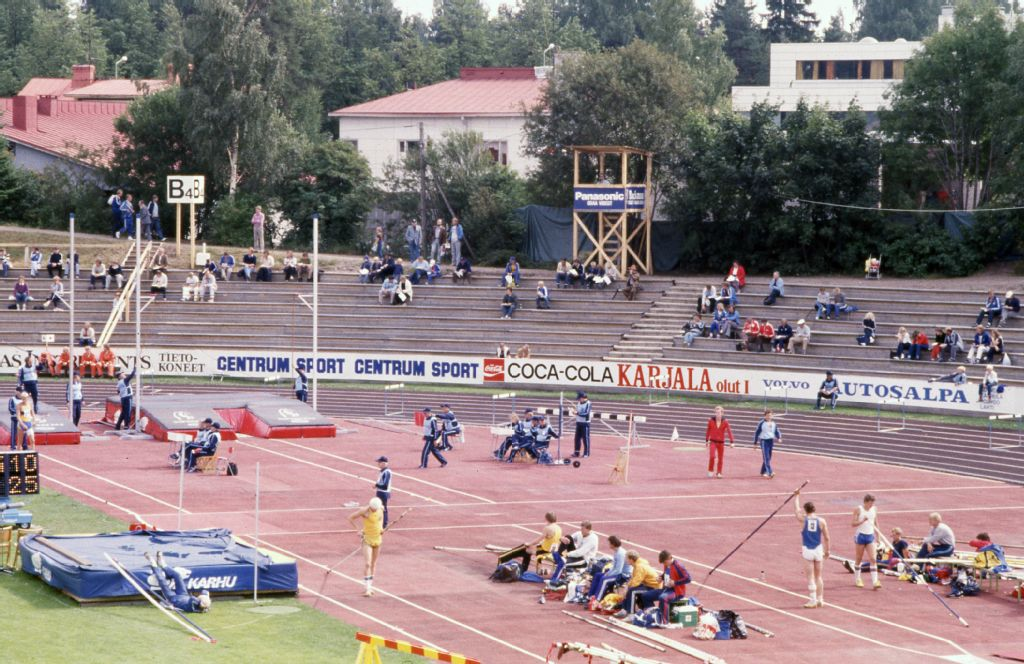
Finnish Athletics Championships in 1982

Edition	Venue	Dates
1907	Tampere	3–4 August
1908	Kuopio	29–30 August
1909	Helsinki	3–5 July
1910	Viipuri	2–3 July
1911	Tampere	15–16 July
1912	Turku	31 August–1 September
1913	Helsinki	19–20 July
1914	Helsinki	19–20 September
1915	Pori	14–15 August
1916	Helsinki	19–20 August
1917	Tampere	18–19 August
1918	Helsinki	31 August–1 September
1919	Turku	16–17 August
1920	Helsinki	3–4 July
1921	Kotka	20–21 August
1922	Helsinki	19–20 August
1923	Kuopio	18–19 August
1924	Lahti	23–24 August
1925	Viipuri	15–16 August
1926	Tampere	14–15 August
1927	Turku	20–21 August
1928	Helsinki	25–26 August
1929	Viipuri	17–18 August
1930	Tampere	16–17 August
1931	Helsinki	15–16 August
1932	Helsinki	6–7 August
1933	Turku	5–6 August
1934	Tampere	28–29 July
1935	Kotka	10–11 August
1936	Turku	22–23 August
1937	Viipuri	6–8 August
1938	Helsinki	6–8 August
1939	Helsinki	26–28 August
1940	Tampere	24–26 August
1941	–	–
1942	Helsinki	29–30 August
1943	Helsinki	14–15 August
1944	Helsinki	23–24 September
1945	Turku	11–12 August
1946	Helsinki	10–12 August
1947	Tampere	16–18 August
1948	Vaasa	21–22 August
1949	Kymi	20–21 August
1950	Jyväskylä	12–13 August
1951	Helsinki	19–20 August
1952	Seinäjoki	23–24 August
1953	Pori	15–16 August
1954	Turku	12–13 August
1955	Kuopio	13–14 August
1956	Lahti	25–26 August
1957	Tampere	17–18 August
1958	Kouvola	2–3 August
1959	Helsinki	16–17 August
1960	Hämeenlinna	13–14 August
1961	Mikkeli	12–13 August
1962	Lappeenranta	18–19 August
1963	Turku	17–18 August
1964	Oulu	15–16 August
1965	Jyväskylä	7–8 August
1966	Tampere	13–14 August
1967	Pori	11–13 August
1968	Varkaus	16–18 August
1969	Helsinki	16–18 August
1970	Kouvola	14–16 August
1971	Oulu	23–25 July
1972	Joensuu	11–13 August
1973	Hyvinkää	10–12 August
1974	Jyväskylä	9–11 August
1975	Seinäjoki	18–20 July
1976	Turku	2–4 July
1977	Tampere	29–31 July
1978	Kokkola	4–6 August
1979	Helsinki	11–13 August
1980	Lappeenranta	4–6 July
1981	Oulu	7–9 August
1982	Kouvola	13–15 August
1983	Pori	1–3 July
1984	Kajaani	6–8 July
1985	Lahti	16–18 August
1986	Vaasa	25–27 July
1987	Kuopio	14–16 August
1988	Hämeenlinna	5–7 August
1989	Turku	28–30 July
1990	Oulu	3–5 August
1991	Helsinki	27–29 July
1992	Jyväskylä	3–5 July
1993	Mikkeli	30 July–1 August
1994	Tuusula	8–10 July
1995	Lapua	20–23 July
1996	Tampere	4–7 July
1997	Lappeenranta	17–20 July
1998	Oulu	6–9 August
1999	Seinäjoki	5–8 August
2000	Lahti	17–20 August
2001	Turku	6–8 July
2002	Joensuu	18–21 July
2004	Vaasa	30 July–1 August
2005	Pori	15–17 July
2006	Jyväskylä	21–23 July
2003	Helsinki	9–11 August
2007	Lappeenranta	3–5 August
2008	Tampere	24–27 July
2009	Espoo	31 July–2 August
2010	Kajaani	5–8 August
2011	Turku	4–7 August
2013	Lahti	23–26 August
2013	Vaasa	25–27 August
2014	Kuopio	31 July–3 August
2015	Pori	30 July–2 August
2016	Oulu	21–24 July
2017	Seinäjoki	20–23 July
2018	Jyväskylä	19–22 July
2019	Lappeenranta	1–4 August
2020	Turku	13–16 August
2021	Tampere	26–29 August
2022	Joensuu	4–7 August
2023	Lahti	29–30 July
2024	Vaasa	

== Championships records ==
=== Women ===
Event	Record	Athlete	Date	Place	Ref.
100 m hurdles	12.79 (+1.0 m/s)	Annimari Korte	14 August 2020	Turku	
Pole vault	4.72 m NR	Wilma Murto	29 August 2021	Tampere	

== See also ==
- Finnish records in athletics
