= Tampereen Pyrintö =

Sports club from Tampere, Finland

- Founded: 1896
- President: Ilkka Vilonen
- Colors: White and red
- Website: tampereenpyrinto.fi/in-english/

Tampereen Pyrintö ry is a Finnish multi-sport club from Tampere. Pyrintö representatives have achieved several Olympic medals and other success. As of 2026, Pyrintö has sport sections in cross-country skiing, basketball, ski jumping, weightlifting, orienteering, athletics, cheerleading, and speed skating. In the past it has also had teams in pesäpallo and ice hockey.

== Sport sections ==
=== Athletics ===
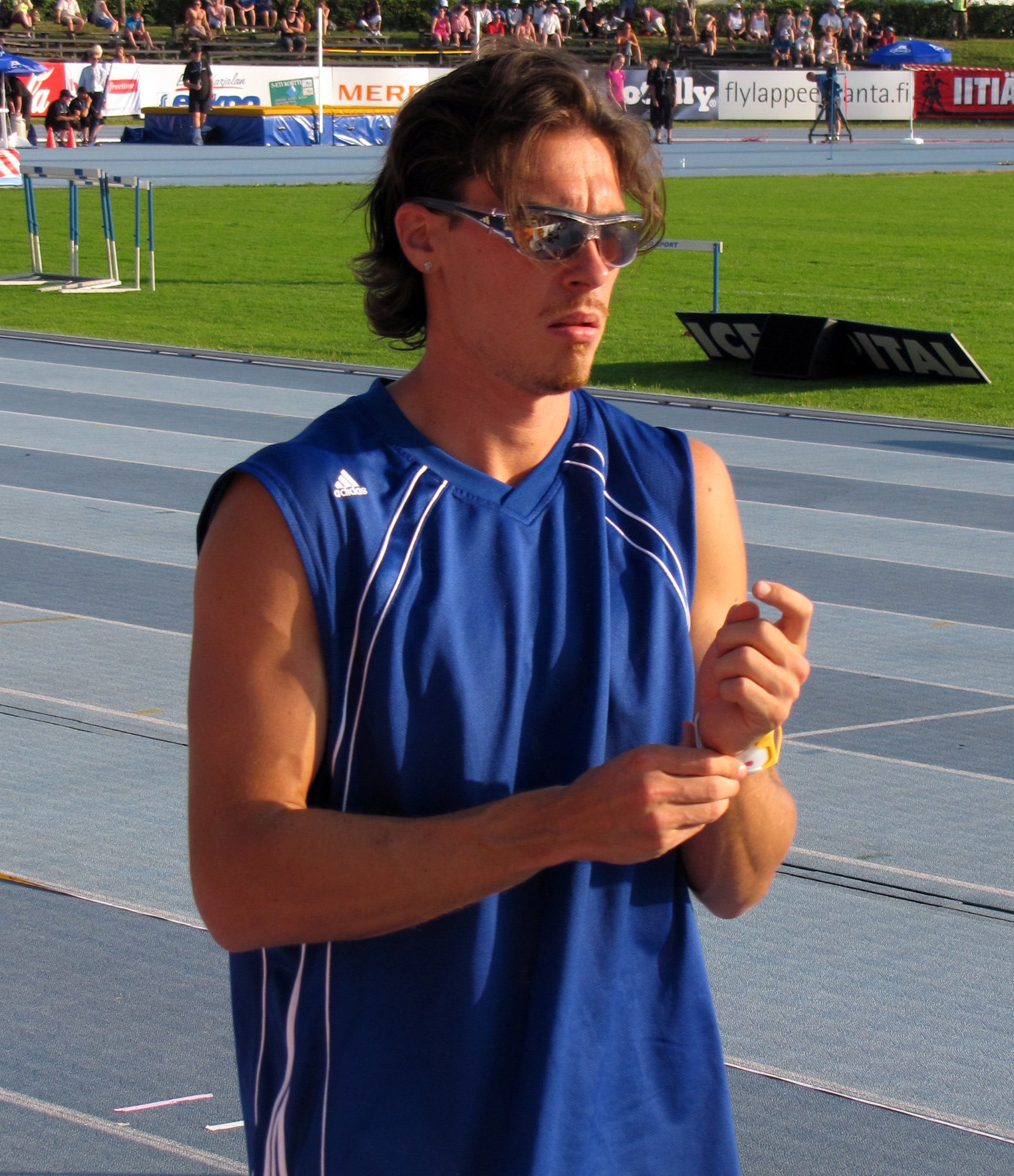
Tommi Evilä, long jumper and World bronze medalist from 2005

In athletics, Pyrintö is one of Finland's most successful clubs. Long jumper Tommi Evilä, javelin thrower Tero Järvenpää and hammer thrower Mia Strömmer have been club's internationally most notable athletes in recent years. In the past, Pyrintö athletes, like Akilles Järvinen, Eero Berg and Hugo Lahtinen, won several Olympic medals.

=== Basketball ===
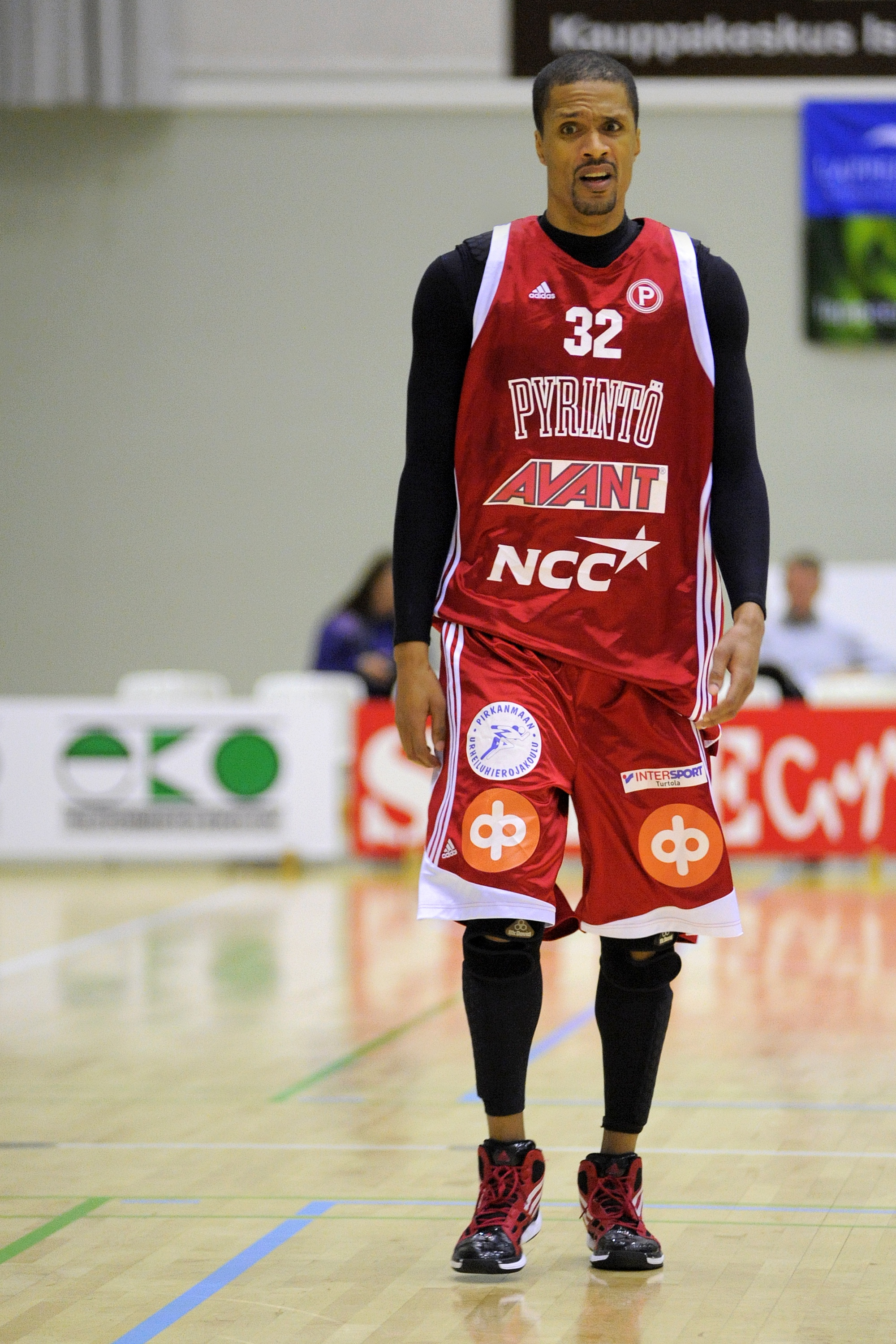
Damon Williams is among Pyrintö's most successful basketball players.

Pyrintö's men's basketball team was founded in 1941and plays in Korisliiga, the highest tier of Finnish basketball. It has won two titles (2010, 2011) and Finnish cup once. In season 2011–12 the team also participated in EuroChallenge. Some Finnish internationals, for example Antti Nikkilä, former NBA player Eric Washington and World and European champion Heino Enden have all played in Pyrintö.

Club's women's team has won eight Finnish championships and national cup once. It played FIBA Women's European Champions Cup in the season 1986–87.

=== Orienteering ===
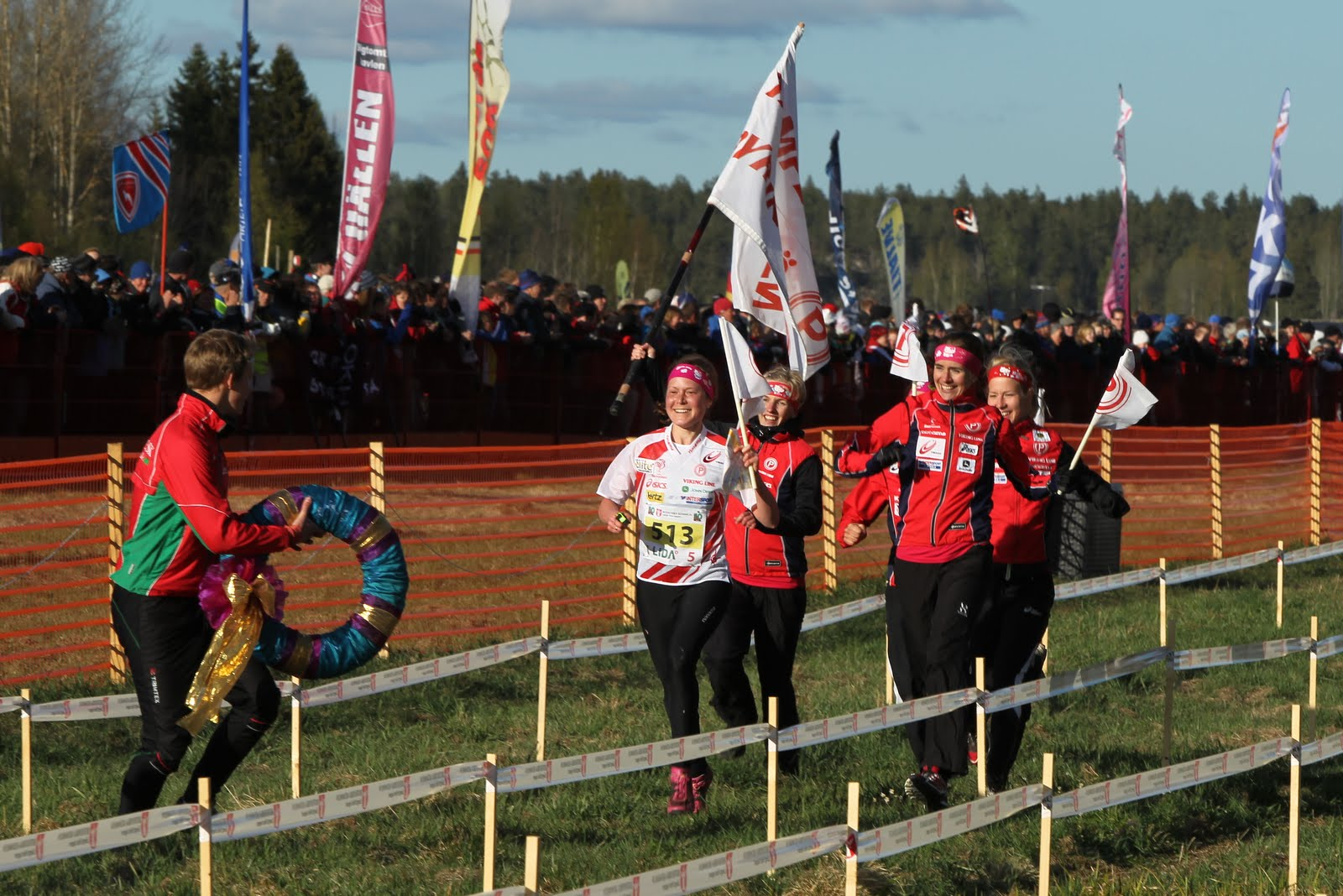
Pyrintö's women's team winning Tiomila in 2011.

Pyrintö's orienteering section has gained much success during its long existence. World champions Jarkko Huovila and Outi Borgenström have represented Pyrintö, as well as current women's national team members Anni-Maija Fincke and Venla Niemi. Pyrintö has won Jukola relay, Venla relay and Tiomila several times.

== Notable Pyrintö representatives ==
- Jaakko Friman, speed skater, Olympic medalist
- Jaakko Kailajärvi, weightlifter
- Jouni Kailajärvi, weightlifter
- Pentti Lammio, speed skater, Olympic medalist
- Pekka Niemi, weightlifter, Olympic medalist
- Oberon Pitterson, Jamaica basketball and netball international
- Hilkka Riihivuori, cross-country skier, Olympic medalist

== Former sports ==
=== Pesäpallo ===
In the native sport of Finland, pesäpallo, Pyrintö won four times women's Finnish championship (1933, 1935, 1936 and 1937). Club's men's team achieved silver in 1925 and bronze in 1926 and 1949.
