= Turun Urheiluliitto =

Finnish sports club

Turun Urheiluliitto (TuUL) is a sports club from Turku, Finland that was founded in 1901. The club includes sports teams for cross-country skiing, bowling, volleyball, ice skating, boxing, cycling, triathlon, gymnastics, and track and field.

The club's most successful athlete is still Paavo Nurmi. The club has also been represented by the following Olympic medalists: Hannes Kolehmainen, Harri Larva, Raimo Heinonen, Veikko Karvonen, and Kaisa Parviainen.

== Season to season ==
Season	Level	Division	Section	Administration	Position	Movements
1933	Tier 2	B-Sarja (Second Division)		Finnish FA (Suomen Pallolitto)	1st	Promoted
1934	Tier 1	A-Sarja (Premier League)		Finnish FA (Suomen Pallolitto)	8th	Relegated
1935	Tier 2	B-Sarja (Second Division)	West	Finnish FA (Suomen Pallolitto)	3rd	
1936	Tier 2	B-Sarja (Second Division)	West	Finnish FA (Suomen Pallolitto)	2nd	Promotion Group 2nd - Promoted
1937	Tier 1	Mestaruussarja (Premier League)		Finnish FA (Suomen Pallolitto)	8th	Relegated
1938	Tier 2	Itä-Länsi-sarja (Second Division)	West League, South Group	Finnish FA (Suomen Pallolitto)	4th	
1939	Tier 2	Itä-Länsi-sarja (Second Division)	West League, Group II	Finnish FA (Suomen Pallolitto)	4th	
1940-41	Tier 3	C-sarja (Third Division)	Group II	Finnish FA (Suomen Pallolitto)	3rd	

- 2 season in Mestaruussarja
- 5 seasons in B-Sarja
- 1 seasons in C-Sarja
