= Annimari Korte =

Finnish hurdler and journalist

Personal information
- Full name: Annimari Katriina Korte
- Nationality: Finnish
- Born: 8 April 1988 (age 38) Kirkkonummi, Finland
- Height: 1.64 m (5 ft 5 in)
- Weight: 52 kg (115 lb)
- Website: annimari.fi

Sport
- Country: Finland
- Sport: Athletics
- Event: 100m hurdles
- Club: HIFK

Achievements and titles
- Personal best: 100m hurdles: 12.72 s (Joensuu 2019)
- Updated on June 21, 2019

Annimari Katriina Korte OLY (born 8 April 1988 in Kirkkonummi, Finland) is a Finnish 100 meter hurdler and a sports journalist. Her personal best and the former national record (24 July 2019 in Joensuu) of 12.72 makes her the second fastest Finnish woman of all time in 100 meter hurdles.

Korte had to retire from athletics in 2012 due to illnesses. She was diagnosed with an eosinophilic esophagitis and Tietze syndrome. She started athletics again in 2017. Korte represented Finland at the 2019 World Championships Women's 100 metres hurdles and qualified for the semi-finals. She represented Finland at the 2020 Summer Olympics.

Korte has a Master's degree in Sports Journalism from St Mary's University in London and a Bachelor's degree in Communication Studies from Clemson University. She has also studied in University of Georgia and San Diego State University.

== Personal life ==
Korte studied in the United States from 2007 to 2011. While there, she was in a relationship with American football player DeAndre Hopkins. She was also in a relationship with Jamaican hurdler Hansle Parchment, whom she met in London after the 2012 Summer Olympics, when she was studying at a university there. In 2014, while working as a journalist, she met French hurdler Pascal Martinot-Lagarde, with whom she was in a relationship. Korte was also in a relationship with Cuban hurdler Orlando Ortega, whom she met in 2015.

Korte was diagnosed with ADHD in 2023.
