= MS Parma =

Finnish orienteering club

MS Parma is a Finnish orienteering club from the outskirts of Turku (Lieto and Mynämäki). It was formed in 2004 when the orienteers from Liedon Parma and Mynämäen Suunnistajat-54 started to compete for the joint club.

In 2018 its team became third in the Venla relay with Anastasia Rudnaya, Tiia Isolahti, Tuulia Viberg and Maija Sianoja. MS Parma won the Halikko relay in Salo in 2019 with Arto Talvinen in the last leg. In 2019 its team was leading after four legs in Tiomila. The club won the youth relay in Tiomila in 2014.

== Oravatonni ==
Oravatonni is a youth competition that Mynämäen Suunnistajat-54 has organised in autumn since 1986. It gathers around 1300 runners.
