= Johanna Peiponen =

Finnish long-distance runner

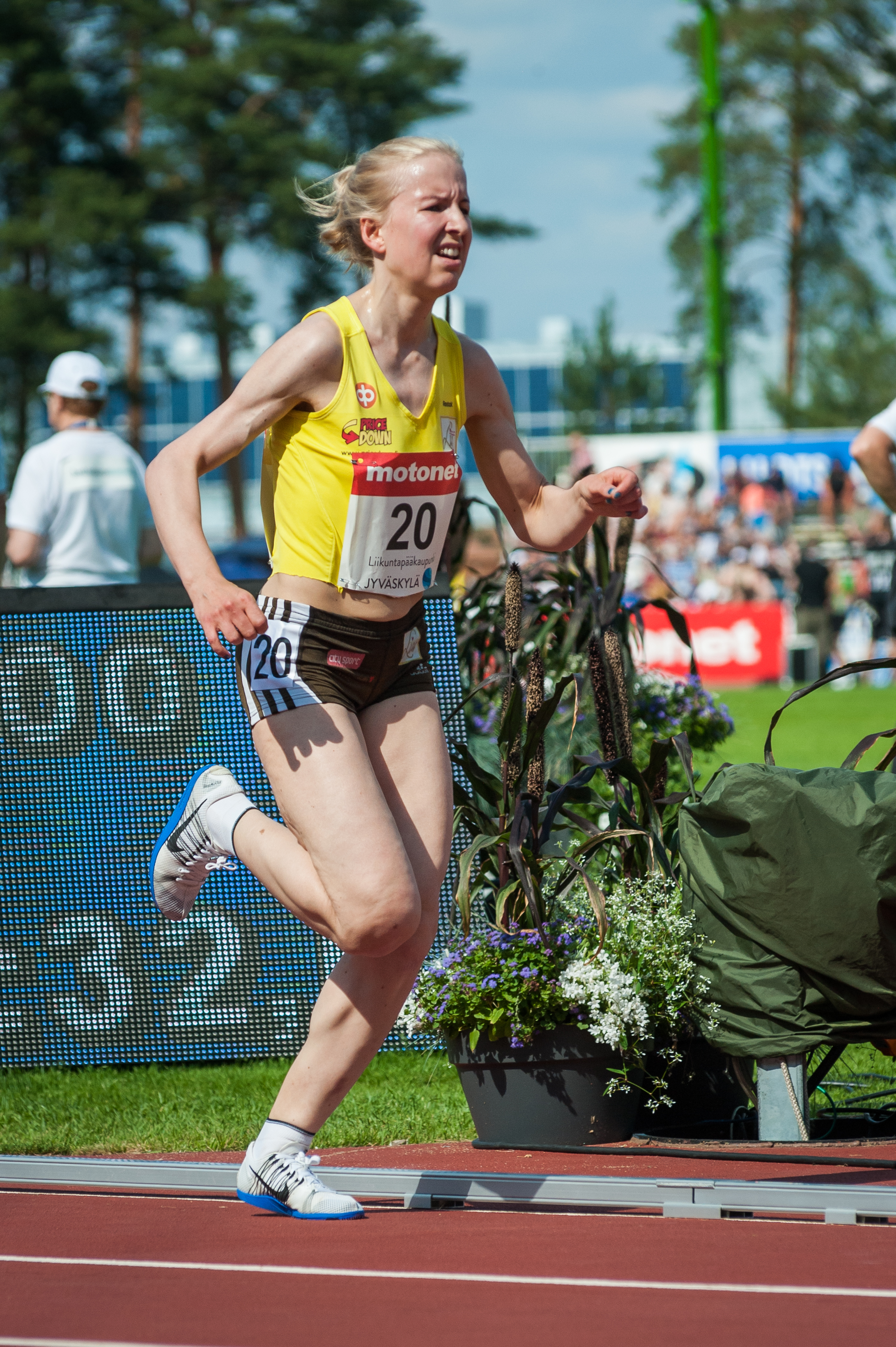
- Peiponen in 2018

Personal information
- Born: 18 December 1990 (age 35)

Sport
- Country: Finland
- Sport: Track and field
- Event: 10,000 metres

Johanna Peiponen (born 18 December 1990) is a Finnish long-distance runner. She competed in the 10,000 metres at the 2016 European Athletics Championships.
