= Joonas Rinne =

Finnish runner

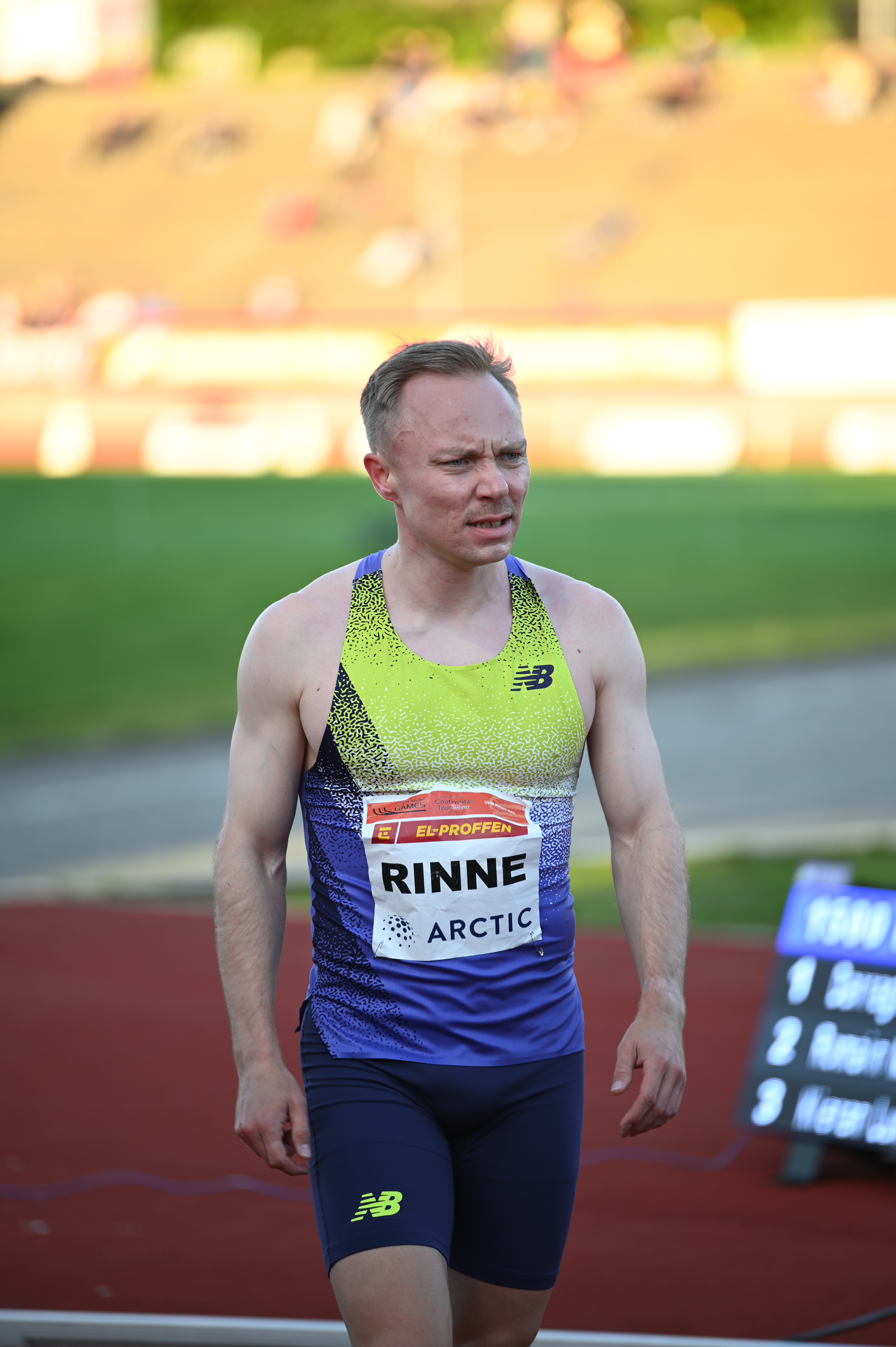
- Joonas Rinne in 2026

Personal information
- Born: 20 May 1995 (age 31) Karstula, Finland
- Height: 1.73 m (5 ft 8 in)
- Weight: 63 kg (139 lb)

Sport
- Sport: Athletics
- Event(s): 800 metres, 1500 metres
- Club: Saarijärven Pullistus
- Coached by: Minna Rinne
Medal record
Athletics
Representing Finland
Summer Universiade
Bronze medal – third place	2019 Naples	1500 m

Joonas Rinne (born 20 May 1995) is a Finnish middle-distance runner who specializes in the 800 metres and 1500 metres. He is a four-time national champion in the 800 metres and a seven-time national champion in the 1500 metres. In 2019, he won a bronze medal in the 1500 m at the Summer Universiade. He also competed in the 800 metres at the 2023 World Athletics Championships, but was eliminated in the heats.

He studied at the University of Jyväskylä.

== Personal bests ==
Outdoor

- 800 metres – 1:45.88 (Turku 2023)
- 1500 metres – 3:37.65 (Joensuu 2023)

Indoor

- 800 metres – 1:47.96 (Istanbul 2023)
- 1500 metres – 3:41.10 (Belgrade 2023)
