= Elisa Neuvonen =

Finnish race walker (born 1991)

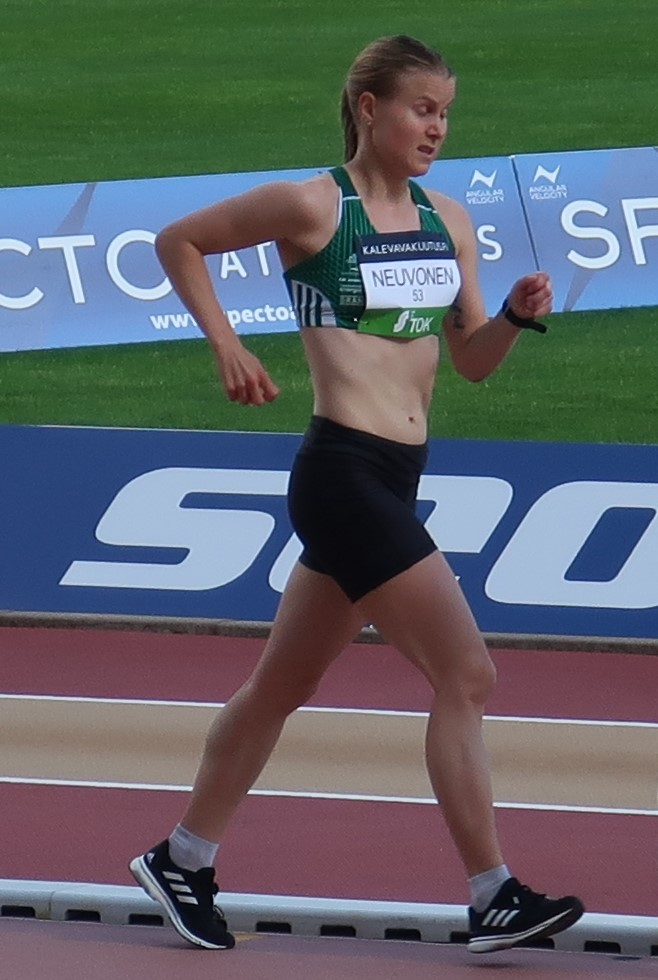
- Neuvonen in 2020

Personal information
- Born: 19 March 1991 (age 35) Saari, Finland

Sport
- Sport: Track and field
- Event: Race walking
Medal record
Representing Finland
Summer Universiade
Bronze medal – third place	2017 Taipei	20km walk

Elisa Pauliina Neuvonen (born 19 March 1991) is a Finnish race walker. She is a seven-time national champion and has won a bronze medal at the 2017 Summer Universiade.

She competed at the 2022 World Athletics Championships where she finished in 20th place and broke the Finnish national record in the 35 km walk.
