= Saint Lucia at the World Athletics Championships =

- Flag of Saint Lucia
- WA code: LCA
- Medals: Gold 0 Silver 0 Bronze 1 Total 1

World Athletics Championships appearances (overview)
- 1983; 1987; 1991; 1993; 1995; 1997; 1999; 2001; 2003; 2005; 2007; 2009; 2011; 2013; 2015; 2017; 2019; 2022; 2023; 2025

Saint Lucia has competed in every edition of World Athletics Championships, winning its first medal only in 2025 by Paris 2024 Olympic champion Julian Alfred in women's 100 meters. She has also won the first global athletics medal for her country, and became the first saint lucian athlete to medal at the Olympic Games, when she won the 100 meters final.

== Medalists ==
Medal	Name	Year	Event
Bronze	Julian Alfred	2025 Tokyo	Women's 100 meters

=== By event ===
Event	Gold	Silver	Bronze	Total
100 meters	0	0	1	1
Totals (1 entries)	0	0	1	1

=== By gender ===
Gender	Gold	Silver	Bronze	Total
Women	0	0	1	1
Men	0	0	0	0

== See also ==
- Saint Lucia at the Olympics
- Saint Lucia at the Paralympics
