= List of OECS records in athletics =

The following is a list of the best records in the sport of athletics – including track and field, road running and racewalking – set by athletes representing one of the member states of the Organisation of Eastern Caribbean States.

- Anguilla
- Antigua and Barbuda
- British Virgin Islands
- Dominica
- Grenada
- Montserrat
- Saint Kitts and Nevis
- Saint Lucia
- Saint Vincent and the Grenadines

== Outdoor ==
Key to tables: Awaiting ratification by national federation

y = denotes 880 yards
# = not ratified by national federation or/and World Athletics
A = affected by altitude

=== Men ===
Event	Record	Athlete	Nationality	Date	Meet	Place	Ref.	Video
60 m	6.59 (−0.7 m/s)	Kim Collins	Saint Kitts and Nevis	3 August 2013	Grand Prix of Cheb	Cheb, Czech Republic		
100 y	9.29+ (+1.1 m/s)	Kim Collins	Saint Kitts and Nevis	31 May 2011	Golden Spike Ostrava	Ostrava, Czech Republic		
100 m	9.91 (−0.2 m/s)	Daniel Bailey	Antigua and Barbuda	17 June 2009	Meeting Areva	Paris, France		
150 m (straight)	14.88 (+1.4 m/s)	Daniel Bailey	Antigua and Barbuda	31 March 2013	Mano a Mano Challenge	Rio de Janeiro, Brazil		
150 m (bend)	15.35	Kim Collins	Saint Kitts and Nevis	3 August 2013	Grand Prix of Cheb	Cheb, Czech Republic		
200 m	19.88 (+1.2 m/s)	Miguel Francis	Antigua and Barbuda	11 June 2016	Jamaica National Racer's Grand Prix	Kingston, Jamaica		
200 m	19.76 (−1.1 m/s) #	Miguel Francis	Antigua and Barbuda	28 June 2015		St. John's, Antigua and Barbuda		
200 m	19.67 (+0.4 m/s) #	Miguel Francis	Antigua and Barbuda	10 July 2016	Antigua and Barbuda National Championships	St. John's, Antigua and Barbuda		
200 m (straight)	20.59 (−0.4 m/s)	Kim Collins	Saint Kitts and Nevis	16 May 2010	Manchester City Games	Manchester, United Kingdom		
400 m	43.74	Kirani James	Grenada	3 July 2014	Athletissima	Lausanne, Switzerland		
800 m	1:42.87	Handal Roban	Saint Vincent and the Grenadines	16 August 2025	NACAC Championships	Freeport, Bahamas		
1500 m	3:36.60	Steve Agar	Dominica	2 June 1996		Abbotsford, Canada		
3000 m	7:56.34	Steve Agar	Dominica	16 May 1998		Stanford, United States		
5000 m	13:35.86	Steve Agar	Dominica	18 April 1998	Mt. SAC Relays	Walnut, United States		
5 km (road)	16:03+	Eduardo Garcia	US Virgin Islands	9 April 2017	Rotterdam Marathon	Rotterdam, Netherlands		
10,000 m	29:48.97	Zepherinus Joseph	Saint Lucia	23 March 2001		Tallahassee, United States		
10 km (road)	32:01+	Eduardo Garcia	US Virgin Islands	9 April 2017	Rotterdam Marathon	Rotterdam, Netherlands		
15 km (road)	46:05	Eduardo Garcia	US Virgin Islands	11 March 2017	Gat River Run	Jacksonville, United States		
20 km (road)	1:03:57+	Eduardo Garcia	US Virgin Islands	9 April 2017	Rotterdam Marathon	Rotterdam, Netherlands		
Half marathon	1:06:17	Eduardo Garcia	US Virgin Islands	15 January 2017	Naples Half Marathon	Naples, United States		
25 km (road)	1:20:09+	Eduardo Garcia	US Virgin Islands	9 April 2017	Rotterdam Marathon	Rotterdam, Netherlands		
30 km (road)	1:36:49+	Eduardo Garcia	US Virgin Islands	9 April 2017	Rotterdam Marathon	Rotterdam, Netherlands		
Marathon	2:15:30	Pamenos Ballantyne	Saint Vincent and the Grenadines	26 January 2003		Port of Spain, Trinidad and Tobago		
110 m hurdles	13.52 (+1.2 m/s)	Alleyne Lett	Grenada	6 June 2007	NCAA Division I Championships	Sacramento, United States		
300 m hurdles	34.95	Kyron McMaster	British Virgin Islands	26 April 2025	Xiamen Diamond League	Xiamen, China		
400 m hurdles	47.02	Rai Benjamin	Antigua and Barbuda	8 June 2018	NCAA Division I Championships	Eugene, United States		
3000 m steeplechase	9:29.10	Neehall Philogene	Dominica	1 May 1999		St. Charles, United States		
High jump	2.31 m	Darvin Edwards	Saint Lucia	30 August 2011	World Championships	Daegu, South Korea		
Pole vault	5.70 m	Dominic Johnson	Saint Lucia	26 August 2000		El Paso, United States		
Long jump	8.09 m	Eugene Licorish	Grenada	5 May 1989		Port of Spain, Trinidad and Tobago		
Triple jump	17.49 m (±0.0 m/s)	Randy Lewis	Grenada	22 May 2008		São Paulo, Brazil		
Shot put	20.63 m	Eldread Henry	British Virgin Islands	10 August 2018	NACAC Championships	Toronto, Canada		
Weight throw	18.32 m	Eldread Henry	British Virgin Islands	14 March 2015	CAC Throwers Pentathlon	Coolidge, United States		
Discus throw	61.90 m	Eldread Henry	British Virgin Islands	26 April 2014	UCSD Triton Invitational	La Jolla, United States		
Hammer throw	70.41 m	Adonson Shallow	Saint Vincent and the Grenadines	19 April 2013	Southeastern Louisiana Lion Invitational	Hammond, United States		
Javelin throw	93.07 m	Anderson Peters	Grenada	13 May 2022	Doha Diamond League	Doha, Qatar		
Decathlon	8756 pts	Lindon Victor	Grenada	25–26 August 2023	World Championships	Budapest, Hungary		
Decathlon	100m (wind) / Long jump (wind) / Shot put / High jump / 400m / 110m H (wind) / Discus / Pole vault / Javelin / 1500m; 10.60 (+0.1 m/s) / 7.55 m (+1.0 m/s) / 15.94 m / 2.02 m / 48.05 / 14.47 (+0.2 m/s) / 54.97 m / 4.80 m / 68.05 m / 4:39.67							
20 km walk (road)	2:03:30	Albert Turlet	Dominica	9 November 2019	Meeting d'Autome de Nogent	Nogent-sur-Marne, France		
35 km walk (road)	4:03:52	Albert Turlet	Dominica	3 October 2021	NK 50 km	Tilburg, Netherlands		
50 km walk (road)	5:45:19	Albert Turlet	Dominica	24 November 2019	Les 8 Heures d'Etampes-sur-Marne	Etampes-sur-Marne, France		
4 × 100 m relay	38.01	Chavaughn Walsh; Daniel Bailey; Jared Jarvis; Miguel Francis	Antigua and Barbuda	29 August 2015	World Championships	Beijing, China		
4 × 200 m relay	1:20.51	Antoine Adams; Lestrod Roland; Brijesh Lawrence; Allistar Clarke	Saint Kitts and Nevis	24 May 2014	IAAF World Relays	Nassau, Bahamas		
4 × 400 m relay	3:04.69	Joel Redhead; Kirani James; Kemon Herry; Rondell Bartholomew	Grenada	30 April 2011	Penn Relays	Philadelphia, United States		

=== Women ===
Event	Record	Athlete	Nationality	Date	Meet	Place	Ref.
100 m	10.63 (+1.9 m/s)	Adaejah Hodge	British Virgin Islands	11 June 2026	NCAA Division I Championships	Eugene, United States	
150 m (bend)	16.25+ (−0.6 m/s)	Julien Alfred	Saint Lucia	19 July 2025	London Athletics Meet	London, United Kingdom	
200 m	21.68 (−0.4 m/s)	Adaejah Hodge	British Virgin Islands	13 June 2026	NCAA Division I Championships	Eugene, United States	
300 m	36.05	Julien Alfred	Saint Lucia	5 April 2025	Miramar Invitational	Miramar, United States	
400 m	50.63	Shafiqua Maloney	Saint Vincent and the Grenadines	14 July 2024	Meeting Internazionale Sport e Solidarieta	Lignano Sabbiadoro, Italy	
600 m	1:22.98	Shafiqua Maloney	Saint Vincent and the Grenadines	1 September 2024	ISTAF Berlin	Berlin, Germany	
800 m	1:57.29	Shafiqua Maloney	Saint Vincent and the Grenadines	28 August 2025	Weltklasse Zürich	Zurich, Switzerland	
1500 m	4:20.78	Bigna Samuel	Saint Vincent and the Grenadines	17 April 1994	Mt. SAC Relays	Walnut, United States	
3000 m	9:31.37	Bigna Samuel	Saint Vincent and the Grenadines	16 April 1994	Mt. SAC Relays	Walnut, United States	
5000 m	16:56.42	Janill Williams	Antigua and Barbuda	11 August 2000		Victoria, Canada	
5 km (road)	21:14.00	Laura Lynn Limery	Saint Lucia	19 October 2025	Kwéyòl 5K Run	Gros Islet, Saint Lucia	
10,000 m							
10 km (road)	44:54.1	Laura Lynn Limery	Saint Lucia	3 July 2023	CARICOM 10K	Port of Spain, Trinidad and Tobago	
15 km (road)	1:12:48+	Ava Fevrier	Saint Lucia	16 March 2025	New York City Half Marathon	New York City, United States	
20 km (road)	1:37:00+	Ava Fevrier	Saint Lucia	16 March 2025	New York City Half Marathon	New York City, United States	
Half marathon	1:38:23	Katrina Crumpler	British Virgin Islands	9 November 2014		San Juan, Puerto Rico	
25 km (road)	2:08:14+	Ava Fevrier	Saint Lucia	13 October 2024	Chicago Marathon	Chicago, United States	
30 km (road)	2:37:33+	Ava Fevrier	Saint Lucia	27 April 2025	London Marathon	London, United Kingdom	
Marathon	3:18:44	Adelaide Carrington	Saint Vincent and the Grenadines	26 January 2003		Port of Spain, Trinidad & Tobago	
100 m hurdles	13.13 (+1.0 m/s)	Deya Erickson	British Virgin Islands	11 April 2026	South Florida Invitational	Tampa, United States	
300 m hurdles	46.43	Deya Erickson	British Virgin Islands	1 April 2023	Felix Sánchez Classic	Santo Domingo, Dominican Republic	
400 m hurdles	56.31	Reanda Richards	Saint Kitts and Nevis	24 May 2019	NCAA East Preliminary Round	Jacksonville, United States	
3000 m steeplechase							
High jump	1.98 m	Levern Spencer	Saint Lucia	8 May 2010	Georgia Invitational	Athens, United States	
Pole vault	3.00 m	Naya Jules	Saint Lucia	19 April 2025	CARIFTA Games	Port of Spain, Trinidad and Tobago	
Long jump	7.08 m (+1.4 m/s)	Chantel Malone	British Virgin Islands	27 March 2021	Florida International Pro Addition Meeting	Miramar, United States	
Triple jump	15.25 m (+1.8 m/s)	Thea LaFond	Dominica	26 June 2026	Boris Hanžeković Memorial	Zagreb, Croatia	
Shot put	16.48 m	Vannessa Henry	Dominica	14 April 2012	Patriot Open Invitational	Fairfax, United States	
Discus throw	51.43 m	Tynelle Gumbs	British Virgin Islands	22 April 2017	Polar Bear Invitational	El Paso, United States	
Hammer throw	60.97 m	Tynelle Gumbs	British Virgin Islands	10 April 2018	Commonwealth Games	Gold Coast, Australia	
Javelin throw	57.22 m	Erma-Gene Evans	Saint Lucia	29 March 2008	UTEP Springtime Invitational	El Paso, United States	
Heptathlon	6050 pts	Makeba Alcide	Saint Lucia	6–7 June 2013	NCAA Division I Championships	Eugene, United States	
Heptathlon	100m H (wind) / High jump / Shot put / 200m (wind) / Long jump (wind) / Javelin / 800m; 13.52 (+1.0 m/s) / 1.81 m / 12.35 m / 24.18w (+2.3 m/s) / 6.05 m w (+2.7 m/s) / 34.65 m / 2:12.05						
4 × 100 m relay	43.45	Ashley Kelly; Tahesia Harrigan-Scott; Chantel Malone; Karene King	British Virgin Islands	2 July 2016	OECS Championships	Road Town, British Virgin Islands	
4 × 200 m relay	1:34.92	Nelda Huggins; Tahesia Harrigan-Scott; Karene King; Ashley Kelly	British Virgin Islands	22 April 2017	IAAF World Relays	Nassau, Bahamas	
Sprint medley relay (1,1,2,4)	1:40.04	Tahesia Harrigan-Scott (100 m); Karene King (100 m); Beyoncé Defreitas (200 m); Ashley Kelly (400 m)	British Virgin Islands	29 April 2017	Penn Relays	Philadelphia, Pennsylvania	
4 × 400 m relay	3:32.99	Kishara George; Neisha Bernard-Thomas; Jackie-Ann Morain; Hazel-Ann Regis	Grenada	6 July 2003	Central American and Caribbean Championships	St. George's, Grenada	

== Indoor ==
=== Men ===
Event	Record	Athlete	Nationality	Date	Meet	Place	Ref.	Video
50 m	5.74+	Rikkoi Braithwaite	British Virgin Islands	4 February 2025	Czech Indoor Gala	Ostrava, Czech Republic		
55 m	6.13 A	Ronald Promesse	Saint Lucia	22 February 1997	WAC Championships	Colorado Springs, United States		
60 m	6.47	Kim Collins	Saint Kitts and Nevis	17 February 2015	Pedro's Cup	Łódź, Poland		
200 m	20.34	Rai Benjamin	Antigua and Barbuda	10 March 2018	NCAA Division I Championships	College Station, United States		
300 m	31.97	Bralon Taplin	Grenada	14 February 2017	Czech Indoor Gala	Ostrava, Czech Republic		
400 m	44.80	Kirani James	Grenada	27 February 2011	SEC Championships	Fayetteville, United States		
500 m	1:03.87	Michael James	Saint Lucia	16 January 2016	Great Dane Classic	Staten Island, United States		
600 m	1:14.89	Handal Roban	Saint Vincent and the Grenadines	7 February 2026	Sykes Sabock Challenge	State College, United States		
800 m	1:44.73	Handal Roban	Saint Vincent and the Grenadines	14 February 2026	Sound Invite	Winston-Salem, United States		
1000 m	2:24.08	Handal Roban	Saint Vincent and the Grenadines	14 January 2023	Nittany Lion Challenge	State College, United States		
1500 m	3:42.34	Stephen Agar	Dominica	3 March 1997		Sindelfingen, Germany		
Mile	4:11.45	Zepherinus Joseph	Saint Lucia	4 February 2001	Gator Invitational	Florida, United States		
3000 m	7:56.44	Stephen Agar	Dominica	12 March 1993	World Championships	Toronto, Canada		
5000 m	14:45.93	Delohnni Nicol-Samuel	Saint Vincent and the Grenadines	30 January 2015		Winston-Salem, United States		
60 m hurdles	7.70 (heat)	Alleyne Lett	Grenada	9 March 2007	NCAA Division I Championships	Fayetteville, United States		
60 m hurdles	7.70 (final)	Alleyne Lett	Grenada	9 March 2007	NCAA Division I Championships	Fayetteville, United States		
High jump	2.24 m	James Grayman	Antigua and Barbuda	21 February 2010	Belgian Championships	Ghent, Belgium		
Pole vault	4.76 m (Note: record set during heptathlon competition)	Lindon Victor	Grenada	11 March 2017	NCAA Division I Championships	College Station, United States		
Long jump	7.92 m	Lester Benjamin	Antigua and Barbuda	21 January 1988		Johnson City, United States		
Long jump	8.04 m	Uroy Ryan	Saint Vincent and the Grenadines	13 March 2026	NCAA Division I Championships	Fayetteville, United States		
Triple jump	17.27 m	Randy Lewis	Grenada	10 February 2008	BW-Bank Meeting	Karlsruhe, Germany		
Shot put	20.00 m # (Note: probably outdoor performance)	Eldread Henry	British Virgin Islands	21 February 2015	GCC Indoor Invite	Glendale, United States		
Shot put	19.44 m	Eldread Henry	British Virgin Islands	12 January 2019	Findlay Open	Findlay, United States		
Weight throw	19.61 m	Dillon Myron Simon	Dominica	25 January 2014	Wesley A. Brown Invitational	Annapolis, United States		
Heptathlon	5986 pts	Kurt Felix	Grenada	18–19 March 2016	World Championships	Portland, United States		
Heptathlon	60m / Long jump / Shot put / High jump / 60m H / Pole vault / 1000m; 7.00 / 7.45 m / 15.02 m / 2.11 m / 8.34 / 4.50 m / 2:44.23							
Heptathlon	6029 pts	Lindon Victor	Grenada	18–19 March 2022	World Championships	Belgrade, Serbia		
Heptathlon	60m / Long jump / Shot put / High jump / 60m H / Pole vault / 1000m; 6.91 / 7.56 m / 15.65 m / 2.05 m / 8.41 / 4.70 m / 2:48.21							
5000 m walk								
4 × 400 m relay	3:30.01	Rakeel Jack; Joshua Hill; Rikkoi Brathwaite; Valique Graham	British Virgin Islands	2016				

=== Women ===
Event	Record	Athlete	Nationality	Date	Meet	Place	Ref.
50 m	6.24+	Adaejah Hodge	British Virgin Islands	12 January 2024	VA Showcase	Virginia Beach, United States	
55 m	6.75	Tahesia Harrigan	British Virgin Islands	24 February 2006	SEC Championships	Gainesville, United States	
55 m	6.75	Tahesia Harrigan	British Virgin Islands	23 January 2015	Carnes Invitational	Gainesville, United States	
60 m	6.94 A	Julien Alfred	Saint Lucia	11 March 2023	NCAA Division I Championships	Albuquerque, United States	
200 m	22.01 A	Julien Alfred	Saint Lucia	11 March 2023	NCAA Division I Championships	Albuquerque, United States	
300 m	36.16	Julien Alfred	Saint Lucia	2 February 2025	New Balance Indoor Grand Prix	Boston, United States	
400 m	50.92	Hazel-Ann Regis	Grenada	12 March 2005	NCAA Division I Championships	Fayetteville, United States	
500 m	1:11.60	Tarika Moses	British Virgin Islands	29 January 2016	John Thomas Terrier Invitational	Boston, United States	
600 m	1:31.10 A	Tarika Moses	British Virgin Islands	13 February 2016	Don Kirby Open & Elite	Albuquerque, United States	
800 m	1:57.29	Shafiqua Maloney	Saint Vincent and the Grenadines	28 August 2025	Weltklasse Zürich	Zurich, Switzerland	
1000 m	2:41.22	Shafiqua Maloney	Saint Vincent and the Grenadines	12 January 2024	Arkansas Invitational	Fayetteville, United States	
1500 m	4:47.62 y	Neisha Bernard-Thomas	Grenada	5 March 2010		Baton Rouge, United States	
Mile	4:47.62	Neisha Bernard-Thomas	Grenada	5 March 2010		Baton Rouge, United States	
3000 m							
55 m hurdles	8.25	Reanda Richards	Saint Kitts and Nevis	28 January 2018	Ocean Breeze Invitational	Staten Island, United States	
60 m hurdles	8.31 A	Makeba Alcide	Saint Lucia	19 February 2016	NAU Tune Up	Flagstaff, United States	
High jump	1.95 m	Levern Spencer	Saint Lucia	7 March 2014	World Championships	Sopot, Poland	
High jump	1.95 m	Levern Spencer	Saint Lucia	13 February 2016		Hustopeče, Czech Republic	
High jump	1.95 m	Levern Spencer	Saint Lucia	30 April 2016	Drake Relays	Des Moines, United States	
High jump	1.95 m	Levern Spencer	Saint Lucia	30 January 2018	Beskydská laťka	Třinec, Czech Republic	
Pole vault
Pole vault	3.05 m	Naya Jules	Saint Lucia	10 January 2026	Friends University First-Chance Qualifier	Wichita, United States	
Long jump	6.67 m	Chantel Malone	British Virgin Islands	10 February 2017	ISTAF Indoor	Berlin, Germany	
Triple jump	14.62 m A	Thea LaFond	Dominica	22 January 2022	Dr. Martin Luther King Collegiate Invitational	Albuquerque, United States	
Triple jump	15.01 m	Thea LaFond	Dominica	3 March 2024	World Championships	Glasgow, United Kingdom	
Shot put	16.50 m	Vannessa Henry	Dominica	20 January 2012	Great Dane Classic	New York City, United States	
Weight throw	21.32 m	Tynelle Gumbs	British Virgin Islands	10 February 2017		Boston, United States	
Pentathlon	4569 pts	Makeba Alcide	Saint Lucia	22 February 2013	SEC Championships	Fayetteville, United States	
Pentathlon	60m H / High jump / Shot put / Long jump / 800m; 8.35 / 1.87 m / 12.32 m / 6.15 m / 2:16.37						
3000 m walk							
4 × 400 m relay	3:45.34	Tarika Moses; Lakeisha Warner; Karene King; Beyoncé Defeitas	British Virgin Islands	2016			
