= Saint Lucia at the 2014 Commonwealth Games =

- CG code: LCA
- CGA: Saint Lucia Olympic Committee
- Website: slunoc.org

in Glasgow, Scotland
- Competitors: 32 in 6 sports
- Flag bearer: Levern Spencer
- Medals Ranked =35th: Gold 0 Silver 0 Bronze 1 Total 1

Commonwealth Games appearances (overview)
- 1962; 1966; 1970; 1974; 1978; 1982–1990; 1994; 1998; 2002; 2006; 2010; 2014; 2018; 2022; 2026; 2030

Saint Lucia competed in the 2014 Commonwealth Games in Glasgow, Scotland from 23 July to 3 August 2014.

== Athletics ==
St. Lucia has entered eight athletes.

Men

Athlete	Event	Round 1		Semifinal		Final	
Athlete	Event	Result	Rank	Result	Rank	Result	Rank
Corneil Lionel	100 m	10.72	4	did not advance			
Corneil Lionel	200 m	21.30	4	did not advance			
Rosen Daniel	200 m	22.06	6	did not advance			
Rosen Daniel	400 m	47.97	6	did not advance			
Talberc Poleon	400 m	47.32	5	did not advance			

Field events

Athlete	Event	Qualification		Final	
Athlete	Event	Distance	Position	Distance	Position
Albert Reynolds	Javelin throw	69.10 SB	16	did not advance	
Rick Valcin	Pole vault	—N/a		5.00	10

Women
Field events

Athlete	Event	Qualification		Final	
Athlete	Event	Distance	Position	Distance	Position
Jeanelle Scheper	High jump	1.85 Q	=1	1.89	=4
Levern Spencer	High jump	1.85 Q	=1	1.92	3rd place, bronze medalist(s)

Combined events – Heptathlon

Athlete	Event	100H	HJ	SP	200 m	LJ	JT	800 m	Final	Rank
Makeba Alcide	Result	13.87	1.75	12.19	25.05	5.36	DNS	DNS	DNF	
Makeba Alcide	Points	997	916	674	882	660	0	0	DNF	

Key

- Note–Ranks given for track events are within the athlete's heat only
- Q = Qualified for the next round
- q = Qualified for the next round as a fastest loser or, in field events, by position without achieving the qualifying target
- NR = National record
- N/A = Round not applicable for the event
- Bye = Athlete not required to compete in round

== Boxing ==
Saint Lucia has entered four boxers.

Men

Athlete	Event	Round of 64	Round of 32	Round of 16	Quarterfinals	Semifinals	Final	
Athlete	Event	Opposition Result	Opposition Result	Opposition Result	Opposition Result	Opposition Result	Opposition Result	Rank
Lyndel Marcellin	Light welterweight	—N/a	Colin (MRI); L 0–3	did not advance				
Ron Bastien	Welterweight	—N/a	Fitzgerald (ENG); L KO3	did not advance				
Arthur Langelier	Middleweight	—N/a	Oliver (MRI); L 0–3	did not advance				
Ryan Charles	Light heavyweight	—N/a	Samardali (AUS); L 0–2	did not advance				

== Netball ==
Saint Lucia has qualified a netball team for the first time ever.

Roster

- Germaine Altifois-Fenelon
- Denise Charles
- Ianna Hippolyte
- Rommela Hunte
- Chattnanay Justin
- Indira Laurencin
- Judie Mathurin
- Shem Maxwell
- Zalika Paul
- Delia Samuel
- Roxanne Snyder
- Saphia William

Pool A

Team	Pld	W	L	PF	PA	PD	Pts	Qualification
New Zealand	5	5	0	337	151	+186	10	Semi-finals
Jamaica	5	4	1	344	184	+160	8	Semi-finals
Malawi	5	3	2	299	244	+55	6	
Northern Ireland	5	2	3	211	286	−75	4	
Scotland	5	1	4	165	268	−103	2	
Saint Lucia	5	0	5	141	364	−223	0	

Source: glasgow2014.com

24 July 2014
19:00

Report
Saint Lucia
24 – 88
Jamaica

SECC Precinct
Umpires:
Yvonne Morgan (NZL)
Sharon Kelly (AUS)
Reserve umpire:
Joshua Bowring (AUS)
Hippolyte 4/4 (100%)
Laurencin 9/13 (69%)
Maxwell 11/16 (69%)

Aiken 23/28 (82%)
Beckford 16/18 (89%)
Harwood 17/18 (94%)
Reid 32/35 (91%)

25 July 2014
17:00

Report
Scotland
58 – 30
Saint Lucia

SECC Precinct
Umpires:
Theresa Prince (RSA)
Ian Fuller (ENG)
Reserve umpire:
Terrence Peart (JAM)
Gallagher 21/25 (84%)
MacDonald 22/27 (81%)
Pettitt 10/12 (83%)
Sole 5/6 (83%)

Hippolyte 0/4 (0%)
Laurencin 20/25 (80%)
Maxwell 10/16 (63%)

26 July 2014
17:00

Report
Saint Lucia
28 – 69
Malawi

SECC Precinct
Umpires:
Michelle Phippard (AUS)
Marie-Louw Van Der Merve (RSA)
Reserve umpire:
Yvonne Morgan (NZL)
Altifois-Fenelon 2/3 (67%)
Hippolyte 9/13 (69%)
Laurencin 1/5 (20%)
Maxwell 16/28 (57%)

Kumwenda 42/49 (86%)
Mvula 12/14 (86%)
Simtowe 15/19 (79%)

28 July 2014
17:00

Report
Northern Ireland
61 – 40
Saint Lucia

SECC Precinct
Umpires:
Terrence Peart (JAM)
Clare McCabe (AUS)
Reserve umpire:
Theresa Prince (RSA)
Lennon 35/38 (92%)
McCullough 14/20 (70%)
Somerville 11/14 (79%)

Altifois-Fenelon 7/12 (58%)
Laurencin 9/11 (82%)
Maxwell 24/32 (75%)
Toner 1/3 (33%)

29 July 2014
11:30

Report
New Zealand
88 – 19
Saint Lucia

SECC Precinct
Umpires:
Theresa Prince (RSA)
Gary Burgess (ENG)
Reserve umpire:
Terrence Peart (JAM)
Brown 54/66 (82%)
Halpenny 15/18 (83%)
Leota 19/26 (73%)

Altifois-Fenelon 1/1 (100%)
Hippolyte 4/5 (80%)
Laurencin 1/1 (100%)
Maxwell 13/21 (62%)

== Shooting ==
St. Lucia has entered two sport shooters.

Men

Athlete	Event	Qualification		Final	
Athlete	Event	Points	Rank	Points	Rank
Lennox Mondesir	25 metre rapid fire pistol	214	13	did not advance	
Arthur Scott	25 metre rapid fire pistol	349	12	did not advance	

== Swimming ==
St.Lucia has entered two swimmers.

Men

Athlete	Event	Heat		Semifinal		Final	
Athlete	Event	Time	Rank	Time	Rank	Time	Rank
Jordan Augier	50 m freestyle	23.43	19	did not advance			
Joshua Daniel	50 m freestyle	24.01	28	did not advance			
Joshua Daniel	100 m freestyle	53.55	31	did not advance			
Jordan Augier	50 m backstroke	26.82	15 Q	26.82	15	did not advance	
Jordan Augier	100 m backstroke	59.36	21	did not advance			
Joshua Daniel	50 m butterfly	26.04	27	did not advance			

== Table tennis ==
St. Lucia has entered four athletes in table tennis.

Men

- Adrian Albert
- Omarie Ferdinand
- Jedaiah Pierre
- Chris Wells
