= Saint Lucia at the 2018 Commonwealth Games =

- Flag of Saint Lucia
- CGF code: LCA
- CGA: Saint Lucia Olympic Committee
- Website: slunoc.org

in Gold Coast, Australia 4 April 2018 – 15 April 2018
- Competitors: 13 in 3 sports
- Medals Ranked 26th: Gold 1 Silver 0 Bronze 0 Total 1

Commonwealth Games appearances (overview)
- 1962; 1966; 1970; 1974; 1978; 1982–1990; 1994; 1998; 2002; 2006; 2010; 2014; 2018; 2022; 2026; 2030

Saint Lucia competed at the 2018 Commonwealth Games in the Gold Coast, Australia from April 4 to April 15, 2018.

The Saint Lucia team consisted of 13 athletes (10 men and 3 women) that competed in three sports.

== Medalists ==
Medal	Name	Sport	Event	Date
Gold	Levern Spencer	Athletics	Women's High Jump	April 14

== Competitors ==
The following is the list of number of competitors participating at the Games per sport/discipline.

Sport	Men	Women	Total
Athletics	6	2	8
Boxing	3	0	3
Swimming	1	1	2
Total	10	3	13

== Athletics ==
Saint Lucia participated with 8 athletes (6 men and 2 women).

Men
Track & road events

Athlete	Event	Heat		Semifinal		Final	
Athlete	Event	Result	Rank	Result	Rank	Result	Rank
Stephan Charles	100 m	11.15	7	did not advance			
Nick Joseph	100 m	DSQ		did not advance			
Jonathan Celestin	200 m	21.92	5	did not advance			
Marvric Pamphile	400 m	48.66	5	did not advance			
Michael James	800 m	1:51.89	7	—		did not advance	

Field events

Athlete	Event	Qualification		Final	
Athlete	Event	Distance	Rank	Distance	Rank
Albert Reynolds	Javelin throw	78.10	6 Q	73.87	9

Women
Field events

Athlete	Event	Final	
Athlete	Event	Distance	Position
Jeanelle Scheper	High jump	1.80	9
Levern Spencer	High jump	1.95	1st place, gold medalist(s)

== Boxing ==
Saint Lucia participated with a team of 3 athletes (3 men)

Men

Athlete	Event	Round of 32	Round of 16	Quarterfinals	Semifinals	Final	Rank
Athlete	Event	Opposition Result	Opposition Result	Opposition Result	Opposition Result	Opposition Result	Rank
Nathan Ferrari	−64 kg	Colin Lewis (GUY); L 1–4	did not advance				
Lyndel Marcellin	−69 kg	BYE	Winston Hill (FIJ); L 2–3	did not advance			
Marvin Anthony	−75 kg	Wilfried Ntsengue (CMR); L 0–5	did not advance				

== Swimming ==
Saint Lucia participated with 2 athletes (1 man and 1 woman).

Athlete	Event	Heat		Semifinal		Final	
Athlete	Event	Time	Rank	Time	Rank	Time	Rank
Jean-Luc Zephir	Men's 50 m freestyle	23.45	23	did not advance			
Jean-Luc Zephir	Men's 100 m freestyle	51.66	30	did not advance			
Katie Kyle	Women's 50 m butterfly	28.80	17	did not advance			
Katie Kyle	Women's 100 m butterfly	1:05.74	20	did not advance			

== See also ==
- Saint Lucia at the 2018 Summer Youth Olympics
