= Saint Lucia at the Commonwealth Games =

- CGF code: LCA
- CGA: Saint Lucia Olympic Committee
- Website: slunoc.org
- Medals Ranked 44th: Gold 1 Silver 1 Bronze 3 Total 5

Commonwealth Games appearances (overview)
- 1962; 1966; 1970; 1974; 1978; 1982–1990; 1994; 1998; 2002; 2006; 2010; 2014; 2018; 2022; 2026; 2030

Saint Lucia first competed at the Commonwealth Games in 1962. They appeared again in 1970 and 1978, and have appeared in every Games since 1994. The first out of their three medals came in 2002 in the men's pole vault, a bronze from Dominic Johnson. Their second and third medals came in 2010 and 2014 in the women's high jump, 2 bronzes from Levern Spencer.

== Medals ==
Games	Gold	Silver	Bronze	Total
1962 Perth	0	0	0	0
1966 Kingston	did not attend			
1970 Edinburgh	0	0	0	0
1974 Christchurch	did not attend			
1978 Edmonton	0	0	0	0
1982 Brisbane	did not attend			
1986 Edinburgh	did not attend			
1990 Auckland	did not attend			
1994 Victoria	0	0	0	0
1998 Kuala Lumpur	0	0	0	0
2002 Manchester	0	0	1	1
2006 Melbourne	0	0	0	0
2010 Delhi	0	0	1	1
2014 Glasgow	0	0	1	1
2018 Gold Coast	1	0	0	1
2022 Birmingham	0	1	0	1
Total	1	1	3	5
