= Saint Lucia at the 2022 Commonwealth Games =

- Flag of Saint Lucia
- CG code: LCA
- CGA: Saint Lucia Olympic Committee
- Website: slunoc.org

in Birmingham, England 28 July 2022 – 8 August 2022
- Competitors: 13 (10 men and 3 women) in 4 sports
- Flag bearers: Arthur Langelier; Julien Alfred
- Medals Ranked =35th: Gold 0 Silver 1 Bronze 0 Total 1

Commonwealth Games appearances (overview)
- 1962; 1966; 1970; 1974; 1978; 1982–1990; 1994; 1998; 2002; 2006; 2010; 2014; 2018; 2022; 2026; 2030

Saint Lucia competed at the 2022 Commonwealth Games at Birmingham, England from 28 July – 8 August 2022. It was the team's 11th appearance at the Games.

On July 23, 2022, a team of 13 athletes (ten men and three women) competing in four sports was named. Arthur Langelier and Julien Alfred were the country's flagbearers during the opening ceremony.

== Medalists ==
Medal	Name	Sport	Event	Date
Silver	Julien Alfred	Athletics	Women's 100 m	3 August

== Competitors ==
The following is the list of number of competitors participating at the Games per sport/discipline.

Sport	Men	Women	Total
Athletics	5	2	7
Boxing	3	0	3
Swimming	1	1	2
Table tennis	1	0	1
Total	10	3	13

== Athletics ==
Men
Track and road events

Athlete	Event	Heat		Semifinal		Final	
Athlete	Event	Result	Rank	Result	Rank	Result	Rank
Stephan Charles	100 m	10.29	3 q	10.53	9	did not advance	
Delan Edwin	100 m	10.42	3	did not advance			
Delan Edwin	200 m	21.19	2 Q	21.32	5	did not advance	
Lenyn Leonce	200 m	21.22	3 q	21.53	8	did not advance	
Michael Joseph	400 m	47.08	3 Q	47.03	6	did not advance	
Michael Joseph; Delan Edwin; Lenyn Leonce; Stephan Charles	4 × 100 m relay	39.96	4 q	—N/a		40.17	5

Field events

Athlete	Event	Final	
Athlete	Event	Distance	Rank
Micky Ferdinand	Pole vault	NM	

Women
Track and road events

Athlete	Event	Heat		Semifinal		Final	
Athlete	Event	Result	Rank	Result	Rank	Result	Rank
Julien Alfred	100 m	11.24	1 Q	11.04	1 Q	11.01	2nd place, silver medalist(s)
Julien Alfred	200 m	DNS		did not advance			

Field events

Athlete	Event	Final	
Athlete	Event	Distance	Rank
Sandisha Antoine	Triple jump	13.01	9

== Boxing ==
A squad of three boxers was entered as of 9 July 2022.

Men

Athlete	Event	Round of 32	Round of 16	Quarterfinals	Semifinals	Final	
Athlete	Event	Opposition Result	Opposition Result	Opposition Result	Opposition Result	Opposition Result	Rank
Kyghan Mortley	Middleweight	Bye	Hickey (SCO); L 0 - 5	did not advance			
Arthur Langelier	Light heavyweight	Bye	Afoa (TUV); W WO	Changalawe (TAN); L RSC	did not advance		
Leran Regis	Super heavyweight	—N/a	Bye	Mau'u (NZL); L KO	did not advance		

== Swimming ==
Athlete	Event	Heat		Semifinal		Final	
Athlete	Event	Time	Rank	Time	Rank	Time	Rank
Jayhan Odlum-Smith	Men's 100 m freestyle	53.04	40	did not advance			
Jayhan Odlum-Smith	Men's 50 m butterfly	did not start		did not advance			
Mikaili Charlemagne	Women's 50 m freestyle	26.75	21	did not advance			
Mikaili Charlemagne	Women's 50 m butterfly	28.48	26	did not advance			

== Table tennis ==
Athletes	Event	Group stage			Round of 32	Round of 16	Quarterfinal	Semifinal	Final / BM	
Athletes	Event	Opposition Score	Opposition Score	Rank	Opposition Score	Opposition Score	Opposition Score	Opposition Score	Opposition Score	Rank
De Andre Calderon	Men's singles	Watson (JAM); W 4 - 2	Leong (MAS); L 0 - 4	2	did not advance					

== Withdrawn sport ==
=== 3x3 basketball ===
By virtue of its status as the top Commonwealth Caribbean nation in the FIBA 3x3 Federation Rankings for women (on 1 November 2021), Saint Lucia was originally invited to play in the women's tournament. However, the basketball federation declined the invitation on account of not being able to send an adequately prepared squad to the Games.
