= Saint Lucia at the 2025 World Athletics Championships =

- Flag of Saint Lucia
- WA code: LCA

in Tokyo, Japan 13 September 2025 – 21 September 2025
- Competitors: 2 (0 men and 2 women)
- Medals Ranked 41st: Gold 0 Silver 0 Bronze 1 Total 1

World Athletics Championships appearances (overview)
- 1983; 1987; 1991; 1993; 1995; 1997; 1999; 2001; 2003; 2005; 2007; 2009; 2011; 2013; 2015; 2017; 2019; 2022; 2023; 2025

Saint Lucia competed at the 2025 World Athletics Championships in Tokyo, Japan, from 13 to 21 September 2025.

== Medalists ==
Medal	Athlete	Event	Date
3rd place, bronze medalist(s)	Julien Alfred	Women's 100 metres	14 September

== Results ==
Saint Lucia entered 2 athletes.

Key

- Q = Qualified for the next round
- q = Qualified for the next round as a fastest loser or, in field events, by position without achieving the qualifying target
- NR = National record
- PB = Personal best
- SB = Season best
- N/A = Round not applicable for the event

=== Women ===
Track and road events

Athlete	Event	Heat		Semi-final		Final	
Athlete	Event	Result	Rank	Result	Rank	Result	Rank
Julien Alfred	100 metres	10.93	1 Q	10.93	1 Q	10.84	3rd place, bronze medalist(s)
Aasia Laurencin	100 metres hurdles	13.03	5	Did not advance			
