= Saint Lucia at the 2026 Commonwealth Games =

- Flag of Saint Lucia
- CG code: LCA
- CGA: Saint Lucia Olympic Committee
- Website: slunoc.org

in Glasgow, Scotland 23 July 2026 – 2 August 2026
- Competitors: 3 in 1 sport
- Flag bearer: Helena Renee
- Baton bearer: Volunteer
- Medals: Gold 0 Silver 0 Bronze 0 Total 0

Commonwealth Games appearances (overview)
- 1962; 1966; 1970; 1974; 1978; 1982–1990; 1994; 1998; 2002; 2006; 2010; 2014; 2018; 2022; 2026; 2030

Saint Lucia competed at the 2026 Commonwealth Games in Glasgow, Scotland. This marked Saint Lucia's 12th participation at the games, after making its debut at the 1962 Commonwealth Games.

The King's Baton relay stopped in Saint Lucia in March 2025. The Saint Lucian team consisted of three male track and field athletes.

Saint Lucia's only medalist at the 2022 Commonwealth Games, Julien Alfred decided to skip these games.

Chef de mission Helena Renee was the country's flagbearer during the opening ceremony. Meanwhile, a volunteer was the baton bearer during the opening ceremony.

Saint Lucia completed its participation with no medals won.

== Competitors ==
The following is the list of number of competitors participating at the Games per sport/discipline.

Sport	Men	Women	Total
Athletics	3	0	3
Total	3	0	3

== Athletics (track and field) ==
Saint Lucia entered three male athletes.

Key

- Q = Qualified for the next round
- q = Qualified for the next round as a fastest loser or, in field events, by position without achieving the qualifying target

Men
Track events

Athlete	Event	Round one		Semifinal		Final	
Athlete	Event	Result	Rank	Result	Rank	Result	Rank
Michael Joseph	400 m	45.84	3 q	46.69	6	Did not advance	
Marvric Pamphile	400 m	47.12	4	Did not advance			
Kaelan Vitalis	110 m hurdles	14.46	6	—N/a		Did not advance	

== See also ==
- Saint Lucia at the 2024 Summer Olympics
