= List of Saint Lucian records in athletics =

The following are the national records in athletics in Saint Lucia maintained by its national athletics federation: Saint Lucia Athletics Association (SLAA).

== Outdoor ==
Key to tables: Awaiting ratification Record not kept by SLAA Not ratified or later rescinded by SLAA

=== Men ===
| Event | Record | Athlete | Date | Meet | Place | Ref. |
|---|---|---|---|---|---|---|
| 100 m | 10.17 (+1.6 m/s) (Note: by current World Athletics Statistic Handbook) | Ronald Promesse | 6 May 2000 | | El Paso, United States | |
| 100 m | 10.16 (+1.9 m/s) (Note: by World Athletics profile) | Jahvid Best | 2 April 2016 | Arnie Robinson Invitational | San Diego, United States | |
| 200 m | 20.63 (+1.6 m/s) | Corneil Lionel | 18 April 2015 | John Jacobs Invitational | Norman, United States | |
| 200 m | 20.41 (+0.8 m/s) | Michael Joseph | 14 May 2023 | Big 12 Championships | Norman, United States | |
| 400 m | 44.77 | Michael Joseph | 13 May 2023 | Big 12 Championships | Norman, United States | |
| 800 m | 1:47.83 | Marbeq Edgar | 5 May 2017 | Tom Tellez Invitational | Houston, United States | |
| 1500 m | 3:48.50 | Zepherinus Joseph | 31 March 2001 | | Gainesville, United States | |
| 3000 m | 8:36.41 | Zepherinus Joseph | 10 April 1999 | | Tempe, United States | |
| 5000 m | 14:25.20 | Zepherinus Joseph | 20 July 2001 | Francophone Games | Ottawa, Canada | |
| 10,000 m | 29:48.97 | Zepherinus Joseph | 23 March 2001 | | Tallahassee, United States | |
| Half marathon | 1:04:52 | Zepherinus Joseph | 28 November 2002 | Outback Half Marathon | Jacksonville, United States | |
| Marathon | 2:16:06 | Zepherinus Joseph | 5 October 2003 | Twin Cities Marathon | Saint Paul, United States | |
| 110 m hurdles | 13.59 (+0.7 m/s) | Khailan Vitalis | 16 May 2026 | ACC Championships | Louisville, United States | |
| 400 m hurdles | 52.45 | Alva Henry | 6 May 2018 | MIAA Championships | Kearney, United States | |
| 3000 m steeplechase | | | | | | |
| High jump | 2.31 m | Darvin Edwards | 30 August 2011 | World Championships | Daegu, South Korea | |
| Pole vault | 5.70 m | Dominic Johnson | 26 August 2000 | | El Paso, United States | |
| Long jump | 7.82 m | Dane Magloire | 10 May 2000 | | Durham, United States | |
| Triple jump | 16.11 m (−3.4 m/s) | Jeremiah James | 1 May 2010 | Front Range Classic | Fort Collins, United States | |
| Shot put | 14.57 m | Akeem Herbert | 16 June 2002 | | Castries, Saint Lucia | |
| Discus throw | 48.79 m | Denzel Phillips | 13 December 2025 | Tyser-Mills Classics | Spanish Town, Jamaica | |
| Hammer throw | 48.07 m | Jaryl Bernard | 6 May 2022 | | Oskaloosa, United States | |
| Javelin throw | 82.19 m | Albert Reynolds | 10 August 2019 | Pan American Games | Lima, Peru | |
| Decathlon | 7632 pts | Dominic Johnson | 27–28 March 1998 | | Tucson, United States | |
| Decathlon | 100m (wind) / Long jump (wind) / Shot put / High jump / 400m / 110m H (wind) / Discus / Pole vault / Javelin / 1500m; 10.71 / 6.80 m / 12.83 m / 1.97 m / 47.43 / 14.79 / 39.38 m / 4.90 m / 38.08 m / 4:29.50 | | | | | |
| Decathlon | 7764 pts (Note: wind-assisted under the rules of the day) | Dominic Johnson | 16–17 May 1998 | | Stanford, United States | |
| Decathlon | 100m (wind) / Long jump (wind) / Shot put / High jump / 400m / 110m H (wind) / Discus / Pole vault / Javelin / 1500m | | | | | |
| 20 km walk (road) | | | | | | |
| 50 km walk (road) | | | | | | |
| 4 × 100 m relay | 39.96 | Saint Lucia; Michael Joseph; Delan Edwin; Lenyn Leonce; Stephan Charles | 6 August 2022 | Commonwealth Games | Birmingham, United Kingdom | |
| 4 × 400 m relay | 3:10.45 | Saint Lucia; Rosen Daniel; Corneil Lionel; Marbeq Edgar; Talberc Poleon | 6 July 2014 | OECS Championships | Basseterre, Saint Kitts and Nevis | |

=== Women ===
| Event | Record | Athlete | Date | Meet | Place | Ref. |
|---|---|---|---|---|---|---|
| 100 m | 10.70 (−0.7 m/s) | Julien Alfred | 27 August 2026 | Weltklasse Zürich | Zurich, Switzerland | |
| 150 m (bend) | 16.25+ (−0.6 m/s) | Julien Alfred | 19 July 2025 | London Athletics Meet | London, United Kingdom | |
| 200 m | 21.51 (+0.9 m/s) | Julien Alfred | 10 July 2026 | Herculis | Fontvieille, Monaco | |
| 300 m | 36.05 | Julien Alfred | 5 April 2025 | Miramar Invitational | Miramar, United States | |
| 400 m | 52.21 | Verneta Lesforis | 25 June 1999 | Central American and Caribbean Championships | Bridgetown, Barbados | |
| 800 m | 2:06.30 | Augustina Charles | 26 June 1999 | Central American and Caribbean Championships | Bridgetown, Barbados | |
| 1500 m | 4:39.38 | Nessa Paul | 5 May 2006 | | Bloomington, United States | |
| 3000 m | 10:14.14 | Nessa Paul | 6 May 2004 | | Bloomington, United States | |
| 5000 m | 18:13.22 | Nessa Paul | 29 May 2004 | | Louisville, United States | |
| 5 km (road) | 21:14.00 | Laura Lynn Limery | 19 October 2025 | Kwéyòl 5K Run | Gros Islet, Saint Lucia | |
| 10,000 m | 39:02.56 Mx | Nessa Paul | 13 May 2004 | | St. Charles, United States | |
| 10 km (road) | 44:54.1 | Laura Lynn Limery | 3 July 2023 | CARICOM 10K | Port of Spain, Trinidad and Tobago | |
| 15 km (road) | 1:12:48+ | Ava Fevrier | 16 March 2025 | New York City Half Marathon | New York City, United States | |
| 20 km (road) | 1:37:00+ | Ava Fevrier | 16 March 2025 | New York City Half Marathon | New York City, United States | |
| Half marathon | 1:42:03 | Ava Fevrier | 16 March 2025 | New York City Half Marathon | New York City, United States | |
| 25 km (road) | 2:08:14+ | Ava Fevrier | 13 October 2024 | Chicago Marathon | Chicago, United States | |
| 30 km (road) | 2:37:33+ | Ava Fevrier | 27 April 2025 | London Marathon | London, United Kingdom | |
| Marathon | 3:48:41 | Ava Fevrier | 27 April 2025 | London Marathon | London, United Kingdom | |
| 100 m hurdles | 13.52 (+1.0 m/s) (Note: record set during heptathlon competition) | Makeba Alcide | 6 June 2013 | NCAA Division I Championships | Eugene, United States | |
| 100 m hurdles | 12.69 (+2.0 m/s) | Aasia Laurencin | 15 June 2025 | Johnny Loaring Classic | Windsor, Canada | |
| 400 m hurdles | 1:00.62 | Kassandra Pierre | 14 May 2015 | Big South Championships | High Point United States | |
| 3000 m steeplechase | | | | | | |
| High jump | 1.98 m | Levern Spencer | 8 May 2010 | Georgia Invitational | Athens, United States | |
| Pole vault | 3.00 m | Naya Jules | 19 April 2025 | CARIFTA Games | Port of Spain, Trinidad and Tobago | |
| Long jump | 6.47 m | Michelle Baptiste | 4 May 1996 | | Springfield, United States | |
| Triple jump | 13.91 m (+1.7 m/s) | Sandisha Antoine | 1 August 2018 | CAC Games | Barranquilla, Colombia | |
| Shot put | 14.67 m | Tressa-Anne Charles | 26 June 2004 | Central American and Caribbean Junior Championships | Coatzacoalcos, Mexico | |
| Shot put | 15.31 m | Joy Edward | 13 April 2024 | Troy Doc Anderson Invitational & Multi | Troy, United States | |
| Discus throw | 44.52 m | Tamara Popo | 27 March 2004 | | Indianapolis, United States | |
| Hammer throw | 48.90 m | Kayla-Rae Gordon | 1 June 2019 | | Fort Lauderdale, United States | |
| Hammer throw | 49.85 m | Lauralynn Clifford | 23 April 2022 | UofSC Open | South Carolina, United States | |
| Hammer throw | 56.55 m | Lauralynn Clifford | 20 April 2024 | USC Outdoor Open | South Carolina, United States | |
| Javelin throw | 57.22 m | Erma-Gene Evans | 29 March 2008 | UTEP Springtime Invitational | El Paso, United States | |
| Heptathlon | 6050 pts | Makeba Alcide | 6–7 June 2013 | NCAA Division I Championships | Eugene, United States | |
| Heptathlon | 100m H (wind) / High jump / Shot put / 200m (wind) / Long jump (wind) / Javelin / 800m; 13.52 (+1.0 m/s) / 1.81 m / 12.35 m / 24.18w (+2.3 m/s) / 6.05 m w (+2.7 m/s) / 34.65 m / 2:12.05 | | | | | |
| 20 km walk (road) | | | | | | |
| 4 × 100 m relay | 46.78 | Saint Lucia; Jineill O'Neil; Michelle Baptiste; Augustina Charles; Vernetta Lesforis | 26 June 1999 | Central American and Caribbean Championships | Bridgetown, Barbados | |
| 4 × 400 m relay | 3:51.51 | Saint Lucia; M. Hippolye; M. Louis; J. Sealy; K. Charles | 17 June 2018 | | Vieux Fort, Saint Lucia | |

=== Mixed ===
| Event | Record | Athlete | Date | Meet | Place | Ref. |
|---|---|---|---|---|---|---|
| 4 × 400 m relay | 3:37.56 | Saint Lucia; Rayshawn Harris; Hannah Charles; Kimalie Theodore; Alexandra Johnson | 31 March 2024 | CARIFTA Games | St. George's, Grenada | |

== Indoor ==
=== Men ===
| Event | Record | Athlete | Date | Meet | Place | Ref. |
|---|---|---|---|---|---|---|
| 55 m | 6.13 A | Ronald Promesse | 22 February 1997 | WAC Championships | Colorado Springs, United States | |
| 60 m | 6.66 A | Ronald Promesse | 19 February 1999 | | Colorado Springs, United States | |
| 200 m | 20.76 A | Michael Joseph | 28 February 2025 | Big 12 Championships | Lubbock, United States | |
| 300 m | 35.03 | Khailan Vitalis | 10 January 2026 | Clemson Invitational | Clemson, United States | |
| 400 m | 45.46 A | Michael Joseph | 24 February 2024 | Big 12 Championships | Lubbock, United States | |
| 500 m | 1:03.87 | Michael James | 16 January 2016 | Great Dane Classic | Staten Island, United States | |
| 600 m | 1:18.15 | Michael Joseph | 3 February 2023 | Frank Sevigne Husker Invitational | Lincoln, United States | |
| 800 m | 1:49.70 | Michael James | 28 February 2016 | Boston University Last Chance Meet | Boston, United States | |
| 800 m | 1:49.70 | Michael James | 6 March 2016 | IC4A/ECAC Championships | Boston, United States | |
| 1000 m | 2:28.66 | Asa Francis | 6 December 2025 | Youree Spence Garcia Invitational | Staten Island, United States | |
1500 m
| 1500 m | 4:07.58 | Michael James | 3 December 2016 | Navy Invitational | Annapolis, United States | |
| Mile | 4:11.45 | Zepherinus Joseph | 4 February 2001 | Gator Invitational | Gainesville, United States | |
| 3000 m | 8:17.20 | Zepherinus Joseph | 9 February 2003 | | Gainesville, United States | |
| 5000 m | 14:26.80 | Zepherinus Joseph | 9 February 2002 | | Indianapolis, United States | |
| 60 m hurdles | 8.14 | Giovanni Alfred | 1 February 2020 | | Bloomington, United States | |
| 60 m hurdles | 7.75 A | Khailan Vitalis | 18 January 2025 | Corky Classic | Lubbock, United States | |
| High jump | 2.25 m | Darvin Edwards | 27 January 2008 | | Uxbridge, United Kingdom | |
| Pole vault | 5.55 m | Dominic Johnson | 13 March 1998 | | Indianapolis, United States | |
| Long jump | 7.70 m | Dane Magloire | 20 January 2001 | | Blacksburg, United States | |
| Triple jump | 16.21 m | Dane Magloire | 19 January 2001 | | Blacksburg, United States | |
| Shot put | 12.79 m | Dominic Johnson | 16 January 1999 | | Manhattan, United States | |
| Shot put | 13.02 m | Jaryl Bernard | 22 January 2021 | Graceland Winter Series #2 | Lamoni, United States | |
| Weight throw | 13.25 m | Jaryl Bernard | 5 February 2021 | Graceland Winter Series #5 | Lamoni, United States | |
| Heptathlon | 5675 pts | Dominic Johnson | 15–16 January 1999 | | Manhattan, United States | |
| Heptathlon | 60m / Long jump / Shot put / High jump / 60m H / Pole vault / 1000m; 7.13 / 6.90 m / 12.79 m / 2.06 m / 8.47 / 4.70 m / 2:42.22 | | | | | |
| 5000 m walk | | | | | | |
| 4 × 400 m relay | | | | | | |

Notes - 200m 21.42A Ronald Promesse 22.02.97 Colorado Springs : oversized track
21.22A Ronald Promesse 28.02.98 Colorado Springs : oversized track

=== Women ===
| Event | Record | Athlete | Date | Meet | Place | Ref. |
|---|---|---|---|---|---|---|
| 55 m | 6.99 | Pernell Joseph | 2 December 2012 | Arkansas State Kickoff Classic | Jonesboro, United States | |
| 60 m | 6.94 A | Julien Alfred | 11 March 2023 | NCAA Division I Championships | Albuquerque, United States | |
| 200 m | 22.01 A | Julien Alfred | 11 March 2023 | NCAA Division I Championships | Albuquerque, United States | |
| 300 m | 36.16 | Julien Alfred | 2 February 2025 | New Balance Indoor Grand Prix | Boston, United States | |
| 400 m | 52.97 | Julien Alfred | 14 February 2025 | Tiger Paw Invitational | Clemson, United States | |
| 800 m | 2:07.16 | Leander Ernest | 24 January 2009 | Razorback Invitational | Fayetteville, United States | |
| 800 m | 2:07.14 OT | Leander Ernest | 14 February 2009 | | Ames, United States | |
| 1500 m | | | | | | |
| 3000 m | 10:26.56 | Nessa Paul | 13 February 2004 | | Fayetteville, United States | |
| 60 m hurdles | 7.97 | Aasia Laurencin | 1 March 2025 | Big Ten Indoor Championships | Indianapolis, United States | |
| High jump | 1.95 m | Levern Spencer | 7 March 2014 | World Championships | Sopot, Poland | |
| High jump | 1.95 m | Levern Spencer | 13 February 2016 | | Hustopeče, Czech Republic | |
| High jump | 1.95 m | Levern Spencer | 30 April 2016 | Drake Relays | Des Moines, United States | |
| High jump | 1.95 m | Levern Spencer | 30 January 2018 | Beskydská laťka | Třinec, Czech Republic | |
Pole vault
| Pole vault | 3.05 m | Naya Jules | 10 January 2026 | Friends University First-Chance Qualifier | Wichita, United States | |
| Long jump | 6.38 m | Michelle Baptiste | 28 February 1997 | | Ames, United States | |
| Triple jump | 12.40 m | Michelle Baptiste | 20 February 1999 | | Cedar Falls, United States | |
| Shot put | 13.46 m | Makeba Alcide | 18 March 2016 | World Championships | Portland, United States | |
| Shot put | 14.85 m | Joy Edward | 10 February 2024 | Music City Challenge | Nashville, United States | |
| Weight throw | 18.99 m | Lauralyn Clifford | 25 February 2025 | Sun Belt Conference Championship | Birmingham, United States | |
| Pentathlon | 4569 pts | Makeba Alcide | 22 February 2013 | SEC Championships | Fayetteville, United States | |
| Pentathlon | 60m H / High jump / Shot put / Long jump / 800m; 8.35 / 1.87 m / 12.32 m / 6.15 m / 2:16.37 | | | | | |
| 3000 m walk | | | | | | |
| 4 × 400 m relay | | | | | | |

== Junior ==
=== Men ===
| Event | Record | Athlete | Date | Meet | Place | Age | Ref. |
|---|---|---|---|---|---|---|---|
| 100 m | 10.54 (±0.0 m/s) | Nick Joseph | 1 April 2017 | Saint Lucian Junior Championships | Vieux Fort Quarter, Saint Lucia | 19 years, 11 days | |
| 200 m | 21.32 | Jovon Stephen | 2013 | | Vieux Fort, Saint Lucia | | |
| 400 m | 46.53 A | Michael Joseph | 1 December 2021 | Junior Pan American Games | Cali, Colombia | | |
| 800 m | 1:50.39 | Bernard Henry | 10 April 1988 | CARIFTA Games | Kingston, Jamaica | | |
| 1500 m | 3:58.72 | Marbeq Edgar | 19 April 2014 | CARIFTA Games | Fort-de-France, Martinique | | |
| 5000 m | 15:19.12 | Zepherinus Joseph | 10 July 1994 | | Port of Spain, Trinidad & Tobago | 18 years, 331 days | |
| 10,000 m | | | | | | | |
| 110 m hurdles (99/100 cm) | 14.09 (−1.7 m/s) | Khailan Vitalis | 5 March 2022 | Corporate Area Development Meet | Kingston, Jamaica | | |
| 400 m hurdles (84 cm) | 54.20 | Deandre Isidore | 8 March 2025 | Corporate Area Development Meet | Kingston, Jamaica | 16 years, 66 days | |
| 3000 m steeplechase | | | | | | | |
| High jump | 2.15 m | Darvin Edwards | 30 July 2005 | Pan American Junior Championships | Windsor, Canada | 18 years, 322 days | |
| Pole vault | 5.00 m | Dominic Johnson | 11 June 1994 | | Sacramento, United States | 18 years, 223 days | |
| Long jump | 7.48 m (+0.6 m/s) | Lenyn Leonce | 1 May 2010 | Front Range Classic | Fort Collins, United States | | |
| Triple jump | 15.42 m | Jeremiah James | July 2006 | Windward Islands School Games | Vieux Fort, Saint Lucia | | |
| Shot put | 16.33 m | Denzel Phillips | 17 January 2026 | World Class Development Meet | Jamaica College, Kingston, Jamaica | 18 years, 316 days | |
| Discus throw | 52.53 m | Denzel Phillips | 28 February 2025 | JAAA CARIFTA Trials | GC Foster College, Kingston, Jamaica | 17 years, 358 days | |
| Hammer throw | | | | | | | |
| Javelin throw | 69.13 m | Albert Reynolds | 8 July 2007 | | São Paulo, Brazil | 19 years, 102 days | |
| Decathlon | | | | | | | |
| Decathlon | 100m (wind) / Long jump (wind) / Shot put / High jump / 400m / 110m H (wind) / Discus / Pole vault / Javelin / 1500m | | | | | | |
| 4 × 100 m relay | 41.69 | Saint Lucia; Lenyn Leonce; Jonathan Celestin; Eldon Charley; Jerren St Clair | 12 April 2009 | CARIFTA Games | Vieux Fort, Saint Lucia | | |
| 4 × 400 m relay | 3:21.67 | Saint Lucia; J. Baptiste; Maxime Charlemagne; Shobia Longville; Ron Promesse | 11 April 1993 | CARIFTA Games | Fort-de-France, Martinique | 18 years, 196 days 18 years, 223 days | |

=== Women ===
| Event | Record | Athlete | Date | Meet | Place | Age | Ref. |
|---|---|---|---|---|---|---|---|
| 100 m | 11.23 (+1.9 m/s) | Naomi London | 27 March 2025 | Texas Relays | Austin, United States | 18 years, 9 days | |
| 200 m | 22.90 (+1.2 m/s) | Julien Alfred | 12 May 2019 | Big 12 Championships | Norman, United States | 17 years, 336 days | |
| 400 m | 54.61 | Kimani Alphonse | 22 July 2018 | Windward Islands School Games | Vieux Fort, Saint Lucia | | |
| 800 m | 2:15.1 h | Augustina Charles | 26 May 1996 | Whitsuntide Games | St. George's, Grenada | | |
| 1500 m | 4:50.08 | Nessa Paul | 5 July 2002 | | Bridgetown, Barbados | | |
| 3000 m | 10:25.23 | Nessa Paul | 7 July 2002 | | Bridgetown, Barbados | | |
| 5000 m | 18:33.2 | Nessa Paul | 7 May 2000 | | Castries, Saint Lucia | | |
| 10,000 m | | | | | | | |
| 100 m hurdles | 15.10 w (+2.9 m/s) | Makeba Alcide | 11 April 2009 | CARIFTA Games | Vieux Fort, Saint Lucia | 19 years, 46 days | |
| 400 m hurdles | 1:01.61 | Gehian Regis | 3 June 2007 | PSAL City Championship | Randall's Island, United States | | |
| 3000 m steeplechase | | | | | | | |
| High jump | 1.92 m A | Jeanelle Scheper | 5 July 2013 | CAC Championships | Morelia, Mexico | 18 years, 226 days | |
| Pole vault | 3.00 m | Naya Jules | 19 April 2025 | CARIFTA Games | Port of Spain, Trinidad and Tobago | 17 years, 129 days | |
| Long jump | 6.47 m (±0.0 m/s) | Michelle Baptiste | 4 May 1996 | | Springfield, United States | 18 years, 251 days | |
| Triple jump | 12.78 m (+1.2 m/s) | Sandisha Antoine | 19 June 2010 | | Fort-de-France, Saint Lucia | 18 years, 226 days | |
| Shot put | 14.67 m | Tressa-Anne Charles | 26 June 2004 | Central American and Caribbean Junior Championships | Coatzacoalcos, Mexico | | |
| Discus throw | 35.74 m | Adella Paul | 5 April 1989 | | St. George's, Grenada | | |
| Hammer throw | 48.67 m | Kayla-Rae Gordon | 25 October 2018 | Broward Elite Athletic Club Fall Throws Meet | Fort Lauderdale, United States | | |
| Javelin throw | 49.67 m | Erma-Gene Evans | 20 July 2003 | Pan American Junior Championships | Bridgetown, Barbados | 19 years, 175 days | |
| Pentathlon | 3534 pts | Makeba Alcide | 11–12 April 2009 | CARIFTA Games | Vieux Fort, Saint Lucia | 19 years, 47 days | |
| Pentathlon | 15.10 (+2.9 m/s) / 828 (100 m hurdles), 4.89 m (+4.8 m/s) / 530 (long jump), 11.73 m / 643 (shot put), 1.63 m / 771 (high jump), 2:24.59 / 762 (800 metres) | | | | | | |
| Heptathlon | 4341 pts | Rochelle Etienne | 1–2 April 2017 | Saint Lucian Junior Championships | Vieux Fort Quarter, Saint Lucia | | |
| Heptathlon | 100m H (wind) / High jump / Shot put / 200m (wind) / Long jump (wind) / Javelin / 800m | | | | | | |
| 4 × 100 m relay | 47.58 | Saint Lucia; Johnell Leo; Merica Moncherry; Shanne Thomas; Sandisha Antoine | 23 March 2008 | CARIFTA Games | Basseterre, Saint Kitts | 16 years, 139 days | |
| 4 × 400 m relay | 3:51.51 | Survivors; Mya Hippolyte; Mia Louis; Jeanne Sealy; Kayla Charles | 17 June 2018 | National Championships | Vieux Fort, Saint Lucia | | |
