= Saint Lucia at the 2013 World Championships in Athletics =

- WA code: LCA

in Moscow
- Competitors: 3
- Medals: Gold 0 Silver 0 Bronze 0 Total 0

World Championships in Athletics appearances
- 1983; 1987; 1991; 1993; 1995; 1997; 1999; 2001; 2003; 2005; 2007; 2009; 2011; 2013; 2015; 2017; 2019; 2022; 2023; 2025

Saint Lucia competed at the 2013 World Championships in Athletics in Moscow, Russia, from 10–18 August 2013. A team of three athletes was announced to represent the country in the event.

== Results ==
(q – qualified, NM – no mark, SB – season best)

=== Women ===
Field events

Athlete	Event	Preliminaries		Final	
Athlete	Event	Width Height	Rank	Width Height	Rank
Jeanelle Scheper	High jump	1.83	24	did not advance	
Levern Spencer	High jump	1.92	11 q	1.89	11

Heptathlon

Makeba Alcide	Heptathlon			
Makeba Alcide	Event	Results	Points	Rank
	100 m hurdles	13.73	1017	14
	High jump	1.80	978	12
	Shot put	11.82	649	30
	200 m	24.96	890	18
	Long jump	5.62	735	30
	Javelin throw	37.09	612	29
	800 m	2:16.65	870	20
Total			5751	28
