= Russ Buller =

American pole vaulter (born 1978)

Personal information
- Born: September 10, 1978 (age 47)

Sport
- Country: United States
- Sport: Athletics
- Event: Pole vault
Medal record
Pan American Games
Silver medal – second place	2003 Santo Domingo	Pole vault

Russ Buller (born September 10, 1978) is an American former athlete who specialized in the pole vault.

Raised in Westlake, Louisiana, Buller competed on the athletics team at the Louisiana State University and became the most successful pole vaulter in the program's history. In 2000 he won both the indoor and outdoor NCAA Division I championships. He was a seven-time All-American and six-time SEC champion.

Buller won the pole vault at the 2006 USA Outdoor Track and Field Championships, finishing ahead of Olympic silver medalist Toby Stevenson, who he had been second to at the 2003 Pan American Games in Santo Domingo. His career also included an appearance at the 2001 World Championships in Edmonton, a fourth place finish at the 2001 Summer Universiade in Beijing and a fifth placing at the 2006 IAAF World Cup in Athens.

== Personal life ==
Buller is married to Canadian Olympic pole vaulter Dana Ellis.
