= Entrepot Secondary School =

Secondary school in Castries, Saint Lucia

Location
- Water Works Road; Entrepot, Castries; Saint Lucia
- Coordinates: 14°00′15″N 60°58′56″W

Information
- Established: 10 January 1972
- Principal: Arthur Scott
- Enrolment: 635
- Website: ess.edu.lc

Entrepot Secondary School is a secondary school located in Entrepot, Castries, Saint Lucia. The school educates about 635 students in Form 1 through Form 5. The principal since 2003 is Arthur Scott.

The school first opened as Entrepot Junior Secondary School on 10 January 1972. It became a full secondary school in 1984.

== Notable alumni ==
- Darvin Edwards, Olympic high jumper
- Levern Spencer, Olympic high jumper
