= Saint Lucia at the 1962 British Empire and Commonwealth Games =

- CGF code: LCA
- CGA: Saint Lucia Olympic Committee
- Website: slunoc.org

in Perth, Western Australia
- Competitors: 1 in 1 sport
- Flag bearers: Opening: Closing:
- Medals: Gold 0 Silver 0 Bronze 0 Total 0

British Empire and Commonwealth Games appearances
- 1962; 1966; 1970; 1974; 1978; 1982–1990; 1994; 1998; 2002; 2006; 2010; 2014; 2018; 2022; 2026; 2030

Saint Lucia competed at the 1962 British Empire and Commonwealth Games in Perth, Western Australia, from 22 November to 1 December 1962.

== Athletics ==
Men's field events
Athlete	Event	Final	
Athlete	Event	Distance	Rank
Imbert Roberts	Shot put	43 ft 9 in (13.34 m)	13
Imbert Roberts	Discus throw	118 ft 2 1/2 in (36.03 m)	12
