= List of flag bearers for Saint Lucia at the Olympics =

Saint Lucia at the Olympics
- IOC code: LCA
- NOC: Saint Lucia Olympic Committee
- Website: www.slunoc.org
- Medals: Gold 1 Silver 1 Bronze 0 Total 2

Summer appearances
- 1996; 2000; 2004; 2008; 2012; 2016; 2020; 2024

This is a list of flag bearers who have represented Saint Lucia at the Olympics.

Flag bearers carry the national flag of their country at the opening ceremony of the Olympic Games.

#	Event year	Season	Flag bearer	Sport	Ref.
1	1996	Summer	Michelle Baptiste	Athletics	
2	2000	Summer	Dominic Johnson	Athletics	
3	2004	Summer	Zepherinus Joseph	Athletics	
4	2008	Summer	Lavern Spencer	Athletics	
5	2012	Summer	Lavern Spencer	Athletics	
6	2016	Summer	Lavern Spencer	Athletics	
7	2020	Summer	Lavern Spencer	Athletics	
7	2020	Summer	Jean-Luc Zephir	Swimming	
8	2024	Summer	Michael Joseph	Athletics	

== See also ==
- Saint Lucia at the Olympics
