= Corneil Lionel =

Saint Lucian track and field athlete (born 1991)

Corneil Jaycee (or Jessie) Lionel is a Saint Lucian track and field athlete. Born 28 October 1991 in Saint Lucia, Lionel attended Entrepot Secondary School, then went on to Iowa Western Junior College, and Abilene Christian University. He holds Iowa Western records in the men's indoor 60m and 200m.

Lionel competes internationally for Saint Lucia, and was named Saint Lucia's athlete of the year for 2014. Lionel's mother is Cornelia Jean Baptiste, the first woman ever to represent Saint Lucia at the IAAF World Championships in Athletics, in Helsinki 1983.

Lionel holds the Saint Lucia national record for the men's 200m run. He ran 20.63 (+1.6 m/s) on 18 April 2015 at the John Jacobs Invitational in Norman, Oklahoma, United States of America.

Lionel also holds the national record for the indoor 200 m, having run 21.19 on 6 February 2016 at the Charlie Thomas Invitational, where he placed fifth.

Along with Rosen Daniel, Marbeq Edgar, and Talberc Poleon, Lionel ran 3:10.45 to set a Saint Lucia national record for the men's 4x400m relay at the 2014 OECS Championships in Basseterre, Saint Kitts, and Nevis.

In 2014, Lionel competed at the 20th Commonwealth Games in Glasgow, Scotland, United Kingdom. He did not advance from the opening round, finishing fourth in the qualifying rounds of both the 100m and 200m at Hampden Park.

In 2015, Lionel competed at the Pan Am Games in Toronto, Canada.

In 2016, Lionel ran one of the fastest times in Abilene Christian University history at the third annual Wes Kittley Invitational at Elmer Gray Stadium. Lionel won the 100 in 10.26 seconds and ranked 10th all-time in Wildcat history.
