= Athletics at the 2018 Commonwealth Games – Women's high jump =

Women's high jump at the 2018 Commonwealth Games
- Venue: Carrara Stadium
- Dates: 14 April
- Competitors: 14 from 11 nations
- Winning height: 1.95 m

Medalists
| gold medal | Levern Spencer | Saint Lucia |
| silver medal | Morgan Lake | England |
| bronze medal | Nicola McDermott | Australia |

The women's high jump at the 2018 Commonwealth Games, as part of the athletics programme, took place in the Carrara Stadium on 14 April 2018.

== Records ==
Prior to this competition, the existing world and Games records were as follows:

| World record | Stefka Kostadinova (BUL) | 2.09 m | Rome, Italy | 30 August 1987 |
| Games record | Hestrie Cloete (RSA) | 1.96 m | Manchester, England | 30 July 2002 |

== Schedule ==
The schedule was as follows:

| Date | Time | Round |
|---|---|---|
| Saturday 14 April 2018 | 14:25 | Final |

All times are Australian Eastern Standard Time (UTC+10)

== Results ==
With fourteen entrants, the event was held as a straight final.

=== Final ===
| Rank | Athlete | 1.60 | 1.65 | 1.70 | 1.75 | 1.80 | 1.84 | 1.87 | 1.89 | 1.91 | 1.93 | 1.95 | 1.97 | 2.00 | Result | Notes |
|---|---|---|---|---|---|---|---|---|---|---|---|---|---|---|---|---|
| 1st place, gold medalist(s) | Levern Spencer (LCA) | – | – | – | – | xo | xo | o | o | o | xo | o | x– | xr | 1.95 | SB |
| 2nd place, silver medalist(s) | Morgan Lake (ENG) | – | – | – | – | o | xo | o | o | o | xo | x– | xx | | 1.93 | |
| 3rd place, bronze medalist(s) | Nicola McDermott (AUS) | – | – | – | – | o | o | xo | o | o | xxx | | | | 1.91 | PB |
| 4 | Alyxandria Treasure (CAN) | – | – | – | o | o | o | xo | xo | xo | xxx | | | | 1.91 | |
| 5 | Priscilla Frederick (ANT) | – | – | o | o | o | xo | xo | xxx | | | | | | 1.87 | SB |
| 6 | Cassie Purdon (AUS) | – | – | – | o | o | o | xxx | | | | | | | 1.84 | |
| 7 | Nikki Manson (SCO) | – | – | – | o | xo | xo | xxx | | | | | | | 1.84 | |
| 8 | Bethan Partridge (ENG) | – | – | – | o | o | xxo | xxx | | | | | | | 1.84 | |
| 9 | Jeanelle Scheper (LCA) | – | – | – | o | o | xxx | | | | | | | | 1.80 | |
| 10 | Doreen Amata (NGR) | – | – | – | o | xxo | xxr | | | | | | | | 1.80 | |
| 10 | Sommer Lecky (NIR) | – | – | o | o | xxo | xxx | | | | | | | | 1.80 | |
| 12 | Natrena Hooper (GUY) | – | xo | o | o | xxx | | | | | | | | | 1.75 | |
| 13 | Erika Seyama (SWZ) | – | o | o | xxx | | | | | | | | | | 1.70 | |
| – | Shawntell Lockington (FIJ) | xxx | | | | | | | | | | | | | NM | |
