= Athletics at the 2003 Pan American Games – Men's pole vault =

Men's pole vault at the Pan American Games

The Men's Pole Vault event at the 2003 Pan American Games took place on Friday August 8, 2003. Bronze medalist Dominic Johnson won the only medal for Saint Lucia at the 2003 Pan American Games.

== Medalists ==
Gold	Toby Stevenson; United States
Silver	Russ Buller; United States
Bronze	Dominic Johnson; Saint Lucia

== Records ==
World Record	Sergey Bubka (UKR)	6.14 m	July 31, 1994	Sestriere, Italy
Pan Am Record	Pat Manson (USA)	5.75 m	March 18, 1995	Mar del Plata, Argentina

== Results ==
Rank	Athlete	Pole Vault							Final
Rank	Athlete	1	2	3	4	5	6	7	Result
1	Toby Stevenson (USA)	5.40-O	5.50-XXX	5.50-X	5.45-X	5.40-O	5.45-O		5.45 m
2	Russ Buller (USA)	5.40-O	5.50-XXX	5.50-X	5.45-X	5.40-O	5.45-X		5.40 m
3	Dominic Johnson (LCA)	5.20-O	5.35-XO	5.40-XXO	5.50-XXX				5.40 m
4	Javier Benítez (ARG)	4.90-XO	5.00-O	5.10-XO	5.20-XO	5.30-XXO	5.35-0	5.40-XXX	5.35 m
5	Giovanni Lanaro (MEX)	5.20-O	5.30-O	5.40-XXX					5.30 m
6	Ricardo Diez (VEN)	5.00-XO	5.10-O	5.20-XXO	5.30-XXX				5.20 m
7	José Francisco Nava (CHI)	4.80-XXO	5.00-XO	5.10-XO	5.20-XXO	5.30-XXX			5.20 m
8	Jabari Ennis (JAM)	4.90-O	5.00-O	5.10-XXX					5.00 m
9	Francisco León (PER)	4.90-XO	5.10-XXX						4.90 m
10	Jorge Naranjo (CHI)	4.80-XO	5.00-XXX						4.80 m
—	Róbison Pratt (MEX)	5.30-XXX							NM

== See also ==
- 2003 World Championships in Athletics – Men's pole vault
- Athletics at the 2004 Summer Olympics – Men's pole vault
