= Saint Lucia at the 2022 World Athletics Championships =

- Flag of Saint Lucia
- WA code: LCA

in Eugene, United States 15 July 2022 – 24 July 2022
- Competitors: 1 (1 woman)
- Medals: Gold 0 Silver 0 Bronze 0 Total 0

World Athletics Championships appearances (overview)
- 1983; 1987; 1991; 1993; 1995; 1997; 1999; 2001; 2003; 2005; 2007; 2009; 2011; 2013; 2015; 2017; 2019; 2022; 2023; 2025

Saint Lucia competed at the 2022 World Athletics Championships in Eugene, Oregon, United States, which were held from 15 to 24 July 2022. The athlete delegation of the country was composed of one competitor, sprinter Julien Alfred. She qualified for the World Championships upon reaching the qualification standard for the women's 100 metres. In the event, she reached the semifinals before being disqualified during the race.

== Background ==
The 2022 World Athletics Championships in Eugene, Oregon, United States, were held from 15 to 24 July 2022. To qualify for the World Championships, athletes had to reach an entry standard (e.g. time and distance), place in a specific position at select competitions, be a wild card entry, or qualify through their World Athletics Ranking at the end of the qualification period.

Only one athlete qualified to compete for Saint Lucia at the 2022 World Championships, sprinter Julien Alfred. She qualified upon reaching the qualifying standard of the women's 100 metres after recording 11.07 seconds at a race in Texas. This was Alfred's first appearance for Saint Lucia at the World Athletics Championships. Her season's best was 10.81 seconds in the distance.

== Results ==
Key

- Q = Qualified for the next round
- q = Qualified for the next round as a fastest loser or, in field events, by position without achieving the qualifying target
- NR = National record
- PB = Personal best
- SB = Season best
- N/A = Round not applicable for the event

=== Women ===
Alfred competed in the qualifying heats of the women's 100 metres on 16 July 2022 in the fifth heat against six other competitors. There, she recorded a time of 11.05 seconds and placed second, advancing further to the semifinals held the next day as she was within the top three of her heat. She then competed in the first semifinal against seven other competitors. There, she was disqualified and thus did not advance to the finals.

Track and road events

| Athlete | Event | Heat | | Semi-final | | Final | |
| Athlete | Event | Result | Rank | Result | Rank | Result | Rank |
|---|---|---|---|---|---|---|---|
| Julien Alfred | 100 metres | 11.05 Q | 10 | DQ | | did not advance | |
