= Saint Lucia at the 2009 World Championships in Athletics =

- WA code: LCA

in Berlin
- Competitors: 1
- Medals: Gold 0 Silver 0 Bronze 0 Total 0

World Championships in Athletics appearances
- 1983; 1987; 1991; 1993; 1995; 1997; 1999; 2001; 2003; 2005; 2007; 2009; 2011; 2013; 2015; 2017; 2019; 2022; 2023; 2025

Saint Lucia competed at the 2009 World Championships in Athletics in Berlin, Germany, which were held from 15 to 23 August 2009. The athlete delegation consisted of one competitor, high jumper Levern Spencer. In the qualification round of the women's high jump, she recorded a height of 1.89 metres and placed equal 24th amongst all of the athletes, failing to advance to the finals.

== Background ==
The 2009 World Championships in Athletics were held at the Olympiastadion in Berlin, Germany. Under the auspices of the International Amateur Athletic Federation, this was the twelfth edition of the World Championships. It was held from 15 to 23 August 2009 and had 47 different events. Among the competing teams was Saint Lucia. For this edition of the World Championships in Athletics, high jumper Levern Spencer competed for the nation. Previously, she represented Saint Lucia at the 2005 World Championships in Athletics and the 2007 World Championships in Athletics in the same event.

== Results ==
=== Women ===
Spencer competed in the qualification round of the women's high jump on 18 August 2009 in Group A against sixteen other high jumpers. There, she decided to skip her first attempt at 1.80 metres and instead went up to 1.85 metres, being successful on her first attempt. She then went up to 1.89 metres, failing her first two attempts then finally being successful on her third. She then went up to 1.92 metres, failing all of her attempts and placed 13 in her qualification group and 24th overall, failing to advance to the finals of the event.

Event	Athletes	Qualification		Final	
Event	Athletes	Result	Rank	Result	Rank
High jump	Levern Spencer	1.89	24	Did not advance	
