= Sandisha Antoine =

Saint Lucian triple jumper

Personal information
- Born: 5 November 1991 (age 34)

Sport
- Sport: Track and field
Medal record
Representing Saint Lucia
CARIFTA Games
Gold medal – first place	2009 Vieux Fort	Triple jump
Gold medal – first place	2010 George Town	Triple jump

Sandisha Antoine (born 5 November 1991) is a retired Saint Lucian long jumper and triple jumper.

== Personal life ==
Antoine resided in Martinique since 2001, joined the club ASCOIA in 2004 and mostly competed out of Fort-de-France. After the 2019 season, when she found herself at a crossroads in her career, she chose to relocate to Jamaica for a final push towards Olympic qualification. Soon after moving in 2020, she was affected by the COVID-19 pandemic, which in Jamaica entailed a lockdown on universities, a ban on non-"essential" activities such as athletics training, and at times even a curfew from 8 PM to 6 AM.

== Triple jump ==
In age-specific categories, she competed at the 2007 World Youth Championships, finished fourth at the 2008 Commonwealth Youth Games, fourth at the 2009 Pan American Junior Championships, and won the gold medals at both the 2009 and 2010 CARIFTA Games. She became the first Saint Lucian to win back-to-back titles at the CARIFTA Games.

In senior competitions, she finished sixth at the 2013 Jeux de la Francophonie, seventh at the 2015 NACAC Championships, fifth at the 2018 Central American and Caribbean Games, twelfth at the 2019 Pan American Games and ninth at the 2022 Commonwealth Games.

Her result at the 2018 Central American and Caribbean Games was 13.91 metres, which was both per lifetime best as well as the Saint Lucian national record. Her performance in 2019, however, was marred by pain in her achilles tendon, and she failed qualification for the 2019 World Championships. Her goal for the 2020s was to reach 14.32 metres, which was the qualification standard for the 2020 Summer Olympics. She was given another chance as the Olympics was postponed for one year, but she did not reach it.

== Long jump ==
In age-specific categories, she finished fifth at the 2009 CARIFTA Games, seventh at the 2009 Pan American Junior Championships and fifth at the 2012 NACAC Under-23 Championships.

In senior competitions, she finished seventh at the 2013 Jeux de la Francophonie, seventh at the 2015 NACAC Championships, sixth at the 2018 Central American and Caribbean Games.

Her lifetime best jump was 6.41 metres, achieved in January 2019 in Fort-de-France.
