= Toby Stevenson (pole vaulter) =

American pole vaulter (born 1976)

Personal information
- Born: November 19, 1976 (age 49) Odessa, Texas, U.S.
Medal record
Men's Athletics
Representing the United States
Olympic Games
Silver medal – second place	2004 Athens	Pole Vault
Pan American Games
Gold medal – first place	2003 Santo Domingo	Pole Vault

Toby "Crash" Stevenson (born November 19, 1976) is an Olympic class pole vaulter from the United States. He is known for being the only pole vaulter in the international elite to wear a helmet during jumps.

== Biography ==
While attending Permian High School, Stevenson set 24 high school records, taking three district championships, and winning the state title in 1995, when he was also the top-ranked 18-year-old pole vaulter in the world. Stevenson later went on to graduate from Stanford University. He currently coaches pole vault and multi-event athletes, at the University of Washington. Among the athletes he has coached is 2016 Olympic Champion Ekaterini Stefanidi.

Since the fall of 2002, Stevenson has been a resident athlete at the U.S. Olympic Training Center in Chula Vista, California. He won the 2004 Olympic silver medal in pole vaulting, the 2003 Pan American Games gold medal, and the 2004 USA Indoor gold medal.

He is known for his emotional antics after a successful vault. He played his pole like a guitar after his silver medal vault.

On Friday, January 29, 2010, he officially retired from pole vaulting at the 2010 National Pole Vault Summit in Reno, NV.

From February, 2014, he is working as Head of Activity for Hammarby Athletics in Stockholm, Sweden.

After a four-year stint coaching at the University of Kentucky, where he coached Olivia Gruver to her second straight NCAA outdoor title, as well as coaching decathlete Tim Duckworth to both the NCAA decathlon and heptathlon crowns, Stevenson was named associate head track & field coach in charge of the jumps and multi-events at the University of Washington on July 11, 2018.

== See also ==
- 6 metres club
