= Zepherinus Joseph =

Zepherinus Joseph (born 13 August 1975, in Mon Repos, Saint Lucia) is a Saint Lucian athlete, specialising in middle and long distance events. Zepherinus holds the Saint Lucia National Records for every outdoor track and road event from the 1500m to the marathon.

Better known as Knockay or Straws, Zepherinus attended Micoud Secondary School before taking up athletics scholarships at Central Arizona College and University of North Florida, where he studied Building Construction. He was a member of Creation Sports Club in Saint Lucia.

Before leaving for Central Arizona College in 1998, Zepherinus had already established himself as the best distance runner St Lucia had ever produced. By the time he got to Arizona on a scholarship sourced by Saint Lucia Pole Vault record-holder Dominic Johnson, "Knockay" was St Lucia's national champion at 1500m and 5000m, and he held the national records at both distances. In 1998, he completed the 1500m in 3:57.33 at the Central American and Caribbean Games in Maracaibo, Venezuela.

== Central Arizona ==
It did not take long to make a mark on CAC. Zepherinus came second at the National Junior College Athletics Association (NJCAA) cross-country championships in his first year, his 24:21 a new school record. He won the regional college cross-country championships and came second in his conference, clocking a little over 25 minutes each time.

Zepherinus also became a father in 1999, a year in which he also achieved his greatest athletic feat up to that point in his career. In January, he placed fifth in the Central American and Caribbean Cross Country Championships, the best individual finish ever for a St. Lucian.

Zepherinus started the 2000 season with a 10,000m win in March, in Phoenix Arizona, in 31 minutes 27 seconds. Days later, he won the 1,500m run at Arizona State University in 3:55, equalling his personal, national, and course record in the event. In May, he went on to win the NJCAA 10K title in 31 minutes 25 seconds in Illinois.

== North Florida ==
Upon graduating from CAC, Zepherinus transferred to the University of North Florida. In 2001, his junior year, he ran the 10K in a new national-record time of 29:48.97 in a meet at Tallahassee, Florida. his time was also a new event record for the nine-member Organisation of Eastern Caribbean States (OECS).

Also in 2001, representing St Lucia, Zepherinus lowered his national record for the men's 5000m run at the Fourth Francophonie Games in Ottawa-Hull, Canada. Zepherinus was ninth. Athletes from Morocco took all three medals. Zepherinus' time of 14:25.20 lowered his months-old from the Penn Relays (14:37.77), itself a five-second reduction from his then two-year-old mark. At Francophonie, Zepherinus was also seventh in the 1500m, running 3:52.36.

In 2002, Zepherinus was hit by a car whilst on a morning run, but he determined to recover fully and come back stronger than ever. He placed second in the 5,000 (14:34.25) and the 10,000 (31:12.82) at the NCAA Division II Outdoor Track Championships in San Angelo, Texas. But it was in the cross country season that he really came alive, setting course records and winning every race he competed in up to the NCAA Division II South Region Championship. The NCAA Division II Cross-Country Coaches Association named him Division II Cross Country Co-Athlete of the Year, along with Ashland University's Nick Cordis. Zepherinus was the first UNF Osprey to claim that title.

Unfortunately, the boy from the tropics found it hard going in cold, windy, mushy conditions at the 2002 NCAA Division II National Cross-Country Championships at Ashland University in Ohio. His time of 30:51.0 earned him a fairly close third, within 10 seconds of the champion, Alfred Rugema (30:43.7) of Abilene Christian University. Cordes (30:46.5) was second.

In December 2002, Zepherinus made the Sports Illustrated "Faces in the Crowd" page.

== Professional career ==
In November 2003, Zepherinus won his first OECS NEMWIL Half Marathon title in Basseterre, St Kitts-Nevis. Reigning champion Pamenos Ballantyne of St Vincent & the Grenadines was absent in controversial circumstances, but Zepherinus' 1:12:10.18 win came against a quality field comprising the region's best distance runners, and he beat Trinidad & Tobago's Curtis Cox by less than 14 seconds.

That year he had also qualified for the men's Marathon at the 2004 Athlens Olympics after running the Twin Cities Marathon in Minnesota. He completed the race in 2:44:19, finishing 80th. Zepherinus was the Saint Lucian flagbearer at the opening ceremony of the 28th Olympiad. by a quirk of the Greek alphabet, Saint Lucia was first into the stadium, and so Zepherinus had the honour of leading the opening procession. Upon his return to Saint Lucia, the community of Mon Repos renamed of Coolie Town Road to Knockay Avenue in recognition of his accomplishments.

In 2005, Zepherinus took his second OECS title in Antigua-Barbuda in 1:10:15. He won again in 2006 in the Commonwealth of Dominica, in 1:08:33.7. That earned him his first Sportsman of the Year title in Saint Lucia. Zepherinus won OECS in St Kitts-Nevis again in 2007, this time in 1:13:22. He won on home soil in 2008 in 1:7:44.14, still his best-ever time in the OECS event. In 2009, he made it five on the trot, winning in St Vincent & the Grenadines in 1.14.13.

In February 2010, Zepherinus was named Saint Lucia's 2009 Sportsman of the Year, the second time he had taken that title.

== Outdoor records ==
Event	Record	Date	Meet	Place	Ref
1500 m	3:48.50	31 March 2001		Gainesville, United States	
3000 m	8:36.41	10 April 1999		Tempe, United States	
5000 m	14:25.20	20 July 2001		Ottawa, Canada	
10000 m	29:48.97	23 March 2001		Tallahassee, United States	
Half marathon	1:04:52	28 November 2002		Jacksonville, United States	
Marathon	2:16:06	5 October 2003		Saint Paul, United States	

== Indoor records ==
Event	Record	Date	Meet	Place	Ref
3000 m	8:17.20	9 February 2003		Gainesville, United States	
5000 m	14:26.80	9 February 2002		Indianapolis, United States	

== Junior records ==
Event	Record	Date	Meet	Place	Ref
5000 m	15:19.12	10 July 1994		Port of Spain, Trinidad and Tobago	

Olympic Games
Preceded by Dominic Johnson	Flag bearer for Saint Lucia; Athens 2004	Succeeded by Lavern Spencer
