= Saint Lucia at the 1983 World Championships in Athletics =

- Flag of Saint Lucia
- WA code: LCA

in Helsinki, Finland August 7–14, 1983
- Competitors: 2 (1 man and 1 woman) in 4 events
- Medals: Gold 0 Silver 0 Bronze 0 Total 0

World Championships in Athletics appearances
- 1983; 1987; 1991; 1993; 1995; 1997; 1999; 2001; 2003; 2005; 2007; 2009; 2011; 2013; 2015; 2017; 2019; 2022; 2023; 2025

Saint Lucia competed at the 1983 World Championships in Athletics in Helsinki, Finland, which were held from 7 to 14 August 1983. The athlete delegation consisted of two athletes, sprinters John Albertie and Cornelia Baptiste. Albertie competed in the men's 100 metres and 200 metres, while Baptiste competed in the women's 200 metres and women's 400 metres. Neither of them earned a medal.

== Background ==
The 1983 World Championships in Athletics were held at the Helsinki Olympic Stadium in Helsinki, Finland. Under the auspices of the International Amateur Athletics Federation, this was the first edition of the World Championships. It was held from 7 to 14 August 1983 and had 41 different events. Among the competing nations was Saint Lucia. For this edition of the World Championships in Athletics, sprinters John Albertie and Cornelia Baptiste competed for the nation.

== Results ==
=== Men ===
Albertie first competed in the qualifying heats of the men's 100 metres on 7 August. He raced in the second heat against seven other athletes. There, he recorded a time of 10.90 seconds, placing seventh, and failed to advance to the quarterfinals. He then competed in the qualifying heats of the men's 200 metres on 12 August. He raced in the fourth heat against six other athletes. There, he recorded a time of 22.53 seconds, again placing seventh, and failed to advance to the quarterfinals.

Track and road events

Athlete	Event	Heat		Quarterfinal		Semifinal		Final	
Athlete	Event	Result	Rank	Result	Rank	Result	Rank	Result	Rank
John Albertie	100 metres	10.90	7	Did not advance					
John Albertie	200 metres	22.53	7	Did not advance					

=== Women ===
Baptiste first competed in the qualifying heats of the women's 400 metres on 7 August. She raced in the fourth heat against six other athletes. She recorded a time of 1:00.79, placing last, though qualified for the quarterfinals as her time was fast enough to do so. Though, she did not start in the quarterfinals held the following day. She then competed in the qualifying heats of the women's 200 metres held on 12 August. She raced in the third heat against seven other athletes. She recorded a wind-aided time of 26.29 seconds, placing last, and did not qualify for the quarterfinals.

Track and road events

Athlete	Event	Heat		Quarterfinal		Semifinal		Final	
Athlete	Event	Result	Rank	Result	Rank	Result	Rank	Result	Rank
Cornelia Baptiste	200 metres	26.29w	8	Did not advance					
Cornelia Baptiste	400 metres	1:00.79	7 q	DNS		Did not advance			
