= Jean-Luc Zephir =

Saint Lucian swimmer and Olympic athlete

Personal information
- Nationality: Saint Lucian
- Born: 23 March 1993 (age 33) Fort-de-France, Martinique

Sport
- Sport: Swimming
- Strokes: Freestyle

Jean-Luc Zephir (born 23 March 1993) is a Saint Lucian swimmer. Zephir represented his country at the 2020 Summer Olympics in the men's 100 metre freestyle event. He competed in the men's 100 metre freestyle event at the 2017 World Aquatics Championships. In 2019, Zephir was named to Saint Lucia's 2019 Pan American Games team.

In 2019, he represented Saint Lucia at the 2019 World Aquatics Championships held in Gwangju, South Korea and he competed in the men's 50 metre freestyle and men's 100 metre freestyle events. In both events he did not advance to compete in the semi-finals.

Olympic Games
Preceded by Lavern Spencer	Flag bearer for Saint Lucia; Tokyo 2020 with Lavern Spencer	Succeeded by Michael Joseph
