= Michelle Baptiste =

Saint Lucian long jumper

Personal information
- Born: 27 August 1977 (age 48) Castries, Saint Lucia

Sport
- Sport: Track and field
Medal record
Athletics
Representing Saint Lucia
CAC Junior Championships (U20)
| Silver medal – second place | 1996 San Salvador | Long jump |
CARIFTA Games Junior (U20)
| Gold medal – first place | 1995 George Town | Long jump |
| Bronze medal – third place | 1992 Nassau | 4x400m relay |
CARIFTA Games Youth (U17)
| Bronze medal – third place | 1992 Nassau | Long Jump |

Michelle Baptiste (born 27 August 1977) is a Saint Lucian long jumper. She was the first woman to represent Saint Lucia at the Olympics.

== Career ==
Baptiste was an All-American jumper for the Missouri State Lady Bears track and field team, finishing 7th in the long jump at the 1997 NCAA Division I Indoor Track and Field Championships.

She won the bronze medal at the 1999 Central American and Caribbean Championships. She also competed at the 1996 Olympic Games without reaching the final round.

Her personal best jump is 6.47 metres, achieved in May 1996 in Springfield.

== Achievements ==
| Year | Competition | Venue | Position | Event | Notes |
Representing Saint Lucia
| 1992 | CARIFTA Games (U-17) | Nassau, Bahamas | 3rd | Long jump | 5.50 m |
| 1992 | CARIFTA Games (U-20) | Nassau, Bahamas | 3rd | 4 × 400 m relay | 4:05.94 |
| 1995 | CARIFTA Games (U-20) | George Town, Cayman Islands | 7th | 100 m | 12.10 |
| 1995 | CARIFTA Games (U-20) | George Town, Cayman Islands | 1st | Long jump | 5.66 m |
| 1996 | Central American and Caribbean Junior Championships (U-20) | San Salvador, El Salvador | 4th | 100 m | 11.69 (0.7 m/s) |
| 1996 | Central American and Caribbean Junior Championships (U-20) | San Salvador, El Salvador | 2nd | Long jump | 5.99 m |
| 1996 | Olympic Games | Atlanta, United States | 46th (h) | 100 m | 11.92 (0.6 m/s) |
| 1996 | World Junior Championships | Sydney, Australia | 20th (qf) | 100m | 12.08 (wind: -1.3 m/s) |
| 1996 | World Junior Championships | Sydney, Australia | 22nd (q) | Long jump | 5.34 m (wind: +0.4 m/s) |
| 1999 | Central American and Caribbean Championships | Bridgetown, Barbados | 3rd | Long jump | 6.26 m |
| 1999 | Pan American Games | Winnipeg, Canada | 13th | Long jump | 5.92 m |

Olympic Games
| Preceded by First | Flag bearer for Saint Lucia; Atlanta 1996 | Succeeded by Dominic Johnson |
