= Darvin Edwards =

Saint Lucian high jumper

Personal information
- Nationality: Saint Lucian
- Born: 11 September 1986 (age 40) Castries, Saint Lucia
- Height: 1.85 m (6 ft 1 in)
- Weight: 86 kg (190 lb)

Sport
- Sport: Track and field
- Event: High Jump
- Coached by: Gregory Lubin, Dane Magloire

Achievements and titles
- Personal best: 2.31m
Medal record
Men's athletics
Representing Saint Lucia
CAC Championships
Bronze medal – third place	2011 Mayagüez, Puerto Rico	High Jump
CARIFTA Games Junior (U20)
Gold medal – first place	2004 Hamilton, Bermuda	High Jump
Silver medal – second place	2005 Bacolet, Tobago	High Jump

Darvin Edwards (born 11 September 1986) is a Saint Lucian competitor in men's High Jump. Darvin was born in Castries.

Darvin holds the St Lucia National Record for men's High Jump. His career best mark of 2.31m, in Daegu, South Korea at the 2011 IAAF World Championships in Athletics is also the record for the Organisation of Eastern Caribbean States.

== Biography ==
=== Early years ===
Darvin attended St Aloysius RC Boys School and then Entrepot Secondary School in Castries. At the latter institution, he was introduced to the High Jump event by coach Gregory Lubin. In 2004, Darvin won the under-20 men’s High Jump at the CARIFTA Games in Hamilton, Bermuda, clearing 2.06m on the opening day. In 2005, the Games were held at the Dwight Yorke Stadium, in Bacolet, Tobago. Darvin had reset the St Lucia National Junior Record at 2.15m a little over a week before the meet. But in the event, he had to settle for joint second, with a best height of 2.05m.

=== Belgrave Harriers ===
In 2006, Darvin was selected to represent Saint Lucia at the Commonwealth Games in Melbourne, Australia. He cleared 2.10m and finished seventh in his qualifying group and 13th overall, just missing out on a spot in the final through count back. That year, he opted to travel to London, England, to join the Belgrave Harriers club. There, he was introduced to coach Trevor Llewellyn, who set about totally rebuilding his technique. In the Golden Jubilee Cup Semi-Final, at Eton, Darvin cleared 2.20m on his first trial at that height, setting the Saint Lucia National Record for his event, still shy of his 20th birthday. In the Golden Jubilee Cup Final, Darvin cleared 2.15m to finish third.

Darvin was also introduced to indoor competition during his time in England. In January 2008, competing for Belgrave at Brunel University in Uxbridge, West London, Darvin cleared a career-best (indoors and out) of 2.25m to beat teammate Samson Oni into second place. At the time, Oni co-owned the club's indoor record at 2.27m.

Darvin was called into international action in 2008, for the North American Central American and Caribbean (NACAC) Under-23 Championships in Toluca, Mexico. Darvin established a new career-best outdoors mark of 2.23m to take silver. Jamaal Wilson of The Bahamas, who had beaten Darvin at CARIFTA in 2005, also cleared 2.23 but on this occasion had to settle for bronze. [2]

=== Injury and Return ===
After a solid start to 2009, which included clearing 2.22m to win the Aviva Great Britain and United Kingdom Indoor Trials, Darvin suffered a major setback through back injury that kept him out of competition throughout the 2010 season. But when he did come back in 2011, he was entirely back on track, jumping better than ever before.

Darvin began the year clearing a relatively modest 2.20m in indoors competition, winning the South of England AA Championships at Lee Valley. In May, Darvin won his first outdoor competition in the London district of Battersea with a height of 2.27m, breaking the 21-year-old All-Division Southern League Record and clearing his best height indoor or out since 2008, a new National Record.

Just about a month later, in the British Athletics League Division 1 at Barnet Copthall, Darvin went a centimetre further, clearing 2.28m and qualifying to represent Saint Lucia at the IAAF World Championships in Athletics and the Games of the XXX Olympiad in London, England. The height also represented a new Organisation of Eastern Caribbean States record.

=== World Championships ===
At the 2011 IAAF World Championships in Athletics, in the South Korean city of Daegu, he was the first man in Group A to clear 2.31m, automatically qualifying for the final, attaining the A standard for the 2012 Olympics and setting a new National Record and OECS Record.

=== 2012 Summer Olympics ===
Edwards competed at the 2012 Summer Olympics but failed to qualify for the finals.

== Honours ==
Place	Competition		Height	Venue	Date
13th	IAAF World Championships in Athletics	12 f	2.20m	Daegu, South Korea	01/09/2011
18th	Commonwealth Games	7 q	2.10m	Melbourne, Australia	20/03/2006

== Outdoor Progression ==
Year	Height	Location	Date
2011	2.31m	Daegu, South Korea	30/08/2011
2010	2.15m		
2009	2.22m i	Sheffield, England	13/02/2009
2008	2.25m i	Uxbridge, England	27/01/2008
2007	2.21m	Bedford, England	10/06/2007
2006	2.20m	London, England	12/08/2006
2005	2.15m	Windsor, Canada	30/07/2005
2004	2.06m		
