= Albert Reynolds (athlete) =

Saint Lucian javelin thrower

Personal information
- Born: 28 March 1988 (age 38) Castries, Saint Lucia

Sport
- Sport: Track and field
Medal record
Representing Saint Lucia
Pan American Games
Bronze medal – third place	2019 Lima	Javelin throw
NACAC Championships
Bronze medal – third place	2015 San Jose	Javelin throw

Albert Reynolds (born 28 March 1988) is a Saint Lucian javelin thrower. Reynolds was born in Castries, and grew up in Babonneau.

Reynolds holds the Saint Lucia national record and Organisation of Eastern Caribbean States record for men's javelin throw, throwing 77.71 m (254 ft 11 1/4 in) at the 2015 NACAC Championships in Athletics in San Jose, Costa Rica, winning the bronze medal. He is the first Saint Lucian to hold the OECS record for Javelin Throw.

Reynolds attended Babonneau Secondary School and was Saint Lucia's high school champion. He went on to win gold at the 2007 CARIFTA Games.

At the senior level, Reynolds has represented Saint Lucia at the Commonwealth Games, Central American and Caribbean Games, Central American and Caribbean Championships, Pan American Sports Festival, Organisation of Eastern Caribbean States Championships, and North and Central American and Caribbean Championships. He has won medals at the OECS Championships and NACAC Championships.

In 2013 and 2014, Reynolds was named Senior Athlete Of The Year by the Saint Lucia Athletics Association.

Since 2015, Reynolds has trained under Roger Gravenois of Club Asco Inter Atlas in the French overseas department of Martinique.

At the 2019 World Athletics Championships, Reynolds finished 29th.

== Record ==
Year	Performance	Date	Meet	Place	Ref
2015	77.71 m	9 August	NACAC Championships	San José, Costa Rica	
2014	69.10 m	1 August	Commonwealth Games	Glasgow, Scotland	
2013	72.06 m	17 February	Independence Championship	Vieux Fort, Saint Lucia	
2012	72.86 m	19 February	Independence Championship	Vieux Fort, Saint Lucia	
2010	69.52m	25 July		Mayagüez, Puerto Rico	
2007	69.13 m	8 July		São Paulo, Brazil	
