= Ron Promesse =

Saint Lucian athlete

Personal information
- Born: 31 August 1974 (age 51)

Sport
- Sport: Track and field

Ronald Promesse (born 31 August 1974) is an athlete from Saint Lucia.

Promesse was an All-American sprinter for the UTEP Miners track and field team, placing 5th in the 55 meters at the 1998 NCAA Division I Indoor Track and Field Championships.

He represented Saint Lucia at the 2000 Summer Olympics in the 100 metres race, but did not finish his heat and did not advance to the next round.
