= Makeba Alcide =

Saint Lucian athlete

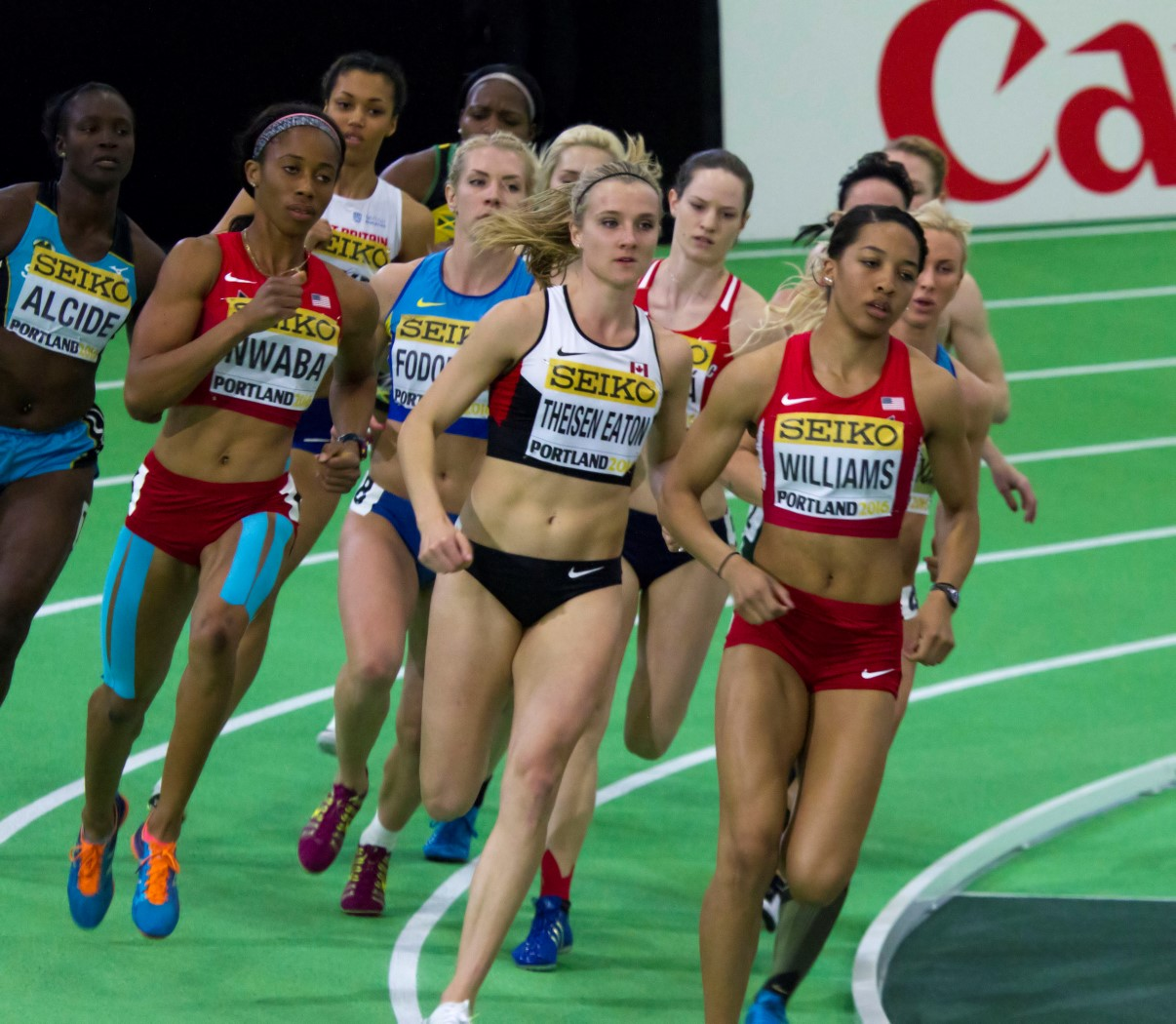
- Alcide (far left) at the 2016 IAAF World Indoor Championships

Personal information
- Nationality: Saint Lucian
- Born: 24 February 1990 (age 36) Castries, Saint Lucia
- Height: 175 cm (5 ft 9 in)
- Weight: 67.0 kg (148 lb)

Sport
- Sport: Track and field
- Events: Heptathlon and Pentathlon
- Club: University of Arkansas Razorbacks

Achievements and titles
- Personal best: 6050 points
Medal record
Women's athletics
Representing Saint Lucia
NACAC U23 Championships
Bronze medal – third place	2010 Miramar	Heptathlon
Bronze medal – third place	2012 Irapuato	Heptathlon
CARIFTA Games Junior (U20)
Silver medal – second place	2009 Vieux Fort	Pentathlon

Makeba Alcide (born 24 February 1990 in Castries, Saint Lucia) is a Saint Lucian track and field athlete. She holds the Saint Lucia records and OECS records for women's 60m Hurdles, Pentathlon and Heptathlon, and the Saint Lucia record for 100m Hurdles.

== Biography ==
Makeba was born in Castries, Saint Lucia, to Andre Alcide and Agath Alphonse. An alumnus of St Joseph's Convent in Castries, she was one of the island's most outstanding junior female athletes. Competing in the under-20 Pentathlon at the CARIFTA Games between 2007 and 2009, she took silver in that event at the 2009 edition of the meet, on home soil in Vieux Fort, Saint Lucia. She set personal-best marks for 100-metre Hurdles, High Jump, Shot Put and the 800-metre run.

After a strong performance at the 2009 National Championships, Makeba was named to the Saint Lucia team for the Central American and Caribbean Athletics Championships in Havana, Cuba. She only completed three of the seven events in her first full international competition, and her first attempt at Heptathlon. Makeba was recruited to the University of Arkansas in 2009, enrolling in the Fulbright College of Arts and Sciences.

In January, 2010, at the Razorback Invitational, Makeba competed in her first collegiate Pentathlon at the Randal Tyson Track Center. She finished fifth in the event with 3,318 points, with marks of 9.16 seconds in the 60-metre Hurdles, 1.59 metres in the High Jump, 10.66 metres in the Shot Put (second overall), 4.87 metres in the Long Jump and 2:35.93 seconds in the 800-metre run. In her first collegiate Heptathlon, at the Southeastern Conference Championships in Knoxville, Tennessee, Makeba had personal bests in six of the seven events to post a sixth-place finish with 5,153 points, a National Record for Saint Lucia. She was third in the Shot Put with a toss of 11.66m, fourth in the high jump with a clearance of 1.66m and sixth in the 800 metres.

Makeba was named to the Saint Lucia team for the North American, Central American and Caribbean (NACAC) Under-23 Championships in Miramar, Florida in 2010. She finished third with a personal-best total of 5,172 points. She set personal bests in the 200-metres (25.37), 800-metre run (2:20.24) and Javelin Throw (37.37m) in which she placed first. In her second year at Arkansas, Makeba won the Pentathlon at the Razorback Invitational with 3,887 points. At the SEC Championships, she was fourth with 3,959. Her personal bests at the conference meet including High Jump and Shot Put. She finished 13th at the National Collegiate Athletics Association (NCAA) Indoor Championships with 3,919 points and a personal best time of 2:20.62 in the 800-metre run, and was named an All-American for the first time.

Outdoors, Makeba was fourth in Heptathlon at the 84th Clyde Littlefield Texas Relays, but thanks to an illegal wind during her opening event, the 100m Hurdles, her personal-best 5,543 points would not stand as a new National Record. In May, however, at the Southeastern Conference Outdoor Track & Field Championships on the campus of University of Georgia at the Spec Towns Track in Athens, Makeba matched or exceeded her career-best marks in five of seven events as she went on to take her first SEC title.

Her total of 5,646 points at the SEC Championships surpassed her prior National Record of 5,153, and established a new Heptathlon benchmark for the Organisation of Eastern Caribbean States. The OECS standard had theretofore been 5178 points, posted by Grenada's Colleen Felix in 2009. The fourth-best mark all-time in Arkansas history, Makeba's total also set a new Heptathlon record for the Specs Town Track. At the 2011 NCAA Championships, Makeba ended 14th with a total of 5,245 points, good for her second All-America selection of year. She also had an outstanding year academically, and was named not only to the SEC Spring Academic Honor Roll but also to the US Track & Field and Cross Country Coaches Association (USTFCCCA) All-Academic Team.

On her 22nd birthday, Makeba captured her first Southeastern Conference title in Pentathlon at the University of Kentucky's E.J. Nutter Field House. She compiled a new personal-best score of 4,126, the first time in her career she had eclipsed 4,000 points. Due to the oversized track at that facility, the mark would not be recognised as a National Record. Makeba was named an All-American during the NCAA Indoor Championships and Outdoor Championships in 2012. She would go on to win a silver medal at the NACAC Under-23 Championships in Mexico, running her best time ever for 100m Hurdles.

Makeba started the 2013 season with a flurry of personal records, and the school, National and OECS records for Pentathlon, 4464, more than 300 points better than the previous record of 4141, and her previous personal best of 4126. It was the sixth best Pentathlon performance in NCAA history. During that competition, she also set the school record for High Jump at 1.89m, the National and OECS Records for 60m Hurdles at 8.45m, and had career-best marks in four out of the five events.

As the season wore on, however, Makeba set her sights higher still. She became the collegiate record holder in the indoor Pentathlon with a score of 4,569. She set career-bests in three of the five components of the pentathlon (6.15m in the Long Jump; 8.35 in the 60 metre Hurdles; 2:16.37 in the 800 metre run) and an indoor PR in the Shot Put at 12.32m en route to a score that surpassed two-time NCAA pentathlon champ Brianne Theisen of Oregon's previous mark of 4,555. She would take silver at NCAA Indoors.

During the outdoor season, Makeba set a new National Record in the Heptathlon and won her fourth SEC title. She qualified for the 2014 World Championships in Athletics in Moscow, Russia, the first combined events athlete from Saint Lucia to qualify for global competition. She attained an A standard at the NCAA Championships, amassing 6,050 points. On that occasion, she again took silver.

In recognition of her work away from the track and outreach efforts on campus and in the community, Makeba was named to the 2013 SEC Community Service Team. She was a participant in Arkansas' Reading with the Razorbacks and Sweat Hawgs outreach programs to local elementary schools and was involved in Komen Foundation promotion during Chile Pepper Festival. She helped with donating efforts during Harp's Canned Food Drive and collecting shampoo and soap for 7Hills Homeless Center in Fayetteville.

At the Hogspy Awards in April, Alcide was named Arkansas' Female Student-Athlete of the Year. She was named the US Reack and Field and Cross Country Coaches Association SEC Field Athlete of the Year. The awards kept coming, as she was adjudged Saint Lucia's Sportswoman of the Year for 2013. The announcement was made at the country's National Sports Awards, which fell on Makeba's 24th birthday.

== Best Performances ==
Event	Performance	Wind	Location	Date
Pentathlon ind	4464		Fayetteville, Arkansas, United States	2013-01-25
Heptathlon	6050		Eugene, Oregon, United States	2013-06-07
200 Metres	24.31	0.6	Columbia, Missouri, United States	2012-06-07
800 Metres	2:12.05		Eugene, Oregon, United States	2013-06-07
800 Metres ind	2:14.05		Fayetteville, Arkansas, United States	2013-03-09
100 Metres Hurdles	13.52	1.0	Eugene, Oregon, United States	2013-06-06
60 Metres Hurdles ind	8.45		Fayetteville, Arkansas, United States	2013-01-25
High Jump	1.89 ind		Fayetteville, Arkansas, United States	2013-01-25
Long Jump	6.05	2.0	Eugene, Oregon, United States	2013-06-07
Long Jump ind	6.15		Fayetteville, Arkansas, United States	2013-02-22
Shot Put	12.89		Fayetteville, Arkansas, United States	2012-06-07
Javelin Throw	37.37		Miramar, Florida, United States	2010-07-11

== Outdoor Progression ==
Year	Points Total	Location	Date
2013	6050	Eugene, Oregon, United States	7 June 2013
2012	5621	Des Moines, Iowa, United States	26 April 2012
2011	5646	Athens, Georgia, United States	13 May 2011
2010	5172	Miramar, Florida, United States	11 July 2010
