= Erma-Gene Evans =

Saint Lucian javelin thrower

Personal information
- Born: 25 January 1984 (age 42) Castries, Saint Lucia

Sport
- Sport: Track and field
Medal record
Athletics
Representing Saint Lucia
CARIFTA Games Junior (U20)
Silver medal – second place	2003 Port of Spain	Javelin throw
Silver medal – second place	2002 Nassau	Javelin throw
Bronze medal – third place	2001 Bridgetown	Javelin throw

Erma-Gene Evans (born 25 January 1984) is a Saint Lucian javelin thrower.

Erma-Gene holds the Saint Lucia national records for women's javelin throw. She attended Leon Hess Comprehensive Secondary School (same school as attended by Julien Alfred) and Sir Arthur Lewis Community College in Castries, before pursuing undergraduate studies in marketing at the University of Texas-El Paso.

Erma-Gene was a CARIFTA Games bronze medallist in 2001, then a silver medallist in 2002 and 2003, her last year as a junior. But competing at the Pan American Junior Track & Field Championships that year in Bridgetown, Barbados, she set a meet record and national record of 49.67 m (163 ft 0 in) to take gold. For that feat, she was named 2003 junior and senior female Athlete of the Year in St. Lucia as well as the junior and senior Sportswoman of the Year.

In 2004, Erma-Gene took up studies at UTEP, and began training with coach Mika Laaksonen. She was third in the javelin at the 2004 North America, Central America and Caribbean Athletic Championships on 30 July, throwing 48.86 m (160 ft 4 in). In 2005, her mark of 52.27 m (171 ft 6 in) was the top throw in her flight during the qualifying round of the NCAA Championships, but she was unable to compete in the final due to injury. She was a runner-up at the NCAA Midwest Regional, and at the WAC Championships. She reset the Saint Lucia national record winning the Spira Invitational with a season-best of 52.68 m (172 ft 10 in) on 16 April 2016 and was named the WAC Athlete of the Week. She has previously broken the national record with a mark of 52.64 m (172 ft 8 in) to take fourth at the Texas Relays on 9 April.

Her form improved in 2006, when she gained All-America honors, taking sixth at the NCAA Championships with a throw of 51.45 m (168 ft 10 in), having earlier that season won the C-USA Championship with a national record toss of 55.00 m (180 ft 5 in), a distance that ranked second in school history. She finished seventh at the 2006 Central American and Caribbean Games. She was also fourth at NACAC that season.

Her senior year at UTEP was eventful. Erma-Gene won the C-USA Conference title with a new national record of 56.45 m (185 ft 2 in), qualifying her for the 2008 Olympic Games in Beijing, China. At the 2007 NCAA Championships she finished second.

Leading up to the Olympics, Erma-Gene recorded her career-best throw of 57.22 m (187 ft 9 in) in March 2008 in El Paso. In Beijing she was 8th overall in qualifying.

== Progression ==
2009	52.03 m (170 ft 8 in)	El Paso, TX	11/04/2009
2008	57.22 m (187 ft 9 in)	El Paso, TX	29/03/2008
2007	56.45 m (185 ft 2 in)	Houston, TX	11/05/2007
2006	55.00 m (180 ft 5 in)	El Paso, TX	12/05/2006
2005	52.68 m (172 ft 10 in)	El Paso, TX	16/04/2005
2004	48.86 m (160 ft 4 in)	Sherbrooke	30/07/2004
2003	49.67 m (163 ft 0 in)	Bridgetown	20/07/2003
2002	44.26 m (145 ft 3 in)	Nassau	01/04/2002
2001	38.30 m (125 ft 8 in)	Bridgetown	16/04/2001
