= Michael Joseph (Saint Lucian sprinter) =

Saint Lucian athlete (born 2002)

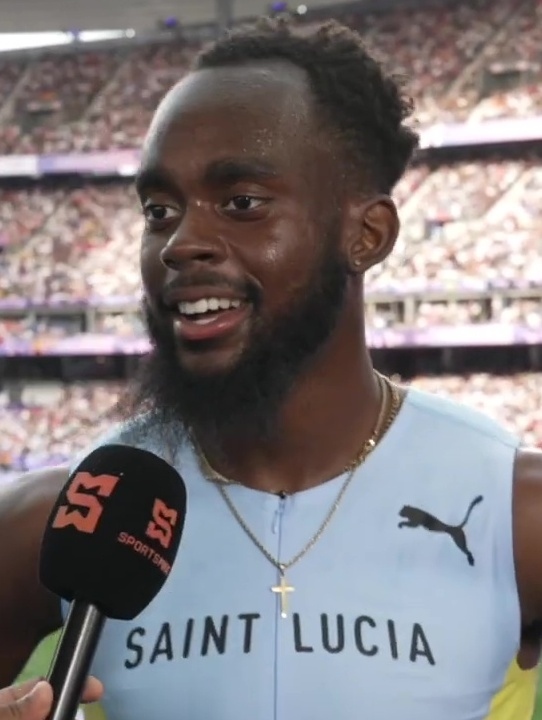

Personal information
- Born: 1 November 2002 (age 23) Castries, Saint Lucia

Sport
- Sport: Athletics
- Event: 400m

Achievements and titles
- Personal bests: 200m: 20.41 (Norman, 2023); 400m: 44.77 (Norman, 2023)
Medal record
Central American and Caribbean Games
Silver medal – second place	2023 San Salvador	200 m

Michael Joseph (born 1 November 2002) is a track and field athlete from Saint Lucia who competes as a sprinter, specializing in the men's 400m dash.

== Early life ==
From Gros Islet, on the island of Saint Lucia, he attended the Corinth Secondary School and was coached by Kenvin McPhee of Gros Islet Athletics Club before attending Kingston College in Jamaica. He then won a scholarship to the University of Kansas.

== Career ==
In 2021, at the inaugural Junior Pan Am Games in Cali-Valle, Colombia, he won his semi-final heat in the Men’s 400m, setting a new national junior record of 46.53, resetting by a hundredth of a second the mark established by Ivan Jean Marie in 1991.

In 2022, he was selected to compete at the 2022 Commonwealth Games in Birmingham. He was part of the Saint Lucian 4x100m relay team that qualified for the final and finished fifth.

In May 2023, competing for the Kansas Jayhawks at the Big 12 Championships in Norman, Oklahoma, he set new national record times of 20.41 for the 200 metres and 44.77 for the 400 metres.

In July 2023, at the Central American and Caribbean Games, he ran 44.90 for the 400 m, finishing second to Jereem Richards.

Competing at the 2023 World Athletics Championships in Budapest, he qualified for the 400m semi-final. He was the youngest athlete to qualify from the heats into the semi-finals.

He competed at the 2024 Summer Olympics over 400 metres in August 2024.

In July 2026, he was a semi-finalist in the 400 metres at the 2026 Commonwealth Games in Glasgow, Scotland.

Olympic Games
Preceded by Jean-Luc Zephir	Flag bearer for Saint Lucia; Paris 2024	Succeeded by Incumbent
