= Dominic Johnson (pole vaulter) =

Saint Lucian pole vaulter

Personal information
- Born: October 31, 1975 (age 50) Castries, Saint Lucia

Sport
- Sport: Track and field
Medal record
Representing Saint Lucia
Commonwealth Games
| Bronze medal – third place | 2002 Manchester | Pole vault |
Pan American Games
| Bronze medal – third place | 2003 Santo Domingo | Pole vault |
Central American and Caribbean Games
| Gold medal – first place | 2002 San Salvador | Pole vault |
| Silver medal – second place | 2006 Cartagena | Pole vault |

Dominic Laurence Johnson (born October 31, 1975) is a St Lucian retired athlete competing in the pole vault. Early in his career, he competed in the decathlon.

His personal best result is 5.70 metres, achieved in 2000. This is the current St Lucian record. He also holds the St Lucian records in decathlon, 110 metres hurdles, 4 x 100 metres relay and 4 x 400 metres relay. In 1998, Dominic established his national indoor record of 5.55 m in Flagstaff, Arizona. A graduate of University of Arizona, he has been described by then-coach Dave Murray as "the best all around athlete we've ever had at the university." Dominic, a past Sportsman of the Year recipient in St Lucia, won a silver medal for St Lucia at the 2008 CAC Championships in Cali, Colombia. In collaboration with journalist Terry Finisterre, Dominic also set up a College Athletic Scholarship Program, which benefitted more than 30 St. Lucian athletes, one of who went on to become a 2004 Olympian.

== Education ==
- Bachelor of Arts and Sciences in Anthropology, 1998
- University of Arizona, Tucson, Arizona
- Three time All-American in track and field
- Mary Roby Academic Achievement Award Recipient, multiple times
- Three Time NCAA All-American in pole vault and decathlon
- The Student Athlete Advisory Board for the University of Arizona
- Men's track and field team captain

== Competition record ==
| Year | Competition | Venue | Position | Event | Notes |
Representing Saint Lucia
| 1996 | Olympic Games | Atlanta, United States | 25th (h) | 4 × 400 m | 3:10.51 (NR) |
| 1996 | Olympic Games | Atlanta, United States | – | Pole vault | NM |
| 1998 | Central American and Caribbean Games | Maracaibo, Venezuela | 9th (sf) | 400 m | 47.85 |
| 1998 | Central American and Caribbean Games | Maracaibo, Venezuela | 7th | Pole vault | 4.80 m |
| 1998 | Central American and Caribbean Games | Maracaibo, Venezuela | 15th (q) | Long jump | 6.66 m |
| 1998 | Commonwealth Games | Kuala Lumpur, Malaysia | 8th | Decathlon | 7587 pts |
| 1999 | Central American and Caribbean Championships | Bridgetown, Barbados | 1st | Pole vault | 5.61 m |
| 1999 | Pan American Games | Winnipeg, Canada | 8th | 4 × 100 m | 40.56 s |
| 1999 | Pan American Games | Winnipeg, Canada | – | Pole vault | NM |
| 1999 | World Championships | Seville, Spain | 18th (q) | Pole vault | 5.55 m |
| 2000 | Olympic Games | Sydney, Australia | 26th (q) | Pole vault | 5.40 m |
| 2001 | Central American and Caribbean Championships | Guatemala City, Guatemala | 1st | Pole vault | 5.20 m |
| 2001 | World Championships | Edmonton, Canada | 15th (q) | Pole vault | 5.60 m |
| 2002 | Commonwealth Games | Manchester, United Kingdom | 3rd | Pole vault | 5.60 m |
| 2002 | Central American and Caribbean Games | San Salvador, El Salvador | 1st | Pole vault | 5.41 m |
| 2003 | Pan American Games | Santo Domingo, Dominican Republic | 3rd | Pole vault | 5.40 m |
| 2003 | World Championships | Paris, France | 25th (q) | Pole vault | 5.35 m |
| 2006 | Commonwealth Games | Melbourne, Australia | 5th | Pole vault | 5.35 m |
| 2006 | Central American and Caribbean Games | Cartagena, Colombia | 2nd | Pole vault | 5.20 m |
| 2007 | Pan American Games | Rio de Janeiro, Brazil | 4th | Pole vault | 4.90 m |
| 2008 | Central American and Caribbean Championships | Cali, Colombia | 2nd | Pole vault | 5.30 m |
| 2008 | Olympic Games | Beijing, China | 30th (q) | Pole vault | 5.30 m |

Olympic Games
| Preceded by Michelle Baptiste | Flag bearer for Saint Lucia; Sydney 2000 | Succeeded by Zepherinus Joseph |
