= Saint Lucia at the 2002 Commonwealth Games =

Sporting event delegation

Flag of Saint Lucia

Saint Lucia competed at Manchester in 2002 in their sixth Commonwealth Games. It was the most successful games for the nation, winning their first medal.

== Medals ==
	Gold	Silver	Bronze	Total
Saint Lucia	0	0	1	1

== Bronze ==
Athletics:

(bronze) Dominic Johnson Men's Pole Vault
