= Levern Spencer =

Saint Lucian high jumper and Olympic athlete

Hon. Levern Spencer SLC SLMM
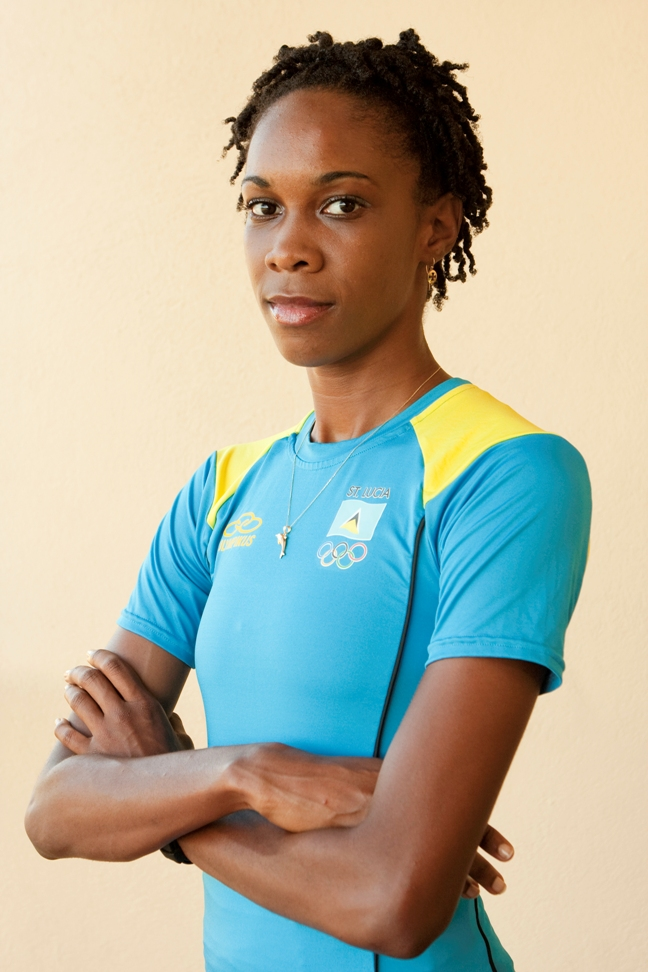
- Spencer in 2009

Personal information
- Full name: Levern Donaline Spencer
- Born: 23 June 1984 (age 42) Babonneau, Castries, Saint Lucia
- Height: 1.75 m (5 ft 9 in)
- Weight: 50 kg (110 lb)
- Website: LevernSpencer.lc/

Sport
- Country: Saint Lucia
- Sport: Athletics
- Event: High jump
- Coached by: Petros Kyprianou
- Retired: 31 October 2021
Medal record
Women's athletics
Representing Saint Lucia
Commonwealth Games
Gold medal – first place	2018 Gold Coast	High jump
Bronze medal – third place	2010 Delhi	High jump
Bronze medal – third place	2014 Glasgow	High jump
Pan American Games
Gold medal – first place	2015 Toronto	High jump
Gold medal – first place	2019 Lima	High jump
Bronze medal – third place	2007 Rio de Janeiro	High jump
Central American and Caribbean Games
Gold medal – first place	2010 Mayagüez	High jump
Gold medal – first place	2014 Veracruz	High jump
Gold medal – first place	2018 Barranquilla	High jump
Bronze medal – third place	2006 Cartagena	High jump
CAC Championships
Gold medal – first place	2001 Guatemala City	High jump
Gold medal – first place	2005 Nassau	High jump
Gold medal – first place	2008 Cali	High jump
Gold medal – first place	2009 Havana	High jump
Gold medal – first place	2011 Mayagüez	High jump
Gold medal – first place	2013 Morelia	High jump
World Youth Championships
Bronze medal – third place	2001 Debrecen	High jump
Representing Americas
Continental Cup
Bronze medal – third place	2010 Split	High jump
- Updated on 7 January 2015

Levern Donaline Spencer, SLC SLMM (born 23 June 1984) is a Saint Lucian retired athlete and high jumper. Spencer was a four-time Olympian for Saint Lucia and competed in eight World Championships. She was also a gold medalist at both the Commonwealth Games and Pan-American Games.

== Biography ==
=== Early career ===
Born in Castries, Spencer attended the University of Georgia in the United States. She earned a bachelor's degree from Georgia in Health Promotion and Behavior, having first embarked upon a course of study in computer science. She competed at several CARIFTA Games, bringing home gold in 2001. That same year, she earned the bronze medal at the World Youth Championships in Athletics in Debrecen, Hungary, jumping 1.81 m. Earlier in the season, she sailed over 1.84 m, a Saint Lucian national record.

In 2002, she won silver medal behind Jamaica's Shaunette Davidson at the CARIFTA Games. Later that year, she finished in eighth place at the World Junior Championships with 1.83 m, far from the winner, Croatia's Blanka Vlašić. At the end of the season, Spencer made her first appearance at the Commonwealth Games, ending in 12th place with a jump of 1.74 m.

In 2003, she bettered her national record and personal best, clearing 1.86 m twice. Still a junior athlete, she made the final at the Pan American Games and ended in fifth place. In 2004, she jumped 1.88 m.

2005 was a breakthrough year for Spencer. After turning 21, she won her first major title at the Central American and Caribbean Championships by clearing a new personal best and national record of 1.94 m. This result earned her a spot in the 2005 World Championships in Athletics. She was eliminated from competition in the qualifying round, only recording 1.84 m.

In 2006, she took gold at the NACAC Under-23 Championships and won bronze at the Central American and Caribbean Games. At the Commonwealth Games, she finished 5th. During the season, she only jumped 1.90 m in April.

==== First major final (2007) and first Olympic team (2008) ====
During the 2007 season, Spencer won the NACAC Championships and took bronze at the Pan American Games behind Mexico's Romary Rifka and Canada's Nicole Forrester. Competing at her second senior 2007 World Championships in Osaka, Spencer made the final by equalling her own national record of 1.94 m. She finished 15th with 1.90 m in the final.

In 2008, Spencer, Dominic Johnson and Erma Gene Evans were the only three athletes representing Saint Lucia at the 2008 Summer Olympics. She did not make the final, only managing 1.85 m for 27th. Earlier in the season, she won the 2008 Central American and Caribbean Championships with a jump of 1.91 m.

=== Professional career ===
In 2009, Spencer signed her first professional contract with Stellar Group, becoming the first high jumper on their roster. She repeated as Central American and Caribbean champion in Havana, Cuba and signed an endorsement deal with Caribbean telecommunications provider LIME. She was featured on the cover of the 2010 LIME Services Directory.

After taking the gold medal at the 2009 Central American and Caribbean Championships in Athletics, Spencer was the sole Saint Lucian to qualify for the IAAF World Championships in Athletics in Berlin, but she failed to make the final. She also narrowly missed out on making the cut for the season-ending 2009 IAAF World Athletics Final, finishing ninth in the world for women's high jump. On 18 July 2009, she achieved her best jump of 1.95 m in Zaragoza.

On 8 May 2010, in Athens, Georgia, she cleared 1.98 m to cruise to a victory with what was at the time the second-best jump in the world for the 2010 season. The jump is the Saint Lucia National Record and the record for the Caribbean Community. With this result of 1.98 m, Spencer was the leading women's high jumper in the Commonwealth. At the Commonwealth Games in New Delhi, however, she needed two attempts to clear 1.88m, and eventually recorded Saint Lucia's best-ever individual finish at Commonwealth Games athletics with a bronze medal, joining Dominic Johnson, who took bronze in men's Pole Vault in 2002 in Manchester. In 2010, Spencer recorded six of the top ten best jumps of her career. She scored a victory at the 2010 CAC Games with a jump of 1.94 m and also had success on the European circuit, scoring five straight victories in Finland to scoop the 2010 Finnish Elite Games jackpot.

In 2011, she failed to make the final at the 2011 World Championships in Daegu, missing by one spot. In the IAAF Diamond League, she finished second with 1.92 m behind two-time reigning world champion Blanka Vlašić. After the world championships, she won her fifth consecutive Central American and Caribbean Championships in Mayagüez but finished in 7th place at the 2011 Pan American Games.

In 2012, Spencer was awarded an Olympic Solidarity Scholarship and began training in Germany. She qualified for the 2012 Summer Olympics in London but did not make the final, finishing 19th with 1.90 m.

In 2013, Spencer won a sixth gold medal at the Central American and Caribbean Championships in Athletics, jumping 1.95 m, her highest jump since 2010. At the World Championships in Moscow, she qualified for her second major final, thanks to a 1.92 m jump. She finished 11th in the final.

In 2014, Spencer made the finals at the World Indoor Championships with a new national indoor record of 1.95 m in the qualifying rounds, before finishing 7th in the final. This was her best performance at a world championship. Then, she cleared 1.96 m, her best jump since 2010, before successfully defending her Central American and Caribbean Games title in Veracruz, Mexico. She won bronze at the Commonwealth Games in Glasgow with 1.88 m. behind Australian Eleanor Patterson (1.94 m) and English jumper Isobel Pooley (1.92 m). She placed fifth at the Continental Cup. She won gold at the Pan Games Festival in Mexico City, Mexico. She placed second at the Organisation of Eastern Caribbean States Championships, behind Jeannelle Scheper, who also beat her at Saint Lucia's National Championships.

=== First Olympic final (2016) ===
Spencer qualified for the 2015 World Championships in Athletics in Beijing, and the 2016 Summer Olympics in Rio de Janeiro by clearing 1.94 m at the Meeting Madrid in July. She won the Saint Lucia National Championship with a height of 1.90 m. Along with Jeannelle Scheper, Spencer represented Saint Lucia at the 2015 Pan American Games. She won gold with a best height of 1.94 m. It was Saint Lucia's first gold medal ever at the Pan Am Games; the country had been represented at these Games six times since 1985 and then claimed the NACAC Championships title in San José, Costa Rica. At the World Championships, she again qualified for the final but finished in 12th place with 1.88 m.

On 13 February 2016, Spencer equalled her own national indoor record in Hustopeče, with 1.95 m. A month later, at the 2016 IAAF World Indoor Championships, she placed sixth with 1.93 m, three centimeters away from the gold medal, won by American Vashti Cunningham. On 30 April, she jumped a World Lead (WL) of 1.95 m in Des Moines, Iowa, before attempting 2.00 m., where she failed on three attempts.

On 14 May, at the IAAF Diamond League tour in Shanghai, she earned a victory with a jump of 1.94 m, on countback ahead of Uzbekistan's Nadiya Dusanova. In late June, she won the national title with 1.94 m. She competed in the qualifying round of the women's high jump at the Olympics in August and became the first Saint-Lucian athlete to qualify for the final. She finished in 6th place. Back in Saint Lucia, the local population came to celebrate her performance. Two weeks after the Olympics, she jumped 1.96 m at the Meeting de Paris to place second behind Ruth Beitia. At the end of the season, she finishes second in the IAAF Diamond League tournament, behind Beitia again.

In the 2017 season, Spencer's best jump was 1.92 m. At the 2017 World Championships in London, she was the only Saint-Lucian athlete. She failed to enter into the final, finishing in 13th place in the qualifying round.

In 2018, she decided to compete in the indoor season. For her first outing, she cleared the Commonwealth Games standard with 1.90 m. On 27 January, she won the high jump competition in Hustopeče with 1.93 m, the third best result in the world. Three days later, she equaled her national indoor record from 2014 and 2016 in Třinec, jumping 1.95 m and claiming victory. She competed at the 2018 NACAC Championships, winning a third consecutive title at 1.91m.

== Retirement ==
After the Tokyo Olympics, Spencer announced her retirement from athletics on 31 October 2021 at the age of 37.

== Achievements ==
Year	Competition	Venue	Position	Notes
Representing Saint Lucia
1999	CARIFTA Games (U17)	Fort-de-France, Martinique	10th	1.55m
2000	CARIFTA Games (U-17)	St. George's, Grenada	3rd	1.73m
2000	Central American and Caribbean Junior Championships (U17)	San Juan, Puerto Rico	4th	1.67m
2001	CARIFTA Games (U-20)	Bridgetown, Barbados	1st	1.79m
2001	World Youth Championships	Debrecen, Hungary	3rd	1.81m
2001	Central American and Caribbean Championships	Guatemala City, Guatemala	1st	1.80m
2002	CARIFTA Games (U-20)	Nassau, Bahamas	2nd	1.82m
2002	Central American and Caribbean Junior Championships	Bridgetown, Barbados	1st	1.81m
2002	World Junior Championships	Kingston, Jamaica	8th	1.83 m
2002	Commonwealth Games	Manchester, United Kingdom	12th	1.74m
2003	CARIFTA Games (U-20)	Port of Spain, Trinidad and Tobago	7th (h)	100m: 12.46 s (0.0 m/s)
2003	CARIFTA Games (U-20)	Port of Spain, Trinidad and Tobago	2nd	1.86m CR
2003	Windward Islands Games	Grand Bay, Dominica	1st	100m: 12.3 (ht)
2003	Windward Islands Games	Grand Bay, Dominica	1st	1.84m
2003	Pan American Junior Athletics Championships	Bridgetown, Barbados	2nd	1.83m
2003	Pan American Games	Santo Domingo, Dominican Republic	5th	1.83m
2004	NACAC Under-23 Championships	Sherbrooke, Canada	2nd	1.85m
2005	Central American and Caribbean Championships	Nassau, Bahamas	1st	1.94m
2005	World Championships	Helsinki, Finland	22nd (q)	1.84m
2006	NACAC Under-23 Championships	Santo Domingo, Dominican Republic	1st	1.81m
2006	Commonwealth Games	Melbourne, Australia	5th	1.83m
2006	Central American and Caribbean Games	Cartagena, Colombia	3rd	1.88m
2007	NACAC Championships	San Salvador, El Salvador	1st	1.89m
2007	Pan American Games	Rio de Janeiro, Brazil	3rd	1.87m
2007	World Championships	Osaka, Japan	15th (f)	1.90m
2008	Central American and Caribbean Championships	Cali, Colombia	1st	1.91m
2008	Olympic Games	Beijing, China	27th (q)	1.85m
2009	Central American and Caribbean Championships	Havana, Cuba	1st	1.91m
2009	World Championships	Berlin, Germany	24th (q)	1.89m
2010	Central American and Caribbean Games	Mayagüez, Puerto Rico	1st	1.94m
2010	Continental Cup	Split, Croatia	3rd	1.88m
2010	Commonwealth Games	Delhi, India	3rd	1.88m
2011	Central American and Caribbean Championships	Mayagüez, Puerto Rico	1st	1.82m
2011	World Championships	Daegu, South Korea	13th (q)	1.92m
2011	Pan American Games	Guadalajara, Mexico	7th	1.81m A
2012	World Indoor Championships	Istanbul, Turkey	15th (q)	1.88m
2012	Olympic Games	London, United Kingdom	19th (q)	1.90m
2013	Central American and Caribbean Championships	Morelia, Mexico	1st	1.92m
2013	World Championships	Moscow, Russia	11th	1.89m
2014	World Indoor Championships	Sopot, Poland	7th	1.94m
2014	Commonwealth Games	Glasgow, United Kingdom	3rd	1.92m
2014	Pan American Sports Festival	Mexico City, Mexico	1st	1.88m A
2014	Continental Cup	Marrakesh, Morocco	5th	1.87m
2014	Central American and Caribbean Games	Veracruz, Mexico	1st	1.89m A
2015	Pan American Games	Toronto, Canada	1st	1.94m
2015	NACAC Championships	San José, Costa Rica	1st	1.91m
2015	World Championships	Beijing, China	12th	1.88m
2016	World Indoor Championships	Portland, United States	5th	1.93m
2016	Olympic Games	Rio de Janeiro, Brazil	6th	1.93m
2017	World Championships	London, United Kingdom	13th (q)	1.89m
2018	World Indoor Championships	Birmingham, United Kingdom	10th	1.84m
2018	Commonwealth Games	Gold Coast, Australia	1st	1.95m
2018	Central American and Caribbean Games	Barranquilla, Colombia	1st	1.90m
2018	NACAC Championships	Toronto, Canada	1st	1.91m
2019	Pan American Games	Lima, Peru	1st	1.87m
2019	World Championships	Doha, Qatar	13th (q)	1.92m
2021	Olympic Games	Tokyo, Japan	22nd (q)	1.86m

== Personal bests ==
Event	Result	Venue	Date
Outdoor
100 m	12.3 s (wind: NWI) (ht)	Grand Bay, Dominica	30 July 2003
200 m	24.22 s (wind: NWI)	Orlando, United States	30 April 2005
200 m	24.1 s (wind: NWI) (ht)	Castries, Saint Lucia	1 June 2003
High jump	1.98 m	Athens, United States	8 May 2010
Long jump	6.08 m (wind: 0.0 m/s )	Athens, United States	12 April 2014
Indoor
High jump	1.95 m	Sopot, Poland; Hustopeče, Czech Republic; Des Moines, United States; Třinec, Czech Republic	7 March 2014; 13 February 2016; 30 April 2016; 30 January 2018

=== Outdoor progression ===
Year	Height	Location	Date
2014	1.96m	Athens, United States	12 April 2014
2013	1.95m	Morelia	5 July 2013
2012	1.91m	Regensburg	2 June 2012
2011	1.94m	Hengelo	29 May 2011
2010	1.98m	Athens, United States	8 May 2010
2009	1.95m	Zaragoza, Spain	18 July 2009
2008	1.93m	Athens, United States	19 April 2008
2007	1.94m	Osaka, Japan	31 August 2007
2006	1.90m	Walnut, United States	15 April 2006
2005	1.94m	Nassau, Bahamas	10 July 2005
2004	1.88m	St. George's, Grenada	29 May 2004
2003	1.86m	Port-of-Spain, Trinidad & Tobago	21 April 2003
2003	1.86m	St. George's, Grenada	28 March 2003
2002	1.83m	Kingston, Jamaica	20 July 2002
2001	1.84m	St. George's, Grenada	27 June 2001
2000	1.73m	St. George's, Grenada	23 April 2000

== Honors and awards ==
Spencer is a recipient of the following:

- Saint Lucia - Medal of Merit (2016)

Olympic Games
Preceded by Zepherinus Joseph	Flagbearer for Saint Lucia; Beijing 2008; London 2012; Rio de Janeiro 2016; Tokyo 2020 with Jean-Luc Zephir	Succeeded by Michael Joseph
