= Brittany Brown (sprinter) =

American sprinter (born 1995)

Brittany Brown OLY
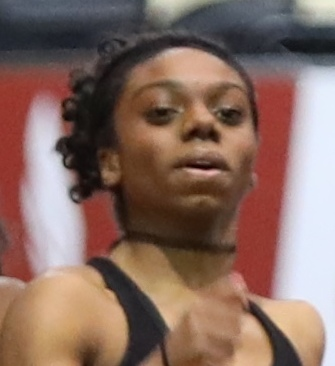
- Brown in 2019

Personal information
- Full name: Brittany Shamere Brown
- Nationality: American
- Born: April 18, 1995 (age 31) Fontana, California

Sport
- Country: United States
- Sport: Track and field
- Events: 100 meters, 200 meters
- College team: Iowa Hawkeyes

Achievements and titles
- Personal bests: 100 m: 10.90 (Eugene, 2023); 200 m: 21.89 (New York, 2025)
Medal record
Women's athletics
Representing United States
Olympic Games
Bronze medal – third place	2024 Paris	200 m
World Championships
Silver medal – second place	2019 Doha	200 m
Diamond League
First place	2024	200 m
First place	2025	200 m
NACAC Championships
Gold medal – first place	2022 Freeport	200 m

Brittany Shamere Brown (born April 18, 1995) is an American sprinter. She won the silver medal at the 2019 World Championships in the 200m event and the bronze medal in the 200m event at the 2024 Summer Olympics in Paris.

== Career ==
Attending Claremont High School, she set the all time 100m school record with a time of 11.49s (+2.2w) and the wind legal school record of 11.59s (+1.7) both of which still stand. She also set the all-time 200m record with a time of 23.68s (+3.1w) and the wind legal record of 23.79s (+0.6).

In 2019, Brown won the 300m event at the US Indoor Championships in a championship record of 35.95s. After finishing second in the 200m at the US Championships, she was selected for the 200m at the World Championships, where she won the silver medal in the final, recording a personal best time of 22.22s, finishing behind Dina Asher-Smith.

In 2020, Brown signed a contract with Adidas that took her through the 2024 US Olympic trials.

In 2022, she set new PBs in both the 100m and 200m, with 10.96s and 21.99, respectively. Brown won the 200m at the NACAC Championships, held in Freeport, Bahamas, in 22.35s (0.3).

At the 2023 Toyota USATF Outdoor Championships, Brown placed second in the 100m with a personal best time of 10.90s, thus qualifying her for the 2023 World Athletics Championships, where she made the final, finishing 7th.

Brown won her first Diamond League meeting at the 2024 Bislett Games, running 22.32 from lane eight. At the 2024 USATF Olympic trials in Eugene, she placed 2nd in the 200m, in a new personal best of 21.90s (0.6 m/s wind), behind Gabby Thomas and just ahead of McKenzie Long, to qualify for her maiden Olympic Games in Paris.

On July 18, 2024, Brown announced that she had signed a contract with Nike.

At the Paris 2024 Olympics, Brown secured a bronze medal with a time of 22.20 seconds in the women's 200 metres, finishing behind Gabby Thomas and Julien Alfred. On September 27, 2024, Brown won the 200m at the inaugural Athlos meet, also placing second in the 100m.

In December 2024, it was announced that she had signed up for the inaugural season of the Michael Johnson-founded Grand Slam Track.

== Athletics achievements ==
Information from her World Athletics profile unless otherwise noted.

=== Personal bests ===
Type	Distance	Time (s)	Wind (m/s)	Venue	Date	Notes
Individual events
Indoor	60 metres	7.19	—N/a	Iowa City, United States	21 January 2023	
Indoor	200 metres sh	22.86	—N/a	College Station, United States	10 March 2017	
Indoor	300 metres sh	35.95	—N/a	New York, United States	23 February 2019	
Indoor	400 metres sh	53.76	—N/a	New York, United States	9 February 2019	
Outdoor	100 metres	10.90	+0.7	Eugene, United States	7 July 2023	
Outdoor	200 metres	21.89	+1.9	New York, United States	10 October 2025	
Outdoor	300 metres	35.91	—N/a	Ostrava, Czech Republic	20 June 2019	
Outdoor	400 metres	51.15	—N/a	Gainesville, United States	15 April 2023	
Team events
Outdoor	4 × 100 metres relay	42.12	—N/a	Austin, United States	1 April 2023	
Outdoor	4 × 200 metres relay	1:30.65	—N/a	Austin, United States	26 March 2022	
Outdoor	4 × 400 metres relay	3:24.82	—N/a	Austin, United States	1 April 2023	

=== International competitions ===
Representing the United States
Year	Competition	Venue	Position	Event	Time	Notes
2018	NACAC Championships	Toronto, Canada	7th	200 m	23.46	
2019	The Match Europe v USA	Minsk, Belarus	1st	200 m	22.61	
2019	World Championships	Doha, Qatar	2nd	200 m	22.22	PB
2022	NACAC Championships	Freeport, The Bahamas	1st	200 m	22.35	CR
2023	World Championships	Budapest, Hungary	7th	100 m	10.97	
2024	Olympic Games	Paris, France	3rd	200 m	22.20	
2025	World Championships	Tokyo, Japan	6th	200 m	22.54	

=== National championships and competitions ===
Year	Competition	Venue	Position	Event	Time	Notes
2013	USATF Junior Olympics	Greensboro, North Carolina	1st	100 m	11.61	
2014	NCAA Division I Championships	Eugene, Oregon	11th (h)	200 m	23.35	
2014	NCAA Division I Championships	Eugene, Oregon	16th (h)	4 × 100 m relay	45.02	
2014	USA Junior Championships	Eugene, Oregon	6th	100 m	11.58	
2014	USA Junior Championships	Eugene, Oregon	3rd	200 m	23.10	
2015	NCAA Division I Championships	Eugene, Oregon	17th (h)	200 m	23.19	
2017	NCAA Division I Indoor Championships	College Station, Texas	5th	200 m sh	22.92	
2017	NCAA Division I Championships	Eugene, Oregon	7th	200 m	23.02	
2017	USA Championships	Sacramento, California	15th (sf)	200 m	23.40	
2018	NCAA Division I Indoor Championships	College Station, Texas	10th (h)	200 m sh	23.16	
2018	NCAA Division I Indoor Championships	College Station, Texas	9th	4 × 400 m relay	3:33.19	SB
2018	NCAA Division I Championships	Eugene, Oregon	23rd (sf)	100 m	11.51	
2018	NCAA Division I Championships	Eugene, Oregon	14th (sf)	200 m	22.89	
2018	USA Championships	Des Moines, Iowa	5th	200 m	23.08	
2019	USA Indoor Championships	New York, United States	1st	300 m sh	35.95	CR
2019	USA Championships	Des Moines, Iowa	2nd	200 m	22.61	
2021	U.S. Olympic Trials	Eugene, Oregon	15th (sf)	200 m	22.97	
2022	USA Championships	Eugene, Oregon	8th	100 m	11.04	
2022	USA Championships	Eugene, Oregon	5th	200 m	22.22	
2023	USA Indoor Championships	Albuquerque, New Mexico	8th	60 m	7.21	
2023	USA Championships	Eugene, Oregon	2nd	100 m	10.90	
2024	U.S. Olympic Trials	Eugene, Oregon	2nd	200 m	21.90	
2025	USA Championships	Eugene, Oregon	4th	200 m	22.20	
2026	USA Championships	New York, United States	16th (sf)	100 m	11.25	SB
