= Saint Lucia at the Olympics =

- IOC code: LCA
- NOC: Saint Lucia Olympic Committee
- Website: slunoc.org
- Medals Ranked 111th: Gold 1 Silver 1 Bronze 0 Total 2

Summer appearances
- 1996; 2000; 2004; 2008; 2012; 2016; 2020; 2024

Saint Lucia first participated at the Olympic Games in 1996, and has sent athletes to compete in every Summer Olympic Games since then. The nation has never participated in the Winter Olympic Games.

Julien Alfred won the nation's first and only medals to date in 2024, earning both a gold in the women's 100 metres with a new national record (10.72s), and a silver in the women's 200 metres. It was the first time since 2004 that the 100m winner was not an athlete from Jamaica.

The National Olympic Committee for Saint Lucia was created in 1987 and recognized by the International Olympic Committee in 1993.

== Medal tables ==
=== Medals by Summer Games ===
Games	Athletes	Gold	Silver	Bronze	Total	Rank
1996 Atlanta	6	0	0	0	0	–
2000 Sydney	5	0	0	0	0	–
2004 Athens	2	0	0	0	0	–
2008 Beijing	4	0	0	0	0	–
2012 London	4	0	0	0	0	–
2016 Rio de Janeiro	5	0	0	0	0	–
2020 Tokyo	5	0	0	0	0	–
2024 Paris	4	1	1	0	2	55
2028 Los Angeles	future event					
2032 Brisbane	future event					
Total		1	1	0	2	111

=== Medals by summer sport ===
Sport	Gold	Silver	Bronze	Total
Athletics	1	1	0	2
Totals (1 entries)	1	1	0	2

== List of medalists ==
Medal	Name	Games	Sport	Event
Gold	Julien Alfred	2024 Paris	Athletics	Women's 100 metres
Silver	Julien Alfred	2024 Paris	Athletics	Women's 200 metres

== See also ==
- List of flag bearers for Saint Lucia at the Olympics
- Category:Olympic competitors for Saint Lucia
