= 2025 World Athletics Championships – Women's 200 metres =

Women's 200 metres at the 2025 World Athletics Championships
- Venue: National Stadium
- Location: Tokyo, Japan
- Dates: 17 September (heats); 18 September (semi-finals); 19 September (final)
- Winning time: 21.68 WL

Medalists
gold medal	Melissa Jefferson-Wooden	United States
silver medal	Amy Hunt	Great Britain
bronze medal	Shericka Jackson	Jamaica

The women's 200 metres at the 2025 World Athletics Championships was held at the National Stadium in Tokyo on 17, 18 and 19 September 2025.

== Records ==
Before the competition records were as follows:

Record	Athlete & Nat.	Perf.	Location	Date
World record	Florence Griffith-Joyner (USA)	21.34	Seoul, South Korea	29 September 1988
Championship record	Shericka Jackson (JAM)	21.41	Budapest, Hungary	25 August 2023
World Leading	Julien Alfred (LCA)	21.51	London, United Kingdom	19 July 2025
African Record	Christine Mboma (NAM)	21.78	Zürich, Switzerland	9 September 2021
Asian Record	Li Xuemei (CHN)	22.01	Shanghai, China	22 October 1997
European Record	Dafne Schippers (NED)	21.63	Beijing, China	28 August 2015
North, Central American and Caribbean record	Florence Griffith-Joyner (USA)	21.34	Seoul, South Korea	29 September 1988
Oceanian record	Melinda Gainsford (AUS)	22.23	Stuttgart, Germany	13 July 1997
South American Record	Vitoria Cristina Rosa (BRA)	22.47	Eugene, United States	19 July 2022

== Qualification standard ==
The standard to qualify automatically for entry was 22.57.

== Schedule ==
The event schedule, in local time (UTC+9), was as follows:

Date	Time	Round
17 September	19:30	Heats
18 September	21:24	Semi-finals
19 September	22:22	Final

== Results ==
=== Heats ===
The heats will take place on 17 September. The first three athletes in each heat ( Q ) and the next six fastest ( q ) qualified for the semi-finals.

==== Heat 1 ====
Place	Lane	Athlete	Nation	Time	Notes
1	8	Anavia Battle	United States	22.07	Q
2	3	Marie Josée Ta Lou-Smith	Ivory Coast	22.39	Q
3	4	Polyniki Emmanouilidou	Greece	22.92	Q, SB
4	9	Shanti Pereira	Singapore	23.13	
5	5	Boglárka Takács	Hungary	23.18	
6	2	Jacqueline Madogo	Canada	23.23	
7	6	Gabrielle Matthews	Jamaica	23.40	
8	7	Fatouma Conde	Guinea	23.42	NR
				Wind: (+0.1 m/s)	

==== Heat 2 ====
Place	Lane	Athlete	Nation	Time	Notes
1	7	Melissa Jefferson-Wooden	United States	22.24	Q
2	6	Thelma Davies	Liberia	22.76	Q
3	5	Jessika Gbai	Ivory Coast	22.81	Q
4	9	Helene Parisot	France	22.90	q
5	2	Olivia Fotopoulou	Cyprus	22.98	q
6	8	Mia Gross	Australia	23.24	
7	3	Jessica-Bianca Wessolly	Germany	23.33	
8	4	Maria Carmona	Nicaragua	24.14	
				Wind: (−0.3 m/s)	

==== Heat 3 ====
Place	Lane	Athlete	Nation	Time	Notes
1	7	Mckenzie Long	United States	22.51	Q
2	3	Ashanti Moore	Jamaica	22.57	Q
3	5	Sophia Junk	Germany	22.81	Q
4	9	Julia Henriksson	Sweden	22.86	q
5	2	Beyoncé Defreitas	British Virgin Islands	23.30	
6	6	Kristie Edwards	Australia	23.39	
7	8	Alinny Delgadillo Silva	Bolivia	25.13	
	4	Liranyi Alonso	Dominican Republic	DNS	
				Wind: (−0.2 m/s)	

==== Heat 4 ====
Place	Lane	Athlete	Nation	Time	Notes
1	3	Brittany Brown	United States	22.50	Q
2	4	Anthonique Strachan	Bahamas	22.57	Q, SB
3	5	Daryll Neita	Great Britain & N.I.	22.59	Q
4	9	Léonie Pointet	Switzerland	23.04	
5	2	Dalia Kaddari	Italy	23.11	
6	8	Leah Bertrand	Trinidad and Tobago	23.33	
7	7	Nora Lindahl	Sweden	23.35	
8	6	Li Yuting	China	23.64	
				Wind: (+0.1 m/s)	

==== Heat 5 ====
Place	Lane	Athlete	Nation	Time	Notes
1	9	Shericka Jackson	Jamaica	22.33	Q
2	5	Amy Hunt	Great Britain & N.I.	22.57	Q
3	6	Imke Vervaet	Belgium	22.74	Q
4	8	Audrey Leduc	Canada	22.82	q
5	4	Abigeirufuka Ido	Japan	22.98	q
6	7	Lorène Bazolo	Portugal	23.07	
7	3	Ann Marii Kivikas	Estonia	23.14	
8	2	Anahí Suárez	Ecuador	23.50	
				Wind: (±0.0 m/s)	

==== Heat 6 ====
Place	Lane	Athlete	Nation	Time	Notes
1	7	Dina Asher-Smith	Great Britain & N.I.	22.40	Q
2	8	Torrie Lewis	Australia	22.56	Q, PB
3	5	Jaël Bestué	Spain	22.74	Q
4	4	Miriam Sánchez	Mexico	23.01	q
5	2	Maboundou Koné	Ivory Coast	23.11	
6	6	Marije van Hunenstijn	Netherlands	23.13	
7	9	Chen Yujie	China	23.26	
8	3	Vittoria Fontana	Italy	23.31	
				Wind: (±0.0 m/s)	

=== Semi-finals ===
The semi-finals took place on 17 September. The first two athletes in each heat ( Q ) and the next three fastest ( q ) qualified for the final. As Anthonique Strachan and Mckenzie Long each finished with the same time to the thousandth of a second, both runners qualified for the final.

==== Heat 1 ====
Place	Lane	Athlete	Nation	Time	Notes
1	7	Shericka Jackson	Jamaica	21.99	Q, SB
2	5	Amy Hunt	Great Britain & N.I.	22.08	Q, PB
3	8	Brittany Brown	United States	22.13	q, =SB
4	6	Anthonique Strachan	Bahamas	22.48 [.478]	q, SB
5	4	Jessika Gbai	Ivory Coast	22.56	SB
6	9	Jaël Bestué	Spain	22.80	
7	2	Helene Parisot	France	22.87	
8	3	Abigeirufuka Ido	Japan	23.15	
				Wind: (−0.1 m/s)	

==== Heat 2 ====
Place	Lane	Athlete	Nation	Time	Notes
1	7	Melissa Jefferson-Wooden	United States	22.00	Q
2	6	Dina Asher-Smith	Great Britain & N.I.	22.21	Q
3	4	Ashanti Moore	Jamaica	22.51	
4	8	Torrie Lewis	Australia	22.69	
5	5	Sophia Junk	Germany	22.71	
6	9	Imke Vervaet	Belgium	22.79	
7	3	Julia Henriksson	Sweden	22.93	
8	2	Olivia Fotopoulou	Cyprus	23.02	
				Wind: (+0.1 m/s)	

==== Heat 3 ====
Place	Lane	Athlete	Nation	Time	Notes
1	6	Anavia Battle	United States	22.09	Q
2	7	Marie Josée Ta Lou-Smith	Ivory Coast	22.17	Q, SB
3	8	Mckenzie Long	United States	22.48 [.478]	q
4	9	Daryll Neita	Great Britain & N.I.	22.77	
5	2	Audrey Leduc	Canada	22.90	
6	4	Thelma Davies	Liberia	23.00	
7	5	Polyniki Emmanouilidou	Greece	23.04	
8	3	Miriam Sánchez	Mexico	23.12	
				Wind: (−0.3 m/s)	

=== Final ===
The final took place on 19 September.

Place	Lane	Athlete	Nation	Time	Notes
1st place, gold medalist(s)	6	Melissa Jefferson-Wooden	United States	21.68	WL
2nd place, silver medalist(s)	5	Amy Hunt	Great Britain & N.I.	22.14	
3rd place, bronze medalist(s)	7	Shericka Jackson	Jamaica	22.18	
4	8	Anavia Battle	United States	22.22	
5	9	Dina Asher-Smith	Great Britain & N.I.	22.43	
6	3	Brittany Brown	United States	22.54	
7	4	Marie Josée Ta Lou-Smith	Ivory Coast	22.62	
8	2	Mckenzie Long	United States	22.78	
—	1	Anthonique Strachan	Bahamas	DQ	TR16.8
				Wind: (−0.1 m/s)	
