= Saint Lucia at the 1996 Summer Olympics =

- IOC code: LCA
- NOC: Saint Lucia Olympic Committee
- Website: www.slunoc.org

in Atlanta
- Competitors: 6 in 2 sports
- Flag bearer: Michelle Baptiste
- Medals: Gold 0 Silver 0 Bronze 0 Total 0

Summer Olympics appearances (overview)
- 1996; 2000; 2004; 2008; 2012; 2016; 2020; 2024

Saint Lucia was represented at the 1996 Summer Olympics in Atlanta, Georgia, United States by the Saint Lucia Olympic Committee. It was their first appearance at the Olympics.

In total, six athletes including five men and one woman represented Saint Lucia in two different sports including athletics and sailing.

== Background ==
The Saint Lucia Olympic Committee was formed in 1987 but was not fully recognised by the International Olympic Committee (IOC) until 1993 meaning they couldn't make their Olympic debut until the 1996 Summer Olympics in Atlanta, Georgia, United States.

== Competitors ==
In total, six athletes represented Saint Lucia at the 1996 Summer Olympics in Atlanta, Georgia, United States across two different sports.

Sport	Men	Women	Total
Athletics	4	1	5
Sailing	1	0	1
Total	5	1	6

== Athletics ==
In total, five Saint Lucian athletes participated in the athletics events – Michelle Baptiste in the women's 100 m, Ivan Jean-Marie in the men's 400 m and the 4 × 400 m relay, Dominic Johnson in the pole vault and the men's 4 × 400 m relay and Maxime Charlemagne and Maxwell Seales in the men's 4 × 400 m relay.

The athletics events took place at the Centennial Olympic Stadium in Atlanta from 26 July to 3 August 1996.

Men

Athlete	Event	Heat		Quarterfinal		Semifinal		Final	
Athlete	Event	Result	Rank	Result	Rank	Result	Rank	Result	Rank
Ivan Jean-Marie	400 m	47.15	7	did not advance					
Dominic Johnson; Ivan Jean-Marie; Maxime Charlemagne; Maxwell Seales	4 × 400 m relay	3:10.51	5	—N/a		did not advance			

Field

Athlete	Event	Qualification		Final	
Athlete	Event	Distance	Position	Distance	Position
Dominic Johnson	pole vault	NM	—	did not advance	

Women

Athlete	Event	Heat		Quarterfinal		Semifinal		Final	
Athlete	Event	Result	Rank	Result	Rank	Result	Rank	Result	Rank
Michelle Baptiste	100 m	11.92	7	did not advance					

== Sailing ==
In total, one Saint Lucian athlete participated in the sailing events – Michael Green in the laser.

The Sailing events took place at the Wassaw Sound in Savannah, Georgia from 22 July to 2 August 1996.

Athlete	Event	Race											Net points	Final rank
Athlete	Event	1	2	3	4	5	6	7	8	9	10	11	Net points	Final rank
Michael Green	Laser	~~42~~	40	40	38	41	41	37	32	42	~~44~~	31	428	45

== Aftermath ==
The six athletes sent to the 1996 Summer Olympics remains a record delegation for Saint Lucia. They have attended every Summer Olympics since their debut. However, they would not win a medal until the 2024 Summer Olympics in Paris, France.
