= Saint Lucia at the 2024 Summer Olympics =

- IOC code: LCA
- NOC: Saint Lucia Olympic Committee
- Website: www.slunoc.org

in Paris, France 26 July 2024 – 11 August 2024
- Competitors: 4 (3 men and 1 woman) in 3 sports
- Flag bearer: Michael Joseph
- Officials: Helena Renee-Emmanuel (chef de mission)
- Medals Ranked 55th: Gold 1 Silver 1 Bronze 0 Total 2

Summer Olympics appearances (overview)
- 1996; 2000; 2004; 2008; 2012; 2016; 2020; 2024

Saint Lucia competed at the 2024 Summer Olympics in Paris from 26 July to 11 August 2024. It was the nation's eighth consecutive appearance at the Summer Olympics.

The Saint Lucia Olympic Committee appointed Helena Renee-Emmanuel as the nation's chef de mission for Paris 2024.

Julien Alfred won the nation's first Olympic medal in history, a gold in the women's 100 metres, with a new national record (10.72s). Alfred followed this win with a silver in the 200 metres three days later.

== Medalists ==
Medal	Name	Sport	Event	Date
Gold	Julien Alfred	Athletics	Women's 100 m	3 August
Silver	Julien Alfred	Athletics	Women's 200 m	6 August

== Competitors ==
The following is the list of number of competitors in the Games.

Sport	Men	Women	Total
Athletics	1	1	2
Sailing	1	0	1
Swimming	1	0	1
Total	3	1	4

== Athletics ==
Saint Lucian track and field athletes achieved the entry standards for Paris 2024, either by passing the direct qualifying mark (or time for track and road races) or by world ranking, in the following events (a maximum of 3 athletes each):. Julien Alfred made history on 3 August 2024 by winning gold in the women's 100m final.

Key

- Note–Ranks given for track events are within the athlete's heat only
- Q = Qualified for the next round
- q = Qualified for the next round as a fastest loser or, in field events, by position without achieving the qualifying target
- NR = National record
- N/A = Round not applicable for the event
- Bye = Athlete not required to compete in round

Track & road events

Athlete	Event	Heat		Repechage		Semifinal		Final	
Athlete	Event	Result	Rank	Result	Rank	Result	Rank	Result	Rank
Michael Joseph	Men's 400 m	45.69	8 R	45.64	4	Did not advance			
Julien Alfred	Women's 100 m	10.95	5 Q	—N/a		10.84	1 Q	10.72 NR	1st place, gold medalist(s)
Julien Alfred	Women's 200 m	22.41	1 Q	—N/a		21.98	2 Q	22.08	2nd place, silver medalist(s)

== Sailing ==
Saint Lucia sent one sailor to compete at the games after receiving the allocations of Universality places.

Medal race events

Athlete	Event	Race											Net points	Final rank
Athlete	Event	1	2	3	4	5	6	7	8	9	10	M*	Net points	Final rank
Luc Chevrier	Men's ILCA 7	24	36	19	25	11	28	27	29	Canceled		EL	163	29

M = Medal race; EL = Eliminated – did not advance into the medal race

== Swimming ==
Saint Lucia sent one swimmer to compete at the 2024 Paris Olympics.

Athlete	Event	Heat		Semifinal		Final	
Athlete	Event	Time	Rank	Time	Rank	Time	Rank
Jayhan Odlum-Smith	Men's 100 m freestyle	50.39	=44	Did not advance			

Qualifiers for the latter rounds of all events were decided on a time only basis, therefore positions shown are overall results versus competitors in all heats.

== See also ==
- Saint Lucia at the 2023 Pan American Games
