= Saint Lucia at the 2020 Summer Olympics =

- IOC code: LCA
- NOC: Saint Lucia Olympic Committee
- Website: www.slunoc.org

in Tokyo, Japan July 23, 2021 – August 8, 2021
- Competitors: 5 in 3 sports
- Flag bearers (opening): Levern Spencer; Jean-Luc Zephir
- Flag bearer (closing): Levern Spencer
- Medals: Gold 0 Silver 0 Bronze 0 Total 0

Summer Olympics appearances (overview)
- 1996; 2000; 2004; 2008; 2012; 2016; 2020; 2024

Saint Lucia competed at the 2020 Summer Olympics in Tokyo, Japan. Originally scheduled to take place from 24 July to 9 August 2020, the Games were postponed to 23 July to 8 August 2021, because of the COVID-19 pandemic. It was the nation's seventh consecutive appearance at the Summer Olympics. The nation was seeking its first Olympic medal; Levern Spencer's 6th-place finish in the 2016 high jump was Saint Lucia's best result to date at the time of this Olympics.

The country's planning for the 2020 Games began shortly after the conclusion of the 2016 Summer Olympics, with Saint Lucia Olympic Committee president Fortuna Belrose noting that some athletes had already expressed interest and submitted programmes. Saint Lucia's Olympic hopefuls include Spencer (who would be a four-time Olympian), Jeanelle Scheper (a 2016 Olympian), Albert Reynolds, Sandisha Antoine, and Julien Alfred. The COVID-19 pandemic has affected preparations, training, and qualification efforts; Belrose and the SLOC have committed to supporting athletes in qualifying for the postponed Games.

== Competitors ==
The following is the list of number of competitors in the Games.

Sport	Men	Women	Total
Athletics	0	1	1
Sailing	1	1	2
Swimming	1	1	2
Total	2	3	5

== Athletics ==
Saint Lucian athletes further achieved the entry standards, either by qualifying time or by world ranking, in the following track and field events (up to a maximum of 3 athletes in each event):

Key

- Note–Ranks given for track events are within the athlete's heat only
- Q = Qualified for the next round
- q = Qualified for the next round as a fastest loser or, in field events, by position without achieving the qualifying target
- NR = National record
- N/A = Round not applicable for the event
- Bye = Athlete not required to compete in round

Field events

Athlete	Event	Qualification		Final	
Athlete	Event	Distance	Position	Distance	Position
Levern Spencer	Women's high jump	1.86	=22	Did not advance	

== Sailing ==
Saint Lucia received an invitation from the Tripartite Commission to send sailors competing in the men's Laser and women's Laser Radial to the Olympic regatta.

Athlete	Event	Race											Net points	Final rank
Athlete	Event	1	2	3	4	5	6	7	8	9	10	M*	Net points	Final rank
Luc Chevrier	Men's Laser	30	~~34~~	32	33	34	14	28	30	30	30	EL	261	31
Stephanie Devaux-Lovell	Women's Laser Radial	14	36	34	5	35	27	~~BFD~~	38	11	16	EL	216	28

M = Medal race; EL = Eliminated – did not advance into the medal race

== Swimming ==
Saint Lucia received a universality invitation from FINA to send two top-ranked swimmers (one per gender) in their respective individual events to the Olympics, based on the FINA Points System of June 28, 2021.

Athlete	Event	Heat		Semifinal		Final	
Athlete	Event	Time	Rank	Time	Rank	Time	Rank
Jean-Luc Zephir	Men's 100 m freestyle	51.94	54	Did not advance			
Mikaili Charlemagne	Women's 50 m freestyle	26.99 NR	49	Did not advance			

== See also ==
- Saint Lucia at the 2019 Pan American Games
