= Saint Lucia at the 2004 Summer Olympics =

- IOC code: LCA
- NOC: Saint Lucia Olympic Committee
- Website: www.slunoc.org

in Athens
- Competitors: 2 in 2 sports
- Flag bearer: Zepherinus Joseph
- Medals: Gold 0 Silver 0 Bronze 0 Total 0

Summer Olympics appearances (overview)
- 1996; 2000; 2004; 2008; 2012; 2016; 2020; 2024

Saint Lucia competed at the 2004 Summer Olympics in Athens, Greece from 13 to 29 August 2004. Saint Lucia's athletes marched out first at the parade of nations at the Opening Ceremony as the first country in order of the Greek alphabet, and because hosts Greece marched last instead of their usual position at the head of the parade.

== History ==
Throughout the 17th and 18th centuries possession of Saint Lucia was argued by the British and the French. Control of Saint Lucia swapped between the two countries 14 separate times, finally ending up in the control of the United Kingdom in 1814. Saint Lucia was granted self rule by the British in 1967. Saint Lucia became an independent nation in 1979.

Saint Lucia formed its National Olympic Committee in 1987. Saint Lucia's NOC gained recognition by the International Olympic Committee on 24 September, 1993. As of 2004 Saint Lucia had previously competed in the olympics twice.

== Athletics ==
Athletes from Saint Lucia achieved qualifying standards in athletics events (up to a maximum of 3 athletes in each event at the 'A' Standard, and 1 at the 'B' Standard):

Saint Lucia was represented by one male athlete at the 2004 Summer Olympics, Zepherinus Joseph who competed in the men's marathon. This was the first Olympic appearance for Joseph. Zepherinus Joseph competed in the men's marathon. Joseph finished with a time of 2:44:19 finishing eightieth in the standings. The medals in the event went to athletes from Italy, the United States, and Brazil.

Key

- Note–Ranks given for track events are within the athlete's heat only
- Q = Qualified for the next round
- q = Qualified for the next round as a fastest loser or, in field events, by position without achieving the qualifying target
- NR = National record
- N/A = Round not applicable for the event
- Bye = Athlete not required to compete in round

Men

Athlete	Event	Final	
Athlete	Event	Result	Rank
Zepherinus Joseph	Marathon	2:44:19	80

== Swimming ==
Georgeos competed at the Athens Olympic Aquatic Centre during the 2004 Summer Olympics.

Saint Lucia was represented by one female athlete at the 2004 Summer Olympics, Natasha Sara Georgeos who competed in the women's 100 meter butterfly. This was Georgeos' first Olympic appearance.

Natasha Sara Georgeos competed in the women's 100 meter butterfly, she placed sixth in her heat, ending at thirty eighth in the standings. Georgeos failed to advance past the first round. Medals in the events went to athletes from Australia, Poland and the Netherlands.

Women

Athlete	Event	Heat		Semifinal		Final	
Athlete	Event	Time	Rank	Time	Rank	Time	Rank
Natasha Sara Georgeos	100 m butterfly	1:07.94	6	did not advance			
