= Jacqueline Madogo =

Canadian athlete (born 2000)

Personal information
- Nationality: Canadian
- Born: 14 April 2000 (age 26) Ottawa, Ontario, Canada

Sport
- Sport: Athletics
- Event: Sprint

Achievements and titles
- Personal best(s): 60m: 7.25 (Windsor, 2023); 100m: 11.14 (Edmonton, 2024); 200m: 22.58 (Paris, 2024)
Medal record
Women's athletics
Representing Canada
World Relays
Gold medal – first place	2025 Guangzhou	mixed 4×100 m relay

Jacqueline Madogo (born 14 April 2000) is a Canadian sprinter. She became Canadian national champion over 200 metres in 2023.

== Early life ==
She attended Collège catholique Franco-Ouest in Ottawa. She was a keen soccer player in her youth and was coached for three years by Olympian Kristina Kiss at the West Ottawa Soccer Club and played in an Ontario Youth Soccer Cup semifinal. She also participated in volleyball, touch football and track and field and during her second year at the University of Guelph began taking athletics seriously.

== Career ==
At the 2022 U Sports national championships, she won the 60 metres in a personal-best 7.30 seconds. She placed fourth in the women's 100 metres national final and was selected for the relay pool at the 2022 World Athletics Championships in Eugene, Oregon. She competed at the event as the Canadian relay team finished fifth in their qualifying heat.

In July 2023, she won a sprint double at the Athletics Ontario Open Championships in Toronto, winning the 100 metres in 11.32 seconds and the 200 metres in 23.16 seconds. Later that month she won the Canadian Athletics Championships 200 metres race in Langley, with a personal best time of 22.91 seconds.

In June 2024, she set a meet record competing at La Classique d'athlétisme in Montreal, winning the 200 metres in a time of 23.09 seconds. She competed at the 2024 Summer Olympics in Paris over 200 metres, reaching the semi-finals and twice breaking her personal best time. She also competed in the 100 metres race at the Games. She was a member of the Canada relay team that competed in the 4 × 100 m relay at the Games and placed sixth in the final.

Madogo was selected for the Canadian relay pool for the 2025 World Athletics Relays in Guangzhou, China in May 2025. She ran in the mixed 4 x 100 metres relay, which made its debut as an event at the championships, as Canada won their heat and clinched their place in the final with the fastest time.

In September 2025, she competed in the 200 metres at the 2025 World Championships in Tokyo, Japan. She also ran in the women's 4 x 100 metres relay at the championships as Canada placed seventh.

Madogo was selected as part of the Canada team for the 2026 World Athletics Relays in Gaborone, Botswana.
