= Saint Lucia at the 2016 Summer Olympics =

- IOC code: LCA
- NOC: Saint Lucia Olympic Committee
- Website: www.slunoc.org

in Rio de Janeiro
- Competitors: 5 in 3 sports
- Flag bearer: Levern Spencer
- Medals: Gold 0 Silver 0 Bronze 0 Total 0

Summer Olympics appearances (overview)
- 1996; 2000; 2004; 2008; 2012; 2016; 2020; 2024

Saint Lucia competed at the 2016 Summer Olympics in Rio de Janeiro, Brazil, from 5 to 21 August 2016. This was the nation's sixth consecutive appearance at the Summer Olympics.

Saint Lucia Olympic Committee sent a team of five athletes, two men and three women, to compete only in sailing, swimming, and track and field at the Games, matching the nation's roster size with Sydney 2000 and beating the record by a single athlete set in both Beijing 2008 and London 2012. Two Saint Lucian athletes were awarded universality places to compete in their respective sporting events, while the rest of the team qualified directly for the Games on merit.

High jumper and Pan American Games champion Levern Spencer spearheaded the Saint Lucian delegation for the third consecutive time, as the oldest and most experienced competitor (aged 32) and the nation's flag bearer in the opening ceremony. Other notable athletes on the roster featured Spencer's teammate Jeanelle Scheper and ex-NFL running back turned track sprinter Jahvid Best. Saint Lucia, however, has yet to win its first ever Olympic medal.

== Athletics (track and field) ==
Athletes from Saint Lucia have so far achieved qualifying standards in the following athletics events (up to a maximum of 3 athletes in each event):

Key

- Note–Ranks given for track events are within the athlete's heat only
- Q = Qualified for the next round
- q = Qualified for the next round as a fastest loser or, in field events, by position without achieving the qualifying target
- NR = National record
- N/A = Round not applicable for the event
- Bye = Athlete not required to compete in round

Track & road events

Athlete	Event	Heat		Quarterfinal		Semifinal		Final	
Athlete	Event	Result	Rank	Result	Rank	Result	Rank	Result	Rank
Jahvid Best	Men's 100 m	Bye		10.39	7	did not advance			

Field events

Athlete	Event	Qualification		Final	
Athlete	Event	Distance	Position	Distance	Position
Jeanelle Scheper	Women's high jump	1.89	25	did not advance	
Levern Spencer	Women's high jump	1.94	=1 Q	1.93	6

== Sailing ==
Saint Lucia has received an invitation from the Tripartite Commission to send a sailor competing in the Laser Radial class to the Olympics.

Athlete	Event	Race											Net points	Final rank
Athlete	Event	1	2	3	4	5	6	7	8	9	10	M*	Net points	Final rank
Stephanie Devaux-Lovell	Women's Laser Radial	29	25	30	~~33~~	30	29	24	3	27	30	EL	226	29

M = Medal race; EL = Eliminated – did not advance into the medal race

== Swimming ==
Saint Lucia has received a Universality invitation from FINA to send a male swimmer to the Olympics.

Athlete	Event	Heat		Semifinal		Final	
Athlete	Event	Time	Rank	Time	Rank	Time	Rank
Jordan Augier	Men's 50 m freestyle	23.28	45	did not advance			

== See also ==
- Saint Lucia at the 2015 Pan American Games
