= Athletics at the 2024 Summer Olympics – Women's 100 metres =

Women's 100 metres at the Games of the XXXIII Olympiad
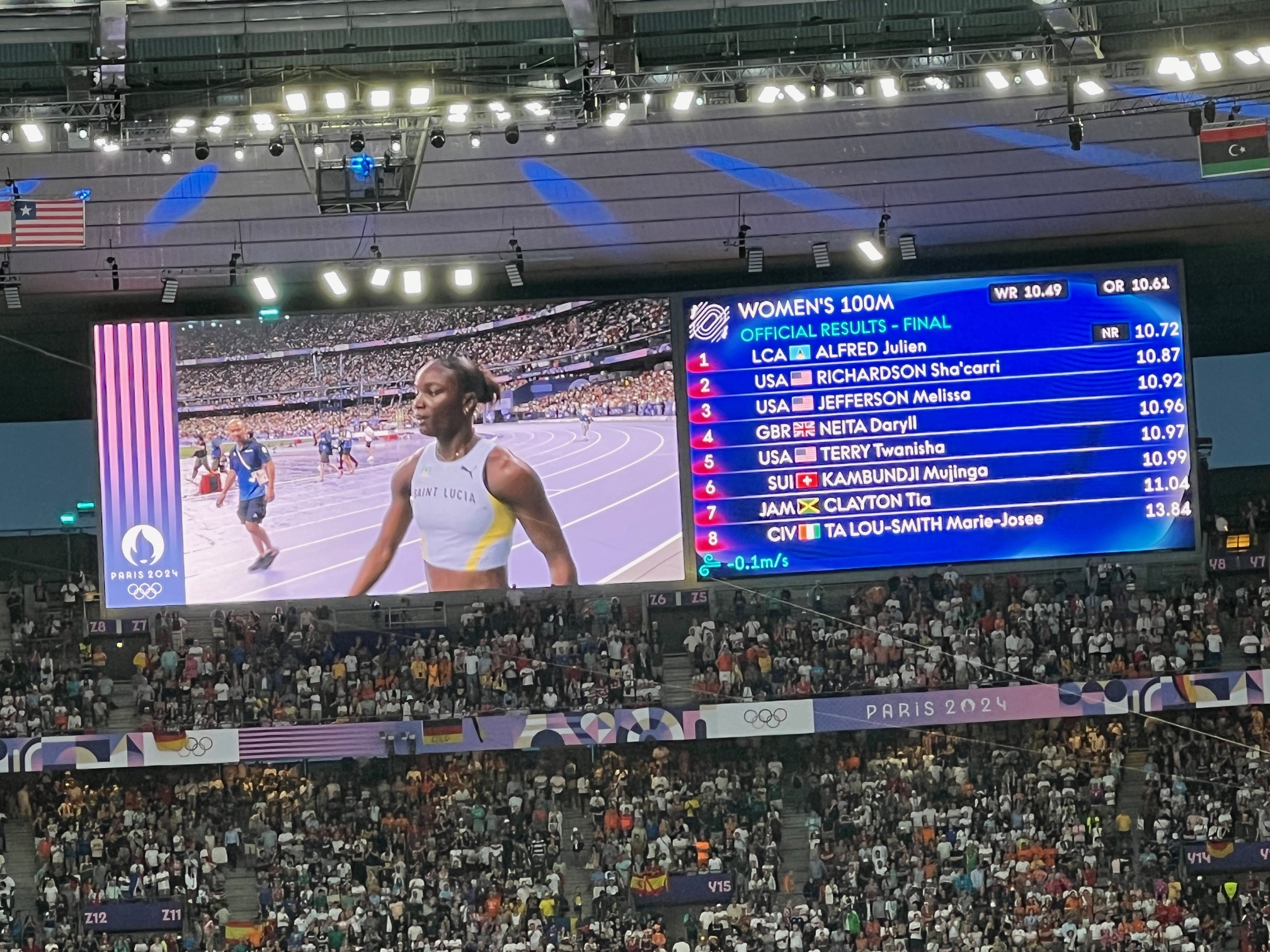
- The video display at Stade de France, showing the women's 100 meters results and an image of winner Julien Alfred of Saint Lucia
- Venue: Stade de France, Paris, France
- Dates: 2 August 2024 (preliminary round); 2 August 2024 (round 1); 3 August 2024 (semi-finals); 3 August 2024 (final)
- Competitors: 91 from 73 nations
- Winning time: 10.72

Medalists
| 1st place, gold medalist(s) | | Julien Alfred | Saint Lucia |
| 2nd place, silver medalist(s) | | Sha'Carri Richardson | United States |
| 3rd place, bronze medalist(s) | | Melissa Jefferson | United States |

Official Video

The women's 100 metres at the 2024 Summer Olympics was held in four rounds at the Stade de France in Paris, France, on 2 and 3 August 2024. This was the twenty-third time that the women's 100 metres has been contested at the Summer Olympics. A total of 40 athletes qualified for the event by entry standard or ranking. Julien Alfred won Saint Lucia's first-ever Olympic medal after taking gold in the final.

== Summary ==
Elaine Thompson-Herah who had won the last two 100 m Olympic titles, was unable to defend her Olympic title as an achilles tendon injury forced her to withdraw from the Jamaican Olympic trials; 2020 bronze medallist Shericka Jackson pulled out after suffering an injury at the Gyulai István Memorial to "protect her body" before her primary event, the 200 metres; World number two Jacious Sears was injured in the SEC Championships and was unable to compete at the US Trials.

Reigning World champion, Sha'Carri Richardson, tied with Jackson for #6 of all time, won the US Trials, and was viewed as one of the favourites for the title. 2008 and 2012 Olympic champion Shelly-Ann Fraser-Pryce also returned after finishing third at the Jamaican Trials behind Jackson and teenager Tia Clayton. Meanwhile, 2017 World silver medalist and African record holder Marie Josée Ta Lou-Smith, was also seen as a strong contender. World number-four Melissa Jefferson and world number-ten Twanisha Terry had both pushed themselves into medal contention by qualifying for their first Olympics through the US Trials. World Indoor 60 m champion and former double NCAA Champion Julien Alfred had run a new personal best of 10.78 s at the Racers Grand Prix to move to third on the season top list.

In the heats, Ta Lou-Smith ran the fastest time with 10.87 s to win her heat, with Fraser-Pryce tied with Daryll Neita for the next fastest in 10.92 s. In the semi-finals, Fraser-Pryce was unable to compete due to an undisclosed injury. Alfred had the fastest qualifying time with 10.84 s to win her semi-final, with Richardson and Clayton tying for the second-fastest time with 10.89 s.

In the final, Alfred had the fastest start, reaching the 10 m mark first. Next to her, Richardson was seventh at the same point. As Alfred expanded her lead across the next 40 m, a row of chasers formed across the track; with Mujinga Kambundji being second at the 50 m mark, Neita third and Jefferson narrowly fourth. Ta Lou-Smith pulled-up injured at the 40 m mark. Richardson finished quickly and crossed the 80 m mark in second-place behind Alfred. Her training-partner, Jefferson also finished quickly and was third at the same point ahead of Neita in fourth. Alfred ran a new personal best, 10.72; a national record and the first ever Olympic gold medal for St. Lucia. Her time moved her up to tie Ta Lou for the eighth-fastest woman of all time.

== Background ==
The women's 100 metres has been present on the Olympic athletics programme since 1928. The 100 metres is considered one of the blue ribbon events of the Olympics and is among the highest profile competitions at the games. It is the most prestigious 100 metres race at an elite level and is the shortest sprinting competition at the Olympics.

Global records before the 2024 Summer Olympics
| Record | Athlete (nation) | Time (s) | Location | Date |
|---|---|---|---|---|
| World record | Florence Griffith-Joyner (USA) | 10.49 | Indianapolis, United States | 16 July 1988 |
| Olympic record | Elaine Thompson-Herah (JAM) | 10.61 | Tokyo, Japan | 31 July 2021 |
| World leading | Sha'Carri Richardson (USA) | 10.71 | Eugene, United States | 22 June 2024 |

Area records before the 2024 Summer Olympics
| Area record | Athlete (nation) | Time (s) |
|---|---|---|
| Africa (records) | Marie-Josée Ta Lou (CIV) | 10.72 |
| Asia (records) | Li Xuemei (CHN) | 10.79 |
| Europe (records) | Christine Arron (FRA) | 10.73 |
| North, Central America and Caribbean (records) | Florence Griffith-Joyner (USA) | 10.49 WR |
| Oceania (records) | Zoe Hobbs (NZL) | 10.96 |
| South America (records) | Rosângela Santos (BRA) | 10.91 |

== Qualification ==
For the women's 100 metres event, the qualification period was between 1 July 2023 and 30 June 2024. 48 athletes qualified for the event, with a maximum of three athletes per nation, by running the entry standard of 11.07 seconds or faster or by their World Athletics Ranking for this event. Additionally, universality places were given to NOCs that had not qualified athletes in any other event.

== Results ==
=== Preliminary round ===
The preliminary round was held on 2 August, starting at 10:35 (UTC+2) in the morning. Qualification: First 3 in each heat (Q) and next 5 fastest (q) advance to round 1.

==== Heat 1 ====
| Rank | Lane | Athlete | Nation | Time | Notes |
|---|---|---|---|---|---|
| 1 | 4 | Natacha Ngoye | Republic of the Congo | 11.34 | Q |
| 2 | 5 | Alessandra Gasparelli | San Marino | 11.62 | Q |
| 3 | 8 | Xenia Hiebert | Paraguay | 11.77 | Q |
| 4 | 3 | Valentina Meredova | Turkmenistan | 12.01 | q, SB |
| 5 | 9 | Samira Awali Boubacar | Niger | 12.06 | PB |
| 6 | 2 | Silina Pha Aphay | Laos | 12.45 | SB |
| 7 | 6 | Sydney Francisco | Palau | 13.15 | |
| 8 | 7 | Salam Bouha Ahamdy | Mauritania | 13.71 | PB |
| | 1 | Lucia Morris | South Sudan | DNF | |
| | | | | Wind: 0.0 m/s | |

==== Heat 2 ====
| Rank | Lane | Athlete | Nation | Time | Notes |
|---|---|---|---|---|---|
| 1 | 7 | Trần Thị Nhi Yến | Vietnam | 11.81 | Q |
| 2 | 6 | Halle Hazzard | Grenada | 11.88 | Q |
| 3 | 4 | Zhang Bo-ya | Chinese Taipei | 11.99 | Q |
| 4 | 5 | Regine Tugade-Watson | Guam | 12.02 | q |
| 5 | 2 | Lika Kharchilava | Georgia | 12.37 | |
| 6 | 9 | Faiqa Riaz | Pakistan | 12.49 | PB |
| 7 | 8 | Mazoon Al-Alawi | Oman | 12.58 | SB |
| 8 | 3 | Filomenaleonisa Iakopo | American Samoa | 12.78 | NR |
| 9 | 1 | Mariam Kareem | United Arab Emirates | 13.26 | PB |
| | | | | Wind: 0.0 m/s | |

==== Heat 3 ====
| Rank | Lane | Athlete | Nation | Time | Notes |
|---|---|---|---|---|---|
| 1 | 9 | Gorete Semedo | São Tomé and Príncipe | 11.44 | Q |
| 2 | 6 | Guadalupe Torrez | Bolivia | 11.60 | Q |
| 3 | 2 | Leonie Beu | Papua New Guinea | 11.63 | Q, PB |
| 4 | 1 | María Carmona | Nicaragua | 11.88 | q, NR |
| 5 | 7 | Safiatou Acquaviva | Guinea | 11.97 | q, NR |
| 6 | 5 | Chloe David | Vanuatu | 12.44 | PB |
| 7 | 3 | Shahd Ashraf | Qatar | 12.53 | PB |
| 8 | 4 | Alisar Youssef | Syria | 12.93 | PB |
| 9 | 8 | Kimia Yousofi | Afghanistan | 13.42 | |
| | | | | Wind: +1.1 m/s | |

==== Heat 4 ====
| Rank | Lane | Athlete | Nation | Time | Notes |
|---|---|---|---|---|---|
| 1 | 9 | Zahria Allers-Liburd | Saint Kitts and Nevis | 11.73 | Q |
| 2 | 8 | Asimenye Simwaka | Malawi | 11.78 | Q |
| 3 | 6 | Mariandrée Chacón | Guatemala | 11.90 | Q |
| 4 | 1 | Georgiana Sesay | Sierra Leone | 11.99 | q |
| 5 | 5 | Naomi Akakpo | Togo | 12.34 | PB |
| 6 | 7 | Marie-Charlotte Gastaud | Monaco | 12.41 | PB |
| 7 | 2 | Sefora Ada Eto | Equatorial Guinea | 13.63 | PB |
| 8 | 4 | Temalini Manatoa | Tuvalu | 14.04 | PB |
| 9 | 3 | Sharon Firisua | Solomon Islands | 14.31 | PB |
| | | | | Wind: +0.2 m/s | |

=== Round 1 ===
Round 1 was held on 2 August, starting at 11:50 (UTC+2) in the morning. Qualification: First 3 in each heat (Q) and next 3 fastest (q) advance to the semi-finals.

==== Heat 1 ====
| Rank | Lane | Athlete | Nation | Time | Notes |
|---|---|---|---|---|---|
| 1 | 6 | Sha'Carri Richardson | United States | 10.94 | Q |
| 2 | 8 | Patrizia Van Der Weken | Luxembourg | 11.14 | Q |
| 3 | 7 | Bree Masters | Australia | 11.26 | Q, SB |
| 4 | 5 | Jacqueline Madogo | Canada | 11.27 | |
| 5 | 3 | Lorène Dorcas Bazolo | Portugal | 11.38 | |
| 6 | 9 | Tristan Evelyn | Barbados | 11.55 | |
| 7 | 4 | Trần Thị Nhi Yến | Vietnam | 11.79 | |
| 8 | 1 | Asimenye Simwaka | Malawi | 11.91 | |
| 9 | 2 | Thelma Davies | Liberia | 12.05 | |
| | | | | Wind: +0.1 m/s | |

==== Heat 2 ====
| Rank | Lane | Athlete | Nation | Time | Notes |
|---|---|---|---|---|---|
| 1 | 9 | Julien Alfred | Saint Lucia | 10.95 | Q |
| 2 | 6 | Zoe Hobbs | New Zealand | 11.08 | Q, SB |
| 3 | 2 | Zaynab Dosso | Italy | 11.30 | Q |
| 4 | 4 | Michelle-Lee Ahye | Trinidad and Tobago | 11.33 | |
| 5 | 8 | Yunisleidy García | Cuba | 11.37 | |
| 6 | 1 | Gorete Semedo | São Tomé and Príncipe | 11.43 | |
| 7 | 5 | Olivia Fotopoulou | Cyprus | 11.50 | |
| 8 | 7 | Destiny Smith-Barnett | Liberia | 11.99 | |
| 9 | 3 | Georgiana Sesay | Sierra Leone | 12.15 | |
| | | | | Wind: -0.8 m/s | |

==== Heat 3 ====
| Rank | Lane | Athlete | Nation | Time | Notes |
|---|---|---|---|---|---|
| 1 | 3 | Daryll Neita | Great Britain | 10.92 | Q, SB |
| 2 | 9 | Melissa Jefferson | United States | 10.96 | Q |
| 3 | 4 | Boglárka Takács | Hungary | 11.10 | Q, NR |
| 4 | 5 | Karolína Maňasová | Czech Republic | 11.11 | q, PB |
| 5 | 1 | Gémima Joseph | France | 11.13 | |
| 6 | 6 | Ella Connolly | Australia | 11.29 | |
| 7 | 8 | Magdalena Stefanowicz | Poland | 11.47 | |
| 8 | 2 | Guadalupe Torrez | Bolivia | 11.68 | |
| 9 | 7 | Zhang Bo-ya | Chinese Taipei | 11.88 | SB |
| | | | | Wind: +1.5 m/s | |

==== Heat 4 ====
| Rank | Lane | Athlete | Nation | Time | Notes |
|---|---|---|---|---|---|
| 1 | 4 | Audrey Leduc | Canada | 10.95 | Q, NR |
| 2 | 8 | Tia Clayton | Jamaica | 11.00 | Q |
| 3 | 1 | Imani Lansiquot | Great Britain | 11.10 | Q |
| 4 | 6 | Maboundou Koné | Ivory Coast | 11.17 | =PB |
| 5 | 5 | Julia Henriksson | Sweden | 11.26 | |
| 6 | 9 | Ge Manqi | China | 11.45 | |
| 7 | 2 | Alessandra Gasparelli | San Marino | 11.54 | NR |
| 8 | 3 | Vitória Cristina Rosa | Brazil | 12.02 | |
| 9 | 7 | Safiatou Acquaviva | Guinea | 12.07 | |
| | | | | Wind: +1.2 m/s | |

==== Heat 5 ====
| Rank | Lane | Athlete | Nation | Time | Notes |
|---|---|---|---|---|---|
| 1 | 3 | Ewa Swoboda | Poland | 10.99 | Q, SB |
| 2 | 2 | Dina Asher-Smith | Great Britain | 11.01 | Q |
| 3 | 5 | Rosemary Chukwuma | Nigeria | 11.26 | Q |
| 4 | 6 | Ana Carolina Azevedo | Brazil | 11.32 | |
| 5 | 7 | Géraldine Frey | Switzerland | 11.34 | |
| 6 | 4 | Ángela Tenorio | Ecuador | 11.35 | |
| 7 | 8 | Farzaneh Fasihi | Iran | 11.51 | |
| 8 | 1 | Leonie Beu | Papua New Guinea | 11.73 | |
| 9 | 9 | Mariandrée Chacón | Guatemala | 12.06 | |
| | | | | Wind: +1.0 m/s | |

==== Heat 6 ====
| Rank | Lane | Athlete | Nation | Time | Notes |
|---|---|---|---|---|---|
| 1 | 5 | Twanisha Terry | United States | 11.15 | Q |
| 2 | 3 | Shashalee Forbes | Jamaica | 11.19 | Q |
| 3 | 4 | Leah Bertrand | Trinidad and Tobago | 11.27 | Q |
| 4 | 1 | Salomé Kora | Switzerland | 11.35 | |
| 5 | 6 | Cecilia Tamayo-Garza | Mexico | 11.39 | |
| 6 | 8 | Viktória Forster | Slovakia | 11.44 | SB |
| 7 | 7 | Lotta Kemppinen | Finland | 11.56 | |
| 8 | 2 | Zahria Allers-Liburd | Saint Kitts and Nevis | 11.89 | |
| 9 | 9 | María Carmona | Nicaragua | 12.00 | |
| | | | | Wind: -0.4 m/s | |

==== Heat 7 ====
| Rank | Lane | Athlete | Nation | Time | Notes |
|---|---|---|---|---|---|
| 1 | 1 | Gina Bass-Bittaye | The Gambia | 11.01 | Q |
| 2 | 4 | Mujinga Kambundji | Switzerland | 11.05 | Q |
| 3 | 6 | Delphine Nkansa | Belgium | 11.20 | Q, =PB |
| 4 | 5 | Polyniki Emmanouilidou | Greece | 11.25 | |
| 5 | 7 | Rebekka Haase | Germany | 11.28 | |
| 6 | 3 | Tima Seikeseye Godbless | Nigeria | 11.33 | |
| 7 | 8 | Veronica Shanti Pereira | Singapore | 11.63 | |
| 8 | 2 | Halle Hazzard | Grenada | 11.70 | |
| 9 | 9 | Xenia Hiebert | Paraguay | 11.82 | |
| | | | | Wind: -0.2 m/s | |

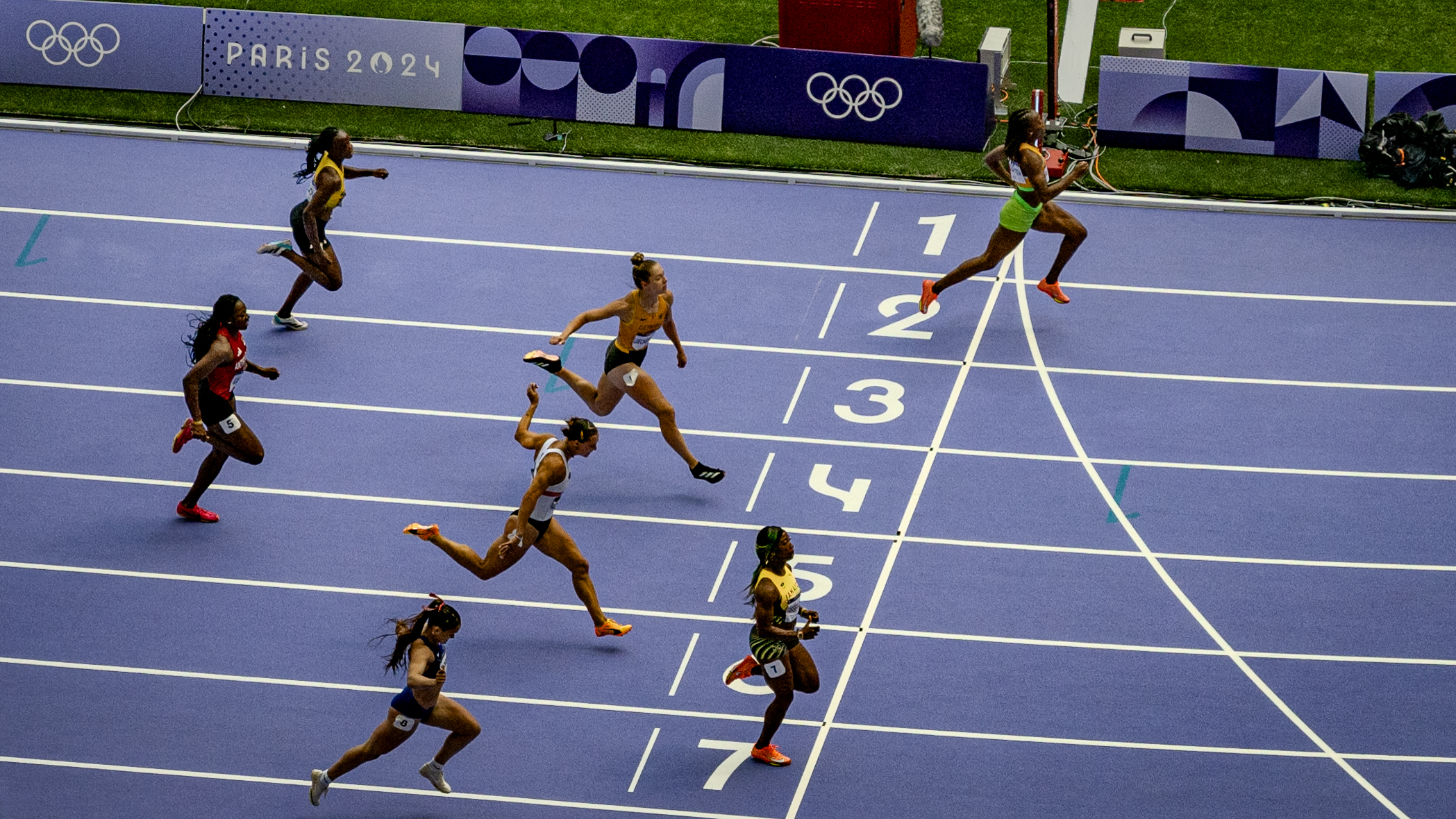
Heat 8

==== Heat 8 ====
| Rank | Lane | Athlete | Nation | Time | Notes |
|---|---|---|---|---|---|
| 1 | 2 | Marie-Josée Ta Lou-Smith | Ivory Coast | 10.87 | Q, SB |
| 2 | 7 | Shelly-Ann Fraser-Pryce | Jamaica | 10.92 | Q |
| 3 | 4 | Gina Lückenkemper | Germany | 11.08 | Q |
| 4 | 6 | Rani Rosius | Belgium | 11.10 | q, PB |
| 5 | 8 | Gladymar Torres | Puerto Rico | 11.12 | q, NR |
| 6 | 3 | Natacha Ngoye | Republic of the Congo | 11.36 | |
| 7 | 5 | Joella Lloyd | Antigua and Barbuda | 11.37 | |
| 8 | 1 | Regine Tugade-Watson | Guam | 11.87 | |
| 9 | 9 | Valentina Meredova | Turkmenistan | 11.95 | SB |
| | | | | Wind: +0.8 m/s | |

=== Semi-finals ===
The semi-finals were held on 3 August, starting at 19:50 (UTC+2) in the evening. Qualification: First 2 in each heat (Q) and next 2 fastest (q) advance to the final.

==== Heat 1 ====
| Rank | Lane | Athlete | Nation | Time | Notes |
|---|---|---|---|---|---|
| 1 | 4 | Melissa Jefferson | United States | 10.99 | Q |
| 2 | 7 | Marie Josée Ta Lou-Smith | Ivory Coast | 11.01 | Q |
| 3 | 8 | Mujinga Kambundji | Switzerland | 11.05 | q |
| 4 | 6 | Ewa Swoboda | Poland | 11.08 | |
| 5 | 5 | Dina Asher-Smith | Great Britain | 11.10 | |
| 6 | 3 | Shashalee Forbes | Jamaica | 11.20 | |
| 7 | 9 | Boglárka Takács | Hungary | 11.26 | |
| 8 | 2 | Rani Rosius | Belgium | 11.29 | |
| 9 | 1 | Zaynab Dosso | Italy | 11.34 | |
| | | | | Wind: +0.1 m/s | |

==== Heat 2 ====
| Rank | Lane | Athlete | Nation | Time | Notes |
|---|---|---|---|---|---|
| 1 | 6 | Julien Alfred | Saint Lucia | 10.84 | Q |
| 2 | 7 | Sha'Carri Richardson | United States | 10.89 | Q |
| 3 | 4 | Gina Mariam Bass Bittaye | The Gambia | 11.10 | |
| 4 | 8 | Patrizia van der Weken | Luxembourg | 11.13 | |
| 5 | 3 | Imani-Lara Lansiquot | Great Britain | 11.21 | |
| 6 | 9 | Gladymar Torres | Puerto Rico | 11.33 | |
| 7 | 2 | Bree Masters | Australia | 11.34 | |
| 8 | 1 | Rosemary Chukwuma | Nigeria | 11.39 | |
| | 5 | Shelly-Ann Fraser-Pryce | Jamaica | DNS | |
| | | | | Wind: -0.1 m/s | |

==== Heat 3 ====
| Rank | Lane | Athlete | Nation | Time | Notes |
|---|---|---|---|---|---|
| 1 | 6 | Tia Clayton | Jamaica | 10.89 | Q |
| 2 | 4 | Daryll Neita | Great Britain | 10.97 | Q |
| 3 | 7 | Twanisha Terry | United States | 11.07 | q |
| 4 | 8 | Gina Lückenkemper | Germany | 11.09 | |
| 5 | 5 | Audrey Leduc | Canada | 11.10 | |
| 6 | 3 | Zoe Hobbs | New Zealand | 11.13 | |
| 7 | 9 | Delphine Nkansa | Belgium | 11.28 | |
| 8 | 2 | Karolína Maňasová | Czech Republic | 11.35 | |
| 9 | 1 | Leah Bertrand | Trinidad and Tobago | 11.37 | |
| | | | | Wind: +0.2 m/s | |

=== Final ===
The final was held on 3 August, starting at 21:20 (UTC+2) in the evening.

| Rank | Lane | Athlete | Nation | Time | Notes |
|---|---|---|---|---|---|
| 1st place, gold medalist(s) | 6 | Julien Alfred | Saint Lucia | 10.72 | NR |
| 2nd place, silver medalist(s) | 7 | Sha'Carri Richardson | United States | 10.87 | |
| 3rd place, bronze medalist(s) | 5 | Melissa Jefferson | United States | 10.92 | |
| 4 | 8 | Daryll Neita | Great Britain | 10.96 | |
| 5 | 9 | Twanisha Terry | United States | 10.97 | |
| 6 | 2 | Mujinga Kambundji | Switzerland | 10.99 | |
| 7 | 4 | Tia Clayton | Jamaica | 11.04 | |
| 8 | 3 | Marie Josée Ta Lou-Smith | Ivory Coast | 13.84 | |
