= Saint Lucia at the 2012 Summer Olympics =

- IOC code: LCA
- NOC: Saint Lucia Olympic Committee
- Website: www.slunoc.org

in London
- Competitors: 4 in 3 sports
- Flag bearer: Levern Spencer
- Medals: Gold 0 Silver 0 Bronze 0 Total 0

Summer Olympics appearances (overview)
- 1996; 2000; 2004; 2008; 2012; 2016; 2020; 2024; 2028

Saint Lucia competed at the 2012 Summer Olympics in London, from 27 July to 12 August 2012. This was the nation's fifth consecutive appearance at the Olympics.

Four athletes from Saint Lucia were selected to the team, competing only in track and field, sailing, and swimming. The Saint Lucian team also tied its record for the number of athletes with Beijing at a single Olympics. High jumper Levern Spencer reprised her role to be the nation's flag bearer at the opening ceremony for the second time. Saint Lucia, however, took 12 years after this Olympics to finally clinch their first Olympic medals

== History ==
Throughout the 17th and 18th centuries possession of Saint Lucia was contested between France and England. Possession of Saint Lucia swapped hands between the two nations 14 times. Saint Lucia was finally ceded by the French to the English in 1814. Saint Lucia was granted self governance in 1967, and then independence in 1979.

Saint Lucia formed its National Olympic Committee in 1987. Saint Lucia's NOC was officially recognized by the International Olympic Committee on 24 September, 1993. As of 2012 Saint Lucia had competed four Olympics since their debut at the 1996 Summer Olympics in Atlanta, United States.

== Athletics ==
Athletes from Saint Lucia have so far achieved qualifying standards in the following athletics events (up to a maximum of 3 athletes in each event at the 'A' Standard, and 1 at the 'B' Standard):

Saint Lucia was represented by one male and one female athlete at the 2012 Summer Olympics in athletics. Darvin Edwards represented the nation in the men's high jump while Levern Spencer represented the nation in the women's high jump. This was the first Olympic appearance for Edwards, and the second appearance Spencer who had previously competed at the 2008 Summer Olympics in Beijing, China.

Key

- Note–Ranks given for track events are within the athlete's heat only
- Q = Qualified for the next round
- q = Qualified for the next round as a fastest loser or, in field events, by position without achieving the qualifying target
- NR = National record
- N/A = Round not applicable for the event
- Bye = Athlete not required to compete in round
- NM - No mark

Men

Athlete	Event	Qualification		Final	
Athlete	Event	Distance	Position	Distance	Position
Darvin Edwards	High jump	NM	—	did not advance	

Women

Athlete	Event	Qualification		Final	
Athlete	Event	Distance	Position	Distance	Position
Levern Spencer	High jump	1.90	19	did not advance	

== Sailing ==
Saint Lucia was represented by one female athlete at the 2012 Olympics in sailing, Beth Lygoe. This was Lygoe's first Olympic appearance.

Women

Athlete	Event	Race											Net points	Final rank
Athlete	Event	1	2	3	4	5	6	7	8	9	10	M*	Net points	Final rank
Beth Lygoe	Laser Radial	38	37	28	38	~~39~~	29	37	37	26	23	EL	293	37

M = Medal race; EL = Did not advance

== Swimming ==
Saint Lucia was represented by one female athlete at the 2012 Olympics in swimming, Danielle Beaubrun. This was Beaubrun's second appearance at the olympic, Beaubrun previously competed at the 2008 Summer Olympics in Beijing, China.

Women

Athlete	Event	Heat		Semifinal		Final	
Athlete	Event	Time	Rank	Time	Rank	Time	Rank
Danielle Beaubrun	100 m breaststroke	1:11.12	36	did not advance			

== See also ==
- Saint Lucia at the 2011 Pan American Games
