= Saint Lucia at the 2000 Summer Olympics =

- IOC code: LCA
- NOC: Saint Lucia Olympic Committee
- Website: www.slunoc.org

in Sydney
- Competitors: 5 in 2 sports
- Flag bearer: Dominic Johnson
- Medals: Gold 0 Silver 0 Bronze 0 Total 0

Summer Olympics appearances (overview)
- 1996; 2000; 2004; 2008; 2012; 2016; 2020; 2024

Saint Lucia competed at the 2000 Summer Olympics which were held in Sydney, Australia from 13 September to 1 October. Saint Lucia sent five athletes to the 2000 Summer Olympics, Ron Promesse, Dominic Johnson, Vernetta Lesforis, Jamie Peterkin, and Sherri Henry. While none of the athletes form Saint Lucia won an Olympic medal at the 2000 Summer Olympics, Jamie Promesse placed first in his heat for the men's 50-metre freestyle.

== History ==
In the 17th and 18th centuries, Great Britain and France had a territorial dispute over Saint Lucia. Control of Saint Lucia passed between British and French possession an estimated 14 separate times. The nation finally ended up in the United Kingdom's possession in 1814. The United Kingdom granted Saint Lucia self rule in 1967, and eventually granted the nation independence in 1979.

Saint Lucia formed its National Olympic Committee in 1987, and gained international recognition by the International Olympic Committee on 24 September 1993. Saint Lucia previously competed in the 1996 Summer Olympics.

== Competitors ==
The following is the list of number of competitors in the Games.

Sport	Men	Women	Total
Athletics	2	1	3
Swimming	1	1	2
Total	3	2	5

== Athletics ==
Saint Lucia was represented by two male athletes and one female athlete at the 2000 Summer Olympics in athletics: Ron Promesse, Dominic Johnson, and Vernetta Lesforis. This was the first Olympic appearance for both Promesse and Lesforis. This was the second Olympic appearance for Johnson who had previously competed in the 1996 Summer Olympics.

Ron Promesse competed in the men's 100-metre, but did not finish the event. The medals in the event went to athletes from the United States, Trinidad and Tobago, and Barbados.

Dominic Johnson competed in the men's pole vault, placing at 26th in the standings, in a three-way tie along with Pavel Gerasimov and Chad Harting. The medals in the event went to athletes from the United States, and Russia.

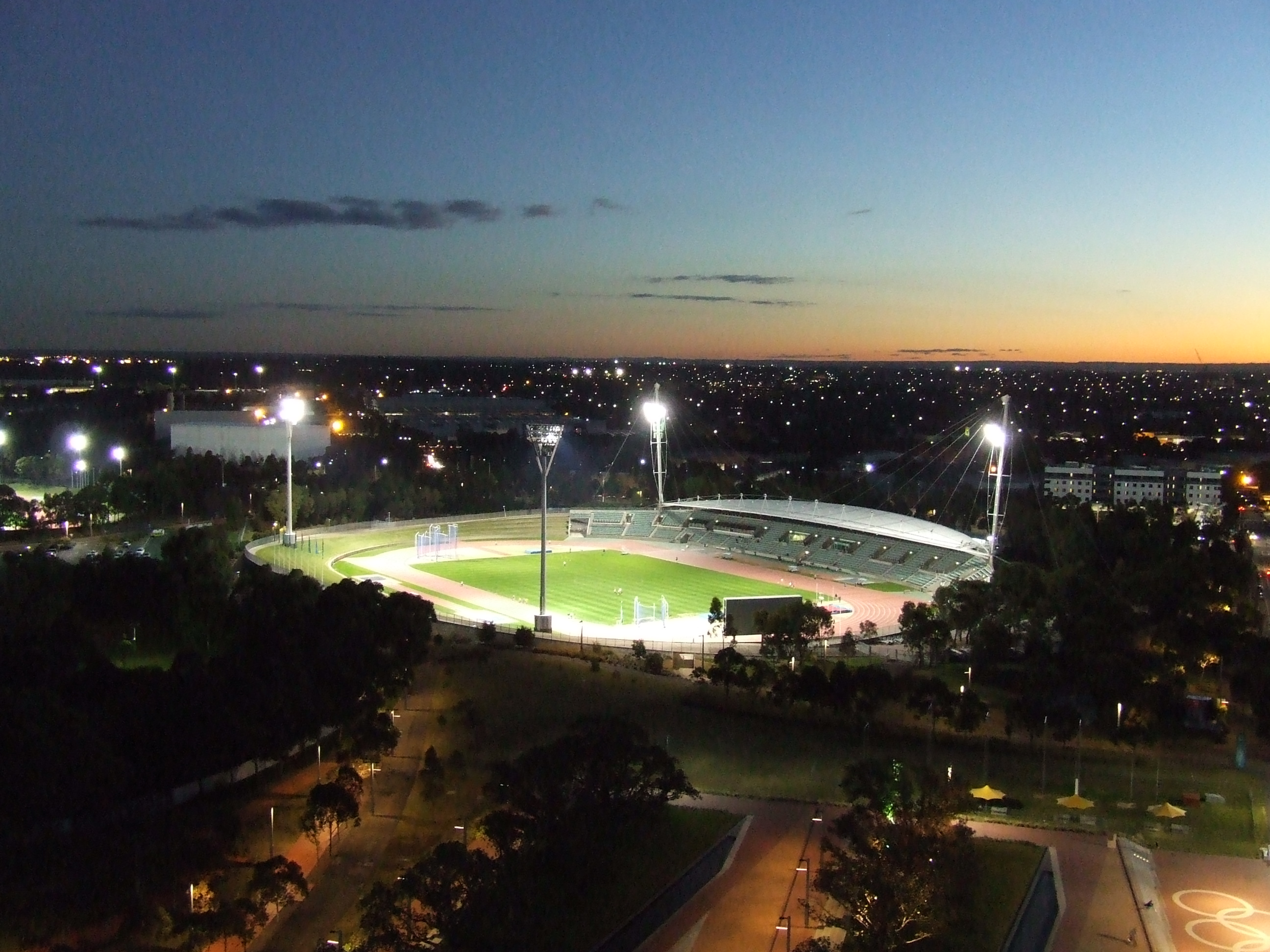
Promesse, Johnson and Lesforis all competed at Stadium Australia where the athletics events for the 2000 Summer Olympics were held.

Vernetta Lesforis competed in the women's 400-metre, finishing sixth in her heat and failed to advance to the next round. The medals in the event went to athletes from Australia, Jamaica, and Great Britain.

=== Key ===
- Note–Ranks given for track events are within the athlete's heat only
- Q = Qualified for the next round
- q = Qualified for the next round as a fastest loser or, in field events, by position without achieving the qualifying target
- NR = National record
- N/A = Round not applicable for the event
- Bye = Athlete not required to compete in round

=== Men ===
Athlete	Event	Heat		Quarterfinal		Semifinal		Final	
Athlete	Event	Result	Rank	Result	Rank	Result	Rank	Result	Rank
Ron Promesse	100 m	did not finish		did not advance					

Athlete	Event	Qualification		Final	
Athlete	Event	Distance	Position	Distance	Position
Dominic Johnson	Pole vault	5.40	26	did not advance	

=== Women ===
Athlete	Event	Heat		Quarterfinal		Semifinal		Final	
Athlete	Event	Result	Rank	Result	Rank	Result	Rank	Result	Rank
Vernetta Lesforis	400 m	54.67	6	did not advance					

== Swimming ==
Saint Lucia was represented by one male athlete and one female athlete in swimming at the 2000 Summer Olympics, Jamie Peterkin and Sherri Henry, this was the first appearance at the olympics for both Peterkin and Henry. Jamie Peterkin competed in the men's 50-metre freestyle, finishing with a time of 25.33. Peterkin placed first in his heat, however he failed to advance to the next round. The medals in the event went to athletes from the United States and the Netherlands.

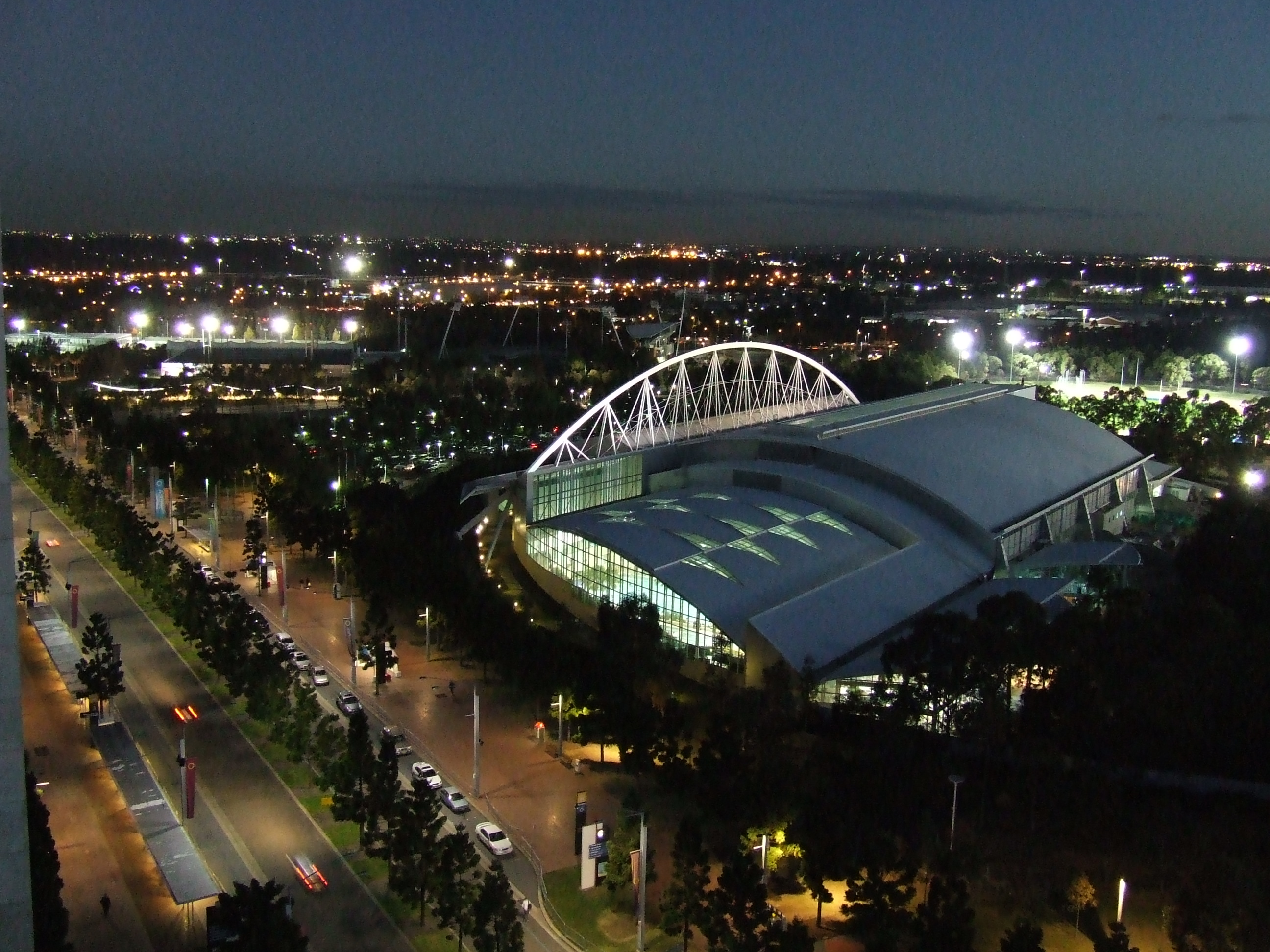
Peterkin and Henry competed at the Sydney International Aquatic Centre during the 2000 Summer Olympics.

Sherri Henry competed in the women's 50-metre freestyle, finishing with a time of 28.81. Henry placed fourth in her heat, however she failed to advance to the next round. The medals in the event went to athletes from the Netherlands, Sweden, and the United States.

=== Men ===
Athlete	Event	Heat		Semifinal		Final	
Athlete	Event	Time	Rank	Time	Rank	Time	Rank
Jamie Peterkin	50 m freestyle	25.33	1	did not advance			

=== Women ===
Athlete	Event	Heat		Semifinal		Final	
Athlete	Event	Time	Rank	Time	Rank	Time	Rank
Sherri Henry	50 m freestyle	28.81	4	did not advance			
