= Athletics at the 2024 Summer Olympics – Women's 200 metres =

Women's 200 metres at the Games of the XXXIII Olympiad
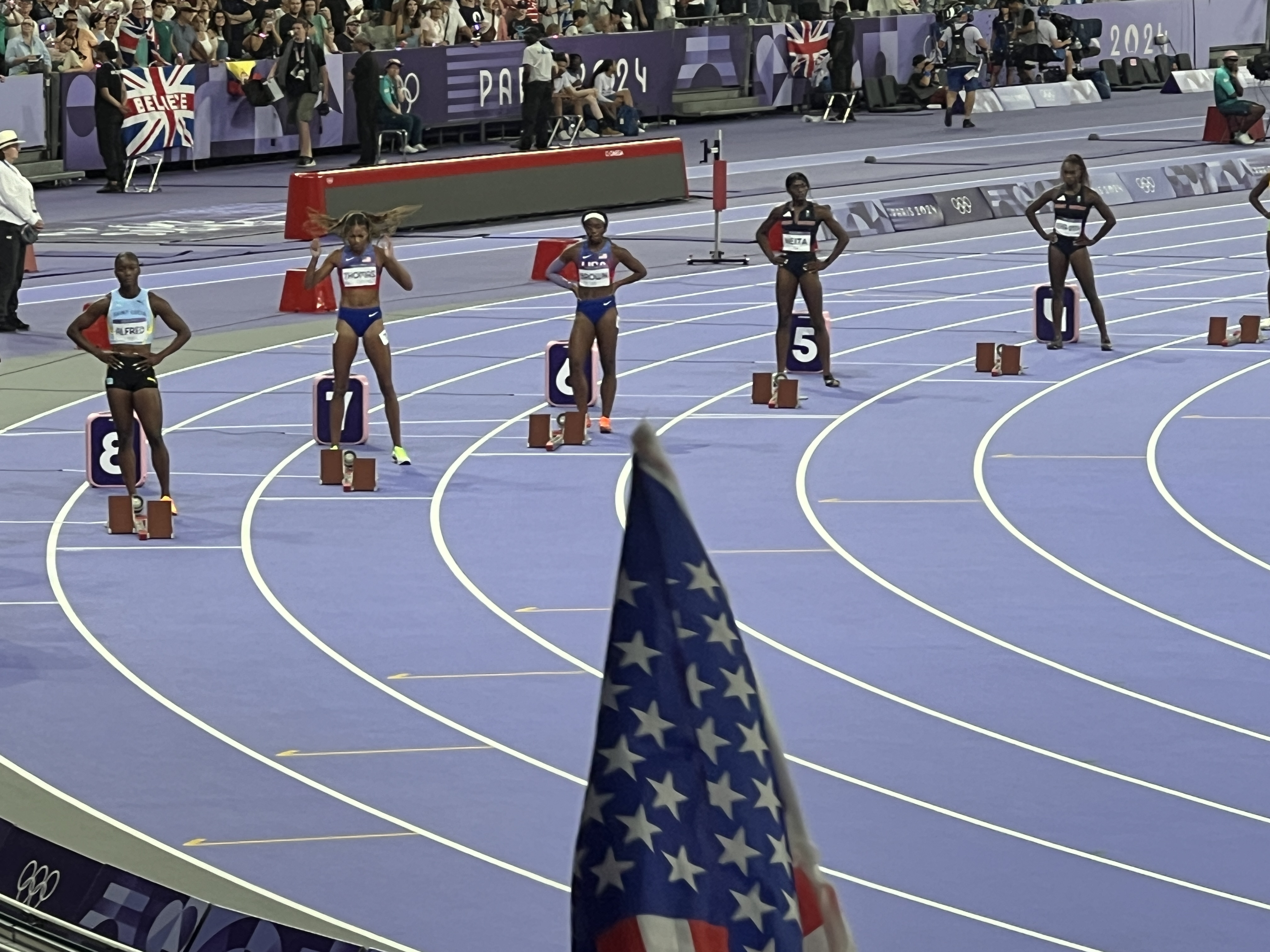
- The field in the women's 200 meters final, 2024 Olympics
- Venue: Stade de France, Paris, France
- Dates: 4 August 2024 (heats); 5 August 2024 (repechage round); 5 August 2024 (semi-finals); 6 August 2024 (final)
- Winning time: 21.83

Medalists
1st place, gold medalist(s)		Gabrielle Thomas	United States
2nd place, silver medalist(s)		Julien Alfred	Saint Lucia
3rd place, bronze medalist(s)		Brittany Brown	United States

Official Video

The women's 200 metres at the 2024 Summer Olympics was held in four rounds at the Stade de France in Paris, France, between 4 and 6 August 2024. This was the twentieth time that the women's 200 metres was contested at the Summer Olympics. A total of 48 athletes were able to qualify for the event by entry standard or ranking.

== Summary ==
Reigning Olympic champion Elaine Thompson-Herah was not able to defend her Olympic titles from 2016 and 2020, as an achilles tendon injury forced her to withdraw from the Jamaican Olympic trials, thus not allowing her to qualify for these games. Silver medalist Christine Mboma, with a previously noted elevated testosterone level, hasn't competed since 2022. Double World Championship Gold Medalist Shericka Jackson was injured a few weeks before the Olympics and could not start. 2022 Silver medalist Shelly-Ann Fraser-Pryce was injured in the heats of the 100m, as was Marie Josée Ta Lou-Smith, fourth in 2016. 2023 bronze medalist Sha'Carri Richardson placed 4th in the 200m at the US Olympic Trials and did not qualify.

Participating was 2020 Olympic bronze medalist/2023 World silver medalist Gabrielle Thomas, who is also the season leader, the entire 2019 World podium including Dina Asher-Smith (also the 2022 bronze medalist), Brittany Brown and Mujinga Kambundji, 100m champion Julien Alfred, whose stronger event is the 200m and current NCAA double champion McKenzie Long.

Thomas had the fastest time in the semis, 21.86. Next fastest was Alfred, who ran an eased up 21.98 almost jogging across the finish line ahead of Favour Ofili, who finishes third in 22.02. Brown won the remaining semi in 22.12.

In the final, Alfred had a slight edge at the start, but Thomas made up the difference in the first 50m. As they finished the turn, it was Thomas in the lead, and a row of competitors across the track behind her. Asher-Smith had a slight edge over Brown and Alfred. The straightaway was Thomas' strong point, and she pulled away for a clear gold. Behind her, Alfred separated from the group for a clear margin for silver. In the final 30m, Brown was able to edge ahead of Asher-Smith to take bronze by 0.02.

== Background ==
The women's 200 metres has been present on the Olympic athletics programme since 1948.

Global records before the 2024 Summer Olympics
Record	Athlete (nation)	Time (s)	Location	Date
World record	Florence Griffith-Joyner (USA)	21.34	Seoul, South Korea	29 September 1988
Olympic record	Florence Griffith-Joyner (USA)	21.34	Seoul, South Korea	29 September 1988
World leading	Gabrielle Thomas (USA)	21.78	Eugene, United States	22 June 2024

Area records before the 2024 Summer Olympics
Area record	Athlete (nation)	Time (s)
Africa (records)	Christine Mboma (NAM)	21.78
Asia (records)	Li Xuemei (CHN)	22.01
Europe (records)	Dafne Schippers (NED)	21.63
North, Central America and Caribbean (records)	Florence Griffith-Joyner (USA)	21.34 WR
Oceania (records)	Melinda Gainsford (AUS)	22.23
South America (records)	Vitória Cristina Rosa (BRA)	22.47

== Qualification ==
For the women's 200 metres event, the qualification period is between 1 July 2023 and 30 June 2024. 48 athletes are able to qualify for the event, with a maximum of three athletes per nation, by running the entry standard of 22.57 seconds or faster or by their World Athletics Ranking for this event.

== Results ==
=== Heats ===
The heats were held on 4 August, starting at 10:55 (UTC+2) in the morning.

==== Heat 1 ====
Rank	Lane	Athlete	Nation	Time	Notes
1	4	Julien Alfred	Saint Lucia	22.41	Q
2	5	Gémima Joseph	France	22.72	Q
3	6	Julia Henriksson	Sweden	22.79	Q, NR
4	9	Torrie Lewis	Australia	22.89	PB
5	7	Lorène Dorcas Bazolo	Portugal	23.10	SB
6	2	Léonie Pointet	Switzerland	23.42	
7	3	Olga Safronova	Kazakhstan	23.58	
	8	Marie-Josée Ta Lou-Smith	Ivory Coast	DNS	
				Wind: +1.4 m/s	

==== Heat 2 ====
Rank	Lane	Athlete	Nation	Time	Notes
1	5	Gabrielle Thomas	United States	22.20	Q
2	6	Niesha Burgher	Jamaica	22.54	Q
3	3	Mujinga Kambundji	Switzerland	22.75	Q
4	8	Jacqueline Madogo	Canada	22.78	PB
5	4	Anahí Suárez	Ecuador	23.33	
6	7	Dalia Kaddari	Italy	23.49	
7	2	Cecilia Tamayo-Garza	Mexico	23.65	
				Wind: 0.0 m/s	

==== Heat 3 ====
Rank	Lane	Athlete	Nation	Time	Notes
1	5	Daryll Neita	Great Britain	22.39	Q
2	9	Tasa Jiya	Netherlands	22.74	Q
3	3	Helene Parisot	France	22.99	Q
4	7	Nicole Caicedo	Ecuador	23.18	
5	2	Nora Lindahl	Sweden	23.33	
6	6	Martyna Kotwiła	Poland	23.43	
7	8	Anna Bongiorni	Italy	23.49	
	4	Shericka Jackson	Jamaica	DNS	
				Wind: 0.0 m/s	

==== Heat 4 ====
Rank	Lane	Athlete	Nation	Time	Notes
1	9	Mckenzie Long	United States	22.55	Q
2	7	Jessika Gbai	Ivory Coast	22.61	Q
3	3	Audrey Leduc	Canada	22.88	Q
4	2	Jaël Bestué	Spain	23.17	
5	6	Krystsina Tsimanouskaya	Poland	23.30	
6	5	Mia Gross	Australia	23.36	
7	4	Aimara Nazareno	Ecuador	23.52	
8	8	Lorraine Martins	Brazil	23.68	
				Wind: 0.0 m/s	

==== Heat 5 ====
Rank	Lane	Athlete	Nation	Time	Notes
1	7	Brittany Brown	United States	22.38	
2	2	Lanae-Tava Thomas	Jamaica	22.70	
3	3	Bianca Williams	Great Britain	22.77	
4	8	Polyniki Emmanouilidou	Greece	23.06	
5	5	Olivia Fotopoulou	Cyprus	23.07	
6	4	Boglárka Takács	Hungary	23.16	
7	9	Imke Vervaet	Belgium	23.20	
8	6	Veronica Shanti Pereira	Singapore	23.21	
				Wind: +0.2 m/s	

==== Heat 6 ====
Rank	Lane	Athlete	Nation	Time	Notes
1	2	Favour Ofili	Nigeria	22.24	Q, SB
2	8	Dina Asher-Smith	Great Britain	22.28	Q
3	7	Gina Mariam Bass-Bittaye	The Gambia	22.84	Q, SB
4	3	Maboundou Koné	Ivory Coast	22.87	SB
5	5	Adaejah Hodge	British Virgin Islands	23.00	
6	4	Ida Karstoft	Denmark	23.01	
7	9	Yuting Li	China	23.31	
8	6	Ana Azevedo	Brazil	23.37	
				Wind: +0.5 m/s	

=== Repechage round ===
The repechage rounds were held on 5 August, starting at 12:50 (UTC+2) in the afternoon.

==== Heat 1 ====
Rank	Lane	Athlete	Nation	Time	Notes
1	8	Jacqueline Madogo	Canada	22.58	Q, PB
2	7	Adaejah Hodge	British Virgin Islands	22.94	q
3	6	Polyniki Emmanouilidou	Greece	22.99	q
4	4	Lorène Dorcas Bazolo	Portugal	23.08	SB
5	5	Aimara Nazareno	Ecuador	23.35	
6	2	Ana Azevedo	Brazil	23.44	
7	3	Veronica Shanti Pereira	Singapore	23.45	
				Wind: +0.6 m/s	

==== Heat 2 ====
Rank	Lane	Athlete	Nation	Time	Notes
1	4	Maboundou Koné	Ivory Coast	22.89	Q
2	8	Boglárka Takács	Hungary	23.05	
3	3	Li Yuting	China	23.24	
4	5	Martyna Kotwiła	Poland	23.50	
5	7	Anahí Suárez	Ecuador	23.54	
6	6	Lorraine Martins	Brazil	23.82	
	3	Dalia Kaddari	Italy	DNS	
				Wind: +0.6 m/s	

==== Heat 3 ====
Rank	Lane	Athlete	Nation	Time	Notes
1	8	Olivia Fotopoulou	Cyprus	22.92	Q, =SB
2	5	Krystsina Tsimanouskaya	Poland	23.01	
3	7	Nicole Caicedo	Ecuador	23.04	
4	4	Mia Gross	Australia	23.34	
5	6	Cecilia Tamayo-Garza	Mexico	23.49	
	2	Anna Bongiorni	Italy	DNS	
	3	Ida Karstoft	Denmark	DNS	
				Wind: -0.4 m/s	

==== Heat 4 ====
Rank	Lane	Athlete	Nation	Time	Notes
1	2	Torrie Lewis	Australia	23.08	Q
2	3	Jaël Bestué	Spain	23.22	
3	7	Imke Vervaet	Belgium	23.33	
4	6	Léonie Pointet	Switzerland	23.37	
5	4	Nora Lindahl	Sweden	23.51	
6	5	Olga Safronova	Kazakhstan	23.70	
				Wind: -0.9 m/s	

=== Semi-finals ===
The semi-finals were held on 5 August, starting at 20:45 (UTC+2) in the evening.

==== Heat 1 ====
Rank	Lane	Athlete	Nation	Time	Notes
1	7	Julien Alfred	Saint Lucia	21.98	Q
2	6	Favour Ofili	Nigeria	22.05	Q, SB
3	8	McKenzie Long	United States	22.30	q
4	9	Bianca Williams	Great Britain	22.58	SB
5	3	Maboundou Koné	Ivory Coast	22.65	SB
6	5	Audrey Leduc	Canada	22.68	
7	4	Gémima Joseph	France	22.69	
8	2	Adaejah Hodge	British Virgin Islands	22.70	
				Wind: 0.0 m/s	

==== Heat 2 ====
Rank	Lane	Athlete	Nation	Time	Notes
1	8	Gabrielle Thomas	United States	21.86	Q
2	7	Dina Asher-Smith	Great Britain	22.31	Q
3	5	Helene Parisot	France	22.55	PB
4	4	Mujinga Kambundji	Switzerland	22.63	
5	6	Niesha Burgher	Jamaica	22.64	
6	9	Tasa Jiya	Netherlands	22.81 (.801)	
7	3	Jacqueline Madogo	Canada	22.81 (.807)	
8	2	Polyniki Emmanouilidou	Greece	23.18	
				Wind: +0.2 m/s	

==== Heat 3 ====
Rank	Lane	Athlete	Nation	Time	Notes
1	7	Brittany Brown	United States	22.12	Q
2	6	Daryll Neita	Great Britain	22.24	Q
3	8	Jessika Gbai	Ivory Coast	22.36	q, PB
4	5	Gina Mariam Bass-Bittaye	The Gambia	22.66	SB
5	9	Lanae-Tava Thomas	Jamaica	22.77	
6	4	Julia Henriksson	Sweden	22.88	
7	3	Torrie Lewis	Australia	22.92	
8	2	Olivia Fotopoulou	Cyprus	22.98	
				Wind: +0.1 m/s	

=== Final ===
The final was held on 6 August, starting at 21:40 (UTC+2) in the evening.

Rank	Lane	Athlete	Nation	Time	Notes
1st place, gold medalist(s)	7	Gabrielle Thomas	United States	21.83	
2nd place, silver medalist(s)	8	Julien Alfred	Saint Lucia	22.08	
3rd place, bronze medalist(s)	6	Brittany Brown	United States	22.20	
4	4	Dina Asher-Smith	Great Britain	22.22	
5	5	Daryll Neita	Great Britain	22.23	
6	9	Favour Ofili	Nigeria	22.24	
7	2	McKenzie Long	United States	22.42	
8	3	Jessika Gbai	Ivory Coast	22.70	
Source:				Wind: -0.6 m/s	
