= Saint Lucia at the 2008 Summer Olympics =

- IOC code: LCA
- NOC: Saint Lucia Olympic Committee
- Website: www.slunoc.org

in Beijing
- Competitors: 4 in 2 sports
- Flag bearer: Levern Spencer
- Medals: Gold 0 Silver 0 Bronze 0 Total 0

Summer Olympics appearances (overview)
- 1996; 2000; 2004; 2008; 2012; 2016; 2020; 2024; 2028

Saint Lucia sent a delegation to compete at the 2008 Summer Olympics in Beijing, China. The 2008 Saint Lucian team included four athletes that competed in two sports: swimming and athletics. Of these four athletes, Danielle Beaubrun, at age 18, was the youngest of the competitors. Dominic Johnson, at age 32, was the oldest, and was the only man sent as part of the 2008 delegation; additionally, Johnson was the only Saint Lucian athlete in the 2008 delegation who had previously participated in the Olympics.

None of the four athletes advanced past the qualifying stages, and thus did not win any medals. Evans ranked thirtieth overall in the qualifying round for javelin; Johnson also ranked thirtieth overall in the pole vault qualifying round; and Spencer ranked twenty-seventh in the qualifying round for high jump. Additionally, Beaubrun ranked forty-second in the swimming qualifying stages.

== Background ==
The Saint Lucia Olympic Committee sent President Richard Peterkin, Minister of Youth and Sports Lenard Montoute, Chief de Mission Alfred Emmanuel, Coach Henry Bailey, and Coach Karen Beaubrun to Beijing alongside the four-person athletic delegation. Saint Lucia was the 67th nation in line at the 2008 Summer Olympics opening ceremony, in which high jumper Levern Spencer was the flagbearer. Saint Lucians were unable to view the 7:00 am opening ceremony because of issues with the local cable provider.

== Athletics ==
Three of Saint Lucia's four athletes competed in athletics: Dominic Johnson, Lavern Spencer, and Erma-Gene Evans. Johnson, at age 32, was the oldest of Saint Lucia's athletes to participate in the 2008 Summer Olympics.

Erma-Gene Evans participated in athletics as a javelin thrower. The 2008 Summer Olympics was her Olympic debut. Evans moved forward through two rounds after qualifying under the B standard during her event on 18 August 2008, but did not rank in the third qualifying round. With a best mark distance of 56.27, Evans ranked thirtieth overall. She did not advance.

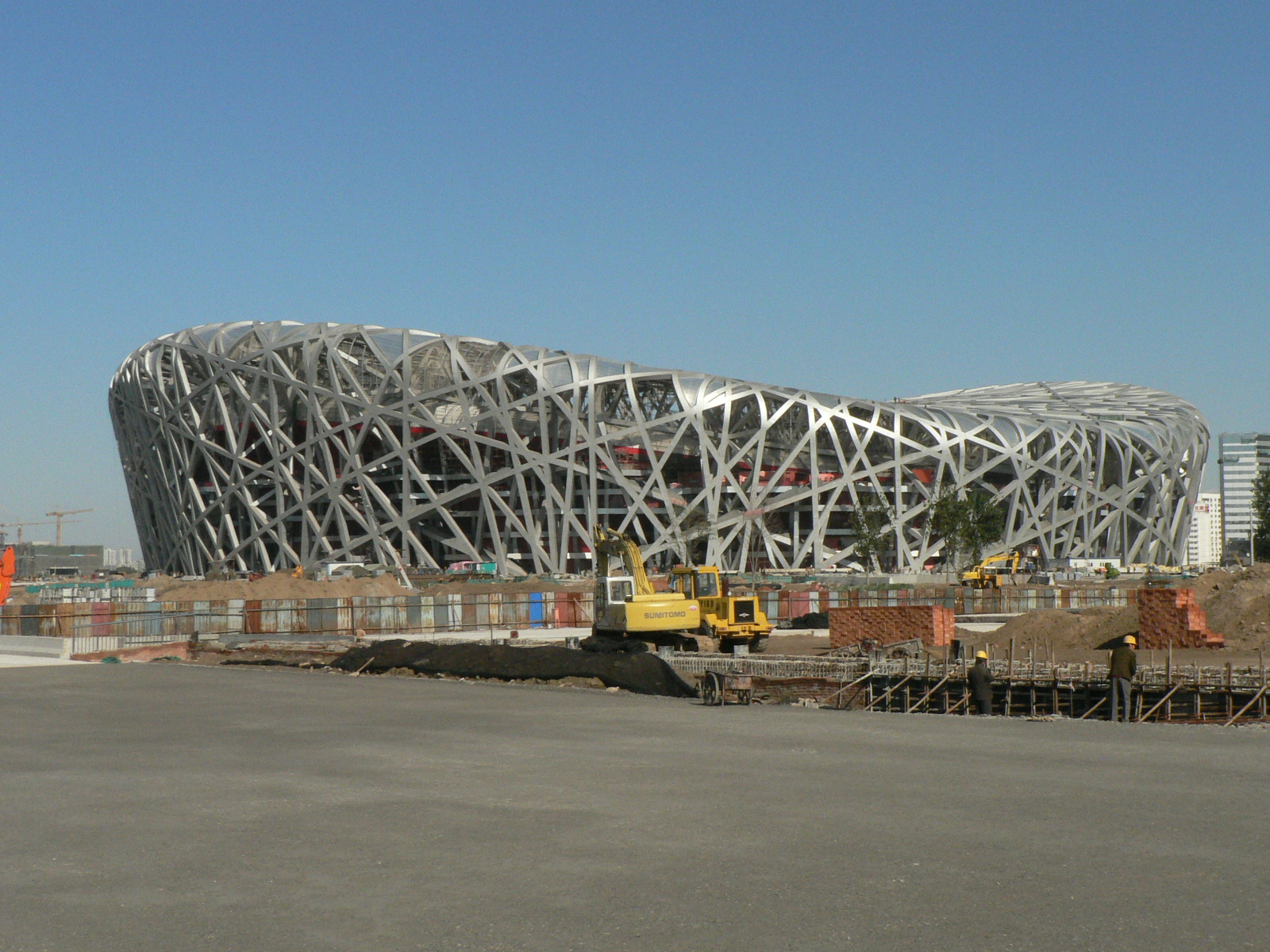
The Beijing National Stadium, where track and field (athletics) events took place.

Dominic Johnson participated in athletics as a pole vaulter, returning to the Olympics for his third time; Johnson had previously participated as a pole vaulter (and, at one time, a relay runner) on behalf of Saint Lucia in the 2000 Summer Olympics and 1996 Summer Olympics. Johnson flew to San Diego days before the competition cutoff and made the qualifying preliminary height for the Olympics shortly after winning a silver medal at the Central American and Caribbean Championships in Cali, Colombia. Johnson's event took place on 20 August 2008. With a height of 5.30 metres, Johnson did not qualify, although he tied for seventeenth place in his qualifying group. As such, he did not advance. Johnson tied with the Czech pole vaulter Štěpán Janáček for thirtieth place overall.

Levern Spencer participated in athletics as a high jumper, making her first appearance in the Olympics. Spencer trained with Coach Wayne Norton of the University of Georgia to hone her skills in the time preceding her performance in the Olympics. Levern Spencer's personal best time has been compared to medal winners in the event from the 2004 Summer Olympics. Spencer's best height cleared was 1.85, placing fourteenth in Qualifying Group B. However, during her event on 20 August 2008, Spencer placed twenty-seventh overall, and did not advance.

Men

Athlete	Event	Qualification		Final	
Athlete	Event	Distance	Position	Distance	Position
Dominic Johnson	Pole vault	5.30	30	Did not advance	

Women

Athlete	Event	Qualification		Final	
Athlete	Event	Distance	Position	Distance	Position
Erma-Gene Evans	Javelin throw	56.27	30	Did not advance	
Levern Spencer	High jump	1.85	27	Did not advance	

Key

- Note–Ranks given for track events are within the athlete's heat only
- Q = Qualified for the next round
- q = Qualified for the next round as a fastest loser or, in field events, by position without achieving the qualifying target
- NR = National record
- N/A = Round not applicable for the event
- Bye = Athlete not required to compete in round

== Swimming ==
Danielle Beaubrun was the only Saint Lucian swimmer to participate in the Beijing Olympics. She was the youngest member of the Saint Lucian delegation, at age 18. The 2008 Summer Olympics served as Beaubrun's Olympic debut. Beaubrun did not initially qualify for Olympic standards. However, because Saint Lucia had no naturally qualifying swimmers, the country was invited by FINA to send two swimmers to the Olympics, granted the swimmer had participated in the 2007 World Championships. Beaubrun met this criterion, and was selected for this reason. At the time, Beaubrun was enrolled at The Bolles School in Jacksonville, Florida and trained with coach Sergio Lopez.

The event in which Beaubrun participated was the 100 meter breaststroke. This event took place on 10 August 2008. In the second heat of the qualifying round, Beaubrun scored third, with a time of 1:12.85. However, overall, Danielle Beaubrun ranked forty-second, and, as a result, did not advance.

Women

Athlete	Event	Heat		Semifinal		Final	
Athlete	Event	Time	Rank	Time	Rank	Time	Rank
Danielle Beaubrun	100 m breaststroke	1:12.85	42	Did not advance			

== See also ==
- Saint Lucia at the 2007 Pan American Games
- Saint Lucia at the 2010 Central American and Caribbean Games
