= Jamaica at the 2024 Summer Olympics =

- IOC code: JAM
- NOC: Jamaica Olympic Association
- Website: www.joa.org.jm

in Paris, France 26 July 2024 – 11 August 2024
- Competitors: 58 (29 men and 29 women) in 4 sports
- Flag bearers (opening): Josh Kirlew & Shanieka Ricketts
- Flag bearer (closing): Rajindra Campbell
- Medals Ranked 44th: Gold 1 Silver 3 Bronze 2 Total 6

Summer Olympics appearances (overview)
- 1948; 1952; 1956; 1960; 1964; 1968; 1972; 1976; 1980; 1984; 1988; 1992; 1996; 2000; 2004; 2008; 2012; 2016; 2020; 2024; 2028

Other related appearances
- British West Indies (1960 S)

Jamaica competed at the 2024 Summer Olympics in Paris from 26 July to 11 August 2024. The country's participation signified its eighteenth Summer Olympic appearance as an independent state, although it has previously appeared in four other editions as a British colony or as part of the West Indies Federation.

== Medalists ==
Medal	Name	Sport	Event	Date
Gold	Rojé Stona	Athletics	Men's Discus throw	7 August
Silver	Shanieka Ricketts	Athletics	Women's triple jump	3 August
Silver	Kishane Thompson	Athletics	Men's 100 m	4 August
Silver	Wayne Pinnock	Athletics	Men's long jump	6 August
Bronze	Rajindra Campbell	Athletics	Men's shot put	3 August
Bronze	Rasheed Broadbell	Athletics	Men's 110 m hurdles	8 August

Medals by sport
Sport	1st place, gold medalist(s)	2nd place, silver medalist(s)	3rd place, bronze medalist(s)	Total
Athletics	1	3	2	6
Total	1	3	2	6

Medals by gender
Gender	1st place, gold medalist(s)	2nd place, silver medalist(s)	3rd place, bronze medalist(s)	Total
Male	1	2	2	5
Female	0	1	0	1
Mixed	0	0	0	0
Total	1	3	2	6

Medals by date
Date	1st place, gold medalist(s)	2nd place, silver medalist(s)	3rd place, bronze medalist(s)	Total
3 August	0	1	1	2
4 August	0	1	0	1
6 August	0	1	0	1
7 August	1	0	0	1
8 August	0	0	1	1
Total	1	3	2	6

== Competitors ==
The following is the list of number of competitors in the Games.

Sport	Men	Women	Total
Athletics	26	28	54
Diving	1	0	1
Judo	1	0	1
Swimming	1	1	2
Total	29	29	58

== Athletics ==
Jamaican track and field athletes achieved the entry standards for Paris 2024, either by passing the direct qualifying mark (or time for track and road races) or by world ranking, in the following events (a maximum of 3 athletes each):

Key

- Note–Ranks given for track events are within the athlete's heat only
- Q = Qualified for the next round
- q = Qualified for the next round as a fastest loser or, in field events, by position without achieving the qualifying target
- NR = National record
- N/A = Round not applicable for the event
- Bye = Athlete not required to compete in round

Track and road events
Men

Athlete	Event	Heat		Repechage		Semifinal		Final	
Athlete	Event	Result	Rank	Result	Rank	Result	Rank	Result	Rank
Ackeem Blake	100 m	10.06	2 Q	—N/a		10.06	5	Did not advance	
Oblique Seville	100 m	9.99	1 Q	—N/a		9.81	1 Q	9.91	8
Kishane Thompson	100 m	10.00	1 Q	—N/a		9.80	1 Q	9.79	2nd place, silver medalist(s)
Andrew Hudson	200 m	20.53	4 R	20.55	2	Did not advance			
Bryan Levell	200 m	20.47	4 R	20.47	2 q	20.93	8	Did not advance	
Sean Bailey	400 m	44.68	5 R	DNF		Did not advance			
Jevaughn Powell	400 m	45.12	3 Q	—N/a		44.91	4	Did not advance	
Deandre Watkin	400 m	45.97	7 R	DNS		Did not advance			
Navasky Anderson	800 m	1:46.82	5 R	1:46.01	5	Did not advance			
Orlando Bennett	110 m hurdles	13.35	2 Q	Bye		13.09 PB	1 Q	13.34	7
Rasheed Broadbell	110 m hurdles	13.42	2 Q	Bye		13.21	1 Q	13.09 SB	3rd place, bronze medalist(s)
Hansle Parchment	110 m hurdles	13.43(.430)	5 q	Bye		13.19 SB	3 Q	13.39	8
Roshawn Clarke	400 m hurdles	48.17	1 Q	Bye		48.34	2 Q	DNF	
Jaheel Hyde	400 m hurdles	49.08	2 Q	Bye		50.03	7	Did not advance	
Malik James-King	400 m hurdles	48.21	1 Q	Bye		48.85	7	Did not advance	
Ackeem Blake; Jehlani Gordon; Oblique Seville; Kishane Thompson	4 × 100 m relay	38.45 SB	4	—N/a				Did not advance	

Women

Athlete	Event	Heat		Repechage		Semifinal		Final	
Athlete	Event	Result	Rank	Result	Rank	Result	Rank	Result	Rank
Tia Clayton	100 m	11.00	2 Q	—N/a		10.89	1 Q	11.04	7
Shelly-Ann Fraser-Pryce	100 m	10.92	2 Q	—N/a		DNS		Did not advance	
Shashalee Forbes	100 m	11.19	2 Q	—N/a		11.20	6	Did not advance	
Niesha Burgher	200 m	22.54	2 Q	Bye		22.64	5	Did not advance	
Shericka Jackson	200 m	DNS		Did not advance					
Lanae-Tava Thomas	200 m	22.70	2 Q	Bye		22.77	5	Did not advance	
Junelle Bromfield	400 m	51.36	3 Q	Bye		51.93	8	Did not advance	
Nickisha Pryce	400 m	50.02	1 Q	Bye		50.77	4	Did not advance	
Stacey-Ann Williams	400 m	50.16 SB	2 Q	Bye		50.79	7	Did not advance	
Natoya Goule-Toppin	800 m	1:58.66	1 Q	Bye		1:59.14	6	Did not advance	
Adelle Tracey	800 m	2:03.47 SB	8 R	2:03.67	5	Did not advance			
Janeek Brown	100 m hurdles	12.84	3 Q	Bye		12.92	7	Did not advance	
Ackera Nugent	100 m hurdles	12.65	1 Q	Bye		12.44	3 q	DNF	
Danielle Williams	100 m hurdles	12.59	1 Q	Bye		12.82	6	Did not advance	
Rushell Clayton	400 m hurdles	54.32	1 Q	—N/a		53.00	1 Q	52.68	5
Janieve Russell	400 m hurdles	54.67	3 Q	—N/a		54.65	4	Did not advance	
Shiann Salmon	400 m hurdles	53.95	2 Q	—N/a		53.13	3 q	53.29	6
Tia Clayton; Shashalee Forbes; Kemba Nelson; Alana Reid	4 × 100 m relay	42.35 SB	3 Q	—N/a				42.29 SB	5
Junelle Bromfield; Stephenie Ann McPherson; Nickisha Pryce; Stacey-Ann Williams	4 × 400 m relay	3:24.92 SB	1 Q	—N/a				DNF	

Mixed

Athlete	Event	Heat		Final	
Athlete	Event	Result	Rank	Result	Rank
Zandrion Barnes; Raheem Hayles; Andrenette Knight; Ashley Williams	4 × 400 m relay	3:11.06 NR	3 q	3:11.67	5

Field events
Men

Athlete	Event	Qualification		Final	
Athlete	Event	Distance	Position	Distance	Position
Romaine Beckford	High jump	2.24	8 q	2.22	10
Tajay Gayle	Long jump	7.78	19	Did not advance	
Carey McLeod	Long jump	7.90	11 q	7.82	12
Wayne Pinnock	Long jump	7.96	7 q	8.36	2nd place, silver medalist(s)
Jaydon Hibbert	Triple jump	16.99	6 q	17.61	4
Jordan Scott	Triple jump	16.36	24	Did not advance	
Rajindra Campbell	Shot put	21.05	10 q	22.15	3rd place, bronze medalist(s)
Ralford Mullings	Discus throw	65.18	7 q	65.61	9
Traves Smikle	Discus throw	65.91	5 q	64.97	10
Rojé Stona	Discus throw	65.32	6 q	70.00 OR, PB	1st place, gold medalist(s)

Women

Athlete	Event	Qualification		Final	
Athlete	Event	Distance	Position	Distance	Position
Lamara Distin	High jump	1.88	24	Did not advance	
Chanice Porter	Long jump	6.48	17	Did not advance	
Ackelia Smith	Long jump	6.59	10 q	6.66	8
Shanieka Ricketts	Triple jump	14.47	2 Q	14.87	2nd place, silver medalist(s)
Ackelia Smith	Triple jump	14.09	10 q	14.42	7
Kimberly Williams	Triple jump	13.77	20	Did not advance	
Lloydricia Cameron	Shot put	18.02 SB	14	Did not advance	
Danniel Thomas-Dodd	Shot put	18.12	13	Did not advance	
Samantha Hall	Discus throw	54.94	31	Did not advance	
Nayoka Clunis	Hammer throw	Withdrawn			

== Diving ==
Jamaica entered one diver, Yona Knight-Wisdom, into the Olympic competition

Athlete	Event	Preliminary		Semifinal		Final	
Athlete	Event	Points	Rank	Points	Rank	Points	Rank
Yona Knight-Wisdom	Men's 3 m springboard	382.90	14 Q	412.40	13	Did not advance	

== Judo ==
Jamaica qualified one judoka for the following weight class at the Games. Ashley Mckenzie (men's extra-lightweight, 60 kg) qualified via continental quota based on Olympic point rankings.

Athlete	Event	Round of 32	Round of 16	Quarterfinals	Semifinals	Repechage	Final / BM	
Athlete	Event	Opposition Result	Opposition Result	Opposition Result	Opposition Result	Opposition Result	Opposition Result	Rank
Ashley Mckenzie	Men's –60 kg	Makabr (YEM); W 10–00	Yıldız (TUR); L 00–01	Did not advance				

== Swimming ==
Jamaica will have one male swimmer, Josh Kirlew, in the men's 100m butterfly event and one female swimmer, Sabrina Lyn, in the women's 50m freestyle, at the 2024 Paris Olympics Games.

Athlete	Event	Heat		Semifinal		Final	
Athlete	Event	Time	Rank	Time	Rank	Time	Rank
Josh Kirlew	Men's 100 m butterfly	54.66	5	Did not advance			
Sabrina Lyn	Women's 50 m freestyle	26.08	5	Did not advance			

== See also ==
- Jamaica at the 2024 Winter Youth Olympics
- Jamaica at the 2024 Summer Paralympics
