= Maxwell Seales =

Saint Lucian sprinter (born 1972)

Maxwell Seales (born 27 August 1972) is an athlete from Saint Lucia.

He was part of the first ever team to represent Saint Lucia at the Olympic Games when he competed at the 1996 Summer Olympic Games in the 4 x 100 metres relay, the relay team finished fifth in their heat so he did not advance to the next round.
