= McKenzie Long =

American athlete (born 2000)

McKenzie Long OLY
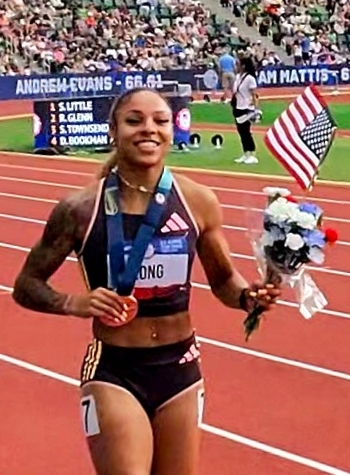
- Long in 2024

Personal information
- Nationality: American
- Born: July 11, 2000 (age 26)
- Height: 165 cm (5 ft 5 in)

Sport
- Sport: Athletics
- Event: Sprint

Achievements and titles
- Personal bests: 60m: 7.10 (Albuquerque, 2023); 100m: 10.92 (Lexington, 2024); 200m: 21.83 (Eugene, 2024)

McKenzie Long OLY (born July 11, 2000) is an American sprinter.

== Early life ==
She attended Ironton High School in southern Ohio, as well as Hamilton Township High School and Pickerington High School Central in Ohio. She became Ohio indoor state champion over 60 metres and committed to North Carolina State University in October 2017. In 2023, Long would transfer to the University of Mississippi.

== Career ==
Long spent four years at the North Carolina State University, where she suffered a severe hip injury which took 12 months to recover from causing her to miss the 2021 outdoor and 2022 indoors seasons. In May 2022, she set a North Carolina State record of 23.00 in the 200 metres. She placed fifth in the 60 meters and second in the 200m in the 2023 SEC indoors championships, and then seventh in the 60m and fourth in the 200m at the 2023 NCAA indoors championships.

Running for the University of Mississippi, Long won the SEC Championship 200 metres in 2023, running 22.39 seconds to beat Jacious Sears, Kaila Jackson and Talitha Diggs. She retained her title in Gainesville, Florida in May 2024 at the 2024 SEC Outdoor Championships. In doing so, she set a world-leading and SEC meet record wind-legal personal best time of 22.03 (+0.6), which placed her fifth in collegiate history and No. 22 all-time in the United States.

At the 2024 NCAA Division I Outdoor Track and Field Championships, she won the 100m title with a wind-assisted time of 10.82 (+2.2), she then won the 200m title, clocking a time of 21.83, the second fastest time run by a collegiate athlete. She would add a third championship victory when Ole Miss went on to win the 4x100 relay. Long's efforts would help Ole Miss to become just the fourth team in women's NCAA Outdoor history to sweep all three events after Florida State (1984), LSU (1989, 1990, 1996), and Texas (1991, 2023).

Long made her first Olympic team by finishing third in the 200m at the 2024 Olympic Trials with a time of 21.91. She competed at the 2024 Summer Olympics in Paris over 200 metres, reaching the final and placing seventh overall.

She placed fourth in the 200 metres at the 2025 Diamond League event at the 2025 Golden Gala in Rome on 6 June 2025. Later that month, she finished third at the 2025 Meeting de Paris. On 12 July 2025, she ran 21.93 seconds for the 200 metres at the Ed Murphey Track Classic, a World Athletics Continental Tour Silver event, in Memphis, Tennessee. She placed fifth in the 200 metres at the 2025 USA Outdoor Track and Field Championships in 22.20 seconds, given the same time as third placed Gabby Thomas. She placed eighth over 200 metres at the Diamond League Final in Zurich on 28 August.

In September 2025, she was a finalist in the 200 metres at the 2025 World Championships in Tokyo, Japan, placing eighth overall with a time of 22.78 seconds in the final.

In May 2026, Long had top-five finishes in both the 100 metres and 200 metres in the 2026 Diamond League meeting in Rabat.

== Athletics achievements ==
Information from her World Athletics profile unless otherwise noted.

=== Personal bests ===
Type	Distance	Time (s)	Wind (m/s)	Venue	Date	Notes
Individual events
Indoor	60 metres	7.10	—N/a	Albuquerque, United States	10 March 2023	
Indoor	200 metres sh	22.48	—N/a	Albuquerque, United States	10 March 2023	
Indoor	300 metres sh	39.48	—N/a	Clemson, United States	11 January 2019	
Outdoor	100 metres	10.91	+0.0	Eugene, United States	6 June 2024	
Outdoor	200 metres	21.83	+1.0	Eugene, United States	8 June 2024	
Outdoor	400 metres	57.36	—N/a	Raleigh, United States	25 March 2022	
Individual events
Outdoor	4 × 100 metres relay	42.22	—N/a	Eugene, United States	6 June 2024	
Outdoor	Mixed 4 × 100 metres relay	41.96	—N/a	Gainesville, United States	4 April 2024	
Outdoor	4 × 400 metres relay	3:44.51	—N/a	Baton Rouge, United States	13 May 2023	

=== International competitions ===
Representing the United States
Year	Competition	Venue	Position	Event	Time	Notes
2024	Olympic Games	Paris, France	7th	200 m	22.42	
2025	World Championships	Tokyo, Japan	8th	200 m	22.78	

=== National championships and competitions ===
Year	Competition	Venue	Position	Event	Time	Notes
2019	USA U20 Championships	Miramar, Florida	6th	100 m	11.48	
2019	USA U20 Championships	Miramar, Florida	5th	200 m	23.31	
2023	NCAA Division I Indoor Championships	Albuquerque, New Mexico	7th	60 m	7.19	
2023	NCAA Division I Indoor Championships	Albuquerque, New Mexico	4th	200 m sh	22.54	
2023	NCAA Division I Championships	Austin, Texas	9th	100 m	11.13	
2023	NCAA Division I Championships	Austin, Texas	2nd	200 m	21.88	
2023	NCAA Division I Championships	Austin, Texas	13th (sf)	4 × 100 m relay	43.49	
2023	USA Championships	Eugene, Oregon	11th (sf)	200 m	22.61	
2024	NCAA Division I Indoor Championships	Boston, Massachusetts	2nd	200 m sh	22.51	
2024	NCAA Division I Indoor Championships	Eugene, Oregon	1st	100 m	10.82	
2024	NCAA Division I Indoor Championships	Eugene, Oregon	1st	200 m	21.83	PB CL
2024	NCAA Division I Indoor Championships	Eugene, Oregon	1st	4 × 100 m relay	42.34	
2024	U.S. Olympic Trials	Eugene, Oregon	12th (sf)	100 m	11.15	
2024	U.S. Olympic Trials	Eugene, Oregon	3rd	200 m	21.91	
2025	USA Championships	Eugene, Oregon	5th	200 m	22.20	
2026	USA Indoor Championships	New York, United States	4th (h)	60 m	7.20	SB
2026	USA Championships	New York, United States	5th	200 m	22.74	

== Personal life ==
Long has completed voluntary work in projects supporting food sustainability and security.
