= Cecilia Tamayo-Garza =

Mexican athlete

Personal information
- Native name: Cecilia Tamayo Garza
- Nickname: Ceci
- Born: 4 March 1997 (age 29) León, Guanajuato, Mexico
- Height: 1.67 m (5 ft 6 in)

Sport
- Sport: Athletics
- Event: Sprint

Achievements and titles
- Personal bests: 200m: 22.45 (2023) - NR; 100m: 11.10 (2023)

Cecilia Tamayo Garza (spelled Tamayo-Garza in international competitions; born 4 March 1997) is a Mexican sprinter. She has won over 10 national titles and is national record holder over 200 metres.

== Career ==
Tamayo Garza earned multiple national titles in both the 100m and 200m events between 2021 and 2024. In 2021, she set a Mexican record of 23.02 seconds in the 200 m, which she later improved to 22.45 seconds at a meet in Tampa, Florida in 2023.

She is trained by Carl Lewis.

Internationally, she has represented Mexico at events such as the 2023 World Athletics Championships in Budapest in the 200 metres. She qualified for the final of the 100 metres at the 2023 Pan American Games in Santiago.

She competed in the 2024 Summer Olympics in Paris in both the 100 metres and 200 metres. With this achievement, she became the first Mexican woman in 20 years to compete in the 100 metres at the Olympic Games and ended a 56-year absence for Mexico in the 200 metres.

She is also the third Mexican woman in history to contest both events simultaneously.

== Key Achievements ==
- Mexican record holder – 200 metres (22.45, 2023)
- Eleven-time Mexican national champion
- Olympian (2024)

== Personal life ==
She is from León, Guanajuato.

In 2026, Tamayo launched Generación Spike, an initiative that provides professional sprint spikes to young Mexican athletes. The program selected five recipients from across Mexico through a nationwide application process.
