= Julien Alfred =

Saint Lucian sprinter (born 2001)

The Hon. Julien Alfred SLC
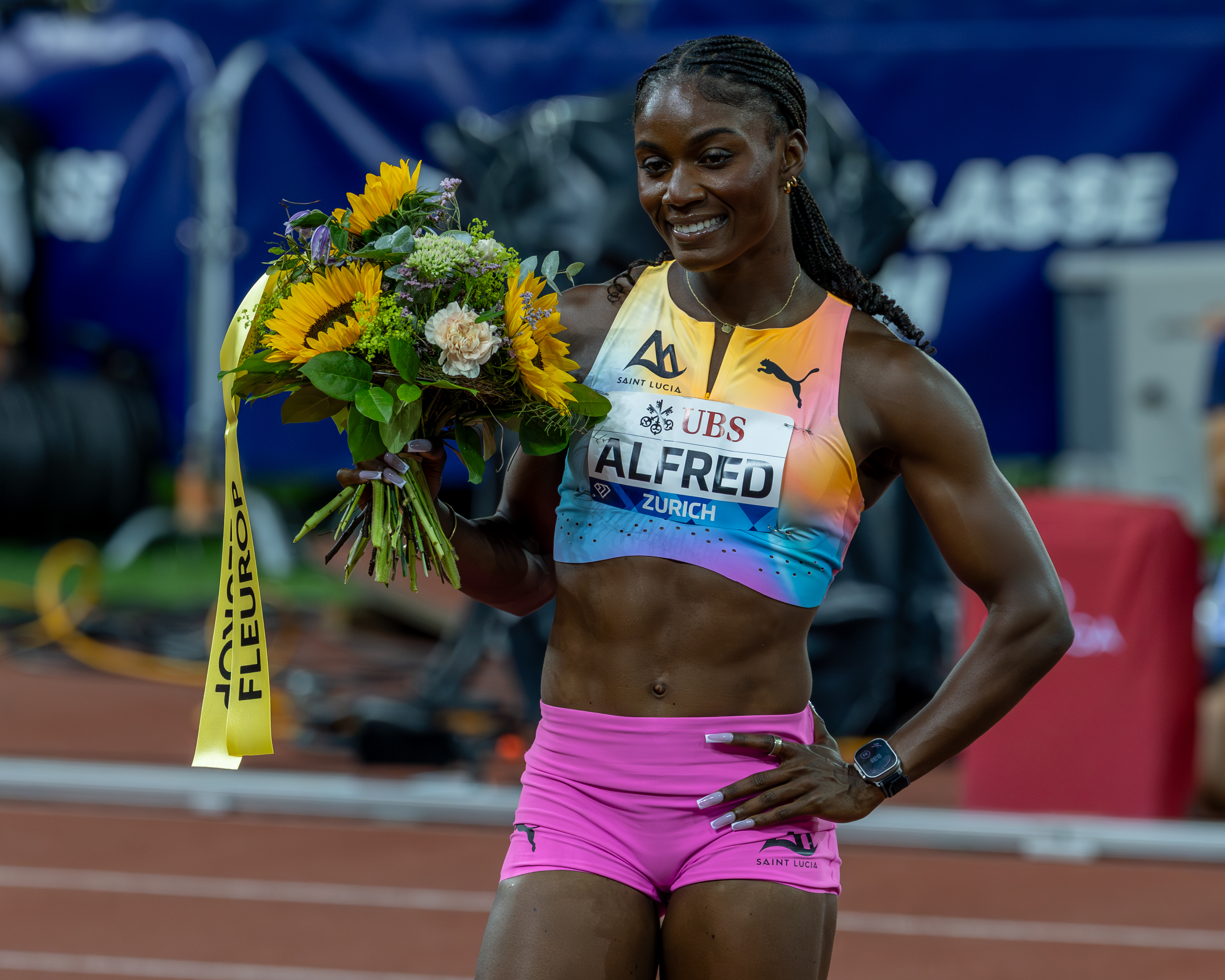
- Alfred after setting a national record the at the 2026 Weltklasse Zürich

Personal information
- Nickname: Juju
- Born: 10 June 2001 (age 25) Ciceron, Castries, Saint Lucia
- Education: Leon Hess Comprehensive Secondary School, St. Catherine High School, University of Texas
- Height: 170 cm (5 ft 7 in)

Sport
- Country: Saint Lucia
- Sport: Track and field
- Event: Sprints
- College team: Texas Longhorns
- Coached by: Edrick Floreal

Achievements and titles
- Personal bests: 100 m: 10.70 NR (Zürich 2026); 200 m: 21.51 NR (Monaco 2026); Indoors; 60 m: 6.94 =AR (Albuquerque 2023); 200 m: 22.01 NR (Albuquerque 2023)
Medal record
Women's athletics
Representing Saint Lucia
Olympic Games
Gold medal – first place	2024 Paris	100 m
Silver medal – second place	2024 Paris	200 m
World Championships
Bronze medal – third place	2025 Tokyo	100 m
World Ultimate Championship
Second place	2026 Budapest	100 m
World Indoor Championships
Gold medal – first place	2024 Glasgow	60 m
Bronze medal – third place	2026 Toruń	60 m
Diamond League
First place	2024	100 m
First place	2025	100 m
First place	2026	200 m
Central American and Caribbean Games
Gold medal – first place	2023 San Salvador	100 m
Commonwealth Games
Silver medal – second place	2022 Birmingham	100 m
Youth Olympic Games
Silver medal – second place	2018 Buenos Aires	100 m
Commonwealth Youth Games
Gold medal – first place	2017 Nassau	100 m

Julien Alfred (born 10 June 2001) is a Saint Lucian sprinter. She won the gold medal at the 2024 Summer Olympics in the 100 metres event, setting a new national record of 10.72s in the final. Her medal was the first-ever Olympic medal for Saint Lucia. She then won a silver in the 200 metres. Alfred also won the gold medal in the 60 metres at the 2024 World Athletics Indoor Championships.

Alfred was a silver medalist in the 100 metres at the 2022 Commonwealth Games. She is the joint North American indoor record holder for the 60 metres, and was the first woman in NCAA history to break the seven-second barrier over the 60 m. Alfred is a three-time individual NCAA Division I champion.

== Biography ==
Alfred was born in the south Castries community of Ciceron. Her father died when she was 12 years old. She attended Leon Hess Comprehensive Secondary School in Saint Lucia (2013–2015) and St. Catherine High School in Jamaica (2015–2018). She then pursued a bachelor's degree in Youth & Community Studies at the University of Texas in the United States, combining academic studies and athletics.

Alfred was a Central American and Caribbean U15 champion in 2015. Both that year and in 2017, she was recognised as Saint Lucia's Junior Sportswoman of the Year. As a junior athlete, she was the Commonwealth Youth Games 100 m champion in 2017, when the Games were held in Nassau, Bahamas. She also captured silver in the 2018 Youth Olympic Games in Buenos Aires, Argentina behind Nigeria's Rosemary Chukwuma.

=== 2022: NCAA Division I and Caribbean Games champion ===
In 2022, Alfred had the all-time best NCAA performance in the 60 m at the NCAA Division I Indoor Championships, running a fast 7.04 s in the heats. Then at the age of 21, she became one of the top 30 fastest women ever. Her run of 10.81 s (+1.7 m/s) in preliminaries of the women's 100 m at the Big 12 Conference Championships in Lubbock, Texas on 14 May was a Saint Lucia national and championship record. It also marked her as the fastest woman ever from the Organisation of Eastern Caribbean States. At the time, only six Caribbean women had ever run faster, and in the NACAC region 17. The same month, she ran a wind-aided 10.80 s (+2.2 m/s) at the NCAA West Preliminary Round - the fastest time ever recorded under any conditions at the event. She won the 2022 NCAA Division I 100 m title in 11.02 s (+0.2 m/s) the day after her 21st birthday, completing an unbeaten collegiate season in that event. Running for the University of Texas, she became the first track athlete from Saint Lucia to win a Division I championship, and just the second Saint Lucian overall, after high jumper Jeanelle Scheper. She next went on to win her event at the inaugural Caribbean Games in Les Abymes, Guadeloupe in a time of 11.07 seconds (−0.2 m/s).

=== 2023: North American 60 m record ===
On 25 February 2023, Alfred broke for the fourth time existing collegiate record and became the first woman in NCAA to ever dip under 7 seconds over the 60 metres with a time of 6.97 s at the Big 12 Indoor Championships in Lubbock, TX. Her time moved her up to eighth on the world all-time list. She also achieved the second-fastest all-time collegian mark in the 200 m of 22.26 s, behind only Abby Steiner, to become the fourth-fastest woman of all time. On 11 March at the NCAA Indoors in Albuquerque, New Mexico (at altitude), Alfred improved at both these events with times of 6.94 s and 22.01 s respectively to take both titles and move to second on both respective world all-time lists. With "the greatest ever one day sprint double", she missed Irina Privalova's 60 m world record from 1993 by two hundredths of a second but equalled Aleia Hobbs' North American record. In the 200 m, only Merlene Ottey’s 21.87 s dating back also to 1993 had been faster. Julien went on to compete in the women's 100m race at the Istvan Gyulai Memorial, crossing the finish line with a time of 10.89 seconds, resulting in a victory over sprinter Sha'Carri Richardson.

After the end of the 2022–23 academic year, Alfred and TCU football star Max Duggan were named as Big 12 Conference Athletes of the Year.

Selected for the 2023 World Athletics Championships in Budapest, she qualified for the final of the 100 metres and finished in fifth place. She also competed in the 200 metres at the Championships, and qualified for the finals and finished fourth.

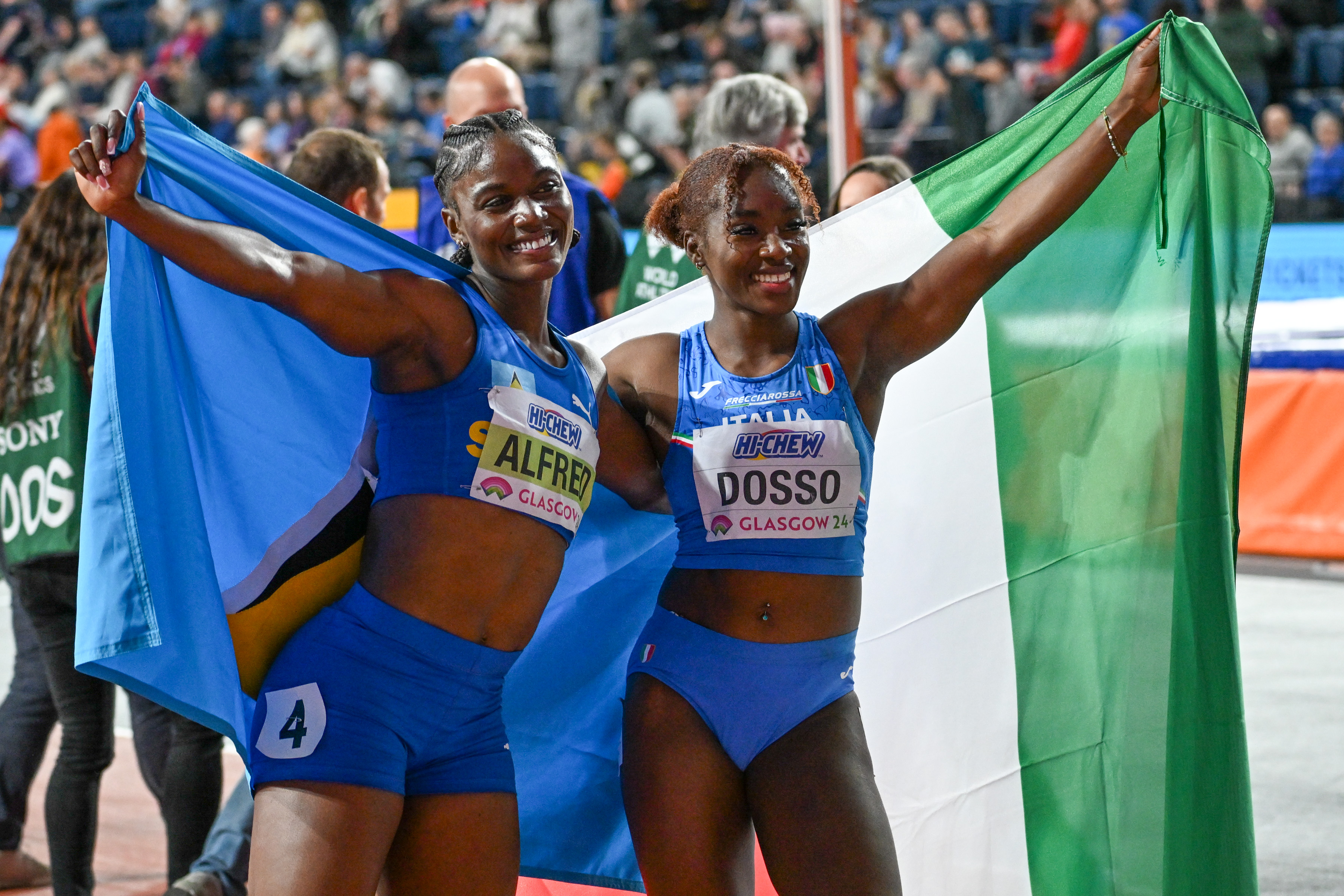
Alfred (left) at the 2024 World Indoor Championships

=== 2024: Olympic and World Indoor titles ===
She won gold in the women's 60 metres at the 2024 World Athletics Indoor Championships in Glasgow, with a world leading time of 6.98 seconds. It was Saint Lucia's first ever World Athletics Indoor Championship medal.

She finished second in the 100 metres at the Prefontaine Classic in Eugene, Oregon in a time of 10.93 seconds. Alfred ran a lifetime best and equalled the stadium record in the women's 100 metres at the Racers Grand Prix in Kingston, Jamaica on 1 June 2024, running 10.78 seconds. On 12 July, she won the 100 metres in 10.85 seconds at the Herculis Diamond League event in Monaco. Alfred set a new national 200 m record of 21.86 seconds as she finished second behind Gabrielle Thomas at the Diamond League meeting in London on 20 July.

She won gold in the women's 100 metres at the 2024 Summer Olympics in Paris with a national record time of 10.72 seconds, which earned Saint Lucia its first-ever Olympic medal. She also secured a silver medal in the 200 metres with a time of 22.08 seconds, finishing behind Gabrielle Thomas. Following the Olympics, Alfred won the 100 m at the Diamond League Final in Brussels on 13 September, clocking 10.88 s.

Alfred's victory in the Olympics sparked celebrations in Saint Lucia, with the government subsequently declaring 27 September 2024 as "Julien Alfred Day".

=== 2025: World 100 m bronze ===
Alfred won the 100 metres in a meeting record 10.75 seconds (+0.9 m/s) in Stockholm at the BAUHAUS-galan event, part of the 2025 Diamond League, on 15 June. She ran 10.77 seconds to finish second to Melissa Jefferson-Wooden in the 100 metres at the Prefontaine Classic on 5 July into a headwind (-1.5 m/s). She ran a 21.71, the joint-ninth fastest of all time, to win the 200 m at the 2025 London Athletics Meet. She ran 10.76 seconds to win the 100 metres at the Diamond League Final in Zurich on 28 August.

In September, she was a bronze medalist in the 100 metres at the 2025 World Championships in Tokyo, Japan, running 10.84 seconds in the final.

=== 2026: 100 m and 200 m national records ===
On 13 February, Alfred went into an early world lead with 6.99 seconds for the 60 metres at the Tyson Invitational in Fayetteville, Arkansas, winning ahead of Jacious Sears. Competing at the World Indoor Championships in Toruń, Poland on 21 March, Alfred won the bronze medal in the 60 metres, running 7.03 seconds to finish three thousandths of a second behind silver medalist Jacious Sears, with both behind Zaynab Dosso.

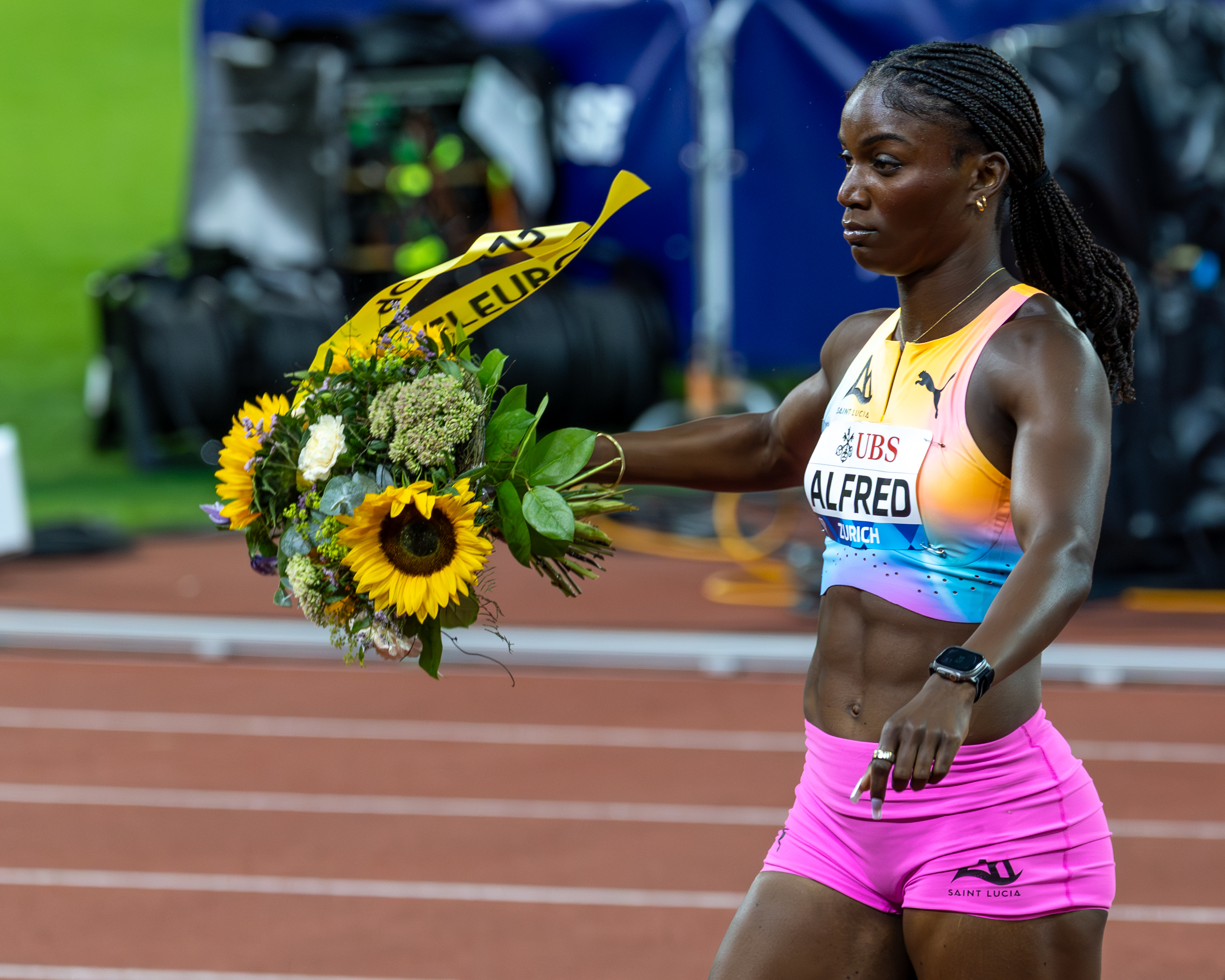
Julien Alfred after winning the women’s 100 m at 2026 Weltklasse Zürich.

On 4 June, Alfred won ahead of Melissa Jefferson-Wooden in the women's 200 metres at the 2026 Diamond League event in Rome, running 21.93 seconds. The following week, she won over 100 metres in a wind-assisted Diamond League race in Oslo. On 10 July, she ran a national record of 21.51 seconds to win the 200 metres at the Herculis Diamond League event in Monaco. The time moved her to third on the world all-time list behind only Florence Griffith Joyner and Shericka Jackson. On 14 July, she won over 100 metres at the István Gyulai Memorial, in Budapest, running 10.87 seconds into a headwind. Competing at the London Athletics Meet on 18 July, Alfred won the 200 m in a meeting record 21.66 (+0.1) ahead of Gabby Thomas, for her third win in nine days.

On 23 August, she competed over 100 metres and ran a season's best time of 10.83 seconds (0.6m/s) to finish runner-up to Jefferson-Wooden in the Diamond League at the Kamila Skolimowska Memorial in Silesia, Poland. On 27 August, she edged ahead of Jefferson-Wooden in a photo-finish to win in a new national record of 10.70 seconds for the 100 metres at the Weltklasse Zürich, despite a headwind (-0.7). At the 2026 Diamond League Final in Brussels on 4 September, Alfred ran 21.79 seconds (0.1m/s) to win her third Diamond League title in as many years, and her first in the 200 metres. On 12 September, she ran 10.74 seconds to place second over 100 m at the inaugural World Ultimate Championship in Budapest.

== Achievements ==
=== Personal bests ===
Type	Distance	Time (s)	Wind (m/s)	Venue	Date	Notes
Individual events
Indoor	60 metres	6.94	—N/a	Albuquerque, United States	11 March 2023	=AR NR
Indoor	200 metres sh	22.01	—N/a	Albuquerque, United States	11 March 2023	NR
Indoor	300 metres sh	36.16	—N/a	Boston, United States	2 February 2025	NBP
Indoor	400 metres sh	52.97	—N/a	Clemson, United States	14 February 2025	NR
Outdoor	100 metres	10.70	−0.7	Zurich, Switzerland	27 August 2026	NR
Outdoor	200 metres	21.51	+0.9	Fontvieille, Monaco	10 July 2026	NR
Outdoor	300 metres	36.05	—N/a	Miramar, United States	5 April 2025	NR
Outdoor	400 metres	52.97	—N/a	Clemson, United States	14 February 2025	
Team events
Indoor	4 × 400 metres relay sh	3:25.67	—N/a	Albuquerque, United States	11 March 2023	
Outdoor	4 × 100 metres relay	41.55	—N/a	Austin, United States	8 June 2023	
Outdoor	4 × 200 metres relay	1:27.05	—N/a	Austin, United States	30 March 2024	
Outdoor	4 × 400 metres relay	3:23.27	—N/a	Austin, United States	1 April 2023	

=== International competitions ===
Representing Saint Lucia
Year	Competition	Venue	Position	Event	Result
2016	CARIFTA Games, U18 events	St. George's, Grenada	5th	100 m	11.90
2016	CARIFTA Games, U18 events	St. George's, Grenada	5th (h3)	200 m	25.34
2017	Commonwealth Youth Games	Nassau, Bahamas	1st	100 m	11.56
2018	CARIFTA Games, U20 events	Nassau, Bahamas	5th	100 m	11.68
2018	Youth Olympic Games	Buenos Aires, Argentina	2nd	100 m ev.	23.22
2022	Caribbean Games, U23 events	Basse-Terre, France	1st	100 m	11.07
2022	World Championships	Eugene, United States	– (sf)	100 m	DQ
2022	Commonwealth Games	Birmingham, England	2nd	100 m	11.01
2022	Commonwealth Games	Birmingham, England	–	200 m	DNS
2023	Central American and Caribbean Games	San Salvador, El Salvador	1st	100 m	11.14
2023	World Championships	Budapest, Hungary	5th	100 m	10.93
2023	World Championships	Budapest, Hungary	4th	200 m	22.05
2024	World Indoor Championships	Glasgow, Scotland	1st	60 m	6.98
2024	Olympic Games	Paris, France	1st	100 m	10.72 NR
2024	Olympic Games	Paris, France	2nd	200 m	22.08
2025	World Championships	Tokyo, Japan	3rd	100 m	10.84
2026	World Indoor Championships	Toruń, Poland	3rd	60 m	7.03
2026	World Ultimate Championship	Budapest, Hungary	2nd	100 m	10.74

=== NCAA titles ===
- NCAA Division I Women's Outdoor Track and Field Championships
  - 100 metres: 2022
  - 4 × 100 m relay: 2022
- NCAA Division I Women's Indoor Track and Field Championships
  - 60 metres: 2023
  - 200 metres: 2023

== Recognition ==
- USTFCCCA Women's Indoor National Track Athlete of the Year: 2023
- Big 12 Athlete of the Year: 2023
- Saint Lucia Cross (SLC): 2025
