= Nordic Championship =

The Nordic Championships often refers to a number of sporting competitions for Nordic countries. For some of the competitions they are the top achievement in a sport or contest for Nordic athletes. Nordic Championships were held in a number of sports, but have usually been discontinued in favour of more global tournaments.

- Nordic Artistic Gymnastics Championships
- Nordic Badminton Championships, defunct
- Nordic Basketball Championship
- Nordic Bouldering and Lead Climbing Championships
- Nordic Chess Championship
- Nordic Figure Skating Championships
- Nordic Football Championship, discontinued 1983 with a short revival in 2001
- Nordic Women's Football Championship
- Nordic Hockey Championship
- Nordic Open Orienteering Championships
- Nordic Quizzing Championships
- Nordic Strongman Championships
- Nordic Swimming Championships
- Nordic Table Tennis Championship
- Scandinavian Touring Car Championship

Athletics

- Athletics
- Indoor
- Marathon
- Cross Country
- Combined Events
- Race Walking
- Indoor Race Walking
- Under-23
- Under-20
- Junior Combined Events

Shooting

- Handgun
- Mini Rifle
- Shotgun
- Rifle

For the ongoing annual international youth football tournament featuring the Nordic nations and other invited national teams, see:

- Nordic Under-17 Football Championship
