= Sport in the Nordic countries =

Nordic countries

Sport in the Nordic countries includes Nordic cooperation through inter-Nordic federations, Nordic championships and other events, joint bidding for international event hosting, and maintenance of Nordic records in several sports. The Nordic countries, both generally and in sports, usually considers at least Denmark, Finland, Iceland, Norway, and Sweden. The Faroe Islands, in some sports competing under their own flag, are considered to be part of the Nordic countries, and since the 1990s, also national governing bodies of Estonia, Latvia, and Lithuania are considered to be part of the Nordic countries in some sports.

== History ==
=== Nordic countries ===
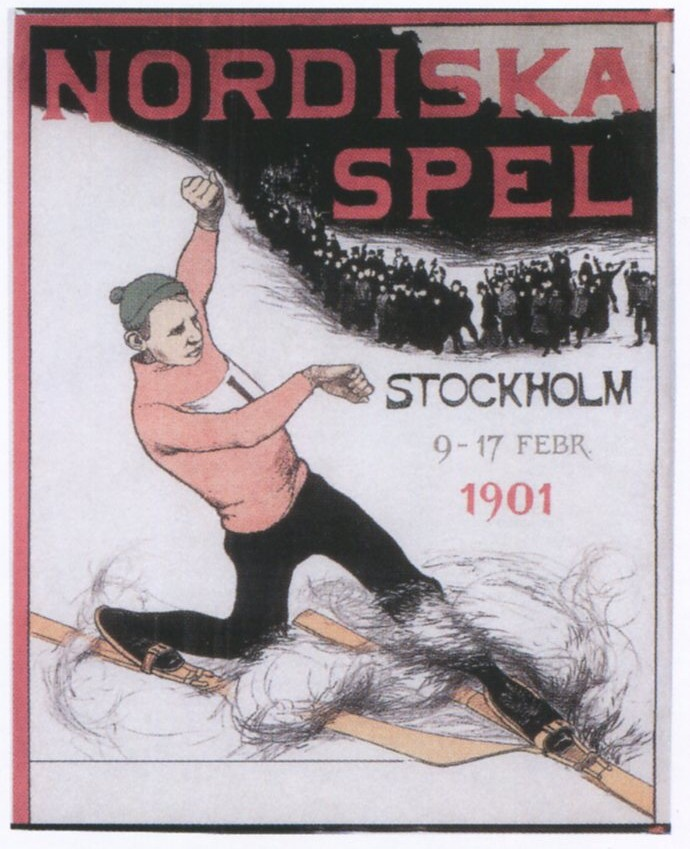
Poster for the 1901 Nordic Games

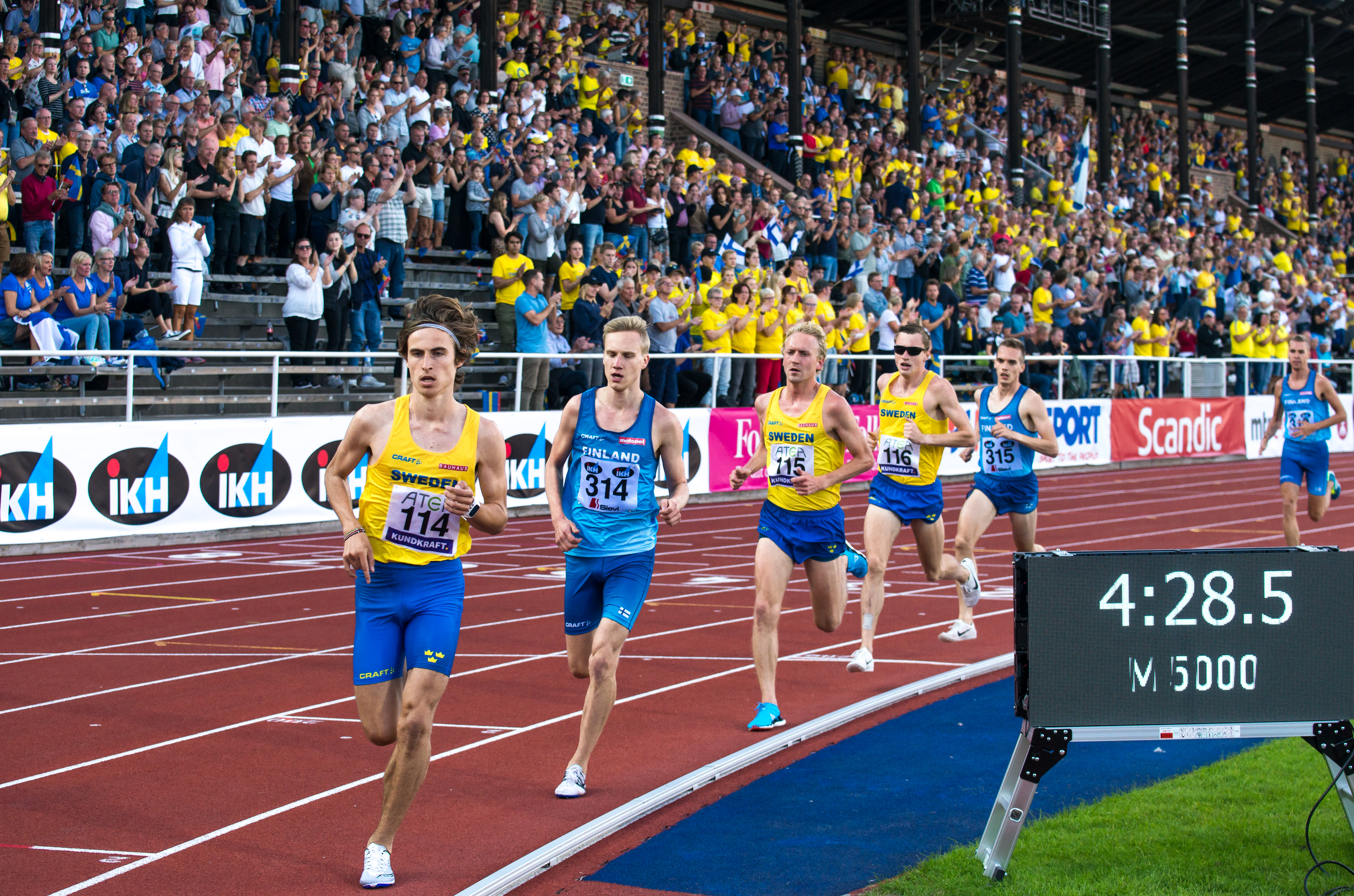
Men's 5000 metres during the 2019 Finland–Sweden Athletics International

During the late 18th century and early 19th century Romanticism, a Nordic thought of similarity, closeness and distinctiveness evolved. When Finland was conquered by the Russian Empire, the concept of Scandinavism became more present linking Denmark and the Union between Sweden and Norway. In 1907, Denmark, Norway, and Sweden founded the Nordic Interparliamentary Association. When Finland became independent in 1917, the thought of a Nordic affinity returned. The Nordic Council was established in 1952.

=== Sport ===
Suggested in 1899, the Nordic Games were first held in Stockholm, Sweden, in 1901 and followed by six more editions until 1926. The organiser was the Swedish Central Association for the Promotion of Sports. The program focused on winter sports such as skiing and skating events but also included swimming and a long-distance equestrian event. A similar event was also held in Kristiania (now Oslo) in 1903 by a different organiser.

The first decades of the 20th century saw the start of several Nordic championships and inter-Nordic competitions: in the 1900s, Nordic championships were first held in athletics, and the 1910s saw the introduction of championships in bicycle racing, wrestling, fencing, rowing, speed skating, figure skating and swimming; a four-nation tennis tournament for teams, Nordiska Lawntennispokalen was introduced by Finland in 1919 and was contested between Denmark, Finland, Norway and Sweden; the equestrian event Nordiska ryttartävlingar were introduced in 1921 with individual and team competition; and in 1925 the Finland–Sweden Athletics International started.

More recently, in 2011, the Nordic Indoor Athletics Match, a national team athletics competition between Finland, Norway, Sweden and a Denmark–Iceland combination was introduced. The men's Nordic Futsal Cup started in 2013 with Denmark, Finland, Norway, and Sweden In 2018, a four-nation ice hockey national team competition between Denmark, Finland, Norway and Sweden was presented.

== Competitions ==
=== Nordic championships ===
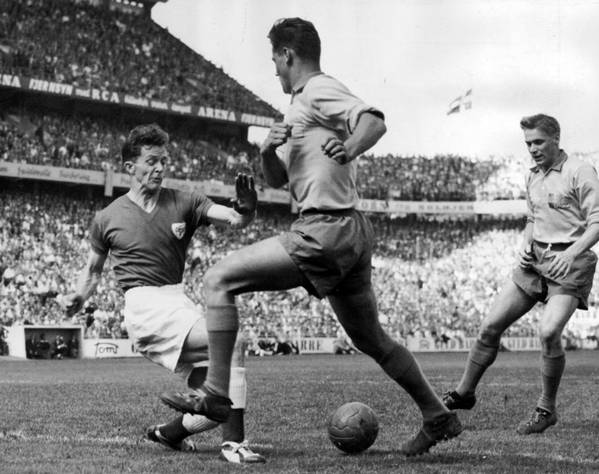
Denmark–Sweden during the 1956–59 Nordic Football Championship

Up until the 1940s, Nordic championships had been held in athletics, amateur wrestling, archery, road bicycle racing, track cycling, canoeing, fencing, motorcycle racing, rowing, sports shooting, swimming, figure skating (Nordic Figure Skating Championships), and speed skating. Further on, four-nation tournaments in boxing and swimming had selected Nordic champions and Nordic champions in football had also been decided through counting selected national games in football in the Nordic Football Championship.

=== Nordic youth championships and youth events ===
On youth level, Nordic championships are held in several sports, e.g. athletics, sailing, and swimming Scandinavian championships for football youth teams, namely boys' under-17 and under-19 teams, were introduced in 2016 for U19 teams and were first played in Sweden, then in Marbella, Spain.

=== Tours and series ===
The Scandinavian Cup is a cross-country skiing tour featuring 2025–26 events in Finland, Iceland, and Sweden. The Scandinavian Touring Car Championship is a touring-car racing championship that started in 2011. The Nordic Golf League is a golf tour started in 1999, and then had 33 events in Denmark, Finland, Norway, and Sweden.

=== International event hosting ===
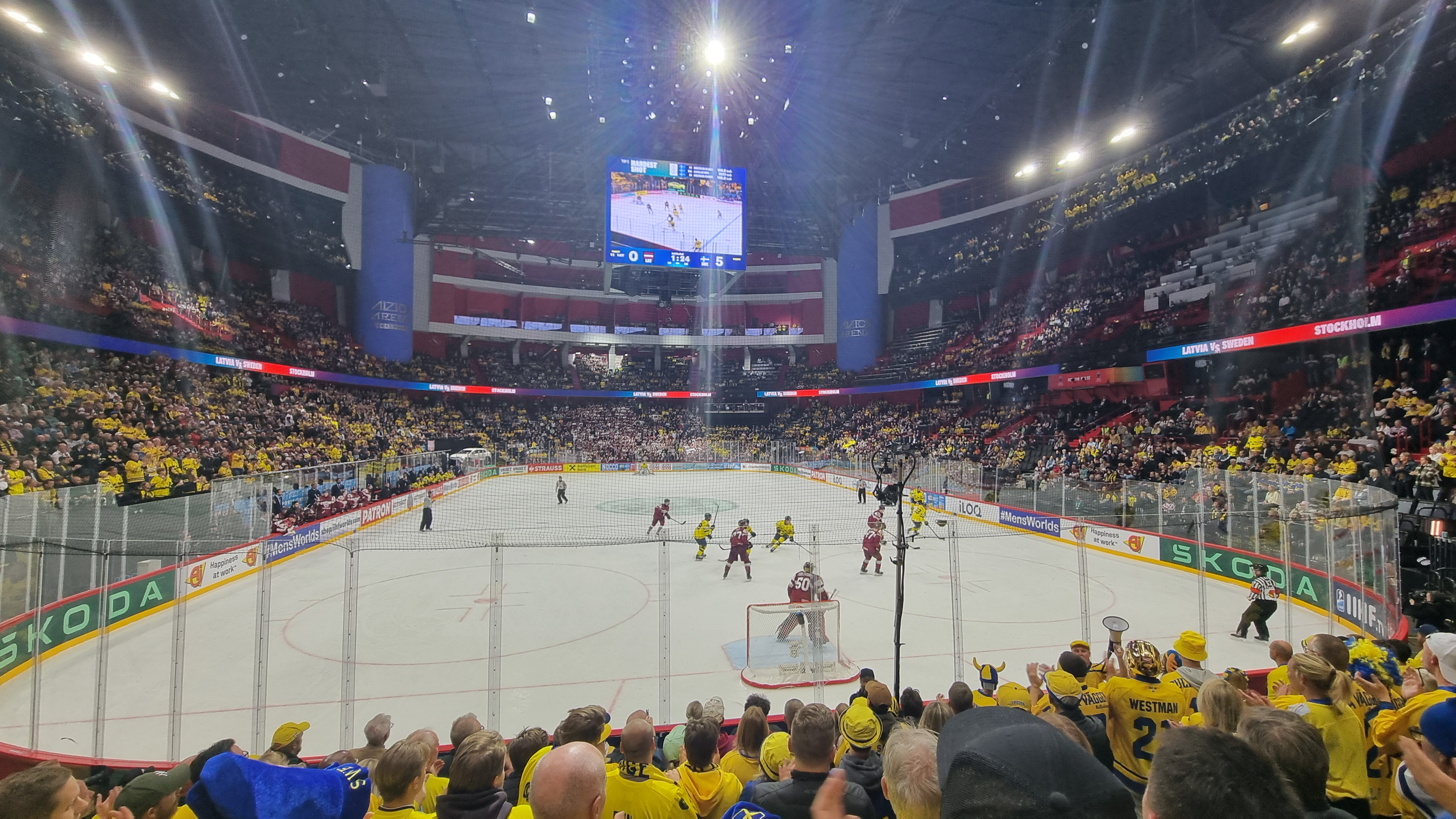
Sweden vs Latvia at the Avicii Arena, Stockholm, during the 2025 IIHF World Championship

Denmark, Finland, Norway, and Sweden unsuccessfully submitted a bid for the Euro 2008. The bid, named Nordic 2008, was announced in October 2001 and would make two countries automatically qualify as hosts. It featured two venues in each country with Ullevi in Gothenburg, Sweden, as the proposed venue of the final. In 2002, Swedish newspaper Aftonbladet reported that there were plans to let Nordic teams play a Nordic championship to determine qualification for UEFA Euro.

The same four countries unsuccessfully submitted a bid for the UEFA Women's Euro 2025. The Women's Euro bid featured three venues in Sweden and two in each other country. The Nordic Council stated in a press release that they supported a bid for the 2027 FIFA Women's World Cup, however no bid was materialised.

The 2012 and 2013 men's Ice Hockey World Championships were hosted by Finland and Sweden in the Ericsson Globe, Stockholm, and the Hartwall Arena, Helsinki. The 2025 edition of the tournament was hosted by Denmark and Sweden in Avicii Arena, Stockholm and Jyske Bank Boxen, Herning.

The 2023 World Women's Handball Championship was hosted by Denmark, Norway, and Sweden, with two venues in each country. The 2026 European Men's Handball Championship will be hosted by the same countries, with two venues in Sweden and one in each other country.

== Nordic federations ==
Sport	Federation	Founded	Member federations									Ref.
Sport	Federation	Founded	Denmark	Estonia	Faroe Islands	Finland	Iceland	Latvia	Lithuania	Norway	Sweden	Ref.
Athletics	Nordic Athletics		Denmark	–	–	Finland	Iceland	–	–	Norway	Sweden	
Cycle sport	Nordic Cycling	1913	Denmark	Estonia	Faroe Islands	Finland	Iceland	Latvia	Lithuania	Norway	Sweden	
Canoeing	Nordiska Kanotförbundet	1936	Denmark, Finland, Norway, and Sweden (1941 members)									
Fencing	Nordic Fencing Union	1993	Denmark	Estonia	–	Finland	Iceland	Latvia	Lithuania	Norway	Sweden	
Gymnastics	Nordens Gymnastikförbund	1919	nine federations in Denmark, Finland, Iceland, Norway, and Sweden (1940); as of 2025, Denmark, Finland, Iceland, Norway, and Sweden cooperates									
Motorcycle racing	Nordiska Motorcykel Förbundet	1925	Denmark, Finland, Norway, and Sweden (1943 members)									
Powerlifting	Nordic Powerlifting Federation	1975	Denmark	–	–	Finland	Iceland	–	–	Norway	Sweden	
Rowing	Nordic Rowing Federation	1910	Denmark	–	Faroe Islands	Finland	Iceland	–	–	Norway	Sweden	
Sailing	Nordic Sailing Federation	1915 (Note: as the Scandinavian Yacht Racing Union)	Denmark	Estonia	–	Finland	Iceland	Latvia	Lithuania	Norway	Sweden	
Swimming	Nordic Swimming Federation		Denmark	Estonia	Faroe Islands	Finland	Iceland	Latvia	Lithuania	Norway	Sweden	
Weightlifting	Nordic Weightlifting Federation	1940	Denmark	–	Faroe Islands	Finland	Iceland	–	–	Norway	Sweden	

== Nordic records ==
Nordic records are maintained in several sports, e.g. athletics, powerlifting, swimming, and weightlifting.

== See also ==
- Sport in Denmark
- Sport in Finland
- Sport in Iceland
- Sport in Norway
- Sport in Sweden
