= CBE (disambiguation) =

CBE is the initialism for Commander of the Most Excellent Order of the British Empire, a grade within the British order of chivalry.

CBE may also refer to:

== Travel ==
- CBE, IATA code for Greater Cumberland Regional Airport.
- CBE, ICAO code for Aerocaribe, airline based in Cancun, Mexico.
- CBE, National Rail station code for Canterbury East railway station
- CBE, Railway code for Coimbatore Junction
- Cross Bronx Expressway, a major freeway in the New York City borough of the Bronx.
- Cranbourne railway station, Melbourne

== Communications ==
- CBE, the former callsign of the CBC Radio One AM station in Windsor, Ontario.
- CBE-FM, callsign of the CBC Radio Two FM station in Windsor, Ontario.

== Banking ==
- The Central Bank of Egypt, the central (or reserve) bank in Egypt.
- Commercial Bank of Ethiopia, an Ethiopian bank founded in 1963.

== Education ==
- CBE, Competency-based education, another term for Competency-based learning
- Calgary Board of Education, public school board for the city of Calgary, Alberta.

== Science ==
- Cannabielsoin, a component of cannabis
- Carbon Balance Error, the error in accounting for Carbon in a mass balance
- Cat-back exhaust, a type of automotive exhaust.
- Cell Broadband Engine, a multi-core general purpose CPU developed jointly by Sony, Toshiba and IBM.
- Center for the Built Environment, a research institution at UC, Berkeley.
- Chemical beam epitaxy, a thin film growth method using beams of molecules.
- Chemical and Biochemical Engineering, a branch of engineering dealing with the physical and life sciences.
- College of Built Environments, University of Washington, Seattle, Washington.
- CBE, International Meteor Organization designation for meteor shower Coma Berenicids.
- Collisionless Boltzmann equation in plasma physics and gravitational dynamics.
- Common Base Event, a computing term referring to IBM's implementation of the Web Services Distributed Management (WSDM) Event Format standard.
- Council of Biology Editors, a former name of the Council of Science Editors, who publish the CBE style guide.
- Current Best Estimate, a common expression of related to the highest fidelity value known at the time.

== Honours ==
- Conqueror of the British Empire, a self-awarded title of the Ugandan dictator, Idi Amin.

== Sports ==
- Brazilian Fencing Confederation, or Confederação Brasileira de Esgrima
- College Basketball Experience Classic (CBE Classic), pre-season college basketball tournament.
- Civilization: Beyond Earth, a 2014 video game

== Religion ==
- Christians for Biblical Equality, a Christian organization primarily focused on advocating gender equality.
- Congregation Beth Elohim, a Reform synagogue in Brooklyn, New York founded in 1861

== Other organizations ==
- Communities for a Better Environment
