= Nordic Athletics =

International sports governing body

- Type: Sports federation
- Members: 5 member federations
- Website: nordic-athletics.org

Nordic Athletics is an international governing body for the sport of athletics in the Nordic countries – Denmark, Finland, Iceland, Norway, and Sweden. It is responsible for organising Nordic competitions between the nations, as well as collating Nordic records for the best performances by athletes of the nations, and holding congresses on the sport for technical rules, coaching and sport administration. Membership of the regional body is composed of the five national athletics bodies. The group also serves to influence the International Association of Athletics Federations and European Athletics in regards to Nordic issues.

The earliest regular Nordic competition to be established was the Nordic Marathon Championships and Nordic Combined Events Championships, which were first held in 1949 as a single-host competition. The first full programme event was the Nordic Junior Athletics Championships, an outdoor track and field competition for under-21 athletes, which began in 1950. Several competitions were created and discontinued in the 1960s–1980s, including a full senior programme event in the Nordic Athletics Championships. The 1990s saw three competitions become regular fixtures: the Nordic 10000m Challenge, the Nordic Cross Country Championships, and the Nordic–Baltic Under-23 Athletics Championships. Alongside these events, the Nordic Race Walking Championships, Nordic Indoor Athletics Match, Nordic Junior Athletics Championships and the Nordic Junior Combined Events Championships comprise the ongoing competitions organised by the body.

Since 2008, the organisation has encouraged the involvement of athletes from the Baltic countries (Estonia, Latvia and Lithuania) as both guest athletes and formal competitors.

In July 2019 it began publishing Nordic Athletics Magazine.

== Membership ==
- (Denmark) Danish Athletics Federation
- (Finland) Finnish Amateur Athletic Association
- (Iceland) Icelandic Athletic Federation
- (Norway) Norwegian Athletics Association
- (Sweden) Swedish Athletics Association

== Competitions ==
Competition	Type	Frequency	First year	Final year
Nordic Athletics Championships	outdoor track and field	Biennial	1961	1965
Nordic Indoor Athletics Championships	indoor track and field	Annual	1986	1987
Nordic Indoor Athletics Match	indoor track and field	Annual	2011	
Nordic Women's Cup	women's athletics	Biennial	1974	1982
Nordic 10000m Challenge	10,000 metres	Annual	1997	
Nordic Combined Events Championships	combined track and field events	Annual	1949	1970
Nordic Cross Country Championships	cross country running	Annual	1997	
Nordic Marathon Championships	marathon	Biennial	1949	1981
Nordic Race Walking Championships	racewalking	Annual	1957	
Nordic Indoor Race Walking Championships	racewalking	Biennial	1974	1978
Nordic Junior Race Walking Championships	racewalking	Annual	1966	2003
Nordic–Baltic Under-23 Athletics Championships	under-23 athletics	Biennial	1998	
Nordic Junior Athletics Championships	under-20 athletics	Annual	1950 (as under-21)	
Nordic Junior Combined Events Championships	under-20 combined events	Annual	1969	

== See also ==
- Sport in the Nordic countries
