= Nordic Indoor Championships =

The Nordic Indoor Championships could refer to:

- Nordic Indoor Athletics Championships
- Nordic Indoor Race Walking Championships

== See also ==
- Nordic Championships
