= 2020 Nordic Indoor Athletics Match =

- Edition: 10th
- Dates: 9 February
- Host city: Helsinki, Finland
- Venue: Liikuntamylly
- Level: Senior
- Events: 24
- Participation: 21 nations

The 2020 Nordic Indoor Athletics Match (Norwegian: Nordenkampen 2020) was the 10th edition of the annual indoor track and field competition for athletes from the Nordic countries, organised by Nordic Athletics. It was held on 9 February at Liikuntamylly in Helsinki, Finland.

== Results ==
=== Men ===
Event	Gold		Silver		Bronze	
60 metres	Henrik Larsson (SWE)	6.74	Samuel Purola (FIN)	6.79	Emmanuel Dawlson (SWE)	6.81
200 metres	Mathias Hove Johansen (NOR)	21.27	Erik Annerfalk (SWE)	21.51	Roope Saarinen (FIN)	21.52
400 metres	Carl Bengtström (SWE)	47.31	Erik Back (FIN)	48.05	Fredrik Øvereng (NOR)	48.16
800 metres	Joakim Andersson (SWE)	1:48.38	Andreas Bube (DEN)	1:48.73	Didrik Hexeberg Warlo (NOR)	1:49.64
1500 metres	Narve Gilje Nordås (NOR)	3:45.03	Joonas Rinne (FIN)	3:45.20	Mikkel Dahl-Jessen (DEN)	3:45.84
3000 metres	Simon Sundström (SWE)	8:01.07	Hlynur Andrésson (ISL)	8:01.20	Per Svela (NOR)	8:02.35
60 metres hurdles	Max Hrelja (SWE)	7.87	Jonathan Holm (SWE)	8.03	Ilari Manninen (FIN)	8.13
High jump	Melwin Lycke-Holm (SWE)	2.13 m	Kristján Viggó Sigfinnsson (ISL)	2.11 m	Arttu Mattila (FIN)	2.11 m
Pole vault	Mikko Paavola (FIN)	5.30 m	Eirik Greibrokk Dolve (NOR) Pål Haugen Lillefosse (NOR)	5.30 m	Not awarded	
Long jump	Thobias Montler (SWE)	7.90 m	Sebastian Ree Pedersen (DEN)	7.50 m	Andreas Trajkovski (DEN)	7.46 m
Triple jump	Simo Lipsanen (FIN)	16.36 m	Erik Ehrlin (SWE)	15.60 m	Tuomas Kaukolahti (FIN)	15.53 m
Shot put	Marcus Thomsen (NOR)	20.67 m	Jesper Arbinge (SWE)	18.59 m	Guðni Valur Guðnason (ISL)	18.31 m
Team	Sweden (SWE)	141	Finland (FIN)	108	Norway (NOR)	105.5

=== Women ===
Event	Gold		Silver		Bronze	
60 metres	Lotta Kemppinen (FIN)	7.33	Mathilde Uldall Kramer (DEN)	7.39	Astrid Glenner-Frandsen (DEN)	7.41
200 metres	Elin Östlund (SWE)	23.79	Mette Graversgaard (DEN)	23.79	Elisabeth Slettum (NOR)	23.86
400 metres	Amalie Iuel (NOR)	52.87	Line Kloster (NOR)	54.33	Elise Malmberg (SWE)	54.61
800 metres	Hanna Hermansson (SWE)	2:05.33	Rebecca Högberg (NOR)	2:08.65	Mathilde Diekema Jensen (DEN)	2:10.59
1500 metres	Malin Edland (NOR)	4:17.77	Nathalie Blomqvist (FIN)	4:19.77	Grethe Tyldum (NOR)	4:29.48
3000 metres	Maja Alm (DEN)	9:09.24	Lisa Havell (SWE)	9:17.42	Camilla Richardsson (FIN)	9:18.59
60 metres hurdles	Lotta Harala (FIN)	8.35	Tilde Johansson (SWE)	8.37	Mette Graversgaard (DEN)	8.43
High jump	Tonje Angelsen (NOR)	1.91 m	Sofie Skoog (SWE)	1.82 m	Bianca Salming (SWE)	1.82 m
Pole vault	Wilma Murto (FIN)	4.60 m	Michaela Meijer (SWE)	4.35 m	Elina Lampela (FIN)	4.35 m
Long jump	Erica Jarder (SWE)	6.10 m	Kaiza Karlén (SWE)	6.10 m	Mia Guldteig Lien (NOR)	6.04 m
Triple jump	Senni Salminen (FIN)	13.83 m	Emma Pullola (FIN)	13.43 m	Janne Nielsen (DEN)	13.37 m
Shot put	Fanny Roos (SWE)	17.65 m	Eveliina Rouvali (FIN)	16.15 m	Frida Åkerström (SWE)	15.83 m
Team	Sweden (SWE)	139	Finland (FIN)	114	Denmark (DEN) & Iceland (ISL)	96
