= Kaniecki =

Kaniecki is a Polish surname. Notable people with the surname include:

- Bartosz Kaniecki (born 1988), Polish footballer
- Jarosław Kaniecki (born 1967), Polish athlete
- Krzysztof Kaniecki, Polish athlete
- Michael Joseph Kaniecki (1935–2000), American bishop
