= Nordic Junior Athletics Championships =

International youth athletics competition

- Sport: Track and field
- Founded: 1950
- Country: Finland, Sweden, Norway, Denmark and Iceland

The Nordic Junior Athletics Championships (Norwegian: Nordisk juniormesterskap i friidrett) is an annual outdoor track and field competition for athletes under-20 from the Nordic countries – Sweden, Norway, Finland, Denmark, and Iceland. Athletes must be 19 years of age or younger by December 31 of the year the championship is held. Finland and Sweden have chosen to set a lower age limit of 18, except for athletes competing in relay races only. Norway, Denmark and Iceland have chosen not to have a lower age limit.

The competition was founded in 1950 as the Nordic U21 Junior Match. For much of its early history, it was a competition between Finland, Sweden and Norway only, with that being the arrangement until 1983, with exceptions of the 1962, 1964, and 1979 championships. The competition broadened to include all Nordic states from 1983 onwards, with the exception of the period from 1989-93. The competition was renamed in 2004 to align with the International Association of Athletics Federations definitions of a "junior athlete" as under-20 rather than under-21.

The competition is organised by Nordic Athletics, which also holds the Nordic 10000m Challenge, Nordic Indoor Match and Nordic Cross Country Championships. A separate under-20 event is held for combined track and field events.

== Editions ==
Year	Country	Place	Dates
2004	Finland	Espoo	21–22 August
2005	Norway	Kristiansand	27–28 August
2006	Sweden	Eskilstuna	2–3 September
2007	Denmark	Esbjerg	1–2 September
2008	Norway	Bergen	16–17 August
2009	Finland	Vaasa	22–23 August
2010	Iceland	Akureyri	28–29 August
2011	Denmark	Copenhagen	3–4 September
2012	Sweden	Växjö	18–19 August
2013	Finland	Espoo	17–18 August
2014	Norway	Kristiansand	16–17 August
2015	Finland	Espoo	29–30 August
2016	Iceland	Reykjavík	13–14 August
2017	Sweden	Umeå	19–20 August
2018	Denmark	Hvidovre	11–12 August
2019	Norway	Kristiansand	17–10 August
