= Arne Pedersen (disambiguation) =

Arne Pedersen (1931–2013) was a Norwegian footballer.

Arne Pedersen may refer to:

- Arne Pedersen (cyclist) (1917–2001), Danish cyclist
- Arne Pedersen (shot putter), Norwegian shot putter and medallist at the 1987 Nordic Indoor Athletics Championships

== See also ==
- Arne Petersen
