= OFV =

OFV may refer to:

- Offenburger FV
- Orchid fleck virus
- Opplysningsrådet for Veitrafikken
- Austrian Fencing Federation (Österreichischer Fechtverband)
