= Nordic Junior Race Walking Championships =

International youth race walking competition

- Sport: Racewalking
- Founded: 1966
- Ceased: 2003
- Country: Finland, Sweden, Norway, Denmark and Iceland
- Related competitions: Nordic Race Walking Championships

The Nordic Junior Race Walking Championships (Norwegian: Nordisk juniormesterskap i kappgang) was an annual international racewalking competition between under-20 athletes from the Nordic countries organised by Nordic Athletics. Established in 1966 as a one-day event between Denmark, Finland, Iceland, Norway and Sweden, it became a contest between Finland, Norway and Sweden only in 1999, then had its final edition in 2003, after which point the junior racewalking events were hosted within the main Nordic Race Walking Championships.

== Editions ==
Edition	Year	Dates	Place	Country
1	1966	2 October	Örebro	Sweden
2	1967	18 October	Odense	Denmark
3	1968	7 September	Sävedalen	Sweden
4	1969	13 September	Odense	Denmark
5	1970	26 September	Fredrikstad	Norway
6	1971	11 September	Vretstorp	Sweden
7	1972	29 September	Taivassalo	Finland
8	1973	10–11 August (U20–U17)	Fredrikstad	Norway
8	1973	15 September (U16–U13)	Odense	Denmark
9	1974	14 September	Hallstavik	Sweden
10	1975	12–13 September	Moss	Norway
11	1976	21 August	Naantali	Finland
12	1977	12–13 August	Odense	Denmark
13	1978	26 August	Kisa	Sweden
14	1979	1 September	Bergen	Norway
15	1980	16 August	Greve	Denmark
16	1981	11 August	Vadstena	Sweden
17	1982	21 August	Raisio	Finland
18	1983	20 August	Fredrikstad	Norway
19	1984	1 September	Copenhagen	Denmark
20	1985	13 July	Falkenberg	Sweden
21	1986	30 August	Pihtipudas	Finland
22	1987	1 August	Kyrksæterøra	Norway
23	1988	20 August	Randers	Denmark
24	1989	5 August	Äppelbo	Sweden
25	1990	8 June	Vantaa	Finland
26	1991	3 August	Moss	Norway
27	1992	1 August	Randers	Denmark
28	1993	11 September	Östhammar	Sweden
29	1994	6 August	Vantaa	Finland
30	1995	24 June	Oslo	Norway
31	1996	3 August	Herning	Denmark
32	1997	2 August	Södertälje	Sweden
33	1998	27 June	Laitila	Finland
34	1999	22 May	Bergen	Norway
35	2000	2 July	Lapinlahti	Finland
36	2001	16 June	Gothenburg	Sweden
37	2002	31 August	Fredrikstad	Norway
38	2003	29 June	Kauhava	Finland
