= Simon Sundström =

Swedish athlete

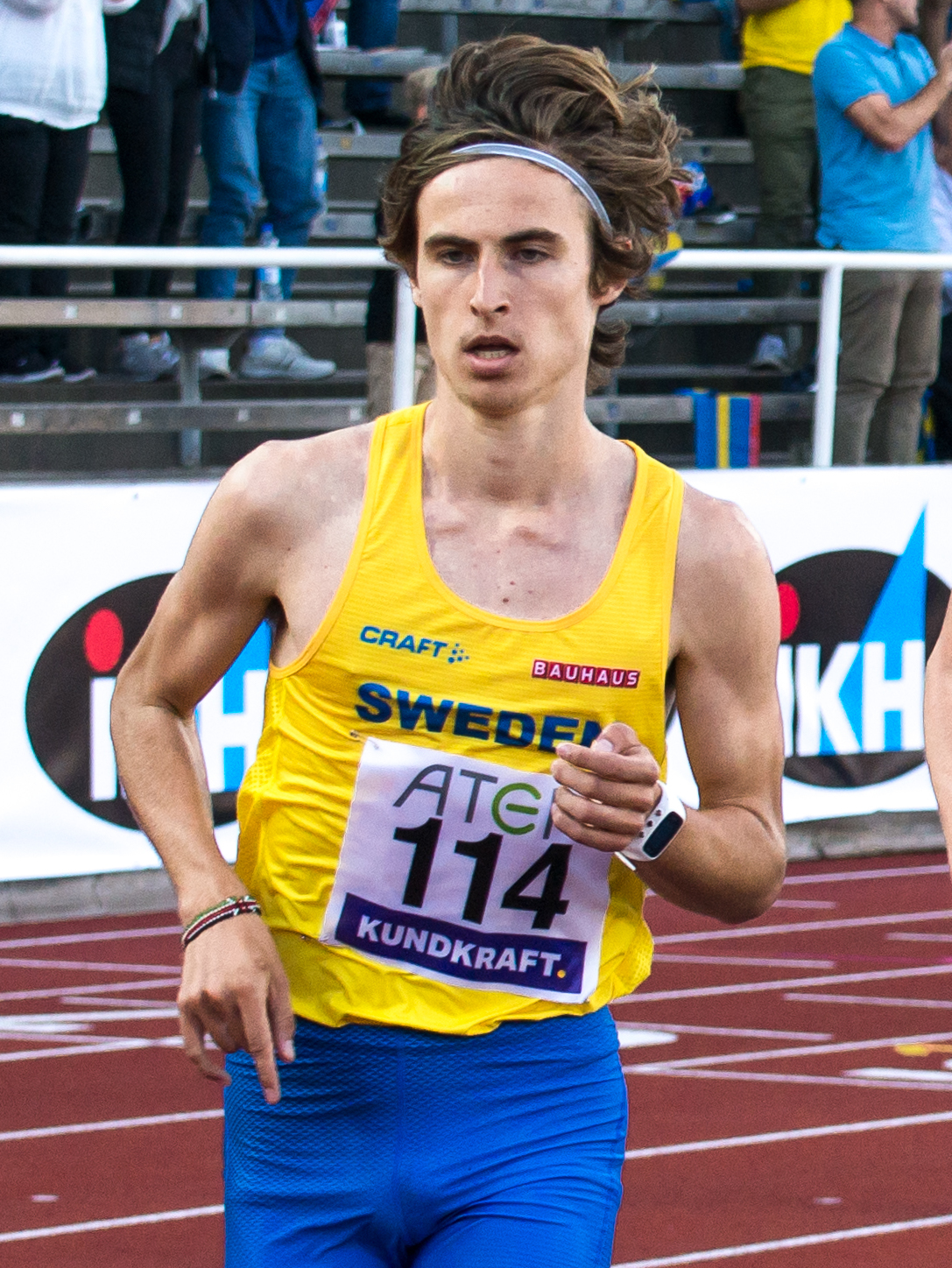
- Sundström in 2019

Personal information
- Born: 4 February 1998 (age 28)

Sport
- Sport: Track and field
- Events: Middle-distance, steeplechase
- Club: Djurgårdens IF

Simon Sundström (born 4 February 1998) is a Swedish athlete who competes in the steeplechase. He is a multiple-time national champion and competed at the 2020 Olympic Games.

== Biography ==
Sundström participated in the 2,000m steeplechase in July 2015 at the Youth World Championships in Cali, Colombia.

At the junior European Championships in Grosseto, Italy in 2017, Sundström participated in the 3,000m steeplechase and finished in sixth place overall.

In 2019, Simon Sundström ran the 3,000m steeplechase at the 2019 European Athletics U23 Championships in Gävle. He won his trial heat and took a bronze medal in the final.

He won the 3000 metres at the 2020 Nordic Indoor Athletics Match. He competed at the delayed 2020 Summer Olympics in Tokyo, Japan in 2021, in the men's 3000 metres steeplechase.

He competed at the 2022 European Athletics Championships in Munich, Germany in August 2022, in the men's 3000 metres steeplechase, but did not qualify for the final.

He competed in the 3000 metres at the 2023 European Athletics Indoor Championships in Istanbul, Turkey where he qualified for the final and placed thirteenth overall. He ran a personal best of 8:20.10 at the 2023 World Athletics Championships in Budapest, Hungary, qualifying for the final and placing fifteenth overall.

He competed over 10,000 metres at the 2024 European Athletics Championships in Rome, Italy. At the same Championships, he also competed at the 3000m steeplechase. He qualified through ranking for the 2024 Olympic Games but was one of a number of Swedish athletes not selected by the federation for the Games.

Sundström represented IFK Lidingö until November 2024, when he joined Djurgårdens IF together with Andreas Kramer and Saga Provci.

In August 2026, he competed at the 2026 European Athletics Championships in Birmingham, England, in the 3000 metres steeplechase.

== Personal life ==
In December 2023, he was awarded the Stora grabbars och tjejers märke.
