= 1987 Nordic Indoor Athletics Championships =

- Host city: Oslo, Norway
- Level: Senior
- Type: Outdoor

The 1987 Nordic Indoor Athletics Championships was the second and final edition of the international indoor athletics competition between Nordic countries and was held in Oslo, Norway. It consisted of 22 individual track and field events, 12 for men and 10 for women.

Finland won the most golds for a second year, at nine. Sweden won the most medals overall at 23. The hosts Norway had the second highest medal haul at 21, while Denmark managed only two medals. Two women won medals in two events: Ringa Ropo of Finland won minor medals in the women's jumps and 800 metres champion Maiken Sørum also won a 1500 metres bronze.

== Medal summary ==
=== Men ===
Event	Gold		Silver		Bronze	
60 metres	Robert Nilsson (SWE)	6.82	Jouni Myllymäki (FIN)	6.83	Harri Nevavuo (FIN)	6.83
200 metres	Svein Erik Storlien (NOR)	22.14	Marko Granat (SWE)	22.38	Vidar Jakobsen (NOR)	22.68
400 metres	Ulf Sedlacek (SWE)	48.45	Peter Johansson (SWE)	48.90	Niklas Wallenlind (SWE)	49.10
800 metres	Ronny Olsson (SWE)	1:51.58	Martin Enholm (SWE)	1:52.30	Morten Jurs (NOR)	1:52.69
1500 metres	Ari Suhonen (FIN)	3:49.84	Mika Maaskola (FIN)	3:50.25	Johnny Kroon (SWE)	3:50.57
3000 metres	Risto Ulmala (FIN)	8:05.97	Knut Hegvold (NOR)	8:06.34	Dan Bergkvist (SWE)	8:11.76
60 m hurdles	Arto Bryggare (FIN)	7.64	Ulf Söderman (SWE)	7.84	Erik Jensen (DEN)	7.99
High jump	Mikko Levola (FIN)	2.15 m	Lasse Gimnes (NOR) Michael Mikkelsen (DEN)	2.09 m	Not awarded	
Pole vault	Arto Peltoniemi (FIN)	5.40 m	Harri Palola (FIN)	5.25 m	Veijo Vanneslouma (FIN)	5.15 m
Long jump	Jarmo Kärnä (FIN)	7.81 m	Juha Plosila (FIN)	7.76 m	Lars Hansen (NOR)	7.52 m
Triple jump	Arne Holm (SWE)	16.72 m	Markku Rokala (FIN)	15.74 m	Claes Rahm (SWE)	15.55 m
Shot put	Jan Sagedal (NOR)	19.96 m	Janne Ronkainen (FIN)	18.38 m	Arne Pedersen (NOR)	18.17 m

=== Women ===
Event	Gold		Silver		Bronze	
60 metres	Sisko Markkanen (FIN)	7.45	Lena Möller (SWE)	7.47	Mette Husbyn (NOR)	7.50
200 metres	Maria Fernström (SWE)	24.55	Christina Wennberg (SWE)	24.85	Marianne Drivdal (NOR)	24.91
400 metres	Ann-Louise Skoglund (SWE)	53.78	Monica Strand (SWE)	55.39	Lisbeth Andersen (NOR)	55.65
800 metres	Maiken Sørum (NOR)	2:08.26	Jill McCabe (SWE)	2:08.52	Toril Hatling (NOR)	2:08.83
1500 metres	Christin Sørum (NOR)	4:17.15	Anne Jorun Rakstad (NOR)	4:17.31	Maiken Sørum (NOR)	4:17.32
3000 metres	Satu Levelä (FIN)	9:17.77	Anita Håkenstad (NOR)	9:19.16	Tuija Jousimaa (FIN)	9:27.14
3000 metres	Karin Malmbratt (SWE)	8.29	Anne Beth Espetvedt (NOR)	8.37	Helena Fernström (SWE)	8.51
High jump	Hanne Haugland (NOR)	1.91 m	Christina Nordström (SWE)	1.84 m	Ringa Ropo (FIN)	1.84 m
Long jump	Arja Jussila (FIN)	6.45 m	Ringa Ropo (FIN)	6.44 m	Christina Sundberg (SWE)	6.13 m
Shot put	Stine Lerdahl (NOR)	15.16 m	Caroline Isgren (SWE)	15.04 m	Grete Gjermshus (NOR)	14.89 m

== Medal table ==
Rank	Nation	Gold	Silver	Bronze	Total
1	Finland (FIN)	9	7	4	20
2	Sweden (SWE)	7	10	6	23
3	Norway (NOR)	6	5	10	21
4	Denmark (DEN)	0	1	1	2
Totals (4 entries)		22	23	21	66
