= International Fencing Federation =

International fencing governing body

Fédération Internationale d'Escrime
- Sport: Fencing
- Founded: 29 November 1913; 112 years ago in Paris, France
- President: (Egypt) Abdel Monem El-Husseiny (interim)
- Countries: 155
- Headquarters: Lausanne, Switzerland
- Website: FIE.org

The International Fencing Federation (Fédération Internationale d'Escrime) commonly known by the acronym FIE, is the international governing body of Olympic fencing. Today, its head office is at the Maison du Sport International in Lausanne, Switzerland. The FIE is composed of 155 national federations, each of which is recognized by its country's Olympic Committee as the sole representative of Olympic-style fencing in that country.

== History ==
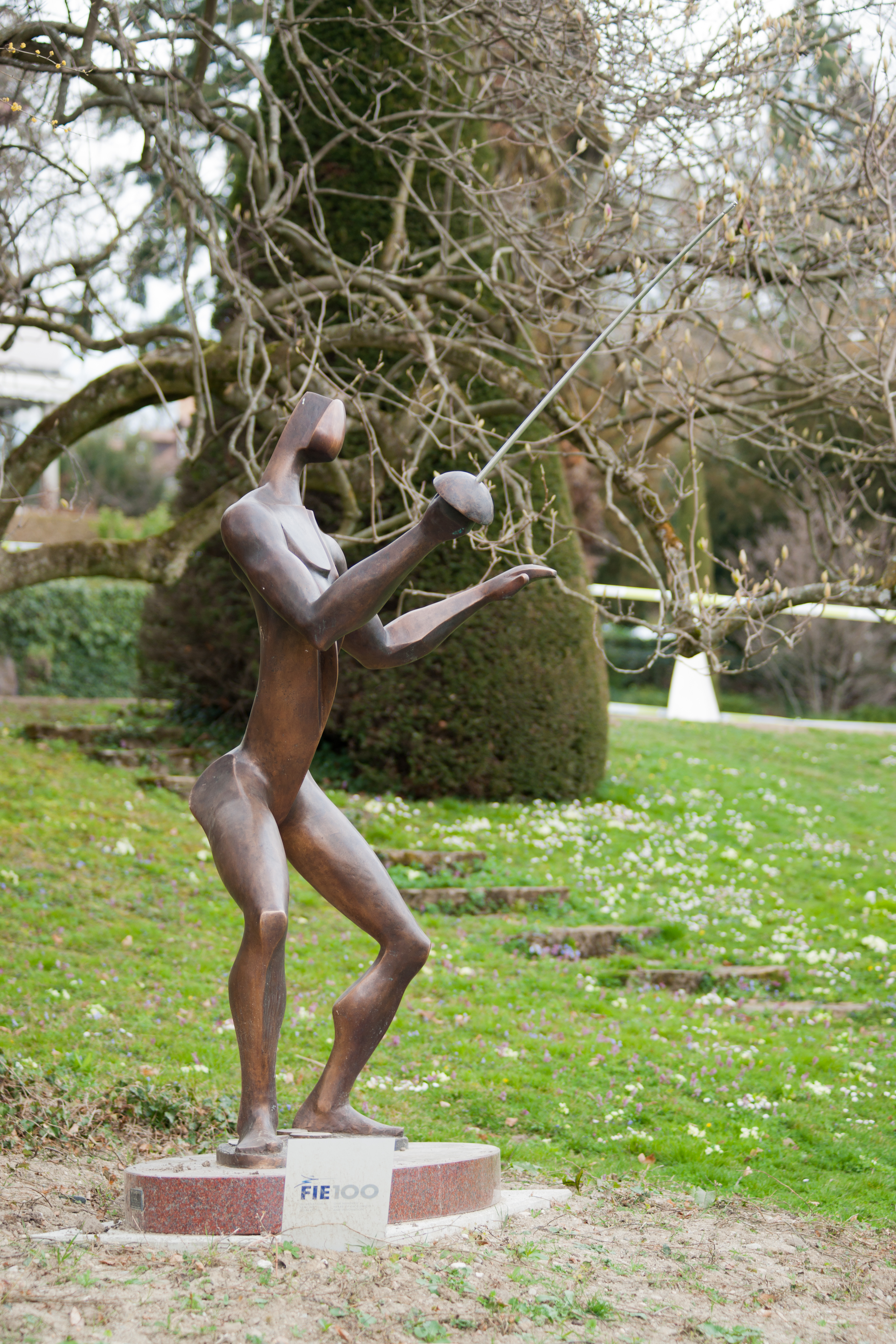
Allegory of fencing by Václav Česák, presented to the Olympic Museum by the International Fencing Federation in celebration of its centenary

The International Fencing Federation (Fédération Internationale d'Escrime) is the heir of the Société d'encouragement de l'escrime founded in France in 1882, which took part in the global movement of structuring sport. The first international fencing congress was held in Brussels, Belgium in 1897 at the instigation of the Fédération belge des cercles d'escrime, followed by another one in Paris in 1900. On this occasion the Société organised one of the first international fencing events; French, Italian, Spanish, and Belgian fencers attended the competition. Dissensions rapidly arose between épéeists and foilists, which held the majority at the Société. The third congress held in Brussels in 1905 voted the creation of an international fencing committee whose mission would be of fostering friendship amongst all fencers, establishing national rules, and supporting the organization of fencing competitions. The third congress also adopted the French rules as the basis for upcoming international competitions. New tensions appeared, this time between France and Italy, about the regulatory weapon grip. They led to the boycott by France of the fencing events of the 1912 Olympic Games.

A new international congress was called together in Ghent, Belgium, in July 1913. The main matter was the adoption of international regulations for each of the three weapons. The French rules were adopted in épée and foil; the Hungarian rules were chosen for sabre. Frenchman René Lacroix also campaigned for the creation of an international fencing federation.

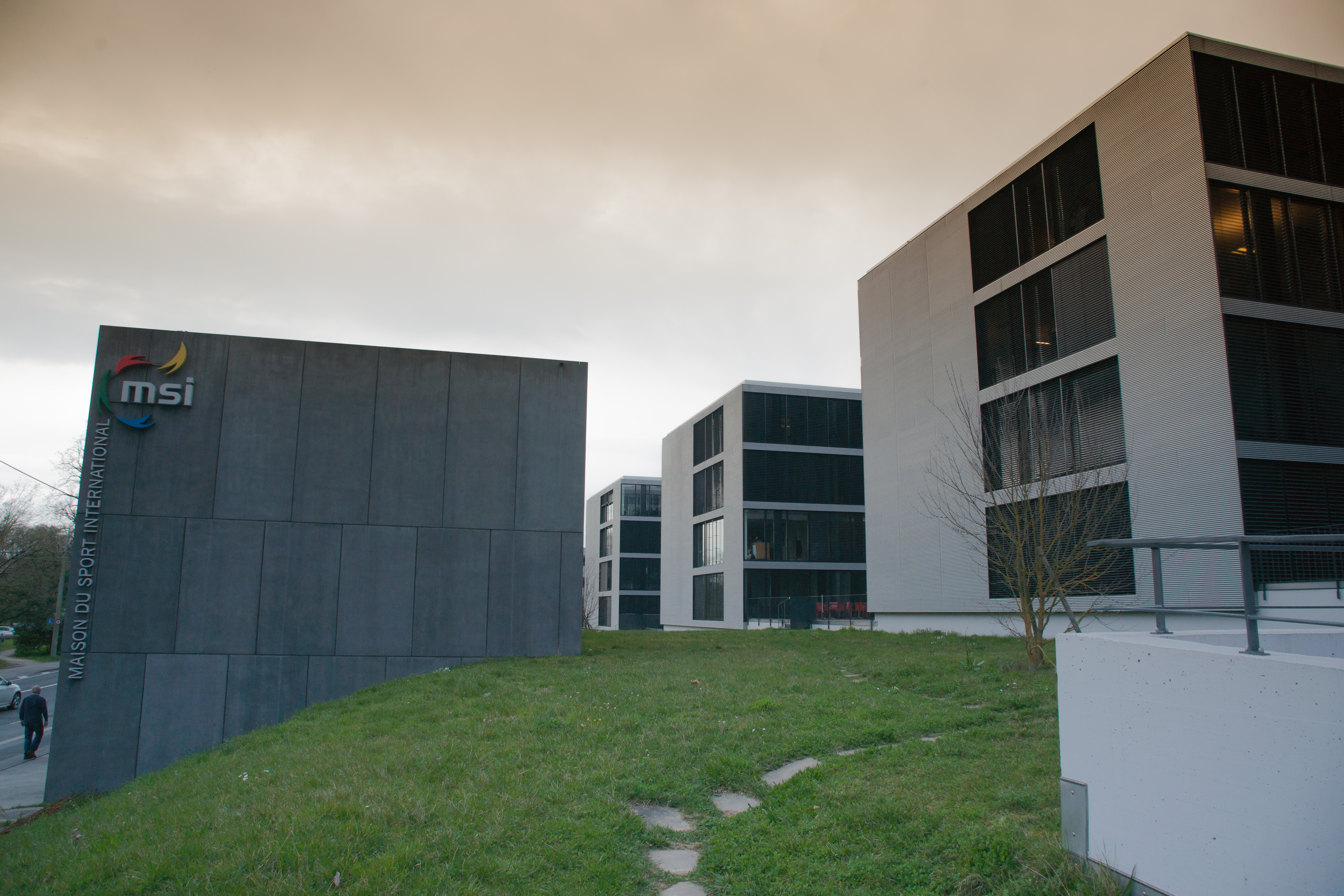
Headquarters of the FIE at the Maison du Sport International in Lausanne

The International Fencing Federation (Fédération Internationale d'Escrime) was founded on 29 November 1913, in the conference rooms of the Automobile Club de France in Paris. The nine founding nations were Belgium, the Kingdom of Bohemia (now the Czech Republic), France, the United Kingdom, Hungary, Italy, the Netherlands, and Norway. Albert Feyerick, president of the Federation of fencing clubs of Belgium, was elected as the first president. The FIE held its first congress on 23 June 1914, and accepted the adhesion of seven new countries: Austria, Denmark, Monaco, Romania, Russia, Switzerland, and the United States.

=== Presidency of Alisher Usmanov ===
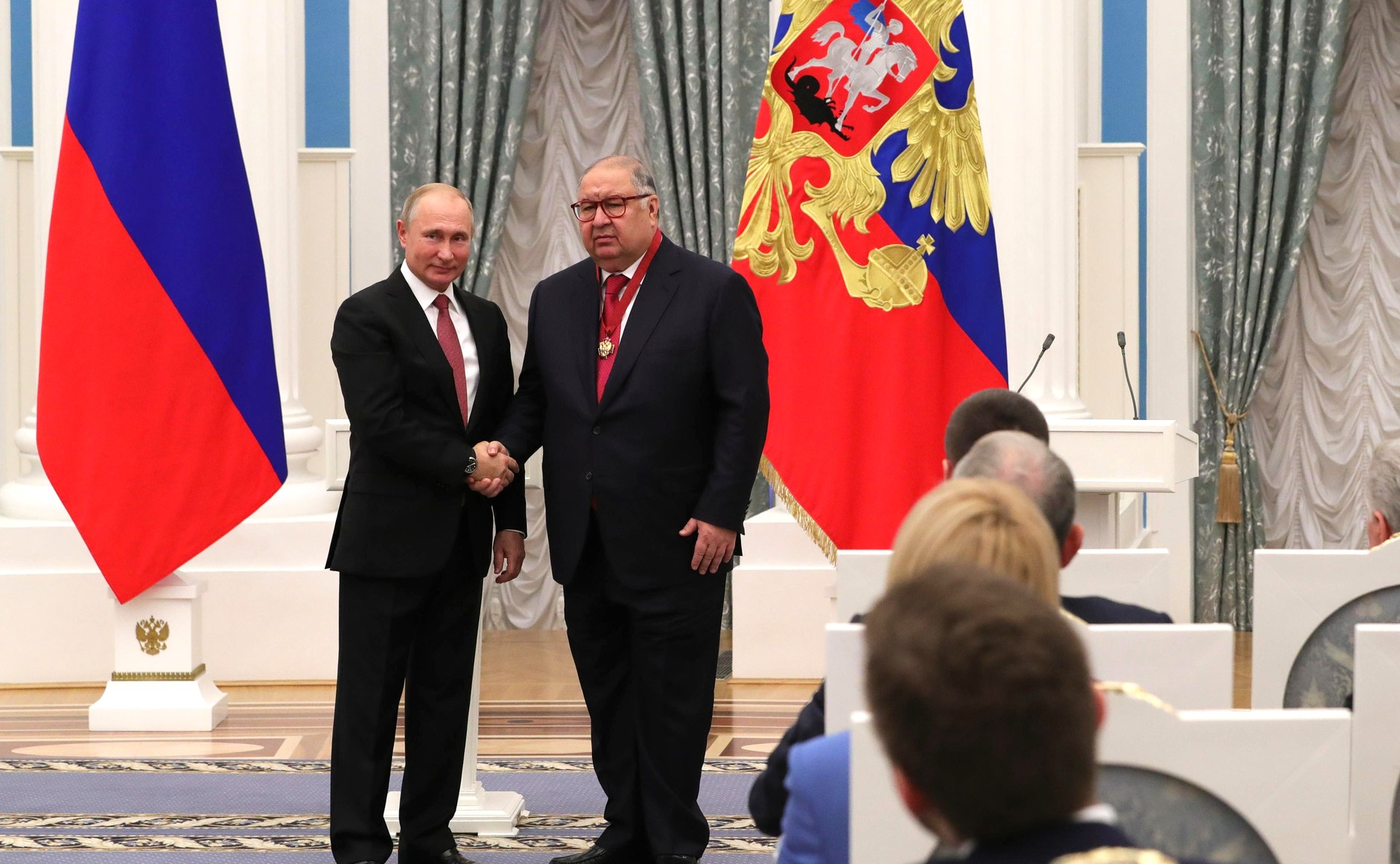
FIE president Alisher Usmanov with Vladimir Putin.

Russian oligarch Alisher Usmanov was elected president of the FIE in 2008 with 66 votes to 61 for incumbent president René Roch. He was re-elected in 2012 and 2016. In 2021, Usmanov was re-elected by acclamation to a fourth term, for which he was congratulated by Vladimir Putin.

On 28 February 2022, in reaction to the Russian invasion of Ukraine, the European Union blacklisted Usmanov, imposing an EU-wide travel ban on him and freezing all of his assets. The EU stated: "He has been referred to as one of Vladimir Putin's favourite oligarchs." Following the imposition of the sanctions on him, Usmanov announced on 1 March 2022, in an accusatory letter, that he was stepping down as FIE President. On 30 November 2024, he was re-elected to the office for another term.

=== Impact of the Russian invasion of Ukraine ===
In response to the Russian invasion of Ukraine in late February 2022, the FIE agreed with the European Fencing Confederation (EFC) to ban Russian and Belarusian fencers, and reallocated competitions that were due to be held in Russia and Belarus.

On 10 March 2023, the FIE became the first Olympic governing body to officially reinstate Russian and Belarusian athletes and officials, in time for the start of the qualification for the 2024 Summer Olympics. Protesting this decision, Denmark, France, Germany, and Poland cancelled upcoming World Cup fencing events to prevent Russians and Belarusians from participating.

In April 2023, it was revealed that the European Fencing Confederation had sent a critical letter to the FIE, outlining their opposition to the FIE's plans to strip the countries that had indicated they would not grant visas to Russians and Belarusians from hosting rights, and impose sanctions on them. In addition, the EFC approved in congress in June 2023 that no Russian or Belarusian coach or athlete may compete in an EFC competition, and that Russia and Belarus are suspended as members. Over 200 fencers also signed an open letter in which they objected to the FIE's decision to allow the return of Russian and Belarusian fencers as neutrals. In May 2023, the FIE decided to strip individual events at the 2023 European Games in Kraków-Małopolska of their Olympic qualifier status because the Polish organizers banned Russians from participating at the Games, and therefore they organized instead a separate European Championships in Plovdiv for individual events only where Russians were allowed to compete. The Nordic Fencing Union heavily criticized these decisions by the FIE.

In December 2025, FIE has decided to allow Russian junior athletes to participate in international competitions in the respective categories under their national flag and with the national anthem.

In June 2026, all Russian athletes, junior and senior, were allowed to compete in international competitions under their national flag and with the national anthem.

=== Disqualification of Ukrainian world champion, and subsequent reversal ===
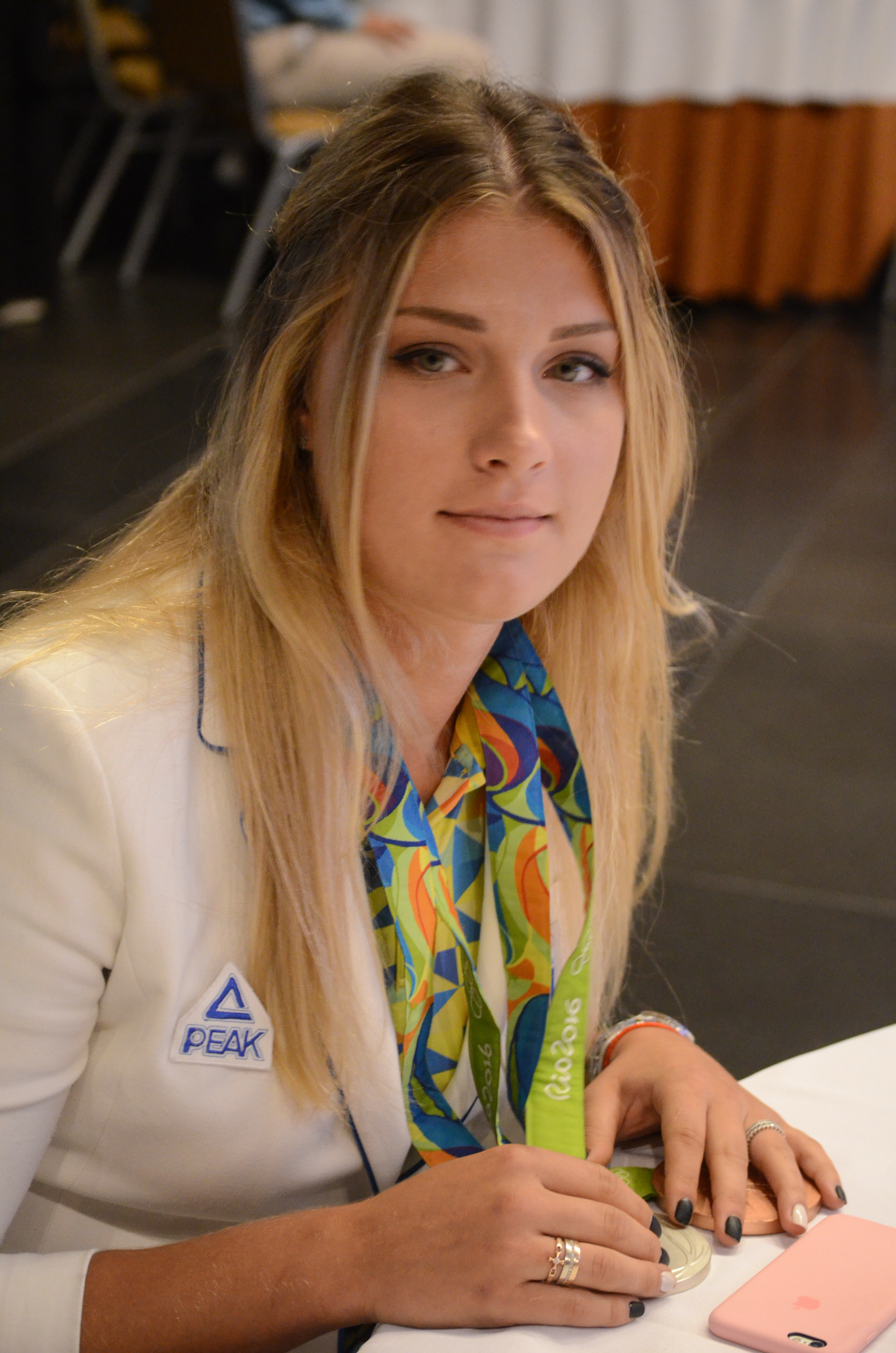
Ukrainian four-time world sabre champion Olga Kharlan

In July 2023, Ukrainian four-time individual world sabre champion Olga Kharlan was disqualified by the FIE at the World Fencing Championships. Kharlan defeated Russian Anna Smirnova 15–7. At the time, and since 1 July 2020 (and reconfirmed by FIE public notice in September 2020 and in January 2021), by public written notice the FIE had replaced its previous handshake requirement with a "salute" by the opposing fencers, and written in its public notice that handshakes were "suspended until further notice." Smirnova extended her hand to Kharlan, who in turn extended her saber in an offer to the Russian to tap blades. Kharlan said her choice of salute was meant as a sign of respect for her opponent, while still acknowledging the ongoing conflict between Ukraine and Russia. After a long delay during which Smirnova protested and sat on the strip for 45 minutes, Kharlan was ultimately black-carded and eliminated from the championship by FIE officials. The Russian had been allowed to compete as a neutral athlete. The Ukrainian delegation filed an appeal. The German Fencing Federation criticized the decision by the FIE and maintained that the very strict interpretation of the rules sent a fatal signal far beyond the world of fencing.

The FIE came under fire for its decision. Ukrainian tennis player Elina Svitolina called the FIE's disqualification “disrespectful” towards Ukrainians. Mykhailo Podolyak, adviser to Ukraine president Volodymyr Zelenskyy, called the FIE decision "absolutely shameful," and posted a photo on his Twitter feed which appeared to show the Russian fencer smiling and flashing the victory sign with a Russian soldier, writing: "The photo features ... the Russian fencer.... As you can see, she openly admires the Russian army.... The [FIE] disqualified the Ukrainian representative for not shaking hands with the Russian." Kharlan said "This federation will never change." Team USA head coach Yury Gelman said that the FIE was the most corrupt federation in the world.

The IOC strongly disagreed with the FIE's actions. On 28 July at the behest of the Comité international olympique, the FIE reversed itself and cancelled its disqualification of Kharlan, making it possible for her to enter the team women's sabre event on 29 July, while at the same time arguing that "The FIE stands fully behind the penalty, which, after a thorough review, is in complete accordance and compliance with its official rules and associated penalties." Kharlan was also told by the IOC in an empathic letter on which the FIE president was copied that due to the circumstances she was being granted automatic qualification into the 2024 Paris Olympics, and that she should "[r]est assured that the IOC will continue to stand in full solidarity with the Ukrainian athletes and the Olympic community of Ukraine during these extremely difficult times." Subsequently, though the FIE had defended its position in its interim president's letter to Kharlan, Bruno Gares, the FIE's representative of the executive committee in the Rules Commission said that—after the required salutes at the end of a bout—handshakes would become optional, with a distance greeting permitted instead.

=== 2026 European Fencing Championship controversy ===
In January 2026, Estonia was stripped of hosting rights of the 2026 European Fencing Championship by FIE, which had been granted in 2024, due to the country's refusal to allow the participation of Russian and Belarusian athletes.

== Events ==
Competitions organized by the FIE include the senior World Championships and World Cup, the Junior World Championships and Junior World Cup, the Cadets World Championships, and the Veterans World Championships. The Zonal Championships recognised by the FIE are the Senior Zonal Championships and the Junior Zonal Championships, but other competitions may be organized by the Zonal Confederations.

The FIE assists the International Olympic Committee in the organization of fencing events at the Summer Olympics. The number of events has been a matter of contention between the FIE and the CIO since the introduction of the women's sabre at the 1999 World Championships: since then, the World Championships feature twelve events: an individual and a team weapon for each of the three weapons, for men and for women. However, the CIO refuses to increase the number of Olympic medals allocated to fencing. After much dithering, the FIE decided to organize all six individual events, but only four team events, decided on a rotational basis. The two team events excluded from the Olympic programme, one for men and one for women, are included instead in the World Championships.

== People ==
=== Presidents of the FIE ===
A list of FIE presidents from 1913 to the present:

- 1913–21: Albert Feyerick
- 1921–24: André Maginot
- 1925–28: George van Rossem
- 1929–32: Eugène Empeyta
- 1933–48: Paul Anspach
- 1949–52: Jacques Coutrot
- 1953–56: Giuseppe Mazzini
- 1957–60: Pierre Ferri
- 1961–64: Miguel de Capriles
- 1965–80: Pierre Ferri
- 1981–84: Giancarlo Brusati
- 1984–92: Rolland Boitelle
- 1993–2008: René Roch
- 2008–22: Alisher Usmanov
- 2022–24: Emmanuel Katsiadakis (interim president)
- 2024–25: Alisher Usmanov
- 2025-date: Abdel Monem El-Husseini (interim president)

== Continental federations ==
As of 2023, the FIE recognized 155 affiliated national federations.

Africa (CAE)	America (CPE)	Asia (FCA)	Europe (CEE)	Oceania (OFC)
Algeria; Angola; Benin; Botswana; Burkina Faso; Cameroon; Cape Verde; Republic of the Congo; Democratic Republic of the Congo; Egypt; Gabon; Ghana; Guinea; Ivory Coast; Kenya; Libya; Madagascar; Mali; Mauritania; Mauritius; Morocco; Namibia; Niger; Nigeria; Rwanda; Senegal; Sierra Leone; South Africa; Togo; Tunisia; Uganda	Antigua and Barbuda; Argentina; Aruba (The Bahamas) Bahamas; Barbados; Belize; Bermuda; Bolivia; Brazil; Canada; Chile; Colombia; Costa Rica; Cuba; Dominica; Dominican Republic; Ecuador; El Salvador; Guatemala; Guyana; Haiti; Honduras; Jamaica; Mexico; Nicaragua; Panama; Paraguay; Peru; Puerto Rico; United States; United States Virgin Islands; Uruguay; Venezuela	Afghanistan; Bahrain; Bangladesh; Brunei; Cambodia; China; Chinese Taipei; Hong Kong; India; Indonesia; Iran; Iraq; Japan; Jordan; Kazakhstan; Kuwait; Kyrgyzstan; Lebanon; Macau; Malaysia; Mongolia; Myanmar; Nepal; North Korea; Oman; Pakistan; Palestine; Philippines; Qatar; Saudi Arabia; Singapore; South Korea; Sri Lanka; Syria; Tajikistan; Thailand; Turkmenistan; United Arab Emirates; Uzbekistan; Vietnam; Yemen	Albania; Armenia; Austria; Azerbaijan; Belarus; Belgium; Bulgaria; Croatia; Cyprus; Czech Republic; Denmark; Estonia; Finland; France (Georgia (country)) Georgia; Germany (United Kingdom) Great Britain; Greece; Hungary; Iceland (Republic of Ireland) Ireland; Israel; Italy; Latvia; Lithuania; Luxembourg; Malta; Moldova; Monaco; Netherlands; North Macedonia; Norway; Poland; Portugal; Romania; Russia; San Marino; Serbia; Slovakia; Slovenia; Spain; Sweden; Switzerland; Turkey; Ukraine	American Samoa; Australia; Guam; New Zealand; Papua New Guinea; Samoa

Note: As of 7 July 2012, the Netherlands Antilles was still listed as an FIE Member nation, and 146 member nations were listed on the FIE's membership page. However, after the country was dissolved, it lost its National Olympic Committee status in 2011. At the 2012 Olympics, athletes from the former Netherlands Antilles were eligible to participate as independent athletes under the Olympic flag (no fencers competed).
