= 1986 Nordic Indoor Athletics Championships =

- Host city: Lidingö, Sweden
- Level: Senior
- Type: Outdoor

The 1986 Nordic Indoor Athletics Championships was the inaugural edition of the international indoor athletics competition between Nordic countries and was held in Lidingö, Sweden. It consisted of 22 individual track and field events, 12 for men and 10 for women.

Finland was the most successful nation, taking ten golds in a total haul of 30 medals. Sweden placed second with ten golds among their 21 medals. Denmark won four medals, two of them gold, while Norway won ten medals, though none were gold. Maria Fernström of Sweden was the most successful athlete of the tournament, winning a women's

== Medal summary ==
=== Men ===
Event	Gold		Silver		Bronze	
60 metres	Peter Regli (DEN)	6.85	Harri Nevavuo (FIN)	6.91	Jari Ketola (SWE)	6.94
200 metres	Juha Pyy (FIN)	21.33	Lars Pedersen (DEN)	21.37	Robert Nilsson (SWE)	22.00
400 metres	Jari-Pekka Mikkola (FIN)	48.63	Timo Kiviniemi (FIN)	48.82	Ulf Sedlacek (SWE)	48.90
800 metres	Ari Suhonen (FIN)	1:50.52	Jens Østengård (DEN)	1:51.01	Jussi Riihelä (FIN)	1:51.83
1500 metres	Johan Engholm (SWE)	3:45.93	Ari Paunonen (FIN)	3:46.07	Lars Stene (NOR)	3:46.39
3000 metres	Jyrki Ojennus (FIN)	8:06.14	Stig Roar Husby (NOR)	8:06.33	Dag Øxnevad (NOR)	8:08.16
60 m hurdles	Ulf Söderman (SWE)	7.95	Mikael Ylöstalo (FIN)	8.01	Petter Hesselberg (NOR)	8.03
High jump	Ari Laitinen (FIN)	2.13 m	Jan Langøy (NOR)	2.10 m	Matti Viitala (FIN)	2.10 m
Pole vault	Miro Zalar (SWE)	5.45 m	Tapani Haapakoski (FIN)	5.35 m	Asko Peltoniemi (FIN)	5.25 m
Long jump	Juha Kivi (FIN)	7.71 m	Jarmo Kärnä (FIN)	7.60 m	Lars Hansen (NOR)	7.52 m
Triple jump	Arne Holm (SWE)	16.61 m	Claes Rahm (SWE)	16.44 m	Timo Utriainen (FIN)	15.95 m
Shot put	Anders Skärvstrand (SWE)	19.48 m	Per Nilsson (SWE)	17.81 m	Kari Töyrylä (FIN)	17.66 m

=== Women ===
Event	Gold		Silver		Bronze	
60 metres	Maria Fernström (SWE)	7.48	Mette Husbyn (NOR)	7.52	Sisko Markkanen (FIN)	7.57
200 metres	Maria Fernström (SWE)	24.07	Sølvi Olsen (NOR)	24.68	Sisko Markkanen (FIN)	24.85
400 metres	Ann-Louise Skoglund (SWE)	52.88	Monica Strand (SWE)	55.38	Anne Halldin (SWE)	55.93
800 metres	Teija Virkberg (FIN)	2:10.20	Ann-Cathrin Tveter (NOR)	2:10.40	Toril Hatling (NOR)	2:10.65
1500 metres	Monica Magnusson (SWE)	4:24.64	Minna Mäkelä (FIN)	4:30.12	Birgitta Nyholm (FIN)	4:32.12
3000 metres	Raija Huttunen (FIN)	9:44.04	Karin Lindberg (SWE)	9:44.22	Only 2 starters	
60 m hurdles	Tiina Lindgren (FIN)	8.49	Kristina Rosenquist (SWE)	8.50	Saila Purho (FIN)	8.52
High jump	Susanne Lorentzon (SWE)	1.87 m	Niina Vihanto (FIN)	1.85 m	Sari Karjalainen (FIN)	1.82 m
Long jump	Lene Demsitz (DEN)	6.41 m	Arja Jussila (FIN)	6.23 m	Lena Wallin (SWE)	6.16 m
Shot put	Asta Hovi (FIN)	17.16 m	Satu Sulkio (FIN)	15.90 m	Caroline Isgren (SWE)	14.66 m

== Medal table ==
Rank	Nation	Gold	Silver	Bronze	Total
1	Finland (FIN)	10	10	10	30
2	Sweden (SWE)	10	5	6	21
3	Denmark (DEN)	2	2	0	4
4	Norway (NOR)	0	5	5	10
Totals (4 entries)		22	22	21	65
