= Fencing Federation of South Africa =

- Sport: Fencing
- Jurisdiction: South Africa
- Abbreviation: FFSA
- Affiliation: FIE
- Regional affiliation: CAE
- Headquarters: Pretoria
- Location: 19 Elephant Road, Monument Park, Pretoria, 0181
- President: Mike Stafford

Official website
- www.safencer.co.za
- (South Africa)

The Fencing Federation of South Africa is the governing body that regulates and oversee the Olympic sport of fencing in South Africa. Affiliated to the South African Sports Confederation and Olympic Committee, the body is responsible for organizing fencing competitions locally and selecting fencers for international competitions.

== History ==
Fencing initially started growing as a sport in South Africa in 1898, when a club known as "De Vrije Wapenbroeders", was founded in Pretoria. Boer prisoners on St Helena started a fencing association called De Wapenbroeders, on 21 August 1901 headed by an erstwhile tutor of the pre-war Pretoria outfit, H. A. de Haas

The South African Fencing Association was established in 1907, and Walter Gates emerged as the first South African to participate in the fencing event at the 1908 Olympics. Competitive fencing developed before the beginning of World War I and only got reestablished in the 1930s. Subsequent to World War II fencing started to flourish and the Cape and Transvaal Amateur Fencing Associations were established in 1949.

The South African Amateur Fencing Association (SAAFA) was also formed in 1949, and became affiliated to the South African Olympic Games Association and the world governing body, the International Fencing Federation (FIE) in 1950. Subsequently, the Natal and Orange Free State Fencing Associations were established and became affiliated to SAAFA.

== See also ==
- Fencing in Namibia
