= Nordic Combined Events Championships =

- Sport: Combined track and field events
- Founded: 1949
- Ceased: 1970
- Country: Finland, Sweden, Norway, Denmark and Iceland

The Nordic Combined Events Championships (Norwegian: Nordisk mesterskap i mangekamp) was an annual two-day competition in combined track and field events between athletes from the Nordic countries organised by Nordic Athletics. Established in 1949 as a biennial event, it lasted for ten editions before holding the last competition in 1970. Men competed in the decathlon and women competed in the pentathlon. The competition was hosted alongside the Nordic Marathon Championships. The stand-alone event was merged into the main Nordic Athletics Championships competition from 1961 to 1965.

A junior category was incorporated into the 1969 championships and when the senior event was cancelled, the junior event was established in its own right as the annual Nordic Junior Combined Events Championships.

Separate from this competition, a Nordic Pentathlon Championship was also contested as part of the Nordic Women's Cup in 1976.

== Editions ==
Edition	Year	City	Country	Date	No. of athletes	No. of nations
1st	1949	Stockholm	Sweden	9–10 September		
2nd	1951	Tampere	Finland	2–3 August		
3rd	1953	Oslo	Norway	5–6 September		
4th	1955	Copenhagen	Denmark	3–4 September		
5th	1957	Gothenburg	Sweden	21–22 September		
6th	1959	Pori	Finland	29–30 August		
7th	1961	Oslo	Norway	31 July–2 August		
8th	1963	Gothenburg	Sweden	21–22 September		
9th	1965	Helsinki	Finland	15–16 August		
10th	1967	Copenhagen	Denmark	16–17 September		
11th	1968	Reykjavík	Iceland	6–7 July		
12th	1969	Kongsvinger	Norway	28–29 June		
13th	1970	Sollentuna	Sweden	28–29 August		
