= Brazilian Fencing Confederation =

Sports governing body in Brazil

- Sport: Fencing
- Jurisdiction: Brazil
- Abbreviation: CBE
- Founded: 1927
- Affiliation: FIE
- Regional affiliation: PAFC
- Headquarters: Rio de Janeiro, Brazil
- President: Gerli dos Santos

Official website
- www.brasilesgrima.com.br
- (Brazil)

The Brazilian Fencing Confederation (Portuguese: Confederação Brasileira de Esgrima (CBE)) is the national organization responsible for managing and promoting the sport of fencing in Brazil. The CBE was founded in 1927 and is headquartered in Rio de Janeiro.

The CBE is affiliated with the International Fencing Federation. Its president is Gerli dos Santos, and its vice president is Ricardo Machado Pacheco.
