= Nordic Women's Cup =

Biennial track and field competition

- Sport: women's athletics
- Founded: 1974
- Ceased: 1982
- Country: Finland, Sweden, Norway, Denmark and Iceland

The Nordic Women's Cup was a biennial competition in women's track and field between athletes from the Nordic countries organised by Nordic Athletics. Established in 1974, it lasted for five editions before holding the last competition in 1982. The competition was held in June or July in even-numbered years. Each of the five Nordic countries – Denmark, Finland, Iceland, Norway, and Sweden – hosted the competition during its lifetime.

The event programme included the women's pentathlon in 1976 – the medallists were Helena Pihl of Sweden (4081 points), Heidi Benserud representing Norway (3999 pts) and Helle Sichlau of Denmark (3897 pts).

== Editions ==
Edition	Year	City	Country	Date	No. of athletes	No. of nations
1st	1974	Oslo	Norway	25 June		
2nd	1976	Joensuu	Finland	12–13 June		
3rd	1978	Lyngby	Denmark	22 July		
4th	1980	Varberg	Sweden	12 July		
5th	1982	Reykjavík	Iceland	1718 July		
