= Juha Plosila =

Finnish long jumper (born 1965)

Personal information
- Born: 21 June 1965 (age 61)

Sport
- Sport: Track and field

Juha Petteri Plosila (born 21 June 1965) is a retired male long jumper from Finland.

== International competitions ==
Year	Competition	Venue	Position	Notes
Representing Finland
1988	European Indoor Championships	Budapest, Hungary	12th	7.56 m
1989	European Indoor Championships	The Hague, Netherlands	11th	7.61 m

Year	Tournament	Venue	Result	Extra
1985	Kalevan kisat	Lahti	2nd	
1987	Kalevan kisat	Kuopio	3rd	
