= Nordic Junior Combined Events Championships =

- Sport: Combined track and field events
- Founded: 1969
- Country: Finland, Sweden, Norway, Denmark and Iceland

The Nordic Junior Combined Events Championships (Norwegian: Nordisk juniormesterskap i mangekamp) is an annual outdoor combined track and field events competition for athletes under-20 from the Nordic countries – Sweden, Norway, Finland, Denmark, and Iceland. Athletes must be 19 years of age or younger by December 31 of the year the championship is held. Men compete in the decathlon and women compete in the heptathlon. In the early history of the competition, the women's pentathlon was held instead of heptathlon.

The competition was first held in 1969 as part of the Nordic Combined Events Championships. When the senior event folded after 1970, the junior event was established in its own right in 1974.

== Editions ==
Ed.	Year	Dates	Place	Country
1	1969	28–29 June	Kongsvinger	Norway
2	1974	24–25 August	Fredrikstad	Norway
3	1975	30–31 August	Porvoo	Finland
4	1976	17–18 July	Lyngby	Denmark
5	1977	16–17 July	Uddevalla	Sweden
6	1978	8–9 July	Reykjavík	Iceland
7	1979	3–4 July	Copenhagen	Denmark
8	1980	19–20 August	Larvik	Norway
9	1981	27–28 June	Otaniemi	Finland
10	1982	17–18 July	Huddinge	Sweden
11	1983	16–17 July	Aalborg	Denmark
12	1984	28–29 July	Kristiansand	Norway
13	1985	29–30 June	Mora	Sweden
14	1986	28–29 June	Hyrylä	Finland
15	1987	27–28 June	Fredrikstad	Norway
16	1988	2–3 July	Norrtälje	Sweden
17	1989	1–2 July	Tårnby	Denmark
18	1990	7–8 July	Parkano	Finland
19	1991	29–30 June	Kristiansand	Norway
20	1992	1–2 August	Huddinge	Sweden
21	1993	3–4 July	Tårnby	Denmark
22	1994	2–3 August	Hyvinkää	Finland
23	1995	15–16 July	Hønefoss	Norway
24	1996	20–21 July	Växjö	Sweden
25	1997	2–3 August	Hvidovre	Denmark
26	1998	11–12 July	Hyvinkää	Finland
27	1999	3–4 July	Hafnarfjörður	Iceland
28	2000	15–16 July	Geithus	Norway
29	2001	4–5 August	Gävle	Sweden
30	2002	27–28 July	Aalborg	Denmark
31	2003	2–3 August	Reykjavík	Iceland
32	2004	19–20 June	Jyväskylä	Finland
33	2005	18–19 June	Nyköping	Sweden
34	2006	17–18 June	Moss	Norway
35	2007	23–24 June	Vejle	Denmark
36	2008	7–8 June	Jyväskylä	Finland
37	2009	13–14 June	Kópavogur	Iceland
38	2010	12–13 June	Randers	Denmark
39	2011	18–19 June	Sipoo	Finland
40	2012	16–17 June	Sandnes	Norway
41	2013	8–9 June	Huddinge	Sweden
42	2014	7–8 June	Kópavogur	Iceland
43	2015	13–14 June	Copenhagen	Denmark
44	2016	11–12 June	Växjö	Sweden
45	2017	10–11 June	Kuortane	Finland
46	2018	9–10 June	Jessheim	Norway
47	2019	15–16 June		Iceland
