= Estonian Fencing Federation =

Sports governing body in Estonia

Estonian Fencing Federation (abbreviation EFF; Estonian: Eesti Vehklemisliit) is one of the sport governing bodies in Estonia which deals with fencing.

EFF is established on 2 December 1989 in Tallinn. EFF is a successor of Estonian SSR Fencing Federation (Estonian: Eesti NSV Vehklemisföderatsioon) which was established in 1948. EFF is a member of International Fencing Federation (FIE).
