= Paavo Kotila =

Finnish long-distance runner

Paavo Edvard Kotila (26 August 1927 in Veteli – 26 January 2014) was a Finnish long-distance runner, Olympian, and three-time national champion in the marathon (1955, 1956, 1961).

== Biography ==
Kotila won his second consecutive national title in 1956 with a time of 2:18:04.8. (Note: The International Association of Athletics Federations has published a progression of road racing world bests and records that were widely recognized prior to ratification and official acceptance by the IAAF. According to that progression, Jim Peters' 2:17:40 performance at the Polytechnic Marathon on June 26, 1954 was a world best at the time. According to date provided by the Association of Road Racing Statisticians, they consider Peters' performance to have occurred on an "aided" course and recognize Kotila in the progression for world best in the marathon.) With this performance, he was ranked first in the marathon for 1956.

Kotila later finished 13th in the marathon on at the 1956 Summer Olympics and won the 1960 Boston Marathon.
