= Common Base Event =

Computing term

Common Base Event (CBE) is an IBM implementation of the Web Services Distributed Management (WSDM) Event Format standard. IBM also implemented the Common Event Infrastructure, a unified set of APIs and infrastructure for the creation, transmission, persistence and distribution of a wide range of business, system and network Common Base Event formatted events.
