= UEFA Women's Euro 2025 bids =

The bidding process for the UEFA Women's Euro 2025 ended on 4 April 2023 in Lisbon, Portugal, when Switzerland was announced to be the host.

== Hosting requirements ==
Media agencies revealed on 11 November 2020, that the European football governing body UEFA would decide on the host of UEFA Women's Euro 2025 in December 2022. The application for hosting was to have been submitted no later than August 2022. The bidding concept for UEFA Euro 2024 was ratified on 1 February 2019.

The tournament would continue the format of the 2017 and 2022 editions, with a total of 31 matches taking place for a duration of up to 25 days, with 16 teams competing in the tournament.

The requirements for the stadiums were as follows:

- 6-8 stadiums with 8,000-20,000 seats
- 1 stadium with at least 20,000 seats (potential final hosting)
- 4 quality training facilities per stadium
- 4 hotels per stadium

== Schedule ==
Date	Notes
1 June 2019	Bid committee announced
9 August 2019	Meeting with former and upcoming hosts
29 August 2019	UEFA Women's Euro 2025 Workshop
12 October 2022	Deadline for submission of bids
4 April 2023	Announcement of hosts by UEFA Executive Committee

== Bids ==
Eight European national associations signalled to UEFA their interest in staging UEFA Women's Euro 2025:

=== Confirmed bids ===
==== Poland ====
Poland stadia map

On 3 June 2021, Zbigniew Boniek, head of the Polish Football Association, announced that the association had filed their bid at UEFA to host the 2025 Women's Championship, citing women's football as gaining in popularity in many European countries, including Poland. Poland hosted previously the Men's Euro in 2012 with Ukraine and the 2019 FIFA U-20 World Cup.

The following 10 host cities and stadiums were selected for Poland's bid:

- Wrocław – Stadion Wrocław, capacity 45,105
- Gdańsk – Stadion Gdańsk, capacity 43,615
- Kraków – Stadion Miejski im. Henryka Reymana, capacity 33,326
- Warsaw – Stadion Wojska Polskiego, capacity 31,800
- Białystok – Stadion Miejski (Białystok), capacity 22,386
- Łódź – Stadion Miejski im. Władysława Króla, capacity 18,029
- Lublin – Arena Lublin, capacity 15,500
- Tychy – Stadion Miejski (Tychy), capacity 15,500
- Gdynia – Stadion Miejski (Gdynia), capacity 15,139
- Bielsko-Biała – Stadion Miejski (Bielsko-Biała), capacity 15,076

==== "Nordics 2025": Denmark, Finland, Norway, and Sweden ====
Denmark, Finland, Norway, and Sweden stadia map

On 15 October 2021, the Danish Football Association, announced that the Nordic countries (Denmark, Finland, Norway, and Sweden) with support from Iceland and Faroe Islands, have confirmed their bids to host the UEFA Euro 2025. President of the Danish Football Association (DBU), Jesper Møller, stated, "We at DBU and in the Nordic football associations have very ambitious visions for the development of women's football. For four years, we have worked closely with our Nordic colleagues to create a strong bid for the final round. We are convinced that a Nordic host for the UEFA Euro 2025 will be fantastic for women's football – fans, players, stakeholders and UEFA".

Head of Women's Football Development in the Finnish Football Association, Heidi Pihlaja, said in a press release: "The European Championship finals bid, together with the other Nordic countries, is a key part of our goal to strengthen football as a sport for women and girls". All four countries previously hosted the tournament in 1984, 1987, 1991, 1995, 1997, 2009 and 2013. If the bid had been successful, it would have been the second time in history that four countries co-hosted one major football tournament, after the men's 2007 AFC Asian Cup (hosted by Indonesia, Malaysia, Thailand and Vietnam).

Tensions between the Norwegian and Danish federation presidents were also deemed as a problem with their bid.

The following 9 host cities and stadiums were selected for the Nordic bid:

- (Denmark) Copenhagen – Parken Stadium, capacity 38,065
- (Denmark) Odense – Odense Stadium, capacity 15,633
- (Finland) Helsinki – Helsinki Olympic Stadium, capacity 30,084
- (Finland) Tampere – Tampere Stadion, capacity 16,800
- (Norway) Oslo – Ullevaal Stadion, capacity 28,000
- (Norway) Trondheim – Lerkendal Stadion, capacity 21,405
- (Sweden) Gothenborg – Gamla Ullevi, capacity 18,600
- (Sweden) Solna – Friends Arena, capacity 50,000
- (Sweden) Stockholm – 3Arena, capacity 30,000

==== France ====
France stadia map

France has never hosted the UEFA Women's Euro before, but the French Football Federation declared its interest in hosting it for the first time in the country's history. If France was selected, it would have marked six years after France hosted the FIFA Women's World Cup. Nevertheless, the country had previously hosted the 1960, 1984 and 2016 men's Euros. The bid stated that 59 of the 62 trips for the teams were possible by bus or train.

The following 8 host cities were selected for France's bid:

- Lyon - Parc Olympique Lyonnais, capacity 59,186
- Paris - Parc des Princes, capacity 48,583
- Lens - Stade Bollaert-Delelis, capacity 38,223
- Nantes - Stade de la Beaujoire, capacity 35,322
- Metz - Stade Saint-Symphorien, capacity 30,000
- Rennes - Roazhon Park, capacity 29,194
- Valenciennes - Stade du Hainaut, capacity 25,172
- Reims - Stade Auguste-Delaune, capacity 20,519

The reserved venues are as follows:

- Le Havre - Stade Océane, capacity 25,178
- Troyes - Stade de l'Aube, capacity 20,400

The scrapped venues are as follows:

- Nice - Allianz Riviera, capacity 35,624
- Grenoble - Stade des Alpes, capacity 20,068

==== Switzerland ====
Switzerland stadia map

Switzerland looked to host its first-ever UEFA Women's Euro in the country's history. The Swiss Football Association confirmed their interest in November 2021. They briefly thought about co-hosting the competition with another country but to no success and in the end decided to bid alone. Since awarded, it marks seventeen years after Switzerland co-hosted the Men's Euro with Austria.

On 23 March 2022, the Swiss Football Association announced an eleven city shortlist for the bid, with Neuchâtel (voluntarily withdrew) and the Stade Olympique de la Pontaise in Lausanne (not deemed an option) being taken out. Of the eleven cities, Liechtenstein's capital, Vaduz was included in the Swiss bid. Speaking about the inclusion of Vaduz, the head of LFV, Hugo Quaderer, stated: "Liechtenstein football fans have never had the opportunity to experience games for one of the most important cups in European football live, practically on their doorstep. We would therefore be very happy if Switzerland were awarded the contract with Vaduz as the venue."

However, by September 2022 plans for Liechtenstein's part of the bid were scrapped, along with Swiss town Schaffhausen. Lausanne withdrew as a venue prior to the vote to focus on hosting the 2025 Swiss Federal Gymnastics Festival.

The use of artificial turf in some Swiss stadiums was also brought up as a potential problem.

Prior to the bidding process, members of UEFA were telling Switzerland to withdraw because they thought their bid was too small.

The following 8 host cities and stadiums were selected for Switzerland's bid:

- Basel – St. Jakob-Park, capacity 38,512
- Bern – Stadion Wankdorf, capacity 31,783
- Geneva – Stade de Genève, capacity 30,084
- Zürich – Letzigrund, capacity 26,104
- St. Gallen – kybunpark, capacity 19,694
- Lucerne – Swissporarena, capacity 16,800
- Thun – Stockhorn Arena, capacity 10,398
- Sion – Stade Tourbillon, capacity 9,750

The scrapped venues from the shortlist were as follows:

- Lausanne – Stade de la Tuilière, capacity 12,544
- (Liechtenstein) Vaduz – Rheinpark Stadion, capacity 7,584
- Schaffhausen – Stadion Breite, capacity 7,300

The venues that were originally considered, but didn't make the shortlist were as follows:

- Lausanne – Stade Olympique de la Pontaise, capacity 15,786
- Neuchâtel – Stade de la Maladière, capacity 11,998

=== Cancelled bids ===
==== Denmark ====
Denmark stadia map

In February 2019, the Danish Football Association (DBU) stated its intention to bid, inspired by the recent success of the Denmark women's national football team. A joint bid with the other Nordic countries was also mentioned to be possible. Denmark hosted the UEFA Women's Euro 1991, with the host cities of Aalborg, Frederikshavn and Hjørring. As of July 2020, a bidding committee had already been setup to facilitate the Danish attempt to host the tournament. However, according to DBU president Jesper Møller, a modernization of several of the Danish stadiums would have been needed if the desire to apply had become a reality.

On 25 March 2021, the Danish regional television station TV 2/Fyn, announced that they had been given access to documents, through Odense Municipality, where it appeared that 12 Danish cities would have been potential host cities for the tournament in 2025. A timetable in the annexes stated that the interested host cities would have one year to decide whether they wanted their interest to be taken seriously.

The following 12 host cities and stadiums were selected for Denmark's potential bid:

- Copenhagen – Parken Stadium, capacity 38,065
- Brøndby – Brøndby Stadium, capacity 29,000
- Aarhus – Ceres Park, capacity 19,433
- Esbjerg – Blue Water Arena, capacity 18,000
- Odense – Nature Energy Park, capacity 15,790
- Aalborg – Aalborg Portland Park, capacity 13,800
- Herning – MCH Arena, capacity 11,423
- Horsens – CASA Arena Horsens, capacity 10,400
- Randers – Cepheus Park Randers, capacity 10,300
- Haderslev – Sydbank Park, capacity 10,000
- Silkeborg – JYSK Park, capacity 10,000
- Viborg – Energi Viborg Arena, capacity 9,566

On 15 October 2021, Møller announced at a press conference that his association abandoned its original plan to host the tournament independently and instead will focus on the plans for the Nordic candidacy.

==== Ukraine ====
The Ukrainian Association of Football had declared its interest in hosting the tournament in November 2021. It would have marked the first time Ukraine hosted the event, thirteen years after hosting the Men's Euro with Poland. However, following the 2022 Russian invasion of Ukraine, the bidding plan was put on hold due to the war and security concerns.
