= Krzysztof Kaniecki =

Polish long jumper

Krzysztof Kaniecki (born 23 June 1965) is a retired Polish long jumper.

He finished fourteenth at the 1988 European Indoor Championships. He became Polish indoor champion in the same year.
