= Austrian Fencing Federation =

Sports governing body in Austria

- Sport: Fencing
- Jurisdiction: Austria
- Abbreviation: ÖFV
- Affiliation: FIE
- Regional affiliation: EFC
- President: Ritwik Rastogi

Official website
- www.oefv.com
- (Austria)

The Austrian Fencing Federation (German: Österreichischer Fechtverband, ÖFV) is the national organisation for fencing in Austria and as such is a member of the international governing body for amateur fencing, the International Fencing Federation. It is based in Graz.

The Austrian Fencing Federation was founded in 1929, with Richard Brunner as its first president, although there had been earlier Austrian fencing bodies, beginning in 1887 with a German-Austrian Fencing Federation founded in Mannheim. It was dissolved in 1938 as a result of the annexation of Austria by Nazi Germany, and refounded on 26 April 1946. As of 2010, it had 52 constituent organisations with a total of 1,430 members. There are also two general secretaries.

Since 2008, the president of the federation has been Markus Mareich.

== Presidents ==
- 1945–1946: Friedrich Golling
- 1947–1949: Franz Chrudimak
- 1949–1952: Karl Hanisch
- 1952–1971: Hermann Resch
- 1971–1987: Peter Ulrich-Pur
- 1987–1989: Peter Berger
- 1989–1994: Rainer Mauritz
- 1994–2000: Klaus Vorreither
- 2000–2002: Roland Kayser
- 2002–2008: Josef Poscharnig
- 2008–2015: Markus Mareich
- since 2016: Ritwik Rastogi

== Notable Austrian fencers ==
- Albert Bogen (Albert Bógathy), saber, Olympic silver
- Siegfried Flesch (1872–1939), saber, Olympic bronze
- Dr. Otto Herschmann, saber, Olympic silver
- Heinz Lechner (born 1928)
- Ellen Preis (1912–2007), foil, Olympic champion, 3x world champion, 17x Austrian champion
