= Nordic Indoor Athletics Match =

Indoor track and field competition

- Sport: indoor track and field
- Founded: 2011
- Country: Finland, Sweden, Norway, Denmark and Iceland

The Nordic Indoor Athletics Match (Norwegian: Nordisk Mesterskap Friidrett Innendørs) is an annual indoor track and field competition between athletes from the Nordic countries, organised by Nordic Athletics. Established in 2011, it marked a return to regular indoor competition between Denmark, Finland, Iceland, Norway and Sweden, following on from the short-lived Nordic Indoor Athletics Championships in the late 1980s.

The first three editions were contested between Finland, Norway and Sweden only. Hosting duties are shared between the three nations on a yearly rotational basis. The one-day event is typically held on a Saturday in February. The match features a men's and a women's international team competition, referred to as Nordenkampen, where individuals score points based on their placing in the events. Denmark first entered the team competition in 2014 and since 2015 Danish and Icelandic athletes form a combined team against the more competitive Finnish, Swedish and Norwegian teams.

== Editions ==
Nordic Indoor Athletics Match editions
| Ed. | Year | Venue | City | Country | Date | Nations | Men's team winner | Women's team winner | Ref. |
|---|---|---|---|---|---|---|---|---|---|
| 1st | 2011 | Tampere Exhibition and Sports Centre | Tampere | Finland | 5 February | 3 | Sweden (115 pts) | Sweden (119 pts) | |
| 2nd | 2012 | Campus Steinkjer | Steinkjer | Norway | 11 February | 3 | Sweden (106 pts) | Sweden (123 pts) | |
| 3rd | 2013 | Telekonsult Arena | Växjö | Sweden | 9 February | 3 | Sweden (109 pts) | Sweden (104 pts) | |
| 4th | 2014 | Tampere Exhibition and Sports Centre | Tampere | Finland | 8 February | 5 | Sweden (112 pts) | Finland (102 pts) | |
| 5th | 2015 | Bærum idrettspark | Bærum | Norway | 14 February | 5 | Sweden (126.5 pts) | Sweden (146 pts) | |
| 6th | 2016 | Telekonsult Arena | Växjö | Sweden | 13 February | 5 | Sweden (146 pts) | Sweden (155 pts) | |
| 7th | 2017 | Tampere Exhibition and Sports Centre | Tampere | Finland | 11 February | 5 | Finland (140 pts) | Sweden (138 pts) | |
| 8th | 2018 | IFU Arena | Uppsala | Sweden | 11 February | 5 | Sweden (143.5 pts) | Sweden (146.5 pts) | |
| 9th | 2019 | Bærum idrettspark | Bærum | Norway | 10 February | 5 | Sweden (139 pts) | Sweden (131.5 pts) | |
| 10th | 2020 | Liikuntamylly | Helsinki | Finland | 9 February | 5 | Sweden (141 pts) | Sweden (139 pts) | |
| 11th | 2022 | IFU Arena | Uppsala | Sweden | 13 February | 5 | Sweden (154 pts) | Sweden (148 pts) | |
| 12th | 2023 | Eva Lisa Holtz Arena | Karlstad | Sweden | 12 February | 5 | Norway (130.5 pts) | Sweden (163 pts) | |
| 13th | 2024 | Bærum idrettspark | Bærum | Norway | 11 February | 5 | | | |
| 14th | 2025 | Kameleonten Sports Hall | Espoo | Finland | 9 February 2025 | 5 | | | |
