= Nordic Marathon Championships =

Marathon running competition

- Sport: Road running
- Founded: 1949
- Ceased: 1979
- Country: Nordic countries
- Related competitions: Nordic Athletics Championships

The Nordic Marathon Championships was an irregularly-held men's competition over the marathon distance between athletes from the Nordic countries. All five Nordic countries took part in the competitions and all five played host to the tournament, with Iceland being the last nation to do so in 1969. Finland was the most successful nation at the championships, with only two of the race winners coming from elsewhere. The only other countries to reach the medal table were Sweden and Norway.

It was inaugurated in 1949 and was held on a biennial basis until 1959. It was incorporated into the Nordic Athletics Championships for the 1961, 1963 and 1965 editions. The event re-emerged as a separate annual competition alongside the Nordic Combined Events Championships between 1967 and 1970. The last three marathons were held in 1975, 1977 and 1979. Women never featured at the competition as developments in women's athletics had not yet reached the point where marathon races were common.

Veikko Karvonen was the most successful athlete, with three straight victories from 1951 to 1955. Three other Finns managed to top the podium twice: Tenho Salakka, Eino Oksanen and Pentti Rummakko. Rummakko would have matched Karvonen's feat had he been officially selected in 1970 – he finished first in 2:29:34 hours competing as a guest that year. No athletes outside of Finland had an athlete reach the podium on multiple occasions. Finland swept the medals in 1955, 1957, 1959, 1963, 1968, and 1969. Reflecting the success of the Flying Finns period, at least two Finnish athletes stood on the podium at fourteen of the sixteen times the championships was held (Swedes took the minor medals in 1961 and Finland took no medals in 1977). Håkan Spik of Finland set the championships record of 2:14:48 upon winning the final edition in 1979.

A Nordic Marathon Match was held in 2015 in Stockholm. Men and women's individual and team competitions were held. Swedes Fredrik Johansson and Isabellah Andersson won the races and led their nation to both team titles.

== Editions ==
Edition	Year	City	Country	Date	No. of athletes	No. of nations
1st	1949	Stockholm	Sweden			
2nd	1951	Tampere	Finland			
3rd	1953	Oslo	Norway			
4th	1955	Copenhagen	Denmark			
5th	1957	Gothenburg	Sweden			
6th	1959	Pori	Finland			
7th	1961	Oslo	Norway			
8th	1963	Gothenburg	Sweden			
9th	1965	Helsinki	Finland			
10th	1967	Copenhagen	Denmark			
11th	1968	Reykjavík	Iceland			
12th	1969	Kongsvinger	Norway			
13th	1970	Sollentuna	Sweden			
14th	1975	Moss	Norway			
15th	1977	Aarhus	Denmark			
16th	1979	Östhammar	Norway			

== Medal summary ==
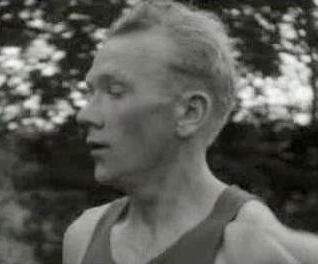
Veikko Karvonen of Finland has three consecutive wins from 1951 to 1955

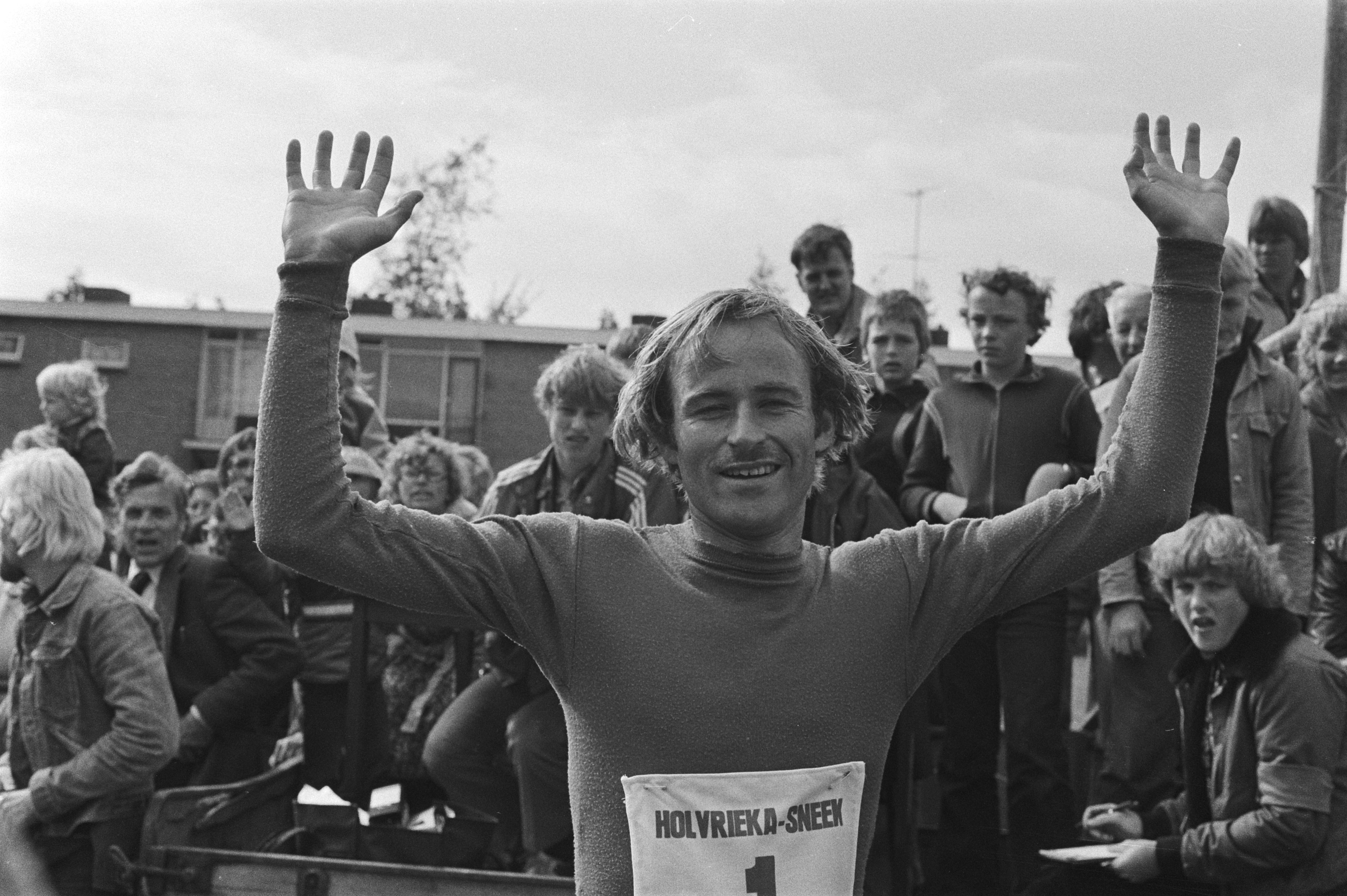
Jan Fjærestad of Norway was one of two non-Finns to win the event

Year	Gold		Silver		Bronze	
1949	Matti Urpalainen (FIN)	2:32:18	Gösta Leandersson (SWE)	2:33:55	Paavo Laine (FIN)	2:35:01
1951	Veikko Karvonen (FIN)	2:28:08	Gustaf Jansson (SWE)	2:29:19	Vilho Partanen (FIN)	2:34:37
1953	Veikko Karvonen (FIN)	2:30:16	Viktor Olsen (NOR)	2:33:17	Veikko Timonen (FIN)	2:35:11
1955	Veikko Karvonen (FIN)	2:21:22	Paavo Kotila (FIN)	2:24:19	Eino Pulkkinen (FIN)	2:26:30
1957	Paavo Kotila (FIN)	2:24:04	Eino Pulkkinen (FIN)	2:24:38	Eino Oksanen (FIN)	2:27:34
1959	Eino Oksanen (FIN)	2:25:35	Olavi Manninen (FIN)	2:25:44	Paavo Kotila (FIN)	2:26:13
1961	Tenho Salakka (FIN)	2:26:14	Evert Nyberg (SWE)	2:26:37	Arnold Vaide (SWE)	2:26:40
1963	Eino Oksanen (FIN)	2:22:01	Paavo Pystynen (FIN)	2:22:07	Eino Valle (FIN)	2:23:40
1965	Tenho Salakka (FIN)	2:24:51	Per Gunnar Lien (NOR)	2:24:51	Paavo Pystynen (FIN)	2:26:56
1967	Kalevi Ihaksi (FIN)	2:26:03	Erik Östbye (SWE)	2:27:34	Tenho Salakka (FIN)	2:27:58
1968	Pentti Rummakko (FIN)	2:17:48	Raimo Tikka (FIN)	2:18:50	Paavo Pystynen (FIN)	2:19:19
1969	Pentti Rummakko (FIN)	2:21:49	Kalle Hakkarainen (FIN)	2:23:27	Ensio Tanninen (FIN)	2:23:32
1970	Ulf Håkansson (SWE)	2:29:42	Kalle Hakkarainen (FIN)	2:29:53	Tenho Salakka (FIN)	2:30:18
1975	Reino Paukkonen (FIN)	2:21:52	Ove Malmqvist (SWE)	2:22:44	Ari-Pekka Gylling (FIN)	2:23:34
1977	Jan Fjærestad (NOR)	2:20:36	Lars Enqvist (SWE)	2:20:36	Henry Olsen (NOR)	2:21:04
1979	Håkan Spik (FIN)	2:14:48	Matti Karjalainen (FIN)	2:15:29	Kjell-Erik Ståhl (SWE)	2:16:49

== Medal table ==
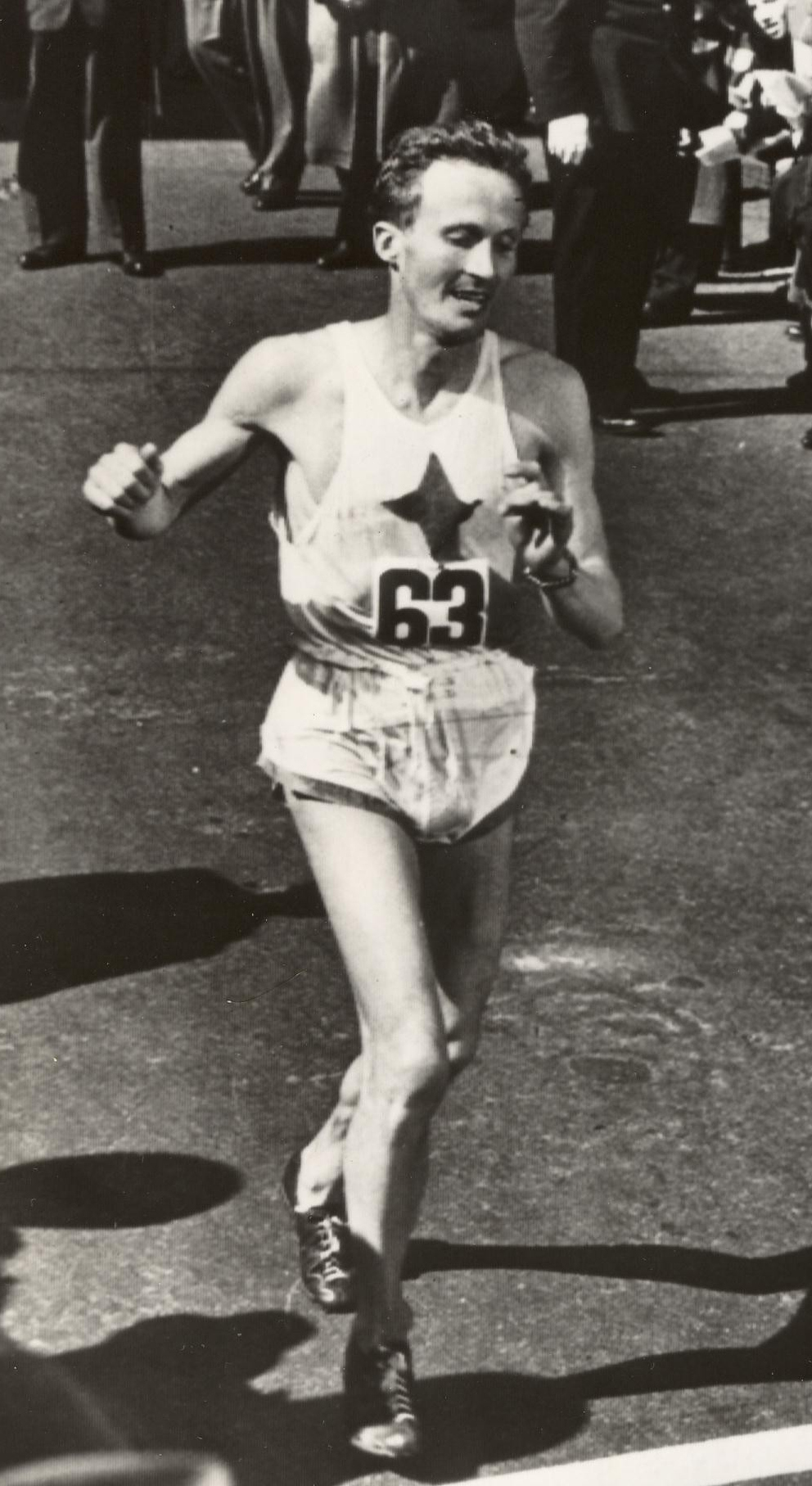
Gösta Leandersson was one of nine Swedish medallists in the event's history

Rank	Nation	Gold	Silver	Bronze	Total
1	Finland (FIN)	14	8	13	35
2	Sweden (SWE)	1	6	2	9
3	Norway (NOR)	1	2	1	4
Totals (3 entries)		16	16	16	48

== See also ==
- Nordic Cross Country Championships
