= Nordic 10000m Challenge =

Annual long-distance running competition

The Nordic 10000m Challenge is an annual long-distance running competition over 10,000 metres between the Nordic countries: Norway, Sweden, Denmark, Finland and Iceland. The competition was established in 1997, the same year as the European 10,000m Cup.

The organising body, Nordic Athletics, has also encouraged participation of the Baltic countries: Estonia, Latvia and Lithuania.

== Editions ==
Edition	Year	Venue	Country	Men's winner	Men's time	Women's winner	Women's time	Reference
22nd	2018	Copenhagen	Denmark	Roman Fosti (EST)	30:20	Sara Holmgren (SWE)	34:22	
21st	2017	Copenhagen	Denmark	Abdi Hakin Ulad (DEN)	29:23.28	Simone Glad (DEN)	34:00.21	
20th	2016	Lillerød	Denmark	David Nilsson (SWE)	29:32.92	Laura Markovaara (FIN)	34:00.14	
19th	2015	Aarhus	Denmark	Abdi Hakin Ulad (DEN)	28:58.89	Camilla Richardsson (FIN)	33:53.88	
18th	2014	Oslo	Norway	Marius Vedvik (NOR)	29:12.84	Frida Lundén (SWE)	34:11.21	
17th	2013	Sandviken	Sweden	Ørjan Grønnevig (NOR)	29:57.84	Simone Glad (DEN)	33:58.76	
16th	2012	Copenhagen	Denmark	Asbjørn Ellefsen (NOR)	29:47.03	Louise Wiker (SWE)	34:28.50	
15th	2011	Selfoss	Iceland	Jarkko Hamberg (FIN)	30:35.90	Elina Lindgren (FIN)	35:06.64	
14th	2010	Kerava	Finland	Sindre Buraas (NOR)	29:36.63	Christina Bus Holth (NOR)	34:51.03	
13th	2009	Oslo	Norway	Oskar Käck (SWE)	29:06.22	Karin Sennwall (SWE)	34.:34.82	
12th	2008	Roskilde	Denmark	Matti Räsänen (FIN)	29:43.63	Kirsten Melkevik Otterbu (NOR)	32:31.45	
11th	2007	Kerava	Finland	Jussi Utriainen (FIN)	29:54.16	Anneli Fransson (SWE)	34:50.91	
10th	2006	Kópavogur	Iceland	Rachid Benjira (SWE)	30:04.25	Annemari Sandell-Hyvärinen (FIN)	33:53.66	
9th	2005	Gothenburg	Sweden	Simo Wannas (FIN)	29:16.89	Annemette Jensen (DEN)	34:20.28	
8th	2004	Tønsberg	Norway	Steen Walter (DEN)	29:35.33	Annemette Jensen (DEN)	33:36.44	
7th	2003	Østerbro	Denmark	Claus Bugge Hansen (DEN)	29:16.63	Dorte Vibjerg (DEN)	32:43.19	
6th	2002	Espoo	Finland	Erik Sjöqvist (SWE)	28:55.24	Dorte Vibjerg (DEN)	33:30.81	
5th	2001	Norrtälje	Sweden	Joakim Johansson (SWE)	29:23.81	Bente Landøy (NOR)	33:58.89	
4th	2000	Sandefjord	Norway	Erik Sjöqvist (SWE)	29:13.16	Gunhild Haugen (NOR)	32:24.06	
3rd	1999	Aarhus	Denmark	Alfred Shemweta (SWE)	28:49.60	Hilde Hovdenak (NOR)	33:20.08	
2nd	1998	Karstula	Finland	Dennis Jensen (DEN)	29:02.87	Hilde Hovdenak (NOR)	33:11.36	
1st	1997	Stockholm (women) Gävle (men)	Sweden	Pasi Mattila (FIN)	28:57.95	Ann Bettner (SWE)	34:07.71	
