= Nordic Bouldering and Lead Climbing Championships =

Competition climbing event

Nordic Bouldering and Lead Climbing Championships are an annual set of two competition climbing events. Both competitions include junior and senior categories in the same event.

Participating countries until 2024 were Denmark, Finland, Iceland, Norway and Sweden. In 2025, the baltic countries were introduced to the competition.

== Rules ==
The Nordic Bouldering and Lead Climbing Championships follow IFSC Europe rules with only a qualification and final round.

== Nordic Bouldering medalists ==
=== Senior medalists ===
Year	Location	Men			Women			Details
Year	Location	Gold	Silver	Bronze	Gold	Silver	Bronze	Details
2015	(Finland) Turku	(Finland) Anthony Gullsten	(Finland) Ilari Kelloniemi	(Norway) Thilo Jeldrik Schröter	(Sweden) Kajsa Rosen	(Norway) Hannah Midtbo	(Finland) Anna Laitinen	
2016	(Denmark) Copenhagen	(Finland) Anthony Gullsten	(Norway) Thilo Jeldrik Schröter	(Denmark) Bjørn Arnel Iisager	(Norway) Hannah Midtbø	(Finland) Anna Laitinen	(Sweden) Kajsa Rosen	
2017	(Norway) Trondheim	(Norway) Thilo Jeldrik Schröter	(Finland) Anthony Gullsten	(Denmark) Bjørn Arnel Iisager	(Norway) Hannah Midtbø	(Norway) Tina Johnsen Hafsaas	(Norway) Sunniva Haave	
2018	(Sweden) Gothenburg	(Norway) Thilo Jeldrik Schröter	(Denmark) Bjørn Arnel Iisager	(Sweden) Samuel Wingårdh	(Sweden) Katrin Amann	(Norway) Sunniva Haave	(Sweden) Kajsa Rosen	
2019	(Finland) Espoo	(Finland) Anthony Gullsten	(Sweden) Ymer Alber	(Norway) Thilo Jeldrik Schröter	(Norway) Sunniva Haave	(Sweden) Linda Sjödin	(Finland) Roosa Huhtikorpi	
2020	(Denmark) Copenhagen	Canceled due to covid-19						
2021	(Denmark) Copenhagen	(Finland) Anthony Gullsten	(Sweden) Hannes Puman	(Sweden) Frederik Serlachius	(Norway) Sunniva Haave	(Norway) Ingrid Kindlihagen	(Norway) Hannah Midtboe	
2022	(Sweden) Lerum	(Finland) Anthony Gullsten	(Sweden) Hannes Puman	(Norway) Thilo Jeldrik Schröter	(Norway) Sunniva Haave	(Norway) Ingrid Kindlihagen	(Sweden) Katrin Amann	
2023	(Norway) Oslo	(Norway) Thilo Jeldrik Schröter	(Sweden) Hannes Puman	(Finland) Tuukka Simonen	(Norway) Sunniva Haave	(Norway) Ingrid Kindlihagen	(Denmark) Liv Gyllenborg	
2024	(Finland) Helsinki	(Sweden) Albin Meyer	(Norway) Teodor Kirkebø	(Norway) Thilo Jeldrik Schröter	(Norway) Sunniva Ø. Eide	(Norway) Ingrid Kindlihagen	(Finland) Laura Loikas	
2025	(Denmark) Copenhagen	(Norway) Per Ravlo-Caspersen	(Finland) Tuukka Simonen	(Denmark) Frederik Viberg	(Denmark) Liv Gyllenborg	(Sweden) Emilia Andersson	(Norway) Sunniva Ø. Eide	
2026	(Sweden) Lerum	(Norway) Leo Chiba	(Sweden) Albin Meyer	(Norway) Per R Caspersen	(Norway) Ingrid Kindlihagen	(Denmark) Clara Stricker-Petersen	(Sweden) Emilia Andersson	

=== Junior medalists ===
==== U21 (until 2025 U20) ====
Year	Location	Boys			Girls			Details
Year	Location	Gold	Silver	Bronze	Gold	Silver	Bronze	Details
2012	(Denmark) Copenhagen	(Finland) Elias Silvola	(Norway) Tarjei Hamre	(Finland) Henri Haime	(Denmark) Katrine Vandet-Salling	(Sweden) Stella Plantin	(Sweden) Johanne Sörbom	
2013	(Norway) Lillehammer	(Finland) Sami Koponen	(Norway) Endre Sandø Evensen	(Denmark) Thomas Holm Blaabjerg	(Norway) Tina Johnsen Hafsaas	(Denmark) Katrine Vandet-Salling	(Sweden) Sara Engqvist	
2014	(Sweden) Stockholm	(Norway) Endre Sandø Evensen	(Finland) Sami Koponen	(Norway) Jakob Heber Norum	(Sweden) Katrin Amann	(Sweden) Sara Engqvist	(Denmark) Laura Schmidt Hansen	
2015	(Denmark) Copenhagen	(Norway) Thilo Jeldrik Schröter	(Sweden) Hannes Puman	(Denmark) Frederik Thulstrup	(Norway) Sunniva Haave	(Denmark) Natacha Niviarsiaq	(Sweden) Norea Marceau	
2016	(Finland) Helsinki	(Finland) Jiri Kuusonen	(Sweden) Fredrik Serlachius	(Norway) Kristoffer Klev	(Norway) Sunniva Haave	(Denmark) Annika Korsgaard	(Denmark) Primula Aalund	
2017	(Sweden) Gothenburg	(Norway) Leo Ketil Bøe	(Norway) Kristoffer Klev	(Sweden) Fabian Förander	(Norway) Lisa-Marie Kvandahl	(Sweden) Silvia Barrett	(Denmark) Primula Aalund	
2018	(Finland) Helsinki	(Sweden) Samuel Wingårdh	(Norway) Hauk Steinsson Lem	(Denmark) Max Chaikengdee	(Norway) Lisa-Marie Kvandahl	(Sweden) Freja Duncan	(Denmark) Nea Herforth Bæhr	
2019	(Finland) Espoo	(Sweden) Ymer Alber	(Sweden) Samuel Wingårdh	(Denmark) Anton Y. Nielsen	(Norway) Regine Stora	(Norway) Pernille Seter	(Denmark) Isabella Nyhuus	
2020	(Denmark) Copenhagen	Canceled due to covid-19						
2021	(Denmark) Copenhagen	(Finland) Tuukka Simonen	(Finland) Ilmari Piiroinen	(Norway) Truls J. Mikaelsen	(Norway) Ingrid Kindlihagen	(Denmark) Gaia Toft	(Finland) Laura Loikas	
2022	(Sweden) Lerum	(Finland) Ilmari Piiroinen	(Sweden) Elliot Eriksson	(Finland) Joonas Salmi	(Norway) Anne Ackre	(Norway) Pernille Tvedt	(Norway) Inga Aarhus	
2023	(Norway) Oslo	(Finland) Riku Sinivirta	(Norway) Per Ravlo-Caspersen	(Sweden) Albin Meyer	(Norway) Julie Jøsok Holstad	(Norway) Nora Staurset Hovde	(Norway) Marte Myrland	
2024	(Finland) Helsinki	(Norway) Per Ravlo-Caspersen	(Sweden) Gabriel Kern	(Denmark) Magnus S. H. Sierslev	(Sweden) Emilia Andersson	(Sweden) Elise Mannerstråle	(Finland) Rosa Arnold	
2025	MERGED WITH ADULT CATEGORY							
2026	MERGED WITH ADULT CATEGORY							

==== U19 (until 2025 U18) ====
Year	Location	Boys			Girls			Details
Year	Location	Gold	Silver	Bronze	Gold	Silver	Bronze	Details
2012	(Denmark) Copenhagen	(Denmark) Frederik Zeilberger Thulstrup	(Finland) Sami Koponen	(Norway) Jakob Heber Norum	(Finland) Katariina Haime	(Sweden) Anna Gårdsmo	(Sweden) Sara Engqvist	
2013	(Norway) Lillehammer	(Norway) Thilo Jeldrik Schröter	(Norway) Jakob Heber Norum	(Sweden) Hannes Puman	(Norway) Marthe Håkenstad-Bråten	(Sweden) Kajsa Rosen	(Finland) Katariina Haime	
2014	(Sweden) Stockholm	(Sweden) Hannes Puman	(Sweden) Fredrik Serlachius	(Sweden) Fabian Förander	(Sweden) Kajsa Rosen	(Denmark) Liv Gyldenborg	(Norway) Sunniva Haave	
2015	(Denmark) Copenhagen	(Norway) Leo Ketil Bøe	(Denmark) Oliver Islin Sahl-Madsen	(Iceland) Guðmundur Freyr Arnason	(Sweden) Silvia Barrett	(Denmark) Annika Korsgaard	(Denmark) Primula Aalund	
2016	(Finland) Helsinki	(Sweden) Ymer Alber	(Norway) Leo Ketil Bøe	(Sweden) Samuel Wingårdh	(Norway) Lisa-Marie Kvandahl	(Denmark) Nea Herforth Bæhr	(Norway) Oda Lauridsen	
2017	(Sweden) Gothenburg	(Norway) Hauk Steinsson Lem	(Sweden) Marcus Gillberg	(Denmark) Max Jørgensen	(Sweden) Nea Herforth Bæhr	(Norway) Mia Stöver Wollebaek	(Sweden) Freja Duncan	
2018	(Finland) Helsinki	(Finland) Veikka Volotinen	(Norway) Albert Suthurst	(Norway) Tobias Reidel	(Norway) Regine Storå	(Norway) Tuva Haave	(Denmark) Isabella Prehn Nyhus	
2019	(Finland) Espoo	(Finland) Tuukka Simonen	(Norway) Truls Mikaelsen	(Norway) Tobias Reidel	(Finland) Laura Loikas	(Sweden) Sofie Asterling	(Norway) Ingrid Kindlihagen	
2020	(Denmark) Copenhagen	Canceled due to covid-19						
2021	(Denmark) Copenhagen	(Norway) Per R. Caspersen	(Denmark) Magnus S. H. Sierslev	(Norway) Teodor Kirkebø	(Norway) Sunniva Ø. Eide	(Norway) Edel Lemvik	(Norway) Thea Novak	
2022	(Sweden) Lerum	(Norway) Per R. Caspersen	(Denmark) Magnus S. H. Sierslev	(Sweden) Gabriel Kern	(Sweden) Elise Mannerstråle	(Norway) Camilla Sørbotten Marcussen	(Sweden) Thea Novak	
2023	(Norway) Oslo	(Norway) Sverre Olov Stensland Blixt	(Sweden) Gabriel Kern	(Sweden) Simon Borgh	(Finland) Jessica Knifsund	(Denmark) Clara Stricker	(Sweden) Nathalie Vendsalu	
2024	(Finland) Helsinki	(Finland) Eemeli Nuutinen	(Sweden) Birger Thor	(Sweden) Leon Podkanski	(Denmark) Clara Stricker	(Denmark) Emmelie Conders	(Finland) Jessica Knifsund	
2025	(Denmark) Copenhagen	(Sweden) Linus Qvarnström	(Norway) Olai H. Ødegaard	(Iceland) Paulo M. Guðrunarson	(Finland) Jessica Knifsund	(Iceland) Agnes M. Folkmann	(Denmark) Ronja Vickery	
2026	(Sweden) Lerum	(Sweden) Linus Qvarnstrøm	(Sweden) Herman Tidere	(Sweden) Jonah Kero	(Finland) Tilda Kosonen	(Iceland) Jenný Þ. Halldórsdóttir	(Norway) Kaja Moe-Evensen	

==== U17 (until 2025 U16) ====
Year	Location	Boys			Girls			Details
Year	Location	Gold	Silver	Bronze	Gold	Silver	Bronze	Details
2012	(Denmark) Copenhagen	(Finland) Samuel Hammer	(Sweden) Fredrik Serlachius	(Sweden) Philip Samuelsson Fordik	(Norway) Martine Limstrand	(Denmark) Primula Aalund	(Sweden) Kajsa Rosen	
2013	(Norway) Lillehammer	(Denmark) Bertil Schmidt	(Norway) Kristoffer Klev	(Sweden) Jonas Feddersen	(Denmark) Primula Aalund	(Norway) Bergljot Jullumstrø Hansen	(Denmark) Annika Korsgaard	
2014	(Sweden) Stockholm	(Norway) Leo Ketil Bøe	(Sweden) Ymer Alber	(Sweden) Samuel Wingårdh	(Sweden) Freja Duncan	(Denmark) Nea Herforth Bæhr	(Norway) Lisa-Marie Kvandahl	
2015	(Denmark) Copenhagen	(Denmark) Noah Seir	(Sweden) Ymer Alber	(Sweden) Olof Morsing	(Sweden) Julia Nilsson	(Denmark) Nea Herforth Bæhr	(Denmark) Marie Aagaard	
2016	(Finland) Helsinki	(Norway) Albert Suthurst	(Sweden) Marcus Gillberg	(Norway) Kristian Eian	(Norway) Oda Lauridsen	(Norway) Lea Schmitthenne	(Finland) Laura Loikas	
2017	(Sweden) Gothenburg	(Finland) Veikka Volotinen	(Norway) Örjan Rödland Vaage	(Finland) Viljami Tuomisto	(Denmark) Gaia Rebecca Toft Lauritzen	(Finland) Laura Loikas	(Sweden) Clara Blom Dandoy	
2018	(Finland) Helsinki	(Finland) Joonas Salmi	(Finland) Ilmari Piiroinen	(Norway) Teodor Kirkeboe	(Norway) Emma Wollebaek	(Norway) Sunniva Övre-Eide	(Norway) Edel Lemvik	
2019	(Finland) Espoo	(Norway) Teodor Kirkeboe	(Finland) Tomas Kaartinen	(Denmark) Magnus Hjorth Sierslev	(Norway) Edel Lemvik	(Norway) Sunniva Övre-Eide	(Denmark) Anine Hjort Alstrup	
2020	(Denmark) Copenhagen	Canceled due to covid-19						
2021	(Denmark) Copenhagen	(Finland) Hugo Talvisalmi	(Sweden) Gabriel Kern	(Norway) Sverre O. S. Blixt	(Denmark) Clara Stricker	(Sweden) Nathalie Vendsalu	(Finland) Rosa Arnold	
2022	(Sweden) Lerum	(Norway) Gard Bang Kittilsen	(Finland) Aaron Rantanen	(Sweden) Filip Thuresson	(Denmark) Emmelie Conders	(Finland) Jessica Knifsund	(Denmark) Clara Stricker	
2023	(Norway) Oslo	(Sweden) Linus Qvarnström	(Finland) Eemeli Nuutinen	(Denmark) Jens Carlo Theilmann	(Finland) Tilda Kosonen	(Sweden) Hedda Norel	(Sweden) Alice Ma Johansson	
2024	(Finland) Helsinki	(Finland) Peetu Rintamäki	(Finland) Vilho Talvisalmi	(Finland) Matti Aziz	(Finland) Lumi Pellikka	(Norway) Elunn Lova Grammeltvedt	(Iceland) Jenný Þóra Halldórsdóttir	
2025	(Denmark) Copenhagen	(Finland) Matti Aziz	(Denmark) Aske Mikkelsen	(Denmark) Noah Nielsen	(Norway) Elunn L. Grammeltvedt	(Latvia) Rebeka Kobitjeva	(Finland) Tilda Kosonen	
2026	(Sweden) Lerum	(Denmark) Noah Nielsen	(Finland) Leo Leiho	(Norway) Gabriel J S Renshaw	(Denmark) Alva Ishøy	(Norway) Virginia Vigdal	(Denmark) Sia Normand-Treier	

== Nordic Lead Climbing medalists ==
=== Senior medalists ===
Year	Location	Men			Women			Details
Year	Location	Gold	Silver	Bronze	Gold	Silver	Bronze	Details
2015	(Sweden) Gothenburg	(Sweden) Erik Grandelius	(Sweden) Magnus Högström	(Norway) Endre Evensen	(Sweden) Kajsa Rosen	(Norway) Tina Johnsen Hafsaas	(Denmark) Michelle Kim Theisen	
2016	(Norway) Haugesund	(Sweden) Hannes Puman	(Norway) Magnus Midtbø	(Sweden) Fredrik Serlachius	(Norway) Hannah Midtbø	(Finland) Anna Laitinen	(Sweden) Nanna Söderin	
2017	(Finland) Helsinki	(Sweden) Hannes Puman	(Sweden) Fredrik Serlachius	(Finland) Kuutti Huhtikorpi	(Norway) Tina Johnsen Hafsaas	(Norway) Hannah Midtbø	(Norway) Lisa-Marie Kvandahl	
2018	(Denmark) Århus	(Denmark) Thomas Blaabjerg	(Sweden) Fredrik Serlachius	(Sweden) Kristoffer Lindbeck	(Sweden) Kajsa Rosen	(Norway) Lisa-Marie Kvandahl	(Sweden) Freja Duncan	
2019	(Sweden) Malmö	(Norway) Thilo Jeldrik Schröter	(Sweden) Ymer Alber	(Denmark) Thomas Holm Blaabjerg	(Denmark) Primula Aalund	(Sweden) Kajsa Rosen	(Norway) Tina Johnsen Hafsaas	
2020	Norway	Canceled due to covid-19						
2021	(Norway) Lillehammer	(Finland) Anthony Gullsten	(Norway) Leo Ketil Bøe	(Finland) Axel Lindfors	(Norway) Ingrid Kindlihagen	(Denmark) Katrine Vander Salling	(Norway) Anne Ackre	
2022	(Finland) Helsinki	(Finland) Anthony Gullsten	(Sweden) Kristoffer Lindbeck	(Finland) Ilmari Piiroinen	(Norway) Sunniva Øvre-Eide	(Norway) Ingrid Kindlihagen	(Norway) Anne Ackre	
2023	(Denmark) Copenhagen	(Sweden) Fredrik Serlachius	(Sweden) Kristoffer Lindbeck	(Denmark) Anton Y. H. Nielsen	(Norway) Ingrid Kindlihagen	(Denmark) Primula Aalund	(Sweden) Jenny Leandersson	
2024	(Sweden) Gothenburg	(Sweden) Elliot Eriksson	(Denmark) Thomas Holm Blaabjerg	(Sweden) Albin Meyer	(Norway) Sunniva Øvre-Eide	(Denmark) Laura N. Hansen	(Denmark) Primula Aalund	
2025	(Norway) Bergen	(Norway) Per R. Caspersen	(Sweden) Albin Meyer	(Denmark) Theis Elfenbein	(Norway) Sunniva Øvre-Eide	(Norway) Anne Ackre	(Denmark) Laura N. Hansen	
2026	(Finland) Helsinki	(Sweden) Gabriel Kern	(Finland) Anthony Gullsten	(Iceland) Greipur Ásmundarson	(Norway) Emmelie Condors	(Norway) Sunniva Øvre-Eide	(Norway) Pernille Tvedt	

=== Junior medalists ===
==== U21 (until 2025 U20) ====
Year	Location	Men			Women			Details
Year	Location	Gold	Silver	Bronze	Gold	Silver	Bronze	Details
2015								
2016	(Norway) Haugesund	(Sweden) Hannes Puman	(Sweden) Fredrik Serlachius	(Norway) Håvard Helgesen		(Finland)	(Finland)	
2017	(Finland) Helsinki				(Norway) Lisa-Marie Kvandahl	(Finland)	(Finland)	
2018	(Denmark) Århus	(Sweden) Ymer Alber	(Sweden) Rasmus Cronlund	(Norway) Hauk Lem	(Norway) Lisa-Marie Kvandahl	(Sweden) Freja Duncan	(Norway) Signe Ingvarda Øye	
2019	(Sweden) Malmö	(Sweden) Ymer Alber	(Sweden) Olof Morsing	(Finland) Aleksi Mikkola	(Denmark) Nikoline Öhrström	(Sweden) Alexandra Gullberg	(Norway) Regine Storå	
2020	Norway	Canceled due to covid-19						
2021	(Norway) Lillehammer	(Finland) Ilmari Piiroinen	(Norway) Örjan Vaage	(Norway) Lars Matre	(Norway) Ingrid Kindlihagen	(Norway) Anne Ackre	(Norway) Amanda Buer	
2022	(Finland) Helsinki	(Norway) Per R. Caspersen	(Norway) Trym S. Landmark	(Norway) Sverre Blixt	(Denmark) Jasmin Rønnow	(Norway) Camilla Sørbotten Marcussen	(Finland) Rosa Arnold	
2023	(Denmark) Copenhagen	(Norway) Trym S. Landmark	(Norway) Per R. Caspersen	(Sweden) Albin Meyer	(Norway) Sunniva Øvre-Eide	(Denmark) Laura N. Hansen	(Norway) Marte Myrland	
2024	(Sweden) Gothenburg	(Sweden) Gabriel Kern	(Norway) Per R. Caspersen	(Sweden) Mikkel K. Kaufeldt	(Finland) Iris Heikkinen	(Finland) Rosa Arnold	(Norway) Hanne S. S. Biørn-Ian	
2025	MERGED WITH ADULT CATEGORY							
2026	MERGED WITH ADULT CATEGORY							

==== U19 (until 2025 U18) ====
Year	Location	Boys			Girls			Details
Year	Location	Gold	Silver	Bronze	Gold	Silver	Bronze	Details
2014	(Denmark) Copenhagen	(Sweden) Hannes Puman	(Norway) Jon Pål Hamre	(Sweden) Fredrik Serlachius	(Sweden) Rosén Kajsa	(Norway) Martine Limstrand	(Finland) Helmi Puustinen	
2015	(Sweden) Gothenburg	(Sweden) Fredrik Serlachius	(Norway) Leo Ketil Bøe	(Norway) Håvard Helgesen	(Norway) Lisa-Marie Kvandahl	(Denmark) Primula Aalund	(Norway) Camilla Persen	
2016	(Norway) Haugesund	(Norway) Leo Ketil Bøe	(Sweden) Ymer Alber	(Sweden) Samuel Wingårdh	(Norway) Lisa-Marie Kvandahl	(Denmark) Nea Herforth Bæhr	(Sweden) Silvia Barrett	
2017	(Finland) Helsinki	(Sweden) Ymer Alber	(Norway) Albert Suthurst	(Sweden) Olof Morsing	(Sweden) Nea Herforth Bæhr	(Norway) Mia Støver Wollebæk	(Norway) Marie Lauridsen	
2018	(Denmark) Århus	(Sweden) Olof Morsing	(Norway) Leo Chiba	(Norway) Albert Suthurst	(Norway) Mia Stöver Wollebæk	(Norway) Ingrid Kindlihagen	(Denmark) Gaia Toft	
2019	(Sweden) Malmö	(Finland) Ilmari Piiroinen	(Norway) Arne Farestveit	(Sweden) Ludvig Hult	(Sweden) Sofie Asterling	(Norway) Ingrid Kindlihagen	(Norway) Mia Stöver Wollebæk	
2020	Norway	Canceled due to covid-19						
2021	(Norway) Lillehammer	(Norway) Per R. Caspersen	(Norway) Teodor Kirkeboe	(Denmark) Magnus Hjorth Sierslev	(Norway) Sunniva Øvre-Eide	(Norway) Edel Lemvik	(Norway) Marte Myrland	
2022	(Finland) Helsinki	(Norway) Per R. Caspersen	(Norway) Trym S. Landmark	(Norway) Sverre Blixt	(Denmark) Jasmin Rønnow	(Norway) Camilla Sørbotten Marcussen	(Finland) Rosa Arnold	
2023	(Denmark) Copenhagen	(Sweden) Gabriel Kern	(Finland) Toivo Eloranta	(Denmark) Kasper Sporring	(Norway) Emmelie Conders	(Denmark) Clara Stricker-Petersen	(Finland) Jessica Knifsund	
2024	(Sweden) Gothenburg	(Sweden) Linus Qvarnström	(Iceland) Greipur Ásmundarson	(Norway) Olai H. Ødegaard	(Norway) Emmelie Conders	(Denmark) Clara Stricker-Petersen	(Sweden) Astrid Muth	
2025	(Norway) Bergen	(Iceland) Greipur Ásmundarson	(Norway) Ola Vekve	(Norway) Olai H. Ødegaard	(Denmark) Lucille Smith	(Norway) Emmelie Conders	(Finland) Jessica Knifsund	
2026	(Finland) Helsinki	(Norway) Ola Vekve	(Norway) Otto Hustad	(Norway) Haakon Kiperberg	(Finland) Lumi Pellikka	(Finland) Rosa Wall	(Iceland) Jenny Halldorsdottir	

==== U17 (until 2025 U16) ====
Year	Location	Boys			Girls			Details
Year	Location	Gold	Silver	Bronze	Gold	Silver	Bronze	Details
2013	(Finland) Helsinki	(Sweden) Fredrik Serlachius	(Sweden) Fabian Förander	(Sweden) Jonas Feddersen	(Norway) Lisa-Marie Kvandahl	(Sweden) Elin Sahle	(Finland) Helmi Puustinen	
2014	(Denmark) Copenhagen	(Sweden) Ymer Alber	(Norway) Leo Ketil Bøe	(Sweden) Samuel Wingårdh	(Norway) Lisa-Marie Kvandahl	(Denmark) Nea Herforth Bæhr	(Norway) Bergljot Hansen	
2015	(Sweden) Gothenburg	(Sweden) Ymer Alber	(Sweden) Olof Morsing	(Sweden) Marcus Gillberg	(Denmark) Nea Herforth Bæhr	(Sweden) Freja Duncan	(Sweden) Alexandra Gullberg	
2016	(Norway) Haugesund	(Sweden) Olov Morsing	(Sweden) Marcus Gillberg	(Norway) Kristian Eian	(Norway) Mia Støver Wollebæk	(Norway) Oda Lauridsen	(Denmark) Gaia Toft Lauritzen	
2017	(Finland) Helsinki	(Norway) Örjan Vaage	(Finland) Mikael Suihkonen	(Sweden) Anton Yakubenko	(Finland) Heta Mattila	(Norway) Ingrid Kindlihagen	(Norway) Emma Wollebaek	
2018	(Denmark) Århus	(Finland) Joonas Salmi	(Sweden) Dennis Yakubenko	(Norway) Teodor Kirkeby	(Norway) Emma Wollebaek	(Norway) Sunniva Øvre-Eide	(Norway) Edel Lemvik	
2019	(Sweden) Malmö	(Norway) Teodor Kirkeby	(Norway) Kristoffer Danielsen	(Denmark) Magnus Silas Hjorth	(Norway) Sunniva Övre-Eide	(Norway) Edel Lemvik	(Sweden) Elise Mannerstråle	
2020	Norway	Canceled due to covid-19						
2021	(Norway) Lillehammer	(Norway) Alfred Kirkeboe	(Norway) Olai Holterman Odegard	(Sweden) Simon Borgh	(Sweden) Nathalie Vendsalu	(Sweden) Lujza Török	(Finland) Saara Autero	
2022	(Finland) Helsinki	(Norway) Ola Vekve	(Sweden) Filip Thuresson	(Denmark) Frede Rudolf	(Denmark) Rio Jacobi	(Denmark) Emmelie Conders	(Sweden) Hedda Norell	
2023	(Denmark) Copenhagen	(Norway) Ola Vekve	(Denmark) Jens C. Teilman	(Norway) Finn M. Flemming	(Sweden) Hedda Norell	(Norway) Elunn L. Grammeltvedt	(Finland) Tilda Kosonen	
2024	(Sweden) Gothenburg	(Norway) Trym R. M. Raum-Eide	(Sweden) Leontin Denanto	(Norway) Hauk T. Bratland	(Norway) Johanne Flemmen-Bø	(Finland) Tilda Kosonen	(Finland) Lumi Pellikka	
2025	(Norway) Bergen	(Finland) Juho Anttila	(Norway) Syver Nygaard	(Norway) Elias N. v. Eijndthoven	(Finland) Tilda Kosonen	(Norway) Johanne Flemmen-Bø	(Norway) Alma L. Melås	
2026	(Finland) Helsinki	(Finland) Magnus Muro	(Sweden) Max Ingman	(Sweden) Arifin Denanto	(Norway) Hanna Sørli	(Norway) Virginia Vigdal	(Norway) Eva Eads	
