= Liikuntamylly =

Building in Helsinki, Finland

Coordinates: 60°13′29.28″N 25°4′36.48″E

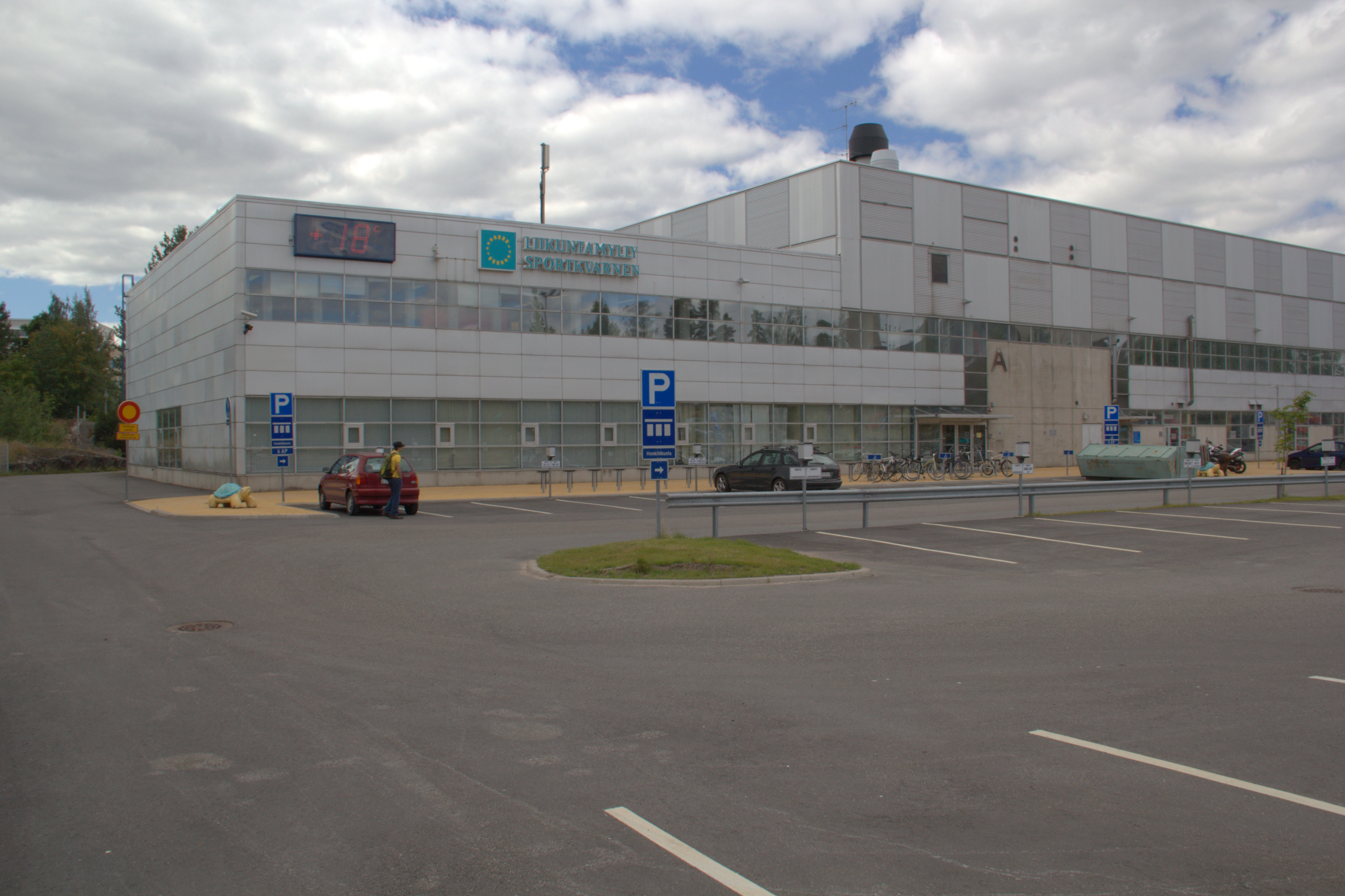
Liikuntamylly seen from Ring I.

Liikuntamylly is an all-activity hall over a hectare in size in the district of Myllypuro in East Helsinki, Finland. The building is located right next to the Myllypuro metro station. Most of the building consists of one large hall. The building also hosts business spaces on the bottom floor by the backyard side.

The building was originally built in 1979 as the printing house of the Paragon press (known as the Parate printing house), which worked at the premises until the 1990s. The building was designed from 1975 to 1979 by professor of architecture Aarno Ruusuvuori, who was known for using concrete as an architectural element. Special care was given to the comfort of the working premises. The building has later been protected in the zoning plan. After the building had been vacated during the early 1990s depression in Finland, the city of Helsinki bought the building and renovated it into an exercise hall from 1999 to 2000.

The volume of the building is 134,240 cubic metres and a has a total exercise area of 12,060 square metres.

The building is currently maintained by the physical exercise department of the city of Helsinki. The building has premises for athletics, artistic gymnastics, indoor climbing, various ball games and a health club. Liikuntamylly hosted the Finnish championships in indoor athletic sports in 2004 and 2011.

The Herttoniemi congregation has traditionally held a free food giveaway for the poor at the backyard of the building, which regularly causes one of the longest and most prominent food queues in Finland.
