= Nordic Indoor Athletics Championships =

Track and field competition

- Sport: Track and field
- Founded: 1986
- Ceased: 1987
- Country: Finland, Sweden, Norway, Denmark
- Related competitions: Nordic Indoor Athletics Match

The Nordic Indoor Athletics Championships was an international athletics competition between four Nordic countries – Finland, Sweden, Norway, and Denmark. It was held twice, in 1986 and 1987. The Nordic Indoor Athletics Match, first contested in 2011, replaced the championships.

== Events ==
The competition programme featured a total of 22 individual Nordic Championship athletics events, 12 for men and 10 for women. Women did not compete in the pole vault or triple jump events, reflecting the Olympic programme of the time.

Running

- 60 metres, 200 metres, 400 metres, 800 metres, 1500 metres, 3000 metres

Obstacle events

- 60 metres hurdles

Jumping events

- Pole vault (men only), high jump, long jump, triple jump (men only)

Throwing events

- Shot put

== Editions ==
Year	Date	Venue	Country	Winning men's nation	Winning women's nation	Results
1986		Lidingö	Sweden			
1987		Oslo	Norway			
