= List of international athletics competitions =

In the sport of athletics, international competitions between national teams can be distinguished into four main types:

- Multi-sport events, commonly referred to as games, where athletics events form part of a wider sporting programme
- World championships, the primary competitions where all nations may compete
- Continental or regional championships, between nations of a specific geographical area
- Competitions where the invited nations or athletes are from a shared community, typically based on language, religion, ethnicity, occupation, or political allegiance

Competitions between athletes of different nations which do not feature team selection at the national or continental level, such as the Diamond League, are excluded.

== Single-sport competitions ==
Event	First edition	Final edition	Periodicity	Age category	Competition type	Participating region/people
African Championships in Athletics	1979	Ongoing	Biennial	Senior	Continental championships	Athletes from African nations
African Combined Events Championships	1999	Ongoing	Irregular	Senior	Continental championships	Athletes from African nations
African Cross Country Championships	1985	Ongoing	Biennial	Senior	Continental championships	Athletes from African nations
African Half Marathon Championships	1995	1999	Biennial	Senior	Continental championships	Athletes from African nations
African Marathon Championships	1994	1996	Biennial	Senior	Continental championships	Athletes from African nations
African Masters Athletics Championships	?	Ongoing	Biennial	Over-40	Continental championships	Athletes from African nations
African Mountain Running Championships	2009	2014	Annual	Senior	Continental championships	Athletes from African nations
African Race Walking Championships	1999	2015(?)	Irregular	Senior	Continental championships	Athletes from African nations
African Southern Region Athletics Championships	1995	Ongoing	Biennial	Senior	Regional championships	Athletes from Southern Africa
African Southern Region Cross Country Championships	1997	Ongoing	Annual	Senior	Regional championships	Athletes from Southern Africa
African Southern Region Half Marathon Championships	2000	Ongoing	Annual	Senior	Regional championships	Athletes from Southern Africa
African U20 Championships in Athletics	1994	Ongoing	Biennial	Under-20	Continental championships	Athletes from African nations
African Youth Athletics Championships	2013	Ongoing	Biennial	Under-18	Continental championships	Athletes from African nations
African Zone VI Athletics Championships	1987	1995	Irregular	Senior	Regional championships	Athletes from Southern Africa
Arab Athletics Championships	1977	Ongoing	Biennial	Senior	Community championships	Athletes from Arab nations
Arab Cross Country Championships	1978	Ongoing	Biennial	Senior	Community championships	Athletes from Arab nations
Arab Junior Athletics Championships	1984	Ongoing	Biennial	Under-20	Community championships	Athletes from Arab nations
Arab Youth Athletics Championships	2004	Ongoing	Biennial	Under-18	Community championships	Athletes from Arab nations
Asia Masters Athletics Championships	1981	Ongoing	Biennial	Over-40	Continental championships	Athletes from Asian nations
Asian Athletics Championships	1973	Ongoing	Biennial	Senior	Continental championships	Athletes from Asian nations
Asian Cross Country Championships	1991	Ongoing	Biennial	Senior	Continental championships	Athletes from Asian nations
Asian Indoor Athletics Championships	2004	Ongoing	Biennial	Senior	Continental championships	Athletes from Asian nations
Asian Junior Athletics Championships	1986	Ongoing	Biennial	Under-20	Continental championships	Athletes from Asian nations
Asian Marathon Championships	1988	Ongoing	Biennial	Senior	Continental championships	Athletes from Asian nations
Asian Race Walking Championships	2006	Ongoing	Biennial	Senior	Continental championships	Athletes from Asian nations
Asian University Athletics Championships	2005	2005	One-off	Senior	Continental championships	Student-athletes from Asian nations
Asian Youth Athletics Championships	2015	Ongoing	Biennial	Under-18	Continental championships	Athletes from Asian nations
Athletics World Cup	2018	Ongoing	Undecided	Senior	Team competition	Leading athletics nations
Australasian Athletics Championships	1893	1927	Irregular	Senior	Regional championships	Athletes from Australia and New Zealand
Balkanation	2014	2015	Irregular	Senior	Team competition	Athletes from the Balkans
Balkan Athletics Championships	1929	Ongoing	Annual	Senior	Regional championships	Athletes from the Balkans
Balkan Athletics Indoor Championships	1994	Ongoing	Annual	Senior	Regional championships	Athletes from the Balkans
Balkan Athletics Indoor U20 Championships	2017	Ongoing	Annual	Under-20	Regional championships	Athletes from the Balkans
Balkan Athletics U18 Championships	2003	Ongoing	Annual	Under-18	Regional championships	Athletes from the Balkans
Balkan Athletics U20 Championships	1970	Ongoing	Annual	Under-20	Regional championships	Athletes from the Balkans
Balkan Cross Country Championships	1940	Ongoing	Annual	Senior	Regional championships	Athletes from the Balkans
Balkan Half Marathon Championships	2012	Ongoing	Annual	Senior	Regional championships	Athletes from the Balkans
Balkan Masters Athletics Championships	1991	Ongoing	Annual	Over-40	Regional championships	Athletes from Balkan nations
Balkan Masters Athletics Indoor Championships	2015	Ongoing	Annual	Over-40	Regional championships	Athletes from Balkan nations
Balkan Masters Cross Country Championships	2007	Ongoing	Annual	Over-40	Regional championships	Athletes from Balkan nations
Balkan Mountain Running Championships	2008	Ongoing	Annual	Senior	Regional championships	Athletes from Balkan nations
Balkan Race Walking Championships	2002	Ongoing	Annual	Senior	Regional championships	Athletes from Balkan nations
Balkan Relay Championships	2018	Ongoing	Annual	Senior	Regional championships	Athletes from Balkan nations
Baltic Indoor Athletics Championships	1995	2006	Annual	Senior	Regional championships	Athletes from the Baltic states
Baltic Match Throwing	2011	Ongoing	Annual	Senior	Regional team competition	Athletes from the Baltic states
British West Indies Championships	1957	1965	Annual	Senior	Community championships	Athletes from the British West Indies
CARIFTA Games	1972	Ongoing	Annual	Under-20	Community competition	Athletes from member nations of the Caribbean Free Trade Association
Central African Athletics Championships	1975	Ongoing	Irregular	Senior	Regional championships	Athletes from Central Africa
Central American Age Group Championships in Athletics	1994	Ongoing	Annual	Under-16	Regional championships	Athletes from Central America
Central American and Caribbean Age Group Championships in Athletics	1985	Ongoing	Biennial	Under-14	Regional championships	Athletes from Central America and the Caribbean
Central American and Caribbean Championships in Athletics	1967	Ongoing	Biennial	Senior	Regional championships	Athletes from Central America and the Caribbean
Central American and Caribbean Cross Country Championships	1983	2003	Annual	Senior	Regional championships	Athletes from Central America and the Caribbean
Central American and Caribbean Junior Championships in Athletics	1974	Ongoing	Biennial	Under-20	Regional championships	Athletes from Central America and the Caribbean
Central American Championships in Athletics	1958	Ongoing	Annual	Senior	Regional championships	Athletes from Central America
Central American Cross Country Championships	2004	Ongoing	Annual	Senior	Regional championships	Athletes from Central America
Central American Junior and Youth Championships in Athletics	1975	Ongoing	Annual	Under-20	Regional championships	Athletes from Central America
Central American Race Walking Championships	2007	Ongoing	Annual	Senior	Regional championships	Athletes from Central America
Championships of the Small States of Europe	2016	Ongoing	Biennial	Senior	Regional championships	Athletes from small European nations
China–Japan–Korea Friendship Athletic Meeting	2014	Ongoing	Annual	Senior	Regional team competition	Athletes from China, Japan and South Korea
Commonwealth Mountain and Ultradistance Running Championships	2009	2011	Biennial	Senior	Community championships	Athletes from the British Commonwealth
COSSASA Games	?	Ongoing	Annual	Schools	Regional competition	Student athletes from Southern Africa
DécaNation	2005	Ongoing	Annual	Senior	Team competition	Leading athletics nations and regions
Dutch Caribbean Age Group Championships	2002	Ongoing	Biennial	Under-15	Community championships	Athletes from the Dutch Caribbean
East African Athletics Championships	1995	?	Biennial	Senior	Regional championships	Athletes from East African nations
East African Cross Country Championships	1984(?)	Ongoing	Irregular	Senior	Regional championships	Athletes from East Africa
East African Half Marathon Championships	2000	?	Irregular	Senior	Regional championships	Athletes from East African nations
East and Central Africa Junior Athletics Championships	2013	Ongoing	Irregular	Under-20	Regional championships	Athletes from East African and Central African nations
East and Central African Championships	1955	1990	Annual	Senior	Regional championships	Athletes from East African and Central African nations
European 10,000m Cup	1997	Ongoing	Annual	Senior	Continental team competition	Athletes from European nations
European Athletics Championships	1934	Ongoing	Biennial	Senior	Continental championships	Athletes from European nations
European Athletics Indoor Championships	1966	Ongoing	Biennial	Senior	Continental championships	Athletes from European nations
European Athletics Indoor Cup	2003	2008	Biennial	Senior	Continental team competition	Athletes from European nations
European Athletics U18 Championships	2016	Ongoing	Biennial	Under-18	Continental championships	Athletes from European nations
European Athletics U20 Championships	1964	Ongoing	Biennial	Under-20	Continental championships	Athletes from European nations
European Athletics U23 Championships	1997	Ongoing	Biennial	Under-23	Continental championships	Athletes from European nations
European Champion Clubs Cup	1975	Ongoing	Annual	Senior	Continental team competition	Athletes from European clubs
European Champion Clubs Cup Cross Country	1962	Ongoing	Annual	Senior	Continental team competition	Athletes from European clubs
European Champion Clubs Cup for Juniors	1979	Ongoing	Annual	Under-20	Continental team competition	Athletes from European clubs
European Combined Events Team Championships	1973	Ongoing	Biennial	Senior	Continental team competition	Athletes from European nations
European Cross Country Championships	1994	Ongoing	Annual	Senior	Continental championships	Athletes from European nations
European Cup	1965	2008	Annual	Senior	Continental team competition	Athletes from European nations
European Half Marathon Cup	2016	Ongoing	Quadrennial	Senior	Continental team competition	Athletes from European nations
European Marathon Cup	1981	Ongoing	Quadrennial	Senior	Continental team competition	Athletes from European nations
European Masters Athletics Championship Non Stadia	1989	Ongoing	Biennial	Over-40	Regional championships	Athletes from European nations
European Masters Athletics Championships	1978	Ongoing	Annual	Over-40	Continental championships	Athletes from European nations
European Masters Indoor Championships	1997	Ongoing	Biennial	Over-40	Regional championships	Athletes from European nations
European Masters Mountain Running Championships	2006	Ongoing	Irregular	Over-40	Continental championships	Athletes from European nations
European Mountain Running Championships	1995	Ongoing	Annual	Senior	Continental championships	Athletes from European nations
European Race Walking Cup	1996	Ongoing	Biennial	Senior	Continental team competition	Athletes from European nations
European Team Championships	2009	Ongoing	Biennial	Senior	Continental team competition	Athletes from European nations
European Throwing Cup	2001	Ongoing	Annual	Senior	Continental team competition	Athletes from European nations
Fajr Indoor Athletics Championships	1992	Ongoing	Annual	Senior	Community championships	Muslim athletes
Finland-Sweden Athletics International	1925	Ongoing	Annual	Senior	Team competition	Athletes from Finland and Sweden
Gulf Cooperation Council Athletics Championships	1986	Ongoing	Biennial	Senior	Community championships	Athletes from member nations of the Gulf Cooperation Council
Gulf Cooperation Council Youth Athletics Championships	2000	Ongoing	Biennial	Under-18	Community championships	Athletes from member nations of the Gulf Cooperation Council
IAADS World Athletics Championships	2010	Ongoing	Biennial	Senior	Global championships	Athletes with Down syndrome from all nations
IAAF Continental Cup	1977	Ongoing	Quadrennial	Senior	Global team competition	Athletes from all nations in continental teams
World Athletics Championships	1983	Ongoing	Biennial	Senior	Global championships	Athletes of all nations
World Athletics Cross Country Championships	1973	Ongoing	Biennial	Senior	Global championships	Athletes of all nations
World Athletics Half Marathon Championships	1992	Ongoing	Biennial	Senior	Global championships	Athletes of all nations
World Athletics Indoor Championships	1985	Ongoing	Biennial	Senior	Global championships	Athletes of all nations
IAAF World Marathon Cup	1985	2011	Biennial	Senior	Global team competition	Athletes from all nations
World Athletics Relays	2014	Ongoing	Biennial	Senior	Global team competition	Athletes of all nations
IAAF World Road Relay Championships	1986	1998	Biennial	Senior	Global championships	Athletes of all nations
World Athletics U20 Championships	1986	Ongoing	Biennial	Under-20	Global championships	Athletes of all nations
IAAF World Women's Road Race Championships	1983	1991	Annual	Senior	Global championships	Athletes of all nations
IAAF World Youth Championships in Athletics	1999	2017	Biennial	Under-18	Global championships	Athletes of all nations
IAU 24 Hour World Championship	2001	Ongoing	Biennial	Senior	Global championships	Athletes of all nations
IAU 50 km World Championships	2005	Ongoing	Annual	Senior	Global championships	Athletes of all nations
IAU 100 km Asian Championships	2010	Ongoing	Biennial	Senior	Continental championships	Athletes from Asian nations
IAU 100 km European Championships	1992	Ongoing	Biennial	Senior	Continental championships	Athletes from European nations
IAU 100 km World Championships	1987	Ongoing	Annual	Senior	Global championships	Athletes of all nations
IAU European 24 Hour Championships	1992	Ongoing	Biennial	Senior	Continental championships	Athletes from European nations
IAU Trail World Championships	2007	Ongoing	Annual	Senior	Global championships	Athletes of all nations
Ibero-American Championships in Athletics	1960	Ongoing	Biennial	Senior	Community championships	Athletes from Spanish- and Portuguese-speaking nations
INAS European Athletics Indoor Championships	2000	Ongoing	Biennial	Senior	Continental championships	Athletes with intellectual disabilities from Europe
INAS European Athletics Outdoor Championships	1998	Ongoing	Biennial	Senior	Continental championships	Athletes with intellectual disabilities from Europe
INAS European Cross Country Championships	2001	Ongoing	Biennial	Senior	Continental championships	Athletes with intellectual disabilities from Europe
INAS European Half Marathon Championships	2005	Ongoing	Biennial	Senior	Continental championships	Athletes with intellectual disabilities from Europe
INAS World Athletics Indoor Championships	2001	Ongoing	Biennial	Senior	Global championships	Athletes with intellectual disabilities
INAS World Athletics Outdoor Championships	1989	Ongoing	Quadrennial	Senior	Global championships	Athletes with intellectual disabilities
INAS World Cross Country Championships	2002	Ongoing	Biennial	Senior	Global championships	Athletes with intellectual disabilities
INAS World Half Marathon Championships	2006	Ongoing	Biennial	Senior	Global championships	Athletes with intellectual disabilities
International Cross Country Championships	1903	1972	Annual	Senior	International championships	Athletes from Europe, North Africa, and North America
Leeward Islands Age Group Championships	1993	Ongoing	Annual	Under-15	Regional championships	Athletes from Leeward Islands nations
Leeward Islands Junior/Youth Championships	2001	Ongoing	Annual	Under-20	Regional championships	Athletes from Leeward Islands nations
Maghreb Athletics Championships	1967	1990	Irregular	Senior	Regional championships	Athletes from the Maghreb
Mediterranean Athletics Championships	1935	1949	Irregular	Senior	Regional championships	Athletes from Mediterranean nations
Mediterranean Athletics U23 Championships	2014	Ongoing	Biennial	Under-23	Regional championships	Athletes from Mediterranean nations
Mediterranean Athletics U23 Indoor Championships	2019	Ongoing	Biennial	Under-23	Regional championships	Athletes from Mediterranean nations
Melanesian Athletics Championships	2001	Ongoing	Biennial	Senior	Continental championships	Athletes from Melanesian nations
Micronesian Athletics Championships	2003	Ongoing	Biennial	Senior	Continental championships	Athletes from Micronesian nations
NACAC Championships in Athletics	2007	Ongoing	Irregular	Senior	Continental championships	Athletes from North and Central American and Caribbean nations
NACAC Cross Country Championships	2005	Ongoing	Annual	Senior	Continental championships	Athletes from North and Central American and Caribbean nations
NCCWMA Championships	1979	Ongoing	Biennial	Over-40	Continental championships	Athletes from North and Central America and the Caribbean
NACAC Mountain Running Championships	2004	Ongoing	Annual	Senior	Continental championships	Athletes from North and Central American and Caribbean nations
NACAC U18 Championships in Athletics	2019	Ongoing	Biennial	Under-18	Continental championships	Athletes from North and Central American and Caribbean nations
NACAC U23 Championships in Athletics	2000	Ongoing	Biennial	Under-23	Continental championships	Athletes from North and Central American and Caribbean nations
Nordic 10000m Challenge	1997	Ongoing	Annual	Senior	Community competition	Athletes from Nordic countries
Nordic Athletics Championships	1961	1965	Biennial	Senior	Community championships	Athletes from Nordic countries
Nordic Combined Events Championships	1949	1970	Biennial	Senior	Community championships	Athletes from Nordic countries
Nordic Indoor Athletics Championships	1986	1987	Annual	Senior	Community championships	Athletes from Nordic countries
Nordic Indoor Race Walking Championships	1974	1978	Biennial	Senior	Community championships	Athletes from Nordic countries
Nordic Junior Athletics Championships	2004	Ongoing	Annual	Under-20	Community championships	Athletes from Nordic countries
Nordic Junior Combined Events Championships	1974	Ongoing	Annual	Under-20	Community championships	Athletes from Nordic countries
Nordic Junior Race Walking Championships	1966	2003	Annual	Under-20	Community championships	Athletes from Nordic countries
Nordic Marathon Championships	1949	1979	Biennial	Senior	Community championships	Athletes from Nordic countries
Nordic Race Walking Championships	1957	Ongoing	Annual	Senior	Community championships	Athletes from Nordic countries
Nordic Women's Cup	1974	1982	Biennial	Senior	Community competition	Athletes from Nordic countries
Nordic–Baltic Under-23 Athletics Championships	1998	Ongoing	Biennial	Under-23	Community competition	Athletes from Nordic countries and Baltic states
North African Athletics Championships	2003	2004	Annual	Senior	Regional championships	Athletes from North African nations
North African Combined Events and Race Walking Championships	2004	2004	One-off	Senior	Regional championships	Athletes from North African nations
North African Cross Country Championships	1985(?)	Ongoing	Annual	Senior	Regional championships	Athletes from North Africa
North American 5K Championships	2002	2005	Annual	Senior	Regional championships	Athletes from North America
North American Men's Marathon Relay Championships	2003	2004	Annual	Senior	Continental championships	Athletes from North and Central American and Caribbean nations
Oceania Area Championships in Athletics	1990	Ongoing	Biennial	Senior	Continental championships	Athletes from Oceanian nations
Oceania Combined Events Championships	2011	Ongoing	Annual	Senior	Continental championships	Athletes from Oceanian nations
Oceania Cross Country Championships	2009	Ongoing	Biennial	Senior	Continental championships	Athletes from Oceanian nations
Oceania Junior Athletics Championships	1994	Ongoing	Biennial	Under-20	Continental championships	Athletes from Oceanian nations
Oceania Marathon and Half Marathon Championships	2008	Ongoing	Annual	Senior	Continental championships	Athletes from Oceanian nations
Oceania Masters Athletics Championships	1982	Ongoing	Biennial	Over-40	Continental championships	Athletes from Oceanian nations
Oceania Race Walking Championships	2011	Ongoing	Annual	Senior	Continental championships	Athletes from Oceanian nations
Oceania Youth Athletics Championships	1993	Ongoing	Biennial	Under-18	Continental championships	Athletes from Oceanian nations
Pacific Conference Games	1969	1985	Quadrennial	Senior	Regional competition	Athletes from Australia, Canada, Japan, New Zealand and the United States
Pan American Combined Events Cup	2005	Ongoing	Annual	Senior	Regional team competition	Athletes from the Americas
Pan American Cross Country Cup	2015	Ongoing	Biennial	Senior	Regional team competition	Athletes from the Americas
Pan American Race Walking Cup	1984	Ongoing	Biennial	Senior	Regional team competition	Athletes from the Americas
Pan American U20 Athletics Championships	1980	Ongoing	Biennial	Under-20	Regional championships	Athletes from the Americas
Pan American Youth Championships in Athletics	2015	Ongoing	Biennial	Under-18	Regional championships	Athletes from the Americas
Polynesian Athletics Championships	2000	Ongoing	Biennial	Senior	Continental championships	Athletes from Polynesian nations
Skyrunning World Championships	2010	Ongoing	Biennial	Senior	Global championships	Athletes of all nations
South America Masters Athletics Championships	1982	Ongoing	Biennial	Over-40	Continental championships	Athletes from South American nations
South American Championships in Athletics	1918	Ongoing	Biennial	Senior	Continental championships	Athletes from South American nations
South American Cross Country Championships	1986	Ongoing	Annual	Senior	Continental championships	Athletes from South American nations
South American Half Marathon Championships	1995	Ongoing	Annual	Senior	Continental championships	Athletes from South American nations
South American Marathon Championships	1994	Ongoing	Annual	Senior	Continental championships	Athletes from South American nations
South American Mountain Running Championships	2006	Ongoing	Annual	Senior	Continental championships	Athletes from South American nations
South American Race Walking Championships	1989	Ongoing	Biennial	Senior	Continental championships	Athletes from South American nations
South American Road Mile Championships	2000(?)	Ongoing	Annual	Senior	Continental championships	Athletes from South American nations
South American U18 Championships in Athletics	1973	Ongoing	Biennial	Under-18	Continental championships	Athletes from South American nations
South American U20 Championships in Athletics	1969	Ongoing	Biennial	Under-20	Continental championships	Athletes from South American nations
South American Under-23 Championships in Athletics	2004	Ongoing	Biennial	Under-23	Continental championships	Athletes from South American nations
South American University Athletics Championships	2005	2005	One-off	Senior	Regional championships	Student-athletes from South American nations
South Pacific Athletics Championships	1976	1984	Irregular	Senior	Regional championships	Athletes from South Pacific nations
South Asian Athletics Championships	1997	Ongoing	Irregular	Senior	Regional championships	Athletes from South Asia
South Asian Junior Athletics Championships	2007	Ongoing	Irregular	Under-20	Regional championships	Athletes from South Asia
Southeast Asian Youth Athletics Championships	2006	Ongoing	Annual	Under-18	Regional championships	Athletes from Southeast Asia
The Match Europe v USA	2019	Ongoing	Biennial	Senior	Team competition	Athletes from Europe and the United States
Towerrunning World Championships	2015	Ongoing	Biennial	Senior	Global championships	Athletes of all nations
USA–USSR Track and Field Dual Meet Series	1958	1985	Irregular	Senior	Team competition	Athletes from the United States and the Soviet Union
West African Athletics Championships	1997	Ongoing	Biennial	Senior	Regional championships	Athletes from West African nations
West African Cross Country Championships	1996	1996	One-off	Senior	Regional championships	Athletes from West African nations
West and North African Athletics Championships	1995	1995	One-off	Senior	Regional championships	Athletes from West and North African nations
West Asian Athletics Championships	2010	Ongoing	Irregular	Senior	Regional championships	Athletes from West Asia
Women's World Games	1922	1934	Quadrennial	Senior	Global competition	Female athletes from all nations
World Deaf Athletics Championships	2008	Ongoing	Quadrennial	Senior	Global championships	Deaf athletes of all nations
World Long Distance Mountain Running Championships	2004	Ongoing	Annual	Senior	Global championships	Athletes of all nations
World Masters 100 Kilometres Championships	1998	Ongoing	Biennial	Over-40	Global championships	Athletes from all nations
World Masters Athletics Championships	1975	Ongoing	Biennial	Over-35	Global championships	Athletes of all nations
World Masters Indoor Athletics Championships	2004	Ongoing	Biennial	Over-35	Global championships	Athletes of all nations
World Masters Non-Stadia Athletics Championships	1992	2004	Biennial	Over-35	Global championships	Athletes of all nations
World Military Track and Field Championships	1946	Ongoing	Irregular	Senior	Global championships	Military athletes of all nations
World Mountain Running Championships	1985	Ongoing	Annual	Senior	Global championships	Athletes of all nations
World Para Athletics Championships	1994	Ongoing	Biennial	Senior	Global championships	Athletes with a disability of all nations
World Para Athletics European Championships	2003	Ongoing	Biennial	Senior	Continental championships	Athletes with disabilities from European nations
World Para Athletics Junior Championships	2017	Ongoing	Biennial	Under-20	Global championships	Athletes with a disability of all nations

== Athletics at multi-sport events ==
Event	First edition	Final edition	Periodicity	Age category	Competition type	Participating region/people
Athletics at the African Games	1965	Ongoing	Quadrennial	Senior	Continental multi-sport event	Athletes from African nations
Athletics at the Afro-Asian Games	2003	2003	One-off	Senior	Community multi-sport event	Athletes of Africa and Asia
Athletics at the ALBA Games	2005	Ongoing	Biennial	Senior	Community multi-sport event	Athletes from members of the Bolivarian Alliance for the Americas
Spartakiad	1956	1991	Quadrennial	Senior	Mass competition	Athletes from the Soviet Union and foreign athletes

== See also ==
- List of multi-sport events
