= World Masters Non-Stadia Athletics Championships =

The World Masters Non-Stadia Athletics Championships was a biennial international athletics competition for masters athletes aged 35 and over, organised by World Masters Athletics. Formerly known as the World Veterans Non-Stadia Championships, it was first held in 1992 and had its final edition in 2004.

== Editions ==
Edition	Year	City	Country	Date
1	1992	Birmingham	United Kingdom	29–30 August
2	1994	Scarborough	Canada	30–31 July
3	1996	Bruges	Belgium	29–30 June
4	1998	Kobe	Japan	28–29 March
5	2000	Valladolid	Spain	13 May
6	2002	Riccione	Italy	24–26 May
7	2004	Manukau, Auckland, Rotorua	New Zealand	18 April - 1 May
