= African Southern Region Athletics Championships =

International track and field competition

- Genre: outdoor track and field
- Frequency: biennial
- Venue: varies
- Participants: Southern African nations
- Organiser: Confederation of African Athletics

The African Southern Region Athletics Championships is a biennial international outdoor track and field competition between Southern African nations, organised by the Confederation of African Athletics (CAA). Typically held over two days in June or July, it was established in 1995 and replaced the African Zone VI Championships. It is one of four regional championships organised by the CAA, alongside the North, East and West African Athletics Championships.

The competition is one of three senior athletics championships organised for the region, alongside the African Southern Region Cross Country Championships (held same year as the track and field meet) and the African Southern Region Half Marathon Championships (held annually). There is also an age category counterpart to the competition, in the form of the African Southern Region U18/U20 Athletics Championships, which is held in even-numbered years, and the Cossasa Games – an athletics competition for Southern African students organised by the Confederation of School Sport Associations of Southern Africa.

The competition is used as preparation by athletes who have been selected for the World Championships in Athletics, which takes place one to two months after the regional championships. Each edition of the championships attracts around a dozen countries and around 600 athletes in total.

The 2019 event was due to be hosted in Johannesburg, South Africa, but Athletics South Africa cancelled the event due to financial issues stemming from the legal case against the IAAF's testosterone rules.

== Editions ==
| Edition | Year | City | Country | Date | Nations | Athletes |
|---|---|---|---|---|---|---|
| 1 | 1995 | Harare | Zimbabwe | | | |
| 2 | 1997 | Durban | South Africa | | | |
| 3 | 1999 | Harare | Zimbabwe | | | |
| 4 | 2000 | Harare | Zimbabwe | | | |
| 5 | 2001 | Harare | Zimbabwe | 30 June – 1 July | | |
| 6 | 2003 | Lusaka | Zambia | 7–8 June | | |
| 7 | 2005 | Harare | Zimbabwe | 2–3 July | | |
| 8 | 2007 | Windhoek | Namibia | 26–27 May | | |
| 9 | 2009 | Gaborone | Botswana | 30–31 May | 11 | ~600 |
| 10 | 2011 | Maputo | Mozambique | 2–3 July | | |
| 11 | 2013 | Gaborone | Botswana | 1–2 June | | |
| 12 | 2015 | Reduit, Moka | Mauritius | 12–13 June | | |
| 13 | 2017 | Harare | Zimbabwe | 10–11 June | | |
| 14 | 2019 | Reduit, Moka | Mauritius | 5–6 July | | |

== Events ==
The competition programme features 32 regular athletics events: seven track running events, two obstacle events, three jumps, and four throws for both the sexes.

Track running

- 100 metres, 200 metres, 400 metres, 800 metres, 1500 metres, 5000 metres, 10,000 metres

Obstacle events

- 100 metres hurdles (women only), 110 metres hurdles (men only), 400 metres hurdles,

Jumping events

- High jump, long jump, triple jump

Throwing events

- Shot put, discus throw, javelin throw, hammer throw

3000 metres steeplechase, pole vault, and women's distance events are held irregularly due to a lack of entrants and organisational barriers.

== Participation ==
- Botswana
- Eswatini
- Lesotho
- Madagascar
- Malawi
- Mauritius
- Mozambique
- Namibia
- Réunion
- Seychelles
- South Africa
- Zambia
- Zimbabwe

== Men's champions ==
=== 100 metres ===
- 1995: Justice Dipeba (BOT)
- 1997: Matthew Quinn (RSA)
- 1999: Matthew Quinn (RSA)
- 2000: Anesu Mushonga (ZIM)
- 2001: Frank Chinyoka (ZIM)
- 2003: Jack Ngumbi (ZAM)
- 2005: Tlhalosang Molapisi (BOT)

=== 200 metres ===
- 1995: Justice Dipeba (BOT)
- 1997: Matthew Quinn (RSA)
- 1999: Philip Mukomana (ZIM)
- 2000: Ommanandsing Kowlessur (MRI)
- 2001: Mojalelefa Mosili (LES)
- 2003: Kapena Rukero (NAM)
- 2005: Hitjivirue Kaanjuka (NAM)

=== 400 metres ===
- 1995: Keteng Baloseng (BOT)
- 1997: Philip Mukomana (ZIM)
- 1999: Jeffrey Masvanhise (ZIM)
- 2000: Jeffrey Masvanhise (ZIM)
- 2001: Mojalelefa Mosili (LES)
- 2003: Jeffrey Wilson (ZIM)
- 2005: Gakologelwa Masheto (BOT)

=== 800 metres ===
- 1995: Melford Homela (ZIM)
- 1997: Crispen Mutakanyi (ZIM)
- 1999: Crispen Mutakanyi (ZIM)
- 2000: Crispen Mutakanyi (ZIM)
- 2001: Crispen Mutakanyi (ZIM)
- 2003: Crispen Mutakanyi (ZIM)
- 2005: Solomon Serameng (BOT)

=== 1500 metres ===
- 1995: Olerice Modisdaotsile (BOT)
- 1997: Ebeneza Felix (RSA)
- 1999: Savieri Ngidhi (ZIM)
- 2000: Unknown
- 2001: Moswasi Keneetse (BOT)
- 2003: Prosper Tandabala (ZAM)
- 2005: Gabaitumele Kananyo (BOT)

=== 5000 metres ===
- 1995: Josphat Mhande (ZIM)
- 1997: Reinhold Iita (NAM)
- 1999: George Majaji (ZIM)
- 2000: Kudakwashe Shoko (ZIM)
- 2001: Kudakwashe Shoko (ZIM)
- 2003: Wirimai Juwawo (ZIM)
- 2005: Cuthbert Nyasango (ZIM)

=== 10,000 metres ===
- 1995: Thethelani Moyo (ZIM)
- 1997: Andries Khulu (RSA)
- 1999: George Majaji (ZIM)
- 2000: Not held
- 2001: Wirimai Juwawo (ZIM)
- 2003: Venry Hamalila (ZAM)
- 2005: Richard Bwalya (ZAM)

=== 3000 metres steeplechase ===
- 1995: Emmanuel Matashu (ZIM)
- 1997: Shadrack Mogotsi (RSA)

=== 110 metres hurdles ===
- 1995: William Gamatis (SEY)
- 1997: Pieter van Eeden (RSA)
- 1999: Benjamin Songoya (ZIM)
- 2000: Iain Harnden (ZIM)
- 2001: Not held
- 2003: Sousa Machele (MOZ)
- 2005: Alberto Mondré (MRI)

=== 400 metres hurdles ===
- 1995: Julius Masvanise (ZIM)
- 1997: Llewellyn Herbert (RSA)
- 1999: Stéphane Banane (SEY)
- 2000: Iain Harnden (ZIM)
- 2001: Marthinus Kritzinger (RSA)
- 2003: Julius Masvanise (ZIM)
- 2005: Kurt Couto (MOZ)

=== High jump ===
- 1995: Eugène Ernesta (SEY)
- 1997: Gavin Lendis (RSA)
- 1999: Juma Phiri (ZIM)
- 2000: Perry Prosper (MRI)
- 2001: Kabelo Mmono (BOT)
- 2003: Kabelo Mmono (BOT)
- 2005: Kabelo Mmono (BOT)

=== Pole vault ===
- 1995: Stanley Flowers (ZIM)
- 1997: Not held
- 1999: Gilbert Musengi (ZIM)
- 2000: Tendai Mujaji (ZIM)

=== Long jump ===
- 1995: Paul Lespérance (SEY)
- 1997: Victor Shabangu (SWZ)
- 1999: Arnaud Casquette (MRI)
- 2000: Likwa Ncube (ZIM)
- 2001: Antoine Barbé (SEY)
- 2003: Godfrey Khotso Mokoena (RSA)
- 2005: Richard Chitambe (ZAM)

=== Triple jump ===
- 1995: Paul Lespérance (SEY)
- 1997: Paul Nioze (SEY)
- 1999: Gable Garenamotse (BOT)
- 2000: Charles Mashozhera (ZIM)
- 2001: Antoine Barbé (SEY)
- 2003: Godfrey Khotso Mokoena (RSA)
- 2005: Alfonso Zandamela (MOZ)

=== Shot put ===
- 1995: Innocent Chingwe (ZIM)
- 1997: Burger Lambrechts (RSA)
- 1999: Johannes van Wyk (RSA)
- 2000: Allan Nyoni (ZIM)
- 2001: Brian Ngoma (MAW)
- 2003: Mkhululi Malvet Lebala (BOT)
- 2005: Dumisani Fakudze (SWZ)

=== Discus throw ===
- 1995: Dario Bègue (MRI)
- 1997: Frits Potgieter (RSA)
- 1999: Johannes van Wyk (RSA)
- 2000: Allan Nyoni (ZIM)
- 2001: Eric Koo Wan Siong (MRI)
- 2003: Patrick Kansengwa (ZAM)
- 2005: Dumisani Fakudze (SWZ)

=== Hammer throw ===
- 1995: Vincent Lambourn (ZIM)
- 1997: Chris Harmse (RSA)
- 1999: Stéphane Tolbize (MRI)
- 2000: Not held
- 2001: Eric Koo Wan Siong (MRI)

=== Javelin throw ===
- 1995: Roland Vermeulen (ZIM)
- 1997: Marius Corbett (RSA)
- 1999: Alfred Ngwenya (ZIM)
- 2000: Flopas Chafa (ZIM)
- 2001: Alfred Ngwenya (ZIM)
- 2003: Pisikani Lekwalo (BOT)
- 2005: Cleopas Chigwende (ZIM)

=== 4 × 100 metres relay ===
- 1995: Zimbabwe
- 1997: South Africa
- 1999: Botswana
- 2000: Mauritius
- 2001: Zimbabwe
- 2003: Zimbabwe
- 2005: Mauritius

=== 4 × 400 metres relay ===
- 1995: Botswana
- 1997: South Africa
- 1999: Botswana
- 2000: Zimbabwe
- 2001: Botswana
- 2003: Zimbabwe
- 2005: Botswana

== Women's champions ==
=== 100 metres ===
- 1995: Anabelle Auguste (MRI)
- 1997: Anel van Niekerk (RSA)
- 1999: Gaily Dube (ZIM)
- 2000: Winnet Dube (ZIM)
- 2001: Winnet Dube (ZIM)
- 2003: Janice Josephs (RSA)
- 2005: Sandra Chimwaza (ZIM)

=== 200 metres ===
- 1995: Simangele Ncube (ZIM)
- 1997: Anel van Niekerk (RSA)
- 1999: Heide Seyerling (RSA)
- 2000: Winnet Dube (ZIM)
- 2001: Winnet Dube (ZIM)
- 2003: Janice Josephs (RSA)
- 2005: Racheal Nachula (ZAM)

=== 400 metres ===
- 1995: Ditapelo Molethi (BOT)
- 1997: Leanie van der Walt (RSA)
- 1999: Heide Seyerling (RSA)
- 2000: Lilian Bwalya (ZAM)
- 2001: Kundai Sengudzwa (ZIM)
- 2003: Amantle Montsho (BOT)
- 2005: Racheal Nachula (ZAM)

=== 800 metres ===
- 1995: Julia Sakara (ZIM)
- 1997: Mari-Louise Henning (RSA)
- 1999: Catherine Maapela (RSA)
- 2000: Tabitha Tsatsa (ZIM)
- 2001: Sharon Tavengwa (ZIM)
- 2003: Sharon Tavengwa (ZIM)
- 2005: Leonora Piuza (MOZ)

=== 1500 metres ===
- 1995: Julia Sakara (ZIM)
- 1997: René Kalmer (RSA)
- 1999: Samukeliso Moyo (ZIM)
- 2000: Easter Mathemera (ZIM)
- 2001: Catherine Maapela (RSA)
- 2003: Elizet Banda (ZAM)
- 2005: Sharon Tavengwa (ZIM)

=== 5000 metres ===
- 1995: Letiwe Marakurwa (ZIM)
- 1997: Samukeliso Moyo (ZIM)
- 1999: Samukeliso Moyo (ZIM)
- 2000: Samukeliso Moyo (ZIM)
- 2001: Catherine Chikwakwa (MAW)
- 2003: Catherine Chikwakwa (MAW)
- 2005: Catherine Chikwakwa (MAW)

=== 10,000 metres ===
- 1995: Esther Nherera (ZIM)
- 1997: Not held
- 1999: Message Mapfumo (ZIM)
- 2000: Not held
- 2001: Agnes Phiri (ZIM)
- 2003: Catherine Chikwakwa (MAW)
- 2005: Catherine Chikwakwa (MAW)

=== 100 metres hurdles ===
- 1995: Dafros Mudyirwa (ZIM)
- 1997: Corien Botha (RSA)
- 1999: Chantal Migale (REU)
- 2000: Rennie Chivunga (ZIM)
- 2001: Not held
- 2003: Not held
- 2005: Telma Cossa (MOZ)

=== 400 metres hurdles ===
- 1995: Not held
- 1997: Yvonne Ntini (ZIM)
- 1999: Nivea Sekele (RSA)
- 2000: Rennie Chivunga (ZIM)
- 2001: Not held
- 2003: Not held
- 2005: Julieta Magaia (MOZ)

=== High jump ===
- 1995: Sitty Shava (ZIM)
- 1997: Hestrie Cloete (RSA)
- 1999: Philippa Erasmus (RSA)
- 2000: Malemba Phiri (ZIM)
- 2001: Not held
- 2003: Ntunji Chella (ZAM)
- 2005: Arielle Brette (MRI)

=== Pole vault ===
- 2000: Nancy Cheekoussen (MRI)

=== Long jump ===
- 1995: Béryl Laramé (SEY)
- 1997: Corien Botha (RSA)
- 1999: Ria Fourie (RSA)
- 2000: Sitty Shava (ZIM)
- 2001: Memory Chituruman (ZIM)
- 2003: Rosia Oeybedosi (MOZ)
- 2005: Rosia Machava (MOZ)

=== Triple jump ===
- 1995: Béryl Laramé (SEY)
- 1997: Sitty Shava (ZIM)
- 1999: Ria Fourie (RSA)
- 2000: Not held
- 2001: Ramona Gabriels (RSA)
- 2003: Gladys Mateyo (ZAM)
- 2005: Dominique Merca (REU)

=== Shot put ===
- 1995: Not held
- 1997: Maranelle du Toit (RSA)
- 1999: Veronica Abrahamse (RSA)
- 2000: Ndakaziva Mapanda (ZIM)
- 2001: Veronica Abrahamse (RSA)
- 2003: Felistus Bwalya (ZAM)
- 2005: Tlhalefang Seleke (BOT)

=== Discus throw ===
- 1995: Ndakaziva Mapanda (ZIM)
- 1997: Lezelle Duvenage (RSA)
- 1999: Lezelle Duvenage (RSA)
- 2000: Ndakaziva Mapanda (ZIM)
- 2001: Veronica Abrahamse (RSA)
- 2003: Miriam Mukulama (ZAM)
- 2005: Miriam Mukulama (ZAM)

=== Javelin throw ===
- 1995: Chido Chitsatso (ZIM)
- 1997: Bernadette Ravina (MRI)
- 1999: Lindy Leveaux-Agricole (SEY)
- 2000: Ndakaziva Mapanda (ZIM)
- 2001: Gretha Palmer (RSA)
- 2003: Miriam Mukulama (ZAM)
- 2005: Nthabiseng Mahlanza (LES)

=== 4 × 100 metres relay ===
- 1995: Zimbabwe
- 1997: South Africa
- 1999: Zimbabwe
- 2000: Mashonaland East, Zimbabwe
- 2001: Zimbabwe
- 2003: Zambia
- 2005: Zimbabwe

=== 4 × 400 metres relay ===
- 1995: Zimbabwe
- 1997: South Africa
- 1999: South Africa
- 2000: Zambia
- 2001: Zimbabwe
- 2003: Zambia
- 2005: Zambia
