= West African Athletics Championships =

International athletics competition

- Genre: outdoor track and field
- Venue: varied
- Inaugurated: 1997
- Participants: West African nations
- Organiser: Confederation of African Athletics

The West African Athletics Championships is an international athletics competition between West African nations, organised by the Confederation of African Athletics (CAA).

The event was first held in 1997, two years after a combined West and North African Athletics Championships, and was contested on four occasions until 2005. The event was relaunched as a biennial, senior and under-20 competition in 2017 under the official title of the CAA Region 2 African Championships.

Nigeria, the largest nation in the region, did not take part in 1997 or 2005. As a result, the competition was an opportunity for athletes from smaller nations in the region to train and prepare for larger scale athletics championships.

The CAA began to organise other regional African championships in the same period, including the East African Athletics Championships, North African Athletics Championships and African Southern Region Athletics Championships.

Among other athletics events to be held for the region were the West African Games in 1977 and the West African Cross Country Championships in 1996.

== Editions ==
=== West African Athletics Championships ===
| Edition | Year | City | Country | Date | Nations | Athletes |
|---|---|---|---|---|---|---|
| 1 | 1997 | Cotonou | Benin | | | |
| 2 | 1999 | Bamako | Mali | | | |
| 3 | 2001 | Lagos | Nigeria | | | |
| 4 | 2005 | Dakar | Senegal | 29–30 April | | |

=== CAA Region 2 African Championships ===
| Edition | Year | City | Country | Date | Nations | Athletes |
|---|---|---|---|---|---|---|
| 1 | 2017 | Conakry | Guinea | 12–14 May | | |
| 2 | 2019 | Niamey | Niger | 25–27 July | | |

== Events ==
The competition programme features 33 regular athletics events: six track running events, two hurdles events, three jumps, three throws, and two relay races for both the sexes, plus a men's 10,000 metres.

Track running

- 100 metres, 200 metres, 400 metres, 800 metres, 1500 metres, 5000 metres, 10,000 metres (men only)

Obstacle events

- 100 metres hurdles (women only), 110 metres hurdles (men only), 400 metres hurdles

Jumping events

- High jump, long jump, triple jump

Throwing events

- Shot put, discus throw, javelin throw

Relay events

- 4 × 100 metres relay, 4 × 400 metres relay

Several events were held once only, including a men's 3000 metres steeplechase in 1997, and hammer throw and 2000 m race walk for both men and women in 2001. Pole vault was not available as an event for either sex.
