= European Masters Athletics Championship =

European Masters Athletics Championship may refer to:

- European Masters Outdoor Athletics Championships
- European Masters Indoor Athletics Championships
- European Masters Athletics Championships Non-Stadia
- European Masters Mountain Running Championships
