= North African Championships =

North African Championships may refer to:

- North African Athletics Championships
- North African Cross Country Championships

== See also ==
- West and North African Athletics Championships
