= Para athletics =

Paralympic sport

Logo of World Para Athletics

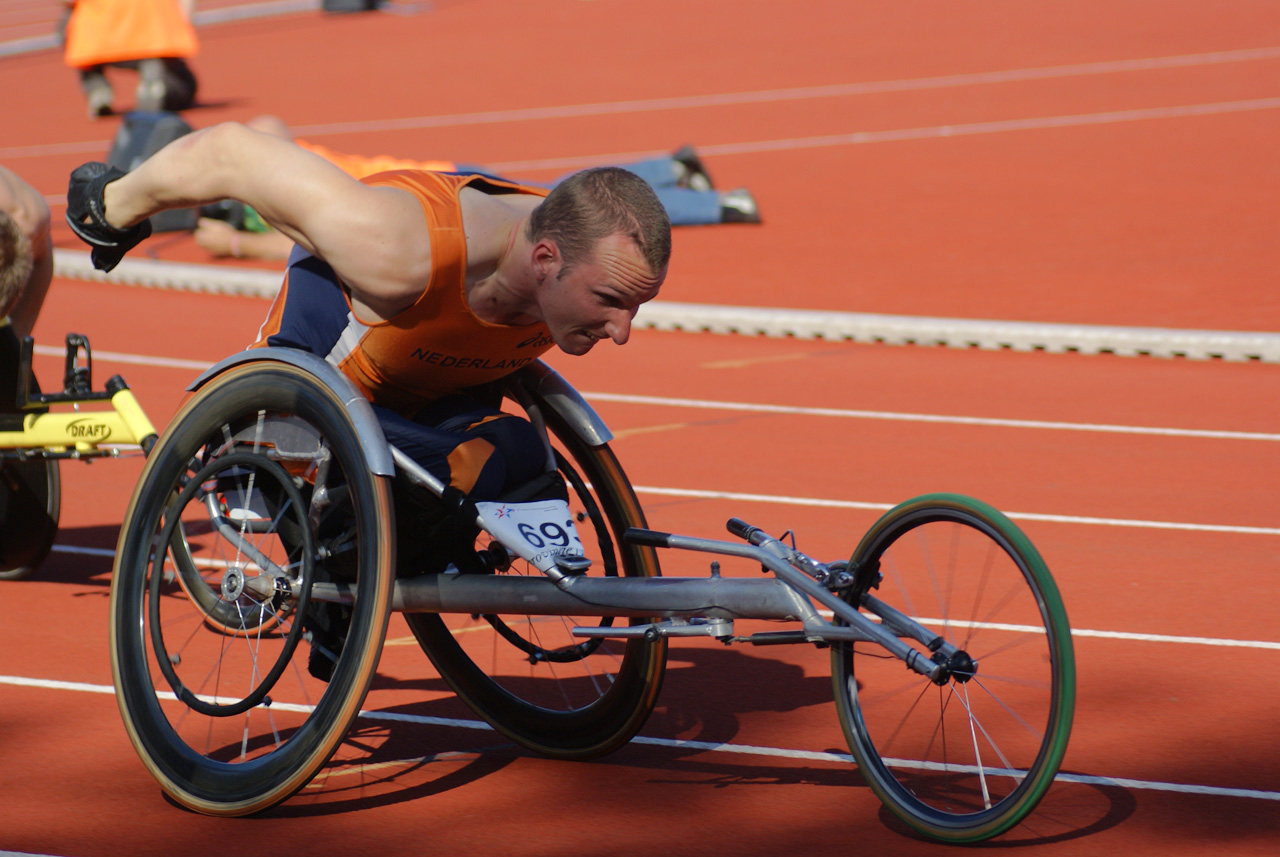
Kenny van Weeghel in his racing chair at the 2006 IPC Athletics World Championships

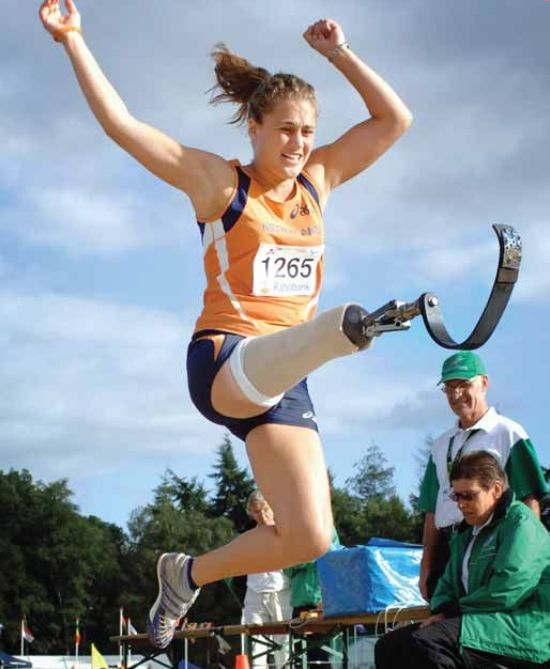
Annette Roozen competing in the long jump with her prosthetic leg.

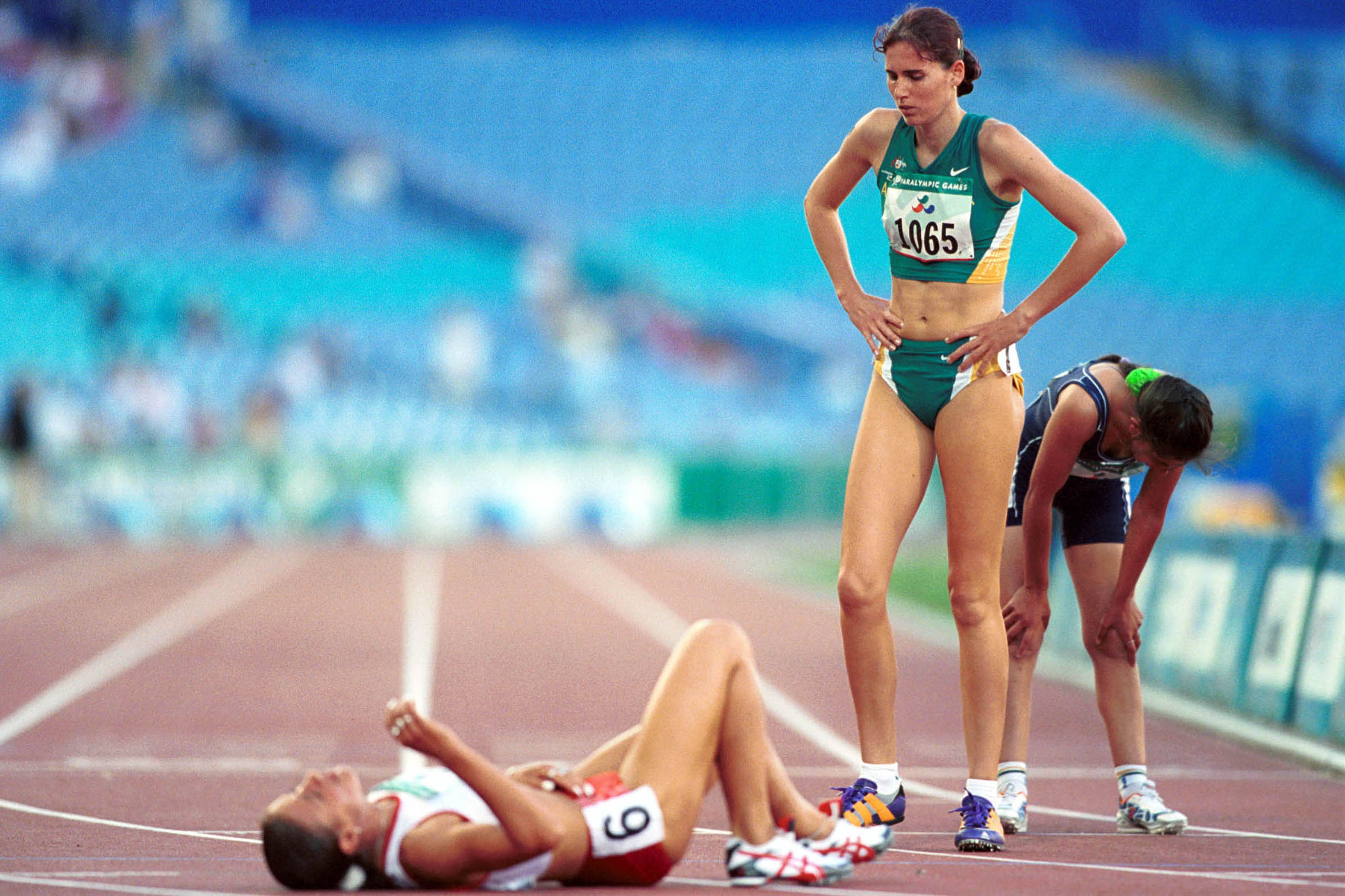
Athletes with an intellectual disability after racing at the 2000 Summer Paralympics

Para athletics is the sport of athletics practiced by people with a disability as a Para sport. The athletics events within the Para sport are mostly the same as those available to able-bodied people, with two major exceptions in wheelchair racing and the club throw, which are specific to the division. Certain able-bodied events are rarely contested as Para athletic events outside deaf sport; pole vault, triple jump, hammer (of which the club throw is sometimes considered the Para athletic equivalent) and the three hurdling events. The sport is known by various names, including disability athletics, disabled track and field and Paralympic athletics. Competitors may be called either Para atheletes or athletes with disability.

== Governance ==
Competitors are typically organised into three broad categories: deaf sports, athletes with a physical disability, and athletes with an intellectual disability. Deaf athletes typically compete among themselves at events such as the Deaflympics, or in able-bodied events (such as British hammer thrower Charlotte Payne) while athletes with physical and intellectual disabilities are usually assessed and given a Para athletics classification, which groups together athletes with similar ability levels. These classifications are governed by the International Paralympic Committee (IPC) and comprise a single letter and a number: T for Track or F for Field, then a number defining the level of ability. In competition, events may take place between athletes of identical class if numbers are sufficient, otherwise a range of similar classes may compete in the same event. The Raza point score system can be used in field events to allow athletes of different abilities to directly compete.

International governance operates outside of the sport's able-bodied governing body World Athletics (until 2019: IAAF) and instead is divided among those categories, with deaf athletics overseen by the International Committee of Sports for the Deaf (CISS), Para athletics for the physical disabled principally governed by the World Para Athletics subcommittee of the IPC, and Para athletics for the intellectually disabled through the International Sports Federation for Persons with Intellectual Disability (INAS). There are also condition-specific organisations, such as the International Dwarf Sports Federation and International Athletics Association for Persons with Down Syndrome. Rules for the sport are adapted from those set forth by the World Athletics, with the majority of rules for Para athletics being the same as those for able-bodied competitions, with exceptions that account for competitors' abilities, such as a visual signal instead of a starting pistol in races for the deaf.

Para athletics has been one of the sports at the Paralympic Games since 1960, though deaf athletes and most athletes with an intellectual disability compete separately at the Deaflympics and Special Olympics World Games, respectively. The three major sport-specific world championships for Para athletics are the World Para Athletics Championships, the World Deaf Athletics Championships and the INAS World Athletics Championships. Other major Para athletics competitions are hosted within the IWAS World Games and the INAS Global Games.

== Nomenclature ==
The name of the sport is ultimately derived from the Paralympic movement, the Paralympic Games and the name of the international Paralympic Committee. 'Paralympic' was originally a portmanteau of Olympic and paraplegic, reflecting the roots of the movement among spinal injury patients at Stoke Mandeville Hospital under Sir Ludwig Guttmann, but as the Paralympic Games gained popularity and prestige, and importantly, expanded to other non-spinal classes such as cerebral palsy, vision impairment and running with prosthetics, the reasoning behind the Para part of the name was changed to emphasise that the Games and the Movement were parallel (and thus equal) to the Olympics.

As a result 'Para' came to be recognised as a standard prefix to denote all disability sports, and as organisations were formed by the International Paralympic Committee to organise and regulate the different disability sports, a practice emerged, particularly in sports with multiple disability classifications, of describing the sports with the prefix Para, including in the names of the organisations formed by the IPC to run them e.g. World Para Swimming, or the UCI-recognised discipline of Para cycling. The IPC Athletics Committee thus changed its name to World Para Athletics, with Para athletics itself a portmanteau of Para and athletics. The main stand-alone championships of the sport are now referred to as the World Para Athletics Championships - itself mirroring the change in the able-bodied events when the IAAF change its branding to World Athletics.

== Classification ==
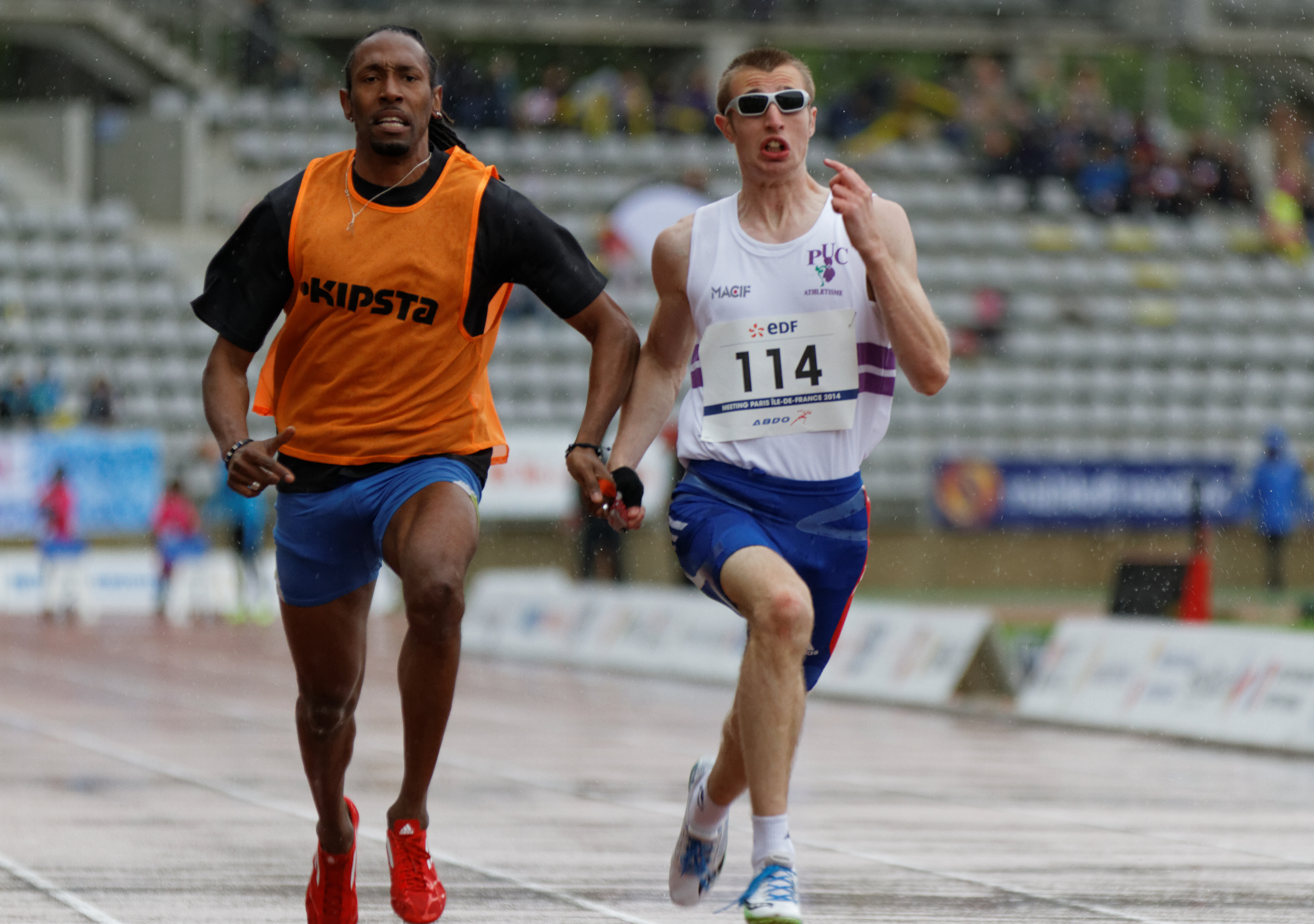
Timothée Adolphe and his sighted guide Cédric Felip

Competitors at elite level competitions are classified by disability, to arrange athletes with a similar disability in the same event. A classified T12 athlete for example, is a track athlete with a visual impairment.

- F = Field athletes
- T = Track athletes
- 11–13 = Visual impairment. 11 and 12 compete with a sighted guide.
- 20 = Intellectual impairment
- 31–38 = Cerebral palsy
- 40–41 = dwarfism
- 42–46 = Amputation, and others
- 51–57 = Wheelchair

In wheelchair racing, athletes compete in lightweight racing chairs. Most major marathons have wheelchair divisions and the elite racers consistently beat the runners on foot.

== Events ==
Paralympic athletes compete in the following events. Note that not all events may feature at a particular tournament, and not all events may be open to all classifications:

Track				Road	Field		Combined events
Sprints	Middle-distance	Long-distance	Relays	Road	Jumps	Throws	Combined events
100 m 200 m 400 m	800 m 1500 m	5000 m 10,000 m	4 × 100 m relay 4 × 400 m relay	Marathon	Long jump Triple jump High jump	Shot put Discus throw Javelin throw Club throw	Pentathlon

== Grand Prix ==
In 2017 rename from IPC Athletics Grand Prix to World Para Athletics Grand Prix. Its purpose is the development of this sport as well as the classification and obtaining the Paralympic quota. An annual series of elite track and field athletic competitions comprising six to nine of the best athletics meetings.

Since 2013 an annual Grand Prix season.

Since 2016 wheelchair racers as part of the World Marathon Majors series.

1. 2013 IPC Athletics Grand Prix - 7 Meetings
2. World Para Athletics - Grand Prix 2014 - 9 Meetings
3. 2015 IPC Athletics Grand Prix - 9+1 Meetings
4. IPC Athletics 2016 Grand Prix - 9+1 Meetings
5. 2017 World Para Athletics Grand Prix - 9 Meetings
6. 2018 World Para Athletics Grand Prix - 9 Meetings
7. World Para Athletics Grand Prix 2019 - 9 Meetings
8. WORLD PARA ATHLETICS GRAND PRIX 2020 - 9 Meetings (all of events have been cancelled) World Para Athletics 2020 season: Status update
9. WORLD PARA ATHLETICS GRAND PRIX 2021 - 6 Meetings
10. WORLD PARA ATHLETICS GRAND PRIX 2022 - 7 Meetings
11. WORLD PARA ATHLETICS GRAND PRIX 2023 - 6 Meetings

== See also ==
- Athletics at the Summer Paralympics
- World Para Athletics Championships
- World Para Athletics Junior Championships
- Diamond League
