= South Pacific Athletics Championships =

Annual track and field competition

- Status: defunct
- Genre: Athletics championship
- Inaugurated: 1976
- Most recent: 1984
- Area: South Pacific Ocean islands

The South Pacific Athletics Championships were an international athletics competition between island nations of the South Pacific Ocean. The championships was contested on three occasions: it was first held in 1976, had its second edition in 1978, then its final edition in 1984. Ten nations won medals at the competition during its lifetime. The competition emerged as a single-sport championship following in the footsteps of the region's multi-sport event established in 1963: the South Pacific Games. The athletics competition declined with the emergence of the South Pacific Mini Games in 1981, which was a smaller-scale event with athletics as its core sport.

== Editions ==
Ed.	Year	City	Country	Dates	No. of events	No. of nations	No. of athletes	Winning nation
1	1976	Nouméa	New Caledonia		37			
2	1978	Pirae	French Polynesia		37			
3	1984	Suva	Fiji		38			

== Events ==
The competition programme featured a total of 38 individual championship athletics events, 22 for men and 16 for women. For each of the sexes, there were six track running events, two obstacle events, three jumps, two throws, and one combined track and field event. The women's programme featured fewer events than the men's: women did not compete in distance events longer than 3000 m, and only men contested the steeplechase, pole vault, triple jump, and hammer throw. Men and women had a pentathlon in the first two editions, with this being replaced by a men's octathlon and women's heptathlon at the final edition. A women's 400 m hurdles was contested once only in 1984, as this event gained international acceptance during this period.

Track running

- 100 metres, 200 metres, 400 metres, 800 metres, 1500 metres, 3000 metres (women only), 5000 metres (men only), 10,000 metres (men only)

Obstacle events

- 100 metres hurdles (women only), 110 metres hurdles (men only), 400 metres hurdles, 3000 metres steeplechase (men only)

Jumping events

- Pole vault (men only), high jump, long jump, triple jump (men only)

Throwing events

- Shot put, discus throw, javelin throw, hammer throw (men only)

Combined track and field events

- Pentathlon, Octathlon (men only), Heptathlon (women only)

Relay

- 4 × 100 metres relay, 4 × 400 metres relay

Road running

- Marathon (men only)

== Participants ==
- Fiji
- French Polynesia
- Nauru
- New Caledonia
- Papua New Guinea
- Samoa
- Solomon Islands
- Tonga
- Vanuatu (New Hebrides in first two editions)
- Wallis and Futuna
