= Baltic Match Throwing =

Track and field competition between athletes from Baltic states

Baltic Match Throwing (Estonian: Heitealade Balti maavõistlus, Latvian: Baltijas valstu mačsacīkste mešanu disciplīnās, Lithuanian: Baltijos šalių metimų mačas) is an annual outdoor track and field competition between the Baltic states (Estonia, Latvia and Lithuania). The competition features shot put, discus throw, hammer throw and javelin throw for both men and women. In addition to the senior events, these are also age category events for under-18, under-20 and under-23 athletes. Belarus was invited to compete at the 2014 edition.

== Editions ==
#	Year	City	Country	Date	Venue	Events	Countries	Athletes	Winner	Notes
1st	2011	Valmiera	Latvia	1 October	Jānis Daliņš Stadium	32	3	-	Estonia	
2nd	2012	Karksi-Nuia	Estonia	22 September	Karksi-Nuia Gymnasium's Stadium	32	3	77	Estonia	
3rd	2013	Alytus	Lithuania	25 May	Alytus Stadium	32	3	-	Estonia	
4th	2014	Valmiera	Latvia	24 May	Jānis Daliņš Stadium	32	4	-	Estonia	
5th	2015	Karksi-Nuia	Estonia	24 May	Karksi-Nuia Gymnasium's Stadium	32	3	-	Estonia	
6th	2016	Alytus	Lithuania	14 May	Alytus Stadium	32	3	-	Estonia	
7th	2017	Valmiera	Latvia	27 May	Jānis Daliņš Stadium	32	3	-	Estonia	
8th	2018	Rakvere	Estonia	26 May	Rakvere Linnastaadion	32	3	-	Estonia	

== See also ==
- European Throwing Cup
