= Baltic Indoor Athletics Championships =

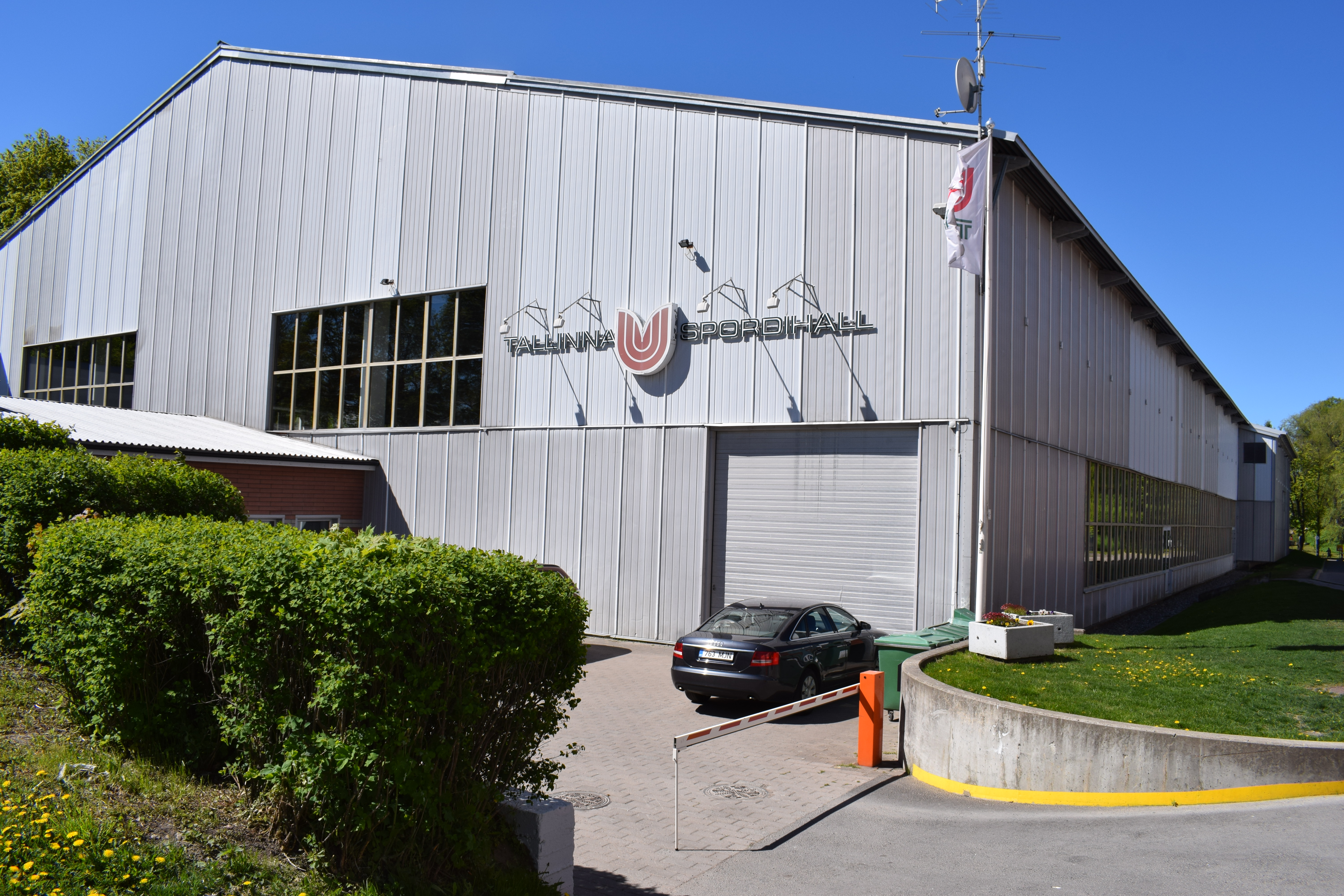
The Tallinn Sports Hall hosted half of the championships

The Baltic Indoor Athletics Championships (Estonian: Balti maavõistlus, Latvian: Baltijas valstu sacensības, Lithuanian: Baltijos šalių mačas) was an annual indoor track and field competition between athletes from the Baltic states (Estonia, Latvia, Lithuania). The competition featured 26 individual events, divided evenly between the sexes, and had team titles for each sex and an overall combined team title.

Hosting duties for the competition passed between Estonia and Lithuania, with Tallinn holding the event seven times, Kaunas three times, and Panevėžys twice. The competition was held each February from 1995 to 2006. It was a two-day competition until 2001, after which it was contested over a single day. The final competition in 2006 was between Latvia and Lithuania only.

The competition's lifetime overlapped with the Baltic Sea Games, a multi-sport event which was hosted in Tallinn in 1993 and Kaunas in 1997.

== Editions ==
#	Year	City	Country	Date	Venue	Events	Nations	Athletes	Men's winner	Women's winner	Ref.
1st	1995	Panevėžys	Lithuania	25–26 February	Panevėžys Lengvosios atletikos maniezas	25	3	-			
2nd	1996	Tallinn	Estonia	24–25 February	Tallinn Sports Hall		3	-			
3rd	1997	Tallinn	Estonia	22–23 February	Tallinn Sports Hall		3	-			
4th	1998	Panevėžys	Lithuania	14–15 February	Panevėžys Lengvosios atletikos maniezas	26	3	-	Estonia	Latvia	
5th	1999	Tallinn	Estonia	17–18 February	Tallinn Sports Hall	26	3	-			
6th	2000	Tallinn	Estonia	15–16 February	Tallinn Sports Hall	26	3	-			
7th	2001	Kaunas	Lithuania	21–22 February	LKKA maniežas	26	3	-	Estonia	Lithuania	
8th	2002	Tallinn	Estonia	20 February	Tallinn Sports Hall	26	3	-			
9th	2003	Tallinn	Estonia	27 February	Tallinn Sports Hall	26	3	-	Estonia	Estonia	
10th	2004	Kaunas	Lithuania	22 February	LKKA maniežas	26	3	-			
11th	2005	Tallinn	Estonia	19 February	Lasnamäe Indoor Arena	26	3	-	Estonia	Estonia	
12th	2006	Kaunas	Lithuania	26 February	LKKA maniežas	26	2	-			

== Events ==
=== Men ===
↓ Events	1995	1996	1997	1998	1999	2000	2001	2002	2003	2004	2005	2006
60 metres	X			X	X	X	X	X	X	X	X	X
200 metres	X			X	X	X	X	X	X	X	X	X
400 metres	X			X	X	X	X	X	X	X	X	X
800 metres	X			X	X	X	X	X	X	X	X	X
1500 metres	X			X	X	X	X	X	X	X	X	X
3000 metres	X	X	X	X	X	X	X	X	X	X	X	X
60 metres hurdles	X			X	X	X	X	X	X	X	X	X
4 × 200 metres relay	X			X	X	X	X	X	X	X	X	X
High jump	X			X	X	X	X	X	X	X	X	X
Pole vault	X			X	X	X	X	X	X	X	X	X
Long jump	X			X	X	X	X	X	X	X	X	X
Triple jump	X			X	X	X	X	X	X	X	X	X
Shot put	X			X	X	X	X	X	X	X	X	X

=== Women's ===
↓ Events	1995	1996	1997	1998	1999	2000	2001	2002	2003	2004	2005	2006
60 metres	X			X	X	X	X	X	X	X	X	X
200 metres	X			X	X	X	X	X	X	X	X	X
400 metres	X			X	X	X	X	X	X	X	X	X
800 metres	X			X	X	X	X	X	X	X	X	X
1500 metres	X			X	X	X	X	X	X	X	X	X
3000 metres	X	X	X	X	X	X	X	X	X	X	X	X
60 metres hurdles	X			X	X	X	X	X	X	X	X	X
4 × 200 metres relay	X			X	X	X	X	X	X	X	X	X
High jump	X			X	X	X	X	X	X	X	X	X
Pole vault	–			X	X	X	X	X	X	X	X	X
Long jump	X			X	X	X	X	X	X	X	X	X
Triple jump	X			X	X	X	X	X	X	X	X	X
Shot put	X			X	X	X	X	X	X	X	X	X

== See also ==
- Finland-Sweden Athletics International
