= IAADS World Athletics Championships =

International para-athletics competition

The IAADS World Athletics Championships is an annual global athletics competition for athletes with Down syndrome, organised by the International Athletics Association for Persons with Down Syndrome (IAADS).

The competition was established in 2010, two years after the founding of the international body. It was created to enable athletes with Down syndrome to compete for world titles in track and field, following the exclusion of intellectual disability categories by the International Paralympic Committee. Though learning disability events were restored at the Summer Paralympic Games, there was no category specifically for Down syndrome – this effectively excluded the athletes, who were forced to compete against other intellectually disabled athletes who did not have the physical impairments that are typical of the condition.

The global competition was complemented by the regional IAADS European Athletics Championships from 2011 onwards.

== Editions ==
#	Year	Country	City
1	2010	Mexico	Puerto Vallarta
2	2012	Portugal	Azores
3	2014	South Africa	Bloemfontein
4	2016	Italy	Florence
5	2018	Portugal	Funchal
6	2022	Czech Republic	Nymburk
7	2024	Turkey	Antalya
8	2026	Bulgaria	Sofia

== See also ==
- World Deaf Athletics Championships
