= World Para Athletics Championships =

World championships for disability athletics

- Most recent season or competition: 2025 World Para Athletics Championships
- Formerly: IPC Athletics World Championships (1994–2017)
- Sport: Athletics
- Founded: 1994
- Continent: International (IPC)

The World Para Athletics Championships, known as the IPC Athletics World Championships prior to 2017, are a biennial Paralympic athletics event organized by World Para Athletics, a subcommittee of the International Paralympic Committee (IPC). It features athletics events contested by athletes with physical disabilities. The first IPC Athletics World Championships were held in Berlin, Germany in 1994.

They are a Paralympic parallel to the World Athletics Championships for able-bodied athletes. Since 2011, when they switched from a quadrennial scheduling to biennial, the IPC championships have been held in the same years as the IAAF championships, although they are separate events and are not necessarily held in the same host city. In 2017, London, which previously hosted the 2012 Summer Paralympics, became the first city to host both the IAAF World Championships and World Para Athletics Championships in the same year and as connected events.

== Editions ==
#	Year	Host City	Host country	Dates	Venue	Events	Athletes	Nations	Best Nation
IPC Athletics World Championships
1	1994	Berlin	Germany	22–31 July	Berlin Olympiastadion		1154	63	
2	1998	Birmingham	United Kingdom	6–16 August	Alexander Stadium		+1000	61	
3	2002	Lille	France	20–28 July	Stadium Nord Lille Métropole		+1000	75	China
4	2006	Assen	Netherlands	2–10 September	Sports Park Stadsbroek	203	1097	76	China
5	2011	Christchurch	New Zealand	21–30 January	Queen Elizabeth II Park	213	1060	80	China
6	2013	Lyon	France	19–28 July	Stade du Rhône	207	1073	118	Russia
7	2015	Doha	Qatar	22–31 October	Suheim Bin Hamad Stadium	212	1230	96	China
World Para Athletics Championships
8	2017	London	United Kingdom	14–23 July	Olympic Stadium, Stratford	210	1074	92	China
9	2019	Dubai	United Arab Emirates	7–15 November	Dubai Club for People of Determination	172	1365	118	China
10	2023	Paris	France	8–17 July	Stade Charléty	171	1206	103	China
11	2024	Kobe	Japan	17–25 May	Universiade Memorial Stadium	168	1073	103	China
12	2025	New Delhi	India	26 September–5 October	Jawaharlal Nehru Stadium	184	1182	100	Brazil
13	2027	Tashkent	Uzbekistan	June	Olympic City Stadium				

== Medal table (1994-2025) ==
Last updated after the 2025 World Para Athletics Championships

Rank	Nation	Gold	Silver	Bronze	Total
1	China (CHN)	221	206	163	590
2	Great Britain (GBR)	161	131	132	424
3	United States (USA)	155	175	168	498
4	Australia (AUS)	127	112	108	347
5	Brazil (BRA)	124	112	118	354
6	Germany (GER)	120	117	125	362
7	Russia (RUS)	108	84	83	275
8	Poland (POL)	88	80	77	245
9	Ukraine (UKR)	85	73	80	238
10	Canada (CAN)	81	70	68	219
11	Tunisia (TUN)	66	53	45	164
12	South Africa (RSA)	64	61	61	186
13	Switzerland (SUI)	62	56	36	154
14	Iran (IRI)	62	50	48	160
15	Algeria (ALG)	57	58	46	161
16	Spain (ESP)	56	59	73	188
17	France (FRA)	48	51	51	150
18	Cuba (CUB)	41	10	8	59
19	Mexico (MEX)	38	44	62	144
20	Netherlands (NED)	38	34	30	102
21	Italy (ITA)	37	29	31	97
22	Japan (JPN)	33	54	80	167
23	Morocco (MAR)	28	22	28	78
24	Belgium (BEL)	27	15	15	57
25	Uzbekistan (UZB)	26	24	12	62
26	Ireland (IRL)	25	21	26	72
27	New Zealand (NZL)	24	36	19	79
28	Colombia (COL)	23	34	29	86
29	Thailand (THA)	23	22	29	74
30	Greece (GRE)	20	28	36	84
31	Latvia (LAT)	20	8	5	33
32	Austria (AUT)	19	32	21	72
–	Neutral Paralympic Athletes (NPA)	19	29	36	84
33	India (IND)	19	24	24	67
34	Belarus (BLR)	19	17	22	58
35	Czech Republic (CZE)	18	31	31	80
36	Egypt (EGY)	16	29	30	75
37	Portugal (POR)	15	24	26	65
38	Lithuania (LTU)	15	17	12	44
39	Finland (FIN)	14	24	24	62
40	Bulgaria (BUL)	14	10	11	35
41	Sweden (SWE)	13	21	15	49
42	Azerbaijan (AZE)	12	8	9	29
43	Kenya (KEN)	11	12	11	34
44	Croatia (CRO)	10	12	18	40
45	Malaysia (MAS)	10	6	8	24
46	Kuwait (KUW)	10	6	7	23
47	Denmark (DEN)	9	15	11	35
48	Hungary (HUN)	9	7	9	25
49	United Arab Emirates (UAE)	8	15	12	35
50	Serbia (SRB)	8	12	9	29
51	Ecuador (ECU)	8	8	7	23
52	Hong Kong (HKG)	8	4	3	15
53	Iceland (ISL)	8	3	5	16
54	Slovakia (SVK)	6	8	10	24
55	Norway (NOR)	6	3	9	18
56	Argentina (ARG)	5	14	14	33
57	Namibia (NAM)	4	11	8	23
58	Chile (CHI)	4	6	1	11
59	Jordan (JOR)	4	5	4	13
60	Saudi Arabia (KSA)	4	5	3	12
61	South Korea (KOR)	4	4	9	17
62	Ivory Coast (CIV)	4	0	1	5
63	Turkey (TUR)	3	10	15	28
64	Iraq (IRQ)	3	10	8	21
65	Chinese Taipei (TPE)	3	1	1	5
66	Venezuela (VEN)	2	11	11	24
67	Czechoslovakia (TCH)	2	8	7	17
68	Slovenia (SLO)	2	5	4	11
69	Jamaica (JAM)	2	5	2	9
70	Indonesia (INA)	2	4	9	15
71	Mauritius (MRI)	2	4	2	8
72	Bahrain (BHN)	2	3	1	6
72	Ethiopia (ETH)	2	3	1	6
74	Trinidad and Tobago (TTO)	2	1	3	6
75	Cyprus (CYP)	2	0	3	5
76	Nigeria (NGR)	1	4	1	6
77	Costa Rica (CRC)	1	2	1	4
77	Syria (SYR)	1	2	1	4
79	Qatar (QAT)	1	1	1	3
80	Cape Verde (CPV)	1	1	0	2
80	Dominican Republic (DOM)	1	1	0	2
80	Zimbabwe (ZIM)	1	1	0	2
83	Israel (ISR)	1	0	1	2
83	Peru (PER)	1	0	1	2
85	Georgia (GEO)	1	0	0	1
85	Libya (LBA)	1	0	0	1
85	Refugee Paralympic Team	1	0	0	1
85	Rwanda (RWA)	1	0	0	1
85	Uganda (UGA)	1	0	0	1
90	Angola (ANG)	0	5	4	9
91	Sri Lanka (SRI)	0	3	7	10
92	Estonia (EST)	0	2	3	5
93	Luxembourg (LUX)	0	2	0	2
93	Palestine (PLE)	0	2	0	2
95	Serbia and Montenegro (SCG)	0	1	1	2
95	Singapore (SGP)	0	1	1	2
97	Fiji (FIJ)	0	1	0	1
97	Oman (OMA)	0	1	0	1
97	Pakistan (PAK)	0	1	0	1
97	Puerto Rico (PUR)	0	1	0	1
101	Botswana (BOT)	0	0	2	2
101	International Paralympic Committee (IPC)	0	0	2	2
101	Kazakhstan (KAZ)	0	0	2	2
104	Bermuda (BER)	0	0	1	1
104	Bosnia and Herzegovina (BIH)	0	0	1	1
104	Moldova (MDA)	0	0	1	1
104	Mozambique (MOZ)	0	0	1	1
104	Uruguay (URU)	0	0	1	1
104	Vietnam (VIE)	0	0	1	1
Totals (109 entries)		2,464	2,448	2,413	7,325

- In this table, Serkan Yıldırım's medals in 2024 have been removed and the next ones have won medals. But the World Federation has not yet implemented it. He was reclassified due to medical fraud.

== Classification ==
- F = field athletes
- T = track athletes
- P = pentathlon
- 11-13: visually impaired, 11 and 12 compete with a sighted guide
- 20: intellectual disability
- 31-38: cerebral palsy or other conditions that affect muscle co-ordination and control. Athletes in class 31-34 compete in a seated position; athletes in class 35-38 compete standing.
- 40-41: small athletes.
- 42-43: impaired muscular power (without prosthesis) in the legs.
- 45-47: upper limb prosthesis.
- 51-57: spinal cord injuries. All races compete in wheel chairs. Everyone throws seated.
- 61-64 : athletes who have a prosthesis affected by lower limb deficiency and leg length difference.
- 71-72 : severe coordinations disorders. Practice only Frame Running.

== See also ==
- Para Athletics
- International Paralympic Committee
- Athletics at the Paralympics
- World Juniors Para Athletics Championships
- European Para Athletics Championships
- European Para Championships
- Asian Para Athletics Championships
- World Athletics Championships
- World Deaf Athletics Championships
- Asian Para Games
- African Para Games
- Parapan American Games
- Oceania Area Championships in Athletics#Para
