= African Southern Region Cross Country Championships =

Annual international cross country running competition

- Genre: cross country running
- Frequency: annual
- Venue: varies
- Participants: Southern African nations
- Organiser: Confederation of African Athletics

The African Southern Region Cross Country Championships is an annual international cross country running competition between Southern African nations, organised by the Confederation of African Athletics (CAA). Established in 1997, it is one of three regional cross country championships organised by the CAA, alongside the North and East African Cross Country Championships.

The competition is one of three senior athletics championships organised for the Southern region, alongside the main African Southern Region Athletics Championships and the African Southern Region Half Marathon Championships.

Senior and under-20 level races are held for both men and women, which have both individual and national team rankings. The championships previously featured senior short races over 4 km, but these were discontinued after 2006, in line with changes to the IAAF World Cross Country Championships programme.

== Editions ==
Edition	Year	City	Country	Date	Nations	Athletes
1	1997	?				
2	1998	?				
3	1999	Vacoas-Phoenix–Candos Hill	Mauritius			
4	2000	Victoria Falls	Zimbabwe			
5	2001	Blantyre	Malawi			
6	2002	Mohale's Hoek	Lesotho			
7	2003	Luanda	Angola			
8	2004	Lobamba	Swaziland			
9	2005	Vacoas-Phoenix–Candos Hill	Mauritius	19 February		
10	2006	Kumakwane	Botswana	25 February		
11	2007	Zomba	Malawi	24 February		
12	2008	Lusaka	Zambia	23 February		
13	2009	Gymkhana	Mauritius	28 February		
14	2010	?	Mauritius	February		
15	2011	Cape Town	South Africa	6 March		
16	2012	?	Mauritius	3 March		
17	2013	Maseru	Lesotho	2 March		
18	2014	Cancelled	Seychelles			
19	2015	Blantyre	Malawi	21 February		
20	2016	Cancelled	Swaziland	26 March		
21	2017	?				
22	2018	Vacoas-Phoenix	Mauritius	24 February		
23	2019	?				

== Champions ==
=== Long course ===
Year	Men's long course	Men's long course team	Women's long course	Women's long course team
1999	Kudakwashe Shoko (ZIM)	South Africa (RSA)	Samukeliso Moyo (ZIM)	South Africa (RSA)
2000	Michael Ngaseke (ZIM)	?	Tabitha Tsatsa (ZIM)	?
2001	Simon Mpholo (RSA)	?	Catherine Chikwakwa (MAW)	?
2002	Michael Ngaseke (ZIM)	Zimbabwe (ZIM)	Charné Rademeyer (RSA)	Zimbabwe (ZIM)
2003	Gabalele Moloko (BOT)	?	Poppy Mlambo (RSA)	?
2004	Kelvin Pangiso (ZIM)	Zambia (ZAM)	Catherine Chikwakwa (MAW)	Malawi (MAW)
2005	Luwis Masundo (ZIM)	South Africa (RSA)	Poppy Mlambo (RSA)	South Africa (RSA)
2006	Juwawo Wirimayi (ZIM)	?	Poppy Mlambo (RSA)	?

=== Short course ===
Year	Men's short course	Men's short course team	Women's short course	Women's short course team
2000	Michael Ngaseke (ZIM)	?	Tabitha Tsatsa (ZIM)	?
2001	Alex Majoni (MAW)	?	Not held	Not held
2002	Kudakwashe Shoko (ZIM)	Lesotho (LES)	Ronel Thomas (RSA)	Lesotho (LES)
2003	Menon Ramsamy (MRI)	?	Not held	Not held
2004	Moeketsi Mosuhli (LES)	Lesotho (LES)	Catherine Chikwakwa (MAW)	Malawi (MAW)
2005	Ruben Ramolefi (RSA)	South Africa (RSA)	Dina Lebo Phalula (RSA)	South Africa (RSA)
2006	Mandla Maseko (RSA)	?	Chanelle Olivier (RSA)	?

=== Junior ===
Year	Men's junior	Men's junior team	Women's junior	Women's junior team
2001	Francis Kanje (MAW)	?	Christel Arnold (RSA)	?
2002	Jan Moikwena (RSA)	South Africa (RSA)	Sharon Tavengwa (ZIM)	Lesotho (LES)
2003	Avelino Nsumbo (ANG)	?	Irvette van Zyl (RSA)	?
2004	Mike Tebulo (MAW)	Lesotho (LES)	Lucia Chandamale (MAW)	Lesotho (LES)
2005	Nkosinoxolo Sonqibido (RSA)	South Africa (RSA)	Irvette van Zyl (RSA)	South Africa (RSA)
2006	Siyabonga Nkonde (RSA)	?	Lenah Lotter (RSA)	?
