= African Southern Region Half Marathon Championships =

International road running competition

- Genre: half marathon
- Frequency: annual
- Venue: varies
- Participants: Southern African nations
- Organiser: Confederation of African Athletics

The African Southern Region Half Marathon Championships is an annual international long-distance road running competition over the half marathon distance (21.1 km) between Southern African nations, organised by the Confederation of African Athletics (CAA). It was established in 2000, and is one of three regional half marathon championships organised by the CAA, alongside the North and East African Half Marathon Championships.

The competition is one of three senior athletics championships organised for the Southern region, alongside the main African Southern Region Athletics Championships and the African Southern Region Cross Country Championships (both held in odd-numbered years)

A Southern African Marathon Championship was contested in 1989.

== Editions ==
Edition	Year	City	Country	Date	Nations	Athletes
1	2000	Gaborone	Botswana			
2	2001	Lusaka	Zambia			
3	2002	Belle Mare	Mauritius			
4	2003	Swakopmund	Namibia			
5	2004	Chitungwiza	Zimbabwe	10 October		
6	2005	Mahé	Seychelles	5 November		
7	2006	Maputo	Mozambique	24 September		
8	2007	Maseru	Lesotho	22 September		
9	2008	?				
10	2009	Moroni	Comoros	12 April		
11	2010	Blantyre	Malawi	September		
12	2011	Ezulwini	Swaziland	24 September		
13	2012	?				
14	2013	?				
15	2014	Swakopmund	Namibia	4 October		
16	2015	?	Lesotho	26 September		
17	2016	Antananarivo	Madagascar	4 September		
18	2017	Karibib	Namibia	16 September		
19	2018	Port Elizabeth	South Africa	28 July		
20	2019	Port Elizabeth	South Africa	27 July		

- The 2005 edition was held on a short course.

== Champions ==
Year	Men's individual	Men's team	Women's individual	Women's team
2000	Elijah Mutandiro (ZIM)	Zimbabwe (ZIM)	Margaret Mahohoma (ZIM)	Zimbabwe (ZIM)
2001	Medson Chibwe (ZAM)	?	Poppy Mlambo (RSA)	?
2002	Prosper Randriasoalaza (MAD)	?	Clarisse Rasoarizay (MAD)	?
2003	Mosalagae Kaelo (BOT)	?	Charné Rademeyer (RSA)	?
2004	Cuthbert Nyasango (ZIM)	Botswana (BOT)	Lucia Chandamale (MAW)	?
2005	Ndabili Bashigili (BOT)	Zimbabwe (ZIM)	Nokwanda Funani (RSA)	?
