= 2024 European Masters Athletics Championship Non-Stadia =

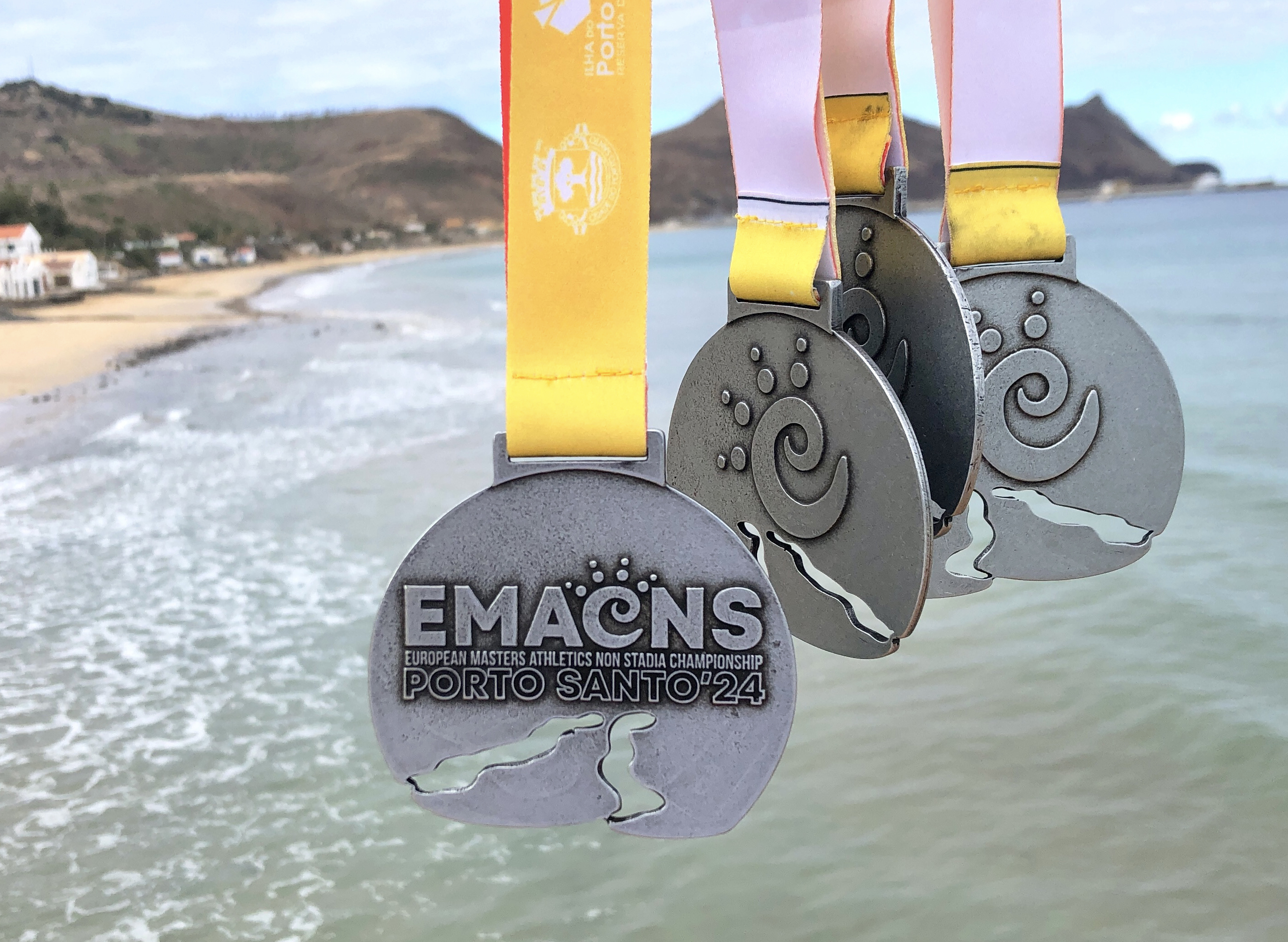
- Four silver medals with championship's logo
- Organisers: European Masters Athletics
- Edition: 19th
- Dates: 17–19 May
- Host city: Porto Santo
- Level: Masters
- Type: Non-Stadia
- Events: 10
- Participation: 423 athletes from 27 nations
- Official website: https://www.ema-madeira2024.com/

The European Masters Athletics Championship Non-Stadia 2024 were the 19th edition of the European Masters Athletics Championships Non-Stadia and were held in Porto Santo, Portugal, from 17 to 19 May 2024.

There was a total of 423 participants from 27 countries competing. 10 events were held: 10K run with team rankings, half marathon with team rankings, 10 kilometres race walk with team rankings, 20 kilometres race walk with team rankings, Nordic walking (10 and 5 km depending on age category) and cross country running relay 3×2 km. Portugal headed the medal table on 50 gold medals.

== Medals table ==
* Host nation (Portugal)

Rank	Nation	Gold	Silver	Bronze	Total
1	Portugal (POR)*	50	36	15	101
2	France (FRA)	19	6	8	33
3	Spain (ESP)	17	14	18	49
4	Switzerland (SUI)	15	8	9	32
5	Germany (GER)	11	5	14	30
6	Great Britain (GBR)	8	11	8	27
7	Latvia (LAT)	8	3	2	13
8	Italy (ITA)	7	10	4	21
9	Austria (AUT)	7	6	1	14
10	Poland (POL)	5	4	3	12
11	Czech Republic (CZE)	3	3	3	9
12	Belgium (BEL)	3	1	0	4
13	Ireland (IRL)	2	2	4	8
14	Slovenia (SLO)	1	1	0	2
14	Ukraine (UKR)	1	1	0	2
16	Hungary (HUN)	1	0	0	1
17	Sweden (SWE)	0	3	0	3
18	Finland (FIN)	0	2	0	2
19	Denmark (DEN)	0	1	1	2
20	Israel (ISR)	0	1	0	1
21	Estonia (EST)	0	0	1	1
Totals (21 entries)		158	118	91	367
