= 2000 World Masters Non-Stadia Athletics Championships =

- Host city: Valladolid, Spain
- Level: Masters
- Type: Non-Stadia

The fifth World Masters Non-Stadia Athletics Championships were held in Valladolid, Spain. The World Masters Athletics Championships serve the division of the sport of athletics for people over 35 years of age, referred to as masters athletics.
