= 1992 World Masters Non-Stadia Athletics Championships =

- Dates: 29-30 August
- Host city: Birmingham, United Kingdom
- Level: Masters
- Type: Non-Stadia
- Participation: 2483 athletes from 22 nations

The inaugural World Masters Non-Stadia Athletics Championships were held in Birmingham, United Kingdom, from August 29-30, 1992. The World Masters Athletics Championships serve the division of the sport of athletics for people over 35 years of age, referred to as masters athletics.
