= World Para Athletics Junior Championships =

International para athletics for junior athletes

- Most recent season or competition: 2019 World Para Athletics Junior Championships
- Sport: Athletics
- Founded: 2017
- Continent: World (World Para Athletics)

The World Para Athletics Junior Championships are a biennial Paralympic athletics event organized by World Para Athletics, a subcommittee of the International Paralympic Committee (IPC). It features athletics events contested by athletes with physical and intellectual disabilities in two age groups; under 20 and under 18. The first Championships were held in Nottwil, Switzerland in 2017, and will return there for the second edition in 2019. They are a partial Paralympic parallel to the IAAF World U20 Championships for able-bodied athletes, although both junior (under 20) and youth (under 18) events are held in the Paralympic equivalent.

== Championships ==
Edition	Year	City	Country	Date	Venue	No. of Events	No. of Athletes	Best Nation
1	2017	Nottwil	Switzerland	3–6 August	Sport Arena Nottwil	117	275	United States
2	2019	Nottwil	Switzerland	1–4 August	Sport Arena Nottwil	109	300	United States

== All-time combined medals ==
As of 2019.

Rank	Nation	Gold	Silver	Bronze	Total
1	United States (USA)	34	11	19	64
2	Brazil (BRA)	15	13	7	35
3	Great Britain (GBR)	15	12	9	36
4	Mexico (MEX)	15	10	6	31
5	Germany (GER)	13	14	11	38
6	India (IND)	13	9	6	28
7	Iran (IRN)	12	5	5	22
8	South Africa (RSA)	11	10	6	27
9	Japan (JPN)	11	1	4	16
10	Spain (ESP)	9	9	13	31
11	Colombia (COL)	8	5	3	16
12	Turkey (TUR)	8	3	2	13
13	Poland (POL)	6	8	2	16
14	Australia (AUS)	5	6	9	20
15	Belarus (BLR)	5	4	0	9
16	Ecuador (ECU)	5	3	2	10
17	Austria (AUT)	5	2	2	9
18	Croatia (CRO)	3	8	1	12
19	Argentina (ARG)	3	6	4	13
20	Portugal (POR)	3	5	1	9
21	Canada (CAN)	3	4	1	8
22	United Arab Emirates (UAE)	2	8	5	15
23	Italy (ITA)	2	7	9	18
24	Saudi Arabia (KSA)	2	4	0	6
25	Switzerland (SUI)	2	3	2	7
26	Finland (FIN)	2	2	2	6
27	Chile (CHI)	2	2	0	4
28	Bulgaria (BUL)	2	1	1	4
28	Mauritius (MRI)	2	1	1	4
30	Bahrain (BHN)	2	0	2	4
31	France (FRA)	1	3	7	11
32	Norway (NOR)	1	2	3	6
33	Ireland (IRL)	1	2	0	3
34	Egypt (EGY)	1	1	2	4
35	New Zealand (NZL)	1	1	0	2
36	Iceland (ISL)	1	0	1	2
37	Belgium (BEL)	0	2	4	6
38	Jamaica (JAM)	0	2	1	3
39	Czech Republic (CZE)	0	1	2	3
40	Hong Kong (HKG)	0	1	0	1
Totals (40 entries)		226	191	155	572

=== 2017 ===
Rank	Nation	Gold	Silver	Bronze	Total
1	United States (USA)	18	8	10	36
2	Iran (IRN)	12	5	5	22
3	Great Britain (GBR)	11	4	5	20
4	Mexico (MEX)	8	7	3	18
5	Colombia (COL)	8	4	2	14
6	Brazil (BRA)	7	6	3	16
7	Japan (JPN)	7	0	2	9
8	Australia (AUS)	5	6	9	20
9	Spain (ESP)	5	5	6	16
10	Germany (GER)	5	5	5	15
11	South Africa (SAF)	4	0	1	5
12	Poland (POL)	3	4	1	8
13	Turkey (TUR)	3	1	1	5
14	Argentina (ARG)	2	5	3	10
15	India (IND)	2	3	0	5
16	Canada (CAN)	2	2	1	5
17	Chile (CHI)	2	2	0	4
18	Austria (AUT)	2	1	2	5
18	Ecuador (ECU)	2	1	2	5
20	Saudi Arabia (KSA)	2	0	0	2
21	Italy (ITA)	1	4	5	10
22	Croatia (CRO)	1	3	0	4
23	Portugal (POR)	1	2	1	4
24	New Zealand (NZL)	1	1	0	2
24	Switzerland (SUI)	1	1	0	2
26	Bulgaria (BUL)	1	0	1	2
26	Norway (NOR)	1	0	1	2
28	United Arab Emirates (UAE)	0	5	2	7
29	Belarus (BLR)	0	3	0	3
30	Belgium (BEL)	0	2	2	4
31	Jamaica (JAM)	0	2	1	3
32	Czech Republic (CZE)	0	1	0	1
32	Hong Kong (HKG)	0	1	0	1
34	France (FRA)	0	0	1	1
34	Iceland (ISL)	0	0	1	1
Totals (35 entries)		117	94	76	287

=== 2019 ===
Rank	Nation	Gold	Silver	Bronze	Total
1	United States (USA)	16	3	9	28
2	India (IND)	11	6	6	23
3	Germany (GER)	8	9	8	25
4	Brazil (BRA)	8	7	4	19
5	South Africa (RSA)	7	10	5	22
6	Mexico (MEX)	7	3	3	13
7	Turkey (TUR)	5	2	1	8
8	Belarus (BLR)	5	1	0	6
9	Great Britain (GBR)	4	9	4	17
10	Spain (ESP)	4	4	7	15
11	Japan (JPN)	4	1	2	7
12	Poland (POL)	3	4	1	8
13	Ecuador (ECU)	3	2	0	5
14	Austria (AUT)	3	1	0	4
15	Croatia (CRO)	2	5	1	8
16	United Arab Emirates (UAE)	2	3	3	8
17	Portugal (POR)	2	3	0	5
18	Finland (FIN)	2	2	2	6
19	Mauritius (MRI)	2	1	1	4
20	Bahrain (BHR)	2	0	2	4
21	France (FRA)	1	3	6	10
22	Italy (ITA)	1	3	4	8
23	Switzerland (SUI)	1	2	2	5
24	Canada (CAN)	1	2	0	3
24	Ireland (IRL)	1	2	0	3
26	Egypt (EGY)	1	1	2	4
27	Argentina (ARG)	1	1	1	3
28	Bulgaria (BUL)	1	1	0	2
29	Iceland (ISL)	1	0	0	1
30	Saudi Arabia (KSA)	0	4	0	4
31	Norway (NOR)	0	2	2	4
32	Colombia (COL)	0	1	1	2
33	Belgium (BEL)	0	0	2	2
33	Czech Republic (CZE)	0	0	2	2
Totals (34 entries)		109	98	81	288

== Classification ==
- F = field athletes
- T = track athletes
- P = pentathlon
- 11-13 – visually impaired, 11 and 12 compete with a sighted guide
- 20 – intellectual disability
- 31-38 – cerebral palsy or other conditions that affect muscle co-ordination and control. Athletes in class 31-34 compete in a seated position; athletes in class 35-38 compete standing.
- 40-46 – amputation, les autre
- 51-58 – wheelchair athletes

== See also ==
- World Para Athletics Championships
- World Para Athletics European Championships
