= East African Athletics Championships =

International athletics competition

- Genre: outdoor track and field
- Frequency: biennial
- Venue: varies
- Participants: East African nations
- Organiser: Confederation of African Athletics

The East African Athletics Championships, also known as the Zone V Championships, was an international athletics competition between East African nations, organised by the Confederation of African Athletics (CAA). It was established in 1995, the same year as two other regional championships: the West and North African Athletics Championships and the African Southern Region Athletics Championships. The competition succeeded the East and Central African Championships as the premier regional athletics competition for the region. All the events at the championships were in outdoor track and field.

== Editions ==
Edition	Year	City	Country	Date	Nations	Athletes
1	1995	Nairobi	Kenya			
2	2001	Zanzibar City	Tanzania			
3	2003	Zanzibar City	Tanzania			
4	2005	Addis Ababa	Ethiopia			
5	2021	Kampala	Uganda			

== Events ==
The competition programme featured 32 regular athletics events: seven track running events, two obstacle events, three jumps, and four throws for both the sexes.

Track running

- 100 metres, 200 metres, 400 metres, 800 metres, 1500 metres, 5000 metres, 10,000 metres

Obstacle events

- 100 metres hurdles (women only), 110 metres hurdles (men only), 400 metres hurdles, 3000 metres steeplechase (men only)

Jumping events

- High jump, long jump, triple jump

Throwing events

- Shot put, discus throw, javelin throw, hammer throw (men only)

Relay events

- 4 × 100 metres relay, 4 × 400 metres relay

Several events were held irregularly. Women did not compete in the steeplechase or hammer throw, and pole vault was not available as an event for either sex.

== Participation ==
- Ethiopia
- Egypt
- Kenya
- Sudan
- Tanzania
- Uganda

== Champions ==
=== Men's 100 metres ===
- 1995: Donald Onchiri (KEN)
- 2001: Francis Saire (TAN)
- 2003: Makame Ally (TAN)
- 2005: Wetere Gelelcha (ETH)

=== Men's 200 metres ===
- 1995: Joseph Gikonyo (KEN)
- 2001: ?
- 2003: Makame Ally (TAN)
- 2005: ?

=== Men's 400 metres ===
- 1995: Davis Kamoga (UGA)
- 2001: Frank Martin (TAN)
- 2003: Thomas Musembi (KEN)
- 2005: Adam Mohamed Al-Nour (SUD)

=== Men's 800 metres ===
- 1995: Robert Chirchir (KEN)
- 2001: ?
- 2003: Samwel Mwera (TAN)
- 2005: ?

=== Men's 1500 metres ===
- 1995: Stephen Kipkorir (KEN)
- 2001: Markos Geneti (ETH)
- 2003: Samwel Mwera (TAN)
- 2005: ?

=== Men's 5000 metres ===
- 1995: Evans Otieno (KEN)
- 2001: James Kwalia (KEN)
- 2003: Martin Sulle (TAN)
- 2005: ?

=== Men's 10,000 metres ===
- 1995: William Kipchumba (KEN)
- 2001: John Yuda Msuri (TAN)
- 2003: Martin Sulle (TAN)
- 2005: Ketema Negussie (ETH)

=== Men's 3000 metres steeplechase ===
- 1995: Paul Malakwen Kosgei (KEN)
- 2001: ?
- 2003: Not held
- 2005: ?

=== Men's 110 metres hurdles ===
- 1995: James Tarus (KEN)
- 2001: ?
- 2003: Not held
- 2005: ?

=== Men's 400 metres hurdles ===
- 1995: Gideon Biwott (KEN)
- 2001: ?
- 2003: Not held
- 2005: Abdulagadir Idriss (SUD)

=== Men's high jump ===
- 1995: Simon Ruto (KEN)
- 2001: ?
- 2003: Nazar El Nazir (SUD)
- 2005: ?

=== Men's long jump ===
- 1995: Jacob Katonon (KEN)
- 2001: Muhidin Yasini (TAN)
- 2003: Paul Koech (KEN)
- 2005: ?

=== Men's triple jump ===
- 1995: Jacob Katonon (KEN)
- 2001: ?
- 2003: Not held
- 2005: ?

=== Men's shot put ===
- 1995: Gideon Mengich (KEN)
- 2001: Khamis Juma (TAN)
- 2003: Khamis Juma (TAN)
- 2005: ?

=== Men's discus throw ===
- 1995: Paul Kimeli Tanui (KEN)
- 2001: Khamis Juma (TAN)
- 2003: Not held
- 2005: ?

=== Men's hammer throw ===
- 1995: Morris Omoro (KEN)
- 2001: ?
- 2003: Not held
- 2005: ?

=== Men's javelin throw ===
- 1995: Paul Cheruiyot Kiprop (KEN)
- 2001: James Obua (UGA)
- 2003: Yasser Mohamed Ali Hassan (SUD)
- 2005: ?

=== Men's 4 × 100 metres relay ===
- 1995: Kenya (KEN)
- 2001: ?
- 2003: Tanzania (TAN)
- 2005: ?

=== Men's 4 × 400 metres relay ===
- 1995: Kenya (KEN)
- 2001: Tanzania (TAN)
- 2003: Tanzania (TAN)
- 2005: ?

=== Women's 100 metres ===
- 1995: Teddy Kunihira (UGA)
- 2001: ?
- 2003: Hellen Chemtai (KEN)
- 2005: ?

=== Women's 200 metres ===
- 1995: Mary Awora (UGA)
- 2001: Lwiza John (TAN)
- 2003: Hellen Chemtai (KEN)
- 2005: ?

=== Women's 400 metres ===
- 1995: Grace Birungi (UGA)
- 2001: ?
- 2003: Netsanet Getu (ETH)
- 2005: Nawal El Jack (SUD)

=== Women's 800 metres ===
- 1995: Kutre Dulecha (ETH)
- 2001: Lwiza John (TAN)
- 2003: Lwiza John (TAN)
- 2005: Lense Kumsu (ETH)

=== Women's 1500 metres ===
- 1995: Naomi Mugo (KEN)
- 2001: ?
- 2003: Pendo Japhet (TAN)
- 2005: ?

=== Women's 5000 metres ===
- 1995: Luchia Yishak (ETH)
- 2001: Restituta Joseph (TAN)
- 2003: Restituta Joseph (TAN)
- 2005: Adanech Zekiros (ETH)

=== Women's 10,000 metres ===
- 1995: Susan Chepkemei (KEN)
- 2001: ?
- 2003: Not held
- 2005: ?

=== Women's 110 metres hurdles ===
- 1995: Caroline Kola (KEN)
- 2001: ?
- 2003: Not held
- 2005: ?

=== Women's 400 metres hurdles ===
- 1995: Sarah Imbayi (KEN)
- 2001: ?
- 2003: Not held
- 2005: Nawal El Jack (SUD)

=== Women's high jump ===
- 1995: Elima Toroitich (KEN)
- 2001: ?
- 2003: Not held
- 2005: ?

=== Women's long jump ===
- 1995: Eunice Basweti (KEN)
- 2001: ?
- 2003: Not held
- 2005: ?

=== Women's triple jump ===
- 1995: Eunice Basweti (KEN)
- 2001: ?
- 2003: Not held
- 2005: ?

=== Women's shot put ===
- 1995: Joyce Kiume (KEN)
- 2001: Agnes Shoo (TAN)
- 2003: Caroline Kola (KEN)
- 2005: ?

=== Women's discus throw ===
- 1995: Magrine Maiyo (KEN)
- 2001: Siti Haiji (TAN)
- 2003: Not held
- 2005: ?

=== Women's javelin throw ===
- 1995: Matilda Kisava (TAN)
- 2001: ?
- 2003: Not held
- 2005: ?

=== Women's 4 × 100 metres relay ===
- 1995: Uganda (UGA)
- 2001: Tanzania (TAN)
- 2003: Kenya (KEN)
- 2005: ?

=== Women's 4 × 400 metres relay ===
- 1995: Uganda (UGA)
- 2001: ?
- 2003: Tanzania (TAN)
- 2005: Sudan (SUD)
