= East African Half Marathon Championships =

East African Cross Country Championships
- Status: Defunct
- Genre: half marathon
- Frequency: annual
- Venue: varies
- Location: East Africa
- Years active: 2000–2006
- Inaugurated: 2000
- Most recent: 2006
- Participants: East African nations
- Organiser: Confederation of African Athletics

The East African Half Marathon Championships was an international half marathon competition among athletes from East Africa. The competition was the first dedicated road running championship. The event was contiguous with other regional competitions in the sport of athletics, including the East African Athletics Championships (first held 1995) and the East African Cross Country Championships (first held 1999). An East African Marathon Championships was also briefly held during this period, having only one outing in 2002 (won by Tesfit Berhe).

The inaugural edition was staged in Djibouti and featured an individual men's race only. Three further editions were subsequently held, in 2003, 2005 and finally 2006. The last edition included a women's race for the first time. The competition was not held thereafter.

== Editions ==
Edition	Year	Location	Country	Men's winner	Time	Women's winner	Time
1st	2000	?	Djibouti	Simon Peter (TAN)	1:04:34	—N/a	—N/a
2nd	2003	Massawa	Eritrea	Zersenay Tadese (ERI)	1:05:32	—N/a	—N/a
3rd	2005	Khartoum	Sudan	Mohamed Ahmed (SUD)	1:07:30	—N/a	—N/a
4th	2006	Nairobi	Kenya	Jacob Yator (KEN)	1:03:56A	Hellen Cherono (KEN)	1:15:07A
