= 1998 World Masters Non-Stadia Athletics Championships =

- Host city: Kobe, Japan
- Level: Masters
- Type: Non-Stadia
- Participation: 16993 athletes from 16 nations

The fourth World Masters Non-Stadia Athletics Championships were held in Kobe, Japan. The World Masters Athletics Championships serve the division of the sport of athletics for people over 35 years of age, referred to as masters athletics.
