= Jānis Daliņš Stadium =

Stadium in Valmiera, Latvia

- Jāņa Daliņa stadions
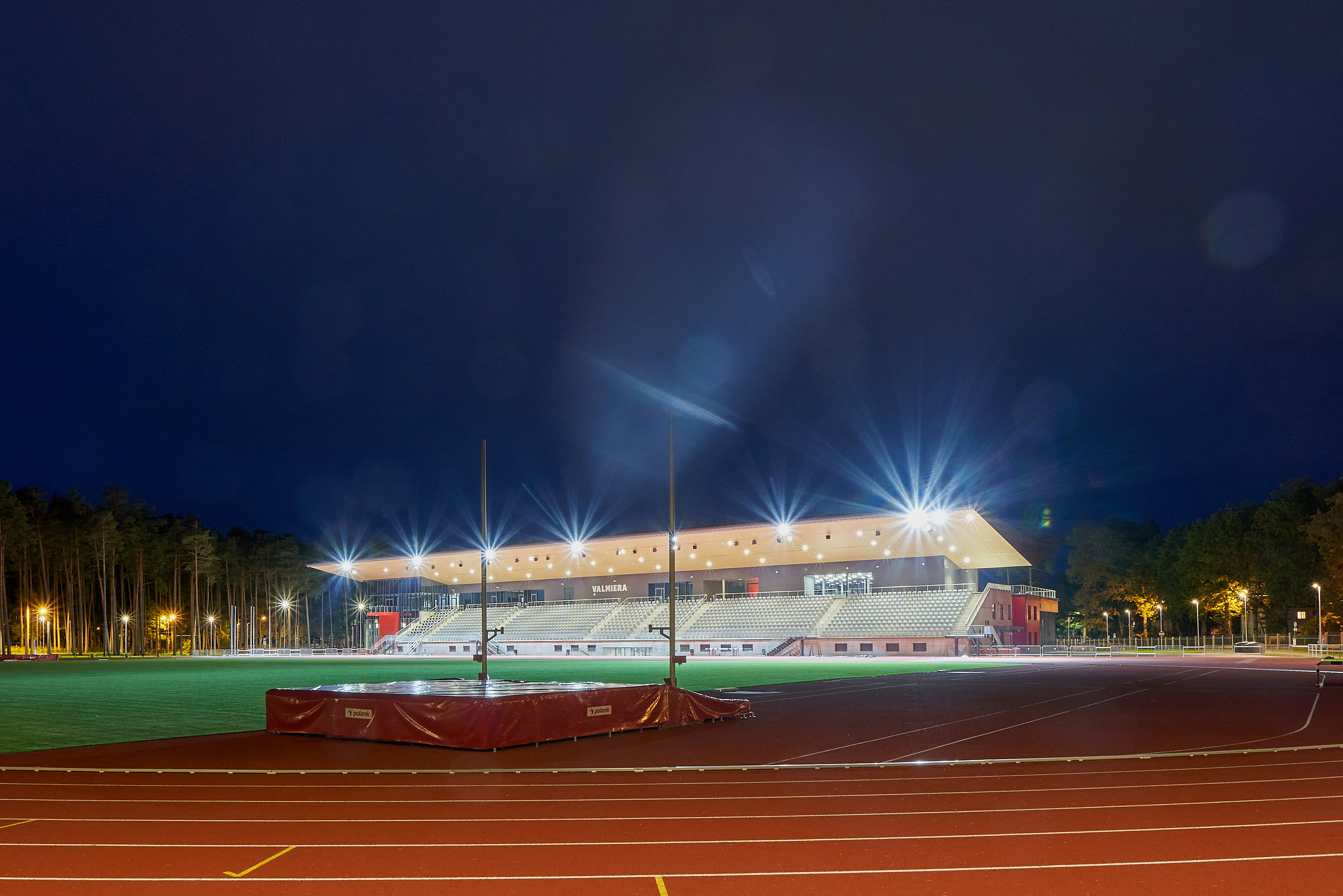
- Jānis Daliņš Stadium in 2021
- Interactive map of Jānis Daliņš Stadium
- Location: Valmiera, Latvia
- Coordinates: 57°32′28″N 25°26′26″E
- Owner: Valmieras Olimpiskais centrs
- Capacity: 1,250

The Jānis Daliņš Stadium (Latvian: Jāņa Daliņa stadions) is a multi-purpose stadium owned by Valmiera Olimpiskais centrs in Valmiera, Latvia. The stadium has a capacity of 1,250.

The stadium was named in honour of the Latvian race walker Jānis Daliņš.

== Facilities ==
The stadium has three sports fields, including two basketball courts and a universal field for volleyball and mini-football, along with an eight-runway lap. Gym equipment is provided and there is a playground for kids.
