= 1996 World Masters Non-Stadia Athletics Championships =

- Host city: Bruges, Belgium
- Level: Masters
- Type: Non-Stadia
- Participation: 3321 athletes from 42 nations

The third World Masters Non-Stadia Athletics Championships were held in Bruges, Belgium. The World Masters Athletics Championships serve the division of the sport of athletics for people over 35 years of age, referred to as masters athletics.
