= 2004 World Masters Non-Stadia Athletics Championships =

- Dates: 18-24 April
- Host city: Manukau, Auckland and Rotorua, New Zealand
- Level: Masters
- Type: Non-Stadia
- Participation: 735 athletes from 22 nations

The seventh World Masters Non-Stadia Athletics Championships were held in Manukau, Auckland and Rotorua, New Zealand, from April 18-24, 2004. The World Masters Athletics Championships serve the division of the sport of athletics for people over 35 years of age, referred to as masters athletics.
