= Athletics at the Afro-Asian Games =

Athletics was a sport at the inaugural Afro-Asian Games in 2003 in Hyderabad, India. The second Games were planned for 2007 but they have been indefinitely postponed.

== Editions ==
Games	Year	Host	Events	
Games	Year	Host	Men	Women
I	2003	Hyderabad	21	20
II	?	Algiers	?	?
