= Tallinn Athletics Hall =

Sports hall in Tallinn

Coordinates: 59.427222°N 24.760555°E

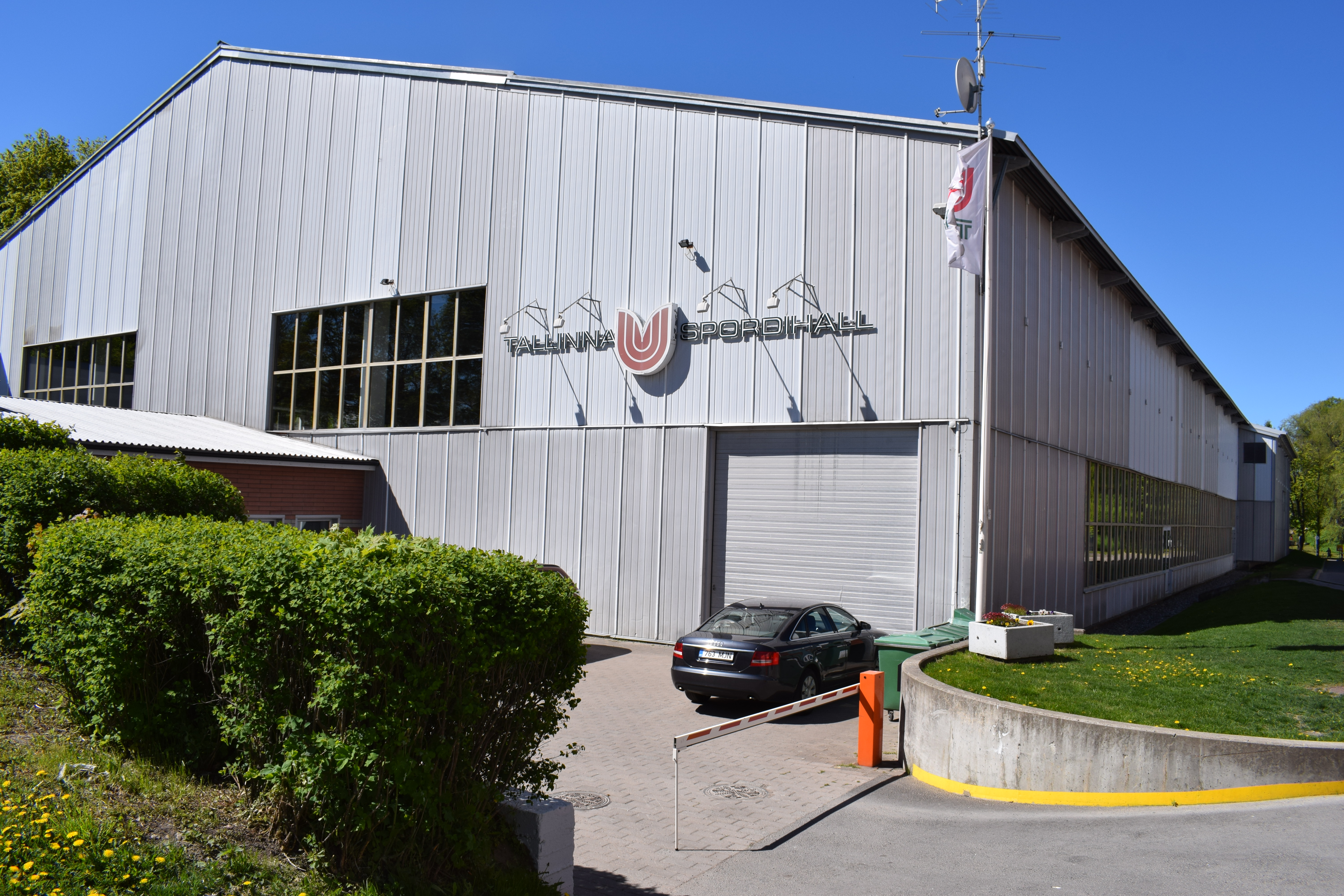
Tallinn Sports Hall (May 2017)

Tallinn Sports Hall (Estonian: Tallinna spordihall) is a sport hall in Tallinn, Estonia.

The hall was opened on 11 February 1996 and at that time, it was the most modern athletics facility in the Baltics, with a 200-metre running lane, several tennis courts, basketball hall, and a fitness studio.
