= 1994 World Masters Non-Stadia Athletics Championships =

- Dates: 30-31 July
- Host city: Scarborough, Canada
- Level: Masters
- Type: Non-Stadia
- Participation: 515 athletes from 27 nations

The second World Masters Non-Stadia Athletics Championships were held in Scarborough, Canada, from July 30-31, 1994. The World Masters Athletics Championships serve the division of the sport of athletics for people over 35 years of age, referred to as masters athletics.
