= 2002 World Masters Non-Stadia Athletics Championships =

- Dates: 24-26 May
- Host city: Riccione, Italy
- Level: Masters
- Type: Non-Stadia
- Participation: 2230 athletes

The sixth World Masters Non-Stadia Athletics Championships were held in Riccione, Italy, from May 24-26, 2002. The World Masters Athletics Championships serve the division of the sport of athletics for people over 35 years of age, referred to as masters athletics.
