= Iain Harnden =

Zimbabwean hurdler

Iain Harnden (born 23 September 1976) is a retired male hurdler from Zimbabwe. He represented his native African country at the 2000 Summer Olympics in Sydney, Australia and the 2001 World Championships in Edmonton, Alberta, Canada.
