= Julius Masvanise =

Zimbabwean athlete

Julius Masvanise (born February 7, 1966) is a retired male track and field athlete from Zimbabwe, who competed for his native African country at the 1996 Summer Olympics in Atlanta, Georgia. Masvanise was a hurdler and a sprinter.
