= European Masters Athletics Championships Non-Stadia =

The European Masters Athletics Championships Non-Stadia is a biennial international athletics competition for masters athletes aged 35 and over, organised by European Masters Athletics. Formerly known as the European Veterans Non-Stadia Championships, it was first held in 1989. It typically takes place over two or three days in April or May.

The competition provides European championship competitions for masters athletes in non-track and field athletics events. This includes road running events in the 10K run and half marathon, relay cross country running events, and racewalking events in the 10 kilometres race walk, 20 kilometres race walk (women only), and 30 kilometres race walk (men only). Men's and women's marathon championships were contested in 1989 and men's and women's 25K run events were held in 1991.

== Editions ==
Edition	Year	Dates	City	Country
1	1989	24–25 June	Bruges	Belgium
2	1991	5–6 October	Dolo, Mira	Italy
3	1993	29–30 May	Úpice	Czech Republic
4	1995	13–14 May	Valladolid	Spain
5	1997	31 May–1 June	The Hague	Netherlands
6	1999	26–27 June	Bruges	Belgium
7	2001	28–29 April	Qormi	Malta
8	2003	24–25 May	Úpice	Czech Republic
9	2005	13–15 May	Vila Real de Santo António	Portugal
10	2007	17–20 May	Regensburg	Germany
11	2009	29–31 May	Aarhus	Denmark
12	2011	13–15 May	Thionville, Yutz	France
13	2013	23–26 May	Úpice	Czech Republic
14	2015	15–17 May	Grosseto	Italy
15	2016	20–22 May	Vila Real de Santo António	Portugal
16	2018	18–20 May	Alicante	Spain
17	2020	2–4 April	Funchal	Portugal
18	2022	13–15 May	Grosseto	Italy
19	2024	16–19 May	Porto Santo	Portugal
