= West African Cross Country Championships =

Cross country running competition

The West African Cross Country Championships was an international cross country running competition between West African nations. It was staged on one occasion in 1996 in Bamako, Mali. It featured a men's race and a women's race, both of which had individual and team components. Souley Oumarou of Niger won the men's race in a time of 31:41 minutes, helping his national team to the men's title with six points. In the women's race, Ama Amého of Togo took the individual gold medal with a run of 19:45 minutes, while the women's team title was won by Burkina Faso on ten points.
