= Sharon Tavengwa =

Zimbabwean long-distance runner (born 1983)

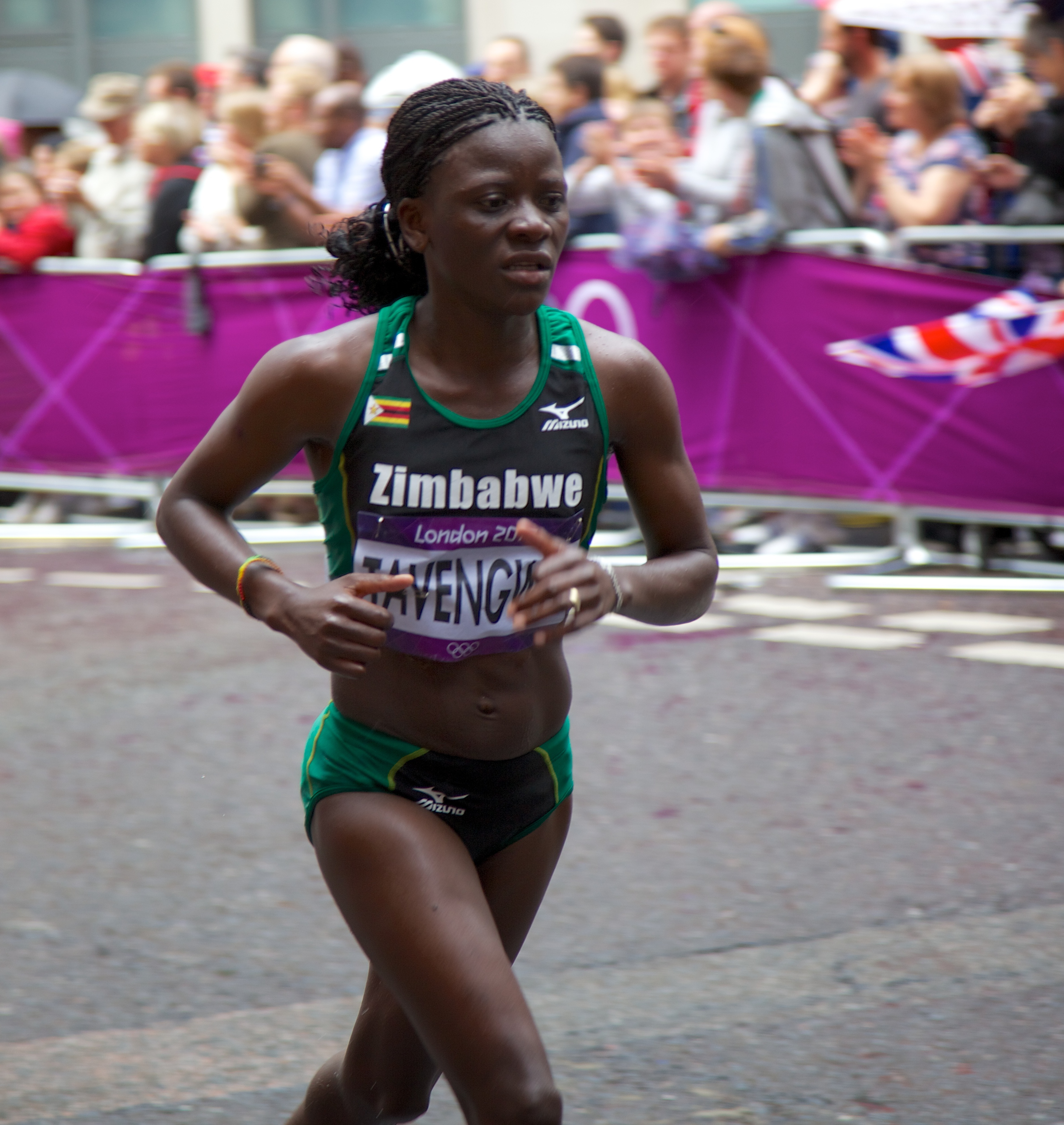

Personal information
- Born: 9 December 1983 (age 42)
- Height: 1.57 m (5 ft 2 in)
- Weight: 47 kg (104 lb)

Sport
- Country: Zimbabwe
- Sport: Athletics
- Event: Marathon

Sharon Tavengwa (born 9 December 1983 in Chirumanzu) is a Zimbabwean long-distance runner. She competed in the marathon at the 2012 Summer Olympics but did not finish the race.
