= European Masters Mountain Running Championships =

International competition

The European Masters Mountain Running Championships is a biennial one-day international competition in mountain running for masters athletes aged 35 and over, organised by European Masters Athletics. First held in 2006, the competition began to be held in odd-numbered years. It is usually held in the middle of the year. The competition incorporated trail running for the first time in 2020, as the European Masters Mountain and Trail Running Championships. The Masters Mountain and Trail Running Championships were held again in 2021, and in 2022 they were held again under the new name European Masters Off-Road Running Championships.

== Editions ==
Edition	Year	Location	Country	Date	No. of athletes
1st	2006	Zell am Harmersbach	Germany	15 July	
2nd	2008	Lenzerheide	Switzerland	28 June	
3rd	2010	Cerdanyola del Vallès	Spain	16 May	
4th	2012	Bludenz	Austria	1 July	
5th	2014	Ludwikowice Kłodzkie	Poland	14 June	
6th	2017	Montcada i Reixac	Spain	30 April	
7th	2019	Janské Lázně	Czech Republic	25 May	
8th	2020	Funchal	Portugal	27–29 March	
