= North African Athletics Championships =

International athletics competition

The North African Athletics Championships was an international athletics competition between countries in North Africa. The event was hosted only twice, in 2003 and 2004, and was also known as the African Zone I Championships. It was the main track and field contest for the region, and during the same period North African championships in cross country, half marathon and combined events and racewalking were also held. The development of intra-regional competition in North Africa was hampered by political disputes between Algeria and Morocco, particularly over sovereignty of the Western Sahara.

The 2003 championships featured teams from Algeria, Libya, Morocco, Tunisia competing in 40 track and field events. The 2004 programme was much reduced, at 23 events, and Morocco was absent.

The championships followed on from the Maghreb Athletics Championships, which featured the same four countries ) but was abandoned after 1990, as well as a one-off West and North African Athletics Championships in 1995.

== Editions ==
Ed.	Year	City	Country	Dates	No. of events	No. of nations
1st	2003	Tunis/Radès	Tunisia		40	4
2nd	2004	Algiers	Algeria		23	3

== Participating nations ==
- Algeria
- Morocco (except 2004)
- Tunisia
- Libya
