= List of jumping activities =

The action of jumping is central to several sports and activities. Some sports are based almost exclusively on the ability to jump, such as high jump in track and field, whereas in other sports the act of jumping is one of multiple athletic abilities used in the sport, such as basketball.

== Track and field ==
- High jump, in which athletes jump over horizontal bars.
- Long jump, where the objective is to leap horizontally as far as possible.
- Pole vault, in which a person uses a long, flexible pole as an aid to jump over a bar.
- Triple jump, the objective is to leap horizontally as far as possible, in a series of three jumps

== Sports ==
- American football
- Association football ("soccer" in U.S. and Canada)
- Australian Rules football
- Badminton
- Basketball
- Bossaball
- Cheerleading
- Dancing
- Diving - Jumping into water
- Figure skating - Artistic/sporting ice skating
- Gymnastics
- Jump rope
- Martial arts
- Netball - Similar to basketball
- Parkour - Urban jumping and climbing
- Racquetball
- Rugby
- Skateboarding
- Skiing
- Ski jumping
- Squash
- Swimming
- Table tennis
- Team Handball
- Tennis
- Trampolining
- Ultimate - Frisbee competition
- Volleyball
- Jumping Jack - A calisthenic exercise

== Animal sports ==
Early motion picture of a horse jumping

- Dog agility, in which a dog traverses various obstacles, including jumps.
- Show jumping and Eventing, competitions where a horse jumps over fences.
- Rabbit show jumping
- Fox hunting, in which horses and fox hounds jump over fences and other obstacles.
