= World Deaf Athletics Championships =

- Status: active
- Genre: sports event
- Date: midyear
- Frequency: 4 Years
- Inaugurated: 2008
- Organiser: CISS

The World Deaf Athletics Championships is a quadrennial global competitions in the sport of athletics for deaf people. It is organised by the International Committee of Sports for the Deaf and was first held in 2008.

== Introduction ==
The World Deaf Athletics Championships, first held in 2008, are quadrennial global competitions organized by the International Committee of Sports for the Deaf (ICSD). These championships provide a platform for deaf athletes to compete in various athletic events, promoting inclusivity and excellence in sports.

One of the unique aspects of the World Deaf Athletics Championships is the use of visual signals instead of auditory cues, ensuring that all athletes can compete fairly regardless of their hearing ability. This adaptation highlights the commitment to creating an equitable environment for all participants.

Since their inception, the championships have grown significantly, with increasing numbers of athletes and countries participating. This growth reflects the broader recognition and support for deaf athletes and their contributions to the global sports community

== Editions ==
=== Outdoor ===
Edition	Year	Host	Venue	Dates	Events	Athletes	Teams	Ref
1	2008	(Turkey) İzmir	İzmir Atatürk Stadium	22–29 September		318	32	
2	2012	(Canada) Toronto	Varsity Stadium	14–21 July		241	27	
3	2016	(Bulgaria) Stara Zagora	Beroe Stadium	25 June – 3 July		262	38	
4	2021	(Poland) Lublin	Lublin Athletics Stadium	23 – 28 August	47	330	41	
5	2024	(Taiwan) Taipei		18–23 July	34	240	40	

=== Indoor ===
Edition	Year	Host	Venue	Dates	Events	Athletes	Teams	Ref
1	2019	(Estonia) Tallinn	Lasnamäe Kergejõustikuhall	14–19 March				
2	2023	(Poland) Toruń						

=== Junior ===
1st - Chinese Taipei 2024

=== 2024 Results ===
https://web.archive.org/web/20240818054855/http://163.17.55.68/wdyac2024/score_query_adv.php?ItNo=21&ItNa=%A5%D0%AE%7C - 2024 Youth Results

https://web.archive.org/web/20240818054900/http://210.59.162.39/wdac2024/score_query_adv.php?ItNo=21&ItNa=%A5%D0%AE%7C - 2024 Senior Results

http://www.ciss.org/events/402

http://www.ciss.org/championships/taipei-2024

https://www.tokyoforward2025.metro.tokyo.lg.jp/en/

Events:

Youth: 9 Men + 4 Women = 13

Senior: 13 Men + 9 Women + 1 Mixed = 23

== Asia-Pacific ==
Asia-Pacific Deaf Athletics Championships

1. 2023 - Iran

== Europe ==
European Deaf Athletics Championships

Results:

https://www.edso.eu/2013/10/19/overview-european-championships/

https://www.edso.eu/2013/10/19/overview-junior-european-championships/

Athletics – Overview European Championships

Place Country Date Year

1st Salerno Italy 02 - 05 October 1980

2nd München Germany 29 July - 01 August 1987

3rd Vladimir Russia 02 - 06 July 1991

4th Lausanne Switzerland 27 June - 01 July 1995

5th Piraeus Greece 05 - 10 July 1999

6th Tallinn Estonia 13 - 19 July 2003

7th Sofia Bulgaria 08 - 14 July 2007

8th Kayseri Turkey 10 - 16 July 2011

== See also ==
- European Deaf Athletics Championships
- Asian Deaf Athletics Championships Since 2023

== Notes ==
The 2021 World Deaf Athletics Championships was originally scheduled from 18 to 25 July 2020 and was going to be held in Radom, but was postponed due to the COVID-19 pandemic and moved to Lublin.

== Related Games ==
- https://winterdeaflympics2023.com/schedule-separately/
- https://www.deaflympics.com/events/438
- https://www.deaflympics.com/pdf/bulletin-1-world-deaf-youth-games.pdf - 1st World Deaf Youth Games
- http://www.ciss.org/world-deaf-youth-games-in-2024
- http://www.ciss.org/events/402
- http://www.ciss.org/championships/taipei-2024
