= West and North African Athletics Championships =

International athletics competition

West and North African Championships
- Host stadium in Dakar
- Host city: Dakar, Senegal
- Venue: Stade Léopold Senghor
- Events: 26

The West and North African Athletics Championships was an international athletics competition between West and North African nations. It was held on one occasion in 1995 at the Stade Léopold Sédar Senghor in Dakar, Senegal. A reduced programme was held, focusing on the strengths of the regions' athletes. A total of 26 track and field events were contested, 16 for men and 11 for women. The men's 5000 metres, won by future world record holder Khalid Khannouchi, was the only long-distance event on the programme. The only throws on offer were shot put for men and women and a men's javelin throw. The host nation won the most events, with eight gold medals, followed by Nigeria and Morocco which won five events each. Burkina Faso and Cameroon were the only other nations to win an event. Ivorian sprinter Louise Ayétotché was the only athlete to win multiple events, taking the women's 200 metres and 400 metres titles.

The event was also known as the West African Games.

== Medal summary ==
=== Men ===
Event	Gold		Silver	Bronze
100 metres	Franck Waota (CIV)	10.35		
200 metres	Nnamdi Anusim (NGR)	21.43†		
400 metres	Ibrahima Wade (SEN)	47.04		
800 metres	Assane Diallo (SEN)	1:54.52		
1500 metres	Mohamed Ramdi (MAR)	3:49.03		
5000 metres	Khalid Khannouchi (MAR)	14:03.58		
110 m hurdles	Mustapha Sdad (MAR)	14.38		
400 m hurdles	Hamidou M'Baye (SEN)	51.40		
4 × 100 m relay	Ivory Coast (CIV)	40.40		
4 × 400 m relay	Senegal (SEN)	3:16.39		
High jump	Olivier Sanou (BUR)	2.13 m		
Long jump	Cheikh Touré (SEN)	8.01 m		
Triple jump	Médoune Diop (SEN)	15.39 m		
Shot put	Khalid Fatihi (MAR)	16.98 m		
Javelin throw	Pius Bazighe (NGR)	72.50 m		

- † The men's 200 m was won by Antoine Boussombo, a guest athletes from Gabon, in a time of 21.39 seconds.

=== Women ===
Event	Gold		Silver	Bronze
100 metres	Georgette Nkoma (CMR)	11.64		
200 metres	Louise Ayétotché (CIV)	24.20		
400 metres	Louise Ayétotché (CIV)	24.20		
800 metres	Zahra Ouaziz (MAR)	4:19.64		
100 m hurdles	Mosun Adesina (NGR)	13.88		
4 × 100 m relay	Senegal (SEN)	47.17		
4 × 400 m relay	Senegal (SEN)	3:52.12		
High jump	Irène Tiendrébéogo (BUR)	1.79 m		
Long jump	Chinedu Odozor (NGR)	6.24 m		
Triple jump	Tina Osoro (NGR)	12.55 m		
Shot put	Fouzia Fatihi (MAR)	14.99 m		
