= 2010 World Junior Championships in Athletics – Men's 110 metres hurdles =

The men's 110 metres hurdles event at the 2010 World Junior Championships in Athletics was held in Moncton, New Brunswick, Canada, at Moncton Stadium on 23, 24 and 25 July. 99.0 cm (3'3) (junior implement) hurdles were used.

== Medalists ==
Gold	Pascal Martinot-Lagarde; France
Silver	Vladimir Vukicevic; Norway
Bronze	Jack Meredith; United Kingdom

== Results ==
=== Final ===
25 July
Wind: -2.4 m/s

Rank	Name	Nationality	Time	Notes
1st place, gold medalist(s)	Pascal Martinot-Lagarde	France	13.52	
2nd place, silver medalist(s)	Vladimir Vukicevic	Norway	13.59	
3rd place, bronze medalist(s)	Jack Meredith	United Kingdom	13.59	
4	Sam Baines	Australia	13.62	
5	Caleb Cross	United States	13.86	
6	Mitchell Tysoe	Australia	13.87	
7	Wataru Yazawa	Japan	13.88	
8	Greggmar Swift	Barbados	13.93	

=== Semifinals ===
24 July

==== Semifinal 1 ====
Wind: +0.4 m/s

Rank	Name	Nationality	Time	Notes
1	Wataru Yazawa	Japan	13.57	Q
2	Caleb Cross	United States	13.72	Q
3	Mitchell Tysoe	Australia	13.77	q
4	Jean da Silva	Brazil	13.91	
5	Gregor Traber	Germany	13.92	
6	Dario Vanderveken	Belgium	13.94	
7	Segun Makinde	Canada	14.05	
	Kamal Fuller	Jamaica	DNF	

==== Semifinal 2 ====
Wind: -1.1 m/s

Rank	Name	Nationality	Time	Notes
1	Greggmar Swift	Barbados	13.65	Q
2	Pascal Martinot-Lagarde	France	13.73	Q
3	João de Oliveira	Brazil	13.79	
4	Johnathan Cabral	United States	13.80	
5	Julian Marquart	Germany	13.99	
6	Stefan Fennell	Jamaica	14.19	
7	Charis Koutras	Cyprus	14.21	
8	Batuhan Eruygun	Turkey	14.41	

==== Semifinal 3 ====
Wind: -0.9 m/s

Rank	Name	Nationality	Time	Notes
1	Jack Meredith	United Kingdom	13.52	Q
2	Sam Baines	Australia	13.66	Q
3	Vladimir Vukicevic	Norway	13.67	q
4	Liu Yu	China	14.12	
5	Dries Peeters	Belgium	14.27	
6	Arnau Erta	Spain	14.27	
7	Thomas Delmestre	France	14.28	
8	Kobus Moolman	South Africa	14.30	

=== Heats ===
23 July

==== Heat 1 ====
Wind: -2.2 m/s

Rank	Name	Nationality	Time	Notes
1	Sam Baines	Australia	13.88	Q
2	Julian Marquart	Germany	14.03	Q
3	Liu Yu	China	14.06	Q
4	Siddhanth Thingalaya	India	14.09	
5	Javier McFarlane	Peru	14.10	
6	Ramy Said	Egypt	14.36	
7	Robin Pál	Hungary	14.68	

==== Heat 2 ====
Wind: -0.8 m/s

Rank	Name	Nationality	Time	Notes
1	Mitchell Tysoe	Australia	13.72	Q
2	Thomas Delmestre	France	14.10	Q
3	Batuhan Eruygun	Turkey	14.30	Q
4	Mauricio Pereira	Paraguay	14.85	
5	Jonathan Santiago	Puerto Rico	14.86	
	Orlando Ortega	Cuba	DNF	

==== Heat 3 ====
Wind: +0.1 m/s

Rank	Name	Nationality	Time	Notes
1	Jack Meredith	United Kingdom	13.77	Q
2	João de Oliveira	Brazil	13.87	Q
3	Kamal Fuller	Jamaica	14.08	Q
4	Filip Lööv	Sweden	14.21	
5	Lukáš Haloun	Czech Republic	14.50	
6	Jaakko Malmivirta	Finland	14.69	
7	Saif Sabbah Khalifa	Qatar	14.88	

==== Heat 4 ====
Wind: +1.0 m/s

Rank	Name	Nationality	Time	Notes
1	Caleb Cross	United States	13.56	Q
2	Greggmar Swift	Barbados	13.68	Q
3	Jean da Silva	Brazil	13.87	Q
4	Segun Makinde	Canada	13.98	q
5	Arnau Erta	Spain	14.02	q
6	Cheng Yun-Yin	Chinese Taipei	14.30	
7	Michael Herreros	Guam	16.92	

==== Heat 5 ====
Wind: -0.5 m/s

Rank	Name	Nationality	Time	Notes
1	Johnathan Cabral	United States	13.63	Q
2	Wataru Yazawa	Japan	13.76	Q
3	Gregor Traber	Germany	13.87	Q
4	Charis Koutras	Cyprus	14.01	q
5	Pasi Roslund	Finland	14.16	
6	Lee Yen-Lin	Chinese Taipei	14.29	
7	Aaron Wilmore	Bahamas	14.35	

==== Heat 6 ====
Wind: +1.6 m/s

Rank	Name	Nationality	Time	Notes
1	Pascal Martinot-Lagarde	France	13.53	Q
2	Kobus Moolman	South Africa	14.00	Q
3	Dries Peeters	Belgium	14.01	Q
4	Claudio Delli Carpini	Italy	14.12	
5	Tremaine Grant	Canada	14.16	
6	Cornel Bananau	Romania	14.22	
	Christian Nielsen	Denmark	DNF	

==== Heat 7 ====
Wind: +1.3 m/s

Rank	Name	Nationality	Time	Notes
1	Vladimir Vukicevic	Norway	13.49	Q
2	Dario Vanderveken	Belgium	13.80	Q
3	Stefan Fennell	Jamaica	13.95	Q
4	Werner Pretorius	South Africa	14.17	
5	Michael Cochrane	New Zealand	14.28	
6	Ernesto Prados	Spain	14.29	
7	Nader Al-Haydar	Saudi Arabia	14.73	

== Participation ==
According to an unofficial count, 48 athletes from 36 countries participated in the event.

- Australia (2)
- Bahamas (1)
- Barbados (1)
- Belgium (2)
- Brazil (2)
- Canada (2)
- China (1)
- Chinese Taipei (2)
- Cuba (1)
- Cyprus (1)
- Czech Republic (1)
- Denmark (1)
- Egypt (1)
- Finland (2)
- France (2)
- Germany (2)
- Guam (1)
- Hungary (1)
- India (1)
- Italy (1)
- Jamaica (2)
- Japan (1)
- New Zealand (1)
- Norway (1)
- Paraguay (1)
- Peru (1)
- Puerto Rico (1)
- Qatar (1)
- Romania (1)
- Saudi Arabia (1)
- South Africa (2)
- Spain (2)
- Sweden (1)
- Turkey (1)
- United Kingdom (1)
- United States (2)
