= 2018 IAAF World Indoor Championships – Women's shot put =

Women's shot put at the 2018 IAAF World Indoor Championships
- Venue: Arena Birmingham
- Dates: 2 March
- Competitors: 15 from 12 nations
- Winning distance: 19.62

Medalists
gold medal	Anita Márton	Hungary
silver medal	Danniel Thomas-Dodd	Jamaica
bronze medal	Gong Lijiao	China

The women's shot put at the 2018 IAAF World Indoor Championships took place on 2 March 2018.

== Summary ==
No qualifying round was needed, so all entrants were finalists. In the first round Danniel Thomas-Dodd took the lead with an 18.92m. Paulina Guba and Gao Yang held the next two positions. Thomas-Dodd improved slightly in the second round but was displaced by the next thrower, Gong Lijiao with an 18.98m. Gao also improved with her best of the day 18.77m. In a vulnerable fifth position after two rounds, Anita Márton saw no challenge to remaining in the competition, then let loose a 19.48m to leapfrog into the lead. Thomas-Dodd wasn't able to answer that, but as the next to step into the ring, she did throw her best of the day 19.22m, good enough to improve her own Jamaican national record and her hold on silver. In the final round, Gong threw a 19.08m to solidify her bronze medal position, almost matched by Thomas-Dodd's final effort of 19.07m, but with gold in hand and the pressure off again, Márton threw a new Hungarian national record 19.62 m (64 ft 4 1/4 in) to cap off her day.

Márton's gold medal was the first for Hungary in the World Championships. Thomas-Dodd's was the first medal for a Jamaican woman in the shot put.

== Results ==
The final was started at 20:09.

Rank	Athlete	Nationality	#1	#2	#3	#4	#5	#6	Result	Notes
1st place, gold medalist(s)	Anita Márton	Hungary	18.29	18.30	19.48	x	18.96	19.62	19.62	NR, WL
2nd place, silver medalist(s)	Danniel Thomas-Dodd	Jamaica	18.92	18.95	19.22	x	18.86	19.07	19.22	NR
3rd place, bronze medalist(s)	Gong Lijiao	China	x	18.98	x	18.83	18.81	19.08	19.08	SB
4	Gao Yang	China	18.45	18.77	18.41	18.70	18.20	18.51	18.77	PB
5	Paulina Guba	Poland	18.53	x	18.16	18.31	18.54		18.54	
6	Aliona Dubitskaya	Belarus	x	x	18.21	x	x		18.21	SB
7	Yaniuvis López	Cuba	17.81	18.05	x	18.04	18.19		18.19	PB
8	Jeneva Stevens	United States	15.90	18.18	18.00	17.64	x		18.18	
9	Cleopatra Borel	Trinidad and Tobago	17.33	17.80	17.49				17.80	
10	Brittany Crew	Canada	x	17.61	16.13				17.61	
11	Yuliya Leantsiuk	Belarus	x	17.44	17.15				17.44	
12	Daniella Hill	United States	17.22	17.26	x				17.26	
13	Fanny Roos	Sweden	17.19	17.23	x				17.23	
14	Dimitriana Surdu	Moldova	17.15	17.22	x				17.22	
15	Radoslava Mavrodieva	Bulgaria	16.33	x	x				16.33	
