= 2009 World Youth Championships in Athletics =

- Host city: Brixen, Italy
- Events: 40
- Dates: 8–12 July
- Main venue: Brixen-Bressanone Sport Arena

The 2009 World Youth Championships in Athletics is the sixth edition of the IAAF World Youth Championships in Athletics. They were held at Brixen-Bressanone Sport Arena in Bressanone, Italy from 8–12 July 2009. Athletes had to be aged 16 or 17 on 31 December 2009 (born in 1992 or 1993) to compete.

15-year-old Jodie Williams took the 100 m sprint title in a youth world leading time of 11.39. This was also a personal best for Williams, who had not lost a 100 m final since 2007. Also winning the girls' 200 m, Williams became the first youth athlete ever to do so. A similar feat was achieved by Kirani James of Grenada, who won the boys' 200 and 400 metres.

With the 100 m hurdles, 17-year-old Isabelle Pedersen became Norway's first World Youth champion. Her time of 13.20 in the semi-finals was a national record and third all-time Youth best. 16-year-old Italian Alessia Trost also became the host nation's first World Youth champion.

Johan Rogestedt of Sweden became the first European ever to win the 800 metres, usually dominated by East African runners. In high jump, Russian-born Dmitriy Kroyter became Israel's first world youth champion.

== Medal summary ==
=== Boys ===
Event	Gold		Silver		Bronze	
100 m	Prezel Hardy; United States	10.57	Aaron Brown; Canada	10.74	Giovanni Galbieri; Italy	10.79
200 m	Kirani James; Grenada	21.05 PB	Alberto Gavalda; Spain	21.33 SB	Keenan Brock; United States	21.39
400 m	Kirani James; Grenada	45.24 CR WL PB	Joshua Mance; United States	46.22 PB	Awad El Karim Makki; Sudan	47.15 SB
800 m	Johan Rogestedt; Sweden	1:50.92 PB	Peter Langat Kiplangat; Kenya	1:50.97	Nicholas Kiplangat Kipkoech; Kenya	1:51.01
1500 m	Gideon Kiage Mageka; Kenya	3:37.36 WL	Caleb Mwangangi Ndiku; Kenya	3:38.42	Girma Bekele; Ethiopia	3:39.88 PB
3000 m	Isaiah Kiplangat Koech; Kenya	7:51.51 CR	David Kiprotich Bett; Kenya	7:52.13 PB	Goitom Kifle; Eritrea	8:05.83 PB
2000 m st.	Hillary Kipsang Yego; Kenya	5:25.33 WL	Peter Kibet Lagat; Kenya	5:26.59 PB	Desta Alemu; Ethiopia	5:37.32 PB
110 m H 91.4 cm	Dale Morgan; United States	13.28 WL	Jack Meredith; Great Britain	13.33 PB	Gregory MacNeil; Canada	13.51
400 m H 84.0 cm	Norge Sotomayor; Cuba	51.30 WL	Jeremiah Kipkorir Mutai; Kenya	51.45 PB	Jose Reynaldo Bencosme de Leon; Italy	51.74
10,000 m track walk	Hagen Pohle; Germany	41:35.99 CR WL PB	Dementiy Cheparev; Russia	41:53.76 PB	Ihor Lyashchenko; Ukraine	42:01.90 PB
Medley relay	United States; Colin Hepburn; Keenan Brock; Dedric Dukes; Joshua Mance	1:50.33 WYB	Brazil; Jonathas da Silva; Jean Roberto da Silva; Jackson da Silva; Leandro de Araújo	1:52.66 SB	Japan; Takumi Kuki; Ryota Yamagata; Ko Kayada; Shogo Momiki	1:52.82 SB
High jump	Dmitriy Kroyter; Israel	2.20	Janick Klausen; Denmark	2.20 PB	Django Lovett; Canada; Daniil Tsyplakov; Russia	2.17 PB 2.17 PB
Pole vault	Jin Min-sub; South Korea	5.15 PB	Carlo Paech; Germany	5.10	Daniel Clemens; Germany	5.10
Long jump	Supanara Sukhasvasti; Thailand	7.65 PB	Stefan Brits; South Africa	7.57	Yannick Roggatz; Germany	7.53 PB
Triple jump	Benjamin Williams; Great Britain	15.91 PB	Supanara Sukhasvasti; Thailand	15.70 PB	Aleksandr Yurchenko; Russia	15.66 PB
Shot put 5 kg	Ryan Crouser; United States	21.56 CR	Krzysztof Brzozowski; Poland	20.89 PB	Frans Schutte; South Africa	20.37 PB
Discus 1.500 kg	Hamid Manssour; Syria	64.20	Ryan Crouser; United States	61.64	Traves Smikle; Jamaica	61.22 PB
Hammer 5 kg	Chen Hongqiu; China	74.93 WL PB	Suhrob Khodjaev; Tajikistan	73.29 PB	Tomáš Kružliak; Slovakia	72.17
Javelin 700g	Shih-Feng Huang; Chinese Taipei	74.00	Killian Durechou; France	73.54	Braian Toledo; Argentina	73.44 PB
Octathlon	Kevin Mayer; France	6478 WL	Mohd Ahmed Al-Mannai; Qatar	6232 PB	Steffen Klink; Germany	6217 PB
WR world record | AR area record | CR championship record | GR games record | NR national record | OR Olympic record | PB personal best | SB season best | WL world leading (in a given season)

=== Girls ===
Event	Gold		Silver		Bronze	
100 m	Jodie Williams; Great Britain	11.39 WL PB	Allison Peter; U.S. Virgin Islands	11.47 PB	Ashton Purvis; United States	11.48 SB
200 m	Jodie Williams; Great Britain	23.08 WL	Allison Peter; U.S. Virgin Islands	23.08 WL	Ashton Purvis; United States	23.15 PB
400 m	Ebony Eutsey; United States	52.88	Michelle Brown; United States	53.44	Sandra Wagner; Sweden	53.52 PB
800 m	Cherono Koech; Kenya	2:01.67 CR	Ciara Mageean; Ireland	2:03.07 PB	Rowena Cole; Great Britain	2:03.83 PB
1500 m	Nelly Chebet Ngeiywo; Kenya	4:12.76 PB	Gete Dima; Ethiopia	4:15.16	Amela Terzić; Serbia	4:16.71 PB
3000 m	Purity Cherotich Rionoripo; Kenya	9:03.79	Jackline Chepngeno; Kenya	9:05.93 PB	Genet Yalew; Ethiopia	9:08.95 PB
2000 m st.	Korahubsh Itaa; Ethiopia	6:11.83 WYB	Lucia Kamene Muangi; Kenya	6:11.90 PB	Halima Hassen; Ethiopia	6:16.83 PB
100 m H 76.2 cm	Isabelle Pedersen; Norway	13.23	Kori Carter; United States	13.26 PB	Bridgette Owens; United States	13.39 PB
400 m H	Vera Rudakova; Russia	57.83 WL	Danielle Dowie; Jamaica	58.62	Déborah Rodríguez; Uruguay	59.71 PB
5,000 m track walk	Elena Lashmanova; Russia	22:55.45 WL	Yanelli Caballero; Mexico	22:59.27 PB	Svetlana Vasilyeva; Russia	23:00.15 PB
Medley relay	United States; Jordan Clark; Ashton Purvis; Briana Nelson; Ebony Eutsey	2:04.32 WL	Hungary; Anasztázia Nguyen; Kriszta Komiszár; Dorina Vincze; Lilla Loránd	2:09.22 PB	Romania; Ana Maria Rosianu; Ana Alungoaie; Sanda Belgyan; Adelina Pastor	2:09.25 PB
High jump	Alessia Trost; Italy	1.87	Mariya Kuchina; Russia; Amy Pejkovic; Australia	1.85 PB 1.85 PB		
Pole vault	Angelica Bengtsson; Sweden	4.32 WL	Michaela Meijer; Sweden	4.10	Felicia Horvath; Hungary Tatyana Stetsyuk; Russia	4.00 PB 4.00 PB
Long jump	Lu Minjia; China	6.22	Alina Rotaru; Romania	6.09	Jennifer Clayton; United States	6.05
Triple jump	Yana Borodina; Russia	13.63 WL	Deng Lina; China	13.57 PB	Valeriya Kanatova; Uzbekistan	13.45
Shot put	Lena Urbaniak; Germany	15.28	Margaret Satupai; Samoa	14.96 SB	Dong Yangzi; China	14.65 PB
Discus	Li Shanshan; China	51.65	Alex Collatz; United States	50.09	Shanice Craft; Germany	49.15
Hammer	Barbara Spiler; Slovenia	59.33	Kivilcim Kaya; Turkey	57.91 SB	Bianca Lazar Fazecas; Romania	56.41 PB
Javelin	Anastasiya Svechnikova; Uzbekistan	53.25 SB	Wu You; China	52.04 PB	Laura Henkel; Germany	51.47 PB
Heptathlon	Katarina Thompson; Great Britain	5750 WL	Laura Ikauniece; Latvia	5647 PB	Kira Biesenbach; Germany	5423 PB
WR world record | AR area record | CR championship record | GR games record | NR national record | OR Olympic record | PB personal best | SB season best | WL world leading (in a given season)

== Medals table ==
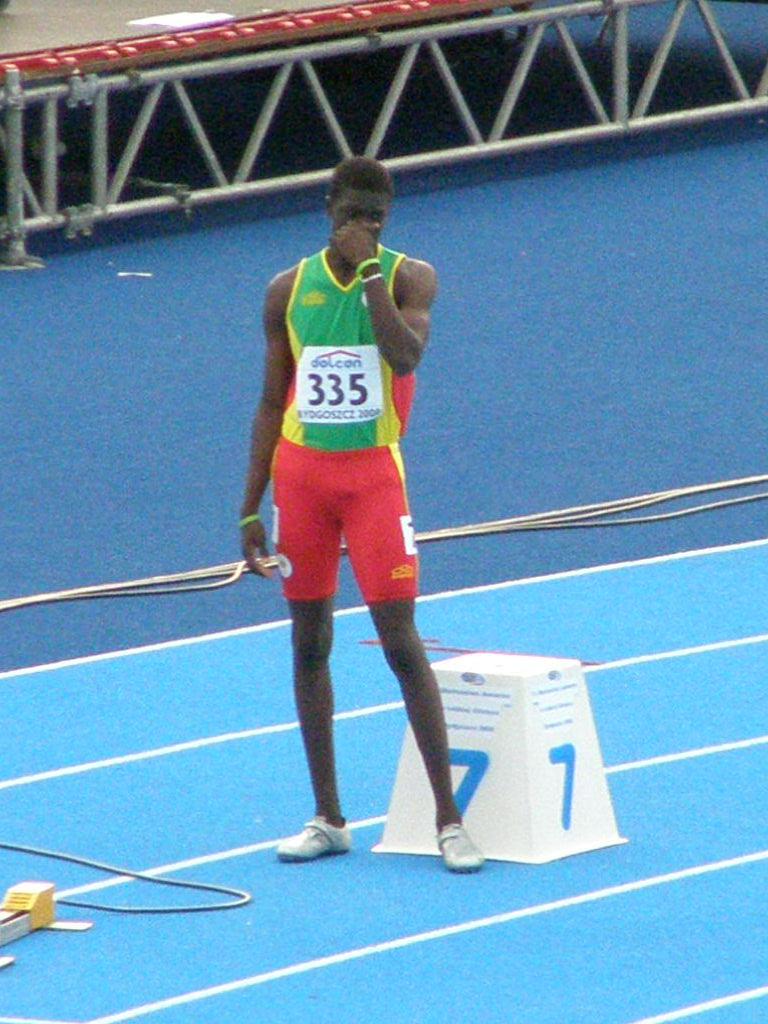
Kirani James of Grenada won a 200/400 m sprint double.

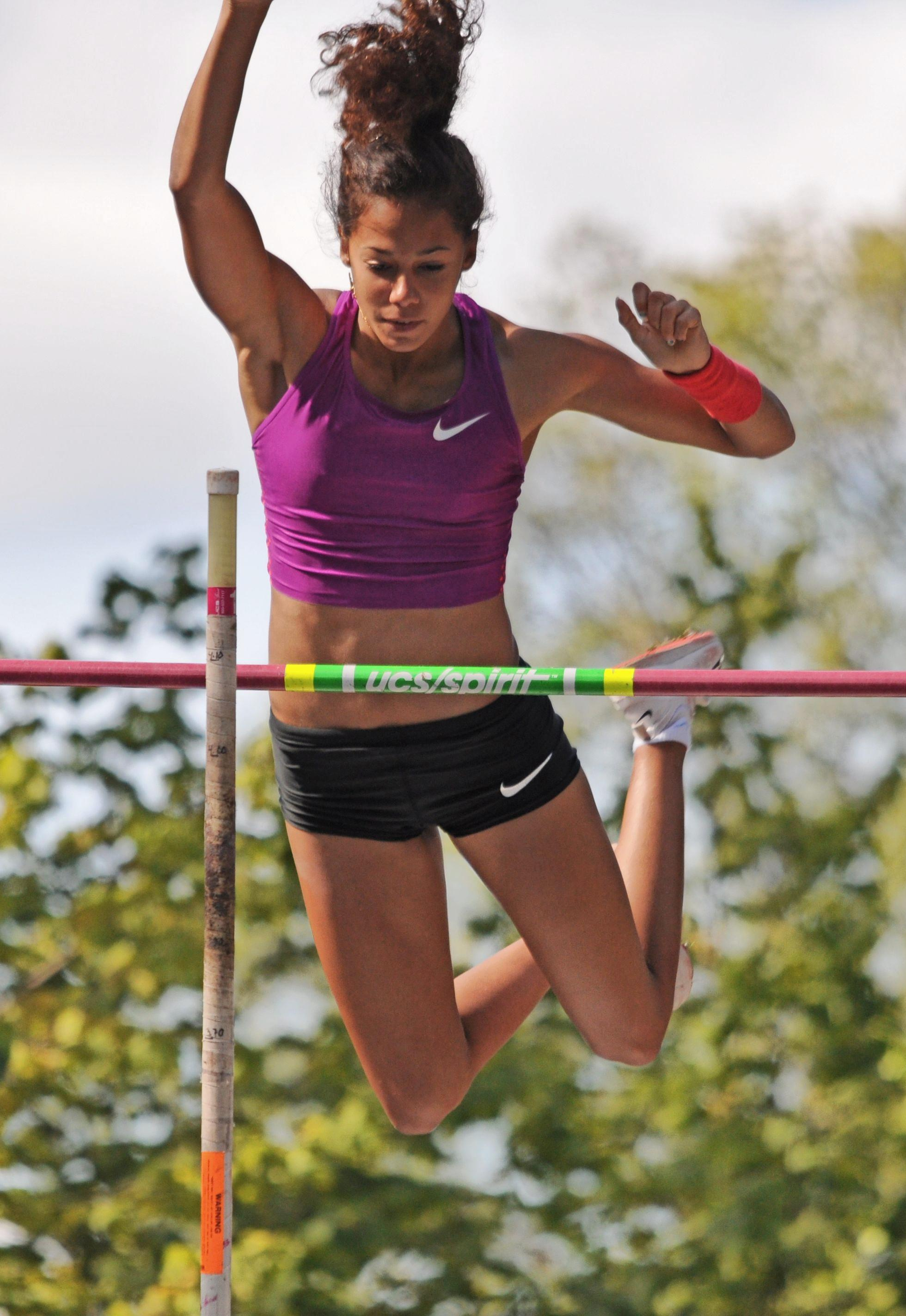
Angelica Bengtsson took the pole vault title for Sweden.

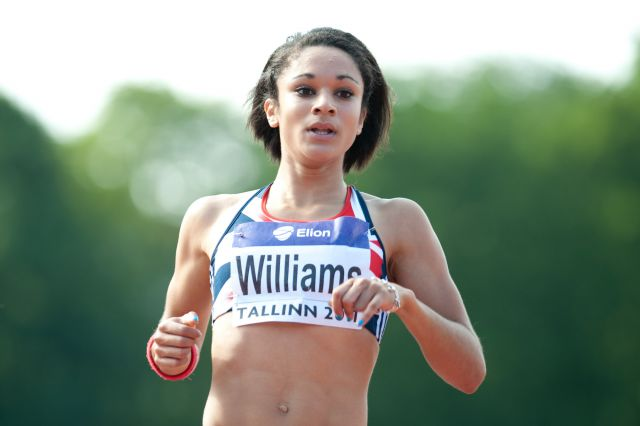
Jodie Williams won a 100/200 m sprint double for Great Britain.

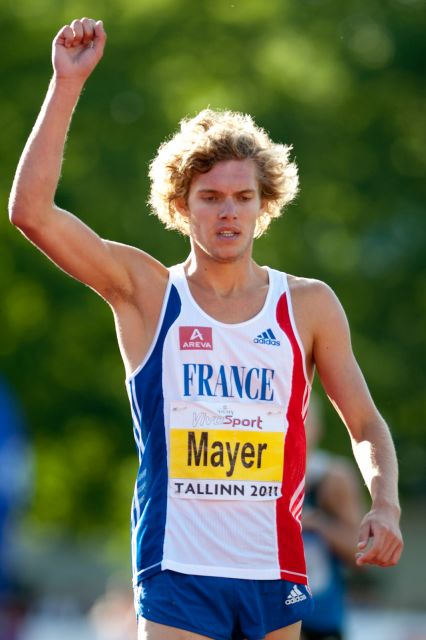
Kévin Mayer of France won the decathlon.

Rank	Nation	Gold	Silver	Bronze	Total
1	Kenya (KEN)	6	7	1	14
2	United States (USA)	6	5	5	16
3	Great Britain (GBR)	4	1	1	6
4	Russia (RUS)	3	2	4	9
5	China (CHN)	3	2	1	6
6	Germany (GER)	2	1	6	9
7	Sweden (SWE)	2	1	1	4
8	Grenada (GRN)	2	0	0	2
9	Ethiopia (ETH)	1	1	4	6
10	France (FRA)	1	1	0	2
10	Thailand (THA)	1	1	0	2
12	Italy (ITA)	1	0	2	3
13	Uzbekistan (UZB)	1	0	1	2
14	Chinese Taipei (TPE)	1	0	0	1
14	Cuba (CUB)	1	0	0	1
14	Israel (ISR)	1	0	0	1
14	Norway (NOR)	1	0	0	1
14	Slovenia (SLO)	1	0	0	1
14	South Korea (KOR)	1	0	0	1
14	Syria (SYR)	1	0	0	1
21	U.S. Virgin Islands (ISV)	0	2	0	2
22	Canada (CAN)	0	1	2	3
22	Romania (ROU)	0	1	2	3
24	Hungary (HUN)	0	1	1	2
24	Jamaica (JAM)	0	1	1	2
24	South Africa (RSA)	0	1	1	2
27	Australia (AUS)	0	1	0	1
27	Brazil (BRA)	0	1	0	1
27	Denmark (DEN)	0	1	0	1
27	Ireland (IRL)	0	1	0	1
27	Latvia (LAT)	0	1	0	1
27	Mexico (MEX)	0	1	0	1
27	Poland (POL)	0	1	0	1
27	Qatar (QAT)	0	1	0	1
27	Samoa (SAM)	0	1	0	1
27	Spain (ESP)	0	1	0	1
27	Tajikistan (TJK)	0	1	0	1
27	Turkey (TUR)	0	1	0	1
39	Argentina (ARG)	0	0	1	1
39	Eritrea (ERI)	0	0	1	1
39	Japan (JPN)	0	0	1	1
39	Serbia (SRB)	0	0	1	1
39	Slovakia (SVK)	0	0	1	1
39	Sudan (SUD)	0	0	1	1
39	Ukraine (UKR)	0	0	1	1
39	Uruguay (URU)	0	0	1	1
Totals (46 entries)		40	41	41	122

All Information taken from IAAF's website.

== Mascot ==
The mascot is a crow named Hugo, who is also the mascot of Brixia Meeting.
