= Laura Gedminaitė =

Lithuanian shot putter (born 1993)

Laura Gedminaitė (born 30 April 1993) is a Lithuanian shot putter. In 2010, she represented Lithuania in the 2010 Summer Youth Olympics, where she finished in 4th place.

== Achievements ==
Year	Competition	Venue	Position	Notes
Representing Lithuania
2009	World Youth Championships in Athletics	Brixen, Italy	13th	13.20
2010	Baltic U18 Athletics Match	Kaunas, Lithuania	1st	14.60
2010	Youth Olympics	Singapore City, Singapore	4th	15.15 (PB)
2013	European U23 Championships	Tampere, Finland	13th (q)	15.24 m
2015	European U23 Championships	Tallinn, Estonia	13th (q)	15.23 m
