= Athletics at the 2017 Summer Universiade – Women's shot put =

The women's shot put event at the 2017 Summer Universiade was held on 26–27 August 2017 at the Taipei Municipal Stadium.

== Medalists ==
Gold	Silver	Bronze
Brittany Crew; Canada	Klaudia Kardasz; Poland	Paulina Guba; Poland

== Results ==
=== Qualification ===
Qualification: 17.50 m (Q) or at least 12 best (q) qualified for the final.

Rank	Group	Athlete	Nationality	#1	#2	#3	Result	Notes
1	A	Natalia Duco	Chile	17.86			17.86	Q, SB
2	A	Brittany Crew	Canada	17.34	17.48	17.06	17.48	q
3	B	Sara Gambetta	Germany	17.33	17.46	17.07	17.46	q
4	B	Paulina Guba	Poland	17.01	17.31	17.36	17.36	q
5	A	Klaudia Kardasz	Poland	17.23	x	16.40	17.23	q
6	A	Lena Urbaniak	Germany	x	15.45	16.43	16.43	q
7	B	Viktoryia Kolb	Belarus	16.30	15.96	16.40	16.40	q
8	A	Amelia Strickler	Great Britain	x	x	16.38	16.38	q
9	A	María Fernanda Orozco	Mexico	15.40	15.64	15.69	15.69	q
10	B	Sarah Mitton	Canada	15.56	15.59	x	15.59	q
11	A	Lieke Muller	Netherlands	14.86	14.17	15.54	15.54	q
12	A	Portious Warren	Trinidad and Tobago	15.01	x	15.50	15.50	q
13	A	Giedre Kupstyte	Lithuania	14.90	15.44	15.11	15.44	
14	B	Christine Bohan	United States	15.13	x	14.78	15.13	
15	B	Ieva Zarankaitė	Lithuania	15.11	14.41	14.30	15.11	
16	A	Ischke Senekal	South Africa	14.86	x	14.83	14.86	
17	B	Frida Åkerström	Sweden	14.33	14.35	x	14.35	
18	B	Chiang Ru-ching	Chinese Taipei	x	13.82	14.11	14.11	
19	B	Anna Mikkelsen	Denmark	13.86	12.92	12.78	13.86	SB
20	B	Kachnar Chaudhary	India	12.87	12.31	12.70	12.87	
21	A	Katrina Sirma	Latvia	10.95	10.73	10.94	10.95	
22	B	Stephanya Gómez	Peru	9.70	x	x	9.70	
23	B	Norma Resnik	Slovenia	9.46	8.78	9.59	9.59	SB
	A	Dimitriana Surdu	Moldova	x	x	x	NM	

=== Final ===
Official Video

Rank	Name	Nationality	#1	#2	#3	#4	#5	#6	Result	Notes
1st place, gold medalist(s)	Brittany Crew	Canada	17.74	17.72	18.00	x	x	18.34	18.34	
2nd place, silver medalist(s)	Klaudia Kardasz	Poland	x	x	16.73	16.90	17.71	17.90	17.90	PB
3rd place, bronze medalist(s)	Paulina Guba	Poland	17.32	x	17.21	17.23	17.76	17.36	17.76	
4	Natalia Duco	Chile	17.09	17.33	17.73	x	x	17.63	17.73	
5	Sara Gambetta	Germany	16.75	17.60	x	x	x	x	17.60	
6	Amelia Strickler	Great Britain	16.39	x	16.63	x	17.13	16.56	17.13	PB
7	Lena Urbaniak	Germany	x	16.68	16.35	16.08	x	16.72	16.72	
8	Viktoryia Kolb	Belarus	15.86	16.22	16.58	x	16.04	x	16.58	
9	María Fernanda Orozco	Mexico	15.85	16.13	16.44				16.44	SB
10	Sarah Mitton	Canada	16.01	x	16.32				16.32	PB
11	Lieke Muller	Netherlands	15.46	14.98	x				15.46	
12	Portious Warren	Trinidad and Tobago	x	13.82	15.03				15.03	
