= Michael Cochrane (disambiguation) =

Michael Cochrane may refer to:

- Michael Cochrane (born 1947), English actor
- Michael Cochrane (musician) (born 1948), American jazz pianist
- Michael Cochrane (hurdler) (born 1991), New Zealand hurdler
- Mickey Cochrane (1903-1962), American baseball player
