= 2012 World Junior Championships in Athletics – Women's shot put =

The women's shot put at the 2012 World Junior Championships in Athletics will be held at the Estadi Olímpic Lluís Companys on 10 July.

== Medalists ==
Gold	Silver	Bronze
Shanice Craft; Germany	Gao Yang; China	Bian Ka; China

== Records ==
Prior to the competition, the existing world junior and championship records were as follows.

World Junior Record	Astrid Kumbernuss (GDR)	20.54 m	Orimattila, Finland	1 July 1989
Championship Record	Cheng Xiaoyan (CHN)	18.74 m	Lisbon, Portugal	21 July 1994
World Junior Leading	Guo Tiangian (CHN)	17.10 m	Zhaoqing, China	14 April 2012

== Results ==
=== Qualification ===
Qualification: Standard 15.70 m (Q) or at least best 12 qualified (q)

Rank	Group	Name	Nationality	#1	#2	#3	Result	Note
1	A	Shanice Craft	Germany	16.41			16.41	Q, PB
2	A	Emel Dereli	Turkey	16.27			16.27	Q
3	B	Christina Hillman	United States	15.09	15.36	16.11	16.11	Q
4	B	Natalya Troneva	Russia	15.99			15.99	Q
5	A	Bian Ka	China	x	15.66	15.88	15.88	Q
6	A	Sophie McKinna	Great Britain	15.80			15.80	Q
7	B	Gao Yang	China	15.77			15.77	Q
8	B	Jolien Boumkwo	Belgium	14.56	x	15.38	15.38	q, PB
9	A	Lezaan Jordaan	South Africa	14.79	15.27	15.07	15.27	q, PB
10	A	Torie Owers	United States	14.65	14.82	x	14.82	q
11	B	María Belén Toimil	Spain	13.98	14.52	x	14.52	q
12	A	Lai Li-chun	Chinese Taipei	13.51	14.24	14.51	14.51	q, SB
13	B	Fanny Roos	Sweden	14.11	14.32	x	14.32	
14	B	Monia Cantarella	Italy	13.99	14.09	14.30	14.30	
15	B	Viktoriya Kolb	Belarus	14.25	14.23	14.15	14.25	
16	B	Fadya Saad El Kasaby	Egypt	13.24	13.72	14.10	14.10	
17	A	Brittany Crew	Canada	13.32	13.92	14.03	14.03	
18	A	Kätlin Piirimäe	Estonia	13.33	x	13.98	13.98	
19	A	Petra Gamilec	Croatia	13.61	x	13.83	13.83	
20	B	Andreea Huzum-Vitan	Romania	13.25	13.68	12.94	13.68	
21	A	Ivana Gallardo	Chile	12.76	12.32	13.55	13.55	
22	B	Jillian Weir	Canada	13.41	13.31	x	13.41	

=== Final ===
Rank	Name	Nationality	#1	#2	#3	#4	#5	#6	Result	Note
1st place, gold medalist(s)	Shanice Craft	Germany	17.15	16.12	16.12	x	x	–	17.15	WJL
2nd place, silver medalist(s)	Gao Yang	China	16.45	16.34	x	16.57	x	16.14	16.57	
3rd place, bronze medalist(s)	Bian Ka	China	15.78	15.87	16.16	16.05	16.48	16.16	16.48	
4	Christina Hillman	United States	16.03	15.94	16.27	x	15.93	16.12	16.27	
5	Natalya Troneva	Russia	15.69	15.52	15.75	15.71	16.07	16.18	16.18	
6	Sophie McKinna	Great Britain	15.98	15.32	15.43	15.83	15.57	x	15.98	
7	Torie Owers	United States	15.00	15.88	15.17	15.13	x	14.89	15.88	
8	Emel Dereli	Turkey	14.71	15.86	15.33	15.35	15.76	x	15.86	
9	Lezaan Jordaan	South Africa	15.37	14.82	14.96				15.37	PB
10	Jolien Boumkwo	Belgium	x	15.31	14.86				15.31	
11	Lai Li-chun	Chinese Taipei	14.30	14.08	13.47				14.30	
12	María Belén Toimil	Spain	14.29	13.96	14.24				14.29	

== Participation ==
According to an unofficial count, 22 athletes from 19 countries participated in the event.

- Belarus (1)
- Belgium (1)
- Canada (2)
- Chile (1)
- China (2)
- Chinese Taipei (1)
- Croatia (1)
- Egypt (1)
- Estonia (1)
- Germany (1)
- Italy (1)
- Romania (1)
- Russia (1)
- South Africa (1)
- Spain (1)
- Sweden (1)
- Turkey (1)
- United Kingdom (1)
- United States (2)
