= Li Shanshan =

Li Shanshan is the name of:

- Li Shanshan (basketball) (born 1987), Chinese basketball player
- Li Shanshan (gymnast) (born 1992), Chinese gymnast
- Li Shanshan (discus thrower) (born 1992), Chinese discus thrower

== See also ==
- Lee San-san (born 1977), Hong Kong actress
