= Old Melburnians Athletics Club =

Athletics club

The Old Melburnians Athletics Club is a track and field club based in Melbourne, Australia.

== History ==
The precursor to the Old Melburnians Athletic Club (O.M.A.C.) was the Melburnian Hare & Hounds club, which organised various runs and competitions. Started in 1892, it was one of the four founding clubs of the Victorian Amateur Athletic Association (V.A.A.A.) (now Athletics Victoria) in 1891. One of its members, Edwin Flack, was in Europe at the time of the first modern Olympics and won both the 800m and 1500m events (making him the first Australian to win a gold medal at the Olympic Games and allowing Australia to be one of less than a handful of nations to have competed at every Summer Olympics).

When the Hare & Hounds club folded, Jack Newman (a 1924 Olympian) proposed the setting up of the O.M.A.C. As he was a member of St.Stephens Harriers Athletic Club and could not obtain a transfer, he had to stand out of athletic competition for a year in order to become a member of the Club. In 1978 the Old Wesley Athletic Club amalgamated with the O.M.A.C. for the purposes of V.A.A.A. competition. They continue to conduct a separate cross-country team in the APSOB competition, but in all other respects their members are normal O.M.A.C. members.

In 1979 the Powerhouse Athletic Club also amalgamated with the O.M.A.C. Originally their members were only second-claim members of the O.M.A.C., but they are now full members.

Over the years the club has had many Olympians. Scott Ferrier, Michael Hazel and Peter Winter are the most recent Olympians the club has produced.

Today the club has Australia's finest young talent. Australian record holders Sam Baines and Henry Frayne compete for the club. Sam Baines holds the under 18 110m hurdles record of 13.28 seconds and Henry Frayne holds the under 20 triple jump record with a leap of 16.58 metres.
