= Siddhanth Thingalaya =

Indian hurdler

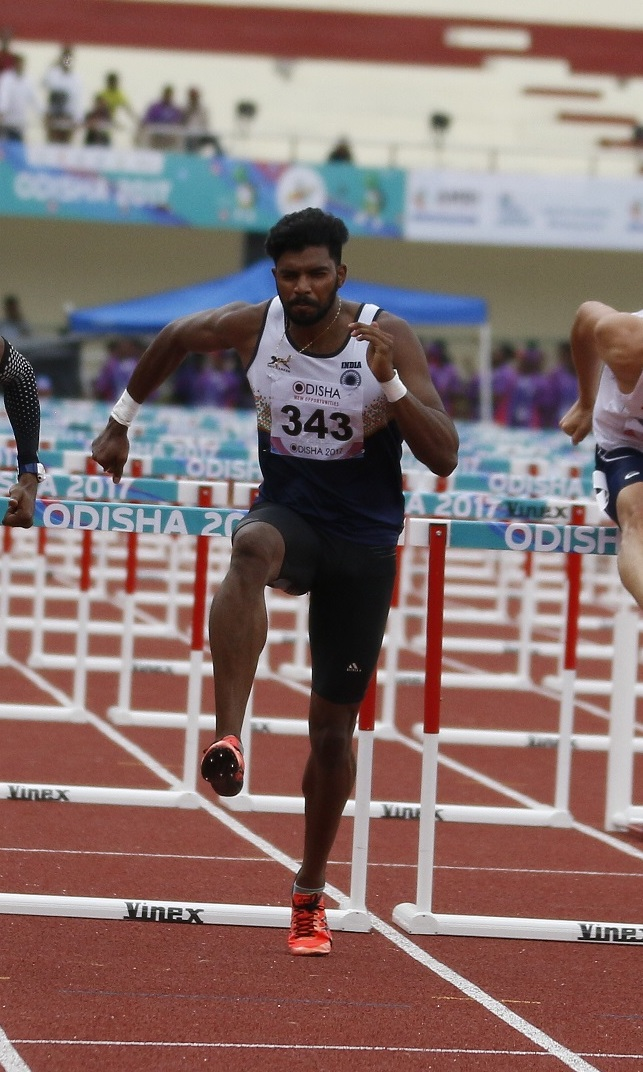
- Thingalaya at the 2017 Asian Championships

Personal information
- Nationality: Indian
- Born: 3 January 1991 (age 35) Mumbai, Maharashtra, India
- Education: Mithibai College
- Height: 1.93 m (6 ft 4 in)

Sport
- Sport: Track and field
- Event: 110 m hurdles

Achievements and titles
- Personal best: 13.48 (Mesa 2017)

Siddhanth Thingalaya (born 3 January 1991) is an Indian track and field athlete who specializes in the 110 m hurdles.

== Career ==
Siddhanth started his athlete career while he was 11 years old. Started participating in inter-school events. His first success in 110 m hurdles came when he won the inter-university title at Kochi, in 2008. He followed it up with a bronze medal at the 9th National Federation Cup junior athletics championship in Lucknow, with time of 14.69 seconds (99.0 cm hurdles).

Siddhanth had training stint in Australia under Mittal Champions Trust and had participated at South Africa under the Mittal Champions Trust and clocked 14.31 seconds at the high altitude Potchefstroom in March 2010. Few months later, he went on to win the silver medal in the Asian Junior Meet in Hanoi, Vietnam, clocking a personal best 13.96 seconds (99.0 cm hurdles), while setting a new Indian Junior record. He competed for India in the 2010 World Junior Championships, missing qualifying for the semi-finals by .03 in his heat running 14.09.

Currently Siddhanth is being trained by Gary Cablayan, who is a certified USA track and field coach in the sprints, hurdles and relays. He expertise in elite speed specialist and has been training many NFL players like DeSean Jackson and John Ross (American football). He has also coached two Olympians Olutoyin Augustus from Nigeria and Kenneth Medwood from Belize

Thingalaya improved his personal best timing to 14.20 seconds in the heats of men's 110 m hurdles during the 50th National Inter-State Athletics Championships held in Patiala. In the finals, on 7 August 2010, he broke the Indian National record (held by K. Krishna Mohan) by clocking 13.81 seconds while winning the gold. His margin of victory was an impressive 0.65 s as he finished ahead of his rivals, Tamil Nadu’s P. Muthuswamy and Punjab’s Amandeep Singh.

== International competitions ==
Year	Competition	Venue	Position	Event	Notes
Representing India
2017	World Championships	(United Kingdom) London	Heat	110 metres hurdles	13.64
2017	UW Indoor Preview	(United States) Seattle	1st	60 metres hurdles(indoor)	7.70
2017	Altis Invitational	(United States) Arizona	1st	110 metres hurdles	13.48
2016	UW Preview Indoor	(United States) Seattle	1st	60 metres hurdles (indoor)	7.86
2016	Mountain T's Invitational	(United States) Arizona	1st	60 metres hurdles (indoor)	7.80
2016	NTC Pure Athletics Elite Invitational	(United States) Florida	1st	110 metres hurdles	13.59
2016	Canyon State Games	(United States) Arizona	1st	110 metres hurdles	13.54
2015	UCLA Rafer Johnson Jackie Joyner Kersee Invitational	(United States) Los Angeles	1st	110 metres hurdles	13.83
2015	21st Asian Athletics Championships	(China) Wuhan	Heat	110 metres hurdles	14.10
2014	Commonwealth Games	(Scotland) Glasgow	Heat	110 metres hurdles	13.91
2014	Asian Games	(South Korea) Incheon	6th	110 metres hurdles	13.71
2013	91st Australian Athletics Championships	(Australia) Sydney	1st	110 metres hurdles	13.72
2013	Asian Athletics Grand Prix Series-Leg 1	(Thailand) Bangkok	2nd	110 metres hurdles	13.88
2013	Asian Athletics Grand Prix Series-Leg 2	(Thailand) Chonburi	3rd	110 metres hurdles	13.90
2013	Asian Athletics Grand Prix Series-Leg 3	(Sri Lanka) Colombo	1st	110 metres hurdles	13.81
2013	20th Asian Athletics Championships	(India) Pune	4th	110 metres hurdles	13.89
2012	Sydney Track Classic	(Australia) Sydney	1st	110 metres hurdles	14.03
2012	Qantas Melbourne Track Classic	(Australia) Melbourne	1st	110 metres hurdles	14.13
2012	90th Australian Athletics Championships	(Australia) Melbourne	1st	110 metres hurdles	13.66
2011	Perth Track Classic	(Australia) Perth	1st	110 metres hurdles	14.00
2011	89th Australian Athletics Championships	(Australia) Melbourne	1st	110 metres hurdles	14.14
2010	Asian Junior Athletics Championships	(Vietnam) Hanoi	2nd	110 metres hurdles (99.0 cm)	13.96
2010	IAAF World U20 Championships	(Canada) Moncton	Heat	110 metres hurdles (99.0 cm)	14.09
2010	Commonwealth Games	(India) Delhi	Heat	110 metres hurdles	14.06
2010	Asian Games	(China) Guangzhou	DNF	110 metres hurdles	NA
