= 2015 European Athletics Indoor Championships – Women's shot put =

The women's shot put event at the 2015 European Athletics Indoor Championships was held on 5 March 2015 at 16:30 (qualification) and 7 March, 18:15 (final) local time.

== Medalists ==
Gold	Silver	Bronze
Anita Márton; Hungary	Yuliya Leantsiuk; Belarus	Radoslava Mavrodieva; Bulgaria

== Records ==
Standing records prior to the 2015 European Athletics Indoor Championships
World record	Helena Fibingerová (TCH)	22.50	Jablonec, Czechoslovakia	19 February 1977
European record	Helena Fibingerová (TCH)	22.50	Jablonec, Czechoslovakia	19 February 1977
Championship record	Helena Fibingerová (TCH)	21.46	San Sebastián, Spain	13 March 1977
World Leading	Michelle Carter (USA)	19.45	Boston, United States	1 March 2015
European Leading	Yuliya Leantsiuk (BLR)	19.00	Mogilev, Belarus	20 February 2015

== Results ==
=== Qualification ===
Qualification: Qualification Performance 17.85 (Q) or at least 8 best performers advanced to the final.

Rank	Athlete	Nationality	#1	#2	#3	Result	Note
1	Anita Márton	Hungary	18.44			18.44	Q
2	Yuliya Leantsiuk	Belarus	18.33			18.33	Q
3	Alena Abrahmchuk	Belarus	x	17.80	17.78	17.80	q
4	Paulina Guba	Poland	17.02	17.73	–	17.73	q, SB
5	Úrsula Ruiz	Spain	17.44	x	x	17.44	q
6	Radoslava Mavrodieva	Bulgaria	x	17.06	17.18	17.18	q
7	Anastasiya Podolskaya	Russia	16.84	16.77	16.61	16.84	q
8	Denise Hinrichs	Germany	16.39	16.67	16.78	16.78	q
9	Chiara Rosa	Italy	x	16.38	16.75	16.75	
10	Fanny Roos	Sweden	16.45	16.61	16.49	16.61	
11	Lena Urbaniak	Germany	15.83	16.49	x	16.49	
12	Trine Mulbjerg	Denmark	x	15.96	x	15.96	
13	Jana Kárníková	Czech Republic	x	15.82	15.95	15.95	
14	Martina Hrašnová	Slovakia	x	x	13.39	13.39	
	Kätlin Piirimäe	Estonia				DNS	

=== Final ===
Rank	Athlete	Nationality	#1	#2	#3	#4	#5	#6	Result	Note
1st place, gold medalist(s)	Anita Márton	Hungary	18.05	18.39	18.56	18.29	18.43	19.23	19.23	NR
2nd place, silver medalist(s)	Yuliya Leantsiuk	Belarus	17.85	17.90	18.60	x	18.43	18.47	18.60	
3rd place, bronze medalist(s)	Radoslava Mavrodieva	Bulgaria	17.45	17.83	x	x	17.61	17.80	17.83	
4	Alena Abrahmchuk	Belarus	17.63	x	x	x	17.53	x	17.63	
5	Paulina Guba	Poland	16.95	17.05	17.47	x	x	17.03	17.47	
6	Denise Hinrichs	Germany	16.82	17.35	16.94	x	16.94	17.04	17.35	
7	Anastasiya Podolskaya	Russia	16.71	16.81	x	x	x	16.42	16.81	
8	Úrsula Ruiz	Spain	16.02	x	x	x	16.07	x	16.07	
