= 2013 Asian Athletics Championships – Men's 110 metres hurdles =

The men's 110 metres hurdles event at the 2013 Asian Athletics Championships was held at the Shree Shiv Chhatrapati Sports Complex. The final took place on 5 July.

== Medalists ==
| Gold | Silver | Bronze |
|---|---|---|
| Jiang Fan; China | Abdulaziz Al-Mandeel; Kuwait | Wataru Yazawa; Japan |

== Results ==
=== Heats ===
First 2 in each heat (Q) and 2 best performers (q) advanced to the semifinals.

Wind: Heat 1: +0.3 m/s, Heat 2: -0.4 m/s, Heat 3: +0.5 m/s

| Rank | Heat | Name | Nationality | Time | Notes |
|---|---|---|---|---|---|
| 1 | 3 | Siddhanth Thingalaya | India | 13.85 | Q |
| 2 | 3 | Jiang Fan | China | 13.86 | Q |
| 3 | 1 | Jamras Rittidet | Thailand | 13.88 | Q |
| 4 | 1 | Wataru Yazawa | Japan | 13.91 | Q |
| 5 | 3 | Rami Ibrahim | Iraq | 13.93 | q |
| 6 | 2 | Abdulaziz Al-Mandeel | Kuwait | 13.95 | Q |
| 7 | 2 | Park Tae-Kyong | South Korea | 13.96 | Q |
| 8 | 2 | Ameer Shaker | Iraq | 13.97 | q |
| 9 | 2 | Ji Wei | China | 13.98 | |
| 10 | 2 | Ahmad Hazer | Lebanon | 14.13 | |
| 11 | 3 | Rayzam Shah Wan Sofian | Malaysia | 14.28 | |
| 12 | 1 | Eric Shauwn Cray | Philippines | 14.31 | |
| 13 | 1 | Balamurugan | India | 14.59 | |
| 14 | 1 | Denis Semenov | Kazakhstan | 14.69 | |
| 14 | 2 | Pinto Mathew | India | 14.69 | |
| 16 | 1 | Yang Wei-Ting | Chinese Taipei | 14.89 | |
| 17 | 3 | Saif Sabbah Khalifa | Qatar | 14.99 | |
| | 1 | Kim Byoung-Jun | South Korea | DNF | |
| | 3 | Rouhollah Askari | Iran | DNS | |

=== Final ===
Wind: +0.1 m/s

| Rank | Name | Nationality | Time | Notes |
|---|---|---|---|---|
| 1st place, gold medalist(s) | Jiang Fan | China | 13.61 | |
| 2nd place, silver medalist(s) | Abdulaziz Al-Mandeel | Kuwait | 13.78 | |
| 3rd place, bronze medalist(s) | Wataru Yazawa | Japan | 13.88 | |
| 4 | Siddhanth Thingalaya | India | 13.89 | |
| 5 | Jamras Rittidet | Thailand | 14.07 | |
| 6 | Ameer Shaker | Iraq | 25.05 | |
| | Park Tae-Kyong | South Korea | DQ | |
| | Rami Ibrahim | Iraq | DQ | |
