= Gao Yang (shot putter) =

Chinese shot putter (born 1993)

Gao Yang (born 1 March 1993) is a Chinese athlete specialising in the shot put. She finished fifth at the 2015 World Championships in Beijing. In addition she won several medals on continental level and the silver at the 2012 World Junior Championships.

Her personal bests in the event are 19.20 metres outdoors (Neubrandenburg 2016) and 18.77 metres indoors (Birmingham 2018).

== Competition record ==
Year	Competition	Venue	Position	Event	Notes
Representing China
2012	World Junior Championships	Barcelona, Spain	2nd	Shot put	16.57 m
2013	Asian Championships	Pune, India	3rd	Shot put	17.76 m
2015	Asian Championships	Wuhan, China	2nd	Shot put	17.98 m
2015	World Championships	Beijing, China	5th	Shot put	19.04 m
2016	World Indoor Championships	Portland, United States	8th	Shot put	17.67 m
2016	Olympic Games	Rio de Janeiro, Brazil	33rd (q)	Shot put	16.17 m
2017	World Championships	London, United Kingdom	5th	Shot put	18.25 m
2018	World Indoor Championships	Birmingham, United Kingdom	4th	Shot put	18.77 m
2018	Asian Games	Jakarta, Indonesia	2nd	Shot put	17.64 m
2021	Olympic Games	Tokyo, Japan	10th	Shot put	18.67 m
