= 2015 Asian Athletics Championships – Women's shot put =

The women's shot put event at the 2015 Asian Athletics Championships was held on June 7.

== Results ==
Rank	Name	Nationality	#1	#2	#3	#4	#5	#6	Result	Notes
1st place, gold medalist(s)	Guo Tianqian	China	17.50	17.23	18.45	18.59	x	x	18.59	
2nd place, silver medalist(s)	Gao Yang	China	17.78	17.92	17.98	x	x	17.60	17.98	
3rd place, bronze medalist(s)	Bian Ka	China	17.05	17.77	x	17.33	x	17.78	17.78	
4	Lin Chia-Ying	Chinese Taipei	15.01	x	x	x	x	15.58	15.58	
