= Paulina Guba =

Polish shot putter (born 1991)

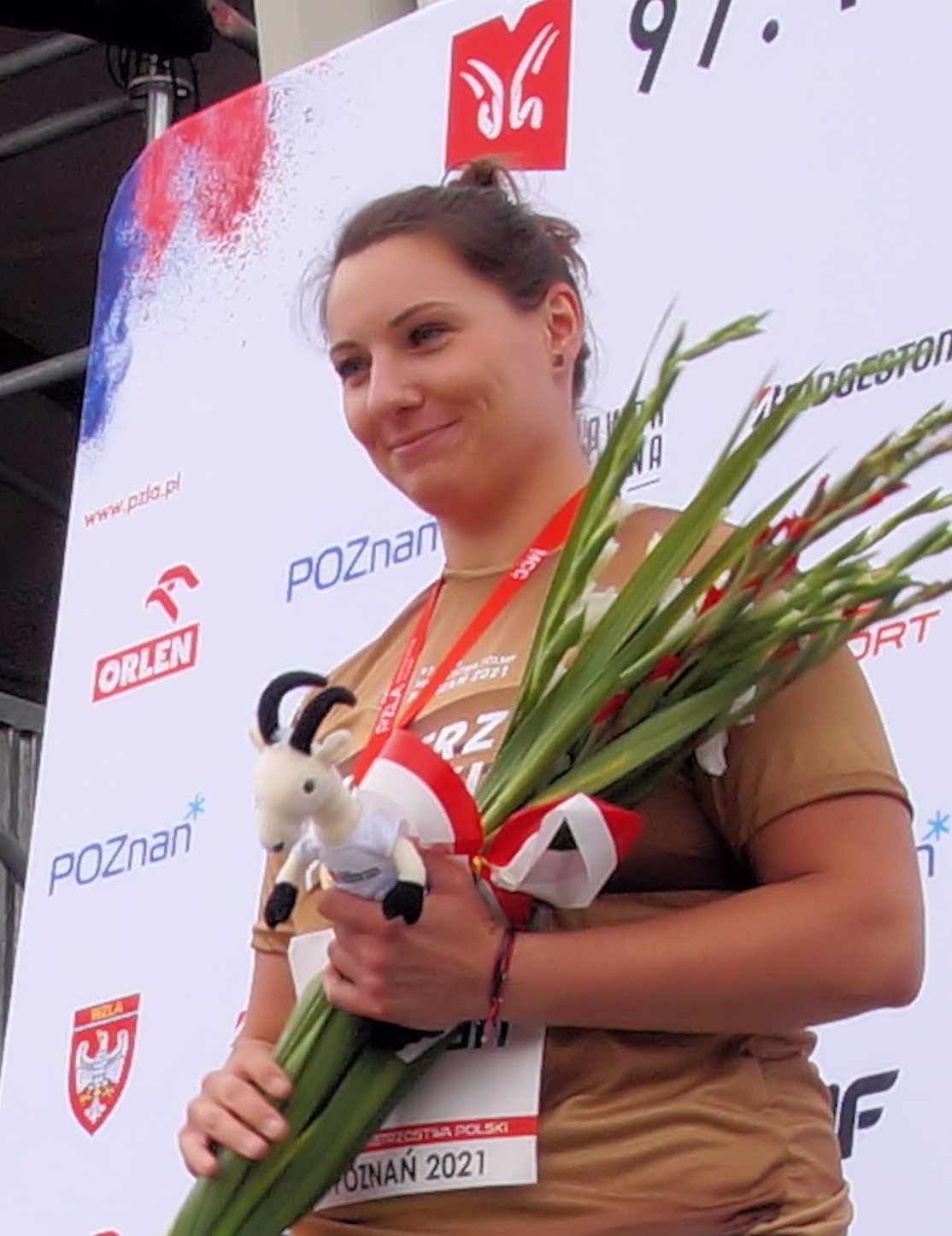
- Guba in 2021

Personal information
- Full name: Paulina Renata Guba
- Born: 14 May 1991 (age 35) Otwock, Poland
- Education: AWFiS Gdańsk; Jędrzej Śniadecki Academy
- Height: 1.80 m (5 ft 11 in)
- Weight: 90 kg (198 lb)

Sport
- Sport: Track and field
- Event: Shot put
- Club: Start Otwock
- Coached by: Edmund Antczak
Medal record
Women's athletics
Representing Poland
European Championships
Gold medal – first place	2018 Berlin	Shot put
Summer Universiade
Silver medal – second place	2015 Gwangju	Shot put
Bronze medal – third place	2017 Taipei	Shot put
Military World Games
Gold medal – first place	2019 Wuhan	Shot put

Paulina Renata Guba (born 14 May 1991) is a Polish athlete specialising in the shot put. She won the silver medal at the 2015 Summer Universiade. She also represented her country at the 2015 World Championships finishing eleventh. She has achieved title Woman Shot Put European Champion 2018 from Athletics Championships played in Berlin. She also won the gold medal at Seaman third class (OR-1, pl:Marynarz) at the World Military Competition 2019 in China, what has contributed that Poland took 5th place Nations of the World.

Her personal bests in the event are 19.38 metres outdoors (Cetniewo 2018) and 18.77 metres indoors (Toruń 2018).

== Competition record ==
Year	Competition	Venue	Position	Event	Notes
Representing Poland
2009	European Junior Championships	Novi Sad, Serbia	4th	Shot put	15.63 m
2010	World Junior Championships	Moncton, Canada	5th	Shot put	15.20 m
2011	European U23 Championships	Ostrava, Czech Republic	4th	Shot put	17.17 m
2012	World Indoor Championships	Istanbul, Turkey	13th (q)	Shot put	17.15 m
2012	European Championships	Helsinki, Finland	10th	Shot put	17.09 m
2013	European U23 Championships	Tampere, Finland	5th	Shot put	16.57 m
2015	European Indoor Championships	Prague, Czech Republic	5th	Shot put	17.47 m
2015	Universiade	Gwangju, South Korea	2nd	Shot put	17.94 m
2015	World Championships	Beijing, China	11th	Shot put	17.52 m
2016	European Championships	Amsterdam, Netherlands	11th	Shot put	16.95 m
2016	Olympic Games	Rio de Janeiro, Brazil	13th (q)	Shot put	17.70 m
2017	European Indoor Championships	Belgrade, Serbia	6th	Shot put	18.00 m
2017	World Championships	London, United Kingdom	16th (q)	Shot put	17.52 m
2017	Universiade	Taipei, Taiwan	3rd	Shot put	17.76 m
2018	World Indoor Championships	Birmingham, United Kingdom	5th	Shot put	18.54 m
2018	European Championships	Berlin, Germany	1st	Shot put	19.33 m
2019	World Championships	Doha, Qatar	10th	Shot put	18.02 m
2019	Military World Games	Wuhan, China	1st	Shot put	18.22 m
2021	Olympic Games	Tokyo, Japan	27th (q)	Shot put	16.98 m
2022	European Championships	Munich, Germany	20th (q)	Shot put	16.66 m
