= 2008 Oceania Youth Athletics Championships =

IX Oceania Youth Athletics Championships
- Dates: June 25–28
- Host city: Saipan, Northern Mariana Islands
- Venue: Oleai Sports Complex
- Level: Youth
- Events: 37 (19 boys, 18 girls)
- Participation: 112 (65 boys, 47 girls) athletes from 21 nations

The 2008 Oceania Youth Athletics Championships were held at the Oleai Sports Complex in Saipan, Northern Mariana Islands, between June 25–28, 2008. They were held together with the 2008 Oceania Open Championships. A total of 37 events were contested, 19 by boys and 18 by girls.

== Medal summary ==
Complete results can be found on the websites of the Oceania Athletics Association, and of the World Junior Athletics History.

=== Boys under 18 (Youth) ===
Event	Gold		Silver		Bronze	
100 metres (wind: -0.5m/s)	Alex Jordan (NZL)	11.38	Andy Lui (TGA)	11.50	Daniel McLean (AUS)	11.55
200 metres (wind: 0.4m/s)	Alex Jordan (NZL)	21.93	Mason Holm (AUS)	22.55	Joe Matmat (PNG)	22.97
400 metres	Joel Armstrong (NZL)	49.53	Dean Searles (AUS)	50.32	Kiakia Tekambwa (KIR)	52.10
800 metres	Dean Searles (AUS)	1:57.19	Tom Hall (NZL)	2:00.76	Yann Follin (PYF)	2:04.81
1500 metres	Tom Hall (NZL)	4:24.14	Douglas Schmidt (PLW)	4:28.68	Christopher Magtoto (GUM)	4:30.89
3000 metres	Christopher Magtoto (GUM)	9:51.88	Gregory Foasilafu (SOL)	9:51.98	Victorino Untalan (NMI)	11:10.92
110 metres hurdles (wind: -0.6m/s)	Daniel McLean (AUS)	14.62	Andy Lui (TGA)	14.88	Michael Cochrane (NZL)	14.97
400 metres hurdles	Michael Cochrane (NZL)	54.69	Andy Lui (TGA)	54.75	Malenckov Towai (GUM)	1:05.67
High jump	Nick Gerrard (NZL)	1.90	Michael Cochrane (NZL)	1.70	Trevor Ogumoro (NMI)	1.60
Long jump	/Christopher Igorra (NCL)	6.63	John Kendall (NZL)	6.62	Nick Gerrard (NZL)	6.60
Triple jump	Daniel Fake (NZL)	13.36	Linc Port (AUS)	13.29	John Kendall (NZL)	13.06
Shot put	Vincent Lasei (SAM)	15.49	William Hubber (NZL)	14.26	Denis Taripo (COK)	13.66
Discus throw	Vincent Lasei (SAM)	46.83	Travis Ambrum (AUS)	43.05	Henry Taripo (COK)	38.53
Hammer throw	Alexis Valdenaire (PYF)	50.24	William Hubber (NZL)	47.52	Travis Ambrum (AUS)	46.78
Javelin throw	Daniel Tutai (COK)	52.76	Denis Taripo (COK)	46.27		
Octathlon	Lars Fa'apoi (TGA)	4288	Trevor Ogumoro (NMI)	3256	Aldrin Zapanta (GUM)	2891
6.0km Cross Country	Gregory Foasilafu (SOL)	10:16	Christopher Magtoto (GUM)	10:20	Jeofry Limtiaco (GUM)	10:54
4 x 100 metres relay	New Zealand; Michael Cochrane; Rory Hofmans; Joel Armstrong; Alex Jordan	43.60	Australia; Mason Holm; Daniel McLean; Dean Searles; Linc Port	43.88		

=== Girls under 18 (Youth) ===
Event	Gold		Silver		Bronze	
100 metres (wind: -0.7m/s)	Olivia Blundell (NZL)	12.87	Pollara Cobb (GUM)	12.92	Vasi Feke (TGA)	13.05
200 metres (wind: -0.7m/s)	Paulini Korowaqa (FIJ)	25.74	Vicky Paine (NZL)	26.40	Kirsten Hurley (NZL)	27.08
400 metres	Paulini Korowaqa (FIJ)	57.81	Vicky Paine (NZL)	57.83	Kathryn Kennedy (NZL)	59.00
800 metres	Emily Kinsler (NZL)	2:19.31	Nori Tubas (VAN)	2:39.49	Kimberley Layson (GUM)	2:43.57
1500 metres	Laura Nagel (NZL)	4:39.91	Emily Kinsler (NZL)	5:04.21	Nori Tubas (VAN)	5:33.97
3000 metres	Danielle Trevis (NZL)	10:48.28	Jessie Andresen (SOL)	12:24.76	Joni Aguon (GUM)	12:34.77
100 metres hurdles (wind: -0.2m/s)	Kelsey Berryman (NZL)	14.88	Olivia Blundell (NZL)	15.03	Vasi Feke (TGA)	15.35
400 metres hurdles	Kelsey Berryman (NZL)	67.88	Emily Keehn (AUS)	74.21		
High jump	Tamara Anstis (NZL)	1.67	Emily Keehn (AUS)	1.61	Kirsten Hurley (NZL)	1.55
Long jump	Olivia Blundell (NZL)	5.08	Patricia Taea (COK)	5.02	Jacquelin Wonenberg (NMI)	4.79
Triple jump	Kathryn Kennedy (NZL)	11.07	Pollara Cobb (GUM)	10.02	Jacquelin Wonenberg (NMI)	9.66
Shot put	Margaret Satupai (SAM)	14.27	Iesha Beer (AUS)	12.71	Jenequa Benavente (NMI)	9.53
Discus throw	Margaret Satupai (SAM)	45.08	Jenequa Benavente (NMI)	33.67	Perle Buard (PYF)	32.19
Hammer throw	Margaret Satupai (SAM)	34.58	Perle Buard (PYF)	31.57	Jenequa Benavente (NMI)	27.57
Javelin throw	Perle Buard (PYF)	38.73	Tamara Anstis (NZL)	33.34	Patricia Taea (COK)	31.91
Heptathlon	Jacquelin Wonenberg (NMI)	3263	Unaloto Tauki'uvea (TGA)	3369	Li'amwar Rangamar (NMI)	2187
3.0km Cross Country	Laura Nagel (NZL)	10:49	Danielle Trevis (NZL)	11:30	Jackie Gatland (NFK)	12:06
4 x 100 metres relay	New Zealand; Kelsey Berryman; Kathryn Kennedy; Tamara Anstis; Olivia Blundell	50.76	Northern Mariana Islands; Reylynn Sapong; Jacquelin Wonenberg; Ana Tenario; Li'amwar Rangamar	56.90		

=== Mixed ===
Event	Gold		Silver		Bronze	
800 metres Medley relay (100m x 100m x 200m x 400m)	Australia; Emma-Rose Daby; Mason Holm; Emily Keehn; Daniel McLean	1:42.14	Papua New Guinea; Monica Pokana; Reginald Worealevi; Shirley Vunatup; Joe Matmat	1:43.07	Guam; Pollara Cobb; Aldrin Zapanta; Noreen Ericsson; Matthew Pangelinan	1:47.48

== Medal table (unofficial) ==
* Host nation (Northern Mariana Islands)

Rank	Nation	Gold	Silver	Bronze	Total
1	New Zealand	19	11	6	36
2	Samoa	5	0	0	5
3	Australia	3	8	2	13
4	French Polynesia	2	1	2	5
5	Fiji	2	0	0	2
6	Tonga	1	4	2	7
7	Guam	1	3	7	11
7	Northern Mariana Islands*	1	3	7	11
9	Cook Islands	1	2	3	6
10	Solomon Islands	1	2	0	3
11	/New Caledonia	1	0	0	1
12	Papua New Guinea	0	1	1	2
12	Vanuatu	0	1	1	2
14	Palau	0	1	0	1
15	Kiribati	0	0	1	1
15	Norfolk Island	0	0	1	1
Totals (16 entries)		37	37	33	107

== Participation (unofficial) ==
An unofficial count yields the number of about 112 athletes from 21 countries:

- American Samoa (6)
- Australia (12)
- Cook Islands (4)
- Fiji (1)
- French Polynesia (3)
- Guam (15)
- Kiribati (1)
- Marshall Islands (4)
- Federated States of Micronesia (1)
- Nauru (4)
- /New Caledonia (1)
- New Zealand (18)
- Norfolk Island (2)
- Northern Mariana Islands (14)
- Palau (4)
- Papua New Guinea (6)
- Samoa (3)
- Solomon Islands (4)
- Tonga (4)
- Tuvalu (3)
- Vanuatu (2)
