= Margaret Satupai =

Samoan athlete (born 1992)

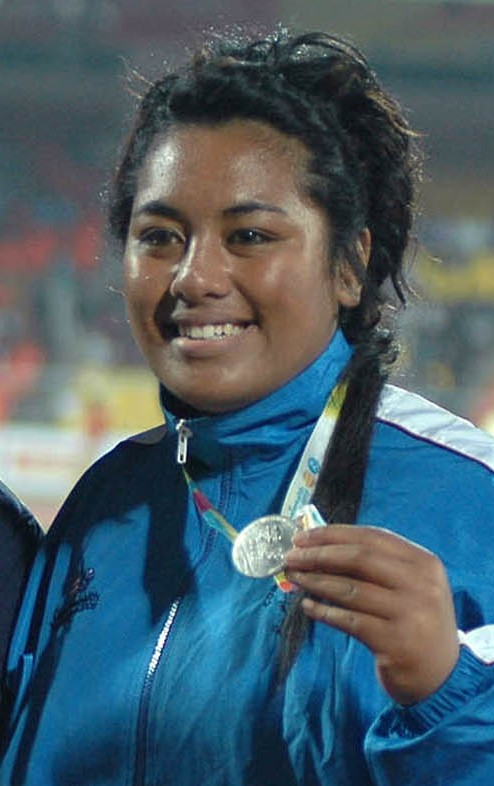
- Saputai as silver medallist at Commonwealth Youth Games in 2008

Personal information
- Full name: Tasele Margaret Iva Satupai
- National team: Samoa
- Citizenship: Samoa
- Born: 9 July 1992 (age 33)

Sport
- Sport: Shot put; discus
Medal record
Shot put
Commonwealth Games
Bronze medal – third place	2010 Delhi	Shot put
World Youth Championships
Silver medal – second place	2009 Brixen	Shot put
Pacific Games
Gold medal – first place	2011 Noumea	Discus
Silver medal – second place	2011 Noumea	Shot put
Silver medal – second place	2011 Noumea	Hammer
Bronze medal – third place	2007 Apia	Shot put
Pacific Mini Games
Silver medal – second place	2009 Rarotonga	Shot put
Silver medal – second place	2009 Rarotonga	Discus
Oceania Championships
Gold medal – first place	2008 Saipan	Shot put
Gold medal – first place	2010 Cairns	Shot put
Silver medal – second place	2008 Saipan	Discus
Silver medal – second place	2010 Cairns	Discus
Bronze medal – third place	2008 Saipan	Hammer
Oceania Youth Championships
Gold medal – first place	2008 Saipan	Shot put
Gold medal – first place	2008 Saipan	Discus
Gold medal – first place	2008 Saipan	Hammer

Margaret Satupai (born 9 July 1992) is a Samoan athlete, who holds the Samoan records in shotput and discus and won a bronze medal for shot put in the 2010 Commonwealth Games.

== Biography ==
Tasele Margaret Iva Satupai was born on 9 July 1992. She grew up in Melbourne where she trained with Oakleigh Little Athletics. She began her international career with an unsuccessful performance at the Junior World Championships in Bydgoszcz in 2008. A year later she was fourth in the discus throw and second in the shot put at the Junior World Championships. She achieved great success in 2010. She achieved high positions at the Junior World Championships and won two medals in the Australian and Oceania Championships. At the end of the season 2010 she was third in the shot put at the Commonwealth Games, winning a bronze medal.

== International achievements ==
During her career she repeatedly improved Samoan records across age categories and, as of 2021, both her discus and shot put distances were still unbeaten. Her record-breaking shot put throw of 16.43m was made at the Commonwealth Games in 2010; her discus throw of 52.67m was made at the Australian Junior Championships in 2011.

Year	Competition	Venue	Position	Event	Notes
Representing the Samoa
2007	South Pacific Games	Apia, Samoa	3rd	Shot put	13.60 m
2007	South Pacific Games	Apia, Samoa	6th	Discus	42.86 m
2008	Oceania Youth Championships	Saipan, Northern Mariana Islands	1st	Shot put	14.27 m
2008	Oceania Youth Championships	Saipan, Northern Mariana Islands	1st	Discus	45.08 m
2008	Oceania Youth Championships	Saipan, Northern Mariana Islands	1st	Hammer throw	34.58 m
2008	Oceania Championships	Saipan, Northern Mariana Islands	1st	Shot put	13.94 m
2008	Oceania Championships	Saipan, Northern Mariana Islands	2nd	Discus	46.57 m
2008	Oceania Championships	Saipan, Northern Mariana Islands	3rd	Hammer throw	36.11 m
2008	World Junior Championships	Bydgoszcz, Poland	21st	Shot put	14.54 m
2009	World Youth Championships	Brixen, Italy	2nd	Shot put	14.96 m
2009	World Youth Championships	Brixen, Italy	4th	Discus	49.06 m
2009	Pacific Mini Games	Rarotonga, Cook Islands	2nd	Shot put	14.52 m
2009	Pacific Mini Games	Rarotonga, Cook Islands	2nd	Discus	50.94 m
2009	Pacific Mini Games	Rarotonga, Cook Islands	5th	Hammer throw	38.67 m
2010	Oceania Junior Championships	Cairns, Australia	1st	Shot put	16.34 m
2010	Oceania Championships	Cairns, Australia	1st	Shot put	15.95 m
2010	Oceania Championships	Cairns, Australia	2nd	Discus	51.42 m
2010	World Junior Championships	Moncton, Canada	4th	Shot put	15.62 m
2010	World Junior Championships	Moncton, Canada	7th	Discus	51.31 m
2010	Commonwealth Games	Delhi, India	3rd	Shot put	16.43 m
2011	Pacific Games	Nouméa, New Caledonia	2nd	Shot put	15.12 m
2011	Pacific Games	Nouméa, New Caledonia	1st	Discus	52.05 m
2011	Pacific Games	Nouméa, New Caledonia	2nd	Hammer throw	49.71 m
