= Ameer Shakir =

Iraqi hurdler

Ameer Shaker Aneed
Personal information
- Born: 8 October 1989 (age 36)

Sport
- Sport: Athletics
- Event: 110 m hurdles
- Club: Råby-Rekarne FI (–2006, 2011–2015); Eskilstuna FI (2006–2011); Hammarby IF (2015–)

Ameer Shaker Aneed (born 8 October 1989) is an Iraqi athlete specialising in the sprint hurdles. He competed at the 2014 World Indoor Championships. In addition, he won a shared gold medal at the 2013 Islamic Solidarity Games.

His personal bests are 13.80 seconds in the 110 metres hurdles (+0.8 m/s, Sundsvall 2013) and 7.77 seconds in the 60 metres hurdles (Malmö 2016).

== International competitions ==
Year	Competition	Venue	Position	Event	Notes
Representing Sweden
2008	World Junior Championships	Bydgoszcz, Poland	50th (h)	110 m hurdles (99 cm)	14.66
Representing Iraq
2013	Asian Championships	Pune, India	6th	110 m hurdles	25.05
2013	Islamic Solidarity Games	Palembang, Indonesia	1st	110 m hurdles	13.89
2014	Asian Indoor Championships	Hangzhou, China	7th (h)	60 m hurdles	8.22^{1}
2014	World Indoor Championships	Sopot, Poland	26th (h)	60 m hurdles	7.96
2014	Asian Games	Incheon, South Korea	10th (h)	110 m hurdles	13.91
2016	Asian Indoor Championships	Doha, Qatar	6th (h)	60 m hurdles	7.90^{2}

^{1}Did not start in the final
^{2}Did not finish in the final
