= Athletics at the 2007 Pan American Games – Women's discus throw =

Women's discus throw at the Pan American Games

The women's discus throw event at the 2007 Pan American Games was held on July 23.

== Results ==
Rank	Athlete	Nationality	#1	#2	#3	#4	#5	#6	Result	Notes
1st place, gold medalist(s)	Yarelis Barrios	Cuba	x	61.50	x	61.72	x	60.33	61.72	
2nd place, silver medalist(s)	Yania Ferrales	Cuba	x	57.33	58.18	61.71	58.80	57.41	61.71	
3rd place, bronze medalist(s)	Elisângela Adriano	Brazil	56.73	58.55	59.07	59.08	60.27	x	60.27	SB
4	Suzanne Powell-Roos	United States	51.81	58.73	x	57.53	59.08	58.81	59.08	
5	Summer Pierson	United States	53.16	x	x	54.29	56.03	55.90	56.03	
6	Dayana Octavien	Haiti	x	53.66	x	x	x	x	53.66	
7	Annie Alexander	Trinidad and Tobago	51.52	48.10	47.57	x	43.75	48.42	51.52	
8	Renata de Figueirêdo	Brazil	50.23	49.32	47.91	49.15	x	48.31	50.23	
9	Rocío Comba	Argentina	48.78	x	47.35				48.78	
10	Keisha Walkes	Barbados	48.51	x	48.41				48.51	
11	Shernelle Nicholls	Barbados	43.89	45.38	46.28				46.28	
12	Karen Gallardo	Chile	43.34	42.19	46.11				46.11	
13	Ximena Araneda	Chile	41.11	45.64	x				45.64	
	Joeane Jadotte	Haiti	x	x	x				NM	
