= 2015 European Athletics U23 Championships – Women's shot put =

The women's shot put event at the 2015 European Athletics U23 Championships was held in Tallinn, Estonia, at Kadriorg Stadium on 9 July.

== Medalists ==
Gold	Viktoryia Kolb; Belarus
Silver	Shanice Craft; Germany
Bronze	Sara Gambetta; Germany

== Results ==
=== Final ===
9 July

Rank	Name	Nationality	Attempts						Result	Notes
Rank	Name	Nationality	1	2	3	4	5	6	Result	Notes
1st place, gold medalist(s)	Viktoryia Kolb	Belarus	17.02	x	16.60	x	16.39	17.47	17.47	PB
2nd place, silver medalist(s)	Shanice Craft	Germany	15.08	17.19	16.42	17.06	16.34	17.29	17.29	SB
3rd place, bronze medalist(s)	Sara Gambetta	Germany	x	16.68	16.28	16.99	16.22	x	16.99	PB
4	Fanny Roos	Sweden	16.59	x	16.31	16.73	16.48	16.14	16.73	
5	Anna Wloka	Poland	16.43	16.32	x	16.25	x	16.59	16.59	SB
6	Jolien Boumkwo	Belgium	15.91	x	x	16.40	15.62	16.47	16.47	NUR PB
7	Angelika Kalinowska	Poland	14.50	14.73	15.85	x	16.26	x	16.26	PB
8	Kätlin Piirimäe	Estonia	15.69	16.04	x	x	16.00	x	16.04	
9	Sophie McKinna	United Kingdom	15.17	15.17	15.68				15.68	
10	María Belén Toimil	Spain	15.66	x	15.34				15.66	
11	Natalya Troneva	Russia	x	15.35	14.85				15.35	
12	Raisa Blinova	Russia	x	15.21	x				15.21	

=== Qualifications ===
9 July

Rank	Name	Nationality	Attempts			Result	Notes
Rank	Name	Nationality	1	2	3	Result	Notes
1	Sara Gambetta	Germany	16.71			16.71	Q
2	Fanny Roos	Sweden	16.59			16.59	Q
3	Anna Wloka	Poland	16.43			16.43	SB Q
4	Viktoryia Kolb	Belarus	15.68	16.43		16.43	Q
5	Natalya Troneva	Russia	15.33	15.38	16.04	16.04	q
6	María Belén Toimil	Spain	15.90	15.31	15.68	15.90	q
7	Shanice Craft	Germany	15.87	15.84	15.58	15.87	q
8	Sophie McKinna	United Kingdom	14.88	14.49	15.74	15.74	q
9	Kätlin Piirimäe	Estonia	15.68	14.80	15.52	15.68	q
10	Raisa Blinova	Russia	15.25	13.31	15.52	15.52	q
11	Jolien Boumkwo	Belgium	15.35	15.49	x	15.49	q
12	Angelika Kalinowska	Poland	15.37	15.00	15.41	15.41	q
13	Laura Gedminaitė	Lithuania	14.85	15.03	15.23	15.23	
14	Stamatía Skarvéli	Greece	x	15.13	x	15.13	
15	Andreea Huzum-Vitan	Romania	x	14.96	14.98	14.98	
16	Dimitriana Surdu	Moldova	13.83	13.53	14.77	14.77	
17	Dilek Özada	Turkey	12.70	14.33	14.24	14.33	
18	Svitlana Marusenko	Ukraine	13.77	13.93	14.19	14.19	
19	Linda Ozola	Latvia	x	x	14.14	14.14	
20	Sare Bostanci	Turkey	x	13.63	13.86	13.86	
21	Gabriela Pallová	Czech Republic	13.34	x	13.69	13.69	
22	Monia Cantarella	Italy	13.58	x	11.77	13.58	
23	Tara Tuominen	Finland	13.33	13.30	13.38	13.38	

== Participation ==
According to an unofficial count, 23 athletes from 19 countries participated in the event.

- Belarus (1)
- Belgium (1)
- Czech Republic (1)
- Estonia (1)
- Finland (1)
- Germany (2)
- Greece (1)
- Italy (1)
- Latvia (1)
- Lithuania (1)
- Moldova (1)
- Poland (2)
- Romania (1)
- Russia (2)
- Spain (1)
- Sweden (1)
- Turkey (2)
- Ukraine (1)
- United Kingdom (1)
