= Kachnar Chaudhary =

Indian shot putter

Personal information
- Nationality: Indian
- Born: 17 May 1999 (age 27) Rajasthan India

Sport
- Country: India
- Sport: Shot put
- Event: Athletics

Achievements and titles
- Regional finals: Indian
Medal record
Women's athletics
Representing India
South Asian Games
Bronze medal – third place	2019	Shot put
- Updated on August 2025

Kachnar Chaudhary is an Indian track and field athlete and police inspector who specializes in shot put. In 2016, she set the national record for under-18 girls in shot put. Chaudhary has represented India in several competitions, including the 2017 Summer Universiade in Taipei and the 2019 South Asian Games, where she won a bronze medal. Chaudhary's personal best is 14.55 meters with a 4 kg shot and 13.99 meters with a 3 kg shot.
