= Johnathan Cabral =

American-Canadian hurdler

- Cabral at the 2016 Prefontaine Classic in Eugene, Oregon

Personal information
- Born: 31 December 1992 (age 33) Northridge, California, United States

Sport
- Sport: Track and field

Johnathan Knight Cabral (born December 31, 1992) is an American-Canadian hurdler. He grew up in Agoura Hills, California and competed for the Agoura High School football team and track and field team. He attended the University of Oregon where he competed as a member of the track and field team.

== Personal ==
Born in Northridge, California he has Portuguese ancestry on his father's side, Cabral grew up in Agoura Hills, California and graduated from Agoura High School in 2011. His hurdle coach since he was eight years old was his father, John Cabral, who encouraged him to try hurdles in youth track. Throughout his time at Agoura High School, where he currently holds both the 110- and 300-meter hurdle records his father held the position of head hurdle coach. He has one younger sister Jontelle and his mother, Ghislaine Cabral née Côté, is a massage therapist and native of Péribonka, Quebec. At age of eight his father and mother divorced.

== High school track and field career ==
=== Freshman year ===
During 2008 at Agoura High School, Johnathan Cabral was running the 110 meter hurdles. He was also introduced to the 300 meter hurdles by head coach Tracy Spencer.

=== Sophomore year ===
During the 2009 CIF Southern Section Finals, Cabral ran the 10th fastest 110-meter hurdle time in the state that year with a time of 14.15 seconds. He qualified for the CIF State Prelims where he was disqualified for falling and interfering with another competitor.

=== Junior year ===
Cabral was ranked third in the nation in the 110-meter hurdles during 2010. His personal record that season was 13.54 wind-aided at the CIF State Championships. His fastest wind-legal time was 13.63 seconds at the Junior World Championships (representing the United States). He was the California State Champion in the 110-meter hurdles with his time of 13.54, and earned 5th place in the 300-meter hurdles with a time of 37.57.

=== Senior year ===
Cabral finished his senior year as the national leader in both the 110 and 300-meter hurdles. He posted times of 13.43 in the 110-meter hurdles and 36.42 in the 300-meter hurdles at Arcadia Invitational, setting two new meet records and the fastest combined hurdles performance in meet history. The following week he broke the Mt. SAC Relays 110-meter high school meet record with a time of 13.48 seconds. His 110-meter personal best was posted at the CIF Southern Section Masters meet with a wind-aided time of 13.27 seconds. The time did not break Chris Nelloms' U.S. 110-meter national record of 13.30 due to the wind illegality. Nevertheless, he qualified for the CIF California State Meet where he won in both the 110-meter and 300-meter hurdles with times of 13.79 and 36.20 respectively.

His state wins qualified him to compete in the U.S. Junior Track and Field National Championships where he ran his fastest wind-legal time of 13.36 in the Men's 110-meter Junior Prelims. During the Men's 110-meter Junior Finals, Cabral hit the 10th hurdle and fell, ultimately crossing the finish line in 7th with a time of 14.36. Unable to compete for USA at the 2011 Pan American Games, Cabral attended the Canadian Junior Championships in Winnipeg, MB which served as the Pan American Junior Trials. He posted the top time in the 110-meter preliminaries with a time of 13.43 seconds, but was determined ineligible to compete in the finals despite his Canadian citizenship status. Nevertheless, his time broke the previous Canadian National Record of 13.72. Still pursuing the 110-meter national record of 13.30, Cabral competed in the Golden West Invitational and won both hurdle events with a time of 13.41 in the 110-meter hurdles and his fastest 300-meter hurdle time of 35.76.

== College ==
=== Freshman year ===
As a freshman, Cabral earned Pac-12 Newcomer of the Year honors in the 2011-12 season. He made appearances at the Pac-12 Championships, NCAA National Championships, and US Olympic Trials. He placed 11th at the National Championships earning him 2nd team All-American honors. His outdoor season best came at the NCAA West Preliminary Rounds in Austin, Texas (5/26/12) where he ran the 110 Meter Hurdles in 13.45. His indoor season was also successful as he ran a seasonal best 7.83 at the MPSF Championships. That was the third fastest time in school history.

=== Sophomore year ===
As a sophomore, Cabral earned his 2nd consecutive All-American honor, placing 5th at the NCAA National Championships. He earned a personal best during his win at the Texas relays, running 13.33. He continued his indoor success while placing 6th at the NCAA Indoor Championships, running a 7.72 in the prelims and a 7.73 in the finals. Johnathan Cabral finished 2nd in the Canadian National Championships which earned him a spot at the Pan Am Games in Toronto.

=== Junior year ===
As a junior, Cabral placed 4th in the NCAA Indoor Championships with a time of 7.65, good for a PR and a school record. His outdoor season was marred by injury. He qualified for the NCAA Championships after finishing second in the semifinal of the West Regionals and received NCAA All-America honorable mention after failing to finish due to injury.

=== Senior year ===
His senior year, he opened his outdoor season with back-to-back wins at the Pepsi Team Invitational and Oregon Twilight meets. He then finished his season with a 2nd-place finish in the 110H in the NCAA Division I Outdoor Track and Field Championships with a time of 13.22w.

== Professional career ==
=== Bang Out Track Club ===
In June 2015, Johnathan Cabral joined Bang Out Track Club, a running club based in Davis, CA. Cabral competed in the Bang Out jersey for the majority of the 2016 season. He earned victories at the MT. Sac Relays and Canadian National Championships while competing for Bang Out TC.

=== 2016 Olympics ===
In July 2016, he was named to Canada's Olympic team. He qualified for the Olympic final of the event and ultimately placed 6th.
