= 2017 European Athletics Indoor Championships – Women's shot put =

The women's shot put event at the 2017 European Athletics Indoor Championships was held on 3 March 2015 at 10:50 (qualification) and at 17:35 (final) local time.

== Medalists ==
Gold	Silver	Bronze
Anita Márton; Hungary	Radoslava Mavrodieva; Bulgaria	Yuliya Leantsiuk; Belarus

== Records ==
Standing records prior to the 2013 European Athletics Indoor Championships
World record	Helena Fibingerová (TCH)	22.50	Jablonec, Czechoslovakia	19 February 1977
European record	Helena Fibingerová (TCH)	22.50	Jablonec, Czechoslovakia	19 February 1977
Championship record	Helena Fibingerová (TCH)	21.46	San Sebastián, Spain	13 March 1977
World Leading	Raven Saunders (USA)	19.10	Nashville, United States	14 January 2017
European Leading	Anita Márton (HUN)	18.97	Nashville, United States	24 February 2017

== Results ==
=== Qualification ===
Qualification: Qualifying performance 17.70 (Q) or at least 8 best performers (q) advance to the Final.

Rank	Athlete	Nationality	#1	#2	#3	Result	Note
1	Anita Márton	Hungary	17.66	17.67	18.44	18.44	Q
2	Aliona Dubitskaya	Belarus	17.38	18.13		18.13	Q, SB
3	Claudine Vita	Germany	16.16	17.83		17.83	Q, PB
4	Yuliya Leantsiuk	Belarus	17.81			17.81	
5	Fanny Roos	Sweden	17.44	17.69	17.76	17.76	Q
6	Jessica Cérival	France	x	17.24	17.76	17.76	Q, SB
7	Radoslava Mavrodieva	Bulgaria	17.33	17.47	17.70	17.70	Q
8	Paulina Guba	Poland	x	17.30	17.62	17.62	q
9	Austra Skujytė	Lithuania	16.98	16.57	17.37	17.37	SB
10	Rachel Wallader	Great Britain	17.20	16.99	17.35	17.35	
11	Viktoryia Kolb	Belarus	16.99	17.22	16.87	17.22	
12	Melissa Boekelman	Netherlands	17.19	17.02	16.97	17.19	
13	Emel Dereli	Turkey	17.10	16.99	16.75	17.10	
14	Alina Kenzel	Germany	16.97	16.86	x	16.97	
15	Dimitriana Surdu	Moldova	x	16.78	x	16.78	
16	Kätlin Piirimäe	Estonia	14.91	16.02	16.29	16.29	SB
17	Agnieszka Maluśkiewicz	Poland	16.15	x	x	16.15	
17	Úrsula Ruiz	Spain	x	x	16.15	16.15	
19	Olha Holodna	Ukraine	x	16.06	x	16.06	
20	Giedrė Kupstytė	Lithuania	x	15.34	16.00	16.00	
21	Lenuţa Burueana	Romania	15.17	x	15.45	15.45	

=== Final ===
Rank	Athlete	Nationality	#1	#2	#3	#4	#5	#6	Result	Note
1st place, gold medalist(s)	Anita Márton	Hungary	18.67	18.96	19.24	x	18.46	19.28	19.28	WL
2nd place, silver medalist(s)	Radoslava Mavrodieva	Bulgaria	17.96	17.82	18.36	x	18.16	18.08	18.36	PB
3rd place, bronze medalist(s)	Yuliya Leantsiuk	Belarus	17.66	17.94	18.32	17.90	18.08	17.93	18.32	
4	Fanny Roos	Sweden	17.54	17.88	18.13	17.57	17.71	17.73	18.13	=NR
5	Claudine Vita	Germany	18.09	17.68	17.98	18.01	17.69	17.55	18.09	PB
6	Paulina Guba	Poland	17.55	17.85	18.00	x	x	x	18.00	SB
7	Aliona Dubitskaya	Belarus	x	17.85	17.76	x	17.81	x	17.85	
8	Jessica Cérival	France	16.25	16.52	16.84	x	x	x	16.84	
