= 2013 European Athletics U23 Championships – Women's shot put =

The Women's shot put event at the 2013 European Athletics U23 Championships was held in Tampere, Finland, at Ratina Stadium on 12 July.

== Medalists ==
Gold	Olha Holodna; Ukraine
Silver	Shanice Craft; Germany
Bronze	Lena Urbaniak; Germany

== Results ==
=== Final ===
12 July 2013

Rank	Name	Nationality	Attempts						Result	Notes
Rank	Name	Nationality	1	2	3	4	5	6	Result	Notes
1st place, gold medalist(s)	Olha Holodna	Ukraine	17.69	18.11	x	17.00	17.34	x	18.11	PB
2nd place, silver medalist(s)	Shanice Craft	Germany	16.16	16.15	17.29	x	16.86	x	17.29	PB
3rd place, bronze medalist(s)	Lena Urbaniak	Germany	16.86	16.66	16.19	16.15	16.96	16.98	16.98	
4	Valentina Mužarić	Croatia	16.70	16.35	x	x	16.02	x	16.70	
5	Paulina Guba	Poland	16.57	x	16.48	x	x	16.11	16.57	
6	Magdalena Żebrowska	Poland	15.62	16.03	15.95	15.32	15.88	16.38	16.38	PB
7	Anna Wloka	Poland	15.22	16.35	15.68	16.13	16.21	16.35	16.35	
8	Sara Gambetta	Germany	14.14	16.15	16.21	15.93	15.91	x	16.21	
9	Natalya Troneva	Russia	x	15.97	x				15.97	
10	Helena Perez	France	x	14.96	15.92				15.92	
11	Fabienne Digard	France	15.28	x	15.77				15.77	
12	Annastasia Muchkaev	Israel	15.12	15.39	x				15.39	

=== Qualifications ===
Qualified: qualifying perf. 16.00 (Q) or 12 best performers (q) advance to the Final

==== Summary ====
Rank	Name	Nationality	Result	Notes
1	Shanice Craft	Germany	17.10	Q
2	Olha Holodna	Ukraine	16.84	Q
3	Valentina Mužarić	Croatia	16.80	Q
4	Fabienne Digard	France	16.57	Q PB
5	Sara Gambetta	Germany	16.30	Q
6	Helena Perez	France	16.29	Q
7	Lena Urbaniak	Germany	16.16	Q
8	Paulina Guba	Poland	16.08	Q
9	Natalya Troneva	Russia	16.08	Q
10	Anna Wloka	Poland	15.92	q
11	Magdalena Żebrowska	Poland	15.82	q
12	Annastasia Muchkaev	Israel	15.34	q
13	Laura Gedminaitė	Lithuania	15.24	PB
14	Jolien Boumkwo	Belgium	15.21	
15	Andreea Huzum-Vitan	Romania	15.03	
16	Corinne Nugter	Netherlands	15.01	
17	Pamela Kiel	Netherlands	14.85	
18	Francesca Stevanato	Italy	14.26	

==== Details ====
===== Group A =====
12 July 2013 / 11:30

Rank	Name	Nationality	Attempts			Result	Notes
Rank	Name	Nationality	1	2	3	Result	Notes
1	Valentina Mužarić	Croatia	x	16.80		16.80	Q
2	Fabienne Digard	France	15.80	15.78	16.57	16.57	Q PB
3	Sara Gambetta	Germany	15.77	16.30		16.30	Q
4	Lena Urbaniak	Germany	x	16.16		16.16	Q
5	Natalya Troneva	Russia	16.08			16.08	Q
6	Anna Wloka	Poland	15.38	15.92	15.20	15.92	q
7	Laura Gedminaitė	Lithuania	14.22	15.24	x	15.24	PB
8	Pamela Kiel	Netherlands	14.47	14.61	14.85	14.85	
9	Francesca Stevanato	Italy	14.26	x	13.98	14.26	

===== Group B =====
12 July 2013 / 11:30

Rank	Name	Nationality	Attempts			Result	Notes
Rank	Name	Nationality	1	2	3	Result	Notes
1	Shanice Craft	Germany	15.44	17.10		17.10	Q
2	Olha Holodna	Ukraine	16.84			16.84	Q
3	Helena Perez	France	15.03	16.29		16.29	Q
4	Paulina Guba	Poland	15.71	16.08		16.08	Q
5	Magdalena Żebrowska	Poland	15.36	15.82	15.82	15.82	q
6	Annastasia Muchkaev	Israel	15.34	14.97	x	15.34	q
7	Jolien Boumkwo	Belgium	14.87	15.21	14.89	15.21	
8	Andreea Huzum-Vitan	Romania	15.03	14.10	14.71	15.03	
9	Corinne Nugter	Netherlands	15.01	14.70	14.69	15.01	

== Participation ==
According to an unofficial count, 18 athletes from 12 countries participated in the event.

- Belgium (1)
- Croatia (1)
- France (2)
- Germany (3)
- Israel (1)
- Italy (1)
- Lithuania (1)
- Netherlands (2)
- Poland (3)
- Romania (1)
- Russia (1)
- Ukraine (1)
