= Bian Ka =

Chinese shot putter

Personal information
- Born: 5 January 1993 (age 33)
- Height: 1.82 m (6 ft 0 in)
- Weight: 118 kg (260 lb)

Sport
- Sport: Track and field
- Event: Shot put
Medal record
Women's athletics
Representing China
Asian Indoor Championships
Silver medal – second place	2014 Hangzhou	Shot put

Bian Ka (卞卡, born 5 January 1993) is a Chinese athlete specialising in the shot put. She represented her country at the 2016 World Indoor Championships finishing tenth.

Her personal bests in the event are 18.71 metres outdoors (Suzhou 2015) and 18.12 metres indoors (Beijing 2016).

== Competition record ==
Year	Competition	Venue	Position	Event	Notes
Representing China
2012	World Junior Championships	Barcelona, Spain	3rd	Shot put	16.48 m
2014	Asian Indoor Championships	Hangzhou, China	2nd	Shot put	16.60 m
2015	Asian Championships	Wuhan, China	3rd	Shot put	17.78 m
2016	World Indoor Championships	Portland, United States	10th	Shot put	17.34 m
2016	Olympic Games	Rio de Janeiro, Brazil	16th (q)	Shot put	17.68 m
2017	World Championships	London, United Kingdom	12th	Shot put	17.60 m
2017	Asian Indoor and Martial Arts Games	Ashgabat, Turkmenistan	1st	Shot put	17.34 m
