= Athletics at the 2015 Summer Universiade – Women's shot put =

The women's shot put event at the 2015 Summer Universiade was held on 8 July at the Gwangju Universiade Main Stadium.

The winning margin was 6 cm, which as of 2024 remains the narrowest winning margin in the women's shot put at these games.

== Results ==
Rank	Athlete	Nationality	#1	#2	#3	#4	#5	#6	Result	Notes
1st place, gold medalist(s)	Lena Urbaniak	Germany	17.32	18.00	x	17.23	x	x	18.00	PB
2nd place, silver medalist(s)	Paulina Guba	Poland	17.37	17.34	17.94	17.29	x	17.68	17.94	PB
3rd place, bronze medalist(s)	Brittany Crew	Canada	16.09	16.16	12.42	17.27	15.77	x	17.27	PB
4	Vera Kunova	Russia	16.06	16.38	16.46	16.80	16.19	16.10	16.80	
5	Irina Kirichenko	Russia	16.43	16.41	x	16.32	16.11	x	16.43	
6	Manpreet Kaur	India	15.76	15.51	15.54	14.67	14.97	15.08	15.76	PB
7	TeRina Keenan	New Zealand	14.36	15.25	x	x	15.39	x	15.39	SB
8	Giedrė Kupstytė	Lithuania	15.06	15.29	15.31	15.12	x	x	15.31	
9	Torie Owers	New Zealand	13.54	x	14.78				14.78	
10	Alex Porlier-Langlois	Canada	14.73	x	x				14.73	
11	Ashlie Blake	United States	12.46	12.95	13.13				13.13	
12	Gloria Hinestroza	Colombia	11.84	12.08	x				12.08	
13	Rawan Bachrouch	Lebanon	x	x	5.98				5.98	
