= Lena Urbaniak =

German shot putter

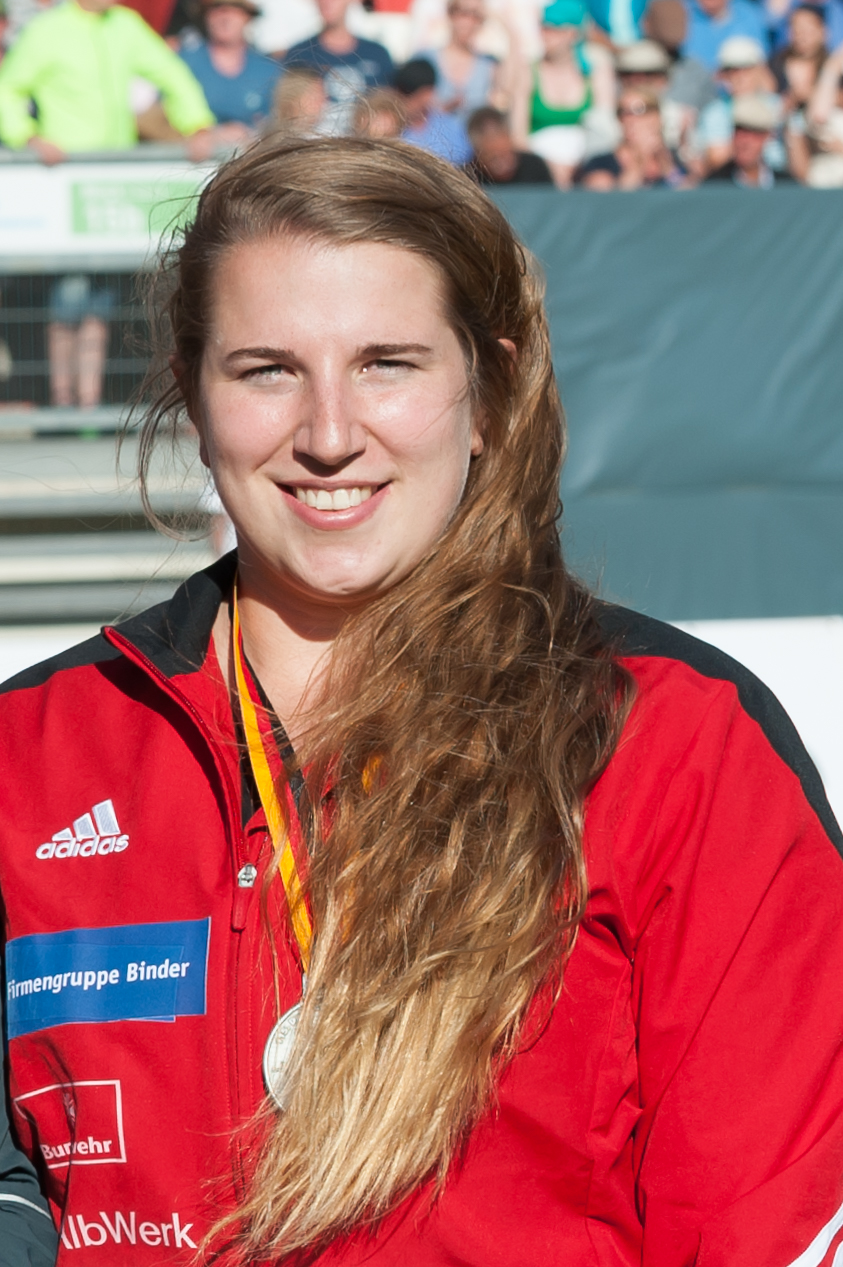
- Urbaniak in 2015

Personal information
- Born: 31 October 1992 (age 33) Schwäbisch Gmünd, Germany
- Education: Hochschule Ansbach; Ansbach University of Applied Sciences
- Height: 174 cm (5 ft 9 in)
- Weight: 92 kg (203 lb)

Sport
- Country: Germany
- Sport: Track and field
- Event: Shot put
- Club: LG Filstal
- Coached by: Peter Salzer

Lena Urbaniak (born 31 October 1992 in Schwäbisch Gmünd) is a German athlete specialising in the shot put. She won the gold medal at the 2015 Summer Universiade.

Her personal bests in the event are 18.02 metres outdoors (Kassel 2016) and 18.32 metres indoors (Karlsruhe 2016).

In her youth, she also competed in gymnastics, handball and karate.

== Competition record ==
| Year | Competition | Venue | Position | Event | Notes |
Representing Germany
| 2009 | World Youth Championships | Brixen, Italy | 1st | Shot put | 15.28 m |
| 2009 | World Youth Championships | Brixen, Italy | 6th | Discus throw | 48.56 m |
| 2010 | World Junior Championships | Moncton, Canada | 10th | Shot put | 15.09 m |
| 2011 | European Junior Championships | Tallinn, Estonia | 1st | Shot put | 16.31 m |
| 2013 | European U23 Championships | Tampere, Finland | 3rd | Shot put | 16.98 m |
| 2014 | European Championships | Zürich, Switzerland | 8th | Shot put | 17.77 m |
| 2015 | European Indoor Championships | Prague, Czech Republic | 11th (q) | Shot put | 16.49 m |
| 2015 | Universiade | Gwangju, South Korea | 1st | Shot put | 18.00 m |
| 2016 | World Indoor Championships | Portland, United States | 7th | Shot put | 17.91 m |
| 2016 | European Championships | Amsterdam, Netherlands | 13th (q) | Shot put | 16.83 m |
| 2016 | Olympic Games | Rio de Janeiro, Brazil | 30th (q) | Shot put | 16.62 m |
| 2017 | Universiade | Taipei, Taiwan | 7th | Shot put | 16.72 m |
