= 2010 World Junior Championships in Athletics – Women's shot put =

Athletic event

The women's shot put event at the 2010 World Junior Championships in Athletics was held in Moncton, New Brunswick, Canada, at Moncton Stadium on 20 July.

== Medalists ==
| Gold | Meng Qianqian; China |
| Silver | Cui Shuang; China |
| Bronze | Evgeniya Smirnova; Russia |

== Results ==
=== Final ===
20 July

| Rank | Name | Nationality | Attempts | | | | | | Result | Notes |
| Rank | Name | Nationality | 1 | 2 | 3 | 4 | 5 | 6 | Result | Notes |
|---|---|---|---|---|---|---|---|---|---|---|
| 1st place, gold medalist(s) | Meng Qianqian | China | 16.94 | 16.77 | x | 16.56 | x | x | 16.94 | |
| 2nd place, silver medalist(s) | Cui Shuang | China | x | 15.69 | 16.13 | x | 15.50 | 15.49 | 16.13 | |
| 3rd place, bronze medalist(s) | Evgeniya Smirnova | Russia | 15.19 | 15.40 | x | 15.22 | 15.40 | 15.75 | 15.75 | |
| 4 | Margaret Satupai | Samoa | x | 15.13 | 15.38 | 14.41 | 15.62 | 15.35 | 15.62 | |
| 5 | Pamela Kiel | Netherlands | 15.19 | 15.40 | 14.45 | 15.53 | 15.27 | 15.56 | 15.56 | |
| 6 | Brittany Smith | United States | 15.47 | x | 14.29 | 14.43 | 14.71 | 15.01 | 15.47 | |
| 7 | Paulina Guba | Poland | 14.36 | 15.20 | x | x | 15.16 | x | 15.20 | |
| 8 | Olga Holodnaya | Ukraine | 15.17 | 14.55 | 15.05 | | | | 15.17 | |
| 9 | Magdalena Zebrowska | Poland | 14.79 | 15.10 | 14.76 | | | | 15.10 | |
| 10 | Lena Urbaniak | Germany | 15.09 | 14.89 | x | | | | 15.09 | |
| 11 | Kristin Zaumsegel | Germany | 14.32 | 14.76 | 14.56 | | | | 14.76 | |
| | Geisa Arcanjo | Brazil | x | 16.36 | 17.02 | x | 16.90 | 16.50 | DQ | IAAF rule 32.2 |

=== Qualifications ===
20 July

==== Group A ====
| Rank | Name | Nationality | Attempts | | | Result | Notes |
| Rank | Name | Nationality | 1 | 2 | 3 | Result | Notes |
|---|---|---|---|---|---|---|---|
| 1 | Evgeniya Smirnova | Russia | x | 15.86 | - | 15.86 | Q |
| 2 | Cui Shuang | China | 15.52 | 15.76 | - | 15.76 | Q |
| 3 | Lena Urbaniak | Germany | 14.03 | x | 15.18 | 15.18 | q |
| 4 | Olga Holodnaya | Ukraine | 14.13 | 15.07 | x | 15.07 | q |
| 5 | Magdalena Zebrowska | Poland | 14.63 | 14.76 | 14.57 | 14.76 | q |
| 6 | Corinne Nugter | Netherlands | 14.30 | x | 14.37 | 14.37 | |
| 7 | Francesca Stevanato | Italy | 13.16 | 13.01 | 13.59 | 13.59 | |
| 8 | Ioana Iancu | Romania | 13.02 | 13.47 | 13.21 | 13.47 | |
| 9 | Rachel Roberts | United States | x | 13.28 | x | 13.28 | |
| | Geisa Arcanjo | Brazil | 16.63 | - | - | DQ | IAAF rule 32.2 Q |

==== Group B ====
| Rank | Name | Nationality | Attempts | | | Result | Notes |
| Rank | Name | Nationality | 1 | 2 | 3 | Result | Notes |
|---|---|---|---|---|---|---|---|
| 1 | Meng Qianqian | China | 16.21 | - | - | 16.21 | Q |
| 2 | Brittany Smith | United States | 15.84 | - | - | 15.84 | Q |
| 3 | Pamela Kiel | Netherlands | 15.15 | 15.48 | 15.16 | 15.48 | q |
| 4 | Paulina Guba | Poland | 15.13 | x | 15.20 | 15.20 | q |
| 5 | Kristin Zaumsegel | Germany | 14.52 | 14.83 | 14.81 | 14.83 | q |
| 6 | Margaret Satupai | Samoa | 14.79 | x | 14.73 | 14.79 | q |
| 7 | Cecilia Dzul | Mexico | 12.99 | 14.08 | 14.18 | 14.18 | |
| 8 | Fabienne Ngoma | France | 13.54 | x | 13.76 | 13.76 | |
| 9 | Marieta Kutsarova | Bulgaria | 13.43 | 13.12 | 13.54 | 13.54 | |
| 10 | Chelsea Whalen | Canada | 12.63 | 13.28 | x | 13.28 | |

== Participation ==
According to an unofficial count, 20 athletes from 15 countries participated in the event.

- Brazil (1)
- Bulgaria (1)
- Canada (1)
- China (2)
- France (1)
- Germany (2)
- Italy (1)
- Mexico (1)
- Netherlands (2)
- Poland (2)
- Romania (1)
- Russia (1)
- Samoa (1)
- Ukraine (1)
- United States (2)
