= Annie Alexander (athlete) =

Trinidad and Tobago athlete

Personal information
- Born: 28 August 1987 (age 38) Port of Spain, Trinidad and Tobago

Sport
- Sport: Track and field
- Club: Tennessee Volunteers
Medal record
Representing Trinidad and Tobago
Central American and Caribbean Games
| Silver medal – second place | 2010 Mayaguez | Discus throw |
| Bronze medal – third place | 2010 Mayaguez | Shot put |

Annie Alexander (born 28 August 1987) is a shot putter and discus thrower from Trinidad and Tobago. She won two medals at the 2010 Central American and Caribbean Games, as well as four bronze medals at the NCAA Division I Championships indoor and outdoor.

== Youth career ==
In age-specific competitions, she won medals at the 2003, 2005 and 2006 CARIFTA Games. She won three gold medals at the 2004 and 2006 Central American and Caribbean Junior Championships, one in the discus and two in the shot put. In the shot put, she finished tenth at both the 2004 and 2006 World Junior Championships.

== Collegiate career ==
She competed collegiately in the United States, at the University of Tennessee for the Tennessee Volunteers.

Competing in the NCAA Division I Championships, Alexander finished 10th in the shot put in 2008, both indoor and outdoor. She improved considerably in 2009 to win bronze medals both indoor and outdoor. The pattern repeated when she finished 9th at the 2010 NCAA Division I Indoor Championships, followed by bronze medals in both shot put and discus throw at the 2011 NCAA Division I Outdoor Championships. In 2012 she finished sixth indoor (shot put), fourth (shot put) and fifth (discus throw) outdoor.

She was later a volunteer coach for the Manhattan College Jaspers.

== International career ==
In the discus throw, Alexander finished fourth at the 2005 Central American and Caribbean Championships, fifth at the 2006 Central American and Caribbean Games, seventh at the 2007 Pan American Games, won the silver medal at the 2007 NACAC Championships, and won the bronze medals at the 2008 and 2009 Central American and Caribbean Championships, then the silver medal at the 2010 Central American and Caribbean Games, before finishing fourth at the 2011 Central American and Caribbean Championships.

She became national champion seven times between 2005 and 2012, meaning every year except for 2006.

In the shot put, Alexander finished sixth at the 2006 Central American and Caribbean Games, eleventh at the 2007 Pan American Games, won the silver medal at the 2007 NACAC Championships, finished sixth at the 2008 Central American and Caribbean Championships, fourth at the 2009 Central American and Caribbean Championships and won the bronze medals at the 2010 Central American and Caribbean Games and 2011 Central American and Caribbean Championships.

She competed at the 2009 World Championships without reaching the final. Following two years of absence from international competition, she competed in the shot put and discus throw at the 2014 Commonwealth Games, reaching the final in neither.

Her personal best throws are 17.70 metres in the shot put, achieved indoors in January 2012 in Birmingham, and 58.58 metres in the discus throw, achieved in May 2011 in Bloomington. The latter is a Trinidad and Tobago record.
