= Radoslava Mavrodieva =

Bulgarian shot putter

Personal information
- Born: 13 March 1987 (age 39) Sliven, Bulgaria
- Height: 1.78 m (5 ft 10 in)
- Weight: 86 kg (190 lb)

Sport
- Country: Bulgaria
- Sport: Athletics
- Event: Shot put
Medal record
Women's athletics
Representing Bulgaria
European Indoor Championships
Gold medal – first place	2019 Glasgow	Shot put
Silver medal – second place	2017 Belgrade	Shot put
Bronze medal – third place	2015 Prague	Shot put
- Updated on 4 March 2019

Radoslava Mavrodieva-Yankova (Bulgarian: Радослава Мавродиева-Янкова) (born 13 March 1987, in Sliven) is a Bulgarian athlete specialising in the shot put. She represented her country at the 2012 Summer Olympics failing to get a legal mark in the qualification. She won her first major medal, a bronze, at the 2015 European Indoor Championships.

She has personal bests of 18.95 metres outdoors (Stara Zagora 2018) and 19.12 metres indoors (Glasgow 2019).

Her younger sister, Zheniam, is also a shot putter.

== Competition record ==
Year	Competition	Venue	Position	Notes
Representing Bulgaria
2004	World Junior Championships	Grosseto, Italy	6th	15.79 m
2005	European Junior Championships	Kaunas, Lithuania	5th	15.72 m
2010	European Championships	Barcelona, Spain	18th (q)	15.58 m
2011	European Indoor Championships	Paris, France	12th (q)	15.24 m
2011	World Championships	Daegu, South Korea	25th (q)	15.76 m
2012	World Indoor Championships	Istanbul, Turkey	–	NM
2012	European Championships	Helsinki, Finland	6th	18.14 m
2012	Olympic Games	London, United Kingdom	–	NM
2013	European Indoor Championships	Gothenburg, Sweden	10th (q)	17.32 m
2013	World Championships	Moscow, Russia	19th (q)	17.34 m
2014	World Indoor Championships	Sopot, Poland	18th (q)	16.48 m
2014	European Championships	Zürich, Switzerland	12th	16.98 m
2015	European Indoor Championships	Prague, Czech Republic	3rd	17.83 m
2016	World Indoor Championships	Portland, United States	6th	18.00 m
2016	European Championships	Amsterdam, Netherlands	5th	18.10 m
2016	Olympic Games	Rio de Janeiro, Brazil	21st (q)	17.20 m
2017	European Indoor Championships	Belgrade, Serbia	2nd	18.36 m
2017	World Championships	London, United Kingdom	21st (q)	16.99 m
2018	World Indoor Championships	Birmingham, United Kingdom	15th	16.33 m
2018	European Championships	Berlin, Germany	6th	18.03 m
2019	European Indoor Championships	Glasgow, United Kingdom	1st	19.12 m
