= 2012 IAAF World Indoor Championships – Women's shot put =

The women's shot put at the 2012 IAAF World Indoor Championships took place March 10 at the Ataköy Athletics Arena.

== Medalists ==
Gold	Silver	Bronze
Valerie Adams; New Zealand	Michelle Carter; United States	Jillian Camarena-Williams; United States

== Records ==
Standing records prior to the 2012 IAAF World Indoor Championships
World record	Helena Fibingerová (TCH)	22.50	Jablonec, Czechoslovakia	19 February 1977
Championship record	Nadzeya Ostapchuk (BLR)	20.85	Doha, Qatar	14 March 2010
World Leading	Nadzeya Ostapchuk (BLR)	20.70	Mogilev, Belarus	10 February 2012
African record	Vivian Chukwuemeka (NGR)	18.13	Flagstaff, United States	4 February 2006
Asian record	Sui Xinmei (CHN)	21.10	Beijing, China	3 March 1990
European record	Helena Fibingerová (TCH)	22.50	Jablonec, Czechoslovakia	19 February 1977
North and Central American and Caribbean record	Jillian Camarena-Williams (USA)	19.89	Fayetteville, United States	11 February 2012
Oceanian Record	Valerie Vili (NZL)	20.49	Doha, Qatar	14 March 2010
South American record	Elisângela Adriano (BRA)	18.33	Piraeus, Greece	24 February 1999

== Qualification standards ==
Indoor
17.50

== Schedule ==
Date	Time	Round
March 10, 2012	10:05	Qualification
March 10, 2012	18:10	Final

== Results ==
=== Qualification ===
Qualification standard 18.60 m (Q) or at least best 8 qualified. 18 athletes from 14 countries participated. The qualification round started at 10:04 and ended at 10:49.

Rank	Athlete	Nationality	#1	#2	#3	Result	Notes
1	Valerie Adams	New Zealand	19.43			19.43	Q
DQ	Nadzeya Astapchuk	Belarus	~~19.26~~			~~19.26~~	Q, Doping
2	Jillian Camarena-Williams	United States	x	19.11		19.11	Q
3	Nadine Kleinert	Germany	19.00			19.00	Q
4	Michelle Carter	United States	18.61			18.61	Q
5	Irina Tarasova	Russia	18.33	18.49	18.57	18.57	q
6	Yevgeniya Kolodko	Russia	18.28	18.52	18.36	18.52	q
7	Liu Xiangrong	China	18.29	x	18.13	18.29	q
8	Alena Kopets	Belarus	17.80	x	x	17.80	
9	Christina Schwanitz	Germany	17.19	x	17.58	17.58	
10	Misleydis González	Cuba	17.17	17.12	17.32	17.32	
11	Leila Rajabi	Iran	16.98	17.29	17.08	17.29	
12	Paulina Guba	Poland	16.72	16.92	17.15	17.15	
13	Jessica Cérival	France	15.89	16.18	16.47	16.47	
14	Úrsula Ruiz	Spain	x	16.43	15.70	16.43	
15	Halyna Obleshchuk	Ukraine	16.15	16.39	16.13	16.39	
16	Emel Dereli	Turkey	16.02	x	15.99	16.02	
	Radoslava Mavrodieva	Bulgaria	x	x	x	NM	

=== Final ===
8 athletes from 6 countries participated. The final started at 18:11 and ended at 19:00.

Rank	Athlete	Nationality	#1	#2	#3	#4	#5	#6	Result	Notes
1st place, gold medalist(s)	Valerie Adams	New Zealand	x	20.48	x	20.41	20.29	20.54	20.54	AR
DQ	Nadzeya Astapchuk	Belarus	~~20.20~~	x	~~20.12~~	x	~~20.42~~	x	~~20.42~~	Doping
2nd place, silver medalist(s)	Michelle Carter	United States	18.88	19.36	19.58	19.30	18.66	x	19.58	SB
3rd place, bronze medalist(s)	Jillian Camarena-Williams	United States	18.70	19.44	x	19.32	x	19.24	19.44	
4	Nadine Kleinert	Germany	19.11	19.29	19.27	x	x	18.91	19.29	
5	Liu Xiangrong	China	17.89	x	18.04	x	x	18.63	18.63	SB
6	Yevgeniya Kolodko	Russia	17.61	17.41	17.88	18.09	18.17	18.57	18.57	
7	Irina Tarasova	Russia	18.10	18.19	18.28	18.26	18.54	x	18.54	
