= 2016 IAAF World Indoor Championships – Women's shot put =

Women's shot put at the 2016 IAAF World Indoor Championships
- Venue: Oregon Convention Center
- Dates: March 19
- Competitors: 11 from 9 nations
- Winning distance: 20.21

Medalists
gold medal	Michelle Carter	United States
silver medal	Anita Márton	Hungary
bronze medal	Valerie Adams	New Zealand

The women's shot put at the 2016 IAAF World Indoor Championships took place on March 19, 2016.

That Valerie Adams took the lead in the first round was not a surprise. Over the previous decade, the only woman to defeat Adams in a major international competition, turned out to be a serial drug cheat. What might have been foretelling was that the lead was not already insurmountable. In the second round, Michelle Carter took the lead, which she solidified in the third round, even though Adams hit her best throw of the competition in that round. Adams may not be back to 100% after the multiple surgeries which caused her absence in Beijing, her best more than a meter short of where she would normally be throwing. But Carter was challenged, when Anita Márton threw her National Record 19.33 on her final attempt. That lasted only long enough for Carter to make her final attempt, 20.21 m (66 ft 3 1/2 in) was almost a 3-foot improvement for the winner.

== Results ==
The final was started at 17.45.

Rank	Athlete	Nationality	#1	#2	#3	#4	#5	#6	Result	Notes
1st place, gold medalist(s)	Michelle Carter	United States	x	18.90	19.31	19.28	x	20.21	20.21	WL
2nd place, silver medalist(s)	Anita Márton	Hungary	17.99	18.38	19.01	18.71	19.08	19.33	19.33	NR
3rd place, bronze medalist(s)	Valerie Adams	New Zealand	18.49	18.30	19.25	x	19.02	18.31	19.25	
4	Cleopatra Borel	Trinidad and Tobago	17.41	17.73	17.59	17.31	18.38	17.50	18.38	SB
5	Jillian Camarena-Williams	United States	18.17	x	x	17.57	17.52		18.17	
6	Radoslava Mavrodieva	Bulgaria	17.01	18.00	x	x	17.91		18.00	SB
7	Lena Urbaniak	Germany	x	17.19	17.55	x	17.91		17.91	
8	Gao Yang	China	17.26	17.27	17.65	17.67	17.02		17.67	
9	Aliona Dubitskaya	Belarus	17.45	x	x				17.45	
10	Bian Ka	China	16.86	17.13	17.34				17.34	
11	Chiara Rosa	Italy	17.10	x	16.89				17.10	
