= Wataru Yazawa =

Japanese hurdler (born 1991)

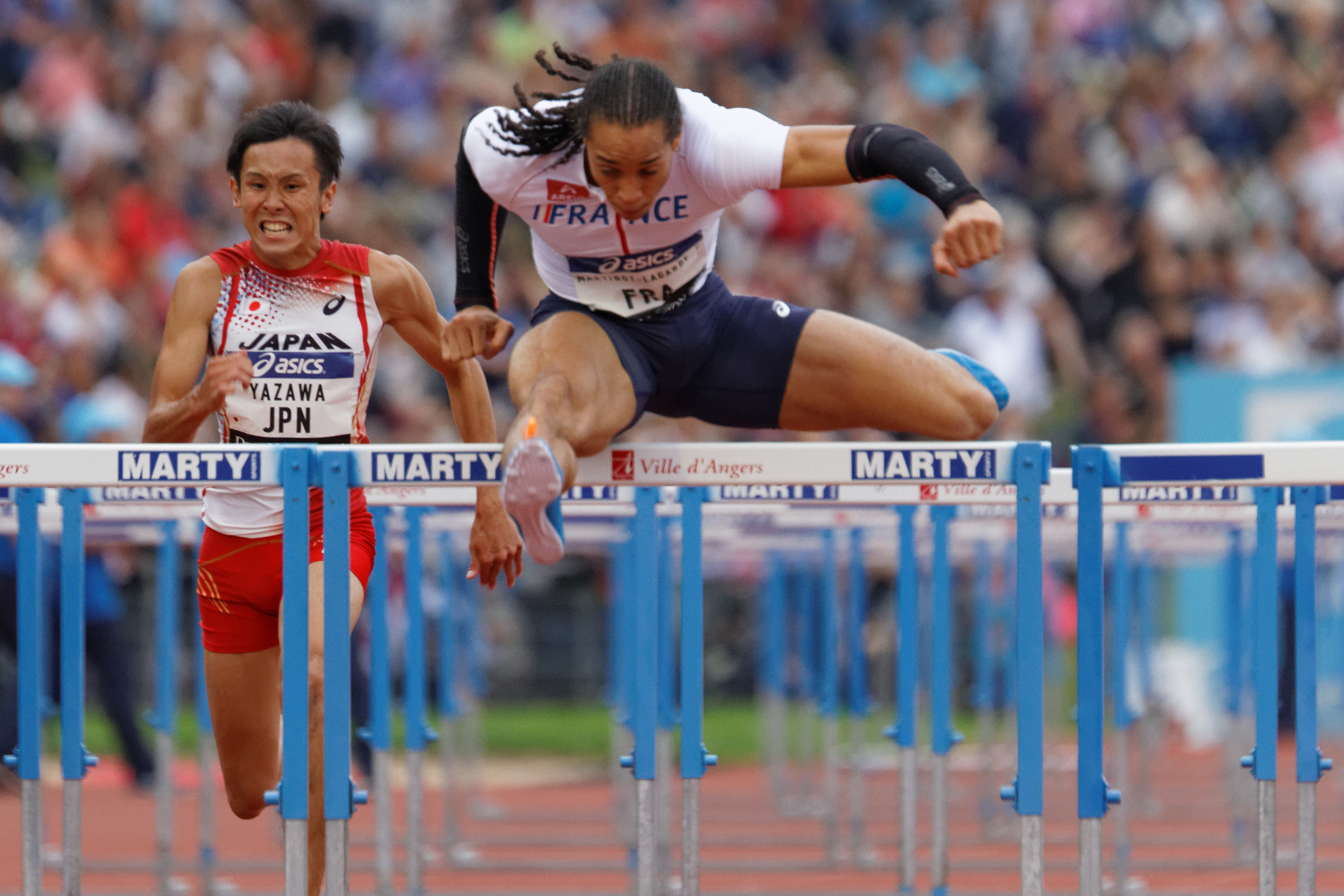
- Yazawa at the 2014 DécaNation (left)

Personal information
- Nationality: Japan
- Born: 2 July 1991 (age 35) Yokohama, Kanagawa Prefecture, Japan
- Height: 1.78 m (5 ft 10 in)
- Weight: 62 kg (137 lb)

Sport
- Sport: Track and field
- Event: 110 metres hurdles
- University team: Hosei University
- Club: Descente Track Club

Achievements and titles
- Personal best(s): 60 m hurdles: 7.86 (Osaka 2015); 110 m hurdles: 13.47 (Tottori 2016)
Medal record
Men's athletics
Representing Japan
Asian Championships
Bronze medal – third place	2013 Pune	110 m hurdles

Wataru Yazawa (矢澤 航, Yazawa Wataru; born 2 July 1991 in Yokohama) is a Japanese track and field athlete who specialises in the 110 metres hurdles. He won the Bronze medal at the Asian Championships in Pune at the 110 m hurdles. His personal best is 13.47 seconds, set in Tottori on 5 June 2016.

== Personal bests ==
Event	Time	Wind	Venue	Date	Notes
60 m hurdles (Indoor)	7.86 s		Osaka, Japan	7 February 2015	
110 m hurdles	13.47 s	+1.4 m/s	Tottori, Japan	5 June 2016	Japan's 5th-fastest time

== Records ==
- 110 m hurdles (91.4 cm)
  - Current Japan's junior high school record holder - 13.84 s (+0.6 m/s) (Marugame, 21 August 2006)
- 110 m hurdles (99.1 cm)
  - Former Japan's youth best holder - 13.67 s (-1.0 m/s) (Bydgoszcz, 12 July 2008)

== Competition record ==
Year	Competition	Venue	Position	Event	Notes
Representing Japan
2008	World Junior Championships	Bydgoszcz, Poland	8th (sf)	110 m hurdles (99.1 cm)	13.67 (wind: -1.0 m/s) NYB
2010	World Junior Championships	Moncton, Canada	7th	110 m hurdles (99.1 cm)	13.88 (wind: -2.4 m/s)
2011	Asian Championships	Kobe, Japan	9th (h)	110 m hurdles	14.21 (wind: -2.1 m/s)
2011	Universiade	Shenzhen, China	13th (sf)	110 m hurdles	13.97 (wind: +0.2 m/s)
2013	Asian Championships	Pune, India	3rd	110 m hurdles	13.88 (wind: +0.1 m/s)
2013	East Asian Games	Tianjin, China	4th	110 m hurdles	13.73 (wind: -0.2 m/s)
2014	DécaNation	Paris, France	3rd	110 m hurdles	13.74 (wind: -0.1 m/s)
2016	Olympics	Rio de Janeiro, Brazil	32nd (h)	110 m hurdles	13.88 (wind: -0.1 m/s)
2016	DécaNation	Marseille, France	2nd	110 m hurdles	13.74 (wind: -0.1 m/s)
2017	Asian Championships	Bhubaneswar, India	8th	110 m hurdles	14.07 (wind: -0.6 m/s)

=== National Championship ===
Year	Competition	Venue	Position	Event	Notes
2010	Japan Championships	Yokohama, Kanagawa	– (h)	4 × 100 m relay	DQ (relay leg: 4th)
2011	Japan Championships	Kumagaya, Saitama	1st	110 m hurdles	13.86 (wind: -0.1 m/s)
2011	Japan Championships	Yokohama, Kanagawa	2nd	4 × 100 m relay	39.89 (relay leg: 1st)
2012	Japan Championships	Osaka, Osaka	– (f)	110 m hurdles	DQ
2013	Japan Championships	Chōfu, Tokyo	1st	110 m hurdles	13.59 (wind: +1.3 m/s) PB
2014	Japan Championships	Fukushima, Fukushima	2nd	110 m hurdles	13.59 (wind: +0.4 m/s) =PB
2015	Japan Championships	Niigata, Niigata	9th (h)	110 m hurdles	14.02 (wind: +0.4 m/s)
2016	Japan Championships	Nagoya, Aichi	1st	110 m hurdles	13.48 (wind: +2.4 m/s)
2017	Japan Championships	Osaka, Osaka	2nd	110 m hurdles	13.61 (wind: -0.2 m/s)
