= 2004 World Junior Championships in Athletics – Women's shot put =

The women's shot put event at the 2004 World Junior Championships in Athletics was held in Grosseto, Italy, at Stadio Olimpico Carlo Zecchini on 16 and 17 July.

== Medalists ==
Gold	Michelle Carter; United States
Silver	Anna Avdeyeva; Russia
Bronze	Christina Schwanitz; Germany

== Results ==
=== Final ===
17 July

Rank	Name	Nationality	Attempts						Result	Notes
Rank	Name	Nationality	1	2	3	4	5	6	Result	Notes
1st place, gold medalist(s)	Michelle Carter	United States	16.78	15.83	16.24	x	16.44	17.55	17.55	
2nd place, silver medalist(s)	Anna Avdeyeva	Russia	15.19	16.45	15.85	x	16.08	17.13	17.13	
3rd place, bronze medalist(s)	Christina Schwanitz	Germany	15.26	15.33	15.48	x	16.41	16.52	16.52	
4	Sivan Jean	Israel	15.52	15.55	14.45	x	14.30	16.36	16.36	
5	Irina Tarasova	Russia	15.66	16.16	16.16	15.91	15.48	15.39	16.16	
6	Radoslava Mavrodieva	Bulgaria	15.65	x	15.44	x	15.57	15.79	15.79	
7	Hrisí Moisídou	Greece	15.30	15.45	15.33	x	15.49	x	15.49	
8	Denise Kemkers	Netherlands	x	x	15.46	15.13	14.77	15.06	15.46	
9	Marli Knoetze	South Africa	13.89	15.28	15.01				15.28	
10	Annie Alexander	Trinidad and Tobago	14.36	15.15	15.21				15.21	
11	Amarya Albury	Bahamas	x	14.72	15.18				15.18	
12	Magdalena Sobieszek	Poland	15.15	15.12	x				15.15	

=== Qualifications ===
16 July

==== Group A ====
Rank	Name	Nationality	Attempts			Result	Notes
Rank	Name	Nationality	1	2	3	Result	Notes
1	Anna Avdeyeva	Russia	14.29	15.63	16.65	16.65	Q
2	Radoslava Mavrodieva	Bulgaria	x	15.61	15.03	15.61	q
3	Sivan Jean	Israel	14.63	15.52	14.81	15.52	q
4	Marli Knoetze	South Africa	15.35	14.86	14.18	15.35	q
5	Denise Kemkers	Netherlands	14.96	15.29	14.78	15.29	q
6	Amarya Albury	Bahamas	15.20	14.18	14.47	15.20	q
7	Heike Koderisch	Germany	15.10	14.60	15.04	15.10	
8	Isabelle Yacoubou	Benin	14.78	14.89	14.77	14.89	
9	Leydi Arboleda	Colombia	14.48	x	14.53	14.53	
10	Michaela Wallerstedt	United States	14.20	13.88	13.66	14.20	
11	Vasilina Kozyarskaya	Uzbekistan	14.05	13.54	x	14.05	
12	Izabela Koralewska	Poland	x	x	14.05	14.05	

==== Group B ====
Rank	Name	Nationality	Attempts			Result	Notes
Rank	Name	Nationality	1	2	3	Result	Notes
1	Christina Schwanitz	Germany	16.44	-	-	16.44	Q
2	Magdalena Sobieszek	Poland	15.89	-	-	15.89	Q
3	Irina Tarasova	Russia	15.62	15.81	-	15.81	Q
4	Hrisí Moisídou	Greece	15.42	14.64	15.74	15.74	Q
5	Michelle Carter	United States	15.61	x	15.46	15.61	q
6	Annie Alexander	Trinidad and Tobago	14.21	15.34	15.06	15.34	q
7	Simoné du Toit	South Africa	14.27	14.63	15.16	15.16	
8	Tatsiana Mialeshka	Belarus	14.17	14.70	15.03	15.03	
9	Mariam Kevkhishvili	Georgia	14.87	14.77	14.96	14.96	
10	Beverley Ladrezeau	France	13.49	14.89	13.67	14.89	
11	Ahymará Espinoza	Venezuela	13.42	14.24	x	14.24	
12	Tressa-Ann Charles	Saint Lucia	14.09	13.33	x	14.09	

== Participation ==
According to an unofficial count, 24 athletes from 19 countries participated in the event.

- Bahamas (1)
- Belarus (1)
- Benin (1)
- Bulgaria (1)
- Colombia (1)
- France (1)
- Georgia (1)
- Germany (2)
- Greece (1)
- Israel (1)
- Netherlands (1)
- Poland (2)
- Russia (2)
- Saint Lucia (1)
- South Africa (2)
- Trinidad and Tobago (1)
- United States (2)
- Uzbekistan (1)
- Venezuela (1)
