= Michael Cochrane (hurdler) =

New Zealand athlete

Personal information
- Born: 13 August 1991 (age 34)

Sport
- Country: New Zealand
- Sport: Track and field
- Event: 400 metres hurdles

Michael Cochrane (born 13 August 1991) is a New Zealand hurdler. He competed in the 400 metres hurdles event at the 2015 World Championships in Beijing without qualifying for the final. His personal best in the 400 metres hurdles is 49.58 seconds set in Beijing in 2015. This is the former national record.

== Competition record ==
Year	Competition	Venue	Position	Event	Notes
Representing New Zealand
2008	Oceania Youth Championships	Saipan, Northern Mariana Islands	3rd	110 m hurdles (91.4 cm)	14.97
2008	Oceania Youth Championships	Saipan, Northern Mariana Islands	1st	400 m hurdles	54.69
2008	Oceania Youth Championships	Saipan, Northern Mariana Islands	1st	4 × 100 m relay	43.60
2008	Oceania Youth Championships	Saipan, Northern Mariana Islands	2nd	High jump	1.70 m
2009	Polynesian Championships	Gold Coast, Australia	3rd	110 m hurdles	15.47
2009	Polynesian Championships	Gold Coast, Australia	1st	400 m hurdles	56.16
2009	Polynesian Championships	Gold Coast, Australia	3rd	Long jump	5.91 m
2010	World Junior Championships	Moncton, Canada	32nd (h)	110 m hurdles (99 cm)	14.28
2010	World Junior Championships	Moncton, Canada	18th (sf)	400 m hurdles	52.71
2011	Universiade	Shenzhen, China	31st (h)	400 m hurdles	55.98
2014	Continental Cup	Marrakesh, Morocco	8th	400 m hurdles	52.93
2015	Oceania Championships	Cairns, Australia	1st	400 m hurdles	50.69
2015	World Championships	Beijing, China	28th (h)	400 m hurdles	49.58
