= Viktoryia Kolb =

Belarusian shot putter (born 1993)

Personal information
- Full name: Viktoryia Alehauna Kolb
- Born: 26 October 1993 (age 32) Baranavichy, Belarus

Sport
- Sport: Athletics
- Event: Shot put

Viktoryia Alehauna Kolb (Belarusian: Вікторыя Алегаўна Колб; born 26 October 1993) is a Belarusian athlete specialising in the shot put. She won the gold medal at the 2015 European U23 Championships.

Her personal bests in the event are 18.16 metres outdoors (Brest 2018) and 17.50 metres indoors (Mogilyov 2017).

== International competitions ==
Year	Competition	Venue	Position	Event	Notes
Representing Belarus
2010	Youth Olympic Games	Singapore	6th	Shot put	14.61 m
2011	European Junior Championships	Tallinn, Estonia	14th (q)	Shot put	13.95 m
2012	World Junior Championships	Barcelona, Spain	15th (q)	Shot put	14.25 m
2014	European Cup Winter Throwing (U23)	Leiria, Portugal	3rd	Shot put	16.81 m
2015	European Cup Winter Throwing (U23)	Leiria, Portugal	3rd	Shot put	16.46 m
2015	European U23 Championships	Tallinn, Estonia	1st	Shot put	17.47 m
2016	European Championships	Amsterdam, Netherlands	17th (q)	Shot put	16.27 m
2017	European IndoorChampionships	Belgrade, Serbia	11th (q)	Shot put	17.22 m
2018	European Championships	Berlin, Germany	8th	Shot put	17.50 m
2019	European Indoor Championships	Glasgow, United Kingdom	11th (q)	Shot put	17.11 m
