= Yuliya Leantsiuk =

Belarusian shot putter

Medal record

Women's athletics

Representing Belarus

European Championships
Bronze medal – third place	2014 Zürich	Shot put

European Indoor Championships
Silver medal – second place	2015 Prague	Shot put
Bronze medal – third place	2017 Belgrade	Shot put

Universiade
Silver medal – second place	2007 Bangkok	Shot put

Military World Games
Silver medal – second place	2007 Hyderabad	Shot put

Yuliya Siarheyevna Leantsiuk (Belarusian: Юлія Сяргееўна Леанцюк; born 31 January 1984 in Pinsk) is a Belarusian track and field athlete who competes in the shot put. Her personal best for the event is 19.79 m (64 ft 11 in). She represented her country at the 2013 World Championships in Athletics and the 2014 IAAF World Indoor Championships.

She was a silver medallist at the Summer Universiade and Military World Games in 2007, and a bronze medallist at the 2001 World Youth Championships in Athletics. She was banned for doping in 2008.

== Career ==
=== Early career ===
Leantsiuk made her international debut in 2001 at the age of seventeen. Competing at the 2001 World Youth Championships in Athletics, she was the bronze medallist behind Valerie Adams and Michelle Carter. Shortly afterwards she won a gold medal at the 2001 European Youth Olympic Festival, beating Mama Fatty. The following year she improved her personal best to 16.47 m (54 ft 1/4 in) and came seventh at the 2002 World Junior Championships in Athletics.

Leantsiuk came third at the Belarusian championships in 2003 and won the national junior title with a new best throw of 17.44 m (57 ft 2 1/2 in). She was runner-up to Russian rival Anna Avdeyeva at the 2003 European Athletics Junior Championships. She did not improve in 2004 – her first year of full senior competition – but managed a throw of 17.91 m (58 ft 9 in) at the 2005 European Athletics U23 Championships, taking fourth place. She cleared eighteen metres for the first time in 2006 and ended the year with an improved personal best of 18.86 m (61 ft 10 1/2 in). She was also second in the First League meeting of the 2006 European Cup.

=== Senior medals and doping ban ===
Leantsiuk began her 2007 indoor season with an indoor best of 18.62 m (61 ft 1 in) in Brest. In good form, she won the Belarusian indoor title and represented her country at the 2007 European Athletics Indoor Championships, where she was fourth. A fourth-place finish at the 2007 European Cup Winter Throwing followed later that month. She threw the implement 18.89 m (61 ft 11 1/2 in) in Minsk that June and went on to claim silver medals at both the Summer Universiade and the Military World Games. At the start of 2008 she was fourth at the European Indoor Cup and fifth at the European Winter Throwing Cup. A significant personal best of 19.79 m (64 ft 11 in) came at the end of May but her performance at the 2008 European Cup was erased as she failed a doping test for excess testosterone and was banned from competition until July 2010.

=== Return to shot put ===
She did not return immediately after her ban and finally returned to track and field at the beginning of 2013. She opened with a throw of 18.47 m (60 ft 7 in), but that was her best that year and she threw beyond eighteen metres only a handful of times. She came sixth at the 2013 European Team Championships and had two podium finishes at the Belarusian National Championships: she was runner-up in the shot put but also took third in the discus throw, managing a best of 47.07 m (154 ft 5 in) for the new event. She represented Belarus in the shot put at the 2013 World Championships in Athletics, but did not progress beyond the qualifying round. Leantsiuk began 2014 in personal best form, throwing 18.70 m (61 ft 4 in) for second at the national indoor championships, then an indoor best of 18.85 m (61 ft 10 in) at the 2014 IAAF World Indoor Championships was enough to reach the World Indoor final. She did not throw as far in the final, however, and finished seventh.
