= Hamid Manssour =

Syrian discus thrower

Personal information
- Born: 29 April 1992 (age 33)

Sport
- Country: Syria
- Sport: Athletics
- Event: Discus throw

Hamid Manssour (born 29 April 1992) is a Syrian male discus thrower, who won an individual gold medal at the Youth World Championships.
