= Jack Meredith (athlete) =

British hurdler (born 1992)

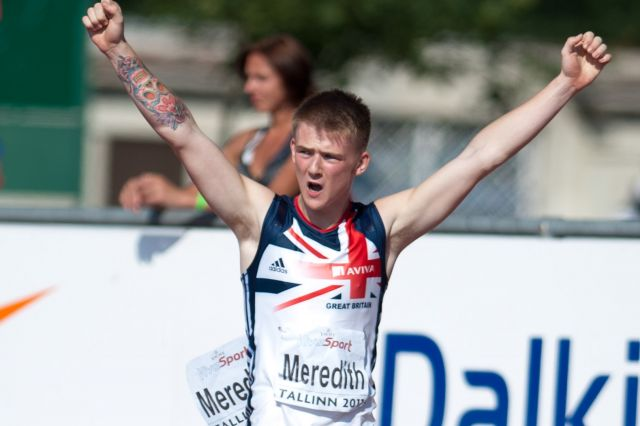
- Meredith at the 2011 European Athletics Junior Championships in Tallinn

Personal information
- Nationality: Great Britain
- Born: 14 August 1992 (age 33)

Sport
- Sport: Running
- Event: Hurdling
- Club: Liverpool Harriers

Achievements and titles
- Personal best: 110 m H: 13.32 (Oslo 2010)
Medal record
Men's athletics
Representing Great Britain
World Junior Championships
Bronze medal – third place	2010 Moncton	110 m hurdles
European Junior Championships
Gold medal – first place	2011 Tallinn	110 m hurdles
World Youth Championships
Silver medal – second place	2009 Brixen	110 m hurdles

Jack Meredith (born 14 August 1992) is a British hurdler. He won gold at the 2011 European Athletics Junior Championships in Tallinn, Estonia.
