= Chen Hongqiu =

Chinese athlete

Personal information
- Born: 11 August 1992 (age 33)

Sport
- Country: China
- Sport: Athletics
- Event: Hammer throw

Chen Hongqiu (Chinese: 陈洪秋, born 11 August 1992) is a Chinese male hammer thrower, who won an individual gold medal at the Youth World Championships.
