= Sam Baines =

Australian hurdler

Sam Baines (born 8 February 1991 in Melbourne) is an Australian track and field athlete, specialising in the 110 m Hurdles.

== Biography ==
Baines was born in Melbourne. He holds the Australian U/18 Record for the 110m Hurdles and also holds the Commonwealth Youth Record. He is coached by James Karageorgiou and competes for the Old Melburnians Athletics Club.

=== 2008 ===
At the III Commonwealth Youth Games in Pune, India he placed 1st in a Commonwealth Youth record time of 13.77s.

He was ranked number 1 in the world for U/18 110m Hurdles.

=== 2010 ===
He competed at the 13th IAAF World Junior Championships in Athletics and placed 4th in the Final.

Personal bests
Event	Venue	Time
100m	Melbourne	10.75
110mH(91 cm)	Canberra	13.28
110mH(99 cm)	Brisbane	13.53
110mH(106 cm)	Brisbane	13.54
400m	Canberra	48.87
