= Li Shanshan (discus thrower) =

Chinese discus thrower (born 1992)

Personal information
- Born: 6 January 1992 (age 34)

Sport
- Country: China
- Sport: Athletics
- Event: Discus throw

Achievements and titles
- Personal best: Discus throw: 56.26 m (2012)

Li Shanshan (born 6 January 1992) is a Chinese female discus thrower, who won an individual gold medal at the Youth World Championships.
