= Brittany Crew =

Canadian shot putter (b. 1994)

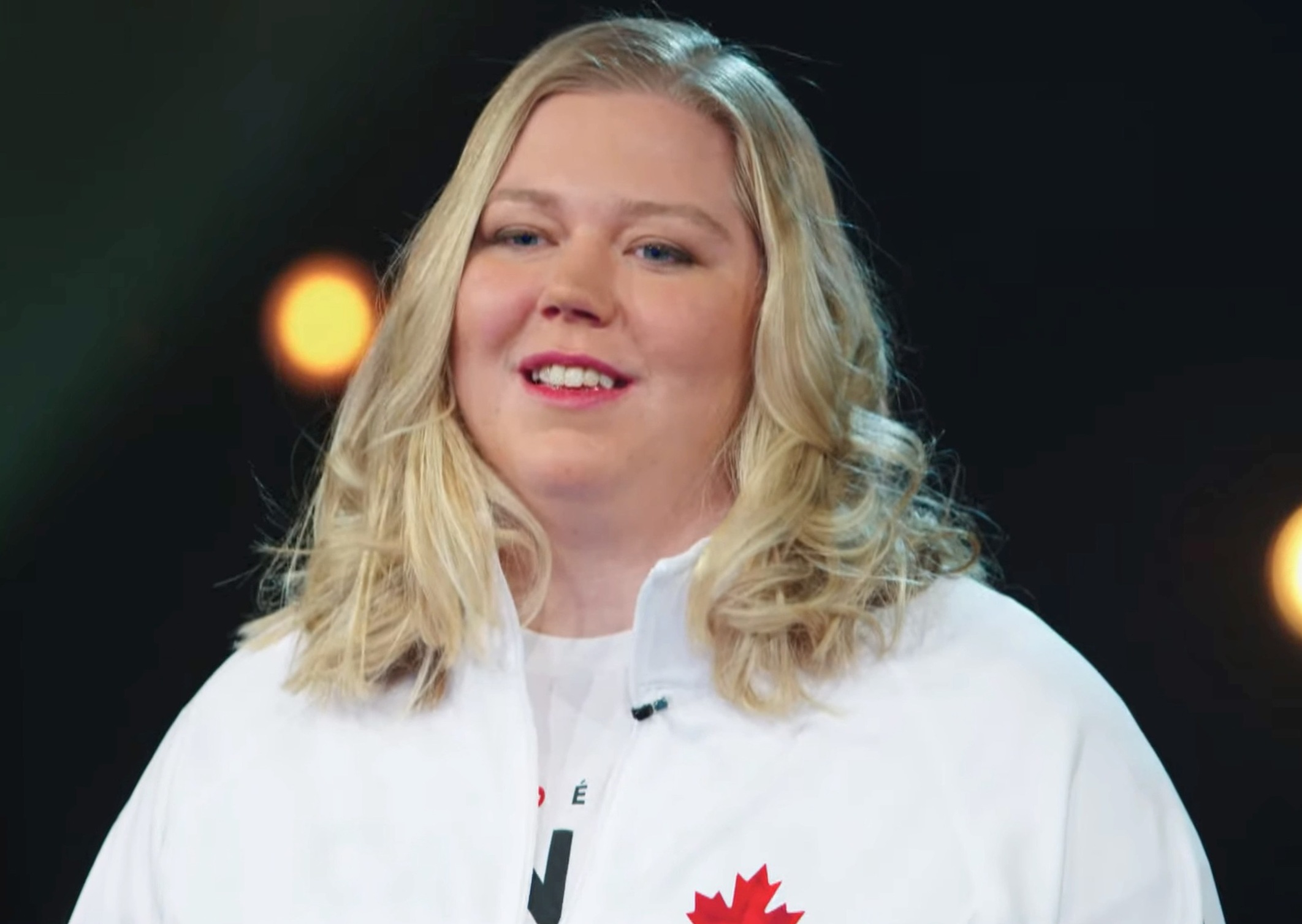
- Crew in 2021

Personal information
- Full name: Brittany Ann Nicole Crew
- Born: March 6, 1994 (age 32) Mississauga, Ontario, Canada
- Height: 178 cm (5 ft 10 in)
- Weight: 112 kg (247 lb)

Sport
- Country: Canada
- Sport: Athletics
- Event: Shot put

Achievements and titles
- Personal best(s): 19.28 m (63 ft 3 in), 2019
Medal record
Women's athletics
Representing Canada
Commonwealth Games
Bronze medal – third place	2018 Gold Coast	Shot put
Pan American Games
Silver medal – second place	2019 Lima	Shot put
Universiade
Gold medal – first place	2017 Taipei	Shot put
Bronze medal – third place	2015 Gwangju	Shot put

Brittany Ann Nicole Crew (born March 6, 1994, in Mississauga, Ontario) is a Canadian track and field athlete competing in the shot put.

Crew is an alumna of York University in Toronto.

== Career ==
In July 2016 she was named to Canada's Olympic team.

At the 2017 Summer Universiade in Taipei, Crew won gold with a best throw of 18.34 meters. At the 2018 Commonwealth Games in Gold Coast, Australia, Crew won bronze with a best throw of 18.32 metres.

In 2019, Crew threw 19.28 to break her own Canadian record.

Crew competed at the 2020 Summer Olympics.

== Awards and honors ==
- 2019 York University Female Athlete of the Year
