= 2010 IAAF World Indoor Championships – Women's shot put =

The women's shot put at the 2010 IAAF World Indoor Championships was held at the ASPIRE Dome on 13 and 14 March.

== Medalists ==
Gold	Silver	Bronze
Valerie Vili; New Zealand	Anna Avdeyeva; Russia	Nadine Kleinert; Germany

== Records ==
Standing records prior to the 2010 IAAF World Indoor Championships
World record	Helena Fibingerová (TCH)	22.50	Jablonec, Czechoslovakia	19 February 1977
Championship record	Irina Korzhanenko (RUS)	20.55	Birmingham, Great Britain	15 March 2003
World Leading	Nadzeya Ostapchuk (BLR)	21.70	Mogilev, Belarus	12 February 2010
African record	Vivian Chukwuemeka (NGR)	18.13	Flagstaff, United States	4 February 2006
Asian record	Sui Xinmei (CHN)	21.10	Beijing, China	3 March 1990
European record	Helena Fibingerová (TCH)	22.50	Jablonec, Czechoslovakia	19 February 1977
North and Central American and Caribbean record	Ramona Pagel (USA)	19.83	Inglewood, United States	20 February 1987
Oceanian Record	Valerie Vili (NZL)	20.19	Valencia, Spain	9 March 2008
South American record	Elisângela Adriano (BRA)	18.33	Piraeus, Greece	24 February 1999

== Qualification standards ==
Indoor
17.50 m

== Schedule ==
Date	Time	Round
March 13, 2010	9:20	Qualification
March 14, 2010	16:35	Final

== Results ==
=== Qualification ===
Qualification: Qualifying Performance 18.50 (Q) or at least 8 best performers (q) advance to the final.

Rank	Athlete	Nationality	#1	#2	#3	Result	Notes
DQ	Nadzeya Ostapchuk	Belarus	~~20.09~~			~~20.09~~	Q
1	Valerie Vili	New Zealand	19.81			19.81	Q
DQ	Anca Heltne	Romania	~~19.10~~			~~19.10~~	Q
2	Gong Lijiao	China	18.87			18.87	Q, SB
3	Jillian Camarena-Williams	United States	18.85			18.85	Q, SB
4	Nadine Kleinert	Germany	x	18.77		18.77	Q
DQ	Natallia Mikhnevich	Belarus	~~18.67~~			~~18.67~~	Q
5	Anna Avdeyeva	Russia	18.53			18.53	Q
6	Misleydis González	Cuba	17.69	18.51		18.51	Q
7	Olga Ivanova	Russia	18.42	x	x	18.42	
8	Liu Xiangrong	China	18.34	18.15	x	18.34	SB
9	Cleopatra Borel-Brown	Trinidad and Tobago	17.98	18.31	18.09	18.31	
10	Michelle Carter	United States	18.16	x	18.20	18.20	SB
11	Melissa Boekelman	Netherlands	x	16.91	17.57	17.57	
12	Austra Skujytė	Lithuania	17.07	17.28	17.55	17.55	
13	Mailín Vargas	Cuba	17.37	17.52	x	17.52	
14	Anita Márton	Hungary	17.34	17.08	16.98	17.34	

=== Final ===
Rank	Athlete	Nationality	#1	#2	#3	#4	#5	#6	Result	Notes
DQ	Nadzeya Ostapchuk	Belarus	20.24	x	x	x	20.68	20.85	20.85	~~CR~~
1st place, gold medalist(s)	Valerie Vili	New Zealand	x	20.45	20.41	20.10	20.49	20.27	20.49	AR
DQ	Natallia Mikhnevich	Belarus	20.42	x	19.53	19.64	x	x	20.42	~~SB~~
2nd place, silver medalist(s)	Anna Avdeyeva	Russia	18.64	19.41	19.47	19.42	19.26	x	19.47	SB
3rd place, bronze medalist(s)	Nadine Kleinert	Germany	18.91	18.62	19.16	18.42	x	19.34	19.34	SB
4	Jillian Camarena-Williams	United States	x	17.88	18.41	19.08	19.34	18.98	19.34	PB
DQ	Anca Heltne	Romania	~~18.86~~	~~18.58~~	x	x	x	x	~~18.86~~	
5	Misleydis González	Cuba	18.56	x	18.77	18.57	18.74	18.37	18.77	
6	Gong Lijiao	China	x	18.50	18.34	18.58	18.64	18.54	18.64	
