= Anna Avdeyeva =

Russian shot putter (born 1985)

Personal information
- Born: April 6, 1985 (age 40) Orenburg, Soviet Union
- Height: 1.75 m (5 ft 9 in)
- Weight: 100 kg (220 lb)

Sport
- Country: Russia
- Sport: Athletics
- Event: Shot Put
- Updated on 6 August 2012

Anna Mikhailovna Avdeyeva (Russian: Анна Михайловна Авде́ева; also known as Anna Avdeeva, born 6 April 1985 in Orenburg) is a Russian shot putter. She was fifth at the 2009 World Championships in Athletics and improved to fourth at the 2010 IAAF World Indoor Championships. Her personal best throw is 20.07 metres, achieved in July 2009 in Cheboksary.

She finished eighth at the 2002 World Junior Championships, won the silver medal at the 2004 World Junior Championships and finished eighth at the 2005 Summer Universiade. She also competed at the 2007 World Championships without reaching the finals.

Avdeyeva failed an out-of-competition doping test in July 2013 and was given a two-year ban from competitive athletics.

== International competitions ==
Representing Russia
Year	Competition	Venue	Position	Event	Result	Notes
2002	World Junior Championships	Kingston, Jamaica	8th	Shot put	15.83 m	
2003	European Junior Championships	Tampere, Finland	1st	Shot put	16.71 m	
2004	World Junior Championships	Grosseto, Italy	2nd	Shot put	17.13 m	
2005	European U23 Championships	Erfurt, Germany	6th	Shot put	16.52 m	
2005	Universiade	İzmir, Turkey	8th	Shot put	16.18 m	
2007	European U23 Championships	Debrecen, Hungary	3rd	Shot put	17.47 m	
2007	World Championships	Osaka, Japan	14th (q)	Shot put	18.19 m	
2008	World Indoor Championships	Valencia, Spain	12th (q)	Shot put	17.79 m	
2009	European Indoor Championships	Turin, Italy	6th	Shot put	17.96 m	
2009	World Championships	Berlin, Germany	5th	Shot put	19.66 m	
2010	World Indoor Championships	Doha, Qatar	2nd	Shot put	19.47 m	Originally 4th before Nadzeya Astapchuk and Natallia Mikhnevich's disqualifications
2010	European Championships	Barcelona, Spain	1st	Shot put	19.39 m	Originally 3rd before Nadzeya Astapchuk and Natallia Mikhnevich's disqualifications
2011	European Indoor Championships	Paris, France	1st	Shot put	18.70 m	
2011	World Championships	Daegu, South Korea	6th	Shot put	19.54 m	Originally 7th before Nadzeya Astapchuk's disqualification
2012	Olympic Games	London, United Kingdom	24th (q)	Shot put	17.47 m	

== National titles ==
- Russian Athletics Championships
  - Shot put: 2009, 2010, 2017

== See also ==
- List of doping cases in athletics
- List of IAAF World Indoor Championships medalists (women)
- List of European Athletics Championships medalists (women)
- List of stripped European Athletics Championships medals
- List of European Athletics Indoor Championships medalists
