= 2011 World Championships in Athletics – Women's shot put =

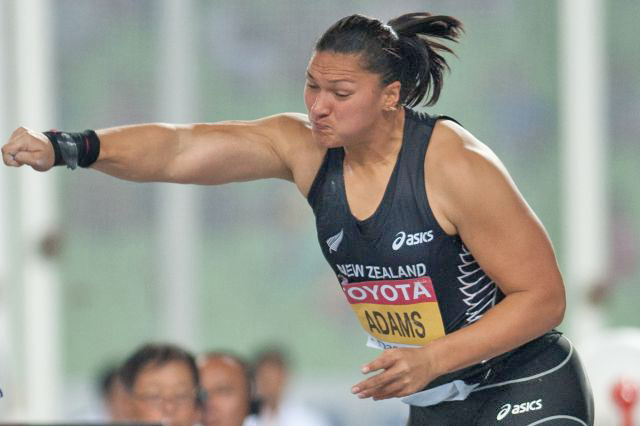
Valerie Adams putting at Daegu

Official Video

The Women's shot put event at the 2011 World Championships in Athletics was held at the Daegu Stadium on August 28 and 29. The winning margin was 1.22 metres which as of 2024 remains the only time the women's shot put has been won by more than 1.2 metres at these championships.

There were two main contenders for the gold medal: New Zealander Valerie Vili (who returned to using her maiden name of Adams following her 2010 divorce) and Nadzeya Astapchuk of Belarus. Adams, with four straight wins on the Diamond League circuit, entered the competition as the defending champion and reigning Olympic champion. Astapchuk was the only other woman to have thrown over 20.50 m that season and held the world leading mark of 20.94 m. Other in-form throwers included Americans Jillian Camarena-Williams and Michelle Carter, and Chinese athletes Gong Lijiao and Li Ling. The 2009 silver medallist Nadine Kleinert and 2008 Olympic runner-up Natallia Mikhnevich were present, but neither had performed to a high standard that year.

Having already clearly won the final, Adams relaxed and let loose a put of 21.24 on her final throw. While it only elevated her to 22nd on the all-time list, it was the best throw since Larisa Peleshenko in 2000. It was obviously her personal best and annual world leader, it was also the New Zealand national record and Oceana area record. It also equalled the championship record from 1987. Previous world leader Nadzeya Astapchuk came through in the fifth round with a 20.05 put, to edge past Jillian Camarena-Williams.

== Medalists ==
Gold	Silver	Bronze
Valerie Adams; New Zealand	Jillian Camarena-Williams; United States	Gong Lijiao; China

== Records ==
Prior to the competition, the established records were as follows.

World record	Natalya Lisovskaya (URS)	22.63	Moscow, Soviet Union	7 June 1987
Championship record	Natalya Lisovskaya (URS)	21.24	Rome, Italy	5 September 1987
World leading	Nadzeya Astapchuk (BLR)	20.94	Zhukovsky, Russia	3 July 2011
African record	Vivian Chukwuemeka (NGR)	18.35	Ijebu Ode, Nigeria	17 April 2006
Asian record	Meisu Li (CHN)	21.76	Shijiazhuang, China	23 April 1988
North, Central American and Caribbean record	Belsy Laza (CUB)	20.96	Mexico City, Mexico	2 May 1992
South American record	Elisângela Adriano (BRA)	19.30	Tunja, Colombia	14 July 2001
European record	Natalya Lisovskaya (URS)	22.63	Moscow, Soviet Union	7 June 1987
Oceanian record	Valerie Adams (NZL)	21.07	Thessaloniki, Greece	13 September 2009

== Qualification standards ==
A standard	B standard
18.30	17.30

== Schedule ==
Date	Time	Round
August 28, 2011	10:20	Qualification
August 29, 2011	20:40	Final

== Results ==
=== Qualification ===
Qualification: Qualifying Performance 18.65 (Q) or at least 12 best performers (q) advance to the final.

Rank	Group	Athlete	Nationality	#1	#2	#3	Result	Notes
1	A	Valerie Adams	New Zealand	19.79			19.79	Q
2	B	Gong Lijiao	China	19.21			19.21	Q
3	B	Christina Schwanitz	Germany	19.20			19.20	Q, SB
4	B	Nadzeya Astapchuk	Belarus	19.11			19.11	Q
5	A	Jillian Camarena-Williams	United States	19.09			19.09	Q
6	B	Anna Omarova	Russia	17.86	18.01	19.03	19.03	Q
7	A	Cleopatra Borel-Brown	Trinidad and Tobago	18.20	18.41	18.95	18.95	Q
8	A	Anna Avdeyeva	Russia	18.32	18.33	18.92	18.92	Q
9	B	Yevgeniya Kolodko	Russia	18.58	18.90		18.90	Q
10	A	Natallia Mikhnevich	Belarus	18.88			18.88	Q
11	B	Michelle Carter	United States	18.85			18.85	Q
12	A	Nadine Kleinert	Germany	18.75			18.75	Q
13	A	Li Ling	China	18.67			18.67	Q
14	B	Chiara Rosa	Italy	17.69	18.27	18.28	18.28	
15	B	Mailín Vargas	Cuba	x	18.27	x	18.27	
16	A	Misleydis González	Cuba	18.24	17.96	17.83	18.24	
17	B	Liu Xiangrong	China	17.59	17.96	18.22	18.22	
18	A	Julie Labonté	Canada	17.66	18.04	x	18.04	
19	A	Josephine Terlecki	Germany	17.85	17.72	17.20	17.85	
20	B	Natalia Ducó	Chile	17.42	x	17.42	17.42	
21	A	Sarah Stevens-Walker	United States	16.50	x	17.20	17.20	
22	B	Anita Márton	Hungary	x	16.33	17.04	17.04	
23	B	Lee Mi-Young	South Korea	16.08	16.18	15.96	16.18	
24	B	Simoné du Toit	South Africa	15.83	x	x	15.83	
25	A	Radoslava Mavrodieva	Bulgaria	x	15.76	x	15.76	

=== Final ===
Rank	Athlete	Nationality	#1	#2	#3	#4	#5	#6	Result	Notes
1st place, gold medalist(s)	Valerie Adams	New Zealand	19.37	x	20.04	20.72	x	21.24	21.24	CR, AR, WL
2nd place, silver medalist(s)	Jillian Camarena-Williams	United States	19.63	18.53	19.24	20.02	18.80	19.44	20.02	
3rd place, bronze medalist(s)	Gong Lijiao	China	19.64	x	x	19.82	19.97	x	19.97	
4	Yevgeniya Kolodko	Russia	18.42	18.28	19.78	x	x	19.26	19.78	PB
5	Li Ling	China	19.12	19.71	19.23	19.60	19.50	19.49	19.71	
6	Anna Avdeyeva	Russia	18.80	18.65	19.16	18.96	19.54	18.51	19.54	SB
7	Nadine Kleinert	Germany	19.26	x	18.83	x	x	-	19.26	SB
8	Michelle Carter	United States	18.76	x	18.13				18.76	
9	Anna Omarova	Russia	18.67	x	x				18.67	
10	Natallia Mikhnevich	Belarus	18.44	x	18.47				18.47	
11	Christina Schwanitz	Germany	17.96	x	x				17.96	
12	Cleopatra Borel-Brown	Trinidad and Tobago	x	17.62	17.53				17.62	
	~~Nadezhda Ostapchuk~~	Belarus	~~19.58~~	~~19.34~~	~~19.87~~	~~19.87~~	~~20.05~~	~~19.60~~	~~20.05 m~~	DQ
