= Athletics at the 2005 Summer Universiade – Women's shot put =

The women's shot put event at the 2005 Summer Universiade was held on 16 August in İzmir, Turkey.

== Results ==
Rank	Athlete	Nationality	#1	#2	#3	#4	#5	#6	Result	Notes
1st place, gold medalist(s)	Natallia Mikhnevich	Belarus	18.86	x	x	x	x	18.04	18.86	
2nd place, silver medalist(s)	Li Meiju	China	17.61	17.73	18.26	18.34	x	18.48	18.48	
3rd place, bronze medalist(s)	Misleydis González	Cuba	18.26	18.15	18.01	17.87	x	x	18.26	
4	Assunta Legnante	Italy	16.86	16.96	17.15	17.06	17.31	17.24	17.31	
5	Chiara Rosa	Italy	17.10	x	x	x	16.61	x	17.10	
6	Filiz Kadoğan	Turkey	16.45	16.36	16.14	16.62	x	15.91	16.62	
7	Anca Heltne	Romania	16.23	15.90	x	x	x	15.59	16.23	
8	Anna Avdeyeva	Russia	15.51	x	16.16	16.18	x	x	16.18	
9	Lin Chia-ying	Chinese Taipei	14.57	14.94	14.87				14.94	NR
10	Mariam Kevkhishvili	Georgia	14.22	14.32	14.71				14.71	
11	Mojca Černigoj	Slovenia	14.01	x	14.45				14.45	
12	Yu Sheng-chieh	Chinese Taipei	13.08	13.15	13.41				13.41	
13	Sultana Frizell	Canada	13.30	x	x				13.30	
