= 2009 European Athletics Indoor Championships – Women's shot put =

The Women's shot put event at the 2009 European Athletics Indoor Championships was held on March 6.

== Medalists ==
Gold	Silver	Bronze
Petra Lammert; Germany	Denise Hinrichs; Germany	Anca Heltne; Romania

== Results ==
=== Qualification ===
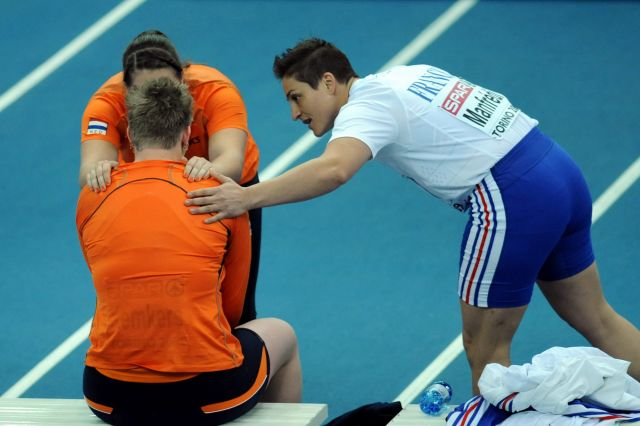
Melissa Boekelman, Denise Kemkers and Laurence Manfrédi (right) during the qualification round.

Qualifying perf. 18.00 (Q) or 8 best performers (q) advanced to the Final.

Rank	Athlete	Nationality	#1	#2	#3	Result	Note
1	Denise Hinrichs	Germany	19.25			19.25	Q
2	Petra Lammert	Germany	18.67			18.67	Q
3	Anca Heltne	Romania	18.44			18.44	Q
4	Anna Omarova	Russia	x	18.37		18.37	Q, SB
5	Assunta Legnante	Italy	17.40	18.09		18.09	Q
6	Anna Avdeyeva	Russia	17.31	18.09		18.09	Q
7	Laurence Manfrédi	France	17.41	x	18.05	18.05	Q
8	Melissa Boekelman	Netherlands	16.54	17.74	17.06	17.74	q, PB
9	Denise Kemkers	Netherlands	17.64	x	17.66	17.66	PB
10	Jessica Cérival	France	16.13	17.07	16.62	17.07	
11	Chiara Rosa	Italy	16.61	16.87	15.46	16.87	
12	Helena Engman	Sweden	16.14	15.83	16.38	16.38	
13	Anita Márton	Hungary	15.69	15.82	x	15.82	

=== Final ===
Rank	Athlete	Nationality	#1	#2	#3	#4	#5	#6	Result	Note
1st place, gold medalist(s)	Petra Lammert	Germany	19.66	x	x	x	x	19.39	19.66	PB
2nd place, silver medalist(s)	Denise Hinrichs	Germany	18.78	19.18	19.43	19.30	19.16	19.63	19.63	PB
3rd place, bronze medalist(s)	Anca Heltne	Romania	18.38	18.70	18.71	18.53	18.64	x	18.71	
4	Anna Omarova	Russia	x	17.90	x	18.37	17.95	x	18.37	
5	Assunta Legnante	Italy	17.59	18.05	x	x	17.95	17.43	18.05	
6	Anna Avdeyeva	Russia	17.35	17.34	17.96	x	x	x	17.96	
7	Laurence Manfrédi	France	17.05	17.25	17.79	17.92	17.69	17.51	17.92	
8	Melissa Boekelman	Netherlands	x	x	x	17.26	17.47	x	17.47	
