= Abigail Ruston =

American shot putter

Abigail Ruston (born April 3, 1983) is an American track and field athlete who specialises in the shot put.

Ruston competed for the Texas State Bobcats track and field team in the NCAA.

She finished twelfth at the 2006 USA Outdoor Track and Field Championships and improved to sixth place the following year with a personal best throw of 17.47 meters. Ruston received NCAA Outdoor All-America honours in 2007.

She finished as the runner-up to Jillian Camarena at the 2008 USA Indoor Track and Field Championships, throwing a personal best of 18.03 m at the competition. As a result, she was selected for the 2008 IAAF World Indoor Championships and finished in eleventh place, outdoing her compatriot Camarena. In the outdoor season that year, she threw a personal best of 18.13 m in May, but only managed eighth at the 2008 United States Olympic Trials with a throw of 17.41 m.

== Personal records ==
Event	Best (m)	Venue	Date
Shot put (outdoor)	18.13	Provo, Utah, United States	May 24, 2008
Shot put (indoor)	18.03	Boston, Massachusetts, United States	February 23, 2008

- All information taken from IAAF profile.

== Competition record ==
Year	Competition	Venue	Position	Notes
2008	World Indoor Championships	Valencia, Spain	11th	17.79 m
