= 2008 IAAF World Indoor Championships – Women's shot put =

At the 2008 IAAF World Indoor Championships, Valerie Vili won the women's shot put event with a mark of 20.19 metres.

== Medalists ==
Gold
Valerie Vili	New Zealand
Silver
Li Meiju	China
Bronze
Misleydis González	Cuba

== Qualification ==
18.45 meters or at least best 8 is required to qualify for the final round.

Pos	Athlete	Country	Mark	Q	Attempts		
Pos	Athlete	Country	Mark	Q	1	2	3
1	Valerie Vili	New Zealand	19.72 AR	Q	19.72		
2	Christina Schwanitz	Germany	18.97	Q	18.97		
3	Anna Omarova	Russia	18.58	Q	X	18.58	
4	Li Meiju	China	18.55 SB	Q	18.55		
DQ	Nadzeya Astapchuk	Belarus	~~18.46~~	Q, doping	~~X~~	~~18.46~~	
5	Chiara Rosa	Italy	18.38	q	18.19	17.86	18.38
6	Cleopatra Borel-Brown	Trinidad and Tobago	18.34 SB	q	18.20	X	18.34
7	Misleydis González	Cuba	18.32 SB	q	18.32	18.15	18.01
8	Denise Hinrichs	Germany	18.25		X	18.14	18.25
9	Assunta Legnante	Italy	18.24		18.24	X	X
10	Abigail Ruston	United States	17.79		17.42	17.79	X
11	Anna Avdeyeva	Russia	17.79		17.19	17.79	X
12	Li Ling	China	17.76		17.35	17.76	17.29
13	Jillian Camarena	United States	17.66		16.41	17.66	17.53
14	Helena Engman	Sweden	16.79		16.79	X	X
15	Lin Chia-Ying	Chinese Taipei	15.77		13.96	X	15.77
	Anca Heltne	Romania	DNS				

== Final ==
Pos	Athlete	Country	Mark	Attempts					
Pos	Athlete	Country	Mark	1	2	3	4	5	6
Gold medal	Valerie Vili	New Zealand	20.19 AR	20.19	X	20.07	19.68	X	19.89
DQ	Nadzeya Astapchuk	Belarus	~~19.74~~	~~19.67~~	~~19.60~~	~~19.74~~	~~X~~	~~X~~	~~X~~
Silver medal	Li Meiju	China	19.09 PB	18.25	18.28	18.62	X	X	19.09
Bronze medal	Misleydis González	Cuba	18.75 PB	18.48	18.43	18.75	X	18.59	18.02
4	Chiara Rosa	Italy	18.68 PB	18.68	18.43	X	18.38	X	X
5	Christina Schwanitz	Germany	18.55	18.54	18.04	18.55	X	17.93	18.21
6	Cleopatra Borel-Brown	Trinidad and Tobago	18.47 SB	18.09	17.56	17.49	18.27	18.47	X
7	Anna Omarova	Russia	17.75	17.07	17.13	17.75	X	X	X
