= Mikhnevich =

Mikhnevich (Belarusian: Міхневіч) is a surname. Notable people with the surname include:

- Natallia Mikhnevich (born 1982), Belarusian shotputter
- Andrei Mikhnevich (born 1976), Belarusian shotputter
