= 2012 European Athletics Championships – Women's shot put =

Women's shot put at the European Athletics Championships

The women's shot put at the 2012 European Athletics Championships was held at the Helsinki Olympic Stadium on 28 and 29 June.

== Medalists ==
Gold	Nadine Kleinert; Germany
Silver	Irina Tarasova; Russia
Bronze	Chiara Rosa; Italy

== Records ==
Standing records prior to the 2012 European Athletics Championships
World record	Natalya Lisovskaya (URS)	22.63	Moscow, Soviet Union	7 June 1987
European record	Natalya Lisovskaya (URS)	22.63	Moscow, Soviet Union	7 June 1987
Championship record	Vita Pavlysh (UKR)	21.69	Budapest, Hungary	20 August 1998
World Leading	Nadzeya Astapchuk (BLR)	21.13	Minsk, Belarus	12 June 2012
European Leading	Nadzeya Astapchuk (BLR)	21.13	Minsk, Belarus	12 June 2012

== Schedule ==
Date	Time	Round
28 June 2012	12:30	Qualification
29 June 2012	18:00	Final

== Results ==
=== Qualification ===
Qualification: Qualification Performance 17.40 (Q) or at least 12 best performers advance to the final

Rank	Group	Athlete	Nationality	#1	#2	#3	Result	Notes
1	B	Nadine Kleinert	Germany	18.65			18.65	Q
2	A	Irina Tarasova	Russia	18.31			18.31	Q
3	B	Josephine Terlecki	Germany	x	18.22		18.22	Q
4	A	Christina Schwanitz	Germany	x	17.92		17.92	Q
5	B	Chiara Rosa	Italy	17.89			17.89	Q
6	A	Radoslava Mavrodieva	Bulgaria	17.55			17.55	Q
7	A	Anita Márton	Hungary	16.69	16.74	17.30	17.30	q
8	A	Paulina Guba	Poland	16.63	17.29	16.80	17.29	q
9	B	Jessica Cérival	France	16.99	16.75	17.15	17.15	q
10	B	Helena Engman	Sweden	16.88	x	x	16.88	q
11	B	Austra Skujytė	Lithuania	15.68	16.22	16.73	16.73	q
12	A	Anca Heltne	Romania	16.00	16.70	16.33	16.70	q
13	B	Úrsula Ruiz	Spain	16.35	16.24	16.39	16.39	
14	B	Eden Francis	Great Britain	15.83	x	16.35	16.35	
15	A	Julaika Nicoletti	Italy	x	15.94	x	15.94	
16	A	Anastasia Muchkaev	Israel	14.37	x	15.83	15.83	
17	B	Valentina Muzarić	Croatia	14.55	x	15.33	15.33	
18	A	Suvi Helin	Finland	14.69	14.73	15.05	15.05	

=== Final ===
Rank	Athlete	Nationality	#1	#2	#3	#4	#5	#6	Result	Notes
1st place, gold medalist(s)	Nadine Kleinert	Germany	18.58	19.15	19.15	19.18	x	x	19.18	
2nd place, silver medalist(s)	Irina Tarasova	Russia	18.53	18.79	18.91	x	18.54	18.72	18.91	
3rd place, bronze medalist(s)	Chiara Rosa	Italy	x	17.95	17.72	18.26	18.47	18.07	18.47	
4	Josephine Terlecki	Germany	18.33	18.16	x	17.85	x	x	18.33	
5	Christina Schwanitz	Germany	x	18.25	18.10	17.77	x	17.49	18.25	
6	Radoslava Mavrodieva	Bulgaria	18.14	x	17.73	x	17.89	x	18.14	
7	Anita Márton	Hungary	17.19	17.39	17.31	17.48	17.93	17.52	17.93	
8	Helena Engman	Sweden	17.64	17.44	x	17.18	x	x	17.64	SB
9	Jessica Cérival	France	17.20	x	x				17.20	
10	Paulina Guba	Poland	17.09	x	x				17.09	
11	Austra Skujytė	Lithuania	16.53	x	16.50				16.53	
12	Anca Heltne	Romania	16.36	16.39	16.36				16.39	
