= Athletics at the 2009 Summer Universiade – Women's shot put =

The women's shot put event at the 2009 Summer Universiade was held on 11 July.

== Results ==
Rank	Athlete	Nationality	#1	#2	#3	#4	#5	#6	Result	Notes
1st place, gold medalist(s)	Mailín Vargas	Cuba	18.10	18.55	x	x	18.39	18.91	18.91	
2nd place, silver medalist(s)	Chiara Rosa	Italy	17.93	18.12	18.21	18.14	x	x	18.21	
3rd place, bronze medalist(s)	Alena Kopets	Belarus	16.79	17.15	16.62	16.42	17.41	17.48	17.48	
4	Magdalena Sobieszek	Poland	16.02	x	16.25	x	x	16.81	16.81	
5	Filiz Kadoğan	Turkey	16.69	x	x	x	x	x	16.69	SB
6	Úrsula Ruiz	Spain	15.94	15.99	15.36	15.82	16.07	x	16.07	
7	Irina Kirichenko	Russia	15.16	15.72	x	14.82	15.17	15.34	15.72	
8	Evgenia Solovyeva	Russia	15.41	x	14.64	x	x	15.32	15.41	
9	Simoné du Toit	South Africa	x	14.48	14.75				14.75	
10	Hrisi Moisidou	Greece	14.66	14.19	14.43				14.66	
11	Anu Teesaar	Estonia	14.65	14.10	14.31				14.65	
12	Marina Vojinović	Serbia	14.37	14.06	14.35				14.37	
13	Lisa Hughes	United States	12.33	x	13.03				13.03	
	Aweni Adjassa Anwara	Benin							DNS	
