= Anna Omarova =

Russian shot putter (born 1981)

Anna Omarova (born 3 October 1981 in Pyatigorsk) is a Russian shot putter. She represented her country at the Olympic Games in 2008 and at the World Championships in Athletics in 2007 and 2011. In 2007 she won gold medals at the Military World Games and the European Cup.

== Personal bests ==
Her best throw is 19.69 metres, achieved in June 2007 in Munich.

== Doping scandal ==
She was banned for doping for two years in March 2017 after re-analysis of a test from 2011, which resulted in disqualification of her performance at the 2011 World Championships in Athletics.

== International competitions ==
Representing Russia
Year	Competition	Venue	Position	Event	Result	Notes
2007	European Indoor Championships	Birmingham, United Kingdom	6th	Shot put	17.98 m	
2007	European Cup	Munich, Germany	1st	Shot put	19.69 m	PB
2007	World Championships	Osaka, Japan	8th	Shot put	18.20 m	Originally 9th before Nadzeya Astapchuk's disqualification
2007	Military World Games	Hyderabad, India	1st	Shot put	17.78 m	
2008	World Indoor Championships	Valencia, Spain	7th	Shot put	17.75 m	Originally 8th before Nadzeya Astapchuk's disqualification
2008	European Cup Winter Throwing	Split, Croatia	2nd	Shot put	18.38 m	
2008	European Cup	Annecy, France	2nd	Shot put	18.30 m	
2008	Olympic Games	Beijing, China	4th	Shot put	18.44 m	Originally 6th before Nadzeya Astapchuk and Natallia Mikhnevich's disqualifications
2009	European Indoor Championships	Turin, Italy	4th	Shot put	18.37 m	
2009	European Team Championships	Leiria, Portugal	8th	Shot put	16.47 m	
2011	World Championships	Daegu, South Korea	DQ (10th)	Shot put	18.67 m	Doping

== National titles ==
- Russian Athletics Championships
  - Shot put: 2007

== See also ==
- List of doping cases in athletics
