= Jessica Cérival =

French shot putter (born 1982)

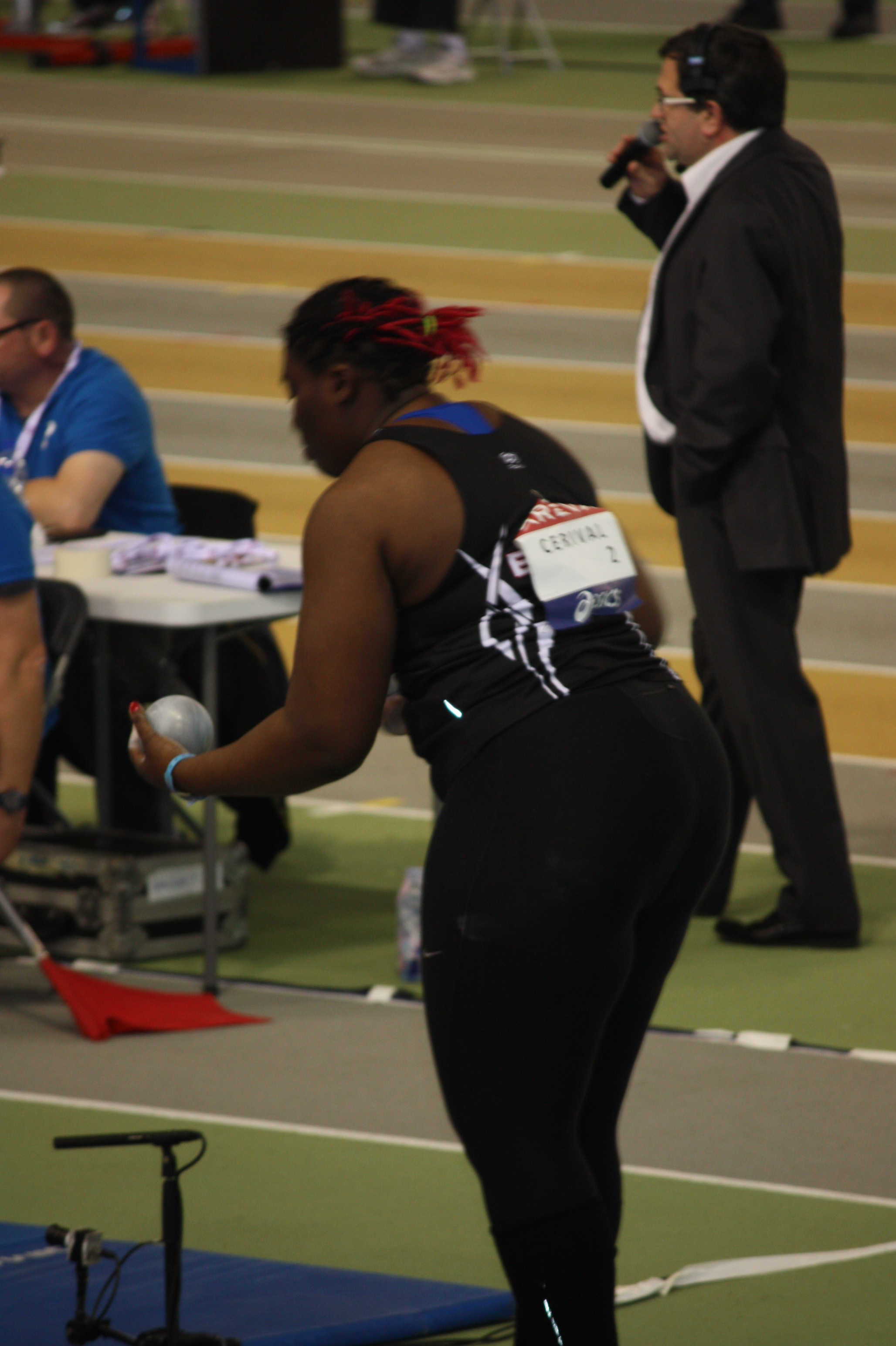
- Jessica Cérival in 2015

Medal record

Women's athletics

Representing France

Mediterranean Games
Gold medal – first place	2009 Pescara	Shot put

Jessica Cérival (born 20 January 1982 in Quimper, Finistère) is a French track and field athlete who specialises in the shot put.

She attended her first major competition in 2007, the 2007 European Athletics Indoor Championships, and she finished seventh overall. She took part in the following edition in 2009 but was knocked out in the qualifying round.

In spite of this, 2009 turned out to be a significant progression for the athlete. She became the French national champion and went on to take the shot put gold at the 2009 Mediterranean Games, becoming the first French women in thirty years to take the title. She was selected for the French team at the 2009 World Championships in Athletics and she finished eleventh.

She closed the year with a silver medal behind Anca Heltne at the 2009 Jeux de la Francophonie. She came fourth at the 2011 European Athletics Indoor Championships and was the silver medallist at the 2011 European Cup Winter Throwing outdoors. She represented France at the 2012 IAAF World Indoor Championships, but did not progress beyond the qualifiers.

== Competition record ==
Year	Competition	Venue	Position	Notes
Representing France
2001	European Junior Championships	Grosseto, Italy	5th	15.21 m
2003	European U23 Championships	Bydgoszcz, Poland	6th	16.30 m
2005	Jeux de la Francophonie	Niamey, Niger	1st	16.32 m
2007	European Indoor Championships	Birmingham, United Kingdom	7th	16.51 m
2007	Universiade	Bangkok, Thailand	5th	16.75 m
2009	European Indoor Championships	Turin, Italy	10th (q)	17.07 m
2009	Mediterranean Games	Pescara, Italy	1st	17.77 m
2009	World Championships	Berlin, Germany	20th (q)	17.30 m
2009	Jeux de la Francophonie	Beirut, Lebanon	2nd	17.14 m
2011	European Indoor Championships	Paris, France	4th	17.84 m
2012	World Indoor Championships	Istanbul, Turkey	14th (q)	16.47 m
2012	European Championships	Helsinki, Finland	9th	17.20 m
2017	European Indoor Championships	Belgrade, Serbia	8th	16.84 m
2017	World Championships	London, United Kingdom	24th (q)	16.56 m
