= Lin Chia-ying =

Taiwanese shot putter (born 1982)

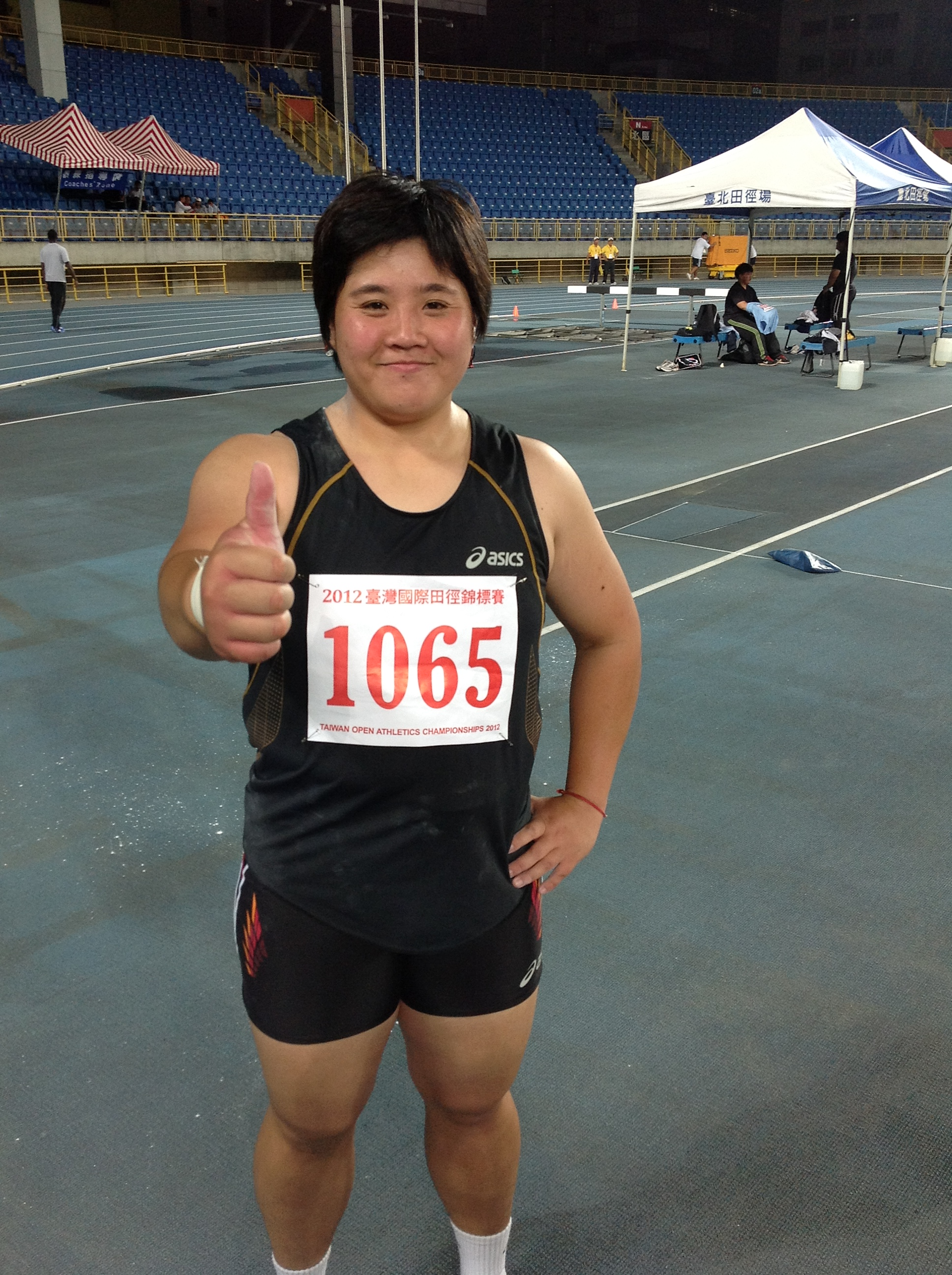
- Chia-Ying Lin in 2012 Taiwan Open Athletics Championships

Personal information
- Born: 5 November 1982 (age 43) Taichung, Taiwan
- Height: 1.68 m (5 ft 6 in)
- Weight: 89 kg (196 lb)

Sport
- Country: Chinese Taipei
- Sport: Athletics
- Event: Shot Put
Medal record
Women's athletics
Representing Chinese Taipei
Asian Championships
Bronze medal – third place	2007 Amman	Shot put
Asian Indoor Championships
Bronze medal – third place	2014 Hangzhou	Shot put

Lin Chia-ying (Chinese: 林家瑩; pinyin: Lín Jiā-yíng; born 5 November 1982) is a Taiwanese shot putter.

== Biography ==
She finished ninth at the 2005 Summer Universiade, eighth at the 2005 Asian Championships and won the bronze medal at the 2006 Asian Games. She also competed at the 2007 World Championships, the 2008 World Indoor Championships, 2008 Olympic Games, the 2012 Olympic Games and the 2014 World Indoor Championships without reaching the final round.

Her personal best throw is 17.48 metres, set at the 2014 Asian Games.

She started to work in National Taiwan Sport University as a throwing coach from 2011 but still acts as an active athlete for TPE team.

== Competition record ==
Year	Competition	Venue	Position	Notes
Representing Chinese Taipei
2005	Universiade	İzmir, Turkey	9th	14.94 m
2005	Asian Championships	Incheon, South Korea	8th	15.21 m
2006	Asian Games	Doha, Qatar	3rd	16.70 m
2007	Asian Championships	Amman, Jordan	3rd	16.46 m
2007	Universiade	Bangkok, Thailand	6th	16.19 m
2007	World Championships	Osaka, Japan	25th (q)	16.41 m
2008	World Indoor Championships	Valencia, Spain	16th (q)	15.77 m
2008	Olympic Games	Beijing, China	28th (q)	16.32 m
2009	Asian Championships	Guangzhou, China	4th	16.18 m
2009	Asian Indoor Games	Hanoi, Vietnam	3rd	16.08 m
2009	East Asian Games	Hong Kong	3rd	15.47 m
2010	Asian Games	Guangzhou, China	4th	17.06 m
2011	Asian Championships	Kobe, Japan	5th	16.17 m
2012	Olympic Games	London, United Kingdom	25th (q)	17.43 m
2013	Asian Championships	Pune, India	6th	16.47 m
2013	East Asian Games	Tianjin, China	2nd	16.95 m
2014	Asian Indoor Championships	Hangzhou, China	3rd	16.52 m
2014	World Indoor Championships	Sopot, Poland	19th (q)	16.31 m
2014	Asian Games	Incheon, South Korea	4th	17.48 m
2015	Asian Championships	Wuhan, China	4th	15.58 m
2018	Asian Games	Jakarta, Indonesia	4th	16.30 m
2019	Asian Championships	Doha, Qatar	6th	15.32 m
