= Athletics at the 2012 Summer Olympics – Women's shot put =

Women's shot put at the Games of the XXX Olympiad
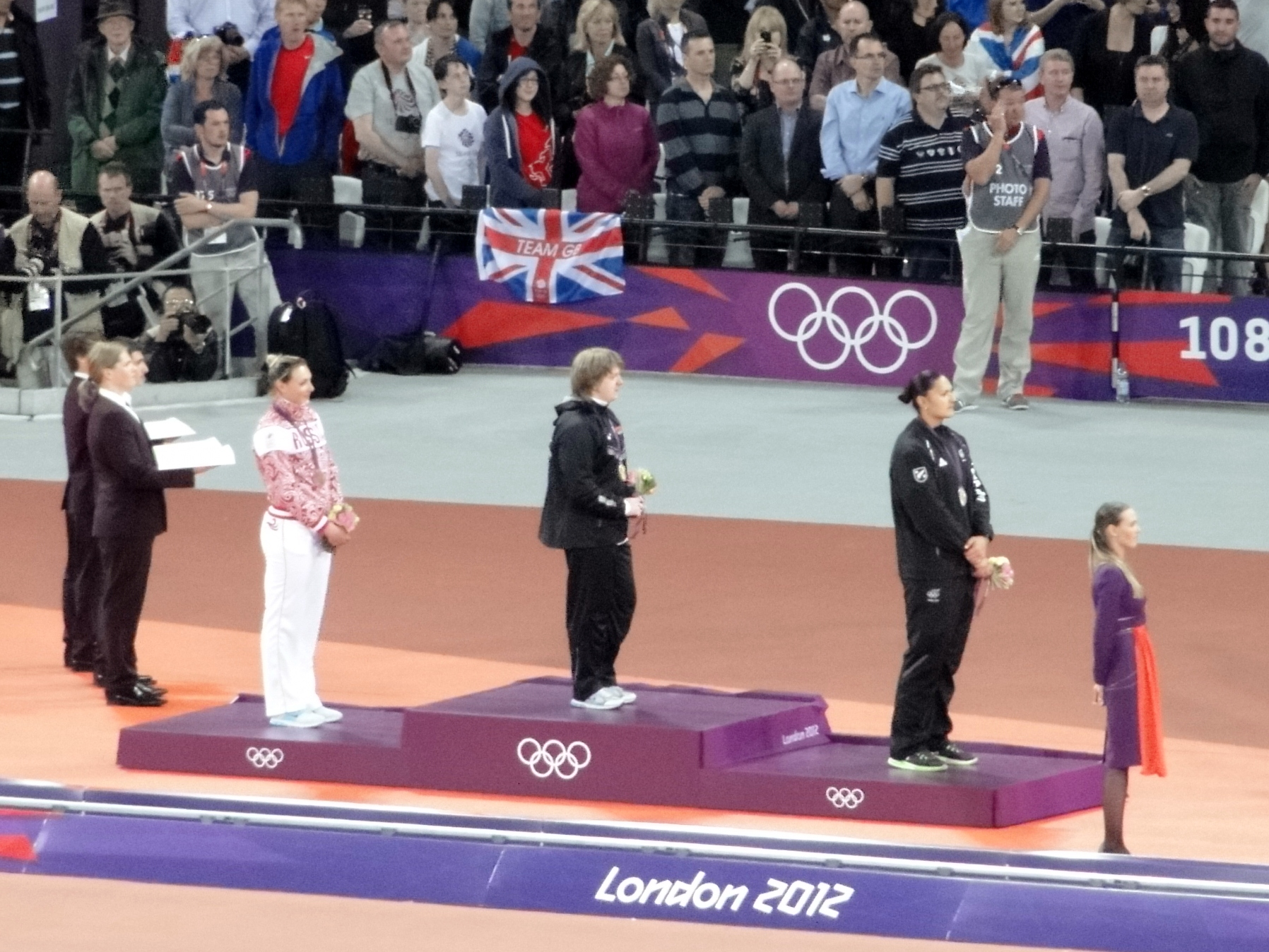
- Shot put medal ceremony (l-r) Yevgeniya Kolodko, Nadzeya Ostapchuk, Valerie Adams — Kolodko and Ostapchuk were consequently stripped their medals due to doping
- Venue: Olympic Stadium
- Date: 6 August
- Competitors: 32 from 21 nations
- Winning distance: 20.70 (originally 21.36)

Medalists
1st place, gold medalist(s)		Valerie Adams	New Zealand
2nd place, silver medalist(s)		Gong Lijiao	China
3rd place, bronze medalist(s)		Li Ling	China

The women's shot put competition at the 2012 Summer Olympics in London, United Kingdom was held at the Olympic Stadium on 6 August.

== Summary ==
Each athlete received three throws in the qualifying round. All who achieved the qualifying distance progressed to the final. If less than twelve athletes would achieve this mark, then the twelve furthest throwing athletes would reach the final. Each finalist was allowed three throws in last round, with the top eight athletes after that point being given three further attempts.

In the finals, Valerie Adams, the defending champion, took the lead in the first throw, but Nadzeya Ostapchuk, who was third in the 2008 Olympic competition, overtook the lead in the second throw and remained the leader until the end of the competition. Gong Lijiao remained third until the last throw, when she was overtaken by Yevgeniya Kolodko. The 2008 silver medalist, Natallia Mikhnevich, qualified for the final, but remained in last place.

On 13 August 2012, IOC announced that Nadzeya Ostapchuk had tested positive for metenolone both before and after winning the shot put event. She was formally expelled from the games and her victory and medal removed from the records. The gold medal was then awarded to Valerie Adams, the silver to Yevgeniya Kolodko, and the bronze to Gong Lijiao.

On 20 August 2016, the IOC announced Yevgeniya Kolodko, the Russian silver medalist, failed anti-doping test and her silver medal was stripped. Gong Lijiao ended up with the silver instead and a compatriot, Li Ling was upgraded to the bronze medal.

== Schedule ==
All times are British Summer Time (UTC+1)

Date	Time	Round
Monday, 6 August 2012	10:45; 19:15	Qualifications; Finals

== Records ==
Prior to the competition, the existing World and Olympic records were as follows.

World record	Natalya Lisovskaya (URS)	22.63 m	Moscow, Soviet Union	7 June 1987
Olympic record	Ilona Slupianek (GDR)	22.41 m	Moscow, Soviet Union	24 July 1980
2012 World leading	Nadzeya Ostapchuk (BLR)	21.58 m	Minsk, Belarus	18 July 2012

== Results ==
=== Qualifying round ===
Qual. rule: qualification standard 18.90m (Q) or at least best 12 qualified (q).

Rank	Group	Name	Nationality	#1	#2	#3	Result	Notes
1	A	Valerie Adams	New Zealand	x	20.40		20.40	Q
2	A	Li Ling	China	18.86	19.23		19.23	Q
3	B	Gong Lijiao	China	19.11			19.11	Q
4	B	Liu Xiangrong	China	18.87	18.96		18.96	Q
5	A	Michelle Carter	United States	18.27	18.63	x	18.63	q
6	A	Christina Schwanitz	Germany	18.44	18.43	18.62	18.62	q
7	B	Natallia Mikhnevich	Belarus	18.60	18.12	18.30	18.60	q
8	B	Geisa Arcanjo	Brazil	x	18.47	18.33	18.47	q
9	B	Natalia Duco	Chile	18.45	18.23	18.17	18.45	q
10	A	Cleopatra Borel-Brown	Trinidad and Tobago	18.26	18.36	18.34	18.36	
11	B	Nadine Kleinert	Germany	x	18.06	18.36	18.36	
12	A	Chiara Rosa	Italy	17.91	18.14	18.30	18.30	
13	A	Jillian Camarena-Williams	United States	18.22	17.99	17.51	18.22	
14	B	Úrsula Ruiz	Spain	17.99	x	x	17.99	PB
15	B	Janina Karolchyk-Pravalinskaya	Belarus	17.68	17.87	17.69	17.87	
16	A	Josephine Terlecki	Germany	17.78	x	17.73	17.78	
17	B	Tia Brooks	United States	17.21	17.72	17.29	17.72	
18	B	Misleydis González	Cuba	17.68	17.61	17.35	17.68	
19	A	Leila Rajabi	Iran	17.17	17.55	17.42	17.55	
20	A	Julie Labonté	Canada	17.48	17.32	x	17.48	
21	A	Anita Márton	Hungary	16.29	17.04	17.48	17.48	
22	A	Anna Avdeyeva	Russia	17.47	x	x	17.47	
23	B	Lin Chia-ying	Chinese Taipei	16.74	17.43	x	17.43	NR
24	A	Mailín Vargas	Cuba	16.76	16.64	x	16.76	
25	A	Sandra Lemos	Colombia	16.50	16.07	x	16.50	
26	B	Alexandra Fisher	Kazakhstan	15.84	16.16	x	16.16	
27	B	'Ana Po'uhila	Tonga	15.80	15.75	15.11	15.80	
28	A	Elena Smolyanova	Uzbekistan	14.35	14.43		14.43	
—	B	Radoslava Mavrodieva	Bulgaria	x	x	x	—	NM
—	A	Nadzeya Ostapchuk	Belarus	~~20.76~~			~~20.76~~	DQ (Doping); ~~Q~~
—	B	Yevgeniya Kolodko	Russia	~~19.31~~			~~19.31~~	DQ (Doping); ~~Q~~
—	B	Irina Tarasova	Russia	~~18.55~~	~~18.59~~	~~18.76~~	~~18.76~~	DQ (Doping); ~~q~~

Notes: Nadzeya Ostapchuk would originally qualify first, with the longest throw, and had taken part in the Final as such. Due to her doping violations, these results were annulled in August 2012. Yevgeniya Kolodko would originally qualify third, with the third longest throw, and had taken part in the Final as such. Due to her doping violations, these results were annulled in August 2016. Irina Tarasova originally qualified in seventh place; her results were annulled by the Athletics Integrity Unit in August 2022.

== Final ==
Rank	Name	Nationality	#1	#2	#3	#4	#5	#6	Result	Notes
1st place, gold medalist(s)	Valerie Adams	New Zealand	20.61	X	20.70	X	X	20.24	20.70	
2nd place, silver medalist(s)	Gong Lijiao	China	20.13	19.67	19.91	19.76	20.22	20.00	20.22	SB
3rd place, bronze medalist(s)	Li Ling	China	18.87	18.77	19.28	X	19.63	19.58	19.63	
4	Michelle Carter	United States	19.05	18.83	18.92	19.42	19.12	18.88	19.42	
5	Liu Xiangrong	China	19.18	18.88	18.74	X	18.47	18.77	19.18	
6	Geisa Arcanjo	Brazil	18.27	X	19.02	X	X	17.19	19.02	PB
7	Natalia Duco	Chile	18.80	18.70	18.62	—	—	—	18.80	NR
8	Christina Schwanitz	Germany	18.20	18.47	X	—	—	—	18.47	
9	Natallia Mikhnevich	Belarus	18.42	X	18.27	—	—	—	18.42	
—	Nadzeya Ostapchuk	Belarus	~~20.01~~	~~21.31~~	~~21.36~~	~~21.15~~	~~21.32~~	~~X~~	~~21.36~~	DQ (Doping)
—	Yevgeniya Kolodko	Russia	~~19.45~~	~~19.52~~	~~X~~	~~X~~	~~X~~	~~20.48~~	~~20.48~~	DQ (Doping)
—	Irina Tarasova	Russia	~~19.00~~	~~18.80~~	~~X~~	—	—	—	~~19.00~~	DQ (Doping)

Notes: Nadzeya Ostapchuk, Yevgeniya Kolodko and Irina Tarasova originally placed first, third and ninth, respectively, but had these results annulled due to doping violations.
