= Mailín Vargas =

Cuban shot putter

Personal information
- Full name: Mailín Vargas Escalona
- Born: March 24, 1983 (age 43) Bartolomé Masó, Granma
- Height: 1.76 m (5 ft 9 1/2 in)
- Weight: 80 kg (176 lb)

Sport
- Country: Cuba
- Sport: Athletics
- Event: Shot Put
Medal record
Summer Universiade
Gold medal – first place	2009 Belgrade	Shot put
CAC Junior Championships (U20)
Gold medal – first place	2002 Bridgetown	Shot put
- Updated on 14 June 2013

Mailín Vargas Escalona (born 24 March 1983 in Bartolomé Masó, Granma) is a Cuban shot putter.

== Career ==
She finished tenth at the 2008 Olympic Games. She achieved a personal best throw of 19.00 metres in July 2008 in Alcalá de Henares. She improved this to 19.02 m in June 2009, winning the Barrientos Memorial in Cuba. In 2011, she improved this further to 19.11 m.

== Personal bests ==
Outdoor

- Shot put: 19.13 m – (Cuba) La Habana, 3 June 2011

Indoor

- Shot put: 18.23 m – (Spain) Valencia, 28 February 2010

== Achievements ==
Year	Competition	Venue	Position	Event	Notes
Representing Cuba
2002	Central American and Caribbean Junior Championships (U-20)	Bridgetown, Barbados	1st	Shot put	14.26 m
2002	World Junior Championships	Kingston, Jamaica	13th (q)	Shot put	14.33 m
2005	ALBA Games	La Habana, Cuba	1st	Shot put	17.30 m
2005	Central American and Caribbean Championships	Nassau, Bahamas	4th	Shot put	16.70 m
2007	ALBA Games	Caracas, Venezuela	2nd	Shot put	18.08 m
2008	Olympic Games	Beijing, China	10th	Shot put	18.28 m
2009	ALBA Games	La Habana, Cuba	1st	Shot put	18.62 m
2009	Universiade	Belgrade, Serbia	1st	Shot put	18.91 m
2009	World Championships	Berlin, Germany	9th	Shot put	18.67 m
2010	World Indoor Championships	Doha, Qatar	15th (q)	Shot put	17.52 m
2011	ALBA Games	Barquisimeto, Venezuela	1st	Shot put	18.77 m
2011	World Championships	Daegu, South Korea	15th (q)	Shot put	18.27 m
2011	Pan American Games	Guadalajara, Mexico	4th	Shot put	17.98 m
2012	Olympic Games	London, United Kingdom	26th	Shot put	16.76 m
