= 2005 European Athletics U23 Championships – Women's shot put =

The women's shot put event at the 2005 European Athletics U23 Championships was held in Erfurt, Germany, at Steigerwaldstadion on 16 July.

== Medalists ==
Gold	Petra Lammert; Germany
Silver	Christina Schwanitz; Germany
Bronze	Chiara Rosa; Italy

== Results ==
=== Final ===
16 July

Rank	Name	Nationality	Attempts						Result	Notes
Rank	Name	Nationality	1	2	3	4	5	6	Result	Notes
1st place, gold medalist(s)	Petra Lammert	Germany	17.97	x	18.97	17.87	x	17.96	18.97	
2nd place, silver medalist(s)	Christina Schwanitz	Germany	17.45	x	x	18.17	18.64	18.54	18.64	
3rd place, bronze medalist(s)	Chiara Rosa	Italy	x	17.72	18.16	18.22	x	x	18.22	
4	Yulia Leantsiuk	Belarus	17.91	17.54	16.77	17.09	x	17.07	17.91	
5	Kristin Marten	Germany	17.61	17.29	17.43	17.50	x	x	17.61	
6	Anna Avdeyeva	Russia	16.24	16.52	x	x	x	–	16.52	
7	Tatsiana Ilyushchanka	Belarus	16.03	16.49	x	16.24	16.31	x	16.49	
8	Sivan Jean	Israel	15.75	x	15.86	15.84	15.39	15.79	15.86	
9	Rebecca Peake	United Kingdom	x	15.44	14.27				15.44	
10	Marie-Patrice Calabre	France	14.77	x	15.07				15.07	
11	Maria Antónia Borges	Portugal	14.72	14.94	14.51				14.94	
12	Úrsula Ruiz	Spain	x	14.20	14.89				14.89	

== Participation ==
According to an unofficial count, 12 athletes from 9 countries participated in the event.

- Belarus (2)
- France (1)
- Germany (3)
- Israel (1)
- Italy (1)
- Portugal (1)
- Russia (1)
- Spain (1)
- United Kingdom (1)
