= Denise Hinrichs =

German shot putter

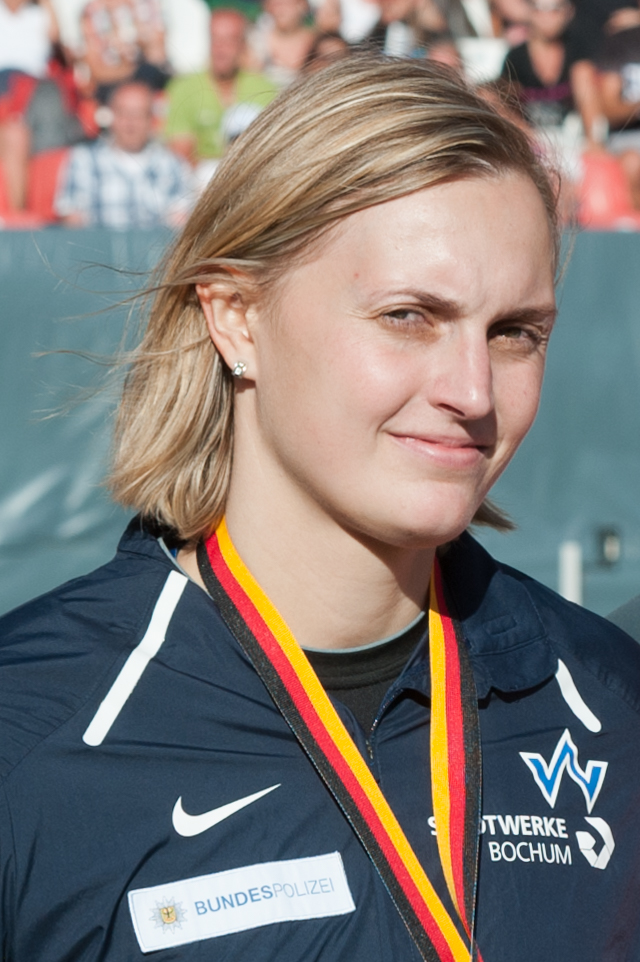
- Hinrichs in 2015

Personal information
- Born: 7 June 1987 (age 39) Rostock, East Germany
- Height: 180 cm (5 ft 11 in)
- Weight: 79 kg (174 lb)
Medal record
Women's athletics
Representing Germany
European Indoor Championships
Silver medal – second place	2009 Turin	Shot put

Denise Hinrichs (born 7 June 1987 in Rostock, East Germany) is a German shot putter. Her personal best is 19.07 metres, achieved in May 2008 in Halle, Saxony-Anhalt. She competed at the 2008 Summer Olympics.

== Achievements ==
Year	Competition	Venue	Position	Event	Notes
Representing Germany
2003	World Youth Championships	Sherbrooke, Canada	4th	Shot put	15.08 m
2005	European Junior Championships	Kaunas, Lithuania	1st	Shot put	17.55 m
2006	World Junior Championships	Beijing, China	2nd	Shot put	17.35 m
2007	European U23 Championships	Debrecen, Hungary	2nd	Shot put	17.56 m
2008	World Indoor Championships	Valencia, Spain	9th (q)	Shot put	18.25 m
2008	Olympic Games	Beijing, China	16th (q)	Shot put	18.36 m
2009	European Indoor Championships	Torino, Italy	2nd	Shot put	19.63 m
2009	European U23 Championships	Kaunas, Lithuania	1st	Shot put	19.18 m
2009	World Championships	Berlin, Germany	11th	Shot put	18.39 m
2010	European Championships	Barcelona, Spain	8th	Shot put	18.48 m
2015	European Indoor Championships	Prague, Czech Republic	6th	Shot put	17.35 m
