= Athletics at the 2003 Summer Universiade – Women's shot put =

The women's shot put event at the 2003 Summer Universiade was held on 26 August in Daegu, South Korea.

== Results ==
Rank	Athlete	Nationality	#1	#2	#3	#4	#5	#6	Result	Notes
1st place, gold medalist(s)	Li Fengfeng	China	18.55	18.02	18.46	17.84	18.11	x	18.55	
2nd place, silver medalist(s)	Lee Myung-Sun	South Korea	17.37	17.58	17.54	x	17.43	x	17.58	
3rd place, bronze medalist(s)	Yelena Ivanenko	Belarus	16.80	17.29	x	16.76	16.55	–	17.29	
4	Maranelle du Toit	South Africa	16.16	16.90	16.58	16.44	x	16.23	16.90	
5	Natallia Kharaneka	Belarus	15.78	16.82	x	15.87	16.55	16.80	16.82	
6	Helena Engman	Sweden	x	15.35	15.36	15.93	15.99	15.73	15.99	
7	Kate Forbes	Canada	15.39	15.03	x	14.68	x	14.89	15.39	
8	Caroline Larose	Canada	13.50	13.97	14.24	14.17	14.82	13.82	14.82	
9	Tereapii Tapoki	Cook Islands	x	12.98	14.12				14.12	
10	Nadeeka Muthunayake	Sri Lanka	11.36	11.11	10.74				11.36	
11	Vika Koloa	Tonga	x	11.20	10.46				11.20	
	Brigitte Traoré	Burkina Faso							DNS	
