= 2000 World Junior Championships in Athletics – Women's shot put =

The women's shot put event at the 2000 World Junior Championships in Athletics was held in Santiago, Chile, at Estadio Nacional Julio Martínez Prádanos on 17 October.

== Medalists ==
Gold	Kathleen Kluge; Germany
Silver	Li Meiju; China
Bronze	Natallia Khoroneko; Belarus

== Results ==
=== Final ===
17 October

Rank	Name	Nationality	Attempts						Result	Notes
Rank	Name	Nationality	1	2	3	4	5	6	Result	Notes
1st place, gold medalist(s)	Kathleen Kluge	Germany	16.46	16.14	x	16.62	16.84	17.37	17.37	
2nd place, silver medalist(s)	Li Meiju	China	16.30	16.07	16.11	x	15.67	16.57	16.57	
3rd place, bronze medalist(s)	Natallia Khoroneko	Belarus	16.00	15.24	15.83	16.40	16.02	15.78	16.40	
4	Laura Gerraughty	United States	14.86	14.40	15.71	15.32	14.70	15.30	15.71	
5	Anna Tolokina	Russia	x	15.42	x	x	x	14.92	15.42	
6	Lucia Korceková	Slovakia	15.00	x	15.07	15.30	x	x	15.30	
7	Claudia Villeneuve	France	15.09	x	14.52	x	x	x	15.09	
8	Kamila Hlavácová	Czech Republic	14.73	x	14.98	14.65	14.96	14.92	14.98	
9	Jessica Cosby	United States	14.93	13.60	x				14.93	
10	Fernanda Resende	Brazil	13.97	13.77	14.87				14.87	
11	Ludmila Lisii	Moldova	14.02	14.33	14.83				14.83	
12	Chiara Rosa	Italy	14.61	x	14.12				14.61	
13	Gaëlle Eleleara	France	12.87	14.14	x				14.14	
14	Margaríta Palasiou	Greece	13.91	12.71	12.11				13.91	
15	Evaggelía Gávali	Greece	13.00	13.45	12.63				13.45	

== Participation ==
According to an unofficial count, 15 athletes from 12 countries participated in the event.

- Belarus (1)
- Brazil (1)
- China (1)
- Czech Republic (1)
- France (2)
- Germany (1)
- Greece (2)
- Italy (1)
- Moldova (1)
- Russia (1)
- Slovakia (1)
- United States (2)
