= Gong Lijiao =

Chinese Olympic shot putter

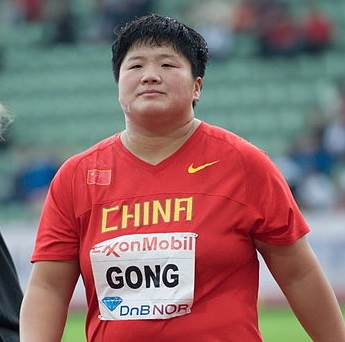
- Gong in 2011

Personal information
- Nationality: Chinese
- Born: 24 January 1989 (age 37) Luquan, Shijiazhuang, Hebei, China
- Education: University of Science and Technology Beijing
- Height: 1.75 m (5 ft 9 in)
- Weight: 108 kg (238 lb)

Sport
- Country: China
- Sport: Athletics
- Event: Shot put
- Coached by: Li Meisu
Medal record
Women's athletics
Representing China
Olympic Games
Gold medal – first place	2020 Tokyo	Shot put
Silver medal – second place	2012 London	Shot put
Bronze medal – third place	2008 Beijing	Shot put
World Championships
Gold medal – first place	2017 London	Shot put
Gold medal – first place	2019 Doha	Shot put
Silver medal – second place	2015 Beijing	Shot put
Silver medal – second place	2022 Eugene	Shot put
Bronze medal – third place	2009 Berlin	Shot put
Bronze medal – third place	2011 Daegu	Shot put
Bronze medal – third place	2013 Moscow	Shot put
Bronze medal – third place	2023 Budapest	Shot put
World Indoor Championships
Bronze medal – third place	2014 Sopot	Shot put
Bronze medal – third place	2018 Birmingham	Shot put
Asian Games
Gold medal – first place	2014 Incheon	Shot put
Gold medal – first place	2018 Jakarta-Palembang	Shot put
Gold medal – first place	2022 Hangzhou	Shot put
Silver medal – second place	2010 Guangzhou	Shot put
Asian Indoor Championships
Gold medal – first place	2008 Doha	Shot put
Continental Cup
Representing Asia-Pacific
Gold medal – first place	2018 Ostrava	Shot put
Bronze medal – third place	2010 Split	Shot put
Bronze medal – third place	2014 Marrakech	Shot put

Gong Lijiao (Chinese: 巩立姣; pinyin: Gǒng Lìjiāo; born 24 January 1989) is a Chinese former Olympic shot putter and the 2020 Olympic champion in that event. A five-time Olympic player and a three-time Olympic medalist, she holds a record eight successive medals at the World Athletics Championships, including two world titles.

In her five-time Olympic Games, she won a gold, a silver, a bronze medal, a fourth place, and a fifth place.

== Career ==
She finished seventh at the 2007 World Championships, her international debut. At the 2008 Summer Olympics she finished fifth but received the bronze medal later after two competitors were stripped of their medals because of doping violations.

She set a personal best throw of 19.46 metres in the qualifying round of the 2008 Olympics; this was the furthest mark for a female Chinese shot putter for over a decade. At the 2009 National Games of China, Gong further improved her personal best to 19.82 m, taking her to tenth place on the all-time Chinese shot putter's list.

She won the bronze medal at the 2009 World Championships in Berlin with a personal best of 19.89 metres.

She won the gold medal at the 2009 National Games of China in Jinan with a personal best of 20.35 metres.

She won the gold medal at the 2009 Asian Athletics Championships in Guangzhou with a personal best of 19.04 metres.

Gong initially finished fourth in the London 2012 Summer Olympics, but was retroactively awarded the bronze medal after the winner, Nadzeya Astapchuk, was disqualified for failing a drug test. On 20 August 2016, the IOC announced that Yevgeniya Kolodko, the Russian silver medalist, failed an anti-doping test and Gong was therefore upgraded to the silver.

In 2018, Gong won the gold medal in women's shot put during the 18th Asian Games in Jakarta, Indonesia.

In 2021, she won the gold medal in women's shot put at the 2020 Summer Olympics In Tokyo with her personal best of 20.58 m, thereby becoming the first Chinese athlete to be crowned the Olympic champion in any field event and the first athlete from Asia to win an Olympic gold medal in women's shot put.

At the 2023 World Athletic Championships, Gong won the bronze medal after tying Portuguese thrower Auriol Dongmo's best throw of 19.69 metres and prevailing on countback. This was her eighth World medal, breaking Ezekiel Kemboi's record for the most medals by an athlete at the championships.

In 2024, Gong participated the women's shot put event in the 2024 Summer Olympics, and became a fifth-time Olympic player. She finished the fifth in the final with a distance of 19.27m.

In November 2025, Gong won her record-breaking fifth consecutive national title at the 2025 National Games of China, after a throw of 19.68m. Soon, she announced her retirement in an interview.

== International competitions ==
Year	Competition	Venue	Position	Notes
Representing China
2007	World Championships	Osaka, Japan	6th	18.66 m
2008	Asian Indoor Championships	Doha, Qatar	1st	18.12 m
2008	Olympic Games	Beijing, China	3rd	19.20 m
2009	World Championships	Berlin, Germany	3rd	19.89 m
2009	Asian Championships	Guangzhou, China	1st	19.04 m
2010	World Indoor Championships	Doha, Qatar	6th	18.64 m
2010	Continental Cup	Split, Croatia	2nd	20.13 m
2010	Asian Games	Guangzhou, China	2nd	19.67 m
2011	World Championships	Daegu, South Korea	3rd	19.97 m
2012	Olympic Games	London, United Kingdom	2nd	20.22 m
2013	World Championships	Moscow, Russia	3rd	19.95 m
2014	World Indoor Championships	Sopot, Poland	3rd	19.24 m
2014	Continental Cup	Marrakesh, Morocco	1st	19.23 m
2014	Asian Games	Incheon, South Korea	1st	19.06 m
2015	World Championships	Beijing, China	2nd	20.30 m
2016	Olympic Games	Rio de Janeiro, Brazil	4th	19.39 m
2017	World Championships	London, United Kingdom	1st	19.94 m
2018	World Indoor Championships	Birmingham, United Kingdom	3rd	19.08 m
2018	Asian Games	Jakarta, Indonesia	1st	19.66 m
2018	Continental Cup	Ostrava, Czech Republic	1st	19.63 m
2019	Asian Championships	Doha, Qatar	1st	19.18 m
2019	World Championships	Doha, Qatar	1st	19.55 m
2021	Olympic Games	Tokyo, Japan	1st	20.58 m PB
2022	World Championships	Eugene, United States	2nd	20.39 m
2023	World Championships	Budapest, Hungary	3rd	19.69 m
2023	Asian Games	Hangzhou, China	1st	19.58 m
2024	Olympic Games	Paris, France	5th	19.27 m
2025	World Indoor Championships	Nanjing, China	5th	18.84 m
2025	World Championships	Tokyo, Japan	9th	18.96 m
