= 2003 European Athletics U23 Championships – Women's shot put =

The women's shot put event at the 2003 European Athletics U23 Championships was held in Bydgoszcz, Poland, at Zawisza Stadion on 19 July.

== Medalists ==
Gold	Natallia Khoroneko; Belarus
Silver	Kathleen Kluge; Germany
Bronze	Filiz Kadoğan; Turkey

== Results ==
=== Final ===
19 July

Rank	Name	Nationality	Attempts						Result	Notes
Rank	Name	Nationality	1	2	3	4	5	6	Result	Notes
1st place, gold medalist(s)	Natallia Khoroneko	Belarus	17.41	17.66	17.39	x	x	17.33	17.66	
2nd place, silver medalist(s)	Kathleen Kluge	Germany	17.09	x	16.98	16.78	16.78	16.79	17.09	
3rd place, bronze medalist(s)	Filiz Kadoğan	Turkey	16.38	16.37	16.45	16.72	16.60	16.17	16.72	
4	Chiara Rosa	Italy	15.98	15.77	x	16.08	16.49	x	16.49	
5	Anja Burkhardt	Germany	15.38	15.08	16.31	x	16.30	x	16.31	
6	Jessica Cérival	France	x	14.72	16.30	x	x	16.21	16.30	
7	Kristin Marten	Germany	15.87	x	x	15.83	16.05	x	16.05	
8	Jana Kárníková	Czech Republic	15.65	x	x	x	x	x	15.65	
9	Joanna Rożko	Poland	14.27	15.09	15.54				15.54	
10	Úrsula Ruiz	Spain	15.44	x	14.93				15.44	
11	Magdalena Dzierzęcka	Poland	13.88	14.92	15.07				15.07	
12	Rasa Austytė	Lithuania	14.21	x	14.68				14.68	
13	Agnieszka Maciąg	Poland	13.76	13.84	14.34				14.34	
14	Tatyana Ilyushchenko	Belarus	x	13.70	11.60				13.70	

== Participation ==
According to an unofficial count, 14 athletes from 9 countries participated in the event.

- Belarus (2)
- Czech Republic (1)
- France (1)
- Germany (3)
- Italy (1)
- Lithuania (1)
- Poland (3)
- Spain (1)
- Turkey (1)
