= 2002 World Junior Championships in Athletics – Women's shot put =

The women's shot put event at the 2002 World Junior Championships in Athletics was held in Kingston, Jamaica, at National Stadium on 19 and 20 July.

== Medalists ==
Gold	Valerie Adams; New Zealand
Silver	Zhang Ying; China
Bronze	Laura Gerraughty; United States

== Results ==
=== Final ===
20 July

Rank	Name	Nationality	Attempts						Result	Notes
Rank	Name	Nationality	1	2	3	4	5	6	Result	Notes
1st place, gold medalist(s)	Valerie Adams	New Zealand	17.73	x	17.58	x	16.94	17.30	17.73	
2nd place, silver medalist(s)	Zhang Ying	China	15.62	16.44	16.76	16.38	16.19	x	16.76	
3rd place, bronze medalist(s)	Laura Gerraughty	United States	16.56	x	16.62	x	x	16.28	16.62	
4	Chiara Rosa	Italy	15.60	15.55	16.53	16.53	16.38	16.25	16.53	
5	Tatyana Ilyushchenko	Belarus	15.34	x	15.95	16.05	16.18	15.45	16.18	
6	Kristin Marten	Germany	x	15.80	16.07	x	x	15.91	16.07	
7	Yuliya Leontyuk	Belarus	x	16.03	15.41	14.98	15.03	14.52	16.03	
8	Anna Avdeyeva	Russia	15.83	15.66	x	x	15.74	15.22	15.83	
9	Claudia Villeneuve	France	15.33	15.03	15.55				15.55	
10	Ursula Ruíz	Spain	14.96	x	14.59				14.96	
11	Julia Wiechmann	Germany	13.97	14.90	14.80				14.90	
12	Briona Reynolds	United States	14.58	x	14.86				14.86	

=== Qualifications ===
19 Jul

==== Group A ====
Rank	Name	Nationality	Attempts			Result	Notes
Rank	Name	Nationality	1	2	3	Result	Notes
1	Valerie Adams	New Zealand	17.17	-	-	17.17	Q
2	Laura Gerraughty	United States	17.08	-	-	17.08	Q
3	Kristin Marten	Germany	16.18	-	-	16.18	Q
4	Anna Avdeyeva	Russia	15.63	-	-	15.63	Q
5	Tatyana Ilyushchenko	Belarus	15.60	-	-	15.60	Q
6	Chiara Rosa	Italy	14.40	15.49	-	15.49	Q
7	Zhang Ying	China	15.43	-	-	15.43	Q
8	Yuliya Leontyuk	Belarus	x	15.32	-	15.32	Q
9	Claudia Villeneuve	France	14.01	15.07	-	15.07	Q
10	Julia Wiechmann	Germany	14.47	15.02	-	15.02	Q
11	Briona Reynolds	United States	14.57	14.85	14.68	14.85	q
12	Ursula Ruíz	Spain	x	14.16	14.66	14.66	q
13	Mailín Vargas	Cuba	14.04	14.32	14.33	14.33	
14	Hrisí Moisídou	Greece	13.76	14.05	13.46	14.05	
15	Ahymará Espinoza	Venezuela	13.83	12.64	12.97	13.83	
16	Ivana Baršic	Croatia	13.36	13.63	x	13.63	
17	Mariam Kevkhishvili	Georgia	13.31	13.48	13.05	13.48	
18	Denise Kemkers	Netherlands	13.33	12.39	13.13	13.33	
19	Kaia Durrant-Nairne	Jamaica	10.46	x	x	10.46	

== Participation ==
According to an unofficial count, 19 athletes from 16 countries participated in the event.

- Belarus (2)
- China (1)
- Croatia (1)
- Cuba (1)
- France (1)
- Georgia (1)
- Germany (2)
- Greece (1)
- Italy (1)
- Jamaica (1)
- Netherlands (1)
- New Zealand (1)
- Russia (1)
- Spain (1)
- United States (2)
- Venezuela (1)
