= 2009 European Athletics U23 Championships – Women's shot put =

The women's shot put event at the 2009 European Athletics U23 Championships was held in Kaunas, Lithuania, at S. Dariaus ir S. Girėno stadionas (Darius and Girėnas Stadium) on 17 July.

== Medalists ==
Gold	Denise Hinrichs; Germany
Silver	Irina Tarasova; Russia
Bronze	Alena Kopets; Belarus

== Results ==
=== Final ===
17 July

Rank	Name	Nationality	Attempts						Result	Notes
Rank	Name	Nationality	1	2	3	4	5	6	Result	Notes
1st place, gold medalist(s)	Denise Hinrichs	Germany	18.73	x	18.88	19.18	18.82	18.73	19.18	
2nd place, silver medalist(s)	Irina Tarasova	Russia	17.18	17.90	17.74	17.33	17.48	x	17.90	
3rd place, bronze medalist(s)	Alena Kopets	Belarus	x	16.19	16.56	17.37	16.95	17.72	17.72	
4	Melissa Boekelman	Netherlands	17.37	16.90	17.37	x	x	x	17.37	
5	Anita Márton	Hungary	16.27	15.92	16.01	16.49	17.20	16.47	17.20	
6	Eden Francis	United Kingdom	15.09	15.67	16.23	x	15.93	x	16.23	
7	Agnieszka Dudzińska	Poland	15.41	15.50	15.66	15.59	x	15.83	15.83	
8	Julaika Nicoletti	Italy	14.22	15.22	15.09	14.40	14.65	14.19	15.22	
9	Kelly Closse	France	x	x	14.89				14.89	
10	Myriam Lixfe	France	14.88	14.74	14.27				14.88	
11	Florentia Kappa	Cyprus	14.16	14.56	14.10				14.56	
12	Johanna Pulkkinen	Finland	x	14.41	x				14.41	
13	Virmantė Vaičekonytė	Lithuania	14.06	13.47	13.85				14.06	
14	Elena Carini	Italy	13.59	x	13.79				13.79	

== Participation ==
According to an unofficial count, 14 athletes from 12 countries participated in the event.

- Belarus (1)
- Cyprus (1)
- Finland (1)
- France (2)
- Germany (1)
- Hungary (1)
- Italy (2)
- Lithuania (1)
- Netherlands (1)
- Poland (1)
- Russia (1)
- United Kingdom (1)
