= 2007 European Athletics U23 Championships – Women's shot put =

The women's shot put event at the 2007 European Athletics U23 Championships was held in Debrecen, Hungary, at Gyulai István Atlétikai Stadion on 12 July.

== Medalists ==
Gold	Irina Tarasova; Russia
Silver	Denise Hinrichs; Germany
Bronze	Anna Avdeyeva; Russia

== Results ==
=== Final ===
12 July

Rank	Name	Nationality	Attempts						Result	Notes
Rank	Name	Nationality	1	2	3	4	5	6	Result	Notes
1st place, gold medalist(s)	Irina Tarasova	Russia	18.26	17.52	x	17.34	17.79	x	18.26	
2nd place, silver medalist(s)	Denise Hinrichs	Germany	17.56	17.31	17.03	17.06	17.13	x	17.56	
3rd place, bronze medalist(s)	Anna Avdeyeva	Russia	x	17.46	x	x	17.47	16.19	17.47	
4	Denise Kemkers	Netherlands	16.87	16.76	16.40	x	x	17.21	17.21	
5	Magdalena Sobieszek	Poland	16.77	x	x	16.59	16.76	x	16.77	
6	Josephine Terlecki	Germany	15.68	16.40	16.27	x	16.53	16.37	16.53	
7	Irina Kirichenko	Russia	16.23	x	x	x	x	15.55	16.23	
8	Catherine Timmermans	Belgium	15.35	15.75	15.31	15.28	x	15.26	15.75	
9	Tatsiana Varabei	Belarus	15.14	15.47	15.24				15.47	
10	Izabela Koralewska	Poland	14.20	14.90	x				14.90	
11	Charlotte Lund Abrahamsen	Norway	x	14.89	x				14.89	
12	Alina Vaišvilaitė	Lithuania	x	14.09	14.71				14.71	

=== Qualifications ===
12 July
Qualifying 15.20 or 12 best to the Final

==== Group A ====
Rank	Name	Nationality	Result	Notes
1	Anna Avdeyeva	Russia	17.31	Q
2	Magdalena Sobieszek	Poland	16.49	Q
3	Josephine Terlecki	Germany	15.25	Q
4	Irina Kirichenko	Russia	15.22	Q
5	Izabela Koralewska	Poland	15.17	q
6	Alina Vaišvilaitė	Lithuania	14.81	q
7	Suvi Helin	Finland	14.75	
8	Carolina Hjelt	Sweden	14.62	
9	Zacharoula Georgiadou	Cyprus	13.95	

==== Group B ====
Rank	Name	Nationality	Result	Notes
1	Denise Hinrichs	Germany	16.68	Q
2	Irina Tarasova	Russia	16.52	Q
3	Denise Kemkers	Netherlands	16.46	Q
4	Catherine Timmermans	Belgium	15.56	Q
5	Tatsiana Varabei	Belarus	15.46	Q
6	Charlotte Lund Abrahamsen	Norway	15.10	q
7	Agnieszka Bronisz	Poland	14.57	
8	Johanna Pulkkinen	Finland	14.09	

== Participation ==
According to an unofficial count, 17 athletes from 11 countries participated in the event.

- Belarus (1)
- Belgium (1)
- Cyprus (1)
- Finland (2)
- Germany (2)
- Lithuania (1)
- Netherlands (1)
- Norway (1)
- Poland (3)
- Russia (3)
- Sweden (1)
