= Mariam Kevkhishvili =

Georgian shot putter (born 1985)

Personal information
- Nickname: "Marie"
- National team: Georgia
- Born: September 17, 1985 (age 40) Tbilisi, Georgia SSR, Soviet Union
- Height: 6 ft 3 in (1.91 m)
- Weight: 240 lb (110 kg)

Sport
- Sport: Track and field
- Event: Shot put
- College team: University of Florida
- Coached by: Yaraman Sabanashvili, Steve Lemke

Mariam Kevkhishvili Machavariani (Georgian: მარიამ ქევხიშვილი; born 17 September 1985) is a Georgian shot putter.

Kevkhishvili attended the University of Florida in Gainesville, Florida, where she was a member of coach Mike Holloway's Florida Gators track and field team. She graduated from the university with a bachelor's degree in sociology in 2011.

She finished tenth at the 2005 Summer Universiade. In addition she competed at the Olympic Games in 2004 and 2008 without reaching the final round.

Her personal best throw is 17.60 metres, achieved in April 2008 in Gainesville, Florida. She has 17.83 metres on the indoor track, achieved in March 2008 in Fayetteville, Arkansas.

== Competition record ==
Year	Competition	Venue	Position	Notes
Representing Georgia
2002	World Junior Championships	Kingston, Jamaica	17th (q)	13.48 m
2003	European Junior Championships	Tampere, Finland	6th	14.81 m
2004	World Junior Championships	Grosseto, Italy	16th (q)	14.96 m
2004	Olympic Games	Athens, Greece	34th (q)	15.06 m
2005	Universiade	İzmir, Turkey	10th	14.71 m
2009	World Championships	Berlin, Germany	14th (q)	17.95 m
2010	European Championships	Barcelona, Spain	10th	17.87 m
2013	European Indoor Championships	Gothenburg, Sweden	14th (q)	16.66 m

== See also ==
- Florida Gators
- List of University of Florida alumni
- List of University of Florida Olympians
