= Olga Ivanova (athlete) =

Russian shot putter (born 1979)

Olga Viktorovna Ivanova (Russian: Ольга Викторовна Иванова; born 6 January 1979) is a Russian shot putter. Her personal best throw is 19.48 metres, achieved in July 2008 in Tula.

She finished seventh at the 2005 European Indoor Championships and seventh at the 2008 Olympic Games. She also competed at the 2005 World Championships and the 2006 World Indoor Championships without reaching the final round.

Initially fifth at the 2010 European Championships, she won the bronze medal after two disqualifications for doping of Nadzeya Ostapchuk and Natallia Mikhnevich.

== Achievements ==
Year	Competition	Venue	Position	Event	Notes
Representing Russia
2010	European Championships	Barcelona, Spain	3rd	Shot put	19.02 m
