= 2009 World Championships in Athletics – Women's shot put =

The women's shot put at the 2009 World Championships in Athletics was held at the Olympic Stadium on August 16. Having set a world-leading and Oceanian record of 20.69 m in May, Valerie Vili was a strong favourite and defending champion. The seven best marks of the season all belonged to Vili, and only Anna Avdeyeva and Natallia Mikhnevich had thrown further than twenty metres that season. Former world champion Nadezhda Ostapchuk, Olympic medallist Nadine Kleinert and Gong Lijiao were other athletes who had a chance of reaching the podium.

Home competitor Kleinert took an early lead with a new personal best of 20.06 m. In the second round, Gong moved up into second place with 19.89 m, a personal best that eventually won her the bronze medal. Vili responded with 20.25 m in the third round, and Kleinert also improved to 20.20 m. Vili proved superior, however, throwing over twenty metres three more times and finishing with a best of 20.44 m. This gave Vili her second World Championships gold medal. Avdeyeva and Mikhnevich rounded out the top five, both with 19.66 m marks.

== Medalists ==
Gold	Valerie Vili; New Zealand (NZL)
Silver	Nadine Kleinert; Germany (GER)
Bronze	Gong Lijiao; China (CHN)

== Records ==
World record	Natalya Lisovskaya (URS)	22.63	Moscow, Soviet Union	7 June 1987
Championship record	Natalya Lisovskaya (URS)	21.24	Rome, Italy	5 September 1987
World leading	Valerie Vili (NZL)	20.69	Rio de Janeiro, Brazil	17 May 2009
African record	Vivian Chukwuemeka (NGR)	18.35	Ijebu Ode, Nigeria	17 April 2006
Asian record	Li Meisu (CHN)	21.76	Shijiazhuang, China	23 April 1988
North American record	Belsy Laza (CUB)	20.96	Mexico City, Mexico	2 May 1992
South American record	Elisângela Adriano (BRA)	19.30	Tunja, Colombia	14 July 2001
European Record	Natalya Lisovskaya (URS)	22.63	Moscow, Soviet Union	7 June 1987
Oceanian Record	Valerie Vili (NZL)	20.69	Rio de Janeiro, Brazil	17 May 2009

== Qualification standards ==
A standard	B standard
18.20m	17.20m

== Schedule ==
Date	Time	Round
August 16, 2009	10:05	Qualification
August 16, 2009	20:20	Final

== Results ==
=== Qualification ===
Qualification: Qualifying Performance 18.50 (Q) or at least 12 best performers (q) advance to the final.

Rank	Group	Athlete	Nationality	#1	#2	#3	Result	Notes
1	B	Valerie Vili	New Zealand	19.70			19.70	Q
2	B	Nadine Kleinert	Germany	18.38	x	19.36	19.36	Q
3	A	Natallia Mikhnevich	Belarus	19.12			19.12	Q
4	B	Gong Lijiao	China	19.08			19.08	Q
5	A	Anna Avdeyeva	Russia	18.45	18.31	18.92	18.92	Q
6	A	Denise Hinrichs	Germany	18.69			18.69	Q
7	B	Misleydis González	Cuba	18.62			18.62	Q
8	A	Li Meiju	China	18.53			18.53	Q
9	B	Michelle Carter	United States	17.43	18.07	18.44	18.44	q
10	A	Christina Schwanitz	Germany	18.25	x	18.11	18.25	q
11	A	Mailín Vargas	Cuba	18.14	17.95	17.98	18.14	q
12	B	Liu Xiangrong	China	x	17.97	18.10	18.10	q
13	B	Cleopatra Borel-Brown	Trinidad and Tobago	17.19	17.31	17.99	17.99	
14	B	Mariam Kevkhishvili	Georgia	17.95	17.68	17.75	17.95	
15	A	Anca Heltne	Romania	17.92	17.82	17.69	17.92	
16	A	Chiara Rosa	Italy	17.89	x	x	17.89	
17	A	Austra Skujytė	Lithuania	x	17.52	17.86	17.86	PB
18	B	Yaniuvis López	Cuba	17.71	17.65	x	17.71	
19	B	Natalia Duco	Chile	17.61	17.45	17.43	17.61	
20	B	Jessica Cérival	France	17.06	16.90	17.30	17.30	
21	A	Laurence Manfredi	France	17.04	x	17.25	17.25	
22	A	Helena Engman	Sweden	17.19	x	x	17.19	
23	A	Jillian Camarena	United States	16.92	x	x	16.92	
24	B	Anita Márton	Hungary	15.99	16.80	16.76	16.80	
25	B	Leila Rajabi	Iran	16.12	16.60	x	16.60	
26	B	'Ana Po'uhila	Tonga	15.50	x	16.09	16.09	
27	A	Annie Alexander	Trinidad and Tobago	16.01	15.82	x	16.01	
28	A	Kristin Heaston	United States	x	x	14.98	14.98	

Key: PB = Personal best, Q = qualification by place in heat, q = qualification by overall place

=== Final ===
Rank	Athlete	Nationality	#1	#2	#3	#4	#5	#6	Result	Notes
1st place, gold medalist(s)	Valerie Vili	New Zealand	19.40	x	20.25	20.16	20.44	20.25	20.44	
2nd place, silver medalist(s)	Nadine Kleinert	Germany	20.06	19.52	20.20	19.61	x	x	20.20	PB
3rd place, bronze medalist(s)	Gong Lijiao	China	19.69	19.89	19.68	19.75	x	x	19.89	PB
4	Natallia Mikhnevich	Belarus	19.66	X	19.27	19.51	x	x	19.66	
5	Anna Avdeyeva	Russia	18.66	18.78	19.48	19.66	x	x	19.66	
6	Michelle Carter	United States	x	18.93	18.96	x	18.30	x	18.96	
7	Li Meiju	China	18.76	18.35	18.66	x	x	x	18.76	
8	Misleydis González	Cuba	18.73	18.57	x	18.60	18.74	18.43	18.74	
9	Mailín Vargas	Cuba	18.67	18.10	18.11				18.67	
10	Liu Xiangrong	China	18.52	x	16.79				18.52	
11	Denise Hinrichs	Germany	18.30	18.39	x				18.39	
12	Christina Schwanitz	Germany	17.84	x	x				17.84	

Key: PB = Personal best

== See also ==
- 2009 Shot Put Year Ranking
