= 2011 Asian Athletics Championships – Women's shot put =

The women's shot put at the 2011 Asian Athletics Championships was held at the Kobe Universiade Memorial Stadium on 10 July.

== Results ==
| Rank | Athlete | Nationality | #1 | #2 | #3 | #4 | #5 | #6 | Result | Notes |
|---|---|---|---|---|---|---|---|---|---|---|
| 1st place, gold medalist(s) | Meng Qianqian | China | 15.87 | 17.48 | x | 18.07 | 18.16 | 18.31 | 18.31 | PB |
| 2nd place, silver medalist(s) | Liu Xiangrong | China | 18.30 | x | x | x | 17.99 | 18.09 | 18.30 | |
| 3rd place, bronze medalist(s) | Leyla Rajabi | Iran | 15.93 | 16.32 | 16.48 | 16.42 | 16.60 | x | 16.60 | |
| 4 | Sofiya Burhanova | Uzbekistan | x | 15.99 | 15.84 | 16.33 | 16.32 | 15.31 | 16.33 | |
| 5 | Lin Chia-Ying | Chinese Taipei | 15.83 | x | x | 16.17 | x | x | 16.17 | |
| 6 | Yukino Otani | Japan | 14.63 | x | 14.88 | x | 14.66x | 14.51 | 14.88 | |
