= Misleydis González =

Cuban shot putter (born 1978)

Personal information
- Full name: Misleydis González Tamayo
- Born: 19 June 1978 (age 48) Bayamo, Granma, Cuba
- Height: 1.86 m (6 ft 1 in)
- Weight: 83 kg (183 lb)

Sport
- Country: Cuba
- Sport: Athletics
- Event: Shot Put
Medal record
Representing Cuba
Olympic Games
| Silver medal – second place | 2008 Beijing | Shot put |
World Indoor Championships
| Bronze medal – third place | 2008 Valencia | Shot put |
Pan American Games
| Gold medal – first place | 2007 Rio de Janeiro | Shot put |
| Gold medal – first place | 2011 Guadalajara | Shot put |
Central American and Caribbean Games
| Silver medal – second place | 2006 Cartagena | Shot put |
Summer Universiade
| Bronze medal – third place | 2005 İzmir | Shot put |
- Updated on 26 June 2013

Misleydis González Tamayo (Spanish pronunciation: [misˈlejðis ɣonˈsales]; born 19 June 1978) is a Cuban shot putter. Her personal best throw is 19.50 metres, achieved in August 2008 in the 2008 Summer Olympics in Beijing en route to winning the Olympic silver medal. She has represented Cuba at the Summer Olympics three times, coming seventh in 2004 and second in 2008, and five times at the World Championships in Athletics (2005 to 2011)

She is a two-time Pan American Games champion in the event (2007 and 2011) and a three-time champion at the Central American and Caribbean Championships. She was the bronze medallist at the 2005 Summer Universiade. González placed fourth in the shot put at the 2008 IAAF World Indoor Championships.

== Personal bests ==
Outdoor

- Shot put: 19.50 m – Beijing, China, 16 August 2008

Indoor

- Shot put: 18.86 m – Valencia, Spain, 28 February 2010

== International competition record ==
| Year | Competition | Venue | Position | Event | Notes |
Representing Cuba
| 1996 | Central American and Caribbean Junior Championships (U-20) | San Salvador, El Salvador | 1st | Shot put (4 kg) | 14.54 m |
| 1997 | Pan American Junior Championships | Havana, Cuba | 4th | Shot put (4 kg) | 14.47 m |
| 2001 | Central American and Caribbean Championships | Guatemala City, Guatemala | 1st | Shot put | 17.20 m |
| 2003 | Central American and Caribbean Championships | St. George's, Grenada | 1st | Shot put | 18.09 m |
| 2003 | Pan American Games | Santo Domingo, Dominican Republic | 4th | Shot put | 17.99 m |
| 2004 | World Indoor Championships | Budapest, Hungary | 6th | Shot put | 18.41 m |
| 2004 | Ibero-American Championships | Huelva, Spain | 2nd | Shot put | 18.65 m |
| 2004 | Olympic Games | Olympia, Greece | 6th | Shot put | 18.59 m |
| 2005 | World Championships | Helsinki, Finland | 10th | Shot put | 18.01 m |
| 2005 | Universiade | İzmir, Turkey | 3rd | Shot put | 18.26 m |
| 2006 | Central American and Caribbean Games | Cartagena, Colombia | 2nd | Shot put | 18.80 m |
| 2007 | Pan American Games | Rio de Janeiro, Brazil | 1st | Shot put | 18.83 m |
| 2007 | World Championships | Osaka, Japan | 11th | Shot put | 18.14 m |
| 2008 | World Indoor Championships | Valencia, Spain | 3rd | Shot put | 18.75 m |
| 2008 | Olympic Games | Beijing, China | 2nd | Shot put | 19.50 m |
| 2009 | ALBA Games | Havana, Cuba | 3rd | Shot put | 18.41 m |
| 2009 | Central American and Caribbean Championships | Havana, Cuba | 1st | Shot put | 19.13 m CR |
| 2009 | World Championships | Berlin, Germany | 8th | Shot put | 18.74 m |
| 2010 | World Indoor Championships | Doha, Qatar | 7th | Shot put | 18.77 m |
| 2010 | Ibero-American Championships | San Fernando, Spain | 1st | Shot put | 18.52 m |
| 2011 | World Championships | Daegu, South Korea | 16th (q) | Shot put | 18.24 m |
| 2011 | Pan American Games | Guadalajara, Mexico | 1st | Shot put | 18.57 m |
| 2012 | World Indoor Championships | Istanbul, Turkey | 11th (q) | Shot put | 17.32 m |
| 2012 | Ibero-American Championships | Barquisimeto, Venezuela | 3rd | Shot put | 18.03 m |
| 2012 | Olympic Games | London, United Kingdom | 20th (q) | Shot put | 17.68 m |
