= Cleopatra Borel =

Trinidad and Tobago shot putter

Personal information
- Born: 10 March 1979 (age 47) Plaisance, Mayaro, Trinidad and Tobago
- Height: 1.72 m (5 ft 7 1/2 in)
- Weight: 89 kg (196 lb)

Sport
- Country: Trinidad and Tobago
- Sport: Athletics
- Event: Shot Put

Achievements and titles
- Personal bests: 19.42 m (July 2011); 19.48 m
Medal record
Representing Trinidad and Tobago
Commonwealth Games
| Silver medal – second place | 2010 Delhi | Shot put |
| Silver medal – second place | 2014 Glasgow | Shot put |
| Bronze medal – third place | 2006 Melbourne | Shot put |
Pan American Games
| Gold medal – first place | 2015 Toronto | Shot put |
| Silver medal – second place | 2011 Guadalajara | Shot put |
| Bronze medal – third place | 2007 Rio de Janeiro | Shot put |
Central American and Caribbean Games
| Gold medal – first place | 2010 Mayagüez | Shot put |
| Bronze medal – third place | 2006 Cartagena | Shot put |
- Updated on 9 January 2015

Cleopatra Ayesha Borel (in 2005–2010 Borel-Brown; born 10 March 1979) is a Trinidad and Tobago shot putter. She is a 2014 Sportswoman of the Year Award recipient.

== Early life ==
Borel is a graduate of Mayaro Government Primary School and a former attendee of Mayaro Composite School and Saint Stephen's College, Princes Town, Trinidad and Tobago. In 2002 she graduated from the University of Maryland, Baltimore County with a bachelor's degree in health psychology and pre-physical therapy and later pursued a master's degree in Interdisciplinary Studies from Virginia Tech.

== Career ==
In 2018 Cleopatra Borel participated at the Launch Meeting Circuit of Central Coliseum - National Stadium in Chile, receiving her second gold medal for the year. In April of the same year, she participated at the 2018 Commonwealth Games at which she lost a bronze medal to Brittany Crew. Her personal best throw is 19.42 metres, achieved in July 2011 at the Paris Diamond League Meeting. She has a personal best of 19.48 metres on the indoor track, achieved in February 2004 in Blacksburg.

== Personal bests ==
| Event | Result | Venue | Date |
Outdoor
| Shot put | 19.42 m | Saint-Denis, France | 8 July 2011 |
| Hammer throw | 51.28 m | Baltimore, United States | 5 May 2001 |
Indoor
| Shot put | 19.48 m | Blacksburg, United States | 14 February 2004 |

== Achievements ==
| Year | Competition | Venue | Position | Notes |
Representing Trinidad and Tobago
| 2002 | Commonwealth Games | Manchester, United Kingdom | 4th | 16.27 m |
| 2002 | NACAC Under-25 Championships | San Antonio, United States | 2nd | 16.46 m |
| 2003 | Central American and Caribbean Championships | St. George's, Grenada | 2nd | 17.79 m |
| 2003 | Pan American Games | Santo Domingo, Dominican Republic | 6th | 17.23 m |
| 2004 | World Indoor Championships | Istanbul, Turkey | 11th (q) | 18.19 m |
| 2004 | Olympic Games | Athens, Greece | 10th | 18.35 m |
| 2004 | World Athletics Final | Monte Carlo, Monaco | 8th | 16.24 m |
| 2005 | Central American and Caribbean Championships | Nassau, Bahamas | 2nd | 18.05 m |
| 2005 | World Championships | Helsinki, Finland | 18th (q) | 17.31 m |
| 2006 | World Indoor Championships | Moscow, Russia | 8th | 17.59 m |
| 2006 | Commonwealth Games | Melbourne, Australia | 3rd | 17.87 m |
| 2006 | Central American and Caribbean Games | Cartagena, Colombia | 3rd | 18.33 m |
| 2007 | NACAC Championships | San Salvador, El Salvador | 1st | 17.53 m |
| 2007 | Pan American Games | Rio de Janeiro, Brazil | 3rd | 18.22 m |
| 2007 | World Championships | Osaka, Japan | 18th (q) | 17.29 m |
| 2007 | World Athletics Final | Stuttgart, Germany | 5th | 18.66 m |
| 2008 | World Indoor Championships | Valencia, Spain | 7th | 18.47 m |
| 2008 | Central American and Caribbean Championships | Cali, Colombia | 1st | 18.10 m |
| 2008 | Olympic Games | Beijing, China | 17th (q) | 17.96 m |
| 2008 | World Athletics Final | Stuttgart, Germany | 4th | 18.50 m |
| 2009 | Central American and Caribbean Championships | Havana, Cuba | 3rd | 17.98 m |
| 2009 | World Championships | Berlin, Germany | 13th (q) | 17.99 m |
| 2010 | World Indoor Championships | Doha, Qatar | 11th (q) | 18.31 m |
| 2010 | Central American and Caribbean Games | Mayagüez, Puerto Rico | 1st | 18.76 m |
| 2011 | Central American and Caribbean Championships | Mayagüez, Puerto Rico | 1st | 19.00 m |
| 2011 | World Championships | Daegu, South Korea | 13th | 17.62 m |
| 2011 | Pan American Games | Guadalajara, Mexico | 2nd | 18.46 m |
| 2012 | Olympic Games | London, United Kingdom | 12th (q) | 18.36 m |
| 2013 | Central American and Caribbean Championships | Morelia, Mexico | 1st | 17.56 m |
| 2013 | World Championships | Moscow, Russia | 14th (q) | 17.84 m |
| 2014 | Commonwealth Games | Glasgow, United Kingdom | 2nd | 18.57 m |
| 2014 | Continental Cup | Marrakesh, Morocco | 5th | 18.68 m |
| 2014 | Central American and Caribbean Games | Xalapa, Mexico | 1st | 18.99 m A |
| 2015 | Pan American Games | Toronto, Canada | 1st | 18.67 m |
| 2015 | World Championships | Beijing, China | 12th | 17.43 m |
| 2016 | World Indoor Championships | Portland, United States | 4th | 18.38 m |
| 2016 | Olympic Games | Rio de Janeiro, Brazil | 7th | 18.37 m |
| 2018 | World Indoor Championships | Birmingham, United Kingdom | 9th | 17.80 m |
| 2018 | Commonwealth Games | Gold Coast, Australia | 4th | 18.05 m |
| 2018 | Central American and Caribbean Games | Barranquilla, Colombia | 1st | 18.14 m |
| 2018 | NACAC Championships | Toronto, Canada | 2nd | 17.83 m |
| 2019 | Pan American Games | Lima, Peru | 8th | 17.37 m |

== Personal life ==
In 2005, Borel married her college sweetheart Balvin Brown. The couple currently lives in Blacksburg, Virginia.

Cleopatra Borel returned to Trinidad in 2012 after the London Olympic Games, where she trained for the 2016 Games in Rio de Janeiro.
