= 2010 European Athletics Championships – Women's shot put =

Women's shot put at the European Athletics Championships

The women's shot put at the 2010 European Athletics Championships was held at the Estadi Olímpic Lluís Companys on 27 July.

== Medalists ==
Gold	Anna Avdeyeva; Russia
Silver	Yanina Pravalinskay-Karolchyk; Belarus
Bronze	Olga Ivanova; Russia

== Records ==
Standing records prior to the 2010 European Athletics Championships
World record	Natalya Lisovskaya (URS)	22.63	Moscow, Soviet Union	7 June 1987
European record	Natalya Lisovskaya (URS)	22.63	Moscow, Soviet Union	7 June 1987
Championship record	Vita Pavlysh (UKR)	21.69	Budapest, Hungary	20 August 1998
World Leading	Nadzeya Ostapchuk (BLR)	20.95	Hrodna, Belarus	26 June 2010
European Leading	Nadzeya Ostapchuk (BLR)	20.95	Hrodna, Belarus	26 June 2010

== Schedule ==
Date	Time	Round
27 July 2010	10:30	Qualification
27 July 2010	19:35	Final

== Results ==
=== Qualification ===
Qualification: Qualification Performance 17.50 (Q) or at least 12 best performers advance to the final

Rank	Group	Athlete	Nationality	#1	#2	#3	Result	Notes
1	B	Nadine Kleinert	Germany	18.98			18.98	Q
2	B	Petra Lammert	Germany	18.48			18.48	Q
DQ	A	Natallia Mikhnevich	Belarus	~~18.46~~			~~18.46~~	Q, Doping
DQ	B	Nadzeya Ostapchuk	Belarus	~~18.44~~			~~18.44~~	Q, Doping
3	A	Chiara Rosa	Italy	16.35	18.26		18.26	Q
4	B	Olga Ivanova	Russia	17.93			17.93	Q
5	B	Melissa Boekelman	Netherlands	17.13	x	17.89	17.89	Q
6	A	Anita Márton	Hungary	17.84			17.84	Q
7	B	Mariam Kevkhishvili	Georgia	16.62	17.36	17.78	17.78	Q
8	A	Denise Hinrichs	Germany	17.72			17.72	Q
9	A	Yanina Pravalinskay-Karolchyk	Belarus	17.68			17.68	Q
10	A	Anna Avdeyeva	Russia	17.66			17.66	Q
11	A	Austra Skujytė	Lithuania	17.30	17.62		17.62	Q,
12	B	Helena Engman	Sweden	17.32	17.55		17.55	Q
13	B	Úrsula Ruiz	Spain	15.86	16.79	16.04	16.79	
14	A	Maria Antónia Borges	Portugal	15.42	x	16.08	16.08	
15	A	Irache Quintanal	Spain	x	16.01	x	16.01	
16	A	Radoslava Mavrodieva	Bulgaria	x	15.58	x	15.58	
17	B	Jana Kárníková	Czech Republic	x	15.54	15.56	15.56	

=== Final ===
Rank	Athlete	Nationality	#1	#2	#3	#4	#5	#6	Result	Notes
DQ	Nadzeya Ostapchuk	Belarus	~~19.67~~	~~x~~	~~x~~	~~20.43~~	~~x~~	~~20.48~~	~~20.48~~	Doping
DQ	Natallia Mikhnevich	Belarus	~~17.71~~	~~19.52~~	~~19.27~~	~~x~~	~~19.09~~	~~19.53~~	~~19.53~~	Doping
1st place, gold medalist(s)	Anna Avdeyeva	Russia	18.25	x	19.25	18.53	18.57	19.39	19.39	Season Best
2nd place, silver medalist(s)	Yanina Pravalinskay-Karolchyk	Belarus	x	18.69	19.29	x	19.19	19.29	19.29	
3rd place, bronze medalist(s)	Olga Ivanova	Russia	18.04	18.97	18.46	18.74	x	19.02	19.02	
4	Petra Lammert	Germany	18.84	x	18.73	18.68	18.94	18.92	18.94	
5	Nadine Kleinert	Germany	18.94	18.61	18.59	18.71	x	x	18.94	
6	Denise Hinrichs	Germany	18.13	x	18.42	18.48	18.19	x	18.48	
7	Helena Engman	Sweden	17.60	17.07	18.11				18.11	
8	Mariam Kevkhishvili	Georgia	17.71	x	17.87				17.87	
9	Anita Márton	Hungary	17.28	17.53	17.78				17.78	
10	Austra Skujytė	Lithuania	17.72	16.96	17.54				17.72	Season Best
13	Chiara Rosa	Italy	17.29	17.49	x				17.49	
14	Melissa Boekelman	Netherlands	17.11	x	17.32				17.32	
