= Helena Engman =

Swedish shot putter

Personal information
- Born: 16 June 1976 (age 50) Piteå, Sweden

Sport
- Sport: Track and field

Helena Sofia Engman (born 16 June 1976) is a Swedish shot putter.

She finished sixth at the 2003 Summer Universiade and eighth at the 2007 European Indoor Championships. She also competed at the 2006 European Championships and the 2007 World Championships without reaching the finals. She achieved a personal best throw of 17.72 metres in June 2007 in Turin – a Swedish record.

She improved her national record to 18.17 m in August 2010, bringing her fourth place at the Folksam Grand Prix.

== Achievements ==
Year	Competition	Venue	Position	Event	Notes
Representing Sweden
1997	Universiade	Catania, Italy	13th (q)	Shot put	13.99 m
1997	Universiade	Catania, Italy	18th (q)	Discus throw	42.12 m
1997	Universiade	Catania, Italy	21st (q)	Hammer throw	44.10 m
1999	Universiade	Palma de Mallorca, Spain	11th	Shot put	14.95 m
1999	Universiade	Palma de Mallorca, Spain	20th (q)	Discus throw	46.60 m
1999	Universiade	Palma de Mallorca, Spain	27th (q)	Hammer throw	48.10 m
2003	Universiade	Daegu, South Korea	6th	Shot put	15.99 m
2006	European Championships	Gothenburg, Sweden	17th (q)	Shot put	15.60 m
2007	European Indoor Championships	Birmingham, United Kingdom	8th	Shot put	16.09 m
2007	World Championships	Osaka, Japan	16th (q)	Shot put	17.50 m
2008	World Indoor Championships	Valencia, Spain	15th (q)	Shot put	16.79 m
2009	European Indoor Championships	Turin, Italy	12th (q)	Shot put	16.38 m
2009	World Championships	Berlin, Germany	22nd (q)	Shot put	17.19 m
2010	European Championships	Barcelona, Spain	9th	Shot put	18.11 m
2012	European Championships	Helsinki, Finland	8th	Shot put	17.64 m
2013	European Indoor Championships	Gothenburg, Sweden	9th (q)	Shot put	17.34 m
