= Úrsula Ruiz =

Spanish shot putter

Personal information
- Born: 11 August 1983 (age 42) Lorca, Spain
- Height: 1.70 m (5 ft 7 in)
- Weight: 82 kg (181 lb)

Sport
- Country: Spain
- Sport: Athletics
- Event: Shot Put
- Updated on 8 January 2013

Úrsula Ruiz Pérez (born 11 August 1983) is a Spanish athlete. She competed for Spain in shot put at the 2012 Summer Olympics, finishing 9th in the qualifying heat with a throw of 17.99 m (59.0 ft) and setting a new personal best.

== Competition record ==
Year	Competition	Venue	Position	Event	Notes
Representing Spain
2002	World Junior Championships	Kingston, Jamaica	10th	Shot put	14.96 m
2003	European U23 Championships	Bydgoszcz, Poland	10th	Shot put	15.44 m
2005	European U23 Championships	Erfurt, Germany	12th	Shot put	14.89 m
2009	Universiade	Belgrade, Serbia	6th	Shot put	16.07 m
2010	Ibero-American Championships	San Fernando, Spain	3rd	Shot put	16.97 m
2010	European Championships	Barcelona, Spain	15th (q)	Shot put	16.79 m
2011	Universiade	Shenzhen, China	6th	Shot put	17.02 m
2012	World Indoor Championships	Istanbul, Turkey	15th (q)	Shot put	16.43 m
2012	European Championships	Helsinki, Finland	13th (q)	Shot put	16.39 m
2012	Olympic Games	London, United Kingdom	16th (q)	Shot put	17.99 m
2013	European Indoor Championships	Gothenburg, Sweden	8th	Shot put	17.22 m
2013	World Championships	Moscow, Russia	23rd (q)	Shot put	17.14 m
2014	World Indoor Championships	Sopot, Poland	14th (q)	Shot put	17.16 m
2014	European Championships	Zurich, Switzerland	14th (q)	Shot put	15.79 m
2015	European Indoor Championships	Prague, Czech Republic	8th	Shot put	16.07 m
2015	World Championships	Beijing, China	23rd (q)	Shot put	16.36 m
2016	European Championships	Amsterdam, Netherlands	10th	Shot put	17.14 m
2017	European Indoor Championships	Belgrade, Serbia	17th (q)	Shot put	16.15 m
2017	World Championships	London, United Kingdom	28rd (q)	Shot put	16.20 m
2018	European Championships	Berlin, Germany	13th (q)	Shot put	17.06 m
2019	European Indoor Championships	Glasgow, United Kingdom	17th (q)	Shot put	16.41 m
