= List of European Athletics Indoor Championships medalists =

The following are lists of European Athletics Indoor Championships medalists:

- List of European Athletics Indoor Championships medalists (men)
- List of European Athletics Indoor Championships medalists (women)
