= Michelle Carter (athlete) =

American shot putter (born 1985)

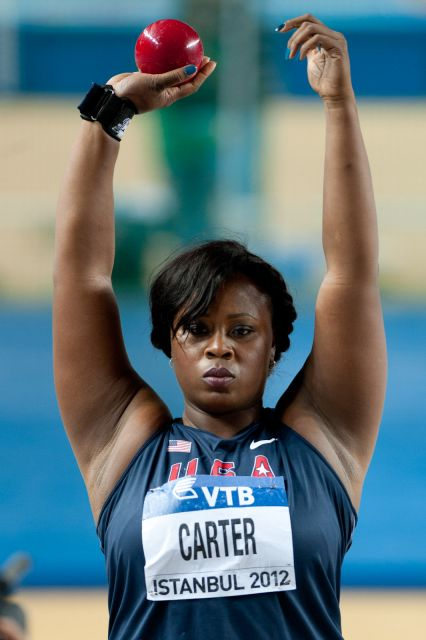
- Carter at the 2012 World Indoor Championships in Istanbul

Personal information
- Full name: Michelle Denee Carter
- Nationality: American
- Born: October 12, 1985 (age 41) San Jose, California, U.S.
- Home town: Red Oak, Texas, U.S.

Sport
- Country: United States
- Sport: Athletics (track and field)
- Event: Shot put
- College team: Texas Longhorns
- Turned pro: 2007
- Coached by: Michael Carter
- Retired: 2022

Achievements and titles
- Personal bests: Shot put: 20.63 m (67 ft 8 in) (2016); Discus: 54.06 m (177 ft 4 1/4 in) (2007)
Medal record
Olympic Games
Gold medal – first place	2016 Rio de Janeiro	Shot put
World Championships
Bronze medal – third place	2015 Beijing	Shot put
Bronze medal – third place	2017 London	Shot put
World Indoor Championships
Silver medal – second place	2012 Istanbul	Shot put
Gold medal – first place	2016 Portland	Shot put
Diamond League
First place	2016 Brussels	Shot put
Pan American Games
Bronze medal – third place	2011 Guadalajara	Shot put
NACAC U23 Championships
Silver medal – second place	2006 Santo Domingo	Shot put
World Junior Championships
Gold medal – first place	2004 Grosseto	Shot put
Pan American Junior Championships
Gold medal – first place	2003 Bridgetown	Shot put
World Youth Championships
Silver medal – second place	2001 Debrecen	Shot put

Michelle Denee Carter (born October 12, 1985) is an American retired track and field athlete who competed in shot put. She won a gold medal in the event at the 2016 Rio Olympics, making her the first American woman to win Olympic gold in shot put and only the second to medal in the event. Carter is the former American record holder in the event with a distance of 20.63 m (67 ft 8 in) set at the 2016 Olympic Games. She was inducted into the Texas Sports Hall of Fame in 2020.

== Early life ==
Carter was born on October 12, 1985, in San Jose, California, and grew up in Red Oak, Texas. Her parents are Sandra and Michael Carter, the latter of whom won a silver medal in shot put at the 1984 Summer Olympics in Los Angeles and went on to play American football for the San Francisco 49ers. She has one brother, Michael Jr., and one sister, D’Andra.

Carter is a 2003 graduate of Red Oak High School in Red Oak, Texas, where she was a four-time state champion in shot put and held the girls’ national record in the event from 2003 to 2014. She earned an athletic scholarship to University of Texas, where she competed in shot put, and graduated with a bachelor's degree in youth and community studies, with a minor in kinesiology, in 2007.

== Career ==
Carter won the 2016 gold medal at the Rio Olympics on the last of her six throws, edging two-time defending champion Valerie Adams of New Zealand. In doing so, Carter became the first United States women's athlete to win the event since the women's competition began at the 1948 Summer Olympic Games in London, and only the second American to win any medal in the event (Earlene Brown, bronze, 1960). Carter broke her own American record with an Olympic gold medal-winning toss of 20.63 m (67 ft 8 in).

She finished fifteenth at the 2008 Olympic Games and fourth at the 2012 Olympic Games.

A bronze medalist at the 2015 and 2017 IAAF World Championships, Carter also won the gold medal at the 2016 World Indoor Championships after winning the bronze in 2012.

She won the silver medal at the 2001 World Youth Championships and the gold medal at the 2004 World Junior Championships.

In addition to winning the 2008 United States Olympic Team Trials, she was the 2009, 2011, 2013, 2014, 2015 and 2016 national champion. While competing for the University of Texas, she won the NCAA collegiate national championship in 2006. In college, she was a seven-time All-American, and also won the Big 12 Conference title five times. In 2006, she won the NCAA indoor title to also help the University of Texas women claim the NCAA team title. With a runner-up finish in the shot put at the 2005 outdoor meet, Carter helped the Longhorns win the NCAA championship.

In June 2022, Carter announced her retirement from competition.

== Awards and recognitions ==
Carter was inducted into the Texas Longhorns Hall of Honor in 2016, the Texas Track and Field Hall of Fame in 2018, and the Texas Sports Hall of Fame in 2020.

== Personal life ==
Carter is a Christian. She has said, "Through faith and sports, I've learned discipline and self-control. In the Bible, God tells us we have to work, even if what we want is not going to happen right away. People want a platform, but with that comes responsibility. Before winning the gold medal, I needed to be in a mature place to handle the opportunities that were going to come my way, to make sure I didn't use them for my advantage. You have to put your pride aside and let God's plan come through. He has given me this platform for Him to shine." She has also said "I know God allowed me to have this medal, and with it I want to glorify Him and point others to Him."

As a child, Carter was diagnosed with ADHD and dyslexia.

Carter is a certified professional make-up artist.

Carter has focused on body image both on and off the field, talking to young women about confidence through her program You Throw Girl. "You have to understand everyone's body was built to do something. I was built to do something, and that's how I was built. I think the world is realizing we were promoting one body type and there have always been many."

Carter married husband Courtney Elder in 2019. They first met as children at Oak Cliff Bible Fellowship church, when Carter was 5 years old, and reconnected as adults in 2016.

Carter lives in Grand Prairie, Texas. She was inducted as an honorary member of Sigma Gamma Rho on July 24, 2026, during the sorority's 61st Biennial Boule in Tampa, Florida.

== Competition history ==
=== International competitions ===
Representing the United States
Year	Competition	Venue	Position	Event	Result	Notes
2001	World Youth Championships	Debrecen, Hungary	2nd	Shot put	15.23 m (49 ft 11 1/2 in)	SB
2003	Pan American Junior Championships	Bridgetown, Barbados	1st	Shot put	16.23 m (53 ft 2 3/4 in)	—N/a
2004	World Junior Championships	Grosseto, Italy	1st	Shot put	17.55 m (57 ft 6 3/4 in)	SB
2006	NACAC U23 Championships	Santo Domingo, Dominican Republic	2nd	Shot put	16.74 m (54 ft 11 in)	—N/a
2008	Olympic Games	Beijing, China	13th	Shot put	17.74 m (58 ft 2 1/4 in)	—N/a
2009	World Championships	Berlin, Germany	5th	Shot put	18.96 m (62 ft 2 1/4 in)	—N/a
2010	World Indoor Championships	Doha, Qatar	10th	Shot put	18.20 m (59 ft 8 1/2 in)	—N/a
2011	World Championships	Daegu, South Korea	8th	Shot put	18.76 m (61 ft 6 1/2 in)	—N/a
2011	Pan American Games	Guadalajara, Mexico	3rd	Shot put	18.09 m (59 ft 4 in)	—N/a
2012	World Indoor Championships	Istanbul, Turkey	2nd	Shot put	19.58 m (64 ft 2 3/4 in)	—N/a
2012	Olympic Games	London, United Kingdom	4th	Shot put	19.42 m (63 ft 8 1/2 in)	—N/a
2013	World Championships	Moscow, Russia	4th	Shot put	19.94 m (65 ft 5 in)	—N/a
2014	World Indoor Championships	Sopot, Poland	4th	Shot put	19.10 m (62 ft 7 3/4 in)	—N/a
2015	World Championships	Beijing, China	3rd	Shot put	19.76 m (64 ft 9 3/4 in)	—N/a
2016	World Indoor Championships	Portland, Oregon	1st	Shot put	20.21 m (66 ft 3 1/2 in)	—N/a
2016	Olympic Games	Rio de Janeiro, Brazil	1st	Shot put	20.63 m (67 ft 8 in)	PB
2017	World Championships	London, United Kingdom	3rd	Shot put	19.14 m (62 ft 9 1/2 in)	—N/a
2019	World Championships	Doha, Qatar	9th	Shot put	18.41 m (60 ft 4 3/4 in)	—N/a

=== Circuit wins and titles ===
- Diamond League
  - Memorial Van Damme (Final): 2016
  - Doha Diamond League: 2017
  - London Anniversary Games: 2015

=== National competitions ===
Year	Competition	Venue	Position	Event	Result	Notes
2000	USA Junior Olympics	Amherst, Massachusetts	1st	Shot put	14.44 m (47 ft 4 1/2 in)	SB
2001	USA Junior Olympics	Sacramento, California	1st	Shot put	15.19 m (49 ft 10 in)	—N/a
2002	USA Junior Championships	Palo Alto, California	3rd	Shot put	16.24 m (53 ft 3 1/4 in)	—N/a
2002	USA Junior Olympics	Miami, Florida	1st	Shot put	15.59 m (51 ft 1 3/4 in)	—N/a
2003	USA Junior Championships	Palo Alto, California	1st	Shot put	16.05 m (52 ft 7 3/4 in)	—N/a
2003	USA Junior Olympics	Miami, Florida	1st	Shot put	15.82 m (51 ft 10 3/4 in)	—N/a
2004	USA Junior Championships	College Station, Texas	1st	Shot put	16.33 m (53 ft 6 3/4 in)	—N/a
2005	USA Championships	Carson, California	2nd	Shot put	18.26 m (59 ft 10 3/4 in)	SB
2006	USA Championships	Indianapolis, Indiana	5th	Shot put	17.45 m (57 ft 3 in)	—N/a
2007	USA Championships	Indianapolis, Indiana	5th	Shot put	17.57 m (57 ft 7 1/2 in)	—N/a
2008	United States Olympic Trials	Eugene, Oregon	1st	Shot put	18.85 m (61 ft 10 in)	SB
2009	USA Championships	Eugene, Oregon	1st	Shot put	18.03 m (59 ft 1 3/4 in)	—N/a
2010	USA Indoor Championships	Albuquerque, New Mexico	2nd	Shot put	18.03 m (59 ft 1 3/4 in)	—N/a
2010	USA Championships	Des Moines, Iowa	2nd	Shot put	18.46 m (60 ft 6 3/4 in)	—N/a
2011	USA Championships	Eugene, Oregon	1st	Shot put	19.86 m (65 ft 1 3/4 in)	SB
2012	USA Indoor Championships	Albuquerque, New Mexico	2nd	Shot put	19.27 m (63 ft 2 1/2 in)	—N/a
2012	USA Championships	Eugene, Oregon	2nd	Shot put	18.57 m (60 ft 11 in)	—N/a
2013	USA Indoor Championships	Albuquerque, New Mexico	1st	Shot put	19.41 m (63 ft 8 in)	—N/a
2013	USA Championships	Des Moines, Iowa	1st	Shot put	20.24 m (66 ft 4 3/4 in)	SB
2014	USA Indoor Championships	Albuquerque, New Mexico	1st	Shot put	18.45 m (60 ft 6 1/4 in)	—N/a
2014	USA Championships	Sacramento, California	1st	Shot put	19.45 m (63 ft 9 1/2 in)	—N/a
2015	USA Indoor Championships	Boston, Massachusetts	1st	Shot put	19.45 m (63 ft 9 1/2 in)	—N/a
2015	USA Championships	Eugene, Oregon	1st	Shot put	20.02 m (65 ft 8 in)	SB
2016	USA Indoor Championships	Portland, Oregon	1st	Shot put	19.49 m (63 ft 11 1/4 in)	—N/a
2016	United States Olympic Trials	Eugene, Oregon	1st	Shot put	19.59 m (64 ft 3 1/4 in)	—N/a
2017	USA Indoor Championships	Albuquerque, New Mexico	1st	Shot put	19.03 m (62 ft 5 in)	—N/a
2017	USA Championships	Sacramento, California	3rd	Shot put	19.34 m (63 ft 5 1/4 in)	—N/a
2018	USA Championships	Des Moines, Iowa	6th	Shot put	18.01 m (59 ft 1 in)	—N/a
2019	USA Championships	Des Moines, Iowa	2nd	Shot put	18.69 m (61 ft 3 3/4 in)	—N/a
2020	USA Indoor Championships	Albuquerque, New Mexico	7th	Shot put	17.63 m (57 ft 10 in)	—N/a
2022	USA Championships	Eugene, Oregon	8th	Shot put	17.72 m (58 ft 1 1/2 in)	SB
