= Jillian Camarena-Williams =

American shot putter

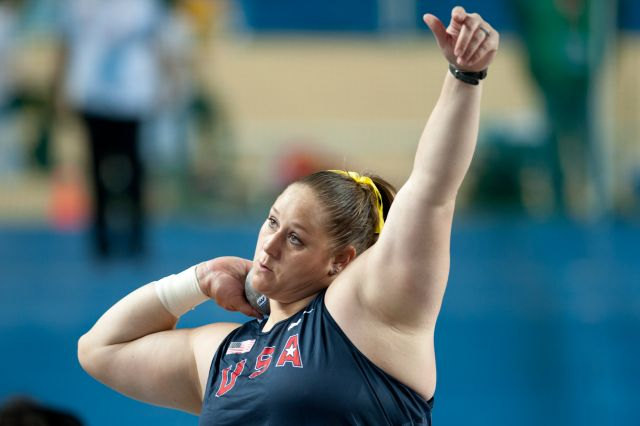
- Camarena-Williams at the 2012 World Indoor Championships in Istanbul

Personal information
- Full name: Jillian Mary Camarena-Williams
- Nickname: Jill
- Born: March 2, 1982 (age 44) Woodland, California, U.S.
- Height: 5 ft 10 in (1.78 m)
- Weight: 249 lb (113 kg)

Sport
- Country: United States
- Sport: Athletics
- Event: Shot Put
Medal record
Women's athletics
Representing the United States
World Championships
Silver medal – second place	2011 Daegu	Shot put
World Indoor Championships
Bronze medal – third place	2012 Istanbul	Shot put
Pan American Games
Silver medal – second place	2015 Toronto	Shot Put
NACAC Championships
Gold medal – first place	2015 Costa Rica	Shot Put
- Updated on August 6, 2012

Jillian Mary "Jill" Camarena-Williams, née Camarena, (March 2, 1982) is an American retired track and field athlete, who has competed in the shot put. She represented the United States at the 2012 and 2008 Beijing Olympics and both indoor and outdoors at World Championship-level.

She took back-to-back titles in the shot put at the Pan American Junior Championships in 1999 and 2001. Domestically, she is a two-time USA Outdoor Champion in the shot put, having won in 2006 and 2010. Camarena-Williams set an American indoor record in the shot put to win at the 2011 USA Indoor Track and Field Championships, recording a mark of 19.87 meters to improve upon Ramona Pagel's record which had stood since 1987.

Born in Woodland, California, she is listed at 5 foot 10 inches tall and 250 lbs. She did her undergraduate work at Stanford University and graduate studies at Brigham Young University. She is a Latter-day Saint. Camarena-Williams married her physiotherapist, Dustin Williams, in 2010. On July 29, 2016 - Camarena-Williams announced the four city team challenge at Track Town, USA in Eugene, Oregon on ESPN was her final competition.

== Doping ban ==
In October 2013, Camarena-Williams was hit with a six-month suspension from the US Anti-Doping Agency after testing positive for clomiphene. The substance was discovered in an out-of-competition test conducted on July 1. The punishment was implemented retrospectively, meaning she was cleared to compete again on January 1, 2014.

== Achievements ==
Year	Competition	Venue	Position	Notes
1999	Pan American Junior Championships	Tampa, United States	1st	Shot put
2001	Pan American Junior Championships	Santa Fe, Argentina	1st	Shot put
2006	World Indoor Championships	Moscow, Russia	7th	Shot put
2006	World Cup	Athens, Greece	6th	Shot put
2007	World Championships	Osaka, Japan	10th (qualifiers)	Shot put
2008	World Indoor Championships	Valencia, Spain	14th (qualifiers)	Shot put
2008	Olympic Games	Beijing, China	12th	Shot put
2009	World Championships	Berlin, Germany	12th (qualifiers)	Shot put
2010	World Indoor Championships	Doha, Qatar	6th	Shot put
2010	DécaNation	Annecy, France	1st	Shot put
2011	World Championships	Daegu, South Korea	2nd	Shot put
2011	DécaNation	Nice, France	1st	Shot put
2012	World Indoor Championships	Istanbul, Turkey	3rd	Shot put
2012	Olympic Games	London, United Kingdom	16th (qualifiers)	Shot put
2015	Pan American Games	Toronto, Ontario, Canada	2nd	Shot put
2015	NACAC Championships	San Jose, Costa Rica	1st	Shot put
