= Filiz Kadoğan =

Turkish shot putter

Personal information
- Full name: Filiz Kadoğan
- Nationality: Turkey
- Born: 12 February 1982 (age 44) Istanbul, Turkey
- Height: 1.88 m (6 ft 2 in)
- Weight: 97 kg (214 lb)

Sport
- Sport: Athletics
- Event: Shot put
- Club: Fenerbahçe S.K.
- Coached by: Sevinç Esmer

Achievements and titles
- Personal best: Shot put: 17.36 (2004)
Medal record
Women's athletics
Representing Turkey
European U23 Championships
Bronze medal – third place	2003 Bydgoszcz	Shot put

Filiz Kadoğan (born 12 February 1982 in Istanbul) is a retired Turkish shot putter. She earned a bronze medal in the women's shot put at the 2003 European U23 Championships in Bydgoszcz, Poland, and later represented her nation Turkey on her senior stint at the 2004 Summer Olympics. Throughout her athletics career, Kadogan trained full-time for Fenerbahçe Sports Club (Turkish: Fenerbahçe Spor Kulübü) in her native Istanbul under her coach and longtime mentor Sevinç Esmer. Kadogan has a personal outdoor best of 17.36 metres, set in 2009.

Kadogan initially highlighted her sporting debut at the 2003 European U23 Championships in Bydgoszcz, Poland, where she unleashed the ball at a third-place distance of 16.72 to round out the podium, finishing behind the gold medalist Natallia Kharaneka of Belarus by nearly a full meter.

At the 2004 Summer Olympics in Athens, Kadogan qualified for the Turkish squad on her senior stint in the women's shot put. A year earlier, she attained her season best and an Olympic B-standard entry mark of 17.16 metres from the European Cup League Series in Sofia, Bulgaria. During the prelims, Kadogan launched a 15.20-metre shot into the field on her opening attempt to obtain a thirty-fourth spot from a roster of thirty-eight athletes in the overall standings, failing to advance further to the final round.
