= Athletics at the 2008 Summer Olympics – Women's shot put =

Women's shot put at the Games of the XXIX Olympiad
- Venue: Beijing National Stadium
- Date: 16 August 2008
- Competitors: 35 from 22 nations
- Winning distance: 20.56

Medalists
1st place, gold medalist(s)		Valerie Vili	New Zealand
2nd place, silver medalist(s)		Misleydis González	Cuba
3rd place, bronze medalist(s)		Gong Lijiao	China

The women's shot put event at the 2008 Olympic Games took place on 16 August at the Beijing Olympic Stadium. The qualifying standards were 18.35 m (60 ft 2 in) (A standard) and 17.20 m (56 ft 5 in) (B standard).

The event was won by Valerie Vili (née Adams) of New Zealand, with a best throw of 20.56 metres.

In 2016 it was announced that a reanalysis of samples resulted in doping violations by Natallia Mikhnevich and Nadzeya Ostapchuk. They were disqualified from the competition and the silver and bronze medals were reallocated by the IAAF (now World Athletics).

== Schedule ==
All times are China standard time (UTC+8)

Date	Time	Round
Saturday, 16 August 2008	09:10; 21:10	Qualifications; Finals

== Records ==
Prior to this competition, the existing world and Olympic records were as follows.

World record	Natalya Lisovskaya (URS)	22.63 m	Moscow, Soviet Union	7 June 1987
Olympic record	Ilona Slupianek (GDR)	22.41 m	Moscow, Soviet Union	24 July 1980

No new world or Olympic records were set for this event.

== Results ==
=== Qualifying round ===
Qualification: Qualifying Performance 18.40 (Q) or at least 12 best performers (q) advance to the Final.

Rank	Group	Name	Nationality	1	2	3	Result	Notes
1	A	Valerie Vili	New Zealand	19.73			19.73	Q
2	B	Gong Lijiao	China	19.46			19.46	Q, PB
3	A	Li Meiju	China	19.18			19.18	Q, PB
DSQ	A	Natallia Mikhnevich	Belarus	19.11			19.11	Q
5	A	Christina Schwanitz	Germany	x	17.97	19.09	19.09	Q
DSQ	B	Nadzeya Ostapchuk	Belarus	19.08			19.08	Q
7	A	Misleydis González	Cuba	18.42	18.91		18.91	Q
8	B	Anna Omarova	Russia	18.26	x	18.74	18.74	Q
9	A	Chiara Rosa	Italy	18.74			18.74	Q, SB
10	B	Li Ling	China	18.60			18.60	Q
11	B	Nadine Kleinert	Germany	18.52			18.52	Q
12	A	Jillian Camarena	United States	18.15	18.32	18.51	18.51	Q, SB
13	B	Michelle Carter	United States	18.49			18.49	Q
14	A	Mailín Vargas	Cuba	18.47			18.47	Q
15	A	Olga Ivanova	Russia	17.69	18.27	18.46	18.46	Q
16	A	Denise Hinrichs	Germany	18.36	18.27	x	18.36	
17	B	Cleopatra Borel-Brown	Trinidad and Tobago	17.96	17.32	17.57	17.96	
18	A	Yanina Karolchyk-Pravalinskaya	Belarus	17.44	17.77	17.79	17.79	
19	B	Assunta Legnante	Italy	16.93	17.76	x	17.76	
20	B	Yumileidi Cumbá	Cuba	x	17.60	x	17.60	
21	A	Anca Heltne	Romania	17.48	x	17.40	17.48	
22	A	Natalia Duco	Chile	17.24	x	17.40	17.40	
23	A	Kristin Heaston	United States	x	17.34	17.34	17.34	
24	B	Vivian Chukwuemeka	Nigeria	17.15	17.05	x	17.15	
25	B	Irina Khudoroshkina	Russia	16.46	16.84	16.78	16.84	
26	A	Irini Terzoglou	Greece	16.08	16.14	16.50	16.50	
27	B	Ana Po'uhila	Tonga	16.21	16.42	16.35	16.42	
28	B	Lin Chia-Ying	Chinese Taipei	16.24	x	16.32	16.32	
29	B	Zhang Guirong	Singapore	x	16.23	16.08	16.23	
30	B	Mariam Kevkhishvili	Georgia	x	15.99	x	15.99	
31	B	Zara Northover	Jamaica	15.73	15.85	15.64	15.85	
32	A	Iolanta Ulyeva	Kazakhstan	15.49	x	15.06	15.49	
33	A	Lee Mi-Young	South Korea	14.76	x	15.10	15.10	
	A	Irache Quintanal	Spain	x	x	x	NM	
	B	Krystyna Zabawska	Poland	x	x	x	NM	

AR area record | CR championship record | GR games record | NR national record | OR Olympic record | PB personal best | SB season best | WL world leading (in a given season)
DNS = did not start | DQ = disqualification | NM = no mark (i.e. no valid result) | Q = qualification by place in heat | q = qualification by overall place

=== Final ===
Rank	Name	Nationality	1	2	3	4	5	6	Result	Notes
1st place, gold medalist(s)	Valerie Vili	New Zealand	20.56	20.40	20.26	20.01	20.52	-	20.56	AR
DSQ	Natallia Mikhnevich	Belarus	19.16	20.28	19.87	19.82	19.94	20.10	20.28	
DSQ	Nadzeya Ostapchuk	Belarus	x	18.69	18.36	x	19.86	19.36	19.86	
2nd place, silver medalist(s)	Misleydis González	Cuba	19.30	x	19.01	19.23	19.50	x	19.50	PB
3rd place, bronze medalist(s)	Gong Lijiao	China	18.45	18.75	18.90	18.92	19.04	19.20	19.20	
4	Anna Omarova	Russia	19.08	18.21	x	x	x	18.76	19.08	
5	Nadine Kleinert	Germany	18.30	18.68	19.01	18.99	x	18.81	19.01	
6	Li Meiju	China	18.68	18.99	18.74	x	18.85	19.00	19.00	
7	Olga Ivanova	Russia	17.96	x	18.44				18.44	
8	Mailín Vargas	Cuba	18.28	17.88	17.74				18.28	
9	Christina Schwanitz	Germany	x	17.96	18.27				18.27	
10	Jillian Camarena	United States	18.09	18.24	17.44				18.24	
11	Chiara Rosa	Italy	18.22	17.98	x				18.22	
12	Li Ling	China	17.94	x	17.81				17.94	
13	Michelle Carter	United States	16.97	17.65	17.74				17.74	

AR area record | CR championship record | GR games record | NR national record | OR Olympic record | PB personal best | SB season best | WL world leading (in a given season)
DNS = did not start | DQ = disqualification | NM = no mark (i.e. no valid result) | Q = qualification by place in heat | q = qualification by overall place
