= Chiara Rosa =

Italian shot putter (born 1983)

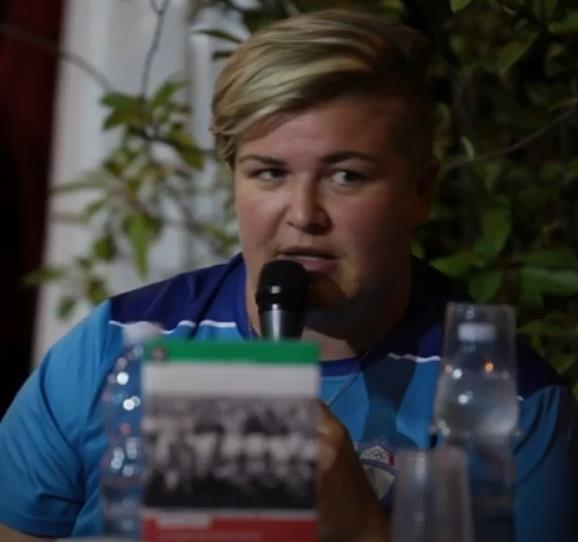
- Chiara Rosa in 2017

Personal information
- National team: Italy: 55 caps (2003-2021)
- Born: 28 January 1983 (age 43) Camposampiero, Italy
- Height: 1.76 m (5 ft 9 in)
- Weight: 90 kg (198 lb)

Sport
- Sport: Athletics
- Event: Shot put
- Club: G.S. Fiamme Azzurre

Achievements and titles
- Personal bests: Shot put: 19.15 m (2007); Shot put indoor: 18.68 m (2008)
Medal record
International Competitions (senior)
Event	1st	2nd	3rd
European Championships	0	0	1
European Indoor Championships	0	0	1
European Throwing Cup	0	0	5
European Team Championships	0	1	4
Universiade	0	1	0
Mediterranean Games	0	0	2
Total	0	2	13
European Championships
Bronze medal – third place	2012 Helsinki	Shot put
European Indoor Championships
Bronze medal – third place	2013 Gothenburg	Shot put
Universiade
Silver medal – second place	2009 Belgrade	Shot put
Mediterranean Games
Bronze medal – third place	2005 Almeira	Shot put
Bronze medal – third place	2009 Pescara	Shot put
European Team Championships
Silver medal – second place	2009 Leiria	Shot put
Bronze medal – third place	2008 Annecy	Shot put
Bronze medal – third place	2010 Bergen	Shot put
Bronze medal – third place	2011 Stockholm	Shot put
Bronze medal – third place	2014 Braunschweig	Shot put
European U23 Championships
Bronze medal – third place	2005 Erfurt	Shot put
World Youth Championships
Bronze medal – third place	1999 Bydgoszcz	Shot put

Chiara Rosa (born 28 January 1983) is an Italian shot putter who has won the individual national championship 29 times.

== Career ==
She was 2nd at Universiade, two times 3rd at Mediterranean Games and five times 3rd at European Cup Winter Throwing. She was also 3rd in Bergen 2010 at European Team Championships. Her personal best throw is 19.15 metres, achieved in June 2007 in Milan.

== Achievements ==
Year	Competition	Venue	Position	Notes
1999	World Youth Championships	Bydgoszcz, Poland	3rd	14.64 m
2000	World Junior Championships	Santiago, Chile	12th	14.61 m
2002	World Junior Championships	Kingston, Jamaica	4th	16.53 m
2003	European U23 Championships	Bydgoszcz, Poland	4th	16.49 m
2005	Mediterranean Games	Almería, Spain	3rd	17.34 m
2005	European U23 Championships	Erfurt, Germany	3rd	18.22 m
2005	Universiade	İzmir, Turkey	5th	17.10 m
2006	European Championships	Gothenburg, Sweden	8th	18.23 m
2007	European Cup Winter Throwing	Yalta, Ukraine	3rd	18.14 m
2007	World Championships	Osaka, Japan	8th	18.39 m
2007	World Athletics Final	Stuttgart, Germany	6th	17.82 m
2008	World Indoor Championships	Valencia, Spain	5th	18.68 m
2008	European Cup Winter Throwing	Split, Croatia	3rd	18.05 m
2008	European Team Championships	Annecy, France	3rd	18.03 m
2008	Olympic Games	Beijing, China	11th	18.22 m
2009	European Cup Winter Throwing	Tenerife, Spain	3rd	18.55 m
2009	Mediterranean Games	Pescara, Italy	3rd	17.34 m
2009	Universiade	Belgrade, Serbia	2nd	18.21 m
2009	European Team Championships	Leiria, Portugal	2nd	18.57 m
2009	World Championships	Berlin, Germany	16th (q)	17.89 m
2010	European Team Championships	Bergen, Norway	3rd	17.77 m
2010	European Championships	Barcelona, Spain	11th	17.49 m
2011	European Indoor Championships	Paris, France	7th	17.54 m
2011	European Cup Winter Throwing	Sofia, Bulgaria	3rd	17.39 m
2011	European Team Championships	Stockholm, Sweden	3rd	17.18 m
2011	World Championships	Daegu South Korea	14th (q)	18.28 m
2012	European Championships	Helsinki, Finland	3rd	18.47 m
2012	Olympic Games	London United Kingdom	14th (q)	18.30 m
2013	European Indoor Championships	Gothenburg, Sweden	3rd	18.37 m
2013	World Championships	Moscow, Russia	22nd (q)	17.18 m
2014	World Indoor Championships	Sopot, Poland	12th (q)	17.31 m
2014	European Team Championships	Braunschweig, Germany	3rd	17.92 3m
2014	European Championships	Zürich, Switzerland	5th	18.10 m
2015	European Indoor Championships	Prague, Czech Republic	9th (q)	16.75 m
2015	European Cup Winter Throwing	Leiria, Portugal	3rd	17.38 m
2015	World Championships	Beijing, China	14th (q)	17.54 m
2016	World Indoor Championships	Portland, United States	11th	17.10 m
2016	European Championships	Amsterdam, Netherlands	18th (q)	16.26 m
2017	European Cup Winter Throwing	Las Palmas, Spain	12th	16.13 m
2018	European Cup Winter Throwing	Leiria, Portugal	11th	16.55 m
2019	European Cup Winter Throwing	Šamorín, Slovakia	13th	15.91 m
2021	European Indoor Championships	Toruń, Poland	14th (q)	16.90 m

== National titles ==
Rosa won 30 national championships at individual senior level.

- Italian Athletics Championships
  - Shot put: in a row, consecutively from 2005 to 2022 (18)
- Italian Athletics Indoor Championships
  - Shot put: 2006, 2008, 2011, 2013, 2014, 2015, 2016, 2017, 2018, 2019, 2020, 2021 (12)

== See also ==
- Italian Athletics Championships - Multi winners
- Italian all-time lists - Shot put
