= Natallia Mikhnevich =

Belarusian shot putter

Personal information
- Native name: Наталла міхневіч
- Full name: Natallia Mikhneich
- Nationality: Belarusian
- Born: Natallia Kharaneka; May 25, 1982 (age 44) Nevinnomyssk, Soviet Union
- Height: 1.80 m (5 ft 11 in)
- Weight: 96 kg (212 lb)

Sport
- Country: Belarus
- Sport: Athletics
- Event: Shot Put

Achievements and titles
- Personal best: 20.70 m (2008)
Medal record
Women's Athletics
Representing Belarus
Olympic Games
Disqualified	2008 Beijing	Shot put
European Championships
Gold medal – first place	2006 Gothenburg	Shot put
Silver medal – second place	2010 Barcelona	Shot put
Universiade
Gold medal – first place	2005 İzmir	Shot put
- Updated on 25 November 2016

Natallia Mikhnevich (Belarusian: Наталля Міхневіч, née Belarusian: Харанэка, Kharaneka; born May 25, 1982, in Nevinnomyssk, Russian SFSR) is a Belarusian shot putter.

== Career ==
Mikhnevich finished third at the 2000 World Junior Championships, but first appeared on the international athletics scene at the 2004 Olympics, where she finished fifth. She was also fifth at the World Athletics Final later that year, and in 2005 won the bronze medal. In 2006, she won the World Indoor Championships in Russia with a new personal best indoor throw of 19.84 metres. Her outdoor personal best is 20.70 metres, achieved in July 2008 in Grodno.

She originally won a silver medal in women's shot put at the 2008 Summer Olympics but in November 2016 was stripped of that medal after re-analysis of her drug sample tested positive for prohibited substances methandienone and stanozolol. Mikhnevich had previously served a two-year competition ban for the use of a prohibited substance, Stanozolol, lasting from 12 April 2013 to 11 April 2015.

Since March 2007 she is married to Belarusian shot putter Andrei Mikhnevich.

== Achievements ==
Year	Competition	Venue	Position	Event	Notes
Representing Belarus
1999	World Youth Championships	Bydgoszcz, Poland	2nd	Shot put	15.57 m
2000	World Junior Championships	Santiago, Chile	3rd	Shot put	16.40 m
2003	European U23 Championships	Bydgoszcz, Poland	1st	Shot put	17.66 m
2003	Universiade	Daegu, South Korea	5th	Shot put	16.82 m
2004	Olympic Games	Athens, Greece	5th	Shot put	18.96 m
2004	World Athletics Final	Monte Carlo, Monaco	5th	Shot put	17.56 m
2005	World Championships	Helsinki, Finland	6th	Shot put	18.34 m
2005	Universiade	İzmir, Turkey	1st	Shot put	18.86 m
2005	World Athletics Final	Monte Carlo, Monaco	2nd	Shot put	18.80 m
2006	World Indoor Championships	Moscow, Russia	1st	Shot put	19.84 PB
2006	European Championships	Gothenburg, Sweden	1st	Shot put	19.43 m
2006	World Athletics Final	Stuttgart, Germany	1st	Shot put	19.81 m
2006	World Cup	Athens, Greece	4th	Shot put	19.06 m
2008	Olympic Games	Beijing, China	2nd	Shot put	20.28 m
2009	World Championships	Berlin, Germany	4th	Shot put	19.66 m
2010	World Indoor Championships	Doha, Qatar	2nd	Shot put	20.42 m
2010	European Cup Winter Throwing	Arles, France	2nd	Shot put	19.55 m
2010	European Championships	Barcelona, Spain	2nd	Shot put	19.53 m
2011	World Championships	Daegu, South Korea	11th	Shot put	18.47 m
2012	Olympic Games	London, United Kingdom	11th	Shot put	18.42 m
2015	World Championships	Beijing, China	8th	Shot put	18.24 m
