= Anca Heltne =

Romanian shot putter

Medal record

Women's athletics

Representing Romania

European Indoor Championships
Bronze medal – third place	2009 Torino	Shot put

Anca Margareta Heltne, née Vîlceanu (born 1 January 1978 in Câmpulung) is a former Romanian shot putter. She has an indoor personal best of 19.90 m (65 ft 3 1/4 in), achieved in February 2010 in Bucharest. She represented her country at the 2008 Summer Olympics.

In October 2022, Heltne received a lifetime competition ban following a third doping violation.

== Career ==
She finished seventh at the 2005 Summer Universiade. She also competed at the 2007 World Championships and the 2008 Olympic Games without reaching the final round. She then finished eighth at the 2008 World Athletics Final and 2009 World Athletics Final, where the top eight athletes in the world are invited.

She won the bronze medal at the 2009 European Indoor Championships. and the silver medal at the 2009 European Cup Winter Throwing. She won the shot put gold medal at the 2009 Jeux de la Francophonie. She set an outdoor personal best of 19.08 m at the 2009 Moscow World Challenge. Between 27 February 2010 and 31 March 2012 she was disqualified from competition for the use of a prohibited substance, stanozolol. After the birth of her child in 2011 and the expiry of her doping ban, she was back in competition in 2012 and was a finalist at the 2012 European Athletics Championships.

She was seventh in the 2013 European Indoor Championships in Göteborg and 15th in the World Championship in Moscow 2013 World Championships. She won the shot put gold medal at the 2013 Jeux de la Francophonie. She won two IAAF World Challenge meetings in 2013

== Doping violations ==
She finished eleventh at the 2014 IAAF World Indoor Championships but had a positive drug test at the 2014 Romanian indoor championships. She was handed an eight-year doping ban for the use of Methandienone and Dehydrochloromathyltestosterone. She admitted to purchasing Dianabol and Turinabol from an online steroid vendor and provided further information on drug trafficking networks to the Romanian National Anti-Doping Agency. Her coach and husband, Runar Heltne, avoided a ban from coaching after she and another of the coach's athletes, Sergiu Ursu, advised that Runar Heltne was not aware of their doping. In October 2022, Runar Heltne received a five year doping ban to end in 2025.

In October 2022, Heltne received a lifetime competition ban following a third doping violation.

== Family ==
She married Norwegian decathlete Runar Heltne in 2001, and he later became her coach. In 2011, the couple had their first child, a boy named Kristian.
