= Athletics at the 2016 Summer Olympics – Women's shot put =

Women's shot put at the Games of the XXXI Olympiad
- Venue: Olympic Stadium
- Date: 12 August 2016
- Competitors: 36 from 25 nations
- Winning distance: 20.63 m

Medalists
1st place, gold medalist(s)		Michelle Carter	United States
2nd place, silver medalist(s)		Valerie Adams	New Zealand
3rd place, bronze medalist(s)		Anita Márton	Hungary

Official Video Highlights

The women's shot put competition at the 2016 Summer Olympics in Rio de Janeiro, Brazil. The event was held at the Olympic Stadium on 12 August. Each athlete receives three throws in the qualifying round. All who achieve the qualifying distance progress to the final. If less than twelve athletes achieve this mark, then the twelve furthest throwing athletes reach the final. Each finalist is allowed three throws in last round, with the top eight athletes after that point being given three further attempts.

== Summary ==
Valerie Adams entered as the 2-time defending champion having won the Olympic gold medal in 2008 & 2012 (initial champion Nadzeya Ostapchuk remained banned for doping). Adams had regained form, ranking second in the world with 20.19 m, after two injury affected seasons. Christina Schwanitz had won the 2015 World Championships in her absence and had taken gold at the European Championships the previous month with a throw of 20.17 m. Gong Lijiao (the 2015 world runner-up) led the rankings at 20.43 m. Michelle Carter, who had won World Indoor and American titles that year, was the only other woman to have thrown beyond twenty metres that year.

In the qualifying round, Adams was best with her only throw of 19.74 m, while Schwanitz and Carter also went beyond nineteen metres, though Carter took two attempts to get the automatic qualifier. Gong, Anita Márton, and Raven Saunders were the other automatic qualifiers. American Felisha Johnson, who was eighth on the season's lists, was the most prominent athlete who failed to progress to the final.

In the final, Valerie Adams looked set to claim a third straight title. She took the lead after the first round with a 19.79 m and improved her position with a throw of 20.42 m in the second round. Carter sat in second position through all the rounds of the competition with a 19.12 m in the first and 19.82 m in the second (which only briefly held the lead until Adams could throw again). Schwanitz held the bronze medal position in the first round, but was overtaken by Gong in the second. Márton equalled Gong with a third round 19.39, but was still behind on the tiebreaker. In the final round Márton threw a Hungarian record 19.87 m to take over bronze medal position, equalling Carter's best at that point but still down due to the tie breaking second throw. In the final round Carter delivered an unexpected American record of a whopping distance of 20.63 m to take the lead. In the last throw of the competition Adams went beyond twenty metres again but her mark of 20.39 m came up short and Carter succeeded her to the title.

The medals were presented by Barry Maister, IOC member, New Zealand and Geoffrey Gardner, Council Member of the IAAF.

== Schedule ==
All times are Brasília Time (UTC−3).

Date	Time	Round
Friday, 12 August 2016	10:05	Qualifications
Friday, 12 August 2016	22:00	Finals

== Records ==
Prior to the competition, the existing World and Olympic records were as follows.

World record	Natalya Lisovskaya (URS)	22.63 m	Moscow, Soviet Union	7 June 1987
Olympic record	Ilona Slupianek (GDR)	22.41 m	Moscow, Soviet Union	24 July 1980
2016 World leading	Gong Lijiao (CHN)	20.43 m	Halle, Germany	21 May 2016

The following record was established during the competition:

Date	Event	Nationality	Athlete	Distance	Record
12 August	Final	United States	Michelle Carter	20.63 m	2016 World Leading

The following national records were established during the competition:

Country	Athlete	Round	Distance	Notes
Cameroon	Auriole Dongmo (CMR)	Qualifying	17.92 m	
United States	Michelle Carter (USA)	Final	20.63 m	WL
Hungary	Anita Márton (HUN)	Final	19.87 m	

== Results ==
=== Qualification ===
Qualification rule: qualification standard 18.40m (Q) or at least best 12 qualified (q).

Rank	Group	Name	Nationality	#1	#2	#3	Result	Notes
1	A	Valerie Adams	New Zealand	19.74			19.74	Q
2	B	Christina Schwanitz	Germany	19.18			19.18	Q
3	A	Michelle Carter	United States	17.95	19.01		19.01	Q
4	A	Raven Saunders	United States	x	18.83		18.83	Q
5	B	Gong Lijiao	China	18.74			18.74	Q
6	B	Anita Márton	Hungary	18.51			18.51	Q
7	B	Geisa Arcanjo	Brazil	18.27	17.67	x	18.27	q, SB
8	A	Cleopatra Borel	Trinidad and Tobago	16.94	17.78	18.20	18.20	q
9	A	Natalia Duco	Chile	18.18	x	x	18.18	q
10	B	Auriole Dongmo	Cameroon	17.92	17.71	x	17.92	q, NR
11	B	Alena Abramchuk	Belarus	17.78	17.19	16.97	17.78	q
12	A	Aliona Dubitskaya	Belarus	x	x	17.76	17.76	q
13	B	Paulina Guba	Poland	17.70	17.56	x	17.70	
14	B	Felisha Johnson	United States	x	17.64	17.69	17.69	
15	A	Melissa Boekelman	Netherlands	16.97	17.69	x	17.69	
16	A	Bian Ka	China	17.68	17.36	16.84	17.68	
17	B	Yuliya Leantsiuk	Belarus	17.66	x	16.69	17.66	
18	A	Brittany Crew	Canada	16.67	x	17.45	17.45	
19	B	Ahymará Espinoza	Venezuela	x	17.27	16.77	17.27	
20	A	Sara Gambetta	Germany	x	16.93	17.24	17.24	
21	B	Radoslava Mavrodieva	Bulgaria	x	17.11	17.20	17.20	
22	B	Yaniuvis López	Cuba	17.15	x	x	17.15	
23	B	Manpreet Kaur	India	16.68	17.06	16.76	17.06	
24	A	Emel Dereli	Turkey	17.01	16.86	x	17.01	
25	B	Danniel Thomas	Jamaica	16.70	16.43	16.99	16.99	
26	A	Saily Viart	Cuba	15.82	x	16.99	16.99	
27	A	Ol'ha Holodna	Ukraine	16.10	16.35	16.83	16.83	
28	B	Taryn Suttie	Canada	16.55	16.74	16.60	16.74	
29	A	Nwanneka Okwelogu	Nigeria	16.67	x	x	16.67	
30	B	Lena Urbaniak	Germany	16.32	16.62	x	16.62	
31	A	Sandra Lemos	Colombia	16.46	16.46	16.12	16.46	
32	A	Leyla Rajabi	Iran	16.18	16.34	16.16	16.34	
33	A	Gao Yang	China	16.17	15.48	x	16.17	
34	B	Galyna Obleshchuk	Ukraine	15.81	x	x	15.81	
35	A	Dimitriana Surdu	Moldova	15.14	15.17	15.25	15.25	
36	B	Jessica Inchude	Guinea-Bissau	14.12	15.15	14.84	15.15	

=== Final ===
Rank	Name	Nationality	#1	#2	#3	#4	#5	#6	Result	Notes
1st place, gold medalist(s)	Michelle Carter	United States	19.12	19.82	19.44	19.87	19.84	20.63	20.63	NR, WL
2nd place, silver medalist(s)	Valerie Adams	New Zealand	19.79	20.42	19.80	x	x	20.39	20.42	SB
3rd place, bronze medalist(s)	Anita Márton	Hungary	17.60	18.72	19.39	19.38	19.10	19.87	19.87	NR
4	Gong Lijiao	China	18.98	19.39	19.18	x	x	x	19.39	
5	Raven Saunders	United States	18.88	x	x	x	x	19.35	19.35	PB
6	Christina Schwanitz	Germany	19.03	x	x	x	x	18.92	19.03	
7	Cleopatra Borel	Trinidad and Tobago	18.05	18.24	x	17.94	18.37	x	18.37	
8	Aliona Dubitskaya	Belarus	18.00	18.23	x	x	x	x	18.23	
9	Geisa Arcanjo	Brazil	17.50	17.68	18.16	did not advance			18.16	
10	Natalia Duco	Chile	18.07	17.73	17.99	did not advance			18.07	
11	Alena Abramchuk	Belarus	17.37	x	x	did not advance			17.37	
12	Auriole Dongmo	Cameroon	x	16.99	16.82	did not advance			16.99	
