= 2019 European Athletics Indoor Championships – Women's shot put =

Women's shot put event held in 2019 in Glasgow, Scotland

The women's shot put event at the 2019 European Athletics Indoor Championships was held on 1 March at 19:02 (qualification) and on 3 March at 12:20 (final) local time.

== Medalists ==
Gold	Silver	Bronze
Radoslava Mavrodieva; Bulgaria	Christina Schwanitz; Germany	Anita Márton; Hungary

== Records ==
Standing records prior to the 2019 European Athletics Indoor Championships
World record	Helena Fibingerová (TCH)	22.50	Jablonec, Czechoslovakia	19 February 1977
European record	Helena Fibingerová (TCH)	22.50	Jablonec, Czechoslovakia	19 February 1977
Championship record	Helena Fibingerová (TCH)	21.46	San Sebastián, Spain	13 March 1977
World Leading	Christina Schwanitz (GER)	19.54	Leipzig, Germany	16 February 2019
European Leading	Christina Schwanitz (GER)	19.54	Leipzig, Germany	16 February 2019

== Results ==
=== Qualification ===
Qualification: Qualifying performance 18.20 (Q) or at least 8 best performers (q) advance to the Final

Rank	Athlete	Nationality	#1	#2	#3	Result	Note
1	Christina Schwanitz	Germany	19.09			19.09	Q
2	Radoslava Mavrodieva	Bulgaria	18.85			18.85	Q
3	Aliona Dubitskaya	Belarus	18.17	18.68		18.68	Q
4	Klaudia Kardasz	Poland	17.35	17.13	18.63	18.63	Q, PB
5	Sara Gambetta	Germany	18.17	x	16.93	18.17	q, PB
6	Alina Kenzel	Germany	17.63	18.09	x	18.09	q, PB
7	Anita Márton	Hungary	18.05	17.79	x	18.05	q
8	Fanny Roos	Sweden	17.79	x	17.60	17.79	q
9	Dimitriana Surdu	Moldova	17.19	17.65	x	17.65	
10	Sophie McKinna	Great Britain	16.85	17.09	17.18	17.18	
11	Viktoryia Kolb	Belarus	16.93	17.11	16.88	17.11	
12	Alena Abramchuk	Belarus	16.92	x	x	16.92	
13	Olha Holodna	Ukraine	16.07	15.83	16.91	16.91	SB
14	Amelia Strickler	Great Britain	x	16.81	16.26	16.81	
15	Emel Dereli	Turkey	16.79	x	x	16.79	
16	Frida Åkerström	Sweden	16.52	x	15.81	16.52	
17	Úrsula Ruiz	Spain	x	16.34	16.41	16.41	

=== Final ===
Rank	Athlete	Nationality	#1	#2	#3	#4	#5	#6	Result	Note
1st place, gold medalist(s)	Radoslava Mavrodieva	Bulgaria	18.74	18.49	18.60	19.01	19.12	18.96	19.12	PB
2nd place, silver medalist(s)	Christina Schwanitz	Germany	18.77	18.67	19.11	x	x	18.83	19.11	
3rd place, bronze medalist(s)	Anita Márton	Hungary	18.37	18.25	19.00	18.68	18.45	18.61	19.00	SB
4	Aliona Dubitskaya	Belarus	17.61	18.44	18.01	18.71	18.43	17.97	18.71	
5	Klaudia Kardasz	Poland	18.17	18.23	17.89	18.20	17.75	x	18.23	
6	Fanny Roos	Sweden	18.21	18.10	x	x	x	17.64	18.21	
7	Sara Gambetta	Germany	17.60	x	17.51	x	x	x	17.60	
8	Alina Kenzel	Germany	17.55	17.35	x	x	x	x	17.55	
