= 2008 World Junior Championships in Athletics – Women's shot put =

The women's shot put event at the 2008 World Junior Championships in Athletics was held in Bydgoszcz, Poland, at Zawisza Stadium on 9 and 10 July.

== Medalists ==
Gold	Natalia Ducó; Chile
Silver	Melissa Boekelman; Netherlands
Bronze	Ma Qiao; China

== Results ==
=== Final ===
10 July

Rank	Name	Nationality	Attempts						Result	Notes
Rank	Name	Nationality	1	2	3	4	5	6	Result	Notes
1st place, gold medalist(s)	Natalia Ducó	Chile	17.23	x	17.01	17.20	x	x	17.23	
2nd place, silver medalist(s)	Melissa Boekelman	Netherlands	16.16	16.43	16.36	16.36	16.60	x	16.60	
3rd place, bronze medalist(s)	Ma Qiao	China	16.18	16.41	16.55	15.75	16.33	16.39	16.55	
4	Aliona Hryshko	Belarus	16.32	16.27	16.41	16.55	15.87	15.73	16.55	
5	Sophie Kleeberg	Germany	15.68	x	16.01	15.73	16.06	x	16.06	
6	Sandra Lemus	Colombia	x	15.38	14.74	15.92	15.41	x	15.92	
7	Anita Márton	Hungary	15.22	15.74	15.70	15.88	15.70	x	15.88	
8	Lina Berends	Germany	15.68	15.54	15.70	15.43	15.46	15.63	15.70	
9	Meng Qianqian	China	14.10	15.22	14.62				15.22	
10	Chinwe Okoro	United States	15.18	14.23	14.45				15.18	
11	Myriam Lixfe	France	14.03	x	13.73				14.03	
12	Viktoriya Bolbat	Ukraine	x	x	14.01				14.01	

=== Qualifications ===
9 July

==== Group A ====
Rank	Name	Nationality	Attempts			Result	Notes
Rank	Name	Nationality	1	2	3	Result	Notes
1	Natalia Ducó	Chile	17.89	-	-	17.89	Q
2	Sophie Kleeberg	Germany	15.24	15.65	16.20	16.20	Q
3	Ma Qiao	China	15.47	15.84	15.76	15.84	q
4	Anita Márton	Hungary	15.59	15.73	15.71	15.73	q
5	Sandra Lemus	Colombia	15.05	15.72	x	15.72	q
6	Myriam Lixfe	France	15.47	x	14.57	15.47	q
7	Sandra Perković	Croatia	14.59	x	15.03	15.03	
8	Virmante Vaičekonytė	Lithuania	14.53	14.78	13.11	14.78	
9	Rebecca O'Brien	United States	14.32	14.77	13.97	14.77	
10	Kimberley Mulhall	Australia	14.42	14.68	14.71	14.71	
11	Vera Kunova	Russia	14.13	x	14.57	14.57	
12	Walaa Atteya	Egypt	12.79	x	13.75	13.75	
13	Allison Liske	Canada	13.45	x	x	13.45	

==== Group B ====
Rank	Name	Nationality	Attempts			Result	Notes
Rank	Name	Nationality	1	2	3	Result	Notes
1	Melissa Boekelman	Netherlands	16.15	-	-	16.15	Q
2	Aliona Hryshko	Belarus	14.90	14.86	15.92	15.92	q
3	Lina Berends	Germany	15.18	15.71	15.40	15.71	q
4	Chinwe Okoro	United States	14.90	15.31	15.41	15.41	q
5	Viktoriya Bolbat	Ukraine	14.50	15.11	x	15.11	q
6	Meng Qianqian	China	15.04	x	x	15.04	q
7	Julie Labonté	Canada	13.41	14.21	14.96	14.96	
8	Gianni Robard	France	14.72	12.95	13.38	14.72	
9	Zeynep Uzun	Turkey	13.42	14.06	14.49	14.49	
10	Margaret Satupai	Samoa	14.25	14.45	13.38	14.45	
11	Spela Hus	Slovenia	12.24	14.06	13.88	14.06	
12	Lomana Fagatuai	Australia	14.03	13.14	13.48	14.03	

== Participation ==
According to an unofficial count, 25 athletes from 19 countries participated in the event.

- Australia (2)
- Belarus (1)
- Canada (2)
- Chile (1)
- China (2)
- Colombia (1)
- Croatia (1)
- Egypt (1)
- France (2)
- Germany (2)
- Hungary (1)
- Lithuania (1)
- Netherlands (1)
- Russia (1)
- Samoa (1)
- Slovenia (1)
- Turkey (1)
- Ukraine (1)
- United States (2)
