= 2014 European Athletics Championships – Women's shot put =

Women's shot put at the European Athletics Championships

The women's shot put at the 2014 European Athletics Championships took place at the Letzigrund on 15 and 17 August.

== Medalists ==
Gold	Christina Schwanitz; Germany
Silver	Anita Márton; Hungary
Bronze	Yuliya Leantsiuk; Belarus

== Records ==
Standing records prior to the 2014 European Athletics Championships
World record	Natalya Lisovskaya (URS)	22.63 m	Moscow, Soviet Union	7 June 1987
European record	Natalya Lisovskaya (URS)	22.63 m	Moscow, Soviet Union	7 June 1987
Championship record	Vita Pavlysh (UKR)	21.69 m	Budapest, Hungary	20 August 1998
World Leading	Valerie Adams (NZL)	20.46 m	Wellington, New Zealand	29 March 2014
European Leading	Christina Schwanitz (GER)	20.22 m	Halle, Germany	17 May 2014

== Schedule ==
Date	Time	Round
15 August 2014	10:04	Qualification
17 August 2014	15:00	Final

All times are local times (UTC+2)

== Results ==
=== Qualification ===
17.50 (Q) or at least 12 best performers (q) advanced to the Final.

Rank	Name	Nationality	#1	#2	#3	Mark	Note
1	Christina Schwanitz	Germany	19.35			19.35	Q
2	Yevgeniya Kolodko	Russia	18.32			18.32	Q
3	Aliona Dubitskaya	Belarus	17.39	x	18.07	18.07	Q
4	Alena Kopets	Belarus	17.63			17.63	Q
5	Irina Tarasova	Russia	17.55			17.55	Q
6	Anita Márton	Hungary	17.09	17.28	17.36	17.36	q
7	Yulia Leantsiuk	Belarus	17.35	x	–	17.35	q
8	Olha Holodna	Ukraine	17.32	16.84	17.11	17.32	q
9	Radoslava Mavrodieva	Bulgaria	17.18	16.77	16.96	17.18	q
10	Lena Urbaniak	Germany	16.88	x	17.17	17.17	q
11	Chiara Rosa	Italy	16.23	16.49	16.76	16.76	q
12	Melissa Boekelman	Netherlands	16.39	16.37	16.66	16.66	q
13	Valentina Mužarić	Croatia	16.27	x	x	16.27	
14	Úrsula Ruiz	Spain	15.79	15.70	15.75	15.79	
15	Kätlin Piirimäe	Estonia	15.46	x	15.66	15.66	
16	Frida Åkerström	Sweden	x	14.98	x	14.98	

=== Final ===
Rank	Name	Nationality	#1	#2	#3	#4	#5	#6	Result	Notes
1st place, gold medalist(s)	Christina Schwanitz	Germany	18.87	19.90	19.66	19.79	19.66	x	19.90	
2nd place, silver medalist(s)	Yevgeniya Kolodko	Russia	18.39	18.46	19.09	18.92	18.95	19.39	19.39	SB
3rd place, bronze medalist(s)	Anita Márton	Hungary	17.47	18.53	18.11	19.04	18.00	18.46	19.04	NR
4	Yulia Leantsiuk	Belarus	17.60	17.86	18.68	18.64	18.13	18.34	18.68	
5	Chiara Rosa	Italy	17.59	18.10	17.65	17.48	x	–	18.10	
6	Irina Tarasova	Russia	x	17.50	18.05	x	x	x	18.05	
7	Aliona Dubitskaya	Belarus	x	x	17.71	x	17.95	17.93	17.95	
8	Lena Urbaniak	Germany	17.56	17.77	x	17.37	x	x	17.77	
9	Alena Kopets	Belarus	17.65	x	17.65				17.65	
10	Melissa Boekelman	Netherlands	x	17.09	17.23				17.23	
11	Olha Holodna	Ukraine	x	17.08	x				17.08	
12	Radoslava Mavrodieva	Bulgaria	16.75	16.98	x				16.98	
