= Athletics at the 2013 Summer Universiade – Women's shot put =

The women's shot put event at the 2013 Summer Universiade was held on 10–11 July.

== Medalists ==
Gold	Silver	Bronze
Liu Xiangrong; China	Natalia Ducó; Chile	Anita Martón; Hungary

On 12 August 2022, the results of Russian Irina Tarasova between July 2012 and July 2016 were annulled by the Athletics Integrity Unit for doping violation. This means that her gold medal in the women's shot put has been stripped.

== Results ==
=== Qualification ===
Qualification: 17.00 m (Q) or at least 12 best (q) qualified for the final.

Rank	Group	Athlete	Nationality	#1	#2	#3	Result	Notes
1	A	Liu Xiangrong	China	16.51	18.01		18.01	Q
2	B	Irina Tarasova	Russia	x	17.76		17.76	Q
3	B	Felisha Johnson	United States	17.62			17.62	Q
4	B	Natalia Ducó	Chile	17.48			17.48	Q
5	B	Julie Labonté	Canada	17.46			17.46	Q
6	A	Anita Márton	Hungary	x	16.80	17.45	17.45	Q
7	B	Aliona Dubitskaya	Belarus	17.06			17.06	Q
8	A	Jeneva McCall	United States	16.44	16.99	16.13	16.99	q
9	B	Sophie Kleeberg	Germany	x	16.71	16.36	16.71	q
10	B	Terina Keenan	New Zealand	15.74	15.00	14.92	15.74	q
11	A	Chelsea Whalen	Canada	x	x	15.36	15.36	q
12	A	Olesya Sviridova	Russia	13.63	14.61	14.95	14.95	q
13	A	Frida Åkerström	Sweden	14.30	14.64	14.78	14.78	
14	A	Ivana Gallardo	Chile	14.08	13.68	x	14.08	PB
15	A	Fadya El Kasaby	Egypt	13.48	13.89	13.60	13.89	
16	A	Charlene Engelbrecht	Namibia	13.56	x	13.40	13.56	
17	B	Silje Disserud	Norway	12.51	12.36	13.22	13.22	
18	A	Špela Hus	Slovenia	12.39	13.08	x	13.08	
19	A	Janeth Acan	Uganda	11.03	11.38	10.77	11.38	
20	B	Devni Madurapperuma	Sri Lanka	10.01	10.10	10.39	10.39	
	A	Rosemary Kaputula	Zambia				DNS	
	B	Kellyane Ntumba Nzembele	Democratic Republic of the Congo				DNS	
	B	Patience Sigauke	Zimbabwe				DNS	
	B	Omotayo Talabi	Nigeria				DNS	

=== Final ===
Rank	Athlete	Nationality	#1	#2	#3	#4	#5	#6	Result	Notes
1st place, gold medalist(s)	Irina Tarasova	Russia	18.39	17.89	x	17.71	18.75	x	18.75	DSQ (doping violation)
2nd place, silver medalist(s)	Liu Xiangrong	China	18.19	18.55	18.32	17.95	18.30	18.58	18.58	
3rd place, bronze medalist(s)	Natalia Ducó	Chile	17.89	x	x	x	17.96	17.76	17.96	
4	Anita Márton	Hungary	16.86	17.92	17.28	17.78	17.52	17.70	17.92	
5	Aliona Dubitskaya	Belarus	17.12	17.30	x	16.61	17.88	x	17.88	SB
6	Julie Labonté	Canada	16.77	x	17.17	x	17.60	17.27	17.60	
7	Felisha Johnson	United States	17.16	x	17.47	16.60	16.71	15.95	17.47	
8	Jeneva McCall	United States	17.04	16.60	16.71	17.01	16.61	16.11	17.04	
9	Sophie Kleeberg	Germany	x	16.49	16.90				16.90	
10	Terina Keenan	New Zealand	16.11	15.75	15.44				16.11	PB
11	Chelsea Whalen	Canada	14.58	15.52	x				15.52	
12	Olesya Sviridova	Russia	14.43	15.47	x				15.47	
