= 2013 World Championships in Athletics – Women's shot put =

Women's shot put at the 2013 World Championships
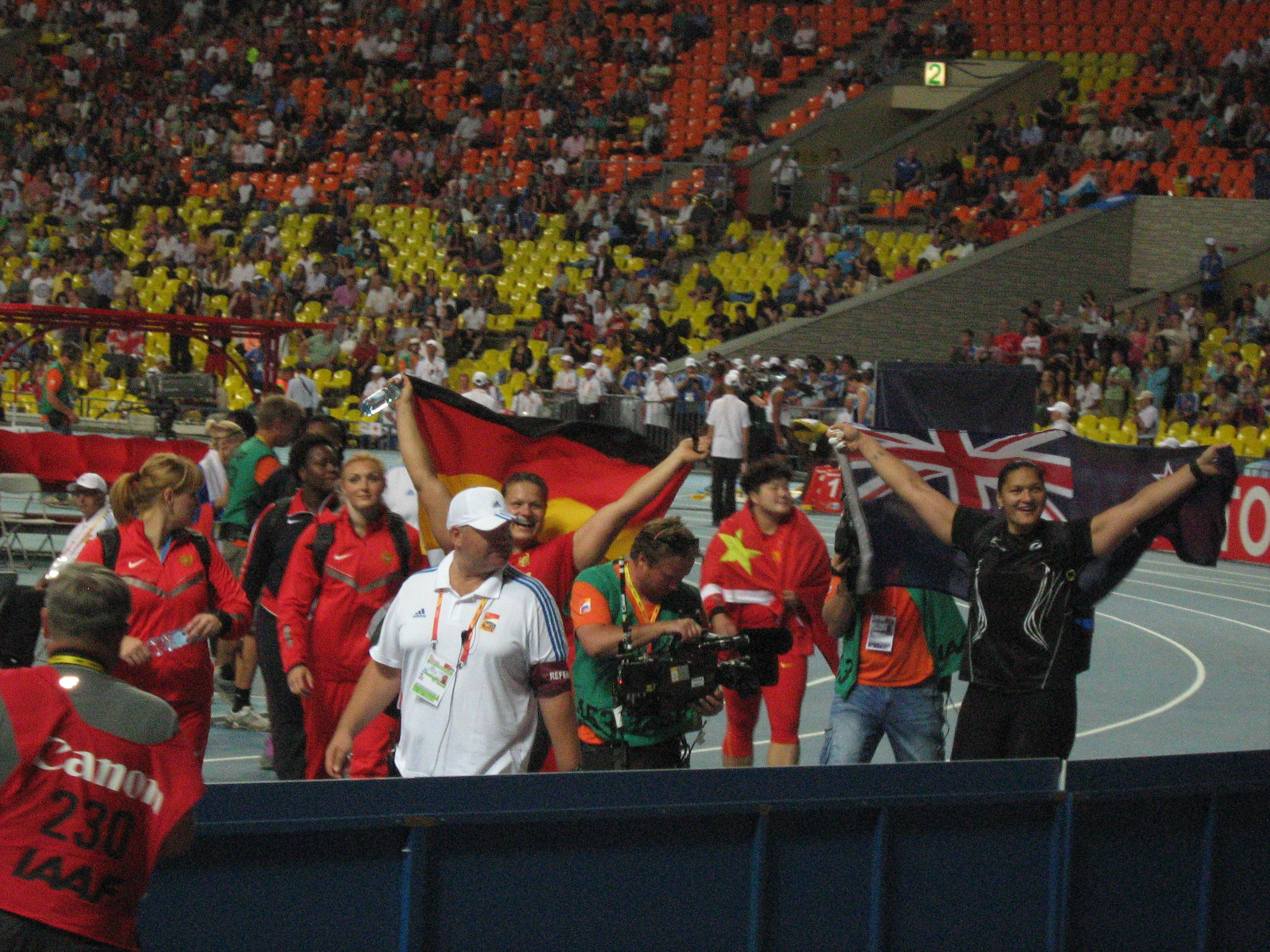
- Venue: Luzhniki Stadium
- Dates: 11 August (qualification); 12 August (final)
- Competitors: 29 from 21 nations
- Winning distance: 20.88 m (68 ft 6 in)

Medalists
gold medal	Valerie Adams; New Zealand
silver medal	Christina Schwanitz; Germany
bronze medal	Gong Lijiao; China

The women's shot put at the 2013 World Championships in Athletics was held at the Luzhniki Stadium on 11–12 August.

Over the previous 6 years, Valerie Adams had been virtually unbeatable by any legal thrower. This year was more of the same. From the home of the world record (more than 26 years earlier), she took the lead on her first toss at a distance only one other competitor would equal in the competition. Michelle Carter moved into second place with her first round 19.92, while she improved it slightly in the second round, Gong Lijiao threw one centimeter better. Meanwhile, Adams improved on her second and third attempts, reaching 20.88. m. That would be the competition until the final round, when Christina Schwanitz pulled out at 21 cm personal best improvement to rocket from fifth place into second.

== Records ==
Prior to the competition, the records were as follows (in m.):

World record	Natalya Lisovskaya (URS)	22.63	Moscow, Soviet Union	7 June 1987
Championship record	Natalya Lisovskaya (URS)	21.24	Rome, Italy	5 September 1987
World leading	Valerie Adams (NZL)	20.90	London, United Kingdom	27 July 2013
African record	Vivian Chukwuemeka (NGR)	18.43	Walnut, United States	19 April 2003
Asian record	Li Meisu (CHN)	21.76	Shijiazhuang, People's Republic of China	23 April 1988
North, Central American and Caribbean record	Belsy Laza (CUB)	20.96A	Mexico City, Mexico	2 May 1992
South American record	Elisângela Adriano (BRA)	19.30A	Tunja, Colombia	14 July 2001
European record	Natalya Lisovskaya (URS)	22.63	Moscow, Soviet Union	7 June 1987
Oceanian record	Valerie Adams (NZL)	21.24	Daegu, South Korea	29 August 2011

== Qualification standards ==
A result	B result
18.30	17.20

== Schedule ==
Date	Time	Round
11 August 2013	10:45	Qualification
12 August 2013	20:25	Final

All times are local times (UTC+4)

== Results ==
KEY:	Q	Qualified	q	12 best performers	NR	National record	PB	Personal best	SB	Seasonal best

=== Qualification ===
Qualification: Qualifying Performance 18.70 (Q) or at least 12 best performers (q) advance to the final.

Rank	Group	Athlete	Nationality	No. 1	No. 2	No. 3	Result	Notes
1	A	Valerie Adams	New Zealand	19.89			19.89	Q
2	B	Michelle Carter	United States	18.29	19.76		19.76	Q
3	A	Yevgeniya Kolodko	Russia	19.55			19.55	Q
4	B	Christina Schwanitz	Germany	18.06	19.18		19.18	Q
5	A	Gong Lijiao	China	18.88			18.88	Q
6	A	Liu Xiangrong	China	18.54	18.11	18.68	18.68	q
7	B	Irina Tarasova	Russia	18.37	x	18.19	18.37	q
8	B	Natalia Ducó	Chile	17.73	17.78	18.28	18.28	q, SB
9	B	Li Ling	China	18.13	x	18.19	18.19	q
10	B	Halyna Obleshchuk	Ukraine	18.04	x	17.82	18.04	q
11	A	Tia Brooks	United States	17.92	17.68	17.75	17.92	q
12	B	Alena Kopets	Belarus	16.68	17.87	17.50	17.87	q
13	A	Josephine Terlecki	Germany	17.87	x	x	17.87	
14	A	Cleopatra Borel-Brown	Trinidad and Tobago	16.90	17.84	17.02	17.84	SB
15	A	Anca Heltne	Romania	17.76	17.46	x	17.76	
16	A	Yuliya Leantsiuk	Belarus	16.93	17.09	17.73	17.73	
17	A	Sandra Lemos	Colombia	17.55	17.48	x	17.55	
18	B	Geisa Arcanjo	Brazil	17.55	x	x	17.55	
19	B	Radoslava Mavrodieva Yankova	Bulgaria	17.34	17.16	17.33	17.34	
20	A	Anita Márton	Hungary	16.98	17.32	16.99	17.32	
21	A	Ol'ha Holodna	Ukraine	17.21	x	17.17	17.21	
22	B	Chiara Rosa	Italy	17.18	x	16.71	17.18	
23	B	Úrsula Ruiz	Spain	16.64	16.99	17.14	17.14	
24	B	Ahymara Espinoza	Venezuela	16.24	16.86	16.39	16.86	
25	B	Yaniuvis López	Cuba	x	16.82	16.56	16.82	
26	A	Emel Dereli	Turkey	16.58	16.03	16.60	16.60	
27	B	Aliona Dubitskaya	Belarus	x	16.37	16.53	16.53	
28	A	Valentina Muzaric	Croatia	16.47	x	16.44	16.47	
29	B	Alyssa Hasslen	United States	15.93	15.67	15.97	15.97	
	A	Leila Rajabi	Iran				DNS	

=== Final ===
The final was held at 20:25.

Rank	Athlete	Nationality	No. 1	No. 2	No. 3	No. 4	No. 5	No. 6	Result	Notes
1st place, gold medalist(s)	Valerie Adams	New Zealand	20.41	20.46	20.88	x	20.76	20.32	20.88	
2nd place, silver medalist(s)	Christina Schwanitz	Germany	19.22	19.72	19.61	19.42	19.74	20.41	20.41	PB
3rd place, bronze medalist(s)	Gong Lijiao	China	19.16	19.95	19.74	x	19.37	19.77	19.95	
4	Michelle Carter	United States	19.92	19.94	19.35	x	19.67	19.57	19.94	
5	Yevgeniya Kolodko	Russia	18.97	19.49	19.40	19.81	x	x	19.81	
6	Li Ling	China	18.30	17.97	18.18	17.68	18.39	18.32	18.39	
7	Irina Tarasova	Russia	18.06	17.82	18.08	18.31	x	18.37	18.37	
8	Tia Brooks	United States	18.09	x	17.94	17.73	x	17.49	18.09	
9	Halyna Obleshchuk	Ukraine	16.84	18.08	17.92				18.08	
10	Liu Xiangrong	China	x	18.04	17.92				18.04	
11	Natalia Ducó	Chile	18.58	x	18.02				18.02	
12	Alena Kopets	Belarus	x	17.24	17.70				17.70	
