= Felisha Johnson =

American shot putter (b. 1989)

Felisha Johnson OLY
Personal information
- Full name: Felisha Nayomie Johnson
- Nationality: American
- Born: July 24, 1989 (age 37) Indianapolis, Indiana, U.S.

Sport
- Country: United States
- Sport: Track and field
- Events: Shot put, weight throw
- College team: Indiana State Sycamores

Achievements and titles
- Personal bests: Shot put: 19.26 m (63 ft 2 1/4 in) (2016); Weight throw: 23.53 m (77 ft 2 1/4 in) (2016); Discus throw: 55.03 m (180 ft 6 1/2 in) (2012); Hammer throw: 61.14 m (200 ft 7 in) (2011)

Felisha Nayomie Johnson (born July 24, 1989) is an American retired track and field athlete who competed in shot put. She represented the United States at the 2016 Summer Olympics in Rio de Janeiro, Brazil. She was also the 2015 national indoor champion in the weight throw and won two NCAA collegiate titles in the event for the Indiana State Sycamores.

== Early life and education ==
Johnson was born in Indianapolis, Indiana, to Ronald and Loesker Johnson. She is a graduate of Lawrence North High School, where she played basketball and competed in shot put and discus. She earned a bachelor of science in recreation and sport management from Indiana State University, where she also competed in track and field for the Indiana State Sycamores.

== Career ==
=== High school and collegiate ===
Johnson won two Indiana state titles for shot put and discus in her junior and senior years at Lawrence North High School and holds records in both events.

She gained a scholarship to study sports management at Indiana State University. She redshirted her first academic year and only began competing athletically for the Indiana State Sycamores from 2010 onwards.

In her first year for the Sycamores she was a Missouri Valley Conference (MVC) finalist but did not reach the NCAA level. She broke through in the 2011 season, winning the weight throw at the 2011 NCAA Women's Division I Indoor Track and Field Championships with a personal best of 22.69 m (74 ft 5 1/4 in). She competed at the NCAA Outdoor Championships that season in both shot put and hammer throw. She did not achieve the same success in 2012: she was third at the MVC Indoor Championships in both shot and weight throw, then did not defend her NCAA title, coming fourth in the weight throw. Outdoors she took third places in shot put and discus throw at the MVC Championships and was fifth in the shot and 22nd in discus at the NCAA Outdoors. She competed at the 2012 United States Olympic Trials and though she did not make the final, she came 13th overall in shot put.

Johnson's final year at Indiana State was her most successful. She won the weight throw at the NCAA Indoor Championships for a second time with a new best of 23.52 m (77 ft 1 3/4 in) – this moved her up to tenth on the all-time lists. Johnson's title win came ten years after her coach, Erin Gilreath, had won the same title. She was also eighth in shot put at the NCAA Indoor Championships and came fourth in the weight throw at the 2013 USA Indoor Track and Field Championships, her best senior national placing at that point. She also won her first MVC Indoor title in the weight throw and was the shot put runner-up. A school record of 17.80 m (58 ft 4 3/4 in) in the shot put came at the Indiana Relays. She improved the outdoor shot put school record with a throw of 18.27 m (59 ft 11 1/4 in) in May. At the MVC Outdoors she won both shot put and discus events, as well as taking fourth in the hammer. In her final collegiate nationals, she was third in shot put and 23rd in the hammer at the 2013 NCAA Outdoor Championships. Her last appearances as a college athlete came at the 2013 Summer Universiade, where on her international debut for the United States she placed seventh in the shot put.

=== Professional ===
After graduating college in 2013, Johnson turned professional. At the 2013 USA Outdoor Track and Field Championships she placed fifth. In the 2014 season she signed a contract with Nike, Inc. and placed herself among the world's top shot putters. She came third at the 2014 USA Indoor Track and Field Championships behind Michelle Carter and Jeneva Stevens, then improved to second place behind Carter at the 2014 USA Outdoor Track and Field Championships, setting a new personal record of 19.18 m (62 ft 11 in) in the process. Track & Field News placed her seventh on their global lists that year.

Johnson achieved her first national title at the 2015 USA Indoor Track and Field Championships with a personal best of 23.45 m (76 ft 11 in). She competed on the international Diamond League circuit for the first time and set her season's best mark of 18.73 m (61 ft 5 1/4 in) in Beijing, placing third. She took sixth place at the 2015 USA Outdoor Championships with a throw of 18.24 m (59 ft 10 in).

She returned to top form in the 2016 season. A new personal record of 23.53 m (77 ft 2 1/4 in) in the weight throw at the 2016 USA Indoor Track and Field Championships brought her only third behind Gwen Berry and Amber Campbell in a high quality competition. In the outdoor season she threw a shot put best of 19.26 m (63 ft 2 1/4 in) then came close to that mark to place third at the 2016 United States Olympic Trials, earning her a place on an U.S. Olympic team.

Johnson competed at the 2016 Summer Olympics in Rio de Janeiro, but did not qualify for the finals. She placed 14th with a throw of 17.69 m (58 ft 1/4 in).

=== Coaching ===
Johnson joined the coaching staff of the Anderson University Ravens during the 2019–2020 season. As of 2023, she is assistant coach of the Montana Tech Orediggers track and field team.

== Competition history ==
All results are taken from World Athletics.

=== International competitions ===
Representing the United States
Year	Competition	Venue	Position	Event	Result
2013	Universiade	Kazan, Russia	6th	Shot put	17.47 m (57 ft 3 3/4 in)
2016	Olympic Games	Rio de Janeiro, Brazil	14th	Shot put	17.69 m (58 ft 1/4 in)

=== National competitions ===
Year	Competition	Venue	Position	Event	Result
2013	USA Indoor Championships	Albuquerque, New Mexico	4th	Weight throw	22.27 m (73 ft 3/4 in)
2014	USA Indoor Championships	Albuquerque, New Mexico	3rd	Shot put	17.94 m (58 ft 10 1/4 in)
2014	USA Indoor Championships	Albuquerque, New Mexico	4th	Weight throw	22.60 m (74 ft 1 3/4 in)
2014	USA Championships	Sacramento, California	2nd	Shot put	19.18 m (62 ft 11 in)
2015	USA Indoor Championships	Albuquerque, New Mexico	5th	Shot put	17.66 m (57 ft 11 1/4 in)
2015	USA Indoor Championships	Albuquerque, New Mexico	1st	Weight throw	23.45 m (76 ft 11 in)
2015	USA Championships	Eugene, Oregon	7th	Shot put	18.24 m (59 ft 10 in)
2016	USA Indoor Championships	Portland, Oregon	5th	Shot put	18.29 m (60 ft 0 in)
2016	USA Indoor Championships	Portland, Oregon	2nd	Weight throw	23.53 m (77 ft 2 1/4 in)
2016	United States Olympic Trials	Eugene, Oregon	3rd	Shot put	19.23 m (63 ft 1 in)
2017	USA Indoor Championships	Albuquerque, New Mexico	3rd	Shot put	18.23 m (59 ft 9 1/2 in)
2017	USA Indoor Championships	Albuquerque, New Mexico	3rd	Weight throw	24.22 m (79 ft 5 1/2 in)
2017	USA Championships	Sacramento, California	5th	Shot put	18.64 m (61 ft 1 3/4 in)
2018	USA Indoor Championships	Albuquerque, New Mexico	8th	Shot put	16.93 m (55 ft 6 1/2 in)
2018	USA Indoor Championships	Albuquerque, New Mexico	8th	Weight throw	19.45 m (63 ft 9 1/2 in)
2020	USA Indoor Championships	Albuquerque, New Mexico	9th	Shot put	17.02 m (55 ft 10 in)
2020	USA Indoor Championships	Albuquerque, New Mexico	4th	Weight throw	22.67 m (74 ft 4 1/2 in)
2021	United States Olympic Trials	Eugene, Oregon	—N/a	Shot put	NM
2022	USA Indoor Championships	Spokane, Washington	6th	Shot put	16.99 m (55 ft 8 3/4 in)
2023	USA Indoor Championships	Albuquerque, New Mexico	4th	Shot put	17.53 m (57 ft 6 in)

=== NCAA titles ===
- NCAA Women's Division I Indoor Track and Field Championships
  - Weight throw: 2011, 2013
