= Athletics at the 2015 Pan American Games – Women's shot put =

Women's shot put at the 2015 Pan American Games
- Venue: CIBC Pan Am and Parapan Am Athletics Stadium
- Dates: July 22
- Competitors: 11 from 8 nations
- Winning distance: 18.67 m

Medalists
Gold medal	Cleopatra Borel	Trinidad and Tobago
Silver medal	Jillian Camarena-Williams	United States
Bronze medal	Natalia Ducó	Chile

The women's shot put competition of the athletics events at the 2015 Pan American Games took place on July 22 at the CIBC Pan Am and Parapan Am Athletics Stadium. The defending Pan American Games champion is Misleydis González of Cuba.

== Records ==
Prior to this competition, the existing world and Pan American Games records were as follows:

World record	Natalya Lisovskaya (URS)	22.63	Moscow, Soviet Union	June 7, 1987
Pan American Games record	María Elena Sarría (CUB)	19.34	Caracas, Venezuela	August 28, 1983

== Qualification ==
Each National Olympic Committee (NOC) was able to enter up to two entrants providing they had met the minimum standard (15.82) in the qualifying period (January 1, 2014 to June 28, 2015).

== Schedule ==
Date	Time	Round
July 22, 2015	18:45	Final

== Results ==
All results shown are in meters.

KEY:	q	Best non-qualifiers	Q	Qualified	NR	National record	PB	Personal best	SB	Seasonal best	DQ	Disqualified

=== Final ===
Rank	Name	Nationality	#1	#2	#3	#4	#5	#6	Mark	Notes
1st place, gold medalist(s)	Cleopatra Borel	Trinidad and Tobago	18.39	18.67	18.56	18.24	x	17.81	18.67	
2nd place, silver medalist(s)	Jillian Camarena-Williams	United States	17.90	18.57	x	17.93	18.27	18.65	18.65	
3rd place, bronze medalist(s)	Natalia Ducó	Chile	17.32	17.84	x	17.70	17.41	18.01	18.01	SB
4	Yaniuvis López	Cuba	17.06	17.78	17.17	17.45	17.67	x	17.78	SB
5	Danniel Thomas	Jamaica	x	17.30	17.76	17.64	17.56	x	17.76	PB
6	Jeneva Stevens	United States	16.97	x	17.34	16.88	16.77	17.63	17.63	
7	Saily Viart	Cuba	17.50	x	x	x	16.52	x	17.50	PB
8	Ahymara Espinoza	Venezuela	17.29	x	x	16.79	17.09	x	17.29	
9	Geisa Arcanjo	Brazil	17.18	x	17.17				17.18	
10	Taryn Suttie	Canada	16.47	x	16.80				16.80	
11	Julie Labonté	Canada	x	15.76	15.94				15.94	
