= Simoné du Toit =

South African shot putter

Personal information
- Nationality: South Africa
- Born: 27 September 1988 (age 37)

Sport
- Sport: Athletics
- Event(s): Shot put, Discus Throw
- College team: Southern Methodist University
Medal record
Women's athletics
Representing South Africa
All-Africa Games
Silver medal – second place	2007 Algiers	Shot put
African Championships
Bronze medal – third place	2008 Addis Ababa	Discus throw
World Youth Championships
Gold medal – first place	2005 Marrakesh	Shot Put
Silver medal – second place	2005 Marrakesh	Discus throw

Simoné du Toit (born 27 September 1988) is a South African shot putter.

Her personal best throw is 17.13 metres, achieved in October 2005 in Naboomspruit. In the discus throw she has 53.07 metres, achieved in February 2006 in Roodepoort.

== Career ==
Du Toit's all time furthest throws include the furthest throw for a 13-year-old in the world. World leading distance in Morocco at the World Youth Games 2006. African Record in discus. Second best distance of all time in South African history in both events, shot put and discus.

== Personal life ==
Du Toit graduated from Southern Methodist University in Dallas, Texas, in December 2011. She achieved as an NCAA athlete and collected several C- USA athlete of the week awards. Du Toit was the recipient of the prestigious Student athlete of the year 2010 award for All sports at SMU.

She used to working at QuickBooks as the manager of HR and payroll. Nowadays she takes a more relaxing approach to life since being engaged to Henry Brown, a successful business man from Centurion, Pretoria. Du Toit also coaches athletics at Hoerskool Kempton Park. Her athletic group consist of about 20 athletes from which there are several SA champions.

Simoné has two sisters, Danell du Toit and Chane du Toit who both live in Kempton Park. Danell du Toit, age 16, goes to the same highschool that her eldest sister went to in Kempton Park.

Simoné's father, Boesman du Toit, an old Northern Transvaal and Transvaal rugby player, was also her coach.

== Achievements ==
Year	Competition	Venue	Position	Event	Notes
Representing South Africa
2003	World Youth Championships	Sherbrooke, Canada	8th	Shot put	14.14 m
2003	World Youth Championships	Sherbrooke, Canada	13th (q)	Discus throw	38.86 m
2004	World Junior Championships	Grosseto, Italy	13th (q)	Shot put	15.16 m
2005	World Youth Championships	Marrakesh, Morocco	1st	Shot put	16.33 m
2005	World Youth Championships	Marrakesh, Morocco	2nd	Discus throw	52.10 m
2006	Commonwealth Games	Melbourne, Australia	6th	Shot put	16.52 m
2006	World Junior Championships	Beijing, China	4th	Shot put	16.95 m
2006	World Junior Championships	Beijing, China	6th	Discus throw	52.39 m
2007	All-Africa Games	Algiers, Algeria	2nd	Shot put	16.77 m
2007	Universiade	Bangkok, Thailand	4th	Shot put	16.80 m
2008	African Championships	Addis Ababa, Ethiopia	5th	Shot put	15.33 m
2008	African Championships	Addis Ababa, Ethiopia	3rd	Discus throw	47.10 m
2009	Universiade	Belgrade, Serbia	9th	Shot put	14.75 m
2009	Universiade	Belgrade, Serbia	14th (q)	Discus throw	51.27 m
2011	Universiade	Shenzhen, China	8th	Shot put	16.78 m
2011	Universiade	Shenzhen, China	8th	Discus throw	53.97 m
2011	World Championships	Daegu, South Korea	24th (q)	Shot put	15.83 m
