= Taryn Suttie =

Canadian shot putter

Personal information
- Born: December 7, 1990 (age 35) Saskatoon, Saskatchewan
- Height: 183 cm (6 ft 0 in)

Sport
- Country: Canada
- Event: Shot put

Achievements and titles
- Personal best: 17.88 m (2016)

Taryn Suttie (born December 7, 1990 in Saskatoon) is a Canadian track and field athlete competing in the shot put.

In competitions for juniors or students, she finished ninth at the 2011 Summer Universiade and won the bronze medal at the 2012 NACAC U23 Championships.

In 2015 she became Canadian champion for the first time, and finished tenth at the 2015 Pan American Games in Toronto. In July 2016, she was officially named to Canada's Olympic team. She was knocked out in the qualifying round there, with the same thing happening at the 2017 World Championships. Her last year of international competition was 2018, when she finished eighth at the 2018 Commonwealth Games.

Her personal best throw was 17.88 metres, achieved in April 2016 in Tempe.
