= Yevgeniya Kolodko =

Russian shot putter (born 1990)

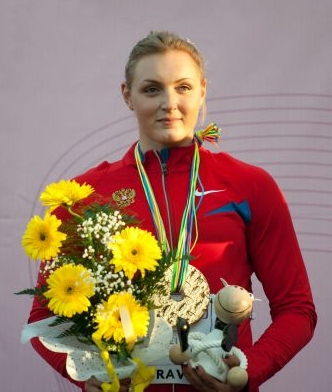
- Yevgeniya Kolodko at the 2011 U23 European Championship in Ostrava

Personal information
- Born: 22 July 1990 (age 35) Neryungri, Russian SFSR, Soviet Union
- Height: 1.82 m (5 ft 11 1/2 in)
- Weight: 92 kg (203 lb)

Sport
- Country: Russia
- Sport: Women's athletics
- Event: Shot put
Medal record
Olympic Games
Disqualified	2012 London	Shot put
European Championships
Disqualified	2014 Zürich	Shot put
European Indoors Championships
Disqualified	2013 Gothenburg	Shot put

Yevgeniya Nikolayevna Kolodko (Russian: Евгения Николаевна Колодко; born 22 July 1990) is a retired Russian shot putter.

== Career ==
Kolodko was initially awarded the bronze medal in the shot put competition at the 2012 Summer Olympics in London, upgraded to silver on the disqualification of Nadzeya Ostapchuk, after recording her personal best of 20.48 m. In 2016, she was stripped of the medal after reanalysis of her samples from the event resulted in a positive test for the prohibited substances turinabol and ipamorelin.

Kolodko won silver medals at the 2013 European Athletics Indoor Championships in Gothenburg (disqualified in 2017) and at the 2014 European Athletics Championships in Zurich (disqualified in 2023).

== Personal life ==
Kolodko was born on 22 July 1990 in Neryungri, Siberia. In September 2015, she married the Canadian shot putter Dylan Armstrong, whom she had dated since 2012.

== International competitions ==
Representing Russia
Year	Competition	Venue	Position	Event	Result	Notes
2009	European Junior Championships	Novi Sad, Serbia	9th	Shot put	14.50 m	
2011	European U23 Championships	Ostrava, Czech Republic	1st	Shot put	18.87 m	
2011	World Championships	Daegu, South Korea	5th	Shot put	19.78 m	
2012	World Indoor Championships	Istanbul, Turkey	7th	Shot put	18.57 m	
2012	Olympic Games	London, United Kingdom	DQ (3rd)	Shot put	20.48 m	Doping
2013	European Indoor Championships	Gothenburg, Sweden	DQ (2nd)	Shot put	19.04 m	Doping
2013	World Championships	Moscow, Russia	DQ (5th)	Shot put	19.81 m	Doping
2014	World Indoor Championships	Sopot, Poland	DQ (4th)	Shot put	19.11 m	Doping
2014	European Championships	Zürich, Switzerland	DQ (2nd)	Shot put	19.39 m	Doping

== See also ==
- List of doping cases in athletics
- List of stripped Olympic medals
- List of European Athletics Championships medalists (women)
- List of European Athletics Indoor Championships medalists (women)
- Russia at the World Athletics Championships
- Doping in Russia
- Doping at the Olympic Games
- Doping at the World Athletics Championships
