= Josephine Terlecki =

German shot putter

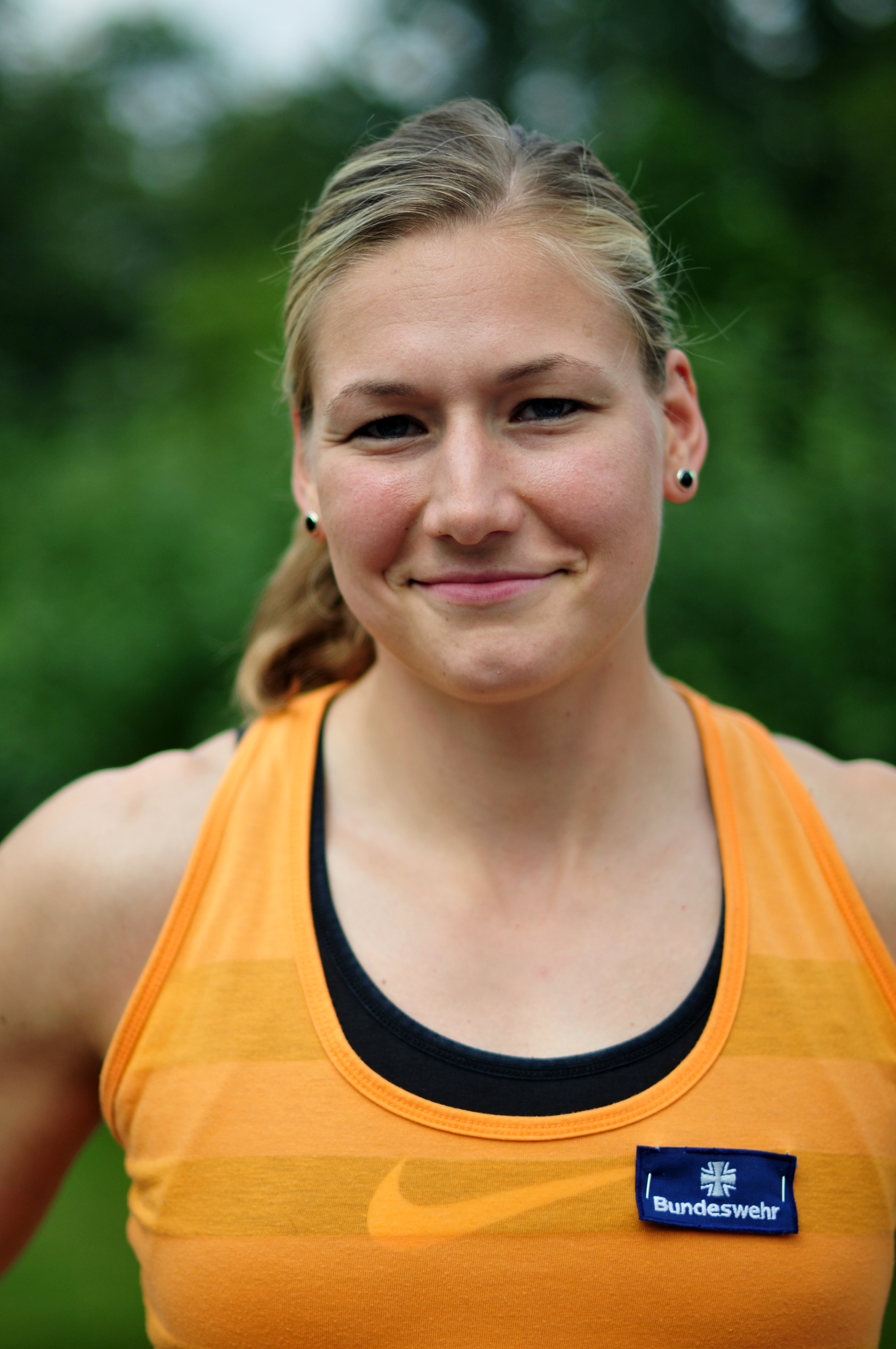
- Terlecki in 2012

Personal information
- Born: February 17, 1986 (age 40) Weimar, East Germany
- Height: 1.83 m (6 ft 0 in)
- Weight: 81 kg (179 lb)

Sport
- Country: Germany
- Sport: Athletics
- Event: Shot Put
- Updated on 6 August 2012

Josephine Terlecki (born 17 February 1986) is a German shot putter. She qualified for the 2012 Summer Olympics but failed to progress from the qualifying round.

== Achievements ==
Year	Competition	Venue	Position	Event	Notes
Representing Germany
2005	European Junior Championships	Kaunas, Lithuania	7th	Shot put	15.63 m
2007	European U23 Championships	Debrecen, Hungary	6th	Shot put	16.53 m
2011	European Indoor Championships	Paris, France	3rd	Shot put	18.09 m
2011	World Championships	Daegu, South Korea	19th (q)	Shot put	17.85 m
2012	European Championships	Helsinki, Finland	4th	Shot put	18.33 m
2012	Olympic Games	London, United Kingdom	18th (q)	Shot put	17.78 m
2013	European Indoor Championships	Gothenburg, Sweden	6th	Shot put	18.16 m
2013	World Championships	Moscow, Russia	13th (q)	Shot put	17.87 m
2014	World Indoor Championships	Sopot, Poland	15th (q)	Shot put	17.11 m
