= Sophie Kleeberg =

German shot putter

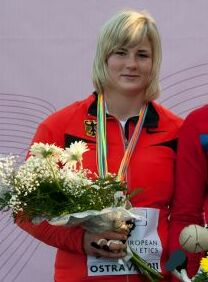
Kleeberg at the 2011 European U23 Championships

Sophie Kleeberg (born 30 May 1990) is a German shot putter.

== Achievements ==
Year	Competition	Venue	Position	Event	Notes
Representing Germany
2007	World Youth Championships	Ostrava, Czech Republic	3rd	Shot put	14.94 m
2008	World Junior Championships	Bydgoszcz, Poland	5th	Shot put	16.06 m
2009	European Junior Championships	Novi Sad, Serbia	3rd	Shot put	15.95 m
2011	European Indoor Championships	Paris, France	6th	Shot put	17.63 m
2011	European U23 Championships	Ostrava, Czech Republic	2nd	Shot put	17.92 m
2011	Universiade	Shenzhen, China	2nd	Shot put	17.48 m
2013	Universiade	Kazan, Russia	9th	Shot put	16.90 m
