= 2016 European Athletics Championships – Women's shot put =

Women's shot put at the European Athletics Championships
- Venue: Olympic Stadium
- Location: Amsterdam
- Dates: 6 July (qualification); 7 July (final)
- Competitors: 27 from 19 nations
- Winning mark: 20.17 m EL

Medalists
gold medal	Christina Schwanitz	Germany
silver medal	Anita Márton	Hungary
bronze medal	Emel Dereli	Turkey

The women's shot put at the 2016 European Athletics Championships took place at the Olympic Stadium on 6 and 7 July.

== Records ==
Standing records prior to the 2016 European Athletics Championships
World record	Natalya Lisovskaya (URS)	22.63 m	Moscow, Soviet Union	7 June 1987
European record	Natalya Lisovskaya (URS)	22.63 m	Moscow, Soviet Union	7 June 1987
Championship record	Vita Pavlysh (UKR)	21.69 m	Budapest, Hungary	20 August 1998
World Leading	Lijiao Gong (CHN)	20.43 m	Halle, Germany	21 May 2016
European Leading	Christina Schwanitz (GER)	19.49 m	Kassel, Germany	19 June 2016

== Schedule ==
Date	Time	Round
6 July 2016	19:10	Qualification
7 July 2016	17:05	Final

All times are local times (UTC+2)

== Results ==
=== Qualification ===
Qualification: 17.30 m (Q) or best 12 performers (q)

Rank	Group	Name	Nationality	#1	#2	#3	Result	Note
1	B	Christina Schwanitz	Germany	19.02			19.02	Q
2	B	Emel Dereli	Turkey	x	17.15	17.88	17.88	Q
3	B	Sara Gambetta	Germany	17.22	17.77		17.77	Q
4	A	Anita Márton	Hungary	17.54			17.54	Q
5	B	Melissa Boekelman	Netherlands	16.62	17.50		17.50	Q
6	A	Aliona Dubitskaya	Belarus	17.45			17.45	Q
7	B	Paulina Guba	Poland	17.44			17.44	Q
8	B	Yulia Leantsiuk	Belarus	16.18	17.35		17.35	Q
9	A	Olha Holodna	Ukraine	x	16.19	17.29	17.29	q
10	A	Radoslava Mavrodieva	Bulgaria	17.01	17.16	x	17.16	q
11	A	Úrsula Ruiz	Spain	16.74	16.03	16.86	16.86	q
12	A	Rachel Wallader	Great Britain	16.86	x	16.48	16.86	q
13	A	Lena Urbaniak	Germany	16.77	16.83	16.64	16.83	
14	A	Jolien Boumkwo	Belgium	16.66	x	16.10	16.66	
15	B	Markéta Cervenková	Czech Republic	16.56	x	15.51	16.56	
16	B	Halyna Obleshchuk	Ukraine	16.30	16.22	15.95	16.30	
17	B	Viktoryia Kolb	Belarus	16.27	16.09	16.17	16.27	
18	A	Chiara Rosa	Italy	15.86	x	16.26	16.26	
19	B	Valentina Mužarić	Croatia	16.02	x	16.17	16.17	
20	B	Fanny Roos	Sweden	16.07	x	16.11	16.11	
21	B	María Belén Toimil	Spain	15.62	15.89	16.00	16.00	
22	A	Kätlin Piirimäe	Estonia	14.31	14.91	15.85	15.85	
23	B	Julaika Nicoletti	Italy	15.37	x	15.81	15.81	
24	A	Giedre Kupstyte	Lithuania	15.63	15.03	15.06	15.63	
25	A	Dimitriana Surdu	Moldova	15.50	14.91	15.27	15.50	
26	A	Stamatia Skarvelis	Greece	14.49	x	15.50	15.50	
27	A	Svitlana Marusenko	Ukraine	14.84	14.78	14.92	14.92	

=== Final ===
Rank	Athlete	Nationality	#1	#2	#3	#4	#5	#6	Result	Notes
1st place, gold medalist(s)	Christina Schwanitz	Germany	20.17	19.28	19.55	x	x	19.46	20.17	EL
2nd place, silver medalist(s)	Anita Márton	Hungary	17.79	18.52	18.72	18.05	18.31	18.63	18.72	
3rd place, bronze medalist(s)	Emel Dereli	Turkey	17.73	17.90	18.22	x	x	x	18.22	
4	Yulia Leantsiuk	Belarus	x	x	17.80	17.53	x	18.20	18.20	
5	Radoslava Mavrodieva	Bulgaria	17.34	x	18.10	x	x	17.54	18.10	
6	Aliona Dubitskaya	Belarus	17.65	17.87	x	18.03	17.78	x	18.03	
7	Sara Gambetta	Germany	17.35	17.95	17.60	x	17.55	x	17.95	PB
8	Melissa Boekelman	Netherlands	17.76	17.62	x	17.45	17.92	17.29	17.92	
9	Olha Holodna	Ukraine	17.65	x	x				17.65	
10	Úrsula Ruiz	Spain	17.14	16.86	x				17.14	SB
11	Paulina Guba	Poland	16.95	x	x				16.95	
12	Rachel Wallader	Great Britain	x	15.77	16.06				16.06	
