= Saily Viart =

Cuban shot putter

Personal information
- Born: 10 September 1995 (age 30) Ciego de Ávila, Cuba
- Height: 1.70 m (5 ft 7 in)
- Weight: 94 kg (207 lb)

Sport
- Sport: Athletics
- Event: Shot put

Saily Viart Despaigne (born 10 September 1995) is a Cuban athlete specialising in the shot put. She represented her country at the 2016 Summer Olympics in Rio de Janeiro without qualifying for the final.

Her personal best in the event is 17.94 metres set in Cali in 2016.

== International competitions ==
Year	Competition	Venue	Position	Event	Notes
Representing Cuba
2014	World Junior Championships	Eugene, United States	9th	Shot put	15.62 m
2014	Pan American Sports Festival	Mexico City, Mexico	7th	Shot put	16.13 m
2014	Central American and Caribbean Games	Xalapa, Mexico	4th	Shot put	17.21 m
2015	Pan American Games	Toronto, Canada	7th	Shot put	17.50 m
2016	NACAC U23 Championships	San Salvador, El Salvador	2nd	Shot put	18.49 m
2016	Olympic Games	Rio de Janeiro, Brazil	22nd (q)	Shot put	17.15 m
