= Athletics at the 2007 Summer Universiade – Women's shot put =

Women's Shot put event in 2007

The women's shot put event at the 2007 Summer Universiade was held on 10 August.

== Results ==
Rank	Athlete	Nationality	#1	#2	#3	#4	#5	$6	Result	Notes
1st place, gold medalist(s)	Irina Tarasova	Russia	17.04	16.92	17.46	17.09	x	x	17.46	
2nd place, silver medalist(s)	Yulia Leantsiuk	Belarus	16.40	17.20	16.93	16.54	x	x	17.20	
3rd place, bronze medalist(s)	Magdalena Sobieszek	Poland	x	x	16.41	16.25	16.88	x	16.88	
4	Simoné du Toit	South Africa	x	16.63	16.64	x	16.80	16.59	16.80	
5	Jessica Cérival	France	16.12	x	15.93	16.53	16.75	x	16.75	
6	Lin Chia-ying	Chinese Taipei	x	16.19	x	15.87	x	15.83	16.19	
7	Alla Denisenko	Russia	15.27	x	14.73	x	15.48	15.41	15.48	
8	Sivan Jean	Israel	14.61	14.97	14.60	14.49	15.17	14.36	15.17	
9	Sivan Abali	Israel	x	x	14.80				14.80	
10	Anu Teesaar	Estonia	14.23	x	14.55				14.55	
11	Annet Kabasindi	Uganda	10.70	10.93	10.55				10.93	
	Yarelys Barrios	Cuba							DNS	
