= Halyna Obleshchuk =

Ukrainian shot putter

Halyna Obleshchuk (Cyrillic: Галина Облещук; born 23 February 1989) is a Ukrainian athlete specialising in the shot put.

== Career ==
She is a member of the Ivano-Frankivsk, U (Cyrillic: Івано-Франківська, У) club.

She represented her country at two consecutive World Championships, in 2013 and 2015, her best result being the ninth place on the first occasion. She has not participated in the Olympics, however she is recognised by the organisation.

Her personal bests in the event are 19.40 metres outdoors (Kiev 2014) and 18.31 metres indoors (Sumy 2014).

Listed Measurements
	Height	Weight
Imperial	5'8" (68')	14.8 stone (207 lbs)
Metric	1.77m (177 cm)	94 kg

== Competition record ==
Year	Competition	Venue	Position	Event	Notes
Representing Ukraine
2011	European Indoor Championships	Paris, France	11th (q)	Shot put	16.21 m
2011	European U23 Championships	Ostrava, Czech Republic	6th	Shot put	16.87 m
2012	World Indoor Championships	Istanbul, Turkey	16th (q)	Shot put	16.39 m
2013	European Indoor Championships	Gothenburg, Sweden	13th (q)	Shot put	16.81 m
2013	World Championships	Moscow, Russia	9th	Shot put	18.08 m
2014	World Indoor Championships	Sopot, Poland	16th (q)	Shot put	16.74 m
2015	World Championships	Beijing, China	19th (q)	Shot put	16.97 m
2016	European Championships	Amsterdam, Netherlands	16th (q)	Shot put	16.30 m
2016	Olympic Games	Rio de Janeiro, Brazil	34th (q)	Shot put	15.81 m
