= Anita Márton =

Hungarian shot putter

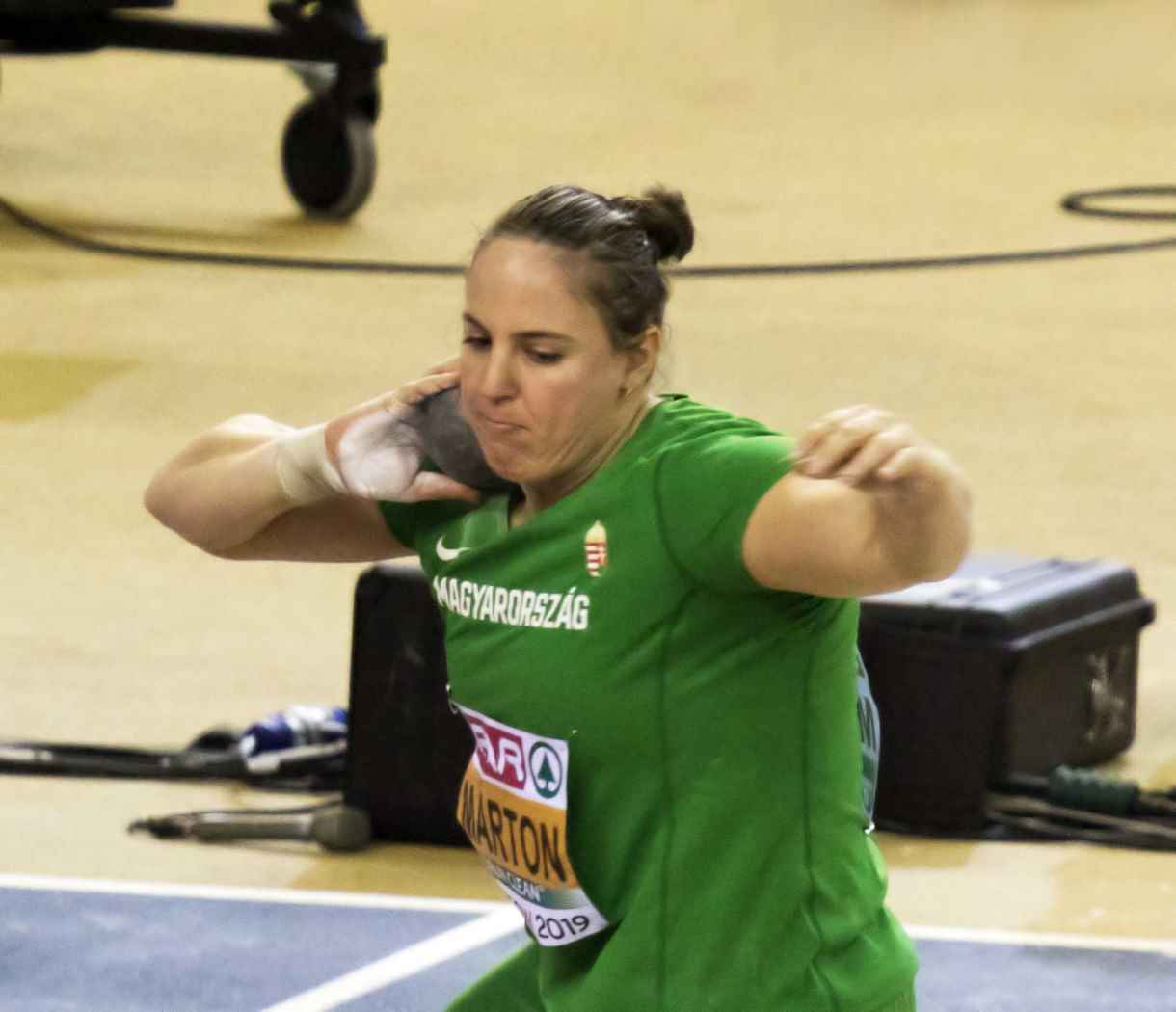
- Anita Márton in 2019

Personal information
- Born: 15 January 1989 (age 37) Szeged, Hungary
- Height: 1.72 m (5 ft 8 in)
- Weight: 90 kg (198 lb)

Sport
- Country: Hungary
- Sport: Athletics
- Event: Shot put

Achievements and titles
- Personal bests: Outdoor: 19.87 (2016); Indoor: 19.62 (2018)
Medal record
Women's athletics
Representing Hungary
Olympic Games
Bronze medal – third place	2016 Rio de Janeiro	Shot put
World Championships
Silver medal – second place	2017 London	Shot put
World Indoor Championships
Gold medal – first place	2018 Birmingham	Shot put
Silver medal – second place	2016 Portland	Shot put
European Championships
Silver medal – second place	2014 Zürich	Shot put
Silver medal – second place	2016 Amsterdam	Shot put
European Indoor Championships
Gold medal – first place	2015 Prague	Shot put
Gold medal – first place	2017 Belgrade	Shot put
Bronze medal – third place	2019 Glasgow	Shot put

Anita Márton (pronounced [ˈɒnitɒ ˈmaːrton]; born 15 January 1989) is a Hungarian shot putter.

== International competitions ==
Year	Competition	Venue	Position	Event	Notes
Representing Hungary
2005	World Youth Championships	Marrakesh Morocco	11th	Shot put	12.79 m
2005	World Youth Championships	Marrakesh Morocco	19th (q)	Discus throw	40.04 m
2006	World Junior Championships	Beijing, China	15th (q)	Shot put	14.87 m
2006	World Junior Championships	Beijing, China	12th	Discus	46.76 m
2007	European Junior Championships	Hengelo, Netherlands	7th	Shot put	15.07 m
2007	European Junior Championships	Hengelo, Netherlands	6th	Discus throw	49.56 m
2008	World Junior Championships	Bydgoszcz, Poland	7th	Shot put	15.88 m
2008	World Junior Championships	Bydgoszcz, Poland	6th	Discus throw	51.16 m
2009	European Indoor Championships	Turin, Italy	13th (q)	Shot put	15.82 m
2009	European U23 Championships	Kaunas, Lithuania	4th	Shot put	17.20 m
2009	European U23 Championships	Kaunas, Lithuania	11th	Discus throw	48.56 m
2009	World Championships	Berlin, Germany	24th (q)	Shot put	16.80 m
2010	World Indoor Championships	Doha, Qatar	17th (q)	Shot put	17.34 m
2010	European Championships	Barcelona, Spain	11th	Shot put	17.78 m
2011	European Indoor Championships	Paris, France	5th	Shot put	17.84 m
2011	European U23 Championships	Ostrava, Czech Republic	5th	Shot put	17.09 m
2011	European U23 Championships	Ostrava, Czech Republic	3rd	Discus throw	54.14 m
2011	Universiade	Shenzhen, China	7th	Shot put	17.01 m
2011	World Championships	Daegu, South Korea	22nd (q)	Shot put	17.04 m
2012	European Championships	Helsinki, Finland	7th	Shot put	17.93 m
2012	Olympic Games	London, United Kingdom	23rd (q)	Shot put	17.48 m
2013	European Indoor Championships	Gothenburg, Sweden	12th (q)	Shot put	17.22 m
2013	Universiade	Kazan, Russia	4th	Shot put	17.92 m
2013	World Championships	Moscow, Russia	20th (q)	Shot put	17.32 m
2014	World Indoor Championships	Sopot, Poland	6th	Shot put	18.17 m
2014	European Championships	Zürich, Switzerland	2nd	Shot put	19.04 m
2015	European Indoor Championships	Prague, Czech Republic	1st	Shot put	19.23 m
2015	World Championships	Beijing, China	4th	Shot put	19.48 m
2016	World Indoor Championships	Portland, United States	2nd	Shot put	19.33 m
2016	European Championships	Amsterdam, Netherlands	2nd	Shot put	18.72 m
2016	Olympic Games	Rio de Janeiro, Brazil	3rd	Shot put	19.87 m
2017	European Indoor Championships	Belgrade, Serbia	1st	Shot put	19.28 m
2017	World Championships	London, United Kingdom	2nd	Shot put	19.49 m
2017	World Championships	London, United Kingdom	24th (q)	Discus throw	55.96 m
2018	World Indoor Championships	Birmingham, United Kingdom	1st	Shot put	19.62 m
2019	European Indoor Championships	Glasgow, United Kingdom	3rd	Shot put	19.00 m
2019	World Championships	Doha, Qatar	5th	Shot put	18.86 m
2021	Olympic Games	Tokyo, Japan	21st (q)	Shot put	17.59 m
2023	European Indoor Championships	Istanbul, Turkey	6th	Shot put	18.28 m
2023	World Championships	Budapest, Hungary	20th (q)	Shot put	17.85 m

== Awards ==
- Hungarian athlete of the Year (3): 2014, 2015, 2016
- Cross of Merit of Hungary – Golden Cross (2004)
