= 2006 World Junior Championships in Athletics – Women's shot put =

The women's shot put event at the 2006 World Junior Championships in Athletics was held in Beijing, China, at Chaoyang Sports Centre on 15 August.

== Medalists ==
| Gold | Melissa Boekelman; Netherlands |
| Silver | Denise Hinrichs; Germany |
| Bronze | Irina Tarasova; Russia |

== Results ==
=== Final ===
15 August

| Rank | Name | Nationality | Attempts | | | | | | Result | Notes |
| Rank | Name | Nationality | 1 | 2 | 3 | 4 | 5 | 6 | Result | Notes |
|---|---|---|---|---|---|---|---|---|---|---|
| 1st place, gold medalist(s) | Melissa Boekelman | Netherlands | 17.66 | 16.56 | 16.56 | 16.55 | x | 16.85 | 17.66 | |
| 2nd place, silver medalist(s) | Denise Hinrichs | Germany | 16.47 | 17.35 | 17.13 | x | 17.18 | x | 17.35 | |
| 3rd place, bronze medalist(s) | Irina Tarasova | Russia | 15.57 | 17.05 | 17.11 | 17.11 | 16.31 | x | 17.11 | |
| 4 | Simoné du Toit | South Africa | 15.99 | 16.09 | 16.82 | 15.63 | 16.23 | 16.95 | 16.95 | |
| 5 | Liu Yingpan | China | 16.21 | 16.71 | x | 16.73 | 16.62 | 16.47 | 16.73 | |
| 6 | Li Li | China | 16.34 | x | 16.11 | 16.17 | 16.18 | x | 16.34 | |
| 7 | Dani Samuels | Australia | 14.50 | 15.71 | 15.48 | 15.27 | 15.44 | 15.12 | 15.71 | |
| 8 | Rocío Comba | Argentina | 15.41 | 15.55 | 14.45 | 15.00 | 14.68 | 14.94 | 15.55 | |
| 9 | Irina Kirichenko | Russia | 15.35 | 14.95 | 15.48 | | | | 15.48 | |
| 10 | Annie Alexander | Trinidad and Tobago | 15.48 | 15.05 | 13.33 | | | | 15.48 | |
| 11 | Kelly Medeiros | Brazil | 13.23 | 13.89 | 14.68 | | | | 14.68 | |
| 12 | Natalia Ducó | Chile | 13.90 | 14.19 | 14.38 | | | | 14.38 | |

=== Qualifications ===
15 August

==== Group A ====
| Rank | Name | Nationality | Attempts | | | Result | Notes |
| Rank | Name | Nationality | 1 | 2 | 3 | Result | Notes |
|---|---|---|---|---|---|---|---|
| 1 | Melissa Boekelman | Netherlands | 16.47 | - | - | 16.47 | Q |
| 2 | Irina Kirichenko | Russia | 14.79 | 15.81 | - | 15.81 | Q |
| 3 | Li Li | China | 15.69 | - | - | 15.69 | Q |
| 4 | Rocío Comba | Argentina | 10.79 | 15.10 | 15.56 | 15.56 | Q |
| 5 | Simoné du Toit | South Africa | 15.46 | - | - | 15.46 | Q |
| 6 | Kelly Medeiros | Brazil | 14.89 | 14.73 | 15.23 | 15.23 | q |
| 7 | Isabell von Loga | Germany | 14.69 | 14.39 | 15.15 | 15.15 | |
| 8 | Tatsiana Varabei | Belarus | 14.37 | 14.42 | 14.17 | 14.42 | |
| 9 | Jere Summers | United States | 14.34 | x | 13.65 | 14.34 | |
| 10 | Johanna Pulkkinen | Finland | x | x | 13.87 | 13.87 | |
| 11 | Elena Carini | Italy | 13.12 | 13.78 | 13.85 | 13.85 | |
| 12 | Mateja Greguric | Croatia | x | 13.61 | 13.73 | 13.73 | |
| 13 | Hung Pao-Chu | Chinese Taipei | x | 13.15 | 13.63 | 13.63 | |
| 14 | Marina Vojinovic | Serbia | 12.15 | 12.45 | 12.37 | 12.45 | |

==== Group B ====
| Rank | Name | Nationality | Attempts | | | Result | Notes |
| Rank | Name | Nationality | 1 | 2 | 3 | Result | Notes |
|---|---|---|---|---|---|---|---|
| 1 | Liu Yingpan | China | x | 16.35 | - | 16.35 | Q |
| 2 | Irina Tarasova | Russia | 16.25 | - | - | 16.25 | Q |
| 3 | Denise Hinrichs | Germany | 16.10 | - | - | 16.10 | Q |
| 4 | Dani Samuels | Australia | 13.73 | 15.96 | - | 15.96 | Q |
| 5 | Annie Alexander | Trinidad and Tobago | x | 14.33 | 15.87 | 15.87 | Q |
| 6 | Natalia Ducó | Chile | 14.60 | x | 15.48 | 15.48 | Q |
| 7 | Zhanna Samolyuk | Ukraine | 15.17 | 14.90 | 15.08 | 15.17 | |
| 8 | Anita Márton | Hungary | 14.87 | 12.46 | 14.59 | 14.87 | |
| 9 | Kamorean Hayes | United States | 14.68 | 13.05 | 14.83 | 14.83 | |
| 10 | Alena Kopets | Belarus | x | 14.77 | 12.39 | 14.77 | |
| 11 | Minnamari Kuossari | Finland | 13.92 | 14.02 | 13.89 | 14.02 | |
| 12 | Kaitlyn Andrews | Canada | 12.66 | 13.04 | 13.99 | 13.99 | |
| 13 | Oksana Kot | Uzbekistan | x | 13.04 | 13.82 | 13.82 | |
| 14 | Florentia Kappa | Cyprus | 13.78 | 13.62 | 13.21 | 13.78 | |
| 15 | Irais Estrada | Mexico | 13.59 | 12.87 | x | 13.59 | |

== Participation ==
According to an unofficial count, 29 athletes from 23 countries participated in the event.

- Argentina (1)
- Australia (1)
- Belarus (2)
- Brazil (1)
- Canada (1)
- Chile (1)
- China (2)
- Chinese Taipei (1)
- Croatia (1)
- Cyprus (1)
- Finland (2)
- Germany (2)
- Hungary (1)
- Italy (1)
- Mexico (1)
- Netherlands (1)
- Russia (2)
- Serbia (1)
- South Africa (1)
- Trinidad and Tobago (1)
- Ukraine (1)
- United States (2)
- Uzbekistan (1)
