= Athletics at the 2018 Commonwealth Games – Women's shot put =

Women's shot put at the 2018 Commonwealth Games
- Venue: Carrara Stadium
- Dates: 12 April (qualifying round); 13 April (final)
- Competitors: 14 from 11 nations
- Winning distance: 19.36 m

Medalists
gold medal	Danniel Thomas-Dodd	Jamaica
silver medal	Valerie Adams	New Zealand
bronze medal	Brittany Crew	Canada

The women's shot put at the 2018 Commonwealth Games, as part of the athletics programme, took place in the Carrara Stadium on 12 and 13 April 2018.

== Records ==
Prior to this competition, the existing world and Games records were as follows:

World record	Natalya Lisovskaya (URS)	22.63 m	Moscow, Soviet Union	7 June 1987
Games record	Valerie Adams (NZL)	20.47 m	Delhi, India	9 October 2010

== Schedule ==
The schedule was as follows:

Date	Time	Round
Thursday 12 April 2018	12:15	Qualification
Friday 13 April 2018	20:40	Final

All times are Australian Eastern Standard Time (UTC+10)

== Results ==
=== Qualifying round ===
Across two groups, those who threw ≥16.50 m (Q) or at least the 12 best performers (q) advanced to the final.

Rank	Group	Athlete	#1	#2	#3	Result	Notes	Qual.
1	B	Valerie Adams (NZL)	18.52			18.52	SB	Q
2	A	Brittany Crew (CAN)	17.50			17.50		Q
3	A	Cleopatra Borel (TTO)	17.46			17.46		Q
4	B	Sophie McKinna (ENG)	17.24			17.24	SB	Q
5	A	Rachel Wallader (ENG)	16.42	16.22	17.20	17.20	SB	Q
6	B	Jess St. John (ANT)	16.34	16.90		16.90	NR	Q
7	B	Danniel Thomas-Dodd (JAM)	16.89			16.89		Q
8	B	Taryn Suttie (CAN)	16.86			16.86		Q
9	A	Amelia Strickler (ENG)	13.50	16.57		16.57	SB	Q
10	B	Salome Mugabe (MOZ)	15.63	x	14.89	15.63	NR	q
11	A	ʻAta Maama Tuutafaiva (TGA)	14.14	14.79	x	14.79		q
12	A	Trevia Gumbs (IVB)	13.65	x	14.03	14.03		q
13	B	Tereapii Tapoki (COK)	11.72	12.60	12.49	12.60		
14	A	Chanana Jeremiah (NRU)	10.12	9.87	x	10.12	SB	

=== Final ===
The medals were determined in the final.

Rank	Name	#1	#2	#3	#4	#5	#6	Result	Notes
1st place, gold medalist(s)	Danniel Thomas-Dodd (JAM)	18.36	18.70	18.57	18.44	19.36	x	19.36	NR
2nd place, silver medalist(s)	Valerie Adams (NZL)	18.70	18.65	18.03	x	18.40	18.55	18.70	SB
3rd place, bronze medalist(s)	Brittany Crew (CAN)	17.30	17.03	17.77	x	17.62	18.32	18.32	
4	Cleopatra Borel (TTO)	17.59	17.82	17.81	18.00	17.68	18.05	18.05	
5	Sophie McKinna (ENG)	16.90	17.70	17.76	x	17.28	x	17.76	PB
6	Rachel Wallader (ENG)	17.05	x	16.41	16.94	17.48	16.70	17.48	SB
7	Jess St. John (ANT)	x	16.53	17.32	x	16.46	x	17.32	NR
8	Taryn Suttie (CAN)	16.43	16.90	16.92	x	x	x	16.92	
9	Amelia Strickler (ENG)	16.78	15.39	16.72	—			16.78	
10	Ata Maama Tuutafaiva (TGA)	15.00	15.36	15.14	—			15.36	PB
11	Salome Mugabe (MOZ)	13.99	14.50	14.98	—			14.98	
12	Trevia Gumbs (IVB)	13.82	13.96	14.12	—			14.12	
