= 2013 European Athletics Indoor Championships – Women's shot put =

The women's shot put event at the 2013 European Athletics Indoor Championships was held on 2 March 2013 at 13:00 (qualification) and 3 March, 11:10 (final) local time.

== Records ==
Standing records prior to the 2013 European Athletics Indoor Championships
| World record | Helena Fibingerová (TCH) | 22.50 | Jablonec, Czechoslovakia | 19 February 1977 |
| European record | Helena Fibingerová (TCH) | 22.50 | Jablonec, Czechoslovakia | 19 February 1977 |
| Championship record | Helena Fibingerová (TCH) | 21.46 | San Sebastián, Spain | 13 March 1977 |
| World Leading | Christina Schwanitz (GER) | 19.79 | Dortmund, Germany | 23 February 2013 |
| European Leading | Christina Schwanitz (GER) | 19.79 | Dortmund, Germany | 23 February 2013 |

== Results ==
=== Qualification ===
Qualification: Qualification Performance 18.00 (Q) or at least 8 best performers advanced to the final.

| Rank | Athlete | Nationality | #1 | #2 | #3 | Result | Note |
|---|---|---|---|---|---|---|---|
| 1 | Christina Schwanitz | Germany | 18.77 | | | 18.77 | Q |
| 2 | Alena Kopets | Belarus | 17.92 | 18.24 | | 18.24 | Q |
| 3 | Irina Tarasova | Russia | 17.32 | 18.23 | | 18.23 | Q |
| 4 | Yevgeniya Kolodko | Russia | 18.05 | | | 18.05 | Q |
| 5 | Chiara Rosa | Italy | 17.37 | 17.34 | 17.87 | 17.87 | q |
| 6 | Josephine Terlecki | Germany | 17.66 | x | 17.81 | 17.81 | q |
| 7 | Anca Heltne | Romania | 17.09 | 17.56 | 17.75 | 17.75 | q |
| 8 | Úrsula Ruiz | Spain | x | 17.18 | 17.46 | 17.46 | q |
| 9 | Helena Engman | Sweden | 17.34 | 16.93 | 17.06 | 17.34 | SB |
| 10 | Radoslava Mavrodieva | Bulgaria | 17.32 | 17.23 | x | 17.32 | SB |
| 11 | Shanice Craft | Germany | 15.73 | 17.30 | x | 17.30 | |
| 12 | Anita Márton | Hungary | 16.99 | 16.76 | 17.22 | 17.22 | |
| 13 | Halyna Obleshchuk | Ukraine | 16.03 | 16.81 | x | 16.81 | |
| 14 | Mariam Kevkhishvili | Georgia | 16.66 | x | x | 16.66 | SB |
| 15 | Catarina Andersson | Sweden | x | 16.38 | 15.75 | 16.38 | |
| 16 | Julaika Nicoletti | Italy | 16.28 | x | x | 16.28 | |

=== Final ===
The final was held at 11:10.

| Rank | Athlete | Nationality | #1 | #2 | #3 | #4 | #5 | #6 | Result | Note |
|---|---|---|---|---|---|---|---|---|---|---|
| 1st place, gold medalist(s) | Christina Schwanitz | Germany | x | 18.21 | 18.47 | x | 18.64 | 19.25 | 19.25 | |
| DQ | Yevgeniya Kolodko | Russia | x | 18.08 | 18.71 | x | 19.04 | x | 19.04 | |
| 2nd place, silver medalist(s) | Alena Kopets | Belarus | 18.53 | 18.14 | x | 18.59 | 18.85 | x | 18.85 | |
| 3rd place, bronze medalist(s) | Chiara Rosa | Italy | 18.37 | 18.10 | 18.12 | x | 18.35 | x | 18.37 | SB |
| 5 | Irina Tarasova | Russia | 18.09 | 17.97 | x | x | 18.31 | 17.98 | 18.31 | SB |
| 6 | Josephine Terlecki | Germany | 17.20 | 17.33 | 18.04 | 17.61 | 18.16 | 17.68 | 18.16 | SB |
| 7 | Anca Heltne | Romania | 17.64 | 17.21 | 17.53 | 17.51 | x | 17.45 | 17.64 | |
| 8 | Úrsula Ruiz | Spain | 16.98 | x | 16.60 | 16.62 | x | 17.22 | 17.22 | |
