= Sandra Lemos =

Colombian shot putter

Personal information
- Full name: Sandra Milena Lemos Rivas
- Born: 1 January 1989 (age 37) Pradera, Valle del Cauca, Colombia
- Height: 1.70 m (5 ft 7 in)
- Weight: 102 kg (225 lb)

Sport
- Country: Colombia
- Sport: Athletics
- Event: Shot put
- Updated on 9 January 2015

Sandra Milena Lemos Rivas (born 1 January 1989) is a Colombian athlete. Her last name is commonly spelled Lemus. She competed for Colombia in shot put at the 2012 Summer Olympics failing to reach the final.

== Personal life ==
She is the sister of decathlete José Lemos, and mother of three children from the relation with judoka Luis Salazar.

== Personal bests ==
- Shot put: 18.03 m – Uberlândia, Brazil, 16 May 2013
- Discus throw: 52.90 m – San Germán, Puerto Rico, 18 February 2012

== Competition record ==
Year	Competition	Venue	Position	Notes
Representing Colombia
2008	World Junior Championships	Bydgoszcz, Poland	6th	15.92 m
2011	South American Championships	Buenos Aires, Argentina	6th	15.38 m
2011	Central American and Caribbean Championships	Mayagüez, Puerto Rico	4th	15.59 m
2012	Ibero-American Championships	Barquisimeto, Venezuela	4th	17.47 m
2012	Olympic Games	London, United Kingdom	27th (q)	16.50 m
2013	South American Championships	Cartagena, Colombia	2nd	17.72 m
2013	World Championships	Moscow, Russia	17th (q)	17.55 m
2013	Bolivarian Games	Trujillo, Peru	2nd	17.45 m
2014	South American Games	Santiago, Chile	3rd	17.20 m
2014	Ibero-American Championships	São Paulo, Brazil	2nd	17.10 m
2014	Central American and Caribbean Games	Xalapa, Mexico	3rd	17.50 m A
2015	South American Championships	Lima, Peru	4th	17.01 m
2016	Ibero-American Championships	Rio de Janeiro, Brazil	4th	17.29 m
2016	Olympic Games	Rio de Janeiro, Brazil	31st (q)	16.46 m
2017	South American Championships	Asunción, Paraguay	2nd	17.30 m
2017	World Championships	London, United Kingdom	27th (q)	16.36 m
2017	Bolivarian Games	Santa Marta, Colombia	2nd	17.87 m
2021	South American Championships	Guayaquil, Ecuador	5th	16.01 m
2022	Bolivarian Games	Valledupar, Colombia	5th	15.16 m
2023	South American Championships	São Paulo, Brazil	5th	16.54 m
