= Yaniuvis López =

Cuban shot putter

Personal information
- Born: 1 February 1986 (age 40)
- Height: 1.80 m (5 ft 11 in)
- Weight: 71 kg (157 lb)

Sport
- Sport: Track and field
- Event: Shot put

Yaniuvis López Sago (born 1 February 1986) is a Cuban athlete whose specialty is the shot put. She represented her country at four World Championships, in 2009, 2013, 2015 and 2017 without qualifying for the final on any occasion. In addition, she has won multiple medals on regional level.

In early 2010, López was diagnosed with acute leukemia. She, however, made a full recovery and returned to competition in 2012.

Her personal best in the event is 18.92 metres set in Havana in 2017.

== Competition record ==
Year	Competition	Venue	Position	Event	Notes
Representing Cuba
2003	World Youth Championships	Sherbrooke, Canada	7th	Shot put	14.41 m
2006	NACAC U23 Championships	Santo Domingo, Dominican Republic	4th	Shot put	15.09 m
2008	Central American and Caribbean Championships	Cali, Colombia	3rd	Shot put	17.87 m
2009	Central American and Caribbean Championships	Havana, Cuba	2nd	Shot put	18.81 m
2009	World Championships	Berlin, Germany	18th (q)	Shot put	17.71 m
2013	World Championships	Moscow, Russia	25th (q)	Shot put	16.82 m
2014	Pan American Sports Festival	Mexico City, Mexico	1st	Shot put	17.96 m
2014	Central American and Caribbean Games	Xalapa, Mexico	2nd	Shot put	17.88 m
2015	Pan American Games	Toronto, Canada	4th	Shot put	17.78 m
2015	NACAC Championships	San José, Costa Rica	3rd	Shot put	16.76 m
2015	World Championships	Beijing, China	17th (q)	Shot put	17.10 m
2016	Olympic Games	Rio de Janeiro, Brazil	22nd (q)	Shot put	17.15 m
2017	World Championships	London, United Kingdom	8th	Shot put	18.03 m
2018	World Indoor Championships	Birmingham, United Kingdom	7th	Shot put	18.19 m
2018	Central American and Caribbean Games	Barranquilla, Colombia	2nd	Shot put	18.03 m
2019	Pan American Games	Lima, Peru	5th	Shot put	17.99 m
