= Christina Schwanitz =

German shot putter

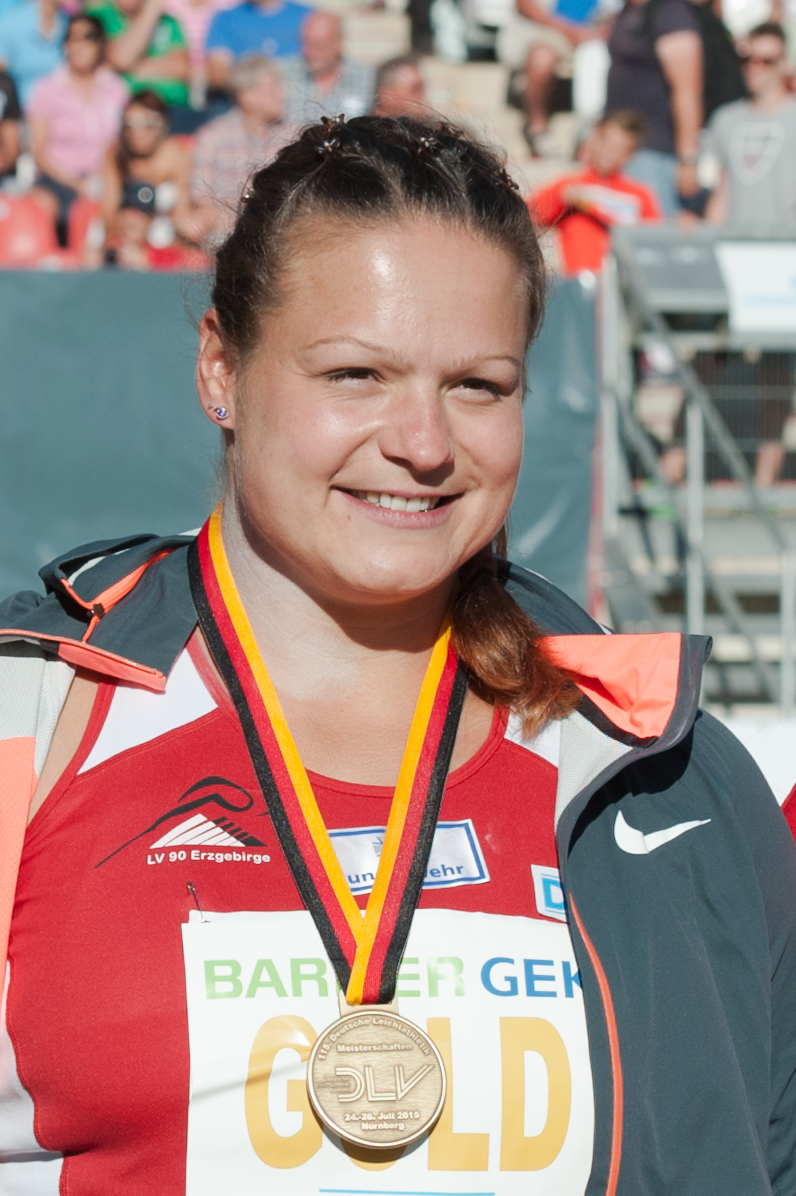

Personal information
- Nationality: German
- Born: 24 December 1985 (age 40) Dresden, East Germany
- Height: 1.80 m (5 ft 11 in)
- Weight: 115 kg (254 lb)

Sport
- Country: Germany
- Sport: Athletics
- Event: Shot put

Achievements and titles
- Personal bests: Outdoor: 20.77 (2015); Indoor: 20.05 (2014)
Medal record
World Championships
Gold medal – first place	2015 Beijing	Shot put
Silver medal – second place	2013 Moscow	Shot put
Bronze medal – third place	2019 Doha	Shot put
World Indoor Championships
Silver medal – second place	2014 Sopot	Shot put
European Championships
Gold medal – first place	2014 Zurich	Shot put
Gold medal – first place	2016 Amsterdam	Shot put
Silver medal – second place	2018 Berlin	Shot put
European Indoor Championships
Gold medal – first place	2013 Gothenburg	Shot put
Silver medal – second place	2011 Paris	Shot put
Silver medal – second place	2019 Glasgow	Shot put
Bronze medal – third place	2021 Toruń	Shot put
European U23 Championships
Silver medal – second place	2005 Erfurt	Shot put
World Junior Championships
Bronze medal – third place	2004 Grosseto	Shot put

Christina Schwanitz (German pronunciation: [kʁɪsˈtiːna ˈʃvaːnɪt͡s]; born 24 December 1985) is a German retired shot putter. Her personal best is 20.77 metres, achieved on 20 May 2015 at World Challenge meeting in Beijing. She has 20.05 m on the indoor track, achieved on 2 February 2014 in Rochlitz.

== Achievements ==
Year	Competition	Venue	Position	Event	Notes
Representing Germany
2004	World Junior Championships	Grosseto, Italy	3rd	Shot put	16.52 m
2005	European U23 Championships	Erfurt, Germany	2nd	Shot put	18.64 m
2005	World Championships	Helsinki, Finland	7th	Shot put	18.02 m
2008	World Indoor Championships	Valencia, Spain	6th	Shot put	18.55 m
2008	Olympic Games	Beijing, China	11th	Shot put	18.27 m
2009	World Championships	Daegu, South Korea	12th	Shot put	17.84 m
2011	European Indoor Championships	Paris, France	2nd	Shot put	18.65 m
2011	World Championships	Daegu, South Korea	12th	Shot put	17.96 m
2012	World Indoor Championships	Istanbul, Turkey	10th (q)	Shot put	17.58 m
2012	European Championships	Helsinki, Finland	5th	Shot put	18.25 m
2012	Olympic Games	London, United Kingdom	10th	Shot put	18.47 m
2013	European Indoor Championships	Gothenburg, Sweden	1st	Shot put	19.25 m
2013	World Championships	Moscow, Russia	2nd	Shot put	20.41 m
2014	World Indoor Championships	Sopot, Poland	2nd	Shot put	19.94 m
2014	European Championships	Zurich, Switzerland	1st	Shot put	19.90 m
2015	World Championships	Beijing, China	1st	Shot put	20.37 m
2016	European Championships	Amsterdam, Netherlands	1st	Shot put	20.17 m
2016	Olympic Games	Rio de Janeiro, Brazil	6th	Shot put	19.03 m
2018	European Championships	Berlin, Germany	2nd	Shot put	19.19 m
2019	European Indoor Championships	Glasgow, United Kingdom	2nd	Shot put	19.11 m
2019	World Championships	Doha, Qatar	3rd	Shot put	19.17 m
2021	European Indoor Championships	Toruń, Poland	3rd	Shot put	19.04 m
2021	Olympic Games	Tokyo, Japan	14th (q)	Shot put	18.08 m

Awards
Preceded by Maria Höfl-Riesch	German Sportswoman of the Year; 2015	Succeeded by Angelique Kerber
