= Athletics at the 2011 Summer Universiade – Women's shot put =

The women's shot put event at the 2011 Summer Universiade was held on 20 August.

== Results ==
Rank	Athlete	Nationality	#1	#2	#3	#4	#5	#6	Result	Notes
1st place, gold medalist(s)	Irina Tarasova	Russia	18.02	17.66	17.86	17.66	17.81	17.42	18.02	
2nd place, silver medalist(s)	Sophie Kleeberg	Germany	x	x	16.63	17.39	17.41	17.48	17.48	
3rd place, bronze medalist(s)	Meng Qianqian	China	16.20	17.21	17.15	16.76	17.20	x	17.21	
4	Yevgeniya Solovyova	Russia	16.50	16.92	17.12	17.19	x	17.15	17.19	
5	Alena Kopets	Belarus	x	16.31	16.31	16.03	x	17.07	17.07	
6	Úrsula Ruiz	Spain	16.50	16.17	17.02	16.31	x	x	17.02	
7	Anita Márton	Hungary	16.76	16.99	16.86	17.01	x	x	17.01	
8	Simoné du Toit	South Africa	15.53	16.22	16.28	16.78	16.29	x	16.78	SB
9	Taryn Suttie	Canada	14.63	x	15.30				15.30	
10	Linda Triel	Estonia	13.39	13.68	13.26				13.68	
	Janneth Acan	Uganda							DNS	
	Liu Xiangrong	China							DNS	
	Nina Otto	Denmark							DNS	
