= Irina Tarasova =

Russian shot putter (born 1987)

Personal information
- Born: 15 April 1987 (age 39)
- Height: 1.79 m (5 ft 10 1/2 in)
- Weight: 115 kg (254 lb)

Sport
- Country: Russia
- Sport: Athletics
- Event: Shot Put
- Updated on 6 August 2012

Irina Ivanovna Tarasova (Russian: Ирина Ивановна Тарасова; born 15 April 1987, Kovrov) is a Russian shot putter.

Tarasova's results from the 2012 Olympic Games, where she originally finished ninth, were annulled for doping violation by the Athletics Integrity Unit in August 2022. All results from 4 July 2012 to 12 July 2016, were cancelled. This also included stripping of the gold (2015) and silver (2014) medals that she won at the European team championships.

== International competitions ==
Representing Russia
Year	Competition	Venue	Position	Event	Result	Notes
2003	European Youth Olympics	Paris, France	1st	Shot put	14.92 m	
2004	World Junior Championships	Grosseto, Italy	5th	Shot put	16.16 m	
2005	European Junior Championships	Kaunas, Lithuania	2nd	Shot put	16.53 m	
2006	World Junior Championships	Beijing, China	3rd	Shot put	17.11 m	
2007	European U23 Championships	Debrecen, Hungary	1st	Shot put	18.26 m	
2007	Universiade	Bangkok, Thailand	1st	Shot put	17.46 m	
2009	European U23 Championships	Kaunas, Lithuania	2nd	Shot put	17.90 m	
2011	European Indoor Championships	Paris, France	8th	Shot put	17.17 m	
2011	Universiade	Shenzhen, China	1st	Shot put	18.02 m	
2012	World Indoor Championships	Istanbul, Turkey	8th	Shot put	18.54 m	
2012	European Championships	Helsinki, Finland	2nd	Shot put	18.91 m	
2012	Olympic Games	London, United Kingdom	DQ (Doping); ~~7th~~	Shot put	19.00 m	
2013	European Indoor Championships	Gothenburg, Sweden	DQ (Doping); ~~5th~~	Shot put	18.31 m	
2013	Universiade	Kazan, Russia	DQ (Doping); ~~1st~~	Shot put	18.75 m	
2013	World Championships	Moscow, Russia	DQ (Doping); ~~7th~~	Shot put	18.37 m	
2014	World Indoor Championships	Sopot, Poland	DQ (Doping); ~~9th (q)~~	Shot put	18.11 m	
2014	European Championships	Zürich, Switzerland	DQ (Doping); ~~6th~~	Shot put	18.05 m	

== See also ==
- List of European Athletics Championships medalists (women)
