= 2011 European Athletics U23 Championships – Women's shot put =

Shot put event

The women's shot put event at the 2011 European Athletics U23 Championships was held in Ostrava, Czech Republic, at Městský stadion on 15 July.

== Medalists ==
Gold	Yevgeniya Kolodko; Russia
Silver	Sophie Kleeberg; Germany
Bronze	Melissa Boekelman; Netherlands

== Results ==
=== Final ===
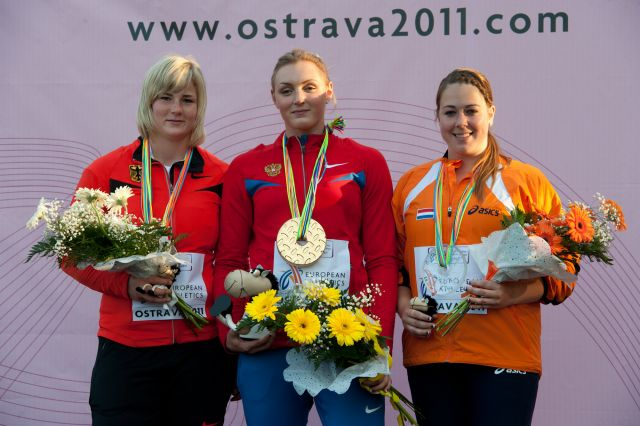
The medalists

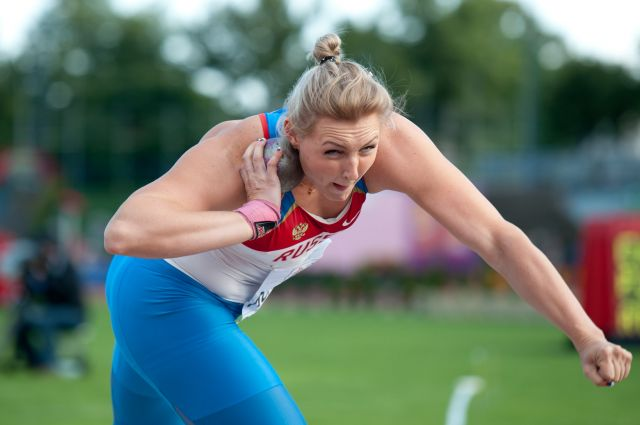
Yevgeniya Kolodko in action

15 July 2011 / 17:35

Rank	Name	Nationality	Attempts						Result	Notes
Rank	Name	Nationality	1	2	3	4	5	6	Result	Notes
1st place, gold medalist(s)	Yevgeniya Kolodko	Russia	17.10	18.22	17.83	x	18.84	18.87	18.87	
2nd place, silver medalist(s)	Sophie Kleeberg	Germany	16.48	17.92	x	x	17.19	17.33	17.92	PB
3rd place, bronze medalist(s)	Melissa Boekelman	Netherlands	x	17.26	17.62	x	x	17.88	17.88	
4	Paulina Guba	Poland	17.17	x	16.73	x	x	x	17.17	PB
5	Anita Márton	Hungary	16.42	16.92	17.09	16.65	16.85	16.99	17.09	
6	Halyna Obleshchuk	Ukraine	15.71	16.65	16.73	x	16.87	16.85	16.87	
7	Olesya Sviridova	Russia	x	16.12	16.74	x	16.24	16.81	16.81	
8	Samira Burkhardt	Germany	16.29	16.31	x	16.38	x	16.28	16.38	
9	Magdalena Żebrowska	Poland	14.57	14.58	15.09				15.09	
10	Fabienne Ngoma	France	14.17	14.09	x				14.17	
11	Trine Mulbjerg	Denmark	x	14.05	x				14.05	
12	Ana Zogović	Switzerland	x	13.29	x				13.29	

=== Qualifications ===
Qualified: qualifying perf. 15.50 (Q) or 12 best performers (q) to the advance to the Final

==== Summary ====
Rank	Name	Nationality	Result	Notes
1	Sophie Kleeberg	Germany	17.39	Q
2	Yevgeniya Kolodko	Russia	16.97	Q
2	Anita Márton	Hungary	16.97	Q
4	Halyna Obleshchuk	Ukraine	16.88	Q
5	Paulina Guba	Poland	16.42	Q
6	Melissa Boekelman	Netherlands	16.11	Q
7	Olesya Sviridova	Russia	15.91	Q
8	Samira Burkhardt	Germany	15.60	Q
9	Magdalena Żebrowska	Poland	15.49	q
10	Trine Mulbjerg	Denmark	15.46	q NR
11	Fabienne Ngoma	France	14.68	q
12	Ana Zogović	Switzerland	14.63	q
13	Pamela Kiel	Netherlands	14.59	
14	Anastasia Muchkaev	Israel	14.53	
15	Markéta Červenková	Czech Republic	14.51	
16	Helena Perez	France	14.23	
17	Katja Kantanen	Finland	14.23	
18	Nazaret Viesca	Spain	14.15	
19	Špela Hus	Slovenia	14.04	
20	Ivana Krištofíčová	Slovakia	14.02	
21	Linda Treiel	Estonia	13.93	
22	Ioana Alexandra Iancu	Romania	13.93	
23	Frida Åkerström	Sweden	13.55	

==== Details ====
===== Group A =====
15 July 2011 / 10:00

Rank	Name	Nationality	Attempts			Result	Notes
Rank	Name	Nationality	1	2	3	Result	Notes
1	Halyna Obleshchuk	Ukraine	16.88			16.88	Q
2	Melissa Boekelman	Netherlands	16.11			16.11	Q
3	Olesya Sviridova	Russia	15.91			15.91	Q
4	Samira Burkhardt	Germany	15.60			15.60	Q
5	Magdalena Żebrowska	Poland	14.96	15.15	15.49	15.49	q
6	Fabienne Ngoma	France	14.23	14.68	x	14.68	q
7	Anastasia Muchkaev	Israel	14.53	x	x	14.53	
8	Katja Kantanen	Finland	14.23	x	x	14.23	
9	Nazaret Viesca	Spain	13.99	14.15	x	14.15	
10	Špela Hus	Slovenia	x	14.03	14.04	14.04	
11	Ioana Alexandra Iancu	Romania	13.93	x	x	13.93	
12	Frida Åkerström	Sweden	x	12.72	13.55	13.55	

===== Group B =====
15 July 2011 / 10:00

Rank	Name	Nationality	Attempts			Result	Notes
Rank	Name	Nationality	1	2	3	Result	Notes
1	Sophie Kleeberg	Germany	17.39			17.39	Q
2	Yevgeniya Kolodko	Russia	16.97			16.97	Q
2	Anita Márton	Hungary	16.97			16.97	Q
4	Paulina Guba	Poland	16.42			16.42	Q
5	Trine Mulbjerg	Denmark	14.57	14.76	15.46	15.46	q NR
6	Ana Zogović	Switzerland	14.59	14.61	14.63	14.63	q
7	Pamela Kiel	Netherlands	14.53	x	14.59	14.59	
8	Markéta Červenková	Czech Republic	14.40	14.42	14.51	14.51	
9	Helena Perez	France	14.23	x	13.92	14.23	
10	Ivana Krištofíčová	Slovakia	x	14.02	13.44	14.02	
11	Linda Treiel	Estonia	11.62	13.83	13.93	13.93	

== Participation ==
According to an unofficial count, 23 athletes from 18 countries participated in the event.

- Czech Republic (1)
- Denmark (1)
- Estonia (1)
- Finland (1)
- France (2)
- Germany (2)
- Hungary (1)
- Israel (1)
- Netherlands (2)
- Poland (2)
- Romania (1)
- Russia (2)
- Slovakia (1)
- Slovenia (1)
- Spain (1)
- Sweden (1)
- Switzerland (1)
- Ukraine (1)
