= Athletics at the 2007 All-Africa Games – Women's shot put =

The women's shot put at the 2007 All-Africa Games was held on July 22.

== Results ==
Rank	Athlete	Nationality	Result	Notes
1st place, gold medalist(s)	Vivian Chukwuemeka	Nigeria	17.60	
2nd place, silver medalist(s)	Simoné du Toit	South Africa	16.77	
3rd place, bronze medalist(s)	Veronica Abrahamse	South Africa	15.75	
4	Monique Ngo Ngoué	Cameroon	15.18	
5	Mariam Nnodo Ibekne	Nigeria	15.06	
6	Wafaa Baghdadi	Egypt	14.65	
7	Coulibaly Nakani	Mali	12.35	
