= Natalia Duco =

Chilean shot putter (born 1989)

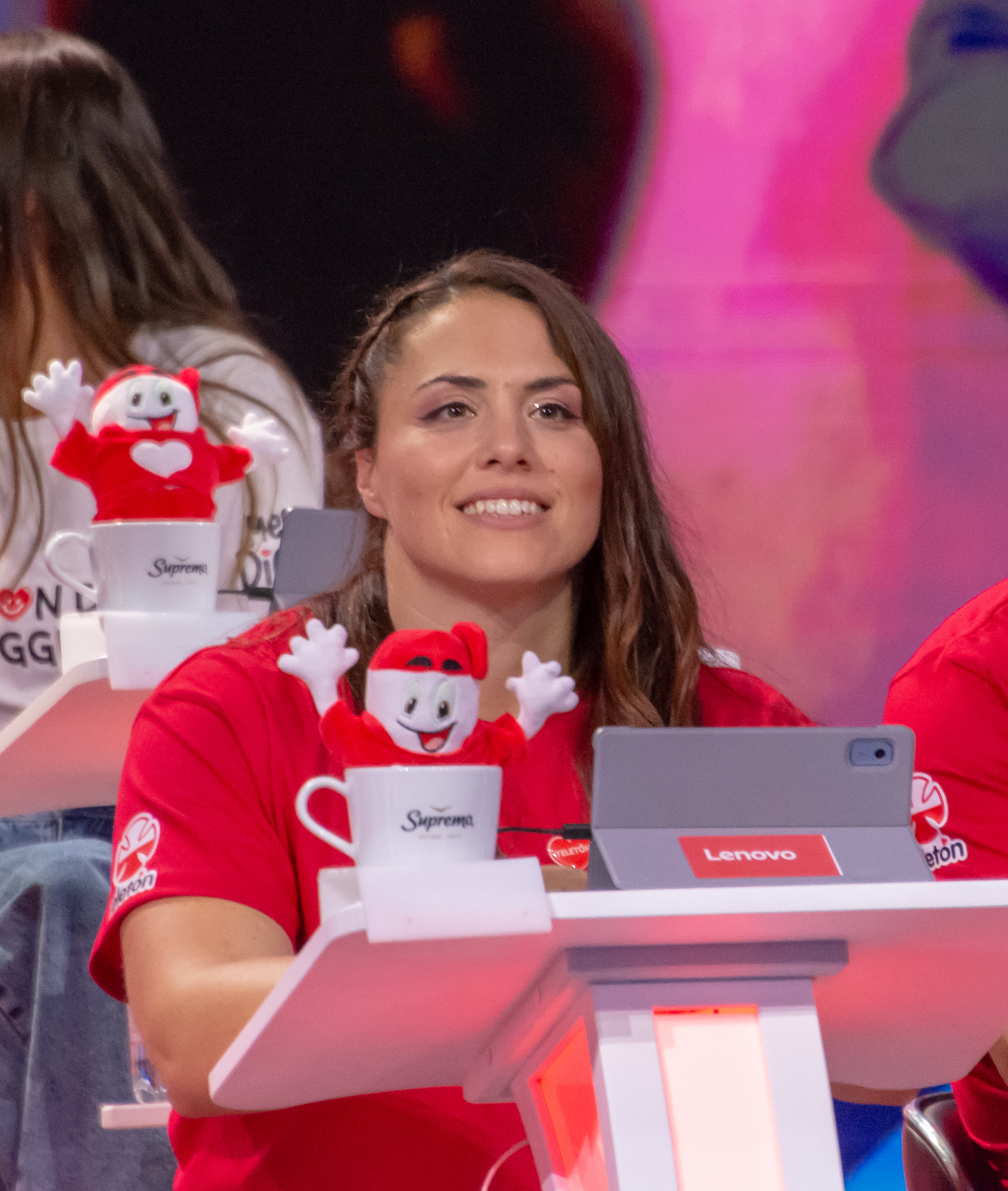
- Natalia Duco in 2023

Minister of Sports
- In office 11 March 2026 – 14 August 2026
- President: José Antonio Kast
- Preceded by: Jaime Pizarro
- Succeeded by: Francisco Riveros

Personal details
- Born: 31 January 1989 (age 37) San Felipe, Valparaíso, Chile
- Party: Independent
- Sports career
- Education: Gabriela Mistral University
- Height: 1.77 m (5 ft 10 in)
- Weight: 99 kg (218 lb)
- Country: Chile
- Sport: Athletics
- Event: Shot Put
Medal record
Women's athletics
Pan American Games
Bronze medal – third place	2015 Toronto	Shot put
South American Games
Gold medal – first place	2014 Santiago	Shot put
South American Championships
Gold medal – first place	2009 Lima	Shot put
Gold medal – first place	2011 Buenos Aires	Shot put
Bronze medal – third place	2023 São Paulo	Shot put
Bronze medal – third place	2007 São Paulo	Shot put
Ibero-American Championships
Gold medal – first place	2008 Iquique	Shot put
Gold medal – first place	2014 São Paulo	Shot put
Silver medal – second place	2010 San Fernando	Shot put
Silver medal – second place	2012 Barquisimeto	Shot put
- Updated on 16 June 2024

Natalia Duco Soler (born 31 January 1989) is a Chilean shot putter.

Duco finished fourth at the 2005 World Youth Championships, twelfth at the 2006 World Junior Championships and won the gold medal at the 2008 World Junior Championships. She also competed at the 2008 Olympic Games without reaching the final round.

Duco's personal best throw (and Chilean national record) is 18.80 metres, achieved in August 2012 at the London Olympics, where she qualified for the final, placing seventh.

She also reached the final of the 2016 Olympic Games.

In 2018 she was suspended for four years for consuming a banned substance, GHRP-6. She returned to competition in 2022.

== Personal bests ==
- Shot put: 18.80 m – London, United Kingdom, 6 August 2012

== Achievements ==
Year	Competition	Venue	Position	Event	Notes
Representing Chile
2004	South American Youth Championships	Guayaquil, Ecuador	2nd	Shot put	12.64 m
2005	World Youth Championships	Marrakesh, Morocco	4th	Shot put	14.44 m
2005	Pan American Junior Championships	Windsor, Canada	7th	Shot put	13.79 m
2005	South American Junior Championships	Rosario, Argentina	1st	Shot put	13.57 m
2006	World Junior Championships	Beijing, China	12th	Shot put	14.38 m
2006	South American Youth Championships	Caracas, Venezuela	1st	Shot put	15.67 m
2006	South American Youth Championships	Caracas, Venezuela	1st	Discus throw	39.31 m
2006	South American U23 Championships	Buenos Aires, Argentina	1st	Shot put	16.36 m (AYR, NJR)
2007	ALBA Games	Caracas, Venezuela	3rd	Shot put	16.59 m
2007	South American Championships	São Paulo, Brazil	3rd	Shot put	16.20 m
2007	South American Junior Championships	São Paulo, Brazil	1st	Shot put	16.67 m
2007	Pan American Junior Championships	São Paulo, Brazil	1st	Shot put	16.40 m
2007	Pan American Games	Rio de Janeiro, Brazil	7th	Shot put	16.92 m (PB)
2008	Ibero-American Championships	Iquique, Chile	1st	Shot put	18.65 m (AJR, NR)
2008	World Junior Championships	Bydgoszcz, Poland	1st	Shot put	17.23 m
2008	Olympic Games	Beijing, China	22nd (q)	Shot put	17.40 m
2008	South American U23 Championships	Lima, Peru	1st	Shot put	17.77 m A
2009	ALBA Games	Havana, Cuba	4th	Shot put	17.84 m
2009	South American Championships	Lima, Peru	1st	Shot put	17.73 m
2009	World Championships	Berlin, Germany	19th (q)	Shot put	17.61 m
2010	South American Under-23 Championships	Medellín, Colombia	1st	Shot put	17.71 m A
2010	Ibero-American Championships	San Fernando, Spain	2nd	Shot put	17.10 m
2011	South American Championships	Buenos Aires, Argentina	1st	Shot put	17.15 m
2011	World Championships	Daegu, South Korea	20th (q)	Shot put	17.42 m
2011	Pan American Games	Guadalajara, Mexico	5th	Shot put	17.56 m
2012	Ibero-American Championships	Barquisimeto, Venezuela	2nd	Shot put	18.46 m
2012	Olympic Games	London, United Kingdom	7th	Shot put	18.80 m (NR)
2013	Universiade	Kazan, Russia	3rd	Shot put	17.96 m
2013	World Championships	Moscow, Russia	11th	Shot put	18.02 m
2014	World Indoor Championships	Sopot, Poland	13th (q)	Shot put	17.24 m
2014	South American Games	Santiago, Chile	1st	Shot put	18.07 m
2014	Ibero-American Championships	São Paulo, Brazil	1st	Shot put	17.53 m
2014	Pan American Sports Festival	Mexico City, Mexico	2nd	Shot put	17.88m A
2015	South American Championships	Lima, Peru	2nd	Shot put	17.56 m
2015	Pan American Games	Toronto, Canada	3rd	Shot put	18.01 m
2015	World Championships	Beijing, China	9th	Shot put	17.98 m
2016	Ibero-American Championships	Rio de Janeiro, Brazil	3rd	Shot put	17.45 m
2016	Olympic Games	Rio de Janeiro, Brazil	10th	Shot put	18.07 m
2017	World Championships	London, United Kingdom	15th (q)	Shot put	17.66 m
2017	Universiade	Taipei, Taiwan	4th	Shot put	17.73 m
2017	Bolivarian Games	Santa Marta, Colombia	1st	Shot put	17.99 m
2018	South American Games	Cochabamba, Bolivia	–	Shot put	DQ
2022	Bolivarian Games	Valledupar, Colombia	2nd	Shot put	16.75 m
2022	South American Games	Asunción, Paraguay	1st	Shot put	17.08 m
2023	South American Championships	São Paulo, Brazil	3rd	Shot put	16.93 m
2023	Pan American Games	Santiago, Chile	7th	Shot put	16.58 m
2024	South American Indoor Championships	Cochabamba, Bolivia	2nd	Shot put	16.63 m
2024	Ibero-American Championships	Cuiabá, Brazil	4th	Shot put	16.74 m
2024	Olympic Games	Paris, France	30th (q)	Shot put	16.11 m
