= Melissa Boekelman =

Dutch athlete (born 1989)

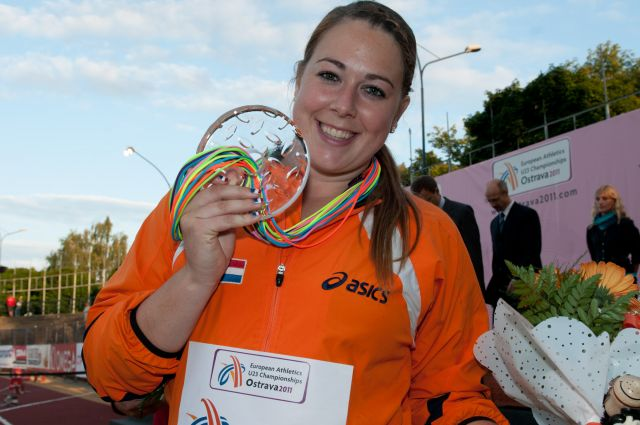
Melissa Boekelman at the 2011 European Athletics U23 Championships in Ostrava

Melissa Boekelman (born 11 May 1989 in Dordrecht) is a Dutch shot putter and bobsledder.

She made her bobsleigh debut in a Europa Cup meeting at Königssee in December 2013, finishing 7th. In January 2014 she made her first appearance at a Bobsleigh World Cup event at St. Moritz, finishing 11th.

Her personal bests in the shot put are 18.36 metres outdoors (Burcht 2016) and 18.02 metres indoors (Apeldoorn 2010).

== International competitions ==
Year	Competition	Venue	Position	Event	Notes
Representing the Netherlands
2006	World Junior Championships	Beijing, China	1st	Shot put	17.66 m
2006	World Junior Championships	Beijing, China	–	Discus throw	NM
2007	European Junior Championships	Hengelo, Netherlands	1st	Shot put	16.51 m
2007	European Junior Championships	Hengelo, Netherlands	7th	Discus throw	48.03 m
2008	World Junior Championships	Bydgoszcz, Poland	2nd	Shot put	16.60 m
2008	World Junior Championships	Bydgoszcz, Poland	–	Discus throw	NM
2009	European U23 Championships	Kaunas, Lithuania	4th	Shot put	17.37 m
2009	European U23 Championships	Kaunas, Lithuania	13th (q)	Javelin	51.80 m
2010	World Indoor Championships	Doha, Qatar	14th (q)	Shot put	17.57 m
2010	European Championships	Barcelona, Spain	14th	Shot put	17.32 m
2011	European U23 Championships	Ostrava, Czech Republic	3rd	Shot put	17.88 m
2014	European Championships	Zürich, Switzerland	12th	Shot put	16.98 m
2016	European Championships	Amsterdam, Netherlands	8th	Shot put	17.92 m
2016	Olympic Games	Rio de Janeiro, Brazil	15th (q)	Shot put	17.69 m
2017	European Indoor Championships	Belgrade, Serbia	12th (q)	Shot put	17.19 m
2017	World Championships	London, United Kingdom	11th	Shot put	17.73 m
2018	European Championships	Berlin, Germany	14th (q)	Shot put	16.90 m
