= 2011 European Athletics Indoor Championships – Women's shot put =

The Women's shot put event at the 2011 European Athletics Indoor Championships was held on March 4–5, 2011 with the final being held on March 5 at 14:20 local time.

== Records ==
Standing records prior to the 2011 European Athletics Indoor Championships
World record	Helena Fibingerová (TCH)	22.50	Jablonec, Czechoslovakia	19 February 1977
European record	Helena Fibingerová (TCH)	22.50	Jablonec, Czechoslovakia	19 February 1977
Championship record	Helena Fibingerová (TCH)	21.46	San Sebastián, Spain	13 March 1977
World Leading	Jillian Camarena-Williams (USA)	19.87	Albuquerque, United States	27 February 2011
European Leading	Christina Schwanitz (GER)	18.87	Leipzig, Germany	26 February 2011

== Results ==
=== Qualification ===
Qualification: Qualification Performance 17.90 (Q) or at least 8 best performers advanced to the final. It was held at 15:50.

Rank	Athlete	Nationality	#1	#2	#3	Result	Note
1	Christina Schwanitz	Germany	18.39			18.39	Q
2	Anita Márton	Hungary	17.54	18.11		18.11	Q
3	Josephine Terlecki	Germany	18.01			18.01	Q
4	Anna Avdeyeva	Russia	17.97			17.97	Q
5	Chiara Rosa	Italy	17.16	17.83	X	17.83	q
6	Irina Tarasova	Russia	17.17	17.35	16.59	17.35	q
7	Jessica Cérival	France	16.38	17.26	17.05	17.26	q
8	Sophie Kleeberg	Germany	X	17.25	X	17.25	q
9	Alena Kopets	Belarus	X	17.11	17.05	17.11	
10	Vera Yepimashka	Belarus	15.00	16.89	X	16.89	
11	Halyna Obleshchuk	Ukraine	15.07	16.21	X	16.21	
12	Radoslava Mavrodieva	Bulgaria	X	15.02	15.24	15.24	

=== Final ===
The final was held at 14:20.

Rank	Athlete	Nationality	#1	#2	#3	#4	#5	#6	Result	Note
1st place, gold medalist(s)	Anna Avdeyeva	Russia	X	18.70	18.52	X	18.43	X	18.70	SB
2nd place, silver medalist(s)	Christina Schwanitz	Germany	X	18.48	18.65	18.38	X	18.46	18.65	
3rd place, bronze medalist(s)	Josephine Terlecki	Germany	18.09	17.95	17.86	17.47	17.57	17.89	18.09	PB
4	Jessica Cérival	France	17.84	17.04	X	17.46	X	17.82	17.84	
5	Anita Márton	Hungary	17.66	17.23	17.74	17.35	17.84	17.28	17.84	
6	Sophie Kleeberg	Germany	17.00	17.37	X	X	17.24	17.63	17.63	PB
7	Chiara Rosa	Italy	17.45	17.54	X	X	X	X	17.54	
8	Irina Tarasova	Russia	16.87	16.48	16.41	17.17	16.84	16.48	17.17	
