= 2014 IAAF World Indoor Championships – Women's shot put =

The women's Shot Put at the 2014 IAAF World Indoor Championships took place on 8 March 2014.

== Medalists ==
Gold	Silver	Bronze
Valerie Adams; New Zealand	Christina Schwanitz; Germany	Gong Lijiao; China

== Records ==
Standing records prior to the 2014 IAAF World Indoor Championships
World record	Helena Fibingerová (TCH)	22.50	Jablonec, Czechoslovakia	19 February 1977
Championship record	Nadzeya Ostapchuk (BLR)	20.85	Doha, Qatar	14 March 2010
World Leading	Christina Schwanitz (GER)	20.05	Rochlitz, Germany	2 February 2014
African record	Vivian Chukwuemeka (NGR)	18.13	Flagstaff, United States	4 February 2006
Asian record	Sui Xinmei (CHN)	21.10	Beijing, China	3 March 1990
European record	Helena Fibingerová (TCH)	22.50	Jablonec, Czechoslovakia	19 February 1977
North and Central American and Caribbean record	Jillian Camarena-Williams (USA)	19.89	Fayetteville, United States	11 February 2012
Oceanian Record	Valerie Vili (NZL)	20.98	Zürich, Germany	28 August 2013
South American record	Elisângela Adriano (BRA)	18.33	Piraeus, Greece	24 February 1999
Records broken during the 2014 IAAF World Indoor Championships
World Leading	Valerie Adams (NZL)	20.11	Sopot, Poland	8 March 2014
World Leading	Valerie Adams (NZL)	20.67	Sopot, Poland	8 March 2014

== Qualification standards ==
Indoor	Outdoor
17.80

== Schedule ==
Date	Time	Round
March 8, 2014	10:15	Qualification
March 8, 2014	18:50	Final

== Results ==
=== Qualification ===
Qualification: 18.70 (Q) or at least 8 best performers (q) qualified for the final.

Rank	Athlete	Nationality	#1	#2	#3	Result	Notes
1	Valerie Adams	New Zealand	20.11			20.11	Q, WL
2	Christina Schwanitz	Germany	18.58	19.73		19.73	Q
3	Yuliya Leantsiuk	Belarus	18.85			18.85	Q, SB
4	Michelle Carter	United States	18.79			18.79	Q, SB
5	Anita Márton	Hungary	17.69	18.37	18.63	18.63	q, PB
6	Gong Lijiao	China	18.55	18.59	18.60	18.60	q, SB
DQ	Yevgeniya Kolodko	Russia	~~18.32~~	x	x	~~18.32~~	q, Doping
7	Jeneva McCall	United States	x	17.95	18.20	18.20	q
8	Irina Tarasova	Russia	18.11	17.81	18.07	18.11	
9	Alena Kopets	Belarus	17.73	x	x	17.73	
DQ	Anca Heltne	Romania	x	~~17.35~~	x	~~17.35~~	
10	Chiara Rosa	Italy	17.31	x	17.05	17.31	
11	Natalia Ducó	Chile	17.07	16.99	17.24	17.24	NR
12	Úrsula Ruiz	Spain	17.16	17.08	x	17.16	
13	Josephine Terlecki	Germany	16.76	16.94	17.11	17.11	
14	Olha Holodna	Ukraine	17.11	x	x	17.11	
15	Halyna Obleshchuk	Ukraine	x	16.74	16.36	16.74	
16	Radoslava Mavrodieva	Bulgaria	x	16.37	16.48	16.48	
17	Lin Chia-ying	Chinese Taipei	15.87	x	16.31	16.31	

=== Final ===
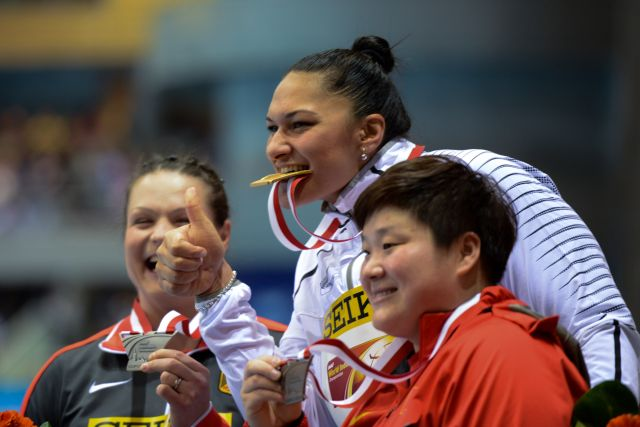
The medalists (left to right): Christina Schwanitz, Valerie Adams, Gong Lijiao

Rank	Athlete	Nationality	#1	#2	#3	#4	#5	#6	Result	Notes
1st place, gold medalist(s)	Valerie Adams	New Zealand	20.06	20.41	x	20.10	20.67	20.16	20.67	WL
2nd place, silver medalist(s)	Christina Schwanitz	Germany	19.69	x	19.54	19.36	19.94	19.51	19.94	
3rd place, bronze medalist(s)	Gong Lijiao	China	18.96	18.89	19.07	19.24	18.72	19.19	19.24	SB
DQ	Yevgeniya Kolodko	Russia	x	~~18.18~~	~~18.88~~	~~18.66~~	x	~~19.11~~	~~19.11~~	~~SB~~, Doping
4	Michelle Carter	United States	x	19.10	x	18.63	18.64	x	19.10	SB
5	Anita Márton	Hungary	18.17	17.73	18.06	17.99	x	18.05	18.17	
6	Yuliya Leantsiuk	Belarus	x	18.02	18.16	17.98	x	x	18.16	
7	Jeneva McCall	United States	18.05	17.76	17.67	17.52	17.56	x	18.05	
