= 2006 World Junior Championships in Athletics – Women's discus throw =

The women's discus throw event at the 2006 World Junior Championships in Athletics was held in Beijing, China, at Chaoyang Sports Centre on 18 and 20 August.

== Medalists ==
Gold	Dani Samuels; Australia
Silver	Pan Saili; China
Bronze	Tan Jian; China

== Results ==
=== Final ===
20 August

Rank	Name	Nationality	Attempts						Result	Notes
Rank	Name	Nationality	1	2	3	4	5	6	Result	Notes
1st place, gold medalist(s)	Dani Samuels	Australia	60.22	58.99	60.63	51.81	60.32	59.04	60.63	
2nd place, silver medalist(s)	Pan Saili	China	55.32	52.70	54.24	57.40	x	56.21	57.40	
3rd place, bronze medalist(s)	Tan Jian	China	x	54.07	x	56.09	x	54.47	56.09	
4	Annelies Peetroons	Belgium	52.05	51.15	52.10	x	54.42	52.09	54.42	
5	Rocío Comba	Argentina	43.48	46.25	52.42	50.74	x	x	52.42	
6	Simoné du Toit	South Africa	51.00	x	48.62	42.81	52.39	50.50	52.39	
7	Ionela Vartolomei	Romania	49.26	x	49.67	46.03	x	48.98	49.67	
8	Yueh-Ching Chou	Chinese Taipei	x	46.06	49.61	47.04	x	46.85	49.61	
9	Alesia Flaryanovich	Belarus	40.25	47.44	48.64				48.64	
10	Kristina Gehrig	Germany	x	47.81	48.36				48.36	
11	Ivana Banacká	Czech Republic	x	48.18	x				48.18	
12	Anita Márton	Hungary	46.76	42.27	45.06				46.76	

=== Qualifications ===
18 August

==== Group A ====
Rank	Name	Nationality	Attempts			Result	Notes
Rank	Name	Nationality	1	2	3	Result	Notes
1	Dani Samuels	Australia	57.67	-	-	57.67	Q
2	Annelies Peetroons	Belgium	52.01	-	-	52.01	Q
3	Pan Saili	China	x	51.77	-	51.77	Q
4	Simoné du Toit	South Africa	46.92	50.32	-	50.32	Q
5	Anita Márton	Hungary	49.65	-	-	49.65	Q
6	Anna-Katharina Weller	Germany	x	45.95	41.75	45.95	
7	Jere Summers	United States	40.59	x	45.95	45.95	
8	Sakong Ga-Eun	South Korea	45.90	45.18	45.63	45.90	
9	Alena Kopets	Belarus	41.40	44.77	x	44.77	
10	Sandra Perković	Croatia	44.11	42.86	42.64	44.11	
11	Li Wen-Hua	Chinese Taipei	43.33	x	38.92	43.33	
12	Elina Mattila	Finland	42.28	41.76	43.20	43.20	
	Melissa Boekelman	Netherlands	x	x	x	NM	

==== Group B ====
Rank	Name	Nationality	Attempts			Result	Notes
Rank	Name	Nationality	1	2	3	Result	Notes
1	Tan Jian	China	52.04	-	-	52.04	Q
2	Rocío Comba	Argentina	49.31	47.55	49.13	49.31	q
3	Ionela Vartolomei	Romania	45.81	48.38	x	48.38	q
4	Kristina Gehrig	Germany	x	x	48.19	48.19	q
5	Alesia Flaryanovich	Belarus	39.98	47.89	x	47.89	q
6	Yueh-Ching Chou	Chinese Taipei	43.89	46.79	47.47	47.47	q
7	Ivana Banacká	Czech Republic	46.80	42.64	46.08	46.80	q
8	Katalin Császár	Hungary	46.66	46.58	46.21	46.66	
9	Emily Pendleton	United States	38.10	43.38	46.48	46.48	
10	Oksana Kot	Uzbekistan	x	46.22	46.16	46.22	
11	Diana Ozolina	Latvia	40.27	42.36	43.97	43.97	
12	Annabel Thomson	Australia	x	42.32	41.73	42.32	
13	Eléni Diamadí	Greece	41.50	42.04	x	42.04	
	Irais Estrada	Mexico	x	x	x	NM	

== Participation ==
According to an unofficial count, 27 athletes from 20 countries participated in the event.

- Argentina (1)
- Australia (2)
- Belarus (2)
- Belgium (1)
- China (2)
- Chinese Taipei (2)
- Croatia (1)
- Czech Republic (1)
- Finland (1)
- Germany (2)
- Greece (1)
- Hungary (2)
- Latvia (1)
- Mexico (1)
- Netherlands (1)
- Romania (1)
- South Africa (1)
- South Korea (1)
- United States (2)
- Uzbekistan (1)
