= Jeneva Stevens =

American track and field athlete

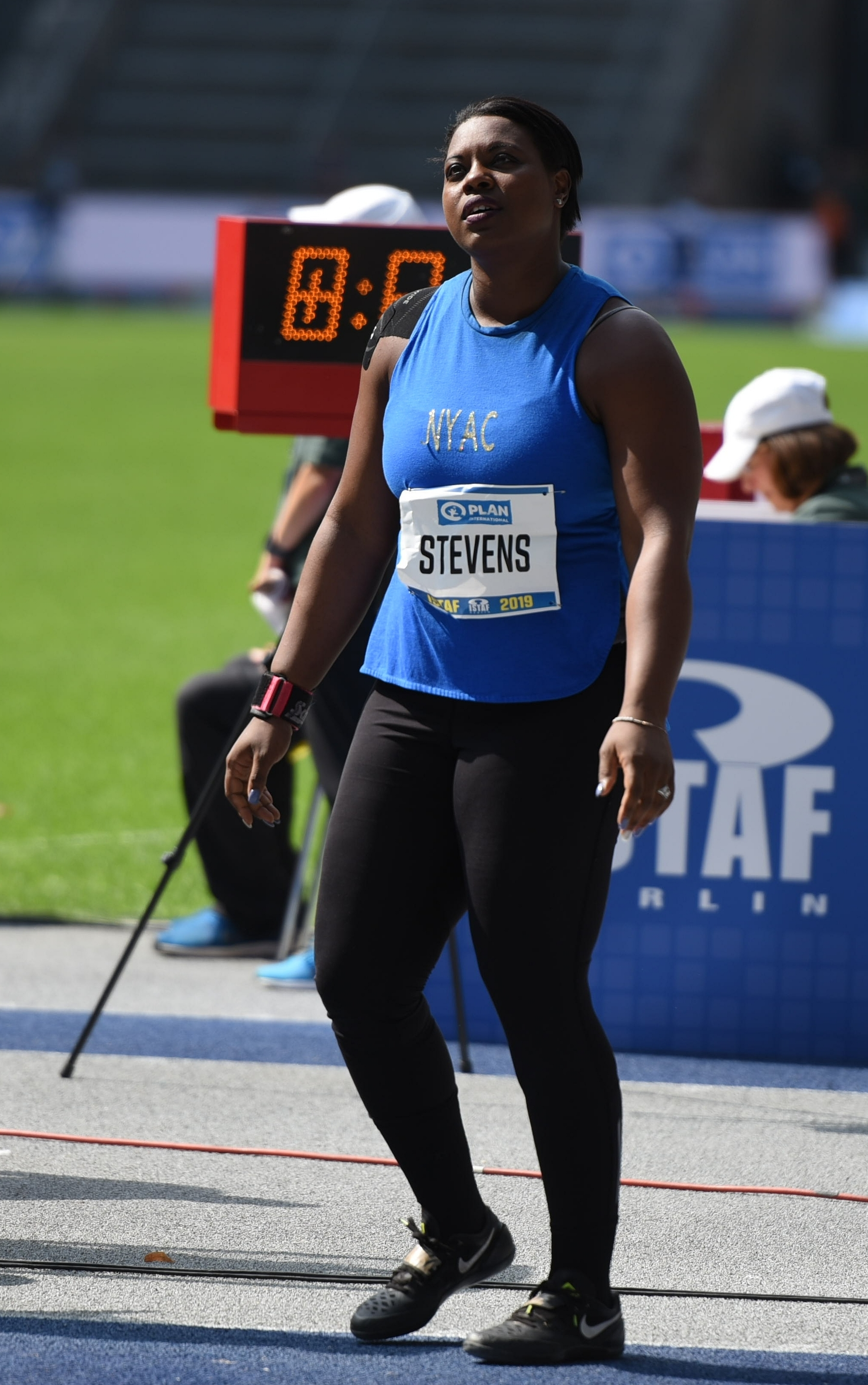
- Jeneva Stevens in 2019

Personal information
- Nationality: USA
- Born: October 28, 1989 (age 36)
- Height: 5 ft 10 in (1.78 m)
- Weight: 225 lb (102 kg) (2013)

Sport
- Sport: Track and field
- Event(s): Hammer throw, Shot put
- College team: Southern Illinois University
- Club: New York Athletic Club
Medal record
Universiade
Gold medal – first place	Kazan 2013	Hammer throw

Jeneva Stevens (née McCall, born October 28, 1989) is an American track and field athlete specializing in the shot put and hammer throw. Her biggest successes to date are the gold medal at the 2013 Summer Universiade in Kazan and 9th place at the 2013 World Championships in Moscow.

Jeneva Stevens is the daughter of former boxing world champion Oliver McCall. She graduated from Southern Illinois University in 2012 with a degree in psychology. She was inducted to the Southern Illinois Hall of Fame in 2018.

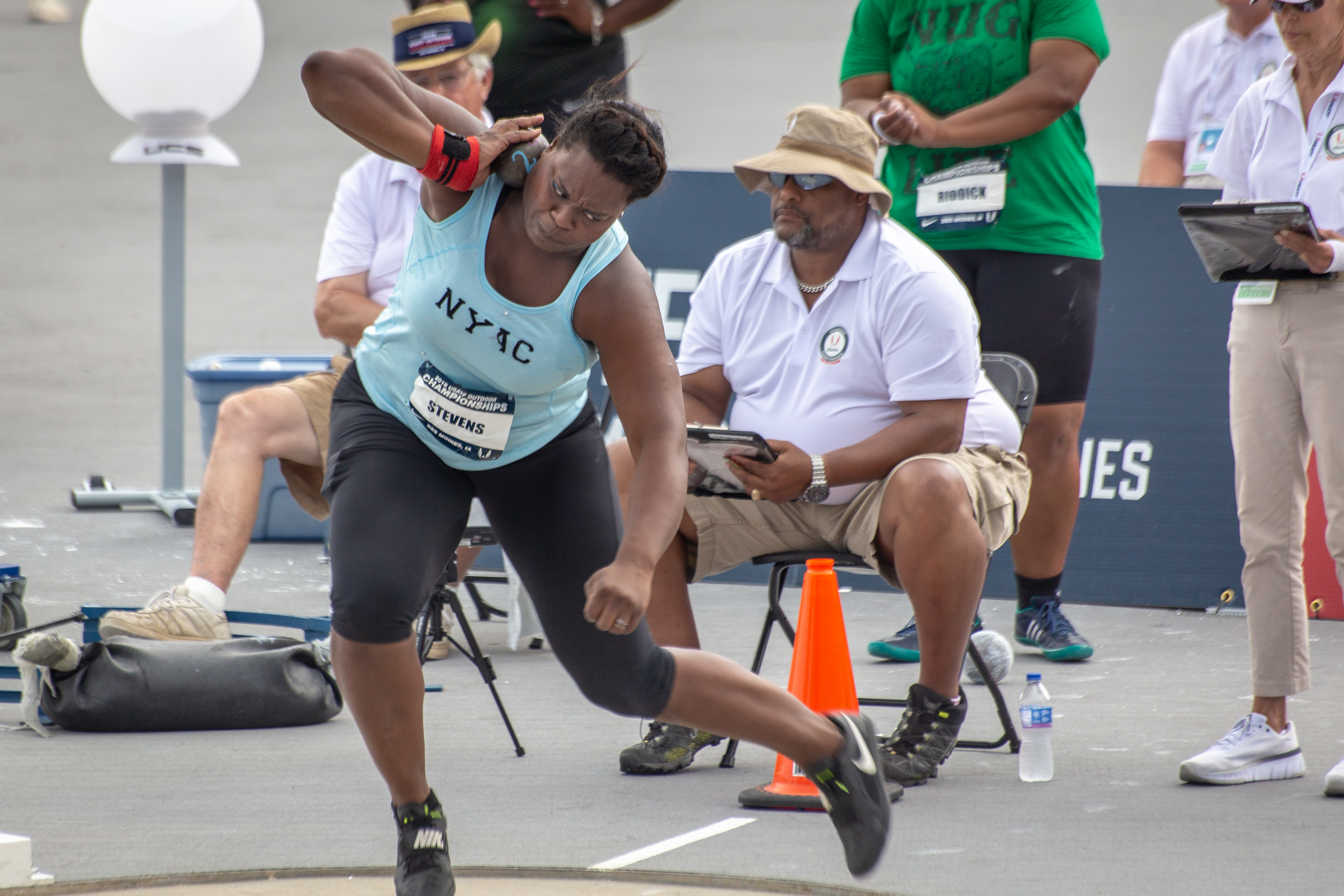
Stevens at the 2018 USA Outdoor Track and Field Championships

== Competition record ==
Year	Competition	Venue	Position	Event	Notes
Representing United States
2010	NACAC U23 Championships	Miramar, Florida, United States	2nd	Discus	56.16m
2010	NACAC U23 Championships	Miramar, Florida, United States	2nd	Hammer	64.17m
2011	World Championships	Daegu, South Korea	15th (q)	Hammer throw	68.26 m
2013	Universiade	Kazan, Russia	8th	Shot put	17.04 m
2013	Universiade	Kazan, Russia	1st	Hammer throw	73.75 m
2013	World Championships	Moscow, Russia	9th	Hammer throw	72.65 m
2014	World Indoor Championships	Sopot, Poland	8th	Shot put	18.05 m
2015	Pan American Games	Toronto, Canada	6th	Shot put	17.63 m
2015	NACAC Championships	San José, Costa Rica	2nd	Shot put	17.61 m
2015	World Championships	Beijing, China	10th	Shot put	17.84 m
2018	World Indoor Championships	Birmingham, United Kingdom	8th	Shot put	18.18 m

== Personal bests ==
Outdoor

- Shot put – 19.11 (Carbondale 2016)
- Discus throw – 59.45 (Auburn, AL 2012)
- Hammer throw – 74.77 (Dubnica 2013)

Indoor

- Shot put – 19.10 (Carbondale, IL 2012)
- Weight throw – 23.98 (Carbondale, IL 2014)
