= Julie Labonté =

Canadian track and field athlete (born 1990)

Personal information
- Born: January 12, 1990 (age 36) Sainte-Justine, Quebec, Canada
- Height: 1.82 m (5 ft 11 1/2 in)
- Weight: 82 kg (181 lb)

Sport
- Country: Canada
- Sport: Athletics
- Event: Shot Put/Discus

Achievements and titles
- Personal bests: Shot Put - 18.31 m Discus - 56.84 m
Medal record
Representing Canada
Women's Shot put
Commonwealth Games
Bronze medal – third place	2014 Glasgow	Shot put

Julie Labonté (born January 12, 1990, in Sainte-Justine, Quebec) is a Canadian track and field athlete competing in shot put and discus.

== Career ==
She finished 10th at the 2007 World Youth Championships in Athletics in Ostrava, Czech Republic, and 14th at the 2008 World Junior Championships in Athletics in Bydgoszcz, Poland. She won the gold medal in the shot put event at the 2008 Commonwealth Youth Games in Pune, India.

She won the 2011 NCAA Division 1 Indoor and Outdoor Championships as a part of the University of Arizona Wildcats. She placed 18th in the shot put at the 2011 World Championships in Athletics in Deagu, South Korea. Her personal best of 18.31 metres, achieved in Des Moines, Iowa, in 2011 currently stands as the Canadian record.

After finishing first in the shot put event 2012 Canadian Track and Field Championships in Calgary, and achieving an Olympic "A" standard during the outdoor season, she qualified to represent Canada at the shot put event at the 2012 Summer Olympics in London, finishing 22nd.

She participated at the 2013 Summer Universiade in Kazan, Russia where she finished 6th.

At the 2014 Commonwealth Games, she won the bronze medal, with a throw of 17.58 m.

== Personal life ==
Labonté was born on January 12, 1990, in Sainte-Justine, Quebec, to parents Daniel Labonté and Celine Tanguay. She graduated from the University of Arizona in 2014 with a degree in family studies and human development.
