= Olha Holodna =

Ukrainian shot putter

Olha Holodna (Ukrainian: Ольга Анатоліївна Голодна; born 14 November 1991 in Mryn, Nosivka Raion) is a Ukrainian shot putter.

== Career ==
In her early career she finished eighth at the 2010 World Junior Championships and won the 2013 European U23 Championships. She later competed at the 2013 World Championships and the 2014 World Indoor Championships without reaching the final, before finishing ninth at the 2016 European Championships.

Her personal best is 18.72 metres, achieved in June 2013 in Kyiv.
