= Aliona Dubitskaya =

Belarusian shot putter (born 1990)

Personal information
- Born: 25 January 1990 (age 36) Bastuny, Voranava District, Belarus
- Height: 1.80 m (5 ft 11 in)
- Weight: 76 kg (168 lb)

Sport
- Country: Belarus
- Sport: Track and field
- Event: Shot put

Achievements and titles
- Personal best: Shot put: 19.03 m (2014)
Medal record
European Championships
Bronze medal – third place	2018 Berlin	Shot put

Aliona Viktarauna Dubitskaya, née Hryshko, (Belarusian: Алёна Віктараўна Дубіцкая; born 25 January 1990) is a Belarusian athlete whose specialty is the shot put. She competed in the shot put event at the 2015 World Championships in Athletics in Beijing, China. In 2014, she tested positive for an illegal stimulant, Oxilofrine, and was banned for six months.
