= 2012 Summer Olympics medal table =

2012 Summer Olympics medals
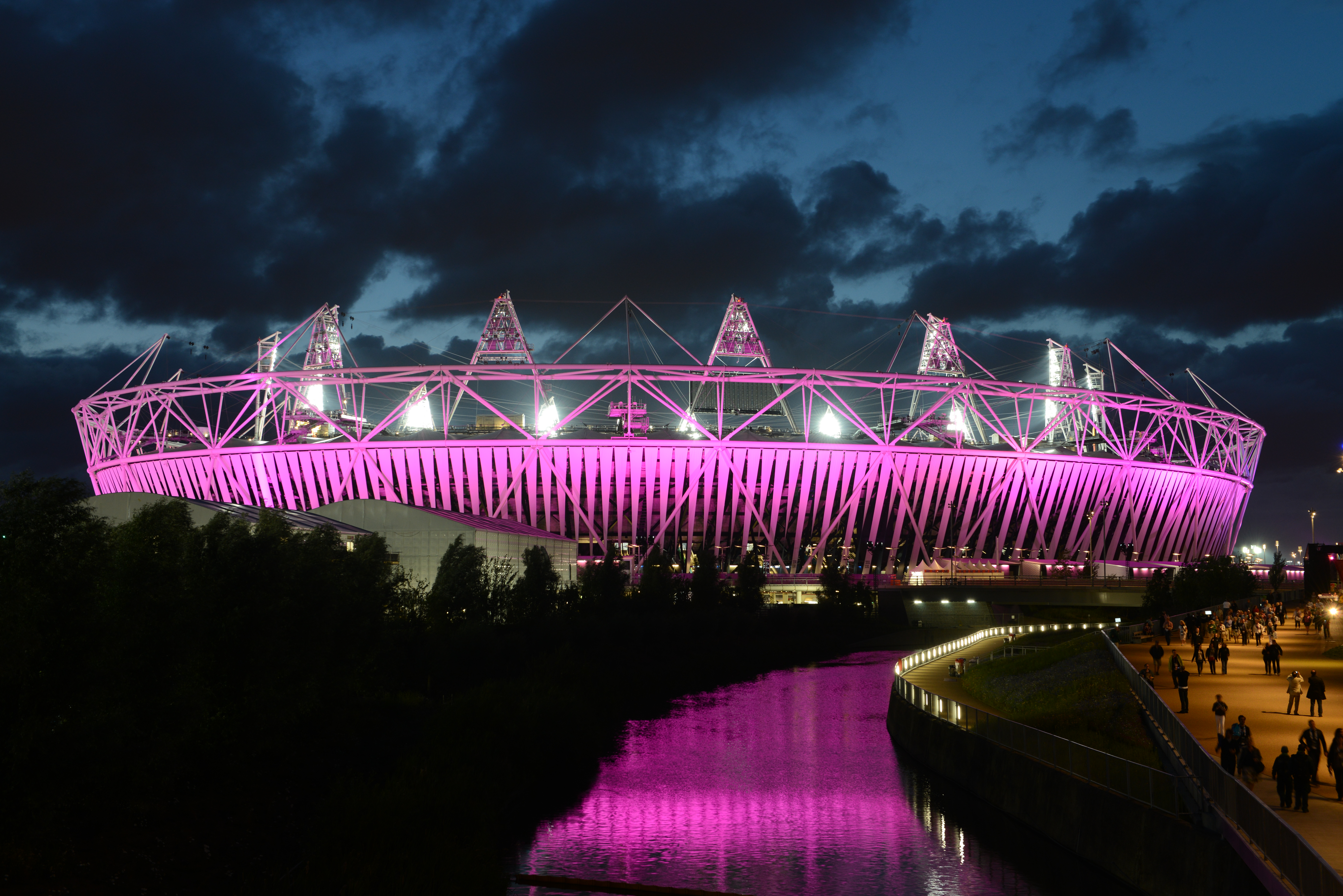
- London Olympic Stadium during the 2012 Summer Olympics
- Location: London, Great Britain

Highlights
- Most gold medals: United States (48)
- Most total medals: United States (106)
- Medalling NOCs: 86

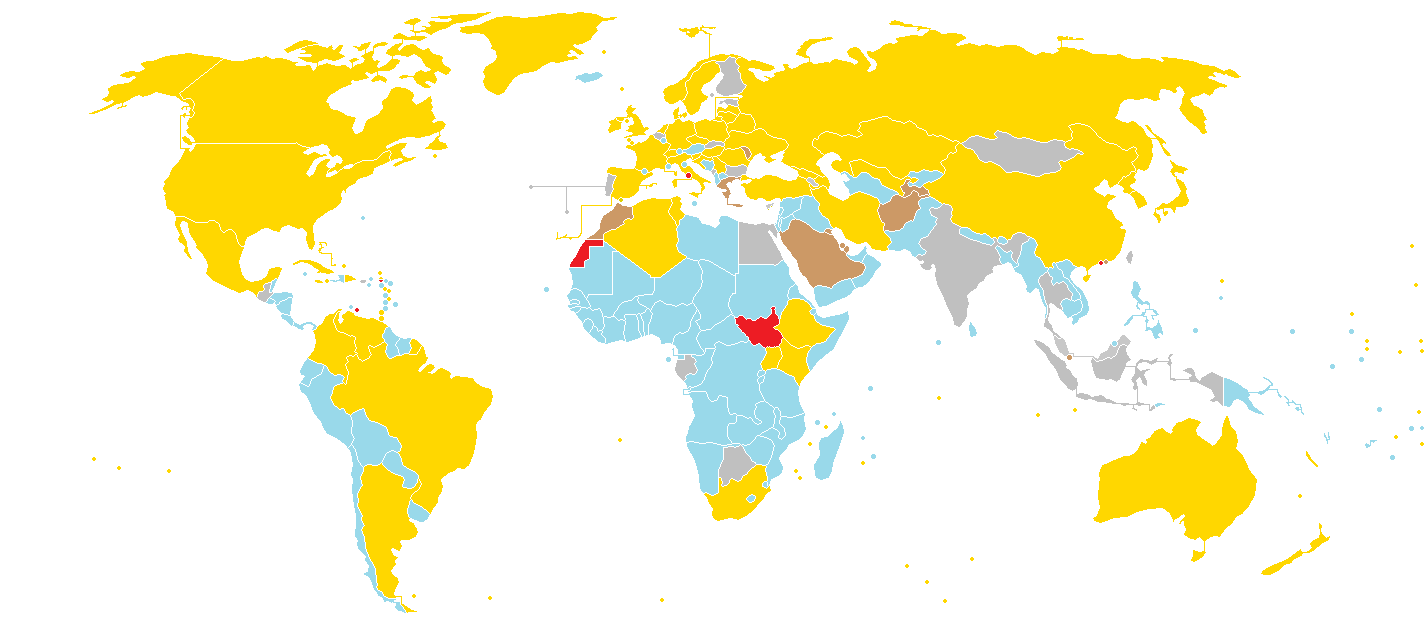
World map showing the medal achievements of each country during the 2012 Summer Olympics Legend: represents countries that won at least one gold medal. represents countries that won at least one silver medal but no gold medals. represents countries that won only at least one bronze medal. represents countries that did not win any medals. represents entities that did not participate in the 2012 Summer Olympics.

The 2012 Summer Olympics, officially known as the Games of the XXX Olympiad, was a summer multi-sport event held in London, the capital of the United Kingdom, from 27 July to 12 August. A total of 10,768 athletes from 204 nations participated in 302 medal events in 26 sports across 39 different disciplines.

Overall, 86 nations received at least one medal, and 55 of them won at least one gold medal. Athletes from the United States won the most medals overall, with 105, and the most gold medals, with 48. (Note: The United States won 46 gold medals at the Games, and later secured two more as a result of doping samples re-analysis and medal re-allocations.) The latter record is the largest gold medal haul for the country at a non-US-hosted Olympics. Host nation Great Britain (Note: The United Kingdom competes under the name Great Britain to include athletes from the Isle of Man, Channel Islands and British Overseas Territories (except Bermuda, British Virgin Islands and Cayman Islands, which all compete separately).) won 29 gold medals and 65 overall medals, making it the most successful Olympics performance for that nation since the 1908 edition.

Michael Phelps and Missy Franklin won the most gold medals at the Games with four each. Phelps also won the highest number of medals overall, winning six in total. Bahrain, (Note: Middle-distance runner Maryam Yusuf Jamal was retroactively awarded a gold medal in 2017 due to doping violations that affected the results of the Women's 1500 metres race. Originally, runner Rashid Ramzi won the Men's 1500 metres race in 2008, but he was stripped of his gold medal the following year after he tested positive for the blood-booster CERA. Furthermore, athlete Ruth Jebet won the women's 3000 metres steeplechase at the 2016 Summer Olympics prior to Jamal receiving the reallocated gold medal the following year.) Botswana, Cyprus, Gabon, Grenada, Guatemala, and Montenegro all won their first Olympic medals, with Bahrain and Grenada as well as Serbia winning their nation's first Olympic gold medal. Previously, Montenegrin athletes had competed as nationals of Serbia and Montenegro and of Yugoslavia. (Note: During the 1992 Summer Olympics, Montenegrin athletes competed as Independent Olympic Participants.) Taekwondo athlete Milica Mandić from Serbia won the first Olympic gold medal as an independent nation.

During and after the Games, many athletes who were caught doping, or tested positive for banned substances, were disqualified from competition and had their medals revoked. To date, 43 medals have been stripped, with Russia accounting for 20 of those.

== Medal table ==
1. Athletics (15.5%)
2. Swimming (11.2%)
3. Gymnastics (5.90%)
4. Cycling (5.90%)
5. Wrestling (5.90%)
6. Canoeing (5.30%)
7. Weightlifting (5.00%)
8. Shooting (5.00%)
9. Judo (4.60%)
10. Rowing (4.60%)
11. Boxing (4.30%)
12. Sailing (3.30%)
13. Fencing (3.30%)
14. Taekwondo (2.60%)
15. Diving (2.60%)
16. Equestrian (2.00%)
17. Badminton (1.70%)
18. Tennis (1.70%)
19. Archery (1.30%)
20. Table tennis (1.30%)
21. Volleyball (1.30%)
22. Basketball (0.70%)
23. Field hockey (0.70%)
24. Football (0.70%)
25. Handball (0.70%)
26. Modern pentathlon (0.70%)
27. Synchronized swimming (0.70%)
28. Triathlon (0.70%)
29. Water polo (0.70%)

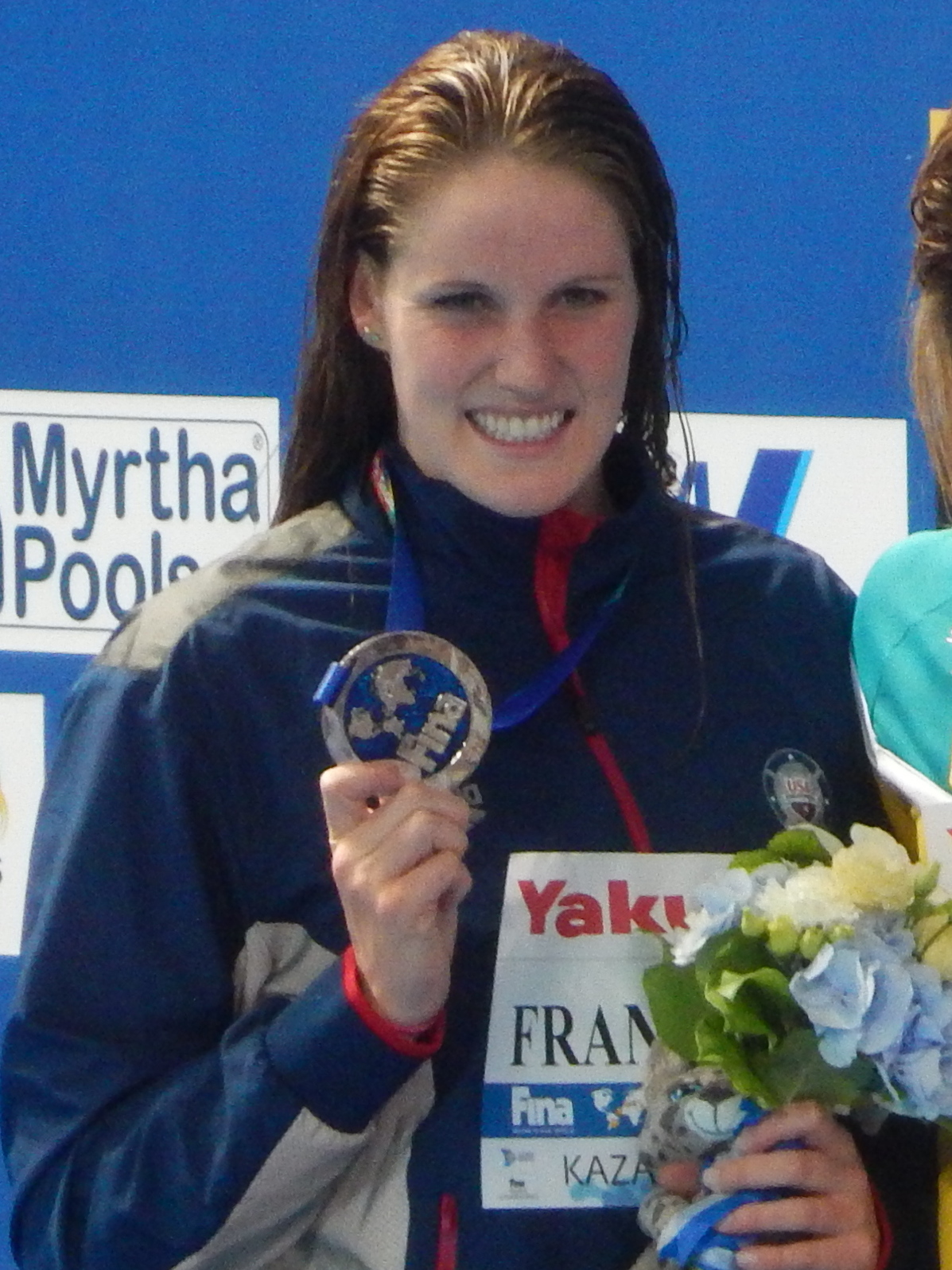
Missy Franklin (pictured) tied with Michael Phelps for most gold medals won at the 2012 Summer Olympics at four apiece. Phelps led the overall medal count with six.

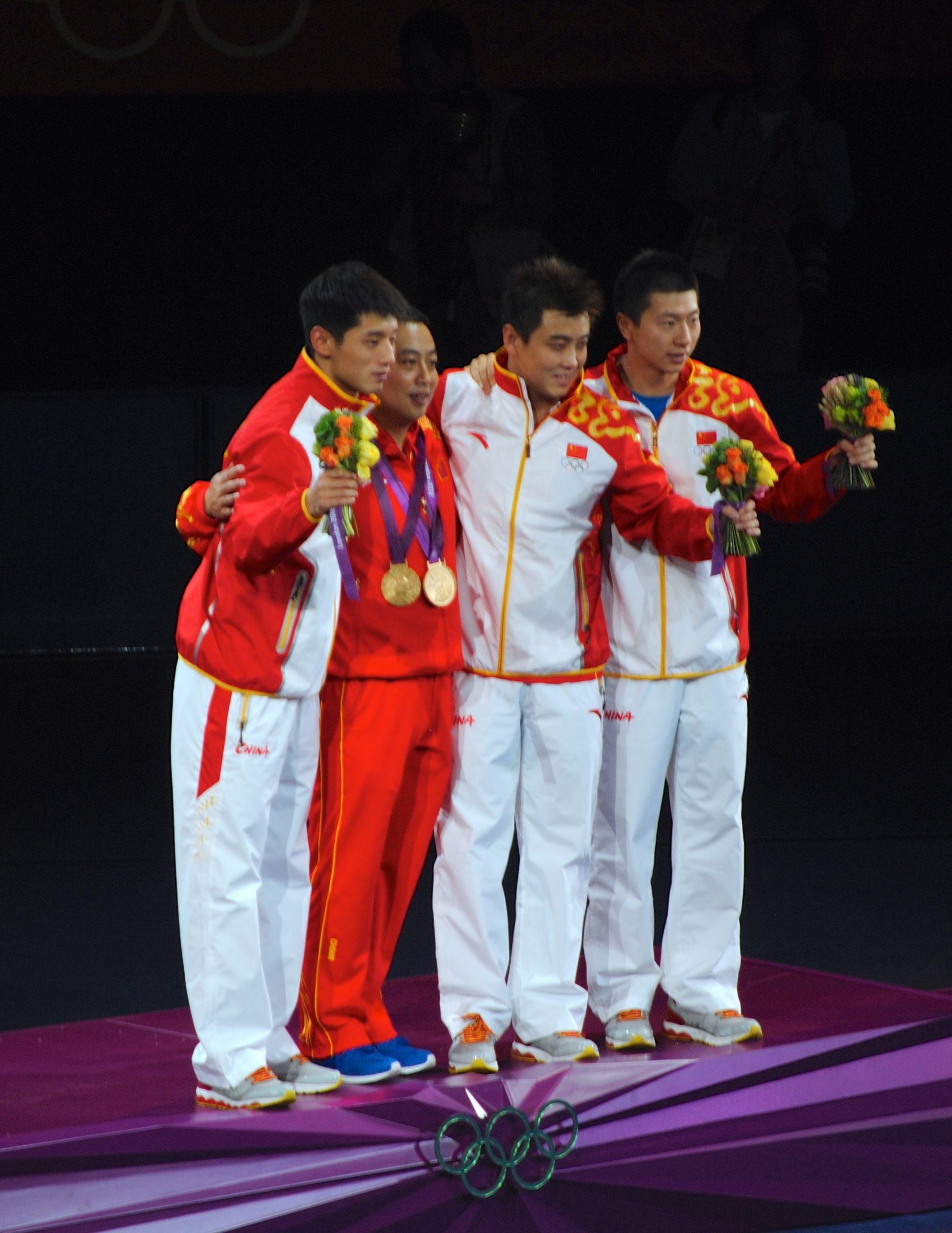
China defended the men's team event title in table tennis.

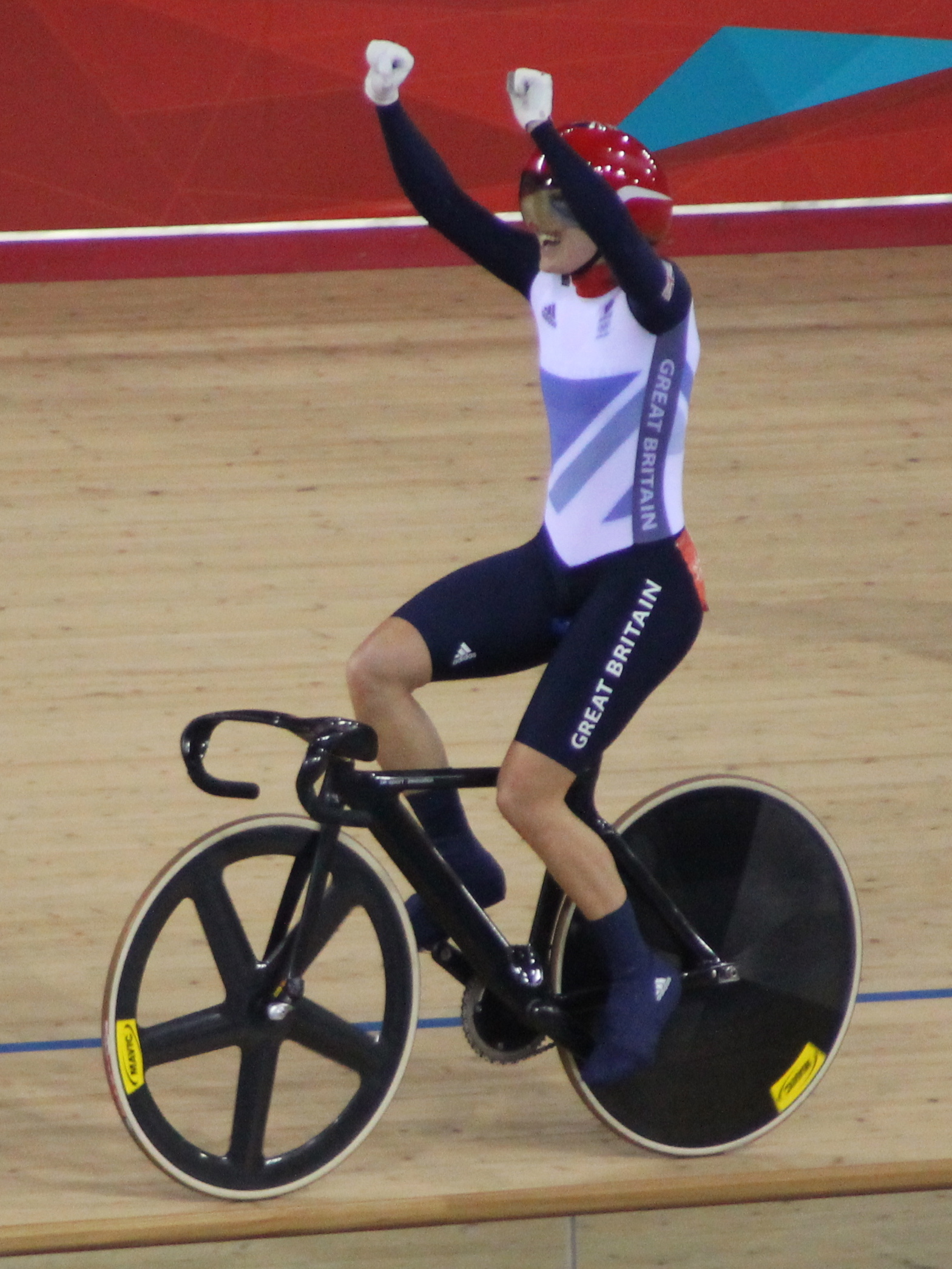
Victoria Pendleton won the first-ever gold medal in the women's Keirin event.

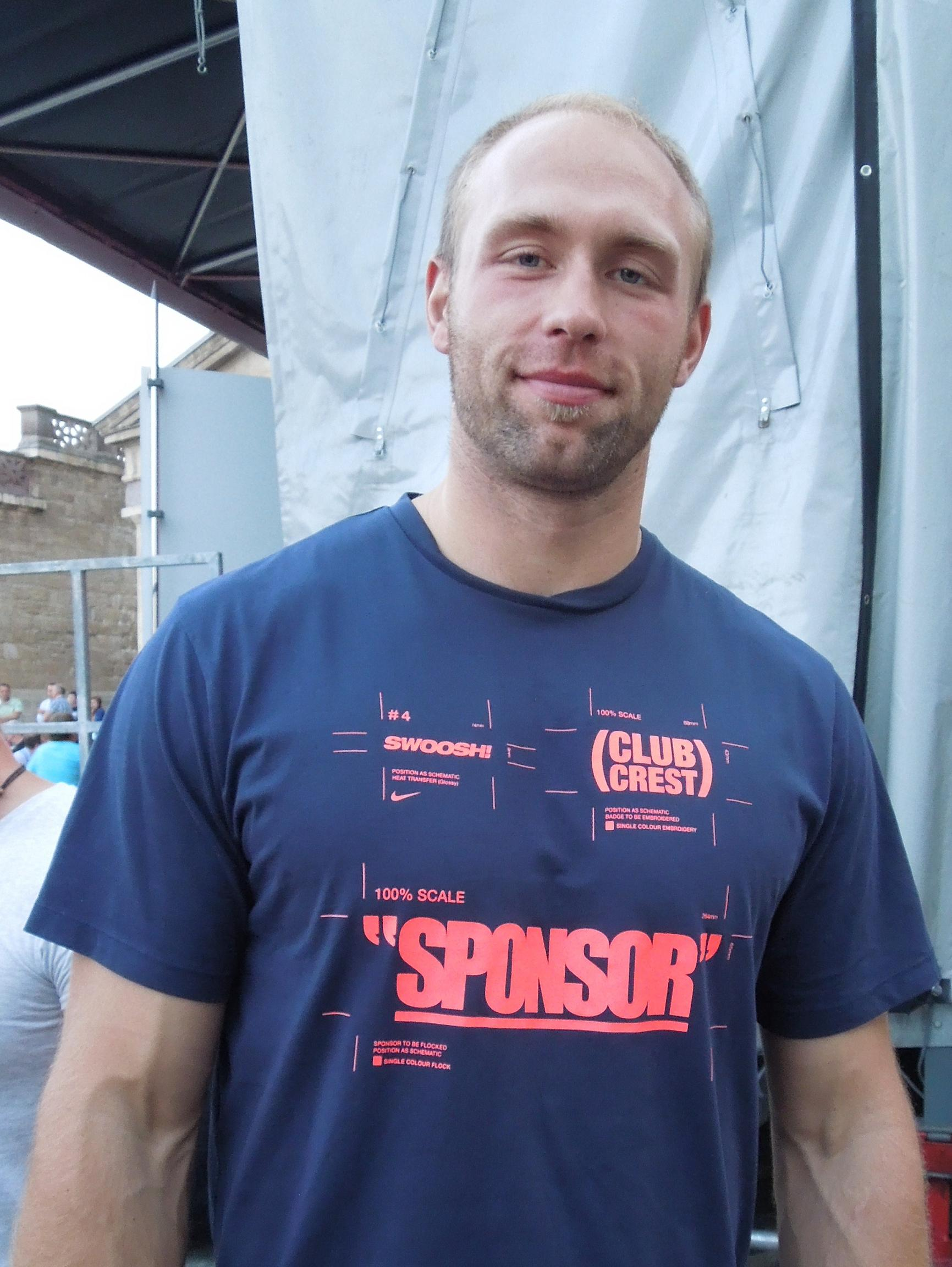
Robert Harting won the gold medal in the men's discus throw event.

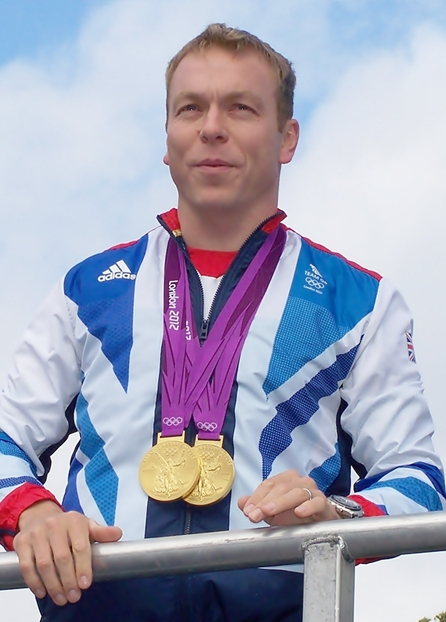
Chris Hoy won gold medals in the men's Keirin and team sprint cycling competitions.

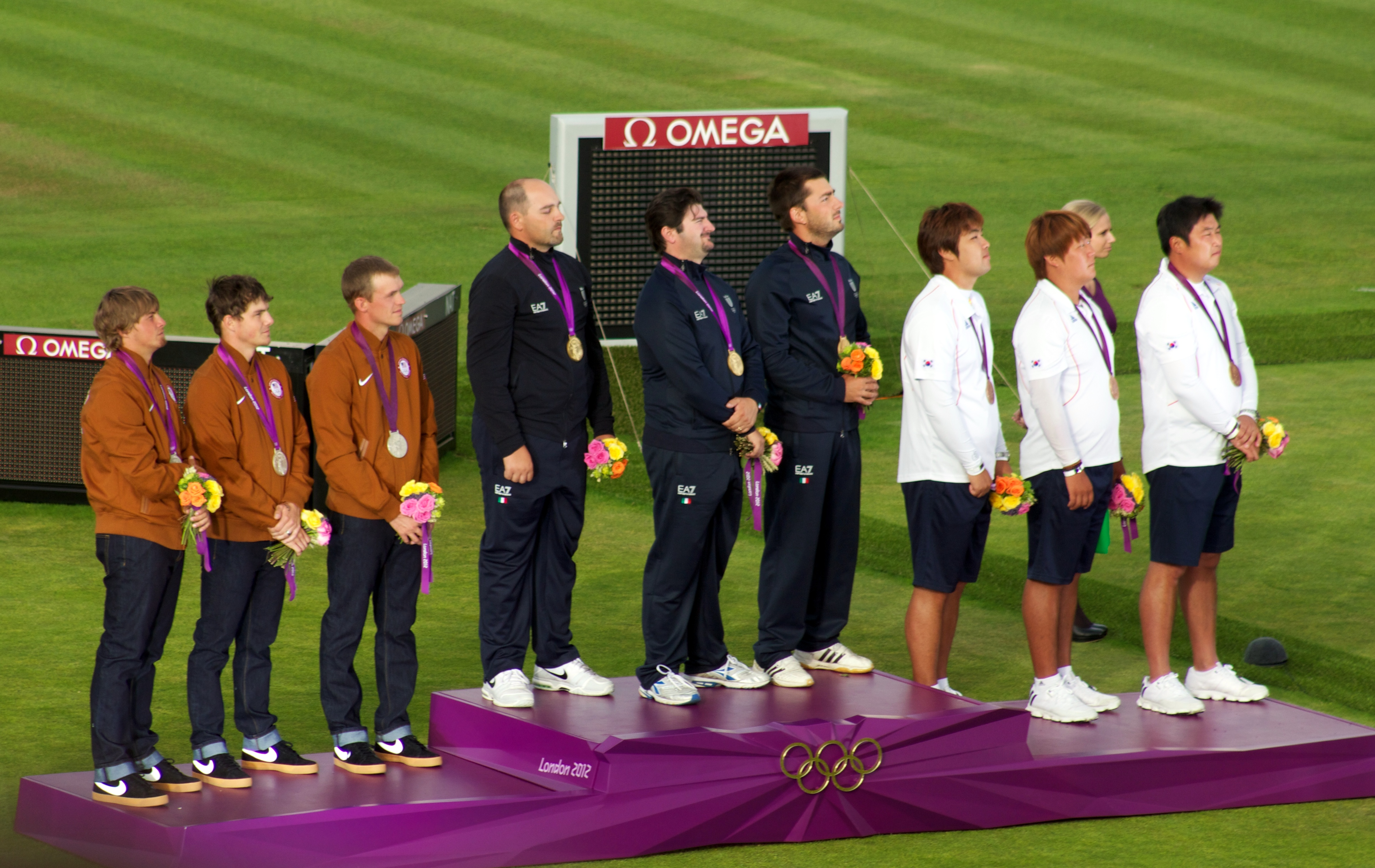
Medallists in the men's archery team event

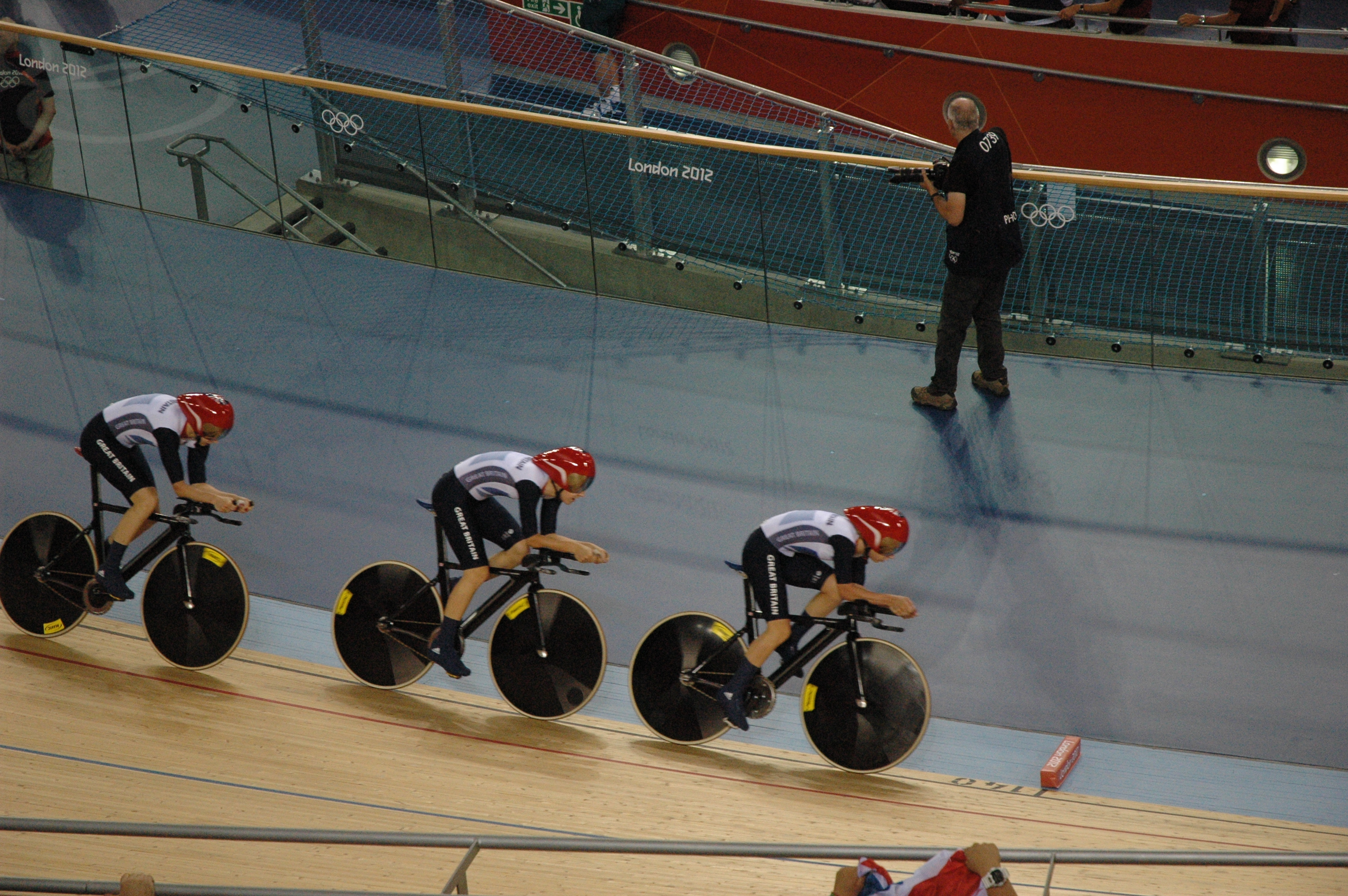
Great Britain won the first women's team pursuit title with a world record.

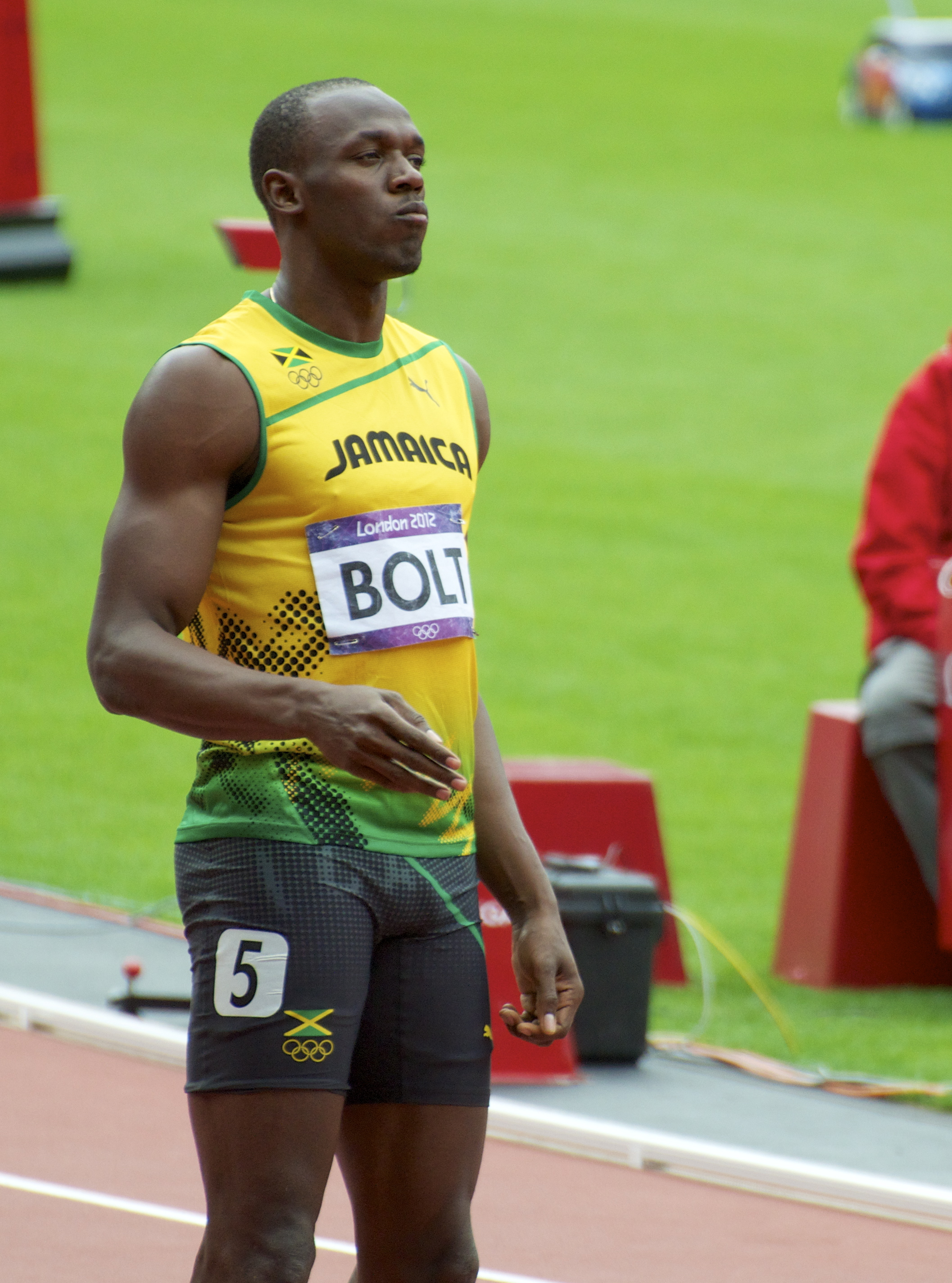
Usain Bolt became the first person to successfully defend both the 100 and 200 metres titles.

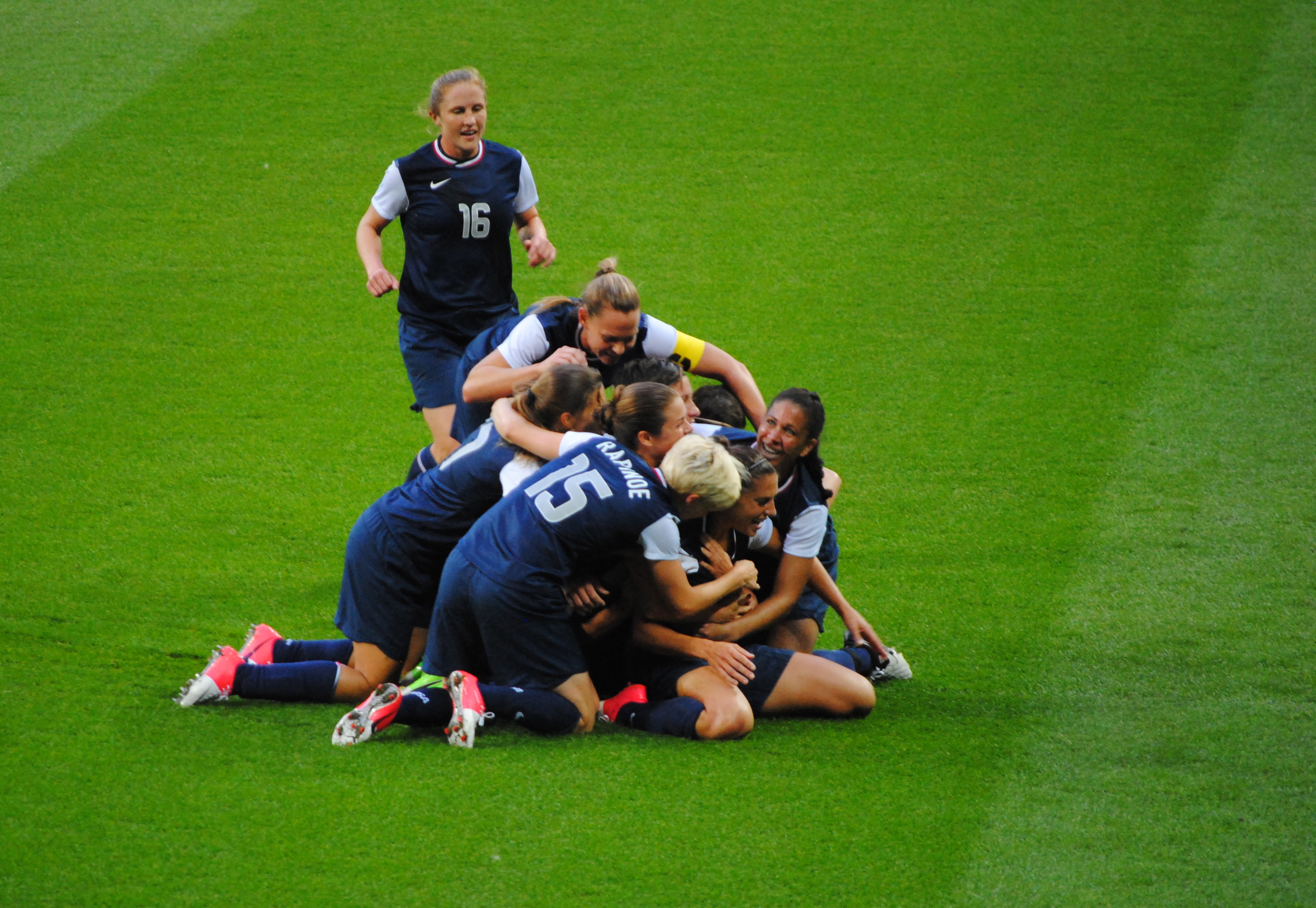
The United States won their third consecutive gold medal in women's football.

The medal table is based on information provided by the International Olympic Committee (IOC) and is consistent with IOC convention in its published medal tables. The table uses the Olympic medal table sorting method. By default, the table is ordered by the number of gold medals the athletes from a nation have won, where a nation is an entity represented by a National Olympic Committee (NOC). The number of silver medals is taken into consideration next, and then the number of bronze medals. If teams are still tied, equal ranking is given and they are listed alphabetically by their IOC country code.

In boxing, judo, taekwondo, and wrestling, two bronze medals are awarded in each weight class. Two silver medals (and no bronze) were awarded for second-place ties in both the men's 200 metre freestyle swimming and the men's 100 metre butterfly swimming events. Two bronze medals were awarded for a third-place tie in the men's keirin cycling race; three bronze medals were awarded for a three-way third-place tie in the men's high jump.

Key

‡ Changes in medal standings (see below)

* Host nation (Great Britain)

2012 Summer Olympics medal table
| Rank | NOC | Gold | Silver | Bronze | Total |
|---|---|---|---|---|---|
| 1 | United States‡ | 48 | 26 | 32 | 106 |
| 2 | China‡ | 39 | 31 | 22 | 92 |
| 3 | Great Britain*‡ | 29 | 18 | 18 | 65 |
| 4 | Russia‡ | 18 | 19 | 26 | 63 |
| 5 | South Korea‡ | 13 | 9 | 9 | 31 |
| 6 | Germany‡ | 11 | 20 | 13 | 44 |
| 7 | France‡ | 11 | 11 | 13 | 35 |
| 8 | Australia‡ | 8 | 15 | 12 | 35 |
| 9 | Italy | 8 | 9 | 11 | 28 |
| 10 | Hungary‡ | 8 | 4 | 6 | 18 |
| 11 | Japan | 7 | 14 | 17 | 38 |
| 12 | Iran‡ | 7 | 5 | 1 | 13 |
| 13 | Netherlands | 6 | 6 | 8 | 20 |
| 14 | New Zealand‡ | 6 | 2 | 5 | 13 |
| 15 | Ukraine‡ | 5 | 4 | 10 | 19 |
| 16 | Cuba‡ | 5 | 3 | 7 | 15 |
| 17 | Spain‡ | 4 | 10 | 6 | 20 |
| 18 | Jamaica‡ | 4 | 5 | 4 | 13 |
| 19 | Czech Republic‡ | 4 | 4 | 3 | 11 |
| 20 | South Africa‡ | 4 | 1 | 1 | 6 |
| 21 | North Korea‡ | 4 | 0 | 3 | 7 |
| 22 | Brazil | 3 | 5 | 9 | 17 |
| 23 | Ethiopia‡ | 3 | 3 | 2 | 8 |
| 24 | Kazakhstan‡ | 3 | 2 | 6 | 11 |
| 24 | Poland‡ | 3 | 2 | 6 | 11 |
| 26 | Croatia | 3 | 1 | 2 | 6 |
| 27 | Canada‡ | 2 | 6 | 10 | 18 |
| 28 | Kenya‡ | 2 | 5 | 6 | 13 |
| 29 | Belarus‡ | 2 | 5 | 3 | 10 |
| 30 | Denmark | 2 | 4 | 3 | 9 |
| 31 | Romania‡ | 2 | 4 | 1 | 7 |
| 32 | Azerbaijan‡ | 2 | 2 | 5 | 9 |
| 33 | Switzerland | 2 | 2 | 0 | 4 |
| 34 | Norway | 2 | 1 | 1 | 4 |
| 35 | Lithuania‡ | 2 | 0 | 3 | 5 |
| 36 | Tunisia‡ | 2 | 0 | 1 | 3 |
| 37 | Sweden | 1 | 4 | 3 | 8 |
| 38 | Colombia‡ | 1 | 3 | 5 | 9 |
| 39 | Mexico‡ | 1 | 3 | 4 | 8 |
| 40 | Georgia‡ | 1 | 2 | 3 | 6 |
| 41 | Ireland‡ | 1 | 1 | 4 | 6 |
| 42 | Argentina | 1 | 1 | 2 | 4 |
| 42 | Serbia | 1 | 1 | 2 | 4 |
| 42 | Slovenia | 1 | 1 | 2 | 4 |
| 42 | Trinidad and Tobago‡ | 1 | 1 | 2 | 4 |
| 46 | Turkey‡ | 1 | 1 | 1 | 3 |
| 47 | Dominican Republic | 1 | 1 | 0 | 2 |
| 48 | Chinese Taipei‡ | 1 | 0 | 1 | 2 |
| 48 | Latvia | 1 | 0 | 1 | 2 |
| 50 | Algeria | 1 | 0 | 0 | 1 |
| 50 | Bahamas | 1 | 0 | 0 | 1 |
| 50 | Bahrain‡ | 1 | 0 | 0 | 1 |
| 50 | Grenada | 1 | 0 | 0 | 1 |
| 50 | Uganda | 1 | 0 | 0 | 1 |
| 50 | Venezuela | 1 | 0 | 0 | 1 |
| 56 | Egypt‡ | 0 | 3 | 1 | 4 |
| 57 | India | 0 | 2 | 4 | 6 |
| 58 | Mongolia | 0 | 2 | 3 | 5 |
| 59 | Thailand‡ | 0 | 2 | 2 | 4 |
| 60 | Bulgaria‡ | 0 | 2 | 1 | 3 |
| 60 | Finland‡ | 0 | 2 | 1 | 3 |
| 60 | Indonesia‡ | 0 | 2 | 1 | 3 |
| 63 | Slovakia | 0 | 1 | 3 | 4 |
| 64 | Belgium | 0 | 1 | 2 | 3 |
| 65 | Armenia‡ | 0 | 1 | 1 | 2 |
| 65 | Estonia | 0 | 1 | 1 | 2 |
| 65 | Malaysia | 0 | 1 | 1 | 2 |
| 65 | Puerto Rico | 0 | 1 | 1 | 2 |
| 65 | Qatar‡ | 0 | 1 | 1 | 2 |
| 70 | Botswana | 0 | 1 | 0 | 1 |
| 70 | Cyprus | 0 | 1 | 0 | 1 |
| 70 | Gabon | 0 | 1 | 0 | 1 |
| 70 | Guatemala | 0 | 1 | 0 | 1 |
| 70 | Montenegro | 0 | 1 | 0 | 1 |
| 70 | Portugal | 0 | 1 | 0 | 1 |
| 76 | Uzbekistan‡ | 0 | 0 | 3 | 3 |
| 77 | Greece | 0 | 0 | 2 | 2 |
| 77 | Singapore | 0 | 0 | 2 | 2 |
| 79 | Afghanistan | 0 | 0 | 1 | 1 |
| 79 | Cameroon‡ | 0 | 0 | 1 | 1 |
| 79 | Hong Kong | 0 | 0 | 1 | 1 |
| 79 | Kuwait | 0 | 0 | 1 | 1 |
| 79 | Morocco | 0 | 0 | 1 | 1 |
| 79 | Saudi Arabia | 0 | 0 | 1 | 1 |
| 79 | Tajikistan | 0 | 0 | 1 | 1 |
| 79 | Vietnam‡ | 0 | 0 | 1 | 1 |
| Totals (86 entries) | | 303 | 305 | 353 | 961 |

== Changes in medal standings ==
On 29 August 2016, a report indicated that a retested sample for Besik Kudukhov of Russia, the silver medallist in the men's 60 kg freestyle wrestling event, had returned a positive result (later disclosed as dehydrochlormethyltestosterone). Kudukhov died in a car crash in December 2013. On 27 October 2016, the International Olympic Committee (IOC) dropped all disciplinary proceedings against Kudukhov, stating that such proceedings cannot be conducted against a deceased person.

Key

※ Disqualified athlete(s)

List of official changes in medal standings (during the Games)
| Ruling date | Sport/Event | Athlete (NOC) | 1st place, gold medalist(s) | 2nd place, silver medalist(s) | 3rd place, bronze medalist(s) | Total | Notes |
|---|---|---|---|---|---|---|---|
| 13 August 2012 | Athletics; Women's shot put | Nadzeya Ostapchuk (BLR) ※ | −1 | | | −1 | On 13 August 2012, the IOC stripped Belarusian athlete Nadzeya Ostapchuk of her gold medal in the women's shot put after she tested positive for the anabolic steroid metenolone. As a result, New Zealand silver medallist Valerie Adams was awarded gold, Russian bronze medallist Yevgeniya Kolodko was awarded silver, and the fourth-placed Gong Lijiao from China was awarded bronze. Kolodko would be later stripped of her silver for doping. |
| 13 August 2012 | Athletics; Women's shot put | Valerie Adams (NZL) | +1 | −1 | | 0 | On 13 August 2012, the IOC stripped Belarusian athlete Nadzeya Ostapchuk of her gold medal in the women's shot put after she tested positive for the anabolic steroid metenolone. As a result, New Zealand silver medallist Valerie Adams was awarded gold, Russian bronze medallist Yevgeniya Kolodko was awarded silver, and the fourth-placed Gong Lijiao from China was awarded bronze. Kolodko would be later stripped of her silver for doping. |
| 13 August 2012 | Athletics; Women's shot put | Yevgeniya Kolodko (RUS) | | +1 | −1 | 0 | On 13 August 2012, the IOC stripped Belarusian athlete Nadzeya Ostapchuk of her gold medal in the women's shot put after she tested positive for the anabolic steroid metenolone. As a result, New Zealand silver medallist Valerie Adams was awarded gold, Russian bronze medallist Yevgeniya Kolodko was awarded silver, and the fourth-placed Gong Lijiao from China was awarded bronze. Kolodko would be later stripped of her silver for doping. |
| 13 August 2012 | Athletics; Women's shot put | Gong Lijiao (CHN) | | | +1 | +1 | On 13 August 2012, the IOC stripped Belarusian athlete Nadzeya Ostapchuk of her gold medal in the women's shot put after she tested positive for the anabolic steroid metenolone. As a result, New Zealand silver medallist Valerie Adams was awarded gold, Russian bronze medallist Yevgeniya Kolodko was awarded silver, and the fourth-placed Gong Lijiao from China was awarded bronze. Kolodko would be later stripped of her silver for doping. |

List of official changes in medal standings (after the Games)
| Ruling date | Sport/Event | Athlete (NOC) | 1st place, gold medalist(s) | 2nd place, silver medalist(s) | 3rd place, bronze medalist(s) | Total | Notes |
|---|---|---|---|---|---|---|---|
| 6 November 2012 | Wrestling; Men's freestyle 74 kg | Soslan Tigiev (UZB) ※ | | | −1 | −1 | On 6 November 2012, the IOC stripped Uzbek wrestler Soslan Tigiev of his bronze medal in the men's freestyle 74 kg division after he tested positive for the banned stimulant methylhexaneamine. Hungary's Gábor Hatos was elevated to the bronze medal position. |
| 6 November 2012 | Wrestling; Men's freestyle 74 kg | Gábor Hatos (HUN) | | | +1 | +1 | On 6 November 2012, the IOC stripped Uzbek wrestler Soslan Tigiev of his bronze medal in the men's freestyle 74 kg division after he tested positive for the banned stimulant methylhexaneamine. Hungary's Gábor Hatos was elevated to the bronze medal position. |
| 1 May 2013 | Athletics; Women's discus throw | Darya Pishchalnikova (RUS) ※ | | −1 | | −1 | On 1 May 2013, the IOC banned Russian discus thrower Darya Pishchalnikova from competition for ten years, and stripped her of her silver medal in the women's discus throw after testing positive for oxandrolone (an anabolic steroid). China's Li Yanfeng was awarded the silver medal, and Cuba's Yarelys Barrios was given the bronze medal. |
| 1 May 2013 | Athletics; Women's discus throw | Li Yanfeng (CHN) | | +1 | −1 | 0 | On 1 May 2013, the IOC banned Russian discus thrower Darya Pishchalnikova from competition for ten years, and stripped her of her silver medal in the women's discus throw after testing positive for oxandrolone (an anabolic steroid). China's Li Yanfeng was awarded the silver medal, and Cuba's Yarelys Barrios was given the bronze medal. |
| 1 May 2013 | Athletics; Women's discus throw | Yarelys Barrios (CUB) | | | +1 | +1 | On 1 May 2013, the IOC banned Russian discus thrower Darya Pishchalnikova from competition for ten years, and stripped her of her silver medal in the women's discus throw after testing positive for oxandrolone (an anabolic steroid). China's Li Yanfeng was awarded the silver medal, and Cuba's Yarelys Barrios was given the bronze medal. |
| 20 May 2015 | Athletics; Men's 4 × 100 metres relay | United States Ryan Bailey ※ Jeffery Demps ※ Justin Gatlin ※ Tyson Gay ※ Trell Kimmons ※ Darvis Patton ※ | | −1 | | −1 | In May 2014, the United States Anti-Doping Agency imposed a one-year suspension on 4 × 100 m relay team member Tyson Gay. In May 2015, the IOC formally requested the United States Olympic Committee to collect the medals from teammates Trell Kimmons, Justin Gatlin, Ryan Bailey, Jeffery Demps and Darvis Patton. The Trinidad and Tobago relay team received the silver medals, and France's relay team was awarded the bronze. |
| 20 May 2015 | Athletics; Men's 4 × 100 metres relay | Trinidad and Tobago Keston Bledman; Marc Burns; Emmanuel Callender; Richard Thompson | | +1 | −1 | 0 | In May 2014, the United States Anti-Doping Agency imposed a one-year suspension on 4 × 100 m relay team member Tyson Gay. In May 2015, the IOC formally requested the United States Olympic Committee to collect the medals from teammates Trell Kimmons, Justin Gatlin, Ryan Bailey, Jeffery Demps and Darvis Patton. The Trinidad and Tobago relay team received the silver medals, and France's relay team was awarded the bronze. |
| 20 May 2015 | Athletics; Men's 4 × 100 metres relay | France Christophe Lemaitre; Pierre-Alexis Pessonneaux; Ronald Pognon; Jimmy Vicaut | | | +1 | +1 | In May 2014, the United States Anti-Doping Agency imposed a one-year suspension on 4 × 100 m relay team member Tyson Gay. In May 2015, the IOC formally requested the United States Olympic Committee to collect the medals from teammates Trell Kimmons, Justin Gatlin, Ryan Bailey, Jeffery Demps and Darvis Patton. The Trinidad and Tobago relay team received the silver medals, and France's relay team was awarded the bronze. |
| 17 August 2015 | Athletics; Women's 1500 metres | Aslı Çakır Alptekin (TUR) ※ | −1 | | | −1 | On 17 August 2015, the Court of Arbitration for Sport approved a settlement that was agreed to by Turkish athlete Aslı Çakır Alptekin, Turkish Athletic Federation, and the International Association of Athletics Federations (IAAF). Alptekin has agreed to forfeit her 1500 metres Olympic title and serve an eight-year ban for blood doping. |
| 17 August 2015 | Athletics; Women's 1500 metres | For reallocation of medals see 29 March 2017 | | | | | On 17 August 2015, the Court of Arbitration for Sport approved a settlement that was agreed to by Turkish athlete Aslı Çakır Alptekin, Turkish Athletic Federation, and the International Association of Athletics Federations (IAAF). Alptekin has agreed to forfeit her 1500 metres Olympic title and serve an eight-year ban for blood doping. |
| 24 March 2016 | Athletics; Men's 50 kilometres walk | Sergey Kirdyapkin (RUS) ※ | −1 | | | −1 | On 24 March 2016, the Court of Arbitration for Sport issued a decision that all competitive results obtained by Sergey Kirdyapkin from 20 August 2009 to 15 October 2012 were disqualified. The IOC confirmed the stripping of Sergey Kirdyapkin's gold medal in the men's 50 km walk and the redistribution of the medals. As a result, Australian walker Jared Tallent, China's Si Tianfeng, and Ireland's Robert Heffernan were given gold, silver, and bronze respectively. |
| 24 March 2016 | Athletics; Men's 50 kilometres walk | Jared Tallent (AUS) | +1 | −1 | | 0 | On 24 March 2016, the Court of Arbitration for Sport issued a decision that all competitive results obtained by Sergey Kirdyapkin from 20 August 2009 to 15 October 2012 were disqualified. The IOC confirmed the stripping of Sergey Kirdyapkin's gold medal in the men's 50 km walk and the redistribution of the medals. As a result, Australian walker Jared Tallent, China's Si Tianfeng, and Ireland's Robert Heffernan were given gold, silver, and bronze respectively. |
| 24 March 2016 | Athletics; Men's 50 kilometres walk | Si Tianfeng (CHN) | | +1 | −1 | 0 | On 24 March 2016, the Court of Arbitration for Sport issued a decision that all competitive results obtained by Sergey Kirdyapkin from 20 August 2009 to 15 October 2012 were disqualified. The IOC confirmed the stripping of Sergey Kirdyapkin's gold medal in the men's 50 km walk and the redistribution of the medals. As a result, Australian walker Jared Tallent, China's Si Tianfeng, and Ireland's Robert Heffernan were given gold, silver, and bronze respectively. |
| 24 March 2016 | Athletics; Men's 50 kilometres walk | Robert Heffernan (IRL) | | | +1 | +1 | On 24 March 2016, the Court of Arbitration for Sport issued a decision that all competitive results obtained by Sergey Kirdyapkin from 20 August 2009 to 15 October 2012 were disqualified. The IOC confirmed the stripping of Sergey Kirdyapkin's gold medal in the men's 50 km walk and the redistribution of the medals. As a result, Australian walker Jared Tallent, China's Si Tianfeng, and Ireland's Robert Heffernan were given gold, silver, and bronze respectively. |
| 24 March 2016 | Athletics; Women's 20 kilometres walk | Olga Kaniskina (RUS) ※ | | −1 | | −1 | On 24 March 2016, the Court of Arbitration for Sport ruled that all competitive results obtained by Olga Kaniskina from 15 August 2009 to 15 October 2012 were disqualified and stated that the possible re-allocation of medals is a matter for IAAF to determine. The IOC confirmed the stripping of Olga Kaniskina's silver medal in women's 20 km walk. The IOC requested the IAAF to modify the results of this event accordingly, and medals were redistributed. |
| 24 March 2016 | Athletics; Women's 20 kilometres walk | Qieyang Shenjie (CHN) | | +1 | −1 | 0 | On 24 March 2016, the Court of Arbitration for Sport ruled that all competitive results obtained by Olga Kaniskina from 15 August 2009 to 15 October 2012 were disqualified and stated that the possible re-allocation of medals is a matter for IAAF to determine. The IOC confirmed the stripping of Olga Kaniskina's silver medal in women's 20 km walk. The IOC requested the IAAF to modify the results of this event accordingly, and medals were redistributed. |
| 24 March 2016 | Athletics; Women's 20 kilometres walk | Liu Hong (CHN) | | | +1 | +1 | On 24 March 2016, the Court of Arbitration for Sport ruled that all competitive results obtained by Olga Kaniskina from 15 August 2009 to 15 October 2012 were disqualified and stated that the possible re-allocation of medals is a matter for IAAF to determine. The IOC confirmed the stripping of Olga Kaniskina's silver medal in women's 20 km walk. The IOC requested the IAAF to modify the results of this event accordingly, and medals were redistributed. |
| 24 March 2016 | Athletics; Women's 3000 metres steeplechase | Yuliya Zaripova (RUS) ※ | −1 | | | −1 | On 30 January 2015, the IOC confirmed that runner Yuliya Zaripova tested positive for steroids. One year later, on 24 March 2016, the Court of Arbitration for Sport disqualified her for doping and confirmed that she would be stripped of her gold medal. On 4 June 2016, the gold medal was officially reallocated to second place Habiba Ghribi from Tunisia by the IOC, and the IAAF updated the results. Marta Dominguez from Spain was also disqualified. Ghribi received her gold medal on 4 June 2016. |
| 24 March 2016 | Athletics; Women's 3000 metres steeplechase | Habiba Ghribi (TUN) | +1 | −1 | | 0 | On 30 January 2015, the IOC confirmed that runner Yuliya Zaripova tested positive for steroids. One year later, on 24 March 2016, the Court of Arbitration for Sport disqualified her for doping and confirmed that she would be stripped of her gold medal. On 4 June 2016, the gold medal was officially reallocated to second place Habiba Ghribi from Tunisia by the IOC, and the IAAF updated the results. Marta Dominguez from Spain was also disqualified. Ghribi received her gold medal on 4 June 2016. |
| 24 March 2016 | Athletics; Women's 3000 metres steeplechase | Sofia Assefa (ETH) | | +1 | −1 | 0 | On 30 January 2015, the IOC confirmed that runner Yuliya Zaripova tested positive for steroids. One year later, on 24 March 2016, the Court of Arbitration for Sport disqualified her for doping and confirmed that she would be stripped of her gold medal. On 4 June 2016, the gold medal was officially reallocated to second place Habiba Ghribi from Tunisia by the IOC, and the IAAF updated the results. Marta Dominguez from Spain was also disqualified. Ghribi received her gold medal on 4 June 2016. |
| 24 March 2016 | Athletics; Women's 3000 metres steeplechase | Milcah Chemos Cheywa (KEN) | | | +1 | +1 | On 30 January 2015, the IOC confirmed that runner Yuliya Zaripova tested positive for steroids. One year later, on 24 March 2016, the Court of Arbitration for Sport disqualified her for doping and confirmed that she would be stripped of her gold medal. On 4 June 2016, the gold medal was officially reallocated to second place Habiba Ghribi from Tunisia by the IOC, and the IAAF updated the results. Marta Dominguez from Spain was also disqualified. Ghribi received her gold medal on 4 June 2016. |
| 13 July 2016 | Weightlifting; Women's 58 kg | Yuliya Kalina (UKR) ※ | | | −1 | −1 | On 13 July 2016, the IOC announced that Yuliya Kalina of Ukraine has been disqualified from the 2012 Summer Olympics and ordered to return the bronze medal from the 58 kg weightlifting event. Reanalysis of Kalina's samples from London 2012 resulted in a positive test for the prohibited substance dehydrochlormethyltestosterone (turinabol). The IOC had requested the International Wrestling Federation to modify the results of the weightlifting events, and the IWF reallocated medals accordingly. |
| 13 July 2016 | Weightlifting; Women's 58 kg | Rattikan Gulnoi (THA) | | | +1 | +1 | On 13 July 2016, the IOC announced that Yuliya Kalina of Ukraine has been disqualified from the 2012 Summer Olympics and ordered to return the bronze medal from the 58 kg weightlifting event. Reanalysis of Kalina's samples from London 2012 resulted in a positive test for the prohibited substance dehydrochlormethyltestosterone (turinabol). The IOC had requested the International Wrestling Federation to modify the results of the weightlifting events, and the IWF reallocated medals accordingly. |
| 9 August 2016 | Athletics; Men's javelin throw | Oleksandr Pyatnytsya (UKR) ※ | | −1 | | −1 | On 9 August 2016, the IOC announced that Oleksandr Pyatnytsya of Ukraine would be stripped of his silver medal in the javelin throw after he tested positive for the prohibited substance dehydrochlormethyltestosterone (turinabol). The IOC requested the IAAF to modify the results of this event accordingly. On 22 February 2017, Antti Ruuskanen received the silver medal in Finland. Vítězslav Veselý received the bronze medal during Golden Spike Ostrava on 28 June 2017. |
| 9 August 2016 | Athletics; Men's javelin throw | Antti Ruuskanen (FIN) | | +1 | −1 | 0 | On 9 August 2016, the IOC announced that Oleksandr Pyatnytsya of Ukraine would be stripped of his silver medal in the javelin throw after he tested positive for the prohibited substance dehydrochlormethyltestosterone (turinabol). The IOC requested the IAAF to modify the results of this event accordingly. On 22 February 2017, Antti Ruuskanen received the silver medal in Finland. Vítězslav Veselý received the bronze medal during Golden Spike Ostrava on 28 June 2017. |
| 9 August 2016 | Athletics; Men's javelin throw | Vítězslav Veselý (CZE) | | | +1 | +1 | On 9 August 2016, the IOC announced that Oleksandr Pyatnytsya of Ukraine would be stripped of his silver medal in the javelin throw after he tested positive for the prohibited substance dehydrochlormethyltestosterone (turinabol). The IOC requested the IAAF to modify the results of this event accordingly. On 22 February 2017, Antti Ruuskanen received the silver medal in Finland. Vítězslav Veselý received the bronze medal during Golden Spike Ostrava on 28 June 2017. |
| 20 August 2016 | Athletics; Women's shot put | Yevgeniya Kolodko (RUS) ※ | | −1 | | −1 | On 20 August 2016, the IOC announced that Yevgeniya Kolodko of Russia would be stripped of her silver medal in shot put after she tested positive for dehydrochlormethyltestosterone (turinabol) and ipamorelin. Kolodko had been upgraded to a silver medal during the 2012 London Games after the first-place finisher had been stripped of her gold medal for doping. The IOC requested the IAAF to modify the results of this event accordingly, and medals were redistributed. |
| 20 August 2016 | Athletics; Women's shot put | Gong Lijiao (CHN) | | +1 | −1 | 0 | On 20 August 2016, the IOC announced that Yevgeniya Kolodko of Russia would be stripped of her silver medal in shot put after she tested positive for dehydrochlormethyltestosterone (turinabol) and ipamorelin. Kolodko had been upgraded to a silver medal during the 2012 London Games after the first-place finisher had been stripped of her gold medal for doping. The IOC requested the IAAF to modify the results of this event accordingly, and medals were redistributed. |
| 20 August 2016 | Athletics; Women's shot put | Li Ling (CHN) | | | +1 | +1 | On 20 August 2016, the IOC announced that Yevgeniya Kolodko of Russia would be stripped of her silver medal in shot put after she tested positive for dehydrochlormethyltestosterone (turinabol) and ipamorelin. Kolodko had been upgraded to a silver medal during the 2012 London Games after the first-place finisher had been stripped of her gold medal for doping. The IOC requested the IAAF to modify the results of this event accordingly, and medals were redistributed. |
| 11 October 2016 | Athletics; Women's hammer throw | Tatyana Lysenko (RUS) ※ | −1 | | | −1 | On 11 October 2016, Tatyana Lysenko of the Russian Federation was disqualified from the women's hammer throw, in which she won the gold medal. She had tested positive for a banned substance. The IOC requested the IAAF to modify the results accordingly, and the medals were redistributed. |
| 11 October 2016 | Athletics; Women's hammer throw | Anita Włodarczyk (POL) | +1 | −1 | | 0 | On 11 October 2016, Tatyana Lysenko of the Russian Federation was disqualified from the women's hammer throw, in which she won the gold medal. She had tested positive for a banned substance. The IOC requested the IAAF to modify the results accordingly, and the medals were redistributed. |
| 11 October 2016 | Athletics; Women's hammer throw | Betty Heidler (GER) | | +1 | −1 | 0 | On 11 October 2016, Tatyana Lysenko of the Russian Federation was disqualified from the women's hammer throw, in which she won the gold medal. She had tested positive for a banned substance. The IOC requested the IAAF to modify the results accordingly, and the medals were redistributed. |
| 11 October 2016 | Athletics; Women's hammer throw | Zhang Wenxiu (CHN) | | | +1 | +1 | On 11 October 2016, Tatyana Lysenko of the Russian Federation was disqualified from the women's hammer throw, in which she won the gold medal. She had tested positive for a banned substance. The IOC requested the IAAF to modify the results accordingly, and the medals were redistributed. |
| 18 October 2016 | Weightlifting; Men's 85 kg | Apti Aukhadov (RUS) ※ | | −1 | | −1 | On 18 October 2016, the IOC disqualified Apti Aukhadov of the Russian Federation for doping and stripped him of the silver medal. The IOC requested the IWF to modify the results of the weightlifting events, and the IWF reallocated the medals accordingly. |
| 18 October 2016 | Weightlifting; Men's 85 kg | Kianoush Rostami (IRI) | | +1 | −1 | 0 | On 18 October 2016, the IOC disqualified Apti Aukhadov of the Russian Federation for doping and stripped him of the silver medal. The IOC requested the IWF to modify the results of the weightlifting events, and the IWF reallocated the medals accordingly. |
| 18 October 2016 | Weightlifting; Men's 85 kg | Tarek Yehia (EGY) | | | +1 | +1 | On 18 October 2016, the IOC disqualified Apti Aukhadov of the Russian Federation for doping and stripped him of the silver medal. The IOC requested the IWF to modify the results of the weightlifting events, and the IWF reallocated the medals accordingly. |
| 27 October 2016 | Weightlifting; Women's 53 kg | Zulfiya Chinshanlo (KAZ) ※ | −1 | | | −1 | On 27 October 2016, the IOC disqualified eight athletes for failing doping tests at the Games. This included four medal winners including Zulfiya Chinshanlo, Maiya Maneza and Svetlana Podobedova all from Kazakhstan, and Maryna Shkermankova of Belarus. The IOC requested the IWF to modify the results of the weightlifting events, and the IWF reallocated medals accordingly. |
| 27 October 2016 | Weightlifting; Women's 53 kg | For reallocation of medals see 21 November 2016 | | | | | On 27 October 2016, the IOC disqualified eight athletes for failing doping tests at the Games. This included four medal winners including Zulfiya Chinshanlo, Maiya Maneza and Svetlana Podobedova all from Kazakhstan, and Maryna Shkermankova of Belarus. The IOC requested the IWF to modify the results of the weightlifting events, and the IWF reallocated medals accordingly. |
| 27 October 2016 | Weightlifting; Women's 63 kg | Maiya Maneza (KAZ) ※ | −1 | | | −1 | On 27 October 2016, the IOC disqualified eight athletes for failing doping tests at the Games. This included four medal winners including Zulfiya Chinshanlo, Maiya Maneza and Svetlana Podobedova all from Kazakhstan, and Maryna Shkermankova of Belarus. The IOC requested the IWF to modify the results of the weightlifting events, and the IWF reallocated medals accordingly. |
| 27 October 2016 | Weightlifting; Women's 63 kg | For reallocation of medals see 5 April 2017 | | | | | On 27 October 2016, the IOC disqualified eight athletes for failing doping tests at the Games. This included four medal winners including Zulfiya Chinshanlo, Maiya Maneza and Svetlana Podobedova all from Kazakhstan, and Maryna Shkermankova of Belarus. The IOC requested the IWF to modify the results of the weightlifting events, and the IWF reallocated medals accordingly. |
| 27 October 2016 | Weightlifting; Women's 69 kg | Maryna Shkermankova (BLR) ※ | | | −1 | −1 | On 27 October 2016, the IOC disqualified eight athletes for failing doping tests at the Games. This included four medal winners including Zulfiya Chinshanlo, Maiya Maneza and Svetlana Podobedova all from Kazakhstan, and Maryna Shkermankova of Belarus. The IOC requested the IWF to modify the results of the weightlifting events, and the IWF reallocated medals accordingly. |
| 27 October 2016 | Weightlifting; Women's 69 kg | Anna Nurmukhambetova (KAZ) | | | +1 | +1 | On 27 October 2016, the IOC disqualified eight athletes for failing doping tests at the Games. This included four medal winners including Zulfiya Chinshanlo, Maiya Maneza and Svetlana Podobedova all from Kazakhstan, and Maryna Shkermankova of Belarus. The IOC requested the IWF to modify the results of the weightlifting events, and the IWF reallocated medals accordingly. |
| 27 October 2016 | Weightlifting; Women's 75 kg | Svetlana Podobedova (KAZ) ※ | −1 | | | −1 | On 27 October 2016, the IOC disqualified eight athletes for failing doping tests at the Games. This included four medal winners including Zulfiya Chinshanlo, Maiya Maneza and Svetlana Podobedova all from Kazakhstan, and Maryna Shkermankova of Belarus. The IOC requested the IWF to modify the results of the weightlifting events, and the IWF reallocated medals accordingly. |
| 27 October 2016 | Weightlifting; Women's 75 kg | For reallocation of medals see 21 November 2016 | | | | | On 27 October 2016, the IOC disqualified eight athletes for failing doping tests at the Games. This included four medal winners including Zulfiya Chinshanlo, Maiya Maneza and Svetlana Podobedova all from Kazakhstan, and Maryna Shkermankova of Belarus. The IOC requested the IWF to modify the results of the weightlifting events, and the IWF reallocated medals accordingly. |
| 21 November 2016 | Weightlifting; Men's 94 kg | Aleksandr Ivanov (RUS) ※ | | −1 | | −1 | On 21 November 2016, the IOC disqualified a further 12 athletes for failing doping tests at the Games. This included six medal winners in weightlifting including Alexandr Ivanov (Russia), Anatoli Ciricu (Moldova), Cristina Iovu (Moldova), Nataliya Zabolotnaya (Russia), Iryna Kulesha (Belarus), Hripsime Khurshudyan (Armenia). The IOC requested the IWF to modify the results of the weightlifting events, and the IWF reallocated medals accordingly. |
| 21 November 2016 | Weightlifting; Men's 94 kg | Anatolie Cîrîcu (MDA) ※ | | | −1 | −1 | On 21 November 2016, the IOC disqualified a further 12 athletes for failing doping tests at the Games. This included six medal winners in weightlifting including Alexandr Ivanov (Russia), Anatoli Ciricu (Moldova), Cristina Iovu (Moldova), Nataliya Zabolotnaya (Russia), Iryna Kulesha (Belarus), Hripsime Khurshudyan (Armenia). The IOC requested the IWF to modify the results of the weightlifting events, and the IWF reallocated medals accordingly. |
| 21 November 2016 | Weightlifting; Men's 94 kg | For reallocation of medals see 25 November 2016 | | | | | On 21 November 2016, the IOC disqualified a further 12 athletes for failing doping tests at the Games. This included six medal winners in weightlifting including Alexandr Ivanov (Russia), Anatoli Ciricu (Moldova), Cristina Iovu (Moldova), Nataliya Zabolotnaya (Russia), Iryna Kulesha (Belarus), Hripsime Khurshudyan (Armenia). The IOC requested the IWF to modify the results of the weightlifting events, and the IWF reallocated medals accordingly. |
| 21 November 2016 | Weightlifting; Women's 53 kg | Cristina Iovu (MDA) ※ | | | −1 | −1 | On 21 November 2016, the IOC disqualified a further 12 athletes for failing doping tests at the Games. This included six medal winners in weightlifting including Alexandr Ivanov (Russia), Anatoli Ciricu (Moldova), Cristina Iovu (Moldova), Nataliya Zabolotnaya (Russia), Iryna Kulesha (Belarus), Hripsime Khurshudyan (Armenia). The IOC requested the IWF to modify the results of the weightlifting events, and the IWF reallocated medals accordingly. |
| 21 November 2016 | Weightlifting; Women's 53 kg | Hsu Shu-ching (TPE) | +1 | −1 | | 0 | On 21 November 2016, the IOC disqualified a further 12 athletes for failing doping tests at the Games. This included six medal winners in weightlifting including Alexandr Ivanov (Russia), Anatoli Ciricu (Moldova), Cristina Iovu (Moldova), Nataliya Zabolotnaya (Russia), Iryna Kulesha (Belarus), Hripsime Khurshudyan (Armenia). The IOC requested the IWF to modify the results of the weightlifting events, and the IWF reallocated medals accordingly. |
| 21 November 2016 | Weightlifting; Women's 53 kg | Citra Febrianti (INA) | | +1 | | +1 | On 21 November 2016, the IOC disqualified a further 12 athletes for failing doping tests at the Games. This included six medal winners in weightlifting including Alexandr Ivanov (Russia), Anatoli Ciricu (Moldova), Cristina Iovu (Moldova), Nataliya Zabolotnaya (Russia), Iryna Kulesha (Belarus), Hripsime Khurshudyan (Armenia). The IOC requested the IWF to modify the results of the weightlifting events, and the IWF reallocated medals accordingly. |
| 21 November 2016 | Weightlifting; Women's 53 kg | Iulia Paratova (UKR) | | | +1 | +1 | On 21 November 2016, the IOC disqualified a further 12 athletes for failing doping tests at the Games. This included six medal winners in weightlifting including Alexandr Ivanov (Russia), Anatoli Ciricu (Moldova), Cristina Iovu (Moldova), Nataliya Zabolotnaya (Russia), Iryna Kulesha (Belarus), Hripsime Khurshudyan (Armenia). The IOC requested the IWF to modify the results of the weightlifting events, and the IWF reallocated medals accordingly. |
| 21 November 2016 | Weightlifting; Women's 75 kg | Natalya Zabolotnaya (RUS) ※ | | −1 | | −1 | On 21 November 2016, the IOC disqualified a further 12 athletes for failing doping tests at the Games. This included six medal winners in weightlifting including Alexandr Ivanov (Russia), Anatoli Ciricu (Moldova), Cristina Iovu (Moldova), Nataliya Zabolotnaya (Russia), Iryna Kulesha (Belarus), Hripsime Khurshudyan (Armenia). The IOC requested the IWF to modify the results of the weightlifting events, and the IWF reallocated medals accordingly. |
| 21 November 2016 | Weightlifting; Women's 75 kg | Iryna Kulesha (BLR) ※ | | | −1 | −1 | On 21 November 2016, the IOC disqualified a further 12 athletes for failing doping tests at the Games. This included six medal winners in weightlifting including Alexandr Ivanov (Russia), Anatoli Ciricu (Moldova), Cristina Iovu (Moldova), Nataliya Zabolotnaya (Russia), Iryna Kulesha (Belarus), Hripsime Khurshudyan (Armenia). The IOC requested the IWF to modify the results of the weightlifting events, and the IWF reallocated medals accordingly. |
| 21 November 2016 | Weightlifting; Women's 75 kg | Lydia Valentín (ESP) | +1 | | | +1 | On 21 November 2016, the IOC disqualified a further 12 athletes for failing doping tests at the Games. This included six medal winners in weightlifting including Alexandr Ivanov (Russia), Anatoli Ciricu (Moldova), Cristina Iovu (Moldova), Nataliya Zabolotnaya (Russia), Iryna Kulesha (Belarus), Hripsime Khurshudyan (Armenia). The IOC requested the IWF to modify the results of the weightlifting events, and the IWF reallocated medals accordingly. |
| 21 November 2016 | Weightlifting; Women's 75 kg | Abeer Abdelrahman (EGY) | | +1 | | +1 | On 21 November 2016, the IOC disqualified a further 12 athletes for failing doping tests at the Games. This included six medal winners in weightlifting including Alexandr Ivanov (Russia), Anatoli Ciricu (Moldova), Cristina Iovu (Moldova), Nataliya Zabolotnaya (Russia), Iryna Kulesha (Belarus), Hripsime Khurshudyan (Armenia). The IOC requested the IWF to modify the results of the weightlifting events, and the IWF reallocated medals accordingly. |
| 21 November 2016 | Weightlifting; Women's 75 kg | Madias Nzesso (CMR) | | | +1 | +1 | On 21 November 2016, the IOC disqualified a further 12 athletes for failing doping tests at the Games. This included six medal winners in weightlifting including Alexandr Ivanov (Russia), Anatoli Ciricu (Moldova), Cristina Iovu (Moldova), Nataliya Zabolotnaya (Russia), Iryna Kulesha (Belarus), Hripsime Khurshudyan (Armenia). The IOC requested the IWF to modify the results of the weightlifting events, and the IWF reallocated medals accordingly. |
| 21 November 2016 | Weightlifting; Women's +75 kg | Hripsime Khurshudyan (ARM) ※ | | | −1 | −1 | On 21 November 2016, the IOC disqualified a further 12 athletes for failing doping tests at the Games. This included six medal winners in weightlifting including Alexandr Ivanov (Russia), Anatoli Ciricu (Moldova), Cristina Iovu (Moldova), Nataliya Zabolotnaya (Russia), Iryna Kulesha (Belarus), Hripsime Khurshudyan (Armenia). The IOC requested the IWF to modify the results of the weightlifting events, and the IWF reallocated medals accordingly. |
| 21 November 2016 | Weightlifting; Women's +75 kg | Jang Mi-ran (KOR) | | | +1 | +1 | On 21 November 2016, the IOC disqualified a further 12 athletes for failing doping tests at the Games. This included six medal winners in weightlifting including Alexandr Ivanov (Russia), Anatoli Ciricu (Moldova), Cristina Iovu (Moldova), Nataliya Zabolotnaya (Russia), Iryna Kulesha (Belarus), Hripsime Khurshudyan (Armenia). The IOC requested the IWF to modify the results of the weightlifting events, and the IWF reallocated medals accordingly. |
| 25 November 2016 | Weightlifting; Men's 94 kg | Ilya Ilyin (KAZ) ※ | −1 | | | −1 | On 25 November 2016, the IOC disqualified Ilya Ilin for failing anti-doping test. The IOC requested the IWF to modify the results of the weightlifting events, and the IWF reallocated medals accordingly. |
| 25 November 2016 | Weightlifting; Men's 94 kg | Saeid Mohammadpour (IRI) | +1 | | | +1 | On 25 November 2016, the IOC disqualified Ilya Ilin for failing anti-doping test. The IOC requested the IWF to modify the results of the weightlifting events, and the IWF reallocated medals accordingly. |
| 25 November 2016 | Weightlifting; Men's 94 kg | Kim Min-jae (KOR) | | +1 | | +1 | On 25 November 2016, the IOC disqualified Ilya Ilin for failing anti-doping test. The IOC requested the IWF to modify the results of the weightlifting events, and the IWF reallocated medals accordingly. |
| 25 November 2016 | Weightlifting; Men's 94 kg | Tomasz Zieliński (POL) | | | +1 | +1 | On 25 November 2016, the IOC disqualified Ilya Ilin for failing anti-doping test. The IOC requested the IWF to modify the results of the weightlifting events, and the IWF reallocated medals accordingly. |
| 29 November 2016 | Athletics; Women's heptathlon | Tatyana Chernova (RUS) ※ | | | −1 | −1 | On 29 November 2016, the Court of Arbitration for Sport decided that all competitive results of Tatyana Chernova between 15 August 2011 and 22 July 2013 are annulled. Austra Skujytė was later awarded the bronze medal on 20 December 2018. |
| 29 November 2016 | Athletics; Women's heptathlon | Austra Skujytė (LTU) | | | +1 | +1 | On 29 November 2016, the Court of Arbitration for Sport decided that all competitive results of Tatyana Chernova between 15 August 2011 and 22 July 2013 are annulled. Austra Skujytė was later awarded the bronze medal on 20 December 2018. |
| 1 February 2017 | Athletics; Women's 4 × 400 metres relay | Russia Natalya Antyukh ※ Tatyana Firova ※ Yulia Gushchina ※ Antonina Krivoshapka ※ | | −1 | | −1 | On 1 February 2017, the Russian 4 × 400 metres relay women's team was disqualified due to doping of Antonina Krivoshapka. The IOC requested the IAAF to modify the results accordingly, and medals were redistributed. Both Yuliya Gushchina and Tatyana Firova were also banned for doping in November 2017 and February 2019, respectively. |
| 1 February 2017 | Athletics; Women's 4 × 400 metres relay | Jamaica Christine Day; Shereefa Lloyd; Rosemarie Whyte; Shericka Williams; Novlene Williams-Mills | | +1 | −1 | 0 | On 1 February 2017, the Russian 4 × 400 metres relay women's team was disqualified due to doping of Antonina Krivoshapka. The IOC requested the IAAF to modify the results accordingly, and medals were redistributed. Both Yuliya Gushchina and Tatyana Firova were also banned for doping in November 2017 and February 2019, respectively. |
| 1 February 2017 | Athletics; Women's 4 × 400 metres relay | Ukraine Alina Lohvynenko; Nataliya Pyhyda; Hanna Yaroshchuk; Olha Zemlyak | | | +1 | +1 | On 1 February 2017, the Russian 4 × 400 metres relay women's team was disqualified due to doping of Antonina Krivoshapka. The IOC requested the IAAF to modify the results accordingly, and medals were redistributed. Both Yuliya Gushchina and Tatyana Firova were also banned for doping in November 2017 and February 2019, respectively. |
| 10 February 2017 | Athletics; Women's 800 metres | Mariya Savinova (RUS) ※ | −1 | | | −1 | On 10 February 2017, the Court of Arbitration for Sport upheld a four-year ban that effectively stripped off the gold medal of Mariya Savinova, based upon her biological passport. On 9 November 2015, a WADA Independent report was published in which Russian athlete Ekaterina Poistogova was mentioned as the violator of anti-doping rules. After an investigation, Poistogova was one of five Russian runners whom the World Anti-Doping Agency recommended to receive a lifetime ban for doping during the London Olympics. On 7 April 2017, CAS refused to decide on disqualification from 2012, and disqualify Ekaterina Poistogova from 2015. Thus, Ekaterina Poistogova retained her Olympic 2012 medal in the women's 800 metres athletic event. However, see 22 June 2026. |
| 10 February 2017 | Athletics; Women's 800 metres | Caster Semenya (RSA) | +1 | −1 | | 0 | |
| 10 February 2017 | Athletics; Women's 800 metres | Ekaterina Poistogova (RUS) | | +1 | −1 | 0 | |
| 10 February 2017 | Athletics; Women's 800 metres | Pamela Jelimo (KEN) | | | +1 | +1 | |
| 29 March 2017 | Athletics; Women's 1500 metres | Gamze Bulut (TUR) ※ | | −1 | | −1 | On 29 March 2017, Turkish Gamze Bulut was banned for doping and lost her Olympic silver medal. Previously, on 17 August 2015, the Court of Arbitration for Sport stripped Turkish athlete Aslı Çakır Alptekin of her medal and imposed an eight-year ban on her for blood doping. Fourth-placed finisher Russian Tatyana Tomashova has a previous doping violation and fifth-placed Ethiopian Abeba Aregawi, later representing Sweden was suspended for doping violation on 29 February 2016. Nevertheless, the IOC decided to award Tomashova and Aregawi with the silver and bronze medals, respectively. However, see 3 September 2024. |
| 29 March 2017 | Athletics; Women's 1500 metres | Maryam Yusuf Jamal (BRN) | +1 | | −1 | 0 | |
| 29 March 2017 | Athletics; Women's 1500 metres | Tatyana Tomashova (RUS) | | +1 | | +1 | |
| 29 March 2017 | Athletics; Women's 1500 metres | Abeba Aregawi (ETH) | | | +1 | +1 | |
| 5 April 2017 | Weightlifting; Women's 63 kg | Svetlana Tsarukaeva (RUS) ※ | | −1 | | −1 | On 5 April 2017, the IOC disqualified Russian weightlifter Svetlana Tsarukaeva due to use of turinabol. The IOC requested the IWF to modify the results of the weightlifting events, and the IWF reallocated medals accordingly. |
| 5 April 2017 | Weightlifting; Women's 63 kg | Christine Girard (CAN) | +1 | | −1 | 0 | On 5 April 2017, the IOC disqualified Russian weightlifter Svetlana Tsarukaeva due to use of turinabol. The IOC requested the IWF to modify the results of the weightlifting events, and the IWF reallocated medals accordingly. |
| 5 April 2017 | Weightlifting; Women's 63 kg | Milka Maneva (BUL) | | +1 | | +1 | On 5 April 2017, the IOC disqualified Russian weightlifter Svetlana Tsarukaeva due to use of turinabol. The IOC requested the IWF to modify the results of the weightlifting events, and the IWF reallocated medals accordingly. |
| 5 April 2017 | Weightlifting; Women's 63 kg | Luz Acosta (MEX) | | | +1 | +1 | On 5 April 2017, the IOC disqualified Russian weightlifter Svetlana Tsarukaeva due to use of turinabol. The IOC requested the IWF to modify the results of the weightlifting events, and the IWF reallocated medals accordingly. |
| 17 January 2019, 23 July 2019 | Wrestling; Men's freestyle 120 kg | Davit Modzmanashvili (GEO) ※ | | −1 | | −1 | On 17 January 2019, the IOC stripped Georgian wrestler Davit Modzmanashvili of his silver medal. On 23 July 2019, the IOC stripped Uzbek wrestler Artur Taymazov of his gold medal. In 2020, the IOC redistributed the medals, awarding two gold medals in this event. |
| 17 January 2019, 23 July 2019 | Wrestling; Men's freestyle 120 kg | Artur Taymazov (UZB) ※ | −1 | | | −1 | On 17 January 2019, the IOC stripped Georgian wrestler Davit Modzmanashvili of his silver medal. On 23 July 2019, the IOC stripped Uzbek wrestler Artur Taymazov of his gold medal. In 2020, the IOC redistributed the medals, awarding two gold medals in this event. |
| 17 January 2019, 23 July 2019 | Wrestling; Men's freestyle 120 kg | Komeil Ghasemi (IRI) | +1 | | −1 | 0 | On 17 January 2019, the IOC stripped Georgian wrestler Davit Modzmanashvili of his silver medal. On 23 July 2019, the IOC stripped Uzbek wrestler Artur Taymazov of his gold medal. In 2020, the IOC redistributed the medals, awarding two gold medals in this event. |
| 17 January 2019, 23 July 2019 | Wrestling; Men's freestyle 120 kg | Bilyal Makhov (RUS) | +1 | | −1 | 0 | On 17 January 2019, the IOC stripped Georgian wrestler Davit Modzmanashvili of his silver medal. On 23 July 2019, the IOC stripped Uzbek wrestler Artur Taymazov of his gold medal. In 2020, the IOC redistributed the medals, awarding two gold medals in this event. |
| 17 January 2019, 23 July 2019 | Wrestling; Men's freestyle 120 kg | Tervel Dlagnev (USA) | | | +1 | +1 | On 17 January 2019, the IOC stripped Georgian wrestler Davit Modzmanashvili of his silver medal. On 23 July 2019, the IOC stripped Uzbek wrestler Artur Taymazov of his gold medal. In 2020, the IOC redistributed the medals, awarding two gold medals in this event. |
| 17 January 2019, 23 July 2019 | Wrestling; Men's freestyle 120 kg | Daulet Shabanbay (KAZ) | | | +1 | +1 | On 17 January 2019, the IOC stripped Georgian wrestler Davit Modzmanashvili of his silver medal. On 23 July 2019, the IOC stripped Uzbek wrestler Artur Taymazov of his gold medal. In 2020, the IOC redistributed the medals, awarding two gold medals in this event. |
| 1 February 2019 | Athletics; Men's high jump | Ivan Ukhov (RUS) ※ | −1 | | | −1 | On 1 February 2019, Ivan Ukhov and Svetlana Shkolina of Russia were disqualified by the CAS for taking performance-enhancing drugs. The medals were finally reallocated in 2021. |
| 1 February 2019 | Athletics; Men's high jump | Erik Kynard (USA) | +1 | −1 | | 0 | On 1 February 2019, Ivan Ukhov and Svetlana Shkolina of Russia were disqualified by the CAS for taking performance-enhancing drugs. The medals were finally reallocated in 2021. |
| 1 February 2019 | Athletics; Men's high jump | Mutaz Essa Barshim (QAT) | | +1 | −1 | 0 | On 1 February 2019, Ivan Ukhov and Svetlana Shkolina of Russia were disqualified by the CAS for taking performance-enhancing drugs. The medals were finally reallocated in 2021. |
| 1 February 2019 | Athletics; Men's high jump | Derek Drouin (CAN) | | +1 | −1 | 0 | On 1 February 2019, Ivan Ukhov and Svetlana Shkolina of Russia were disqualified by the CAS for taking performance-enhancing drugs. The medals were finally reallocated in 2021. |
| 1 February 2019 | Athletics; Men's high jump | Robert Grabarz (GBR) | | +1 | −1 | 0 | On 1 February 2019, Ivan Ukhov and Svetlana Shkolina of Russia were disqualified by the CAS for taking performance-enhancing drugs. The medals were finally reallocated in 2021. |
| 1 February 2019 | Athletics; Women's high jump | Svetlana Shkolina (RUS) ※ | | | −1 | −1 | On 1 February 2019, Ivan Ukhov and Svetlana Shkolina of Russia were disqualified by the CAS for taking performance-enhancing drugs. The medals were finally reallocated in 2021. |
| 1 February 2019 | Athletics; Women's high jump | Ruth Beitia (ESP) | | | +1 | +1 | On 1 February 2019, Ivan Ukhov and Svetlana Shkolina of Russia were disqualified by the CAS for taking performance-enhancing drugs. The medals were finally reallocated in 2021. |
| 29 March 2019 | Weightlifting; Men's 56 kg | Valentin Hristov (AZE) ※ | | | −1 | −1 | On 29 March 2019, the IOC stripped Azerbaijani weightlifter Valentin Hristov of his bronze medal. On 25 November 2020, the medals were reallocated accordingly. |
| 29 March 2019 | Weightlifting; Men's 56 kg | Trần Lê Quốc Toàn (VIE) | | | +1 | +1 | On 29 March 2019, the IOC stripped Azerbaijani weightlifter Valentin Hristov of his bronze medal. On 25 November 2020, the medals were reallocated accordingly. |
| 12 June 2019 | Canoeing; Men's C-1 200 metres | Jevgenij Shuklin (LTU) ※ | | −1 | | −1 | On 12 June 2019, the IOC stripped Lithuanian sprint canoeist Jevgenij Shuklin of his silver medal. In 2021 the original bronze medallist Ivan Shtyl was promoted to silver, and Alfonso Benavides of Spain was promoted to bronze. |
| 12 June 2019 | Canoeing; Men's C-1 200 metres | Ivan Shtyl (RUS) | | +1 | −1 | 0 | On 12 June 2019, the IOC stripped Lithuanian sprint canoeist Jevgenij Shuklin of his silver medal. In 2021 the original bronze medallist Ivan Shtyl was promoted to silver, and Alfonso Benavides of Spain was promoted to bronze. |
| 12 June 2019 | Canoeing; Men's C-1 200 metres | Alfonso Benavides (ESP) | | | +1 | +1 | On 12 June 2019, the IOC stripped Lithuanian sprint canoeist Jevgenij Shuklin of his silver medal. In 2021 the original bronze medallist Ivan Shtyl was promoted to silver, and Alfonso Benavides of Spain was promoted to bronze. |
| 19 December 2019 | Weightlifting; Men's 105 kg | Oleksiy Torokhtiy (UKR) ※ | −1 | | | −1 | On 19 December 2019, the IOC stripped Ukraine's weightlifter Oleksiy Torokhtiy of his gold medal. On 25 November 2020, the medals were reallocated accordingly. |
| 19 December 2019 | Weightlifting; Men's 105 kg | Navab Nassirshalal (IRI) | +1 | −1 | | 0 | On 19 December 2019, the IOC stripped Ukraine's weightlifter Oleksiy Torokhtiy of his gold medal. On 25 November 2020, the medals were reallocated accordingly. |
| 19 December 2019 | Weightlifting; Men's 105 kg | Bartłomiej Bonk (POL) | | +1 | −1 | 0 | On 19 December 2019, the IOC stripped Ukraine's weightlifter Oleksiy Torokhtiy of his gold medal. On 25 November 2020, the medals were reallocated accordingly. |
| 19 December 2019 | Weightlifting; Men's 105 kg | Ivan Efremov (UZB) | | | +1 | +1 | On 19 December 2019, the IOC stripped Ukraine's weightlifter Oleksiy Torokhtiy of his gold medal. On 25 November 2020, the medals were reallocated accordingly. |
| 25 November 2020 | Weightlifting; Men's 69 kg | Răzvan Martin (ROU) ※ | | | −1 | −1 | On 25 November 2020 the IOC stripped Romanians weightlifters Răzvan Martin and Roxana Cocoș of their bronze and silver medals respectively. On 8 June 2021, the medals were reallocated accordingly, but the IOC decided not to reallocate the silver medal to Anna Nurmukhambetova of Kazakhstan "at the present time" because she is currently suspended for another doping violation. Just as the redistributed medals are shown for the 2012 weightlifting 69 kg men event, later in 2021 the silver medal was also shown as reallocated by the IOC to Nurmukhambetova in the weightlifting women's 69 kg event. |
| 25 November 2020 | Weightlifting; Men's 69 kg | Kim Myong-hyok (PRK) | | | +1 | +1 | |
| 25 November 2020 | Weightlifting; Women's 69 kg | Roxana Cocoș (ROU) ※ | | −1 | | −1 | |
| 25 November 2020 | Weightlifting; Women's 69 kg | Anna Nurmukhambetova (KAZ) | | +1 | −1 | 0 | |
| 25 November 2020 | Weightlifting; Women's 69 kg | Ubaldina Valoyes (COL) | | | +1 | +1 | |
| 21 March 2022 | Athletics; Women's 20 kilometres walk | Elena Lashmanova (RUS) ※ | −1 | | | −1 | The Athletics Integrity Unit of World Athletics banned Elena Lashmanova for two years and stripped her of Olympic and world titles that she had won from 2012 and 2013. Medals were reallocated accordingly. |
| 21 March 2022 | Athletics; Women's 20 kilometres walk | Qieyang Shenjie (CHN) | +1 | −1 | | 0 | The Athletics Integrity Unit of World Athletics banned Elena Lashmanova for two years and stripped her of Olympic and world titles that she had won from 2012 and 2013. Medals were reallocated accordingly. |
| 21 March 2022 | Athletics; Women's 20 kilometres walk | Liu Hong (CHN) | | +1 | −1 | 0 | The Athletics Integrity Unit of World Athletics banned Elena Lashmanova for two years and stripped her of Olympic and world titles that she had won from 2012 and 2013. Medals were reallocated accordingly. |
| 21 March 2022 | Athletics; Women's 20 kilometres walk | Lü Xiuzhi (CHN) | | | +1 | +1 | The Athletics Integrity Unit of World Athletics banned Elena Lashmanova for two years and stripped her of Olympic and world titles that she had won from 2012 and 2013. Medals were reallocated accordingly. |
| 24 October 2022 | Athletics; Women's 400 metres hurdles | Natalya Antyukh (RUS) ※ | −1 | | | −1 | The Athletics Integrity Unit of World Athletics disqualified the results of Antyukh, who had already been serving a doping ban, from July 2012 onward following the re-analysis of her samples. Medals were reallocated accordingly. |
| 24 October 2022 | Athletics; Women's 400 metres hurdles | Lashinda Demus (USA) | +1 | −1 | | 0 | The Athletics Integrity Unit of World Athletics disqualified the results of Antyukh, who had already been serving a doping ban, from July 2012 onward following the re-analysis of her samples. Medals were reallocated accordingly. |
| 24 October 2022 | Athletics; Women's 400 metres hurdles | Zuzana Hejnová (CZE) | | +1 | −1 | 0 | The Athletics Integrity Unit of World Athletics disqualified the results of Antyukh, who had already been serving a doping ban, from July 2012 onward following the re-analysis of her samples. Medals were reallocated accordingly. |
| 24 October 2022 | Athletics; Women's 400 metres hurdles | Kaliese Spencer (JAM) | | | +1 | +1 | The Athletics Integrity Unit of World Athletics disqualified the results of Antyukh, who had already been serving a doping ban, from July 2012 onward following the re-analysis of her samples. Medals were reallocated accordingly. |
| 19 March 2024 | Weightlifting; Men's +105 kg | Ruslan Albegov (RUS) ※ | | | −1 | −1 | Ruslan Albegov was disqualified following an investigation ruling by the Court of Arbitration for Sport. As a result, the medal was reallocated. |
| 19 March 2024 | Weightlifting; Men's +105 kg | Jeon Sang-guen (KOR) | | | +1 | +1 | Ruslan Albegov was disqualified following an investigation ruling by the Court of Arbitration for Sport. As a result, the medal was reallocated. |
| 3 September 2024 | Athletics; Women's 1500 metres | Tatyana Tomashova (RUS) ※ | | −1 | | −1 | The CAS banned Tatyana Tomashova for 10 years as a doping penalty. In addition, all of her results in competitions from June 21, 2012, to January 3, 2015, were invalidated, including the silver medal to which she had been elevated in a previous reallocation on 29 March 2017. On 26 June 2025, the medals were reallocated accordingly. |
| 3 September 2024 | Athletics; Women's 1500 metres | Abeba Aregawi (ETH) | | +1 | −1 | 0 | The CAS banned Tatyana Tomashova for 10 years as a doping penalty. In addition, all of her results in competitions from June 21, 2012, to January 3, 2015, were invalidated, including the silver medal to which she had been elevated in a previous reallocation on 29 March 2017. On 26 June 2025, the medals were reallocated accordingly. |
| 3 September 2024 | Athletics; Women's 1500 metres | Shannon Rowbury (USA) | | | +1 | +1 | The CAS banned Tatyana Tomashova for 10 years as a doping penalty. In addition, all of her results in competitions from June 21, 2012, to January 3, 2015, were invalidated, including the silver medal to which she had been elevated in a previous reallocation on 29 March 2017. On 26 June 2025, the medals were reallocated accordingly. |
| 22 June 2026 | Athletics; Women's 800 metres | Ekaterina Poistogova (RUS) ※ | | −1 | | −1 | Although she successfully evaded having her medal stripped in 2017, despite confirmed doping use during the Olympics, and even saw bronze upgraded to silver, Ekaterina Poistogova's 2024 ban confirmed beyond reasonable doubt her involvement with Russia's state-sponsored doping during the 2012 Olympics. The IOC disqualified Poistogova's results in 2026. Pamela Jelimo of Kenya was upgraded to silver, and Alysia Montano of the United States to bronze. |
| 22 June 2026 | Athletics; Women's 800 metres | Pamela Jelimo (KEN) | | +1 | −1 | 0 | Although she successfully evaded having her medal stripped in 2017, despite confirmed doping use during the Olympics, and even saw bronze upgraded to silver, Ekaterina Poistogova's 2024 ban confirmed beyond reasonable doubt her involvement with Russia's state-sponsored doping during the 2012 Olympics. The IOC disqualified Poistogova's results in 2026. Pamela Jelimo of Kenya was upgraded to silver, and Alysia Montano of the United States to bronze. |
| 22 June 2026 | Athletics; Women's 800 metres | Alysia Montano (USA) | | | +1 | +1 | Although she successfully evaded having her medal stripped in 2017, despite confirmed doping use during the Olympics, and even saw bronze upgraded to silver, Ekaterina Poistogova's 2024 ban confirmed beyond reasonable doubt her involvement with Russia's state-sponsored doping during the 2012 Olympics. The IOC disqualified Poistogova's results in 2026. Pamela Jelimo of Kenya was upgraded to silver, and Alysia Montano of the United States to bronze. |

A minus sign (−) indicates that medals were either stripped altogether or exchanged for a silver or gold when upgraded in a reallocation.

List of official changes by country
| NOC | Gold | Silver | Bronze | Net Change |
|---|---|---|---|---|
| Russia | −6 | −6 | −7 | −19 |
| Belarus | −1 | 0 | −2 | −3 |
| Kazakhstan | −4 | +1 | +1 | −2 |
| Turkey | −1 | −1 | 0 | −2 |
| Romania | 0 | −1 | −1 | −2 |
| Moldova | 0 | 0 | −2 | −2 |
| Ukraine | −1 | −1 | +1 | −1 |
| Uzbekistan | −1 | 0 | 0 | −1 |
| Georgia | 0 | −1 | 0 | −1 |
| Armenia | 0 | 0 | −1 | −1 |
| Azerbaijan | 0 | 0 | −1 | −1 |
| Lithuania | 0 | −1 | +1 | 0 |
| Finland | 0 | +1 | −1 | 0 |
| Germany | 0 | +1 | −1 | 0 |
| Great Britain | 0 | +1 | −1 | 0 |
| Qatar | 0 | +1 | −1 | 0 |
| Trinidad and Tobago | 0 | +1 | −1 | 0 |
| Australia | +1 | −1 | 0 | 0 |
| New Zealand | +1 | −1 | 0 | 0 |
| South Africa | +1 | −1 | 0 | 0 |
| Chinese Taipei | +1 | −1 | 0 | 0 |
| Tunisia | +1 | −1 | 0 | 0 |
| Bahrain | +1 | 0 | −1 | 0 |
| Canada | +1 | +1 | −2 | 0 |
| Cameroon | 0 | 0 | +1 | +1 |
| Colombia | 0 | 0 | +1 | +1 |
| Cuba | 0 | 0 | +1 | +1 |
| France | 0 | 0 | +1 | +1 |
| Hungary | 0 | 0 | +1 | +1 |
| Ireland | 0 | 0 | +1 | +1 |
| North Korea | 0 | 0 | +1 | +1 |
| Mexico | 0 | 0 | +1 | +1 |
| Thailand | 0 | 0 | +1 | +1 |
| Vietnam | 0 | 0 | +1 | +1 |
| Bulgaria | 0 | +1 | 0 | +1 |
| Czech Republic | 0 | +1 | 0 | +1 |
| Indonesia | 0 | +1 | 0 | +1 |
| Jamaica | 0 | +1 | 0 | +1 |
| Poland | +1 | 0 | 0 | +1 |
| Iran | +3 | 0 | −2 | +1 |
| Kenya | 0 | +1 | +1 | +2 |
| Egypt | 0 | +1 | +1 | +2 |
| Ethiopia | 0 | +2 | 0 | +2 |
| United States | +2 | −3 | +3 | +2 |
| South Korea | 0 | +1 | +2 | +3 |
| Spain | +1 | 0 | +2 | +3 |
| China | +1 | +4 | 0 | +5 |

List of stripped medals

List of stripped medals by country
| NOC | Gold | Silver | Bronze | Change |
|---|---|---|---|---|
| Russia | −7 | −9 | −4 | −20 |
| Kazakhstan | −4 | 0 | 0 | −4 |
| Ukraine | −1 | −1 | −1 | −3 |
| Belarus | −1 | 0 | −2 | −3 |
| Turkey | −1 | −1 | 0 | −2 |
| Uzbekistan | −1 | 0 | −1 | −2 |
| Romania | 0 | −1 | −1 | −2 |
| Moldova | 0 | 0 | −2 | −2 |
| Georgia | 0 | −1 | 0 | −1 |
| Lithuania | 0 | −1 | 0 | −1 |
| United States | 0 | −1 | 0 | −1 |
| Armenia | 0 | 0 | −1 | −1 |
| Azerbaijan | 0 | 0 | −1 | −1 |

== See also ==
- All-time Olympic Games medal table
- 2012 Summer Paralympics medal table
