= 2000 Asian Athletics Championships – Women's shot put =

The women's shot put event at the 2000 Asian Athletics Championships was held in Jakarta, Indonesia on 30 August.

== Results ==
Rank	Name	Nationality	#1	#2	#3	#4	#5	#6	Result	Notes
1st place, gold medalist(s)	Nada Kawar	Jordan	16.84	17.46	17.14	17.26	x	x	17.46	
2nd place, silver medalist(s)	Chinatsu Mori	Japan	16.16	16.19	x	x	16.38	x	16.38	
3rd place, bronze medalist(s)	Cho Jin-Sook	South Korea	15.38	14.99	x	x	15.19	x	15.38	
4	Harwant Kaur	India							15.24	
5	Tatyana Sudarikova	Kyrgyzstan							12.31	
