= Juttaporn Krasaeyan =

Thai shot putter (born 1971)

Personal information
- Born: 13 February 1971 (age 55)

Sport
- Sport: Track and field
Medal record
Representing China
Summer Universiade
Gold medal – first place	1995 Fukuoka	Shot put
Representing Thailand
Asian Games
Bronze medal – third place	1998 Bangkok	Shot put
Bronze medal – third place	2002 Busan	Shot put
Asian Championships
Gold medal – first place	2002 Colombo	Shot put
Asian Indoor Championships
Silver medal – second place	2006 Pattaya	Shot put
Bronze medal – third place	2008 Doha	Shot put
SEA Games
Silver medal – second place	2007 Nakhon Ratchasima	Shot put
Silver medal – second place	2008 Vientiane	Shot put
Bronze medal – third place	2003 Hanoi	Discus throw
Bronze medal – third place	2003 Hanoi	Shot put
Bronze medal – third place	2005 Manila	Shot put
Bronze medal – third place	2009 Vientiane	Discus throw
Bronze medal – third place	2011 Palembang	Shot put

Juttaporn Krasaeyan (Thai: จุฑาภรณ์ กระแสญาณ; born 13 February 1971) is a Thai shot putter. She previously competed for China, where she was born, under the name Wu Xianchun (Chinese: 武宪春; pinyin: Wǔ Xiànchūn).

Her personal best throw is 19.43 metres, achieved in May 1995 in Taiyuan. For Thailand she holds a national record of 18.24 metres, achieved at the 1998 Asian Games in Bangkok. She is also the Thai record holder in discus throw.

== International competitions ==
Year	Competition	Venue	Position	Event	Notes
Representing China
1995	Universiade	Fukuoka, Japan	1st	Shot put	18.31 m
Representing Thailand
1998	Asian Games	Bangkok, Thailand	3rd	Shot put	18.24 m (NR)
1999	World Championships	Seville, Spain	21st (q)	Shot put	17.39 m
2002	Asian Championships	Colombo, Sri Lanka	1st	Shot put	18.05 m
2002	World Cup	Madrid, Spain	8th	Shot put	17.25 m
2002	Asian Games	Busan, South Korea	3rd	Shot put	17.53 m
2003	Asian Championships	Manila, Philippines	5th	Shot put	17.52 m
2003	Afro-Asian Games	Hyderabad, India	3rd	Shot put	16.63 m
2003	Southeast Asian Games	Hanoi, Vietnam	3rd	Shot put	15.41 m
2003	Southeast Asian Games	Hanoi, Vietnam	3rd	Discus throw	48.81 m
2004	Olympic Games	Athens, Greece	25th (q)	Shot put	16.49 m
2005	Asian Indoor Games	Bangkok, Thailand	3rd	Shot put	15.52 m
2005	Southeast Asian Games	Manila, Philippines	3rd	Shot put	14.15 m
2006	Asian Indoor Championships	Pattaya, Thailand	2nd	Shot put	15.34 m
2007	Asian Championships	Amman, Jordan	5th	Shot put	15.27 m
2007	Asian Championships	Amman, Jordan	6th	Discus throw	49.79 m
2007	Asian Indoor Games	Macau	2nd	Shot put	15.69 m
2007	Southeast Asian Games	Nakhon Ratchasima, Thailand	2nd	Shot put	16.06 m
2008	Asian Indoor Championships	Doha, Qatar	3rd	Shot put	14.73 m
2009	Asian Indoor Games	Hanoi, Vietnam	2nd	Shot put	16.12 m
2009	Asian Championships	Guangzhou, China	6th	Shot put	16.02 m
2009	Asian Championships	Guangzhou, China	7th	Discus throw	48.37 m
2009	Southeast Asian Games	Vientiane, Laos	2nd	Shot put	15.77 m
2009	Southeast Asian Games	Vientiane, Laos	3rd	Discus throw	49.12 m
2011	Southeast Asian Games	Palembang, Indonesia	3rd	Shot put	14.37 m
