= 2003 Asian Athletics Championships – Women's shot put =

The women's shot put event at the 2003 Asian Athletics Championships was held in Manila, Philippines on September 20.

== Results ==
Rank	Name	Nationality	Result	Notes
1st place, gold medalist(s)	Li Meiju	China	18.45	
2nd place, silver medalist(s)	Li Fengfeng	China	18.07	
3rd place, bronze medalist(s)	Chinatsu Mori	Japan	17.80	SB
4	Lee Mi-Young	South Korea	17.60	SB
5	Juttaporn Krasaeyan	Thailand	17.52	SB
6	Lee Myung-Sun	South Korea	17.21	
7	Iolanta Ulyeva	Kazakhstan	16.54	
8	Sumi Ichioka	Japan	16.46	
9	Zeenat Parveen	Pakistan	12.05	
	Vasilina Kozyarskaya	Uzbekistan	DNS	
