= Athletics at the 2010 Asian Games – Women's shot put =

Women's shot put at the 2010 Asian Games
- Venue: Aoti Main Stadium
- Date: 21 November 2010
- Competitors: 8 from 7 nations

Medalists
| gold medal | Li Ling | China |
| silver medal | Gong Lijiao | China |
| bronze medal | Lee Mi-young | South Korea |

The women's shot put event at the 2010 Asian Games was held at the Aoti Main Stadium, Guangzhou, China on 21 November 2010.

== Schedule ==
All times are China Standard Time (UTC+08:00)

| Date | Time | Event |
|---|---|---|
| Sunday, 21 November 2010 | 17:15 | Final |

== Records ==
Prior to this competition, the existing world, Asian and Games records were as follows.

| World Record | Natalya Lisovskaya (URS) | 22.63 | Moscow, Soviet Union | 7 June 1987 |
| Asian Record | Li Meisu (CHN) | 21.76 | Shijiazhuang, China | 23 April 1988 |
| Games Record | Sui Xinmei (CHN) | 20.55 | Beijing, China | 1 October 1990 |

== Results ==
| Rank | Athlete | Attempt | | | | | | Result | Notes |
| Rank | Athlete | 1 | 2 | 3 | 4 | 5 | 6 | Result | Notes |
|---|---|---|---|---|---|---|---|---|---|
| 1st place, gold medalist(s) | Li Ling (CHN) | 18.29 | 17.77 | 19.33 | 19.41 | 19.94 | 19.56 | 19.94 | |
| 2nd place, silver medalist(s) | Gong Lijiao (CHN) | 19.67 | X | X | 19.35 | X | X | 19.67 | |
| 3rd place, bronze medalist(s) | Lee Mi-young (KOR) | 16.86 | 17.51 | 17.38 | 16.83 | 16.80 | X | 17.51 | |
| 4 | Lin Chia-ying (TPE) | 16.39 | 17.06 | 16.85 | X | X | X | 17.06 | |
| 5 | Zhang Guirong (SIN) | 16.63 | X | 16.72 | 17.06 | X | 16.44 | 17.06 | |
| 6 | Leila Rajabi (IRI) | 16.25 | 16.17 | X | 16.51 | 15.87 | 16.29 | 16.51 | |
| 7 | Safiya Burkhanova (UZB) | 16.04 | 15.18 | 15.91 | 16.06 | 15.87 | 15.88 | 16.06 | |
| 8 | Pürveegiin Maamuu (MGL) | 11.46 | 11.29 | 11.90 | 11.94 | 11.69 | 11.88 | 11.94 | |
