= Lee Mi-young (shot putter) =

South Korean shot putter (1979-Present)

Medal record

Women's athletics

Representing South Korea

Asian Championships
Silver medal – second place	2007 Amman	Shot put

Lee Mi-Young (Korean: 이미영; born 19 August 1979) is a female shot putter from South Korea.

She finished fourth at the 2003 Asian Championships, sixth at the 2005 Asian Championships, fourth at the 2006 Asian Games and won the silver medal at the 2007 Asian Championships. She also competed at the 2004 Olympic Games, the 2005 World Championships and the 2008 Olympic Games without reaching the final.

Her personal best throw is 17.62 metres, achieved in April 2005 in Kwangju.

== Achievements ==
Year	Competition	Venue	Position	Notes
Representing South Korea
2002	Asian Championships	Colombo, Sri Lanka	4th	15.94 m
2002	Asian Games	Busan, South Korea	7th	15.80 m
2003	Asian Championships	Manila, Philippines	4th	17.60 m
2004	Olympic Games	Athens, Greece	28th (q)	16.35 m
2005	World Championships	Helsinki, Finland	23rd (q)	16.60 m
2005	Asian Championships	Incheon, South Korea	6th	16.20 m
2006	Asian Games	Doha, Qatar	4th	16.68 m
2007	Asian Championships	Amman, Jordan	2nd	16.58 m
2008	Olympic Games	Beijing, China	33rd (q)	15.10 m
2009	Asian Championships	Guangzhou, China	5th	16.18 m
2010	Asian Games	Guangzhou, China	3rd	17.51 m
2011	World Championships	Daegu, South Korea	23rd (q)	16.18 m
2013	Asian Championships	Pune, India	4th	16.74 m
2014	Asian Games	Incheon, South Korea	6th	16.65 m
2018	Asian Games	Jakarta, Indonesia	6th	15.49 m
