= 2007 Asian Athletics Championships – Women's shot put =

The women's shot put event at the 2007 Asian Athletics Championships was held in Amman, Jordan on July 26.

== Results ==
Rank	Name	Nationality	Result	Notes
1st place, gold medalist(s)	Liu Xiangrong	China	17.65	
2nd place, silver medalist(s)	Lee Mi-Young	South Korea	16.58	
3rd place, bronze medalist(s)	Lin Chia-ying	Chinese Taipei	16.46	
4	Zhang Guirong	Singapore	15.99	
5	Juttaporn Krasaeyan	Thailand	15.27	
6	Hiba Omar	Syria	11.24	
	Du Xianhui	Singapore	NM	
