= Zhang Guirong =

Chinese-born Singaporean shot putter

Medal record

Women's athletics

Representing Singapore

Asian Championships
Silver medal – second place	2005 Incheon	Shot put

Zhang Guirong (born 5 February 1978) is a Singaporean shot putter. She changed nationality from China in late 2003.

Initially rejected by Ministry of Community Development and Sports of Singapore for less than two years of being a Singapore permanent resident, her application to be a Singaporean citizen was approved in late 2003.

Her personal best throw is 18.57 metres, achieved at the 2005 Asian Championships in Incheon. This is the current Singaporean record. She is also the national record holder in discus throw and javelin throw.

== Achievements ==
Year	Competition	Venue	Position	Event	Notes
Representing Singapore
2003	Southeast Asian Games	Hanoi, Vietnam	2nd	Shot put	17.96 m
2003	Southeast Asian Games	Hanoi, Vietnam	1st	Discus throw	49.91 m
2003	Southeast Asian Games	Hanoi, Vietnam	2nd	Javelin throw	51.66 m
2004	Olympic Games	Athens, Greece	24th (q)	Shot put	16.58 m
2005	Asian Championships	Incheon, South Korea	2nd	Shot put	18.57 m (=NR)
2005	Asian Indoor Games	Bangkok, Thailand	2nd	Shot put	17.99 m (iNR)
2005	Southeast Asian Games	Manila, Philippines	1st	Shot put	17.40 m
2005	Southeast Asian Games	Manila, Philippines	3rd	Discus throw	48.62 m
2005	Southeast Asian Games	Manila, Philippines	3rd	Javelin throw	48.70 m
2006	Commonwealth Games	Melbourne, Australia	4th	Shot put	17.39 m
2007	Asian Championships	Amman, Jordan	4th	Shot put	15.99 m
2007	Southeast Asian Games	Nakhon Ratchasima, Thailand	1st	Shot put	17.21 m
2007	Southeast Asian Games	Nakhon Ratchasima, Thailand	3rd	Discus throw	45.73 m
2008	Olympic Games	Beijing, China	29th (q)	Shot put	16.23 m
2009	Southeast Asian Games	Vientiane, Laos	1st	Shot put	17.12 m
2010	Asian Games	Guangzhou, China	5th	Shot put	17.06 m
2011	Southeast Asian Games	Palembang, Indonesia	1st	Shot put	16.96 m
2011	Southeast Asian Games	Palembang, Indonesia	3rd	Discus throw	48.22 m
