= 2009 Asian Athletics Championships – Women's shot put =

The women's shot put event at the 2009 Asian Athletics Championships was held at the Guangdong Olympic Stadium on November 10.

== Results ==
Rank	Athlete	Nationality	#1	#2	#3	#4	#5	#6	Result	Notes
1st place, gold medalist(s)	Gong Lijiao	China	19.04	x	18.80	–	–	–	19.04	
2nd place, silver medalist(s)	Liu Xiangrong	China	17.52	17.54	17.55	x	16.82	–	17.55	
3rd place, bronze medalist(s)	Leyla Rajabi	Iran	16.66	16.50	16.71	x	16.15	16.38	16.71	
4	Lin Chia-ying	Chinese Taipei	15.10	16.18	16.18	15.69	–	–	16.18	
5	Lee Mi-young	South Korea	16.05	x	16.18	x	x	x	16.18	
6	Juthaporn Krasaeyan	Thailand	15.24	15.75	15.84	16.02	–	–	16.02	SB
	Zeenat Parveen	Pakistan							DNS	
