= 2005 Asian Athletics Championships – Women's shot put =

The women's shot put event at the 2005 Asian Athletics Championships was held in Incheon, South Korea on September 1.

== Results ==
Rank	Name	Nationality	#1	#2	#3	#4	#5	#6	Result	Notes
1st place, gold medalist(s)	Li Meiju	China							18.64	
2nd place, silver medalist(s)	Zhang Guirong	Singapore							18.57	NR
3rd place, bronze medalist(s)	Li Ling	China							18.04	
4	Yoko Toyonaga	Japan							17.07	SB
5	Du Xianhui	Singapore							16.35	
6	Lee Mi-Young	South Korea							16.20	
7	Iolanta Ulyeva	Kazakhstan							16.01	
8	Lin Chia-ying	Chinese Taipei	12.80	14.90	14.96	15.21	x	x	15.21	NR
