= Leila Rajabi =

Iranian shot putter (born 1983)

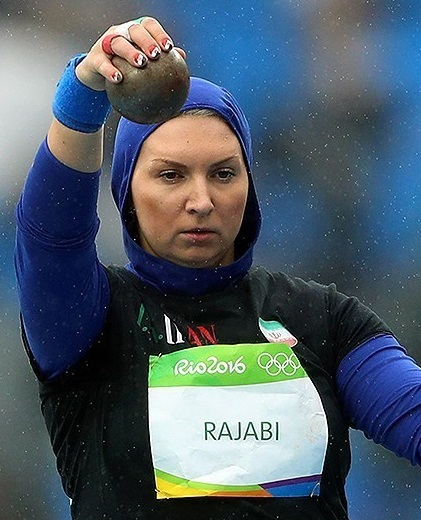
- Rajabi at the 2016 Summer Olympics

Personal information
- Native name: Таццяна Ілюшчанка
- Nationality: Belarusian-Iranian
- Born: Tatyana Ilyushchanka; April 18, 1983 (age 43) Vitebsk, Byelorussian SSR, Soviet Union
- Education: Physical education
- Height: 1.78 m (5 ft 10 in)
- Weight: 86 kg (190 lb; 13 st 8 lb)
- Spouse: Peyman Rajabi

Sport
- Country: Belarus (2001–2007); Iran (2007–Present)
- Sport: Track and field
- Event: Shot put
- Club: Mokhaberat Bushehr

Achievements and titles
- Personal bests: 18.18 m (NR) (2013, Pune, India)
Medal record
Women's athletics
Representing Iran
Asian Games
Silver medal – second place	2014 Incheon	Shot put
Asian Championships
Silver medal – second place	2013 Pune	Shot put
Bronze medal – third place	2009 Guangzhou	Shot put
Bronze medal – third place	2011 Kobe	Shot put
Asian Indoor Games
Gold medal – first place	2009 Hanoi	Shot put
Asian Indoor Championships
Gold medal – first place	2010 Tehran	Shot put
Silver medal – second place	2012 Hangzhou	Shot put

Leila Rajabi (Persian: لیلا رجبی, born Tatyana Ilyushchanka (Note: Belarusian: Таццяна Ілюшчанка, Russian: Татьяна Илющанка) on 18 April 1983 in Vitebsk, Byelorussian SSR, Soviet Union) is a naturalized Iranian shot putter of Belarusian origin.

== Career ==
She acquired Iranian citizenship and converted to Islam after she married Iranian athlete Peiman Rajabi. She changed her name to "Leila Rajabi," and decided to represent Iran instead of her birthplace Belarus. Rajabi immediately broke Iran national record in shot put, improving it about 3 metres and currently is the record holder.

== Competition record ==
Year	Competition	Venue	Position	Event	Notes
Representing Belarus
2002	World Junior Championships	Kingston, Jamaica	5th	Shot put	16.18 m
2005	European Cup First League	Leiria, Portugal	2nd	Shot put	17.19 m
2005	European U23 Championships	Erfurt, Germany	7th	Shot put	16.49 m
2006	European Cup Winter Throwing	Tel Aviv, Israel	6th	Shot put	17.37 m
2007	European Cup Winter Throwing	Yalta, Ukraine	4th	Shot put	16.43 m
Representing Iran
2009	World Championships	Berlin, Germany	25th (q)	Shot put	16.60 m
2009	Asian Indoor Games	Hanoi, Vietnam	1st	Shot put	17.07 m
2009	Asian Championships	Guangzhou, China	3rd	Shot put	16.71 m
2010	Asian Indoor Championships	Tehran, Iran	1st	Shot put	17.32 m NR
2010	West Asian Championships	Aleppo, Syria	1st	Shot put	17.43 m
2010	Asian Games	Guangzhou, China	6th	Shot put	16.51 m
2011	Asian Championships	Kobe, Japan	3rd	Shot put	16.60 m
2012	Asian Indoor Championships	Hangzhou, China	2nd	Shot put	17.51 m
2012	World Indoor Championships	Istanbul, Turkey	12th (q)	Shot put	17.29 m
2012	West Asian Championships	Dubai, United Arab Emirates	1st	Shot put	16.96 m
2012	West Asian Championships	Dubai, United Arab Emirates	1st	Discus throw	41.21 m
2012	Olympic Games	London, United Kingdom	21st (q)	Shot put	17.55 m
2013	Asian Championships	Pune, India	2nd	Shot put	18.18 m NR
2013	Islamic Solidarity Games	Palembang, Indonesia	1st	Shot put	17.02 m
2014	Asian Games	Incheon, South Korea	2nd	Shot put	17.80 m
2015	World Championships	Beijing, China	18th (q)	Shot put	17.04 m
2016	Asian Indoor Championships	Doha, Qatar	4th	Shot put	16.02 m
2016	Olympic Games	Rio de Janeiro, Brazil	32nd (q)	Shot put	16.34 m
