= Liu Xiangrong =

Chinese shot putter (born 1988)

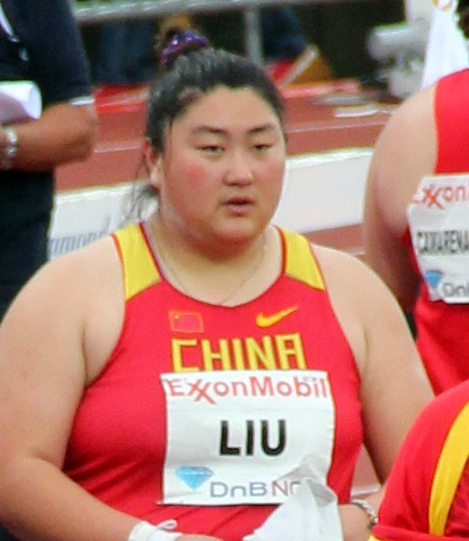
- Xiangrong in 2011

Personal information
- Born: June 6, 1988 (age 38)
- Height: 1.85 m (6 ft 1 in)
- Weight: 118 kg (260 lb)

Sport
- Country: China
- Sport: Athletics
- Event: Shot put
- Coached by: Sun Yougao
Medal record
Women's athletics
Representing China
Asian Championships
Gold medal – first place	2007 Amman	Shot put
Asian Indoor Championships
Gold medal – first place	2012 Hangzhou	Shot put

Liu Xiangrong (born June 6, 1988, Nei Mongol) is a Chinese shot putter. Her personal best is 19.24 m set in 2012. She represented China at the 2012 Summer Olympics and the 2009, 2011 and 2013 World Championships.

She failed an out-of-competition drug test on 20 August 2017 and was banned from the sport for two years, lasting until 11 September 2019.

== Achievements ==
Year	Competition	Venue	Position	Notes
Representing China
2007	Asian Championships	Amman, Jordan	1st	17.65 m
2009	World Championships	Berlin, Germany	10th	18.52 m
2009	Asian Championships	Guangzhou, China	2nd	17.55 m
2010	World Indoor Championships	Doha, Qatar	10th (q)	18.34 m
2011	Asian Championships	Kobe, Japan	2nd	18.30 m
2011	World Championships	Daegu, South Korea	17th (q)	18.22 m
2012	Asian Indoor Championships	Hangzhou, China	1st	18.37 m
2012	World Indoor Championships	Istanbul, Turkey	6th	18.63 m
2012	Olympic Games	London, United Kingdom	6th	19.18 m
2013	Asian Championships	Pune, India	1st	18.67 m
2013	Universiade	Kazan, Russia	2nd	18.58 m
2013	World Championships	Moscow, Russia	10th	18.04 m
2013	East Asian Games	Tianjin, China	1st	18.40 m

== See also ==
- List of doping cases in athletics
