= Li Fengfeng =

Chinese shot putter (born 1979)

Medal record

Women's athletics

Representing China

Asian Championships
Silver medal – second place	2003 Manila	Shot put

Li Fengfeng (simplified Chinese: 李凤峰; traditional Chinese: 李鳳峰; pinyin: Lǐ Fèngfēng; born January 18, 1979) is a Chinese shot putter. Her personal best throw is 19.13 metres, achieved in October 2006 in Changsha.

Li won the silver medal at the 2003 Asian Championships and the gold medal at the 2003 Summer Universiade. She also competed at the 2004 World Indoor Championships and the 2004 Olympic Games without reaching the final.

== Achievements ==
Year	Competition	Venue	Position	Notes
Representing China
2003	Universiade	Daegu, South Korea	1st	18.55 m
2003	Asian Championships	Manila, Philippines	2nd	18.07 m
2003	Afro-Asian Games	Hyderabad, India	2nd	17.21 m
2004	World Indoor Championships	Budapest, Hungary	16th (q)	17.16 m
2004	Olympic Games	Athens, Greece	23rd (q)	16.90 m
2007	Asian Indoor Games	Macau	1st	16.33 m
