= Athletics at the 2002 Asian Games – Women's shot put =

Women's shot put at the 2002 Asian Games
- Venue: Busan Asiad Main Stadium
- Date: 9 October 2002
- Competitors: 8 from 5 nations

Medalists
gold medal	Li Meiju	China
silver medal	Lee Myung-sun	South Korea
bronze medal	Juttaporn Krasaeyan	Thailand

The women's shot put competition at the 2002 Asian Games in Busan, South Korea was held on 9 October at the Busan Asiad Main Stadium.

== Schedule ==
All times are Korea Standard Time (UTC+09:00)

Date	Time	Event
Wednesday, 9 October 2002	15:00	Final

== Records ==
Prior to this competition, the existing world, Asian and Games records were as follows.

World Record	Natalya Lisovskaya (URS)	22.63	Moscow, Soviet Union	7 June 1987
Asian Record	Li Meisu (CHN)	21.76	Shijiazhuang, China	23 April 1988
Games Record	Sui Xinmei (CHN)	20.55	Beijing, China	1 October 1990

== Results ==
Rank	Athlete	Attempt						Result	Notes
Rank	Athlete	1	2	3	4	5	6	Result	Notes
1st place, gold medalist(s)	Li Meiju (CHN)	18.27	18.62	18.47	18.26	18.50	18.40	18.62	
2nd place, silver medalist(s)	Lee Myung-sun (KOR)	16.85	18.15	X	18.15	18.50	X	18.50	
3rd place, bronze medalist(s)	Juttaporn Krasaeyan (THA)	16.95	17.16	17.36	X	17.53	17.12	17.53	
4	Song Feina (CHN)	16.16	16.23	16.84	17.01	17.07	X	17.07	
5	Chinatsu Mori (JPN)	16.01	16.39	X	16.11	16.26	16.93	16.93	
6	Yoko Toyonaga (JPN)	16.77	16.24	16.79	16.90	16.75	16.90	16.90	
7	Lee Mi-young (KOR)	X	15.73	X	15.29	X	15.80	15.80	
8	Parisa Behzadi (IRI)	11.34	12.47	12.62	12.25	12.96	12.76	12.96	
