= Li Meiju =

Chinese shot putter (born 1979)

Medal record

Women's athletics

Representing China

Asian Championships
Gold medal – first place	2003 Manila	Shot put
Gold medal – first place	2005 Incheon	Shot put

Li Meiju (Chinese: 李梅菊; pinyin: Lǐ Méijú, born October 3, 1979, in Shijiazhuang, Hebei Province) is a Chinese shot putter.

Her personal best put is 19.19 metres, achieved in the qualifying round of the 2008 Olympic Games in Beijing.

== Competition record ==
Year	Competition	Venue	Position	Notes
Representing China
1999	Asian Junior Championships	Singapore	1st	16.45 m
2000	World Junior Championships	Santiago, Chile	2nd	16.57 m
2002	Asian Games	Busan, South Korea	1st	18.62 m
2003	World Indoor Championships	Birmingham, United Kingdom	10th (q)	18.13 m
2003	World Championships	Paris, France	11th	17.92 m
2003	Asian Championships	Manila, Philippines	1st	18.45 m
2003	Afro-Asian Games	Hyderabad, India	1st	17.61 m
2004	World Indoor Championships	Budapest, Hungary	5th	18.69 m
2004	Olympic Games	Olympia, Greece	8th	18.37 m
2005	World Championships	Helsinki, Finland	5th	18.35 m
2005	Universiade	İzmir, Turkey	2nd	18.48 m
2005	Asian Championships	Manila, Philippines	1st	18.64 m
2005	East Asian Games	Macau	1st	18.12 m
2006	Asian Games	Doha, Qatar	2nd	18.08 m
2007	World Championships	Osaka, Japan	6th	18.83 m
2008	World Indoor Championships	Valencia, Spain	2nd	19.09 m
2008	Olympic Games	Beijing, China	8th	19.00 m
2009	World Championships	Berlin, Germany	7th	18.76 m
2009	East Asian Games	Hong Kong	2nd	16.74 m
