= 2013 Asian Athletics Championships – Women's shot put =

The women's shot put at the 2013 Asian Athletics Championships was held at the Shree Shiv Chhatrapati Sports Complex on 6 July.

== Results ==
Rank	Name	Nationality	#1	#2	#3	#4	#5	#6	Result	Notes
1st place, gold medalist(s)	Liu Xiangrong	China	18.39	18.45	18.27	18.59	18.18	18.67	18.67	
2nd place, silver medalist(s)	Leyla Rajabi	Iran	17.78	18.18	17.65	17.52	17.33	17.66	18.18	
3rd place, bronze medalist(s)	Gao Yang	China	17.76	17.22	x	17.36	16.99	17.45	17.76	
4	Lee Mi-Young	South Korea	x	16.74	x	16.37	x	x	16.74	
5	Sofiya Burhanova	Uzbekistan	16.19	15.78	16.20	15.87	16.49	15.66	16.49	
6	Lin Chia-ying	Chinese Taipei	16.37	x	16.47	16.36	16.23	16.11	16.47	
7	Yukiko Shirai	Japan	13.81	14.72	14.78	14.30	14.57	14.11	14.78	
8	Neha Singh	India	13.50	13.71	13.12	13.08	x	13.73	13.73	
9	Navjeet Kaur Dhillon	India	12.77	12.16	12.91				12.91	
