= Chinatsu Mori =

Japanese shot putter

Medal record

Women's athletics

Representing Japan

Asian Championships
Silver medal – second place	2000 Jakarta	Shot put
Bronze medal – third place	2003 Manila	Shot put

Chinatsu Mori (森 千夏, Mori Chinatsu) (May 20, 1980 in Edogawa, Tokyo – August 9, 2006 in Tokyo) was a Japanese shot putter. Her personal best throw is 18.22 metres, achieved in April 2004 in Hamamatsu. This is the current Japanese record.

She won the silver medal at the 2000 Asian Championships and the bronze medal at the 2003 Asian Championships. In addition she competed at the 2003 World Championships and the 2004 Olympic Games without reaching the final round. Mori died of appendix cancer on August 9, 2006, aged 26.

== International competitions ==
Representing Japan
Year	Competition	Venue	Position	Notes
1999	Asian Junior Championships	Singapore	3rd	15.06 m
2000	Asian Championships	Jakarta, Indonesia	2nd	16.38 m
2002	Asian Games	Busan, South Korea	5th	16.93 m
2003	World Championships	Paris, France	20th (q)	16.86 m
2003	Asian Championships	Manila, Philippines	3rd	17.80 m
2004	Olympic Games	Athens, Greece	31st	15.86 m
