= Li Ling (shot putter) =

Chinese shot putter (born 1985)

Personal information
- Born: February 7, 1985 (age 41)
- Height: 1.81 m (5 ft 11 1/2 in)
- Weight: 110 kg (243 lb)

Sport
- Country: China
- Sport: Women's athletics
- Event: Shot put
- Coached by: Cong Yuzhen; Kirsten Hellier
Medal record
Women's athletics
Representing China
Olympic Games
Bronze medal – third place	2012 London	Shot put
World Championships
Bronze medal – third place	2007 Osaka	Shot put
Asian Games
Gold medal – first place	2006 Doha	Shot put
Gold medal – first place	2010 Guangzhou	Shot put
Asian Championships
Bronze medal – third place	2005 Incheon	Shot put

Li Ling (Chinese: 李玲; pinyin: Lǐ Líng; born 7 February 1985) is a Chinese shot putter. Her personal best throw is 19.95 metres, set in Wiesbaden.

She initially finished fifth at the 2012 Summer Olympics in London, but was retroactively ranked third after Evgeniia Kolodko and the winner, Nadzeya Ostapchuk, was disqualified for failing a drug test. On 20 August 2016, the IOC announced Yevgeniya Kolodko, the Russian silver medalist of women's shot put at the 2012 Summer Olympics, failed anti-doping test, Li was thus awarded the Bronze medal.

== International competitions ==
Year	Competition	Venue	Position	Notes
Representing China
2004	Asian Junior Championships	Ipoh, Malaysia	1st	16.08 m
2005	Asian Championships	Incheon, South Korea	3rd	18.04 m
2005	Asian Indoor Games	Bangkok, Thailand	1st	18.20 m
2006	World Indoor Championships	Moscow, Russia	13th (q)	16.94 m
2006	World Cup	Athens, Greece	5th	19.05 m
2006	Asian Games	Doha, Qatar	1st	18.42 m
2007	World Championships	Osaka, Japan	3rd	19.38 m
2008	World Indoor Championships	Valencia, Spain	13th (q)	17.76 m
2008	Olympic Games	Beijing, China	14th	17.94 m
2009	East Asian Games	Hong Kong, China	1st	17.95 m
2010	Asian Games	Guangzhou, China	1st	19.94 m
2011	World Championships	Daegu, South Korea	4th	19.71 m
2012	Olympic Games	London, United Kingdom	3rd	19.63 m
2013	World Championships	Moscow, Russia	6th	18.39 m
