= Maryna Shkermankova =

Belarusian weightlifter

Maryna Ivanauna Shkermankova (Belarusian: Марына Іванаўна Шкерманкова; born 9 April 1990 in Hlybokaye, Belarus) is a weightlifter representing Belarus. She initially won the bronze medal at the 2012 Summer Olympics in the – 69 kg category. In 2016, she was stripped of her Olympic medal after retests of her drug sample tested positive for the steroids stanozolol and turinabol.
