= Roxana Cocoș =

Romanian weightlifter (born 1989)

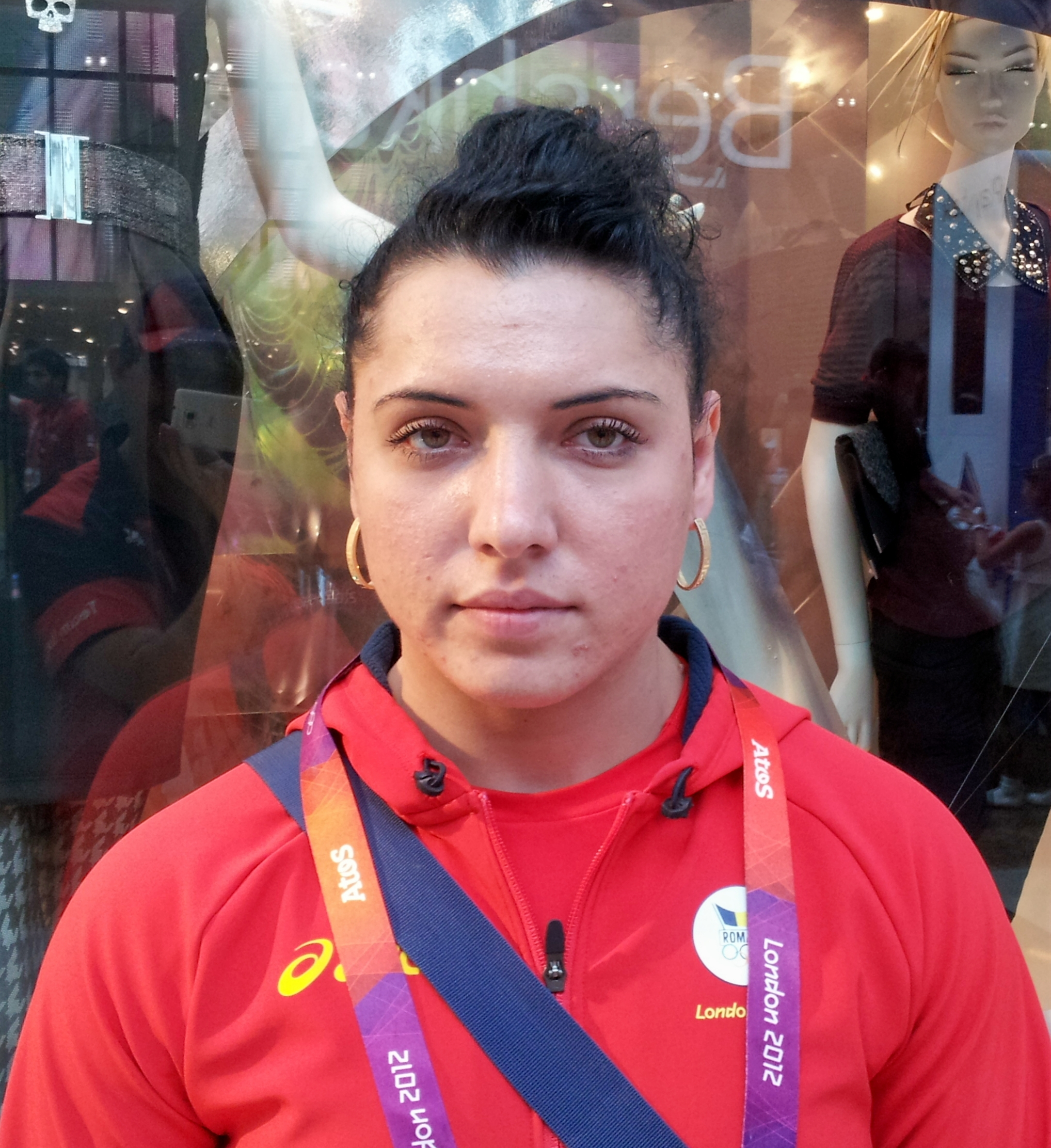
- Roxana Cocoș at the 2012 London Summer Olympics

Personal information
- Full name: Roxana Daniela Cocoș
- Born: 5 June 1989 (age 37) Bucharest, Romania
- Height: 1.58 m (5 ft 2 in)
- Weight: 68 kg (150 lb; 10.7 st)

Sport
- Sport: Weightlifting
- Club: CSA Steaua București
- Coached by: Fitzi Balaș
Medal record
Women's Weightlifting
Representing Romania
Olympic Games
Disqualified	2012 London	–69 kg
European Championships
Disqualified	2012 Antalya	–69 kg
Disqualified	2010 Minsk	–63 kg

Roxana Cocoș (Romanian pronunciation: [rokˈsana koˈkoʃ]; born 5 June 1989 in Bucharest) is a Romanian weightlifter.

On 1 August 2012, Cocoș won the silver medal at the 2012 Summer Olympics in the –69 kg category with a snatch of 113 kg and a clean and jerk of 143 kg, giving a total of 256 kg. She had previously finished in 7th in the -58 kg category at the 2008 Summer Olympics, with a snatch of 89 kg and a clean and jerk of 115 kg, giving a total of 204 kg.

On 25 November 2020, the reanalysed doping tests from the 2012 Summer Olympics turned out positive for metenolone and stanozolol, and she was stripped of the medal. In June 2021, a report by the International Testing Agency on doping violations between 2009 and 2019 reviewed her case and concluded that there are "strong reasons to think" the International Weightlifting Federation (IWF) was aware of urine samples being swapped by weightlifters and that president of the IWF Tamás Aján and IWF vice-president Nicu Vlad allowed her to compete at the 2012 Summer Olympics believing that they could hide her use of a banned substance. Aján and Vlad have been charged with anti-doping rule violations.

In 2022 the International Weightlifting Federation annulled her results from between 20 July 2010 and 10 February 2020 and banned her from the sport for life
