= Weightlifting at the 2012 Summer Olympics – Women's 69 kg =

Women's 69 kg at the Games of the XXX Olympiad
- Venue: ExCeL London
- Date: 1 August 2012
- Competitors: 15 from 14 nations

Medalists
1st place, gold medalist(s)		Rim Jong-sim	North Korea
2nd place, silver medalist(s)		vacant	
3rd place, bronze medalist(s)		Anna Nurmukhambetova	Kazakhstan
3rd place, bronze medalist(s)		Ubaldina Valoyes	Colombia

The Women's 69 kilograms weightlifting event at the 2012 Summer Olympics in London, United Kingdom, took place at ExCeL London.

== Summary ==
Total score was the sum of the lifter's best result in each of the snatch and the clean and jerk, with three lifts allowed for each lift. In case of a tie, the lighter lifter won; if still tied, the lifter who took the fewest attempts to achieve the total score won. Lifters without a valid snatch score did not perform the clean and jerk.

Maryna Shkermankova of Belarus originally won the bronze medal, but was disqualified in 2016 after a retest of her 2012 sample was positive for steroids, fourth-placed Dzina Sazanavets of Belarus was also disqualified for the same reason. Kazakh lifter Anna Nurmukhambetova was upgraded to the bronze medal. However, in November 2020, London sample re-tests revealed an anti-doping violation by Romania's silver medalist, Roxana Cocoș, leading to her disqualification and the removal of her medal. In June 2021, Colombia’s Ubaldina Valoyes was bumped up to third place to receive a bronze medal. Because Nurmukhambetova was already serving a suspension for performance-enhancing drugs at that time, she was denied an upgrade to the silver medal, resulting in two bronze medals being awarded for the event (as of June 2021).

== Schedule ==
All times are British Summer Time (UTC+01:00)

Date	Time	Event
1 August 2012	12:30	Group B
1 August 2012	15:30	Group A

== Records ==
{{{caption}}}
World Record	Snatch	~~Liu Chunhong (CHN)~~; Oxana Slivenko (RUS)	~~128 kg~~ 123 kg	~~Beijing, China~~; Santo Domingo, Dominican	~~13 August 2008~~; 4 October 2006
World Record	Clean & Jerk	~~Liu Chunhong (CHN)~~; Zarema Kasaeva (RUS)	~~158 kg~~ 157 kg	~~Beijing, China~~; Doha, Qatar	~~13 August 2008~~; 13 November 2005
World Record	Total	~~Liu Chunhong (CHN)~~; Oxana Slivenko (RUS)	~~286 kg~~ 276 kg	~~Beijing, China~~; Chiang Mai, Thailand	~~13 August 2008~~; 24 September 2007
Olympic Record	Snatch	~~Liu Chunhong (CHN)~~; Liu Chunhong (CHN)	~~128 kg~~ 122 kg	~~Beijing, China~~; Athens, Greece	~~13 August 2008~~; 19 August 2004
Olympic Record	Clean & Jerk	~~Liu Chunhong (CHN)~~; Liu Chunhong (CHN)	~~158 kg~~ 153 kg	~~Beijing, China~~; Athens, Greece	~~13 August 2008~~; 19 August 2004
Olympic Record	Total	~~Liu Chunhong (CHN)~~; Liu Chunhong (CHN)	~~286 kg~~ 275 kg	~~Beijing, China~~; Athens, Greece	~~13 August 2008~~; 19 August 2004

- Liu Chunhong's world and Olympic records from the year 2008 were rescinded in 2017.

== Results ==
Rank	Athlete	Group	Body weight	Snatch (kg)				Clean & Jerk (kg)				Total
Rank	Athlete	Group	Body weight	1	2	3	Result	1	2	3	Result	Total
1st place, gold medalist(s)	Rim Jong-sim (PRK)	A	68.22	111	115	~~117~~	115	142	~~146~~	146	146	261
3rd place, bronze medalist(s)	Anna Nurmukhambetova (KAZ)	A	68.71	110	115	~~117~~	115	136	~~140~~	~~140~~	136	251
3rd place, bronze medalist(s)	Ubaldina Valoyes (COL)	A	68.98	108	111	~~113~~	111	130	~~135~~	135	135	246
4	Huang Shih-hsu (TPE)	A	68.45	110	~~115~~	~~115~~	110	~~130~~	130	131	131	241
5	Marie-Ève Beauchemin-Nadeau (CAN)	B	68.92	~~100~~	100	104	104	130	~~134~~	135	135	239
6	Esmat Mansour (EGY)	A	68.42	~~105~~	105	~~108~~	105	~~130~~	130	~~134~~	130	235
7	Ghada Hassine (TUN)	B	68.64	97	~~101~~	102	102	115	120	~~125~~	120	222
8	Rosa Tenorio (ECU)	B	68.72	~~95~~	95	~~100~~	95	~~115~~	115	~~120~~	115	210
9	Natasha Perdue (GBR)	B	67.98	~~92~~	92	~~95~~	92	113	—	—	113	205
10	Mercy Obiero (KEN)	B	67.85	72	~~76~~	76	76	100	105	~~111~~	105	181
—	Mun Yu-ra (KOR)	B	68.56	~~102~~	~~102~~	~~102~~	—	—	—	—	—	—
DQ	Roxana Cocoș (ROU)	A	68.00	108	111	113	113	138	143	~~146~~	143	~~256~~
DQ	Maryna Shkermankova (BLR)	A	68.21	108	113	~~117~~	113	135	140	143	143	~~256~~
DQ	Dzina Sazanavets (BLR)	A	68.49	108	113	115	115	~~136~~	136	141	141	~~256~~
DQ	Meline Daluzyan (ARM)	A	68.65	111	~~115~~	~~115~~	111	~~140~~	~~140~~	~~142~~	—	—
