= Anna Nurmukhambetova =

Kazakhstani weightlifter

Personal information
- Native name: Анна Сагтановна Нурмухамбетова
- Full name: Anna Sagtanovna Nurmukhambetova
- Born: 28 July 1993 (age 32) Kokshetau, Kazakhstan

Sport
- Country: Kazakhstan
- Sport: Weightlifting
Medal record
Women's weightlifting
Representing Kazakhstan
Olympic Games
Silver medal – second place	2012 London	– 69 kg

Anna Sagtanovna Nurmukhambetova (Kazakh: Анна Сагтановна Нурмухамбетова, born 28 July 1993 in Kokshetau) is a Kazakhstani weightlifter representing Kazakhstan. She originally finished fifth in the 69kg event at the 2012 Summer Olympics, but was later upgraded to silver after disqualifications. Due to the fact that she is currently suspended for an Anti-Doping Rule Violation she is not eligible to receive her reallocated silver medal until September 17, 2023.
