= 1982 European Athletics Championships – Women's discus throw =

1982 athletic event

Women's discus throw at the European Athletics Championships

These are the official results of the Women's Discus Throw event at the 1982 European Championships in Athens, Greece. The final was held at the Olympic Stadium "Spiros Louis" on 8 September 1982.

== Medalists ==
Gold	Tsvetanka Khristova; Bulgaria
Silver	Mariya Petkova; Bulgaria
Bronze	Galina Yermakova; Soviet Union

== Results ==
=== Final ===
8 September

Rank	Name	Nationality	Result	Notes
1st place, gold medalist(s)	Tsvetanka Khristova	Bulgaria	68.34	
2nd place, silver medalist(s)	Mariya Petkova	Bulgaria	67.94	
3rd place, bronze medalist(s)	Galina Yermakova	Soviet Union	67.82	
4	Gisela Beyer	East Germany	66.78	
5	Silvia Madetzky	East Germany	66.64	
6	Galina Murašova	Soviet Union	65.30	
7	Florența Crăciunescu	Romania	64.00	
8	Irina Meszynski	East Germany	63.78	
9	Svetla Bozhkova	Bulgaria	60.78	
10	Ingra Manecke	West Germany	60.46	
11	Ulla Lundholm	Finland	58.90	
12	Ria Stalman	Netherlands	58.48	
13	Zdeňka Šilhavá	Czechoslovakia	56.16	
14	Isabelle Accambray	France	53.06	
15	Patricia Walsh	Ireland	52.78	
16	Gunnel Hettman	Sweden	44.00	

== Participation ==
According to an unofficial count, 16 athletes from 11 countries participated in the event.

- Bulgaria (3)
- Czechoslovakia (1)
- East Germany (3)
- Finland (1)
- France (1)
- Ireland (1)
- Netherlands (1)
- Romania (1)
- Soviet Union (2)
- Sweden (1)
- West Germany (1)

== See also ==
- 1980 Women's Olympic Discus Throw (Moscow)
- 1983 Women's World Championships Discus Throw (Helsinki)
- 1984 Women's Olympic Discus Throw (Los Angeles)
- 1987 Women's World Championships Discus Throw (Rome)
- 1988 Women's Olympic Discus Throw (Seoul)
