= Athletics at the 1980 Summer Olympics – Women's discus throw =

Women's discus throw at the Games of the XXII Olympiad
- Pictogram for athletics
- Venue: Lenin Central Stadium
- Date: 31 July 1980 (qualifications); 1 August 1980 (finals)
- Competitors: 18 from 11 nations
- Winning distance: 69.96

Medalists
1st place, gold medalist(s)		Evelin Jahl; East Germany
2nd place, silver medalist(s)		Mariya Petkova; Bulgaria
3rd place, bronze medalist(s)		Tatyana Lesovaya; Soviet Union

The Women's Discus Throw event at the 1980 Summer Olympics in Moscow, Soviet Union had an entry list of 18 competitors, with one qualifying group and the final (12) held on Friday 1980-08-01.

== Medalists ==
Gold	Evelin Jahl; East Germany
Silver	Mariya Petkova; Bulgaria
Bronze	Tatyana Lesovaya; Soviet Union

== Records ==
Standing records prior to the 1980 Summer Olympics
World record	Mariya Petkova (BUL)	71.80 m	July 13, 1980	Sofia, Bulgaria
Olympic record	Evelin Schlaak (GDR)	69.00 m	July 29, 1976	Montreal, Quebec, Canada
Broken records during the 1980 Summer Olympics
Olympic record	Evelin Jahl (GDR)	69.96 m	August 1, 1980	Moscow, Soviet Union

== Results ==
=== Final ===
RANK	FINAL	DISTANCE
	Evelin Jahl (GDR)	69.96 m
	Mariya Petkova (BUL)	67.90 m
	Tatyana Lesovaya (URS)	67.40 m
4.	Gisela Beyer (GDR)	67.08 m
5.	Margitta Pufe (GDR)	66.12 m
6.	Florenţa Ţacu (ROU)	64.38 m
7.	Galina Murašova (URS)	63.84 m
8.	Svetla Bozhkova (BUL)	63.14 m
9.	Meg Ritchie (GBR)	61.16 m
10.	Carmen Romero (CUB)	60.86 m
11.	Zdena Bartoňová (TCH)	57.78 m
12.	Ágnes Herczegh (HUN)	55.06 m

== Qualifying round ==
- Held on Thursday July 31, 1980

RANK	FINAL	DISTANCE
1.	Margitta Pufe (GDR)	65.52 m
2.	Mariya Petkova (BUL)	65.02 m
3.	Gisela Beyer (GDR)	62.86 m
4.	Tatyana Lesovaya (URS)	62.20 m
5.	Svetla Bozhkova (BUL)	60.84 m
6.	Florenţa Ţacu (ROU)	60.40 m
7.	Galina Murašova (URS)	60.32 m
8.	Evelin Jahl (GDR)	60.22 m
9.	Zdena Bartoňová (TCH)	59.48 m
10.	Meg Ritchie (GBR)	58.66 m
11.	Carmen Romero (CUB)	58.60 m
12.	Ágnes Herczegh (HUN)	57.80 m
13.	María Cristina Betancourt (CUB)	57.62 m
14.	Katalin Csőke (HUN)	57.38 m
15.	Gael Mulhall (AUS)	54.90 m
16.	Faina Melnik (URS)	53.76 m
—	Ludovina de Oliveira (MOZ)	NM
—	Ulla Lundholm (FIN)	DNS

== See also ==
- 1976 Women's Olympic Discus Throw (Montreal)
- 1978 Women's European Championships Discus Throw (Prague)
- 1982 Women's European Championships Discus Throw (Athens)
- 1983 Women's World Championships Discus Throw (Helsinki)
- 1984 Women's Olympic Discus Throw (Los Angeles)
- 1986 Women's European Championships Discus Throw (Stuttgart)
- 1987 Women's World Championships Discus Throw (Rome)
