= Athletics at the Friendship Games – Women's discus throw =

The women's discus throw event at the Friendship Games was held on 17 August 1984 at the Evžen Rošický Stadium in Prague, Czechoslovakia.

== Results ==
| Rank | Name | Nationality | #1 | #2 | #3 | #4 | #5 | #6 | Result | Notes |
|---|---|---|---|---|---|---|---|---|---|---|
| 1st place, gold medalist(s) | Irina Meszynski | East Germany | 70.46 | 68.14 | 73.36 | 71.10 | 66.02 | 71.34 | 73.36 | WR |
| 2nd place, silver medalist(s) | Galina Murashova | Soviet Union | 70.46 | x | 71.32 | 69.36 | 72.14 | 69.42 | 72.14 | PB |
| 3rd place, bronze medalist(s) | Zdeňka Šilhavá | Czechoslovakia | 70.14 | 68.94 | x | x | 65.64 | x | 70.14 | |
| 4 | Galina Savinkova | Soviet Union | | | | | | | 68.90 | |
| 5 | Ellina Zvereva | Soviet Union | | | | | | | 67.32 | |
| 6 | Gisela Beyer | East Germany | | | | | | | 66.26 | |
| 7 | Tsvetanka Khristova | Bulgaria | | | | | | | 66.06 | |
| 8 | Mariya Petkova | Bulgaria | | | | | | | 64.90 | |
| 9 | Gabriela Hanuláková | Czechoslovakia | | | | | | | 62.34 | |
| 10 | Diana Sachse | East Germany | | | | | | | 61.64 | |
| 11 | Hilda Ramos | Cuba | | | | | | | 59.30 | |
| 12 | Jitka Prouzová | Czechoslovakia | | | | | | | 57.50 | |
| 13 | Maria Schramseis | Austria | | | | | | | 48.06 | |
| | Maritza Martén | Cuba | x | x | x | | | | NM | |

== See also ==
- Athletics at the 1984 Summer Olympics – Women's discus throw
