= Athletics at the 1981 Summer Universiade – Women's discus throw =

The women's discus throw event at the 1981 Summer Universiade was held at the Stadionul Naţional in Bucharest on 24 July 1981.

== Results ==
Rank	Athlete	Nationality	Result	Notes
1st place, gold medalist(s)	Florenţa Crăciunescu	Romania	67.48	UR
2nd place, silver medalist(s)	Petra Sziegaud	East Germany	64.14	
3rd place, bronze medalist(s)	Mariana Ionescu	Romania	61.84	
4	Ute Rekeschat	East Germany	60.92	
5	Tzvtanka Hristova	Bulgaria	60.52	
6	Tatyana Lesovaya	Soviet Union	60.18	
7	Galina Murašova	Soviet Union	58.18	
8	Jiao Yunxiang	China	54.60	
9	Sinikka Salminen	Finland	50.50	
10	Julia Hansen	United States	50.26	
11	Maristella Bano	Italy	48.60	
12	Grace Apiafi	Nigeria	36.12	
