= Athletics at the 1979 Summer Universiade – Women's discus throw =

The women's discus throw event at the 1979 Summer Universiade was held at the Estadio Olimpico Universitario in Mexico City on 11 September 1979.

== Results ==
Rank	Athlete	Nationality	Result	Notes
1st place, gold medalist(s)	Svetlana Melnikova	Soviet Union	63.54	
2nd place, silver medalist(s)	Evelin Jahl	East Germany	63.00	
3rd place, bronze medalist(s)	Florenţa Ţacu	Romania	59.28	
4	Nadezhda Yerokha	Soviet Union	58.94	
5	Ingra Manecke	West Germany	57.34	
6	Salvadora Vargas	Cuba	53.92	
7	Jiao Yunxiang	China	53.64	
8	Salminen Sidikka	Finland	49.26	
9	Lorna Griffin	United States	48.52	
10	Maristella Bano	Italy	47.18	
11	Laura Aguiñaga	Mexico	39.52	
