= Athletics at the 1984 Summer Olympics – Women's discus throw =

Women's discus throw at the Games of the XXIII Olympiad
- Pictogram for athletics
- Venue: Los Angeles Memorial Coliseum
- Date: 10 August 1984 (qualifications); 11 August 1984 (finals)
- Competitors: 17 from 14 nations
- Winning distance: 65.36

Medalists
1st place, gold medalist(s)		Ria Stalman; Netherlands
2nd place, silver medalist(s)		Leslie Deniz; United States
3rd place, bronze medalist(s)		Florenţa Crăciunescu; Romania

The Women's Discus Throw at the 1984 Summer Olympics in Los Angeles, California had an entry list of 17 competitors, with two qualifying groups before the final (12) took place on August 11, 1984.

== Medalists ==
Gold	Ria Stalman; Netherlands
Silver	Leslie Deniz; United States
Bronze	Florența Crăciunescu; Romania

== Abbreviations ==
Q	automatic qualification
q	qualification by rank
DNS	did not start
NM	no mark
OR	olympic record
WR	world record
AR	area record
NR	national record
PB	personal best
SB	season best

== Records ==
Standing records prior to the 1984 Summer Olympics
World Record	Galina Savinkova (URS)	73.26 m	May 22, 1983	Leselidze, Soviet Union
Olympic Record	Evelin Schlaak (GDR)	69.96 m	August 1, 1980	Moscow, Soviet Union

== Qualifying round ==
- Held on 1984-08-10

RANK	GROUP A	DISTANCE
1.	Ria Stalman (NED)	58.28m
2.	Florenţa Crăciunescu (ROU)	57.84m
3.	Ulla Lundholm (FIN)	56.44m
4.	Leslie Deniz (USA)	56.24m
5.	Gael Martin (AUS)	55.38m
6.	Venissa Head (GBR)	55.24m
7.	Jiao Yunxiang (CHN)	54.70m
8.	Mariette Van Heerden (ZIM)	50.54m
9.	Marlene Lewis (JAM)	49.00m

RANK	GROUP B	DISTANCE
1.	Ingra Manecke (FRG)	56.20m
2.	Meg Ritchie (GBR)	56.00m
3.	Patricia Walsh (IRL)	54.42m
4.	Laura De Snoo (USA)	53.76m
5.	Lorna Griffin (USA)	53.34m
6.	Carmen Ionesco (CAN)	52.28m
7.	Agathe Ngo Nack (CMR)	38.32m
8.	Christine Bechard (MRI)	37.94m

== Final ==
Rank	Athlete	Attempts						Distance	Note
Rank	Athlete	1	2	3	4	5	6	Distance	Note
1st place, gold medalist(s)	Ria Stalman (NED)	64.50	61.16	63.70	64.28	63.64	65.36	65.36 m	
2nd place, silver medalist(s)	Leslie Deniz (USA)	62.46	X	63.36	62.60	64.86	X	64.86 m	
3rd place, bronze medalist(s)	Florența Crăciunescu (ROU)	60.68	61.42	62.96	62.08	63.64	X	63.64 m	
4	Ulla Lundholm (FIN)	62.84	X	54.92	55.94	59.72	54.04	62.84 m	
5	Meg Ritchie (GBR)	X	55.36	57.66	61.76	62.58	60.40	62.58 m	
6	Ingra Manecke (FRG)	51.66	56.22	X	53.20	X	58.56	58.56 m	
7	Venissa Head (GBR)	X	55.56	58.18	X	55.84	55.88	58.18 m	
8	Gael Martin (AUS)	55.88	55.38	54.34	54.94	55.70	53.08	55.88 m	
9	Patricia Walsh (IRL)	55.38	51.70	53.32				55.38 m	
10	Laura De Snoo (USA)	53.74	54.84	53.88				54.84 m	
11	Jiao Yunxiang (CHN)	X	53.32	X				53.32 m	
12	Lorna Griffin (USA)	X	50.16	X				50.16 m	

== See also ==
- 1982 Women's European Championships Discus Throw (Athens)
- 1983 Women's World Championships Discus Throw (Helsinki)
- 1984 Women's Friendship Games Discus Throw (Prague)
- 1986 Women's European Championships Discus Throw (Stuttgart)
- 1987 Women's World Championships Discus Throw (Rome)
