= 1986 European Athletics Championships – Women's discus throw =

Women's discus throw at the European Athletics Championships

These are the official results of the Women's discus throw event at the 1986 European Championships in Stuttgart, West Germany, held at Neckarstadion on 28 August 1986.

== Medalists ==
Gold	Diana Sachse; East Germany
Silver	Tsvetanka Khristova; Bulgaria
Bronze	Martina Hellmann; East Germany

== Final ==
Rank	Final	Distance
	Diana Sachse (GDR)	71.36 m
	Tsvetanka Khristova (BUL)	69.52 m
	Martina Hellmann (GDR)	68.26 m
4.	Irina Meszynski (GDR)	65.20 m
5.	Svetla Mitkova (BUL)	63.98 m
6.	Galina Yermakova (URS)	63.20 m
7.	Daniela Costian (ROU)	61.42 m
8.	Renata Katewicz (POL)	58.36 m
9.	Claudia Losch (FRG)	56.54 m
10.	Stephanie Storp (FRG)	56.46 m
11.	Mette Bergmann (NOR)	53.58 m
12.	Venissa Head (GBR)	52.04 m
13.	Snežana Golubić (YUG)	48.80 m
14.	Ursula Weber (AUT)	45.58 m

== Participation ==
According to an unofficial count, 14 athletes from 10 countries participated in the event.

- Austria (1)
- Bulgaria (2)
- East Germany (3)
- Norway (1)
- Poland (1)
- Romania (1)
- Soviet Union (1)
- United Kingdom (1)
- West Germany (2)
- Yugoslavia (1)

== See also ==
- 1982 Women's European Championships Discus Throw (Athens)
- 1983 Women's World Championships Discus Throw (Helsinki)
- 1984 Women's Olympic Discus Throw (Los Angeles)
- 1987 Women's World Championships Discus Throw (Rome)
- 1988 Women's Olympic Discus Throw (Seoul)
- 1990 Women's European Championships Discus Throw (Split)
