= 1978 European Athletics Championships – Women's discus throw =

Women's discus throw at the European Athletics Championships

The women's discus throw at the 1978 European Athletics Championships was held in Prague, then Czechoslovakia, at Stadion Evžena Rošického on 31 August 1978.

== Medalists ==
Gold	Evelin Jahl; East Germany
Silver	Margitta Droese; East Germany
Bronze	Natalya Gorbachova; Soviet Union

== Results ==
=== Final ===
31 August

Rank	Name	Nationality	Result	Notes
1st place, gold medalist(s)	Evelin Jahl	East Germany	66.98	
2nd place, silver medalist(s)	Margitta Droese	East Germany	64.04	
3rd place, bronze medalist(s)	Natalya Gorbachova	Soviet Union	63.58	
4	Sabine Engel	East Germany	63.46	
5	Faina Melnik	Soviet Union	62.30	
6	Svetla Bozhkova	Bulgaria	61.94	
7	Lyudmila Isayeva	Soviet Union	61.56	
8	Jitka Prouzová	Czechoslovakia	59.90	
9	Argentina Menis	Romania	58.36	
10	Agnes Herczeg	Hungary	57.94	
11	Rita Pfister	Switzerland	53.78	
12	Ingra Manecke	West Germany	52.92	
13	Meg Ritchie	Great Britain	52.64	
14	Marcela Pilařová	Czechoslovakia	50.34	

== Participation ==
According to an unofficial count, 14 athletes from 9 countries participated in the event.

- Bulgaria (1)
- Czechoslovakia (2)
- East Germany (3)
- Hungary (1)
- Romania (1)
- Soviet Union (3)
- Switzerland (1)
- Great Britain (1)
- West Germany (1)
