= 1983 World Championships in Athletics – Women's discus throw =

These are the official results of the Women's Discus Throw event at the 1983 World Championships in Helsinki, Finland. There were a total of 21 participating athletes, with the final held on Sunday August 14, 1983.

== Medalists ==
Gold	Martina Opitz; East Germany (GDR)
Silver	Galina Murašova; Soviet Union (URS)
Bronze	Mariya Petkova; Bulgaria (BUL)

== Schedule ==
- All times are Eastern European Time (UTC+2)

Qualification Round
Group A	Group B
09.08.1983 – ??:??h	09.08.1983 – ??:??h
Final Round
14.08.1983 – ??:??h

== Abbreviations ==
- All results shown are in metres

Q	automatic qualification
q	qualification by rank
DNS	did not start
NM	no mark
WR	world record
AR	area record
NR	national record
PB	personal best
SB	season best

== Records ==
Standing records prior to the 1983 World Athletics Championships
World Record	Galina Savinkova (URS)	73.26 m	May 22, 1983	Leselidze, Soviet Union
Event Record	New event			

== Qualification ==
=== Group A ===
Rank	Overall	Athlete	Attempts			Distance
Rank	Overall	Athlete	1	2	3	Distance
1	1	Mariya Petkova (BUL)	58.28	65.84	—	65.84 m
2	2	Zdeňka Šilhavá (TCH)	64.68	—	—	64.68 m
3	3	Martina Opitz (GDR)	64.66	—	—	64.66 m
4	5	Galina Murašova (URS)	64.00	—	—	64.00 m
5	9	Svetla Mitkova (BUL)	X	60.58	57.38	60.58 m
6	11	Meg Ritchie (GBR)	59.28	X	55.92	59.28 m
7	12	Maria Badea (ROU)	56.60	X	57.82	57.82 m
8	15	Anne Paavolainen (FIN)	50.54	50.72	54.92	54.92 m
9	16	Li Xiaohui (CHN)	52.92	51.62	54.58	54.58 m
10	20	Maryline Adam (VAN)	33.36	X	31.88	33.36 m

=== Group B ===
Rank	Overall	Athlete	Attempts			Distance
Rank	Overall	Athlete	1	2	3	Distance
1	4	Gisela Beyer (GDR)	64.14	—	—	64.14 m
2	6	Galina Savinkova (URS)	63.58	—	—	63.58 m
3	7	Florența Crăciunescu (ROU)	61.70	—	—	61.70 m
4	8	Tsvetanka Khristova (BUL)	55.24	61.50	—	61.50 m
5	10	Ria Stalman (NED)	X	60.16	—	60.16 m
6	13	Ulla Lundholm (FIN)	53.30	57.64	X	57.64 m
7	14	Carol Cady (USA)	X	57.34	X	57.34 m
8	17	Venissa Head (GBR)	53.78	51.16	X	53.78 m
9	18	Mariette Van Heerden (ZIM)	44.58	45.22	44.28	45.22 m
10	19	Mereoni Vibose (FIJ)	42.36	X	X	42.36 m
—	—	Juliet Cain (NRU)	X	X	X	NM

== Final ==
Rank	Athlete	Throws						Final
Rank	Athlete	1	2	3	4	5	6	Distance
1st place, gold medalist(s)	Martina Opitz (GDR)	X	66.42	67.76	67.22	68.74	68.94	68.94 m
2nd place, silver medalist(s)	Galina Murašova (URS)	X	64.82	65.96	64.80	X	67.44	67.44 m
3rd place, bronze medalist(s)	Mariya Petkova (BUL)	62.48	66.44	X	X	X	X	66.44 m
4.	Tsvetanka Khristova (BUL)	65.62	65.62	63.62	62.24	63.42	62.90	65.62 m
5.	Gisela Beyer (GDR)	X	65.06	65.00	X	63.84	65.26	65.26 m
6.	Zdeňka Šilhavá (TCH)	60.58	64.18	62.76	X	64.32	X	64.32 m
7.	Ria Stalman (NED)	61.48	63.76	62.42	59.50	63.20	62.92	63.76 m
8.	Meg Ritchie (GBR)	60.66	62.50	60.50	60.64	X	X	62.50 m
9.	Florența Crăciunescu (ROU)	55.56	X	62.14				62.14 m
10.	Svetla Mitkova (BUL)	56.50	62.06	57.44				62.06 m
11.	Galina Savinkova (URS)	X	X	59.28				59.28 m
12.	Maria Badea (ROU)	52.64	57.96	58.10				58.10 m

== See also ==
- 1980 Women's Olympic Discus Throw (Moscow)
- 1982 Women's European Championships Discus Throw (Athens)
- 1984 Women's Olympic Discus Throw (Los Angeles)
- 1986 Women's European Championships Discus Throw (Stuttgart)
