= Sabine Engel =

East German discus thrower

Sabine Engel (born 21 April 1954) is a retired East German discus thrower. She was born in Prenzlau, Bezirk Neubrandenburg.

Engel finished fifth at the 1976 Summer Olympics, third at the 1977 World Cup and fourth at the 1978 European Championships. She represented the sports team SC Neubrandenburg and became East German champion in 1975.

Her personal best throw was 68.92 metres, achieved in June 1977 in Karl-Marx-Stadt. This result ranks her tenth among German discus throwers, behind Gabriele Reinsch, Ilke Wyludda, Diana Gansky-Sachse, Irina Meszynski, Gisela Beyer, Martina Hellmann-Opitz, Evelin Jahl, Silvia Madetzky and Franka Dietzsch.

Sporting positions
Preceded by (Soviet Union) Faina Melnik	Women's Discus Best Year Performance; 1977	Succeeded by (East Germany) Evelin Jahl
