= Athletics at the 1975 Summer Universiade – Women's discus throw =

The women's discus throw event at the 1975 Summer Universiade was held at the Stadio Olimpico in Rome on 20 September.

== Results ==
Rank	Athlete	Nationality	Result	Notes
1st place, gold medalist(s)	Mariya Vergova	Bulgaria	65.28	
2nd place, silver medalist(s)	Argentina Menis	Romania	64.28	
3rd place, bronze medalist(s)	Radostina Bakhchevanova	Bulgaria	56.96	
4	Nadezhda Yerokha	Soviet Union	56.54	
5	Florența Ionescu	Romania	54.58	
6	Rima Makauskaitė	Soviet Union	52.38	
7	Ludwika Chewińska	Poland	47.98	
8	Janet Thompson	Great Britain	47.16	
9	Renata Scaglia	Italy	45.74	
10	Maura Zambon	Italy	42.42	
11	Guadalupe Lartigue	Mexico	34.88	
