= Masters W45 discus world record progression =

Masters W45 discus world record progression is the progression of world record improvements of the discus W45 division of Masters athletics. Records must be set in properly conducted, official competitions under the standing IAAF rules unless modified by World Masters Athletics. The W45 division consists of female athletes who have reached the age of 45 but have not yet reached the age of 50, so exactly from their 45th birthday to the day before their 50th birthday. The W45 division throws exactly the same 1 kg implement as the Open division.

Key

Incomplete information Pending

Distance	Athlete	Nationality	Birthdate	Age	Location	Date	Ref
65.96 m	Mélina Robert-Michon	France	18 July 1979	46 years, 265 days	Ramona	9 April 2026	
64.09 m	Zdeňka Šilhavá	Czech Republic	15 June 1954	45 years, 57 days	Pardubice	11 August 1999	
59.30 m	Helgi Parts	Soviet Union	15 September 1937	45 years, 352 days	Tartu	2 September 1983	
46.60 m	Almut Brömmel	Germany	5 May 1935	46 years, 98 days	Fontvieille	11 August 1981	
44.26 m	Rosemary Chrimes	Great Britain	19 May 1933	45 years, 57 days	Wolverhampton	15 July 1978	
43.12 m	Stepanka Mertova	Czech Republic	11 December 1930	46 years, 273 days	Jablonec	10 September 1977	
