= Silvia Madetzky =

German discus thrower

Silvia Madetzky (born 24 June 1962) is a German former discus thrower who competed for East Germany. Her personal best for the event is 70.34 m (230 ft 9 1/4 in), which ranks her within the all-time top thirty for the event, as of 2016. Despite this, her highest ever seasonal world ranking was only seventh, achieved in 1987.

Madetzky was a silver medallist in the discus at the 1979 European Athletics Junior Championships, forming an East German 1–2 with Irina Meszynski. Her first an only major senior selection was for the 1982 European Athletics Championships, where she finished in fifth place with a throw of 66.64 m (218 ft 7 1/2 in). This throw would have brought her at least the silver medal at all other previous editions of the championships, reflecting this sudden rise in standards. A member of the Chemie Halle sports club during her career, she twice reached the national podium, coming third at the East German Athletics Championships in 1985 and 1988.

The subsequent release of state documents showed Madetzky was given an annual amount of 2390 mg of Oral-Turinabol (a banned anabolic steroid) during her career under coach Gerhard Böttcher. This was during a period where there was widespread, state-sponsored doping in East Germany.

== International competitions ==
| Year | Competition | Venue | Position | Event | Notes |
|---|---|---|---|---|---|
| 1979 | European Junior Championships | Bydgoszcz, Poland | 2nd | Discus throw | 56.88 m |
| 1982 | European Championships | Athens, Greece | 5th | Discus throw | 66.64 m |

== See also ==
- List of doping cases in athletics
