= Leslie Deniz =

American athlete (born 1962)

Personal information
- Full name: Leslie Jean Deniz
- Born: May 25, 1962 (age 64) Oakland, California, U.S.
- Height: 5 ft 7 in (170 cm)

Sport
- Country: United States
- Sport: Athletics
- Event: Discus throw
Medal record
Women's athletics
Representing United States
Olympic Games
Silver medal – second place	1984 Los Angeles	Discus throw
Pan American Junior Athletics Championships
Gold medal – first place	1980 Sudbury	Discus throw

Leslie Jean Deniz (born May 25, 1962) is an American athlete who competed mainly in the women's discus throw event.

Deniz was born in Oakland, California, and grew up in Gridley, California, where she attended area schools, graduating from Gridley High School in 1980. While there she twice improved the NFHS national high school record in the discus throw to 172' 11" which lasted for two years. Deniz was adopted into a long time dairy farming family.

She competed for the United States in the 1984 Summer Olympics held in Los Angeles, U.S. in the Discus where she won the Silver medal. Leslie attended Arizona State University in Tempe after graduating from Gridley High School in 1980. Her teammate at ASU, Ria Stalman, won the 1984 Olympic gold medal in a tight competition.

Deniz completed her BA and MA and worked as a police officer and administrator with the Yuba City Police Department.

Deniz worked four years as the chief of police at California State University, Chico until late September 2006.

Deniz continues her committed work in law enforcement.

She is currently a professor of criminal justice studies at Woodland Community College.
