= Snoo =

Snoo may refer to:

- Snoo, the mascot of the website Reddit
- The Snoo, drummer otherwise known as Tré Cool
- Snoo Wilson (1948–2013), English playwright, screenwriter and director
- Laura De Snoo (born 1962), American discus thrower
