= Christian Georg Kohlrausch =

German academic

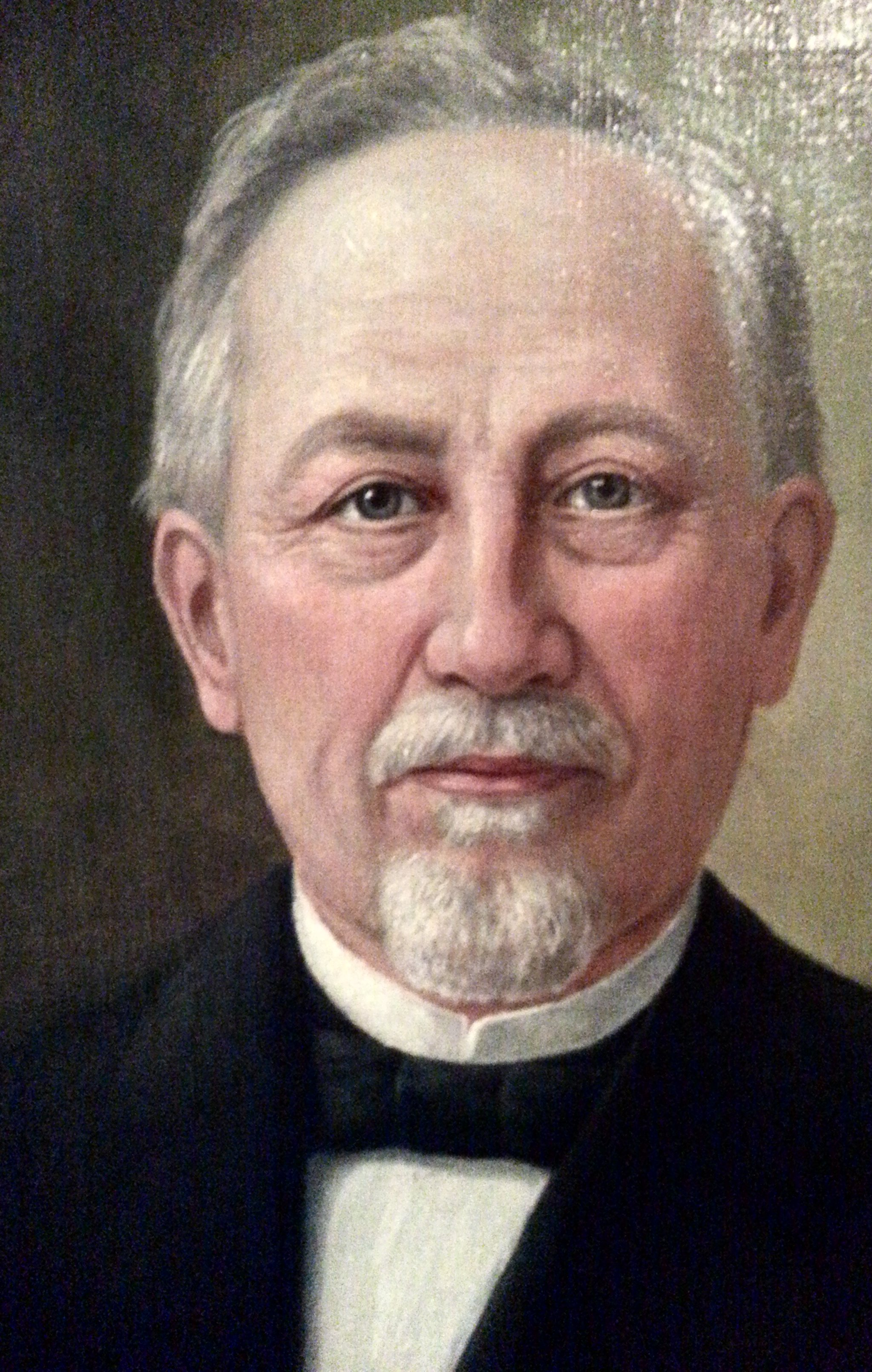
- Born: Christian Georg Kohlrausch; 2 April 1851; Benneckenstein, Province of Saxony, Kingdom of Prussia
- Died: 11 December 1934 (aged 83); Halberstadt, Province of Saxony, Germany
- Occupation: Teacher

Christian Georg Kohlrausch re-discovered the Discus – see Discus throw. Since the end of the Ancient Olympic Games, the discus was only known from sculpture like the Discobolus and drawings. The exact dimensions (shape), weight and the technique of throwing had not been recorded and handed down.

In 1880, Christian Georg Kohlrausch was appointed as gymnastics teacher at the Klosterschule "Pädagogium zum Kloster Unser Lieben Frauen" (grammar school "Our Ladies"), a former cloister school in Magdeburg. He taught here until his retirement in 1913. He became known around the World through his studies and experiments with pupils to re-discover the discus and the technique of throwing it. He was so well known in Germany at the time that he would receive letters from around the World addressed simply to "Christian Kohlrausch, Germany".

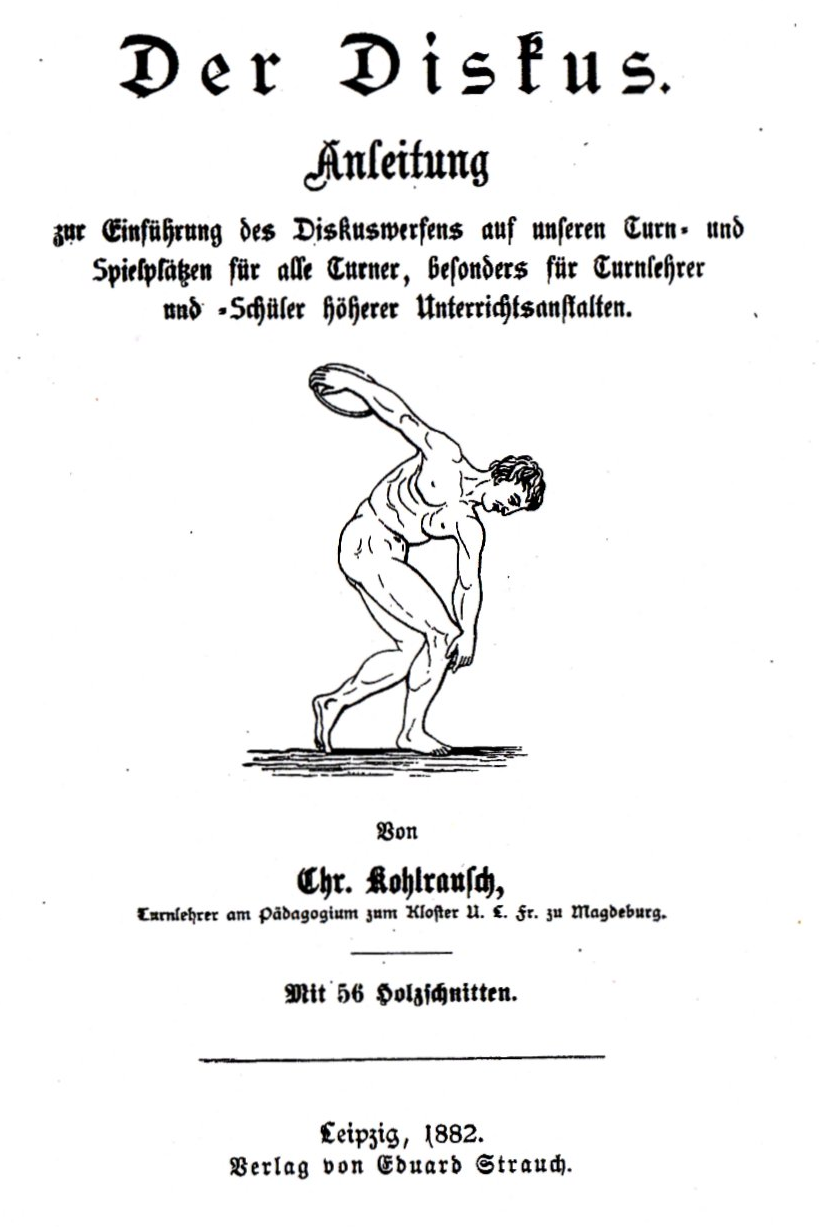
"Der Diskus. Anleitung" von Christian Georg Kohlrausch, 1882 - "The Discus. Instructions" by C.G. Kohlrausch

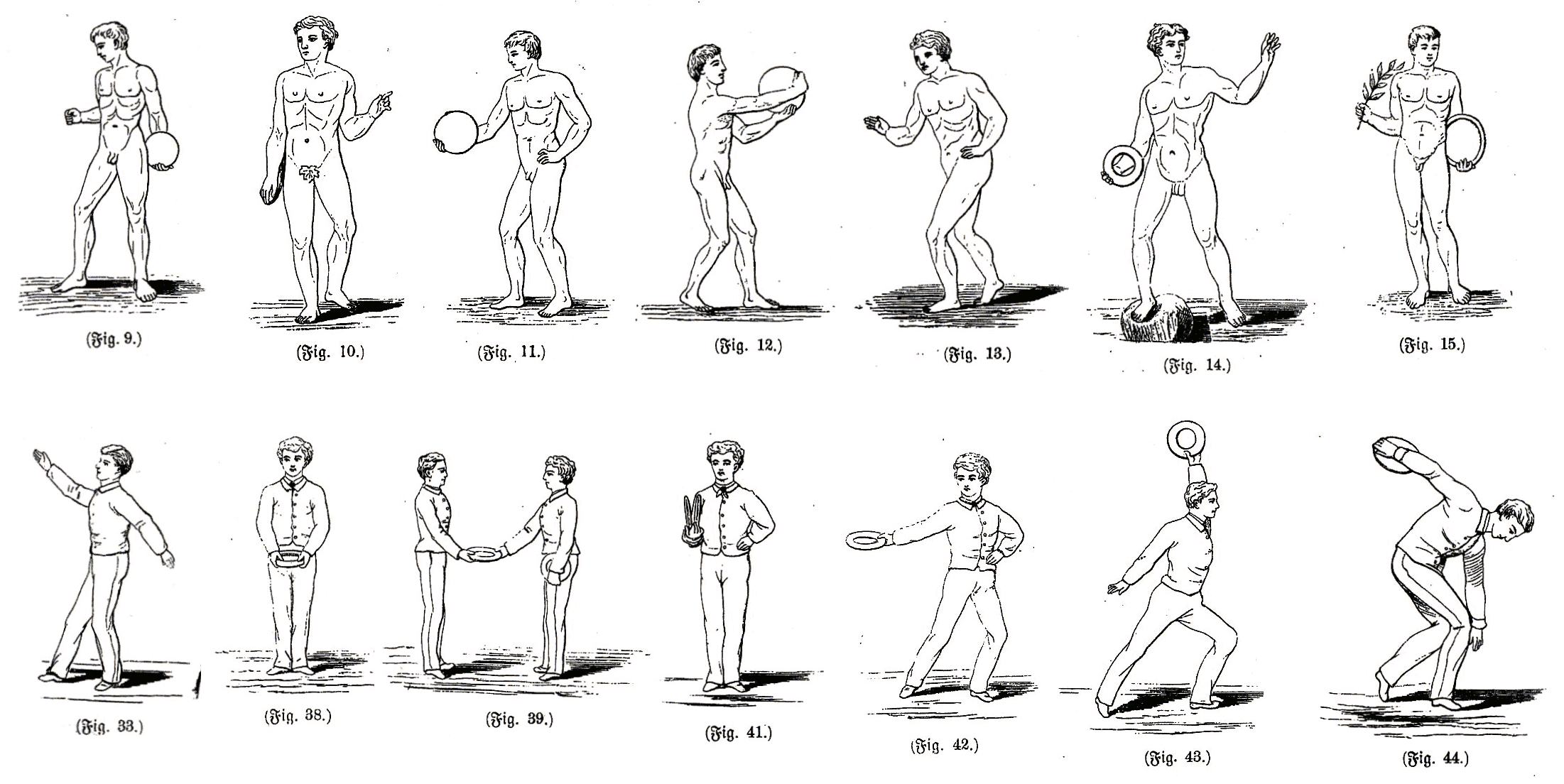
Wood carvings from "Der Diskus" Christian Georg Kohlrausch, 1882

Christian Kohlrausch examined what was known about this key Olympic discipline. He worked with students to re-discover once more the shape and dimensions of the discus. During sport lessons in and outside of school he developed and refined the technique of throwing and turned it once more into a competitive sport discipline. Due to his work the Discus throw was included in the very first Olympic Games of Modern Times in 1896.

Around 1880/81, he introduced "games in the open air" ("Spiele im Freien") to his school in Magdeburg and in this helped to introduce Football in Germany, which is mostly attributed to Konrad Koch with whom he collaborated. In the early days (until 1893) the rules of Football were based on Rugby.

== Literature ==
- Jahrbücher für Philologie und Paedagogik, 1880, Turnspiele. Bedürfnis und Einführung
- Turn-Zeitung, No.16, 1880, Die Frühjahrsbewegung
- Turn-Zeitung, No.40, 1880, Die Einführung des Diskus auf unseren Turnplätzen
- Der Diskus. Anleitung zur Einführung des Diskuswerfens auf unseren Turn- und Spielplätzen für alle Turner, besonders für Turnlehrer und -schüler höherer Unterrichtsanstalten, Leipzig 1882
- Das Turnen in Magdeburg. Ein historischer Abriß der Entwicklung der Leibesübungen in Magdeburg, 1892
- Deutsches Turnen. Vorträge und Lehrpläne, 1908

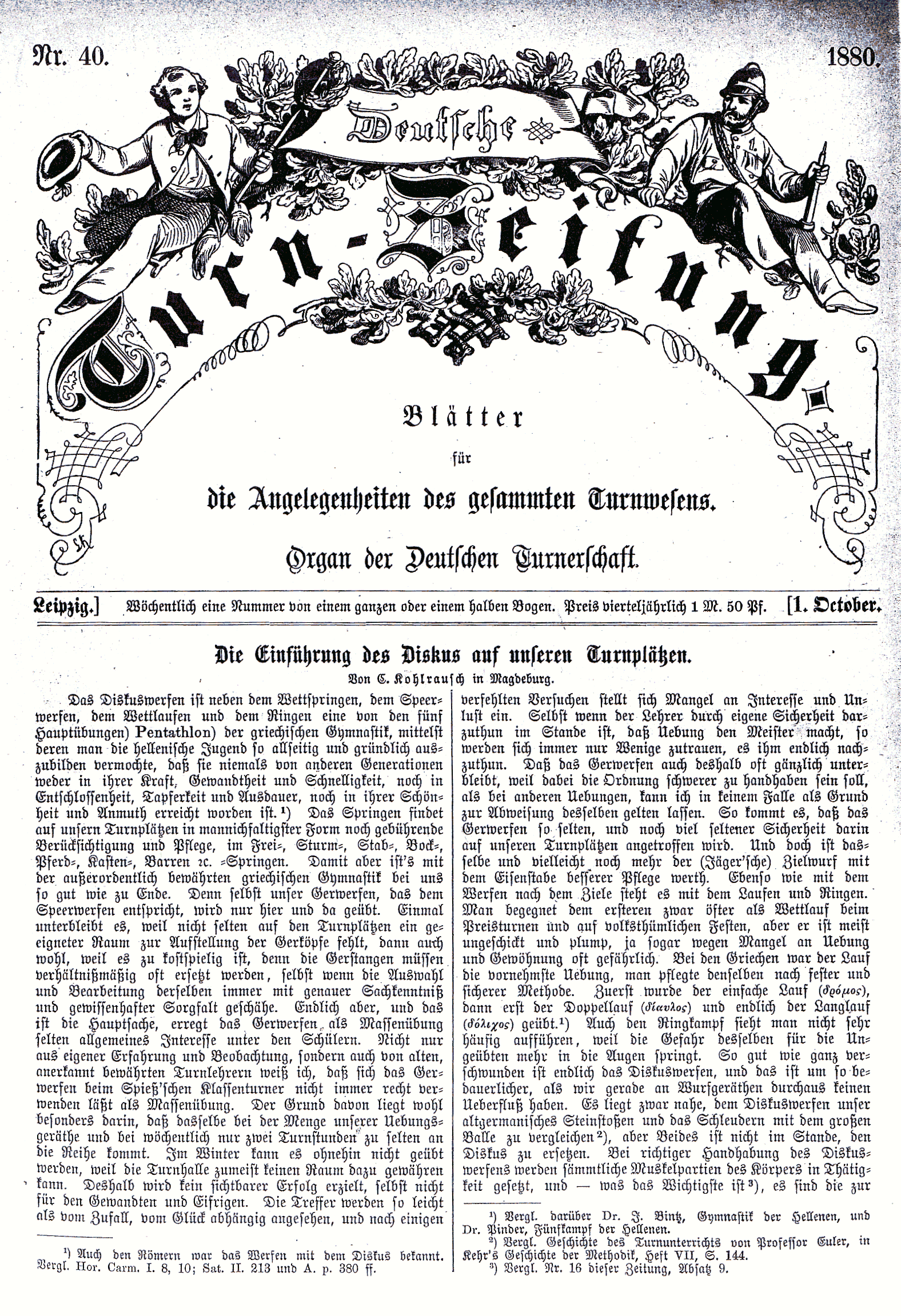
Turn-Zeitung, No.40, 1880, "Die Einführung des Diskus auf unseren Turnplätzen" - Gymnastics Newspaper - "The Introduction of the Discus on our Gymnastic Fields"
