= United States champions in women's discus throw =

The women's national discus championships are hosted by USA Track & Field at a venue voted on by the committee. The competition has been held in the United States since 1923, five years before it was added to the Olympic Games in 1928.

Year	Distance	Champion	
2009	64.25m / 210-9	Stephanie Brown Trafton	Nike
2008	65.20m / 213-11	Aretha Thurmond	Nike
2007	60.63m / 198-11	Suzy Powell	Asics
2006	62.50m / 205-1	Aretha Thurmond	Nike
2005	62.92m / 206-5	Rebecca Breisch	Nebraska
2004	63.55m / 208-6	Aretha Hill	Nike
2003	63.98m / 209-11	Aretha Hill	Nike
2002	211-05	Kris Kuehl	Nike
2001	207-10	Seilala Sua	Unattached
2000	216-2	Seilala Sua	Reebok
1999	203-8	Seilala Sua	Reebok Bruin
1998	204-2	Seilala Sua	UCLA
1997	200-8	Lacy Barnes-Mileham	Nike
1996	198-9	Suzy Powell	UCLA
1995	205-4	Edie Boyer	Unat-MN
1994	195-1	Connie Price-Smith	Nike Coast
1993	208-5	Connie Price-Smith	Nike Coast
1992	202-6	Connie Price-Smith	Nike Coast
1991	199-10	Lacy Barnes	Nike TC
1990	191-6	Connie Price	Nike North
1989	201-11	Connie Price	Ath West
1988	203-9	Lacy Barnes	Fresno St
1987	212-5	Connie Price	Coast Ath
1986	205-9	Carol Cady	Stanford TC
1985	200-9	Carol Cady	Tr America
1984	221-9	Ria Stalman	adidas/HOL
1983	206-3	Leslie Deniz	Ariz. St
1982	203-10	Ria Stalman	LAN/HOL
1981	182-9	Leslie Deniz	SDSF
1980	191-9	Lorna Griffin	ACA
1979	189-5	Lynne Winbigler	Ore TC
1978	178-6	Lynne Winbigler	Ore TC
1977	193-6	Jane Haist	CANADA
1976	174-10	Lynne Winbigler	Ore TC
1975	159-7	Jean Roberts	Delaware SC/AUS
1974	173-11	Joan Pavelich	Unat
1973	173-3	Jean Roberts	Delaware SC/AUS
1972	172-0	Josephina de la Vina	Daley/PHI
1971	179-6	Josephina de la Vina	Daley/PHI
1970	172-3	Carol Frost	Nebraska TC
1969	167-3	Carol M. Frost	Neb. TC
1968	170-10	Olga Connolly	CulverCTC
1967	152-5	Carol Moseke	NebraskaTC
1966	159-8	Carol Moseke	NebraskaTC
1965	157-9	Lynn Graham	LA Merc.
1964	158-4	Olga Connolly	LA Merc.
1963	150-6	Sharon Shepherd	Cl. Rec
1962	172-2	Olga Connolly	PasadenaTC
1961	149-4.5	Earlene Brown	Unat
1960	159-6.5	Olga Connolly	Spartan AC
1959	153-8	Earlene Brown	Spartan AC
1958	152-5.5	Earlene Brown	Unat
1957	147-8	Olga Connolly	Unat
1956	140-11	Pam Kurrell	Unat
1955	117-8	Alejandra Ilarra	CUBA
	115-1	2-Marjorie Larney	Equitable
1954	120-11.5	Marjorie Larney	Equitable
1953	123-2	Janet Dicks	Harrisburg AA
1952	114-7.5	Janet Dicks	Harrisburg AA
1951	121-0.125	Frances Kazubski	Unat
1950	113-4.75	Frances Kazubski	Sandy's
1949	129-9	Frances Kazubski	Unat
1948	124-3.375	Frances Kazubski	W. Lake
1947	110-4.75	Frances Kazubski	PWOAC
1946	102-6	Dorothy Dodson	Unat
1945	103-0.25	Frances Kazubski	PWOAC
1944	101-7.75	Hattie Turner	Tuskegee
1943	109-6.25	Frances Gorn	Cle. PWOAC
1942	110-11.75	Stella Walsh	PWOAC
1941	113-10.375	Stella Walsh	PWOAC
1940	114-11	Cath. Fellmeth	ChicagoPk
1939	133-7.5	Cath. Fellmeth	ChicagoPk
1938	126-0.25	Catherine Fellmeth	Unat
1937	107-11	Elizabeth Lindsey	Ger.AAC
1936	123-6.5	Helen Stephens	Woods Col
1935	133-9.5	Margaret Wright	BrocktonGC
1934	Not held		
1933	123-0.25	Ruth Osborn	Unat
1932	133-0.75	Ruth Osborn	Unat
1931	108-10.625	Evelyn Ferrara	Ill. WAC
1930	111-6	Evelyn Ferrara	Ill. WAC
1929	113-4	Rena McDonald	Boston Swim
1928	116-9.25	Maybelle Reichardt	Pas. AC
1927	103-8.313	Lillian Copeland	Pas. AC
1926	101-1	Lillian Copeland	Pas. AC
1925	87-2.75	Maybelle Reichardt	Pas.AC
1924	70-0	Roberta Ranck	Phil. Turn
1923	71-9.5	Babe Wolbert	Unat
