= Martina Hellmann =

East German discus thrower

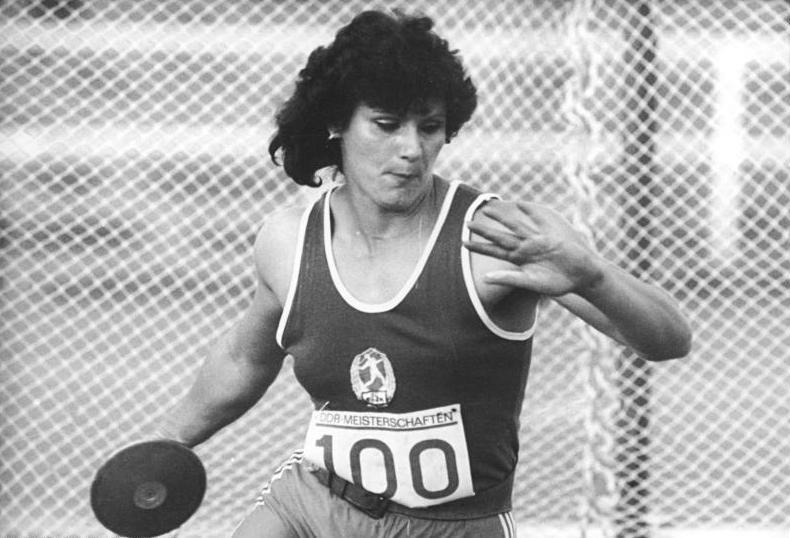
- Martina Hellmann at the East German Track and Field Athletics Championships in Potsdam August 1987

Personal information
- Full name: Martina Helga Hellmann
- Born: Martina Helga Opitz; 12 December 1960 (age 65) Leipzig, East Germany
- Height: 1.78 m (5 ft 10 in)
- Weight: 85 kg (187 lb)

Sport
- Country: East Germany (1983–1990); Germany (1991–1992)
- Sport: Athletics
- Event: Discus throw
- Club: SC DHfK Leipzig

Achievements and titles
- Personal best: 72.92 m (1987)
Medal record
Women's athletics
Representing East Germany
Olympic Games
Gold medal – first place	1988 Seoul	Discus
World Championships
Gold medal – first place	1983 Helsinki	Discus
Gold medal – first place	1987 Rome	Discus
European Championships
Bronze medal – third place	1986 Stuttgart	Discus
Bronze medal – third place	1990 Split	Discus

Martina Helga Hellmann (née Opitz; born 12 December 1960) is a retired German track and field athlete who represented East Germany. She was the Olympic champion in the discus throw at the 1988 Summer Olympics. She also won the World Championship in that event in 1983 and again in 1987.

Born in Leipzig, Saxony, Hellmann was sixteen years old when she began participating in the event. In 1977 she gave the participants' oath at the opening of the East German gymnastics and sport festival. That summer she set the world record for 16-year-olds with a throw of 55.00 meters. Her career was plagued by sickness and injury until 1983 when she became the surprise world champion. She was unable to compete at the 1984 summer Olympic games due to her country's boycott.

On 6 September 1988 she threw the discus 78.14 metres, farther than any woman had ever thrown it before or after. However, this throw was in an unofficial tournament in the East German training camp at Kienbaum set up to decide the final GDR place for the Olympic games in Seoul and was not eligible to be considered a world record. During this session she threw the following distances, two of them exceeding the world record at the time, and two more that were ever exceeded by only one female thrower: 76.92m – 78.14m – 70.52m – 76.56m – 75.66m – 74.04m (the women's world record, set in July 1988, is 76.80 m). Ilke Wyludda threw a lifetime best 75.36 m, but had to stay home. Five of Hellmann's throws during that competition were better than her official best of 72.92 metres, achieved in August 1987 in Potsdam, and which ranks her ninth on the world all-time list and sixth among German discus throwers, behind Gabriele Reinsch, Ilke Wyludda, Diana Gansky-Sachse, Irina Meszynski and Gisela Beyer.

After the 1992 Summer Olympics, where she was eliminated during qualification, she retired. She later was the head of a sports group of the insurance company AOK and became a manager at a cabaret in Leipzig.

Hellmann represented the SC DHfK Leipzig sport club and trained with Rolf Wittenbecher and Bernhard Thomas. During her active career she was 1.78 meters tall and weighed 85 kilograms.

== Evidence of doping ==
There is substantial evidence that nearly all East German Olympic track and field athletes in the 1980s, including Hellman, used steroids to enhance athletic performance as part of a state-sponsored program.

== International competitions ==
Year	Competition	Venue	Position	Notes
Representing East Germany
1983	World Championships	Helsinki, Finland	1st	68.94 m
1985	World Cup	Canberra, Australia	1st	69.78 m
1986	Goodwill Games	Moscow, Soviet Union	2nd	69.04 m
1986	European Championships	Stuttgart, West Germany	3rd	68.26 m
1987	World Championships	Rome, Italy	1st	71.62 m (current CR)
1988	Olympic Games	Seoul, South Korea	1st	72.30 m (current OR)
1990	European Championships	Split, FR Yugoslavia	3rd	66.66 m
Representing Germany
1991	World Championships	Tokyo, Japan	4th	67.14 m
1992	Olympic Games	Barcelona, Spain	14th (q)	60.52 m
