= Natalya Gorbachova =

Soviet discus thrower

Personal information
- Nationality: Soviet
- Born: 24 July 1947 (age 78)

Sport
- Sport: Athletics
- Event: Discus throw
Medal record
Women's athletics
Representing Soviet Union
European Championships
Bronze medal – third place	1978 Prague	Discus throw

Natalya Gorbachova (Russian: Наталья Горбачёва; born 24 July 1947) is a Soviet athlete. She competed in the women's discus throw at the 1976 Summer Olympics.
