= Masters W45 shot put world record progression =

Masters W45 shot put world record progression is the progression of world record improvements of the shot put W45 division of Masters athletics. Records must be set in properly conducted, official competitions under the standing IAAF rules unless modified by World Masters Athletics. The W45 division consists of female athletes who have reached the age of 45 but have not yet reached the age of 50, so exactly from their 45th birthday to the day before their 50th birthday. The W45 division throws exactly the same 4 kg implement as the Women's Open division.

Key

Incomplete information Pending Indoor mark before 2000, not acceptable for record

Distance	Athlete	Nationality	Birthdate	Location	Date
16.95	Zdeňka Šilhavá	Czech Republic	15.06.1954	Ostrava	26.06.1999
16.79	Helgi Parts	Estonia	15.09.1937	Tartu	02.09.1983
14.38	Liesel Huber	Germany	09.03.1934	Munich	26.06.1981
14.02	Sigrun Kofink	Germany	23.04.1935	Helsinki	09.08.1980
12.15	Marianne Hamm	Germany	02.10.1927	Dänischenhagen	13.10.1973
