= Laura De Snoo =

American discus thrower

Personal information
- Full name: Laura Denise DeSnoo
- Born: September 21, 1962 (age 63) Fremont, California, U.S.
- Height: 5 ft 11 in (180 cm)

Sport
- Country: United States
- Sport: Athletics
- Event: Discus throw

Laura Denise DeSnoo (born September 21, 1962) is an American discus thrower. She was born in Fremont, California. She competed at the 1984 Summer Olympics in Los Angeles, where she placed tenth in women's discus throw.
