= Meg Ritchie =

Scottish discus thrower and shot putter (born 1952)

Meg Stone Ritchie
Personal information
- Nationality: British (Scottish)
- Born: 6 July 1952 (age 73) Kirkcaldy, Scotland
- Height: 178 cm (5 ft 10 in)
- Weight: 87 kg (192 lb)

Sport
- Sport: Athletics
- Event: discus throw
- Club: Edinburgh Southern Harriers
Medal record
Representing Scotland
Commonwealth Games
Gold medal – first place	1982 Brisbane	Discus throw

Margaret "Meg" Elizabeth Ritchie (born 6 July 1952) is a retired Scottish discus thrower and Shot putter. She reached the Olympic finals at discus in Moscow 1980 (9th) and Los Angeles 1984 (5th). She also won the 1982 Commonwealth Games title. Her discus best of 67.48 metres has stood as the British record since 1981, while her shot put best of 18.99 metres has stood as the Scottish record since 1983.

== Athletics career ==
Born in Kirkcaldy, Fife, Ritchie won the Scottish championships in discus seven times and in shot put she won three Scottish titles. She also won the UK Championships four times in the discus, and three AAA discus titles. Her personal best throw was 67.48 m (221 ft 4 1/2 in), achieved in April 1981 in Walnut. This is the current NCAA Women's Outdoor Track and Field and British record.

Ritchie finished second behind fellow Scot Rosemary Payne in the discus event at the 1973 WAAA Championships. Two years later she became the British discus champion after winning the British WAAA Championships title at the 1975 WAAA Championships and successfully regained the title at the 1977 WAAA Championships and the 1981 WAAA Championships.

Representing the Arizona Wildcats track and field team, in 1982 she won the NCAA Division 1 Championships shot/discus double in America. Later that same year she won the discus gold medal at the 1982 Commonwealth Games in Brisbane.

In the shot put her personal best was 18.99 m (62 ft 3 1/2 in), achieved in May 1983 in Tucson. This is the current Scottish national record

== Personal life ==
Ritchie is married to Dr. Michael H. Stone. She is the Director of East Tennessee State University Sports Performance Enhancement Consortium (SPEC), the Director of the Center of Excellence for Coach Education, and Assistant Coach for Men's and Women's Track and Field at ETSU (Throws). Under her tutelage, the male throwers from ETSU have proceeded to break the indoor shot, discus, hammer, 35 lb weight, and outdoor shot school records. The women have set new records in the 20 lb weight throw and the hammer throw.

== International competitions ==
Year	Competition	Venue	Position	Notes
Representing Great Britain / Scotland
1978	European Championships	Prague, Czechoslovakia	13th	Discus throw
1978	Commonwealth Games	Edmonton, Canada	8th	Shot put
1978	Commonwealth Games	Edmonton, Canada	4th	Discus throw
1979	European Cup	Turin, Italy	5th	Discus throw
1980	Olympic Games	Moscow, USSR	9th	Discus throw
1982	Commonwealth Games	Brisbane, Australia	1st	Discus throw
1983	World Championships	Helsinki, Finland	8th	Discus throw
1983	World Championships	Helsinki, Finland	16th	Shot put
1983	European Cup	London, United Kingdom	5th	Discus throw
1984	Olympic Games	Los Angeles, United States	5th	Discus throw
