= Ria Stalman =

Dutch discus thrower and shot putter

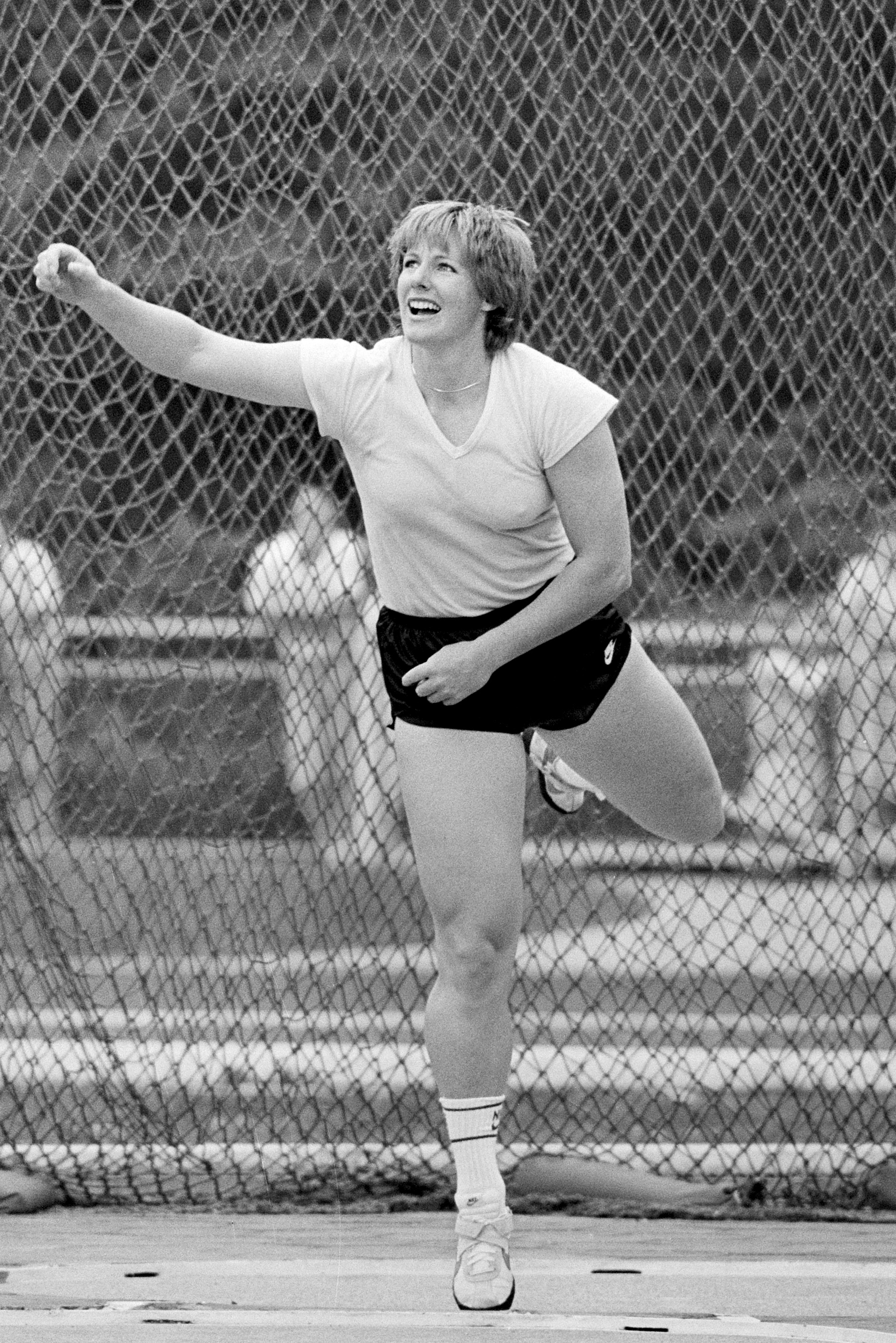
- Ria Stalman in 1982

Personal information
- Born: 11 December 1951 (age 74) Delft, Netherlands
- Height: 1.79 m (5 ft 10 in)
- Weight: 82 kg (181 lb)

Sport
- Sport: Discus throw, shot put
- Club: Sparta, The Hague
Medal record
Representing the Netherlands
Olympic Games
Gold medal – first place	1984 Los Angeles	Discus throw

Maria Geertruida "Ria" Stalman (Dutch: [maːˈrijaː ɣeːrˈtrœydaː ˈrijaː ˈstɑlmɑn]; born 11 December 1951) is a Dutch retired discus thrower and shot putter.

In discus throw, her personal best is 71.22 m from 1984, a Dutch record that was later annulled, and in shot put, her personal best is 18.02 m from 1984, also a Dutch record. She won the gold medal in discus throw at the 1984 Summer Olympics. She also has 15 national titles in discus throw and shot put.

In 2016, she admitted to the use of doping in the 1980s. In response, the Royal Dutch Athletics Federation annulled her unsurpassed national record in discus throw set in that period.

== Career ==
From 1971 to 1983, she won 22 medals in the discus throw and shot put events at the Dutch Championships, including 15 gold medals.

After a brief career with the UTEP Miners track and field team, Stalman went to Arizona State University, where she was on the Arizona State Sun Devils track and field team. In June 1982, she won a gold medal for her discus throw of 62.13 m in the 1982 USA Outdoor Track and Field Championships.

In September 1982, she became 12th in the discus throw event during the 1982 European Athletics Championships in Athens, Greece. In August 1983, she was 7th in the discus throw event during the 1983 World Championships in Athletics in Helsinki, Finland.

In June 1984, she won both a gold medal in the shot put event for her 18.02 m result and in the discus throw event for her 67.59 m result in the 1984 USA Outdoor Track and Field Championships. In July 1984, she achieved her all-time best discus throw of 71.22 m in Walnut, CA, a Dutch record that remained on the books until it was annulled in 2016.

At the Los Angeles Summer Olympics in August 1984, she won the gold medal for her 65.36 m in the discus throw event. The Royal Dutch Athletics Federation gave her the Membership of Merit and the NOC*NSF gave her the Dutch Sportswoman of the Year award that year. She was knighted in the Order of Orange-Nassau the following year.

She retired shortly after the Olympics to work as a journalist for Algemeen Dagblad, Sport International, and Atletiek Wereld and as an athletics commentator for Eurosport and RTL 4.

=== Doping use ===
In March 1992, Stalman was accused by her former training partner and former roommate Jennifer Smit of using doping during their time in the United States and of being caught at the border trying to import a large number of Winstrol tablets from Mexico. In a response, Stalman denied that she had used doping and didn't want to discuss importing tablets at the advice of an attorney she had consulted. The Royal Dutch Athletics Federation stated that they didn't believe the accusations, that also implicated one of their officials.

In January 2016, Stalman admitted in a TV interview that she had been using anabolic steroids during the last 2.5 years of her career, which includes the period when she won her Olympic gold medal and when she set her national discus throw record. The Doping Authority Netherlands indicated that after more than ten years a doping offense is too old to prosecute, so her results would remain unchanged. However, the Royal Dutch Athletics Federation took away her Membership of Merit and annulled her national record in response.

== Achievements ==
=== Personal bests ===
- Discus throw: 71.22 m ~~NR~~ (Walnut, CA, 1984)
- Shot put: 18.02 m NR (San Jose, CA, 1984)

=== International competitions ===
Representing the Netherlands
Year	Competition	Venue	Position	Event	Time	Notes
1982	European Championships	Athens, Greece	12th	Discus throw	58.48 m	
1983	World Championships	Helsinki, Finland	7th	Discus throw	63.76 m	
1983	European Cup, Final B	Sittard, Netherlands	1st	Discus throw	61.14 m	
1984	Olympic Games	Los Angeles, United States	1st	Discus throw	65.36 m	

Awards
Preceded by Mieke van Doorn	KNAU Cup; 1976; 1983, 1984	Succeeded by Mirjam van Laar
Preceded by Carla Beurskens	KNAU Cup; 1976; 1983, 1984	Succeeded by Carla Beurskens
Preceded by Conny van Bentum	Dutch Sportswoman of the Year; 1984	Succeeded by Bettine Vriesekoop
