= Evelin Jahl =

East German discus thrower

Personal information
- Born: Evelin Schlaak; 28 March 1956 (age 70) Annaberg-Buchholz, Saxony, East Germany
- Height: 1.79 m (5 ft 10 in)
- Weight: 84 kg (185 lb)

Sport
- Sport: Athletics
- Event: Discus
- Club: ASK Vorwärts Potsdam
- Coached by: Lothar Hillebrandt

Achievements and titles
- Personal best: 71.50 m (1980)
Medal record
Women's athletics
Representing East Germany
Olympic Games
Gold medal – first place	1976 Montreal	Discus
Gold medal – first place	1980 Moscow	Discus
IAAF World Cup
Gold medal – first place	1979 Montreal	Discus
Gold medal – first place	1981 Rome	Discus
European Championships
Gold medal – first place	1978 Prague	Discus
Universiade
Silver medal – second place	1979 Mexico City	Discus throw

Evelin Jahl (née Schlaak and later Herberg, born 28 March 1956) is a German former discus thrower, who won two Olympic gold medals representing East Germany.

In 1976 she won the women's discus throwing event at the Montreal Summer Olympics defeating favourite and world record holder Faina Melnik. In 1978 she set a new world record and also won the European Championships. Two years later Jahl defended the Olympic title in Moscow, again relegating Vergova, also competing under her married name (Petkova), into second place. From 1980 until 2016 Jahl was the only discus thrower to defend her Olympic title and win two Olympic gold medals. Her feat was equalled by Sandra Perković of Croatia at the 2016 Summer Olympics in Rio de Janeiro.

She retired from throwing in 1982 after an injury. She later became GDR chairperson of a commission in the GDR track and field association DVfL.

After the 1976 Olympics she married shot putter Norbert Jahl und competed under her married name for the rest of her sporting career. Shortly after her retirement, she married the swim trainer Harald Herberg but she soon divorced him. A son was born from the brief marriage.

Records
Preceded by Faina Melnik	Women's Discus World Record Holder; 12 August 1978 – 15 July 1980	Succeeded by Mariya Petkova
Sporting positions
Preceded by Sabine Engel; Mariya Petkova	Women's Discus Best Year Performance; 1978–1979; 1981	Succeeded by Mariya Petkova; Irina Meszynski
