= Galina Murašova =

Lithuanian discus thrower (born 1955)

Personal information
- Born: December 22, 1955 (age 70) Vilnius, Soviet Union

Sport
- Sport: Track and field
Medal record
Representing Soviet Union
World Championships
Silver medal – second place	1983 Helsinki	Discus throw

Galina Murašova (Russian: Галина Мурашова; born December 22, 1955) is a retired female discus thrower, who competed for the Soviet Union at two Summer Olympics: 1980 and 1988. Her last name is sometimes also spelled as Murashova.

Murašova set the Lithuanian national record in the women's discus throw on August 18, 1984, in Prague, by throwing 72.14 metres. She claimed the silver medal in the women's discus throw event at the 1983 World Championships in Helsinki, Finland, behind East Germany's Martina Opitz.

== Achievements ==
Year	Competition	Venue	Position	Notes
Representing the Soviet Union
1980	Summer Olympics	Moscow, Soviet Union	7th	63.84 m
1983	World Championships	Helsinki, Finland	2nd	67.44 m
