= Zdeňka Šilhavá =

Czech discus thrower and shot putter

Zdeňka Šilhavá (born Kusá, later known as Bartoňová-Šilhavá; 15 June 1954 in Krnov) is a Czech retired female track and field athlete who represented Czechoslovakia. She set the world record in the women's discus throw on 26 August 1984 with a distance of 74.56 metres (244.6 ft). That mark still is the national record.

Šilhavá represented Czechoslovakia at the 1988 Summer Olympics in Seoul, South Korea, finishing in sixth place (67.84 metres (222.6 ft)) in the women's discus, and in eleventh place in the women's shot put event (18.86 metres (61.9 ft)). She threw again in the 1996 Summer Olympics at the age of 42. Three years after the Olympics, she threw masters W45 world records in both the shot put and discus that still stand.

== Doping ==
Šilhavá tested positive for anabolic steroids at the European Cup in Moscow in August 1985 and was subsequently banned for life by the European Athletics Federation. The ban was later reduced to 18 months by the IAAF.

== Personal life ==
She is married to discus thrower Josef Šilhavý.

== Achievements ==
Year	Competition	Venue	Position	Event	Notes
Representing Czechoslovakia
1982	European Championships	Athens, Greece	9th	Shot put	18.46 m
1982	European Championships	Athens, Greece	13th	Discus	56.16 m
1983	World Championships	Helsinki, Finland	6th	Discus	64.32 m
1983	World Championships	Helsinki, Finland	9th	Shot put	19.00 m
1987	World Championships	Rome, Italy	6th	Discus	64.82 m
1988	Olympic Games	Seoul, South Korea	6th	Discus	67.84 m
1988	Olympic Games	Seoul, South Korea	11th	Shot put	18.86 m
Representing the Czech Republic
1993	World Championships	Stuttgart, Germany	22nd (q)	Discus	57.16 m
1994	European Championships	Helsinki, Finland	12th	Discus	55.04 m
1995	World Championships	Gothenburg, Sweden	24th (q)	Discus	56.38 m
1996	Olympic Games	Atlanta, United States	19th (q)	Discus	59.24 m

Records
Preceded by (East Germany) Irina Meszynski	Women's Discus World Record Holder; 26 August 1984 – 9 July 1988	Succeeded by (East Germany) Gabriele Reinsch
Sporting positions
Preceded by (Soviet Union) Galina Savinkova	Women's Discus Best Year Performance; 1984	Succeeded by (Soviet Union) Galina Savinkova
