= Mariya Petkova =

Bulgarian discus thrower

Personal information
- Native name: Мария Димитрова Леткова
- Full name: Mariya Dimitrova Petkova
- Born: Mariya Dimitrova Vergova; 3 November 1950 (age 75) Plovdiv, Bulgaria
- Height: 1.85 m (6 ft 1 in)
- Weight: 105 kg (231 lb)

Sport
- Sport: Athletics
- Event: Discus throw

Achievements and titles
- Personal best: 71.80 m (1980)
Medal record
Women's athletics
Representing Bulgaria
Olympic Games
Silver medal – second place	1976 Montreal	Discus
Silver medal – second place	1980 Moscow	Discus
World Championships
Bronze medal – third place	1983 Helsinki	Discus
European Championships
Silver medal – second place	1982 Athens	Discus
Universiade
Gold medal – first place	1975 Rome	Discus throw
Gold medal – first place	1977 Sofia	Discus throw

Mariya Dimitrova Petkova (Bulgarian: Мария Димитрова Петкова, née Vergova (Вергова); born 3 November 1950 in Plovdiv) is a retired Bulgarian discus thrower. In 1976 she won an Olympic silver medal behind Evelin Schlaak, a standing that would repeat itself in 1980. This year she also achieved a personal best throw of 71.80 metres. In 1982 she won a European Championship silver medal behind countrywoman Tsvetanka Khristova, who is twelve years younger. One year later Petkova won the bronze medal at the first World Championships in Athletics.

== Achievements ==
Year	Competition	Venue	Position	Notes
Representing Bulgaria
1975	World Student Games	Rome, Italy	1st	65.28 m
1976	Summer Olympics	Montreal, Canada	2nd	67.30 m
1977	World Student Games	Sofia, Bulgaria	1st	66.34 m
1980	Summer Olympics	Moscow, USSR	2nd	67.90 m
1982	European Championships	Athens, Greece	2nd	67.94 m
1983	World Championships	Helsinki, Finland	3rd	66.44 m

In 1974 Mariya Petkova bench pressed 210 kg without the use of supportive gear of any kind. This is more than any other woman in history.

Records
Preceded by (East Germany) Evelin Jahl	Women's Discus World Record Holder; 15 July 1980 – 23 May 1983	Succeeded by (Soviet Union) Galina Savinkova
Sporting positions
Preceded by (East Germany) Evelin Jahl	Women's Discus Best Year Performance; 1980	Succeeded by (East Germany) Evelin Jahl
