= Svetla Bozhkova =

Bulgarian discus thrower

Svetla Bozhkova Gyuleva (Bulgarian: Светла Божкова Гюлева; born March 13, 1951, in Yambol) is a retired female discus thrower, who competed for Bulgaria at two Summer Olympics: 1972 and 1980. A member of Tundzha Yambol and Levski-Spartak Club, she set her personal best (67.26 metres) in 1980.
