= Patricia Walsh (athlete) =

Irish discus thrower and runner

Personal information
- Nationality: Irish
- Born: 16 March 1960 (age 66)
- Height: 167 cm (5 ft 6 in)
- Weight: 73 kg (161 lb)

Sport
- Sport: Athletics
- Event: Discus throw
- Club: Tennessee Volunteers

Patricia Margaret Walsh (born 16 March 1960) is a former Irish athlete, who competed at the 1984 Summer Olympics.

== Biography ==
Walsh finished second behind Janet Thompson in the discus throw event at the 1978 WAAA Championships and subsequently finished second again to Thompson at the 1979 WAAA Championships. Another second place ensued at the 1983 WAAA Championships but this time behind Lynda Whiteley.

Walsh competed in the discus eventat the 1984 Olympic Games in Los Angeles.
