= Jiao Yunxiang =

Chinese discus thrower

Personal information
- Nationality: Chinese
- Born: 29 May 1956 (age 70) Pingdu, Shandong Province, China

Sport
- Sport: Athletics
- Event: Discus throw
Medal record
Women's athletics
Representing China
Asian Championships
Gold medal – first place	1983 Kuwait City	Discus throw

Jiao Yunxiang (born 29 May 1956) is a Chinese athlete. She competed in the women's discus throw at the 1984 Summer Olympics.
