= Tatyana Lesovaya =

Soviet discus thrower

Personal information
- Born: April 24, 1956 (age 70) Taldykorgan, Soviet Union

Sport
- Sport: Track and field
Medal record
Representing Soviet Union
Olympic Games
Bronze medal – third place	1980 Moscow	Discus throw

Tatyana Dmitryevna Lesovaya (Russian: Татьяна Дмитриевна Лесовая, née Starodubtseva (Стародубцева), born April 24, 1956) is a retired athlete who represented Soviet Union (until 1991) and later Kazakhstan. Competing in the discus throw, her greatest achievement was a bronze medal at the 1980 Summer Olympics. Her daughter Mariya Telushkina is also a discus thrower. Her personal best throw was 68.18 metres, achieved in 1982.
