= Ulla Lundholm =

Finnish discus thrower

Personal information
- Nationality: Finnish
- Born: 20 February 1957 (age 69)

Sport
- Sport: Athletics
- Event: Discus throw

Ulla Lundholm (born 20 February 1957) is a Finnish athlete. She competed in the women's discus throw at the 1984 Summer Olympics.
