= Ingra Manecke =

German discus thrower

Personal information
- Nationality: German
- Born: 31 March 1956 (age 70) Göttingen, West Germany

Sport
- Sport: Athletics
- Event: Discus throw

Ingra-Anne Manecke (born 31 March 1956) is a German athlete. She competed in the women's discus throw at the 1984 Summer Olympics.
