= Galina Savinkova =

Soviet discus thrower

Medal record

Women's athletics

Representing Soviet Union

European Championships
Bronze medal – third place	1982 Athens	Discus throw

Galina Savinkova (Russian: Галина Савинкова; born 15 July 1953) is a retired female track and field athlete from the Soviet Union, who set the world record in the women's discus throw on 23 May 1983 with a distance of 73.26 metres. A year later, on 8 September 1984 in Donetsk, she reached 73.28 metres. That mark still is the Russian national record.

== Achievements ==
Year	Competition	Venue	Position	Notes
Representing Soviet Union
1983	World Championships	Helsinki, Finland	11th	59.28 m

Records
Preceded by (Bulgaria) Mariya Petkova	Women's Discus World Record Holder; 23 May 1983 – 17 August 1984	Succeeded by (East Germany) Irina Meszynski
Sporting positions
Preceded by (East Germany) Irina Meszynski	Women's Discus Best Year Performance; 1983	Succeeded by (Czechoslovakia) Zdeňka Šilhavá
Preceded by (Czechoslovakia) Zdeňka Šilhavá	Women's Discus Best Year Performance; 1985	Succeeded by (East Germany) Diana Gansky
