= Gisela Beyer =

East German discus thrower

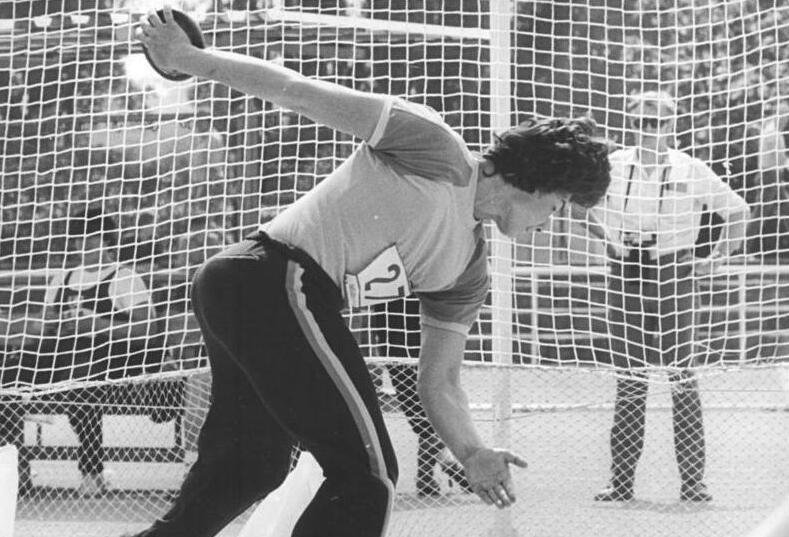
Gisela Beyer (1983)

Gisela Beyer (later Reißmüller; born 16 July 1960 in Stalinstadt, Bezirk Frankfurt) is a retired East German discus thrower.

She finished fourth at the 1980 Summer Olympics, fourth at the 1982 European Championships and fifth at the 1983 World Championships. She represented the sports team ASK Vorwärts Potsdam and became East German champion in 1983 and 1984.

Her personal best throw was 73.10 metres, achieved in July 1984 in Berlin. This result ranks her ninth on the world all-time list and fifth among German discus throwers, behind Gabriele Reinsch, Ilke Wyludda, Diana Gansky-Sachse and Irina Meszynski.

Gisela Beyer is the sister of Olympic gold medalist shot putter Udo Beyer and Olympic gold medalist in handball Hans-Georg Beyer.

== Achievements ==
Year	Competition	Venue	Position	Notes
Representing East Germany
1983	World Championships	Helsinki, Finland	5th	65.26 m
