= Irina Meszynski =

East German discus thrower

Personal information
- Born: 24 March 1962 (age 64) East Berlin, East Germany

Sport
- Sport: Track and field
Medal record
Representing East Germany
European Junior Championships
Gold medal – first place	1979 Bydgoszcz	Discus throw

Irina Meszynski (born 24 March 1962) is a retired East German discus thrower.

On 17 August 1984 Meszynski set a world record in women's discus throw at boycott inspired Friendship Games of 73.36 meters. Her record lasted barely a week before it was bested by Zdeňka Šilhavá with a mark that puts Šilhavá as equal to the number 2 thrower in history. Today, Meszynski's result is enough to occupy the sixth place on the world all-time list and a fourth place on the German all-time list behind Gabriele Reinsch, Ilke Wyludda and Diana Gansky-Sachse.

Her career highlights include a gold medal with 60.30 m at the 1979 European Junior Championships, an eighth place with 63.78 m at the 1982 European Championships in Athletics and a fourth place with 65.20 m at the 1986 European Championships in Athletics. She represented the sports team TSC Berlin and became East German champion in 1982.

She weighed 97 kg, and stood 1.76 m tall.

Records
Preceded by (Soviet Union) Galina Savinkova	Women's Discus World Record Holder; 17 August 1984 – 26 August 1984	Succeeded by (Czechoslovakia) Zdeňka Šilhavá
Sporting positions
Preceded by (East Germany) Evelin Jahl	Women's Discus Best Year Performance; 1982	Succeeded by (Soviet Union) Galina Savinkova
