= Florența Crăciunescu =

Romanian athlete (1955-2008)

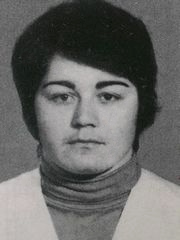

Personal information
- Full name: Florența Țacu-Crăciunescu
- Born: Florența Ionescu; 7 May 1955 Craiova, Romania
- Died: 8 June 2008 (aged 53) Bucharest, Romania
- Height: 1.84 m (6 ft 0 in)
- Weight: 84 kg (185 lb)

Sport
- Sport: Athletics
- Event(s): Discus throw, shot put
- Club: CSM Craiova; CSA Steaua București
- Coached by: Ionel Ghita; Dan Serafim

Achievements and titles
- Personal best(s): DT – 69.50 m (1985); SP – 18.06 m (1983i)
Medal record
Women's Athletics
Representing Romania
Olympic Games
Bronze medal – third place	1984 Los Angeles	Discus
Universiade
Gold medal – first place	1981 Bucharest	Discus
Gold medal – first place	1983 Edmonton	Discus

Florența Crăciunescu (née Ionescu, then Țacu, 7 May 1955 – 8 June 2008) was a Romanian athlete. She won a bronze medal in the discus throw at the 1984 Olympics, finishing sixth in 1980; in 1984 she also placed eighth in the shot put. Her elder sister Carmen Ionesco competed in the same events for Canada at the 1984 Olympics.
