= Discus throw =

Event in track and field athletics

Athletics Discus throw
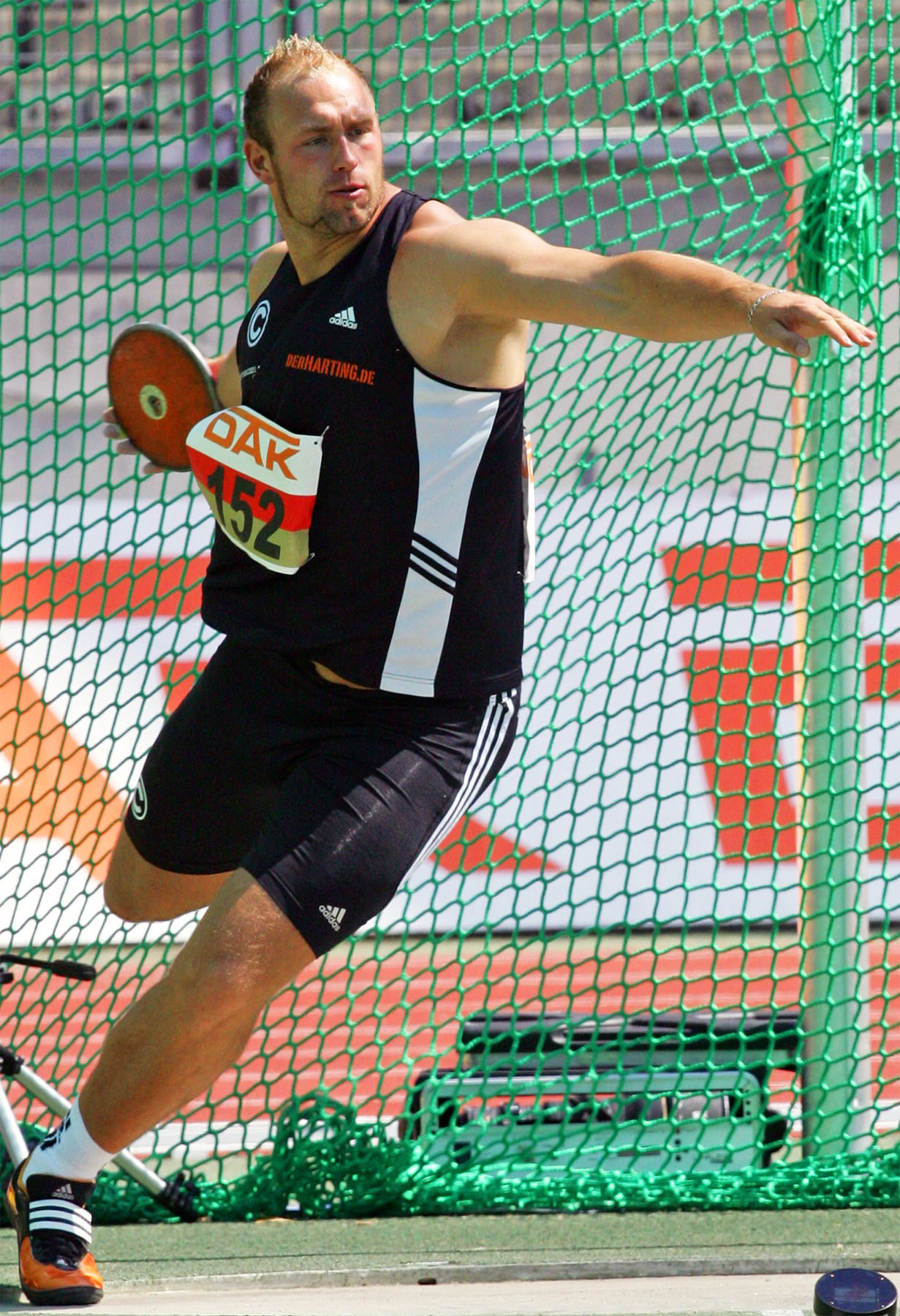
- German 2012 Olympic champion Robert Harting

World records
- Men: Mykolas Alekna (LTU) 75.56 m (247 ft 10 in) (2025)
- Women: Gabriele Reinsch (GDR) 76.80 m (251 ft 11 in) (1988)

Olympic records
- Men: Roje Stona (JAM) 70.00 m (229 ft 7 in) (2024)
- Women: Martina Hellmann (GDR) 72.30 m (237 ft 2 in) (1988)

World Championship records
- Men: Daniel Ståhl (SWE) 71.46 m (234 ft 5 in) (2023)
- Women: Martina Hellmann (GDR) 71.62 m (234 ft 11 in) (1987)

The discus throw, also known as disc throw, is a track and field event in which the participant athlete throws an oblate spheroid weight – called a discus – in an attempt to achieve a farther distance than other competitors. It is an ancient sport originated in ancient Greece, as demonstrated by the fifth-century-BC Myron statue Discobolus. Although not part of the current pentathlon, it was one of the events of the ancient Greek pentathlon, which can be dated back to at least 708 BC, and it is part of the modern decathlon.

== History ==
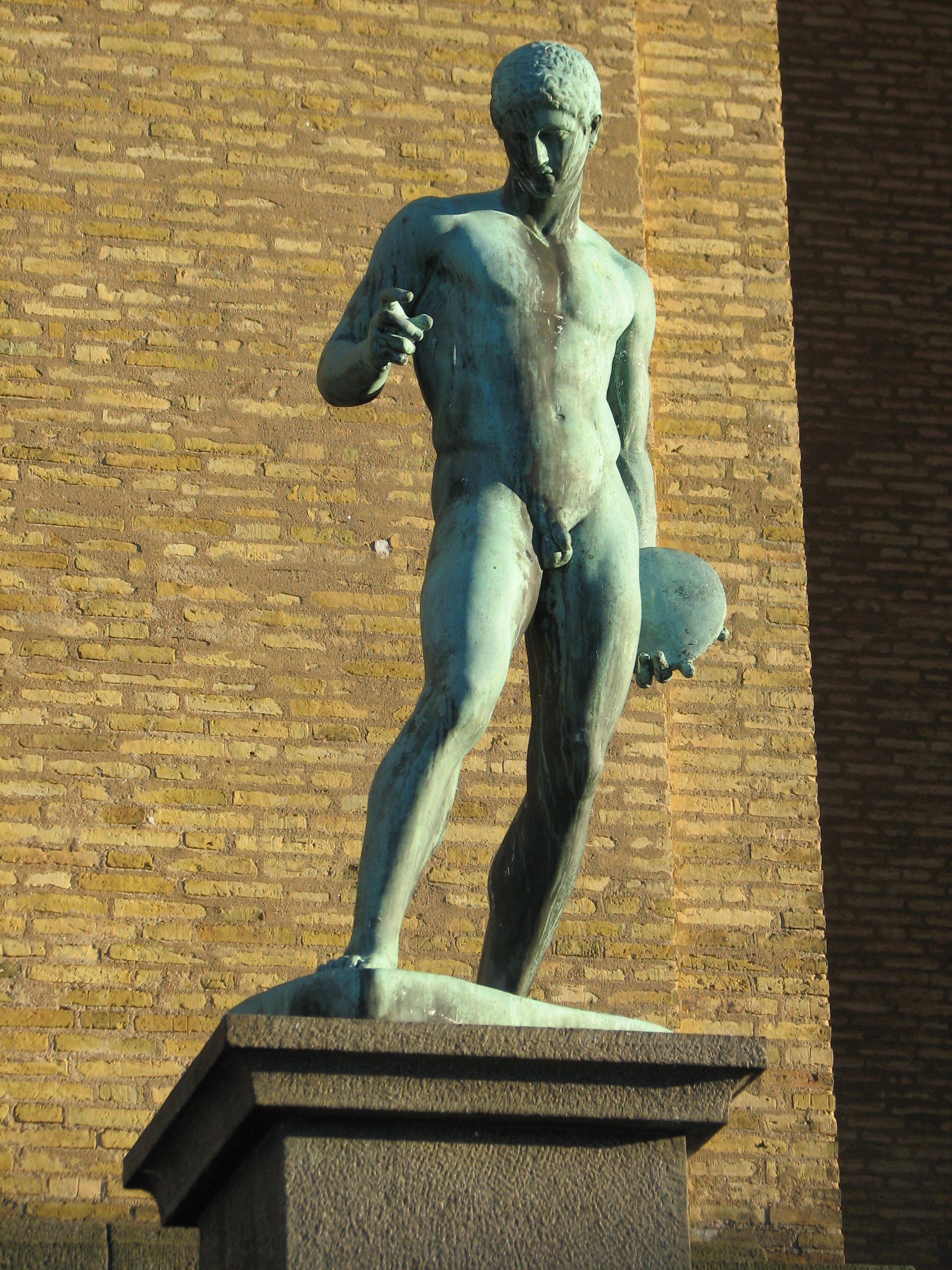
Modern copy of the Diskophoros, attributed to Alkamenes

The sport of throwing the discus traces back to it being an event in the original Olympic Games of Ancient Greece. The discus as a sport was resurrected in Magdeburg, Germany, by gymnastics teacher Christian Georg Kohlrausch and his students in the 1870s. Organized men's competition was resumed in the late 19th century, and has been a part of the modern Summer Olympic Games since the first modern competition, the 1896 Summer Olympics. Images of discus throwers figured prominently in advertising for early modern Games, such as fundraising stamps for the 1896 Games, and the main posters for the 1920 and 1948 Summer Olympics. Today the sport of discus is a routine part of modern track-and-field meets at all levels, and retains a particularly iconic place in the Olympic Games.

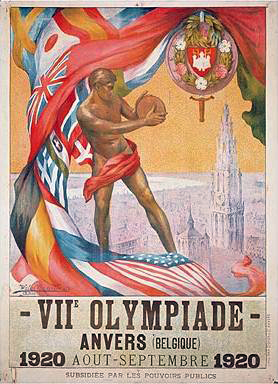
The main poster for the 1920 Summer Olympics

The first modern athlete to throw the discus while rotating the whole body was František Janda-Suk from Bohemia (the present Czech Republic). Janda-Suk invented this technique when studying the position of the statue of Discobolus. After a year of developing the technique, he earned a silver medal in the 1900 Olympics.

Women's competition began in the first decades of the 20th century. Following competition at national and regional levels, it was added to the Olympic program for the 1928 games.

== Regulations ==
The event consists of throwing a heavy disc, with the weight or size depending on the competitor. Men and women throw different sized discs, with varying sizes and weights depending on age. The weight of the discus is either governed by World Athletics for international or USA Track & Field for the United States.

In the United States, Henry Canine advocated for a lighter-weight discus in high school competition. His suggestion was adopted by the National High School Athletic Association in 1938.

US Weights
Age	Men	Women
High School	1.6 kg	1 kg
Collegiate	2 kg	1 kg
Professional	2 kg	1 kg
Master's (35–59)	1.5 kg	1 kg
Master's (60–74)	1 kg	1 kg
Master's (75+)	1 kg	0.75 kg

International Weights
Age	Men	Women
≤17	1.5 kg	1 kg
18–19	1.75 kg	1 kg
20–49	2 kg	1 kg
50–59	1.5 kg	1 kg
60–74	1 kg	1 kg
75+	1 kg	0.75 kg

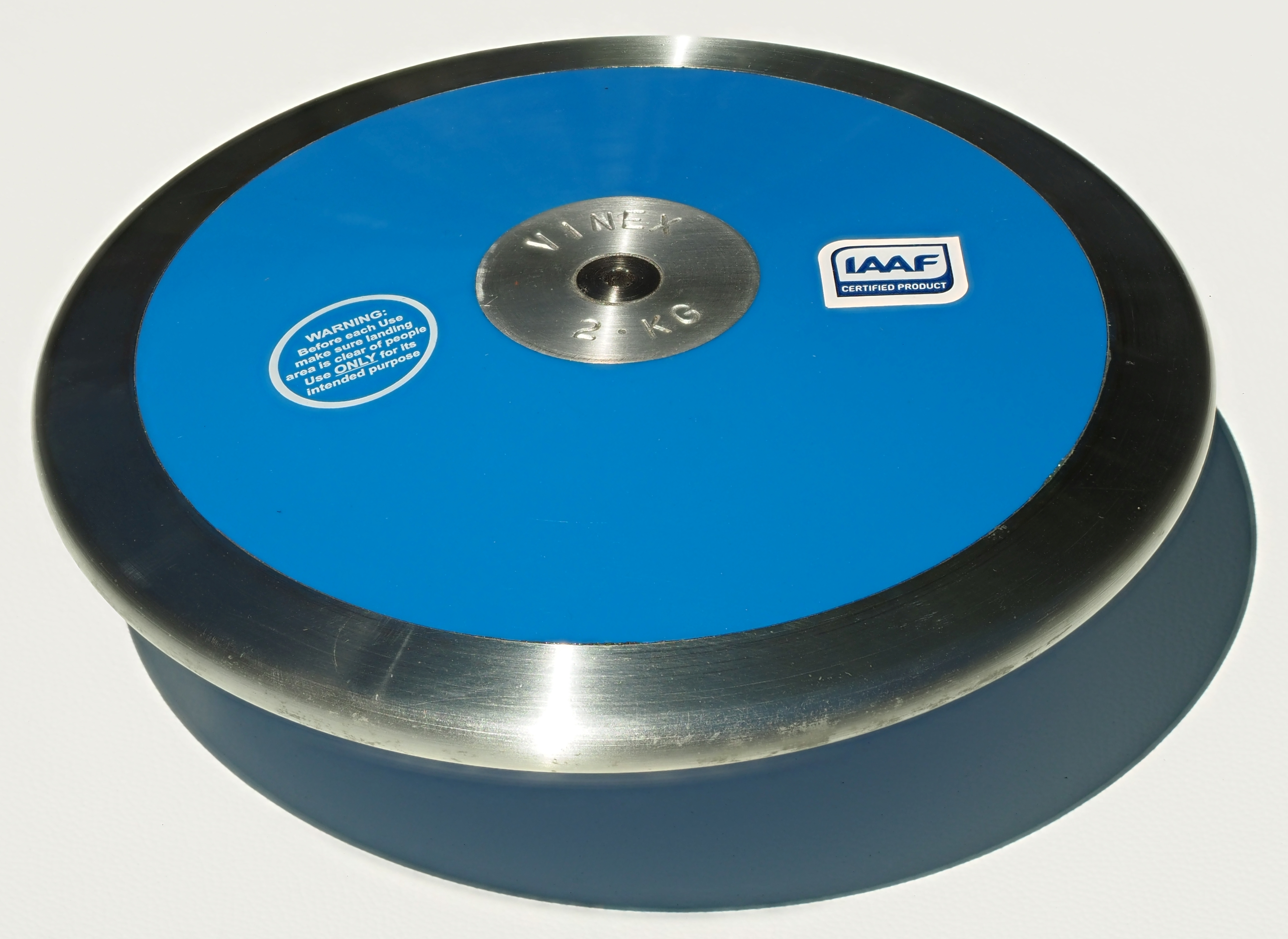
Discus (2 kg), World Athletics certified for competitions

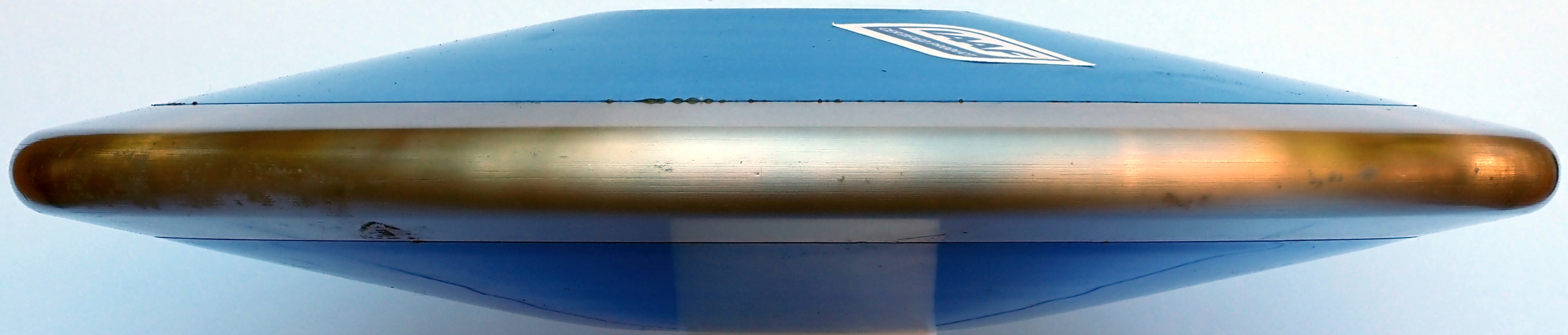
Side view

Longitudinal section (schematic)

The typical discus has sides made of plastic, wood, fiberglass, carbon fiber or metal with a metal rim and a metal core to attain the weight. The rim must be smooth, with no roughness or finger holds. A discus with more weight in the rim produces greater angular momentum for any given spin rate, and thus more stability, although it is more difficult to throw. However, a higher rim weight, if thrown correctly, can lead to a longer throw. In some competitions, a solid rubber discus is used (see in the United States).

To make a throw, the competitor starts in a circle of 2.50 m (8 ft 2 1/4 in) diameter, which is recessed in a concrete pad by 20 millimetres (0.79 in). The thrower typically takes an initial stance facing away from the direction of the throw. They then spin anticlockwise (for right-handers) 1 1/2 times while staying within the circle to build momentum before releasing the discus. The discus must land within a 34.92º circular sector that is centered on the throwing circle. The rules of competition for discus are virtually identical to those of shot put, except that the circle is larger, a stop board is not used and there are no form rules concerning how the discus is to be thrown.

The basic motion is a fore-handed sidearm movement. The discus is spun off the index finger or the middle finger of the throwing hand. In flight the disc spins clockwise when viewed from above for a right-handed thrower, and anticlockwise for a left-handed thrower. As well as achieving maximum momentum in the discus on throwing, the discus' distance is also determined by the trajectory the thrower imparts, as well as the aerodynamic behavior of the discus. Generally, throws into a moderate headwind achieve the maximum distance. Also, a faster-spinning discus imparts greater gyroscopic stability. The technique of discus throwing is quite difficult to master and needs much experience to perfect; thus most top throwers are 30 years old or more.

The discus throw is sometimes contested indoors, but it is not included at the World Athletics Indoor Championships. World Athletics used to keep "world indoor best" discus records, but since 2023 they now combine both indoor and outdoor marks.

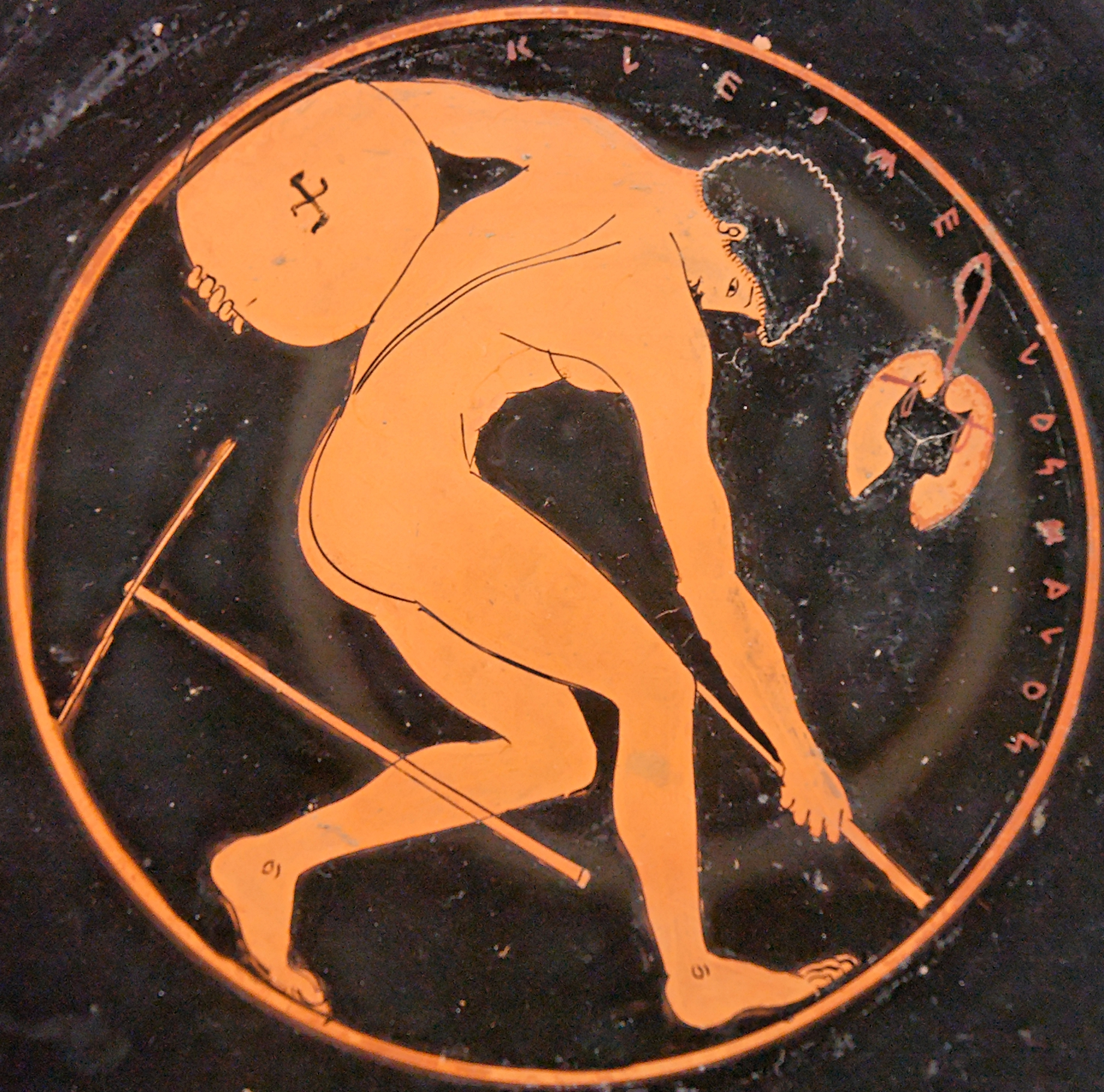
Discus-thrower, tondo of a kylix by the Kleomelos Painter, Louvre Museum

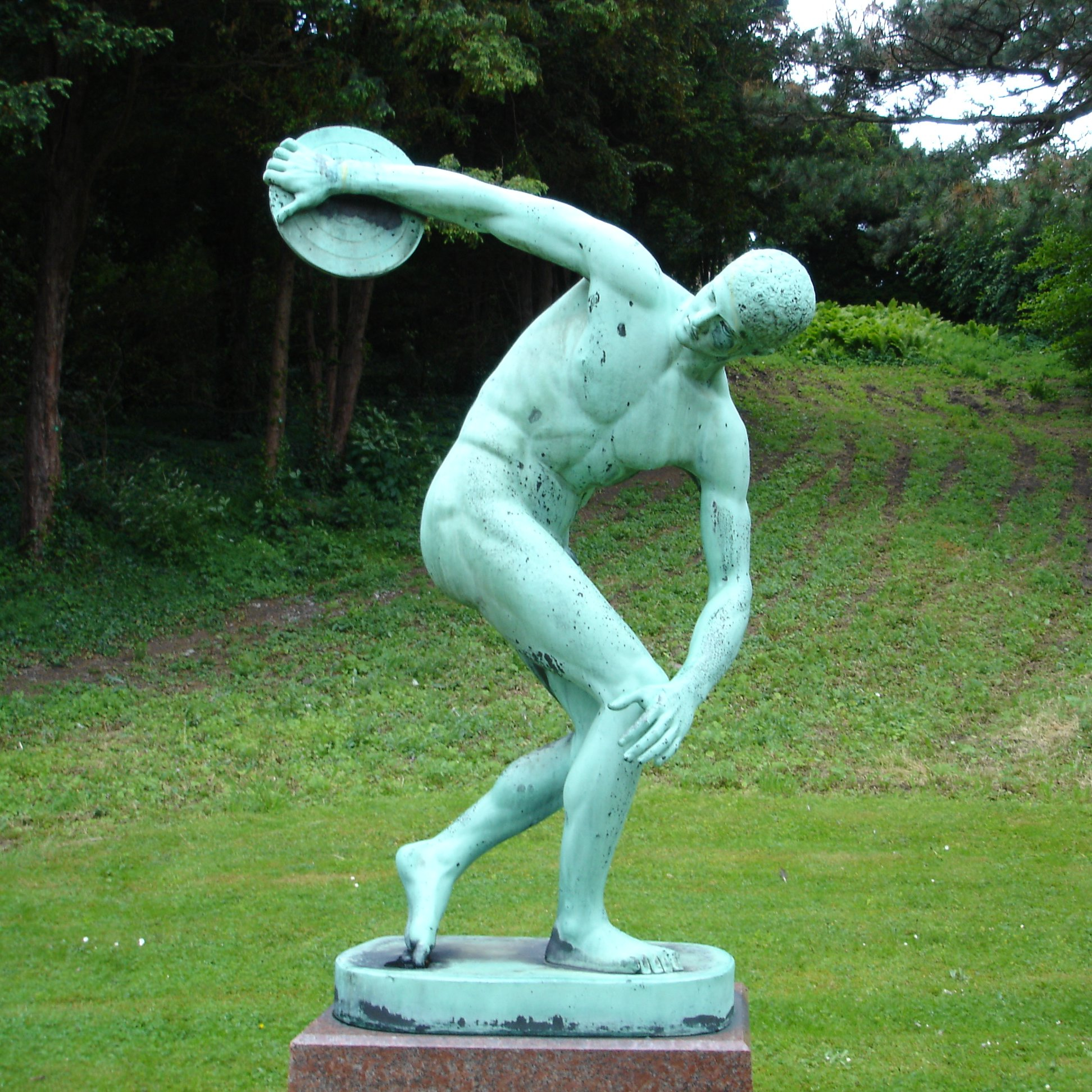
Modern copy of Myron's Discobolus in University of Copenhagen Botanical Garden, Denmark

== Phases ==
The discus technique can be broken down into phases. The purpose is to transfer from the back to the front of the throwing circle while turning through one and a half circles. The speed of delivery is high, and speed is built up during the throw (slow to fast). Correct technique involves the buildup of torque so that maximum force can be applied to the discus on delivery.

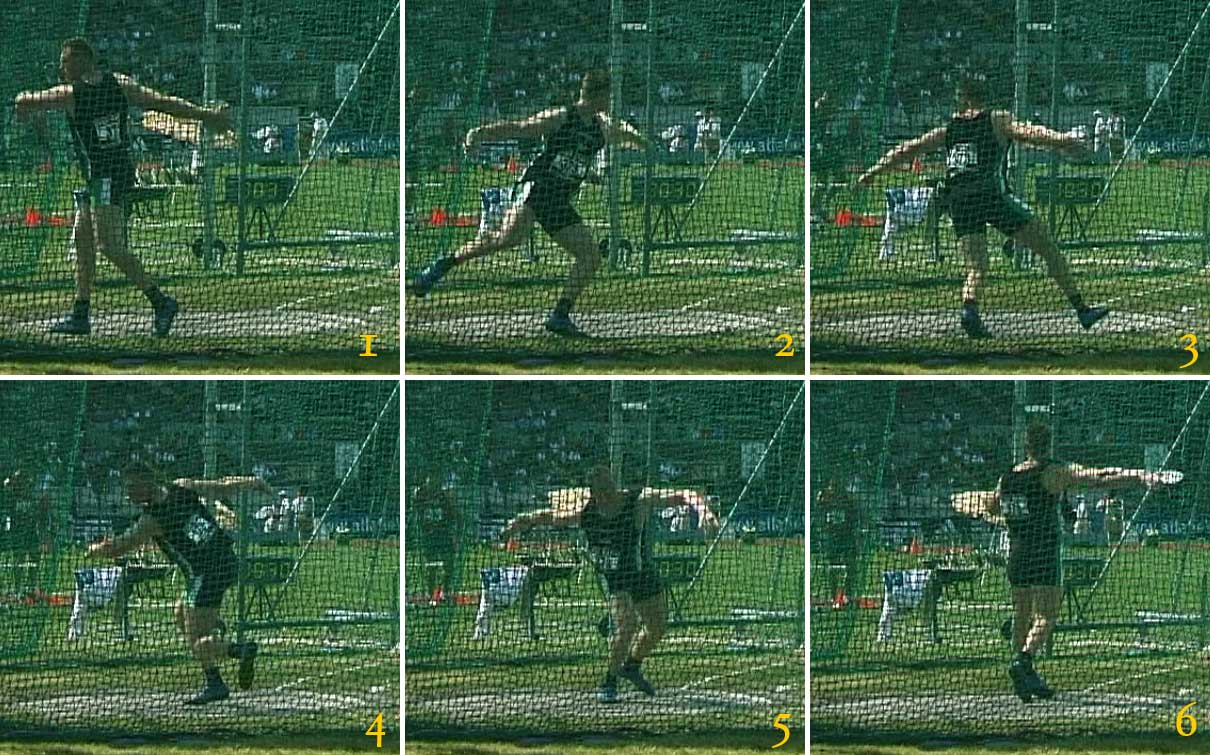
Rutger Smith in phases of the discus throw

Initially, the thrower takes up their position in the throwing circle, distributing their body weight evenly over both feet, which are roughly shoulder width apart. They crouch in order to adopt a more efficient posture to start from whilst also isometrically preloading their muscles; this will allow them to start faster and achieve a more powerful throw. They then begin the wind-up, which sets the tone for the entire throw; the rhythm of the wind-up and throw is very important.

Focusing on rhythm can bring about the consistency to get in the right positions that many throwers lack. Executing a sound discus throw with solid technique requires perfect balance. This is due to the throw being a linear movement combined with a one and a half rotation and an implement at the end of one arm. Thus, a good discus thrower needs to maintain balance within the circle.

For a right handed thrower, the next stage is to move the weight over the left foot. From this position the right foot is raised, and the athlete 'runs' across the circle. There are various techniques for this stage where the leg swings out to a small or great extent. Some athletes turn on their left heel (e.g. Ilke Wyludda), but turning on the ball of the foot is far more common.

The aim is to land in the 'power position'; the right foot should be in the center and the heel should not touch the ground at any point. The left foot should land very quickly after the right. Weight should be mostly over the back foot with as much torque as possible in the body so the right arm is high and far back. This is very hard to achieve.

The critical stage is the delivery of the discus. From the 'power position' the hips drive through hard, and will be facing the direction of the throw on delivery. Athletes employ various techniques to control the end-point and recover from the throw, such as fixing feet (to pretty much stop dead), or an active reverse spinning onto the left foot (e.g. Virgilijus Alekna).

Sports scientist Richard Ganslen researched the Aerodynamics of the Discus, reporting the discus will stall at an angle of 29°.

== Culture ==
The discus throw has been the subject of a number of well-known ancient Greek statues and Roman copies such as the Discobolus and Discophoros. The discus throw also appears repeatedly in ancient Greek mythology, featured as a means of manslaughter in the cases of Hyacinth, Crocus, Phocus, and Acrisius, and as a named event in the funeral games of Patroclus.

Discus throwers have been selected as a main motif in numerous collectors' coins. One of the recent samples is the €10 Greek Discus commemorative coin, minted in 2003 to commemorate the 2004 Summer Olympics. On the obverse of the coin a modern athlete is seen in the foreground in a half-turned position, while in the background an ancient discus thrower has been captured in a lively bending motion, with the discus high above his head, creating a vivid representation of the sport.

== Area records ==
- Updated 21 May 2026.

Area	Men			Women		
Area	Mark	Season	Athlete	Mark	Season	Athlete
World	75.56 m (247 ft 10 in)	2025	Mykolas Alekna (LTU)	76.80 m (251 ft 11 in)	1988	Gabriele Reinsch (GDR)
Area records
Africa (records)	70.32 m (230 ft 8 in)	2002	Frantz Kruger (RSA)	64.96 m (213 ft 1 in)	2023	Chioma Onyekwere (NGR)
Asia (records)	69.32 m (227 ft 5 in)	2008	Ehsan Haddadi (IRI)	71.68 m (235 ft 2 in)	1992	Xiao Yanling (CHN)
Europe (records)	75.56 m (247 ft 10 in)	2025	Mykolas Alekna (LTU)	76.80 m (251 ft 11 in)	1988	Gabriele Reinsch (GDR)
North, Central America and Caribbean (records)	72.45 m (237 ft 8 in)	2026	Sam Mattis (USA)	73.52 m (241 ft 2 in)	2025	Valarie Sion (USA)
Oceania (records)	74.78 m (245 ft 4 in)	2025	Matthew Denny (AUS)	69.64 m (228 ft 5 in)	2017	Dani Stevens (AUS)
South America (records)	70.29 m (230 ft 7 in)	2020	Mauricio Ortega (COL)	65.34 m (214 ft 4 in)	2019	Andressa de Morais (BRA)

== All-time top 25 ==
Tables show data for two definitions of "Top 25" - the top 25 discus throw marks and the top 25 athletes:
- denotes top performance for athletes in the top 25 discus throw marks
- denotes lesser performances, still in the top 25 discus throw marks, by repeat athletes
- denotes top performance (only) for other top 25 athletes who fall outside the top 25 discus throw marks

=== Men ===
- Correct as of August 2026.

Ath.#	Perf.#	Mark	Athlete	Nation	Date	Place	Ref.
1	1	75.56 m (247 ft 10 in)	Mykolas Alekna	Lithuania	13 April 2025	Ramona	
	2	74.89 m (245 ft 8 in)	M. Alekna #2 (Note: Typically only one throw per competition would be included on this list, however due to this throw and the subsequent throw of 75.56 m (247 ft 10 in) both breaking the world record they are given special status and both are included.)		13 April 2025	Ramona	
2	3	74.78 m (245 ft 4 in)	Matthew Denny	Australia	13 April 2025	Ramona	
	4	74.35 m (243 ft 11 in)	M. Alekna #3		14 April 2024	Ramona	
	5	74.25 m (243 ft 7 in)	Denny #2		10 April 2025	Ramona	
3	6	74.08 m (243 ft 0 in)	Jürgen Schult	East Germany	6 June 1986	Neubrandenburg	
	7	74.04 m (242 ft 10 in)	Denny #3		9 April 2026	Ramona	
4	8	74.00 m (242 ft 9 in)	Steven Richter	Germany	9 April 2026	Ramona	
5	9	73.88 m (242 ft 4 in)	Virgilijus Alekna	Lithuania	3 August 2000	Kaunas	
	10	73.58 m (241 ft 4 in)	Denny #4		11 April 2026	Ramona	
6	11	73.38 m (240 ft 8 in)	Gerd Kanter	Estonia	4 September 2006	Helsingborg	
	12	72.65 m (238 ft 4 in)	M. Alekna #4		25 July 2026	Palanga	
7	13	72.61 m (238 ft 2 in)	Kristjan Čeh	Slovenia	9 April 2026	Ramona	
	14	72.58 m (238 ft 1 in)	M. Alekna #5		23 August 2026	Chorzów	
	15	72.56 m (238 ft 0 in)	Čeh #2		12 September 2026	Vilnius	
	16	72.51 m (237 ft 10 in)	Čeh #3		13 August 2026	Birmingham	
	17	72.47 m (237 ft 9 in)	Richter #2		11 April 2026	Ramona	
8	18	72.45 m (237 ft 8 in)	Sam Mattis	United States	9 April 2026	Ramona	
	19	72.36 m (237 ft 4 in)	Čeh #4		31 May 2025	Slovenska Bistrica	
	20	72.34 m (237 ft 4 in)	Čeh #5		24 May 2025	Zagreb	
	21	72.26 m (237 ft 0 in)	Čeh #6		29 March 2026	Ramona	
	22	72.15 m (236 ft 8 in)	M. Alekna #6		2 August 2025	Palanga	
	23	72.12 m (236 ft 7 in)	M. Alekna #7		30 May 2025	College Station	
	24	72.11 m (236 ft 6 in)	Čeh #7		25 May 2025	Ptuj	
	25	72.07 m (236 ft 5 in)	Denny #5		6 April 2025	Ramona	
9		72.01 m (236 ft 3 in)	Ralford Mullings	Jamaica	16 August 2025	Ramona	
10		71.88 m (235 ft 9 in)	Lawrence Okoye	Great Britain	11 April 2026	Ramona	
11		71.86 m (235 ft 9 in)	Yuriy Dumchev	Soviet Union	29 May 1983	Moscow	
11		71.86 m (235 ft 9 in)	Daniel Ståhl	Sweden	29 June 2019	Bottnaryd	
13		71.84 m (235 ft 8 in)	Piotr Małachowski	Poland	8 June 2013	Hengelo	
14		71.70 m (235 ft 2 in)	Róbert Fazekas	Hungary	14 July 2002	Szombathely	
15		71.50 m (234 ft 6 in)	Lars Riedel	Germany	3 May 1997	Wiesbaden	
16		71.48 m (234 ft 6 in)	Alex Rose	Samoa	11 May 2024	Allendale	
17		71.32 m (233 ft 11 in)	Ben Plucknett	United States	4 June 1983	Eugene	
18		71.26 m (233 ft 9 in)	John Powell	United States	9 June 1984	San Jose	
18		71.26 m (233 ft 9 in)	Rickard Bruch	Sweden	15 November 1984	Malmö	
18		71.26 m (233 ft 9 in)	Imrich Bugár	Czechoslovakia	25 May 1985	San Jose	
21		71.22 m (233 ft 7 in)	Ruben Rolvink	Netherlands	31 May 2026	Ramona	
22		71.18 m (233 ft 6 in)	Art Burns	United States	19 July 1983	San Jose	
23		71.16 m (233 ft 5 in)	Wolfgang Schmidt	East Germany	9 August 1978	Berlin	
24		71.14 m (233 ft 4 in)	Anthony Washington	United States	22 May 1996	Salinas	
25		71.06 m (233 ft 1 in)	Luis Delís	Cuba	21 May 1983	Havana	

==== Notable series ====
- Matthew Denny had throws of 71.03, 73.46, 74.25, 72.93, 71.14 and 73.56 at the Oklahoma Throws Series in Ramona on 10 April 2025, becoming the second man to produce six throws above 70 meters in a single competition. He achieved a series average of 72.72 m, which is the best in history.
- Mykolas Alekna had throws of 72.21, 70.32, 72.89, 70.51, 74.35 and 70.50 at the Oklahoma Throws Series in Ramona on 14 April 2024, becoming the first man to produce three throws above 72 meters (and six throws above 70 meters) in a single competition.
- Kristjan Čeh had throws of 71.86, 71.70 and 71.19 in Jõhvi on 16 June 2023 becoming the first man to have three throws above 71 metres in a single competition.
- At the 2019 Diamond League Meeting in Doha, Qatar, Daniel Ståhl became the first man to produce six throws beyond 69.50 in a single competition.

==== Annulled marks ====
- Ben Plucknett also threw a world record of 72.34 in Stockholm on 7 July 1981. This performance was annulled due to doping offences.

==== Non-legal marks ====
- Rickard Bruch also threw 72.18 at an exhibition meeting in Piteå on 23 July 1974.
- John Powell also threw 72.08 in Klagshamn on 11 September 1987, but the throw was made onto a sloping/downhill sector.

=== Women ===
- Correct as of July 2026.

Ath.#	Perf.#	Mark	Athlete	Nation	Date	Place	Ref.
1	1	76.80 m (251 ft 11 in)	Gabriele Reinsch	East Germany	9 July 1988	Neubrandenburg	
2	2	74.56 m (244 ft 7 in)	Zdeňka Šilhavá	Czechoslovakia	26 August 1984	Nitra	
2	2	74.56 m (244 ft 7 in)	Ilke Wyludda	East Germany	23 July 1989	Neubrandenburg	
	4	74.44 m (244 ft 2 in)	Reinsch #2		13 September 1988	Berlin	
	5	74.40 m (244 ft 1 in)	Wyludda #2		13 September 1988	Berlin	
4	6	74.08 m (243 ft 0 in)	Diana Gansky	East Germany	20 June 1987	Karl-Marx-Stadt	
	7	73.90 m (242 ft 5 in)	Gansky #2		27 June 1987	Prague	
5	8	73.84 m (242 ft 3 in)	Daniela Costian	Romania	30 April 1988	Bucharest	
	9	73.78 m (242 ft 0 in)	Costian #2		24 April 1988	Bucharest	
6	10	73.52 m (241 ft 2 in)	Valarie Allman	United States	12 April 2025	Ramona	
	11	73.42 m (240 ft 10 in)	Reinsch #3		12 June 1988	Karl-Marx-Stadt	
7	12	73.36 m (240 ft 8 in)	Irina Meszynski	East Germany	17 August 1984	Prague	
	13	73.32 m (240 ft 6 in)	Gansky #2		11 June 1987	Neubrandenburg	
8	14	73.28 m (240 ft 5 in)	Galina Savinkova	Soviet Union	8 September 1984	Donetsk	
	15	73.26 m (240 ft 4 in)	Savinkova #2		22 May 1983	Leselidze	
	15	73.26 m (240 ft 4 in)	Gansky #3		6 June 1986	Neubrandenburg	
	17	73.24 m (240 ft 3 in)	Gansky #4		29 May 1987	Leipzig	
9	18	73.22 m (240 ft 2 in)	Tsvetanka Khristova	Bulgaria	19 April 1987	Kazanlak	
	19	73.16 m (240 ft 0 in)	Wyludda #3		13 September 1988	Berlin	
10	20	73.10 m (239 ft 9 in)	Gisela Beyer	East Germany	20 July 1984	Berlin	
	20	73.10 m (239 ft 9 in)	Allman #2		11 April 2026	Ramona	
11	22	73.09 m (239 ft 9 in)	Yaime Pérez	Cuba	13 April 2024	Ramona	
	23	73.04 m (239 ft 7 in)	Gansky #5		6 June 1987	Potsdam	
	23	73.04 m (239 ft 7 in)	Wyludda #4		5 August 1989	Gateshead	
	25	72.96 m (239 ft 4 in)	Savinkova #3		23 June 1985	Erfurt	
12		72.92 m (239 ft 2 in)	Martina Hellmann	East Germany	20 August 1987	Potsdam	
13		72.14 m (236 ft 8 in)	Galina Murashova	Soviet Union	17 August 1984	Prague	
14		71.80 m (235 ft 6 in)	Mariya Vergova	Bulgaria	13 July 1980	Sofia	
15		71.72 m (235 ft 3 in)	Cierra Jackson	United States	18 July 2026	London	
16		71.68 m (235 ft 2 in)	Xiao Yanling	China	14 March 1992	Beijing	
17		71.58 m (234 ft 10 in)	Ellina Zvereva	Soviet Union	12 June 1988	Leningrad	
18		71.50 m (234 ft 6 in)	Evelin Jahl	East Germany	10 May 1980	Potsdam	
19		71.41 m (234 ft 3 in)	Sandra Perković	Croatia	18 July 2017	Bellinzona	
20		71.30 m (233 ft 11 in)	Larisa Korotkevich	Russia	29 May 1992	Sochi	
21		71.22 m (233 ft 7 in)	Ria Stalman	Netherlands	15 July 1984	Walnut	
22		70.99 m (232 ft 10 in)	Jorinde van Klinken	Netherlands	11 April 2026	Ramona	
23		70.88 m (232 ft 6 in)	Hilda Ramos	Cuba	8 May 1992	Havana	
24		70.80 m (232 ft 3 in)	Larisa Mikhalchenko	Soviet Union	18 June 1988	Kharkiv	
25		70.72 m (232 ft 0 in)	Laulauga Tausaga	United States	12 April 2025	Ramona	

==== Annulled marks ====
- Daniela Costian of Romania threw a best of 73.48 in Bucharest on 30 April 1988. This performance was annulled due to doping offences.

==== Non-legal marks ====
- Martina Hellmann also threw 78.14 at an unofficial meeting in Berlin on 6 September 1988.
- Ilke Wyludda also threw 75.36 at an unofficial meeting in Berlin on 6 September 1988.

== Olympic medalists ==
=== Men ===
Games	Gold	Silver	Bronze
1896 Athens	Robert Garrett; United States	Panagiotis Paraskevopoulos; Greece	Sotirios Versis; Greece
1900 Paris	Rudolf Bauer; Hungary	František Janda-Suk; Bohemia	Richard Sheldon; United States
1904 St. Louis	Martin Sheridan; United States	Ralph Rose; United States	Nikolaos Georgantas; Greece
1908 London	Martin Sheridan; United States	Merritt Giffin; United States	Bill Horr; United States
1912 Stockholm	Armas Taipale; Finland	Richard Byrd; United States	James Duncan; United States
1920 Antwerp	Elmer Niklander; Finland	Armas Taipale; Finland	Gus Pope; United States
1924 Paris	Bud Houser; United States	Vilho Niittymaa; Finland	Thomas Lieb; United States
1928 Amsterdam	Bud Houser; United States	Antero Kivi; Finland	James Corson; United States
1932 Los Angeles	John Anderson; United States	Henri LaBorde; United States	Paul Winter; France
1936 Berlin	Ken Carpenter; United States	Gordon Dunn; United States	Giorgio Oberweger; Italy
1948 London	Adolfo Consolini; Italy	Giuseppe Tosi; Italy	Fortune Gordien; United States
1952 Helsinki	Sim Iness; United States	Adolfo Consolini; Italy	James Dillion; United States
1956 Melbourne	Al Oerter; United States	Fortune Gordien; United States	Des Koch; United States
1960 Rome	Al Oerter; United States	Rink Babka; United States	Dick Cochran; United States
1964 Tokyo	Al Oerter; United States	Ludvík Daněk; Czechoslovakia	Dave Weill; United States
1968 Mexico City	Al Oerter; United States	Lothar Milde; East Germany	Ludvík Daněk; Czechoslovakia
1972 Munich	Ludvík Daněk; Czechoslovakia	Jay Silvester; United States	Ricky Bruch; Sweden
1976 Montreal	Mac Wilkins; United States	Wolfgang Schmidt; East Germany	John Powell; United States
1980 Moscow	Viktor Rashchupkin; Soviet Union	Imrich Bugár; Czechoslovakia	Luis Delís; Cuba
1984 Los Angeles	Rolf Danneberg; West Germany	Mac Wilkins; United States	John Powell; United States
1988 Seoul	Jürgen Schult; East Germany	Romas Ubartas; Soviet Union	Rolf Danneberg; West Germany
1992 Barcelona	Romas Ubartas; Lithuania	Jürgen Schult; Germany	Roberto Moya; Cuba
1996 Atlanta	Lars Riedel; Germany	Vladimir Dubrovshchik; Belarus	Vasiliy Kaptyukh; Belarus
2000 Sydney	Virgilijus Alekna; Lithuania	Lars Riedel; Germany	Frantz Kruger; South Africa
2004 Athens	Virgilijus Alekna; Lithuania	Zoltán Kővágó; Hungary	Aleksander Tammert; Estonia
2008 Beijing	Gerd Kanter; Estonia	Piotr Małachowski; Poland	Virgilijus Alekna; Lithuania
2012 London	Robert Harting; Germany	Ehsan Haddadi; Iran	Gerd Kanter; Estonia
2016 Rio de Janeiro	Christoph Harting; Germany	Piotr Małachowski; Poland	Daniel Jasinski; Germany
2020 Tokyo	Daniel Ståhl; Sweden	Simon Pettersson; Sweden	Lukas Weißhaidinger; Austria
2024 Paris	Roje Stona; Jamaica	Mykolas Alekna; Lithuania	Matthew Denny; Australia
2028 Los Angeles			

=== Women ===
Games	Gold	Silver	Bronze
1928 Amsterdam	Halina Konopacka; Poland	Lillian Copeland; United States	Ruth Svedberg; Sweden
1932 Los Angeles	Lillian Copeland; United States	Ruth Osburn; United States	Jadwiga Wajs; Poland
1936 Berlin	Gisela Mauermayer; Germany	Jadwiga Wajs; Poland	Paula Mollenhauer; Germany
1948 London	Micheline Ostermeyer; France	Edera Gentile; Italy	Jacqueline Mazéas; France
1952 Helsinki	Nina Romashkova; Soviet Union	Yelisaveta Bagriantseva; Soviet Union	Nina Dumbadze; Soviet Union
1956 Melbourne	Olga Fikotová; Czechoslovakia	Irina Beglyakova; Soviet Union	Nina Romashkova; Soviet Union
1960 Rome	Nina Romashkova; Soviet Union	Tamara Press; Soviet Union	Lia Manoliu; Romania
1964 Tokyo	Tamara Press; Soviet Union	Ingrid Lotz; United Team of Germany	Lia Manoliu; Romania
1968 Mexico City	Lia Manoliu; Romania	Liesel Westermann; West Germany	Jolán Kleiber-Kontsek; Hungary
1972 Munich	Faina Melnik; Soviet Union	Argentina Menis; Romania	Vasilka Stoeva; Bulgaria
1976 Montreal	Evelin Schlaak; East Germany	Mariya Vergova; Bulgaria	Gabriele Hinzmann; East Germany
1980 Moscow	Evelin Jahl; East Germany	Mariya Petkova; Bulgaria	Tatyana Lesovaya; Soviet Union
1984 Los Angeles	Ria Stalman; Netherlands	Leslie Deniz; United States	Florența Crăciunescu; Romania
1988 Seoul	Martina Hellmann; East Germany	Diana Gansky; East Germany	Tsvetanka Khristova; Bulgaria
1992 Barcelona	Maritza Martén; Cuba	Tsvetanka Khristova; Bulgaria	Daniela Costian; Australia
1996 Atlanta	Ilke Wyludda; Germany	Natalya Sadova; Russia	Ellina Zvereva; Belarus
2000 Sydney	Ellina Zvereva; Belarus	Anastasia Kelesidou; Greece	Iryna Yatchenko; Belarus
2004 Athens	Natalya Sadova; Russia	Anastasia Kelesidou; Greece	Věra Pospíšilová-Cechlová; Czech Republic
2008 Beijing	Stephanie Brown Trafton; United States	Olena Antonova; Ukraine	Song Aimin; China
2012 London	Sandra Perković; Croatia	Li Yanfeng; China	Yarelys Barrios; Cuba
2016 Rio de Janeiro	Sandra Perković; Croatia	Mélina Robert-Michon; France	Denia Caballero; Cuba
2020 Tokyo	Valarie Allman; United States	Kristin Pudenz; Germany	Yaime Pérez; Cuba
2024 Paris	Valarie Allman; United States	Feng Bin; China	Sandra Elkasević; Croatia

== World Championships medalists ==
=== Men ===
Championships	Gold	Silver	Bronze
1983 Helsinki	Imrich Bugár (TCH)	Luis Delís (CUB)	Géjza Valent (TCH)
1987 Rome	Jürgen Schult (GDR)	John Powell (USA)	Luis Delís (CUB)
1991 Tokyo	Lars Riedel (GER)	Erik de Bruin (NED)	Attila Horváth (HUN)
1993 Stuttgart	Lars Riedel (GER)	Dmitry Shevchenko (RUS)	Jürgen Schult (GER)
1995 Gothenburg	Lars Riedel (GER)	Vladimir Dubrovshchik (BLR)	Vasiliy Kaptyukh (BLR)
1997 Athens	Lars Riedel (GER)	Virgilijus Alekna (LTU)	Jürgen Schult (GER)
1999 Seville	Anthony Washington (discus thrower) (USA)	Jürgen Schult (GER)	Lars Riedel (GER)
2001 Edmonton	Lars Riedel (GER)	Virgilijus Alekna (LTU)	Michael Möllenbeck (GER)
2003 Saint-Denis	Virgilijus Alekna (LTU)	Róbert Fazekas (HUN)	Vasiliy Kaptyukh (BLR)
2005 Helsinki	Virgilijus Alekna (LTU)	Gerd Kanter (EST)	Michael Möllenbeck (GER)
2007 Osaka	Gerd Kanter (EST)	Robert Harting (GER)	Rutger Smith (NED)
2009 Berlin	Robert Harting (GER)	Piotr Małachowski (POL)	Gerd Kanter (EST)
2011 Daegu	Robert Harting (GER)	Gerd Kanter (EST)	Ehsan Haddadi (IRI)
2013 Moscow	Robert Harting (GER)	Piotr Małachowski (POL)	Gerd Kanter (EST)
2015 Beijing	Piotr Małachowski (POL)	Philip Milanov (BEL)	Robert Urbanek (POL)
2017 London	Andrius Gudžius (LTU)	Daniel Ståhl (SWE)	Mason Finley (USA)
2019 Doha	Daniel Ståhl (SWE)	Fedrick Dacres (JAM)	Lukas Weißhaidinger (AUT)
2022 Eugene	Kristjan Čeh (SLO)	Mykolas Alekna (LTU)	Andrius Gudžius (LTU)
2023 Budapest	Daniel Ståhl (SWE)	Kristjan Čeh (SLO)	Mykolas Alekna (LTU)
2025 Tokyo	Daniel Ståhl (SWE)	Mykolas Alekna (LTU)	Alex Rose (SAM)

=== Women ===
Championships	Gold	Silver	Bronze
1983 Helsinki	Martina Opitz (GDR)	Galina Murašova (URS)	Mariya Petkova (BUL)
1987 Rome	Martina Hellmann (GDR)	Diana Gansky (GDR)	Tsvetanka Khristova (BUL)
1991 Tokyo	Tsvetanka Khristova (BUL)	Ilke Wyludda (GER)	Larisa Mikhalchenko (URS)
1993 Stuttgart	Olga Chernyavskaya (RUS)	Daniela Costian (AUS)	Min Chunfeng (CHN)
1995 Gothenburg	Ellina Zvereva (BLR)	Ilke Wyludda (GER)	Olga Chernyavskaya (RUS)
1997 Athens	Beatrice Faumuina (NZL)	Ellina Zvereva (BLR)	Natalya Sadova (RUS)
1999 Seville	Franka Dietzsch (GER)	Anastasia Kelesidou (GRE)	Nicoleta Grasu (ROU)
2001 Edmonton	Ellina Zvereva (BLR)	Nicoleta Grasu (ROU)	Anastasia Kelesidou (GRE)
2003 Saint-Denis	Iryna Yatchenko (BLR)	Anastasia Kelesidou (GRE)	Ekaterini Voggoli (GRE)
2005 Helsinki	Franka Dietzsch (GER)	Natalya Sadova (RUS)	Věra Pospíšilová-Cechlová (CZE)
2007 Osaka	Franka Dietzsch (GER)	Yarelis Barrios (CUB)	Nicoleta Grasu (ROU)
2009 Berlin	Dani Samuels (AUS)	Yarelis Barrios (CUB)	Nicoleta Grasu (ROU)
2011 Daegu	Li Yanfeng (CHN)	Nadine Müller (GER)	Yarelis Barrios (CUB)
2013 Moscow	Sandra Perković (CRO)	Mélina Robert-Michon (FRA)	Yarelis Barrios (CUB)
2015 Beijing	Denia Caballero (CUB)	Sandra Perković (CRO)	Nadine Müller (GER)
2017 London	Sandra Perković (CRO)	Dani Stevens (AUS)	Mélina Robert-Michon (FRA)
2019 Doha	Yaime Pérez (CUB)	Denia Caballero (CUB)	Sandra Perković (CRO)
2022 Eugene	Feng Bin (CHN)	Sandra Perković (CRO)	Valarie Allman (USA)
2023 Budapest	Laulauga Tausaga (USA)	Valarie Allman (USA)	Feng Bin (CHN)
2025 Tokyo	Valarie Allman (USA)	Jorinde van Klinken (NED)	Silinda Morales (CUB)

== World leading marks ==
=== Men ===
Year	Mark	Athlete	Place
1968	68.40 m (224 ft 4 in)	Jay Silvester (USA)	Reno
1969	68.06 m (223 ft 3 in)	Rickard Bruch (SWE)	Malmö
1970	67.14 m (220 ft 3 in)	Rickard Bruch (SWE)	Malmö
1971	70.38 m (230 ft 10 in)	Jay Silvester (USA)	Lancaster
1972	68.40 m (224 ft 4 in)	Rickard Bruch (SWE)	Stockholm
1973	67.58 m (221 ft 8 in)	Rickard Bruch (SWE)	Skellefteå
1974	68.16 m (223 ft 7 in)	Rickard Bruch (SWE)	Helsingborg
1975	69.08 m (226 ft 7 in)	John Powell (USA)	Long Beach
1976	70.86 m (232 ft 5 in)	Mac Wilkins (USA)	San Jose
1977	69.20 m (227 ft 0 in)	Mac Wilkins (USA)	Westwood
1978	71.16 m (233 ft 5 in)	Wolfgang Schmidt (GDR)	Berlin
1979	70.66 m (231 ft 9 in)	Mac Wilkins (USA)	Walnut
1980	70.98 m (232 ft 10 in)	Mac Wilkins (USA)	Erfurt
1981	69.98 m (229 ft 7 in)	John Powell (USA)	Modesto
1982	70.58 m (231 ft 6 in)	Luis Delís (CUB)	Salinas
1983	71.86 m (235 ft 9 in)	Yuriy Dumchev (RUS)	Moskva
1984	71.26 m (233 ft 9 in)	John Powell (USA)	San Jose
1984	71.26 m (233 ft 9 in)	Ricky Bruch (SWE)	Malmö
1985	71.26 m (233 ft 9 in)	Imrich Bugár (TCH)	San Jose
1986	74.08 m (243 ft 0 in)	Jürgen Schult (GDR)	Neubrandenburg
1987	69.52 m (228 ft 1 in)	Jürgen Schult (GDR)	Neubrandenburg
1988	70.46 m (231 ft 2 in)	Jürgen Schult (GDR)	Berlin
1989	70.92 m (232 ft 8 in)	Wolfgang Schmidt (FRG)	Norden
1990	68.94 m (226 ft 2 in)	Romas Ubartas (LTU)	Smalininkai
1991	69.36 m (227 ft 6 in)	Mike Buncic (USA)	Fresno
1992	69.04 m (226 ft 6 in)	Jürgen Schult (GER)	Halle
1993	68.42 m (224 ft 5 in)	Lars Riedel (GER)	Jena
1994	68.58 m (225 ft 0 in)	Attila Horváth (HUN)	Budapest
1995	69.08 m (226 ft 7 in)	Lars Riedel (GER)	Bellinzona
1995	69.08 m (226 ft 7 in)	Lars Riedel (GER)	Monaco
1996	71.14 m (233 ft 4 in)	Anthony Washington (USA)	Salinas
1997	71.50 m (234 ft 6 in)	Lars Riedel (GER)	Wiesbaden
1998	69.91 m (229 ft 4 in)	John Godina (USA)	Salinas
1999	69.18 m (226 ft 11 in)	Lars Riedel (GER)	Jena
2000	73.88 m (242 ft 4 in)	Virgilijus Alekna (LTU)	Kaunas
2001	70.99 m (232 ft 10 in)	Virgilijus Alekna (LTU)	Stellenbosch
2002	71.70 m (235 ft 2 in)	Róbert Fazekas (HUN)	Szombathely
2003	70.78 m (232 ft 2 in)	Róbert Fazekas (HUN)	Budapest
2004	70.97 m (232 ft 10 in)	Virgilijus Alekna (LTU)	Rethimno
2005	70.67 m (231 ft 10 in)	Virgilijus Alekna (LTU)	Madrid
2006	73.38 m (240 ft 8 in)	Gerd Kanter (EST)	Helsingborg
2007	72.02 m (236 ft 3 in)	Gerd Kanter (EST)	Salinas
2008	71.88 m (235 ft 9 in)	Gerd Kanter (EST)	Salinas
2009	71.64 m (235 ft 0 in)	Gerd Kanter (EST)	Kohila
2010	71.45 m (234 ft 4 in)	Gerd Kanter (EST)	Chula Vista
2011	69.50 m (228 ft 0 in)	Zoltán Kővágó (HUN)	Budapest
2012	70.66 m (231 ft 9 in)	Robert Harting (GER)	Turnov
2013	71.84 m (235 ft 8 in)	Piotr Małachowski (POL)	Hengelo
2014	69.28 m (227 ft 3 in)	Piotr Małachowski (POL)	Halle
2015	68.29 m (224 ft 0 in)	Piotr Małachowski (POL)	Cetniewo
2016	68.72 m (225 ft 5 in)	Daniel Ståhl (SWE)	Sollentuna
2017	71.29 m (233 ft 10 in)	Daniel Ståhl (SWE)	Sollentuna
2018	69.72 m (228 ft 8 in)	Daniel Ståhl (SWE)	Eskilstuna
2019	71.86 m (235 ft 9 in)	Daniel Ståhl (SWE)	Bottnaryd
2020	71.37 m (234 ft 1 in)	Daniel Ståhl (SWE)	Sollentuna
2021	71.40 m (234 ft 3 in)	Daniel Ståhl (SWE)	Bottnaryd
2022	71.47 m (234 ft 5 in)	Daniel Ståhl (SWE)	Uppsala
2023	71.86 m (235 ft 9 in)	Kristjan Čeh (SLO)	Jöhvi
2024	74.35 m (243 ft 11 in)	Mykolas Alekna (LIT)	Ramona
2025	75.56 m (247 ft 10 in)	Mykolas Alekna (LIT)	Ramona
2026	74.04 m (242 ft 10 in)	Matthew Denny (AUS)	Ramona

=== Women ===
Year	Mark	Athlete	Place
1968	62.54 m (205 ft 2 in)	Liesel Westermann (FRG)	Werdohl
1969	63.96 m (209 ft 10 in)	Liesel Westermann (FRG)	Hamburg
1970	63.66 m (208 ft 10 in)	Karin Illgen (GDR)	Leipzig
1971	64.88 m (212 ft 10 in)	Faina Melnik (URS)	Munich
1972	67.32 m (220 ft 10 in)	Argentina Menis (ROU)	Constanța
1973	69.48 m (227 ft 11 in)	Faina Melnik (URS)	Edinburgh
1974	69.90 m (229 ft 3 in)	Faina Melnik (URS)	Prague
1975	70.20 m (230 ft 3 in)	Faina Melnik (URS)	Zürich
1976	70.50 m (231 ft 3 in)	Faina Melnik (URS)	Sochi
1977	68.92 m (226 ft 1 in)	Sabine Engel (GDR)	Karl-Marx-Stadt
1978	70.72 m (232 ft 0 in)	Evelin Jahl (GDR)	Dresden
1979	69.82 m (229 ft 0 in)	Evelin Jahl (GDR)	Leipzig
1980	71.80 m (235 ft 6 in)	Mariya Petkova (BUL)	Sofia
1981	71.46 m (234 ft 5 in)	Evelin Jahl (GDR)	Berlin
1982	71.40 m (234 ft 3 in)	Irina Meszynski (GDR)	Karl-Marx-Stadt
1983	73.26 m (240 ft 4 in)	Galina Savinkova (URS)	Leselidze
1984	74.56 m (244 ft 7 in)	Zdeňka Šilhavá (TCH)	Nitra
1985	72.96 m (239 ft 4 in)	Galina Savinkova (URS)	Erfurt
1986	73.26 m (240 ft 4 in)	Diana Gansky (GDR)	Neubrandenburg
1987	74.08 m (243 ft 0 in)	Diana Gansky (GDR)	Karl-Marx-Stadt
1988	76.80 m (251 ft 11 in)	Gabriele Reinsch (GDR)	Neubrandenburg
1989	74.56 m (244 ft 7 in)	Ilke Wyludda (GDR)	Neubrandenburg
1990	71.10 m (233 ft 3 in)	Ilke Wyludda (GDR)	Tel Aviv
1991	71.02 m (233 ft 0 in)	Tsvetanka Khristova (BUL)	Tokyo
1992	71.68 m (235 ft 2 in)	Xiao Yanling (CHN)	Beijing
1993	68.14 m (223 ft 6 in)	Larisa Korotkevich (RUS)	Vénissieux
1994	68.58 m (225 ft 0 in)	Daniela Costian (AUS)	Auckland
1995	69.68 m (228 ft 7 in)	Mette Bergmann (NOR)	Florø
1996	69.66 m (228 ft 6 in)	Ilke Wyludda (GER)	Atlanta
1997	70.00 m (229 ft 7 in)	Xiao Yanling (CHN)	Shanghai
1998	68.91 m (226 ft 0 in)	Franka Dietzsch (GER)	Stendal
1999	70.02 m (229 ft 8 in)	Natalya Sadova (RUS)	Thessaloníki
2000	68.70 m (225 ft 4 in)	Nicoleta Grasu (ROU)	Bucharest
2001	68.57 m (224 ft 11 in)	Natalya Sadova (RUS)	Edmonton
2002	67.73 m (222 ft 2 in)	Natalya Sadova (RUS)	Tula
2003	69.38 m (227 ft 7 in)	Natalya Sadova (RUS)	Halle
2004	69.14 m (226 ft 10 in)	Irina Yatchenko (BLR)	Minsk
2005	66.81 m (219 ft 2 in)	Vera Cechlová (CZE)	Madrid
2006	68.51 m (224 ft 9 in)	Franka Dietzsch (GER)	Schönebeck
2007	68.06 m (223 ft 3 in)	Franka Dietzsch (GER)	Halle
2008	66.51 m (218 ft 2 in)	Nicoleta Grasu (ROU)	Istanbul
2009	66.40 m (217 ft 10 in)	Li Yanfeng (CHN)	Jinan
2010	67.78 m (222 ft 4 in)	Nadine Müller (GER)	Wiesbaden
2011	67.98 m (223 ft 0 in)	Li Yanfeng (CHN)	Schönebeck
2012	69.11 m (226 ft 8 in)	Sandra Perković (CRO)	London
2013	68.96 m (226 ft 2 in)	Sandra Perković (CRO)	Lausanne
2014	71.08 m (233 ft 2 in)	Sandra Perković (CRO)	Zürich
2015	70.65 m (231 ft 9 in)	Denia Caballero (CUB)	Bilbao
2016	70.88 m (232 ft 6 in)	Sandra Perković (CRO)	Shanghai
2017	71.41 m (234 ft 3 in)	Sandra Perković (CRO)	Barcelona
2018	71.38 m (234 ft 2 in)	Sandra Perković (CRO)	Doha
2019	69.39 m (227 ft 7 in)	Yaime Pérez (CUB)	Sotteville
2020	70.15 m (230 ft 1 in)	Valarie Allman (USA)	Rathdrum
2021	71.16 m (233 ft 5 in)	Valarie Allman (USA)	Berlin
2022	71.46 m (234 ft 5 in)	Valarie Allman (USA)	San Diego
2023	70.47 m (231 ft 2 in)	Valarie Allman (USA)	Berlin
2024	73.09 m (239 ft 9 in)	Yaime Pérez (CUB)	Ramona
2025	73.52 m (241 ft 2 in)	Valarie Allman (USA)	Ramona
2026	73.10 m (239 ft 9 in)	Valarie Sion (USA)	Ramona

== See also ==
- List of discus throw national champions (men)
- United States champions in women's discus throw
