= 1999 World Championships in Athletics – Women's discus throw =

These are the official results of the Women's Discus Throw event at the 1999 World Championships in Seville, Spain. There were a total number of 31 participating athletes, with the final held on Monday 23 August 1999.

== Medalists ==
Gold	Franka Dietzsch; Germany (GER)
Silver	Anastasia Kelesidou; Greece (GRE)
Bronze	Nicoleta Grasu; Romania (ROU)

== Schedule ==
- All times are Central European Time (UTC+1)

Qualification Round
Group A	Group B
21.08.1999 – 19:00h	21.08.1999 – 20:50h
Final Round
23.08.1999 – 19:15h

== Abbreviations ==
- All results shown are in metres

Q	automatic qualification
q	qualification by rank
DNS	did not start
NM	no mark
WR	world record
AR	area record
NR	national record
PB	personal best
SB	season best

== Qualification ==
- Held on Saturday 21 August 1999 with the mark set at 63.50 metres

RANK	GROUP A	DISTANCE
1.	Franka Dietzsch (GER)	66.59 m
2.	Beatrice Faumuina (NZL)	64.18 m
3.	Ellina Zvereva (BLR)	63.37 m
4.	Nicoleta Grasu (ROM)	63.13 m
5.	Ekaterini Voggoli (GRE)	62.39 m
6.	Li Qiumei (CHN)	62.20 m
7.	Lisa-Marie Vizaniari (AUS)	61.49 m
8.	Larisa Korotkevich (RUS)	60.06 m
9.	Anna Söderberg (SWE)	59.65 m
10.	Sabine Sievers (GER)	58.34 m
11.	Teresa Machado (POR)	57.84 m
12.	Cao Qi (CHN)	57.43 m
13.	Marzena Wysocka (POL)	57.43 m
14.	Neelam Jaswant Singh (IND)	57.05 m
15.	Vladímira Malatova-Racková (CZE)	56.64 m
16.	Kris Kuehl (USA)	55.77 m

RANK	GROUP B	DISTANCE
1.	Irina Yatchenko (BLR)	64.58 m
2.	Stella Tsikouna (GRE)	64.16 m
3.	Anastasia Kelesidou (GRE)	64.12 m
4.	Anja Möllenbeck (GER)	63.63 m
5.	Olena Antonova (UKR)	62.87 m
6.	Seilala Sua (USA)	62.48 m
7.	Natalya Sadova (RUS)	62.35 m
8.	Alison Lever (AUS)	60.05 m
9.	Joanna Wiśniewska (POL)	59.83 m
10.	Li Yanfeng (CHN)	59.47 m
11.	Tiina Kankaanpää (FIN)	58.02 m
12.	Aretha Hill (USA)	57.50 m
13.	Oksana Andrusina-Mert (TUR)	57.31 m
14.	Eha Rünne (EST)	56.57 m
—	Elisângela Adriano (BRA)	DNS

== Final ==
RANK	FINAL	DISTANCE
	Franka Dietzsch (GER)	68.14 m
	Anastasia Kelesidou (GRE)	66.05 m
	Nicoleta Grasu (ROM)	65.35 m
4.	Natalya Sadova (RUS)	64.98 m
5.	Beatrice Faumuina (NZL)	64.62 m
6.	Seilala Sua (USA)	63.73 m
7.	Olena Antonova (UKR)	63.61 m
8.	Stella Tsikouna (GRE)	63.43 m
9.	Irina Yatchenko (BLR)	62.99 m
10.	Ellina Zvereva (BLR)	62.75 m
11.	Ekaterini Voggoli (GRE)	61.00 m
12.	Anja Möllenbeck (GER)	59.48 m
