= 2002 European Athletics Championships – Women's discus throw =

Women's discus throw at the European Athletics Championships

The final of the Women's discus throw event at the 2002 European Championships in Munich, Germany was held on August 7, 2002. There were a total number of 18 participating athletes. The qualifying rounds were staged a day earlier, on August 6, with the mark set at 62.00 metres.

== Medalists ==
Gold	Ekaterini Voggoli; Greece (GRE)
Silver	Natalya Sadova; Russia (RUS)
Bronze	Anastasia Kelesidou; Greece (GRE)

== Abbreviations ==
- All results shown are in metres

Q	automatic qualification
q	qualification by rank
DNS	did not start
NM	no mark
WR	world record
AR	area record
NR	national record
PB	personal best
SB	season best

== Records ==
Standing records prior to the 2002 European Athletics Championships
World Record	Gabriele Reinsch (GDR)	76.80 m	July 9, 1988	Neubrandenburg, East Germany
Event Record	Diana Sachse (GDR)	71.36 m	August 28, 1986	Stuttgart, West Germany

== Qualification ==
Rank	Athlete	Attempts			Distance
Rank	Athlete	1	2	3	Distance
1	Ekaterini Voggoli (GRE)				61.94 m
2	Vera Pospíšilová (CZE)				61.93 m
3	Anastasia Kelesidou (GRE)				61.18 m
4	Areti Abatzi (GRE)				61.03 m
5	Joanna Wiśniewska (POL)				60.40 m
6	Teresa Machado (POR)				59.53 m
7	Vladimíra Racková (CZE)				58.92 m
8	Natalya Sadova (RUS)				58.44 m
9	Marzena Wysocka (POL)				58.24 m
10	Jana Tucholke (GER)				56.63 m
11	Shelley Newman (GBR)				56.57 m
12	Mélina Robert-Michon (FRA)				56.56 m
13	Alice Matejková (ESP)	56.18	56.03	53.25	56.18 m
14	Agnese Maffeis (ITA)				55.58 m
15	Anna Söderberg (SWE)				55.55 m
16	Tiina Kankaanpää (FIN)				54.14 m
17	Eha Rünne (EST)				54.01 m
—	Vera Begić (CRO)				NM

== Final ==
Rank	Athlete	Attempts						Distance	Note
Rank	Athlete	1	2	3	4	5	6	Distance	Note
1st place, gold medalist(s)	Ekaterini Voggoli (GRE)	63.09	64.31	63.57	59.13	59.32	59.05	64.31 m	
2nd place, silver medalist(s)	Natalya Sadova (RUS)	61.95	64.07	64.12	63.93	x	x	64.12 m	
3rd place, bronze medalist(s)	Anastasia Kelesidou (GRE)	63.92	62.91	61.58	60.93	59.93	61.21	63.92 m	
4	Vera Pospíšilová (CZE)	60.37	x	60.77	x	62.31	57.70	62.31 m	
5	Marzena Wysocka (POL)	59.82	61.24	x	62.20	59.91	x	62.20 m	
6	Areti Abatzi (GRE)	59.93	x	61.49	x	58.43	x	61.49 m	
7	Teresa Machado (POR)	60.36	x	58.97	60.41	58.64	x	60.41 m	
8	Vladimíra Racková (CZE)	52.92	x	59.28	59.23	x	57.33	59.28 m	
9	Joanna Wiśniewska (POL)	57.29	58.92	57.69				58.92 m	
10	Shelley Newman (GBR)	55.03	57.38	55.69				57.38 m	
11	Jana Tucholke (GER)	56.53	x	55.78				56.53 m	
12	Mélina Robert-Michon (FRA)	54.92	54.07	x				54.92 m	

== See also ==
- 2000 Women's Olympic Discus Throw (Sydney)
- 2001 Women's World Championships Discus Throw (Edmonton)
- 2003 Women's World Championships Discus Throw (Paris)
- 2004 Women's Olympic Discus Throw (Athens)
