= 2005 World Championships in Athletics – Women's discus throw =

The Women's Discus Throw event at the 2005 World Championships in Athletics was held at the Helsinki Olympic Stadium on August 7 and August 11.

== Medalists ==
Gold	Franka Dietzsch; Germany (GER)
Silver	Natalya Sadova; Russia (RUS)
Bronze	Věra Pospíšilová-Cechlová; Czech Republic (CZE)

== Schedule ==
- All times are Eastern European Time (UTC+2)

Qualification Round
Group A	Group B
07.08.2005 – 11:30h	07.08.2005 – 12:40h
Final Round
11.08.2005 – 20:00h

== Abbreviations ==
- All results shown are in metres

Q	automatic qualification
q	qualification by rank
DNS	did not start
NM	no mark
WR	world record
AR	area record
NR	national record
PB	personal best
SB	season best

=== Qualifying ===
==== Group A ====
1. Věra Pospíšilová-Cechlová, Czech Republic 64.26 m Q
2. Aimin Song, China 64.15 m Q
3. Dragana Tomašević, Serbia and Montenegro 62.02 m Q
4. Olena Antonova, Ukraine 61.05 m Q
5. Joanna Wiśniewska, Poland 59.66 m q
6. Elizna Naude, South Africa 58.93 m
7. Oksana Yesipchuk, Russia 58.32 m
8. Marzena Wysocka, Poland 57.44 m
9. Neelam Jaswant Singh, India 56.70 m – disqualified after failing a doping test
10. Tereapii Tapoki, Cook Islands 50.92 m
11. Aretha Thurmond, United States 47.15 m

==== Group B ====
1. Natalya Sadova, Russia 63.65 m Q
2. Franka Dietzsch, Germany 63.53 m Q
3. Nicoleta Grasu, Romania 62.06 m Q
4. Anna Söderberg, Sweden 59.94 m q
5. Beatrice Faumuina, New Zealand 59.81 m q
6. Shuli Ma, China 59.43 m q
7. Natalya Fokina, Ukraine 59.30 m q
8. Yania Ferrales, Cuba 58.38 m
9. Seilala Sua, United States 57.68 m
10. Becky Breisch, United States 57.16 m
11. Wioletta Potępa, Poland 56.31 m

== Final ==
Rank	Athlete	Attempts						Distance	Note
Rank	Athlete	1	2	3	4	5	6	Distance	Note
1st place, gold medalist(s)	Franka Dietzsch (GER)	64.89	64.08	64.36	66.56	65.29	X	66.56 m	SB
2nd place, silver medalist(s)	Natalya Sadova (RUS)	64.33	60.63	61.28	62.31	62.68	61.59	64.33 m	
3rd place, bronze medalist(s)	Vera Pospíšilová-Cechlová (CZE)	60.76	63.00	X	X	63.19	X	63.19 m	
4	Beatrice Faumuina (NZL)	62.73	X	57.70	61.01	60.94	57.42	62.73 m	
5	Nicoleta Grasu (ROM)	55.75	X	62.05	X	X	61.49	62.05 m	
6	Ma Shuli (CHN)	59.21	58.38	61.33	58.15	58.22	59.36	61.33 m	
7	Dragana Tomašević (SCG)	60.56	X	X	X	56.26	56.30	60.56 m	
8	Olena Antonova (UKR)	59.37	59.08	57.71	56.35	X	56.19	59.37 m	
9	Natalya Fokina-Semenova (UKR)	58.44	57.20	55.09				58.44 m	
10	Song Aimin (CHN)	55.98	57.90	X				57.90 m	
11	Anna Söderberg (SWE)	X	57.41	X				57.41 m	
12	Joanna Wisniewska (POL)	57.06	55.64	X				57.06 m	
