= 2003 World Championships in Athletics – Women's discus throw =

These are the official results of the Women's Discus Throw event at the 2003 World Championships in Paris, France. There were a total number of 20 participating athletes, with the final held on Monday 25 August 2003.

== Medalists ==
Gold	Iryna Yatchenko; Belarus (BLR)
Silver	Anastasia Kelesidou; Greece (GRE)
Bronze	Ekaterini Voggoli; Greece (GRE)

== Schedule ==
- All times are Central European Time (UTC+1)

Qualification Round
Group A	Group B
23.08.2003 – 16:10h	23.08.2003 – 17:55h
Final Round
25.08.2003 – 20:35h

== Abbreviations ==
- All results shown are in metres

Q	automatic qualification
q	qualification by rank
DNS	did not start
NM	no mark
WR	world record
AR	area record
NR	national record
PB	personal best
SB	season best

== Qualification ==
RANK	FINAL	GROUP A
1.	Song Aimin (CHN)	62.20 m
2.	Olena Antonova (UKR)	62.14 m
3.	Vera Pospíšilová (CZE)	60.64 m
4.	Mélina Robert-Michon (FRA)	60.47 m
5.	Franka Dietzsch (GER)	59.77 m
6.	Stiliani Tsikouna (GRE)	59.39 m
7.	Kristin Kuehl (USA)	58.07 m
8.	Marzena Wysocka (POL)	57.80 m
9.	Elisângela Adriano (BRA)	57.69 m
10.	Aretha Thurmond (USA)	50.79 m

RANK	FINAL	GROUP B
1.	Natalya Sadova (RUS)	63.47 m
2.	Ekaterini Voggoli (GRE)	63.13 m
3.	Beatrice Faumuina (NZL)	63.12 m
4.	Suzanne Powell (USA)	61.83 m
5.	Iryna Yatchenko (BLR)	61.79 m
6.	Anastasia Kelesidou (GRE)	61.23 m
7.	Neelam Jaswant Singh (IND)	60.33 m
8.	Teresa Machado (POR)	59.87 m
9.	Anna Söderberg (SWE)	59.66 m
10.	Shelley Newman (GBR)	57.65 m

== Final ==
Rank	Athlete	Attempts						Result	Note
Rank	Athlete	1	2	3	4	5	6	Result	Note
1st place, gold medalist(s)	Iryna Yatchenko (BLR)	67.32	62.57	66.12	X	X	X	67.32 m	SB
2nd place, silver medalist(s)	Anastasia Kelesidou (GRE)	65.76	63.93	67.13	65.18	X	67.14	67.14 m	SB
3rd place, bronze medalist(s)	Ekaterini Voggoli (GRE)	X	63.39	66.04	66.73	64.75	65.64	66.73 m	PB
4	Olena Antonova (UKR)	64.51	60.56	X	60.70	65.90	61.72	65.90 m	SB
5	Vera Pospíšilová (CZE)	62.04	61.12	63.23	64.01	65.55	61.96	65.55 m	
6	Natalya Sadova (RUS)	65.22	X	X	63.94	65.07	X	65.22 m	
7	Song Aimin (CHN)	59.71	62.08	63.84	63.20	X	57.53	63.84 m	
8	Anna Söderberg (SWE)	59.81	56.73	61.61	59.32	X	X	61.61 m	SB
9	Suzanne Powell (USA)	58.38	59.86	X				59.86 m	
10	Teresa Machado (POR)	X	57.86	59.46				59.46 m	
11	Mélina Robert-Michon (FRA)	58.52	52.99	54.84				58.52 m	
12	Neelam Jaswant Singh (IND)	X	54.42	57.92				57.92 m	
13	Beatrice Faumuina (NZL)	54.68	X	56.86				56.86 m	
