= Athletics at the 2000 Summer Olympics – Women's discus throw =

Women's discus throw at the Games of the XXVII Olympiad
- Venue: Stadium Australia
- Dates: 25 September 2000 (qualification); 27 September 2000 (final)
- Competitors: 32 from 20 nations
- Winning distance: 68.40

Medalists
1st place, gold medalist(s)		Ellina Zvereva; Belarus
2nd place, silver medalist(s)		Anastasia Kelesidou; Greece
3rd place, bronze medalist(s)		Iryna Yatchenko; Belarus

The Women's Discus Throw event at the 2000 Summer Olympics as part of the athletics program was held at the Olympic Stadium on Monday, 25 September and Wednesday, 27 September.

The qualifying athletes progressed through to the final where the qualifying distances are scrapped and they start afresh with up to six throws. The qualifying distance was set at 63.00 metres. For all qualifiers who did not achieve the standard, the remaining spaces in the final were filled by the longest throws until a total of 12 qualifiers.

== Medalists ==
Gold	Ellina Zvereva; Belarus
Silver	Anastasia Kelesidou; Greece
Bronze	Irina Yatchenko; Belarus

== Schedule ==
- All times are Australian Eastern Standard Time (UTC+10)

Qualification Round
Group A	Group B
25.09.2000 – 10:00h	25.09.2000 – 11:40h
Final Round
27.09.2000 – 20:30h

== Abbreviations ==
Q	automatic qualification
q	qualification by rank
DNS	did not start
NM	no mark
OR	olympic record
WR	world record
AR	area record
NR	national record
PB	personal best
SB	season best

== Records ==
Standing records prior to the 2000 Summer Olympics
World Record	Gabriele Reinsch (GDR)	76.80 m	9 July 1988	Neubrandenburg, East Germany
Olympic Record	Martina Hellmann (GDR)	72.30 m	29 September 1988	Seoul, South Korea

== Qualification ==
=== Group A ===
Rank	Overall	Athlete	Country	Attempts			Distance	Note
Rank	Overall	Athlete	Country	1	2	3	Distance	Note
1	1	Ellina Zvereva	Belarus	61.26	64.81	—	64.81 m	
2	4	Ilke Wyludda	Germany	62.97	X	60.83	62.97 m	
3	7	Seilala Sua	United States	56.19	61.88	59.06	61.88 m	
4	8	Stiliani Tsikouna	Greece	59.58	61.59	56.33	61.59 m	
5	11	Yu Xin	China	59.79	61.00	60.12	61.00 m	
6	13	Olena Antonova	Ukraine	60.73	60.28	59.85	60.73 m	
7	14	Vladimíra Racková	Czech Republic	X	60.24	55.32	60.24 m	
8	17	Oksana Yesipchuk	Russia	59.51	57.14	58.64	59.51 m	
9	19	Nicoleta Grasu	Romania	X	X	58.87	58.87 m	
10	20	Larisa Korotkevich	Russia	58.81	56.90	X	58.81 m	
11	21	Qi Cao	China	57.88	57.01	58.03	58.03 m	
12	23	Monia Kari	Tunisia	56.32	52.61	54.01	56.32 m	
13	29	Mélina Robert-Michon	France	X	54.11	X	54.11 m	
14	30	Renata Gustaitytė	Lithuania	X	53.64	X	53.64 m	
15	31	Daniela Costian	Australia	X	51.96	X	51.96 m	
16	32	Mariana Canillas	Paraguay	X	32.31	X	32.31 m	

=== Group B ===
Rank	Overall	Athlete	Country	Attempts			Distance	Note
Rank	Overall	Athlete	Country	1	2	3	Distance	Note
1	2	Natalya Sadova	Russia	64.62	—	—	64.62 m	
2	3	Anastasia Kelesidou	Greece	63.64	—	—	63.64 m	
3	5	Irina Yatchenko	Belarus	62.72	58.94	60.89	62.72 m	
4	6	Lisa-Marie Vizaniari	Australia	60.39	59.39	62.47	62.47 m	
5	9	Beatrice Faumuina	New Zealand	61.33	57.88	58.55	61.33 m	
6	10	Aikaterini Vongoli	Greece	61.29	X	X	61.29 m	
7	12	Franka Dietzsch	Germany	59.78	60.74	59.29	60.74 m	
8	15	Suzy Powell-Roos	United States	X	X	59.68	59.68 m	
9	16	Alison Lever	Australia	X	54.45	59.58	59.58 m	
10	18	Kris Kuehl	United States	59.45	54.02	57.54	59.45 m	
11	22	Li Qiumei	China	56.28	56.59	55.01	56.59 m	
12	24	Anna Söderberg	Sweden	54.94	55.89	56.11	56.11 m	
13	25	Teresa Machado	Portugal	X	X	55.86	55.86 m	
14	26	Neelam Jaswant Singh	India	55.22	55.26	X	55.26 m	
15	27	Oksana Mert	Turkey	54.18	54.74	55.02	55.02 m	
16	28	Alice Matejková	Spain	54.19	53.12	X	54.19 m	

== Final ==
Rank	Athlete	Attempts						Distance	Extra
Rank	Athlete	1	2	3	4	5	6	Distance	Extra
1st place, gold medalist(s)	Ellina Zvereva (BLR)	67.00	66.12	68.40	65.80	X	X	68.40 m	SB
2nd place, silver medalist(s)	Anastasia Kelesidou (GRE)	65.71	63.20	62.59	64.58	63.07	61.85	65.71 m	
3rd place, bronze medalist(s)	Irina Yatchenko (BLR)	X	62.93	61.09	63.15	65.20	X	65.20 m	
4	Natalya Sadova (RUS)	65.00	61.64	61.92	62.86	X	60.47	65.00 m	
5	Styliani Tsikouna (GRE)	61.85	60.66	X	X	59.91	64.08	64.08 m	
6	Franka Dietzsch (GER)	X	61.65	58.17	60.36	63.18	X	63.18 m	
7	Ilke Wyludda (GER)	63.16	61.91	62.22	59.86	61.72	62.33	63.16 m	
8	Lisa-Marie Vizaniari (AUS)	60.78	62.43	62.57	X	62.24	X	62.57 m	
9	Ekaterini Voggoli (GRE)	60.72	61.57	60.45				61.57 m	
10	Seilala Sua (USA)	58.03	56.24	59.85				59.85 m	
11	Teresa Machado (POR)	54.48	59.50	56.84				59.50 m	
12	Beatrice Faumuina (NZL)	56.86	X	58.69				58.69 m	
13	Yu Xin (CHN)	57.95	58.34	57.89				58.34 m	
