= 1997 World Championships in Athletics – Women's discus throw =

These are the official results of the Women's Discus Throw event at the 1997 IAAF World Championships in Athens, Greece. There were a total number of 29 participating athletes, with two qualifying groups and the final held on Thursday August 7, 1997. The qualifying round was held on Tuesday August 5, 1997, with the mark set at 62.00 metres.

== Medalists ==
Gold	Beatrice Faumuina; New Zealand (NZL)
Silver	Ellina Zvereva; Belarus (BLR)
Bronze	Natalya Sadova; Russia (RUS)

== Schedule ==
- All times are Eastern European Time (UTC+2)

Qualification Round
Group A	Group B
05.08.1997 – 08:10h	05.08.1997 – 09:50h
Final Round
07.08.1997 – 18:10h

== Abbreviations ==
- All results shown are in metres

Q	automatic qualification
q	qualification by rank
DNS	did not start
NM	no mark
WR	world record
AR	area record
NR	national record
PB	personal best
SB	season best

== Qualification ==
=== Group A ===
Rank	Overall	Athlete	Attempts			Result	Note
Rank	Overall	Athlete	1	2	3	Result	Note
1	3	Irina Yatchenko (BLR)	65.00	—	—	65.00 m	
2	4	Beatrice Faumuina (NZL)	X	X	64.58	64.58 m	
3	5	Stella Tsikouna (GRE)	58.62	58.90	61.52	61.52 m	
4	8	Nicoleta Grasu (ROM)	60.16	X	60.44	60.44 m	
5	9	Larisa Korotkevich (RUS)	60.30	X	59.68	60.30 m	
6	10	Lisa-Marie Vizaniari (AUS)	60.28	59.20	57.86	60.28 m	
7	11	Agnese Maffeis (ITA)	59.94	58.96	55.44	59.94 m	
8	14	Liu Fengying (CHN)	X	56.12	59.50	59.50 m	
9	17	Alice Matejková (CZE)	X	58.96	55.70	58.96 m	
10	21	Suzy Powell-Roos (USA)	54.22	52.70	52.62	54.22 m	
11	22	Shelley Drew (GBR)	53.96	52.14	X	53.96 m	
12	23	Tsvetanka Khristova (BUL)	X	53.64	49.56	53.64 m	
13	24	Areti Abatzi (GRE)	X	49.72	X	49.72 m	
14	25	Hüsniye Keskin (TUR)	46.80	48.80	X	48.80 m	

=== Group B ===
Rank	Overall	Athlete	Attempts			Result	Note
Rank	Overall	Athlete	1	2	3	Result	Note
1	1	Ellina Zvereva (BLR)	X	61.76	65.94	65.94 m	SB
2	2	Natalya Sadova (RUS)	65.14	—	—	65.14 m	
3	6	Teresa Machado (POR)	57.40	X	61.36	61.36 m	
4	7	Luan Zhili (CHN)	57.74	61.18	X	61.18 m	
5	12	Anna Söderberg (SWE)	59.64	X	59.88	59.88 m	
6	13	Olena Antonova (UKR)	59.62	59.10	56.70	59.62 m	
7	15	Anastasia Kelesidou (GRE)	56.48	59.22	58.30	59.22 m	
8	16	Edie Boyer (USA)	59.18	X	X	59.18 m	
9	18	Elisângela Adriano (BRA)	47.00	57.88	54.66	57.88 m	
10	19	Xiao Yanling (CHN)	X	56.32	X	56.32 m	
11	20	Lacy Barnes-Mileham (USA)	53.22	55.52	X	55.52 m	
12	26	Siniva Marsters (COK)	X	X	35.22	35.22 m	
—	—	Franka Dietzsch (GER)	X	X	X	NM	
—	—	Isabelle Devaluez (FRA)	X	X	X	NM	
—	—	Mette Bergmann (NOR)	X	X	X	NM	

== Final ==
Rank	Athlete	Attempts						Distance	Note
Rank	Athlete	1	2	3	4	5	6	Distance	Note
1st place, gold medalist(s)	Beatrice Faumuina (NZL)	X	X	66.82	62.60	X	X	66.82 m	
2nd place, silver medalist(s)	Ellina Zvereva (BLR)	63.40	65.90	61.86	64.98	64.64	65.72	65.90 m	
3rd place, bronze medalist(s)	Natalya Sadova (RUS)	63.70	65.14	X	63.08	X	X	65.14 m	
4	Larisa Korotkevich (RUS)	62.76	62.44	60.96	X	63.02	62.04	63.02 m	
5	Irina Yatchenko (BLR)	X	62.02	61.40	62.58	60.70	57.94	62.58 m	
6	Teresa Machado (POR)	62.00	60.78	X	X	59.92	X	62.00 m	
7	Stiliani Tsikouna (GRE)	61.92	57.70	X	58.00	59.66	58.12	61.92 m	
8	Agnese Maffeis (ITA)	61.40	54.98	57.48	54.36	54.28	X	61.40 m	
9	Luan Zhili (CHN)	60.62	57.42	57.76				60.62 m	
10	Nicoleta Grasu (ROM)	58.06	58.88	60.14				60.14 m	
11	Anna Söderberg (SWE)	58.22	X	X				58.22 m	
12	Lisa-Marie Vizaniari (AUS)	55.20	57.56	X				57.56 m	

== See also ==
- 1996 Women's Olympic Discus Throw
