= 2001 World Championships in Athletics – Women's discus throw =

These are the official results of the Women's Discus Throw event at the 2001 World Championships in Edmonton, Alberta, Canada. There were a total number of 22 participating athletes, with the final held on Saturday 11 August 2001. The qualification mark was set at 63.00 metres.

Ellina Zvereva won the gold medal at 40 years and 269 days old. She is, as of 2017, the oldest World Champion ever.

== Medalists ==
Gold	Ellina Zvereva; Belarus (BLR)
Silver	Nicoleta Grasu; Romania (ROU)
Bronze	Anastasia Kelesidou; Greece (GRE)

== Schedule ==
- All times are Mountain Standard Time (UTC-7)

Qualification Round
Group A	Group B
09.08.2001 – 18:20h	09.08.2001 – 20:15h
Final Round
11.08.2001 – 16:00h

== Abbreviations ==
- All results shown are in metres

Q	automatic qualification
q	qualification by rank
DNS	did not start
NM	no mark
WR	world record
AR	area record
NR	national record
PB	personal best
SB	season best

== Records ==
Standing records prior to the 2001 World Athletics Championships
World Record	Gabriele Reinsch (GDR)	76.80 m	July 9, 1988	Neubrandenburg, East Germany
Event Record	Martina Hellmann (GDR)	71.62 m	August 31, 1987	Rome, Italy
Season Best	Nicoleta Grasu (ROU)	68.31 m	June 11, 2001	Athens, Greece

== Startlist ==
Order	№	Athlete	Season Best	Personal Best
GROUP A
1	850	Seilala Sua (USA)	65.64	65.90
2	122	Tina McDonald (CAN)	59.76	59.76
3	25	Alison Lever (AUS)	63.25	63.73
4	189	Věra Pospíšilová-Cechlová (CZE)	63.20	63.20
5	74	Irina Yatchenko (BLR)	66.65	68.94
6	324	Franka Dietzsch (GER)	65.87	69.51
7	615	Joanna Wiśniewska (POL)	63.75	63.97
8	840	Suzy Powell-Roos (USA)	64.50	65.30
9	706	Natalya Sadova (RUS)	67.18	70.02
10	366	Anastasia Kelesidou (GRE)	65.52	67.70
11	137	Li Qiumei (CHN)	60.99	67.50
GROUP B
1	624	Teresa Machado (POR)	63.01	65.40
3	642	Nicoleta Grasu (ROM)	68.31	68.80
3	372	Stiliani Tsikouna (GRE)	61.09	65.13
4	281	Mélina Robert-Michon (FRA)	63.87	63.87
5	790	Olena Antonova (UKR)	64.20	66.67
6	404	Neelam Jaswant Singh (IND)	59.14	63.02
7	190	Vladimíra Racková (CZE)	65.50	65.50
8	374	Ekaterini Voggoli (GRE)	63.47	64.82
9	347	Anja Möllenbeck (GER)	63.42	64.63
10	832	Kris Kuehl (USA)	65.28	65.34
11	75	Ellina Zvereva (BLR)	62.92	71.58

== Qualification ==
=== Group A ===
Rank	Overall	Athlete	Attempts			Distance	Note
Rank	Overall	Athlete	1	2	3	Distance	Note
1	2	Natalya Sadova (RUS)	61.85	64.43	—	64.43 m	
2	4	Franka Dietzsch (GER)	59.75	58.71	63.15	63.15 m	
3	6	Seilala Sua (USA)	62.54	56.16	55.23	62.54 m	
4	8	Věra Pospíšilová-Cechlová (CZE)	62.27	58.43	X	62.27 m	
5	9	Anastasia Kelesidou (GRE)	62.12	62.26	61.47	62.26 m	
6	10	Li Qiumei (CHN)	61.90	60.24	X	61.90 m	SB
7	12	Irina Yatchenko (BLR)	60.67	58.31	56.39	60.67 m	
8	17	Joanna Wiśniewska (POL)	58.53	58.05	X	58.53 m	
9	18	Suzy Powell-Roos (USA)	57.81	57.49	58.19	58.19 m	
10	21	Alison Lever (AUS)	54.31	53.54	X	54.31 m	
11	22	Tina McDonald (CAN)	46.98	X	X	46.98 m	

=== Group B ===
Rank	Overall	Athlete	Attempts			Distance	Note
Rank	Overall	Athlete	1	2	3	Distance	Note
1	1	Ellina Zvereva (BLR)	65.78	—	—	65.78 m	
2	3	Nicoleta Grasu (ROM)	59.05	63.37	—	63.37 m	
3	5	Kris Kuehl (USA)	59.82	60.90	62.63	62.63 m	
4	7	Vladimíra Racková (CZE)	61.29	62.32	59.33	62.32 m	
5	11	Anja Möllenbeck (GER)	60.86	57.32	57.71	60.86 m	
6	13	Stiliani Tsikouna (GRE)	58.53	60.32	56.13	60.32 m	
7	14	Ekaterini Voggoli (GRE)	59.98	X	59.58	59.98 m	
8	15	Teresa Machado (POR)	59.74	57.62	X	59.74 m	
9	16	Olena Antonova (UKR)	58.55	X	X	58.55 m	
10	19	Neelam Jaswant Singh (IND)	56.33	56.52	55.46	56.52 m	
11	20	Mélina Robert-Michon (FRA)	55.25	56.22	X	56.22 m	

== Final ==
Rank	Athlete	Attempts						Result	Note
Rank	Athlete	1	2	3	4	5	6	Result	Note
1st place, gold medalist(s)	Ellina Zvereva (BLR)	X	67.10	X	64.70	65.37	X	67.10 m	
2nd place, silver medalist(s)	Nicoleta Grasu (ROM)	55.70	65.34	63.74	X	66.24	65.73	66.24 m	
3rd place, bronze medalist(s)	Anastasia Kelesidou (GRE)	61.02	65.50	62.70	63.47	62.37	65.14	65.50 m	
4	Franka Dietzsch (GER)	63.62	X	63.12	X	64.60	65.38	65.38 m	
5	Seilala Sua (USA)	63.74	X	X	X	X	X	63.74 m	
6	Věra Pospíšilová-Cechlová (CZE)	60.72	59.46	X	60.60	61.47	X	61.47 m	
7	Kris Kuehl (USA)	56.91	61.04	X	59.81	X	59.79	61.04 m	
8	Anja Möllenbeck (GER)	60.49	X	X				60.49 m	
9	Irina Yatchenko (BLR)	57.64	57.12	59.45				59.45 m	
10	Li Qiumei (CHN)	57.81	X	57.02				57.81 m	
11	Vladimíra Racková (CZE)	X	56.43	X				56.43 m	
—	Natalya Sadova (RUS)	65.24	66.87	66.36	68.57	67.80	67.18	DSQ	
