= Athletics at the 2004 Summer Olympics – Women's discus throw =

Coordinates: 38°2′10.1″N 23°47′15.1″E

Women's discus throw at the Games of the XXVIII Olympiad
- Olympic Athletics
- Venue: Olympic Stadium
- Dates: 20–21 August
- Competitors: 42 from 27 nations
- Winning distance: 67.02

Medalists
1st place, gold medalist(s)		Natalya Sadova; Russia
2nd place, silver medalist(s)		Anastasia Kelesidou; Greece
3rd place, bronze medalist(s)		Věra Pospíšilová-Cechlová; Czech Republic

The women's discus throw competition at the 2004 Summer Olympics in Athens was held at the Olympic Stadium on 20–21 August. It was originally planned to hold the discus throw at the Ancient Olympia Stadium, but it was discovered that the field was not large enough to accommodate the range of modern discus throwers, and would have posed a danger to spectators. As such, it was decided to move the discus throw and to hold the shot put at the ancient stadium, despite the fact that the shot put was not contested at the Ancient Olympic Games.

On December 5, 2012, Belarusian discus thrower Iryna Yatchenko was stripped of her bronze medal after drug re-testings of her samples on methandienone had been discovered positive. Following the announcement of Yatchenko's disqualification, the International Olympic Committee Executive Board had distributed and awarded the bronze to Czech Republic's Věra Pospíšilová-Cechlová, who originally finished fourth in the final.

== Competition format ==
Each athlete receives three throws in the qualifying round. All who achieve the qualifying distance progress to the final. If less than twelve athletes achieve this mark, then the twelve furthest throwing athletes reach the final. Each finalist is allowed three throws in last round, with the top eight athletes after that point being given three further attempts.

== Schedule ==
All times are Greece Standard Time (UTC+2)

Date	Time	Round
Friday, 20 August 2004	21:30	Qualification
Saturday, 21 August 2004	21:10	Final

== Records ==
Prior to the competition, the existing World and Olympic records were as follows:

World record	Gabriele Reinsch (GDR)	76.80 m	Neubrandenburg, East Germany	9 July 1988
Olympic record	Martina Hellmann (GDR)	72.30 m	Seoul, South Korea	29 September 1988

No new records were set during the competition.

== Results ==
=== Qualifying round ===
Rule: Qualifying standard 62.50 (Q) or at least best 12 qualified (q).

Rank	Group	Name	Nationality	#1	#2	#3	Result	Notes
1	A	Věra Pospíšilová-Cechlová	Czech Republic	64.48	—	—	64.48	Q
2	A	Natalya Sadova	Russia	64.33	—	—	64.33	Q
3	B	Olena Antonova	Ukraine	62.15	64.20	—	64.20	Q
4	B	Anastasia Kelesidou	Greece	64.13	—	—	64.13	Q
5	A	Beatrice Faumuina	New Zealand	64.07	—	—	64.07	Q
6	A	Ekaterini Voggoli	Greece	63.39	—	—	63.39	Q
7	B	Iryna Yatchenko	Belarus	62.15	63.04	—	63.04	Q
8	A	Nicoleta Grasu	Romania	59.87	60.89	61.91	61.91	q
9	B	Styliani Tsikouna	Greece	61.72	60.17	60.67	61.72	q
10	B	Yania Ferrales	Cuba	x	56.46	61.54	61.54	q
11	A	Joanna Wiśniewska	Poland	61.48	56.11	58.43	61.48	q
12	B	Li Yanfeng	China	61.19	61.35	61.24	61.35	q
13	A	Harwant Kaur	India	60.82	59.20	59.95	60.82	
14	B	Seema Antil	India	59.93	60.64	58.41	60.64	
15	A	Ellina Zvereva	Belarus	60.35	x	60.63	60.63	
16	B	Wioletta Potępa	Poland	60.50	x	57.99	60.50	
17	B	Neelam Jaswant Singh	India	60.26	57.25	60.10	60.26	
18	A	Philippa Roles	Great Britain	57.30	58.83	x	58.83	
19	B	Aretha Hill	United States	52.93	58.82	x	58.82	
20	B	Elizna Naudé	South Africa	58.74	58.26	58.32	58.74	
21	A	Olga Chernyavskaya	Russia	58.64	58.19	58.55	58.64	
22	A	Stephanie Brown	United States	x	58.54	x	58.54	
23	B	Teresa Machado	Portugal	58.47	57.00	57.65	58.47	
24	A	Natalya Fokina	Ukraine	58.28	56.84	55.64	58.28	
25	B	Song Aimin	China	58.19	58.03	x	58.19	
26	A	Elisângela Adriano	Brazil	x	58.13	x	58.13	
27	A	Franka Dietzsch	Germany	x	57.57	58.12	58.12	
28	B	Dace Ruskule	Latvia	54.49	57.43	x	57.43	
29	A	Vera Begić	Croatia	x	54.80	57.31	57.31	
30	B	Oksana Yesipchuk	Russia	x	57.27	57.18	57.27	
31	A	Mélina Robert-Michon	France	56.70	x	56.53	56.70	
32	A	Huang Qun	China	56.53	x	55.06	56.53	
33	B	Shelley Newman	Great Britain	x	54.04	56.04	56.04	
34	B	Vladimíra Racková	Czech Republic	55.82	x	55.36	55.82	
35	A	Anna Söderberg	Sweden	54.04	55.49	51.24	55.49	
36	B	Alice Matejková	Spain	54.15	x	55.37	55.37	
37	B	Eha Rünne	Estonia	54.28	x	54.82	54.82	
38	B	Dragana Tomašević	Serbia and Montenegro	51.71	x	54.44	54.44	
39	A	Éva Kürti	Hungary	52.52	50.85	x	52.52	
40	A	Tereapii Tapoki	Cook Islands	47.59	48.12	x	48.12	
41	A	Tsvetanka Khristova	Bulgaria	43.25	x	x	43.25	
	B	Seilala Sua	United States	x	x	x	NM	

=== Final ===
Rank	Name	Nationality	1	2	3	4	5	6	Result	Notes
1st place, gold medalist(s)	Natalya Sadova	Russia	64.78	64.81	x	65.33	67.02	66.68	67.02	
2nd place, silver medalist(s)	Anastasia Kelesidou	Greece	62.77	x	66.68	63.71	66.09	61.59	66.68	
3rd place, bronze medalist(s)	Věra Pospíšilová-Cechlová	Czech Republic	63.02	66.08	x	62.81	63.21	64.84	66.08	
4	Olena Antonova	Ukraine	59.88	64.11	x	63.61	60.37	65.75	65.75	
5	Nicoleta Grasu	Romania	62.01	62.21	63.48	61.58	61.93	64.92	64.92	SB
6	Beatrice Faumuina	New Zealand	x	62.45	x	63.45	62.99	x	63.45	
7	Ekaterini Voggoli	Greece	60.66	61.44	x	62.37	62.32	61.84	62.37	
8	Li Yanfeng	China	60.67	57.36	61.05				61.05	
9	Joanna Wiśniewska	Poland	58.33	60.74	59.95				60.74	
10	Styliani Tsikouna	Greece	59.48	57.76	x				59.48	
	Yania Ferrales	Cuba	x	x	x				NM	
	Iryna Yatchenko	Belarus	~~59.98~~	~~61.67~~	~~66.17~~	~~65.46~~	~~63.08~~	~~65.54~~	~~66.17~~	DSQ
