= Huang Qun =

Huang Qun may refer to:

- Huang Qun (discus thrower), Chinese discus thrower
- Huang Qun (gymnast), Chinese gymnast
