= Athletics at the 1999 Summer Universiade – Women's discus throw =

The women's discus throw event at the 1999 Summer Universiade was held at the Estadio Son Moix in Palma de Mallorca, Spain on 11 and 12 July.

== Medalists ==
Gold	Silver	Bronze
Nicoleta Grasu; Romania	Joanna Wiśniewska; Poland	Styliani Tsikouna; Greece

== Results ==
=== Qualification ===
Qualification: 57.00 (Q) or at least 12 best performers (q) advance to the final

Rank	Group	Athlete	Nationality	#1	#2	#3	Result	Notes
1	A	Anna Söderberg	Sweden				62.98	Q, SB
2	A	Nicoleta Grasu	Romania				62.41	Q
3	B	Joanna Wiśniewska	Poland				60.33	Q
4	A	Styliani Tsikouna	Greece				59.52	Q
DQ	B	Elisângela Adriano	Brazil				~~58.86~~	Q, Doping
5	A	Aretha Hill	United States				58.72	Q
6	B	Viktoriya Boyko	Ukraine				58.14	Q
7	B	Shelley Drew	Great Britain				57.36	Q
8	A	Tao Hongbo	China				57.32	Q
9	B	Suzy Powell	United States				56.95	q
10	B	Mélina Robert-Michon	France				56.26	q
11	A	Marzena Zbrojewska	Poland				56.15	q
12	B	Lacramioara Ionescu	Romania				55.40	
13	A	Elizna Naudé	South Africa				55.15	
14	A	Philippa Roles	Great Britain				54.82	
15	A	Ilona Rutjes	Netherlands				54.79	PB
16	A	Liudmila Starovoytova	Belarus				53.67	
17	B	Carmen Solé	Spain	48.57	50.23	49.20	50.23	
18	B	Grete Etholm	Norway				50.16	
19	B	Helena Engman	Sweden				46.60	
20	A	Elin Isane	Norway				45.19	
21	B	Karella Aguarto	Peru				40.85	
	B	Zamiwe Hara	Malawi				NM	
	A	Sarah Walter	France				DNS	

=== Final ===
Rank	Athlete	Nationality	#1	#2	#3	#4	#5	#6	Result	Notes
1st place, gold medalist(s)	Nicoleta Grasu	Romania	x	59.46	65.07	64.59	x	65.21	65.21	
2nd place, silver medalist(s)	Joanna Wiśniewska	Poland	59.56	61.15	60.76	x	x	63.97	63.97	
DQ	Elisângela Adriano	Brazil							~~62.23~~	Doping
3rd place, bronze medalist(s)	Styliani Tsikouna	Greece							61.59	
4	Anna Söderberg	Sweden							60.14	
5	Aretha Hill	United States							58.95	
6	Suzy Powell	United States							58.83	
7	Mélina Robert-Michon	France							56.81	
8	Tao Hongbo	China							56.74	
9	Viktoriya Boyko	Ukraine							56.40	
10	Shelley Drew	Great Britain							55.04	
11	Marzena Zbrojewska	Poland							54.28	
