= Iryna Yatchenko =

Belarusian discus thrower

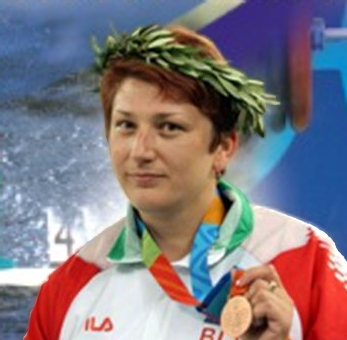
- Iryna Yatchenko on a 2004 Belarusian stamp. She was later found to have been doping and lost the medal.

Personal information
- Native name: Ірына Ятчанка
- Nationality: Belarusian
- Born: Iryna Vasiliyevna Yatchenko; 31 October 1965 (age 60) Homel, Byelorussian SSR, Soviet Union
- Years active: 1990–2010
- Height: 1.86 m (6 ft 1 in)
- Weight: 105 kg (231 lb)

Sport
- Country: Soviet Union (1990–1991); Unified Team (1992); Belarus (1993–2009)
- Sport: Discus throw
- Club: Trud Grodno; RTsFVS Homel
- Turned pro: 1990
- Retired: 2010

Achievements and titles
- Personal best: 69.14 m (2004)
Medal record
Women's Athletics
Representing Belarus
Olympic Games
Bronze medal – third place	2000 Sydney	Discus
Disqualified	2004 Athens	Discus
World Championships
Gold medal – first place	2003 Paris	Discus

Iryna Vasiliyevna Yatchenko (Belarusian: Ірына Ятчанка, Russian: Ирина Васильевна Ятченко; born 31 October 1965) is a Belarusian former discus thrower best known for winning two Olympic bronze medals at the 2000 Summer Olympics and 2004 Summer Olympics, although she was eventually stripped of the latter medal due to a doping offence. She also became world champion at the 2003 World Championships in Athletics. Her personal best is 69.14 metres, achieved in July 2004 in Minsk.

== Career ==
Yatchenko was born in Gomel. Her career at the highest level of competition lasted almost twenty years, starting with the 1990 European Athletics Championships. She threw the discus at five editions of the Olympic Games, competing at all Games from the 1992 Barcelona Games to the 2008 Beijing Olympics. Yatchenko's World Championship career was similarly extensive, as she competed on eight separate occasions.

Yatchenko's final major competition was the 2009 World Championships in Athletics, but she failed to register a valid throw in the qualifying rounds. She retired from international competition in June 2010 and the Belarus National Olympic Committee held a ceremony to honour her career. At the age of 44, she was one of the last athletes to retire who had previously represented the Soviet Union in international athletics.

Yatchenko is married to Igor Astapkovich, also a Belarusian Olympic medalist in hammer throw.

=== Doping case ===
When the IOC in 2012 re-analysed stored samples from the 2004 Summer Olympics, Yatchenko's sample was found positive for the anabolic steroid Methandienone. IOC subsequently disqualified her results from the Athens Olympics and she was made to return the bronze medal and diploma. The IAAF also banned her for two years from sports and disqualified all her results from 21 August 2004 – 20 August 2006.

== Achievements ==
Year	Competition	Venue	Position	Notes
Representing Soviet Union
1990	Goodwill Games	Seattle, United States	2nd	67.04 m
1990	European Championships	Split, Yugoslavia	5th	65.16 m
1991	World Championships	Tokyo, Japan	7th	64.92 m
Representing Unified Team
1992	Olympic Games	Barcelona, Spain	7th	63.74 m
1992	IAAF Grand Prix Final	Turin, Italy	3rd	Second on season's points
Representing Belarus
1995	World Championships	Gothenburg, Sweden	9th	60.48 m
1996	Olympic Games	Atlanta, United States	12th	60.46 m
1997	World Championships	Athens, Greece	5th	62.58 m
1998	European Championships	Budapest, Hungary	8th	61.20 m
1999	World Championships	Seville, Spain	9th	62.99 m
2000	Olympic Games	Sydney, Australia	3rd	65.20 m
2001	World Championships	Edmonton, Canada	9th	59.45 m
2003	World Championships	Paris, France	1st	67.32 m
2003	World Athletics Final	Monte Carlo, Monaco	8th	
2004	Olympic Games	Athens, Greece	DSQ (3rd)	66.17 m
2004	World Athletics Final	Monte Carlo, Monaco	DSQ (3rd)	
2006	European Championships	Gothenburg, Sweden	10th	59.65 m
2007	World Championships	Paris, France	10th	62.63 m
2008	Olympic Games	Beijing, China	11th	59.27 m
2009	World Championships	Berlin, Germany	NM	No mark

Sporting positions
Preceded by (Russia) Natalya Sadova	Women's Discus Best Year Performance; 2004	Succeeded by (Czech Republic) Vera Pospíšilová
Preceded by (Germany) Franka Dietzsch	Women's Discus Best Year Performance; 2008	Succeeded by (China) Li Yanfeng
