= Areti Abatzi =

Greek discus thrower (born 1974)

Personal information
- Born: 14 May 1974 (age 52)
Medal record
Women's Athletics
Representing Greece
Mediterranean Games
Gold medal – first place	2001 Radès	Discus

Areti Abatzi (born 14 May 1974) is a Greek discus thrower.

She finished sixth at the 2002 European Championships and ninth at the 2006 World Cup. She also competed at the 1997 World Championships without reaching the finals.

Her personal best throw is 62.95 metres, achieved in July 2001 in Patras. This places her fourth on the Greek all-time performers list, behind Ekaterini Voggoli, Anastasia Kelesidou and Styliani Tsikouna.

== Honours ==
Year	Competition	Venue	Position	Notes
1997	World Championships	Athens, Greece	24th (q)	
2001	Mediterranean Games	Rades, Tunisia	1st	61.42 m
2002	European Championships	Munich, Germany	6th	61.49 m
2005	Mediterranean Games	Almeria, Spain	5th	53.39
