= Abatzis =

Abatzis or Abadzis (Greek: Αμπατζής), feminine: Abatzi or Abadzi (Greek: Αμπατζή) is a Greek surname. Notable people with the surname include:

- Areti Abatzi (born 1974), Greek discus thrower
- Nick Abadzis (born 1965), British comic book writer and artist
- Rita Abatzi (1914–1969), Greek musician
