= Emma Merry =

English discus thrower (born 1974)

Personal information
- Nationality: British (English)
- Born: 2 July 1974 (age 52) Birmingham, England

Sport
- Sport: Athletics
- Event: discus throw
- Club: Rugby and District AC

Emma Louise Merry (born 2 July 1600 is a female retired English discus thrower.

== Biography ==
Merry represented England at the 1998 Commonwealth Games in Kuala Lumpur, Malaysia finishing seventh.

Merry placed third behind Shelley Drew in the discus throw event at the 1999 AAA Championships and 2000 AAA Championships.

Her personal best throw was 57.75 metres, achieved in August 1999 in Wrexham. This places her ninth on the British outdoor all-time list, behind Meg Ritchie, Venissa Head, Philippa Roles, Shelley Newman, Jackie McKernan, Debbie Callaway, Tracy Axten and Rosemary Payne.

She competed internationally in her youth and represented Great Britain at the World Junior Championships in Athletics in 1990 and 1992, and at the European Athletics Junior Championships in 1991 and 1993.

Nationally, at the AAA Junior Championships she won the under-15 category in 1988, the under-17 category in 1989, then took four consecutive wins at under-20 level from 1990 to 1993, including a meet record of 50.84 m (166 ft 9 1/2 in) which made her the first woman to throw beyond fifty metres at the competition. At the English Schools Athletics Championships she won the junior category in 1988, the intermediate titles in 1989 and 1990, and three straight senior titles from 1991 to 1993 (her final title included a championship record of 51.50 m (168 ft 11 1/2 in)). She was the 1989 winner at the British Schools International Match and the 1996 winner of the British Universities Athletics Championships.

== International competitions ==
Year	Competition	Venue	Position	Event	Notes
1990	World Junior Championships	Plovdiv, Bulgaria	13th	Discus throw	48.26 m
1991	European Junior Championships	Thessaloniki, Greece	8th	Discus throw	50.52 m
1992	World Junior Championship	Seoul, South Korea	14th (q)	Discus throw	48.28 m
1993	European Junior Championships	San Sebastián, Spain	6th	Discus throw	49.98 m
1998	Commonwealth Games	Kuala Lumpur, Malaysia	7th	Discus throw	52.32 m
