= Joanna Wiśniewska =

Polish discus thrower

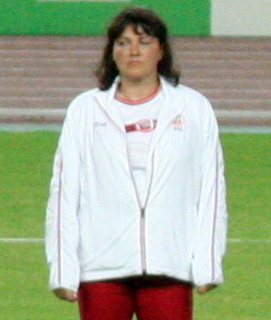
- Joanna Wiśniewska at the 2007 World Championships

Personal information
- Born: 24 May 1972 (age 54) Wrocław, Poland
- Height: 1.78 m (5 ft 10 in)
- Weight: 100 kg (220 lb)

Sport
- Sport: Athletics
- Event: Discus throw
- Club: Warszawianka; Gwardia Warszawa; LKS Polkowice
Medal record
European Championships
Bronze medal – third place	2010 Barcelona	Discus throw
Summer Universiade
Silver medal – second place	1999 Palma de Mallorca	Discus throw

Joanna Wiśniewska (born 24 May 1972) is a discus thrower from Poland. Her personal best throw is 63.97 metres, achieved at the 1999 Summer Universiade in Palma. She competed at the 2004 and 2008 Summer Olympics as well as five World Championships.

== Competition record ==
Year	Competition	Venue	Position	Notes
Representing Poland
1990	World Junior Championships	Plovdiv, Bulgaria	22nd (q)	45.02 m
1991	European Junior Championships	Thessaloniki, Greece	9th	48.50 m
1999	Universiade	Palma, Spain	2nd	63.97 m (=PB)
1999	World Championships	Seville, Spain	17th (q)	59.83 m
2001	World Championships	Edmonton, Canada	17th (q)	58.53 m
2002	European Championships	Munich, Germany	9th	58.92 m
2004	Olympic Games	Athens, Greece	10th	60.74 m
2005	World Championships	Helsinki, Finland	12th	57.06 m
2006	European Championships	Gothenburg, Sweden	12th	59.41 m
2007	World Championships	Osaka, Japan	6th	61.35 m
2008	Olympic Games	Beijing, China	18th (q)	59.40 m
2009	World Championships	Berlin, Germany	21st (q)	58.85 m
2010	European Championships	Barcelona, Spain	3rd	62.37 m
2012	European Championships	Helsinki, Finland	10th	57.72 m
