= Li Qiumei =

Chinese discus thrower (born 1974)

Medal record

Women's athletics

Representing China

Asian Championships
Gold medal – first place	1995 Jakarta	Discus throw

Li Qiumei (Chinese: 黎秋梅; pinyin: Lí Qiūméi; born September 26, 1974) is a retired female Chinese discus thrower.

Her personal best throw was 67.50 metres, achieved in May 1994 in Beijing. The Chinese and Asian record is currently held by Xiao Yanling with 71.68 metres.

== Achievements ==
Year	Competition	Venue	Position	Notes
Representing China
1995	Asian Championships	Jakarta, Indonesia	1st	58.26 m
1995	World Championships	Gothenburg, Sweden	16th (q)	58.88 m
1999	World Championships	Seville, Spain	13th (q)	62.20 m
2000	Olympic Games	Sydney, Australia	22nd (q)	56.59 m
2001	East Asian Games	Osaka, Japan	1st	60.99 m
2001	World Championships	Edmonton, Canada	10th	57.81 m
2001	Universiade	Beijing, China	1st	61.66 m
