= Renata Gustaitytė =

Lithuanian discus thrower (born 1974)

Personal information
- Nationality: Lithuanian
- Born: 7 April 1974 (age 52)

Sport
- Sport: Athletics
- Event: Discus throw

Renata Gustaitytė (born 7 April 1974) is a Lithuanian athlete. She competed in the women's discus throw at the 2000 Summer Olympics.
