= Beatrice Faumuina =

New Zealand discus thrower

Beatrice Faumuina CNZM
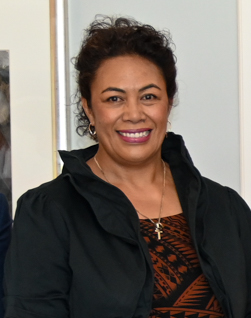
- Faumuina in 2026

Personal information
- Full name: Beatrice Roini Liua Faumuina
- Born: 23 October 1974 (age 52) Auckland, New Zealand
- Height: 1.80 m (5 ft 11 in)
- Weight: 116 kg (256 lb)

Sport
- Country: New Zealand
- Sport: Athletics
- Event: Discus
- Coached by: Les Mills
Medal record
Women's athletics
Representing New Zealand
World Championships
Gold medal – first place	1997 Athens	Discus
Commonwealth Games
Gold medal – first place	1998 Kuala Lumpur	Discus
Gold medal – first place	2002 Manchester	Discus
Silver medal – second place	1994 Victoria	Discus
IAAF World Cup
Gold medal – first place	2002 Madrid	Discus
Oceania Championships
Gold medal – first place	2010 Cairns	Discus
- Updated on 14 August 2012

Beatrice Roini Liua Faumuina CNZM (born 23 October 1974 in Auckland, New Zealand) is a former New Zealand discus thrower.

== Career ==
Faumuina was a gold medallist at the 1997 World Championships in Athletics. She has represented New Zealand in four Summer Olympics. After winning the discus event at the 2002 Commonwealth Games in Manchester she was featured on a stamp from Samoa. She is currently New Zealand's Trade Commissioner and Consul General, New York.

At the 2004 Summer Olympics she placed 7th in the discus with a throw of 64.45 metres. Early in her career, she was coached by Les Mills, discus gold medallist at the 1966 Commonwealth Games.

In the 2005 Queen's Birthday Honours, Faumuina was appointed an Officer of the New Zealand Order of Merit, for services to athletics. On 16 October 2005, she was nominated Goodwill Ambassador of the Food and Agriculture Organization of the United Nations (FAO).

In 2006, she appeared in the New Zealand version of the television series Dancing with the Stars where she was placed second. Since 2006 she has been a presenter on the Television New Zealand Pacific Islands current events programme Tagata Pasifika. She also attended Lynfield College.

Injured during much of 2006, Faumuina finished fourth at the Melbourne Commonwealth Games. In 2007 she based herself in Australia for the majority of 2007. She threw 62.20 metres at a meet in Christchurch, beating rival Dani Samuels from Australia. This followed a winning throw of 62.08 throw at a meet in Canberra.

She placed 28th in the 2008 Summer Olympics in Beijing with a throw of 57.18m, failing to qualify for the final. Her comments to media following her elimination were widely criticised after it was perceived that she was satisfied with what many viewed as a sub-standard performance.

Faumuina finished seventh in the 2009 Reebok Grand Prix in New York, with a throw of 56.73 metres. She was expected to compete in the Prefontaine Classic meet in Oregon, in order to throw the qualifying standard for the 2009 World Championships in Athletics in Berlin. However, she did not attend the meeting and her coach stated that she had decided to focus on her upcoming Bachelor of Business Studies exams instead.

Faumuina has retired from discus throwing.

Faumuina (right), after her investiture as a Companion of the New Zealand Order of Merit by the governor-general, Dame Cindy Kiro, at Government House, Auckland, on 1 October 2026

In the 2026 King's Birthday Honours, Faumuina was promoted to Companion of the New Zealand Order of Merit, for services to sport and governance.

== Achievements ==
Year	Competition	Venue	Position	Event	Notes
Representing New Zealand
1992	World Junior Championships	Seoul, South Korea	14th (q)	Shot put	14.58 m
1992	World Junior Championships	Seoul, South Korea	5th	Discus throw	52.20 m
1994	Commonwealth Games	Victoria, Canada	9th	Shot put	14.80 m
1994	Commonwealth Games	Victoria, Canada	2nd	Discus throw	57.12 m
1995	World Championships	Gothenburg, Sweden	28th (q)	Discus throw	54.32 m
1996	Olympic Games	Atlanta, United States	23rd (q)	Discus throw	58.40 m
1997	World Championships	Athens, Greece	1st	Discus throw	66.82 m
1998	Commonwealth Games	Kuala Lumpur, Malaysia	4th	Shot put	16.41 m
1998	Commonwealth Games	Kuala Lumpur, Malaysia	1st	Discus throw	65.92 m CR
1999	World Championships	Seville, Spain	5th	Discus throw	64.62 m
2000	Olympic Games	Sydney, Australia	12th	Discus throw	58.69 m
2002	Commonwealth Games	Manchester, United Kingdom	1st	Discus throw	60.83 m
2002	World Cup	Madrid, Spain	1st	Discus throw	60.83 m
2003	World Championships	Paris, France	13th	Discus throw	56.86 m
2004	Olympic Games	Athens, Greece	6th	Discus throw	63.45 m
2005	World Championships	Helsinki, Finland	4th	Discus throw	62.73 m
2006	Commonwealth Games	Melbourne, Australia	4th	Discus throw	59.12 m
2007	World Championships	Osaka, Japan	25th (q)	Discus throw	55.75 m
2008	Olympic Games	Beijing, China	28th (q)	Discus throw	57.15 m
2010	Oceania Championships	Cairns, Australia	1st	Discus throw	58.32 m CR
2010	Commonwealth Games	Delhi, India	5th	Discus throw	57.79 m

Awards and achievements
Preceded by Danyon Loader	Lonsdale Cup of the New Zealand Olympic Committee; 1997	Succeeded by Rob Waddell
Preceded by Shane Cortese & Nerida Lister	Dancing with the Stars (New Zealand) runner up Season 2 (2006 with Brian Jones)	Succeeded by Megan Alatini & Jonny Williams
