= Oksana Esipchuk =

Russian discus thrower

Oksana Aleksandrovna Esipchuk (Russian: Оксана Александровна Есипчук; born 13 December 1976 in Bryansk) is a female discus thrower from Russia. Her personal best throw is 63.68 metres, achieved in June 2000 in Tula.

She finished ninth at the 2001 Summer Universiade. In addition she competed at the Olympic Games in 2000 and 2004 as well as the 2005 World Championships without qualifying for the final round.

== International competitions ==
Representing Russia
Year	Competition	Venue	Position	Event	Result	Notes
2000	Olympic Games	Sydney, Australia	17th	Discus throw	59.51 m	
2004	Olympic Games	Athens, Greece	30th	Discus throw	57.27 m	
