= Kris Kuehl =

American discus thrower (born 1970)

Personal information
- Born: July 30, 1970 (age 55) Windom, Minnesota, United States

Sport
- Sport: Track and field
Medal record
Representing United States
Pan American Games
| Silver medal – second place | 1999 Winnipeg | Shot put |
| Bronze medal – third place | 1995 Mar del Plata | Shot put |

Kristin "Kris" Kuehl (born July 30, 1970) is a retired track and field athlete from the United States, who competed in the discus throw event. Kuehl attended Division III Concordia College in Moorhead, Minnesota. Kuehl was the 2002 USA champion, and won the silver medal at the 1999 Pan American Games in Winnipeg, Manitoba, Canada, after gaining the bronze four years earlier in Mar del Plata. Her personal best throw is 65.34 metres (214.37 feet), achieved in April 2000 in St Paul.

== International competitions ==
| Year | Competition | Venue | Position | Notes |
Representing the United States
| 1993 | Universiade | Buffalo, United States | 14th (q) | 51.90 m |
| 1993 | World Championships | Stuttgart, Germany | 24th (q) | 56.66 m |
| 1995 | Pan American Games | Mar del Plata, Argentina | 3rd | 56.92 m |
| 1998 | Goodwill Games | Uniondale, United States | 3rd | 61.84 m |
| 1998 | World Cup | Johannesburg, South Africa | 6th | 59.88 m |
| 1999 | Pan American Games | Winnipeg, Canada | 2nd | 57.21 m |
| 1999 | World Championships | Seville, Spain | 30th (q) | 55.77 m |
| 2000 | Olympic Games | Sydney, Australia | 18th (q) | 59.45 m |
| 2001 | World Championships | Edmonton, Canada | 7th | 61.04 m |
| 2002 | World Cup | Madrid, Spain | 5th | 59.57 m |
| 2003 | World Championships | Paris, France | 16th (q) | 58.07 m |
