= Marzena Wysocka =

Polish discus thrower

Marzena Wysocka (born 17 February 1969) is a Polish female discus thrower. Her personal best throw is 64.57 metres, achieved in June 2005 in Warsaw.

She finished fifth at the 2002 European Championships and eighth at the 2005 World Athletics Final. She competed at the World Championships in 1999, 2003 and 2005 without reaching the finals.

== Achievements ==
Year	Competition	Venue	Position	Notes
Representing Poland
1999	World Championships	Seville, Spain	25th (q)	57.43 m
2002	European Championships	Munich, Germany	5th	62.20 m
2003	World Championships	Paris, France	16th (q)	57.80 m
2005	World Championships	Helsinki, Finland	17th (q)	57.80 m
2005	DécaNation	Paris, France	1st	60.74 m
