= Suzy Powell-Roos =

American discus thrower (born 1976)

Personal information
- Full name: Suzanne Powell-Roos
- Born: September 3, 1976 (age 50) Modesto, California, U.S.
- Height: 6 ft 0 in (183 cm)
- Weight: 174 lb (79 kg)

Sport
- Sport: Athletics
- Events: Discus throw, javelin throw
- Club: Asics

Achievements and titles
- Personal bests: DT – 69.44 m (2002); JT – 54.62 m (1997)

Suzanne "Suzy" Powell-Roos (born September 3, 1976) is an American discus thrower. She competed at the 1996, 2000 and 2008 Olympics with the best result of 15th place in 2000.

She holds the American record at 222 ft 0 in (67.67 m), which she set on March 14, 2007 in Wailuku, Maui, Hawaii at the "Big Wind" Discus Challenge. She set the world's best year performance in 2002, with a throw of 69.44 meters at the University of California, San Diego on April 27, 2002, the best throw in the world since 1999. That throw was not ratified as the American record due to technical issues with the throwing sector.

While in high school at Thomas Downey High School in 1994 she was named the national Girl's "High School Athlete of the Year" by Track and Field News after setting the National High School Record in the discus at 214' 0" As a sophomore, she was on the American team at the IAAF World Junior Championships, finishing tenth. Two years later she took home a bronze medal from the same event. She was the 1995 Pan American Junior Championships gold medalist. She later attended UCLA. She won the 1996 and 2007 USA Outdoor Track and Field Championships (1996 while winning the United States Olympic Trials (track and field). She was the runner up six times.

== Achievements ==
| Year | Competition | Venue | Position | Notes |
Representing the United States
| 1992 | World Junior Championships | Seoul, South Korea | 10th | 46.84 m |
| 1994 | World Junior Championships | Lisbon, Portugal | 3rd | 52.62 m |
| 1996 | Olympic Games | Atlanta, United States | 33rd (q) | 56.24 m |
| 1997 | World Championships | Athens, Greece | 21st (q) | 54.22 m |
| 1999 | Universiade | Palma de Mallorca, Spain | 7th | 58.83 m |
| 2000 | Olympic Games | Sydney, Australia | 15th (q) | 59.68 m |
| 2001 | World Championships | Edmonton, Canada | 18th (q) | 58.19 m |
| 2003 | Pan American Games | Santo Domingo, Dominican Republic | 4th | 60.00 m |
| 2003 | World Championships | Paris, France | 9th | 59.86 m |
| 2007 | World Championships | Osaka, Japan | 15th (q) | 59.57 m |
| 2008 | Olympic Games | Beijing, China | 26th (q) | 58.02 m |

Achievements
| Preceded by Natalya Sadova | Women's Discus Best Year Performance; 2002 | Succeeded by Natalya Sadova |
