= Eha Rünne =

Estonian shot putter and discus thrower

Eha Rünne (born 25 May 1963 in Tallinn) is a female shot putter and discus thrower from Estonia, who competed in the discus contest at the 1996 Summer Olympics in Atlanta, Georgia. There she ended up in 26th place (58.24 metres).

Rünne set her personal best in the women's discus throw event (63.18 metres) on 13 July 1988 in Pärnu. She also competed for her native country at the 2004 Summer Olympics, finishing in 37th place in the discus event.

== Achievements ==
Year	Competition	Venue	Position	Event	Result
Representing Estonia
1994	European Championships	Helsinki, Finland	16th (q)	Shot put	16.21 m
1994	European Championships	Helsinki, Finland	15th (q)	Discus	56.50 m
1996	Olympic Games	Atlanta, United States	26th	Discus	58.24 m
1999	World Championships	Seville, Spain	29th	Discus	56.57 m
2002	European Championships	Munich, Germany	17th	Discus	54.01 m
2004	Olympic Games	Athens, Greece	37th	Discus	54.82 m
