= Athletics at the 2002 Asian Games – Women's discus throw =

Women's discus throw at the 2002 Asian Games
- Venue: Busan Asiad Main Stadium
- Date: 10 October 2002
- Competitors: 6 from 4 nations

Medalists
gold medal	Neelam Jaswant Singh	India
silver medal	Song Aimin	China
bronze medal	Ma Shuli	China

The women's discus throw competition at the 2002 Asian Games in Busan, South Korea was held on 10 October at the Busan Asiad Main Stadium.

== Schedule ==
All times are Korea Standard Time (UTC+09:00)

Date	Time	Event
Thursday, 10 October 2002	13:00	Final

== Records ==
Prior to this competition, the existing world, Asian and Games records were as follows.

World Record	Gabriele Reinsch (GDR)	76.80	Neubrandenburg, East Germany	9 July 1988
Asian Record	Xiao Yanling (CHN)	71.68	Beijing, China	14 March 1992
Games Record	Hou Xuemei (CHN)	63.56	Beijing, China	3 October 1990

== Results ==
Rank	Athlete	Attempt						Result	Notes
Rank	Athlete	1	2	3	4	5	6	Result	Notes
1st place, gold medalist(s)	Neelam Jaswant Singh (IND)	59.18	64.55	X	58.15	59.23	57.47	64.55	GR
2nd place, silver medalist(s)	Song Aimin (CHN)	58.03	61.38	58.68	60.20	X	61.80	61.80	
3rd place, bronze medalist(s)	Ma Shuli (CHN)	57.40	59.02	59.89	56.16	54.98	55.02	59.89	
4	Harwant Kaur (IND)	57.13	X	56.76	55.48	56.90	58.31	58.31	
5	Yuka Murofushi (JPN)	45.30	47.10	X	49.67	51.68	49.02	51.68	
6	Won Soon-mi (KOR)	42.34	45.01	X	46.62	48.58	48.84	48.84	
