= Mélina Robert-Michon =

French discus thrower

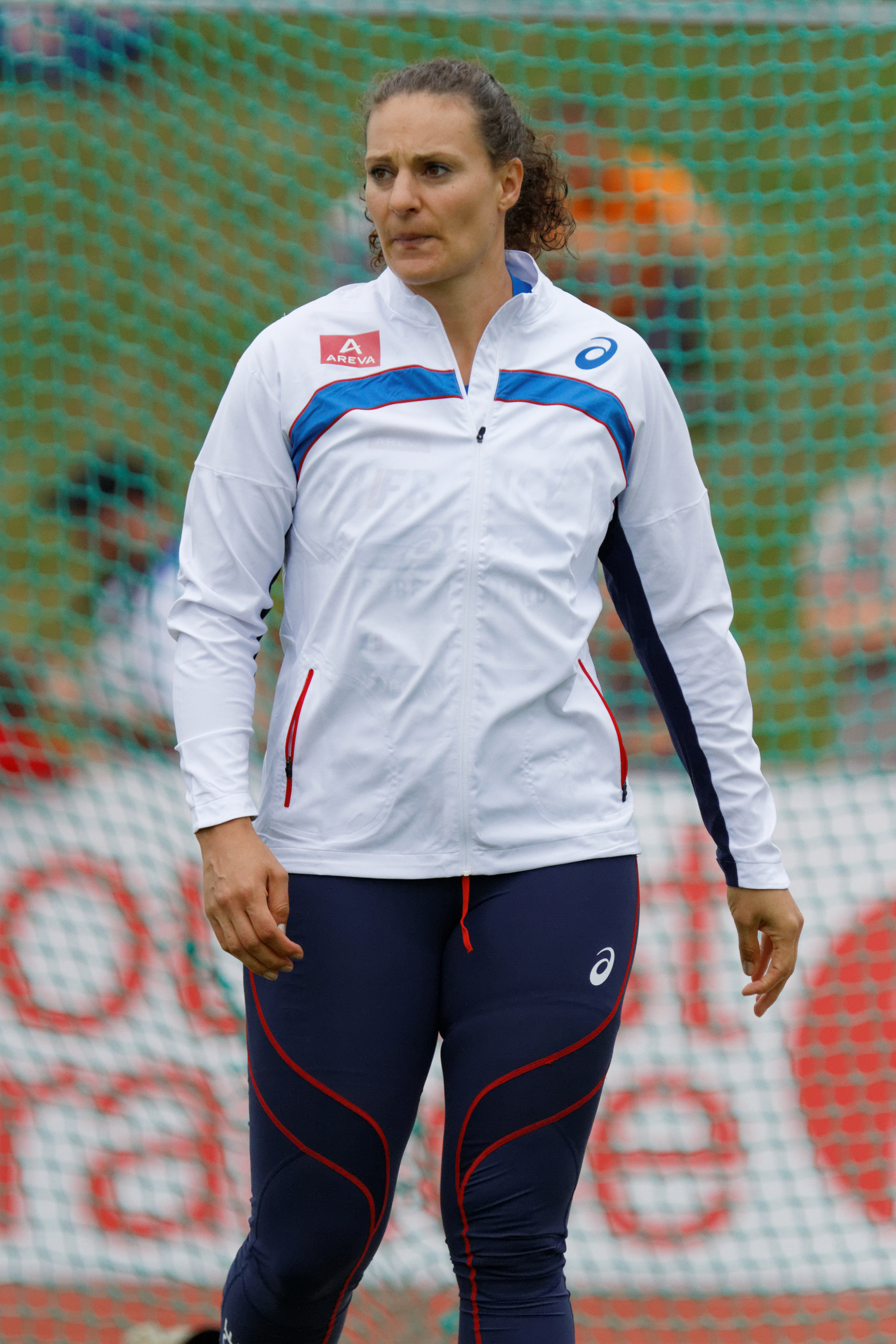
- Mélina Robert-Michon at the DécaNation 2014

Personal information
- Born: 18 July 1979 (age 47) Voiron, France
- Height: 1.80 m (5 ft 11 in)
- Weight: 83 kg (183 lb)

Sport
- Country: France
- Sport: Athletics
- Event: Discus throw

Achievements and titles
- Personal bests: 66.73 metres (2016) NR
Medal record
Representing France
Olympic Games
Silver medal – second place	2016 Rio de Janeiro	Discus throw
World Championships
Silver medal – second place	2013 Moscow	Discus throw
Bronze medal – third place	2017 London	Discus throw
European Championships
Silver medal – second place	2014 Zurich	Discus throw
European Games
Bronze medal – third place	2023 Kraków-Małopolska	Discus throw
Universiade
Bronze medal – third place	2001 Beijing	Discus throw
Jeux de la Francophonie
Bronze medal – third place	2001 Ottawa	Discus throw
Mediterranean Games
Gold medal – first place	2009 Pescara	Discus Throw
European Cup Winter Throwing
Gold medal – first place	2014 Leiria	Discus throw
Gold medal – first place	2016 Arad	Discus throw
Gold medal – first place	2017 Las Palmas	Discus throw
Silver medal – second place	2007 Yalta	Discus throw
Silver medal – second place	2008 Split	Discus throw
Silver medal – second place	2013 Castellón	Discus throw
Silver medal – second place	2015 Leiria	Discus throw
Bronze medal – third place	2001 Nice	Discus throw
Bronze medal – third place	2004 Marsa	Discus throw
Bronze medal – third place	2012 Bar	Discus throw
World Junior Championships
Silver medal – second place	1998 Annecy	Discus throw
European Athletics U23 Championships
Gold medal – first place	2001 Amsterdam	Discus throw

Mélina Robert-Michon (French pronunciation: [melina ʁɔbɛʁ miʃɔ̃]; born 18 July 1979) is a French discus thrower. She was the silver medalist at the 2013 World Championships and 2016 Summer Olympics and the national record holder. She earned the bronze medal at the 2017 World Championships and was the flag bearer of her country with the olympic swimmer Florent Manaudou during the 2024 Summer Olympics opening ceremonies.

== Discus career ==
At the 2013 World Championships in Moscow, Robert-Michon won the discus silver medal with her last throw – a distance of 66.28 metres – which broke her own national record (65.78 m) set 11 years prior on 17 July 2002. Her 66.28 metres was much better than her hitherto, 2013 best distance of 63.75m. She had never finished better than eighth place in the final in her four previous World Championships appearances. She became the first male or female French athlete to win a World Championships medal in the discus event. Right after securing the silver medal, she told a television interviewer, "I had been working hard a long time for this. Since the start of the season, I said that I wanted to climb onto the podium. Many people laughed at it and did not quite believe it. I have been waiting so long for this.”

In December 2013, Robert-Michon was chosen as the 2013 French female athlete of the year, according to an Internet poll taken from the athletics fraternity, in which more than 2500 votes were cast over two weeks. The poll was conducted by the Fédération française d'athlétisme.

On 25 June 2016, Robert-Michon won her 16th French National Discus Championship, by throwing 63.40 m, less than 1 metre more than the runner-up Pauline Pousse (62.68 m). She finished fifth at the 2016 European Championships in Amsterdam with a throw of 62.47m in the final, after having thrown 63.99m in the qualifying round (which would have been good enough for the bronze medal).

Robert-Michon's achieved her best result in her fifth Olympic appearance at the 2016 Olympics in Rio de Janeiro. 16 years after her first Olympic appearance at the 2000 Olympics in Sydney, she won the silver medal at the age of 37; her throw of 66.73m in the final beat her own French national record and was 2.48 m less than the distance registered by the Croatian winner Sandra Perković. Robert-Michon finished in 2nd place at both the 2016 Meeting de Paris (27 August, 64.36 m) and the 2016 Weltklasse Zurich (1 September, 63.91 m), behind the winner Sandra Perković in both competitions.

In December 2016, she was chosen for the second in her career as the 2016 French female athlete of the year, ahead of trail-runner Caroline Cheverot and 800 m European silver medalist Rénelle Lamote.

After a difficult season struggled by minor injuries, the French managed to win the bronze medal at the World Championships in London behind Croatia's Sandra Perković and Australia's Dani Stevens, both former world champions. Her result of 66.21m is her best throw of the season, and the third best of his career (behind 66.73m in 2016 and 66.28m in 2013).

In January 2018, she retained her « French female athlete of the year award » for the second consecutive year, this time for 2017, well ahead of world trail-runner champion Adeline Roche and 400 m runner Floria Gueï. She is the first athlete to win three times the award.

== Family ==
Robert-Michon has a daughter named Elyssa, born on 24 August 2010. On 5 December 2017, she announced her second pregnancy.

== Results in international competitions ==
Note: Only the position and distance in the final are indicated, unless otherwise stated. (q) means the athlete did not qualify for the final, with the overall position and distance in the qualification round indicated.

Year	Competition	Venue	Position	Notes
Representing France
1998	World Junior Championships	Annecy, France	2nd	55.01 m
1998	European Championships	Budapest, Hungary	29th (q)	47.88 m
1999	Universiade	Palma de Mallorca, Spain	8th	56.81 m
1999	European U23 Championships	Gothenburg, Sweden	12th	50.75 m
2000	Olympic Games	Sydney, Australia	29th (q)	54.11 m
2001	European U23 Championships	Amsterdam, Netherlands	1st	58.52 m
2001	Jeux de la Francophonie	Ottawa, Canada	3rd	56.81 m
2001	World Championships	Edmonton, Canada	20th (q)	56.22 m
2001	Universiade	Beijing, China	3rd	58.04 m
2002	European Championships	Munich, Germany	12th	54.92 m
2003	World Championships	Paris, France	11th	58.52 m
2003	European Cup	Florence, Italy	2nd	61.67 m
2004	Olympic Games	Athens, Greece	31st (q)	56.70 m
2005	Mediterranean Games	Almería, Spain	6th	51.80 m
2006	European Championships	Gothenburg, Sweden	17th (q)	53.77 m
2007	World Championships	Osaka, Japan	11th	57.81 m
2008	European Cup Winter Throwing	Split, Croatia	2nd	59.93 m
2008	Olympic Games	Beijing, China	8th	60.66 m
2009	Mediterranean Games	Pescara, Italy	1st	61.17 m
2009	European Team Championships	Leiria, Portugal	2nd	61.41 m
2009	World Athletics Final	Thessaloniki, Greece	3rd	61.74 m
2009	World Championships	Berlin, Germany	8th	60.92 m
2012	European Cup Winter Throwing	Bar, Montenegro	3rd	63.03 m
2012	European Championships	Helsinki, Finland	6th	60.41 m
2012	Olympic Games	London, United Kingdom	5th	63.98 m
2013	European Team Championships	Gateshead, United Kingdom	1st	63.75 m
2013	European Cup Winter Throwing	Castellón de la Plana, Spain	2nd	61.26 m
2013	World Championships	Moscow, Russia	2nd	66.28 m NR
2014	European Championships	Zurich, Switzerland	2nd	65.33 m
2015	World Championships	Beijing, China	10th	60.92 m
2016	Olympic Games	Rio de Janeiro, Brazil	2nd	66.73 m NR
2017	World Championships	London, United Kingdom	3rd	66.21 m
2017	DécaNation	Angers, France	1st	60.06 m
2019	World Championships	Doha, Qatar	10th	59.99 m
2021	Olympic Games	Tokyo, Japan	15th (q)	60.88 m
2022	World Championships	Eugene, United States	10th	60.36 m
2022	European Championships	Munich, Germany	8th	60.60 m
2023	World Championships	Budapest, Hungary	9th	63.46 m
2024	European Championships	Rome, Italy	7th	61.65 m
2024	Olympic Games	Paris, France	12th	57.03 m
2025	World Championships	Tokyo, Japan	15th (q)	61.24 m
2026	European Championships	Birmingham, United Kingdom	9th	60.58 m

Olympic Games
Preceded by Clarisse Agbegnenou; Samir Aït Saïd	Flagbearer for France (with Florent Manaudou); Paris 2024	Succeeded by Incumbent
