= 2007 World Championships in Athletics – Women's discus throw =

The women's discus throw event at the 2007 World Championships in Athletics took place on August 27, 2007 (qualification) and August 29, 2007 (final) at the Nagai Stadium in Osaka, Japan.

== Medallists ==
Gold	Franka Dietzsch; Germany (GER)
Silver	Yarelis Barrios; Cuba (CUB)
Bronze	Nicoleta Grasu; Romania (ROM)

== Abbreviations ==
- All results shown are in metres

Q	automatic qualification
q	qualification by rank
DNS	did not start
NM	no mark
WR	world record
AR	area record
NR	national record
PB	personal best
SB	season best

== Records ==
World Record	Gabriele Reinsch (GDR)	76.80	Neubrandenburg, East Germany	8 July 1986
Championship Record	Martina Hellmann (GDR)	71.62	Rome, Italy	31 August 1987

== Qualification ==
=== Group A ===
Place	Athlete	Nation	1	2	3	Mark	Notes pie
1	Franka Dietzsch	Germany	65.17			65.17	Q
2	Nicoleta Grasu	Romania	X	64.26		64.26	Q
3	Yarelis Barrios	Cuba	63.44			63.44	Q PB
4	Iryna Yatchenko	Belarus	63.44			63.44	Q
5	Ma Xuejun	China	51.67	59.62	60.89	60.89	q
6	Dani Samuels	Australia	54.47	60.44	57.97	60.44	
7	Song Aimin	China	60.10	X	57.98	60.10	
8	Kateryna Karsak	Ukraine	59.46	X	X	59.46	
9	Wioletta Potepa	Poland	X	59.20	X	59.20	
10	Anna Söderberg	Sweden	56.56	57.96	58.65	58.65	
11	Becky Breisch	United States	X	54.55	58.42	58.42	
12	Dragana Tomašević	Serbia	57.85	56.96	57.96	57.96	
13	Cecilia Barnes	United States	53.02	X	X	53.02	
14	Tereapii Tapoki	Cook Islands	50.35	48.37	48.32	50.35	

=== Group B ===
Place	Athlete	Nation	1	2	3	Mark	Notes
1	Joanna Wisniewska	Poland	63.13			63.13	Q SB
2	Sun Taifeng	China	61.99			61.99	Q
3	Darya Pishchalnikova	Russia	58.76	61.88		61.88	Q
4	Mélina Robert-Michon	France	59.79	57.95	61.66	61.66	Q
5	Yania Ferrales	Cuba	59.96	X	61.48	61.48	q
6	Natalya Fokina-Semenova	Ukraine	61.33	X	59.15	61.33	q
7	Olena Antonova	Ukraine	59.04	60.90	X	60.90	q
8	Suzy Powell-Roos	United States	59.57	59.08	58.23	59.57	
9	Věra Pospíšilová-Cechlová	Czech Republic	57.56	56.97	X	57.56	
10	Elisângela Adriano	Brazil	56.50	55.15	57.21	57.21	
11	Krishna Poonia	India	50.52	54.38	57.17	57.17	
12	Nadine Müller	Germany	55.98	55.09	X	55.98	
13	Beatrice Faumuina	New Zealand	X	55.75	X	55.75	
14	Yuka Murofushi	Japan	50.76	51.79	52.76	52.76	

== Final ==
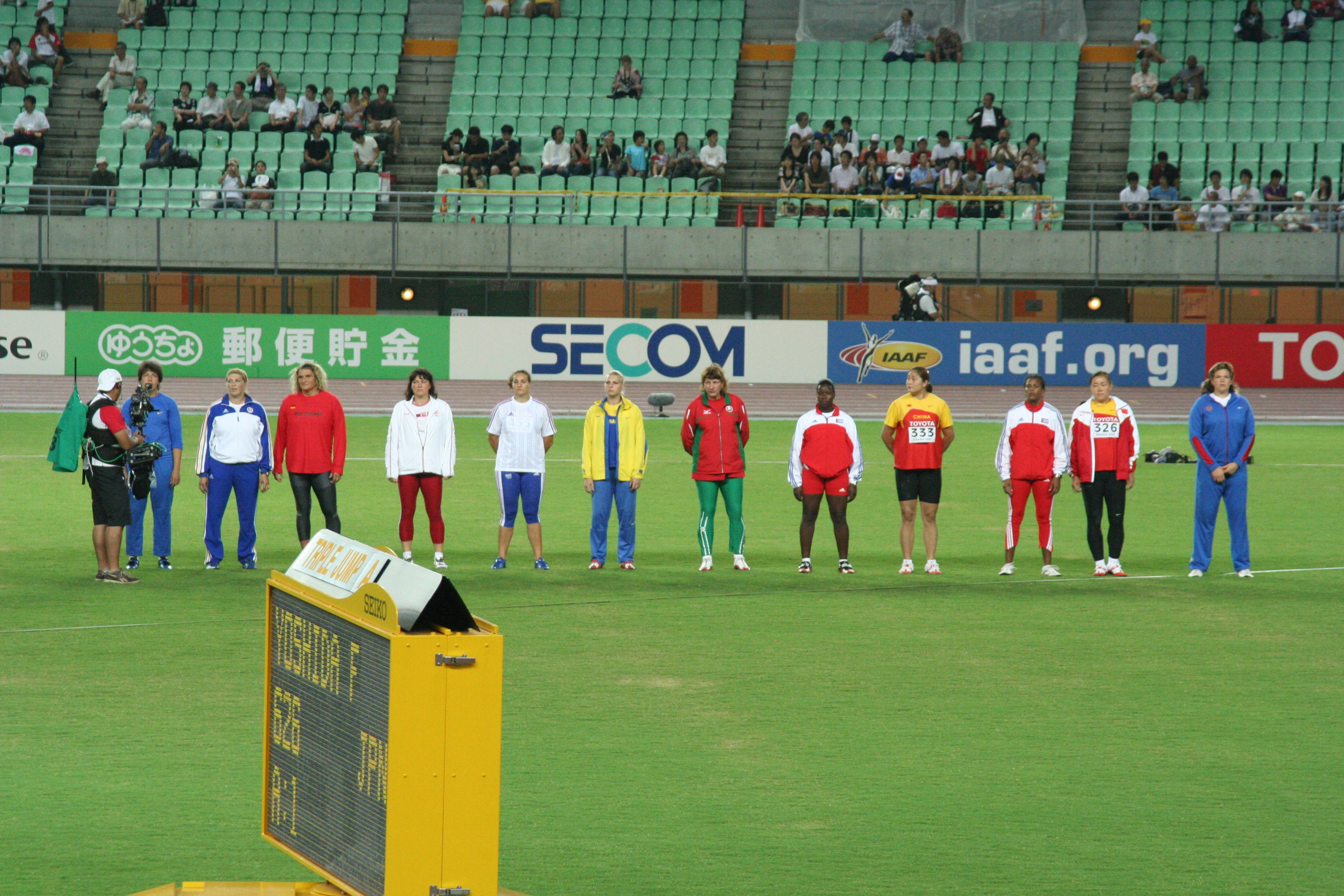
The finalists

Place	Athlete	Nation	Mark	Notes
1st place, gold medalist(s)	Franka Dietzsch	Germany	66.61	
2nd place, silver medalist(s)	Yarelis Barrios	Cuba	63.90	PB
3rd place, bronze medalist(s)	Nicoleta Grasu	Romania	63.40	
4	Sun Taifeng	China	63.22	
5	Olena Antonova	Ukraine	62.41	SB
6	Joanna Wisniewska	Poland	61.35	
7	Natalya Fokina-Semenova	Ukraine	61.17	
8	Ma Xuejun	China	59.37	
9	Iryna Yatchenko	Belarus	58.67	
10	Yania Ferrales	Cuba	58.20	
11	Mélina Robert-Michon	France	57.81	
