= 1992 World Junior Championships in Athletics – Women's discus throw =

The women's discus throw event at the 1992 World Junior Championships in Athletics was held in Seoul, South Korea, at Olympic Stadium on 19 and 20 September.

== Medalists ==
Gold	Bao Dongying; China
Silver	Zhang Cuilan; China
Bronze	Sabine Fried; Germany

== Results ==
=== Final ===
20 September

Rank	Name	Nationality	Attempts						Result	Notes
Rank	Name	Nationality	1	2	3	4	5	6	Result	Notes
1st place, gold medalist(s)	Bao Dongying	China	56.68	56.82	58.34	56.86	58.28	56.20	58.34	
2nd place, silver medalist(s)	Zhang Cuilan	China	56.42	53.02	57.06	57.10	56.48	55.62	57.10	
3rd place, bronze medalist(s)	Sabine Fried	Germany	48.12	52.95	53.94	50.50	50.08	x	53.94	
4	Danijela Čurović	FR Yugoslavia	49.18	50.20	52.64	49.06	x	49.34	52.64	
5	Beatrice Faumuina	New Zealand	46.78	50.20	49.88	x	48.70	52.20	52.20	
6	Ulrike Heidelmann	Germany	48.02	50.04	51.64	48.92	49.32	x	51.64	
7	Petra Jurášková	Czechoslovakia	48.96	50.66	50.64	50.48	50.64	51.26	51.26	
8	Adrienne Lynn	New Zealand	x	50.38	46.72	47.80	51.18	x	51.18	
9	Marja Aalto	Finland	45.68	50.02	x				50.02	
10	Suzy Powell	United States	46.84	46.06	45.60				46.84	
11	Karin Hagmann	Switzerland	41.10	x	46.24				46.24	
12	Shelley Drew	United Kingdom	45.52	46.08	46.14				46.14	

=== Qualifications ===
19 Sep

==== Group A ====
Rank	Name	Nationality	Attempts			Result	Notes
Rank	Name	Nationality	1	2	3	Result	Notes
1	Bao Dongying	China	47.56	56.04	-	56.04	Q
2	Ulrike Heidelmann	Germany	50.64	-	-	50.64	Q
3	Marja Aalto	Finland	50.36	-	-	50.36	Q
4	Karin Hagmann	Switzerland	49.24	-	-	49.24	Q
5	Danijela Čurović	FR Yugoslavia	49.19	-	-	49.19	Q
6	Suzy Powell	United States	48.56	45.32	48.86	48.86	q
7	Adrienne Lynn	New Zealand	48.74	x	44.64	48.74	q
8	Shelley Drew	United Kingdom	x	46.04	48.70	48.70	q
9	Viktoriya Boyko	Commonwealth of Independent States	x	45.10	47.60	47.60	
10	Miyoko Nakanishi	Japan	45.26	44.18	44.54	45.26	

==== Group B ====
Rank	Name	Nationality	Attempts			Result	Notes
Rank	Name	Nationality	1	2	3	Result	Notes
1	Zhang Cuilan	China	52.84	-	-	52.84	Q
2	Sabine Fried	Germany	52.10	-	-	52.10	Q
3	Petra Jurášková	Czechoslovakia	50.56	-	-	50.56	Q
4	Beatrice Faumuina	New Zealand	49.80	-	-	49.80	Q
5	Anna Söderberg	Sweden	41.60	48.68	43.56	48.68	
6	Emma Merry	United Kingdom	45.50	48.28	46.98	48.28	
7	Melinda Wirtz	United States	45.60	45.66	46.84	46.84	
8	Katalin Divós	Hungary	45.32	46.38	43.42	46.38	
9	Hüseyin Keskin	Turkey	45.86	44.28	x	45.86	
10	Tsvetomira Zlatareva	Bulgaria	45.16	42.96	43.90	45.16	

== Participation ==
According to an unofficial count, 20 athletes from 15 countries participated in the event.

- Bulgaria (1)
- China (2)
- Commonwealth of Independent States (1)
- Czechoslovakia (1)
- Finland (1)
- Germany (2)
- Hungary (1)
- Japan (1)
- New Zealand (2)
- Sweden (1)
- Switzerland (1)
- Turkey (1)
- United Kingdom (2)
- United States (2)
- FR Yugoslavia (1)
