= 1996 World Junior Championships in Athletics – Women's discus throw =

The women's discus throw event at the 1996 World Junior Championships in Athletics was held in Sydney, Australia, at International Athletic Centre on 24 and 25 August.

== Medalists ==
Gold	Ma Shuli; China
Silver	Seilala Sua; United States
Bronze	Zhang Yaqing; China

== Results ==
=== Final ===
25 August

Rank	Name	Nationality	Attempts						Result	Notes
Rank	Name	Nationality	1	2	3	4	5	6	Result	Notes
1st place, gold medalist(s)	Ma Shuli	China	46.18	x	55.50	56.32	52.18	52.46	56.32	
2nd place, silver medalist(s)	Seilala Sua	United States	51.14	53.56	56.32	x	x	53.82	56.32	
3rd place, bronze medalist(s)	Zhang Yaqing	China	54.26	51.64	x	x	54.08	55.70	55.70	
4	Nadine Beckel	Germany	47.12	52.10	52.98	x	x	52.60	52.98	
5	Lăcrămioara Ionescu	Romania	51.64	50.64	50.76	x	52.86	50.56	52.86	
6	Yuka Murofushi	Japan	47.86	49.64	51.56	49.18	47.26	x	51.56	
7	Lyudmila Rublevskaya	Russia	49.60	50.08	50.96	x	x	51.20	51.20	
8	Barbara Sugár	Hungary	50.84	x	x	x	x	46.00	50.84	
9	Katrina Steele	Australia	49.36	49.68	50.58				50.58	
10	Alani Diloi	Australia	x	43.40	46.78				46.78	
11	Karin Vikne	Norway	44.80	44.16	x				44.80	
12	Roberta Collins	United States	x	x	42.08				42.08	

=== Qualifications ===
24 Aug

==== Group A ====
Rank	Name	Nationality	Attempts			Result	Notes
Rank	Name	Nationality	1	2	3	Result	Notes
1	Seilala Sua	United States	53.98	-	-	53.98	Q
2	Nadine Beckel	Germany	52.64	-	-	52.64	Q
3	Zhang Yaqing	China	51.32	-	-	51.32	Q
4	Lăcrămioara Ionescu	Romania	x	51.28	-	51.28	Q
5	Katrina Steele	Australia	46.24	50.26	-	50.26	Q
6	Karin Vikne	Norway	x	48.46	40.64	48.46	q
7	Satu Järvenpää	Finland	x	43.14	47.44	47.44	
8	Yania Ferrales	Cuba	44.68	x	44.72	44.72	
9	Katiuscia de Jesús	Brazil	x	42.94	x	42.94	
10	Noella Flores	Tahiti	x	33.54	x	33.54	
11	Siniva Marsters	Cook Islands	x	x	27.54	27.54	

==== Group B ====
Rank	Name	Nationality	Attempts			Result	Notes
Rank	Name	Nationality	1	2	3	Result	Notes
1	Ma Shuli	China	x	52.58	-	52.58	Q
2	Yuka Murofushi	Japan	44.74	x	50.78	50.78	Q
3	Barbara Sugár	Hungary	48.04	45.58	50.02	50.02	Q
4	Alani Diloi	Australia	49.78	48.38	47.78	49.78	q
5	Roberta Collins	United States	x	x	49.18	49.18	q
6	Lyudmila Rublevskaya	Russia	x	48.68	46.72	48.68	q
7	Katja Tenhonen	Finland	46.10	47.62	46.42	47.62	
8	Catherine Gery	France	45.70	46.84	45.18	46.84	
9	Philippa Roles	United Kingdom	46.40	x	46.48	46.48	
10	Ileana Brindusoiu	Romania	38.14	45.94	x	45.94	
11	Lindy Leveaux	Seychelles	28.60	33.90	x	33.90	

== Participation ==
According to an unofficial count, 22 athletes from 17 countries participated in the event.

- Australia (2)
- Brazil (1)
- China (2)
- Cook Islands (1)
- Cuba (1)
- Finland (2)
- France (1)
- Germany (1)
- Hungary (1)
- Japan (1)
- Norway (1)
- Romania (2)
- Russia (1)
- Seychelles (1)
- Tahiti (1)
- United Kingdom (1)
- United States (2)
