= Teresa Machado =

Portuguese athlete (1969–2020)

Teresa Machado (22 July 1969 – 28 February 2020) was a Portuguese discus thrower and shot putter. Her personal best discus throw was 65.40 metres, achieved in May 1998 in São Jacinto.

== Competition record ==
Year	Competition	Venue	Position	Event	Notes
Representing Portugal
1987	European Junior Championships	Birmingham, United Kingdom	9th	Shot put	14.15 m
1987	European Junior Championships	Birmingham, United Kingdom	6th	Discus throw	47.12 m
1988	World Junior Championships	Sudbury, Canada	15th (q)	Shot put	13.99 m
1988	World Junior Championships	Sudbury, Canada	9th	Discus throw	48.36 m
1990	European Indoor Championships	Glasgow, United Kingdom	11th	Shot put	15.26 m
1990	European Championships	Split, Yugoslavia	13th	Shot put	14.34 m
1990	European Championships	Split, Yugoslavia	14th (q)	Discus throw	51.78 m
1990	Ibero-American Championships	Manaus, Brazil	3rd	Shot put	15.87 m
1990	Ibero-American Championships	Manaus, Brazil	1st	Discus throw	53.92 m
1991	World Championships	Tokyo, Japan	24th (q)	Discus throw	53.64 m
1992	European Indoor Championships	Genoa, Italy	12th	Shot put	15.80 m
1992	Ibero-American Championships	Seville, Spain	4th	Discus throw	56.92 m
1992	Olympic Games	Barcelona, Spain	21st (q)	Discus throw	59.50 m
1993	World Championships	Stuttgart, Germany	26th (q)	Discus throw	56.02 m
1994	Ibero-American Championships	Mar del Plata, Argentina	5th	Shot put	15.34 m
1994	Ibero-American Championships	Mar del Plata, Argentina	1st	Discus throw	61.20 m
1995	World Championships	Gothenburg, Sweden	17th (q)	Discus throw	58.68 m
1996	Olympic Games	Atlanta, United States	23rd (q)	Shot put	15.91 m
1996	Olympic Games	Atlanta, United States	10th	Discus throw	61.38 m
1997	World Championships	Athens, Greece	6th	Discus throw	62.00 m
1998	Ibero-American Championships	Lisbon, Portugal	3rd	Shot put	16.15 m
1998	Ibero-American Championships	Lisbon, Portugal	1st	Discus throw	61.67 m
1998	European Championships	Budapest, Hungary	9th	Discus throw	60.90 m
1999	World Championships	Seville, Spain	22nd (q)	Discus throw	57.84 m
2000	Olympic Games	Sydney	11th	Discus throw	59.50 m
2001	World Championships	Edmonton, Canada	15th (q)	Discus throw	59.74 m
2002	European Championships	Munich, Germany	7th	Discus throw	60.41 m
2003	World Championships	Paris, France	10th	Discus throw	59.46 m
2004	Ibero-American Championships	Huelva, Spain	2nd	Discus throw	57.81 m
2004	Olympic Games	Athens, Greece	23rd (q)	Discus throw	58.47 m
