= Oksana Andrusina-Mert =

Turkish discus thrower

Personal information
- Nationality: Turkey
- Born: Oksana Andrusina; Оксана Андруcина; March 26, 1973 (age 53) Russia
- Height: 185 cm (6 ft 1 in)
- Weight: 95 kg (209 lb)

Sport
- Sport: Discus throw
- Club: Fenerbahçe Athletics

Achievements and titles
- Personal best: 64.25 m NR (1999)

Oksana Andrusina-Mert, née Oksana Andrusina (Russian: Оксана Андруcина; born March 26, 1973), aka Oksana Mert, Oksana Tuchak or formerly Aksel Mert, is a Turkish female discus thrower of Russian origin. She is 185 cm (6 ft 1 in) tall at 95 kg (209 lb).

She became Turkish citizen by marriage on July 27, 1998 and adopted the Turkish name Aksel Mert. She competed for Fenerbahçe Athletics team.

She is the holder of national record in discus throw set on May 30, 1999 in Krasnodar, Russia. She participated at the 2000 Summer Olympics in Sydney, Australia without success.

== Achievements ==
- 57.31 m – 1999 World Championships in Athletics, Sevilla, Spain 23 August 1999 – 13th
- 55.02 m – 2000 Summer Olympics-Qualification round B, Sydney, Australia 25 September 2000

== Personal best ==
- 64.25 m NR Krasnodar 1999
