= Boit =

Boit or Boiţ is a surname. Notable people with the surname include:

- Charles Boit (1662–1727), Swedish painter
- Cristina Boiț (born 1968), Romanian discus thrower
- Elizabeth Boit (1849–1932), American textile manufacturer
- Mike Boit (born 1949), Kenyan middle-distance athlete
- Philip Boit (born 1971), Kenyan cross-county skier
- Wilson Boit Kipketer (born 1973) Kenyan middle and long-distance athlete
