= 2006 European Athletics Championships – Women's discus throw =

Women's discus throw at the European Athletics Championships

The women's discus throw at the 2006 European Athletics Championships were held at the Ullevi on August 8 and August 10.

== Medalists ==
Gold	Silver	Bronze
Darya Pishchalnikova; Russia	Franka Dietzsch; Germany	Nicoleta Grasu; Romania

== Schedule ==
Date	Time	Round
August 10, 2006	10:10	Qualification
August 12, 2006	19:30	Final

== Results ==
=== Qualification ===
Qualification: Qualifying Performance 61.00 (Q) or at least 12 best performers (q) advance to the final.

Rank	Group	Athlete	Nationality	#1	#2	#3	Result	Notes
1	A	Franka Dietzsch	Germany	65.93			65.93	Q
2	B	Dragana Tomašević	Serbia	56.37	63.63		63.63	Q, NR
3	A	Nicoleta Grasu	Romania	x	x	63.27	63.27	Q
4	B	Anna Söderberg	Sweden	59.71	59.41	62.26	62.26	Q
5	B	Wioletta Potępa	Poland	x	62.01		62.01	Q
6	A	Joanna Wisniewska	Poland	61.83			61.83	Q, SB
7	B	Nataliya Semenova	Ukraine	58.08	55.24	61.11	61.11	Q
8	A	Iryna Yatchenko	Belarus	61.00			61.00	Q
9	A	Kateryna Karsak	Ukraine	58.04	60.91	57.33	60.91	q
10	B	Věra Cechlová	Czech Republic	x	60.45	57.83	60.45	q
11	A	Darya Pishchalnikova	Russia	57.18	57.79	59.15	59.15	q
12	B	Ellina Zvereva	Belarus	x	x	58.72	58.72	q
13	B	Veronika Watzek	Austria	53.55	57.20	x	57.20	PB
14	A	Vera Begić	Croatia	48.71	x	55.61	55.61	
15	A	Laura Bordignon	Italy	55.50	55.42	53.80	55.50	
16	A	Grete Etholm Snyder	Norway	52.84	x	54.44	54.44	
17	B	Mélina Robert-Michon	France	x	53.55	53.77	53.77	
18	B	Zinaida Sendriūtė	Lithuania	53.22	x	x	53.22	
19	B	Sivan Jean	Israel	x	47.70	49.98	49.98	

=== Final ===
Rank	Athlete	Nationality	#1	#2	#3	#4	#5	#6	Result	Notes
1st place, gold medalist(s)	Darya Pishchalnikova	Russia	55.76	55.40	60.81	65.55	x	61.05	65.55	PB
2nd place, silver medalist(s)	Franka Dietzsch	Germany	63.88	x	x	62.58	64.35	x	64.35	
3rd place, bronze medalist(s)	Nicoleta Grasu	Romania	63.58	x	x	62.99	x	62.48	63.58	
4	Kateryna Karsak	Ukraine	61.66	60.40	x	56.76	62.45	x	62.45	
5	Wioletta Potępa	Poland	61.03	57.88	61.78	61.20	56.75	x	61.78	
6	Ellina Zvereva	Belarus	61.29	61.72	59.26	x	59.69	x	61.72	
7	Věra Cechlová	Czech Republic	58.36	60.54	57.08	56.04	60.71	x	60.71	
8	Dragana Tomašević	Serbia	60.20	56.87	x	59.77	59.52	x	60.20	
9	Nataliya Semenova	Ukraine	59.12	59.99	x				59.99	
10	Iryna Yatchenko	Belarus	59.65	x	x				59.65	
11	Anna Söderberg	Sweden	53.06	x	59.60				59.60	
12	Joanna Wisniewska	Poland	x	59.41	x				59.41	
