= Yania Ferrales =

Cuban discus thrower (born 1977)

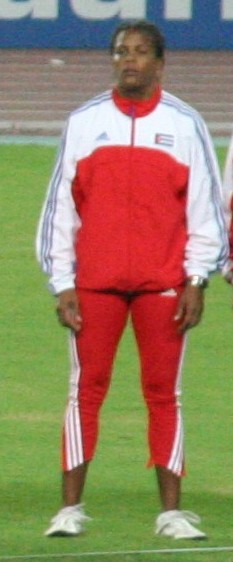
- Yania Ferrales in 2007

Personal information
- Full name: Yania Ferrales Monteagudo
- Born: 28 July 1977 (age 48) Morón, Ciego de Ávila
- Height: 1.80 m (5 ft 11 in)
- Weight: 82 kg (181 lb)

Sport
- Country: Cuba
- Sport: Athletics
Medal record
Athletics
Representing Cuba
Pan American Games
Silver medal – second place	2007 Rio de Janeiro	Discus throw
Bronze medal – third place	2003 Santo Domingo	Discus throw
Central American and Caribbean Games
Gold medal – first place	2006 Cartagena	Discus throw
CAC Junior Championships (U20)
Gold medal – first place	1996 San Salvador	Discus throw
- Updated on 14 June 2013

Yania Ferrales Monteagudo (born 28 July 1977) is a Cuban discus thrower.

Her personal best throw is 66.00 metres, achieved in February 2006 in Havana.

== Personal bests ==
- Discus throw: 66.00 – (Cuba) La Habana, 10 February 2006

== Achievements ==
Year	Competition	Venue	Position	Event	Notes
Representing Cuba
1996	Central American and Caribbean Junior Championships (U-20)	San Salvador, El Salvador	1st	Discus	48.54 m
1996	World Junior Championships	Sydney, Australia	18th (q)	Discus	44.72 m
2001	Central American and Caribbean Championships	Guatemala City, Guatemala	1st	Discus	56.34 m A
2002	Ibero-American Championships	Guatemala City, Guatemala	2nd	Discus	57.63 m A
2003	Central American and Caribbean Championships	St. George's, Grenada	1st	Discus	59.07 m
2003	Pan American Games	Santo Domingo, Dominican Republic	3rd	Discus	60.03 m
2004	Ibero-American Championships	Huelva, Spain	1st	Discus	61.11 m
2004	Olympic Games	Athens, Greece	–	Discus	NM
2005	World Championships	Helsinki, Finland	8th (q)	Discus	58.38 m
2006	Central American and Caribbean Games	Cartagena, Colombia	1st	Discus	59.70 m
2006	World Cup	Athens, Greece	7th	Discus	58.93 m
2007	ALBA Games	Caracas, Venezuela	1st	Discus	64.18 m
2007	World Championships	Osaka, Japan	10th	Discus	58.20 m
2007	Pan American Games	Rio de Janeiro, Brazil	2nd	Discus	61.71 m
2008	Central American and Caribbean Championships	Cali, Colombia	2nd	Discus	58.73 m
2008	Olympic Games	Beijing, PR China	7th (q)	Discus	59.87 m
2009	Central American and Caribbean Championships	Havana, Cuba	out of competition	Discus	63.12 m
2009	World Championships	Berlin, Germany	12th (q)	Discus	58.24 m
