= Ma Shuli =

Chinese discus thrower (born 1978)

Ma Shuli (born 20 January 1978) is a Chinese discus thrower.

Her personal best throw is 62.50 metres, achieved in April 2005 in Zhongshan. The Chinese, and Asian, record is currently held by Xiao Yanling with 71.68 metres.

== Achievements ==
Year	Competition	Venue	Position	Notes
Representing China
1996	World Junior Championships	Sydney, Australia	1st	56.32 m
2002	Asian Games	Busan, South Korea	3rd	59.89 m
2005	World Championships	Helsinki, Finland	6th	61.33 m
