= Ekaterini Voggoli =

Greek discus thrower (born 1970)

Personal information
- Born: October 30, 1970 (age 55) Larissa, Greece

Sport
- Sport: Track and field
Medal record
World Championships
| Bronze medal – third place | 2003 Paris | Discus throw |
European Championships
| Gold medal – first place | 2002 Munich | Discus throw |
Mediterranean Games
| Silver medal – second place | 1993 Narbonne | Discus throw |

Ekaterini Voggoli (Greek: Αικατερίνη Βόγγολη, [ekateˈrini ˈvoŋɡoli], born October 30, 1970) is a retired Greek discus thrower.

She was the 2002 European champion and 2003 World bronze medalist. In June 2004 she beat Anastasia Kelesidou's Greek record by 2 centimetres, throwing 67.72 metres in Athens.

== Achievements ==
| Year | Competition | Venue | Position | Notes |
Representing Greece
| 1993 | Mediterranean Games | Narbonne, France | 2nd | 56.10 m |
| 1996 | Olympic Games | Atlanta, United States | 22nd | 58.70 m |
| 1999 | World Championships | Seville, Spain | 11th | 61.00 m |
| 2000 | Olympic Games | Sydney, Australia | 9th | 61.57 m |
| 2001 | World Championships | Edmonton, Canada | 14th | 59.98 m |
| 2002 | European Championships | Munich, Germany | 1st | 64.31 m |
| 2002 | World Cup | Madrid, Spain | 2nd | 61.77 m |
| 2003 | World Championships | Paris, France | 3rd | 66.73 m (PB) |
| 2003 | World Athletics Final | Monte Carlo, Monaco | 3rd | 63.55 m |
| 2004 | Olympic Games | Athens, Greece | 7th | 62.37 m |
| 2004 | World Athletics Final | Monte Carlo, Monaco | 8th | 59.14 m |
