= Luan Zhili =

Chinese discus thrower (born 1973)

Personal information
- National team: China
- Citizenship: Chinese
- Born: January 6, 1974 (age 51)

Sport
- Country: China
- Sport: Discus throw
- Event: Athletics at the East Asian Games
- Updated on 1 June 2017

Luan Zhili (born 6 January 1973) is a female discus thrower from PR China. She finished ninth at the 1997 World Championships and won the 1998 Asian Games, the latter in a personal best throw of 63.43 metres. The Chinese, and Asian, record is currently held by Xiao Yanling with 71.68 metres.

== Achievements ==
Year	Competition	Venue	Position	Notes
Representing China
1997	East Asian Games	Busan, South Korea	2nd	61.94 m
