= Huang Qun (discus thrower) =

Chinese discus thrower (born 1979)

Huang Qun (born 10 April 1979) is a Chinese discus thrower.

She competed at the 2004 Olympic Games, but without reaching the final round.

From June 2006 to June 2008 she was suspended for a doping offense.

Her personal best throw is 64.53 metres (211.7 ft), achieved in October 2005 in Nanjing, China. The Chinese and Asian record is currently held by Xiao Yanling at 71.68 metres (235.2 ft).
