= Anna Söderberg =

Swedish discus thrower

Personal information
- Born: 11 June 1973 (age 53) Fjugesta, Sweden

Sport
- Sport: Track and field

Anna Therese Söderberg (born 11 June 1973) is a Swedish former discus thrower. Her personal best throw of 64.54 metres, achieved in July 1999 in Aremark, is the Swedish record for the event. She has represented her country at the Olympic Games on three occasions – in 2000, 2004 and 2008. She has also competed at the World Championships in Athletics, taking part in every edition from 1997 to 2009 with the sole exception of the 2001 World Championships.

Söderberg competed for the Northern Arizona Lumberjacks track and field team, where she won the program's first NCAA DI individual title in any track event.

At European level, she has taken part in the quadrennial European Athletics Championships three times; her best performance at the competition is eleventh place, which she achieved in both 2006 and 2010. Söderberg has been ever-present on the national scene and won every discus contest at the Swedish Athletics Championships from 1993 to 2010 – an unrivalled streak of eighteen straight victories. She has a similar pedigree at the Finland-Sweden athletics international and she won her 17th discus title at the competition in 2010. She opted to have shoulder surgery at the end of the year in order to resolve an ongoing complaint.

== Achievements ==
Year	Competition	Venue	Position	Notes
Representing Sweden
1992	World Junior Championships	Seoul, South Korea	13th (q)	48.68 m
1997	World Championships	Athens, Greece	11th	58.22 m
1999	World Championships	Seville, Spain	9th (qualifiers)	59.65 m
2000	Olympic Games	Sydney, Australia	24th	56.11 m
2002	European Championships	Munich, Germany	15th	55.55 m
2003	World Championships	Paris, France	8th	61.61 m
2004	Olympic Games	Athens, Greece	35th	55.49 m
2005	World Championships	Helsinki, Finland	11th	57.41 m
2006	European Championships	Gothenburg, Sweden	11th	59.60 m
2006	World Athletics Final	Stuttgart, Germany	3rd	61.50 m
2007	World Championships	Osaka, Japan	10th (qualifiers)	58.65 m
2007	World Athletics Final	Stuttgart, Germany	7th	57.54 m
2008	Olympic Games	Beijing, PR China	31st	55.28 m
2008	World Athletics Final	Stuttgart, Germany	5th	57.40 m
2009	World Championships	Berlin, Germany	14th (qualifiers)	57.92 m
2010	European Championships	Barcelona, Spain	11th	55.60 m
