= Shelley Newman =

English discus thrower (born 1973)

Shelley Newman/Parr (née Drew)
Personal information
- Nationality: British (English)
- Born: 8 August 1973 (age 53) Carshalton, London, England
- Height: 182 cm (6 ft 0 in)
- Weight: 87 kg (192 lb)

Sport
- Sport: Athletics
- Event: discus throw
- Club: Belgrave Harriers
Medal record
Athletics
Representing England
Commonwealth Games
Bronze medal – third place	2002 Manchester	discus

Shelley Jean Newman, now Parr and (née Drew), (born 8 August 1973) is a female retired discus thrower from England and competed for Great Britain at the 2004 Summer Olympics.

== Athletics career ==
Born in Carshalton, London, her personal best throw is 61.22 metres, achieved in June 2003 in Loughborough. This was the English record for many years and at the time and placed her fourth on the British outdoor all-time list, behind Meg Ritchie, Venissa Head and Philippa Roles. She represented England in the discus event, at the 1998 Commonwealth Games in Kuala Lumpur, Malaysia. Four years later she won a bronze medal at the 2002 Commonwealth Games in Manchester.

Drew was six-times British discus throw champion after winning the UK Championship in 1997 and the British AAA Championships title in 1998, 1999, 2000, 2001 and 2003 (the last as Shelley Newman).

== Personal life ==
Shelley has a degree in physiology, which she gained at the University of Birmingham in 1994. She earned her doctorate in the subject in 1999 and became a Professorial Fellow in Medical Education in 2016. She currently works as the Director of the Centre for Higher Education Practice at the University of Southampton. Previously she held posts at the University of Birmingham and, until 2007, Cardiff University.

== International competitions ==
Year	Competition	Venue	Position	Notes
Representing Great Britain and England
1992	World Junior Championships	Seoul, South Korea	12th	46.14 m
1997	World Championships	Athens, Greece	22nd (q)	53.96 m
1997	Universiade	Catania, Italy	11th	52.14 m
1998	European Championships	Budapest, Hungary	27th (q)	53.13 m
1998	Commonwealth Games	Kuala Lumpur, Malaysia	4th	56.13 m
1999	Universiade	Palma de Mallorca, Spain	11th	55.04 m
2002	European Championships	Munich, Germany	10th	57.38 m
2002	Commonwealth Games	Manchester, United Kingdom	3rd	58.13 m
2003	World Championships	Paris, France	19th (q)	57.65 m
2004	Olympic Games	Athens, Greece	33rd (q)	56.04 m
