= Věra Pospíšilová-Cechlová =

Czech athletics competitor

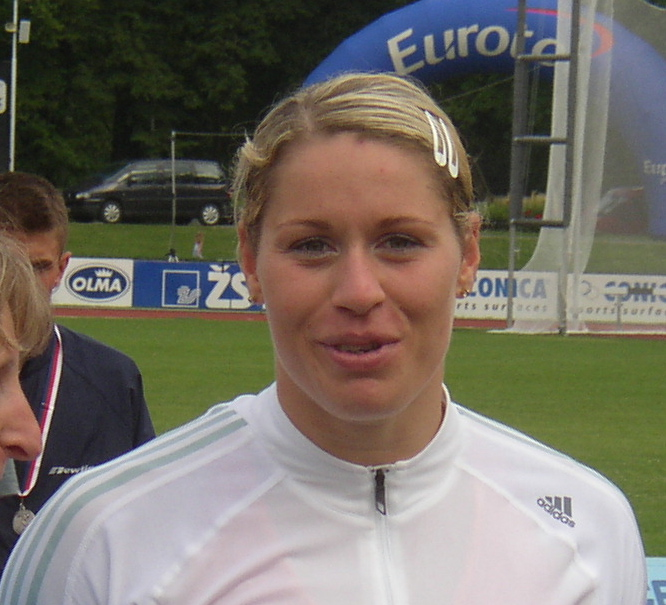

Personal information
- Born: 19 November 1978 (age 47)
- Height: 1.76 m (5 ft 9 1/2 in)
- Weight: 80 kg (176 lb)

Sport
- Country: Czech Republic
- Sport: Athletics
- Event: Discus
Medal record
Olympic Games
Bronze medal – third place	2004 Athens	Discus
World Championships
Bronze medal – third place	2005 Helsinki	Discus
- Updated on 14 August 2012

Věra Pospíšilová-Cechlová (Czech pronunciation: [ˈvjɛra ˈpospiːʃɪlovaː ˈtsɛxlovaː]) (born 19 November 1978 in Litoměřice as Věra Pospíšilová) is a Czech athlete, competing in the discus throw and the shot put. She married Czech professional wrestler Jakub Cechl on 17 October 2003.

In August 2005 she won a bronze medal at the 2005 World Championships in Athletics. Her personal best distances are 67.71 m for the discus and 16.92 m for the shot put.

== Competition record ==
Year	Competition	Venue	Position	Notes
Representing the Czech Republic
1997	European Junior Championships	Ljubljana, Slovenia	8th	46.08 m
1999	European U23 Championships	Gothenburg, Sweden	3rd	56.65 m
2001	World Championships	Edmonton, Canada	6th	61.47 m
2002	European Championships	Munich, Germany	4th	62.31 m
2003	World Championships	Paris, France	5th	65.55 m
2004	Olympic Games	Athens, Greece	3rd	66.08 m
2005	World Championships	Helsinki, Finland	3rd	63.19 m
2006	European Championships	Gothenburg, Sweden	7th	60.71 m
2007	World Championships	Osaka, Japan	21st (q)	57.56 m
2008	Olympic Games	Beijing, China	5th	61.75 m
2009	World Championships	Berlin, Germany	18th (q)	59.52 m
2010	European Championships	Barcelona, Spain	–	NM
2011	World Championships	Daegu, South Korea	23rd (q)	53.87 m
2012	European Championships	Helsinki, Finland	7th	60.08 m
2012	Olympic Games	London, United Kingdom	34th (q)	55.00 m

Sporting positions
Preceded by (Belarus) Irina Yatchenko	Women's Discus Best Year Performance; 2005	Succeeded by (Germany) Franka Dietzsch
