= 2003 IAAF World Athletics Final =

International track and field competition

The 1st IAAF World Athletics Final was held at the Stade Louis II, in Fontvieille, Monaco on 13 September and 14 September 2003. It was the series finale for the 2003 IAAF World Outdoor Meetings and the successor tournament to the 2002 IAAF Grand Prix Final.

The hammer throw event for men and women had to take place in Szombathely, Hungary a week previous as the Monaco stadium was not large enough to hold the event.

One of the biggest shocks came in the pole vault where current world record holder Yelena Isinbayeva failed to take a medal after only managing to clear 4.50 metres.

== Medal summary ==
=== Men ===
Event	Gold		Silver		Bronze	
100 m	Bernard Williams; United States	10.04	John Capel; United States	10.05	Uchenna Emedolu; Nigeria	10.08
200 m	Joshua Johnson; United States	20.35	Shawn Crawford; United States	20.37	Stéphan Buckland; Mauritius	20.44
400 m	Jerome Young; United States	45.25	Michael Blackwood; Jamaica	45.25	Alleyne Francique; Grenada	45.67
800 m	Wilfred Bungei; Kenya	1:45.97	Joseph Mutua; Kenya	1:46.13	André Bucher; Switzerland	1:46.28
1500 m	Paul Korir; Kenya	3:40.09	Alex Kipchirchir; Kenya	3:40.21	Ivan Heshko; Ukraine	3:40.72
3000 m	Kenenisa Bekele; Ethiopia	7:36.98	John Kibowen; Kenya	7:38.21	Abraham Chebii; Kenya	7:39.28
5000 m	Eliud Kipchoge; Kenya	13:23.34	Richard Limo; Kenya	13:23.95	Gebregziabher Gebremariam; Ethiopia	13:24.13
110 m hurdles	Allen Johnson; United States	13.11	Terrence Trammell; United States	13.17	Staņislavs Olijars; Latvia	13.25
400 m hurdles	Félix Sánchez; Dominican Republic	47.80	Kemel Thompson; Jamaica	48.50	Danny McFarlane; Jamaica	48.66
3000 m s'chase	Saif Saaeed Shaheen; Qatar	7:57.38	Paul Kipsiele Koech; Kenya	7:57.42	Ezekiel Kemboi; Kenya	8:11.79
Pole vault	Tim Lobinger; Germany	5.91 m	Okkert Brits; South Africa	5.86 m	Dmitri Markov; Australia	5.76 m
High jump	Yaroslav Rybakov; Russia	2.30 m	Stefan Holm; Sweden	2.30 m	Jamie Nieto; United States	2.30 m
Long jump	Dwight Phillips; United States	8.31 m	Hussein Taher Al-Sabee; Saudi Arabia	8.30 m	Ignisious Gaisah; Ghana	8.26 m NR
Triple jump	Christian Olsson; Sweden	17.55 m	Walter Davis; United States	17.09 m	Kenta Bell; United States	16.95 m
Shot put	Christian Cantwell; United States	20.93 m	Yuriy Bilonoh; Ukraine	20.53 m	Andrei Mikhnevich; Belarus	20.51 m
Discus throw	Virgilijus Alekna; Lithuania	68.30 m	Róbert Fazekas; Hungary	66.08 m	Vasiliy Kaptyukh; Belarus	65.85 m
Javelin throw	Sergey Makarov; Russia	85.66 m	Jan Železný; Czech Republic	84.33 m	Boris Henry; Germany	81.00 m
Hammer throw	Adrián Annus; Hungary	82.10 m	Libor Charfreitag; Slovakia	81.22 m	Ivan Tikhon; Belarus	80.84 m

=== Women ===
Event	Gold		Silver		Bronze	
100 m	Chryste Gaines; United States	10.86	Christine Arron; France	11.04	Torri Edwards; United States	11.06
200 m	Muriel Hurtis; France	22.41	Anastasiya Kapachinskaya; Russia	22.57	Torri Edwards; United States	22.58
400 m	Ana Guevara; Mexico	49.34	Lorraine Fenton; Jamaica	50.29	Tonique Williams; Bahamas	50.87
800 m	Maria de Lurdes Mutola; Mozambique	1:59.59	Kelly Holmes; Great Britain	1:59.92	Mina Aït Hammou; Morocco	1:59.97
1500 m	Süreyya Ayhan; Turkey	3:57.72	Jackline Maranga; Kenya	4:01.48	Hayley Tullett; Great Britain	4::01.60
3000 m	Edith Masai; Kenya	8:36.82	Yelena Zadorozhnaya; Russia	8:37.40	Joanne Pavey; Great Britain	8:37.89
5000 m	Elvan Abeylegesse; Turkey	14:56.25	Derartu Tulu; Ethiopia	14:56.93	Tirunesh Dibaba; Ethiopia	14:57.87
100 m hurdles	Gail Devers; United States	12.45	Glory Alozie; Spain	12.66	Miesha McKelvy; United States	12.69
400 m hurdles	Sandra Glover; United States	53.65	Andrea Blackett; Barbados	54.28	Ionela Târlea; Romania	54.44
Pole vault	Tatyana Polnova; Russia	4.68 m	Svetlana Feofanova; Russia	4.60 m	Stacy Dragila; United States	4.50 m
High jump	Hestrie Cloete; South Africa	2.01 m	Vita Palamar; Ukraine	2.01 m	Kajsa Bergqvist; Sweden	1.99 m
Long jump	Eunice Barber; France	7.05 m NR	Tatyana Kotova; Russia	6.92 m	Grace Upshaw; United States	6.60 m
Triple jump	Tatyana Lebedeva; Russia	15.13 m	Yamilé Aldama; Cuba	14.99 m	Françoise Mbango Etone; Cameroon	14.83 m
Shot put	Vita Pavlysh; Ukraine	19.86 m	Svetlana Krivelyova; Russia	19.66 m	Nadzeya Astapchuk; Belarus	19.51 m
Discus throw	Věra Pospíšilová; Czech Republic	65.42 m	Aretha Hill; United States	65.20 m	Ekaterini Voggoli; Greece	63.55 m
Javelin throw	Tatyana Shikolenko; Russia	64.47 m	Steffi Nerius; Germany	64.25 m	Nikolett Szabó; Hungary	62.88 m
Hammer throw	Yipsi Moreno; Cuba	73.42 m	Olga Kuzenkova; Russia	71.16 m	Mihaela Melinte; Romania	69.27 m

== Medals table ==
Rank	Nation	Gold	Silver	Bronze	Total
1	United States	9	5	7	21
2	Russia	5	6	0	11
3	Kenya	4	6	2	12
4	France	2	1	0	3
5	Turkey	2	0	0	2
6	Ukraine	1	2	1	4
7	Ethiopia	1	1	2	4
8	Germany	1	1	1	3
8	Hungary	1	1	1	3
8	Sweden	1	1	1	3
11	Cuba	1	1	0	2
11	Czech Republic	1	1	0	2
11	South Africa	1	1	0	2
14	Dominican Republic	1	0	0	1
14	Lithuania	1	0	0	1
14	Mexico	1	0	0	1
14	Mozambique	1	0	0	1
14	Qatar	1	0	0	1
19	Jamaica	0	3	1	4
20	Great Britain	0	1	2	3
21	Barbados	0	1	0	1
21	Saudi Arabia	0	1	0	1
21	Slovakia	0	1	0	1
21	Spain	0	1	0	1
25	Belarus	0	0	4	4
26	Romania	0	0	2	2
27	Australia	0	0	1	1
27	Bahamas	0	0	1	1
27	Cameroon	0	0	1	1
27	Ghana	0	0	1	1
27	Greece	0	0	1	1
27	Grenada	0	0	1	1
27	Latvia	0	0	1	1
27	Mauritius	0	0	1	1
27	Morocco	0	0	1	1
27	Nigeria	0	0	1	1
27	Switzerland	0	0	1	1
Totals (37 entries)		35	35	35	105
