= Nicoleta Grasu =

Romanian discus thrower

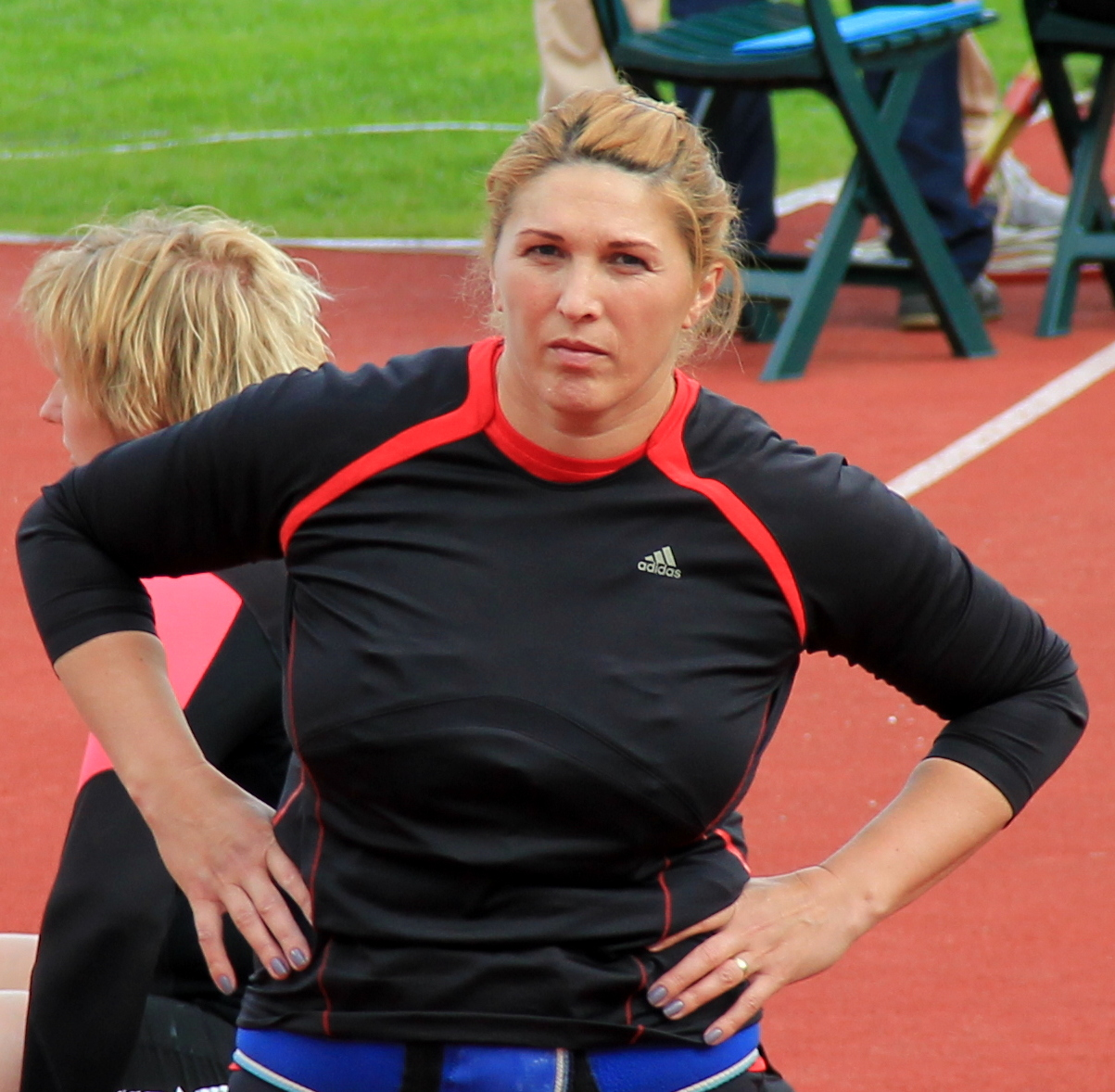
- Nicoleta Grasu at 2012 Bislett Games

Personal information
- Full name: Lenuța Nicoleta Grasu
- Nationality: Romanian
- Born: Lenuța Nicoleta Grădinaru; 11 September 1971 (age 55) Secuieni, Romania
- Height: 1.83 m (6 ft 0 in)
- Weight: 100 kg (220 lb)
- Spouse: Costel Grasu

Sport
- Country: Romania
- Sport: Athletics
- Event: Discus

Achievements and titles
- Personal best: 68.80 m (1999)
Medal record
Women's Athletics
Representing Romania
World Championships
Silver medal – second place	2001 Edmonton	Discus
Bronze medal – third place	1999 Seville	Discus
Bronze medal – third place	2007 Osaka	Discus
Bronze medal – third place	2009 Berlin	Discus
European Championships
Silver medal – second place	2010 Barcelona	Discus
Bronze medal – third place	1998 Budapest	Discus
Bronze medal – third place	2006 Gothenburg	Discus
European Cup Winter Throwing
Gold medal – first place	2008 Split	Discus
Universiade
Gold medal – first place	1999 Palma de Mallorca	Discus
Bronze medal – third place	1997 Catania	Discus
- Updated on 14 August 2012

Lenuţa Nicoleta Grasu (née Grădinaru, born 11 September 1971) is a retired Romanian discus thrower.

Grasu is best known for winning medals at the 1999 and 2001 World Championships. A few years followed without any international medals, but she did finish sixth at the 2004 Summer Olympics and fifth at the 2005 World Championships. In 2006, she returned to the medal podium with a bronze at the European Championships.

Her personal best throw is 68.80 metres, achieved in August 1999 in Poiana Braşov.

== International competitions ==
Year	Competition	Venue	Position	Notes
Representing Romania
1990	World Junior Championships	Plovdiv, Bulgaria	6th	53.10 m
1992	Olympic Games	Barcelona, Spain	13th (q)	60.62 m
1993	World Championships	Stuttgart, Germany	7th	62.10 m
1994	European Championships	Helsinki, Finland	4th	63.64 m
1994	Jeux de la Francophonie	Bondoufle, France	1st	60.80 m
1996	Olympic Games	Atlanta, United States	7th	63.28 m
1996	IAAF Grand Prix Final	Milan, Italy	3rd	63.64 m
1997	World Championships	Athens, Greece	10th	60.14 m
1997	Universiade	Catania, Italy	3rd	60.08 m
1998	European Championships	Budapest, Hungary	3rd	65.94 m
1999	Universiade	Palma de Mallorca, Spain	1st	65.21 m
1999	World Championships	Sevilla, Spain	3rd	65.35 m
2000	Olympic Games	Sydney, Australia	19th (q)	58.87 m
2001	Jeux de la Francophonie	Ottawa, Canada	1st	64.53 m
2001	World Championships	Edmonton, Canada	2nd	66.24 m
2004	Olympic Games	Athens, Greece	5th	64.92 m
2005	World Championships	Helsinki, Finland	5th	62.05 m
2005	World Athletics Final	Monte Carlo, Monaco	5th	58.25 m
2006	European Championships	Gothenburg, Sweden	3rd	63.58 m
2006	World Athletics Final	Stuttgart, Germany	2nd	62.32 m
2007	World Championships	Osaka, Japan	3rd	63.40 m
2008	Olympic Games	Beijing, China	12th	58.63 m
2009	World Championships	Berlin, Germany	3rd	65.20 m
2010	European Cup Winter Throwing	Arles, France	3rd	59.92 m
2010	European Championships	Barcelona, Spain	2nd	63.48 m
2011	World Championships	Daegu, South Korea	8th	62.08 m
2012	Olympic Games	London, United Kingdom	14th (q)	61.86 m
2013	World Championships	Moscow, Russia	22nd (q)	56.31 m

== Personal ==
She was born in Secuieni and she is married fellow discus thrower Costel Grasu. Nicoleta and Costel's child Ștefan Grasu is a professional basketball player.

Sporting positions
Preceded by (Russia) Natalya Sadova	Women's Discus Best Year Performance; 2000	Succeeded by (Russia) Natalya Sadova
