= Vladimíra Racková =

Czech discus thrower

Vladimíra Racková, née Malátová (born 15 May 1967, in Opava) is a Czech discus thrower. Her personal best throw is 65.50 metres, achieved in June 2001 in Kladno.

== International competitions ==
Year	Competition	Venue	Position	Notes
Representing Czechoslovakia
1991	World Championships	Tokyo, Japan	14th	58.38 m
Representing Czech Republic
1993	World Championships	Stuttgart, Germany	9th	61.10 m
2000	Olympic Games	Sydney, Australia	14th	60.24 m
2001	World Championships	Edmonton, Canada	11th	56.43 m
2002	European Championships	Munich, Germany	8th	59.28 m
2004	Olympic Games	Athens, Greece	34th	55.82 m
