= Alison Lever =

Australian athlete

Personal information
- Nationality: Australian
- Born: 13 October 1972 (age 53) Oldham, Greater Manchester.

Sport
- Sport: Athletics
- Event: Discus throw
- Club: QAS
Medal record
Women's athletics
Commonwealth Games
Bronze medal – third place	1998 Kuala Lumpur	Discus

Alison Lever (born 13 October 1972) is an Australian former athlete. She competed in the women's discus throw at the 2000 Summer Olympics. She competed in three Commonwealth Games in 1994 1998 and 2002. She won a bronze medal in Kuala Lumpur 1998.
