= Styliani Tsikouna =

Greek discus thrower (born 1972)

Personal information
- Nickname: Stella
- Born: 19 October 1972 (age 54) Chalcis, Greece
- Education: University of Texas at El Paso

Achievements and titles
- Personal bests: Discus: 65.25 metres (214.1 ft); Shot put: 15.89 meters (52.1 ft)
Medal record
Women's Athletics
Representing Greece
Mediterranean Games
Silver medal – second place	1997 Bari	Discus throw
Summer Universiade
Bronze medal – third place	1999 Palma de Mallorca	Discus throw

Styliani "Stella" Tsikouna (Greek: Στυλιανή "Στέλλα" Τσικούνα also written Stiliani Tsikouna, born October 19, 1972) is a retired Greek discus thrower and still active tenpin bowler.

== Career ==
=== Discus throw ===
Her personal best throw is 65.25 metres, achieved in May 2004 in Iraklio. This ranks her third among Greek discus throwers, only behind Ekaterini Voggoli and Anastasia Kelesidou. Her best international performances are second place at the 1997 Mediterranean Games and 5th place at the 2000 Sydney Olympics.

=== Bowling ===
After retiring from Athletics Tsikouna began the sport of Bowling. In 2014 she finished 3d in the Mediterranean Bowling Championships in Gibraltar.

== Personal life ==
Tsikouna was born in the city of Chalcis in the Central Greece Region. She has one younger sister. She has one son.

From 1992 to 1994 she was enrolled at the University of Texas at El Paso, competing for UTEP Miners. 20 years old she finished 5th at det 1993 NCAA Division I Outdoor Track and Field Championships in New Orleans, Louisiana.

== Achievements ==
=== Discus ===
Year	Competition	Venue	Position	Notes
Representing Greece
1996	Olympic Games	Atlanta, United States	31st	56.66 m
1997	World Championships	Athens, Greece	7th	61.92 m
1997	Mediterranean Games	Bari, Italy	2nd	61.96 m
1998	European Championships	Budapest, Hungary	12th	57.07 m
1999	World Championships	Seville, Spain	8th	63.43 m
1999	Summer Universiade	Palma de Mallorca, Spain	3rd	61.59 m
2000	Olympic Games	Sydney, Australia	5th	64.08 m
2001	World Championships	Edmonton, Canada	18th	60.32 m
2004	Olympic Games	Athens, Greece	11th	59.48 m

=== Bowling ===
Year	Competition	Venue	Position	Notes
Representing Greece
2014	Mediterranean Games	Gibraltar	1st	Team mixed
2014	Mediterranean Games	Gibraltar	3rd	Women doubles
