= Anastasia Kelesidou =

Greek former discus thrower

Medal record

Women's athletics

Representing Greece

Olympic Games
Silver medal – second place	2000 Sydney	Discus
Silver medal – second place	2004 Athens	Discus

World Championships
Silver medal – second place	1999 Seville	Discus
Silver medal – second place	2003 Paris	Discus
Bronze medal – third place	2001 Edmonton	Discus

European Championships
Bronze medal – third place	2002 Munich	Discus

Mediterranean Games
Gold medal – first place	1997 Bari	Discus

Anastasia "Tasoula" Kelesidou (Greek: Αναστασία Κελεσίδου, [anastaˈsia celeˈsiðu]; born 28 November 1972) is a Greek retired discus thrower best known for winning silver medals at the 2000 and 2004 Summer Olympics. During her career she set seven Greek records in discus throw, the best being 67.70 metres.

Her only international victory came at the 1997 Mediterranean Games.

== Personal life ==
She was born in Hamburg, West Germany. Her family hails from Strymonochori, Serres.

== Honours ==
Year	Competition	Venue	Position	Notes
Representing Greece
1994	European Championships	Helsinki, Finland	22nd (q)	54.08 m
1995	World Championships	Gothenburg, Sweden	11th	58.96 m
1996	Olympic Games	Atlanta, United States	18th (q)	59.60 m
1997	Mediterranean Games	Bari, Italy	1st	66.18 m CR
1997	World Championships	Athens, Greece	15th (q)	59.22 m
1998	European Championships	Budapest, Hungary	7th	62.95 m
1999	World Championships	Sevilla, Spain	2nd	66.05 m
2000	Summer Olympics	Sydney, Australia]	2nd	65.71 m
2001	World Championships	Edmonton, Canada	3rd	65.50 m
2002	European Championships	Munich, Germany	3rd	63.92 m
2003	World Championships	Paris, France	2nd	67.14 m SB
2004	Summer Olympics	Athens, Greece	2nd	66.68 m
