= Seilala Sua =

American discus thrower

Seilala Maria Sua (born 25 February 1978 in Fort Lauderdale, Florida) is a discus thrower from the United States. Her personal best throw is 65.90 metres, achieved in July 2000 in Sacramento, California.

She was inducted into the UCLA Athletics Hall of Fame in 2010.

== Coach ==
Seilala Sua-Zumbado was an assistant coach in charge of the throwers for the University of Hawaiʻi Hawaii Rainbow Wahine track and field program in 2011–2012. She also served as volunteer coach at her alma mater UCLA in 2005–2006 school year.

== Athletics career ==
As a professional, Sua-Zumbado was a member of two US Olympic Teams in the discus (2000 Sydney, 2004 Athens), four-time USA Track & Field (USATF) National Champion in the discus, one-time USATF National Champion in the shot put and a three-time World Championships competitor. She was ranked in the Top 10 nationally in the discus for eight consecutive years and had the No. 6 mark in the world in 2001. While competing in the shot put, Sua-Zumbado ranked in the Top 10 nationally for seven consecutive years.

== NCAA ==
Sua-Zumbado graduated from UCLA in 2001 with a degree in sociology and is the winningest athlete in NCAA track and field history. While at UCLA, Sua-Zumbado won seven NCAA championships and was a 14-time All-American, who competed in all four throwing events - shot put, discus, hammer and javelin. She still ranks in the UCLA's all-time Top 10 in each of those events.

In Pac-10 competition, Sua-Zumbado won six individual titles and was a two-time Pac-10 women's track and field Athlete of the Year. In NCAA Women's Division I Outdoor Track and Field Championships competition, she won four consecutive discus crowns and became only the second woman in NCAA history to win four straight individual titles in the same event. Her other titles include an Outdoor Championship in the shot put in 1999 and 2000, and an Indoor Championship in the shot put in 2000.

While at the University of California, Los Angeles, Sua was the second female athlete to win four successive NCAA Championship titles in the same event, the Discus Throw. She also added three NCAA Women's Division I Indoor Track and Field Championships titles in the Shot Put, one indoor and 2 outdoor crowns. The seven NCAA Division I individual titles were the most for a single female athlete in NCAA history.

== International competitions ==
Year	Competition	Venue	Position	Event	Notes
Representing the United States
1996	World Junior Championships	Sydney, Australia	8th	Shot put	15.04 m
1996	World Junior Championships	Sydney, Australia	2nd	Discus	56.32 m
1999	World Championships	Seville, Spain	6th	Discus	63.73 m
2000	Olympic Games	Sydney, Australia	10th	Discus	59.85 m
2001	World Championships	Edmonton, Canada	5th	Discus	63.74 m
2004	Olympic Games	Athens, Greece	—	Discus	NM
