= Natalya Sadova =

Russian discus thrower

Personal information
- Native name: Наталья Ивановна Садова
- Full name: Natalya Ivanovna Sadova
- Nationality: Russian
- Born: 15 July 1972 (age 54) Gorkiy, Russian SFSR, Soviet Union
- Height: 180 cm (5 ft 11 in)
- Weight: 95 kg (209 lb)

Sport
- Country: Soviet Union (1989–1991); Russia (1993–2010)
- Sport: Women's athletics
- Event: Discus throw

Achievements and titles
- Personal best: 70.02 m (1999)
Medal record
Women's athletics
Representing Russia
Olympic Games
Gold medal – first place	2004 Athens	Discus
Silver medal – second place	1996 Atlanta	Discus
World Championships
Silver medal – second place	2005 Helsinki	Discus
Bronze medal – third place	1997 Athens	Discus
Disqualified	2001 Edmonton	Discus
European Championships
Silver medal – second place	1998 Budapest	Discus
Goodwill Games
Gold medal – first place	1998 New York City	Discus
Silver medal – second place	2001 Brisbane	Discus
Universiade
Gold medal – first place	1995 Fukuoka	Discus
Gold medal – first place	1997 Catania	Discus
IAAF World Cup
Bronze medal – third place	2002 Madrid	Discus

Natalya Ivanovna Sadova (Russian: Наталья Ивановна Садова, née Koptyukh, born 15 July 1972 in Gorky) is a Russian discus thrower who has competed in many Olympic Games.

== Career ==
She won the gold medal at the 2004 Summer Olympics held in Athens in 2004, as well as bronze at the World Championship in 1997, a silver medal at the 1996 Summer Olympics in Atlanta, and placed fourth in 2000 Summer Olympics in Sydney. She also competed in the 2008 Summer Olympics in Beijing, immediately after serving a two-year ban for doping, but failed to advance to the final round.

She originally won the gold medal at the 2001 World Championships in Athletics, but lost it due to a positive drugs test for caffeine. She was later cleared and let off a suspension, but in May 2006 she tested positive for an anabolic steroid and accepted a ban.

Her best discus throw was 70.02 meters on 23 June 1999, at the Olympic meet in Thessaloniki, Greece.

== See also ==
- List of doping cases in athletics

Sporting positions
Preceded by Franka Dietzsch; Nicoleta Grasu; Suzy Powell-Roos	Women's Discus Best Year Performance; 1999; 2001; 2003	Succeeded by Nicoleta Grasu; Suzy Powell-Roos; Iryna Yatchenko
