= Olena Antonova =

Ukrainian discus thrower

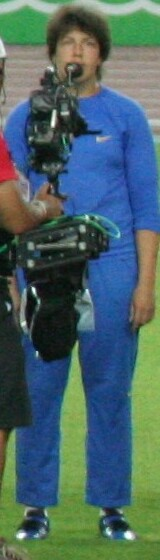

Personal information
- Full name: Olena Anatolyevna Antonova
- Nationality: Ukraine
- Born: 16 June 1972 (age 54) Nikopol, Dnipropetrovsk, Ukrainian SSR, Soviet Union
- Height: 1.80 m (5 ft 11 in)
- Weight: 95 kg (209 lb)

Sport
- Sport: Track and Field
- Event: Discus Throw
- Club: ZS-Ukraina Nikopol

Achievements and titles
- Personal best: 67.30 metres
Medal record
Women's athletics
Representing the Ukraine
Olympic Games
Silver medal – second place	2008 Beijing	Discus throw
European Throwing Cup
Silver medal – second place	2001 Nice	Discus throw

Olena Anatolyevna Antonova (Ukrainian: Олена Анатольевна Антонова; born 16 June 1972) is a Ukrainian former discus thrower. She was born in Nikopol.

== Career ==
Antonova's personal best throw is 67.30 metres, achieved in June 2004 in Kyiv. She won the bronze medal in Women's discus throw at the 2008 Summer Olympics in Beijing, upgraded to silver later.

Already in retirement, Antonova was suspended from competition for two years in July 2013, after a re-tested doping sample from the 2009 world championships proved positive for stanozolol.

== Achievements ==
Year	Tournament	Venue	Result	Extra
1991	European Junior Championships	Thessaloniki, Greece	3rd	54.30 m
1996	Olympic Games	Atlanta, United States	29th	57.92 m
1998	European Championships	Budapest, Hungary	11th	60.26 m
1999	World Championships	Seville, Spain	7th	63.61 m
2000	Olympic Games	Sydney, Australia	13th	60.73 m
2001	World Championships	Edmonton, Canada	16th	58.55 m
2003	World Championships	Paris, France	4th	65.90 m
2003	World Athletics Final	Monte Carlo, Monaco	4th	63.04 m
2004	Olympic Games	Athens, Greece	4th	65.75 m
2004	World Athletics Final	Monte Carlo, Monaco	4th	62.71 m
2005	World Championships	Helsinki, Finland	8th	59.37 m
2005	World Athletics Final	Monte Carlo, Monaco	7th	56.57 m
2007	World Championships	Osaka, Japan	5th	62.41 m
2008	Olympic Games	Beijing, PR China	2nd	62.59 m
