= Neelam Jaswant Singh =

Indian discus thrower (born 1971)

Medal record

Women's athletics

Representing India

Asian Games
Gold medal – first place	2002 Busan	Discus throw

Asian Championships
Gold medal – first place	2000 Jakarta	Discus throw
Silver medal – second place	1998 Fukuoka	Discus throw
Silver medal – second place	2003 Manila	Discus throw

Neelam Jaswant Singh (born 8 January 1971 in Farmana) is an Indian discus thrower.

Her personal best throw is 64.55 metres, achieved at the 2002 Asian Games in Busan.

In the year 1998, Neelam Jaswant Singh won the bronze medal at the Bangkok Asian Games. In the Kosanova International Athlete Meet held at Almaty (Kazakhstan), Neelam J. Singh has to her credit a gold medal performance. In August 2000, she also won a gold medal at the ATF that took place in Jakarta. But with a throw of 55.26 metres, she failed to make a mark in the Sydney Olympics. She has been married to her coach Jaswant Singh. Neelam is employed with the Railway Coach Factory in Kapurthala and was awarded by the Punjab Government in the year 1996. Recognizing her talent the Indian Government conferred her Arjuna Award in the year 1998.

== See also ==
- List of sportspeople sanctioned for doping offences
