= 1993 World Championships in Athletics – Women's discus throw =

These are the official results of the Women's Discus Throw event at the 1993 IAAF World Championships in Stuttgart, Germany. There were a total number of 34 participating athletes, with two qualifying groups and the final held on Thursday August 19, 1993. The qualification mark was set at 62.50 metres.

== Medalists ==
Gold	Olga Burova; Russia (RUS)
Silver	Daniela Costian; Australia (AUS)
Bronze	Min Chunfeng; PR China (CHN)

== Schedule ==
- All times are Central European Time (UTC+1)

Qualification Round
Group A	Group B
17.08.1993 – 10:00h	17.08.1993 – 11:30h
Final Round
19.08.1993 – 19:20h

== Abbreviations ==
- All results shown are in metres

Q	automatic qualification
q	qualification by rank
DNS	did not start
NM	no mark
WR	world record
AR	area record
NR	national record
PB	personal best
SB	season best

== Qualifying round ==
- Held on Tuesday 1993-08-17

RANK	GROUP A	DISTANCE
1.	Ilke Wyludda (GER)	64.06 m
2.	Min Chunfeng (CHN)	63.56 m
3.	Olga Burova (RUS)	63.44 m
4.	Daniela Costian (AUS)	62.52 m
5.	Nicoleta Grasu (ROM)	62.28 m
6.	Bárbara Hechavarría (CUB)	61.60 m
7.	Svetla Mitkova-Sınırtaş (BUL)	61.18 m
8.	Ellina Zvereva (BLR)	59.84 m
9.	Jacqueline Goormachtigh (NED)	58.74 m
10.	Mette Bergmann (NOR)	58.12 m
11.	Zdeňka Šilhavá (CZE)	57.16 m
12.	Jackie McKernan (GBR)	56.14 m
13.	Teresa Machado (POR)	56.02 m
14.	Ursula Weber (AUT)	55.48 m
15.	Carla Garrett (USA)	53.52 m
16.	Monia Kari (TUN)	51.26 m
17.	Aye Aye Nwe (MYA)	47.40 m

RANK	GROUP B	DISTANCE
1.	Maritza Martén (CUB)	63.66 m
2.	Anja Gündler (GER)	62.82 m
3.	Qiu Qiaoping (CHN)	62.32 m
4.	Franka Dietzsch (GER)	61.66 m
5.	Larisa Mikhalchenko (UKR)	61.56 m
6.	Vladimíra Malátová (CZE)	61.22 m
7.	Larisa Korotkevich (RUS)	61.12 m
8.	Renata Katewicz (POL)	60.66 m
9.	Austrute Mikelyte (LTU)	59.82 m
10.	Manuela Tirneci (ROM)	59.50 m
11.	Connie Price-Smith (USA)	59.16 m
12.	Agnese Maffeis (ITA)	57.06 m
13.	Kris Kuehl (USA)	56.66 m
14.	Alice Matejková (CZE)	53.86 m
15.	Danijela Čurović (IWP)	53.72 m
16.	Theresa Brick (CAN)	50.38 m
17.	Orepa Naseri (SAM)	26.30 m

== Final ==
Rank	Athlete	Attempts						Distance	Note
Rank	Athlete	1	2	3	4	5	6	Distance	Note
1st place, gold medalist(s)	Olga Burova (RUS)	63.28	67.40	65.80	67.06	65.00	X	67.40 m	SB
2nd place, silver medalist(s)	Daniela Costian (AUS)	63.90	64.78	64.66	65.36	65.12	X	65.36 m	SB
3rd place, bronze medalist(s)	Min Chunfeng (CHN)	62.16	61.88	65.26	61.92	X	64.10	65.26 m	SB
4	Maritza Martén (CUB)	X	60.98	63.34	63.38	64.62	64.42	64.62 m	SB
5	Anja Gündler (GER)	62.24	60.26	62.36	59.52	62.72	62.92	62.92 m	SB
6	Bárbara Hechavarría (CUB)	60.70	60.16	62.52	X	X	58.44	62.52 m	SB
7	Nicoleta Grasu (ROM)	X	56.78	62.10	X	61.26	59.52	62.10 m	
8	Franka Dietzsch (GER)	61.34	61.28	58.86	60.30	62.06	60.76	62.06 m	SB
9	Vladimíra Malátová (CZE)							61.10 m	
10	Larisa Mikhalchenko (UKR)							60.76 m	
11	Ilke Wyludda (GER)							60.42 m	
—	Qiu Qiaoping (CHN)	X	X	X				NM	

== See also ==
- 1990 Women's European Championships Discus Throw (Split)
- 1992 Women's Olympic Discus Throw (Barcelona)
- 1994 Women's European Championships Discus Throw (Helsinki)
