= 1995 World Championships in Athletics – Women's discus throw =

These are the official results of the Women's Discus Throw event at the 1995 IAAF World Championships in Gothenburg, Sweden. There were a total number of 33 participating athletes, with two qualifying groups and the final held on Saturday, August 12, 1995.

== Medalists ==
Gold	Ellina Zvereva; Belarus (BLR)
Silver	Ilke Wyludda; Germany (GER)
Bronze	Olga Chernyavskaya; Russia (RUS)

== Schedule ==
- All times are Central European Time (UTC+1)

Qualification Round
Group A	Group B
10.08.1995 – 09:30h	10.08.1995 – 11:30h
Final Round
12.08.1995 – 17:00h

== Abbreviations ==
- All results shown are in metres

Q	automatic qualification
q	qualification by rank
DNS	did not start
NM	no mark
WR	world record
AR	area record
NR	national record
PB	personal best
SB	season best

== Qualifying round ==
=== Group A ===
Rank	Overall	Athlete	Attempts			Distance	Note
Rank	Overall	Athlete	1	2	3	Distance	Note
1		Natalya Sadova (RUS)	63.64	—	—	63.64 m	
2		Ellina Zvereva (BLR)	62.44	—	—	62.44 m	
3		Daniela Costian (AUS)	61.42	X	60.50	61.42 m	
4		Lyudmila Filimonova (BLR)	X	61.18	X	61.18 m	
5		Bárbara Hechavarría (CUB)	57.54	57.24	60.48	60.48 m	
6		Franka Dietzsch (GER)	59.78	58.96	58.18	59.78 m	
7		Teresa Machado (POR)	X	54.60	58.68	58.68 m	
8		Nicoleta Grasu (ROM)	58.62	X	58.28	58.62 m	
9		Corrie de Bruin (NED)	57.64	X	58.14	58.14 m	
10		Zdeňka Šilhavá (CZE)	53.20	X	56.38	56.38 m	
11		Edie Boyer (USA)	52.08	55.14	X	55.14 m	
12		Danyel Mitchell (USA)	50.42	54.48	54.62	54.62 m	
13		Beatrice Faumuina (NZL)	50.50	53.40	54.32	54.32 m	
14		Styliani Tsikouna (GRE)	X	X	49.92	49.92 m	
15		Caroline Fournier (MRI)	44.52	41.96	45.18	45.18 m	
16		Eva Dimas (ESA)	39.96	41.78	41.78	41.78 m	

=== Group B ===
Rank	Overall	Athlete	Attempts			Distance	Note
Rank	Overall	Athlete	1	2	3	Distance	Note
1		Ilke Wyludda (GER)	60.30	65.24	—	65.24 m	
2		Mette Bergmann (NOR)	61.28	64.50	—	64.50 m	
3		Maritza Martén (CUB)	64.42	—	—	64.42 m	
4		Olga Chernyavskaya (RUS)	62.96	—	—	62.96 m	
5		Irina Yatchenko (BLR)	60.92	62.54	—	62.54 m	
6		Anastasia Kelesidou (GRE)	59.88	53.58	X	59.88 m	
7		Jana Lauren (GER)	59.56	57.88	58.90	59.56 m	
8		Lisa-Marie Vizaniari (AUS)	58.54	59.24	X	59.24 m	
9		Atanaska Angelova (BUL)	X	58.94	X	58.94 m	
10		Li Qiumei (CHN)	55.16	58.88	57.78	58.88 m	
11		Cristina Boit (ROM)	55.20	58.54	X	58.54 m	
12		Jacqueline Goormachtigh (NED)	55.54	X	57.82	57.82 m	
13		Melissa Weis (USA)	57.34	55.82	56.00	57.34 m	
14		Danijela Čurović (FR Yugoslavia)	56.26	53.76	56.88	56.88 m	
15		Jackie McKernan (GBR)	54.78	53.48	54.64	54.78 m	
16		Oumou Traoré (MLI)	36.46	35.54	28.64	36.46 m	
17		Rangi Ngaata (COK)	31.94	32.84	31.50	32.84 m	

== Final ==
Rank	Athlete	Attempts						Distance	Notes
Rank	Athlete	1	2	3	4	5	6	Distance	Notes
1st place, gold medalist(s)	Ellina Zvereva (BLR)	68.64	63.04	65.42	63.82	65.86	66.92	68.64 m	
2nd place, silver medalist(s)	Ilke Wyludda (GER)	64.00	66.02	66.60	65.48	67.20	67.00	67.20 m	
3rd place, bronze medalist(s)	Olga Chernyavskaya (RUS)	66.86	65.20	X	59.58	X	62.86	66.86 m	SB
4	Maritza Martén (CUB)	X	63.22	63.12	60.44	64.36	X	64.36 m	SB
5	Natalya Sadova (RUS)	59.64	62.60	59.42	60.62	59.58	X	62.60 m	
6	Mette Bergmann (NOR)	X	X	62.48	X	X	59.48	62.48 m	
7	Franka Dietzsch (GER)	61.28	60.72	58.60	X	X	X	61.28 m	
8	Lyudmila Filimonova (BLR)	54.32	59.26	61.16	58.94	X	X	61.16 m	
9	Irina Yatchenko (BLR)	X	58.72	60.48				60.48 m	
10	Bárbara Hechavarría (CUB)	58.98	56.18	56.24				58.98 m	
11	Anastasia Kelesidou (GRE)	58.96	58.14	55.06				58.96 m	
12	Daniela Costian (AUS)	X	X	56.46				56.46 m	

== See also ==
- 1994 Women's European Championships Discus Throw (Helsinki)
- 1996 Women's Olympic Discus Throw (Atlanta)
