= Discus throw at the World Athletics Championships =

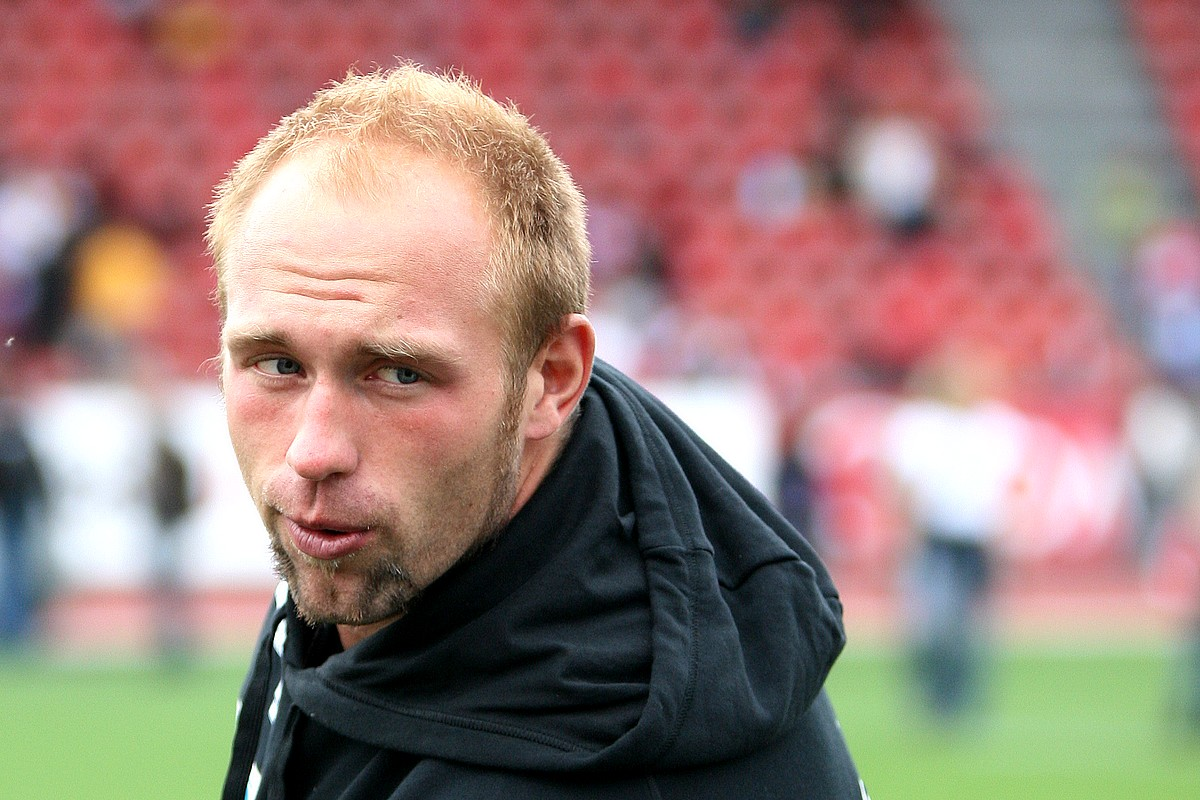
- Three-time men's discus throw champion Robert Harting

Overview
- Gender: Men and women
- Years held: Men: 1983 – 2025; Women: 1983 – 2025

Championship record
- Men: 71.46 m Daniel Ståhl (2023)
- Women: 71.62 m Martina Hellmann (1987)

Reigning champion
- Men: Daniel Ståhl (SWE)
- Women: Valarie Allman (USA)

The discus throw at the World Championships in Athletics has been contested by both men and women since the inaugural edition in 1983. The competition format typically has one qualifying round contested by two groups of athletes, with all those clearing the qualifying height or placing in top twelve overall advancing to the final round.

Germany is the most successful nation in the event, with a total of 22 medals, 11 of them gold. Additionally, East Germany won 4 medals (including 3 golds) between 1983 and 1987. Cuba is the second-most successful nation, with 9 medals total, 2 of them gold. 7 of these medals were won by women. They could be seen as a counterpart to Lithuania, as all of their 8 medals in the event were won by men.

Lars Riedel is the most successful athlete in the event, winning 5 gold medals and one bronze medal between 1991 and 2001. His 5 gold medals are the second-most for any athlete in a single individual event, a feat only bettered by Sergey Bubka in the pole vault. Franka Dietzsch is the most successful woman in the event, with three gold medals. Robert Harting is the only other athlete that has won more than two gold medals in the event. Sandra Perković is the most decorated female athlete, with 5 medals in total.

The championship records for the event are 71.46 m for men, set by Daniel Ståhl in 2023, and 71.62 m for women, set by Martina Hellmann in 1987.

The reigning world champions are Daniel Ståhl from Sweden and Laulauga Tausaga from the United States.

== Age records ==
- All information from World Athletics.

| Distinction | Male | | | Female | | |
| Distinction | Athlete | Age | Date | Athlete | Age | Date |
|---|---|---|---|---|---|---|
| Youngest champion | Kristjan Čeh (SLO) | 23 years, 152 days | 19 Jul 2022 | Dani Samuels (AUS) | 21 years, 87 days | 21 Aug 2009 |
| Youngest medalist | Mykolas Alekna (LIT) | 19 years, 304 days | 19 Jul 2022 | Dani Samuels (AUS) | 21 years, 87 days | 21 Aug 2009 |
| Youngest finalist | Mykolas Alekna (LIT) | 19 years, 304 days | 19 Jul 2022 | Ilke Wyludda (GDR) | 18 years, 156 days | 31 Aug 1987 |
| Youngest participant | Robert McNabb (COK) | 18 years, 232 days | 8 Aug 1997 | Siniva Marsters (COK) | 16 years, 304 days | 7 Aug 1997 |
| Oldest champion | Lars Riedel (GER) | 34 years, 41 days | 8 Aug 2001 | Ellina Zvereva (BLR) | 40 years, 268 days | 11 Aug 2001 |
| Oldest medalist | John Powell (USA) | 40 years, 71 days | 4 Sep 1987 | Ellina Zvereva (BLR) | 40 years, 268 days | 11 Aug 2001 |
| Oldest finalist | John Powell (USA) | 40 years, 71 days | 4 Sep 1987 | Mélina Robert-Michon (FRA) | 44 years, 35 days | 22 Aug 2023 |
| Oldest participant | Virgilijus Alekna (LIT) | 41 years, 180 days | 12 Aug 2013 | Ellina Zvereva (BLR) | 48 years, 276 days | 19 Aug 2009 |

== Medalists ==
=== Men ===
| Championships | Gold | Silver | Bronze |
|---|---|---|---|
| 1983 Helsinki | Imrich Bugár (TCH) | Luis Delís (CUB) | Géjza Valent (TCH) |
| 1987 Rome | Jürgen Schult (GDR) | John Powell (USA) | Luis Delís (CUB) |
| 1991 Tokyo | Lars Riedel (GER) | Erik de Bruin (NED) | Attila Horváth (HUN) |
| 1993 Stuttgart | Lars Riedel (GER) | Dmitry Shevchenko (RUS) | Jürgen Schult (GER) |
| 1995 Gothenburg | Lars Riedel (GER) | Vladimir Dubrovshchik (BLR) | Vasiliy Kaptyukh (BLR) |
| 1997 Athens | Lars Riedel (GER) | Virgilijus Alekna (LTU) | Jürgen Schult (GER) |
| 1999 Seville | Anthony Washington (discus thrower) (USA) | Jürgen Schult (GER) | Lars Riedel (GER) |
| 2001 Edmonton | Lars Riedel (GER) | Virgilijus Alekna (LTU) | Michael Möllenbeck (GER) |
| 2003 Saint-Denis | Virgilijus Alekna (LTU) | Róbert Fazekas (HUN) | Vasiliy Kaptyukh (BLR) |
| 2005 Helsinki | Virgilijus Alekna (LTU) | Gerd Kanter (EST) | Michael Möllenbeck (GER) |
| 2007 Osaka | Gerd Kanter (EST) | Robert Harting (GER) | Rutger Smith (NED) |
| 2009 Berlin | Robert Harting (GER) | Piotr Małachowski (POL) | Gerd Kanter (EST) |
| 2011 Daegu | Robert Harting (GER) | Gerd Kanter (EST) | Ehsan Haddadi (IRI) |
| 2013 Moscow | Robert Harting (GER) | Piotr Małachowski (POL) | Gerd Kanter (EST) |
| 2015 Beijing | Piotr Małachowski (POL) | Philip Milanov (BEL) | Robert Urbanek (POL) |
| 2017 London | Andrius Gudžius (LTU) | Daniel Ståhl (SWE) | Mason Finley (USA) |
| 2019 Doha | Daniel Ståhl (SWE) | Fedrick Dacres (JAM) | Lukas Weißhaidinger (AUT) |
| 2022 Eugene | Kristjan Čeh (SLO) | Mykolas Alekna (LTU) | Andrius Gudžius (LTU) |
| 2023 Budapest | Daniel Ståhl (SWE) | Kristjan Čeh (SLO) | Mykolas Alekna (LTU) |
| 2025 Tokyo | Daniel Ståhl (SWE) | Mykolas Alekna (LTU) | Alex Rose (SAM) |

==== Multiple medalists ====
| Rank | Athlete | Nation | Period | Gold | Silver | Bronze | Total |
|---|---|---|---|---|---|---|---|
| 1 | Lars Riedel | Germany (GER) | 1991–2001 | 5 | 0 | 1 | 6 |
| 2 | Robert Harting | Germany (GER) | 2007–2013 | 3 | 1 | 0 | 4 |
| 2 | Daniel Ståhl | Sweden (SWE) | 2017–2025 | 3 | 1 | 0 | 4 |
| 4 | Virgilijus Alekna | Lithuania (LTU) | 1997–2005 | 2 | 2 | 0 | 4 |
| 5 | Gerd Kanter | Estonia (EST) | 2005–2013 | 1 | 2 | 2 | 5 |
| 6 | Piotr Małachowski | Poland (POL) | 2009–2015 | 1 | 2 | 0 | 3 |
| 7 | Jürgen Schult | Germany (GER) | 1987–1997 | 1 | 1 | 2 | 4 |
| 8 | Kristjan Čeh | Slovenia (SLO) | 2022-2023 | 1 | 1 | 0 | 2 |
| 9 | Andrius Gudžius | Lithuania (LTU) | 2017-2022 | 1 | 0 | 1 | 2 |
| 10 | Mykolas Alekna | Lithuania (LTU) | 2022-2025 | 0 | 2 | 1 | 3 |
| 11 | Luis Delís | Cuba (CUB) | 1983–1987 | 0 | 1 | 1 | 2 |
| 12 | Vasiliy Kaptyukh | Belarus (BLR) | 1995–2003 | 0 | 0 | 2 | 2 |
| 12 | Michael Möllenbeck | Germany (GER) | 2001–2005 | 0 | 0 | 2 | 2 |

==== Medals by country ====
| Rank | Nation | Gold | Silver | Bronze | Total |
|---|---|---|---|---|---|
| 1 | Germany (GER) | 8 | 2 | 5 | 15 |
| 2 | Lithuania (LTU) | 3 | 4 | 2 | 9 |
| 3 | Sweden (SWE) | 3 | 1 | 0 | 4 |
| 4 | Estonia (EST) | 1 | 2 | 2 | 5 |
| 5 | Poland (POL) | 1 | 2 | 1 | 4 |
| 6 | United States (USA) | 1 | 1 | 1 | 3 |
| 7 | Slovenia (SLO) | 1 | 1 | 0 | 2 |
| 8 | Czechoslovakia (TCH) | 1 | 0 | 1 | 2 |
| 9 | East Germany (GDR) | 1 | 0 | 0 | 1 |
| 10 | Belarus (BLR) | 0 | 1 | 2 | 3 |
| 11 | Cuba (CUB) | 0 | 1 | 1 | 2 |
| 11 | Hungary (HUN) | 0 | 1 | 1 | 2 |
| 11 | Netherlands (NED) | 0 | 1 | 1 | 2 |
| 12 | Belgium (BEL) | 0 | 1 | 0 | 1 |
| 12 | Iran (IRI) | 0 | 1 | 0 | 1 |
| 12 | Jamaica (JAM) | 0 | 1 | 0 | 1 |
| 12 | Russia (RUS) | 0 | 1 | 0 | 1 |
| 13 | Austria (AUT) | 0 | 0 | 1 | 1 |
| 13 | Samoa (SAM) | 0 | 0 | 1 | 1 |

=== Women ===
| Championships | Gold | Silver | Bronze |
|---|---|---|---|
| 1983 Helsinki | Martina Opitz (GDR) | Galina Murašova (URS) | Mariya Petkova (BUL) |
| 1987 Rome | Martina Hellmann (GDR) | Diana Gansky (GDR) | Tsvetanka Khristova (BUL) |
| 1991 Tokyo | Tsvetanka Khristova (BUL) | Ilke Wyludda (GER) | Larisa Mikhalchenko (URS) |
| 1993 Stuttgart | Olga Chernyavskaya (RUS) | Daniela Costian (AUS) | Min Chunfeng (CHN) |
| 1995 Gothenburg | Ellina Zvereva (BLR) | Ilke Wyludda (GER) | Olga Chernyavskaya (RUS) |
| 1997 Athens | Beatrice Faumuina (NZL) | Ellina Zvereva (BLR) | Natalya Sadova (RUS) |
| 1999 Seville | Franka Dietzsch (GER) | Anastasia Kelesidou (GRE) | Nicoleta Grasu (ROU) |
| 2001 Edmonton | Ellina Zvereva (BLR) | Nicoleta Grasu (ROU) | Anastasia Kelesidou (GRE) |
| 2003 Saint-Denis | Iryna Yatchenko (BLR) | Anastasia Kelesidou (GRE) | Ekaterini Voggoli (GRE) |
| 2005 Helsinki | Franka Dietzsch (GER) | Natalya Sadova (RUS) | Věra Pospíšilová-Cechlová (CZE) |
| 2007 Osaka | Franka Dietzsch (GER) | Yarelis Barrios (CUB) | Nicoleta Grasu (ROU) |
| 2009 Berlin | Dani Samuels (AUS) | Yarelis Barrios (CUB) | Nicoleta Grasu (ROU) |
| 2011 Daegu | Li Yanfeng (CHN) | Nadine Müller (GER) | Yarelis Barrios (CUB) |
| 2013 Moscow | Sandra Perković (CRO) | Mélina Robert-Michon (FRA) | Yarelis Barrios (CUB) |
| 2015 Beijing | Denia Caballero (CUB) | Sandra Perković (CRO) | Nadine Müller (GER) |
| 2017 London | Sandra Perković (CRO) | Dani Stevens (AUS) | Mélina Robert-Michon (FRA) |
| 2019 Doha | Yaime Pérez (CUB) | Denia Caballero (CUB) | Sandra Perković (CRO) |
| 2022 Eugene | Feng Bin (CHN) | Sandra Perković (CRO) | Valarie Allman (USA) |
| 2023 Budapest | Laulauga Tausaga (USA) | Valarie Allman (USA) | Feng Bin (CHN) |
| 2025 Tokyo | Valarie Allman (USA) | Jorinde van Klinken (NED) | Silinda Morales (CUB) |

==== Multiple medalists ====
| Rank | Athlete | Nation | Period | Gold | Silver | Bronze | Total |
|---|---|---|---|---|---|---|---|
| 1 | Franka Dietzsch | Germany (GER) | 1999–2007 | 3 | 0 | 0 | 3 |
| 2 | Sandra Perković | Croatia (CRO) | 2013–2022 | 2 | 2 | 1 | 5 |
| 3 | Ellina Zvereva | Belarus (BLR) | 1995–2001 | 2 | 1 | 0 | 3 |
| 4 | Martina Hellmann | East Germany (GDR) | 1983–1987 | 2 | 0 | 0 | 2 |
| 5 | Valarie Allman | United States (USA) | 2022-2025 | 1 | 1 | 1 | 3 |
| 6 | Dani Stevens | Australia (AUS) | 2009-2017 | 1 | 1 | 0 | 2 |
| 6 | Denia Caballero | Cuba (CUB) | 2015-2019 | 1 | 1 | 0 | 2 |
| 8 | Tsvetanka Khristova | Bulgaria (BUL) | 1987–1991 | 1 | 0 | 1 | 2 |
| 8 | Olga Chernyavskaya | Russia (RUS) | 1993–1995 | 1 | 0 | 1 | 2 |
| 8 | Feng Bin | China (CHN) | 2022-2023 | 1 | 0 | 1 | 2 |
| 11 | Yarelis Barrios | Cuba (CUB) | 2007–2013 | 0 | 2 | 2 | 4 |
| 12 | Anastasia Kelesidou | Greece (GRE) | 1999–2003 | 0 | 2 | 1 | 3 |
| 13 | Ilke Wyludda | Germany (GER) | 1991–1995 | 0 | 2 | 0 | 2 |
| 14 | Nicoleta Grasu | Romania (ROU) | 1999–2009 | 0 | 1 | 3 | 4 |
| 15 | Natalya Sadova | Russia (RUS) | 1997–2005 | 0 | 1 | 1 | 2 |
| 15 | Nadine Müller | Germany (GER) | 2011–2015 | 0 | 1 | 1 | 2 |
| 15 | Mélina Robert-Michon | France (FRA) | 2013-2017 | 0 | 1 | 1 | 2 |

==== Medals by country ====
| Rank | Nation | Gold | Silver | Bronze | Total |
|---|---|---|---|---|---|
| 1 | Germany (GER) | 3 | 3 | 1 | 7 |
| 2 | Belarus (BLR) | 3 | 1 | 0 | 4 |
| 3 | Cuba (CUB) | 2 | 3 | 3 | 8 |
| 4 | Croatia (CRO) | 2 | 2 | 1 | 5 |
| 5 | United States (USA) | 2 | 1 | 1 | 4 |
| 6 | East Germany (GDR) | 2 | 1 | 0 | 3 |
| 7 | China (CHN) | 2 | 0 | 2 | 4 |
| 8 | Australia (AUS) | 1 | 2 | 0 | 3 |
| 9 | Russia (RUS) | 1 | 1 | 2 | 4 |
| 10 | Bulgaria (BUL) | 1 | 0 | 2 | 3 |
| 11 | New Zealand (NZL) | 1 | 0 | 0 | 1 |
| 12 | Greece (GRE) | 0 | 2 | 2 | 4 |
| 13 | Romania (ROU) | 0 | 1 | 3 | 4 |
| 14 | France (FRA) | 0 | 1 | 1 | 2 |
| 15 | Soviet Union (URS) | 0 | 1 | 1 | 2 |
| 16 | Netherlands (NED) | 0 | 1 | 0 | 1 |
| 17 | Czech Republic (CZE) | 0 | 0 | 1 | 1 |

== Championship record progression ==
=== Men ===
Men's discus throw World Championships record progression
| Time | Athlete | Nation | Year | Round | Date |
|---|---|---|---|---|---|
| 64.20 m | Lius Delís | Cuba (CUB) | 1983 | Qualification | 1983-08-13 |
| 65.00 m | Imrich Bugar | Czechoslovakia (TCH) | 1983 | Qualification | 1983-08-13 |
| 67.48 m | Imrich Bugar | Czechoslovakia (TCH) | 1983 | Final | 1983-08-14 |
| 67.72 m | Imrich Bugar | Czechoslovakia (TCH) | 1983 | Final | 1983-08-14 |
| 68.74 m | Jürgen Schult | East Germany (GDR) | 1987 | Final | 1987-09-04 |
| 68.76 m | Lars Riedel | Germany (GER) | 1995 | Final | 1995-08-11 |
| 69.08 m | Anthony Washington | United States (USA) | 1999 | Final | 1999-08-24 |
| 69.72 m | Lars Riedel | Germany (GER) | 2001 | Final | 2001-08-08 |
| 70.17 m | Virgilijus Alekna | Lithuania (LTU) | 2005 | Final | 2005-08-07 |
| 71.13 m | Kristjan Čeh | Slovenia (SLO) | 2022 | Final | 2022-07-19 |
| 71.46 m | Daniel Ståhl | Sweden (SWE) | 2023 | Final | 2023-08-21 |

=== Women ===
Women's discus throw World Championships record progression
| Time | Athlete | Nation | Year | Round | Date |
|---|---|---|---|---|---|
| 65.84 m | Maria Petkova | Bulgaria (BUL) | 1983 | Qualification | 1983-08-09 |
| 66.42 m | Martina Hellmann | East Germany (GDR) | 1983 | Final | 1983-08-10 |
| 66.44 m | Maria Petkova | Bulgaria (BUL) | 1983 | Final | 1983-08-10 |
| 67.76 m | Martina Hellmann | East Germany (GDR) | 1983 | Final | 1983-08-10 |
| 68.74 m | Martina Hellmann | East Germany (GDR) | 1983 | Final | 1983-08-10 |
| 71.62 m | Martina Hellmann | East Germany (GDR) | 1987 | Final | 1987-08-31 |

== Best performances ==
=== Top ten furthest World Championship throws^{1} ===
Furthest men's throws at the World Championships
| Rank | Distance (m) | Athlete | Nation | Year | Date |
|---|---|---|---|---|---|
| 1 | 71.46 m | Daniel Ståhl | Sweden | 2023 | 2023-08-21 |
| 2 | 71.11 m | Kristjan Čeh | Slovenia | 2022 | 2022-07-19 |
| 3 | 70.47 m | Daniel Ståhl | Sweden | 2025 | 2025-09-21 |
| 4 | 70.17 m | Virgilijus Alekna | Lithuania | 2005 | 2005-08-07 |
| 5 | 70.02 m | Kristjan Čeh | Slovenia | 2023 | 2023-08-21 |
| 6 | 69.90 m | Daniel Ståhl | Sweden | 2025^{Q} | 2025-09-20 |
| 7 | 69.72 m | Lars Riedel | Germany | 2001 | 2001-08-07 |
| 8 | 69.69 m | Virgilijus Alekna | Lithuania | 2003 | 2003-08-26 |
| 9 | 69.41 m | Robert Harting | Germany | 2009 | 2009-08-19 |
| 10 | 69.40 m | Virgilijus Alekna | Lithuania | 2001 | 2001-08-07 |

Furthest women's throws at the World Championships
| Rank | Distance (m) | Athlete | Nation | Year | Date |
|---|---|---|---|---|---|
| 1 | 71.62 m | Martina Hellmann | East Germany | 1987 | 1987-08-31 |
| 2 | 71.02 m | Tsvetanka Khristova | Bulgaria | 1991 | 1991-08-31 |
| 3 | 70.31 m | Sandra Perković | Croatia | 2017 | 2017-08-13 |
| 4 | 70.12 m | Diana Gansky | East Germany | 1987 | 1987-08-31 |
| 5 | 69.67 m | Sandra Perković | Croatia | 2017^{Q} | 2017-08-11 |
| 6 | 69.64 m | Dani Stevens | Australia | 2017 | 2017-08-13 |
| 7 | 69.49 m | Laulauga Tausaga | United States | 2023 | 2023-08-22 |
| 8 | 69.48 m | Valarie Allman | United States | 2025 | 2025-09-14 |
| 9 | 69.28 m | Denia Caballero | Cuba | 2015 | 2015-08-25 |
| 10 | 69.23 m | Valarie Allman | United States | 2023 | 2023-08-22 |

^{1}Does not include ancillary marks.

== See also ==
- Discus throw
- Discus throw at the Olympics

== Bibliography ==
- Butler, Mark (2023). World Athletics Championships Budapest 2023 Statistics Book. World Athletics.
