= 1998 European Athletics Championships – Women's discus throw =

Women's discus throw at the European Athletics Championships

The women's discus throw at the 1998 European Athletics Championships was held at the Népstadion on 19 and 21 August.

== Medalists ==
Gold	Franka Dietzsch; Germany
Silver	Natalya Sadova; Russia
Bronze	Nicoleta Grasu; Romania

== Results ==
KEY:	q	Better non-qualifiers	Q	Qualified	NR	National record	PB	Personal best	SB	Seasonal best

=== Qualification ===
Qualification: Qualification Performance 63.85 (Q) or at least 12 best performers advance to the final.

Rank	Group	Athlete	Nationality	#1	#2	#3	Result	Notes
1	A	Ellina Zvereva	Belarus				66.55	Q
2	B	Franka Dietzsch	Germany				65.61	Q
3	A	Nicoleta Grasu	Romania				64.25	Q
4	A	Ilke Wyludda	Germany				62.97	q
5	B	Natalya Sadova	Russia				62.94	q
6	B	Anja Möllenbeck	Germany				62.48	q
7	B	Ekaterini Voggoli	Greece				62.33	q
8	B	Olena Antonova	Ukraine				62.17	q
9	B	Teresa Machado	Portugal				61.70	q
10	A	Iryna Yatchenko	Belarus				61.55	q
10	A	Anastasia Kelesidou	Greece				61.55	q
12	A	Styliani Tsikouna	Greece				61.46	q
13	B	Marzena Zbrojewska	Poland				60.70	
14	A	Valentina Ivanova	Russia				59.67	
15	A	Anna Söderberg	Sweden				59.57	
16	A	Jacqueline Goormachtigh	Netherlands				59.52	
17	B	Manuela Tirneci	Romania				59.42	
18	B	Zdeňka Šilhavá	Czech Republic				58.39	
19	A	Eha Rünne	Estonia				58.28	
20	B	Tiina Kankaanpää	Finland				58.22	
21	B	Lyudmila Filimonova	Belarus				57.41	
22	A	Katarzyna Żakowicz	Poland				56.99	
23	B	Renata Gustaitytė	Lithuania				55.37	
24	A	Agnese Maffeis	Italy				55.08	
25	A	Danijela Curović	Yugoslavia				54.57	
26	A	Oksana Mert	Turkey				53.77	
27	B	Shelley Drew	Great Britain				53.13	
28	B	Hüsniye Keskin	Turkey				51.55	
29	A	Mélina Robert-Michon	France				47.88	

=== Final ===
Rank	Athlete	Nationality	#1	#2	#3	#4	#5	#6	Result	Notes
1st place, gold medalist(s)	Franka Dietzsch	Germany	65.91	65.83	64.84	x	65.66	67.49	67.49	SB
2nd place, silver medalist(s)	Natalya Sadova	Russia	63.08	x	64.81	62.69	x	66.94	66.94	
3rd place, bronze medalist(s)	Nicoleta Grasu	Romania	65.94	62.45	62.75	62.88	64.08	65.70	65.94	
4	Ellina Zvereva	Belarus	61.78	64.59	64.15	65.92	63.29	63.85	65.92	
5	Ekaterini Voggoli	Greece	61.16	x	59.62	59.51	63.56	x	63.56	
6	Ilke Wyludda	Germany	61.38	63.46	61.59	61.71	x	61.72	63.46	
7	Anastasia Kelesidou	Greece	61.11	x	56.78	x	x	62.95	62.95	
8	Iryna Yatchenko	Belarus	59.57	61.01	x	61.20	x	x	61.20	
9	Teresa Machado	Portugal	60.90	x	60.59				60.90	
10	Anja Möllenbeck	Germany	60.35	60.78	x				60.78	
11	Olena Antonova	Ukraine	55.66	60.26	x				60.26	
12	Styliani Tsikouna	Greece	54.99	x	57.07				57.07	
