= 1991 World Championships in Athletics – Women's discus throw =

These are the official results of the Women's Discus Throw event at the 1991 IAAF World Championships in Tokyo, Japan. There were a total of 31 participating athletes, with two qualifying groups and the final held on Saturday August 31, 1991.

== Medalists ==
Gold	Tsvetanka Khristova; Bulgaria (BUL)
Silver	Ilke Wyludda; Germany (GER)
Bronze	Larisa Mikhalchenko; Soviet Union (URS)

== Schedule ==
- All times are Japan Standard Time (UTC+9)

Qualification Round
Group A	Group B
29.08.1991 – 19:00h	29.08.1991 – 19:00h
Final Round
31.08.1991 – 18:10h

== Abbreviations ==
- All results shown are in metres

Q	automatic qualification
q	qualification by rank
DNS	did not start
NM	no mark
WR	world record
AR	area record
NR	national record
PB	personal best
SB	season best

== Qualifying round ==
- Held on Thursday 1991-08-29

RANK	GROUP A	DISTANCE
1.	Ilke Wyludda (GER)	67.72 m
2.	Daniela Costian (AUS)	62.74 m
3.	Maritza Martén (CUB)	60.88 m
4.	Iryna Yatchenko (URS)	60.38 m
5.	Zhao Yonghua (CHN)	59.80 m
6.	Franka Dietzsch (GER)	59.16 m
7.	Stefania Simova (BUL)	58.10 m
8.	Lacy Barnes-Mileham (USA)	56.84 m
9.	Agnese Maffeis (ITA)	56.36 m
10.	Mette Bergmann (NOR)	55.78 m
11.	Teresa Machado (POR)	53.64 m
12.	Alice Matějková (TCH)	53.22 m
13.	Ikuko Kitamori (JPN)	48.52 m
14.	María Lourdes Ruiz (NCA)	41.78 m
—	Hanane Khaled (EGY)	DNS

RANK	GROUP B	DISTANCE
1.	Tsvetanka Khristova (BUL)	67.10 m
2.	Martina Hellmann (GER)	65.26 m
3.	Larisa Mikhalchenko (URS)	64.68 m
4.	Ellina Zvereva (URS)	61.86 m
5.	Xiao Yanling (CHN)	61.68 m
6.	Bárbara Hechavarría (CUB)	60.86 m
7.	Min Chunfeng (CHN)	59.42 m
8.	Vladimíra Malátová (TCH)	58.38 m
9.	Marie-Paule Geldhof (BEL)	57.26 m
10.	Carla Garrett (USA)	56.62 m
11.	Jackie McKernan (GBR)	55.64 m
12.	Manuela Tirneci (ROM)	55.62 m
13.	Penny Neer (USA)	54.26 m
14.	Angeles Barreiro (ESP)	51.24 m
15.	Wilna Bredenhann (NAM)	43.60 m
16.	Hughette Robertson (GUY)	34.52 m

== Final ==
Rank	Athlete	Attempts						Distance	Note
Rank	Athlete	1	2	3	4	5	6	Distance	Note
1st place, gold medalist(s)	Tsvetanka Khristova (BUL)	62.16	64.20	62.82	X	66.96	71.02	71.02 m	SB
2nd place, silver medalist(s)	Ilke Wyludda (GER)	67.10	68.78	66.34	69.00	69.12	X	69.12 m	SB
3rd place, bronze medalist(s)	Larisa Mikhalchenko (URS)	66.20	67.30	67.46	67.12	67.96	68.26	68.26 m	
4	Martina Hellmann (GER)	65.32	66.28	67.14	65.80	X	66.56	67.14 m	SB
5	Daniela Costian (AUS)	64.32	X	65.56	X	66.06	X	66.06 m	AR
6	Min Chunfeng (CHN)	63.76	64.70	62.32	65.56	63.88	64.30	65.56 m	
7	Iryna Yatchenko (URS)	63.84	63.86	X	64.92	60.76	62.24	64.92 m	SB
8	Zhao Yonghua (CHN)	60.94	63.62	61.28	X	60.84	X	63.62 m	PB
9	Ellina Zvereva (URS)							63.22 m	
10	Maritza Martén (CUB)							62.40 m	
11	Xiao Yanling (CHN)							61.20 m	
12	Bárbara Hechavarría (CUB)							60.62 m	

== See also ==
- 1988 Women's Olympic Discus Throw (Seoul)
- 1990 Women's European Championships Discus Throw (Split)
- 1992 Women's Olympic Discus Throw (Barcelona)
- 1994 Women's European Championships Discus Throw (Helsinki)
