= Athletics at the 1989 Summer Universiade – Women's discus throw =

The women's discus throw event at the 1989 Summer Universiade was held at the Wedaustadion in Duisburg on 27 and 28 August 1989.

The winning margin was 12 cm which as of 2024 remains the narrowest winning margin for the women's discus throw at these games.

== Medalists ==
Gold	Silver	Bronze
Hou Xuemei; China	Gabriele Reinsch; East Germany	Maritza Martén; Cuba

== Results ==
=== Qualification ===
Rank	Athlete	Nationality	Result	Notes
1	Franka Dietzsch	East Germany	61.70	Q
2	Olga Davydova	Soviet Union	61.00	Q
3	Gabriele Reinsch	East Germany	60.96	Q
4	Antonina Patoka	Soviet Union	60.94	Q
5	Hou Xuemei	China	59.74	Q
6	Maritza Martén	Cuba	59.38	Q
7	Tsvetanka Khristova	Bulgaria	58.22	Q
8	Ursula Kreutel	West Germany	57.46	Q
9	Ingrid Belz	West Germany	55.00	Q
10	Renata Katewicz	Poland	54.60	Q
11	Leonora Barnes	United States	54.34	Q
12	Bárbara Hechavarría	Cuba	53.28	Q
13	Maria Marello	Italy	53.28	Q
14	Mei Dai	China	52.98	Q
15	Lidia Rognini	Italy	52.48	Q
16	Michelle Brotherton	Canada	47.86	
17	Isabelle Devaluez	France	47.52	
18	Anne Otutu	Nigeria	39.32	
19	Jotsna Afrose	Bangladesh	31.18	

=== Final ===
Rank	Athlete	Nationality	Result	Notes
1st place, gold medalist(s)	Hou Xuemei	China	65.32	
2nd place, silver medalist(s)	Gabriele Reinsch	East Germany	65.20	
3rd place, bronze medalist(s)	Maritza Martén	Cuba	64.70	
4	Franka Dietzsch	East Germany	63.96	
5	Tsvetanka Khristova	Bulgaria	61.72	
6	Olga Davydova	Soviet Union	61.48	
7	Antonina Patoka	Soviet Union	60.62	
8	Ursula Kreutel	West Germany	58.65	
9	Bárbara Hechavarría	Cuba	56.79	
10	Ingrid Belz	West Germany	55.83	
11	Leonora Barnes	United States	54.46	
12	Mei Dai	China	54.20	
13	Renata Katewicz	Poland	54.10	
14	Maria Marello	Italy	53.06	
15	Lidia Rognini	Italy	52.88	
