= 1994 European Athletics Championships – Women's discus throw =

Women's discus throw at the European Athletics Championships

These are the official results of the Women's discus throw event at the 1994 European Championships in Helsinki, Finland, held at Helsinki Olympic Stadium on 9 and 10 August 1994. There were a total number of 24 participating athletes.

== Medalists ==
Gold	Ilke Wyludda; Germany
Silver	Ellina Zvereva; Belarus
Bronze	Mette Bergmann; Norway

== Final ==
- Held on 10 August 1994

Rank	Final	Distance
	Ilke Wyludda (GER)	68.72 m
	Ellina Zvereva (BLR)	64.46 m
	Mette Bergmann (NOR)	64.34 m
4.	Nicoleta Grasu (ROM)	63.64 m
5.	Olga Chernyavskaya (RUS)	62.54 m
6.	Jana Lauren (GER)	60.44 m
7.	Marie-Paule Geldhof (BEL)	59.48 m
8.	Lyudmila Filimonova (BLR)	59.46 m
9.	Franka Dietzsch (GER)	59.18 m
10.	Olga Nikishina (UKR)	58.36 m
11.	Natalya Sadova (RUS)	58.08 m
12.	Zdeňka Šilhavá (TCH)	55.04 m

== Qualification ==
- Held on 9 August 1994

Rank	Group A	Distance
1.	Ellina Zvereva (BLR)	62.50 m
2.	Franka Dietzsch (GER)	59.98 m
3.	Jana Lauren (GER)	58.20 m
4.	Olga Chernyavskaya (RUS)	57.62 m
5.	Nicoleta Grasu (ROM)	57.58 m
6.	Eha Rünne (EST)	56.50 m
7.	Renata Katewicz (POL)	56.32 m
8.	Svetla Mitkova (BUL)	56.04 m
9.	Jacqueline Goormachtigh (NED)	54.82 m
10.	Alice Matejková (TCH)	54.14 m
11.	Anastasia Kelesidou (GRE)	54.08 m
12.	Karin Colberg (SWE)	53.36 m

Rank	Group B	Distance
1.	Ilke Wyludda (GER)	65.90 m
2.	Mette Bergmann (NOR)	63.32 m
3.	Olga Nikishina (UKR)	59.89 m
4.	Natalya Sadova (RUS)	59.76 m
5.	Marie-Paule Geldhof (BEL)	59.20 m
6.	Lyudmila Filimonova (BLR)	58.50 m
7.	Zdeňka Šilhavá (TCH)	58.00 m
8.	Jackie McKernan (GBR)	57.56 m
9.	Daniela Čurović (Independent European Participants)	57.06 m
10.	Atanaska Angelova (BUL)	56.26 m
11.	Corrie de Bruin (NED)	54.76 m
12.	Agnès Teppe (FRA)	51.98 m

== Participation ==
According to an unofficial count, 24 athletes from 17 countries participated in the event.

- Belarus (2)
- Belgium (1)
- Bulgaria (2)
- Czech Republic (2)
- Estonia (1)
- France (1)
- Germany (3)
- Greece (1)
- Independent European Participants (1)
- Netherlands (2)
- Norway (1)
- Poland (1)
- Romania (1)
- Russia (2)
- Sweden (1)
- Ukraine (1)
- United Kingdom (1)

== See also ==
- 1990 Women's European Championships Discus Throw (Split)
- 1992 Women's Olympic Discus Throw (Barcelona)
- 1993 Women's World Championships Discus Throw (Stuttgart)
- 1995 Women's World Championships Discus Throw (Gothenburg)
- 1996 Women's Olympic Discus Throw (Atlanta)
- 1997 Women's World Championships Discus Throw (Athens)
- 1998 Women's European Championships Discus Throw (Budapest)
