= Athletics at the 1992 Summer Olympics – Women's discus throw =

Women's discus throw at the Games of the XXV Olympiad
- Venues: Estadi Olímpic de Montjuïc
- Dates: August 1, 1992 (qualifications); August 3, 1992 (finals)
- Competitors: 28 from 16 nations
- Winning distance: 70.06

Medalists
1st place, gold medalist(s)		Maritza Martén; Cuba
2nd place, silver medalist(s)		Tsvetanka Khristova; Bulgaria
3rd place, bronze medalist(s)		Daniela Costian; Australia

These are the official results of the women's discus throw event at the 1992 Summer Olympics in Barcelona, Spain.

== Medalists ==
Gold	Maritza Martén; Cuba
Silver	Tsvetanka Khristova; Bulgaria
Bronze	Daniela Costian; Australia

== Records ==
These were the standing world and Olympic records (in metres) prior to the 1992 Summer Olympics.

World record	76.80	(East Germany) Gabriele Reinsch	Neubrandenburg (GDR)	July 9, 1988
Olympic record	72.30	(East Germany) Martina Hellmann	Seoul (KOR)	September 29, 1988

== Qualification ==
RANK	GROUP A	DISTANCE
1.	Larisa Korotkevich (EUN)	67.92 m
2.	Maritza Martén (CUB)	65.02 m
3.	Daniela Costian (AUS)	64.10 m
4.	Tsvetanka Khristova (BUL)	64.06 m
5.	Nicoleta Grădinaru (ROU)	60.62 m
6.	Martina Hellmann (GER)	60.52 m
7.	Bárbara Hechavarría (CUB)	60.22 m
8.	Qiu Qiaoping (CHN)	59.32 m
9.	Vladimíra Malátová (TCH)	59.04 m
10.	Ilga Bērtulsone (LAT)	58.92 m
11.	Connie Price-Smith (USA)	58.66 m
12.	Mette Bergmann (NOR)	58.32 m
13.	Carla Garrett (USA)	58.06 m
14.	Jackie McKernan (GBR)	51.94 m

RANK	GROUP B	DISTANCE
1.	Stefania Simova (BUL)	65.60 m
2.	Olga Burova (EUN)	64.78 m
3.	Ilke Wyludda (GER)	64.26 m
4.	Franka Dietzsch (GER)	63.60 m
5.	Hilda Ramos (CUB)	62.82 m
6.	Min Chunfeng (CHN)	62.48 m
7.	Irina Yatchenko (EUN)	61.60 m
8.	Agnese Maffeis (ITA)	60.88 m
9.	Manuela Tîrneci (ROU)	59.44 m
10.	Cristina Boiț (ROU)	56.68 m
11.	Penny Neer (USA)	55.44 m
12.	Ángeles Barreiro (ESP)	53.14 m
13.	Ursula Weber (AUT)	51.62 m
14.	Teresa Machado (POR)	49.58 m

== Final ==
Rank	Athlete	Attempts						Distance	Note
Rank	Athlete	1	2	3	4	5	6	Distance	Note
1st place, gold medalist(s)	Maritza Martén (CUB)	65.66	X	X	66.90	70.06	66.36	70.06 m	
2nd place, silver medalist(s)	Tsvetanka Khristova (BUL)	65.14	67.78	65.32	X	X	X	67.78 m	
3rd place, bronze medalist(s)	Daniela Costian (AUS)	64.40	64.08	64.24	64.92	66.24	65.94	66.24 m	
4	Larisa Korotkevich (EUN)	60.94	X	65.52	X	64.30	X	65.52 m	
5	Olga Burova (EUN)	64.02	X	62.80	61.84	X	63.32	64.02 m	
6	Hilda Ramos (CUB)	62.16	X	62.72	59.28	X	63.80	63.80 m	
7	Irina Yatchenko (EUN)	60.76	62.40	63.74	X	X	X	63.74 m	
8	Stefania Simova (BUL)	X	63.42	63.08	60.20	62.38	60.98	63.42 m	
9	Ilke Wyludda (GER)	62.16	61.04	X				62.16 m	
10	Agnese Maffeis (ITA)	61.22	60.80	X				61.22 m	
11	Min Chunfeng (CHN)	59.06	60.82	X				60.82 m	
12	Franka Dietzsch (GER)	60.24	X	X				60.24 m	

== See also ==
- 1988 Women's Olympic Discus Throw (Seoul)
- 1990 Women's European Championships Discus Throw (Split)
- 1991 Women's World Championships Discus Throw (Tokyo)
- 1993 Women's World Championships Discus Throw (Stuttgart)
- 1994 Women's European Championships Discus Throw (Helsinki)
