= Athletics at the 1985 Summer Universiade – Women's discus throw =

The women's discus throw event at the 1985 Summer Universiade was held at the Kobe Universiade Memorial Stadium in Kobe on 2 September 1985.

== Results ==
Rank	Athlete	Nationality	Result	Notes
1st place, gold medalist(s)	Maritza Martén	Cuba	66.66	
2nd place, silver medalist(s)	Tsvetanka Khristova	Bulgaria	65.30	
3rd place, bronze medalist(s)	Daniela Costian	Romania	63.20	
4	Hilda Ramos	Cuba	62.98	
5	Gabriela Hanuláková	Czechoslovakia	62.58	
6	Márta Kripli	Hungary	62.48	
7	Simona Andrusca	Romania	60.94	
8	Carol Cady	United States	58.20	
9	Ikuko Kitamori	Japan	49.72	
10	Quennah Beasley	United States	45.64	
11	Vijayamala Datta	India	38.26	
