= Athletics at the 1995 Summer Universiade – Women's discus throw =

The women's discus throw event at the 1995 Summer Universiade was held on 31 August at the Hakatanomori Athletic Stadium in Fukuoka, Japan.

== Results ==
Rank	Athlete	Nationality	#1	#2	#3	#4	#5	#6	Result	Notes
1st place, gold medalist(s)	Natalya Sadova	Russia	62.18	x	60.62	x	x	62.92	62.92	
2nd place, silver medalist(s)	Anja Gündler	Germany	54.96	x	59.96	58.32	60.78	60.44	60.78	
3rd place, bronze medalist(s)	Bao Dongying	China	58.10	59.30	58.22	57.50	56.08	57.84	59.30	
4	Corrie de Bruin	Netherlands	59.12	x	x	58.08	57.44	x	59.12	
5	Lyudmila Filimonova	Belarus	52.46	55.48	58.82	56.64	x	x	58.82	
6	Danyel Mitchell	United States	55.04	53.72	56.68	55.24	56.56	58.64	58.64	
7	Yu Qingmei	China	x	52.00	53.86	49.98	56.04	x	56.04	
8	Monique Kuenen	Netherlands	53.14	53.32	52.82	53.08	51.90	x	53.32	
9	Melissa Weis	United States	52.92	x	51.94				52.92	
10	Elisângela Adriano	Brazil	49.88	x	52.14				52.14	
11	Felicity Johnston	Australia	50.20	x	49.10				50.20	
12	Georgette Reed	Canada	50.18	49.96	48.72				50.18	
13	Adrienne Lynn	New Zealand	x	48.78	49.64				49.64	
14	Miyoko Nakanishi	Japan	48.56	44.48	x				48.56	
15	Cathy Griffin	Canada	x	46.66	x				46.66	
16	Christina Matafa	American Samoa	43.80	41.98	43.82				43.82	
17	Ana Lucía Espinoza	Guatemala	36.00	37.84	34.80				37.84	
	Alexandra Amaro	Brazil	x	–	–				NM	
