= Ilga =

Ilga or ILGA may refer to:

- Ilga (river), a river in Russia, tributary of the Lena
- International Lesbian, Gay, Bisexual, Trans and Intersex Association, or ILGA
- Illinois General Assembly, in the United States
- Ilga, a Latvian feminine given name; people with this name include:
  - Ilga Bērtulsone, Latvian athlete
  - Ilga Kļaviņa, Latvian chess player
  - Ilga Šuplinska, Latvian politician
  - Ilga Winicov, American biologist
- Ilga Manor, in Latvia

== See also ==
- IIGA
