= Athletics at the 1996 Summer Olympics – Women's discus throw =

Women's discus throw at the Games of the XXVI Olympiad
- Pictogram for athletics
- Venue: Centennial Olympic Stadium
- Date: 28 July 1996 (qualifications); 29 July 1996 (finals)
- Competitors: 39 from 25 nations
- Winning distance: 69.66

Medalists
1st place, gold medalist(s)		Ilke Wyludda; Germany
2nd place, silver medalist(s)		Natalya Sadova; Russia
3rd place, bronze medalist(s)		Ellina Zvereva; Belarus

There were a total number of 39 competitors in the women's discus throw event at the 1996 Summer Olympics in Atlanta, Georgia, with the qualification round mark set at 62.00 metres.

== Medalists ==
Gold	Ilke Wyludda; Germany
Silver	Natalya Sadova; Russia
Bronze	Ellina Zvereva; Belarus

== Results ==
=== Qualification ===
Qualification Rules: Qualifying performance 62.00 (Q) or at least 12 best performers (q) advance to the Final.

Rank	Group	Athlete	Nation	#1	#2	#3	Result	Notes
1	A	Ilke Wyludda	Germany	66.78			66.78	Q
2	B	Xiao Yanling	China	59.56	59.60	65.10	65.10	Q
3	B	Franka Dietzsch	Germany	63.94			63.94	Q
4	B	Anja Gündler	Germany	53.10	61.72	63.80	63.80	Q
5	A	Olga Chernyavskaya	Russia	60.36	59.62	63.02	63.02	Q
6	A	Nicole Grasu	Romania	63.00			63.00	Q
6	B	Lisa-Marie Vizaniari	Australia	63.00			63.00	Q
8	A	Ellina Zvereva	Belarus	61.86	62.74		62.74	Q
9	B	Natalya Sadova	Russia	59.50	61.36	62.28	62.28	Q
10	B	Mette Bergmann	Norway	59.60	62.24		62.24	Q
11	B	Ira Yatchenko	Belarus	59.60	62.04		62.04	Q
12	A	Teresa Machado	Portugal	59.14	62.02		62.02	Q
13	B	Bárbara Hechavarría	Cuba	56.74	61.38	61.98	61.98	
14	A	Daniela Costian	Australia	61.66	x	61.24	61.66	
15	B	Alice Matejková	Czech Republic	60.72	59.40	x	60.72	
16	A	Maritza Martén	Cuba	59.70	57.80	60.08	60.08	
17	A	Atanaska Angelova	Bulgaria	59.82	x	x	59.82	
18	A	Anastasia Kelesidou	Greece	59.60	58.44	58.56	59.60	
19	A	Zdeňka Šilhavá	Czech Republic	59.24	57.98	57.14	59.24	
20	B	Jacqui McKernan	Great Britain	53.74	58.88	57.60	58.88	
21	B	Jacqueline Goormachtigh	Netherlands	55.70	56.94	58.74	58.74	
22	A	Ekaterini Voggoli	Greece	58.24	55.48	58.70	58.70	
23	B	Beatrice Faumuina	New Zealand	57.30	x	58.40	58.40	
24	B	Valentina Ivanova	Russia	58.30	58.38	58.32	58.38	
25	A	Renata Katewicz	Poland	x	x	58.24	58.24	
25	B	Eha Rünne	Estonia	x	x	58.24	58.24	
27	B	Cristina Boit	Romania	58.10	x	x	58.10	
28	A	Monia Kari	Tunisia	x	53.02	58.02	58.02	
29	B	Olena Antonova	Ukraine	57.56	57.92	54.82	57.92	
30	A	Lacy Barnes-Mileham	United States	x	57.48	56.32	57.48	
31	B	Stella Tsikouna	Greece	x	53.62	56.66	56.66	
32	A	Agnese Maffeis	Italy	x	x	56.54	56.54	
33	B	Suzy Powell	United States	55.06	56.24	53.98	56.24	
34	A	Aretha Hill	United States	56.04	55.20	55.14	56.04	
35	A	Liliana Martinelli	Argentina	51.46	55.68	x	55.68	
36	A	Corrie de Bruin	Netherlands	x	x	55.48	55.48	
37	B	Isabelle Devaluez	France	55.08	x	53.92	55.08	
38	A	Lyudmila Filimonova	Belarus	x	53.30	x	53.30	
39	A	Oumou Traoré	Mali	x	39.70	37.16	39.70	

=== Final ===
Rank	Athlete	Nation	#1	#2	#3	#4	#5	#6	Result	Notes
1st place, gold medalist(s)	Ilke Wyludda	Germany	68.02	69.66	66.70	67.86	67.34	x	69.66	
2nd place, silver medalist(s)	Natalya Sadova	Russia	62.04	65.66	63.34	66.48	65.72	65.82	66.48	
3rd place, bronze medalist(s)	Ellina Zvereva	Belarus	63.96	65.64	65.64	63.02	64.10	64.84	65.64	
4	Franka Dietzsch	Germany	64.22	65.48	63.90	63.56	x	x	65.48	
5	Xiao Yanling	China	56.90	63.34	63.72	60.86	64.72	x	64.72	
6	Olga Chernyavskaya	Russia	64.70	64.06	x	64.20	61.40	x	64.70	
7	Nicole Grasu	Romania	61.12	63.28	x	59.92	62.78	63.26	63.28	
8	Lisa-Marie Vizaniari	Australia	62.48	x	59.62	60.32	x	59.96	62.48	
9	Mette Bergmann	Norway	59.48	x	62.28				62.28	
10	Teresa Machado	Portugal	61.38	60.48	60.02				61.38	
11	Anja Gündler	Germany	61.16	60.76	59.48				61.16	
12	Ira Yatchenko	Belarus	x	57.76	60.46				60.46	

== See also ==
- 1995 Women's World Championships Discus Throw
- 1997 Women's World Championships Discus Throw
