= Athletics at the 1993 Summer Universiade – Women's discus throw =

The women's discus throw event at the 1993 Summer Universiade was held at the UB Stadium in Buffalo, United States on 16 and 17 July 1993.

== Medalists ==
Gold	Silver	Bronze
Renata Katewicz; Poland	Jackie McKernan; Great Britain	Anja Gündler; Germany

== Results ==
=== Qualification ===
Rank	Group	Athlete	Nationality	Result	Notes
1	A	Ilona Zaharchenko	Ukraine	60.00	
2	B	Renata Katewicz	Poland	59.16	
3	B	Anja Gündler	Germany	58.90	
4	B	Lyudmila Filimonova	Belarus	58.90	
5	?	Olga Gómez	Cuba	58.74	
6	A	Bárbara Hechavarría	Cuba	58.34	
7	?	Zhang Cuilan	China	57.52	
8	?	Jackie McKernan	Great Britain	56.90	
9	A	Simone Schmitt	Germany	56.46	
10	?	Isabelle Devaluez	France	54.30	
11	?	Alice Matějková	Czech Republic	54.12	
12	?	Janet Hill	United States	53.78	
13	?	Sonia Godall	Spain	52.50	
14	?	Kris Kuehl	United States	51.90	
15	?	Ekaterini Voggoli	Greece	51.58	
16	?	Mara Rosolen	Italy	50.78	
17	?	Sharon Andrews	Great Britain	50.22	
18	?	Hüsniye Keskin	Turkey	46.42	
19	?	Nelly Acosta	Puerto Rico	37.76	
20	?	Cathy Griffin	Canada	35.76	

=== Final ===
Rank	Athlete	Nationality	Result	Notes
1st place, gold medalist(s)	Renata Katewicz	Poland	62.40	
2nd place, silver medalist(s)	Jackie McKernan	Great Britain	60.72	=PB
3rd place, bronze medalist(s)	Anja Gündler	Germany	60.56	
4	Bárbara Hechavarría	Cuba	60.10	
5	Lyudmila Filimonova	Belarus	59.96	
6	Olga Gómez	Cuba	59.54	
7	Ilona Zaharchenko	Ukraine	58.78	
8	Zhang Cuilan	China	57.64	
9	Isabelle Devaluez	France	56.70	
10	Alice Matějková	Czech Republic	56.00	
11	Simone Schmitt	Germany	55.56	
12	Janet Hill	United States	53.42	
