= Masters W40 discus world record progression =

Masters W40 discus world record progression is the progression of world record improvements of the discus W40 division of Masters athletics. Records must be set in properly conducted, official competitions under the standing IAAF rules unless modified by World Masters Athletics. The W40 division consists of female athletes who have reached the age of 40 but have not yet reached the age of 45, so exactly from their 40th birthday to the day before their 45th birthday. The W40 division throws exactly the same 1 kg implement as the Open division.

Key

Incomplete information Pending

| Distance | Athlete | Nationality | Birthdate | Location | Date |
|---|---|---|---|---|---|
| 67.89 | Iryna Yatchenko | Belarus | 31.10.1965 | Stayki | 29.06.2008 |
| 67.10 | Ellina Zvereva | Belarus | 16.11.1960 | Edmonton | 11.08.2001 |
| 65.78 | Ellina Zvereva | Belarus | 16.11.1960 | Edmonton | 09.08.2001 |
| 63.70 | Helgi Parts | Soviet Union | 15.09.1937 | Tallinn | 02.10.1980 |
| 58.50 | Lia Manoliu | Romania | 25.04.1932 | Munich | 10.09.1972 |
