= 1990 World Junior Championships in Athletics – Women's discus throw =

The women's discus throw event at the 1990 World Junior Championships in Athletics was held in Plovdiv, Bulgaria, at Deveti Septemvri Stadium on 11 and 12 August.

== Medalists ==
Gold	Natalya Koptyukh; Soviet Union
Silver	Lisa-Marie Vizaniari; Australia
Bronze	Anja Gündler; East Germany

== Results ==
=== Final ===
12 August

Rank	Name	Nationality	Attempts						Result	Notes
Rank	Name	Nationality	1	2	3	4	5	6	Result	Notes
1st place, gold medalist(s)	Natalya Koptyukh	Soviet Union	54.44	x	56.64	53.90	61.44	58.26	61.44	
2nd place, silver medalist(s)	Lisa-Marie Vizaniari	Australia	53.54	55.94	56.38	57.88	60.44	x	60.44	
3rd place, bronze medalist(s)	Anja Gündler	East Germany	55.96	56.52	56.66	59.02	59.30	57.82	59.30	
4	Qiu Qiaoping	China	57.30	x	57.86	56.38	x	55.70	57.86	
5	Lyudmila Filimonova	Soviet Union	x	x	52.34	53.20	x	x	53.20	
6	Nicoleta Gradinaru	Romania	52.66	53.10	x	x	52.92	x	53.10	
7	Ilona Gersdorff	East Germany	x	51.30	50.32	x	x	47.58	51.30	
8	Paulina Gugniewicz	Poland	50.92	49.90	x	50.08	x	50.84	50.92	
9	Melisa Weis	United States	x	50.58	49.84				50.58	
10	Olga Riera	Spain	47.32	x	49.54				49.54	
11	Felicity Johnston	Australia	48.94	47.40	49.08				49.08	
12	Nitta Veikkolainen	Finland	x	48.94	48.22				48.94	
13	Emma Merry	United Kingdom	44.42	x	48.26				48.26	
14	Dawn Dumble	United States	47.90	45.14	48.24				48.24	
15	Kati Siltovuori	Finland	48.04	45.16	47.60				48.04	
16	Ivana Svoradová	Czechoslovakia	x	47.42	x				47.42	
17	Atanaska Angelova	Bulgaria	47.12	x	x				47.12	
18	Alice Meyer	France	45.42	46.46	44.64				46.46	

=== Qualifications ===
11 Aug

==== Group A ====
Rank	Name	Nationality	Attempts			Result	Notes
Rank	Name	Nationality	1	2	3	Result	Notes
1	Natalya Koptyukh	Soviet Union	54.66	-	-	54.66	Q
2	Nicoleta Gradinaru	Romania	53.66	-	-	53.66	Q
3	Lisa-Marie Vizaniari	Australia	53.50	-	-	53.50	Q
4	Anja Gündler	East Germany	x	43.92	52.80	52.80	Q
5	Qiu Qiaoping	China	52.44	-	-	52.44	Q
6	Ilona Gersdorff	East Germany	x	51.54	-	51.54	Q
7	Felicity Johnston	Australia	47.28	45.98	49.82	49.82	Q
8	Olga Riera	Spain	49.52	-	-	49.52	Q
9	Melisa Weis	United States	46.10	49.16	-	49.16	Q
10	Atanaska Angelova	Bulgaria	49.02	-	-	49.02	Q
11	Nitta Veikkolainen	Finland	47.92	x	48.90	48.90	Q
12	Dawn Dumble	United States	48.86	-	-	48.86	Q
13	Paulina Gugniewicz	Poland	48.40	-	-	48.40	Q
14	Lyudmila Filimonova	Soviet Union	45.88	48.18	-	48.18	Q
15	Ivana Svoradová	Czechoslovakia	x	48.16	-	48.16	Q
16	Kati Siltovuori	Finland	48.12	-	-	48.12	Q
17	Emma Merry	United Kingdom	48.02	-	-	48.02	Q
18	Alice Meyer	France	47.14	46.98	48.00	48.00	Q
19	Elisângela Adriano	Brazil	46.18	47.10	43.80	47.10	
20	Carmen Sole	Spain	45.08	45.88	x	45.88	
21	Sabine Fried	West Germany	43.22	x	45.30	45.30	
22	Joanna Wiśniewska	Poland	x	x	45.02	45.02	
23	Eva Cernanová	Czechoslovakia	43.76	x	40.34	43.76	
24	Margit Gesierich	Austria	x	41.58	x	41.58	
25	Sadith Fretes	Paraguay	39.24	38.80	x	39.24	

== Participation ==
According to an unofficial count, 25 athletes from 17 countries participated in the event.

- Australia (2)
- Austria (1)
- Brazil (1)
- Bulgaria (1)
- China (1)
- Czechoslovakia (2)
- East Germany (2)
- Finland (2)
- France (1)
- Paraguay (1)
- Poland (2)
- Romania (1)
- Soviet Union (2)
- Spain (2)
- United Kingdom (1)
- United States (2)
- West Germany (1)
