= Larisa Korotkevich =

Russian discus thrower (born 1967)

Larisa Korotkevich (Russian: Лариса Короткевич; born 3 January 1967) is a retired female discus thrower from Russia. Her personal best throw is 71.30 m (233 ft 11 in), achieved on 29 May 1992 in Sochi. This mark ranks her 16th on the all-time discus rankings and, as of 2014, no woman has surpassed that mark since it was set.

Korotkevich competed twice at the Summer Olympics, once for the Unified Team in 1992 and later for Russia in 2000. Her best performance was fourth place in 1992. She made four appearances at the World Championships in Athletics and had a best finish of fourth in 1999. She was a two-time discus champion at the Russian Athletics Championships (1993 and 1997). She won two international medals over her career: a bronze at the 1985 European Athletics Junior Championships and gold at the 1993 European Cup. She ranked number one in the world in the 1993 athletics season with a mark of 68.14 m (223 ft 6 1/2 in).

== Career ==
Born in Orsha, Belarus SSR, Korotkevich won her first international medal representing the Soviet Union at the 1985 European Athletics Junior Championships, where she placed third in the discus – an event won by future Olympic champion Ilke Wyludda. Her senior debut for her nation came two years later at the 1987 World Championships in Athletics, at which the 20-year-old placed tenth. Korotkevich did not progress much further until the Dissolution of the Soviet Union.

A personal best of 71.30 m (233 ft 11 in) in May 1992 earned her a place on the Unified Team at the 1992 Summer Olympics. She entered the competition as the highest ranked athlete that season (world leader Xiao Yanling did not attend). In the Olympic discus final her best mark came in the third round in the form of a 65.52 m (214 ft 11 1/2 in) throw. This moved her up to third, but she was then beaten out of the medals by Australia's Daniela Costian. Straight after the Olympics she showed her form at the Herculis meeting in Monaco by winning in a meet record of 69.30 m (227 ft 4 1/4 in) – a mark still standing as of 2014. Korotkevich was chosen for the 1992 IAAF World Cup held one month later, but was again out of the medals in fourth place, this time edged out by Chinese Min Chunfeng. She finally reached a podium at the 1992 IAAF Grand Prix Final – a throw of 65.70 m (215 ft 6 1/2 in) beat her compatriot Irina Yatchenko to leave her runner-up behind Wyludda.

Opting for Russian citizenship, Korotkevich had a highly successful opening season for her new country. She won the Russian Athletics Championships with a 67.52 m (221 ft 6 1/4 in) performance, then held off namesake Larisa Mikhalchenko of Ukraine to lift the title at the 1993 European Cup. A throw of 68.14 m (223 ft 6 1/2 in) proved to be the best by any woman in the world that year. Korotkevich failed to carry through this form at the 1993 World Championships in Athletics as, despite entered as the world-leading athlete, she failed to progress to the final round. Her national rival Olga Chernyavskaya was the eventual world champion.

After several years away from the top level, she returned in 1997 and won the Brothers Znamensky Memorial with a throw of 64.92 m (212 ft 11 3/4 in). Her second Russian national title following shortly after. At the 1997 World Championships in Athletics she was again fourth place at a major global event, some two metres off the bronze medallist and fellow Russian Natalya Sadova. She was in lesser form the following season, having a best of 61.66 m (202 ft 3 1/2 in), but she still managed second place at the Russian Championships, as women's throws performances declined in an era of increasing drug testing scrutiny.

In 1999 she had the best throw of her later career with a mark of 67.65 m (221 ft 11 1/4 in) in Krasnodar, ranking her fifth in the world that year. She was runner-up at the Znamensky Memorial and the Russian Championships, but on her fourth career outing at the 1999 World Championships in Athletics she did not make the final. Korotkevich's final season in international athletics came in 2000. Her best that year – 64.37 m (211 ft 2 1/4 in) – was during a third straight runner-up finish at the Russian Championships. Her second and final Olympic appearance followed at the 2000 Sydney Games. She was eliminated in the qualifying round and retired thereafter.

== International competition record ==
Year	Competition	Venue	Position	Notes
Representing Soviet Union
1985	European Junior Championships	Cottbus, East Germany	3rd	
1987	World Championships	Rome, Italy	10th	60.74 m
Representing Unified Team
1992	Olympic Games	Barcelona, Spain	4th	65.52 m
1992	World Cup	Havana, Cuba	4th	
Representing Russia
1997	World Championships	Athens, Greece	4th	63.02 m
2000	Olympic Games	Sydney, Australia	20th	58.81 m

Sporting positions
Preceded by Xiao Yanling	Women's Discus Best Year Performance; 1993	Succeeded by Daniela Costian; Ilke Wyludda
