= 1988 World Junior Championships in Athletics – Women's discus throw =

The women's discus throw event at the 1988 World Junior Championships in Athletics was held in Sudbury, Ontario, Canada, at Laurentian University Stadium on 30 and 31 July.

== Medalists ==
Gold	Ilke Wyludda; East Germany
Silver	Astrid Kumbernuss; East Germany
Bronze	Proletka Voycheva; Bulgaria

== Results ==
=== Final ===
31 July

Rank	Name	Nationality	Result	Notes
1st place, gold medalist(s)	Ilke Wyludda	East Germany	68.24	
2nd place, silver medalist(s)	Astrid Kumbernuss	East Germany	64.08	
3rd place, bronze medalist(s)	Proletka Voycheva	Bulgaria	58.94	
4	Min Chunfeng	China	56.90	
5	Alla Kokhan	Soviet Union	54.32	
6	Zhao Yonghua	China	53.98	
7	Tatyana Lugovskaya	Soviet Union	53.38	
8	Manuela Tirneci	Romania	53.28	
9	Teresa Machado	Portugal	48.36	
10	Ekateríni Vóngoli	Greece	48.02	
11	Vanessa French	Australia	43.74	
12	Tracey Millett	United States	42.40	

=== Qualifications ===
30 Jul

==== Group A ====
Rank	Name	Nationality	Result	Notes
1	Ilke Wyludda	East Germany	65.78	Q
2	Astrid Kumbernuss	East Germany	61.28	Q
3	Proletka Voycheva	Bulgaria	52.20	Q
4	Manuela Tirneci	Romania	52.08	Q
5	Min Chunfeng	China	52.06	Q
6	Tatyana Lugovskaya	Soviet Union	51.38	Q
7	Zhao Yonghua	China	51.08	Q
8	Alla Kokhan	Soviet Union	50.84	Q
9	Teresa Machado	Portugal	48.54	Q
10	Ekateríni Vóngoli	Greece	47.72	Q
11	Vanessa French	Australia	47.32	Q
12	Tracey Millett	United States	46.54	q
13	Päivi Hautaniemi	Finland	46.42	
14	Janet Hill	United States	45.68	
15	Anna Mosdell	Canada	45.62	
16	Rochelle Sutton	Australia	44.08	

== Participation ==
According to an unofficial count, 16 athletes from 11 countries participated in the event.

- Australia (2)
- Bulgaria (1)
- Canada (1)
- China (2)
- East Germany (2)
- Finland (1)
- Greece (1)
- Portugal (1)
- Romania (1)
- Soviet Union (2)
- United States (2)
