= Athletics at the 1983 Summer Universiade – Women's discus throw =

Women's discus throw event at the 1983 Summer Universiade

The women's discus throw event at the 1983 Summer Universiade was held at the Commonwealth Stadium in Edmonton, Canada on 8 July 1983.

== Results ==
Rank	Athlete	Nationality	Result	Notes
1st place, gold medalist(s)	Florența Crăciunescu	Romania	64.56	
2nd place, silver medalist(s)	Natalya Akhrimenko	Soviet Union	62.62	
3rd place, bronze medalist(s)	Lyubov Urakova	Soviet Union	58.28	
4	Ingra-Anne Manecke	West Germany	57.52	
5	Hilda Ramos	Cuba	57.14	
6	Kathy Picknell	United States	54.54	
7	Penny Neer	United States	53.38	
8	Sharon Curik	Canada	46.40	
9	Carole Dagher	Lebanon	30.76	
	Maritza Martén	Cuba	NM	
