= Hilda Ramos =

Cuban discus thrower (born 1964)

Personal information
- Born: 1 September 1964 (age 61) Matanzas, Cuba

Sport
- Sport: Track and field
Medal record
Representing Cuba
Pan American Games
Silver medal – second place	1987 Indianapolis	Discus throw
Silver medal – second place	1991 Havana	Discus throw
Central American and Caribbean Games
Gold medal – first place	1986 Santiago	Discus throw
Silver medal – second place	1998 Maracaibo	Discus throw

Hilda Elisa Ramos Manes (born 1 September 1964) is a retired Cuban discus thrower.

Her personal best throw is 70.88 metres, achieved in May 1992 in Havana. This is the current North American, Central American and Caribbean (NACAC) record.

== International competitions ==
Year	Competition	Venue	Position	Event	Notes
Representing Cuba
1983	Universiade	Edmonton, Canada	5th	Discus	57.14 m
1984	Friendship Games	Prague, Czech Republic	11th	Discus	59.30 m
1985	Universiade	Kobe, Japan	4th	Discus	62.98 m
1986	Central American and Caribbean Games	Santiago, Dominican Republic	1st	Discus	63.44 m
1987	Pan American Games	Indianapolis, United States	2nd	Discus	61.34 m
1990	Goodwill Games	Seattle, United States	5th	Discus	63.92 m
1991	Pan American Games	Havana, Cuba	2nd	Discus	63.38 m
1992	Ibero-American Championships	Seville, Spain	1st	Discus	67.46 m
1992	Olympic Games	Barcelona, Spain	6th	Discus	63.80 m
1998	Central American and Caribbean Games	Maracaibo, Venezuela	2nd	Discus	55.42 m
