= Masters W50 discus world record progression =

Masters W50 discus world record progression is the progression of world record improvements of the discus W50 division of Masters athletics. Records must be set in properly conducted, official competitions under the standing IAAF rules unless modified by World Masters Athletics. The W50 division consists of female athletes who have reached the age of 50 but have not yet reached the age of 55, so exactly from their 50th birthday to the day before their 55th birthday. The W50 division throws exactly the same 1 kg implement as the Open division.

Key

Incomplete information Pending

Distance	Athlete	Nationality	Birthdate	Location	Date
46.11	Olga Chernyavskaya	Russia	17.09.1963	Lyon	11.08.2015
45.82	Eha Rünne	Estonia	25.05.1963	İzmir	27.08.2014
45.67	Carol Finsrud	United States	20.02.1957	Riccione	04.09.2007
45.48	Ingrid Miller	Sweden	22.11.1941	Stockholm	06.09.1992
44.48	Ljudmila Hmelevskaja	Soviet Union	30.03.1940	Turku	26.07.1991
43.82	Valerie Young	New Zealand	10.08.1937	Christchurch	01.10.1988
41.86	Ann Chatrine Rühlow	Germany	30.09.1936	Verona	01.06.1988
48.06	Odette Domingos	Brazil	05.09.1934	São Paulo	23.06.1987
40.92	Zsuzsa Serédi Wissinger	Hungary	07.02.1934	Malmö	28.06.1986
39.94	Sigrun Kofink	Germany	23.04.1935	Denkendorf	13.07.1985
39.74	Ruth Svedberg	Sweden	14.04.1903	Gothenburg	17.09.1954
