= Renata Katewicz =

Polish discus thrower

Personal information
- Born: 2 May 1965 (age 61) Kaniczki, Pomorskie, Poland

Sport
- Sport: Track and field
Medal record
Representing Poland
Summer Universiade
Gold medal – first place	1993 Buffalo	Discus throw

Renata Katewicz (born 2 May 1965 in ) is a retired female discus thrower from Poland. She represented her native country twice at the Summer Olympics; in 1988 and 1996. Katewicz is best known for winning the gold medal in the women's discus event at the 1993 Summer Universiade in Buffalo, United States.

== International competitions ==
Year	Competition	Venue	Position	Notes
Representing Poland
1983	European Junior Championships	Schwechat, Austria	6th	56.26 m
1986	European Championships	Stuttgart, West Germany	8th	58.36 m
1987	World Championships	Rome, Italy	11th	58.22 m
1988	Olympic Games	Seoul, South Korea	13th (q)	60.34 m
1989	Universiade	Duisburg, West Germany	13th	54.10 m
1993	Universiade	Buffalo, United States	1st	62.40 m
1993	World Championships	Stuttgart, Germany	15th (q)	60.66 m
1994	European Championships	Helsinki, Finland	16th (q)	56.32 m
1996	Olympic Games	Atlanta, United States	25th (q)	58.24 m
