= Athletics at the 1995 Pan American Games – Women's discus throw =

Women's discus throw at the Pan American Games

The women's discus throw event at the 1995 Pan American Games was held at the Estadio Atletico "Justo Roman" on 24 March.

== Results ==
| Rank | Name | Nationality | #1 | #2 | #3 | #4 | #5 | #6 | Result | Notes |
|---|---|---|---|---|---|---|---|---|---|---|
| 1st place, gold medalist(s) | Maritza Martén | Cuba | 58.50 | 57.44 | 61.22 | x | x | x | 61.22 | |
| 2nd place, silver medalist(s) | Bárbara Hechavarría | Cuba | 59.54 | x | 60.20 | x | 58.72 | 54.52 | 60.20 | |
| 3rd place, bronze medalist(s) | Kristin Kuehl | United States | 50.20 | 52.44 | 50.40 | 48.96 | 47.96 | 56.92 | 56.92 | |
| 4 | María Isabel Urrutia | Colombia | 48.68 | 54.72 | 56.00 | x | 53.02 | 54.82 | 56.00 | |
| 5 | Liliana Martinelli | Argentina | 53.92 | 53.24 | x | x | x | x | 53.92 | |
| 6 | Elisângela Adriano | Brazil | x | 50.92 | 53.30 | 52.76 | 49.62 | 53.26 | 53.30 | |
| 7 | Theresa Brick | Canada | 50.18 | 48.78 | x | x | 47.40 | x | 50.18 | |
| 8 | Alexandra Amaro | Brazil | 46.34 | 47.46 | 47.90 | 47.68 | x | – | 47.90 | |
| 9 | Georgette Reed | Canada | 46.06 | 42.16 | 46.66 | | | | 46.66 | |
| 10 | Carmen Chalá | Ecuador | 43.30 | 43.08 | 42.84 | | | | 43.30 | |
| 11 | Sadith Fretes | Paraguay | 42.20 | 41.52 | 42.52 | | | | 42.52 | |
| | Ramona Pagel | United States | | | | | | | DNS | |
| | Connie Price-Smith | United States | | | | | | | DNS | |
