= Alice Matějková =

Spanish discus thrower

Personal information
- Born: 11 January 1969 (age 57) Hořovice, Czechoslovakia

Sport
- Sport: Track and field

Alice Matějková Honhová (born 11 January 1969) is a Czech-born Spanish discus thrower. She formerly represented her birth country of the Czech Republic. Her personal best throw is 62.66 metres, achieved in June 1997 in Kladno.

She finished seventh at the 1986 World Junior Championships and eighth at the 2002 IAAF World Cup. She competed at the World Championships in 1991, 1993 and 1997 as well as the Olympic Games in 1996, 2000 and 2004 without reaching the final.

== Competition record ==
Year	Competition	Venue	Position	Event	Notes
Representing Czechoslovakia
1986	World Junior Championships	Athens, Greece	7th	Discus throw	48.48 m
1991	World Championships	Tokyo, Japan	25th (q)	Discus throw	53.22 m
Representing Czech Republic
1993	Universiade	Buffalo, United States	11th	Shot put	14.61 m
1993	Universiade	Buffalo, United States	10th	Discus throw	56.00 m
1993	World Championships	Stuttgart, Germany	28th (q)	Discus throw	53.86 m
1994	European Championships	Helsinki, Finland	21st (q)	Discus throw	54.14 m
1996	Olympic Games	Atlanta, United States	15th (q)	Discus throw	60.72 m
1997	World Championships	Athens, Greece	17th (q)	Discus throw	58.96 m
Representing Spain
2000	Olympic Games	Sydney, Australia	28th (q)	Discus throw	54.19 m
2001	Mediterranean Games	Radès, Tunisia	4th	Discus throw	56.23 m
2002	European Championships	Munich, Germany	13th (q)	Discus throw	56.18 m
2004	Ibero-American Championships	Huelva, Spain	3rd	Discus throw	57.58 m
2004	Olympic Games	Athens, Greece	36th (q)	Discus throw	55.37 m
