= 1986 World Junior Championships in Athletics – Women's discus throw =

The women's discus throw event at the 1986 World Junior Championships in Athletics was held in Athens, Greece, at Olympic Stadium on 19 and 20 July.

== Medalists ==
Gold	Ilke Wyludda; East Germany
Silver	Franka Dietzsch; East Germany
Bronze	Min Chunfeng; China

== Results ==
=== Final ===
20 July

Rank	Name	Nationality	Result	Notes
1st place, gold medalist(s)	Ilke Wyludda	East Germany	64.02	
2nd place, silver medalist(s)	Franka Dietzsch	East Germany	60.26	
3rd place, bronze medalist(s)	Min Chunfeng	China	54.00	
4	Stephanie Storp	West Germany	53.70	
5	Yvette Ykema	Australia	50.84	
6	Idalmis Leyva	Cuba	49.18	
7	Alice Matejková	Czechoslovakia	48.48	
8	Agnès Teppe	France	48.08	
9	Snezhana Pikhmanova	Bulgaria	45.96	
10	Vanessa French	Australia	45.88	
11	Jane Aucott	United Kingdom	45.26	
12	Michelle Brotherton	Canada	43.18	

=== Qualifications ===
19 Jul

==== Group A ====
Rank	Name	Nationality	Result	Notes
1	Ilke Wyludda	East Germany	61.58	Q
2	Franka Dietzsch	East Germany	60.08	Q
3	Min Chunfeng	China	52.62	Q
4	Stephanie Storp	West Germany	49.34	Q
5	Idalmis Leyva	Cuba	48.54	Q
6	Snezhana Pikhmanova	Bulgaria	47.60	Q
7	Jane Aucott	United Kingdom	47.42	Q
8	Agnès Teppe	France	47.12	Q
9	Michelle Brotherton	Canada	46.82	Q
10	Yvette Ykema	Australia	46.48	Q
11	Vanessa French	Australia	44.72	q
12	Alice Matejková	Czechoslovakia	44.48	q
13	Sonia Godall	Spain	42.64	
14	Tracy Crawford	United States	40.42	
15	Elvira Yufra	Peru	38.78	
16	Jane Woodhead	United States	38.02	
17	Suzanne Dandenault	Canada	36.50	
18	Harpreet Kaur	India	36.22	
19	Hanane Khaled	Egypt	32.36	

== Participation ==
According to an unofficial count, 19 athletes from 15 countries participated in the event.

- Australia (2)
- Bulgaria (1)
- Canada (2)
- China (1)
- Cuba (1)
- Czechoslovakia (1)
- East Germany (2)
- Egypt (1)
- France (1)
- India (1)
- Peru (1)
- Spain (1)
- United Kingdom (1)
- United States (2)
- West Germany (1)
