= Athletics at the 1987 Pan American Games – Women's discus throw =

Women's discus throw at the Pan American Games

The women's discus throw event at the 1987 Pan American Games was held in Indianapolis, United States on 10 August.

== Results ==
Rank	Name	Nationality	#1	#2	#3	#4	#5	#6	Result	Notes
1st place, gold medalist(s)	Maritza Martén	Cuba	x	65.58	x	59.92	61.94	63.86	65.58	GR
2nd place, silver medalist(s)	Hilda Ramos	Cuba	61.34	x	59.88	60.42	x	x	61.34	
3rd place, bronze medalist(s)	Connie Price	United States	58.42	x	x	59.52	57.34	x	59.52	
4	María Isabel Urrutia	Colombia	x	x	x	49.32	57.08	51.30	57.08	NR
5	Kelly Landry	United States	49.64	52.78	50.62	53.68	x	x	53.68	
6	Luz Quiñones	Ecuador	46.34	x	47.92	47.14	47.34	43.90	47.92	
7	Elvira Yufra	Peru	x	39.90	x	41.72	x	x	41.72	
