= Bárbara Hechavarría =

Cuban discus thrower (born 1966)

Personal information
- Born: 6 August 1966 (age 60) Holguín, Cuba

Sport
- Sport: Track and field
Medal record
Representing Cuba
Pan American Games
Gold medal – first place	1991 Havana	Discus throw
Silver medal – second place	1995 Mar del Plata	Discus throw
Central American and Caribbean Games
Gold medal – first place	1990 Mexico City	Discus throw
Gold medal – first place	1993 Ponce	Discus throw
Gold medal – first place	1998 Maracaibo	Discus throw

Bárbara Hechavarría Aponte (born 6 August 1966) is a retired female discus thrower from Cuba. Her personal best throw is 68.18 metres, achieved in February 1989 in Havana.

== Achievements ==
Year	Competition	Venue	Position	Notes
Representing Cuba
1986	Ibero-American Championships	Havana, Cuba	3rd	54.00 m
1987	Central American and Caribbean Championships	Caracas, Venezuela	1st	54.94 m
1988	Ibero-American Championships	Mexico City, Mexico	1st	56.34 m A
1989	Universiade	Duisburg, West Germany	9th	56.79 m
1990	Central American and Caribbean Games	Mexico City, Mexico	1st	58.62 m
1991	Pan American Games	Havana, Cuba	1st	63.50 m
1991	World Championships	Tokyo, Japan	12th	60.62 m
1992	Ibero-American Championships	Seville, Spain	2nd	64.14 m
1992	Olympic Games	Barcelona, Spain	15th (q)	60.22 m
1993	Universiade	Buffalo, United States	4th	60.10 m
1993	World Championships	Stuttgart, Germany	6th	62.52 m
1993	Central American and Caribbean Games	Ponce, Puerto Rico	1st	61.02 m
1994	Goodwill Games	St. Petersburg, Russia	1st	64.84 m
1995	Pan American Games	Mar del Plata, Argentina	2nd	60.20 m
1995	World Championships	Gothenburg, Sweden	10th	58.98 m
1996	Olympic Games	Atlanta, United States	13th (q)	61.98 m
1997	Central American and Caribbean Championships	San Juan, Puerto Rico	1st	57.42 m
1998	Goodwill Games	Uniondale, United States	5th	58.98 m
1998	Central American and Caribbean Games	Maracaibo, Venezuela	1st	58.14 m
