= Athletics at the 1983 Pan American Games – Women's discus throw =

Women's discus throw at the Pan American Games

The women's discus throw event at the 1983 Pan American Games was held in Caracas, Venezuela on 27 August.

== Results ==
Rank	Name	Nationality	Result	Notes
~~1~~	María Cristina Betancourt	Cuba	~~60.36~~	DQ
1st place, gold medalist(s)	Maritza Martén	Cuba	59.62	
2nd place, silver medalist(s)	Lorna Griffin	United States	56.52	
3rd place, bronze medalist(s)	Penny Neer	United States	53.32	
4	Yunaira Piña	Venezuela	43.52	
