= 1996 IAAF Grand Prix Final =

- Host city: Milan, Italy
- Events: 18
- Dates: 7 September
- Main venue: Arena Civica

The 1996 IAAF Grand Prix Final was the twelfth edition of the season-ending competition for the IAAF Grand Prix track and field circuit, organised by the International Association of Athletics Federations. It was held on 7 September at the Arena Civica in Milan, Italy.

Daniel Komen (5000 metres) and Ludmila Engquist (high jump) were the overall points winners of the tournament. A total of 18 athletics events were contested, ten for men and eight for women.

== Medal summary ==
=== Men ===
| Event | Gold | | Silver | | Bronze | |
|---|---|---|---|---|---|---|
| Overall | Daniel Komen (KEN) | 103 | Jonathan Edwards (GBR) | 99 | Dennis Mitchell (USA) | 95 |
| 100 metres | Dennis Mitchell (USA) | 9.91 | Donovan Bailey (CAN) | 9.95 | Osmond Ezinwa (NGR) | 10.05 |
| 400 metres | Michael Johnson (USA) | 44.53 | Anthuan Maybank (USA) | 45.19 | Derek Mills (USA) | 45.24 |
| 1500 metres | Hicham El Guerrouj (MAR) | 3:38.80 | Noureddine Morceli (ALG) | 3:39.69 | Laban Rotich (KEN) | 3:39.76 |
| 5000 metres | Daniel Komen (KEN) | 12:52.38 | Salah Hissou (MAR) | 12:54.83 | Paul Koech (KEN) | 13:00.67 |
| 400 m hurdles | Derrick Adkins (USA) | 48.63 | Torrance Zellner (USA) | 48.92 | Samuel Matete (ZAM) | 49.36 |
| High jump | Patrik Sjöberg (SWE) | 2.33 m | Steinar Hoen (NOR) | 2.30 m | Artur Partyka (POL) | 2.30 m |
| Pole vault | Maksim Tarasov (RUS) | 5.90 m | Igor Potapovich (KAZ) | 5.85 m | Igor Trandenkov (RUS) | 5.80 m |
| Triple jump | Jonathan Edwards (GBR) | 17.59 m | Yoelbi Quesada (CUB) | 17.39 m | Kenny Harrison (USA) | 17.21 m |
| Shot put | John Godina (USA) | 21.18 m | Randy Barnes (USA) | 21.14 m | Paolo Dal Soglio (ITA) | 21.13 m |
| Hammer throw | Lance Deal (USA) | 82.52 m | Igor Astapkovich (BLR) | 79.84 m | Heinz Weis (GER) | 78.38 m |

=== Women ===
| Event | Gold | | Silver | | Bronze | |
|---|---|---|---|---|---|---|
| Overall | Ludmila Engquist (SWE) | 93 | Merlene Ottey (JAM) | 90 | Michelle Freeman (JAM) | 85 |
| 100 metres | Merlene Ottey (JAM) | 10.74 | Gail Devers (USA) | 10.83 | Mary Onyali (NGR) | 11.00 |
| 400 metres | Cathy Freeman (AUS) | 49.60 | Falilat Ogunkoya (NGR) | 49.73 | Pauline Davis (BAH) | 49.87 |
| 1500 metres | Svetlana Masterkova (RUS) | 4:11.42 | Patricia Djaté (FRA) | 4:12.12 | Yekaterina Podkopayeva (RUS) | 4:12.14 |
| 5000 metres | Roberta Brunet (ITA) | 14:54.54 | Gete Wami (ETH) | 14:55.78 | Pauline Konga (KEN) | 14:56.32 |
| 100 m hurdles | Ludmila Engquist (SWE) | 12.61 | Michelle Freeman (JAM) | 12.69 | Dawn Bowles (USA) | 12.76 |
| Long jump | Inessa Kravets (UKR) | 7.07w m | Heike Drechsler (GER) | 6.87w m | Fiona May (ITA) | 6.86 m |
| Discus throw | Ilke Wyludda (GER) | 64.74 m | Ellina Zvereva (BLR) | 64.66 m | Nicoleta Grasu (ROM) | 63.64 m |
| Javelin throw | Tanja Damaske (GER) | 66.28 m | Steffi Nerius (GER) | 65.76 m | Oksana Ovchinnikova (RUS) | 65.30 m |
