= Jackie McKernan =

Former Northern Irish athlete

Personal information
- Nationality: British (Northern Irish)
- Born: 1 July 1965 (age 61) Belfast, Northern Ireland
- Height: 178 cm (5 ft 10 in)
- Weight: 73 kg (161 lb)

Sport
- Sport: Athletics
- Event: discus throw
- Club: Lisburn
Medal record
Representing Northern Ireland
Commonwealth Games
Silver medal – second place	1990 Auckland	Discus throw
Summer Universiade
Silver medal – second place	1993 Buffalo	Discus throw

Jacqueline Lena McKernan (born 1 July 1965) is a retired Northern Irish discus thrower. She represented Great Britain and Northern Ireland at three Olympic Games (1988, 1992, 1996) and won silver medals at the Commonwealth Games in 1990 and the Universiade in 1993.

== Biography ==
Born in Belfast, McKernan was a member of the City of Lisburn Athletics Club. McKernan became the British discus throw champion after winning the British AAA Championships title at the 1988 AAA Championships. It was the first of her six AAA titles, the others coming in 1991, 1992, 1994, 1996 and 1997.

She finished 18th in qualifying at the 1988 Summer Olympics, before going on to win a silver medal at the 1990 Commonwealth Games representing Northern Ireland, with a throw of 54.86 metres. She then finished 28th in qualifying at the 1992 Summer Olympics.

McKernan's personal best throw is 60.72 metres, achieved when winning the silver medal at the Summer Universiade on 17 July 1993 in Buffalo. This is the Northern Irish record, and places her sixth on the UK all-time list, behind Meg Ritchie, Jade Lally, Venissa Head, Philippa Roles and Shelley Newman. She finished 20th in the qualifying round at the 1996 Atlanta Olympics with 58.88 metres (her best throw at an Olympics).

== International competitions ==
Year	Competition	Venue	Position	Event	Notes
Representing Great Britain and Northern Ireland
1986	Commonwealth Games	Edinburgh, United Kingdom	8th	Shot put	11.77 m
1986	Commonwealth Games	Edinburgh, United Kingdom	9th	Discus throw	49.08 m
1988	Olympic Games	Seoul, South Korea	18th (q)	Discus throw	50.92 m
1990	Commonwealth Games	Auckland, New Zealand	2nd	Discus throw	54.86 m
1990	European Championships	Split, Yugoslavia	16th (q)	Discus throw	48.12 m
1991	World Championships	Tokyo, Japan	21st (q)	Discus throw	55.64 m
1992	Olympic Games	Barcelona, Spain	28th (q)	Discus throw	51.94 m
1993	Universiade	Buffalo, United States	2nd	Discus throw	60.72 m (PB)
1993	World Championships	Stuttgart, Germany	25th (q)	Discus throw	56.14 m
1994	European Championships	Helsinki, Finland	13th (q)	Discus throw	57.56 m
1994	Commonwealth Games	Victoria, Canada	5th	Discus throw	54.86 m
1995	World Championships	Gothenburg, Sweden	16th (q)	Discus throw	54.78 m
1996	Olympic Games	Atlanta, United States	20th (q)	Discus throw	58.88 m
1998	Commonwealth Games	Kuala Lumpur, Malaysia	5th	Discus throw	55.16 m
2002	Commonwealth Games	Manchester, United Kingdom	10th	Discus throw	50.45 m

=== National titles ===
- 6 AAA Championships (1988, 1991, 1992, 1994, 1996, 1997)
- 5 UK Championships (1989, 1990, 1991, 1992, 1993)
