= 1990 European Athletics Championships – Women's discus throw =

Women's discus throw at the European Athletics Championships

These are the official results of the Women's discus throw event at the 1990 European Championships in Split, Yugoslavia, held at Stadion Poljud on 28 and 29 August 1990. There were a total number of sixteen participating athletes.

== Medalists ==
Gold	Ilke Wyludda; East Germany
Silver	Olga Burova; Soviet Union
Bronze	Martina Hellmann; East Germany

== Final ==
Rank	Final	Distance
	Ilke Wyludda (GDR)	68.46 m
	Olga Burova (URS)	66.72 m
	Martina Hellmann (GDR)	66.66 m
4.	Gabriele Reinsch (GDR)	66.08 m
5.	Irina Yatchenko (URS)	65.16 m
6.	Ellina Zvereva (URS)	63.88 m
7.	Ursula Kreutel (FRG)	63.28 m
8.	Dagmar Galler (FRG)	62.08 m
9.	Agnese Maffeis (ITA)	58.36 m
10.	Tsvetanka Khristova (BUL)	56.30 m
11.	Marie-Paule Geldhof (BEL)	54.90 m
—	Mette Bergmann (NOR)	NM

== Qualification ==
Qualification standard: Qualification Performance 60.00 or at least 12 best performers advance to the final

Rank	Group A	Distance
1.	Olga Burova (URS)	64.56 m
2.	Martina Hellmann (GDR)	63.62 m
3.	Ellina Zvereva (URS)	60.24 m
4.	Ursula Kreutel (FRG)	59.88 m
5.	Mette Bergmann (NOR)	55.58 m
6.	Manuela Tîrneci (ROM)	52.68 m
7.	Ursula Weber (AUT)	50.26 m
8.	Jacqueline McKernan (GBR)	48.12 m

Rank	Group B	Distance
1.	Ilke Wyludda (GDR)	65.00 m
2.	Irina Yatchenko (URS)	63.34 m
3.	Gabriele Reinsch (GDR)	62.98 m
4.	Tsvetanka Khristova (BUL)	60.26 m
5.	Dagmar Galler (FRG)	59.40 m
6.	Agnese Maffeis (ITA)	56.46 m
7.	Marie-Paule Geldhof (BEL)	54.06 m
8.	Teresa Machado (POR)	51.78 m

== Participation ==
According to an unofficial count, 16 athletes from 11 countries participated in the event.

- Austria (1)
- Belgium (1)
- Bulgaria (1)
- East Germany (3)
- Italy (1)
- Norway (1)
- Portugal (1)
- Romania (1)
- Soviet Union (3)
- United Kingdom (1)
- West Germany (2)

== See also ==
- 1986 Women's European Championships Discus Throw (Stuttgart)
- 1987 Women's World Championships Discus Throw (Rome)
- 1988 Women's Olympic Discus Throw (Seoul)
- 1991 Women's World Championships Discus Throw (Tokyo)
- 1992 Women's Olympic Discus Throw (Barcelona)
- 1994 Women's European Championships Discus Throw (Helsinki)
