= Zhao Yonghua =

Chinese discus thrower (born 1969)

Medal record

Women's athletics

Representing China

Asian Championships
Silver medal – second place	1993 Manila	Discus throw

Zhao Yonghua (born 22 January 1969) is a Chinese female former track and field athlete who competed in the discus throw. She holds a personal best of 64.42 m (211 ft 4 in), set in 1993 and which ranked her 13th globally for the season. She was a finalist at the 1991 World Championships in Athletics and the 1988 World Junior Championships in Athletics.

She was runner-up to compatriot Cao Qi at both the 1993 Asian Athletics Championships and the 1993 National Games of China.

== International competitions ==
Year	Competition	Venue	Position	Event	Notes
1988	World Junior Championships	Greater Sudbury, Canada	6th	Discus throw	53.98 m
1991	World Championships	Tokyo, Japan	8th	Discus throw	63.62 m
1993	Asian Championships	Manila, Philippines	2nd	Discus throw	57.78 m
