= Maritza Martén =

Cuban discus thrower (born 1963)

Personal information
- Full name: Maritza Martén García
- Born: August 17, 1963 (age 62) Havana, Cuba
Medal record
Women's athletics
Representing Cuba
Olympic Games
Gold medal – first place	1992 Barcelona	Discus throw
Pan American Games
Gold medal – first place	1983 Caracas	Discus throw
Gold medal – first place	1987 Indianapolis	Discus throw
Gold medal – first place	1995 Mar del Plata	Discus throw
Summer Universiade
Gold medal – first place	1985 Kobe	Discus throw
Bronze medal – third place	1989 Duisburg	Discus throw
Central American and Caribbean Games
Silver medal – second place	1986 Santiago	Discus throw
Silver medal – second place	1993 Ponce	Discus throw

Maritza Martén García (Spanish pronunciation: [maˈɾitsa maɾˈten]; born August 17, 1963) is a retired discus thrower from Cuba who competed in the discus contest at the 1992 Summer Olympics and won the gold medal. She also won the 1987 Pan American Games. Her personal best throw of 70.68 m (231 ft 10 1/2 in) was achieved in 1992.

== International competitions ==
Year	Competition	Venue	Position	Event	Notes
Representing Cuba
1982	Central American and Caribbean Junior; Championships (U-20)	Bridgetown, Barbados	2nd	Shot	14.10 m
1983	Pan American Games	Caracas, Venezuela	1st	Discus	59.62 m
1983	Ibero-American Championships	Barcelona, Spain	1st	Shot put	14.78 m
1983	Ibero-American Championships	Barcelona, Spain	1st	Discus	58.76 m
1984	Friendship Games	Prague, Czechoslovakia	–	Discus	NM
1985	Universiade	Kobe, Japan	1st	Discus	66.66 m
1985	World Cup	Canberra, Australia	3rd	Discus	66.54 m
1986	Central American and Caribbean Games	Santiago, Dominican Republic	2nd	Discus	63.24 m
1987	Pan American Games	Indianapolis, United States	1st	Discus	65.58 m
1987	World Championships	Rome, Italy	9th	Discus	62.00 m
1988	IAAF Grand Prix Final	West Berlin, West Germany	3rd	Discus	
1989	Universiade	Duisburg, West Germany	3rd	Discus	64.70 m
1989	World Cup	Barcelona, Spain	3rd	Discus	65.40 m
1990	Goodwill Games	Seattle, United States	4th	Discus	64.90 m
1991	World Championships	Tokyo, Japan	10th	Discus	62.40 m
1992	Ibero-American Championships	Seville, Spain	1st	Discus	70.68 m
1992	Olympic Games	Barcelona, Spain	1st	Discus	70.06 m
1992	World Cup	Havana, Cuba	1st	Discus	69.30 m
1993	World Championships	Stuttgart, Germany	4th	Discus	64.62 m
1993	Central American and Caribbean Games	Ponce, Puerto Rico	2nd	Discus	59.44 m
1995	Pan American Games	Mar del Plata, Argentina	1st	Discus	61.22 m
1995	World Championships	Gothenburg, Sweden	4th	Discus	64.36 m
1996	Olympic Games	Atlanta, United States	16th	Discus	60.08 m
