= Atanaska Angelova =

Bulgarian discus thrower

Atanaska Stefanova Angelova-Dimitrova (Bulgarian: Атанаска Стефанова Ангелова; born 21 September 1972 in Rousse) is a retired female discus thrower from Bulgaria. She set her personal best (58.94 metres) in the women's discus throw event on 10 August 1995 at the World Championships in Gothenburg, Sweden, where she did not reach the final round. Angelova also competed for her native country at the 1996 Summer Olympics.

== Career ==
Angelova was born in Ruse, Bulgaria and began running in the first grade. After transitioning from sprinting to the discus, she finished third at the Bulgarian championships in her first year of training.

At the 1996 Olympics, Angelova fouled her first two of three attempts in discus qualification. She threw a fair third attempt, but it wasn't far enough to qualify for the finals. She later joked that if someone had told her to move slightly to the left of the sector on her earlier attempts, the Olympic result would have been different.

Following what she described as disappointment from the 1996 Games, Angelova retired from the sport at age 24. She would not return to throwing until 2011, winning the 2011 and 2013 Bulgarian open national championships at age 40 and 42. She also began competing in the athletics pentathlon, winning several medals at the 2013 World Masters Games in Turin.

== Personal life ==
Angelova was married and changed her surname to Angelova-Dimitrova beginning in the 2011 season. She stopped throwing at a high level after 2013, and became a coach. She has two children.

== International competitions ==
Year	Competition	Venue	Position	Notes
Representing Bulgaria
1990	World Junior Championships	Plovdiv, Bulgaria	17th	47.12 m
1994	European Championships	Helsinki, Finland	17th (q)	56.26 m
1996	Olympic Games	Atlanta, United States	17th	59.82 m
