= Valentina Ivanova =

Russian discus thrower

Valentina Ivanova (Russian: Валентина Иванова; born 18 May 1928) is a retired female discus thrower from Russia, who competed in the discus contest at the 1996 Summer Olympics in Atlanta, Georgia. There she ended up in 24th place (58.38 metres). Ivanova set her personal best in the women's discus throw event (65.12 metres) on 2001-01-27 in Pietersburg.

== International competitions ==
Representing Russia
Year	Competition	Venue	Position	Event	Result	Notes
1996	Olympic Games	Atlanta, United States	24th	Discus throw	58.38 m	
