= Stefania Simova =

Bulgarian discus thrower

Personal information
- Nationality: Bulgarian
- Born: 5 June 1963 (age 63)

Sport
- Sport: Athletics
- Event: Discus throw

Stefania Simova (born 5 June 1963) is a Bulgarian athlete. She competed in the women's discus throw at the 1992 Summer Olympics.
