= Ilga Winicov =

American biologist

Ilga Winicov (Born 1935) is a Latvian-Born American biologist and an Elected Fellow of the American Association for the Advancement of Science.

In 2022 Winicov's book about her life experiences, titled Uncharted Journey from Riga, was published. It details her life from growing up in Riga during and after WW2, during which Latvia was occupied by both Nazi Germany and the Soviet Union, to her family leaving to the US during the 1950s and her life thereafter.
