= Xiao Yanling =

Chinese discus thrower (born 1968)

Personal information
- Nationality: Chinese
- Born: April 27, 1968 (age 58)

Achievements and titles
- Personal best: Discus Throw: 71.68 (1992)
Medal record
Women's athletics
Representing China
Asian Championships
Bronze medal – third place	1998 Fukuoka	Discus throw
East Asian Games
Gold medal – first place	1997 Busan	Discus throw
Universiade
Gold medal – first place	1991 Sheffield	Discus throw

Xiao Yanling
- Traditional Chinese: 蕭艷玲
- Simplified Chinese: 萧艳玲
Transcriptions
Standard Mandarin
- Hanyu Pinyin: Xiāo Yànlíng
- Wade–Giles: Hsiao Yenling
Yue: Cantonese
- Yale Romanization: Syau1 Yan4ling2
- Jyutping: Siu1 Jim6ling4

Xiao Yanling (simplified Chinese: 萧艳玲; traditional Chinese: 蕭艷玲; pinyin: Xiāo Yànlíng; born 27 April 1968) is a Chinese discus thrower. Her personal best throw was 71.68 metres, achieved in March 1992 in Beijing. This is the current Asian record. She failed a drug test in 1992.

She won the gold medal at the 1991 Summer Universiade and the bronze medal at the 1998 Asian Championships.

== Achievements ==
Year	Competition	Venue	Position	Notes
Representing China
1997	East Asian Games	Busan, South Korea	1st	63.82 m
1998	Asian Championships	Fukuoka, Japan	3rd	53.32 m
1991	World Championships	Tokyo, Japan	11th	61.20 m

Sporting positions
Preceded by (Bulgaria) Tsvetanka Khristova	Women's Discus Best Year Performance; 1992	Succeeded by (Russia) Larisa Korotkevich
Preceded by (Germany) Ilke Wyludda	Women's Discus Best Year Performance; 1997	Succeeded by (Germany) Franka Dietzsch
