= Ilga Bērtulsone =

Latvian discus thrower

Personal information
- Full name: Ilga Bērtulsone-Šmeikste
- Nationality: Latvian
- Born: 10 January 1966 (age 60) Preiļi, Preiļu novads, Latvian SSR, Soviet Union
- Height: 177 cm (5 ft 10 in)
- Weight: 92 kg (203 lb)

Sport
- Sport: Athletics
- Event: Discus throw

Ilga Bērtulsone (born 10 January 1966) is a Latvian athlete. She competed in the women's discus throw at the 1992 Summer Olympics.
