= Cristina Boiț =

Romanian discus thrower

Cristina Boiţ (born 14 May 1968 in Bucharest) is a retired discus thrower from Romania. She set her personal best (64.58 metres) in the women's discus throw event in 1988. Boiţ competed for her native country at two Summer Olympics: 1992 and 1996.

== Achievements ==
Year	Competition	Venue	Position	Notes
Representing Romania
1996	Olympic Games	Atlanta, United States	27th	58.10 m
