= Jana Lauren =

German discus thrower

Jana Lauren (born 28 June 1970) is a retired German discus thrower.

She won the silver medal at the 1989 European Junior Championships, representing East Germany, and finished sixth at the 1994 European Championships. She competed at the 1995 World Championships, but did not progress from the qualification round.

Her personal best throw was 66.30 metres, achieved in June 1989 in Karl-Marx-Stadt.
