= Melissa Weis =

American discus thrower (born 1971)

Personal information
- Born: May 22, 1971 (age 55) Bakersfield, California, United States

Sport
- Sport: Track and field

Melissa Weis (born May 22, 1971) is a retired female discus thrower from the United States. She set her personal best (57.34 metres) in the women's discus throw event on August 10, 1995 at the World Championships in Gothenburg, Sweden, where she didn't reach the final round.

While at Bakersfield High School in Bakersfield, California, Weiss set the NFHS national high school record in the discus throw at 176' 10" which stood for three years until it was beaten by Suzy Powell. She also won the CIF California State Meet three years in a row, 1988-1990 and added the shot put title in 1989. Her teammate Dawn Dumble was her closest competition all four years, taking the titles Weiss missed.
