= Qiu Qiaoping =

Chinese discus thrower (born 1971)

Personal information
- Nationality: Chinese
- Born: 31 October 1971 (age 54)

Sport
- Sport: Athletics
- Event: Discus throw
Medal record
Representing China
Summer Universiade
Silver medal – second place	1991 Sheffield	Discus throw

Qiu Qiaoping (born 31 October 1971) is a Chinese athlete. She competed in the women's discus throw at the 1992 Summer Olympics.
