= Olga Chernyavskaya =

Russian discus thrower (born 1963)

Personal information
- Native name: Ольга Михайловна Чернявская
- Full name: Olga Mikhailovna Chernyavskaya
- Nationality: Russian
- Born: Olga Mikhailovna Davydova; 17 September 1963 (age 63) Irbit, Russian SFSR, Soviet Union
- Height: 180 cm (5 ft 11 in)
- Weight: 80 kg (176 lb)

Sport
- Country: Soviet Union (1990–1991); Unified Team (1992); Russia (1993–2004)
- Sport: Women's athletics
- Event: Discus throw

Achievements and titles
- Personal best: 68.38 m (1992)
Medal record
Women's athletics
Representing Russia
World Championships
Gold medal – first place	1993 Stuttgart	Discus
Bronze medal – third place	1995 Gothenburg	Discus
Representing Soviet Union
European Championships
Silver medal – second place	1990 Split	Discus

Olga Mikhailovna Chernyavskaya, née Davydova, formerly Burova (Russian: Ольга Михайповна Чернявская; born 17 September 1963) is a Russian discus thrower. As Olga Burova, she won the gold medal at the 1993 World Championships. She also won European Championships silver in 1990, World Championship bronze in 1995, and is a three-time Olympian.

== Career ==
Born in Irbit, she finished fifth at the 1989 World Cup competing as Olga Davydova for the Soviet Union, before going on to win the gold medal at the 1993 World Championships in Stuttgart competing as Olga Burova for Russia. Her best Olympic performance is 5th place in 1992. She also participated in the Olympics in 1996 and 2004. Her personal best is 68.38m, achieved in 1992.

Chernyavskaya beat the official Masters W50 discus world record while winning the 2015 World Masters Athletics Championships in Lyon, France.

== International competitions ==
Year	Competition	Venue	Position	Event	Notes
Representing Soviet Union
1989	World Cup	Barcelona, Spain	5th	Discus	61.46 m
1990	Goodwill Games	Seattle, United States	3rd	Discus	65.46 m
1990	European Championships	Split, Yugoslavia	2nd	Discus	66.72 m
Representing Unified Team
1992	Olympic Games	Barcelona, Spain	5th	Discus	64.02 m
Representing Russia
1993	World Championships	Stuttgart, Germany	1st	Discus	67.40 m
1994	European Championships	Helsinki, Finland	5th	Discus	62.54 m
1995	World Championships	Gothenburg, Sweden	3rd	Discus	66.86 m
1996	Olympic Games	Atlanta, United States	6th	Discus	64.70 m
2004	Olympic Games	Athens, Greece	20th (q)	Discus	58.64 m
(q) Indicates overall position in qualifying round

== See also ==
- List of World Athletics Championships medalists (women)
- List of European Athletics Championships medalists (women)
- Discus throw at the World Championships in Athletics

== General references ==
- Olga Chernyavskaya at World Athletics
- Olga Chernyavskaya at Olympedia
