= Min Chunfeng =

Chinese discus thrower (born 1969)

Medal record

Women's athletics

Asian Championships
Gold medal – first place	1991 Kuala Lumpur	Discus throw
Silver medal – second place	1991 Kuala Lumpur	Shot put

Min Chunfeng (Chinese: 闵春风; born 17 March 1969) is a retired female discus thrower from the People's Republic of China.

== International competitions ==
Representing China
Year	Competition	Venue	Position	Event	Notes
1986	World Junior Championships	Athens, Greece	3rd	Discus	54.00 m
1988	World Junior Championships	Sudbury, Canada	4th	Discus	56.90 m
1991	World Championships	Tokyo, Japan	6th	Discus	65.56 m
1991	Asian Championships	Kuala Lumpur, Malaysia	1st	Discus	61.74 m
1991	Asian Championships	Kuala Lumpur, Malaysia	2nd	Shot put	16.91 m
1992	Olympic Games	Barcelona, Spain	11th	Discus	60.82 m
1992	World Cup	Habana, Cuba	3rd	Discus	65.26 m
1993	World Championships	Stuttgart, Germany	3rd	Discus	65.26 m
1993	East Asian Games	Shanghai, China	1st	Discus	63.12 m
1994	Asian Games	Hiroshima, Japan	1st	Discus	62.52 m

== See also ==
- China at the World Championships in Athletics
