= Tsvetanka Khristova =

Bulgarian discus thrower (1962–2008)

Personal information
- Native name: Цветанка Павлова Христова
- Full name: Tsvetanka Pavlova Khristova
- Born: 14 March 1962 Kazanlak, Bulgaria
- Died: 14 November 2008 (aged 46)
- Height: 1.75 m (5 ft 9 in)
- Weight: 85 kg (187 lb)

Sport
- Sport: Athletics
- Event: Discus throw

Achievements and titles
- Personal best: 73.22 m (1987)
Medal record
Women's athletics
Representing Bulgaria
Olympic Games
Silver medal – second place	1992 Barcelona	Discus
Bronze medal – third place	1988 Seoul	Discus
World Championships
Gold medal – first place	1991 Tokyo	Discus
Bronze medal – third place	1987 Rome	Discus
European Championships
Gold medal – first place	1982 Athens	Discus
Silver medal – second place	1986 Stuttgart	Discus
Universiade
Gold medal – first place	1987 Zagreb	Discus throw
Silver medal – second place	1985 Kobe	Discus throw

Tsvetanka Pavlova Khristova (Bulgarian: Цветанка Павлова Христова) (sometimes spelled Tsvetanka Hristova, 14 March 1962 – 14 November 2008) was a Bulgarian discus thrower. She won gold at the 1991 World Championships and the 1982 European Championships. She also won two Olympic medals, with bronze at the 1988 Seoul Olympics and silver at the 1992 Barcelona Olympics. Her best throw of 73.22 metres in 1987, ranks her eighth on the world all-time list.

== Life ==
Born in Kazanlak, Stara Zagora, she became European champion in 1982 at only 20 years of age. Nine years later she won the World Championships, and the following year won an Olympic silver medal. Khristova tested positive for steroids in 1993 and was banned from competition. In 2004, at the age of 42, she competed at the 2004 Summer Olympics.

Her personal best was 73.22 m. That is still the Bulgarian record.

She died on 14 November 2008, of cancer.

== International competitions ==
Year	Competition	Venue	Position	Event	Notes
Representing Bulgaria
1982	European Championships	Athens, Greece	1st	Discus	68.34 m
1983	World Championships	Helsinki, Finland	4th	Discus	65.62 m
1985	World Student Games (Universiade)	Kobe, Japan	2nd	Discus	65.30 m
1986	Goodwill Games	Moscow, Soviet Union	1st	Discus	69.54 m
1986	European Championships	Stuttgart, West Germany	2nd	Discus	69.52 m
1987	World Student Games (Universiade)	Zagreb, Yugoslavia	1st	Discus	67.96 m (record)
1987	World Championships	Rome, Italy	3rd	Discus	68.82 m
1988	Olympic Games	Seoul, South Korea	3rd	Discus	69.74 m
1990	European Championships	Split, Yugoslavia	10th	Discus	56.30 m
1991	World Championships	Tokyo, Japan	1st	Discus	71.02 m
1992	Olympic Games	Barcelona, Spain	2nd	Discus	67.78 m
1997	World Championships	Athens, Greece	23rd (q)	Discus	53.64 m
2004	Olympic Games	Athens, Greece	41st (q)	Discus	43.25 m

Sporting positions
Preceded by (Germany) Ilke Wyludda	Women's Discus Best Year Performance; 1991	Succeeded by (China) Xiao Yanling
