= Jacqueline Goormachtigh =

Dutch discus thrower

Romane Jacqueline Elisabeth Goormachtigh (born 28 February 1970 in Dordrecht, South Holland) is a retired discus thrower from the Netherlands, who represented her native country at the 1996 Summer Olympics in Atlanta, United States. There she did not reach the final, after having thrown 58.74 metres in the qualifying heats. She was named Rotterdam Sportswoman of the Year in 1993.

Her daughter Alida van Daalen took part in the discus throw at the 2024 Summer Olympics.

== Statistics ==
Information based on her World Athletics profile unless noted otherwise.

=== Personal bests ===
Outdoor

- Shot put: 17.77 m (Vught, 1993)
- Discus throw: 63.86 (Lisse, 1998)

Indoor

- Shot put: 17.24 m i (Den Haag, 1993)

== Achievements ==
Year	Competition	Venue	Position	Notes
Representing the Netherlands
1994	European Championships	Helsinki, Finland	19th (q)	54.82 m
1996	Olympic Games	Atlanta, United States	21st	58.74 m

Awards
Preceded by Petra Kamstra	Rotterdam Sportswoman of the Year; 1993	Succeeded by None
