= Franka Dietzsch =

German discus thrower

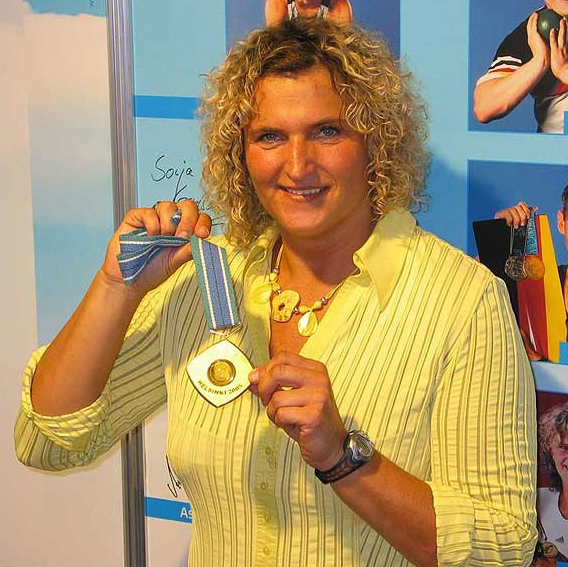
- Dietzsch in 2005

Personal information
- Nationality: German
- Born: January 22, 1968 (age 58) Wolgast, Mecklenburg-Vorpommern, East Germany
- Height: 1.83 m (6 ft 0 in)
- Weight: 82 kg (181 lb)

Sport
- Country: East Germany; Germany
- Sport: Athletics
- Event: Discus throw
- Club: SC Empor Rostock; SC Neubrandenburg

Achievements and titles
- Personal best: 69.51 m (1999)
Medal record
Women's athletics
Representing Germany
World Championships
Gold medal – first place	1999 Seville	Discus
Gold medal – first place	2005 Helsinki	Discus
Gold medal – first place	2007 Osaka	Discus
European Championships
Gold medal – first place	1998 Budapest	Discus
Silver medal – second place	2006 Gothenburg	Discus

Franka Dietzsch (born 22 January 1968) is a German former discus thrower best known for winning gold medals at three World Championships in Athletics. She won the 1998 European Championships and 1999 World Championships, but did not return to the international podium until her win at the 2005 World Championships.

At the age of 39 she won her third world championship title in 2007 in Osaka. After spending a year away from the field due to health problems, she returned to competition at the Wiesbaden meet. She finished in second place with 61.49 metres, remaining focused on defending her discus World Champion at the 2009 World Championships, at which she finished 23rd at 58.44 metres, failing to qualify for the final. She retired the same year as one of the few remaining athletes to have represented East Germany internationally.

Her personal best throw is 69.51 metres, achieved in May 1999 in Wiesbaden. This result ranks her ninth among German discus throwers, behind Gabriele Reinsch, Ilke Wyludda, Diana Gansky-Sachse, Irina Meszynski, Gisela Beyer, Martina Hellmann-Opitz, Evelin Jahl and Silvia Madetzky.

== Achievements ==
Year	Competition	Venue	Position	Notes
Representing East Germany
1986	World Junior Championships	Athens, Greece	2nd	60.26 m
Representing Germany
1993	World Championships	Stuttgart, Germany	8th	62.06 m
1994	European Championships	Helsinki, Finland	9th	59.18 m
1995	World Championships	Gothenburg, Sweden	7th	61.28 m
1996	Summer Olympics	Atlanta, United States	4th	65.48 m
1998	European Championships	Budapest, Hungary	1st	67.49 m
1998	IAAF World Cup	Johannesburg, South Africa	1st	67.07 m
1999	World Championships	Seville, Spain	1st	68.14 m
2000	Olympic Games	Sydney, Australia	6th	63.18 m
2001	World Championships	Edmonton, Canada	4th	65.38 m
2003	World Athletics Final	Monte Carlo, Monaco	6th	61.88 m
2004	World Athletics Final	Monte Carlo, Monaco	6th	61.48 m
2005	World Championships	Helsinki, Finland	1st	66.56 m
2005	World Athletics Final	Monte Carlo, Monaco	2nd	61.91 m
2006	European Championships	Gothenburg, Sweden	2nd	64.35 m
2006	World Athletics Final	Stuttgart, Germany	1st	64.73 m
2006	IAAF World Cup	Athens, Greece	1st	66.07 m
2007	World Championships	Osaka, Japan	1st	66.61 m

Sporting positions
Preceded by (China) Xiao Yanling	Women's Discus Best Year Performance; 1998	Succeeded by (Russia) Natalya Sadova
Preceded by (Czech Republic) Vera Pospíšilová	Women's Discus Best Year Performance; 2006–2007	Succeeded by (Belarus) Iryna Yatchenko
