= Ellina Zvereva =

Belarusian discus thrower (born 1960)

Personal information
- Native name: Эліна Зверава
- Full name: Ellina Aleksandrovna Zvereva
- Nationality: Soviet; Belarusian
- Born: 16 November 1960 (age 65) Dolgoprudny, Russian SFSR, Soviet Union
- Height: 1.83 m (6 ft 0 in)
- Weight: 100 kg (220 lb)

Sport
- Country: Soviet Union (1984–1991); Belarus (1993–2009)
- Sport: Athletics
- Event: Discus throw

Achievements and titles
- Personal best: 71.58 m (1988)
Medal record
Women's athletics
Representing Belarus
Olympic Games
Gold medal – first place	2000 Sydney	Discus
Bronze medal – third place	1996 Atlanta	Discus
World Championships
Gold medal – first place	1995 Gothenburg	Discus
Gold medal – first place	2001 Edmonton	Discus
Silver medal – second place	1997 Athens	Discus
European Championships
Silver medal – second place	1994 Helsinki	Discus

Ellina Aleksandrovna Zvereva (Belarusian: Эліна Зверава; born 16 November 1960 in Dolgoprudny) is a Belarusian former discus thrower best known for winning the gold medal at the 2000 Summer Olympics. She became world champion in 1995, and again in 2001 after the disqualification of Natalya Sadova. Her victory in 2001 made her the oldest World Champion ever, at 40 years and 269 days.

Her personal best is 71.58m. When she retired in 2010 she was one of the last remaining athletes who had competed for the Soviet Union.

== Early life ==
Zvereva was born on November 16, 1960, in the Tula, Russia.

== Doping ==
In 1992 she tested positive for anabolic steroids.

== Achievements ==
Year	Competition	Venue	Position	Notes
Representing the Soviet Union
1988	Olympic Games	Seoul, South Korea	5th	68.94 m
1990	European Championships	Split, Yugoslavia	6th	63.88 m
1991	World Championships	Tokyo, Japan	9th	63.22 m
Representing Belarus
1994	European Championships	Helsinki, Finland	2nd	64.46 m
1995	World Championships	Gothenburg, Sweden	1st	68.64 m
1996	Summer Olympics	Atlanta, United States	3rd	65.64 m
1996	IAAF Grand Prix Final	Milan, Italy	2nd	64.66 m
1997	World Championships	Athens, Greece	2nd	65.90 m
1998	European Championships	Budapest, Hungary	4th	65.92 m
2000	Summer Olympics	Sydney, Australia	1st	68.40 m
2000	IAAF Grand Prix Final	Doha, U.A.E.	2nd	63.96 m
2001	World Championships	Edmonton, Canada	1st	67.10 m
2002	IAAF Grand Prix Final	Paris, France	3rd	63.28 m
2006	European Championships	Gothenburg, Sweden	6th	61.72 m
2008	Summer Olympics	Beijing, China	6th	60.82 m

== See also ==
- List of sportspeople sanctioned for doping offences
