= Daniela Costian =

Australian discus thrower

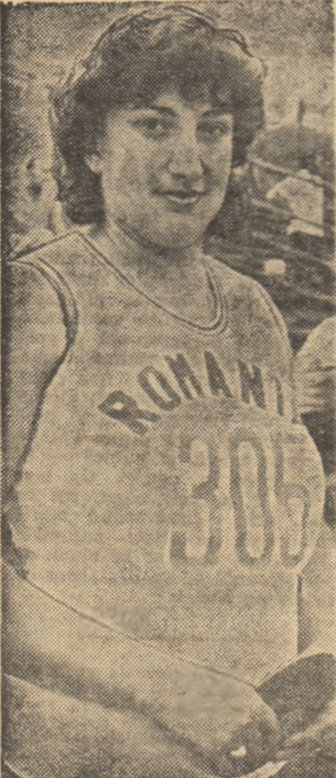

Personal information
- Nationality: Romanian (until 1991); Australian (after 1991)
- Born: 30 April 1965 (age 61) Brăila, Romania
- Years active: 1984-2000
- Height: 182 cm (6 ft 0 in)
- Weight: 83 kg (183 lb)

Sport
- Country: Romania; Australia
- Sport: Athletics
- Event: Discus throw
- Turned pro: 1984
- Retired: 2000

Achievements and titles
- Personal best: 73.84 m (1988)
Medal record
Women's Athletics
Representing Australia
Olympic Games
Bronze medal – third place	1992 Barcelona	Discus throw
World Championships
Silver medal – second place	1993 Stuttgart	Discus throw
Commonwealth Games
Gold medal – first place	1994 Victoria	Discus throw
Representing Romania
Summer Universiade
Bronze medal – third place	1985 Kobe	Discus throw

Daniela Costian (born 30 April 1965) is a former Olympic discus thrower. She was born in Brăila, Romania, but became an Australian citizen in 1990. She competed in the discus contest at the 1992 Summer Olympics and won the bronze medal. She won a silver medal at the 1993 World Championships in Athletics.

Her personal best throw reached a distance of 73.84 m. Set in 1988, it was a Romanian record. Her best result achieved for Australia was 68.72 metres in 1994. This was both the Australian and the Oceanian record for 23 years until it was broken by Dani Stevens in August 2017.

== Achievements ==
Year	Competition	Venue	Position	Event	Notes
Representing Australia
1992	Olympic Games	Barcelona, Spain	3rd	Discus	66.24 m
1996	Olympic Games	Atlanta, United States	14th	Discus	61.66 m

Sporting positions
Preceded by (Russia) Larisa Korotkevich	Women's Discus Best Year Performance alongside (Germany) Ilke Wyludda; 1994	Succeeded by (Norway) Mette Bergmann
