= Mette Bergmann =

Norwegian discus thrower

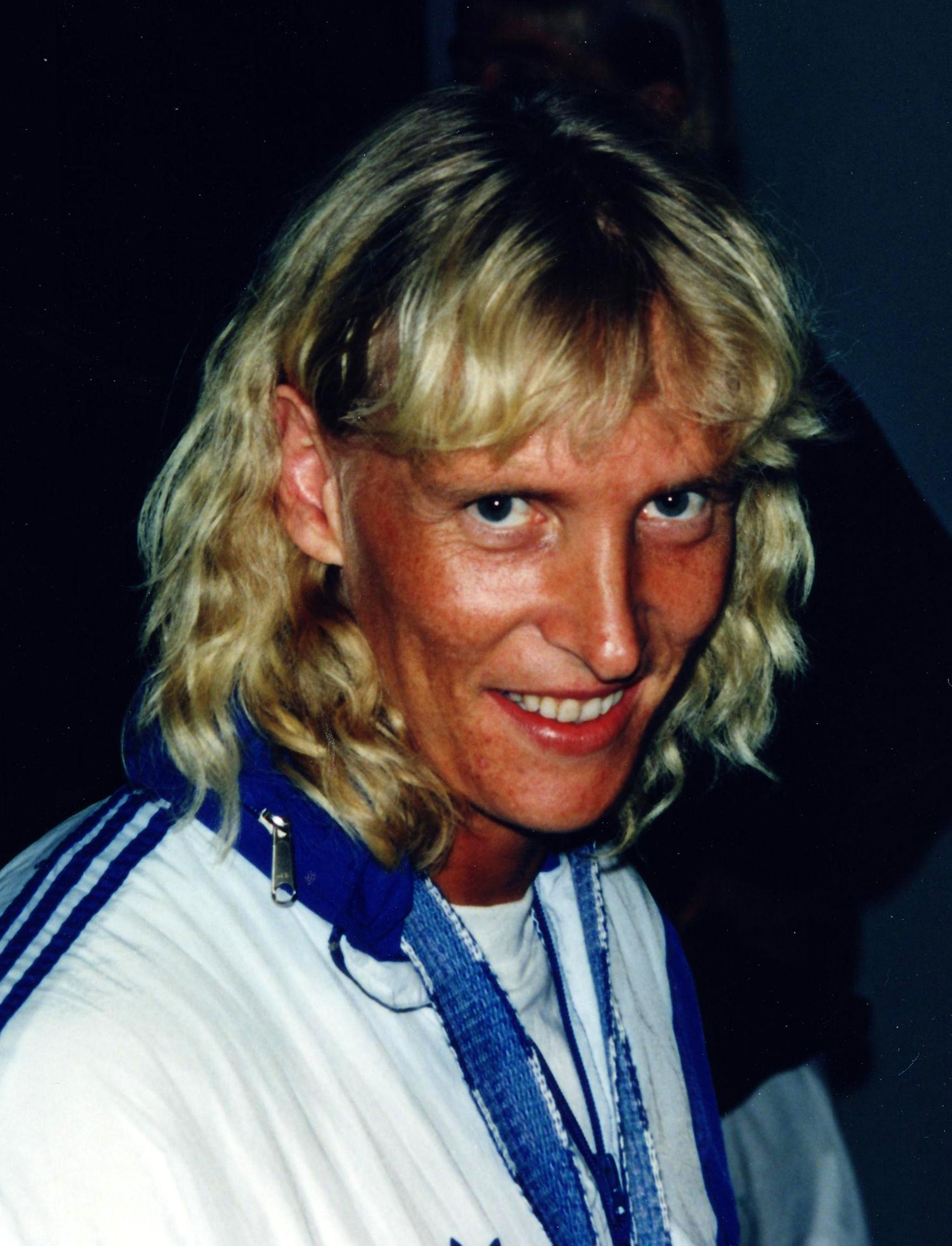
- Bergmann in 1994

Medal record

Women's athletics

Representing Norway

European Championships
Bronze medal – third place	1994 Helsinki	Discus throw

Mette Bergmann (born 9 November 1962 in Kråkerøy) is a retired discus thrower from Kråkerøy, Norway. Her personal best throw was 69.68 metres, achieved in May 1995 in Florø. This is the current Norwegian record.

She represented the clubs Fredrikstad IF and SK Vidar.

== Achievements ==
Year	Competition	Venue	Position	Event	Notes
Representing Norway
1986	European Championships	Stuttgart, West Germany	11th	Discus	53.58 m
1990	European Championships	Split, Yugoslavia	11th (q)	Discus	55.58 m
1994	European Championships	Helsinki, Finland	3rd	Discus	64.34 m
1995	World Championships	Gothenburg, Sweden	6th	Discus	62.48 m
1996	Olympic Games	Atlanta, United States	9th	Discus	62.28 m

== Notes ==
Sporting positions
Preceded by (Germany) Ilke Wyludda (Australia) Daniela Costian	Women's Discus Best Year Performance; 1995	Succeeded by (Germany) Ilke Wyludda
