= Lyudmila Filimonova =

Belarusian discus thrower

Personal information
- Born: 22 March 1971 (age 55) Brest, Belarus

Sport
- Sport: Track and field

Lyudmila Filimonova (Belarusian: Людміла Філімонава; born 22 March 1971) is a retired Belarusian discus thrower. Her personal best throw was 64.44 metres, achieved in May 1998 in Minsk.

She finished eighth at the 1994 European Championships in Helsinki and the 1995 World Championships in Gothenburg.

== Achievements ==
Year	Competition	Venue	Position	Notes
Representing the Soviet Union
1990	World Junior Championships	Plovdiv, Bulgaria	5th	53.20 m
Representing Belarus
1994	European Championships	Helsinki, Finland	8th	59.46 m
1996	Olympic Games	Atlanta, United States	38th	53.30 m
