= Anja Möllenbeck =

German discus thrower

Personal information
- Born: 18 March 1972 (age 54) Frankenberg, Saxony, East Germany

Sport
- Sport: Track and field
Medal record
Representing Germany
Summer Universiade
Silver medal – second place	1995 Fukuoka	Discus throw
Bronze medal – third place	1993 Buffalo	Discus throw

Anja Möllenbeck (née Gündler; born 18 March 1972) is a retired German discus thrower, whose personal best throw is 64.63 metres, achieved in May 1998 in Obersuhl.

She married fellow discus thrower Michael Möllenbeck in 1996.

== Achievements ==
Year	Competition	Venue	Position	Event	Notes
Representing East Germany
1990	World Junior Championships	Plovdiv, Bulgaria	3rd	Discus	59.30 m
Representing Germany
1991	European Junior Championships	Thessaloniki, Greece	1st	Shot put	16.80 m
1991	European Junior Championships	Thessaloniki, Greece	1st	Discus	60.38 m
1993	World Championships	Stuttgart, Germany	5th	Discus	62.92 m
1993	Summer Universiade	Buffalo, United States	3rd	Discus	60.56 m
1995	Summer Universiade	Fukuoka, Japan	2nd	Discus	60.78 m
1996	Olympic Games	Atlanta, United States	11th	Discus	61.16 m
1999	World Championships	Seville, Spain	12th	Discus	59.48 m
2001	World Championships	Edmonton, Canada	8th	Discus	60.49 m
