= Ilke Wyludda =

German athlete (1969–2024)

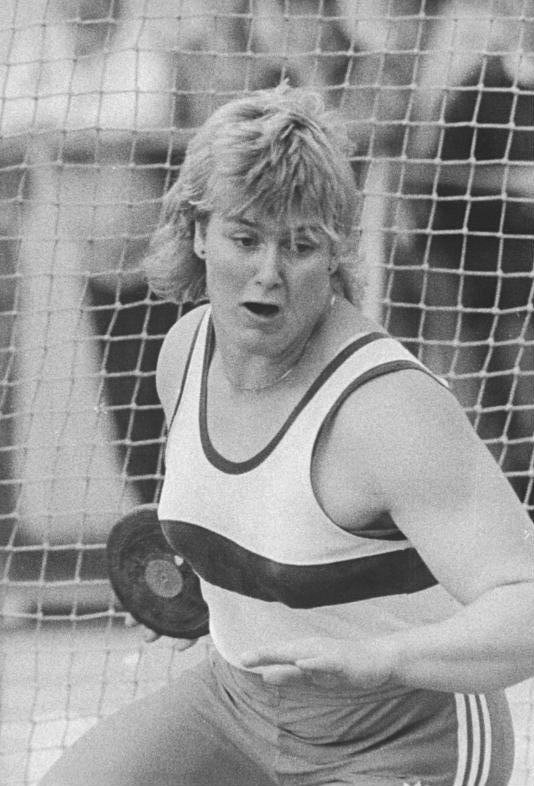
- Wyludda in 1988

Personal information
- Born: 28 March 1969 Leipzig, East Germany
- Died: 1 December 2024 (aged 55) Halle, Saxony-Anhalt, Germany
- Height: 1.84 m (6 ft 0 in)
- Weight: 95 kg (209 lb)

Sport
- Country: East Germany (1984–1990); Germany (1991–2000)
- Sport: Track and field
- Event: Discus throw
- Club: SC Chemie Halle; LAC Chemnitz

Achievements and titles
- Personal best: 74.56 (1989)
Medal record
Women's Athletics
Olympic Games
Gold medal – first place	1996 Atlanta	Discus
World Championships
Silver medal – second place	1991 Tokyo	Discus
Silver medal – second place	1995 Gothenburg	Discus
European Championships
Gold medal – first place	1994 Helsinki	Discus
Representing East Germany
European Championships
Gold medal – first place	1990 Split	Discus

Ilke Wyludda (28 March 1969 – 1 December 2024) was a German discus thrower, former Olympic champion.

== Career ==
Wyludda set eleven junior records at discus throw (and also two at shot put), and became junior world champion. Between 1989 and 1991 she recorded 41 successive wins until beaten by Tsvetanka Khristova at the 1991 World Championships. Wyludda never won the world championships, but she became Olympic champion in 1996.

In early January 2011 Wyludda revealed in Bild that she had to have her right leg amputated because of sepsis. After losing her leg she returned to athletics and began entering para-sport competitions. In 2012, she represented Germany at the London Paralympics becoming the first German athlete to have represented her country at both Olympic and Paralympic Games. In 2014, she entered the IPC European Championships in Swansea, taking the bronze medal in the F57 discus and silver in the shot put.

Ilke Wyludda died in Halle on 1 December 2024, at the age of 55.

== Personal bests ==
- Discus throw – 74.56 (1989)
- Discus throw U23 – 74.56 (1989) WU23B
- Discus throw Junior – 74.40 (1988) WJB
- Discus throw Youth – 65.86 (1986) WYB
- Shot put – 20.23 (1988)
- Shot put U23 – 20.23 (1988)
- Shot put Junior – 20.23 (1988)
- Shot put Youth – 19.08 (1986) WYB

== International competitions ==
Year	Competition	Venue	Position	Event	Notes
Representing East Germany
1986	World Junior Championships	Athens, Greece	1st	Discus	64.02 m
1987	World Championships	Rome, Italy	4th	Discus	68.20 m
1988	World Junior Championships	Sudbury, Ontario, Canada	1st	Discus	68.24 m
1989	IAAF World Cup	Barcelona, Spain	1st	Discus	71.54 m
1990	Goodwill Games	Seattle, United States	1st	Discus	68.08 m
1990	European Championships	Split, Yugoslavia	1st	Discus	68.46 m
Representing Germany
1991	World Championships	Tokyo, Japan	2nd	Discus	69.12 m
1992	Olympic Games	Barcelona, Spain	9th	Discus	62.16 m
1994	European Championships	Helsinki, Finland	1st	Discus	68.72 m
1994	IAAF World Cup	London, United Kingdom	1st	Discus	65.30 m
1995	World Championships	Gothenburg, Sweden	2nd	Discus	67.20 m
1996	Olympic Games	Atlanta, United States	1st	Discus	69.66 m
1996	IAAF Grand Prix Final	Milan, Italy	1st	Discus	64.74 m
2000	Olympic Games	Sydney, Australia	7th	Discus	63.16 m

Achievements
Preceded by Gabriele Reinsch; Larisa Korotkevich; Mette Bergmann	Women's Discus Best Year Performance; 1989–1990; 1994; 1996	Succeeded by Tsvetanka Khristova; Mette Bergmann; Xiao Yanling
