= Manuela Tîrneci =

Romanian athlete

Personal information
- Nationality: Romanian
- Born: 26 February 1969 (age 57)

Sport
- Sport: Athletics
- Event: Discus throw

Manuela Tîrneci (born 26 February 1969) is a Romanian athlete. She competed in the women's discus throw at the 1992 Summer Olympics.
