= 1995 African Junior Athletics Championships =

2nd African Junior Championships
- Dates: 20 – 22 July
- Host city: Bouaké, Ivory Coast
- Level: Under-20
- Events: 36

The 1995 African Junior Athletics Championships was the second edition of the biennial, continental athletics tournament for African athletes aged 19 years or younger. It was held in Bouaké, Ivory Coast, from 20–22 July. A total of 36 events were contested, 19 by men and 17 by women.

Agnes Afiyo of Ghana, the runner-up in the women's javelin throw, was determined to be male in 1999 following medical testing. It is not known whether the medals from this competition were reassigned as a result.

== Medal table ==
* Host nation (Ivory Coast)

Rank	NOC	Gold	Silver	Bronze	Total
1	Nigeria (NGR)	12	9	1	22
2	Kenya (KEN)	10	6	2	18
3	Ivory Coast (CIV)	3	1	8	12
4	Algeria (ALG)	3	1	5	9
5	Egypt (EGY)	3	0	2	5
6	Ghana (GHA)	2	7	5	14
7	Tunisia (TUN)	1	0	1	2
7	Zimbabwe (ZIM)	1	0	1	2
9	Togo (TOG)	1	0	0	1
10	Morocco (MAR)	0	5	6	11
11	Burkina Faso (BUR)	0	4	2	6
12	Botswana (BOT)	0	2	0	2
13	Zaire (ZAI)	0	1	0	1
14	Gambia (GAM)	0	0	1	1
14	Mali (MLI)	0	0	1	1
Totals (15 entries)		36	36	35	107

== Medal summary ==
=== Men ===
Event	Gold		Silver		Bronze	
100 metres	Ibrahim Meité (CIV)	10.32	Sunday Emmanuel (NGR)	10.42	Abu Duah (GHA)	10.67
200 metres	Ibrahim Meité (CIV)	20.76	Sunday Emmanuel (NGR)	20.98	Ahmed Douhou (CIV)	21.08
400 metres	Hyginus Anugho (NGR)	47.91	Lulu Basinyi (BOT)	48.14	Iddrisu Umar (GHA)	48.20
800 metres	Japheth Kimutai (KEN)	1:47.67	Khalifa Boutahri (MAR)	1:48.79	Abraham Kibet (KEN)	1:50.32
1500 metres	Japheth Kimutai (KEN)	3:49.78	Khalifa Boutahri (MAR)	3:52.44	Abraham Kibet (KEN)	3:54.10
5000 metres	Charles Kwambai (KEN)	14:15.12	Mark Bett (KEN)	14:15.38	Mohammed Amyn (MAR)	14:15.49
10,000 metres	Charles Kwambai (KEN)	29:43.05	Mark Bett (KEN)	29:44.08	Mohamed El-Hattab (MAR)	30:34.80
110 metres hurdles	William Mene (NGR)	14.58	Djeke Mambo (ZAI)	14.88	Severin Guede (CIV)	16.18
400 metres hurdles	Osita Okeagu (NGR)	51.83	Faycal Kacemi (MAR)	52.60	Hassan Qormassi (MAR)	52.77
3000 metres steeplechase	Charles Kwambai (KEN)	9:05.83	Mark Bett (KEN)	9:08.82	Laïd Bessou (ALG)	9:20.30
4×100 m relay	Ivory Coast (CIV); Yves Sonan; Ahmed Douhou; Ade Bayo; Ibrahim Meité	39.51	Ghana (GHA)	39.99	Nigeria (NGR)	40.51
4×400 m relay	Nigeria (NGR); Joel Okunorobo; Osita Okeagu; Oluwasegun; Hyginus Anugho	3:12.79	Botswana (BOT)	3:14.03	Ivory Coast (CIV)	3:16.76
High jump	Abderrahmane Hammad (ALG)	2.12 m	Olivier Sanou (BUR)	2.09 m	Oumar Soulaké (MLI)	2.06 m
Pole vault	Mohamed Benyahia (ALG)	4.60 m	Adjei Mensah (GHA)	4.10 m	Only two athletes cleared a height	
Long jump	Téko Folligan (TOG)	7.55 m	Mehdi El-Ghazouani (MAR)	7.24 m	Pa Momodou Gai (GAM)	7.17 m
Triple jump	Kenneth Andam (GHA)	15.63 m	Olivier Sanou (BUR)	15.56 m	Karim Ould Ahmed (ALG)	15.54 m
Shot put	Walid Jamil Mustapha (EGY)	14.87 m	Samson Ahmadu (NGR)	14.77 m	Gerald Cudjoe (GHA)	14.17 m
Discus throw	Walid Jamil Mustapha (EGY)	48.34 m	Samson Ahmadu (NGR)	47.04 m	Tarek Yazidi (TUN)	45.88 m
Javelin throw	Roland Vermeulen (ZIM)	62.08 m	Richard Agyepong (GHA)	55.52 m	Zakaria Abou Saoud (EGY)	53.24 m

=== Women ===
Event	Gold		Silver		Bronze	
100 metres	Mercy Nku (NGR)	11.38	Gloria Kemasuode (NGR)	11.94	Saliha Hammadi (ALG)	12.00
200 metres	Mercy Nku (NGR)	23.63	Vida Nsiah (GHA)	24.24	Naomi Mills (GHA)	24.53
400 metres	Florence Ekpo-Umoh (NGR)	54.48	Agnes Nuamah (GHA)	56.40	Nahida Touhami (ALG)	57.43
800 metres	Nancy Jebet Langat (KEN)	2:11.69	Elizabeth Akpan (NGR)	2:14.60	Djeneba Silue (CIV)	2:15.62
1500 metres	Hellen Jemaiyo Kimutai (KEN)	4:20.46	Nancy Langat (KEN)	4:23.35	Bouchra Ben Thami (MAR)	4:25.68
3000 metres	Hellen Jemaiyo Kimutai (KEN)	9:15.68	Joan Jepkorir Aiyabei (KEN)	9:29.94	Bouchra Ben Thami (MAR)	9:44.14
10,000 metres	Joan Jepkorir Aiyabei (KEN)	34:40.61	Elizabeth Ewoi (KEN)	35:21.53	Esther Nherera (ZIM)	38:11.34
100 metres hurdles	Vida Nsiah (GHA)	13.77	Glory Alozie (NGR)	14.21	Ahlam Allali (ALG)	15.08
400 metres hurdles	Beatrice Biwott (KEN)	62.54	Zahra Lachgar (MAR)	63.16	Juliette Kaboré (BUR)	63.18
4×100 m relay	Nigeria (NGR)	45.91	Ghana (GHA)	46.40	Ivory Coast (CIV)	48.31
4×400 m relay	Nigeria (NGR)	3:47.76	Algeria (ALG)	3:50.94	Ivory Coast (CIV)	3:56.69
High jump	Nkechinyere Mbaoma (NGR)	1.73 m	Irène Tiéndrebeogo (BUR)	1.73 m	Jeannine Ble (CIV)	1.65 m
Long jump	Chinedu Odozor (NGR)	5.92 m	Gloria Kemasuode (NGR)	5.80 m	Vida Nsiah (GHA)	5.76 m
Triple jump	Baya Rahouli (ALG)	13.09 m	Chantal Ouoba (BUR)	11.99 m	Adélaïde Koudougnon (CIV)	11.93 m
Shot put	Iman Mahrous (EGY)	13.13 m	Stella Okpokwu (NGR)	12.10 m	Inès Ouédraogo (BUR)	11.82 m
Discus throw	Stella Okpokwu (NGR)	36.96 m	Chantal Obou Cho (CIV)	33.86 m	Iman Mahrous (EGY)	31.56 m
Javelin throw	Aïda Sellam (TUN)	47.38 m	Agnes Afiyo (GHA)	39.00 m	Zahra Lachgar (MAR)	38.92 m
