= List of Malian records in athletics =

The following are the national records in athletics in Mali maintained by its national athletics federation: Fédération Malienne d'Athlétisme (FMA).

== Outdoor ==
Key to tables: Awaiting ratification Record not kept by FMA

h = hand timing

=== Men ===
Event	Record	Athlete	Date	Meet	Place	Ref.	Video
100 m	10.10 (+1.2 m/s)	Ousmane Diarra	4 May 1996		Athens, United States		
200 m	20.52 (+1.8 m/s)	Fodé Sissoko	14 July 2018	Kortrijk Guldensporenmeeting	Kortrijk, Belgium		
400 m	46.14	Yaya Seyba	20 July 1988		Bad Blankenburg, East Germany		
800 m	1:46.38	Moussa Camara	27 August 2011	World Championships	Daegu, South Korea		
1500 m	3:52.29	Abébé Moussa Ali	13 April 2008		Bamako, Mali		
3000 m	8:44.0	Youssouf Diallo	27 March 2002		Bamako, Mali		
5000 m	14:23.2	Youssouf Diallo	20 July 1997		Cotonou, Benin		
10,000 m	30:47.98	Youssouf Diallo	20 July 1994		Lisbon, Portugal		
Half marathon	1:06:35	Youssouf Diallo	19 March 2001		Dakar, Senegal		
Marathon	2:34:16	Siaka Sangaré	23 January 2011	Bamako Marathon	Bamako, Mali		
110 m hurdles	13.62 (+0.4 m/s)	Bano Traoré	4 July 2015	Meeting Areva	Saint-Denis, France		
400 m hurdles	49.13	Ibrahim Maïga	28 April 2007		Dakar, Senegal		
3000 m steeplechase	9:17.9	Youssouf Békaye Coulibaly	30 May 1998		Niamey, Niger		
High jump	2.25 m	Abdoulaye Diarra	24 May 2015	Interclubs Elite Final	Tourcoing, France		
Pole vault	4.00 m	Bassan Bagayoko	31 October 1982		Arles, France		
Long jump	7.82 m (−0.9 m/s)	Mamadou Chérif Dia	27 April 2010	CAA Grand Meet	Bamako, Mali		
Triple jump	16.59 m (+0.2 m/s)	Mamadou Chérif Dia	3 June 2017	CAA Meet	Bamako, Mali		
Triple jump	16.59 m (+0.1 m/s)	Mamadou Chérif Dia	24 July 2017	Jeux de la Francophonie	Abidjan, Ivory Coast		
Shot put	18.04 m	Namakoro Niaré	24 August 1971		Louvain, Belgium		
Discus throw	62.48 m	Namakoro Niaré	23 April 1972		Colombes, France		
Hammer throw	42.28 m	Namakoro Niaré	26 April 1980		Melun, France		
Javelin throw	64.70 m (Note: 64.87 m sourced by World Athletics)	Moctar Djigui	27 April 2010	CAA Grand Meet	Bamako, Mali		
Decathlon	5903 pts h	Bassan Bagayoko	17-18 April 1982		Béziers, France		
Decathlon	100m / Long jump / Shot put / High jump / 400m / 110m H / Discus / Pole vault / Javelin / 1500m; 11.6 / 6.28 m / 10.93 m / 1.70 m / 54.5 / 15.9 / 32.38 m / 3.85 m / 39.96 m / 4:48.7						
20 km walk (road)							
50 km walk (road)							
4 × 100 m relay	40.83	Mali; Rafan Berthé; Garan Coulibaly; Modibo Diarra; Baba Mariko	23 May 2009		Porto-Novo, Benin		
4 × 400 m relay	3:11.84	Mali; Bourama Coulibaly; Diakalia Bamba; Sinaly Coulibaly; Oumar Sy	21 July 2019	Tournoi de la Solidarité	Niamey, Niger		

=== Women ===
Event	Record	Athlete	Date	Meet	Place	Ref.
100 m	11.39 (+1.0 m/s)	Kadiatou Camara	30 March 2008		Dakar, Senegal	
200 m	22.70 (+1.5 m/s)	Kadiatou Camara	4 May 2008	African Championships	Addis Ababa, Ethiopia	
400 m	52.24	Djénébou Danté	10 June 2016	Meeting National	Colmar, France	
800 m	2:05.38	Matata Sanogo	8 July 2006	Meeting Areva	Saint-Denis, France	
1500 m	4:38.06	Matata Sanogo	4 May 2003		Franconville, France	
3000 m	10:36.80	Mamou Diallo	11 June 2016		Banjul, Gambia	
5000 m	16:57.54	Awa Kleimann	7 June 2019		Lunéville, France	
10,000 m						
Marathon	5:04:08	Yonica Begni	25 January 2009	Marathon International Marrakech	Marrakesh, Morocco	
100 m hurdles	13.21	Rahamatou Dramé	4 July 2010		Chambéry, France	
400 m hurdles	1:02.52	Oumou Keïta	13 June 2010		Joinville-le-Pont, France	
3000 m steeplechase						
High jump	1.69 m	Yah Koïta	9 June 2000		Kumasi, Ghana	
Pole vault	2.40 m	Dienabou Diarra	29 May 2016		Savigny-le-Temple, France	
Long jump	6.53 m	Kadiatou Camara	6 April 2003		Bamako, Mali	
Triple jump	12.94 m	Yah Soucko Koïta	11 December 2005		Niamey, Nigeria	
Shot put	13.82 m	Oumou Traoré	17 February 1996		Adelaide, Australia	
Discus throw	47.67 m	Oumou Traoré	11 July 2000		Algiers, Algeria	
Hammer throw	54.11 m	Dia Emilie	8 February 2026	Critérium LIFA Hivernal de Lancer Long - 2ème tour	Bois d'Arcy, France	
Javelin throw	49.85 m	Kenifing Traoré	26 July 2017	Jeux de la Francophonie	Abidjan, Ivory Coast	
Heptathlon	3507 pts	Aïssatou Wagué	14–15 May 2010		Cormeilles-en-Parisis, France	
Heptathlon	100m H / High jump / Shot put / 200m / Long jump / Javelin / 800m; 18.85 / 1.45 m / 10.35 m / 28.86 / 4.81 m / 28.04 m / 2:49.18					
20 km walk (road)						
50 km walk (road)						
4 × 100 m relay	46.1	Mali; N. Sidibe; Yah Koïta; Djénabou Danté; Kadiatou Camara	26 May 2007		Ouagadougou, Burkina Faso	
4 × 400 m relay	3:45.20	Mali; Yah Koïta; Kadiatou Camara; Ramatoulaye Gassama; Dipa Traoré	13 April 2008		Bamako, Mali	

== Indoor ==
=== Men ===
Event	Record	Athlete	Date	Meet	Place	Ref.
55 m	6.07	Ousmane Diarra	10 February 1996		Ames, United States	
60 m	6.63	Ousmane Diarra	1 March 1996		Atlanta, United States	
200 m	20.88	Fodé Sissoko	21 February 2021	French Championships	Miramas, France	
400 m	47.54	Fodé Sissoko	26 January 2019		Lievin, France	
800 m	1:50.42	Moussa Camara	30 January 2016	14th Vectis Meeting	Kirchberg, Luxembourg	
1500 m	4:06.70	Youssouf Diallo	9 March 2001	World Championships	Lisbon, Portugal	
3000 m						
60 m hurdles	7.84	Moussa Sissoko	17 February 2001	Meeting Pas de Calais	Liévin, France	
High jump	2.24 m	Abdoulaye Diarra	17 February 2013		Aubière, France	
High jump	2.24 m	Abdoulaye Diarra	7 February 2015		Eaubonne, France	
Pole vault						
Long jump	7.68 m	Moussa Sissoko	17 February 2001	Meeting Pas de Calais	Liévin, France	
Triple jump	16.09 m	Mamadou Cherif Dia	14 January 2017		Aubière, France	
Shot put						
Heptathlon						
Heptathlon	60m / Long jump / Shot put / High jump / 60m H / Pole vault / 1000m					
5000 m walk						
4 × 400 m relay						

=== Women ===
Event	Record	Athlete	Date	Meet	Place	Ref.
60 m	7.35	Kadiatou Camara	23 February 2003		Moscow, Russia	
200 m						
400 m	54.05	Djénébou Danté	20 February 2021		Miramas, France	
800 m	2:08.14	Matata Sanogo	22 February 2004		Aubière, France	
1500 m						
3000 m						
60 m hurdles	8.68	Rahmatou Dramé	25 January 2014		Paris, France	
High jump						
Pole vault	2.82 m (Note: outdoor mark ratified as absolute record)	Aminata Sanoko	13 January 1996		Cercy-la-Tour, France	
Long jump	6.11 m	Kadiatou Camara	7 February 2004		Moscow, Russia	
Triple jump	12.52 m	Yanoudji Diarra	12 December 2020		Kearney, United States	
Shot put						
Pentathlon						
Pentathlon	60m H / High jump / Shot put / Long jump / 800m					
3000 m walk						
4 × 400 m relay						
