= Athletics at the 2003 All-Africa Games – Women's shot put =

The women's shot put event at the 2003 All-Africa Games was held on October 11.

== Results ==
Rank	Name	Nationality	Result	Notes
1st place, gold medalist(s)	Vivian Chukwuemeka	Nigeria	18.12	
2nd place, silver medalist(s)	Veronica Abrahamse	South Africa	15.77	
3rd place, bronze medalist(s)	Wafaa Ismail Baghdadi	Egypt	15.32	
4	Miriam Ibekwe	Nigeria	15.17	
5	Alifatou Djibril	Togo	14.87	
6	Hiba Mecilhi	Egypt	13.90	
7	Maria Borges	Cape Verde	12.38	
