= Segun =

Segun may refer to:

- Mabel Segun (1930–2025), Nigerian poet, playwright and writer of short stories and children's books
- Segun, a variant of the Nigerian name Olusegun
- Según, a Spanish preposition
