= Kenneth Andam =

Ghanaian sprinter

Personal information
- Native name: Ekow
- Full name: Kenneth Ekow Andam
- Nickname: Sky
- Citizenship: United States
- Born: 8 January 1976 (age 50) Sekondi-Takoradi, Ghana
- Education: Brigham Young University; Colorado Technical University; St. Augustine's College, Cape Coast
- Occupation: Athlete
- Years active: 1992 - 2005
- Employers: WorldVuer, Inc.
- Height: 1.83 m (6 ft 0 in)
- Weight: 73.00 kg (161 lb)
- Other interests: Entrepreneur
- Website: http://www.kennethandam.com

Sport
- Country: United States
- Sport: Track and field
- Events: 100 metres 200 metres 4 × 100 metres relay Long jump Triple Jump
- University team: BYU Cougars
- Coached by: Willard Hirschi
- Retired: Retired

Achievements and titles
- Personal bests: 100 m: 10.12 sec (2000); 200 m: 20.47 sec (2001)
Medal record
Men's athletics
Representing Ghana
African Championships
Gold medal – first place	2000 Algiers	4×100 m
Bronze medal – third place	2000 Algiers	100 m
African Junior Championships
Gold medal – first place	1995 Ivory Coast	Triple jump
- Updated on 24 August 2012

Kenneth Ekow Andam (born 8 January 1976) is a retired Ghanaian sprinter who competed in the 4 × 100 metres relay at the 2000 Summer Olympics in Sydney, Australia. Andam was an All-American in track and field while competing for Brigham Young University.

== Personal ==
A native of Takoradi, Ghana, Kenneth Ekow Andam was born 8 January 1976. His parents are Kenneth and Janet Andam, and his religious affiliation has been reported to be Mormonism.

== Athletics ==
=== Junior athlete ===
In 1995, Andam won the triple jump at the African Junior Athletics Championships in the Bouaké, Ivory Coast (15.63 metres) and the West African championships in the Long Jump in Banjul, Gambia. He also set an inter-regional triple jump record of 16.02 meters in WA, a township in the northern part of Ghana during the 1995 inter-regional championships and was awarded the best male athlete of the competition that year.

=== Collegiate career ===
Andam attended Brigham Young University where he competed on the Cougars' track and field team in the 100 metres, 200 metres, 4 × 100 metres relay, and the long jump. As of 2012, he holds top ten marks for BYU in each event, including a school record in the 4 × 100 relay set in 1999 with Ghanaian teammate Leonard Myles-Mills (38.88 seconds). Andam is ranked third on BYU's all-time best list behind Frank Fredericks and Myles-Mills, and third behind Fredericks and Oluyemi Kayode.

Accredited to Andam are Western Athletic Conference (WAC) awards, including freshman of the year both indoor and outdoor, Mountain West Conference (MWC) Awards and records for track & field and National Collegiate Athletic Association (NCAA) All American Honors. As of 2011, he holds Mountain West Conference all-time records in the indoor 60 metres and 200 meters, and the outdoor 100 meters and 200 meters.

In 1999, Andam was ranked 11th in the nation in the 100 metres and 7th in the 200 metres and was the WAC champion in the long jump as well as the 4 X 100 relay. In the long jump, he was injured upon landing and was unable to compete in the 60 and 20 metres events. At the 1999 NCAA Men's Outdoor Track and Field Championship in Boise, Idaho, he advance with Myles-Mills to the semi-finals of the 200 metres and his 4 X 100 relay team, ranked No. 1 in the nation, qualified for the finals with the fastest semi-final time. Andam was injured before the finals, and BYU's relay team eventually finished third in the nation.

Andam was injured with a stress fracture in January 2000, but recovered to post performances that twice earned him the title of the Mountain West Conference Men's Outdoor Track and Field Athlete of the Week. That season, he was the MWC champion in the 100 and 200 metres, and qualified in the 100 metres and 4 X 100 for the 2000 NCAA Men's Outdoor Track and Field Championship in Durham, North Carolina.

At the 2001 Mountain West Conference championships, Andam earned the Men's High Point Award. Prior to the 2001 NCAA Track and Field Championships in Eugene Oregon, Andam was ranked No. 8 in the nation for the 100 metres. In the finals, he posted a time of 10.39 to finish in 7th.

=== International competition ===
In 1999, Andam represented Ghana in the 200 metres at the 1999 World Championships in Seville, Spain. He finished sixth in his preliminary heat (21.31 seconds) and failed to advance to the quarter-finals. The following year at the 2000 African Championships in Algiers, Andam earned a bronze medal in the 100 metres (10.33 seconds) as well as a gold medal on Ghana's 4 × 100 relay team (39.90 seconds). At the 2000 Summer Olympics in Sydney, he represented Ghana in the 4 X 100; however, his team failed to finish in their qualifying heat. Andam also competed in the 100 metres at the 2001 World Championships in Edmonton, Canada. In his preliminary heat, he finished third in 10.40 to qualify for the quarter-finals. In the quarter finals, Andam narrowly missed qualifying for the semi-finals with a fourth-place finish in 10.26.

== Other ventures ==
Andam has three books published by AuthorHouse called the Scarlet Minor Chronicles which is a series of five books with the last two books still under development.

Andam founded WorldVuer Inc., a media communications company that has developed proprietary technologies for communicating bandwidth intensive data. Andam also co-founded Globa, Inc. with Johan Meyer to provide mobile banking and mobile remittance to Africans across the continent and their relatives living abroad. Andam also founded Payodd, a merchant processing and mobile transaction platform supplier to consumers and business globally, to provide the flexibility in payment processing that merchants needed to reduce their cost of acquiring and generating revenues for their businesses. He is also founder of OS Petro, Inc., which is an oil and gas company with concessions and reserves in Ghana and Namibia. Andam is also founder and chairman of SIDE EQUITY, a company that funds projects in the technology, natural resources, and consumables sector. Andam founded Sleek Media Group. Andam is also founder of Beverly Air LTD, a real estate development company focused on community development projects in Ghana and across Africa.

On January 10, 2018, Andam pled guilty in Utah's Fourth District Court to Securities Fraud in connection with investments in Globa, Inc. He failed to appear for his scheduled sentencing, triggering a statewide warrant to be issued for his arrest after his attorney's motion to continue the sentencing was denied on 4/3/2018. Andam's counsel has filed a motion to withdraw the guilty plea. An evidentiary hearing on that motion has been scheduled for May 8, 2018. Andam is currently a fugitive from the law, as he pleaded guilty to securities fraud in criminal proceeding (State of Utah v. Kenneth Ekow Andam, Case No.151401901, Fourth District Court, Utah County, State of Utah), but failed to appear for his sentencing on June 1, 2018.

== Athletic record ==
=== Outdoor ===
Distance	Time (seconds)	Wind	Location	Date
100 metres	10.12	+ 0.4 m/s	Utah	June 2001
200 metres	20.47	+ 2.0 m/s	Utah	May 1999
Long jump	7.67 m	+ 1.2 m/s	Los Angeles	May 1998
Triple jump	16.02 m	+ 0.0 m/s	Ghana	May 1995

=== Indoor ===
Event	Best	Location	Date
55 metres	6.12 s	Idaho	February 1998
60 metres	6.59 s	Utah	March 2003
200 metres	21.07 s	Colorado Springs	February 1998
Long jump	7.62 m	Colorado Springs	February 1998
