= Athletics at the 2003 All-Africa Games – Women's discus throw =

The women's discus throw event at the 2003 All-Africa Games was held on October 12.

== Results ==
Rank	Name	Nationality	Result	Notes
1st place, gold medalist(s)	Elizna Naudé	South Africa	57.44	GR
2nd place, silver medalist(s)	Vivian Chukwuemeka	Nigeria	54.83	
3rd place, bronze medalist(s)	Alifatou Djibril	Togo	54.79	
4	Kalthoum Saadaoui	Tunisia	53.88	
5	Hiba Mecilhi	Egypt	52.16	
6	Anne Otutu	Nigeria	50.99	
7	Brigitte Traoré	Burkina Faso	45.54	
8	Oumou Traoré	Mali	42.08	
9	Sónia Borges	Cape Verde	33.53	
