= Athletics at the 2006 Commonwealth Games – Women's discus throw =

Women's discus throw at the Commonwealth Games

The women's discus throw event at the 2006 Commonwealth Games was held on March 21.

== Results ==
Rank	Athlete	Nationality	#1	#2	#3	#4	#5	#6	Result	Notes
1st place, gold medalist(s)	Elizna Naudé	South Africa	58.07	58.74	61.55	59.44	60.38	60.31	61.55	
2nd place, silver medalist(s)	Seema Antil	India	59.77	60.56	x	59.13	x	58.47	60.56	SB
3rd place, bronze medalist(s)	Dani Samuels	Australia	57.61	x	57.71	55.81	58.69	59.44	59.44	PB
4	Beatrice Faumuina	New Zealand	54.88	57.29	58.77	x	59.12	x	59.12	
5	Krishna Poonia	India	58.65	56.23	x	x	54.05	58.61	58.65	PB
6	Philippa Roles	Wales	55.35	x	58.35	57.95	58.38	57.80	58.38	SB
7	Harwant Kaur	India	55.29	55.06	x	55.03	56.69	57.64	57.64	
8	Claire Smithson	England	53.51	49.42	x	52.42	49.20	54.34	54.34	
9	Vivian Chukwuemeka	Nigeria	x	x	53.37				53.37	
10	Monique Nacsa	Australia	52.63	x	53.00				53.00	
11	Tereapii Tapoki	Cook Islands	44.57	50.65	51.50				51.50	
12	Kara Nwidobie	England	48.96	49.56	50.18				50.18	
13	Melehifo Uhi	Tonga	46.67	x	47.74				47.74	
14	Lauren Therin	Jersey	44.21	45.56	46.96				46.96	
