= Mariam Ibekwe =

Nigerian shot putter (born 1969)

Medal record

Women's athletics

Representing Nigeria

African Games
Bronze medal – third place	1991 Cairo	Shot put

African Championships
Gold medal – first place	2010 Nairobi	Shot put
Silver medal – second place	1989 Lagos	Shot put

Mariam Ibekwe (née Nnodu; born 29 October 1969) is a Nigerian former track and field athlete who competed in the shot put. She set her personal best of 16.68 m (54 ft 8 1/2 in) in 2007.

Ibekwe won her first international medals in 1989, taking the title at the West African University Games and a silver medal behind Hanan Ahmed Khaled at the 1989 African Championships in Athletics, held on home turf in Lagos. She was again behind Egypt's Khaled at the 1991 All-Africa Games, coming third on that occasion.

She had a break from international competition in the mid-1990s, but returned in 1997 with a win at the West African Athletics Championships and eighth at the 1998 IAAF World Cup. She continued to compete into her thirties, being a finalist at the 2003 All-Africa Games and the 2003 Afro-Asian Games. Her career peak came at the age of forty, when she won the shot put gold medal at the 2010 African Championships in Athletics. In her final major international appearance, she was seventh at the 2010 IAAF Continental Cup.

At national level, she won three straight titles at the Nigerian Athletics Championships between 1989 and 1991, becoming the first woman to throw beyond fourteen metres at the competition. She fell behind Vivian Chukwuemeka in the national rankings in the mid-1990s, but returned with two national titles in 1997 and 1998, with championship records of 15.54 m (50 ft 11 3/4 in) and 16.42 m (53 ft 10 1/4 in). Chukwuemeka won the next seven titles and Ibekwe won her sixth national title in 2006.

== International competitions ==
Year	Competition	Venue	Position	Event	Notes
1989	West African University Games	Ouagadougou, Burkina Faso	1st	Shot put	13.08 m
1989	African Championships	Lagos, Nigeria	2nd	Shot put	14.02 m
1991	All-Africa Games	Cairo, Egypt	3rd	Shot put	14.66 m
1997	West African Athletics Championships	Cotonou, Benin	1st	Shot put	15.47 m
1998	World Cup	Johannesburg, South Africa	8th	Shot put	15.60 m
2003	All-Africa Games	Abuja, Nigeria	4th	Shot put	15.17 m
2003	Afro-Asian Games	Hyderabad, India	6th	Shot put	14.78 m
2010	African Championships	Nairobi, Kenya	1st	Shot put	13.67 m
2010	Continental Cup	Split, Croatia	7th	Shot put	13.67 m

== National titles ==
- Nigerian Athletics Championships
  - Shot put: 1989, 1990, 1991, 1997, 1998, 2006

== See also ==
- List of champions of the African Championships in Athletics
