= 2002 African Championships in Athletics – Women's shot put =

The women's shot put event at the 2002 African Championships in Athletics was held in Radès, Tunisia on August 10.

== Results ==
| Rank | Name | Nationality | Result | Notes |
|---|---|---|---|---|
| 1st place, gold medalist(s) | Vivian Chukwuemeka | Nigeria | 17.60 | |
| 2nd place, silver medalist(s) | Amel Ben Khaled | Tunisia | 15.94 | |
| 3rd place, bronze medalist(s) | Wafaa Ismail Baghdadi | Egypt | 15.43 | |
| 4 | Heba Zachary | Egypt | 15.40 | |
| 5 | Monique Ngo Ngoué | Cameroon | 14.55 | |
| 6 | Alifatou Djibril | Togo | 14.41 | |
| 7 | Faten Gafsi | Tunisia | 13.33 | |
| 8 | Nawal Salah Abdou | Libya | 9.32 | |
| | Fatoumata Camara | Guinea | DNS | |
| | Bernadette Ravina | Mauritius | DNS | |
| | Oumou Traoré | Mali | DNS | |
