= 1996 World Junior Championships in Athletics – Women's shot put =

The women's shot put event at the 1996 World Junior Championships in Athletics was held in Sydney, Australia, at International Athletic Centre on 22 and 24 August.

== Medalists ==
Gold	Song Feina; China
Silver	Nadine Beckel; Germany
Bronze	Yelena Ivanenko; Belarus

== Results ==
=== Final ===
24 August

Rank	Name	Nationality	Attempts						Result	Notes
Rank	Name	Nationality	1	2	3	4	5	6	Result	Notes
1st place, gold medalist(s)	Song Feina	China	16.12	15.90	x	16.58	x	x	16.58	
2nd place, silver medalist(s)	Nadine Beckel	Germany	x	16.11	15.03	x	16.38	16.39	16.39	
3rd place, bronze medalist(s)	Yelena Ivanenko	Belarus	15.39	15.67	16.22	x	x	x	16.22	
4	Bai Damei	China	16.02	16.06	16.03	16.01	x	x	16.06	
5	Sofia Orfaniotou	Greece	14.46	15.18	15.50	14.47	x	x	15.50	
6	Oksana Chibisova	Russia	15.13	15.20	15.20	14.66	15.21	x	15.21	
7	Claudia Venghaus	Germany	14.91	15.16	14.96	x	x	14.69	15.16	
8	Seilala Sua	United States	15.00	15.03	14.64	x	14.75	15.04	15.04	
9	Mari Wahlman	Finland	14.44	14.03	14.82				14.82	
10	Jo Jin-Suk	South Korea	14.67	14.21	14.09				14.67	
11	Lisa Patterson	Australia	13.98	13.79	14.45				14.45	
12	Noria Nesnas	France	14.17	x	14.03				14.17	

=== Qualifications ===
22 Aug

==== Group A ====
Rank	Name	Nationality	Attempts			Result	Notes
Rank	Name	Nationality	1	2	3	Result	Notes
1	Bai Damei	China	15.88	-	-	15.88	Q
2	Nadine Beckel	Germany	13.72	15.70	-	15.70	Q
3	Song Feina	China	15.54	-	-	15.54	Q
4	Yelena Ivanenko	Belarus	14.81	14.68	15.14	15.14	Q
5	Seilala Sua	United States	15.03	-	-	15.03	Q
6	Sofia Orfaniotou	Greece	15.01	-	-	15.01	Q
7	Oksana Chibisova	Russia	14.34	14.22	14.91	14.91	q
8	Claudia Venghaus	Germany	14.73	14.75	x	14.75	q
9	Lisa Patterson	Australia	14.05	14.24	14.43	14.43	q
10	Jo Jin-Suk	South Korea	13.70	13.91	14.40	14.40	q
11	Mari Wahlman	Finland	12.83	13.97	14.26	14.26	q
12	Noria Nesnas	France	13.85	x	13.84	13.85	q
13	Assunta Legnante	Italy	x	13.44	13.09	13.44	
14	Doris Thompson	Bahamas	x	x	13.14	13.14	
15	Siniva Marsters	Cook Islands	8.69	x	8.52	8.69	

== Participation ==
According to an unofficial count, 15 athletes from 13 countries participated in the event.

- Australia (1)
- Bahamas (1)
- Belarus (1)
- China (2)
- Cook Islands (1)
- Finland (1)
- France (1)
- Germany (2)
- Greece (1)
- Italy (1)
- Russia (1)
- South Korea (1)
- United States (1)
