= Suzanne Kragbé =

Ivorian discus thrower (born 1981)

Medal record

Women's athletics

Representing Ivory Coast

African Championships
Silver medal – second place	2008 Addis Ababa	Discus throw
Silver medal – second place	2010 Nairobi	Discus throw
Bronze medal – third place	2006 Bambous	Discus throw

Kazai Suzanne Kragbé (born 22 December 1981) is an Ivorian athlete specializing in the discus throw. She competed twice at the World Championships in Athletics failing to progress to the final.

Her personal best in the event is 59.61 metres from 2014. She was the gold medalist at the 2011 All-Africa Games and the 2013 Jeux de la Francophonie. Additionally, she has twice been the runner-up and twice bronze medalist at the African Championships in Athletics.

== Competition records ==
Year	Competition	Venue	Position	Event	Notes
Representing Ivory Coast
1997	African Junior Championships	Ibadan, Nigeria	5th	Discus throw	35.61 m
1999	African Junior Championships	Tunis, Tunisia	7th	Shot put	9.38 m
1999	African Junior Championships	Tunis, Tunisia	3rd	Discus throw	39.32 m
2000	World Junior Championships	Santiago, Chile	23rd (q)	Discus throw	39.29 m
2001	Jeux de la Francophonie	Ottawa, Canada	8th	Discus throw	45.70 m
2002	African Championships	Radès, Tunisia	7th	Discus throw	45.63 m
2005	Jeux de la Francophonie	Niamey, Niger	3rd	Discus throw	48.72 m
2006	African Championships	Bambous, Mauritius	3rd	Discus throw	49.05 m
2007	All-Africa Games	Algiers, Algeria	4th	Discus throw	51.43 m
2008	African Championships	Addis Ababa, Ethiopia	2nd	Discus throw	49.52 m
2009	World Championships	Berlin, Germany	35th (q)	Discus throw	53.84 m
2009	Jeux de la Francophonie	Beirut, Lebanon	2nd	Discus throw	53.68 m
2010	African Championships	Nairobi, Kenya	2nd	Discus throw	55.53 m
2011	World Championships	Daegu, South Korea	19th (q)	Discus throw	57.55 m
2011	All-Africa Games	Maputo, Mozambique	1st	Discus throw	56.56 m
2012	African Championships	Porto-Novo, Benin	3rd	Discus throw	54.56 m
2013	Jeux de la Francophonie	Nice, France	1st	Discus throw	55.58 m
