= 2012 African Championships in Athletics – Women's discus throw =

The women's discus throw at the 2012 African Championships in Athletics was held at the Stade Charles de Gaulle on 28 June.

== Medalists ==
Gold	Chinwe Okoro; Nigeria
Silver	Elizna Naudé; South Africa
Bronze	Kazai Suzanne Kragbé; Ivory Coast

== Records ==
Standing records prior to the 2012 African Championships in Athletics
World record	Gabriele Reinsch (GDR)	76.80	Neubrandenburg, East Germany	9 July 1988
African record	Elizna Naudé (RSA)	64.87	Stellenbosch, South Africa	2 March 2007
Championship record	Monia Kari (TUN)	58.46	Algiers, Algeria	11 July 2000

== Schedule ==
Date	Time	Round
28 June 2012	15:50	Final

== Results ==
=== Final ===
Rank	Athlete	Nationality	#1	#2	#3	#5	#5	#6	Result	Notes
1st place, gold medalist(s)	Chinwe Okoro	Nigeria	51.46	x	52.54	54.53	x	56.60	56.60	
2nd place, silver medalist(s)	Elizna Naudé	South Africa	54.55	53.90	55.88	x	x	x	55.88	
3rd place, bronze medalist(s)	Kazai Suzanne Kragbé	Ivory Coast	x	54.56	x	49.36	x	53.84	54.56	
4	Elham El Sayed Wahaba	Egypt	51.94	50.50	49.35	48.28	49.29	49.49	51.94	
5	Alifatou Djibril	Togo	48.41	48.30	x	47.45	45.99	x	48.41	
6	Mamina Soura	Burkina Faso	43.57	46.02	45.75	40.58	x	40.75	46.02	
7	Marthe Ayangma	Cameroon	41.56	x	43.37	43.57	43.57	41.84	43.57	
8	Malak Alsorry	Libya	35.21	40.87	42.21	37.69	38.57	36.87}	42.21	NR
9	Mersit Gebre	Ethiopia	39.17	x	x				39.17	NR
10	Auriole Dongmo	Cameroon	x	32.34	x				32.34	
