= 2008 African Championships in Athletics – Women's discus throw =

The women's discus throw event at the 2008 African Championships in Athletics was held at the Addis Ababa Stadium on May 1.

== Results ==
Rank	Athlete	Nationality	#1	#2	#3	#4	#5	#6	Result	Notes
1st place, gold medalist(s)	Elizna Naudé	South Africa	x	54.91	x	53.16	53.25	55.34	55.34	
2nd place, silver medalist(s)	Kazai Suzanne Kragbé	Ivory Coast	47.43	47.57	48.69	49.47	47.16	49.52	49.52	
3rd place, bronze medalist(s)	Simoné du Toit	South Africa	x	42.21	x	44.68	47.10	45.25	47.10	
4	Alifatou Djibril	Togo	44.42	44.55	44.47	41.19	42.02	45.78	45.78	
5	Mersit Gebre-Egziabher	Ethiopia	35.54	36.79	35.69	x	35.91	x	36.79	NR
6	Firehiwot Kebede	Ethiopia	31.14	33.68	30.52	31.03	31.81	x	33.68	
7	Selamawit Gezmu	Ethiopia	32.42	32.48	30.93	x	30.73	33.04	33.04	
	Monia Kari	Tunisia							DNS	

== Bibliography ==
- Results (Archived)
- Results
