= Kipkemboi Cheruiyot =

Kenyan athlete

Personal information
- Nationality: Kenya
- Born: 10 August 1970 (age 55)

Sport
- Sport: Track and Field
- Event: Athletics

Achievements and titles
- Personal best(s): 3000m SC: 8.38.72 (1996); Half marathon: 1:03.08 (2008); Marathon: 2:11.24 (1999)
Medal record
Men's athletics
Representing Kenya
African Championships
Gold medal – first place	1996 Yaoundé	300 m s'chase

Kipkemboi Vincent Cheruiyot (born 10 August 1970) is a retired Kenyan steeplechase and marathon runner.

He won the gold in the 3000 metres steeplechase race at the 1996 African Championships in Athletics in Yaoundé in June 1996.

== International competition record ==
Year	Competition	Venue	Position	Event	Notes
1996	African Championships	Yaoundé, Cameroon	1st	3000 m s'chase	8:38.72
