= Irache Quintanal =

Spanish athletics competitor

Irache Quintanal Franco (born 18 September 1978 in Reus, Tarragona) is a female shot putter from Spain.

She finished fifteenth at the 2001 Summer Universiade and eighth at the 2002 IAAF World Cup. She also competed at the 2004 Olympic Games, the 2007 World Championships and the 2008 Olympic Games without reaching the final.

Her personal best throw is 18.20 metres, achieved in July 2007 in Barcelona. This is the current Spanish record.

== Achievements ==
Year	Competition	Venue	Position	Event	Notes
Representing Spain
1997	European Junior Championships	Ljubljana, Slovenia	8th	Shot put	15.09 m
1999	European U23 Championships	Gothenburg, Sweden	10th	Shot put	14.92 m
1999	European U23 Championships	Gothenburg, Sweden	13th (q)	Discus	51.06 m
2001	Universiade	Beijing, China	15th	Shot put	14.83 m
2001	Universiade	Beijing, China	15th (q)	Discus throw	49.86 m
2004	Ibero-American Championships	Huelva, Spain	6th	Shot put	16.45 m
2004	Ibero-American Championships	Huelva, Spain	5th	Discus throw	54.92 m
2004	Olympic Games	Athens, Greece	29th (q)	Shot put	15.99 m
2006	Ibero-American Championships	Ponce, Puerto Rico	2nd	Shot put	16.20 m
2006	Ibero-American Championships	Ponce, Puerto Rico	2nd	Discus throw	53.77 m
2007	European Indoor Championships	Birmingham, United Kingdom	12th (q)	Shot put	16.00 m
2007	World Championships	Osaka, Japan	24th (q)	Shot put	16.53 m
2008	Olympic Games	Beijing, China	–	Shot put	NM
2010	European Championships	Barcelona, Spain	17th (q)	Shot put	16.01 m
2010	European Championships	Barcelona, Spain	21st (q)	Discus throw	50.81 m
