= 1999 European Athletics U23 Championships – Women's discus throw =

The women's discus throw event at the 1999 European Athletics U23 Championships was held in Gothenburg, Sweden, at Ullevi on 29 July 1999.

== Medalists ==
Gold	Lăcrămioara Ionescu; Romania
Silver	Nadine Beckel; Germany
Bronze	Věra Pospíšilová; Czech Republic

== Results ==
=== Final ===
29 July

Rank	Name	Nationality	Attempts						Result	Notes
Rank	Name	Nationality	1	2	3	4	5	6	Result	Notes
1st place, gold medalist(s)	Lăcrămioara Ionescu	Romania	58.24	56.78	55.04	58.07	58.07	57.30	58.24	CR
2nd place, silver medalist(s)	Nadine Beckel	Germany	x	57.75	x	54.89	47.34	x	57.75	
3rd place, bronze medalist(s)	Věra Pospíšilová	Czech Republic	53.76	54.33	55.93	56.65	54.64	55.53	56.65	
4	Philippa Roles	Great Britain	53.45	x	53.81	53.96	55.37	53.22	55.37	
5	Lyudmila Rublevskaya	Russia	53.19	x	54.96	x	x	x	54.96	
6	Anita Hietalahti	Finland	50.58	53.45	50.85	52.85	54.87	x	54.87	
7	Ileana Brindusoiu	Romania	x	54.31	52.06	53.94	x	51.37	54.31	
8	Katja Tenhonen	Finland	x	x	52.95	x	47.00	51.24	52.95	
9	Satu Järvenpää	Finland	49.08	48.88	51.35				51.35	
10	Maria Koletsou	Greece	44.15	48.74	51.28				51.28	
11	Maria Pettersson	Sweden	50.87	49.73	50.34				50.87	
12	Mélina Robert-Michon	France	x	x	50.75				50.75	

=== Qualifications ===
29 July
First 12 to the Final

Rank	Name	Nationality	Result	Notes
1	Lăcrămioara Ionescu	Romania	57.48	Q
2	Katja Tenhonen	Finland	55.05	Q
3	Mélina Robert-Michon	France	55.04	Q
4	Lyudmila Rublevskaya	Russia	54.40	Q
5	Nadine Beckel	Germany	53.90	Q
6	Maria Koletsou	Greece	53.75	Q
7	Věra Pospíšilová	Czech Republic	53.53	Q
8	Ileana Brindusoiu	Romania	53.18	Q
9	Anita Hietalahti	Finland	53.13	Q
10	Philippa Roles	Great Britain	52.77	Q
11	Satu Järvenpää	Finland	52.54	Q
12	Maria Pettersson	Sweden	51.78	Q
13	Irache Quintanal	Spain	51.06	
14	Catherine Géry	France	49.50	
15	Rebecca Roles	Great Britain	48.29	
16	Christelle Bornil	France	48.13	

== Participation ==
According to an unofficial count, 16 athletes from 10 countries participated in the event.

- Czech Republic (1)
- Finland (3)
- France (3)
- Germany (1)
- Great Britain (2)
- Greece (1)
- Romania (2)
- Russia (1)
- Spain (1)
- Sweden (1)
