= 2002 African Championships in Athletics – Women's discus throw =

The women's discus throw event at the 2002 African Championships in Athletics was held in Radès, Tunisia on August 6.

== Results ==
Rank	Name	Nationality	Result	Notes
1st place, gold medalist(s)	Monia Kari	Tunisia	55.28	
2nd place, silver medalist(s)	Vivian Chukwuemeka	Nigeria	54.12	
3rd place, bronze medalist(s)	Elizna Naudé	South Africa	51.89	
4	Alifatou Djibril	Togo	50.28	
5	Heba Zachary	Egypt	49.68	
6	Faten Gafsi	Tunisia	48.69	
7	Kazai Suzanne Kragbé	Ivory Coast	45.63	
8	Kalthoum Saadaoui	Tunisia	43.36	
9	Saliha Zekiski	Algeria	38.43	
10	Barka Warda	Libya	27.51	
