= 2006 African Championships in Athletics – Women's shot put =

The women's shot put event at the 2006 African Championships in Athletics was held at the Stade Germain Comarmond on August 13.

== Results ==
Rank	Name	Nationality	#1	#2	#3	#4	#5	#6	Result	Notes
1st place, gold medalist(s)	Vivian Chukwuemeka	Nigeria	16.90	x	17.22	17.45	17.36	17.15	17.45	
2nd place, silver medalist(s)	Wafa Ismail El Baghdadi	Egypt	15.07	15.48	15.37	15.29	x	x	15.48	
3rd place, bronze medalist(s)	Monique Ngo Ngoué-Poree	Cameroon	14.47	14.71	14.38	14.99	x	x	14.99	
	Bernadette Ravina	Mauritius							DNS	
