= Athletics at the 1998 Commonwealth Games – Women's discus throw =

Women's discus throw at the Commonwealth Games

The women's discus throw event at the 1998 Commonwealth Games was held on 20 September in Kuala Lumpur.

== Results ==
Rank	Name	Nationality	Result	Notes
1st place, gold medalist(s)	Beatrice Faumuina	New Zealand	65.92	GR
2nd place, silver medalist(s)	Lisa-Marie Vizaniari	Australia	62.14	
3rd place, bronze medalist(s)	Alison Lever	Australia	59.80	
4	Shelley Drew	England	56.13	
5	Jackie McKernan	Northern Ireland	55.16	
6	Philippa Roles	Wales	54.10	
7	Emma Merry	England	52.32	
8	Tracy Axten	England	51.58	
9	Michelle Fournier	Canada	45.49	
10	Caroline Fournier	Mauritius	45.13	
11	Natalia Brown	Jamaica	41.35	SB
