= Lizette Etsebeth =

South African discus thrower

Medal record

Women's athletics

Representing South Africa

Commonwealth Games
Bronze medal – third place	1994 Victoria	Discus throw

African Championships
Gold medal – first place	1992 Belle Vue	Discus throw
Gold medal – first place	1993 Durban	Discus throw

Lizette Etsebeth-Schoeman (born 3 May 1963) is a South African former track and field athlete who competed in the discus throw.

She was a two-time African champion, taking back-to-back titles at the African Championships in Athletics in 1992 and 1993. This made her South Africa's first female throws champion at the event. She also claimed a bronze at the 1994 Commonwealth Games and represented Africa at the 1994 IAAF World Cup.

She was a three-time winner at the South African Athletics Championships, taking consecutive discus titles from 1993 to 1995.

== International competitions ==
Year	Competition	Venue	Position	Event	Notes
1992	African Championships	Belle Vue Maurel, Mauritius	1st	Discus throw	54.84 m CR
1993	African Championships	Durban, South Africa	1st	Discus throw	54.16 m
1994	Commonwealth Games	Victoria, Canada	3rd	Discus throw	55.74 m
1994	IAAF World Cup	London, United Kingdom	8th	Discus throw	51.54 m

== National titles ==
- South African Athletics Championships
  - Discus throw: 1993, 1994, 1995
