= Lisa-Marie Vizaniari =

Australian discus thrower

Personal information
- Nationality: Australian
- Born: 14 December 1971 (age 54) Lake Cargelligo, New South Wales, Australia
- Height: 172 cm (5 ft 8 in)
- Weight: 103 kg (227 lb)

Sport
- Sport: Athletics
- Event: discus
- Club: Toowong Harriers/Griffith University
Medal record
Representing Great Britain
Athletics

Lisa-Marie Vizaniari (born 14 December 1971) is an Australian retired discus thrower who competed at two Olympic Games. She is also a retired professional boxer.

== Athletics career ==
Vizaniari won the British AAA Championships title at the 1990 AAA Championships.

At the 1996 Olympic Games in Atlanta, she represented Australia in the discus event.

Her personal best throw was 65.86 metres, achieved in March 1997 in Melbourne. The Australian, and Oceanian, record then belonged to Daniela Costian with 68.72 metres.

She went to her second Olympic Games in 2000 at Sydney, competing in the discus event again.

== Achievements ==
Year	Competition	Venue	Position	Event	Notes
Representing Australia
1989	World Cup	Barcelona, Spain	6th	Discus throw	57.92 m^{1}
1990	Commonwealth Games	Auckland, New Zealand	1st	Discus throw	56.38 m
1990	World Junior Championships	Plovdiv, Bulgaria	2nd	Discus throw	60.44 m
1994	Commonwealth Games	Victoria, Canada	3rd	Shot put	16.61 m
1994	Commonwealth Games	Victoria, Canada	6th	Discus throw	53.88 m
1995	World Championships	Gothenburg, Sweden	14th (q)	Discus throw	59.24 m
1996	Olympic Games	Atlanta, United States	8th	Discus throw	62.48 m
1997	World Championships	Athens, Greece	12th	Discus throw	57.56 m
1998	Goodwill Games	Uniondale, United States	8th	Discus throw	58.43 m
1998	Commonwealth Games	Kuala Lumpur, Malaysia	2nd	Discus throw	62.14 m
1999	World Championships	Seville, Spain	14th (q)	Discus throw	61.49 m
2000	Olympic Games	Sydney, Australia	8th	Discus throw	62.57 m

^{1}Representing Oceania

== Professional boxing ==
Lisa-Marie Vizaniari
- Height: 173 cm (5 ft 8 in)
- Weight: 122.4 kg (270 lb; 19 st 4 lb)
- Reach: 190 cm (74.8 in)
- Years active: 2001 - 2004, 2012 - 2014

Professional boxing record
- Total: 8
- Wins: 8
- By knockout: 4
- Losses: 0
- Draws: 0

Other information
- Boxing record from BoxRec

In 2001, Vizaniari made her professional debut as a boxer. Vizaniari is a two time World Heavyweight Champion.

=== Professional titles ===
- South Pacific Women's Heavyweight Title (218 Ibs)
- World Boxing Foundation female heavyweight title (272¼ Ibs)
- Women's International Boxing Association World heavyweight title (269¾ Ibs)

=== Professional record ===
8 fights	8 wins	0 losses
By knockout	4	0
By decision	4	0
Draws	0	

No.	Result	Record	Opponent	Type	Round, time	Date	Location	Notes
8	Win	8–0	(United States) Kathy Rivers	TKO	10 (10) 1:58	6 Nov 2014	Jupiters Hotel & Casino, Broadbeach, Queensland, Australia	vacant Women's International Boxing Association World heavyweight title
7	Win	7–0	(New Zealand) Victoria Nansen	UD	6	18 May 2013	Jupiters Hotel & Casino, Broadbeach, Queensland, Australia	
6	Win	6–0	(Sweden) Linda Eliason	TKO	1 (6) 0:59	21 Dec 2012	Jupiters Hotel & Casino, Broadbeach, Queensland, Australia	
5	Win	5–0	(New Zealand) Ali Dutt	UD	10	26 May 2012	Jupiters Hotel & Casino, Broadbeach, Queensland, Australia	vacant World Boxing Foundation female heavyweight title
4	Win	4–0	(New Zealand) Ali Dutt	UD	8	29 May 2003	Kath Dale Hall, Otahuhu, New Zealand	South Pacific Women's Heavyweight Title
3	Win	3–0	(New Zealand) Ali Dutt	UD	8	28 Feb 2002	ABA Stadium, Kohimarama, New Zealand	Vacant South Pacific Women's Heavyweight Title
2	Win	2–0	(Australia) Kelli Courtenay	KO	3 (5)	28 Feb 2002	Southport Sharks AFL Club, Southport, Queensland, Australia	
1	Win	1–0	(Australia) Leisa Hines	TKO	1 (4)	22 Jun 2001	Coolangatta Hotel, Coolangatta, Queensland, Australia	Professional debut

== Personal life ==
She is openly lesbian.
