= Athletics at the 2011 All-Africa Games – Women's shot put =

The women's shot put event at the 2011 All-Africa Games was held on 15 September.

== Results ==
Rank	Athlete	Nationality	#1	#2	#3	#4	#5	#6	Result	Notes
1st place, gold medalist(s)	Auriol Dongmo Mekemnang	Cameroon							16.03	
2nd place, silver medalist(s)	Veronica Abrahamse	South Africa							15.70	
3rd place, bronze medalist(s)	Sonia Smuts	South Africa							15.29	
4	Omotayo Talabi	Nigeria							14.84	
5	Doris Ange Ratsimbazafy	Madagascar							13.75	
6	Charlene Engelbrecht	Namibia							13.65	
7	Georgina Chirindza	Mozambique							11.86	
