= Philippa Roles =

Welsh discus thrower

Personal information
- Nationality: British (Welsh)
- Born: 1 March 1978 Neath, Wales
- Died: 22 May 2017 (aged 39) Catford, Lewisham, England
- Height: 180 cm (5 ft 11 in)
- Weight: 98 kg (216 lb)

Sport
- Sport: Athletics
- Event: discus throw
- Club: Swansea Harriers; Sale Harriers Manchester

Philippa Kate Roles (1 March 1978 – 21 May 2017) was a Welsh discus thrower who competed at two Olympic and four Commonwealth Games. Roles was British junior athlete of the year – an honour presented at Buckingham Palace. She was the first British discus thrower to medal at junior European level; and narrowly missed out on a medal at under 23 level, finishing 4th. She competed at the 2004 Summer Olympics in Athens and at the 2008 Summer Olympics in Beijing.

== Biography ==
Born in Neath, she studied at Neath Port Talbot College from where she gained her degree, and was resident in London. Roles worked for the train operating company Southern as a train driver on services in South London. She represented Swansea Harriers at club level. Proudly Welsh, she was a popular member of Team Wales and Team GB due to her sense of humour and self-deprecating manner.

Roles was a five-times British discus throw champion after winning the British AAA Championships title in 2002, 2004, 2005, 2007 and 2009.

Her personal best throw was 62.89 metres, achieved in June 2003 in Loughborough. This placed her third on the British outdoor all-time list, behind Meg Ritchie and Venissa Head. It also ranked her in the World top 20.

Roles competed in the Commonwealth Games in Kuala Lumpur in 1998, in Manchester in 2002, in Melbourne, Australia in 2006 and Delhi in 2010. She competed in two Olympics - in Athens in 2004 and in Beijing in 2008.

On 16 July 2008, Roles appeared as Jonny Saunders' guest in the feature "Who's in the Locker, Cocker?" on Chris Evans Drivetime on BBC Radio 2.

Roles died suddenly and unexpectedly on 21 May 2017 aged 39.

== International competitions ==
Year	Competition	Venue	Position	Notes
Representing Great Britain and Wales
1995	European Junior Championships	Nyíregyháza, Hungary	12th	44.84 m
1996	World Junior Championships	Sydney, Australia	16th (q)	46.48 m
1997	European Junior Championships	Ljubljana, Slovenia	3rd	50.62 m
1998	Commonwealth Games	Kuala Lumpur, Malaysia	6th	54.10 m
1999	Universiade	Palma de Mallorca, Spain	15th (q)	54.82 m
1999	European U23 Championships	Gothenburg, Sweden	4th	55.37 m
2001	Universiade	Beijing, China	6th	55.02 m
2002	Commonwealth Games	Manchester, England	4th	57.65 m
2004	Olympic Games	Athens, Greece	18th (q)	58.83 m
2006	Commonwealth Games	Melbourne, Australia	6th	58.38 m
2008	Olympic Games	Beijing, China	27th (q)	57.44 m
2010	Commonwealth Games	Delhi, India	4th	57.99 m
