= Athletics at the 1990 Commonwealth Games – Women's discus throw =

Women's discus throw at the Commonwealth Games

The women's discus throw event at the 1990 Commonwealth Games was held on 28 January at the Mount Smart Stadium in Auckland.

== Results ==
Rank	Name	Nationality	#1	#2	#3	#4	#5	#6	Result	Notes
1st place, gold medalist(s)	Lisa-Marie Vizaniari	Australia	56.38	54.30	x	x	50.90	?	56.38	
2nd place, silver medalist(s)	Jackie McKernan	Northern Ireland							54.86	
3rd place, bronze medalist(s)	Astra Vitols	Australia	51.66	47.72	53.84	51.96	50.04	?	53.84	
4	Elizabeth Ryan	New Zealand							53.70	
5	Janette Picton	England	52.80	52.70	50.92	52.92	53.14	?	53.14	
6	Jane Aucott	England							52.20	
7	Vanessa French	Australia							51.20	
8	Sharon Andrews	England	47.76	x	51.18	x	48.14	46.50	51.18	
9	Michelle Brotherton	Canada							49.64	
10	Siulolovao Ikavuka	Tonga							48.62	
