= Alifatou Djibril =

Togolese athlete (born 1980)

Medal record

Women's athletics

Representing Togo

African Championships
Silver medal – second place	2004 Brazzaville	Discus throw
Bronze medal – third place	2004 Brazzaville	Shot put

Alifatou Djibril (born 13 February 1980) is a Togolese athlete specializing in the shot put and discus throw. She won multiple medals at the continental level.

== Competition record ==
Year	Competition	Venue	Position	Event	Notes
Representing Togo
2002	African Championships	Radès, Tunisia	6th	Shot put	14.41 m
2002	African Championships	Radès, Tunisia	4th	Discus throw	50.28 m
2003	All-Africa Games	Abuja, Nigeria	5th	Shot put	14.87 m
2003	All-Africa Games	Abuja, Nigeria	3rd	Discus throw	54.79 m
2003	Afro-Asian Games	Hyderabad, India	7th	Shot put	14.73 m
2003	Afro-Asian Games	Hyderabad, India	7th	Discus throw	52.00 m
2004	African Championships	Brazzaville, Republic of the Congo	3rd	Shot put	15.16 m
2004	African Championships	Brazzaville, Republic of the Congo	2nd	Discus throw	52.62 m
2008	African Championships	Addis Ababa, Ethiopia	8th	Shot put	13.48 m
2008	African Championships	Addis Ababa, Ethiopia	4th	Discus throw	45.78 m
2009	Jeux de la Francophonie	Beirut, Lebanon	4th	Discus throw	51.55 m
2011	All-Africa Games	Maputo, Mozambique	3rd	Discus throw	46.46 m
2012	African Championships	Porto-Novo, Benin	6th	Shot put	14.60 m
2012	African Championships	Porto-Novo, Benin	5th	Discus throw	48.41 m
2014	African Championships	Marrakesh, Morocco	5th	Shot put	14.89 m
2014	African Championships	Marrakesh, Morocco	5th	Discus throw	47.17 m

== Personal bests ==
- Shot put – 15.74 (Adelaide 2005) NR
- Discus throw – 56.16 (Sydney 2004) NR
- Hammer throw – 33.08 (Adelaide 2003)
