= Athletics at the 2011 All-Africa Games – Women's discus throw =

The women's discus throw event at the 2011 All-Africa Games was held on 14 September.

== Results ==
Rank	Athlete	Nationality	#1	#2	#3	#4	#5	#6	Result	Notes
1st place, gold medalist(s)	Kazai Suzanne Kragbé	Ivory Coast	55.59	56.56	53.40	x	x	52.15	56.56	
2nd place, silver medalist(s)	Elizna Naudé	South Africa	53.63	51.41	53.01	52.75	51.88	50.70	53.63	
3rd place, bronze medalist(s)	Alifatou Djibril	Togo	44.57	46.46	44.35	x	x	x	46.46	
4	Charlene Engelbrecht	Namibia	35.02	44.98	44.06	42.12	40.59	42.80	44.98	
5	Auriol Dongmo Mekemnang	Cameroon	39.55	37.70	36.77	37.15	40.34	x	40.34	
6	Estelle Louis	Mauritius	38.42	38.28	x	x	38.55	38.89	38.89	
7	Fanny Ossala	Republic of the Congo	x	28.45	x	x	27.67	x	28.45	
