= Athletics at the 1994 Commonwealth Games – Women's discus throw =

Women's discus throw at the Commonwealth Games

The women's discus throw event at the 1994 Commonwealth Games was held at the Centennial Stadium in Victoria, British Columbia.

== Results ==
Rank	Name	Nationality	#1	#2	#3	#4	#5	#6	Result	Notes
1st place, gold medalist(s)	Daniela Costian	Australia	63.72						63.72	GR
2nd place, silver medalist(s)	Beatrice Faumuina	New Zealand	x	53.92	x	53.32	54.62	57.12	57.12	
3rd place, bronze medalist(s)	Lizette Etsebeth	South Africa							55.74	
4	Sharon Andrews	England							55.34	
5	Jackie McKernan	Northern Ireland	x	52.16	x	x	54.86	52.34	54.86	
6	Lisa-Marie Vizaniari	Australia							53.88	
7	Debbie Callaway	England							53.16	
8	Theresa Brick	Canada							52.12	
9	Alison Lever	Australia							51.66	
10	Lorraine Shaw	England							50.50	
	Tea Ai Seng	Brunei							NM	
	Alison Grey	Scotland							NM	
