= Nadine Beckel =

German shot putter

Nadine Beckel (born 27 May 1977 in Schwerin) is a shot putter from Germany.

She won the silver medal at the 1996 World Junior Championships, finished ninth at the 2002 European Championships and eighth at the 2005 European Indoor Championships. She also competed at the 2003 World Championships and the 2004 Olympic Games without reaching the finals.

Her personal best throw is 18.59 metres, achieved in June 2003 in Mannheim. She has competed for the athletics clubs Schweriner SC and ASC Düsseldorf.

== Achievements ==
Year	Competition	Venue	Position	Event	Notes
Representing Germany
1996	World Junior Championships	Sydney, Australia	2nd	Shot put	16.39 m
1996	World Junior Championships	Sydney, Australia	4th	Discus	52.98 m
1997	European U23 Championships	Turku, Finland	11th	Shot put	15.51 m
1997	European U23 Championships	Turku, Finland	10th	Discus	50.58 m
1999	European U23 Championships	Gothenburg, Sweden	2nd	Shot put	17.15 m
1999	European U23 Championships	Gothenburg, Sweden	2nd	Discus	57.75 m
2002	European Championships	Munich, Germany	9th	Shot put	18.18 m
2004	Olympic Games	Athens, Greece	22nd	Shot put	17.11 m
