= Athletics at the 2002 Commonwealth Games – Women's discus throw =

Discus throw

Women's discus throw at the Commonwealth Games

The women's discus throw event at the 2002 Commonwealth Games was held on 26–27 July.

== Results ==
Rank	Athlete	Nationality	#1	#2	#3	#4	#5	#6	Result	Notes
1st place, gold medalist(s)	Beatrice Faumuina	New Zealand	58.24	60.83	x	x	60.50	x	60.83	
2nd place, silver medalist(s)	Neelam Jaswant Singh	India	54.85	56.04	56.91	53.18	58.49	54.75	58.49	
3rd place, bronze medalist(s)	Shelley Newman	England	56.72	56.64	58.13	57.25	x	57.92	58.13	
4	Philippa Roles	Wales	53.91	56.39	56.92	56.50	56.66	57.65	57.65	
5	Alison Lever	Australia	57.25	55.78	56.38	55.39	57.13	x	57.25	
6	Elizna Naudé	South Africa	55.41	51.82	53.03	52.95	x	54.92	55.41	
7	Claire Smithson	England	x	55.03	52.84	x	x	x	55.03	PB
8	Monique Nacsa	Australia	51.57	53.34	54.46	51.61	54.45	52.73	54.46	
9	Vivian Chukwuemeka	Nigeria	50.06	53.44	53.20				53.44	
10	Jackie McKernan	Northern Ireland	50.45	x	x				50.45	
11	Melehifo Uhi	Tonga	47.52	49.60	x				49.60	
12	Mellisa Gibbons	Jamaica	41.24	47.38	44.10				47.38	
	Emma Carpenter	England	x	x	x				NM	
