= 2006 African Championships in Athletics – Women's discus throw =

The women's discus throw event at the 2006 African Championships in Athletics was held at the Stade Germain Comarmond on August 11, 2006.

== Results ==
Distances shown are in meters.

Rank	Name	Nationality	#1	#2	#3	#4	#5	#6	Result	Notes
1st place, gold medalist(s)	Elizna Naudé	South Africa	53.21	52.87	53.66	52.71	54.04	55.42	55.42	
2nd place, silver medalist(s)	Vivian Chukwuemeka	Nigeria	x	49.12	49.63	x	x	x	49.63	
3rd place, bronze medalist(s)	Suzanne Kragbé	Ivory Coast	x	42.71	43.02	x	46.72	49.05	49.05	
4	Mirella Pullut	Mauritius	x	36.78	35.70	x	x	37.83	37.83	
	Hayat El Ghazi	Morocco							DQ	Doping
	Marthe Ayangma	Cameroon							DNS	
	Lindy Leveau	Seychelles							DNS	
