= 1998 World Junior Championships in Athletics – Women's shot put =

The women's shot put event at the 1998 World Junior Championships in Athletics was held in Annecy, France, at Parc des Sports on 30 and 31 July.

== Medalists ==
Gold	Nadezhda Ostapchuk; Belarus
Silver	Du Xianhui; China
Bronze	Nadine Banse; Germany

== Results ==
=== Final ===
31 July

Rank	Name	Nationality	Attempts						Result	Notes
Rank	Name	Nationality	1	2	3	4	5	6	Result	Notes
1st place, gold medalist(s)	Nadezhda Ostapchuk	Belarus	16.24	16.10	16.02	x	17.45	18.23	18.23	
2nd place, silver medalist(s)	Du Xianhui	China	16.61	17.20	16.29	16.62	x	17.69	17.69	
3rd place, bronze medalist(s)	Nadine Banse	Germany	16.44	16.49	x	16.67	x	16.94	16.94	
4	Lucica Ciobanu	Romania	15.93	15.24	15.85	15.78	15.22	15.60	15.93	
5	Kathleen Kluge	Germany	13.46	15.31	15.60	15.47	15.23	15.82	15.82	
6	Wioletta Potępa	Poland	x	14.86	14.81	14.98	x	15.24	15.24	
7	Mari Wahlman	Finland	15.13	15.16	14.73	14.74	14.62	15.07	15.16	
8	Sumi Ichioka	Japan	15.05	13.70	14.07	14.72	14.33	14.83	15.05	
9	Alina Frunza	Romania	14.70	x	14.69				14.70	
10	Lisa Griebel	United States	14.54	14.27	14.03				14.54	
11	Veronica Abrahamse	South Africa	14.41	14.18	14.36				14.41	
12	Nataliya Bessmertnykh	Uzbekistan	13.97	14.23	13.72				14.23	

=== Qualifications ===
30 Jul

==== Group A ====
Rank	Name	Nationality	Attempts			Result	Notes
Rank	Name	Nationality	1	2	3	Result	Notes
1	Nadezhda Ostapchuk	Belarus	16.80	-	-	16.80	Q
2	Nadine Banse	Germany	16.07	-	-	16.07	Q
3	Mari Wahlman	Finland	15.01	14.25	15.72	15.72	Q
4	Veronica Abrahamse	South Africa	15.42	14.55	x	15.42	q
5	Alina Frunza	Romania	14.87	14.44	15.32	15.32	q
6	Sumi Ichioka	Japan	14.77	14.26	14.11	14.77	q
7	Nataliya Bessmertnykh	Uzbekistan	13.82	14.61	13.75	14.61	q
8	Katrina Steele	Australia	13.89	x	14.17	14.17	
9	Julie Dunkley	United Kingdom	x	13.71	13.82	13.82	
10	Krista Keir	United States	12.77	13.52	13.57	13.57	
11	Amadji Ndiaye	France	x	x	12.85	12.85	

==== Group B ====
Rank	Name	Nationality	Attempts			Result	Notes
Rank	Name	Nationality	1	2	3	Result	Notes
1	Du Xianhui	China	15.85	-	-	15.85	Q
2	Kathleen Kluge	Germany	15.46	15.56	-	15.56	Q
3	Lucica Ciobanu	Romania	15.08	14.98	15.24	15.24	q
4	Wioletta Potępa	Poland	x	15.13	14.82	15.13	q
5	Lisa Griebel	United States	14.61	14.24	14.21	14.61	q
6	Oksana Gromova	Russia	13.33	14.50	13.24	14.50	
7	Martina Lulic	Croatia	13.64	14.44	14.13	14.44	
8	Mojca Crnigoj	Slovenia	13.27	14.32	13.95	14.32	
9	Iríni Terzóglou	Greece	13.98	14.05	14.27	14.27	
10	Debra Turnbull	Australia	13.87	x	13.89	13.89	
11	Magnolia Iglesias	Spain	x	12.86	13.88	13.88	

== Participation ==
According to an unofficial count, 22 athletes from 18 countries participated in the event.

- Australia (2)
- Belarus (1)
- China (1)
- Croatia (1)
- Finland (1)
- France (1)
- Germany (2)
- Greece (1)
- Japan (1)
- Poland (1)
- Romania (2)
- Russia (1)
- Slovenia (1)
- South Africa (1)
- Spain (1)
- United Kingdom (1)
- United States (2)
- Uzbekistan (1)
