= 2010 African Championships in Athletics – Women's discus throw =

Competition at the 2010 African Championship in Athletics

The women's discus throw at the 2010 African Championships in Athletics was held on July 30.

== Results ==
Rank	Athlete	Nationality	#1	#2	#3	#4	#5	#6	Result	Notes
1st place, gold medalist(s)	Elizna Naudé	South Africa	55.29	55.17	X	X	54.60	56.74	56.74	
2nd place, silver medalist(s)	Kazai Suzanne Kragbé	Ivory Coast	54.72	X	X	X	54.75	55.53	55.53	
3rd place, bronze medalist(s)	Sarah Hasseib Dardiri	Egypt	43.35	46.51	44.71	45.13	42.95	45.29	46.51	
4	Caroline Cherotich	Kenya	38.75	32.99	37.71	X	35.06	36.12	38.75	SB
5	Cicilia Kiplagat	Kenya	X	37.06	X	X	37.87	38.23	38.23	SB
6	Pascaline Kipsang	Kenya	X	35.87	X	33.61	X	X	35.87	
7	Mersit Gebereegziabher	Ethiopia	32.81	X	X	32.89	X	32.59	32.89	
8	Cicilia Matee	Tanzania	X	31.29	31.77	X	32.87	30.03	32.87	
	Linda Benin	Ghana							DNS	
