= Athletics at the 2001 Summer Universiade – Women's discus throw =

The women's discus throw event at the 2001 Summer Universiade was held at the Workers Stadium in Beijing, China on 29 and 30 September.

== Medalists ==
Gold	Silver	Bronze
Li Qiumei; China	Li Yanfeng; China	Mélina Robert; France

== Results ==
=== Qualification ===
Rank	Group	Athlete	Nationality	Result	Notes
1	A	Liudmila Starovoytova	Belarus	59.17	
2	B	Li Qiumei	China	57.95	
3	B	Mélina Robert	France	56.57	
4	A	Li Yanfeng	China	56.39	
5	B	Philippa Roles	Great Britain	56.28	
6	B	Elizna Naudé	South Africa	55.99	
7	B	Oksana Esipchuk	Russia	54.10	
8	B	Katja Schreiber	Germany	54.10	
9	B	Christy Thiel	Australia	53.80	
10	B	Ileana Brandusoiu	Romania	53.45	
11	A	Krista Keir	United States	53.08	
12	A	Lacramioara Ionescu	Romania	52.45	
13	A	Rita Lora	Spain	50.79	
14	A	Vera Begić	Croatia	50.69	
15	B	Irache Quintanal	Spain	49.86	
16	A	Tina McDonald	Canada	49.60	
17	B	Aubrey Schmitt	United States	47.93	
18	A	Veronica Abrahamse	South Africa	41.46	
19	?	Élise Fanlomé	Togo	37.12	

=== Final ===
Rank	Athlete	Nationality	Result	Notes
1st place, gold medalist(s)	Li Qiumei	China	61.66	
2nd place, silver medalist(s)	Li Yanfeng	China	60.50	
3rd place, bronze medalist(s)	Mélina Robert	France	58.04	
4	Liudmila Starovoytova	Belarus	57.20	
5	Elizna Naudé	South Africa	56.46	
6	Philippa Roles	Great Britain	55.02	
7	Ileana Brandusoiu	Romania	54.22	
8	Lacramioara Ionescu	Romania	53.88	
9	Oksana Esipchuk	Russia	53.39	
10	Krista Keir	United States	52.20	
11	Christy Thiel	Australia	50.69	
	Katja Schreiber	Germany	NM	
