= 1999 European Athletics U23 Championships – Women's shot put =

The women's shot put event at the 1999 European Athletics U23 Championships was held in Gothenburg, Sweden, at Ullevi on 30 July 1999.

== Medalists ==
| Gold | Yelena Ivanenko; Belarus |
| Silver | Nadine Beckel; Germany |
| Bronze | Assunta Legnante; Italy |

== Results ==
=== Final ===
30 July

| Rank | Name | Nationality | Attempts | | | | | | Result | Notes |
| Rank | Name | Nationality | 1 | 2 | 3 | 4 | 5 | 6 | Result | Notes |
|---|---|---|---|---|---|---|---|---|---|---|
| 1st place, gold medalist(s) | Yelena Ivanenko | Belarus | 16.54 | x | x | x | 17.27 | x | 17.27 | |
| 2nd place, silver medalist(s) | Nadine Beckel | Germany | 16.95 | x | 16.82 | 16.70 | 16.94 | 17.15 | 17.15 | |
| 3rd place, bronze medalist(s) | Assunta Legnante | Italy | 14.22 | x | 15.95 | x | x | 16.53 | 16.53 | |
| 4 | Nadine Banse | Germany | x | 15.86 | 16.46 | 16.10 | 16.52 | x | 16.52 | |
| 5 | Lucica Ciobanu | Romania | 16.51 | x | 15.88 | 16.02 | 16.41 | 16.17 | 16.51 | |
| 6 | Alina Frunza | Romania | 15.98 | x | 16.18 | 15.75 | 16.15 | 15.59 | 16.18 | |
| 7 | Anca Vîlceanu | Romania | 15.75 | 15.92 | 15.66 | x | 15.77 | 15.84 | 15.92 | |
| 8 | Claudia Venghaus | Germany | 15.12 | 15.83 | x | 15.52 | x | x | 15.83 | |
| 9 | Julie Dunkley | Great Britain | 15.57 | 15.13 | 15.43 | | | | 15.57 | |
| 10 | Irache Quintanal | Spain | 14.79 | 14.91 | 14.92 | | | | 14.92 | |
| 11 | Magnolia Iglesias | Spain | 12.58 | 14.36 | x | | | | 14.36 | |

== Participation ==
According to an unofficial count, 11 athletes from 6 countries participated in the event.

- Belarus (1)
- Germany (3)
- Great Britain (1)
- Italy (1)
- Romania (3)
- Spain (2)
