= Athletics at the 2007 All-Africa Games – Women's discus throw =

The women's discus throw at the 2007 All-Africa Games was held on July 21.

== Results ==
Rank	Athlete	Nationality	Result	Notes
1st place, gold medalist(s)	Elizna Naude	South Africa	58.40	
2nd place, silver medalist(s)	Monia Kari	Tunisia	55.15	
3rd place, bronze medalist(s)	Vivian Chukwuemeka	Nigeria	52.52	
4	Suzanne Kragbé	Ivory Coast	51.43	
5	Simoné du Toit	South Africa	51.12	
6	Lindy Leveau	Seychelles	42.47	
