= Veronica Abrahamse =

South African shot putter (born 1980)

Medal record

Women's athletics

Representing South Africa

African Championships
| Gold medal – first place | 1998 Dakar | Shot put |
| Bronze medal – third place | 2008 Addis Ababa | Shot put |

Commonwealth Games
| Bronze medal – third place | 2002 Manchester | Shot Put |

Johanna "Veronica" Abrahamse (born 18 March 1980) is a South African athlete specializing in the shot put. She won bronze medals at the 1998 and 2002 Commonwealth Games, as well as many medals on continental level. Her personal best put is 17.76 metres from 2002.

== Competition record ==
| Year | Competition | Venue | Position | Event | Notes |
Representing South Africa
| 1997 | African Junior Championships | Ibadan, Nigeria | 1st | Shot put | 15.80 m |
| 1997 | African Junior Championships | Ibadan, Nigeria | 3rd | Javelin (old spec.) | 47.52 m |
| 1998 | World Junior Championships | Annecy, France | 11th | Shot put | 14.41 m |
| 1998 | World Junior Championships | Annecy, France | 29th (q) | Javelin (old spec.) | 37.09 m |
| 1998 | African Championships | Dakar, Senegal | 1st | Shot put | 15.07 m |
| 1998 | Commonwealth Games | Kuala Lumpur, Malaysia | 3rd | Shot put | 16.52 m |
| 1999 | All-Africa Games | Johannesburg, South Africa | 2nd | Shot put | 16.53 m |
| 2001 | Universiade | Beijing, China | 10th | Shot put | 16.18 m |
| 2001 | Universiade | Beijing, China | 18th (q) | Discus throw | 41.46 m |
| 2002 | Commonwealth Games | Manchester, United Kingdom | 3rd | Shot put | 16.77 m |
| 2003 | All-Africa Games | Abuja, Nigeria | 2nd | Shot put | 15.77 m |
| 2003 | Afro-Asian Games | Hyderabad, India | 4th | Shot put | 16.60 m |
| 2007 | All-Africa Games | Algiers, Algeria | 3rd | Shot put | 15.75 m |
| 2008 | African Championships | Addis Ababa, Ethiopia | 3rd | Shot put | 16.00 m |
| 2011 | All-Africa Games | Maputo, Mozambique | 2nd | Shot put | 15.70 m |
