= 2004 African Championships in Athletics – Women's shot put =

The women's shot put event at the 2004 African Championships in Athletics was held in Brazzaville, Republic of the Congo on July 15.

== Results ==
Rank	Name	Nationality	Result	Notes
1st place, gold medalist(s)	Wafaa Ismail Baghdadi	Egypt	15.53	
2nd place, silver medalist(s)	Amel Ben Khaled	Tunisia	15.45	
3rd place, bronze medalist(s)	Alifatou Djibril	Togo	15.16	
4	Moselhy Zoghary Heba	Egypt	14.58	
