= Hyginus Anugo =

Nigerian Olympic runner (1977–2000)

Hyginus Anugo (29 November 1977 – 7 September 2000) was a Nigerian sprinter specializing in the 400 metres and a contender for the 2000 Summer Olympics. Anugo had earned a silver medal in the West African Championships and two gold medals in the African U20 Championships in the years before his recruitment to the Nigerian Olympic team. He also competed in the 400 m at the 1996 World U20 Championships.

On 7 September 2000, Anugo was killed after being hit by a car in Sydney, Australia, where he had recently completed team trials in preparation for the Olympics. After training with the Nigerian team in Adelaide, Australia, Anugo was ultimately not selected during final selections. He had been set to return to Nigeria on 4 September 2000, but for unknown reasons chose to remain in Australia, where he ultimately died. The Nigerian flag was flown at half mast in the Olympic Village in response to Anugo's passing.

At the time of his death, Anugo was engaged to fellow Olympic runner Glory Alozie.
