= Athletics at the 1994 Commonwealth Games – Women's shot put =

Women's shot put at the Commonwealth Games

The women's shot put event at the 1994 Commonwealth Games was held at the Centennial Stadium in Victoria, British Columbia.

== Results ==
Rank	Name	Nationality	#1	#2	#3	#4	#5	#6	Result	Notes
1st place, gold medalist(s)	Judy Oakes	England	17.79	x	17.71	18.16	18.11		18.16	
2nd place, silver medalist(s)	Myrtle Augee	England	16.35	17.03	17.04	x	17.05	17.64	17.64	
3rd place, bronze medalist(s)	Lisa-Marie Vizaniari	Australia				16.37	16.61		16.61	
4	Georgette Reed	Canada						16.45	16.45	
5	Christine King	New Zealand							16.27	
6	Maggie Lynes	England	15.84	16.10	16.21				16.23	
7	Alison Grey	Scotland	13.88	15.25					15.25	
8	Shannon Kekula-Kristiansen	Canada							14.98	
9	Beatrice Faumuina	New Zealand	14.20	14.40	14.80				14.80	
10	Samantha Cox	Australia							14.52	
11	Erin Breaugh	Canada	12.67	13.44	14.25				14.25	
12	Iammo Launa	Papua New Guinea							12.71	
13	Tea Ai Seng	Brunei							12.61	
	Daniela Costian	Australia							DNS	
	Laverne Eve	Bahamas							DNS	
	Jacqueline McKernan	Northern Ireland							DNS	
