= Elizna Naudé =

South African discus thrower

Personal information
- Born: 14 September 1978 (age 48) Vereeniging, South Africa
- Height: 1.80 m (5 ft 11 in)

Sport
- Country: South Africa
- Sport: Athletics
- Event: Discus throw
- Club: TuksSport, Pretoria
Medal record
Women's athletics
Representing South Africa
Commonwealth Games
Gold medal – first place	2006 Melbourne	Discus Throw
All-Africa Games
Gold medal – first place	2003 Abuja	Discus throw
Gold medal – first place	2007 Algiers	Discus throw
Silver medal – second place	2011 Maputo	Discus throw
Bronze medal – third place	1999 Johannesburg	Discus throw
African Championships
Gold medal – first place	1998 Dakar	Discus throw
Gold medal – first place	2004 Brazzaville	Discus throw
Gold medal – first place	2006 Bambous	Discus throw
Gold medal – first place	2008 Addis Ababa	Discus throw
Gold medal – first place	2010 Nairobi	Discus throw
Silver medal – second place	2012 Benin	Discus throw
Bronze medal – third place	2002 Radès	Discus throw

Elizna Naudé (born 14 September 1978) is a South African discus thrower.

Her personal best throw is 64.87 metres, achieved in March 2007 in Stellenbosch. She is a teacher at Vaalpark Primary School, Sasolburg, South Africa.

She is an alumna of the University of Pretoria.

== International competitions ==
Year	Competition	Venue	Position	Notes
Representing South Africa
1997	African Junior Championships	Ibadan, Nigeria	1st	46.16 m
1998	African Championships	Dakar, Senegal	1st	50.28 m
1998	World Cup	Johannesburg, South Africa	7th	51.39 m
1999	Universiade	Palma de Mallorca, Spain	14th (q)	55.15 m
1999	All-Africa Games	Johannesburg, South Africa	3rd	53.26 m
2001	Universiade	Beijing, China	5th	56.46 m
2002	Commonwealth Games	Manchester, United Kingdom	6th	55.41 m
2002	African Championships	Radès, Tunisia	3rd	51.89 m
2003	Universiade	Daegu, South Korea	5th	56.40 m
2003	All-Africa Games	Abuja, Nigeria	1st	57.44 m (CR)
2003	Afro-Asian Games	Hyderabad, India	4th	56.93 m
2004	African Championships	Brazzaville, Republic of the Congo	1st	57.50 m
2004	Olympic Games	Athens, Greece	20th (q)	58.74 m
2005	World Championships	Helsinki, Finland	13th (q)	58.93 m
2006	Commonwealth Games	Melbourne, Australia	1st	61.55 m
2006	African Championships	Bambous, Mauritius	1st	55.42 m
2006	World Cup	Athens, Greece	8th	56.11 m
2007	All-Africa Games	Algiers, Algeria	1st	58.40 m (CR)
2008	African Championships	Addis Ababa, Ethiopia	1st	55.34 m
2008	Olympic Games	Beijing, China	20th (q)	58.75 m
2009	World Championships	Berlin, Germany	16th (q)	59.67 m
2010	African Championships	Nairobi, Kenya	1st	56.74 m
2010	Commonwealth Games	Delhi, India	7th	57.61 m
2011	All-Africa Games	Maputo, Mozambique	2nd	53.63 m
2012	African Championships	Porto-Novo, Benin	2nd	55.88 m
2014	African Championships	Marrakesh, Morocco	6th	44.44 m
