= 1996 African Championships in Athletics =

1996 African Championships
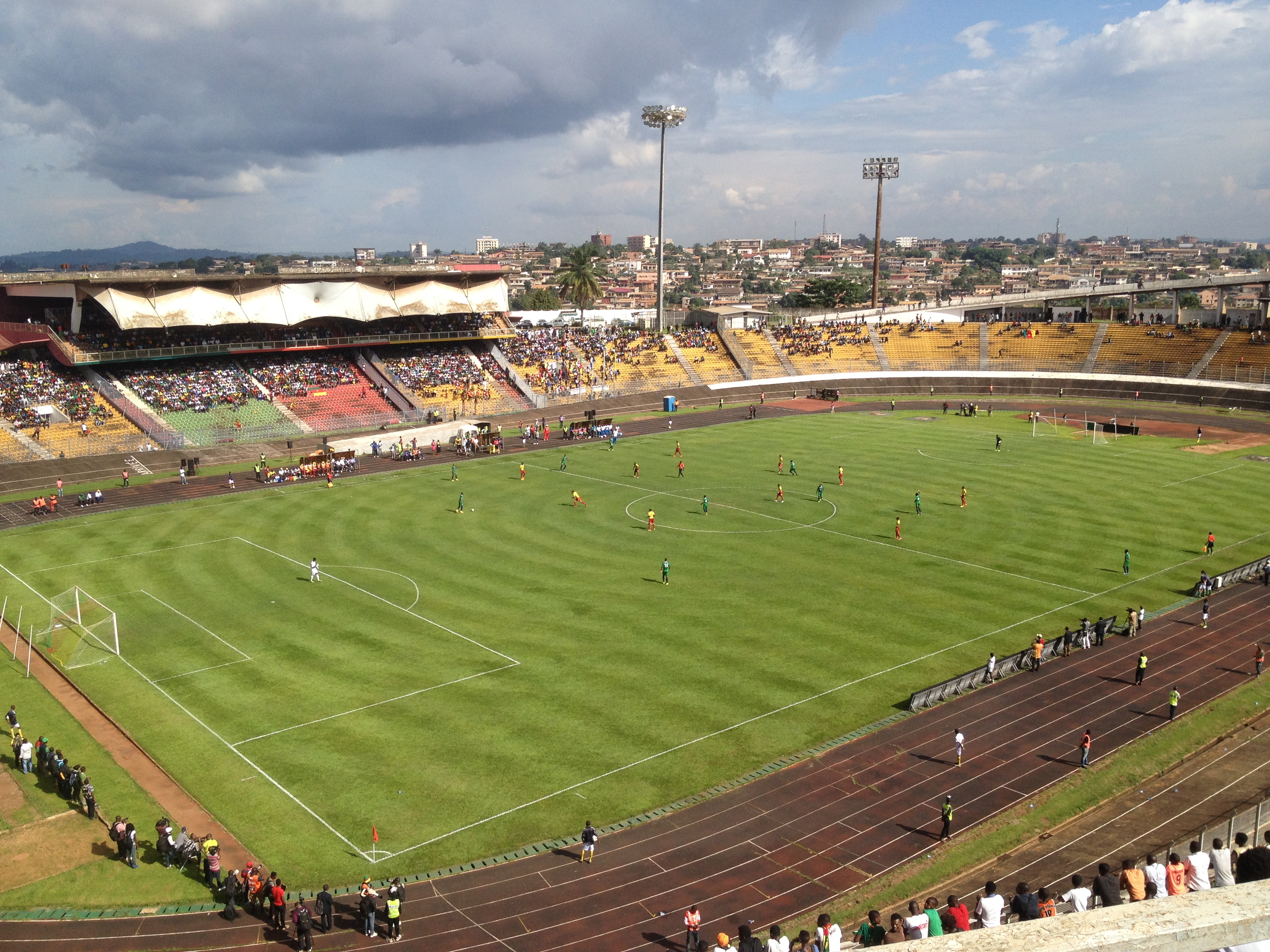
- Host stadium in Yaoundé
- Dates: 13–16 June
- Host city: Yaoundé, Cameroon
- Venue: Stade Ahmadou Ahidjo
- Events: 40
- Participation: 307 athletes from 33 nations

The 10th African Championships in Athletics were held in Yaoundé, Cameroon between 13 and 16 June 1996 at the Stade Ahmadou Ahidjo.

== Medal summary ==
=== Men's events ===
Event	Gold		Silver		Bronze	
100 metres (wind: -1.8 m/s)	Seun Ogunkoya; Nigeria	10.45	Benjamin Sirimou; Cameroon	10.54	Sunday Emmanuel; Nigeria	10.66
200 metres (wind: +1.2 m/s)	Oumar Loum; Senegal	20.70	Joseph Loua; Guinea	20.80	Justice Dipeba; Botswana	20.90
400 metres	Ibrahima Wade; Senegal	45.75	Simon Kemboi; Kenya	46.00	Samson Kipchirchir Yego; Kenya	46.14
800 metres	Fred Onyancha; Kenya	1:46.69	Adem Hecini; Algeria	1:47.17	Kipkemboi Lagat; Kenya	1:47.35
1500 metres	Moses Kigen; Kenya	3:39.78	Sammy Rono; Kenya	3:40.47	Gilbert Mvuyekure; Burundi	3:47.95
5000 metres	Paul Koech; Kenya	13:35.13	Simon Chemoiywo; Kenya	13:35.13	Faustin Ngézahayo; Burundi	13:49.49
10,000 metres	Stephen Kiogora; Kenya	29:16.40	William Kipchumba; Kenya	29:22.30	Isidore Nzigiyimana; Burundi	30:14.40
3000 metre steeplechase	Kipkemboi Cheruiyot; Kenya	8:38.72	Faustin Ngézahayo; Burundi	8:39.38	Thomas Toyi; Burkina Faso	8:48.99
110 metres hurdles (wind: +1.2 m/s)	William Erese; Nigeria	13.7	Moses Oyiki Orode; Nigeria	13.8	Judex Lefou; Mauritius	13.9
400 metres hurdles	Ibou Faye; Senegal	49.60	Ferrins Pieterse; South Africa	49.95	El Hafni Abdel Maksoud Ibrahim; Egypt	50.74
4 × 100 metres relay	Nigeria	39.7	Senegal	39.9	Cameroon; Aimé-Issa Nthépé; Benjamin Sirimou; Alfred Moussambani; Claude Toukéné-Guébogo	40.0
4 × 400 metres relay	Senegal; Moustapha Diarra; Abubakry Dia; Hachim Ndiaye; Ibou Faye	3:03.44	Kenya	3:03.53	Mauritius; Gilbert Hashan; Desiré Pierre-Louis; Rudy Tirvengadum; Eric Milazar	3:07.20
20 kilometre road walk	Hatem Ghoula; Tunisia	1:29:48	David Kimutai; Kenya	1:30:05	Mohieddine Béni Daoud; Tunisia	1:31:10
High jump	Khemraj Naiko; Mauritius	2.16	Anthony Idiata; Nigeria	2.16	Olivier Sanou; Burkina Faso	2.13
Pole vault	Anis Riahi; Tunisia	4.60	Hassan Farouk Sayed; Egypt	4.20		
Long jump	Anis Gallali; Tunisia	7.81	Cheikh Touré; Senegal	7.79	Pa Modou Gai; Gambia	7.64
Triple jump	Paul Nioze; Seychelles	16.52	Oluyemi Sule; Nigeria	16.17	Roger Martial Ngouloubi; Congo	15.16
Shot put	Henk Booysen; South Africa	17.34	Athanase Oloko; Cameroon	14.98	Serge Doh; Ivory Coast	14.84
Discus throw	Serge Doh; Ivory Coast	51.92	Christian Messi Alaga; Cameroon	48.58	Athanase Oloko; Cameroon	46.72
Hammer throw	Hakim Toumi; Algeria	69.32	Samir Haouam; Algeria	65.32	Yacine Louail; Algeria	52.34
Javelin throw	Pius Bazighe; Nigeria	74.78	Louis Fouché; South Africa	74.54	Maher Ridane; Tunisia	72.60
Decathlon	Anis Riahi; Tunisia	7257	Hassan Farouk Sayed; Egypt	6788	Sid Ali Sabour; Algeria	5071

=== Women's events ===
Event	Gold		Silver		Bronze	
100 metres (wind: -0.3 m/s)	Georgette Nkoma; Cameroon	11.67	Marliese Steyn; South Africa	11.69	Myriam Léonie Mani; Cameroon	11.92
200 metres (wind: +1.1 m/s)	Georgette Nkoma; Cameroon	23.1	Marliese Steyn; South Africa	23.3	Myriam Léonie Mani; Cameroon	23.5
400 metres	Saidat Onanuga; Nigeria	52.85	Grace Birungi; Uganda	53.40	Alimata Koné; Ivory Coast	54.31
800 metres	Naomi Mugo; Kenya	2:02.80	Léontine Tsiba; Congo	2:09.10	Adama Njie; Gambia	2:10.10
1500 metres	Naomi Mugo; Kenya	4:12.30	Stéphanie Nicole Zanga; Cameroon	4:34.20	Léontine Tsiba; Congo	4:35.60
5000 metres	Florence Djépé; Cameroon	17:59.32	Marie Python; Cameroon	18:14.40	Cathreen Ngwang; Cameroon	19:27.39
100 metres hurdles (wind: -0.2 m/s)	Glory Alozie; Nigeria	13.62	Lana Uys; South Africa	13.78	Mame Tacko Diouf; Senegal	14.21
400 metres hurdles	Saidat Onanuga; Nigeria	56.64	Lana Uys; South Africa	57.05	Kleintjie Mogotsi; South Africa	60.19
4 × 100 metres relay	Cameroon	44.7	Ivory Coast	45.5	Senegal	46.8
4 × 400 metres relay	Nigeria; Saidat Onanuga; Calister Uba; Caroline Avbovbede; Folashade Ogundemi	3:39.2	Cameroon; Myriam Leonie Mani; Mireille Nguimgo; Madeleine Ndongo Mbazoa; Claudine Komgang	3:40.5	Gabon; Genevieve Obone; Fine Azogoua; Patricia Obone; Diane Zancy	3:54.8
5000 metre track walk	Dounia Kara; Algeria	23:15.80	Nagwa Ibrahim Ali; Egypt	24:05.40	Monica Akoth; Kenya	24:05.70
High jump	Irène Tiendrébéogo; Burkina Faso	1.84	Lolita Nack; Cameroon	1.80	Jeanine Blé; Ivory Coast	1.75
Long jump	Grace Umelo; Nigeria	6.13	Béryl Laramé; Seychelles	5.98	Kéné Ndoye; Senegal	5.85
Triple jump	Kéné Ndoye; Senegal	12.99	Abiola Williams; Nigeria	12.68	Françoise Mbango Etone; Cameroon	12.51
Shot put	Hanan Ahmed Khaled; Egypt	14.47	Wafa Ismail El Baghdadi; Egypt	14.24	Oumou Traoré; Mali	12.84
Discus throw	Monia Kari; Tunisia	53.00	Caroline Fournier; Mauritius	48.80	Felicia Nkiru Ojiego; Nigeria	45.58
Javelin throw	Fatma Zouhour Toumi; Tunisia	51.88	Lindy Leveaux; Seychelles	42.24	Monique Djikada; Cameroon	40.78
Heptathlon	Caroline Kola; Kenya	5270	Anne-Marie Mouri-Nkeng; Cameroon	4372	Adélaïde Koudougnon; Ivory Coast	3453

== Medal table ==
Rank	Nation	Gold	Silver	Bronze	Total
1	Nigeria (NGR)	9	4	2	15
2	Kenya (KEN)	8	6	3	17
3	Tunisia (TUN)	6	0	2	8
4	Senegal (SEN)	5	2	3	10
5	Cameroon (CMR)	4	8	7	19
6	Algeria (ALG)	2	2	2	6
7	South Africa (SAF)	1	6	1	8
8	Egypt (EGY)	1	4	1	6
9	Seychelles (SEY)	1	2	0	3
10	Ivory Coast (CIV)	1	1	4	6
11	Mauritius (MRI)	1	1	2	4
12	Burkina Faso (BUR)	1	0	2	3
13	Burundi (BDI)	0	1	3	4
14	Congo (CGO)	0	1	2	3
15	Guinea (GUI)	0	1	0	1
15	Uganda (UGA)	0	1	0	1
17	Gambia (GAM)	0	0	2	2
18	Botswana (BOT)	0	0	1	1
18	Gabon (GAB)	0	0	1	1
18	Mali (MLI)	0	0	1	1
Totals (20 entries)		40	40	39	119
