= Sunday Emmanuel (athlete) =

Nigerian sprinter

Medal record

Men's athletics

Representing Nigeria

African Championships
Gold medal – first place	2002 Radès	4×100 m
Silver medal – second place	1998 Dakar	200 m
Silver medal – second place	1998 Dakar	4×100 m
Bronze medal – third place	1996 Yaoundé	100 m

Sunday Emmanuel (8 October 1978 – 15 January 2004 in Kaduna) was a Nigerian athlete who specialised in sprinting events. He represented his country in the 100 metres at the 2000 Summer Olympics reaching the semi-finals.

He was the runner-up in both the 100 m and 200 metres at the 1995 African Junior Athletics Championships, then won both events at the 1997 edition. His foremost individual medals were a 100 m bronze medal at the 1996 African Championships in Athletics and a silver in the 200 m at the 1998 African Championships in Athletics.

His personal bests are 10.06 for the 100 m, 20.45 for the 200 m and 6.52 for the 60 metres.

He died after an auto-accident in Kaduna, Nigeria.

== Competition record ==
Year	Competition	Venue	Position	Event	Notes
Representing Nigeria
1995	African Junior Championships	Bouaké, Ivory Coast	2nd	100 m	10.42
1995	African Junior Championships	Bouaké, Ivory Coast	2nd	200 m	20.98
1996	African Championships	Yaoundé, Cameroon	3rd	100 m	10.66
1996	World Junior Championships	Sydney, Australia	4th	200 m	21.11 (wind: -1.6 m/s)
1997	African Junior Championships	Ibadan, Nigeria	1st	100 m	10.55
1997	African Junior Championships	Ibadan, Nigeria	1st	200 m	21.12
1998	African Championships	Dakar, Senegal	2nd	200 m	20.45
1999	World Championships	Seville, Spain	49th (qf)	200 m	21.12
1999	All-Africa Games	Johannesburg, South Africa	5th	200 m	20.75
2000	Olympic Games	Sydney, Australia	14th (sf)	100 m	10.45
2000	Olympic Games	Sydney, Australia	8th (h)	4 × 100 m relay	38.97
2001	World Indoor Championships	Edmonton, Canada	52nd (h)	60 m	7.18
2001	World Championships	Edmonton, Canada	10th (h)	4 × 100 m relay	39.10
2002	Commonwealth Games	Manchester, United Kingdom	6th	4 × 100 m relay	39.01
2002	African Championships	Radès, Tunisia	1st	4 × 100 m relay	39.76

== Personal bests ==
Outdoor

- 100 metres – 10.06 (Enugu 1997)
- 200 metres – 20.45 (-0.9 m/s) (Dakar 1998)

Indoor

- 60 metres – 6.52 (Chemnitz 2000)
- 200 metres – 21.20 (Piraeus 1999)
