= 2004 African Championships in Athletics – Women's discus throw =

The women's discus throw event at the 2004 African Championships in Athletics was held in Brazzaville, Republic of the Congo on July 16.

== Results ==
Rank	Name	Nationality	Result	Notes
1st place, gold medalist(s)	Elizna Naudé	South Africa	57.50	
2nd place, silver medalist(s)	Alifatou Djibril	Togo	52.62	
3rd place, bronze medalist(s)	Heba Moselhy Zoghary	Egypt	50.58	
4	Oumou Traoré	Mali	43.30	
5	Lucie Bouala Mboussi	Republic of the Congo	29.62	
