= 2010 African Championships in Athletics – Women's shot put =

The women's shot put at the 2010 African Championships in Athletics was held on August 1.

== Results ==
Rank	Athlete	Nationality	#1	#2	#3	#4	#5	#6	Result	Notes
1st place, gold medalist(s)	Mirian Ibekwe	Nigeria	13.24	13.67	13.23	X	13.35	13.29	13.67	
2nd place, silver medalist(s)	Priscilla Isiao	Kenya	12.75	13.62	12.24	X	12.50	13.29	13.62	SB
3rd place, bronze medalist(s)	Doris Ratsimbazafy	Madagascar	13.42	12.79	13.56	12.75	X	X	13.56	
4	Jackline Nyongesa	Kenya	10.78	11.27	11.94	12.15	12.23	12.05	12.23	SB
5	Linda Ngendo Oseso	Kenya	12.03	11.45	11.85	11.87	10.96	X	12.03	
6	Zouina Bouzebra	Algeria	11.67	11.53	X	X	11.58	X	11.67	
7	Roman Abera	Ethiopia	10.19	10.79	10.29	11.52	11.09	X	11.52	
8	Zewdnesh Beshah	Ethiopia	9.98	10.48	9.56	10.12	10.31	9.86	10.48	
