= Rudy Tirvengadum =

Mauritian sprinter

Personal information
- Nationality: Mauritian
- Born: 16 January 1975 (age 51)

Sport
- Sport: Sprinting
- Event: 4 × 400 metres relay
Medal record
Men's athletics
Representing Mauritius
African Championships
Bronze medal – third place	1996 Yaoundé	4×400 m

Rudy Tirvengadum (born 16 January 1975) is a Mauritian sprinter. He competed in the men's 4 × 400 metres relay at the 1996 Summer Olympics.
