= 1997 African Junior Athletics Championships =

3rd African Junior Championships
- Dates: 21 – 23 August
- Host city: Ibadan, Nigeria
- Level: Under-20
- Events: 43

The 1997 African Junior Athletics Championships was the third edition of the biennial, continental athletics tournament for African athletes aged 19 years or younger. It was held in Ibadan, Nigeria, from 21–23 August. A total of 43 events were contested, 22 by men and 21 by women.

Agnes Afiyo of Ghana, the winner of the women's javelin throw and the 200 metres bronze medallist, was determined to be male in 1999 following medical testing. It is not known whether the medals from this competition were reassigned as a result.

== Medal table ==
* Host nation (Nigeria)

Rank	NOC	Gold	Silver	Bronze	Total
1	Nigeria (NGR)	13	11	15	39
2	Algeria (ALG)	7	6	5	18
3	Kenya (KEN)	7	4	1	12
4	South Africa (RSA)	7	2	5	14
5	Ghana (GHA)	5	8	5	18
6	Ethiopia (ETH)	3	3	3	9
7	Egypt (EGY)	1	5	2	8
8	Togo (TOG)	0	1	1	2
8	Uganda (UGA)	0	1	1	2
10	Gabon (GAB)	0	1	0	1
11	Tunisia (TUN)	0	0	2	2
12	Botswana (BOT)	0	0	1	1
12	Zimbabwe (ZIM)	0	0	1	1
Totals (13 entries)		43	42	42	127

== Medal summary ==
=== Men ===
Event	Gold		Silver		Bronze	
100 metres	Sunday Emmanuel (NGR)	10.55	Abu Duah (GHA)	10.78	Tanko Braimah (GHA)	10.94
200 metres	Sunday Emmanuel (NGR)	21.12	Tanko Braimah (GHA)	21.17	Musa Deji (NGR)	21.54
400 metres	Fidelis Gadzama (NGR)	46.38	Musa Audu (NGR)	47.02	Daniel Adomako (GHA)	47.42
800 metres	Benjamin Kipkurui (KEN)	1:49.66	Mostafa Shalaby (EGY)	1:49.82	Lucky Hadebe (RSA)	1:49.86
1500 metres	Benjamin Kipkurui (KEN)	3:44.17	Mengesha Feyesa (ETH)	3:46.56	Seth Bortey (GHA)	3:46.62
5000 metres	Reuben Kamzee (KEN)	13:56.60	Dagne Alemu (ETH)	14:04.42	Yibeltal Admassu (ETH)	14:20.63
10,000 metres	Reuben Kamzee (KEN)	30:02.60	Jafred Lorone (UGA)	30:07.00	Tadele Dereje (ETH)	30:14.08
110 metres hurdles	Frank Bonsu (GHA)	14.7	Nader Hosni (EGY)	15.3	Lekan Soetan (NGR)	15.7
400 metres hurdles	Essel Mensah (GHA)	51.58	Ismail Hashem Ismail (EGY)	51.80	Glory Okpako (NGR)	52.71
3000 metres steeplechase	Reuben Kosgei (KEN)	8:40.40	Abraham Cherono (KEN)	8:44.28	Maru Daba (ETH)	8:47.46
4×100 m relay	Nigeria (NGR)		Ghana (GHA)		Algeria (ALG)	
4×400 m relay	Nigeria (NGR)	3:08.68	Ghana (GHA)	3:09.52	Algeria (ALG)	3:14.86
10,000 metres walk	Rezki Yahi (ALG)	50:48.14	Reda Amira (ALG)	51:18.56	Adebayo Bada (NGR)	54:38.88
High jump	Vusumzi Mtshatseni (RSA)	2.10 m	Justice Ezueakara (NGR)	2.05 m	Monday Osagie (NGR)	2.00 m
Pole vault	Johann Venter (RSA)	4.70 m	Mohamed Benyahia (ALG)	4.70 m	Béchir Zaghouani (TUN)	4.50 m
Long jump	Mark Anthony Awere (GHA)	7.39 m	Tadjou Talon (TOG)	6.90 m	Raphael Akpata (NGR)	6.89 m
Triple jump	Mark Anthony Awere (GHA)	15.29 m	Yvon Ngoua (GAB)	14.62 m	Allegton Uwasanyem (NGR)	14.60 m
Shot put	Janus Robberts (RSA)	18.55 m	Monday Ibrahim (NGR)	16.50 m	Okechukwu Eziuka (NGR)	16.00 m
Discus throw	Janus Robberts (RSA)	54.55 m	Godwin Imoisi (NGR)	46.12 m	Walid Boudaoui (ALG)	45.95 m
Hammer throw	Yamine Hussein (EGY)	63.46 m	Nabil Amroune (ALG)	57.94 m	John Osazuwa (NGR)	55.94 m
Javelin throw	Nnamdi Uche (NGR)	60.04 m	Félix Kouadio (CIV)	59.32 m	Kossivi Kponor (TOG)	46.20 m
Decathlon	Mohamed Benyahia (ALG)	7086 pts	Mohamed Mounib (ALG)	6737 pts	Lee Okoroafor (NGR)	6505 pts

=== Women ===
Event	Gold		Silver		Bronze	
100 metres	Funmilola Ogundana (NGR)	12.03	Monica Twum (GHA)	12.42	Justine Bayiga (UGA)	12.86
200 metres	Funmilola Ogundana (NGR)	23.92	Monica Twum (GHA)	24.28	Agnes Afiyo (GHA)	24.32
400 metres	Doris Jacob (NGR)	52.88	Rosemary Okafor (NGR)	53.49	Monica Twum (GHA)	54.35
800 metres	Nancy Langat (KEN)	2:05.7	Naomi Misoi (KEN)	2:07.4	Ramomene Boikhutso (BOT)	2:09.0
1500 metres	Rose Kosgei (KEN)	4:14.56	Etaferahu Tarekegn (ETH)	4:14.65	René Kalmer (RSA)	4:16.90
3000 metres	Etaferahu Tarekegn (ETH)	9:10.45	Jacqueline Okemwa (KEN)	9:19.26	René Kalmer (RSA)	9:20.51
10,000 metres	Merima Hashim (ETH)	34:48.68	Jacqueline Okemwa (KEN)	35:09.69	Margaret Chepkemboi (KEN)	35:42.60
100 metres hurdles	Baya Rahouli (ALG)	13.87	Funmilola Ogundana (NGR)	14.47	Laraba Nasiru (NGR)	14.49
400 metres hurdles	Elizabeth Ndubueze (NGR)	58.70	Esther Erharuyi (NGR)	58.81	Yvonne Ntini (ZIM)	59.88
4×100 m relay	Nigeria (NGR)	45.73	Ghana (GHA)	45.77	Algeria (ALG)	47.99
4×400 m relay	Nigeria (NGR)	3:37.99	Ghana (GHA)	3:44.00	Algeria (ALG)	3:52.91
5000 metres walk	Gete Koma (ETH)	27:17.73	Faiza Azzouzi (ALG)	27:50.56	Hiba Ahmed (EGY)	30:19.66
High jump	Hestrie Storbeck (RSA)	1.90 m	Gloria Nwosu (NGR)	1.70 m	Olubunmi Titcomb (NGR)	1.70 m
Pole vault	Sonia Smili (ALG)	2.00 m	Only one athlete cleared a height			
Long jump	Grace Umelo (NGR)	6.25 m	Baya Rahouli (ALG)	6.12 m	Charlene Lawrence (RSA)	5.81 m
Triple jump	Baya Rahouli (ALG)	13.39 m	Edith Wilcox (NGR)	12.76 m	Grace Efago (NGR)	12.69 m
Shot put	Veronica Abrahamse (RSA)	15.80 m	Maranelle Du Toit (RSA)	15.70 m	Amira Naji (EGY)	13.28 m
Discus throw	Elizna Naudé (RSA)	46.16 m	Maranelle Du Toit (RSA)	44.20 m	Nesrine Dahman (TUN)	40.55 m
Hammer throw	Djida Yalloulène (ALG)	44.10 m	Wala Khalil (EGY)	37.20 m	Yinka Owosile (NGR)	34.80 m
Javelin throw	Agnes Afiyo (GHA)	53.54 m	Sorochukwu Ihuefo (NGR)	48.66 m	Veronica Abrahamse (RSA)	47.52 m
Heptathlon	Naïma Bentahar (ALG)	4123 pts	Hani Jamil (EGY)	3681 pts	Azeez Morili (NGR)	3370 pts
