= 2008 African Championships in Athletics – Women's shot put =

The women's shot put event at the 2008 African Championships in Athletics was held at the Addis Ababa Stadium on May 1.

== Results ==
Rank	Athlete	Nationality	#1	#2	#3	#4	#5	#6	Result	Notes
1st place, gold medalist(s)	Vivian Chukwuemeka	Nigeria	17.22	x	17.32	17.00	17.50	x	17.50	
2nd place, silver medalist(s)	Kasey Onmuchekwa	Nigeria	15.64	16.29	x	16.00	16.22	x	16.29	
3rd place, bronze medalist(s)	Veronica Abrahamse	South Africa	13.10	15.27	15.06	15.49	16.00	x	16.00	
4	Amal Abdel Sabour Salem	Egypt	14.56	15.34	x	x	14.41	x	15.34	
5	Simoné du Toit	South Africa	15.20	x	15.33	x	14.89	x	15.33	
6	Monique Ngo Ngoué	Cameroon	13.25	x	14.09	14.85	15.28	14.44	15.28	NR
7	Walao Attia	Egypt	13.42	x	13.98	x	x	14.11	14.11	
8	Alifatou Djibril	Togo	11.49	13.04	13.48	x	13.19	–	13.48	
9	Nakani Coulibaly	Mali	13.19	12.34	12.72				13.19	
10	Selamawit Hailu	Ethiopia	11.23	11.34	11.55				11.55	
11	Roman Abera	Ethiopia	10.50	10.56	11.05				11.05	
12	Zewodinesh Beshah	Ethiopia	10.29	10.64	10.59				10.64	
