= Wafaa Ismail Baghdadi =

Egyptian shot putter

Medal record

Women's athletics

Representing Egypt

African Championships
Gold medal – first place	2004 Brazzaville	Shot put
Silver medal – second place	1996 Yaoundé	Shot put
Silver medal – second place	2006 Bambous	Shot put
Bronze medal – third place	2000 Algiers	Shot put
Bronze medal – third place	2002 Radès	Shot put

Wafaa Ismail Baghdadi (born 1 October 1969) is an Egyptian athlete specializing in the shot put. In November 2007 she was found guilty of taking prohibited substance Methandienone and disqualified for 2 years.

== Achievements ==
Year	Competition	Venue	Position	Notes
1996	African Championships	Yaoundé, Cameroon	2nd	
2000	African Championships	Algiers, Algeria	2nd	
2002	African Championships	Radès, Tunisia	3rd	
2004	African Championships	Brazzaville, Congo	1st	
2006	African Championships	Bambous, Mauritius	2nd	

== Doping ==
In November 2007 she was found guilty of taking prohibited substance Methandienone and disqualified for 2 years.

== See also ==
- Egyptian athletes
- List of champions of Africa of athletics
- List of doping cases in athletics
