= Bois-d'Arcy =

Bois-d'Arcy is the name of the following communes in France:

- Bois-d'Arcy, Yonne, in the Yonne department
- Bois-d'Arcy, Yvelines, in the Yvelines department
