= Oksana Chibisova =

Russian shot putter

Oksana Chibisova (born 31 March 1977) is a Russian shot putter.

She competed at the 2005 World Championships without reaching the final round.

Her personal best throw is 18.62 metres, achieved in July 2005 in Tula.
