= Fodé Sissoko =

Malian sprinter (born 1996)

Personal information
- Born: 9 October 1996 (age 29)

Sport
- Country: Mali
- Sport: Athletics
- Events: 200 metres, 400 metres

Fodé Sissoko (born 9 October 1996) is a Malian sprinter competing primarily in the 200 metres. He competed in the 200 metres at the 2020 Summer Olympics. He also competed in the same event at the 2019 World Athletics Championships.

He currently resides in Lille, France. In an interview, he explained his reasoning behind the move. He said the political conditions in Mali weren't conducive to him reaching the top level, thus moving to France would allow him to reach a new level. However, he continues to compete on behalf of Mali while living outside his homeland.

== Personal bests ==
Outdoor

- 100 metres – 10.48 (Montgeron 2020)
- 200 metres – 20.52 (Kortrijk 2018) NR
- 400 metres – 46.28 (Brussels 2018)

Indoor

- 60 metres – 6.80 (Liévin 2019)
- 200 metres – 20.88 (Miramas 2021) NR
- 300 metres – 33.15 (Ghent 2019)
- 400 metres – 47.54 (Liévin 2019) NR
