= Oumou Traoré =

Malian athlete (born 1969)

Personal information
- Nationality: Malian
- Born: 10 October 1969 (age 56)
- Height: 1.83 m (6 ft 0 in)

Sport
- Event: Discus throw
Medal record
Women's athletics
Representing Mali
African Championships
Bronze medal – third place	1996 Yaoundé	Shot put

Oumou Traoré (born 10 October 1969) is a Malian athlete who competed in the discus throw and shot put.

In the discus throw, Traoré finished tenth at the 2001 Jeux de la Francophonie, eighth at the 2003 All-Africa Games was held on October 12. and fourth at the 2004 African Championships. She competed at the 1995 World Championships and the 1996 Summer Olympics without reaching the final.

Her personal best throw is 47.67 metres, achieved in 2000. This is the Malian record.

In the shot put, she won the bronze medal at the 1996 African Championships and the gold medal at the 1999 West African Championships.
