= Olusegun =

Olúṣẹ́gun
- Gender: Male
- Language: Yoruba

Origin
- Meaning: God is victorious
- Region of origin: Nigeria; Benin

Other names
- Variant forms: Olúwaṣẹ́gun; Sẹ́gun

Olusegun (sometimes spelled as Oluwasegun or its diminutive form, Segun) is a name of Yoruba origin for males, meaning "God is victorious".

Notable people with the name include:

- Akinsola Olusegun Faluyi (born 1934), Nigerian engineer
- Olusegun Obasanjo (born 1937), Nigerian military personnel and politician
- Olufela Olusegun Oludotun Ransome-Kuti (1938–1997), better known as Fela Kuti, Nigerian musician and human rights activist
- Olusegun Osoba (born 1939) Nigerian journalist and politician
- Olusegun Olumodeji (born 1945), Nigerian footballer
- Harold Olusegun Demuren (born 1945), Nigerian engineer
- Leo Segun Ajiborisha, Nigerian military general
- Olusegun Adewoye (1947–2015), Nigerian engineer and academic
- Olusegun Agagu (1948–2013), Nigerian politician
- Patrick Olusegun Odegbami (born 1952), Nigerian footballer
- Olusegun Oni (born 1954), Nigerian politician
- Olusegun Mimiko (born 1954), Nigerian politician
- Olufemi Olusegun Pedro (born 1955), Nigerian politician
- Olusegun Olutoyin Aganga (born 1955), Nigerian politician
- Henry Olusegun Adeola Samuel, (born, 1963), British singer
- Olusegun Awolowo, (born 1963), Nigerian Lawyer
- Olusegun Arinze, (born, 1965), Nigerian actor
- Babatunde Oluwasegun Oshinowo, (born 1983), American football player
- Oluwasegun Abiodun, (born 1984), Nigerian footballer
- Oluwasegun Makinde, (born 1991), Nigerian-Canadian athlete
- Olusegun Oluwatimi (born 1999), American football player

For people not in the list, see:
