= Monia Kari =

Tunisian discus thrower

Medal record

Women's athletics

Representing Tunisia

African Championships
Gold medal – first place	1996 Yaoundé	Discus throw
Gold medal – first place	2000 Algiers	Discus throw
Gold medal – first place	2002 Radès	Discus throw

Monia Kari (born 14 April 1971 in Basel, Basel-Stadt) is a Tunisian discus thrower.

Her personal best throw is 61.74 metres, achieved in May 1996 in Tunis. This is the current African record.

== Achievements ==
Year	Competition	Venue	Position	Event	Notes
Representing Tunisia
1993	Mediterranean Games	Narbonne, France	3rd	Discus throw	55.38 m
1993	World Championships	Stuttgart, Germany	21st (q)	Discus throw	51.26 m
1994	Jeux de la Francophonie	Bondoufle, France	5th	Discus throw	53.58 m
1995	All-Africa Games	Harare, Zimbabwe	1st	Discus throw	54.26 m (CR)
1996	African Championships	Yaoundé, Cameroon	1st	Discus throw	53.00 m
1996	Olympic Games	Atlanta, United States	28th (q)	Discus throw	58.02 m
1997	Mediterranean Games	Bari, Italy	5th	Discus throw	59.10 m
1999	All-Africa Games	Johannesburg, South Africa	1st	Discus throw	57.22 m (CR)
2000	African Championships	Algiers, Algeria	1st	Discus throw	58.46 m (CR)
2000	Olympic Games	Sydney, Australia	23rd (q)	Discus throw	56.32 m
2001	Jeux de la Francophonie	Ottawa, Canada	4th	Discus throw	51.71 m
2001	Mediterranean Games	Radès, Tunisia	3rd	Discus throw	56.44 m
2002	African Championships	Dakar, Senegal	1st	Discus throw	55.28 m
2002	World Cup	Madrid, Spain	7th	Discus throw	56.16 m
2004	Pan Arab Games	Algiers, Algeria	1st	Discus throw	54.68 m
2007	All-Africa Games	Algiers, Algeria	2nd	Discus throw	55.15 m
2007	Pan Arab Games	Cairo, Egypt	3rd	Shot put	12.58 m
2007	Pan Arab Games	Cairo, Egypt	1st	Discus throw	52.79 m
2009	Mediterranean Games	Pescara, Italy	6th	Discus throw	53.60 m
