= African U20 Athletics Championships =

Athletics continental championship competition for athletes under 20 years old

African Athletics U20 Championships
- Status: active
- Genre: sports event
- Date: midyear
- Frequency: biennial
- Inaugurated: 1994
- Organiser: Confederation of African Athletics

The African Athletics U20 Championships, known formally as African Junior Athletics Championships is a biennial continental athletics event for junior athletes from African nations. Organized by the Confederation of African Athletics and first held in 1994, only athletes aged 19 or under are allowed to compete.

== Editions ==
Edition	Year	City	Country	Date	Venue	No. of Events	No. of Athletes	Leading nation
I	1994	Algiers	Algeria	6–8 July	Stade du 5 Juillet	40		South Africa
II	1995	Bouaké	Ivory Coast	20–22 July	Stade de la Paix	36		Nigeria
III	1997	Ibadan	Nigeria	21–23 August	Liberty Stadium	43		Nigeria
IV	1999	Tunis	Tunisia	22–25 July	El Menzah Stadium	43		Tunisia
V	2001	Réduit (Moka)	Mauritius	9–12 July	Maryse Justin Stadium	41		South Africa
VI	2003	Garoua	Cameroon	31 July – 3 August	Roumdé Adjia Stadium	44		Egypt
VII	2005	Radès (Tunis)	Tunisia	1–4 September	7 November Stadium	44		South Africa
VIII	2007	Ouagadougou	Burkina Faso	9–12 August	Stade du 4 Août	44		Kenya
IX	2009	Bambous	Mauritius	30 July – 2 August	Stade Germain Comarmond	41		South Africa
X	2011	Gaborone	Botswana	12–15 May	University of Botswana Stadium	44		South Africa
XI	2013	Bambous	Mauritius	29 August – 1 September	Stade Germain Comarmond	40	223	Nigeria
XII	2015	Addis Ababa	Ethiopia	5–8 March	Addis Ababa Stadium	43		Nigeria
XIII	2017	Tlemcen	Algeria	29 June – 2 July	Lalla-Setti Stadium	41		Ethiopia
XIV	2019	Abidjan	Ivory Coast	16–20 April	Stade Félix Houphouët-Boigny	42		South Africa
XV	2023	Ndola	Zambia	29 April – 3 May	Levy Mwanawasa Stadium	45		South Africa
XVI	2025	Abeokuta	Nigeria	16–20 July	MKO Abiola Sports Complex	45		South Africa
XVII	2027		Algeria			45		

== Championship records ==
=== Men ===
Event	Record	Athlete	Nationality	Date	Meet	City	Ref.
100 m	10.29 (+0.5 m/s)	Enoch Olaoluwa Adegoke	Nigeria	17 April 2019	2019 Championships	Abidjan, Ivory Coast	
200 m	20.22 (+1.1 m/s)	Clarence Munyai	South Africa	2 July 2017	2017 Championships	Tlemcen, Algeria	
400 m	44.91 A	Busang Kebinatshipi	Botswana	29 April 2023	2023 Championships	Ndola, Zambia	
800 m	1:45.25	Ngeno Kipngetich	Kenya	20 April 2019	2019 Championships	Abidjan, Ivory Coast	
1500 m	3:35.43	Hillary Maiyo	Kenya	May 2011	2011 Championships	Gaborone, Botswana	
5000 m	13:13.06	Edward Zakayo	Kenya	19 April 2019	2019 Championships	Abidjan, Ivory Coast	
10,000 m	27:55.74	Geoffrey Kirui	Kenya	May 2011	2011 Championships	Gaborone, Botswana	
110 m hurdles (0.99 m)	13.61 (+1.8 m/s)	Atuma Ifeanyichukwu	Nigeria	March 2015	2015 Championships	Addis Ababa, Ethiopia	
400 m hurdles	50.05	Cornel Fredericks	South Africa	August 2009	2009 Championships	Bambous, Mauritius	
3000 m steeplechase	8:19.84	Raymond Yator	Kenya	July 1999	1999 Championships	Tunis, Tunisia	
High jump	2.18 m	Breyton Poole	South Africa	18 April 2019	2019 Championships	Abidjan, Ivory Coast	
Pole vault	5.30 m	Cheyne Rahme	South Africa	August 2009	2009 Championships	Bambous, Mauritius	
Long jump	7.79 m	Keenan Watson	South Africa	August 2007	2007 Championships	Ouagadougou, Burkina Faso	
Triple jump	16.30 m (±0.0 m/s)	Chengetayi Mapaya	Zimbabwe	1 July 2017	2017 Championships	Tlemcen, Algeria	
Shot put (6 kg)	20.66 m	Mohamed Magdi Hamza	Egypt	6 March 2015	2015 Championships	Addis Ababa, Ethiopia	
Discus throw (1.75 kg)	61.87 m	Omar El-Ghazaly	Egypt	August 2003	2003 Championships	Garoua, Cameroon	
Hammer throw (6 kg)	75.59 m	Alaa Elaslry	Egypt	August 2009	2009 Championships	Bambous, Mauritius	
Javelin throw	77.45 m	Willie Human	South Africa	July 2001	2001 Championships	Réduit, Mauritius	
Decathlon	7086 pts	Mohamed Benyahia	Algeria	August 1997	1997 Championships	Ibadan, Nigeria	
Decathlon	100m (wind) / Long jump (wind) / Shot put / High jump / 400m / 110m H (wind) / Discus / Pole vault / Javelin / 1500m						
10,000 m walk (track)	44:43.47	Yonanis Algaw Wale	Ethiopia	30 June 2017	2017 Championships	Tlemcen, Algeria	
10,000 m walk (track)	44:43.47	Bahaeddine Gatri	Tunisia	30 June 2017	2017 Championships	Tlemcen, Algeria	
4 × 100 m relay	39.51	Yves Sonan; Ahmed Douhou; Ade Bayo; Ibrahim Meité	Ivory Coast	July 1995	1995 Championships	Bouaké, Ivory Coast	
4 × 400 m relay	3:07.54	Tshepo Kelaotswe; Bakang Molefe; Oganne Keogotsitse; Justice Oratile	Botswana	20 July 2025	2025 Championships	Abeokuta, Nigeria	

=== Women ===
Event	Record	Athlete	Nationality	Date	Meet	City	Ref.
100 m	11.38 (−1.0 m/s)	Mercy Nku	Nigeria	July 1995	1995 Championships	Bouaké, Ivory Coast	
200 m	23.40 (+1.1 m/s)	Delphine Atangana	Cameroon	August 2003	2003 Championships	Garoua, Cameroon	
400 m	52.02	Folashade Abugan	Nigeria	August 2009	2009 Championships	Bambous, Mauritius	
800 m	1:56.72	Caster Semenya	South Africa	August 2009	2009 Championships	Bambous, Mauritius	
1500 m	4:08.01	Caster Semenya	South Africa	August 2009	2009 Championships	Bambous, Mauritius	
3000 m	8:53.40	Sally Barsosio	Kenya	July 1994	1994 Championships	Algiers, Algeria	
5000 m	15:24.66	Caroline Chepkoech	Kenya	May 2011	2011 Championships	Gaborone, Botswana	
10,000 m	33:49.10	Birhan Dagne	Ethiopia	July 1994	1994 Championships	Algiers, Algeria	
100 m hurdles	13.59 (+1.7 m/s)	Gnima Faye	Senegal	August 2003	2003 Championships	Garoua, Cameroon	
400 m hurdles	57.37	Rogail Joseph	South Africa	20 April 2019	2019 Championships	Abidjan, Ivory Coast	
3000 m steeplechase	9:48.56	Fancy Cherono	Kenya	18 April 2019	2019 Championships	Abidjan, Ivory Coast	
High jump	1.90 m	Hestrie Storbeck	South Africa	August 1997	1997 Championships	Ibadan, Nigeria	
Pole vault	3.65 m	Sirine Balti	Tunisia	July 1999	1999 Championships	Tunis, Tunisia	
Long jump	6.33 m (−0.7 m/s)	Ese Brume	Nigeria	8 March 2015	2015 Championships	Addis Ababa, Ethiopia	
Triple jump	13.39 m	Baya Rahouli	Algeria	August 1997	1997 Championships	Ibadan, Nigeria	
Shot put	16.93 m	Marli Knoetze	South Africa	September 2005	2005 Championships	Tunis and Radès, Tunisia	
Discus throw	49.90 m	Ischke Senekal	South Africa	May 2011	2011 Championships	Gaborone, Botswana	
Hammer throw	60.63 m	Rawan Aymen Barakat	Egypt	20 April 2019	2019 Championships	Abidjan, Ivory Coast	
Javelin throw	54.55 m	Tazmin Brits	South Africa	August 2009	2009 Championships	Bambous, Mauritius	
Heptathlon	5366 Pts	Margaret Simpson	Ghana	July 1999	1999 Championships	Tunis, Tunisia	
Heptathlon	100m H (wind) / High jump / Shot put / 200m (wind) / Long jump (wind) / Javelin / 800m						
10,000 m walk (track)	52:14.73	Ayalnesh Dejene Nigatu	Ethiopia	2 July 2017	2017 Championships	Tlemcen, Algeria	
4 × 100 m relay	44.83	Aniekeme Alphonsus; Omotayo Abolaji; Blessing Adiakerehawa; Ese Brume	Nigeria	7 March 2015	2015 Championships	Addis Ababa, Ethiopia	
4 × 400 m relay	3:37.99		Nigeria	August 1997	1997 Championships	Ibadan, Nigeria	

== All time Medal table ==
As of 2017

Rank	Nation	Gold	Silver	Bronze	Total
1	South Africa (RSA)	110	66	53	229
2	Kenya (KEN)	80	76	33	189
3	Nigeria (NGR)	75	68	38	181
4	Ethiopia (ETH)	48	63	64	175
5	Egypt (EGY)	47	44	29	120
6	Algeria (ALG)	41	38	53	132
7	Morocco (MAR)	27	34	47	108
8	Tunisia (TUN)	23	24	46	93
9	Ghana (GHA)	11	21	20	52
10	Mauritius (MUS)	11	19	26	56
11	Senegal (SEN)	10	12	14	36
12	Sudan (SUD)	10	6	4	20
13	Uganda (UGA)	8	4	9	21
14	Zimbabwe (ZIM)	7	10	6	23
15	Burkina Faso (BUR)	5	13	15	33
16	Botswana (BOT)	5	9	19	33
17	Cameroon (CMR)	5	8	7	20
18	Ivory Coast (CIV)	5	5	12	22
19	Seychelles (SEY)	4	5	7	16
20	Gambia (GAM)	3	2	2	7
21	Namibia (NAM)	2	4	6	12
22	Mali (MLI)	2	1	3	6
23	Madagascar (MAD)	2	0	2	4
24	Libya (LBY)	1	3	0	4
25	Lesotho (LES)	1	1	1	3
25	Togo (TOG)	1	1	1	3
27	Burundi (BDI)	1	0	1	2
28	Comoros (COM)	1	0	0	1
29	Gabon (GAB)	0	3	1	4
30	Benin (BEN)	0	2	0	2
31	Zambia (ZAM)	0	1	1	2
32	DR Congo (COD)	0	1	0	1
32	Mozambique (MOZ)	0	1	0	1
34	Eritrea (ERI)	0	0	4	4
35	Congo (CGO)	0	0	1	1
35	Rwanda (RWA)	0	0	1	1
Totals (36 entries)		546	545	526	1,617
