= Vivian Chukwuemeka =

Nigerian shot putter (born 1975)

Medal record

Women's athletics

Representing Nigeria

African Championships
| Gold medal – first place | 2002 Radès | Shot put |
| Gold medal – first place | 2006 Bambous | Shot put |
| Gold medal – first place | 2008 Addis Ababa | Shot put |
| Silver medal – second place | 2002 Radès | Discus throw |
| Silver medal – second place | 2006 Bambous | Discus throw |

Vivian Peters-Chukwuemeka (born 4 May 1975) is a Nigerian retired shot putter and two-time Olympian. She won the gold medal in the shot put at the 2002 Commonwealth Games and has won three consecutive titles at the All-Africa Games from 1999 to 2007. She was the African Champion in the event in 2002, 2006 and 2008. She also competes in discus throw and hammer throw, but not on world level.

Her personal best throw is 18.43 metres, achieved in April 2003 in Walnut. This is the African record.

She competed at the 2000 Summer Olympics and the World Championships in 2003 and 2005 without reaching the finals. She won a silver medal at the 2006 Commonwealth Games.

She graduated from Azusa Pacific University in 2006 with a Bachelor of Social Work.

She received a two-year ban from athletics for a failed drug test at the 2009 Nigerian Championships. Chukwuemeka submitted that the investigation process was inadequately handled, but her claims were dismissed by the appeals panel and her two-year ban from the IAAF remained. When Chukwuemeka returned to competition in 2012, she failed a second drugs test – for the anabolic steroid stanozolol – shortly before the Olympic Games. Subsequently, she was given a lifetime ban from competition.

== Achievements ==
| Year | Competition | Venue | Position | Event | Notes |
Representing Nigeria
| 2000 | Olympic Games | Sydney, Australia | 14th | Shot put | 17.47 m |
| 2002 | Commonwealth Games | Manchester, United Kingdom | 1st | Shot put | 17.53 m |
| 2002 | Commonwealth Games | Manchester, United Kingdom | 9th | Discus throw | 53.44 m |
| 2002 | African Championships | Radès, Tunisia | 1st | Shot put | |
| 2002 | African Championships | Radès, Tunisia | 2nd | Discus throw | |
| 2002 | World Cup | Madrid, Spain | 7th | Shot put | |
| 2003 | All-Africa Games | Abuja, Nigeria | 1st | Shot put | |
| 2003 | All-Africa Games | Abuja, Nigeria | 2nd | Discus throw | |
| 2003 | All-Africa Games | Abuja, Nigeria | 3rd | Hammer throw | |
| 2006 | Commonwealth Games | Melbourne, Australia | 2nd | Shot put | |
| 2006 | Commonwealth Games | Melbourne, Australia | 9th | Discus throw | |
| 2006 | African Championships | Bambous, Mauritius | 1st | Shot put | |
| 2006 | African Championships | Bambous, Mauritius | 2nd | Discus throw | |
| 2006 | World Cup | Athens, Greece | 8th | Shot put | |
| 2007 | All-Africa Games | Algiers, Algeria | 1st | Shot put | 17.60 m |
| 2007 | All-Africa Games | Algiers, Algeria | 3rd | Discus throw | 52.52 m |
| 2007 | All-Africa Games | Algiers, Algeria | 4th | Hammer throw | 58.15 m |
| 2008 | African Championships | Addis Ababa, Ethiopia | 1st | Shot put | 17.50 m |
| 2008 | Olympic Games | Beijing, China | 24th (q) | Shot put | 17.15 m |
