= 1986 in the sport of athletics =

1986 in athletics
- Major world events: World Championships; World Indoor Championships

This article contains an overview of the year 1986 in the sport of athletics.

== International Events ==
- Asian Games
- Balkan Games
- European Championships
- European Indoor Championships
- Commonwealth Games
- Goodwill Games
- World Junior Championships

== World records ==
=== Men ===
EVENT	ATHLETE	MARK	DATE	VENUE
Pole vault	Sergei Bubka (URS)	6.01m	July 8	Moscow
Shot put	Udo Beyer (GDR)	22.64m	August 20	East Berlin, East Germany
Discus throw	Jürgen Schult (GDR)	74.08m	June 6	Neubrandenburg, East Germany
Hammer throw	Yuriy Syedikh (URS)	86.66m	June 22	Tallinn, Soviet Union
Hammer throw	Yuriy Syedikh (URS)	86.74m	August 30	Stuttgart, West Germany
Javelin (new)	Tom Petranoff (USA)	85.38m	July 7	Helsinki, Finland
Javelin (new)	Klaus Tafelmeier (FRG)	85.74m	September 21	Como, Italy

=== Women ===
EVENT	ATHLETE	MARK	DATE	VENUE
2,000 metres	Maricica Puica (ROM)	5:28.69	July 11	London
5,000 metres	Ingrid Kristiansen (NOR)	14:37.33	August 5	Stockholm, Sweden
10,000 metres	Ingrid Kristiansen (NOR)	30:13.74	July 5	Oslo, Norway
100m Hurdles	Yordanka Donkova (BUL)	12.35	August 17	Köln, West Germany
100m Hurdles	Yordanka Donkova (BUL)	12.29	August 17	Köln, West Germany
100m Hurdles	Yordanka Donkova (BUL)	12.26	September 7	Ljubljana, Yugoslavia
400m Hurdles	Marina Styepanova (URS)	53.32	August 30	Stuttgart, West Germany
400m Hurdles	Marina Styepanova (URS)	52.94	September 17	Tashkent, Soviet Union
High jump	Stefka Kostadinova (BUL)	2.08m	June 1	Sofia, Bulgaria
Long jump	Heike Drechsler (GDR)	7.45m	June 21	Tallinn, Estonia
Javelin throw	Fatima Whitbread (GBR)	77.44m	August 28	Stuttgart, West Germany
Heptathlon	Jackie Joyner-Kersee (USA)	7148	July 6–7	Moscow, Soviet Union
Heptathlon	Jackie Joyner-Kersee (USA)	7158	August 1–2	Houston, United States

- Heike Drechsler (GDR) twice equals the world record in the women's 200 metres held by countrywoman Marita Koch since 1979-06-10, clocking 21.71 seconds on 1986-06-29 and 1986-08-29.

== Men's Best Year Performers ==
=== 100 metres ===
RANK	1986 WORLD BEST PERFORMERS	TIME
1.	Chidi Imoh (NGR)	10.00
2.	Robson da Silva (BRA)	10.02
3.	Linford Christie (GBR)	10.04
4.	Carl Lewis (USA)	10.06
5.	Emmit King (USA)	10.07

=== 200 metres ===
RANK	1986 WORLD BEST PERFORMERS	TIME
1.	Floyd Heard (USA)	20.12
2.	Roy Martin (USA)	20.16
3.	Lorenzo Daniel (USA)	20.17
4.	John Dinan (AUS)	20.19
5.	Michael Timpson (USA)	20.23

=== 400 metres ===
RANK	1986 WORLD BEST PERFORMERS	TIME
1.	Gabriel Tiacoh (CIV)	44.30
2.	Darrell Robinson (USA)	44.45
3.	Roddie Haley (USA)	44.48
4.	Innocent Egbunike (NGR)	44.50
5.	Roger Black (GBR)	44.59

=== 800 metres ===
RANK	1986 WORLD BEST PERFORMERS	TIME
1.	Steve Cram (GBR)	1:43.19
2.	Johnny Gray (USA)	1:43.46
—	William Wuycke (VEN)	1:43.54
4.	Earl Jones (USA)	1:43.62
5.	Peter Braun (GDR)	1:44.03

=== 1,500 metres ===
RANK	1986 WORLD BEST PERFORMERS	TIME
1.	Sebastian Coe (GBR)	3:29.77
2.	Steve Cram (GBR)	3:30.15
3.	José Manuel Abascal (ESP)	3:31.13
4.	Sydney Maree (USA)	3:32.56
5.	José Luis González (ESP)	3:32.90

=== Mile ===
RANK	1986 WORLD BEST PERFORMERS	TIME
1.	Steve Cram (GBR)	3:48.31
2.	Steve Scott (USA)	3:48.73
3.	Jim Spivey (USA)	3:49.80
4.	Saïd Aouita (MAR)	3:50.33
5.	José Manuel Abascal (ESP)	3:50.54

=== 3,000 metres ===
RANK	1986 WORLD BEST PERFORMERS	TIME
1.	Saïd Aouita (MAR)	7:32.23
2.	Sydney Maree (USA)	7:38.26
3.	Paul Kipkoech (KEN)	7:39.38
4.	Jack Buckner (GBR)	7:40.23
5.	Vincent Rousseau (BEL)	7:42.15

=== 5,000 metres ===
RANK	1986 WORLD BEST PERFORMERS	TIME
1.	Saïd Aouita (MAR)	13:00.86
2.	Jack Buckner (GBR)	13:10.15
3.	Stefano Mei (ITA)	13:11.57
4.	Tim Hutchings (GBR)	13:12.88
5.	Evgeni Ignatov (BUL)	13:13.15

=== 10,000 metres ===
RANK	1986 WORLD BEST PERFORMERS	TIME
1.	Mark Nenow (USA)	27:20.56
2.	Saïd Aouita (MAR)	27:26.11
3.	Hansjörg Kunze (GDR)	27:34.68
4.	Salvatore Antibo (ITA)	27:39.52
5.	Paul Kipkoech (KEN)	27:43.31

=== Half Marathon ===
RANK	1986 WORLD BEST PERFORMERS	TIME
1.	Michael Musyoki (KEN)	1:00:43

=== 110m Hurdles ===
RANK	1986 WORLD BEST PERFORMERS	TIME
1.	Stéphane Caristan (FRA)	13.20
2.	Greg Foster (USA)	13.25
3.	Andrey Prokofyev (URS)	13.28
4.	Keith Talley (USA)	13.31
5.	Mark McKoy (CAN)	13.35

=== 400m Hurdles ===
RANK	1986 WORLD BEST PERFORMERS	TIME
1.	Edwin Moses (USA)	47.38
2.	Andre Phillips (USA)	47.51
3.	Danny Harris (USA)	47.82
4.	Harald Schmid (FRG)	47.89
5.	Amadou Dia Bâ (SEN)	48.07

=== 3,000m Steeplechase ===
RANK	1986 WORLD BEST PERFORMERS	TIME
1.	William Van Dijck (BEL)	8:10.01
2.	Colin Reitz (GBR)	8:12.11
3.	Julius Korir (KEN)	8:12.74
4.	Henry Marsh (USA)	8:13.15
5.	Peter Koech (KEN)	8:13.33

=== High jump ===
RANK	1986 WORLD BEST PERFORMERS	HEIGHT
1.	Igor Paklin (URS)	2.38
2.	Jim Howard (USA)	2.36
—	Carlo Thränhardt (FRG)	2.36
—	Javier Sotomayor (CUB)	2.36
5.	Hennadiy Avdyeyenko (URS)	2.35

=== Long jump ===
RANK	1986 WORLD BEST PERFORMERS	DISTANCE
1.	Robert Emmiyan (URS)	8.61
2.	Larry Myricks (USA)	8.50
3.	Jaime Jefferson (CUB)	8.47
4.	Carl Lewis (USA)	8.35
5.	Mike Conley (USA)	8.33

=== Triple jump ===
RANK	1986 WORLD BEST PERFORMERS	DISTANCE
1.	Khristo Markov (BUL)	17.80
2.	Nikolay Musiyenko (URS)	17.78
—	Lázaro Betancourt (CUB)	17.78
4.	Mike Conley (USA)	17.69
5.	Oleg Protsenko (URS)	17.59

=== Discus ===
RANK	1986 WORLD BEST PERFORMERS	DISTANCE
1.	Jürgen Schult (GDR)	74.08
2.	Art Burns (USA)	68.70
3.	Knut Hjeltnes (NOR)	68.50
4.	Juan Martínez (CUB)	68.40
5.	Luis Delís (CUB)	68.00

=== Hammer ===
RANK	1986 WORLD BEST PERFORMERS	DISTANCE
1.	Yuriy Syedikh (URS)	86.74
2.	Sergey Litvinov (URS)	86.04
3.	Igor Nikulin (URS)	82.34
4.	Benjaminas Viluckis (URS)	82.24
5.	Günther Rodehau (GDR)	81.70

=== Shot put ===
RANK	1986 WORLD BEST PERFORMERS	DISTANCE
1.	Udo Beyer (GDR)	22.64
2.	Ulf Timmermann (GDR)	22.60
3.	Sergey Smirnov (URS)	22.24
4.	Werner Günthör (SUI)	22.22
5.	Sergey Gavryushin (URS)	22.10

=== Javelin (old design) ===
RANK	1986 WORLD BEST PERFORMERS	DISTANCE
1.	Klaus Tafelmeier (FRG)	95.74
2.	Tom Petranoff (USA)	92.38
3.	Viktor Yevsyukov (URS)	83.68
4.	Detlef Michel (GDR)	83.52
5.	Heino Puuste (URS)	83.20

=== Pole vault ===
RANK	1986 WORLD BEST PERFORMERS	HEIGHT
1.	Sergei Bubka (URS)	6.01
2.	Joe Dial (USA)	5.90
—	Thierry Vigneron (FRA)	5.90
4.	Rodion Gataullin (URS)	5.85
—	Philippe Collet (FRA)	5.85

=== Decathlon ===
RANK	1986 WORLD BEST PERFORMERS	POINTS
1.	Daley Thompson (GBR)	8811
2.	Jürgen Hingsen (FRG)	8730
3.	Siegfried Wentz (FRG)	8676
4.	Guido Kratschmer (FRG)	8519
5.	Torsten Voss (GDR)	8450

== Women's Best Year Performers ==
=== 100 metres ===
RANK	1986 WORLD BEST PERFORMERS	TIME
1.	Evelyn Ashford (USA)	10.88
2.	Heike Drechsler (GDR)	10.91
—	Marlies Göhr (GDR)	10.91
4.	Ewa Kasprzyk (POL)	10.93
5.	Silke Gladisch (GDR)	10.96

=== 200 metres ===
RANK	1986 WORLD BEST PERFORMERS	TIME
1.	Heike Drechsler (GDR)	21.71
2.	Evelyn Ashford (USA)	21.97
—	Silke Gladisch (GDR)	22.07
4.	Pam Marshall (USA)	22.12
5.	Ewa Kasprzyk (POL)	22.13

=== 400 metres ===
RANK	1986 WORLD BEST PERFORMERS	TIME
1.	Marita Koch (GDR)	48.22
2.	Olga Bryzgina (URS)	49.67
3.	Petra Müller (GDR)	49.79
4.	Tatána Kocembová (TCH)	49.83
5.	Pam Marshall (USA)	49.99

=== 800 metres ===
RANK	1986 WORLD BEST PERFORMERS	TIME
1.	Doina Melinte (ROU)	1:56.2
2.	Sigrun Wodars (GDR)	1:57.05
3.	Nadiya Olizarenko (URS)	1:57.15
4.	Lyubov Kiryukhina (URS)	1:57.18
5.	Lyubov Gurina (URS)	1:57.52

=== 1,500 metres ===
RANK	1986 WORLD BEST PERFORMERS	TIME
1.	Doina Melinte (ROU)	3:56.7
2.	Tatyana Samolenko (URS)	3:59.45
3.	Maricica Puică (ROU)	3:59.62
4.	Ravilya Agletdinova (URS)	3:59.84
5.	Lyubov Kremlyova (URS)	4:01.57

=== Mile ===
RANK	1986 WORLD BEST PERFORMERS	TIME
1.	Maricica Puică (ROU)	4:18.25
2.	Kirsty Wade (GBR)	4:21.61
3.	Doina Melinte (ROU)	4:21.88
4.	Elly van Hulst (NED)	4:22.40
5.	Ivana Walterová (TCH)	4:22.82

=== 3.000 metres ===
RANK	1986 WORLD BEST PERFORMERS	TIME
1.	Olga Bondarenko (URS)	8:33.99
2.	Ingrid Kristiansen (NOR)	8:34.10
3.	Zola Budd (GBR)	8:34.43
4.	Maricica Puică (ROU)	8:35.92
5.	Tatyana Samolenko (URS)	8:36.00

=== 5.000 metres ===
RANK	1986 WORLD BEST PERFORMERS	TIME
1.	Ingrid Kristiansen (NOR)	14:37.33
2.	Svetlana Guskova (URS)	15:02.12
3.	Olga Bondarenko (URS)	15:03.51
4.	Svetlana Ulmasova (URS)	15:05.50
5.	Lynn Jennings (USA)	15:08.36

=== 10,000 metres ===
RANK	1986 WORLD BEST PERFORMERS	TIME
1.	Ingrid Kristiansen (NOR)	30:13.74
2.	Olga Bondarenko (URS)	30:57.21
3.	Ulrike Bruns (GDR)	31:19.76
4.	Aurora Cunha (POR)	31:29.41
5.	Liz Lynch (GBR)	31:41.42

=== Half Marathon ===
RANK	1986 WORLD BEST PERFORMERS	TIME
1.	Ingrid Kristiansen (NOR)	1:09:03

=== 100m Hurdles ===
RANK	1986 WORLD BEST PERFORMERS	TIME
1.	Yordanka Donkova (BUL)	12.26
2.	Ginka Zagorcheva (BUL)	12.39
3.	Cornelia Oschkenat (GDR)	12.50
4.	Nataliya Grygoryeva (URS)	12.61
5.	Heike Theele (GDR)	12.63

=== 400m Hurdles ===
RANK	1986 WORLD BEST PERFORMERS	TIME
1.	Marina Stepanova (URS)	52.94
2.	Sabine Busch (GDR)	53.60
3.	Myrtle Bothma (RSA)	53.74
4.	Debbie Flintoff (AUS)	53.76
5.	Cornelia Feuerbach (GDR)	54.13

=== High jump ===
RANK	1986 WORLD BEST PERFORMERS	HEIGHT
1.	Stefka Kostadinova (BUL)	2.08 m
2.	Olga Turchak (URS)	2.01 m
—	Desiree du Plessis (RSA)	2.01 m
4.	Charmaine Weavers (RSA)	1.99 m
—	Silvia Costa (CUB)	1.99 m

=== Long jump ===
RANK	1986 WORLD BEST PERFORMERS	DISTANCE
1.	Heike Drechsler (GDR)	7.45 m
2.	Galina Chistyakova (URS)	7.34 m
3.	Yelena Belevskaya (URS)	7.31 m
4.	Irena Ozhenko (URS)	7.20 m
5.	Larisa Berezhnaya (URS)	7.19 m

=== Shot put ===
RANK	1986 WORLD BEST PERFORMERS	DISTANCE
1.	Natalya Lisovskaya (URS)	21.70 m
2.	Ines Müller (GDR)	21.45 m
3.	Natalya Akhrimenko (URS)	21.39 m
4.	Heidi Krieger (GDR)	21.10 m
5.	Claudia Losch (FRG)	20.92 m

=== Javelin (old design) ===
RANK	1986 WORLD BEST PERFORMERS	DISTANCE
1.	Fatima Whitbread (GBR)	77.44
2.	petra Felke (GDR)	75.04
3.	Tiina Lillak (FIN)	72.42
4.	María Caridad Colón (CUB)	70.14
5.	Ivonne Leal (CUB)	69.82

=== Heptathlon ===
RANK	1986 WORLD BEST PERFORMERS	POINTS
1.	Jackie Joyner-Kersee (USA)	7158
2.	Anke Behmer (GDR)	6717
3.	Natalya Shubenkova (URS)	6645
4.	Sibylle Thiele (GDR)	6635
5.	Judy Simpson (GBR)	6623

== Marathon ==
=== Year Rankings ===
==== Men ====
RANK	ATHLETE	TIME	DATE	EVENT
1.	(Australia) Robert de Castella (AUS)	2:07.51	April 21	Boston, United States
2.	(South Africa) Zithulele Sinqe (RSA)	2:08.04	May 3	Port Elizabeth, South Africa
3.	(Tanzania) Juma Ikangaa (TAN)	2:08.10	February 9	Tokyo, Japan
4.	(South Africa) Willie Mtolo (RSA)	2:08.15	May 3	Port Elizabeth, South Africa
5.	(Japan) Takeyuki Nakayama (JPN)	2:08.21	October 5	Seoul, South Korea
6.	(Japan) Toshihiko Seko (JPN)	2:08.27	October 26	Chicago, United States
7.	(Ethiopia) Belayneh Dinsamo (ETH)	2:08.29	February 9	Tokyo, Japan
8.	(Ethiopia) Abebe Mekonnen (ETH)	2:08.39	February 9	Tokyo, Japan
9.	(Japan) Takeyuki Nakayama (JPN)	2:08.43	February 9	Tokyo, Japan
10.	(Ethiopia) Abebe Mekonnen (ETH)	2:09.08	April 19	Rotterdam, Netherlands

==== Women ====
RANK	ATHLETE	TIME	DATE	EVENT
1.	(Norway) Grete Waitz (NOR)	2:24:54	April 20	London, United Kingdom
2.	(Norway) Ingrid Kristiansen (NOR)	2:24:55	April 21	Boston, United States
3.	(Australia) Lisa Ondieki (AUS)	2:26:07	August 1	Edinburgh, Scotland
4.	(Norway) Ingrid Kristiansen (NOR)	2:27:08	October 26	Chicago, United States
5.	(Portugal) Rosa Mota (POR)	2:27:15	November 16	Tokyo, Japan
6.	(Netherlands) Carla Beurskens (NED)	2:27:35	April 21	Boston, United States
7.	(Norway) Grete Waitz (NOR)	2:28:06	November 2	New York, United States
8.	(New Zealand) Lorraine Moller (NZL)	2:28:17	August 1	Edinburgh, Scotland
9.	(Portugal) Rosa Mota (POR)	2:28:38	August 26	Stuttgart, West Germany
10.	(Hungary) Ágnes Sipka (HUN)	2:28:51	October 26	Budapest, Hungary

=== National Champions ===
NATION	MEN'S WINNER	TIME	WOMEN'S WINNER	TIME	PLACE	DATE
Australia	Stephen Austin	2:15:59	Margaret Reddan	2:48:28	Sydney	June 8
Canada	Agustin Diaz Romero	2:20:36	Ellen Rochefort	2:35:51	Montreal	September 28
(Japan)	Toshihiro Shibutani	2:14:55	—	—	Ōtsu	March 9
Netherlands	Adri Hartveld	2:15:32	Eefje van Wissen	2:40:07	Maassluis	April 12
(Spain)	Santiago de la Parte	2:16:37	Maercedes Calleja	2:40:24	Lorca	May 24
West Germany	Wolfgang Krüger	2:15:20	Heidi Hutterer	2:36:44	Stuttgart	April 20

=== International Races ===
DATE	MARATHON	NATION	MEN'S WINNER	TIME	WOMEN'S WINNER	TIME
January 11	Miami	United States	(France) Bernard Bobes	2:21:26	(United States) Shirley Silsby	2:53:18
January 19	Hamilton	Bermuda	(United States) Jerrold Wynia	2:24:03	(Canada) Sharon Crawford	2:58:17
January 19	Manila	Philippines	(Belgium) Eddy Hellebuyck	2:19:00	(Canada) Tani Ruckle	2:46:58
January 26	Hong Kong	Hong Kong	(China) Shu Chun Zhu	2:15:08	(China) Yan Min Wen	2:36:55
January 26	Osaka	(Japan)	—	—	(New Zealand) Lorraine Moller	2:30:24
February 1	Auckland	New Zealand	(Denmark) Allan Zachariasen	2:12:36	(Denmark) Kiersti Jakobsen	2:36:58
February 2	Beppu	(Japan)	(Japan) Taisuke Kodama	2:10:34	—	—
February 2	Long Beach	United States	(United States) Ric Sayre	2:13:22	(United States) Mary Tracey	2:48:01
February 9	Tokyo	(Japan)	(Tanzania) Juma Ikangaa	2:08:10	—	—
February 16	Valencia	(Spain)	(Poland) Pawel Lorens	2:16:31	(Poland) Malgorzata Szuminska	2:46:31
March 9	Arusha	Tanzania	(Tanzania) Japhet Mashishanga	2:21:01	(Tanzania) Leokadia Katona	4:03:30
March 9	Los Angeles	United States	(United States) Ric Sayre	2:12:59	(United States) Nancy Ditz	2:36:27
March 16	Barcelona	(Spain)	(Belgium) Frederick Vandervennet	2:15:45	(United Kingdom) Deborah Heath	2:48:22
April 13	Lyon	France	(France) Alain Lazare	2:15:07	(France) Marie-Jeanne Maury	2:54:48
April 13	Vienna	Austria	(Austria) Gerhard Hartmann	2:12:22	(West Germany) Birgit Lennartz	2:38:31
April 19	Rotterdam	Netherlands	(Ethiopia) Abebe Mekonnen	2:09:09	(Sweden) Ellinor Ljungros	2:41:06
April 20	Budapest	Hungary	(Hungary) Sandor Szendrei	2:16:18	(Hungary) Agota Farkas	2:47:10
April 20	London	United Kingdom	(Japan) Toshihiko Seko	2:10:02	(Norway) Grete Waitz	2:24:54
April 21	Boston	United States	(Australia) Robert de Castella	2:07:51	(Norway) Ingrid Kristiansen	2:24:55
April 27	Bremen	West Germany	(Sweden) Jozef Machalek	2:15:58	(West Germany) Elke Kramer	2:48:38
April 27	Madrid	(Spain)	(Spain) Ramiro Matamoros	2:17:04	(Spain) Consuelo Alonso	2:43:21
May 1	Rome	Italy	(Italy) Osvaldo Faustini	2:16:03	(United States) Katherine Gregory	3:23:43
May 4	Munich	West Germany	(Hungary) István Kerékjártó	2:17:46	(West Germany) Olivia Gruner	2:38:51
May 4	Paris	France	(Djibouti) Hussein Ahmed Salah	2:12:44	(France) Maria Rebelo-Lelut	2:32:18
May 4	Vancouver	Canada	(Japan) Hiromi Nishi	2:21:14	(Canada) Joi Belyk	2:45:37
May 5	Belfast	Northern Ireland	(Northern Ireland) Martin Deane	2:16:05	(Northern Ireland) Moira O'Neill	2:43:26
May 11	Amsterdam	Netherlands	(Belgium) William Vanhuylenbroek	2:14:46	(Republic of Ireland) Teresa Kidd	2:46:18
May 11	Geneva	Switzerland	(France) Bernard Bobes	2:18:11	(Soviet Union) Nadezhda Gumerova	2:38:33
May 18	Pittsburgh	United States	(United States) Dean Matthews	2:18:17	(Italy) Laura Fogli	2:37:04
May 18	Venice	Italy	(Italy) Salvatore Bettiol	2:18:44	(Italy) Paola Moro	2:38:10
May 25	Hamburg	West Germany	(Belgium) Karel Lismont	2:12:12	(Belgium) Magda Ilands	2:35:17
June 1	Christchurch	New Zealand	(New Zealand) John Campbell	2:15:19	(New Zealand) Sharon Higgins	2:45:44
June 7	Stockholm	Sweden	(Sweden) Kjell-Erik Ståhl	2:12:33	(Sweden) Evy Palm	2:34:42
June 8	Sydney	Australia	(Brazil) Eloi Schleder	2:12:54	(New Zealand) Ngaire Drake	2:38:52
July 20	San Francisco	United States	(United States) Peter Pfitzinger	2:13:29	(Mexico) Maria Trujillo	2:37:57
August 1	CW Games	Edinburgh, Scotland	(Australia) Robert de Castella	2:10:15	(Australia) Lisa Ondieki	2:26:07
August 2	Helsinki	Finland	(Sweden) Tommy Persson	2:17:11	(Finland) Sinikka Kiippa	2:49:29
August 17	Bolton	United Kingdom	(United Kingdom) Michael Neary	2:19:25	—	—
August 24	Reykjavik	Iceland	(France) Mokfi Chaibi	2:20:30	(United Kingdom) Carol Macario	2:58:09
August 24	Rio de Janeiro	Brazil	(Brazil) Eloi Schleder	2:22:02	(United States) Elizabeth McElhinny	2:46:54
August 26	European Championships	Stuttgart, West Germany	—	—	(Portugal) Rosa Mota	2:28:38
August 30	European Championships	Stuttgart, West Germany	(Italy) Gelindo Bordin	2:10:54	—	—
August 31	Adelaide	Australia	(Australia) Peter Bourgaize	2:25:16	(Australia) Desiree Letherby	2:59:20
September 6	Antwerp	Belgium	(Belgium) François Blommaerts	2:17:48	(Belgium) Denise Verhaert	2:42:44
September 13	Oslo	Norway	(Sweden) Kjell-Erik Ståhl	2:14:59	(Norway) Sissel Grottenberg	2:40:01
September 21	Niagara	Canada	(Japan) Kazuya Nishimoto	2:17:35	(Italy) Mariagrazia Savasta	2:50:49
September 21	Glasgow	United Kingdom	(United Kingdom) Kenneth Stewart	2:14:04	(United Kingdom) Sandra Branney	2:37:29
September 28	Berlin	West Berlin	(Poland) Boguslaw Psujek	2:11:03	(West Germany) Charlotte Teske	2:32:10
September 28	Brussels	Belgium	(Belgium) Dirk Vanderherten	2:15:32	(Belgium) Nelly Aerts	2:42:02
September 28	Ciudad Mexico	Mexico	(Mexico) Manuel Garcia Perez	2:20:03	(Mexico) Mericarmen Cardenas	2:42:25
September 28	Montreal	Canada	(Ethiopia) Abebe Mekonnen	2:10:31	(Canada) Helene Rochefort	2:35:51
September 28	Perth	Australia	(Japan) Futoshi Shinohara	2:18:17	(New Zealand) Bernardine Portenski	2:53:54
September 28	Portland	United States	(United States) Leonard Hill	2:18:54	(Italy) Kathleen Angel	2:47:02
October 1	Asian Games	Seoul, South Korea	—	—	(Japan) Eriko Asai	2:41:03
October 5	Asian Games	Seoul, South Korea	(Japan) Takeyuki Nakayama	2:08:21	—	—
October 12	Athens	Greece	(Belgium) Jos vander Water	2:27:22	(Norway) Signe Ward	3:06:58
October 12	Buenos Aires	Argentina	(Argentina) Raimundo Manquel	2:21:10	(Brazil) Angélica de Almeida	2:54:47
October 12	Melbourne	Australia	(Switzerland) Richard Umberg	2:17:21	(Canada) Tani Ruckle	2:36:06
October 19	Beijing	(China)	(Japan) Taisuke Kodama	2:07:35	—	—
October 26	Chicago	United States	(Japan) Toshihiko Seko	2:08:27	(Norway) Ingrid Kristiansen	2:27:08
October 26	Hamilton	New Zealand	(Poland) Wojciech Ratkowski	2:18:13	(New Zealand) Carol Raven	3:07:16
October 26	Lisbon	Portugal	(Portugal) Cidalio Caetano	2:16:49	(Portugal) Maria Lousada	3:20:26
October 26	Nuremberg	West Germany	(Poland) Ryszard Przybyla	2:19:44	—	—
October 27	Dublin	(Republic of Ireland) Ireland	(Republic of Ireland) Dick Hooper	2:18:10	(United Kingdom) Maureen Hurst	2:46:29
November 2	Istanbul	Turkey	(Turkey) Hanefi Atmaca	2:23:20	—	—
November 2	New York City	United States	(Italy) Piergiovanni Poli	2:11:06	(Norway) Grete Waitz	2:28:06
November 16	Tokyo	(Japan)	—	—	(Portugal) Rosa Mota	2:27:15
December 7	Fukuoka	(Japan)	(Tanzania) Juma Ikangaa	2:10:06	—	—
December 7	Kawaguchi	(Japan)	(Japan) Tetsuji Iwase	2:19:54	(Japan) Tomoko Suzuki	2:50:10
December 7	Honolulu	United States	(Kenya) Ibrahim Hussein	2:11:44	(Netherlands) Carla Beurskens	2:31:02
December 17	Tiberias Marathon	Israel	(Israel) Yair Karni	2:23:12	(West Germany) Kerstin Preßler	2:36:33

== Births ==
- January 5 – Roman Novotný, Czech long jumper
- January 11 – Claudio Licciardello, Italian sprinter
- January 15 – Mariya Abakumova, Russian javelin thrower
- January 17 – Sherry Fletcher, Grenadian sprinter
- January 23 – Gelete Burka, Ethiopian middle-distance runner
- January 24 – Montell Douglas, British sprinter
- January 31 – Walter Dix, American sprinter
- February 11 – Bob Altena, Dutch decathlete
- April 1 – Yurika Nakamura, Japanese long-distance runner
- April 2 – Moses Aliwa, Ugandan long-distance runner
- April 4 – Evelyne Nganga, Kenyan long-distance runner
- April 29 – Ingus Janevics, Latvian race walker
- May 2 – Samuel Muturi Mugo, Kenyan long-distance runner
- May 16 – Eleni Artymata, Cypriot sprinter
- June 3 – Micah Kogo, Kenyan long-distance runner
- June 8 – Yadira Guamán, Ecuadorian race walker
- June 10 – Amr Ibrahim Mostafa Seoud, Egyptian sprinter
- June 27 – LaShawn Merritt, American sprinter
- July 3 – Robina Muqimyar, Afghan sprinter
- July 17 – Viktor Kuznyetsov, Ukrainian long jumper and triple jumper
- July 19 – Philes Ongori, Kenyan long-distance runner
- July 26 – Mattias Claesson, Swedish middle-distance runner
- July 26 – Angela Moroșanu, Romanian sprinter
- July 28 – Nancy Wambui, Kenyan long-distance runner
- July 28 – Nickiesha Wilson, Jamaican hurdler
- August 3 – Fartun Abukar Omar, Somali athlete
- August 21 – Usain Bolt, Jamaican sprinter
- August 29 – Yerefu Birhanu, Ethiopian long-distance runner
- September 9 – Daniel Bailey, Antigua and Barbuda sprinter
- November 1 – Ksenija Balta, Estonian long jumper, sprinter and heptathlete
- November 10 – Samuel Wanjiru, Kenyan long-distance runner
- November 13 – Sergey Bakulin, Russian race walker
- November 21 – Aleksandra Zelenina, Moldovan long and triple jumper
- December 7 – Olga Mikhaylova, Russian race walker

== Deaths ==
- April 13 – Sulo Bärlund (75), Finnish shot putter (b. 1910)
