= 1987 IAAF World Indoor Championships – Women's shot put =

The women's shot put event at the 1987 IAAF World Indoor Championships was held at the Hoosier Dome in Indianapolis on 6 March.

== Results ==
| Rank | Name | Nationality | #1 | #2 | #3 | #4 | #5 | #6 | Result | Notes |
|---|---|---|---|---|---|---|---|---|---|---|
| 1st place, gold medalist(s) | Natalya Lisovskaya | Soviet Union | 20.12 | 20.09 | 19.81 | 20.01 | 19.99 | 20.52 | 20.52 | CR |
| 2nd place, silver medalist(s) | Ilona Briesenick | East Germany | 19.60 | 19.58 | 19.77 | 20.18 | 20.28 | 20.07 | 20.28 | |
| 3rd place, bronze medalist(s) | Claudia Losch | West Germany | 18.66 | 19.66 | 19.52 | 20.14 | 19.76 | 19.65 | 20.14 | |
| 4 | Heidi Krieger | East Germany | 20.00 | 19.69 | x | x | x | 19.04 | 20.00 | |
| 5 | Natalya Akhrimenko | Soviet Union | 19.17 | 19.32 | x | x | x | x | 19.32 | |
| 6 | Ramona Pagel | United States | 18.27 | 18.93 | 17.59 | 18.81 | 19.25 | 17.96 | 19.25 | |
| 7 | Mihaela Loghin | Romania | 18.27 | 17.64 | 18.44 | x | x | 18.17 | 18.44 | |
| 8 | Iris Plotzitzka | West Germany | 17.97 | x | x | 17.75 | 17.90 | 17.70 | 17.97 | |
| 9 | Judy Oakes | Great Britain | x | 17.65 | 17.85 | | | | 17.85 | |
| 10 | Myrtle Augee | Great Britain | 17.85 | 17.39 | 17.44 | | | | 17.85 | |
| 11 | Peggy Pollock | United States | 17.34 | x | 17.49 | | | | 17.49 | |
| 12 | Ursula Stäheli | Switzerland | 16.26 | 16.43 | 16.98 | | | | 16.98 | |
| 13 | Cong Yuzhen | China | 15.68 | 16.23 | 16.44 | | | | 16.44 | |
