= 1987 European Athletics Indoor Championships – Women's shot put =

The women's shot put event at the 1987 European Athletics Indoor Championships was held on 22 February.

== Results ==
Rank	Name	Nationality	#1	#2	#3	#4	#5	#6	Result	Notes
1st place, gold medalist(s)	Natalya Akhrimenko	Soviet Union	20.69	20.49	x	20.84	20.60	20.45	20.84	
2nd place, silver medalist(s)	Heidi Krieger	East Germany	20.02	x	19.50	19.77	x	x	20.02	
3rd place, bronze medalist(s)	Heike Hartwig	East Germany	19.43	20.00	x	x	x	x	20.00	
4	Iris Plotzitzka	West Germany	18.93	18.47	x	17.93	18.88	18.16	18.93	
5	Stephanie Storp	West Germany	x	18.53	18.19	18.55	18.00	x	18.55	
6	Judy Oakes	Great Britain	17.35	18.06	18.14	17.75	x	x	18.14	
7	Myrtle Augee	Great Britain	17.38	17.67	x	17.61	17.03	17.34	17.67	
8	Ursula Stäheli	Switzerland	17.37	17.67	x	16.98	x	17.36	17.67	
9	Margarita Ramos	Spain	14.49	14.54	13.97				14.54	
