= 1987 World Championships in Athletics – Women's shot put =

These are the official results of the Women's Shot Put event at the 1987 World Championships in Rome, Italy. The final was held on Saturday September 5, 1987.

== Medalists ==
Gold	Natalya Lisovskaya; Soviet Union (URS)
Silver	Kathrin Neimke; East Germany (GDR)
Bronze	Ines Müller; East Germany (GDR)

== Schedule ==
- All times are Central European Time (UTC+1)

Qualification Round
Group A	Group B
04.09.1987 – ??:??h	04.09.1987 – ??:??h
Final Round
05.09.1987 – 18:00h

== Abbreviations ==
- All results shown are in metres

Q	automatic qualification
q	qualification by rank
DNS	did not start
NM	no mark
WR	world record
AR	area record
NR	national record
PB	personal best
SB	season best

== Records ==
Standing records prior to the 1987 World Athletics Championships
World Record	Natalya Lisovskaya (URS)	22.63 m	June 7, 1987	Moscow, Soviet Union
Event Record	Helena Fibingerová (TCH)	21.05 m	August 12, 1983	Helsinki, Finland
Broken records during the 1987 World Athletics Championships
Event Record	Kathrin Neimke (GDR)	21.21 m	September 5, 1987	Rome, Italy
Event Record	Natalya Lisovskaya (URS)	21.24 m	September 5, 1987	Rome, Italy

== Qualification ==
- Held on Friday 1987-09-04

RANK	GROUP A	DISTANCE
1.	Kathrin Neimke (GDR)	20.26 m
2.	Claudia Losch (FRG)	19.73 m
3.	Li Meisu (CHN)	19.47 m
4.	Heike Hartwig (GDR)	19.35 m
5.	Natalya Lisovskaya (URS)	19.22 m
6.	Soňa Vašíčková (TCH)	19.09 m
7.	Iris Plotzitzka (FRG)	19.08 m
8.	Judy Oakes (GBR)	18.43 m
9.	Ramona Pagel (USA)	18.12 m
10.	Asta Hovi-Ovaska (FIN)	17.89 m

RANK	GROUP B	DISTANCE
1.	Helena Fibingerová (TCH)	20.40 m
2.	Ines Müller (GDR)	19.96 m
3.	Stephanie Storp (FRG)	19.64 m
4.	Mihaela Loghin (ROU)	19.27 m
5.	Natalya Akhrimenko (URS)	19.21 m
6.	Huang Zhihong (CHN)	19.18 m
7.	Svetla Mitkova (BUL)	19.07 m
8.	Bonnie Dasse (USA)	17.68 m
9.	Deborah Saint-Phard (HAI)	16.54 m
10.	Melody Torcolacci (CAN)	15.98 m

== Final ==
Rank	Athlete	Attempts						Distance	Note
Rank	Athlete	1	2	3	4	5	6	Distance	Note
1st place, gold medalist(s)	Natalya Lisovskaya (URS)	20.89	20.22	21.16	20.93	21.24	20.80	21.24 m	CR
2nd place, silver medalist(s)	Kathrin Neimke (GDR)	20.32	21.21	20.12	20.53	20.59	X	21.21 m	PB
3rd place, bronze medalist(s)	Ines Müller (GDR)	20.76	20.11	20.05	X	19.96	20.20	20.76 m	PB
4	Claudia Losch (FRG)	20.05	20.73	X	19.88	20.33	20.61	20.73 m	
5	Natalya Akhrimenko (URS)	20.20	19.68	20.53	20.09	X	20.68	20.68 m	
6	Heike Hartwig (GDR)	19.79	19.97	19.84	20.63	X	20.25	20.63 m	
7	Li Meisu (CHN)	19.95	20.00	20.09	18.74	20.43	19.98	20.43 m	PB
8	Helena Fibingerová (TCH)	19.97	X	19.51	20.05	20.15	20.29	20.29 m	
9	Svetla Mitkova (BUL)							19.37m	
10	Stephanie Storp (FRG)							19.36 m	
11	Huang Zhihong (CHN)							19.35 m	PB
12	Iris Plotzitzka (FRG)							19.19 m	
13	Soňa Vašíčková (TCH)							18.71 m	
—	Mihaela Loghin (ROU)							DNS	

== See also ==
- 1982 Women's European Championships Shot Put (Athens)
- 1984 Women's Olympic Shot Put (Los Angeles)
- 1986 Women's European Championships Shot Put (Stuttgart)
- 1987 Shot Put Year Ranking
- 1988 Women's Olympic Shot Put (Seoul)
