= 1993 World Championships in Athletics – Women's shot put =

Athletics event

These are the official results of the Women's Shot Put event at the 1993 IAAF World Championships in Stuttgart, Germany. There were a total of 27 participating athletes, with the final held on Sunday August 15, 1993. The qualification mark was set at 19.00 metres.

== Medalists ==
Gold	Huang Zhihong; PR China (CHN)
Silver	Svetlana Krivelyova; Russia (RUS)
Bronze	Kathrin Neimke; Germany (GER)

== Schedule ==
- All times are Central European Time (UTC+1)

Qualification Round
Group A	Group B
14.08.1993 – 18:00h	14.08.1993 – 18:00h
Final Round
15.08.1993 – 19:20h

== Abbreviations ==
- All results shown are in metres

Q	automatic qualification
q	qualification by rank
DNS	did not start
NM	no mark
WR	world record
AR	area record
NR	national record
PB	personal best
SB	season best

== Records ==
Standing records prior to the 1993 World Athletics Championships
World Record	Natalya Lisovskaya (URS)	22.63 m	June 7, 1987	Moscow, Soviet Union
Event Record	Natalya Lisovskaya (URS)	21.24 m	September 5, 1987	Rome, Italy

== Qualification ==
- Held on Saturday 1993-08-14

RANK	GROUP A	DISTANCE
1.	Huang Zhihong (CHN)	19.36 m
2.	Svetla Mitkova (BUL)	19.16 m
3.	Kathrin Neimke (GER)	19.11 m
4.	Belsy Laza (CUB)	19.02 m
5.	Larisa Peleshenko (RUS)	18.84 m
6.	Anna Romanova (RUS)	18.12 m
7.	Connie Price-Smith (USA)	18.09 m
8.	Vita Pavlysh (UKR)	18.00 m
9.	Jana Ciobanu (ROM)	17.77 m
10.	Danijela Čurović (IWP)	16.91 m
11.	Marika Tuliniemi (FIN)	16.80 m
12.	Elisangela Adriano (BRA)	16.41 m
13.	Nataša Erjavec (SLO)	15.71 m

RANK	GROUP B	DISTANCE
1.	Svetlana Krivelyova (RUS)	19.96 m
2.	Astrid Kumbernuss (GER)	19.92 m
3.	Sui Xinmei (CHN)	19.67 m
4.	Stephanie Storp (GER)	19.38 m
5.	Valentina Fedyushina (UKR)	19.04 m
6.	Cong Yuzhen (CHN)	18.97 m
7.	Ramona Pagel (USA)	18.54 m
8.	Krystyna Danilczyk-Zabawska (POL)	17.62 m
9.	Lisette Martínez (CUB)	17.44 m
10.	Agnese Maffeis (ITA)	16.61 m
11.	Myrtle Augee (GBR)	16.06 m
12.	Christy Barrett (USA)	14.58 m
13.	Aye Aye Nwe (MYA)	13.88 m
14.	Tea Ai Seng (BRU)	12.23 m

== Final ==
Rank	Athlete	Attempts						Distance	Note
Rank	Athlete	1	2	3	4	5	6	Distance	Note
1st place, gold medalist(s)	Huang Zhihong (CHN)	19.75	20.31	20.19	20.57	x	20.46	20.57 m	
2nd place, silver medalist(s)	Svetlana Krivelyova (RUS)	19.97	19.57	x	x	19.56	x	19.97 m	
3rd place, bronze medalist(s)	Kathrin Neimke (GER)	19.71	19.36	x	x	19.25	19.19	19.71 m	
4	Sui Xinmei (CHN)	19.46	19.61	19.49	19.46	x	19.51	19.61 m	
5	Cong Yuzhen (CHN)	18.64	18.83	19.26	19.23	19.50	19.58	19.58 m	
6	Astrid Kumbernuss (GER)	19.42	18.99	19.02	19.32	19.33	19.15	19.42 m	
7	Valentina Fedyushina (UKR)	18.71	19.18	19.27	x	x	18.69	19.27 m	
8	Belsy Laza (CUB)	18.09	18.98	19.27	18.79	x	-	19.27 m	
9	Larisa Peleshenko (RUS)							19.22 m	
10	Svetla Mitkova (BUL)							18.91 m	
11	Stephanie Storp (GER)							18.83 m	
12	Ramona Pagel (USA)							17.77 m	

== See also ==
- 1990 Women's European Championships Shot Put (Split)
- 1992 Women's Olympic Shot Put (Barcelona)
- 1993 Shot Put Year Ranking
- 1994 Women's European Championships Shot Put (Helsinki)
