= 1990 European Athletics Indoor Championships – Women's shot put =

The women's shot put event at the 1990 European Athletics Indoor Championships was held in Kelvin Hall on 4 March.

== Results ==
Rank	Name	Nationality	#1	#2	#3	#4	#5	#6	Result	Notes
1st place, gold medalist(s)	Claudia Losch	West Germany	20.64	19.70	19.74	20.16	20.09	19.01	20.64	
2nd place, silver medalist(s)	Natalya Lisovskaya	Soviet Union							20.35	
3rd place, bronze medalist(s)	Grit Hammer	East Germany							19.53	
4	Astrid Kumbernuss	East Germany							19.50	
5	Iris Plotzitzka	West Germany							18.67	
6	Stephanie Storp	West Germany							18.64	
7	Renata Bruková	Czechoslovakia							18.50	
8	Agnese Maffeis	Italy							16.79	
9	Annick Maurice	France							16.01	
10	Yvonne Hanson-Nortey	Great Britain							15.72	
11	Teresa Machado	Portugal							15.26	
