= 1986 European Athletics Indoor Championships – Women's shot put =

The women's shot put event at the 1986 European Athletics Indoor Championships was held on 22 February.

== Results ==
Rank	Name	Nationality	#1	#2	#3	#4	#5	#6	Result	Notes
1st place, gold medalist(s)	Claudia Losch	West Germany	19.14	20.48	20.07	x	20.36	20.02	20.48	
2nd place, silver medalist(s)	Heidi Krieger	East Germany	19.96	19.95	19.76	19.89	19.91	20.21	20.21	
3rd place, bronze medalist(s)	Mihaela Loghin	Romania	x	19.07	x	18.16	x	x	19.07	
4	Nunu Abashidze	Soviet Union	x	x	17.56	x	x	18.44	18.44	
5	Petra Leidinger	East Germany	17.24	17.40	18.11	18.19	18.26	18.24	18.26	
6	Asta Hovi	Finland	17.00	x	17.42	17.24	17.84	17.15	17.84	NR
7	Stephanie Storp	West Germany	17.12	17.57	x	17.80	x	x	17.80	
8	Soňa Vašíčková	Czechoslovakia	16.81	x	17.52	17.20	x	x	17.52	
9	Myrtle Augee	Great Britain	15.66	x	17.24				17.24	
10	Ursula Stäheli	Switzerland	16.64	17.02	16.87				17.02	
	Enriqueta Díaz	Spain	x	x	x				NM	
