= 1989 European Athletics Indoor Championships – Women's shot put =

The women's shot put event at the 1989 European Athletics Indoor Championships was held on 19 February.

== Results ==
Rank	Name	Nationality	Result	Notes
1st place, gold medalist(s)	Stephanie Storp	West Germany	20.30	
2nd place, silver medalist(s)	Heike Hartwig	East Germany	20.03	
3rd place, bronze medalist(s)	Iris Plotzitzka	West Germany	19.79	
4	Soňa Vašíčková	Czechoslovakia	19.32	
5	Viktoria Horváth	Hungary	17.75	
6	Agnese Maffeis	Italy	17.32	
7	Myrtle Augee	Great Britain	17.17	
8	Yvonne Hanson-Nortey	Great Britain	16.59	
9	Margarita Ramos	Spain	16.22	
