= 1986 European Athletics Championships – Women's shot put =

Women's shot put at the European Athletics Championships

The women's shot put event at the 1986 European Championships in Stuttgart, West Germany, was held at Neckarstadion on 26 August 1986.

== Medalists ==
Gold	Heidi Krieger; East Germany
Silver	Ines Müller; East Germany
Bronze	Natalya Akhrimenko; Soviet Union

== Final ==
Rank	Final	Distance
	Heidi Krieger (GDR)	21.10 m
	Ines Müller (GDR)	20.81 m
	Natalya Akhrimenko (URS)	20.68 m
4.	Claudia Losch (FRG)	20.54 m
5.	Heike Hartwig (GDR)	20.14 m
6.	Nunu Abashidze (URS)	19.99 m
7.	Iris Plotzitzka (FRG)	19.26 m
8.	Mihaela Loghin (ROU)	19.15 m
9.	Natalya Lisovskaya (URS)	18.95 m
10.	Helena Fibingerová (TCH)	18.48 m
11.	Stephanie Storp (FRG)	18.45 m
12.	Svetla Mitkova (BUL)	18.35 m
13.	Soňa Vašíčková (TCH)	17.89 m
14.	Judy Oakes (GBR)	17.85 m
15.	Asta Hovi (FIN)	17.82 m
16.	Ursula Stäheli (SUI)	17.08 m
17.	Myrtle Augee (GBR)	16.37 m

== Participation ==
According to an unofficial count, 17 athletes from 9 countries participated in the event.

- Bulgaria (1)
- Czechoslovakia (2)
- East Germany (3)
- Finland (1)
- Romania (1)
- Soviet Union (3)
- Switzerland (1)
- United Kingdom (2)
- West Germany (3)

== See also ==
- 1980 Women's Olympic Shot Put (Moscow)
- 1983 Women's World Championships Shot Put (Helsinki)
- 1984 Women's Olympic Shot Put (Los Angeles)
- 1986 Shot Put Year Ranking
- 1987 Women's World Championships Shot Put (Rome)
- 1988 Women's Olympic Shot Put (Seoul)
