= Yvonne Hanson-Nortey =

English shot putter (born 1964)

Personal information
- Nationality: British (English)
- Born: 18 February 1964 (age 62) Croydon, Greater London, England
- Height: 185 cm (6 ft 1 in)
- Weight: 91 kg (201 lb)

Sport
- Sport: Athletics
- Club: Hallamshire Harriers
Medal record
Athletics
Representing England
Commonwealth Games
Bronze medal – third place	1990 Auckland	shot put

Yvonne Wendy Hanson-Nortey (born 18 February 1964, in Croydon, Greater London) is a retired female shot putter from England. She was affiliated with the Hallamshire Harriers.

== Biography ==
Hanson-Nortey finished third behind Judy Oakes in the shot put event for five consecutive years at the WAAA Championships from 1984 to 1988. and the 1985 WAAA Championships.

Hanson-Nortey represented England, at the 1986 Commonwealth Games in Edinburgh, Scotland.

In 1989 she set her personal best put of 17.45 metres, which she achieved in July, in London (Crystal Palace). This placed her sixth on the British outdoor all-time list, behind Judy Oakes, Myrtle Augee, Meg Ritchie, Venissa Head and Angela Littlewood. Hanson-Nortey clinched second place behind Myrtle Augee at the 1989 AAA Championships and the 1992 AAA Championships.

The following year, she represented England and won a bronze medal in the shot put event, at the 1990 Commonwealth Games in Auckland, New Zealand.

== International competitions ==
Year	Competition	Venue	Position	Event	Notes
Representing Great Britain and England
1986	Commonwealth Games	Edinburgh, United Kingdom	5th	Shot put	16.52 m
1988	Olympic Games	Seoul, South Korea	21st	Shot put	15.13 m
1989	European Indoor Championships	The Hague, Netherlands	7th	Shot put	16.59 m
1990	Commonwealth Games	Auckland, New Zealand	3rd	Shot put	16.00 m
1990	European Indoor Championships	Glasgow, United Kingdom	10th	Shot put	15.72 m
