= 1991 World Championships in Athletics – Women's shot put =

These are the official results of the Women's Shot Put event at the 1991 IAAF World Championships in Tokyo, Japan. There were a total number of 24 participating athletes, with two qualifying groups and the final held on Saturday August 24, 1991. The qualification mark was set at 18.50 metres.

== Medalists ==
Gold	Huang Zhihong; PR China (CHN)
Silver	Natalya Lisovskaya; Soviet Union (URS)
Bronze	Svetlana Krivelyova; Soviet Union (URS)

== Schedule ==
- All times are Japan Standard Time (UTC+9)

Qualification Round
Group A	Group B
24.08.1991 – 09:30h	24.08.1991 – 09:30h
Final Round
24.08.1991 – 17:40h

== Abbreviations ==
- All results shown are in metres

Q	automatic qualification
q	qualification by rank
DNS	did not start
NM	no mark
WR	world record
AR	area record
NR	national record
PB	personal best
SB	season best

== Records ==
Standing records prior to the 1991 World Athletics Championships
World Record	Natalya Lisovskaya (URS)	22.63 m	June 7, 1987	Moscow, Soviet Union
Event Record	Natalya Lisovskaya (URS)	21.24 m	September 5, 1987	Rome, Italy

== Qualifying round ==
RANK	GROUP A	DISTANCE
1.	Natalya Lisovskaya (URS)	19.72 m
2.	Zhou Tianhua (CHN)	19.38 m
3.	Claudia Losch (GER)	18.83 m
4.	Kathrin Neimke (GER)	18.59 m
5.	Svetla Mitkova (BUL)	18.54 m
6.	Krystyna Danilczyk-Zabawska (POL)	18.15 m
7.	Connie Price-Smith (USA)	18.09 m
8.	Judy Oakes (GBR)	17.81 m
9.	Asta Hovi-Ovaska (FIN)	17.15 m
10.	Margarita Ramos (ESP)	15.89 m
11.	Hanane Khaled (EGY)	14.76 m
12.	Iammogapi Launa (PNG)	12.56 m

RANK	GROUP B	DISTANCE
1.	Stephanie Storp (GER)	19.52 m
2.	Huang Zhihong (CHN)	19.14 m
3.	Marina Antonyuk (URS)	18.80 m
4.	Svetlana Krivelyova (URS)	18.66 m
5.	Belsy Laza (CUB)	18.32 m
6.	Ramona Pagel (USA)	17.99 m
7.	Myrtle Augee (GBR)	17.80 m
8.	Pam Dukes (USA)	17.17 m
9.	Agnese Maffeis (ITA)	16.99 m
10.	Mihaela Oana (ROM)	16.73 m
11.	Elisângela Adriano (BRA)	15.93 m
12.	Seng Tea Ai (BRU)	11.49 m

== Final ==
Rank	Athlete	Attempts						Distance	Note
Rank	Athlete	1	2	3	4	5	6	Distance	Note
1st place, gold medalist(s)	Huang Zhihong (CHN)	20.64	20.83	20.51	X	X	20.43	20.83 m	
2nd place, silver medalist(s)	Natalya Lisovskaya (URS)	20.15	X	19.95	X	20.29	X	20.29 m	
3rd place, bronze medalist(s)	Svetlana Krivelyova (URS)	19.88	19.77	20.16	19.31	19.91	19.74	20.16 m	
4	Claudia Losch (GER)	18.97	19.74	X	18.41	19.32	19.44	19.74 m	
5	Zhou Tianhua (CHN)	19.32	19.64	X	19.05	X	X	19.64 m	
6	Stephanie Storp (GER)	19.50	X	17.85	18.88	18.76	X	19.50 m	
7	Marina Antonyuk (URS)	19.12	X	X	X	X	X	19.12 m	
8	Kathrin Neimke (GER)	18.81	18.52	18.39	18.63	18.83	18.63	18.83 m	
9	Belsy Laza (CUB)							18.49 m	
10	Svetla Mitkova (BUL)							18.34 m	
11	Connie Price-Smith (USA)							18.12 m	
12	Krystyna Danilczyk-Zabawska (POL)							17.59 m	

== See also ==
- 1988 Women's Olympic Shot Put (Seoul)
- 1990 Women's European Championships Shot Put (Split)
- 1991 Shot Put Year Ranking
- 1992 Women's Olympic Shot Put (Barcelona)
- 1994 Women's European Championships Shot Put (Helsinki)
