= 1988 European Athletics Indoor Championships – Women's shot put =

The women's shot put event at the 1988 European Athletics Indoor Championships was held on 6 March.

== Results ==
Rank	Name	Nationality	#1	#2	#3	#4	#5	#6	Result	Notes
1st place, gold medalist(s)	Claudia Losch	West Germany	19.79	20.33	20.39	x	19.13	19.76	20.39	
2nd place, silver medalist(s)	Larisa Peleshenko	Soviet Union	19.85	19.74	20.23	x	x	x	20.23	
3rd place, bronze medalist(s)	Kathrin Neimke	East Germany	20.20	x	19.97	x	19.60	19.76	20.20	
4	Svetla Mitkova	Bulgaria	19.01	19.65	x	19.46	20.07	19.76	20.07	
5	Soňa Vašíčková	Czechoslovakia	19.66	19.26	19.73	19.99	x	19.39	19.99	
6	Alena Vitoulová	Czechoslovakia	18.35	x	18.41	x	18.15	x	18.41	
7	Viktória Szélinger-Horváth	Hungary	17.27	17.34	17.85	18.38	17.89	17.91	18.38	
8	Asta Hovi	Finland	17.07	17.40	17.24	17.20	17.38	x	17.40	
9	Margarita Ramos	Spain	15.05	15.24	15.42				15.42	
