= 1985 European Athletics Indoor Championships – Women's shot put =

The women's shot put event at the 1985 European Athletics Indoor Championships was held on 2 March.

== Results ==
Rank	Name	Nationality	#1	#2	#3	#4	#5	#6	Result	Notes
1st place, gold medalist(s)	Helena Fibingerová	Czechoslovakia	19.66	20.84	20.65	20.82	x	x	20.84	
2nd place, silver medalist(s)	Claudia Losch	West Germany	20.11	20.59	x	20.46	x	19.74	20.59	
3rd place, bronze medalist(s)	Heike Hartwig	East Germany	19.30	19.73	19.80	19.82	19.93	x	19.93	
4	Mihaela Loghin	Romania	19.26	19.77	19.82	19.89	19.63	18.99	19.89	
5	Natalya Lisovskaya	Soviet Union	x	18.85	x	x	x	18.60	18.85	
6	Judy Oakes	Great Britain	17.83	x	x	x	17.68	x	17.83	
7	Ursula Stäheli	Switzerland	14.85	15.77	16.15	15.80	15.79	x	16.15	
8	Simone Créantor	France	16.02	16.13	x	x	16.10	x	16.13	
