= Athletics at the 1983 Summer Universiade – Women's shot put =

The women's shot put event at the 1983 Summer Universiade was held at the Commonwealth Stadium in Edmonton, Canada on 9 and 10 July 1983.

== Medalists ==
Gold	Silver	Bronze
Natalya Lisovskaya; Soviet Union	Claudia Losch; West Germany	Natalya Akhrimenko; Soviet Union

== Results ==
=== Qualification ===
Rank	Group	Athlete	Nationality	Result	Notes
1	?	Natalya Lisovskaya	Soviet Union	18.73	q
2	?	Claudia Losch	West Germany	17.41	q
3	?	Natalya Akhrimenko	Soviet Union	16.66	q
4	?	Marcelina Rodríguez	Cuba	16.06	q
5	?	Florenta Crăciunescu	Romania	16.01	q
6	?	Bonnie Dasse	United States	15.86	q
7	?	Shen Lijuan	China	15.56	q
8	?	Rosemarie Hauch	Canada	15.40	q
9	?	Regina Cavanaugh	United States	15.40	q
10	?	Snezhana Vasileva	Bulgaria	13.64	q
11	?	Vijaya Datta	India	12.15	q
12	?	Sonia Smith	Bermuda	11.45	q
13	?	Margaret Nasikenda	Uganda	9.96	
14	?	Carole Dagher	Lebanon	9.84	
15	?	Mercedes Centeno	Guatemala	9.79	

=== Final ===
Rank	Athlete	Nationality	Result	Notes
1st place, gold medalist(s)	Natalya Lisovskaya	Soviet Union	20.46	
2nd place, silver medalist(s)	Claudia Losch	West Germany	18.81	
3rd place, bronze medalist(s)	Natalya Akhrimenko	Soviet Union	18.67	
4	Marcelina Rodríguez	Cuba	17.44	
5	Shen Lijuan	China	16.76	
6	Florenta Crăciunescu	Romania	15.81	
7	Rosemarie Hauch	Canada	15.53	
8	Bonnie Dasse	United States	15.32	
9	Regina Cavanaugh	United States	14.95	
10	Snezhana Vasileva	Bulgaria	14.32	
11	Vijaya Datta	India	12.72	
12	Sonia Smith	Bermuda	12.16	
