= Athletics at the 1985 Summer Universiade – Women's shot put =

The women's shot put event at the 1985 Summer Universiade was held at the Kobe Universiade Memorial Stadium in Kobe on 29 August 1985.

The winning margin was 2.68 metres which as of 2024 remains the only time the women's shot put was won by more than 2.2 metres at these games.

== Results ==
Rank	Athlete	Nationality	Result	Notes
1st place, gold medalist(s)	Natalya Lisovskaya	Soviet Union	20.47	
2nd place, silver medalist(s)	Yang Yanqin	China	17.79	
3rd place, bronze medalist(s)	Ramona Pagel	United States	17.46	
4	Valentina Fedyushina	Soviet Union	17.42	
5	Simona Andrușca	Romania	17.17	
6	Maria Kripli	Hungary	16.99	
7	Marcelina Rodríguez	Cuba	16.80	
8	Sui Xinmei	China	16.06	
9	Gabriela Hanuláková	Czechoslovakia	15.83	
10	Regine Cavanaugh	United States	15.47	
11	Concetta Milanese	Italy	15.44	
12	Rie Ogata	Japan	13.96	
