= Myrtle Augee =

English shot putter (born 1965)

Myrtle Augee MBE
Personal information
- Nationality: British (English)
- Born: 4 February 1965 (age 61) Greenwich, Greater London, England
- Height: 171 cm (5 ft 7 in)
- Weight: 91 kg (201 lb)

Sport
- Sport: Athletics
- Club: Cambridge Harriers; Bromley Ladies
Medal record
Representing England
Women's athletics
Commonwealth Games
Gold medal – first place	1990 Auckland	Shot put
Silver medal – second place	1994 Victoria	Shot put
Silver medal – second place	1998 Kuala Lumpur	Shot put
Bronze medal – third place	1986 Edinburgh	Shot put
Representing Great Britain
Women's weightlifting
World Championships
Bronze medal – third place	1994 Istanbul	+83 kg
Women's powerlifting
IPF World Championships
Gold medal – first place	1988 Brussels	+90 kg

Myrtle Sharon Mary Augee (born 4 February 1965) is a female English retired shot putter who competed at two Olympic Games. Augee was appointed a Member of the Order of the British Empire (MBE) in the 2009 Birthday Honours.

== Biography ==
Augee represented Great Britain in the 1988 Summer Olympics and 1992 Summer Olympics.

She competed at four Commonwealth Games and won a medal on all four occasions. Representing England in 1986 she won a bronze medal, at the 1986 Commonwealth Games in Edinburgh, Scotland. Four years later she represented England and won a gold medal, at the 1990 Commonwealth Games in Auckland, New Zealand. This was followed by a silver medal, at the 1994 Commonwealth Games in Victoria, British Columbia, Canada. The final appearance was when she represented England and won another silver, at the 1998 Commonwealth Games in Kuala Lumpur, Malaysia.

Augee was a five-times WAAA Championships/AAA Championships champion winning the British shot put title in 1989, 1992, 1993, 1999 and 2002.

Her personal best put was 19.03 metres, achieved in June 1990 in Cardiff, placing her second on the British outdoor list, behind Judy Oakes.

She was also a World Champion in powerlifting, and a World Championship medalist in weightlifting. She was the last British lifter to win an overall weightlifting medal until Sarah Davies won silver in 2021.

Augee now works as a custodial manager in a prison.

== Achievements in athletics ==
Year	Competition	Venue	Position	Notes
Representing Great Britain and England
1986	European Indoor Championships	Madrid, Spain	9th	17.24 m
1986	Commonwealth Games	Edinburgh, United Kingdom	3rd	17.52 m
1986	European Championships	Stuttgart, West Germany	17th	16.37 m
1987	European Indoor Championships	Liévin, France	7th	17.67 m
1987	World Indoor Championships	Indianapolis, United States	10th	17.85 m
1988	Olympic Games	Seoul, South Korea	17th (q)	17.31 m
1989	European Indoor Championships	The Hague, Netherlands	7th	17.17 m
1990	Commonwealth Games	Auckland, New Zealand	1st	18.48 m
1990	European Championships	Split, Yugoslavia	9th	17.77 m
1991	World Championships	Tokyo, Japan	15th (q)	17.80 m
1992	Olympic Games	Barcelona, Spain	14th (q)	16.53 m
1993	World Championships	Stuttgart, Germany	23rd (q)	16.06 m
1994	European Championships	Helsinki, Finland	14th (q)	16.77 m
1994	Commonwealth Games	Victoria, Canada	2nd	17.64 m
1998	Commonwealth Games	Kuala Lumpur, Malaysia	2nd	17.16 m
2002	Commonwealth Games	Manchester, United Kingdom	5th	16.05 m
