= Athletics at the 1992 Summer Olympics – Women's shot put =

Women's shot put at the Games of the XXV Olympiad
- Venues: Estadi Olínpic de Montjuïc
- Dates: 3 August 1992 (qualifications); 5 August 1992 (finals)
- Competitors: 18 from 11 nations
- Winning distance: 21.06

Medalists
1st place, gold medalist(s)		Svetlana Krivelyova; Unified Team
2nd place, silver medalist(s)		Huang Zhihong; China
3rd place, bronze medalist(s)		Kathrin Neimke; Germany

These are the official results of the women's shot put event at the 1992 Summer Olympics, held on 5 August 1992, at the Olympic Stadium in Barcelona, Spain. There were a total number of 18 participating athletes. The top 12 and ties and all those reaching 18.50 metres advanced to the final.

== Medalists ==
Gold	Svetlana Krivelyova; Unified Team
Silver	Huang Zhihong; China
Bronze	Kathrin Neimke; Germany

== Abbreviations ==
Q	automatic qualification
q	qualification by rank
DNS	did not start
NM	no mark
OR	olympic record
WR	world record
AR	area record
NR	national record
PB	personal best
SB	season best

== Records ==
Standing records prior to the 1992 Summer Olympics
World Record	Natalya Lisovskaya (URS)	22.63 m	7 July 1987	Moscow, Soviet Union
Olympic Record	Ilona Slupianek (GDR)	22.41 m	24 July 1980	Moscow, Soviet Union

== Qualification ==
=== Group A ===
Rank	Overall	Athlete	Attempts			Distance	Note
Rank	Overall	Athlete	1	2	3	Distance	Note
1	2	Natalya Lisovskaya (EUN)	19.58	—	—	19.58 m	
2	3	Svetla Mitkova (BUL)	19.21	—	—	19.21 m	
3	7	Zhou Tianhua (CHN)	17.98	18.63	—	18.63 m	
4	8	Stephanie Storp (GER)	18.49	18.58	—	18.58 m	
5	11	Ramona Pagel (USA)	16.53	18.02	17.89	18.02 m	
6	12	Vita Pavlysh (EUN)	X	X	17.39	17.39 m	
7	14	Myrtle Augee (GBR)	X	15.92	16.53	16.53 m	
8	15	Pam Dukes (USA)	X	16.46	15.46	16.46 m	
9	16	Georgette Reed (CAN)	15.14	15.15	15.33	15.33 m	

=== Group B ===
Rank	Overall	Athlete	Attempts			Distance	Note
Rank	Overall	Athlete	1	2	3	Distance	Note
1	1	Svetlana Krivelyova (EUN)	19.98	—	—	19.98 m	
2	4	Kathrin Neimke (GER)	19.13	—	—	19.13 m	
3	5	Huang Zhihong (CHN)	18.93	—	—	18.93 m	
4	6	Belsy Laza (CUB)	18.33	18.36	18.72	18.72 m	
5	9	Krystyna Danilczyk-Zabawska (POL)	17.51	18.04	18.30	18.30 m	
6	10	Zhen Wenhua (CHN)	18.07	X	18.17	18.17 m	
7	13	Margarita Ramos (ESP)	X	16.82	16.64	16.82 m	
8	17	Elli Evangelidou (CYP)	14.42	14.38	14.69	14.69 m	
—	—	Bonnie Dasse (USA)				16.68 m	DSQ

== Final ==
Rank	Athlete	Attempts						Distance	Note
Rank	Athlete	1	2	3	4	5	6	Distance	Note
1st place, gold medalist(s)	Svetlana Krivelyova (EUN)	20.34	20.09	X	19.99	20.89	21.06	21.06 m	
2nd place, silver medalist(s)	Huang Zhihong (CHN)	20.25	20.19	20.47	X	20.11	20.44	20.47 m	
3rd place, bronze medalist(s)	Kathrin Neimke (GER)	19.61	18.56	19.56	19.22	X	19.78	19.78 m	
4	Belsy Laza (CUB)	18.78	19.70	X	X	18.69	18.75	19.70 m	
5	Zhou Tianhua (CHN)	19.11	18.66	18.64	19.26	18.34	18.57	19.26 m	
6	Svetla Mitkova (BUL)	19.23	X	X	19.09	19.21	19.19	19.23 m	
7	Stephanie Storp (GER)	17.58	19.10	19.08	X	18.96	18.43	19.10 m	
8	Vita Pavlysh (EUN)	18.69	X	X	X	18.61	X	18.69 m	
9	Natalya Lisovskaya (EUN)	18.60	X	X				18.60 m	
10	Krystyna Danilczyk-Zabawska (POL)	17.61	17.89	18.29				18.29 m	
11	Ramona Pagel (USA)	18.24	18.04	17.21				18.24 m	
12	Zhen Wenhua (CHN)	17.56	17.81	X				17.81 m	

== See also ==
- 1988 Women's Olympic Shot Put (Seoul)
- 1990 Women's European Championships Shot Put (Split)
- 1993 Women's World Championships Shot Put (Stuttgart)
- 1994 Women's European Championships Shot Put (Helsinki)
