= Choi Mi-seon =

Choi Mi-seon or Choe Mi-son (최미선) may refer to:

- Choi Mi-seon (athlete) (born 1968), South Korean shot putter
- Choi Mi-seon (gymnast) (born 1980), South Korean gymnast
- Choi Mi-sun (born 1996), South Korean archer
