= Svetla Mitkova-Sınırtaş =

Bulgarian athletics competitor

Medal record

Women's athletics

Representing Bulgaria

European Championships
Bronze medal – third place	1994 Helsinki	Shot put

Svetla Ivanova Mitkova-Sınırtaş (Bulgarian: Светла Иванова Миткова-Sınırtaş; born June 17, 1964, in Medovo, Bulgaria) is a retired athlete who competed in shot put and discus throw. She represented her home country Bulgaria up to 1999, when she gained a Turkish citizenship by marriage. She competed in every World Championship from the inaugural 1983 edition to 1999, the highlight being a bronze medal in 1995. Her personal best results, 20.91 in shot put and 69.72 in discus, were both set in Sofia in 1987.

== Achievements ==
=== Discus throw ===
Year	Competition	Venue	Position	Notes
Representing Bulgaria
1981	European Junior Championships	Utrecht, Netherlands	2nd	55.60 m
1983	World Championships	Helsinki, Finland	10th	62.06 m
1986	European Championships	Stuttgart, West Germany	5th	63.98 m
1987	World Championships	Rome, Italy	5th	66.58 m
1988	Olympic Games	Seoul, South Korea	4th	69.14 m
1994	European Championships	Helsinki, Finland	18th (q)	56.04 m

=== Shot put ===
Year	Competition	Venue	Position	Notes
Representing Bulgaria
1986	European Championships	Stuttgart, West Germany	12th	18.35 m
1987	World Championships	Rome, Italy	9th	19.37 m
1988	Olympic Games	Seoul, South Korea	10th	19.09 m
1991	World Championships	Tokyo, Japan	10th	18.34 m
1992	European Indoor Championships	Genoa, Italy	2nd	20.06 m
1992	Olympic Games	Barcelona, Spain	6th	19.23 m
1993	World Championships	Stuttgart, Germany	10th	18.91 m
1994	European Indoor Championships	Paris, France	3rd	19.09 m
1994	European Championships	Helsinki, Finland	3rd	19.49 m
1995	World Championships	Gothenburg, Sweden	3rd	19.56 m
1996	Olympic Games	Atlanta, United States	18th (q)	17.48 m
1997	World Championships	Athens, Greece	9th	17.75 m
Representing Turkey
1999	World Championships	Seville, Spain	24th (q)	16.40 m

- Results with a (q), indicate overall position in qualifying round.
