= Athletics at the 1982 Commonwealth Games – Women's discus throw =

Women's discus throw at the Commonwealth Games

The women's discus throw event at the 1982 Commonwealth Games was held on 4 October at the QE II Stadium in Brisbane, Australia.

== Results ==
Rank	Name	Nationality	Result	Notes
1st place, gold medalist(s)	Meg Ritchie	Scotland	62.78	GR
2nd place, silver medalist(s)	Gael Martin	Australia	58.64	
3rd place, bronze medalist(s)	Lynda Whiteley	England	54.78	
4	Carmen Ionesco	Canada	54.52	
5	Mariette Van Heerden	Zimbabwe	53.42	
6	Venissa Head	Wales	50.64	
7	Lesley Bryant	England	50.22	
8	Janette Picton	England	47.80	
9	Mereoni Vibose	Fiji	41.36	
10	Helen Alyek	Uganda	40.16	
11	Herina Malit	Kenya	37.88	
12	Christine Béchard	Mauritius	37.74	
