= 1990 European Athletics Championships – Women's shot put =

Women's shot put at the European Athletics Championships

These are the official results of the Women's shot put event at the 1990 European Championships in Split, Yugoslavia, held at Stadion Poljud on 27 August 1990. There were a total number of thirteen participating athletes, and no qualification.

== Medalists ==
Gold	Astrid Kumbernuß; East Germany
Silver	Natalya Lisovskaya; Soviet Union
Bronze	Kathrin Neimke; East Germany

== Final ==
Rank	Final	Distance
	Astrid Kumbernuss (GDR)	20.38 m
	Natalya Lisovskaya (URS)	20.06 m
	Kathrin Neimke (GDR)	19.96 m
4.	Claudia Losch (FRG)	19.92 m
5.	Iris Plotzitzka (FRG)	19.51 m
6.	Heike Hartwig (GDR)	18.90 m
7.	Stephanie Storp (FRG)	18.88 m
8.	Marina Antonyuk (URS)	18.82 m
9.	Myrtle Augee (GBR)	17.77 m
10.	Agnese Maffeis (ITA)	16.58 m
11.	Margarita Ramos (ESP)	16.23 m
12.	Sevgi Sen (TUR)	14.45 m
13.	Teresa Machado (POR)	14.34 m

== Participation ==
According to an unofficial count, 13 athletes from 8 countries participated in the event.

- East Germany (3)
- Italy (1)
- Portugal (1)
- Soviet Union (2)
- Spain (1)
- Turkey (1)
- United Kingdom (1)
- West Germany (3)

== See also ==
- 1988 Women's Olympic Shot Put (Seoul)
- 1990 Shot Put Year Ranking
- 1991 Women's World Championships Shot Put (Tokyo)
- 1992 Women's Olympic Shot Put (Barcelona)
- 1994 Women's European Championships Shot Put (Helsinki)
