= 1990 World Junior Championships in Athletics – Women's shot put =

The women's shot put event at the 1990 World Junior Championships in Athletics was held in Plovdiv, Bulgaria, at Deveti Septemvri Stadium on 8 and 9 August.

== Medalists ==
Gold	Qiu Qiaoping; China
Silver	Li Xiaoyun; China
Bronze	Heike Hopfer; East Germany

== Results ==
=== Final ===
9 August

Rank	Name	Nationality	Attempts						Result	Notes
Rank	Name	Nationality	1	2	3	4	5	6	Result	Notes
1st place, gold medalist(s)	Qiu Qiaoping	China	17.17	17.43	17.74	18.05	18.20	17.58	18.20	
2nd place, silver medalist(s)	Li Xiaoyun	China	17.13	x	17.66	17.74	x	17.74	17.74	
3rd place, bronze medalist(s)	Heike Hopfer	East Germany	15.44	17.27	17.23	17.25	x	x	17.27	
4	Ilona Gersdorff	East Germany	x	16.31	16.61	x	16.79	16.64	16.79	
5	Anna Shilofest	Soviet Union	x	16.66	x	16.47	x	x	16.66	
6	Yekaterina Shishenko	Soviet Union	15.00	15.42	15.47	16.05	15.62	15.66	16.05	
7	Marika Tuliniemi	Finland	14.87	x	15.24	15.38	15.06	15.09	15.38	
8	Päivi Rikala	Finland	14.87	15.26	15.25	15.07	15.26	15.24	15.26	
9	Alexandra Amaro	Brazil	15.12	14.55	14.14				15.12	
10	Elisângela Adriano	Brazil	15.03	14.95	x				15.03	
11	Nicole Carkeek	Australia	14.10	15.01	x				15.01	
12	Stevanie Wadsworth	United States	14.57	14.97	14.37				14.97	
13	Galabina Koleva	Bulgaria	x	14.15	14.97				14.97	

=== Qualifications ===
8 Aug

==== Group A ====
Rank	Name	Nationality	Attempts			Result	Notes
Rank	Name	Nationality	1	2	3	Result	Notes
1	Li Xiaoyun	China	16.66	-	-	16.66	Q
2	Ilona Gersdorff	East Germany	16.47	-	-	16.47	Q
3	Qiu Qiaoping	China	16.00	-	-	16.00	Q
4	Heike Hopfer	East Germany	15.73	-	-	15.73	Q
5	Stevanie Wadsworth	United States	15.62	-	-	15.62	Q
6	Yekaterina Shishenko	Soviet Union	15.46	-	-	15.46	Q
7	Marika Tuliniemi	Finland	14.87	15.38	-	15.38	Q
8	Galabina Koleva	Bulgaria	15.29	-	-	15.29	Q
9	Päivi Rikala	Finland	15.27	-	-	15.27	Q
10	Alexandra Amaro	Brazil	14.69	14.47	15.16	15.16	Q
11	Elisângela Adriano	Brazil	14.71	15.14	-	15.14	Q
12	Anna Shilofest	Soviet Union	15.09	-	-	15.09	Q
13	Nicole Carkeek	Australia	15.01	-	-	15.01	Q
14	Dawn Dumble	United States	14.03	x	14.78	14.78	
15	Eva Cernanová	Czechoslovakia	13.87	14.34	14.77	14.77	
16	Linda-Marie Mårtensson	Sweden	14.64	14.31	14.64	14.64	
17	Daniela Grigorova	Bulgaria	14.05	13.19	x	14.05	
18	Sadith Fretes	Paraguay	10.83	10.80	10.80	10.83	

== Participation ==
According to an unofficial count, 18 athletes from 11 countries participated in the event.

- Australia (1)
- Brazil (2)
- Bulgaria (2)
- China (2)
- Czechoslovakia (1)
- East Germany (2)
- Finland (2)
- Paraguay (1)
- Soviet Union (2)
- Sweden (1)
- United States (2)
