= Athletics at the 1986 Commonwealth Games – Women's shot put =

Women's shot put at the Commonwealth Games

The women's shot put event at the 1986 Commonwealth Games was held on 27 July at the Meadowbank Stadium in Edinburgh.

== Results ==
Rank	Name	Nationality	Result	Notes
1st place, gold medalist(s)	Gael Martin	Australia	19.00	
2nd place, silver medalist(s)	Judy Oakes	England	18.75	
3rd place, bronze medalist(s)	Myrtle Augee	England	17.52	
4	Melody Torcolacci	Canada	16.76	
5	Yvonne Hanson-Nortey	England	16.52	
6	Astra Etienne	Australia	16.33	
7	Rosemary Hauch	Canada	15.29	
8	Jacqueline McKernan	Northern Ireland	11.77	
