= Zhen Wenhua =

Chinese shot putter

Zhen Wenhua (simplified Chinese: 甄文华; traditional Chinese: 甄文華; pinyin: Zhēn Wénhuá; born March 8, 1967) is a former female shot put athlete from China. She competed at the 1992 Summer Olympics in Barcelona, Spain, finishing in twelfth place (17.81 metres) in the overall-rankings.

== International competitions ==
Representing China
Year	Competition	Venue	Position	Event	Notes
1992	Olympic Games	Barcelona, Spain	12th	Shot put	17.81 m
