= Mariette Van Heerden =

Zimbabwean athlete

Personal information
- Nationality: Zimbabwean
- Born: 22 November 1952 (age 73) Southern Rhodesia
- Height: 187 cm (6 ft 2 in)
- Weight: 86 kg (190 lb)

Sport
- Sport: Athletics
- Event: shot put / discus
Medal record
Women's athletics
Representing Zimbabwe
African Championships
Silver medal – second place	1985 Cairo	Discus throw

Margaritha Constantia "Mariette" Van Heerden (born 22 November 1952) is a Zimbabwean former discus thrower and shot puter.

== Biography ==
Van Heerden was born in Southern Rhodesia but grew up in South Africa and was the holder of South African records in shot put and discus throw as well as a multiple South African champion in both these events (1980 and 1981). She was awarded Springbok colours during the years of the international sports boycott of South Africa.

Van Heerden finished second behind Angela Littlewood in the shot put and second behind Meg Ritchie in the discus throw event at the British 1981 WAAA Championships.

Van Heerden competed in the discus at the 1984 Summer Olympics, representing Zimbabwe. She also represented Zimbabwe in the discus at the 1982 Commonwealth Games, 1983 World Championships and 1985 African Championships in Athletics. Van Heerden also competed in the shot put at the 1982 Commonwealth Games.

Van Heerden is still the Zimbabwean record holder in women's shot put (15.58 metres, set on 20 January 1974) and women's discus (55.70 metres, set on 25 March 1984).

Van Heerden moved back to South Africa after 1987 and is the mother of South African swimmer Katheryn Meaklim.
