= 1979 European Athletics Indoor Championships – Women's shot put =

The women's shot put event at the 1979 European Athletics Indoor Championships was held on 25 February in Vienna.

There were only three athletes contesting the title which raised suspicions that this may be due to the new, more advanced drug tests that were announced before the competition. Third place finisher, Judy Oakes of Great Britain, reportedly did not show up to receive her bronze medal as she deemed herself unworthy having won it in such circumstances.

== Results ==
Rank	Name	Nationality	Result	Notes
1st place, gold medalist(s)	Ilona Slupianek	East Germany	21.01	
2nd place, silver medalist(s)	Marianne Adam	East Germany	20.11	
3rd place, bronze medalist(s)	Judy Oakes	Great Britain	15.66	
