= Athletics at the 1998 Commonwealth Games – Women's shot put =

Women's shot put at the Commonwealth Games

The women's shot put event at the 1998 Commonwealth Games was held on 18 September in Kuala Lumpur.

== Results ==
Rank	Name	Nationality	#1	#2	#3	#4	#5	#6	Result	Notes
1st place, gold medalist(s)	Judy Oakes	England	18.50	18.23	18.83	18.40	18.11	18.49	18.83	SB
2nd place, silver medalist(s)	Myrtle Augee	England	16.32	17.10	16.66	16.77	17.07	17.16	17.16	
3rd place, bronze medalist(s)	Johanna Abrahamse	South Africa							16.52	
4	Beatrice Faumuina	New Zealand							16.41	
5	Tania Lutton-Senior	New Zealand							16.03	
6	Helen Toussis	Australia							15.65	
7	Maggie Lynes	England							15.18	
8	Natalia Brown	Jamaica							12.45	
