= Athletics at the 1979 Summer Universiade – Women's shot put =

The women's shot put event at the 1979 Summer Universiade was held at the Estadio Olimpico Universitario in Mexico City on 12 September 1979.

As incredible as it sounds, the winning distance of 19.98 metres was the winning distance two years earlier, and the silver medal-winning distance of 19.56 metres was the silver-medal winning distance two years earlier as well.

== Results ==
Rank	Athlete	Nationality	Result	Notes
1st place, gold medalist(s)	Ilona Slupianek	East Germany	19.98	
2nd place, silver medalist(s)	Helma Knorscheidt	East Germany	19.56	
3rd place, bronze medalist(s)	Mihaela Loghin	Romania	19.41	
4	Ivanka Petrova	Bulgaria	19.13	
5	Verzhiniya Veselinova	Bulgaria	18.87	
6	Nunu Abashydze	Soviet Union	18.77	
7	Lu Cheng	China	16.30	
8	Marcelina Rodríguez	Cuba	15.85	
9	Kathy Devine	United States	14.65	
10	Ann Turbyne	United States	14.17	
10	Marie-Lourdes Samba-Appadoo	Mauritius	9.42	
