= Zhou Tianhua =

Chinese shot putter

Personal information
- Born: April 10, 1966 (age 60) Jiangsu, China

Sport
- Sport: Track and field
Medal record
Representing China
Summer Universiade
Gold medal – first place	1993 Buffalo	Shot put
Bronze medal – third place	1989 Duisburg	Shot put
Bronze medal – third place	1991 Sheffield	Shot put

Zhou Tianhua (simplified Chinese: 周天华; traditional Chinese: 週天華; pinyin: Zhōu Tiānhuá; born April 10, 1966) is a former female shot put athlete from China. She competed at the 1992 Summer Olympics in Barcelona, Spain, finishing in fifth place in the overall-rankings.

== Doping ==
In 1993 Zhou tested positive for a prohibited substance and was banned from sports by the Chinese Olympic Anti-doping committee.

== Achievements ==
Year	Competition	Venue	Position	Notes
Representing China
1991	World Championships	Tokyo, Japan	5th	19.64 m
1992	Olympic Games	Barcelona, Spain	5th	19.26 m
