= Margarita Ramos =

Spanish shot putter

Personal information
- Born: 26 June 1966 (age 60) Cea, Spain
- Height: 1.78 m (5 ft 10 in)
- Weight: 80 kg (176 lb) (1992)

Sport
- Sport: Track and field
- Event: Shot put
Medal record
Representing Spain
Mediterranean Games
Gold medal – first place	1991 Athens	Shot put
Bronze medal – third place	1993 Narbonne	Shot put
Bronze medal – third place	1997 Bari	Shot put

Margarita Ramos Villar (born 26 June 1966) is a retired Spanish athlete who specialised in the shot put. She represented her country at the 1992 Summer Olympics as well as one indoor and one outdoor World Championships.

Her personal bests in the event are 17.93 metres outdoors (Alcalá de Henares 1997) and 17.74 metres indoors (Espinho 1998).

== Competition record ==
Year	Competition	Venue	Position	Event	Notes
Representing Spain
1987	European Indoor Championships	Budapest, Hungary	9th	Shot put	14.54 m
1987	Mediterranean Games	Latakia, Syria	4th	Shot put	14.14 m
1988	European Indoor Championships	Budapest, Hungary	9th	Shot put	15.42 m
1988	Ibero-American Championships	Mexico City, Mexico	3rd	Shot put	15.51 m
1988	Ibero-American Championships	Mexico City, Mexico	6th	Discus throw	44.94 m
1989	European Indoor Championships	The Hague, Netherlands	9th	Shot put	16.59 m
1989	Universiade	Duisburg, West Germany	9th	Shot put	15.59 m
1989	World Cup	Barcelona, Spain	7th	Shot put	15.61 m
1990	European Championships	Split, Yugoslavia	11th	Shot put	16.23 m
1990	Ibero-American Championships	Manaus, Brazil	2nd	Shot put	16.26 m
1990	Ibero-American Championships	Manaus, Brazil	3rd	Discus throw	49.74 m
1991	Mediterranean Games	Athens, Greece	1st	Shot put	17.71 m
1991	World Championships	Tokyo, Japan	21st (q)	Shot put	15.89 m
1992	Ibero-American Championships	Seville, Spain	3rd	Shot put	16.69 m
1992	Olympic Games	Barcelona, Spain	13th (q)	Shot put	16.82 m
1993	Mediterranean Games	Narbonne, France	3rd	Shot put	16.86 m
1994	Ibero-American Championships	Mar del Plata, Argentina	3rd	Shot put	16.39 m
1996	European Indoor Championships	Stockholm, Sweden	8th	Shot put	16.53 m
1997	World Indoor Championships	Paris, France	13th (q)	Shot put	16.88 m
1997	Mediterranean Games	Bari, Italy	3rd	Shot put	17.42 m
1998	European Indoor Championships	Valencia, Spain	13th	Shot put	16.63 m
1998	Ibero-American Championships	Lisbon, Portugal	2nd	Shot put	17.47 m
1998	European Championships	Budapest, Hungary	18th (q)	Shot put	16.41 m
