= Marika Tuliniemi =

Finnish shot putter (born 1974)

Marika Tuliniemi (born 19 July 1974) is a retired Finnish shot putter.

She finished seventh at the 1990 World Junior Championships, ninth at the 1992 World Junior Championships, won the 1993 European Junior Championships and finished eleventh at the 1994 European Championships. She also competed at the 1993 World Championships without reaching the final.

Competing for the SMU Mustangs track and field team, Tuliniemi won the 1999 shot put at the NCAA Division I Indoor Track and Field Championships with a throw of 16.74 meters.

Tuliniemi won the Finnish championships in 1995 and 1997. Her personal best put was 17.93 metres, achieved in July 1993 in San Sebastian.
