= Athletics at the 1982 Commonwealth Games – Women's shot put =

Suryavanshi khatik

Women's shot put at the Commonwealth Games

The women's shot put event at the 1982 Commonwealth Games was held on 5 October at the QE II Stadium in Brisbane, Australia.

== Results ==
Rank	Name	Nationality	Result	Notes
1st place, gold medalist(s)	Judy Oakes	England	17.92	GR
2nd place, silver medalist(s)	Gael Martin	Australia	17.68	
3rd place, bronze medalist(s)	Rose Hauch	Canada	16.71	
4	Bev Francis	Australia	16.40	
5	Angela Littlewood	England	15.97	
6	Carmen Ionesco	Canada	15.80	
7	Meg Ritchie	Scotland	15.63	
8	Mariette Van Heerden	Zimbabwe	14.15	
9	Glenda Hughes	New Zealand	14.13	
10	Elizabeth Olaba	Kenya	12.84	
11	Herina Malit	Kenya	12.59	
12	Marie-Lourdes Allysamba	Mauritius	11.37	
	Venissa Head	Wales	DNS	
