= Athletics at the 1988 Summer Olympics – Women's shot put =

Women's shot put at the Games of the XXIV Olympiad
- Venues: Olympic Stadium
- Dates: September 30, 1988 (qualifications); October 1, 1988 (finals)
- Competitors: 26 from 14 nations
- Winning distance: 22.24

Medalists
1st place, gold medalist(s)		Natalya Lisovskaya; Soviet Union
2nd place, silver medalist(s)		Kathrin Neimke; East Germany
3rd place, bronze medalist(s)		Li Meisu; China

The women's shot put event at the 1988 Summer Olympics in Seoul, South Korea had an entry list of 26 competitors, with two qualifying groups before the final (12) took place on Saturday October 1, 1988.

The winning margin was 1.17 metres which as of June 2024 remains the only time the women's shot put has been won by more than 1.1 metres at the Olympics.

== Medalists ==
Gold	Natalya Lisovskaya; Soviet Union
Silver	Kathrin Neimke; East Germany
Bronze	Li Meisu; China

== Abbreviations ==
- All results shown are in metres

Q	automatic qualification
q	qualification by rank
DNS	did not start
NM	no mark
OR	olympic record
WR	world record
AR	area record
NR	national record
PB	personal best
SB	season best

== Records ==
Standing records prior to the 1988 Summer Olympics
World Record	Natalya Lisovskaya (URS)	22.63 m	July 7, 1987	Moscow, Soviet Union
Olympic Record	Ilona Slupianek (GDR)	22.41 m	July 24, 1980	Moscow, Soviet Union

== Qualification ==
=== Group A ===
Rank	Overall	Athlete	Attempts			Distance	Note
Rank	Overall	Athlete	1	2	3	Distance	Note
1	1	Claudia Losch (FRG)	18.82	20.39	—	20.39 m	
2	2	Li Meisu (CHN)	20.30	—	—	20.30 m	
3	3	Kathrin Neimke (GDR)	20.18	—	—	20.18 m	
4	4	Heike Hartwig (GDR)	19.22	20.06	—	20.06 m	
5	7	Zdeňka Šilhavá (TCH)	19.74	—	—	19.74 m	
6	9	Cong Yuzhen (CHN)	19.55	—	—	19.56 m	
7	10	Svetla Mitkova (BUL)	18.80	19.53	—	19.53 m	
8	11	Bonnie Dasse (USA)	19.29	19.45	18.94	19.45 m	
9	13	Valentina Fedjuschina (URS)	16.93	19.05	19.06	19.06 m	
10	18	Connie Price (USA)	15.61	X	17.09	17.09 m	
11	20	Yvonne Hanson-Nortey (GBR)	15.13	14.86	X	15.13 m	
12	21	Maria Isabel Urrutia (COL)	15.13	14.85	14.42	15.13 m	
13	25	Siololovau Ikavuka (TGA)	12.31	X	11.18	12.31 m	

=== Group B ===
Rank	Overall	Athlete	Attempts			Distance	Note
Rank	Overall	Athlete	1	2	3	Distance	Note
1	5	Ines Müller (GDR)	19.79	—	—	19.79 m	
2	6	Natalya Lisovskaya (URS)	19.78	—	—	19.78 m	
3	8	Huang Zhihong (CHN)	19.71	—	—	19.71 m	
4	12	Natalya Akhrimenko (URS)	19.26	19.40	X	19.40 m	
5	14	Iris Plotzitzka (FRG)	18.79	19.06	X	19.06 m	
6	15	Ramona Pagel (USA)	18.55	18.45	18.36	18.55 m	
7	16	Judy Oakes (GBR)	17.76	18.34	18.02	18.34 m	
8	17	Myrtle Augee (GBR)	16.85	16.44	17.31	17.31 m	
9	19	Deborah Saint-Phard (HAI)	14.87	15.35	16.02	16.02 m	
10	22	Grace Apiafi (NGR)	15.06	15.05	14.58	15.06 m	
11	23	Choi Mi-seon (KOR)	13.90	13.44	13.97	13.97 m	
12	24	Jeanne-Nicole Ngo Minyemeck (CMR)	11.84	12.73	12.61	12.73 m	
—	—	Sona Vasickova (TCH)	—	—	—	DNS	

== Final ==
Rank	Athlete	Attempts						Distance	Note
Rank	Athlete	1	2	3	4	5	6	Distance	Note
1st place, gold medalist(s)	Natalya Lisovskaya (URS)	21.69	21.49	21.24	21.74	21.11	22.24	22.24 m	
2nd place, silver medalist(s)	Kathrin Neimke (GDR)	19.64	20.07	19.82	20.37	20.72	21.07	21.07 m	
3rd place, bronze medalist(s)	Li Meisu (CHN)	19.99	20.03	20.72	20.49	21.06	20.84	21.06 m	
4	Ines Müller (GDR)	20.37	19.34	X	X	19.55	20.34	20.37 m	
5	Claudia Losch (FRG)	20.08	X	19.40	20.27	X	X	20.27 m	
6	Heike Hartwig (GDR)	19.94	20.20	19.71	20.16	X	19.75	20.20 m	
7	Natalya Akhrimenko (URS)	19.37	19.86	19.18	X	19.60	20.13	20.13 m	
8	Huang Zhihong (CHN)	18.26	19.15	19.82	19.79	19.73	19.56	19.82 m	
9	Cong Yuzhen (CHN)	19.69	X	19.65				19.69 m	
10	Svetla Mitkova (BUL)	18.29	18.79	19.09				19.09 m	
11	Zdeňka Šilhavá (TCH)	16.85	18.86	X				18.86 m	
12	Bonnie Dasse (USA)	17.60	17.59	17.51				17.60 m	

== See also ==
- 1986 Women's European Championships Shot Put (Stuttgart)
- 1987 Women's World Championships Shot Put (Rome)
- 1990 Women's European Championships Shot Put (Split)
- 1991 Women's World Championships Shot Put (Tokyo)
