= Athletics at the 1978 Commonwealth Games – Women's shot put =

Women's shot put at the Commonwealth Games

The women's shot put event at the 1978 Commonwealth Games was held on 8 August at the Commonwealth Stadium in Edmonton, Alberta, Canada.

== Results ==
Rank	Name	Nationality	Result	Notes
1st place, gold medalist(s)	Gael Mulhall	Australia	17.31	
2nd place, silver medalist(s)	Carmen Ionesco	Canada	16.45	
3rd place, bronze medalist(s)	Judy Oakes	England	16.14	
4	Angela Littlewood	England	15.71	
5	Beverley Francis	Australia	15.66	
6	Venissa Head	Wales	15.52	
7	Luigina Torso	Australia	15.09	
8	Meg Ritchie	Scotland	14.99	
9	Lucette Moreau	Canada	14.92	
10	Herina Malit	Kenya	12.04	
11	Branwen Smith	Bermuda	11.80	
