= Marcelina Rodríguez =

Cuban shot putter

Personal information
- Born: 26 April 1960 (age 66)

Sport
- Sport: Athletics
- Event: Shot put
Medal record
Representing Cuba
Central American and Caribbean Games
Gold medal – first place	1986 Santiago	Shot put
Silver medal – second place	1978 Medellin	Shot put

Marcelina Rodríguez (born 26 April 1960) is a retired Cuban athlete who specialised in the shot put. She won multiple medals at regional level.

Her personal best in the event is 18.05 metres set in Hainfeld in 1986.

== International competitions ==
Year	Competition	Venue	Position	Event	Notes
Representing Cuba
1977	Central American and Caribbean Championships	Xalapa, Mexico	2nd	Shot put	13.88
1978	Central American and Caribbean Games	Medellín, Colombia	2nd	Shot put	14.97 m
1978	Central American and Caribbean; Junior Championships (U20)	Xalapa, Mexico	1st	Shot put	13.90 m
1978	Central American and Caribbean; Junior Championships (U20)	Xalapa, Mexico	2nd	Discus throw	39.50 m
1979	Central American and Caribbean Championships	Guadalajara, Mexico	2nd	Shot put	17.80 m
1979	Universiade	Mexico City, Mexico	8th	Shot put	15.85 m
1983	Universiade	Edmonton, Canada	4th	Shot put	17.44 m
1983	Central American and Caribbean Championships	Havana, Cuba	1st	Shot put	17.00 m
1985	Central American and Caribbean Championships	Nassau, Bahamas	1st	Shot put	17.16 m
1985	Universiade	Kobe, Japan	7th	Shot put	16.80 m
1986	Central American and Caribbean Games	Santiago, Dominican Republic	1st	Shot put	17.22 m
1986	Ibero-American Championships	Havana, Cuba	2nd	Shot put	15.72 m
