= Athletics at the 1990 Commonwealth Games – Women's shot put =

Women's shot put at the Commonwealth Games

The women's shot put event at the 1990 Commonwealth Games was held on 29 January at the Mount Smart Stadium in Auckland, New Zealand.

== Results ==
Rank	Name	Nationality	#1	#2	#3	#4	#5	#6	Result	Notes
1st place, gold medalist(s)	Myrtle Augee	England	17.82						18.48	
2nd place, silver medalist(s)	Judy Oakes	England	18.43	18.22	x	18.31	18.38	18.38	18.43	
3rd place, bronze medalist(s)	Yvonne Hanson-Nortey	England	15.69	16.00	x	x	x	?	16.00	
4	Melody Torcolacci	Canada	x	15.49	x	15.42	x	?	15.49	
5	Nicole Carkeek	Australia							15.13	
6	Christine King	New Zealand	13.28	14.36	x	14.40	?	?	14.40	
7	Janice Maxwell	New Zealand	14.09						14.09	
