= 1994 European Athletics Championships – Women's shot put =

Women's shot put at the European Athletics Championships

These are the official results of the Women's shot put event at the 1994 European Championships in Helsinki, Finland. There were a total number of 20 participating athletes, with two qualifying groups and the final held at Helsinki Olympic Stadium on 7 August 1994.

== Medalists ==
Gold	Vita Pavlysh; Ukraine
Silver	Astrid Kumbernuß; Germany
Bronze	Svetla Mitkova; Bulgaria

== Final ==
Rank	Final	Distance
	Viktoriya Pavlysh (UKR)	19.61 m
	Astrid Kumbernuss (GER)	19.49 m
	Svetla Mitkova (BUL)	19.49 m
4.	Stephanie Storp (GER)	19.39 m
5.	Larisa Peleshenko (RUS)	18.94 m
6.	Kathrin Neimke (GER)	18.94 m
7.	Valentina Fedyushina (UKR)	18.91 m
8.	Anna Romanova (RUS)	18.40 m
9.	Krystyna Danilczyk (POL)	17.50 m
10.	Danguolė Urbikienė (LTU)	17.37 m
11.	Marika Tuliniemi (FIN)	16.77 m
12.	Nataša Erjavec (SLO)	16.34 m

== Qualifying round ==
- Held on 7 August 1994

Rank	Group A	Distance
1.	Stephanie Storp (GER)	18.85 m
2.	Larisa Peleshenko (RUS)	18.32 m
3.	Svetla Mitkova (BUL)	18.24 m
4.	Valentina Fedyushina (UKR)	18.04 m
5.	Danguolė Urbikienė (LTU)	17.22 m
6.	Marika Tuliniemi (FIN)	17.05 m
7.	Nataša Erjavec (SLO)	16.98 m
8.	Maggie Lynes (GBR)	16.16 m
9.	Linda-Marie Mårtensson (SWE)	15.90 m
10.	Elvira Urusova (GEO)	15.73 m

Rank	Group B	Distance
1.	Astrid Kumbernuss (GER)	18.41 m
2.	Anna Romanova (RUS)	18.39 m
3.	Viktoriya Pavlysh (UKR)	18.29 m
4.	Kathrin Neimke (GER)	18.08 m
5.	Krystyna Danilczyk (POL)	17.98 m
6.	Karoliina Lundahl (FIN)	16.82 m
7.	Myrtle Augee (GBR)	16.77 m
8.	Corrie de Bruin (NED)	16.66 m
9.	Eha Rünne (EST)	16.66 m
10.	Katarina Sederholm (FIN)	15.72 m

== Participation ==
According to an unofficial count, 20 athletes from 13 countries participated in the event.

- Bulgaria (1)
- Estonia (1)
- Finland (3)
- Georgia (1)
- Germany (3)
- Lithuania (1)
- Netherlands (1)
- Poland (1)
- Russia (2)
- Slovenia (1)
- Sweden (1)
- Ukraine (2)
- United Kingdom (2)

== See also ==
- 1991 Women's World Championships Shot Put (Tokyo)
- 1992 Women's Olympic Shot Put (Barcelona)
- 1993 Women's World Championships Shot Put (Stuttgart)
- 1994 Shot Put Year Ranking
- 1995 Women's World Championships Shot Put (Gothenburg)
- 1996 Women's Olympic Shot Put (Atlanta)
- 1997 Women's World Championships Shot Put (Athens)
