= Ellinor Ljungros =

Swedish long-distance runner

Ellinor Ljungros (born 19 May 1953) is a former female long-distance runner from Sweden, who won the Rotterdam Marathon on 19 April 1986 clocking 2:41:06.

== Achievements ==
- All results regarding marathon, unless stated otherwise

Year	Competition	Venue	Position	Notes
Representing Sweden
1986	Rotterdam Marathon	Rotterdam, Netherlands	1st	2:41:06
