= Medovo =

Medovo Медово
- Selo
- Location within Voronezh Oblast Location within Russia
- Coordinates: 49°44′N 40°42′E
- Country: Russia
- Region: Voronezh Oblast
- District: Bogucharsky District
- Time zone: UTC+3:00

Medovo (Russian: Медово) is a rural locality (a selo) in Medovskoye Rural Settlement, Bogucharsky District, Voronezh Oblast, Russia. The population was 149 as of 2010. There are 4 streets.

== Geography ==
Medovo is located 40 km southeast of Boguchar (the district's administrative centre) by road. Yuzhny is the nearest rural locality.
