= Judy Oakes =

English shot putter

Personal information
- Nationality: British (English)
- Born: 14 February 1958 (age 68) Lewisham, Greater London
- Height: 163 cm (5 ft 4 in)
- Weight: 83 kg (183 lb)

Sport
- Sport: Athletics
- Event: Shot put
- Club: Croydon Harriers
Medal record
Representing England
Women's athletics
Commonwealth Games
Gold medal – first place	1982 Brisbane	Shot put
Gold medal – first place	1994 Victoria	Shot put
Gold medal – first place	1998 Kuala Lumpur	Shot put
Silver medal – second place	1986 Edinburgh	Shot put
Silver medal – second place	1990 Auckland	Shot put
Bronze medal – third place	1978 Edmonton	Shot put
Representing Great Britain
Women's athletics
European Indoor Championships
Bronze medal – third place	1979 Vienna	Shot put
Women's weightlifting
World Championships
Bronze medal – third place	1989 Manchester	82.5 kg
Women's powerlifting
IPF World Championships
Gold medal – first place	1981 Honolulu	75 kg
Gold medal – first place	1982 Birmingham	82.5 kg
Gold medal – first place	1988 Brussels	82.5 kg
Silver medal – second place	1983 Adelaide	82.5 kg
Silver medal – second place	1990 Jonkoping	82.5 kg

Judith Miriam Oakes (born 14 February 1958 in Lewisham, Greater London) is a female retired English shot putter, powerlifter, and weightlifter.

== Athletics career ==
Oakes represented Great Britain in the 1984 Summer Olympics, 1988 Summer Olympics, 1996 Summer Olympics and 2000 Summer Olympics.

Oakes competed in six consecutive Commonwealth Games from 1978 until 1998 and won a medal at every one of them. She represented England and won a bronze medal at the 1978 Commonwealth Games in Edmonton, Alberta, Canada. Four years later she represented England and won a gold medal, at the 1982 Commonwealth Games in Brisbane, Australia. A further four years later she represented England and won a silver medal, at the 1986 Commonwealth Games in Edinburgh, Scotland. The fourth appearance and medal came in 1990 when she represented England and won another silver, at the 1990 Commonwealth Games in Auckland, New Zealand. The fifth and sixth medals were gold medals at the 1994 Commonwealth Games in Victoria and, aged 40, at the 1998 Commonwealth Games in Kuala Lumpur.

Her personal best put was 19.36 metres, achieved in August 1988 in Gateshead. This is still the British record.

Oakes was a British shot put champion in one form or another a remarkable 49 times. She won the main British WAAA Championships title 18 times (in 1979–1980, 1982–1988, 1990-1992, 1994-1998 and 2000).. the UK Athletics Championships title which was also recognised as a national championship, and ran simultaneously, 11 times (1978, 1982, 1984-1989, 1991-1992 and 1997) and the British Indoor Athletics Championships title, also 18 times (1977-1980, 1982. 1984-1988, 1990-1991 and 1995-2000).

== Powerlifting career ==
She was World Champion in Powerlifting three times, and European Champion eight times. Her last British Record (a Squat of 202½kg in the 75 kg bodyweight class set in February 1989) lasted until June 2008, when Marie Thornton squatted 215 kg.

In Weightlifting she was European Champion in 1989 and 1990.

== Awards ==
She was given an OBE (Officer of the Order of the British Empire) in 1999.

== Achievements in athletics ==
Year	Competition	Venue	Position	Notes
Representing Great Britain and England
1978	Commonwealth Games	Edmonton, Canada	3rd	16.14 m
1979	European Indoor Championships	Vienna, Austria	3rd	15.66 m
1982	Commonwealth Games	Brisbane, Australia	1st	17.92 m
1983	World Championships	Helsinki, Finland	12th	17.52 m
1984	Olympic Games	Los Angeles, United States	4th	18.14 m
1985	European Indoor Championships	Piraeus, Greece	6th	17.83 m
1986	Commonwealth Games	Edinburgh, United Kingdom	2nd	18.75 m
1986	European Championships	Stuttgart, West Germany	14th	17.85 m
1987	European Indoor Championships	Liévin, France	6th	18.14 m
1987	World Indoor Championships	Indianapolis, United States	9th	17.85 m
1987	World Championships	Rome, Italy	15th (q)	18.43 m
1988	Olympic Games	Seoul, South Korea	16th (q)	18.34 m
1990	Commonwealth Games	Auckland, New Zealand	2nd	18.43 m
1991	World Championships	Tokyo, Japan	14th (q)	17.81 m
1994	Commonwealth Games	Victoria, Canada	1st	18.16 m
1995	World Indoor Championships	Barcelona, Spain	8th	17.77 m
1995	World Championships	Gothenburg, Sweden	13th (q)	17.87 m
1996	European Indoor Championships	Stockholm, Sweden	4th	18.72 m
1996	Olympic Games	Atlanta, United States	11th	18.34 m
1997	World Indoor Championships	Paris, France	10th	17.51 m
1997	World Championships	Athens, Greece	14th (q)	17.84 m
1998	European Indoor Championships	Valencia, Spain	6th	18.42 m
1998	Goodwill Games	Uniondale, United States	6th	18.12 m
1998	Commonwealth Games	Kuala Lumpur, Malaysia	1st	18.83 m
2000	Olympic Games	Sydney, Australia	13th (q)	17.81 m
