= Natalya Akhrimenko =

Russian shot putter (1955–2025)

Personal information
- Born: 12 May 1955 Novokuybyshevsk, Samara Oblast, Soviet Union
- Died: 10 March 2025 (aged 69) Saint Petersburg, Russia

Sport
- Sport: Track and field
Medal record
Representing Soviet Union
European Championships
| Bronze medal – third place | 1986 Stuttgart | Shot put |
European Indoor Championships
| Gold medal – first place | 1987 Lievin | Shot put |
Summer Universiade
| Bronze medal – third place | 1983 Edmonton | Shot put |

Natalya Akhremenko (Russian: Наталья Ахременко; 12 May 1955 – 10 March 2025) was a track and field shot putter from Russia, best known for competing at the 1980 Summer Olympics in Moscow, USSR. There she ended up in seventh place, just like eight years later in Seoul, South Korea.

== Achievements ==
| Year | Competition | Venue | Position | Notes |
|---|---|---|---|---|
| 1980 | Olympic Games | Moscow, Soviet Union | 7th | 19.74 m |
| 1983 | Universiade | Edmonton, Canada | 3rd | 18.67 m |
| 1986 | Goodwill Games | Moscow, Soviet Union | 2nd | 20.33 m |
| 1986 | European Championships | Stuttgart, Germany | 3rd | 20.68 m |
| 1987 | European Indoor Championships | Liévin, France | 1st | 20.84 m |
| 1987 | World Indoor Championships | Indianapolis, United States | 5th | 19.32 m |
| 1987 | World Championships | Rome, Italy | 5th | 20.68 m |
| 1988 | Olympic Games | Seoul, South Korea | 7th | 20.13 m |
