= Choi Mi-seon (athlete) =

South Korean shot putter

Personal information
- Nationality: South Korean
- Born: 10 October 1968 (age 57)

Sport
- Sport: Athletics
- Event: Shot put
- College team: Pusan National University
Medal record
Women's athletics
Representing South Korea
Asian Championships
Silver medal – second place	1987 Singapore	Shot put

Korean name
- Hangul: 최미선
- Hanja: 崔美仙
- RR: Choe Miseon
- MR: Ch'oe Misŏn

Choi Mi-seon (born 10 October 1968) is a South Korean athlete. She competed in the women's shot put at the 1988 Summer Olympics.
