= Asta Ovaska =

Finnish shot putter

Asta Ovaska, née Hovi (born 29 July 1963) is a retired Finnish shot putter.

She finished fifteenth at the 1986 European Championships and eighth at the 1988 European Indoor Championships. She competed at the 1987 and 1991 World Championships without reaching the final.

Ovaska won the Finnish championships every year from 1983 through 1993. Her personal best put was 18.57 metres, achieved in August 1989 in Stockholm.
