= Huang Zhihong =

Chinese shot putter (born 1965)

Personal information
- Born: May 7, 1965 (age 61) Lanxi, Zhejiang, China

Sport
- Sport: Track and field
Medal record
Representing China
Olympic Games
| Silver medal – second place | 1992 Barcelona | Shot put |
World Championships
| Gold medal – first place | 1991 Tokyo | Shot put |
| Gold medal – first place | 1993 Stuttgart | Shot put |
| Silver medal – second place | 1995 Gothenburg | Shot put |
World Championships
| Silver medal – second place | 1989 Budapest | Shot put |
| Silver medal – second place | 1991 Seville | Shot put |
Asian Games
| Gold medal – first place | 1986 Seoul | Shot put |
| Silver medal – second place | 1990 Beijing | Shot put |
Asian Championships
| Gold medal – first place | 1989 New Delhi | Shot put |
| Gold medal – first place | 1991 Kuala Lumpur | Shot put |
Summer Universiade
| Gold medal – first place | 1989 Duisburg | Shot put |

Huang Zhihong (simplified Chinese: 黄志红; traditional Chinese: 黃志紅; pinyin: Huáng Zhìhóng); born May 7, 1965) is a Chinese former shot put athlete. An Olympic silver medalist and a two-time world champion, she was the first Asian to win a title at the IAAF World Championships in Athletics. Her personal best throw is 21.52, achieved in Beijing 1990.

== Achievements ==
| Year | Competition | Venue | Position | Notes |
Representing China
| 1986 | Asian Games | Seoul, South Korea | 1st | 17.51 m |
| 1987 | World Championships | Rome, Italy | 11th | 19.35 m |
| 1988 | Olympic Games | Seoul, South Korea | 8th | 19.82 m |
| 1989 | World Indoor Championships | Budapest, Hungary | 2nd | 20.25 m |
| 1989 | Universiade | Duisburg, West Germany | 1st | 20.56 m |
| 1989 | Asian Championships | New Delhi, India | 1st | 19.69 m |
| 1989 | World Cup | Barcelona, Spain | 1st | 20.73 m |
| 1990 | Goodwill Games | Seattle, United States | 2nd | 20.50 m |
| 1990 | Asian Games | Beijing, China | 2nd | 20.46 m |
| 1991 | World Indoor Championships | Seville, Spain | 2nd | 20.33 m |
| 1991 | Asian Championships | Kuala Lumpur, Malaysia | 1st | 17.51 m |
| 1991 | World Championships | Tokyo, Japan | 1st | 20.83 m |
| 1992 | Olympic Games | Barcelona, Spain | 2nd | 20.47 m |
| 1993 | World Championships | Stuttgart, Germany | 1st | 20.57 m |
| 1994 | Goodwill Games | Saint Petersburg, Russia | 2nd | 20.08 m |
| 1994 | World Cup | London, United Kingdom | 1st | 19.45 m |
| 1995 | World Championships | Gothenburg, Sweden | 2nd | 20.04 m |
| 1997 | World Indoor Championships | Paris, France | 5th | 18.67 m |
| 1997 | World Championships | Athens, Greece | 4th | 19.15 m |

== See also ==
- China at the World Championships in Athletics
