= Stephanie Storp =

German shot putter

Personal information
- Born: 28 November 1968 (age 57) Braunschweig, West Germany
Medal record
Women's Athletics
Representing Germany
World Championships
Bronze medal – third place	1997 Athens	Shot put
World Indoor Championships
Silver medal – second place	1993 Toronto	Shot put

Stephanie Storp (born 28 November 1968 in Braunschweig, Lower Saxony) is a retired female shot putter from Germany. Her best performance was winning the bronze medal at the 1997 World Championships, with a throw of 19.22 metres. She also won the silver medal at the 1993 World Indoor Championships, and represented her country in the Summer Olympics of 1992 and 1996. She ended her athletics career in 1998, having taken up basketball as a new sport.

== Athletics career ==
As a teenager she won the bronze medal at the 1985 European Junior Championships. Storp represented West Germany, and finished behind two East Germans Bettina Libera and Ilke Wyludda. The next year she won the silver medal at the first edition of the World Junior Championships, again sharing the podium with two East Germans Heike Rohrmann and Ines Wittich. The same year she competed at the 1986 European Championships for seniors, finishing eleventh in the shot put and tenth in the discus throw. She would not compete on top level in discus throw after this.

One year later, still only nineteen years of age, she competed at her first World Championships, which was staged in Rome. She finished tenth with a throw of 19.36 metres. During the indoor season she had finished fifth at the 1987 European Indoor Championships, and in August, a month before the World Championships, she had thrown a personal best of 19.90 metres in Hamburg. At her first World Indoor Championships in 1989 she finished fourth, with 19.63 metres. The same winter she competed at the 1989 European Indoor Championships, which she won with a throw of 20.30 metres. She finished ahead of East German Heike Hartwig and West German Iris Plotzitzka. The result of 20.30 metres would remain her career best throw in an indoor event.

In 1990 she broke the 20-metre barrier on the outdoor field as well, throwing a new personal best of 20.34 metres on 1 July in Wolfsburg, a result that would remain her career best throw. That season she finished sixth at the 1990 European Indoor Championships and seventh at the 1990 European Championships. With a seventh place she actually placed behind five other Germans; three from East Germany (Kumbernuss, Neimke, Hartwig) and two from West Germany (Losch, Plotzitzka). This would be her last competition under the partition of Germany.

In 1991 she finished fourth at the 1991 World Indoor Championships and sixth at the 1991 World Championships. She had thrown 19.52 metres during the qualifying round; in the final she threw 19.50 metres. Her best throw this season was 19.80 metres; this was the third best throw in Europe that season, only behind two athletes from the Soviet Union who had 21.12 and 20.36 metres respectively. In 1992 Storp qualified for her first Olympic Games. She represented the unified Germany together with Kathrin Neimke. In the Olympic competition, Neimke went on to win the bronze medal, while Storp finished seventh with a best throw of 19.10 metres. This was also her best throw for the season.

The next year she made a breakthrough at the senior level as she won her first major international medal. With a throw of 19.37 metres, she won the silver medal at the 1993 World Indoor Championships, only behind 1992 Olympic champion Svetlana Krivelyova. On 23 July in London she threw a season's best of 19.71 metres. She did not manage to repeat this form in the 1993 World Championships final a month later. Having reached the final with a 19.38 metre throw in the qualification round, she only finished eleventh with a mediocre 18.83 metres. The event was staged in Stuttgart in her home country, and once again countryfellow Kathrin Neimke won the bronze medal.

In 1994 it was time for another edition of the European Championships. Storp managed a throw of 19.39 metres, which was enough to secure a fourth place. Both the bronze medalist and the silver medalist, who was her countryfellow Astrid Kumbernuss, threw 19.49 metres. Storp did not compete at the next major event, the 1995 World Indoor Championships. At the 1995 World Championships, she once again underperformed in the final round with a throw of 18.81 metres. This time, it was enough for an eighth place, tied with seventh but losing on countback (measuring the second best throw in the competition). Astrid Kumbernuss won the event, with Kathrin Neimke in fourth place. Storp's season's best was only 18.95, achieved in July in London. 1996 was an Olympic year, and Storp was selected for her second Olympic Games. With 19.06 metres she finished sixth in the Olympic shot put final, one place ahead of Kathrin Neimke while Kumbernuss again won the event.

In 1997 Storp managed to reach old lengths. Her season's best was 19.89 metres, which was the third best throw in Europe that year. She also had success in the major competitions, albeit not with the same results: she finished fourth at the 1997 World Indoor Championships despite throwing only 18.80 metres, and at the 1997 World Championships she won the bronze medal, beating Chinese Huang Zhihong to third place with a seven centimetre margin. Astrid Kumbernuss won, Vita Pavlysh took the silver medal.

1998 was Storp's swansong season as an athlete. She managed a 19.12 metres throw in May in Vöhrum, and qualified for the 1998 European Championships, where she finished ninth with 18.16 metres. By then she had already taken up basketball, playing for SV Halchtern/Linden in the second highest German league. She attempted a comeback to athletics in 2000, but without success.

In domestic competitions, she represented the sports clubs LG Braunschweig and VfL Wolfsburg. She became German champion in 1994, won silver medals at the national championships in the years 1998–1993, 1997 and 1998 and bronze medals in 1986, 1987, 1995 and 1996. She became German indoor champion in 1991, 1993 and 1997.

Stephanie Storp is unusually tall for a woman with 1.94 metres. During her active career she weighed 95 kg.
