= Ines Müller =

German shot putter (born 1959)

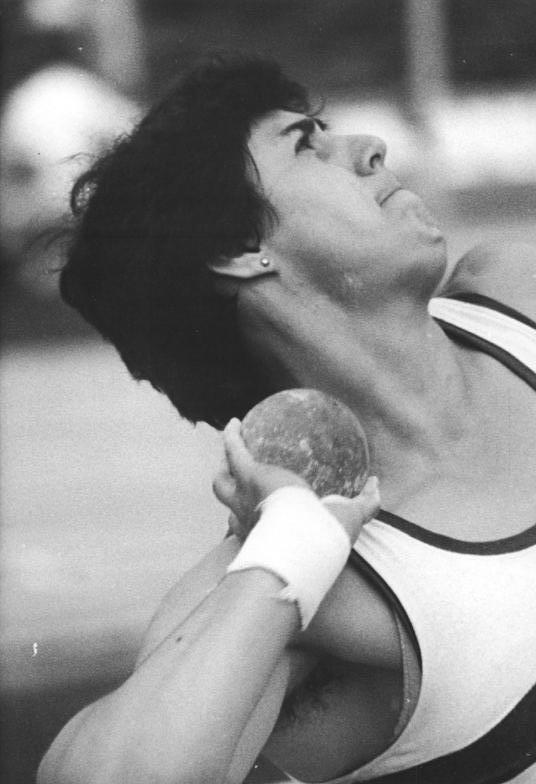

Personal information
- Nationality: East Germany
- Born: Ines Reichenbach; 2 January 1959 (age 67) Grimma, Saxony, East Germany
- Height: 1.82 m (6 ft 0 in)
- Weight: 90 kg (198 lb)

Sport
- Country: East Germany
- Sport: Athletics
- Event: Shot put
- Club: SC Empor Rostock

Achievements and titles
- Personal best: 21.57 m (1988)
Medal record
Women's athletics
Representing East Germany
World Championships
Bronze medal – third place	1987 Rome	Shot put
European Championships
Silver medal – second place	1986 Stuttgart	Shot put
Summer Universiade
Silver medal – second place	1981 Bucharest	Shot put

Ines Müller, née Reichenbach (born 2 January 1959 in Grimma, Muldentalkreis, Saxony), is a German track and field athlete who represented East Germany in the shot put during the 1980s. Her biggest success was the bronze medal in the 1987 World Championship.

== International Competitions ==
Year	Competition	Venue	Position	Notes
representing East Germany
1980	Olympic Games	Moscow, Soviet Union	8th	19.66 m
1981	Universiade	Bucharest, Romania	2nd	19.66 m
1985	World Indoor Games	Paris, France	2nd	19.68 m
1986	European Championships	Stuttgart, Germany	2nd	20.81 m
1987	World Championships	Rome, Italy	3rd	20.76 m
1988	Olympic Games	Seoul, South Korea	4th	19.79 m

Müller represented the Empor Rostock sport club. During her sporting career she was 1.82 meters tall and weighed 90 kilograms.
