= Cong Yuzhen =

Chinese shot putter (born 1963)

Medal record

Women's athletics

Representing China

Asian Championships
Gold medal – first place	1985 Jakarta	Shot put
Gold medal – first place	1987 Singapore	Shot put

Cong Yuzhen (simplified Chinese: 丛玉珍; traditional Chinese: 叢玉珍; pinyin: Cóng Yùzhēn; born January 22, 1963) is a former shot put athlete from China. She competed at the 1988 Summer Olympics in Seoul, South Korea, finishing in ninth place in the overall-rankings.

== Achievements ==
Year	Competition	Venue	Position	Notes
Representing China
1988	Olympic Games	Seoul, South Korea	9th	19.69 m
