= Bonnie Dasse =

American shot putter

Personal information
- Born: July 22, 1959 (age 66) Abilene, Texas

Sport
- Sport: Track and field

Bonnie Lee Dasse (born July 22, 1959) is a retired female track and field athlete from the United States, who competed in the women's shot put event. She twice represented her native country at the Summer Olympics: 1988 and 1992. She tested positive for the banned substance clenbuterol at the 1992 Olympics.

== Achievements ==
Year	Competition	Venue	Position	Notes
Representing the United States
1988	Olympic Games	Seoul, South Korea	12th	17.60 m
1992	Olympic Games	Barcelona, Spain	—	DSQ
