= Kathrin Neimke =

East German shot putter

Personal information
- Nationality: German
- Born: 18 July 1966 (age 59) Magdeburg, Saxony-Anhalt, East Germany
- Height: 5 ft 10 1/2 in (1.79 m)
- Weight: 91 kg (201 lb)

Sport
- Country: East Germany (1987–1990); Germany (1991–1996)
- Sport: Athletics
- Event: Shot put
- Club: SC Magdeburg
- Coached by: Klaus Schneider

Achievements and titles
- Personal best: 21.21 m (1987)
Medal record
Women's athletics
Representing East Germany
Olympic Games
Silver medal – second place	1988 Seoul	Shot put
World Championships
Silver medal – second place	1987 Rome	Shot put
European Championships
Bronze medal – third place	1990 Split	Shot put
European Indoor Championships
Bronze medal – third place	1988 Budapest	Shot put
Representing Germany
Olympic Games
Bronze medal – third place	1992 Barcelona	Shot put
World Championships
Bronze medal – third place	1993 Stuttgart	Shot put
World Indoor Championships
Gold medal – first place	1995 Barcelona	Shot put

Kathrin Neimke (18 July 1966 in Magdeburg, Saxony-Anhalt) is a German track and field athlete. During the 1980s and 1990s, she was one of the world's best in the shot put. Until 1990 she represented East Germany. She won two Olympic medals, the first a silver medal at the 1988 Summer Olympics in Seoul, and the second a bronze at the 1992 Summer Olympics in Barcelona.

Neimke represented SC Magdeburg and trained with Klaus Schneider. She is 1.80 meters tall and during her active career she weighed 95 kilograms. She has a degree in sales and at the end of her sporting career she had a job as reproduction photographer at a daily newspaper. After that she went to the Saxony-Anhalt police.

== International competitions ==
Year	Competition	Venue	Position	Notes
Representing East Germany
1987	Universiade	Zagreb, Yugoslavia	2nd	20.07 m
1987	World Championships	Rome, Italy	2nd	21.21 m
1988	European Indoor Championships	Budapest, Hungary	3rd	20.20 m
1988	Olympic Games	Seoul, South Korea	2nd	21.07 m
1990	European Championships	Split, Yugoslavia	3rd	19.96 m
Representing Germany
1991	World Indoor Championships	Seville, Spain	6th	18.77 m
1991	World Championships	Tokyo, Japan	8th	18.83 m
1992	Olympic Games	Barcelona, Spain	3rd	19.78 m
1992	World Cup	Havana, Cuba	3rd	17.97 m
1993	World Indoor Championships	Toronto, Canada	8th	18.50 m
1993	World Championships	Stuttgart, Germany	3rd	19.71 m
1994	European Championships	Helsinki, Finland	6th	18.94 m
1995	World Indoor Championships	Barcelona, Spain	1st	19.40 m
1995	World Championships	Gothenburg, Sweden	4th	19.30 m
1996	Olympic Games	Atlanta, United States	7th	18.92 m
