= Ramona Pagel =

American shot putter

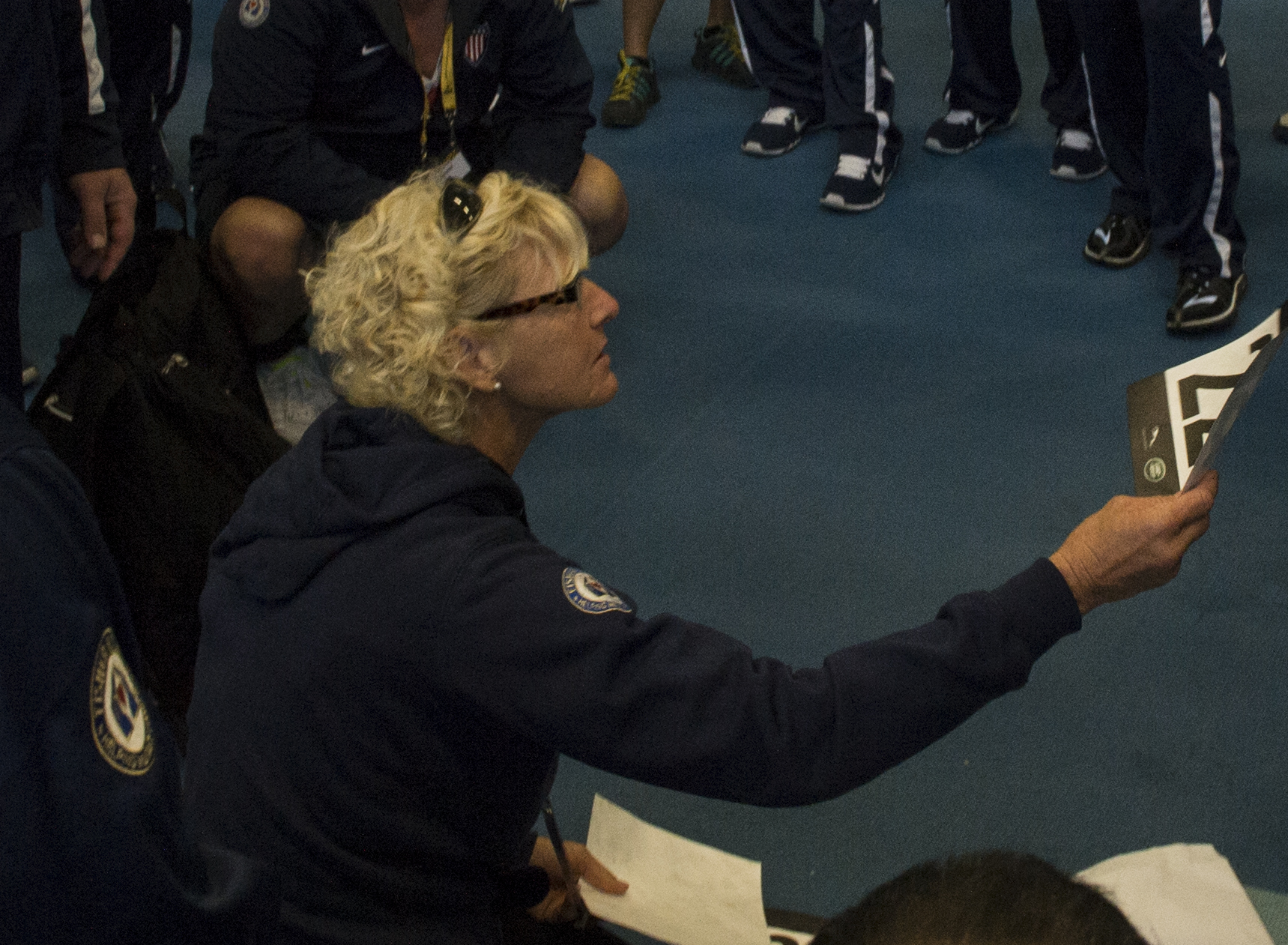
- Pagel at the Invictus Games in 2014

Personal information
- Born: Ramona Ebert; November 10, 1961 (age 64) Los Angeles, California, U.S.
- Height: 5 ft 11.5 in (1.82 m)
- Weight: 180 lb (82 kg)

Sport
- Country: United States
- Sport: Track and field
- Events: Shot put, Discus throw
- Coached by: Kent Pagel
Medal record
Women's Athletics
Representing the United States
Pan American Games
| Gold medal – first place | 1987 Indianapolis | Shot Put |
| Bronze medal – third place | 1991 Havana | Shot Put |
| Silver medal – second place | 1995 Mar de Plata | Shot Put |
World University Games
| Bronze medal – third place | 1985 Kobe | Shot Put |
- Updated on 5 May 2012

Ramona Pagel (born Ramona Ebert, November 10, 1961 in Los Angeles) is a retired American shot putter. She made four consecutive Olympic teams, 1984-1996, four IAAF World Championships and won a full set of medals in three showings at the Pan American Games. Her personal best put was 20.18 metres, achieved in June 1988 in San Diego. That mark was the American record for 25 years. The record was tied 23 years later by Jillian Camarena-Williams in 2011 and was finally beaten by Michelle Carter at the 2013 USA Outdoor Track and Field Championships. Two days before her record was beaten, Stamatia Scarvelis, coached by Pagel, won the Junior National Championship at the same meet.

Ramona attended Schurr High School in Montebello, California. In 1979, she placed 3rd in CIF California State Meet, throwing the 8 Lb. Shot 47' 5¼". Not only was that the third best in the competition, it was the third best in state history (in the 6 years that weight was thrown). The weight was changed to 4 Kg the following year.

Her next school was Long Beach State, where she met and married UCLA and former Fullerton High School thrower Kent Pagel. He coached her throughout her career. She left LBSU in 1982 and transferred to San Diego State University, where she would ultimately complete her studies. Through her career, she was ranked in the top 10 American shot putters 16 years in a row, from 1981 to 1996, including the No. 1 ranking from 1985 to 1989. She also spent 8 years on the American Discus list, until back problems caused her to choose to focus on her best event.

Pagel also collects Pooh bear dolls.

== International competitions ==
| Year | Competition | Venue | Position | Notes |
Representing the United States
| 1984 | Olympic Games | Los Angeles, United States | 11th | |
| 1985 | World Indoor Games | Paris, France | 5th | |
| 1985 | Universiade | Kobe, Japan | 3rd | |
| 1985 | World Cup | Canberra, Australia | 6th | |
| 1987 | World Indoor Championships | Indianapolis, United States | 6th | |
| 1987 | Pan American Games | Indianapolis, United States | 1st | |
| 1987 | World Championships | Rome, Italy | 16th | |
| 1988 | Olympic Games | Seoul, South Korea | 15th | 18.55 m |
| 1989 | World Indoor Championships | Budapest, Hungary | 9th | |
| 1989 | World Cup | Barcelona, Spain | 6th | |
| 1991 | World Indoor Championships | Seville, Spain | 9th | |
| 1991 | Pan American Games | Havana, Cuba | 3rd | |
| 1991 | World Championships | Tokyo, Japan | 13th | |
| 1992 | Olympic Games | Barcelona, Spain | 11th | 18.24 m |
| 1993 | World Championships | Stuttgart, Germany | 12th | |
| 1995 | Pan American Games | Mar del Plata, Argentina | 2nd | |
| 1995 | World Championships | Gothenburg, Sweden | 7th | 18.81 m |
| 1996 | Olympic Games | Atlanta, United States | 9th | |
