= Heike Hartwig =

East German shot putter

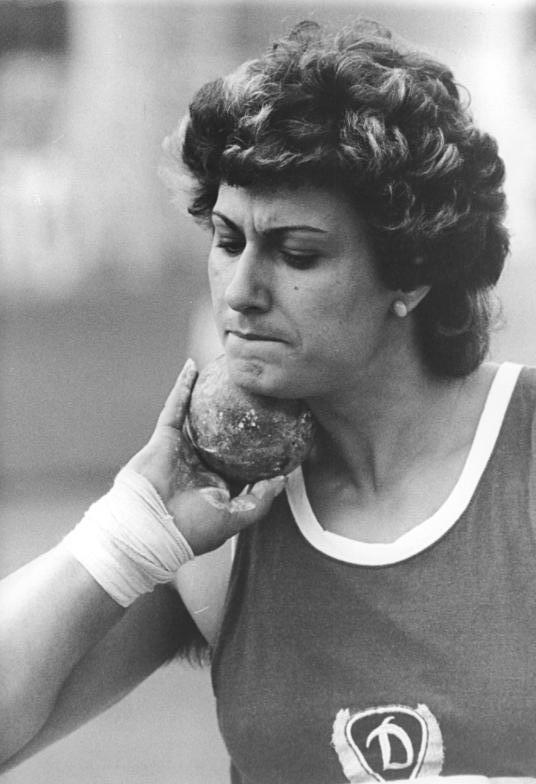
Heike Hartwig became GDR-champion in 1987

Heike Hartwig (born 30 December 1962 in Bernburg, Bezirk Halle) is a retired East German shot putter.

She represented the sports club SC Dynamo Berlin, and became East German championships in 1987, 1989 and 1990.

Her personal best throw was 21.31 metres, achieved in May 1988 in Athens. This ranks her seventh among German shot putters, behind Ilona Slupianek, Claudia Losch, Marianne Adam, Margitta Droese, Ines Müller and Eva Wilms.

== Achievements ==
Year	Competition	Venue	Position	Notes
Representing East Germany
1985	European Indoor Championships	Piraeus, Greece	3rd	19.93 m
1985	World Cup	Canberra, Australia	2nd	19.98 m
1986	European Championships	Stuttgart, West Germany	5th	20.14 m
1987	European Indoor Championships	Liévin, France	3rd	20.00 m
1987	World Championships	Rome, Italy	6th	20.63 m
1988	Olympic Games	Seoul, South Korea	6th	20.20 m
1989	European Indoor Championships	The Hague, Netherlands	2nd	20.03 m
1989	World Indoor Championships	Budapest, Hungary	5th	19.44 m
1989	World Cup	Barcelona, Spain	2nd	20.62 m
1990	European Championships	Split, Yugoslavia	6th	18.90 m
