= Andreas Krieger =

East German shot putter

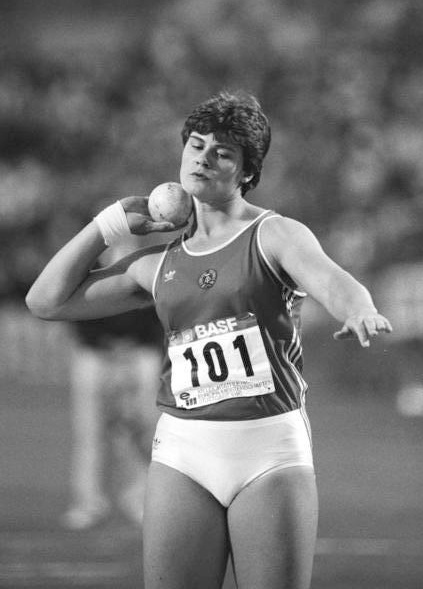
- Krieger competing at the 1986 European Championships

Medal record

Women's athletics

Representing East Germany

European Championships
Gold medal – first place	1986 Stuttgart	Shot put

Andreas Krieger (born 20 July 1965) is a German former shot putter who competed in the 1980s on the women's East German athletics team at SC Dynamo Berlin as Heidi Krieger.

Starting at age 16, he was systematically and unknowingly doped with anabolic steroids for years by East German officials, causing his body to become more masculine. In the 1990s Krieger came out as a trans man and underwent gender affirmation surgery. Krieger says that, while he did experience uncertainty about his sexual identity before being doped, he felt that the doping abuses "killed Heidi."

== Athletics career ==
At the 1986 European Championships in Athletics, Krieger won the gold medal in the shot put event after putting the shot at 21.10 m (69 ft 3 in). Krieger retired in 1991.

== Doping ==
Krieger was systematically doped with steroids from the age of 16 onward. According to Werner Franke and Brigitte Berendonk's 1991 book, Doping: From Research to Deceit, Krieger took almost 2,600 milligrams of steroids in 1986; nearly 1,000 milligrams more than Ben Johnson took during the 1988 Summer Olympics.

As early as the age of 18, Krieger began developing visibly male characteristics. Eventually, years of doping left him with many masculine traits. By 1997, at the age of 31, Krieger underwent sex reassignment surgery and changed his name to Andreas. Krieger had "felt out of place and longed in some vague way to be a boy", and said in a 2004 interview in The New York Times that he was "glad that he became a man". However, he felt that receiving hormones without his consent deprived him of the right to "find out for myself which sex I wanted to be." Krieger's sex change operation dominated Germany's news headlines and focused widespread attention on the legacy of doping in East Germany, leading other former athletes to speak out in public for the first time.

Krieger gave evidence at the trial of Manfred Ewald, leader of the East German sports programme and president of the East German Olympic committee and Manfred Höppner, East German medical director in Berlin in 2000. Both Ewald and Höppner were convicted of accessory to the "intentional bodily harm of athletes, including minors".

Krieger was forced to retire in part due to experiencing severe pain from lifting massive amounts of weight while on steroids. Even today, he has severe pain in his hips and thighs, and can only withstand mild exertion.

The Heidi Krieger Medal (German: Heidi-Krieger-Medaille), named after Krieger, is now awarded annually to Germans who combat doping. Krieger's gold medal from 1986 forms part of the trophy.

== Personal life ==
Krieger is married to former East German swimmer Ute Krause, who was also a victim of massive doping by East German sports officials.

== Broadcasting ==
The PBS series Secrets of the Dead featured Krieger in an episode covering the doping of East German athletes by the East German government covered-up by the Stasi.

In 2008 Ukrainian filmmakers released the documentary Doping. Factory of Champions based on Krieger's story.

Krieger's story was mentioned in the first episode of the BBC documentary The Lost World of Communism.

Krieger's half-sister through his father's second marriage, Susann Krieger, won the Deutsche Radiopreis 2017 (German Radio Prize) for her feature Gedoptes Gold – Wie aus Heidi Andreas wurde ("Doped Gold – how Heidi became Andreas"), about her brother's life and her reunion with him.
