= Iris Plotzitzka =

German shot putter (1966–2024)

Iris Plotzitzka (born 7 January 1966 – 19 October 2024) was a German shot putter representing West Germany.

She represented the sports clubs LAC Quelle Fürth and LC Olympiapark München, and won the silver medal at the West German championships in 1986. Her personal best throw was 20.53 metres, achieved in August 1988 in Köln.

== Achievements ==
Year	Competition	Venue	Position	Notes
Representing West Germany
1986	European Championships	Stuttgart, West Germany	7th	
1987	World Indoor Championships	Indianapolis, United States	8th	17.97 m
1987	European Indoor Championships	Liévin, France	4th	
1987	World Championships	Rome, Italy	12th	19.19 m
1988	Olympic Games	Seoul, South Korea	14th	19.06 m
1989	European Indoor Championships	The Hague, Netherlands	3rd	
1990	European Indoor Championships	Glasgow, Scotland	5th	
1990	European Championships	Split, Yugoslavia	5th	19.51 m
