= 1986 European Athletics Championships =

14th European Athletics Championships
- The logo of the 1986 European Athletics Championships
- Dates: 26–31 August
- Host city: Stuttgart, Baden-Württemberg, West Germany
- Venue: Neckarstadion
- Level: Senior
- Type: Outdoor
- Events: 43
- Participation: 906 athletes from 31 nations

The 14th European Athletics Championships were held from 26 to 31 August 1986 at the Neckarstadion, now known as MHPArena, in Stuttgart, a city in West Germany.

Contemporaneous reports were given in the Glasgow Herald.

== Men's results ==
Complete results were published.

=== Track ===
1978 | 1982 | 1986 | 1990 | 1994

Event	Gold		Silver		Bronze	
100 metres	Linford Christie; Great Britain	10.15	Steffen Bringmann; East Germany	10.20	Bruno Marie-Rose; France	10.21
200 metres	Vladimir Krylov; Soviet Union	20.52	Jürgen Evers; West Germany	20.75	Andrey Fedoriv; Soviet Union	20.84
400 metres	Roger Black; Great Britain	44.59	Thomas Schönlebe; East Germany	44.63	Mathias Schersing; East Germany	44.85
800 metres	Sebastian Coe; Great Britain	1:44.50	Tom McKean; Great Britain	1:44.61	Steve Cram; Great Britain	1:44.88
1500 metres	Steve Cram; Great Britain	3:41.09	Sebastian Coe; Great Britain	3:41.67	Han Kulker; Netherlands	3:42.11
5000 metres	Jack Buckner; Great Britain	13:10.15	Stefano Mei; Italy	13:11.57	Tim Hutchings; Great Britain	13:12.88
10,000 metres	Stefano Mei; Italy	27:56.79	Alberto Cova; Italy	27:57.93	Salvatore Antibo; Italy	28:00.25
Marathon	Gelindo Bordin; Italy	2: 10:54	Orlando Pizzolato; Italy	2: 10:57	Herbert Steffny; West Germany	2: 11:30
110 metres hurdles	Stéphane Caristan; France	13.20	Arto Bryggare; Finland	13.42	Carlos Sala; Spain	13.50
400 metres hurdles	Harald Schmid; West Germany	48.65	Aleksandr Vasilyev; Soviet Union	48.76	Sven Nylander; Sweden	49.38
3000 metres steeplechase	Hagen Melzer; East Germany	8:16.65	Francesco Panetta; Italy	8:16.85	Patriz Ilg; West Germany	8:16.92
20 kilometres walk	Jozef Pribilinec; Czechoslovakia	1: 21:15	Maurizio Damilano; Italy	1: 21:17	Miguel Ángel Prieto; Spain	1: 21:36
50 kilometres walk	Hartwig Gauder; East Germany	3:40:55	Vyacheslav Ivanenko; Soviet Union	3:41:54	Valeriy Suntsov; Soviet Union	3:42:38
4 × 100 metres relay	Aleksandr Yevgenyev; Nikolay Yuschmanov; Vladimir Muravyov; Viktor Bryzgin; Soviet Union (URS)	38.29	Thomas Schröder; Steffen Bringmann; Olaf Prenzler; Frank Emmelmann; East Germany (GDR)	38.64	Elliot Bunney; Daley Thompson; Mike McFarlane; Linford Christie; Great Britain (GBR)	38.71
4 × 400 metres relay	Derek Redmond; Kriss Akabusi; Brian Whittle; Roger Black; Great Britain (GBR)	2:59.84	Klaus Just; Edgar Itt; Harald Schmid; Ralf Lübke; West Germany (FRG)	3:00.17	Vladimir Prosin; Vladimir Krylov; Arkadiy Kornilov; Aleksandr Kurotchikin; Soviet Union (URS)	3:00.47

=== Field ===
1978 | 1982 | 1986 | 1990 | 1994

Event	Gold		Silver		Bronze	
High jump	Igor Paklin; Soviet Union	2.34	Sergey Malchenko; Soviet Union	2.31	Carlo Thränhardt; West Germany	2.31
Long jump	Robert Emmiyan; Soviet Union	8.41	Sergey Layevskiy; Soviet Union	8.01	Giovanni Evangelisti; Italy	7.92
Pole vault	Sergey Bubka; Soviet Union	5.85	Vasiliy Bubka; Soviet Union	5.75	Philippe Collet; France	5.75
Triple jump	Khristo Markov; Bulgaria	17.66	Māris Bružiks; Soviet Union	17.33	Oleg Protsenko; Soviet Union	17.28
Shot put	Werner Günthör; Switzerland	22.22	Ulf Timmermann; East Germany	21.84	Udo Beyer; East Germany	20.74
Discus throw	Romas Ubartas; Soviet Union	67.08	Georgiy Kolnootchenko; Soviet Union	66.32	Vaclavas Kidykas; Soviet Union	65.60
Javelin throw	Klaus Tafelmeier; West Germany	84.76	Detlef Michel; East Germany	81.90	Viktor Yevsyukov; Soviet Union	81.80
Hammer throw	Yuriy Sedykh; Soviet Union	86.74; WR	Sergey Litvinov; Soviet Union	85.74	Igor Nikulin; Soviet Union	82.20
Decathlon	Daley Thompson; Great Britain	8811	Jürgen Hingsen; West Germany	8730	Siegfried Wentz; West Germany	8676

== Women's results ==
=== Track ===
1978 | 1982 | 1986 | 1990 | 1994

Event	Gold		Silver		Bronze	
100 metres	Marlies Göhr; East Germany	10.91	Aneliya Nuneva; Bulgaria	11.04	Nelli Cooman; Netherlands	11.08
200 metres	Heike Drechsler; East Germany	21.71; WR	Marie-Christine Cazier; France	22.32	Silke Gladisch; East Germany	22.64
400 metres	Marita Koch; East Germany	48.22	Olga Vladykina; Soviet Union	49.67	Petra Muller; East Germany	49.88
800 metres	Nadiya Olizarenko; Soviet Union	1:57.15	Sigrun Wodars; East Germany	1:57.42	Lyubov Gurina; Soviet Union	1:57.73
1500 metres	Ravilya Agletdinova; Soviet Union	4:01.19	Tetyana Samolenko; Soviet Union	4:02.36	Doina Melinte; Romania	4:02.44
3000 metres	Olga Bondarenko; Soviet Union	8:33.99	Maricica Puică; Romania	8:35.92	Yvonne Murray; Great Britain	8:37.15
10,000 metres	Ingrid Kristiansen; Norway	30:23.25	Olga Bondarenko; Soviet Union	30:57.21	Ulrike Bruns; East Germany	31:19.76
Marathon	Rosa Mota; Portugal	2:28:38	Laura Fogli; Italy	2:32:52	Yekaterina Khramenkova; Soviet Union	2:34:18
100 metres hurdles	Yordanka Donkova; Bulgaria	12.38	Cornelia Oschkenat; East Germany	12.55	Ginka Zagorcheva; Bulgaria	12.70
400 metres hurdles	Marina Stepanova; Soviet Union	53.32; WR	Sabine Busch; East Germany	53.60	Cornelia Feuerbach; East Germany	54.13
10 kilometres walk	Mari Cruz Díaz; Spain	46:09	Ann Jansson; Sweden	46:13	Siv Ibáñez; Sweden	46:19
4 × 100 metres relay	Silke Gladisch; Sabine Rieger; Ingrid Auerswald; Marlies Göhr; East Germany (GDR)	41.84	Ginka Zagorcheva; Aneliya Nuneva; Yordanka Donkova; Nadezhda Georgieva; Bulgaria (BUL)	42.68	Antonina Nastoburko; Natalya Bochina; Marina Zhirova; Olga Zolotaryova; Soviet Union (URS)	42.74
4 × 400 metres relay	Kirsten Emmelmann; Sabine Busch; Petra Müller; Marita Koch; East Germany (GDR)	3:16.87	Gisela Kinzel; Ute Thimm; Heidi-Elke Gaugel; Gaby Bussmann; West Germany (FRG)	3:22.80	Ewa Kasprzyk; Marzena Wojdecka; Elżbieta Kapusta; Genowefa Błaszak; Poland (POL)	3:24.65

=== Field ===
1978 | 1982 | 1986 | 1990 | 1994

Event	Gold		Silver		Bronze	
High jump	Stefka Kostadinova; Bulgaria	2.00	Svetlana Isaeva-Leseva; Bulgaria	1.93	Olga Turchak; Soviet Union	1.93
Long jump	Heike Drechsler; East Germany	7.27	Galina Chistyakova; Soviet Union	7.09	Helga Radtke; East Germany	6.89
Shot put	Heidi Krieger; East Germany	21.10	Ines Müller; East Germany	20.81	Natalya Akhrimenko; Soviet Union	20.68
Discus throw	Diana Sachse; East Germany	71.36	Tsvetanka Khristova; Bulgaria	69.52	Martina Opitz; East Germany	68.26
Javelin throw	Fatima Whitbread; Great Britain	76.32	Petra Felke; East Germany	72.52	Beate Peters; West Germany	68.04
Heptathlon	Anke Behmer; East Germany	6717	Natalya Schubenkova; Soviet Union	6645	Judy Simpson; Great Britain	6623

All the medals https://www.youtube.com/watch?v=Z1dLKh0aH1U&list=PLK1QYHf4OvhN6ydKbmo2wLecwCOef15SL

== Medal table ==
* Host nation (West Germany)

Rank	Nation	Gold	Silver	Bronze	Total
1	Soviet Union (URS)	11	13	12	36
2	East Germany (GDR)	11	10	8	29
3	Great Britain (GBR)	8	2	5	15
4	Bulgaria (BUL)	3	4	1	8
5	Italy (ITA)	2	6	2	10
6	West Germany (FRG)*	2	4	5	11
7	France (FRA)	1	1	2	4
8	Spain (ESP)	1	0	2	3
9	Czechoslovakia (TCH)	1	0	0	1
9	Norway (NOR)	1	0	0	1
9	Portugal (POR)	1	0	0	1
9	Switzerland (SUI)	1	0	0	1
13	Sweden (SWE)	0	1	2	3
14	Romania (ROU)	0	1	1	2
15	Finland (FIN)	0	1	0	1
16	Netherlands (NED)	0	0	2	2
17	Poland (POL)	0	0	1	1
Totals (17 entries)		43	43	43	129

== Participation ==
According to an unofficial count, 878 athletes from 31 countries participated in the event, 28 athletes less than the official number of 906 as published.

- Austria (17)
- Belgium (20)
- Bulgaria (34)
- Cyprus (6)
- Czechoslovakia (29)
- Denmark (17)
- East Germany (65)
- Finland (31)
- France (59)
- Gibraltar (1)
- Great Britain (79)
- Greece (6)
- Hungary (24)
- Iceland (3)
- Ireland (12)
- Italy (47)
- Liechtenstein (2)
- Luxembourg (2)
- Malta (1)
- Netherlands (16)
- Norway (30)
- Poland (34)
- Portugal (21)
- Romania (16)
- Soviet Union (98)
- Spain (33)
- Sweden (49)
- Switzerland (26)
- Turkey (6)
- West Germany (82)
- Yugoslavia (12)

== See also ==
- 1986 in the sport of athletics

== Notes ==
Differences to competition format since the 1982 European Championships:

New events added:

- Women's 20 km walk replaces the 10 km walk .
- Women's 10 000 m.
