= Natalya Lisovskaya =

World and Olympic champion shot putter

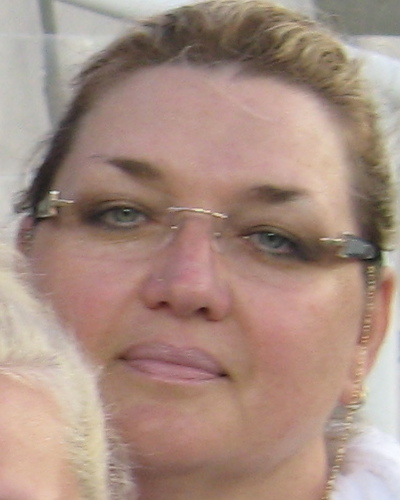

Personal information
- Native name: Наталья Венедиктовна Лисовская (-Седых)
- Full name: Nataliya Venediktovna Sedykh
- Nationality: Russian
- Citizenship: Russia
- Born: Nataliya Venediktovna Lisovskaya; 16 July 1962 (age 64) Alegazy, Bashkir ASSR, Russian SFSR, Soviet Union
- Height: 1.88 m (6 ft 2 in)
- Weight: 105 kg (231 lb)
- Spouse: Yuriy Sedykh
Medal record
Women's Athletics
Representing Soviet Union
Olympic Games
Gold medal – first place	1988 Seoul	Shot put
World Championships
Gold medal – first place	1987 Rome	Shot put
Silver medal – second place	1991 Tokyo	Shot put
World Indoor Championships
Gold medal – first place	1985 Paris	Shot put
Gold medal – first place	1987 Indianapolis	Shot put
European Championships
Silver medal – second place	1990 Split	Shot put
IAAF World Cup
Gold medal – first place	1985 Canberra	Shot put
Summer Universiade
Gold medal – first place	1983 Edmonton	Shot put
Gold medal – first place	1985 Kobe	Shot put
Gold medal – first place	1987 Zagreb	Shot put

Natalya Venediktovna Lisovskaya (Russian: Наталья Венедиктовна Лисовская; born 16 July 1962) is a Russian former athlete who mainly competed in shot put for the Soviet Union. She holds the world record in the event, with a mark set in 1987. Lisovskaya trained at Spartak in Moscow.

== Career ==
Born in Alegazy, Lisovskaya competed for the USSR at the 1988 Summer Olympics held in Seoul, South Korea, where she won the gold medal. Lisovskaya holds the world record in women's shot put with a throw of 22.63 metres (74 feet 3 inches), which she achieved on 7 June 1987 in Moscow, Russia. She also has the three furthest throws of all time by a female shot putter.

After her Olympic career ended, she gained French citizenship and competed between 1999 and 2002 at some local competitions in France.

Lisovskaya married men's hammer throw world record holder Yuriy Sedykh and has one daughter, Alexia. They live in Paris, France.

Records
Preceded by (East Germany) Ilona Slupianek	Women's Shot Put World Record Holder; 7 June 1987 –	Succeeded by incumbent
