= Athletics at the 1997 Summer Universiade – Women's shot put =

The women's shot put event at the 1997 Summer Universiade was held at the Stadio Cibali in Catania, Italy on 28 August.

== Results ==
Rank	Athlete	Nationality	Result	Notes
1st place, gold medalist(s)	Irina Korzhanenko	Russia	19.39	
2nd place, silver medalist(s)	Corrie de Bruin	Netherlands	18.65	
3rd place, bronze medalist(s)	Tressa Thompson	United States	18.26	
4	Bao Dongying	China	18.22	
5	Elisângela Adriano	Brazil	17.88	
6	Song Feina	China	17.53	
7	Martina de la Puente	Spain	17.16	
8	Janina Karolchyk	Belarus	16.98	
9	Lee Myung-Sun	South Korea	16.75	
10	Katarzyna Żakowicz	Poland	16.75	
11	Lieja Koeman	Netherlands	16.27	
12	Crystal Brownlee	United States	15.34	
13	Helena Engman	Sweden	13.99	
14	Valbona Laukaj	Albania	12.99	
15	Alexandra Amaro	Brazil	12.88	
16	Henriette Jensen	Denmark	11.81	
17	Johanna Manuel	Namibia	11.23	
