= Athletics at the 1997 Summer Universiade – Women's discus throw =

The women's discus throw event at the 1997 Summer Universiade was held at the Stadio Cibali in Catania, Italy on 26 and 27 August. The winning margin was 6.02 metres which as of 2024 remains the only time the women's discus throw was won by more than six metres at these games.

== Medalists ==
Gold	Silver	Bronze
Natalya Sadova; Russia	Hu Honglian; China	Nicoleta Grasu; Romania

== Results ==
=== Qualification ===
Rank	Athlete	Nationality	Result	Notes
1	Natalya Sadova	Russia	63.00	Q
2	Nicoleta Grasu	Romania	60.44	
3	Olena Antonova	Ukraine	59.54	
4	Elisângela Adriano	Brazil	57.48	
5	Katarzyna Żakowicz	Poland	56.86	
6	Aretha Hill	United States	55.30	
7	Viktoriya Boyko	Ukraine	55.22	
8	Hu Honglian	China	55.14	
9	Bao Dongying	China	54.90	
10	Veerle Blondeel	Belgium	51.94	
11	Monique Kuenen	Netherlands	51.78	
12	Shelley Drew	Great Britain	51.06	
13	Shelly Borrman	United States	51.06	
14	Adrienne Lynn	New Zealand	50.78	
15	Lieja Koeman	Netherlands	50.68	
16	Janina Karolchyk	Belarus	48.80	
17	Monique Nacsa	Australia	43.92	
18	Helena Engman	Sweden	42.12	
19	Ana Lucía Espinoza	Guatemala	35.44	
20	Johanna Manuel	Namibia	32.70	

=== Final ===
Rank	Athlete	Nationality	Result	Notes
1st place, gold medalist(s)	Natalya Sadova	Russia	67.02	
2nd place, silver medalist(s)	Hu Honglian	China	61.00	
3rd place, bronze medalist(s)	Nicoleta Grasu	Romania	60.08	
4	Olena Antonova	Ukraine	59.60	
5	Elisângela Adriano	Brazil	57.56	
6	Aretha Hill	United States	56.12	
7	Bao Dongying	China	55.96	
8	Viktoriya Boyko	Ukraine	55.44	
9	Katarzyna Żakowicz	Poland	55.24	
10	Veerle Blondeel	Belgium	52.64	
11	Shelley Drew	Great Britain	52.14	
12	Monique Kuenen	Netherlands	52.06	
