= 2004 IAAF World Indoor Championships – Women's shot put =

The Women's shot put event at the 2004 IAAF World Indoor Championships was held on March 5.

== Medalists ==
Gold	Silver	Bronze
Svetlana Krivelyova; Russia	Yumileidi Cumbá; Cuba	Nadine Kleinert; Germany

Note: Vita Pavlysh had originally won the gold but was later stripped off it for the use of anabolic steroids.

== Results ==
=== Qualification ===
Qualifying performance 18.50 (Q) or 8 best performers (q) advanced to the final.

Rank	Group	Athlete	Nationality	#1	#2	#3	Result	Notes
1	A	Svetlana Krivelyova	Russia	19.46			19.46	Q
2	B	Yumileidi Cumbá	Cuba	X	19.13		19.13	Q, SB
DQ	B	Vita Pavlysh	Ukraine	~~18.88~~			~~18.88~~	Q, Doping
3	A	Li Meiju	China	18.76			18.76	Q, SB
4	A	Nadine Kleinert	Germany	18.62			18.62	Q
5	A	Nadzeya Ostapchuk	Belarus	18.60			18.60	Q, SB
6	A	Misleydis González	Cuba	18.56			18.56	Q, PB
7	B	Krystyna Zabawska	Poland	X	X	18.42	18.42	q
8	A	Lieja Tunks	Netherlands	X	18.39	18.36	18.39	SB
9	B	Natallia Mikhnevich	Belarus	18.33	18.34	X	18.34	
10	B	Valerie Vili	New Zealand	17.96	18.22	17.72	18.22	AR
11	A	Cleopatra Borel-Brown	Trinidad and Tobago	18.19	X	16.96	18.19	
12	B	Assunta Legnante	Italy	18.15	17.95	X	18.15	
13	A	Cristiana Checchi	Italy	X	X	18.11	18.11	
14	A	Kristin Heaston	United States	16.53	17.52	17.86	17.86	
15	B	Laurence Manfredi	France	17.37	17.26	17.39	17.39	
16	B	Li Fengfeng	China	17.16	16.85	16.91	17.16	SB
17	A	Irini Terzoglou	Greece	16.80	16.95	17.04	17.04	
18	B	Elisângela Adriano	Brazil	16.31	16.64	16.59	16.64	

=== Final ===
Rank	Athlete	Nationality	#1	#2	#3	#4	#5	#6	Result	Notes
DQ	Vita Pavlysh	Ukraine	~~19.08~~	~~20.39~~	X	~~20.49~~	X	~~19.55~~	~~20.49~~	Doping
1st place, gold medalist(s)	Svetlana Krivelyova	Russia	19.20	19.90	X	19.17	19.82	X	19.90	SB
2nd place, silver medalist(s)	Yumileidi Cumbá	Cuba	19.00	19.21	19.31	X	19.18	18.94	19.31	SB
3rd place, bronze medalist(s)	Nadine Kleinert	Germany	19.05	17.73	18.70	18.68	18.17	18.72	19.05	SB
4	Krystyna Zabawska	Poland	19.00	18.16	18.71	X	X	X	19.00	SB
5	Li Meiju	China	18.69	X	18.00	X	18.18	18.47	18.69	
6	Misleydis González	Cuba	18.20	18.17	17.95	18.41	X	X	18.41	
7	Nadzeya Ostapchuk	Belarus	17.85	X	X	18.33	X	X	18.33	
