= 2003 IAAF World Indoor Championships – Women's shot put =

The men's shot put event at the 2003 IAAF World Indoor Championships was held on March 15.

== Medalists ==
Gold	Silver	Bronze
Irina Korzhanenko; Russia	Nadzeya Astapchuk; Belarus	Astrid Kumbernuss; Germany

== Results ==
=== Qualification ===
Qualifying performance 18.45 (Q) or 8 best performers (q) advanced to the Final.

Rank	Athlete	Nationality	#1	#2	#3	Result	Notes
1	Yanina Karolchyk-Pravalinskaya	Belarus	19.12			19.12	Q, PB
2	Irina Korzhanenko	Russia	X	19.10		19.10	Q
3	Vita Pavlysh	Ukraine	18.79			18.79	Q
4	Yumileidi Cumbá	Cuba	18.33	18.42	18.71	18.71	Q
5	Svetlana Krivelyova	Russia	18.66			18.66	Q
6	Nadzeya Astapchuk	Belarus	18.57			18.57	Q
7	Astrid Kumbernuss	Germany	18.46			18.46	Q
8	Assunta Legnante	Italy	X	17.55	18.35	18.35	q, SB
9	Lieja Tunks	Netherlands	X	X	18.31	18.31	
10	Li Meiju	China	18.13	X	X	18.13	
11	Cristiana Checchi	Italy	X	17.72	18.08	18.08	
12	Song Feina	China	X	17.23	17.04	17.23	
	Nadine Kleinert	Germany	X	X	X	NM	

=== Final ===
Rank	Athlete	Nationality	#1	#2	#3	#4	#5	#6	Result	Notes
1st place, gold medalist(s)	Irina Korzhanenko	Russia	20.14	20.55	X	X	X	19.86	20.55	CR
2nd place, silver medalist(s)	Nadzeya Astapchuk	Belarus	19.49	20.31	19.99	19.77	20.09	19.69	20.31	
3rd place, bronze medalist(s)	Astrid Kumbernuss	Germany	19.05	19.86	19.78	X	X	19.59	19.86	SB
4	Vita Pavlysh	Ukraine	19.16	X	19.66	19.08	X	19.73	19.73	
5	Svetlana Krivelyova	Russia	18.72	18.64	X	19.45	19.57	19.44	19.57	
6	Yumileidi Cumbá	Cuba	X	19.19	X	X	18.24	18.80	19.19	PB
7	Yanina Karolchyk-Pravalinskaya	Belarus	18.94	X	18.91	18.83	X	X	18.94	
8	Assunta Legnante	Italy	X	18.20	X	X	X	X	18.20	
