= 2001 IAAF World Indoor Championships – Women's shot put =

The women's shot put event at the 2001 IAAF World Indoor Championships was held on March 10.

== Results ==
Rank	Athlete	Nationality	#1	#2	#3	#4	#5	#6	Result	Notes
1st place, gold medalist(s)	Larisa Peleshenko	Russia	18.87	19.15	19.52	X	19.51	19.84	19.84	
2nd place, silver medalist(s)	Nadzeya Astapchuk	Belarus	19.02	19.07	19.24	X	19.23	X	19.24	PB
3rd place, bronze medalist(s)	Svetlana Krivelyova	Russia	18.88	X	19.18	X	18.85	X	19.18	
4	Nadine Kleinert	Germany	17.69	18.54	18.87	X	X	X	18.87	
5	Yumileidi Cumbá	Cuba	18.19	18.61	X	18.56	X	X	18.61	
6	Katarzyna Żakowicz	Poland	18.59	17.75	18.59	X	18.34	18.40	18.59	PB
7	Cheng Xiaoyan	China	18.22	X	17.84	X	17.65	17.51	18.22	
8	Krystyna Zabawska	Poland	16.91	17.98	18.00	X	17.17	18.12	18.12	SB
9	Yanina Karolchyk	Belarus	17.52	17.38	X				17.52	SB
10	Connie Price-Smith	United States	17.09	17.41	X				17.41	
11	Lee Myung-Sun	South Korea	17.09	X	17.07				17.09	
12	Yu Xin	China	14.55	X	X				14.55	
