= Athletics at the 1999 Summer Universiade – Women's shot put =

The women's shot put event at the 1999 Summer Universiade was held at the Estadio Son Moix in Palma de Mallorca, Spain on 8 July.

== Results ==
Rank	Athlete	Nationality	#1	#2	#3	#4	#5	#6	Result	Notes
1st place, gold medalist(s)	Yumileidi Cumbá	Cuba	18.70	18.10	x	x	18.59	18.38	18.70	
2nd place, silver medalist(s)	Song Feina	China							18.28	
3rd place, bronze medalist(s)	Elisângela Adriano	Brazil							18.17	
4	Jesseca Cross	United States							18.10	
5	Tressa Thompson	United States							18.04	
6	Martina de la Puente	Spain							18.01	
7	Katarzyna Żakowicz	Poland							17.89	
8	Maranelle du Toit	South Africa							15.77	
9	Linda Nestorsson	Sweden							15.06	
10	Marianne Berndt	Chile							15.02	
11	Helena Engman	Sweden							14.95	
12	Karella Aguarto	Peru							12.78	
13	Henriette Jensen	Denmark							12.25	
	Peace Isidrmo	Nigeria							DNS	
