= 1999 World Championships in Athletics – Women's shot put =

These are the official results of the Women's Shot Put event at the 1999 World Championships in Seville, Spain. There were a total number of 26 participating athletes, with the final held on Wednesday 25 August 1999.

== Medalists ==
Gold	Astrid Kumbernuss; Germany (GER)
Silver	Nadine Kleinert; Germany (GER)
Bronze	Svetlana Krivelyova; Russia (RUS)

== Schedule ==
- All times are Central European Time (UTC+1)

Qualification Round
Group A	Group B
25.08.1999 – 10:30h	25.08.1999 – 10:30h
Final Round
25.08.1999 – 20:15h

== Abbreviations ==
- All results shown are in metres

Q	automatic qualification
q	qualification by rank
DNS	did not start
NM	no mark
WR	world record
AR	area record
NR	national record
PB	personal best
SB	season best

== Startlist ==
Order	№	Athlete	Season Best	Personal Best
GROUP A
1	546	Mara Rosolen (ITA)	18.46	18.61
2	424	Astrid Kumbernuss (GER)	19.76	21.22
3	964	Svetla Mitkova-Sınırtaş (TUR)	17.76	20.91
4	948	Juttaporn Krasaeyan (THA)	16.43	19.43
5	741	Krystyna Danilczyk-Zabawska (POL)	19.26	19.42
6	351	Laurence Manfredi (FRA)	17.85	17.85
7	790	Elena Hila (ROM)	18.73	18.73
8	213	Yumileidi Cumbá (CUB)	19.29	19.29
9	1037	Connie Price-Smith (USA)	19.46	19.60
10	166	Song Feina (CHN)	18.43	18.45
11	90	Yanina Korolchik (BLR)	18.87	19.23
12	155	Cheng Xiaoyan (CHN)	18.91	20.02
13	859	Anna Romanova (RUS)	18.84	20.24
GROUP B
1	422	Nadine Kleinert (GER)	19.52	19.52
2	843	Svetlana Krivelyova (RUS)	20.69	21.06
3	1042	Teri Steer-Tunks (USA)	19.04	19.04
4	718	Vivian Peters-Chukwuemeka (NGR)	17.35	17.35
5	49	Valentina Fedyushina (AUT)	19.21	21.60
6	1046	Tressa Thompson (USA)	19.44	19.44
7	571	Nada Kawar (JOR)	17.74	17.79
8	172	Yu Juan (CHN)	18.74	19.13
9	609	Lee Myung-Sun (KOR)	18.79	18.79
10	92	Nadzeya Astapchuk (BLR)	18.73	18.73
11	463	Kalliopi Ouzouni (GRE)	18.39	18.39
12	703	Lieja Koeman (NED)	18.48	18.48
13	260	Martina de la Puente (ESP)	18.17	18.17

== Records ==
Standing records prior to the 1999 World Athletics Championships
World Record	Natalya Lisovskaya (URS)	22.63 m	June 7, 1987	Moscow, Soviet Union
Event Record	Natalya Lisovskaya (URS)	21.24 m	September 5, 1987	Rome, Italy

== Qualification ==
=== Group A ===
Rank	Overall	Athlete	Attempts			Distance	Note
Rank	Overall	Athlete	1	2	3	Distance	Note
1	2	Astrid Kumbernuss (GER)	18.84	—		18.84 m	
2	3	Cheng Xiaoyan (CHN)	18.49	18.62	—	18.62 m	
3	5	Krystyna Danilczyk-Zabawska (POL)	18.49	X	—	18.49 m	
4	6	Yumileidi Cumbá (CUB)	18.27	18.38	X	18.38 m	
5	9	Connie Price-Smith (USA)	17.78	18.10	18.06	18.10 m	
6	10	Elena Hila (ROM)	17.15	17.37	18.09	18.09 m	
7	12	Yanina Korolchik (BLR)	16.72	16.86	17.90	17.90 m	
8	13	Laurence Manfredi (FRA)	17.80	17.25	17.89	17.89 m	NR
9	14	Mara Rosolen (ITA)	17.84	17.09	16.91	17.84 m	
10	17	Anna Romanova (RUS)	17.54	17.78	X	17.78 m	
11	21	Juttaporn Krasaeyan (THA)	17.12	17.39	17.11	17.39 m	SB
12	22	Song Feina (CHN)	16.86	17.26	17.25	17.26 m	
13	24	Svetla Mitkova-Sınırtaş (TUR)	16.23	16.14	16.40	16.40 m	

=== Group B ===
Rank	Overall	Athlete	Attempts			Distance	Note
Rank	Overall	Athlete	1	2	3	Distance	Note
1	1	Svetlana Krivelyova (RUS)	18.25	19.54	—	19.54 m	
2	4	Nadine Kleinert (GER)	18.59	—	—	18.59 m	
3	7	Lee Myung-Sun (KOR)	17.63	18.37	X	18.37 m	
4	8	Valentina Fedyushina (AUT)	18.28	18.24	18.23	18.28 m	
5	11	Teri Steer-Tunks (USA)	17.43	18.09	X	18.09 m	
6	15	Yu Juan (CHN)	17.82	17.27	17.07	17.82 m	
7	16	Kalliopi Ouzouni (GRE)	17.43	17.79	17.23	17.79 m	
8	18	Tressa Thompson (USA)	17.47	17.27	17.52	17.52 m	
9	19	Nadzeya Astapchuk (BLR)	17.37	X	17.47	17.47 m	
10	20	Lieja Koeman (NED)	X	17.45	17.18	17.45 m	
11	23	Martina de la Puente (ESP)	X	X	16.68	16.68 m	
12	25	Nada Kawar (JOR)	16.30	X	X	16.30 m	
—	—	Vivian Peters-Chukwuemeka (NGR)	—	—	—	DNS	

== Final ==
Rank	Athlete	Attempts						Distance	Note
Rank	Athlete	1	2	3	4	5	6	Distance	Note
1st place, gold medalist(s)	Astrid Kumbernuss (GER)	18.84	19.34	19.59	19.62	19.85	19.84	19.85 m	SB
2nd place, silver medalist(s)	Nadine Kleinert (GER)	19.14	18.98	18.63	19.43	19.61	19.19	19.61 m	PB
3rd place, bronze medalist(s)	Svetlana Krivelyova (RUS)	18.92	19.22	X	19.43	19.35	19.34	19.43 m	
4	Yanina Korolchik (BLR)	18.08	18.61	X	17.98	19.17	X	19.17 m	SB
5	Cheng Xiaoyan (CHN)	18.67	18.50	18.23	X	X	18.49	18.67 m	
6	Yumileidi Cumbá (CUB)	18.25	X	18.44	17.96	X	17.96	18.44 m	
7	Valentina Fedyushina (AUT)	18.05	18.17	X	X	17.97	18.15	18.17 m	
8	Krystyna Danilczyk-Zabawska (POL)	X	X	18.12	18.03	X	X	18.12 m	
9	Teri Steer-Tunks (USA)	18.04	17.54	17.83				18.04 m	
10	Lee Myung-Sun (KOR)	17.75	X	17.92				17.92 m	
11	Connie Price-Smith (USA)	17.50	X	17.89				17.89 m	
12	Elena Hila (ROM)	17.38	17.88	X				17.88 m	
