= 2007 World Championships in Athletics – Women's shot put =

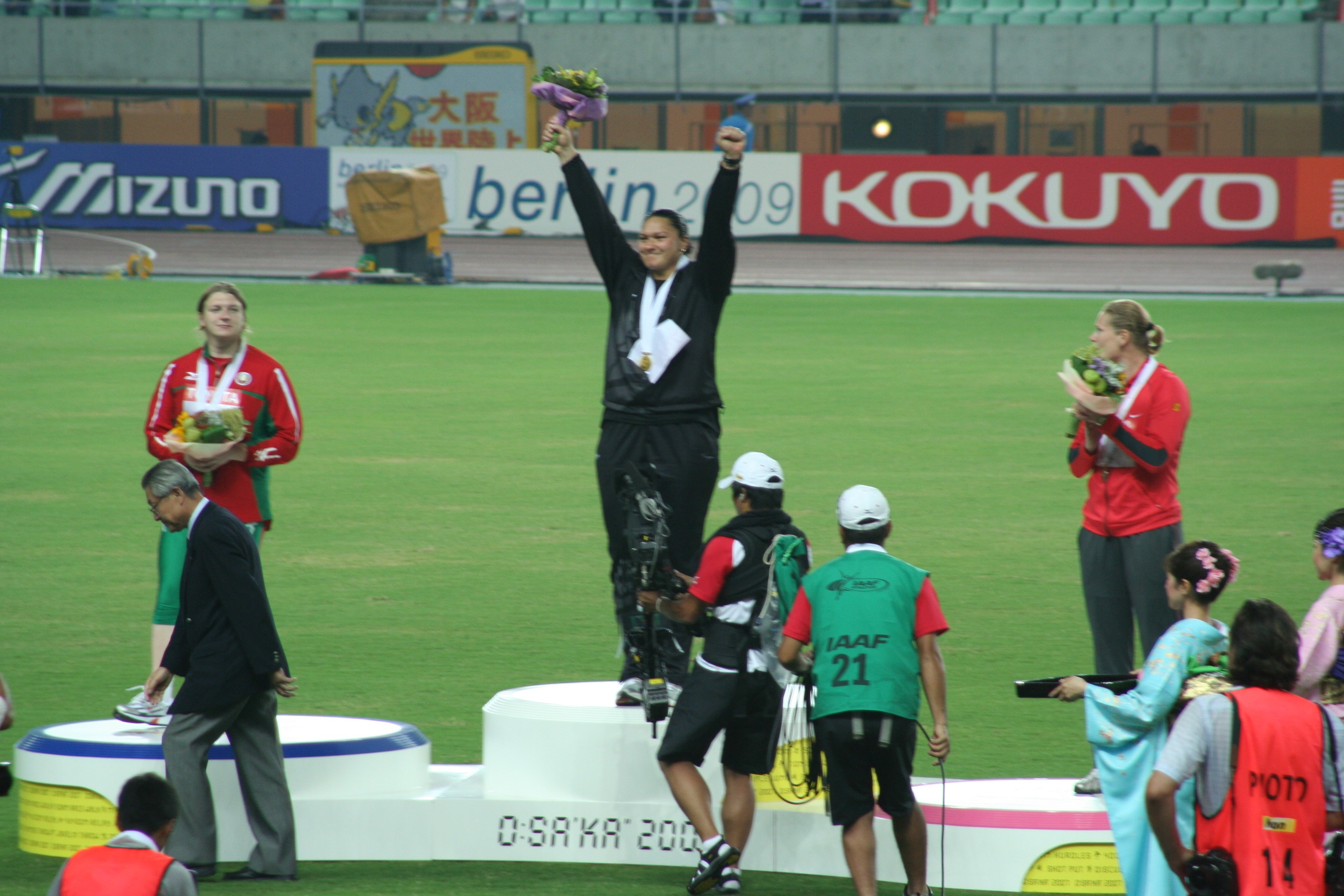
Victory ceremony

The women's shot put event at the 2007 World Championships in Athletics took place on August 26, 2007 at the Nagai Stadium in Osaka, Japan.

== Medallists ==
Gold	Valerie Vili; New Zealand (NZL)
Silver	Nadine Kleinert; Germany (GER)
Bronze	Li Ling; China (CHN)

== Abbreviations ==
- All results shown are in metres

Q	automatic qualification
q	qualification by rank
DNS	did not start
NM	no mark
WR	world record
WL	world leading
AR	area record
NR	national record
PB	personal best
SB	season best

== Records ==
Standing records prior to the 2007 World Athletics Championships
World Record	Natalya Lisovskaya (URS)	22.63 m	June 7, 1987	Moscow, Soviet Union
Event Record	Natalya Lisovskaya (URS)	21.24 m	September 5, 1987	Rome, Italy

== Qualification ==
=== Group A ===
Place	Athlete	Nation	1	2	3	Time	Notes
1	Valerie Vili	New Zealand	19.45			19.45	Q
2	Li Meiju	China	19.05			19.05	Q
3	Chiara Rosa	Italy	18.77			18.77	Q
4	Li Ling	China	18.76			18.76	Q
5	Petra Lammert	Germany	18.72			18.72	Q
6	Yanina Karolchyk-Pravalinskaya	Belarus	17.34	18.52		18.52	Q
7	Yumileidi Cumbá	Cuba	18.17	18.22	18.29	18.29	q
8	Anna Avdeyeva	Russia	17.52	17.42	18.19	18.19	
9	Helena Engman	Sweden	X	15.27	17.50	17.50	
10	Kristin Heaston	United States	17.14	X	17.40	17.40	
11	Elisângela Adriano	Brazil	16.92	X	17.07	17.07	
12	Sarah Stevens	United States	16.87	X	16.26	16.87	
13	Ana Pouhila	Tonga	16.41	16.61	16.62	16.62	
14	Lin Chia-Ying	Chinese Taipei	16.05	16.20	16.41	16.41	

=== Group B ===
Place	Athlete	Nation	1	2	3	Time	Notes
1	Nadine Kleinert	Germany	19.17			19.17	Q
2	Anna Omarova	Russia	18.85			18.85	Q
3	Gong Lijiao	China	X	18.20	18.38	18.38	Q
4	Misleydis González	Cuba	18.28	18.17	18.05	18.28	q
5	Nadzeya Astapchuk	Belarus	18.23	X	18.11	18.23	q
6	Assunta Legnante	Italy	17.26	17.86	18.19	18.19	
7	Oksana Gaus	Russia	17.58	17.65	17.20	17.65	
8	Cleopatra Borel-Brown	Trinidad and Tobago	16.76	17.29	X	17.29	
9	Yoko Toyonaga	Japan	16.34	16.52	17.02	17.02	SB
10	Jillian Camarena	United States	16.95	X	16.89	16.95	
11	Irache Quintanal	Spain	16.53	X	16.32	16.53	
12	Anca Heltne	Romania	16.19	16.27	X	16.27	
13	Iolanta Ulyeva	Kazakhstan	15.49	15.52	15.01	15.52	
—	Vivian Chukwuemeka	Nigeria	X	X	X	NM	

== Final ==
Rank	Athlete	Nation	Attempts						Result	Note
Rank	Athlete	Nation	1	2	3	4	5	6	Result	Note
1st place, gold medalist(s)	Valerie Vili	New Zealand	19.89	19.74	19.80	X	19.95	20.54	20.54 m	WL
2nd place, silver medalist(s)	Nadine Kleinert	Germany	18.75	19.45	19.04	X	19.77	19.72	19.77 m	SB
3rd place, bronze medalist(s)	Li Ling	China	18.21	18.88	X	18.92	X	19.38	19.38 m	PB
4	Petra Lammert	Germany	19.33	X	19.27	18.86	18.92	X	19.33 m	
5	Li Meiju	China	17.29	18.79	18.83	18.32	18.77	18.62	18.83 m	
6	Gong Lijiao	China	17.82	18.66	X	18.34	X	X	18.66 m	
7	Chiara Rosa	Italy	X	18.35	18.17	18.39	X	X	18.39 m	
8	Anna Omarova	Russia	18.20	X	X				18.20 m	
9	Yanina Karolchyk-Pravalinskaya	Belarus	X	18.17	X				18.17 m	
10	Misleydis González	Cuba	17.36	18.14	17.87				18.14 m	
11	Yumileidi Cumbá	Cuba	X	17.93	17.83				17.93 m	
—	Nadezhda Ostapchuk	Belarus	~~20.04~~	~~X~~	~~19.17~~	~~X~~	~~X~~	~~20.48~~	~~20.48 m~~	DQ
