= 1992 World Junior Championships in Athletics – Women's shot put =

The women's shot put event at the 1992 World Junior Championships in Athletics was held in Seoul, South Korea, at Olympic Stadium on 16 and 17 September.

== Medalists ==
Gold	Wang Yawen; China
Silver	Zhang Zhiying; China
Bronze	Olga Ilyina; Commonwealth of Independent States

== Results ==
=== Final ===
17 September

Rank	Name	Nationality	Attempts						Result	Notes
Rank	Name	Nationality	1	2	3	4	5	6	Result	Notes
1st place, gold medalist(s)	Wang Yawen	China	18.05	17.36	18.02	17.40	17.53	17.64	18.05	
2nd place, silver medalist(s)	Zhang Zhiying	China	17.15	18.03	13.59	16.52	16.95	16.31	18.03	
3rd place, bronze medalist(s)	Olga Ilyina	Commonwealth of Independent States	16.72	16.65	16.60	x	17.20	16.51	17.20	
4	Yumileidi Cumbá	Cuba	x	16.88	16.90	16.45	15.82	17.06	17.06	
5	Danijela Čurović	FR Yugoslavia	15.95	x	15.51	16.25	16.00	16.35	16.35	
6	Claudia Mues	Germany	14.97	x	15.41	15.22	x	14.90	15.41	
7	Oksana Chernykh	Commonwealth of Independent States	14.62	15.24	15.00	15.39	15.26	15.00	15.39	
8	Lee Myeong-Seon	South Korea	15.28	15.29	15.33	14.38	14.96	14.53	15.33	
9	Marika Tuliniemi	Finland	x	15.10	13.23				15.10	
10	Ekateríni Lemonidou	Greece	14.22	14.45	14.07				14.45	
11	Alison Grey	United Kingdom	x	13.84	14.20				14.20	
12	Nadine Kleinert	Germany	13.84	14.10	x				14.10	

=== Qualifications ===
16 Sep

==== Group A ====
Rank	Name	Nationality	Attempts			Result	Notes
Rank	Name	Nationality	1	2	3	Result	Notes
1	Zhang Zhiying	China	16.88	-	-	16.88	Q
2	Marika Tuliniemi	Finland	16.16	-	-	16.16	Q
3	Danijela Čurović	FR Yugoslavia	15.30	-	-	15.30	Q
4	Oksana Chernykh	Commonwealth of Independent States	15.15	-	-	15.15	Q
5	Claudia Mues	Germany	x	14.79	15.12	15.12	Q
6	Ekateríni Lemonidou	Greece	13.81	14.28	14.74	14.74	q
7	Rita Lora	Spain	13.28	x	14.59	14.59	
8	Miyoko Nakanishi	Japan	13.25	12.61	13.08	13.25	
9	Wenche Kristensen	Norway	x	12.55	13.25	13.25	
10	Melinda Wirtz	United States	12.11	12.28	12.98	12.98	
	Kim Jung-Min	South Korea	x	x	x	NM	

==== Group B ====
Rank	Name	Nationality	Attempts			Result	Notes
Rank	Name	Nationality	1	2	3	Result	Notes
1	Wang Yawen	China	17.80	-	-	17.80	Q
2	Olga Ilyina	Commonwealth of Independent States	16.15	-	-	16.15	Q
3	Yumileidi Cumbá	Cuba	x	16.12	-	16.12	Q
4	Lee Myeong-Seon	South Korea	15.35	-	-	15.35	Q
5	Alison Grey	United Kingdom	13.75	15.25	-	15.25	Q
6	Nadine Kleinert	Germany	14.90	14.89	14.20	14.90	q
7	Beatrice Faumuina	New Zealand	12.83	14.58	14.30	14.58	
8	Petra Jurášková	Czechoslovakia	14.05	13.57	14.55	14.55	
9	Michelle Haage	Australia	14.11	13.36	13.46	14.11	
10	Kristin Heaston	United States	13.49	14.00	13.68	14.00	
11	Sunisa Yooyao	Thailand	13.33	13.50	13.49	13.50	

== Participation ==
According to an unofficial count, 22 athletes from 17 countries participated in the event.

- Australia (1)
- China (2)
- Commonwealth of Independent States (2)
- Cuba (1)
- Czechoslovakia (1)
- Finland (1)
- Germany (2)
- Greece (1)
- Japan (1)
- New Zealand (1)
- Norway (1)
- South Korea (2)
- Spain (1)
- Thailand (1)
- United Kingdom (1)
- United States (2)
- FR Yugoslavia (1)
