= 1999 IAAF World Indoor Championships – Women's shot put =

The women's shot put event at the 1999 IAAF World Indoor Championships was held on March 6.

== Results ==
Rank	Athlete	Nationality	#1	#2	#3	#4	#5	#6	Result	Notes
1st place, gold medalist(s)	Svetlana Krivelyova	Russia	18.16	x	19.08	18.52	18.87	x	19.08	
2nd place, silver medalist(s)	Krystyna Danilczyk-Zabawska	Poland	x	19.00	x	18.53	x	18.28	19.00	
3rd place, bronze medalist(s)	Teri Steer-Tunks	United States	17.56	18.86	18.72	x	18.84	x	18.86	
4	Connie Price-Smith	United States	18.48	x	18.82	x	18.43	18.47	18.82	SB
5	Nadine Kleinert	Germany	18.33	x	18.17	18.42	18.51	18.39	18.51	
6	Yumileidi Cumbá	Cuba	x	17.29	17.73	x	x	17.80	17.80	
7	Li Meisu	China	16.41	16.63	x				16.63	
8	Yoko Toyonaga	Japan	15.55	15.39	15.73				15.73	
	Vita Pavlysh	Ukraine							DQ	*
	Irina Korzhanenko	Russia							DQ	*

* Vita Pavlysh and Irina Korzhanenko originally won gold and silver respectively but were later disqualified for doping.
