= 2007 European Athletics Indoor Championships – Women's shot put =

The Women's shot put event at the 2007 European Athletics Indoor Championships was held on March 3–4.

== Medalists ==
Gold	Silver	Bronze
Assunta Legnante; Italy	Irina Khudoroshkina; Russia	Olga Ryabinkina; Russia

== Results ==
=== Qualification ===
Qualifying perf. 18.00 (Q) or 8 best performers (q) advanced to the Final.

Rank	Athlete	Nationality	#1	#2	#3	Result	Note
1	Olga Ryabinkina	Russia	18.21			18.21	Q
2	Assunta Legnante	Italy	X	17.46	18.20	18.20	Q
3	Yulia Leantsiuk	Belarus	15.78	18.01		18.01	Q
4	Anna Omarova	Russia	17.96	X	X	17.96	q
5	Irina Khudoroshkina	Russia	17.41	17.91	X	17.91	q
6	Laurence Manfrédi	France	17.63	17.43	17.63	17.63	q
7	Helena Engman	Sweden	16.53	17.16	X	17.16	q
8	Jessica Cérival	France	16.78	16.71	16.73	16.78	q
9	Magdalena Sobieszek	Poland	16.11	X	16.55	16.55	
10	Chiara Rosa	Italy	15.77	16.54	16.10	16.54	
11	Yanina Pravalinskay-Karolchyk	Belarus	15.89	16.29	16.51	16.51	
12	Irache Quintanal	Spain	X	15.77	16.00	16.00	
13	Anca Heltne	Romania	15.47	X	15.88	15.88	

=== Final ===
Rank	Athlete	Nationality	#1	#2	#3	#4	#5	#6	Result	Note
1st place, gold medalist(s)	Assunta Legnante	Italy	17.05	18.71	18.92	X	X	18.34	18.92	
2nd place, silver medalist(s)	Irina Khudoroshkina	Russia	17.93	17.99	X	17.80	18.50	X	18.50	
3rd place, bronze medalist(s)	Olga Ryabinkina	Russia	X	17.72	18.00	18.01	18.16	X	18.16	
4	Yulia Leantsiuk	Belarus	X	18.10	17.95	X	X	17.34	18.10	
5	Laurence Manfrédi	France	17.41	17.94	17.56	X	17.77	18.02	18.02	SB
6	Anna Omarova	Russia	17.25	17.98	17.25	17.87	17.83	17.01	17.98	
7	Jessica Cérival	France	X	15.87	16.08	16.46	X	16.51	16.51	
8	Helena Engman	Sweden	X	15.63	15.70	15.58	15.75	16.09	16.09	
