= Jessica Cross =

Jessica Cross is the name of:

- Jessie Cross (1909–2011), American athlete at the 1928 Summer Olympics
- Jesseca Cross (born 1975), American athlete at the 2000 Summer Olympics
