= 2006 IAAF World Indoor Championships – Women's shot put =

The Women's shot put event at the 2006 IAAF World Indoor Championships was held on March 11–12.

== Medalists ==
Gold	Silver	Bronze
Natallia Mikhnevich; Belarus	Nadine Kleinert; Germany	Olga Ryabinkina; Russia

== Results ==
=== Qualification ===
Qualifying perf. 18.20 (Q) or 8 best performers (q) advanced to the Final.

Rank	Athlete	Nationality	#1	#2	#3	Result	Notes
1	Natallia Mikhnevich	Belarus	19.33			19.33	Q
2	Olga Ryabinkina	Russia	19.01			19.01	Q
	Nadzeya Ostapchuk	Belarus	~~18.98~~			~~18.98~~	DQ
3	Yumileidi Cumbá	Cuba	18.13	X	18.73	18.73	Q, SB
4	Nadine Kleinert	Germany	18.57			18.57	Q
5	Jillian Camarena	United States	16.23	X	18.25	18.25	Q
6	Petra Lammert	Germany	16.93	17.32	18.24	18.24	Q
7	Cleopatra Borel-Brown	Trinidad and Tobago	17.92	17.82	X	17.92	q
8	Chiara Rosa	Italy	17.70	17.51	17.85	17.85	
9	Kristin Heaston	United States	17.07	17.83	X	17.83	
10	Krystyna Zabawska	Poland	17.50	X	17.53	17.53	
11	Olga Ivanova	Russia	16.89	17.50	X	17.50	
12	Li Ling	China	16.94	15.73	X	16.94	

=== Final ===
Rank	Athlete	Nationality	#1	#2	#3	#4	#5	#6	Result	Notes
1st place, gold medalist(s)	Natallia Mikhnevich	Belarus	19.00	19.84	X	X	19.28	19.36	19.84	PB
2nd place, silver medalist(s)	Nadine Kleinert	Germany	19.26	19.64	19.32	19.09	19.35	X	19.64	PB
3rd place, bronze medalist(s)	Olga Ryabinkina	Russia	18.96	18.95	19.24	X	X	X	19.24	SB
4	Petra Lammert	Germany	18.92	19.21	18.75	18.97	18.81	18.81	19.21	
5	Yumileidi Cumbá	Cuba	18.28	X	X	X	X	X	18.28	
	Nadzeya Ostapchuk	Belarus	~~X~~	~~X~~	~~17.93~~	~~X~~	~~X~~	~~18.13~~	~~18.13~~	DQ
6	Jillian Camarena	United States	X	X	17.15	17.60	X	X	17.60	
7	Cleopatra Borel-Brown	Trinidad and Tobago	17.00	17.38	X	17.59	X	17.52	17.59	
