= Olga Ryabinkina =

Russian shot putter (born 1976)

Olga Sergeyevna Ryabinkina (Russian: Ольга Серге́евна Рябинкина; born 24 September 1976 in Bryansk) is a female shot putter from Russia.

She finished tenth at the 2000 Summer Olympics. At the 2004 Summer Olympics she failed to progress from the initial round.

In 2005, she achieved a personal best throw with 19.65 metres and won bronze at the European Indoor Championships and silver at the World Championships. Eight years later she was pronounced 2005 World champion when a retest of Nadzeya Astapchuk's doping sample revealed that she had been doping.

In 2006, she won the bronze medal at the World Indoor Championships, finished fourth at the 2006 European Athletics Championships and second at the World Cup, the latter in a season best of 19.54 metres.

== International competitions ==
Representing Russia
Year	Competition	Venue	Position	Event	Result	Notes
1994	World Junior Championships	Lisbon, Portugal	9th	Shot put	15.31 m	
1995	European Junior Championships	Nyíregyháza, Hungary	3rd	Shot put	16.55 m	
1997	European U23 Championships	Turku, Finland	4th	Shot put	17.56 m	
1997	European U23 Championships	Turku, Finland	4th	Discus throw	56.06 m	
2000	Olympic Games	Sydney, Australia	10th	Shot put	17.85 m	
2003	World Championships	Paris, France	16th (q)	Shot put	17.74 m	
2004	Olympic Games	Athens, Greece	12th (q)	Shot put	18.00 m	
2005	European Indoor Championships	Madrid, Spain	3rd	Shot put	18.83 m	
2005	World Championships	Helsinki, Finland	1st	Shot put	19.64 m	
2006	World Indoor Championships	Moscow, Russia	3rd	Shot put	19.24 m	
2006	European Championships	Gothenburg, Sweden	4th	Shot put	19.02 m	
2007	European Indoor Championships	Birmingham, United Kingdom	3rd	Shot put	18.16 m	

== See also ==
- List of World Athletics Championships medalists (women)
- List of IAAF World Indoor Championships medalists (women)
- List of European Athletics Championships medalists (women)
- List of European Athletics Indoor Championships medalists (women)
