= 1998 European Athletics Championships – Women's shot put =

Women's shot put at the European Athletics Championships

The women's shot put at the 1998 European Athletics Championships was held at the Népstadion on 18 and 20 August.

== Medalists ==
Gold	Vita Pavlysh; Ukraine
Silver	Irina Korzhanenko; Russia
Bronze	Yanina Karolchyk; Belarus

== Results ==
KEY:	q	Better non-qualifiers	Q	Qualified	NR	National record	PB	Personal best	SB	Seasonal best

=== Qualification ===
Qualification: Qualification Performance 18.00 (Q) or at least 12 best performers advance to the final.

Rank	Group	Athlete	Nationality	#1	#2	#3	Result	Notes
1	A	Vita Pavlysh	Ukraine	19.99			19.99	Q
2	B	Irina Korzhanenko	Russia				19.18	Q
3	A	Svetlana Krivelyova	Russia	17.98	x	18.55	18.55	Q
4	A	Nadine Kleinert	Germany				18.38	Q
5	B	Corrie de Bruin	Netherlands				18.36	Q
6	B	Stephanie Storp	Germany				18.08	Q
7	A	Lieja Koeman	Netherlands				18.01	Q, PB
7	B	Katarzyna Żakowicz	Poland				18.01	Q
7	B	Tatyana Khorkhulyova	Belarus				18.01	Q
10	A	Yanina Karolchyk	Belarus				18.00	Q
11	A	Krystyna Zabawska	Poland				17.80	q
12	B	Karoliina Lundahl	Finland				17.68	q
13	A	Danijela Curović	Yugoslavia				17.50	
14	A	Mara Rosolen	Italy				17.08	
15	B	Katarina Sederholm	Norway				16.83	
16	B	Linda-Marie Mårtensson	Sweden				16.79	
17	B	Nataša Erjavec	Slovenia				16.43	
18	A	Margarita Ramos	Spain	16.41	16.29	16.37	16.41	

=== Final ===
Rank	Athlete	Nationality	#1	#2	#3	#4	#5	#6	Result	Notes
1st place, gold medalist(s)	Vita Pavlysh	Ukraine	20.65	21.69	20.46	20.80	20.56	20.91	21.69	CR
2nd place, silver medalist(s)	Irina Korzhanenko	Russia	19.33	x	19.71	19.41	x	19.49	19.71	
3rd place, bronze medalist(s)	Yanina Karolchyk	Belarus	17.55	18.24	18.31	18.15	18.24	19.23	19.23	PB
4	Svetlana Krivelyova	Russia	18.06	18.31	18.08	18.19	18.52	19.08	19.08	
5	Katarzyna Żakowicz	Poland	18.24	x	x	17.76	17.89	18.77	18.77	PB
6	Nadine Kleinert	Germany	x	17.85	18.48	17.85	x	18.44	18.48	
7	Corrie de Bruin	Netherlands	18.17	18.03	18.20	18.28	x	x	18.28	
8	Tatyana Khorkhulyova	Belarus	18.17	17.95	17.46	18.10	x	x	18.17	
9	Stephanie Storp	Germany	18.14	17.98	18.16				18.16	
10	Lieja Koeman	Netherlands	17.71	17.82	17.99				17.99	
11	Krystyna Zabawska	Poland	17.31	x	17.69				17.69	
12	Karoliina Lundahl	Finland	17.33	x	17.03				17.33	
