= 2000 European Athletics Indoor Championships – Women's shot put =

The women's shot put event at the 2000 European Athletics Indoor Championships was held on February 25–26.

== Medalists ==
Gold	Silver	Bronze
Larisa Peleshenko; Russia	Nadine Kleinert-Schmitt; Germany	Astrid Kumbernuss; Germany

== Results ==
=== Qualification ===
Qualifying perf. 18.60 (Q) or 8 best performers (q) advanced to the Final.

Rank	Athlete	Nationality	#1	#2	#3	Result	Note
1	Larisa Peleshenko	Russia	19.08			19.08	Q
2	Krystyna Danilczyk	Poland	18.47	18.69		18.69	Q
3	Astrid Kumbernuss	Germany	18.67			18.67	Q
4	Svetlana Krivelyova	Russia	18.51	18.46	18.07	18.51	q
5	Nadine Kleinert-Schmitt	Germany	18.41	18.23	18.21	18.41	q
6	Lyudmila Sechko	Russia	18.13	17.49	16.07	18.13	q
7	Lieja Koeman	Netherlands	18.10	X	17.95	18.10	q
8	Nadzeya Astapchuk	Belarus	X	18.09	X	18.09	q
9	Valentina Fedyushina	Ukraine	X	17.90	16.44	17.90	
10	Svetla Sınırtaş	Turkey	17.70	17.36	17.20	17.70	
11	Laurence Manfredi	France	17.51	X	X	17.51	
12	Kalliopi Ouzouni	Greece	17.39	X	X	17.39	
13	Judy Oakes	Great Britain	17.25	X	X	17.25	
14	Livia Mehes	Romania	16.57	16.40	16.82	16.82	
15	Nadine Beckel	Germany	16.66	X	X	16.66	
16	Assunta Legnante	Italy	15.47	16.42	16.38	16.42	
17	Linda-Marie Mårtensson	Sweden	X	15.74	16.30	16.30	
	Mara Rosolen	Italy	X	X	X	NM	

=== Final ===
Rank	Athlete	Nationality	#1	#2	#3	#4	#5	#6	Result	Note
1st place, gold medalist(s)	Larisa Peleshenko	Russia	19.86	X	19.61	X	X	20.15	20.15	
2nd place, silver medalist(s)	Nadine Kleinert-Schmitt	Germany	18.76	18.95	18.86	19.23	19.08	X	19.23	
3rd place, bronze medalist(s)	Astrid Kumbernuss	Germany	19.03	19.12	X	X	X	X	19.12	
4	Svetlana Krivelyova	Russia	18.20	18.44	18.61	18.96	X	18.70	18.96	
5	Krystyna Danilczyk	Poland	X	18.88	X	X	X	18.21	18.88	
6	Nadzeya Astapchuk	Belarus	17.82	X	18.53	18.65	X	18.39	18.65	
7	Lieja Koeman	Netherlands	18.32	18.38	X	18.46	X	X	18.46	PB
8	Lyudmila Sechko	Russia	17.73	17.04	X	X	17.34	17.04	17.73	
