= Athletics at the 2001 Summer Universiade – Women's shot put =

The women's shot put event at the 2001 Summer Universiade was held at the Workers Stadium in Beijing, China on 28 August.

== Results ==
Rank	Athlete	Nationality	Result	Notes
1st place, gold medalist(s)	Yumileidi Cumbá	Cuba	18.90	
2nd place, silver medalist(s)	Lee Myung-Sun	South Korea	18.79	
3rd place, bronze medalist(s)	Katarzyna Żakowicz	Poland	18.31	
4	Cheng Xiaoyan	China	18.22	
5	Lieja Koeman	Netherlands	18.14	
6	Lucica Ciobanu	Romania	17.17	
7	Martina de la Puente	Spain	16.69	
8	Iolanta Ulyeva	Kazakhstan	16.42	
9	Lisa Griebel	United States	16.38	
10	Veronica Abrahamse	South Africa	16.18	
11	Assunta Legnante	Italy	16.16	
12	Elena Hila	Romania	16.01	
13	Kristin Heaston	United States	15.61	
14	Irini Terzoglou	Greece	15.55	
15	Irache Quintanal	Spain	14.83	
16	Marianne Berndt	Chile	14.59	
17	Tanya Sawyers	Canada	13.46	
	Oksana Zakharchuk	Ukraine	NM	
