= 2003 World Championships in Athletics – Women's shot put =

These are the official results of the Women's Shot Put event at the 2003 World Championships in Paris, France. There were a total number of 25 participating athletes, with the final held on Wednesday 27 August 2003. The qualification mark was set at 18.40 metres.

== Medalists ==
Gold	Svetlana Krivelyova; Russia (RUS)
Silver	Nadzeya Ostapchuk; Belarus (BLR)
Bronze	Vita Pavlysh; Ukraine (UKR)

== Schedule ==
- All times are Central European Time (UTC+1)

Qualification Round
Group A	Group B
27.08.2003 – 10:30h	27.08.2003 – 12:00h
Final Round
27.08.2003 – 18:55h

== Abbreviations ==
- All results shown are in metres

Q	automatic qualification
q	qualification by rank
DNS	did not start
NM	no mark
WR	world record
AR	area record
NR	national record
PB	personal best
SB	season best

== Records ==
Standing records prior to the 2003 World Athletics Championships
World Record	Natalya Lisovskaya (URS)	22.63 m	June 7, 1987	Moscow, Soviet Union
Event Record	Natalya Lisovskaya (URS)	21.24 m	September 5, 1987	Rome, Italy

== Qualification ==
=== Group A ===
Rank	Athlete	Throws			Result
Rank	Athlete	1	2	3	Result
1	Vita Pavlysh (UKR)	18.01	19.00	—	19.00 m
2	Nadine Kleinert (GER)	18.85	—	—	18.85 m
3	Irina Korzhanenko (RUS)	18.69	—	—	18.69 m
4	Krystyna Zabawska (POL)	18.46	—	—	18.46 m
5	Li Meiju (CHN)	18.04	18.23	X	18.23 m
6	Elisângela Adriano (BRA)	18.03	X	18.20	18.20 m
7	Yumileidi Cumbá (CUB)	X	17.95	X	17.95 m
8	Laurence Manfredi (FRA)	17.31	17.88	17.43	17.88 m
9	Vivian Chukwuemeka (NGR)	17.45	X	X	17.45 m
10	Nadine Beckel (GER)	17.30	17.42	17.25	17.42 m
11	Chinatsu Mori (JPN)	16.15	16.54	16.86	16.86 m
12	Kristin Heaston (USA)	15.25	16.70	X	16.70 m

=== Group B ===
Rank	Athlete	Throws			Result
Rank	Athlete	1	2	3	Result
1	Nadzeya Ostapchuk (BLR)	19.56	—	—	19.56 m
2	Valerie Vili (NZL)	18.23	18.77	—	18.77 m
3	Svetlana Krivelyova (RUS)	18.66	—	—	18.66 m
4	Lieja Tunks (NED)	18.14	18.44	—	18.44 m
5	Irini Terzoglou (GRE)	16.91	18.39	18.31	18.39 m
6	Assunta Legnante (ITA)	17.91	17.65	17.97	17.97 m
7	Astrid Kumbernuss (GER)	17.83	17.37	X	17.83 m
8	Olga Ryabinkina (RUS)	17.32	17.30	17.74	17.74 m
9	Elena Hila (ROU)	X	17.30	17.24	17.30 m
10	Zhang Xiaoyu (CHN)	X	16.55	16.82	16.82 m
11	Fior Vásquez (DOM)	15.51	X	16.52	16.52 m
12	Iolanta Ulyeva (KAZ)	X	16.32	16.29	16.32 m
13	Ana Pouhila (TGA)	X	14.96	X	14.96 m

== Final ==
Rank	Athlete	Throws						Result	Note
Rank	Athlete	1	2	3	4	5	6	Result	Note
1st place, gold medalist(s)	Svetlana Krivelyova (RUS)	19.60	19.97	20.30	20.63	20.03	20.12	20.63 m	
2nd place, silver medalist(s)	Nadzeya Ostapchuk (BLR)	18.46	19.56	X	19.45	20.12	X	20.12 m	PB
3rd place, bronze medalist(s)	Vita Pavlysh (UKR)	X	19.43	20.03	18.72	20.08	19.98	20.08 m	SB
4	Irina Korzhanenko (RUS)	X	19.12	19.17	X	X	X	19.17 m	
5	Valerie Vili (NZL)	18.55	18.65	17.82	X	X	17.85	18.65 m	
6	Krystyna Zabawska (POL)	18.32	X	18.62	X	18.23	18.49	18.62 m	
7	Nadine Kleinert (GER)	18.00	18.48	18.38	18.31	18.12	18.07	18.48 m	
8	Assunta Legnante (ITA)	17.48	X	18.28	17.99	17.70	18.08	18.28 m	
9	Elisângela Adriano (BRA)	17.27	18.11	X				18.11 m	
10	Lieja Tunks (NED)	X	X	17.99				17.99 m	
11	Li Meiju (CHN)	17.92	X	X				17.92 m	
12	Irini Terzoglou (GRE)	17.69	17.88	17.85				17.88 m	

== See also ==
- 2003 Shot Put Year Ranking
- Athletics at the 2003 Pan American Games - Women's shot put
