= 2006 European Athletics Championships – Women's shot put =

Women's shot put at the European Athletics Championships

The women's shot put at the 2006 European Athletics Championships were held at the Ullevi on August 11 and August 12.

Nadzeya Astapchuk had originally won the silver medal but later tested for doping and all her results between 13 August 2005 and 12 August 2007 were annulled.

== Medalists ==
Gold	Silver	Bronze
Natallia Kharaneka; Belarus	Petra Lammert; Germany	Olga Ryabinkina; Russia

== Schedule ==
Date	Time	Round
August 11, 2006	10:10	Qualification
August 12, 2006	13:35	Final

== Results ==
=== Qualification ===
Qualification: Qualifying Performance 17.75 (Q) or at least 12 best performers (q) advance to the final.

Rank	Athlete	Nationality	#1	#2	#3	Result	Notes
1	Nadine Kleinert	Germany	18.75			18.75	Q
2	Olga Ryabinkina	Russia	18.45			18.45	Q
3	Krystyna Zabawska	Poland	18.20			18.20	Q
4	Natallia Kharaneka	Belarus	18.14			18.14	Q
5	Chiara Rosa	Italy	18.05			18.05	Q
6	Petra Lammert	Germany	18.02			18.02	Q
7	Assunta Legnante	Italy	17.64	x	17.27	17.64	q
8	Irina Khudoroshkina	Russia	17.29	17.58	17.09	17.58	q
9	Magdalena Sobieszek	Poland	16.97	17.54	x	17.54	q, PB
10	Cristiana Checchi	Italy	x	17.48	x	17.48	q
11	Oksana Gaus	Russia	17.06	16.95	17.15	17.15	q
12	Laurence Manfredi	France	16.94	16.74	16.95	16.95	
13	Denise Kemkers	Netherlands	15.32	15.47	15.98	15.98	
14	Jana Kárníková	Czech Republic	15.69	x	15.79	15.79	
15	Filiz Kadoğan	Turkey	15.26	15.78	15.09	15.78	
16	Helena Engman	Sweden	15.60	x	15.60	15.60	
	~~Nadzeya Astapchuk~~	~~Belarus~~	~~x~~	~~17.90~~		~~17.90~~	DQ

=== Final ===
Rank	Athlete	Nationality	#1	#2	#3	#4	#5	#6	Result	Notes
1st place, gold medalist(s)	Natallia Kharaneka	Belarus	18.43	18.86	18.65	19.43	x	x	19.43	
2nd place, silver medalist(s)	Petra Lammert	Germany	18.45	19.06	18.26	x	18.31	19.17	19.17	
3rd place, bronze medalist(s)	Olga Ryabinkina	Russia	x	18.44	18.25	x	19.02	x	19.02	
4	Assunta Legnante	Italy	18.32	18.10	x	18.67	18.51	18.83	18.83	
5	Nadine Kleinert	Germany	18.47	18.36	x	18.14	x	x	18.47	
6	Irina Khudoroshkina	Russia	17.81	17.79	18.44	x	x	18.01	18.44	
7	Chiara Rosa	Italy	18.15	18.10	18.23	x	x	17.85	18.23	
8	Krystyna Zabawska	Poland	x	17.99	17.77				17.99	
9	Oksana Gaus	Russia	17.59	16.97	17.57				17.59	
10	Cristiana Checchi	Italy	x	17.42	x				17.42	
11	Magdalena Sobieszek	Poland	x	x	16.17				16.17	
	~~Nadzeya Astapchuk~~	~~Belarus~~	~~18.15~~	~~x~~	~~x~~	~~18.87~~	~~19.42~~	~~x~~	~~19.42~~	DQ
