= 2001 World Championships in Athletics – Women's shot put =

The Women's Shot Put event at the 2001 World Championships in Edmonton, Alberta, Canada was held on Sunday August 5, 2001. There were a total number of 20 participating athletes, with the qualification mark set at 18.40 metres.

== Medalists ==
Gold	Yanina Korolchik; Belarus (BLR)
Silver	Nadine Kleinert; Germany (GER)
Bronze	Vita Pavlysh; Ukraine (UKR)

== Schedule ==
- All times are Mountain Standard Time (UTC-7)

Qualification Round
Group A	Group B
05.08.2001 – 08:30h	05.08.2001 – 08:30h
Final Round
05.08.2001 – 15:45h

== Abbreviations ==
- All results shown are in metres

Q	automatic qualification
q	qualification by rank
DNS	did not start
NM	no mark
WR	world record
AR	area record
NR	national record
PB	personal best
SB	season best

== Records ==
Standing records prior to the 1999 World Athletics Championships
World Record	Natalya Lisovskaya (URS)	22.63 m	June 7, 1987	Moscow, Soviet Union
Event Record	Natalya Lisovskaya (URS)	21.24 m	September 5, 1987	Rome, Italy
Season Best	Larisa Peleshenko (RUS)	20.79 m	July 13, 2001	Tula, Russia

== Qualification ==
=== Group A ===
Rank	Overall	Athlete	Attempts			Distance	Note
Rank	Overall	Athlete	1	2	3	Distance	Note
1	1	Yanina Korolchik (BLR)	19.87	—	—	19.87 m	
2	4	Vita Pavlysh (UKR)	18.68	—	—	18.68 m	
3	6	Yumileidi Cumbá (CUB)	18.64	—	—	18.64 m	
4	7	Astrid Kumbernuss (GER)	17.98	18.54	—	18.54 m	
5	8	Krystyna Zabawska (POL)	18.28	X	18.48	18.48 m	
6	9	Svetlana Krivelyova (RUS)	18.47	—	—	18.47 m	
7	12	Lieja Koeman (NED)	17.93	X	17.82	17.93 m	
8	16	Kalliopi Ouzouni (GRE)	X	16.77	16.82	16.82 m	
9	18	Elena Hila (ROM)	X	16.57	X	16.57 m	
10	19	Iolanta Ulyeva (KAZ)	15.99	16.22	15.83	16.22 m	

=== Group B ===
Rank	Overall	Athlete	Attempts			Distance	Note
Rank	Overall	Athlete	1	2	3	Distance	Note
1	2	Nadine Kleinert (GER)	X	19.35	—	19.35 m	
2	3	Irina Korzhanenko (RUS)	18.96	—	—	18.96 m	
3	5	Larisa Peleshenko (RUS)	18.65	—	—	18.65 m	
4	10	Nadezhda Ostapchuk (BLR)	X	18.44	—	18.44 m	
5	11	Elisangela Adriano (BRA)	17.66	17.53	18.11	18.11 m	
6	13	Katarzyna Żakowicz (POL)	X	17.71	17.51	17.71 m	
7	14	Lee Myung-Sun (KOR)	17.66	17.52	17.55	17.66 m	
8	15	Cheng Xiaoyan (CHN)	17.21	17.32	17.25	17.32 m	
9	17	Seilala Sua (USA)	16.61	16.21	16.08	16.61 m	
10	20	Georgette Reed (CAN)	15.92	15.61	15.74	15.92 m	

== Final ==
Rank	Athlete	Attempts						Distance	Note
Rank	Athlete	1	2	3	4	5	6	Distance	Note
1st place, gold medalist(s)	Yanina Korolchik (BLR)	X	19.71	20.61	X	19.21	19.61	20.61 m	NR
2nd place, silver medalist(s)	Nadine Kleinert (GER)	19.54	18.88	19.45	19.10	X	19.86	19.86 m	PB
3rd place, bronze medalist(s)	Vita Pavlysh (UKR)	19.01	19.41	18.80	X	18.98	X	19.41 m	
4	Larisa Peleshenko (RUS)	X	19.06	19.37	19.32	19.30	19.15	19.37 m	
5	Irina Korzhanenko (RUS)	19.35	X	X	18.55	18.63	X	19.35 m	
6	Astrid Kumbernuss (GER)	18.77	19.02	18.91	X	19.25	X	19.25 m	
7	Nadezhda Ostapchuk (BLR)	18.65	18.81	18.52	18.71	18.98	X	18.98 m	
8	Yumileidi Cumbá (CUB)	18.73	X	18.34	X	17.90	18.56	18.73 m	
9	Svetlana Krivelyova (RUS)	X	18.68	18.70				18.70 m	
10	Krystyna Zabawska (POL)	18.18	18.49	18.50				18.50 m	
11	Elisangela Adriano (BRA)	18.06	17.96	17.95				18.06 m	
12	Lieja Koeman (NED)	17.56	17.89	X				17.89 m	

== See also ==
- 2001 Shot Put Year Ranking
- 2002 European Championships
