= Martina de la Puente =

Spanish shot putter

Martina de la Puente Piñera (born 4 April 1975 in Gijón, Asturias) is a retired female shot putter from Spain. She set her personal best of 18.17 metres in 1999 in Jerez de la Frontera.

== Achievements ==
Year	Competition	Venue	Position	Notes
Representing Spain
1993	European Junior Championships	San Sebastián, Spain	14th (q)	13.79 m
1994	World Junior Championships	Lisbon, Portugal	16th (q)	14.40 m
1995	Universiade	Fukuoka, Japan	6th	16.65 m
1996	European Indoor Championships	Stockholm, Sweden	6th	17.04 m
1997	European U23 Championships	Turku, Finland	7th	16.72 m
1997	Mediterranean Games	Bari, Italy	8th	16.70 m
1997	Universiade	Catania, Italy	7th	17.16 m
1998	European Indoor Championships	Valencia, Spain	17th	16.30 m
1999	Universiade	Palma de Mallorca, Spain	6th	18.01 m
1999	World Championships	Seville, Spain	23rd (q)	16.68 m
2000	Ibero-American Championships	Rio de Janeiro, Brazil	1st	17.44 m
2000	Olympic Games	Sydney, Australia	23rd (q)	16.30 m
2001	Universiade	Beijing, China	7th	16.69 m
2001	Mediterranean Games	Radès, Tunisia	3rd	16.55 m
2002	Ibero-American Championships	Guatemala City, Guatemala	2nd	17.20 m
2004	Ibero-American Championships	Huelva, Spain	5th	16.74 m
2005	European Indoor Championships	Madrid, Spain	11th (q)	16.28 m
2005	Mediterranean Games	Almería, Spain	4th	17.10 m
