= Athletics at the 2007 Pan American Games – Women's shot put =

Women's shot put at the Pan American Games

The women's shot put event at the 2007 Pan American Games was held on July 27.

== Results ==
| Rank | Athlete | Nationality | #1 | #2 | #3 | #4 | #5 | #6 | Result | Notes |
|---|---|---|---|---|---|---|---|---|---|---|
| 1st place, gold medalist(s) | Misleydis González | Cuba | 17.10 | 18.28 | 17.99 | 18.51 | 18.83 | 18.49 | 18.83 | |
| 2nd place, silver medalist(s) | Yumileidi Cumbá | Cuba | 17.87 | 18.04 | x | 17.92 | 17.96 | 18.28 | 18.28 | |
| 3rd place, bronze medalist(s) | Cleopatra Borel-Brown | Trinidad and Tobago | 17.11 | 17.76 | 17.47 | 17.81 | 18.28 | 18.09 | 18.22 | |
| 4 | Jillian Camarena | United States | 17.37 | 17.92 | x | x | 17.67 | 18.11 | 18.11 | |
| 5 | Kristin Heaston | United States | x | 16.98 | 17.88 | 17.15 | 17.85 | 17.51 | 17.88 | |
| 6 | Elisângela Adriano | Brazil | x | 17.47 | x | 17.41 | 17.73 | 17.33 | 17.73 | SB |
| 7 | Natalia Ducó | Chile | 15.56 | 16.92 | 16.54 | 16.55 | 16.76 | 16.63 | 16.92 | PB |
| 8 | Andrea Britto | Brazil | 15.81 | 15.99 | 16.52 | x | 15.68 | 15.73 | 16.52 | |
| 9 | Zara Northover | Jamaica | 15.12 | 14.66 | 15.90 | | | | 15.90 | |
| 10 | Nadia Alexander | Jamaica | 15.82 | x | x | | | | 15.82 | |
| 11 | Annie Alexander | Trinidad and Tobago | 15.14 | 13.24 | 15.64 | | | | 15.64 | |
| 12 | Shernelle Nicholls | Barbados | 14.67 | 14.89 | 15.62 | | | | 15.62 | |
| 13 | Keisha Walkes | Barbados | 15.14 | 14.97 | 15.16 | | | | 15.16 | |
| 14 | Rocío Comba | Argentina | 14.83 | 14.80 | x | | | | 14.83 | |
| 15 | Margarita Bernardo | Dominican Republic | 14.47 | x | 14.32 | | | | 14.47 | |
| 16 | Amyra Albury | Bahamas | x | 13.80 | 14.14 | | | | 14.14 | |
