= Nadine Kleinert =

German shot putter

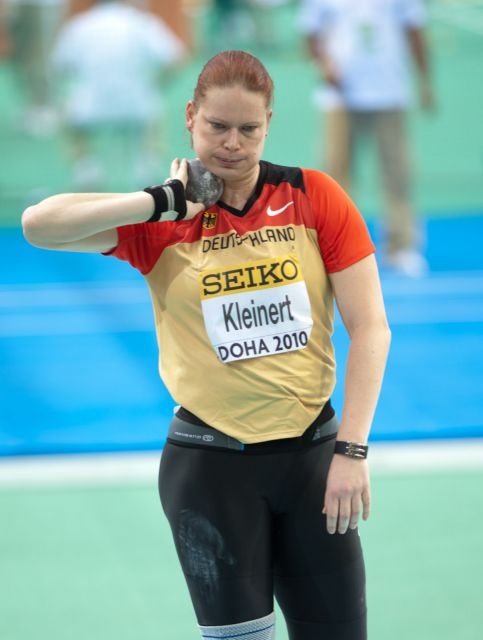
- Kleinert at the 2010 IAAF World Indoor Championships

Personal information
- Born: 20 October 1975 (age 51) Magdeburg, East Germany
- Height: 1.90 m (6 ft 3 in)
- Weight: 94 kg (207 lb)

Sport
- Country: Germany
- Sport: Athletics
- Event: Shot put

Achievements and titles
- Personal best: 20.20 m (2009)
Medal record
Olympic Games
Silver medal – second place	2004 Athens	Shot put
World Championships
Silver medal – second place	1999 Seville	Shot put
Silver medal – second place	2001 Edmonton	Shot put
Silver medal – second place	2007 Osaka	Shot put
Silver medal – second place	2009 Berlin	Shot put
Bronze medal – third place	2005 Helsinki	Shot put
World Indoor Championships
Silver medal – second place	2006 Moscow	Shot put
Bronze medal – third place	2004 Budapest	Shot put
Bronze medal – third place	2010 Doha	Shot put
European Championships
Gold medal – first place	2012 Helsinki	Shot put
- Updated on 6 August 2012

Nadine Schmitt (née Kleinert; born 20 October 1975 in Magdeburg, Saxony-Anhalt) is a German shot putter.

Her personal best throw is 20.20 metres, achieved in August 2009 in Berlin. She competed at four Summer Olympic Games, from 2000 to 2012.

== Achievements ==
Year	Competition	Venue	Position	Notes
Representing Germany
1992	World Junior Championships	Seoul, South Korea	12th	14.10 m
1993	European Junior Championships	San Sebastián, Spain	2nd	17.07 m
1994	World Junior Championships	Lisbon, Portugal	6th	16.70 m
1996	European Indoor Championships	Stockholm, Sweden	5th	18.10 m
1997	European U23 Championships	Turku, Finland	1st	18.27 m
1997	World Championships	Athens, Greece	7th	18.42 m
1998	European Indoor Championships	Valencia, Spain	5th	18.42 m
1998	Goodwill Games	Uniondale, United States	4th	18.55 m
1998	European Championships	Budapest, Hungary	6th	18.48 m
1998	World Cup	Johannesburg, South Africa	6th	17.60 m
1999	World Indoor Championships	Maebashi, Japan	5th	18.51 m
1999	World Championships	Seville, Spain	2nd	19.61 m (PB)
2000	European Indoor Championships	Ghent, Belgium	2nd	19.23 m
2000	Olympic Games	Sydney, Australia	8th	18.49 m
2001	World Indoor Championships	Lisbon, Portugal	4th	18.87 m
2001	World Championships	Edmonton, Alberta	2nd	19.86 m = PB
2002	European Championships	Munich, Germany	6th	18.68 m
2003	World Indoor Championships	Birmingham, United Kingdom	–	NM
2003	World Championships	Paris, France	7th	18.48 m
2003	World Athletics Final	Monte Carlo, Monaco	6th	18.15 m
2004	World Indoor Championships	Budapest, Hungary	3rd	19.05 m
2004	Olympic Games	Athens, Greece	2nd	19.55 m
2004	World Athletics Final	Monte Carlo, Monaco	4th	17.97 m
2005	World Championships	Helsinki, Finland	3rd	19.07 m
2005	World Athletics Final	Monte Carlo, Monaco	5th	18.46 m
2006	World Indoor Championships	Moscow, Russia	2nd	19.64 m (PBi)
2006	European Championships	Gothenburg, Sweden	6th	18.47 m
2006	World Athletics Final	Stuttgart, Germany	5th	18.18 m
2007	World Championships	Osaka, Japan	2nd	19.77 m
2007	World Athletics Final	Stuttgart, Germany	3rd	19.36 m
2008	Olympic Games	Beijing, China	7th	19.01 m
2009	World Championships	Berlin, Germany	2nd	20.20 m
2010	World Indoor Championships	Doha, Qatar	3rd	19.34 m
2010	European Championships	Barcelona, Spain	7th	18.94 m
2011	World Championships	Daegu, South Korea	8th	19.26 m
2012	World Indoor Championships	Istanbul, Turkey	4th	19.29 m
2012	European Championships	Helsinki, Finland	1st	19.18 m
2012	Olympic Games	London, United Kingdom	13th (q)	18.36 m
