= Yumileidi Cumbá =

Cuban shot putter (born 1975)

Personal information
- Full name: Yumileidi Cumbá Jay
- Born: February 11, 1975 (age 51) Guantánamo
- Height: 1.82 m (6 ft 0 in)
- Weight: 85 kg (187 lb)

Sport
- Country: Cuba
- Sport: Athletics
- Event: Shot put

Achievements and titles
- Personal best: 19.97 m
Medal record
Athletics
Representing Cuba
Olympic Games
Gold medal – first place	2004 Athens	Shot put
World Indoor Championships
Silver medal – second place	2004 Budapest	Shot put
Pan American Games
Gold medal – first place	2003 Santo Domingo	Shot put
Silver medal – second place	1999 Winnipeg	Shot put
Silver medal – second place	2007 Rio de Janeiro	Shot put
Bronze medal – third place	1995 Mar del Plata	Shot put
Summer Universiade
Gold medal – first place	1999 Palma de Mallorca	Shot put
Gold medal – first place	2001 Beijing	Shot put
CAC Junior Championships (U17)
Gold medal – first place	1990 Havana	Discus throw
Silver medal – second place	1990 Havana	Shot put
- Updated on 14 June 2013

Yumileidi Cumbá Jay (Spanish pronunciation: [ʝumiˈlejði kumˈba], also Yumisleidis; born February 11, 1975) is a Cuban shot putter.

== Career ==
Her greatest season was 2004, when she won an Olympic gold medal and achieved a new personal best throw.

Her current personal best throw is 19.97 metres, achieved at the 2004 Ibero-American Championships in Huelva.

Her name is a transliteration of "You Milady", and is in the Cuban tradition of using odd, foreign-born names.

== Personal best ==
Outdoor

- Shot put: 19.97 m – Huelva, 8 August 2004

Indoor

- Shot put: 19.31 m – Budapest, 5 March 2004

== International competitions ==
Year	Competition	Venue	Position	Event	Notes
Representing Cuba
1990	Central American and Caribbean Junior Championships (U-17)	Havana, Cuba	2nd	Shot put	14.54 m
1990	Central American and Caribbean Junior Championships (U-17)	Havana, Cuba	1st	Discus throw	38.96 m
1992	World Junior Championships	Seoul, South Korea	4th	Shot put	17.06 m
1993	Pan American Junior Championships	Winnipeg, Canada	1st	Shot put	17.55 m
1993	Pan American Junior Championships	Winnipeg, Canada	5th	Discus throw	42.84 m
1993	Central American and Caribbean Games	Ponce, Puerto Rico	2nd	Shot put	17.67 m
1994	World Junior Championships	Lisbon, Portugal	2nd	Shot put	18.09 m
1995	Pan American Games	Mar del Plata, Argentina	3rd	Shot put	18.47 m
1995	World Championships	Gothenburg, Sweden	20th	Shot put	15.80 m
1996	Olympic Games	Atlanta, United States	13th (q)	Shot put	18.55 m
1998	Central American and Caribbean Games	Maracaibo, Venezuela	1st	Shot put	18.89 m
1998	World Cup	Johannesburg, South Africa	4th	Shot put	18.76 m
1999	World Indoor Championships	Maebashi, Japan	6th	Shot put	17.80 m
1999	Universiade	Palma de Mallorca, Spain	2nd	Shot put	18.70 m
1999	Pan American Games	Winnipeg, Canada	2nd	Shot put	18.67 m
1999	World Championships	Seville, Spain	6th	Shot put	18.44 m
2000	Olympic Games	Sydney, Australia	6th	Shot put	18.70 m
2001	World Indoor Championships	Lisbon, Portugal	5th	Shot put	18.61 m
2001	World Championships	Edmonton, Canada	8th	Shot put	18.73 m
2001	Universiade	Beijing, China	1st	Shot put	18.90 m
2001	Goodwill Games	Brisbane, Australia	2nd	Shot put	18.41 m
2002	Ibero-American Championships	Guatemala City, Guatemala	1st	Shot put	18.87 m
2002	World Cup	Madrid, Spain	2nd	Shot put	19.14 m
2003	World Indoor Championships	Birmingham, United Kingdom	6th	Shot put	19.19 m
2003	Pan American Games	Santo Domingo, Dominican Republic	1st	Shot put	19.31 m
2003	World Championships	Paris, France	13th (q)	Shot put	17.95 m
2004	World Indoor Championships	Budapest, Hungary	2nd	Shot put	19.31 m
2004	Ibero-American Championships	Huelva, Spain	1st	Shot put	19.97 m
2004	Olympic Games	Athens, Greece	1st	Shot put	19.59 m
2005	Central American and Caribbean Championships	Nassau, Bahamas	1st	Shot put	18.98 m
2005	World Championships	Helsinki, Finland	4th	Shot put	18.64 m
2005	World Athletics Final	Monte Carlo, Monaco	7th	Shot put	18.44 m
2006	World Indoor Championships	Moscow, Russia	5th	Shot put	18.28 m
2006	Central American and Caribbean Games	Cartagena, Colombia	1st	Shot put	19.31 m
2006	World Athletics Final	Stuttgart, Germany	4th	Shot put	18.78 m
2006	World Cup	Athens, Greece	3rd	Shot put	19.12 m
2007	ALBA Games	Caracas, Venezuela	1st	Shot put	18.24 m
2007	Pan American Games	Rio de Janeiro, Brazil	2nd	Shot put	18.28 m
2007	World Championships	Osaka, Japan	12th	Shot put	17.93 m
2008	Central American and Caribbean Championships	Cali, Colombia	2nd	Shot put	18.10 m
2008	Olympic Games	Beijing, China	20th (q)	Shot put	17.60 m
