= Athletics at the 2003 Pan American Games – Women's discus throw =

Women's discus throw at the Pan American Games

The final of the Women's Discus Throw event at the 2003 Pan American Games took place on Tuesday August 5, 2003. Defending champion Aretha Hill of the United States once again claimed the title.

== Medalists ==
Gold	Aretha Hill; United States
Silver	Anaelys Fernández; Cuba
Bronze	Yania Ferrales; Cuba

== Records ==
World Record	Gabriele Reinsch (GDR)	76.80 m	July 9, 1988	Neubrandenburg, East Germany
Pan Am Record	Maritza Martén (CUB)	65.58 m	August 10, 1987	Indianapolis, United States

== Results ==
Rank	Athlete	Throws						Final
Rank	Athlete	1	2	3	4	5	6	Result
1	Aretha Hill (USA)	57.27	61.27	58.63	63.30	57.99	60.29	63.30 m
2	Anaelys Fernández (CUB)	X	57.89	55.68	61.26	61.25	60.19	61.26 m
3	Yania Ferrales (CUB)	53.59	55.22	57.20	60.03	58.44	55.15	60.03 m
4	Suzanne Powell (USA)	59.30	59.97	60.00	X	X	X	60.00 m
5	Elisângela Adriano (BRA)	56.58	58.80	57.72	58.17	55.79	X	58.80 m
6	Luz Dary Castro (COL)	52.51	X	51.02	X	X	55.65	55.65 m
7	Mary Mercedes (DOM)	X	44.46	X	42.18	X	X	44.46 m
8	Marianne Berndt (CHI)	42.45	X	41.87	X	—	—	42.45 m

== See also ==
- 2003 World Championships in Athletics – Women's discus throw
- Athletics at the 2004 Summer Olympics – Women's discus throw
