= 1997 European Athletics U23 Championships – Women's shot put =

The women's shot put event at the 1997 European Athletics U23 Championships was held in Turku, Finland, on 11 July 1997.

== Medalists ==
Gold	Nadine Kleinert; Germany
Silver	Corrie de Bruin; Netherlands
Bronze	Yanina Korolchik; Belarus

== Results ==
=== Final ===
11 July

Rank	Name	Nationality	Attempts						Result	Notes
Rank	Name	Nationality	1	2	3	4	5	6	Result	Notes
1st place, gold medalist(s)	Nadine Kleinert	Germany	18.12	x	x	x	x	18.27	18.27	
2nd place, silver medalist(s)	Corrie de Bruin	Netherlands	17.76	18.06	17.94	x	x	18.02	18.06	
3rd place, bronze medalist(s)	Yanina Korolchik	Belarus	17.08	17.98	17.56	17.39	x	x	17.98	
4	Olga Ryabinkina	Russia	16.28	16.44	16.93	16.89	17.56	17.36	17.56	
5	Katarzyna Żakowicz	Poland	16.28	17.34	17.31	17.45	17.10	x	17.45	
6	Lieja Koeman	Netherlands	16.59	16.82	x	x	x	x	16.82	
7	Martina de la Puente	Spain	16.44	16.70	x	16.72	x	x	16.72	
8	Yelena Klochikhina	Russia	15.96	15.96	16.50	x	x	x	16.50	
9	Natalya Lazor	Ukraine	15.93	15.82	x				15.93	
10	Anna Rauhala	Finland	x	x	15.86				15.86	
11	Nadine Beckel	Germany	x	15.51	x				15.51	
	Gülseren Tavan	Turkey	x	x	x				NM	

== Participation ==
According to an unofficial count, 12 athletes from 9 countries participated in the event.

- Belarus (1)
- Finland (1)
- Germany (2)
- Netherlands (2)
- Poland (1)
- Russia (2)
- Spain (1)
- Turkey (1)
- Ukraine (1)
