= Athletics at the 2000 Summer Olympics – Women's shot put =

Women's shot put at the Games of the XXVII Olympiad
- Pictogram for athletics
- Venue: Stadium Australia
- Date: 27 September 2000 (qualifications 28 September 2000 (finals)
- Competitors: 25 from 18 nations
- Winning distance: 20.56

Medalists
1st place, gold medalist(s)		Yanina Korolchik; Belarus
2nd place, silver medalist(s)		Larisa Peleshenko; Russia
3rd place, bronze medalist(s)		Astrid Kumbernuss; Germany

The women's shot put event at the 2000 Summer Olympics as part of the athletics program was held at the Olympic Stadium on Thursday, 28 September, with the Qualification held on Wednesday, 27 September.

The qualifying athletes progressed through to the final where the qualifying distances are scrapped and they start afresh with up to six throws. The qualifying distance was 18.50m. For all qualifiers who did not achieve the standard, the remaining spaces in the final were filled by the longest throws until a total of 12 qualifiers.

== Medalists ==
Gold	Yanina Korolchik; Belarus
Silver	Larisa Peleshenko; Russia
Bronze	Astrid Kumbernuss; Germany

== Schedule ==
- All times are Australian Eastern Standard Time (UTC+10)

Qualification Round
Group A	Group B
27 September 2000 – 10:00h	27 September 2000 – 10:00h
Final Round
28 September 2000 – 20:30h

== Abbreviations ==
- All results shown are in metres

Q	automatic qualification
q	qualification by rank
DNS	did not start
NM	no mark
OR	olympic record
WR	world record
AR	area record
NR	national record
PB	personal best
SB	season best

== Records ==
Standing records prior to the 2000 Summer Olympics
World Record	Natalya Lisovskaya (URS)	22.63 m	7 June 1987	Moscow, Soviet Union
Olympic Record	Ilona Slupianek (GDR)	22.41 m	24 July 1980	Moscow, Soviet Union

== Qualification ==
=== Group A ===
Rank	Overall	Athlete	Country	Attempts			Distance	Note
Rank	Overall	Athlete	Country	1	2	3	Distance	Note
1	4	Krystyna Danilczyk-Zabawska	Poland	18.32	18.42	18.93	18.93 m	
2	5	Astrid Kumbernuss	Germany	18.90	—	—	18.90 m	
3	6	Svetlana Krivelyova	Russia	18.48	18.56	—	18.56 m	
4	7	Kalliopi Ouzouni	Greece	17.35	18.56	—	18.56 m	
5	8	Yumileidi Cumbá	Cuba	X	18.02	18.42	18.42 m	
6	10	Cheng Xiaoyan	China	17.67	18.23	X	18.23 m	
7	11	Lieja Koeman	Netherlands	17.43	17.99	17.35	17.99 m	
8	14	Vivian Chukwuemeka	Nigeria	X	17.33	17.47	17.47 m	
9	15	Lee Myung-Sun	South Korea	17.25	17.40	17.44	17.44 m	
10	16	Connie Price-Smith	United States	17.38	16.70	17.42	17.42 m	
11	20	Laurence Manfredi	France	16.57	16.38	X	16.57 m	
12	23	Martina de la Puente	Spain	X	16.30	X	16.30 m	

=== Group B ===
Rank	Overall	Athlete	Country	Attempts			Distance	Note
Rank	Overall	Athlete	Country	1	2	3	Distance	Note
1	1	Yanina Korolchik	Belarus	19.36	—	—	19.36 m	
2	2	Olga Ryabinkina	Russia	17.32	18.04	19.20	19.20 m	PB
3	4	Larisa Peleshenko	Russia	19.08	—	—	19.08 m	
4	9	Nadine Kleinert-Schmitt	Germany	17.75	X	18.39	18.39 m	
5	12	Valentina Fedjuschina	Austria	16.95	17.84	17.45	17.84 m	
6	13	Judy Oakes	Great Britain	16.96	X	17.81	17.81 m	
7	17	Jesseca Cross	United States	17.15	17.27	16.91	17.27 m	
8	18	Katarzyna Żakowicz	Poland	16.49	16.74	16.95	16.95 m	
9	19	Mara Rosolen	Italy	16.13	X	16.66	16.66 m	
10	21	Iolanta Ulyeva	Kazakhstan	16.38	15.11	16.31	16.38 m	
11	22	Teri Tunks	United States	X	15.30	16.34	16.34 m	
12	24	Yu Xin	China	15.68	16.18	—	16.18 m	
13	25	Nada Kawar	Jordan	X	15.67	X	15.67 m	

== Final ==
Rank	Athlete	Attempts						Distance	Note
Rank	Athlete	1	2	3	4	5	6	Distance	Note
1st place, gold medalist(s)	Yanina Korolchik (BLR)	19.43	X	18.76	19.11	X	20.56	20.56 m	NR
2nd place, silver medalist(s)	Larisa Peleshenko (RUS)	19.16	19.92	19.79	X	X	19.60	19.92 m	
3rd place, bronze medalist(s)	Astrid Kumbernuss (GER)	19.38	19.24	18.73	18.76	18.89	19.62	19.62 m	
4	Svetlana Krivelyova (RUS)	18.84	18.60	19.04	19.12	19.37	19.36	19.37 m	
5	Krystyna Zabawska (POL)	18.61	17.93	19.18	18.39	X	17.16	19.18 m	SB
6	Yumileidi Cumbá (CUB)	18.33	18.30	18.70	X	X	X	18.70 m	
7	Kalliopi Ouzouni (GRE)	18.45	X	18.63	18.34	X	17.09	18.63 m	NR
8	Nadine Kleinert-Schmitt (GER)	X	18.49	18.33	X	X	X	18.49 m	
9	Lieja Koeman (NED)	X	17.56	17.96				17.96 m	
10	Olga Ryabinkina (RUS)	17.33	17.85	17.66				17.85 m	
11	Cheng Xiaoyan (CHN)	17.30	17.85	X				17.85 m	
12	Valentina Fedjuschina (AUT)	16.70	17.14	16.75				17.14 m	
