= Athletics at the 1999 Pan American Games – Women's shot put =

Women's shot put at the Pan American Games

The women's shot put event at the 1999 Pan American Games was held on July 27.

== Results ==
Rank	Name	Nationality	#1	#2	#3	#4	#5	#6	Result	Notes
1st place, gold medalist(s)	Connie Price-Smith	United States	16.84	19.06	18.20	x	x	18.35	19.06	
2nd place, silver medalist(s)	Yumileidi Cumbá	Cuba	18.36	x	18.05	18.67	18.48	18.56	18.67	
3rd place, bronze medalist(s)	Teri Tunks	United States	17.42	17.68	17.66	18.03	x	17.86	18.03	
4	Elisângela Adriano	Brazil	x	17.83	17.67	x	17.42	18.00	18.00	
5	Belsy Laza	Cuba	x	17.69	17.67	17.67	x	x	17.69	
6	Rhonda Hackett	Trinidad and Tobago	14.95	15.26	15.10	15.35	15.36	x	15.36	
7	María Mercedes	Dominican Republic	14.39	x	14.29	14.27	14.50	14.54	14.54	
8	Marianne Berndt	Chile	12.67	x	13.47	13.78	13.43	12.84	13.78	
