= Cheng Xiaoyan =

Chinese shot putter (born 1975)

Personal information
- Born: December 20, 1975 (age 50) Qingdao, China

Sport
- Sport: Track and field
Medal record
Representing China
Asian Games
Silver medal – second place	1998 Bangkok	Shot put
Asian Championships
Silver medal – second place	2002 Colombo	Shot put
Summer Universiade
Silver medal – second place	1995 Fukuoka	Shot put
East Asian Games
Gold medal – first place	2001 Osaka	Shot put

Cheng Xiaoyan (simplified Chinese: 程晓燕; traditional Chinese: 程曉燕; pinyin: Chéng Xiǎoyàn; born December 20, 1975) is a retired Chinese shot putter. She is from Qingdao.

Her personal best throw is 20.02 metres, achieved in June 1994 in Beijing.

== Achievements ==
Year	Competition	Venue	Position	Notes
Representing China
1994	World Junior Championships	Lisbon, Portugal	1st	18.76 m
1995	Universiade	Fukuoka, Japan	2nd	17.95 m
1998	Asian Games	Bangkok, Thailand	2nd	18.55 m
1999	World Championships	Seville, Spain	5th	18.67 m
2000	Olympic Games	Sydney, Australia	11th	17.85 m
2001	World Indoor Championships	Lisbon, Portugal	7th	18.22 m
2001	East Asian Games	Osaka, Japan	1st	18.47 m
2001	World Championships	Edmonton, Canada	15th	17.32 m
2001	Universiade	Beijing, China	4th	18.22 m
2002	Asian Championships	Colombo, Sri Lanka	2nd	17.39 m
