= Marianne Berndt =

Chilean athlete (born 1978)

Personal information
- Born: December 24, 1978 (age 47)

Sport
- Sport: Track and field

Marianne Berndt Ortiz (born December 24, 1978) is a female shot putter and discus thrower from Chile. She set her personal best (16.39m) in the women's shot put at the 2003 South American Championships.

== Competition record ==
| Year | Competition | Venue | Position | Event | Notes |
Representing Chile
| 1994 | South American Youth Championships | Cochabamba, Bolivia | 4th | Shot put | 11.02 m |
| 1994 | South American Youth Championships | Cochabamba, Bolivia | 5th | Discus throw | 28.64 m |
| 1994 | South American Youth Championships | Cochabamba, Bolivia | 6th | Javelin throw | 24.88 m |
| 1995 | Pan American Junior Championships | Santiago, Chile | 8th | Shot put | 11.45 m |
| 1995 | South American Junior Championships | Santiago, Chile | 7th | Shot put | 11.94 m |
| 1996 | South American Junior Championships | Bucaramanga, Colombia | 7th | Shot put | 11.65 m |
| 1996 | South American Junior Championships | Bucaramanga, Colombia | 10th | Discus throw | 30.38 m |
| 1997 | Pan American Junior Championships | Havana, Cuba | 7th | Shot put | 12.28 m |
| 1997 | South American Junior Championships | San Carlos, Uruguay | 5th | Shot put | 12.20 m |
| 1997 | South American Junior Championships | San Carlos, Uruguay | 7th | Discus throw | 34.60 m |
| 1999 | South American Championships | Bogotá, Colombia | 3rd | Shot put | 15.00 m |
| 1999 | Universiade | Palma, Spain | 10th | Shot put | 15.02 m |
| 1999 | Pan American Games | Winnipeg, Canada | 8th | Shot put | 13.78 m |
| 2000 | Ibero-American Championships | Rio de Janeiro, Brazil | 2nd | Shot put | 15.07 m |
| 2001 | South American Championships | Manaus, Brazil | 3rd | Shot put | 15.38 m |
| 2001 | South American Championships | Manaus, Brazil | 5th | Discus throw | 42.68 m |
| 2001 | Universiade | Beijing, China | 16th | Shot put | 14.59 m |
| 2002 | Ibero-American Championships | Guatemala City, Guatemala | 6th | Shot put | 15.22 m |
| 2003 | South American Championships | Barquisimeto, Venezuela | 3rd | Shot put | 16.39 m |
| 2003 | South American Championships | Barquisimeto, Venezuela | 6th | Discus throw | 47.18 m |
| 2003 | Pan American Games | Santo Domingo, Dom. Rep. | 8th | Shot put | 15.37 m |
| 2003 | Pan American Games | Santo Domingo, Dom. Rep. | 8th | Discus throw | 42.45 m |
| 2005 | South American Championships | Cali, Colombia | 4th | Shot put | 14.56 m |
| 2005 | South American Championships | Cali, Colombia | 5th | Discus throw | 49.00 m |
| 2006 | Ibero-American Championships | Ponce, Puerto Rico | 3rd | Discus throw | 50.05 m |
