= Athletics at the 1998 Asian Games – Women's shot put =

Women's shot put at the 1998 Asian Games
- Venue: Thammasat Stadium
- Dates: 15 December 1998
- Competitors: 6 from 4 nations

Medalists
| gold medal | Li Meisu | China |
| silver medal | Cheng Xiaoyan | China |
| bronze medal | Juttaporn Krasaeyan | Thailand |

The women's shot put competition at the 1998 Asian Games in Bangkok, Thailand was held on 15 December at the Thammasat Stadium.

== Schedule ==
All times are Indochina Time (UTC+07:00)

| Date | Time | Event |
|---|---|---|
| Tuesday, 15 December 1998 | 14:50 | Final |

== Results ==
| Rank | Athlete | Result | Notes |
|---|---|---|---|
| 1st place, gold medalist(s) | Li Meisu (CHN) | 18.96 | |
| 2nd place, silver medalist(s) | Cheng Xiaoyan (CHN) | 18.55 | |
| 3rd place, bronze medalist(s) | Juttaporn Krasaeyan (THA) | 18.24 | |
| 4 | Lee Myung-sun (KOR) | 18.05 | |
| 5 | Sumi Ichioka (JPN) | 15.75 | |
| 6 | Sunisa Yooyao (THA) | 15.64 | |
