= Teri Steer =

American shot putter

Personal information
- Nationality: American
- Born: October 3, 1975 (age 50) Crete, Nebraska, United States
- Education: Southern Methodist University
- Spouse: Christian Cantwell

Sport
- Country: United States
- Sport: Athletics
- Event: Shot put

Achievements and titles
- Olympic finals: 22nd (2000)
- World finals: 9th (1999)
- Regional finals: Bronze (1999)
- Personal best: 19.21m (2001)
Medal record
Representing United States
World Indoor Championships
Bronze medal – third place	1999 Maebashi	Shot put
Pan American Games
Bronze medal – third place	1999 Winnipeg	Shot put

Teri Steer-Cantwell (born October 3, 1975, in Crete, Nebraska) is an American shot putter.

== Career ==
In 1999, she won bronze medals at the World Indoor Championships and the Pan American Games, and finished ninth at the World Championships. She attended Southern Methodist University (SMU) in Dallas, Texas.

Her personal best throw is 19.21 metres (63.0 ft), achieved in April 2001 in Des Moines, Iowa.

In 2019, she was inducted into the SMU Mustangs Hall of Fame.

== Personal life ==
Steer-Cantwell is married to shot putter Christian Cantwell. She hails from Crete, Nebraska and currently resides in Columbia, Missouri.

On May 27, 2008, she gave birth to her first son, Jackson Daniel Cantwell, 11-pounds 2-ounces.

== International competitions ==
Year	Competition	Venue	Position	Notes
Representing the United States
1994	World Junior Championships	Lisbon, Portugal	15th (q)	14.46 m
1998	Goodwill Games	Uniondale, United States	5th	18.30 m
1999	World Indoor Championships	Maebashi, Japan	3rd	18.86 m
1999	Pan American Games	Winnipeg, Manitoba, Canada	3rd	18.03 m
1999	World Championships	Seville, Spain	9th	18.04 m
2000	Olympic Games	Sydney, Australia	22nd (q)	16.34 m
