= Krystyna Zabawska =

Polish shot putter (born 1968)

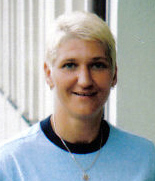

Personal information
- Nationality: Polish
- Born: 14 January 1968 (age 58) Kopczany, Poland
- Died: Poland
- Height: 1.83 m (6 ft 0 in)
- Weight: 92 kg (203 lb)

Sport
- Sport: Athletics
- Event: Shot Put
- Club: Jagiellonia Białystok (1989–1994); Podlasie Białystok (1995–2010)
Medal record
Women's athletics
Representing Poland
World Indoor Championships
Silver medal – second place	1999 Maebashi	Shot put
European Indoor Championships
Silver medal – second place	2005 Spain	Shot put

Krystyna Danilczyk-Zabawska (born 14 January 1968) is a former Polish shot putter.

She was born as Krystyna Danilczyk in Kopczany near Lipsk nad Biebrzą. She lives in Białystok. Her husband and former coach is Przemysław Zabawski, also a former shot putter.

== Achievements ==
Year	Competition	Venue	Position	Notes
Representing Poland
1991	World Indoor Championships	Seville, Spain	11th	16.04 m
1991	World Championships	Tokyo, Japan	12th	17.59 m
1992	Olympic Games	Barcelona, Spain	10th	18.29 m
1993	World Championships	Stuttgart, Germany	13th (q)	18.62 m
1994	European Indoor Championships	Paris, France	6th	18.57 m
1994	European Championships	Helsinki, Finland	9th	17.50 m
1997	World Indoor Championships	Paris, France	9th	18.18 m
1997	World Championships	Athens, Greece	8th	17.83 m
1998	European Indoor Championships	Valencia, Spain	4th	18.81 m
1998	European Championships	Budapest, Hungary	11th	17.69 m
1999	World Indoor Championships	Maebashi, Japan	2nd	19.00 m
1999	World Championships	Seville, Spain	8th	18.12 m
2000	European Indoor Championships	Ghent, Belgium	5th	18.88 m
2000	Olympic Games	Sydney, Australia	5th	19.18 m
2001	World Indoor Championships	Lisbon, Portugal	8th	18.12 m
2001	World Championships	Edmonton, Canada	10th	18.50 m
2001	Goodwill Games	Brisbane, Australia	3rd	18.23 m
2002	European Championships	Munich, Germany	7th	18.63 m
2003	World Championships	Paris, France	6th	18.62 m
2003	World Athletics Final	Szombathely, Hungary	8th	17.85 m
2004	World Indoor Championships	Budapest, Hungary	4th	19.00 m
2004	Olympic Games	Olympia, Greece	5th	18.64 m
2004	World Athletics Final	Monte Carlo, Monaco	2nd	18.27 m
2005	European Indoor Championships	Madrid, Spain	2nd	18.96 m
2006	World Indoor Championships	Moscow, Russia	10th (q)	17.53 m
2006	European Championships	Gothenburg, Sweden	8th	17.99 m
2006	World Cup	Athens, Greece	7th	17.74 m
2008	Olympic Games	Beijing, China	–	NM
