= 2002 Asian Athletics Championships – Women's shot put =

Asian Athletics championships

The women's shot put event at the 2002 Asian Athletics Championships was held in Colombo, Sri Lanka on 12 August.

== Results ==
Rank	Name	Nationality	Result	Notes
1st place, gold medalist(s)	Juttaporn Krasaeyan	Thailand	18.05	SB
2nd place, silver medalist(s)	Cheng Xiaoyan	China	17.39	
3rd place, bronze medalist(s)	Sumi Ichioka	Japan	16.12	
4	Lee Mi-Young	South Korea	15.94	
5	Iolanta Ulyeva	Kazakhstan	15.85	
6	Harwant Kaur	India	15.37	
7	Parisa Behzadi	Iran	12.41	
8	M.A.S.N. Muthnayake	Sri Lanka	12.01	PB
