= Lee Myung-sun =

South Korean shot putter (born 1976)

Lee Myung-Sun
Personal information
- Nationality: South Korean
- Born: 12 February 1976 (age 50) Iksan, South Korea
- Occupation: Shot putter

Korean name
- Hangul: 이명선
- RR: I Myeongseon
- MR: I Myŏngsŏn
Medal record
Women's athletics
Representing South Korea
Asian Games
Silver medal – second place	2002 Busan	Shot put
Summer Universiade
Silver medal – second place	2001 Beijing	Shot put
Silver medal – second place	2003 Daegu	Shot put
Asian Championships
Silver medal – second place	1993 Manila	Shot put
Bronze medal – third place	1998 Fukuoka	Shot put

Lee Myung-Sun (Korean: 이명선; born 12 February 1976) is a retired South Korean shot putter. Her personal best throw is 19.36 metres, achieved in April 2000 in Shanghai. This is the current South Korean record.

== Achievements ==
Year	Competition	Venue	Position	Notes
Representing South Korea
1992	World Junior Championships	Seoul, South Korea	8th	15.33 m
1992	Asian Junior Championships	Jakarta, Indonesia	2nd	14.49 m
1993	East Asian Games	Shanghai, China	3rd	15.99 m
1993	Asian Championships	Manila, Philippines	2nd	16.08 m
1994	World Junior Championships	Lisbon, Portugal	10th	15.08 m
1996	Olympic Games	Atlanta, United States	20th (q)	16.92 m
1997	East Asian Games	Busan, South Korea	3rd	17.56 m
1997	World Championships	Athens, Greece	23rd (q)	16.39 m
1997	Universiade	Catania, Italy	9th	16.75 m
1998	Asian Championships	Fukuoka, Japan	3rd	17.66 m
1998	Asian Games	Bangkok, Thailand	4th	18.05 m
1999	World Championships	Seville, Spain	10th	17.92 m
2000	Olympic Games	Sydney, Australia	15th (q)	17.44 m
2001	World Indoor Championships	Lisbon, Portugal	11th	17.09 m
2001	East Asian Games	Osaka, Japan	2nd	18.07 m
2001	World Championships	Edmonton, Canada	14th (q)	17.66 m
2001	Universiade	Beijing, China	2nd	18.79 m
2002	Asian Games	Busan, South Korea	7th	15.80 m
2003	Universiade	Daegu, South Korea	2nd	17.58 m
2003	Asian Championships	Manila, Philippines	6th	17.21 m
