= Athletics at the 1995 Pan American Games – Women's shot put =

Women's shot put at the Pan American Games

The women's shot put event at the 1995 Pan American Games was held at the Estadio Atletico "Justo Roman" on 21 March.

== Results ==
Rank	Name	Nationality	#1	#2	#3	#4	#5	#6	Result	Notes
1st place, gold medalist(s)	Connie Price-Smith	United States	16.87	19.17	18.43	x	17.93	17.90	19.17	
2nd place, silver medalist(s)	Ramona Pagel	United States	17.86	18.50	17.78	18.10	18.16	17.80	18.50	
3rd place, bronze medalist(s)	Yumileidi Cumbá	Cuba	18.47	18.19	18.27	18.00	18.18	18.34	18.47	
4	Belsis Laza	Cuba	17.75	18.08	17.79	18.31	18.20	17.92	18.31	
5	Elisângela Adriano	Brazil	16.74	x	16.10	x	x	16.63	16.74	
6	Georgette Reed	Canada	16.10	15.77	x	x	14.93	15.74	16.10	
7	Alexandra Amaro	Brazil	12.84	15.72	15.94	15.97	x	x	15.97	
8	Ana María Comaschi	Argentina	13.33	12.42	12.13	12.81	x	11.92	13.33	
9	Ana Carolina Vera	Argentina	x	12.78	x				12.78	
