= 1997 European Athletics U23 Championships – Women's discus throw =

Women's championship in Europe

The women's discus throw event at the 1997 European Athletics U23 Championships was held in Turku, Finland, on 11 and 13 July 1997.

== Medalists ==
| Gold | Corrie de Bruin; Netherlands |
| Silver | Kathleen Hering; Germany |
| Bronze | Yanina Korolchik; Belarus |

== Results ==
=== Final ===
13 July

| Rank | Name | Nationality | Attempts | | | | | | Result | Notes |
| Rank | Name | Nationality | 1 | 2 | 3 | 4 | 5 | 6 | Result | Notes |
|---|---|---|---|---|---|---|---|---|---|---|
| 1st place, gold medalist(s) | Corrie de Bruin | Netherlands | 54.10 | 52.92 | 57.72 | 55.70 | x | x | 57.72 | |
| 2nd place, silver medalist(s) | Kathleen Hering | Germany | 53.40 | x | 48.34 | 47.86 | 56.78 | x | 56.78 | |
| 3rd place, bronze medalist(s) | Yanina Korolchik | Belarus | 51.90 | x | 52.30 | 54.54 | x | 56.36 | 56.36 | |
| 4 | Olga Ryabinkina | Russia | 52.80 | 56.06 | 54.88 | x | 56.06 | 55.52 | 56.06 | |
| 5 | Anna Rusakova | Russia | 55.28 | 52.36 | 52.80 | x | 53.12 | x | 55.28 | |
| 6 | Lieja Koeman | Netherlands | 54.62 | x | x | x | x | 53.92 | 54.62 | |
| 7 | Katja Tenhonen | Finland | 51.14 | 50.60 | 53.22 | 50.58 | 49.96 | x | 53.22 | |
| 8 | Olga Tsander | Belarus | 51.66 | x | x | 52.52 | 48.54 | 51.42 | 52.52 | |
| 9 | Elin Isane | Norway | 49.66 | 51.66 | 51.46 | 51.50 | 48.06 | 50.72 | 51.66 | |
| 10 | Nadine Beckel | Germany | x | x | 50.58 | | | | 50.58 | |
| 11 | Tiina Kankaanpää | Finland | 49.98 | x | x | | | | 49.98 | |
| 12 | Veerle Blondeel | Belgium | 48.72 | x | 46.90 | | | | 48.72 | |

=== Qualifications ===
11 July
Qualify: first to 12 to the Final

==== Group A ====
| Rank | Name | Nationality | Result | Notes |
|---|---|---|---|---|
| 1 | Corrie de Bruin | Netherlands | 56.54 | Q |
| 2 | Lieja Koeman | Netherlands | 55.46 | Q |
| 3 | Tiina Kankaanpää | Finland | 55.14 | Q |
| 4 | Anna Rusakova | Russia | 54.46 | Q |
| 5 | Olga Ryabinkina | Russia | 54.44 | Q |
| 6 | Elin Isane | Norway | 52.74 | Q |
| 7 | Nadine Beckel | Germany | 52.38 | Q |
| 8 | Yanina Korolchik | Belarus | 52.04 | Q |

==== Group B ====
| Rank | Name | Nationality | Result | Notes |
|---|---|---|---|---|
| 1 | Olga Tsander | Belarus | 55.30 | Q |
| 2 | Veerle Blondeel | Belgium | 54.24 | Q |
| 3 | Kathleen Hering | Germany | 53.50 | Q |
| 4 | Katja Tenhonen | Finland | 52.78 | Q |
| 5 | Catherine Géry | France | 50.60 | |
| 6 | Grete Etholm | Norway | 47.66 | |
| 7 | Jolanta Borawska | Poland | 45.92 | |
| 8 | Giorgia Baratella | Italy | 43.90 | |

== Participation ==
According to an unofficial count, 16 athletes from 10 countries participated in the event.

- Belarus (2)
- Belgium (1)
- Finland (2)
- France (1)
- Germany (2)
- Italy (1)
- Netherlands (2)
- Norway (2)
- Poland (1)
- Russia (2)
