= 2005 European Athletics Indoor Championships – Women's shot put =

The Women's shot put event at the 2005 European Athletics Indoor Championships was held on March 4–5.

== Medalists ==
Gold	Silver	Bronze
Nadzeya Astapchuk; Belarus	Krystyna Zabawska; Poland	Olga Ryabinkina; Russia

== Results ==
=== Qualification ===
Qualifying perf. 18.15 (Q) or 8 best performers (q) advanced to the Final.

Rank	Athlete	Nationality	#1	#2	#3	Result	Note
1	Nadzeya Astapchuk	Belarus	18.59			18.59	Q
2	Olga Ryabinkina	Russia	18.04	18.01	18.42	18.42	Q
3	Lieja Tunks	Netherlands	17.09	17.81	17.90	17.90	q
4	Nadine Beckel	Germany	17.84	17.05	16.90	17.84	q
5	Assunta Legnante	Italy	16.99	17.83	–	17.83	q
6	Olga Ivanova	Russia	16.98	17.13	17.76	17.76	q
7	Krystyna Zabawska	Poland	X	17.76	X	17.76	q
8	Petra Lammert	Germany	X	17.71	17.24	17.71	q
9	Oksana Chibisova	Russia	16.87	X	16.45	16.87	
10	Laurence Manfredi	France	16.16	16.12	16.32	16.32	
11	Martina de la Puente	Spain	15.92	X	16.28	16.28	

=== Final ===
Rank	Athlete	Nationality	#1	#2	#3	#4	#5	#6	Result	Note
1st place, gold medalist(s)	Nadzeya Astapchuk	Belarus	X	17.99	18.99	18.97	19.37	X	19.37	WL
2nd place, silver medalist(s)	Krystyna Zabawska	Poland	18.29	18.44	18.38	18.89	18.96	18.95	18.96	SB
3rd place, bronze medalist(s)	Olga Ryabinkina	Russia	18.78	X	18.65	18.83	X	X	18.83	
4	Petra Lammert	Germany	18.69	X	X	X	X	18.17	18.69	PB
5	Lieja Tunks	Netherlands	17.71	17.72	17.76	X	17.61	X	17.76	
6	Assunta Legnante	Italy	17.76	X	X	17.70	X	X	17.76	
7	Olga Ivanova	Russia	16.67	X	16.97	17.08	17.06	17.73	17.73	
8	Nadine Beckel	Germany	X	17.03	17.40	X	X	17.64	17.64	
