= 2002 European Athletics Indoor Championships – Women's shot put =

The women's shot put event at the 2002 European Athletics Indoor Championships was held on March 2.

== Results ==
Rank	Athlete	Nationality	#1	#2	#3	#4	#5	#6	Result	Note
1st place, gold medalist(s)	Vita Pavlysh	Ukraine	X	19.62	19.76	X	19.33	X	19.76	
2nd place, silver medalist(s)	Assunta Legnante	Italy	17.33	X	X	18.60	X	18.56	18.60	
3rd place, bronze medalist(s)	Lieja Koeman	Netherlands	18.31	18.53	18.46	18.24	18.14	X	18.53	PB
4	Valentina Fedyushina	Austria	17.01	X	17.10	18.23	17.99	X	18.23	
5	Lyudmila Sechko	Russia	17.78	18.14	17.83	17.38	17.86	X	18.14	
6	Elena Hila	Romania	17.13	17.31	17.28	X	17.12	17.52	17.52	
7	Cristiana Checchi	Italy	X	17.19	17.09	17.36	X	X	17.36	PB
