= Katarzyna Żakowicz =

Polish shot putter

Personal information
- Born: 12 February 1975 (age 51) Mońki, Poland

Sport
- Sport: Track and field
Medal record
Representing Poland
Summer Universiade
Bronze medal – third place	2001 Beijing	Shot put

Katarzyna Żakowicz (born 12 February 1975) is a retired Polish athlete who specialised in the shot put. She represented her country at the 2000 Summer Olympics, but failed to qualify for the final.

She has personal bests of 19.28 metres outdoors (2000) and 18.59 metres indoors (2001).

== Competition record ==
Year	Competition	Venue	Position	Event	Notes
Representing Poland
1993	European Junior Championships	San Sebastián, Spain	10th	Shot put	14.20 m
1994	World Junior Championships	Lisbon, Portugal	13th (q)	Shot put	14.69 m
1997	World Indoor Championships	Paris, France	14th (q)	Shot put	16.68 m
1997	European U23 Championships	Turku, Finland	5th	Shot put	17.45 m
1997	Universiade	Catania, Italy	10th	Shot put	16.75 m
1997	Universiade	Catania, Italy	9th	Discus throw	55.24 m
1998	European Championships	Budapest, Hungary	5th	Shot put	18.77 m
1998	European Championships	Budapest, Hungary	22nd (q)	Discus throw	56.99 m
1999	Universiade	Palma de Mallorca, Spain	7th	Shot put	17.89 m
2000	Olympic Games	Sydney, Australia	18th (q)	Shot put	16.95 m
2001	World Indoor Championships	Lisbon, Portugal	6th	Shot put	18.59 m
2001	World Championships	Edmonton, Canada	13th (q)	Shot put	17.71 m
2001	Universiade	Beijing, China	3rd	Shot put	18.31 m
