= 1994 World Junior Championships in Athletics – Women's shot put =

The women's shot put event at the 1994 World Junior Championships in Athletics was held in Lisbon, Portugal, at Estádio Universitário de Lisboa on 20 and 21 July.

== Medalists ==
Gold	Cheng Xiaoyan; China
Silver	Yumileidi Cumbá; Cuba
Bronze	Claudia Mues; Germany

== Results ==
=== Final ===
21 July

Rank	Name	Nationality	Attempts						Result	Notes
Rank	Name	Nationality	1	2	3	4	5	6	Result	Notes
1st place, gold medalist(s)	Cheng Xiaoyan	China	18.76	18.30	x	x	18.61	18.76	18.76	
2nd place, silver medalist(s)	Yumileidi Cumbá	Cuba	17.55	x	17.49	18.09	x	17.68	18.09	
3rd place, bronze medalist(s)	Claudia Mues	Germany	16.23	x	16.62	x	16.82	17.07	17.07	
4	Corrie de Bruin	Netherlands							16.79	
5	Shang Xiaoli	China	15.90	16.74	x	x	16.32	16.47	16.74	
6	Nadine Kleinert	Germany	16.59	x	16.70	x	16.63	16.60	16.70	
7	Alina Pupo	Cuba							16.15	
8	Anna Rauhala	Finland	14.68	x	15.42	15.58	15.21	15.71	15.71	
9	Olga Ryabinkina	Russia	15.31	x	15.13				15.31	
10	Lee Myeong-Seon	South Korea	x	15.07	15.08				15.08	
11	Amy Christiansen	United States	x	14.52	15.06				15.06	
12	Lieja Koeman	Netherlands	14.83	x	x				14.83	

=== Qualifications ===
20 Jul

==== Group A ====
Rank	Name	Nationality	Attempts			Result	Notes
Rank	Name	Nationality	1	2	3	Result	Notes
1	Cheng Xiaoyan	China	17.64	-	-	17.64	Q
2	Nadine Kleinert	Germany	16.60	-	-	16.60	Q
3	Lee Myeong-Seon	South Korea	16.02	-	-	16.02	Q
4	Alina Pupo	Cuba	15.66	-	-	15.66	Q
5	Olga Ryabinkina	Russia	14.78	15.61	-	15.61	Q
6	Lieja Koeman	Netherlands	14.94	15.33	x	15.33	Q
7	Amy Christiansen	United States	14.83	14.50	14.84	14.84	q
8	Katarzyna Żakowicz	Poland	14.68	14.69	x	14.69	
9	Olga Tsander	Belarus	13.74	14.26	x	14.26	
10	Takako Ichikawa	Japan	x	13.19	x	13.19	
	Gülseren Tavan	Turkey	x	x	x	NM	

==== Group B ====
Rank	Name	Nationality	Attempts			Result	Notes
Rank	Name	Nationality	1	2	3	Result	Notes
1	Yumileidi Cumbá	Cuba	17.22	-	-	17.22	Q
2	Claudia Mues	Germany	16.51	-	-	16.51	Q
3	Shang Xiaoli	China	16.04	-	-	16.04	Q
4	Corrie de Bruin	Netherlands	15.85	-	-	15.85	Q
5	Anna Rauhala	Finland	x	x	15.32	15.32	q
6	Agnieszka Ptaszkiewicz	Poland	13.76	14.25	14.55	14.55	
7	Teri Steer	United States	14.09	x	14.46	14.46	
8	Martina de la Puente	Spain	14.12	x	14.40	14.40	
9	Veerle Blondeel	Belgium	13.77	13.89	13.93	13.93	
10	Kylie Standing	Australia	13.15	13.06	13.32	13.32	

== Participation ==
According to an unofficial count, 21 athletes from 15 countries participated in the event.

- Australia (1)
- Belarus (1)
- Belgium (1)
- China (2)
- Cuba (2)
- Finland (1)
- Germany (2)
- Japan (1)
- Netherlands (2)
- Poland (2)
- Russia (1)
- South Korea (1)
- Spain (1)
- Turkey (1)
- United States (2)
