= Elena Hila =

Romanian shot putter

Elena Hila (born 20 May 1974) is a Romanian shot putter. Her personal best throw is 18.73 metres, achieved in May 2002 in Snagov.

== Achievements ==
Year	Competition	Venue	Position	Notes
Representing Romania
1993	European Junior Championships	San Sebastián, Spain	5th	15.58 m
1999	World Championships	Seville, Spain	12th	17.88 m
2001	Jeux de la Francophonie	Ottawa-Hull, Canada	2nd	17.07 m
2001	World Championships	Edmonton, Canada	18th	16.57 m
2001	Universiade	Beijing, China	12th	16.01 m
2002	European Indoor Championships	Vienna, Austria	6th	17.52 m
2002	European Championships	Munich, Germany	11th	17.41 m
2003	World Championships	Paris, France	19th (q)	17.30 m
2005	Jeux de la Francophonie	Niamey, Niger	2nd	15.93 m
