= Yu Xin (athlete) =

Chinese discus thrower (born 1977)

Medal record

Women's athletics

Representing China

Asian Championships
Gold medal – first place	1998 Fukuoka	Discus throw

Yu Xin (born 23 February 1977) is a retired female discus thrower from PR China. Her personal best throw was 64.90 metres, achieved in July 2000 in Jinzhou. She also has 19.32 metres in the shot put.

She won the 1998 Asian Championships and finished thirteenth at the 2000 Olympic Games.

== Achievements ==
Year	Competition	Venue	Position	Notes
Representing China
1998	Asian Championships	Fukuoka, Japan	1st	
2000	Olympic Games	Sydney, Australia	13th	58.34 m (DT)
2000	Olympic Games	Sydney, Australia	24th	16.18 m (SP)
