= Zhang Zhiying =

Chinese shot putter (born 1973)

Medal record

Women's athletics

Representing China

Asian Championships
Silver medal – second place	1995 Jakarta	Shot put

Zhang Zhiying (born 19 July 1973) is a retired Chinese shot putter.

She won the silver medals at the 1992 World Junior Championships and the 1995 Asian Championships.

Her personal best throw is 19.23 metres, achieved in May 1992 in Hangzhou.
