= Nadzeya Astapchuk =

Belarusian shot putter (born 1980)

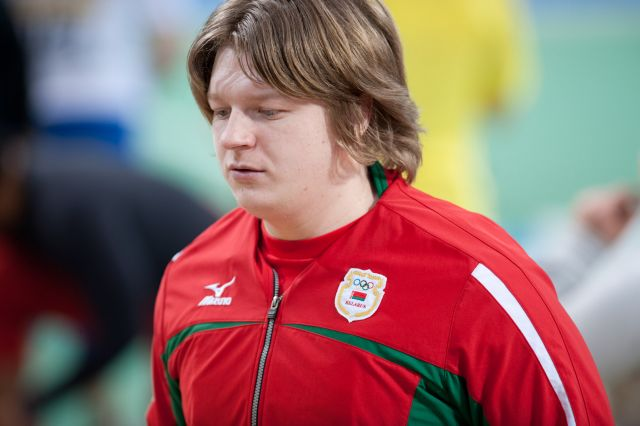
- Astapchuk at the 2010 World Indoor Championships

Personal information
- Native name: Надзея Мікалаеўна Астапчук
- Born: Nadzeya Mikalaeuna Astapchuk; October 28, 1980 (age 46) Bolshiye Orly, Stolin District, Brest Region, Belarus
- Height: 1.80 m (5 ft 11 in)
- Weight: 97 kg (214 lb)

Sport
- Country: Belarus
- Sport: Athletics
- Event: Shot Put
- Coached by: Alexander Yefimov

Achievements and titles
- Personal best: Outdoor: 21.09 m (2005): Indoor: 20.56 m (2003)
Medal record
Women's athletics
Representing Belarus
Olympic Games
Disqualified	2012 London	Shot put
Disqualified	2008 Beijing	Shot put
World Championships
Silver medal – second place	2003 Paris	Shot put
Disqualified	2005 Helsinki	Shot put
Disqualified	2007 Osaka	Shot put
Disqualified	2011 Daegu	Shot put
- Updated on 13 August 2012

Nadzeya Mikalayeuna Astapchuk (Belarusian: Надзе́я Мікала́еўна Астапчу́к; Russian: Наде́жда Никола́евна Остапчу́к, romanized: Nadezhda Nikolayevna Ostapchuk; born October 28, 1980) is a Belarusian shot putter. She briefly was designated the Olympic Champion in 2012, but was subsequently stripped of the title for failing a drug test and the gold medal was awarded to New Zealand shot putter Valerie Adams. She was World Champion in 2005, but in March 2013, the IAAF reported that her drug test sample from that event had been retested and found to be positive.

Astapchuk was initially designated as the bronze medallist at the 2008 Beijing Olympics (but was subsequently disqualified from that too, because of a doping violation), and was the World Indoor and European Champion in 2010. Her overall personal best of 21.70 m that year is the fourth best women's all-time distance indoors. However, IAAF has subsequently disqualified all of her results since August 2005. She is a four-time runner-up at the World Indoor Championships and a three-time World Championships silver medallist outdoors. She holds the Championship record for the former event, with her winning throw of 20.85 m in 2010. In continental competition, she was the 2005 European Indoor champion and came second at the 2006 European Athletics Championships. In addition to her withdrawn medals in Beijing and London, she was fourth at the 2004 Athens Olympics before the disqualification of Svetlana Krivelyova. Though upgraded to third place in Athens, the IOC declined to award her a bronze medal.

== Career ==
Born in Stolin, she was initially interested in basketball but the lack of a local team left her unable to pursue the sport further. Astapchuk instead entered throwing events and her first international title came at the age of seventeen, as she won the shot put at the 1998 World Junior Championships in Athletics. She was dominant at the younger levels and won at the 1999 European Athletics Junior Championships and then the 2001 European Athletics U23 Championships.

She rose to top international level in the early 2000s, winning two consecutive silver medals at the IAAF World Indoor Championships and also finished as runner-up at the 2003 World Championships in Athletics. She finished fourth at her first Summer Olympics in 2004, but reached the peak of her discipline the following year, winning at the 2005 European Athletics Indoor Championships and then becoming 2005 World Champion. Her career became overshadowed by Valerie Adams, who succeeded her as World Champion in 2007, although she continued to win major medals, including silvers at the World Indoor and Outdoor Championships and a bronze medal at the 2008 Beijing Olympics.

Prior to the disqualification of all of her athletics results since August 2005, her personal best was 21.70 m thrown at the Belarusian championships in 2010, which made her the third best indoor thrower on the all-time lists. She scored her first world indoor title at the 2010 IAAF World Indoor Championships, throwing a championship record of 20.85 m. She won further honours at the 2010 European Cup Winter Throwing meeting, easily winning gold ahead of compatriot Natallia Mikhnevich. She defeated the reigning champion, Natallia Mikhnevich, at the 2010 European Athletics Championships to claim her first outdoor European Championship. She won all six of the IAAF Diamond League meetings that she competed in that year, becoming the inaugural women's shot put trophy winner, and suffered just one defeat in the entirety of 2010 – a runner-up placing behind Valerie Adams at the 2010 IAAF Continental Cup.

She decided to miss the indoor section of 2011 and instead struck a balance between training and resting her left knee. She had endured ongoing pain in the joint but remarked "I didn’t want to do something radical and have surgery as there is no guarantee of a speedy recovery". Her first competition of 2012 came at the Belarusian indoor championships and she demonstrated her form with a world-leading mark of 20.70 m. She had a best throw of 20.42 m at the 2012 IAAF World Indoor Championships and this brought her the silver medal behind Adams.

Turning to the outdoor season, she won at the 2012 European Cup Winter Throwing and reached 20.53 m to win the first leg of the 2012 Diamond League in Doha. She managed only third at the Golden Gala at the end of May, but threw a Belarusian outdoor record of 21.13 m in Minsk two weeks later. She threw further in July, having marks of 21.32 m, then 21.39 m in Grodno. Immediately prior to the Olympics, she had a world-leading throw of 21.58 m.

During the 2020–21 Belarusian protests, Astapchuk became a member of the Coordination Council of Sviatlana Tsikhanouskaya.

== Doping ==
Astapchuk won gold at the 2012 Summer Olympics in London, the day after which the President of Belarus, Alexander Lukashenko, awarded her the Third-class Order of the Fatherland in recognition of her “high professionalism, outstanding sports achievements and victory at the 30th Summer Olympic Games”. However, she was later disqualified from the medal for testing positive for a banned substance. She was tested twice, once on 5 August and again the following day after she had finished first. The IOC said both samples indicated the presence of the anabolic agent metenolone. New Zealand's Valerie Adams was subsequently awarded the gold. Russia's Yevgeniya Kolodko was moved up to win the silver medal (and was eventually disqualified for doping as well and stripped of her medal), and China's Gong Lijiao moved to take the bronze medal. She received a one-year ban after her coach, Alexander Yefimov, admitted to spiking her coffee with metenolone without her knowledge after being worried about her performance, stating that he thought the drug would be clear before the tests were administered.

In March 2013, Astapchuk was stripped of her 2005 World Championship title after samples from the 2005 event were retested by the IAAF. In 2014 IAAF announced that she was sanctioned to four years ineligibility, ending 14 August 2016, and that her results from 13 August 2005 to 12 August 2007 and since 5 August 2012 were annulled.

On 12 January 2017 it was announced that because of a doping violation she had been disqualified from the 2008 Olympic Games.

== Achievements ==
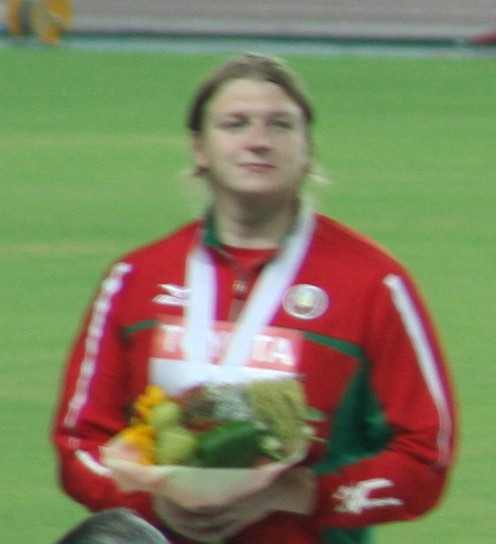
Astapchuk receiving her silver medal at the 2007 World Championships

Year	Competition	Venue	Position	Notes
Representing Belarus
1998	World Junior Championships	Annecy, France	1st	18.23 m (=PB)
1999	European Junior Championships	Riga, Latvia	1st	18.20 m
1999	World Championships	Seville, Spain	19th (q)	17.47 m
2000	European Indoor Championships	Ghent, Belgium	6th	18.65 m
2001	World Indoor Championships	Lisbon, Portugal	2nd	19.24 m (=PB)
2001	European U23 Championships	Amsterdam, Netherlands	1st	19.73 m
2001	World Championships	Edmonton, Canada	7th	18.98 m
2002	European Championships	Munich, Germany	5th	19.07 m
2003	World Indoor Championships	Birmingham, United Kingdom	2nd	20.31 m
2003	World Championships	Paris, France	2nd	20.12 m (=PB)
2003	World Athletics Final	Monte Carlo, Monaco	3rd	19.51 m
2004	World Indoor Championships	Budapest, Hungary	7th	18.33 m
2004	Olympic Games	Athens, Greece	4th	19.01 m
2004	World Athletics Final	Monte Carlo, Monaco	1st	19.23 m
2005	European Indoor Championships	Madrid, Spain	1st	19.37 m
2005	World Championships	Helsinki, Finland	DSQ	Failed drugs test
2005	World Athletics Final	Monte Carlo, Monaco	DSQ	
2006	World Indoor Championships	Moscow, Russia	DSQ	18.13 m
2006	European Championships	Gothenburg, Sweden	DSQ	19.42 m
2007	World Championships	Osaka, Japan	2nd	20.48 m
2007	World Athletics Final	Stuttgart, Germany	1st	20.45
2008	World Indoor Championships	Valencia, Spain	2nd	19.74 m
2008	Olympic Games	Beijing, China	DSQ	19.86 m
2010	World Indoor Championships	Doha, Qatar	DSQ	Failed drugs test
2010	European Cup Winter Throwing	Arles, France	1st	20.16 m
2010	European Championships	Barcelona, Spain	1st	20.48 m
2010	Continental Cup	Split, Croatia	2nd	20.18 m
2011	World Championships	Daegu, South Korea	2nd	20.05 m
2012	World Indoor Championships	Istanbul, Turkey	2nd	20.42 m
2012	Olympic Games	London, United Kingdom	DSQ	Failed drug test
