= Yoko Toyonaga =

Japanese shot putter

Yoko Toyonaga (豊永 陽子, Toyonaga Yōko; born 15 April 1977) is a Japanese shot putter.

She finished eighth at the 1999 World Indoor Championships and fourth at the 2005 Asian Championships. She also competed at the World Championships in 2005 and 2007 without reaching the finals.

Her personal best throw is 17.57 metres, achieved in June 2004 in Tottori.
