= Iolanta Ulyeva =

Kazakhstani shot putter (born 1976)

Medal record

Women's athletics

Representing Kazakhstan

Asian Indoor Championships
Silver medal – second place	2004 Tehran	Shot put
Silver medal – second place	2008 Doha	Shot put

Iolanta Yevgenyevna Ulyeva (Russian: Иоланта Евгеньевна Ульева; born 27 July 1976 in Karaganda) is a female shot putter from Kazakhstan. Her personal best throw is 17.82 metres, achieved in August 2000 in Almaty.

She finished eighth at the 2001 Summer Universiade and seventh at both the 2003 Asian Championships and the 2005 Asian Championships. In addition she competed at the World Championships in 2001 and 2003 and the Olympic Games in 2000m 2004 and 2008 without reaching the final. without reaching the final round.

== Achievements ==
Year	Competition	Venue	Position	Notes
Representing Kazakhstan
2000	Olympic Games	Sydney, Australia	21st (q)	16.38 m
2001	East Asian Games	Osaka, Japan	3rd	16.92 m
2001	World Championships	Edmonton, Canada	19th (q)	16.22 m
2001	Universiade	Beijing, China	8th	16.42 m
2002	Asian Championships	Colombo, Sri Lanka	5th	15.85 m
2003	Asian Championships	Manila, Philippines	7th	16.54 m
2004	Asian Indoor Championships	Tehran, Iran	2nd	16.78 m
2004	Olympic Games	Athens, Greece	35th (q)	14.88 m
2005	Asian Championships	Incheon, South Korea	7th	16.01 m
2006	Asian Games	Doha, Qatar	5th	16.39 m
2007	World Championships	Osaka, Japan	27th (q)	15.52 m
2008	Asian Indoor Championships	Doha, Qatar	2nd	15.99 m
2008	Olympic Games	Beijing, China	32nd (q)	15.49 m
