= Elisângela Adriano =

Brazilian athlete (born 1972)

Personal information
- Full name: Elisângela Maria Adriano
- Nationality: Brazil
- Born: July 27, 1972 (age 54) São Paulo, Brazil
- Height: 1.80 m (5 ft 11 in)
- Weight: 96 kg (212 lb)

Sport
- Sport: Athletics
Medal record
Women's Athletics
Representing Brazil
Pan American Games
Silver medal – second place	2003 Santo Domingo	Shot Put
Bronze medal – third place	2007 Rio de Janeiro	Discus throw
Summer Universiade
Bronze medal – third place	1999 Palma de Mallorca	Shot Put
Bronze medal – third place	1999 Palma de Mallorca	Discus throw
South American Youth Championships
Gold medal – first place	1988 Cuenca	Discus throw
Silver medal – second place	1988 Cuenca	Shot put
- Updated on 9 May 2013

Elisângela Maria Adriano (born July 27, 1972), is a Brazilian shot putter and discus thrower, whose personal best put is 19.30 metres, achieved in July 2001 in Tunja. Her personal best discus throw is 62.00 metres, achieved in May 2011 in São Caetano do Sul.

== Career ==
Adriano was born in São Paulo. In 1999 she was suspended by the IAAF for a two-year period, but she was later reinstated before time. She competed in both the discus and shot put at the 2007 World Championships in Athletics, without reaching the final in either event. She also competed in the discus at the 2008 Summer Olympics and the 2009 World Championships in Athletics.

She won the discus and shot put events at the 2009 Brazilian national championships. She holds the South American record in both events. She won her seventh continental discus title at the 2009 South American Championships in Athletics with a championship record of 61 metres. She also won the shot put silver medal behind Chilean Natalia Ducó. She added the 2009 Lusophony Games shot put gold to her list of honours the following month. In the 2010 season, she won the discus gold at the 2010 Ibero-American Championships and later gained her fourteenth national title in the discus at the Troféu Brasil de Atletismo.

She holds the shot put national record both indoors and out.

== Achievements ==
Year	Competition	Venue	Position	Event	Notes
Representing Brazil
1987	South American Junior Championships	Santiago, Chile	4th	Shot put	12.14 m
1987	South American Junior Championships	Santiago, Chile	11th	Discus throw	29.78 m
1988	South American Junior Championships	Cubatão, Brazil	3rd	Shot put	13.04 m
1988	South American Youth Championships	Cuenca, Ecuador	2nd	Shot put	12.85 m A
1988	South American Youth Championships	Cuenca, Ecuador	1st	Discus throw	42.60 m A
1989	South American Junior Championships	Montevideo, Uruguay	1st	Shot put	14.40 m
1989	South American Junior Championships	Montevideo, Uruguay	3rd	Discus throw	42.70 m
1989	Pan American Junior Championships	Santa Fe, Argentina	3rd	Shot put	13.16 m
1989	Pan American Junior Championships	Santa Fe, Argentina	8th	Discus throw	41.16 m
1990	South American Junior Championships	Bogotá, Colombia	1st	Shot put	16.06 m
1990	South American Junior Championships	Bogotá, Colombia	1st	Discus throw	48.18 m
1990	Ibero-American Championships	Manaus, Brazil	1st	Shot put	16.65 m
1990	Ibero-American Championships	Manaus, Brazil	3rd	Discus throw	50.10 m
1990	World Junior Championships	Plovdiv, Bulgaria	10th	Shot put	15.03 m
1990	World Junior Championships	Plovdiv, Bulgaria	19th (q)	Discus	47.10 m
1991	South American Junior Championships	Asunción, Paraguay	1st	Shot put	16.12 m
1991	South American Junior Championships	Asunción, Paraguay	1st	Discus throw	51.06 m
1991	South American Championships	Manaus, Brazil	2nd	Shot put	16.04 m
1991	Pan American Junior Championships	Kingston, Jamaica	3rd	Shot put	15.71 m
1991	Pan American Junior Championships	Kingston, Jamaica	2nd	Discus throw	51.40 m
1991	Pan American Games	Havana, Cuba	5th	Shot put	15.77 m
1991	Pan American Games	Havana, Cuba	–	Discus throw	NM
1991	World Championships	Tokyo, Japan	20th (q)	Shot put	15.93 m
1992	Ibero-American Championships	Seville, Spain	2nd	Shot put	16.75 m
1992	Ibero-American Championships	Seville, Spain	9th	Discus	43.54 m
1993	South American Championships	Lima, Peru	1st	Shot put	16.47 m
1993	South American Championships	Lima, Peru	2nd	Discus throw	53.16 m
1993	World Championships	Stuttgart, Germany	22nd (q)	Shot put	16.41 m
1994	Ibero-American Championships	Mar del Plata, Argentina	2nd	Shot put	16.77 m
1994	Ibero-American Championships	Mar del Plata, Argentina	6th	Discus	50.20 m
1995	Pan American Games	Mar del Plata, Argentina	5th	Shot put	16.74 m
1995	Pan American Games	Mar del Plata, Argentina	6th	Discus throw	53.30 m
1995	South American Championships	Manaus, Brazil	1st	Shot put	17.37 m
1995	South American Championships	Manaus, Brazil	4th	Discus throw	42.58 m
1995	Universiade	Fukuoka, Japan	4th	Shot put	17.15 m
1995	Universiade	Fukuoka, Japan	10th	Discus throw	52.14 m
1996	Ibero-American Championships	Medellín, Colombia	2nd	Shot put	17.90 m
1996	Ibero-American Championships	Medellín, Colombia	2nd	Discus throw	57.10 m
1996	Olympic Games	Atlanta, United States	21st (q)	Shot put	16.49 m
1997	World Indoor Championships	Paris, France	11th	Shot put	17.45 m
1997	South American Championships	Mar del Plata, Argentina	1st	Shot put	18.16 m
1997	South American Championships	Mar del Plata, Argentina	1st	Discus throw	58.46 m
1997	World Championships	Athens, Greece	19th (q)	Shot put	17.71 m
1997	World Championships	Athens, Greece	18th (q)	Discus throw	57.88 m
1997	Universiade	Catania, Italy	5th	Shot put	17.88 m
1997	Universiade	Catania, Italy	5th	Discus throw	57.56 m
1998	Ibero-American Championships	Lisbon, Portugal	1st	Shot put	18.38 m
1998	Ibero-American Championships	Lisbon, Portugal	2nd	Discus throw	58.94 m
1998	World Cup	Johannesburg, South Africa	8th	Discus throw	51.26 m
1999	South American Championships	Bogotá, Colombia	1st	Shot put	19.02 m (A)
1999	South American Championships	Bogotá, Colombia	1st	Discus throw	60.27 m (A)
1999	Universiade	Palma, Spain	3rd	Shot put	18.17 m
1999	Universiade	Palma, Spain	3rd	Discus throw	62.23 m
1999	Pan American Games	Winnipeg, Canada	–	Shot put	DQ
1999	Pan American Games	Winnipeg, Canada	–	Discus throw	DQ
2001	South American Championships	Manaus, Brazil	1st	Shot put	17.93 m
2001	South American Championships	Manaus, Brazil	1st	Discus throw	58.40 m
2001	World Championships	Edmonton, Canada	11th	Shot put	18.06 m
2002	Ibero-American Championships	Guatemala City, Guatemala	3rd	Shot put	16.63 m
2002	Ibero-American Championships	Guatemala City, Guatemala	1st	Discus throw	58.20 m
2002	World Cup	Madrid, Spain	8th	Discus throw	53.60 m
2003	South American Championships	Barquisimeto, Venezuela	1st	Shot put	18.34 m
2003	South American Championships	Barquisimeto, Venezuela	1st	Discus throw	58.37 m
2003	Pan American Games	Santo Domingo, Dom. Rep.	2nd	Shot put	18.48 m
2003	Pan American Games	Santo Domingo, Dom. Rep.	5th	Discus throw	58.80 m
2003	World Championships	Paris, France	9th	Shot put	18.11 m
2003	World Championships	Paris, France	18th (q)	Discus throw	57.69 m
2003	World Athletics Final	Monte Carlo, Monaco	7th	Shot put	17.92 m
2004	World Indoor Championships	Budapest, Hungary	18th (q)	Shot put	16.64 m
2004	Ibero-American Championships	Huelva, Spain	3rd	Shot put	17.79 m
2004	Ibero-American Championships	Huelva, Spain	4th	Discus throw	57.21 m
2004	Olympic Games	Athens, Greece	17th (q)	Shot put	17.44 m
2004	Olympic Games	Athens, Greece	26th (q)	Discus throw	58.13 m
2005	World Championships	Helsinki, Finland	20th (q)	Shot put	16.94 m
2006	Ibero-American Championships	Ponce, Puerto Rico	1st	Shot put	16.99 m
2006	Ibero-American Championships	Ponce, Puerto Rico	1st	Discus throw	58.67 m
2006	South American Championships	Tunja, Colombia	1st	Shot put	17.37 m
2006	South American Championships	Tunja, Colombia	1st	Discus throw	56.18 m
2007	South American Championships	São Paulo, Brazil	1st	Shot put	17.41 m
2007	South American Championships	São Paulo, Brazil	1st	Discus throw	59.85 m
2007	Pan American Games	Rio de Janeiro, Brazil	6th	Shot put	17.73 m
2007	Pan American Games	Rio de Janeiro, Brazil	3rd	Discus throw	60.27 m
2007	World Championships	Osaka, Japan	19th (q)	Shot put	17.07 m
2007	World Championships	Osaka, Japan	22nd (q)	Discus throw	57.21 m
2008	Ibero-American Championships	Iquique, Chile	3rd	Discus throw	52.82 m
2008	Olympic Games	Beijing, China	19th (q)	Discus throw	58.84 m
2009	South American Championships	Lima, Peru	2nd	Shot put	16.63 m
2009	South American Championships	Lima, Peru	1st	Discus throw	61.00 m
2009	Lusophony Games	Lisbon, Portugal	1st	Shot put	17.02 m
2009	World Championships	Berlin, Germany	29th (q)	Discus throw	55.75 m
2010	Ibero-American Championships	San Fernando, Spain	1st	Discus throw	58.86 m
2011	South American Championships	Buenos Aires, Argentina	2nd	Shot put	16.55 m
2011	World Championships	Daegu, South Korea	22nd (q)	Discus throw	56.45 m
2011	Pan American Games	Guadalajara, Mexico	8th	Discus throw	54.08 m
