= Oksana Gaus =

Russian shot putter (born 1981)

Oksana Vladimirovna Gaus (Russian: Окса́на Влади́мировна Га́ус, born 27 July 1981 in Dushanbe) is a Russian shot putter.

She finished tenth at the 2006 European Championships. She also competed at the 2007 World Championships without reaching the finals.

Her personal best throw is 18.78 metres, achieved in July 2006 in Tula.
