= Yu Juan =

Chinese educator

Yu Juan (Chinese: 于娟; pinyin: Yú Juān; 1979-April 19, 2011) was a teacher in Fudan University and the writer of the book An Unfinished Life (此生未完成). Yu Juan was diagnosed with breast cancer at the age of 30. During her fight with cancer, her persistent efforts to the public for cancer prevention touched millions of people through her popular blog called To Live is the Permanent Truth.

== Personal life ==
Born in Jining, Shandong, Yu Juan earned her Master degree from Universitetet i Oslo in Norway, and Ph.D. from Fudan University. She led a happy life in a family with her husband and son, but when she was in the prime of her career, she was diagnosed with breast cancer.

During the time she was hospitalized with the disease, she created a blog called To Live is the Truth (活着就是王道). She kept a diary about her thoughts on life. As she said, from the perspective of a patient with cancer, a valuable thing in life was an optimistic state of mind and a valuable time was when you stay with your family, while other things were less significant. Her focus on life and her public writing reached many readers. As a person interested in helping others, she used her recovery time to keep the diary to remind people of habits that might relate to cancer.

=== Social effect ===
After one and a half years’ illness, Yu Juan died on April 19, 2011. The matter received news coverage, and thousands of people sent their wishes for Yujuan. To everyone’s surprise, her final wish was to protect energy forests in northeast China. Her family collected her articles and published the book An Unfinished Life in her memory.
