= Larisa Peleshenko =

Russian shot putter (born 1964)

Personal information
- Born: 29 February 1964 (age 62) Slantsy, Soviet Union
- Height: 6 ft 0.5 in (1.84 m)

Sport
- Country: Russia
- Sport: Women's athletics
- Club: CSKA St. Petersburg
- Coached by: Nadezhda Chizhova

Achievements and titles
- Personal best: 21.46 m (2000)
Medal record
Representing Soviet Union
European Indoor Championships
Silver medal – second place	1988 Budapest	Shot put
Summer Universiade
Bronze medal – third place	1987 Zagreb	Shot put
Representing Russia
Olympic Games
Silver medal – second place	2000 Sydney	Shot put
World Indoor Championships
Gold medal – first place	2001 Lisbon	Shot put
Goodwill Games
Gold medal – first place	2001 Brisbane	Shot put
European Indoor Championships
Gold medal – first place	2000 Ghent	Shot put
Silver medal – second place	1994 Paris	Shot put
Silver medal – second place	1988 Budapest	Shot put

Larisa Alexandrovna Peleshenko (Russian: Лариса Александровна Пелешенко, née Agapova on 29 February 1964) is a retired Russian shot putter best known for winning the Olympic silver medal in 2000. In her early career she won European Indoor silver medals, but in February 1995 she received a four-year drugs ban. Having originally won the 1995 World Indoor Championships, she lost the medal. She won the 2001 Indoor Championships and finished fourth at the World Championships the same year, and retired at the end of the season.

== International competitions ==
Year	Competition	Venue	Position	Event	Result	Notes
Representing the Soviet Union
1988	European Indoor Championships	Budapest, Hungary	2nd	Shot put	20.23 m	
1990	Goodwill Games	Seattle, United States	5th	Shot put	18.67 m	
Representing Russia
1993	World Championships	Stuttgart, Germany	9th	Shot put	19.22 m	
1994	Goodwill Games	Saint Petersburg, Russia	5th	Shot put	19.05 m	
1994	European Indoor Championships	Paris, France	2nd	Shot put	19.16 m	
1994	European Championships	Helsinki, Finland	5th	Shot put	19.01 m	
2000	European Indoor Championships	Ghent, Belgium	1st	Shot put	20.15 m	
2000	Summer Olympics	Sydney, Australia	2nd	Shot put	19.92 m	
2001	Goodwill Games	Brisbane, Australia	1st	Shot put	18.65 m	
2001	World Indoor Championships	Lisbon, Portugal	1st	Shot put	19.84 m	

== See also ==
- List of doping cases in athletics
- List of Olympic medalists in athletics (women)
- List of 2000 Summer Olympics medal winners
- List of IAAF World Indoor Championships medalists (women)
- List of European Athletics Indoor Championships medalists (women)
- List of masters athletes
- Shot put at the Olympics
