= Jesseca Cross =

American track and field athlete (born 1975)

Personal information
- Born: October 5, 1975 (age 51) New Orleans, LA, United States

Sport
- Sport: Track and field

Jesseca H. Cross (born October 5, 1975) is a former track and field athlete from the United States who specialized in throwing events. She attended the University of Wyoming on a basketball scholarship, and then competed for the United States in the hammer throw and shot put at the 2000 Summer Olympics. She did not progress beyond the qualification round in either event.

Cross was inducted into the Wyoming Sports Hall of Fame in 2002. She was the interim head women's volleyball coach at Northwest College in Powell, Wyoming for the 2007 fall semester. Flavia Siqueira was hired as the permanent coach in March 2008.

== Achievements ==
| Year | Competition | Venue | Position | Notes |
|---|---|---|---|---|
| 2000 | Summer Olympics | Sydney, Australia | 19th | 60.58 m (HT) |
| 2000 | Summer Olympics | Sydney, Australia | 17th | 17.27 m (SP) |
