= Tressa Thompson =

American shot putter (born 1975)

Personal information
- Born: May 6, 1975 (age 51) Bloomfield, Nebraska, U.S.

Sport
- Sport: Athletics
- Event: Shot put
Medal record
Representing United States
Summer Universiade
Bronze medal – third place	1997 Catania	Shot put

Tressa Thompson (born May 6, 1975) is an American shot putter.

== Career ==
Thompson is a three-time NCAA shot put champion from the University of Nebraska in the late 1990s. In the early 1990s, she won several high school shot put state titles. In 2000, she placed second at the USA Indoor shot put competition.

== Personal life ==
Just before Thompson was due to go to the 2000 USA Olympics Trials, she tested positive for cocaine and methamphetamine.

Her addictions became the focus of an episode of the A&E television series Intervention. Following the show, Thompson was sent to a 90-day intensive in-patient therapy known as "Hope By The Sea". She also reportedly went from the treatment facility to a sober living facility to continue her sobriety.

In 2016, Thompson opened a training center to focus on building better athletes.

In 2022, she was sentenced to jail for meth possession.
