= Kristin Heaston =

American shot putter (born 1975)

Personal information
- Nationality: United States
- Born: Kristin L. Heaston; November 23, 1975 (age 50) Walnut Creek, California
- Height: 6 ft 0 in (1.83 m)
- Weight: 276 lb (125 kg)

Sport
- Sport: Track and field
- Event: Shot put
- College team: University of Florida
- Club: Nike

Kristin L. Heaston (born November 23, 1975, in Walnut Creek, California) is a female shot putter from the United States.

Originally competing for the Florida Gators track and field team, Heaston transferred to the California Golden Bears track and field program after learning her father was suffering from brain cancer.

Heaston was a participant in the 2008 Olympic Games where she placed 23rd in the qualifying round with a throw of 17.34 m (56 ft 10.68 in). Prior to her Olympic appearance, she was a runner-up at the Olympic Trials with a throw of 18.34 m (60 ft 2.05 in).

In 2003 Heaston became the American indoor and outdoor shot put champion. At the 2004 Olympic Games Heaston became the first woman ever to compete at the ancient site Olympia. In 2005, she became American outdoor shot put champion for the second time.

She finished thirteenth at the 2001 Summer Universiade and seventh at the 2006 World Athletics Final and the 2007 World Athletics Final.

Her personal best throw is 18.74 m (61 ft 5.80 in), achieved in June 2007 in Indianapolis.

== International competitions ==
| Year | Competition | Venue | Position | Notes |
Representing the United States
| 1992 | World Junior Championships | Seoul, South Korea | 17th (q) | 14.00 m |
| 2001 | Universiade | Beijing, China | 13th | 15.61 m |
| 2003 | Pan American Games | Santo Domingo, Dominican Republic | 7th | 16.55 m |
| 2003 | World Championships | Paris, France | 22nd (q) | 16.70 m |
| 2004 | Olympic Games | Athens, Greece | 21st | 17.17 m |
| 2007 | Pan American Games | Rio de Janeiro, Brazil | 5th | 17.88 m |

== See also ==
- Florida Gators
- List of University of Florida Olympians
