= Yanina Karolchyk-Pravalinskaya =

Belarusian shot putter (born 1976)

Personal information
- Nationality: Belarusian
- Born: 26 December 1976 (age 49) Grodno, Soviet Union
- Height: 1.84 m (6 ft 1/2 in)
- Weight: 88 kg (194 lb)

Sport
- Country: Belarus
- Sport: Athletics
- Event: Shot Put

Achievements and titles
- Personal best: 20.61 m (2001)
Medal record
Women's Athletics
Representing Belarus
Olympic Games
Gold medal – first place	2000 Sydney	Shot put
World Championships
Gold medal – first place	2001 Edmonton	Shot put
European Championships
Bronze medal – third place	1998 Budapest	Shot put
- Updated on 6 August 2012

Yanina Karolchyk-Pravalinskaya (Belarusian: Яніна Карольчык-Правалінская, née Karolchyk, born 26 December 1976) is a Belarusian shot putter who won an Olympic gold medal at the 2000 Summer Olympics in Sydney, Australia, and a gold medal at the 2001 World Championships in Edmonton, Alberta.

In June 2003, at a meet in Germany, Korolchik tested positive for the steroid clenbuterol. She was banned for two years and missed the 2004 Summer Olympics.

She threw her longest distance in nine years in her 2010 season opener at the Olympic Champions Trophy meeting in Minsk, recording a best mark of 19.95 m.

Karolchyk is married to Belarusian singer Uladzimer Pravalinski.

== Achievements ==
Year	Competition	Venue	Position	Event	Notes
Representing Belarus
1995	European Junior Championships	Nyíregyháza, Hungary	2nd	Shot put	16.95 m
1997	European U23 Championships	Turku, Finland	3rd	Shot put	17.98 m
1997	European U23 Championships	Turku, Finland	3rd	Discus	56.36 m
1997	World Championships	Athens, Greece	18th	Shot put	17.75 m
1998	European Championships	Budapest, Hungary	3rd	Shot put	19.23 m PB
1999	World Championships	Seville, Spain	4th	Shot put	19.17 m
2000	Summer Olympics	Sydney, Australia	1st	Shot put	20.56 m PB
2001	World Indoor Championships	Lisbon, Portugal	9th	Shot put	17.52 m
2001	World Championships	Edmonton, Canada	1st	Shot put	20.61 m PB
2003	World Indoor Championships	Birmingham, England	7th	Shot put	18.94 m
2007	World Championships	Osaka, Japan	10th	Shot put	18.17 m
2008	Summer Olympics	Beijing, China	18th	Shot put	17.79 m
2010	European Championships	Barcelona, Spain	4th	Shot put	19.29 m
2012	Summer Olympics	London, Great Britain	17th	Shot put	17.87 m
