= Lieja Tunks =

Canadian-Dutch shot putter

Lieja Koeman
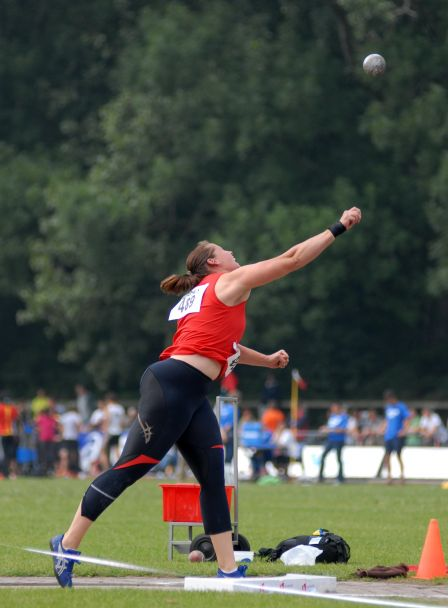

Personal information
- Full name: Liesbeth Jantina Koeman
- Born: 10 March 1976 (age 50) Purmerend, Netherlands
- Years active: 1984-present
- Height: 1.83 m (6 ft 0 in)
- Weight: 100 kg (220 lb)

Achievements and titles
- Personal bests: shot put – 18.82 (2003) discus throw – 58.93 (2002) hammer throw – 42.79 (2001)
Medal record
Representing Netherlands
European Indoor Championships
Bronze medal – third place	2002 Vienna	Shot put
- Updated on 21 March 2008

Liesbeth "Lieja" Jantina Koeman, formerly Lieja Tunks, (born 10 March 1976 in Purmerend, North Holland) is a shot putter, who represents Canada after switching from the Netherlands in 2006.

Her personal best throw is 18.82 metres, achieved in June 2003 in Arnhem.

== Achievements ==
Year	Competition	Venue	Position	Event	Notes
Representing the Netherlands
1994	World Junior Championships	Lisbon, Portugal	12th	Shot put	14.83 m
1994	World Junior Championships	Lisbon, Portugal	17th (q)	Discus	43.20 m
1997	European U23 Championships	Turku, Finland	6th	Shot put	16.82 m
1997	European U23 Championships	Turku, Finland	6th	Discus	54.62 m
1999	World Championships	Seville, Spain	20th	Shot put	17.45 m
2000	Olympic Games	Sydney, Australia	9th	Shot put	17.96 m
2001	World Championships	Edmonton, Canada	12th	Shot put	17.89 m
2002	European Indoor Championships	Vienna, Austria	3rd	Shot put	18.53 m
2002	European Championships	Munich, Germany	10th	Shot put	17.54 m
2003	World Championships	Paris, France	10th	Shot put	17.99 m
2004	Olympic Games	Olympia, Greece	11th	Shot put	18.14 m
2004	World Athletics Final	Monte Carlo, Monaco	3rd	Shot put	18.11 m
2005	European Indoor Championships	Madrid, Spain	5th	Shot put	17.76 m
2005	World Championships	Helsinki, Finland	9th	Shot put	17.83 m
Representing Canada

Awards
Preceded by Corrie de Bruin	KNAU Cup; 1999, 2000	Succeeded by Letitia Vriesde
Preceded by Carole Thate	Amsterdam Sportswoman of the Year; 2000	Succeeded by Mieke de Boer
