= 1995 IAAF World Indoor Championships – Women's shot put =

The women's shot put event at the 1995 IAAF World Indoor Championships was held on 11 March.

== Doping disqualification ==
Larisa Peleshenko of Russia originally won the event and was awarded the gold medal, but was later disqualified for doping.

== Results ==
Rank	Name	Nationality	#1	#2	#3	#4	#5	#6	Results	Notes
1st place, gold medalist(s)	Kathrin Neimke	Germany	18.97	x	19.40	18.37	19.35	19.25	19.40	
2nd place, silver medalist(s)	Connie Price-Smith	United States	18.30	x	19.12	17.94	x	x	19.12	
3rd place, bronze medalist(s)	Grit Hammer	Germany	18.48	18.94	18.92	19.02	18.68	18.96	19.02	
4	Zhang Liuhong	China	18.84	x	x	x	17.91	x	18.84	
5	Sui Xinmei	China	18.57	18.74	x	18.81	18.78	18.77	18.81	
6	Valentina Fedyushina	Ukraine	18.48	x	x	x	x	x	18.48	
7	Mihaela Oana	Romania	17.71	18.07	17.93	17.73	x	17.99	18.07	
8	Judy Oakes	Great Britain	17.77	x	x				17.77	
9	Nataša Erjavec	Slovenia	17.22	17.41	x				17.41	
10	Corrie De Bruin	Netherlands	16.90	16.66	16.88				16.90	
11	Eileen Vanisi	United States	16.10	x	x				16.10	
(1)	Larisa Peleshenko	Russia	(19.69)	(x)	(19.76)	(19.49)	(19.93)	(19.48)	(19.93)	DQ
