= 1997 IAAF World Indoor Championships – Women's shot put =

The women's shot put event at the 1997 IAAF World Indoor Championships was held on March 8.

== Medalists ==
Gold	Silver	Bronze
Vita Pavlysh; Ukraine	Astrid Kumbernuß; Germany	Irina Korzhanenko; Russia

== Results ==
=== Qualification ===
Qualification: 18.00 (Q) or at least 12 best performers (q) qualified for the final.

Rank	Group	Athlete	Nationality	#1	#2	#3	Result	Notes
1	B	Vita Pavlysh	Ukraine	20.22			20.22	Q
2	B	Astrid Kumbernuß	Germany	18.80			18.80	Q
3	B	Irina Korzhanenko	Russia	18.71			18.71	Q
4	B	Krystyna Zabawska	Poland	17.63	18.54		18.54	Q
5	A	Stephanie Storp	Germany	18.49			18.49	Q
6	B	Judy Oakes	Great Britain	x	17.86	18.31	18.31	Q, SB
7	A	Elisângela Adriano	Brazil	17.20	x	18.31	18.31	Q
8	B	Huang Zhihong	China	18.23			18.23	Q
9	A	Connie Price-Smith	United States	17.71	x	17.85	17.85	q
10	A	Corrie de Bruin	Netherlands	17.59	x	17.70	17.70	q
11	B	Mara Rosolen	Italy	17.60	x	17.17	17.60	q
12	A	Zhang Liuhong	China	17.36	17.21	17.27	17.36	q
13	B	Margarita Ramos	Spain	16.88	x	x	16.88	
14	A	Katarzyna Żakowicz	Poland	16.68	x	15.92	16.68	
15	B	Valeyta Althouse	United States	x	16.63	x	16.63	
16	A	Kalliopi Ouzouni	Greece	16.45	x	16.59	16.59	
	A	Svetlana Krivelyova	Russia				DNS	

=== Final ===
Rank	Name	Nationality	#1	#2	#3	#4	#5	#6	Result	Notes
1st place, gold medalist(s)	Vita Pavlysh	Ukraine	19.08	20.00	19.99	–	19.72	20.00	20.00	
2nd place, silver medalist(s)	Astrid Kumbernuß	Germany	19.51	19.62	19.44	19.72	19.92	19.71	19.92	
3rd place, bronze medalist(s)	Irina Korzhanenko	Russia	19.40	–	19.49	–	19.45	–	19.49	PB
4	Stephanie Storp	Germany	18.62	–	–	18.80	–	–	18.80	SB
5	Huang Zhihong	China	18.46	18.33	18.56	18.19	18.67	18.40	18.67	
6	Connie Price-Smith	United States	17.87	–	18.38	–	18.15	–	18.38	
7	Mara Rosolen	Italy	18.37	–	17.98	–	17.79	–	18.38	
8	Zhang Liuhong	China	18.29	–	–	–	–	–	18.29	
9	Krystyna Zabawska	Poland	–	18.18	17.71				18.18	
10	Judy Oakes	Great Britain	17.51	–	–				17.51	
11	Elisângela Adriano	Brazil	17.45	–	–				17.45	
12	Corrie de Bruin	Netherlands	17.28	17.36	–				17.36	
