= 1992 European Athletics Indoor Championships – Women's shot put =

The women's shot put event at the 1992 European Athletics Indoor Championships was held in Palasport di Genova on 1 March.

== Results ==
Rank	Name	Nationality	#1	#2	#3	#4	#5	#6	Result	Notes
1st place, gold medalist(s)	Natalya Lisovskaya	Unified Team	20.18	19.98	x	20.70	x	x	20.70	
2nd place, silver medalist(s)	Svetla Mitkova	Bulgaria	19.38	19.78	x	19.66	20.06	19.83	20.06	
3rd place, bronze medalist(s)	Astrid Kumbernuss	Germany	18.92	18.88	18.54	18.99	19.05	19.37	19.37	
4	Valentina Fedyushina	Unified Team	x	18.95	x	x	x	x	18.95	
5	Anna Romanova	Unified Team	18.79	18.37	x	18.62	x	18.71	18.79	
6	Danguolé Urbikiené	Lithuania	18.45	18.32	x	x	x	18.55	18.55	
7	Grit Hammer	Germany	17.89	17.58	17.48	17.45	17.57	x	17.89	
8	Mihaela Oana	Romania	17.64	17.61	17.61	17.77	17.65	17.60	17.77	
9	Agnese Maffeis	Italy	x	16.76	x				16.76	
10	Heike Hopfer	Germany	16.13	x	16.28				16.28	
11	Mara Rosolen	Italy	16.01	x	16.26				16.26	
12	Teresa Machado	Portugal	x	15.80	x				15.80	
