= Athletics at the 1987 Summer Universiade – Women's shot put =

The women's shot put event at the 1987 Summer Universiade was held at the Stadion Maksimir in Zagreb on 15 July 1987.

== Results ==
Rank	Athlete	Nationality	Result	Notes
1st place, gold medalist(s)	Natalya Lisovskaya	Soviet Union	20.48	
2nd place, silver medalist(s)	Kathrin Neimke	East Germany	20.07	
3rd place, bronze medalist(s)	Larisa Peleshenko	Soviet Union	19.49	
4	Livia Mehes	Romania	19.28	
5	Vera Schmidt	West Germany	18.11	
6	Sui Xinmei	China	17.87	
7	Pamela Dukes	United States	17.59	
8	Connie Price	United States	17.49	
9	Rozalija Nađ	Yugoslavia	16.45	
10	Melody Torcolacci	Canada	16.16	
11	Helen Weidum	Suriname	13.53	
12	Deepika Rodrigo	Sri Lanka	11.50	
