= 1993 IAAF World Indoor Championships – Women's shot put =

The women's shot put event at the 1993 IAAF World Indoor Championships was held on 14 March.

== Results ==
Rank	Name	Nationality	#1	#2	#3	#4	#5	#6	Result	Notes
1st place, gold medalist(s)	Svetlana Krivelyova	Russia	19.48	19.57	x	19.40	x	19.53	19.57	
2nd place, silver medalist(s)	Stephanie Storp	Germany	19.37	x	18.70	18.90	x	18.55	19.37	
3rd place, bronze medalist(s)	Zhang Liuhong	China	19.05	19.09	x	19.18	19.22	19.32	19.32	
4	Valentina Fedyushina	Ukraine	18.32	18.63	18.45	19.07	x	x	19.07	
5	Anna Romanova	Russia	18.62	x	18.79	x	18.91	18.94	18.94	
6	Li Xiaoyun	China	18.71	18.72	x	x	18.90	x	18.90	
7	Belsy Laza	Cuba	x	18.75	18.61	x	x	x	18.75	
8	Kathrin Neimke	Germany	18.50	x	x	17.93	x	x	18.50	
9	Connie Price-Smith	United States	17.84	x	18.10				18.10	
10	Lisette Martínez	Cuba	17.31	17.22	17.47				17.47	
11	Mihaela Oana	Romania	17.47	x	x				17.47	
