= 1991 IAAF World Indoor Championships – Women's shot put =

The women's shot put event at the 1991 IAAF World Indoor Championships was held on 10 March.

All three medalists threw a distance of twenty metres or more, which would not be repeated again until 2025.

== Results ==
Rank	Name	Nationality	#1	#2	#3	#4	#5	#6	Result	Notes
1st place, gold medalist(s)	Sui Xinmei	China	18.61	19.21	19.76	20.32	20.54	19.78	20.54	CR
2nd place, silver medalist(s)	Huang Zhihong	China	19.68	19.57	20.33	19.57	20.30	x	20.33	PB
3rd place, bronze medalist(s)	Natalya Lisovskaya	Soviet Union	18.10	18.12	x	19.96	20.00	x	20.00	
4	Stephanie Storp	Germany	x	19.43	19.09	x	x	x	19.43	
5	Belsis Laza	Cuba	18.27	18.70	18.83	18.54	18.55	18.91	18.91	
6	Kathrin Neimke	Germany	18.77	18.67	x	x	18.67	x	18.77	
7	Connie Price-Smith	United States	17.73	17.54	18.59	17.51	17.98	17.95	18.59	
8	Svetlana Krivelyova	Soviet Union	18.55	x	x	18.58	x	18.23	18.58	
9	Ramona Pagel	United States	14.95	16.96	18.09				18.09	
10	Mihaela Oana	Romania	15.71	16.50	17.14				17.14	
11	Krystyna Danilczyk	Poland	15.87	16.04	15.39				16.04	
	Hanane Ahmed Khaled	Egypt							DNS	
