= 1997 World Championships in Athletics – Women's shot put =

These are the official results of the women's shot put event at the 1997 IAAF World Championships in Athens, Greece. There were a total number of 25 participating athletes, with the final held on Thursday, August 7, 1997. The qualification mark was set at 19.00 metres.

== Medalists ==
Gold	Astrid Kumbernuss; Germany (GER)
Silver	Vita Pavlysh; Ukraine (UKR)
Bronze	Stephanie Storp; Germany (GER)

== Schedule ==
- All times are Eastern European Time (UTC+2)

Qualification Round
Group A	Group B
05.08.1997 – 19:45h	05.08.1997 – 19:45h
Final Round
07.08.1997 – 18:30h

== Abbreviations ==
- All results shown are in metres

Q	automatic qualification
q	qualification by rank
DNS	did not start
NM	no mark
WR	world record
AR	area record
NR	national record
PB	personal best
SB	season best

== Records ==
Standing records prior to the 1997 World Athletics Championships
World Record	Natalya Lisovskaya (URS)	22.63 m	June 7, 1987	Moscow, Soviet Union
Event Record	Natalya Lisovskaya (URS)	21.24 m	September 5, 1987	Rome, Italy

== Qualification ==
=== Group A ===
Rank	Overall	Athlete	Attempts			Distance	Note
Rank	Overall	Athlete	1	2	3	Distance	Note
1	5	Connie Price-Smith (USA)	18.00	18.35	X	18.35 m	
2	6	Nadine Kleinert (GER)	16.89	17.87	18.26	18.26 m	
3	7	Stephanie Storp (GER)	18.12	X	X	18.12 m	
4	12	Valeyta Althouse (USA)	17.89	17.03	17.36	17.89 m	
5	13	Mara Rosolen (ITA)	16.49	16.84	17.87	17.87 m	
6	15	Zhang Liuhong (CHN)	17.82	17.68	17.67	17.82 m	
7	16	Irina Korzhanenko (RUS)	X	X	17.80	17.80 m	
8	19	Elisângela Adriano (BRA)	X	17.38	17.71	17.71 m	
9	20	Valentina Fedyushina (UKR)	17.31	X	17.19	17.31 m	
10	21	Laurence Manfredi (FRA)	X	16.92	17.02	17.02 m	
11	23	Lee Myung-Sun (KOR)	16.38	16.39	X	16.39 m	
—	—	Kalliopi Ouzouni (GRE)	X	X	X	NM	

=== Group B ===
Rank	Overall	Athlete	Attempts			Distance	Note
Rank	Overall	Athlete	1	2	3	Distance	Note
1	1	Astrid Kumbernuss (GER)	20.69	—	—	20.69 m	
2	2	Vita Pavlysh (UKR)	20.48	—	—	20.48 m	
3	3	Huang Zhihong (CHN)	19.05	—	—	19.05 m	
4	4	Svetlana Krivelyova (RUS)	X	18.41	X	18.41 m	
5	8	Svetla Mitkova (BUL)	17.60	18.07	18.04	18.07 m	
6	9	Tressa Thompson (USA)	16.37	18.07	X	18.07 m	
7	10	Krystyna Danilczyk-Zabawska (POL)	X	X	18.05	18.05 m	
8	11	Li Meisu (CHN)	17.72	X	17.99	17.99 m	
9	14	Judy Oakes (GBR)	17.78	X	17.84	17.84 m	
10	17	Anna Romanova (RUS)	17.79	17.79	X	17.79 m	
11	18	Yanina Korolchik (BLR)	17.44	17.42	17.75	17.75 m	
12	22	Eleni Tsentemeidou (GRE)	16.62	X	X	16.62 m	
13	24	Nada Kawar (JOR)	15.76	15.45	15.14	15.76 m	

== Final ==
Rank	Athlete	Attempts						Distance	Note
Rank	Athlete	1	2	3	4	5	6	Distance	Note
1st place, gold medalist(s)	Astrid Kumbernuss (GER)	20.59	20.71	20.52	20.24	X	20.70	20.71 m	
2nd place, silver medalist(s)	Vita Pavlysh (UKR)	X	20.57	X	20.51	20.36	20.66	20.66 m	
3rd place, bronze medalist(s)	Stephanie Storp (GER)	19.22	18.84	X	18.67	X	18.92	19.22 m	
4	Huang Zhihong (CHN)	18.63	18.64	18.72	19.15	X	19.07	19.15 m	
5	Connie Price-Smith (USA)	19.00	18.17	18.64	X	18.53	X	19.00 m	
6	Li Meisu (CHN)	17.30	18.62	18.21	18.58	18.10	18.50	18.62 m	
7	Nadine Kleinert (GER)	18.33	18.42	X	17.91	18.22	X	18.42 m	
8	Krystyna Danilczyk-Zabawska (POL)	X	X	17.83	X	17.55	X	17.83 m	
9	Svetla Mitkova (BUL)	17.75	17.51	17.62				17.75 m	
10	Svetlana Krivelyova (RUS)	X	17.08	17.38				17.38 m	
11	Valeyta Althouse (USA)	16.92	X	16.78				16.92 m	
12	Tressa Thompson (USA)	X	16.48	X				16.48 m	

== See also ==
- 1996 Women's Olympic Shot Put
- 1997 Shot Put Year Ranking
