= 1998 European Athletics Indoor Championships – Women's shot put =

The women's shot put event at the 1998 European Athletics Indoor Championships was held on 28 February 1998.

== Results ==
Rank	Athlete	Nationality	#1	#2	#3	#4	#5	#6	Result	Notes
1st place, gold medalist(s)	Irina Korzhanenko	Russia	x	18.73	18.65	18.89	19.59	20.25	20.25	
2nd place, silver medalist(s)	Vita Pavlysh	Ukraine	18.29	19.55	19.58	18.42	20.00	x	20.00	
3rd place, bronze medalist(s)	Corrie de Bruin	Netherlands	18.54	18.45	18.71	18.92	18.58	18.97	18.97	NR
4	Krystyna Danilczyk	Poland	17.66	18.65	18.13	18.24	18.44	18.81	18.81	
5	Nadine Kleinert	Germany	18.31	18.17	18.29	17.97	18.36	18.42	18.42	
6	Judy Oakes	Great Britain	17.44	18.32	x	18.42	18.14	17.94	18.42	
7	Svetla Mitkova	Bulgaria	17.67	18.01	17.92	18.00	18.35	x	18.35	
8	Mihaela Oana	Romania	17.81	18.08	17.96	17.85	x	x	18.08	
9	Lieja Koeman	Netherlands	17.94	17.03	x				17.94	
10	Kalliopi Ouzouni	Greece	16.98	17.07	17.47				17.47	
11	Agnese Maffeis	Italy	x	17.09	16.67				17.09	
12	Mara Rosolen	Italy	16.40	16.68	16.67				16.68	
13	Margarita Ramos	Spain	16.63	x	x				16.63	
14	Daniela Čurović	Yugoslavia	16.13	16.09	16.61				16.61	
15	Nataša Erjavec	Slovenia	16.28	16.40	16.38				16.40	
16	Laurence Manfredi	France	16.29	x	16.37				16.37	
17	Martina de la Puente	Spain	16.30	x	x				16.30	
