= 2003 European Cup (athletics) =

- Dates: 21–22 June
- Host city: Florence, Italy
- Venue: Stadio Luigi Ridolfi
- Level: Senior
- Type: Outdoor
- Events: 40

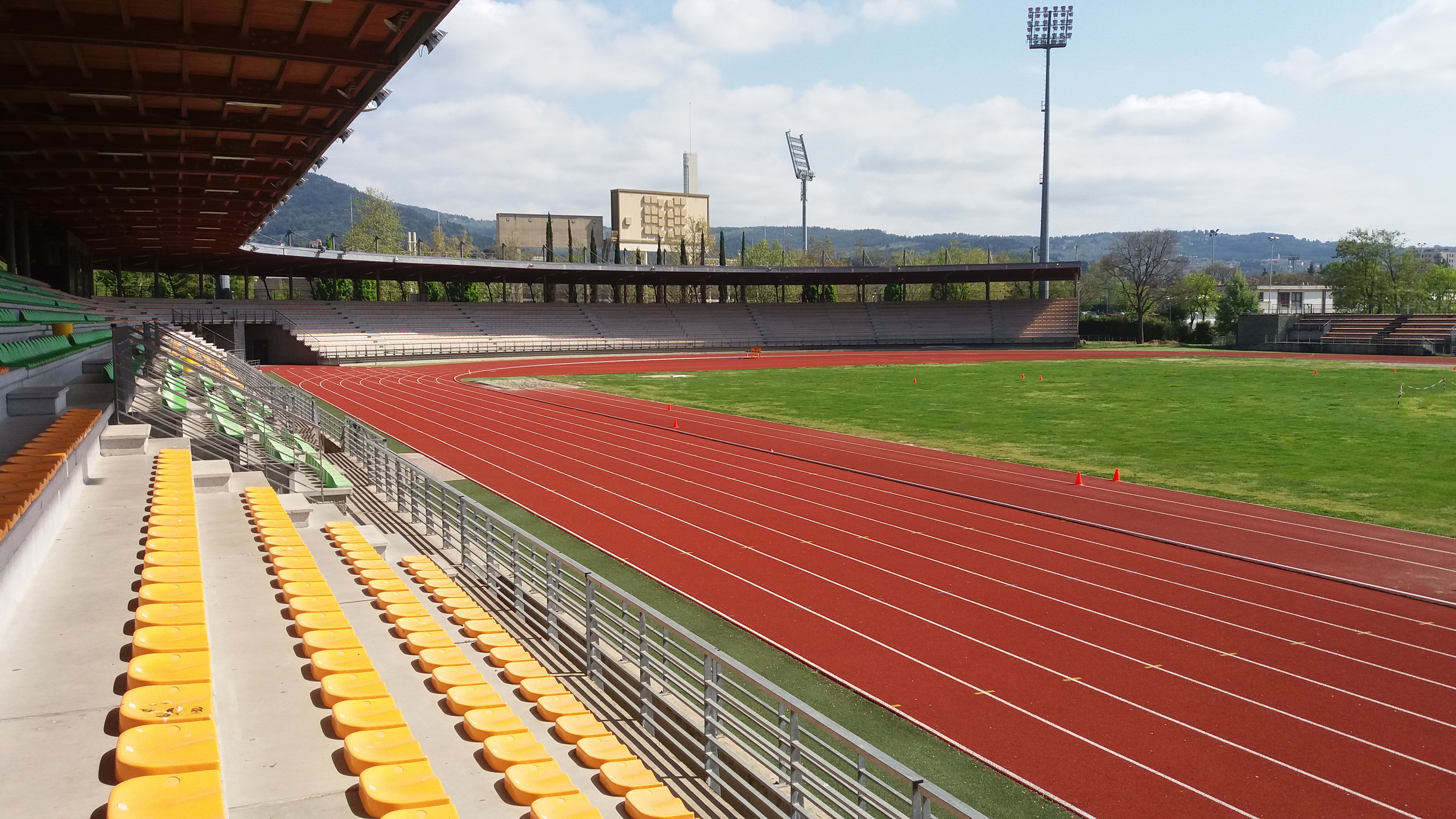
Host stadium in Florence

The 2003 European Cup was the 24th edition of the European Cup of athletics.

The Super League Finals were held in Florence, Italy.

== Super League ==
Held on 21 and 22 June in Florence, Italy

=== Team standings ===
Men
Pos.	Nation	Points
1	France	109
2	Germany	100.5
3	Great Britain	96
4	Russia	92
5	Italy	84
6	Poland	83
7	Spain	80
8	Greece	74.5

Women
Pos.	Nation	Points
1	Russia	130
2	Germany	103
3	France	102
4	Great Britain	83
5	Spain	82
6	Greece	78.5
7	Romania	77.5
8	Italy	62

Top six teams qualified for the 2004 European Indoor Cup.

=== Results summary ===
==== Men's events ====
Event	Gold		Silver		Bronze	
100 m (Wind: -1.0 m/s)	Mark Lewis-Francis; Great Britain	10.22	Aimé-Issa Nthépé; France	10.36	Aristotelis Gavelas; Greece	10.44
200 m (Wind: -2.3 m/s)	Konstantinos Kenteris; Greece	20.37	Christian Malcolm; Great Britain	20.45	Marcin Jędrusiński; Poland	20.53
400 m	Marc Raquil; France	44.88	Ingo Schultz; Germany	45.19	Iwan Thomas; Great Britain	45.58
800 m	Antonio Manuel Reina; Spain	1:48.13	Florent Lacasse; France	1:48.37	René Herms; Germany	1:49.15
1500 m	Juan Carlos Higuero; Spain	3:49.16	Mirosław Formela; Poland	3:49.22	Michael East; Great Britain	3:49.60
3000 m	Fouad Chouki; France	8:22.56	Carles Castillejo; Spain	8:22.79	Vyacheslav Shabunin; Russia	8:23.18
5000 m	Ismaïl Sghyr; France	13:43.70	Jesús España; Spain	13:44.68	Dieter Baumann; Germany	13:45.55
3000 m steeplechase	Pavel Potapovich; Russia	8:26.28	Radosław Popławski; Poland	8:29.70	Angelo Iannelli; Italy	8:30.40
110 m hurdles (Wind: -0.2 m/s)	Ladji Doucouré; France	13.55	Mike Fenner; Germany	13.58	Andrea Giaconi; Italy	13.66
400 m hurdles	Chris Rawlinson; Great Britain	48.45	Periklis Iakovakis; Greece	49.23	Ruslan Mashchenko; Russia	49.43
4 × 100 m	Italy; Francesco Scuderi; Simone Collio; Massimiliano Donati; Alessandro Cavallaro	38.42	Poland; Marcin Krzywański; Łukasz Chyła; Marcin Jędrusiński; Marcin Urbaś	38.45	Great Britain; Christian Malcolm; Darren Campbell; Marlon Devonish; Julian Golding	38.60
4 × 400 m	Great Britain; Chris Rawlinson; Tim Benjamin; Jamie Baulch; Matt Elias	3:02.43	Greece; Stilianos Dimotsios; Anastasios Gousis; Dimitrios Tsomos; Periklis Iakovakis	3:02.69	Germany; Ingo Schultz; Sebastian Gatzka; Ruwen Faller; Bastian Swillims	3:02.83
High jump	Yaroslav Rybakov; Russia	2.34	Alessandro Talotti; Italy	2.30	Grzegorz Sposób; Poland	2.27
Pole vault	Romain Mesnil; France	5.75	Giuseppe Gibilisco; Italy	5.70	Lars Börgeling; Germany	5.70
Long jump	Louis Tsatoumas; Greece	8.06	Yago Lamela; Spain	7.96	Nils Winter; Germany	7.85
Triple jump	Fabrizio Donato; Italy	17.16	Julien Kapek; France	16.59	Christos Meletoglou; Greece	16.52
Shot put	Manuel Martínez; Spain	21.08	Carl Myerscough; Great Britain	20.72	Pavel Chumachenko; Russia	20.12
Discus throw	Dmitriy Shevchenko; Russia	65.39	Michael Möllenbeck; Germany	65.26	Andrzej Krawczyk; Poland	61.27
Hammer throw	Karsten Kobs; Germany	80.63	Wojciech Kondratowicz; Poland	78.37	Alexandros Papadimitriou; Greece	78.11
Javelin throw	Sergey Makarov; Russia	85.86	Christian Nicolay; Germany	81.93	Dariusz Trafas; Poland	79.36
WR world record | AR area record | CR championship record | GR games record | NR national record | OR Olympic record | PB personal best | SB season best | WL world leading (in a given season)

==== Women's events ====
Event	Gold		Silver		Bronze	
100 m (Wind: -1.3 m/s)	Christine Arron; France	11.07	Marina Kislova; Russia	11.19	Glory Alozie; Spain	11.29
200 m (Wind: -0.4 m/s)	Anastasiya Kapachinskaya; Russia	22.71	Ionela Tîrlea; Romania	22.78	Muriel Hurtis; France	22.89
400 m	Svetlana Pospelova; Russia	50.85	Lee McConnell; Great Britain	51.37	Chrysoula Goudenoudi; Greece	52.11
800 m	Claudia Gesell; Germany	2:00.85	Maria Cioncan; Romania	2:01.02	Mayte Martínez; Spain	2:01.63
1500 m	Natalia Rodríguez; Spain	4:07.18	Helen Clitheroe; Great Britain	4:08.18	Konstantina Efentaki; Greece	4:09.06
3000 m	Olga Yegorova; Russia	8:55.73	Hayley Tullett; Great Britain	8:57.45	Sabrina Mockenhaupt; Germany	8:57.69
5000 m	Yelena Zadorozhnaya; Russia	15:34.07	Joanne Pavey; Great Britain	15:35.31	Mihaela Botezan; Romania	15:39.63
3000 m steeplechase	Gulnara Samitova; Russia	9:40.89; CR	Cristina Casandra; Romania	9:48.47	Élodie Olivarès; France	9:54.51
100 m hurdles (Wind: -0.1 m/s)	Glory Alozie; Spain	12.86	Svetlana Laukhova; Russia	12.88	Patricia Girard; France	12.95
400 m hurdles	Ionela Tîrlea; Romania	54.47	Natasha Danvers; Great Britain	55.01	Heike Meissner; Germany	55.22
4 × 100 m	France; Patricia Girard; Muriel Hurtis; Fabé Dia; Christine Arron	42.62	Germany; Melanie Paschke; Gabi Rockmeier; Esther Möller; Marion Wagner	42.62	Russia; Olga Fedorova; Irina Khabarova; Marina Kislova; Larisa Kruglova	43.11
4 × 400 m	Russia; Natalya Lavshuk; Natalya Ivanova; Tatyana Firova; Svetlana Pospelova	3:26.02	Great Britain; Helen Karagounis; Katharine Merry; Catherine Murphy; Lee McConnell	3:26.52	France; Francine Landre; Dado Kamissoko; Solen Désert; Marie-Louise Bévis	3:28.39
High jump	Daniela Rath; Germany	2.00	Ruth Beitia; Spain	1.95	Marina Kuptsova; Russia	1.95
Pole vault	Annika Becker; Germany	4.50	Tatyana Polnova; Russia	4.45	Marie Poissonnier; France	4.35
Long jump	Eunice Barber; France	6.76	Concepción Montaner; Spain	6.69	Fiona May; Italy	6.67
Triple jump	Anna Pyatykh; Russia	14.79	Magdelín Martínez; Italy	14.76	Adelina Gavrilă; Romania	14.45
Shot put	Astrid Kumbernuss; Germany	19.46	Svetlana Krivelyova; Russia	18.98	Laurence Manfrédi; France	17.97
Discus throw	Ekaterini Vogoli; Greece	62.11	Mélina Robert-Michon; France	61.67	Natalya Sadova; Russia	61.59
Hammer throw	Manuela Montebrun; France	74.43	Mihaela Melinte; Romania	71.99	Olga Kuzenkova; Russia	69.89
Javelin throw	Steffi Nerius; Germany	63.30	Mirela Manjani; Greece	63.13	Claudia Coslovich; Italy	62.70
WR world record | AR area record | CR championship record | GR games record | NR national record | OR Olympic record | PB personal best | SB season best | WL world leading (in a given season)

== First League ==
The First League was held on 21 and 22 June

=== Men ===
Group A
Held in Lappeenranta, Finland

Pos.	Nation	Points
1	Sweden	125
2	Finland	113
3	Hungary	104
4	Belgium	89
5	Belarus	83
6	Norway	77
7	Denmark	67
8	Estonia	60

Group B
Held in Velenje, Slovenia

Pos.	Nation	Points
1	Netherlands	121
2	Ukraine	115
3	Czech Republic	110
4	Portugal	100
5	Slovenia	82
6	Bulgaria	67.5
7	Israel	63
8	Slovakia	60.5

=== Women ===
Group A
Held in Lappeenranta, Finland

Pos.	Nation	Points
1	Poland	125
2	Finland	104
3	Sweden	104
4	Belarus	100
5	Hungary	99
6	Belgium	81.5
7	Ireland	58
8	Lithuania	47.5

Group B
Held in Velenje, Slovenia

Pos.	Nation	Points
1	Ukraine	125
2	Czech Republic	104
3	Portugal	96
4	Netherlands	92
5	Bulgaria	87
6	Slovenia	86
7	Slovakia	67
8	Serbia and Montenegro	58

The winners of each group also qualified for the 2004 European Indoor Cup.

== Second League ==
The Second League was held on 21 and 22 June

=== Men ===
Group A
Held in Århus, Denmark

Pos.	Nation	Points
1	Switzerland	131
2	Austria	121
3	Ireland	114
4	Lithuania	103
5	Latvia	86
6	Luxembourg	57.5
7	Iceland	53
8	AASSE	47.5

Group B
Held in Istanbul, Turkey

Pos.	Nation	Points
1	Romania	209
2	Croatia	183
3	Turkey	175.5
4	Cyprus	164
5	Serbia and Montenegro	162
6	Moldova	121
7	Bosnia and Herzegovina	114
8	Azerbaijan	106
9	Armenia	103.5
10	Georgia	103
11	Albania	75
12	Macedonia	15

=== Women ===
Group A
Held in Århus, Denmark

Pos.	Nation	Points
1	Switzerland	122
2	Latvia	117
3	Austria	114.5
4	Norway	111
5	Denmark	101.5
6	Iceland	81
7	AASSE	38
8	Luxembourg	27

Group B
Held in Istanbul, Turkey

Pos.	Nation	Points
1	Estonia	212.5
2	Turkey	203
3	Israel	183
4	Croatia	169
5	Cyprus	151
6	Moldova	138
7	Georgia	98
8	Bosnia and Herzegovina	90
9	Armenia	88.5
10	Azerbaijan	76
11	Albania	74
12	Macedonia	15

== See also ==
- 2003 European Athletics Indoor Cup
