= Athletics at the 1995 Summer Universiade – Women's shot put =

The women's shot put event at the 1995 Summer Universiade was held on 1–2 September at the Hakatanomori Athletic Stadium in Fukuoka, Japan.

== Medalists ==
Gold	Silver	Bronze
Wu Xianchun; China	Cheng Xiaoyan; China	Corrie de Bruin; Netherlands

== Results ==
=== Qualification ===
Qualification: 15.00 m (Q) or at least 12 best (q) qualified for the final.

Rank	Group	Athlete	Nationality	#1	#2	#3	Result	Notes
1	B	Cheng Xiaoyan	China	16.95			16.95	Q
2	A	Wu Xianchun	China	16.86			16.86	Q
3	A	Valeyta Althouse	United States	16.69			16.69	Q
4	B	Corrie de Bruin	Netherlands	16.58			16.58	Q
5	A	Claudia Mues	Germany	16.52			16.52	Q
6	B	Elisângela Adriano	Brazil	16.34			16.34	Q
7	A	Nataša Erjavec	Slovenia	16.19			16.19	Q
8	A	Martina de la Puente	Spain	16.17			16.17	Q
9	B	Dawn Dumble	United States	15.94			15.94	Q
10	B	Georgette Reed	Canada	14.86	15.26		15.26	Q
11	B	Maria Tranchina	Italy	15.26			15.26	Q
12	B	Kalliopi Ouzouni	Greece	x	x	15.17	15.17	Q
13	A	Hiroko Shinozaki	Japan	15.15			15.15	Q
14	A	Alexandra Amaro	Brazil	x	x	15.08	15.08	Q
15	A	Satu Lundahl	Finland	15.00			15.00	Q
16	A	Juli Elders	Canada	13.13	13.38	14.01	14.01	
17	B	Miyoko Nakanishi	Japan	13.15	x	13.43	13.43	
18	B	Ana Lucía Espinoza	Guatemala	9.02	9.19	9.60	9.60	
19	A	Yee Liliene Mey	Macau	7.43	x	8.04	8.04	
	B	Christina Matafa	American Samoa				DNS	
	B	Oluchi Elochi Okoh	Nigeria				DNS	

=== Final ===
Rank	Athlete	Nationality	#1	#2	#3	#4	#5	#6	Result	Notes
1st place, gold medalist(s)	Wu Xianchun	China	17.92	x	17.64	17.35	18.22	18.31	18.31	
2nd place, silver medalist(s)	Cheng Xiaoyan	China	17.95	x	17.47	17.48	x	x	17.95	
3rd place, bronze medalist(s)	Corrie de Bruin	Netherlands	16.91	16.90	17.82	16.91	17.58	17.53	17.82	
4	Elisângela Adriano	Brazil	16.14	16.60	17.15	16.35	x	16.68	17.15	
5	Nataša Erjavec	Slovenia	15.84	16.47	16.90	x	x	x	16.90	
6	Martina de la Puente	Spain	15.84	15.91	16.65	–	–	–	16.65	
7	Claudia Mues	Germany	15.56	15.82	15.91	16.15	x	16.12	16.15	
8	Satu Lundahl	Finland	15.99	15.84	15.73	x	15.63	x	15.99	
9	Valeyta Althouse	United States	x	15.78	x				15.78	
10	Dawn Dumble	United States	14.80	15.51	14.82				15.51	
11	Georgette Reed	Canada	14.32	x	15.41				15.41	
12	Alexandra Amaro	Brazil	x	14.77	15.34				15.34	
13	Maria Tranchina	Italy	15.27	x	14.98				15.27	
	Kalliopi Ouzouni	Greece	x	x	x				NM	
	Hiroko Shinozaki	Japan	x	x	x				NM	
