= 2001 European Athletics U23 Championships – Women's shot put =

The women's shot put event at the 2001 European Athletics U23 Championships was held in Amsterdam, Netherlands, at Olympisch Stadion on 12 July.

== Medalists ==
Gold	Nadezhda Ostapchuk; Belarus
Silver	Lucica Ciobanu; Romania
Bronze	Kathleen Kluge; Germany

== Results ==
=== Final ===
12 July

Rank	Name	Nationality	Attempts						Result	Notes
Rank	Name	Nationality	1	2	3	4	5	6	Result	Notes
1st place, gold medalist(s)	Nadezhda Ostapchuk	Belarus	x	19.16	x	19.73	x	x	19.73	CR
2nd place, silver medalist(s)	Lucica Ciobanu	Romania	17.59	x	16.97	16.77	17.21	x	17.59	
3rd place, bronze medalist(s)	Kathleen Kluge	Germany	16.99	16.76	16.77	16.44	x	17.06	17.06	
4	Irini Terzoglou	Greece	16.41	16.82	16.77	x	16.87	16.64	16.87	
5	Anna Tolokina	Russia	x	16.32	x	x	15.92	16.14	16.32	
6	Svetlana Shevchenko	Ukraine	16.01	15.84	16.25	15.71	16.28	16.23	16.28	
7	Katja Krol	Germany	16.11	15.68	x	15.68	16.06	15.48	16.11	
8	Oksana Zakharchuk	Ukraine	16.08	16.00	15.93	15.07	16.00	x	16.08	
9	Aline Schäffel	Germany	15.79	15.44	15.84				15.84	
10	Julie Dunkley	Great Britain	15.79	x	x				15.79	
11	Magnolia Iglesias	Spain	x	14.90	14.43				14.90	
12	Mojca Črnigoj	Slovenia	13.67	13.90	14.30				14.30	

=== Qualifications ===
12 July
Qualifying 16.30 or 12 best to the Final

==== Group A ====
Rank	Name	Nationality	Result	Notes
1	Irini Terzoglou	Greece	16.96	Q
2	Lucica Ciobanu	Romania	16.87	Q
3	Nadezhda Ostapchuk	Belarus	16.83	Q
4	Kathleen Kluge	Germany	16.55	Q
5	Oksana Zakharchuk	Ukraine	15.66	q
6	Julie Dunkley	Great Britain	15.52	q
7	Mojca Črnigoj	Slovenia	15.03	q
8	Rūta Rakštytė	Lithuania	14.48	
9	Marie-Chantal Kancel	France	14.41	

==== Group B ====
Rank	Name	Nationality	Result	Notes
1	Svetlana Shevchenko	Ukraine	16.34	Q
2	Anna Tolokina	Russia	16.17	q
3	Katja Krol	Germany	16.02	q
4	Aline Schäffel	Germany	15.76	q
5	Magnolia Iglesias	Spain	15.32	q
6	Karolina Konkolewska	Poland	14.80	
7	Gaëlle Eléléara	France	13.71	
8	Nárcicz Lukóczki	Hungary	12.91	

== Participation ==
According to an unofficial count, 17 athletes from 13 countries participated in the event.

- Belarus (1)
- France (2)
- Germany (3)
- Great Britain (1)
- Greece (1)
- Hungary (1)
- Lithuania (1)
- Poland (1)
- Romania (1)
- Russia (1)
- Slovenia (1)
- Spain (1)
- Ukraine (2)
