= Athletics at the 1991 Summer Universiade – Women's shot put =

The women's shot put event at the 1991 Summer Universiade was held at the Don Valley Stadium in Sheffield on 24 July 1991.

== Results ==
Rank	Athlete	Nationality	#1	#2	#3	#4	#5	#6	Result	Notes
1st place, gold medalist(s)	Sui Xinmei	China	19.59	19.67	19.94	19.92	19.43	19.64	19.94	
2nd place, silver medalist(s)	Svetlana Krivelyova	Soviet Union							19.62	
3rd place, bronze medalist(s)	Zhou Tianhua	China							19.23	
4	Agnes Deselaers	Germany							17.32	
5	Manuela Torazza	Italy							15.50	
6	Elli Evangelidou	Cyprus							15.11	
7	Rachel Lewis	United States							15.08	
8	Maria Tranchina	Italy							14.72	
9	Christy Barrett	United States							14.28	
