= 1989 IAAF World Indoor Championships – Women's shot put =

Hungarian sporting event

The women's shot put event at the 1989 IAAF World Indoor Championships was held at the Budapest Sportcsarnok in Budapest on 5 March.

== Results ==
Rank	Name	Nationality	#1	#2	#3	#4	#5	#6	Result	Notes
1st place, gold medalist(s)	Claudia Losch	West Germany	20.10	20.35	20.00	20.45	19.85	20.21	20.45	
2nd place, silver medalist(s)	Huang Zhihong	China	19.58	20.25	19.94	19.98	19.99	x	20.25	PB
3rd place, bronze medalist(s)	Christa Wiese	East Germany	18.02	17.99	17.55	18.32	19.75	19.48	19.75	
4	Stephanie Storp	West Germany	x	18.67	19.63	x	x	x	19.63	
5	Heike Hartwig	East Germany	x	18.20	x	19.07	19.26	19.44	19.44	
6	Belsy Laza	Cuba							19.32	NR
7	Soňa Vašíčková	Czechoslovakia							18.52	
8	Li Meisu	China							18.08	
9	Ramona Pagel	United States							17.71	
10	Connie Price	United States							17.47	
11	Viktória Horváth	Hungary							17.10	
12	Agnese Maffeis	Italy							16.95	
13	Hanane Ahmed Khaled	Egypt							15.05	NR
