= 1994 European Athletics Indoor Championships – Women's shot put =

The women's shot put event at the 1994 European Athletics Indoor Championships was held in Palais Omnisports de Paris-Bercy on 13 March.

== Results ==
Rank	Name	Nationality	#1	#2	#3	#4	#5	#6	Result	Notes
1st place, gold medalist(s)	Astrid Kumbernuß	Germany	19.44	x	18.68	18.82	18.93	19.33	19.44	
2nd place, silver medalist(s)	Larisa Peleshenko	Russia	18.99	18.87	x	x	19.13	19.16	19.16	
3rd place, bronze medalist(s)	Svetla Mitkova	Bulgaria	18.56	18.78	x	19.09	18.89	18.98	19.09	
4	Anna Romanova	Russia	18.75	x	x	18.56	18.80	18.55	18.80	
5	Grit Hammer	Germany	18.32	18.07	18.37	18.58	x	18.30	18.58	
6	Krystyna Danilczyk	Poland	18.13	18.55	x	17.80	18.57	x	18.57	
7	Mihaela Oana	Romania	18.31	18.08	x	18.14	x	x	18.31	
8	Ines Wittich	Germany	17.89	17.58	x	x	x	x	17.89	
9	Danguolé Urbikiené	Lithuania	17.34	x	17.63				17.63	
10	Agnese Maffeis	Italy	15.89	x	16.38				16.38	
11	Annick Lefebvre	France	15.34	14.83	15.62				15.62	
12	Greet Meulemeester	Belgium	15.29	15.54	x				15.54	
	Valentina Fedyushina	Ukraine	x	x	x				NM	
