= 1996 European Athletics Indoor Championships – Women's shot put =

The women's shot put event at the 1996 European Athletics Indoor Championships was held in Stockholm Globe Arena on 9 March.

== Results ==
| Rank | Name | Nationality | #1 | #2 | #3 | #4 | #5 | #6 | Result | Notes |
|---|---|---|---|---|---|---|---|---|---|---|
| 1st place, gold medalist(s) | Astrid Kumbernuß | Germany | x | 19.08 | 19.35 | 19.70 | 19.79 | x | 19.79 | |
| 2nd place, silver medalist(s) | Irina Khudoroshkina | Russia | 17.71 | 17.99 | 18.69 | x | 18.22 | 19.07 | 19.07 | |
| 3rd place, bronze medalist(s) | Valentina Fedyushina | Ukraine | 18.42 | 18.52 | 18.32 | x | 18.45 | 18.90 | 18.90 | |
| 4 | Judy Oakes | Great Britain | 17.80 | 18.42 | 18.18 | 17.94 | 18.72 | 18.39 | 18.72 | |
| 5 | Nadine Kleinert | Germany | 17.91 | 17.61 | 17.88 | 18.10 | x | 17.96 | 18.10 | |
| 6 | Martina de la Puente | Spain | 17.04 | 16.41 | 16.70 | x | 16.86 | 16.76 | 17.04 | |
| 7 | Nataša Erjavec | Slovenia | x | 16.53 | 16.76 | 16.16 | 16.96 | 16.45 | 16.96 | |
| 8 | Margarita Ramos | Spain | 16.46 | 16.53 | 16.26 | x | 16.52 | x | 16.53 | |
| 9 | Laurence Manfredi | France | 15.64 | 15.86 | 16.22 | | | | 16.22 | |
| 10 | Mara Rosolen | Italy | x | x | 16.12 | | | | 16.12 | |
