= Kalliopi Ouzouni =

Greek shot putter

Personal information
- Born: February 8, 1973 (age 53) Thessaloniki, Greece

Sport
- Sport: Track and field

Kalliopi Ouzouni (Greek: Καλλιόπη Ουζούνη, born February 8, 1973) is a retired female shot putter from Greece. Her personal best throw is 18.90 metres, achieved in May 2004 in Kalamata. This places her second on the Greek all-time list, behind Irini Terzoglou. She holds the indoor national record with 19.03 m, achieved in January 2000 in Piraeus.

She finished seventh at the 2000 Olympic Games and twelfth at the 2002 European Championships. She also competed at the 1999 and 2001 World Championships as well as the 2004 Olympic Games without reaching the finals. She won the women's event with 18.63m, which earned her a spot on the European Cup team.

== Competition record ==
Year	Competition	Venue	Position	Notes
Representing Greece
1995	Universiade	Fukuoka, Japan	12th (q)	15.17 m^{1}
1997	World Indoor Championships	Paris, France	16th (q)	16.59 m
1997	World Championships	Athens, Greece	—	NM
1998	European Indoor Championships	Valencia, Spain	10th	17.47 m
1999	World Championships	Seville, Spain	16th (q)	17.79 m
2000	European Indoor Championships	Ghent, Belgium	12th (q)	17.39 m
2000	Olympic Games	Sydney, Australia	7th	18.63 m
2001	World Championships	Edmonton, Canada	16th (q)	16.82 m
2002	European Championships	Munich, Germany	12th	17.38 m
2004	Olympic Games	Athens, Greece	12th	18.03 m

^{1}No mark in the final
