= List of Balkan Athletics Indoor Championships winners =

The Balkan Athletics Indoor Championships, also known as the Balkan Indoor Games (Greek: Βαλκανικοί Αγώνες Κλειστού Στίβου), is an annual international indoor track and field competition between athletes from the Balkan Peninsula. Following a test event in 1991, it was officially launched in 1994. Organised by the Association of the Balkan Athletics Federations (ABAF), it is typically held in February.

Guest competitors from outside of the Balkan Athletics grouping have competed at the competition, but are not considered as formal winners or champions at the competition.

== Men ==
=== 60 metres ===
- 1991: Daniel Cojocaru (ROM)
- 1994: Alexandros Terzian (GRE)
- 1995: Alexandros Yenovelis (GRE)
- 1996: Haralabos Papadias (GRE)
- 1997: Angelos Pavlakakis (GRE)
- 1998: Gabriel Burtea (ROM)
- 1999: Konstantinos Vogiatzakis (GRE)
- 2000: Angelos Pavlakakis (GRE)
- 2001: Angelos Pavlakakis (GRE)
- 2002: Michalis Perakis (GRE)
- 2003: Hristoforos Hoidis (GRE)
- 2004: Aristidis Petridis (GRE)
- 2005: Aristidis Petridis (GRE)
- 2006: Aristidis Petridis (GRE)

=== 200 metres ===
- 1991: Daniel Cojocaru (ROM)
- 1994: Ioannis Nafpliotis (GRE)
- 1995: Daniel Cojocaru (ROM)
- 1996: Alexios Alexopoulos (GRE)
- 1997: Georgios Panagiotopoulos (GRE)
- 1998: Resat Oguz (TUR)
- 1999: Resat Oguz (TUR)
- 2000: Iliya Dzhivondov (BUL)
- 2001: Panagiotis Sarris (GRE)
- 2002: Anastasios Goussis (GRE)
- 2003: Stelios Demotsios (GRE)
- 2004: Ioan Vieru (ROM)
- 2005: Adrian Stefan (ROM)

=== 400 metres ===
- 1991: Nenad Đurović (YUG)
- 1994: Andreas Linardatos (GRE)
- 1995: Dimitrios Yepos (GRE)
- 1996: Konstantinos Kenteris (GRE)
- 1997: Slobodan Branković (YUG)
- 1998: Siniša Peša (YUG)
- 1999: Konstantinos Kenteris (GRE)
- 2000: Iliya Dzhivondov (BUL)
- 2001: Stelios Demotsios (GRE)
- 2002: Ioan Vieru (ROM)
- 2003: Ioan Vieru (ROM)
- 2004: Georgios Oikonomidis (GRE)
- 2005: Stelios Demotsios (GRE)
- 2006: Florin Suciu (ROM)

=== 800 metres ===
- 1991: Nelian Ianchis (ROM)
- 1994: Ion Bogde (ROM)
- 1995: Dian Petkov (BUL)
- 1996: Dian Petkov (BUL)
- 1997: Panagiotis Stroubakos (GRE)
- 1998: Alexandru Vasile (ROM)
- 1999: Daniel Oniciuc (ROM)
- 2000: Daniel Oniciuc (ROM)
- 2001: Daniel Oniciuc (ROM)
- 2002: Stelian Tufaru (ROM)
- 2003: Ioan Zaizan (ROM)
- 2004: Ferencz Rigo (ROM)
- 2005: Ioan Zaizan (ROM)
- 2006: Ioan Zaizan (ROM)

=== 1500 metres ===
- 1991: Spyros Christopoulos (GRE)
- 1994: Ion Avramescu (ROM)
- 1995: Ion Avramescu (ROM)
- 1996: Cristian Orza (ROM)
- 1997: Alexandru Vasile (ROM)
- 1998: Ovidiu Olteanu (ROM)
- 1999: Panagiotis Papoulias (GRE)
- 2000: Đorđe Milić (YUG)
- 2001: Darko Radomirović (YUG)
- 2002: Darko Radomirović (YUG)
- 2003: Kostas Karakatsanis (GRE)
- 2004: Ioan Zaizan (ROM)
- 2005: Halil Akkaş (TUR)
- 2006: Halil Akkaş (TUR)

=== 3000 metres ===
- 1991: Nikos Vouzis (GRE)
- 1994: Ovidiu Olteanu (ROM)
- 1995: Ovidiu Olteanu (ROM)
- 1996: Ovidiu Olteanu (ROM)
- 1997: Ovidiu Olteanu (ROM)
- 1998: Panayotis Charamis (GRE)
- 1999: Metin Sazak (TUR)
- 2000: Adrian Maghiar (ROM)
- 2001: Iaroslav Mușinschi (MDA)
- 2002: Ovidiu Olteanu (ROM)
- 2003: Michalis Gelassakis (GRE)
- 2004: Iaroslav Mușinschi (MDA)
- 2005: Adrian Maghiar (ROM)
- 2006: Marius Ionescu (ROM)

=== 60 metres hurdles ===
- 1991: Gheorghe Boroi (ROM)
- 1994: Gheorghe Boroi (ROM)
- 1995: Stamatis Magos (GRE)
- 1996: Stelios Bisbas (GRE)
- 1997: Mircea Oaidă (ROM)
- 1998: Florin Stefan (ROM)
- 1999: Zhivko Videnov (BUL)
- 2000: Zhivko Videnov (BUL)
- 2001: Stamatis Magos (GRE)
- 2002: Zhivko Videnov (BUL)
- 2003: Miroslav Novaković (SCG)
- 2004: Zhivko Videnov (BUL)
- 2005: Alexandru Mihailescu (ROM)
- 2006: Alexandru Mihailescu (ROM)

=== High jump ===
- 1991: Eugen-Cristian Popescu (ROM)
- 1994: Eugen-Cristian Popescu (ROM)
- 1995: Labros Papakostas (GRE)
- 1996: Dragutin Topić (YUG)
- 1997: Konstantinos Liapis (GRE)
- 1998: Eugen-Cristian Popescu (ROM)
- 1999: Elvir Krehmić (BIH)
- 2000: Elvir Krehmić (BIH)
- 2001: Ștefan Vasilache (ROM)
- 2002: Ștefan Vasilache (ROM)
- 2003: Dragutin Topić (SCG)
- 2004: Ștefan Vasilache (ROM)
- 2005: Dragutin Topić (SCG)
- 2006: Ștefan Vasilache (ROM)

=== Pole vault ===
- 1991: Razvan Enescu (ROM)
- 1994: Delko Lesev (BUL)
- 1995: Konstantinos Tsatalos (GRE)
- 1996: Konstantinos Tsatalos (GRE)
- 1997: Christos Pallakis (GRE)
- 1998: Ruhan Işım (TUR)
- 1999: Iliyan Efremov (BUL)
- 2000: Iliyan Efremov (BUL)
- 2001: Iliyan Efremov (BUL)
- 2002: Philippos Sgouros (GRE)
- 2003: Spas Bukhalov (BUL)
- 2004: Konstantinos Filippidis (GRE)
- 2005: Konstantinos Filippidis (GRE)
- 2006: Spas Bukhalov (BUL)

=== Long jump ===
- 1991: Konstandinos Koukodimos (GRE)
- 1994: Bogdan Tudor (ROM)
- 1995: Bogdan Tudor (ROM)
- 1996: Bogdan Țăruș (ROM)
- 1997: Spyridon Vasdekis (GRE)
- 1998: Danial Jahić (YUG)
- 1999: Danial Jahić (YUG)
- 2000: Petar Dachev (BUL)
- 2001: Petar Dachev (BUL)
- 2002: Petar Dachev (BUL)
- 2003: Bogdan Țăruș (ROM)
- 2004: Nikolay Atanasov (BUL)
- 2005: Marko Milinkov (SCG)
- 2006: Nikolay Atanasov (BUL)

=== Triple jump ===
- 1991: Theodoros Tantanozis (GRE)
- 1994: Ionel Eftemie (ROM)
- 1995: Stoyko Tsonev (BUL)
- 1996: Yaroslav Ivanov (BUL)
- 1997: Ionel Eftemie (ROM)
- 1998: Georgios Staikos (GRE)
- 1999: Rostislav Dimitrov (BUL)
- 2000: Vasil Gergov (BUL)
- 2001: Nikolay Raev (BUL)
- 2002: Marian Oprea (ROM)
- 2003: Marian Oprea (ROM)
- 2004: Daniel Donovici (ROM)
- 2005: Dimitrios Tsiamis (GRE)
- 2006: Marian Oprea (ROM)

=== Shot put ===
- 1991: Gheorghe Gușet (ROM)
- 1994: Gheorghe Gușet (ROM)
- 1995: Alexios Leonidis (GRE)
- 1996: Vladimir Vićentijević (YUG)
- 1997: Alexios Leonidis (GRE)
- 1998: Dragan Perić (YUG)
- 1999: Gheorghe Gușet (ROM)
- 2000: Gheorghe Gușet (ROM)
- 2001: Gheorghe Gușet (ROM)
- 2002: Gheorghe Gușet (ROM)
- 2003: Dragan Perić (SCG)
- 2004: Gheorghe Gușet (ROM)
- 2005: Gheorghe Gușet (ROM)
- 2006: Gheorghe Gușet (ROM)

=== 5000 metres walk ===
- 1994: Costică Bălan (ROM)

== Women ==
=== 60 metres ===
- 1991: Mirela Dulgheru (ROM)
- 1994: Desislava Dimitrova (BUL)
- 1995: Ekaterini Koffa (GRE)
- 1996: Maria Tsoni (GRE)
- 1997: Maria Tsoni (GRE)
- 1998: Panayota Koutrouli (GRE)
- 1999: Ekaterini Thanou (GRE)
- 2000: Nora Ivanova (TUR)
- 2001: Vukosava Đapić (YUG)
- 2002: Magdalene Pantaleon (GRE)
- 2003: Georgia Kokloni (GRE)
- 2004: Georgia Kokloni (GRE)
- 2005: Maria Karastamati (GRE)
- 2006: Tezdzhan Naimova (BUL)

=== 200 metres ===
- 1991: Daniela Plescan (ROM)
- 1994: Ionela Târlea (ROM)
- 1995: Ekaterini Koffa (GRE)
- 1996: Ekaterini Koffa (GRE)
- 1997: Ekaterini Koffa (GRE)
- 1998: Aksel Gürcan Demirtaş (TUR)
- 1999: Monika Gachevska (BUL)
- 2000: Nora Ivanova (TUR)
- 2001: Ionela Târlea (ROM)
- 2002: Marina Vasarmidou (GRE)
- 2003: Ionela Târlea (ROM)
- 2004: Angela Moroșanu (ROM)
- 2005: Angela Moroșanu (ROM)

=== 400 metres ===
- 1991: Milena Saracheva (BUL)
- 1994: Magdalena Nedelcu (ROM)
- 1995: Magdalena Nedelcu (ROM)
- 1996: Öznar Dursun (TUR)
- 1997: Ionela Târlea (ROM)
- 1998: Christina Panagou (GRE)
- 1999: Alina Rîpanu (ROM)
- 2000: Chrysoula Goudenoudi (GRE)
- 2001: Chrysoula Goudenoudi (GRE)
- 2002: Monica Bumbescu (ROM)
- 2003: Chrysoula Goudenoudi (GRE)
- 2004: Mariyana Dimitrova (BUL)
- 2005: Mariyana Dimitrova (BUL)
- 2006: Vania Stambolova (BUL)

=== 800 metres ===
- 1991: Mitica Constantin (ROM)
- 1994: Ella Kovacs (ROM)
- 1995: Laura Itcou (ROM)
- 1996: Carmen Stanciu (ROM)
- 1997: Laura Itcou (ROM)
- 1998: Carmen Stanciu (ROM)
- 1999: Anca Safta (ROM)
- 2000: Maria Cioncan (ROM)
- 2001: Tsvetelina Kirilova (BUL)
- 2002: Maria Papadopoulou (GRE)
- 2003: Tsvetelina Kirilova (BUL)
- 2004: Eleni Filandra (GRE)
- 2005: Corina Dumbrăvean (ROM)
- 2006: Mihaela Neacșu (ROM)

=== 1500 metres ===
- 1991: Tudorița Chidu (ROM)
- 1994: Tudorița Chidu (ROM)
- 1995: Karolina Skourti (GRE)
- 1996: Cătălina Gheorghiu (ROM)
- 1997: Cătălina Gheorghiu (ROM)
- 1998: Luminiţa Gogîrlea (ROM)
- 1999: Iana Davidova (MDA)
- 2000: Elena Antoci (ROM)
- 2001: Elena Antoci (ROM)
- 2002: Elena Antoci (ROM)
- 2003: Elena Antoci (ROM)
- 2004: Mihaela Olaru (ROM)
- 2005: Elena Antoci (ROM)
- 2006: Daniela Yordanova (BUL)

=== 3000 metres ===
- 1991: Mirsada Burić (YUG)
- 1994: Norica Câmpean (ROM)
- 1995: Luminiţa Gogîrlea (ROM)
- 1996: Luminiţa Gogîrlea (ROM)
- 1997: Luminiţa Gogîrlea (ROM)
- 1998: Lale Öztürk (TUR)
- 1999: Maria Cristina Grosu-Mazilu (ROM)
- 2000: Tezeta Sürekli (TUR)
- 2001: Maria Cristina Grosu-Mazilu (ROM)
- 2002: Maria Cristina Grosu-Mazilu (ROM)
- 2003: Maria Cristina Grosu-Mazilu (ROM)
- 2004: Alina Cucerzan (ROM)
- 2005: Maria Cristina Grosu-Mazilu (ROM)
- 2006: Cristina Casandra (ROM)

=== 60 metres hurdles ===
- 1991: Liliana Năstase (ROM)
- 1994: Svetla Damova (BUL)
- 1995: Erica Niculae (ROM)
- 1996: Liliana Năstase (ROM)
- 1997: Svetla Dimitrova (BUL)
- 1998: Hristiana Tabaki (GRE)
- 1999: Svetla Dimitrova (BUL)
- 2000: Hristiana Tabaki (GRE)
- 2001: Svetla Dimitrova (BUL)
- 2002: Evi Nesoudi (GRE)
- 2003: Flora Redoumi (GRE)
- 2004: Carmen Zamfir-Ghilesi (ROM)
- 2005: Esen Kızıldağ (TUR)
- 2006: Alexandra Komnou (GRE)

=== High jump ===
- 1991: Tereza Marinova (BUL)
- 1994: Stefka Kostadinova (BUL)
- 1995: Monica Iagăr (ROM)
- 1996: Monica Iagăr (ROM)
- 1997: Monica Iagăr (ROM)
- 1998: Monica Iagăr (ROM)
- 1999: Olga Bolșova (MDA)
- 2000: Venelina Veneva-Mateeva (BUL)
- 2001: Inna Gliznuta (MDA)
- 2002: Candeğer Kılınçer Oğuz (TUR)
- 2003: Inna Gliznuta (MDA)
- 2004: Monica Iagăr (ROM)
- 2005: Deniz Öz (TUR)
- 2006: Venelina Veneva-Mateeva (BUL)

=== Pole vault ===
- 1998: Gabriela Mihalcea (ROM)
- 1999: Gabriela Mihalcea (ROM)
- 2000: Tanya Stefanova (BUL)
- 2001: Georgia Tsilligiri (GRE)
- 2002: Georgia Tsilligiri (GRE)
- 2003: Tanya Stefanova (BUL)
- 2004: Georgia Tsilligiri (GRE)
- 2005: Tanya Stefanova (BUL)
- 2006: Afroditi Skafida (GRE)

=== Long jump ===
- 1991: Mirela Dulgheru (ROM)
- 1994: Mirela Dulgheru (ROM)
- 1995: Niki Xanthou (GRE)
- 1996: Niki Xanthou (GRE)
- 1997: Niki Xanthou (GRE)
- 1998: Monica Toth (ROM)
- 1999: Niki Xanthou (GRE)
- 2000: Despina Papavassilaki (GRE)
- 2001: Stiliani Pilatou (GRE)
- 2002: Viorica Țigău (ROM)
- 2003: Stiliani Pilatou (GRE)
- 2004: Stiliani Pilatou (GRE)
- 2005: Stiliani Pilatou (GRE)
- 2006: Stiliani Pilatou (GRE)

=== Triple jump ===
- 1994: Monica Toth (ROM)
- 1995: Tereza Marinova (BUL)
- 1996: Monica Toth (ROM)
- 1997: Cristina Nicolau (ROM)
- 1998: Cristina Nicolau (ROM)
- 1999: Tereza Marinova (BUL)
- 2000: Cristina Nicolau (ROM)
- 2001: Tereza Marinova (BUL)
- 2002: Marija Šestak (YUG)
- 2003: Hrysopiyi Devetzi (GRE)
- 2004: Adelina Gavrilă (ROM)
- 2005: Adelina Gavrilă (ROM)
- 2006: Tereza Marinova (BUL)

=== Shot put ===
- 1991: Mihaela Oana (ROM)
- 1994: Lucica Ciobanu (ROM)
- 1995: Livia Mehes (ROM)
- 1996: Livia Mehes (ROM)
- 1997: Livia Mehes (ROM)
- 1998: Mihaela Oana (ROM)
- 1999: Elena Hila (ROM)
- 2000: Livia Mehes (ROM)
- 2001: Irini Terzoglou (GRE)
- 2002: Elena Hila (ROM)
- 2003: Irini Terzoglou (GRE)
- 2004: Irini Terzoglou (GRE)
- 2005: Radoslava Mavrodieva (BUL)
- 2006: Elena Hila (ROM)

=== 3000 metres walk ===
- 1994: Norica Câmpean (ROM)
