= Svetlana Krivelyova =

Russian shot putter (born 1969)

Personal information
- Born: 13 June 1969 (age 57) Bryansk, Soviet Union

Sport
- Sport: Track and field
Medal record
Representing Unified Team
Olympic Games
| Gold medal – first place | 1992 Barcelona | Shot put |
Summer Universiade
| Silver medal – second place | 1991 Sheffield | Shot put |
Representing Russia
Olympic Games
| Disqualified | 2004 Athens | Shot put |
World Championships
| Gold medal – first place | 2003 Paris | Shot put |
| Silver medal – second place | 1993 Stuttgart | Shot put |
| Bronze medal – third place | 1991 Tokyo | Shot put |
| Bronze medal – third place | 1999 Seville | Shot put |

Svetlana Vladimirovna Krivelyova (Russian: Светлана Владимировна Кривелёва; born 13 June 1969) is a former Russian track and field athlete who specialised in the shot put.

Krivelyova was born in Bryansk, Russia. Her career highlights were the Summer Olympics gold medal in 1992 whilst representing the Unified Team, where she beat the reigning world champion Huang Zhihong of China, and her World Championship victory in 2003.

Her most unlikely victory came at the 2004 World Indoor Championships. She was awarded the gold medal after Ukraine's Vita Pavlysh (Krivelyova's former Unified Team teammate) was stripped of her title for failing a drug test. This was the second time Pavlysh was found to have taken anabolic steroids and lost a World indoor title; she was subsequently banned from athletics for life.

Despite being world ranked number 1 in the run up to the 2004 Summer Olympics in Athens, Greece, Krivelyova could only manage to finish fourth to match her finish at the 2000 Summer Olympics. However the winner, compatriot Irina Korzhanenko, tested positive for Stanozolol and was stripped of her title, promoting Krivelyova to the bronze medal position.

The IOC retested the samples from the 2004 Olympics and diagnosed a positive test. Krivelyova lost her third place to Nadzeya Ostapchuk (the bronze medal was not awarded). In April 2013, she was banned from competitions for two years.

== International competitions ==
| Year | Competition | Venue | Position | Event | Result | Notes |
|---|---|---|---|---|---|---|
| 1986 | World Junior Championships | Athens, Greece | 6th | Shot put | 16.41 m | |
| 1987 | European Junior Championships | Birmingham, United Kingdom | 3rd | Shot put | 16.64 m | |
| 1988 | World Junior Championships | Sudbury, Canada | 4th | Shot put | 16.91 m | |
| 1991 | World Indoor Championships | Seville, Spain | 8th | Shot put | 18.58 m | |
| 1991 | Universiade | Sheffield, United Kingdom | 2nd | Shot put | 19.62 m | |
| 1991 | World Championships | Tokyo, Japan | 3rd | Shot put | 20.16 m | |
| 1992 | Olympic Games | Barcelona, Spain | 1st | Shot put | 21.06 m | |
| 1993 | World Indoor Championships | Toronto, Canada | 1st | Shot put | 19.57 m | |
| 1993 | World Championships | Stuttgart, Germany | 2nd | Shot put | 19.97 m | |
| 1996 | European Cup | Madrid, Spain | 3rd | Shot put | 17.70 m | |
| 1996 | Olympic Games | Atlanta, United States | 15th (q) | Shot put | 18.23 m | |
| 1997 | World Indoor Championships | Paris, France | — | Shot put | DNS | |
| 1997 | World Championships | Athens, Greece | 10th | Shot put | 17.38 m | |
| 1998 | European Championships | Budapest, Hungary | 4th | Shot put | 19.08 m | |
| 1999 | World Indoor Championships | Maebashi, Japan | 1st | Shot put | 19.08 m | |
| 1999 | European Cup | Paris, France | 3rd | Shot put | 18.36 m | |
| 1999 | World Championships | Seville, Spain | 3rd | Shot put | 19.43 m | |
| 2000 | European Indoor Championships | Ghent, Belgium | 4th | Shot put | 18.96 m | |
| 2000 | Olympic Games | Sydney, Australia | 4th | Shot put | 19.37 m | |
| 2001 | World Indoor Championships | Lisbon, Portugal | 3rd | Shot put | 19.18 m | |
| 2001 | World Championships | Edmonton, Canada | 9th | Shot put | 18.70 m | |
| 2001 | Goodwill Games | Brisbane, Australia | 6th | Shot put | 17.73 m | |
| 2002 | European Cup | Annecy, France | 1st | Shot put | 19.63 m | |
| 2002 | European Championships | Munich, Germany | 3rd | Shot put | 19.56 m | |
| 2003 | World Indoor Championships | Birmingham, United Kingdom | 5th | Shot put | 19.57 m | |
| 2003 | European Cup | Florence, Italy | 2nd | Shot put | 18.98 m | |
| 2003 | World Championships | Paris, France | 1st | Shot put | 20.63 m | |
| 2004 | World Indoor Championships | Budapest, Hungary | 1st | Shot put | 19.90 m | |
| 2004 | Olympic Games | Olympia, Greece | DQ ~~4th~~ | Shot put | ~~19.49 m~~ | Doping |
| 2005 | World Championships | Helsinki, Finland | DQ ~~4th~~ | Shot put | ~~19.16 m~~ | Doping |

== National titles ==
- Russian Athletics Championships
  - Shot put: 1992, 1998, 1999, 2000, 2002, 2003
- Russian Indoor Athletics Championships
  - Shot put: 1993, 2003
- Soviet Athletics Championships
  - Shot put: 1991
- Soviet Indoor Athletics Championships
  - Shot put: 1991

== See also ==
- List of doping cases in athletics
- List of Olympic medalists in athletics (women)
- List of 1992 Summer Olympics medal winners
- List of 2004 Summer Olympics medal winners
- List of stripped Olympic medals
- List of World Athletics Championships medalists (women)
- List of IAAF World Indoor Championships medalists (women)
- List of European Athletics Championships medalists (women)
- List of Russian sportspeople
- List of Russian people
- Doping in Russia
- Doping at the World Athletics Championships
- Doping at the Olympic Games
- Russia at the World Athletics Championships
