= Athletics at the 1991 Pan American Games – Women's shot put =

Women's shot put at the Pan American Games

The women's shot put event at the 1991 Pan American Games was held in Havana, Cuba on 4 August.

== Results ==
Rank	Name	Nationality	#1	#2	#3	#4	#5	#6	Result	Notes
1st place, gold medalist(s)	Belsis Laza	Cuba	18.40	18.87	x	18.51	x	x	18.87	
2nd place, silver medalist(s)	Connie Price-Smith	United States	18.16	18.00	18.30	17.57	x	x	18.30	
3rd place, bronze medalist(s)	Ramona Pagel	United States	17.45	17.28	16.88	17.72	17.76	x	17.76	
4	Lisette Martínez	Cuba	16.52	x	16.89	17.18	17.21	x	17.21	
5	Elisângela Adriano	Brazil	x	15.42	x	x	15.77	x	15.77	
6	María Urrutia	Colombia	14.49	14.95	14.79	15.41	x	14.82	15.41	
7	Georgette Reed	Canada	x	14.48	14.45	x	14.67	13.83	14.67	
8	Hughette Robertson	Guyana	12.04	11.47	11.03	11.46	11.64	11.90	12.04	
