= 1995 World Championships in Athletics – Women's shot put =

These are the official results of the Women's Shot Put event at the 1995 IAAF World Championships in Gothenburg, Sweden. There were a total number of 26 participating athletes, with the final held on Saturday August 5, 1995.

== Medalists ==
Gold	Astrid Kumbernuss; Germany (GER)
Silver	Huang Zhihong; PR China (CHN)
Bronze	Svetla Mitkova; Bulgaria (BUL)

== Schedule ==
- All times are Central European Time (UTC+1)

Qualification Round
Group A	Group B
05.08.1995 – 09:40h	05.08.1995 – 09:40h
Final Round
05.08.1995 – 17:25h

== Abbreviations ==
- All results shown are in metres

Q	automatic qualification
q	qualification by rank
DNS	did not start
NM	no mark
WR	world record
AR	area record
NR	national record
PB	personal best
SB	season best

== Records ==
Standing records prior to the 1995 World Athletics Championships
World Record	Natalya Lisovskaya (URS)	22.63 m	June 7, 1987	Moscow, Soviet Union
Event Record	Natalya Lisovskaya (URS)	21.24 m	September 5, 1987	Rome, Italy

== Qualification ==
Qualifying distance: 18.80 metres.

=== Group A ===
Rank	Overall	Athlete	Attempts			Distance	Note
Rank	Overall	Athlete	1	2	3	Distance	Note
1	1	Astrid Kumbernuss (GER)	19.83	—	—	19.83 m	
2	5	Zhang Liuhong (CHN)	18.24	18.60	18.25	18.60 m	
3	8	Irina Korzhanenko (RUS)	18.32	18.40	X	18.40 m	
4	10	Stephanie Storp (GER)	17.88	18.36	18.23	18.36 m	
5	11	Vita Pavlysh (UKR)	17.79	17.21	18.15	18.15 m	
6	12	Connie Price-Smith (USA)	17.48	17.90	18.05	18.05 m	
7	13	Judy Oakes (GBR)	17.67	17.87	X	17.87 m	
8	16	Mara Rosolen (ITA)	16.90	X	X	16.90 m	
9	17	Danguolė Bimbaitė-Urbikienė (LTU)	15.84	X	16.33	16.33 m	
10	19	Eileen Vanisi (USA)	16.11	15.82	15.32	16.11 m	
11	22	Lisa Misipeka (ASA)	13.98	13.66	13.71	13.98 m	
12	24	Mary Curry (SAM)	8.85	—	—	8.85 m	
—	—	Oumou Traoré (MLI)	—	—	—	DNS	

=== Group B ===
Rank	Overall	Athlete	Attempts			Distance	Note
Rank	Overall	Athlete	1	2	3	Distance	Note
1	2	Kathrin Neimke (GER)	19.07	—	—	19.07 m	
2	3	Huang Zhihong (CHN)	19.01	—	—	19.01 m	
3	4	Sui Xinmei (CHN)	18.28	18.15	18.75	18.75 m	
4	6	Ramona Pagel (USA)	X	18.57	18.32	18.57 m	
5	7	Svetla Mitkova (BUL)	17.91	18.30	18.48	18.48 m	
6	8	Valentina Fedyushina (UKR)	17.14	18.40	X	18.40 m	
7	14	Corrie de Bruin (NED)	16.77	16.56	17.01	17.01 m	
8	15	Nataša Erjavec (SLO)	16.91	16.53	16.58	16.91 m	
9	18	Danijela Curović (YUG)	16.13	16.30	15.59	16.30 m	
10	20	Yumileidi Cumbá (CUB)	X	15.80	X	15.80 m	
11	21	Hanane Ahmed Khaled (EGY)	14.56	X	14.50	14.56 m	
12	23	Seng Tea Ai (BRU)	X	12.34	12.46	12.46 m	
13	25	Nabeela Mabrouk (PLE)	X	5.71	X	5.71 m	

== Final ==
Rank	Athlete	Attempts						Distance	Note
Rank	Athlete	1	2	3	4	5	6	Distance	Note
1st place, gold medalist(s)	Astrid Kumbernuss (GER)	20.52	20.59	21.22	20.09	X	20.23	21.22 m	
2nd place, silver medalist(s)	Huang Zhihong (CHN)	19.92	20.04	X	X	X	—	20.04 m	
3rd place, bronze medalist(s)	Svetla Mitkova (BUL)	18.70	18.32	19.04	18.93	18.99	19.56	19.56 m	
4	Kathrin Neimke (GER)	18.37	19.30	18.72	19.11	19.15	X	19.30 m	
5	Sui Xinmei (CHN)	18.90	X	X	18.42	18.60	19.09	19.09 m	
6	Zhang Liuhong (CHN)	17.94	18.47	19.07	18.23	18.60	18.47	19.07 m	
7	Ramona Pagel (USA)	X	18.39	18.81	18.11	X	17.78	18.81 m	
8	Stephanie Storp (GER)	18.22	18.01	18.81	X	X	—	18.81 m	
9	Connie Price-Smith (USA)	18.72	18.66	X				18.72 m	
10	Valentina Fedyushina (UKR)	18.03	X	X				18.03 m	
11	Vita Pavlysh (UKR)	17.97	X	X				17.97 m	
12	Irina Korzhanenko (RUS)	X	X	17.88				17.88 m	

== See also ==
- 1995 Shot Put Year Ranking
- 1996 Women's Olympic Shot Put
