= Athletics at the 1989 Summer Universiade – Women's shot put =

The women's shot put event at the 1989 Summer Universiade was held at the Wedaustadion in Duisburg with the final on 25 August 1989.

== Results ==
Rank	Athlete	Nationality	Result	Notes
1st place, gold medalist(s)	Huang Zhihong	China	20.56	
2nd place, silver medalist(s)	Belsy Laza	Cuba	19.32	
3rd place, bronze medalist(s)	Zhou Tianhua	China	18.71	
4	Larisa Peleshenko	Soviet Union	18.66	
5	Katja Weiser	West Germany	17.33	
6	Tatyana Khorkhulyova	Soviet Union	16.33	
7	Małgorzata Wolska	Poland	16.21	
8	Maria Tranchina	Italy	16.06	
9	Margarita Ramos	Spain	15.59	
10	Carla Garrett	United States	15.52	
11	Eleni Tsentemeidou	Greece	15.35	
12	Shannon Kekula	Canada	14.59	
13	Pamela Dukes	United States	14.25	
14	Anne Otutu	Nigeria	12.81	
