= Zhang Liuhong =

Chinese shot putter

Medal record

Women's athletics

Representing China

Asian Championships
Gold medal – first place	1993 Manila	Shot put

Zhang Liuhong (born 16 January 1969) is a retired Chinese shot putter, best known for her bronze medal at the 1993 World Indoor Championships. Her personal best was 20.54 metres, achieved in June 1994 in Beijing.

== Achievements ==
Year	Competition	Venue	Position	Notes
Representing China
1988	World Junior Championships	Sudbury, Canada	8th	15.43 m
1993	World Indoor Championships	Toronto, Canada	3rd	19.32 m
1993	East Asian Games	Shanghai, China	1st	19.88 m
1993	Asian Championships	Manila, Philippines	1st	18.68 m
1994	Asian Games	Hiroshima, Japan	2nd	19.25 m
1995	World Indoor Championships	Barcelona, Spain	4th	18.84 m
1995	World Championships	Gothenburg, Sweden	6th	19.07 m
1997	World Indoor Championships	Paris, France	8th	18.29 m
1997	World Championships	Athens, Greece	15th (q)	17.82 m
