= 1986 World Junior Championships in Athletics – Women's shot put =

The women's shot put event at the 1986 World Junior Championships in Athletics was held in Athens, Greece, at Olympic Stadium on 16 and 17 July.

== Medalists ==
Gold	Heike Rohrmann; East Germany
Silver	Stephanie Storp; West Germany
Bronze	Ines Wittich; East Germany

== Results ==
=== Final ===
17 July

Rank	Name	Nationality	Result	Notes
1st place, gold medalist(s)	Heike Rohrmann	East Germany	18.39	
2nd place, silver medalist(s)	Stephanie Storp	West Germany	18.20	
3rd place, bronze medalist(s)	Ines Wittich	East Germany	18.19	
4	Anna Romanova	Soviet Union	17.42	
5	Snezhana Pikhmanova	Bulgaria	16.90	
6	Svetlana Krivelyova	Soviet Union	16.41	
7	Jana Capatina	Romania	15.62	
8	Agnes Deselaers	West Germany	15.16	
9	Yvette Ykema	Australia	14.17	
10	Eléni Tsentemeidou	Greece	13.54	
11	Brandi Gail	United States	13.54	
12	Bernadette Serone	Australia	13.54	

=== Qualifications ===
16 Jul

==== Group A ====
Rank	Name	Nationality	Result	Notes
1	Stephanie Storp	West Germany	18.03	Q
2	Heike Rohrmann	East Germany	17.68	Q
3	Ines Wittich	East Germany	17.48	Q
4	Anna Romanova	Soviet Union	15.93	Q
5	Svetlana Krivelyova	Soviet Union	15.47	Q
6	Jana Capatina	Romania	15.09	Q
7	Snezhana Pikhmanova	Bulgaria	14.88	Q
8	Bernadette Serone	Australia	14.43	Q
9	Agnes Deselaers	West Germany	14.41	Q
10	Eléni Tsentemeidou	Greece	14.33	Q
11	Yvette Ykema	Australia	13.81	q
12	Brandi Gail	United States	13.65	q
13	Nathalie Dumont	Canada	12.25	
14	Amy Werkowski	United States	12.17	
15	Suzanne Dandenault	Canada	11.74	
16	Hanane Khaled	Egypt	11.07	

== Participation ==
According to an unofficial count, 16 athletes from 10 countries participated in the event.

- Australia (2)
- Bulgaria (1)
- Canada (2)
- East Germany (2)
- Egypt (1)
- Greece (1)
- Romania (1)
- Soviet Union (2)
- United States (2)
- West Germany (2)
