= Athletics at the 1993 Summer Universiade – Women's shot put =

The women's shot put event at the 1993 Summer Universiade was held at the UB Stadium in Buffalo, United States on July 15, 1993.

== Results ==
Rank	Athlete	Nationality	Result	Notes
1st place, gold medalist(s)	Zhou Tianhua	China	19.17	
2nd place, silver medalist(s)	Belsy Laza	Cuba	18.48	
3rd place, bronze medalist(s)	Katrin Koch	Germany	16.70	
4	Deborah Dunant	Netherlands	16.61	
5	Agnes Deselaers	Germany	16.45	
6	Stevanie Wadsworth	United States	16.42	
7	Mara Rosolen	Italy	16.04	
8	Maria Tranchina	Italy	15.98	
9	Sharon Andrews	Great Britain	15.48	
10	Melissa Weis	United States	15.24	
11	Alice Matějková	Czech Republic	14.61	
12	María Ordoñez	Ecuador	10.46	
