= Heike Rohrmann =

East German shot putter

Heike Rohrmann (born 22 February 1969) was an East German shot putter.

== Biography ==
She won the gold medal at the 1986 World Junior Championships and a silver medal at the 1988 World Junior Championships. Her personal best throw was 18.94 metres, achieved in May 1988 in Halle. This places her among the best junior athletes (age 19 and less) of all time. However, she lacked significant achievements on the senior level due to an unsuccessful knee surgery.

== Achievements ==
Year	Competition	Venue	Position	Event	Notes
Representing East Germany
1986	World Junior Championships	Athens, Greece	1st	Shot put	18.39 m
1988	World Junior Championships	Sudbury, Canada	2nd	Shot put	17.84 m
