= 1988 World Junior Championships in Athletics – Women's shot put =

The women's shot put event at the 1988 World Junior Championships in Athletics was held in Sudbury, Ontario, Canada, at Laurentian University Stadium on 27 and 28 July.

== Medalists ==
Gold	Ines Wittich; East Germany
Silver	Heike Rohrmann; East Germany
Bronze	Ella Polyakova; Soviet Union

== Results ==
=== Final ===
28 July

Rank	Name	Nationality	Result	Notes
1st place, gold medalist(s)	Ines Wittich	East Germany	18.54	
2nd place, silver medalist(s)	Heike Rohrmann	East Germany	17.84	
3rd place, bronze medalist(s)	Ella Polyakova	Soviet Union	17.10	
4	Svetlana Krivelyova	Soviet Union	16.91	
5	Petya Zhecheva	Bulgaria	16.66	
6	Gabriele Völkl	West Germany	16.56	
7	Diana Stoyanova	Bulgaria	16.48	
8	Zhang Liuhong	China	15.43	
9	Katja Bick	West Germany	15.27	
10	Angie Ryker	United States	14.67	
11	Justine Buttle	United Kingdom	14.65	
12	Anne Brouzet	France	14.53	

=== Qualifications ===
27 Jul

==== Group A ====
Rank	Name	Nationality	Result	Notes
1	Ines Wittich	East Germany	17.74	Q
2	Heike Rohrmann	East Germany	17.18	Q
3	Ella Polyakova	Soviet Union	16.71	Q
4	Svetlana Krivelyova	Soviet Union	16.24	Q
5	Gabriele Völkl	West Germany	15.92	Q
6	Diana Stoyanova	Bulgaria	15.55	Q
7	Petya Zhecheva	Bulgaria	15.31	Q
8	Zhang Liuhong	China	14.91	Q
9	Katja Bick	West Germany	14.81	Q
10	Anne Brouzet	France	14.73	Q
11	Angie Ryker	United States	14.65	Q
12	Justine Buttle	United Kingdom	14.33	q
13	Nicole Carkeek	Australia	14.13	
14	Wang Hong	China	14.01	
15	Teresa Machado	Portugal	13.99	
16	Christy Ward	United States	13.06	
17	Alexandra Amaro	Brazil	12.94	
18	Kelly-Anne Kempf	Canada	12.90	

== Participation ==
According to an unofficial count, 18 athletes from 12 countries participated in the event.

- Australia (1)
- Brazil (1)
- Bulgaria (2)
- Canada (1)
- China (2)
- East Germany (2)
- France (1)
- Portugal (1)
- Soviet Union (2)
- United Kingdom (1)
- United States (2)
- West Germany (2)
