= Olga Shchukina =

Uzbek shot putter

Personal information
- Full name: Olga Shchukina
- Nationality: Uzbekistan
- Born: 6 April 1977 (age 49) Tashkent, Uzbek SSR, Soviet Union
- Height: 1.80 m (5 ft 11 in)
- Weight: 95 kg (209 lb)

Sport
- Sport: Athletics
- Event: Shot put

Achievements and titles
- Personal best: Shot put: 17.26 (2004)

Olga Nikolaevna Shchukina (Uzbek: Ольга Николаевна Щукина; born 6 April 1977, in Tashkent) is a retired Uzbek shot putter. Shchukina was selected to the Uzbek Olympic squad in the shot put at the 2004 Summer Olympics, but her feat had been outweighed with a doping failure for testing positive on clenbuterol during the pre-competition screening, which resulted to her immediate expulsion from the Games. During her athletic career, Shchukina launched her personal best shot of 17.26 at the 2004 Asian Cup League Meeting in Bishkek, Kyrgyzstan.

Shchukina qualified for the Uzbek squad in the women's shot put at the 2004 Summer Olympics in Athens, by posting an Olympic B-standard throw of 17.26 metres from the Asian Cup League Meeting in Bishkek, Kyrgyzstan. She unleashed a ball with her best throw of 14.44 metres on the third attempt of the prelims to obtain the last spot in a vast field of thirty-eight shot putters. On August 20, 2004, two days after her shot put feat at the Ancient Olympia Stadium, Shchukina tested positive for the banned anabolic agent clenbuterol during the pre-competition screening process, and was formally expelled from the Games by the International Olympic Committee. Admittedly, she ingested the substance inadvertently with a cough syrup that spurred her failure to the doping test.

In 2004 she completed her sports career.
