= Ines Wittich =

German shot putter

Ines Wittich (born 14 November 1969) is a retired German shot putter.

She represented the sports clubs TV Wattenscheid and TSV Bayer 04 Leverkusen, and won the bronze medal at the German championships in 1998.

Her personal best throw was 19.48 metres, achieved in July 1987 in Leipzig.

== Achievements ==
| Year | Competition | Venue | Position | Event | Notes |
Representing East Germany
| 1986 | World Junior Championships | Athens, Greece | 3rd | Shot put | 18.19 m |
| 1987 | European Junior Championships | Birmingham, England | 2nd | Shot put | 19.34 m |
| 1988 | World Junior Championships | Sudbury, Canada | 1st | Shot put | 18.54 m |
Representing Germany
| 1994 | European Indoor Championships | Paris, France | 8th | Shot put | 17.89 m |
