= Mihaela Oană =

Romanian shot putter (born 1968)

Mihaela Oana (born 11 November 1968) is a Romanian shot putter.

She competed at the 1991 World Championships without reaching the final. She finished tenth at the 1991 World Indoor Championships, sixth at the 1991 European Cup "A" Final, eighth at the 1992 European Indoor Championships, fifth at the 1992 IAAF World Cup, eleventh at the 1993 World Indoor Championships, seventh at the 1994 European Indoor Championships, seventh at the 1995 World Indoor Championships, and eighth at the 1998 European Indoor Championships. Regionally she won the gold medals at the 1990, 1992 and 1994 Balkan Championships, finished second at the 1996 Balkan Championships and won the gold medal at the 1998 Balkan Indoor Championships.

Oana became Romanian champion in 1991, succeeding Mihaela Loghin who had won all Romanian titles but one between 1976 and 1990. Oana continued to win in 1992, 1993, 1994 and 1998, with Elena Hila and Livia Mehes also taking titles in between and after. Oana's personal best throw was 19.90 metres, achieved in February 1994 in Bucharest. She attended the University of Cluj.
