= Mara Rosolen =

Italian shot putter (born 1965)

Personal information
- Nationality: Italian
- Born: 27 July 1965 (age 61) Motta di Livenza, Italy
- Height: 1.76 m (5 ft 9 1/2 in)
- Weight: 75 kg (165 lb)

Sport
- Country: Italy
- Sport: Athletics
- Events: Sprint; Standing long jump Discus throw Shot put
- Club: G.S. Fiamme Oro

Achievements and titles
- Personal best: Shot put 18.81 m (2000)
Medal record
Mediterranean Games
| Gold medal – first place | 1997 Bari | Shot put |
| Bronze medal – third place | 1991 Athens | Shot put |

Mara Rosolen (born 27 July 1965 in Motta di Livenza, Treviso) is a retired female shot putter from Italy. She won two medals at the Mediterranean Games. She set her personal best (18.81 metres) on 20 August 2000 in Avezzano.

== Achievements ==
| Year | Competition | Venue | Position | Event | Notes |
|---|---|---|---|---|---|
| 1991 | Mediterranean Games | Athens, Greece | 3rd | Shot put | 15.95 m |
| 1991 | Universiade | Sheffield, United Kingdom | 8th | Discus throw | 52.48 m |
| 1992 | European Indoor Championships | Genoa, Italy | 11th | Shot put | 16.26 m |
| 1993 | Mediterranean Games | Narbonne, France | 4th | Shot put | 15.94 m |
| 1993 | Universiade | Buffalo, United States | 7th | Shot put | 16.04 m |
| 1993 | Universiade | Buffalo, United States | 16th (q) | Discus throw | 50.78 m |
| 1995 | World Championships | Gothenburg, Sweden | 16th (q) | Shot put | 16.90 m |
| 1996 | European Indoor Championships | Stockholm, Sweden | 10th | Shot put | 16.12 m |
| 1997 | World Indoor Championships | Paris, France | 7th | Shot put | 18.38 m |
| 1997 | Mediterranean Games | Bari, Italy | 1st | Shot put | 17.82 m |
| 1997 | World Championships | Athens, Greece | 13th (q) | Shot put | 17.87 m |
| 1998 | European Indoor Championships | Valencia, Spain | 12th | Shot put | 16.68 m |
| 1998 | European Championships | Budapest, Hungary | 14th (q) | Shot put | 17.08 m |
| 1999 | World Championships | Seville, Spain | 14th (q) | Shot put | 17.84 m |
| 2000 | European Indoor Championships | Ghent, Belgium | – | Shot put | NM |
| 2000 | Olympic Games | Sydney, Australia | 19th (q) | Shot put | 16.66 m |

== National titles ==
Rosolen has won thirteen individual titles at the Italian Athletics Championships.

- 5 wins in Shot put (1994, 1996, 1997, 1998, 2000)
- 2 wins in Discus throw (1994, 1999)
- 6 wins in Shot put (1995, 1996, 1997, 1998, 1999, 2000)

== See also ==
- Italian all-time lists - Shot put
