= Angelo Iannelli (runner) =

Italian athletics competitor (born 1976)

Personal information
- Nationality: Italian
- Born: 27 July 1976 (age 49) Maddaloni

Sport
- Country: Italy
- Sport: Athletics
- Event(s): Long-distance running 3000 metres steeplechase
- Club: G.S. Fiamme Azzurre

Achievements and titles
- Personal best: 3000 m st: 8:26.96 (2007)
Medal record
European Cup
| Bronze medal – third place | 2003 Florence | 3000 m steeplechase |

Angelo Iannelli (born 27 July 1976) is an Italian retired male long-distance runner and steeplechase runner, who competed at the 2003 World Championships in Athletics.

== Biography ==
During his career he won a medal in a Continental competitions, in Florence at the 2003 European Cup Super League.

== Achievements ==
| Year | Competition | Venue | Position | Event | Time | Notes |
|---|---|---|---|---|---|---|
| 2003 | European Cup (Super League) | (Italy) Florence | 3rd | 3000 m st | 8:30.40 | |
| 2003 | World Championships | (France) Paris | Heat | 3000 m st | 8:36.08 | |
