= Athletics at the 1996 Summer Olympics – Women's shot put =

Women's shot put at the Games of the XXVI Olympiad
- Pictogram for athletics
- Venue: Centennial Olympic Stadium
- Date: 31 July 1996 (qualifications); 2 August 1996 (finals)
- Competitors: 25 from 16 nations
- Winning distance: 20.56

Medalists
1st place, gold medalist(s)		Astrid Kumbernuss; Germany
2nd place, silver medalist(s)		Xinmei Sui; China
3rd place, bronze medalist(s)		Irina Khudoroshkina; Russia

These are the official results of the women's shot put event at the 1996 Summer Olympics, held on July 31, 1996, at the Turner Field in Atlanta, Georgia. There were a total number of 27 competitors, with two non-starters. The top 12 and ties, and all those reaching 18.80 metres advanced to the final.

== Medalists ==
Gold	Astrid Kumbernuss; Germany
Silver	Xinmei Sui; China
Bronze	Irina Khudoroshkina; Russia

== Abbreviations ==
- All results shown are in metres

Q	automatic qualification
q	qualification by rank
DNS	did not start
NM	no mark
OR	olympic record
WR	world record
AR	area record
NR	national record
PB	personal best
SB	season best

== Records ==
Standing records prior to the 1996 Summer Olympics
World Record	Natalya Lisovskaya (URS)	22.63 m	June 7, 1987	Moscow, Soviet Union
Olympic Record	Ilona Slupianek (GDR)	22.41 m	July 24, 1980	Moscow, Soviet Union

== Qualification ==
=== Group A ===
Rank	Overall	Athlete	Attempts			Distance	Note
Rank	Overall	Athlete	1	2	3	Distance	Note
1	1	Astrid Kumbernuss (GER)	19.93	—	—	19.93 m	
2	5	Connie Price-Smith (USA)	18.79	X	19.08	19.08 m	
3	6	Vita Pavlysh (UKR)	17.49	19.04	—	19.04 m	
4	7	Irina Korzhanenko (RUS)	X	18.92	—	18.92 m	
5	13	Yumileidi Cumbá (CUB)	18.44	18.55	18.47	18.55 m	
6	14	Li Meisu (CHN)	17.88	X	18.39	18.39 m	
7	15	Svetlana Krivelyova (RUS)	18.23	17.60	17.86	18.23 m	
8	16	Valeyta Althouse (USA)	17.62	17.54	18.16	18.16 m	
9	17	Elvira Urusova (GEO)	16.61	17.27	17.69	17.69 m	
10	19	Karoliina Lundahl (FIN)	17.14	16.97	X	17.14 m	
11	22	Yelena Baltabayeva (KAZ)	16.40	X	15.35	16.40 m	
12	23	Teresa Machado (POR)	15.91	15.62	15.60	15.91 m	
—	—	Huang Zhihong (CHN)	—	—	—	DNS	

=== Group B ===
Rank	Overall	Athlete	Attempts			Distance	Note
Rank	Overall	Athlete	1	2	3	Distance	Note
1	2	Sui Xinmei (CHN)	19.36	—	—	19.36 m	
2	3	Stephanie Storp (GER)	19.29	—	—	19.29 m	
3	4	Valentyna Fedyushyna (UKR)	19.22	—	—	19.22 m	
4	7	Irina Khudoroshkina (RUS)	X	17.73	19.03	19.03 m	
5	8	Kathrin Neimke (GER)	19.02	—	—	19.02 m	
6	10	Belsy Laza (CUB)	18.15	18.61	18.58	18.61 m	
7	11	Judy Oakes (GBR)	18.37	18.56	18.45	18.56 m	
8	12	Ramona Pagel (USA)	17.61	18.55	18.48	18.55 m	
9	18	Svetla Mitkova (BUL)	17.41	17.48	17.30	17.48 m	
10	20	Lee Myung-Sun (KOR)	15.90	16.92	16.64	16.92 m	
11	21	Elisângela Adriano (BRA)	X	16.49	14.61	16.49 m	
12	24	Nada Kawar (JOR)	15.28	X	14.73	15.28 m	
13	25	Lisa Misipeka (ASA)	13.40	13.72	13.74	13.74 m	
—	—	Corrie de Bruin (NED)	—	—	—	DNS	

== Final ==
Rank	Athlete	Attempts						Distance	Note
Rank	Athlete	1	2	3	4	5	6	Distance	Note
1st place, gold medalist(s)	Astrid Kumbernuss (GER)	20.56	X	19.67	X	X	20.47	20.56 m	
2nd place, silver medalist(s)	Sui Xinmei (CHN)	19.06	18.95	19.88	19.24	19.21	19.43	19.88 m	
3rd place, bronze medalist(s)	Irina Khudoroshkina (RUS)	19.35	X	X	X	—	—	19.35 m	
4	Vita Pavlysh (UKR)	17.30	18.20	19.30	18.21	19.23	X	19.30 m	
5	Connie Price-Smith (USA)	18.44	18.61	19.22	X	X	X	19.22 m	
6	Stephanie Storp (GER)	18.91	X	X	18.06	18.25	19.06	19.06 m	
7	Kathrin Neimke (GER)	17.87	18.40	18.92	X	18.62	18.65	18.92 m	
8	Irina Korzhanenko (RUS)	18.43	X	18.55	18.65	18.50	18.68	18.68 m	
9	Ramona Pagel (USA)	16.57	18.48	17.55				18.48 m	
10	Belsy Laza (CUB)	X	18.40	18.40				18.40 m	
11	Judy Oakes (GBR)	18.34	18.10	18.18				18.34 m	
12	Valentyna Fedyushyna (UKR)	X	X	17.99				17.99 m	

== See also ==
- 1995 World Championships in Athletics – Women's Shot Put
- 1996 Shot Put Year Ranking
- 1997 World Championships in Athletics – Women's Shot Put
