= Athletics at the 2004 Summer Olympics – Women's shot put =

Women's shot put at the Games of the XXVIII Olympiad
- Olympic Athletics
- Venue: Ancient Olympia Stadium
- Dates: 18 August
- Competitors: 38 from 29 nations
- Winning distance: 19.59

Medalists
1st place, gold medalist(s)		Yumileidi Cumbá	Cuba
2nd place, silver medalist(s)		Nadine Kleinert	Germany
3rd place, bronze medalist(s)		not awarded	

The women's shot put at the 2004 Summer Olympics in Athens was held on 18 August 2004 at the Ancient Olympia Stadium. It was originally planned to hold the discus throw at this venue, but it was discovered that the field was not large enough to accommodate the range of modern discus throwers, and would have posed a danger to spectators. As such, it was decided instead to hold the shot put at the site, despite the fact that the shot put was not contested at the Ancient Olympic Games. There were 38 competitors from 28 nations. After a series of doping-related disqualifications, the event was won by Yumileidi Cumba of Cuba, the nation's first medal in the event. All distances are given in metres.

== Disqualifications ==
On 23 August 2004, Irina Korzhanenko of Russia was stripped of her gold medal and received a lifetime ban by the International Olympic Committee (as it was her second doping offense after 1999) after she tested positive for the steroid stanozolol. Accordingly, Cuba's Yumileidi Cumbá, Germany's Nadine Kleinert, and Korzhanenko's teammate Svetlana Krivelyova were upgraded to the medal positions.

On 5 December 2012, eight years after the official medal ceremony, Krivelyova was disqualified and stripped of her bronze medal after a re-analysis of her 2004 sample tested positive for oxandrolone. The bronze medal was not re-awarded. Аs the next two finishers Nadzeya Astapchuk and Natallia Kharaneka had both been banned for doping offenses since 2004, the IOC decided to declare the bronze medal vacant (in the official publication of the results, Nadzeya Astapchuk is listed third, but without getting a bronze medal).

== Competition format ==
Each athlete receives three throws in the qualifying round. All who achieve the qualifying distance progress to the final. If less than twelve athletes achieve this mark, then the twelve furthest throwing athletes reach the final. Each finalist is allowed three throws in last round, with the top eight athletes after that point being given three further attempts.

== Schedule ==
All times are Greece Standard Time (UTC+2)

Date	Time	Round
Wednesday, 18 August 2004	08:30; 16:00	Qualification; Final

== Records ==
Prior to the competition, the existing World and Olympic records were as follows.

World record	Natalya Lisovskaya (URS)	22.63 m	Moscow, Soviet Union	7 June 1987
Olympic record	Ilona Slupianek (GDR)	22.41 m	Moscow, Soviet Union	24 July 1980

No new records were set during the competition.

== Results ==
=== Qualifying round ===
Rule: Qualifying standard 18.50 (Q) or at least 12 best qualified (q).

Rank	Group	Name	Nationality	#1	#2	#3	Result	Notes
1	B	Nadzeya Astapchuk	Belarus	19.69	—	—	19.69	Q
2	A	Irina Korzhanenko	Russia	19.43	—	—	19.43	Q
3	A	Yumileidi Cumbá	Cuba	19.10	—	—	19.10	Q
4	B	Cleopatra Borel	Trinidad and Tobago	18.90	—	—	18.90	Q, NR
5	A	Valerie Adams	New Zealand	18.79	—	—	18.79	Q
6	A	Nadine Kleinert	Germany	18.65	—	—	18.65	Q
7	A	Krystyna Zabawska	Poland	18.05	18.61	—	18.61	Q
8	B	Svetlana Krivelyova	Russia	18.45	17.89	18.57	18.57	Q
9	A	Natallia Kharaneka	Belarus	17.70	18.52	—	18.52	Q
10	B	Lieja Tunks	Netherlands	18.38	x	18.33	18.38	q
11	A	Misleydis González	Cuba	18.33	x	18.15	18.33	q
12	B	Li Meiju	China	18.16	18.01	18.13	18.16	q
13	B	Kalliopi Ouzouni	Greece	18.03	17.87	x	18.03	
14	B	Olga Ryabinkina	Russia	18.00	x	17.99	18.00	
15	B	Fior Vásquez	Dominican Republic	16.00	17.99	17.08	17.99	SB
16	B	Astrid Kumbernuss	Germany	17.89	17.52	17.86	17.89	
17	A	Laurence Manfredi	France	17.78	17.05	17.20	17.78	
18	A	Elisângela Adriano	Brazil	17.31	17.07	17.44	17.44	
19	B	Irini Terzoglou	Greece	17.34	x	—	17.34	
20	B	Oksana Zakharchuk	Ukraine	17.19	17.28	x	17.28	
21	A	Zhang Xiaoyu	China	17.03	17.22	16.21	17.22	
22	B	Kristin Heaston	United States	16.41	x	17.17	17.17	
23	B	Nadine Beckel	Germany	17.11	17.03	x	17.11	
24	A	Li Fengfeng	China	16.80	16.36	16.90	16.90	
25	A	Zhang Guirong	Singapore	16.58	16.51	x	16.58	
26	B	Juttaporn Krasaeyan	Thailand	16.45	16.49	16.22	16.49	
27	A	Laura Gerraughty	United States	15.94	x	16.47	16.47	
28	A	Kimberly Barrett	Jamaica	15.80	16.45	16.09	16.45	
29	A	Lee Mi-young	South Korea	15.76	16.35	x	16.35	
30	B	Irache Quintanal	Spain	15.27	15.99	15.52	15.99	
31	B	Aneliya Kumanova	Bulgaria	15.49	15.91	15.50	15.91	
32	B	Chinatsu Mori	Japan	15.86	14.59	x	15.86	
33	B	Ana Po'uhila	Tonga	14.16	15.33	15.08	15.33	
34	A	Filiz Kadoğan	Turkey	15.20	14.73	x	15.20	
35	A	Mariam Kevkhishvili	Georgia	14.10	15.02	15.06	15.06	
36	A	Iolanta Ulyeva	Kazakhstan	14.48	14.55	14.88	14.88	
37	B	Éva Kürti	Hungary	14.60	x	x	14.60	
	A	Olga Shchukina	Uzbekistan	~~14.19~~	~~14.13~~	~~14.44~~	~~14.44~~	DSQ

- Olga Shchukina of Uzbekistan was disqualified after she tested positive for clenbuterol during the pre-competition screening process.

=== Final ===
Rank	Athlete	Nationality	1	2	3	4	5	6	Result	Notes
1st place, gold medalist(s)	Yumileidi Cumbá	Cuba	x	18.39	18.74	x	x	19.59	19.59	
2nd place, silver medalist(s)	Nadine Kleinert	Germany	18.77	19.55	19.17	18.55	x	x	19.55	SB
3rd place, bronze medalist(s)	not awarded									^{[note]}
3	Nadzeya Astapchuk	Belarus	18.25	x	19.01	x	x	x	19.01	^{[note]}
4	Natallia Kharaneka	Belarus	18.82	18.09	18.87	17.80	18.59	18.96	18.96	
5	Krystyna Zabawska	Poland	x	17.97	18.64	x	18.60	x	18.64	
6	Misleydis González	Cuba	17.33	18.25	18.59	18.52	x	x	18.59	
7	Valerie Adams	New Zealand	18.56	x	17.93				18.56	
8	Li Meiju	China	17.82	17.61	18.37				18.37	
9	Cleopatra Borel	Trinidad and Tobago	17.37	18.28	18.35				18.35	
10	Lieja Tunks	Netherlands	x	18.13	18.14				18.14	
—	Irina Korzhanenko	Russia	~~20.41~~	~~20.70~~	~~21.06~~	~~20.04~~	~~x~~	~~x~~	~~21.06~~	DSQ
—	Svetlana Krivelyova	Russia	~~18.55~~	~~19.49~~	~~19.29~~	~~19.15~~	~~19.20~~	~~18.44~~	~~19.49~~	DSQ

^{note} IOC decided to declare the bronze medal vacant (in the official publication of the results, Nadzeya Astapchuk is listed third, but without getting a bronze medal).
