= 1994 World Junior Championships in Athletics – Women's discus throw =

The women's discus throw event at the 1994 World Junior Championships in Athletics was held in Lisbon, Portugal, at Estádio Universitário de Lisboa on 23 and 24 July.

== Medalists ==
Gold	Corrie de Bruin; Netherlands
Silver	Sabine Sievers; Germany
Bronze	Suzy Powell; United States

== Results ==
=== Final ===
24 July

Rank	Name	Nationality	Attempts						Result	Notes
Rank	Name	Nationality	1	2	3	4	5	6	Result	Notes
1st place, gold medalist(s)	Corrie de Bruin	Netherlands	x	53.02	53.98	55.18	x	53.14	55.18	
2nd place, silver medalist(s)	Sabine Sievers	Germany	52.66	53.42	54.86	51.52	x	x	54.86	
3rd place, bronze medalist(s)	Suzy Powell	United States	48.90	50.42	52.08	48.50	50.52	52.62	52.62	
4	Claudia Mues	Germany	46.72	51.48	x	47.86	48.78	52.60	52.60	
5	Olga Tsander	Belarus	51.90	x	48.10	x	47.72	x	51.90	
6	Yu Qingmei	China	x	49.70	x	48.92	51.32	x	51.32	
7	Veerle Blondeel	Belgium	50.26	x	x	47.34	48.26	51.28	51.28	
8	Monique Nacsa	Australia	50.06	48.92	x	46.22	47.52	x	50.06	
9	Kirsi Lindfors	Finland	x	49.58	x				49.58	
10	Agnieszka Ptaszkiewicz	Poland	44.12	48.58	48.86				48.86	
11	Sonia O'Farrill	Cuba	45.32	48.08	x				48.08	
12	Grete Etholm	Norway	x	x	38.92				38.92	

=== Qualifications ===
23 Jul

==== Group A ====
Rank	Name	Nationality	Attempts			Result	Notes
Rank	Name	Nationality	1	2	3	Result	Notes
1	Sabine Sievers	Germany	x	52.78	-	52.78	Q
2	Corrie de Bruin	Netherlands	52.24	-	-	52.24	Q
3	Veerle Blondeel	Belgium	51.50	-	-	51.50	Q
4	Agnieszka Ptaszkiewicz	Poland	45.70	49.66	-	49.66	Q
5	Sonia O'Farrill	Cuba	x	44.02	48.10	48.10	q
6	Grete Etholm	Norway	44.62	x	47.92	47.92	q
7	Caroline Fournier	Mauritius	44.78	47.16	46.52	47.16	
8	Miyoko Nakanishi	Japan	45.94	x	45.94	45.94	
9	Anna Rusakova	Russia	x	43.08	43.98	43.98	
10	Tamika Powell	United States	42.48	x	x	42.48	

==== Group B ====
Rank	Name	Nationality	Attempts			Result	Notes
Rank	Name	Nationality	1	2	3	Result	Notes
1	Yu Qingmei	China	54.88	-	-	54.88	Q
2	Olga Tsander	Belarus	x	x	51.26	51.26	Q
3	Kirsi Lindfors	Finland	x	51.06	x	51.06	Q
4	Suzy Powell	United States	50.40	-	-	50.40	Q
5	Claudia Mues	Germany	49.74	-	-	49.74	Q
6	Monique Nacsa	Australia	49.56	-	-	49.56	Q
7	Barbara Sugár	Hungary	43.52	42.00	44.40	44.40	
8	Lieja Koeman	Netherlands	43.20	x	x	43.20	
9	Kyriaki Pilia	Cyprus	36.70	41.60	38.16	41.60	
10	Viktorija Florjan	Croatia	37.70	40.42	40.46	40.46	
11	Yesica García	Honduras	x	27.54	30.40	40.00	

== Participation ==
According to an unofficial count, 21 athletes from 18 countries participated in the event.

- Australia (1)
- Belarus (1)
- Belgium (1)
- China (1)
- Croatia (1)
- Cuba (1)
- Cyprus (1)
- Finland (1)
- Germany (2)
- Honduras (1)
- Hungary (1)
- Japan (1)
- Mauritius (1)
- Netherlands (2)
- Norway (1)
- Poland (1)
- Russia (1)
- United States (2)
