= Athletics at the 1991 Summer Universiade – Women's discus throw =

The women's discus throw event at the 1991 Summer Universiade was held at the Don Valley Stadium in Sheffield on 20 and 21 July 1991.

== Medalists ==
Gold	Silver	Bronze
Xiao Yanling; China	Qiu Qiaoping; China	Antonia Patoka; Soviet Union

== Results ==
=== Qualification ===
Rank	Athlete	Nationality	Result	Notes
1	Xiao Yanling	China	62.68	q
2	Qiu Qiaoping	China	60.14	q
3	Antonia Patoka	Soviet Union	58.72	q
4	Olga Burova	Soviet Union	56.36	q
5	Lenora Barnes	United States	56.04	q
6	Sonia Godall	Spain	56.00	q
7	Isabelle Devaluez	France	55.10	q
8	Mara Rosolen	Italy	52.86	q
9	Anna Mosdell	Canada	51.70	q
10	Agnes Deselaers	Germany	51.64	q
11	Lidia Rognini	Italy	51.20	q
12	Felicity Johnston	Australia	49.02	q
13	Karin Colberg	Sweden	48.80	
14	Dominggas Yansip	Indonesia	38.76	

=== Final ===
Rank	Athlete	Nationality	#1	#2	#3	#4	#5	#6	Result	Notes
1st place, gold medalist(s)	Xiao Yanling	China	55.70	61.72	57.72	x	64.36	x	64.36	
2nd place, silver medalist(s)	Qiu Qiaoping	China							62.40	
3rd place, bronze medalist(s)	Antonia Patoka	Soviet Union							62.22	
4	Olga Burova	Soviet Union							59.88	
5	Lenora Barnes	United States							59.78	
6	Sonia Godall	Spain							55.30	
7	Agnes Deselaers	Germany							54.52	
8	Mara Rosolen	Italy							52.48	
9	Lidia Rognini	Italy							52.22	
10	Isabelle Devaluez	France							51.92	
11	Anna Mosdell	Canada							51.00	
12	Felicity Johnston	Australia							50.56	
