= Belsy Laza =

Cuban shot putter

Personal information
- Born: 5 June 1967 (age 59) Guantánamo, Cuba

Sport
- Sport: Track and field
Medal record
Representing Cuba
Summer Universiade
Silver medal – second place	1989 Duisburg	Shot put
Silver medal – second place	1993 Buffalo	Shot put
Pan American Games
Gold medal – first place	1991 Havana	Shot put
Bronze medal – third place	1987 Indianapolis	Shot put
Central American and Caribbean Games
Gold medal – first place	1990 Mexico City	Shot put

Belsy Laza Muñoz (born 5 June 1967) is a retired Cuban shot putter. Her personal best put was 20.96 metres, achieved in May 1992 in Mexico City. This is the current North America, Central America and the Caribbean (NACAC) record.

== Achievements ==
Year	Competition	Venue	Position	Event	Notes
Representing Cuba
1986	Ibero-American Championships	Havana, Cuba	1st	Shot put	15.93 m
1987	Pan American Games	Indianapolis, United States	3rd	Shot put	18.06 m
1988	Ibero-American Championships	Mexico City, Mexico	1st	Shot put	17.23 m A
1989	World Indoor Championships	Budapest, Hungary	6th	Shot put	19.32 m
1989	Universiade	Duisburg, West Germany	2nd	Shot put	19.32 m
1989	World Cup	Barcelona, Spain	5th	Shot put	19.02 m
1990	Goodwill Games	Seattle, United States	3rd	Shot put	18.98 m
1990	Central American and Caribbean Games	Mexico City, Mexico	1st	Shot put	17.73 m
1991	World Indoor Championships	Seville, Spain	5th	Shot put	18.91 m
1991	Pan American Games	Havana, Cuba	1st	Shot put	18.87 m
1991	World Championships	Tokyo, Japan	9th	Shot put	18.49 m
1992	Ibero-American Championships	Seville, Spain	1st	Shot put	19.31 m
1992	Olympic Games	Barcelona, Spain	4th	Shot put	19.70 m
1992	World Cup	Havana, Cuba	1st	Shot put	19.19 m
1993	World Indoor Championships	Toronto, Canada	7th	Shot put	18.75 m
1993	Universiade	Buffalo, United States	2nd	Shot put	18.48 m
1993	World Championships	Stuttgart, Germany	8th	Shot put	19.27 m
1994	Goodwill Games	St. Petersburg, Russia	9th	Shot put	17.53 m
1994	World Cup	London, United Kingdom	2nd	Shot put	19.07 m
1995	Pan American Games	Mar del Plata, Argentina	4th	Shot put	18.31 m
1995	Central American and Caribbean Championships	Guatemala City, Guatemala	1st	Shot put	17.64 m
1996	Olympic Games	Atlanta, United States	10th	Shot put	18.40 m
1999	Pan American Games	Winnipeg, Canada	5th	Shot put	17.69 m
