= Elvira Urusova =

Georgian shot putter

Personal information
- Nationality: Georgian
- Born: 24 February 1968 (age 58)

Sport
- Sport: Athletics
- Event: Shot put

Elvira Urusova (born 24 February 1968) is a Georgian athlete. She competed in the women's shot put at the 1996 Summer Olympics.
