= Oksana Zakharchuk =

Ukrainian shot putter (born 1980)

Personal information
- Full name: Oksana Volodymyrivna; Zakharchuk
- Nationality: Ukraine
- Born: 3 April 1980 (age 46) Ostroh, Ukrainian SSR, Soviet Union
- Height: 1.80 m (5 ft 11 in)
- Weight: 80 kg (176 lb)

Sport
- Sport: Athletics
- Event: Shot put

Achievements and titles
- Personal best: Shot put: 19.05 (2004)
Medal record
Women's athletics
Representing Ukraine
European Youth Olympic Festival
Gold medal – first place	1997 Lisbon	Shot put

Oksana Volodymyrivna Zakharchuk (Ukrainian: Оксана Володимирівна Захарчук; born April 3, 1980, in Ostroh) is a retired Ukrainian shot putter. She represented Ukraine in the women's shot put at the 2004 Summer Olympics, and also set a personal best of 19.05 metres from the national athletics meet in Kyiv.

Zakharchuk qualified for the Ukrainian squad in the women's shot put at the 2004 Summer Olympics in Athens. Nearly a week before the Games commenced, she attained a personal best and an Olympic A-standard of 19.05 metres on her last bid from the national athletics meet in Kyiv. During the prelims, Zakharchuk unleashed the ball into the field with her best possible effort at 17.28 on her second attempt, falling short to reach her two-week-old personal best by 177 centimetres. As she committed a foul in her final shot, Zakharchuk's feat was worthily enough to secure a twentieth spot from a roster of thirty-eight athletes in the overall standings, nearly missing out the final round by 0.88 metres behind the last qualifier Li Meiju of China.
