= Irina Korzhanenko =

Russian shot putter (born 1974)

Personal information
- Born: 16 May 1974 (age 52) Azov, Soviet Union

Sport
- Sport: Track and field
Medal record
Representing Russia
World Indoor Championships
Gold medal – first place	2003 Birmingham	Shot put
Bronze medal – third place	1997 Paris	Shot put
European Athletics Indoor Championships
Gold medal – first place	1998 Valencia	Shot put
European Championships
Gold medal – first place	2002 Munich	Shot put
Silver medal – second place	1998 Budapest	Shot put
Summer Universiade
Gold medal – first place	1997 Catania	Shot put

Irina Nikolayevna Korzhanenko (Russian: Ирина Николаевна Коржаненко; born 16 May 1974) is a former Russian shot putter. She gained international recognition when she won a bronze medal at the 1997 IAAF World Indoor Championships. In the following years she became European Indoor champion, European champion and World Indoor champion.

== Doping ==
Korzhanenko tested positive for doping at the 1999 IAAF World Indoor Championships. She lost the silver medal and was handed a two-year doping suspension.

At the 2004 Summer Olympics, she originally won the gold medal in shot put, but tested positive for stanozolol and was stripped of the medal. She later received a life ban from the IAAF in a Memorandum of 21 September 2005. Korzhanenko refused to return the gold medal, despite the pressure of the International Athletics Federation's officials. As of 2023, she has not returned the gold medal.

== International competitions ==
Representing Russia
Year	Competition	Venue	Position	Event	Result	Notes
1995	World Championships	Gothenburg, Sweden	12th	Shot put	17.88 m	
1996	Olympic Games	Atlanta, United States	8th	Shot put	18.68 m	
1997	World Indoor Championships	Paris, France	3rd	Shot put	19.49 m	
1997	World Championships	Athens, Greece	16th	Shot put	17.80 m	
1997	Summer Universiade	Catania, Italy	1st	Shot put	19.39 m	
1997	IAAF Grand Prix Final	Fukuoka, Japan	3rd	Shot put	19.06 m	
1998	European Indoor Championships	Valencia, Spain	1st	Shot put	20.25 m	
1998	IAAF World Cup	Johannesburg, South Africa	2nd	Shot put	19.04 m	
1999	World Indoor Championships	Maebashi, Japan	DQ (2nd)	Shot put	20.56 m	Doping
2001	World Championships	Edmonton, Canada	5th	Shot put	19.35 m	
2002	European Championships	Munich, Germany	1st	Shot put	20.64 m	
2002	IAAF World Cup	Madrid, Spain	1st	Shot put	20.20 m	
2003	World Indoor Championships	Birmingham, United Kingdom	1st	Shot put	20.55 m	
2003	World Championships	Paris, France	4th	Shot put	19.17 m	
2003	IAAF World Athletics Final	Monte Carlo, Monaco	5th	Shot put	18.48 m	
2004	Olympic Games	Athens, Greece	DQ (1st)	Shot put	21.06 m	Doping

== See also ==
- List of doping cases in athletics
- List of stripped Olympic medals
- List of 2004 Summer Olympics medal winners
- List of IAAF World Indoor Championships medalists (women)
- List of European Athletics Championships medalists (women)
- List of European Athletics Indoor Championships medalists (women)
- Doping at the Olympic Games
- Doping in Russia
