= Corrie de Bruin =

Dutch athletics competitor

Personal information
- Born: October 26, 1976 (age 49) Dordrecht, South Holland, Netherlands

Sport
- Sport: Track and field
Medal record
Representing Netherlands
European Indoor Championships
Bronze medal – third place	1998 Valencia	Shot put
Summer Universiade
Silver medal – second place	1997 Catania	Shot put
Bronze medal – third place	1995 Fukuoka	Shot put

Corrie de Bruin (born October 26, 1976) is a retired discus thrower and shot putter from the Netherlands, who represented her native country at the 1996 Summer Olympics in Atlanta, United States. There she didn't reach the final, after having thrown 55.48 metres in the qualifying heats.

The younger sister of discus thrower Erik de Bruin, she was Holland's undisputed leading shot putter in the 1990s and played a leading role in discus throwing alongside Jacqueline Goormachtigh as well. De Bruin won the world title in discus throwing at the 1994 World Junior Championships in Athletics.

== Achievements ==
Year	Competition	Venue	Position	Event	Notes
Representing the Netherlands
1993	European Junior Championships	San Sebastián, Spain	3rd	Shot put	16.76 m
1993	European Junior Championships	San Sebastián, Spain	1st	Discus throw	55.30 m
1994	World Junior Championships	Lisbon, Portugal	4th	Shot put	16.79 m
1994	World Junior Championships	Lisbon, Portugal	1st	Discus throw	55.18 m
1994	European Championships	Helsinki, Finland	15th (q)	Shot put	16.66 m
1994	European Championships	Helsinki, Finland	20th (q)	Discus throw	54.76 m
1995	World Indoor Championships	Barcelona, Spain	10th	Shot put	16.90 m
1995	European Junior Championships	Nyíregyháza, Hungary	1st	Shot put	17.76 m
1995	European Junior Championships	Nyíregyháza, Hungary	1st	Discus throw	57.46 m
1995	World Championships	Gothenburg, Sweden	14th (q)	Shot put	17.01 m
1995	World Championships	Gothenburg, Sweden	20th (q)	Discus throw	58.14 m
1995	Universiade	Fukuoka, Japan	3rd	Shot put	17.82 m
1995	Universiade	Fukuoka, Japan	4th	Discus throw	59.12 m
1996	Olympic Games	Atlanta, United States	36th (q)	Discus throw	55.48 m
1997	World Indoor Championships	Paris, France	12th	Shot put	17.36 m
1997	European U23 Championships	Turku, Finland	2nd	Shot put	18.06 m
1997	European U23 Championships	Turku, Finland	1st	Discus throw	57.72 m
1997	Universiade	Catania, Italy	2nd	Shot put	18.65 m
1998	European Indoor Championships	Valencia, Spain	3rd	Shot put	18.97 m
1998	European Championships	Budapest, Hungary	7th	Shot put	18.28 m

Awards
Preceded by Sharon Jaklofsky	KNAU Cup; 1997, 1998	Succeeded by Lieja Koeman
