= Laurence Manfredi =

French shot putter

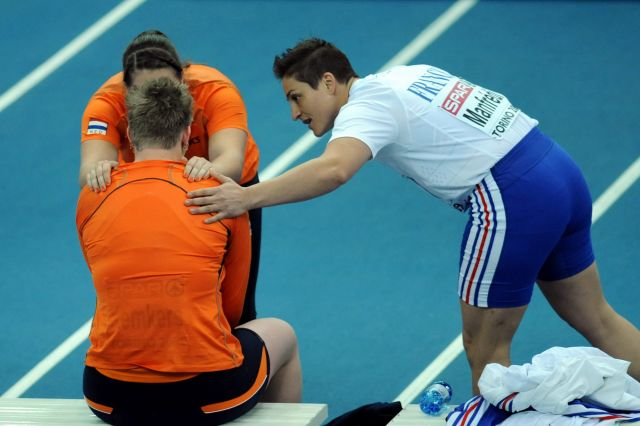
- Manfredi (right) at the 2009 European Indoor Championships

Medal record

Women's Athletics

Representing France

Mediterranean Games
Silver medal – second place	2005 Almería	Shot Put

Laurence Manfredi (born 20 May 1974 in Gap, Hautes-Alpes) is a French shot putter.

She finished fifth at the 2007 European Indoor Championships. She also competed at the World Championships in 1997, 1999 and 2003 and the Olympic Games in 2000 and 2004 without reaching the final round.

Manfredi has been a dominating figure in the national competitions – a win at the 2010 French Indoor Championships was the 30th national title of her career.

Her personal best throw is 18.68 metres, achieved in July 2000 in Castres.

== Competition record ==
Year	Competition	Venue	Position	Notes
Representing France
1996	European Indoor Championships	Stockholm, Sweden	9th	16.22 m
1997	Mediterranean Games	Bari, Italy	4th	17.23 m
1997	World Championships	Athens, Greece	21st (q)	17.02 m
1998	European Indoor Championships	Valencia, Spain	16th	16.37 m
1999	World Championships	Seville, Spain	13th (q)	17.89 m
2000	European Indoor Championships	Ghent, Belgium	11th (q)	17.51 m
2000	Olympic Games	Sydney, Australia	20th (q)	16.57 m
2001	Jeux de la Francophonie	Ottawa, Canada	3rd	16.82 m
2001	Mediterranean Games	Radès, Tunisia	4th	15.61 m
2003	World Championships	Paris, France	14th (q)	17.88 m
2004	World Indoor Championships	Budapest, Hungary	15th (q)	17.39 m
2004	Olympic Games	Athens, Greece	16th (q)	17.78 m
2005	European Indoor Championships	Madrid, Spain	10th (q)	16.32 m
2005	Mediterranean Games	Almería, Spain	2nd	17.47 m
2006	European Championships	Gothenburg, Sweden	13th (q)	16.95 m
2007	European Indoor Championships	Birmingham, United Kingdom	5th	18.02 m
2009	European Indoor Championships	Turin, Italy	7th	17.92 m
2009	World Championships	Berlin, Germany	21st (q)	17.25 m
