= Astrid Kumbernuss =

German athletics competitor

Personal information
- Nationality: German
- Born: 5 February 1970 (age 56) Grevesmühlen, Mecklenburg-Vorpommern, East Germany
- Years active: 1986-2004
- Height: 6 ft 1 in (1.85 m)
- Weight: 89 kg (196 lb)

Sport
- Country: East Germany (1986-1990); Germany (1991-2004)
- Sport: Athletics
- Event: Shot put
- Club: SC Neubrandenburg
- Turned pro: 1986
- Retired: 2004

Achievements and titles
- Personal best: 21.22 m (1995)
Medal record
Women's athletics
Representing Germany
Olympic Games
Gold medal – first place	1996 Atlanta	Shot put
Bronze medal – third place	2000 Sydney	Shot put
World Championships
Gold medal – first place	1995 Gothenburg	Shot put
Gold medal – first place	1997 Athens	Shot put
Gold medal – first place	1999 Seville	Shot put
European Championships
Silver medal – second place	1994 Helsinki	Shot put
Representing East Germany
European Championships
Gold medal – first place	1990 Split	Shot put

Astrid Kumbernuss (German pronunciation: [ˈas.tʁɪt ˈkʊmbɐˌnʊs]; born 5 February 1970 in Grevesmühlen, Mecklenburg-Vorpommern) is a former German female shot putter and discus thrower.

Her career started at the SC Neubrandenburg sports club. Her greatest successes were gold medals at the 1995, 1997 and 1999 World Championships in Athletics, and the 1996 Summer Olympics in Atlanta. In 1997, she was awarded Athlete of the Year. In 1998, she gave birth to her son Philip, and retired from her sports career in 2005.

== International competitions ==
Year	Competition	Venue	Position	Event	Notes
Representing East Germany
1988	World Junior Championships	Sudbury, Ontario, Canada	2nd	Discus throw	64.08 m
1990	European Championships	Split, Yugoslavia	1st	Shot put	20.38 m
Representing Germany
1992	European Indoor Championships	Genoa, Italy	3rd	Shot put	19.37 m
1993	World Championships	Stuttgart, Germany	6th	Shot put	19.42 m
1993	IAAF Grand Prix Final	London, England	2nd	Shot put	19.37 m
1994	European Championships	Helsinki, Finland	2nd	Shot put	19.49 m
1994	European Indoor Championships	Paris, France	1st	Shot put	19.44 m
1994	IAAF World Cup	London, England	3rd	Shot put	18.89 m
1995	IAAF Grand Prix Final	Monaco	1st	Shot put	20.20 m
1995	World Championships	Gothenburg, Sweden	1st	Shot put	21.22 m
1996	European Indoor Championships	Stockholm, Sweden	1st	Shot put	19.79 m
1996	Olympic Games	Atlanta, USA	1st	Shot put	20.56 m
1997	World Indoor Championships	Paris, France	2nd	Shot put	19.92 m
1997	World Championships	Athens, Greece	1st	Shot put	20.71 m
1997	IAAF Grand Prix Final	Fukuoka, Japan	1st	Shot put	20.95 m
1999	World Championships	Sevilla, Spain	1st	Shot put	19.85 m
1999	IAAF Grand Prix Final	Munich, Germany	2nd	Shot put	19.13 m
2000	European Indoor Championships	Ghent, Belgium	3rd	Shot put	19.12 m
2000	Olympic Games	Sydney, Australia	3rd	Shot put	19.62 m
2001	World Championships	Edmonton, Alberta	6th	Shot put	19.25 m
2001	IAAF Grand Prix Final	Melbourne, Australia	1st	Shot put	18.94 m
2002	European Championships	Munich, Germany	4th	Shot put	19.22 m
2002	IAAF World Cup	Madrid, Spain	3rd	Shot put	19.11 m
2003	World Indoor Championships	Birmingham, England	3rd	Shot put	19.86 m
2003	European Cup	Florence, Italy	1st	Shot put	19.46 m
2003	IAAF World Athletics Final	Monaco	4th	Shot put	18.89 m
2003	World Championships	Paris, France	15th (q)	Shot put	17.83 m
2004	Olympic Games	Athens, Greece	14th (q)	Shot put	17.89 m

Awards
Preceded by Katja Seizinger	German Sportswoman of the Year; 1997	Succeeded by Katja Seizinger
Preceded by Svetlana Masterkova	Women's European Athlete of the Year; 1997	Succeeded by Christine Arron
