= Irini Terzoglou =

Greek shot putter

Iríni Terzóglou (Greek: Ειρήνη Τερζόγλου, born February 2, 1979, in Serres, Kentriki Makedonia) is a Greek shot putter. Her personal best put is 19.10 metres, achieved in June 2003 in Trikala. This is the current Greek record.

== Achievements ==
Year	Competition	Venue	Position	Notes
Representing Greece
1998	World Junior Championships	Annecy, France	16th (q)	14.27 m
2001	European U23 Championships	Amsterdam, Netherlands	4th	16.87 m
2001	Universiade	Beijing, China	14th	15.55 m
2001	Mediterranean Games	Radès, Tunisia	2nd	16.97 m
2003	World Championships	Paris, France	12th	17.88 m
2004	World Indoor Championships	Budapest, Hungary	17th (q)	17.04 m
2004	Olympic Games	Athens, Greece	18th (q)	17.34 m
2006	World Cup	Athens, Greece	9th	16.32 m
2008	Olympic Games	Beijing, China	26th (q)	16.50 m
2009	Mediterranean Games	Pescara, Italy	4th	16.94 m
