= Nataša Erjavec =

Slovenian shot putter

Personal information
- Born: 15 May 1968 (age 58) Ljubljana, Yugoslavia

Sport
- Sport: Track and field
Medal record
Representing Slovenia
Mediterranean Games
Silver medal – second place	1993 Narbonne	Shot put

Nataša Erjavec (born 15 May 1968) is a retired Slovenian athlete who specialised in the shot put. She represented her country at one indoor and two outdoor World Championships. In addition, she won the silver at the 1993 Mediterranean Games.

Her personal bests in the event are 18.10 metres outdoors (Nova Gorica 1994) and 17.97 metres indoors (Ljubljana 1996). Both are standing national records.

== Competition record ==
Year	Competition	Venue	Position	Event	Notes
Representing Slovenia
1993	Mediterranean Games	Narbonne, France	2nd	Shot put	16.88 m
1993	World Championships	Stuttgart, Germany	24th (q)	Shot put	15.71 m
1994	European Championships	Helsinki, Finland	12th	Shot put	16.34 m
1995	World Indoor Championships	Barcelona, Spain	9th	Shot put	17.41 m
1995	Universiade	Fukuoka, Japan	5th	Shot put	16.90 m
1995	World Championships	Gothenburg, Sweden	15th (q)	Shot put	16.91 m
1997	Mediterranean Games	Bari, Italy	7th	Shot put	16.94 m
1998	European Championships	Budapest, Hungary	17th (q)	Shot put	16.43 m
