= Valentina Fedyushina =

Austrian shot putter

Personal information
- Born: 10 February 1965 (age 61) Moscow, Soviet Union

Sport
- Sport: Track and field
Medal record
Representing Soviet Union
European Junior Championships
Silver medal – second place	1983 Schwechat	Shot put
Representing Ukraine
European Indoor Championships
Bronze medal – third place	1996 Stockholm	Shot put

Valentina Fedjuschina (born 10 February 1965 in Moscow) is a retired Austrian shot putter.

She originally competed for Soviet Union and Ukraine, but became an Austrian citizen in 1999 to compete in the Sydney Olympic games for this country. She is married to discus thrower Volodymyr Zinchenko.

Her personal best put is 21.08 metres, achieved in May 1988 in Leselidze. She holds the 3rd best ever indoor performance with 21.60 meters, in Simferopol.

As an Austrian citizen she has set a national record for that country with 19.21 metres in July 1999 in Casablanca.

== International competitions ==
Year	Competition	Venue	Position	Notes
Representing the Soviet Union
1983	European Junior Championships	Schwechat, Austria	2nd	17.01 m
1988	Olympic Games	Seoul, South Korea	13th	19.06 m
Representing Unified Team
1992	European Indoor Championships	Genoa, Italy	4th	18.95 m
Representing Ukraine
1993	World Indoor Championships	Toronto, Canada	4th	19.07 m
1993	World Championships	Stuttgart, Germany	7th	19.27 m
1994	European Indoor Championships	Paris, France	—	NM
1994	European Championships	Helsinki, Finland	7th	18.91 m
1995	World Indoor Championships	Barcelona, Spain	6th	18.48 m
1995	World Championships	Gothenburg, Sweden	10th	18.03 m
1996	European Indoor Championships	Stockholm, Sweden	3rd	18.90 m
1996	Olympic Games	Atlanta, United States	12th	17.99 m
1997	World Championships	Athens, Greece	20th	17.31 m
Representing Austria
1999	World Championships	Seville, Spain	7th	18.17 m
2000	Olympic Games	Sydney, Australia	12th	17.14 m
2002	European Indoor Championships	Vienna, Austria	4th	18.23 m
2002	European Championships	Munich, Germany	13th	17.11 m
