= Grit Hammer =

German shot putter

Grit Hammer, née Haupt (born 4 June 1966 in Saalfeld, Bezirk Gera) is a retired German shot putter.

She represented the sports club SC Motor Jena, and won the silver medal at the East German championships in 1987. She put the shot 20.72 metres in June 1987 in Neubrandenburg.

== International competitions ==
Year	Competition	Venue	Position	Notes
1990	European Indoor Championships	Glasgow, United Kingdom	3rd	
1992	European Indoor Championships	Genoa, Italy	7th	
1994	European Indoor Championships	Paris, France	5th	
1995	World Indoor Championships	Barcelona, Spain	3rd	
