= Valeyta Althouse =

American shot putter

Personal information
- Born: January 7, 1974 (age 52) Moberly, Missouri, U.S.

Sport
- Sport: Athletics
- Event: Shot put

Valeyta Roi Althouse (born January 7, 1974) is an American former athlete. She competed in the women's shot put at the 1996 Summer Olympics.

Competing for the UCLA Bruins track and field team, Althouse won the 1995 NCAA Division I Outdoor Track and Field Championships in the shot put.
