= Sui Xinmei =

Chinese shot putter (born 1965)

Personal information
- Born: January 29, 1965 (age 61) Zhaoyuan, Shandong, China

Sport
- Sport: Track and field
Medal record
Representing China
Olympic Games
Silver medal – second place	1996 Atlanta	Shot put
World Indoor Championships
Gold medal – first place	1991 Sevilla	Shot put
Asian Championships
Gold medal – first place	1995 Jakarta	Shot put
Silver medal – second place	1989 New Delhi	Shot put
Asian Games
Gold medal – first place	1990 Beijing	Shot put
Gold medal – first place	1994 Hiroshima	Shot put
Summer Universiade
Gold medal – first place	1991 Sheffield	Shot put

Sui Xinmei (隋新梅, born January 29, 1965) is a Chinese shot putter who won the silver medal at the 1996 Summer Olympics in Atlanta.

She also won the 1991 IAAF World Indoor Championships as well as the Asian Games in 1990 and 1994 and the Asian Championships in 1995. She won silver medals at the 1998 Asian Championships and the 1997 East Asian Games.

Her personal best of 21.66 m, thrown in Beijing in 1990, ranks her 10th on the shot put all-time lists.

== International competitions ==
Year	Competition	Venue	Position	Notes
Representing China
1995	World Championships	Gothenburg, Sweden	5th	19.09 m

== See also ==
- List of sportspeople sanctioned for doping offences
