= Connie Price-Smith =

American athlete (born 1962)

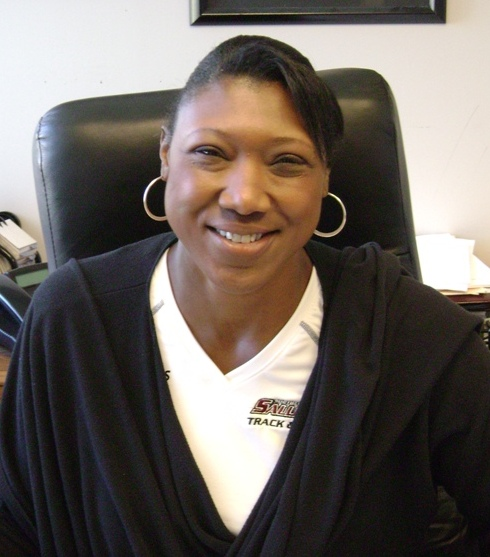
- Coach Connie Price-Smith of University of Mississippi

Personal information
- Born: Constance Marie Price; June 3, 1962 (age 64) St. Charles, Missouri, U.S.
- Education: Southern Illinois University
- Height: 6 ft 3.5 in (192 cm)
- Weight: 209 lb (95 kg)
- Spouse: John Smith (m. 1990)

Sport
- Sport: Athletics (track and field)
- Events: Shot put, Discus throw
- College team: Southern Illinois University-Carbondale

Achievements and titles
- Personal bests: Shot Put: 64 ft 3 in (19.58 m); Discus: 212 ft 8 in (64.82 m)

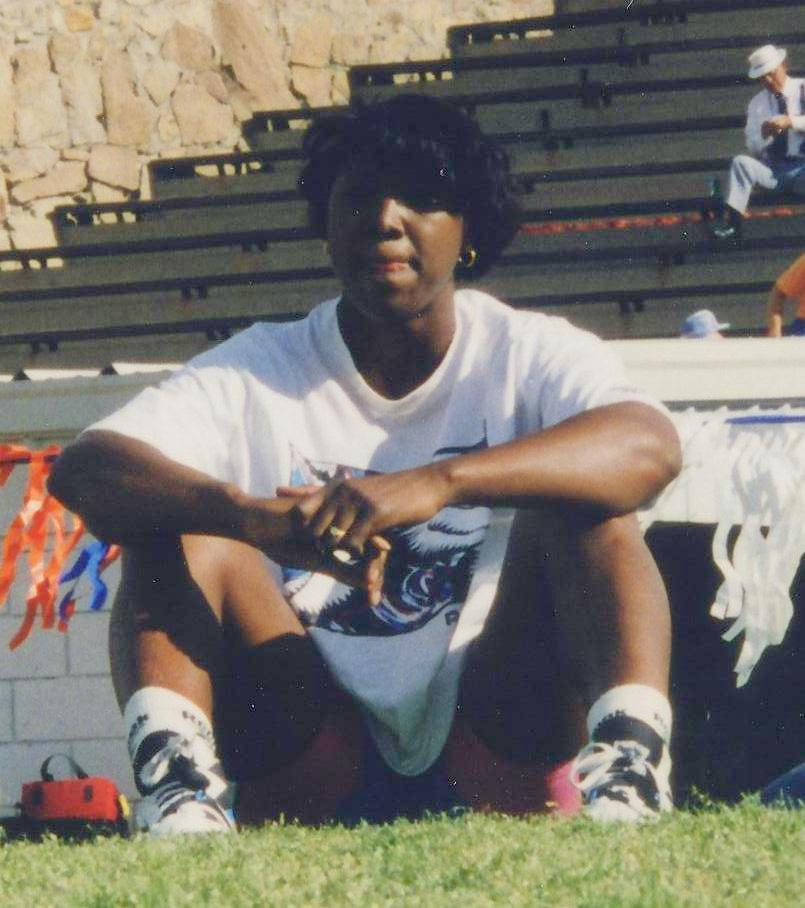
Price-Smith in 1994

Connie Price-Smith (born Constance Marie Price, June 3, 1962) is an American shot putter and discus thrower. Price-Smith is also a four-time Olympian. She graduated from Southern Illinois University-Carbondale in 1985.

== Later career ==
Price-Smith was also named to the 2012 Olympic track & field team coach staff in London. On July 21, 2015, she started her tenure as the head coach at the University of Mississippi. She was named women's head coach for the United States team at the 2016 Summer Olympics, again in Rio de Janeiro.

In 2016, she was elected into the National Track and Field Hall of Fame.

== International competitions ==
Year	Competition	Venue	Position	Notes
Representing the United States
1987	Pan American Games	Indianapolis, United States	3rd	Discus
1987	World Championships	Rome, Italy	NM^	Discus
1988	Olympic Games	Seoul, South Korea	16th (q)	Discus
1988	Olympic Games	Seoul, South Korea	18th (q)	Shot put
1989	World Indoor Championships	Budapest, Hungary	10th	Shot put
1989	IAAF World Cup	Barcelona, Spain	7th	Discus
1991	World Indoor Championships	Seville, Spain	7th	Shot put
1991	World Championships	Tokyo, Japan	11th	Shot put
1991	Pan American Games	Havana, Cuba	2nd	Shot put
1992	Olympic Games	Barcelona, Spain	20th (q)	Discus
1992	IAAF World Cup	Havana, Cuba	4th	Shot put
1992	IAAF World Cup	Havana, Cuba	7th	Discus
1993	World Indoor Championships	Toronto, Canada	9th	Shot put
1994	World Cup	London, United Kingdom	8th	Discus
1995	World Indoor Championships	Barcelona, Spain	2nd	Shot put
1995	World Championships	Gothenburg, Sweden	9th	Shot put
1995	Pan American Games	Mar del Plata, Argentina	1st	Shot put
1996	Olympic Games	Atlanta, United States	5th	Shot put
1997	World Indoor Championships	Paris, France	6th	Shot put
1997	World Championships	Athens, Greece	5th	Shot put
1998	IAAF World Cup	Johannesburg, South Africa	3rd	Shot put
1998	Goodwill Games	Uniondale, United States	2nd	Shot put
1999	World Indoor Championships	Maebashi, Japan	4th	Shot put
1999	World Championships	Seville, Spain	11th	Shot put
1999	Pan American Games	Winnipeg, Canada	1st	Shot put
2000	Olympic Games	Sydney, Australia	16th (q)	Shot put
2001	World Indoor Championships	Lisbon, Portugal	10th	Shot put

- ^ Reached the 1987 World Championship Final at discus but failed to register a distance.
- Note: Results with a Q, indicate overall position in qualifying round.
