= List of doping cases in athletics =

Overview of doping in athletics

The use of performance-enhancing drugs (doping in sport) is prohibited within the sport of athletics. Athletes who are found to have used such banned substances, whether through a positive drugs test, the biological passport system, an investigation or public admission, may receive a competition ban for a length of time which reflects the severity of the infraction. Athletes who are found to have banned substances in their possession, or who tamper with or refuse to submit to drug testing can also receive bans from the sport. Competitive bans may also be given to athletes who test positive for prohibited recreational drugs or stimulants with little performance-enhancing effect for competitors in athletics. The sports body responsible for determining which substances are banned in athletics is the World Anti-Doping Agency (WADA).

Typically, any athlete who tests positive for banned substances after having served a previous ban receives a lifetime ban from the sport of athletics. Many high-profile sportspeople to receive doping bans have come from the sport of athletics, with significant past cases concerning Ben Johnson, Marion Jones and Tim Montgomery. Furthermore, a number of athletes who underwent state-sponsored doping programmes in East Germany and the Soviet Union between the 1950s and 1980s were competitors in athletics, but the quality of the international anti-doping work was so poor that only one East German athlete ever tested positive. Following allegations of state-sponsored doping in Russia, the IAAF suspended the country's athletes from competition, including the 2016 Summer Olympics.

Name	Country	Event	Date of violation	Banned substance(s)/ Anti-doping rule violation	Sanction	Reference(s)
Ahmed Abd El Raouf	Egypt	Hammer throw	2008	Norandrosterone	2 years	
Inga Abitova	Russia	Long distance	2009	Biological passport anomalies	2 years	
Folashade Abugan	Nigeria	Sprinting	2010	Testosterone prohormone	2 years	
Ibrahim Mohamed Aden	Somalia	Middle distance	1999	Ephedrine	Public warning	
Tosin Adeloye	Nigeria	Sprinting	2012; 2015	Metenolone; Exogenous steroids	2 years 8 years	
Susan Olufunke Adeoye	Nigeria	Hammer throw	2007	Ephedrine	Public warning	
Alessandra Aguilar	Spain	Long distance	2011		3 months	
Amina Aït Hammou	Morocco	Middle distance	2008	3 whereabouts failures	1 year	
Seltana Aït Hammou	Morocco	Middle distance	2008	3 whereabouts failures	1 year	
Chioma Ajunwa	Nigeria	Long jump, sprinting	1992		4 years	
Esther Akinsulie	Canada	Sprinting	2013	Hydrochlorothiazide	6 months	
Ashwini Akkunji	India	Sprinting	2011	Anabolic steroids	2 years	
Mary Akor Basley	United States	Marathon	2012	Clenbuterol	2 years	
Mikko Ala-Leppilampi	Finland	Long distance	1972	Self admittance of blood transfusions (not illegal at the time)	—	
Mariem Alaoui Selsouli	Morocco	Middle distance	2009; 2012	EPO; Furosemide	2 years 8 years	
Sultan Al-Dawoodi	Saudi Arabia	Discus throw	2009	Norandrosterone	2 years	
Denis Alekseyev	Russia	Sprinting	2013	Dehydrochloromethyltestosterone	2 years	
Barakat Al-Harthi	Oman	Sprinting	2011	Methylprednisolone	6 months	
Ghfran Almouhamad	Syria	Hurdling	2012	Methylhexaneamine	6 months	
Anna Alminova	Russia	Middle distance	2010; 2009	Pseudoephedrine; Biological passport anomalies	3 months 30 months	
Anthony Alozie	Australia	Sprinting	2013	3 Whereabouts Failures	20 months	
Aslı Çakır Alptekin	Turkey	Middle distance/steeplechase	2004; 2010	Metenolone; Biological passport	2 years 8 years	
Chinaza Amadi	Nigeria	Long jump	2015	Metenolone	4 years	
Gloria Amuche Nwosu	Nigeria	Sprinting	2005	Testosterone	2 years	
Anis Ananenka	Belarus	Middle distance	2015	GW1516	4 years	
Andreas Anastasopoulos	Greece	Shot put	2001		2 years	
Georg Andersen	Norway	Shot put	1991	Metenolone	21 months	
Marvin Anderson	Jamaica	Sprinting	2009	4-Methyl-2-hexanamine	3 months	
Lyudmila Andonova	Bulgaria	High jump	1985	Amphetamine	18 months	
Yeorgios Andreou	Cyprus	Decathlon	2003		2 years	
Vladimir Andreyev	Russia	Race walking	2005	Salbutamol	1 year	
Yuriy Andronov	Russia	Race walking	2014	Trimetazidine	2 years	
Ivanildo dos Anjos	Brazil	Long distance	2014	Hydrochlorothiazide	18 months	
Adrián Annus	Hungary	Hammer throw	2004	Missed test, tampering	2 years	
Seema Antil	India	Discus throw	2000	Pseudoephedrine	Public warning	
Elena Antoci	Romania	Middle distance	2008	EPO		
Olena Antonova	Ukraine	Discus throw	2009 (Retested 2013)	Stanozolol	2 years	
Esref Apak	Turkey	Hammer throw	2013	Stanozolol	2 years	
Thozama April	South Africa	Long distance	2014	Phentermine, Prednisolone, Norandrosterone	2 years	
Demetra Arachoviti	Greece	Hurdling	2012	Stanozolol	2 years	
Geisa Arcanjo	Brazil	Shot put	2010	Hydrochlorothiazide	Public warning	
Juana Arrendel	Dominican Republic	High jump	1999	Stanozolol		
Katsiaryna Artsiukh	Belarus	Hurdling	2010	Metenolone	2 years	
Natalya Artyomova	Russia	Middle distance		Steroids		
Tatiana Aryasova	Russia	Long distance	2012	Hydroxyethylstarch	2 years	
Elena Arzhakova	Russia	Middle distance	2011	Biological passport violation	2 years	
Malika Asahssah	Morocco	Long distance	2015	Stanozolol	4 years	
Delilah Asiago	Kenya	Long distance	1999			
Innocent Asonze	Nigeria	Sprinting	1999			
Wayne Athorne	Australia	Decathlon		Methandienone (Dianabol)		
Duncan Atwood	United States	Javelin throw	1985	Stimulant	Life ban (later reduced)	
Olutoyin Augustus (Toyin Augustus)	Nigeria	Hurdles	2009	Abnormal testosterone levels	2 years	
Anna Avdeyeva	Russia	Shot put	2013	Oral Turinabol (anabolic steroid)	2 years	
Roman Avramenko	Ukraine	Javelin throw	2013; 2015	Dehydrochloromethyltestosterone; Dehydrochloromethyltestosterone	2 years 8 years	
Hussein Awada	Lebanon	Cross country running Half marathon	2012	Nandrolone	2 years	
Mark Anthony Awere	Ghana	Long jump	2001		3 months	
Bimbo Miel Ayedou	Benin	Sprinting	2012	Nandrolone	2 years	
Süreyya Ayhan	Turkey	Middle distance	2004; 2007	Interfering with test Stanozolol, Methandienone	2 years Life ban	
Masoud Azizi	Afghanistan	Sprinting	2013	Nandrolone	2 years	
Ahmed Baday	Morocco	Long distance	2010	Biological passport anomalies	2 years	
Ndiss Kaba Badji	Senegal	Long jump, triple jump	2005	Androstenedione	2 years	
Oleksandr Bagach	Soviet Union; Ukraine	Shot put	1989; 1997	Steroids; Ephedrine	2 years Public warning and disqualification	(in German)
José Alessandro Bagio	Brazil	Race walking	2010	19-Norandrosterone	2 years	
Amina Bakhit	Sudan	Middle distance	2009	Norandrosterone	2 years	
Sergey Bakulin	Russia	Race walking	2011	Biological passport anomalies	3 years and 2 months	
Živilė Balčiūnaitė	Lithuania	Long distance	2010	Testosterone	2 years	
Michal Balner	Czech Republic	Pole vault	2010	Cannabis	1 month	
Onalenna Baloyi	Botswana	Middle distance	2010	Methylhexanamine	2 years	
Yuliya Balykina	Belarus	Sprinting	2013	Drostanolone	2 years	
Falk Balzer	Germany	Hurdling	2001	Nandrolone	2 years	
Konstadinos Baniotis	Greece	High jump	2013	Furosemide	Public warning	
Jarrod Bannister	Australia	Javelin throw	2012	3 Whereabouts Failures within an 18-month period	20 months	
Kelly-Ann Baptiste	Trinidad and Tobago	Sprinting			2 years	
Shawnacy Barber	Canada	Pole vault	2016	Cocaine	Public warning	
Roberto Barbi	Italy	Marathon	1996; 2001; 2008	Ephedrine; EPO; EPO, Ephedrine	3 months 4 years, reduced to 25 months Life ban	
Roxana Bârcă	Romania	Long distance running	2013	Methasterone	2 years	
Randy Barnes	United States	Shot put	1990; 1998	Methyltestosterone; Androstenedione	27 months Life ban	
Yarelys Barrios	Cuba	Discus throw	2008	Acetazolamide		
Bruno de Barros	Brazil	Sprinting	2009	EPO	2 years	
Elias Bastos	Brazil	Cross country running	2014	Methyltestosterone	2 years	
Giuliano Battocletti	Italy	Long distance running	1999	Nandrolone	16 months	
Dieter Baumann	Germany	Long distance	1999	Nandrolone	2 years	
Julie Baumann	Canada	Hurdling	1989	Stanozolol	2 years	
Vadim Bavikin	Israel	Javelin throw	1994	Steroids	4 years	
Chantal Beaugeant	France	Heptathlon	1989		2 years	
James Beckford	Jamaica	Long jump	1997	Ephedrine	3 months	
Violeta Beclea	Romania	Middle distance	1995	Steroids	4 years	
Chaltu Beji	Azerbaijan	Steeplechase	2015	Ostarine	4 years	
Alemitu Bekele	Turkey	Long distance	2009	Biological passport anomalies	2 years and 9 months	
Mimi Belete	Bahrain	Middle/Long distance	2010	Salbutamol	Public reprimand and disqualification	
Irina Belova	Russia	Heptathlon	1993	Testosterone	4 years	
Kenta Bell	United States	Triple jump	2007	Methylprednisolone	3 months	
Awatef Ben Hassine	Tunisia	Sprinting	2004	Norandrosterone	2 years	
Yassine Bensghir	Morocco	Middle distance	2014	Biological passport	4 years	
Yahya Berrabah	Morocco	Long jump	2009; 2011	Cannabis; EPO	Public warning 4 years (2nd ADRV)	
Gwen Berry	United States	Hammer throw	2016	Use of a prohibited substance (Vilanterol Trifenatate)	3 months	
Michael Berry	United States	Sprinting	2010	Cannabis	3 months	
Mariya Bespalova	Russia	Hammer throw	2015	Dehydrochloromethyltestosterone	4 years	
María Cristina Betancourt	Cuba	Discus throw	1983		Life ban	
Kipyegon Bett	Kenya	800 m	2017	Erythropoietin out-of-competition test in November 2017	4 years	
Antonella Bevilacqua	Italy	High jump	1996	Ephedrine, pseudoephedrine		
Uwe Beyer	West Germany	Hammer throw	1960's/1970's	Anabolic steroids (self-admitted)	—	(in German)
Alemayehu Bezabeh	Spain	Middle/Long distance	2010	Use of a prohibited method (Operation Galgo)	2 years	
Rajendra Bahadur Bhandari	Nepal	Long distance	2006	Norandrosterone	2 years	
Quentin Bigot	France	Hammer throw	2014	Methandienone and Stanozolol	2 years	
Madina Biktagirova	Unified Team	Long distance	1992	Norephedrine		
Yuriy Bilonoh	Ukraine	Shot put	2004 (Sample retested 2012)	Oxandrolone	3 years	
Svetlana Biryukova	Russia	Long jump	2014	SARMs	2-year ban	
Dominique Blake	Jamaica	Sprinting	2006; 2012	Ephedrine; Methylhexanamine	9 months 4 years and 6 months (Reduced from 6 years)	
Yohan Blake	Jamaica	Sprinting	2009	4-Methyl-2-hexanamine	3 months	
José Luis Blanco	Spain	Middle distance	2010	EPO	2 years	
Zhanna Block	Ukraine	Sprinting	2002	BALCO scandal	2 years	
Lyudmyla Blonska	Ukraine	Heptathlon, long jump	2003; 2008	Stanozolol; Methyltestosterone	2 years Life ban	
Petr Bogatyrev	Russia	Race walking	2011	Biological passport anomalies	2 years	
Ato Boldon	Trinidad and Tobago	Sprinting	2001	Ephedrine	Public warning	
Scott Boothby	United States	Hammer throw	2006	Finasteride, 6-oxo-androstenedione	4 years (Reduced from 8 years)	
Valeriy Borchin	Russia	Race walking	2005; 2009	Ephedrine; Biological passport anomalies	1 year 8 years	
Béranger-Aymard Bossé	Central African Republic	Sprinting	2016	Prednisolone	2 years	
Mihaela Botezan	Romania	Long distance	2007	Chlortalidone	2 years	
Chakir Boujattaoui	Morocco	Long-distance	2010	MIRCERA	2 years	
Brahim Boulami	Morocco	Steeplechace	2002	EPO	2 years	
Larbi Bouraada	Algeria	Decathlon	2012	Stanozolol	2 years	
Abderrahime Bouramdane	Morocco	Marathon	2011	Biological passport	2 years	
Zahra Bouras	Algeria	Middle-distance	2012	Stanozolol	2 years	
Sofiya Bozhanova	Bulgaria	Long/Triple jump	1994	Amphetamine	4 years	
Marvin Bracy	United States	Sprinting	2025	Testosterone	45 months	
Kevin Braunskill	United States	Sprinting	1994	Stanozolol	4 years	
Grit Breuer	Germany	Sprinting	1992	Clenbuterol	2 years	
Okkert Brits	South Africa	Pole vault	2003	Ephedrine	Public warning	
Damien Broothaerts	Belgium	Hurdling	2011	Methylhexanamine, 3 whereabouts failures	1 year (Reduced from 2 years)	
Alicia Brown	Canada	Sprinting	2013	Hydrochlorothiazide	2 years	
Erik de Bruin	Netherlands	Discus throw, shot put	1993	Testosterone, Stanozolol, hCG	4 years	
Ricky Bruch	Sweden	Discus throw	1960's/1970's	Anabolic steroids (self-admitted)	—	(in Swedish)
Yelyzaveta Bryzhina	Ukraine	Sprinting	2013	Drostanolone	2 years	
Aleksandr Bulanov	Russia	Shot put	2009	Methandienone	2 years	
Viktor Burayev	Russia	Race walking	2008	EPO	2 years	
Tamara Bykova	Soviet Union	High jump	1990	Ephedrine	3 months	
Yolanda Caballero	Colombia	Long distance	2011; 2014	Biological passport Tampering	4 years	
Gary Cadogan	Great Britain	Sprinting, hurdling	1998	Nandrolone	2 years	
Dorina Calenic	Romania	Long distance	1987			
Mehmet Çağlayan	Turkey	Long distance	2010	EPO	2 years	
Jillian Camarena-Williams	United States	Shot put	2013	Clomiphene	6 months	
John Capel	United States	Sprinting	2004; 2006	Cannabis; Cannabis	Public warning 2 years	
Dean Capobianco	Australia	Sprinting	1996	Stanazolol	2 years (Reduced from 4 years)	
Hector Carrasquillo	Puerto Rico	Sprinting	2011	Anabolic steroid	2 years	
LaMark Carter	United States	Triple jump	2004	Salbutamol	Public warning	
Silviu Casandra	Romania	Race walking	2002		2 years	
Arnaud Casquette	Mauritius	Long jump	2005	Cannabis	6 months	
Víctor Castillo	Venezuela	Long jump	2006; 2011	Furosemide; Methylhexaneamine	2 years 4 years	
Recep Çelik	Turkey	Race walking	2012	Metenolone	2 years	
Jolanda Čeplak	Slovenia	Middle distance	2007	EPO	2 years	
Dwain Chambers	Great Britain	Sprinting	2003	THG, Testosterone, EPO, HGH, Insulin, Modafinil & Liothyronine	2 years	
Hafid Chani	Morocco	Long distance	2011	Biological passport	4 years	
Jamel Chatbi	Morocco	Steeplechase	2009	Clenbuterol	3 years	
Jani Chathurangani Silva	Sri Lanka	Sprinting	2006	Nandrolone	2 years	
David Chaussinand	France	Hammer throw	23 May 2002; 24 June 2002	Metenolone; Clenbuterol	3 years	
Mouhcine Cheaouri	Morocco	Pole vault	2016	Stanozolol	4 years	
Emily Chebet	Kenya	Long distance, cross country	2015	Furosemide	4 years	
Cristiana Checchi	Italy	Shot put	2003	Caffeine	Public warning	
Viktor Chegin	Russia	Coach		Administration of a prohibited substance, complicity	Life ban	
Abdelatif Chemlal	Morocco	Steeplechase	2004	Norandrosterone	2 years	
Flomena Chepchirchir	Kenya	Marathon	2014		6 months	
Pamela Chepchumba	Kenya	Cross country running	2003	EPO	2 years	
Susan Chepkemei	Kenya	Long distance	2007	Salbutamol	1 year	
Svetlana Cherkasova	Russia	Middle distance	2007	Fraudulent substitution of urine	33 months	
Lada Chernova	Russia	Javelin throw	2008; 2013	Metenolone; Bromantane	2 years Life ban	
Tatyana Chernova	Russia	Heptathlon	2009	Oral Turinabol	2 years	
Lydia Cheromei	Kenya	Long distance	2005	Clomiphene	2 years	
Damu Cherry	United States	Hurdling	2003	Norandrosterone	2 years	
Silvano Chesani	Italy	High jump	2007	Formoterol	Public warning	
Christophe Cheval	France	Sprinting	2001	Nandrolone	2 years	
Dimitrios Chondrokoukis	Greece	High jump	2012	Stanozolol	2 years	
Fouad Chouki	France	Middle distance	2003	EPO	2 years	
Khalid Choukoud	Netherlands	Long distance	2007	Stanozolol	2 years	
Linford Christie	Great Britain	Sprinting	1999	Nandrolone	2 years	
Vivian Chukwuemeka	Nigeria	Shot put and discus	2009; 2012	Oxymetholone; Stanozolol	2 years Life ban	
Clement Chukwu	Nigeria	Sprinting	1992		4 years	
Yelena Churakova	Russia	Hurdling	2013	Methandienone & Dehydrochloromethyltestosterone	2 years	
Hazel Clark	United States	Middle distance	2001	Pseudoephedrine	Public warning	
Venolyn Clarke	Canada	Sprinting	2001	Stanozolol	4 years	
Ramon Clay	United States	Sprinting	2000–2004	Steroids and hormones (BALCO scandal)	2 years	
Luis Collazo	Puerto Rico	Long distance	2011	Exogenous steroids	2 years	
Michelle Collins	United States	Sprinting	2002–2004	THG, EPO (BALCO scandal)	4 years (Reduced from 8 years)	
Rosa Colorado	Spain	Hurdling	1980	Steroids	18 months	
Hannah Cooper	Liberia	Sprinting	1999			
Harold Connolly	United States	Hammer throw	1960's	Self-admitted; Anabolic steroids	–	
Jessica Cosby	United States	Hammer throw	2009	Hydrochlorothiazide, chlorothiazide	4 month	
Nuno Costa	Portugal	Cross country running	2011	EPO	2 years	
Daniela Costian	Romania	Discus throw	1986			.
Julie Coulaud	France	Middle/Long distance	2008	Testosterone	3 years	
Crystal Cox	United States	Sprinting	2002; 2001–2004	Ephedrine (positive test); Anabolic steroids (self admitted)	Public warning 4-year ban	
Shawn Crawford	United States	Sprinting	2012	3 whereabouts failures	2 years	
Olga Cristea	Moldova	Middle-distance	2010	Testosterone	2 years	
Peter Dajia	Canada	Shot put	1983– 1986	Self admittance in 1989: Steroids; Positive test: Steroids, Testosterone	18 months	
Martina Danišová-Hrasnová	Slovakia	Hammer throw	2003	Nandrolone	2 years	
Bonnie Dasse	United States	Shot put	1992	Clenbuterol	4 years	
Marie Davenport (Marie McMahon)	Ireland	Long distance	1996	Phenylpropanolamine	Reprimand	
Walter Davis	United States	Triple jump	2013	3 whereabouts failures	1 year	
Alice Decaux	France	Hurdling	2013	β-Methylphenethylamine	6 months	
Mary Decker (Mary Slaney)	United States	Middle distance	1996	Testosterone		
Tony Dees	United States	Hurdling	2001	Norandrosterone, Noretiochdandone	Life ban	
Hind Dehiba	France	Middle distance	2007	EPO	2 years	
Tatyana Dektyareva	Russia	Hurdling	2014	Ostarine	2 years	
Dimitrios Delifotis	Greece	Long jump	1984			
Luis Delís	Cuba	Discus throw/shot put	1990			
Tezeta Dengersa	Turkey	Middle/Long distance	2005	Metenolone	2 years	
Frédéric Denis	France	Steeplechase	2007	EPO	2 years	
Sébastien Denis	France	Hurdling	2005	Ephedrine	Public warning	
Lyubov Denisova	Russia	Marathon	2007	Prostanozol, testosterone	2 years	
Manuela Derr	Germany	Sprinting	1992	Clenbuterol	3 years	
Ronald Desruelles	Belgium	Long jump	1980			
Hrysopiyi Devetzi	Greece	Triple/Long jump	2009; 2007 (Retest 2015)	Failure to submit to doping control Stanozolol	2 years 4 years	
Vadim Devyatovskiy	Belarus	Hammer throw	2000	Nandrolone	2 years	
Aïssa Dghoughi	Morocco	Long distance	2006	Refusal to submit to doping control	3 years	
Ahmed Mohamed Dheeb	Qatar	Discus throw	2010	Testosterone metabolites		
Alberico Di Cecco	Italy	Marathon	2008	EPO	2 years	
Rostislav Dimitrov	Bulgaria	Triple jump	1999	Ephedrine		
Svetla Dimitrova	Bulgaria	Heptathlon	1989	Sydnocarb	2 years	
Katalin Divós	Hungary	Hammer throw	2001		2 years	
Vukosava Đjapić	Serbia and Montenegro	Sprinting	2005	Metenolone	2 years	
Abderahmane Djemadi	Algeria	Long distance	2001	Refusal to submit to doping control	2 years	
Gábor Dobos	Hungary	Sprinting	2000; 2006	Drostanolone, testosterone	2 years Life ban	
Jim Doehring	United States	Shot put	1990	Steroids	2 years	
Bahar Doğan	Turkey	Long distance	2011	Biological passport	2 years and 6 months	
Bishop Dolegiewicz	Canada	Shot put, discus throw	1973–1985	Self admittance (The Dubin Inquiry): Steroids	National record annulled	
Marta Dominguez	Spain	Middle distance	2009	Biological passport	3 years	
Tetyana Dorovskikh (Tatyana Samolenko)	Ukraine	Middle distance	1993	Unknown substance		
Rashid Shafi Al-Dosari	Qatar	Discus throw	2003	Refused to submit to doping control	2 years	
Troy Douglas	Netherlands	Sprinting	1999	Nandrolone	2 years	
Horace Dove-Edwin	Sierra Leone	Sprinting	1994	Stanozolol	2 years	
Hanna Drabenia	Belarus	Race walking	2015	Trimetazidine	2 years	
Rasa Drazdauskaitė	Lithuania	Long distance	2003	Stanozolol	2 years	
Heike Drechsler	East Germany	Long jump/sprinting	1980's	Self admittance	—	
Hamza Driouch	Qatar	Middle distance	2012	Biological passport anomalies	2 years	
Jon Drummond	United States	Coach	2012/ 2013	Possession, trafficking and administration of prohibited substances	8 years	
Oleksandr Dryhol	Ukraine	Hammer throw	2013	Dehydrochloromethyltestosterone	2 years	
Aliona Dubitskaya	Belarus	Shot put	2014	Oxilofrine	6 months	
Aleksandra Duliba	Belarus	Marathon	2013	Biological passport	2 years	
Corina Dumbrăvean	Romania	Middle distance	2007; 2010	Refusal to submit to testing	2 years Life ban	
Julien Dunkley	Jamaica	Sprinting	2008	Boldenone	2 years	
Debbie Dunn	United States	Sprinting	2012	Testosterone	2 years	
Lyudmila Dzhigalova	Ukraine	Sprinting	1993	Steroids	4 years	
Monzavous Edwards	United States	Sprinting	2004	Cannabis	Public warning	
Mark Edwards	Great Britain			Clostebol, Testosterone		
Paul Edwards	Great Britain	Shot put	1993; 1997	Anabolic steroids, raised testosterone and pseudoephedrine Tetrahydrocannabinol	4 years Life ban	
Torri Edwards	United States	Sprinting	2004	Nikethamide	15 months (Reduced from 2 years)	
Daniel Effiong	Nigeria	Sprinting	1995	Methyltestosterone and ephedrine	4 years	
Inna Eftimova	Bulgaria	Sprinting	2011 {Retested 2012)	Recombinant Human Growth hormone	2 years	
Florence Ekpo-Umoh	Germany	Sprinting	2003	Stanozolol	2 years	
Christy Ekpukhon	Nigeria	Sprinting	2008	Metenolone	2 years	
Abderrahim El Asri	Morocco	Cross country running	2014	EPO	2 years	
Wafa Ismail El Baghdadi	Egypt	Shot put	2007	Methandienone	2 years	
Hayat El Ghazi	Morocco	Hammer throw	2006	Norandrosterone	2 years	
Mohamed El Hachimi	Morocco	Long distance	2012; 2014	Methylhexaneamine; CERA	6 months 6 years	
Fouad Elkaam (Fouad El Kaam)	Morocco	Middle distance	2011	Methylhexaneamine	6 months	
Saïda El Mehdi	Morocco	Middle distance	2009	Stanozolol	2 years	
Rkia El Moukim	Morocco	Long distance	2011	Biological passport	2 years	
Najim El Qady	Morocco	Long distance	2011	Biological passport	2 years	
Stanislav Emelyanov	Russia	Race walking	2010	Biological passport	2 years	
Alene Emere	Ethiopia	Long distance	2002	Nandrolone	2 years	
Ivan Emilianov	Moldova	Shot put	2011	Metenolone, Stanozolol	2 years	
Meryem Erdogan	Turkey	Long distance	2010	Biological passport	2 years	
Mostafa Errebbah	Italy	Long distance	2004	Stanozolol	2 years	
Wilson Loyanae Erupe	Kenya	Long distance	2012	EPO	2 years	
Fatih Eryildirim	Turkey	Hammer throw	2013	Stanozolol, Dehydrochloromethyltestosterone	2 years and 6 months	
Nilay Esen	Turkey	Long distance	2005	Metenolone	2 years	
Alisher Eshbekov	Russia	Hammer throw		Anabolic steroid		
Ridouane Es-Saadi	Belgium	Middle/Long distance	2004; 2006	Trafficking, use, possession Methandienone	6 months Life ban	
Latifa Essarokh	France	Middle distance	2006	Stanozolol	2 years	
Lee Evans	United States	Coach	2013		4 years	
Davidson Ezinwa	Nigeria	Sprinting	1996; 1999	Ephedrine hCG	3 months 2 years	
Osmond Ezinwa	Nigeria	Sprinting	1996	Ephedrine	3 months	
Hamid Ezzine	Morocco	Steeplechase	2009	Refusal to submit to doping control, Tampering with test	2 years	
Martin Fagan	Ireland	Marathon, half-marathon	2011	EPO	2 years	
Ahmed Faiz	Saudi Arabia	Long jump	2010	Amphetamines	2 years	
Sandra Farmer-Patrick	United States	Hurdling	1996	Testosterone		
Róbert Fazekas	Hungary	Discus throw	2004; 2012	Failing to provide urine sample Stanozolol	2 years 6 years	
Surita Febbraio	South Africa	Hurdling	2005	Testosterone	2 years	
Agustín Félix	Spain	Decathlon	2011	Drostanolone	2 years	
Paquillo Fernández	Spain	Race walk	2010	Possession of undisclosed banned substances	2 years	
Ricardo Fernández	Spain	Middle/Long distance	2004; 2006	EPO; Finasteride	2 years 2 years	
Elena Fidatov	Romania	Middle/Long distance	1998	Nandrolone	2 years	
Nicolas Figère	France	Hammer throw	2007	Cathine	1 month, public warning	
Konstadinos Filippidis	Greece	Pole vault	2007	Etilephrine	2 years	
Yuliya Fomenko	Russia	Middle distance	2007	Fraudulent substitution of urine	33 months	
Greg Foster	United States	Hurdling	1990	Pseudoephedrine, Ephedrine, Phenylpropanolamine	6 months	
Allodin Fothergill	Jamaica	Sprinting	2009	4-Methyl-2-hexanamine	3 months	
Cecilia Francis	Nigeria	Sprinting	2013	Metenolone	1 year	
Shelly-Ann Fraser-Pryce	Jamaica	Sprinting	2010	Oxycodone	6 months	
Brian Frasure	United States	Sprinting	2000	Nandrolone	4 years	
Jake Freeman	United States	Hammer throw	2009; 2011	Cannabis; Cannabis	Public warning 1 year	
Margarita Fuentes-Pila	Spain	Middle distance	2015		6 months	
Ruth Fuchs	East Germany	Javelin throw	1970's	Anabolic steroids (self-admitted)	—	
Chryste Gaines	United States	Sprinting	2003; 2005	Modafinil (positive test); THG (investigation: BALCO)	Public warning 2 years	
Anton Galkin	Russia	Sprinting	2004	Stanozolol	2 years	
Miguel Ángel Gamonal	Spain	Half marathon	2013; 2015	Clenbuterol; Biological passport	2 years 3 years	
Alberto García	Spain	Long distance, cross country	2003	EPO	2 years	
Sandra Gasser	Switzerland	Middle distance	1987	Steroids	2 years	
Justin Gatlin	United States	Sprinting	2001; 2006	Amphetamine; Testosterone	1 year (Reduced from 2 years); 4 years	
Tyson Gay	United States	Sprinting	2013; 2012–2013	Positive test: Exogenous anabolic-androgenic steroid Investigation/Admittance	1 year	
Tibor Gécsek	Hungary	Hammer throw	1995	Anabolic steroids	2 years (Reduced from 4 years)	
Ines Geipel	East Germany	Sprinting	1980's	Turinabol (self-admitted)	—	
Shitaye Gemechu	Ethiopia	Long distance	2009	EPO	2 years	
Ivan Gertlein	Russia	Pole vault	2012	Testosterone	2 years	
Nordine Gezzar	France	Middle/Long distance	2006; 2012	Finasteride, nandrolone EPO	2 years 10 years	
Rachid Ghanmouni	Morocco	Long distance	2006	Evading doping control	2 years	
Ruqaya Al-Ghasra	Bahrain	Sprinting	2009	Epitestosterone	2 years	
Alina Gherasim (Alina Tecuţa)	Romania	Long distance	2002	Anabolic steroids	2 years	
Bouchra Ghezielle	France	Middle distance	2008	EPO	4 years	
Patricia Girard	France	Sprinting	1990	Primobolan (anabolic steroid)	2 years	(in Swedish)
Sandra Glover	United States	Sprinting	2003	Modafinil	Disqualification and public warning	
Geronimo Goeloe	Netherlands Antilles	Sprinting	2008	Stanozolol	2 years	
Thomas Goller	Germany	Hurdling	2010	Boldenone, SARMs	2 years	
Olga Golovkina	Russia	Long distance	2013	Dehydrochloromethyltestosterone	2 years	
Vanda Gomes	Brazil	Sprinting	2014	Anastrozole	2 years	
Yekaterina Gordiyenko	Soviet Union	Pentathlon	1978	Anabolic steroids	18 months	
Agnieszka Gortel-Maciuk	Poland	Marathon/Half marathon	2013	Testosterone, DHEA	2 years	
Anastasios Gousis	Greece	Sprinting	2008	Methyltrienolone	2 years	
Abderrahim Goumri	Morocco	Marathon	2009	Biological passport	4 years	
Eva-Maria Gradwohl	Austria	Long distance	2010	Refusal to submit to doping control	2 years	
Stephanie Graf	Austria	Middle distance	2003	Attempted use of a prohibited method (Humanplasma scandal)	2 years	
Trevor Graham	United States	Coach		Possession, trafficking, and administration of performance-enhancing drugs, and assisting, encouraging, aiding and abetting anti-doping rule violations	Life ban	
Mike Gravelle	United States	Discus throw	1995	Testosterone		
Rob Gray	Canada	Discus throw	1989 (Dubin Inquiry)	Self admittance: Anabolic steroids	National record annulled	
Bill Green	United States	Hammer throw	1987	Testosterone	2 years	
Yelizaveta Grechishnikova	Russia	Long distance	2009	Biological passport	2 years	
Anri Grigorov	Bulgaria	Sprinting	1990			
Lidiya Grigoryeva	Russia	Long distance	2009	Biological passport	2 years and 6 months	
Yekaterina Grigoryeva (Yekaterina Leshcheva)	Russia	Sprinting	2001		2 years	
Nataliya Grygoryeva	Soviet Union	Hurdling				
Mickey Grimes	United States	Sprinting	2003; 2004	Ephedrine; Norandrosterone	Public warning 2 years	
Yelena Gulyayeva	Russia	High jump	1991		2 years	
Anna Gurova	Russia	Sprinting	2011	Methyltestosterone	2 years	
Andreas Gustafsson	Sweden	Race walk	2014	EPO	2 years	
Abdelhadi Habassa	Morocco	Long distance	2008	Norandrosterone	2 years	
Milan Haborák	Slovakia	Shot put	2004; 2010	Hormones; Stanozolol	2 years Life ban	
Abdelkader Hachlaf	Morocco	Middle distance	2004	EPO	2 years	
Halima Hachlaf	Morocco	Long-distance	2013	Biological passport	4 years	
Mohamed El Hachimi	Morocco	Long distance	2014	CERA	6 years	
Semoy Hackett	Trinidad and Tobago	Sprinting	2011; 2012	Methylhexaneamine; Methylhexaneamine	6 months 2 years and 4 months	
Mohammad Noor Imran Abdul Hadi	Malaysia	Sprinting	2011	Evading doping control	2 years	
Vésteinn Hafsteinsson	Iceland	Discus throw	1984	Nandrolone	2 years	
Linda Haglund	Sweden	Sprinting	1981	Anabolic steroids	18 months	
Abdellah Haidane	Italy	Middle distance	2014	Tuaminoheptane	4 months	
Fatima Hajjami	France	Long distance	2003	Stanozolol	2 years	
Fani Halkia	Greece	Hurdling	2008	Methyltrienolone	2 years	
Hussain Al-Hamdah	Saudi Arabia	Long distance	2009	Biological passport	2 years and 6 months	
Tetyana Hamera-Shmyrko	Ukraine	Long distance	2011	Biological passport	4 years	
Tahesia Harrigan-Scott	British Virgin Islands	Sprinting	2011	Methylhexaneamine	6 months	
Alvin Harrison	United States	Sprinting	2004	BALCO scandal: Anabolic steroids, insulin, HgH, EPO, modafinil	4 years	
Calvin Harrison	United States	Sprinting	1993; 2003	Pseudoephedrine; Modafinil	3 months 2 years	
Ridouane Harroufi	Morocco	Long distance	2013	EPO	2 years	
Barakat Al-Harthi	Oman	Sprinting	2011	Methylprednisolone	6 months	
Kjell Ove Hauge	Norway	Discus throw, shot put	1998	Metandienone	18 months	(in Norwegian)
Ahmad Hazer	Lebanon	110 m hurdles	2013	Metenolone	2 years	
Floyd Heard	United States	Sprinting	2000		Public warning	
Sabine Heitling	Brazil	Steeplechase	2013	Methylhexaneamine	1 year	
Eddy Hellebuyck	United States	Long distance	2004	EPO	2 years	
Anca Heltne	Romania	Shot put	2010; 2014	Stanozolol; Methandienone, Dehydrochloromethyltestosterone	2 years 8 years	
Geraldine Hendricken	Ireland	Middle distance Cross country	2004	19-norandrosterone	2 years	
Adriënne Herzog	Netherlands	Long distance	2014	Testosterone	2 years	
Iván Hierro	Spain	Long distance	2014	Possession of a prohibited substance	2 years	
Claus Hirsbro	Denmark	Sprinting	1996; 2000	Stanozolol; Nandrolon	2 years Life ban	
Hassan Hirt	France	Long distance	2012	EPO	2 years	
Knut Hjeltnes	Norway	Discus throw, shot put	1977	Anabolic steroids	1 year	(in Norwegian)
Gergely Horváth	Hungary	Javelin throw	2006	Boldenone	2 years	
Hristoforos Hoidis	Greece	Sprinting	2005	Tamoxiphen	2 years	
Shelby Houlihan	United States	Middle/Long distance	2020	Nandrolone	4 years	
Seppo Hovinen	Finland	Javelin throw	1977	Anabolic steroids	1 year	
Sue Howland	Australia	Javelin throw	1987	Anabolic steroids	2 years	
Yu-Fang Hsu	Chinese Taipei	Marathon	2011	EPO	2 years	
Huang Qun	China	Discus throw	2006	Stanozolol	2 years	
C.J. Hunter	United States	Shot put	2000	Nandrolone	2 years	
Liza Hunter-Galvan	New Zealand	Marathon	2009	EPO	2 years	
Marwa Hussein	Egypt	Hammer throw	2010	Stanozolol	Two-year ban	
Victor Hogan	South Africa	Discus throw	2016	Methylhexanamine	9 month ban	
Monica Iagăr	Romania	High jump	1996		6 months	
Abdulagadir Idriss	Sudan	Sprinting	2005	Norandrosterone	2 years	
Samson Idiata	Nigeria	Long jump	2015	Clenbuterol	4 years	
Gulustan Ieso	Iraq	Sprinting	2011	Methylhexaneamine	1 year	
Kirill Ikonnikov	Russia	Hammer throw	2012	Dehydrochloromethyltestosterone	2 years	
Chidi Imoh	Nigeria	Sprinting	1994		4 years	
Cristinel Irimia	Romania	Long distance	2014	Exogenous steroids	2 years	
Ekaterina Ishova (Ekaterina Gorbunova)	Russia	Middle/Long distance	2011	Biological passport	2 years	
Daniel Ivanov	Bulgaria	Long jump	1993	Amphetamine		
Lyubov Ivanova (Lyubov Kharlamova)	Russia	Steeplechase	2006	Methyltestosterone	2 years	
Olimpiada Ivanova	Russia	Race walking	1997	Stanazolol	2 years	
Kathy Jager	United States			Hydrochlorothiazide, Chlorothiazide		
Regina Jacobs	United States	Middle distance	2003	THG	4 years	
Norjannah Hafiszah Jamaludin	Malaysia	Sprinting	2011	Evading doping control	2 years	
Patrick Jarrett	Jamaica	Sprinting	2001	Stanozolol	2 years	
Helena Javornik	Slovenia	Middle/Long distance	2008	EPO	2 years	
Violah Jepchumba	Kenya	Long distance	2017	EPO	4 years	
Ruth Jebet	Kenya	Steeplechase	2017	EPO	4 years	
Mark Jelks	United States	Sprinting	2010	3 Whereabouts failures	2 year ban	
Winnie Jemutai	Kenya	Middle distance	2023	Testosterone	3 year ban	
Cordera Jenkins	United States	Hurdling	2006	Cannabis	Public warning	
Rita Jeptoo	Kenya	Marathon	2014	EPO	2 years	
Agatha Jeruto Kimaswai	Kenya	Middle distance	2015	Norandrosterone	4 years	
Olivera Jevtić	Yugoslavia	Long distance	2002	Ephedrine	Public warning and disqualification from the 2002 New York City Marathon	
Antonio David Jiménez	Spain	Steeplechase	2014	Possession of a prohibited substance	3 years	
Ben Johnson	Canada	Sprinting	1988; 1989; 1993; 1999	Positive test: Stanozolol; Self admittance: Steroids (1982–1988); Testosterone; Hydrochlorothiazide	2 years Life ban	
Gea Johnson	United States	Heptathlon	1994	Anabolic steroids	4 years	
Marion Jones	United States	Sprinting/Long jump	2000–2006	THG (investigation > admittance)	2 year ban and a 6 month jail sentence	
LaVerne Jones-Ferrette	United States Virgin Islands	Sprinting	2010	Clomiphene	6 months	
Sini Jose	India	Sprinting	2011	Methandienone	2 years	
Milan Jotanović	Serbia	Shot put	2008	Salbutamol	8 months	
Dariusz Juzyszyn	Poland	Discus throw	1983			
Robert Kajuga	Rwanda	Long distance	2015	Refusal	4 years	
Abubaker Ali Kamal	Qatar	Middle distance	2011	EPO	2 years	
Pauline Kahenya	Kenya	Long distance	2013	Prednisone, Prednisolone	1 year	
Alissa Kallinikou	Cyprus	Sprinting	2008	Testosterone	2 years	
Tayeb Kalloud	Algeria	Long distance	2008	Norandrosterone	2 years	
Svetlana Kanatova	Russia	Middle distance				
Vladimir Kanaykin	Russia	Race walking	2008; 2011	EPO; Biological passport	2 years 8 years	
Olga Kaniskina	Russia	Race walking	2009	Biological passport	3 years and 2 months	
Adil Kaouch	Morocco	Middle distance	2007	EPO	2 years	
Anastasiya Kapachinskaya	Russia	Sprinting	2004	Stanozolol	2 years	
Julien Kapek	France	Triple jump	2009	3 Whereabouts Failures within 18-month period	1 year	
Natallia Kareiva	Belarus	Middle distance	2010	Biological passport	2 years	
Halina Karnatsevich	Belarus	Long distance	2006	Stanozolol	2 years	
Yanina Karolchyk-Pravalinskaya	Belarus	Shot put	2003	Clenbuterol	2 years	
Mohamed Katir	Spain	Long distance	2023	3 whereabouts failures in a 12-month period and tampering with an anti-doping investigation	2 years and 4 years	
Mandeep Kaur	India	Sprinting	2011	Stanozolol, Methandienone	2 years	
Ali Ekber Kayas	Turkey	Sprinting	2012	Oxandrolone	2 years	
Tatyana Kazankina	Soviet Union	Middle distance	1984	Refusal to submit to doping control	18 months	
Héni Kechi	France	Sprinting	2007	Cannabis	3 months	
Lisa Kehler	Great Britain	Race walking	2007	Terbutaline	Public warning	
Naman Keïta	France	Hurdling, sprinting	2007	Testosterone precursors	2 years	
Gloria Kemasuode (Gloria Ubiebor)	Nigeria	Sprinting	2009	Metenolone, ephedrine	2 years	
Simon Kemboi	Kenya	Sprinting	2000	Nandrolone		
Kostas Kenteris	Greece	Sprinting	2004	Evasion of doping control		
Kamy Keshmiri	United States	Discus throw	1992	Methandienone		
Atalelech Ketema	United States	Marathon	2014	Ephedrine	2 years	
Meryem Khali	Morocco	Long distance	2012	Norandrosterone	2 years	
Gulfiya Khanafeyeva	Russia	Hammer throw	Unknown; 2007	Unknown; Fraudulent substitution of urine	3 months 33 months	
Yekaterina Khoroshikh	Russia	Hammer throw	2007	6α-methylandrostendione	2 years	
Irina Khudoroshkina	Russia	Shot put	2004	Hydrochlorothiazide	2 years	
Molly Killingbeck	Canada	Sprinting	1980's	Self admittance of steroid use (Dubin inquiry)	—	
Gary Kinder	United States	Decathlon	1991	Failure to appear for mandatory drug test	(2 years) overturned due to flaws in testing protocol	
Benjamin Kipkurui	Kenya	Middle distance	2013		3 months	
Abraham Kiprotich	France	Marathon	2013	EPO	2 years	
Diana Kipoyeki	Kenya	Marathon	2021	triamcinolone acetonide Tampering	6 years	
Nabil Kirame	Morocco	Discus throw	2006; 2015	Cannabis; Stanozolol	Public warning 4 years	
Ümmü Kiraz	Turkey	Long distance	2011	Biological passport	2 years and 6 months	
Sergey Kirdyapkin	Russia	Race walking	2009	Biological passport	3 years and 2 months	
Mathew Kipkoech Kisorio	Kenya	Long distance	2012	Norandrosterone	2 years	
Rael Kiyara	Kenya	Long distance	2012	Norandrosterone	2 years	
Svetlana Klyuka	Russia	Middle distance	2009	Biological passport	2 years	
Erriyon Knighton	United States	Sprinting	2024	Trenbolone	4 years	
Markus Koistinen	Finland	Shot put	1996	hCG (Human chorionic gonadotropin)	4 years	(Finnish)
Nemanja Kojić	Serbia	Middle distance	2015	Furosemide	2 years	
Teodora Kolarova	Bulgaria	Middle distance	2007	Testosterone	2 years	
Nikolay Kolev	Bulgaria	Discus throw	1987			
Francisca Koki; Koki Manunga	Kenya	Hurdling	2015	Furosemide	4 years	
Eirini Kokkinariou	Greece	Steeplechase	2009	Biological passport	4 years	
Mikuláš Konopka	Slovakia	Shot put	2002; 2008	Stanozolol; Methandienone	2 years Life ban	
Ilya Konovalov	Russia	Hammer throw	2006	Acetazolamide	2 years	
Mariya Konovalova	Russia	Long distance	2009	Biological passport	2 years	
Oleksandr Korchmid	Ukraine	Pole vault	2009	Ephedrine	Public warning	
Aleksey Korolev	Russia	Hammer throw	2009	Methandienone	2 years	
Irina Korzhanenko	Russia	Shot put	1999; 2004	Steroids; Stanozolol	2 years Life ban	
Yekaterina Kostetskaya	Russia	Middle distance	2011	Biological passport	2 years	
Dmytro Kosynskyy	Ukraine	Javelin throw	2011	Testosterone	2 years	
Tatyana Kotova	Russia	Long jump	2005 (Sample retested 2013)	Formestane	2 years	
Zoltán Kővágó	Hungary	Discus throw	2011	Refusal to submit	2 years	
Ayman Kozhakhmetova	Kazakhstan	Race walk	2013	Testosterone, EPO	2 years	
Katrin Krabbe	Germany	Sprinting	1992	Clenbuterol	3 years	
Inessa Kravets	Ukraine	Long/Triple jump	1993; 2000	Stimulant; Anabolic steroid	3 months 2 years	
Lyubov Kremlyova	Russia	Middle distance	1995	Steroids	4 years	
Heidi Krieger (Andreas Krieger)	East Germany	Shot put	1980's	Self admission: Anabolic steroids	—	
Svetlana Krivelyova	Russia	Shot put	2004 (Sample retested 2012)	Oxandrolone	2 years	
Valentin Kruglyakov	Russia	Sprinting	2013	Nandrolone	4 years	
Pavel Kryvitski	Belarus	Hammer throw	2015	HGH	4 years	
Wioletta Kryza	Poland	Long distance	2002; 2012	Testosterone	2 years 8 years	
Anastassya Kudinova	Kazakhstan	Sprinting	2016	Drostanolone	4 years	
Anil Kumar	India	Discus throw	2005	Norandrosterone	2 years	
Eyerusalem Kuma	Ethiopia	Long distance	2013	EPO	2 years	
Kagisho Kumbane	South Africa	Sprinting	2012	Norandrosterone	2 years	
Yeliz Kurt	Turkey	Middle distance	2013	Stanozolol	2 years	
Damian Kusiak	Poland	Shot put	2012	Stanozolol	2 years	(in Polish)
Olga Kuzenkova	Russia	Hammer throw	2004 (Sample retested 2012)	Formestane, Hydroxytestosterone	2 years	
Mikko Kyyrö	Finland	Discus throw	2007	Methylprednisolone	Public warning	
Abdelhadi Labäli	Morocco	Middle distance	2012	Biological passport	2 years	
Soumiya Labani	Morocco	Long distance, cross country	2003	Nandrolone	2 years	
Florent Lacasse	France	Middle distance	2007	Testosterone precursors	2 years	
Amine Laâlou	Morocco	Middle distance	2012; 2016	Furosemide; EPO	2 years 8 years	
Aziz Lahbabi	Morocco	Long distance	2011	Methylhexanamine	6 months	
Laiyuan Gao	China	Long distance	2012	Anabolic steroids	2 years	
Burger Lambrechts	South Africa	Shot put	2001	Stanozolol	2 years	
Enrique Llanos	Puerto Rico	Hurdling	2008	Stanozolol	2 years	
Elena Lashmanova	Russia	Race walking	2014	GW1516	2 years	
Svetlana Laukhova	Russia	Hurdling	2001			
Bola Gee Lawal	Nigeria	Sprinting	2010	Methandienone	2 years	
Jeff Laynes	United States	Sprinting	2001	Stanozolol	2 years	
Yuliya Leantsiuk	Belarus	Shot put	2008	Testosterone	2 years	
Suzette Lee	Jamaica	Triple jump	2005	Salbutamol	Public warning	
Mikhail Lemaev	Russia	Marathon	2009	Biological passport	2 years	
Assunta Legnante	Italy	Shot put	2000		Public warning	
Asmae Leghzaoui	Morocco	Middle distance	2003	EPO	2 years	
Aleksey Lesnichiy	Belarus	High jump	2004	Clenbuterol	2 years	
Mikołaj Lewański	Poland	Sprinting	2007	Cannabis	Public warning	
Carl Lewis	United States	Sprinting, long jump		Pseudoephedrine, ephedrine, phenylpropanolamine (inadvertent use)		
Mark Lewis-Francis	Great Britain	Sprinting	2005	Cannabis	Public warning	
Li Ji	China	Long distance	2001		2 years	
Elmar Lichtenegger	Austria	Hurdling	2003; 2007	Nandrolone; Norandrosterone	15 months Life ban	
Lim Eun-ji	South Korea	Pole vault	2010	Hydrochlorothiazide, Chlorothiazide	3 months	
Lim Hee-nam	South Korea	Sprinting	2011	Methylhexaneamine	6 months	
Lin Na	China	Middle distance	2002		2 years	
Piotr Lisek	Poland	Pole vault	2012	Methylhexaneamine	6 months	
Yin Lili	China					
Liu Hong	China	Race walk	2016	Higenamine	1 month	
Liu Huyuan	China	Long distance	2002		2 years	
Liu Jing	China	Hurdling	2001	Refusal to submit to doping control	2 years	
Liu Yunfeng	China	Race walking	2001			
Jason Livingston	Great Britain	Sprinting	1992	Methandienone	4 years	
Jud Logan	United States	Hammer throw	1992	Clenbuterol	4 years	
Cathal Lombard	Ireland	Middle distance	2004	EPO	2 years	
Andrea Longo	Italy	Middle distance	2001	Nandrolone	2 years	
Gilmar Lopes	Brazil	Long distance	2014	Hydrochlorothiazide	1 year	
Juan Miguel López	Cuba	Triple jump	1986			
Wilson Loyanae	Kenya	Long distance	2012	EPO	2 years	
Chris Lukezic	United States	Middle distance	2010	Refusal to submit to doping control	2 years	
Nataliia Lupu	Ukraine	Middle-distance	2014	Methylhexaneamine	9 months	
Lü Huihui	China	Javelin throw	2013		1 year	
Vyacheslav Lykho	Soviet Union	Shot put	1990	Pseudoephedrine		
Tatyana Lysenko	Russia	Hammer throw	2007	6α-methylandrostendione	2 years	
Kaarlo Maaninka	Finland	Long distance	1980	Self admittance: Blood transfusioins (not illegal at the time)	—	
Remigius Machura (born 1960)	Czechoslovakia	Shot put	1985; 1981–	Stanozolol; Self admittance: Anabolic steroids	2 years (Reduced from life ban) —	
Remigius Machura (born 1986)	Czech Republic	Shot put	2010	HGH	2 years	
Colin Mackenzie	Great Britain	Javelin throw	1994		3 months	
Simon Magakwe	South Africa	Sprinting	2014	Refusal to submit to doping control	2 years	
Maurren Maggi	Brazil	Long jump	2003	Clostebol	2 years	
Mike Mahovlich	Canada	Javelin throw	1986			
Edi Maia	Portugal	Pole vault	2008	Cannabis	Public warning, disqualification from events	
Pascal Mancini	Switzerland	Sprinting	2011; 2012	Undisclosed; Norandrosterone	Public warning 2 years	
Luvo Manyonga	South Africa	Long jump	2012	Methamphetamine	18 months	
Irina Maracheva	Russia	Middle distance	2012	Biological passport	2 years	
Pascal Maran	France	Hurdling	1997	Ephedrine	Public warning and disqualification	
Natalia Mărășescu	Romania	Middle distance	1979	Anabolic steroids	8 months	
Brian Mariano	Netherlands	Sprinting	2016	Stanozolol	4 years	
Martin Marić	Croatia	Discus throw	2014	Ostarine (SARMs)	2 years	
Itay Margalit	Israel	High jump	1999	Nandrolone		
Marina Marghieva	Moldova	Hammer throw	2012	Stanozolol	2 years	
Zalina Marghieva	Moldova	Hammer throw	2009 {Retested 2013)	Dehydrochloromethyltestosterone, stanozolol	2 years	
Dzmitry Marshin	Azerbaijan	Hammer throw	2015	Dehydrochloromethyltestosterone	4 years	
LaVonna Martin-Floreal	United States	Hurdling	1991	Furosemide	14 months (Reduced from 2 years)	
David Martínez	Spain	Discus throw	1997	Nandrolone	2 years	
Yousef Masrahi	Saudi Arabia	Sprinting	2016	EPO	4 years	
Maude Mathys	Switzerland	Ultramarathon/Ski mountaineering	2015	Clomifene	Public warning	
Richard Mavuso	South Africa	Long distance	2011	Norandrosterone	2 years	
Natasha Mayers	Saint Vincent and the Grenadines	Sprinting	2005	T/E-4	2 years	
Eduard Mbengani	Portugal	Middle/Long distance	2010	EPO	2 years	
John McEwen	United States	Hammer throw	2003	Tetrahydrogestrinone, Modafinil	2 years	
Mark McKoy	Canada	Hurdling	1980's	Self admittance of steroid use (Dubin inquiry)	2 years	
Inika McPherson	United States	High jump	2014	Benzoylecgonine	21 months	
Ekaterina Medvedeva	Russia	Race Walking	2013	EPO	2 years	
Nijolė Medvedeva	Lithuania	Long jump	1992	Mesocarb		
Fathi Meftah	Algeria	Long distance	2008	Norandrosterone	2 years	
Irina Meleshina	Russia	Long jump	2012	Testosterone	2 years	
Jimmy Melfort	France	Sprinting	2012	Methylhexaneamine	3 months	
Mihaela Melinte	Romania	Hammer throw	2000	Nandrolone	2 years	
Miroslav Menc	Czech Republic	Shot put	1998; 2001	Stanozolol; Norandrosterone	2 years Life ban	
Amewu Mensah	Germany	High jump	2001	Oxandrolone	2 years	
LaShawn Merritt	United States	Sprinting	2009/2010	Testosterone	21 months	
Elena Meuti	Italy	High jump	2012	Tetrahydrocannabinol	5 months	
Karin Mey Melis	Turkey	Long jump	2012	Testosterone	2 years	
Gabriela Mihalcea	Romania	High jump	1987		2 years	
Andrei Mikhnevich	Belarus	Shot put	2001; 2005 (Retested in 2012)	Human chorionic gonadotropin Clenbuterol, Methandienone, Oxandrolone	2 years Life ban	
Natallia Mikhnevich	Belarus	Shot put	2013	Stanozolol	2 years	
Inger Miller	United States	Sprinting	1999	Caffeine	Public warning	
Tatyana Mineeva	Russia	Race walking	2011	Biological passport anomalies	2 years	
Ildar Minshin	Russia	Steeplechase	2009	Biological passport anomalies	2 years	
Yevgeniy Mironov	Soviet Union	Shot put	1978	Anabolic steroids	18 months	
Anna Mishchenko	Ukraine	Middle distance	2012	Biological passport	2 years	
Dennis Mitchell	United States	Sprinting	1998; BALCO scandal	Testosterone; Admittance in court: HGH	2 years —	
Diane Modahl	United Kingdom	Middle distance	1994	Testosterone	Fully exonerated	
Ofentse Mogawane	South Africa	Sprinting	2006	Methylprednisolone	Public warning	
Ghofrane Mohammad	Syria	Hurdling	2012	Methylhexaneamine	6 months	
Felicia Moldovan (Felicia Tilea)	Romania	Javelin throw	1990		2 years	
Tim Montgomery	United States	Sprinting	2001; 2000	BALCO investigation: Steroids, HGH; Public admittance in 2008: Testosterone, HGH	2 years	
Amantle Montsho	Botswana	Sprinting	2014	Methylhexaneamine	2 years	
Luis Morales	Puerto Rico	Sprinting	1988		2 years	
Sara Moreira	Portugal	Long-distance	2011	Methylhexaneamine	6 months	
Eder Moreno	Colombia	Shot put	2014	Stanozolol	2 years	
Sheryl Morgan	Jamaica	Sprinting	2003		Public warning	
Sergey Morozov	Russia	Race walking	2008; 2011	EPO; Biological passport anomalies	2 years Life ban	
Ramolefi Motsieloa	Lesotho	Long distance	2014	Methylhexaneamine	2 years	
William Motti	France	Decathlon	1989		2 years	
Bertrand Moulinet	France	Race walking	2015	FG-4592 (HIF inhibitor)	4 years	
Hassan Mourhit	Belgium	Long distance	2008	Anastrozol	2 years	
Mohammed Mourhit	Belgium	Middle/Long distance	2002	EPO	2 years	
Gael Mulhall	Australia	Discus throw, shot put	1981	Anabolic steroids	18 months	
Ángel Mullera	Spain	Steeplechase	2015	Refusal	2 years	
Steve Mullings	Jamaica	Sprinting	2004; 2011	Testosterone; Furosemide	2 years Life ban	
Julia Mumbi Muraga	Kenya	Marathon	2014	EPO	2 years	
Jauna Murmu	India	Sprinting	2011	Methandienone	2 years	
Sammy Alex Mutahi	Kenya	Long distance	2011		Public reprimand, disqualification of result	
Elizabeth Muthuka	Kenya	Sprinting	2008	Norandrosterone	2 years	
Semiha Mutlu (Semiha Metlu-Ozdemir)	Turkey	Race walk	2011	Biological passport	2 years and 6 months	
Carl Myerscough	Great Britain	Shot put	1999	Anabolic steroids	2 years	
Melissa Myerscough (née Melissa Price)	United States	Hammer throw	2003	THG	2 years	
Larry Myricks	United States	Long jump	1990	Phenylpropanolomine		
Cédric Nabe	Switzerland	Sprinting	2011	Whereabouts failure ×3	18 months Extended by CAS from 1 year	
Rachid Nadij	Morocco	Long distance	2007	Ephedrine	3 months	
Kaltouma Nadjina	Chad	Sprinting	2009		Reprimand and disqualification of result	
Tezzhan Naimova	Bulgaria	Sprinting	2008; 2013	Tampering with test Drostanolone	2 years Life ban	
Cosmas Ndeti	Kenya	Long distance	1988	Ephedrine	3 months	
Lisa Nemec	Croatia	Long distance	2015	EPO	4 years	
John Ngugi	Kenya	Long distance	1993	Missed test		
Antoni Niemczak	Poland	Marathon	1986	Nandrolone	2 years	
Larisa Nikitina (Larisa Turchinskaya)	Soviet Union	Heptathlon	1990	Amphetamines		
Ilja Nikolajev	Estonia	Marathon	2013	Biological passport	2 years	
Lars Arvid Nilsen	Norway	Shot put	1987; 1992	Probenecid, Anabolic steroids Metenolone	2 years Life ban	(in Norwegian)
Cyrus Njui	Kenya	Long distance	2015	Methylephedrine	8 months	
Siyabonga Nkonde	South Africa	Cross country running	2014		6 months	
Nadia Noujani	Morocco	Long distance	2014	EPO	2 years	
Jonathan Nsenga	Belgium	Hurdling	1997	Ephedrine		
Juan Núñez	Dominican Republic	Sprinting	1983	Fencamfamine		
Liliya Nurutdinova	Russia	Middle distance	1993	Stanozolol	4 years	
Musa Amer Obaid	Qatar	Steeplechase	2006	Testosterone	2 years	
Al Oerter	United States	Discus throw	1976	Anabolic steroids. (Self-admitted)	—	
Deborah Oluwaseun Odeyemi	Nigeria	Sprinting	2015	Metenolone	4 years	
Amaka Ogoegbunam	Nigeria	Sprinting	2009	Metenolone	3 years	
Femi Ogunode	Qatar	Sprinting	2011	Clenbuterol	2 years	
Christine Ohuruogu	Great Britain	Sprinting	2006	3 whereabouts failures	1 year	
Aham Okeke	Norway	Sprinting	1994; 2006	Testosterone, Pseudoephedrine; Testosterone	30 months Life ban	(in Norwegian) (in Norwegian)
Samuel Okon	Nigeria	Hurdling	2010	Methylhexanamine		
Iulia Olteanu	Romania	Cross country	1996	Stanozolol	2 years	
Omolara Omotosho	Nigeria	Sprinting	2009	Metenolone	2 years	
Mary Onyali-Omagbemi	Nigeria	Sprinting	1996	Ephedrine	3 months	
Janet Ongera	Kenya	Long distance	2002	Norandrosterone	2 years	
Josephine Onyia	Spain	Hurdling	2008; 2011; 2015	Methylhexaneamine, Clenbuterol; Methylhexaneamine; Metenolone	2 years 2 years Life ban	
Charity Opara	Nigeria	Sprinting	1992		4 years	
Helder Ornelas	Portugal	Marathon	2010	Biological passport	4 years	
Yolanda Osana	Dominican Republic	Hurdling	2012	Stanozolol	2 years	
Oludamola Osayomi	Nigeria	Sprinting	2010	Methylhexaneamine		
Artur Osman	Poland	Long distance	2005	Norandrosterone	2 years	
Nadzeya Ostapchuk	Belarus	Shot put	2012; 2005 (Retested in 2012)	Metenolone; Formestane, 4-Hydroxytestosterone	4 years	
Hanane Ouhaddou	Morocco	Steeplechase	2009	Biological passport	2 years	
Lawretta Ozoh	Nigeria	Sprinting	2012	Stanozolol	2 years	
Noraldo Palacios	Colombia	Javelin throw	2008	Betamethasone	6 months	
Gergely Palágyi	Hungary	Hurdling	2006	Stanozolol	2 years	
Diego Palomeque	Colombia	400 m	2012	Testosterone	2 years	
Géza Pauer	Hungary	Sprinting	2006	Boldenone	2 years	
Vita Pavlysh	Ukraine	Shot put	1999; 2004	Stanozolol; Stanozolol	2 years Life ban	
Yevgeniya Pecherina	Russia	Discus throw	2011; 2013	Methandienone; Oral Turinabol	2 years 10 years	
Arne Pedersen	Norway	Shot put	1987	Probenecid	3 years	
Larisa Peleshenko	Russia	Shot put	1995	Steroid	4 years	
Lyubov Perepelova	Uzbekistan	Sprinting	2005	Hydrochloromethyltestosterone	2 years	
Vanja Perišić	Croatia	Middle distance	2008 (Sample re-analysed 2009)	CERA	2 years	
Sandra Perković	Croatia	Discus throw	2011	Methylhexanamine	6 months	
Asko Pesonen	Finland	High jump	1977	Anabolic steroid	1 year	
Tetiana Petlyuk	Ukraine	Middle distance	2009	Biological passport anomalies	2 years	
Antonello Petrei	Italy	Long distance	2007	NESP (EPO)	2 years	
Totka Petrova	Bulgaria	Middle distance	1979	Anabolic steroids	8 months	
Antonio Pettigrew	United States	400 m	1997–2001	Admittance in court: HGH, EPO	2 years	
Denis Petushinskiy	New Zealand	Pole vault	1998	Stanozolol	4 years	
Lebogang Phalula	South Africa	Cross country running	2011	Methylhexaneamine	1 year (Extended from 3 months)	
Chris Phillips	United States	110 m hurdles	2003	Modafinil	Public warning	
Amaia Piedra	Spain	Long distance	2005	EPO	2 years	
Bruce Pirnie	Canada	Shot put		Self admittance (Dubin inquiry): Steroids	—	
Darya Pishchalnikova	Russia	Discus throw	2007; 2012	Fraudulent substitution of urine Oxandrolone	33 months 10 years	
Vladyslav Piskunov	Ukraine	Hammer trow	1994; 2005	Drostanolone	Life ban	
Darya Pizhankova	Ukraine	Sprinting	2011; 2013	Stanozolol; Drostanolone	2 years Life ban	
Maurie Plant	Australia	Manager		Official who substituted one athlete's urine for another prior to a test.		
Daniel Plaza	Spain	Race walking	1996	Nandrolone	2 years	
Ben Plucknett	United States	Discus throw	1981	Anabolic steroids		
Hristos Polihroniou	Greece	Hammer throw	2005; 2008	Clomiphene; Refusal to submit to doping control	2 years Life ban	
Dmitriy Polyunin	Uzbekistan	Javelin throw	1993	Stanozolol		
Liliana Popescu	Romania	Middle distance	2008	EPO	2 years	
Svetlana Pospelova	Russia	400 m	2000	Stanozolol	2 years	
Asafa Powell	Jamaica	Sprinting	2013	Oxilofrine	6 months	
Donovan Powell	Jamaica	Sprinting	1995	Ephedrine	3 months	
Kofi Amoah Prah	Germany	Long jump	2008; 2009	Cocaine; Competing while banned	2 years 2 years	
Iva Prandzheva	Bulgaria	Triple jump/Long jump	1996; 2000	Methandrostenolone; Nandrolone	2 years (Reduced from 4); Life ban	
Callum Priestley	Great Britain	Hurdling	2010	Clenbuterol	2 years	
Marin Premeru	Croatia	Shot put	2016	GHRP-2	4 years	
Yelena Prokhorova	Russia	Heptathlon	2005		1 year	
Marcelo Pugliese	Argentina	Discus throw	2006	Stanozolol	2 years	
Susanne Pumper	Austria	Long distance	2008; 2013	EPO; Possession of a Prohibited Substance	2 years 8 years	
Yekaterina Puzanova	Russia	Middle distance	2003	Norandrosterone, androstenedione	2 years	
Nataliya Pyhyda	Ukraine	Sprinting	2009	Stanozolol	2 years	
Paul Quirke	Ireland	Shot put	1987	Missed test		
Nikolay Raev	Bulgaria	Triple jump	1993	Amphetamine		
Ebrahim Rahimian	Iran	Race walk	2013	Testosterone, EPO	2 years	
Paweł Rakoczy	Poland	Javelin throw	2008	Sibutramine	Public warning	
Sara Ramadhani	Tanzania	Cross country running	2014	Isometheptene	2 years	
Rashid Ramzi	Bahrain	Middle distance	2008 {Re-analysed in 2009)	CERA	2 years	
Allison Randall	Jamaica	Discus throw	2013	Hydrochlorothiazide	2 years	
Kevin Rans	Belgium	Pole vault	2009	Corticosteroids	3 months	
Meliz Redif	Turkey	Sprinting	2012	Biological passport	3 years	
Dimitrios Regas	Greece	Sprinting	2008	Methyltrienolone	2 years	
Julio Rey	Spain	Long distance	1999	Mesterolone	2 years	
Butch Reynolds	United States	Sprinting	1990	Anabolic steroids	2 years	
Antoine Richard	France	Sprinting	1987		2 years	
Mark Richardson	Great Britain	Sprinting	1999	Nandrolone	18 months (reduced from 2 years)	
Elisa Rigaudo	Italy	Race walking	2002	Caffeine	Public warning	
Hristina Risteska	Macedonia	Sprinting	2015	Stanozolol, methandienone, norandrosterone	4 years	
José Rocha	Portugal	Long distance	2010	Biological passport anomalies	2 years	
Mike Rodgers	United States	Sprinting	2011	Methylhexaneamine	9 months	
Rosa America Rodríguez	Venezuela	Long distance	2010	Nandrolone	2 years	
Zudikey Rodríguez	Mexico	Sprinting	2010	Methylhexanamine	6 months	
Marielis Rojas	Venezuela	High jump	2011	Norandrosterone	2 years	
Fabrício Romero	Brazil	High jump	2000		Public warning	
Anália Rosa	Portugal	Long distance	2015	Methylprednisolone	2 years	
Danuta Rosani	Poland	Discus throw	1976	Steroids		
Ak Hafiy Tajuddin Rositi	Brunei	Sprinting	2013	Nandrolone	2 years	
Duane Ross	United States	Hurdling	2001	Possession, trafficking, attempted use (BALCO scandal)	2 years	
Joshua Ross	Australia	Sprinting	2013	3 Whereabouts Failures within an 18-month period	1 year and 6 months	
Randolph Ross	United States	Sprinting	2022	3 Whereabouts Failures within a 12-month period, doctored evidence	3 years	
Serene Ross	United States	Javelin throw	2005	Hydrochlorothiazide, Triamterene	2 years	
Mark Rowe	United States	Sprinting	1989	Methyltestosterone	2 years	
Yuliya Ruban	Ukraine	Marathon	2012	Biological passport	2 years	
Andrey Rudnitskiy	Russia	Sprinting	2008	Carphedon, cannabis	2 years	
Timothy Rusan	United States	Triple jump	2004	Tetrahydrocannabinol, Salbutamol	Public warning	
Yuliya Rusanova	Russia	Middle distance	2011	Biological passport anomalies	2 years	
Ronald Rutto	Kenya	Long distance	2012	EPO	2 years	
Andrey Ruzavin	Russia	Race walking	2011	Biological passport anomalies	2 years and 6 months	
Yelena Ryabova	Turkmenistan	Sprinting	2013	Dehydrochloromethyltestosterone	2 years	
Mariya Ryemyen	Ukraine	Sprinting	2014	Methandienone	2 years	
Kseniya Ryzhova	Russia	Sprinting	2014	Trimetazidine	9 months	
Natalya Sadova	Russia	Discus throw	2001; 2006	Caffeine; Methandienone	Public warning 2 years	
Darya Safonova	Russia	Sprinting	2005	Pemoline	2 years	
Jan Sagedal	Norway	Shot put	1987; 1992	Probenecid; Methandienone	2 years 4 years	(in Norwegian)
Tuğçe Şahutoğlu	Turkey	Hammer throw	2013	Stanozolol	2 years	
Ali Saïdi-Sief	Algeria	Long distance	2001	Nandrolone	2 years	
Jaysuma Saidy Ndure	Norway	Sprinting	2007	Cannabis	Public warning, disqualification of results	
Pınar Saka	Turkey	Sprinting	2010	Biological passport	3 years	
Alberto Salazar	United States	Coach	2019	Possession of Testosterone, administration of a prohibited method, tampering	4 years	
Mounira Al-Saleh	Syria	Sprinting	2005; 2010	Stanozolol; Stanozolol	2 years Life ban	
Jeremias Saloj	Guatemala	Long distance	2013	EPO	2 years	
Sergio Sanchez	Spain	Long distance	2013	EPO	2 years	
Leevan Sands	Bahamas	Triple jump	2006	Levmetamfetamine	6 months	
Fabiane dos Santos	Brazil	Middle distance	1995; 2001	Nandrolone; Testosterone	4 years Life ban	
Leonardo Elisiário dos Santos	Brazil	Triple jump	2009	Stanozolol	2 years	
Vladimir Sasimovich	Belarus	Javelin throw	2004	Stanozolol	2 years	
Garrett Scantling	United States	Decathlete	2022	3 Whereabouts Failures within a 12-month period	3 years	
Lindsey Scherf	United States	Long distance	2007	Refusal to submit to doping control	1 year	
Alex Schwazer	Italy	Race walking	2012; 2012; 2016	EPO; Evading doping control Anabolic steroid	42 months 3 months 8 years	
Dorian Scott	Jamaica	Shot put	2006	Cannabis	Public warning	
Gregory Sedoc	Netherlands	Hurdling	2011	3 whereabouts failures	1 year	
Hezekiél Sepeng	South Africa	Middle distance	2005	Norandrosterone	2 years	
Mustapha Sdad	Morocco	Hurdling	2002		3 years	
Mohammed Shaween	Saudi Arabia	Middle distance	2011	Biological passport	3 years	
Tony Sharpe	Canada	Sprinting	1980s	Self admittance of steroid use (Dubin inquiry)	—	
Anzhelika Shevchenko	Ukraine	Middle distance	2011	Biological passport	2 years	
Dmitriy Shevchenko	Russia	Discus throw	1995	Metandienone metabolite	4 years	
Olga Shishigina	Kazakhstan	Hurdling	1996	Stanozolol	2 years (Reduced from 4 years)	
Olga Shchukina	Uzbekistan	Shot put	2004	Clenbuterol	2 years	
Oleksiy Shelest	Ukraine	Race walking	2009	Carphedon	2 years	
Natalya Shekhodanova	Russia	Hurdling	1996; 2004	Stanozolol; Stanozolol	2 years Life ban	
Svitlana Shmidt	Ukraine	Middle distance	2012	Biological passport	4 years	
Liliya Shobukhova	Russia	Marathon	2009	Biological passport	2 years and 7 months (Reduced from 3 years and 2 months)	
Marina Shmonina	Russia	Sprinting	1993	Stanozolol	4 years	
Sadaf Siddiqui	Pakistan	Sprinting	2010		2 years	
Ileana Silai	Romania	Middle distance	1979	Anabolic steroids	8 months	
Zdeňka Šilhavá	Czechoslovakia	Discus throw	1985	Anabolic steroids	18 months (Reduced from life ban)	
Fernando Silva	Portugal	Long distance	2006; 2013	EPO; Biological passport	2 years 8 years	
Lucimara da Silva	Brazil	Heptathlon	2009	EPO	2 years	
Simone Alves da Silva	Brazil	Long-distance track running	2010; 2011	Oxilofrine; EPO	3 months 5 years	
Boštjan Šimunic	Slovenia	Triple jump	2006	Drostanolone	2 years	
Sherone Simpson	Jamaica	Sprinting	2013	Oxilofrine	6 months	
Neelam Jaswant Singh	India	Discus throw	2005	Pemoline	2 years	
George Skafidas	Greece	Coach		Tampering, possession of a prohibited substance, trafficking and administration of a prohibited substance	Life ban	
German Skurygin	Russia	Race walking	1999	Human chorionic gonadotrophin	2 years	
Ilona Slupianek	East Germany	Shot put	1977	Nandrolone	1 year	
Irina Slyusar	Soviet Union	Sprinting	1991	Strychnine	3 months	
Traves Smikle	Jamaica	Discus Throw	2013	Hydrochlorothiazide	2 years	
Yelena Soboleva	Russia	Middle distance	2007	Fraudulent substitution of urine	33 months	
Carolin Soboll	Germany	Javelin throw	2000	Nandrolone	2 years	
Michael Sokolowski	Canada	Sprinting	1980s	Self admittance of steroid use (Dubin inquiry)	—	
Vasiliy Sokov	Russia	Triple jump	1995	Ephedrine	3 months	
Natallia Solohub	Belarus	Sprinting	2001	Norandrosterone	2 years	
Song Hongjuan	China	Race walking	2008	EPO	4 years	
Song Liqing	China	Long distance	2001		2 years	
Anastasiya Soprunova	Kazakhstan	Hurdling	2016	Stanozolol	4 years	
Dmitriy Sorokin	Russia	Triple jump	2011	Carphedon	2 years	
Javier Sotomayor	Cuba	High jump	1999; 2001	Cocaine; Nandrolon	1 year (Reduced from 2 years)	
João Gabriel Sousa	Brazil	Pole vault	2009	Exemestane, boldenone	2 years	
Wallace Spearmon	United States	Sprinting	2014	Methylprednisolone	3 months	
Lansford Spence	Jamaica	Sprinting	2009	Methylhexanamine	3 months	
Tânia Spindler	Brazil	Race walking	2012	Isometheptene	Public reprimand	
Gundega Sproģe	Latvia	Triple jump	1999	Anabolic steroid	2 years	(in Latvian)
Vania Stambolova	Bulgaria	Hurdling	2007	Testosterone	2 years	
Michalis Stamatogiannis	Greece	Shot put	2014	Stanozolol	2 years	
Claudia Ștef (Claudia Iovan)	Romania	Race walking	2000	Nandrolone	2 years	
Ato Stephens	Trinidad and Tobago	Sprinting	2009	Oxandrolone, Stanozolol and Tamoxifen	2 years	
Ray Stewart	Jamaica	Coach	2010	Trafficking and administering of prohibited substances	Life ban	
Elena Stoyanova	Bulgaria	Shot put	1978	Anabolic steroids	18 months	
Mike Stulce	United States	Shot put	1990; 1993	Testosterone; Mestanolone	2 years Life ban	
Sui Xinmei	China	Shot put	1991	Steroids	2 years	
Sun Yingjie	China	Long distance	2005	Androsterone	2 years	
Lars Sundin	Sweden	Discus throw	1987	Testosterone	18 months	(in Swedish)
Göran Svensson	Sweden	Discus throw	1987	Testosterone	18 months	(in Swedish)
Art Swarts	United States	Discus throw	1986	Testosterone	banned	
Luketz Swartbooi	Namibia	Long distance	2005	Prednisolone, prednisone	Public warning	
Olesya Syreva	Russia	Middle distance	2011; 2015	Biological passport Metenolone	2 years 8 years	
Attila Szabó	Hungary	Decathlon	2013	3 whereabouts failures	1 year	
Gina Coello Tache	Honduras	Marathon	2001	Nandrolone	2 years	
Gregg Tafralis	United States	Shot put	1995; 1999	Methandienone	2 years (Reduced from 4 years); Life ban	
Teddy Tamgho	France	Triple jump	2014	3 whereabouts failures	1 year	
William Tanui	Kenya	Middle distance	1993	Ephedrine		
Yoel Tapia	Dominican Republic	Sprinting	2012	Methylhexaneamine	6 months	
Kory Tarpenning	United States	Pole vault	1997	Anabolic steroids	2 years	
Angella Taylor-Issajenko	Canada	Sprinting	1979–1988	Self admittance of steroid use (Dubin inquiry): metandienone, oxandrolone, metenolone enanthate, nandrolone, human growth hormone, L-dopa, testosterone, Inosine, Furazabol	National and world records annulled	
Gladys Tejeda	Peru	Long distance	2015	Furosemide	6 months	
Lucimar Teodoro	Brazil	Hurdling	2009	Fenproporex	2 years	
Olga Tereshkova	Kazakhstan	400 metres	2011; 2014	Testosterone; Methyltestosterone	2 years Life ban	
Ana Mirela Ţermure	Romania	Javelin throw	2001	Norandrosterone	2 years	
James Kibocha Theuri	France	Long distance	2014	Whereabouts failures	1 year	
Cheryl Thibedeau	Canada	Sprinting	1987; 1992	Self admittance of steroid use (Dubin inquiry)	2 years Life ban	
Tsholofelo Thipe	South Africa	Sprinting	2012	Norandrosterone, testosterone	2 years	
Eric Thomas	United States	Hurdling	2003	Modafinil	Disqualification and public warning	
Susen Tiedtke	Germany	Long jump	1995	Turinabol	2 years	
Khalid Tighazouine	Morocco	Middle distance	2004	Nandrolone	2 years	
Ville Tiisanoja	Finland	Shot put	2006	Testosterone	2 years	
Irina Timofeyeva	Russia	Marathon	2009	Biological passport	2 years	
Josiane Tito	Brazil	Sprinting/Middle distance	2009	EPO	2 years	
Mamorallo Tjoka	Lesotho	Long distance	2014	Norandrosterone, Clenbuterol, Methylhexaneamine, Ephedrine and Prednisolone	2 years	
Nadiya Tkachenko	Soviet Union	Pentathlon	1978	Anabolic steroids	18 months	
Nataliya Tobias	Ukraine	Middle distance	2011	Testosterone	2 years	
Ambesse Tolosa	Ethiopia	Long distance	2008	Morphine	2 years	
Tatyana Tomashova	Russia	Middle distance	2007	Fraudulent substitution of urine	33 months	
Dragutin Topić	Serbia and Montenegro	High jump	2001	Nandrolone	2 years	
Kevin Toth	United States	Shot put	2003	THG	2 years	
Laïla Traby	France	Long distance	2014	EPO and refusal	3 years	
Silvana Trampuz	Australia	Long distance	2001	Nandrolone	2 years	
Marina Trandenkova	Russia	Sprinting	1996	Bromantane	Reprimand	
Alex Trembach	Israel	Sprinting	2008	Norandrosterone	2 years	
Ivan Tsikhan	Belarus	Hammer throw	2004 (Sample retested 2012)	Methandienone	2 years	
Maria Tsirba	Greece	Middle distance	2003	EPO, Ephedrine	2 years	
Athanasia Tsoumeleka	Greece	Race walking	2008	CERA	2 years	
Lyubov Tsyoma (Lyubov Kiryukhina-Tsyoma)	Russia	Middle distance	1997	Stanozolol	2 years	
Markku Tuokko	Finland	Shot put/ Discus throw	1977	Anabolic steroid	1 year	
Erik Tysse	Norway	Race walking	2010	CERA	2 years	
Romas Ubartas	Lithuania	Discus throw	1993; 2002	Boldenone; Boldenone	4 years	
Giampaolo Urlando	Italy	Hammer throw	1984	Testosterone		
Sergiu Ursu	Romania	Discus throw	2004; 2013	Nandrolone; Norandrosterone	2 years 2 years	
Binnaz Uslu	Turkey	Running	2007; 2011 (sample re-analysed 2013)	Testosterone; Stanozolol	2 years Life ban	
Roman Usov	Russia	Steeplechase	2008	Carphedon	2 years	
Jaanus Uudmäe	Estonia	Triple/long jump	2007	Sibutramine	Public warning	
Martti Vainio	Finland	Long distance	1984; 1983–1984	Positive test: Metenolone; Self admittance: Blood transfusions, Testosterone	18 months (Reduced from life ban)	
Euclides Varela	Cape Verde	Long distance	2012	3 whereabouts failures	18 months	
Roland Varga	Hungary	Discus throw	2006	Boldenone	2 years	
Andrei Varantsou	Belarus	Hammer throw	2005 (Sample retested 2012); January 2013; October 2013	Clomiphene, Oxandrolone; Oral Turinabol; Oral Turinabol	4 years Life ban	
Sebastian Varga	Romania		2006; 2009	Stanozolol; Metabolites of metandienone	2 years 8 years	
Aleksandr Vashchilo	Belarus	Hammer throw	2005	Cannabis	Public warning	
Cristina Vasiloiu	Romania	Middle distance	2008	EPO		
Nikolai Vedehin	Estonia	Middle distance	2015	Trimetazidine	4 years	
Velko Velev	Bulgaria	Hammer throw	1975	Anabolic steroids		
Michael Velter	Belgium	Triple jump	2006; 2011	Cannabis; Cannabis	3 months 21 months	
Venelina Veneva	Bulgaria	High jump	2007	Testosterone	2 years	
Oksana Verner	Kazakhstan	Middle distance	2010	Stanozolol	2 years	
Anna Verouli	Greece	Javelin throw	1984	Nandrolone	4 years	
Ioan Vieru	Romania	Sprinting	2004	Stanozolol	2 years	
Saurav Vij	India	Shot put	2010	Methylhexaneamine	2 years	
Igor Vinichenko	Russia	Hammer throw	2013	Dehydrochloromethyltestosterone	2 years	
Roman Virastyuk	Ukraine	Shot put	1991			(in Swedish)
Innis Viviers	South Africa	Sprinting	2003; 2005	Stanozolol; Stanozolol	2 years Life ban	
Aleksey Voyevodin	Russia	Race walking	2008	EPO	2 years	
Nadezhda Vorobieva	Russia	Middle distance	2004	Pemoline	2 years	
Letitia Vriesde	Suriname	Middle distance	2003	Caffeine	Public warning	
Yevhen Vynohradov	Ukraine	Hammer throw	2009	Nandrolone	2 years	
Larry Wade	United States	Hurdling	2004	19-Norandrosterone	2 years	
Alwin Wagner	West Germany	Discus throw	1977–1987	Self admittance: Steroids	—	
Erick Walder	United States	Long jump	2004	Amphetamine, Methamphetamine	2 years	
Aleksander Waleriańczyk	Poland	High jump	2003	Caffeine	Public warning	
Douglas Walker	Great Britain/Scotland	Sprinting	1998	Nandrolone	2 years	
Delisa Walton-Floyd	United States	Middle distance	1991	Amphetamine	4 years	
Wang Jiali	China	Marathon	2012	Biological passport	2 years	
Wang Jing	China	Sprinting	2009	Epitestosterone	4 years	
Wang Lina	China	Long jump	2005	Norandrosterone	2 years	
Wang Shizhu	China	Hammer throw	2013		Public reprimand	
Gareth Warburton	United Kingdom	Middle distance	2014	17α-methyl-5 β-androstane-3α,17β-diol	6 months	
Solomon Wariso	Great Britain/England	Sprinting	1994	Ephedrine	3 months	
Wei Yanan	China	Long distance	2002		2 years	
Renward Wells	Bahamas	Sprinting	2002		2 years	
Joan Wenzel	Canada	Middle distance	1975	Ephedrine		
Kelli White	United States	Sprinting	2003; 2000–2003	Positive test: Modafinil; BALCO scandal/Admission: THG, EPO	2 years	
Janine Whitlock	Great Britain	Pole vault	2002	Methandienone	2 years	
Bobby-Gaye Wilkins	Jamaica	Sprinting	2010	Andarine (SARMs)	2 years	
Bernard Williams	United States	Sprinting	2004	Cannabis	Public warning	
Christopher Williams	Jamaica	Sprinting	2009	Amphetamine and levmetamphetamine	2 years	
Desai Williams	Canada	Sprinting	1980s	Self admittance of steroid use (Dubin inquiry)	—	
Diane Williams	United States	Sprinting		Self admittance: Anabolic steroids	—	
Ivory Williams	United States	Sprinting	2010	Cannabis	3 months	
Rhys Williams	United Kingdom	Hurdling	2014	17β-hydroxyestra-4,9-diene-3-one	4 months	
Tameka Williams	Saint Kitts and Nevis	Sprinting	2012	Possession and use or attempted use of prohibited substance or method	3 years	
Bernice Wilson	United Kingdom	Sprinting	2011 and 2015	Anabolic steroid testosterone and Clenbuterol (1st offence), clomiphene (2nd offence)	4 years (1st offence), 10 months (2nd offence)	
Solange Witteveen	Argentina	High jump	2001	Pemoline	2 years	
Anna Włodarczyk	Poland	Long jump	1982			
Zerfe Wondemagegn	Ethiopia	Middle distance	2023	EPO and Testosterone	5 years	
Xiong Qiying	China	Long jump	1997			
Mariya Yakovenko	Russia	Javelin throw	2013	Dehydrochloromethyltestosterone	2 years	
Nevin Yanit	Turkey	Hurdling	2013	Stanozolol; Testosterone; Biological passport	3 years	
Oksana Yarygina	Russia	Javelin throw	2005	Metandienone (Dianabol)	2 years	
Iryna Yatchenko	Belarus	Discus throw	2004 (Sample retested in 2012)	Methandienone	2 years	
Antonina Yefremova	Ukraine	Sprinting	2012	Testosterone	2 years	
Olga Yegorova	Russia	Distance	2007	Tampering: Fraudulent substitution of urine	33 months	
Igor Yerokhin	Russia	Race walking	2008; 2013	EPO; Biological passport	2 years Life ban	
Vasiliy Yershov	Soviet Union	Javelin throw	1978	Anabolic steroids	18 months	
Elif Yildirim	Turkey	Sprinting	2013	Dehydrochloromethyltestosterone	2 years	
Yin Anna	China	Steeplechase	2014	EPO	2 years	
Daniela Yordanova	Bulgaria	Middle distance	2008	Testosterone	2 years	
Lyudmyla Yosypenko	Ukraine	Heptathlon	2011	Biological passport	4 years	
Jerome Young	United States	Sprinting	1999; 2004	Nandrolon; EPO	Life ban (2nd ADRV)	
Nailiya Yulamanova	Russia	Marathon	2009	Biological passport	2 years	
Irina Yumanova	Russia	Race walking	2014	SARMs	2 years	
Andriy Yurin	Ukraine	Race walking	2008	3 whereabouts failures	1 year	
Fatima Yvelain	France	Long distance	2012	EPO	2 years	
Aziz Zakari	Ghana	Sprinting	2006	Stanozolol	2 years	
Joy Sakari; Joy Nakhumicha Sakari	Kenya	Sprinting	2015	Furosemide	4 years	
Mahdi Zamani	Iran	400 m	2011	Methandienone	2 years	
Carmen Zamfir-Gilhase	Romania	Hurdling	2004	Stanozolol	2 years	
Ruddy Zang Milama	Gabon	Sprinting	2014		7 months	
Yuliya Zaripova	Russia	Steeplechase	2011	Biological passport abnormalities	2 years and 6 months	
Oksana Zelinskaya	Kazakhstan	Triple jump	1997	Ephedrine	Public warning and disqualification	
Olha Zemlyak	Ukraine	Sprinting	2009	Norandrosterone	2 years	
Zhang Qi	China	Shot put	2008	Anabolic agent	4 years	
Zhou Tianhua	China	Shot put	1993			
Zhou Wei	China	Sprinting	2000		2 years	
Zohar Zimro	Israel	Marathon	2012		Public reprimand	
Yevgeniya Zinurova	Russia	Middle distance	2010	Biological passport abnormalities	2 years	
Khalid Zoubaa	France	Long distance	2007	EPO	3 years	
Ellina Zvereva	Belarus	Discus throw	1992	Steroids		

== See also ==
- Doping at the Olympic Games
- List of doping cases in sport
- List of doping cases in cycling
- Sportspeople in doping cases by nationality
