= Mohamed El Hachimi =

Moroccan long-distance runner

Mohamed El-Hachimi
Personal information
- Nationality: Morocco
- Born: 5 September 1980 (age 46)

Sport
- Sport: Athletics
- Event: Long-distance running

Achievements and titles
- Personal bests: 5000 m: 13:36.94 (2008); 10,000 m: 27:34.29 (2008)

Mohamed El-Hachimi (Arabic: محمد الهاشمي born September 5, 1980) is a Moroccan long-distance runner. El-Hachimi represented Morocco at the 2008 Summer Olympics in Beijing, where he competed for the men's 10,000 metres, along with his teammate Abdellah Falil. He failed to finish the race.

== Doping bans ==
In 2012 El-Hachimi tested positive for the stimulant methylhexaneamine. He received a 6-month ban for the anti-doping rule violation. The ban ended 28 January 2013.

On 19 January 2014, at the cross country race Cross Ouest France Pays de la Loire’ at Le Mans, El-Hachimi tested positive for CERA (EPO). El-Hachimi claimed he hadn't taken part in the race, even though had collected his bib from the organizers and he had been present in the finish area after the race, and that the French Anti-Doping Agency thus had not had the rights to control him. He was first cleared by the French anti-doping authorities, but the decision was later overturned and he was handed a 6-year ban from sports. The ban ended 19 February 2021.
