= Abdelhadi Labäli =

Moroccan middle-distance runner

Personal information
- Nationality: Moroccan
- Born: 26 April 1993 (age 32)

Sport
- Sport: Track and field
- Event: 3000m

Abdelhadi Labäli (born 26 April 1993) is a Moroccan middle-distance runner. He competed in the 3000 metres event at the 2014 IAAF World Indoor Championships. In 2016 he was banned from competition for two years as a result of irregularities in his biological passport.
