= Athlete biological passport =

Electronic record for athletes

An athlete biological passport is an individual electronic record for professional athletes, in which profiles of biological markers of doping and results of doping tests are collated over a period of time. Doping violations can be detected by noting variances from an athlete's established levels outside permissible limits, rather than testing for and identifying illegal substances.

Although the terminology athlete passport is recent, the use of biological markers of doping has a long history in anti-doping. Testosterone/Epitestosterone Ratio (T/E) was possibly the first marker of doping that was used to detect a prohibited substance not based on its presence in urine or blood, but instead the induced deviations in biological parameters. The T/E has been used by sports authorities since the beginning of the 1980s to detect anabolic steroids in urine samples. A decade later, in 1997, markers of blood doping were introduced by some international federations, such as the Union Cycliste Internationale (UCI) and the Federation Internationale de Ski, to deter the abuse of recombinant erythropoietin (EPO) that was undetectable by direct means at that time.

In 2002 the concept of using biological markers to detect doping became known by the term "athlete passport". The advantages were listed in a science journal paper. and the terminology adopted by the World Anti-Doping agency.

While a new drug test must be developed and validated for each new drug, the advantage of the athlete passport is that it is based on the natural stability of the physiology of the human being. There can be a lag between the availability of a new drug and the development of an effective test. In contrast, the physiology of the human being remains the same through several generations and all biomarkers developed today in the athlete passport will remain valid for at least several decades. For example, the blood module of the passport is already sensitive today to any new future form of recombinant erythropoietin, as well as to any form of gene doping that will enhance oxygen transfer to the muscles. Also, while a negative drug test does not necessarily mean that the athlete did not dope, the athlete can present their passport at the beginning of a competition to attest that they will compete in their natural, unaltered condition.

The athlete passport was widely covered in the media when the blood module was established at the beginning of the 2008 racing season by the world cycling federation, the UCI. In May 2008 the UCI revealed that 23 riders were under suspicion of doping following the first phase of blood tests conducted under the new biological passport.

The blood module of the athlete passport aims to detect any form of blood doping, the steroid module any form of doping with anabolic steroid and the endocrine module any modification of the growth hormone/IGF-1 axis. Each of these modules are however at different steps of development, validation and application in sports.

== Athlete biological passport testing ==
According to the World Anti-Doping Agency, the athlete biological passport is administered to establish whether an athlete is manipulating their physiological variables without detecting a particular substance or method. The biological passport uses the standardized approach of urine sampling to determine steroid abuse. The objective of this testing is to identify athletes in a haematological module and a steroidal module.

The haematological module tests for certain markers in the body that identify the enhancement of oxygen transport. The specific markers the module tests for include haematocrit, haemoglobin, red blood cell count, percentage of reticulocytes, reticulocytes count, mean corpuscular volume, mean corpuscular haemoglobin, mean red cell distribution width, and immature reticulocyte fraction.

The steroidal module collects information on markers for steroid doping and aims to identify endogenous anabolic androgenic steroids. The specific markers the module tests for include testosterone, epitestosterone, the testosterone/epitestosterone ratio, androsterone, and etiocholanolone.

In the 2014 Prohibited Substances list, the World Anti-Doping Agency modified the definitions of exogenous and endogenous steroids that are tested in the steroidal module of the biological passport.

== Cycling ==
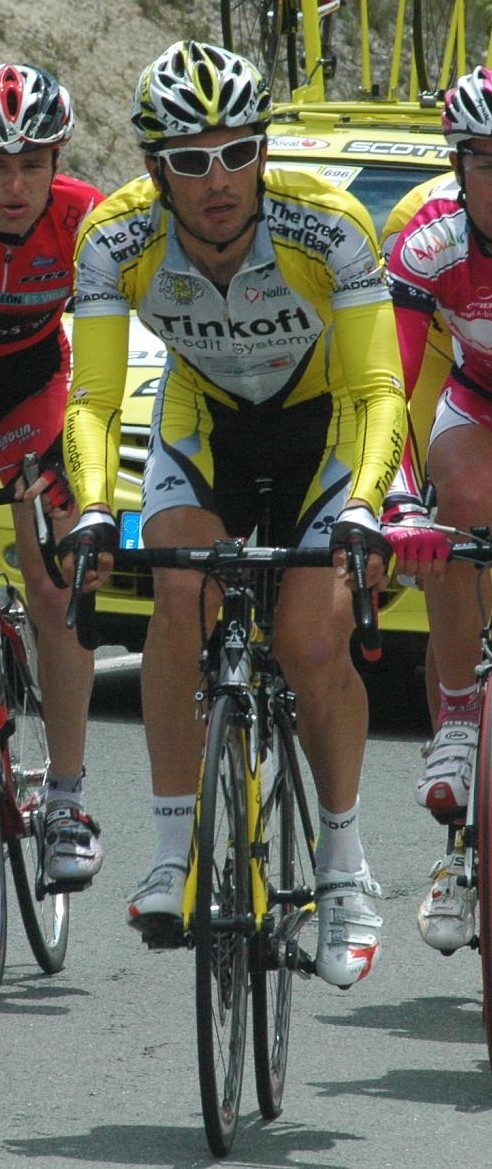
Ricardo Serrano was one of the five first riders that UCI opened a biological passport case against, in 2009.

=== Whereabouts rules ===
Under the new rules, registered riders have to give the Union Cycliste Internationale daily information about their location and provide a one-hour window for possible testing. They have to submit a form every quarter-year saying where they will be every day of the next quarter and they must notify the UCI if they change their whereabouts on any day. This means the whereabouts information provided in the whereabouts filings is accurate and sufficient in detail to enable any relevant Anti-Doping Organization to locate the riders for testing on any given day in that period of time.

=== Cyclists sanctioned on basis of biological passports ===
The biological passport programme has allowed the UCI to sanction riders for committing an anti-doping rule violation. Riders have also been targeted with further doping controls based on their biological passport.

Name	Team	Country	Event	Start of disqualification	Sanction	Sanction announced	Ineligibility starting	Ineligibility ending	Reference(s)
António Amorim		Portugal	Road racing	24 July 2010	2 years ineligibility	10 July 2013		14 April 2015	
Igor Astarloa	Team Milram	Spain	Road racing	15 Aug. 2009	2 years ineligibility	1 Dec. 2010	26 Nov. 2010	25 Nov. 2012	
Carlos Barredo	Quick-Step, Rabobank	Spain	Road racing	17 Oct. 2007 –24 Sept. 2011, only	2 years ineligibility	July 2014	18 Oct 2012	17 Oct 2014	
Leonardo Bertagnolli	Liquigas, Androni Giocattoli, Lampre–ISD	Italy	Road racing	1 Jan. 2003 –18 May 2011	2 years and 10 months ineligibility	July 2014		24 Nov. 2013	
Pietro Caucchioli	Crédit Agricole	Italy	Road racing	18 June 2009	2 years ineligibility	3 June 2010	18 June 2009	17 June 2011	
Francesco De Bonis	Gerolsteiner, Diquigiovanni–Androni	Italy	Road racing	18 June 2009	2 years ineligibility	May 2010	18 June 2009	17 June 2011	
Leif Hoste	Omega Pharma–Lotto	Belgium	Road racing		2 years ineligibility	29 Mar. 2013		29 Dec. 2015	
Rubén Lobato	Saunier Duval–Scott	Spain	Road racing	16 July 2010	2 years ineligibility	July 2010	16 July 2010	15 July 2012	
Denis Menchov	Rabobank, Team Katusha	Russia	Road racing	2009, 2010 & 2012 TdF, only	2 years ineligibility	July 2014	10 April 2014	9 April 2015	
Franco Pellizotti	Liquigas	Italy	Road racing	7 May 2009	2 years ineligibility	March 2011	3 May 2010	2 May 2012	
Sérgio Ribeiro		Portugal	Road racing		12 years ineligibility (2nd ARDV)			14 July 2025	
Ricardo Serrano	Tinkoff Credit Systems	Spain	Road racing	7 May 2009	2 years ineligibility	17 June 2010	7 May 2009	6 May 2011	
Jonathan Tiernan-Locke	Endura Racing/Team Sky	United Kingdom	Road racing	2012 Tour of Britain & 2012 UCI Worlds, only	2 years ineligibility	July 2014	31 Dec. 2013	31 Dec. 2015	
Tadej Valjavec	Ag2r–La Mondiale	Slovenia	Road racing	19 April –30 Sept. 2009, only	2 years ineligibility	April 2011	20 Jan. 2011	19 Jan. 2013	

During the first three years of UCI's bio passport program 26 riders were found positive for EPO. In 20 out of the 26 cases, it was the abnormal blood profile which raised suspicions leading to a targeted doping test.

- Manuel Beltrán (Liquigas) tested positive for EPO at the 2008 Tour de France in a targeted test after anomalies appeared in a blood sample taken at the start of the Tour. The pre Tour blood samples were collected by the French Anti-doping Agency (AFLD) and the results from the testings were submitted to the UCI to form part of their database of profiles for their biological passport programme.
- Gabriele Bosisio (LPR Brakes-Ballan) tested positive for EPO in an out-of-competition control in September 2010, after having been targeted under the biological passport programme. He received a two-year sanction.
- Antonio Colom (Team Katusha) tested positive for EPO in an out-of-competition control in April 2009, after having been targeted under the biological passport programme. He received a two-year sanction.
- Thomas Dekker (Rabobank) tested positive for EPO in a retroactive test carried out on a urine sample taken in December 2007. Dekker's hematological profile led the UCI to review the EPO analyses for urine samples conducted since the introduction of the biological passport programme.
- Danilo Di Luca (LPR Brakes-Ballan) tested positive for CERA twice during the 2009 Giro d'Italia after being targeted under the biological passport programme.
- Alberto Fernández de la Puebla (Fuji–Servetto) tested positive for EPO in an out-of-competition control in October 2009, after having been targeted under the biological passport programme. He received a two-year sanction.
- David George (MTB) tested positive for EPO in an out-of-competition control 29 August 2012, after having been targeted under the biological passport programme of the South African Institute for Drug-Free Sport (the South African national Anti-doping agency). He admitted to having used EPO and received a two-year sanction.
- Massimo Giunti (Androni Giocattoli) tested positive for EPO in an out-of-competition control in February 2010, after having been targeted under the biological passport programme. He received a two-year sanction.
- Eddy Ratti (De Rosa-Stac Plastic) tested positive for EPO in an out-of-competition control in January 2010, after having been targeted under the biological passport programme. He received a two-year sanction.
- Manuel Vázquez Hueso (Andalucía-Cajasur) tested positive for EPO in an out-of-competition control in March 2010, after having been targeted under the biological passport programme. He received a two-year sanction.

== Athletics ==
The International Association of Athletics Federations, now known as World Athletics, introduced their Athletes Biological Passport programme in 2009, and announced the first sanction under the passport in May 2012. The Portuguese marathon runner Hélder Ornelas became the first track and field athlete to get suspended for doping based on the biological passport. He received a four-year suspension in May 2012.

=== Track and field athletes sanctioned on basis of biological passports ===
Name		Country	Event	Date of infraction/ Start of disqualification	Sanction	Sanction announced	Ineligibility starting	Ineligibility ending	Reference(s)
Inga Abitova	F	Russia	Marathon	10 Oct. 2009	2 years ineligibility	7 Nov. 2012	11 Oct 2012	10 Oct. 2014	
Anna Alminova	F	Russia	1500 m	16 Feb. 2009	2 years and 6 months ineligibility	30 July 2014	16 Dec. 2011	15 May 2014	
Aslı Çakır Alptekin	F	Turkey	1500 m	29 July 2010	8 years ineligibility (2nd ADRV)	17 Aug. 2015	10 Jan. 2013	9 Jan. 2021	
Elena Arzhakova	F	Russia	800 m, 1500 m	12 July 2011	2 years ineligibility	30 April 2013	29 Jan. 2013	28 Jan. 2015	
Ahmed Baday	M	Morocco	Long-distance	26 March 2010	2 years ineligibility	6 March 2015	31 Dec. 2014	30 Dec. 2016	
Sergey Bakulin	M	Russia	Race walking	25 Jan. 2011	3 years and 2 months ineligibility	20 Jan. 2015	24 Dec. 2012		
Yassine Bensghir	M	Morocco	Middle-distance	7 June 2014	4 years ineligibility	25 July 2016	12 April. 2016	11 April 2020	
Alemitu Bekele	F	Turkey	5000 m	17 Aug. 2009	2 years and 9 months ineligibility (Reduced from 4 years)	16 Jan. 2013	3 March 2012	2 Jan. 2015	
Petr Bogatyrev	M	Russia	Race walking	12 July 2011	2 years ineligibility	26 March 2014	16 Oct. 2013	15 Oct. 2015	
Valeriy Borchin	M	Russia	Race walking	14 Aug. 2009	8 years ineligibility	20 Jan. 2015	15 Oct. 2012		
Abderrahime Bouramdane	M	Morocco	Marathon	14 March 2011	2 years ineligibility	28 Oct. 2015	2 Oct. 2015	1 Oct. 2017	
Yolanda Caballero	F	Colombia	Middle-/long-distance	24 Oct. 2011	4 years ineligibility	25 May. 2016	28 April. 2014	27 April 2018	
Hafid Chani	M	Morocco	Long-distance	19 March 2011	4 years ineligibility	26 June 2015	11 March 2015	10 March 2019	
Bahar Doğan	F	Turkey	Marathon	3 June 2011	2 years and 6 months ineligibility	25 Oct. 2015	31 March 2015	30 Sept. 2017	
Marta Dominguez	F	Spain	Steeplechase	5 Aug. 2009	3 years ineligibility	19 Nov. 2015	24 June 2015	12 Oct. 2017	
Hamza Driouch	M	Qatar	800 m, 1500 m.	2 Aug. 2012	2 years ineligibility	24 Feb. 2015	31 Dec. 2014	30 Dec. 2016	
Aliaksandra Dublia	F	Belarus	Marathon	11 Oct. 2013	2 years ineligibility	27 Jan. 2016	28 Sept. 2015	27 Sept. 2017	
Stanislav Emelyanov	M	Russia	Race walking	26 July 2010	2 years ineligibility	28 July 2014	15 Dec. 2012	14 Dec. 2014	
Rkia El Moukim	M	Morocco	Middle-/long-distance	19 March 2011	2 years ineligibility	19 Feb. 2016	19 Feb. 2016	18 Feb. 2018	
Najim El Qady	M	Morocco	Long-distance	19 March 2011	2 years ineligibility	24 June 2016	8 June. 2016	7 June 2018	
Meryem Erdoğan	F	Turkey	Long-distance	27 July 2010	2 years ineligibility	25 July 2012		14 Feb. 2014	
Miguel Ángel Gamonal	M	Spain	Half marathon		3 years ineligibility (2nd ADRV)	28 Oct. 2015	26 Oct. 2015	25 Oct. 2018	
Abderrahim Goumri	M	Morocco	Marathon	22 April 2009	4 years ineligibility	25 July 2012		14 March 2016 (Note: A. Goumri died in a car crash in January 2013)	
Yelizaveta Grechishnikova	F	Russia	5000 m	18 Aug. 2009	2 years ineligibility	3 Dec. 2013	16 Oct. 2013	15 Oct. 2015	
Lidiya Grigoryeva	F	Russia	Long-distance	17 Feb. 2009	2 years and 6 months ineligibility	24 June 2016	16 Feb. 2016	15 Aug. 2018	
Halima Hachlaf	F	Morocco	800 m.	14 Oct. 2013	4 years ineligibility	24 April 2014	19 Dec. 2013	18 Dec. 2017	
Tetyana Hamera-Shmyrko	F	Ukraine	Marathon	26 Aug. 2011	4 years ineligibility	20 Nov. 2015	30 Sept. 2015	29 Sept. 2019	
Hussain Al-Hamdah	M	Saudi Arabia	5000 m.	26 March 2009	2 years and 6 months ineligibility	25 Feb. 2015	15 Feb. 2013	14 Aug. 2015	
Ekaterina Ishova (née Gorbunova)	F	Russia	1500 m, 3000 m, 5000 m.	12. July 2011	2 years ineligibility	3 Dec. 2013	23 Oct. 2013	22 Oct. 2015	
Stéphane Joly	M	Switzerland	Cross country	14 Oct. 2010	2 years ineligibility	5 June 2013	29 April 2013	28 April 2015	
Vladimir Kanaykin	M	Russia	Race walking	25 January 2011	8 years	20 Jan. 2015	17 Dec. 2012	16 Dec. 2020	
Olga Kaniskina	F	Russia	Race walking	15 August 2009	3 years and 2 months ineligibility	20 Jan. 2015	15 Oct. 2012		
Natallia Kareiva	F	Belarus	1500 m.	28 July 2010	2 years ineligibility	29 Sept. 2014	22 Aug. 2014	21 Aug. 2016	
Ümmü Kiraz	F	Turkey	Marathon	3 June 2011	2 years and 6 months ineligibility	25 Oct. 2015	31 March 2015	30 Sept. 2017	
Svetlana Kireyeva	F	Russia	Long-distance	26 June 2012	2 years ineligibility	27 Jan. 2016	4 June 2015	3 June 2017	
Sergey Kirdyapkin	M	Russia	Race walking	20 August 2009	3 years and 2 months ineligibility	20 Jan. 2015	15 Oct. 2012		
Svetlana Klyuka	F	Russia	800 m.	15 Aug. 2009	2 years ineligibility	25 July 2012		9 Feb. 2014	
Eirini Kokkinariou	F	Greece	Steeplechase	2 July 2009	4 years ineligibility	25 July 2012	27 Oct. 2011	26 Oct. 2015	
Mariya Konovalova	F	Russia	Marathon	Aug. 2009	2 years ineligibility	5 Nov. 2015	27 Oct. 2015	26 Oct. 2017	
Yekaterina Kostetskaya	F	Russia	800 m, 1500 m.	30 Aug. 2011	2 years ineligibility	28 July 2014	21 Jan. 2013	20 Jan. 2015	
Alena Kudashkina	F	Russia	Long-distance	9 July 2012	2 years and 6 months ineligibility	24 June 2016	23 Sept. 2015	22 March 2018	
Abdelhadi Labäli	M	Morocco	Middle-distance	9 July 2012	2 years ineligibility	25 May. 2016	27 April. 2016	26 April 2018	
Mikhail Lemaev	M	Russia	Marathon	20 Aug. 2009	2 years ineligibility	26 Feb. 2013	30 Jan. 2013	29 Jan. 2015	
Anna Lukyanova	F	Russia	Race walking	19 July 2010	2 years ineligibility	19 Feb. 2016	26 Nov. 2015	25 Nov. 2017	
Irina Maracheva	F	Russia	800 m.	26 June 2012	2 years ineligibility	19 Feb. 2016	23 Jan. 2015	22 Jan. 2017	
Ildar Minshin	M	Russia	Steeplechase	15 Aug. 2009	2 years ineligibility	21 Sept. 2016	25 Aug. 2016	24 Aug. 2018	
Anna Mishchenko	F	Ukraine	800 m./1500m./3000 m.	28 June 2012	2 years ineligibility	19 Feb. 2016	18 Aug. 2015	17 Aug. 2017	
Tatyana Mineeva	F	Russia	Race walking	12 Nov. 2011	2 years ineligibility	14 Dec. 2012		16 Nov. 2014	
Marco Morgado	M	Portugal	Cross country running	29 Oct. 2011	6 years ineligibility	25 Feb. 2014	24 Feb. 2013	24 Feb. 2019	
Sergey Morozov	M	Russia	Race walking	25 Feb. 2011	Life ban	18 Dec. 2012		Life ban (2nd ARDV)	
Semiha Mutlu	F	Turkey	Race walking	20 Aug. 2011	2 years and 6 months ineligibility	25 Oct. 2015	3 March 2015	2 Sept. 2017	
Maria Nikolaeva	F	Russia	400 m./800 m.	18 Feb. 2015	4 years ineligibility	19 Feb. 2016	1 Oct. 2015	30 Sept. 2019	
Ilja Nikolajev	M	Estonia	Marathon	16 April 2013	2 years ineligibility	12 May 2015	3 Feb. 2015	2 Feb. 2017	
Maksym Cerrone Obrubanskyy	M	Italy	1500 m, 3000 m. 5000 m.	17 Feb. 2013	4 years ineligibility	25 Feb. 2014	30 May 2013	29 May 2017	
Nina Okhotnikova	F	Russia	Race walking	21 June 2011 –17 Nov. 2011	2 years ineligibility	17 March 2015	22 Jan. 2015	21 Jan. 2017	
Hélder Ornelas	M	Portugal	Marathon	8 March 2010	4 years ineligibility	2 May 2012		12 Jan. 2016	
Hanane Ouhaddou	F	Morocco	Steeplechase	14 August 2009	2 years ineligibility			7 June 2014	
Tetiana Petlyuk	F	Ukraine	800 m.	18 Aug. 2009	2 years ineligibility	5 April 2013		19 Feb. 2015	
Meliz Redif	F	Turkey	400 m.	26 June 2012	3 years ineligibility	25 Oct. 2015	31 March 2015	30 March 2018	
José Rocha	M	Portugal	Long-distance	11 Dec. 2010	2 years ineligibility	28 Feb. 2014	25 March 2013	24 March 2015	
Yuliya Ruban	F	Ukraine	Marathon	8 March 2012	2 years ineligibility	29 May 2015	25 Feb. 2015	24 Feb. 2017	
Yuliya Rusanova	F	Russia	800 m.	3 March 2011	2 years ineligibility	26 Feb. 2013	28 Jan. 2013	27 Jan. 2015	
Andrey Ruzavin	M	Russia	Race walking	18 Dec. 2011 –18 Feb. 2012; 13 Sept. 2013 –13 Nov 2013	2 years and 6 months ineligibility	17 March 2015	9 Oct. 2014	8 April 2017	
Pınar Saka	F	Turkey	400 m.	18 June 2010	3 years ineligibility	28 Jan. 2014	3 June 2013	2 June 2016	
Mohammed Shaween	M	Saudi Arabia	1500 m.	12 June 2011	3 years ineligibility	28 July 2014	13 Feb. 2013	12 Feb. 2016	
Anzhelika Shevchenko	F	Ukraine	1500 m.	2 July 2011	2 years ineligibility	5 April 2013		17 Feb. 2015	
Liliya Shobukhova	F	Russia	Marathon	9 Oct. 2009	2 years and 7 months (Reduced from 3 years and 2 months by WADA after first being extended from 2 years by CAS)	29 April 2014	22 Jan. 2013	23 Aug. 2015	
Fernando Silva	M	Portugal	Cross country running	29 Oct. 2011	8 years ineligibility	26 Feb. 2014	24 Sept. 2013	23 Sept. 2021	
Svitlana Shmidt	F	Ukraine	Middle-distance	8 March 2012	4 years ineligibility	30 April 2015	17 March 2015	16 March 2019	
Olesya Syreva	F	Russia	1500 m, 3000 m.	3 March 2011	2 years ineligibility	26 Feb. 2013	1 Feb. 2013	31 Jan. 2015	
Irina Timofeyeva	F	Russia	Marathon	10 Oct. 2009	2 years ineligibility	21 Sept. 2016	6 Sept. 2016	5 Sept. 2018	
Wang Jiali	F	China	Marathon	29 May 2012	2 years ineligibility	25 Feb. 2014	26 Feb. 2013	25 Feb. 2015	
Nevin Yanit	F	Turkey	Sprinting, hurdling	28 June 2012	3 years ineligibility	6 March 2015	6 March 2013	5 March 2016	
Igor Yerokhin	M	Russia	Race walking	25 Feb. 2011	Life ban	24 Sept. 2013		Life ban (2nd ARDV)	
Lyudmyla Yosypenko	F	Ukraine	Heptathlon	25 Aug. 2011	4 years ineligibility	24 Sept. 2013	27 March 2013	26 March 2017	
Nailiya Yulamanova	F	Russia	Marathon		2 years ineligibility	25 July 2012		9 Feb. 2014	
Yuliya Zaripova	F	Russia	Steeplechase	20 July 2011	2 years and 6 months ineligibility	30 Jan. 2015	25 July 2013		
Yevgeniya Zinurova	F	Russia	800 m.	6 March 2010	2 years ineligibility	25 July 2012		12 Sept. 2013	

In March 2014, the Spanish athletics federation cleared Marta Dominguez in a bio passport case. El País reported that IAAF were going to take the case to CAS. In February 2014, IAAF announced they would appeal Aslı Çakır Alptekin's ABP-related doping case to CAS after the Turkish federation had cleared her. IAAF also suspended her provisionally. An IAAF spokesperson in January 2015 confirmed that Russian race walker Sergey Bakulin was provisionally suspended since December 2012 in an ABP related doping case. IAAF otherwise doesn't publicly announce provisional suspensions. In February 2015 Turkish press reported that Ümmü Kiraz, Bahar Doğan, Semiha Mutlu and Meliz Redif were under investigation in bio passport cases.

== Triathlon ==
In 2012 USADA sanctioned the American triathlete Mark Fretta "after variations in his individual longitudinal blood profile as well as other documentary evidence indicated the use of Erythropoiesis-Stimulating Agents". Fretta received a four-year ban, and his results from 18 August 2010 onwards were annulled.

== Football (soccer) ==
In 2014, the biological passport was introduced in the 2014 FIFA World Cup; blood and urine samples from all players before the competition and from two players per team and per match were analysed by the Swiss Laboratory for Doping Analyses.
