= Semiha Mutlu =

Turkish racewalker (born 1987)

Personal information
- Nationality: Turkey
- Born: March 5, 1987 (age 39) Koyulhisar, Sivas Province, Turkey
- Height: 168 cm (5 ft 6 in)
- Weight: 55 kg (121 lb)

Sport
- Sport: Race walker
- Club: İzmir Büyükşehir Belediyespor
- Coached by: Zeynep Karabağlı

Achievements and titles
- Personal bests: 10km walk: 49:43; 20km walk: 1:37:06

Semiha Mutlu (born March 5, 1987, in Koyulhisar, Sivas Province, Turkey) is a Turkish female racewalker.

== Career ==
She began racewalking at the age of 18, and is currently a member of the İzmir Büyükşehir Belediyespor. Mutlu is the holder of the national record in 20000m walk (track) with 1:44.38. She is qualified to represent Turkey in the 20km walk event at the⋅2012 Olympics in London.

== Doping violations ==
In 2015 Mutlu was banned from sport for 30 months after abnormal deviations in her biological passport profile was found.

In 2019, Mutlu received a second doping violation and a resulting eight year ban from competition.

== Personal bests ==
According to All Athletics Database, her personal bests are:

- 10 km walk: 49:43 - Izmir (TUR), 20.06.2010
- 20 km walk: 1:37:06 - Dudince (SVK), 26.03.2011

== See also ==
- Turkish women in sports
