= Athletics at the 1980 Summer Olympics – Women's shot put =

Women's shot put at the Games of the XXII Olympiad
- Venue: Lenin Central Stadium
- Date: 24 July
- Competitors: 14 from 8 nations
- Winning distance: 22.41 OR

Medalists
| 1st place, gold medalist(s) | | Ilona Slupianek; East Germany |
| 2nd place, silver medalist(s) | | Svetlana Krachevskaia; Soviet Union |
| 3rd place, bronze medalist(s) | | Margitta Pufe; East Germany |

The women's shot put event at the 1980 Summer Olympics in Moscow, Soviet Union had an entry list of 14 competitors. The final was held on Thursday 24 July 1980. Slupianek scored a distance of 21.85.

== Medalists ==
| Gold | Ilona Slupianek; East Germany |
| Silver | Svetlana Krachevskaia; Soviet Union |
| Bronze | Margitta Pufe; East Germany |

== Abbreviations ==
- All results shown are in metres

| Q | automatic qualification |
| q | qualification by rank |
| DNS | did not start |
| NM | no mark |
| OR | olympic record |
| WR | world record |
| AR | area record |
| NR | national record |
| PB | personal best |
| SB | season best |

== Records ==
Standing records prior to the 1980 Summer Olympics
| World Record | Ilona Slupianek (GDR) | 22.45 m | May 10, 1980 | Potsdam, East Germany |
| Olympic Record | Ivanka Khristova (BUL) | 21.16 m | July 31, 1976 | Montreal, Canada |
Broken records during the 1980 Summer Olympics
| Olympic Record | Margitta Pufe (GDR) | 21.20 m | July 24, 1980 | Moscow, Soviet Union |
| Olympic Record | Ilona Slupianek (GDR) | 22.41 m | July 24, 1980 | Moscow, Soviet Union |

== Final ==
| Rank | Athlete | Attempts | | | | | | Distance | Note |
| Rank | Athlete | 1 | 2 | 3 | 4 | 5 | 6 | Distance | Note |
|---|---|---|---|---|---|---|---|---|---|
| 1st place, gold medalist(s) | Ilona Slupianek (GDR) | 22.41 | 21.81 | 21.42 | 21.60 | 22.00 | 21.85 | 22.41 m | OR |
| 2nd place, silver medalist(s) | Svetlana Krachevskaya (URS) | 20.00 | 20.67 | 21.42 | X | 21.03 | X | 21.42 m | |
| 3rd place, bronze medalist(s) | Margitta Pufe (GDR) | 21.20 | 21.07 | 20.42 | 20.72 | 20.05 | 20.36 | 21.20 m | |
| 4 | Nunu Abashidze (URS) | 20.74 | X | X | X | 20.02 | 21.15 | 21.15 m | |
| 5 | Verzhinia Veselinova (BUL) | 20.72 | 19.75 | 20.55 | 20.37 | X | X | 20.72 m | |
| 6 | Elena Stoyanova (BUL) | 20.22 | 19.80 | 19.56 | 19.83 | 20.00 | 20.18 | 20.22 m | |
| 7 | Natalya Akhrimenko (URS) | 19.64 | 19.63 | 19.74 | X | X | 19.28 | 19.74 m | |
| 8 | Ines Reichenbach (GDR) | 19.19 | 19.66 | 19.49 | 19.03 | 19.65 | 19.63 | 19.66 m | |
| 9 | María Elena Sarría (CUB) | 19.20 | 19.37 | 18.91 | | | | 19.37 m | |
| 10 | Zdena Bartoňová (TCH) | 17.43 | 18.40 | X | | | | 18.40 m | |
| 11 | Ivanka Petrova (BUL) | 18.34 | X | 18.28 | | | | 18.34 m | |
| 12 | Gael Mulhall (AUS) | 17.45 | X | 18.00 | | | | 18.00 m | |
| 13 | Angela Littlewood (GBR) | 16.14 | 16.35 | 17.53 | | | | 17.53 m | |
| 14 | Cinzia Petrucci (ITA) | 17.17 | 17.00 | 17.27 | | | | 17.27 m | |

== See also ==
- 1978 Women's European Championships Shot Put (Prague)
- 1982 Women's European Championships Shot Put (Athens)
- 1983 Women's World Championships Shot Put (Helsinki)
- 1986 Women's European Championships Shot Put (Stuttgart)
- 1987 Women's World Championships Shot Put (Rome)
