= 1982 in the sport of athletics =

1982 in athletics
- Major world events: World Championship in Athletics

This article contains an overview of the year 1982 in athletics.

== International Events ==
- African Championships
- Asian Games
- Central American and Caribbean Championships
- Commonwealth Games
- European Championships
- European Indoor Championships
- World Cross Country Championships

== World records ==
=== Men ===
EVENT	ATHLETE	MARK	DATE	VENUE
5000m	David Moorcroft (GBR)	13:00:41	July 7	Oslo, Norway
Half Marathon	Michael Musyoki (KEN)	1:01:36	September 19	Philadelphia, United States
Hammer	Sergey Litvinov (URS)	83.98m	June 4	Moscow, Soviet Union
Decathlon	Daley Thompson (GBR)	8730	May 23	Götzis, Austria
Decathlon	Jürgen Hingsen (FRG)	8741	August 15	Athens, Greece
Decathlon	Daley Thompson (GBR)	8774	September 8	Athens, Greece

=== Women ===
EVENT	ATHLETE	MARK	DATE	VENUE
400 metres	Marita Koch (GDR)	48.16	September 8	Athens, Greece
Mile	Mary Slaney (USA)	4:18.08	July 9	Paris, France
Mile	Maricica Puică (ROU)	4:17.44	September 16	Rieti, Italy
3,000 metres	Svetlana Ulmasova (URS)	8:26.78	July 25	Kiev, Soviet Union
5,000 metres	Anne Audain (NZL)	15:13.22	March 17	Auckland, New Zealand
5,000 metres	Mary Slaney (USA)	15:08.26	June 5	Eugene, Oregon, United States
10,000 metres	Mary Slaney (USA)	31:35.3	July 16	Eugene, Oregon, United States
4 × 400 m Relay	East Germany (GDR) • Kirsten Emmelmann • Sabine Busch • Dagmar Neubauer • Marita Koch	3:19.04	September 11	Athens, Greece
Half Marathon	Grete Waitz (NOR)	1:09:57	May 15	Gothenburg, Sweden
High jump	Ulrike Meyfarth (FRG)	2.02	September 8	Athens, Greece
Long jump	Anisoara Cusmir (ROM)	7.15	August 1	Bucharest, Romania
Long jump	Valeria Ionescu (ROM)	7.20	August 1	Bucharest, Romania
Javelin throw	Tiina Lillak (FIN)	72.40	July 29	Helsinki, Finland
Javelin throw	Sofia Sakorafa (GRE)	74.20	September 26	Khania, Greece
Heptathlon	Ramona Neubert (GDR)	6845	June 20	Halle, East Germany

- Marlies Göhr (GDR) equals her own world record in the women's 100 metres, clocking 10.88 seconds on 1982-07-06 at a meet in Karl-Marx-Stadt.

== Men's Best Year Performers ==
=== 100 metres ===
RANK	1982 WORLD BEST PERFORMERS	TIME
1.	Carl Lewis (USA)	10.00
2.	Stanley Floyd (USA)	10.03
3.	Calvin Smith (USA)	10.05
4.	Willie Gault (USA)	10.10
5.	Mike Miller (USA)	10.11

=== 200 metres ===
RANK	1982 WORLD BEST PERFORMERS	TIME
1.	Mike Miller (USA)	20.15
2.	Phil Epps (USA)	20.19
3.	Tony Sharpe (CAN)	20.22
4.	James Butler (USA)	20.23
5=	Carl Lewis (USA)	20.27
5=	Jeff Phillips (USA)	20.27

=== 400 metres ===
RANK	1982 WORLD BEST PERFORMERS	TIME
1.	Sunder Nix (USA)	44.68
2.	Darrell Robinson (USA)	44.69
—	Bert Cameron (JAM)	44.69
4.	Hartmut Weber (FRG)	44.72
5.	Hassan El Kashief (SUD)	44.76

=== 800 metres ===
RANK	1982 WORLD BEST PERFORMERS	TIME
1.	Steve Cram (GBR)	1:44.45
2.	Sebastian Coe (GBR)	1:44.48
3.	Rob Druppers (NED)	1:44.54
4.	Garry Cook (GBR)	1:44.71
5.	James Robinson (USA)	1:44.72

=== 1,500 metres ===
RANK	1982 WORLD BEST PERFORMERS	TIME
1.	Sydney Maree (USA)	3:32.12
2.	Steve Scott (USA)	3:32.33
3.	Thomas Wessinghage (FRG)	3:32.85
4.	José Manuel Abascal (ESP)	3:33.12
5.	Ray Flynn (IRL)	3:33.5

=== Mile ===
RANK	1982 WORLD BEST PERFORMERS	TIME
1.	Steve Scott (USA)	3:47.69
2.	Sydney Maree (USA)	3:48.85
3.	John Walker (NZL)	3:49.08
4.	David Moorcroft (GBR)	3:49.34
5.	Ray Flynn (IRL)	3:49.77

=== 3,000 metres ===
RANK	1982 WORLD BEST PERFORMERS	TIME
1.	David Moorcroft (GBR)	7:32.79
2.	Sydney Maree (USA)	7:33.37
3.	John Walker (NZL)	7:37.49
4.	Peter Koech (KEN)	7:39.09
5.	Thomas Wessinghage (FRG)	7:39.34

=== 5,000 metres ===
RANK	1982 WORLD BEST PERFORMERS	TIME
1.	David Moorcroft (GBR)	13:00.41
2.	Wodajo Bulti (ETH)	13:07.29
3.	António Leitão (POR)	13:07.70
4.	Henry Rono (KEN)	13:08.97
5.	Peter Koech (KEN)	13:09.50

=== 10,000 metres ===
RANK	1982 WORLD BEST PERFORMERS	TIME
1.	Fernando Mamede (POR)	27:22.95
2.	Carlos Lopes (POR)	27:24.39
3.	Alberto Salazar (USA)	27:25.61
4.	Alex Hagelsteens (BEL)	27:26.95
5.	Henry Rono (KEN)	27:28.67

=== Half Marathon ===
RANK	1982 WORLD BEST PERFORMERS	TIME
1.	Michael Musyoki (KEN)	1:01:36 WR

=== 110m Hurdles ===
RANK	1982 WORLD BEST PERFORMERS	TIME
1.	Greg Foster (USA)	13.22
2.	Willie Gault (USA)	13.26
3.	Sam Turner (USA)	13.31
4.	Alejandro Casañas (CUB)	13.36
5.	Mark McKoy (CAN)	13.37

=== 400m Hurdles ===
RANK	1982 WORLD BEST PERFORMERS	TIME
1.	Harald Schmid (FRG)	47.48
2.	David Patrick (USA)	48.44
—	David Lee (USA)	48.44
4.	Andre Phillips (USA)	48.45
5.	Larry Cowling (USA)	48.46

=== 3,000m Steeplechase ===
RANK	1982 WORLD BEST PERFORMERS	TIME
1.	Henry Marsh (USA)	8:16.17
2.	Patriz Ilg (FRG)	8:17.04
3.	Wolfgang Konrad (AUT)	8:17.22
4.	Bogusław Mamiński (POL)	8:17.41
5.	Colin Reitz (GBR)	8:18.80

=== High Jump ===
RANK	1982 WORLD BEST PERFORMERS	HEIGHT
1.	Zhu Jianhua (CHN)	2.33
2.	Gennadiy Byelkov (URS)	2.32
—	Milton Ottey (CAN)	2.32
—	Del Davis (USA)	2.32
5.	Steven Wray (BAH)	2.31

=== Long Jump ===
RANK	1982 WORLD BEST PERFORMERS	DISTANCE
1.	Carl Lewis (USA)	8.76
2.	Larry Myricks (USA)	8.56
3.	Lutz Dombrowski (GDR)	8.30
4.	Vance Johnson (USA)	8.21
5.	László Szalma (HUN)	8.20
—	Viktor Belskiy (URS)	8.20

=== Triple Jump ===
RANK	1982 WORLD BEST PERFORMERS	DISTANCE
1.	Keith Connor (GBR)	17.57
2.	Ken Lorraway (AUS)	17.46
3.	Gennadiy Valyukevich (URS)	17.42
4.	Aleksandr Beskrovniy (URS)	17.37
5.	Willie Banks (USA)	17.36

=== Discus ===
RANK	1982 WORLD BEST PERFORMERS	DISTANCE
1.	Luis Delís (CUB)	70.58
2.	Art Burns (USA)	69.96
3.	Georgiy Kolnootchenko (URS)	69.44
4.	Yuriy Dumchev (URS)	69.16
5.	Imrich Bugár (TCH)	68.60

=== Hammer ===
RANK	1982 WORLD BEST PERFORMERS	DISTANCE
1.	Sergey Litvinov (URS)	83.98
2.	Igor Nikulin (URS)	83.54
3.	Yuriy Syedikh (URS)	81.66
4.	Yuriy Tarasyuk (URS)	80.72
5.	Karl-Hans Riehm (FRG)	79.48

=== Shot Put ===
RANK	1982 WORLD BEST PERFORMERS	DISTANCE
1.	Dave Laut (USA)	22.02
2.	Udo Beyer (GDR)	21.94
3.	Remigius Machura (TCH)	21.74
4.	Janis Bojars (URS)	21.31
5.	Kevin Akins (USA)	21.27

=== Pole Vault ===
RANK	1982 WORLD BEST PERFORMERS	HEIGHT
1.	Dave Volz (USA)	5.75
—	Jean-Michel Bellot (FRA)	5.75
3.	Billy Olson (USA)	5.72
—	Dan Ripley (USA)	5.72
5.	Larry Jessee (USA)	5.71

=== Javelin (old design) ===
RANK	1982 WORLD BEST PERFORMERS	DISTANCE
1.	Bob Roggy (USA)	95.80
2.	Detlef Michel (GDR)	94.52
3.	Uwe Hohn (GDR)	91.34
4.	Dainis Kula (URS)	90.96
5.	Heino Puuste (URS)	90.72

=== Decathlon ===
RANK	1982 WORLD BEST PERFORMERS	POINTS
1.	Daley Thompson (GBR)	8774
2.	Jürgen Hingsen (FRG)	8741
3.	Konstantin Akhapkin (URS)	8485
4.	Siegfried Stark (GDR)	8472
5.	Torsten Voss (FRG)	8397

== Women's Best Year Performers ==
=== 100 metres ===
RANK	1982 WORLD BEST PERFORMERS	TIME
1.	Marlies Göhr (GDR)	10.88
2.	Evelyn Ashford (USA)	10.93
3.	Bärbel Wöckel (GDR)	10.95
4.	Angella Taylor (CAN)	11.00
5.	Marita Koch (GDR)	11.01

=== 200 metres ===
RANK	1982 WORLD BEST PERFORMERS	TIME
1.	Marita Koch (GDR)	21.76
2.	Bärbel Wöckel (GDR)	22.04
3.	Evelyn Ashford (USA)	22.10
4.	Kathy Smallwood (GBR)	22.13
5.	Merlene Ottey (JAM)	22.17

=== 400 metres ===
RANK	1982 WORLD BEST PERFORMERS	TIME
1.	Marita Koch (GDR)	48.16
2.	Jarmila Kratochvílová (TCH)	48.85
3.	Bärbel Wöckel (GDR)	49.56
4.	Tatána Kocembová (TCH)	50.41
5.	Kathy Smallwood (GBR)	50.46

=== 800 metres ===
RANK	1982 WORLD BEST PERFORMERS	TIME
1.	Doina Melinte (ROU)	1:55.05
2.	Olga Mineyeva (URS)	1:55.41
3.	Lyudmila Veselkova (URS)	1:55.96
4.	Ravilya Agletdinova (URS)	1:56.1
5.	Tatyana Mishkel (URS)	1:56.2

=== 1,500 metres ===
RANK	1982 WORLD BEST PERFORMERS	TIME
1.	Olga Dvirna (URS)	3:54.23
2.	Zamira Zaytseva (URS)	3:56.14
3.	Tatyana Pozdnyakova (URS)	3:56.50
4.	Svetlana Guskova (URS)	3:57.05
5.	Maricica Puică (ROU)	3:57.48

=== Mile ===
RANK	1982 WORLD BEST PERFORMERS	TIME
1.	Maricica Puică (ROU)	4:17.44
2.	Mary Decker-Tabb (USA)	4:18.08
3.	Vesela Yatzinska (BUL)	4:21.52
4.	Vanya Stoyanova (BUL)	4:21.78
5.	Tamara Sorokina (URS)	4:21.89

=== 3,000 metres ===
RANK	1982 WORLD BEST PERFORMERS	TIME
1.	Svetlana Ulmasova (URS)	8:26.78
2.	Svetlana Guskova (URS)	8:29.36
3.	Mary Decker-Tabb (USA)	8:29.71
4.	Maricica Puică (ROU)	8:31.67
5.	Galina Zakharova (URS)	8:33.40

=== 5,000 metres ===
RANK	1982 WORLD BEST PERFORMERS	TIME
1.	Mary Decker-Tabb (USA)	15:08.26
2.	Grete Waitz (NOR)	15:08.80
3.	Irina Bondarchuk (URS)	15:12.62
4.	Anne Audain (NZL)	15:13.22
5.	Charlotte Teske (FRG)	15:19.54

=== 10,000 metres ===
RANK	1982 WORLD BEST PERFORMERS	TIME
1.	Mary Decker-Tabb (USA)	31:35.3
2.	Anna Domoradskaya (URS)	31:48.23
3.	Raysa Sadreydinova (URS)	31:55.02
4.	Galina Zakharova (URS)	31:57.0
5.	Lyudmila Baranova (URS)	32:04.88

=== Half Marathon ===
RANK	1982 WORLD BEST PERFORMERS	TIME
1.	Grete Waitz (NOR)	1:09:57

=== 100m Hurdles ===
RANK	1982 WORLD BEST PERFORMERS	TIME
1.	Yordanka Donkova (BUL)	12.44
2.	Lucyna Kalek (POL)	12.45
3.	Kerstin Knabe (GDR)	12.54
4.	Bettine Jahn (GDR)	12.55
5.	Sabine Mobius (GDR)	12.62

=== 400m Hurdles ===
RANK	1982 WORLD BEST PERFORMERS	TIME
1.	Ann-Louise Skoglund (SWE)	54.57
2.	Petra Pfaff (GDR)	54.89
3.	Chantal Réga (FRA)	54.93
4.	Ellen Fiedler (GDR)	54.96

=== High Jump ===
RANK	1982 WORLD BEST PERFORMERS	HEIGHT
1.	Ulrike Meyfarth (FRG)	2.02
2.	Coleen Sommer (USA)	1.98
2.	Tamara Bykova (URS)	1.98
2.	Sara Simeoni (ITA)	1.98
5.	Jutta Kirst (GDR)	1.97
5.	Yelena Popkova (URS)	1.97

=== Long Jump ===
RANK	1982 WORLD BEST PERFORMERS	DISTANCE
1.	Valy Ionescu (ROU)	7.20
2.	Anişoara Cuşmir (ROU)	7.15
3.	Heike Daute (GDR)	6.98
4.	Tatyana Skachko (URS)	6.92
5.	Jodi Anderson (USA)	6.91

=== Discus ===
RANK	1982 WORLD BEST PERFORMERS	DISTANCE
1.	Irina Meszynski (GDR)	71.40
2.	Mariya Petkova (BUL)	71.20
3.	Tsvetanka Khristova (BUL)	70.64
4.	Galina Savinkova (URS)	69.90
5.	Gisela Beyer (GDR)	69.76

=== Shot Put ===
RANK	1982 WORLD BEST PERFORMERS	DISTANCE
1.	Ilona Slupianek (GDR)	21.80
2.	Verzhinia Veselinova (BUL)	21.61
3.	Helena Fibingerová (TCH)	21.55
4.	Liane Schmuhl (GDR)	21.27
5.	Nunu Abashidze (URS)	21.23

=== Javelin (old design) ===
RANK	1982 WORLD BEST PERFORMERS	DISTANCE
1.	Sofia Sakorafa (GRE)	74.40
2.	Tiina Lillak (FIN)	74.20
3.	Anna Verouli (GRE)	70.02
4.	Petra Rivers (AUS)	69.28
5.	Antje Zöllkau (GDR)	68.38

=== Heptathlon ===
RANK	1982 WORLD BEST PERFORMERS	POINTS
1.	Ramona Neubert (GDR)	6845
2.	Natalya Grachova (URS)	6646
3.	Sabine Mobius (GDR)	6629
4.	Natalya Shubenkova (URS)	6524
5.	Sabine Everts (FRG)	6523

== Births ==
=== January ===
- January 2 – Athanasia Tsoumeleka, Greek race walker
- January 3 – Eşref Apak, Turkish hammer thrower
- January 5 – Vadims Vasiļevskis, Latvian athlete
- January 12 – Dimitrios Tsiamis, Greek triple jumper
- January 24 – Hamdi Dhouibi, Tunisian decathlete

=== February ===
- February 2 – Dorcus Inzikuru, Ugandan athlete
- February 7 – Rumyana Karapetrova, Bulgarian javelin thrower
- February 8 – Iryna Shtanhyeyeva, Ukrainian sprinter
- February 9 – Zersenay Tadese, Eritrean athlete
- February 10 – Justin Gatlin, American athlete
- February 18 – Krisztián Pars, Hungarian hammer thrower

=== March ===
- March 1 – Leryn Franco, Paraguayan javelin thrower
- March 7 – Josh Rohatinsky, American long-distance runner
- March 14 – Yuleidis Limonta, Cuban heptathlete
- March 16 – Inga Kožarenoka, Latvian javelin thrower
- March 25 – Kayoko Fukushi, Japanese long-distance runner
- March 31 – Janice Josephs, South African heptathlete

=== April ===
- April 15 – Jean-Jacques Nkouloukidi, Italian race walker
- April 20 – Arnoud Okken, Dutch middle-distance runner
- April 20 – Dennis Leyckes, German decathlete
- April 25 – Victoria Mitchell, Australian long-distance runner

=== May ===
- May 6 – Dilshod Nazarov, Tajikistani hammer thrower
- May 10 – Yochai Halevi, Israeli long jumper and triple jumper
- May 12 – Marvin Anderson, Jamaican sprinter
- May 15 – Veronica Campbell-Brown, Jamaican athlete
- May 20 – Mihail Stamatoyiannis, Greek shot putter
- May 25 – Ezekiel Kemboi, Kenyan athlete
- May 30 – Phaustin Baha Sulle, Tanzanian long-distance runner

=== June ===
- June 3 – Yelena Isinbayeva, Russian pole vaulter
- June 5 – Fabiano Peçanha, Brazilian middle-distance runner
- June 11 – Vanessa Boslak, French pole vaulter
- June 13 – Kenenisa Bekele, Ethiopian distance runner
- June 25 – Esther Dankwah, Ghanaian sprinter

=== July ===
- July 8 – Park Chil-Sung, South Korean race walker
- July 14 – Vyacheslav Muravyev, Kazakhstani sprinter
- July 23 – Thaimara Rivas, Venezuelan heptathlete

=== August ===
- August 5 – Jo Ankier, British long-distance runner
- August 9 – Robert Häggblom, Finnish shot putter
- August 9 – Byron Piedra, Ecuadorian distance runner
- August 31 – Lien Huyghebaert, Belgian athlete

=== September ===
- September 11 – Elvan Abeylegesse, Ethiopian-born Turkish track and field athlete
- September 15 – Matthew Boyles, American race walker
- September 29 – Salome Chepchumba, Kenyan middle-distance runner

=== October ===
- October 25 – Aarik Wilson, American long jumper and triple jumper

=== November ===
- November 4 – Kamila Skolimowska, Polish hammer thrower (d. 2009)
- November 6 – Loree Smith, American hammer thrower
- November 9 – Eloise Wellings, Australian long-distance runner
- November 11 – Ivan Babaryka, Ukrainian long-distance runner
- November 11 – Asafa Powell, Jamaican sprinter
- November 29 – Andrei Chubsa, Belarusian high jumper

=== December ===
- December 2 – Morten Jensen, Danish long jumper
- December 11 – Darren Gilford, Maltese athlete
- December 25 – Samson Ramadhani, Tanzanian long-distance runner

== Deaths ==
- April 26 – Ville Ritola (86), Finnish Olympic gold medal runner (b. 1896)
- June 25 – Ed Hamm (76), American athlete (b. 1906)
- June 28 – Wiesław Maniak (41), Polish sprinter (b. 1938)
- August 4 – Henk van der Wal (95), Dutch track and field athlete (b. 1886)
