= Athletics at the 1977 Summer Universiade – Women's shot put =

The women's shot put event at the 1977 Summer Universiade was held at the Vasil Levski National Stadium in Sofia on 23 August.

== Results ==
Rank	Athlete	Nationality	Result	Notes
1st place, gold medalist(s)	Elena Stoyanova	Bulgaria	19.98	
2nd place, silver medalist(s)	Nina Isayeva	Soviet Union	19.56	
3rd place, bronze medalist(s)	Helma Knorscheidt	East Germany	19.29	
4	Ivanka Petrova	Bulgaria	19.12	
5	Vera Tsapkalenko	Soviet Union	18.52	
6	Mihaela Loghin	Romania	18.02	
7	Valentina Groapa	Romania	17.05	
8	Bożena Wojciekian	Poland	16.16	
9	Lucette Moreau	Canada	15.29	
10	Jennifer Pace	Malta	11.69	
