= 1983 World Championships in Athletics – Women's shot put =

These are the official results of the Women's Shot Put event at the 1983 World Championships in Helsinki, Finland. The final was held on Friday August 12, 1983. The qualification mark was set at 17.00 metres.

== Medalists ==
Gold	Helena Fibingerová; Czechoslovakia (TCH)
Silver	Helma Knorscheidt; East Germany (GDR)
Bronze	Ilona Slupianek; East Germany (GDR)

== Schedule ==
- All times are Eastern European Time (UTC+2)

Qualification Round
Group A	Group B
10.08.1983 – ??:??h	10.08.1983 – ??:??h
Final Round
12.08.1983 – ??:??h

== Abbreviations ==
- All results shown are in metres

Q	automatic qualification
q	qualification by rank
DNS	did not start
NM	no mark
WR	world record
AR	area record
NR	national record
PB	personal best
SB	season best

== Records ==
Standing records prior to the 1983 World Athletics Championships
World Record	Ilona Slupianek (GDR)	22.45 m	May 11, 1980	Potsdam, East Germany
Event Record	New event			
Broken records during the 1983 World Athletics Championships
Event Record	Helena Fibingerová (TCH)	19.25 m	August 10, 1983	Helsinki, Finland
Event Record	Ilona Slupianek (GDR)	19.99 m	August 10, 1983	Helsinki, Finland
Event Record	Helma Knorscheidt (GDR)	20.30 m	August 12, 1983	Helsinki, Finland
Event Record	Ilona Slupianek (GDR)	20.56 m	August 12, 1983	Helsinki, Finland
Event Record	Helma Knorscheidt (GDR)	20.70 m	August 12, 1983	Helsinki, Finland
Event Record	Helena Fibingerová (TCH)	21.05 m	August 12, 1983	Helsinki, Finland

== Qualification ==
=== Group A ===
Rank	Overall	Athlete	Attempts			Distance	Note
Rank	Overall	Athlete	1	2	3	Distance	Note
1	3	Helena Fibingerová (TCH)	19.25	—	—	19.25 m	
2	4	María Elena Sarría (CUB)	19.24	—	—	19.24 m	
3	5	Nunu Abashidze (URS)	19.10	—	—	19.10 m	
4	6	Helma Knorscheidt (GDR)	19.09	—	—	19.09 m	
5	9	Venissa Head (GBR)	18.41	—	—	18.41 m	
6	11	Gael Mulhall-Martin (AUS)	16.98	17.79	—	17.79 m	
7	13	Shen Lijuan (CHN)	16.99	16.57	16.95	16.99 m	
8	15	Lorna Griffin (USA)	15.21	15.86	16.50	16.50 m	
9	19	Maryline Adam (VAN)	10.37	10.80	11.32	11.32 m	
10	20	Magdalene Springer (MNT)	X	X	9.78	9.78 m	

=== Group B ===
Rank	Overall	Athlete	Attempts			Distance	Note
Rank	Overall	Athlete	1	2	3	Distance	Note
1	1	Ilona Slupianek (GDR)	19.99	—	—	19.99 m	
2	2	Natalya Lisovskaya (URS)	19.68	—	—	19.68 m	
3	7	Mihaela Loghin (ROU)	18.97	—	—	18.97 m	
4	8	Zdeňka Šilhavá (TCH)	18.57	—	—	18.57 m	
5	10	Claudia Losch (FRG)	18.24	—	—	18.24 m	
6	12	Judy Oakes (GBR)	17.61	—	—	17.61 m	
7	14	Li Meisu (CHN)	16.71	16.91	X	16.91 m	
8	16	Meg Ritchie (GBR)	16.02	16.14	X	16.14 m	
9	17	Rosemarie Hauch (CAN)	15.37	15.32	15.03	15.37 m	
10	18	Odette Mistoul (GAB)	13.24	14.23	13.64	14.23 m	

== Final ==
Rank	Athlete	Attempts						Distance	Note
Rank	Athlete	1	2	3	4	5	6	Distance	Note
1st place, gold medalist(s)	Helena Fibingerová (TCH)	19.89	19.69	19.72	19.94	20.30	21.05	21.05 m	
2nd place, silver medalist(s)	Helma Knorscheidt (GDR)	20.30	20.70	20.55	20.47	X	20.25	20.70 m	
3rd place, bronze medalist(s)	Ilona Slupianek (GDR)	20.56	20.32	19.97	19.52	X	X	20.56 m	
4	Nunu Abashidze (URS)	18.68	19.16	19.11	20.55	19.77	X	20.55 m	
5	Natalya Lisovskaya (URS)	19.53	X	20.02	20.01	19.63	19.45	20.02 m	
6	Mihaela Loghin (ROU)	19.85	19.82	19.77	19.34	19.72	19.08	19.85 m	
7	Claudia Losch (FRG)	19.72	18.97	X	19.54	18.96	18.21	19.72 m	
8	María Elena Sarría (CUB)	18.45	19.44	19.32	19.47	X	18.87	19.47 m	
9	Zdeňka Šilhavá (TCH)	18.24	17.94	19.00				19.00 m	
10	Venissa Head (GBR)	18.05	17.60	17.48				18.05 m	
11	Gael Mulhall-Martin (AUS)	17.43	17.49	17.79				17.79 m	
12	Judy Oakes (GBR)	17.01	17.19	17.52				17.52 m	

== See also ==
- 1978 Women's European Championships Shot Put (Prague)
- 1980 Women's Olympic Shot Put (Moscow)
- 1982 Women's European Championships Shot Put (Athens)
- 1983 Shot Put Year Ranking
- 1984 Women's Olympic Shot Put (Los Angeles)
- 1986 Women's European Championships Shot Put (Stuttgart)
- 1988 Women's Olympic Shot Put (Seoul)
