= 1982 European Athletics Championships – Women's shot put =

Athletics event

Women's shot put at the European Athletics Championships

These are the official results of the Women's Shot Put event at the 1982 European Championships in Athens, Greece. The final was held at the Olympic Stadium "Spiros Louis" on 6 September 1982.

== Medalists ==
Gold	Ilona Slupianek; East Germany
Silver	Helena Fibingerová; Czechoslovakia
Bronze	Nunu Abashidze; Soviet Union

== Results ==
=== Final ===
6 September

Rank	Name	Nationality	Result	Notes
1st place, gold medalist(s)	Ilona Slupianek	East Germany	21.59	CR
2nd place, silver medalist(s)	Helena Fibingerová	Czechoslovakia	20.94	
3rd place, bronze medalist(s)	Nunu Abashidze	Soviet Union	20.82	
4	Elena Stoyanova	Bulgaria	20.35	
5	Verzhinia Veselinova	Bulgaria	20.23	
6	Helma Knorscheidt	East Germany	20.21	
7	Liane Schmuhl	East Germany	20.09	
8	Mihaela Loghin	Romania	18.91	
9	Zdeňka Šilhavá	Czechoslovakia	18.46	
10	Soultana Saroudi	Greece	17.39	
11	Gunnel Hettman	Sweden	13.24	

== Participation ==
According to an unofficial count, 11 athletes from 7 countries participated in the event.

- Bulgaria (2)
- Czechoslovakia (2)
- East Germany (3)
- Greece (1)
- Romania (1)
- Soviet Union (1)
- Sweden (1)

== See also ==
- 1980 Women's Olympic Shot Put (Moscow)
- 1982 Shot Put Year Ranking
- 1983 Women's World Championships Shot Put (Helsinki)
- 1984 Women's Olympic Shot Put (Los Angeles)
- 1987 Women's World Championships Shot Put (Rome)
- 1988 Women's Olympic Shot Put (Seoul)
