= 1978 European Athletics Championships – Women's shot put =

Women's shot put at the European Athletics Championships

The women's shot put at the 1978 European Athletics Championships was held in Prague, then Czechoslovakia, at Stadion Evžena Rošického on 30 August 1978.

== Medalists ==
Gold	Ilona Slupianek; East Germany
Silver	Helena Fibingerová; Czechoslovakia
Bronze	Margitta Droese; East Germany

== Results ==
=== Final ===
30 August

Rank	Name	Nationality	Result	Notes
1st place, gold medalist(s)	Ilona Slupianek	East Germany	21.41	CR
2nd place, silver medalist(s)	Helena Fibingerová	Czechoslovakia	20.86	
3rd place, bronze medalist(s)	Margitta Droese	East Germany	20.58	
4	Svetlana Krachevskaya	Soviet Union	20.13	
5	Eva Wilms	West Germany	19.20	
6	Ivanka Petrova	Bulgaria	18.85	
7	Svetlana Melnikova	Soviet Union	18.63	
8	Mihaela Loghin	Romania	17.35	
9	Zdeňka Šilhavá	Czechoslovakia	17.23	
10	Beatrix Philipp	West Germany	17.13	
	Nina Isayeva	Soviet Union	NM	
	Elena Stoyanova	Bulgaria	DQ	Doping^{†}

^{†}Elena Stoyanova ranked initially 5th (19.43m), but was disqualified for infringement of IAAF doping rules.

== Participation ==
According to an unofficial count, 12 athletes from 6 countries participated in the event.

- Bulgaria (2)
- Czechoslovakia (2)
- East Germany (2)
- Romania (1)
- Soviet Union (3)
- West Germany (2)
