= 1981 European Athletics Indoor Championships – Women's shot put =

The women's shot put event at the 1981 European Athletics Indoor Championships was held on 21 February.

== Results ==
Rank	Name	Nationality	#1	#2	#3	#4	#5	#6	Result	Notes
1st place, gold medalist(s)	Ilona Slupianek	East Germany	20.11	20.77	x	20.23	19.33	19.45	20.77	
2nd place, silver medalist(s)	Helena Fibingerová	Czechoslovakia	19.65	20.64	19.76	18.94	19.27	20.07	20.64	
3rd place, bronze medalist(s)	Helma Knorscheidt	East Germany	18.53	20.09	19.67	20.12	19.44	18.92	20.12	
~~4~~	Nunu Abashidze	Soviet Union	~~17.88~~	~~18.50~~	~~x~~	~~x~~	~~18.19~~	~~x~~	~~18.50~~	DQ
4	Venissa Head	Great Britain	16.14	x	16.72	17.65	16.46	17.10	17.65	
5	Soultana Saroudi	Greece	17.31	16.89	17.17	17.28	17.44	17.27	17.44	
6	Tuula Kivi	Finland	15.19	16.77	16.01	x	x	15.78	16.77	
7	Léone Bertimon	France	16.59	15.95	16.46	x	16.18	16.22	16.59	
8	Angela Littlewood	Great Britain	16.50	x	16.35				16.50	
9	Simone Créantor	France	15.98	x	15.42				15.98	
