= Athletics at the 1984 Summer Olympics – Women's shot put =

Women's shot put at the Games of the XXIII Olympiad
- Venues: Los Angeles Memorial Coliseum
- Dates: 3 August 1984
- Competitors: 13 from 8 nations
- Winning distance: 20.48

Medalists
1st place, gold medalist(s)		Claudia Losch; West Germany
2nd place, silver medalist(s)		Mihaela Loghin; Romania
3rd place, bronze medalist(s)		Gael Mulhall; Australia

The women's shot put event at the 1984 Summer Olympics in Los Angeles, California had an entry list of 13 competitors. The final was held on 3 August 1984.

The winning margin was 1 cm which as of June 2024 remains the only time the women's shot put has been won by less than 4 cm at the Olympics.

== Medalists ==
Gold	Claudia Losch; West Germany
Silver	Mihaela Loghin; Romania
Bronze	Gael Mulhall; Australia

== Abbreviations ==
- All results shown are in metres

Q	automatic qualification
q	qualification by rank
DNS	did not start
NM	no mark
OR	olympic record
WR	world record
AR	area record
NR	national record
PB	personal best
SB	season best

== Records ==
Standing records prior to the 1984 Summer Olympics
World Record	Natalya Lisovskaya (URS)	22.53 m	May 27, 1984	Sochi, Soviet Union
Olympic Record	Ilona Slupianek (GDR)	22.41 m	July 24, 1980	Moscow, Soviet Union

== Final ==
Rank	Athlete	Attempts						Distance	Note
Rank	Athlete	1	2	3	4	5	6	Distance	Note
1st place, gold medalist(s)	Claudia Losch (FRG)	19.97	20.31	19.33	20.06	19.96	20.48	20.48 m	
2nd place, silver medalist(s)	Mihaela Loghin (ROM)	19.67	19.73	19.95	20.47	20.25	20.09	20.47 m	
3rd place, bronze medalist(s)	Gael Martin (AUS)	18.10	19.19	18.75	18.53	X	18.34	19.19 m	
4	Judy Oakes (GBR)	18.14	17.76	18.01	18.08	X	17.81	18.14 m	
5	Li Meisu (CHN)	17.37	X	17.44	17.96	17.61	17.19	17.96 m	
6	Venissa Head (GBR)	X	17.90	X	17.37	15.59	16.40	17.90 m	
7	Carol Cady (USA)	17.22	17.23	17.10	16.83	16.32	17.19	17.23 m	
8	Florența Crăciunescu (ROM)	16.62	17.23	17.10	16.45	X	17.05	17.23 m	
9	Lorna Griffin (USA)	15.87	16.08	17.00				17.00 m	
10	Yang Yanqin (CHN)	16.76	16.97	16.46				16.97 m	
11	Ramona Pagel (USA)	16.06	15.69	15.90				16.06 m	
12	Carmen Ionesco (CAN)	14.92	15.25	14.96				15.25 m	
13	Odette Mistoul (GAB)	14.39	X	14.59				14.59 m	

== See also ==
- 1982 Women's European Championships Shot Put (Athens)
- 1983 Women's World Championships Shot Put (Helsinki)
- 1984 Women's Friendship Games Shot Put (Prague)
- 1986 Women's European Championships Shot Put (Stuttgart)
- 1987 Women's World Championships Shot Put (Rome)
