= 1977 European Athletics Indoor Championships – Women's shot put =

The women's shot put event at the 1977 European Athletics Indoor Championships was held on 13 March in San Sebastián. Helena Fibingerová's winning mark of 21.46 metres as of 2024 is the longest standing European Athletics Indoor Championships record.

== Results ==
Rank	Name	Nationality	#1	#2	#3	#4	#5	#6	Result	Notes
1st place, gold medalist(s)	Helena Fibingerová	Czechoslovakia	21.46	x	x	x	20.49	20.91	21.46	CR
2nd place, silver medalist(s)	Ilona Slupianek	East Germany	21.12	20.21	20.43	20.65	20.78	20.53	21.12	
3rd place, bronze medalist(s)	Eva Wilms	West Germany	17.54	19.86	19.95	20.85	20.87	19.38	20.87	
4	Margitta Droese	East Germany	20.09	19.61	19.31	19.68	x	19.66	20.09	
5	Svetlana Krachevskaya	Soviet Union	17.62	19.62	19.36	19.52	x	18.95	19.62	
6	Beatrix Philipp	West Germany	16.88	17.35	16.93	16.47	17.14	x	17.35	
7	Zdeňka Bartoňová	Czechoslovakia	16.62	16.55	16.60	17.04	17.05	16.72	17.05	
