= 1978 European Athletics Indoor Championships – Women's shot put =

The women's shot put event at the 1978 European Athletics Indoor Championships was held on 12 March in Milan.

== Results ==
Rank	Name	Nationality	#1	#2	#3	#4	#5	#6	Result	Notes
1st place, gold medalist(s)	Helena Fibingerová	Czechoslovakia	19.75	20.59	20.29	20.61	20.67	20.42	20.67	
2nd place, silver medalist(s)	Margitta Droese	East Germany							19.77	
3rd place, bronze medalist(s)	Eva Wilms	West Germany							19.24	
4	Elena Stoyanova	Bulgaria							19.22	
5	Zdeňka Bartoňová	Czechoslovakia							18.16	
6	Beatrix Philipp	West Germany							17.51	
7	Cinzia Petrucci	Italy							16.59	
8	Léone Bertimon	France							16.08	
