= 1976 European Athletics Indoor Championships – Women's shot put =

The women's shot put event at the 1976 European Athletics Indoor Championships was held on 22 February in Munich.

== Results ==
Rank	Name	Nationality	Result	Notes
1st place, gold medalist(s)	Ivanka Khristova	Bulgaria	20.45	
2nd place, silver medalist(s)	Svetlana Krachevskaya	Soviet Union	20.06	
3rd place, bronze medalist(s)	Ilona Schoknecht	East Germany	19.36	
4	Elena Stoyanova	Bulgaria	19.20	
5	Tamara Bufetova	Soviet Union	18.66	
6	Brigitte Griessing	East Germany	18.61	
7	Eva Wilms	West Germany	18.29	
8	Ludwika Chewińska	Poland	18.26	
9	Léone Bertimon	France	14.79	
10	Adilia Borges	Portugal	14.28	
