= Eva Wilms =

German shot putter (born 1952)

Medal record

Women's athletics

Representing West Germany

European Indoor Championships
Silver medal – second place	1980 Sindelfingen	Shot put
Bronze medal – third place	1977 San Sebastián	Shot put
Bronze medal – third place	1978 Milan	Shot put

Eva Wilms (German pronunciation: [ˈeːfa ˈvɪlms]; born 28 July 1952 in Essen, North Rhine-Westphalia) is a retired West German shot putter.

Her personal best throw was 21.43 metres, achieved in June 1977 in Munich. This places her sixth on the German all-time list, behind Ilona Slupianek, Claudia Losch, Marianne Adam, Margitta Droese and Ines Müller.

She competed for the sports clubs ESV Neuaubing and LAC Quelle Fürth during her active career.

In 1977, Wilmes threw the shot put 20.79 meters during a pentathlon event, which is referred to by European Athletics as a heptathlon world best.

== Achievements ==
Year	Competition	Venue	Position	Notes
Representing West Germany
1976	European Indoor Championships	Munich, Germany	7th	
1976	Olympic Games	Montreal, Canada	7th	
1977	European Indoor Championships	San Sebastián, Spain	3rd	
1978	European Indoor Championships	Milan, Italy	3rd	
1978	European Championships	Prague, Czechoslovakia	5th	
1980	European Indoor Championships	Sindelfingen, West Germany	2nd	

In fact Eva Wilms is a pentathlete. She set 2 world records in 1977. The following are her lists of performances in different events:

- Pentathlon [100mH, SP, HJ, LJ, 200m]: 4932p/1976 [including 20.94m SP and 23.9s 200m]
- Pentathlon [100mH, SP, HJ, LJ, 800m]: 4823p, former WR/1977-13.83s-20.95m-1.74m-6.29m-2.19.66s
- JV: 48,74m 1 Eva Wilms (20.07.52) 180/76 Sport Union Annen 03.09.73 Witten
- SP: 21.43m Eva Wilms FRG 28.07.52 2 Munich
- DT:59,42m 1 Eva Wilms (28.7.52) 180/83 LAC Quelle Fürth By 21.06.80 Garmisch-Partenkirchen
- LJ:6.29m 5K Eva Wilms (28.7.52) 180/83 LAC Quelle Fürth By 19.06.77 Bernhausen
- 200M: 23,9s (5K) Eva Wilms (28.7.52) 180/83 ESV Neuaubing By 05/09/76 Hannover
- 100MH:13,70s 5K Eva Wilms (28.7.52) 180/83 LAC Quelle Fürth By 14.05.77 Göttingen

Awards
Preceded by (Germany) Rosi Mittermaier	German Sportswoman of the Year; 1977	Succeeded by (Germany) Maria Epple
