= Liane Schmuhl =

Liane Schmuhl (born 29 June 1961) is a German female former track and field athlete who competed in the shot put for East Germany.

She won a gold medal at the Friendship Championships between Eastern Bloc junior athletes in 1978 with a mark of 15.96 m (52 ft 4 1/4 in). She followed this with a championship record throw of 18.33 m (60 ft 1 1/2 in) to win gold at the 1979 European Athletics Junior Championships held in neighbouring Poland. This mark was later bettered by another East German, Bettina Libera, in 1985.

Her career high came in the 1982 season. Competing for the TSC Berlin club, she won a national title at the East German Indoor Athletics Championships, before throwing a new best of 20.70 m (67 ft 10 3/4 in) indoors. She ranked second in the world that indoor season, after Bulgaria's Verzhinia Veselinova. In Cottbus that June she achieved a lifetime best throw of 21.27 m (69 ft 9 1/4 in). This ranked her fourth globally that year, and continues to mark her as the third best ever under-23 European thrower (behind Natalya Lisovskaya and Ilona Slupianek). This moved her up to the 12th best thrower ever at that point in time, and as of 2018 she remains in the top 25 best shot putters.

A runner-up placing to Slupianek at the East German Athletics Championships gained Schmuhl selection for the 1982 European Athletics Championships, where she placed seventh in the final. She remained highly ranked in the 1983 season, being second to Slupianek again at the national championships and having a season's best of 20.82 m (68 ft 3 1/2 in) for seventh globally. She competed for one more season, with a throw of 20.37 m (66 ft 9 3/4 in) being beyond her best but still in the global top twelve.

Her name was later published by Brigitte Berendonk among leaked Stasi documents showing that she was subject to the East German national doping programme.

== International competitions ==
Year	Competition	Venue	Position	Notes
1978	Friendship Championships	Bucharest, Romania	1st	15.96 m
1979	European Junior Championships	Bydgoszcz, Poland	1st	18.33 m
1982	European Championships	Athens, Greece	7th	20.09 m

== National titles ==
- East German Indoor Athletics Championships
  - Shot put: 1982
