= Athletics at the Friendship Games – Women's shot put =

The women's shot put event at the Friendship Games was held on 16 August 1984 at the Evžen Rošický Stadium in Prague, Czechoslovakia.

== Results ==
| Rank | Name | Nationality | #1 | #2 | #3 | #4 | #5 | #6 | Result | Notes |
|---|---|---|---|---|---|---|---|---|---|---|
| 1st place, gold medalist(s) | Natalya Lisovskaya | Soviet Union | 21.83 | 21.40 | 21.75 | 21.83 | 21.96 | 21.89 | 21.96 | |
| 2nd place, silver medalist(s) | Helena Fibingerová | Czechoslovakia | 20.57 | 20.32 | 20.96 | 20.54 | 21.33 | 20.25 | 21.33 | |
| 3rd place, bronze medalist(s) | Nunu Abashidze | Soviet Union | 18.00 | 21.18 | 21.11 | 19.70 | x | x | 21.18 | |
| 4 | Ines Müller | East Germany | | | | | | | 20.76 | |
| 5 | María Elena Sarría | Cuba | | | | | | | 19.93 | |
| 6 | Cordula Schulze | East Germany | | | | | | | 19.78 | |
| 7 | Claudia Losch | West Germany | | | | | | | 18.81 | |
| 8 | Alena Vitoulová | Czechoslovakia | | | | | | | 17.06 | |

== See also ==
- Athletics at the 1984 Summer Olympics – Women's shot put
