= Ken Mulhall =

Australian rules footballer (1927–2022)

Personal information
- Full name: Kenneth Burns Mulhall
- Born: 22 September 1927
- Died: 15 May 2022 (aged 94)
- Original team: Camden / East Malvern
- Height: 185 cm (6 ft 1 in)
- Weight: 79.5 kg (175 lb)
- Position: Ruck / centre half-forward

Playing career^{1}
Years	Club	Games (Goals)
1946–57	St Kilda	134 (81)
- ^{1} Playing statistics correct to the end of 1957.

Kenneth Burns Mulhall (22 September 1927 – 15 May 2022) was an Australian rules footballer who played with St Kilda in the Victorian Football League (VFL).

== Family ==
He is the father of the Australian track and field athlete Gael Patricia Mulhall-Martin (1956-).
