= 1980 European Athletics Indoor Championships – Women's shot put =

International sporting competition

The women's shot put event at the 1980 European Athletics Indoor Championships was held on 1 March in Sindelfingen.

== Results ==
Rank	Name	Nationality	#1	#2	#3	#4	#5	#6	Result	Notes
1st place, gold medalist(s)	Helena Fibingerová	Czechoslovakia	19.92	19.20	19.33	19.13	x	x	19.92	
2nd place, silver medalist(s)	Eva Wilms	West Germany	19.31	19.18	19.22	19.02	19.66	19.49	19.66	
3rd place, bronze medalist(s)	Beatrix Philipp	West Germany	17.38	16.58	17.28	17.28	17.46	17.59	17.59	
4	Cinzia Petrucci	Italy							16.96	
5	Léone Bertimon	France							16.45	
