= Del Davis (high jumper) =

American high jumper (born 1960)

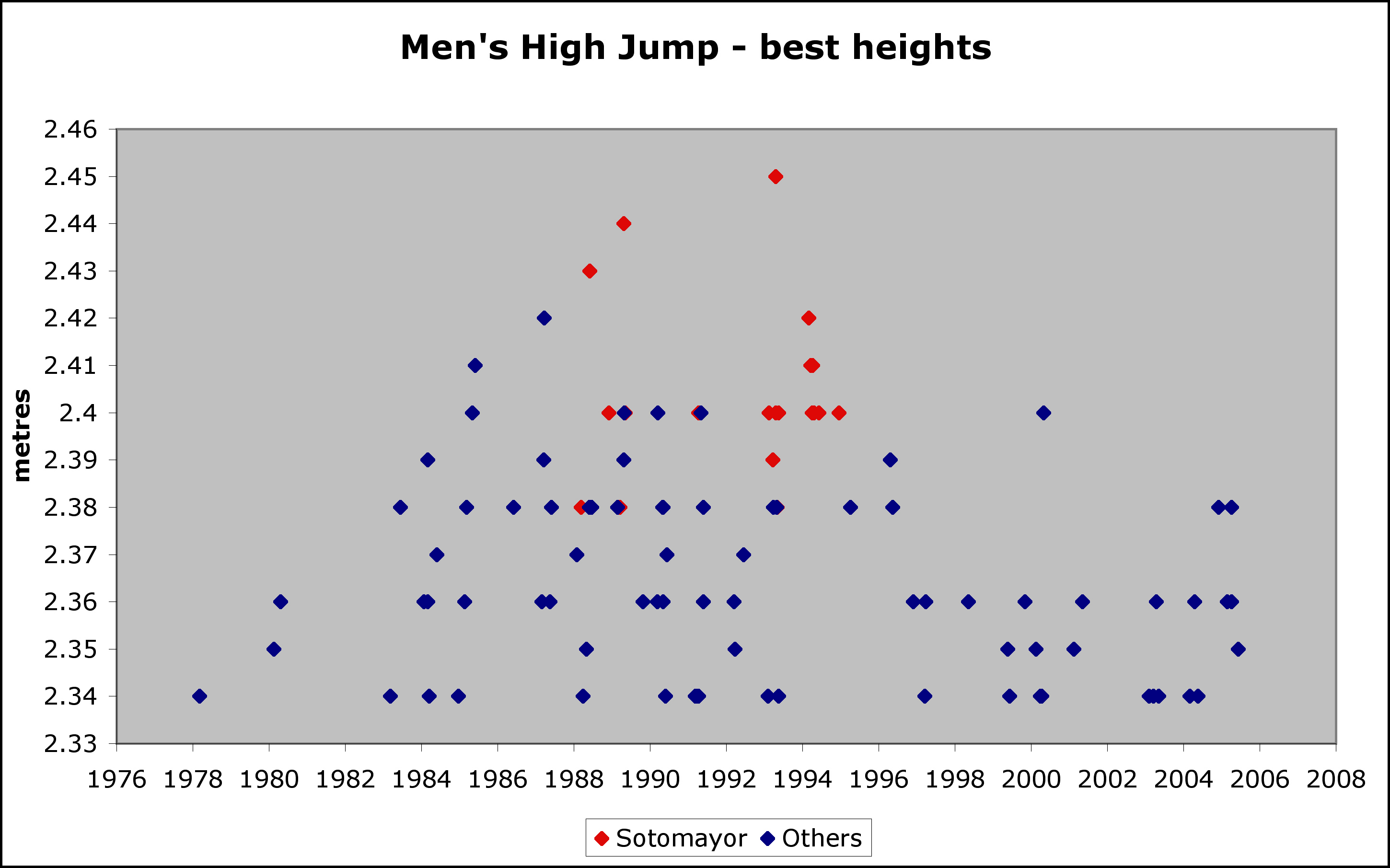
Men's high jump best heights extracted from the IAAF's all-time lists of outdoor high jumps.

Del Davis (born May 3, 1960 in California) is an American former high jumper and former American record holder.

His personal best jump is 7 feet 7.25 inches (2.3178 m); achieved during the 1982 NCAA Track and Field Championships. His mark equaled the U.S. record held by Dwight Stones.

He attended UCLA and graduated with a bachelor of science in Mathematics.
