= Venissa Head =

Welsh track and field athlete

Personal information
- Nationality: British (Welsh)
- Born: September 1956 (age 69) Merthyr Tydfil, Wales

Sport
- Sport: Athletics
- Event: shot put / discus throw
- Club: Cardiff AAC; Bristol and West AC

Venissa Anne Head (born 1 September 1956) is a former international track and field athlete from Wales who competed at the 1984 Summer Olympics.

== Biography ==
Head went to secondary school at Cyfarthfa Castle Grammar School in Wales, and it was whilst there that she won her first of 15 Welsh shot put titles, at the age of 17. She won 25 Welsh titles in total, with her ten successive discus titles coming between 1979 and 1988.

She was a member of the Cardiff Athletic Club, where she still holds the club discus record, as well as both the indoor and outdoor shot put records. She was also a member of Bristol and West Athletic Club, and still holds the club discus and shot put records.

She took part in the inaugural IAAF World Championships in 1983, competing in both the shot put and the discus throw. In the shot put, she finished 5th in Group A in qualifying with a put of 18.41 metres. She putted a shorter 18.05 in the final to finish 10th overall. This result is the best ever by a British athlete. No British athletes have ever made the final since. In the discus she finished 8th in Qualifying Group B with a throw of 53.78, and so did not progress to the final.

She was part of the British Olympic team for the 1984 Olympic Games in Los Angeles, where she again competed in the discus throw and shot put. In the discus, she threw 55.24 metres in qualifying, which was 24 cm further than the mark needed to qualify for the final, and was the shortest mark to automatically qualify. She finished sixth in Group A and eighth overall in qualifying. In the final, she finished seventh, with a best throw of 58.18 metres, achieved in the third round. In the shot put, she finished sixth with a throw of 17.90 metres, in a competition that went straight to a final as there were only thirteen entrants, caused by the 1984 Summer Olympics boycott.

Head also represented Wales at the Commonwealth Games, winning the silver medal in the discus throw at the 1986 Commonwealth Games in Edinburgh.

She is also a musician in Pontypool Brass Band, playing the tuba.

She was inducted into the Welsh Athletics Hall of Fame in 2010.

She is the British indoor shot put record holder, with her personal best of 19.06 metres set on 7 April 1984. This put also places her second on the overall all-time list. She was second on the British all-time list for discus until 27 February 2016, when a throw by Jade Lally relegated her to third.
