= Li Meisu =

Chinese shot putter (born 1959)

Personal information
- Born: April 17, 1959 (age 67)
Medal record
Women's athletics
Representing China
Olympic Games
Bronze medal – third place	1988 Seoul	Shot put
Asian Championships
Gold medal – first place	1998 Fukuoka	Shot put
Silver medal – second place	1985 Jakarta	Shot put

Li Meisu (Chinese: 李梅素; pinyin: Lǐ Méisù; born April 17, 1959, in Hebei) is a retired Chinese shot putter who won the bronze medal at the 1988 Summer Olympics in Seoul.

She also won the Asian Games in 1982 and 1998, the Asian Championships in 1998 and the East Asian Games in 1997.

Her personal best of 21.76, is also an Asian record and ranks her seventh on the shot put all-time lists.

Since her retirement from competition, she has turned to coaching. She coached Gong Lijiao to an Olympic silver medal in 2012 and Olympic gold medal in 2020.

== International competitions ==
Year	Competition	Venue	Position	Notes
Representing China
1983	World Championships	Helsinki, Finland	14th (q)	16.91 m
1988	Olympic Games	Seoul, South Korea	3rd	21.06 m
1997	World Championships	Athens, Greece	6th	18.62 m
1998	Asian Championships	Fukuoka, Japan	1st	18.63 m
