= Margitta Pufe =

East German shot putter and discus thrower

Personal information
- Nationality: East Germany
- Born: Margitta Ludewig; 10 September 1952 (age 74) Gera, East Germany
- Height: 1.80 m (5 ft 11 in)
- Weight: 83 kg (183 lb)

Sport
- Country: East Germany
- Sport: Women's athletics
- Events: Shot put Discus throw
- Club: SC Motor Jena

Achievements and titles
- Personal bests: 21.58 (1978); 68.64 (1979)
Medal record
Women's athletics
Representing East Germany
Olympic Games
Bronze medal – third place	1980 Moscow	Shot put
European Championships
Silver medal – second place	1978 Prague	Discus throw
Bronze medal – third place	1978 Prague	Shot put
European Indoor Championships
Silver medal – second place	1978 Milan	Shot put

Margitta Pufe (née Ludewig, formerly known as Margitta Droese or Margitta Droese-Pufe, born 10 September 1952 in Gera, Thuringia), is a German track athlete, who from the mid-1970s to 1980 competed for the German Democratic Republic and was among the world's best shot putters and discus throwers. Her greatest achievement was winning a bronze medal at the 1980 Summer Olympic Games in Moscow in shot put.

Pufe started her career with SC Motor Jena and trained under Ingrid Kleppe. While competing, Pufe was 1.80 m tall and weighed 83 kg. After her competitive career came to an end, Pufe remained active in the sport as a shot put and discus coach first for VEB Carl Zeiss Jena and currently for TuS Jena.

== International competitions ==
- 1970 European Athletics Junior Championships: 3rd place in shot put, 6th place in Discus
- 1976 Summer Olympics: 6th place in shot put (19.79 m, under the name Margitta Droese)
- 1978 European Athletics Championships: 3rd place in shot put (18.06 – 19.59 – 20.28 – 20.58 – 20.48 – 20.31), 2nd place in discus (63.76 – 63.32 – foul – 64.04 – 63.34 – 63.96)
- 1980 Summer Olympics: 3rd place in shot put (21.20 – 21.07 – 20.42 – 20.72 – 20.05 – 20.36), 5th place in discus (51.72 – 64.84 – 61.24 – 58.70 – foul – 66.12)
