= Helma Knorscheidt =

East German shot putter

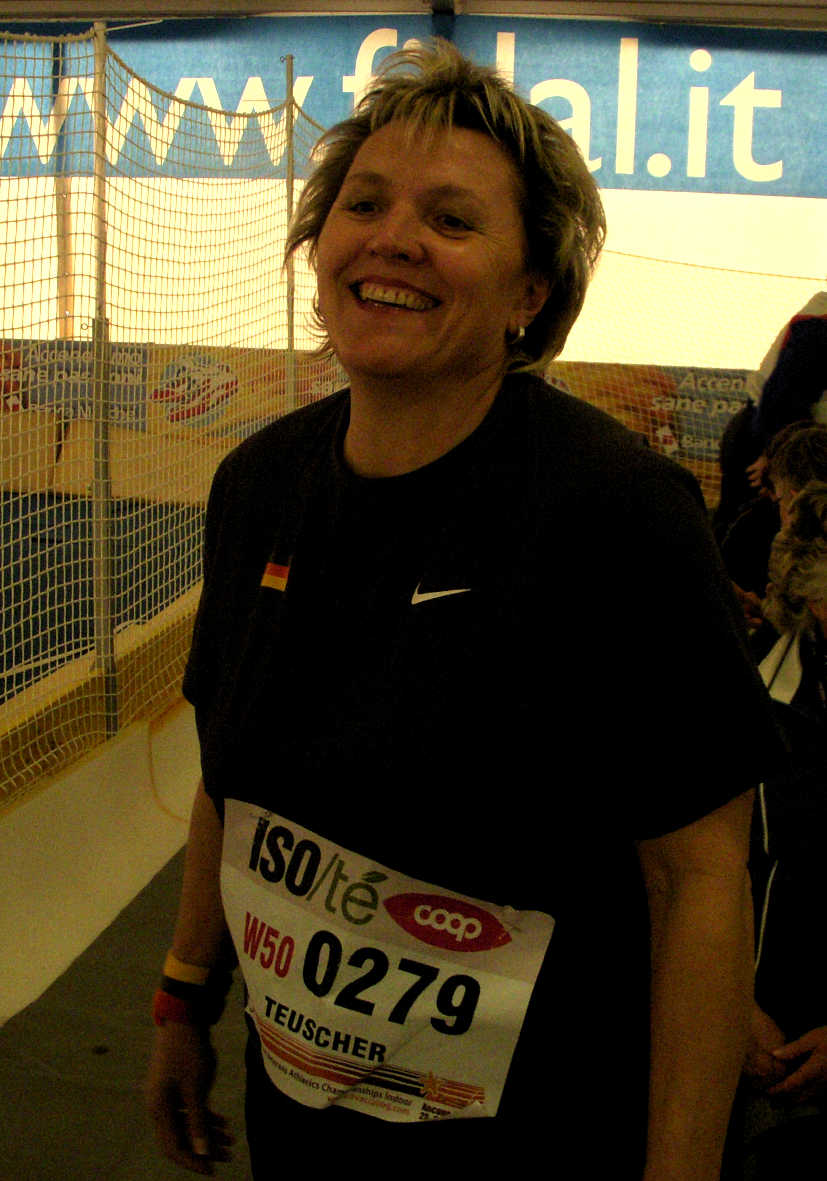

Personal information
- Nationality: East Germany
- Born: 31 December 1956 (age 69) Nauendorf, Saxony-Anhalt, East Germany
- Height: 1.76 m (5 ft 9 in)
- Weight: 90 kg (198 lb)

Sport
- Country: East Germany
- Sport: Athletics
- Event: Shot put
- Club: SC Chemie Halle

Achievements and titles
- Personal best: 21.19 m (1984)
Medal record
Women's Athletics
Representing East Germany
World Championships
Silver medal – second place	1983 Helsinki	Shot put
European Indoor Championships
Silver medal – second place	1983 Budapest	Shot put
Bronze medal – third place	1981 Grenoble	Shot put
Universiade
Gold medal – first place	1981 Bucharest	Shot put
Silver medal – second place	1979 Mexico City	Shot put
Bronze medal – third place	1977 Sofia	Shot put

Helma Knorscheidt (born 31 December 1956 in Nauendorf, Saxony-Anhalt) is an East German shot putter.

She competed for the sports club SC Chemie Halle during her active career.

As a veteran Helma Knorscheidt (now married Teuscher) is active as well. She took part at several World Masters Athletics Championships and European Veterans Athletics Championships. She was most successful by winning the shot put competition age group W50 at World Championships 2007 in Riccione (Italy) (14,40 m using 3 kg shot) and gaining the world record in same age group at European Championship 2008 in Ljubljana (result 14,94 m)(excelled in 2009 by Alexandra Marghieva)

== Achievements ==
Year	Competition	Venue	Position	Notes
Representing East Germany
1977	Universiade	Sofia, Bulgaria	3rd	
1979	Universiade	Mexico City, Mexico	2nd	
1981	European Indoor Championships	Grenoble, France	3rd	
1981	Universiade	Bucharest, Romania	1st	
1982	European Championships	Athens, Greece	6th	20.21 m
1983	European Indoor Championships	Budapest, Hungary	2nd	
1983	World Championships	Helsinki, Finland	2nd	20.70 m
