= Svetlana Krachevskaya =

Soviet shot putter

Svetlana Dolzhenko-Krachevskaya
Personal information
- Native name: Светлана Ивановна Долженко-Крачевская
- Full name: Svetlana Ivanovna Dolzhenko-Krachevskaya
- Born: Shyroke, Odesa, Ukraine
- Height: 5 ft 8 in (173 cm)
- Weight: 183 lb (83 kg)

Sport
- Country: Soviet Union
- Sport: Women's Track and Field
- Event: Shot put
- Club: Dynamo Moskva, Moskva
Medal record
Women's athletics
Representing Soviet Union
Olympic Games
Silver medal – second place	1980 Moscow	Shot put
European Indoor Championships
Silver medal – second place	1976 Munich	Shot put
- Updated on 20 February 2015

Svetlana Ivanovna Dolzhenko-Krachevskaya (Russian: Светлана Ивановна Долженко-Крачевская; Ukrainian: Світлана Іванівна Крачевська; née Esfir Dolzhenko (Эсфирь Долженко); November 23, 1944) is a Soviet athlete who competed mainly in the shot put.

She is Jewish, and was born in Shyroke, Odesa, Ukraine. She competed for the Soviet Union in the 1980 Summer Olympics held in Moscow, Soviet Union in the shot put, where she won the silver medal.

== Achievements ==
Year	Competition	Venue	Position	Notes
Representing Soviet Union
1972	Olympic Games	Munich, West Germany	4th	19.24 m
1976	Olympic Games	Montreal, Canada	9th	18.36 m
1980	Olympic Games	Moscow, Soviet Union	2nd	21.42 m

== See also ==
- List of select Jewish track and field athletes
