= Ivanka Petrova =

Bulgarian shot putter

Personal information
- Born: February 3, 1951 Pernik, Bulgaria
- Died: February 18, 2007 (aged 56) Sofia, Bulgaria

Sport
- Sport: Track and field

Ivanka Petrova-Stoycheva (Bulgarian: Иванка Петрова-Стойчева; February 3, 1951 – February 18, 2007) is a retired track and field shot putter from Bulgaria, best known for competing at the 1980 Summer Olympics in Moscow, USSR. There she ended up in 11th place, with a distance of 18.34 metres.
