= Gael Martin =

Australian shot putter, discus thrower and powerlifter

Personal information
- Full name: Gael Patricia Mulhall-Martin
- Nationality: Australia
- Born: 27 August 1956 (age 69) Melbourne
- Height: 175 cm (5 ft 9 in)
- Weight: 98 kg (216 lb)

Sport
- Country: Australia
- Sport: Athletics
- Event: Shot put
Medal record
Women's athletics
Representing Australia
Olympic Games
Bronze medal – third place	1984 Los Angeles	Shot put
Commonwealth Games
Gold medal – first place	1978 Edmonton	Shot Put
Gold medal – first place	1986 Edinburgh	Shot Put
Gold medal – first place	1986 Edinburgh	Discus
Silver medal – second place	1978 Edmonton	Discus
Silver medal – second place	1982 Brisbane	Shot Put
Silver medal – second place	1982 Brisbane	Discus
Women's powerlifting
IPF Women's World Powerlifting Championships
Silver medal – second place	1981 Honolulu	+82.5 kg
Gold medal – first place	1983 Adelaide	90 kg
Silver medal – second place	1988 Brussels	+90 kg

Gael Patricia Mulhall-Martin, née Mulhall, (27 August 1956) is a former Australian athlete who competed in the shot put and in the discus throw at the Olympic level and also had a career in powerlifting.

== Athletics ==
Born in Melbourne, Mulhall-Martin is daughter of footballer Ken Mulhall, an Australian rules footballer with the St Kilda Football Club.

She won the bronze medal in women's shot put at the 1984 Summer Olympics held in Los Angeles, United States, becoming the first Australian (male or female) to win an Olympic medal in a throwing event.

Mulhall also competed in four successive Commonwealth Games events from 1974, winning double gold in Shot Put and Discus at the 1986 Commonwealth Games in Edinburgh.

Coached by Franz Stampfl, she won a total of 20 senior Australian national championships in her career.

At the 1981 Pan Pacific Conference Games she tested positive for the use of anabolic steroids and received an 18-month ban for cheating.

== Powerlifting ==
Gael Martin represented Australia in the Women's World Powerlifting Championships in 1981, 1983 and 1988. In 1987, Martin received a grant from the ACT Talented Athletes Development Awards program. The higher level grant, which Martin received, was awarded to applicants with international ranking and the support of their sporting organisation.
