= Claudia Losch =

German shot putter (born 1960)

Personal information
- Born: 10 January 1960 (age 66) Wanne-Eickel, North Rhine-Westphalia, West Germany
- Height: 1.81 m (5 ft 11 in)
- Weight: 84 kg (185 lb)

Sport
- Sport: Shot put
- Club: TV 1860 Fürth; LC Olympiapark München
Medal record
Representing West Germany
Olympic Games
Gold medal – first place	1984 Los Angeles	Shot put
World Indoor Championships
Gold medal – first place	1989 Budapest	Shot put
Bronze medal – third place	1987 Indianapolis	Shot put
European Indoor Championships
Gold medal – first place	1986 Madrid	Shot put
Gold medal – first place	1988 Budapest	Shot put
Gold medal – first place	1990 Glasgow	Shot put
Silver medal – second place	1984 Gothenburg	Shot put
Silver medal – second place	1985 Piraeus	Shot put
Summer Universiade
Silver medal – second place	1983 Edmonton	Shot put

Claudia Losch (born 10 January 1960) is a retired German shot putter. She is the 1984 Olympic Champion. Shortly after the Olympics, she competed in the shot put at the Friendship Games in Prague, which were held as an event for sportspeople from Communist countries who were boycotting that year's Olympics: she was unable to repeat her Olympic medal success there. At the 1988 Olympic Games, she finished fifth. She is also the 1989 World Indoor Champion and won the European Indoor title three times.

Losch won the German indoor championship in the shot put: 1983, 1984, 1987, 1988, and 1989. She won the German championship nine consecutive seasons (1982–1990).

== International competitions ==
Year	Competition	Venue	Position	Event	Notes
1983	World Championships	Helsinki, Finland	7th	19.72 m	
1984	European Indoor Championships	Gothenburg, Sweden	2nd	20.23 m	
1984	Olympic Games	Los Angeles, United States	1st	20.48 m	
1985	European Indoor Championships	Athens, Greece	2nd	20.59 m	
1986	European Indoor Championships	Madrid, Spain	1st	20.48 m	
1986	European Championships	Stuttgart, West Germany	4th	20.54 m	
1987	World Indoor Championships	Indianapolis, United States	3rd	20.14 m	
1987	World Championships	Rome, Italy	4th	20.73 m	
1988	European Indoor Championships	Budapest, Hungary	1st	20.39 m	
1988	Olympic Games	Seoul, South Korea	5th	20.27 m	
1989	World Indoor Championships	Budapest, Hungary	1st	20.45 m	
1990	European Indoor Championships	Glasgow, Scotland	1st	20.64 m	
1990	European Championships	Split, Yugoslavia	4th	19.92 m	
1991	World Championships	Tokyo, Japan	4th	19.74 m	
