= Mihaela Loghin =

Romanian shot putter

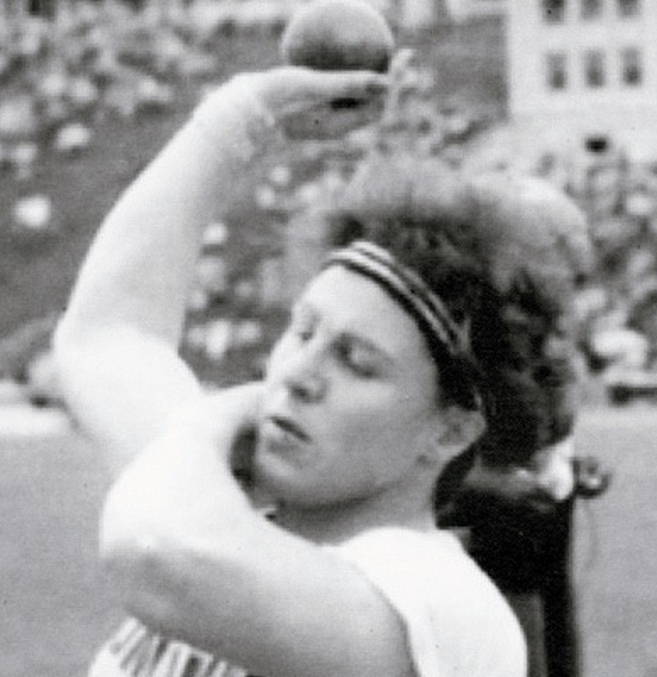

Personal information
- Born: 1 June 1952 (age 74) Roman, Romania
- Height: 1.70 m (5 ft 7 in)
- Weight: 78 kg (172 lb)

Sport
- Country: Romania
- Sport: Athletics
- Event: Shot put
- Club: University of Bucharest; CSA Steaua București
- Coached by: Ioan Sabau

Achievements and titles
- Personal best: 21.00 m (1984)
Medal record
Representing Romania
Olympic Games
| Silver medal – second place | 1984 Los Angeles | Shot put |
European Indoor Championships
| Bronze medal – third place | 1986 Madrid | Shot put |
Universiade
| Silver medal – second place | 1975 Rome | Shot put |
| Bronze medal – third place | 1979 Mexico City | Shot put |

Mihaela Loghin (born 1 June 1952) is a shot putter from Romania. She won a silver medal at the 1984 Olympics, one centimetre behind Claudia Losch, and a bronze medal at the 1986 European Indoor Championships.

After retiring from competitions in 1991, Loghin taught physical education, first at a school in Focsani and since 1992 at a military academy.

She has continued to compete in Masters athletics, setting the world record in the W60 division on 9 June 2012 at a meet in Bucharest.
