= Nunu Abashydze =

Ukrainian shot putter

Personal information
- Born: 27 March 1955 (age 71) Novovolynsk, Soviet Union

Sport
- Sport: Track and field
Medal record
Representing Soviet Union
World Indoor Championships
Bronze medal – third place	1985 Paris	Shot put
European Championships
Bronze medal – third place	1982 Athens	Shot put

Nunu Dzhansuhivna Abashydze Mislayeva (Ukrainian: Нуну Джансугівна Абашидзе; born 27 March 1955) is a retired track and field shot putter from Ukraine, best known for winning the bronze medal for the Soviet Union in the women's shot put event at the 1982 European Championships. She set her personal best (21.53 m) on 20 June 1984 at a meet in Kiev. In 1979 she was granted the title of Master of Sport of the USSR, International Class.

== Biography ==
Abashydze was born on 27 March 1955 in the city of Novovolynsk, which was then part of the Ukrainian SSR in the Soviet Union. She started competing in athletics in 1967 under coach V. Grin, and in 1973 she began to compete for the club Dynamo under coach Y. Domovsky in Odesa. In 1978, she joined the national team of the USSR in shotput.

In 1981, she was briefly suspended after failing a doping test by World Athletics. A year later while suspended she graduated from the Odesa National Medical University. In 1986, she moved to Canada, and later became a Canadian citizen.

== Achievements ==
Year	Competition	Venue	Position	Notes
Representing Soviet Union
1980	Olympic Games	Moscow, Soviet Union	4th	
1982	European Championships	Athens, Greece	3rd	
1983	World Championships	Helsinki, Finland	4th	20.55 m
1985	World Indoor Games	Paris, France	3rd	
1986	European Championships	Stuttgart, West Germany	6th	
