= Verzhiniya Veselinova =

Bulgarian shot putter

Personal information
- Born: November 18, 1957 (age 68) Asenovgrad, Plovdiv, Bulgaria

Sport
- Sport: Track and field
Medal record
Representing Bulgaria
European Indoor Championships
Gold medal – first place	1982 Milan	Shot put

Verzhiniya Ivanova Veselinova-Ignatova (Bulgarian: Вержиния Иванова Веселинова-Игнатова; born November 18, 1957) is a retired track and field shot putter from Bulgaria, best known for competing at the 1980 Summer Olympics in Moscow, USSR. There she ended up in fifth place, with a distance of 20.72 metres.

== Achievements ==
Year	Competition	Venue	Position	Notes
Representing Bulgaria
1980	Olympic Games	Moscow, Soviet Union	5th	
1982	European Indoor Championships	Milan, Italy	1st	
1982	European Championships	Athens, Greece	5th	
