= Ilona Slupianek =

East German shot putter (born 1956)

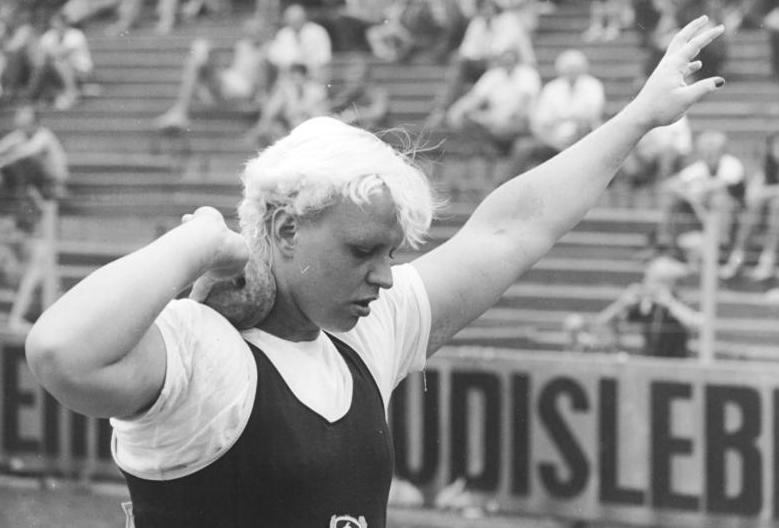
- Ilona Slupianek in 1981

Personal information
- Nationality: German
- Born: Ilona Schoknecht; 24 September 1956 (age 69) Demmin, Bezirk Neubrandenburg, East Germany
- Height: 1.80 m (5 ft 11 in)
- Weight: 93 kg (205 lb)
- Spouse: Hartmut Briesenick

Sport
- Country: East Germany
- Sport: athletics
- Event: Shot put
- Club: SC Dynamo Berlin

Achievements and titles
- Personal best: 22.45 m (1980)
Medal record
Women's athletics
Representing East Germany
Olympic Games
Gold medal – first place	1980 Moscow	Shot put
World Championships
Bronze medal – third place	1983 Helsinki	Shot put
World Indoor Championships
Silver medal – second place	1987 Indianapolis	Shot put
European Championships
Gold medal – first place	1978 Prague	Shot put
Gold medal – first place	1982 Athens	Shot put
European Indoor Championships
Gold medal – first place	1979 Vienna	Shot put
Gold medal – first place	1981 Grenoble	Shot put
Silver medal – second place	1977 San Sebastián	Shot put
Bronze medal – third place	1976 Munich	Shot put
IAAF World Cup
Gold medal – first place	1977 Düsseldorf	Shot put
Gold medal – first place	1979 Montréal	Shot put
Gold medal – first place	1981 Rome	Shot put
Universiade
Gold medal – first place	1979 Mexico City	Shot put

Ilona Longo (née Schoknecht, divorced Briesenick and Slupianek; born 24 September 1956) is a German former shot putter who represented East Germany. As Ilona Slupianek, she won the 1980 Olympic title in Moscow and won European titles in 1978 and 1982. She is also a seven-time GDR champion. She twice broke the world record with puts of 22.36 metres and 22.45 metres in 1980. She was suspended for a year for doping.

== Career ==
Born in Demmin, in the East German Bezirk Neubrandenburg, as Ilona Schoknecht she finished fifth at the 1976 Montreal Olympics with 20.54m. In 1977, she was disqualified after she tested positive for anabolic steroids at the European Cup meeting in Helsinki, where she dominated her event with a superlative 21.20.

The International Amateur Athletics Federation suspended Slupianek for 12 months, a penalty that ended two days before the 1978 European championships in Prague. In the reverse of what the IAAF hoped, sending her home to East Germany meant she was free to train unchecked with anabolic steroids, if she wanted to, and then compete for another gold medal. Now competing as Ilona Slupianek, she did win the gold medal in Prague, with a put of 21.41m. She went on to win the European Indoor title in 1979. She then won the gold medal at the 1980 Summer Olympics in Moscow. In the next years she obtained gold at the European Indoor Championships in 1981 and the European Championships in 1982, followed by a bronze medal at the 1983 World Championships.

In 1984, she married fellow GDR shot putter Hartmut Briesenick. Competing as Ilona Briesenick, she won her final major medal when winning silver at the 1987 World Indoor Championships.

From 1976 to 1986 she was a deputy in the East German legislature, the Volkskammer, for the FDJ. She married for the third time in 2008. As of 2013, she lives in Italy. She had one daughter with Briesenick.

== See also ==
- List of doping cases in athletics

Records
Preceded by Helena Fibingerová	Women's shot put World Record Holder; 2 May 1980 – 27 May 1984	Succeeded by Natalya Lisovskaya
Awards
Preceded by Marita Koch	Women's Track & Field Athlete of the Year; 1980	Succeeded by Evelyn Ashford
