= Elena Stoyanova =

Bulgarian shot putter

Personal information
- Born: January 23, 1952 (age 74) Krasen, Dobrich Province, Bulgaria

Sport
- Sport: Track and field
Medal record
Representing Bulgaria
Summer Universiade
Gold medal – first place	1975 Rome	Shot put
Gold medal – first place	1977 Sofia	Shot put
Silver medal – second place	1973 Moscow	Shot put

Elena Simeonova Stoyanova (Bulgarian: Елена Симеонова Стоянова; born January 23, 1952) is a retired track and field shot putter from Bulgaria, best known for competing at three consecutive Summer Olympics for her native country: 1972, 1976 and 1980. Her best Olympic results was finishing in sixth place at the 1980 Summer Olympics in Moscow, USSR, with a distance of 20.22 metres.

== Achievements ==
Year	Competition	Venue	Position	Notes
Representing Bulgaria
1972	Olympic Games	Munich, West Germany	8th	
1976	Olympic Games	Montreal, Canada	8th	18.89 m
1980	Olympic Games	Moscow, Soviet Union	6th	
1982	European Championships	Athens, Greece	4th	
