= Shot put =

Track and field event

Athletics Shot put
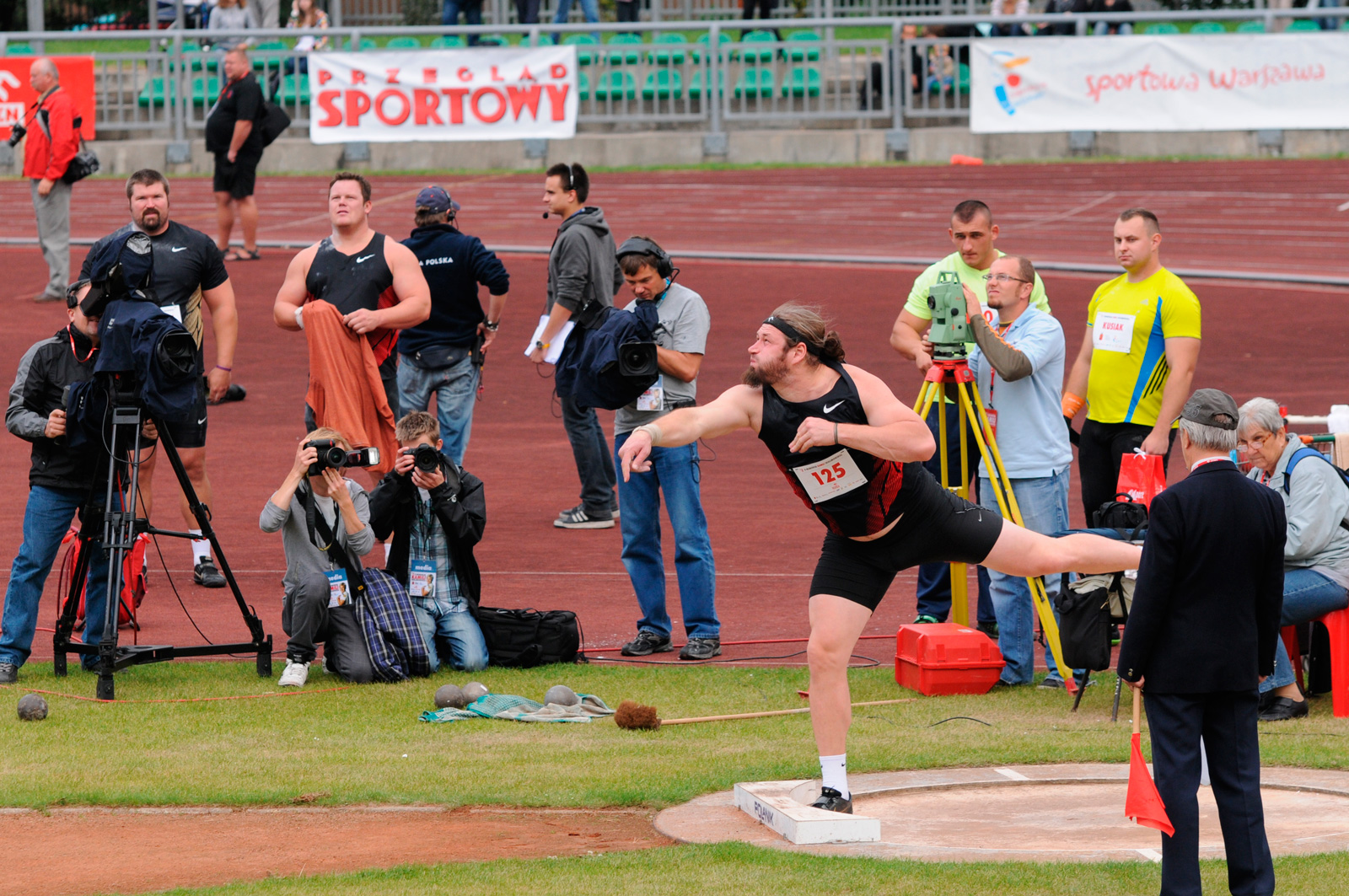
- Polish double Olympic champion Tomasz Majewski

World records
- Men: (United States) Ryan Crouser 23.56 m (77 ft 3 1/2 in) (2023)
- Women: (Soviet Union) Natalya Lisovskaya 22.63 m (74 ft 2 3/4 in) (1987)

Olympic records
- Men: (United States) Ryan Crouser 23.30 m (76 ft 5 1/4 in) (2021)
- Women: (East Germany) Ilona Slupianek 22.41 m (73 ft 6 1/4 in) (1980)

World Championship records
- Men: (United States) Ryan Crouser 23.51 m (77 ft 1 1/2 in) (2023)
- Women: (Soviet Union) Natalya Lisovskaya 21.24 m (69 ft 8 in) (1987) (New Zealand) Valerie Adams 21.24 m (69 ft 8 in) (2011)

World Indoor Championship records
- Men: (United States) Ryan Crouser 22.77 m (74 ft 8 1/4 in) (2024)
- Women: (New Zealand) Valerie Adams 20.67 m (67 ft 9 3/4 in) (2014)

The shot put is a track and field event involving "putting" (or throwing) a heavy spherical ball—the shot—as far as possible. For men, the sport has been a part of the modern Olympics since their revival in 1896, and women's competition began in 1948. The shot put is part of the most common combined events: the men's decathlon, the women's and men's heptathlon and the women's pentathlon.

== History ==
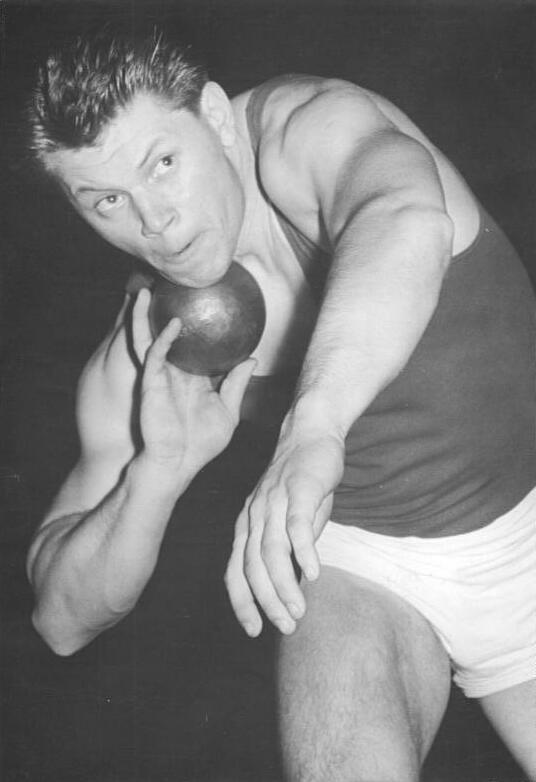
Czechoslovak shot putter Plíhal at the 1957 East German Indoor Athletics Championships

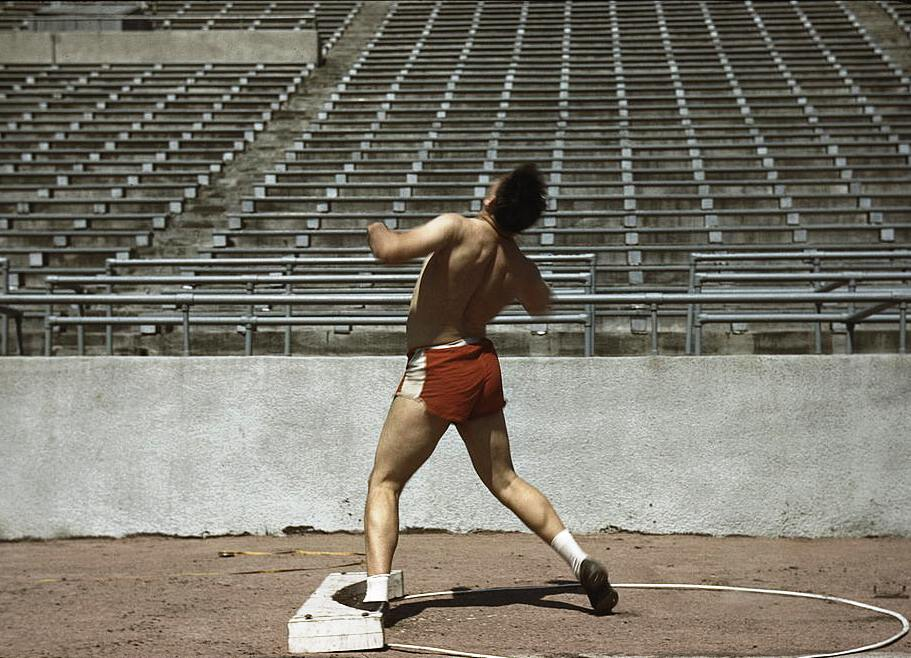
Shot putter at the University of Nebraska (1942), showing the circle and stop board

The ancient Greek poet Homer mentions competitions in rock throwing by soldiers during the siege of Troy, but there is no record of any weights being thrown in Greek competitions. The first evidence for stone- or weight-throwing events was in the Scottish Highlands, and dates back to about the 1st century. The 16th-century English king Henry VIII was noted for his prowess in court competitions of weight and hammer throwing.

The first events resembling the modern shot put likely occurred in the Middle Ages when soldiers held competitions in which they hurled cannonballs. Shot put competitions were first recorded in early 19th century Scotland, and were a part of the British Amateur Championships beginning in 1866.

Competitors take their throw from inside a marked circle 2.135 metres (7 ft) in diameter, with a "toe board" or "stop board" 10 centimetres (4 in) high at the front of the circle. The distance thrown is measured from the inside of the circumference of the circle to the nearest mark made on the ground by the falling shot, with distances rounded down to the nearest centimetre under IAAF and WMA rules.

=== Legal throws ===
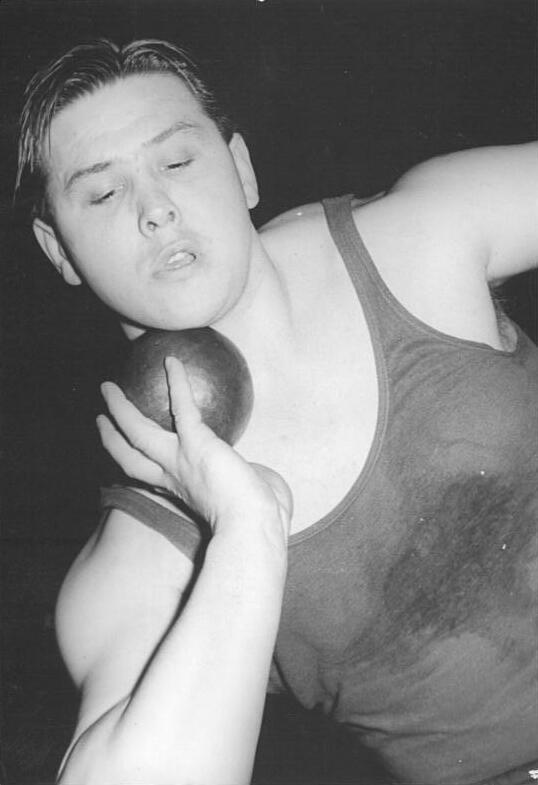
Czechoslovak shot putter Jiří Skobla showing the correct technique for keeping the shot near the neck

The following rules (indoor and outdoor) must be adhered to for a legal throw:

- Upon calling the athlete's name, the athlete may choose any part of the throwing circle to enter inside. They have one minute to commence the throwing motion; otherwise it counts as a forfeit for the current round.
- The athlete may not wear gloves; IAAF rules permit the taping of individual fingers.
- The athlete must rest the shot close to the neck, and keep it tight to the neck or the chin throughout the motion.
- The shot must be released above the height of the shoulder, using only one hand.
- The athlete may touch the inside surface of the circle or toe board, but must not touch the top or outside of the circle or toe board, or the ground beyond the circle. Limbs may, however, extend over the lines of the circle in the air.
- The shot must land in the throwing sector, which is a circular sector of 34.92° centered on the throwing circle. The throwing sector has been narrowed multiple times over the years to improve safety, most recently in 2004 from 40°. The current throwing sector angle (34.92°) was chosen because it provides a sector whose bounds are easy to measure and lay out on a field (10 metres out from the center of the ring, 6 metres across).
- The athlete must leave the throwing circle from the back half.

Foul throws occur when an athlete:

- Does not pause within the circle before beginning the putting motion.
- Does not complete the putting movement initiated within sixty seconds of having their name called.
- Allows the shot to drop below their shoulder or outside the vertical plane of their shoulder during the put, or does not keep the shot close to the neck until its release.
- During the putting motion, touches with any part of the body (including shoes):
  - the top or ends of the toe board
  - the top of the iron ring
  - anywhere outside the circle.
- Puts a shot which either falls outside the throwing sector or touches a sector line on the initial impact.
- Leaves the circle before the shot has landed.
- Does not leave from the rear half of the circle.

== Competition ==
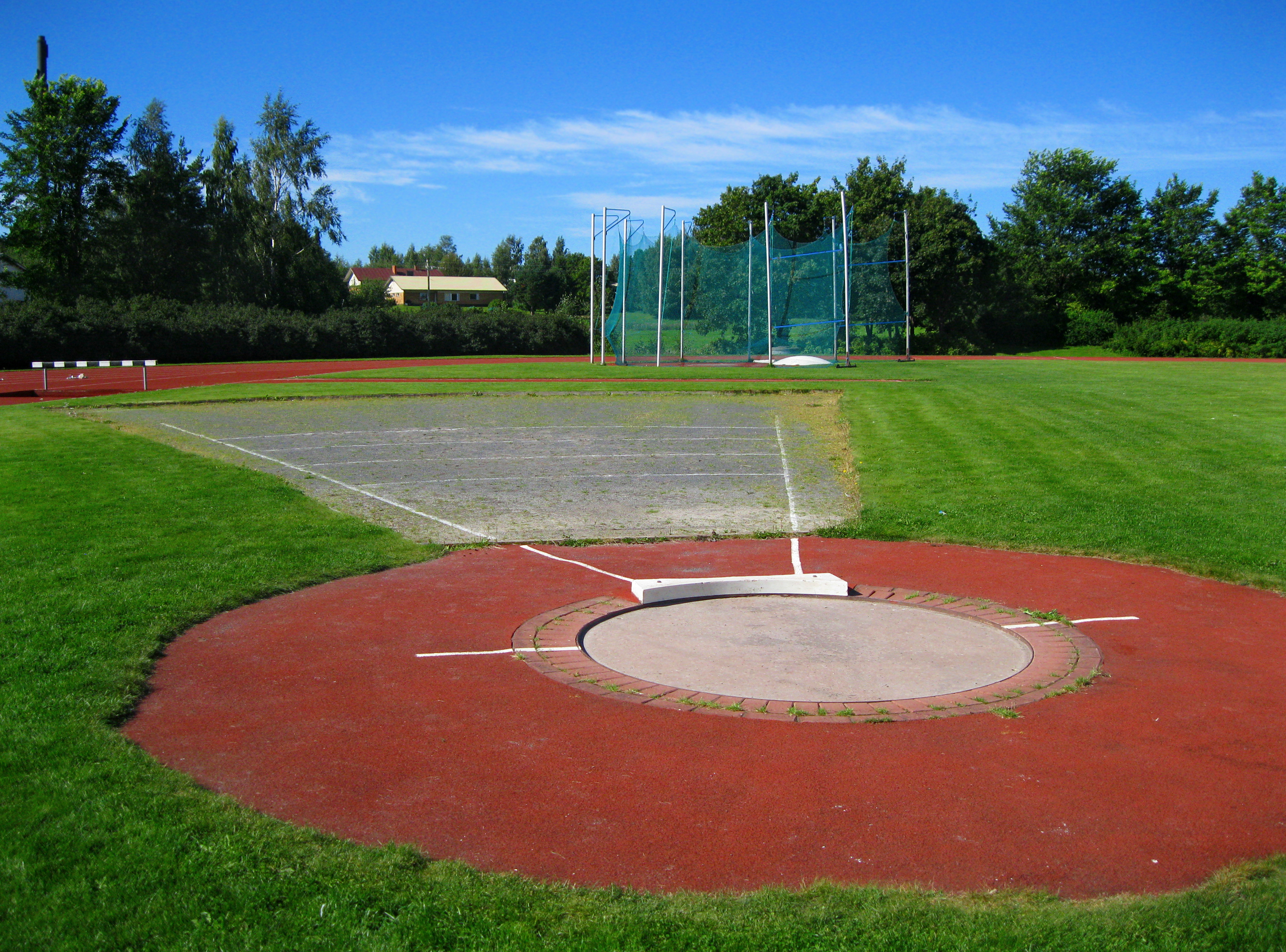
Shot put area

Shot put competitions have been held at the modern Summer Olympic Games since their inception in 1896, and it is also included as an event in the World Athletics Championships.

Each of these competitions in the modern era have a set number of rounds of throws. Typically there are three qualification rounds to determine qualification for the final. There are then three preliminary rounds in the final with the top eight competitors receiving a further three throws. Each competitor in the final is credited with their longest throw, regardless of whether it was achieved in the preliminary or final three rounds. The competitor with the longest legal put is declared the winner.

=== Weight ===
In open competitions the men's shot weighs 7.26 kilograms (16 lb), and the women's shot weighs 4 kilograms (8.82 lb). Junior, school, and masters competitions often use different weights of shots, typically below the weights of those used in open competitions; the individual rules for each competition should be consulted in order to determine the correct weights to be used.

== Putting styles ==
Two putting styles are in current general use by shot put competitors: the glide and the spin. With all putting styles, the goal is to release the shot with maximum forward velocity at an angle of slightly less than forty-five degrees.

=== Glide ===
The origin of this technique dates to 1951, when Parry O'Brien from the United States invented a technique that involved the putter facing backwards, rotating 180 degrees across the circle, and then tossing the shot. Unlike spin, this technique is a linear movement.

With this technique, a right-hand thrower would begin facing the rear of the circle. They would typically adopt a specific type of crouch, involving their bent right leg, in order to begin the throw from a more beneficial posture whilst also isometrically preloading their muscles. The positioning of their bodyweight over their bent leg, which pushes upwards with equal force, generates a preparatory isometric press. The force generated by this press will be channelled into the subsequent throw making it more powerful. To initiate the throw they kick to the front with the left leg, while pushing off forcefully with the right. As the thrower crosses the circle, the hips twist toward the front, the left arm is swung out then pulled back tight, followed by the shoulders, and they then strike in a putting motion with their right arm. The key is to move quickly across the circle with as little air under the feet as possible, hence the name 'glide'.

=== Spin ===
Demonstration of the spin technique in shot put

This is also known as the rotational technique. It was first practiced in Europe in the 1950s but did not receive much attention until the 1970s. In 1972, Aleksandr Baryshnikov set his first USSR record using a new putting style, the spin ("круговой мах" in Russian), invented by his coach Viktor Alexeyev. The spin involves rotating like a discus thrower and using rotational momentum for power. In 1976 Baryshnikov went on to set a world record of 22.00 m (72.18 ft) with his spin style, and was the first shot putter to cross the 22-meter mark.

With this technique, a right-hand thrower faces the rear, and begins to spin on the ball of the left foot. The thrower comes around and faces the front of the circle and drives the right foot into the center of the circle. Finally, the thrower reaches for the front of the circle with the left foot, twisting the hips and shoulders like in the glide, and puts the shot.

When the athlete executes the spin, the upper body is twisted hard to the right, so the imaginary lines created by the shoulders and hips are no longer parallel. This action builds up torque, and stretches the muscles, creating an involuntary elasticity in the muscles, providing extra power and momentum. When the athlete prepares to release, the left foot is firmly planted, causing the momentum and energy generated to be conserved, pushing the shot in an upward and outward direction.

Another purpose of the spin is to build up a high rotational speed, by swinging the right leg initially, then to bring all the limbs in tightly, similar to a figure skater bringing in their arms while spinning to increase their speed. Once this fast speed is achieved the shot is released, transferring the energy into the shot put.

Until 2016, a woman had never made an Olympic final (top 8) using the spin technique. The first woman to enter a final and win a medal at the Olympics was Anita Márton.

Ryan Crouser, the current men's world record holder, added an additional move, the "Crouser Slide", to his spin technique. He used this technique to set the world record at the Los Angeles Grand Prix in 2023.

=== Cartwheel ===
A vertical spinning technique where the athlete does a cartwheel on one hand before releasing the shot. It is currently banned in major competitions.

=== Usage ===
Currently, most top male shot putters use the spin. However the glide remains popular since the technique leads to greater consistency compared to the rotational technique. Almost all throwers start by using the glide. Tomasz Majewski notes that although most athletes use the spin, he and some other top shot putters achieved success using this classic method (for example he became the first to defend the Olympic title in 56 years).

The world record and the next six best male results (23.37, 23.30, 23.15, and 23.12 by Ryan Crouser, 23.23 by Joe Kovacs, and 23.12 and 23.10 by Randy Barnes) were completed with the spin technique, while the eighth-best all-time put of 23.06 m (75 ft 7 3/4 in) by Ulf Timmermann was completed with the glide technique.

The decision to glide or spin may need to be decided on an individual basis, determined by the thrower's size and power. Short throwers may benefit from the spin and taller throwers may benefit from the glide, but many throwers do not follow this guideline.

== Types of shot ==
The shot is made of different kinds of materials depending on its intended use. Materials used include sand, iron, cast iron, solid steel, stainless steel, brass, and synthetic materials like polyvinyl. Some metals are more dense than others, making the size of the shot vary. For example, different materials are used to make indoor and outdoor shot – because damage to surroundings must be taken into account – so the latter are smaller. There are various size and weight standards for the implement that depend on the age and gender of the competitors as well as the national customs of the governing body.

== World records ==
The current world record holders are:

Type	Athlete	Mark	Date	Place
Men
Outdoor	Ryan Crouser	23.56 m (77 ft 3 1/2 in)	27 May 2023	Los Angeles, USA
Indoor	Ryan Crouser	22.82 m (74 ft 10 1/4 in)	24 January 2021	Fayetteville, Arkansas, USA
Women
Outdoor	Natalya Lisovskaya	22.63 m (74 ft 2 3/4 in)	7 June 1987	Moscow, USSR
Indoor	Helena Fibingerová	22.50 m (73 ft 9 3/4 in)	19 February 1977	Jablonec, CZE

== Area records ==
- Updated 4 September 2026.

Area	Men			Women		
Area	Mark	Season	Athlete	Mark	Season	Athlete
Africa (records)	22.10 m (72 ft 6 in)	2025	Chukwuebuka Enekwechi (NGR)	18.50 m (60 ft 8 1/4 in) i	2026	Jessica Oji (NGR)
Asia (records)	21.80 m (71 ft 6 1/4 in)	2024	Mohammed Tolo (KSA)	21.76 m (71 ft 4 1/2 in)	1988	Li Meisu (CHN)
Europe (records)	23.06 m (75 ft 7 3/4 in)	1988	Ulf Timmermann (GDR)	22.63 m (74 ft 2 3/4 in) WR	1987	Natalya Lisovskaya (URS)
North, Central America and Caribbean (records)	23.56 m (77 ft 3 1/2 in) WR	2023	Ryan Crouser (USA)	21.14 m (69 ft 4 1/4 in)	2026	Chase Jackson (USA)
Oceania (records)	22.90 m (75 ft 1 1/2 in)	2019	Tom Walsh (NZL)	21.24 m (69 ft 8 in)	2011	Valerie Adams (NZL)
South America (records)	22.61 m (74 ft 2 in)	2019	Darlan Romani (BRA)	19.30 m (63 ft 3 3/4 in) A	2001	Elisângela Adriano (BRA)

== All-time top 25 ==
Outdoor tables show data for two definitions of "Top 25" - the top 25 shot put marks and the top 25 athletes:

- yellow background denotes top performance for athletes in the top 25 shot put marks
- normal coloured background denotes lesser performances, still in the top 25 shot put marks, by repeat athletes
- green background denotes top performance (only) for other top 25 athletes who fall outside the top 25 shot put marks

=== Men (outdoor) ===
- Correct as of September 2026.

Ath.#	Perf.#	Mark	Technique	Athlete	Nation	Date	Place	Ref.
1	1	23.56 m (77 ft 3 1/2 in)	spin	Ryan Crouser	United States	27 May 2023	Los Angeles	
	2	23.51 m (77 ft 1 1/2 in)		Crouser #2		19 August 2023	Budapest	
	3	23.37 m (76 ft 8 in)		Crouser #3		18 June 2021	Eugene	
	4	23.30 m (76 ft 5 1/4 in)		Crouser #4		5 August 2021	Tokyo	
2	5	23.23 m (76 ft 2 1/2 in)	spin	Joe Kovacs	United States	7 September 2022	Zürich	
	6	23.15 m (75 ft 11 1/4 in)		Crouser #5		21 August 2021	Eugene	
	7	23.13 m (75 ft 10 1/2 in)		Kovacs #2		25 May 2024	Eugene	
3	8	23.12 m (75 ft 10 in)	spin	Randy Barnes	United States	20 May 1990	Westwood	
	8	23.12 m (75 ft 10 in)		Crouser #6		24 June 2022	Eugene	
	10	23.10 m (75 ft 9 1/4 in)		Barnes #2		26 May 1990	San Jose	
4	11	23.08 m (75 ft 8 1/2 in)	spin	Rajindra Campbell	Jamaica	5 September 2026	Brussels	
	12	23.07 m (75 ft 8 1/4 in)		Crouser #7		23 July 2023	London	
5	13	23.06 m (75 ft 7 3/4 in)	glide	Ulf Timmermann	East Germany	22 May 1988	Chania	
	14	23.02 m (75 ft 6 1/4 in)		Crouser #8		28 May 2022	Eugene	
	15	23.01 m (75 ft 5 3/4 in)		Crouser #9		22 May 2021	Tucson	
6	16	22.98 m (75 ft 4 1/2 in)	spin	Leonardo Fabbri	Italy	14 September 2024	Brussels	
	17	22.95 m (75 ft 3 1/2 in)		Fabbri #2		15 May 2024	Savona	
	18	22.94 m (75 ft 3 in)		Crouser #10		17 July 2022	Eugene	
	19	22.93 m (75 ft 2 3/4 in)		Kovacs #3		17 September 2023	Eugene	
	19	22.93 m (75 ft 2 3/4 in)		Crouser #11		7 September 2024	Zagreb	
	19	22.93 m (75 ft 2 3/4 in)		Kovacs #4		18 May 2024	Los Angeles	
	22	22.92 m (75 ft 2 1/4 in)		Crouser #12		18 June 2021	Eugene	
7	23	22.91 m (75 ft 1 3/4 in)	glide	Alessandro Andrei	Italy	12 August 1987	Viareggio	
	23	22.91 m (75 ft 1 3/4 in)		Kovacs #5		5 October 2019	Doha	
	23	22.91 m (75 ft 1 3/4 in)		Crouser #13		18 July 2020	Marietta	
	23	22.91 m (75 ft 1 3/4 in)		Crouser #14		17 September 2023	Eugene	
	23	22.91 m (75 ft 1 3/4 in)		Fabbri #3		23 May 2024	Asti	
8		22.90 m (75 ft 1 1/2 in)	spin	Tom Walsh	New Zealand	5 October 2019	Doha	
9		22.86 m (75 ft 0 in) A	spin	Brian Oldfield	United States	10 May 1975	El Paso	
10		22.75 m (74 ft 7 1/2 in)	glide	Werner Günthör	Switzerland	23 August 1988	Bern	
11		22.67 m (74 ft 4 1/2 in)	spin	Kevin Toth	United States	19 April 2003	Lawrence	
12		22.64 m (74 ft 3 1/4 in)	glide	Udo Beyer	East Germany	20 August 1986	Berlin	
13		22.61 m (74 ft 2 in)	spin	Darlan Romani	Brazil	30 June 2019	Stanford	
14		22.59 m (74 ft 1 1/4 in)	spin	Payton Otterdahl	United States	24 April 2024	Des Moines	
15		22.54 m (73 ft 11 1/4 in)	spin	Christian Cantwell	United States	5 June 2004	Gresham	
16		22.53 m (73 ft 11 in)	spin	Jordan Geist	United States	27 August 2026	Zurich	
17		22.52 m (73 ft 10 1/2 in)	glide	John Brenner	United States	26 April 1987	Walnut	
18		22.51 m (73 ft 10 in)	spin	Adam Nelson	United States	18 May 2002	Portland	
19		22.47 m (73 ft 8 1/2 in)	spin	Josh Awotunde	United States	3 August 2025	Eugene	
20		22.44 m (73 ft 7 1/4 in)	spin	Darrell Hill	United States	31 August 2017	Brussels	
20		22.44 m (73 ft 7 1/4 in)	spin	Zane Weir	Italy	3 September 2023	Padua	
22		22.43 m (73 ft 7 in)	spin	Reese Hoffa	United States	3 August 2007	London	
23		22.32 m (73 ft 2 1/2 in)	spin	Michał Haratyk	Poland	28 July 2019	Warsaw	
24		22.29 m (73 ft 1 1/2 in)	spin	Tripp Piperi	United States	3 August 2025	Eugene	
25		22.28 m (73 ft 1 in)	spin	Ryan Whiting	United States	10 May 2013	Doha	

==== Notable throws and series ====
- Ryan Crouser threw 23.12 in Eugene, Oregon on 24 June 2022. 23.01, 23.11 and 22.98 (ancillary throws) were recorded for his remaining attempts. This was the first time the 23-metre barrier has been broken more than once in a series.
- Crouser also threw a series of 23.23, 23.31, 22.94, 23.56, 22.80 and 22.86 in Los Angeles, California on 27 May 2023 to break again the 23-metre mark three times in a series.

=== Women (outdoor) ===
- Correct as of April 2022.

Ath.#	Perf.#	Mark	Technique	Athlete	Nation	Date	Place	Ref.
1	1	22.63 m (74 ft 2 3/4 in)	glide	Natalya Lisovskaya	Soviet Union	7 June 1987	Moscow	
	2	22.60 m (74 ft 1 3/4 in)		Lisovskaya #2		7 June 1987	Moscow	
	3	22.55 m (73 ft 11 3/4 in)		Lisovskaya #3		5 July 1988	Tallinn	
	4	22.53 m (73 ft 11 in)		Lisovskaya #4		27 May 1984	Sochi	
	4	22.53 m (73 ft 11 in)		Lisovskaya #5		14 August 1988	Kyiv	
2	6	22.45 m (73 ft 7 3/4 in)	glide	Ilona Slupianek	East Germany	11 May 1980	Potsdam	
	7	22.41 m (73 ft 6 1/4 in)		Slupianek #2		24 July 1980	Moscow	
	8	22.40 m (73 ft 5 3/4 in)		Slupianek #3		3 June 1983	Berlin	
	9	22.38 m (73 ft 5 in)		Slupianek #4		25 May 1980	Karl-Marx-Stadt	
	10	22.36 m (73 ft 4 1/4 in)		Slupianek #5		2 May 1980	Celje	
	11	22.34 m (73 ft 3 1/2 in)		Slupianek #6		7 May 1980	Berlin	
	11	22.34 m (73 ft 3 1/2 in)		Slupianek #7		18 July 1980	Cottbus	
3	13	22.32 m (73 ft 2 1/2 in)	glide	Helena Fibingerová	Czechoslovakia	20 August 1977	Nitra	
	14	22.24 m (72 ft 11 1/2 in)		Lisovskaya #6		1 October 1988	Seoul	
	15	22.22 m (72 ft 10 3/4 in)		Slupianek #8		13 July 1980	Potsdam	
4	16	22.19 m (72 ft 9 1/2 in)	glide	Claudia Losch	West Germany	23 August 1987	Hainfeld	
	17	22.13 m (72 ft 7 1/4 in)		Slupianek #9		29 April 1980	Split	
	18	22.06 m (72 ft 4 1/2 in)		Lisovskaya #7		6 August 1988	Moscow	
	19	22.05 m (72 ft 4 in)		Slupianek #10		28 May 1980	Berlin	
	19	22.05 m (72 ft 4 in)		Slupianek #11		31 May 1980	Potsdam	
	21	22.04 m (72 ft 3 1/2 in)		Slupianek #12		4 July 1979	Potsdam	
	21	22.04 m (72 ft 3 1/2 in)		Slupianek #13		29 July 1979	Potsdam	
	23	21.99 m (72 ft 1 1/2 in)		Fibingerová #2		26 September 1976	Opava	
	24	21.98 m (72 ft 1 1/4 in)		Slupianek #14		17 July 1979	Berlin	
	25	21.96 m (72 ft 1/2 in)		Fibingerová #3		8 June 1977	Ostrava	
	25	21.96 m (72 ft 1/2 in)		Lisovskaya #8		16 August 1984	Prague	
	25	21.96 m (72 ft 1/2 in)		Lisovskaya #9		28 August 1988	Vilnius	
5		21.89 m (71 ft 9 3/4 in)	glide	Ivanka Khristova	Bulgaria	4 July 1976	Belmeken	
6		21.86 m (71 ft 8 1/2 in)	glide	Marianne Adam	East Germany	23 June 1979	Leipzig	
7		21.76 m (71 ft 4 1/2 in)	glide	Li Meisu	China	23 April 1988	Shijiazhuang	
8		21.73 m (71 ft 3 1/2 in)	glide	Natalya Akhrimenko	Soviet Union	21 May 1988	Leselidze	
9		21.69 m (71 ft 1 3/4 in)	glide	Vita Pavlysh	Ukraine	20 August 1998	Budapest	
10		21.66 m (71 ft 3/4 in)	glide	Sui Xinmei	China	9 June 1990	Beijing	
11		21.61 m (70 ft 10 3/4 in)	glide	Verzhinia Veselinova	Bulgaria	21 August 1982	Sofia	
12		21.58 m (70 ft 9 1/2 in)	glide	Margitta Droese-Pufe	East Germany	28 May 1978	Erfurt	
13		21.57 m (70 ft 9 in)	glide	Ines Müller	East Germany	16 May 1988	Athens	
14		21.53 m (70 ft 7 1/2 in)	glide	Nunu Abashidze	Soviet Union	20 June 1984	Kyiv	
15		21.52 m (70 ft 7 in)	glide	Huang Zhihong	China	27 June 1990	Beijing	
16		21.46 m (70 ft 4 3/4 in)	glide	Larisa Peleshenko	Russia	26 August 2000	Budapest	
17		21.45 m (70 ft 4 1/4 in)	glide	Nadezhda Chizhova	Soviet Union	29 September 1973	Varna	
18		21.43 m (70 ft 3 1/2 in)	glide	Eva Wilms	West Germany	17 June 1977	Munich	
19		21.42 m (70 ft 3 1/4 in)	glide	Svetlana Krachevskaya	Soviet Union	24 July 1980	Moscow	
20		21.31 m (69 ft 10 3/4 in)	glide	Heike Hartwig	East Germany	16 May 1988	Athens	
21		21.27 m (69 ft 9 1/4 in)	glide	Liane Schmuhl	East Germany	26 June 1982	Cottbus	
22		21.24 m (69 ft 8 in)	glide	Valerie Adams	New Zealand	29 August 2011	Daegu	
23		21.22 m (69 ft 7 1/4 in)	glide	Astrid Kumbernuss	Germany	5 August 1995	Gothenburg	
24		21.21 m (69 ft 7 in)	glide	Kathrin Neimke	East Germany	5 September 1987	Rome	
25		21.19 m (69 ft 6 1/4 in)	glide	Helma Knorscheidt	East Germany	24 May 1984	Berlin	

=== Men (indoor) ===
- Correct as of February 2026.

Rank	Mark	Athlete	Date	Place	Ref.
1	22.82 m (74 ft 10 1/4 in)	Ryan Crouser (USA)	24 January 2021	Fayetteville	
2	22.66 m (74 ft 4 in)	Randy Barnes (USA)	20 January 1989	Los Angeles	
3	22.55 m (73 ft 11 3/4 in)	Ulf Timmermann (GDR)	11 February 1989	Senftenberg	
4	22.53 m (73 ft 11 in)	Darlan Romani (BRA)	19 March 2022	Belgrade	
5	22.40 m (73 ft 5 3/4 in)	Adam Nelson (USA)	15 February 2008	Fayetteville	
6	22.37 m (73 ft 4 1/2 in)	Leonardo Fabbri (ITA)	11 February 2024	Liévin	
7	22.31 m (73 ft 2 1/4 in)	Tom Walsh (NZL)	3 March 2018	Birmingham	
8	22.26 m (73 ft 1/4 in)	Werner Günthör (SUI)	8 February 1987	Magglingen	
9	22.23 m (72 ft 11 in) A	Ryan Whiting (USA)	23 February 2014	Albuquerque	
10	22.18 m (72 ft 9 in)	Christian Cantwell (USA)	22 February 2008	Warrensburg	
11	22.17 m (72 ft 8 3/4 in)	Tomáš Staněk (CZE)	6 February 2018	Düsseldorf	
12	22.16 m (72 ft 8 1/4 in)	Rajindra Campbell (JAM)	23 February 2024	Madrid	
13	22.11 m (72 ft 6 1/4 in)	Reese Hoffa (USA)	10 March 2006	Moscow	
14	22.09 m (72 ft 5 1/2 in)	Mika Halvari (FIN)	7 February 2000	Tampere	
15	22.07 m (72 ft 4 3/4 in)	Roger Steen (USA)	11 February 2026	Belgrade	
16	22.06 m (72 ft 4 1/2 in)	Zane Weir (ITA)	3 March 2023	Istanbul	
17	22.05 m (72 ft 4 in)	Joe Kovacs (USA)	13 February 2021	Geneva	
18	22.04 m (72 ft 3 1/2 in)	Jordan Geist (USA)	3 February 2026	Ostrava	
18	22.04 m (72 ft 3 1/2 in)	Jordan Geist (USA)	6 February 2026	Madrid	
19	22.02 m (72 ft 2 3/4 in)	George Woods (USA)	8 February 1974	Inglewood	
20	22.00 m (72 ft 2 in)	Konrad Bukowiecki (POL)	15 February 2018	Toruń	
21	21.93 m (71 ft 11 1/4 in)	Bob Bertemes (LUX)	19 February 2023	Kirchberg	
22	21.88 m (71 ft 9 1/4 in)	David Storl (GER)	9 March 2012	Istanbul	
23	21.85 m (71 ft 8 in)	Turner Washington (USA)	13 February 2021	Lubbock	
24	21.84 m (71 ft 7 3/4 in)	Filip Mihaljević (CRO)	27 February 2020	Belgrade	
24	21.84 m (71 ft 7 3/4 in)	Roman Kokoshko (UKR)	3 March 2023	Istanbul	

==== Notes ====
Below is a list of all other throws equal or superior to 22.42 m:

- Ryan Crouser also threw 22.80 (2024), 22.77 (2024), 22.70 (2021), 22.66 (2021), 22.65 (2021), 22.60 (2020), 22.58 (2020, 2023), 22.48 (2021), 22.43 (2021) and 22.42 (2023).
- Randy Barnes also threw 22.66 (1989).
- Ulf Timmermann also threw 22.55 (1989).

Ryan Crouser threw 23.38 i, a possible world record, in Pocatello, Idaho on 18 February 2023. But this result was unratifiable because the throwing circle was too wide and raised above ground level.

=== Women (indoor) ===
- Correct as of March 2026.

Rank	Mark	Athlete	Date	Place	Ref.
1	22.50 m (73 ft 9 3/4 in)	Helena Fibingerová (TCH)	19 February 1977	Jablonec	
2	22.14 m (72 ft 7 1/2 in)	Natalya Lisovskaya (URS)	7 February 1987	Penza	
3	21.60 m (70 ft 10 1/4 in)	Valentina Fedyushina (UKR)	28 December 1991	Simferopol	
4	21.59 m (70 ft 10 in)	Ilona Slupianek (GDR)	24 January 1979	Berlin	
5	21.46 m (70 ft 4 3/4 in)	Claudia Losch (FRG)	4 February 1986	Zweibrücken	
6	21.26 m (69 ft 9 in)	Ines Müller (GDR)	24 February 1985	Berlin	
6	21.26 m (69 ft 9 in)	Natalya Akhrimenko (URS)	24 January 1987	Leningrad	
8	21.23 m (69 ft 7 3/4 in)	Margitta Droese-Pufe (GDR)	26 February 1978	Senftenberg	
9	21.15 m (69 ft 4 1/2 in)	Irina Korzhanenko (RUS)	18 February 1999	Moscow	
10	21.10 m (69 ft 2 1/2 in)	Sui Xinmei (CHN)	3 March 1990	Beijing	
11	21.08 m (69 ft 1 3/4 in)	Li Meisu (CHN)	25 March 1988	Beijing	
12	21.06 m (69 ft 1 in)	Eva Wilms (FRG)	19 February 1977	Dortmund	
12	21.06 m (69 ft 1 in)	Nunu Abashidze (URS)	8 February 1984	Budapest	
14	21.03 m (68 ft 11 3/4 in)	Helma Knorscheidt (GDR)	4 August 1983	Berlin	
15	20.98 m (68 ft 9 3/4 in)	Valerie Adams (NZL)	28 August 2013	Zürich	
16	20.94 m (68 ft 8 1/4 in)	Kathrin Neimke (GDR)	3 February 1988	Senftenberg	
17	20.85 m (68 ft 4 3/4 in)	Heidi Krieger (GDR)	25 January 1987	Berlin	
18	20.78 m (68 ft 2 in)	Ivanka Khristova (BUL)	14 February 1976	Sofia	
19	20.75 m (68 ft 3/4 in)	Heike Hartwig (GDR)	7 February 1987	Senftenberg	
20	20.74 m (68 ft 1/2 in)	Verzhiniya Veselinova (BUL)	21 February 1982	Sofia	
21	20.73 m (68 ft 0 in)	Vita Pavlysh (UKR)	22 February 2004	Sumy	
22	20.71 m (67 ft 11 1/4 in)	Larisa Peleshenko (URS)	11 February 1988	Volgograd	
23	20.70 m (67 ft 10 3/4 in)	Liane Schmuhl (GDR)	27 February 1982	Senftenberg	
24	20.69 m (67 ft 10 1/2 in)	Svetlana Krivelyova (RUS)	22 January 1999	Moscow	
24	20.69 m (67 ft 10 1/2 in)	Jessica Schilder (NED)	9 March 2025	Apeldoorn	
24	20.69 m (67 ft 10 1/2 in)	Jessica Schilder (NED)	6 March 2026	Berlin	

==== Annulled ====
The following athletes had their performance (inside 21.50 m) annulled due to doping offences:

- Nadzeya Ostapchuk 21.70 (2010)

== Olympic medalists ==
=== Men ===
Games	Gold	Silver	Bronze
1896 Athens	Robert Garrett; United States	Miltiadis Gouskos; Greece	Georgios Papasideris; Greece
1900 Paris	Richard Sheldon; United States	Josiah McCracken; United States	Robert Garrett; United States
1904 St. Louis	Ralph Rose; United States	Wesley Coe; United States	Lawrence Feuerbach; United States
1908 London	Ralph Rose; United States	Denis Horgan; Great Britain	John Garrels; United States
1912 Stockholm	Pat McDonald; United States	Ralph Rose; United States	Lawrence Whitney; United States
1920 Antwerp	Ville Pörhölä; Finland	Elmer Niklander; Finland	Harry Liversedge; United States
1924 Paris	Bud Houser; United States	Glenn Hartranft; United States	Ralph Hills; United States
1928 Amsterdam	John Kuck; United States	Herman Brix; United States	Emil Hirschfeld; Germany
1932 Los Angeles	Leo Sexton; United States	Harlow Rothert; United States	František Douda; Czechoslovakia
1936 Berlin	Hans Woellke; Germany	Sulo Bärlund; Finland	Gerhard Stöck; Germany
1948 London	Wilbur Thompson; United States	Jim Delaney; United States	Jim Fuchs; United States
1952 Helsinki	Parry O'Brien; United States	Darrow Hooper; United States	Jim Fuchs; United States
1956 Melbourne	Parry O'Brien; United States	Bill Nieder; United States	Jiří Skobla; Czechoslovakia
1960 Rome	Bill Nieder; United States	Parry O'Brien; United States	Dallas Long; United States
1964 Tokyo	Dallas Long; United States	Randy Matson; United States	Vilmos Varjú; Hungary
1968 Mexico City	Randy Matson; United States	George Woods; United States	Eduard Gushchin; Soviet Union
1972 Munich	Władysław Komar; Poland	George Woods; United States	Hartmut Briesenick; East Germany
1976 Montreal	Udo Beyer; East Germany	Yevgeniy Mironov; Soviet Union	Aleksandr Baryshnikov; Soviet Union
1980 Moscow	Vladimir Kiselyov; Soviet Union	Aleksandr Baryshnikov; Soviet Union	Udo Beyer; East Germany
1984 Los Angeles	Alessandro Andrei; Italy	Mike Carter; United States	Dave Laut; United States
1988 Seoul	Ulf Timmermann; East Germany	Randy Barnes; United States	Werner Günthör; Switzerland
1992 Barcelona	Mike Stulce; United States	Jim Doehring; United States	Vyacheslav Lykho; Unified Team
1996 Atlanta	Randy Barnes; United States	John Godina; United States	Oleksandr Bagach; Ukraine
2000 Sydney	Arsi Harju; Finland	Adam Nelson; United States	John Godina; United States
2004 Athens	Adam Nelson; United States	Joachim Olsen; Denmark	Manuel Martínez; Spain
2008 Beijing	Tomasz Majewski; Poland	Christian Cantwell; United States	Dylan Armstrong; Canada
2012 London	Tomasz Majewski; Poland	David Storl; Germany	Reese Hoffa; United States
2016 Rio de Janeiro	Ryan Crouser; United States	Joe Kovacs; United States	Tom Walsh; New Zealand
2020 Tokyo	Ryan Crouser; United States	Joe Kovacs; United States	Tom Walsh; New Zealand
2024 Paris	Ryan Crouser; United States	Joe Kovacs; United States	Rajindra Campbell; Jamaica
2028 Los Angeles			

=== Women ===
Games	Gold	Silver	Bronze
1948 London	Micheline Ostermeyer; France	Amelia Piccinini; Italy	Ina Schäffer; Austria
1952 Helsinki	Galina Zybina; Soviet Union	Marianne Werner; Germany	Klavdiya Tochonova; Soviet Union
1956 Melbourne	Tamara Tyshkevich; Soviet Union	Galina Zybina; Soviet Union	Marianne Werner; United Team of Germany
1960 Rome	Tamara Press; Soviet Union	Johanna Lüttge; United Team of Germany	Earlene Brown; United States
1964 Tokyo	Tamara Press; Soviet Union	Renate Culmberger; United Team of Germany	Galina Zybina; Soviet Union
1968 Mexico City	Margitta Gummel; East Germany	Marita Lange; East Germany	Nadezhda Chizhova; Soviet Union
1972 Munich	Nadezhda Chizhova; Soviet Union	Margitta Gummel; East Germany	Ivanka Khristova; Bulgaria
1976 Montreal	Ivanka Khristova; Bulgaria	Nadezhda Chizhova; Soviet Union	Helena Fibingerová; Czechoslovakia
1980 Moscow	Ilona Slupianek; East Germany	Svetlana Krachevskaya; Soviet Union	Margitta Pufe; East Germany
1984 Los Angeles	Claudia Losch; West Germany	Mihaela Loghin; Romania	Gael Martin; Australia
1988 Seoul	Natalya Lisovskaya; Soviet Union	Kathrin Neimke; East Germany	Li Meisu; China
1992 Barcelona	Svetlana Krivelyova; Unified Team	Huang Zhihong; China	Kathrin Neimke; Germany
1996 Atlanta	Astrid Kumbernuss; Germany	Sui Xinmei; China	Irina Khudoroshkina; Russia
2000 Sydney	Yanina Karolchik; Belarus	Larisa Peleshenko; Russia	Astrid Kumbernuss; Germany
2004 Athens	Yumileidi Cumbá; Cuba	Nadine Kleinert; Germany	Not awarded
2008 Beijing	Valerie Vili; New Zealand	Misleydis González; Cuba	Gong Lijiao; China
2012 London	Valerie Adams; New Zealand	Gong Lijiao; China	Li Ling; China
2016 Rio de Janeiro	Michelle Carter; United States	Valerie Adams; New Zealand	Anita Márton; Hungary
2020 Tokyo	Gong Lijiao; China	Raven Saunders; United States	Valerie Adams; New Zealand
2024 Paris	Yemisi Ogunleye; Germany	Maddi Wesche; New Zealand	Song Jiayuan; China
2028 Los Angeles			

== World Championship medalists ==
=== Men ===
Championships	Gold	Silver	Bronze
1983 Helsinki	Edward Sarul (POL)	Ulf Timmermann (GDR)	Remigius Machura (TCH)
1987 Rome	Werner Günthör (SUI)	Alessandro Andrei (ITA)	John Brenner (USA)
1991 Tokyo	Werner Günthör (SUI)	Lars Arvid Nilsen (NOR)	Aleksandr Klimenko (URS)
1993 Stuttgart	Werner Günthör (SUI)	Randy Barnes (USA)	Oleksandr Bagach (UKR)
1995 Gothenburg	John Godina (USA)	Mika Halvari (FIN)	Randy Barnes (USA)
1997 Athens	John Godina (USA)	Oliver-Sven Buder (GER)	C. J. Hunter (USA)
1999 Seville	C. J. Hunter (USA)	Oliver-Sven Buder (GER)	Oleksandr Bagach (UKR)
2001 Edmonton	John Godina (USA)	Adam Nelson (USA)	Arsi Harju (FIN)
2003 Saint-Denis	Andrei Mikhnevich (BLR)	Adam Nelson (USA)	Yuriy Bilonoh (UKR)
2005 Helsinki	Adam Nelson (USA)	Rutger Smith (NED)	Ralf Bartels (GER)
2007 Osaka	Reese Hoffa (USA)	Adam Nelson (USA)	Rutger Smith (NED)
2009 Berlin	Christian Cantwell (USA)	Tomasz Majewski (POL)	Ralf Bartels (GER)
2011 Daegu	David Storl (GER)	Dylan Armstrong (CAN)	Christian Cantwell (USA)
2013 Moscow	David Storl (GER)	Ryan Whiting (USA)	Dylan Armstrong (CAN)
2015 Beijing	Joe Kovacs (USA)	David Storl (GER)	O'Dayne Richards (JAM)
2017 London	Tom Walsh (NZL)	Joe Kovacs (USA)	Stipe Žunić (CRO)
2019 Doha	Joe Kovacs (USA)	Ryan Crouser (USA)	Tom Walsh (NZL)
2022 Eugene	Ryan Crouser (USA)	Joe Kovacs (USA)	Josh Awotunde (USA)
2023 Budapest	Ryan Crouser (USA)	Leonardo Fabbri (ITA)	Joe Kovacs (USA)
2025 Tokyo	Ryan Crouser (USA)	Uziel Muñoz (MEX)	Leonardo Fabbri (ITA)

=== Women ===
Championships	Gold	Silver	Bronze
1983 Helsinki	Helena Fibingerová (TCH)	Helma Knorscheidt (GDR)	Ilona Schoknecht-Slupianek (GDR)
1987 Rome	Natalya Lisovskaya (URS)	Kathrin Neimke (GDR)	Ines Müller (GDR)
1991 Tokyo	Huang Zhihong (CHN)	Natalya Lisovskaya (URS)	Svetlana Krivelyova (URS)
1993 Stuttgart	Huang Zhihong (CHN)	Svetlana Krivelyova (RUS)	Kathrin Neimke (GER)
1995 Gothenburg	Astrid Kumbernuss (GER)	Huang Zhihong (CHN)	Svetla Mitkova (BUL)
1997 Athens	Astrid Kumbernuss (GER)	Vita Pavlysh (UKR)	Stephanie Storp (GER)
1999 Seville	Astrid Kumbernuss (GER)	Nadine Kleinert (GER)	Svetlana Krivelyova (RUS)
2001 Edmonton	Yanina Karolchik (BLR)	Nadine Kleinert (GER)	Vita Pavlysh (UKR)
2003 Saint-Denis	Svetlana Krivelyova (RUS)	Nadzeya Ostapchuk (BLR)	Vita Pavlysh (UKR)
2005 Helsinki	Olga Ryabinkina (RUS)	Valerie Vili (NZL)	Nadine Kleinert (GER)
2007 Osaka	Valerie Vili (NZL)	Nadine Kleinert (GER)	Li Ling (CHN)
2009 Berlin	Valerie Vili (NZL)	Nadine Kleinert (GER)	Gong Lijiao (CHN)
2011 Daegu	Valerie Adams (NZL)	Jillian Camarena-Williams (USA)	Gong Lijiao (CHN)
2013 Moscow	Valerie Adams (NZL)	Christina Schwanitz (GER)	Gong Lijiao (CHN)
2015 Beijing	Christina Schwanitz (GER)	Gong Lijiao (CHN)	Michelle Carter (USA)
2017 London	Gong Lijiao (CHN)	Anita Márton (HUN)	Michelle Carter (USA)
2019 Doha	Gong Lijiao (CHN)	Danniel Thomas-Dodd (JAM)	Christina Schwanitz (GER)
2022 Eugene	Chase Ealey (USA)	Gong Lijiao (CHN)	Jessica Schilder (NED)
2023 Budapest	Chase Ealey (USA)	Sarah Mitton (CAN)	Gong Lijiao (CHN)
2025 Tokyo	Jessica Schilder (NED)	Chase Jackson (USA)	Maddison-Lee Wesche (NZL)

== World Indoor Championships medalists ==
=== Men ===
Games	Gold	Silver	Bronze
1985 Paris^{[A]}	Remigius Machura (TCH)	Udo Beyer (GDR)	Jānis Bojārs (URS)
1987 Indianapolis	Ulf Timmermann (GDR)	Werner Günthör (SUI)	Sergey Smirnov (URS)
1989 Budapest	Ulf Timmermann (GDR)	Randy Barnes (USA)	Georg Andersen (NOR)
1991 Seville	Werner Günthör (SUI)	Klaus Bodenmüller (AUT)	Ron Backes (USA)
1993 Toronto	Mike Stulce (USA)	Jim Doehring (USA)	Oleksandr Bagach (UKR)
1995 Barcelona	Mika Halvari (FIN)	C. J. Hunter (USA)	Dragan Perić (FRY)
1997 Paris	Yuriy Bilonoh (UKR)	Oleksandr Bagach (UKR)	John Godina (USA)
1999 Maebashi	Oleksandr Bagach (UKR)	John Godina (USA)	Yuriy Bilonoh (UKR)
2001 Lisbon	John Godina (USA)	Adam Nelson (USA)	Manuel Martínez (ESP)
2003 Birmingham	Manuel Martínez (ESP)	John Godina (USA)	Yuriy Bilonoh (UKR)
2004 Budapest	Christian Cantwell (USA)	Reese Hoffa (USA)	Joachim Olsen (DEN)
2006 Moscow	Reese Hoffa (USA)	Joachim Olsen (DEN)	Pavel Sofin (RUS)
2008 Valencia	Christian Cantwell (USA)	Reese Hoffa (USA)	Tomasz Majewski (POL)
2010 Doha	Christian Cantwell (USA)	Ralf Bartels (GER)	Dylan Armstrong (CAN)
2012 Istanbul	Ryan Whiting (USA)	David Storl (GER)	Tomasz Majewski (POL)
2014 Sopot	Ryan Whiting (USA)	David Storl (GER)	Tomas Walsh (NZL)
2016 Portland	Tomas Walsh (NZL)	Andrei Gag (ROU)	Filip Mihaljević (CRO)
2018 Birmingham	Tomas Walsh (NZL)	David Storl (GER)	Tomáš Staněk (CZE)
2022 Belgrade	Darlan Romani (BRA)	Ryan Crouser (USA)	Tomas Walsh (NZL)
2024 Glasgow	Ryan Crouser (USA)	Tomas Walsh (NZL)	Leonardo Fabbri (ITA)
2025 Nanjing	Tomas Walsh (NZL)	Roger Steen (USA)	Adrian Piperi (USA)
2026 Toruń	Tomas Walsh (NZL)	Jordan Geist (USA)	Roger Steen (USA)

=== Women ===
Games	Gold	Silver	Bronze
1985 Paris^{[A]}	Natalya Lisovskaya (URS)	Ines Müller (GDR)	Nunu Abashidze (URS)
1987 Indianapolis	Natalya Lisovskaya (URS)	Ilona Briesenick (GDR)	Claudia Losch (FRG)
1989 Budapest	Claudia Losch (FRG)	Huang Zhihong (CHN)	Christa Wiese (GDR)
1991 Seville	Sui Xinmei (CHN)	Huang Zhihong (CHN)	Natalya Lisovskaya (URS)
1993 Toronto	Svetlana Krivelyova (RUS)	Stephanie Storp (GER)	Zhang Liuhong (CHN)
1995 Barcelona	Kathrin Neimke (GER)	Connie Price-Smith (USA)	Grit Hammer (GER)
1997 Paris	Vita Pavlysh (UKR)	Astrid Kumbernuss (GER)	Irina Korzhanenko (RUS)
1999 Maebashi	Svetlana Krivelyova (RUS)	Krystyna Danilczyk-Zabawska (POL)	Teri Steer-Tunks (USA)
2001 Lisbon	Larisa Peleshenko (RUS)	Nadzeya Ostapchuk (BLR)	Svetlana Krivelyova (RUS)
2003 Birmingham	Irina Korzhanenko (RUS)	Nadzeya Ostapchuk (BLR)	Astrid Kumbernuss (GER)
2004 Budapest	Svetlana Krivelyova (RUS)	Yumileidi Cumbá (CUB)	Nadine Kleinert (GER)
2006 Moscow	Natallia Mikhnevich (BLR)	Nadine Kleinert (GER)	Olga Ryabinkina (RUS)
2008 Valencia	Valerie Vili (NZL)	Li Meiju (CHN)	Misleydis González (CUB)
2010 Doha	Valerie Adams (NZL)	Anna Avdeyeva (RUS)	Nadine Kleinert (GER)
2012 Istanbul	Valerie Adams (NZL)	Michelle Carter (USA)	Jillian Camarena-Williams (USA)
2014 Sopot	Valerie Adams (NZL)	Christina Schwanitz (GER)	Gong Lijiao (CHN)
2016 Portland	Michelle Carter (USA)	Anita Márton (HUN)	Valerie Adams (NZL)
2018 Birmingham	Anita Márton (HUN)	Danniel Thomas-Dodd (JAM)	Gong Lijiao (CHN)
2022 Belgrade	Auriol Dongmo (POR)	Chase Ealey (USA)	Jessica Schilder (NED)
2024 Glasgow	Sarah Mitton (CAN)	Yemisi Ogunleye (GER)	Chase Jackson (USA)
2025 Nanjing	Sarah Mitton (CAN)	Jessica Schilder (NED)	Chase Jackson (USA)
2026 Toruń	Chase Jackson (USA)	Sarah Mitton (CAN)	Axelina Johansson (SWE)

- ^{^{A}} Known as the World Indoor Games

== World leading marks ==
=== Men ===
Year	Mark	Athlete	Place
1964	20.68 m (67 ft 10 in)	Dallas Long (USA)	Los Angeles
1965	21.52 m (70 ft 7 in)	Randy Matson (USA)	College Station
1966	21.09 m (69 ft 2 1/4 in)	Randy Matson (USA)	Los Angeles
1967	21.78 m (71 ft 5 1/4 in)	Randy Matson (USA)	College Station
1968	21.30 m (69 ft 10 1/2 in)	Randy Matson (USA)	Walnut
1969	20.64 m (67 ft 8 1/2 in)	Neal Steinhauer (USA)	Eugene
1969	20.64 m (67 ft 8 1/2 in)	Hans-Peter Gies (GDR)	Budapest
1970	21.75 m (71 ft 4 1/4 in)	Randy Matson (USA)	Berkeley
1971	21.12 m (69 ft 3 1/4 in)	Heinz-Joachim Rothenburg (GDR)	Moscow
1972	21.54 m (70 ft 8 in)	Hartmut Briesenick (GDR)	Potsdam
1973	21.82 m (71 ft 7 in)	Al Feuerbach (USA)	San Jose
1974	22.02 m (72 ft 2 3/4 in) i	George Woods (USA)	Moscow
1975	22.86 m (75 ft 0 in) A	Brian Oldfield (USA)	El Paso
1976	22.45 m (73 ft 7 3/4 in) A	Brian Oldfield (USA)	El Paso
1977	21.74 m (71 ft 3 3/4 in)	Udo Beyer (GDR)	Düsseldorf
1978	22.15 m (72 ft 8 in)	Udo Beyer (GDR)	Gothenburg
1979	21.74 m (71 ft 3 3/4 in)	Udo Beyer (GDR)	Linz
1980	21.98 m (72 ft 1 1/4 in)	Udo Beyer (GDR)	Erfurt
1981	22.02 m (72 ft 2 3/4 in)	Brian Oldfield (USA)	Modesto
1982	22.02 m (72 ft 2 3/4 in)	Dave Laut (USA)	Koblenz
1983	22.22 m (72 ft 10 3/4 in)	Udo Beyer (GDR)	Los Angeles
1984	22.19 m (72 ft 9 1/2 in)	Brian Oldfield (USA)	San Jose
1985	22.62 m (74 ft 2 1/2 in)	Ulf Timmermann (GDR)	Berlin
1986	22.64 m (74 ft 3 1/4 in)	Udo Beyer (GDR)	Berlin
1987	22.91 m (75 ft 1 3/4 in)	Alessandro Andrei (ITA)	Viareggio
1988	23.06 m (75 ft 7 3/4 in)	Ulf Timmermann (GDR)	Hania
1989	22.66 m (74 ft 4 in) i	Randy Barnes (USA)	Los Angeles
1990	23.12 m (75 ft 10 in)	Randy Barnes (USA)	Westwood
1991	22.03 m (72 ft 3 1/4 in)	Werner Günthör (SUI)	Oslo
1992	21.98 m (72 ft 1 1/4 in)	Gregg Tafralis (USA)	Los Gatos
1993	21.98 m (72 ft 1 1/4 in)	Werner Günthör (SUI)	Linz
1994	21.09 m (69 ft 2 1/4 in)	Jim Doehring (USA)	New York City
1995	22.00 m (72 ft 2 in)	John Godina (USA)	Knoxville
1996	22.40 m (73 ft 5 3/4 in)	Randy Barnes (USA)	Rüdlingen
1997	22.03 m (72 ft 3 1/4 in)	Randy Barnes (USA)	Indianapolis
1998	21.78 m (71 ft 5 1/4 in)	John Godina (USA)	Walnut
1999	22.02 m (72 ft 2 3/4 in)	John Godina (USA)	Eugene
2000	22.12 m (72 ft 6 3/4 in)	Adam Nelson (USA)	Sacramento
2001	21.97 m (72 ft 3/4 in)	Janus Robberts (RSA)	Eugene
2002	22.51 m (73 ft 10 in)	Adam Nelson (USA)	Gresham
2003	22.67 m (74 ft 4 1/2 in)	Kevin Toth (USA)	Lawrence
2004	22.54 m (73 ft 11 1/4 in)	Christian Cantwell (USA)	Gresham
2005	22.20 m (72 ft 10 in)	John Godina (USA)	Carson
2006	22.45 m (73 ft 7 3/4 in)	Christian Cantwell (USA)	Gateshead
2007	22.43 m (73 ft 7 in)	Reese Hoffa (USA)	London
2008	22.40 m (73 ft 5 3/4 in) i	Adam Nelson (USA)	Fayetteville
2009	22.16 m (72 ft 8 1/4 in)	Christian Cantwell (USA)	Zagreb
2010	22.41 m (73 ft 6 1/4 in)	Christian Cantwell (USA)	Eugene
2011	22.21 m (72 ft 10 1/4 in) A	Dylan Armstrong (CAN)	Calgary
2012	22.31 m (73 ft 2 1/4 in)	Christian Cantwell (USA)	Champaign
2013	22.28 m (73 ft 1 in)	Ryan Whiting (USA)	Doha
2014	22.23 m (72 ft 11 in) i A	Ryan Whiting (USA)	Albuquerque
2015	22.56 m (74 ft 0 in)	Joe Kovacs (USA)	Monaco
2016	22.52 m (73 ft 10 1/2 in)	Ryan Crouser (USA)	Rio de Janeiro
2017	22.65 m (74 ft 3 1/2 in)	Ryan Crouser (USA)	Sacramento
2018	22.67 m (74 ft 4 1/2 in)	Tom Walsh (NZL)	Auckland
2019	22.91 m (75 ft 1 3/4 in)	Joe Kovacs (USA)	Doha
2020	22.91 m (75 ft 1 3/4 in)	Ryan Crouser (USA)	Marietta
2021	23.37 m (76 ft 8 in)	Ryan Crouser (USA)	Eugene
2022	23.23 m (76 ft 2 1/2 in)	Joe Kovacs (USA)	Zürich
2023	23.56 m (77 ft 3 1/2 in)	Ryan Crouser (USA)	Los Angeles
2024	23.13 m (75 ft 10 1/2 in)	Joe Kovacs (USA)	Eugene
2025	22.82 m (74 ft 10 1/4 in)	Leonardo Fabbri (ITA)	Caorle
2026	23.08 m (75 ft 8 1/2 in)	Rajindra Campbell (JAM)	Brussels

=== Women ===
Year	Mark	Athlete	Place
1964	18.40 m (60 ft 4 1/4 in)	Tamara Press (URS)	Minsk
1965	18.59 m (60 ft 11 3/4 in)	Tamara Press (URS)	Kassel
1966	18.01 m (59 ft 1 in)	Tamara Press (URS)	Auckland
1967	18.34 m (60 ft 2 in)	Nadezhda Chizhova (URS)	Karl-Marx-Stadt
1968	19.61 m (64 ft 4 in) A	Margitta Gummel (GDR)	Mexico City
1969	20.43 m (67 ft 1/4 in)	Nadezhda Chizhova (URS)	Athens
1970	19.69 m (64 ft 7 in)	Nadezhda Chizhova (URS)	Erfurt
1971	20.43 m (67 ft 1/4 in)	Nadezhda Chizhova (URS)	Moscow
1972	21.03 m (68 ft 11 3/4 in)	Nadezhda Chizhova (URS)	Munich
1973	21.45 m (70 ft 4 1/4 in)	Nadezhda Chizhova (URS)	Varna
1974	21.57 m (70 ft 9 in)	Helena Fibingerová (TCH)	Gottwaldov
1975	21.60 m (70 ft 10 1/4 in)	Marianne Adam (GDR)	Berlin
1976	21.99 m (72 ft 1 1/2 in)	Helena Fibingerová (TCH)	Opava
1977	22.50 m (73 ft 9 3/4 in) i	Helena Fibingerová (TCH)	Jablonec
1978	22.06 m (72 ft 4 1/2 in)	Ilona Slupianek (GDR)	Berlin
1979	22.04 m (72 ft 3 1/2 in)	Ilona Slupianek (GDR)	Potsdam
1980	22.45 m (73 ft 7 3/4 in)	Ilona Slupianek (GDR)	Potsdam
1981	21.61 m (70 ft 10 3/4 in)	Ilona Slupianek (GDR)	Potsdam
1982	21.80 m (71 ft 6 1/4 in)	Ilona Slupianek (GDR)	Potsdam
1983	22.40 m (73 ft 5 3/4 in)	Ilona Slupianek (GDR)	Berlin
1984	22.53 m (73 ft 11 in)	Natalya Lisovskaya (URS)	Sochi
1985	21.73 m (71 ft 3 1/2 in)	Natalya Lisovskaya (URS)	Erfurt
1986	21.70 m (71 ft 2 1/4 in)	Natalya Lisovskaya (URS)	Tallinn
1987	22.63 m (74 ft 2 3/4 in)	Natalya Lisovskaya (URS)	Moscow
1988	22.55 m (73 ft 11 3/4 in)	Natalya Lisovskaya (URS)	Tallinn
1989	20.82 m (68 ft 3 1/2 in)	Li Meisu (CHN)	Prague
1990	21.66 m (71 ft 3/4 in)	Sui Xinmei (CHN)	Beijing
1991	21.60 m (70 ft 10 1/4 in) i	Valentina Fedyushina (URS)	Simferopol
1992	21.06 m (69 ft 1 in)	Svetlana Krivelyova (RUS)	Barcelona
1993	20.84 m (68 ft 4 1/4 in)	Svetlana Krivelyova (RUS)	Moscow
1994	20.54 m (67 ft 4 1/2 in)	Sui Xinmei (CHN)	Beijing
1995	21.22 m (69 ft 7 1/4 in)	Astrid Kumbernuss (GER)	Gothenburg
1996	20.97 m (68 ft 9 1/2 in)	Astrid Kumbernuss (GER)	Duisburg
1997	21.22 m (69 ft 7 1/4 in)	Astrid Kumbernuss (GER)	Hamburg
1998	21.69 m (71 ft 1 3/4 in)	Viktoriya Pavlysh (UKR)	Budapest
1999	21.15 m (69 ft 4 1/2 in) i	Irina Korzhanenko (RUS)	Moscow
2000	21.46 m (70 ft 4 3/4 in)	Larisa Peleshenko (RUS)	Moscow
2001	20.79 m (68 ft 2 1/2 in)	Larisa Peleshenko (RUS)	Tula
2002	20.64 m (67 ft 8 1/2 in)	Irina Korzhanenko (RUS)	Munich
2003	20.77 m (68 ft 1 1/2 in)	Svetlana Krivelyova (RUS)	Tula
2004	20.79 m (68 ft 2 1/2 in)	Irina Korzhanenko (RUS)	Tula
2005	21.09 m (69 ft 2 1/4 in)	Nadzeya Astapchuk (BLR)	Minsk
2006	20.20 m (66 ft 3 1/4 in)	Valerie Vili (NZL)	Christchurch
2007	20.54 m (67 ft 4 1/2 in)	Valerie Vili (NZL)	Osaka
2008	20.70 m (67 ft 10 3/4 in)	Natalya Mikhnevich (BLR)	Grodno
2009	21.07 m (69 ft 1 1/2 in)	Valerie Vili (NZL)	Thessaloniki
2010	20.86 m (68 ft 5 1/4 in)	Valerie Adams (NZL)	Split
2011	21.24 m (69 ft 8 in)	Valerie Adams (NZL)	Daegu
2012	21.11 m (69 ft 3 in)	Valerie Adams (NZL)	Lucerne
2013	20.98 m (68 ft 9 3/4 in) i	Valerie Adams (NZL)	Zürich
2014	20.67 m (67 ft 9 3/4 in) i	Valerie Adams (NZL)	Sopot
2015	20.77 m (68 ft 1 1/2 in)	Christina Schwanitz (GER)	Beijing
2016	20.63 m (67 ft 8 in)	Michelle Carter (USA)	Rio de Janeiro
2017	20.11 m (65 ft 11 1/2 in)	Gong Lijiao (CHN)	Böhmenkirch
2018	20.38 m (66 ft 10 1/4 in) A	Gong Lijiao (CHN)	Guiyang
2019	20.31 m (66 ft 7 1/2 in)	Gong Lijiao (CHN)	Zürich
2020	19.70 m (64 ft 7 1/2 in) i	Gong Lijiao (CHN)	Beijing
2021	20.58 m (67 ft 6 in)	Gong Lijiao (CHN)	Tokyo
2022	20.51 m (67 ft 3 1/4 in)	Chase Ealey (USA)	Eugene
2023	20.76 m (68 ft 1 1/4 in)	Chase Ealey (USA)	Eugene
2024	20.68 m (67 ft 10 in)	Sarah Mitton (CAN)	Fleetwood
2025	20.95 m (68 ft 8 3/4 in)	Chase Jackson (USA)	Rathdrum
2026	21.14 m (69 ft 4 1/4 in)	Chase Jackson (USA)	Brussels

== See also ==
- 20 meter club
- Masters shot put world record progression
- Pundo
- Stone put
