= 1972 European Athletics Indoor Championships – Women's shot put =

The women's shot put event at the 1972 European Athletics Indoor Championships was held on 11 March in Grenoble.

== Results ==
Rank	Name	Nationality	#1	#2	#3	#4	#5	#6	Result	Notes
1st place, gold medalist(s)	Nadezhda Chizhova	Soviet Union	19.41	x	19.17	18.54	18.90	18.90	19.41	
2nd place, silver medalist(s)	Antonina Ivanova	Soviet Union	17.32	18.54	x	17.88	17.64	18.05	18.54	
3rd place, bronze medalist(s)	Marianne Adam	East Germany	18.30	17.95	17.81	17.75	x	17.87	18.30	
4	Ivanka Khristova	Bulgaria	17.44	17.46	17.35	17.31	17.92	17.37	17.92	
5	Ludwika Chewińska	Poland	16.40	17.11	17.88	17.50	x	17.66	17.88	
6	Galina Nekrasova	Soviet Union	17.10	17.60	17.68	17.07	17.35	17.23	17.68	
7	Radostina Vasekova	Bulgaria	17.60	17.26	17.11	16.92	16.84	17.23	17.60	
8	Helena Fibingerová	Czechoslovakia	17.01	17.13	17.16	x	17.40	x	17.40	
9	Valentina Cioltan	Romania	16.20	17.09	16.74				17.09	
10	Sigrun Kofink	West Germany	15.54	16.18	15.67				16.18	
11	Ana Salagean	Romania	15.65	15.47	16.04				16.04	
12	Elena Stoyanova	Bulgaria	15.63	x	15.59				15.63	
13	Mary Peters	Great Britain	x	13.77	14.90				14.90	
