= 1971 European Athletics Indoor Championships – Women's shot put =

The women's shot put event at the 1971 European Athletics Indoor Championships was held on 13 March in Sofia.

== Results ==
Rank	Name	Nationality	#1	#2	#3	#4	#5	#6	Result	Notes
1st place, gold medalist(s)	Nadezhda Chizhova	Soviet Union	19.70	x	x	18.48	x	18.57	19.70	CR
2nd place, silver medalist(s)	Margitta Gummel	East Germany	19.14	19.50	19.45	x	x	19.13	19.50	
3rd place, bronze medalist(s)	Antonina Ivanova	Soviet Union	18.21	18.69	x	x	18.20	x	18.69	
4	Marianne Adam	East Germany	17.49	17.48	17.26	16.54	17.10	17.40	17.49	
5	Ivanka Khristova	Bulgaria	17.42	17.42	x	x	17.11	17.20	17.42	
6	Ana Salagean	Romania	15.63	15.51	16.43	16.27	16.13	x	16.43	
7	Els van Noorduyn	Netherlands							16.22	
8	Sigrun Kofink	West Germany							16.20	
9	Ludwika Chewińska	Poland							15.85	
10	Eva Veres	Hungary							14.98	
11	Radostina Vasekova	Bulgaria							14.70	
