= 1970 European Athletics Indoor Championships – Women's shot put =

The women's shot put event at the 1970 European Athletics Indoor Championships was held on 15 March in Vienna.

== Results ==
Rank	Name	Nationality	Result	Notes
1st place, gold medalist(s)	Nadezhda Chizhova	Soviet Union	18.80	WB
2nd place, silver medalist(s)	Hannelore Friedel	East Germany	18.39	
3rd place, bronze medalist(s)	Marita Lange	East Germany	18.09	
4	Irina Solontsova	Soviet Union	17.99	
5	Ivanka Khristova	Bulgaria	17.58	
6	Antonina Ivanova	Soviet Union	17.54	
7	Marlene Fuchs	West Germany	16.71	
8	Mary Peters	Great Britain	15.70	
9	Helena Fibingerová	Czechoslovakia	14.59	
