= Shot put at the Olympics =

Shot put at the Olympic Games
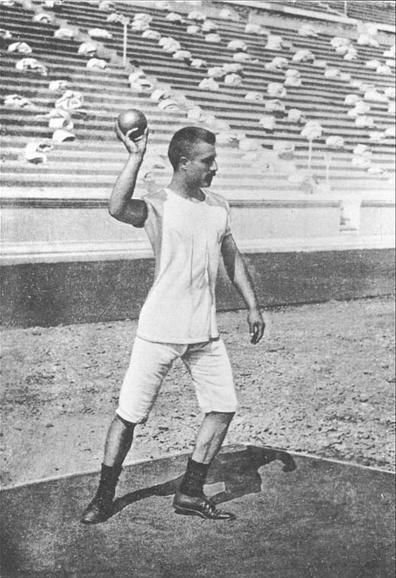
- The inaugural shot put in 1896

Overview
- Sport: Athletics
- Gender: Men and women
- Years held: Men: 1896–2024; Women: 1948–2024

Olympic record
- Men: 23.30 m Ryan Crouser (2021)
- Women: 22.41 m Ilona Slupianek (1980)

Reigning champion
- Men: Ryan Crouser (USA)
- Women: Yemisi Ogunleye (GER)

The shot put at the Summer Olympics is one of four track and field throwing events held at the multi-sport event. The men's shot put has been present on the Olympic athletics programme since 1896 (one of two throws events at the first Olympics, alongside the discus). The women's event was added to the programme at the 1948 Olympics just over fifty years later.

The Olympic record for the women's event was set by the East German Ilona Slupianek with a put of 22.41 m (73 ft 6 1/4 in) in 1980, and the record for the men's event of 23.30 m (76 ft 5 1/4 in) was set by the American Ryan Crouser in 2021.

Two variations on the event have been contested at the Olympics: a two-handed competition at the 1912 Stockholm Olympics, with athletes using both left and right arm putting techniques, and a stone throw at the 1906 Intercalated Games.

== Medalists ==
=== Men ===
Games	Gold	Silver	Bronze
1896 Athens	Robert Garrett; United States	Miltiadis Gouskos; Greece	Georgios Papasideris; Greece
1900 Paris	Richard Sheldon; United States	Josiah McCracken; United States	Robert Garrett; United States
1904 St. Louis	Ralph Rose; United States	Wesley Coe; United States	Lawrence Feuerbach; United States
1908 London	Ralph Rose; United States	Denis Horgan; Great Britain	John Garrels; United States
1912 Stockholm	Pat McDonald; United States	Ralph Rose; United States	Lawrence Whitney; United States
1920 Antwerp	Ville Pörhölä; Finland	Elmer Niklander; Finland	Harry Liversedge; United States
1924 Paris	Bud Houser; United States	Glenn Hartranft; United States	Ralph Hills; United States
1928 Amsterdam	John Kuck; United States	Herman Brix; United States	Emil Hirschfeld; Germany
1932 Los Angeles	Leo Sexton; United States	Harlow Rothert; United States	František Douda; Czechoslovakia
1936 Berlin	Hans Woellke; Germany	Sulo Bärlund; Finland	Gerhard Stöck; Germany
1948 London	Wilbur Thompson; United States	Jim Delaney; United States	Jim Fuchs; United States
1952 Helsinki	Parry O'Brien; United States	Darrow Hooper; United States	Jim Fuchs; United States
1956 Melbourne	Parry O'Brien; United States	Bill Nieder; United States	Jiří Skobla; Czechoslovakia
1960 Rome	Bill Nieder; United States	Parry O'Brien; United States	Dallas Long; United States
1964 Tokyo	Dallas Long; United States	Randy Matson; United States	Vilmos Varjú; Hungary
1968 Mexico City	Randy Matson; United States	George Woods; United States	Eduard Gushchin; Soviet Union
1972 Munich	Władysław Komar; Poland	George Woods; United States	Hartmut Briesenick; East Germany
1976 Montreal	Udo Beyer; East Germany	Yevgeniy Mironov; Soviet Union	Aleksandr Baryshnikov; Soviet Union
1980 Moscow	Vladimir Kiselyov; Soviet Union	Aleksandr Baryshnikov; Soviet Union	Udo Beyer; East Germany
1984 Los Angeles	Alessandro Andrei; Italy	Mike Carter; United States	Dave Laut; United States
1988 Seoul	Ulf Timmermann; East Germany	Randy Barnes; United States	Werner Günthör; Switzerland
1992 Barcelona	Mike Stulce; United States	Jim Doehring; United States	Vyacheslav Lykho; Unified Team
1996 Atlanta	Randy Barnes; United States	John Godina; United States	Oleksandr Bagach; Ukraine
2000 Sydney	Arsi Harju; Finland	Adam Nelson; United States	John Godina; United States
2004 Athens	Adam Nelson; United States	Joachim Olsen; Denmark	Manuel Martínez; Spain
2008 Beijing	Tomasz Majewski; Poland	Christian Cantwell; United States	Dylan Armstrong; Canada
2012 London	Tomasz Majewski; Poland	David Storl; Germany	Reese Hoffa; United States
2016 Rio de Janeiro	Ryan Crouser; United States	Joe Kovacs; United States	Tom Walsh; New Zealand
2020 Tokyo	Ryan Crouser; United States	Joe Kovacs; United States	Tom Walsh; New Zealand
2024 Paris	Ryan Crouser; United States	Joe Kovacs; United States	Rajindra Campbell; Jamaica

==== Multiple medalists ====
Rank	Athlete	Nation	Olympics	Gold	Silver	Bronze	Total
1	Ryan Crouser	United States	2016–2024	3	0	0	3
2	Ralph Rose	United States	1904–1912	2	1	0	3
2	Parry O'Brien	United States	1952–1960	2	1	0	3
4	Tomasz Majewski	Poland	2008–2012	2	0	0	2
4	Joe Kovacs	United States	2016–2024	0	3	0	3
6	Bill Nieder	United States	1956–1960	1	1	0	2
6	Randy Matson	United States	1964–1968	1	1	0	2
6	Randy Barnes	United States	1988–1996	1	1	0	2
6	Adam Nelson	United States	2000–2004	1	1	0	2
10	Robert Garrett	United States	1896–1900	1	0	1	2
10	Dallas Long	United States	1960–1964	1	0	1	2
10	Udo Beyer	East Germany	1976–1980	1	0	1	2
13	George Woods	United States	1968–1972	0	2	0	2
15	Aleksandr Baryshnikov	Soviet Union	1976–1980	0	1	1	2
15	John Godina	United States	1996–2000	0	1	1	2
17	Tom Walsh	New Zealand	2016–2020	0	0	2	2
17	Jim Fuchs	United States	1948–1952	0	0	2	2

==== Medalists by country ====
Rank	Nation	Gold	Silver	Bronze	Total
1	United States	20	22	12	54
2	Poland	3	0	0	3
3	Finland	2	2	0	4
4	East Germany	2	0	2	4
5	Soviet Union	1	2	2	5
6	Germany	1	1	2	4
7	Italy	1	0	0	1
8	Greece	0	1	1	2
9=	Denmark	0	1	0	1
9=	Great Britain	0	1	0	1
11=	Czechoslovakia	0	0	2	2
11=	New Zealand	0	0	2	2
12=	Belarus	0	0	1	1
12=	Hungary	0	0	1	1
12=	Jamaica	0	0	1	1
12=	Spain	0	0	1	1
12=	Switzerland	0	0	1	1
12=	Ukraine	0	0	1	1
12=	Unified Team	0	0	1	1

=== Women ===
Games	Gold	Silver	Bronze
1948 London	Micheline Ostermeyer; France	Amelia Piccinini; Italy	Ina Schäffer; Austria
1952 Helsinki	Galina Zybina; Soviet Union	Marianne Werner; Germany	Klavdiya Tochonova; Soviet Union
1956 Melbourne	Tamara Tyshkevich; Soviet Union	Galina Zybina; Soviet Union	Marianne Werner; United Team of Germany
1960 Rome	Tamara Press; Soviet Union	Johanna Lüttge; United Team of Germany	Earlene Brown; United States
1964 Tokyo	Tamara Press; Soviet Union	Renate Culmberger; United Team of Germany	Galina Zybina; Soviet Union
1968 Mexico City	Margitta Gummel; East Germany	Marita Lange; East Germany	Nadezhda Chizhova; Soviet Union
1972 Munich	Nadezhda Chizhova; Soviet Union	Margitta Gummel; East Germany	Ivanka Khristova; Bulgaria
1976 Montreal	Ivanka Khristova; Bulgaria	Nadezhda Chizhova; Soviet Union	Helena Fibingerová; Czechoslovakia
1980 Moscow	Ilona Slupianek; East Germany	Svetlana Krachevskaya; Soviet Union	Margitta Pufe; East Germany
1984 Los Angeles	Claudia Losch; West Germany	Mihaela Loghin; Romania	Gael Martin; Australia
1988 Seoul	Natalya Lisovskaya; Soviet Union	Kathrin Neimke; East Germany	Li Meisu; China
1992 Barcelona	Svetlana Krivelyova; Unified Team	Huang Zhihong; China	Kathrin Neimke; Germany
1996 Atlanta	Astrid Kumbernuss; Germany	Sui Xinmei; China	Irina Khudoroshkina; Russia
2000 Sydney	Yanina Karolchik; Belarus	Larisa Peleshenko; Russia	Astrid Kumbernuss; Germany
2004 Athens	Yumileidi Cumbá; Cuba	Nadine Kleinert; Germany	Not awarded
2008 Beijing	Valerie Vili; New Zealand	Misleydis González; Cuba	Gong Lijiao; China
2012 London	Valerie Adams; New Zealand	Gong Lijiao; China	Li Ling; China
2016 Rio de Janeiro	Michelle Carter; United States	Valerie Adams; New Zealand	Anita Márton; Hungary
2020 Tokyo	Gong Lijiao; China	Raven Saunders; United States	Valerie Adams; New Zealand
2024 Paris	Yemisi Ogunleye; Germany	Maddi Wesche; New Zealand	Song Jiayuan; China

==== Multiple medalists ====
Rank	Athlete	Nation	Olympics	Gold	Silver	Bronze	Total
1	Valerie Adams	New Zealand	2008–2020	2	1	1	4
2	Tamara Press	Soviet Union	1960–1964	2	0	0	2
3=	Galina Zybina	Soviet Union	1952–1964	1	1	1	3
3=	Nadezhda Chizhova	Soviet Union	1968–1976	1	1	1	3
5	Margitta Gummel	East Germany	1968–1972	1	1	0	2
6=	Ivanka Khristova	Bulgaria	1972–1976	1	0	1	2
6=	Astrid Kumbernuss	Germany	1996–2000	1	0	1	2
8=	Marianne Werner	Germany	1952–1956	0	1	1	2
8=	Kathrin Neimke	East Germany; Germany	1988–1992	0	1	1	2

==== Medalists by country ====
Rank	Nation	Gold	Silver	Bronze	Total
1	Soviet Union	6	3	3	12
2	East Germany	2	2	1	6
3	New Zealand	2	2	1	4
4	Belarus	1	1	1	3
5=	Bulgaria	1	0	1	2
5=	United States	1	1	1	3
7=	Cuba	1	0	0	1
7=	France	1	0	0	1
7=	Unified Team	1	0	0	1
7=	West Germany	1	0	0	1
11	Germany^{[nb]}	0	4	3	7
12	China	1	2	2	4
13	Russia	0	2	1	3
14=	Italy	0	1	0	1
14=	Romania	0	1	0	1
16=	Australia	0	0	1	1
16=	Austria	0	0	1	1
16=	Czechoslovakia	0	0	1	1

- ^{nb} The German total includes teams both competing as Germany and the United Team of Germany, but not East or West Germany.

== Intercalated Games ==
The 1906 Intercalated Games were held in Athens and at the time were officially recognised as part of the Olympic Games series, with the intention being to hold a games in Greece in two-year intervals between the internationally held Olympics. However, this plan never came to fruition and the International Olympic Committee (IOC) later decided not to recognise these games as part of the official Olympic series. Some sports historians continue to treat the results of these games as part of the Olympic canon.

At this event a men's shot put was held and Martin Sheridan of the United States won the competition. Hungary's Mihály Dávid was the runner-up while Swedish thrower Eric Lemming was the bronze medalist.

Games	Gold	Silver	Bronze
1906 Athens	Martin Sheridan (USA)	Mihály Dávid (HUN)	Eric Lemming (SWE)

A stone throw event, similar to the shot put, was also contested for the first and only time at an Olympic event. Athletes were allowed to throw rather than put the implement, which weighed 14 pounds (6.35 kg). Nikolaos Georgantas won the event for the host nation, while Sheridan (filling in for his absent teammate, Jim Mitchel) placed second. Another Greek, Mikhail Dorizas, came third.

Games	Gold	Silver	Bronze
1906 Athens	Nikolaos Georgantas (GRE)	Martin Sheridan (USA)	Mikhail Dorizas (GRE)

== Two-handed shot put ==
At the 1912 Stockholm Olympics a two-handed variant of the standard shot put competition took place. Each athlete had three attempts at the shot using each hand and their score was calculated by adding their best performances for the left and right hands. It featured two rounds, with the top three after the first round receiving a further three attempts with each arm.

Ralph Rose, a two-time Olympic champion in the standard shot put, topped the competition. Pat McDonald, who defeated Rose in the 1912 regular shot put final, took the silver medal. Elmer Niklander of Finland came third and went on to place in the top four of all the Olympic shot put and discus events that year.

Games	Gold	Silver	Bronze
1912 Athens	Ralph Rose (USA)	Pat McDonald (USA)	Elmer Niklander (FIN)
