= 1969 European Athletics Championships – Women's shot put =

Women's shot put at the European Athletics Championships

The women's shot put at the 1969 European Athletics Championships was held in Athens, Greece, at Georgios Karaiskakis Stadium on 16 September 1969.

== Medalists ==
Gold	Nadezhda Chizhova; Soviet Union
Silver	Margitta Gummel; East Germany
Bronze	Marita Lange; East Germany

== Results ==
=== Final ===
16 September

Rank	Name	Nationality	Result	Notes
1st place, gold medalist(s)	Nadezhda Chizhova	Soviet Union	20.43	WR
2nd place, silver medalist(s)	Margitta Gummel	East Germany	19.58	
3rd place, bronze medalist(s)	Marita Lange	East Germany	18.56	
4	Ivanka Khristova	Bulgaria	18.04	NR
5	Renate Boy	East Germany	17.59	
6	Els van Noorduyn	Netherlands	17.28	NR
7	Irina Solontsova	Soviet Union	17.25	
8	Galina Nekrasova	Soviet Union	17.19	
9	Vladimíra Srbová	Czechoslovakia	15.52	
10	Helena Fibingerová	Czechoslovakia	15.22	
11	Brenda Bedford	Great Britain	14.14	

== Participation ==
According to an unofficial count, 11 athletes from 6 countries participated in the event.

- Bulgaria (1)
- Czechoslovakia (2)
- East Germany (3)
- Netherlands (1)
- Soviet Union (3)
- Great Britain (1)
