= 1974 European Athletics Championships – Women's shot put =

Women's shot put at the European Athletics Championships

The women's shot put at the 1974 European Athletics Championships was held in Rome, Italy, at Stadio Olimpico on 2 September 1974.

== Medalists ==
Gold	Nadezhda Chizhova; Soviet Union
Silver	Marianne Adam; East Germany
Bronze	Helena Fibingerová; Czechoslovakia

== Results ==
=== Final ===
2 September

Rank	Name	Nationality	Result	Notes
1st place, gold medalist(s)	Nadezhda Chizhova	Soviet Union	20.78	CR
2nd place, silver medalist(s)	Marianne Adam	East Germany	20.43	
3rd place, bronze medalist(s)	Helena Fibingerová	Czechoslovakia	20.33	
4	Ivanka Khristova	Bulgaria	19.17	
5	Ludwika Chewińska	Poland	18.98	
6	Marita Lange	East Germany	18.60	
7	Elena Stoyanova	Bulgaria	18.48	
8	Svetlana Krachevskaya	Soviet Union	18.27	
9	Yelena Korableva	Soviet Union	18.17	
10	Radostina Bakhchevanova	Bulgaria	17.97	
11	Cinzia Petrucci	Italy	14.97	

== Participation ==
According to an unofficial count, 11 athletes from 6 countries participated in the event.

- Bulgaria (3)
- Czechoslovakia (1)
- East Germany (2)
- Italy (1)
- Poland (1)
- Soviet Union (3)
