= 1968 European Indoor Games – Women's shot put =

1968 European Indoor Games event

The women's shot put event at the 1968 European Indoor Games was held on 10 March in Madrid.

== Results ==
Rank	Name	Nationality	#1	#2	#3	#4	#5	#6	Result	Notes
1st place, gold medalist(s)	Nadezhda Chizhova	Soviet Union	18.18	17.76	17.97	17.71	17.66	17.54	18.18	
2nd place, silver medalist(s)	Margitta Gummel	East Germany	17.33	16.98	17.40	17.62	17.04	17.46	17.62	
3rd place, bronze medalist(s)	Marita Lange	East Germany	16.86	17.19	x	16.94	16.87	16.88	17.19	
4	Ivanka Khristova	Bulgaria	16.41	16.96	16.68	17.11	x	15.96	17.11	
5	Marlene Fuchs	West Germany	x	15.63	16.01	15.49	x	15.59	16.01	
6	Maria Chorbova	Bulgaria	15.17	15.38	15.15	15.73	15.26	x	15.73	
7	Brenda Bedford	Great Britain							13.99	
