= 1971 European Athletics Championships – Women's shot put =

Women's shot put at the European Athletics Championships

The women's shot put at the 1971 European Athletics Championships was held in Helsinki, Finland, at Helsinki Olympic Stadium on 10 August 1971.

== Medalists ==
Gold	Nadezhda Chizhova; Soviet Union
Silver	Marita Lange; East Germany
Bronze	Margitta Gummel; East Germany

== Results ==
=== Final ===
10 August

Rank	Name	Nationality	Result	Notes
1st place, gold medalist(s)	Nadezhda Chizhova	Soviet Union	20.16	
2nd place, silver medalist(s)	Marita Lange	East Germany	19.25	
3rd place, bronze medalist(s)	Margitta Gummel	East Germany	19.22	
4	Antonina Ivanova	Soviet Union	18.80	
5	Hannelore Friedel	East Germany	18.52	
6	Ivanka Khristova	Bulgaria	17.78	
7	Galina Nekrasova	Soviet Union	17.56	
8	Judit Bognár	Hungary	17.33	
9	Els van Noorduyn	Netherlands	16.68	
10	Ludwika Chewińska	Poland	16.64	
11	Sigrun Kofink	West Germany	16.27	
12	Helena Fibingerová	Czechoslovakia	15.73	
13	Brigitte Berendonk	West Germany	15.39	
14	Christine Barck	Finland	14.42	

== Participation ==
According to an unofficial count, 14 athletes from 9 countries participated in the event.

- Bulgaria (1)
- Czechoslovakia (1)
- East Germany (3)
- Finland (1)
- Hungary (1)
- Netherlands (1)
- Poland (1)
- Soviet Union (3)
- West Germany (2)
