= Rosario Martínez (athlete) =

Salvadoran shot putter

Personal information
- Full name: Rosario Martínez Blandin
- Nationality: Salvadoran
- Born: 8 April 1948 (age 78)

Sport
- Sport: Athletics
- Event: Shot put

Rosario Martínez Blandin (born 8 April 1948) is a Salvadoran thrower. For the 1968 Summer Olympics, she competed for El Salvador in the women's shot put event. There, she placed 14th, El Salvador's best position at an athletics competition at any edition of the Olympic Games.

== Biography ==
Rosario Martínez Blandin was born on 8 April 1948 in La Unión, El Salvador. As an athlete, she represented El Salvador in international competition.

Martínez was selected to compete for El Salvador at the 1968 Summer Olympics in Mexico City, Mexico, for the nation's first appearance at an Olympic Games at a sporting capacity. At the 1968 Summer Games, she was entered to compete in the women's shot put event held in the Estadio Olímpico Universitario. As there was no qualifying round, the finals of the event were held on 20 October 1968 and had a total of 14 different athletes competing. Martínez, for her first attempt, recorded a distance of 9.58 metres (31.4 ft) and initially placed last. For her second attempt, she failed to record a distance and was then placed last. For her third attempt, she recorded a distance of 10.18 metres and placed last, failing to advance further as she was not one of the top eight athletes. The top eight athletes who qualified for the second stage of the event were Judit Bognár, Nadezhda Chizhova, Marlene Fuchs, Renate Garisch-Culmberger, Margitta Gummel, Ivanka Khristova, Marita Lange, and Els van Noorduyn. Although Martínez failed to reach the top eight, she set a new personal best in the event. As of the 2024 Summer Olympics, Martínez's placement in 14th place remains as El Salvador's best position at an athletics competition at any edition of the Olympic Games.
