= Athletics at the 1972 Summer Olympics – Women's shot put =

Women's shot put at the Games of the XX Olympiad
- Venue: Olympic Stadium
- Dates: September 4 & 7, 1972
- Competitors: 18 from 11 nations
- Winning distance: 21.03 WR

Medalists
1st place, gold medalist(s)		Nadezhda Chizhova; Soviet Union
2nd place, silver medalist(s)		Margitta Gummel; East Germany
3rd place, bronze medalist(s)		Ivanka Khristova; Bulgaria

The women's shot put field event at the 1972 Olympic Games took place on September 4 & 7. Nadezhda Chizhova was very disappointed with her bronze medal finish in 1968 Olympics. She has won the (1966, 1969 and the 1971) European Athletics Championships. Since 1968 she has broken the world record six times. The only threat for the gold medal came from Margitta Gummel the defending Olympic Champion.

== Records ==
Standing records prior to the 1972 Summer Olympics
World record	Nadezhda Chizhova (URS)	21.68 m	May 19, 1972	Moscow, Soviet Union
Olympic record	Margitta Gummel (GDR)	19.68 m	October 20, 1968	Mexico City, Mexico
Broken records during the 1972 Summer Olympics
Olympic record	Nadezhda Chizhova (URS)	21.03 m	September 7, 1972	Munich, West Germany

== Results ==
All throwers reaching 16.20 m (53 ft 2 in) and the top 12 including ties, advanced to the finals. All qualifiers are listen in blue. All distances are listed in metres.

=== Qualifying ===
Rank	Name	Nationality	Mark	#1	#2	#3
1	Ivanka Khristova	Bulgaria	19.20	19.20	p	p
2	Marianne Adam	East Germany	19.11	19.11	p	p
3	Margitta Gummel	East Germany	18.82	18.82	p	p
4	Helena Fibingerová	Czechoslovakia	18.66	18.66	p	p
5	Nadezhda Chizhova	Soviet Union	18.54	18.54	p	p
6	Marita Lange	East Germany	18.16	18.16	p	p
7	Antonina Ivanova	Soviet Union	17.87	17.87	p	p
8	Radostina Vasekova	Bulgaria	17.78	17.78	p	p
9	Elena Stoyanova	Bulgaria	17.70	17.70	p	p
10	Ludwika Chewińska	Poland	17.40	17.40	p	p
11	Esfir Dolzhenko	Soviet Union	17.18	17.18	p	p
12	Valentina Cioltan	Romania	16.85	16.85	p	p
13	Judit Bognár	Hungary	16.52	16.52	p	p
14	Maren Seidler	United States	16.18	15.63	16.05	16.18
15	Baeg Ok-Ja	South Korea	15.78	x	15.78	x
16	Jan Svendsen	United States	14.96	14.48	x	14.96
17	Rosa Molina	Chile	14.61	14.59	14.61	14.41
18	Nnenna Njoku	Nigeria	10.63	10.63	10.40	9.06

=== Final ===
Rank	Name	Nationality	Mark	#1	#2	#3	#4	#5	#6
1st place, gold medalist(s)	Nadezhda Chizhova	Soviet Union	21.03 WR	21.03	20.36	20.58	19.97	x	x
2nd place, silver medalist(s)	Margitta Gummel	East Germany	20.22	18.46	18.83	19.55	20.22	19.53	x
3rd place, bronze medalist(s)	Ivanka Khristova	Bulgaria	19.35	19.35	x	19.22	x	18.82	18.95
4	Esfir Dolzhenko	Soviet Union	19.24	18.43	19.24	x	18.74	x	x
5	Marianne Adam	East Germany	18.94	18.75	x	18.58	18.94	18.91	18.71
6	Marita Lange	East Germany	18.85	x	18.46	18.29	18.85	18.38	18.71
7	Helena Fibingerová	Czechoslovakia	18.81	18.62	x	x	18.59	18.81	x
8	Elena Stoyanova	Bulgaria	18.34	18.24	17.75	18.34	x	17.55	x
9	Antonina Ivanova	Soviet Union	18.28	18.28	17.99	17.98			
10	Ludwika Chewińska	Poland	18.24	17.71	18.24	17.73			
11	Judit Bognár	Hungary	18.23	17.93	17.97	18.23			
12	Radostina Vasekova	Bulgaria	17.86	17.86	17.48	17.52			
13	Valentina Cioltan	Romania	16.62	16.37	16.62	x			

Key: WR = world record; p = pass; x = fault
