= 1967 European Indoor Games – Women's shot put =

The women's shot put event at the 1967 European Indoor Games was held on 12 March in Prague.

== Results ==
Rank	Name	Nationality	#1	#2	#3	#4	#5	#6	Result	Notes
1st place, gold medalist(s)	Nadezhda Chizhova	Soviet Union	17.44	17.26	16.89	16.89	16.85	x	17.44	
2nd place, silver medalist(s)	Ivanka Khristova	Bulgaria	16.28	16.05	15.31	14.91	16.55	15.80	16.55	
3rd place, bronze medalist(s)	Maria Chorbova	Bulgaria	16.00	15.45	15.72	16.23	15.83	x	16.23	
4	Galina Zybina	Soviet Union	15.37	15.80	16.13	15.28	16.11	15.96	16.13	
5	Els van Noorduyn	Netherlands	13.83	13.93	14.48	15.02	15.28	x	15.28	
6	Ludmila Duchoňová	Czechoslovakia	14.52	14.73	14.99	15.06	x	14.73	15.06	
7	Milada Hebrová	Czechoslovakia	13.09	13.12	13.11				13.12	
