= Athletics at the 1968 Summer Olympics – Women's shot put =

Women's shot put at the Games of the XIX Olympiad
- Venue: Estadio Olímpico Universitario
- Date: October 20, 1968
- Competitors: 14 from 9 nations
- Winning distance: 19.61 WR

Medalists
1st place, gold medalist(s)		Margitta Gummel; East Germany
2nd place, silver medalist(s)		Marita Lange; East Germany
3rd place, bronze medalist(s)		Nadezhda Chizhova; Soviet Union

The women's shot put competition at the 1968 Summer Olympics in Mexico City, Mexico took place on October 20.

== Competition format ==
The competition consisted of a single round. Each competitor was allowed three throws, with the top eight athletes after that point being given three further attempts.

== Records ==
Prior to the competition, the existing World and Olympic records were as follows.

World record	Margitta Gummel (GDR)	18.87 m	Frankfurt (Oder), East Germany	April 23, 1967
Olympic record	Tamara Press (URS)	18.14 m	Tokyo, Japan	October 20, 1964

== Results ==
Rank	Name	Nationality	#1	#2	#3	#4	#5	#6	Result	Notes
1st place, gold medalist(s)	Margitta Gummel	East Germany	18.53	17.88	19.07	18.30	19.61	18.59	19.61	WR
2nd place, silver medalist(s)	Marita Lange	East Germany	18.78	X	18.17	18.47	18.20	18.26	18.78	
3rd place, bronze medalist(s)	Nadezhda Chizhova	Soviet Union	18.19	X	18.03	17.62	17.49	17.26	18.19	
4	Judit Bognár	Hungary	17.14	17.30	17.21	17.78	17.75	16.83	17.78	
5	Renate Garisch-Culmberger	East Germany	17.67	17.15	17.68	17.49	17.72	17.69	17.72	
6	Ivanka Khristova	Bulgaria	16.65	17.25	16.85	X	X	17.20	17.25	
7	Marlene Fuchs	West Germany	17.11	16.56	X	X	X	16.19	17.11	
8	Els van Noorduyn	Netherlands	15.89	15.71	14.97	15.54	16.23	16.10	16.23	
9	Irina Solontsova-Kudryavtseva	Soviet Union	X	15.88	15.76	—N/a			15.88	
10	Gertrud Schäfer	West Germany	14.70	15.26	15.10	—N/a			15.26	
11	Maren Seidler	United States	14.38	14.86	X	—N/a			14.86	
12	Rosa Molina	Chile	12.85	11.89	11.94	—N/a			12.85	
13	Baeg Ok-Ja	South Korea	12.67	12.08	11.97	—N/a			12.67	
14	Rosario Martínez	El Salvador	9.58	X	10.18	—N/a			10.18	
	Mary Peters	Great Britain				—N/a			DNS	
	Josephine de la Viña	Philippines				—N/a			DNS	
