= 1974 European Athletics Indoor Championships – Women's shot put =

The women's shot put event at the 1974 European Athletics Indoor Championships was held on 9 March in Gothenburg.

== Results ==
Rank	Name	Nationality	#1	#2	#3	#4	#5	#6	Result	Notes
1st place, gold medalist(s)	Helena Fibingerová	Czechoslovakia							20.75	WB
2nd place, silver medalist(s)	Nadezhda Chizhova	Soviet Union							20.62	NR
3rd place, bronze medalist(s)	Marianne Adam	East Germany	19.35	18.68	19.04	18.66	19.70	19.37	19.70	NR
4	Ivanka Khristova	Bulgaria							19.23	
5	Faina Melnik	Soviet Union							18.61	
6	Elena Stoyanova	Bulgaria							18.04	
7	Svetlana Krachevskaya	Soviet Union							18.02	
8	Judit Bognár	Hungary							17.82	
9	Eva Wilms	West Germany							16.61	
10	Cinzia Petrucci	Italy							15.43	
