= 1966 European Indoor Games – Women's shot put =

The women's shot put event at the 1966 European Indoor Games was held on 27 March in Dortmund.

== Medalists ==
Gold	Silver	Bronze
Margitta Gummel; East Germany	Tamara Press; Soviet Union	Nadezhda Chizhova; Soviet Union

== Results ==
=== Qualification ===
Rank	Name	Nationality	#1	#2	#3	Result	Notes
1	Irina Press	Soviet Union	17.03	–	–	17.03	q
2	Tamara Press	Soviet Union	16.85	16.35	15.94	16.85	q
3	Margitta Gummel	East Germany	16.80	–	–	16.80	q
4	Nadezhda Chizhova	Soviet Union	14.94	16.62	x	16.62	q
5	Judit Bognár	Hungary	14.64	15.50	–	15.50	q
6	Marlene Klein	West Germany	14.97	15.53	14.75	15.33	q
7	Mary Peters	Great Britain	13.98	13.45	14.56	14.56	
8	Loesje Boling	Netherlands	13.17	13.76	13.71	13.76	

=== Final ===
Rank	Name	Nationality	#1	#2	#3	#4	#5	#6	Result	Notes
1st place, gold medalist(s)	Margitta Gummel	East Germany	16.66	17.16	16.92	x	x	17.30	17.30	
2nd place, silver medalist(s)	Tamara Press	Soviet Union	16.12	16.57	17.00	x	x	15.95	17.00	
3rd place, bronze medalist(s)	Nadezhda Chizhova	Soviet Union	16.86	16.95	16.48	x	16.46	16.82	16.95	
4	Irina Press	Soviet Union	16.15	x	x	16.06	15.52	16.38	16.38	
5	Judit Bognár	Hungary	15.61	15.90	15.56	15.43	15.81	15.46	15.90	
6	Marlene Klein	West Germany	15.48	15.63	x	x	x	x	15.63	
