= 1973 European Athletics Indoor Championships – Women's shot put =

The women's shot put event at the 1973 European Athletics Indoor Championships was held on 10 March in Rotterdam.

== Results ==
Rank	Name	Nationality	Result	Notes
1st place, gold medalist(s)	Helena Fibingerová	Czechoslovakia	19.08	
2nd place, silver medalist(s)	Ludwika Chewińska	Poland	18.29	
3rd place, bronze medalist(s)	Antonina Ivanova	Soviet Union	18.25	
4	Ivanka Khristova	Bulgaria	17.92	
5	Elena Stoyanova	Bulgaria	17.77	
6	Radostina Vasekova	Bulgaria	17.28	
7	Raisa Taranda	Soviet Union	16.75	
8	Adilia Borges	Portugal	14.74	
