= Athletics at the 1976 Summer Olympics – Women's shot put =

Women's shot put at the Games of the XXI Olympiad
- Venue: Olympic Stadium
- Date: 31 July 1976
- Competitors: 13 from 8 nations
- Winning distance: 21.16 OR

Medalists
1st place, gold medalist(s)		Ivanka Khristova; Bulgaria
2nd place, silver medalist(s)		Nadezhda Chizhova; Soviet Union
3rd place, bronze medalist(s)		Helena Fibingerová; Czechoslovakia

The women's shot put event at the 1976 Summer Olympics in Montreal, Quebec, Canada had an entry list of 13 competitors. The final was held on 31 July 1976. There was no qualification round.

== Medalists ==
Gold	Ivanka Khristova; Bulgaria
Silver	Nadezhda Chizhova; Soviet Union
Bronze	Helena Fibingerová; Czechoslovakia

== Abbreviations ==
- All results shown are in metres

Q	automatic qualification
q	qualification by rank
DNS	did not start
NM	no mark
OR	olympic record
WR	world record
AR	area record
NR	national record
PB	personal best
SB	season best

== Records ==
Standing records prior to the 1976 Summer Olympics
World Record	Ivanka Khristova (BUL)	21.89 m	July 4, 1976	Belmeken, Bulgaria
Olympic Record	Nadezhda Chizhova (URS)	21.03 m	September 7, 1972	Munich, West Germany
Broken records during the 1976 Summer Olympics
Olympic Record	Ivanka Khristova (BUL)	21.16 m	July 31, 1976	Montreal, Quebec, Canada

== Final ==
Rank	Athlete	Attempts						Distance	Note
Rank	Athlete	1	2	3	4	5	6	Distance	Note
1st place, gold medalist(s)	Ivanka Khristova (BUL)	19.96	20.88	20.67	20.47	21.16	20.19	21.16 m	OR
2nd place, silver medalist(s)	Nadezhda Chizhova (URS)	20.84	20.96	X	X	14.16	X	20.96 m	
3rd place, bronze medalist(s)	Helena Fibingerová (TCH)	X	19.68	20.15	X	20.67	X	20.67 m	
4	Marianne Adam (GDR)	20.55	X	X	X	18.15	19.50	20.55 m	
5	Ilona Slupianek (GDR)	20.52	19.78	19.65	19.80	19.72	20.54	20.54 m	
6	Margitta Droese (GDR)	X	17.53	19.15	X	19.64	19.79	19.79 m	
7	Eva Wilms (FRG)	X	19.11	19.29	19.29	X	X	19.29 m	
8	Elena Stoyanova (BUL)	18.89	18.50	18.85	X	X	18.61	18.89 m	
9	Svetlana Krachevskaya (URS)	X	18.11	18.36				18.36 m	
10	Faina Melnik (URS)	17.46	17.77	18.07				18.07 m	
11	María Elena Sarría (CUB)	X	16.31	X				16.31 m	
12	Maren Seidler (USA)	14.63	15.60	X				15.60 m	
13	Lucette Moreau (CAN)	14.79	14.87	15.48				15.48 m	

== See also ==
- 1974 Women's European Championships shot put (Rome)
- 1978 Women's European Championships shot put (Prague)
