= Masters W35 shot put world record progression =

Masters W35 shot put world record progression is the progression of world record improvements of the shot put W35 division of Masters athletics. Records must be set in properly conducted, official competitions under the standing IAAF rules unless modified by World Masters Athletics. The W35 division consists of female athletes who have reached the age of 35 but have not yet reached the age of 40, so exactly from their 35th birthday to the day before their 40th birthday. The W35 division throws exactly the same 4 kg implement as the Women's Open division. These competitors all threw their records in open competition. Krachevskaya's records were set in the run-up to the Olympics, culminating in the silver medal at the 1980 Olympics. Peleshenko set her record a month before winning the silver medal at the 2000 Olympics. Olympians all, Ivanova is the only one on this list not to win an Olympic medal.

Key

Incomplete information Pending Indoor mark before 2000, not acceptable for record

Distance	Athlete	Nationality	Birthdate	Location	Date
21.47 i	Helena Fibingerová	Czech Republic	13.07.1949	Jablonec	09.02.1985
21.46	Larisa Peleshenko	Russia	29.02.1964	Moscow	26.08.2000
21.42	Svetlana Krachevskaya	Soviet Union	23.11.1944	Moscow	24.07.1980
21.23	Svetlana Krachevskaya	Soviet Union	23.11.1944	Moscow	04.07.1980
21.04	Svetlana Krachevskaya	Soviet Union	23.11.1944	Moscow	21.06.1980
20.80	Svetlana Krachevskaya	Soviet Union	23.11.1944	Moscow	12.06.1980
20.73	Svetlana Krachevskaya	Soviet Union	23.11.1944	Moscow	17.05.1980
19.39	Antonina Ivanova	Soviet Union	25.12.1932	Moscow	17.07.1971
17.01	Galina Zybina	Soviet Union	22.01.1931	Moscow	31.07.1967
