= 1975 European Athletics Indoor Championships – Women's shot put =

The women's shot put event at the 1975 European Athletics Indoor Championships was held on 8 March in Katowice.

== Results ==
Rank	Name	Nationality	#1	#2	#3	#4	#5	#6	Result	Notes
1st place, gold medalist(s)	Marianne Adam	East Germany	18.86	20.05	19.30	19.19	19.55	19.94	20.05	
2nd place, silver medalist(s)	Helena Fibingerová	Czechoslovakia							19.97	
3rd place, bronze medalist(s)	Ivanka Khristova	Bulgaria							19.35	
4	Svetlana Krachevskaya	Soviet Union							19.04	
5	Brunhilde Loewe	East Germany							18.47	
6	Elena Stoyanova	Bulgaria							18.34	
7	Tamara Bufetova	Soviet Union							17.75	
8	Margit Irányi	Hungary							16.23	
