= Rosario Martínez =

Rosario Martínez may refer to:

- Rosario Martínez (athlete) (born 1948), Salvadoran athlete
- Rosario Martínez (football manager), Uruguayan football manager
