= 1966 European Athletics Championships – Women's shot put =

Women's shot put at the European Athletics Championships

The women's shot put at the 1966 European Athletics Championships was held in Budapest, Hungary, at Népstadion on 30 August 1966.

== Medalists ==
| Gold | Nadezhda Chizhova; Soviet Union |
| Silver | Margitta Gummel; East Germany |
| Bronze | Marita Lange; East Germany |

== Results ==
=== Final ===
30 August

| Rank | Name | Nationality | Result | Notes |
|---|---|---|---|---|
| 1st place, gold medalist(s) | Nadezhda Chizhova | Soviet Union | 17.22 | |
| 2nd place, silver medalist(s) | Margitta Gummel | East Germany | 17.05 | |
| 3rd place, bronze medalist(s) | Marita Lange | East Germany | 16.96 | |
| 4 | Galina Zybina | Soviet Union | 16.65 | |
| 5 | Maria Chorbova | Bulgaria | 15.97 | |
| 6 | Gertrud Schäfer | West Germany | 15.95 | |
| 7 | Marlene Fuchs | West Germany | 15.89 | |
| 8 | Ana Sălăgean | Romania | 15.48 | |
| 9 | Judit Bognár | Hungary | 15.17 | |
| 10 | Ludmila Duchoňová | Czechoslovakia | 14.93 | |
| 11 | Mary Peters | Great Britain | 14.81 | |
| 12 | Lidia Sharamovich | Bulgaria | 14.61 | |
| 13 | Judit Mikuss | Hungary | 14.35 | |
| 14 | Pina Thani | Albania | 12.63 | |

== Participation ==
According to an unofficial count, 14 athletes from 9 countries participated in the event.

- Albania (1)
- Bulgaria (2)
- Czechoslovakia (1)
- East Germany (2)
- Hungary (2)
- Romania (1)
- Soviet Union (2)
- Great Britain (1)
- West Germany (2)
