= Ilja Keizer =

Dutch middle-distance runner

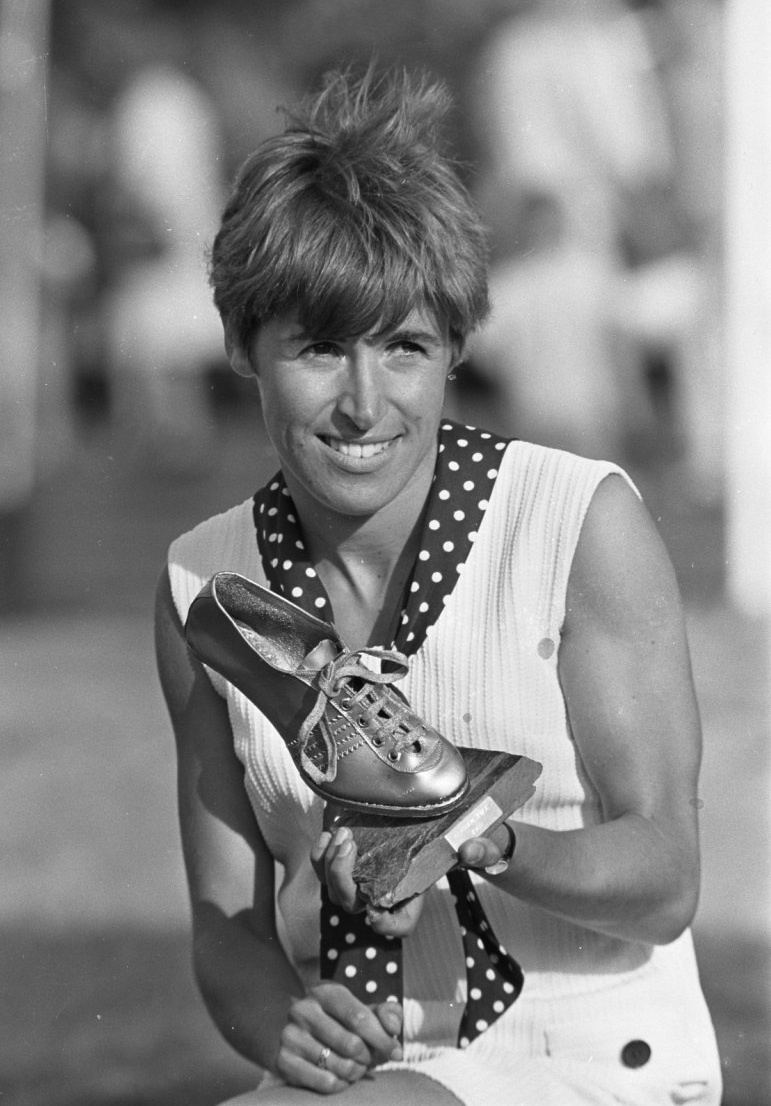
- Ilja Keizer in 1968

Personal information
- Nationality: Dutch
- Born: 26 February 1944 (age 82) IJmuiden, Netherlands
- Height: 1.65 m (5 ft 5 in)
- Weight: 51 kg (112 lb)

Sport
- Sport: Athletics
- Event: Sprint
- Club: De Spartaan, Lisse

Ilja Keizer (née Laman; born 26 February 1944) is a retired middle-distance runner from the Netherlands who competed at two Olympic Games.

== Biography ==
Laman finished second behind Anne Smith in the 880 yards event at the 1966 WAAA Championships.

Under her married name of Keizer, she competed at the 1968 and 1972 Summer Olympics in the 800 m and 1500 m, respectively, and finished in sixth place in 1972.

In 1970 and 1972, Keizer was selected as the Dutch female athlete of the year. Her personal bests were 2:02.2 in the 800 m (1968) and 4:05.13 in the 1500 m (1972).

Awards
Preceded by Tilly van der Made	KNAU Cup; 1965; 1970; 1972	Succeeded by Corrie Bakker
Preceded by Wilma van den Berg	KNAU Cup; 1965; 1970; 1972	Succeeded by Els van Noorduyn
Preceded by Els van Noorduyn	KNAU Cup; 1965; 1970; 1972	Succeeded by Mieke van Wissen-Sterk
