= Víceměřice =

- Municipality
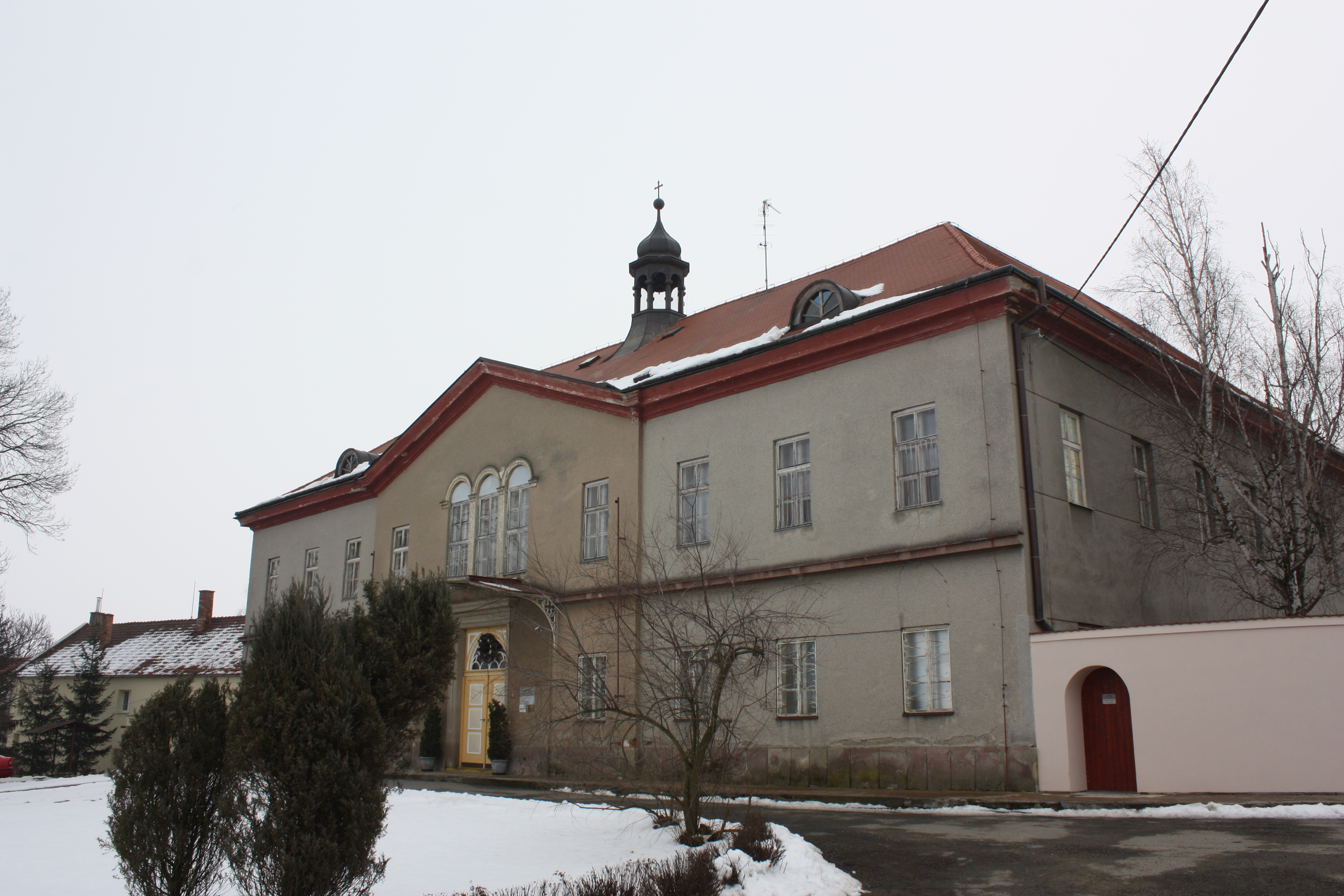
- Víceměřice Castle

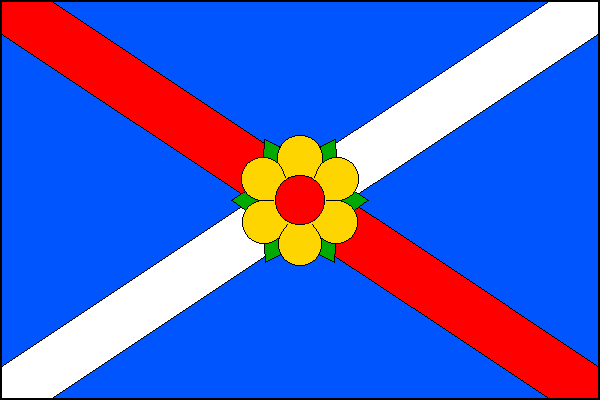
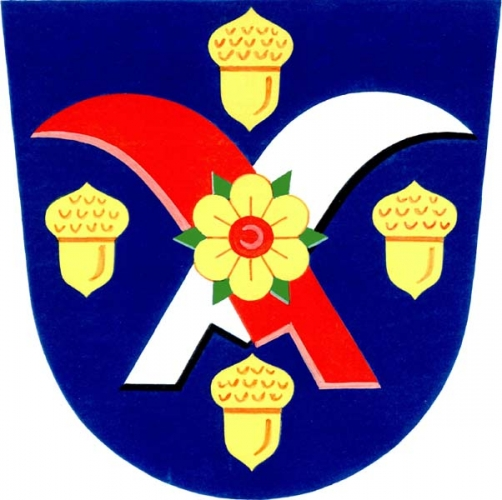
- Flag Coat of arms

- Location in the Czech Republic
- Coordinates: 49°20′39″N 17°10′19″E
- Country: Czech Republic
- Region: Olomouc
- District: Prostějov
- First mentioned: 1317

Area
  - Total: 3.36 km^{2} (1.30 sq mi)
- Elevation: 208 m (682 ft)

Population (2026-01-01)
  - Total: 561
  - Density: 167/km^{2} (432/sq mi)
- Time zone: UTC+1 (CET)
  - Summer (DST): UTC+2 (CEST)
- Postal code: 798 26
- Website: www.vicemerice.cz

Víceměřice is a municipality and village in Prostějov District in the Olomouc Region of the Czech Republic. It has about 600 inhabitants.

Víceměřice lies approximately 15 kilometres (9 mi) south of Prostějov, 28 km (17 mi) south of Olomouc, and 215 km (134 mi) south-east of Prague.

== Demographics ==
Historical population
Year	Pop.	±%
1869	422	—
1880	413	−2.1%
1890	457	+10.7%
1900	476	+4.2%
1910	454	−4.6%
1921	504	+11.0%
1930	586	+16.3%
1950	735	+25.4%
1961	715	−2.7%
1970	691	−3.4%
1980	640	−7.4%
1991	591	−7.7%
2001	536	−9.3%
2011	604	+12.7%
2021	608	+0.7%
Source: Censuses

== Notable people ==
- Helena Fibingerová (born 1949), shot putter, Olympic medalist
