= Masters W40 shot put world record progression =

Masters W40 shot put world record progression is the progression of world record improvements of the shot put W40 division of Masters athletics. Records must be set in properly conducted, official competitions under the standing IAAF rules unless modified by World Masters Athletics. The W40 division consists of female athletes who have reached the age of 40 but have not yet reached the age of 45, so exactly from their 40th birthday to the day before their 45th birthday. The W40 division throws a 4 kg implement, the same weight as the Open division.

Key

Incomplete information Pending Indoor mark before 2000, not acceptable for record

Distance	Athlete	Nationality	Birthdate	Age	Location	Date	Ref
19.16 m i	Antonina Ivanova	Soviet Union	25 December 1932	41 years, 61 days	Moscow	24 February 1974	
19.05 m	Antonina Ivanova	Soviet Union	25 December 1932	40 years, 241 days	Oryol	23 August 1973	
14.87 m	Anna Andreyeva	Soviet Union	23 June 1915	41 years, 8 days	Moscow	1 July 1956	
