= Valentina Cioltan =

Romanian athlete

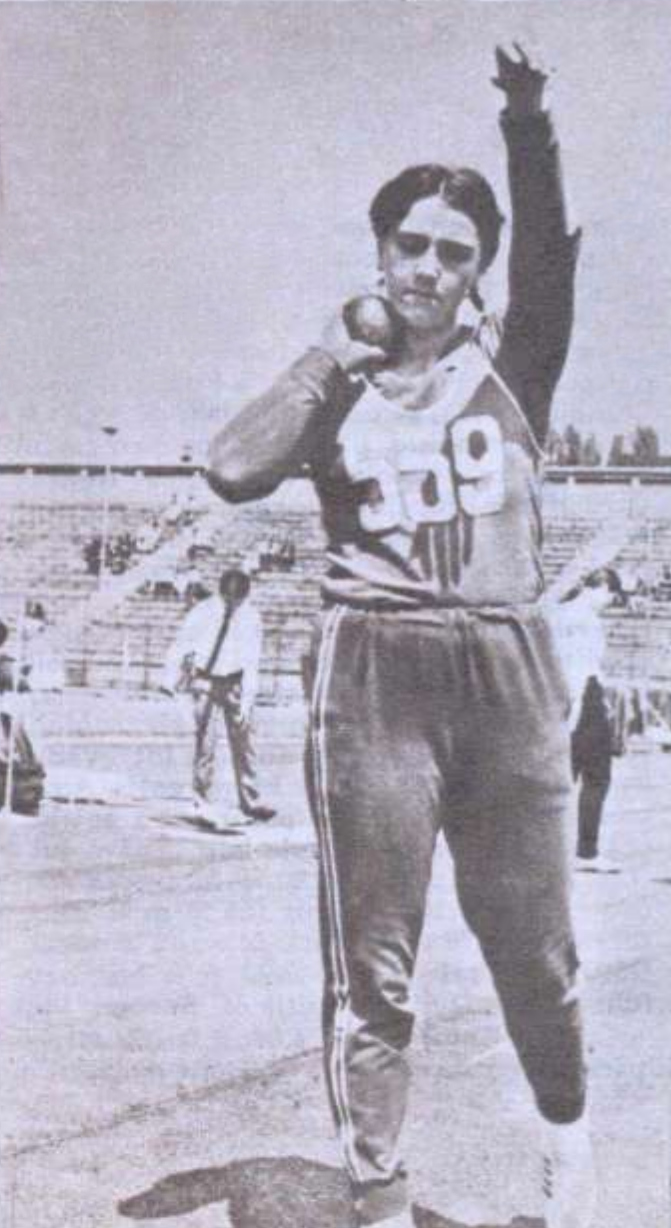
- Cioltan in 1972

Personal information
- Nationality: Romanian
- Born: 4 January 1952 (age 74)

Sport
- Sport: Athletics
- Event: Shot put

Valentina Cioltan (born 4 January 1952) is a Romanian athlete. She competed in the women's shot put at the 1972 Summer Olympics.
