= Antonina Ivanova =

Soviet shot putter

Medal record

Women's athletics

Representing Soviet Union

European Indoor Championships
Silver medal – second place	1972 Grenoble	Shot put
Bronze medal – third place	1971 Sofia	Shot put
Bronze medal – third place	1973 Rotterdam	Shot put

Antonina Grigoryevna Ivanova Vaschenko (Russian: Антонина Григорьевна Иванова; 25 December 1932 in Taganrog – 23 March 2006 in Moscow) was a Soviet shot putter. She participated in the 1972 Summer Olympics, placing seventh in the qualifying round, with a throw of 17.87 meters, then ninth in the final round, with a long throw of 18.28 meters. She participated in the annual European Athletics Indoor Championships from 1970 until 1973, placing 6th, 3rd, 2nd and 3rd, successively. She placed fourth at the 1971 European Athletics Championships.

She held the Masters shot put world record for women aged 35-39 from 1971 until 1980. She has held the Masters shot put world record for women aged 40-44 since 1973.
