= Women's shot put world record progression =

Sports records

The first world record in the women's shot put was recognised by the Fédération Sportive Féminine Internationale (FSFI) in 1924. The FSFI was absorbed by the International Association of Athletics Federations in 1936. These women's distances were achieved with a 4 kilograms (8.8 lb) shot put.

As of June 21, 2009, the IAAF (and the FSFI before it) have ratified 50 world records in the event. As of 2025, the official world record, set by Natalya Lisovskaya on 7 June 1987, stands at 22.63 m.

14 of the top 15 throwers of all time have set their personal best between 1976 and 1990. Since then, athletes have been subject to more rigorous drug testing, and marks like these are effectively unreachable today. The best throws by any women since Lisovskaya's record have been Larisa Peleshenko's 21.46 m, set in 2000, followed by Valerie Adams's 21.24 m from 2011.

== World record progression ==
Ratified
Not ratified
Ratified but later rescinded

=== Indoor ===
Only Fibingerova's 22.50 m in 1987 was ratified by the IAAF.

Women's shot put indoor world record progression
Mark	Athlete	Date	Location
12.02 m (39 ft 5 in)	Genowefa Cejzik (POL)	9 March 1937	Warsaw
12.56 m (41 ft 2 1/4 in)	Genowefa Cejzik (POL)	6 February 1938	Poznań
13.11 m (43 ft 0 in)	Gisela Mauermayer (GER)	3 February 1940	Munich
14.22 m (46 ft 7 3/4 in)	Tatyana Sevryukova (URS)	1 February 1947	Moscow
14.47 m (47 ft 5 1/2 in)	Tatyana Sevryukova (URS)	1 February 1947	Leningrad
14.55 m (47 ft 8 3/4 in)	Tatyana Sevryukova (URS)	23 February 1948	Moscow
15.47 m (50 ft 9 in)	Galina Zybina (URS)	1 March 1953	Leningrad
16.03 m (52 ft 7 in)	Galina Zybina (URS)	31 October 1954	Leningrad
16.09 m (52 ft 9 1/4 in)	Galina Zybina (URS)	1 March 1958	Leningrad
16.38 m (53 ft 8 3/4 in)	Galina Zybina (URS)	9 March 1958	Leningrad
17.11 m (56 ft 1 1/2 in)	Tamara Press (URS)	17 January 1960	Leningrad
17.15 m (56 ft 3 in)	Tamara Press (URS)	19 March 1961	Leningrad
17.18 m (56 ft 4 1/4 in)	Tamara Press (URS)	28 March 1963	Leningrad
17.19 m (56 ft 4 3/4 in)	Renate Garisch (GDR)	9 February 1964	East Berlin
17.70 m (58 ft 3/4 in)	Tamara Press (URS)	2 April 1964	Leningrad
17.75 m (58 ft 2 3/4 in)	Tamara Press (URS)	26 March 1965	Leningrad
17.86 m (58 ft 7 in)	Nadezhda Chizhova (URS)	22 December 1967	Leningrad
18.28 m (59 ft 11 1/2 in)	Nadezhda Chizhova (URS)	28 January 1968	Leningrad
18.36 m (60 ft 2 3/4 in)	Nadezhda Chizhova (URS)	18 January 1970	Leningrad
18.44 m (60 ft 5 3/4 in)	Nadezhda Chizhova (URS)	1 February 1970	Moscow
18.60 m (61 ft 1/4 in)	Nadezhda Chizhova (URS)	15 March 1970	Vienna
18.62 m (61 ft 1 in)	Nadezhda Chizhova (URS)	16 January 1971	Leningrad
18.66 m (61 ft 2 1/2 in)	Margitta Gummel (GDR)	14 February 1971	East Berlin
18.74 m (61 ft 5 3/4 in)	Margitta Gummel (GDR)	20 February 1971	East Berlin
19.22 m (63 ft 1/2 in)	Margitta Gummel (GDR)	20 February 1971	East Berlin
19.35 m (63 ft 5 3/4 in)	Margitta Gummel (GDR)	20 February 1971	East Berlin
19.54 m (64 ft 1 1/4 in)	Margitta Gummel (GDR)	28 February 1971	East Berlin
19.70 m (64 ft 7 1/2 in)	Nadezhda Chizhova (URS)	13 March 1971	Sofia
20.36 m (66 ft 9 1/2 in)	Helena Fibingerova (TCH)	16 February 1974	Sofia
20.40 m (66 ft 11 in)	Nadezhda Chizhova (URS)	2 March 1974	Moscow
20.75 m (68 ft 3/4 in)	Helena Fibingerova (TCH)	9 March 1974	Gothenburg
21.13 m (69 ft 3 3/4 in)	Helena Fibingerova (TCH)	15 February 1975	Jablonec nad Nisou
21.58 m (70 ft 9 1/2 in)	Helena Fibingerova (TCH)	29 January 1977	Ostrava
21.60 m (70 ft 10 1/4 in)	Helena Fibingerova (TCH)	2 February 1977	Budapest
21.66 m (71 ft 3/4 in)	Helena Fibingerova (TCH)	2 February 1977	Budapest
22.50 m (73 ft 9 3/4 in)	Helena Fibingerova (TCH)	19 February 1977	Jablonec nad Nisou

=== Outdoor ===
Mark	Athlete	Date	Location
10.15 m	Violette Gouraud-Morris (FRA)	14 July 1924	Paris, France
11.57 m	Lilli Henoch (GER)	16 August 1925	Leipzig, Germany
10.84 m	Ruth Lange (GER)	28 May 1927	Prague, Czechoslovakia
11.32 m	Ruth Lange (GER)	6 August 1927	Breslau, Germany
11.52 m	Ruth Lange (GER)	3 June 1928	Berlin, Germany
11.96 m	Grete Heublein (GER)	15 July 1928	Berlin, Germany
12.85 m	Grete Heublein (GER)	21 July 1929	Frankfurt, Germany
12.88 m	Grete Heublein (GER)	28 June 1931	Paris, France
13.70 m	Grete Heublein (GER)	16 August 1931	Bielefeld, Germany
14.38 m	Gisela Mauermayer (GER)	15 July 1934	Warsaw, Poland
14.59 m	Tatyana Sevryukova (URS)	4 August 1948	Moscow, Soviet Union
14.86 m	Klavdia Tochonova (URS)	30 October 1949	Tbilisi, Soviet Union
15.02 m	Anna Andreyeva (URS)	9 November 1950	Ploiești, Romania
15.28 m	Galina Zybina (URS)	26 July 1952	Helsinki, Finland
15.37 m	Galina Zybina (URS)	20 September 1952	Frunze, Soviet Union
15.42 m	Galina Zybina (URS)	1 October 1952	Frunze, Soviet Union
16.20 m	Galina Zybina (URS)	9 October 1953	Malmö, Sweden
16.28 m	Galina Zybina (URS)	14 September 1954	Kyiv, Soviet Union
16.28 m	Galina Zybina (URS)	5 September 1955	Leningrad, Soviet Union
16.67 m	Galina Zybina (URS)	15 November 1955	Tbilisi, Soviet Union
16.76 m	Galina Zybina (URS)	13 October 1956	Tashkent, Soviet Union
17.25 m	Tamara Press (URS)	26 April 1959	Nalchik, Soviet Union
17.42 m	Tamara Press (URS)	16 July 1960	Moscow, Soviet Union
17.78 m	Tamara Press (URS)	13 August 1960	Moscow, Soviet Union
18.55 m	Tamara Press (URS)	10 June 1962	Leipzig, East Germany
18.55 m	Tamara Press (URS)	12 September 1962	Belgrade, Yugoslavia
18.59 m	Tamara Press (URS)	19 September 1965	Kassel, West Germany
18.67 m	Nadezhda Chizhova (URS)	28 April 1968	Sochi, Soviet Union
18.87 m	Margitta Gummel (GDR)	22 September 1968	Frankfurt (Oder), East Germany
19.07 m	Margitta Gummel (GDR)	20 October 1968	Mexico City, Mexico
19.61 m	Margitta Gummel (GDR)	20 October 1968	Mexico City, Mexico
19.72 m	Nadezhda Chizhova (URS)	30 May 1969	Moscow, Soviet Union
20.09 m	Nadezhda Chizhova (URS)	13 July 1969	Chorzów, Poland
20.10 m	Margitta Gummel (GDR)	11 September 1969	East Berlin, East Germany
20.10 m	Nadezhda Chizhova (URS)	16 September 1969	Athens, Greece
20.43 m	Nadezhda Chizhova (URS)	16 September 1969	Athens, Greece
20.43 m	Nadezhda Chizhova (URS)	29 August 1971	Moscow, Soviet Union
20.63 m	Nadezhda Chizhova (URS)	19 May 1972	Sochi, Soviet Union
21.03 m	Nadezhda Chizhova (URS)	7 September 1972	Munich, West Germany
21.20 m	Nadezhda Chizhova (URS)	28 August 1973	Lviv, Soviet Union
21.60 m	Marianne Adam (GDR)	6 August 1975	East Berlin, East Germany
21.67 m	Marianne Adam (GDR)	30 May 1976	Karl-Marx-Stadt, East Germany
21.87 m	Ivanka Khristova (BUL)	3 July 1976	Belmeken, Bulgaria
21.89 m	Ivanka Khristova (BUL)	4 July 1976	Belmeken, Bulgaria
21.99 m	Helena Fibingerová (TCH)	26 September 1976	Opava, Czechoslovakia
22.32 m	Helena Fibingerová (TCH)	20 August 1977	Nitra, Czechoslovakia
22.36 m	Ilona Slupianek (GDR)	2 May 1980	Celje, Yugoslavia
22.45 m	Ilona Slupianek (GDR)	11 May 1980	Potsdam, East Germany
22.53 m	Natalya Lisovskaya (URS)	27 May 1984	Sochi, Soviet Union
22.60 m	Natalya Lisovskaya (URS)	7 June 1987	Moscow, Soviet Union
22.63 m	Natalya Lisovskaya (URS)	7 June 1987	Moscow, Soviet Union

== See also ==
- Men's shot put world record progression
