= Irina Solontsova-Kudryavtseva =

Personal information
- Nationality: Soviet
- Born: 9 February 1937 (age 89)

Sport
- Sport: Athletics
- Event: Shot put

Irina Solontsova-Kudryavtseva (born 9 February 1937) is a Soviet athlete. She competed in the women's shot put at the 1968 Summer Olympics.
