= Ludwika Chewińska =

Polish shot putter

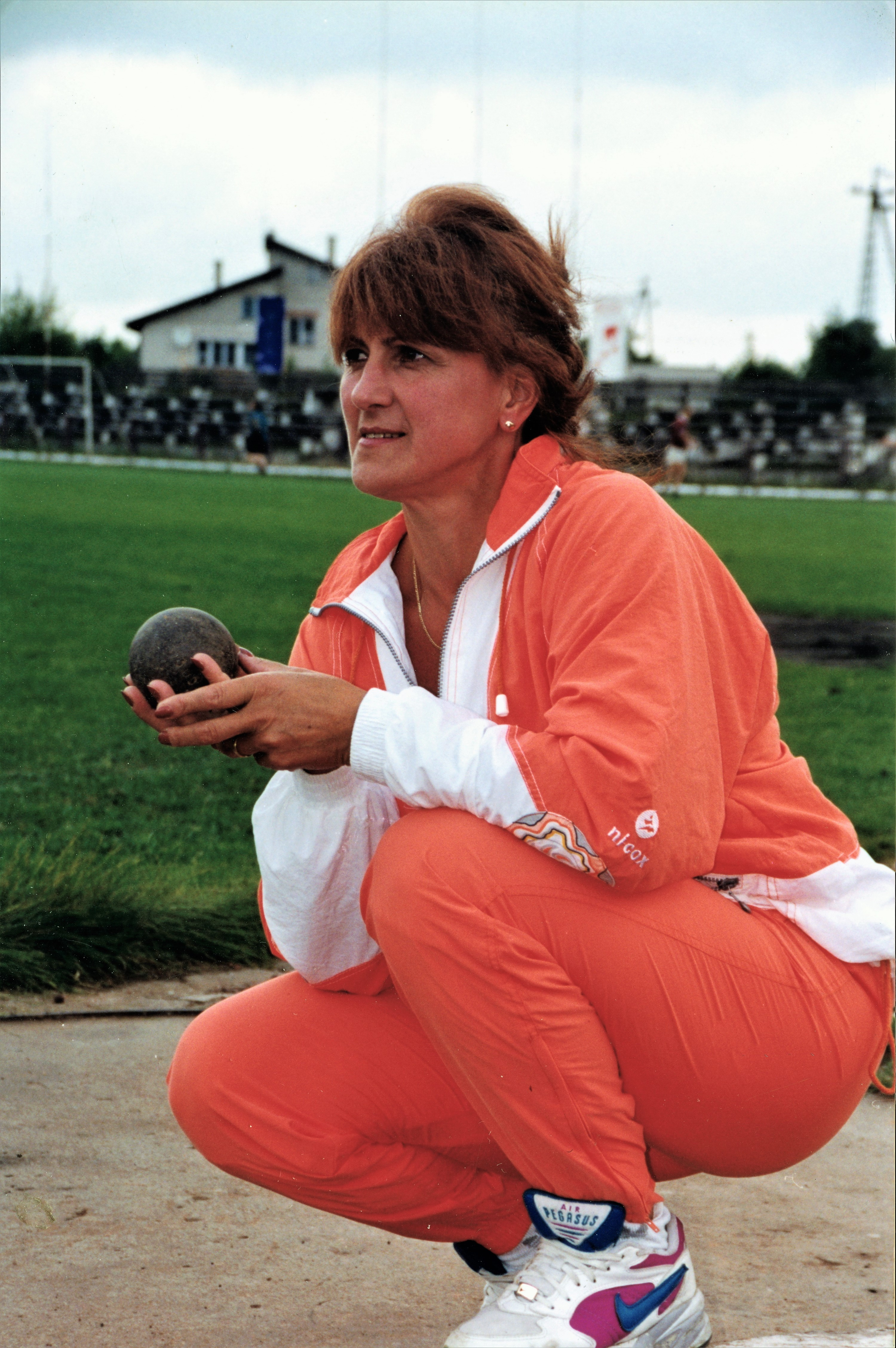

Personal information
- Nationality: Polish
- Born: 9 October 1948 (age 77) Raczek, Poland

Sport
- Sport: Athletics
- Event: Shot put
Medal record
Women's athletics
Representing Poland
European Indoor Championships
Silver medal – second place	1973 Rotterdam	Shot put

Ludwika Chewińska (born 9 October 1948) is a Polish athlete. She competed in the women's shot put at the 1972 Summer Olympics.
