= Radostina Vasekova =

Bulgarian athletics competitor

Personal information
- Nationality: Bulgarian
- Born: 10 February 1950 Sofia, Bulgaria
- Died: June 2015 (aged 65)

Sport
- Sport: Athletics
- Events: Shot put Discus
Medal record
Representing Bulgaria
Summer Universiade
Bronze medal – third place	1975 Rome	Discus throw
Bronze medal – third place	1977 Sofia	Discus throw

Radostina Vasekova (10 February 1950 – June 2015) was a Bulgarian athlete. She competed in the women's shot put and the women's discus throw at the 1972 Summer Olympics.
