= Els van Noorduyn =

Dutch shot putter

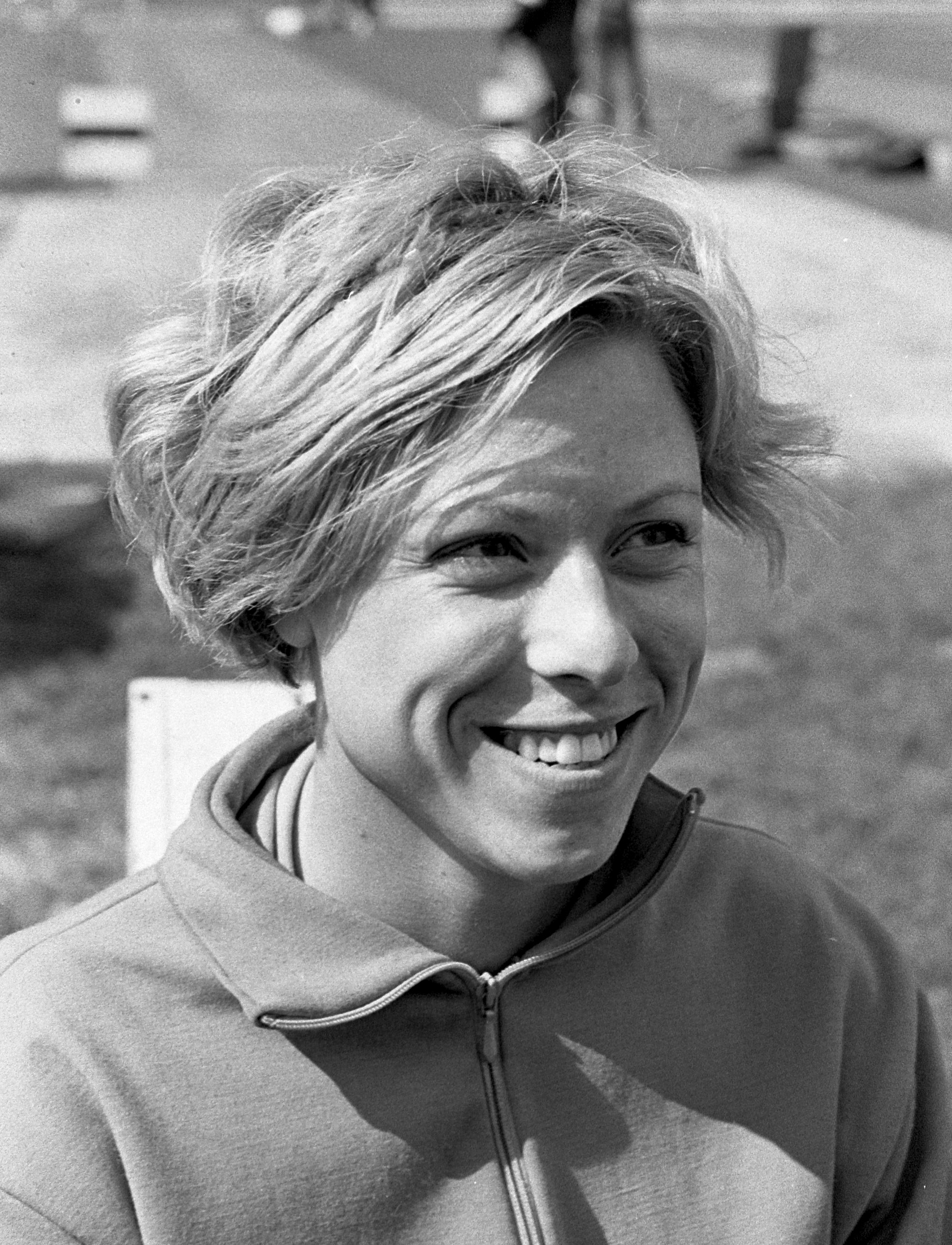
- Els van Noorduyn in 1968

Personal information
- Nationality: Dutch
- Born: 25 May 1946 (age 80) Amsterdam, Netherlands
- Height: 1.80 m (5 ft 11 in)
- Weight: 82 kg (181 lb)

Sport
- Sport: Athletics
- Event: Shot put
- Club: Sagitta, Amsterdam

Elsemia Marianne Helene "Els" van Noorduyn (born 25 May 1946) is a retired Dutch shot putter who competed at the 1968 Summer Olympics.

== Biography ==
Van Noorduyn finished second behind Brenda Bedford in the shot put event at the British 1967 WAAA Championships and finished second behind Margitta Gummel at the 1968 WAAA Championships.

At the 1968 Olympic Games in Mexico City, she represented the Netherlands and finished in eighth place in the shot out event, with a throw of 16.23 m.

She runs her sports-related company Els van Noorduyn B.V.

Awards
Preceded by Ilja Keizer-Laman	KNAU Cup; 1971	Succeeded by Ilja Keizer-Laman
