= Marita Lange =

East German shot putter (1943–2025)

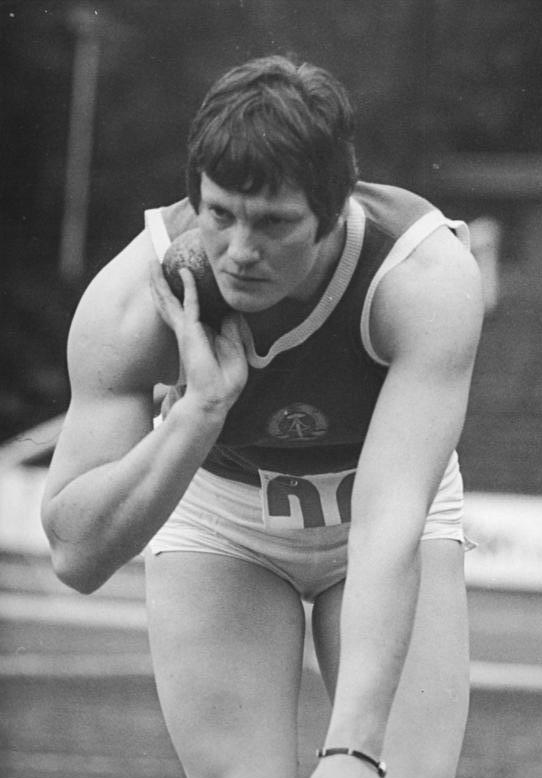
- Lange in 1972

Personal information
- Born: 22 June 1943 Halle, Prussia, Germany
- Died: 12 December 2025 (aged 82)
- Height: 1.82 m (6 ft 0 in)
- Weight: 86 kg (190 lb)

Sport
- Country: East Germany
- Sport: Athletics
- Event: Shot put
- Club: SV Halle
- Coached by: Lothar Hinz

Achievements and titles
- Personal best: 19.56 m or 64.2 ft (1969)
Medal record
Women's athletics
Representing East Germany
Olympic Games
Silver medal – second place	1968 Mexico City	Shot put
European Championships
Silver medal – second place	1971 Helsenki	Shot put
Bronze medal – third place	1966 Budapest	Shot put
Bronze medal – third place	1969 Athens	Shot put
European Indoor Championships
Gold medal – first place	1969 Belgrade	Shot put
Bronze medal – third place	1968 Madrid	Shot put
Bronze medal – third place	1970 Vienna	Shot put

Marita Lange (22 June 1943 – 12 December 2025) was an athlete from East Germany, who won the silver medal behind teammate Margitta Gummel in the shot put event at the 1968 Summer Olympics held in Mexico City, Mexico.

Lange died after a prolonged illness on 12 December 2025, at the age of 82.
