= Marianne Adam =

East German shot putter

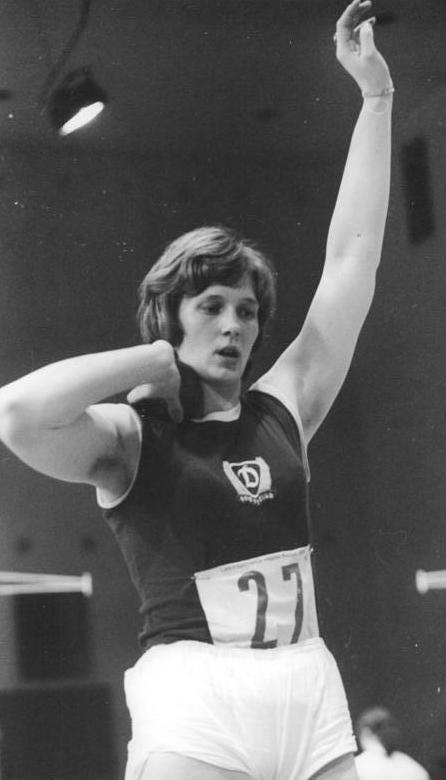
- Marianne Adam in 1975

Personal information
- Nationality: East Germany
- Born: 19 September 1951 (age 75) Luckenwalde, Brandenburg, East Germany
- Height: 1.83 m (6 ft 0 in)
- Weight: 85 kg (187 lb)

Sport
- Country: East Germany
- Sport: athletics
- Event: Shot put
- Club: SC Dynamo Berlin

Achievements and titles
- Personal best: 21.86 m (1979)
Medal record
Women's athletics
Representing East Germany
European Championships
Silver medal – second place	1974 Rome	Shot put
European Indoor Championships
Gold medal – first place	1975 Katowice	Shot put
Silver medal – second place	1979 Vienna	Shot put
Bronze medal – third place	1972 Grenoble	Shot put
Bronze medal – third place	1974 Gothenburg	Shot put

Marianne Adam (born 19 September 1951 in Luckenwalde, Brandenburg) is a retired shot putter who competed for East Germany in the 1970s. She was born in Luckenwalde. She was a member of SC Dynamo Berlin. She won the bronze medal at the 1974 European Athletics Championships, and at the European Indoor Championships she won one gold medal (1975), one silver medal (1979) and two bronze medals (1972, 1974).

Her personal best throw was 21.86 metres, which puts her sixth in the all-time performers list. She held the shot put world record from 6 August 1975 to 3 July 1976.

== Career highlights ==
- 1971, European Indoor Championships: fourth place (17.49 metres - 17.48 - 17.26 - 16.54 - 17.10 - 17.40)
- 1972, European Indoor Championships: bronze medal (18.30 - 17,95 - 17,81 - 17.75 - x - 17.87)
- 1972, Olympic Games: fifth place (18.75 - x - 18.58 - 18.94 - 18.91 - 18.71)
- 1974, European Indoor Championships: bronze medal (19.35 - 18.68 - 19.04 - 18.66 - 19.70 - 19.37)
- 1974, European Championships: silver medal (20.43 - 20.18 - 19.86 - x - 20.09 - 20.42)
- 1975, European Indoor Championships: gold medal (18.86 - 20.05 - 19.30 - 19.19 - 19.55 - 19.94)
- 1976, Olympic Games: fourth place (20.55 - x - x - x - 18.15 - 19.50)
- 1979, European Indoor Championships: silver medal (19.86 - 19.99 - 20.14 - 19.47 - 19.69 - 20.11)

Records
Preceded by Helena Fibingerová	Women's Shot Put World Record Holder; 6 August 1975 – 3 July 1976	Succeeded by Ivanka Khristova
