= Helena Fibingerová =

Czech shot putter (born 1949)

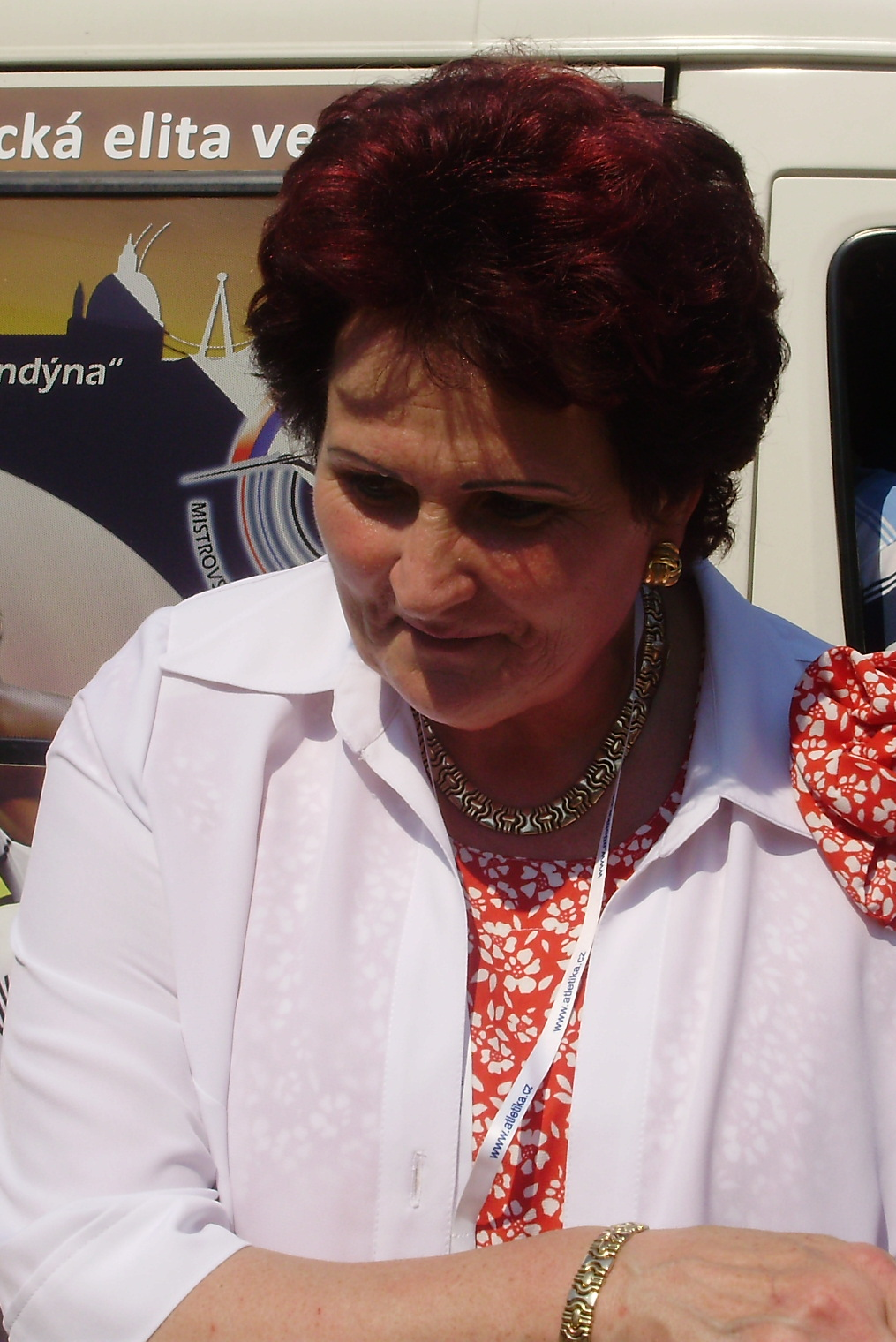
- Fibingerová in 2012

Personal information
- Nationality: Czech
- Born: July 13, 1949 (age 76) Víceměřice, Czechoslovakia (now Czech Republic)
- Height: 179 cm (5 ft 10 in)
- Weight: 90 kg (198 lb)

Sport
- Country: Czechoslovakia
- Sport: Athletics
- Event: Shot put

Achievements and titles
- Personal best: 22.32 m (1977)
Medal record
Women's athletics
Representing Czechoslovakia
Olympic Games
Bronze medal – third place	1976 Montreal	Shot put
World Championships
Gold medal – first place	1983 Helsinki	Shot put
European Championships
Silver medal – second place	1978 Prague	Shot put
Silver medal – second place	1982 Athens	Shot put
Bronze medal – third place	1974 Rome	Shot put
European Indoor Championships
Gold medal – first place	1973 Rotterdam	Shot put
Gold medal – first place	1974 Gothenburg	Shot put
Gold medal – first place	1977 San Sebastián	Shot put
Gold medal – first place	1978 Milan	Shot put
Gold medal – first place	1980 Sindelfingen	Shot put
Silver medal – second place	1975 Katowice	Shot put
Silver medal – second place	1981 Grenoble	Shot put

Helena Fibingerová (Czech pronunciation: [ˈɦɛlɛna ˈfɪbɪŋɡɛrovaː]) (born 13 July 1949 in Víceměřice, Olomouc Region) is a Czech shot putter who won an Olympic bronze medal in 1976 and became World champion in 1983. She also set three world records.

== World records ==
- 21.57 metres on 21 September 1974 in Gottwaldov
- 21.99 metres on 26 July 1976 in Opava
- 22.32 metres on 20 August 1977 in Nitra

Her latest record stood until 2 May 1980, when East German Ilona Slupianek improved it by four centimetres.

Fibingerová still holds the indoor world record with 22.50 metres, achieved on 19 February 1977 in Jablonec nad Nisou.

== International competitions ==
Year	Competition	Venue	Position	Notes
Representing Czechoslovakia
1972	Olympic Games	Munich, Germany	7th	18.81 m
1973	European Indoor Championships	Rotterdam, Netherlands	1st	19.08 m
1974	European Indoor Championships	Gothenburg, Sweden	1st	20.75 m
1974	European Championships	Rome, Italy	3rd	20.33 m
1975	European Indoor Championships	Katowice, Poland	2nd	19.97 m
1976	Olympic Games	Montreal, Canada	3rd	20.67 m
1977	European Indoor Championships	San Sebastián, Spain	1st	21.46 m
1978	European Indoor Championships	Milan, Italy	1st	20.67 m
1978	European Championships	Prague, Czechoslovakia	2nd	20.86 m
1980	European Indoor Championships	Sindelfingen, West Germany	1st	19.92 m
1981	European Indoor Championships	Grenoble, France	2nd	20.64 m
1982	European Indoor Championships	Milan, Italy	2nd	19.24 m
1982	European Championships	Athens, Greece	2nd	20.94 m
1983	European Indoor Championships	Budapest, Hungary	1st	20.61 m
1983	World Championships	Helsinki, Finland	1st	21.05 m
1984	European Indoor Championships	Gothenburg, Sweden	1st	20.34 m
1985	European Indoor Championships	Athens, Greece	1st	20.84 m
1986	European Championships	Stuttgart, West Germany	10th	18.48 m
1987	World Championships	Rome, Italy	8th	20.29 m

== Personal life ==
Fibingerová is a friend of Jana Nečasová, the former Czech Prime Minister's wife. She testified in court as a character witness in defence of Nečasová in relation to the 2013 Czech political corruption scandal, in which Nečasová and her husband stood accused.

Records
Preceded by Nadezhda Chizhova; Ivanka Khristova	Women's Shot Put World Record Holder; 21 September 1974 – 6 August 1975; 26 September 1976 – 2 May 1980	Succeeded by Marianne Adam; Ilona Slupianek
