= Margitta Gummel =

East German shot putter (1941–2021)

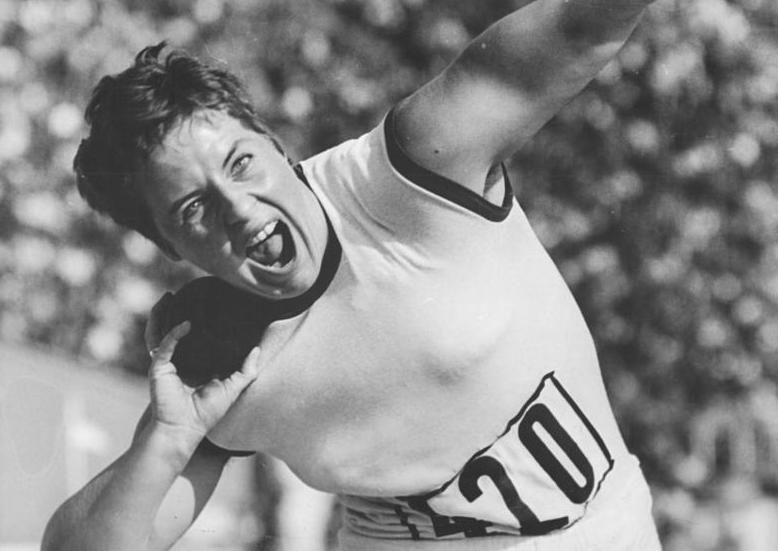
- Margitta Gummel in 1971

Personal information
- Nationality: East Germany; Germany
- Born: Margitta Helmbold; 29 June 1941 Magdeburg, Saxony, Prussia, Germany
- Died: 26 January 2021 (aged 79) Wietmarschen, Lower Saxony, Germany
- Height: 1.77 m (5 ft 10 in)
- Weight: 90 kg (198 lb)

Sport
- Sport: Athletics
- Event: Shot put
- Club: SC DHfK, Leipzig

Achievements and titles
- Personal best: 20.22 m (1972)
Medal record
Women's athletics
Representing East Germany
Olympic Games
Gold medal – first place	1968 Mexico City	Shot put
Silver medal – second place	1972 Munich	Shot put
European Championships
Silver medal – second place	1966 Budapest	Shot put
Silver medal – second place	1969 Athens	Shot put
Bronze medal – third place	1971 Helsenki	Shot put
European Indoor Championships
Gold medal – first place	1966 Dortmund	Shot put
Silver medal – second place	1968 Madrid	Shot put
Silver medal – second place	1971 Sofia	Shot put

Margitta Gummel (née Helmbold, 29 June 1941 – 26 January 2021) was a German Olympic gold medal-winning shot putter. She competed for the Unified German team in the 1964 Summer Olympics, East Germany in the 1968 Summer Olympics, and East Germany again at the 1972 Summer Olympics. She had a long rivalry with Nadezhda Chizhova of the Soviet Union.

== Career ==
Margitta Gummel did not win any medals in the 1964 Summer Olympics in Tokyo, where she competed in the shot put event. Later, at the 1968 Summer Olympics in Mexico City, she won a gold medal in the shot put event, and four years later, a silver medal in the 1972 Summer Olympics in Munich, having been beaten by her rival Nadezhda Chizhova. In the 1968 shot put event, she became the first woman to throw for more than 19 metres.

Gummel also competed for East Germany at the European Athletics Indoor Championships. In 1966, in Dortmund, she placed first in the shot put event. In 1968 in Madrid, she placed second in the shot put, beaten by Chizhova. At Sofia, in 1971, she also placed second in shot put, behind Chizhova.

She also competed in the European Athletics Championships. At the 1966 Championships, held in Budapest, she placed second in the women's shot put. Chizhova placed first. She later competed in the 1969 Championships, held in Athens, with the same results. She also participated in the 1971 Championships, held in Helsinki, but this time received third as her rival Chizhova placed first. Gummel won the British WAAA Championships title in the shot put event at the 1968 WAAA Championships.

It was later revealed that Gummel was one of the first East Germans to be administered steroids though she was not given her first dose of Turinabol until 28 July 1968, just under three months before the 1968 Games. A 1997 paper from the journal Clinical Chemistry reproduces charts from a 1973 DVfl scientific report that plot her Turinabol doses and competition distances for 1968, 1969 and 1972. The 1968 results show a two-metre improvement in the space of the three months leading to her Olympic gold, in a trained athlete whose previous results had been consistent.

Gummel was administered Turinabol at a dosage of merely 10 mg daily leading up to the 1968 Olympics where her throws improved from 17 m to 19 m in the three-month cycle. In the years following higher dosages of Turinabol were used with performance increasing in a dose dependent manner, and her throws improved to well over the 20m mark. The scientifically produced graphs listed in the 1997 Werner Franke report demonstrate that even when the steroids were stopped there was still a profound "residual" effect from the multiple steroid cycles administered and Gummel's performances were still significantly better off the drugs during breaks compared to 1968 before she had been exposed to them. Simply put, the GDR researchers commented that anabolic steroid use in females produced significant increases in athletic performance that were far superior to years of training naturally. The GDR then began experiments with Turinabol on much younger females at 13–14 years of age, particularly in sports such as swimming.

== See also ==
- Doping in East Germany

== Sources ==
- "Margitta Gummel-Helmbold Biography and Statistics". sports-reference.com. Sports Reference LLC. Archived from the original on 21 January 2009.
- "Margitta Gummel-Helmbold Olympic medals and stats". databaseolympics.com. Archived from the original on 19 February 2007.
- "European Indoor Championships". gbrathletics.com.
- "Budapest 66, Women's Results". athletix.org.
