= Nadezhda Chizhova =

Russian shot putter (born 1945)

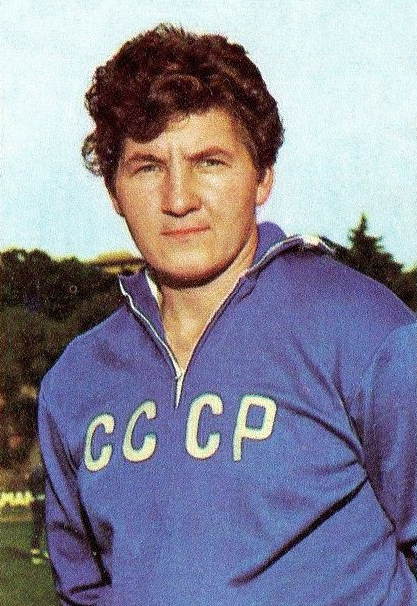

Personal information
- Born: 29 September 1945 (age 80) Usolye-Sibirskoye, Russian SFSR, Soviet Union
- Height: 1.74 m (5 ft 9 in)
- Weight: 90 kg (198 lb)

Sport
- Sport: Athletics
- Event: Shot put
- Club: Spartak St. Petersburg
- Coached by: Viktor Alekseyev

Achievements and titles
- Personal best: 21.45 m (1973)
Medal record
Women's athletics
Representing Soviet Union
Olympic Games
Bronze medal – third place	1968 Mexico City	Shot put
Gold medal – first place	1972 Munich	Shot put
Silver medal – second place	1976 Montreal	Shot put
European Championships
Gold medal – first place	1966 Budapest	Shot put
Gold medal – first place	1969 Athens	Shot put
Gold medal – first place	1971 Helsinki	Shot put
Gold medal – first place	1974 Rome	Shot put
European Indoor Championships
Bronze medal – third place	1966 Dortmund	Shot put
Gold medal – first place	1967 Prague	Shot put
Gold medal – first place	1968 Madrid	Shot put
Gold medal – first place	1970 Vienna	Shot put
Gold medal – first place	1971 Sofia	Shot put
Gold medal – first place	1972 Grenoble	Shot put
Silver medal – second place	1974 Gothenburg	Shot put
Summer Universiade
Silver medal – second place	1965 Budapest	Shot put
Gold medal – first place	1970 Turin	Shot put
Gold medal – first place	1973 Moscow	Shot put

Nadezhda Vladimirovna Chizhova (Russian: Надежда Владимировна Чижова, born 29 September 1945) is a retired Russian shot putter who won three Olympic medals and four European titles, and set seven new world records. She became the first woman to break both the 20 m (66 ft) and 21 m (69 ft) barriers. She retired after the 1976 Olympics and later worked as athletics coach in Saint Petersburg.

== Biography ==
Chizhova was the fourth child in a family, and lost her father at the age of four. She took up shot put aged 16. After graduating from a local medical school, in 1963 she moved to Saint Petersburg, to train with Viktor Alekseyev, a leading Soviet coach who raised top Soviet shot putters such as Tamara Press, Galina Zybina and Tamara Tyshkevich. Two years later Chizhova won the European junior title in the shot put and discus throw, and in 1966 won the regular European title in the shot put.

By 1968 Chizhova was the world record holder and an Olympic gold medal favorite, but she finished third due to a knee injury sustained while training. After recovering, she won the European titles in 1969 and 1971 and an Olympic gold medal in 1972. She retired in 1977, after placing second at the 1976 Olympics. She quoted two reasons for retirement: waning motivation, and the death of her coach (Alekseyev) in 1977. In retirement she gave birth to a daughter and had a long career as an athletics coach. One of her trainees, Larisa Peleshenko, won a silver medal in the shot put at the 2000 Olympics.

== World records ==
- 16.60 m (54.5 ft) in 1964 (world junior record)
- 18.67 m (61.3 ft) on 28 April 1968 in Sochi
- 19.72 m (64.7 ft) on 30 May 1969 in Moscow
- 20.09 m (65.9 ft) on 13 July 1969 in Chorzów
- 20.43 m (67.0 ft) on 16 September 1969 in Athens
- 20.63 m (67.7 ft) on 19 May 1972 in Sochi
- 21.03 m (69.0 ft) on 7 September 1972 in Munich
- 21.20 m (69.6 ft) on 28 August 1973 in Lviv

Her latest record stood until 21 September 1974 when Czechoslovak Helena Fibingerová improved it to 21.57 m (70.8 ft).

Records
Preceded by —	Women's Shot Put World Record Holder; 7 September 1972 – 21 September 1974	Succeeded by (Czechoslovakia) Helena Fibingerová
