= Ivanka Khristova =

Bulgarian shot putter (1941–2022)

Ivanka Hristova
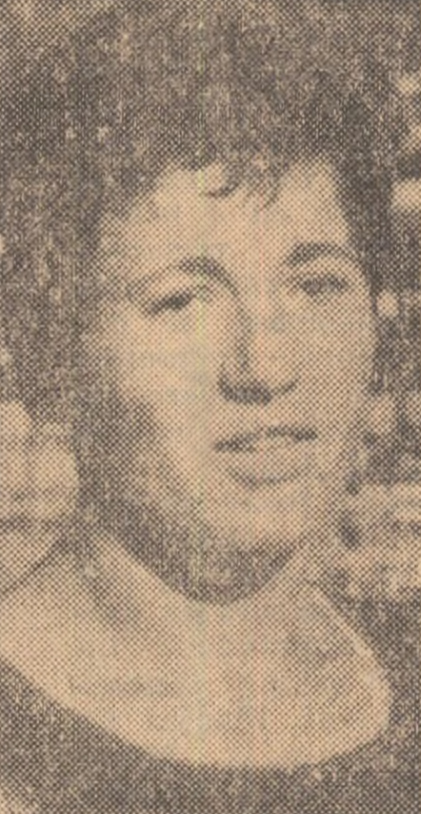

Personal information
- Nationality: Bulgarian
- Born: Ivanka Marinova Hristova; 19 November 1941 Osikovitsa, Bulgaria
- Died: 24 February 2022 (aged 80)
- Height: 172 cm (5 ft 8 in)
- Weight: 90 kg (198 lb)

Sport
- Country: Bulgaria
- Sport: Athletics
- Event: Shot put

Achievements and titles
- Personal best: 21.89 m (1976)
Medal record
Women's athletics
Representing Bulgaria
Olympic Games
Gold medal – first place	1976 Montreal	Shot put
Bronze medal – third place	1972 Munich	Shot put
European Indoor Championships
Gold medal – first place	1976 Munich	Shot put
Bronze medal – third place	1975 Katowice	Shot put

Ivanka Marinova Hristova (Bulgarian: Иванка Маринова Христова; 19 November 1941 – 24 February 2022) was a Bulgarian shot putter. She won the gold medal at the 1976 Summer Olympics, and the bronze in 1972. In addition she won the 1976 European Indoor Championships. Khristova died on 24 February 2022, at the age of 80.

== World records ==
- 21.87 metres on 3 July 1976 in Belmeken
- 21.89 metres on 5 July 1976 in Belmeken

Her latest record only stood until 26 September 1976 when Czechoslovak Helena Fibingerová improved it to 21.99 metres.

== Major achievements ==
Year	Competition	Venue	Position	Notes
Representing Bulgaria
1967	European Indoor Games	Prague, Czechoslovakia	2nd	
1969	European Indoor Games	Belgrade, Yugoslavia	2nd	
1972	Summer Olympics	Munich, West Germany	3rd	
1975	European Indoor Championships	Katowice, Poland	3rd	
1976	European Indoor Championships	Munich, West Germany	1st	
1976	Summer Olympics	Montreal, Canada	1st	21.16 m

Records
Preceded by (East Germany) Marianne Adam	Women's Shot Put World Record Holder; 3 July 1976 – 26 September 1976	Succeeded by (Czechoslovakia) Helena Fibingerová
