= 2013 World Youth Championships in Athletics – Boys' javelin throw =

Boys' javelin throw at the 2013 World Youth Championships in Athletics
- Venue: RSC Olimpiyskiy
- Dates: 12 July (qualification); 14 July (final)
- Competitors: 34
- Winning distance: 78.84 PB

Medalists
gold medal	Matija Muhar	Slovenia
silver medal	Norbert Rivasz-Tóth	Hungary
bronze medal	Pablo Bugallo	Spain

The boys' javelin throw at the 2013 World Youth Championships in Athletics was held on 12 and 14 July.

== Medalists ==
Gold	Silver	Bronze
Matija Muhar; Slovenia	Norbert Rivasz-Tóth; Hungary	Pablo Bugallo; Spain

== Records ==
Prior to the competition, the following records were as follows.

World Youth Best	Braian Toledo (ARG)	89.34	Mar del Plata, Argentina	6 March 2010
Championship Record	Morné Moolman (RSA)	83.16	Lille, France	9 July 2011
World Youth Leading	Miro Määttänen (FIN)	79.94	Janakkala, Finland	12 June 2013

== Qualification ==
Qualification rule: 71.00 (Q) or at least 12 best performers (q) qualified.

Rank	Group	Name	Nationality	#1	#2	#3	Result	Notes
1	A	Lassi Saarinen	Finland	x	68.01	78.65	78.65	Q, PB
2	A	Matija Muhar	Slovenia	x	69.14	76.73	76.73	Q
3	B	Oliver Helander	Finland	75.80			75.80	Q
4	A	Norbert Rivasz-Tóth	Hungary	x	70.48	74.01	74.01	Q
5	A	Christoph Müller	Germany	x	72.48		72.48	Q, PB
6	B	Shu Mori	Japan	71.89			71.89	Q, PB
7	B	Jarne Duchateau	Belgium	57.90	71.56		71.56	Q, PB
8	A	Pablo Bugallo	Spain	67.97	71.52		71.52	Q
9	A	Yin Dewen	China	71.06			71.06	Q
10	A	Denzel Pratt	Bahamas	69.78	70.88	63.16	70.88	q, PB
11	B	Dominic Strauß	Germany	64.15	70.69	65.90	70.69	q
12	A	Anderson Peters	Grenada	67.81	70.53	x	70.53	q, PB
13	B	Leon Laubser	South Africa	66.37	67.59	70.26	70.26	
14	A	José Munguía	Mexico	63.58	70.10	70.06	70.10	PB
15	B	Simon Litzell	Sweden	69.53	61.21	60.42	69.53	
16	B	Ioannis Kiriazis	Greece	59.28	62.16	69.39	69.39	
17	B	Edis Matusevičius	Lithuania	67.33	56.78	68.88	68.88	
18	A	Ayumu Ishiyama	Japan	68.20	x	64.53	68.20	PB
19	B	Neeraj Chopra	India	66.75	65.07	x	66.75	SB
20	A	Eli Verdú	Venezuela	66.62	63.94	64.48	66.62	
21	A	Oleksandr Kozubskyy	Ukraine	53.50	65.01	x	65.01	
22	B	Zoltán Holczauzer	Hungary	60.94	64.80	61.88	64.80	
23	A	Johannes Maree	South Africa	61.99	59.79	63.91	63.91	
24	B	Maximilian Slezák	Slovakia	62.35	x	63.86	63.86	
25	B	Vitaliy Polyanchykov	Ukraine	55.24	63.42	x	63.42	
26	A	Jairo Altamirano	Argentina	62.37	x	x	62.37	
27	B	Ding Song	China	61.64	61.76	59.91	61.76	
28	A	Mandeep Kumar	India	59.45	55.66	52.95	59.45	
29	A	Bang Ryu-hyun	South Korea	x	58.20	x	58.20	
30	B	Ivan Filippov	Russia	58.15	x	x	58.15	
31	B	Andrei David	Romania	55.99	54.46	57.08	57.08	
32	B	Vladislav Korostelev	Uzbekistan	x	x	55.77	55.77	
33	A	Tyler Kostiuk	Canada	50.19	x	53.58	53.58	
	B	Miha Uranič	Slovenia	x	x	x	NM	

== Final ==
Rank	Name	Nationality	#1	#2	#3	#4	#5	#6	Result	Notes
1st place, gold medalist(s)	Matija Muhar	Slovenia	78.84	x	67.04	x	68.98	–	78.84	PB
2nd place, silver medalist(s)	Norbert Rivasz-Tóth	Hungary	73.51	76.88	x	74.09	78.27	77.36	78.27	
3rd place, bronze medalist(s)	Pablo Bugallo	Spain	72.52	73.99	x	72.34	x	76.63	76.63	
4	Oliver Helander	Finland	75.36	x	x	69.16	x	x	75.36	
5	Lassi Saarinen	Finland	70.75	x	x	72.83	73.38	x	73.38	
6	Christoph Müller	Germany	67.79	72.83	x	68.97	69.57	x	72.83	PB
7	Jarne Duchateau	Belgium	x	58.11	71.27	71.37	x	x	71.37	
8	Dominic Strauß	Germany	69.10	x	x	x	70.12	x	70.12	
9	Anderson Peters	Grenada	58.76	67.98	65.61				67.98	
10	Shu Mori	Japan	66.07	55.25	55.49				66.07	
11	Denzel Pratt	Bahamas	64.20	61.10	60.91				64.20	
12	Yin Dewen	China	63.85	x	x				63.85	
