= Athletics at the 2024 Summer Olympics – Men's javelin throw =

Men's javelin throw at the Games of the XXXIII Olympiad
- Venue: Stade de France, Paris, France
- Date: 6 August 2024 (qualification) 8 August 2024 (final)
- Winning distance: 92.97 m OR AR

Medalists
1st place, gold medalist(s)		Arshad Nadeem	Pakistan
2nd place, silver medalist(s)		Neeraj Chopra	India
3rd place, bronze medalist(s)		Anderson Peters	Grenada

Official Video

The men's javelin throw at the 2024 Summer Olympics was held in Paris, France, on 6 and 8 August 2024. This is the 27th time that the event was contested at the Summer Olympics since its introduction in 1908.

== Records ==
Prior to the competition, the existing World and Olympic records were as follows.

World record	Jan Železný (CZE)	98.48	Jena, Germany	25 May 1996
Olympic record	Andreas Thorkildsen (NOR)	90.57	Beijing, China	23 August 2008
World Leading	Max Dehning (GER)	90.20	Halle, Germany	25 February 2024

Area records before the 2024 Summer Olympics
Area Record	Athlete (Nation)	Distance (m)
Africa (records)	Julius Yego (KEN)	92.72
Asia (records)	Cheng Chao-tsun (TPE)	91.36
Europe (records)	Jan Železný (CZE)	98.48 WR
North, Central America and Caribbean (records)	Anderson Peters (GRN)	93.07
Oceania (records)	Jarrod Bannister (AUS)	89.02
South America (records)	Luiz Maurício da Silva (BRA)	85.57

The following new Olympic and area records were set during this competition:

Date	Event	Athlete	Distance (m)	Notes
8 August	Final	Arshad Nadeem (PAK)	92.97	OR, AR
6 August	Qualification	Luiz Maurício da Silva (BRA)	85.91	AR

== Schedule ==
All times are UTC+2

The men's javelin throw took place over two separate days.

Date	Time	Round
Tuesday, 6 August 2024	10:10	Qualifying
Thursday, 8 August 2024	20:30	Final

== Qualification ==
For the men's javelin throw event, 32 athletes were eligible to qualify for the event with a maximum of three athletes per nation. The qualification could be secured either by achieving the entry standard of 85.50 m in the qualification period (between 1 July 2023 and 30 June 2024) or by the World Athletics Ranking for the event. A total of 11 athletes qualified by achieving the qualification standard and a further 21 athletes were granted entries based on their individual rankings.

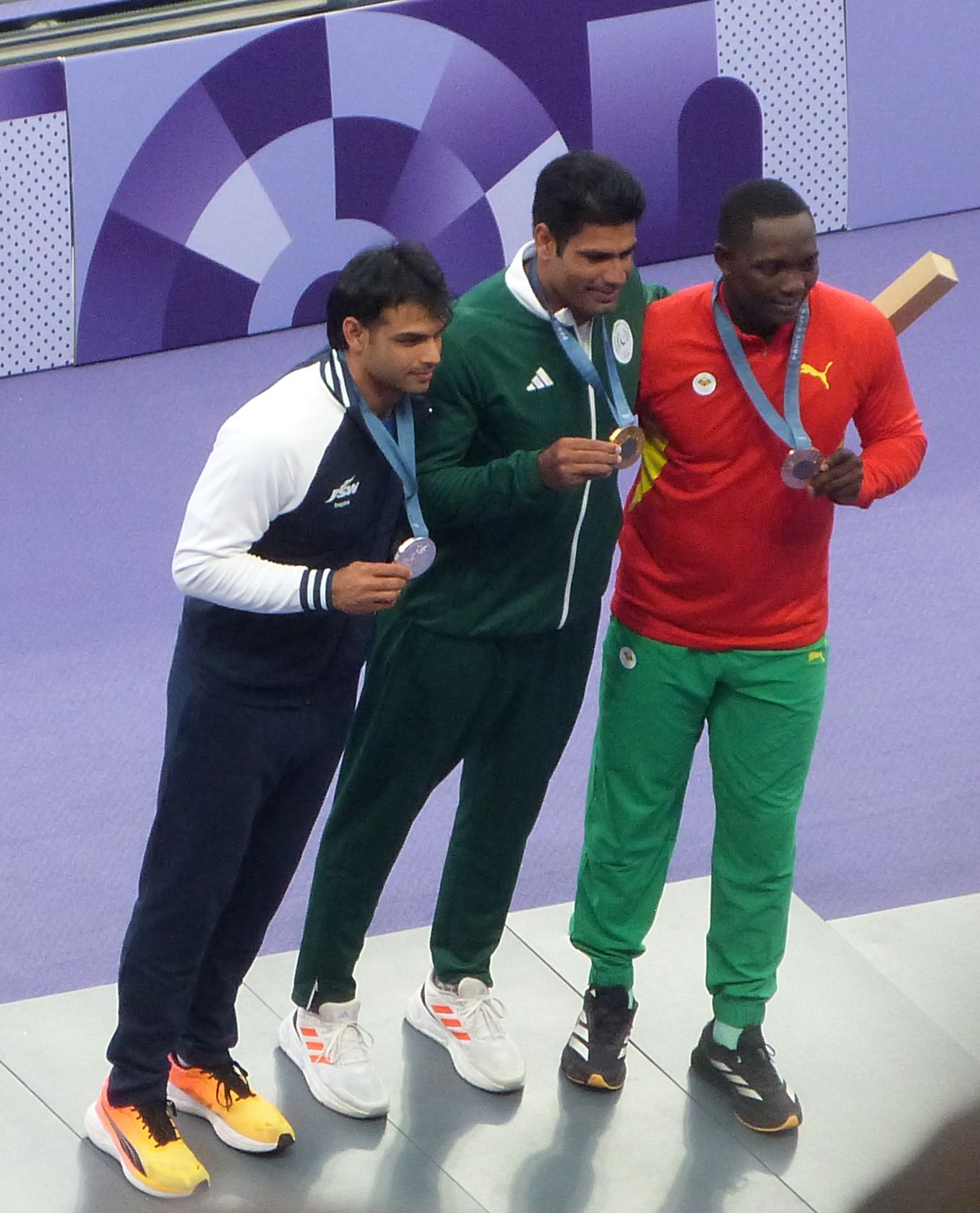
Men's javelin throw podium

The top two from the previous Olympics qualified for the event. Neeraj Chopra was the reigning Olympic and World champion, having won gold at the previous Olympics and 2023 World Championships. The silver medalist from Tokyo 2020 and reigning European champion Jakub Vadlejch also qualified for the event. The bronze medalist from three years earlier, Vítězslav Veselý had retired. Julius Yego, who was the 2016 Olympics silver medalist and 2015 World champion, and 2012 Olympic champion Keshorn Walcott also made the cut for the event. Other notable athletes who qualified included 2022 World champion and current NCAC record holder Anderson Peters, reigning Commonwealth Games champion and 2023 World championships silver medalist Arshad Nadeem, 2024 World leader Max Dehning, former European champion Julian Weber and South American record holder Luiz Maurício da Silva.

== Results ==
=== Qualification ===
The qualification was held on 6 August, starting at 10:10 (UTC+2) for Group A and 11:35 (UTC+2) for Group B with 32 athletes participating. As per the qualification rules, athletes achieving the qualifying standard of 84 m (Q) directly qualified for the final with other spots being filled by the best performers (q) for a field of 12 athletes.

In the qualifying rounds, nine athletes including Chopra, Nadeem, Peters, Silva Vadlejch and Weber qualified for the final directly after achieving the qualification standard. Dehning did not make it out of the qualifying round. Silva improved on his own South American record in qualifying.

Rank	Group	Athlete	Nationality	Distance (m)				Notes
Rank	Group	Athlete	Nationality	#1	#2	#3	Final	Notes
1	B	Neeraj Chopra	India	89.34	—	—	89.34	Q, SB
2	B	Anderson Peters	Grenada	88.63	—	—	88.63	Q, SB
3	A	Julian Weber	Germany	87.76	—	—	87.76	Q
4	B	Arshad Nadeem	Pakistan	86.59	—	—	86.59	Q, SB
5	A	Julius Yego	Kenya	78.84	80.76	85.97	85.97	Q, SB
6	B	Luiz Maurício da Silva	Brazil	81.62	83.21	85.91	85.91	Q, AR
7	A	Jakub Vadlejch	Czech Republic	85.63	—	—	85.63	Q
8	A	Toni Keränen	Finland	79.04	x	85.27	85.27	Q, PB
9	B	Andrian Mardare	Moldova	x	76.76	84.13	84.13	Q, SB
10	A	Oliver Helander	Finland	83.81	—	—	83.81	q
11	A	Keshorn Walcott	Trinidad and Tobago	74.89	83.02	82.57	83.02	q
12	B	Lassi Etelätalo	Finland	82.91	x	78.42	82.91	q
13	A	Genki Dean	Japan	82.48	x	77.40	82.48	SB
14	B	Marcin Krukowski	Poland	81.37	x	82.34	82.34	
15	B	Artur Felfner	Ukraine	x	81.84	74.54	81.84	
16	B	Cameron McEntyre	Australia	76.33	x	81.18	81.18	
17	A	Alexandru Novac	Romania	x	77.35	81.08	81.08	
18	A	Kishore Jena	India	80.73	x	80.21	80.73	
19	A	Pedro Henrique Rodrigues	Brazil	76.23	79.46	75.69	79.46	
20	B	Timothy Herman	Belgium	79.42	78.82	x	79.42	
21	B	Edis Matusevičius	Lithuania	x	x	79.40	79.40	
22	B	Max Dehning	Germany	74.58	75.10	79.24	79.24	
23	B	Cyprian Mrzyglód	Poland	78.50	x	77.16	78.50	
24	B	Chinecherem Nnamdi	Nigeria	77.53	x	76.45	77.53	
25	A	Patriks Gailums	Latvia	x	77.26	x	77.26	
26	A	Dawid Wegner	Poland	x	75.53	76.89	76.89	
27	A	Curtis Thompson	United States	76.79	x	74.24	76.79	
28	A	Leandro Ramos	Portugal	75.73	x	x	75.73	
29	B	Moustafa Mahmoud	Egypt	74.87	x	x	74.87	
30	A	Ihab Abdelrahman	Egypt	72.98	x	x	72.98	
	B	Gatis Cakšs	Latvia	x	x	x	NM	
	A	Teuraiterai Tupaia	France	x	x	x	NM	

=== Final ===
The final was held on 8 August, starting at 20:30 (UTC+2) in the evening. In the finals, Peters registered the first throw of above 84 metres with a 84.7 m effort, which was bettered only by Walcott with a 86.16 m attempt. In the second round of attempts, Vadlejch threw 84.52 m and rose to third in the classification, before Peters took the lead with a 87.87 m throw. Nadeem registered a huge 92.97 m throw in his second attempt to set a new Olympic Record and moved into first place. Weber threw 87.33 m and moved into third place, which was soon taken over by Yego with an improved throw of 87.72 m.

Two more throws later, Chopra registered a 89.45 m throw on his first valid attempt and moved into the silver medal position in the overall classification. Vadlejch started the third series of attempts with a 88.50 m throw, which moved him into third place again. But Peters took it off him later with a 88.54 m throw in his fourth attempt. Chopra fouled out on his remaining throws and no one else registered a legal throw beyond 89 m. Though Nadeem's gold was confirmed after Chopra's last fouled attempt, he registered another long throw of 91.79 m in his final attempt to close the proceedings.

Rank	Athlete	Nationality	Distance (m)							Notes
Rank	Athlete	Nationality	#1	#2	#3	#4	#5	#6	Final	Notes
1st place, gold medalist(s)	Arshad Nadeem	Pakistan	X	92.97	88.72	79.40	84.87	91.79	92.97	AR, OR, WL
2nd place, silver medalist(s)	Neeraj Chopra	India	X	89.45	X	X	X	X	89.45	SB
3rd place, bronze medalist(s)	Anderson Peters	Grenada	84.70	87.87	X	88.54	87.38	81.83	88.54	
4	Jakub Vadlejch	Czech Republic	80.15	84.52	88.50	X	84.98	83.27	88.50	
5	Julius Yego	Kenya	80.29	87.72	X	84.90	83.20	81.58	87.72	SB
6	Julian Weber	Germany	X	87.33	X	86.85	87.40	84.09	87.40	
7	Keshorn Walcott	Trinidad and Tobago	86.16	X	82.89	78.96	76.86	-	86.16	SB
8	Lassi Etelätalo	Finland	78.81	77.60	84.58	82.02	X	81.69	84.58	
9	Oliver Helander	Finland	81.24	82.68	X	did not advance			82.68	
10	Toni Keränen	Finland	80.92	75.33	78.90	did not advance			80.92	
11	Luiz da Silva	Brazil	80.67	78.67	X	did not advance			80.67	
12	Andrian Mardare	Moldova	79.14	80.10	77.77	did not advance			80.10	
