= 2014 World Junior Championships in Athletics – Men's javelin throw =

The men's javelin throw event at the 2014 World Junior Championships in Athletics was held in Eugene, Oregon, USA, at Hayward Field on 25 and 27 July.

== Medalists ==
Gold	Gatis Čakšs; Latvia
Silver	Matija Muhar; Slovenia
Bronze	Andrian Mardare; Moldova

== Results ==
=== Final ===
27 July
Start time: 15:24 Temperature: 28 °C Humidity: 37 %
End time: 16:29 Temperature: 29 °C Humidity: 35 %

Rank	Name	Nationality	Attempts						Result	Notes
Rank	Name	Nationality	1	2	3	4	5	6	Result	Notes
1st place, gold medalist(s)	Gatis Čakšs	Latvia	70.65	70.21	70.06	70.70	70.89	74.04	74.04	PB
2nd place, silver medalist(s)	Matija Muhar	Slovenia	71.72	72.97	69.53	70.09	66.52	x	72.97	
3rd place, bronze medalist(s)	Andrian Mardare	Moldova	72.81	x	67.20	x	68.77	69.83	72.81	
4	Jonas Bonewit	Germany	71.62	69.15	68.36	x	x	71.05	71.62	
5	Shakeil Waithe	Trinidad and Tobago	70.15	x	70.78	x	x	68.14	70.78	
6	Edis Matusevičius	Lithuania	68.97	66.85	69.96	70.58	70.54	65.09	70.58	
7	Ioánnis Kiriazís	Greece	70.38	x	x	64.72	64.77	65.90	70.38	
8	Shu Mori	Japan	69.73	69.66	66.75	67.34	64.70	x	69.73	
9	Hsu Shui-Chang	Chinese Taipei	67.94	x	61.57				67.94	
10	Takuto Kominami	Japan	x	67.07	66.95				67.07	
11	Mateusz Kwaśniewski	Poland	x	66.10	x				66.10	
12	Sindri Guðmundsson	Iceland	65.61	62.74	x				65.61	

=== Qualifications ===
25 July
With qualifying standard of 72.00 (Q) or at least the 12 best performers (q) advance to the Final

==== Summary ====
Rank	Name	Nationality	Result	Notes
1	Andrian Mardare	Moldova	74.46	Q PB
2	Matija Muhar	Slovenia	70.69	q
3	Jonas Bonewit	Germany	70.43	q
4	Sindri Guðmundsson	Iceland	69.99	q
5	Shu Mori	Japan	69.67	q
6	Ioánnis Kiriazís	Greece	69.19	q
7	Gatis Čakšs	Latvia	68.38	q
8	Shakeil Waithe	Trinidad and Tobago	68.19	q
9	Edis Matusevičius	Lithuania	67.64	q
10	Hsu Shui-Chang	Chinese Taipei	67.19	q
11	Takuto Kominami	Japan	67.02	q
12	Mateusz Kwaśniewski	Poland	66.70	q
13	George Zaharia	Romania	66.60	
14	Nicolás Quijera	Spain	66.19	
15	Norbert Rivasz-Tóth	Hungary	66.02	
16	Majid Mohsen Ali Al-Badri	Egypt	65.37	
17	Curtis Thompson	United States	64.89	
18	Pieter Kriel	South Africa	64.85	
19	Mateusz Strzeszewski	Poland	63.86	
20	Mikalai Klimuk	Belarus	63.57	
21	Alan Ferber	Israel	63.48	
22	Pablo Bugallo	Spain	63.34	
23	Rhys Stein	Australia	62.68	
24	Quincy Andersson	Sweden	61.58	
25	Maximilian Slezák	Slovakia	61.45	
26	Raul Stefan Rusu	Romania	61.36	
27	Jarne Duchateau	Belgium	61.20	
28	Choe Deokyeong	South Korea	60.34	
29	Parvinder Kumar	India	59.59	
30	Ante-Roko Zemunik	Croatia	55.92	
	Freddie Curtis	United Kingdom	NM	

==== Details ====
With qualifying standard of 72.00 (Q) or at least the 12 best performers (q) advance to the Final

===== Group A =====
27 July
Start time; 12:35 Temperature: 22 °C Humidity: 50 %
End time: 13:16 Temperature: 24 °C Humidity: 41 %

Rank	Name	Nationality	Attempts			Result	Notes
Rank	Name	Nationality	1	2	3	Result	Notes
1	Andrian Mardare	Moldova	74.46			74.46	Q PB
2	Matija Muhar	Slovenia	70.55	70.69	x	70.69	q
3	Jonas Bonewit	Germany	67.20	66.45	70.43	70.43	q
4	Sindri Guðmundsson	Iceland	60.90	60.21	69.99	69.99	q
5	Ioánnis Kiriazís	Greece	68.39	65.18	69.19	69.19	q
6	Shakeil Waithe	Trinidad and Tobago	68.19	x	x	68.19	q
7	Takuto Kominami	Japan	x	64.60	67.02	67.02	q
8	Mateusz Strzeszewski	Poland	x	63.86	x	63.86	
9	Alan Ferber	Israel	60.82	63.48	59.25	63.48	
10	Pablo Bugallo	Spain	61.28	63.34	61.22	63.34	
11	Rhys Stein	Australia	59.88	55.84	62.68	62.68	
12	Raul Stefan Rusu	Romania	61.36	x	59.87	61.36	
13	Jarne Duchateau	Belgium	59.83	x	61.20	61.20	
14	Parvinder Kumar	India	58.85	x	59.59	59.59	
	Freddie Curtis	United Kingdom	x	x	x	NM	

===== Group B =====
27 July
Start time; 13:53 Temperature: 24 °C Humidity: 41 %
End time: 14:36 Temperature: 26 °C Humidity: 37 %

Rank	Name	Nationality	Attempts			Result	Notes
Rank	Name	Nationality	1	2	3	Result	Notes
1	Shu Mori	Japan	67.53	66.03	69.67	69.67	q
2	Gatis Čakšs	Latvia	68.38	x	x	68.38	q
3	Edis Matusevičius	Lithuania	64.89	62.01	67.64	67.64	q
4	Hsu Shui-Chang	Chinese Taipei	x	65.95	67.19	67.19	q
5	Mateusz Kwasniewski	Poland	x	66.70	x	66.70	q
6	George Zaharia	Romania	65.01	x	66.60	66.60	
7	Nicolás Quijera	Spain	65.19	63.83	66.19	66.19	
8	Norbert Rivasz-Tóth	Hungary	66.02	62.44	60.28	66.02	
9	Majid Mohsen Ali Al-Badri	Egypt	60.92	65.37	63.50	65.37	
10	Curtis Thompson	United States	61.30	64.59	64.89	64.89	
11	Pieter Kriel	South Africa	64.85	x	61.22	64.85	
12	Mikalai Klimuk	Belarus	63.57	62.17	x	63.57	
13	Quincy Andersson	Sweden	x	x	61.58	61.58	
14	Maximilian Slezák	Slovakia	x	61.45	x	61.45	
15	Choe Deokyeong	South Korea	60.34	58.71	54.90	60.34	
16	Ante-Roko Zemunik	Croatia	x	x	55.92	55.92	

== Participation ==
According to an unofficial count, 31 athletes from 27 countries participated in the event.

- Australia (1)
- Belarus (1)
- Belgium (1)
- Chinese Taipei (1)
- Croatia (1)
- Egypt (1)
- Germany (1)
- Greece (1)
- Hungary (1)
- Iceland (1)
- India (1)
- Israel (1)
- Japan (2)
- Latvia (1)
- Lithuania (1)
- Moldova (1)
- Poland (2)
- Romania (2)
- Slovakia (1)
- Slovenia (1)
- South Africa (1)
- South Korea (1)
- Spain (2)
- Sweden (1)
- Trinidad and Tobago (1)
- United Kingdom (1)
- United States (1)
