= Athletics at the 2020 Summer Olympics – Men's javelin throw =

Men's javelin throw at the Games of the XXXII Olympiad
- Olympic Athletics
- Venue: Japan National Stadium
- Dates: 4 August 2021 (qualifying); 7 August 2021 (final)
- Competitors: 32 from 22 nations
- Winning distance: 87.58 m

Medalists
1st place, gold medalist(s)		Neeraj Chopra	India
2nd place, silver medalist(s)		Jakub Vadlejch	Czech Republic
3rd place, bronze medalist(s)		Vítězslav Veselý	Czech Republic

Official Replay

The men's javelin throw event at the 2020 Summer Olympics took place on 4 and 7 August 2021 at the Japan National Stadium. Approximately 35 athletes competed; the exact number depended on how many nations use universality places to enter athletes in addition to the 32 qualifying through distance or ranking (one universality place was used in 2016).

== Summary ==
Defending champion Thomas Röhler's results fell off back in 2019. He was not back to defend his title out of a strong German team. Silver medalist Julius Yego and bronze medalist Keshorn Walcott were back. 2019 World Champion Anderson Peters was also here, but the top thrower since the last Olympics was 2017 World Champion Johannes Vetter, who had the seven best throws of the year and an outlandish 97.76m in the COVID shortened 2020 season, which placed him #2 in history. Two of his early season 2021 throws could also claim the same position had he not thrown 97.76. The next best thrower of the season was Marcin Krukowski. 2017 silver medalist Jakub Vadlejch was in the mix of challengers behind Vetter.

Three got automatic qualifiers in their first attempts. Neeraj Chopra, Lassi Etelätalo and Julian Weber. Vetter and Vadlejch took three attempts just to make a qualifier. Yego, Walcott, Peters and Krukowski did not make the final.

On the first throw of the final of the competition, Chopra launched 87.03 to take the early lead. Weber threw 85.30 to move into second place. Vadlejch threw 83.98 to sit in third place. In the second round, Chopra extended his lead with a 87.58 m (287 ft 4 in), which proved to be the winner. No other thrower came close to 82m in the second round. The third round had to settle who got three more throws. At the beginning of the round, Veselý was the #8 qualifier at 80.30m. Andrian Mardare improved his position with 82.84m then Veselý threw 85.44m to take over second place and pushing everyone else down. Lassi Etelätalo moved up with 83.28m. Vetter came up in 7th place off of his first round 82.58m and remained there after he threw barely over 75m and deliberately fouled. 8th place Arshad Nadeem came up and improved his mark to 84.62m, he had earlier made history by becoming the first ever Pakistani athlete to qualify for a track and field final at the Olympics. And the last thrower in the round, Aliaksei Katkavets landed his 83.71m away. The overwhelming number one thrower in the world was gone, he would get no more throws to challenge Chopra or the others. Nobody was able to improve in the fourth round. In the fifth round, Vadlejch leapfrogged from fifth to the silver medal with a 86.67m. The sixth round ended in a whimper as each of the contenders tried to get their best throw to challenge Chopra only to foul or have a below average result.

Chopra's gold medal was the first track medal for the nation of India and the first in over a century for an athlete from that geographical region.

== Qualification ==
A National Olympic Committee (NOC) could enter up to 3 qualified athletes in the men's javelin throw event if all athletes meet the entry standard or qualify by ranking during the qualifying period. (The limit of 3 has been in place since the 1930 Olympic Congress.) The qualifying standard is 85.00 metres. This standard was "set for the sole purpose of qualifying athletes with exceptional performances unable to qualify through the IAAF World Rankings pathway." The world rankings, based on the average of the best five results for the athlete over the qualifying period and weighted by the importance of the meet, will then be used to qualify athletes until the cap of 32 is reached.

The qualifying period was originally from 1 May 2019 to 29 June 2020. Due to the COVID-19 pandemic, the period was suspended from 6 April 2020 to 30 November 2020, with the end date extended to 29 June 2021. The world rankings period start date was also changed from 1 May 2019 to 30 June 2020; athletes who had met the qualifying standard during that time were still qualified, but those using world rankings would not be able to count performances during that time. The qualifying time standards could be obtained in various meets during the given period that have the approval of the IAAF. Both outdoor and indoor meets are eligible. The most recent Area Championships may be counted in the ranking, even if not during the qualifying period.

NOCs can also use their universality place—each NOC can enter one male athlete regardless of time if they had no male athletes meeting the entry standard for an athletics event—in the javelin throw.

=== Men's javelin throw ===
Entry number: 32.

Qualification standard	No. of athletes	NOC	Nominated athletes
Entry standard – 85.00	3	Finland	Oliver Helander; Toni Kuusela; Lassi Etelätalo
Entry standard – 85.00	3	Germany	Bernhard Seifert; Johannes Vetter; Julian Weber
Entry standard – 85.00	2	Belarus	Aliaksei Katkavets; Pavel Mialeshka
Entry standard – 85.00	2	Chinese Taipei	Cheng Chao-tsun; Huang Shih-feng
Entry standard – 85.00	2	India	Neeraj Chopra; Shivpal Singh
Entry standard – 85.00	1	Estonia	~~Magnus Kirt~~
Entry standard – 85.00	1	Grenada	Anderson Peters
Entry standard – 85.00	1	Kenya	Julius Yego
Entry standard – 85.00	1	Latvia	Gatis Čakšs
Entry standard – 85.00	1	Lithuania	Edis Matusevičius
Entry standard – 85.00	1	Moldova	Andrian Mardare
Entry standard – 85.00	1	Pakistan	Arshad Nadeem
Entry standard – 85.00	1	Poland	Marcin Krukowski
Entry standard – 85.00	1	~~ROC~~	~~Dmitry Tarabin~~
Entry standard – 85.00	1	South Africa	Rocco van Rooyen
Entry standard – 85.00	1	Sweden	Kim Amb
Entry standard – 85.00	1	Trinidad and Tobago	Keshorn Walcott
Entry standard – 85.00	2	Czech Republic	Jakub Vadlejch
World ranking	2	Czech Republic	Vítězslav Veselý
World ranking	2	United States	Michael Shuey; Curtis Thompson
World ranking	1	Czech Republic	Vítězslav Veselý
World ranking	1	Egypt	Ihab Abdelrahman
World ranking	1	Hungary	Norbert Rivasz-Tóth
World ranking	1	Japan	Takuto Kominami
World ranking	1	Poland	Cyprian Mrzygłód
World ranking	1	Romania	Alexandru Novac
World ranking	1	Spain	Odei Jainaga
Total	32		

== Records ==
Prior to this competition, the existing global and area records were as follows:

World record	Jan Železný (CZE)	98.48	Jena, Germany	25 May 1996
Olympic record	Andreas Thorkildsen (NOR)	90.57	Beijing, China	23 August 2008
World Leading	Johannes Vetter (GER)	96.29	Chorzów, Poland	29 May 2021

Area	Distance (m)	Athlete	Nation
Africa (records)	92.72	Julius Yego	Kenya
Asia (records)	91.36	Cheng Chao-tsun	Chinese Taipei
Europe (records)	98.48 WR	Jan Železný	Czech Republic
North, Central America and Caribbean (records)	91.29	Breaux Greer	United States
Oceania (records)	89.02	Jarrod Bannister	Australia
South America (records)	84.70	Edgar Baumann	Paraguay

== Schedule ==
All times are Japan Standard Time (UTC+9)

The men's javelin throw took place over two separate days.

Date	Time	Round
Wednesday, 4 August 2021	9:00	Qualifying
Saturday, 7 August 2021	19:00	Final

== Results ==
=== Qualifying ===
Qualification Rules: Qualifying performance 83.50 (Q) or at least 12 best performers (q) advance to the Final

Rank	Group	Athlete	Nation	#1	#2	#3	Distance	Notes
1	A	Neeraj Chopra	India	86.65	—	—	86.65	Q
2	A	Johannes Vetter	Germany	82.04	82.08	85.64	85.64	Q
3	B	Arshad Nadeem	Pakistan	78.50	85.16	—	85.16	Q
4	B	Jakub Vadlejch	Czech Republic	79.27	78.96	84.93	84.93	Q, SB
5	A	Lassi Etelätalo	Finland	84.50	—	—	84.50	Q, SB
6	B	Julian Weber	Germany	84.41	—	—	84.41	Q
7	A	Alexandru Novac	Romania	83.27	80.90	X	83.27	q, SB
8	A	Vítězslav Veselý	Czech Republic	X	83.04	X	83.04	q, SB
9	B	Aliaksei Katkavets	Belarus	81.08	81.73	82.72	82.72	q
10	B	Andrian Mardare	Moldova	80.69	78.95	82.70	82.70	q
11	A	Pavel Mialeshka	Belarus	X	82.17	82.64	82.64	q
12	A	Kim Amb	Sweden	82.40	79.87	X	82.40	q, SB
13	A	Ihab Abdelrahman	Egypt	81.67	81.92	X	81.92	
14	A	Edis Matusevičius	Lithuania	79.50	81.24	80.13	81.24	
15	B	Anderson Peters	Grenada	80.42	79.71	78.28	80.42	
16	B	Keshorn Walcott	Trinidad and Tobago	76.13	79.13	79.33	79.33	
17	B	Oliver Helander	Finland	78.81	X	X	78.81	
18	A	Gatis Čakšs	Latvia	X	78.73	78.02	78.73	
19	B	Takuto Kominami	Japan	72.56	78.39	78.07	78.39	
20	A	Cyprian Mrzygłód	Poland	X	X	78.33	78.33	
21	B	Curtis Thompson	United States	78.20	78.09	77.89	78.20	
22	A	Norbert Rivasz-Tóth	Hungary	77.76	77.11	X	77.76	
23	A	Rocco van Rooyen	South Africa	77.41	74.40	X	77.41	
24	B	Julius Yego	Kenya	X	X	77.34	77.34	SB
25	A	Huang Shih-feng	Chinese Taipei	76.17	X	77.16	77.16	
26	A	Toni Kuusela	Finland	72.75	76.96	X	76.96	
27	B	Shivpal Singh	India	76.40	74.80	74.81	76.40	
28	B	Marcin Krukowski	Poland	X	74.65	X	74.65	
29	B	Odei Jainaga	Spain	73.11	70.77	X	73.11	
30	B	Cheng Chao-tsun	Chinese Taipei	68.18	71.20	X	71.20	
31	B	Bernhard Seifert	Germany	X	X	68.30	68.30	
	A	Michael Shuey	United States	X	X	X	NM	

=== Final ===
Rank	Athlete	Nation	#1	#2	#3	#4	#5	#6	Distance	Notes
1st place, gold medalist(s)	Neeraj Chopra	India	87.03	87.58	76.79	X	X	84.24	87.58	
2nd place, silver medalist(s)	Jakub Vadlejch	Czech Republic	83.98	X	X	82.86	86.67	X	86.67	SB
3rd place, bronze medalist(s)	Vítězslav Veselý	Czech Republic	79.73	80.30	85.44	X	84.98	X	85.44	SB
4	Julian Weber	Germany	85.30	77.90	78.00	83.10	85.15	75.72	85.30	SB
5	Arshad Nadeem	Pakistan	82.40	X	84.62	82.91	81.98	X	84.62	
6	Aliaksei Katkavets	Belarus	82.49	81.03	83.71	79.24	X	X	83.71	
7	Andrian Mardare	Moldova	81.16	81.73	82.84	81.90	83.30	81.09	83.30	
8	Lassi Etelätalo	Finland	78.43	76.59	83.28	79.20	79.99	83.05	83.28	
9	Johannes Vetter	Germany	82.52	X	X	did not advance			82.52	
10	Pavel Mialeshka	Belarus	82.28	79.34	78.13	did not advance			82.28	
11	Kim Amb	Sweden	77.22	78.31	79.69	did not advance			79.69	
12	Alexandru Novac	Romania	77.03	79.29	X	did not advance			79.29	
