= 2017 European Athletics U23 Championships – Men's javelin throw =

The men's javelin throw event at the 2017 European Athletics U23 Championships was held in Bydgoszcz, Poland, at Zdzisław Krzyszkowiak Stadium on the 13th and 15th of July.

== Medalists ==
| Gold | Norbert Rivasz-Tóth; Hungary |
| Silver | Ioannis Kiriazis; Greece |
| Bronze | Andrian Mardare; Moldova |

== Results ==
=== Qualification ===
13 July

Qualification rule: 74.00 (Q) or the 12 best results (q) qualified for the final.

| Rank | Group | Name | Nationality | #1 | #2 | #3 | Results | Notes |
|---|---|---|---|---|---|---|---|---|
| 1 | A | Ioannis Kiriazis | Greece | 78.43 | | | 78.43 | Q |
| 2 | A | Alexandru Novac | Romania | 71.67 | 73.07 | 77.00 | 77.00 | Q |
| 3 | A | Andrian Mardare | Moldova | 71.22 | 72.46 | 76.09 | 76.09 | Q |
| 4 | B | Edis Matusevičius | Lithuania | 75.54 | | | 75.54 | Q |
| 5 | B | Norbert Rivasz-Tóth | Hungary | 74.99 | | | 74.99 | Q |
| 6 | A | Gatis Čakšs | Latvia | 68.60 | 74.70 | | 74.70 | Q |
| 7 | B | Oliver Helander | Finland | x | x | 73.13 | 73.13 | q |
| 8 | B | Emin Öncel | Turkey | x | 72.69 | 71.06 | 72.69 | q |
| 9 | A | Jonas Bonewit | Germany | 72.39 | x | 69.10 | 72.39 | q |
| 10 | B | Valery Izotau | Belarus | 70.92 | 72.14 | 69.14 | 72.14 | q |
| 11 | B | Sindri Hrafn Guðmundsson | Iceland | 71.38 | x | 72.05 | 72.05 | q |
| 12 | A | Nicolás Quijera | Spain | x | 71.30 | 71.48 | 71.48 | q |
| 13 | A | Mikalai Klimuk | Belarus | x | 69.41 | x | 69.41 | |
| 14 | A | Bartul Bašić | Croatia | 69.32 | 60.82 | 68.33 | 69.32 | |
| 15 | B | Odei Jainaga | Spain | 69.07 | 67.40 | x | 69.07 | |
| 16 | B | George Cătălin Zaharia | Romania | x | 68.92 | 65.60 | 68.92 | |
| 17 | A | Dagbjartur Dadi Jónsson | Iceland | x | 68.41 | x | 68.41 | |
| 18 | A | Oleksandr Kozubskyy | Ukraine | 65.61 | x | 67.24 | 67.24 | |
| 19 | B | Héctor Aragüés | Spain | 66.43 | x | 64.06 | 66.43 | |
| 20 | B | Matviy Krutiyenko | Ukraine | x | 65.64 | x | 65.64 | |
| 21 | B | Muhammet Mavis | Turkey | x | x | 62.74 | 62.74 | |
| 22 | B | Roberto Orlando | Italy | 60.24 | 60.20 | 59.83 | 60.24 | |
| 23 | A | Ahmet Talha Kılıç | Turkey | x | 59.34 | x | 59.34 | |
| 24 | A | Giovanni Bellini | Italy | x | 57.29 | x | 57.29 | |
| | A | Jami Kinnunen | Finland | x | x | x | NM | |
| | B | Maximilián Slezák | Slovakia | x | x | x | NM | |

=== Final ===
15 July

| Rank | Name | Nationality | #1 | #2 | #3 | #4 | #5 | #6 | Result | Notes |
|---|---|---|---|---|---|---|---|---|---|---|
| 1st place, gold medalist(s) | Norbert Rivasz-Tóth | Hungary | 77.88 | 83.08 | x | x | 75.82 | x | 83.08 | NR |
| 2nd place, silver medalist(s) | Ioannis Kiriazis | Greece | 64.93 | 71.04 | 79.91 | 76.64 | 80.96 | 81.04 | 81.04 | |
| 3rd place, bronze medalist(s) | Andrian Mardare | Moldova | 78.76 | 76.31 | 76.25 | x | x | 77.28 | 78.76 | |
| 4 | Alexandru Novac | Romania | 77.76 | 77.20 | 77.07 | x | x | x | 77.76 | |
| 5 | Edis Matusevičius | Lithuania | 75.30 | 76.29 | 76.82 | x | x | 73.89 | 76.82 | |
| 6 | Emin Öncel | Turkey | 76.54 | x | x | 73.65 | 72.97 | 72.58 | 76.54 | |
| 7 | Oliver Helander | Finland | 74.46 | x | 73.71 | x | x | x | 74.46 | |
| 8 | Gatis Čakšs | Latvia | 72.69 | 74.44 | 73.76 | x | x | 72.48 | 74.44 | |
| 9 | Sindri Hrafn Guðmundsson | Iceland | 71.84 | 68.09 | 74.42 | | | | 74.42 | |
| 10 | Jonas Bonewit | Germany | 67.59 | 66.58 | 73.24 | | | | 73.24 | |
| 11 | Valery Izotau | Belarus | 64.17 | 70.03 | 73.14 | | | | 73.14 | |
| 12 | Nicolás Quijera | Spain | 69.59 | 68.51 | x | | | | 69.59 | |
