= 2023 World Athletics Championships – Men's javelin throw =

Sports event

Men's javelin throw at the 2023 World Championships
- Venue: National Athletics Centre
- Dates: 25 August (qualification); 27 August (final)
- Competitors: 37 from 25 nations
- Winning distance: 88.17

Medalists
gold medal	Neeraj Chopra	India
silver medal	Arshad Nadeem	Pakistan
bronze medal	Jakub Vadlejch	Czech Republic

The men's javelin throw at the 2023 World Athletics Championships was held at the National Athletics Centre in Budapest on 25 and 27 August 2023.

== Summary ==
After winning two successive championships Anderson Peters was involved in an incident where he ended up being beaten and badly injured by 5 crew members of a party boat. Peters was able to return, but threw 78.49m in the preliminary round and didn't make the final. Across two previous competitions, only one of his throws had ever been less than 80m, three throws were over 90m. Jakub Vadlejch, the returning bronze medalist, came into the competition as the world leader for 2023 and the returning silver medalist, Tokyo Olympic Champion Neeraj Chopra were top qualifiers to the final.

Oliver Helander started things off with 83.38m, Vadlejch followed him with 82.59m. The first two throws of the competition would prove to be the first round leaders. Ihab Abdelrahman came out of the round in third place at 80.64m. Now that everybody was warmed up, the real throwing can begin in the second round. Vadlejch improved to 84.18m. Two throwers later, Chopra launched 88.17 m (289 ft 3 in). He knew it was good, he turned to the crowd to celebrate and didn't even watch if fly. Near the end of the round Julian Weber tossed 85.79m to take over the second position. In the third round, Arshad Nadeem hit an 87.82m to put a scare into Chopra's lead. Nadeem's fourth round throw was also in the 87 metre range. In the fifth round, Vadlejch threw 86.67m to move into bronze position.

Chopra's win was the first Gold Medal at the World Championships for India. He was not alone as two other Indian competitors, Kishore Jena and D. P. Manu finished in fifth and sixth. Nadeem was the first ever medal for neighboring Pakistan. Even though the two countries have been sabre-rattling since their inception, the two men shared a congratulatory hug.

== Records ==
Before the competition records were as follows:

Record	Athlete & Nat.	Perf.	Location	Date
World record	Jan Železný (CZE)	98.48 m	Jena, Germany	25 May 1996
Championship record	Jan Železný (CZE)	92.80 m	Edmonton, Canada	12 August 2001
World Leading	Jakub Vadlejch (CZE)	89.51 m	Turku, Finland	13 June 2023
African Record	Julius Yego (KEN)	92.72 m	Beijing, China	26 August 2015
Asian Record	Cheng Chao-tsun (TPE)	91.36 m	Taipei City, Taipei	26 August 2017
North, Central American and Caribbean record	Anderson Peters (GRN)	93.07 m	Doha, Qatar	13 May 2022
South American Record	Edgar Baumann (PAR)	84.70 m	San Marcos, United States	17 October 1999
European Record	Jan Železný (CZE)	98.48 m	Jena, Germany	25 May 1996
Oceanian record	Jarrod Bannister (AUS)	89.02 m	Brisbane, Australia	29 February 2008

== Qualification standard ==
The standard to qualify automatically for entry was 85.20 m.

== Schedule ==
The event schedule, in local time (UTC+2), was as follows:

Date	Time	Round
25 August	10:10	Qualification
27 August	20:15	Final

== Results ==
=== Qualification ===
Qualification: Qualifying distance 83.00 (Q) or the 12 best athletes including ties (q) qualify to the final.

Rank	Group	Name	Nationality	Round			Mark	Notes
Rank	Group	Name	Nationality	1	2	3	Mark	Notes
1	A	Neeraj Chopra	India	88.77			88.77	Q, SB
2	B	Arshad Nadeem	Pakistan	70.63	81.53	86.79	86.79	Q, SB
3	B	Jakub Vadlejch	Czech Republic	81.34	83.50		83.50	Q
4	A	Julian Weber	Germany	81.05	82.39	80.83	82.39	q
5	B	Edis Matusevičius	Lithuania	78.44	82.35	-	82.35	q
6	A	D.P. Manu	India	78.10	81.31	72.40	81.31	q
7	A	Dawid Wegner	Poland	76.50	81.25	75.74	81.25	q
8	B	Ihab Abdelrahman	Egypt	80.75	x	x	80.75	q
9	B	Kishore Jena	India	80.55	78.07	x	80.55	q
10	B	Oliver Helander	Finland	x	80.19	x	80.19	q
11	B	Timothy Herman	Belgium	73.00	80.11	-	80.11	q
12	B	Andrian Mardare	Moldova	79.78	77.27	79.00	79.78	q
13	A	Toni Kuusela	Finland	79.27	x	x	79.27	
14	A	Genki Dean	Japan	78.21	78.57	79.21	79.21	
15	B	Cyprian Mrzygłód	Poland	78.28	78.49	77.35	78.49	
16	A	Anderson Peters	Grenada	78.02	77.51	78.49	78.49	
17	A	Julius Yego	Kenya	x	78.42	76.68	78.42	
18	B	Lassi Etelätalo	Finland	76.89	78.19	x	78.19	
19	B	Cameron McEntyre	Australia	x	75.44	78.10	78.10	
20	B	Luiz Mauricio da Silva	Brazil	68.25	77.70	74.17	77.70	
21	A	Patriks Gailums	Latvia	77.20	77.43	x	77.43	
22	A	Kenji Ogura	Japan	76.65	x	75.70	76.65	
23	B	György Herczeg	Hungary	72.31	76.18	x	76.18	
24	A	Capers Williamson	United States	76.10	x	x	76.10	
25	B	Alexandru Novac	Romania	75.75	74.61	74.67	75.75	
26	B	Jakob Samuelsson	Sweden	73.81	x	75.50	75.50	
27	A	Douw Smit	South Africa	64.29	75.03	71.21	75.03	
28	A	Felise Vaha'i Sosaia	France	68.23	74.80	x	74.80	
29	B	Rolands Štrobinders	Latvia	74.46	73.98	x	74.46	
30	A	Curtis Thompson	United States	72.46	72.99	74.21	74.21	
31	A	Leandro Ramos	Portugal	66.02	74.03	73.55	74.03	
32	B	Artur Felfner	Ukraine	x	x	73.81	73.81	
33	A	Gatis Čakšs	Latvia	x	72.34	73.42	73.42	
34	A	Pedro Henrique Rodrigues	Brazil	x	67.11	72.34	72.34	
–	B	Ethan Dabbs	United States	x	x	x	NM	
–	B	Yuta Sakiyama	Japan	x	x	x	NM	
–	A	Keshorn Walcott	Trinidad and Tobago				DNS	

=== Final ===
The final started on 27 August at 20:16.

Rank	Name	Nationality	Round						Mark	Notes
Rank	Name	Nationality	1	2	3	4	5	6	Mark	Notes
1st place, gold medalist(s)	Neeraj Chopra	India	X	88.17	86.32	84.64	87.73	83.96	88.17	
2nd place, silver medalist(s)	Arshad Nadeem	Pakistan	74.80	82.81	87.82	87.15	X	81.86	87.82	SB
3rd place, bronze medalist(s)	Jakub Vadlejch	Czech Republic	82.59	84.18	83.65	83.62	86.67	X	86.67	
4	Julian Weber	Germany	80.43	85.79	76.86	82.55	82.81	79.01	85.79	
5	Kishore Jena	India	75.70	82.82	x	80.19	84.77	x	84.77	PB
6	D. P. Manu	India	78.44	X	83.72	X	83.48	84.14	84.14	
7	Oliver Helander	Finland	83.38	81.44	X	X	X	82.85	83.38	
8	Edis Matusevičius	Lithuania	75.13	80.42	82.29	79.17	x	77.53	82.29	
9	Dawid Wegner	Poland	78.19	74.60	80.75				80.75	
10	Ihab Abdelrahman	Egypt	80.64	78.94	X				80.64	
11	Andrian Mardare	Moldova	79.66	79.24	79.49				79.66	
12	Timothy Herman	Belgium	72.17	74.56	X				74.56	
