= 2024 European Athletics Championships – Men's javelin throw =

Men's javelin throw at the 2024 European Athletics Championships
- Venue: Stadio Olimpico
- Location: Rome
- Dates: 11 June (qualification); 12 June (final)
- Competitors: 30 from 19 nations
- Winning distance: 88.65 m

Medalists
gold medal	Jakub Vadlejch	Czech Republic
silver medal	Julian Weber	Germany
bronze medal	Oliver Helander	Finland

The men's javelin throw at the 2024 European Athletics Championships took place at the Stadio Olimpico on 11 and 12 June.

== Records ==
Standing records prior to the 2024 European Athletics Championships
World record	Jan Železný (CZE)	98.48 m	Jena, Germany	25 May 1996
European record	Jan Železný (CZE)	98.48 m	Jena, Germany	25 May 1996
Championship record	Steve Backley (GBR)	89.72 m	Budapest, Hungary	23 August 1998
World Leading	Max Dehning (GER)	90.20 m	Halle, Germany	25 February 2024
Europe Leading	Max Dehning (GER)	90.20 m	Halle, Germany	25 February 2024

== Schedule ==
Date	Time	Round
11 June 2024	13:00	Qualification
12 June 2024	20:28	Final

All times are local times (UTC+2)

== Results ==
=== Qualification ===
Qualification: 82.00 m (Q) or best 12 performers (q).

Rank	Group	Name	Nationality	#1	#2	#3	Result	Note
1	B	Julian Weber	Germany	78.76	80.18	85.01	85.01	Q
2	A	Edis Matusevičius	Lithuania	78.88	79.60	84.82	84.82	Q
3	A	Oliver Helander	Finland	84.35			84.35	Q
4	B	Jakub Vadlejch	Czech Republic	83.36			83.36	Q
5	B	Toni Keränen	Finland	76.64	82.77		82.77	Q, SB
6	A	Patriks Gailums	Latvia	73.77	x	82.39	82.39	Q, SB
7	A	Andrian Mardare	Moldova	78.59	78.49	82.18	82.18	Q, SB
8	B	Artur Felfner	Ukraine	81.74	–	–	81.74	q
9	B	Marcin Krukowski	Poland	81.72	–	–	81.72	q
10	A	Teuraiterai Tupaia	France	80.63	79.29	81.46	81.46	q
11	B	Lassi Etelätalo	Finland	80.56	78.12	80.83	80.83	q
12	A	Max Dehning	Germany	74.13	80.52	77.52	80.52	q
13	A	Dawid Wegner	Poland	72.61	79.35	76.98	79.35	
14	B	Gatis Čakšs	Latvia	75.24	x	79.22	79.22	
15	A	Leandro Ramos	Portugal	x	79.17	74.64	79.17	
16	B	Cyprian Mrzygłód	Poland	77.93	77.87	x	77.93	
17	B	Alexandru Novac	Romania	77.57	x	73.92	77.57	
18	A	Ioannis Kyriazis	Greece	77.54	73.96	x	77.54	
19	A	Timothy Herman	Belgium	77.03	77.35	74.36	77.35	
20	B	Sindri Hrafn Guðmundsson	Iceland	77.30	75.93	x	77.30	
21	A	Manu Quijera	Spain	x	75.38	75.61	75.61	
22	A	Kasper Sagen	Norway	74.50	x	72.89	74.50	
23	B	Jakub Kubínec	Slovakia	72.16	69.00	x	72.16	
24	A	Norbert Rivasz-Tóth	Hungary	71.32	69.80	x	71.32	
25	B	Arthur W. Petersen	Denmark	x	71.20	x	71.20	
26	A	Dagbjartur Daði Jónsson	Iceland	70.44	x	68.09	70.44	
27	B	György Herczeg	Hungary	x	x	65.00	65.00	
	A	Jaroslav Jílek	Czech Republic	x	x	x	NM	
	B	Martin Konečný	Czech Republic	x	x	x	NM	
	B	Rolands Štrobinders	Latvia	x	x	x	NM	

=== Final ===
The final started on 12 June at 20:28.

Rank	Name	Nationality	#1	#2	#3	#4	#5	#6	Result	Note
1st place, gold medalist(s)	Jakub Vadlejch	Czech Republic	81.26	79.44	84.66	83.40	79.47	88.65	88.65	SB
2nd place, silver medalist(s)	Julian Weber	Germany	85.94	80.12	82.21	82.43	80.80	84.62	85.94	
3rd place, bronze medalist(s)	Oliver Helander	Finland	77.65	x	85.75	x	–	x	85.75	SB
4	Edis Matusevičius	Lithuania	79.54	80.12	82.81	82.76	83.96	77.35	83.96	
5	Teuraiterai Tupaia	France	82.98	–	–	r			82.98	
6	Lassi Etelätalo	Finland	78.09	78.56	82.80	–	x	x	82.80	SB
7	Patriks Gailums	Latvia	78.11	75.90	82.28	x	76.23	x	82.28	
8	Artur Felfner	Ukraine	81.38	x	x	x	x	x	81.38	
9	Marcin Krukowski	Poland	80.06	81.24	79.48				81.24	
10	Toni Keränen	Finland	78.41	76.69	80.76				80.76	
11	Andrian Mardare	Moldova	80.22	79.01	x				80.22	
12	Max Dehning	Germany	75.66	74.68	76.16				76.16	
