= 2022 European Athletics Championships – Men's javelin throw =

Men's Javelin throw at the 2022 European Athletics Championships
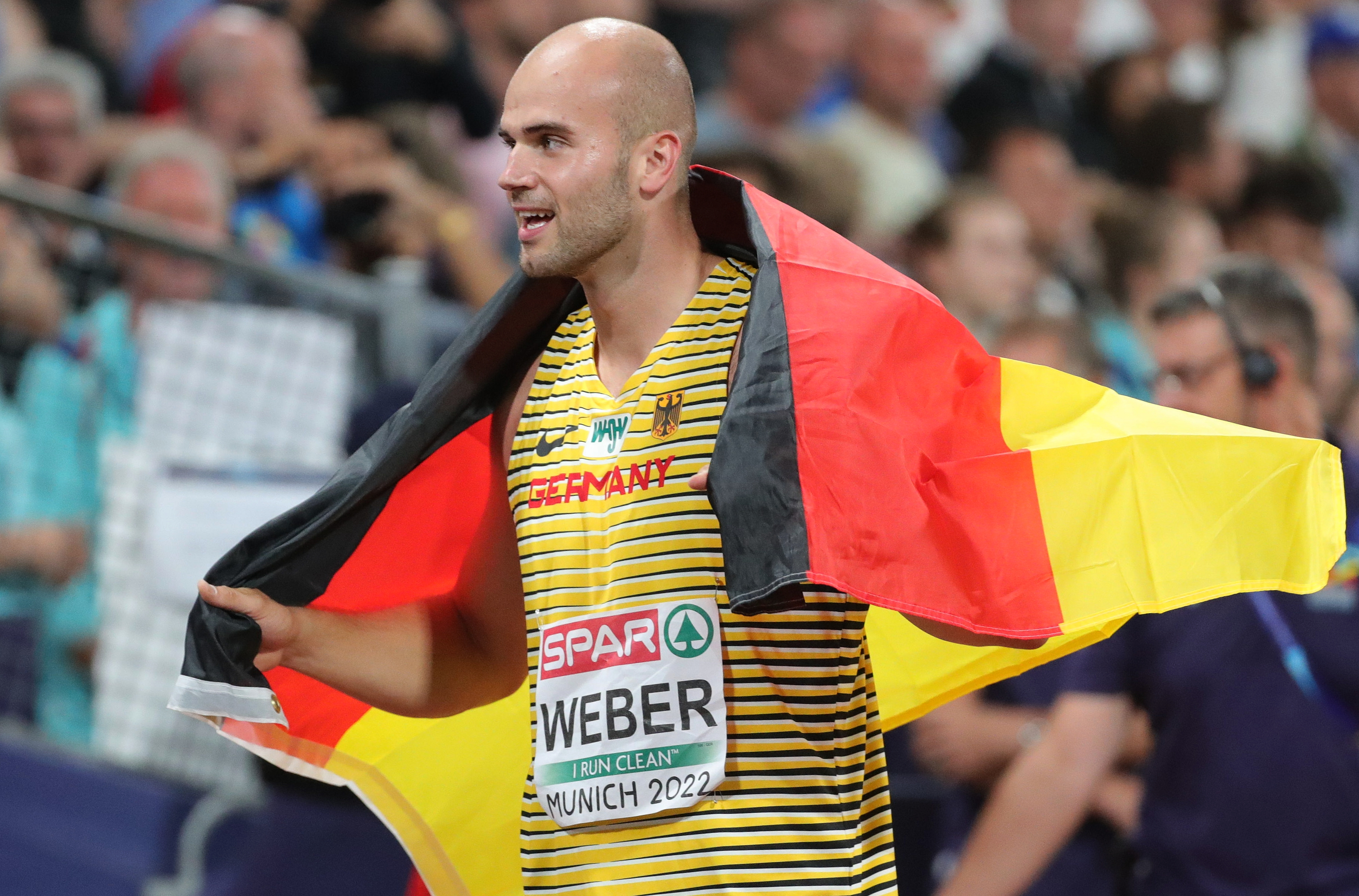
- Julian Weber shortly after winning the event.
- Venue: Olympiastadion
- Location: Munich
- Dates: August 19 (qualification); August 21 (final)
- Competitors: 24 from 15 nations
- Winning distance: 87.66

Medalists
| gold medal | Julian Weber | Germany |
| silver medal | Jakub Vadlejch | Czech Republic |
| bronze medal | Lassi Etelätalo | Finland |

The men's javelin throw at the 2022 European Athletics Championships took place at the Olympiastadion on 19 and 21 August.

== Records ==
Standing records prior to the 2022 European Athletics Championships
| World record | Jan Železný (CZE) | 98.48 m | Jena, Germany | 25 May 1996 |
| European record | Jan Železný (CZE) | 98.48 m | Jena, Germany | 25 May 1996 |
| Championship record | Steve Backley (GBR) | 89.72 m | Budapest, Hungary | 23 August 1998 |
| World Leading | Anderson Peters (GRN) | 93.07 m | Doha, Qatar | 13 May 2022 |
| Europe Leading | Jakub Vadlejch (CZE) | 90.88 m | Doha, Qatar | 13 May 2022 |

== Schedule ==
| Date | Time | Round |
|---|---|---|
| 19 August 2022 | 10:00 | Qualification |
| 21 August 2022 | 19:50 | Final |

All times are local times (UTC+2)

== Results ==
=== Qualification ===
Qualification: 83.50 m (Q) or best 12 performers (q)

| Rank | Group | Name | Nationality | #1 | #2 | #3 | Result | Note |
|---|---|---|---|---|---|---|---|---|
| 1 | B | Jakub Vadlejch | Czech Republic | x | 81.81 | – | 81.81 | q |
| 2 | B | Julian Weber | Germany | 80.99 | 73.27 | x | 80.99 | q |
| 3 | B | Lassi Etelätalo | Finland | 79.29 | – | – | 79.29 | q |
| 4 | A | Vítězslav Veselý | Czech Republic | 79.27 | – | – | 79.27 | q |
| 5 | A | Toni Kuusela | Finland | 78.80 | 79.26 | – | 79.26 | q |
| 6 | B | Andrian Mardare | Moldova | 75.13 | x | 78.78 | 78.78 | q |
| 7 | B | Alexandru Novac | Romania | 77.68 | x | 75.13 | 77.68 | q |
| 8 | A | Patriks Gailums | Latvia | 77.55 | x | 77.02 | 77.55 | q |
| 9 | A | Martin Konečný | Czech Republic | 72.01 | 77.49 | x | 77.49 | q |
| 10 | A | Rolands Štrobinders | Latvia | 77.33 | x | 75.54 | 77.33 | q |
| 11 | B | Andreas Hofmann | Germany | x | 77.29 | x | 77.29 | q |
| 12 | B | Timothy Herman | Belgium | 77.20 | x | – | 77.20 | q |
| 13 | B | Toni Keränen | Finland | 77.01 | 76.63 | 74.62 | 77.01 | |
| 14 | A | Manu Quijera | Spain | 76.67 | 74.23 | 76.51 | 76.67 | |
| 15 | A | Artur Felfner | Ukraine | x | 76.06 | x | 76.06 | |
| 16 | B | Felise Vaha'i Sosaia | France | 74.70 | 72.35 | 70.22 | 74.70 | |
| 17 | B | Gatis Čakšs | Latvia | x | 74.63 | x | 74.63 | |
| 18 | A | Denis Adrian Both | Romania | 74.62 | 73.14 | 73.48 | 74.62 | |
| 19 | A | Roberto Orlando | Italy | 71.82 | 73.59 | 69.94 | 73.59 | |
| 20 | A | Leandro Ramos | Portugal | 69.39 | 72.46 | 72.90 | 72.90 | |
| 21 | A | Arthur Wiborg Petersen | Denmark | x | 71.51 | 72.82 | 72.82 | |
| 22 | A | Thomas Röhler | Germany | 70.66 | 71.31 | x | 71.31 | |
| 23 | B | Jakob Samuelsson | Sweden | x | x | 70.39 | 70.39 | |
| 24 | B | Emin Öncel | Turkey | 68.97 | x | 67.15 | 68.97 | |

=== Final ===
| Rank | Name | Nationality | #1 | #2 | #3 | #4 | #5 | #6 | Result | Note |
|---|---|---|---|---|---|---|---|---|---|---|
| 1st place, gold medalist(s) | Julian Weber | Germany | 83.05 | x | 77.01 | 87.66 | 83.33 | – | 87.66 | |
| 2nd place, silver medalist(s) | Jakub Vadlejch | Czech Republic | x | 87.28 | 84.03 | x | x | x | 87.28 | |
| 3rd place, bronze medalist(s) | Lassi Etelätalo | Finland | 81.84 | 82.93 | x | x | 86.44 | x | 86.44 | PB |
| 4 | Vítězslav Veselý | Czech Republic | x | 76.76 | x | 80.21 | 84.36 | 80.53 | 84.36 | |
| 5 | Toni Kuusela | Finland | 78.89 | x | 79.66 | x | 80.20 | – | 80.20 | |
| 6 | Patriks Gailums | Latvia | 70.41 | x | 78.82 | x | 77.00 | x | 78.82 | |
| 7 | Andrian Mardare | Moldova | 76.63 | 77.49 | 76.22 | x | x | x | 77.49 | |
| 8 | Rolands Štrobinders | Latvia | 74.29 | x | 76.16 | 77.10 | x | x | 77.10 | |
| 9 | Alexandru Novac | Romania | 75.78 | x | 73.84 | | | | 75.78 | |
| 10 | Timothy Herman | Belgium | 74.84 | 72.90 | 72.76 | | | | 74.84 | |
| 11 | Andreas Hofmann | Germany | 74.75 | 74.42 | x | | | | 74.75 | |
| 12 | Martin Konečný | Czech Republic | x | 73.48 | x | | | | 73.48 | |
