= 2018 European Athletics Championships – Men's javelin throw =

Men's javelin throw at the 2018 European Athletics Championships
- Venue: Olympic Stadium
- Location: Berlin
- Dates: 7 August (qualification); 9 August (final)
- Competitors: 28 from 18 nations
- Winning distance: 89.47

Medalists
gold medal	Thomas Röhler	Germany
silver medal	Andreas Hofmann	Germany
bronze medal	Magnus Kirt	Estonia

The men's javelin throw at the 2018 European Athletics Championships took place at the Olympic Stadium on 8 and 9 August.

== Records ==
Standing records prior to the 2018 European Athletics Championships
World record	Jan Železný (CZE)	98.48 m	Jena, Germany	25 May 1996
European record	Jan Železný (CZE)	98.48 m	Jena, Germany	25 May 1996
Championship record	Steve Backley (GBR)	89.72 m	Budapest, Hungary	23 August 1998
World Leading	Johannes Vetter (GER)	92.70 m	Leiria, Portugal	11 March 2018
European Leading	Johannes Vetter (GER)	92.70 m	Leiria, Portugal	11 March 2018

== Schedule ==
Date	Time	Round
8 August 2018	13:00	Qualification
9 August 2018	20:22	Final

All times are local times (UTC+2)

== Results ==
=== Qualification ===
Qualification: 82.00 m (Q) or best 12 performers (q)

Rank	Group	Name	Nationality	#1	#2	#3	Result	Note
1	B	Johannes Vetter	Germany	87.39			87.39	Q
2	B	Thomas Röhler	Germany	x	78.95	85.47	85.47	Q
3	A	Marcin Krukowski	Poland	84.35			84.35	Q, SB
4	B	Cyprian Mrzygłód	Poland	80.52	83.85		83.85	Q, PB
5	B	Magnus Kirt	Estonia	83.15			83.15	Q
6	A	Andreas Hofmann	Germany	82.36			82.36	Q
7	A	Rolands Štrobinders	Latvia	76.00	81.93	78.07	81.93	q
8	A	Edis Matusevičius	Lithuania	79.45	79.49	81.08	81.08	q
9	B	Andrian Mardare	Moldova	78.63	80.46	80.31	80.46	q
10	B	Jakub Vadlejch	Czech Republic	x	80.28	x	80.28	q
11	A	Antti Ruuskanen	Finland	x	77.40	79.93	79.93	q
12	A	Petr Frydrych	Czech Republic	77.02	74.55	79.74	79.74	q
13	A	Gatis Čakšs	Latvia	78.13	x	75.94	78.13	
14	B	Patriks Gailums	Latvia	78.10	x	75.79	78.10	SB
15	A	Tanel Laanmäe	Estonia	77.21	x	x	77.21	
16	B	Oliver Helander	Finland	x	x	76.64	76.64	
17	A	Alexandru Novac	Romania	72.81	x	76.44	76.44	
18	A	Vedran Samac	Serbia	x	75.89	75.67	75.89	
19	B	Jaroslav Jílek	Czech Republic	75.83	75.80	73.06	75.83	
20	B	Sindri Hrafn Guðmundsson	Iceland	72.40	74.91	74.13	74.91	
21	B	Bartosz Osewski	Poland	73.56	73.37	74.80	74.80	
22	A	Yuriy Kushniruk	Ukraine	72.17	71.36	73.79	73.79	
23	B	Pavel Mialeshka	Belarus	73.55	x	x	73.55	
24	A	Nicolás Quijera	Spain	73.27	x	71.04	73.27	
25	B	Jiannis Smalios	Sweden	x	68.61	72.09	72.09	
26	A	Roberto Bertolini	Italy	71.94	71.64	x	71.94	
27	B	Norbert Rivasz-Tóth	Hungary	x	x	69.94	69.94	
28	A	Dejan Mileusnić	Bosnia and Herzegovina	67.16	x	x	67.16	

=== Final ===
Rank	Athlete	Nationality	#1	#2	#3	#4	#5	#6	Result	Notes
1st place, gold medalist(s)	Thomas Röhler	Germany	x	88.02	89.47	87.58	–	87.90	89.47	
2nd place, silver medalist(s)	Andreas Hofmann	Germany	85.61	87.60	x	x	x	85.48	87.60	
3rd place, bronze medalist(s)	Magnus Kirt	Estonia	85.96	x	82.84	81.67	82.46	84.81	85.96	
4	Marcin Krukowski	Poland	77.83	76.04	84.55	83.28	82.84	x	84.55	SB
5	Johannes Vetter	Germany	x	82.59	81.51	x	83.27	80.01	83.27	
6	Antti Ruuskanen	Finland	80.13	x	80.38	x	81.70	x	81.70	
7	Andrian Mardare	Moldova	81.54	x	80.41	x	80.33	x	81.54	
8	Jakub Vadlejch	Czech Republic	80.64	x	x	x	x	x	80.64	
9	Cyprian Mrzygłód	Poland	76.97	78.21	80.20				80.20	
10	Edis Matusevičius	Lithuania	77.64	76.66	x				77.64	
11	Rolands Štrobinders	Latvia	75.76	76.59	x				76.59	
12	Petr Frydrych	Czech Republic	72.79	x	x				72.79	
