= Gatis Čakšs =

Latvian javelin thrower

Personal information
- Born: 13 June 1995 (age 31) Līvāni, Latvia

Sport
- Sport: Athletics
- Event: Javelin throw

Gatis Čakšs (born 13 June 1995 in Līvāni) is a Latvian athlete specialising in the javelin throw. He has competed at multiple major championships, including the 2024 Paris Olympics. He won the gold medal at the 2014 World Junior Championships.

== Career ==
He won the gold medal at the 2014 World Junior Championships in Eugene, Oregon with a throw of 75.04 metres to win from Slovenian Matija Muhar, by over a metre. He made his Diamond League debut in 2018 in Birmingham, England, and finished in sixth place with a best throw of 80.96 metres.

In 2019, he became National senior champion at the Latvian Athletics Championships with a throw of 84.04 metres. In August 2020, he retained his national championship title at the Latvian Athletics Championships with a throw of 83.80 metres. In June 2021, he won the Latvian national title for a third time at the Latvian Athletics Championships, with a throw of 81.96 metres. In June 2021, he moved to second on the Latvian all-time list by winning in Eisenstadt, Austria, with a throw of 87.57 metres. He competed at the 2020 Olympic Games in Tokyo in 2021, but did not progress to the final with a best throw of 78.73 metres.

In 2022, he took part in the 2022 European Athletics Championships in Munich. He was selected for the 2023 World Athletics Championships in Budapest in August 2023, but did not make the final.

In June 2024, he competed at the 2024 European Athletics Championships in Rome. He threw 79.42 metres in qualifying but did not proceed through to the final. He competed in the javelin at the 2024 Summer Olympics in Paris in August 2024, but failed to record a throw.

== International competitions ==
Year	Competition	Venue	Position	Event	Notes
Representing Latvia
2011	World Youth Championships	Lille, France	8th	Javelin throw (700 g)	66.94 m
2011	European Youth Olympic Festival	Trabzon, Turkey	6th	Javelin throw (700 g)	69.15 m
2013	European Junior Championships	Rieti, Italy	12th	Javelin throw	63.90 m
2014	World Junior Championships	Eugene, United States	1st	Javelin throw	74.04 m
2015	European U23 Championships	Tallinn, Estonia	10th	Javelin throw	72.48 m
2017	European U23 Championships	Bydgoszcz, Poland	8th	Javelin throw	74.44 m
2018	European Championships	Berlin, Germany	13th (q)	Javelin throw	78.13 m
2019	World Championships	Doha, Qatar	21st (q)	Javelin throw	79.94 m
2021	Olympic Games	Tokyo, Japan	18th (q)	Javelin throw	78.73 m
2022	European Championships	Munich, Germany	17th (q)	Javelin throw	74.63 m
2023	World Championships	Budapest, Hungary	33rd (q)	Javelin throw	73.42 m
2024	European Championships	Rome, Italy	14th (q)	Javelin throw	79.22 m
2024	Olympic Games	Paris, France	–	Javelin throw	NM
