= 2019 World Athletics Championships – Men's javelin throw =

Men's javelin throw at the 2019 World Championships
- Venue: Khalifa International Stadium
- Dates: 5 October (qualification); 6 October (final)
- Competitors: 31 from 22 nations
- Winning distance: 86.89

Medalists
gold medal	Anderson Peters	Grenada
silver medal	Magnus Kirt	Estonia
bronze medal	Johannes Vetter	Germany

The men's javelin throw at the 2019 World Athletics Championships was held at the Khalifa International Stadium in Doha, Qatar, on 5 and 6 October 2019.

== Summary ==
The automatic qualification to the final was 84.00 metres. One and done, on his first throw Johannes Vetter beat that by over 5 metres with an 89.35m. In the second group, world leader Magnus Kirt took two attempts to make his mark of 88.36m. Either of those throws would have won the final easily.

In the final, only four men got over 80 metres in the first round, Anderson Peters took the lead with 86.69 m (284 ft 4 3/4 in). In the second round, Vetter and Kirt got respectable marks with 85.37m and 86.21m respectively. From that point, nobody would improve. Fourth place Lassi Etelätalo was almost 3 metres off the podium. In the fourth round, Peters duplicated his winning first round throw with another 86.69m. #8 in the world rankings coming in, Peters took gold.

== Records ==
Before the competition records were as follows:

Record	Perf.	Athlete	Nat.	Date	Location
World	98.48	Jan Železný	CZE	25 May 1996	Jena, Germany
Championship	92.80	Jan Železný	CZE	12 Aug 2001	Edmonton, Canada
World leading	90.61	Magnus Kirt	EST	22 Jun 2019	Kuortane, Finland
African	92.72	Julius Yego	KEN	26 Aug 2015	Beijing, China
Asian	91.36	Cheng Chao-tsun	TPE	26 Aug 2017	Taipei, Chinese Taipei
NACAC	91.29	Breaux Greer	USA	21 Jun 2007	Indianapolis, United States
South American	84.70	Edgar Baumann	PAR	17 Oct 1999	San Marcos, United States
European	98.48	Jan Železný	CZE	25 May 1996	Jena, Germany
Oceanian	89.02	Jarrod Bannister	AUS	29 Feb 2008	Brisbane, Australia

== Schedule ==
The event schedule, in local time (UTC+3), is as follows:

Date	Time	Round
5 October	16:30	Qualification
6 October	19:55	Final

== Results ==
=== Qualification ===
Qualification: Qualifying Performance 84.00 (Q) or at least 12 best performers (q) advanced to the final.

Rank	Group	Name	Nationality	Round			Mark	Notes
Rank	Group	Name	Nationality	1	2	3	Mark	Notes
1	A	Johannes Vetter	Germany	89.35			89.35	Q
2	B	Magnus Kirt	Estonia	81.00	88.36		88.36	Q
3	A	Anderson Peters	Grenada	82.06	85.34		85.34	Q
4	B	Kim Amb	Sweden	x	82.98	84.85	84.85	Q
5	B	Keshorn Walcott	Trinidad and Tobago	84.44			84.44	Q
6	A	Jakub Vadlejch	Czech Republic	81.70	84.31		84.31	Q
7	A	Julian Weber	Germany	84.29			84.29	Q
8	A	Julius Yego	Kenya	83.86	83.76	80.62	83.86	q
9	A	Norbert Rivasz-Tóth	Hungary	83.42	81.06	77.27	83.42	q, NR
10	B	Cheng Chao-tsun	Chinese Taipei	79.08	83.40	79.88	83.40	q
11	A	Marcin Krukowski	Poland	82.44	x	82.02	82.44	q
12	B	Lassi Etelätalo	Finland	75.11	x	82.26	82.26	q
13	B	Alexandru Novac	Romania	82.12	78.18	79.75	82.12	
14	B	Aliaksei Katkavets	Belarus	75.88	x	82.08	82.08	
15	B	Ryohei Arai	Japan	81.71	x	72.99	81.71	
16	B	Arshad Nadeem	Pakistan	81.52	75.48	x	81.52	NR
17	B	Rolands Štrobinders	Latvia	81.09	80.60	79.51	81.09	
18	B	Michael Shuey	United States	77.04	x	80.53	80.53	
19	B	Oliver Helander	Finland	x	80.36	x	80.36	
20	B	Andreas Hofmann	Germany	80.06	x	x	80.06	
21	A	Gatis Čakšs	Latvia	79.94	x	79.63	79.94	
22	A	Edis Matusevičius	Lithuania	73.98	75.73	79.60	79.60	
23	B	Thomas Röhler	Germany	x	79.23	x	79.23	
24	A	Shivpal Singh	India	75.91	78.97	x	78.97	
25	A	Liu Qizhen	China	75.24	x	75.81	75.81	
26	A	Riley Dolezal	United States	75.62	x	74.85	75.62	
27	A	Pavel Mialeshka	Belarus	x	75.14	x	75.14	
28	A	Antti Ruuskanen	Finland	72.65	75.05	x	75.05	
29	A	Albert Reynolds	Saint Lucia	69.68	73.91	x	73.91	
30	A	Oleksandr Nychyporchuk	Ukraine	x	72.75	x	72.75	
	B	Zhao Qinggang	China	x	x	x	NM	
	B	Vítězslav Veselý	Czech Republic				DNS	

=== Final ===
The final was started on 6 October at 19:57.

Rank	Name	Nationality	Round						Mark	Notes
Rank	Name	Nationality	1	2	3	4	5	6	Mark	Notes
1st place, gold medalist(s)	Anderson Peters	Grenada	86.69	81.26	79.82	86.89	84.59	83.63	86.89	
2nd place, silver medalist(s)	Magnus Kirt	Estonia	83.95	86.21	85.17	85.90	x	r	86.21	
3rd place, bronze medalist(s)	Johannes Vetter	Germany	x	85.37	82.51	x	82.29	x	85.37	
4	Lassi Etelätalo	Finland	72.00	77.92	82.49	74.62	x	74.63	82.49	
5	Jakub Vadlejch	Czech Republic	77.32	81.98	82.19	77.36	x	x	82.19	
6	Julian Weber	Germany	81.20	81.26	80.80	79.43	79.46	73.58	81.26	
7	Marcin Krukowski	Poland	80.56	79.91	x	x	x	x	80.56	
8	Kim Amb	Sweden	78.93	80.42	78.51	75.71	x	x	80.42	
9	Norbert Rivasz-Tóth	Hungary	79.73	77.89	76.55				79.73	
10	Cheng Chao-tsun	Chinese Taipei	74.74	77.51	77.99				77.99	
11	Keshorn Walcott	Trinidad and Tobago	75.30	77.47	x				77.47	
	Julius Yego	Kenya	x	x	x				NM	
