= 2016 European Athletics Championships – Men's javelin throw =

Men's javelin throw at the European Athletics Championships
- Venue: Museumplein (qualification); Olympic Stadium (final)
- Location: Amsterdam
- Dates: 6 July (qualification); 7 July (final)
- Competitors: 32 from 16 nations
- Winning mark: 86.66 m

Medalists
gold medal	Zigismunds Sirmais	Latvia
silver medal	Vítezslav Veselý	Czech Republic
bronze medal	Antti Ruuskanen	Finland

The men's javelin throw at the 2016 European Athletics Championships took place at the Olympic stadium for the finals and at the Museumplein for qualifying on 6 and 7 July.

== Records ==
Standing records prior to the 2016 European Athletics Championships
World record	Jan Železný (CZE)	98.48 m	Jena, Germany	25 May 1996
European record	Jan Železný (CZE)	98.48 m	Jena, Germany	25 May 1996
Championship record	Steve Backley (GBR)	89.72 m	Budapest, Hungary	23 August 1998
World Leading	Thomas Röhler (GER)	91.28 m	Turku, Finland	29 June 2016
European Leading	Thomas Röhler (GER)	91.28 m	Turku, Finland	29 June 2016

== Schedule ==
Date	Time	Round
6 July 2016	17:05	Qualifying
7 July 2016	18:35	Final

All times are local times (UTC+2)

== Results ==
=== Qualification ===
Qualification: 81.50 m (Q) or best 12 performers (q)

Rank	Group	Name	Nationality	#1	#2	#3	Result	Note
1	A	Antti Ruuskanen	Finland	88.23			88.23	Q. SB
2	B	Jakub Vadlejch	Czech Republic	80.59	85.06		85.06	Q
3	A	Vítezslav Veselý	Czech Republic	80.31	79.72	84.82	84.82	Q, SB
4	B	Thomas Röhler	Germany	83.98			83.98	Q
5	A	Zigismunds Sirmais	Latvia	82.96			82.96	Q
6	A	Ioannis Kiriazis	Greece	77.20	81.92		81.92	Q, PB
7	B	Marcin Krukowski	Poland	x	81.88		81.88	Q
8	B	Risto Mätas	Estonia	81.19	x	x	81.19	q
9	B	Jaroslav Jílek	Czech Republic	78.59	79.19	81.09	81.09	q
10	B	Łukasz Grzeszczuk	Poland	74.38	81.05	x	81.05	q
11	A	Kacper Oleszczuk	Poland	72.37	80.97	80.23	80.97	q, SB
12	B	Kim Amb	Sweden	76.23	80.70	x	80.70	q
13	B	Roberto Bertolini	Italy	70.61	76.32	80.58	80.58	
14	A	Tero Pitkämäki	Finland	x	80.52	x	80.52	
15	A	Tanel Laanmäe	Estonia	75.81	79.23	80.46	80.46	
16	A	Johannes Vetter	Germany	'79.98	x	79.90	79.98	
17	A	Matija Kranjc	Slovenia	79.56	77.87	75.68	79.56	
18	A	Dmytro Kosynskyy	Ukraine	76.75	76.75	79.21	79.21	
19	B	Ari Mannio	Finland	78.55	77.41	77.18	78.55	
20	B	Lars Hamann	Germany	78.00	76.28	78.07	78.07	
21	A	Edis Matusevičius	Lithuania	76.64	76.15	77.86	77.86	
22	B	Paraskevas Batzavalis	Greece	73.92	72.06	77.86	77.86	
23	A	Gabriel Wallin	Sweden	73.56	76.00	x	76.00	
24	A	Norbert Bonvecchio	Italy	x	73.29	75.75	75.75	
25	B	Dejan Mileusnić	Bosnia and Herzegovina	75.00	x	72.73	75.00	
26	B	Magnus Kirt	Estonia	74.20	x	74.64	74.64	
27	A	Norbert Rivasz-Tóth	Hungary	x	74.56	x	74.56	
28	B	Janis Svens Griva	Latvia	71.84	73.38	69.83	73.38	
29	B	Oleksandr Nychyporchuk	Ukraine	x	x	73.31	73.31	
30	A	Patrik Ženúch	Slovakia	68.16	69.38	x	69.38	
	A	Rolands Štrobinders	Latvia	x	x	x	NM	
	B	Vedran Samac	Serbia				DNS	

=== Final ===
Rank	Athlete	Nationality	#1	#2	#3	#4	#5	#6	Result	Notes
1st place, gold medalist(s)	Zigismunds Sirmais	Latvia	81.86	81.36	80.88	78.36	86.66	75.57	86.66	PB
2nd place, silver medalist(s)	Vítezslav Veselý	Czech Republic	74.58	81.13	83.59	77.89	83.14	80.69	83.59	
3rd place, bronze medalist(s)	Antti Ruuskanen	Finland	80.98	82.44	79.54	x	–	f	82.44	
4	Risto Mätas	Estonia	80.05	81.00	80.77	78.73	81.53	82.03	82.03	SB
5	Thomas Röhler	Germany	79.33	80.78	x	78.74	76.66	78.60	80.78	
6	Marcin Krukowski	Poland	x	x	79.49	77.90	76.71	x	79.49	
7	Kim Amb	Sweden	71.89	78.34	76.26	78.72	79.36	79.07	79.36	
8	Kacper Oleszczuk	Poland	69.96	78.11	78.21	79.34	75.18	x	79.34	
9	Jakub Vadlejch	Czech Republic	78.12	x	77.56				78.12	
10	Jaroslav Jílek	Czech Republic	x	75.05	76.92				76.92	
11	Łukasz Grzeszczuk	Poland	x	76.41	x				76.41	
12	Ioannis Kiriazis	Greece	72.68	75.57	75.34				75.57	
