= Andreas Hofmann (javelin thrower) =

German javelin thrower

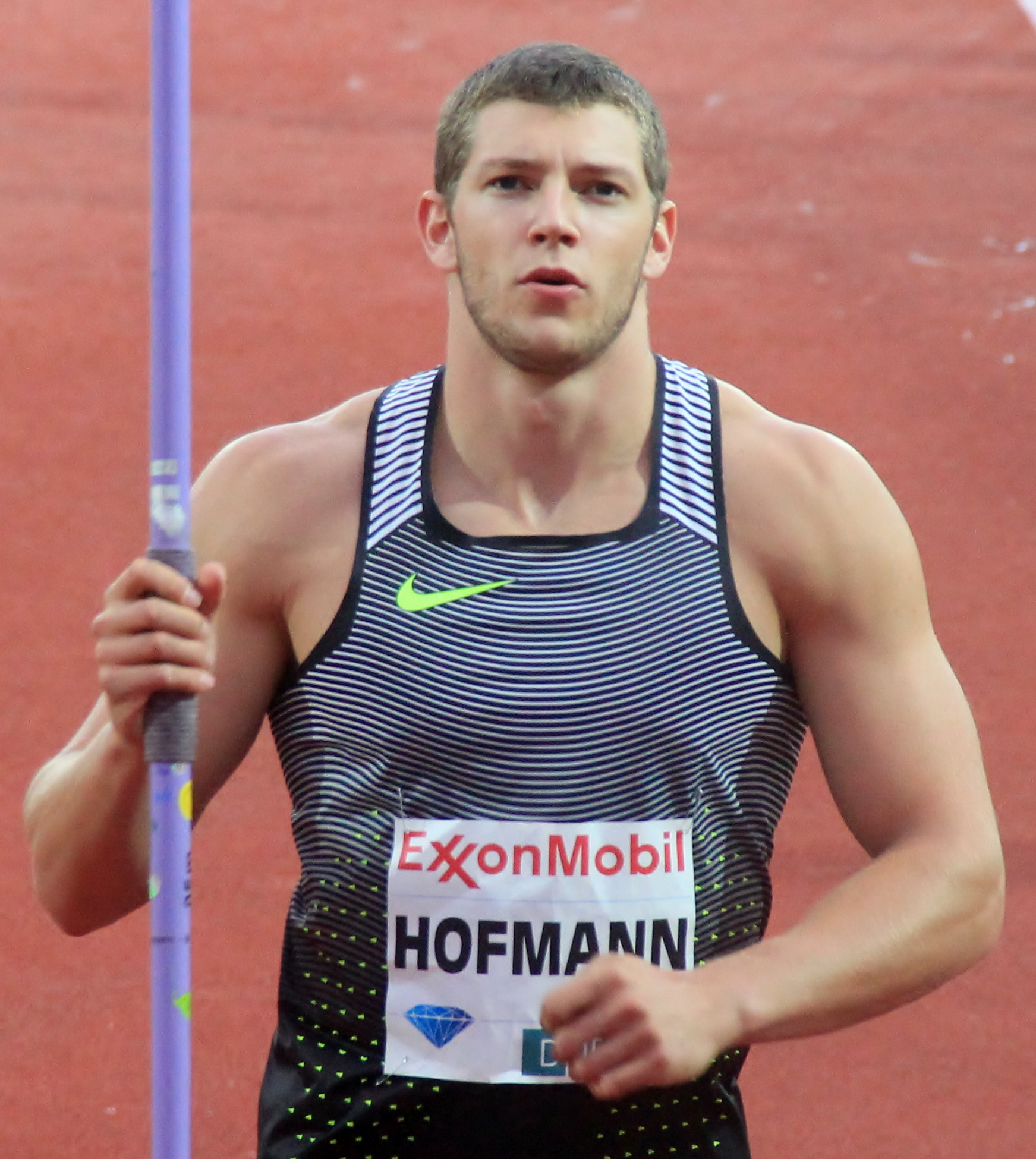
- Hofmann at Bislett Games, 2016

Personal information
- Full name: Andreas Emil Hofmann
- Born: 16 December 1991 (age 34) Heidelberg, Germany
- Education: Schiller International University, Heidelberg campus
- Height: 1.95 m (6 ft 5 in)
- Weight: 108 kg (238 lb)

Sport
- Country: Germany
- Sport: Track and field
- Event: Javelin throw
- Club: MTG Mannheim
- Coached by: Lutz Klemm

Achievements and titles
- Personal best: 92.06 m (2018)
Medal record
European Championships
Silver medal – second place	2018 Berlin	Javelin throw
Summer Universiade
Silver medal – second place	2017 Taipei	Javelin throw
- Updated on 13 August 2018

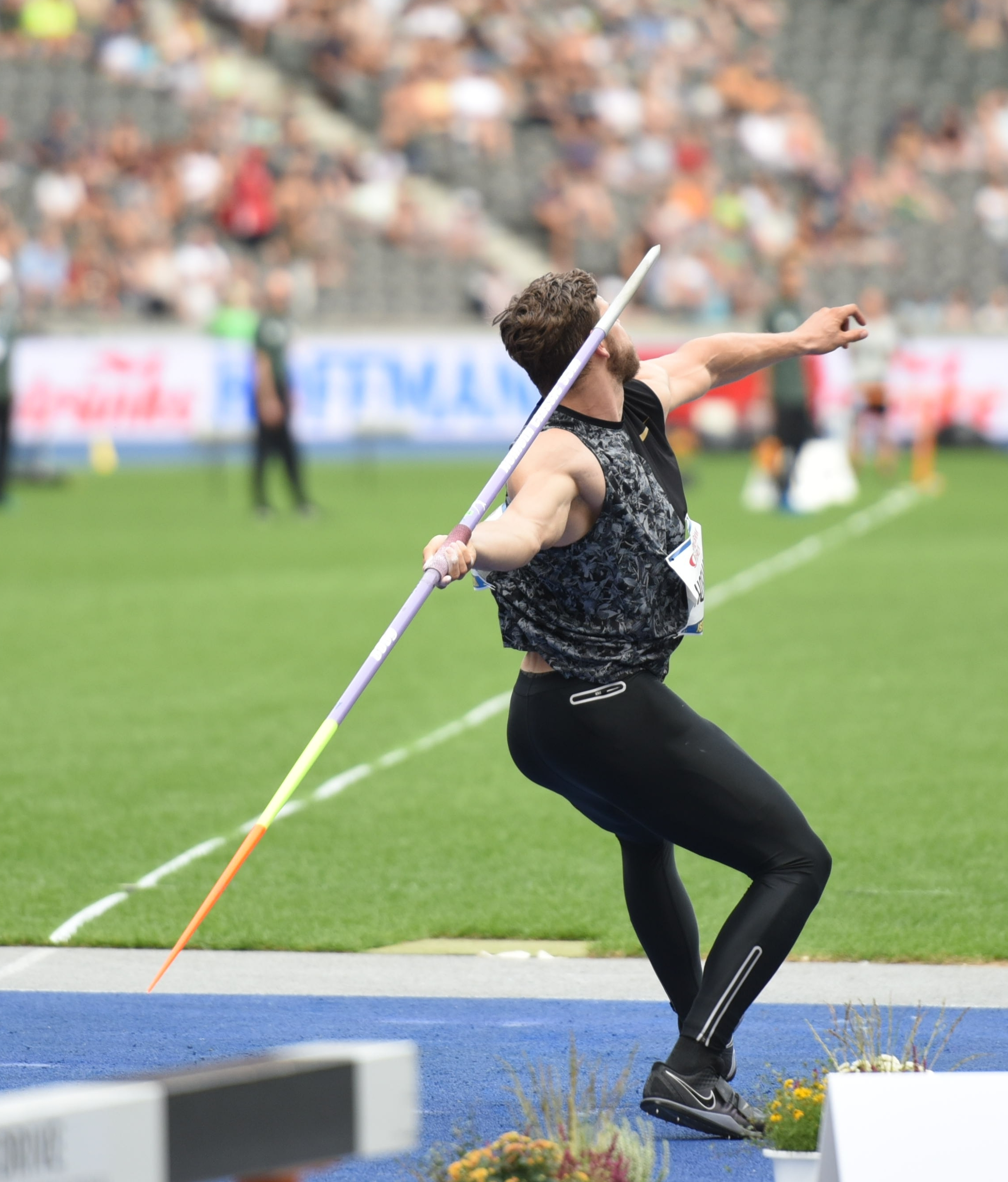
Hofmann, 2019

Andreas Emil Hofmann (born 16 December 1991) is a German track and field athlete who competes in the javelin throw. His personal best of 92.06 m ranks him eleventh on the overall list.

== Career ==
As a junior, he won gold at the 2009 European Junior Championships. His first senior international competition was the 2014 European Championships. He finished sixth at the 2015 World Championships and eight at the 2017 World Championships. His best result as of 2017 is second place at the 2017 Summer Universiade, where he set his personal best of 91.07 m.

In July 2018, he won gold at the 2018 German Athletics Championships, setting a championship record of 89.55 m. In August, he won silver at the 2018 European Athletics Championships with a throw of 87.60 m.

At the 2019 World Athletics Championships, Hofmann, with a best throw at 80.06 m, did not progress from the qualifying round.

== Competition record ==
Year	Competition	Venue	Position	Event	Notes
Representing Germany
2009	European Junior Championships	Novi Sad, Serbia	1st	Javelin throw	75.89 m
2014	European Championships	Zürich, Switzerland	9th	Javelin throw	77.42 m
2015	World Championships	Beijing, China	6th	Javelin throw	86.01 m
2017	World Championships	London, United Kingdom	8th	Javelin throw	83.98 m
2017	Universiade	Taipei, Taiwan	2nd	Javelin throw	91.07 m
2018	European Championships	Berlin, Germany	2nd	Javelin throw	87.60 m
2019	World Championships	Doha, Qatar	20th (q)	Javelin throw	80.06 m
2022	World Championships	Eugene, United States	–	Javelin throw	NM
2022	European Championships	Munich, Germany	11th	Javelin throw	74.75 m

== Seasonal bests by year ==
- 2008 – 65.03 m
- 2009 – 77.84 m
- 2010 – 66.75 m
- 2011 – 73.98 m
- 2012 – 80.81 m
- 2013 – 75.56 m
- 2014 – 86.13 m
- 2015 – 86.14 m
- 2016 – 85.42 m
- 2017 – 91.07 m
- 2018 – 92.06 m
- 2019 – 89.65 m

== Personal life ==
Hofmann studies sports science in Mannheim.
