= Jaroslav Jílek (javelin thrower) =

Czech javelin thrower

Personal information
- Born: 22 October 1989 (age 37)
- Height: 1.83 m (6 ft 0 in)
- Weight: 85 kg (187 lb)

Sport
- Sport: Athletics
- Event: Javelin throw
- Club: Hvězda Pardubice
- Coached by: Jan Železný

Jaroslav Jílek (born 22 October 1989) is a Czech javelin thrower. He represented his country at the 2017 World Championships without reaching the final.

His personal best in the event is 83.19 seconds set in Kawasaki in 2016.

== International competitions ==
Year	Competition	Venue	Position	Event	Notes
Representing the Czech Republic
2007	European Junior Championships	Hengelo, Netherlands	11th	Javelin throw	64.51 m
2016	European Championships	Amsterdam, Netherlands	10th	Javelin throw	76.92 m
2017	World Championships	London, United Kingdom	16th (q)	Javelin throw	80.97 m
2018	European Championships	Berlin, Germany	19th (q)	Javelin throw	75.83 m
2024	European Championships	Rome, Italy	–	Javelin throw	NM
