= Nemțeni =

- Commune and village
- Location in Moldova
- Coordinates: 46°55′N 28°07′E
- Country: Moldova
- District: Hîncești District

Population (2014 census)
  - Total: 1,692
- Time zone: UTC+2 (EET)
  - Summer (DST): UTC+3 (EEST)

Nemțeni is a village in Hîncești District, Moldova.

== Notable alumni ==
Andrian Mardare, athlete in athletics that specializes in Javelin Throw.
