= Alexandru Novac =

Romanian javelin thrower

Personal information
- Full name: Alexandru Mihaita Novac
- Born: 24 March 1997 (age 29) Adjud, Romania

Sport
- Sport: Athletics
- Event: Javelin throw
- Club: CS Ştiinţa Munic

Alexandru Mihăiță Novac (born 24 March 1997) is a Romanian athlete specialising in the javelin throw. He represented his country at the 2017 World Championships without qualifying for the final.

His personal best in the event is 86.37 metres set in Nembro, Italy in 2018. This is the current national record.

== International competitions ==
Year	Competition	Venue	Position	Event	Notes
Representing Romania
2014	Youth Olympic Games	Nanjing, China	2nd	Javelin throw (700 g)	73.98 m
2015	European Junior Championships	Eskilstuna, Sweden	10th	Javelin throw	69.94 m
2016	World U20 Championships	Bydgoszcz, Poland	5th	Javelin throw	72.91 m
2017	European U23 Championships	Bydgoszcz, Poland	5th	Javelin throw	77.76 m
2017	Jeux de la Francophonie	Abidjan, Ivory Coast	2nd	Javelin throw	68.85 m
2017	World Championships	London, United Kingdom	29th (q)	Javelin throw	74.67 m
2018	European Championships	Berlin, Germany	17th (q)	Javelin throw	76.44 m
2019	European U23 Championships	Gävle, Sweden	2nd	Javelin throw	81.75 m
2019	World Championships	Doha, Qatar	13th (q)	Javelin throw	82.12 m
2021	Olympic Games	Tokyo, Japan	12th	Javelin throw	79.29 m
2022	World Championships	Eugene, United States	25th (q)	Javelin throw	75.20 m
2022	European Championships	Munich, Germany	9th	Javelin throw	75.78 m
2023	Jeux de la Francophonie	Kinshasa, DR Congo	1st	Javelin throw	84.75 m
2023	World Championships	Budapest, Hungary	25th (q)	Javelin throw	75.75 m
2024	European Championships	Rome, Italy	17th (q)	Javelin throw	77.57 m
2024	Olympic Games	Paris, France	17th (q)	Javelin throw	81.08 m
