= Lars Hamann =

German javelin thrower

Personal information
- Born: 4 April 1989 (age 37) Meissen, Germany
- Height: 1.87 m (6 ft 2 in)
- Weight: 88 kg (194 lb)

Sport
- Country: Germany
- Sport: Track and field
- Event: Javelin throw
- Club: Dresdner SC 1898

Achievements and titles
- Personal best: 86.71 m (2017)
- Updated on 5 September 2016

Lars Hamann (born 4 April 1989) is a German track and field athlete who competes in the javelin throw. His personal best is 86.71 m.

== Career ==
He has represented his nation at two World Championships (2013 and 2015), missing out on the final on both occasions. He competed for Germany at the 2016 European Championships, where he finished twentieth in qualifying and did not advance to the final.

== Competition record ==
Year	Competition	Venue	Position	Event	Notes
Representing Germany
2013	World Championships	Moscow, Russia	23rd (q)	Javelin throw	77.10 m
2015	World Championships	Beijing, China	16th (q)	Javelin throw	79.56 m
2016	European Championships	Amsterdam, Netherlands	20th (q)	Javelin throw	78.07 m

== Seasonal bests by year ==
- 2006 - 67.18
- 2007 - 68.40
- 2008 - 71.03
- 2009 - 74.23
- 2010 - 77.24
- 2011 - 74.85
- 2012 - 79.55
- 2013 - 84.20
- 2014 - 79.65
- 2015 - 84.26
- 2016 - 85.79
- 2017 - 86.71
