= Marcin Krukowski =

Polish javelin thrower (born 1992)

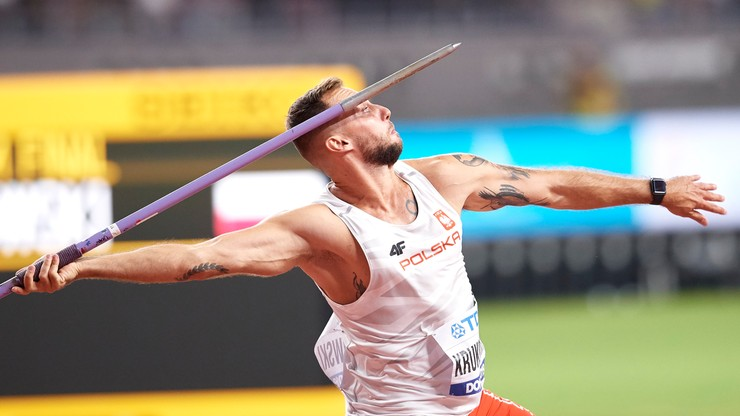
- Krukowski in 2021

Personal information
- Born: 14 June 1992 (age 34) Warsaw, Poland
- Education: Kozminski University
- Height: 1.82 m (6 ft 0 in)
- Weight: 92 kg (203 lb)

Sport
- Country: Poland
- Sport: Track and field
- Event: Javelin throw
- Club: Warszawianka Warszawa
- Coached by: Michał Krukowski

Achievements and titles
- Personal bests: NR 89.55 m (2021)
Medal record
Representing Poland
European Team Championships
| Bronze medal – third place | 2019 Bydgoszcz | Javelin |
| Silver medal – second place | 2021 Chorzów | Javelin |
Military World Games
| Silver medal – second place | 2019 Wuhan | Javelin |

Marcin Krukowski (born 14 June 1992) is a Polish track and field athlete who competes in the javelin throw. His personal best throw of 89.55 m, set in 2021, is the Polish record. He has represented his nation at three World Championships (2013, 2015 and 2017). His best performance is ninth place (2017). He also represented Poland at the 2016 Summer Olympics and the 2020 Summer Olympics.

== Personal life ==
He is the son of Agnieszka and Michał Krukowski, both of whom are former javelin throwers. His younger brother Roch is also a javelin thrower.

== Competition record ==
| Year | Competition | Venue | Position | Event | Notes |
Representing Poland
| 2009 | World Youth Championships | Brixen, Italy | 4th | Javelin throw (700 g) | 72.09 m |
| 2010 | World Junior Championships | Moncton, Canada | 27th (q) | Javelin throw | 59.24 m |
| 2011 | European Junior Championships | Tallinn, Estonia | 2nd | Javelin throw | 79.19 m |
| 2013 | European U23 Championships | Tampere, Finland | 9th | Javelin throw | 72.37 m |
| 2013 | World Championships | Moscow, Russia | 24th (q) | Javelin throw | 76.93 m |
| 2015 | World Championships | Beijing, China | 21st (q) | Javelin throw | 78.91 m |
| 2016 | European Championships | Amsterdam, Netherlands | 6th | Javelin throw | 79.49 m |
| 2016 | Olympic Games | Rio de Janeiro, Brazil | 15th (q) | Javelin throw | 80.62 m |
| 2017 | World Championships | London, England | 9th | Javelin throw | 82.01 m |
| 2017 | Universiade | Taipei, Taiwan | 5th | Javelin throw | 79.38 m |
| 2017 | DécaNation | Angers, France | 1st | Javelin throw | 78,19 m |
| 2018 | European Championships | Berlin, Germany | 4th | Javelin throw | 84.55 m |
| 2019 | World Championships | Doha, Qatar | 7th | Javelin throw | 80.56 m |
| 2019 | Military World Games | Wuhan, China | 2nd | Javelin throw | 78.17 m |
| 2019 | European Team Championships | Bydgoszcz, Poland | 3rd | Javelin throw | 79.54 m |
| 2021 | European Team Championships | Chorzów, Poland | 2nd | Javelin throw | 85.12 m |
| 2021 | Olympic Games | Tokyo, Japan | 28th (q) | Javelin throw | 74.65 m |
| 2024 | European Championships | Rome, Italy | 9th | Javelin throw | 81.24 m |
| 2024 | Olympic Games | Paris, France | 14th (q) | Javelin throw | 82.34 m |
| 2025 | World Championships | Tokyo, Japan | 21st (q) | Javelin throw | 80.29 m |
| 2026 | European Championships | Birmingham, United Kingdom | 7th | Javelin throw | 79.69 m |

== Seasonal bests by year ==
- 2009 – 65.95
- 2010 – 72.10
- 2011 – 79.19
- 2012 – 82.58
- 2013 – 83.04
- 2014 – 80.66
- 2015 – 85.20
- 2016 – 84.74
- 2017 – 88.09
- 2018 – 84.55
- 2019 – 85.72
- 2020 – 87.07
- 2021 – 89.55 NR
- 2022 – 80.44
- 2023 – 79.29
- 2024 – 82.69
