= Nicolás Quijera =

Spanish javelin thrower

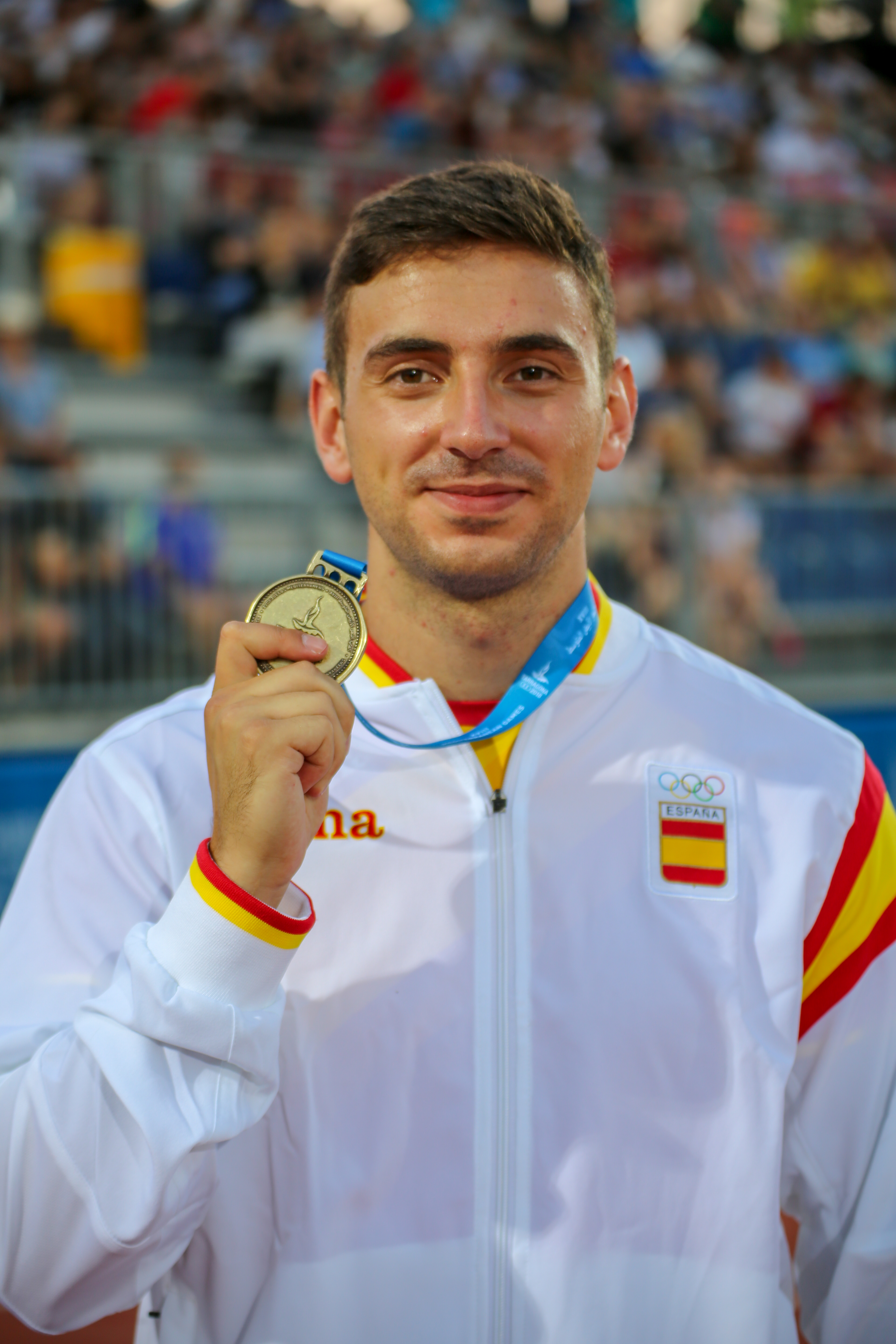
- Nicolás Quijera in 2018

Personal information
- Born: 24 June 1996 (age 30) Pamplona, Navarre, Spain
- Education: Mississippi State University
- Height: 1.88 m (6 ft 2 in)
- Weight: 85 kg (187 lb)
- Relative: Manu Quijera (brother)

Sport
- Sport: Athletics
- Event: Javelin throw
- Club: Grupompleo Pamplona Atlético
- Team: Mississippi State Bulldogs track and field
- Coached by: Idoia Mariezkurrena

Nicolás Quijera Poza (born 24 June 1996 in Pamplona) is a Spanish athlete specialising in the javelin throw. He won a gold medal at the 2018 Mediterranean Games.

His personal best in the event is 80.21 metres set in Eugene in 2018.

His brother is Manu Quijera, also a Spanish javelin thrower.

== International competitions ==
Year	Competition	Venue	Position	Event	Notes
Representing Spain
2014	World Junior Championships	Eugene, United States	14th (q)	Javelin throw	66.19 m
2015	European Junior Championships	Eskilstuna, Sweden	16th (q)	Javelin throw	67.28 m
2016	Mediterranean U23 Championships	Tunis, Tunisia	1st	Javelin throw	75.30 m
2017	European U23 Championships	Bydgoszcz, Poland	12th	Javelin throw	69.59 m
2018	Mediterranean Games	Tarragona, Spain	1st	Javelin throw	75.13 m
2018	European Championships	Berlin, Germany	24th (q)	Javelin throw	73.27 m
