= Andrian Mardare =

Moldovan javelin thrower

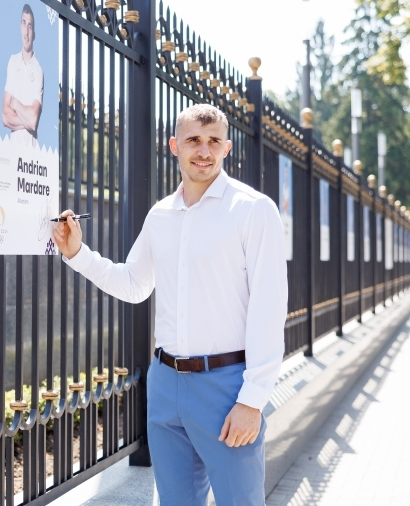
- Mardare in 2024

Personal information
- Born: 20 June 1995 (age 31) Nemțeni, Moldova
- Education: State University of Physical Education and Sports
- Height: 1.94 m (6 ft 4 in)
- Weight: 100 kg (220 lb)

Sport
- Sport: Athletics
- Event: Javelin throw

Achievements and titles
- Personal bests: 86.66M National Record (NR)

Andrian Mardare (born 20 June 1995) is a Moldovan athlete specialising in the javelin throw. He represented his country at the 2017 World Championships without qualifying for the final. Additionally, he won the bronze medal at the 2017 European U23 Championships.

== International competitions ==
Year	Competition	Venue	Position	Event	Notes
Representing Moldova
2013	European Junior Championships	Rieti, Italy	14th (q)	Javelin throw	66.32 m
2014	World Junior Championships	Eugene, United States	3rd	Javelin throw	72.81 m
2017	European Throwing Cup (U23)	Las Palmas, Spain	1st	Javelin throw	82.34 m
2017	European U23 Championships	Bydgoszcz, Poland	3rd	Javelin throw	78.76 m
2017	World Championships	London, United Kingdom	17th (q)	Javelin throw	80.18 m
2017	Universiade	Taipei, Taiwan	4th	Javelin throw	80.63 m
2018	European Championships	Berlin, Germany	7th	Javelin throw	81.54 m
2019	Universiade	Naples, Italy	1st	Javelin throw	82.40 m
2021	Championships of the Small States of Europe	Serravalle, San Marino	1st	Javelin throw	84.54 m
2021	Olympic Games	Tokyo, Japan	7th	Javelin throw	83.30 m
2022	World Championships	Eugene, United States	7th	Javelin throw	82.26 m
2022	European Championships	Munich, Germany	7th	Javelin throw	77.49 m
2023	World Championships	Budapest, Hungary	11th	Javelin throw	79.66 m
2024	European Championships	Rome, Italy	11th	Javelin throw	80.22 m
2024	Olympic Games	Paris, France	12th	Javelin throw	80.10 m
2026	European Championships	Birmingham, United Kingdom	26th (q)	Javelin throw	74.41 m
