= Magnus Kirt =

Estonian javelin thrower

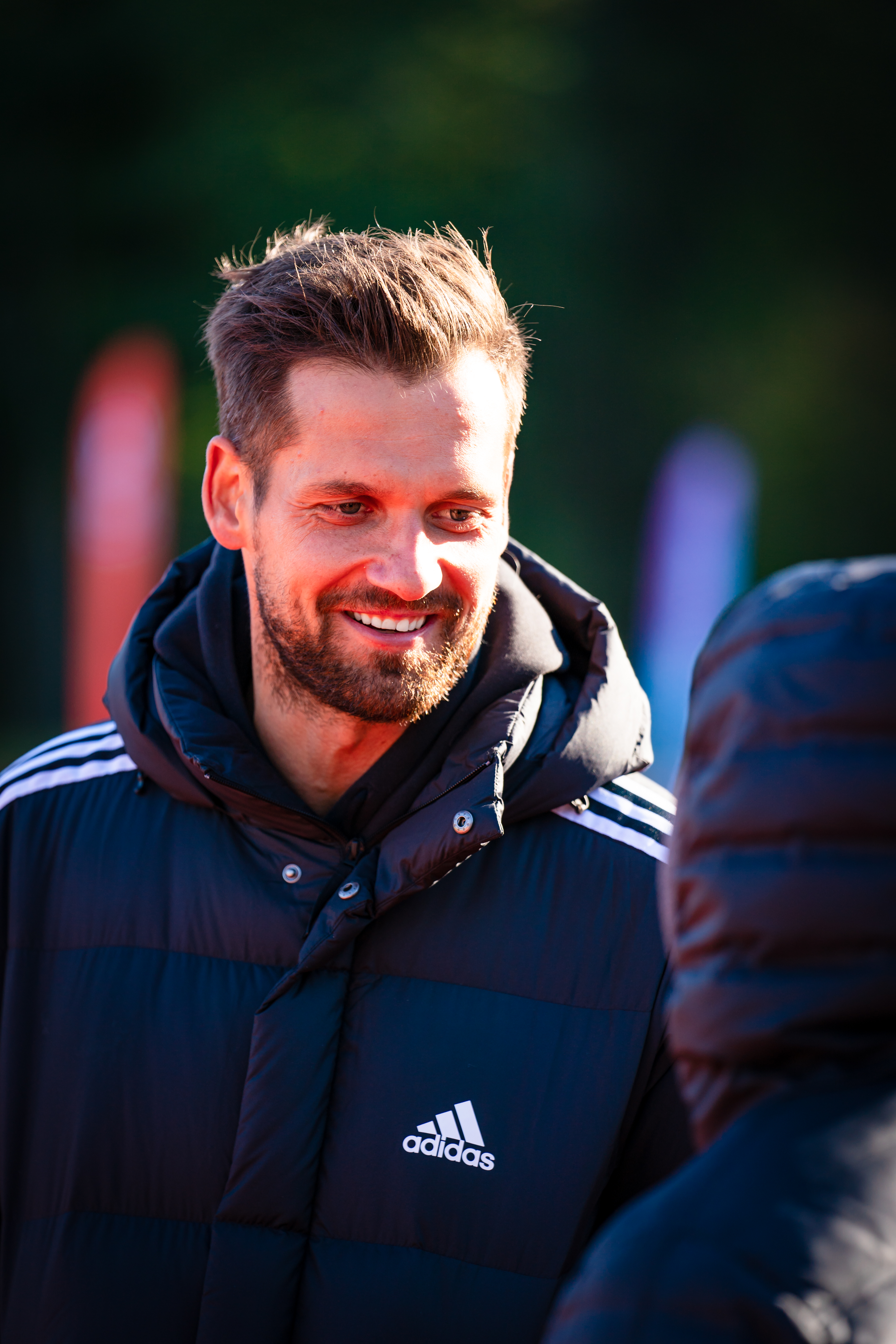
- Magnus Kirt at his home town of Tõrva, Estonia.

Personal information
- Nationality: Estonian
- Born: 10 April 1990 (age 36) Tõrva, then part of Estonian SSR, Soviet Union
- Education: Tallinn University of Technology
- Height: 1.91 m (6 ft 3 in)
- Weight: 87 kg (192 lb)

Sport
- Country: Estonia
- Sport: Athletics
- Event: Javelin throw
- Club: Audentes SK

Achievements and titles
- Personal best: 90.61 m (2019)
Medal record
World Championships
Silver medal – second place	2019 Doha	Javelin throw
European Championships
Bronze medal – third place	2018 Berlin	Javelin throw
- Updated on 7 October 2019

Magnus Kirt (born 10 April 1990) is an Estonian retired athlete who competed in the javelin throw. He won the silver medal at the 2019 World Championships. His personal best of 90.61 m is the Estonian record.

== Career ==
He competed at the 2015 World Championships in Beijing, China, without qualifying for the final, having a best throw of 82.22 metres. He competed at the 2016 Olympic Games in Rio de Janeiro, Brazil, without reaching the final, having a best throw on the day of 79.33 metres.

On 3 June 2018, he broke former world champion Andrus Värnik's long-standing national record with 88.45 m at the 54th Gustav Sule memorial competition in Tartu. He then threw 88.73 m on 5 June 2018 at Paavo Nurmi Games. On 13 July 2018 he further improved the record at the IAAF Diamond League meeting in Rabat, Morocco, taking the national record and meeting record to 89.75 m. In August, he won bronze at the 2018 European Athletics Championships in Berlin, Germany, with a throw of 85.96 m. He threw a distance over 90 meters for the first time on 20 June 2019, at the Golden Spike in Ostrava, Czech Republic, managing a 90.34 m throw, which he improved again two days later in Kuortane to 90.61 m. At the 2019 World Athletics Championships in Doha, he won silver with a throw of 86.21 m, but during his fourth throw he injured his shoulder, which ultimately ended his career.

== Personal life ==
In 2024, it was announced via social media that he was expecting his first child with his Latvian partner and fellow athlete, Laura Ikauniece. Their son was born on 19 October 2024. The two publicly announced their relationship on Valentine's Day in 2020.

== International competitions ==
Year	Competition	Venue	Position	Event	Result
Representing Estonia
2009	European Junior Championships	Novi Sad, Serbia	22nd (q)	Javelin throw	63.75 m
2011	European U23 Championships	Ostrava, Czech Republic	18th (q)	Javelin throw	66.32 m
2013	Universiade	Kazan, Russia	16th (q)	Javelin throw	69.11 m
2014	European Championships	Zürich, Switzerland	22nd (q)	Javelin throw	74.33 m
2015	Universiade	Gwangju, South Korea	8th	Javelin throw	76.65 m
2015	World Championships	Beijing, China	22nd (q)	Javelin throw	78.84 m
2016	European Championships	Amsterdam, Netherlands	26th (q)	Javelin throw	74.64 m
2016	Olympic Games	Rio de Janeiro, Brazil	23rd (q)	Javelin throw	79.33 m
2017	World Championships	London, United Kingdom	11th	Javelin throw	80.48 m
2018	European Championships	Berlin, Germany	3rd	Javelin throw	85.96 m
2019	World Championships	Doha, Qatar	2nd	Javelin throw	86.21 m

== Seasonal bests by year ==
View chart definition.
- 2009 – 72.97
- 2010 – 71.41
- 2011 – 70.07
- 2012 – 76.97
- 2013 – 79.82
- 2014 – 79.70
- 2015 – 86.65
- 2016 – 84.47
- 2017 – 86.06
- 2018 – 89.75
- 2019 – 90.61
- 2022 – 73.67

Awards
Preceded by Ott Tänak	Estonian Male Athlete of the Year; 2018–2019	Succeeded by Ott Tänak & Martin Järveoja (Athlete of the Year)
