= Michael Shuey =

American javelin thrower

Personal information
- Born: February 2, 1994 (age 32) St. Marys, Pennsylvania, United States
- Height: 6 ft 5 in (196 cm)
- Weight: 235 lb (107 kg)

Sport
- Country: United States
- Sport: Track and field
- Event: Javelin throw

Michael Shuey (born February 2, 1994) is an American track and field athlete competing in the javelin throw. In 2019, he competed in the men's javelin throw at the 2019 World Athletics Championships in Doha, Qatar. He did not qualify to compete in the final.

== Early life ==
He grew up in Johnsonburg, Pennsylvania, United States.

== Career ==
In 2019, he competed in the men's javelin throw at the Pan American Games held in Lima, Peru. He finished in 4th place.

He has qualified to represent the United States at the 2020 Summer Olympics.

== See also ==
- List of Pennsylvania State University Olympians
