= Norbert Rivasz-Tóth =

Hungarian javelin thrower

Personal information
- Born: 6 May 1996 (age 30) Törökszentmiklós, Hungary
- Education: University of Debrecen
- Height: 1.82 m (6 ft 0 in)
- Weight: 88 kg (194 lb)

Sport
- Sport: Athletics
- Event: Javelin throw
- Club: Törökszentmiklósi DAK; Szolnoki MÁV-SE
- Coached by: Lőrinc Varga

Achievements and titles
- Personal bests: NR 83.42 m (2019)

Norbert Rivasz-Tóth (born 6 May 1996) is a Hungarian track and field athlete who competes in the javelin throw. His personal best of 83.08 m, set in 2017, was the Hungarian record until 2023. He has represented his nation at the 2017 World Championships. In addition, he won the gold medal at the 2017 European U23 Championships.

== International competitions ==
Year	Competition	Venue	Position	Event	Notes
Representing Hungary
2012	World Junior Championships	Barcelona, Spain	12th	Javelin throw	66.12 m
2013	World Youth Championships	Donetsk, Ukraine	2nd	Javelin throw (700 g)	78.27 m
2013	European Junior Championships	Rieti, Italy	6th	Javelin throw	72.41 m
2014	World Junior Championships	Eugene, USA	15th (q)	Javelin throw	66.02 m
2015	European Junior Championships	Eskilstuna, Sweden	17th (q)	Javelin throw	67.01 m
2016	European Throwing Cup (U23)	Arad, Romania	2nd	Javelin throw	77.70 m
2016	European Championships	Amsterdam, Netherlands	27th (q)	Javelin throw	74.56 m
2017	European Throwing Cup (U23)	Las Palmas, Spain	2nd	Javelin throw	79.04 m
2017	European U23 Championships	Bydgoszcz, Poland	1st	Javelin throw	83.08 m NR
2017	World Championships	London, United Kingdom	21st (q)	Javelin throw	78.76 m
2017	Universiade	Taipei, Taiwan	6th	Javelin throw	78.42 m
2018	European Championships	Berlin, Germany	27th (q)	Javelin throw	69.94 m
2019	Universiade	Naples, Italy	5th	Javelin throw	77.71 m
2019	World Championships	Doha, Qatar	9th	Javelin throw	79.73 m
2021	Olympic Games	Tokyo, Japan	22nd (q)	Javelin throw	77.76 m
2024	European Championships	Rome, Italy	24th (q)	Javelin throw	71.32 m
