= Takuto Kominami =

Japanese javelin thrower

Kominami Takuto
Personal information
- Nationality: Japanese
- Born: 26 July 1995 (age 30) Sapporo, Japan

Sport
- Sport: Athletics
- Event: Javelin throw
- Club: Some Q Technology

Takuto Kominami (Japanese: 小南 拓人, born 26 July 1995) is a Japanese athlete specializing in the javelin throw. He represented Japan at the 2020 Summer Olympics in the javelin throw.

== Career ==
In April 2019, Kominami represented Japan at the 2019 Asian Athletics Championships in the javelin throw and finished in 11th place. In June 2021, he competed at the 2021 Japan Championships in Athletics and won a gold medal in the javelin throw.

Kominami represented Japan at the 2020 Summer Olympics in the javelin throw.
