= Edis Matusevičius =

Lithuanian javelin thrower (born 1996)

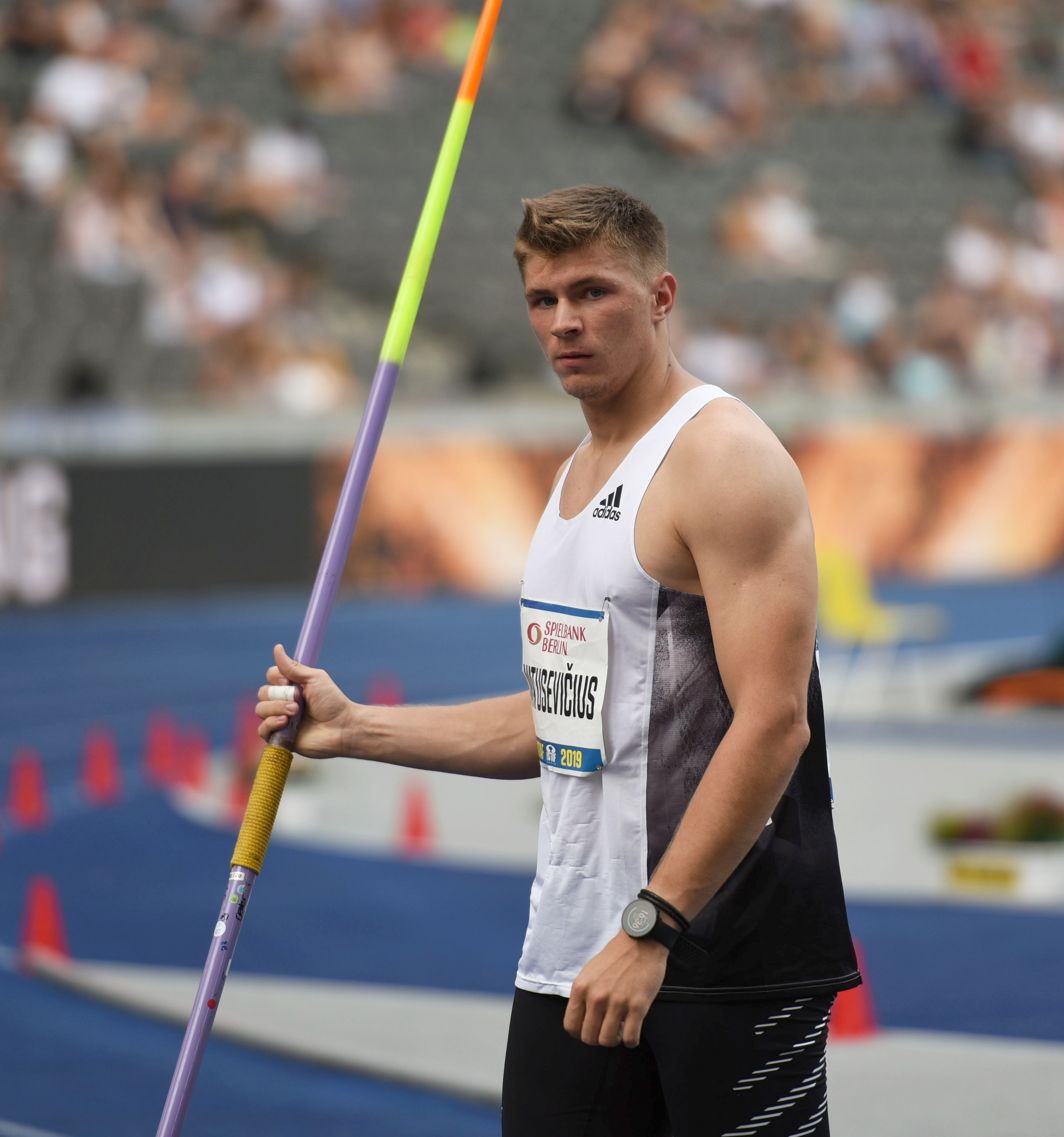

Personal information
- Born: 30 June 1996 (age 30) Vilnius, Lithuania
- Height: 1.89 m (6 ft 2 in)
- Weight: 98 kg (216 lb)

Sport
- Sport: Athletics
- Event: Javelin throw
Medal record
Men's athletics
Representing Lithuania
European Games
Silver medal – second place	2023 Kraków-Małopolska	Javelin throw
World University Games
Gold medal – first place	2021 Chengdu	Javelin throw

Edis Matusevičius (born 30 June 1996) is a Lithuanian athlete specialising in the javelin throw. He has competed at multiple major championships, including the 2020 and 2024 Olympic Games.

== Career ==
He finished sixth at the 2014 IAAF World Junior Championships in Eugene, Oregon, throwing 70.58 metres. He won the bronze medal at the 2015 European Junior Championships in Eskilstuna, Sweden with a throw of 77.48 metres. He represented his country at the senior 2017 World Championships without registering a valid mark in the qualifying round.

He set a personal best, and Lithuanian national record in the event, of 89.17 metres during the Lithuanian Athletics Championships in Palanga, in 2019. He competed at the 2019 European Athletics Team Championships, held in Sandnes, Norway in August 2019, and won the second division event with a throw of 82.35 metres. He won the gold medal at the 2019 Summer Universiade held in Naples, Italy in 2023 with a throw of 80.07 metres.

He competed in Tokyo, Japan, at the delayed 2020 Olympic Games in 2021, where he threw 81.24 metres but did progress to the final.

He won the silver medal overall at the 2023 European Athletics Team Championships, held in Silesia, Poland in June 2023, and won the second division event with a throw of 84.22 metres. He retained his title and won the gold medal at the delayed 2021 Summer World University Games held in Chengdu, China in 2023 with a throw of 80.37 metres.

He had an eighth place finish at the 2023 World Athletics Championships in Budapest, Hungary with a throw of 82.29 metres.

He finished fourth overall at the 2024 European Athletics Championships in Rome, Italy in June 2024 with a throw of 83.96 metres. He competed for Lithuania at the 2024 Olympic Games in Paris, France, but did not qualify for the final.

== International competitions ==
Year	Competition	Venue	Position	Event	Notes
Representing Lithuania
2013	World Youth Championships	Donetsk, Ukraine	17th (q)	Javelin throw (700 g)	68.88 m
2013	European Junior Championships	Rieti, Italy	21st (q)	Javelin throw	63.84 m
2014	World Junior Championships	Eugene, United States	6th	Javelin throw	70.58 m
2015	European Junior Championships	Eskilstuna, Sweden	3rd	Javelin throw	77.48 m
2016	European Championships	Amsterdam, Netherlands	21st (q)	Javelin throw	77.86 m
2017	European U23 Championships	Bydgoszcz, Poland	5th	Javelin throw	76.82 m
2017	World Championships	London, United Kingdom	–	Javelin throw	NM
2017	Universiade	Taipei, Taiwan	18th (q)	Javelin throw	70.61 m
2018	European Championships	Berlin, Germany	10th	Javelin throw	77.64 m
2019	Universiade	Naples, Italy	1st	Javelin throw	80.07 m
2019	World Championships	Doha, Qatar	22nd (q)	Javelin throw	79.60 m
2021	Olympic Games	Tokyo, Japan	14th (q)	Javelin throw	81.24 m
2023	European Games	Chorzów, Poland	2nd	Javelin throw	84.22 m
2023	World University Games	Chengdu, China	1st	Javelin throw	80.37 m
2023	World Championships	Budapest, Hungary	8th	Javelin throw	82.29 m
2024	European Championships	Rome, Italy	4th	Javelin throw	83.96 m
2024	Olympic Games	Paris, France	21st (q)	Javelin throw	79.40 m
2025	World Championships	Tokyo, Japan	13th (q)	Javelin throw	82.78 m
2026	European Championships	Birmingham, United Kingdom	6th	Javelin throw	81.07 m
