= Oliver Helander =

Finnish track and field athlete

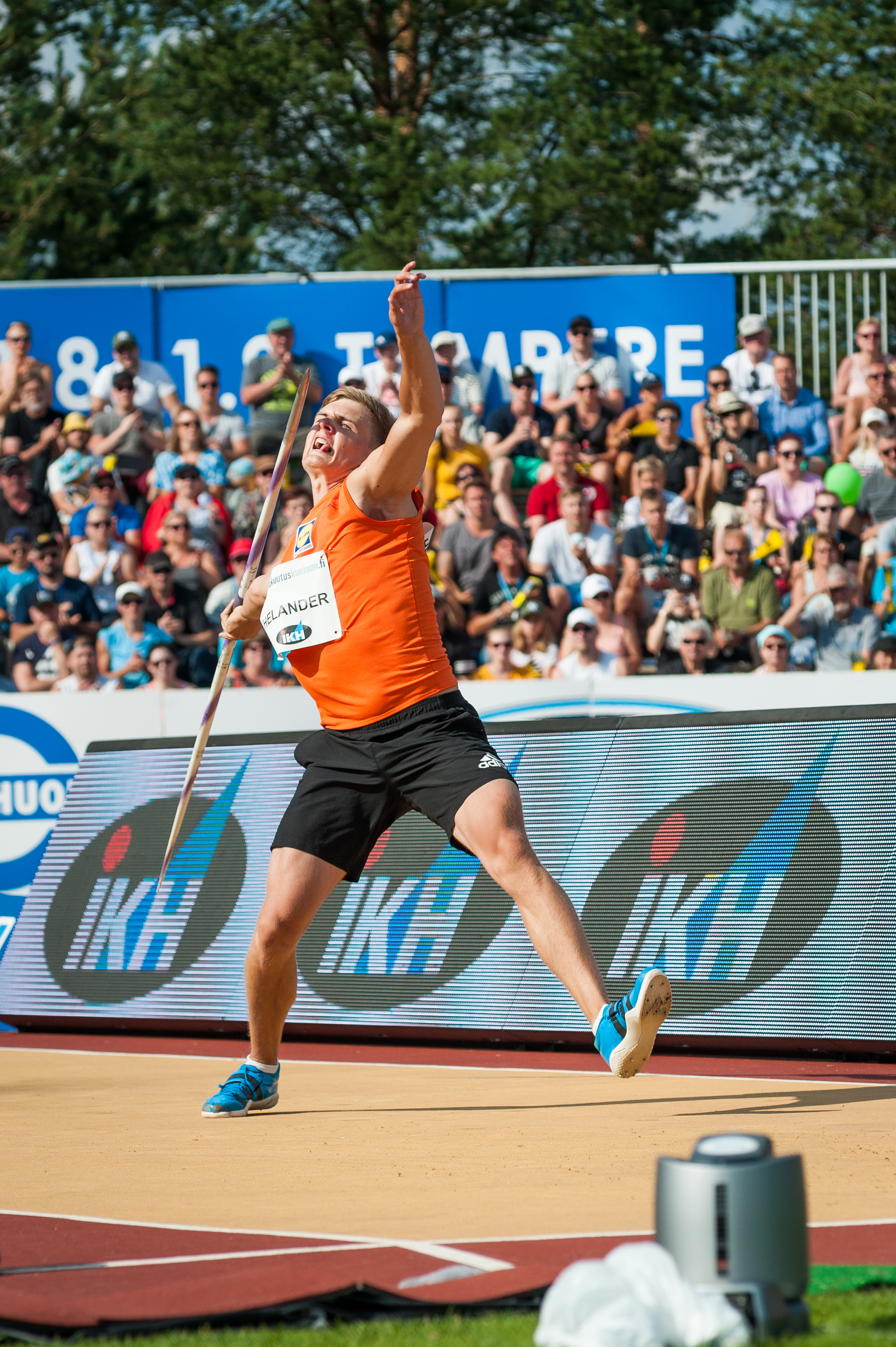
- Oliver Helander at the 2018 Kalevan Kisat

Personal information
- Born: January 1, 1997 (age 29)
- Height: 1.95 m (6 ft 5 in)
- Weight: 95 kg (209 lb)

Sport
- Country: Finland
- Sport: Track and field
- Event: Javelin throw
- Club: IF Raseborg

Achievements and titles
- Personal best: 89.83 m
Medal record
Men's athletics
Representing Finland
European Championships
| Bronze medal – third place | 2024 Rome | Javelin throw |

Oliver Helander (born 1 January 1997) is a Finnish track and field athlete who competes in the javelin throw. He has also played handball. He won the javelin throw Finnish championship in 2018.

He qualified to represent Finland at the 2020 Summer Olympics.

He is the older brother of handball player Benjamin Helander.

== Competition record ==
| Year | Competition | Venue | Position | Notes |
Representing Finland
| 2013 | World Youth Championships | Donetsk, Ukraine | 4th | 75.36 m |
| 2015 | European Junior Championships | Eskilstuna, Sweden | 7th | 74.81 m |
| 2017 | European U23 Championships | Bydgoszcz, Poland | 7th | 74.46 m |
| 2018 | European Championships | Berlin, Germany | 16th (q) | 76.64 m |
| 2019 | World Championships | Doha, Qatar | 19th (q) | 80.36 m |
| 2021 | Olympic Games | Tokyo, Japan | 17th (q) | 78.81 m |
| 2022 | World Championships | Eugene, United States | 8th | 82.24 m |
| 2023 | World Championships | Budapest, Hungary | 7th | 83.38 m |
| 2024 | European Championships | Rome, Italy | 3rd | 85.75 m |
| 2024 | Olympic Games | Paris, France | 9th | 82.68 m |
| 2025 | World Championships | Tokyo, Japan | 23rd (q) | 79.75 m |
| 2026 | European Championships | Birmingham, United Kingdom | 15th (q) | 78.43 m |

== Seasonal bests by year ==
- 2011 - 57.43 m
- 2014 - 69.04 m
- 2015 - 76.28 m
- 2016 - 71.67 m
- 2017 - 80.25 m
- 2018 - 88.02 m
- 2019 - 86.93 m
- 2021 - 86.13 m
- 2022 - 89.83 m
