= Ioannis Kiriazis =

Greek javelin thrower (born 1996)

Personal information
- Nationality: Greek
- Born: 19 January 1996 (age 30)
- Education: Texas A&M University
- Height: 1.92 m (6 ft 4 in)
- Weight: 84 kg (185 lb)

Sport
- Country: Greece
- Sport: Track and field
- Event: Javelin throw

Achievements and titles
- Personal best: 88.01 m (2017)
Medal record
Athletics
Representing Greece
European Throwing Cup
Gold medal – first place	2025 Nicosia	Javelin Throw

Ioannis Kiriazis (Greek: Ιωάννης Κυριαζής; born 19 January 1996) is a Greek track and field athlete who competes in the javelin throw.

His personal best in the event is 88.01 metres set in Austin, Texas in 2017.

Kiriazis served a four-year ban from 2019 to 2023 for an anti-doping rule violation after testing positive for ligandrol.

== International competitions ==
Year	Competition	Venue	Position	Event	Notes
Representing Greece
2016	European Championships	Amsterdam, Netherlands	12th	Javelin throw	75.57 m
2017	European Team Championships	Lille, France	2nd	Javelin throw	86.33 m
2017	European U23 Championships	Bydgoszcz, Poland	2nd	Javelin throw	81.04 m
2017	World Championships	London, United Kingdom	6th	Javelin throw	84.52 m
2024	European Championships	Rome, Italy	18th (q)	Javelin throw	77.54 m
2025	European Throwing Cup	Nicosia, Cyprus	1st	Javelin throw	84.38 m SB
