= Manu Quijera =

Spanish javelin thrower (born 1998)

Personal information
- Full name: Manu Quijera Poza
- Nationality: Spain
- Born: 13 January 1998 (28 years, 220 days old)
- Relative: Nicolás Quijera (brother)

Sport
- Sport: Athletics
- Event: Javelin throw
- Club: Grupompleo Pamplona At
- Coached by: Idoia Mariezkurrena

Achievements and titles
- National finals: 2015 Spanish U18s; • Javelin throw, 1st (gold); 2015 Spanish Champs; • Javelin throw, 5th; 2016 Spanish U20s; • Javelin throw, 1st (gold); 2017 Spanish U20s; • Javelin throw, 1st (gold); 2018 Spanish Champs; • Javelin throw, 2nd (silver); 2018 Spanish Champs; • Javelin throw, 2nd (silver); 2019 Spanish U23s; • Javelin throw, 1st (gold); 2019 Spanish Champs; • Javelin throw, 1st (gold); 2021 Spanish Champs; • Javelin throw, 2nd (silver); 2022 Spanish Champs; • Javelin throw, 1st (gold); 2023 Spanish Champs; • Javelin throw, 3rd (bronze)
- Personal bests
Medal record
Men's athletics
Representing Spain
Mediterranean U23 Championships
Gold medal – first place	2018 Jesolo	Javelin throw
European Throwing Cup
Bronze medal – third place	2023 Leira	Javelin throw
- Updated on 15 January 2024

Manu Quijera Poza (born 13 January 1998) is a Spanish javelin thrower. He is a two-time Spanish Athletics Championships winner, and was the bronze medalist at the 2023 European Throwing Cup.

== Early life ==
Manu Quijera began javelin throwing in his native Pamplona at the age of 13, following in the footsteps of his brother Nico, also a javelin thrower, under the guidance of Idoia Mariezkurrena. Between 2013 and 2017, he was the Spanish champion in his age category five times in a row.

== Career ==
By virtue of his national titles, Quijera was invited to compete in the javelin throw at the 2015 World U18 Championships. He posted the second-best mark in the qualification behind only Hercules van Vuuren, who failed to medal in the finals. Given this, Quijera was in good position to medal after the first few throws, but he was eventually overtaken and had to settle for 4th place.

In 2018, he was the runner-up in the Spanish senior championship after his brother Nico; it was the first time that two brothers shared the podium in the national championship since 1953. He finished the year as the third-best thrower in the national ranking, behind Odei Jainaga and his brother; these two were the first Spanish athletes that year to surpass the 80-meter barrier in javelin throwing.

On 18 May 2019, he broke the Spanish javelin record during an under-23 international throwing event held in Madrid, with a mark of 81.31 m, surpassing Jainaga's record by 67 cm. In August, he made his senior international debut as a member of the Spanish team at the European Team Championships, finishing fourth in his event.

In 2022, he improved his personal best to 83.28 m, which led him to participate in the World Championships and later in the European Championships, although he did not reach the final in either event.

In 2023, he was part of the Spanish team that finished fourth in the European Games and achieved seventh place in the javelin event.

== Statistics ==
=== Best performances ===
Event	Mark	Place	Competition	Venue	Date	Ref
Javelin throw	83.28 m	1st place, gold medalist(s)	Spanish Club Championships; Spanish: Liga Joma De Clubes Division De Honor Hombres	La Nucia, Spain	12 June 2022	
Javelin throw (700 g)	77.26 m NU18R	(silver) (Qualifying round)	World Athletics U18 Championships	Cali, Colombia	19 July 2015	
