= Felise Vaha'i Sosaia =

Wallisian athlete (born 1999)

Personal information
- Born: 30 July 1999 (age 23) Mata Utu

Sport
- Country: Wallis and Futuna
- Sport: Javelin throw
Medal record
Men's Javelin throw
Representing France
Mediterranean Games
Bronze medal – third place	2022 Oran	Javelin
Bronze medal – third place	2026 Taranto	Javelin
Representing Wallis and Futuna
Pacific Games
Gold medal – first place	2019 Apia	Javelin

Felise Vaha'i Sosaia (born 30 July 1999) is a Wallisian athlete who specialises in the javelin throw.

Sosaia is from Mata Utu. After practicing athletics in Wallis at the Kafika stadium, he left in 2016 for New Caledonia to study at the Jules Garnier high school in Nouméa. He then trained for a professional diploma in youth, popular education and sport in Koutio in parallel with his sports training.

At the 2019 Pacific Games in Apia he won a gold in the javelin with a throw of 62.41m. In July 2021, he won the French javelin championships. He won a bronze medal at the 2022 Mediterranean Games. At the 2022 European Athletics Championships he came 9th in his heat, and did not qualify for the final.
