= Matija Muhar =

Slovenian javelin thrower

Personal information
- Full name: Matija Jacobus Muhar
- Born: 22 July 1996 (age 29)

Sport
- Country: Slovenia
- Sport: Track and field
- Event: Javelin throw

Achievements and titles
- Personal best: 79.20 m (2015)

Matija Muhar (born 22 July 1996) is a Slovenian track and field athlete who competes in the javelin throw. He won a gold medal at the World U18 Championships in 2013.
