= Sindri Hrafn Guðmundsson =

Icelandic javelin thrower (born 2000)

Personal information
- Born: 21 November 1995 (age 30)

Sport
- Sport: Athletics
- Event: Javelin throw

Achievements and titles
- Personal best: Javelin throw 82.55m (2024)

Sindri Hrafn Guðmundsson (born 21 November 1995) is an Icelandic athlete who competes in the javelin throw. He is a multiple-time national champion.

== Biography ==
A member of the Breiðablik athletics club, he represented Iceland at the 2014 World Junior Championships in the javelin throw in Eugene, Oregon, and became Icelandic age-group record holder.

After travelling to study in the United States at Utah State University, he placed twentieth overall in the javelin throw at the 2018 European Athletics Championships in Berlin, Germany. That year, he won the Icelandic national title in the javelin with a throw of 77.01 metres at the Icelandic Athletics Championships in Sauðárkrókur.

He set a new personal best throw of 81.21 metres competing in the a United States in the first part of 2024. He then competed at the 2024 European Athletics Championships in Rome, Italy. He managed to increase his personal best again to 82.55 metres in winning the Icelandic Championships, later that month in Akureyri.

He threw 74.54 metres to finish runner-up at the 2025 European Athletics Team Championships Third Division in the javelin throw in Maribor, Slovenia, in June 2025, to help Iceland to win the division and gain promotion. That summer, he won the Icelandic national title once again at the Icelandic Championships, with a throw of 76.35 metres to retain his title in Selfoss. He qualified through ranking for his world championships debut and was one of three throwers selected to represent Iceland at the 2025 World Athletics Championships in Tokyo, Japan, where he threw 75.56 metres without advancing to the final.

In August 2026, he placed tenth overall competing at the 2026 European Athletics Championships in Birmingham, England, in the javelin throw.
