= Julian Weber =

German javelin thrower

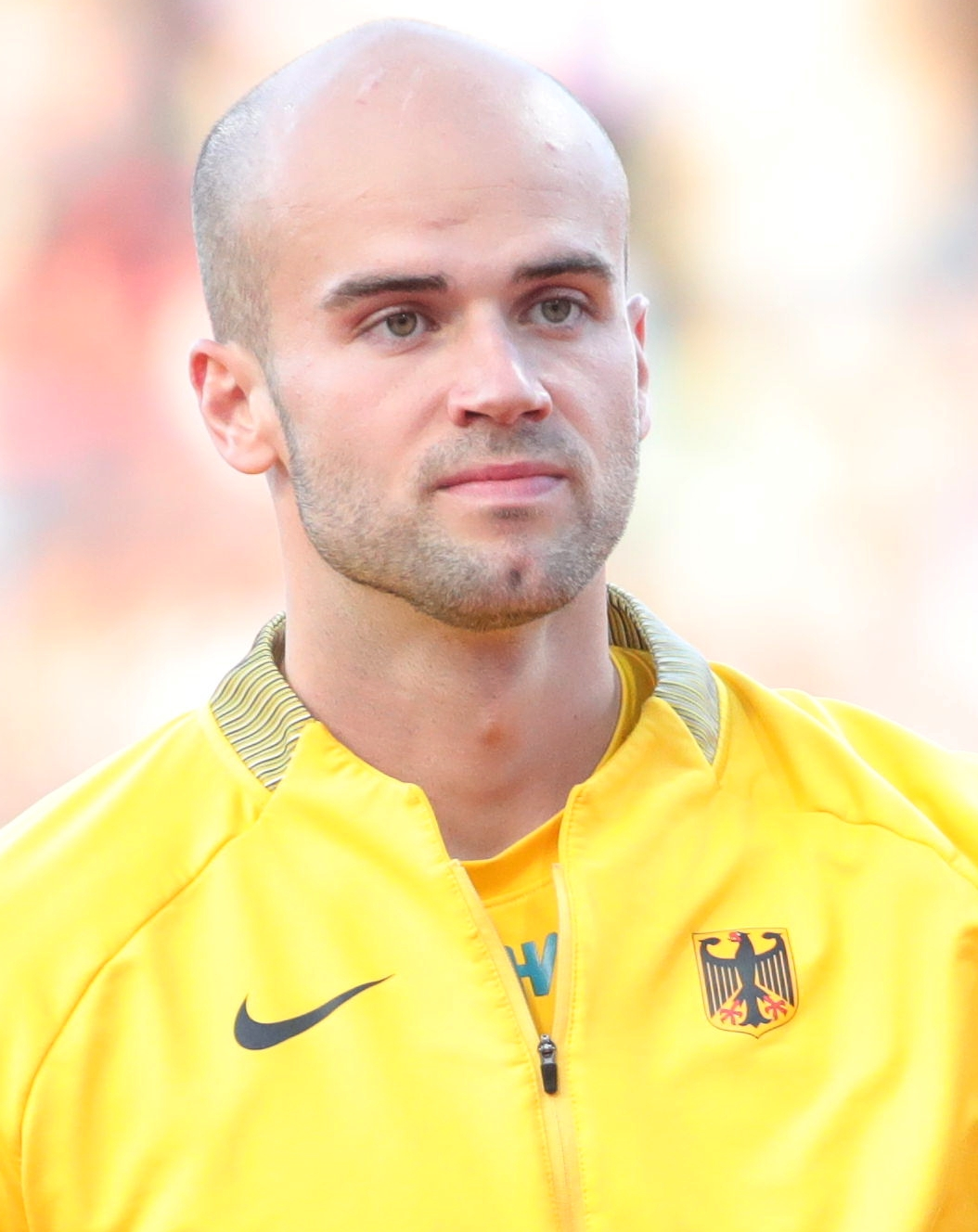
- Weber at the 2022 European Championships

Personal information
- Born: August 29, 1994 (age 32) Mainz, Germany
- Height: 1.91 m (6 ft 3 in)
- Weight: 98 kg (216 lb)

Sport
- Sport: Track and field
- Event: Javelin throw
- Club: USC Mainz
- Coached by: Stephan Kallenberg

Achievements and titles
- Personal best: 91.51 m (2025)
Medal record
Men's athletics
Representing Germany
World Ultimate Championship
Third place	2026 Budapest	Javelin throw
Diamond League
First place	2025	Javelin throw
European Championships
Gold medal – first place	2022 Munich	Javelin throw
Gold medal – first place	2026 Birmingham	Javelin throw
Silver medal – second place	2024 Rome	Javelin throw
European Games
Gold medal – first place	2023 Kraków–Małopolska	Javelin throw
Junior European Championships
Gold medal – first place	2013 Rieti	Javelin throw

Julian Weber (born 29 August 1994) is a German javelin thrower.

== Biography ==
Weber was born in Mainz on 29 August 1994. He showed early promise as a thrower, but dropped athletics as a 12-year-old to concentrate on handball, the sport of his elder brother Patrick. He returned to the javelin four years later, immediately qualifying for the 2011 German youth championships; coached by Stephan Kallenberg, Weber developed rapidly as a thrower, but quit handball only after injuring himself in a game in 2012. At the 2013 European Junior Championships in Rieti Weber took gold with a fifth-round throw of 79.68 m, a personal best and the best in the world by a junior that year; he narrowly defeated Ukraine's Maksym Bohdan, who also threw beyond the previous world junior leading mark.

Weber broke 80 meters for the first time in 2014 (80.72 m), winning silver behind Thomas Röhler at that year's national championships. In 2015 he improved his best to 81.15 m and placed fifth at the European U23 Championships in Tallinn. Weber reached a new level in 2016, throwing beyond 82 meters in four spring meets; at the national championships he again placed second behind Röhler (with a personal best 83.79 m), but was still left out of the German team for the European Athletics Championships in Amsterdam.

Weber broke his personal best twice more on 29 June 2016 with throws of 84.45 m and 86.83 m at the Paavo Nurmi Games in Turku; the three-meter improvement marked his breakthrough to the world elite, though he was still overshadowed by Röhler, who won the competition with a world-leading 91.28 m and also had a second throw beyond 91 meters. A week and a half later Weber threw 88.04 m in Offenburg, moving him to fourth place on the 2016 world list. He was selected to represent Germany at the 2016 Summer Olympics in Rio de Janeiro, together with Röhler and Johannes Vetter.

== Performance Record ==
=== Seasonal Bests ===
Year	Date	Location	Performance	Notes
2012	19 August	Wetzlar, Germany	71.12 m	
2013	20 July	Rieti, Italy	79.68 m	
2014	26 July	Ulm, Germany	80.72 m	
2015	25 May	Rehlingen, Germany	81.15 m	
2016	3 September	Berlin, Germany	88.29 m	
2017	11 March	Las Palmas, Spain	85.85 m	
2018	18 August	(United Kingdom) Birmingham, England	86.63 m	
2019	9 August	Bydgoszcz, Poland	86.86 m	
2021	9 September	Zurich, Switzerland	87.03 m	
2022	6 June	Hengelo, Netherlands	89.54 m	
2023	8 July	Kassel, Germany	88.72 m	
2024	1 September	Berlin, Germany	88.64 m	
2025	28 August	Zurich, Switzerland	91.51 m	
2026	15 August	(United Kingdom) Birmingham, England	90.40 m	
