= Yashvir Singh (javelin thrower) =

Indian javelin thrower (born 2001)

Personal information
- Other names: Yashvir Tanwar
- Born: 22 October 2001 (age 24) Devsar, Haryana, India

Sport
- Sport: Athletics
- Event: Javelin throw

Achievements and titles
- Personal best: 85.72 m (2026)
Medal record
Men's athletics
Representing India
Asian Games
| Silver medal – second place | 2026 Aichi–Nagoya | Javelin throw |
Commonwealth Games
| Bronze medal – third place | 2026 Glasgow | Javelin throw |

Yashvir Singh (born 22 October 2001), also known as Yashvir Tanwar, is an Indian javelin thrower. He won the silver medal at the 2026 Asian Games and bronze medal at the 2026 Commonwealth Games.

== Early life ==
Yashvir was born on 22 October 2001 in Devsar, Haryana and raised in Jaipur, Rajasthan. He was initially interested in basketball. At age 13, he shifted to javelin throw and began training with a bamboo javelin before transitioning to standard equipment. Under the guidance of his father, Rai Singh, a former national level javelin thrower representing the Indian Railways, he developed rapidly in the discipline.

== Career ==
Yashvir broke Neeraj Chopra's meet record at the Indian U20 Federation Cup, and made a javelin throw over 80 m for the first time in 2022.

He placed fifth overall in the javelin throw at the 2025 Asian Championships in Gumi, with a personal best 82.57 m. At the 2025 Neeraj Chopra Classic in Bengaluru, he finished eighth with a throw of 79.65 m. At the 2025 World Championships in Tokyo, Yashvir threw 77.51 m in the qualification round to finish 30th among 37 athletes and did not advance to the final.

At the 2026 Commonwealth Games in Glasgow, he won the bronze medal with a personal best throw of 85.41 m. Yashvir became only the third Indian to medal in the event at the Commonwealth Games, after Kashinath Naik (2010, bronze) and Neeraj Chopra (2018, gold; 2026, silver). He again threw a personal best throw of 85.72 m to win the silver medal at the 2026 Asian Games in Nagoya.

== International competitions ==
Representing India
| Year | Competition | Host | Position | Result |
|---|---|---|---|---|
| 2025 | Asian Championships | Gumi, South Korea | 5th | 82.57 m |
| 2025 | World Championships | Tokyo, Japan | 30th (Q) | 77.51 m |
| 2026 | Commonwealth Games | Glasgow, Scotland | 3rd | 85.41 m |
| 2026 | Asian Games | Nagoya, Japan | 2nd | 85.72 m |
