= 2022 World Athletics U20 Championships – Men's javelin throw =

Men's javelin throw at the 2022 World Athletics U20 Championships
- Venue: Estadio Olímpico Pascual Guerrero
- Dates: 4 August (qualification); 5 August (final)
- Competitors: 17 from 14 nations
- Winning distance: 79.36 m

Medalists
gold medal	Artur Felfner	Ukraine
silver medal	Max Dehning	Germany
bronze medal	Keyshawn Strachan	Bahamas

The men's javelin throw at the 2022 World Athletics U20 Championships was held at the Estadio Olímpico Pascual Guerrero on 4 and 5 August.

20 athletes from 15 countries were entered to the competition, however 18 athletes from 14 countries were on the final entry list.

== Records ==
U20 standing records prior to the 2022 World Athletics U20 Championships were as follows:

Record	Athlete & Nationality	Mark	Location	Date
World U20 Record	Neeraj Chopra (IND)	86.48	Bydgoszcz, Poland	23 July 2016
Championship Record	Neeraj Chopra (IND)	86.48	Bydgoszcz, Poland	23 July 2016
World U20 Leading	Artur Felfner (UKR)	84.32	Šamorín, Slovakia	9 January 2022

== Results ==
=== Qualification ===
The qualification started on 4 August at 09:00. Athletes attaining a mark of at least 72.50 metres ( Q ) or at least the 12 best performers ( q ) qualified for the final.

Rank	Name	Nationality	Round			Mark	Notes
Rank	Name	Nationality	1	2	3	Mark	Notes
1	Keyshawn Strachan	Bahamas	65.96	71.42	76.87	76.87	Q
2	Artur Felfner	Ukraine	75.77			75.77	Q
3	Max Dehning	Germany	x	73.10		73.10	Q
4	György Herczeg	Hungary	65.27	72.63		72.63	Q
5	Eleftherios Kontonikolas	Greece	70.50	71.20	69.71	71.20	q
6	Rumesh Tharanga	Sri Lanka	69.47	70.68	70.17	70.68	q, PB
7	Kento Inoue	Japan	63.39	65.96	69.84	69.84	q
8	Vivek Kumar	India	68.33	x	69.68	69.68	q
9	Michael Allison	Great Britain	58.54	64.38	69.60	69.60	q
10	Evan Niedrowski	United States	66.61	65.38	69.42	69.42	q
11	Mathys Moutarde	France	65.67	69.11	69.22	69.22	q
12	Ryusei Nakamura	Japan	67.24	68.08	68.88	68.88	q
13	Onni Ruokangas	Finland	64.50	67.81	x	67.81	
14	Armand Willemse	South Africa	60.31	65.80	61.91	65.80	
15	Benjamin East	Great Britain	61.51	57.95	64.05	64.05	
16	Connor Barnes	South Africa	61.24	61.72	62.21	62.21	
17	Anthony Diaz	Trinidad and Tobago	52.63	55.38	x	55.38	
	Simon Schmitt	Germany	DNS				

=== Final ===
Rank	Name	Nationality	Round						Mark	Notes
Rank	Name	Nationality	1	2	3	4	5	6	Mark	Notes
1st place, gold medalist(s)	Artur Felfner	Ukraine	76.20	71.33	74.68	72.45	79.36	x	79.36	
2nd place, silver medalist(s)	Max Dehning	Germany	76.05	77.24	74.68	72.06	74.76	75.16	77.24	
3rd place, bronze medalist(s)	Keyshawn Strachan	Bahamas	70.04	x	x	x	72.95	71.71	72.95	
4	Vivek Kumar	India	68.74	70.66	72.17	65.64	65.56	66.77	72.17	PB
5	Eleftherios Kontonikolas	Greece	68.95	72.11	70.49	67.53	–	–	72.11	
6	Mathys Moutarde	France	64.89	65.34	71.31	61.73	65.35	65.51	71.31	
7	Rumesh Tharanga	Sri Lanka	68.31	67.36	69.98	68.43	66.00	68.28	69.98	
8	Evan Niedrowski	United States	65.35	65.02	69.25	66.72	67.93	65.47	69.25	
9	Ryusei Nakamura	Japan	67.89	66.39	68.17				68.17	
10	György Herczeg	Hungary	66.08	x	67.22				67.22	
11	Kento Inoue	Japan	x	66.61	59.56				66.61	
12	Michael Allison	United States	62.86	63.02	59.79				63.02	
