= Rohit Yadav =

Indian javelin thrower (born 2001)

Personal information
- Full name: Rohit Sabhajeet Yadav
- Born: 6 June 2001 (age 25) Dabhiya, Uttar Pradesh, India
- Height: 1.83 m (6 ft 0 in)

Sport
- Sport: Athletics
- Event: Javelin throw
- Club: Inspire Institute of Sport
- Coached by: Sergey Makarov

Achievements and titles
- Personal best: 87.68 m (2026)
Medal record
Men's athletics
Representing India
Asian Games
Bronze medal – third place	2026 Aichi–Nagoya	Javelin throw
Gymnasiade
Gold medal – first place	2016 Trabzon	Javelin throw

Rohit Sabhajeet Yadav (born 6 June 2001) is an Indian javelin thrower. He won the bronze medal at the 2026 Asian Games.

== Early life ==
Rohit Yadav was born on 6 June 2001, in Dabhiya village in Jaunpur district of Uttar Pradesh, into a humble family with deep sporting background. His father, Sabhajeet Yadav, a farmer and former decathlete, was determined that his sons take up javelin throw, but the family could not afford a proper javelin. So he began cutting javelins out of wild bamboo found near the village and used them to train Rohit and his two younger brothers.

== Career ==
Yadav made his international debut at the 2016 Gymnasiade in Trabzon, where he won the gold medal with a throw of 69.26 m.

At the 2017 Asian Youth Championships in Bangkok, he won the silver medal with throw of 74.30 m. He was later disqualified following a doping violation after testing positive for stanozolol in a sample collected at the 2017 National Youth Championships. He received a one-year suspension and his medal was stripped.

At the 2022 World Championships, he finished tenth with a throw of 78.72 m, and later finished sixth at the 2022 Commonwealth Games with a throw of 82.22 m.

In 2023, after making a personal best throw of 83.40 m at the National Federation Cup, he picked up an elbow ligament injury. Forced to undergo surgery and an extended rehabilitation period, he missed the World Championships, Asian Championships, Asian Games and eventually the 2024 Olympic Games.

At the 2025 Neeraj Chopra Classic in Bengaluru, he finished tenth with a throw of 77.11 m. At the 2025 World Championships, he finished 28th among 37 athletes in the qualification round with a throw of 77.81 m and failed to advance to the final.

Yadav finished seventh at the 2026 Commonwealth Games in Glasgow, with a throw of 81.56 m. At the 2026 Indian Open, a WACT Silver level meet in Bhubaneswar, he recorded a personal best of 87.68 m on his final attempt to win gold, registering the second-best throw ever by an Indian, behind only Neeraj Chopra.

== International competitions ==
Representing India
Year	Competition	Host	Position	Result
2016	Gymnasiade	Trabzon, Turkey	1st	69.26 m
2017	Asian Youth Championships	Bangkok, Thailand	DQ [40.8]	~~74.30 m~~
2022	World Championships	Eugene, U.S.	10th	78.72 m
2022	Commonwealth Games	Birmingham, England	6th	82.22 m
2025	World Championships	Tokyo, Japan	28th (Q)	77.81 m
2026	Commonwealth Games	Glasgow, Scotland	7th	81.56 m
2026	Asian Games	Nagoya, Japan	3rd	84.35 m
