= 2025 Asian Athletics Championships – Men's javelin throw =

Men's javelin throw at the 2025 Asian Athletics Championships
- Venue: Gumi Civic Stadium
- Location: Gumi, South Korea
- Dates: 30 May (qualification); 31 May (final)
- Competitors: 22 from 14 nations
- Winning distance: 86.40 m

Medalists
gold medal	Arshad Nadeem	Pakistan
silver medal	Sachin Yadav	India
bronze medal	Yuta Sakiyama	Japan

The men's javelin throw event at the 2025 Asian Athletics Championships was held on 30 and 31 May.

== Records ==
Records before the 2025 Asian Athletics Championships
Record	Athlete (nation)	Distance (m)	Location	Date
World record	Jan Železný (CZE)	98.48	Jena, East Germany	25 May 1986
Asian record	Arshad Nadeem (PAK)	92.97	Paris, France	8 August 2024
Championship record	Cheng Chao-tsun (TPE)	86.72	Doha, Qatar	22 April 2019
World leading	Julian Weber (GER)	91.06	Doha, Qatar	16 May 2025
Asian leading	Neeraj Chopra (IND)	90.23	Doha, Qatar	16 May 2025

== Schedule ==
The event schedule, in local time (UTC+9), was as follows:

Date	Time	Round
30 May	10:15	Qualification
31 May	17:10	Final

== Results ==
=== Qualification ===
==== Group A ====
Place	Athlete	Nation	#1	#2	#3	Result	Notes
1	Arshad Nadeem	Pakistan	86.34			86.34 m	Q
2	Rumesh Tharanga	Sri Lanka	83.71			83.71 m	Q
3	Ryohei Arai	Japan	77.85			77.85 m	Q, SB
4	Yashvir Singh	India	76.67			76.67 m	Q
5	Nam Tae-poong	South Korea	70.80	76.26		76.26 m	Q, PB
6	Abdulrahman Al-Azemi	Kuwait	72.84	x	70.12	72.84 m	q, PB
7	Artur Gafner	Kazakhstan	70.70	72.66	x	72.66 m	
8	Sarvar Ismaylov	Uzbekistan	x	71.13	71.56	71.56 m	PB
9	Cheng Chao-tsun	Chinese Taipei	67.64	70.10	70.80	70.80 m	
10	Jeong Jun-seok	South Korea	66.91	x	65.04	66.91 m	
11	Chon Weng	Macau	54.94	59.78	59.93	59.93 m	

==== Group B ====
Place	Athlete	Nation	#1	#2	#3	Result	Notes
1	Yuta Sakiyama	Japan	72.85	81.36	-	81.36 m	Q, SB
2	Sumeda Ranasinghe	Sri Lanka	x	81.33	-	81.33 m	Q
3	Sachin Yadav	India	79.62	-	-	79.62 m	Q
4	Muhammad Yasir	Pakistan	76.07	-	-	76.07 m	Q
5	Hu Haoran	China	75.13	75.56	74.54	75.56 m	q
6	Ali Fathi Ganji	Iran	71.38	69.71	73.41	73.41 m	q
7	Asadbek Murodov	Uzbekistan	66.24	66.54	69.65	69.65 m	
8	Kim Dani	South Korea	69.30	66.59	68.03	69.30 m	
9	Abdulaziz Al-Hemdan	Kuwait	x	59.69	64.09	64.09 m	PB
10	Ali Essa Abdelghani	Saudi Arabia	62.50	x	x	62.50 m	
—	Abdul Hafiz	Indonesia	x	x	x	NM	

=== Final ===
Place	Athlete	Nation	#1	#2	#3	#4	#5	#6	Result	Notes
1st place, gold medalist(s)	Arshad Nadeem	Pakistan	75.64	76.80	85.57	83.99	83.44	86.40	86.40 m	
2nd place, silver medalist(s)	Sachin Yadav	India	79.65	74.05	72.07	77.37	83.08	85.16	85.16 m	PB
3rd place, bronze medalist(s)	Yuta Sakiyama	Japan	76.45	74.82	73.25	79.52	79.35	83.75	83.75 m	PB
4	Rumesh Tharanga	Sri Lanka	81.91	82.28	77.14	x	76.51	83.27	83.27 m	
5	Yashvir Singh	India	x	x	77.24	80.23	80.23	82.57	82.57 m	PB
6	Hu Haoran	China	77.51	80.93	78.36	78.77	77.44	78.24	80.93 m	SB
7	Sumeda Ranasinghe	Sri Lanka	79.81	77.82	x	x	x	79.58	79.81 m	
8	Muhammad Yasir	Pakistan	70.53	75.39	74.50	72.92	x	74.78	75.39 m	
9	Ryohei Arai	Japan	69.10	69.85	74.21				74.21 m	
10	Abdulrahman Al-Azemi	Kuwait	70.08	73.87	70.68				73.87 m	PB
11	Ali Fathi Ganji	Iran	72.11	x	x				72.11 m	
12	Nam Tae-poong	South Korea	65.67	63.38	69.42				69.42 m	
