= Sachin Yadav (javelin thrower) =

Indian javelin thrower (born 1999)

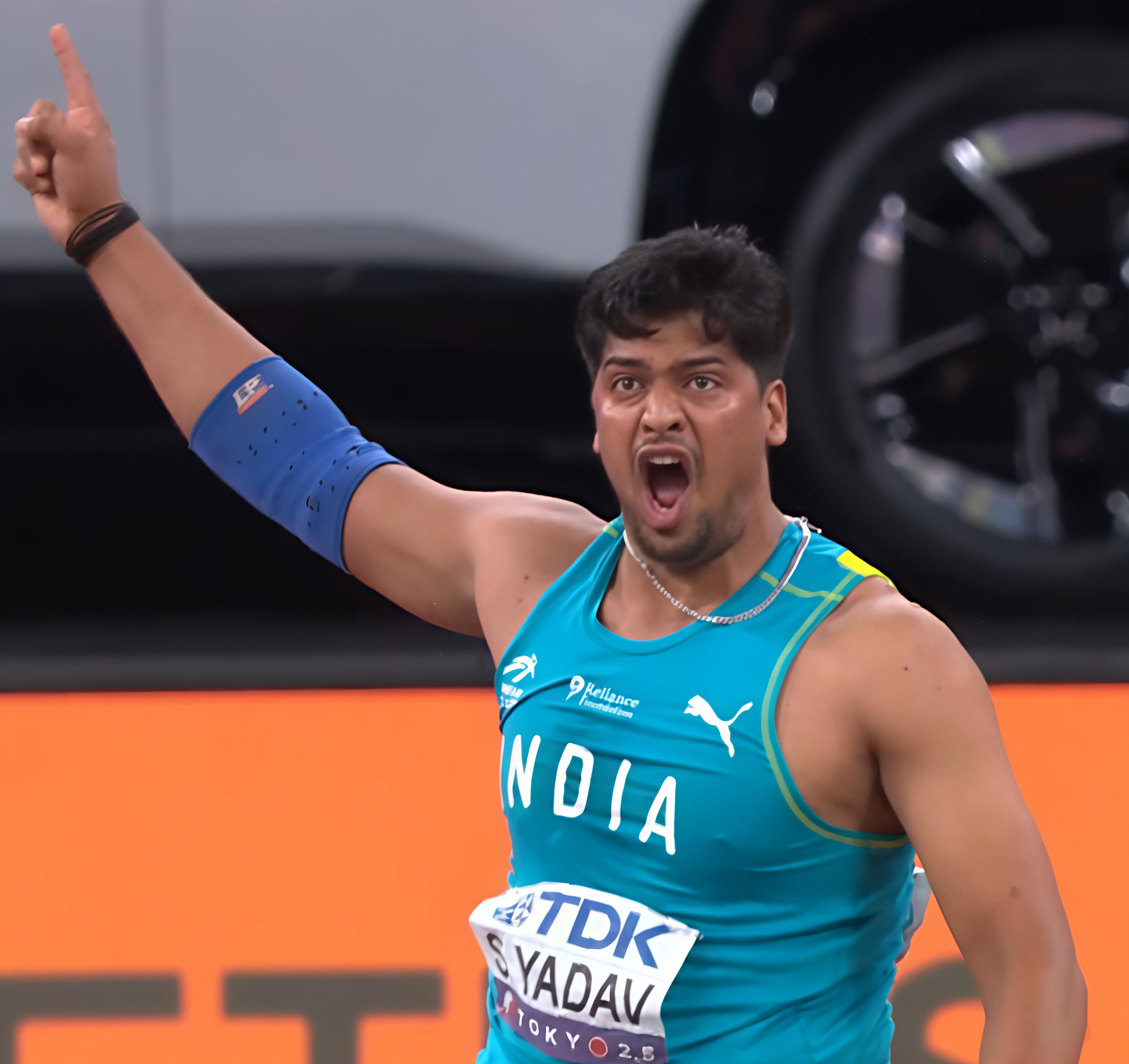
- Yadav at the 2025 World Championships

Personal information
- Born: 25 October 1999 (age 26) Khekada, Uttar Pradesh, India
- Height: 1.96 m (6 ft 5 in)
- Police career
- Department: Uttar Pradesh Police
- Branch: Noida Commissionerate
- Service years: 2024—present
- Rank: Police Constable

Sport
- Sport: Athletics
- Event: Javelin throw
- Coached by: Sergey Makarov

Achievements and titles
- Highest world ranking: 7 (2025)
- Personal best: 86.27 m (2025)
Medal record
Men's athletics
Representing India
Asian Championships
Silver medal – second place	2025 Gumi	Javelin throw

Sachin Yadav (born 25 October 1999) is an Indian javelin thrower. He won the silver medal at the 2025 Asian Championships.

== Early life ==
Sachin Yadav hails from Khekada town in Bagpat district of Uttar Pradesh. Initially passionate about cricket, his athletic potential was recognized by neighbor and athlete Sandeep Yadav, who observed Sachin's strong shoulders during a local cricket match. Under Sandeep's guidance, Sachin transitioned to javelin throw at the age of 19. Standing at 6 feet 5 inches, his physique is considered advantageous for the sport.

== Career ==
=== 2025 ===
In February, he won the gold medal at the 38th National Games, with a personal best and meet record throw of 84.39 m.

Yadav then followed it up with a silver medal at the Asian Championships, with a personal best of 85.16 m, missing the gold medal by just 1.24 m won by the then Olympic gold medalist Arshad Nadeem.

At the inaugural edition of the Neeraj Chopra Classic meet, Yadav narrowly missed the podium, finishing fourth with a throw of 82.33 m.

At the World Championships, he finished ninth in the qualification round with a throw of 83.67 m, and narrowly missed a medal by placing fourth in the finals with a personal best throw of 86.27 m.

=== 2026 ===
Yadav finished a lowly eighth on his Diamond League debut at the 2026 Golden Gala in Rome, with a throw of 79.18 m.

In July, Yadav underwent successful surgery after sustaining complete tears of the ulnar collateral ligament of the elbow and the common flexor origin. The surgery was followed by a six-month rehabilitation period, bringing his season to an early end.

== Performance record ==
=== Tournaments ===
Year	Competition	Venue	Position	Notes
Representing India
2025	Asian Championships	Gumi, South Korea	2nd	85.16 m
2025	World Championships	Tokyo, Japan	4th	86.27 m

=== Invitational meets ===
Year	Tournament	Venue	Position	Result	Ref.
2025	Neeraj Chopra Classic	Bengaluru, India	4th	82.33 m	
2026	Golden Gala	Rome, Italy	8th	79.18 m	
