= 2026 World Athletics Ultimate Championship – Men's javelin throw =

Men's javelin throw at the 2026 World Athletics Ultimate Championship
- Venue: National Athletics Centre
- Location: Budapest, Hungary
- Dates: 13 September 2026 (final)
- Competitors: 8 from 8 nations
- Winning time: 91.09 m

Champion
- Rumesh Pathirage; Sri Lanka

The men's javelin throw was held as a straight final at the 2026 World Athletics Ultimate Championship at the National Athletics Centre in Budapest, Hungary on 13 September 2026. It was the first time the World Ultimate Championship is held. Athletes qualified by wildcard or by their world ranking.

== Background ==
Global records before the 2026 World Athletics Ultimate Championship
Record	Distance	Athlete (nation)	Location	Date
World record	98.48 m	Jan Železný (CZE)	Jena, Germany	25 May 1996
World lead	92.62 m	Rumesh Tharanga (SRI)	Rome, Italy	4 June 2026

Area records before the 2026 World Athletics Ultimate Championship
Record	Distance	Athlete (nation)	Location	Date
African record	92.72 m	Julius Yego (KEN)	Beijing, China	26 August 2015
Asian record	92.97 m	Arshad Nadeem (PAK)	Paris, France	8 August 2024
European record	98.48 m	Jan Železný (CZE)	Jena, Germany	25 May 1996
North, Central American, and Caribbean record	93.07 m	Anderson Peters (GRN)	Doha, Qatar	13 May 2022
Oceanian record	89.02 m	Jarrod Bannister (AUS)	Brisbane, Australia	29 February 2008
South American record	91.00 m	Luiz Maurício da Silva (BRA)	São Paulo, Brazil	3 August 2025

== Qualification ==
For the javelin throw, eight athletes qualified, up to three by wildcard for winners of the event at the 2024 Summer Olympic, the 2025 World Athletics Championships, or the 2026 Diamond League final and the others by their position at the World Athletics Rankings for the event on 3 September 2026.

== Results ==
=== Final ===
The final was held on 13 September at 18:13 (UTC+2).

Place	Athlete	Nation	Round				Result	Notes
Place	Athlete	Nation	#1	#2	#3	#4	Result	Notes
1st place, gold medalist(s)	Rumesh Pathirage	Sri Lanka	75.89	85.69	87.11	91.09	91.09 m	
2	Anderson Peters	Grenada	80.18	86.18	84.15	82.63	86.18 m	
3	Julian Weber	Germany	84.09	85.89	78.84	78.75	85.89 m	
4	Keshorn Walcott	Trinidad and Tobago	76.44	82.41	81.97	x	82.41 m	
5	Arshad Nadeem	Pakistan	74.42	79.66	81.49		81.49 m	SB
6	Julius Yego	Kenya	79.76	x	80.23		80.23 m	
7	Dawid Wegner	Poland	72.51	77.21			77.21 m	
8	Curtis Thompson	United States	74.40	75.80			75.80 m	
