= Rumesh Tharanga =

Sri Lankan javelin thrower (born 2003)

Rumesh Pathirage
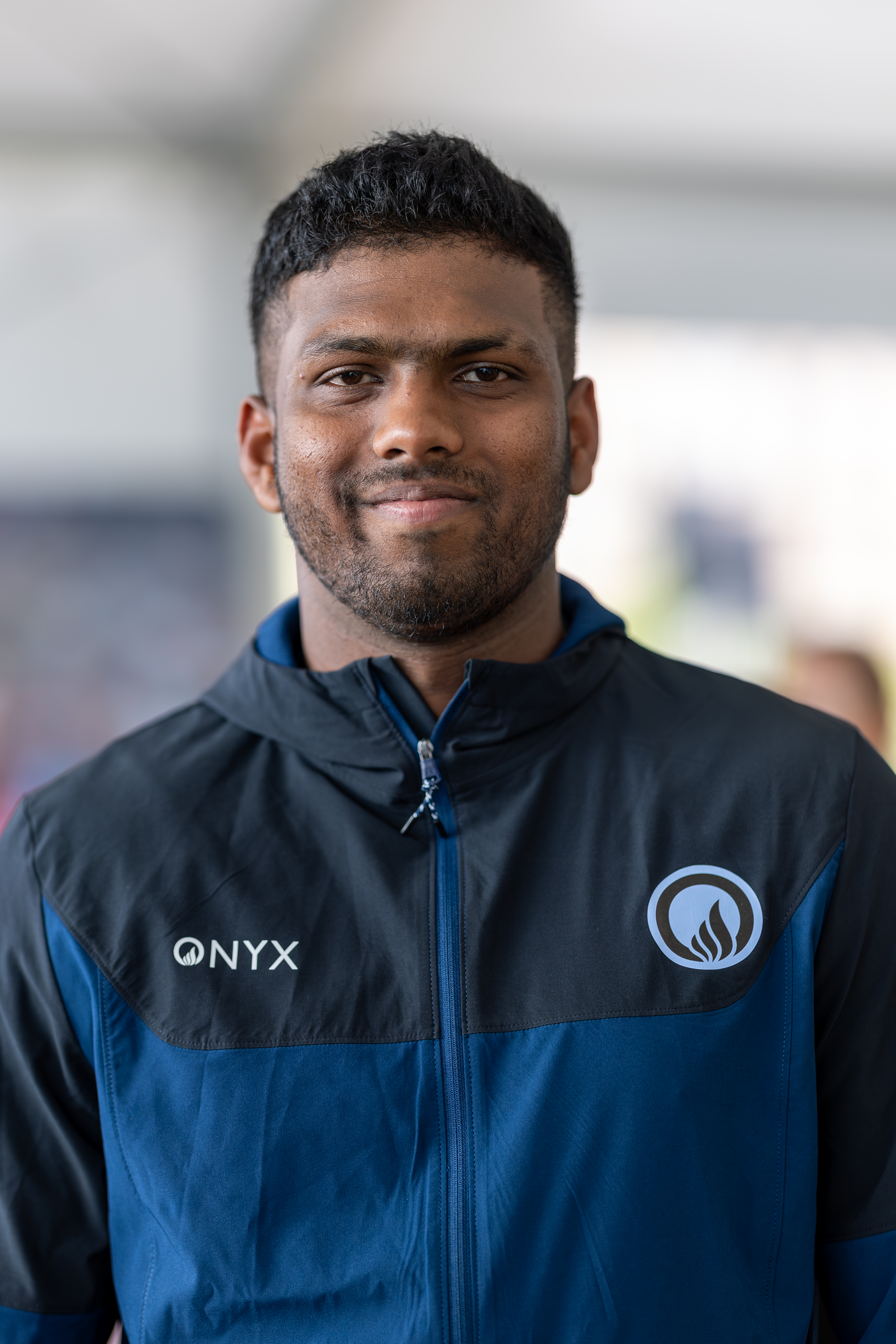
- Rumesh in 2026

Personal information
- Full name: Rumesh Tharanga Pathirage
- Born: 21 March 2003 (age 23) Kalutara, Sri Lanka
- Years active: 2017–present
- Military career
- Allegiance: Sri Lanka
- Branch: Sri Lanka Air Force
- Service years: 2024–present
- Rank: Sergeant

Sport
- Country: Sri Lanka
- Sport: Athletics
- Event: Javelin throw

Achievements and titles
- World finals: (gold) 2026
- Regional finals: (gold) 2024 (gold) 2025 (gold) 2025 (gold) 2026
- National finals: (gold) 2025
- Commonwealth finals: (gold) 2026
- Highest world ranking: 1 (2026)
- Personal bests: 92.62 m NR (2026)
Medal record
Men's athletics
Representing Sri Lanka
Event	1st	2nd	3rd
World Ultimate Championship	1	0	0
Diamond League	1	0	0
Asian Games	1	0	0
Commonwealth Games	1	0	0
South Asian Championships	1	0	0
Asian Throwing Championships	2	0	0
Total	7	0	0
World Ultimate Championship
First place	2026 Budapest	Javelin throw
Diamond League
First place	2026 Brussels	Javelin throw
Asian Games
Gold medal – first place	2026 Aichi–Nagoya	Javelin throw
Commonwealth Games
Gold medal – first place	2026 Glasgow	Javelin throw
South Asian Championships
Gold medal – first place	2025 Ranchi	Javelin throw
Asian Throwing Championships
Gold medal – first place	2024 Mokpo	Javelin throw
Gold medal – first place	2025 Mokpo	Javelin throw

Rumesh Tharanga Pathirage (born 21 March 2003) is a Sri Lankan javelin thrower. He has won gold medals at the 2026 Asian Games and 2026 Commonwealth Games, and the 2026 World Ultimate Championship and 2026 Diamond League titles.

== Early life ==
Rumesh was born on 21 March 2003 in Kalutara, Sri Lanka. Initially interested in cricket, as a teenager, he bowled at speeds of up to 134 km/h while representing the St. Peter's College, Colombo. His father, who was a discus and shot-put thrower, introduced him to athletics. He initially took up discus throw before switching to javelin throw in 2017.

== Career ==
Rumesh made his international debut at the 2019 Asian Youth Championships in Hong Kong, where he finished sixth with a throw of 61.62 m. Later at the 2022 World U20 Championships in Cali, he placed seventh with a 69.98 m throw.

He began to be coached in Australia under Mike and Kelsey Barber at the Queensland Institute of Sport. He won the 2024 Asian Throwing Championships in Mokpo, with a personal best of 85.45 m.

In March 2025, he threw 85.41 m to win the Perth Track Classic. He placed fourth at the 2025 Asian Championships in Gumi, with a throw of 83.37 m. In July, he won the bronze medal at the Neeraj Chopra Classic in Bengaluru with a throw of 84.34 m. In August, he became the Sri Lankan National champion in with a throw of 82.40 m in Diyagama. That month, he set a new Sri Lankan national record with a throw of 86.50 m whilst competing at the 2025 Indian Open, a WACT Bronze meet in Bhubaneswar, to break the previous best mark set by Sumeda Ranasinghe. He also retained his title at the 2025 Asian Throwing Championships in Mokpo, with a throw of 82.05 m. At the 2025 World Championships, he finished 12th in the qualification round with a throw of 82.80 m and became the first-ever Sri Lankan javelin thrower to qualify for the finals, where he placed seventh with a throw of 84.38 m.

On 14 February 2026, he threw 83.07 m to retain his title at the Perth Track Classic. The following month, he set a new national record with a throw of 89.37 m at the Champions Track & Field Meet in Diyagama. On 24 April, he set a new meeting record of 89.28 m at the Kip Keino Classic. On 31 May, he threw 85.97 m to finish runner-up at the 2026 Meeting de Rabat. It would prove to be his only defeat of the season. On 4 June, he won with a throw of 92.62 m at the 2026 Golden Gala. It was the furthest throw anywhere in the world since the 2024 Olympics, and moved him to eighth on the world all-time list. This performance sets a new meet record, national record, and world-leading mark for the season to date, as well as a personal best. On 16 June, he threw 86.57 m to win at the Golden Spike Ostrava, and on 19 June threw 88.68 m to win at the 2026 Doha Diamond League. On 31 July, he won the gold medal at the 2026 Commonwealth Games with a throw of 89.75 m. Competing at the 2026 Athletissima on 21 August, he won with his throw of 88.14 m to beat Neeraj Chopra by nine centimetres. On 27 August, he threw 92.07 m to win the 2026 Weltklasse Zürich. On 5 September, he won the 2026 Memorial Van Damme with a third-attempt throw of 89.04 m, becoming the first Sri Lankan athlete to win a Diamond League final. It was his twelfth victory in thirteen events. On 13 September, he won the inaugural World Ultimate Championship title in Budapest, with a throw of 91.09 m– the first 90 m throw ever achieved in Hungary. He received a special trophy and a prize money of USD 150,000. On 28 September, he concluded his season by winning the gold medal at the 2026 Asian Games in Nagoya with a best throw of 88.55 m.

== Performance record ==
=== Tournaments ===
Representing Sri Lanka
Year	Competition	Host	Position	Result
2019	Asian Youth Championships	Hong Kong, China	6th	61.62 m
2022	World U20 Championships	Cali, Colombia	7th	69.98 m
2024	Asian Throwing Championships	Mokpo, South Korea	1st	85.45 m
2025	Asian Championships	Gumi, South Korea	4th	83.27 m
2025	Asian Throwing Championships	Mokpo, South Korea	1st	82.05 m
2025	World Championships	Tokyo, Japan	7th	84.38 m
2025	South Asian Championships	Ranchi, India	1st	84.29 m
2026	Commonwealth Games	Glasgow, Scotland	1st	89.75 m
2026	World Ultimate Championship	Budapest, Hungary	1st	91.09 m
2026	Asian Games	Nagoya, Japan	1st	88.55 m

=== Diamond League ===
Year	Meeting	Round	Position	Result
2026	Meeting de Rabat	Qualification	2nd	85.97 m
2026	Golden Gala	Qualification	1st	92.62 m
2026	Doha Diamond League	Qualification	1st	88.68 m
2026	Athletissima	Qualification	1st	88.14 m
2026	Weltklasse Zürich	Qualification	1st	92.07 m
2026	Memorial Van Damme	Final	Winner	89.04 m

=== Invitational meets ===
Year	Tournament	Venue	Position	Result
2025	Perth Track Classic	Perth, Australia	1st	85.41 m
2025	Sydney Track Classic	Sydney, Australia	1st	77.86 m
2025	Neeraj Chopra Classic	Bengaluru, India	3rd	84.34 m
2025	Indian Open	Bhubaneswar, India	1st	86.50 m
2026	Perth Track Classic	Perth, Australia	1st	83.07 m
2026	Hobart Track Classic	Hobart, Australia	1st	80.12 m
2026	Kip Keino Classic	Nairobi, Kenya	1st	89.28 m
2026	Golden Spike Ostrava	Ostrava, Czech Republic	1st	86.57 m

=== Seasonal bests ===
Year	Performance	Place	Date
2021	68.33 m	Colombo, Sri Lanka	27 July
2022	70.68 m	Cali, Colombia	4 August
2023	76.45 m	Colombo, Sri Lanka	24 August
2024	85.45 m	Mokpo, South Korea	15 June
2025	86.50 m	Bhubaneswar, India	10 August
2026	92.62 m	Rome, Italy	04 June

Source: World Athletics

== Military career ==
Following his gold medal victory at the 2026 Commonwealth Games, Rumesh was promoted to the rank of Sergeant on 5 August 2026 by Sri Lanka Air Force Commander Air Marshal Bandu Edirisinghe.
