= Athletics at the 2026 Asian Games – Men's javelin throw =

Men's javelin throw at the 2026 Asian Games
- Venue: Mizuho Park Athletic Stadium, Nagoya
- Date: 28 September 2026
- Competitors: 14 from 9 nations
- Winning distance: 88.55 m

Medalists
gold medal	Rumesh Pathirage	Sri Lanka
silver medal	Yashvir Singh	India
bronze medal	Rohit Yadav	India

The men's javelin throw competition at the 2026 Asian Games took place on 28 September 2026 at the Mizuho Park Athletic Stadium in Nagoya, Japan. Rumesh Pathirage of Sri Lanka won the gold medal, Yashvir Singh of India won the silver and Rohit Yadav of India won the bronze.

== Schedule ==
All times are Japan Standard Time (UTC+09:00)

Schedule
Date	Time	Event
28 September 2026	16:45	Final

== Records ==
Prior to this competition, the existing world, Asian and Games records were as follows.

World Record	Jan Železný (CZE)	98.48	Jena, Germany	24 May 1996
Asian Record	Arshad Nadeem (PAK)	92.97	Paris, France	7 August 2024
Games Record	Zhao Qinggang (CHN)	89.15	Incheon, South Korea	1 October 2014

== Results ==
Rank	Athlete	Attempt						Result	Notes
Rank	Athlete	1	2	3	4	5	6	Result	Notes
1st place, gold medalist(s)	Rumesh Pathirage (SRI)	73.53	83.34	X	88.33	X	88.55	88.55	
2nd place, silver medalist(s)	Yashvir Singh (IND)	83.56	82.99	82.42	84.31	85.14	85.72	85.72	PB
3rd place, bronze medalist(s)	Rohit Yadav (IND)	77.25	82.40	84.35	82.16	82.15	X	84.35	
4	Arshad Nadeem (PAK)	76.69	X	80.29	X	X	X	80.29	SB
5	Yuta Sakiyama (JPN)	69.18	69.21	78.74	r			78.74	
6	Sumedha Ranasinghe (SRI)	75.07	78.08	X	X	76.67	78.06	78.08	
7	Sarvar Ismoilov (UZB)	74.38	75.80	74.66	X	X	X	75.80	
8	Nam Tae-poong (KOR)	70.40	69.88	75.10	X	63.70	70.55	75.10	
9	Muhammad Yasir (PAK)	X	73.50	73.47	73.50			73.50	
10	Rin Suzuki (JPN)	68.57	71.73	68.13	71.73			71.73	
11	Alexey Khlystov (KAZ)	70.87	70.29	62.36	70.87			70.87	
12	Abd Hafiz (INA)	X	70.67	69.19	70.67			70.67	SB
13	Abdulrahman Alazemi (KUW)	60.50	63.76	61.93	63.76			63.76	
—	Silfanus Ndiken (INA)	X	X	X				NM	
