= Khekada =

Coordinates: 9.2167°N 1.8500°W

- Town
- Khekra
- Interactive map of Khekada
- Country: India
- State: Uttar Pradesh
- District: Baghpat
- Established: 1884

Government
  - Type: UP Gov
  - Body: NPP

Population (2011)
  - Total: 40,000
  - Density: 50,000/km^{2} (130,000/sq mi)

Languages
  - Official: Hindi
  - Additional official: Urdu
- Time zone: UTC+5:30 (IST)
- Postal code: 250101
- Vehicle registration: UP17
- Website: www.nppkhekra.com

Khekada (also spelled as Khekra) is a town in the National Capital Region and sub-district headquarters of Baghpat district in the Indian state of Uttar Pradesh.

== Demographics ==
At the 2001 Census of India, Khekada had a population of nearly 40,000. Males constituted 54% of the population and females 46%. Khekada had an average literacy rate of 62%, higher than the national average of 59.5%: male literacy was 70% and female literacy was 52%. In Khekada, 16% of the population were under 6 years of age.

== Administration ==
=== Villages ===
- Bada Gaon
- Bandpur
- Nangla Badi
- Noorpur Muzbida Harsana
- Rataul

Religions in Khekada
Religion	Percent
Hindus	67%
Muslims	32%
Christians	0.2%
Others†	2.8%
Distribution of religions †Includes Sikhs (0.2%), Buddhists (<0.2%).

== Notable people ==
- Ankur Dhama, Indian para-athlete and long-distance runner.
- Sachin Yadav, Indian athlete.
