= Khandra, Panipat =

Khandra
- Location within Haryana Location within India
- Coordinates: 29°25′46″N 76°50′39″E
- Country: India
- State: Haryana
- District: Panipat
- Tehsil: Madlauda

Government
  - Type: Gram panchayat
  - Body: Gram sabha

Population (2011)
  - Total: 2,153

Languages Hindi/Haryanvi
- Time zone: UTC+5:30 (IST)
- PIN: 132113

Khandra is a village in Madlauda tehsil, Panipat sub-district, Panipat district of the Indian state of Haryana. The Pin code of Khandra is 132113.

== Demographics ==
According to the 2011 Census of India, Khandra's population was 2,153 persons, with 1,181 persons amongst those being male and 972 being female.

== Government and politics ==
Khandra is administered by the Khandra gram panchayat.

== Ecology ==
In 2020, special joint action committee constituted under the auspices of the National Green Tribunal to investigate air and water pollution resulting from the activities of the Panipat Refinery. 31 sample sites were chosen for collection of samples of ground water within a radius of 10 km from the refinery. Government school, Khandra was one of them. It was found that the sample collected there contained 0.36 mg/L of fluoride. On the basis of the recommendations of the committee, the refinery was ordered, by the tribunal, to pay a compensation of Rs. 642 crore to those adversely affected by its activities.

== Notable people ==
- Neeraj Chopra: Olympic, Commonwealth, Asian Games and World Championship gold medalist in Javelin throw.
