= Rataul =

- Nagar Panchayat
- Location within Uttar Pradesh Location within India
- Coordinates: 28°50′N 77°21′E
- Country: India
- State: Uttar Pradesh
- District: Baghpat
- Tehsil: Khekra

Rataul is a town and a nagar panchayat located in the Khekra tehsil, in the Baghpat district, Uttar Pradesh state, India. It is 25 km (16 mi) from the Indian capital of Delhi, and also 7 km (4.3 mi) from Loni.

== History ==
In colonial times, the local area judiciary court operated in Rataul. Many of its people were active in the Indian Freedom Movements, and some Rataulis took part in Khilafat Movement.

== Agriculture ==
More than 200 varieties of mangoes, including the Rataul Mango, have been grown in Rataul since about 1900 CE, and many are exported around the world. These have been awarded the "king of mangoes" international award many times.
