= Anwar Ratol =

Variety of mango

"Mangifera" 'Anwar Ratol"
- Genus: Mangifera
- Species: Mangifera indica
- Cultivar: "Anwar Ratol"
- Origin: Rataul, Uttar Pradesh, India

Anwar Ratol (sometimes spelt Anwar Rataul) is a small, yellow variety of mango known for its sweetness and fiberlessness. It is sometimes called the 'mini powerhouse'. It is cultivated in the Punjab and Sindh regions of Pakistan, and near the village of Rataul in Uttar Pradesh, India. It is very sweet in taste with less fiber.

== History ==
Anwar Ratol was first cultivated near Rataul, a village in Uttar Pradesh. Sheikh Mohd Afaq Faridi, a Muslim farmer returned to the village after completing his inter college in 1905, he noticed a young mango tree near one of the farms. He asked a gardener to graft the plant, and in a year's time, four mango trees sprouted. Years later, Afaq Faridi resigned from his job and devoted his life to this ‘sweet mission’. After his marriage, he set up a mango nursery that he called Shohra-e-afaq in 1928 and got it registered in 1935. Through grafting and cultivation, he nurtured this variety and later named it Anwar Rataul in honor of a family member. In 1947 after partition, a family member took sample plants to Pakistan and planted this mango breed in the Multan region. The variety became famous, and symbol of pride for Pakistan.

== Variations ==
There are two variations of this mango:

The early season variety is fragile and prone to the climate elements. Much of the crop is destroyed by strong wind and heavy rain, but it is also the most popular and sweeter of the two varieties. Its growing season is very short - just a few weeks in May and June.

The late season variety is more stable, with a thicker skin and is less sweet. It grows in July and August.

== "Mango diplomacy" ==
Since 1981, Pakistan has been sending Anwar Ratol mangoes to heads of state and diplomats as part of its "mango diplomacy" to promote their mangoes around the world and create better relations with other countries like Australia and India.

== Geographical indication ==
It was awarded the Geographical Indication (GI) status tag from the Geographical Indications Registry under the Union Government of India on 14 September 2021 (valid until 4 April 2030).

Rataul Mango Producers Association from Rataul proposed the GI registration of the Rataul Mango. After filing the application in 2010, the fruit was granted the GI tag in 2021 by the Geographical Indication Registry in Chennai, making the name "Rataul Mango" exclusive to the mangoes grown in the region. It thus became the second mango variety from Uttar Pradesh after Malihabadi Dussheri Mango and the 34th type of goods from Uttar Pradesh to earn the GI tag.

== See also ==
- List of mango cultivars
- List of Geographical Indications in India
