= Nangla Badi =

- Village
- Location within Uttar Pradesh Location within India
- Coordinates: 28°50′N 77°21′E
- Country: India
- State: Uttar Pradesh
- District: Baghpat
- Tehsil: Khekra

Nangla Badi is a village located in the Khekra tehsil, Baghpat district in the Indian state of Uttar Pradesh. It is a rapidly developing village near Delhi. According to the historians, the ancestors of this village had participated actively in famous 1857 Revolutionary revolt. It is a JAATs dominated village of DAGAR clan. It is a JAATs dominated village of sindhu clan. Nangla Badi Pin code is 250101. Khadi Hindi is the most speaking language. Agriculture is the main occupation of villager, besides this many are serving in Indiana army, Air Force, para military forces, Doctors and Delhi & UP police.

== Geography ==
It is 12 km (7.5 mi) from the Indian capital of Delhi, and 6 km (3.7 mi) from Loni. Nangla Badi's pin code is 250101. Postal head office is in Rly, Road Khekra .

== History ==
The village is divided into four Mohallas, each established by one of four founders who were active participants in the 1857 revolution.

== Economy ==
Agriculture is the primary occupation. Villagers also serve in the Indian Army, Indian Air Force, Para Military Forces, Delhi police and Uttar Pradesh police.

== Demographics ==
Nangla Badi has 2,380 residents with a literacy rate of 61.5%. Its population is 46.0% female. It is Jat dominant with members of the Dagar clan who speak Khadi Hindi.
