= Arshad Nadeem =

Pakistani javelin thrower (born 1997)

Arshad Nadeem PP HI OLY
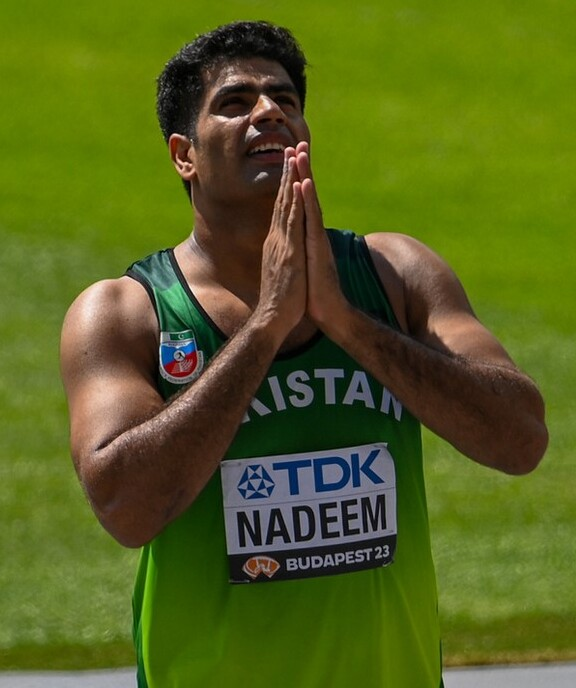
- Nadeem at the 2023 World Championships

Personal information
- Native name: ارشد ندیم
- Born: 2 January 1997 (age 29) Mian Channu, Punjab, Pakistan
- Employer: WAPDA
- Height: 1.92 m (6 ft 4 in)
- Weight: 95 kg (209 lb)

Sport
- Sport: Track and field
- Event: Javelin throw
- Coached by: Salman Iqbal Butt Terseus Liebenberg

Achievements and titles
- Olympic finals: (gold) 2024
- World finals: (silver) 2023
- Regional finals: (gold) 2025 (gold) 2019 (bronze) 2018 (bronze) 2016
- Commonwealth finals: (gold) 2022
- Highest world ranking: 4 (June 2025)
- Personal bests: 92.97 m OR AR (2024)
Medal record
Men's athletics
Representing Pakistan
| Event | 1st | 2nd | 3rd |
|---|---|---|---|
| Olympic Games | 1 | 0 | 0 |
| World Championships | 0 | 1 | 0 |
| Commonwealth Games | 1 | 0 | 0 |
| Asian Games | 0 | 0 | 1 |
| Asian Championships | 1 | 0 | 0 |
| South Asian Games | 1 | 0 | 1 |
| Islamic Solidarity Games | 2 | 0 | 1 |
| Asian U20 Championships | 0 | 0 | 1 |
| Total | 6 | 1 | 4 |
Olympic Games
| Gold medal – first place | 2024 Paris | Javelin throw |
World Championships
| Silver medal – second place | 2023 Budapest | Javelin throw |
Commonwealth Games
| Gold medal – first place | 2022 Birmingham | Javelin throw |
Asian Games
| Bronze medal – third place | 2018 Jakarta | Javelin throw |
Asian Championships
| Gold medal – first place | 2025 Gumi | Javelin throw |
South Asian Games
| Gold medal – first place | 2019 Kathmandu | Javelin throw |
| Bronze medal – third place | 2016 Guwahati | Javelin throw |
Islamic Solidarity Games
| Gold medal – first place | 2021 Konya | Javelin throw |
| Gold medal – first place | 2025 Riyadh | Javelin throw |
| Bronze medal – third place | 2017 Baku | Javelin throw |
Asian U20 Championships
| Bronze medal – third place | 2016 Ho Chi Minh City | Javelin throw |

Arshad Nadeem PP HI (Punjabi / Urdu: ارشد ندیم; Punjabi pronunciation: [ˈɐrʃɐd nəˈdiːm]; born 2 January 1997) is a Pakistani javelin thrower. He is the reigning Olympic and Asian Athletics champion. His 92.97 metres (305.0 ft) throw at the 2024 Paris Olympics is an Olympic and Asian record, and it's also the sixth longest throw in the history of javelin throw, when considering only the best throw from each athlete.

He is a two-time Olympian, the first Pakistani track and field athlete to earn direct qualification for the Olympics under modern entry standards, and the first Pakistani athlete to reach the final of any event at the World Championships. He represents WAPDA in the National Games of Pakistan.

At the 2022 Commonwealth Games, he set a new national and Commonwealth Games record with a throw of 90.18 m (295.9 ft) and became the first South Asian athlete to breach the 90 m mark. At the 2023 World Championships, he became the first Pakistani athlete to win a medal at the World Athletics Championships, securing a silver medal. At the 2024 Summer Olympics, he became the first Pakistani to win an Olympic medal in athletics and the country's first individual Olympic gold medalist.

== Early life ==
Nadeem was born into a Punjabi Muslim Rajput family in Mian Channu, in the Punjab province of Pakistan. He is the third-oldest among eight siblings. Nadeem was an exceptionally versatile athlete from his early school years. Though he dabbled in all the sports on offer in his school — cricket, badminton, football and athletics — his passion was cricket, and he soon found himself playing in district-level tape-ball tournaments. Upon entering grade seven in school, Nadeem caught the eye of Rasheed Ahmad Saqi during an athletics competition. Saqi had a history of developing sportspeople in the division, and began training Nadeem soon afterwards.

Before settling on javelin throw, Nadeem also pursued shot put and discus throw. Gold medals in the javelin throw in successive Punjab Youth Festivals and an inter-board meet propelled him onto the national stage, bringing offers from all the leading domestic departmental teams, including the athletics sections of the Pakistan Army, Air Force and Water and Power Development Authority (WAPDA). It was his father, Muhammad Ashraf, who persuaded him to take up the sport of javelin throwing. Nadeem actually aspired to become a full-time cricketer, but he changed his mind and shifted his focus to athletics as he first picked up the javelin in 2015; Nadeem himself acknowledged that it was "the best thing that happened" to him.

== Career ==
=== Early years (2015–2019) ===
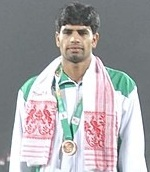
Nadeem at the 2016 South Asian Games in Guwahati

Nadeem started competing in javelin competitions in 2015. In 2016, he received a scholarship from World Athletics, which made him eligible to train at the IAAF High Performance Training Centre in Mauritius.

In February 2016, Nadeem won the bronze medal at the 12th South Asian Games in Guwahati, India, setting a national record and his personal best at 78.33 m.

In June 2016, Nadeem won the bronze medal at the 17th Asian Junior Athletics Championship, held in Ho Chi Minh City.

In May 2017, Nadeem won a bronze medal with a throw of 76.33 m at the 4th Islamic Solidarity Games in Baku. In April 2018, he set a new personal best of 80.45 m in the qualification round of the Commonwealth Games, held in Gold Coast, Australia, and finished eighth. He also sustained a back injury following the end of 2018 Commonwealth Games. In August 2018, he won a bronze medal at the Asian Games in Jakarta, Indonesia, where he set a new personal best and national record of 80.75 m. Arshad's 2018 Asian Games bronze was Pakistan's first athletics medal in 24 years at the Asian Games since Aqarab Abbas's hammer throw bronze in 1994.

As the only Pakistani athlete at the 2019 World Athletics Championships in Doha, Qatar, Nadeem achieved a new personal best and national record of 81.52 m. In November 2019, Nadeem broke the national record again when he recorded an 83.65 m throw to win gold for WAPDA at the 33rd National Games in Peshawar. In December 2019, he won a gold medal with an 86.29 m games record throw at the 13th South Asian Games in Nepal, booking an automatic place in the Tokyo Olympics.

=== Olympics and international success (2021–2025) ===
==== 2021 ====
In 2021, Nadeem bagged a gold medal in the Javelin throw event at the inaugural Imam Reza Athletics Cup in Mashhad, Iran. He registered his personal best and broke the national record with a 86.38 m throw.

==== Tokyo Olympics ====
In 2021, Nadeem made his debut at the Olympics, representing Pakistan at the 2020 Summer Olympics, which were held in Tokyo. He became the first Pakistani track and field athlete to earn direct qualification for the Olympics under modern entry standards. His father stated that Nadeem was not provided with a good training ground facility prior to competing at the Olympics. Nadeem trained in his home's courtyard and on the streets, and is believed to have not received any financial assistance from the Government of Pakistan after qualifying for the Tokyo Olympics. Nadeem has openly spoken about the extreme difficulties of non-cricket sportspeople in Pakistan, who are largely ignored and neglected by sports officials.

On 4 August 2021, he qualified for the men's javelin throw event final of the 2020 Tokyo Olympics. He became the third Pakistani to compete in an Olympic athletics final, following javelin thrower Muhammad Nawaz at the 1956 Melbourne Olympics and hammer thrower Muhammad Iqbal at the 1956 and 1960 Rome Olympics. Nadeem finished fifth in the men's javelin throw with a throw of 84.62 m.

==== 2022 ====
From March 2022, until the start of the world championships, Nadeem trained in South Africa under the supervision of coach Terseus Liebenberg. The training was arranged by the Athletics Federation of Pakistan (AFP).

In July 2022, Nadeem participated in the World Athletics Championships in Eugene, Oregon, US, as the sole representative from Pakistan. He became the first Pakistani athlete to reach the final of any event at the World Championships. He finished fifth in the final with a throw of 86.16 m.

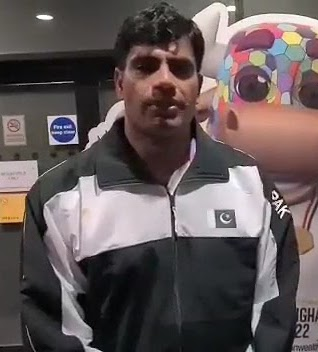
Nadeem at the 2022 Commonwealth Games

On 7 August 2022, Nadeem won a gold medal for Pakistan at the 2022 Commonwealth Games. Despite being injured, he set a games record with his throw of 90.18 m on his fifth attempt, surpassing world champion Anderson Peters's 88.64 m, and becoming the first South Asian to surpass the 90 m mark. This was Pakistan's first athletics gold medal at the Commonwealth Games since 1962.

Five days later, on 12 August 2022, Nadeem won another gold medal for Pakistan at the 2021 Islamic Solidarity Games. He broke the games record with his throw of 88.55 m.

In November 2022, Nadeem won the gold medal in the javelin throw, with a toss of 81.21 m, at the 50th National Athletics Championship in Lahore.

Nadeem left for the UK on 1 December 2022 to get treatment on his injured elbow and knee joint. The AFP arranged for him to be treated at Spire Cambridge Lea Hospital. After a ten-day rehabilitation and physiotherapy period, full recovery took a further four to six weeks.

==== 2023 ====
In May 2023, Nadeem participated in the 34th National Games of Pakistan and won a gold medal with the longest throw of 78.02 m during his third attempt, while representing WAPDA. However, he suffered a knee injury, which ruled him out of the 2023 Asian Athletics Championships. AFP president Akram Sahi blamed WAPDA for forcing Nadeem to participate in the National Games. Arshad received treatment for his injured elbow and knee injuries throughout 2023 by Dr. Ali Bajwa with support by Rizwan Aftab Ahmed.

Nadeem won a silver medal at the 2023 World Athletics Championships in Budapest with a throw of 87.82 m. This was Pakistan's first ever medal at the World Athletics Championships. He also secured qualification for the 2024 Summer Olympics during the event.

==== 2024 ====
In July 2024, Nadeem finished in fourth place at the Paris Diamond League with a 84.21 m throw on his fifth attempt. He became the first Pakistani athlete to compete at the Diamond League. This event also marked his return to the international stage since August 2023, following a prolonged absence due to a knee injury that also sidelined him from the 2022 Asian Games.

==== Paris Olympics ====
At the 2024 Summer Olympics in Paris, Nadeem became the first Pakistani to win an Olympic medal in Athletics. He is also the first Pakistani athlete to win an Olympic gold medal for an individual sport. He not only claimed the men's javelin throw title but set a new Olympic and Asian record of 92.97 m in the final. The previous Olympic record holder was Norwegian Andreas Thorkildsen, who achieved 90.57 m at the 2008 Beijing Olympics. Nadeem's throw is the sixth-longest throw ever, when considering only the best throw from each athlete. Nadeem won Pakistan's first Olympic medal since 1992, and their first Olympic gold medal since 1984. Prior to the 2024 Olympics, Nadeem was considered as an underdog by many critics. His throw of 92.97 m was also confirmed by officials as the longest throw in the world by any male javelin thrower in the 2024 season. He was only the fourth athlete to breach the 90 m mark in the javelin final in the history of Olympics, a feat he achieved twice, in his second and final throw.

On 11 August 2024, Nadeem was honoured with a parade in Lahore.

==== 2025 ====
Nadeem threw 86.40 m to win gold medal in the men's javelin final at the Asian Championships in Gumi, South Korea, on 31 May 2025. He became the first Pakistani since 1973 to win a gold medal at the Asian Athletics Championships.

After suffering partial muscle damage in his right calf, Nadeem underwent surgery in Cambridge, UK in July 2025, followed by intense rehab under Dr. Ali Bajwa. In the final of the World Athletics Championships in Tokyo, despite being declared fully fit, his best throw was 82.75 m, which earned him 10th place overall.

In November 2025, Nadeem successfully defended his men's javelin throw title at the 2025 Islamic Solidarity Games in Riyadh, winning gold with a best effort of 83.05 m. He was the only athlete in the final to exceed 80 m. His compatriot, Muhammad Yasir, claimed silver with a throw of 76.04 m, giving Pakistan a 1–2 finish. Despite recovering from calf surgery earlier in the year, Nadeem expressed gratitude for returning to form.

In December 2025, Arshad Nadeem defended his national title by winning the men's javelin throw gold at the 35th National Games of Pakistan in Karachi, with a best throw of 81.81 m while representing WAPDA. At the opening ceremony, he had the honour of carrying the national flag as flag-bearer and delivered a ceremonial javelin throw.

=== Struggles (2026-present) ===
Arshad Nadeem opened his 2026 season with a ninth-place finish at the Spitzen Leichtathletik Luzern meet, recording a best throw of 78.47 m.

At the 2026 Commonwealth Games, he was the country's flag-bearer during the opening ceremony. Nadeem qualified for the men's javelin throw final at the Commonwealth Games with a season-best throw of 78.63 metres in his opening attempt. However, he failed to defend his title finishing ninth at the Games with a best throw of 77.41 m in the final.

At the inaugural 2026 World Athletics Ultimate Championship in Budapest, he finished fifth with a season best effort of 81.49 m. At the 2026 Asian Games in Nagoya, he finished fourth in the men's javelin final with a best throw of 80.29 m, ending his season without a single podium finish. He also withdrew from the 54th National Athletics Championship in Karachi on 23 October 2026 after feeling unwell.

== Personal life ==
Nadeem is married and has a daughter and a son. He is a devout Muslim.

Nadeem describes himself as an introvert. His coach, Salman Iqbal Butt, a former national-level discus thrower, remembered him as a very respectful and obedient athlete who bowed his head as he listened to his coach's words. "He is Zen-like. He is quiet. He is focused, and no matter the setback, he does not let it linger. This is one of the most incredible things about Nadeem, and you cannot really teach it either," his coach said.

== International competitions ==
AR–Area Record
OR–Olympic Record
NR−National record
GR−Games record
q−Qualification round
SB− Season's best

Representing Pakistan
| Year | Competition | Venue | Position | Event | Notes |
|---|---|---|---|---|---|
| 2016 | South Asian Games | Guwahati, India | 3rd | Javelin throw | 78.33 m |
| 2016 | Asian U20 Championships | Ho Chi Minh City, Vietnam | 3rd | Javelin throw | 73.40 m |
| 2016 | World U20 Championships | Bydgoszcz, Poland | 30th (q) | Javelin throw | 67.17 m |
| 2017 | Islamic Solidarity Games | Baku, Azerbaijan | 3rd | Javelin throw | 76.33 m |
| 2017 | Asian Championships | Bhubaneswar, India | 7th | Javelin throw | 78.00 m |
| 2018 | Commonwealth Games | Gold Coast, Australia | 8th | Javelin throw | 76.02 m |
| 2018 | Asian Games | Jakarta, Indonesia | 3rd | Javelin throw | 80.75 m |
| 2019 | Asian Championships | Doha, Qatar | 6th | Javelin throw | 78.55 m |
| 2019 | World Championships | Doha, Qatar | 16th (q) | Javelin throw | 81.52 m NR |
| 2019 | South Asian Games | Kathmandu, Nepal | 1st | Javelin throw | 86.29 m GR NR |
| 2021 | Imam Reza Cup | Mashhad, Iran | 1st | Javelin throw | 86.38 m NR |
| 2021 | Olympic Games | Tokyo, Japan | 5th | Javelin throw | 84.62 m |
| 2022 | World Championships | Eugene, Oregon, United States | 5th | Javelin throw | 86.16 m |
| 2022 | Commonwealth Games | Birmingham, England | 1st | Javelin throw | 90.18 m GR NR |
| 2022 | Islamic Solidarity Games | Konya, Turkey | 1st | Javelin throw | 88.55 m GR |
| 2023 | World Championships | Budapest, Hungary | 2nd | Javelin throw | 87.82 m SB |
| 2024 | Olympic Games | Paris, France | 1st | Javelin throw | 92.97 m OR AR |
| 2025 | Asian Championships | Gumi, South Korea | 1st | Javelin throw | 86.40 m |
| 2025 | World Championships | Tokyo, Japan | 10th | Javelin throw | 82.75 m |
| 2025 | Islamic Solidarity Games | Riyadh, Saudi Arabia | 1st | Javelin throw | 83.05 m |
| 2026 | Commonwealth Games | Glasgow, Scotland | 9th | Javelin throw | 77.41 m |
| 2026 | World Ultimate Championship | Budapest, Hungary | 5th | Javelin throw | 81.49 m |
| 2026 | Asian Games | Nagoya, Japan | 4th | Javelin throw | 80.29 m |

== Seasonal bests by year ==
| Year | Performance | Place | Date |
|---|---|---|---|
| 2015 | 70.46 metres | Islamabad, Pakistan | 3 April |
| 2016 | 78.33 metres | Guwahati, India | 10 February |
| 2017 | 78 metres | Bhubaneswar, India | 9 July |
| 2018 | 80.75 metres | Jakarta, Indonesia | 27 August |
| 2019 | 86.29 metres (GR) | Kathmandu, Nepal | 7 December |
| 2021 | 86.38 metres | Mashhad, Iran | 12 April |
| 2022 | 90.18 metres (GR) | Birmingham, England | 7 August |
| 2023 | 87.82 metres | Budapest, Hungary | 27 August |
| 2024 | 92.97 metres (OR) (AR) | Paris, France | 8 August |
| 2025 | 86.40 metres | Gumi, South Korea | 31 May |
| 2026 | 81.49 metres | Budapest, Hungary | 13 September |

== Awards and recognition ==
| Ribbon | Decoration | Country | Year |
|---|---|---|---|
| | Pride of Performance | Pakistan | 2022 |
| | Hilal-e-Imtiaz | Pakistan | 2024 |

He was presented a Pride of Performance Award in 2022 by the President of Pakistan.

In August 2024, he was presented a Hilal-e-Imtiaz Award by the President of Pakistan for securing the country's first Olympic gold medal in four decades at the 2024 Summer Olympics. A special postage stamp themed Azm-e-Istehkam was also issued by the federal government in connection with Pakistan's Independence Day featuring an image of Nadeem. The Capital Development Authority upon the directives of the federal government, decided to rename the Service Road East in Islamabad's sector F-10, extending from the Jinnah Avenue to Khayaban-i-Iqbal after Arshad Nadeem. A book titled From Dream to Reality (Khawab Se Haqeeqat Tak), chronicling Arshad's Olympic gold medal journey, was launched in Lahore on the second anniversary of his Paris 2024 triumph.

In May 2025, he was honoured as the Best Asian Athlete by the Asian Athletics during a ceremony in Gumi, South Korea, recognizing his outstanding achievements and status as one of the continent's top athletes. He was also included in Forbes 30 Under 30 list for South Asia for his impact and excellence in athletics. On 29 December 2025, he received the Global Breakthrough Athlete Award at the World Sports Summit in Dubai, a premier global forum bringing together over 1,500 sports leaders, policymakers, and athletes to shape the future of the industry under the theme “Uniting the World Through Sport”.

Beyond sports, he has served as a brand ambassador for a number of brands and organizations, including Haier, FFC and PTCL. He is a sponsored athlete of Toyota Pakistan and represents the brand's global "Start Your Impossible" campaign.

== See also ==
- List of Pakistani records in athletics
- Athletics in Pakistan
- Pakistan at the Olympics
- Pakistan at the World Athletics Championships

Records
| Preceded by (Chinese Taipei) Cheng Chao-tsun | Men's Javelin Asian Record Holder; 8 August 2024 – present | Incumbent |
