= Max Dehning =

German athlete (born 2004)

Personal information
- Nationality: German
- Born: 9 September 2004 (age 21) Hermannsburg, Germany
- Height: 1.87 m (6 ft 2 in)

Sport
- Sport: Athletics
- Event: Javelin throw
- Club: LG Offenburg

Achievements and titles
- Personal bests: Javelin: 90.20 m (Halle, 2024)
Medal record
Men's athletics
Representing Germany
World U20 Championships
| Silver medal – second place | 2022 Cali | Javelin throw |
European U20 Championships
| Silver medal – second place | 2023 Jerusalem | Javelin |

Max Dehning (born 9 September 2004) is a German track and field athlete who competes in the javelin throw. He competed at the 2024 Olympic Games.

== Early life ==
From Hermannsburg, he was passionate about sports from a young age and played football and handball as a child. His path to athletics was through his older sister Marie, who competes in the heptathlon. He began throwing competitively at U16 level and became German youth champion in the javelin throw.

== Career ==
In September 2021, he set a new personal best in the javelin with a throw over 80 metres for the first time, throwing 80.11 metres in Jena. At the end of that season he left his local club TuS Bergen to become a member of TSV Bayer 04 Leverkusen. He later moved from Bayer Leverkusen to LG Offenburg.

In August 2022, Dehning was a silver medalist in the javelin at the 2022 World Athletics U20 Championships in Cali, Colombia.

In August 2023, Dehning was a silver medalist at the 2023 European Athletics U20 Championships in Jerusalem with a throw of 78.07 metres.

On 25 February 2024, Dehning became the youngest man to throw over 90 metres when he recorded a 90.20 metre throw Winter Throwing Championships in Halle, aged 19 years-old. This broke the Steve Backley European U23 record of 89.58 metres - a world record at the time - which dated back to 1990.

In June 2024, he competed at the 2024 European Athletics Championships in Rome. He threw 80.52 metres in qualifying to reach the final. He threw 76.16 metres in the final to place twelfth overall. He competed in the javelin at the 2024 Summer Olympics in Paris in August 2024, throwing 79.24 metres to finish twenty second in the qualifying round, and did not proceed to the final.

He won the javelin at the German Winter Throwing Championships in Halle in February 2025, with a throw of 79.61 metres. He competed in May 2025 at the 2025 Doha Diamond League.
