= Bandpur =

- village
- Location in Uttar Pradesh, India Bandpur (India)
- Coordinates: 28°54′N 77°16′E
- Country: India
- State: Uttar Pradesh
- District: Baghpat

Area
  - Total: 7 km^{2} (2.7 sq mi)

Languages
  - Official: Hindi
- Time zone: UTC+5:30 (IST)
- Nearest city: Baghpat
- Literacy: 78%
- Lok Sabha constituency: Baghpat
- Vidhan Sabha constituency: Khekra

Bandpur is a village located in the Khekra tehsil of Indian Bagpat district.

It is located about 3.5 km from the New Delhi-Saharanpur highway. Nearby villages are Katha, Harchandpur, Bada Gaon and Sunehra. Bandpur is connected to Khekra by a road and is connected to Katha by a Khcha road (Kharanja). Sunehra is a station on the Delhi-Saharanpur railway Line.
