= Athletics at the 2010 Commonwealth Games – Men's javelin throw =

Men's javelin throw at the Commonwealth Games
- Competitors: 11 from 9 nations
- Winning distance: 81.71 m

Medalists
gold medal	Jarrod Bannister	Australia
silver medal	Stuart Farquhar	New Zealand
bronze medal	Kashinath Naik	India

The Men's javelin throw at the 2010 Commonwealth Games as part of the athletics programme was held at the Jawaharlal Nehru Stadium on Tuesday 12 October 2010.

== Records ==
World Record	98.48	Jan Železný	(Czech Republic) CZE	Jena, Germany	25 May 1996
Games Record	88.75	Marius Corbett	(South Africa) RSA	Kuala Lumpur, Malaysia	21 September 1998

== Results ==
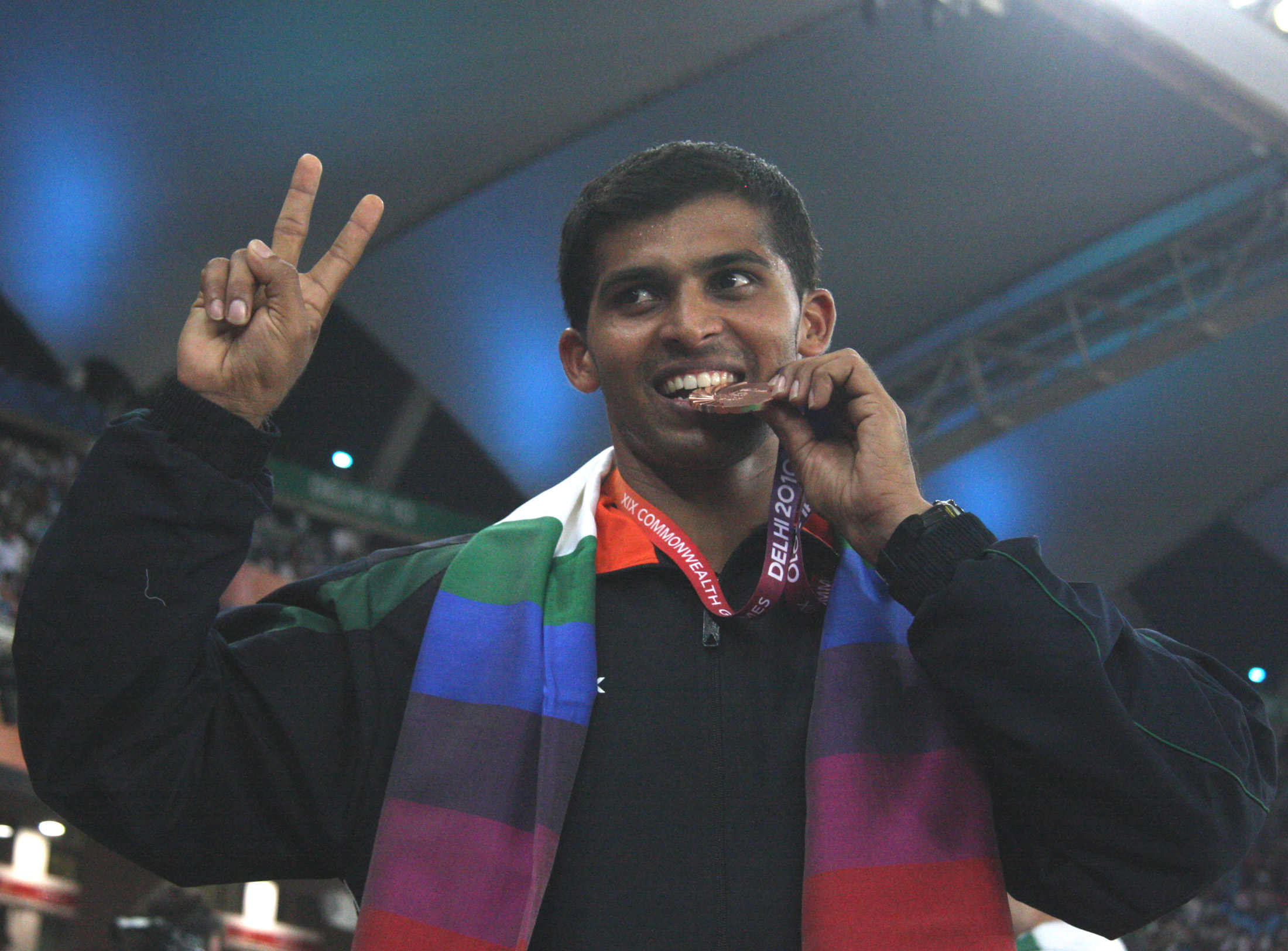
XIX Commonwealth Games-2010 Delhi (Athletics Men's Javelin Throw) Kashinath Naik of India won the bronze medal, at Jawaharlal Nehru Stadium, in New Delhi on October 12, 2010

Rank	Athlete	1	2	3	4	5	6	Result	Notes
1st place, gold medalist(s)	Jarrod Bannister (AUS)	79.11	80.12	81.71	x	x	–	81.71	
2nd place, silver medalist(s)	Stuart Farquhar (NZL)	70.64	76.93	73.39	73.79	x	78.15	78.15	
3rd place, bronze medalist(s)	Kashinath Naik (IND)	71.80	x	x	x	74.29	x	74.29	
4	Rajender Singh (IND)	73.72	x	70.34	69.25	70.70	65.83	73.72	
5	Lee Doran (WAL)	72.56	71.90	x	x	71.91	68.48	72.56	
6	James Campbell (SCO)	66.55	x	72.04	x	x	x	72.04	
7	Julius Yego (KEN)	x	69.60	x	69.03	67.80	x	69.60	
8	Samarjeet Singh (IND)	68.68	66.70	68.57	68.84	68.33	66.84	68.84	
9	Albert Reynolds (LCA)	67.06	65.19	x				67.06	
10	André Bazil (DMA)	63.10	54.81	60.95				63.10	
–	Oraine Brown (ANT)								DNS
