= Athletics at the 2026 Commonwealth Games – Men's javelin throw =

Men's javelin throw at the 2026 Commonwealth Games
- Venue: Scotstoun Stadium, Glasgow
- Dates: 31 July (qualification); 1 August (final)
- Winning distance: 89.75 m

Medalists
gold medal	Rumesh Tharanga	Sri Lanka
silver medal	Neeraj Chopra	India
bronze medal	Yashvir Singh	India

The men's javelin throw at the 2026 Commonwealth Games, as part of the athletics programme, took place in the Scotstoun Stadium from 30 to 31 July 2026.

== Records ==
Prior to this competition, the existing world, Commonwealth and Commonwealth Games records were as follows:

Men's Javelin throw
World record	98.48 m	Jan Železný (CZE)	25 May 1996	Jena, Germany
Commonwealth record	93.07 m	Anderson Peters (GRN)	13 May 2022	Doha, Qatar
Games record	90.18 m	Arshad Nadeem (PAK)	7 Aug 2022	Birmingham, England

== Schedule ==
The schedule was as follows:

Date	Time	Round
30 July 2026	10:00	Qualification
31 July 2026	20:15	Final

All times are British Summer Time (UTC+1)

== Results ==
=== Qualification ===
The qualification round was held in the morning of 30 July 2026.

Rank	Name	1	2	3	Result	Notes
1	Rumesh Tharanga (SRI)	82.84	–	–	82.84	q
2	Anderson Peters (GRN)	76.09	81.29	76.70	81.29	q
3	Douw Smit (RSA)	80.64	x	x	80.64	q
4	Ben East (ENG)	73.50	80.38	–	80.38	q
5	Neeraj Chopra (IND)	76.28	79.61	–	79.61	q
6	Cameron McEntyre (AUS)	72.43	78.91	–	78.91	q
7	Arshad Nadeem (PAK)	78.63	x	75.65	78.63	SB, q
8	Keyshawn Strachan (BAH)	x	x	78.60	78.60	q
9	Rohit Yadav (IND)	77.04	78.37	–	78.37	q
10	Yashvir Singh (IND)	73.89	74.45	78.36	78.36	q
11	Keshorn Walcott (TTO)	78.26	x	75.53	78.26	q
12	Nnamdi Chinecherem (NGR)	x	73.26	75.27	75.27	q
13	Julius Yego (KEN)	72.24	72.25	74.50	74.50	
14	Muhammad Yasir (PAK)	×	71.42	74.36	74.36	
15	Lakona Gerega (PNG)	65.59	x	54.34	65.59	
16	Elvis Graham (JAM)	x	x	65.07	65.07	
17	Usufono Eneli (TUV)	39.28	r		39.28	
	Sumeda Ranasinghe (SRI)	x	x	x	NM	

=== Final ===
The final was held on 31 July 2026.

Rank	Name	1	2	3	4	5	6	Result	Notes
1st place, gold medalist(s)	Rumesh Tharanga (SRI)	x	89.75	x	x	x	x	89.75	
2nd place, silver medalist(s)	Neeraj Chopra (IND)	80.97	85.83	81.29	80.73	x	x	85.83	SB
3rd place, bronze medalist(s)	Yashvir Singh (IND)	x	78.55	81.33	x	76.95	85.41	85.41	PB
4	Anderson Peters (GRN)	x	81.41	82.55	79.46	79.08	83.88	83.88	
5	Douw Smit (RSA)	x	82.88	x	x	x	x	82.88	
6	Keshorn Walcott (TTO)	76.33	78.72	78.85	77.42	x	82.55	82.55	
7	Rohit Yadav (IND)	77.50	81.56	x	73.70	x	79.55	81.56	
8	Ben East (ENG)	81.12	76.53	71.56	75.66	74.80	72.51	81.12	PB
9	Arshad Nadeem (PAK)	x	77.41	75.39				77.41	
10	Nnamdi Chinecherem (NGR)	76.29	75.06	75.34				76.29	
11	Cameron McEntyre (AUS)	71.66	72.44	x				72.44	
12	Keyshawn Strachan (BAH)	x	70.39	x				70.39	
