= Sukhera =

Punjabi Rajput and Jat tribe

Sukhera or Sukheda is a Rajput and Jat tribe in Punjab, Pakistan. The Sukhera Rajputs originated from Abohar in what is now Punjab, India and migrated to Pakistan after the Partition in 1947.

== People with surname Sukhera ==
Notable people with the surname, who may or may not be affiliated with the tribe, include:

- Sardar Ahmad Nawaz Sukhera
- Asif Mumtaz Sukhera
