= Benjamin East =

British athlete

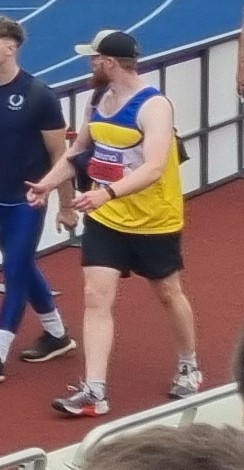
- 2025 UK Athletics Championships

Personal information
- Nationality: British (English)
- Born: 19 November 2003 (age 23)

Sport
- Sport: Track and Field
- Event: Javelin throw
- Club: Team Kennet (Berkshire)
Medal record
Representing England
British Championships
Gold medal – first place	2023 Manchester	javelin
Gold medal – first place	2026 Birmingham	javelin

Benjamin East (born 19 November 2003) is a British athlete specialising in the javelin throw. In 2023, he became the British champion in the javelin.

== Biography ==
East set the British U15 record in 2018 by throwing 67.04 metres. He was educated at Loughborough University and represented Great Britain at the 2022 U20 World Championships in Colombia.

East became the British champion in 2023, after winning the gold medal at the javelin throw at the 2023 British Athletics Championships, held in Manchester, having previously won the silver medal the year before.

In July 2025, East won the England Athletics Championships in Birmingham with a throw of 74.46 metres. In August, East threw a personal best of 77.40 metres in finishing second to Michael Allison at the 2025 UK Athletics Championships.

In 2026, East progressed first to 78.77 m and then 80.05 m, prior to throwing a new personal best of 80.49 metres to win the Meeting Nikaia on 13 June 2026. The following week, he won the 2026 UK Athletics Championships title ahead of defending champion Allison, making a throw of 79.87 metres. On 31 July, he made a new personal best throw of 81.12 m and finished eighth at the 2026 Commonwealth Games in Glasgow. In August, he competed at the 2026 European Athletics Championships in Birmingham, England, in the javelin throw.
