= Noorpur Muzbida Harsana =

Village in Uttar Pradesh, India

Noorpur Muzvita (also known as Noorpur Muzbida or Noorpur Harsana) is a village in the Khekra Tehsil, Bagpat district of Uttar Pradesh, India. Having a population of more than 3,000, this village is 3 km (1.9 mi) from Khekra and 9.2 km (5.7 mi) from Bagpat, the main city of the district.

== Geography ==
Noorpur is located at 29.7°N 77.18°E. It has an average elevation of 230 metres (754 ft). The village is located on the banks of river Yamuna. It is 58 km from Meerut City and is on the main Delhi – Saharanpur Highway around 40 km from Delhi. In the north of the district Bagpat there is district Muzaffarnagar, in the south district Ghaziabad, in the west river Yamuna and district Rohtak of Haryana. The distance to New Delhi from this village is 40 km.

== Education ==
Educational institutions of Noorpur are:

- Gandhi Vidya Niketan Degree College, Ramala
- Sardar Patal High School Uttar Pradesh/Baghpat/Bali Mewla, baghpat U.P. 250601
- Aryabhatt College Of Engg. & Technology
- Dav English Medium School Uttar Pradesh/Baghpat/Baghpat
- Janta Inter College

== Economy/Agricultural ==
Noorpur has agriculture as its main industry. The area is fertile, being close to the river Yamuna/Jamuna. Main crops are wheat, sugarcane and mustard. In fruits guavas are grown and Grapes too. Watermelons, muskmelons and 'kakri' make their appearance during summers.
