= Michael Allison (javelin thrower) =

British athlete (born 2004)

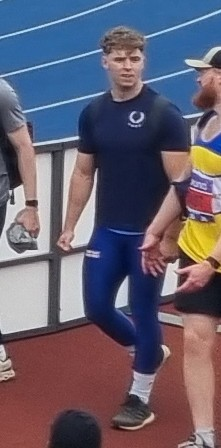
- 2025 UK Athletics Championships

Personal information
- Nationality: British
- Born: 17 May 2004 (age 22)

Sport
- Sport: Athletics
- Event: Javelin throw
- Club: Windsor, Slough, Eton and Hounslow AC

Achievements and titles
- Personal bests: Javelin: 78.48 m (Birmingham, 2025)
Medal record
Men's athletics
Representing Great Britain
European U20 Championships
| Bronze medal – third place | 2023 Jerusalem | Javelin |
British Championships
| Gold medal – first place | 2025 Birmingham | Javelin |

Michael Allison (born 17 May 2004) is a British athlete specialising in the javelin throw. He won the 2025 UK Athletics Championships and was a European under-20 bronze medalist in 2023.

== Biography ==
Allison studied physics at St Anne's College, Oxford.

He competed as a high jumper and was also a keen rugby union player, but taught himself to throw the javelin during the COVID-19 pandemic, using a 700g javelin and following YouTube tutorials and throwing on his local village football pitch during lockdown. A member of Windsor Slough Eton & Hounslow athletics club, he had a fifth-place finish in the English Schools Championships and later became coached by Tom Dobbing after the pair met in 2021.

He qualified for the final of the javelin throw at the 2022 World Athletics U20 Championships in Cali, Colombia. He threw a four-metre personal best of 76.97m to win the British under-20 championships in June 2023, which placed him fourth on the British under-20 all-time list. He won bronze in the javelin at the 2023 European Athletics U20 Championships in Jerusalem. He was the first British medalist in the javelin at the Championships since Goldie Sayers in 2001.

In November 2024, he was named by British Athletics on the Olympic Futures Programme for 2025. He threw a personal best of 78.48 metres to win his first senior British javelin title at the 2025 UK Athletics Championships on 2 August 2025. His throw was the best mark at the UK Championships for 13 years, and also the furthest by any British man since 2022. In October 2025, he was retained on the British Athletics Olympic Futures Programme for 2025/26.

With a throw of 77.63 metres, Allison placed second behind Ben East at the 2026 UK Athletics Championships in Birmingham. In October 2026, he was retained on the 2026/27 Olympic Futures Programme awarded by UK Athletics.
