= 2025 World Athletics Championships – Men's javelin throw =

Men's javelin throw at the 2025 World Athletics Championships
- Venue: National Stadium
- Location: Tokyo, Japan
- Dates: 17 September (qualification); 18 September (final)
- Winning distance: 88.16 m

Medalists
gold medal	Keshorn Walcott	Trinidad and Tobago
silver medal	Anderson Peters	Grenada
bronze medal	Curtis Thompson	United States

The men's javelin throw at the 2025 World Athletics Championships was held at the National Stadium in Tokyo on 17 and 18 September 2025.

== Records ==
Before the competition records were as follows:

Record	Athlete & Nat.	Perf.	Location	Date
World record	Jan Železný (CZE)	98.48 m	Jena, Germany	25 May 1996
Championship record	Jan Železný (CZE)	92.80 m	Edmonton, Canada	12 August 2001
World Leading	Julian Weber (GER)	91.51 m	Zurich, Switzerland	28 August 2025
African Record	Julius Yego (KEN)	92.72 m	Beijing, China	26 August 2015
Asian Record	Arshad Nadeem (PAK)	92.97 m	Paris, France	8 August 2024
European Record	Jan Železný (CZE)	98.48 m	Jena, Germany	25 May 1996
North, Central American and Caribbean record	Anderson Peters (GRN)	93.07 m	Doha, Qatar	13 May 2022
Oceanian record	Jarrod Bannister (AUS)	89.02 m	Brisbane, Australia	29 February 2008
South American Record	Luiz Maurício da Silva (BRA)	91.00 m	São Paulo, Brazil	3 August 2025

== Qualification standard ==
The standard to qualify automatically for entry was 85.50 m.

== Schedule ==
The event schedule, in local time (UTC+9), was as follows:

Date	Time	Round
17 September	19:10	Qualification
18 September	19:23	Final

== Results ==
=== Qualification ===
All athletes over 84.50 m ( Q ) or at least the 12 best performers ( q ) advanced to the final.

==== Group A ====
Place	Athlete	Nation	Round			Mark	Notes
Place	Athlete	Nation	#1	#2	#3	Mark	Notes
1	Julian Weber	Germany	82.29	87.21		87.21 m	Q
2	Dawid Wegner	Poland	79.72	73.97	85.67	85.67 m	Q, PB
3	Neeraj Chopra	India	84.85			84.85 m	Q
4	Jakub Vadlejch	Czech Republic	80.46	84.11	–	84.11 m	q, SB
5	Keshorn Walcott	Trinidad and Tobago	83.93	77.61	x	83.93 m	q
6	Sachin Yadav	India	80.16	83.67	82.63	83.67 m	q
7	Edis Matusevičius	Lithuania	79.73	82.78	x	82.78 m	
8	Sumeda Ranasinghe	Sri Lanka	80.36	81.54	81.86	81.86 m	
9	Cyprian Mrzygłód	Poland	81.47	79.54	78.86	81.47 m	
10	Lassi Etelätalo	Finland	x	75.74	81.33	81.33 m	
11	Marc Minichello	United States	71.04	x	80.47	80.47 m	
12	Keyshawn Strachan	Bahamas	80.03	x	x	80.03 m	
13	Hu Haoran	China	79.42	76.04	78.10	79.42 m	
14	Pedro Henrique Rodrigues	Brazil	x	74.11	79.35	79.35 m	
15	Yuta Sakiyama	Japan	76.30	x	77.61	77.61 m	
16	Genki Dean	Japan	77.01	76.58	72.89	77.01 m	
17	Leandro Ramos	Portugal	74.46	74.43	76.65	76.65 m	
18	Billy Julio	Colombia	70.71	74.78	76.01	76.01 m	
19	Sindri Hrafn Guðmundsson	Iceland	75.56	74.49	x	75.56 m	

==== Group B ====
Place	Athlete	Nation	Round			Mark	Notes
Place	Athlete	Nation	#1	#2	#3	Mark	Notes
1	Anderson Peters	Grenada	84.44	89.53		89.53 m	Q, SB
2	Julius Yego	Kenya	85.96			85.96 m	Q, SB
3	Arshad Nadeem	Pakistan	76.99	74.17	85.28	85.28 m	Q
4	Curtis Thompson	United States	77.97	84.72		84.72 m	Q
5	Cameron McEntyre	Australia	76.90	83.03	x	83.03 m	q, PB
6	Rumesh Tharanga	Sri Lanka	82.44	82.27	82.80	82.80 m	q
7	Simon Wieland	Switzerland	82.26	x	79.71	82.26 m	NR
8	Douw Smit	South Africa	81.23	x	76.73	81.23 m	
9	Luiz Maurício da Silva	Brazil	78.90	71.35	81.12	81.12 m	
10	Marcin Krukowski	Poland	76.87	77.77	80.29	80.29 m	
11	Oliver Helander	Finland	79.75	x	x	79.75 m	
12	Lars Flaming	Paraguay	74.96	x	79.07	79.07 m	
13	Eemil Porvari	Finland	78.51	76.95	77.81	78.51 m	
14	Rohit Yadav	India	77.81	74.51	x	77.81 m	
15	Yashvir Singh	India	76.11	76.21	77.51	77.51 m	
16	Artur Felfner	Ukraine	73.77	76.13	x	76.13 m	
17	Gen Naganuma	Japan	74.70	x	72.43	74.70 m	
18	Martin Konečný	Czech Republic	73.38	72.31	x	73.38 m	

=== Final ===
Place	Athlete	Nation	Round						Mark	Notes
Place	Athlete	Nation	#1	#2	#3	#4	#5	#6	Mark	Notes
1st place, gold medalist(s)	Keshorn Walcott	Trinidad and Tobago	81.22	87.83	81.65	88.16	85.84	83.00	88.16 m	SB
2nd place, silver medalist(s)	Anderson Peters	Grenada	84.59	87.38	82.83	83.62	84.19	86.26	87.38 m	
3rd place, bronze medalist(s)	Curtis Thompson	United States	86.67	81.36	85.31	x	x	x	86.67 m	
4	Sachin Yadav	India	86.27	x	85.71	84.90	85.96	80.95	86.27 m	PB
5	Julian Weber	Germany	83.63	86.11	x	80.66	81.57	84.67	86.11 m	
6	Julius Yego	Kenya	76.58	85.54	x	–	–	–	85.54 m	
7	Rumesh Tharanga	Sri Lanka	84.38	81.22	82.17	x	x		84.38 m	
8	Neeraj Chopra	India	83.65	84.03	x	82.86	x		84.03 m	
9	Dawid Wegner	Poland	77.15	82.84	78.19	83.03			83.03 m	
10	Arshad Nadeem	Pakistan	82.73	x	82.75	x			82.75 m	
11	Jakub Vadlejch	Czech Republic	78.71	x	x				78.71 m	
12	Cameron McEntyre	Australia	74.39	75.65	x				75.65 m	
