= Asif Mumtaz Sukhera =

Pakistani Army medical officer and Lieutenant General

Surgeon General of Pakistan Army
- In office July 2016 – September 2017
- Preceded by: Lt Gen Syed Muhammad Imran Majeed
- Succeeded by: Lt Gen Khawar Rehman

Vice Chancellor of Mohi-ud-Din Islamic Medical College
- In office 2018–present

Personal details
- Awards: Hilal-i-Imtiaz (Military)

Military service
- Allegiance: Pakistan Pakistan
- Branch/service: Pakistan Army Pakistan Army
- Years of service: 1982–2017
- Rank: Lieutenant General
- Unit: Army Medical Corps (Pakistan)

Asif Mumtaz Sukhera is a retired Pakistani lieutenant general and senior medical officer of the Pakistan Army. He served as the Surgeon General of Pakistan Army from 2016 to 2017, overseeing health care delivery across military hospitals and leading quality improvements in the Army Medical Corps (Pakistan).

== Military career ==
Sukhera was commissioned into the Army Medical Corps (Pakistan), where he progressed through various medical leadership roles. As Surgeon General, he directed the military's medical policy and spearheaded modernization programs in military hospitals.

He served as from Colonel Commandant of Army Medical Corps (Pakistan) from July, 2016 till September, 2017.

He was promoted from Major General to the rank of Lieutenant General in 2016.

== Post-retirement ==
Foowing his retirement, Sukhera was appointed as the Vice Chanc.ellor of Mohi-ud-Din Islamic Medical College.

== Awards and decorations ==
- Hilal-i-Imtiaz (Military) – Awarded in recognition of his outstanding services to military medicine.
