= Neeraj Chopra Classic =

Javelin throw tournament held in India

- Location: India
- Event type: Javelin throw
- Established: 5 July 2025; 16 months ago
- Website: Neeraj Chopra Classic

Neeraj Chopra Classic, also known as the NC Classic, is a World Athletics javelin competition held in India. Named after the Indian javelin icon Neeraj Chopra, it is the nation's first international javelin event. The competition offers gold-level ranking points to athletes.

== History ==
The initial idea was to hold the inaugural competition at Tau Devi Lal Athletic Stadium in Panchkula, a region where Neeraj Chopra started his career. But the venue was shifted to Sree Kanteerava Stadium in Bengaluru to fulfill the infrastructure requirements for a gold category event. Originally scheduled for 24 May 2025 in Bengaluru, the event was rescheduled to July 5 due to the 2025 India and Pakistan crisis. Julius Yego, Thomas Röhler, Curtis Thompson and other javelin stars participated in the first edition. Laser lights and dance performances kicked off the inaugural edition of the javelin meet.

== Results ==
Edition	Venue	Gold	Silver	Bronze	Ref
2025	Sree Kanteerava Stadium, Bengaluru	(India) Neeraj Chopra (86.18m)	(Kenya) Julius Yego (84.51m)	(Sri Lanka) Rumesh Tharanga (84.34m)	
