= Yuta Sakiyama =

Japanese athlete (born 1996)

Personal information
- Born: 5 April 1996 (age 30)

Sport
- Sport: Athletics
- Event: Javelin

Achievements and titles
- Personal best(s): Javelin: 87.16 m (Gumi, 2025)
Medal record
Men's athletics
Representing Japan
Asian Championships
Bronze medal – third place	2025 Gumi	Javelin

Yuta Sakiyama (born 5 April 1996) is a Japanese javelin thrower who won the Japanese Athletics Championships in 2025. He represented Japan at the 2023 World Athletics Championships.

== Career ==
In May 2023 in Osaka, he made a throw of 83.54 meters, the fifth-best in Japan's history. He competed for Japan at the 2023 World Athletics Championships in Budapest, Hungary, but did not register a valid throw.

He was a bronze medalist at the 2025 Asian Athletics Championships in Gumi, South Korea in May 2025 with an 83.75m throw, a new personal best. In July 2025, he won the Japanese Athletics Championships in Tokyo with a personal best throw of 87.16 metres. The throw also moved him to second on the Japanese all-time list. He was subsequently named that month to the Japanese national team competing at the 2025 World Athletics Championships in Tokyo, Japan, throwing 77.61 metres without advancing to the final.

== Personal life ==
He is from Nara Prefecture. He attended Nihon University, after which he was based in Imabari, Ehime where he was coached by Hamamoto Kazuma, who previously trained Yukifumi Murakami.
