= Curtis Thompson (javelin thrower) =

American javelin thrower (born 1996)

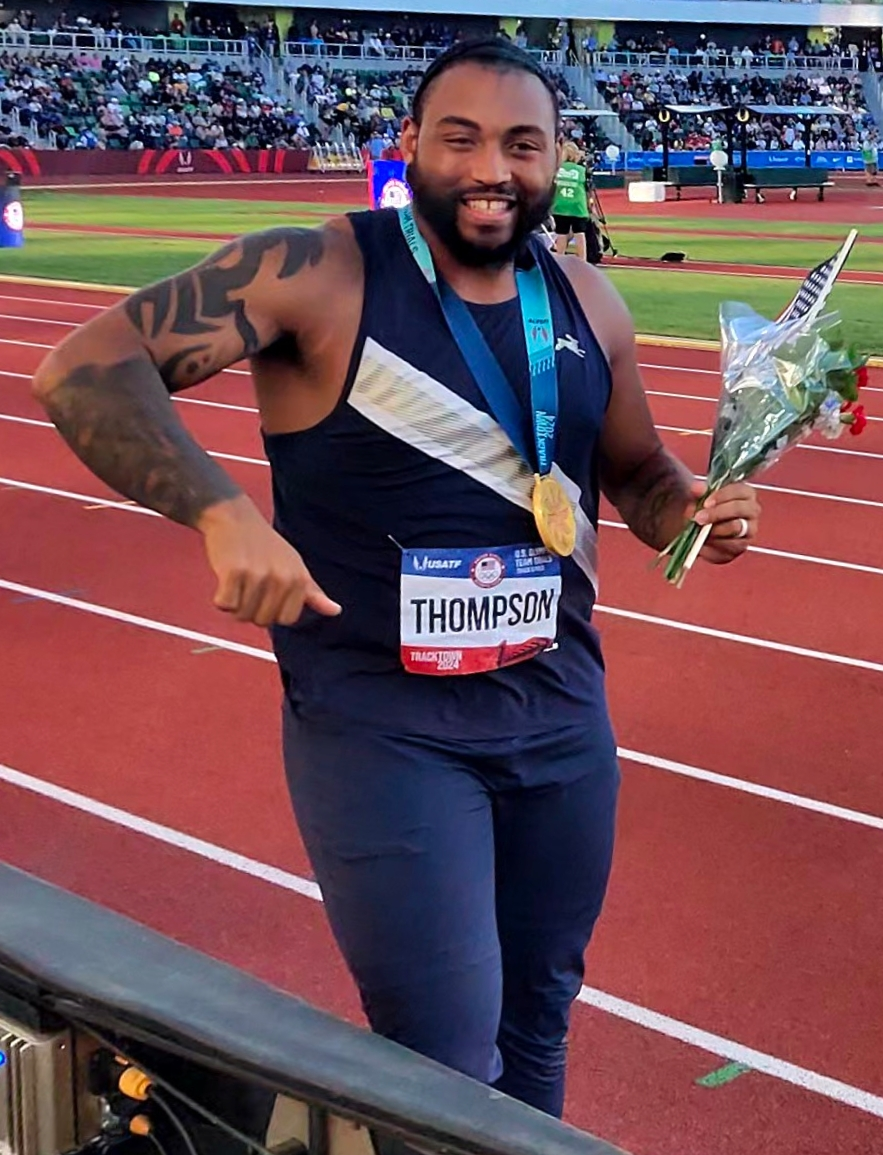
- Thompson in 2024

Personal information
- Born: 8 February 1996 (age 30) Trenton, New Jersey, U.S.

Sport
- Sport: Athletics
- Event: Javelin throw

Achievements and titles
- Personal best: 87.76 m (2025)
Medal record
Men's athletics
Representing United States
World Championships
Bronze medal – third place	2025 Tokyo	Javelin throw
Pan American Games
Gold medal – first place	2023 Santiago	Javelin throw
NACAC Championships
Gold medal – first place	2025 Freeport	Javelin throw
Gold medal – first place	2022 Freeport	Javelin throw

Curtis Thompson (born 8 February 1996) is an American javelin thrower. He won the bronze medal at the 2025 World Championships, and gold medals at the 2023 Pan American Games and, the 2022 and 2025 NACAC Championships.

== Career ==
Thompson won the NCAA title for Mississippi State University in 2016, and he also won the 2018 USATF Championship.

At the 2020 United States Olympic trials (track and field) held in Eugene, Oregon, on June 21, 2021, he won the javelin title with a top throw of 82.78 meters to beat runner-up Michael Shuey, whose top throw was 79.24 meters. Riley Dolezal finished third with a throw of 77.07 meters and individually recorded the four best throws of the competition. At the 2022 World Athletics Championships in Eugene, Oregon, he qualified for the final. He won the gold medal at the 2022 NACAC Championships in Freeport, Bahamas.

He was selected for the 2023 World Athletics Championships in Budapest in August 2023. He won gold at the 2023 Pan American Games in Santiago in November 2023.

In August 2024, Thompson threw a 76.79 meters at the 2024 Summer Olympics qualifications, placing him at thirteenth place and failing to qualify for the finals.

He started his 2025 season with a personal best of 87.76 meters at the Texas Relays. He threw 83.89 metres to win the javelin throw at the 2025 USA Outdoor Track and Field Championships in Eugene, Oregon to retain the American national title. He won the gold medal at the 2025 NACAC Championships, breaking his own championship record set in 2022, with a throw of 87.27 metres.

In September 2025, he threw 86.67 metres to win the bronze medal at the 2025 World Athletics Championships in Tokyo, Japan.

On 28 March 2026, he placed second behind Marc Anthony Minichello in the javelin throw at the USATF Winter Long Throws National Championship in Arizona with a throw of 74.78 metres. On 23 April, he won the Drake Relays where he threw 84.63 meters. On 4 June, he finished third at the 2026 Golden Gala in Rome, part of the 2026 Diamond League, with a throw of 83.89 metres. On 6 June, he won with a throw of 84.88 metres at the USATF Lone Star Grand Prix in College Station, Texas. On 19 June, he threw 85.99 metres to place third at the 2026 Doha Diamond League. On 25 July, he won the javelin throw at the 2026 USA Outdoor Track and Field Championships in New York, throwing 87.59 metres in the last round to beat Jordan Davis and claim his fourth consecutive national title. At the 2026 Diamond League Final in Brussels on 5 September, he placed seventh with 69.52 metres.

== Personal life ==
Born in Trenton, New Jersey, and raised in Florence Township, New Jersey, Thompson is a 2014 graduate of Florence Township Memorial High School. His parents are Scott and Karen Thompson. His brother, Christopher, was a collegiate basketball player. Thompson's athletic genes carry through the family as he has several aunts, uncles, and cousins who played badminton for the Jamaican national team.

He formerly coached for the Spain Park High School team, before later moving to Huntsville.

In 2023, he and his father wrote a book about the behind the scenes moments of raising a champion.
