= Kashinath Naik =

Indian javelin thrower

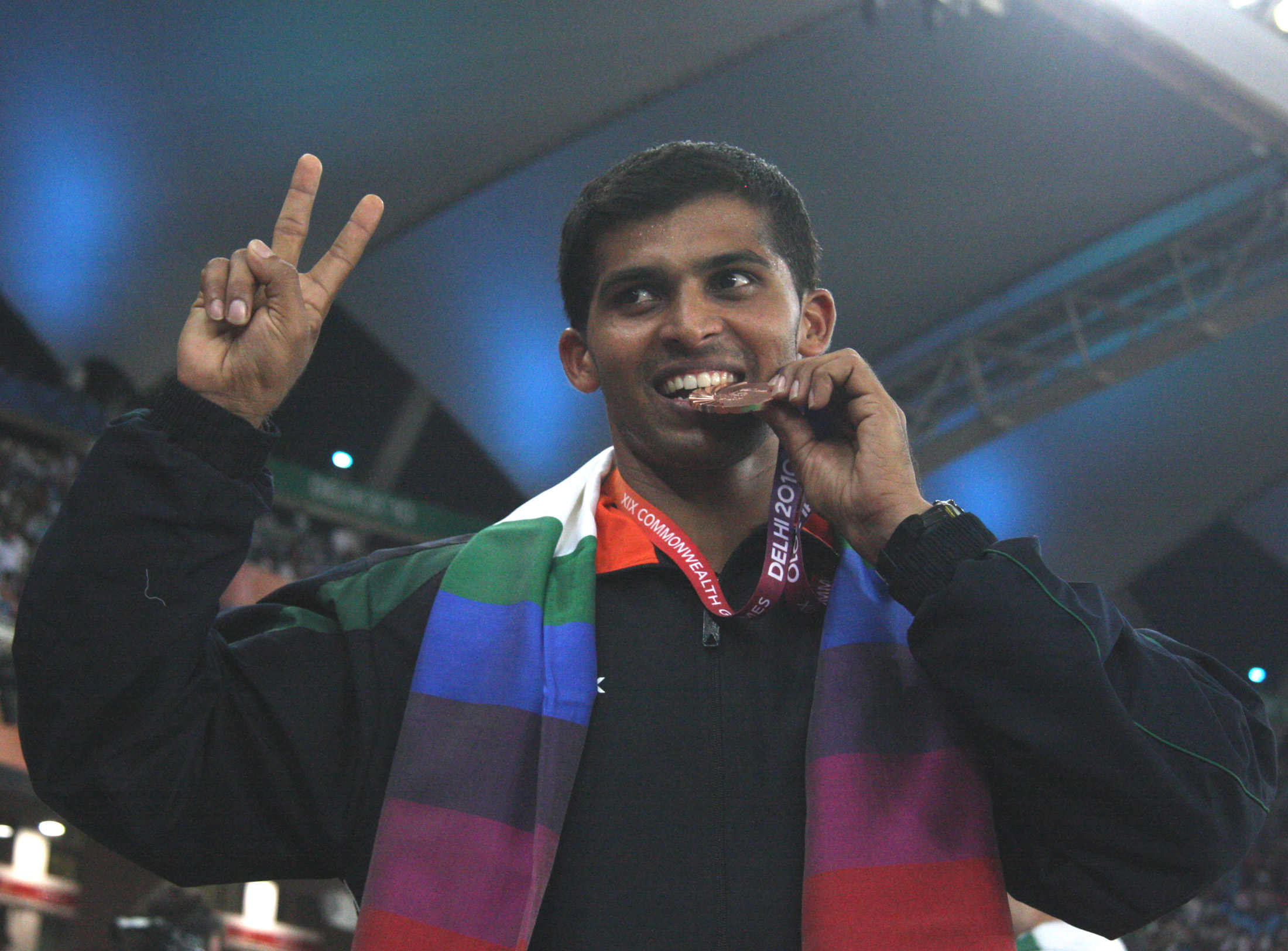
- XIX Commonwealth Games-2010 Delhi (Athletics Men's Javelin Throw) Kashinath Naik of India won the Bronze Medal, at Jawaharlal Nehru Stadium, in New Delhi on October 12, 2010.

Personal information
- Born: 12 May 1983 (age 43) Sirsi, Karnataka, India

Sport
- Country: India
- Sport: Athletics
- Event: Javelin

Achievements and titles
- Personal bests: 77.33 meters (Hyderabad 2009)
Medal record
Commonwealth Games
Bronze medal – third place	2010 Delhi	Javelin

Kashinath Naik (born 12 May 1983) is an Indian javelin thrower.

He won the bronze medal at the 2010 Commonwealth Games with a throw of 74.29 meters. He holds the post of Naib Subedar in the Indian Army.
