= Neeraj Chopra =

Indian javelin thrower (born 1997)

Lieutenant Colonel Neeraj Chopra PVSM VSM
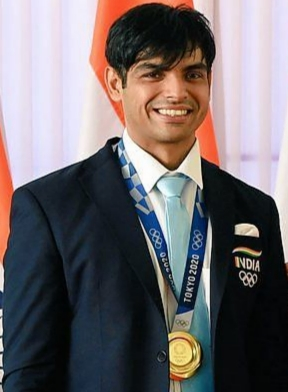
- Chopra in 2021

Personal information
- Nickname: Sarpanch
- Nationality: Indian
- Born: 24 December 1997 (age 28) Khandra, Haryana, India
- Education: DAV College; Lovely Professional University
- Years active: 2010–present
- Height: 1.86 m (6 ft 1 in)
- Weight: 86 kg (190 lb)
- Spouse: Himani Mor (m. 2025)
- Website: https://neerajchopra.co.in/
- Military career
- Allegiance: India
- Branch: Indian Army
- Service years: 2016–present
- Rank: Lieutenant Colonel (Hon.)
- Service number: JC-471869A
- Unit: Territorial Army
- Awards: Param Vishisht Seva Medal; Padma Shri; Vishisht Seva Medal

Sport
- Country: India
- Sport: Athletics
- Event: Javelin throw

Achievements and titles
- Olympic finals: (gold) 2020 (silver) 2024
- World finals: (gold) 2023 (silver) 2022
- Regional finals: (gold) 2016 (gold) 2017 (gold) 2018 (gold) 2022
- Commonwealth finals: (gold) 2018 (silver) 2026
- Highest world ranking: 1 (May 2023)
- Personal bests: 90.23 m NR (2025); 86.48 m WJR (2016)
Medal record
Men's athletics
Representing India
Event	1st	2nd	3rd
Olympic Games	1	1	-
World Championships	1	1	-
Diamond League	1	-	-
Commonwealth Games	1	1	-
Asian Games	2	-	-
Asian Championships	1	-	-
South Asian Games	1	-	-
U20 World Championships	1	-	-
U20 Asian Championships	0	1	0
Total	9	4	0
Olympic Games
Gold medal – first place	2020 Tokyo	Javelin throw
Silver medal – second place	2024 Paris	Javelin throw
World Championships
Gold medal – first place	2023 Budapest	Javelin throw
Silver medal – second place	2022 Eugene	Javelin throw
Diamond League
First place	2022 Zurich	Javelin throw
Commonwealth Games
Gold medal – first place	2018 Gold Coast	Javelin throw
Silver medal – second place	2026 Glasgow	Javelin throw
Asian Games
Gold medal – first place	2018 Jakarta	Javelin throw
Gold medal – first place	2022 Hangzhou	Javelin throw
Asian Championships
Gold medal – first place	2017 Bhubaneshwar	Javelin throw
South Asian Games
Gold medal – first place	2016 Guwahati	Javelin throw
U20 World Championships
Gold medal – first place	2016 Bydgoszcz	Javelin throw
U20 Asian Championships
Silver medal – second place	2016 Ho Chi Minh City	Javelin throw

Lieutenant Colonel Neeraj Chopra PVSM VSM (born 24 December 1997) is an Indian javelin thrower. He has won gold medals at the Olympic Games, World Championships, Commonwealth Games, Asian Championships and Asian Games. Chopra has won the Diamond League once. He won the Olympic gold medal in 2020 and became the first Asian javelin thrower to do so. He became the first Asian to win a gold medal in javelin throw at the 2023 World Championships. Chopra finished in the top two in 26 consecutive tournaments from June 2021 to September 2025, the second longest such streak in history behind that of javelin world record holder Jan Železný.

Chopra is the first athletics gold medalist for India. As of 2024, he is one of only two Indians to have won an individual Olympic gold medal, the youngest-ever Indian Olympic gold medalist in an individual event and the only individual to have won gold on his Olympic debut. After his silver at the 2024 Olympics, he became one of five individual multiple Olympic medalists for India. He is the first Indian to win a gold medal at the World U20 Championships, where he set the current world U20 record throw of 86.48 m in 2016, also becoming the first Indian athlete to set a world record in athletics.

== Early life ==
=== Family ===
Chopra was born on 24 December 1997 in a Haryanvi Ror family in Khandra village in Panipat district of Haryana. His mother Saroj Devi and father Satish Chopra are both farmers. He has two sisters, Savita Chopra and Sangeeta Chopra.

=== Education and early training ===
Chopra did his initial schooling at Bhartiya Vidya Niketan Public School, Panipat. After being teased about his obesity, he enrolled in a gym in Panipat. While training there, he saw javelin throwers practising at the Shivaji Stadium and took up the sport. In 2010, he moved to Panchkula to train at the Tau Devi Lal Sports Complex, aged 13. After moving to Panchkula, he joined the Dayanand Anglo-Vedic College, Chandigarh, where he completed his schooling.

Alongside his schooling, Chopra won several national javelin championships in 2012 and 2014. Because of his performance at sports tournaments, Chopra was recruited into the Indian Army in 2016, where he was selected for the Mission Olympics Wing training at the Army Sports Institute in Pune. In 2021, he enrolled at Lovely Professional University in Jalandhar, Punjab and then proceeded to complete his Bachelor of Arts degree.

== Personal life ==
In January 2025, Chopra married former tennis player and coach Himani Mor.

== Career ==
=== Beginnings (2010–2012) ===
In 2010, Chopra took part in a trial at the Sports Authority of India centre in Panipat. On observing his ability to achieve good throws without any formal training, javelin thrower Jaiveer Singh started training him. He learned the basics of the sport from Singh and practised with athletes at Jalandhar. He finished third at the district event, and persuaded his family to let him train at the SAI centre to hone his abilities. After training at SAI for a year, the 13-year-old Chopra moved to train at the Tau Devi Lal Stadium in Panchkula, one of the only two facilities in Haryana with a synthetic runway. As the facility lacked a specialised javelin coach, he trained under Naseem Ahmad, a running coach.

At the time, he and fellow javelin thrower Parminder Singh watched videos of Jan Zelezny to try and emulate his style. Initially, he achieved throws of around 55 m (180 ft), but slowly increased his range. At the National Junior Athletics Championships held at Lucknow in October 2012, he won the gold medal with a new junior national record throw of 68.40 m (224.4 ft).

=== International level emergence (2013–2016) ===
In 2013, Chopra competed in his first international competition, the World Youth Championships in Donetsk, Ukraine, where he finished 19th in the overall classification with a best throw of 66.75 m. He won his first international medal in 2014, a silver at the Youth Olympics Qualification in Bangkok. At the 2014 senior nationals, he achieved his first throw of over 70 m (230 ft). In 2015, he broke the then world junior record at the 2015 All India Inter-University Athletics meet with a throw of 81.04 m (265.9 ft), which was his first throw over 80 m (260 ft). Chopra finished fifth at the 2015 National Games in Kerala. He also participated at the 2015 Asian Athletics Championships where he finished 9th with a best throw of 70.50 m. As a result of his performance, he was called up to the national-level training camp at the Netaji Subhas National Institute of Sports in Patiala in early 2016. According to him, this was a turning point in his career, as he received better facilities, better food and an improved standard of training from what was available at Panchkula. Also, training with national level javelin throwers helped boost his morale. He was assigned 2010 Commonwealth Games bronze medalist Kashinath Naik as his coach.

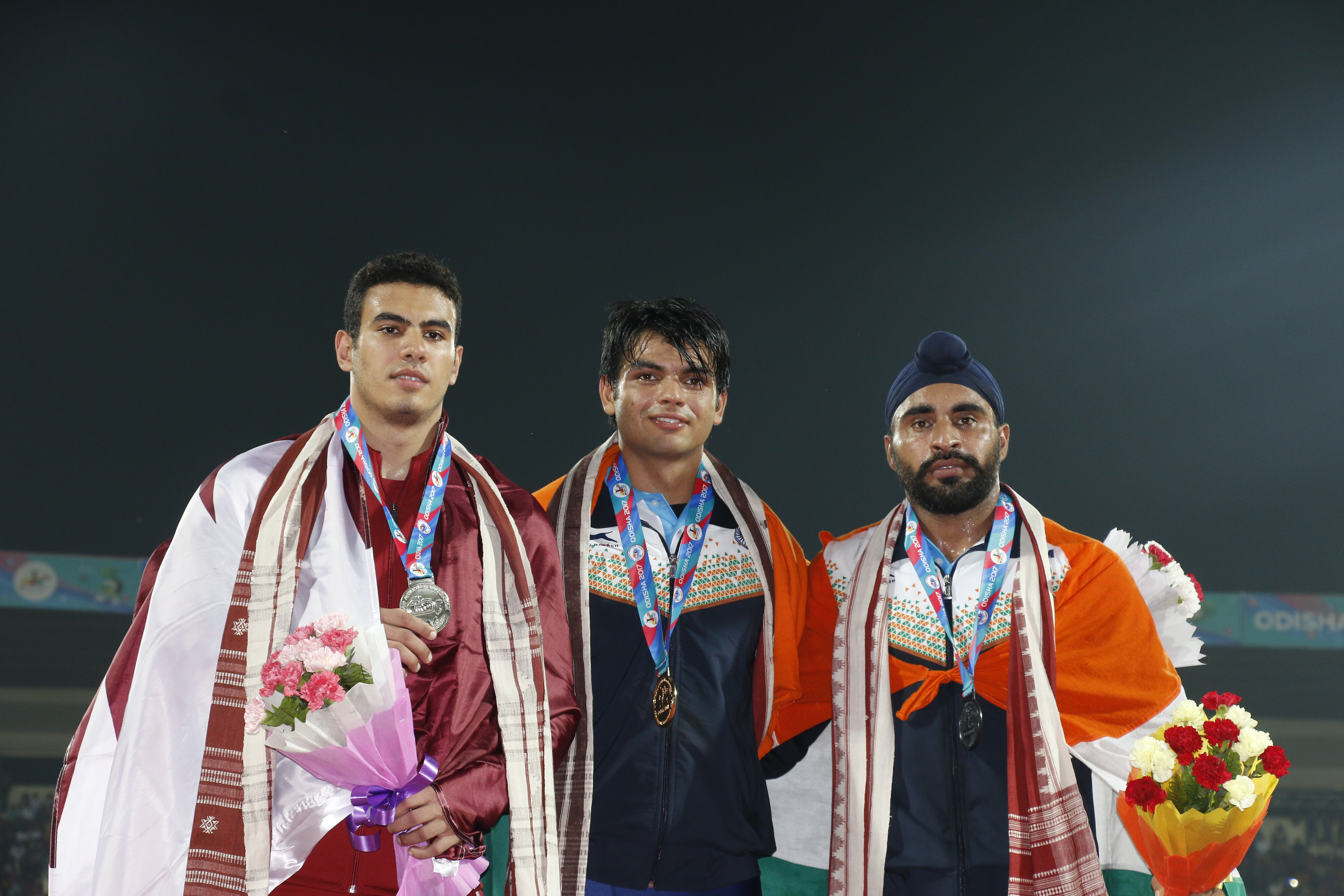
Chopra won the gold medal in the 2017 Asian Athletics Championships in Bhubaneshwar.

At the 2016 South Asian Games, Chopra achieved a new personal best when he won gold with a throw of 82.23 m (269.8 ft) in Guwahati on 9 February. After the event, he began training under Australian coach Gary Calvert, who was appointed as the national javelin coach. He also sustained a back injury in April 2016 during the Federation Cup in New Delhi, which affected his performance. In July 2016, he won the gold medal at the 2016 IAAF World U20 Championships in Bydgoszcz, Poland with a 86.48 m (283.7 ft) throw to set a new world junior record and became the first Indian to hold the national senior record and world junior record simultaneously. Although his record throw was above the qualification standard for the 2016 Olympics, he failed to qualify as the cut-off date had already elapsed. In September 2016, he left the Netaji Subhas Institute to train at the SAI centre in Bangalore. In December 2016, he was formally inducted as a Junior Commissioned Officer in the Indian Army. He was offered a rank of Naib Subedar in the Rajputana Rifles. (Note: Normally, the Indian Army does not appoint fresh recruits to this position, but Chopra was granted a special appointment because of his performance in sports.) He subsequently received extended leave to continue his training. He won gold in the 2017 Asian Athletics Championships at Bhubaneshwar with a throw of 85.23 m (279.6 ft).

=== Asian and Commonwealth champion (2017–2020) ===
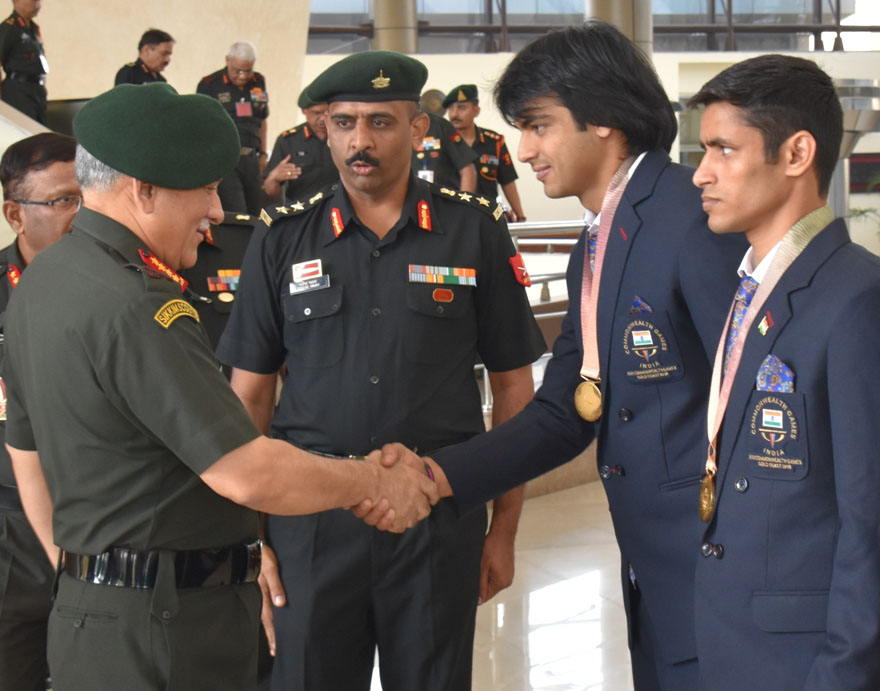
General Bipin Rawat, Chief of Army Staff, congratulating Neeraj Chopra (second from right) for his performance in the 2018 Commonwealth Games.

In the 2017 World Championships in August, Chopra finished 15th in the overall classification with a best throw of 82.26 m (269.9 ft). On 24 August, he suffered a groin injury during the Zürich Weltklasse. He sustained the injury during his third attempt of 83.39 m (273.6 ft) before he fouled his fourth attempt and skipped the last two. His first and best throw of 83.80 m (274.9 ft) gave him a seventh-place finish. He attributed his injury to a heavy schedule and the lack of a proper diet and rest. As a result of his injury, he withdrew from competition for the remainder of 2017. During recovery, he spent a month at the Joint Services Wing sports institute at Vijayanagar. In November 2017, he left for Offenburg in Germany to train with Werner Daniels, whom he had briefly worked with before the 2017 World Championships as his former coach Calvert had left India in May due to disputes over his contract. During his stay there, he focused on strength training and honed his technique with adjustments to his stance to keep his hand raised higher during throws to improve his range.

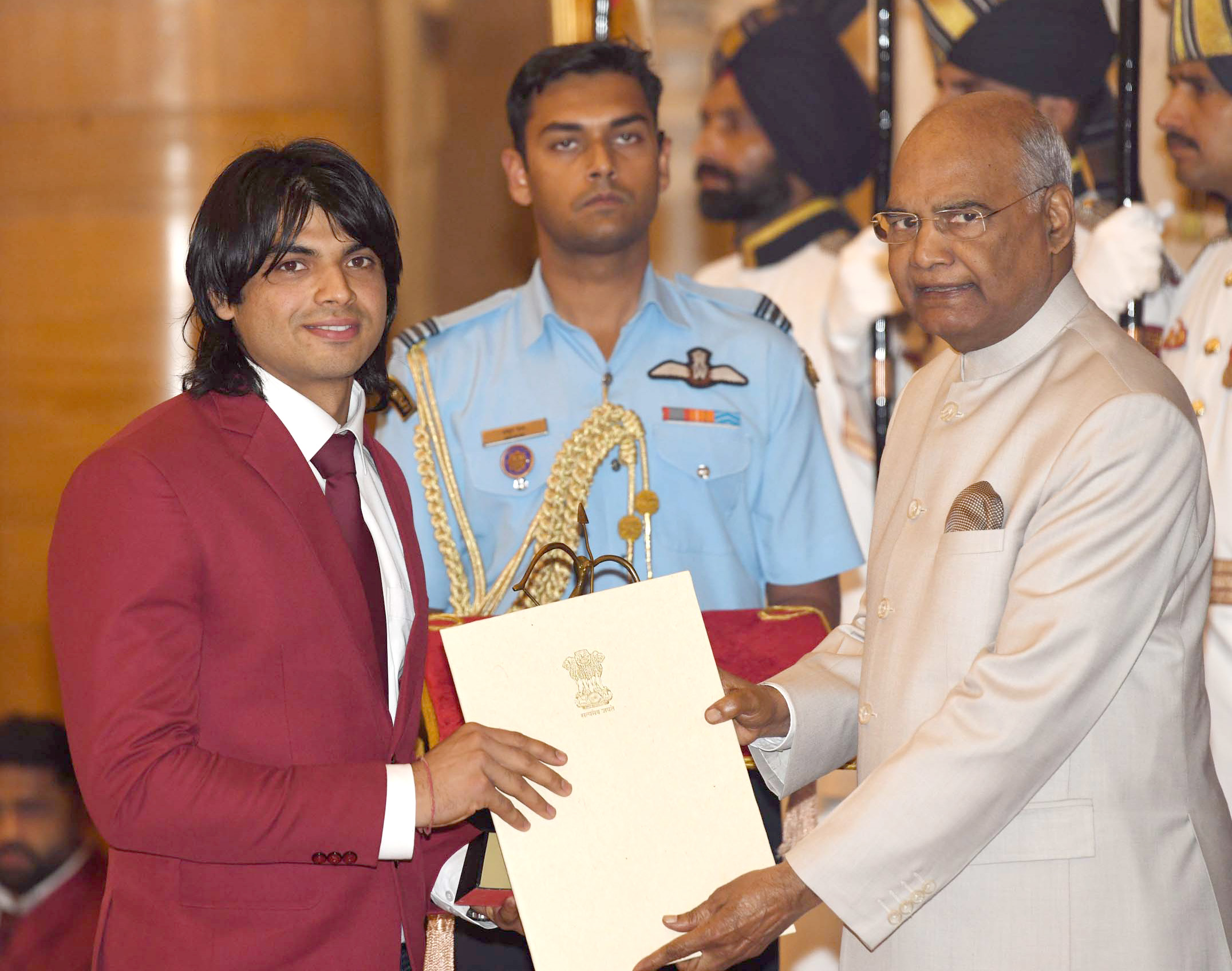
Chopra receiving the Arjuna Award from Ram Nath Kovind, President of India, on 25 September 2018

In the 2018 Commonwealth Games, Chopra registered a season-best effort of 86.47 m (283.7 ft) to win the gold medal. He became the first Indian to win the javelin throw at the Commonwealth Games. In May 2018, he bettered his national record at the Qatar Athletic Super Grand Prix with a throw of 87.43 m (286.8 ft). In August 2018, he made his debut at the Asian Games, and was the flag-bearer for India during the 2018 Asian Games Parade of Nations. On 27 August, he won the gold medal at the Games with a new Indian record throw of 88.06 m (288.9 ft). This was also India's first ever gold medal in the javelin throw at the Asian Games.

Chopra was the only track and field athlete that year to be recommended by the Athletics Federation of India (AFI) for the country's highest sports award, the Major Dhyanchand Khel Ratna. He was awarded the Arjuna Award in September 2018. The army rewarded him with an out-of-turn promotion to subedar in November. In preparation for the 2020 Tokyo Olympics, he trained with German coach Uwe Hohn, South African biomechanics expert Klaus Bartonietz and physiotherapist Ishaan Marwaha. Hohn worked on refining Chopra's throwing technique, which he described as "wild".

=== Injury and comeback (2019–2020) ===
Chopra missed the 2019 World Championships in Doha due to injury. On 3 May 2019, he underwent surgery to remove bone spurs in his right elbow in Mumbai. After a period of recuperation and rehabilitative training in Patiala and Vijayanagar, he travelled to South Africa in November 2019 to train under Bartonietz. After a 16-month hiatus, he returned to international competition in January 2020. He registered a throw of 87.86 m (288.3 ft) in the Central North West Athletics League Meeting in Potchefstroom, South Africa. This helped him achieve the automatic qualification standard of 85 m (279 ft) and secure a place for the 2020 Olympics. He travelled to Turkey for training, but was forced to return to India in March 2020 due to the COVID-19 pandemic.

Due to the pandemic and lockdown in India, Chopra spent the next year training at Patiala. In late 2020, the Athletics Federation of India and the Government of Odisha arranged a training camp at Kalinga Stadium in Bhubaneswar, which he attended from December 2020 to February 2021. On 5 March 2021, he again bettered his own national record with a throw of 88.07 m (288.9 ft), which ranked him third-best internationally for the season. He applied to travel to Sweden for training, but faced difficulties due to the effects of the pandemic. After weeks of attempting to secure a visa, he was cleared to travel to Europe with his coach following the intervention of the Ministry of Youth Affairs and Sports and the Ministry of External Affairs. He flew to Paris on 5 June 2021 for a mandatory quarantine period before travelling to Portugal for the Meeting Cidade de Lisboa. He opened his international season of 2021 there with a throw of 83.18 m (272.9 ft), which earned him the gold medal. He remained in Lisbon until 19 June before travelling to Uppsala in Sweden for training.

In June 2021, Chopra competed at the Karlstad GP in Karlstad, Sweden, which he won with a sub-par throw of 80.96 m (265.6 ft). He attributed his reduced performance to a tendency to throw the javelin higher than he wanted to, along with having to use a different javelin as his own was unavailable. He won bronze at a subsequent meet in Kuortane, Finland with a throw of 86.79 m (284.7 ft). Following the Kuortane Games, he travelled to Lucerne to compete in the Spitzen Leichtathletik Luzern, but decided to withdraw due to fatigue. Later, he attempted to secure a visa for the Diamond League meeting at Gateshead on 13 July, but faced difficulties due to the pandemic and instead continued training in Uppsala.

=== Olympics, World and Diamond League champion (2021–2024) ===
On 4 August 2021, Chopra made his debut at the Olympics. He topped his qualifying group with a throw of 86.65 m (284.3 ft) and achieved an automatic entry to the final. In the final on 7 August, he won the gold medal with a throw of 87.58 m (287.3 ft) in his second attempt. He became the first Indian athlete to win a gold medal in athletics, and the first post-independence Indian Olympic medalist in athletics. (Note: The International Olympic Committee and Indian Olympic Association officially recognise Norman Pritchard to have been the first Indian track and field Olympic medalist, having competed at the 1900 Paris Olympics, even though India was under British rule at that time. Pritchard won the first Olympic track and field medal in the 1900 Paris Olympics, competing in the 200 meter sprint and the 200 meter hurdles events. As British India did not officially gain representation within the Olympic Movement until 1920, he technically competed for Britain. However, the International Olympic Committee and the Athletics Federation of India officially regard him as having competed for India and credit his medals accordingly. Olympics historian and journalist Gulu Ezekiel observes that though Pritchard was an Englishman of English parentage, he was born in Calcutta and developed his abilities as a sprinter and hurdler while representing the Bengal Presidency in events within India.) He also became the second Indian to win an individual Olympic gold medal after Abhinav Bindra and the first Asian athlete to win an Olympic gold medal in javelin throw. He also became the youngest-ever Indian Olympic gold medalist in an individual event and the only individual to have won gold on his Olympic debut. His medal helped India register its best ever finish in the Olympic Games. He dedicated his win to sprinters Milkha Singh and P. T. Usha, both former Olympians from India. As a result of his performance, he reached the world number two ranking in the men's javelin throw.

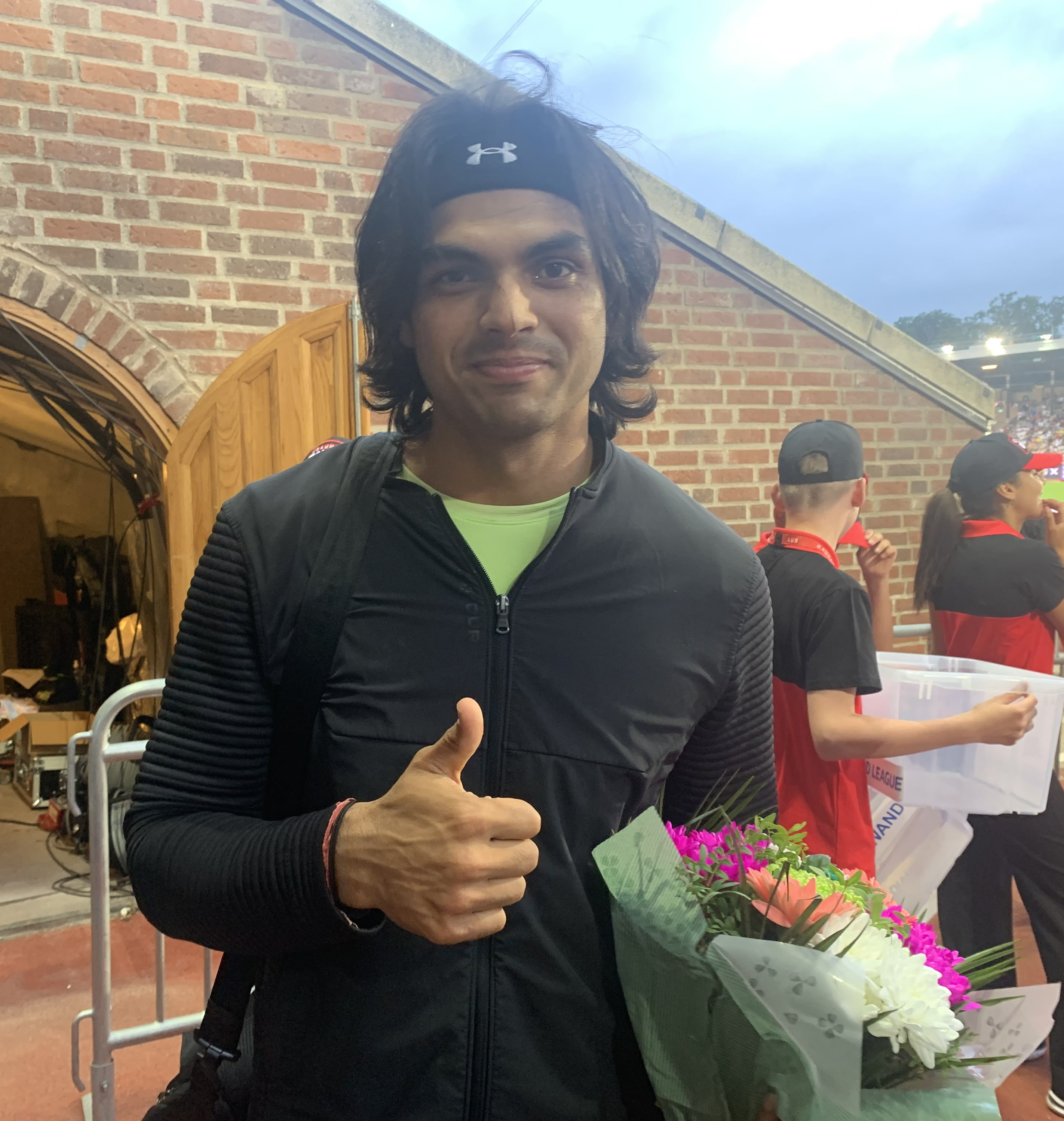
Chopra at the 2022 BAUHAUS-galan in Stockholm

In June 2022 at the Paavo Nurmi Games in Turku, Finland, he placed second with a new personal best of 89.30 m (293.0 ft) and registered another new national record. In the 2022 Diamond League, Chopra broke his own national record with a throw of 89.94 m (295.1 ft) during his second-place effort at the BAUHAUS-galan in Stockholm. In July 2022, he won the silver medal at the 2022 World Athletics Championships with a throw of 88.13 m (289.1 ft). This was India's second ever medal at the World Athletics Championships after long-jumper Anju Bobby George's bronze in 2003. On 26 August, he registered another first place at the Athletissima at Lausanne with a throw of 89.09 m (292.3 ft) and qualified for the Diamond League final at Weltklasse Zürich. On 8 September, he won the final with a throw of 88.44 m (290.2 ft) and became the first Indian to win the Diamond League in any event. In May 2023, he clinched the top spot in the Doha Diamond League with a throw of 88.67 m (290.9 ft). In the same month, he achieved the first position in the men's javelin throw rankings issued by World Athletics for the first time. In August 2023, he won the gold medal in 2023 World Athletics Championships with a throw of 88.17 m (289.3 ft). He became the first Asian to win gold in the javelin throw event at the World Championships. In October 2023, he won his second Asian Games gold medal in the 2022 Asian Games with a season-best throw of 88.88 m (291.6 ft).

=== Paris Olympics and Diamond League (2024) ===
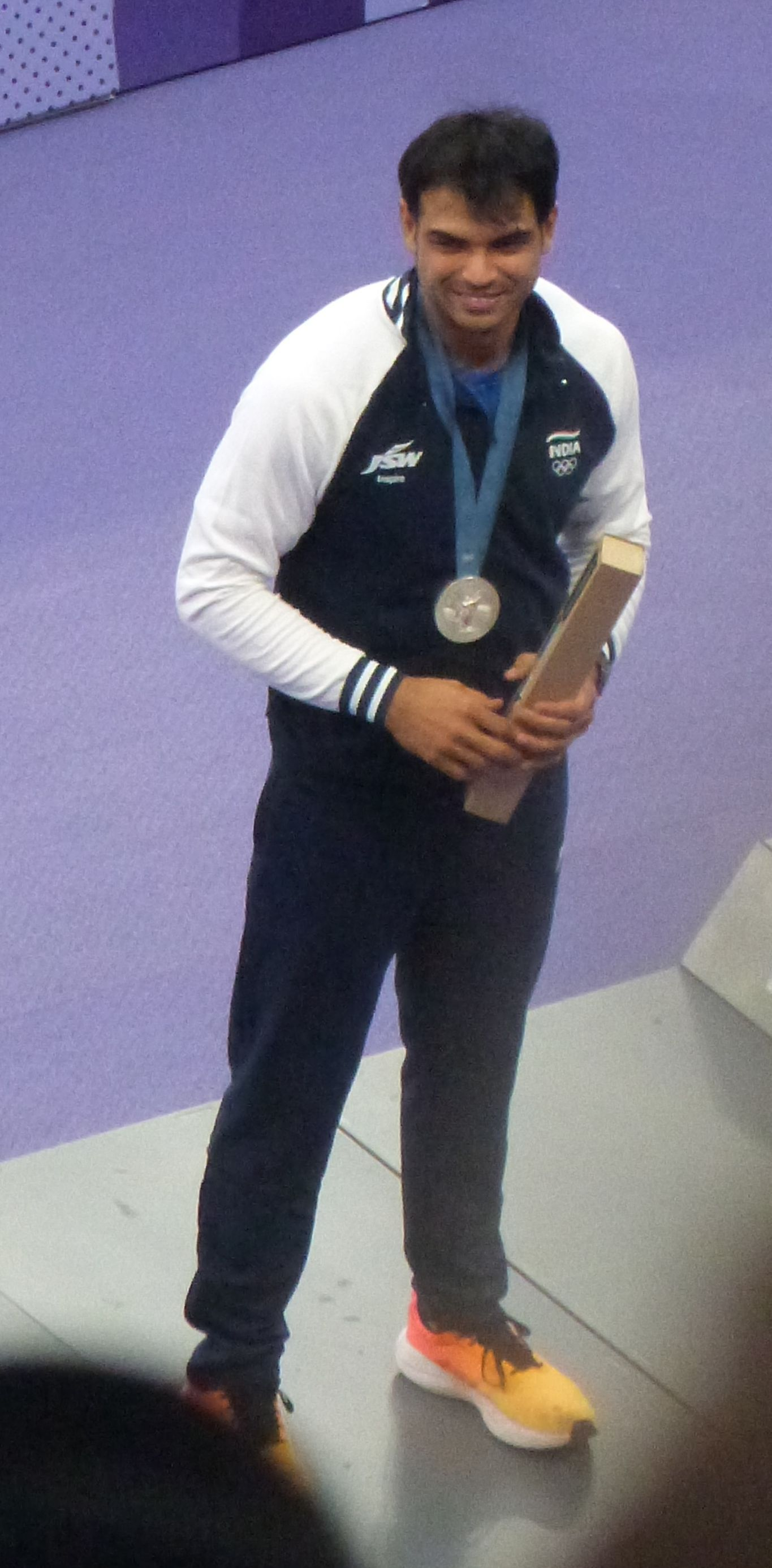
Neeraj Chopra awarded silver medal at 2024 Paris Olympics

Chopra qualified for the 2024 Paris Olympics by hitting the Olympic Qualifying Standard at the 2022 Asian Games. At the 2024 Doha Diamond League, he finished second with a throw of 88.36 m, just 2 cm short of Czech Republic's Jakub Vadlejch who topped the meet with a throw of 88.38m. He won gold at the Federation Cup with a throw of 82.27 m. He then participated at the 2024 Paavo Nurmi Games where he won the gold medal with a throw of 85.97 m.

Chopra then competed at the 2024 Paris Olympics. During the qualification round, he topped his group with a season-best throw of 89.34m. In the final, only his second attempt was a legitimate throw, but at 89.45m it was enough to win the silver medal. Following his gold at the 2020 Olympics, Chopra became the fifth individual multiple medallist for India and first to win a gold and silver combination. After the Olympics, he secured second place at the Lausanne meet, delivering a season-best throw of 89.49 meters. Chopra finished the season by finishing 2nd at the 2024 Diamond League.

=== 90m mark and NC Classic (2025–) ===
World Athletics announced a gold category javelin meet named Neeraj Chopra Classic, making it a key qualification event for the 2025 World Championships. At the Doha qualification meeting of the 2025 Diamond League, Chopra breached the long-awaited 90m mark by hitting 90.23 m. He topped the live results for the whole meet, till Julian Weber scored 91.06 m in his final throw, thus taking over the first position.

In May, Audi India announced Chopra as their brand ambassador. He then topped the Paris qualification meet of the 2025 Diamond League. His next appearance was at the Golden Spike Ostrava which he won. He proceeded to host and participate in Neeraj Chopra Classic. Chopra won the meet named after him. The event saw 15,000+ people in attendance at the Sree Kanteerava Stadium in Bengaluru. During the 2025 Diamond League final, he finished second, continuing his top two streak since 2021 and his podium finish streak since 2020. But that streak finally ended when he failed to reach the podium at the 2025 World Championships.

== Coaching history ==
Chopra has trained under several coaches, one of the earliest being Jaiveer Singh Chaudhary who coached him from 2010 to 2011. Naseem Ahmed came next and remained his coach from 2011 to 2016. Kashinath Naik was Chopra's briefest coach and trained him in 2016. Gary Calvert took over the reins from 2016 to 2017. He was coached by Uwe Hohn from 2018 to 2021.

Chopra's coaching under Klaus Bartonietz, from 2021 to 2024, resulted in several wins, titles, and gold medals. Since then he was being coached by Jan Železný until both parted their ways in early 2026. In 2026, Chopra reunited with Jaiveer Singh Chaudhary, who mentored him during his formative years.

Duration	Coach
2010–2011	(India) Jaiveer Singh Chaudhary
2011–2016	(India) Naseem Ahmed
2016	(India) Kashinath Naik
2016–2017	(Australia) Gary Calvert
2018–2021	(Germany) Uwe Hohn
2021–2024	(Germany) Klaus Bartonietz
2024–2026	(Czech Republic) Jan Železný
2026–present	(India) Jaiveer Singh Chaudhary

== Performance record ==
=== Tournaments ===
Representing India
Year	Tournament	Venue	Position	Result	Ref.
2013	U18 World Championships	Donetsk, Ukraine	19th	66.75m	
2015	Asian Championships	Wuhan, China	9th	70.50m	
2016	South Asian Games	Guwahati, India	1st	82.23m	
2016	U20 Asian Championships	Ho Chi Minh City, Vietnam	2nd	77.60m	
2016	U20 World Championships	Bydgoszcz, Poland	1st	86.48m WU20R	
2017	Asian Championships	Bhubaneswar, India	1st	85.23m	
2017	World Championships	London, United Kingdom	15th	82.26m	
2018	Commonwealth Games	Gold Coast, Australia	1st	86.47m	
2018	Asian Games	Jakarta, Indonesia	1st	88.06m	
2021	Olympic Games	Tokyo, Japan	1st	87.58m	
2022	World Championships	Eugene, United States	2nd	88.13m	
2023	World Championships	Budapest, Hungary	1st	88.17m	
2023	Asian Games	Hangzhou, China	1st	88.88m	
2024	Olympic Games	Paris, France	2nd	89.45m	
2025	World Championships	Tokyo, Japan	8th	84.03m	
2026	Commonwealth Games	Glasgow, Scotland	2nd	85.83m	

=== Diamond League ===
Year	Meeting	Round	Result	Ref
2022	Doha Diamond League	Qualification	DNP	
2022	BAUHAUS-galan	Qualification	2nd	
2022	Kamila Skolimowska Memorial	Qualification	DNP	
2022	Athletissima	Qualification	1st	
2022	Weltklasse Zürich	Final	Winner	
2023	Doha Diamond League	Qualification	1st	
2023	Athletissima	Qualification	1st	
2023	Herculis	Qualification	DNP	
2023	Weltklasse Zürich	Qualification	2nd	
2023	Prefontaine Classic	Final	2nd	
2024	Doha Diamond League	Qualification	2nd	
2024	Meeting de Paris	Qualification	DNP	
2024	Athletissima	Qualification	2nd	
2024	Weltklasse Zürich	Qualification	DNP	
2024	Memorial Van Damme	Final	2nd	
2025	Doha Diamond League	Qualification	2nd	
2025	Meeting de Paris	Qualification	1st	
2025	Kamila Skolimowska Memorial	Qualification	DNP	
2025	Memorial Van Damme	Qualification	DNP	
2025	Weltklasse Zürich	Final	2nd	
2026	Meeting de Rabat	Qualification	DNP	
2026	Golden Gala	Qualification	DNP	
2026	Doha Diamond League	Qualification	4th	
2026	Athletissima	Qualification	2nd	
2026	Weltklasse Zürich	Qualification	DNP	
2026	Memorial Van Damme	Final	DNP	

=== Invitational meets ===
Year	Tournament	Venue	Position	Result	Ref.
2018	Sotteville Athletics Meet	France	1st	85.17 m	
2018	Savo Games	Finland	1st	85.69 m	
2021	Meeting Cidade de Lisboa	Portugal	1st	83.18 m	
2021	Folksam Grand Prix	Sweden	1st	80.96 m	
2021	Kuortane Games	Finland	3rd	86.79 m	
2022	Kuortane Games	Finland	1st	86.69 m	
2024	Paavo Nurmi Games	Finland	1st	85.97 m	
2025	Potchefstroom Invitational	South Africa	1st	84.52 m	
2025	Janusz Kusociński Memorial	Poland	2nd	84.14 m	
2025	Golden Spike Ostrava	Czech Republic	1st	85.29 m	
2025	Neeraj Chopra Classic	India	1st	86.18 m	

=== Seasonal bests ===
Year	Date	Location	Performance	Notes
2013	26 July	Thiruvananthapuram, India	69.66 m	
2014	17 August	Patiala, India	70.19 m	
2015	31 December	Patiala, India	81.04 m	
2016	23 July	Bydgoszcz, Poland	86.48 m	WJR WU20R
2017	2 June	Patiala, India	85.63 m	
2018	27 August	Jakarta, Indonesia	88.06 m	
2020	28 January	Potchefstroom, South Africa	87.86 m	
2021	5 March	Patiala, India	88.07 m	
2022	30 June	Stockholm, Sweden	89.94 m	
2023	4 October	Hangzhou, China	88.88 m	
2024	22 August	Lausanne, Switzerland	89.49 m	
2025	16 May	Doha, Qatar	90.23 m	NR
2026	21 August	Lausanne, Switzerland	88.05 m	

Source: World Athletics

== Army ranks ==
Insignia	Rank	Component	Duration	Ref
	Naib Subedar	Indian Army	2016–2021	
	Subedar	Indian Army	2021–2024	
	Subedar Major	Indian Army	2024–2025	
	Lieutenant Colonel	Indian Army	2025–present	

== Recognition and honours ==
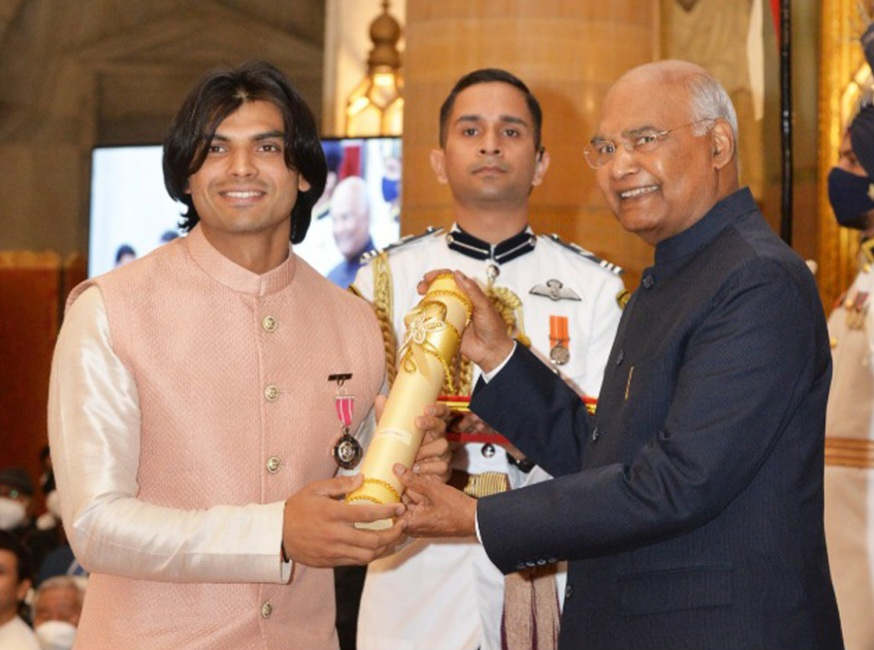
Ram Nath Kovind, the President of India at the time, presenting the Padma Shri to Chopra in 2022.

=== National Civilian and Military honours ===
Year	Honour	Ribbon	Ref
2022	Param Vishisht Seva Medal		
2022	Padma Shri		
2022	Vishisht Seva Medal		
2022	75th Independence Anniversary Medal		

=== Other Distinguish honours ===
Year	Honour		Notes	Ref
2021	Army Sports Institute Stadium, Pune	Renamed Neeraj Chopra Stadium	By Rajnath Singh	
2021	Vogue India	Man of the Year	First Male Athlete To Star On The Cover	
2022	Switzerland Tourism	Appointed Indian Ambassador		
2025	Track & Field News	Best Male Javelin Thrower		
2025	World Athletics Gold Event	Neeraj Chopra Classic	International Javelin Meet	
2025	Audi India	Brand Ambassador		
2025	The Economic Times	40 Under 40 List		

== Awards and nominations ==
Year	Award	Category	Result	Ref(s)
2017	Indian Sports Honours	Sportsman of the Year	Nominated	
2017	Indian Sports Honours	Emerging Sportsman of the Year	Won	
2018	Arjuna Award	Outstanding Performance in Sports and Games	Won	
2019	Indian Sports Honours	Sportsman of the Year	Nominated	
2019	Indian Sports Honours	Spirit of Sport Honour	Nominated	
2021	Khel Ratna Award	Spectacular Performance in the Field of Sports	Won	
2021	Times of India Sports Awards	Male Athlete of the Year	Won	
2022	Laureus World Sports Award	Laureus World Sports Award for Breakthrough of the Year	Nominated	
2022	Sportstar Awards	Sportstar of the Year Male	Won	
2022	Sportstar Awards	Sportstar of the Year Track and Field	Won	
2022	Indian of the Year Awards	Indian of the Year in Sports	Won	
2023	Sportstar Awards	Sportstar of the Year Male	Won	
2023	Indian Sports Honours	Sportsman of the Year	Won	
2023	Indian Sports Honours	Comeback of the Year	Won	
2023	Times of India Sports Awards	Male Athlete of the Year	Won	
2023	Times of India Sports Awards	Sportsperson of the Year	Won	
2023	World Athletics Awards	Athlete of the Year	Nominated	
2024	Indian of the Year Awards	Indian of the Year in Sports	Won	
2024	Young Leaders Awards	Youth Icon of the Year	Won	
2024	Indian Sports Honours	Sportsman of the Year	Won	
2024	Sportstar Awards	Sportstar of the Year Male	Won	

== See also ==
- Athletics in India
- Athletics Federation of India
- Javelin throw at the Olympics
- India at the Olympics
- India at the 2020 Summer Olympics
- Sports in Haryana

== Notes ==
Records
Preceded by (Latvia) Zigismunds Sirmais	World Junior Record Holder; 23 July 2016 – present	Incumbent
