= Egypt at the World Athletics Championships =

- Flag of Egypt
- WA code: EGY
- Medals: Gold 0 Silver 1 Bronze 0 Total 1

World Athletics Championships appearances (overview)
- 1983; 1987; 1991; 1993; 1995; 1997; 1999; 2001; 2003; 2005; 2007; 2009; 2011; 2013; 2015; 2017; 2019; 2022; 2023; 2025

Egypt has taken part in all editions of the World Athletics Championships, having to this date only won a silver medal in 2015 by Ihab Abdelrahman in the men's javelin throw.

== Medalists ==
Medal	Name	Year	Event
Silver	Ihab Abdelrahman	2015 Beijing	Men's javelin throw

=== By event ===
Event	Gold	Silver	Bronze	Total
Javelin throw	0	1	0	1
Totals (1 entries)	0	1	0	1

=== By gender ===
Gender	Gold	Silver	Bronze	Total
Women	0	1	0	1
Men	0	0	0	0

== See also ==
- Egypt at the Olympics
- Egypt at the Paralympics
