= 2016 IAAF World U20 Championships – Men's javelin throw =

The men's javelin throw event at the 2016 IAAF World U20 Championships was held at Zdzisław Krzyszkowiak Stadium on 22 and 23 July.

== Medalists ==
Gold	Neeraj Chopra; India
Silver	Johan Grobler; South Africa
Bronze	Anderson Peters; Grenada

== Records ==
Standing records prior to the 2016 IAAF World U20 Championships in Athletics
World Junior Record	Zigismunds Sirmais (LAT)	84.69	Bauska, Latvia	22 June 2011
Championship Record	John Robert Oosthuizen (RSA)	83.07	Beijing, China	19 August 2006
World Junior Leading	Neeraj Chopra (IND)	82.23	Guwahati, India	10 February 2016

== Results ==
=== Qualification ===
Qualification: 72.50 (Q) or at least 12 best performers (q) qualified for the final.

Rank	Group	Name	Nationality	#1	#2	#3	Result	Note
1	A	Neeraj Chopra	India	78.20			78.20	Q
2	A	Anderson Peters	Grenada	72.39	76.20		76.20	Q
3	B	Márk Xavér Schmölcz	Hungary	71.48	70.01	74.80	74.80	Q, PB
4	B	Johan Grobler	South Africa	70.57	74.79		74.79	Q
5	A	Cyprian Mrzygłód	Poland	74.48			74.48	Q
6	B	Harry Hughes	Great Britain	65.03	74.30		74.30	Q
7	A	Patriks Gailums	Latvia	74.02			74.02	Q, PB
8	A	Zakhar Mishchenko	Ukraine	73.95			73.95	Q
9	B	Alexandru Novac	Romania	73.35			73.35	Q
10	B	Emin Öncel	Turkey	73.33			73.33	Q
11	A	Lukas Moutarde	France	71.84	69.23	73.18	73.18	Q, PB
12	B	Valery Izotau	Belarus	67.88	x	72.76	72.76	Q
13	B	Junya Sado	Japan	72.65			72.65	Q
14	A	James Whiteaker	Great Britain	72.51			72.51	Q, PB
15	A	Xu Jiajie	China	69.49	72.02	x	72.02	SB
16	B	Vladislav Palyunin	Uzbekistan	70.38	x	71.54	71.54	PB
17	B	Simon Litzell	Sweden	x	69.77	71.05	71.05	
18	B	Xiang Jiabo	China	63.30	69.87	70.90	70.90	
19	A	Aliaksei Katkavets	Belarus	67.01	70.43	x	70.43	
20	A	Matthew Rees	Australia	x	68.57	69.82	69.82	PB
21	B	Manu Quijera	Spain	68.30	68.23	68.91	68.91	
22	A	Erich Wiese	South Africa	68.61	67.99	65.93	68.61	
23	A	Denis Picus	Moldova	68.57	66.34	x	68.57	
24	B	Mateusz Zabłocki	Poland	64.21	68.32	65.08	68.32	
25	B	Conor Warren	Australia	65.55	68.31	67.19	68.31	
26	B	Norman Plischke	Germany	x	x	68.00	68.00	
27	A	Pedro Luiz Barros	Brazil	67.75	64.95	67.97	67.97	
28	A	Hudson Keffer	United States	67.76	66.11	67.58	67.76	
29	B	Modestas Masteika	Lithuania	x	x	67.36	67.36	
30	A	Arshad Nadeem	Pakistan	x	63.35	67.17	67.17	
31	A	Hiroshi Ikegawa	Japan	x	62.89	66.01	66.01	
32	A	Lee Ji-hwan	South Korea	64.36	63.09	65.63	65.63	
33	B	Oleksandr Kozubskyi	Ukraine	x	65.34	60.15	65.34	
34	A	Odei Jainaga	Spain	63.63	63.20	63.02	63.63	
35	B	Thomas Peters	United States	x	62.76	x	62.76	
	B	Gaurav Yadav	India				DNS	

=== Final ===
Rank	Name	Nationality	#1	#2	#3	#4	Result	Note
1st place, gold medalist(s)	Neeraj Chopra	India	79.66	86.48	78.36	x	86.48	WU20R
2nd place, silver medalist(s)	Johan Grobler	South Africa	80.59	69.01	x	75.16	80.59	PB
3rd place, bronze medalist(s)	Anderson Peters	Grenada	79.51	79.65	75.12	76.95	79.65	NU20R
4	Emin Öncel	Turkey	75.20	73.65	x	x	75.20	
5	Alexandru Novac	Romania	71.95	72.91	x	x	72.91	
6	Márk Xavér Schmölcz	Hungary	72.66	66.07	70.55	69.87	72.66	
7	Harry Hughes	Great Britain	66.82	72.22	70.42		72.22	
8	Zakhar Mishchenko	Ukraine	71.21	67.44	66.50		71.21	
9	Cyprian Mrzygłód	Poland	68.46	69.58	70.48		70.48	
10	Lukas Moutarde	France	68.06	65.27	66.53		68.06	
11	Patriks Gailums	Latvia	63.61	66.84	66.57		66.84	
12	Valery Izotau	Belarus	66.40	63.46	r		66.40	
13	James Whiteaker	Great Britain	65.39	64.28	62.88		65.39	
14	Junya Sado	Japan	64.04	62.61	56.76		64.04	
