= 2026 African Championships in Athletics – Men's javelin throw =

Men's javelin throw at the 2026 African Championships in Athletics
- Venue: Legon Sports Stadium
- Location: Accra, Ghana
- Dates: 17 May
- Competitors: 7 from 5 nations
- Winning time: 79.87

Medalists
gold medal	Julius Yego	Kenya
silver medal	Otag Ubang	Ethiopia
bronze medal	Douw Smit	South Africa

The men's javelin throw event at the 2026 African Championships in Athletics was held on 17 May in Accra, Ghana.

== Results ==
Rank	Athlete	Nationality	#1	#2	#3	#4	#5	#6	Result	Notes
1st place, gold medalist(s)	Julius Yego	Kenya	76.98	79.87	x	x	78.87	76.45	79.87	
2nd place, silver medalist(s)	Otag Ubang	Ethiopia	70.49	77.60	76.37	66.00	68.97	–	77.60	
3rd place, bronze medalist(s)	Douw Smit	South Africa	67.05	71.89	72.86	75.84	76.00	x	76.00	
4	Samuel Kure	Nigeria	71.65	71.00	71.51	70.88	70.27	75.54	75.54	
5	Righardt Stander	South Africa	70.21	72.67	73.94	66.61	70.75	67.63	73.94	
6	Alex Toroitich Kiprotich	Kenya	x	73.19	71.20	69.96	x	x	73.19	
7	Sisamu Nayoya	Zambia	65.27	x	62.82	60.35	x	61.42	65.27	
	Moustafa Mahmoud	Egypt							DNS	
	Ignace Ebana	Republic of the Congo							DNS	
	Achock Ujilu	Ethiopia							DNS	
