= Julius Yego =

Kenyan javelin thrower (born 1989)

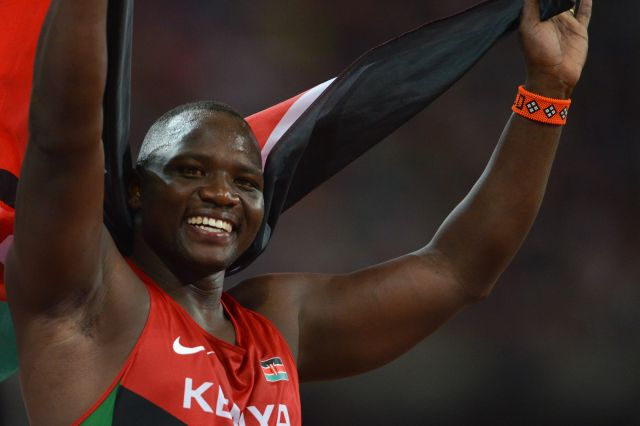
- Yego in 2015

Personal information
- Full name: Julius Kiplagat Yego
- Nickname: Mr. YouTube
- Born: 4 January 1989 (age 37) Cheptonon, Rift Valley Province, Kenya
- Height: 175 cm (5 ft 9 in)
- Weight: 85 kg (187 lb)

Sport
- Country: Kenya
- Sport: Track and field
- Event: Javelin throw
- Coached by: Petteri Piironen

Achievements and titles
- Personal bests: AR 92.72 m (2015)
Medal record
Men's athletics
Representing Kenya
Olympic Games
Silver medal – second place	2016 Rio de Janeiro	Javelin throw
World Championships
Gold medal – first place	2015 Beijing	Javelin throw
Commonwealth Games
Gold medal – first place	2014 Glasgow	Javelin throw
Bronze medal – third place	2022 Birmingham	Javelin throw
African Games
Gold medal – first place	2011 Maputo	Javelin throw
Gold medal – first place	2019 Rabat	Javelin throw
Silver medal – second place	2023 Accra	Javelin throw
African Championships
Gold medal – first place	2012 Porto-Novo	Javelin throw
Gold medal – first place	2014 Marrakesh	Javelin throw
Gold medal – first place	2018 Asaba	Javelin throw
Gold medal – first place	2022 Port Louis	Javelin throw
Gold medal – first place	2024 Douala	Javelin throw
Gold medal – first place	2026 Accra	Javelin throw
Bronze medal – third place	2010 Nairobi	Javelin throw

Julius Kiplagat Yego (born 4 January 1989) is a Kenyan track and field athlete who competes in the javelin throw. Nicknamed "Mr. YouTube" because he learned how to throw by watching YouTube videos of javelin athletes, Yego is the African record holder for the event with a personal best of 92.72 m.

He won the javelin title at the All-Africa Games in 2011 and at the African Championships in Athletics in 2012 and 2014; at the 2013 World Championships he placed fourth, losing a medal in the final round. In 2014, he became the first Kenyan to win a Commonwealth Games gold medal in a field event. At the 2015 World Championships he won the gold medal with a throw of 92.72 m, becoming the first Kenyan to win a World Championships gold medal in a field event. He won silver at the 2016 Summer Olympics in Rio de Janeiro.

== Biography ==
Yego was born in Cheptonon (Soba River) location in Tinderet, Nandi District (today Nandi County). He attended high school at Kapsabet Boys High School.

Yego became interested in the javelin throw as a youth and later he watched videos of athletes such as Jan Železný and Andreas Thorkildsen on YouTube to help with his technique and to learn how to train at a gym. He competed in the high school regional championships in 2003. In 2006 he won the national junior title and broke the Kenyan junior record with a throw of 67 metres. More renowned for distance runners, Yego quickly ascended to the top of the Kenyan scene. He won his first national title in the javelin at the age of nineteen in 2008 and defended it in both 2009 and 2010.

He earned his first national call up in 2010 and threw a personal best of 74.51 m to take the bronze medal at the 2010 African Championships in Athletics, which was held in Nairobi. He improved his best to 75.44 m at the Kenyan Commonwealth trials. He travelled to New Delhi for the 2010 Commonwealth Games and ended the competition in seventh place with a best throw of 69.60 m. In 2011 he still did not have a throwing coach, due to the lack of popularity of the event in Kenya. Despite this, he won a fourth straight Kenyan title then went to the 2011 All-Africa Games and became Kenya's first ever champion in the event, throwing a Kenyan national record mark of 78.34 m. This bettered Paul Lagat's fourteen-year-old national record (78.20 m). In respect of this achievement the IAAF (the sport's governing body) gave Yego a six-month scholarship to train alongside elite javelin coaches in Europe, with the aim of preparing him for the 2012 London Olympics.

After two months of training at the IAAF-accredited centre in Kuortane, Finland, Yego returned to Kenya in April 2012 and threw a new record of 79.95 m. This was within the Olympic "B" standard for the event and gained him the prospect of becoming the first Kenyan person to compete in the javelin at the Olympics. He improved the Kenyan record at Finnish Elite Games Series event in Kuortane on 22 July 2012, Finland throwing 81.12 metres During the London 2012 Olympics qualifying round, he broke his own national record by 69 cm, to make it 81.81 m. That throw was enough to send him into the final, where he placed 12th.

At the 2013 World Championships in Moscow Yego placed fourth, improving his Kenyan record by more than three metres to 85.40 m. He was the first Kenyan ever to qualify for a field event final at the World Championships, and was in bronze medal position until Russia's Dmitriy Tarabin passed him on his last throw. Track & Field News ranked Yego fifth in the world that year, the first time he'd been ranked in the top 10.

Yego won the javelin at the 2014 Commonwealth Games, beating the reigning Olympic champion, Keshorn Walcott, with a distance of 83.87 m. Yego was the first Kenyan athlete to win a Commonwealth title in a field event. He won a second gold later that summer at the African Championships, throwing a season best 84.72 m and defeating world leader Ihab Abdelrahman El-Sayed of Egypt.

Yego continued his rise in 2015, winning the Ostrava Golden Spike javelin on 26 May with a new Kenyan record of 86.88 m after his best throw was not flagged as a foul by the judges even though his hand touched the line. On 4 June he improved to 87.71 m at the Golden Gala in Rome, placing second behind Vítězslav Veselý. Three days later, Yego won at the British Grand Prix in Birmingham, overtaking Veselý in the last round with a massive throw of 91.39 m; the throw was originally ruled a narrow sector foul, but after his coach requested a remeasurement of the sector angle, the original sector was found to not have been wide enough and the ruling was overturned. Yego's throw was a new African record, and the best in the world since 2006. On 26 August Yego won the gold medal at 2015 World Championships with a throw of 92.72m. At the 2016 Summer Olympics in Rio de Janeiro, Yego won silver with a throw of 88.24 m, despite only throwing once after picking up a right ankle injury.

== International competition record ==
Year	Competition	Venue	Position	Notes
Representing Kenya
2010	African Championships	Nairobi, Kenya	3rd	74.51 m
2010	Commonwealth Games	New Delhi, India	7th	69.60 m
2011	All-Africa Games	Maputo, Mozambique	1st	78.34 m (NR)
2012	African Championships	Porto-Novo, Benin	1st	76.68 m
2012	Olympic Games	London, United Kingdom	12th	77.15 m
2013	World Championships	Moscow, Russia	4th	85.40 m (NR)
2014	Commonwealth Games	Glasgow, United Kingdom	1st	83.87 m
2014	African Championships	Marrakesh, Morocco	1st	84.72 m
2015	World Championships	Beijing, China	1st	92.72 m (AR)
2016	Olympic Games	Rio de Janeiro, Brazil	2nd	88.24 m
2017	World Championships	London, United Kingdom	13th	76.29 m
2018	Commonwealth Games	Gold Coast, Australia	13th (q)	74.55 m
2018	African Championships	Asaba, Nigeria	1st	77.34 m
2019	African Games	Rabat, Morocco	1st	87.73 m
2019	World Championships	Doha, Qatar	8th (q)	83.86 m^{1}
2021	Olympic Games	Tokyo, Japan	24th (q)	77.34 m
2022	African Championships	Port Louis, Mauritius	1st	79.62 m
2022	World Championships	Eugene, United States	14th (q)	79.60 m
2022	Commonwealth Games	Birmingham, United Kingdom	3rd	85.70 m
2023	World Championships	Budapest, Hungary	17th (q)	78.42 m
2024	African Games	Accra, Ghana	2nd	81.74 m
2024	African Championships	Douala, Cameroon	1st	80.24 m
2024	Olympic Games	Paris, France	5th	87.72 m
2025	World Championships	Tokyo, Japan	6th	85.54 m
2026	African Championships	Accra, Ghana	1st	79.87 m
2026	Commonwealth Games	Glasgow, United Kingdom	13th (q)	74.50 m
2026	World Athletics Ultimate Championship	Budapest, Hungary	6th	80.23 m

^{1}No mark in the final

== Seasonal bests by year ==
- 2009 – 74.00
- 2010 – 75.44
- 2011 – 78.34
- 2012 – 81.81
- 2013 – 85.40
- 2014 – 84.72
- 2015 – 92.72
- 2016 – 88.24
- 2017 – 87.97
- 2018 – 80.91
- 2019 – 87.73
- 2021 - 77.34
- 2022 - 85.70

== Personal life ==
Yego is married to Sincy Chemutai. They have two sons, Jarvis and Finn.

Records
Preceded by Ihab El-Sayed	Men's Javelin African Record Holder; 7 June 2015 – present	Incumbent
