= Johan Grobler =

South African javelin thrower

Johan Grobler (born 6 August 1997) is a South African javelin thrower.

== Career ==
Having won his first South African Junior Championships in 2016, he exceeded 80 metres for the first time in 2016, throwing 80.59 at the 2016 World U20 Championships to win the silver medal. He was coached by Terseus Liebenberg, who also coached the female silver medalist Jo-Ané van Dyk.

hee competed at the 2017 Universiade without reaching the final, finished fourth at the 2018 Athletics World Cup, fourth at the 2018 African Championships, fifth at the 2019 Universiade, won his first South African Championships in 2022, finished fourth at the 2022 African Championships and competed at the 2022 World Championships without reaching the final.

Grobler would only manage to surpass 80 metres two more times, first with 80.32 at the 2021 South African Championships where he finished runner-up, and lastly with 80.37 metres in June 2021 in Kladno. In 2023 and 2024 he seldomly managed to surpass the 70 metre mark.
