= Egypt at the 2023 World Athletics Championships =

- Flag of Egypt
- WA code: EGY

in Budapest, Hungary 19 August 2023 – 27 August 2023
- Competitors: 6 (4 men and 2 women)
- Medals: Gold 0 Silver 0 Bronze 0 Total 0

World Athletics Championships appearances (overview)
- 1983; 1987; 1991; 1993; 1995; 1997; 1999; 2001; 2003; 2005; 2007; 2009; 2011; 2013; 2015; 2017; 2019; 2022; 2023; 2025

Egypt competed at the 2023 World Athletics Championships in Budapest, Hungary, from 19 to 27 August 2023.

== Results ==
Egypt entered 6 athletes.

Key

- Q = Qualified for the next round
- q = Qualified for the next round as a fastest loser or, in field events, by position without achieving the qualifying target
- NR = National record
- PB = Personal best
- SB = Season best
- N/A = Round not applicable for the event

=== Men ===
Field events

Athlete	Event	Qualification		Final	
Athlete	Event	Distance	Position	Distance	Position
Mohamed Magdi Hamza	Shot put	20.68	14	Did not advance	
Mostafa Amr Hassan	Shot put	20.81	11 q	20.17	10
Mostafa El Gamel	Hammer throw	71.36	28	Did not advance	
Ihab Abdelrahman	Javelin throw	80.75	8 q	80.64	10

=== Women ===
Field events

Athlete	Event	Qualification		Final	
Athlete	Event	Distance	Position	Distance	Position
Esraa Owis	Long jump	6.16	32	Did not advance	
