= 2006 World Junior Championships in Athletics – Men's javelin throw =

The men's javelin throw event at the 2006 World Junior Championships in Athletics was held in Beijing, China, at Chaoyang Sports Centre on 16 and 19 August.

== Medalists ==
Gold	John Oosthuizen; South Africa
Silver	Ari Mannio; Finland
Bronze	Roman Avramenko; Ukraine

== Results ==
=== Final ===
19 August

Rank	Name	Nationality	Attempts						Result	Notes
Rank	Name	Nationality	1	2	3	4	5	6	Result	Notes
1st place, gold medalist(s)	John Oosthuizen	South Africa	78.52	83.07	79.89	79.58	x	x	83.07	
2nd place, silver medalist(s)	Ari Mannio	Finland	75.97	74.46	73.83	75.39	72.15	77.26	77.26	
3rd place, bronze medalist(s)	Roman Avramenko	Ukraine	76.01	x	75.80	75.47	75.50	74.90	76.01	
4	Víctor Fatecha	Paraguay	75.64	73.68	75.39	x	71.35	x	75.64	
5	Li Yu	China	74.46	68.83	70.97	75.35	x	72.13	75.35	
6	Yervásios Filippídis	Greece	69.10	63.13	73.58	72.73	x	x	73.58	
7	Leslie Copeland	Fiji	68.83	71.66	73.13	71.39	71.20	69.68	73.13	
8	James Campbell	United Kingdom	71.07	65.94	68.96	68.86	67.70	69.92	71.07	
9	Mikko Kankaanpää	Finland	66.86	71.01	x				71.01	
10	Noël Meyer	South Africa	70.06	x	70.39				70.39	
11	Loic Lemaître	Belgium	69.32	x	67.84				69.32	
12	Ioánnis Smaliós	Greece	x	63.45	61.52				63.45	

=== Qualifications ===
16 August

==== Group A ====
Rank	Name	Nationality	Attempts			Result	Notes
Rank	Name	Nationality	1	2	3	Result	Notes
1	Ari Mannio	Finland	68.35	x	74.17	74.17	Q
2	Víctor Fatecha	Paraguay	65.69	73.03	-	73.03	Q
3	Noël Meyer	South Africa	67.04	66.57	71.52	71.52	Q
4	Leslie Copeland	Fiji	67.21	67.94	69.62	69.62	q
5	Ioánnis Smaliós	Greece	65.73	64.31	69.58	69.58	q
6	Mohamed Ali Kebabou	Tunisia	63.47	66.62	69.20	69.20	
7	Nathan Burgess	Australia	62.75	68.12	66.88	68.12	
8	Petr Frydrych	Czech Republic	67.84	x	66.23	67.84	
9	Wang Qingbo	China	63.96	67.74	62.91	67.74	
10	Abdullah Al-Ameeri	Kuwait	63.96	63.97	66.28	66.28	
11	Ignacio Guerra	Chile	65.61	x	64.09	65.61	
12	Paweł Rakoczy	Poland	63.57	x	64.49	64.49	
13	Thomas Lange	Germany	63.88	61.56	x	63.88	
14	Tedy Draksler	Slovenia	59.58	x	63.75	63.75	
15	Khamis Al-Qatiti	Oman	63.20	62.81	x	63.20	
16	Maris Žvirinš	Latvia	55.31	61.92	62.62	62.62	
17	Philippe Traulle	France	56.64	59.43	58.70	59.43	
18	Matthew Maloney	United States	54.97	57.76	x	57.76	

==== Group B ====
Rank	Name	Nationality	Attempts			Result	Notes
Rank	Name	Nationality	1	2	3	Result	Notes
1	John Oosthuizen	South Africa	78.42	-	-	78.42	Q
2	James Campbell	United Kingdom	69.06	68.48	73.18	73.18	Q
3	Li Yu	China	72.80	-	-	72.80	Q
4	Mikko Kankaanpää	Finland	71.15	-	-	71.15	Q
5	Roman Avramenko	Ukraine	70.98	-	-	70.98	Q
6	Yervásios Filippídis	Greece	70.55	-	-	70.55	Q
7	Loic Lemaître	Belgium	69.60	68.28	69.78	69.78	q
8	Franz Burghagen	Germany	68.87	x	x	68.87	
9	Adam Montague	United States	63.81	66.30	61.17	66.30	
10	Sergey Gromov	Russia	63.49	63.57	66.16	66.16	
11	Chen Yu-wen	Chinese Taipei	65.31	65.42	65.62	65.62	
12	Gašper Stegnar	Slovenia	62.67	63.43	65.13	65.13	
13	Tanel Laanmäe	Estonia	62.07	58.18	60.15	62.07	
14	Kristian Kovac	Serbia	55.63	61.05	60.96	61.05	
15	Curtis Moss	Canada	55.67	56.73	57.77	57.77	
16	François Pouzet	Chile	54.55	55.86	x	55.86	

== Participation ==
According to an unofficial count, 34 athletes from 26 countries participated in the event.

- Australia (1)
- Belgium (1)
- Canada (1)
- Chile (2)
- China (2)
- Chinese Taipei (1)
- Czech Republic (1)
- Estonia (1)
- Fiji (1)
- Finland (2)
- France (1)
- Germany (2)
- Greece (2)
- Kuwait (1)
- Latvia (1)
- Oman (1)
- Paraguay (1)
- Poland (1)
- Russia (1)
- Serbia (1)
- Slovenia (2)
- South Africa (2)
- Tunisia (1)
- Ukraine (1)
- United Kingdom (1)
- United States (2)
