= Athletics at the 2011 All-Africa Games – Men's javelin throw =

The men's javelin throw event at the 2011 All-Africa Games was held on 15 September.

== Results ==
Rank	Athlete	Nationality	#1	#2	#3	#4	#5	#6	Result	Notes
1st place, gold medalist(s)	Julius Yego	Kenya	78.34	76.18	76.45	70.17	78.13	70.55	78.34	NR
2nd place, silver medalist(s)	Bernard Crous	South Africa	72.68	69.80	69.43	70.32	68.98	72.15	72.68	
3rd place, bronze medalist(s)	Friday Osanyade	Nigeria	66.20	x	x	71.01	67.86	64.30	71.01	
4	Gerhardus Pienaar	South Africa	69.62	x	70.16	68.19	66.95	69.42	70.16	
5	Ehab Abdelrahman	Egypt	69.94	67.29	x	x	65.91	65.71	69.94	
6	Kenichewkwe Godfrey	Nigeria	62.05	62.06	63.11	61.76	x	60.89	63.11	
7	Moctar Djigui	Mali	45.05	52.40	56.23	58.02	x	53.15	58.02	
8	Domingos Armando Doliz	Mozambique	x	x	52.96	51.20	47.97	x	52.96	
9	Fernandes Marcio	Cape Verde	x	x	46.47	x	45.29	41.89	46.47	
