= Gerhardus Pienaar =

South African javelin thrower

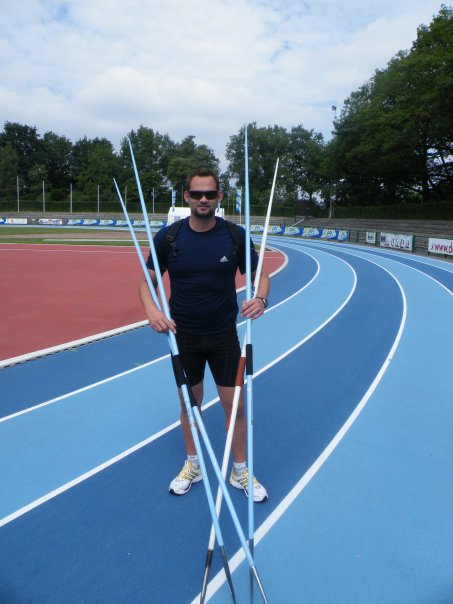
- Hardus Pienaar (2010)

Medal record

Men's athletics

Representing South Africa

African Championships
Gold medal – first place	2002 Radès	Javelin throw
Gold medal – first place	2004 Brazzaville	Javelin throw
Gold medal – first place	2006 Bambous	Javelin throw
Silver medal – second place	2010 Nairobi	Javelin throw

Gerhardus "Hardus" Pienaar (born 10 August 1981) is a South African javelin thrower. His personal best throw is 84.50 metres, achieved in October 2003 in Hyderabad. He was the 2000 Junior World Champion. He is considered to be one of the greatest javelin throwers in South African history.

== Early life ==
Although Pienaar was born in Rustenburg, South Africa. He grew up in Middelburg Mpumalanga where he attended Kanonkop Primary and Kanonkop High School. Pienaar excelled as an athlete from an early age and was notably stronger and faster than his teammates. During Primary School, his strongest athletic events were the 100 meter sprint and shot put. He represented his province at a national level and there are still many of his records to this date at the town's local track and field events.

Pienaar took on the javelin throw at age 15 and only seriously at age 16. He quickly became the number one athlete in his school and eventually the South African province of Mpumalanga. He won every major high school track and field event and in 1998 became the Junior South African Champion at age 16, only one year after he picked up a javelin for the first time. Later that year, Pienaar was selected to represent South Africa at the IAAF World Junior Championship in Annecy, France. He won the silver medal with a distance of 71.16 meters. In October of the same year, he became the Junior World Champion at the ISF junior World Championships held in Shanghai with a winning distance of 79.46. Shortly after his return from Shanghai, Pienaar threw an unofficial distance of 81.94 at a local high school track and field event. The distance was further than the official junior world record, but due to the event staff and measuring equipment not having been officially calibrated, Pienaar's junior world record could not be regarded as official by the IAAF.

Pienaar graduated from Kanonkop High School in Middelburg, South Africa and was invited to attend the prestigious training group at Potchefstroom University under the watchful eye of coach Tersis Liebenburg in 2000. During his tenure at Potchefstroom, he won the gold medal at the IAAF Coca-Cola World Junior Championships held in Santiago, Chile with a distance of 78.11.

He completed his first year and remained a student until 2001 when he decided to pursue athletics full-time.

=== Career ===
2001 Pienaar had a best performance of 80.77 in Potchefstroom and also was a World Student Games Finalist.

2002 Pienaar became the South African champion and won the gold medal at the African Championships in Rades, Tunisia with a distance of 78.63. He also came in 5th place at the IAAF World Cup in Athletics held in Madrid, Spain. His season best was 81.40 in Boechout, Belgium.

2003 Pienaar again won the South African Championship and threw a personal best of 84.50 in Hyderabad, India. This qualified Pienaar for the Olympic games in Athens, Greece.

2004 Pienaar held on to his National Champion title and Pienaar again won the gold medal at the African Championships in Brazzaville, in the Republic of the Congo, with a distance of 78.31. Pienaar made the final round of the 28th Olympic games in Athens and ended in 7th place with a distance of 79.95. His personal best for the season was 82.34. which he threw at Warsaw, Poland.

2005 Pienaar lost his South African title to Lohan Rautenbach and had a season best of 77.07.

2006 Pienaar regained the South African title again won the gold medal at the African Championships in Bambous, Mauritius with a distance of 77.55. Pienaar qualified for the Commonwealth Games in Melbourne, Australia and finished in 4th place. Pienaar also attended the IAAF World Cup in Athens and won the silver medal with a distance of 83.62.

2007 Pienaar won the silver medal at the South African National Championship with a season best of 82.96. in Oudshoorn, South Africa. He also came in 7th place at the IAAF World Championships in Osaka, Japan with a distance of 79.30.

2008 Pienaar again won the silver medal at the South African National Championship with a distance of 80.49. His personal best for the season was 80.49 which he threw at Goteborg, Sweden and just fell short of the Olympic qualifying distance of 81.80.

2009 Pienaar through a season best of 78.14 in Doha, Qatar.

2010 Pienaar again won the South African Championship and won silver at the IAAF Continental Cup with a season best of 83.19 in Split, Croatia.

2010 Pienaar opened the season with a distance of 77.65 in Bellville South Africa.

== International competitions ==
Year	Competition	Venue	Position	Notes
Representing South Africa
1998	World Junior Championships	Annecy, France	2nd	71.16 m
2000	World Junior Championships	Santiago, Chile	1st	78.11 m
2001	Universiade	Beijing, China	5th	76.79 m
2002	African Championships	Radès, Tunisia	1st	78.63 m
2003	Universiade	Daegu, South Korea	5th	74.41 m
2003	All-Africa Games	Abuja, Nigeria	2nd	76.95 m
2003	Afro-Asian Games	Hyderabad, India	1st	84.50 m
2004	African Championships	Brazzaville, Republic of the Congo	1st	78.31 m
2004	Olympic Games	Athens, Greece	14th (q)	79.95 m
2006	Commonwealth Games	Melbourne, Australia	4th	78.91 m
2006	African Championships	Bambous, Mauritius	1st	77.55 m
2007	All-Africa Games	Algiers, Algeria	2nd	76.70 m
2007	World Championships	Osaka, Japan	15th (q)	79.30 m
2010	African Championships	Nairobi, Kenya	2nd	75.96 m
2010	Continental Cup	Split, Croatia	2nd	83.17 m
2011	All-Africa Games	Maputo, Mozambique	4th	70.16 m

== Seasonal bests by year ==
- 1998 – 71.16
- 1999 – 75.71
- 2000 – 78.11
- 2001 – 80.77
- 2002 – 81.40
- 2003 – 84.50
- 2004 – 82.34
- 2005 – 77.07
- 2006 – 84.28
- 2007 – 82.96
- 2008 – 80.49
- 2009 – 78.14
- 2010 – 83.17
- 2011 – 77.65
- 2012 – 72.04
