= Athletics at the 2011 Summer Universiade – Men's javelin throw =

The men's javelin throw event at the 2011 Summer Universiade was held on 17–19 August.

== Medalists ==
Gold	Silver	Bronze
Fatih Avan; Turkey	Roman Avramenko; Ukraine	Igor Janik; Poland

== Results ==
=== Qualification ===
Qualification: 76.00 m (Q) or at least 12 best (q) qualified for the final.

Rank	Group	Athlete	Nationality	#1	#2	#3	Result	Notes
1	B	Leslie Copeland	Fiji	80.45			80.45	Q, NR
2	A	Risto Mätas	Estonia	74.35	75.07	79.18	79.18	Q
3	B	Roman Avramenko	Ukraine	78.37			78.37	Q
4	A	Juan José Méndez	Mexico	73.03	72.26	78.23	78.23	Q, PB
5	A	Fatih Avan	Turkey	77.22			77.22	Q
6	A	Roderick Genki Dean	Japan	75.91	68.82	70.10	75.91	q
7	A	Łukasz Grzeszczuk	Poland	72.92	71.19	75.57	75.57	q
8	B	Igor Janik	Poland	74.23	74.27	75.50	75.50	q
9	B	Mihkel Kukk	Estonia	70.41	74.38	x	74.38	q
10	A	Kyle Nielsen	Canada	67.69	72.17	71.88	72.17	q
11	A	Bernard Crous	South Africa	x	63.52	71.19	71.19	q
12	A	Ansis Brūns	Latvia	64.06	63.61	71.01	71.01	q
13	A	Johan Smalberger	New Zealand	66.16	68.61	x	68.61
14	B	Ehab Abdelrahman	Egypt	x	67.16	67.96	67.96
15	B	Martin Benák	Slovakia	67.75	x	x	67.75
16	B	Matthias Treff	Germany	67.66	66.60	x	67.66
17	B	Nobuhiro Sato	Japan	67.01	67.47	65.26	67.47
18	A	Dai Baohua	China	x	66.72	64.75	66.72
19	B	Leonardo Gottardo	Italy	x	x	65.00	65.00
20	B	Malith de Silva	Sri Lanka	58.01	64.99	64.78	64.99
21	B	Antoine Wagner	Luxembourg	64.36	x	64.18	64.36
22	A	Abdullah Alghamdi	Saudi Arabia	x	60.14	x	60.14

=== Final ===
Rank	Athlete	Nationality	#1	#2	#3	#4	#5	#6	Result	Notes
1st place, gold medalist(s)	Fatih Avan	Turkey	x	78.17	78.88	83.79	80.22	81.69	83.79	
2nd place, silver medalist(s)	Roman Avramenko	Ukraine	79.72	80.40	81.42	80.88	x	x	81.42	
3rd place, bronze medalist(s)	Igor Janik	Poland	77.37	76.19	79.65	x	78.04	x	79.65	
4	Risto Mätas	Estonia	72.50	77.29	77.42	78.99	77.32	74.61	78.99	
5	Mihkel Kukk	Estonia	75.83	74.85	x	x	76.87	77.93	77.93	
6	Leslie Copeland	Fiji	76.75	x	69.81	74.62	75.39	74.35	76.75	
7	Juan José Méndez	Mexico	73.26	70.30	76.46	75.65	71.82	x	76.46	
8	Łukasz Grzeszczuk	Poland	74.67	74.66	75.38	75.65	x	75.00	75.65	
9	Ansis Brūns	Latvia	73.24	74.91	70.17				74.91	
10	Kyle Nielsen	Canada	74.81	74.54	x				74.81	
11	Bernard Crous	South Africa	72.52	73.75	x				73.75	
12	Roderick Genki Dean	Japan	x	73.44	70.19				73.44	
