= Vipin Kasana =

Indian javelin thrower

Personal information
- Nationality: Indian
- Born: 4 August 1990 (age 36) Gurgaon, Haryana, India
- Height: 6 ft 2 in (188 cm)
- Weight: 91 kg (201 lb)

Sport
- Country: India
- Sport: Track and field
- Event: Javelin throw

Achievements and titles
- Personal best: 82.51 m (2019)

Vipin Kasana is an Indian athlete who competes in the Javelin throw. He participated in the 2014 Commonwealth Games which took place in Glasgow, Scotland. At the 2018 Commonwealth Games he finished fifth. Kasana was born to a Gujjar family in Gurgaon.

Kasana has a personal best of 82.51 m, recorded in the Czech Republic in 2019.
