= 2013 World Championships in Athletics – Men's javelin throw =

Men's javelin throw at the 2013 World Championships
- Venue: Luzhniki Stadium
- Dates: 15 August (qualification); 17 August (final)
- Competitors: 33 from 25 nations
- Winning distance: 87.17 m (285 ft 11 3/4 in)

Medalists
gold medal	Vítězslav Veselý; Czech Republic
silver medal	Tero Pitkämäki; Finland
bronze medal	Dmitriy Tarabin; Russia

Official Video

The men's javelin throw at the 2013 World Championships in Athletics was held at the Luzhniki Stadium on 15–17 August.

Change seems to be hitting the event. Last year's surprise Olympic champion Keshorn Walcott, didn't make the final, nor did the returning bronze medalist Guillermo Martínez. The defending champion Matthias de Zordo did not return, nor did the Olympic silver medalist Oleksandr Pyatnytsya. Former two time Olympic gold medalist Andreas Thorkildsen was in danger of not qualifying, on his final attempt, he got into an automatic qualifier, one of only three, joining Ihab Abdelrahman El Sayed, who set the Egyptian national record at 83.62.

Four throws into the final and Tero Pitkämäki took the early lead. Five throws later Vítězslav Veselý threw the winner 87.17. Two more throws and Roman Avramenko was sitting in third place after the first round. In the second round Pitkämäki improved, followed by world leader Dmitriy Tarabin taking over third place. Veselý's remaining throws wouldn't be enough to place in the top four. Pitkämäki improved again on his third attempt, falling just 10 cm short of Veselý. That mark would be good enough for silver.

At the same time as Kenyan women were in their customary position battling the Ethiopians in the women's 5000, Julius Yego's fifth round throw of 85.40 was a Kenyan national record, but more importantly, Kenya's first field event finalist was in third place in the world championships, with only one throw to go. Throwing before the home crowd, Tarabin's final effort of 86.23 took third place back for good, dashing Yego's hope for a medal.

== Records ==
Prior to the competition, the records were as follows:

World record	Jan Železný (CZE)	98.48	Jena, Germany	25 May 1996
Championship record	Jan Železný (CZE)	92.80	Edmonton, Canada	12 August 2001
World leading	Dmitri Tarabin (RUS)	88.84	Moscow, Russia	24 July 2013
African record	Marius Corbett (RSA)	88.75	Kuala Lumpur, Malaysia	21 September 1998
Asian record	Kazuhiro Mizoguchi (JPN)	87.60	San Jose, United States	27 May 1989
North, Central American and Caribbean record	Breaux Greer (USA)	91.29	Indianapolis, United States	21 June 2007
South American record	Edgar Baumann (PAR)	84.70	San Marcos, United States	17 October 1999
European record	Jan Železný (CZE)	98.48	Jena, Germany	25 May 1996
Oceanian record	Jarrod Bannister (AUS)	89.02	Brisbane, Australia	29 February 2008

== Qualification standards ==
A result	B result
83.50	81.00

== Schedule ==
Date	Time	Round
15 August 2013	9:30	Qualification
17 August 2013	18:35	Final

All times are local times (UTC+4)

== Results ==
KEY:	Q	Qualified	q	12 best performers	NR	National record	PB	Personal best	SB	Seasonal best

=== Qualification ===
Qualification: Qualifying Performance 82.50 (Q) or at least 12 best performers (q) advanced to the final.

Rank	Group	Name	Nationality	#1	#2	#3	Result	Notes
1	A	Tero Pitkämäki	Finland	84.39			84.39	Q
2	B	Ihab Abdelrahman El Sayed	Egypt	83.62			83.62	Q, NR
3	A	Andreas Thorkildsen	Norway	x	79.45	83.05	83.05	Q
4	A	Ivan Zaytsev	Uzbekistan	81.53	x	–	81.53	q
5	A	Vítězslav Veselý	Czech Republic	x	81.51	–	81.51	q
6	B	Antti Ruuskanen	Finland	80.02	81.36	–	81.36	q
7	B	Dmitriy Tarabin	Russia	x	81.32	–	81.32	q
8	A	Julius Yego	Kenya	79.56	x	80.88	80.88	q
9	A	Kim Amb	Sweden	80.84	x	80.37	80.84	q
10	A	Stuart Farquhar	New Zealand	80.73	x	76.73	80.73	q
11	B	Risto Mätas	Estonia	79.25	x	80.18	80.18	q
12	B	Fatih Avan	Turkey	78.09	79.93	80.09	80.09	
13	A	Bernhard Seifert	Germany	80.02	x	x	80.02	
14	B	Vadims Vasiļevskis	Latvia	79.09	77.59	79.68	79.68	
15	A	Guillermo Martínez	Cuba	79.67	77.88	76.70	79.67	
16	B	Teemu Wirkkala	Finland	79.50	78.54	79.26	79.50	
17	B	Víctor Fatecha	Paraguay	76.13	79.03	x	79.03	PB
18	A	Keshorn Walcott	Trinidad and Tobago	78.78	x	75.84	78.78	
19	B	Riley Dolezal	United States	72.96	78.76	77.25	78.76	
20	A	Aleksey Tovarnov	Russia	74.15	73.25	78.43	78.43	
21	B	Yukifumi Murakami	Japan	77.75	x	76.74	77.75	
22	B	Zhao Qinggang	China	76.23	76.78	77.61	77.61	
23	B	Lars Hamann	Germany	77.10	74.75	72.00	77.10	
24	A	Marcin Krukowski	Poland	x	x	76.93	76.93	
25	A	Valeriy Iordan	Russia	76.92	72.79	73.70	76.92	
26	A	Hamish Peacock	Australia	70.61	76.33	75.31	76.33	
27	B	Łukasz Grzeszczuk	Poland	74.72	x	x	74.72	
28	B	Gabriel Wallin	Sweden	74.66	x	x	74.66	
29	A	Thomas Röhler	Germany	71.88	74.45	73.67	74.45	
30	B	John Robert Oosthuizen	South Africa	74.36	70.99	x	74.36	
31	A	Uladzimir Kazlou	Belarus	72.66	67.79	x	72.66	
32	B	Leslie Copeland	Fiji	70.56	72.30	68.46	72.30	
	B	~~Roman Avramenko~~	~~Ukraine~~	~~76.73~~	~~79.91~~	~~80.37~~	~~80.37~~	DQ

=== Final ===
The final was started at 18.35.

Rank	Name	Nationality	#1	#2	#3	#4	#5	#6	Result	Notes
1st place, gold medalist(s)	Vítězslav Veselý	Czech Republic	87.17	78.80	81.21	83.80	x	–	87.17	
2nd place, silver medalist(s)	Tero Pitkämäki	Finland	83.40	86.88	87.07	85.67	x	85.22	87.07	
3rd place, bronze medalist(s)	Dmitriy Tarabin	Russia	x	84.38	x	82.25	x	86.23	86.23	
4	Julius Yego	Kenya	80.60	x	81.13	x	85.40	81.20	85.40	NR
5	Antti Ruuskanen	Finland	77.96	80.32	x	x	75.86	81.44	81.44	
6	Andreas Thorkildsen	Norway	80.93	76.82	x	80.62	81.06	–	81.06	
7	Ihab Abdelrahman El Sayed	Egypt	79.02	78.57	80.94	78.70	76.85	x	80.94	
8	Risto Mätas	Estonia	78.32	78.87	80.03				80.03	
9	Stuart Farquhar	New Zealand	79.24	75.72	x				79.24	
10	Kim Amb	Sweden	77.64	76.28	78.91				78.91	
11	Ivan Zaytsev	Uzbekistan	74.58	78.33	77.72				78.33	
	~~Roman Avramenko~~	~~Ukraine~~	~~81.32~~	~~x~~	~~80.12~~	~~82.05~~	~~78.61~~	~~80.80~~	~~82.05~~	DQ
