= Mihkel Kukk =

Estonian javelin thrower

Mihkel Kukk (born 8 October 1983, in Jõgeva) is a male javelin thrower from Estonia. His personal best throw is 81.77 metres, achieved in July 2008 in Stockholm.

== Achievements ==
| Year | Competition | Venue | Position | Result |
Representing Estonia
| 2008 | European Winter Throwing Cup | Split, Croatia | 3rd | 78.41 m |
| 2008 | National Championships | Tallinn, Estonia | 1st | 79.08 m |
| 2008 | DN Galan - IAAF Super Grand Prix | Stockholm, Sweden | 3rd | 81.77 m |
| 2008 | Olympic Games | Beijing, China | 21st (q) | 75.56 m |
| 2009 | Universiade | Belgrade, Serbia | 7th | 76.57 m |
| 2009 | World Championships | Berlin, Germany | 16th | 78.18 m |
| 2011 | Universiade | Shenzhen, China | 5th | 77.93 m |
| 2011 | World Championships | Daegu, South Korea | 23rd (q) | 76.42 m |
