= Athletics at the 2003 All-Africa Games – Men's javelin throw =

The men's javelin throw event at the 2003 All-Africa Games was held on October 15.

== Results ==
Rank	Name	Nationality	Result	Notes
1st place, gold medalist(s)	Gerhardus Pienaar	South Africa	76.95	
2nd place, silver medalist(s)	Walid Abderrazak Mohamed	Egypt	73.79	
3rd place, bronze medalist(s)	Brian Erasmus	South Africa	72.94	
4	Willie Human	South Africa	67.55	
5	Sory Diarra	Mali	58.54	
	Takondwa Phiri	Malawi	DNS	
