= Finland at the 2013 World Championships in Athletics =

- WA code: FIN
- National federation: Suomen Urheiluliitto RY
- Website: www.sul.fi

in Moscow
- Competitors: 11
- Medals: Gold 0 Silver 1 Bronze 0 Total 1

World Championships in Athletics appearances
- 1976; 1980; 1983; 1987; 1991; 1993; 1995; 1997; 1999; 2001; 2003; 2005; 2007; 2009; 2011; 2013; 2015; 2017; 2019; 2022; 2023; 2025

Finland competed at the 2013 World Championships in Athletics from August 10 to August 18 in Moscow, Russia.

== Medallists ==
The following Finnish competitors won medals at the Championships

Medal	Name	Event	Date
Silver	Tero Pitkämäki	Javelin throw	17 August

== Team selection ==
Finland sends a team consisting of 11 athletes to Moscow. Additional two athletes are reserve. Eero Haapala withdrew due to a repeating injury on August 8.

Track and road events

Event	Athletes	
Event	Men	Women
100m		Hanna-Maari Latvala
200m		Hanna-Maari Latvala
100m hurdles		Nooralotta Neziri
3000m steeplechase		Sandra Eriksson; Oona Kettunen (reserve)
20 km race walk		Anne Halkivaha
50 km race walk	Jarkko Kinnunen; Veli-Matti Partanen	

Field and combined events

Event	Athletes	
Event	Men	Women
Pole vault	Jere Bergius	
Long jump	~~Eero Haapala~~	
Javelin throw	Tero Pitkämäki; Antti Ruuskanen; Teemu Wirkkala; Ari Mannio (reserve)	

== Results ==
=== Men ===
Athlete	Event	Preliminaries		Heats		Semifinals		Final	
Athlete	Event	Time Width Height	Rank	Time Width Height	Rank	Time Width Height	Rank	Time Width Height	Rank
Jarkko Kinnunen	50 kilometres walk							3:50:56	20
Veli-Matti Partanen	50 kilometres walk							4:04:59	41
Jere Bergius	Pole vault	5.40	14					Did not advance	
~~Eero Haapala~~	Long jump	DNS						Did not advance	
Antti Ruuskanen	Javelin throw	81.36	6					81.44	6
Tero Pitkämäki	Javelin throw	84.39	1					87.07	2nd place, silver medalist(s)
Teemu Wirkkala	Javelin throw	79.50	18					Did not advance	

=== Women ===
Athlete	Event	Preliminaries		Heats		Semifinals		Final	
Athlete	Event	Time Width Height	Rank	Time Width Height	Rank	Time Width Height	Rank	Time Width Height	Rank
Hanna-Maari Latvala	100 metres			11.45	26	Did not advance			
Hanna-Maari Latvala	200 metres			23.07	20	23.21	19	Did not advance	
Nooralotta Neziri	100 metres hurdles			13.23	23	13.04 NR	16	Did not advance	
Sandra Eriksson	3000 metres steeplechase			9:45.57	18			Did not advance	
Anne Halkivaha	20 kilometres walk							1:36:17	47
