= Roman Avramenko =

Ukrainian javelin thrower (born 1988)

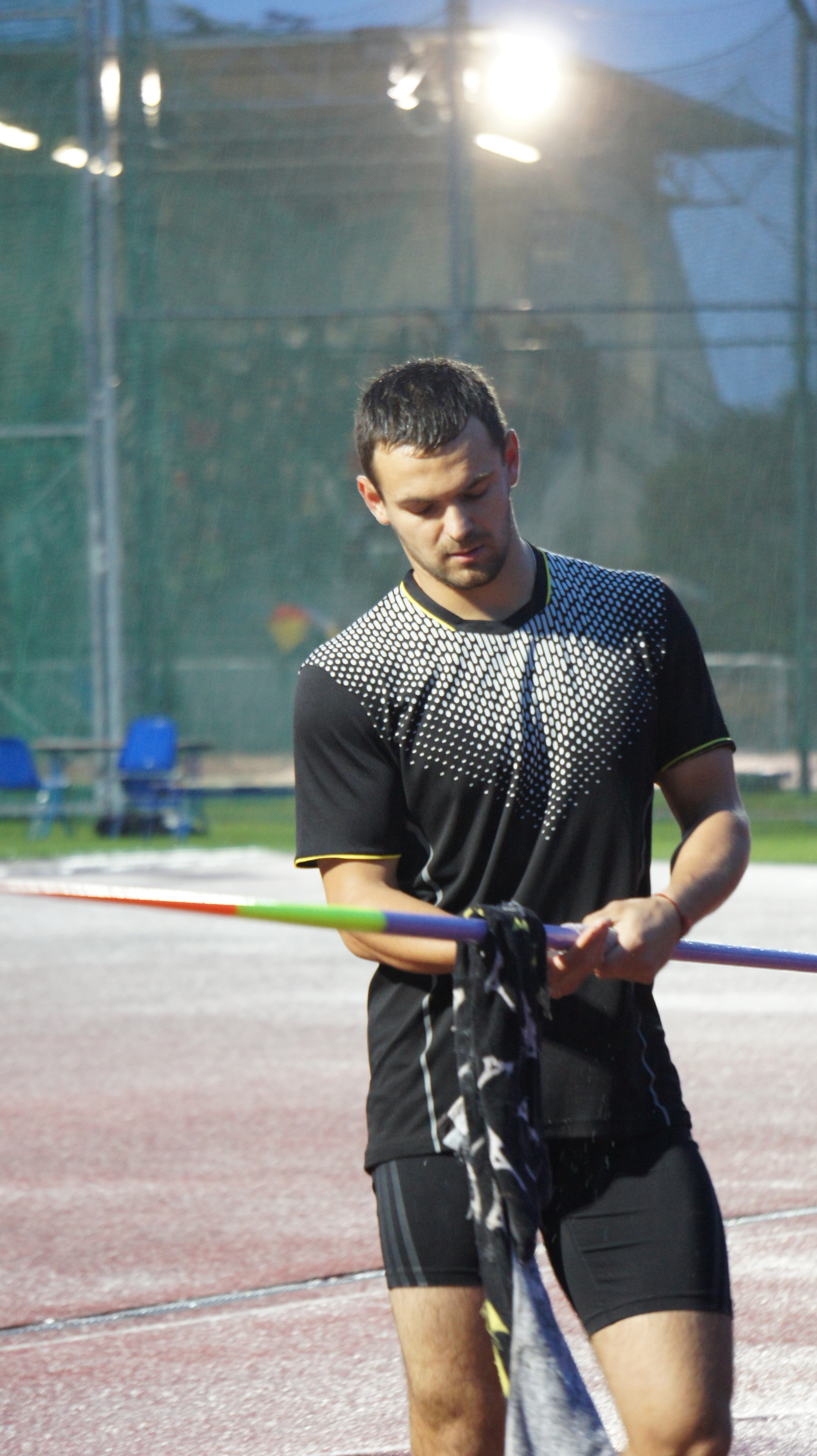
- Avramenko in 2013

Personal information
- Born: 23 March 1988 (age 38) Kirovske, Ukrainian SSR, Soviet Union
- Height: 1.85 m (6 ft 1 in)
- Weight: 95 kg (209 lb)

Sport
- Country: Ukraine
- Sport: Athletics
- Event: Javelin
Medal record
Men's athletics
Representing Ukraine
Universiade
Silver medal – second place	2011 Shenzhen	Javelin throw
World Junior Championships
Bronze medal – third place	2006 Beijing	Javelin throw
European Junior Championships
Silver medal – second place	2007 Hengelo	Javelin throw
World Youth Championships
Silver medal – second place	2005 Marrakesh	Javelin throw 700g

Roman Valeriyovych Avramenko (Ukrainian: Роман Валерійович Авраменко; born 23 March 1988) is a former Ukrainian javelin thrower.

Avramenko won a silver medal at the 2011 Summer Universiade in Shenzhen, Guangdong, China and represented Ukraine twice at the Summer Olympics.

He was twice banned from competing for a total of 10 years as a result of doping violations in 2013 and 2015.

== Personal life ==
Avramenko was born in Kirovske, Crimea, Ukrainian Soviet Socialist Republic, Soviet Union on 23 March 1988.

== Career ==
Avramenko made his Olympic debut at the 2008 Summer Olympics in Beijing, China. His best attempt in the qualifying round of the men's javelin (71.64 m) was not enough to progress to the final and he finished 29th overall.

He contested the 2011 Summer Universiade in Shenzhen, Guangdong, China. He finished second in the men's javelin throw and took home a silver medal.

In 2012, Avramenko made his final Olympic appearance after qualifying for the 2012 Summer Olympics in London, England, United Kingdom. He did not progress to the final and finished in 14th place with a throw of 80.06 metres.

Avramenko served a two-year doping ban for the use of a prohibited substance, Dehydrochloromethyltestosterone, having tested positive at the 2013 World Championships, where he had finished in fifth position. The ban lasted from 17 August 2013 to 27 August 2015.

A native of Crimea, he transferred his eligibility to Russia but received an 8-year doping ban shortly afterwards due to a failed out of competition test. The effective start date of the ban was 30 July 2015 (before the previous ban had expired).

== International competitions ==
Year	Competition	Venue	Position	Event	Notes
Representing Ukraine
2004	World Junior Championships	Grosseto, Italy	15th (q)	Javelin	66.34 m
2005	World Youth Championships	Marrakesh, Morocco	2nd	Javelin throw (0.7 kg)	79.22 m
2006	World Junior Championships	Beijing, China	3rd	Javelin throw	76.01 m
2007	European Junior Championships	Hengelo, Netherlands	2nd	Javelin throw	75.24 m
2008	Olympic Games	Beijing, China	29th (q)	Javelin throw	71.64 m
2009	Universiade	Belgrade, Serbia	13th (q)	Javelin throw	71.14 m
2009	European U23 Championships	Kaunas, Lithuania	4th	Javelin throw	78.46 m
2009	World Championships	Berlin, Germany	22nd (q)	Javelin throw	77.44 m
2010	European Championships	Barcelona, Spain	8th	Javelin throw	79.52 m
2011	Universiade	Shenzhen, China	2nd	Javelin throw	81.42 m
2011	World Championships	Daegu, South Korea	6th	Javelin throw	82.51 m
2012	Olympic Games	London, United Kingdom	14th (q)	Javelin throw	80.06 m
2013	World Championships	Moscow, Russia	5th (DSQ)	Javelin throw	82.05 m

== Seasonal bests by year ==
- 2004 – 72.68
- 2005 – 70.27
- 2006 – 76.01
- 2007 – 77.88
- 2008 – 80.08
- 2009 – 79.50
- 2010 – 81.12
- 2011 – 84.30
- 2012 – 81.87
- 2013 – 84.48
