= Egypt at the 2013 World Championships in Athletics =

- WA code: EGY

in Moscow
- Competitors: 4
- Medals: Gold 0 Silver 0 Bronze 0 Total 0

World Championships in Athletics appearances
- 1983; 1987; 1991; 1993; 1995; 1997; 1999; 2001; 2003; 2005; 2007; 2009; 2011; 2013; 2015; 2017; 2019; 2022; 2023; 2025

Egypt competed at the 2013 World Championships in Athletics in Moscow, Russia, from 10 to 18 August 2013. A team of four athletes was announced to represent the country in the event.

== Results ==
(q – qualified, NM – no mark, SB – season best)

Men

Track and road events

Athlete	Event	Preliminaries		Heats		Semifinals		Final	
Athlete	Event	Time	Rank	Time	Rank	Time	Rank	Time	Rank
Hamada Mohamed	800 metres			1:47.96	32	did not advance			

Field events

Athlete	Event	Qualification		Final	
Athlete	Event	Mark	Rank	Mark	Rank
Ihab Abdelrahman El Sayed	Javelin throw	83.62 NR	2 Q	80.94	7
Hassan Mohamed Mahmoud	Hammer throw	71.88	22	did not advance	
