= 2004 African Championships in Athletics – Men's javelin throw =

The men's javelin throw event at the 2004 African Championships in Athletics was held in Brazzaville, Republic of the Congo on July 18.

== Results ==
Rank	Name	Nationality	Result	Notes
1st place, gold medalist(s)	Gerhardus Pienaar	South Africa	78.31	
2nd place, silver medalist(s)	Gerbrandt Grobler	South Africa	76.93	
3rd place, bronze medalist(s)	Willie Human	South Africa	71.48	
4	Walid Abdel Wahab	Egypt	71.43	
5	Tarimoi Ole Siololo	Kenya	67.65	
6	Fabio Ramsamy	Mauritius	63.64	
7	Felix Iloki	Republic of the Congo	60.65	
8	Jean-Michel Mantsounga	Republic of the Congo	58.61	
9	Pedro Miguel Guimarari	Angola	53.63	
10	Samile Zouzoua	Ivory Coast	50.71	
