= Athletics at the 2015 African Games – Men's javelin throw =

The men's javelin throw event at the 2015 African Games was held on 17 September.

== Results ==
Rank	Name	Nationality	#1	#2	#3	#4	#5	#6	Result	Notes
1st place, gold medalist(s)	Ihab El-Sayed	Egypt	81.15	x	79.58	80.36	85.37	79.46	85.37	GR
2nd place, silver medalist(s)	John Ampomah	Ghana	82.94	75.78	x	74.07	x	x	82.94	
3rd place, bronze medalist(s)	Phil-Mar van Rensburg	South Africa	75.27	76.85	73.22	73.38	74.01	75.89	76.85	
4	Alexander Kiprotich	Kenya	70.86	76.34	71.20	71.53	x	x	76.34	
5	Stephanus Beukes	Botswana	72.05	76.16	66.43	74.22	70.31	68.14	76.16	
6	Tobie Holtzhausen	South Africa	72.65	62.37	x	73.35	x	66.94	73.35	
7	Strydom van der Wath	Namibia	69.78	70.53	70.24	67.16	73.20	71.11	73.20	
8	Othow Okello	Ethiopia	62.62	65.77	59.38	60.72	60.76	58.54	65.77	
9	Jean Michel Matsounga	Republic of the Congo	62.19	54.73	60.57				62.19	SB
