= 2014 African Championships in Athletics – Men's javelin throw =

The men's javelin throw event at the 2014 African Championships in Athletics was held on August 14 on Stade de Marrakech.

== Results ==
Rank	Athlete	Nationality	#1	#2	#3	#4	#5	#6	Result	Notes
1st place, gold medalist(s)	Julius Yego	Kenya	80.57	82.77	x	84.12	84.72	x	84.72	
2nd place, silver medalist(s)	Ihab Abdelrahman El Sayed	Egypt	81.09	82.35	80.84	x	81.09	83.59	83.59	
3rd place, bronze medalist(s)	Robert Oosthuizen	South Africa	x	68.25	77.81	72.57	77.50	75.78	77.81	
4	Adriaan Stephanus Beukes	Botswana	66.82	66.02	67.81	72.99	76.52	65.40	76.52	NR
5	John Ampomah	Ghana	x	x	75.50	73.26	75.99	75.85	75.99	NR
6	Rocco van Rooyen	South Africa	75.41	72.62	73.07	x	x	x	75.41	
7	Alex Kiprotich	Kenya	64.39	69.25	72.43	x	x	–	72.43	
8	Bilal Nouali	Morocco	x	61.71	66.45	66.24	65.09	x	66.45	
9	Othow Okello	Ethiopia	65.87	64.50	62.14				65.87	
10	Mitko Tilahun	Ethiopia	57.47	60.36	56.21				60.36	
11	Jean Michel Matsounga	Republic of the Congo	59.62	54.69	57.46				59.62	
12	Sanja Santse	Ethiopia	x	58.01	46.82				58.01	
13	Juma Ali Seifi	Tanzania	46.51	47.61	49.01				49.01	
