= Phil-Mar van Rensburg =

South African javelin thrower

Personal information
- Nationality: South Africa
- Born: 23 June 1989 (age 37) Tzaneen
- Agent: Newton Agency

Sport
- Country: South Africa
- Sport: Athletics
- Event: Javelin Throw
Medal record
Men's athletics
Representing South Africa
African Games
Bronze medal – third place	2015 Brazzaville	Javelin throw
African Championships
Gold medal – first place	2016 Durban	Javelin throw
Silver medal – second place	2018 Asaba	Javelin throw
- Updated on 26 August 2016

Phil-Mar van Rensburg (born 23 June 1989) is a South African track and field athlete who specialises in the javelin throw. He holds a personal best of 80.49 m (264 ft 3/4 in). He was a bronze medallist at the 2015 African Games then became African champion at the 2016 African Championships in Athletics.

== International competitions ==
Year	Competition	Venue	Position	Event	Notes
2015	African Games	Brazzaville, Republic of Congo	3rd	Javelin throw	76.85 m
2016	African Championships	Durban, South Africa	1st	Javelin throw	76.04 m
2018	Commonwealth Games	Gold Coast, Australia	4th	Javelin throw	79.83 m
2018	African Championships	Asaba, Nigeria	2nd	Javelin throw	76.57 m
