= 2010 African Championships in Athletics – Men's javelin throw =

The men's javelin throw at the 2010 African Championships in Athletics was held on August 1.

== Results ==
Rank	Athlete	Nationality	#1	#2	#3	#4	#5	#6	Result	Notes
1st place, gold medalist(s)	Ihab Al Sayed Abdelrahman	Egypt	74.94	74.78	77.19	77.09	78.02	X	78.02	SB
2nd place, silver medalist(s)	Gerhardus Pienaar	South Africa	74.97	73.77	X	73.77	75.20	75.96	75.96	
3rd place, bronze medalist(s)	Julius Yego	Kenya	71.70	70.54	74.51	72.29	71.67	72.95	74.51	SB
4	Ulrich Damon	South Africa	64.90	66.00	71.18	68.44	65.69	71.50	71.50	
5	Tobie Holtzhausen	South Africa	63.54	66.77	61.42	61.41	65.40	65.08	66.77	
6	Mitko Tilahun	Ethiopia	65.02	61.58	64.71	60.65	X	56.23	65.02	
7	Patrick Kibwota	Uganda	63.88	62.54	64.22	X	62.21	60.22	64.22	
8	Michael Rono	Kenya	X	55.97	64.11	63.39	63.22	62.02	64.11	SB
9	Moctar Djigui	Mali	63.14	61.88	60.72				63.14	
10	Sammy Keskeny	Kenya	63.10	X	61.38				63.10	
11	Jean Luck Mukoko	Democratic Republic of the Congo	49.24	46.16	X				49.24	
	Mohamed Ali Kebabou	Tunisia							DNS	
	Manuella Kombo	Central African Republic							DNS	
	Msama Mpundu	Zambia							DNS	
