= 2016 African Championships in Athletics – Men's javelin throw =

The men's javelin throw event at the 2016 African Championships in Athletics was held on 26 June in Kings Park Stadium.

== Results ==
Rank	Athlete	Nationality	Result	Notes
1st place, gold medalist(s)	Phil-Mar van Rensburg	South Africa	76.04	
2nd place, silver medalist(s)	John Ampomah	Ghana	75.22	
3rd place, bronze medalist(s)	Alex Kiprotich	Kenya	74.08	
4	Tobie Holtzhausen	South Africa	73.45	
5	Maged Amer	Egypt	71.62	
6	Chad Herman	South Africa	71.21	
7	Ahmed Elbramlsy	Egypt	69.66	
8	Strydom van der Wath	Namibia	68.40	
9	Nelson Yego	Kenya	66.43	
10	Samuel Kure	Nigeria	65.25	
11	Pako Tsapo	Botswana	61.75	
12	Gary King	Zimbabwe	56.79	
	Atsu Nyamadi	Ghana	DNS	
	Othow Ojulu	Ethiopia	DNS	
