= John Ampomah =

Ghanaian javelin thrower (born 1990)

Personal information
- Nationality: (Ghana) Ghanaian
- Born: 11 July 1990 (age 36) Konongo, Ghana
- Education: Middle Tennessee State University
- Height: 1.91 m (6 ft 3 in)
- Weight: 100 kg (220 lb)

Sport
- Sport: Track and field
- Event: Javelin throw
- College team: Middle Tennessee Blue Raiders
Medal record
Men's athletics
Representing Ghana
African Games
| Silver medal – second place | 2015 Brazzaville | Javelin throw |
African Championships
| Silver medal – second place | 2012 Porto-Novo | Javelin throw |
| Silver medal – second place | 2016 Durban | Javelin throw |

John Ampomah (born 11 July 1990) is a Ghanaian athlete specialising in the javelin throw. He is currently attending Middle Tennessee State University and is part of the university's track and field team.

Ampomah represented Ghana at the 2016 Summer Olympics in Rio de Janeiro, Brazil. He was the captain of the Ghanaian team in Rio de Janeiro.

== Career ==
Ampomah came onto the scene in 2012, when he broke the 19-year old national record with a throw of 69.00m in March 2012 in Tamale, before improving the record two more times at the African Championship, where he won silver, and at the 2012 rlg Grand Prix where he threw 73.69m. While tutoring at Wiley College, Ampomah set another national javelin record subsequent to gaining a throw of 74.42m on his approach to winning the spear title at the 2014 US NAIA National Championships. This eclipsed the previous mark of 74.35m that he had set at the Jim Mize Invitational on 22 March 2014. On 4 April 2015 he broke the national record again, throwing 76.50m to win his third open air rivalry in Auburn-Alabama. Ampomah's new individual best supplanted the past characteristic of 75.99m, which he set at the CAA African Championships in August, 2015 where he set fifth by and large. Later in the month, John threw 81.55m to improve his national record by 5 meters and 5 centimeters. In Sergey Bubka design, this was then the eighth national record since his disclosure in 2012.

He won silver medals at the 2015 African Games and 2012 African Championships. He also won silver medal at the African Championships in Durban in 2016. His personal best in the event is 83.09 metres set in Soga-Nana Memorial, Cape Coast, Ghana. This is the current national record. Ampomah has broken the national javelin record an unprecedented ten times since 2012 when he came onto the national scene.

== Competition record ==
| Year | Competition | Venue | Position | Event | Notes |
Representing Ghana
| 2012 | African Championships | Porto-Novo, Benin | 2nd | Javelin throw | 70.65 m |
| 2014 | Commonwealth Games | Glasgow, United Kingdom | 9th | Javelin throw | 69.56 m |
| 2014 | African Championships | Marrakesh, Morocco | 5th | Javelin throw | 75.99 m |
| 2015 | African Games | Brazzaville, Republic of the Congo | 2nd | Javelin throw | 82.94 m |
| 2016 | African Championships | Durban, South Africa | 2nd | Javelin throw | 75.22 m |
| 2016 | Olympic Games | Rio de Janeiro, Brazil | 19th (q) | Javelin throw | 80.39 m |
| 2024 | African Games | Accra, Ghana | 9th | Javelin throw | 66.64 m |

== Seasonal bests by year ==
- 2012 – 70.65
- 2014 – 75.99
- 2015 – 82.94
- 2016 – 83.09 NR

== Awards ==
- SWAG Male Athlete:2012, 2015
- Ghana-Ethiopian Airlines Athletes 2015
