= Athletics at the 2018 Commonwealth Games – Men's javelin throw =

Men's javelin throw at the 2018 Commonwealth Games
- Venue: Carrara Stadium
- Dates: 13 April (qualifying round); 14 April (final)
- Competitors: 24 from 19 nations
- Winning distance: 86.47 m

Medalists
| gold medal | Neeraj Chopra | India |
| silver medal | Hamish Peacock | Australia |
| bronze medal | Anderson Peters | Grenada |

The men's javelin throw at the 2018 Commonwealth Games, as part of the athletics programme, took place in the Carrara Stadium on 13 and 14 April 2018.

== Records ==
Prior to this competition, the existing world and Games records were as follows:

| World record | Jan Železný (CZE) | 98.48 m | Jena, Germany | 25 May 1996 |
| Games record | Marius Corbett (RSA) | 88.75 m | Kuala Lumpur, Malaysia | 21 September 1998 |

== Schedule ==
The schedule was as follows:

| Date | Time | Round |
|---|---|---|
| Friday 13 April 2018 | 10:00 | Qualification |
| Saturday 14 April 2018 | 14:35 | Final |

All times are Australian Eastern Standard Time (UTC+10)

== Results ==
=== Qualifying round ===
Across two groups, those who threw ≥78.00 m (Q) or at least the 12 best performers (q) advanced to the final.

| Rank | Athlete | Group | #1 | #2 | #3 | Result | Notes | Qual. |
|---|---|---|---|---|---|---|---|---|
| 1 | B | Hamish Peacock (AUS) | 74.58 | 76.49 | 81.22 | 81.22 | | Q |
| 2 | B | Arshad Nadeem (PAK) | x | 80.45 | | 80.45 | NR | Q |
| 3 | A | Anderson Peters (GRN) | 76.93 | 76.08 | 80.44 | 80.44 | | Q |
| 4 | A | Neeraj Chopra (IND) | 80.42 | | | 80.42 | | Q |
| 5 | B | Vipin Kasana (IND) | 78.88 | | | 78.88 | | Q |
| 6 | A | Albert Reynolds (LCA) | 76.02 | 71.86 | 78.10 | 78.10 | | Q |
| 7 | B | Phil-Mar van Rensburg (RSA) | 78.00 | | | 78.00 | | Q |
| 8 | A | Luke Cann (AUS) | 72.23 | 77.43 | 70.43 | 77.43 | | q |
| 9 | B | Ben Langton Burnell (NZL) | 75.29 | 74.29 | 70.87 | 75.29 | | q |
| 10 | A | Shakeil Waithe (TTO) | 71.39 | x | 75.21 | 75.21 | | q |
| 11 | A | Alex Kiprotich (KEN) | 70.03 | 74.88 | 73.69 | 74.88 | | q |
| 12 | A | Sampath Ranasinghe (SRI) | 74.72 | 71.75 | 73.93 | 74.72 | | q |
| 13 | B | Julius Yego (KEN) | x | 74.55 | 73.67 | 74.55 | | |
| 14 | B | Leslain Baird (GUY) | 74.27 | 68.50 | 72.15 | 74.27 | | |
| 15 | A | Samuel Kure (NGR) | 72.70 | 73.49 | 72.07 | 73.49 | PB | |
| 16 | A | Joe Harris (IOM) | 70.61 | 69.91 | 64.38 | 70.61 | | |
| 17 | A | Donny Tuimaseve (SAM) | 67.78 | 61.26 | 62.44 | 67.78 | NR | |
| 18 | B | Alexander Pascal (CAY) | 65.08 | 66.66 | 62.85 | 66.66 | | |
| 19 | B | Andre Bazil (DMA) | x | 58.84 | 65.81 | 65.81 | SB | |
| 20 | B | Gennard Paul (GRN) | 58.91 | x | 60.16 | 60.16 | | |
| 21 | B | Jack Nasawa (VAN) | x | 45.94 | 56.12 | 56.12 | | |
| 22 | A | Imo Fiamalua (TUV) | 47.45 | 47.99 | 52.84 | 52.84 | | |
| 23 | A | Nia Misikea (NIU) | 44.24 | 47.73 | x | 47.73 | | |
| 24 | B | Loe Kaufisi (NIU) | x | x | 38.44 | 38.44 | | |

=== Final ===
The medals were determined in the final.

| Rank | Name | #1 | #2 | #3 | #4 | #5 | #6 | Result | Notes |
|---|---|---|---|---|---|---|---|---|---|
| 1st place, gold medalist(s) | Neeraj Chopra (IND) | 85.50 | x | 84.78 | 86.47 | 83.48 | x | 86.47 | SB |
| 2nd place, silver medalist(s) | Hamish Peacock (AUS) | 75.95 | 81.37 | 79.05 | 82.59 | 79.74 | 79.42 | 82.59 | |
| 3rd place, bronze medalist(s) | Anderson Peters (GRN) | 68.68 | 82.20 | 74.53 | 80.57 | 74.93 | 79.52 | 82.20 | |
| 4 | Phil-Mar van Rensburg (RSA) | 77.00 | 79.83 | x | x | 75.98 | 74.10 | 79.83 | |
| 5 | Vipin Kasana (IND) | 72.16 | 75.93 | 77.87 | 77.22 | x | 77.42 | 77.87 | |
| 6 | Luke Cann (AUS) | 62.79 | 72.10 | 76.99 | 70.94 | x | x | 76.99 | |
| 7 | Shakeil Waithe (TTO) | 76.85 | x | x | x | x | x | 76.85 | |
| 8 | Arshad Nadeem (PAK) | 74.46 | 73.55 | 75.75 | 74.91 | 76.02 | 73.84 | 76.02 | |
| 9 | Albert Reynolds (LCA) | 73.87 | 71.49 | 71.44 | — | | | 73.87 | |
| 10 | Ben Langton Burnell (NZL) | 73.77 | 72.47 | 73.06 | — | | | 73.77 | |
| 11 | Alex Toroitich Kiprotich (KEN) | 68.68 | 72.72 | 73.21 | — | | | 73.21 | |
| 12 | Sampath Ranasinghe (SRI) | 69.44 | 70.15 | 68.61 | — | | | 70.15 | |
