= Athletics at the 2013 Summer Universiade – Men's javelin throw =

The men's javelin throw event at the 2013 Summer Universiade was held on 8–10 July.

== Medalists ==
Gold	Silver	Bronze
Dmitriy Tarabin; Russia	John Robert Oosthuizen; South Africa	Fatih Avan; Turkey

== Results ==
=== Qualification ===
Qualification: 70.00 m (Q) or at least 12 best (q) qualified for the final.

Rank	Group	Athlete	Nationality	#1	#2	#3	Result	Notes
1	B	Dmitriy Tarabin	Russia	77.35			77.35	Q
2	A	John Robert Oosthuizen	South Africa	76.48			76.48	Q
3	A	Valeriy Iordan	Russia	76.05			76.05	Q
4	B	Ihab Abdelrahman El Sayed	Egypt	76.05			75.50	Q
5	A	Fatih Avan	Turkey	72.73			72.73	Q
6	B	Ryohei Arai	Japan	68.80	72.71		72.71	Q
7	A	Genki Dean	Japan	69.80	72.11		72.11	Q
8	A	Antoine Wagner	Luxembourg	71.91			71.91	Q
9	B	Huang Shih-Feng	Chinese Taipei	71.73			71.73	Q
10	B	Kyle Nielsen	Canada	x	65.81	71.31	71.31	Q
11	A	Petr Frydrych	Czech Republic	71.08			71.08	Q
12	B	Łukasz Grzeszczuk	Poland	70.91			70.91	Q
13	A	Norbert Bonvecchio	Italy	70.53			70.53	Q
14	B	Sampo Lehtola	Finland	68.49	70.03		70.03	Q
15	A	Juan José Méndez	Mexico	69.70	63.71	x	69.70	
16	B	Magnus Kirt	Estonia	68.74	69.11	x	69.11	
17	B	Jayson Henning	South Africa	68.63	68.46	63.95	68.63	
18	A	Adriaan Beukes	Botswana	67.87	68.23	67.28	68.23	
19	B	Tomás Guerra	Chile	68.10	67.78	x	68.10	
20	A	Cody Parker	Canada	62.35	65.77	64.95	65.77	
21	B	Alexandru Craescu	Romania	65.76	x	x	65.76	
22	B	Olof Hansson	Sweden	63.65	62.46	65.41	65.41	
23	A	Cheng Chao-Tsun	Chinese Taipei	62.05	65.38	x	65.38	SB
24	A	Altaf Hussain Shah	Pakistan	60.78	58.35	63.01	63.01	
25	B	Kerron Browne	Trinidad and Tobago	x	x	60.15	60.15	
26	A	Malith Lama Hewage	Sri Lanka	57.21	x	49.85	57.21	
	A	Kaida Mohamed Ibrahim	Qatar				DNS	
	B	Al-Muhannadi Al-Mumannadi	Qatar				DNS	

=== Final ===
Rank	Athlete	Nationality	#1	#2	#3	#4	#5	#6	Result	Notes
1st place, gold medalist(s)	Dmitriy Tarabin	Russia	83.11	81.62	x	x	–	x	83.11	
2nd place, silver medalist(s)	John Robert Oosthuizen	South Africa	81.63	x	x	x	74.27	74.68	81.63	
3rd place, bronze medalist(s)	Fatih Avan	Turkey	75.55	73.09	74.26	81.24	x	x	81.24	
4	Sampo Lehtola	Finland	78.63	71.50	74.91	73.56	74.48	79.02	79.02	SB
5	Genki Dean	Japan	71.62	78.21	73.49	71.91	x	78.21	78.21	
6	Łukasz Grzeszczuk	Poland	x	74.11	77.98	77.23	x	x	77.98	
7	Petr Frydrych	Czech Republic	75.52	x	71.69	75.69	x	x	75.69	
8	Ryohei Arai	Japan	73.75	71.08	75.53	75.15	66.59	69.79	75.53	
9	Norbert Bonvecchio	Italy	75.28	69.16	72.37				75.28	
10	Kyle Nielsen	Canada	74.61	73.70	66.62				74.61	
11	Valeriy Iordan	Russia	66.45	73.49	71.41				73.49	
12	Ihab Abdelrahman El Sayed	Egypt	72.58	72.02	73.42				73.42	
13	Huang Shih-Feng	Chinese Taipei	66.04	72.84	x				72.84	
14	Antoine Wagner	Luxembourg	69.16	x	68.85				69.16	
