= Douw Smit =

South African javelin thrower (born 1999)

Personal information
- Nationality: South African
- Born: 12 May 1999 (age 27)

Sport
- Sport: Athletics
- Event: Javelin

Achievements and titles
- Personal best: Javelin: 84.57m (2026)
Medal record
Men's athletics
Representing South Africa
African Championships
Bronze medal – third place	2026 Accra	Javelin throw

Douw Smit (born 12 May 1999) is a South African track and field athlete. He is a three-time national champion in the javelin and won the bronze medal at the 2026 African Championships in Athletics. Smit was the runner-up at the 2025 Ostrava Golden Spike where he recorded a personal best of 84.12 metres. In May 2026, he competed in Poland again and won the javelin throw with 84.57m at the Irena Szewińska Memorial. He placed fifth in the javelin throw at the 2026 Commonwealth Games in Glasgow, Scotland.
