= Łukasz Grzeszczuk =

Polish javelin thrower (born 1990)

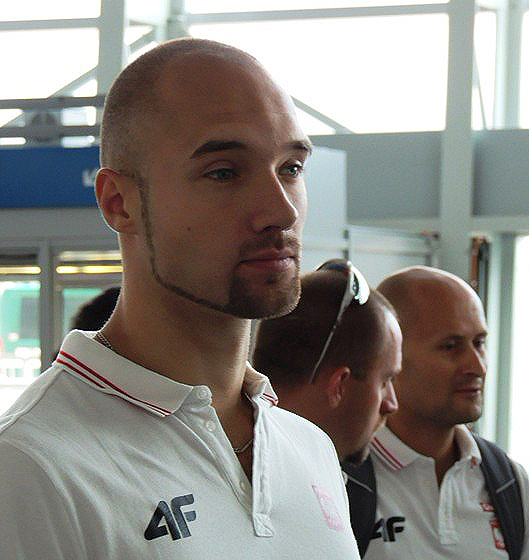
- Łukasz Grzeszczuk in 2013

Personal information
- Born: 3 March 1990 (age 36) Warsaw, Poland
- Height: 1.90 m (6 ft 3 in)
- Weight: 95 kg (209 lb)

Sport
- Sport: Athletics
- Event: Javelin throw
- Club: Warszawianka Warszawa
- Coached by: Michał Krukowski

Łukasz Grzeszczuk (born 3 March 1990 in Warsaw) is a Polish athlete specialising in the javelin throw. He represented his country at the 2013 World Championships without qualifying for the final.

His personal best in the event is 84.77 metres set in Riga in 2014.

== International competitions ==
Year	Competition	Venue	Position	Event	Notes
Representing Poland
2009	European Junior Championships	Novi Sad, Serbia	3rd	Javelin throw	73.55 m
2011	European U23 Championships	Ostrava, Czech Republic	5th	Javelin throw	79.02 m
2011	Universiade	Shenzhen, China	8th	Javelin throw	75.65 m
2013	Universiade	Kazan, Russia	6th	Javelin throw	77.98 m
2013	World Championships	Moscow, Russia	27th (q)	Javelin throw	74.72 m
2014	European Championships	Zürich, Switzerland	13th (q)	Javelin throw	77.74 m
2016	European Championships	Amsterdam, Netherlands	11th	Javelin throw	76.41 m
2016	Olympic Games	Rio de Janeiro, Brazil	31st (q)	Javelin throw	76.52 m

== Seasonal progression ==
- 2009 - 73.55
- 2010 - 76.65
- 2011 - 80.58
- 2012 - 79.40
- 2013 - 83.98
- 2014 - 84.77
- 2016 - 83.60
