= 2002 African Championships in Athletics – Men's javelin throw =

The men's javelin throw event at the 2002 African Championships in Athletics was held in Radès, Tunisia on August 10.

== Results ==
Rank	Name	Nationality	Result	Notes
1st place, gold medalist(s)	Gerhardus Pienaar	South Africa	78.63	
2nd place, silver medalist(s)	Walid Abderrazak Mohamed	Egypt	70.86	
3rd place, bronze medalist(s)	Mohamed Ali Ben Zina	Tunisia	66.69	
4	Kouadio Benoît Lingue	Ivory Coast	59.50	
	Pedro Guimares	Angola	DNS	
