= 2012 African Championships in Athletics – Men's javelin throw =

The men's javelin throw at the 2012 African Championships in Athletics was held at the Stade Charles de Gaulle on 11يمر

== Medalists ==
Gold	Julius Yego; Kenya
Silver	John Ampomah; Ghana
Bronze	Kenechukwu Ezeofor; Nigeria

== Records ==
Standing records prior to the 2012 African Championships in Athletics
World record	Jan Železný (CZE)	98.48	Jena, Germany	25 May 1996
African record	Marius Corbett (RSA)	88.75	Kuala Lumpur, Malaysia	21 September 1998
Championship record	Tom Petranoff (RSA)	87.26	Mauritius	28 June 1992

== Schedule ==
Date	Time	Round
1 July 2012	15:20	Final

== Results ==
=== Final ===
Rank	Athlete	Nationality	#1	#2	#3	#5	#5	#6	Result	Notes
1st place, gold medalist(s)	Julius Yego	Kenya	70.93	76.68	74.94	x	74.51	x	76.68	
2nd place, silver medalist(s)	John Ampomah	Ghana	x	63.52	68.07	70.65	68.53	63.30	70.65	NR
3rd place, bronze medalist(s)	Kenechukwu Ezeofor	Nigeria	62.56	60.46	63.02	69.58	63.39	68.87	69.58	
4	Jayson Henning	South Africa	63.09	65.50	63.98	67.93	67.98	x	67.98	
5	Ihab Al Sayed Abdelrahman	Egypt	62.42	64.00	65.22	64.32	65.13	67.82	67.82	
6	Bernard Crous	South Africa	55.21	62.77	55.12	50.75	62.07	51.67	62.77	
7	John Robert Oosthuizen	South Africa	53.57	x	62.13	58.52	51.22	x	62.13	
8	Mitku Tilahun	Ethiopia	59.33	59.94	61.04	62.00	x	61.03	62.00	
9	Abdul Aziz Garba Bako	Niger	56.07	58.15	56.38				58.15	NR
10	Vivien Adifon	Benin	56.73	52.09	48.40				56.73	
11	Sapo Sanja	Ethiopia	49.02	50.49	53.60				53.60	
