= Athletics at the 2007 All-Africa Games – Men's javelin throw =

The men's javelin throw at the 2007 All-Africa Games was held on July 22.

== Results ==
Rank	Athlete	Nationality	Result	Notes
1st place, gold medalist(s)	Robert Oosthuizen	South Africa	78.05	
2nd place, silver medalist(s)	Gerhardus Pienaar	South Africa	76.70	
3rd place, bronze medalist(s)	Mohamed Ali Kbabou	Tunisia	71.77	
4	Waled Abdelwhab El Sayed	Egypt	67.81	
5	Kenechukwu Ezeofor	Nigeria	66.29	
6	Guy Nassel	Central African Republic	54.40	
7	Edges Bill Neto do Santo	São Tomé and Príncipe	40.57	
