= Adriaan Stephanus Beukes =

Motswana javelin thrower

Adriaan Stephanus Beukes (born 14 July 1994) is a Motswana javelin thrower.

He finished fourth at the 2011 African Junior Championships, fourth at the 2014 African Championships and fifth at the 2015 African Games. He also competed at the 2012 World Junior Championships and the 2013 Summer Universiade without reaching the final.

His personal best throw is 80.49 metres, achieved in May 2015 in Gaborone. This is the Botswanan record.
