= Athletics at the 2009 Summer Universiade – Men's javelin throw =

The men's javelin throw event at the 2009 Summer Universiade was held on 8–10 July.

== Medalists ==
Gold	Silver	Bronze
Ainārs Kovals; Latvia	Stuart Farquhar; New Zealand	Park Jae-Myong; South Korea

== Results ==
=== Qualification ===
Qualification: 76.00 m (Q) or at least 12 best (q) qualified for the final.

Rank	Group	Athlete	Nationality	#1	#2	#3	Result	Notes
1	A	Stuart Farquhar	New Zealand	79.49			79.49	Q
2	B	Ainārs Kovals	Latvia	72.20	73.32	77.76	77.76	Q
3	A	Igor Janik	Poland	76.50			76.50	Q
4	A	Fatih Avan	Turkey	x	x	75.38	75.38	q, PB
5	A	Aliaksandr Ashomka	Belarus	74.89	71.35	72.74	74.89	q
6	B	Park Jae-Myong	South Korea	72.79	x	74.64	74.64	q
7	A	Jung Sang-Jin	South Korea	72.99	74.34	71.02	74.34	q
8	A	Ihab Al Sayed Abdelrahman	Egypt	70.13	69.46	73.78	73.78	q
9	B	Paweł Rakoczy	Poland	70.28	x	72.41	72.41	q
10	B	Wei Zheng	China	65.10	65.82	72.20	72.20	q
11	B	Mihkel Kukk	Estonia	72.19	69.31	71.26	72.19	q
12	B	Uladzimir Kazlou	Belarus	71.36	72.11	x	72.11	q
13	B	Roman Avramenko	Ukraine	70.24	x	71.14	71.14	
14	A	Johan Smalberger	New Zealand	70.85	66.45	68.10	70.85	
15	B	Joshua Robinson	Australia	70.75	x	68.66	70.75	
16	A	Krisztián Török	Hungary	67.27	67.34	70.69	70.69	
17	A	Rafael Baraza	Spain	66.12	70.11	67.65	70.11	
18	A	Konstantinos Vertoudos	Greece	69.17	69.88	x	69.88	
19	B	Víctor Fatecha	Paraguay	69.86	x	68.24	69.86	
20	B	Ulrich Damon	South Africa	65.39	64.84	69.13	69.13	
21	A	Patrick Kibwota	Uganda	65.57	65.58	68.07	68.07	
22	B	Arthur Koomson Ankomah	Ghana	x	67.47	64.75	67.47	
23	A	Alexandru Craescu	Romania	63.90	67.15	x	67.15	
24	B	Roberto Bertolini	Italy	66.84	x	x	66.84	
25	B	Miodrag Djukić	Serbia	66.63	65.62	x	66.63	
26	B	Lars Møller Laursen	Denmark	x	65.15	65.43	65.43	
27	A	Ramūnas Butkus	Lithuania	64.46	x	x	64.46	
28	A	Vedran Samac	Serbia	61.41	63.94	x	63.94	
29	A	Kudzai Tuso	Zimbabwe	x	40.73	–	40.73	
	A	Vladislav Shkurlatov	Russia	x	–	–	NM	
	B	Lyambela Mwandamena	Zambia	x	x	x	NM	
	B	Dmitrii Nazarov	Kyrgyzstan				DNS	

=== Final ===
Rank	Athlete	Nationality	#1	#2	#3	#4	#5	#6	Result	Notes
1st place, gold medalist(s)	Ainārs Kovals	Latvia	80.18	81.58	77.34	80.97	x	74.28	81.58	
2nd place, silver medalist(s)	Stuart Farquhar	New Zealand	69.09	79.48	75.62	x	75.57	x	79.48	
3rd place, bronze medalist(s)	Park Jae-Myong	South Korea	79.29	x	72.50	77.22	76.12	77.49	79.29	
4	Igor Janik	Poland	74.75	77.65	x	79.16	x	x	79.16	
5	Uladzimir Kazlou	Belarus	78.29	74.38	x	74.66	x	x	78.29	
6	Paweł Rakoczy	Poland	77.22	75.68	71.19	x	x	x	77.22	
7	Mihkel Kukk	Estonia	68.48	73.61	76.57	x	75.83	70.74	76.57	
8	Jung Sang-Jin	South Korea	71.28	74.79	76.15	x	72.31	74.50	76.15	
9	Aliaksandr Ashomka	Belarus	73.30	x	75.18				75.18	
10	Wei Zheng	China	73.12	72.39	73.51				73.51	PB
11	Fatih Avan	Turkey	x	73.31	x				73.31	
12	Ihab Al Sayed Abdelrahman	Egypt	x	x	68.43				68.43	
