= Norbert Bonvecchio =

Italian javelin thrower

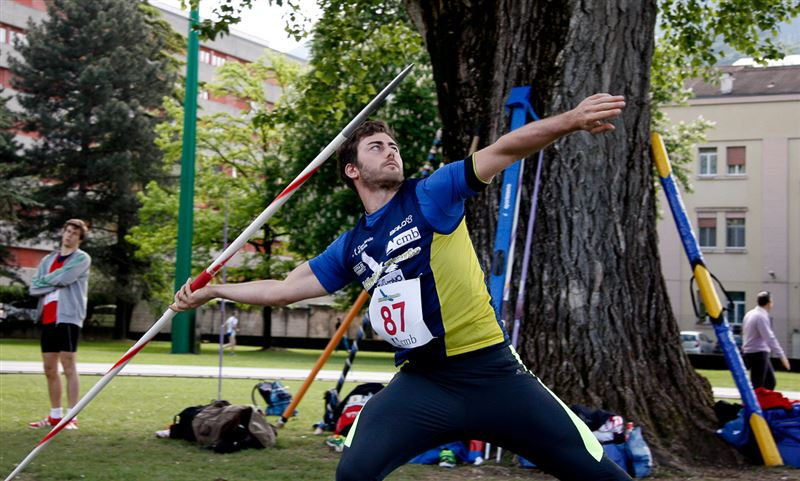

Personal information
- Born: 15 August 1985 (age 40) Trento
- Education: University of L'Aquila
- Height: 1.81 m (5 ft 11 in)
- Weight: 81 kg (179 lb)

Sport
- Sport: Athletics
- Event: Javelin throw
- Club: Atletica Trento
- Coached by: Sergio Bonvecchio

Norbert Bonvecchio (born 14 August 1985) is an Italian athlete specialising in the javelin throw. Earlier in his career, he competed in the high jump.

His personal best in the event is 80.37 metres, set in Braunschweig in 2014.

== International competitions ==
Year	Competition	Venue	Position	Event	Notes
Representing Italy
2013	Mediterranean Games	Mersin, Turkey	6th	Javelin throw	72.55 m
2013	Universiade	Kazan, Russia	9th	Javelin throw	75.28 m
2014	European Championships	Zürich, Switzerland	30th (q)	Javelin throw	69.38 m
2016	European Cup Winter Throwing	Arad, Romania	2nd	Javelin throw	76.66 m
2016	European Championships	Amsterdam, Netherlands	24th (q)	Javelin throw	75.75 m

== Seasonal bests by year ==
- 2008 - 70.23
- 2009 - 70.74
- 2011 - 75.52
- 2012 - 79.22
- 2013 - 77.78
- 2014 - 80.37
- 2015 - 79.45
- 2016 - 79.21
- 2017 – 79.80
- 2018 – 70.93
- 2019 – 73.22
- 2020 – 74.64
