= Fatih Avan =

Turkish javelin thrower

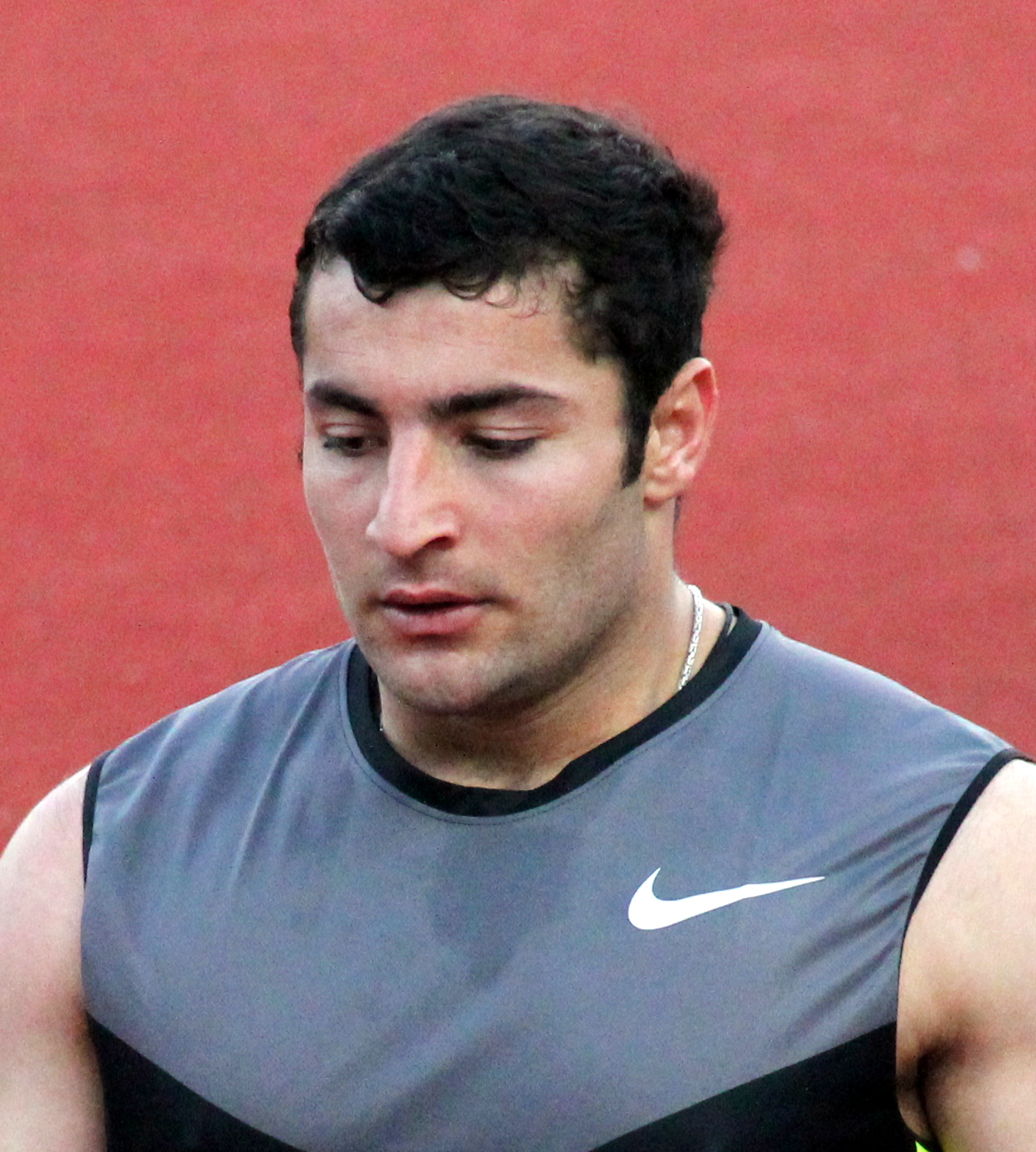

Personal information
- Nationality: Turkey
- Born: 1 January 1989 (age 37) Andırın, Kahramanmaraş Province, Turkey
- Height: 183 cm (6 ft 0 in)
- Weight: 90 kg (198 lb)

Sport
- Sport: Javelin throw
- Club: Fenerbahçe Athletics
- Coached by: Metin Altıntaş

Achievements and titles
- Personal best: 85.60 m NR (2012)
Medal record
Representing Turkey
Islamic Solidarity Games
Silver medal – second place	2013 Palembang	Javelin throw
Summer Universiades
Gold medal – first place	2011 Shenzhen	Javelin throw
Bronze medal – third place	2013 Kazan	Javelin throw
European Athletics U23 Championships
Silver medal – second place	2011 Ostrava	Javelin
European Cup Winter Throwing
Gold medal – first place	2011 Sofia	U-23 Javelin
Mediterranean Games
Gold medal – first place	2009 Pescara	Javelin
Gold medal – first place	2013 Mersin	Javelin

Fatih Avan (born 1 January 1989) is a former Turkish athlete competing in the javelin throw. The 183 cm (6 ft 0 in) tall athlete at 90 kg (200 lb) is a member of Fenerbahçe Athletics team, where he is coached by Metin Altıntaş.

== Career ==
Avan participated in the 2009 Mediterranean Games in Pescara, Italy and won the gold medal with a personal best throw of 79.78 m. At the 9th European Winter Throwing Cup held on 14 March 2009 in Los Realejos on Tenerife, Spain, he ranked third throwing the javelin 74.82 m.

Avan is broke the Turkish record with a mark of 77.15 m in June 2009 in Bursa. He represented Turkey at the 2009 World Championships in Athletics, but did not make it past the qualifying round.

In 2011 he improved his Turkish record to 81.16 m, clearing the eighty-metre mark for the first time, and the performance brought him the under-23 gold at the 2011 European Cup Winter Throwing.

In 2011 he improved his Turkish record to 84.11 m, and won silver medal at the 2011 European Athletics U23 Championships in Ostrava, Czech Republic.

He set a new national record with 85.60 m at the Turkish Super League held on 20 May 2012 in İzmir. The former record belonged also him with 84.79 m. Avan was qualified before to participate at the 2012 Summer Olympics.

He won the silver medal at the 2013 Islamic Solidarity Games held in Palembang, Indonesia.

== Achievements ==
Year	Competition	Venue	Position	Notes
Representing Turkey
2009	16th Mediterranean Games	Pescara, Italy	1st	79.78 m
2009	25th Summer Universiade	Belgrade, Serbia	11th	73.31 m
2009	European U23 Championships	Kaunas, Lithuania	7th	75.50 m
2009	12th World Championships	Berlin, Germany	19th (q)	78.12 m
2011	8th European U23 Championships	Ostrava, Czech Republic	2nd	84.11 m NR
2011	11th European Cup Winter Throwing U-23	Sofia, Bulgaria	1st	80.19 m
2011	26th Summer Universiade	Shenzhen, China	1st	83.79 m
2011	13th World Championships	Daegu, South Korea	5th	83.34 m
2013	17th Mediterranean Games	Mersin, Turkey	1st	83.84 m
2013	27th Summer Universiade	Kazan, Russia	3rd	81.24 m
2013	14th World Championships	Moscow, Russia	13th (q)	80.09 m
2013	3rd Islamic Solidarity Games	Palembang, Indonesia	2nd	78.15 m

== Seasonal bests by year ==
- 2008 – 71.73
- 2009 – 79.78
- 2010 – 79.13
- 2011 – 84.79
- 2012 – 85.60
- 2013 – 84.58
- 2014 – 83.05
- 2015 – 81.45
