= 2018 African Championships in Athletics – Men's javelin throw =

The men's javelin throw event at the 2018 African Championships in Athletics was held on 5 August in Asaba, Nigeria.

== Results ==
Rank	Athlete	Nationality	#1	#2	#3	#4	#5	#6	Result	Notes
1st place, gold medalist(s)	Julius Yego	Kenya	77.27	77.34	x	x	–	74.78	77.34	
2nd place, silver medalist(s)	Phil-Mar van Rensburg	South Africa	76.57	69.01	x	75.39	73.46	74.86	76.57	
3rd place, bronze medalist(s)	Samuel Kure Adams	Nigeria	75.69	68.14	x	73.53	74.59	73.65	75.69	
4	Johan Grobler	South Africa	71.01	72.72	74.49	74.36	72.97	x	74.49	
5	Alexander Kiprotich	Kenya	73.47	72.80	70.33	x	71.01	72.65	73.47	
6	Maged Amer	Egypt	68.43	68.31	68.98	x	68.40	63.88	68.98	
7	Claude Chamaken	Cameroon	68.63	65.37	67.93	60.70	64.14	x	68.63	NR
8	Anro van Eeden	South Africa	65.21	x	66.32	63.89	x	63.35	66.32	
9	Aliye Shiferaw	Ethiopia	63.08	x	64.68				64.68	
10	Romeo Manzila Mahambou	Republic of the Congo	49.41	56.33	x				56.33	
11	José Mombe Adjomo	Equatorial Guinea	35.8?	32.88	36.12				36.12	
	Romaric Houenou	Benin	x	x	x				NM	
	Lormans Mansiantima-Yitu	Democratic Republic of the Congo							DNS	
	Jean Douanio	Burkina Faso							DNS	
