= 2022 African Championships in Athletics – Men's javelin throw =

The men's javelin throw event at the 2022 African Championships in Athletics was held on 12 June in Port Louis, Mauritius.

== Results ==
Rank	Athlete	Nationality	#1	#2	#3	#4	#5	#6	Result	Notes
1st place, gold medalist(s)	Julius Yego	Kenya	79.62	77.82	78.57	x	–	79.62		
2nd place, silver medalist(s)	Ihab Abdelrahman	Egypt	72.93	77.12	72.79	x	73.66	71.63	77.12	
3rd place, bronze medalist(s)	Phillippus Janse van Rensburg	South Africa	57.11	74.10	69.54	64.77	61.90	x	74.10	
4	Johann Grobler	South Africa	68.89	70.74	71.98	73.82	x	68.90	73.82	
5	Alexander Kiprotich	Kenya	70.36	68.21	x	69.36	x	68.32	70.36	
6	Maged Mohser El Badry	Egypt	63.19	60.70	70.19	67.53	63.10	60.55	70.19	
7	Otagi Ogulla	Ethiopia	61.04	64.22	68.97	x	66.20	65.44	68.97	
8	Adams Kure	Nigeria	61.77	66.30	67.04	x	33.67	x	67.04	
9	Othow Okello	Ethiopia	65.04	60.56	64.30				65.04	
10	Romaric Houenou	Benin	58.25	x	59.88				59.88	
	Yannick Kibaya	Republic of the Congo							DNS	
	Kareem Hussein	Egypt							DNS	
	Nafew Mohammed	Ghana							DNS	
