= 2006 African Championships in Athletics – Men's javelin throw =

The men's javelin throw event at the 2006 African Championships in Athletics was held at the Stade Germain Comarmond on August 13.

== Results ==
Rank	Name	Nationality	#1	#2	#3	#4	#5	#6	Result	Notes
1st place, gold medalist(s)	Gerhardus Pienaar	South Africa	73.30	77.14	70.69	77.55	x	x	77.55	
2nd place, silver medalist(s)	Gerbrandt Grobler	South Africa	72.91	75.50	x	75.95	x	70.30	75.95	
3rd place, bronze medalist(s)	Walid Abdel Wahab	Egypt	65.99	69.86	67.29	x	66.63	68.65	69.86	
4	David Lam Vo Hee	Mauritius	61.48	61.09	59.63	59.97	54.68	61.73	61.73	
5	Fabio Ramsamy	Mauritius	60.92	61.27	61.03	59.61	57.05	x	61.27	
6	Moctar Djigui	Mali	x	55.35	54.97	57.41	x	56.38	57.41	
