= Erich Wiese =

German museum director

Erich Wiese (30 August 1891 – 24 November 1979) was a German art historian and museum director.

== Life ==
Erich Wiese was born on 30 August 1891 in Liebau (today Lubawka) in Silesia. He was the son of a locomotive stoker from Liebau. He studied at the universities of Jena, Munich, Göttingen, Lausanne and Wrocław. In 1920, he received his doctorate from the Friedrich Wilhelm University of Silesia in Wrocław with a thesis entitled Die Breslauer Holzplastik von ihren Anfängen bis zum Ausgang des weichen Stils. He worked as an art historian at the Silesian Museum of Fine Arts in Wrocław, where he was appointed curator in 1925. In 1929, he became director of the museum, which he continued to expand to include works by expressionist artists such as George Grosz and Otto Dix.

== Persecution during the Nazi era ==
Because of his commitment to modern art, he was removed from his position by the Nazis on 23 June 1933. His successor was Cornelius Müller-Hofstede, who was employed at the Breslau Art Museum in 1934 and appointed full museum director two years later.

After his release, Wiese moved to Hirschberg in the Giant Mountains (now Jelenia Góra), where he worked as a private scholar and ran an antiquarian bookshop.

== Postwar ==
After the end of World War II, he left Silesia in 1945 and settled in Auerbach (Bensheim) after living in Bavaria for a short time. In 1950, he became director of the Hessian State Museum in Darmstadt. He promoted the acquisition of works of classical modernism for the museum and was able to gain the support of the entrepreneur Karl Ströher (co-owner of the Wella Group in Darmstadt), who was considered "one of the most important patrons and collectors of modern art" in Germany in the 1960s and 1970s. Wiese was director of the museum until 1959, when he retired. His successor was Gerhard Bott. Wiese held an honorary professorship at the Technical University in Darmstadt from 1952.

Wiese died on 24 November 1979 in Munich.

== Awards ==
- 1967: Georg-Dehio-Preis der Künstlergilde Esslingen

== Publications (selection) ==
- Schlesische Plastik vom Beginn des XIV. bis Mitte des XV. Jahrhunderts. Klinkhardt & Biermann, Leipzig 1923.
- Paul Gauguin. Zwei Jahrzehnte nach seinem Tod (= Junge Kunst in Europa, Band 36). Klinkhardt & Biermann, Leipzig 1923.
- Alexander Archipenko (= Junge Kunst in Europa, Band 40). Klinkhardt & Biermann, Leipzig 1923.
- mit Heinz Braune und unter Mitwirkung von Ernst Kloss (Hrsg.): Schlesische Malerei und Plastik des Mittelalters. Kritischer Katalog der Ausstellung in Breslau 1926. Ausstellungskatalog. Alfred Kröner Verlag, Leipzig 1929.
- mit Karl Ströher: Ausstellung Kunst unserer Zeit. Privatsammlung Karl Ströher. Juni–September 1954. Ausstellungskatalog. Hessisches Landesmuseum Darmstadt, Darmstadt 1954.
- Deutsche Kultur im Osten. Ständige Ausstellung in Wiesbaden, "Haus der Heimat". Katalog. Hessischer Kultusminister, Wiesbaden (um 1966).
- Biedermeierreise durch Schlesien. J. G. Bläschke Verlag, Darmstadt 1966.

== See also ==
- Degenerate art
- Max Silberberg
- Ismar Littmann Art Collection
- Leo Smoschewer

== Literature ==
- Magdalena Palica / Dagmar Schmengler: Erich Wiese. Schlesisches Museum der bildenden Künste in Breslau. In: Dagmar Schmengler u. a. (Hgg.): Maler. Mentor. Magier. Otto Mueller und sein Netzwerk in Breslau, Heidelberg u. a.: Kehrer 2018. ISBN 978-3-86828-873-5, pp. 48–51.
- Wiese, Erich, in: Ulrike Wendland: Biographisches Handbuch deutschsprachiger Kunsthistoriker im Exil. Leben und Werk der unter dem Nationalsozialismus verfolgten und vertriebenen Wissenschaftler. Munich: Saur, 1999, ISBN 3-598-11339-0, pp. 765–767
