= Egypt at the 2015 World Championships in Athletics =

- WA code: EGY

in Beijing
- Competitors: 3
- Medals Ranked 25th: Gold 0 Silver 1 Bronze 0 Total 1

World Championships in Athletics appearances
- 1983; 1987; 1991; 1993; 1995; 1997; 1999; 2001; 2003; 2005; 2007; 2009; 2011; 2013; 2015; 2017; 2019; 2022; 2023

Egypt competed at the 2015 World Championships in Athletics in Beijing, China, from 22 to 30 August 2015.

== Medalists ==
| Medal | Athlete | Event | Date |
|---|---|---|---|
| Silver | Ihab El-Sayed | Javelin throw | 26 August |

== Results ==
(q – qualified, NM – no mark, SB – season best)

=== Men ===
Field events

| Athlete | Event | Qualification | | Final | |
| Athlete | Event | Distance | Position | Distance | Position |
|---|---|---|---|---|---|
| Mostafa Amr Hassan | Shot put | 19.65 | 18 | Did not advance | |
| Mostafa Al-Gamel | Hammer throw | 75.48 | 8 q | 76.81 | 7 |
| Ihab El-Sayed | Javelin throw | 82.85 | 8 q | 88.99 SB | 2nd place, silver medalist(s) |
