= Dmitry Tarabin =

Russian javelin thrower

Dmitriy Tarabin
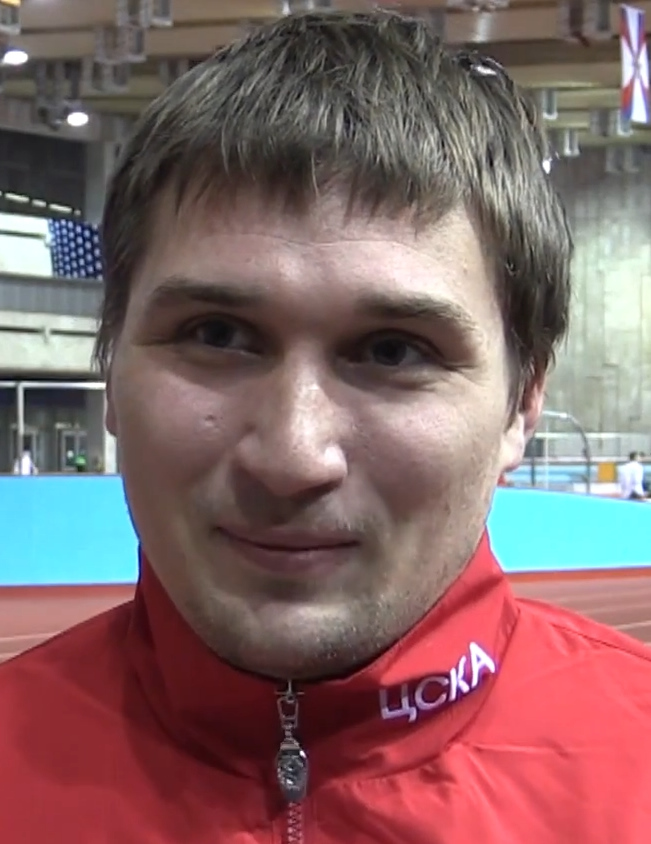
- Tarabin in 2015

Personal information
- Full name: Dmitriy Sergeyevich Tarabin
- Nationality: Russian, Moldovan
- Born: 29 October 1991 (age 34) Berlin, Germany
- Height: 1.82 m (6 ft 0 in)
- Weight: 94 kg (207 lb)
- Spouse: Mariya Abakumova

Sport
- Country: Russia
- Sport: Track and field
- Event: Javelin throw
- Coached by: Mikhail Mikheyev

Achievements and titles
- Personal best: Javelin throw: 88.84 (2013)
Medal record
World Championships
| Bronze medal – third place | 2013 Moscow | Javelin throw |
Summer Universiade
| Gold medal – first place | 2013 Kazan | Javelin throw |
- Updated on 18 August 2013

Dmitriy Sergeyevich Tarabin (Russian: Дмитрий Серге́евич Тарабин; born 29 October 1991) is a Russian track and field athlete who competes in the javelin throw. His personal best for the event is 88.84 m (291 ft 5 1/2 in). He was the winner of the javelin at Summer Universiade and the Russian Championships in 2013. Tarabin previously competed for Moldova and remains the country's national record holder.

He took part in javelin competitions from a relatively early age and progressed through the age categories, taking bronze medals at the 2010 World Junior Championships in Athletics and the 2011 European Athletics U23 Championships. He represented Russia at the 2011 World Championships in Athletics, coming tenth, but missed the 2012 Summer Olympics as he was affected by an injury. He is married to Mariya Abakumova, who is also a javelin thrower for Russia.

== Early life ==
Born in Berlin, Germany, Tarabin's physical education was stressed from a young age by his father, who was a Moldovan military officer. Around 1997 his family moved back to Transnistria in Moldova. He took part in a variety of sports while at school, including boxing and tennis. It was baseball that he first got heavily involved in – his ability to throw the ball far (albeit inaccurately) led to his inclusion in the national squad for the European Youth Baseball Championship. This talent translated well to javelin throwing and he began training in the sport with his local athletics club.

Tarabin's first international appearance in the javelin came at the 2007 World Youth Championships in Athletics, where he competed in the qualifying round. He placed eleventh in the javelin at the 2007 European Cup and improved to 67.39 metres the following year 2008 European Cup, taking fourth in the Second League. He threw a best of 69.63 m to win in the Third League of the 2009 European Team Championships and also competed in the qualifiers of the 2009 European Athletics Junior Championships. After graduating from high school he began attending the Moscow sports college, training under Mikhail Mikheyev. Following the move he quickly improved, opening his 2010 season with a Moldovan record of 74.78 metres. The improved training conditions and financial support led him to transfer to compete for Russia internationally from June 2010 onwards (he already held dual-citizenship).

== Competing for Russia ==
Just weeks after choosing to compete as a Russian athlete he won the Russian Junior Championships with a personal best throw of 77.65 metres. The following month he won his first global medal by taking bronze at the 2010 World Junior Championships in Athletics. The start of the 2011 season saw him win two bronze medals at under-23 level, first at the 2011 European Cup Winter Throwing and then at the 2011 European Athletics U23 Championships. A personal best of 85.10 metres brought him the Russian under-23 title. A third-place finish at the Russian Championships in Athletics gained him selection for the 2011 World Championships in Athletics in Daegu. In his first major competition he reached the final and finished in tenth place. His new best ranked him the ninth best in the world that year. His participation in Daegu also marked the development of his relationship with Mariya Abakumova, another Russian javelin specialist who won the gold medal in her event with a championship record.

Tarabin had a good start to the 2012 season, winning the silver medal at the 2012 European Cup Winter Throwing meet then throwing a season's best of 82.75 metres at the Colorful Daegu Meeting. He injured his right shoulder while competing at the Golden Spike Ostrava meet and managed only fourth at the national championships, missing out on a place in the Russian Olympic team. Away from competition, he flew constantly from Moscow to Krasnodar to see Abakumova and the pair decided to marry after the 2012 Summer Olympics. Tarabin chose to move to Krasnodar to train alongside his partner and although he kept working with his coach, Mikheyev, he also began working with Abakumova's coach, Heino Puuste.

Fully recovered from his injury, he began 2013 with a new best of 85.63 metres in February. He had his first top-three finish on the IAAF Diamond League circuit (third at the Shanghai Golden Grand Prix) and won the IAAF World Challenge Beijing meet. An improvement to 85.99 metres to win at the 2013 European Team Championships helped Russia to win the team title. He gained further Diamond League points with a third-place finish at the British Grand Prix in Birmingham and a runner-up finish at the Herculis meeting. He and his wife won the javelin gold medals at the Summer Universiade held in Kazan. The Russian championships was held at the Luzhniki Stadium as a test event for the 2013 World Championships in Athletics to be held there the month after. Tarabin responded to the occasion by winning his first national title with a throw of 88.84 m – the best throw by any athlete in the world in almost two years.

== Seasonal bests by year ==
- 2009 – 69.63
- 2010 – 77.65
- 2011 – 85.10
- 2012 – 82.75
- 2013 – 88.84
- 2014 – 85.92
- 2015 – 84.70
