= Egypt at the 2011 World Championships in Athletics =

- WA code: EGY
- National federation: Egyptian Athletic Federation
- Website: www.eaf-eg.org

in Daegu
- Competitors: 5
- Medals: Gold 0 Silver 0 Bronze 0 Total 0

World Championships in Athletics appearances
- 1983; 1987; 1991; 1993; 1995; 1997; 1999; 2001; 2003; 2005; 2007; 2009; 2011; 2013; 2015; 2017; 2019; 2022; 2023

Egypt competed at the 2011 World Championships in Athletics from August 27 to September 4 in Daegu, South Korea. A team of 5 athletes was announced to represent the country in the event.

== Results ==
=== Men ===
Athlete	Event	Preliminaries		Heats		Semifinals		Final	
Athlete	Event	Time Width Height	Rank	Time Width Height	Rank	Time Width Height	Rank	Time Width Height	Rank
Amr Ibrahim Mostafa Seoud	200 metres			20.44 SB	3	21.15	18	Did not advance	
Mohamed Fathalla Difallah	Long jump	NM						Did not advance	
Mostafa Al-Gamel	Hammer throw	68.38	30					Did not advance	
Ihab Abdelrahman El Sayed	Javelin throw	71.99 SB	35					Did not advance	

=== Women ===
Athlete	Event	Preliminaries		Heats		Semifinals		Final	
Athlete	Event	Time Width Height	Rank	Time Width Height	Rank	Time Width Height	Rank	Time Width Height	Rank
Inas Gharib	Long jump	5.48 (SB)	34					Did not advance	
