= John Robert Oosthuizen =

South African javelin thrower

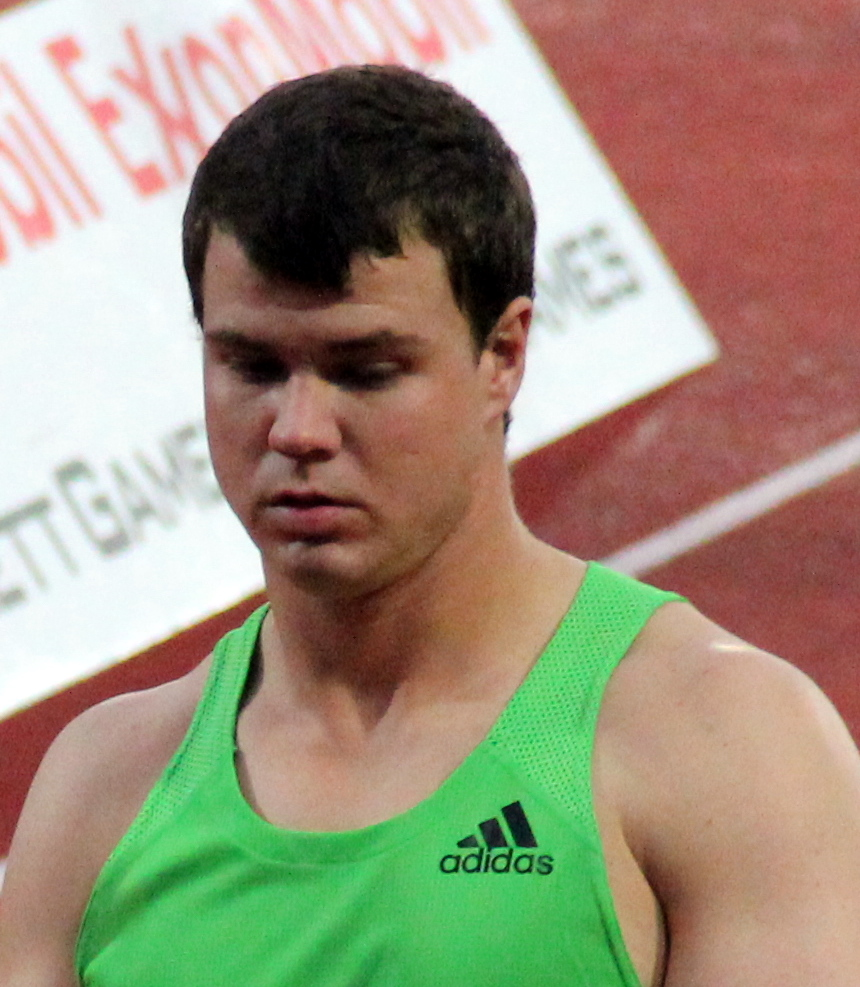
- Oosthuizen at the 2011 Bislett Games

Personal information
- Nationality: South African
- Born: 23 January 1987 (age 39)
- Height: 1.88 m (6 ft 2 in)
- Weight: 105 kg (231 lb) (2013)

Sport
- Sport: Track and field
- Event: Javelin throw
- College team: Cape Peninsula University of Technology
Medal record
Men's athletics
Representing South Africa
African Games
Gold medal – first place	2007 Algiers	Javelin throw
African Championships
Bronze medal – third place	2014 Marrakesh	Javelin throw
- Updated on 27 August 2016

John Robert Oosthuizen (born 23 January 1987) is a former South African javelin thrower. He stepped away from competition around 2019. He is a second generation athlete following in his father Johan Oosthuizen's footstep. Oosthuizen senior's, who never got the chance to represent his country in international competition, biggest achievement is a throw of 80.92 metres, which he achieved in 1990.

Oosthuizen junior's personal best throw is 86.80 metres which he achieved at the Yellow Pages meeting in Oudsthoorn on 1 March 2008. The throw was better than his 84.52 metres, achieved at the 2007 World Championships in Osaka and helped him to qualify for the 2008 Olympic Games in Beijing.

== Achievements ==
Year	Competition	Venue	Position	Event	Notes
Representing South Africa
2003	World Youth Championships	Sherbrooke, Canada	2nd	Javelin throw (700g)	81.07 m
2005	African Junior Championships	Radès, Tunisia	1st	Javelin throw	75.94 m
2006	Commonwealth Games	Melbourne, Australia	5th	Javelin throw	78.32 m
2006	World Junior Championships	Beijing, China	1st	Javelin throw	83.07 m
2007	All-Africa Games	Algiers, Algeria	1st	Javelin throw	78.05 m
2007	World Championships	Osaka, Japan	6th	Javelin throw	84.52 m
2008	Olympic Games	Beijing, China	19th (q)	Javelin throw	76.16 m
2009	World Championships	Berlin, Germany	44th (q)	Javelin throw	67.86 m
2011	World Championships	Daegu, South Korea	33rd (q)	Javelin throw	73.14 m
2012	African Championships	Porto-Novo, Benin	7th	Javelin throw	62.13 m
2013	Universiade	Kazan, Russia	2nd	Javelin throw	81.63 m
2013	World Championships	Moscow, Russia	31st (q)	Javelin throw	74.36 m
2014	African Championships	Marrakesh, Morocco	3rd	Javelin throw	77.81 m

== Seasonal bests by year ==
- 2005 – 75.94
- 2006 – 83.07
- 2007 – 84.52
- 2008 – 86.80
- 2009 – 81.18
- 2010 – 82.96
- 2011 – 84.38
- 2012 – 77.18
- 2013 – 81.97
- 2014 – 79.57
