= Egypt at the 2017 World Championships in Athletics =

- WA code: EGY

in London
- Competitors: 4 in 4 events
- Medals Ranked 0th: Gold 0 Silver 0 Bronze 0 Total 0

World Championships in Athletics appearances
- 1983; 1987; 1991; 1993; 1995; 1997; 1999; 2001; 2003; 2005; 2007; 2009; 2011; 2013; 2015; 2017; 2019; 2022; 2023; 2025

Egypt competed at the 2017 World Championships in Athletics in London, United Kingdom, from 4 to 13 August 2017.

== Results ==
(q – qualified, NM – no mark, SB – season best)

The results were as follows:

=== Men ===
Track and road events

Athlete	Event	Heat		Semifinal		Final	
Athlete	Event	Result	Rank	Result	Rank	Result	Rank
Hamada Mohamed	800 metres	DNF	–	Did not advance			

Field events

Athlete	Event	Qualification		Final	
Athlete	Event	Distance	Position	Distance	Position
Mostafa Amr Hassan	Shot put	19.23	30	Did not advance	
Hassan Mohamed Mahmoud	Hammer throw	69.92	29	Did not advance	

=== Women ===
Track and road events

Athlete	Event	Heat		Semifinal		Final	
Athlete	Event	Result	Rank	Result	Rank	Result	Rank
Lina Ahmed	100 metres hurdles	13.78 SB	39	Did not advance			
