= Noël Meyer =

South African javelin thrower

Personal information
- Born: 20 April 1988 (age 38)

Sport
- Country: South Africa
- Sport: Athletics
- Event: Javelin throw

Achievements and titles
- Personal best: Javelin throw: 75.19 m (2006)

Noël Meyer (born 20 April 1988) is a South African male javelin thrower, who won an individual gold medal at the Youth World Championships.
