= Egypt at the 2009 World Championships in Athletics =

- WA code: EGY

in Berlin
- Competitors: 4 (all male)
- Medals: Gold 0 Silver 0 Bronze 0 Total 0

World Championships in Athletics appearances
- 1983; 1987; 1991; 1993; 1995; 1997; 1999; 2001; 2003; 2005; 2007; 2009; 2011; 2013; 2015; 2017; 2019; 2022; 2023

Egypt competed at the 2009 World Championships in Athletics from 15–23 August in Berlin.

== Team selection ==
Track and road events

Event	Athletes	
Event	Men	Women
200 metres	Amr Ibrahim Mostafa Seoud	

Field and combined events

Event	Athletes	
Event	Men	Women
Shot put	Yasser Ibrahim Farag	
Discus throw	Omar Ahmed El Ghazaly	
Hammer throw	Mohsen El Anany	

== Results ==
Track and road events

Event	Athletes	Heats		Quarterfinals		Semifinal		Final	
Event	Athletes	Result	Rank	Result	Rank	Result	Rank	Result	Rank
200 m	Amr Ibrahim Mostafa Seoud	21.44	51	did not advance					

Field and combined events

Event	Athletes	Qualification		Final	
Event	Athletes	Result	Rank	Result	Rank
Shot put	Yasser Ibrahim Farag	18.69	32	did not advance	
Discus throw	Omar Ahmed El Ghazaly	62.84	10	62.83	9
Hammer throw	Mohsen El Anany	72.68	20	did not advance	
