= Egypt at the 2019 World Athletics Championships =

- WA code: EGY

in Doha, Qatar 27 September 2019 – 6 October 2019
- Competitors: 5 (4 men and 1 woman) in 4 events
- Medals: Gold 0 Silver 0 Bronze 0 Total 0

World Athletics Championships appearances
- 1983; 1987; 1991; 1993; 1995; 1997; 1999; 2001; 2003; 2005; 2007; 2009; 2011; 2013; 2015; 2017; 2019; 2022; 2023

Egypt competed at the 2019 World Athletics Championships in Doha, Qatar, from 27 September to 6 October 2019. Egypt will send only one athlete.

== Results ==
(q – qualified, NM – no mark, SB – season best)

=== Men ===
Track and road events

Athlete	Event	Heat		Semifinal		Final	
Athlete	Event	Result	Rank	Result	Rank	Result	Rank
Salem Mohamed Attiaallah	3000 m steeplechase	8:35.18	35	—		did not advance	

Field events

Athlete	Event	Qualification		Final	
Athlete	Event	Result	Rank	Result	Rank
Mostafa Amr Hassan	Shot put	20.55	14	did not advance	
Mohamed Magdi Hamza	Shot put	19.91	25	did not advance	
Mostafa El Gamel	Hammer throw	70.45	30	did not advance	

=== Women ===
Track and road events

Athlete	Event	Heat		Semifinal		Final	
Athlete	Event	Result	Rank	Result	Rank	Result	Rank
Bassant Hemida	200 m	22.88	16 q	22.92	14	did not advance	
