= Egypt at the 1983 World Championships in Athletics =

- Flag of Egypt
- WA code: EGY

in Helsinki, Finland August 7–14, 1983
- Competitors: 4 (4 men) in 4 events
- Medals: Gold 0 Silver 0 Bronze 0 Total 0

World Championships in Athletics appearances
- 1983; 1987; 1991; 1993; 1995; 1997; 1999; 2001; 2003; 2005; 2007; 2009; 2011; 2013; 2015; 2017; 2019; 2022; 2023

Egypt competed at the 1983 World Championships in Athletics in Helsinki, Finland, from August 7 to 14, 1983.

== Men ==
Track and road events

| Athlete | Event | Heat | | Quarterfinal | | Semifinal | | Final | |
| Athlete | Event | Result | Rank | Result | Rank | Result | Rank | Result | Rank |
|---|---|---|---|---|---|---|---|---|---|
| Nafi Ahmed Mersal | 400 metres | DNF | | Did not advance | | | | | |
| Ahmed Ghanem | 400 metres hurdles | 52.32 | 29 | — | | Did not advance | | | |

Field events

| Athlete | Event | Qualification | | Final | |
| Athlete | Event | Distance | Position | Distance | Position |
|---|---|---|---|---|---|
| Ahmed Kamel Shatta | Shot put | 16.73 | 19 | Did not advance | |
| Mohamed Naguib Hamed | Discus throw | 56.62 | 22 | Did not advance | |
