= Alexander Kiprotich =

Kenyan javelin thrower (born 1994)

Personal information
- Born: 10 October 1994 (age 31)

Sport
- Country: Kenya
- Sport: Athletics
- Event: Javelin throw
Medal record
Men's athletics
Representing Kenya
African Championships
Bronze medal – third place	2016 Durban	Javelin throw

Alexander Toroitich Kiprotich (born 10 October 1994) is a Kenyan javelin thrower.

He won the gold medal at the 2013 African Junior Championships, finished seventh at the 2014 African Championships, fourth at the 2015 African Games, seventh at the 2015 Military World Games, won the bronze medal at the 2016 African Championships, finished fifth at the 2018 African Championships and eleventh at the 2018 Commonwealth Games. He also competed at the 2014 Commonwealth Games without reaching the final.

His personal best throw is 78.84 metres, achieved in May 2015 in Eldoret.
