= Ihab Abdelrahman =

Egyptian javelin thrower (born 1989)

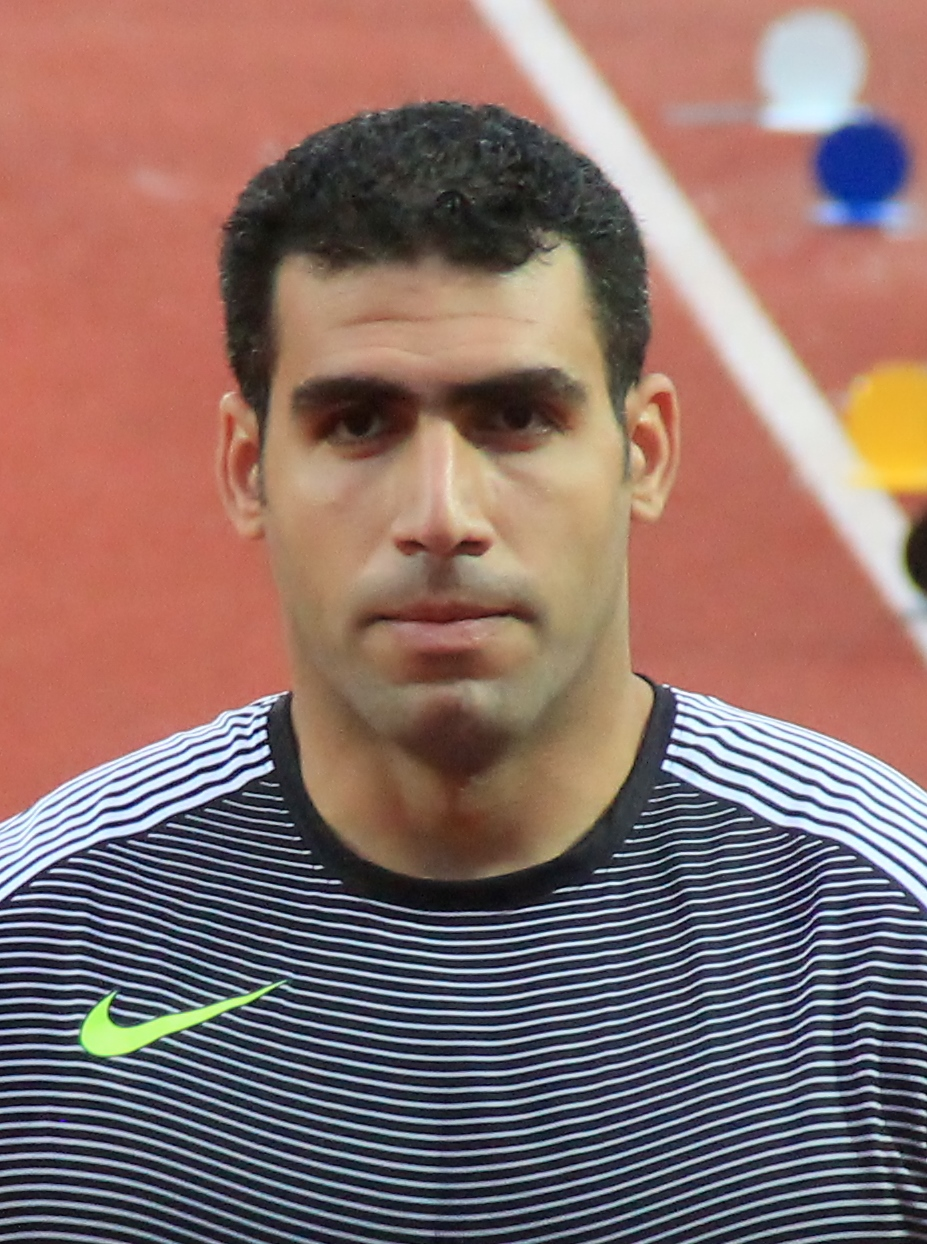
- Abdelrahman at the 2016 Bislett Games

Personal information
- Full name: Ihab El Sayed Abdelrahman
- Born: 1 May 1989 (age 37) Kafr Saqr, El Sharqia Governorate, Egypt
- Height: 1.94 m (6 ft 4 in)
- Weight: 96 kg (212 lb)

Sport
- Country: Egypt
- Sport: Track and field
- Event: Javelin throw
- Coached by: Petteri Piironen

Achievements and titles
- Personal bests: NR 89.21 m (2014)
Medal record
Men's athletics
Representing Egypt
World Championships
Silver medal – second place	2015 Beijing	Javelin throw
African Games
Gold medal – first place	2015 Brazzaville	Javelin throw
African Championships
Gold medal – first place	2010 Nairobi	Javelin throw
Silver medal – second place	2014 Marrakesh	Javelin throw
Silver medal – second place	2022 Saint Pierre	Javelin throw
Mediterranean Games
Silver medal – second place	2013 Mersin	Javelin throw
Silver medal – second place	2022 Oran	Javelin throw
World Junior Championships
Silver medal – second place	2008 Bydgoszcz	Javelin throw
African Junior Championships
Bronze medal – third place	2007 Ouagadougou	Javelin throw
- Updated on 26 August 2015

Ihab El Sayed Abdelrahman (Arabic: إيهاب عبد الرحمن; born 1 May 1989) is an Egyptian track and field athlete who competes in the javelin throw. His personal best of 89.21 m is the Egyptian record. El Sayed splits his time between Kuortane, Finland, where his coach Petteri Piironen is based, and Cairo, where he is a student. In 2016, he tested positive for a banned substance, and was banned from the 2016 Olympics. He competed at the 2020 Summer Olympics.

== Achievements ==
Year	Competition	Venue	Position	Notes
Representing Egypt
2007	African Junior Championships	Ouagadougou, Burkina Faso	3rd	65.63 m
2007	Pan Arab Games	Cairo, Egypt	2nd	71.15 m
2008	World Junior Championships	Bydgoszcz, Poland	2nd	76.20 m
2009	Mediterranean Games	Pescara, Italy	5th	74.47 m
2009	Universiade	Belgrade, Serbia	12th	68.43 m
2009	Jeux de la Francophonie	Beirut, Lebanon	1st	77.33 m
2010	African Championships	Nairobi, Kenya	1st	78.02 m
2011	Universiade	Shenzhen, China	14th (q)	67.96 m
2011	World Championships	Daegu, South Korea	35th (q)	71.99 m
2011	All-Africa Games	Maputo, Mozambique	5th	69.94 m
2011	Pan Arab Games	Doha, Qatar	1st	78.66 m
2012	African Championships	Porto-Novo, Benin	5th	67.82 m
2012	Olympic Games	London, United Kingdom	29th (q)	77.35 m
2013	Mediterranean Games	Mersin, Turkey	2nd	82.45 m
2013	Universiade	Kazan, Russia	12th	73.42 m
2013	World Championships	Moscow, Russia	7th	80.94 m
2013	Islamic Solidarity Games	Palembang, Indonesia	1st	78.96 m
2014	African Championships	Marrakesh, Morocco	2nd	83.59 m
2015	World Championships	Beijing, China	2nd	88.99 m
2015	African Games	Brazzaville, Republic of the Congo	1st	85.37 m
2021	Arab Championships	Radès, Tunisia	1st	79.93 m
2021	Olympic Games	Tokyo, Japan	13th (q)	81.92 m
2022	African Championships	Port Louis, Mauritius	2nd	77.12 m
2022	Mediterranean Games	Oran, Algeria	2nd	78.51 m
2022	World Championships	Eugene, United States	12th	75.99 m
2023	Arab Games	Oran, Algeria	1st	80.50 m
2023	World Championships	Budapest, Hungary	10th	80.64 m
2024	African Games	Accra, Ghana	4th	76.68 m
2024	Olympic Games	Paris, France	30th (q)	72.98 m

== Seasonal bests by year ==
- 2007 – 71.15
- 2008 – 76.20
- 2009 – 78.44
- 2010 – 81.84
- 2011 – 78.83
- 2012 – 82.25
- 2013 – 83.62
- 2014 – 89.21 AR
- 2015 – 88.99

Records
Preceded by Marius Corbett	Men's Javelin African Record Holder; 18 May 2014 – 7 June 2015	Succeeded by Julius Yego
