= 2008 World Junior Championships in Athletics – Men's javelin throw =

The men's javelin throw event at the 2008 World Junior Championships in Athletics was held in Bydgoszcz, Poland, at Zawisza Stadium on 9 and 11 July.

== Medalists ==
Gold	Robert Szpak; Poland
Silver	Ihab El-Sayed; Egypt
Bronze	Ansis Brūns; Latvia

== Results ==
=== Final ===
11 July

Rank	Name	Nationality	Attempts						Result	Notes
Rank	Name	Nationality	1	2	3	4	5	6	Result	Notes
1st place, gold medalist(s)	Robert Szpak	Poland	71.47	73.67	78.01	76.67	75.47	71.02	78.01	
2nd place, silver medalist(s)	Ihab El-Sayed	Egypt	76.20	69.88	70.10	75.72	x	73.40	76.20	
3rd place, bronze medalist(s)	Ansis Brūns	Latvia	59.97	72.23	70.15	x	x	75.31	75.31	
4	Jaakko Talvitie	Finland	67.43	69.37	70.25	68.10	71.80	74.47	74.47	
5	Hamish Peacock	Australia	68.99	71.71	x	72.81	72.00	74.44	74.44	
6	Bobur Shokirjonov	Uzbekistan	63.50	x	68.98	67.07	71.66	70.29	71.66	
7	Dmitriy Kosynskyy	Ukraine	62.05	66.49	69.59	66.70	64.98	65.79	69.59	
8	Tuomas Laaksonen	Finland	69.07	x	x	65.82	x	68.38	69.07	
9	Tanel Laanmäe	Estonia	68.88	68.35	68.09				68.88	
10	Jakub Vadlejch	Czech Republic	66.97	65.02	68.79				68.79	
11	Ugis Svaza	Latvia	67.49	67.16	65.45				67.49	
12	Emanuele Sabbio	Italy	65.21	x	62.19				65.21	

=== Qualifications ===
9 July

==== Group A ====
Rank	Name	Nationality	Attempts			Result	Notes
Rank	Name	Nationality	1	2	3	Result	Notes
1	Ihab El-Sayed	Egypt	67.94	71.06	69.31	71.06	q
2	Ansis Brūns	Latvia	67.06	70.61	66.05	70.61	q
3	Emanuele Sabbio	Italy	69.29	66.17	x	69.29	q
4	Jakub Vadlejch	Czech Republic	69.27	x	66.16	69.27	q
5	Tuomas Laaksonen	Finland	68.03	68.92	67.12	68.92	q
6	Maik Dolch	Germany	65.32	67.51	66.66	67.51	
7	Park Won-Kil	South Korea	x	65.63	64.46	65.63	
8	Nerijus Luckauskas	Lithuania	60.44	62.35	60.48	62.35	
9	Luke Laird	United States	60.28	61.73	x	61.73	
10	Piotr Frackiewicz	Poland	60.22	60.18	61.53	61.53	
11	Ranno Koorep	Estonia	60.13	59.80	59.67	60.13	
12	Lo Hung-Chang	Chinese Taipei	57.79	x	55.32	57.79	
	Makoto Yamazaki	Japan	x	x	x	NM	

==== Group B ====
Rank	Name	Nationality	Attempts			Result	Notes
Rank	Name	Nationality	1	2	3	Result	Notes
1	Robert Szpak	Poland	72.29	-	-	72.29	Q
2	Hamish Peacock	Australia	71.05	x	65.52	71.05	q
3	Ugis Svaza	Latvia	65.16	x	68.93	68.93	q
4	Bobur Shokirjonov	Uzbekistan	67.65	63.83	68.92	68.92	q
5	Tanel Laanmäe	Estonia	64.37	68.40	65.54	68.40	q
6	Jaakko Talvitie	Finland	65.19	67.79	-	67.79	q
7	Dmitriy Kosynskyy	Ukraine	67.69	66.69	65.74	67.69	q
8	Kim Amb	Sweden	65.20	67.59	63.14	67.59	
9	Franz Burghagen	Germany	x	67.42	66.96	67.42	
10	Mustafa Tan	Turkey	64.58	63.94	60.78	64.58	
11	Stipe Žunić	Croatia	62.36	62.38	62.44	62.44	
12	Alexandru Craescu	Romania	58.69	60.83	x	60.83	
13	Joni Kaartinen	Sweden	60.66	x	x	60.66	

== Participation ==
According to an unofficial count, 26 athletes from 20 countries participated in the event.

- Australia (1)
- Chinese Taipei (1)
- Croatia (1)
- Czech Republic (1)
- Egypt (1)
- Estonia (2)
- Finland (2)
- Germany (2)
- Italy (1)
- Japan (1)
- Latvia (2)
- Lithuania (1)
- Poland (2)
- Romania (1)
- South Korea (1)
- Sweden (2)
- Turkey (1)
- Ukraine (1)
- United States (1)
- Uzbekistan (1)
