= 2019 Asian Athletics Championships – Men's javelin throw =

Men's javelin throw at the 2019 Asian Athletics Championships
- Venue: Khalifa International Stadium
- Location: Doha, Qatar
- Dates: 22 April
- Competitors: 13 from 9 nations
- Winning distance: 86.72 m CR

Medalists
gold medal	Cheng Chao-tsun	Chinese Taipei
silver medal	Shivpal Singh	India
bronze medal	Ryohei Arai	Japan

The men's javelin throw at the 2019 Asian Athletics Championships was held on 22 April.

== Records ==
Records before the 2019 Asian Athletics Championships
Record	Athlete (nation)	Distance (m)	Location	Date
World record	Jan Železný (CZE)	98.48	Jena, East Germany	25 May 1986
Asian record	Cheng Chao-tsun (TPE)	91.36	Taipei, Taiwan	26 August 2017
Championship record	Neeraj Chopra (IND)	85.23	Bhubaneswar, India	9 July 2017
World leading	Anderson Peters (GRN)	86.07	Austin, United States	29 March 2019
Asian leading	Cheng Chao-tsun (TPE)	83.30	Singapore	28 March 2019

== Results ==
=== Final ===
Rank	Name	Nationality	#1	#2	#3	#4	#5	#6	Result	Notes
1st place, gold medalist(s)	Cheng Chao-tsun	Chinese Taipei	x	86.72	83.46	–	–	–	86.72	WL, CR
2nd place, silver medalist(s)	Shivpal Singh	India	80.89	86.23	x	79.96	81.39	77.48	86.23	PB
3rd place, bronze medalist(s)	Ryohei Arai	Japan	x	76.47	79.51	81.93	81.06	x	81.93	
4	Huang Shih-feng	Chinese Taipei	78.90	76.74	79.16	78.20	81.46	x	81.46	SB
5	Liu Qizhen	China	80.19	x	79.68	76.02	78.30	72.26	80.19	SB
6	Arshad Nadeem	Pakistan	73.33	78.55	77.36	x	78.29	x	78.55	SB
7	Ma Qun	China	72.25	73.46	72.91	72.26	76.31	73.00	76.31	
8	Sumeda Ranasinghe	Sri Lanka	72.29	72.48	71.83	71.68	73.02	73.50	73.50	
9	Bae Yu-il	South Korea	x	72.20	69.74				72.20	
10	Davinder Singh Kang	India	71.58	69.80	68.49				71.58	
11	Takuto Kominami	Japan	68.70	71.44	x				71.44	
12	Younis Mohsin Salih	Iraq	69.28	68.10	x				69.28	
13	Ricky Hui Wai Hei	Hong Kong	65.27	x	x				65.27	
