= 2009 European Athletics U23 Championships – Men's javelin throw =

Men's javelin throw event

The men's javelin throw event at the 2009 European Athletics U23 Championships was held in Kaunas, Lithuania, at S. Dariaus ir S. Girėno stadionas (Darius and Girėnas Stadium) on 16 and 18 July.

== Medalists ==
Gold	Ari Mannio; Finland
Silver	Petr Frydrych; Czech Republic
Bronze	Spiridon Lebesis; Greece

== Results ==
=== Final ===
18 July

Rank	Name	Nationality	Attempts						Result	Notes
Rank	Name	Nationality	1	2	3	4	5	6	Result	Notes
1st place, gold medalist(s)	Ari Mannio	Finland	80.47	79.52	77.78	x	80.33	84.57	84.57	CR
2nd place, silver medalist(s)	Petr Frydrych	Czech Republic	75.33	80.10	73.78	77.05	x	80.53	80.53	
3rd place, bronze medalist(s)	Spiridon Lebesis	Greece	75.74	x	79.03	79.37	79.36	78.69	79.37	
4	Roman Avramenko	Ukraine	76.57	78.46	75.33	75.32	75.40	x	78.46	
5	Thomas Smet	Belgium	74.32	74.98	77.84	75.85	x	70.95	77.84	
6	Maximilian Buchholz	Germany	76.11	x	x	71.77	72.01	72.89	76.11	
7	Fatih Avan	Turkey	x	75.50	x	75.12	75.27	x	75.50	
8	Matthias de Zordo	Germany	75.40	x	74.96	x	x	x	75.40	
9	Lassi Etelätalo	Finland	71.56	75.02	75.21				75.21	
10	Paweł Rakoczy	Poland	x	73.71	70.30				73.71	
11	Ioannis Smalios	Greece	73.30	x	71.75				73.30	
12	Mikko Kankaanpää	Finland	72.05	73.16	73.08				73.16	

=== Qualifications ===
16 July
Qualifying 76.00 or 12 best to the Final

==== Group A ====
Rank	Name	Nationality	Result	Notes
1	Ari Mannio	Finland	76.80	Q
2	Spiridon Lebesis	Greece	75.93	q
3	Fatih Avan	Turkey	74.76	q
4	Matthias de Zordo	Germany	73.34	q
5	Maximilian Buchholz	Germany	72.77	q
6	Roman Avramenko	Ukraine	72.59	q
7	James Campbell	Great Britain	72.57	
8	Erki Leppik	Estonia	72.00	
9	Vyacheslav Yankov	Russia	71.07	
10	Alexandru Crăescu	Romania	70.56	
11	Piotr Frąckiewicz	Poland	70.38	
12	Jonas Lohse	Sweden	67.80	
13	Ramūnas Butkus	Lithuania	67.08	
14	Ansis Brūns	Latvia	65.98	
15	Martins Pildavs	Latvia	63.55	

==== Group B ====
Rank	Name	Nationality	Result	Notes
1	Petr Frydrych	Czech Republic	77.56	Q
2	Thomas Smet	Belgium	77.03	Q
3	Mikko Kankaanpää	Finland	75.80	q
4	Paweł Rakoczy	Poland	75.40	q
5	Lassi Etelätalo	Finland	74.67	q
6	Ioannis Smalios	Greece	73.66	q
7	Anatoli Adakhouski	Belarus	72.11	
8	Robert Szpak	Poland	71.38	
9	Krisztián Török	Hungary	70.84	
10	Tanel Laanmäe	Estonia	68.35	
11	Bjorn Blommerde	Netherlands	64.75	
12	Emanuele Sabbio	Italy	64.35	
13	Lauris Jelsmanis	Latvia	63.11	
14	Pontus Thomée	Sweden	62.45	
15	Priit Dolenko	Estonia	61.71	

== Participation ==
According to an unofficial count, 30 athletes from 19 countries participated in the event.

- Belarus (1)
- Belgium (1)
- Czech Republic (1)
- Estonia (3)
- Finland (3)
- Germany (2)
- Great Britain (1)
- Greece (2)
- Hungary (1)
- Italy (1)
- Latvia (3)
- Lithuania (1)
- Netherlands (1)
- Poland (3)
- Romania (1)
- Russia (1)
- Sweden (2)
- Turkey (1)
- Ukraine (1)
