= Athletics at the 2019 Summer Universiade – Men's javelin throw =

The men's javelin throw event at the 2019 Summer Universiade was held on 9 and 11 July at the Stadio San Paolo in Naples.

== Medalists ==
Gold	Silver	Bronze
Andrian Mardare; Moldova	Edis Matusevičius; Lithuania	Ma Qun; China

== Results ==
=== Qualification ===
Qualification: 78.00 m (Q) or at least 12 best (q) qualified for the final.

Rank	Group	Name	Nationality	#1	#2	#3	Result	Notes
1	A	Edis Matusevičius	Lithuania	84.93			84.93	Q, NR
2	B	Ma Qun	China	78.77			78.77	Q
3	A	Norbert Rivasz-Tóth	Hungary	77.48	73.75	75.02	77.48	q
4	B	Teo Takala	Finland	x	75.93	–	75.93	q
5	A	Francisco Muse	Chile	75.36	70.98	x	75.36	q, SB
6	B	Johannes Grobler	South Africa	75.26	x	–	75.26	q
7	B	Andrian Mardare	Moldova	x	x	75.08	75.08	q
8	B	Vladislav Palyunin	Uzbekistan	72.61	73.66	73.86	73.86	q
9	B	Gen Naganuma	Japan	73.66	64.15	x	73.66	q
10	A	Maged Albadry	Egypt	70.07	70.11	73.65	73.65	q, PB
11	A	Roberto Orlando	Italy	70.14	68.16	72.14	72.14	q
12	A	Liam O'Brien	Australia	71.61	63.14	68.57	71.61	q
13	A	Tatsuya Sakamoto	Japan	70.63	x	71.27	71.27	
14	A	Rafał Gierek	Poland	71.06	70.15	68.04	71.06	
15	B	Abhishek Drall	India	69.97	70.19	70.96	70.96	
16	A	Taneli Juutinen	Finland	69.00	67.78	70.13	70.13	
17	B	Maximilian Slezak	Slovakia	65.87	x	69.55	69.55	
18	B	Paraskevas Batzavalis	Cyprus	66.92	62.80	–	66.92	
19	A	Kim Woo-jung	South Korea	65.83	x	66.63	66.63	
20	B	Rauno Liitmae	Estonia	x	52.51	60.27	60.27	
21	A	Chethaka Wijegunasinghe	Sri Lanka	52.47	54.47	51.77	54.47	
	B	Abd Hafiz	Indonesia	x	x	x	NM	

=== Final ===
Rank	Name	Nationality	#1	#2	#3	#4	#5	#6	Result	Notes
1st place, gold medalist(s)	Andrian Mardare	Moldova	79.88	82.40	80.00	x	80.00	79.10	82.40	
2nd place, silver medalist(s)	Edis Matusevičius	Lithuania	75.16	75.18	78.30	77.60	77.12	80.07	80.07	
3rd place, bronze medalist(s)	Ma Qun	China	79.48	x	79.62	77.01	74.27	x	79.62	
4	Teo Takala	Finland	74.81	77.79	68.65	x	x	x	77.79	
5	Norbert Rivasz-Tóth	Hungary	72.89	76.14	x	74.90	77.11	77.71	77.71	
6	Johannes Grobler	South Africa	74.87	x	73.61	73.92	75.69	74.17	75.69	
7	Gen Naganuma	Japan	68.62	75.37	68.69	x	–	x	75.37	
8	Liam O'Brien	Australia	73.27	75.04	74.50	73.92	73.79	70.21	75.04	
9	Roberto Orlando	Italy	71.07	74.76	70.97				74.76	PB
10	Francisco Muse	Chile	74.00	70.97	74.11				74.11	
11	Vladislav Palyunin	Uzbekistan	69.68	x	70.67				70.67	
12	Maged Albadry	Egypt	67.42	66.17	67.66				67.66	SB
