= Huang Shih-feng =

Taiwanese javelin thrower (born 1992)

Personal information
- Native name: 黃士峰
- Born: 2 March 1992 (age 34)
- Education: University of Taipei

Sport
- Country: Taiwan
- Sport: Athletics
Medal record
Asian Athletics Championships
Gold medal – first place	2015 Wuhan	Javelin
Summer Universiade
Silver medal – second place	2015 Gwangju	Javelin
Bronze medal – third place	2017 Taipei	Javelin
- Updated on 27 December 2016

Huang Shih-Feng (Chinese: 黃士峰; pinyin: Huáng Shìfēng; born 2 March 1992) is a Taiwanese track and field athlete who competes in the javelin throw. He is the Taiwanese record holder for the event with a personal best of 83.82 m (275 ft 0 in).

He won the gold medal at the 2015 Asian Athletics Championships and represented his country at the 2014 Asian Games. Huang was World Youth Champion in 2009.

== Career ==
Huang initially played association football as a child, but after the school team was disbanded he took up athletics around the age of 14. He continued with both sports and study, beginning a degree at Fu Jen Catholic University. He had his first international success in the youth category of the sport: entering the 2009 World Youth Championships in Athletics as a rank outsider, he surprised by topping the qualification with a throw of 74.75 m (245 ft 2 3/4 in) – a two-metre improvement on his lifetime best at that point. He reached the 74-metre mark in the final and declared himself shocked to have claimed the gold medal over Killian Durechou of France. He stepped up to the junior category the following year and managed a bronze medal at the 2010 Asian Junior Athletics Championships, behind his compatriot Cheng Chao-Tsun. He was unable to repeat global success at the 2010 World Junior Championships in Athletics, finishing the qualification round without a single valid mark.

Huang had a consistent level of improvement in his first three years throwing the senior weight javelin: in 2010 he threw 72.74 m (238 ft 7 3/4 in), then had a best of 73.63 m (241 ft 6 3/4 in) in 2011, and 76.54 m (251 ft 1 1/4 in) in 2012. He represented his nation at the 2013 Summer Universiade, placing 13th in the final. He threw beyond eighty metres for the first time at the 2013 East Asian Games and was rewarded with a Taiwanese national record of 82.11 m (269 ft 4 1/2 in) and a silver medal (losing only to China's Zhao Qinggang, some seven years his senior). He ranked third among Asian throwers that year, behind Zhao and Ivan Zaytsev.

He began 2014 with a win at the Golden Grand Prix in Tokyo, but his mark of 81.53 m (267 ft 5 3/4 in) proved to be his season's best. He threw nearly seven metres less at the 2014 Asian Games and finished down in ninth as a result. He was strong in the early season again in 2015, setting a mark of 81.48 m (267 ft 3 3/4 in) in March in Taipei City. A throw of 79.74 m (261 ft 7 1/4 in) proved sufficient to hold off both Uzbek Bobur Shokirjonov and Japan's Yukifumi Murakami at the 2015 Asian Athletics Championships, earning Huang his first major senior title. He was the first Taiwanese to win an Asian title in the javelin throw at either the Asian Athletics Championships or the Asian Games.

== International competitions ==
Year	Competition	Venue	Position	Notes
2009	World Youth Championships	Brixen, Italy	1st	74.00
2010	Asian Junior Championships	Hanoi, Vietnam	3rd	72.43
2010	World Junior Championships	Moncton, Canada	—	NM
2013	Universiade	Kazan, Russia	13th	72.84
2013	East Asian Games	Tianjin, China	2nd	82.11 NR
2014	Asian Games	Incheon, South Korea	9th	74.65
2015	Asian Championships	Wuhan, China	1st	79.74
2015	Universiade	Gwangju, South Korea	2nd	81.27
2015	World Championships	Beijing, China	27th (q)	75.72
2017	Asian Championships	Bhubaneswar, India	4th	81.27
2017	Universiade	Taipei, Taiwan	3rd	86.64
2018	Asian Games	Jakarta, Indonesia	9th	73.86
2019	Asian Championships	Doha, Qatar	4th	81.46
2021	Olympic Games	Tokyo, Japan	25th (q)	77.16
2023	Asian Games	Hangzhou, China	–	NM

== Seasonal progression ==
- 2010: 72.74 m (238 ft 7 3/4 in)
- 2011: 73.63 m (241 ft 6 3/4 in)
- 2012: 76.54 m (251 ft 1 1/4 in)
- 2013: 82.11 m (269 ft 4 1/2 in)
- 2014: 81.53 m (267 ft 5 3/4 in)
- 2015: 81.48 m (267 ft 3 3/4 in)
- 2016: 83.82 m (275 ft 0 in)
- 2017: 86.64 m (284 ft 3 in)
- 2018: 79.93 m (262 ft 2 3/4 in)
