= 2015 Asian Athletics Championships – Men's javelin throw =

The men's javelin throw event at the 2015 Asian Athletics Championships was held on June 6.

== Results ==
Rank	Name	Nationality	#1	#2	#3	#4	#5	#6	Result	Notes
1st place, gold medalist(s)	Huang Shih-Feng	Chinese Taipei	76.86	78.42	x	78.49	79.74	78.96	79.74	
2nd place, silver medalist(s)	Bobur Shokirjonov	Uzbekistan	72.24	71.68	76.35	74.86	77.58	79.09	79.09	
3rd place, bronze medalist(s)	Yukifumi Murakami	Japan	70.81	75.98	x	79.05	73.58	74.56	79.05	
4	Waruna Pedige	Sri Lanka	71.40	71.56	76.75	x	x	73.48	76.75	
5	Li Yingchang	China	72.60	72.98	x	73.17	75.84	73.64	75.84	
6	Ma Qun	China	73.02	71.80	68.70	68.31	74.84	73.88	74.84	
7	Cheng Chao-Tsun	Chinese Taipei	x	72.53	64.27	x	73.71	68.62	73.71	
8	Davinder Singh Kang	India	x	71.28	x	x	68.79	x	71.28	
9	Neeraj Chopra	India	65.28	70.50	x				70.50	
10	Deng Sheng	China	x	63.50	x				63.50	
11	Abd Hafiz	Indonesia	57.16	58.71	56.55				58.71	
12	Abdullah Al-Ghamdi	Saudi Arabia	55.53	x	–				55.53	
