= 2011 European Athletics U23 Championships – Men's javelin throw =

The men's javelin throw at the 2011 European Athletics U23 Championships was held at the Městský stadion on 14 and 16 July. The field included six throwers who had broken the 80 metre line that year. Till Wöschler of Germany, the 2010 World Junior Champion, won with a new personal best of 84.38 metres.

== Medalists ==
Gold	Till Wöschler; Germany (GER)
Silver	Fatih Avan; Turkey (TUR)
Bronze	Dmitry Tarabin; Russia (RUS)

== Schedule ==
Date	Time	Round
14 July 2011	15:30	Qualification Group A
14 July 2011	16:40	Qualification Group B
16 July 2011	17:25	Final

== Results ==
=== Qualification ===
Qualification: Qualification performance 76.00 (Q) or at least 12 best performers advance to the final.

Rank	Group	Athlete	Nationality	#1	#2	#3	Result	Notes
1	B	Thomas Röhler	Germany	78.08	–	–	78.08	Q, PB
2	A	Till Wöschler	Germany	75.24	77.72	–	77.72	Q
3	A	Fatih Avan	Turkey	76.93	–	–	76.93	Q
4	A	Łukasz Grzeszczuk	Poland	72.16	x	76.84	76.84	Q
5	A	Kim Amb	Sweden	73.18	76.71	–	76.71	Q, SB
6	B	Dmitry Tarabin	Russia	74.11	76.48	–	76.48	Q
7	A	Krzysztof Szalecki	Poland	75.69	–	–	75.69	q
8	B	Marcin Plener	Poland	67.57	70.68	73.40	73.40	q
9	A	Stipe Žunić	Croatia	70.44	71.72	70.34	71.72	q
10	A	Tanel Laanmäe	Estonia	71.35	70.91	x	71.35	q
11	B	Sampo Lehtola	Finland	69.93	71.08	71.15	71.15	q
12	B	Lars Timmerman	Netherlands	66.47	70.86	68.47	70.86	
13	A	Jani Kiiskilä	Finland	65.11	70.34	69.32	70.34	
14	A	Tuomas Saari	Finland	x	67.71	69.38	69.38	
15	B	Ranno Koorep	Estonia	67.29	69.15	x	69.15	
16	B	Vedran Samac	Serbia	68.12	68.07	x	68.12	
17	A	Ansis Brūns	Latvia	66.99	x	x	66.99	
18	A	Magnus Kirt	Estonia	66.32	x	64.14	66.32	SB
19	A	Manuel Uriz	Spain	66.21	64.21	x	66.21	
20	B	Aykut Tanriverdi	Turkey	64.40	x	x	64.40	
21	B	Alexandru Craescu	Romania	x	64.11	x	64.11	
	B	Jakub Vadlejch	Czech Republic	x	x	x	NM	
	B	Dmytro Kosynskyy	Ukraine	71.55	69.74	73.30	DQ	Doping

=== Final ===
Rank	Athlete	Nationality	#1	#2	#3	#4	#5	#6	Result	Notes
1st place, gold medalist(s)	Till Wöschler	Germany	84.38	77.19	x	–	–	–	84.38	PB
2nd place, silver medalist(s)	Fatih Avan	Turkey	77.56	73.42	x	82.24	84.08	84.11	84.11	
3rd place, bronze medalist(s)	Dmitry Tarabin	Russia	78.68	77.37	81.65	83.18	78.18	x	83.18	
4	Kim Amb	Sweden	78.53	74.20	78.85	77.83	79.48	x	79.48	PB
5	Łukasz Grzeszczuk	Poland	79.02	76.56	78.91	x	77.07	77.82	79.02	
6	Sampo Lehtola	Finland	73.78	73.65	78.50	76.81	x	x	78.50	PB
7	Thomas Röhler	Germany	77.67	74.87	x	78.20	x	x	78.20	PB
8	Tanel Laanmäe	Estonia	70.65	73.20	x				73.20	
9	Krzysztof Szalecki	Poland	68.39	x	71.94				71.94	
10	Marcin Plener	Poland	71.15	71.77	68.17				71.77	
11	Stipe Žunić	Croatia	69.48	x	69.53				69.53	
	Dmytro Kosynskyy	Ukraine	72.83	76.74	78.09	77.67	76.35	77.60	DQ	Doping

== Participation ==
According to an unofficial count, 23 athletes from 15 countries participated in the event.

- Croatia (1)
- Czech Republic (1)
- Estonia (3)
- Finland (3)
- Germany (2)
- Latvia (1)
- Netherlands (1)
- Poland (3)
- Romania (1)
- Russia (1)
- Serbia (1)
- Spain (1)
- Sweden (1)
- Turkey (2)
- Ukraine (1)
