= Liu Qizhen =

Chinese javelin thrower (born 1995)

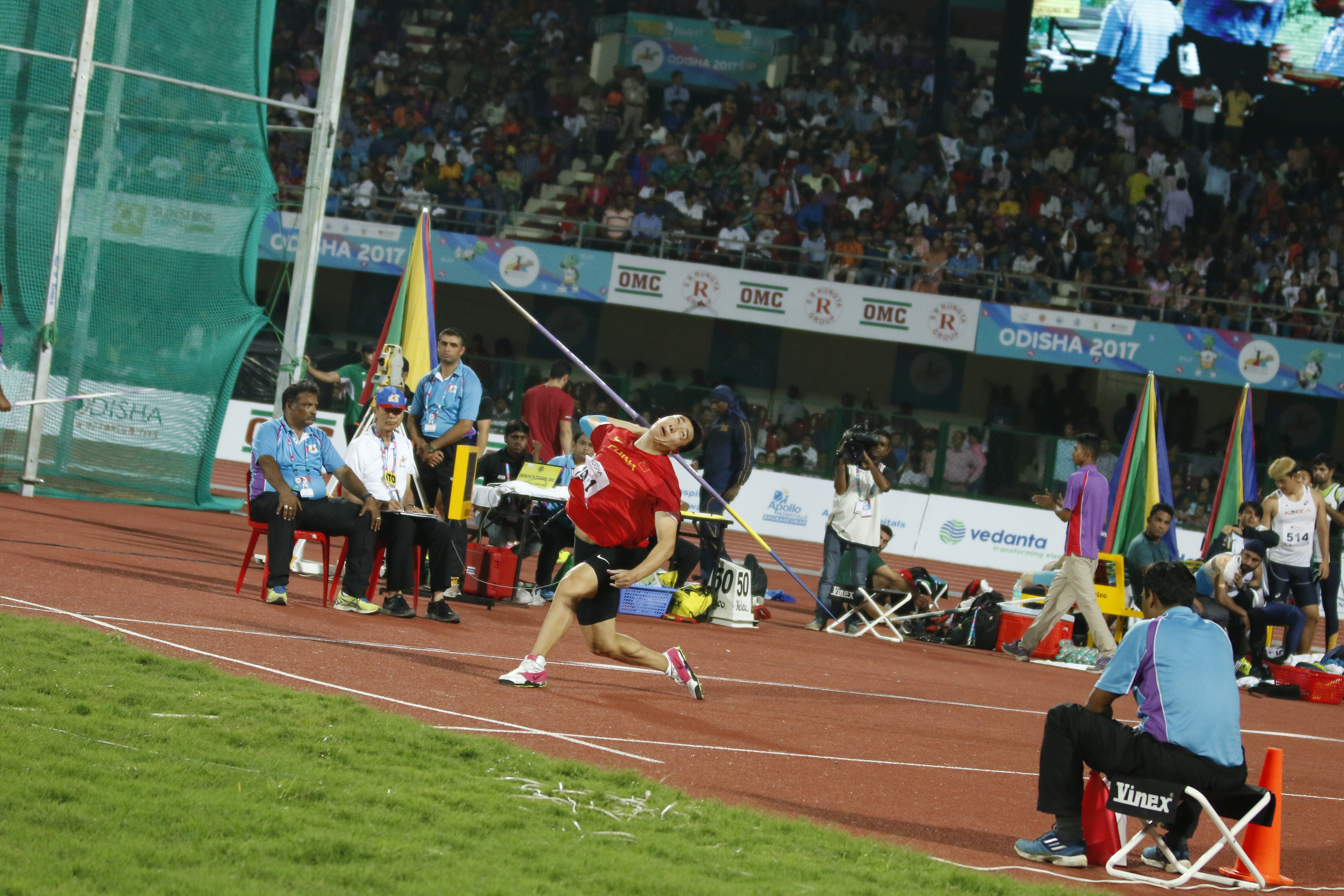
- Liu at the 2017 Asian Championships

Personal information
- Born: 17 September 1995 (age 30)

Sport
- Sport: Athletics
- Event: Javelin throw
Medal record
Men's athletics
Representing China
Asian Games
Silver medal – second place	2018 Jakarta	Javelin throw

Liu Qizhen (Chinese: 刘启祯; born 17 September 1995) is a Chinese athlete specialising in javelin throw. He clinched the silver medal at the 2018 Asian Games in Indonesia.

His personal best in the event is 82.22 metres set in Jakarta in 2018.

== International competitions ==
Year	Competition	Venue	Position	Event	Notes
Representing China
2017	Asian Championships	Bhubaneswar, India	5th	Javelin throw	80.12 m
2018	Asian Games	Jakarta, Indonesia	2nd	Javelin throw	82.22 m
2019	Asian Championships	Doha, Qatar	5th	Javelin throw	80.19 m
2019	World Championships	Doha, Qatar	25th (q)	Javelin throw	75.81 m
