= Ansis Brūns =

Latvian javelin thrower

Ansis Brūns (born 30 March 1989 in Ventspils) is a Latvian javelin thrower.

His current personal best throw is 81.28 metres, which was set at the 2014 European Athletics Championships.

With a throw results of 75.31 metres, he won a bronze medal at the 2008 World Junior Championships in Bydgoszcz, Poland.

In his youth years Ansis usually competed in decathlon, switching to javelin only later on.

== International competitions ==
Year	Competition	Venue	Position	Notes
Representing Latvia
2005	World Youth Championships	Marrakesh, Morocco	20th (q)	61.59 m
2007	European Junior Championships	Hengelo, Netherlands	13th	67.33 m
2008	World Junior Championships	Bydgoszcz, Poland	3rd	75.31 m
2009	European U23 Championships	Kaunas, Lithuania	24th (q)	65.98 m
2011	European U23 Championships	Ostrava, Czech Republic	17th (q)	66.99 m
2011	Universiade	Shenzhen, China	9th	74.91 m
2014	European Championships	Zurich, Switzerland	11th	72.24 m

== Personal bests ==
Event	Record	Venue	Year
Javelin	81.28 m	Zurich, Switzerland	2014

== Seasonal bests by year ==
- 2007 – 72.40
- 2008 – 75.31
- 2009 – 78.82
- 2010 – 79.35
- 2011 – 80.40
- 2012 – 75.00
- 2014 – 81.28
