= Muhammad Yasir (javelin thrower) =

Pakistani javelin thrower (born 1998)

Personal information
- Full name: Muhammad Yasir Sultan
- Born: 1 May 1998 (age 28) Punjab, Pakistan

Sport
- Sport: Athletics
- Event: Javelin throw

Achievements and titles
- Personal best: 79.93 m (2023)
Medal record
Men's athletics
Representing Pakistan
Asian Championships
Bronze medal – third place	2023 Bangkok	Javelin throw
Asian Throwing Championships
Silver medal – second place	2024 Mokpo	Javelin throw
Bronze medal – third place	2025 Mokpo	Javelin throw
Islamic Solidarity Games
Silver medal – second place	2025 Riyadh	Javelin throw

Muhammad Yasir Sultan (born 1 May 1998) is a Pakistani javelin thrower. He won the bronze medal at the 2023 Asian Championships.

== Career ==
Yasir made his international debut at the 2016 Asian Junior Championships in Ho Chi Minh City, where he finished sixth with a throw of 67.02 m.

At the 2017 Islamic Solidarity Games in Baku, he finished eighth with a throw of 65.20 m. Later at the Universiade in Taipei, he finished 22nd among 27 athletes in the qualification round with a throw of 66.79 m and did not advance into the final.

He won the gold medal at the 2022 Imam Reza Cup in Mashhad with a 74.83 m throw.

In 2023, he won the bronze medal at the Asian Championships in Bangkok with a personal best of 79.93 m. In October, he narrowly missed the podium with a fourth-place finish at the Asian Games in Hangzhou with a throw of 78.13 m. Later the same month, he finished fourth at the Asian Throwing Championships in Mokpo, with a throw of 72.64 m.

He won the silver medal with a throw of 78.10 m at the 2024 Asian Throwing Championships in Mokpo.

In 2025, he finished eighth at the Asian Championships in Gumi with a throw of 75.39 m. He also won the bronze medal at the 2025 Asian Throwing Championships in Mokpo, with a season-best throw of 77.43 m. At the 2025 Islamic Solidarity Games in Riyadh, he won the silver medal with a throw of 76.04 m.

At the 2026 Commonwealth Games in Glasgow, he failed to qualify for the final after producing a season-best effort of 74.36 m on his final attempt in the qualification round to finish 14th overall. At the 2026 Asian Games in Nagoya, he finished ninth in the men's javelin final with a best throw of 73.50 m, ending his season without a podium finish. In October 2026, he claimed the javelin gold at the 54th National Athletics Championships in Karachi after Arshad Nadeem withdrew from the event.

== International competitions ==
Representing Pakistan
Year	Competition	Venue	Position	Notes
2016	Asian Junior Championships	Ho Chi Minh City, Vietnam	6th	67.02 m
2017	Islamic Solidarity Games	Baku, Azerbaijan	8th	65.20 m
2017	Universiade	(Chinese Taipei) Taipei, Taiwan	22nd (q)	66.79 m
2022	Imam Reza Cup	Mashhad, Iran	1st	74.83 m
2023	Asian Championships	Bangkok, Thailand	3rd	79.93 m PB
2023	Asian Games	Hangzhou, China	4th	78.13 m
2023	Asian Throwing Championships	Mokpo, South Korea	4th	72.64 m
2024	Asian Throwing Championships	Mokpo, South Korea	2nd	78.10 m
2025	Asian Championships	Gumi, South Korea	8th	75.39 m
2025	Asian Throwing Championships	Mokpo, South Korea	3rd	77.43 m SB
2025	Islamic Solidarity Games	Riyadh, Saudi Arabia	2nd	76.04 m
2026	Commonwealth Games	Glasgow, Scotland	14th (q)	74.36 m SB
2026	Asian Games	Nagoya, Japan	9th	73.50 m

== See also ==
- Athletics in Pakistan
