= 2010 World Junior Championships in Athletics – Men's javelin throw =

The men's javelin throw event at the 2010 World Junior Championships in Athletics was held in Moncton, New Brunswick, Canada, at Moncton Stadium on 22 and 23 July.

== Medalists ==
Gold	Till Wöschler; Germany
Silver	Genki Dean; Japan
Bronze	Dmitri Tarabin; Russia

== Results ==
=== Final ===
23 July

Rank	Name	Nationality	Attempts						Result	Notes
Rank	Name	Nationality	1	2	3	4	5	6	Result	Notes
1st place, gold medalist(s)	Till Wöschler	Germany	82.52	-	76.05	74.99	-	76.08	82.52	
2nd place, silver medalist(s)	Genki Dean	Japan	68.68	73.16	71.80	76.44	x	72.63	76.44	
3rd place, bronze medalist(s)	Dmitri Tarabin	Russia	68.23	76.42	x	73.07	x	70.75	76.42	
4	Lars Timmerman	Netherlands	70.63	72.56	70.19	75.66	x	68.26	75.66	
5	Joseph Zimmerman	United States	66.61	71.23	73.14	69.05	74.64	67.45	74.64	
6	Rocco van Rooyen	South Africa	x	74.13	x	x	x	68.38	74.13	
7	Zigismunds Sirmais	Latvia	73.38	x	70.99	66.17	72.92	64.40	73.38	
8	Cheng Chao-Tsun	Chinese Taipei	x	71.45	71.58	65.90	69.86	68.92	71.58	
9	Thomas Röhler	Germany	69.93	x	69.25				69.93	
10	Caleb Jones	Canada	68.35	69.77	69.27				69.77	
11	Daniel Pembroke	United Kingdom	63.13	68.12	66.83				68.12	
12	Raymond Dykstra	Canada	59.96	63.80	58.75				63.80	

=== Qualifications ===
22 July

==== Group A ====
Rank	Name	Nationality	Attempts			Result	Notes
Rank	Name	Nationality	1	2	3	Result	Notes
1	Zigismunds Sirmais	Latvia	x	77.97	-	77.97	Q
2	Till Wöschler	Germany	72.78	-	-	72.78	Q
3	Genki Dean	Japan	x	69.44	72.20	72.20	Q
4	Raymond Dykstra	Canada	64.44	63.24	70.18	70.18	q
5	Rocco van Rooyen	South Africa	69.74	x	x	69.74	q
6	Lars Timmerman	Netherlands	x	65.22	69.29	69.29	q
7	Ahmed Samir Mohamed	Egypt	66.88	x	60.10	66.88	
8	Jaka Muhar	Slovenia	64.32	x	x	64.32	
9	Branko Paukovic	Serbia	59.34	63.75	x	63.75	
10	Arnolds Strenga	Latvia	61.81	x	x	61.81	
11	José Escobar	Ecuador	x	61.63	61.72	61.72	
12	Strydom van der Wath	Namibia	57.36	61.66	x	61.66	
13	Derek Eager	United States	55.97	57.78	60.47	60.47	
14	Joel Karjalainen	Finland	60.27	58.99	59.51	60.27	
15	Marcin Krukowski	Poland	59.24	x	x	59.24	
16	Petter Ormsettrø	Norway	58.24	x	58.46	58.46	
	Huang Shih-Feng	Chinese Taipei	x	x	x	NM	

==== Group B ====
Rank	Name	Nationality	Attempts			Result	Notes
Rank	Name	Nationality	1	2	3	Result	Notes
1	Dmitri Tarabin	Russia	x	69.01	71.06	71.06	q
2	Thomas Röhler	Germany	65.56	69.95	71.05	71.05	q
3	Joseph Zimmerman	United States	70.12	68.67	-	70.12	q
4	Daniel Pembroke	United Kingdom	x	66.69	69.44	69.44	q
5	Caleb Jones	Canada	69.36	67.86	67.40	69.36	q
6	Cheng Chao-Tsun	Chinese Taipei	x	64.80	67.89	67.89	q
7	Dean Goosen	South Africa	66.26	62.61	65.93	66.26	
8	Kenji Maritani	Japan	64.37	62.44	66.15	66.15	
9	Keshorn Walcott	Trinidad and Tobago	x	65.21	66.05	66.05	
10	Rustem Dremdzhy	Ukraine	65.34	x	60.02	65.34	
11	Borja Barbeito	Spain	63.79	x	58.99	63.79	
12	Killian Durechou	France	60.06	61.90	x	61.90	
13	Rainer Manninen	Finland	59.15	x	x	59.15	
14	Nerijus Luckauskas	Lithuania	x	x	57.81	57.81	
15	Tiago Aperta	Portugal	x	x	56.10	56.10	
	Tomás Guerra	Chile	x	x	x	NM	

== Participation ==
According to an unofficial count, 33 athletes from 25 countries participated in the event.

- Canada (2)
- Chile (1)
- Chinese Taipei (2)
- Ecuador (1)
- Egypt (1)
- Finland (2)
- France (1)
- Germany (2)
- Japan (2)
- Latvia (2)
- Lithuania (1)
- Namibia (1)
- Netherlands (1)
- Norway (1)
- Poland (1)
- Portugal (1)
- Russia (1)
- Serbia (1)
- Slovenia (1)
- South Africa (2)
- Spain (1)
- Trinidad and Tobago (1)
- Ukraine (1)
- United Kingdom (1)
- United States (2)
