= Athletics at the 2017 Summer Universiade – Men's javelin throw =

The men's javelin throw event at the 2017 Summer Universiade was held on 24 and 26 August at the Taipei Municipal Stadium.

== Medalists ==
Gold	Silver	Bronze
Cheng Chao-tsun; Chinese Taipei	Andreas Hofmann; Germany	Huang Shih-feng; Chinese Taipei

== Results ==
=== Qualification ===
Qualification: 76.00 m (Q) or at least 12 best (q) qualified for the final.

Rank	Group	Athlete	Nationality	#1	#2	#3	Result	Notes
1	B	Andreas Hofmann	Germany	83.51			83.51	Q
2	A	Cheng Chao-tsun	Chinese Taipei	81.54			81.54	Q
3	B	Huang Shih-feng	Chinese Taipei	72.77	74.48	77.78	77.78	Q
4	A	Andrian Mardare	Moldova	77.69			77.69	Q
5	A	Marcin Krukowski	Poland	x	72.01	77.28	77.28	Q
6	A	Kenji Ogura	Japan	74.95	73.81	76.13	76.13	Q
7	B	Norbert Rivasz-Tóth	Hungary	73.71	75.75	–	75.75	q
8	B	Ben Langton Burnell	New Zealand	69.75	73.02	75.58	75.58	q
9	A	Skirmantas Šimoliūnas	Lithuania	75.28	70.87	x	75.28	q
10	B	William White	Australia	74.16	72.81	73.18	74.16	q
11	A	Liam O'Brien	Australia	74.14	66.95	x	74.14	q
12	B	Sumeda Ranasinghe	Sri Lanka	70.32	68.12	72.25	72.25	q
13	A	Emin Öncel	Turkey	71.65	68.22	x	71.65	
14	A	Lars Timmerman	Netherlands	70.60	71.01	68.71	71.01	
15	B	Johannes Grobler	South Africa	70.92	70.31	65.62	70.92	
16	A	Jānis Grīva	Latvia	69.37	66.23	70.75	70.75	
17	A	Vedran Samac	Serbia	70.71	66.82	66.32	70.71	
18	B	Edis Matusevičius	Lithuania	70.61	r		70.61	
19	B	Takuto Kominami	Japan	70.61	r		70.43	
20	A	Sami Peltomäki	Finland	68.45	68.50	69.55	69.55	
21	A	Bae Yu-il	South Korea	62.28	x	67.57	67.57	
22	B	Muhammad Yasir	Pakistan	66.79	66.60	64.04	66.79	
23	B	Hubert Chmielak	Poland	64.28	66.50	x	66.50	
24	B	John Krzyszkowski	Canada	65.10	61.39	x	65.10	
25	A	Evan Karakolis	Canada	62.98	x	60.91	62.98	
26	B	Robert Okello	Uganda	56.18	x	53.10	56.18	
	B	Karrar Raad Al-Yasari	Iraq				DNS	

=== Final ===
Rank	Name	Nationality	#1	#2	#3	#4	#5	#6	Result	Notes
1st place, gold medalist(s)	Cheng Chao-tsun	Chinese Taipei	83.91	82.45	x	84.37	x	91.36	91.36	UR, AR
2nd place, silver medalist(s)	Andreas Hofmann	Germany	83.00	x	85.59	85.97	88.33	91.07	91.07	PB
3rd place, bronze medalist(s)	Huang Shih-feng	Chinese Taipei	81.34	x	81.96	86.64	–	x	86.64	PB
4	Andrian Mardare	Moldova	77.20	x	76.91	80.63	x	79.59	80.63	
5	Marcin Krukowski	Poland	78.37	79.38	78.59	78.75	x	79.37	79.38	
6	Norbert Rivasz-Tóth	Hungary	77.23	73.64	72.41	78.42	75.79	74.84	78.42	
7	William White	Australia	77.74	76.52	x	73.74	x	x	77.74	PB
8	Ben Langton Burnell	New Zealand	75.93	71.88	x	67.26	73.93	70.98	75.93	
9	Kenji Ogura	Japan	72.03	x	74.82				74.82	
10	Skirmantas Šimoliūnas	Lithuania	62.84	74.27	70.47				74.27	
11	Liam O'Brien	Australia	65.19	68.83	69.80				69.80	
12	Sumeda Ranasinghe	Sri Lanka	69.65	x	x				69.65	
