= Athletics at the 2015 Summer Universiade – Men's javelin throw =

The men's javelin throw event at the 2015 Summer Universiade was held on 8 and 10 July at the Gwangju Universiade Main Stadium.

== Medalists ==
Gold	Silver	Bronze
Tanel Laanmäe; Estonia	Huang Shih-Feng; Chinese Taipei	Zigismunds Sirmais; Latvia

== Results ==
=== Qualification ===
Qualification: 76.00 m (Q) or at least 12 best (q) qualified for the final.

Rank	Group	Athlete	Nationality	#1	#2	#3	Result	Notes
1	A	Sami Peltomaeki	Finland	x	77.63		77.63	Q
2	A	Huang Shih-Feng	Chinese Taipei	76.96			76.96	Q
3	A	Tanel Laanmäe	Estonia	76.10			76.10	Q
4	B	Cheng Chao-Tsun	Chinese Taipei	75.69	74.64	75.94	75.94	q
5	B	Hubert Chmielak	Poland	69.38	75.70	x	75.70	q
6	B	Ben Langton Burnell	New Zealand	74.28	x	75.54	75.54	q, PB
7	A	Vedran Samac	Serbia	71.47	75.51	73.95	75.51	q
8	A	Dejan Mileusnić	Bosnia and Herzegovina	75.06	–	–	75.06	q
9	A	Zigismunds Sirmais	Latvia	74.94	73.38	70.21	74.94	q
10	B	Magnus Kirt	Estonia	73.06	73.23	74.16	74.16	q
11	B	Jiannis Smalios	Sweden	72.19	73.23	x	73.23	q
12	A	Oleksandr Nychyporchuk	Ukraine	72.83	72.79	x	72.83	q
13	A	Homare Mori	Japan	65.26	64.75	71.19	71.19	
14	B	Antonio Fent	Italy	68.81	x	70.20	70.20	
15	A	Kim Ye-ram	South Korea	x	62.82	70.19	70.19	
16	B	Bobur Shokirjonov	Uzbekistan	69.69	69.37	69.78	69.78	
17	B	Andrey Tabala	Russia	x	67.35	69.72	69.72	
18	B	Altaf Hussain Shah	Pakistan	63.92	66.28	69.38	69.38	PB
19	B	Chad Herman	South Africa	x	65.09	69.03	69.03	
20	A	Ranasinghe Mudiyanselage	Sri Lanka	68.82	68.90	67.40	68.90	
21	B	Andrew White	Canada	65.38	68.09	68.57	68.57	SB
22	A	Aleksandr Kharitonov	Russia	x	62.76	66.83	66.83	
23	B	Derek Eager	United States	64.88	63.05	62.89	64.88	
24	A	David Kastrevc	Slovenia	58.83	61.14	61.52	61.52	SB
25	A	Yousef Al-Momani	Jordan	47.26	45.42	x	47.26	
27	B	Nidal El Hasrouni	Lebanon	x	31.08	36.07	36.07	
	A	Tomas Guerra	Chile	x	x	x	NM	

=== Final ===
Official Video

Rank	Athlete	Nationality	#1	#2	#3	#4	#5	#6	Result	Notes
1st place, gold medalist(s)	Tanel Laanmäe	Estonia	81.71	77.66	74.57	75.71	74.98	77.41	81.71	
2nd place, silver medalist(s)	Huang Shih-Feng	Chinese Taipei	75.03	81.27	x	79.05	77.65	x	81.27	
3rd place, bronze medalist(s)	Zigismunds Sirmais	Latvia	79.37	75.45	76.95	76.00	67.75	74.88	79.37	SB
4	Cheng Chao-Tsun	Chinese Taipei	74.56	x	76.45	79.35	79.14	76.02	79.35	
5	Vedran Samac	Serbia	x	75.97	78.57	x	78.96	78.43	78.96	
6	Hubert Chmielak	Poland	74.25	78.96	73.60	x	x	76.34	78.96	
7	Sami Peltomaeki	Finland	74.80	76.66	77.34	x	77.72	76.71	77.72	SB
8	Magnus Kirt	Estonia	73.98	75.30	76.65	75.58	75.37	x	76.65	
9	Dejan Mileusnić	Bosnia and Herzegovina	70.85	69.46	75.37				75.37	
10	Ben Langton Burnell	New Zealand	74.39	x	x				74.39	
11	Oleksandr Nychyporchuk	Ukraine	74.30	73.30	x				74.30	
12	Jiannis Smalios	Sweden	73.77	71.85	x				73.77	
