= Kishore Jena =

Indian athlete (born 1995)

Kishore Jena OLY
Personal information
- Full name: Kishore Kumar Jena
- Born: 6 September 1995 (age 30) Brahmagiri, Odisha, India
- Employer: Central Industrial Security Force
- Height: 1.76 m (5 ft 9 in)

Sport
- Sport: Track and Field
- Event: Javelin throw

Achievements and titles
- Personal best: 87.54 m (2023)
Medal record
Men's javelin throw
Representing India
Asian Games
Silver medal – second place	2022 Hangzhou	Javelin throw

Kishore Kumar Jena (born 6 September 1995) is an Indian javelin thrower. He rose to prominence after winning the silver medal in the men's javelin event at the 2022 Asian Games. Jena represented India at the 2024 Paris Olympics, competing in the men's javelin event.

== Early life ==
He was born to Keshab and Harapriya Jena who are paddy farmers and hails from the Kothasahi village in the Puri district of Odisha. Before pursuing javelin as a sport, Jena was a volleyball player who quit the sport due to his short stature and rejection from a sports hostel. He is employed at Central Industrial Security Force (CISF) at Bhopal since 2018.

== Career ==
In June 2023, Jena, won silver in the national championships in Bhubaneshwar. On 30 July 2023, Jena registered his second best throw in Diyagama, Sri Lanka, with a distance of 84.38m.

He registered his then personal best throw of 84.77m in the Javelin Throw Final and finished 5th at the 2023 World Athletics Championships in Budapest in August 2023 overcoming early difficulties in obtaining visa approval from authorities.

On 4 October 2023, he won the silver medal at the 2022 Asian Games in Hangzhou, with a personal record throw of 87.54m.

He competed in the javelin at the 2024 Summer Olympics in Paris in August 2024.

He finished eighth in May 2025 at the 2025 Doha Diamond League.
