= D. P. Manu =

Indian athlete

Personal information
- Nationality: Indian
- Born: Devarakeshavi Prakasha Manu; 24 January 2000 (age 26) Belur, Karnataka, India
- Height: 1.87 m (6 ft 2 in)
- Weight: 86 kg (190 lb)

Sport
- Sport: Athletics
- Event: Javelin throw

Achievements and titles
- Personal best: 84.35 m (2022)
Medal record
Men's athletics
Representing India
Asian Athletics Championships
Silver medal – second place	2023 Bangkok	Javelin

Devarakeshavi Prakasha Manu (born 24 January 2000) is an Indian track and field athlete who competes in the javelin throw.

Manu is currently serving a four-year competition ban set to expire in June 2028 for an anit-doping rule violation.

== Career ==
From Hassan, Manu was trained from 2020 in Pune by Kashinath Naik. In June 2022, Manu threw a personal best of 84.35m to win the Inter-State championships in Chennai. This distance made him the fourth best Indian javelin thrower of all time. He won the Indian national championships in June 2022.

Manu finished fifth in the javelin at the 2022 Commonwealth Games in Birmingham. Overall in 2022, he threw further than 80 metres in five out of his nine competitions.

In July 2023, he threw over 81 metres to win silver at the Asian Athletics Championships in Bangkok. He was selected for the 2023 World Athletics Championships in Budapest in August 2023. He qualified for the final with an 81.31m throw, then threw 84.14m to place 6th.

In March 2025, Manu was issued with a four-year ban backdated to June 2024 by the Indian National Anti-Doping Agency for an anti-doping rule violation after testing for a prohibited substance. The name of the substance was not publicly disclosed.
