= Ma Qun (athlete) =

Chinese javelin thrower (born 1994)

Personal information
- Born: 8 February 1994 (age 31)

Sport
- Sport: Athletics
- Event: Javelin throw

Ma Qun (born 8 February 1994) is a Chinese athlete specialising in the javelin throw. He won a bronze medal at the 2019 Summer Universiade.

His personal best in the event is 82.46 metres set in Guiyang in 2018.

== International competitions ==
| Year | Competition | Venue | Position | Event | Notes |
Representing China
| 2015 | Asian Championships | Wuhan, China | 6th | Javelin throw | 74.84 m |
| 2018 | Asian Games | Jakarta, Indonesia | 4th | Javelin throw | 80.46 m |
| 2019 | Asian Championships | Doha, Qatar | 7th | Javelin throw | 76.31 m |
| 2019 | Universiade | Naples, Italy | 3rd | Javelin throw | 79.62 m |
