= 2017 Asian Athletics Championships – Men's javelin throw =

The men's javelin throw at the 2017 Asian Athletics Championships was held on 9 July.

== Results ==
Rank	Name	Nationality	#1	#2	#3	#4	#5	#6	Result	Notes
1st place, gold medalist(s)	Neeraj Chopra	India	x	78.59	78.54	83.06	80.99	85.23	85.23	CR
2nd place, silver medalist(s)	Ahmed Bader Magour	Qatar	78.67	81.53	77.95	83.70	x	80.28	83.70	
3rd place, bronze medalist(s)	Davinder Singh Kang	India	75.72	81.56	79.57	83.29	78.94	80.29	83.29	
4	Huang Shih-feng	Chinese Taipei	78.01	81.27	78.62	x	79.94	77.00	81.27	
5	Liu Qizhen	China	77.90	78.18	79.33	80.12	78.25	79.07	80.12	
6	Cheng Chao-tsun	Chinese Taipei	78.76	78.67	79.56	77.83	x	80.03	80.03	
7	Arshad Nadeem	Pakistan	73.90	77.39	73.93	78.00	74.89	76.69	78.00	
8	Waruna Lakshan Dayarathna	Sri Lanka	76.78	x	x	67.20	74.08	65.68	76.78	
9	Bobur Shokirjonov	Uzbekistan	x	75.34	x				75.34	
10	Li Yingchang	China	74.76	73.27	x				74.76	
11	Vladislav Palyunin	Uzbekistan	70.60	x	69.39				70.60	
12	Bae Yu-il	South Korea	x	69.87	x				69.87	
13	Ali Abdelghani Issa	Saudi Arabia	62.48	62.94	69.53				69.53	
14	Abhishek Singh	India	68.22	x	67.18				68.22	
15	Artur Gafner	Kazakhstan	63.59	x	61.55				63.59	
16	Hui Wai Hei Ricky	Hong Kong	61.80	60.57	62.99				62.99	
17	Abdullah Mohammed Al-Ghamdi	Saudi Arabia	60.45	58.80	61.23				61.23	
18	Sazzad Md Hossain	Bangladesh	52.92	51.66	x				52.92	

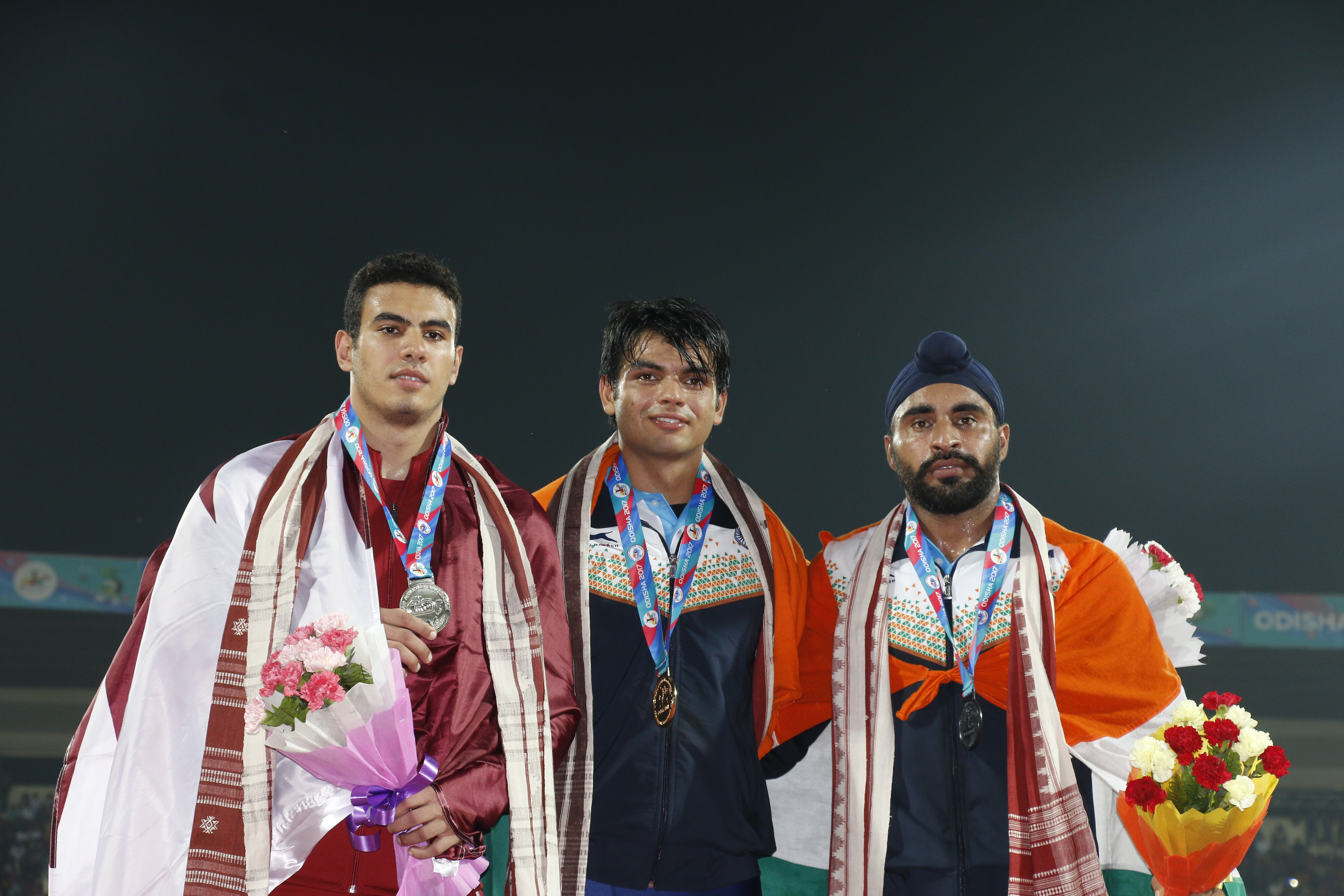
The three medallists
