= Genki Dean =

Japanese javelin thrower (born 1991)

Roderick Genki Dean
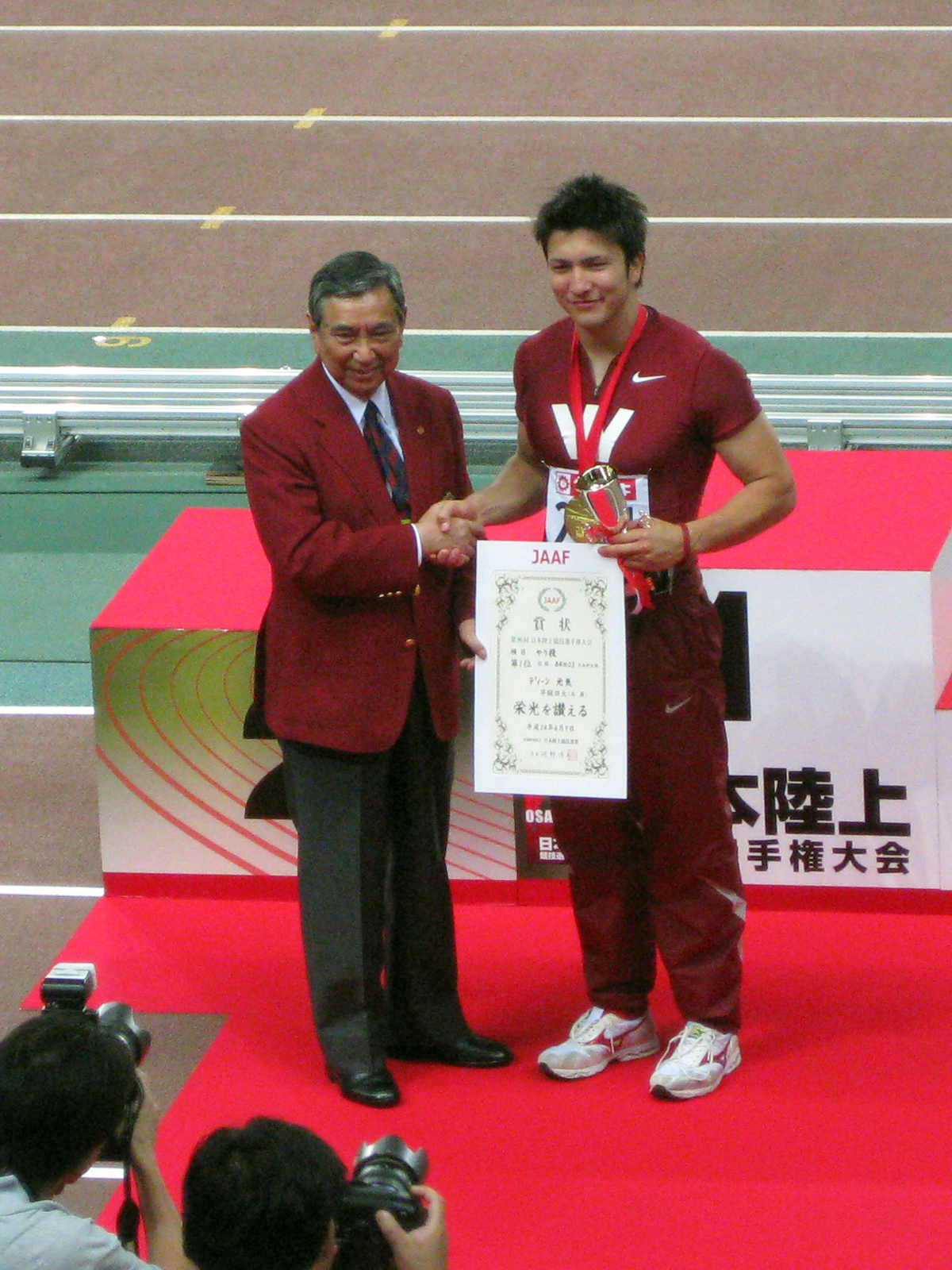
- Dean at the 2012 Japan Championships

Personal information
- Nationality: Japanese
- Born: 30 December 1991 (age 34) Kobe, Japan
- Height: 1.82 m (6 ft 0 in)

Sport
- Sport: Track and field
- Event: Javelin throw
- College team: Waseda University

Achievements and titles
- Personal best: 84.66 m (2025)
Medal record
Men's athletics
Representing Japan
Asian Games
| Bronze medal – third place | 2022 Hangzhou | Javelin throw |
Asian Championships
| Gold medal – first place | 2023 Bangkok | Javelin throw |
World U20 Championships
| Silver medal – second place | 2010 Moncton | Javelin throw |

Roderick Genki Dean (Japanese: ディーン・ロドリック・元気; born 30 December 1991) is a Japanese athlete who competes in the javelin throw. He was born to a Japanese mother and a British father from Chester-le-Street, England. He has a degree in sports science from Waseda University.

== Career ==
He started throwing the javelin at age 15 in high school and immediately displayed an aptitude for the discipline. He won a silver medal at the 2010 World Junior Championships in Athletics throwing a new personal best of 76.44 m. He first came to prominence at the 2012 Japan Championships in Athletics, throwing 84.03 m, setting a new championship record, beating veteran Yukifumi Murakami and sealing his place in the Japanese team for the 2012 Summer Olympics in the Javelin throw. He was selected as the Most Valuable Male Athlete of the Japanese Championships. At the 2012 Olympics he threw 82.07m to qualify from the heats, but could not improve on this and finished 10th in the final with 79.95m.

In 2020 and 2021, he finished 2nd in the Japanese championships.

Dean won Japan's National Javelin Championship and earned gold medals in June 2022 and 2023, with 81.02 m and 82.65 m throws. In 2023, he won the Asian Championships, finished third in the Asian Games and competed at the World Championships, having also competed at the 2022 World Championships.

He competed at the 2025 World Athletics Championships in Tokyo, Japan, throwing 77.01 metres without advancing to the final.

== Seasonal bests by year ==
- 2009 - 70.57 m
- 2010 - 78.57 m
- 2011 - 79.20 m
- 2012 - 84.28 m
- 2013 - 80.15 m
- 2014 - 77.32 m
- 2015 - 75.09 m
- 2016 - 79.59 m
- 2017 - 75.30 m
- 2018 - 76.33 m
- 2019 - 78.00 m
- 2020 - 84.05 m
- 2021 - 82.15 m
- 2022 - 82.34 m
- 2023 - 83.15 m
- 2024 - 83.19 m
- 2025 - 84.66 m
