= Stipe Žunić =

Croatian shot putter

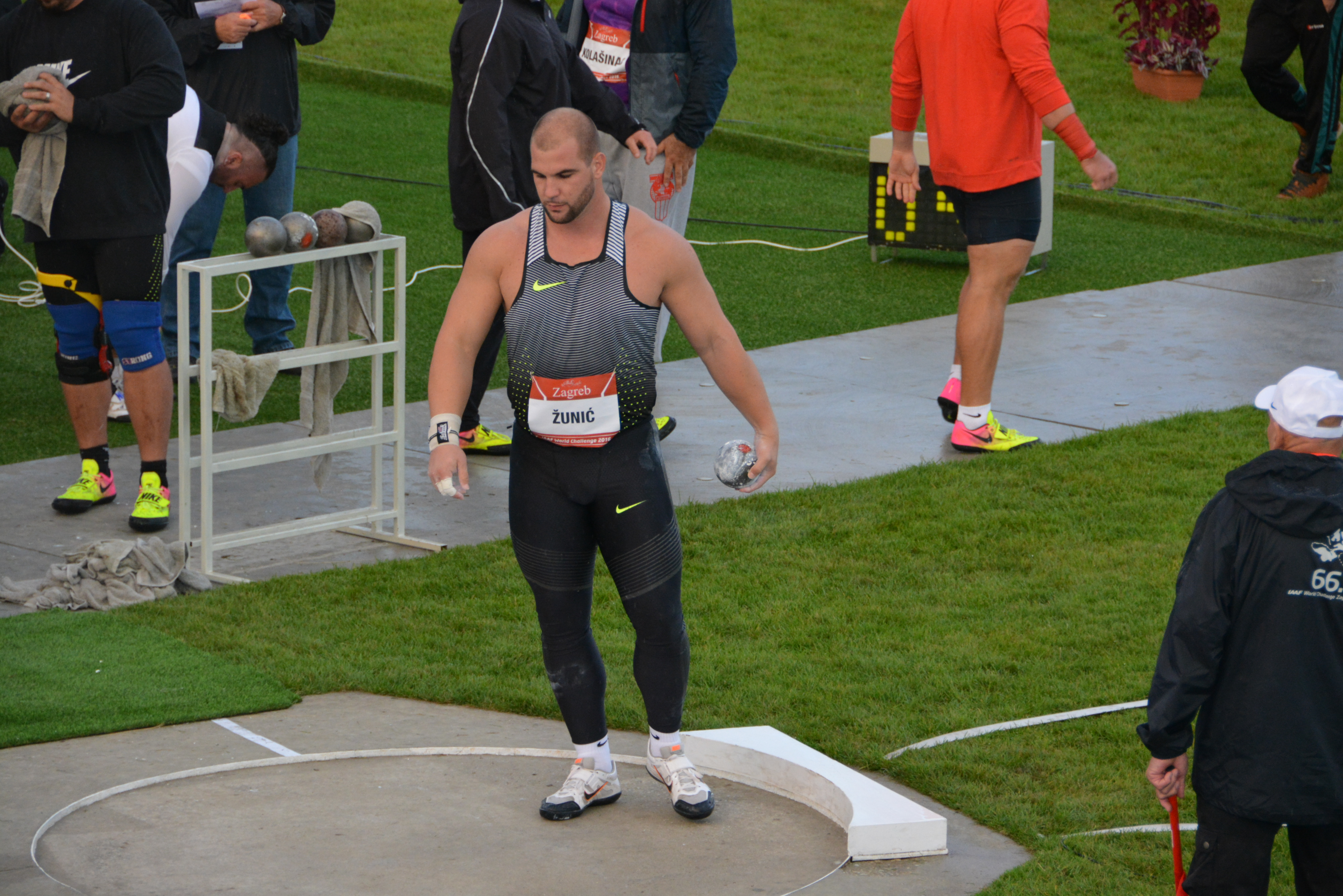

Personal information
- Nationality: Croatian
- Born: 13 December 1990 (age 35)
- Height: 1.93 m (6 ft 4 in)
- Weight: 130 kg (287 lb)

Sport
- Sport: Track and field
- Event: Shot put
- College team: University of Florida
- Coached by: Marko Mastelić

Achievements and titles
- Highest world ranking: 11th (2018)
Medal record
Men's athletics
Representing Croatia
World Championships
Bronze medal – third place	2017 London	Shot put
Mediterranean Games
Silver medal – second place	2018 Tarragona	Shot Put

Stipe Žunić (born 13 December 1990) is a Croatian athlete specialising in the shot put, having switched from the javelin throw in 2013. He finished third at the 2017 World Championships in Athletics, fourth at the 2014 European Athletics Championships and seventh at the 2015 European Athletics Indoor Championships.

Before switching to athletics in 2008, he competed in kick-boxing. He is a former World Junior Champion in that discipline, winning 65 out of his 70 fights. Žunić took up javelin throw, but suffered a major injury. After elbow surgery in 2013, Žunić switched to shot put.

He studied sociology at the University of Florida in Gainesville.

== Competition record ==
Year	Competition	Venue	Position	Event	Notes
Representing Croatia
2007	World Youth Championships	Ostrava, Czech Republic	29th (q)	Shot put (5 kg)	17.12 m
2007	World Youth Championships	Ostrava, Czech Republic	7th	Javelin throw (700g)	70.25 m
2007	European Youth Olympic Festival	Belgrade, Serbia	3rd	Javelin throw (700g)	70.98 m
2008	World Junior Championships	Bydgoszcz, Poland	18th (q)	Javelin throw	62.44 m
2011	European U23 Championships	Ostrava, Czech Republic	11th	Javelin throw	69.53 m
2014	European Championships	Zürich, Switzerland	4th	Shot put	20.68 m
2015	European Indoor Championships	Prague, Czech Republic	7th	Shot put	20.28 m
2016	European Championships	Amsterdam, Netherlands	8th	Shot put	19.95 m
2016	Olympic Games	Rio de Janeiro, Brazil	11th	Shot put	20.04 m
2017	European Indoor Championships	Belgrade, Serbia	5th	Shot put	21.04 m
2017	World Championships	London, United Kingdom	3rd	Shot put	21.46 m
2018	Mediterranean Games	Tarragona, Spain	2nd	Shot put	20.21 m
2018	European Championships	Berlin, Germany	7th	Shot put	20.73 m

== Personal bests ==
Outdoor

- Shot put – 21.48 (Slovenska Bistrica 2017) NR
- Discus throw – 59.09 (Mississippi 2015)
- Javelin throw – 77.89 (Austin 2012)

Indoor

- Shot put – 21.11 (Fayetteville 2015)

== Acknowledgements ==
- City of Zadar Award (2017)
