= Ryohei Arai (javelin thrower) =

Japanese javelin thrower (born 1991)

Ryōhei Arai
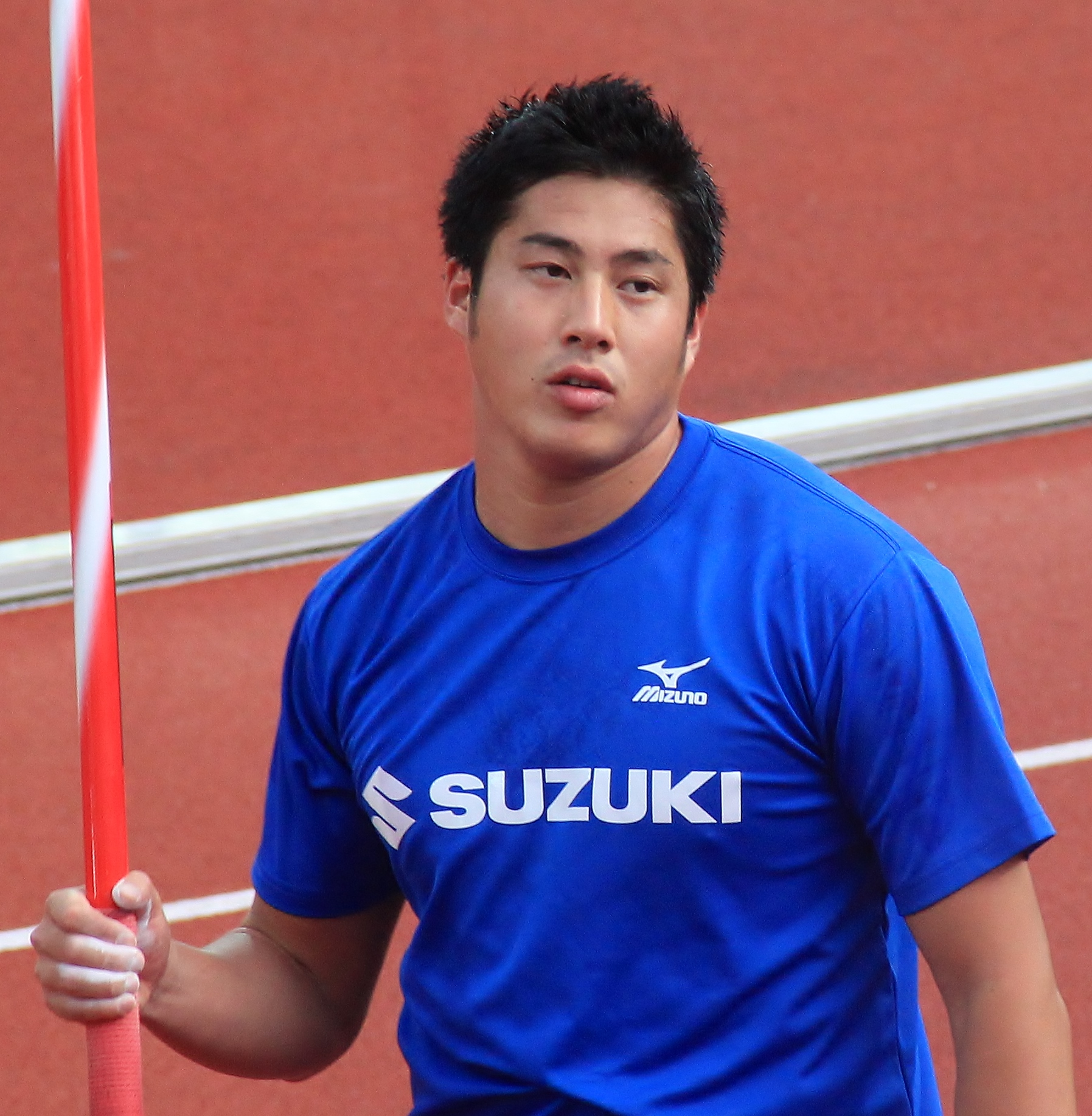
- Arai at 2016 Bislett Games

Personal information
- Born: 23 June 1991 (age 35) Saitama Prefecture
- Education: Kokushikan University
- Height: 1.83 m (6 ft 0 in)
- Weight: 90 kg (200 lb)

Sport
- Sport: Track and field
- Event: Javelin throw
- Club: Suzuki Hamatsu AC
- Coached by: Yoshinari Kuriyama
Medal record
Representing Japan
Men's athletics
Asian Games
Silver medal – second place	2014 Incheon	javelin throw
Asian Championships
Bronze medal – third place	2019 Doha	javelin throw

Ryōhei Arai (新井涼平, Arai Ryōhei; born 23 June 1991) is a Japanese athlete specialising in the javelin throw. He represented his country at the 2015 World Championships finishing ninth. In addition, he won the silver at the 2014 Asian Games.

His personal best in the event is 86.83 metres set in Isahaya in 2014.

== Competition record ==
Year	Competition	Venue	Position	Event	Notes
Representing Japan
2013	Universiade	Kazan, Russia	8th	Javelin throw	75.53 m
2014	Asian Games	Incheon, South Korea	2nd	Javelin throw	84.42 m
2015	World Championships	Beijing, China	9th	Javelin throw	83.07 m
2016	Olympic Games	Rio de Janeiro, Brazil	11th	Javelin throw	79.47 m
2017	World Championships	London, United Kingdom	23rd (q)	Javelin throw	77.38 m
2018	Asian Games	Jakarta, Indonesia	7th	Javelin throw	75.24 m
2019	Asian Championships	Doha, Qatar	3rd	Javelin throw	81.93 m
2019	World Championships	Doha, Qatar	15th (q)	Javelin throw	81.71 m
2023	Asian Championships	Bangkok, Thailand	5th	Javelin throw	72.43 m
2025	Asian Championships	Gumi, South Korea	9th	Javelin throw	74.21 m

== Seasonal bests by year ==
- 2011 – 78.21
- 2012 – 78.00
- 2013 – 78.19
- 2014 – 86.83
- 2015 – 84.66
- 2016 – 84.54
- 2017 – 82.13
- 2018 – 80.83
- 2019 – 82.03
- 2020 – 81.73
- 2021 – 79.20
- 2022 – 82.99
- 2023 – 82.21
- 2024 – 83.37
