= Athletics at the 2018 Asian Games – Men's javelin throw =

Men's javelin throw at the 2018 Asian Games
- Venue: Gelora Bung Karno Stadium
- Date: 27 August 2018
- Competitors: 13 from 9 nations

Medalists
gold medal	Neeraj Chopra	India
silver medal	Liu Qizhen	China
bronze medal	Arshad Nadeem	Pakistan

The men's javelin throw competition at the 2018 Asian Games took place on 27 August 2018 at the Gelora Bung Karno Stadium.

== Schedule ==
All times are Western Indonesia Time (UTC+07:00)

Date	Time	Event
Monday, 27 August 2018	18:45	Final

== Records ==
Prior to this competition, the existing world, Asian and Games records were as follows.

World Record	Jan Železný (CZE)	98.48	Jena, Germany	25 May 1996
Asian Record	Cheng Chao-tsun (TPE)	91.36	Taipei, Taiwan	26 August 2017
Games Record	Zhao Qinggang (CHN)	89.15	Incheon, South Korea	2 October 2014

== Results ==
Rank	Athlete	Attempt						Result	Notes
Rank	Athlete	1	2	3	4	5	6	Result	Notes
1st place, gold medalist(s)	Neeraj Chopra (IND)	83.46	X	88.06	83.25	86.36	X	88.06	
2nd place, silver medalist(s)	Liu Qizhen (CHN)	82.22	78.58	81.43	75.69	75.51	71.04	82.22	
3rd place, bronze medalist(s)	Arshad Nadeem (PAK)	73.52	76.73	72.20	80.75	77.56	72.22	80.75	
4	Ma Qun (CHN)	78.03	76.44	80.46	79.31	77.98	X	80.46	
5	Cheng Chao-tsun (TPE)	79.81	75.61	X	79.62	X	X	79.81	
6	Ahmed Bader Magour (QAT)	75.49	X	75.51	75.78	78.23	X	78.23	
7	Ryohei Arai (JPN)	73.71	74.71	75.24	X	X	X	75.24	
8	Shivpal Singh (IND)	74.11	—	—	—	—	X	74.11	
9	Huang Shih-feng (TPE)	73.28	X	73.86				73.86	
10	Peerachet Jantra (THA)	72.85	70.10	70.46				72.85	
11	Ricky Hui (HKG)	71.78	62.76	64.65				71.78	
12	Abd Hafiz (INA)	66.93	67.47	66.18				67.47	
13	Mohamed Ibrahim Kaida (QAT)	X	X	60.13				60.13	
