= Vedran Samac =

Serbian javelin thrower

Personal information
- Born: 22 January 1990 (age 36) Sremska Mitrovica, SR Serbia, SFR Yugoslavia
- Education: University of Belgrade

Sport
- Sport: Athletics
- Event: Javelin throw

Vedran Samac (born 22 January 1990 in Sremska Mitrovica) is a Serbian athlete specialising in the javelin throw. He represented his country in three European Championships. He also finished fifth at the 2015 Summer Universiade.

His personal best in the event is 81.35 metres set in 2021 European Athletics Team Championships.

== International competitions ==
Year	Competition	Venue	Position	Event	Notes
Representing Serbia
2009	Universiade	Belgrade, Serbia	28th (q)	Javelin throw	63.94 m
2009	European Junior Championships	Novi Sad, Serbia	12th	Javelin throw	66.61 m
2011	European U23 Championships	Ostrava, Czech Republic	16th (q)	Javelin throw	68.12 m
2014	European Championships	Zürich, Switzerland	29th (q)	Javelin throw	69.39 m
2015	Universiade	Gwangju, South Korea	5th	Javelin throw	78.96 m
2016	European Throwing Cup	Arad, Romania	6th	Javelin throw	73.75 m
2016	European Championships	Amsterdam, Netherlands	DNS	Javelin throw	DNS
2017	Universiade	Taipei, Taiwan	17th (q)	Javelin throw	70.71 m
2018	European Championships	Berlin, Germany	18th (q)	Javelin throw	75.89 m
