= Waruna Lakshan =

Sri Lankan javelin thrower

Personal information
- Full name: Rankoth Pedige Waruna Lakshan Dayaratne
- Born: 14 May 1988 (age 38)

Sport
- Sport: Athletics
- Event: Javelin throw
- Club: Sri Lanka Navy Sports Club
- Coached by: Pradeep Nishantha

Rankoth Pedige Waruna Lakshan Dayaratne (born 14 May 1988) is a Sri Lankan athlete specialising in the javelin throw. He represented his country at the 2017 World Championships without qualifying for the final.

His personal best in the event is 82.19 meters, set in Diyagama in 2017.

== International competitions ==
Year	Competition	Venue	Position	Event	Notes
Representing Sri Lanka
2011	Asian Championships	Kobe, Japan	10th	Javelin throw	68.78 m
2015	Asian Championships	Wuhan, China	4th	Javelin throw	76.75 m
2015	Military World Games	Mungyeong, South Korea	8th	Javelin throw	71.79 m
2017	Asian Championships	Bhubaneswar, India	8th	Javelin throw	76.78 m
2017	World Championships	London, United Kingdom	31st (q)	Javelin throw	73.16 m
