= Shivpal Singh =

Indian javelin thrower

Sergeant Shivpal Singh
Personal information
- Nationality: Indian
- Born: 6 July 1995 (age 31) Varanasi, Uttar Pradesh
- Military career
- Allegiance: India
- Branch: Indian Air Force
- Rank: Junior Warrant Officer

Sport
- Country: India
- Sport: Track and field
- Event: Javelin throw
Medal record
Men's athletics
Representing India
Asian Championships
Silver medal – second place	2019 Doha	Javelin throw
South Asian Games
Silver medal – second place	2019 Kathmandu	Javelin throw
Military World Games
Gold medal – first place	2019 Wuhan	Javelin throw

Junior Warrant Officer Shivpal Singh (born 6 July 1995) is an Indian javelin thrower and a Junior Commissioned Officer (JCO) in the Indian Air Force.

He finished eighth at the 2018 Asian Games and won the silver medal at the 2019 Asian Championships.

Shivpal Singh failed to qualify for the men's javelin throw final at IAAF World Championships 2019.

His personal best throw is 86.23 metres, achieved at the 2019 Asian Championships in Doha.

In 2016, Shivpal Singh won the men's javelin throw event at the Budapest Open athletics in Hungary. He finished eighth in the previous edition of the Asian games (2018) as he could only manage one throw off his 3 chances due to an elbow injury. In 2015, he was selected for the junior world championships but was left out of the squad because of the injury.

Shivpal threw the javelin at a distance of 85.47 metres to qualify for the 2020 Olympics.

He was suspended for four years for doping violations, with the suspension running up to 10 October 2025. The ban has been lifted as of Jan 2024.

== Personal life ==
Shivpal Singh is a resident of Hingutargarh village under Dhanapur block of Chandauli district in Uttar Pradesh. His father Ramashray Singh is working in PAC. Shivpal has inherited the sport of javelin throw. His father, uncle Shivpujan Singh and Jagmohan Singh are also javelin throwers.
