= 2023 Asian Athletics Championships – Men's javelin throw =

Men's javelin throw at the 2023 Asian Athletics Championships
- Venue: National Stadium
- Location: Bangkok, Thailand
- Dates: 16 July
- Competitors: 12 from 9 nations
- Winning distance: 83.15 m

Medalists
gold medal	Genki Dean	Japan
silver medal	Devarakeshavi Prakasha Manu	India
bronze medal	Muhammad Yasir	Pakistan

The men's javelin throw event at the 2023 Asian Athletics Championships was held on 16 July.

== Records ==
Records before the 2023 Asian Athletics Championships
Record	Athlete (nation)	Distance (m)	Location	Date
World record	Jan Železný (CZE)	98.48	Jena, East Germany	25 May 1986
Asian record	Cheng Chao-tsun (TPE)	91.36	Taipei, Taiwan	26 August 2017
Championship record	Cheng Chao-tsun (TPE)	86.72	Doha, Qatar	22 April 2019
World leading	Jakub Vadlejch (CZE)	89.51	Turku, Finland	13 June 2023
Asian leading	Neeraj Chopra (IND)	88.67	Doha, Qatar	5 May 2023

== Results ==
Rank	Name	Nationality	#1	#2	#3	#4	#5	#6	Result	Notes
1st place, gold medalist(s)	Genki Dean	Japan	77.30	77.69	81.27	83.15	79.46	x	83.15	
2nd place, silver medalist(s)	Devarakeshavi Prakasha Manu	India	78.22	79.83	x	78.78	75.35	81.01	81.01	
3rd place, bronze medalist(s)	Muhammad Yasir	Pakistan	67.16	x	67.38	73.96	74.90	79.93	79.93	
4	Niu Heqing	China	74.60	75.36	74.33	x	x	x	75.36	
5	Ryohei Arai	Japan	x	x	72.31	x	69.65	72.43	72.43	
6	Artur Gafner	Kazakhstan	69.79	71.89	70.51	71.85	x	68.83	71.89	
7	Cheng Chao-tsun	Chinese Taipei	x	x	66.37	69.54	x	67.30	69.54	
8	Wachirawit Sornwichai	Thailand	64.15	64.08	60.58	x	62.16	62.07	64.15	
9	Watcharakiat Zuesat	Thailand	63.55	x	60.93				63.55	
10	Abdul Hafiz	Indonesia	62.53	x	59.09				62.53	
11	Ricky Hui Wai Hei	Hong Kong	60.03	58.18	57.70				60.03	
12	Kittipong Janduang	Thailand	53.75	54.39	53.86				54.39	
