= Roberto Orlando (athlete) =

Italian javelin thrower

Personal information
- National team: Italy (2 caps)
- Born: 5 August 1995 (age 30) Battipaglia, Italy
- Height: 1.75 m (5 ft 9 in)
- Weight: 80 kg (176 lb)

Sport
- Sport: Athletics
- Event: Javelin throw
- Club: Atletica Virtus Lucca
- Coached by: Elio Cannalonga

Achievements and titles
- Personal best: Javelin throw: 80.35 m (2021)

Roberto Orlando (born 5 August 1995) is an Italian javelin thrower.

== Career ==
His personal best is of 80.35 m set in Rovereto on 26 June 2021. He finished 4th at the 2021 European Athletics Team Championships in Chorzów, and won with his new personal best at the 2021 Italian Championships in Rovereto.

== Achievements ==
Year	Competition	Venue	Rank	Event	Measure	Notes
2019	Universiade	Naples, Italy	9th	Javelin throw	74.76 m	PB
2021	European Team Championships (SL)	Chorzów, Poland	4th	Javelin throw	76.51 m	

== National titles ==
Orlando won two national championships at individual senior level.

- Italian Athletics Championships
  - Javelin throw: 2021
- Italian Winter Throwing Championships
  - Javelin throw: 2021

== See also ==
- Italian all-time lists – Javelin throw
