= Athletics at the 2022 Asian Games – Men's javelin throw =

Men's javelin throw at the 2022 Asian Games
- Venue: Hangzhou Olympic Expo Main Stadium
- Date: 4 October 2023
- Competitors: 14 from 11 nations

Medalists
| gold medal | Neeraj Chopra | India |
| silver medal | Kishore Jena | India |
| bronze medal | Genki Dean | Japan |

The men's javelin throw competition at the 2022 Asian Games took place on 4 October 2023 at the HOC Stadium, Hangzhou.

== Schedule ==
All times are China Standard Time (UTC+08:00)

| Date | Time | Event |
|---|---|---|
| 4 October 2023 | 19:05 | Final |

== Records ==
Prior to this competition, the existing world, Asian and Games records were as follows.

| World Record | Jan Železný (CZE) | 98.48 | Jena, Germany | 25 May 1996 |
| Asian Record | Cheng Chao-tsun (TPE) | 91.36 | Taipei, Taiwan | 26 August 2017 |
| Games Record | Zhao Qinggang (CHN) | 89.15 | Incheon, South Korea | 2 October 2014 |

== Results ==
Legend

- NM — No mark
- r — Retired

| Rank | Athlete | Attempt | | | | | | Result | Notes |
| Rank | Athlete | 1 | 2 | 3 | 4 | 5 | 6 | Result | Notes |
|---|---|---|---|---|---|---|---|---|---|
| 1st place, gold medalist(s) | Neeraj Chopra (IND) | 82.38 | 84.49 | X | 88.88 | 80.80 | X | 88.88 | |
| 2nd place, silver medalist(s) | Kishore Jena (IND) | 81.26 | 79.76 | 86.77 | 87.54 | X | X | 87.54 | |
| 3rd place, bronze medalist(s) | Genki Dean (JPN) | 78.87 | 78.53 | X | 75.50 | 82.68 | 78.67 | 82.68 | |
| 4 | Muhammad Yasir (PAK) | 72.19 | 78.13 | 74.04 | 75.68 | 74.13 | 77.32 | 78.13 | |
| 5 | Kenji Ogura (JPN) | 73.30 | 77.87 | X | 77.35 | 77.37 | X | 77.87 | |
| 6 | Hu Haoran (CHN) | X | 75.41 | 74.58 | 74.42 | X | 71.88 | 75.41 | |
| 7 | Ali Al-Abdulghani (KSA) | 70.56 | 72.27 | 72.75 | 70.46 | 66.85 | 73.45 | 73.45 | |
| 8 | Abdulrahman Al-Azemi (KUW) | 71.41 | X | 68.40 | 66.07 | 63.31 | 70.65 | 71.41 | |
| 9 | Abd Hafiz (INA) | 64.52 | 64.71 | 70.89 | | | | 70.89 | |
| 10 | Cheng Chao-tsun (TPE) | X | X | 67.03 | | | | 67.03 | |
| 11 | Wachirawit Sornwichai (THA) | 63.29 | X | X | | | | 63.29 | |
| 12 | Ricky Hui (HKG) | 58.88 | 58.30 | 62.55 | | | | 62.55 | |
| — | Kim Da-ni (KOR) | X | r | | | | | NM | |
| — | Huang Shih-feng (TPE) | X | X | r | | | | NM | |
