= Tuomas Laaksonen =

Finnish javelin thrower

Personal information
- Born: 9 March 1990 (age 36)

Sport
- Country: Finland
- Sport: Athletics
- Event: Javelin throw

Achievements and titles
- Personal best: Javelin throw: 81.73 m (2013)

Tuomas Laaksonen (born 9 March 1990) is a Finnish male Javelin thrower, who won an individual gold medal at the Youth World Championships.
