= Gen Naganuma =

Japanese athlete (born 1998)

Personal information
- Born: 31 March 1998 (age 28)

Sport
- Sport: Athletics
- Event: Javelin

Achievements and titles
- Personal best(s): Javelin: 80.58 m (Hiroshima, 2025)

Gen Naganuma (born 31 March 1998) is a Japanese javelin thrower.

== Biography ==
He is from Rikuzentakata a city in Iwate Prefecture. He won the Japanese Inter-High School Championship in the javelin throw in 2015 having been coached by his father. He later attended Takada High School and Kokushikan University. He won the men's javelin throw at the Japan Intercollegiate Track and Field Championships in 2019 and represented Japan at the 2019 Summer Universiade in Naples, Italy.

He became a member of Suzuki Athletics Club. He threw a personal best 80.58 metres in Hiroshima in April 2025. He finished third overall at the Japanese Athletics Championships with a throw of 79.84 metres in July 2025.

He finished as runner-up at the Asian Throwing Championships in Mokpo, South Korea in August 2025 with a throw of 78.60 metres. He was selected for the Japanese national team to compete at the 2025 World Athletics Championships in Tokyo, Japan, throwing 74.70 metres without advancing to the final.
