= Cheng Chao-tsun =

Taiwanese javelin thrower

Personal information
- Born: 17 October 1993 (age 33) Yangmei District, Taoyuan, Taiwan
- Education: Fu Jen Catholic University
- Height: 1.77 m (5 ft 10 in)
- Weight: 77 kg (170 lb)

Sport
- Country: Chinese Taipei
- Sport: Track and field
- Event: Javelin throw

Achievements and titles
- Personal best: 91.36 m (2017)

Cheng Chao-tsun (Chinese: 鄭兆村; Hanyu Pinyin: Zhèng Zhàocūn; Tongyong Pinyin: Jhèng Jhào-cun; born 17 October 1993) is a Taiwanese track and field athlete who competes in the javelin throw. His personal best of 91.36 m, set in 2017, was the Asian record until it was broken by Arshad Nadeem at the Paris Olympics in 2024.

== Competition record ==
Year	Competition	Venue	Position	Event	Notes
Representing Chinese Taipei
2009	Asian Youth Games	Singapore	2nd	Javelin throw (700 g)	71.97 m
2009	World Youth Championships	Brixen, Italy	21st (q)	Javelin throw (700 g)	63.21 m
2010	Asian Junior Championships	Hanoi, Vietnam	2nd	Javelin throw	73.26 m
2010	World Junior Championships	Moncton, Canada	8th	Javelin throw	71.58 m
2010	Youth Olympic Games	Singapore	12th (B)	Javelin throw (700 g)	65.94 m
2011	Asian Championships	Kobe, Japan	11th	Javelin throw	67.86 m
2012	Asian Junior Championships	Colombo, Sri Lanka	1st	Javelin throw	74.68 m
2012	World Junior Championships	Barcelona, Spain	16th (q)	Javelin throw	67.88 m
2013	Universiade	Kazan, Russia	23rd (q)	Javelin throw	65.38 m
2014	Asian Games	Incheon, South Korea	5th	Javelin throw	81.61 m
2015	Asian Championships	Wuhan, China	7th	Javelin throw	73.71 m
2015	Universiade	Gwangju, South Korea	4th	Javelin throw	79.35 m
2017	Asian Championships	Bhubaneswar, India	6th	Javelin throw	80.03 m
2017	World Championships	London, England	22nd (q)	Javelin throw	77.87 m
2017	Universiade	Taipei, Taiwan	1st	Javelin throw	91.36 m
2018	Asian Games	Jakarta, Indonesia	5th	Javelin throw	79.81 m
2019	Asian Championships	Doha, Qatar	1st	Javelin throw	86.72 m
2019	World Championships	Doha, Qatar	10th	Javelin throw	77.99 m
2021	Olympic Games	Tokyo, Japan	30th (q)	Javelin throw	71.20 m
2023	Asian Championships	Bangkok, Thailand	7th	Javelin throw	69.54 m
2023	Asian Games	Hangzhou, China	10th	Javelin throw	67.03 m
2025	Asian Championships	Gumi, South Korea	15th (q)	Javelin throw	70.80 m

Records
Preceded by (China) Zhao Qinggang	Men's Javelin Asian Record Holder; 26 August 2017 – 8 August 2024	Succeeded by (Pakistan) Arshad Nadeem
