= Till Wöschler =

German javelin thrower

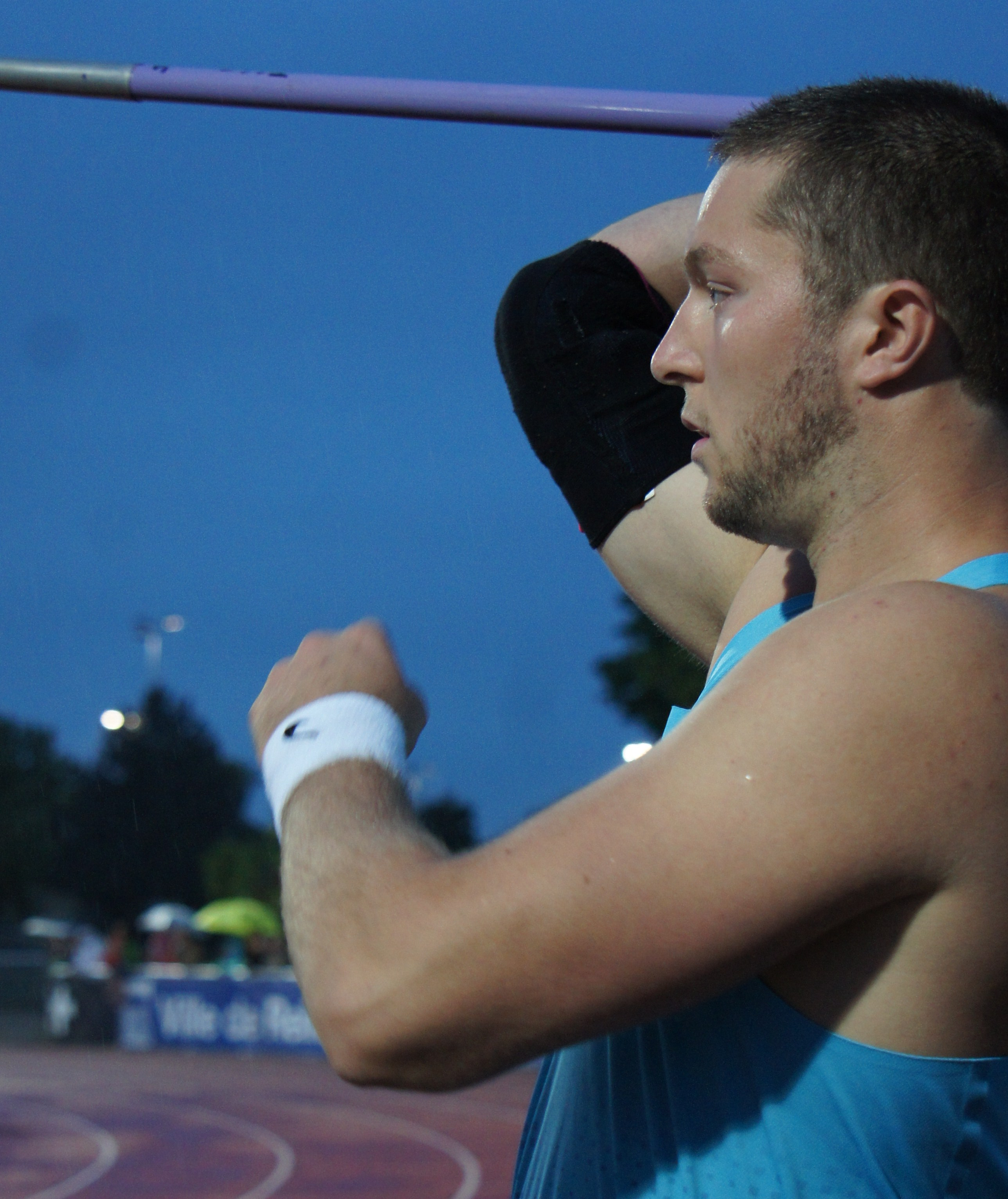
- Till Wöschler in 2013

Medal record

Men's athletics

Representing Germany

World Junior Championships
| Gold medal – first place | 2010 Moncton | Javelin throw |

Till Wöschler (born 9 June 1991 in Saarbrücken) is a German javelin thrower. He represents the sports club LAZ Zweibrücken.

== Career ==
At the 2010 World Junior Championships in Athletics, Wöschler won gold with a distance of 82.52 m, a national junior record for which he received the IAAF rising star award

== Personal bests ==
| Event | Best (m) | Venue | Date |
|---|---|---|---|
| Javelin throw | 84.38 | Ostrava, Czech Republic | 2011 |
