= Robert Szpak =

Polish javelin thrower

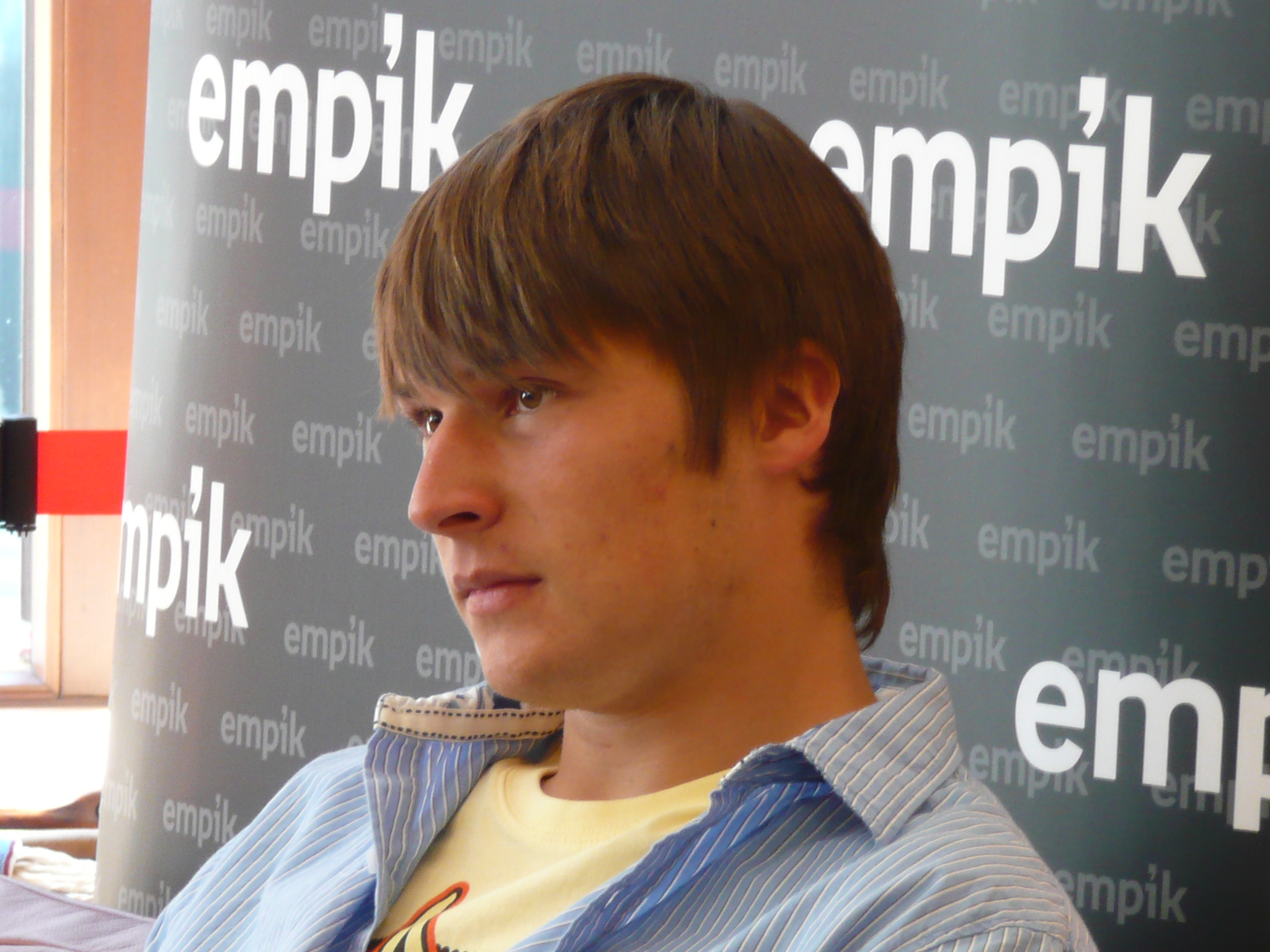
- Robert Szpak, 2009

Personal information
- Born: 31 December 1989 (age 36) Kołobrzeg, Poland
Medal record
Representing Poland
Men's athletics
World Junior Championships
Gold medal – first place	2008 Bydgoszcz	Javelin throw

Robert Szpak (born 31 December 1989 in Kołobrzeg) is a Polish athlete, who specialises in the javelin throw. He represented Poland at the 2008 World Junior Championships in Bydgoszcz, Poland and took the gold medal in the javelin with a personal best throw of 78.01 metres. He achieved a new personal best of 78.33 m in June 2009 in Ostrava.

== Personal bests ==
Event	Date	Venue	Distance
Javelin throw	17 June 2009	Ostrava, Czech Republic	78.33 metres

Season's best progression
Year	Best (m)
2006	66.80
2007	74.50
2008	78.01
2009	78.33
