= Davinder Singh Kang =

Indian javelin thrower

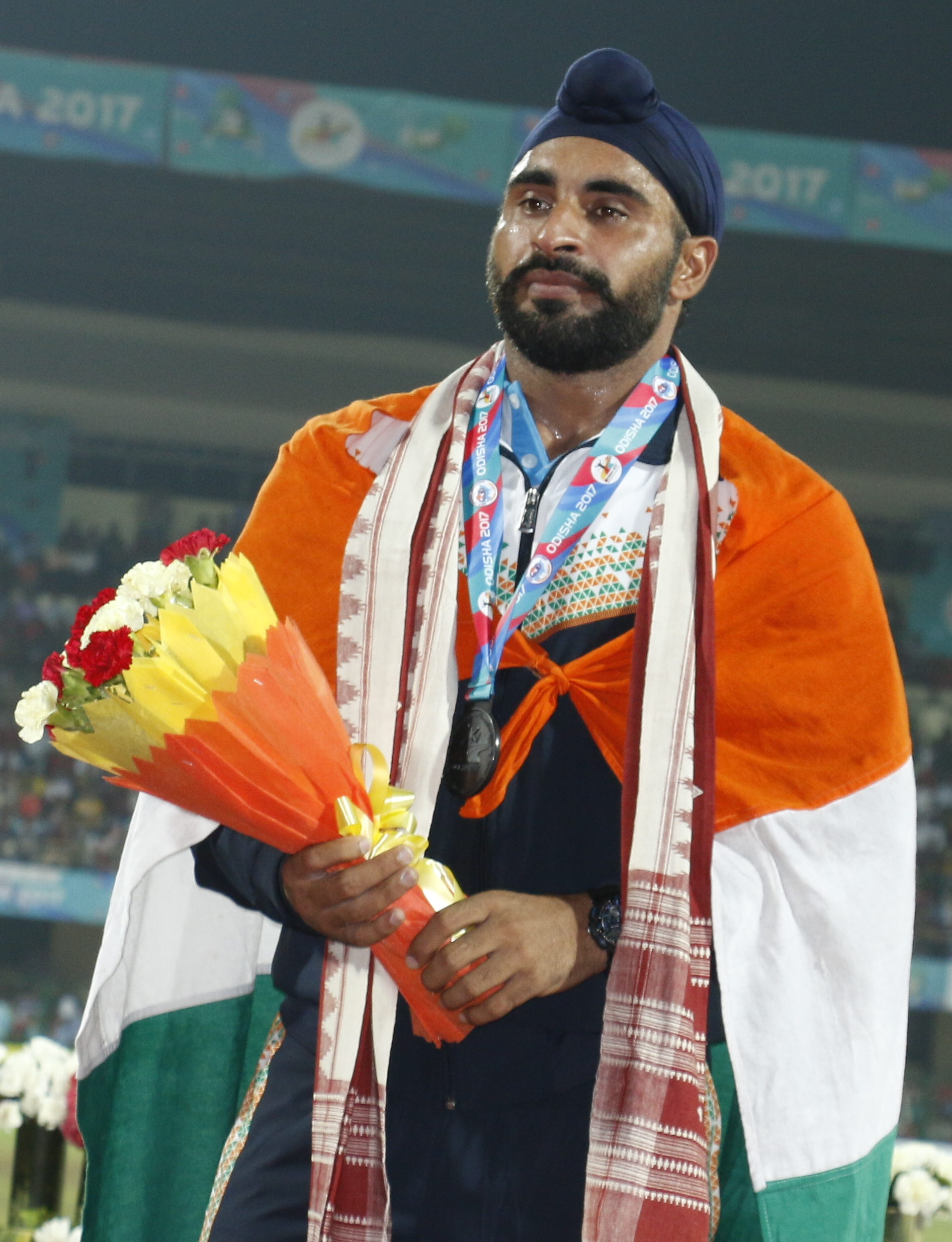
- Kang with the bronze medal at the 2017 Asian Athletics Championships

Personal information
- Born: 18 December 1988 (age 37) Chak Shakur, Jalandhar district, Punjab, India

Sport
- Country: India
- Event: Javelin throw

Achievements and titles
- Personal best: 84.57m (Patiala 2017)
Medal record
Men's Javelin throw
Representing India
Asian Championships
Bronze medal – third place	2017 Bhubaneshwar	Javelin
- Updated on 12 August 2017

Davinder Singh Kang (born 18 December 1988) is an Indian track and field athlete who competes in the javelin throw event. Kang won the bronze medal at the 2017 Asian Athletics Championships with a throw of 83.29m. At the 2017 World Championships in Athletics in August 2017, he became the first Indian to qualify for the final of the javelin throw event at the World Athletics Championships with a throw of 84.22m, the seventh best mark in the qualification round.
