= 2012 European Athletics Championships – Men's javelin throw =

Men's javelin throw at the European Athletics Championships

The men's javelin throw at the 2012 European Athletics Championships was held at the Helsinki Olympic Stadium on 27 and 28 June.

== Medalists ==
Gold	Vítězslav Veselý; Czech Republic
Silver	Valeriy Iordan; Russia
Bronze	Ari Mannio; Finland

== Records ==
Standing records prior to the 2012 European Athletics Championships
World record	Jan Železný (CZE)	98.48	Jena, Germany	25 May 1996
European record	Jan Železný (CZE)	98.48	Jena, Germany	25 May 1996
Championship record	Steve Backley (GBR)	89.72	Budapest, Hungary	23 August 1998
World Leading	Vítězslav Veselý (CZE)	88.11	Oslo, Norway	7 June 2012
European Leading	Vítězslav Veselý (CZE)	88.11	Oslo, Norway	7 June 2012

== Schedule ==
Date	Time	Round
27 June 2012	18:15	Qualification
28 June 2012	18:45	Final

== Results ==
=== Qualification ===
Qualification: Qualification Performance 83.00 (Q) or at least 12 best performers advance to the final

Rank	Group	Athlete	Nationality	#1	#2	#3	Result	Notes
1	A	Ari Mannio	Finland	77.81	84.31		84.31	Q, SB
2	B	Oleksandr Pyatnytsya	Ukraine	82.37	81.66	x	82.37	q
3	A	Igor Janik	Poland	82.37	x	x	82.37	q, SB
4	B	Valeriy Iordan	Russia	82.32	–	–	82.32	q, PB
5	B	Kim Amb	Sweden	76.78	80.69	–	80.69	q
6	B	Tero Pitkämäki	Finland	77.70	80.66	–	80.66	q
7	B	Tino Häber	Germany	76.25	76.67	79.86	79.86	q
8	A	Risto Mätas	Estonia	79.34	77.03	x	79.34	q
9	B	Andreas Thorkildsen	Norway	79.34	–	–	79.34	q
10	A	Vítězslav Veselý	Czech Republic	x	78.45	79.09	79.09	q
11	A	Paweł Rakoczy	Poland	79.02	x	x	79.02	q
12	A	Gabriel Wallin	Sweden	75.83	78.66	78.89	78.89	q
13	A	Thomas Röhler	Germany	x	77.95	78.89	78.89	
14	A	Fatih Avan	Turkey	78.27	x	78.31	78.31	
15	A	Ainārs Kovals	Latvia	x	76.32	71.33	76.32	
16	B	Mark Frank	Germany	x	72.61	75.55	75.55	
17	B	Bartosz Osewski	Poland	74.82	75.26	x	75.26	
18	A	Oleksandr Nychyporchuk	Ukraine	70.54	74.91	74.35	74.91	
19	A	Marko Jänes	Estonia	70.99	74.74	71.71	74.74	SB
20	B	Dejan Mileusnic	Bosnia and Herzegovina	72.95	69.16	73.84	73.84	
21	A	Melik Janoyan	Armenia	69.40	66.20	72.59	72.59	
22	A	Matija Kranjc	Slovenia	72.49	70.67	70.18	72.49	
23	A	Zigismunds Sirmais	Latvia	x	71.02	72.42	72.42	
DQ	A	Yervásios Filippídis	Greece	~~69.34~~	~~72.39~~	~~70.98~~	~~72.39~~	Doping
24	B	Tanel Laanmäe	Estonia	71.87	x	68.94	71.87	
25	B	Martin Benák	Slovakia	69.23	70.60	69.97	70.60	
26	B	Petr Frydrych	Czech Republic	68.31	x	68.88	68.88	
	B	Vadims Vasiļevskis	Latvia	x	x	x	NM	
	B	Teemu Wirkkala	Finland	x	–	–	NM	

=== Final ===
Rank	Athlete	Nationality	#1	#2	#3	#4	#5	#6	Result	Notes
1st place, gold medalist(s)	Vítězslav Veselý	Czech Republic	74.04	83.72	74.63	78.61	83.51	77.64	83.72	
2nd place, silver medalist(s)	Valeriy Iordan	Russia	83.23	x	79.92	–	–	74.63	83.23	PB
3rd place, bronze medalist(s)	Ari Mannio	Finland	75.93	82.17	x	82.63	x	79.04	82.63	
4	Andreas Thorkildsen	Norway	81.55	78.12	77.07	–	–	–	81.55	
5	Oleksandr Pyatnytsya	Ukraine	81.41	x	78.81	80.73	80.10	77.25	81.41	
6	Igor Janik	Poland	79.58	81.21	x	x	79.04	x	81.21	
7	Kim Amb	Sweden	77.30	79.03	73.39	67.35	–	–	79.03	
8	Gabriel Wallin	Sweden	71.76	77.18	74.61	73.26	74.43	76.42	77.18	
9	Tino Häber	Germany	71.87	76.11	74.25				76.11	
10	Risto Mätas	Estonia	75.85	72.92	74.48				75.85	
11	Tero Pitkämäki	Finland	74.89	x	74.10				74.89	
12	Paweł Rakoczy	Poland	x	70.93	x				70.93	
