= Athletics at the 2016 Summer Olympics – Men's javelin throw =

Men's javelin throw at the Games of the XXXI Olympiad
- Venue: Olympic Stadium
- Dates: 17 August 2016 (qualifications); 20 August 2016 (final)
- Competitors: 37 from 23 nations
- Winning distance: 90.30 m

Medalists
1st place, gold medalist(s)		Thomas Röhler	Germany
2nd place, silver medalist(s)		Julius Yego	Kenya
3rd place, bronze medalist(s)		Keshorn Walcott	Trinidad and Tobago

Official Video Highlights

The men's javelin throw competition at the 2016 Summer Olympics in Rio de Janeiro, Brazil. The event was held at the Olympic Stadium between August 17–20.

== Summary ==
Defending champion, Keshorn Walcott started the final with a respectable 83.45 m. The second thrower was Johannes Vetter who topped it with an 85.32 m. The eighth thrower in the round was reigning World Champion Julius Yego, who tossed it 88.24 m (289 ft 6 in), landing on his hands to avoid a face plant on the runway. He moved into the gold medal position. The next competitor was the number one thrower in 2016, Thomas Röhler who answered with an 87.40 m to move into silver position. On his second attempt, Walcott threw it 85.38 to move into bronze position by just 6 cm, still more than 3 metres short of the mark he threw in the qualifying round. Nobody was able to improve in the next two rounds. As the final thrower in the fourth round, Yego twisted his left ankle during his fouled attempt. He limped to the bench and was wheelchair out of the stadium still in gold medal position. On his fifth attempt, Röhler threw it 90.30 m (296 ft 3 in), less than a foot short of the Olympic record, to move ahead of Yego. Nobody was able to improve their position in the final round and the gold medal was confirmed. After treatment, Yego limped back into the stadium to congratulate Röhler and celebrate his silver medal by limping around his victory lap.

The medals for the competition were presented by Richard Peterkin, St. Lucia, Member of the International Olympic Committee, and the gifts were presented by Antti Pihlakoski, IAAF Council Member.

== Competition format ==
Each athlete received three throws in the qualifying round. The nine athletes who achieved the qualifying distance progressed to the final. A further three athletes who did not achieve the qualifying distance also advanced to the final. All twelve starters were allowed three throws in the final, with the top eight athletes after that point receiving three further attempts.

== Schedule ==
All times are Brasilia Time (UTC-3)

Date	Time	Round
Wednesday, 17 August 2016	20:30	Qualifications
Saturday, 20 August 2016	20:55	Finals

== Records ==
Prior to the competition, the existing World and Olympic records were as follows.

World record	Jan Železný (CZE)	98.48 m	Jena, Germany	25 May 1996
Olympic record	Andreas Thorkildsen (NOR)	90.57 m	Beijing, China	23 August 2008
2016 World leading	Thomas Röhler (GER)	91.28 m	Turku, Finland	29 June 2016

== Results ==
=== Qualifying round ===
Qualification rule: qualification standard 83.00m (Q) or at least best 12 qualified (q).

Rank	Group	Name	Nationality	#1	#2	#3	Result	Notes
1	B	Keshorn Walcott	Trinidad and Tobago	88.68			88.68	Q
2	B	Johannes Vetter	Germany	85.96			85.96	Q
3	A	Julian Weber	Germany	84.46			84.46	Q
4	B	Ryohei Arai	Japan	84.16			84.16	Q
5	B	Petr Frydrych	Czech Republic	78.57	80.17	83.60	83.60	Q
6	B	Julius Yego	Kenya	78.88	x	83.55	83.55	Q
7	A	Jakub Vadlejch	Czech Republic	78.23	80.90	83.27	83.27	Q
8	A	Dmytro Kosynskyy	Ukraine	80.08	76.79	83.23	83.23	Q
9	A	Thomas Röhler	Germany	79.47	81.61	83.01	83.01	Q
10	B	Vítězslav Veselý	Czech Republic	81.32	81.32	82.85	82.85	q
11	B	Antti Ruuskanen	Finland	82.20	x	x	82.20	q
12	A	Braian Toledo	Argentina	78.99	81.96	80.36	81.96	q
13	A	Joshua Robinson	Australia	78.87	80.84	76.78	80.84	
14	B	Zigismunds Sirmais	Latvia	76.87	80.65	75.95	80.65	
15	A	Marcin Krukowski	Poland	x	78.06	80.62	80.62	
16	B	Júlio César de Oliveira	Brazil	79.33	80.49	80.29	80.49	
17	A	Kim Amb	Sweden	77.91	78.75	80.49	80.49	
18	B	Tanel Laanmäe	Estonia	80.45	78.78	79.24	80.45	
19	B	John Ampomah	Ghana	79.09	80.39	78.90	80.39	
20	A	Cyrus Hostetler	United States	76.48	78.69	79.76	79.76	
21	A	Tero Pitkämäki	Finland	77.91	78.58	79.56	79.56	
22	A	Risto Mätas	Estonia	76.23	79.26	79.40	79.40	
23	A	Magnus Kirt	Estonia	x	77.60	79.33	79.33	
24	A	Rocco van Rooyen	South Africa	x	71.05	78.48	78.48	SB
25	B	Hamish Peacock	Australia	77.91	76.22	76.40	77.91	
26	B	Ivan Zaytsev	Uzbekistan	73.49	72.92	77.83	77.83	
27	B	Ari Mannio	Finland	77.14	76.77	77.73	77.73	
28	A	Rolands Štrobinders	Latvia	76.76	x	77.73	77.73	
29	A	Stuart Farquhar	New Zealand	74.24	77.32	74.38	77.32	
30	A	Ahmed Bader Magour	Qatar	x	77.19	x	77.19	
31	B	Łukasz Grzeszczuk	Poland	76.31	76.52	76.14	76.52	
32	A	Leslie Copeland	Fiji	76.04	75.68	x	76.04	
33	B	Huang Shih-feng	Chinese Taipei	74.33	x	x	74.33	
34	B	Sam Crouser	United States	73.78	73.66	x	73.78	
35	B	Sean Furey	United States	69.40	72.61	71.35	72.61	
36	A	RM Sumeda Ranasinghe	Sri Lanka	69.62	71.93	x	71.93	
—	A	Bobur Shokirjonov	Uzbekistan	x	x	x	NM	

=== Final ===
Rank	Name	Nationality	#1	#2	#3	#4	#5	#6	Result	Notes
1st place, gold medalist(s)	Thomas Röhler	Germany	87.40	85.61	87.07	84.84	90.30	x	90.30	
2nd place, silver medalist(s)	Julius Yego	Kenya	88.24	x	–	x	*		88.24	SB
3rd place, bronze medalist(s)	Keshorn Walcott	Trinidad and Tobago	83.45	85.38	83.38	80.33	x	x	85.38	
4	Johannes Vetter	Germany	85.32	x	82.54	x	83.61	81.74	85.32	
5	Dmytro Kosynskyy	Ukraine	82.51	83.95	83.64	81.61	81.21	x	83.95	PB
6	Antti Ruuskanen	Finland	x	77.81	83.05	x	x	80.00	83.05	
7	Vítězslav Veselý	Czech Republic	78.20	82.51	x	x	x	78.63	82.51	
8	Jakub Vadlejch	Czech Republic	80.02	82.42	81.59	80.32	x	x	82.42	
9	Julian Weber	Germany	80.29	80.13	81.36	did not advance			81.36	
10	Braian Toledo	Argentina	77.89	79.51	79.81	did not advance			79.81	
11	Ryohei Arai	Japan	77.98	79.47	72.49	did not advance			79.47	
12	Petr Frydrych	Czech Republic	76.15	76.79	79.12	did not advance			79.12	

* – Julius Yego retired from the competition after his fourth throw due to an ankle injury, but nevertheless won silver due to his first throw.
