= Track and field at the 2011 Military World Games – Men's javelin throw =

The men's javelin throw event at the 2011 Military World Games was held on 20 July at the Estádio Olímpico João Havelange.

== Records ==
Prior to this competition, the existing world and CISM record were as follows:

World Record	Jan Železný (CZE)	98.48	Jena, Germany	25 May 1996
CISM World Record	A. Mourovev (RUS)	86.20	Tours, France	August 1993

== Schedule ==
Date	Time	Round
20 July 2011	16:10	Final

== Medalists ==
Gold	Silver	Bronze
Ari Mannio; Finland	Spyridon Lempessis; Greece	Matija Kranjc; Slovenia

== Results ==
=== Final ===
Rank	Athlete	Nationality	#1	#2	#3	#4	#5	#6	Mark	Notes
1st place, gold medalist(s)	Ari Mannio	Finland	77.26	77.38	76.44	80.73	82.48	x	82.48	
2nd place, silver medalist(s)	Spyridon Lempessis	Greece	73.99	74.37	74.83	74.52	73.47	76.35	76.35	
3rd place, bronze medalist(s)	Matija Kranjc	Slovenia	68.85	70.41	71.48	x	72.65	74.71	74.71	
4	Kashinath Naik	India	x	68.43	x	73.74	73.70	74.17	74.17	
5	Leonardo Gottardo	Italy	72.11	x	70.23	70.40	72.18	x	72.18	
6	Franz Burghagen	Germany	71.28	67.83	x	71.74	x	69.97	71.74	
7	Georgios Iltsios	Greece	67.53	70.83	69.56	69.60	71.55	70.82	71.55	
8	Alexander Vieweg	Germany	70.78	x	70.84	67.87	–	–	70.84	
9	Martin Benak	Slovakia	57.83	65.20	67.04				67.04	
10	Adam Burke	United States	62.75	61.90	63.70				63.70	
11	Rubio Orielson Cabrera	Colombia	58.24	63.36	x				63.36	
12	Moctar Djigui	Mali	62.71	63.05	59.62				63.05	
13	Aadel Al Mehairi	United Arab Emirates	57.97	56.21	56.32				57.97	
14	Angelo Mercuur	Suriname	39.07	44.38	40.33				44.38	
