= Thomas Röhler =

German javelin thrower

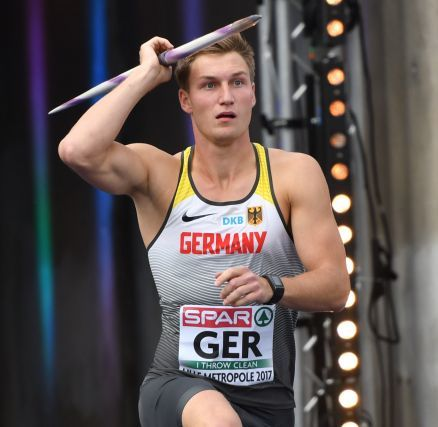
- Röhler competing in 2017

Personal information
- Born: 30 September 1991 (age 35) Jena, Germany
- Height: 1.91 m (6 ft 3 in)
- Weight: 90 kg (198 lb)

Sport
- Country: Germany
- Sport: Track and field
- Event: Javelin throw

Achievements and titles
- Personal best: 93.90 m (2017)
Medal record
Men's athletics
Representing Germany
Olympic Games
Gold medal – first place	2016 Rio de Janeiro	Javelin throw
European Championships
Gold medal – first place	2018 Berlin	Javelin throw
Representing Europe
Continental Cup
Gold medal – first place	2018 Ostrava	Javelin throw
- Updated on 9 September 2018

Thomas Röhler (born 30 September 1991) is a German track and field athlete who competes in the javelin throw. He is the 2016 Olympic Champion and 2018 European Champion. His personal best of 93.90 m for the event ranks him third on the overall list.

== Career ==
=== Athletic performance ===
Röhler began taking part in track and field as a child in 1998. Raised in Jena, he attended the Johann Christoph Friedrich GutsMuths Sports High school in the city and went on to study at the University of Jena. He first competed mainly as a high jumper and a triple jumper. He began to make his impact as a junior (under-20) athlete in the javelin throw in 2010. That year he threw beyond seventy metres for the first time and represented his country at the 2010 World Junior Championships in Athletics, where he finished in ninth place. He ended that year with a personal best throw of 76.37 m (250 ft 6 1/2 in) to place second at the German junior championships. The following year he improved to 78.20 m (256 ft 6 1/2 in) – a throw which brought him seventh place at the 2011 European Athletics U23 Championships.

He established himself as a senior athlete in 2012. He cleared eighty metres for the first time at a meeting in Sankt Wendel, getting a mark of 80.79 m (265 ft 1/2 in), which ranked him 54th in the world that year. More crucial was his first national title win at the 2012 German Athletics Championships, where he defeated the more experienced Tino Häber. His personal best was not sufficient for entry to the 2012 London Olympics, but he was selected for the 2012 European Athletics Championships. On his senior debut for Germany, he placed 13th in javelin qualifying, equalling the mark of finalist Gabriel Wallin, but missing out due to having a shorter second throw.

The 2013 season saw him achieve his first international medals and he consistently threw beyond eighty metres in competition. At the 2013 European Cup Winter Throwing in March, he was the runner-up behind Latvia's Zigismunds Sirmais. At the end of May, he threw 83.95 m (275 ft 5 in) at a meeting in Dessau – a performance that placed him 16th in the world that season. On his debut on the 2013 IAAF Diamond League circuit, he placed top three at the Bislett Games. He was the silver medallist at the 2013 European Team Championships and retained his national title at the 2013 German Athletics Championships. In a high-quality competition at the 2013 European Athletics U23 Championships, he came third behind Sirmais and German teammate Bernhard Seifert. Röhler was chosen to compete for Germany at the 2013 World Championships in Athletics and on his global senior debut he did not perform well, having his worst competition of the year and failing to better 75 metres. He ended the year with a seventh-place finish at the Memorial Van Damme Diamond League meet.

He and Latvian rival Sirmais repeated their placings at the 2014 European Cup Winter Throwing, the German again finishing second. He made regular appearances on the 2014 IAAF Diamond League circuit: he was fifth at the Prefontaine Classic and Bislett Games, then threw a best of 84.74 m (278 ft 0 in) for third at the Meeting Areva in Paris. He improved this further at the Glasgow Grand Prix, throwing the javelin 86.99 m (285 ft 4 3/4 in) to take a surprise victory over reigning world champion Vítězslav Veselý.

At the 2016 Summer Olympics in Rio de Janeiro, he won the gold medal with a throw of 90.30 m, narrowly missing the Olympic record of 90.57 m set by Andreas Thorkildsen of Norway during the 2008 Beijing Olympics. In May 2017 Röhler launched the javelin to 93.90m at the Diamond League opener in Doha, Qatar. With that throw he moved to 2nd place on the world all-time list.

At the 2017 IAAF World Championships, he finished fourth with a throw of 88.26 m, six centimetres behind third place.

In July 2018, he won silver at the 2018 German Athletics Championships, with a throw of 88.09 m. In August, he won gold at the 2018 European Athletics Championships with a throw of 89.47 m. He won another gold medal in September, at the 2018 IAAF Continental Cup, with an 87.07 m throw.

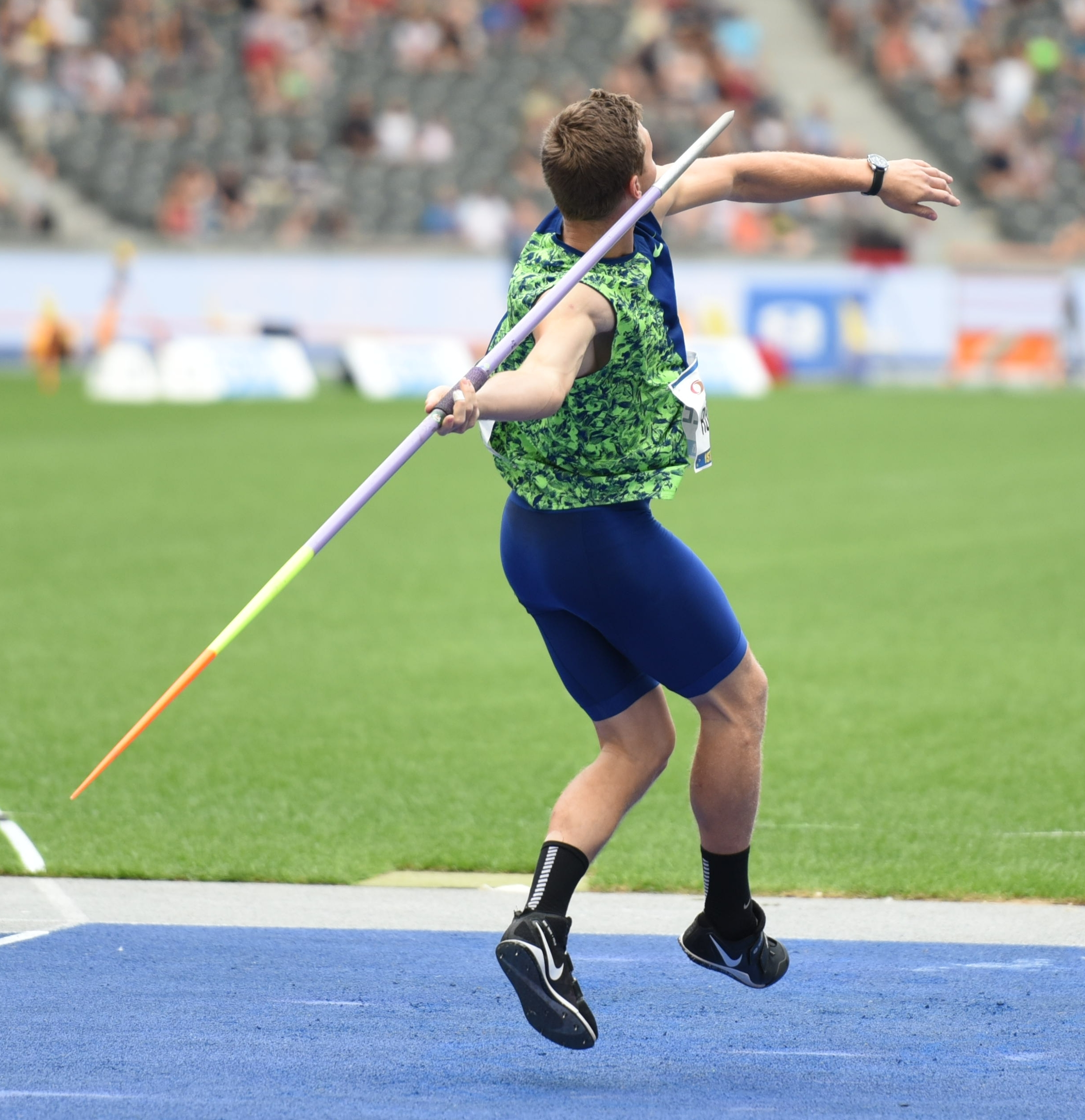
Röhler at ISTAF Berlin 2019

At the 2019 World Athletics Championships, Röhler, with a best throw at 79.23 m, did not progress from the qualifying round. Following this qualifying-round exit at the 2019 World Athletics Championships in Doha, Röhler experienced physical setbacks. In June 2021, he suffered a back injury during training forcing him to withdraw from the Tokyo Olympic Games.

He spent the next few seasons recovering and adjusting his technique, making brief international appearances, including the 2022 European Athletics Championships in Munich, where he was eliminated in the qualifiying round (71.31m). Röhler gradually returned to regular international competition, clearing 80m in 2024 (for the first time since 2019) and throwing a season´s best of 83.33m in 2026.

=== Off-field roles ===
Röhler has served as an athlete representative in various roles, including the World Athletics Athletes Commission, advocating for athlete welfare.

== Competition record ==
Year	Competition	Venue	Position	Event	Notes
Representing Germany
2012	European Championships	Helsinki, Finland	13th (q)	Javelin throw	78.89 m
2013	European Throwing Cup	Castellón, Spain	2nd	Javelin throw	81.87 m
2013	World Championships	Moscow, Russia	29th (q)	Javelin throw	74.45 m
2014	European Throwing Cup	Leiria, Portugal.	2nd	Javelin throw	81.17 m
2014	European Championships	Zürich, Switzerland	12th	Javelin throw	70.31 m
2015	World Championships	Beijing, China	4th	Javelin throw	87.41 m
2016	European Championships	Amsterdam, Netherlands	5th	Javelin throw	80.78 m
2016	Olympic Games	Rio de Janeiro, Brazil	1st	Javelin throw	90.30 m
2017	World Championships	London, England	4th	Javelin throw	88.26 m
2018	European Championships	Berlin, Germany	1st	Javelin throw	89.47 m
2019	World Championships	Doha, Qatar	23rd (q)	Javelin throw	79.23 m
2022	European Championships	Munich, Germany	22nd (q)	Javelin throw	71.31 m
2026	European Championships	Birmingham, United Kingdom	14th (q)	Javelin throw	78.67 m

== Seasonal bests by year ==
View chart definition.
- 2009 – 52.96
- 2010 – 76.37
- 2011 – 78.20
- 2012 – 80.79
- 2013 – 83.95
- 2014 – 87.63
- 2015 – 89.27
- 2016 – 91.28
- 2017 – 93.90
- 2018 – 91.78
- 2019 – 86.99
