= Athletics at the 2015 Pan American Games – Men's javelin throw =

Men's javelin throw at the 2015 Pan American Games
- Venue: CIBC Pan Am and Parapan Am Athletics Stadium
- Dates: July 24
- Competitors: 12 from 8 nations
- Winning distance: 83.27

Medalists
Gold medal	Keshorn Walcott	Trinidad and Tobago
Silver medal	Riley Dolezal	United States
Bronze medal	Júlio César de Oliveira	Brazil

The men's javelin throw competition of the athletics events at the 2015 Pan American Games took place on July 24 at the CIBC Pan Am and Parapan Am Athletics Stadium. The defending Pan American Games champion is Guillermo Martínez of Cuba.

== Records ==
Prior to this competition, the existing world and Pan American Games records were as follows:

World record	Jan Železný (CZE)	98.48	Jena, Germany	May 25, 1996
Pan American Games record	Guillermo Martínez (CUB)	87.20	Guadalajara, Mexico	October 28, 2011

== Qualification ==
Each National Olympic Committee (NOC) was able to enter up to two entrants providing they had met the minimum standard (71.03) in the qualifying period (January 1, 2014 to June 28, 2015).

== Schedule ==
Date	Time	Round
July 24, 2015	17:35	Final

== Results ==
All results shown are in meters.

KEY:	q	Best non-qualifiers	Q	Qualified	NR	National record	PB	Personal best	SB	Seasonal best	DQ	Disqualified

=== Final ===
Rank	Name	Nationality	#1	#2	#3	#4	#5	#6	Mark	Notes
1st place, gold medalist(s)	Keshorn Walcott	Trinidad and Tobago	79.03	83.27	x	–	–	–	83.27	
2nd place, silver medalist(s)	Riley Dolezal	United States	77.17	75.99	76.28	81.62	76.49	79.70	81.62	SB
3rd place, bronze medalist(s)	Júlio César de Oliveira	Brazil	80.29	80.94	x	80.21	x	x	80.94	
4	Braian Toledo	Argentina	x	76.07	77.68	74.52	72.44	73.02	77.68	
5	Sean Furey	United States	76.30	74.86	77.41	x	74.68	77.41	77.41	
6	Dayron Márquez	Colombia	x	75.86	73.76	x	71.32	72.93	75.86	
7	Evan Karakolis	Canada	72.16	75.09	73.64	x	–	69.13	75.09	PB
8	Guillermo Martínez	Cuba	70.99	69.90	74.79	72.45	71.39	72.57	74.79	
9	Osmany Laffita	Cuba	69.15	74.50	x				74.50	
10	Víctor Fatecha	Paraguay	73.81	x	x				73.81	
11	Raymond Dykstra	Canada	x	69.17	73.73				73.73	
12	Shakeil Waithe	Trinidad and Tobago	x	70.85	73.21				73.21	
