= Athletics at the 2007 Summer Universiade – Men's javelin throw =

The men's javelin throw event at the 2007 Summer Universiade was held on 9–11 August.

== Medalists ==
Gold	Silver	Bronze
Vadims Vasiļevskis; Latvia	Igor Janik; Poland	Ainārs Kovals; Latvia

== Results ==
=== Qualification ===
Qualification: 76.00 m (Q) or at least 12 best (q) qualified for the final.

Rank	Group	Athlete	Nationality	#1	#2	#3	Result	Notes
1	B	Vadims Vasiļevskis	Latvia	80.81			80.81	Q
2	A	Ainārs Kovals	Latvia	x	74.97	79.65	79.65	Q
3	A	Joshua Robinson	Australia	76.87			76.87	Q
4	A	Igor Janik	Poland	73.44	x	x	73.44	q
5	B	Tommie du Toit	South Africa	71.98	73.24	–	73.24	q
6	B	Matija Kranjc	Slovenia	73.01	x	–	73.01	q
7	B	Qin Qiang	China	70.19	70.92	72.52	72.52	q
8	A	Wang Qingbo	China	72.15	70.95	71.77	72.15	q
9	B	Konstantinos Vertoudos	Greece	69.15	69.86	70.74	70.74	q
10	B	Rafael Baraza	Spain	x	70.46	69.91	70.46	q
11	B	Risto Mätas	Estonia	x	68.97	x	68.97	q
12	A	Jung Sang-Jin	South Korea	68.23	67.37	68.22	68.23	q
13	B	Tomas Intas	Lithuania	67.60	x	66.73	67.60	
14	A	Ilya Korotkov	Russia	66.71	x	–	66.71	
15	B	Martin Marić	Croatia	65.15	x	x	65.15	
16	B	Ammar Al-Najm	Iraq	62.63	63.71	63.05	63.71	
17	A	Nontach Palanupat	Thailand	58.79	62.81	63.57	63.57	SB
18	B	Yves Sambou	Senegal	63.53	61.69	61.04	63.53	
19	A	Melik Janoyan	Armenia	x	x	63.13	63.13	
20	A	Leslie Copeland	Fiji	x	62.57	x	62.57	
21	A	Pikisane Lokwalo	Botswana	62.18	x	60.15	62.18	SB
22	B	Javier Ugarte	Nicaragua	62.18	x	60.15	62.18	
23	B	Sanya Buathong	Thailand	61.28	x	60.75	61.28	
24	A	Dinesh Perera	Sri Lanka	53.91	53.52	56.06	56.06	
25	B	Timo Moorast	Estonia	x	55.43	x	55.43	
	B	Rawad Hassan	Lebanon				DNS	

=== Final ===
Rank	Athlete	Nationality	#1	#2	#3	#4	#5	$6	Result	Notes
1st place, gold medalist(s)	Vadims Vasiļevskis	Latvia	83.92	x	–	–	–	–	83.92	
2nd place, silver medalist(s)	Igor Janik	Poland	76.24	74.91	82.28	–	–	–	82.28	
3rd place, bronze medalist(s)	Ainārs Kovals	Latvia	82.23	78.44	x	x	x	79.64	82.23	
4	Qin Qiang	China	74.07	72.75	77.92	x	76.45	x	77.92	
5	Joshua Robinson	Australia	77.86	74.88	71.98	x	76.42	72.79	77.86	
6	Risto Mätas	Estonia	77.29	76.39	74.84	72.61	x	73.36	77.29	
7	Matija Kranjc	Slovenia	x	75.57	68.31	69.24	–	–	75.57	
8	Konstantinos Vertoudos	Greece	69.63	71.45	74.46	72.52	x	72.26	74.46	
9	Jung Sang-Jin	South Korea	x	x	74.22				74.22	
10	Tommie du Toit	South Africa	69.32	72.34	72.77				72.77	
11	Wang Qingbo	China	68.88	67.80	67.92				68.88	
12	Rafael Baraza	Spain	66.23	67.53	65.74				67.53	
