= Athletics at the 2012 Summer Olympics – Men's javelin throw =

Men's javelin throw at the Games of the XXX Olympiad
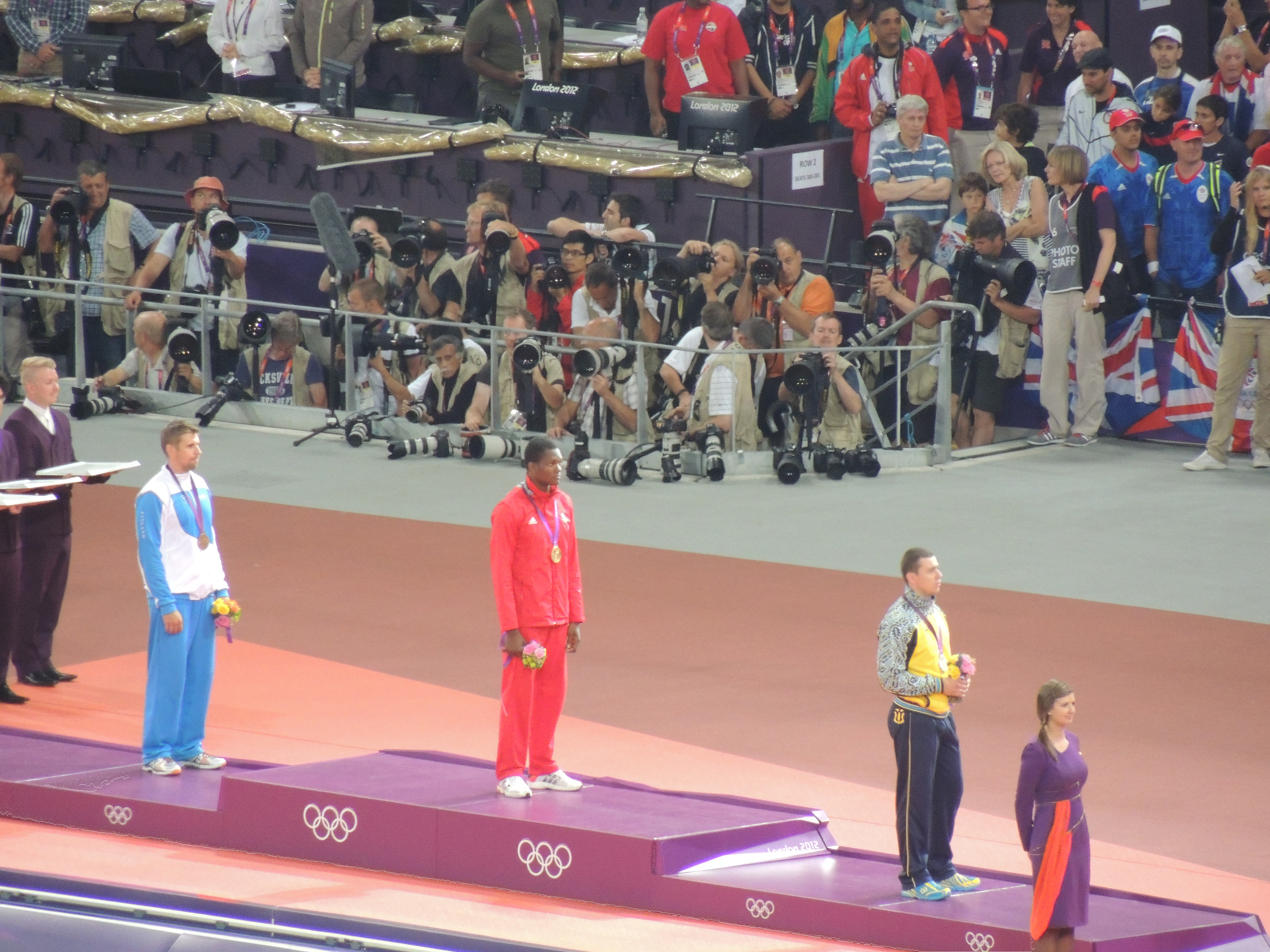
- Men's javelin throw victory ceremony
- Venue: Olympic Stadium
- Date: 8–11 August
- Competitors: 44 from 31 nations
- Winning distance: 84.58

Medalists
1st place, gold medalist(s)		Keshorn Walcott; Trinidad and Tobago
2nd place, silver medalist(s)		Antti Ruuskanen; Finland
3rd place, bronze medalist(s)		Vítězslav Veselý; Czech Republic

Official Video Highlight

The Men's javelin throw competition at the 2012 Summer Olympics in London, United Kingdom. The event was held at the Olympic Stadium on 8–11 August.

== Competition format ==
Each athlete receives three throws in the qualifying round. All who achieve the qualifying distance progress to the final. If fewer than twelve athletes achieve this mark, then the twelve furthest throwing athletes reach the final. Each finalist is allowed three throws in last round, with the top eight athletes after that point being given three further attempts.

== Summary ==
Seven athletes hit the automatic qualifying mark, two on their first attempt. 80.39 was the last qualifier. Julius Yego set a new national record for Kenya. With his one throw, Vítězslav Veselý improved his 2012 world lead to 88.34.

In the first round of the final, 19-year-old world junior champion Keshorn Walcott, only the 10th place qualifier, took the lead with an 83.51 national record for Trinidad and Tobago. Spiridon Lebesis was the only other competitor over 80 m in that round. In the second round Walcott improved his record out to 84.58 metres (277 feet 6 inches). 2007 World Champion Tero Pitkämäki moved into second place and two-time defending champion Andreas Thorkildsen (Norway) moved into third, but that was to be his best throw. In the third round Oleksandr Pyatnytsya threw 84.51, just 7 cm out of Walcott's lead. Nobody made a move in the fourth round. In the fifth round Antti Ruuskanen threw 84.12 to move into third place. In the final round Vesely put out his best throw of the competition, but his 83.34 was only good enough for 4th place, exactly 5 meters behind his lone throw in the qualifying round the day before. Walcott's mark of 84.58 was the shortest winning throw since the 1988 Seoul Olympics - the first with the [then] new, re-balanced javelin - when Tapio Korjus (Finland) won with 84.28m.

On August 9, 2016, Ukrainian Oleksandr Pyatnytsya was disqualified after his anti-doping test sample was reanalyzed and found positive (dehydrochlormethyltestosterone). On February 24, 2017 Antti Ruuskanen received the silver medal in Finland. Vítězslav Veselý received the bronze medal during Golden Spike Ostrava on 28 June 2017.

== Schedule ==
All times are British Summer Time (UTC+1)

Date	Time	Round
Wednesday, 8 August 2012	19:05	Qualifications
Saturday, 11 August 2012	19:20	Finals

== Records ==
Prior to the competition, the existing world record, Olympic record, and world leading mark were as follows:

World record	Jan Železný (CZE)	98.48 m	Jena, Germany	25 May 1996
Olympic record	Andreas Thorkildsen (NOR)	90.57 m	Beijing, China	23 August 2008
2012 World leading	Vítězslav Veselý (CZE)	88.11 m	Oslo, Norway	7 June 2012

The Following new National records were set during this competition

Kenya national record	Julius Yego (KEN)	81.81 m
Trinidad and Tobago national record	Keshorn Walcott (TRI)	84.58 m

== Results ==
=== Qualifying round ===
Qual. rule: qualification standard 82.00m (Q) or at least best 12 qualified (q).

Rank	Group	Athlete	Nationality	#1	#2	#3	Result	Notes
1	B	Vítězslav Veselý	Czech Republic	88.34	–	–	88.34	Q, WL, PB
2	A	Andreas Thorkildsen	Norway	76.20	84.47	–	84.47	Q
3	B	Tero Pitkämäki	Finland	76.53	x	83.01	83.01	Q
~~4~~	B	~~Oleksandr Pyatnytsya~~	~~Ukraine~~	~~77.07~~	~~82.72~~	–	~~82.72~~	~~Q~~, DQ
5	A	Spiridon Lebesis	Greece	81.80	82.40	–	82.40	Q
6	A	Stuart Farquhar	New Zealand	82.32	–	–	82.32	Q
7	B	Roderick Genki Dean	Japan	71.58	82.07	–	82.07	Q
8	A	Ari Mannio	Finland	81.99	x	76.25	81.99	q
9	B	Julius Yego	Kenya	79.10	79.33	81.81	81.81	q, NR
10	B	Keshorn Walcott	Trinidad and Tobago	78.91	76.44	81.75	81.75	q
11	B	Antti Ruuskanen	Finland	77.83	81.74	x	81.74	q
12	A	Tino Häber	Germany	78.19	69.54	80.39	80.39	q
13	A	Leslie Copeland	Fiji	77.00	80.19	72.52	80.19	SB
14	A	Roman Avramenko	Ukraine	79.15	77.03	80.06	80.06	
15	A	Uladzimir Kazlou	Belarus	x	79.10	80.06	80.06	
16	A	Guillermo Martinez	Cuba	75.39	80.06	77.22	80.06	
17	A	Ainārs Kovals	Latvia	77.42	76.45	79.19	79.19	
18	B	Kim Amb	Sweden	x	71.85	78.94	78.94	
19	A	Igor Janik	Poland	76.01	78.90	x	78.90	
20	B	Fatih Avan	Turkey	78.74	78.20	78.87	78.87	
21	A	Risto Mätas	Estonia	70.34	78.56	76.30	78.56	
22	A	Curtis Moss	Canada	74.21	78.13	78.22	78.22	
23	B	Craig Kinsley	United States	72.80	71.47	78.18	78.18	
24	A	Yukifumi Murakami	Japan	76.37	77.80	77.77	77.80	
25	B	Jakub Vadlejch	Czech Republic	x	77.61	x	77.61	
26	B	Dayron Marquez	Colombia	75.15	77.59	76.50	77.59	
27	B	Jarrod Bannister	Australia	77.38	76.23	x	77.38	
28	A	Paweł Rakoczy	Poland	77.36	73.22	73.44	77.36	
29	A	Ihab Abdelrahman El Sayed	Egypt	72.93	77.35	75.19	77.35	
30	B	Braian Toledo	Argentina	76.87	x	73.30	76.87	
31	B	Jung Sangjin	South Korea	76.37	74.77	x	76.37	
32	A	Cyrus Hostetler	United States	70.62	75.76	75.00	75.76	
33	A	Ilya Korotkov	Russia	75.68	x	x	75.68	
34	A	Petr Frydrych	Czech Republic	69.54	70.44	75.46	75.46	
35	B	Mervyn Luckwell	Great Britain	74.09	x	x	74.09	
36	A	Ivan Zaytsev	Uzbekistan	73.07	73.94	71.39	73.94	
37	B	Sean Furey	United States	x	72.81	71.86	72.81	
38	A	Vadims Vasilevskis	Latvia	x	72.81	x	72.81	
39	B	Melik Janoyan	Armenia	72.64	70.81	68.72	72.64	
40	B	Matija Kranjc	Slovenia	72.63	69.70	71.17	72.63	
41	A	Qin Qiang	China	72.29	68.76	65.28	72.29	
42	B	Bartosz Osewski	Poland	x	x	71.19	71.19	
–	B	Matthias De Zordo	Germany	x	x	x	NM	
–	B	Zigismunds Sirmais	Latvia	x	x	x	NM	

=== Final ===
Rank	Athlete	Nationality	#1	#2	#3	#4	#5	#6	Result	Notes
1st place, gold medalist(s)	Keshorn Walcott	Trinidad and Tobago	83.51	84.58	x	80.64	x	–	84.58	NR
2nd place, silver medalist(s)	Antti Ruuskanen	Finland	79.60	81.09	81.60	81.97	84.12	79.88	84.12	
3rd place, bronze medalist(s)	Vítězslav Veselý	Czech Republic	x	81.69	81.80	x	80.32	83.34	83.34	
4	Tero Pitkämäki	Finland	77.33	82.68	80.67	80.46	82.80	82.53	82.80	
5	Andreas Thorkildsen	Norway	x	82.63	x	81.70	x	x	82.63	
6	Spiridon Lebesis	Greece	81.21	81.91	81.27	80.36	x	79.45	81.91	
7	Tino Haber	Germany	76.99	74.33	81.21	79.95	76.36	75.85	81.21	
8	Stuart Farquhar	New Zealand	76.80	76.64	80.22	–	–	–	80.22	
9	Roderick Genki Dean	Japan	x	79.95	x	–	–	–	79.95	
10	Ari Mannio	Finland	78.60	77.71	x	–	–	–	78.60	
11	Julius Yego	Kenya	72.59	77.15	74.08	–	–	–	77.15	
DSQ	~~Oleksandr Pyatnytsya~~	~~Ukraine~~	~~77.47~~	~~81.61~~	~~84.51~~	~~81.53~~	~~81.01~~	~~83.53~~	~~84.51~~	DQ
