= 2014 European Athletics Championships – Men's javelin throw =

Men's javelin throw at the European Athletics Championships

The men's javelin throw at the 2014 European Athletics Championships took place at the Letzigrund on 14 and 17 August.

== Medalists ==
Gold	Antti Ruuskanen; Finland
Silver	Vítězslav Veselý; Czech Republic
Bronze	Tero Pitkämäki; Finland

== Results ==
=== Qualification ===
81.00 (Q) or at least 12 best performers (q) advanced to the Final.

Rank	Group	Name	Nationality	#1	#2	#3	Mark	Note
1	B	Antti Ruuskanen	Finland	83.76			83.76	Q
2	B	Tero Pitkämäki	Finland	81.48			81.48	Q
3	B	Thomas Röhler	Germany	81.24			81.24	Q
4	B	Ansis Brūns	Latvia	73.68	75.12	81.04	81.04	Q
5	A	Dmitriy Tarabin	Russia	80.46	80.84	–	80.84	q
6	A	Matija Kranjc	Slovenia	80.46	–	–	80.46	q, NR
7	A	Vítězslav Veselý	Czech Republic	80.00	x	x	80.00	q
8	A	Andreas Hofmann	Germany	75.22	79.59	75.63	79.59	q
9	B	Oleksandr Nychyporchuk	Ukraine	79.09	76.09	79.29	79.29	q
10	B	Risto Mätas	Estonia	78.97	76.86	76.18	78.97	q
11	B	Valeriy Iordan	Russia	78.46	x	75.76	78.46	q
12	A	Lassi Etelätalo	Finland	77.78	78.13	78.22	78.22	q
13	B	Łukasz Grzeszczuk	Poland	77.74	76.71	x	77.74	
14	A	Ainārs Kovals	Latvia	77.38	x	77.70	77.70	
15	B	Aliaksandr Ashomka	Belarus	x	77.65	70.24	77.65	
16	A	Rolands Štrobinders	Latvia	76.16	x	x	76.16	
17	B	Martin Benák	Slovakia	73.53	x	75.67	75.67	
18	A	Tanel Laanmäe	Estonia	75.29	x	x	75.29	
19	B	Petr Frydrych	Czech Republic	74.61	74.18	75.19	75.19	
20	B	Jakub Vadlejch	Czech Republic	69.82	75.14	x	75.14	
21	A	Oleksandr Pyatnytsya	Ukraine	74.69	73.15	x	74.69	
22	B	Magnus Kirt	Estonia	74.33	73.18	x	74.33	
23	A	Patrik Ženúch	Slovakia	74.19	x	71.89	74.19	
24	B	Spyridon Lebesis	Greece	74.14	x	74.00	74.14	
25	A	Fatih Avan	Turkey	x	73.11	73.28	73.28	
26	A	Gabriel Wallin	Sweden	71.43	73.16	x	73.16	
27	A	Dejan Mileusnić	Bosnia and Herzegovina	71.23	70.44	72.52	72.52	
28	A	Dmytro Kosynskyy	Ukraine	71.08	71.90	68.92	71.90	
29	A	Vedran Samac	Serbia	67.30	68.77	69.39	69.39	
30	A	Norbert Bonvecchio	Italy	x	69.38	68.63	69.38	
	B	Kim Amb	Sweden	x	x	x	NM	
	B	Guðmundur Sverrisson	Iceland	x	x	x	NM	

=== Final ===
Rank	Name	Nationality	#1	#2	#3	#4	#5	#6	Result	Notes
1st place, gold medalist(s)	Antti Ruuskanen	Finland	83.81	86.85	88.01	83.69	84.62	83.67	88.01	PB
2nd place, silver medalist(s)	Vítězslav Veselý	Czech Republic	76.04	81.98	81.68	82.68	84.79	79.16	84.79	
3rd place, bronze medalist(s)	Tero Pitkämäki	Finland	80.21	84.16	80.83	81.45	83.89	84.40	84.40	
4	Lassi Etelätalo	Finland	78.29	x	79.74	78.01	83.16	x	83.16	
5	Dmitriy Tarabin	Russia	80.35	x	x	x	81.24	x	81.24	
6	Risto Mätas	Estonia	80.73	77.87	76.23	76.70	79.17	x	80.73	SB
7	Valeriy Iordan	Russia	74.18	75.85	78.40	x	x	75.43	78.40	
8	Matija Kranjc	Slovenia	76.95	x	78.27	77.16	x	x	78.27	
9	Andreas Hofmann	Germany	71.08	76.05	77.42				77.42	
10	Oleksandr Nychyporchuk	Ukraine	x	x	75.05				75.05	
11	Ansis Brūns	Latvia	72.24	x	x				72.24	
12	Thomas Röhler	Germany	70.31	66.52	x				70.31	
