= 2004 World Junior Championships in Athletics – Men's javelin throw =

The men's javelin throw event at the 2004 World Junior Championships in Athletics was held in Grosseto, Italy, at Stadio Olimpico Carlo Zecchini on 14 and 16 July.

== Medalists ==
Gold	Aleksey Tovarnov; Russia
Silver	Lohan Rautenbach; South Africa
Bronze	Júlio de Oliveira; Brazil

== Results ==
=== Final ===
16 July

Rank	Name	Nationality	Attempts						Result	Notes
Rank	Name	Nationality	1	2	3	4	5	6	Result	Notes
1st place, gold medalist(s)	Aleksey Tovarnov	Russia	75.84	x	74.32	x	68.32	79.38	79.38	
2nd place, silver medalist(s)	Lohan Rautenbach	South Africa	74.28	74.42	73.90	68.40	70.84	x	74.42	
3rd place, bronze medalist(s)	Júlio de Oliveira	Brazil	71.17	72.19	72.07	x	73.86	68.23	73.86	
4	Joshua Robinson	Australia	71.35	70.56	69.86	69.38	73.76	71.70	73.76	
5	Yervásios Filippídis	Greece	66.94	70.58	73.37	70.98	-	68.13	73.37	
6	Ari Mannio	Finland	70.63	65.45	x	x	67.72	x	70.63	
7	Sebastian Jachimowicz	Poland	70.35	69.23	68.76	69.04	68.50	x	70.35	
8	Daniele Baiocchi	Italy	60.79	66.49	69.40	66.75	x	x	69.40	
9	Zoltán Magyari	Hungary	67.76	67.95	67.75				67.95	
10	Jan Syrovátko	Czech Republic	66.91	65.79	67.87				67.87	
11	Kazunori Onitsuka	Japan	66.09	64.91	67.84				67.84	
12	Gurkirat Singh	India	62.72	59.60	62.04				62.72	

=== Qualifications ===
14 July

==== Group A ====
Rank	Name	Nationality	Attempts			Result	Notes
Rank	Name	Nationality	1	2	3	Result	Notes
1	Lohan Rautenbach	South Africa	67.71	63.97	73.59	73.59	Q
2	Joshua Robinson	Australia	71.92	-	-	71.92	Q
3	Júlio de Oliveira	Brazil	70.36	-	-	70.36	Q
4	Jan Syrovátko	Czech Republic	67.21	62.40	65.79	67.21	q
5	Kazunori Onitsuka	Japan	64.63	64.79	67.06	67.06	q
6	Bence Papp	Hungary	66.76	63.30	66.50	66.76	
7	Fabian Heinemann	Germany	59.68	65.52	65.79	65.79	
8	Ma Yuxing	China	64.97	63.78	x	64.97	
9	Juha Pääkkönen	Finland	64.79	57.19	61.89	64.79	
10	Noel Moreno	Spain	x	59.93	62.51	62.51	
11	Brian Harris	United States	57.04	61.21	57.58	61.21	
12	Lin Heng-Chi	Chinese Taipei	59.83	55.53	57.48	59.83	

==== Group B ====
Rank	Name	Nationality	Attempts			Result	Notes
Rank	Name	Nationality	1	2	3	Result	Notes
1	Aleksey Tovarnov	Russia	x	x	73.74	73.74	Q
2	Yervásios Filippídis	Greece	70.58	-	-	70.58	Q
3	Ari Mannio	Finland	66.49	67.39	69.25	69.25	q
4	Zoltán Magyari	Hungary	67.83	67.41	68.59	68.59	q
5	Daniele Baiocchi	Italy	63.14	68.12	-	68.12	q
6	Sebastian Jachimowicz	Poland	63.14	67.96	x	67.96	q
7	Gurkirat Singh	India	63.16	66.84	x	66.84	q
8	Raldu Potgieter	South Africa	62.22	60.42	66.70	66.70	
9	Roman Avramenko	Ukraine	x	65.42	66.34	66.34	
10	Kang Hyo-Sung	South Korea	65.07	x	61.91	65.07	
11	Víctor Fatecha	Paraguay	58.81	64.45	62.83	64.45	
12	Andrew Vogelsberg	United States	x	59.89	60.60	60.60	
13	Kenley Olivas	Nicaragua	x	x	52.85	52.85	

== Participation ==
According to an unofficial count, 25 athletes from 21 countries participated in the event.

- Australia (1)
- Brazil (1)
- China (1)
- Chinese Taipei (1)
- Czech Republic (1)
- Finland (2)
- Germany (1)
- Greece (1)
- Hungary (2)
- India (1)
- Italy (1)
- Japan (1)
- Nicaragua (1)
- Paraguay (1)
- Poland (1)
- Russia (1)
- South Africa (2)
- South Korea (1)
- Spain (1)
- Ukraine (1)
- United States (2)
