= Keshorn Walcott =

Trinidadian javelin thrower

Keshorn Walcott ORTT
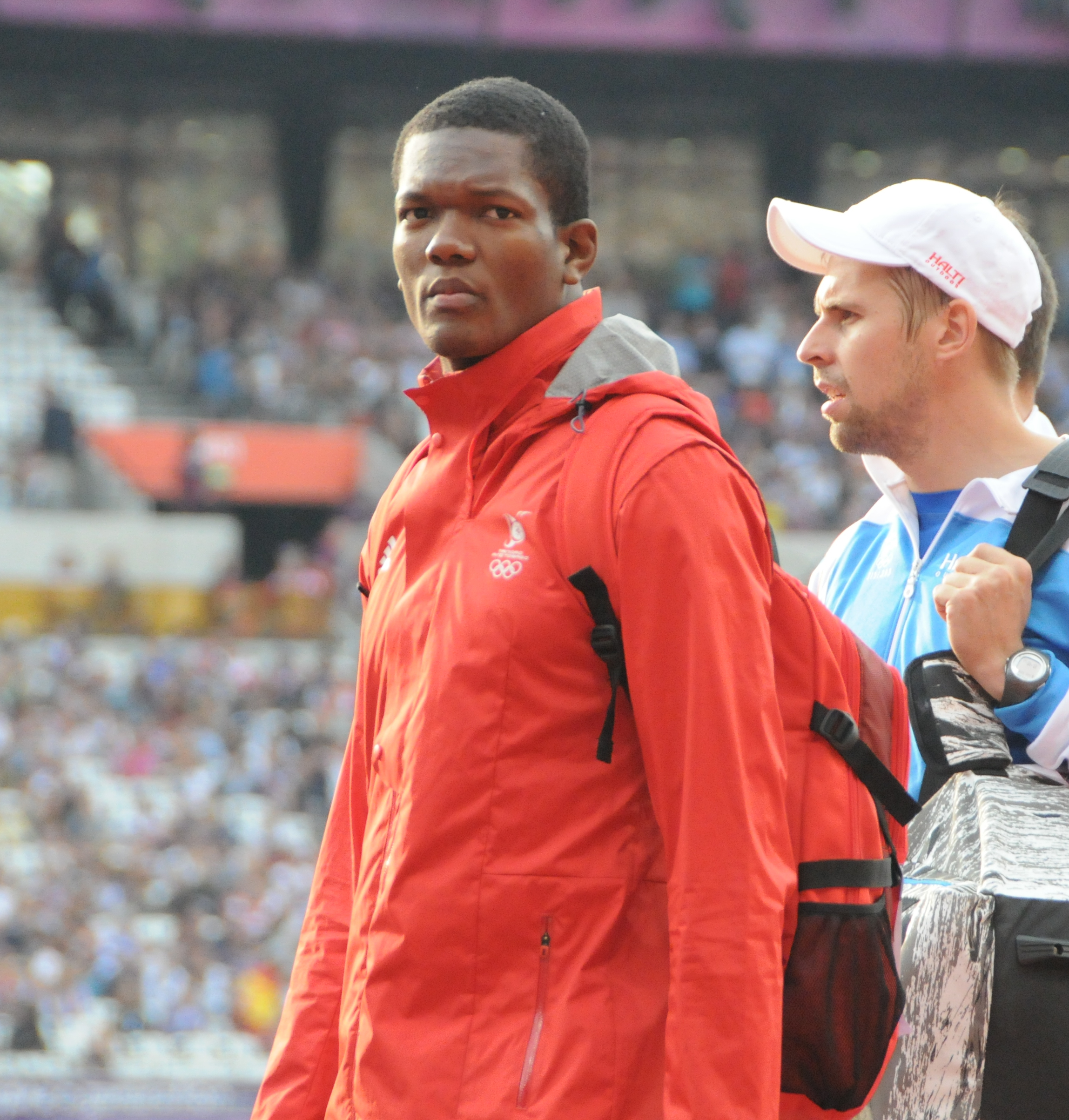
- Walcott at the 2012 London Olympics

Personal information
- Born: 2 April 1993 (age 33) Toco, Trinidad and Tobago
- Height: 1.83 m (6 ft 0 in)
- Weight: 90 kg (198 lb)

Sport
- Sport: Track and field
- Event: Javelin throw

Achievements and titles
- Personal bests: 90.16 m NR (2015)
Medal record
Men's javelin throw
Representing Trinidad and Tobago
Olympic Games
Gold medal – first place	2012 London	Javelin throw
Bronze medal – third place	2016 Rio de Janeiro	Javelin throw
World Championships
Gold medal – first place	2025 Tokyo	Javelin throw
Commonwealth Games
Silver medal – second place	2014 Glasgow	Javelin throw
Pan American Games
Gold medal – first place	2015 Toronto	Javelin throw
Silver medal – second place	2019 Lima	Javelin throw
Continental Cup
Gold medal – first place	2014 Marrakesh	Javelin throw
World Junior Championships
Gold medal – first place	2012 Barcelona	Javelin throw

Keshorn "Keshie" Walcott, ORTT (born 2 April 1993) is a Trinidadian track and field athlete who competes in the javelin throw. He is the 2012 Olympic champion and the 2025 World champion. He is the first Caribbean male athlete, as well as the first of African descent, to win the gold medal in a throwing event in the history of the Olympics. He is also the holder of the North, Central American and Caribbean junior record.

Walcott is the youngest Olympic gold medallist in the men's javelin (19 years 131 days), and the first athlete in any track and field event to win World Junior and Olympic titles in an individual event the same year. He is also the second-oldest gold medallist in the men's javelin at the World Championships (32 years 169 days).

== Career ==
=== Early life and medals ===
Born the third child of Beverly Walcott and Endy King, Walcott grew up playing football and cricket, striving to keep up with his athletically talented older brother Elton. He was raised in the fishing village of Toco, in north-east Trinidad. He did not take up the javelin until the age of 15, but found immediate success. By April 2009, one week after his 16th birthday, he was the Caribbean youth (under-17) champion.

In 2010 he stepped up to the standard regulation javelin (800-gram), and he continued his domination of the Caribbean junior division, as the three-time winner in the Junior (under-20) javelin throw at the CARIFTA Games in 2010 to 2012, setting a new NACAC North, Central American and Caribbean junior record in 2012.

=== 2012 World Junior Champion ===
He began the Olympic year in April with his fourth-consecutive victory at CARIFTA Juniors. A record throw of 77.59 m (254 ft 6 1/2 in) earned him the distinction of competing unbeaten throughout his CARIFTA career. In late May 2012 he twice improved his personal best, breaking through the 80-meter mark (262 feet) for the first time. At the Quantum Classic in Trinidad and Tobago he threw 78.94 m (258 ft 11 3/4 in), breaking Trinidad's national javelin record of 78.06 m (256 ft 1 in), set in 1996 by Kurt Thompson. It was also a NACAC junior record as well. One week later he reset all those marks, while competing at the IAAF International Centennial Meet in Havana, Cuba. He extended the records with a winning throw of 80.11 m (262 ft 9 3/4 in).

=== 2012 London Olympic Champion ===
In the stadium on Saturday evening 11 August, made conditions for the javelin throw less than ideal, and worse than during Wednesday's qualifying rounds. Walcott responded to the pressure of the Olympic finals by throwing a personal best distance on his first throw, giving him the lead, and then exceeding that distance on his second throw. He won the Olympic javelin gold medal with a throw of 84.58 m (277 ft 6 in). He defeated a string of top athletes to win the competition including 90-metre thrower Tero Pitkämäki and two-time defending Olympic champion Andreas Thorkildsen, as well as Veselý, Oleksandr Pyatnytsya and Antti Ruuskanen. This made Walcott the youngest-ever Olympic champion in javelin throw and the second non-European to win the Olympic gold in men's javelin throw since American thrower Cy Young in Helsinki in 1952.

Steve Backley, a former three-time Olympic medalist in the javelin remarked that it was a "surprise win for Keshorn Walcott. Everyone else struggled with the wind".

Following his Olympic victory, Walcott was hailed as a national hero. On 13 August, the day of his arrival back in Trinidad, was declared a national holiday. He was awarded $150,000 in cash and given land near his hometown of Toco, as well as a luxury home in Port of Spain. In addition, both the Toco lighthouse, (in north-east Trinidad) and the Toco Secondary School were renamed in his honour.

Walcott has been coached since 2009 by Cuban-born Ismael Lopez Mastrapa.

=== 2013 to 2014 ===
Walcott's 2013 season was hampered by injury. In his first competition since his Olympic victory, he "opened big", nearly matching his personal best with an opening round throw of 84.39 m (276 ft 10 1/4 in) at a hometown meet in Hasely Crawford Stadium in Port of Spain, Trinidad, on Friday 3 May.

In an early March 2014 interview with BBC Scotland, Walcott said that after some rest his ankle "is back to normal". With no World or Olympic competitions to aim for, his 2014 season will be targeted on the 2014 Commonwealth Games, to be held in Glasgow, Scotland. He had a six-week training camp in Cuba in March and planned to compete at a few events in May 2014, before taking part in another training camp in Europe so he can adjust to Glasgow's climate. He said, "My coach likes me to get away from a lot of distractions and just focus on training and being healthy." In the qualifying round of the 2014 Commonwealth Games, Kershorn threw a new personal best of 85.28 m (279 ft 9 1/4 in) on 1 August, but in the finals on 2 August he finished second with a throw of 82.67m, trailing Julius Yego of Kenya's winning 83.87m.

At the IAAF Diamond League's final meeting, the Weltklasse in Zurich, Switzerland on 28 August 2014, he set a new personal best/national record of 85.77 m (281 ft 5 in) in the opening round, finishing second behind Germany's Thomas Rohler's toss of 87.63m.

=== Tokyo Olympics 2020 ===
The 2012 London Olympic champion Keshorn Walcott did not qualify for the men's javelin throw final after finishing 7th in Group B in the qualification phase. Throwing in Group B, Walcott's best throw of 79.33 on his third throw placed him 7th in that group which was not good enough to qualify him for his third straight Olympic javelin final.

== Competition record ==
Year	Competition	Venue	Position	Event	Notes
Representing Trinidad and Tobago
2009	CARIFTA Games (U17)	Vieux Fort, Saint Lucia	1st	Javelin throw (700g)	59.30 m
2009	World Youth Championships	Brixen, Italy	13th (q)	Javelin throw (700g)	66.72 m
2010	CARIFTA Games (U20)	George Town, Cayman Islands	1st	Javelin throw	63.41 m
2010	Central American and Caribbean; Junior Championships (U20)	Santo Domingo, Dominican Republic	1st	Javelin throw	67.01 m
2010	World Junior Championships	Moncton, Canada	16th (q)	Javelin throw	66.05 m
2011	CARIFTA Games (U20)	Hamilton, Bermuda	1st	Javelin throw	72.04 m
2011	Central American and Caribbean Championships	Mayagüez, Puerto Rico	4th	Javelin throw	70.98 m
2011	Pan American Games	Guadalajara, Mexico	7th	Javelin throw	75.77 m
2012	CARIFTA Games (U20)	Hamilton, Bermuda	1st	Javelin throw	77.59 m
2012	Central American and Caribbean; Junior Championships (U20)	San Salvador, El Salvador	1st	Javelin throw	82.83 m
2012	World Junior Championships	Barcelona, Spain	1st	Javelin throw	78.64 m
2012	Olympic Games	London, United Kingdom	1st	Javelin throw	84.58 m (NR)
2013	World Championships	Moscow, Russia	19th (q)	Javelin throw	78.78 m
2014	Commonwealth Games	Glasgow, United Kingdom	2nd	Javelin throw	82.67 m
2015	Pan American Games	Toronto, Canada	1st	Javelin throw	83.27 m
2015	World Championships	Beijing, China	26th (q)	Javelin throw	76.83 m
2016	Olympic Games	Rio de Janeiro, Brazil	3rd	Javelin throw	85.38 m
2017	World Championships	London, United Kingdom	7th	Javelin throw	84.48 m
2018	Central American and Caribbean Games	Barranquilla, Colombia	1st	Javelin throw	84.47 m
2019	Pan American Games	Lima, Peru	2nd	Javelin throw	83.55 m
2019	World Championships	Doha, Qatar	11th	Javelin throw	77.47 m
2021	Olympic Games	Tokyo, Japan	16th (q)	Javelin throw	79.33 m
2022	World Championships	Eugene, United States	16th (q)	Javelin throw	78.87 m
2022	Commonwealth Games	Birmingham, United Kingdom	4th	Javelin throw	82.61 m
2022	NACAC Championships	Freeport, Bahamas	2nd	Javelin throw	83.94 m
2023	Central American and Caribbean Games	San Salvador, El Salvador	1st	Javelin throw	83.60 m
2024	Olympic Games	Paris, France	7th	Javelin throw	86.16 m
2025	World Championships	Tokyo, Japan	1st	Javelin throw	88.16 m
2026	Commonwealth Games	Glasgow, United Kingdom	6th	Javelin throw	82.55 m
2026	Central American and Caribbean Games	Santo Domingo, Dominican Republic	4th	Javelin throw	80.92 m
2026	World Ultimate Championship	Budapest, Hungary	4th	Javelin throw	82.41 m

== Seasonal bests ==
- 2010 – 67.01 m (219 ft 10 in)
- 2011 – 75.77 m (248 ft 7 in)
- 2012 – 84.58 m (277 ft 5 3/4 in)
- 2013 – 84.39 m (276 ft 10 1/4 in)
- 2014 – 85.77 m (281 ft 4 3/4 in)
- 2015 – 90.16 m (295 ft 9 1/2 in) NR
- 2016 – 88.68 m (290 ft 11 1/4 in)
- 2017 – 86.61 m (284 ft 1 3/4 in)

== See also ==
- Trinidad and Tobago at the 2012 Summer Olympics
- List of javelin throwers

Olympic Games
Preceded by Marc Burns	Flagbearer for Trinidad and Tobago; Rio de Janeiro 2016	Succeeded by Kelly-Ann Baptiste
