= Track and field at the 2015 Military World Games – Men's javelin throw =

The men's javelin throw event at the 2015 Military World Games was held on 5 October at the KAFAC Sports Complex.

== Records ==
Prior to this competition, the existing world and CISM record were as follows:

World Record	Jan Železný (CZE)	98.48	Jena, Germany	25 May 1996
CISM World Record	A. Mourovev (RUS)	86.20		1993

== Schedule ==
Date	Time	Round
5 October 2015	16:05	Final

== Medalists ==
Gold	Silver	Bronze
Ari Mannio; Finland	Júlio César de Oliveira; Brazil	Johannes Vetter; Germany

== Results ==
=== Final ===
Rank	Athlete	Nationality	#1	#2	#3	#4	#5	#6	Mark	Notes
1st place, gold medalist(s)	Ari Mannio	Finland	78.27	77.31	x	76.09	72.22	79.78	79.78	
2nd place, silver medalist(s)	Júlio César de Oliveira	Brazil	74.18	74.84	78.62	76.14	75.16	x	78.62	
3rd place, bronze medalist(s)	Johannes Vetter	Germany	73.72	74.71	77.37	x	77.03	76.52	77.37	
4	Julian Weber	Germany	74.83	76.24	77.34	70.23	68.97	73.26	77.34	
5	Dmitriy Tarabin	Russia	72.40	71.35	74.77	x	71.36	x	74.77	
6	Singh Devender	India	72.25	71.48	71.35	67.64	72.77	70.75	72.77	
7	Alex Kiprotich	Kenya	72.14	67.19	68.75	68.70	–	71.02	72.14	
8	Waruna Lakshan Rankoth Pedige	Sri Lanka	66.50	71.79	67.93	x	66.41	66.83	71.79	
9	Martin Benák	Slovakia	x	71.28	x				71.28	
10	Joni Karvinen	Finland	65.98	70.40	67.47				70.40	
11	Won Kil Park	South Korea	x	66.19	x				66.19	
12	Amrendra Singh	India	64.06	x	61.86				64.06	
13	Mohd Fadel M. A. Al-Muhannadi	Qatar	55.25	53.14	56.53				56.53	
14	Larbi Bourrada	Algeria	49.31	51.07	51.35				51.35	
15	Jaun Dhal	Suriname	39.46	34.46	–				39.46	
	Emmanuel Chimdzeka	Malawi							DNS	
	Pethias Barclays Gondwe Mdoka	Malawi							DNS	
	Mohamad Mohd Kaida	Qatar							DNS	
