= Melik Janoyan =

Armenian javelin thrower

Melik Janoyan (Armenian: Մելիք Ջանոյան, born 24 March 1985 in Leninakan) is an Armenian javelin thrower. He competed at the 2008 Summer Olympics in the men's javelin throw. Janoyan placed 37th with a mark of 64.47 metres. He competed at the 2012 Summer Olympics in the men's javelin throw. Janoyan placed 39th with a mark of 72.64 metres.

== Competition record ==
Year	Competition	Venue	Position	Notes
Representing Armenia
2005	Universiade	İzmir, Turkey	24th (q)	60.13 m
2007	European U23 Championships	Debrecen, Hungary	8th	72.80 m
2007	Universiade	Bangkok, Thailand	19th (q)	63.13 m
2008	Olympic Games	Beijing, China	37th (q)	64.47 m
2009	World Championships	Berlin, Germany	32nd (q)	74.74 m
2012	European Championships	Helsinki, Finland	21st (q)	72.59 m
2012	Olympic Games	London, United Kingdom	39th (q)	72.64 m
2013	Jeux de la Francophonie	Nice, France	7th	63.52 m
