= Jakub Vadlejch =

Czech javelin thrower

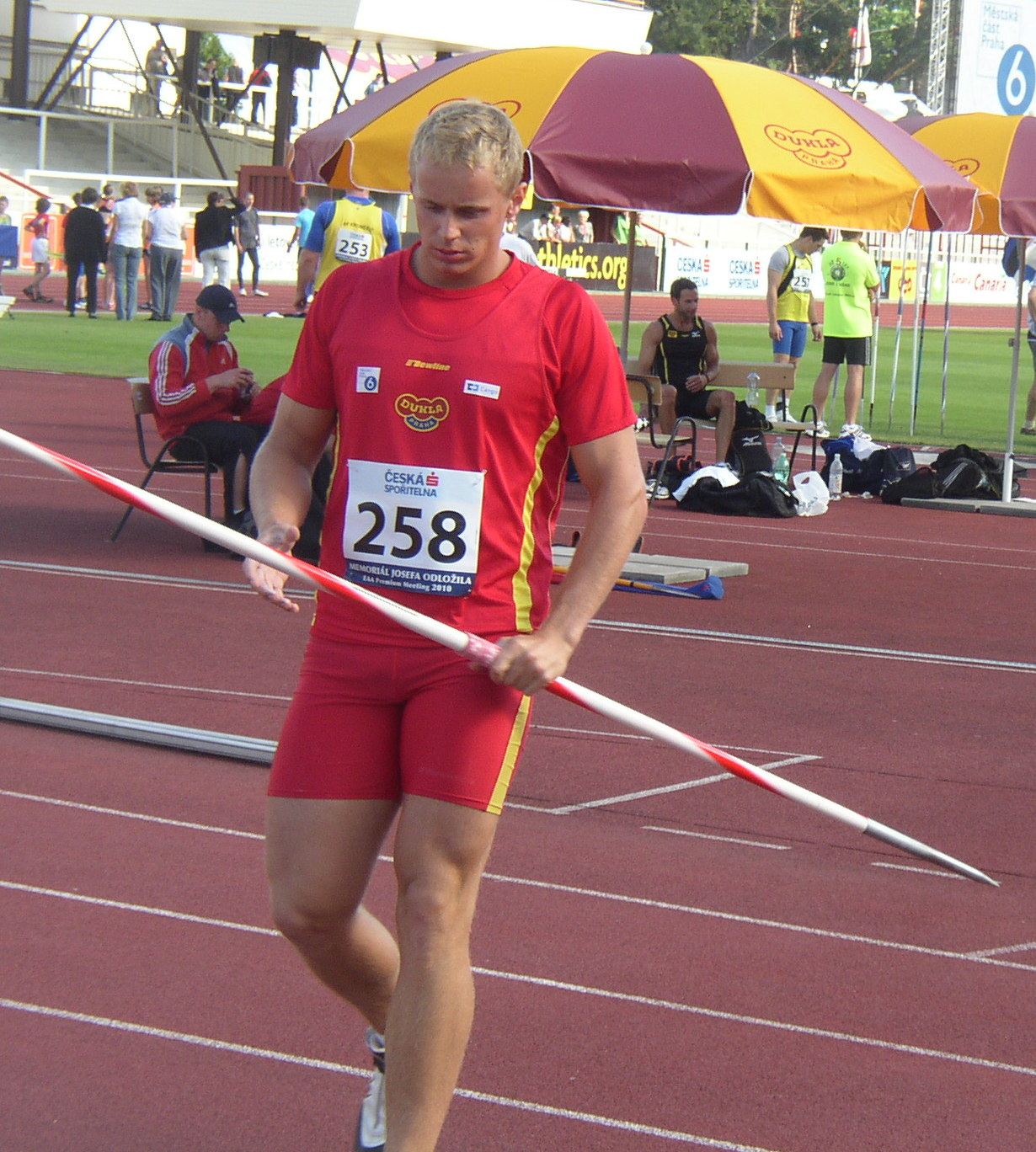
- Vadlejch in 2010

Personal information
- Nationality: Czech
- Born: 10 October 1990 (age 36) Prague, Czechoslovakia (now Czech Republic)
- Height: 1.90 m (6 ft 3 in)
- Weight: 93 kg (205 lb)

Sport
- Country: Czech Republic
- Sport: Track and field
- Rank: 3
- Event: Javelin throw

Achievements and titles
- Personal best: 90.88 m (2022)
Medal record
Men's athletics
Representing Czech Republic
Olympic Games
Silver medal – second place	2020 Tokyo	Javelin throw
World Championships
Silver medal – second place	2017 London	Javelin throw
Bronze medal – third place	2022 Eugene	Javelin throw
Bronze medal – third place	2023 Budapest	Javelin throw
Diamond League
First place	2016	Javelin Throw
First place	2017	Javelin Throw
First place	2023	Javelin Throw
European Championships
Gold medal – first place	2024 Rome	Javelin throw
Silver medal – second place	2022 Munich	Javelin throw

Jakub Vadlejch (Czech pronunciation: [ˈjakub ˈvadlɛjx]; born 10 October 1990) is a Czech track and field athlete who competes in the javelin throw. He is a four-time Olympian for the Czech Republic, having competed in 2012, 2016,2020 and 2024 winning a silver medal in 2020. He also has represented his country six times at the World Championships in Athletics (2011, 2015, 2017, 2019, 2022 and 2023), winning the bronze medal in 2022 and 2023 and silver medal in 2017, and six times a competitor at the European Athletics Championships (2010, 2014, 2016, 2018, 2022 and 2024), winning the silver medal in 2022 and the gold medal in 2024. He also won the 2016 Diamond League title, 2017 Diamond League title, and the 2023 Diamond League Title.

== Career ==
Born in Prague, Vadlejch took part in international javelin competitions from a young age, reaching the finals at the 2007 World Youth Championships in Athletics, 2008 World Junior Championships in Athletics and the 2009 European Athletics Junior Championships. His senior debut followed at the 2010 European Athletics Championships, where he threw in qualifying only. He competed in the javelin throw at the 2012 Summer Olympics and placed 25th with a mark of 77.61 metres. He was eliminated in the qualifying round at the 2011 World Championships in Athletics, 2014 European Athletics Championships, and 2015 World Championships in Athletics.

Vadlejch had his breakthrough season in 2016. He reached the final at the 2016 Summer Olympics, taking eighth place, and took victory on the 2016 IAAF Diamond League circuit, with three wins and a personal best of 88.02 m (288 ft 9 1/4 in) in the process. At the 2017 World Championships he set his new personal best, 89.73 m (294 ft 4 1/2 in), winning the silver medal.

=== 2020 Tokyo Olympic ===
He won the silver medal in the Men's Javelin throw event. He finished at the second spot behind India's Neeraj Chopra.

==== 2024 ====
In November 2024 he was declared for the forth consecutive time, Czech Athlete of the year. He came in first just before bronze javelin thrower medalist in Paris 2024, Nikola Ogrodníková.

== International competitions ==
Year	Competition	Venue	Position	Notes
Representing Czech Republic
2007	World Youth Championships	Ostrava, Czech Republic	12th	65.63 m
2008	World Junior Championships	Bydgoszcz, Poland	10th	68.79 m
2009	European Junior Championships	Novi Sad, Serbia	8th	69.63 m
2010	European Championships	Barcelona, Spain	16th (q)	76.04 m
2011	European U23 Championships	Ostrava, Czech Republic	–	NM
2011	World Championships	Daegu, South Korea	16th (q)	80.08 m
2012	Olympic Games	London, United Kingdom	25th (q)	77.61 m
2014	European Championships	Zürich, Switzerland	20th (q)	75.14 m
2015	World Championships	Beijing, China	20th (q)	78.95 m
2016	European Championships	Amsterdam, Netherlands	9th	78.12 m
2016	Olympic Games	Rio de Janeiro, Brazil	8th	82.42 m
2017	World Championships	London, United Kingdom	2nd	89.73 m
2018	European Championships	Berlin, Germany	8th	80.64 m
2019	World Championships	Doha, Qatar	5th	82.19 m
2021	Olympic Games	Tokyo, Japan	2nd	86.67 m
2022	World Championships	Eugene, Oregon	3rd	88.09 m
2022	European Championships	Munich, Germany	2nd	87.28 m
2023	World Championships	Budapest, Hungary	3rd	86.67 m
2024	European Championships	Rome, Italy	1st	88.65 m
2024	Olympic Games	Paris, France	4th	88.50 m
2025	World Championships	Tokyo, Japan	11th	78.71 m
2026	European Championships	Birmingham, United Kingdom	5th	82.88 m

== Circuit wins ==
Diamond League

- Overall title: 2016, 2017, 2023
- London Grand Prix: 2016
- Meeting Areva: 2016
- Weltklasse Zürich: 2016

== Seasonal bests ==
- 2008 – 76.57 m
- 2009 – 81.95 m
- 2010 – 84.47 m
- 2011 – 84.08 m
- 2012 – 80.40 m
- 2013 – 75.85 m
- 2014 – 82.97 m
- 2015 – 86.21 m
- 2016 – 88.02 m
- 2017 – 89.73 m
- 2018 – 89.02 m
- 2019 – 85.78 m
- 2020 – 84.31 m
- 2021 – 86.67 m
- 2022 – 90.88 m
- 2023 – 89.51 m
- 2024 – 88.65 m
