= 2015 World Championships in Athletics – Men's javelin throw =

Men's javelin throw at the 2015 World Championships
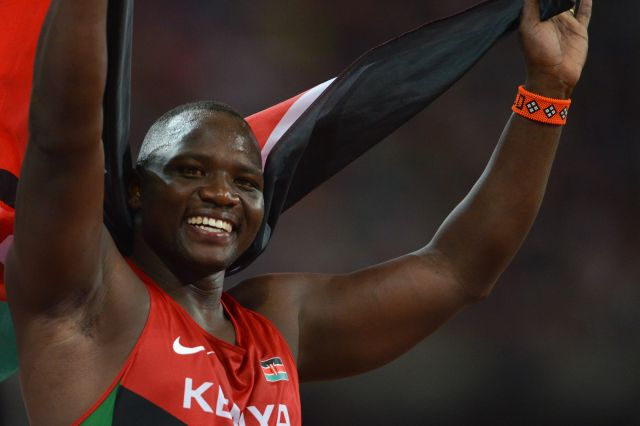
- Winner Julius Yego became the third farthest thrower in the history of the modern javelin
- Venue: Beijing National Stadium
- Dates: 24 August (qualification); 26 August (final)
- Competitors: 33 from 21 nations
- Winning distance: 92.72

Medalists
gold medal	Julius Yego	Kenya
silver medal	Ihab El-Sayed	Egypt
bronze medal	Tero Pitkämäki	Finland

The men's javelin throw at the 2015 World Championships in Athletics was held at the Beijing National Stadium on 24 and 26 August.

Two years earlier, Julius Yego was notable in fourth place, as a Kenyan athlete succeeding in a different event, one unrelated to distance running. His 85.40 national record put him one throw away from a medal. Since then, he has added six more metres to his record and came into this championship as the world leader and favorite. Vítězslav Veselý was back as the defending champion as was silver medalist Tero Pitkämäki. Dmitriy Tarabin, whose final throw took the bronze medal away from Yego and Olympic champion Keshorn Walcott did not make the final this time.

In the first round of the final Thomas Röhler took the lead with an 86.68. In the second round, Ihab El-Sayed took the lead with his season best 88.99. Meanwhile, Yego fouled his first attempt and his 82.45 only had him in 5th place and highly vulnerable to not making the top 8 after three throws, the requirement to get three more throws. On his third throw, he launched a 92.72. Not only did the throw put him in the lead, it was a new African record and the farthest throw in the world in 14 years, since world record holder Jan Železný threw 92.80 to win this championship in 2001, near the end of his top throwing days. It made Yego the third farthest thrower in the history of the contemporary javelin. He didn't need any more throws. In the fourth round Pitkämäki threw 87.64 to move into bronze medal position, which was confirmed when Röhler came up short in his effort to answer.

== Records ==
Prior to the competition, the records were as follows:

World record	Jan Železný (CZE)	98.48	Jena, Germany	25 May 1996
Championship record	Jan Železný (CZE)	92.80	Edmonton, Canada	12 August 2001
World leading	Julius Yego (KEN)	91.39	Birmingham, Great Britain	7 June 2015
African record	Julius Yego (KEN)	91.39	Birmingham, Great Britain	7 June 2015
Asian record	Zhao Qinggang (CHN)	89.15	Incheon, South Korea	2 October 2014
North, Central American and Caribbean record	Breaux Greer (USA)	91.29	Indianapolis, IN, United States	21 June 2007
South American record	Edgar Baumann (PAR)	84.70	San Marcos, TX, United States	17 October 1999
European record	Jan Železný (CZE)	98.48	Jena, Germany	25 May 1996
Oceanian record	Jarrod Bannister (AUS)	89.02	Brisbane, Australia	29 February 2008
The following records were established during the competition:
World leading	Julius Yego (KEN)	92.72	Beijing, China	26 August 2015
African record	Julius Yego (KEN)	92.72	Beijing, China	26 August 2015

== Qualification standards ==
Entry standards
82.00

== Schedule ==
Date	Time	Round
24 August 2015	19:00	Qualification
26 August 2015	19:05	Final

All times are local times (UTC+8)

== Results ==
KEY:	Q	Qualified	q	12 best performers	NR	National record	PB	Personal best	SB	Seasonal best

=== Qualification ===
Qualification: 83.00 m (Q) or at least 12 best performers (q).

Rank	Group	Name	Nationality	#1	#2	#3	Mark	Notes
1	B	Andreas Hofmann	Germany	86.14			86.14	Q, PB
2	A	Ryohei Arai	Japan	79.50	81.28	84.66	84.66	Q, SB
3	B	Julius Yego	Kenya	80.79	84.46		84.46	Q
4	B	Vítězslav Veselý	Czech Republic	83.63			83.63	Q
5	B	Tero Pitkämäki	Finland	79.67	83.43		83.43	Q
6	A	Braian Toledo	Argentina	83.32			83.32	Q, NR
7	A	Thomas Röhler	Germany	81.73	78.70	83.23	83.23	Q
8	B	Ihab El-Sayed	Egypt	82.85	–	–	82.85	q
9	A	Antti Ruuskanen	Finland	x	82.20	x	82.20	q
10	B	Kim Amb	Sweden	81.63	x	–	81.63	q
11	B	Risto Mätas	Estonia	72.93	77.72	81.56	81.56	q
12	B	Johannes Vetter	Germany	79.40	79.48	80.86	80.86	q
13	B	Tanel Laanmäe	Estonia	76.79	73.90	80.65	80.65	
14	A	Ari Mannio	Finland	80.19	77.79	x	80.19	
15	B	Júlio César de Oliveira	Brazil	79.81	78.36	79.51	79.81	
16	A	Lars Hamann	Germany	79.56	77.78	76.44	79.56	
17	B	Zhao Qinggang	China	x	79.47	75.77	79.47	SB
18	A	Hamish Peacock	Australia	75.15	79.37	78.99	79.37	
19	B	Rolands Štrobinders	Latvia	79.11	76.88	x	79.11	
20	A	Jakub Vadlejch	Czech Republic	73.47	78.95	x	78.95	
21	B	Marcin Krukowski	Poland	78.91	77.11	78.91	78.91	
22	A	Magnus Kirt	Estonia	74.73	78.84	77.08	78.84	
23	A	Stuart Farquhar	New Zealand	78.30	x	77.53	78.30	
24	A	Riley Dolezal	United States	x	73.41	77.64	77.64	
25	A	Dmitriy Tarabin	Russia	71.78	77.48	74.82	77.48	
26	A	Keshorn Walcott	Trinidad and Tobago	x	75.16	76.83	76.83	
27	B	Huang Shih-feng	Chinese Taipei	x	75.72	x	75.72	
28	A	Rocco van Rooyen	South Africa	70.38	75.55	x	75.55	
29	B	Sean Furey	United States	x	72.64	75.01	75.01	
30	B	Petr Frydrych	Czech Republic	73.77	74.24	x	74.24	
31	A	Sam Crouser	United States	70.47	x	73.88	73.88	
32	B	Valeriy Iordan	Russia	73.22	x	73.43	73.43	
33	A	Patrik Žeňúch	Slovakia	69.31	x	r	69.31	

=== Final ===
The final was started at 19:05.

Rank	Name	Nationality	#1	#2	#3	#4	#5	#6	Mark	Notes
1st place, gold medalist(s)	Julius Yego	Kenya	x	82.42	92.72	–	–	x	92.72	WL, AR
2nd place, silver medalist(s)	Ihab El-Sayed	Egypt	86.07	88.99	x	x	x	x	88.99	SB
3rd place, bronze medalist(s)	Tero Pitkämäki	Finland	83.45	85.03	85.08	87.64	84.49	87.34	87.64	
4	Thomas Röhler	Germany	86.68	86.03	86.77	87.18	84.00	87.41	87.41	
5	Antti Ruuskanen	Finland	76.24	81.29	87.12	80.63	84.30	x	87.12	
6	Andreas Hofmann	Germany	79.38	77.33	84.85	82.43	x	86.01	86.01	
7	Johannes Vetter	Germany	83.79	81.98	80.28	x	79.43	x	83.79	
8	Vítězslav Veselý	Czech Republic	78.38	x	83.13	81.45	82.98	x	83.13	
9	Ryohei Arai	Japan	80.81	83.07	x				83.07	
10	Braian Toledo	Argentina	78.27	78.30	80.27				80.27	
11	Kim Amb	Sweden	77.38	75.77	78.51				78.51	
12	Risto Mätas	Estonia	75.79	70.10	76.79				76.79	
