= Tanel Laanmäe =

Estonian javelin thrower (born 1989)

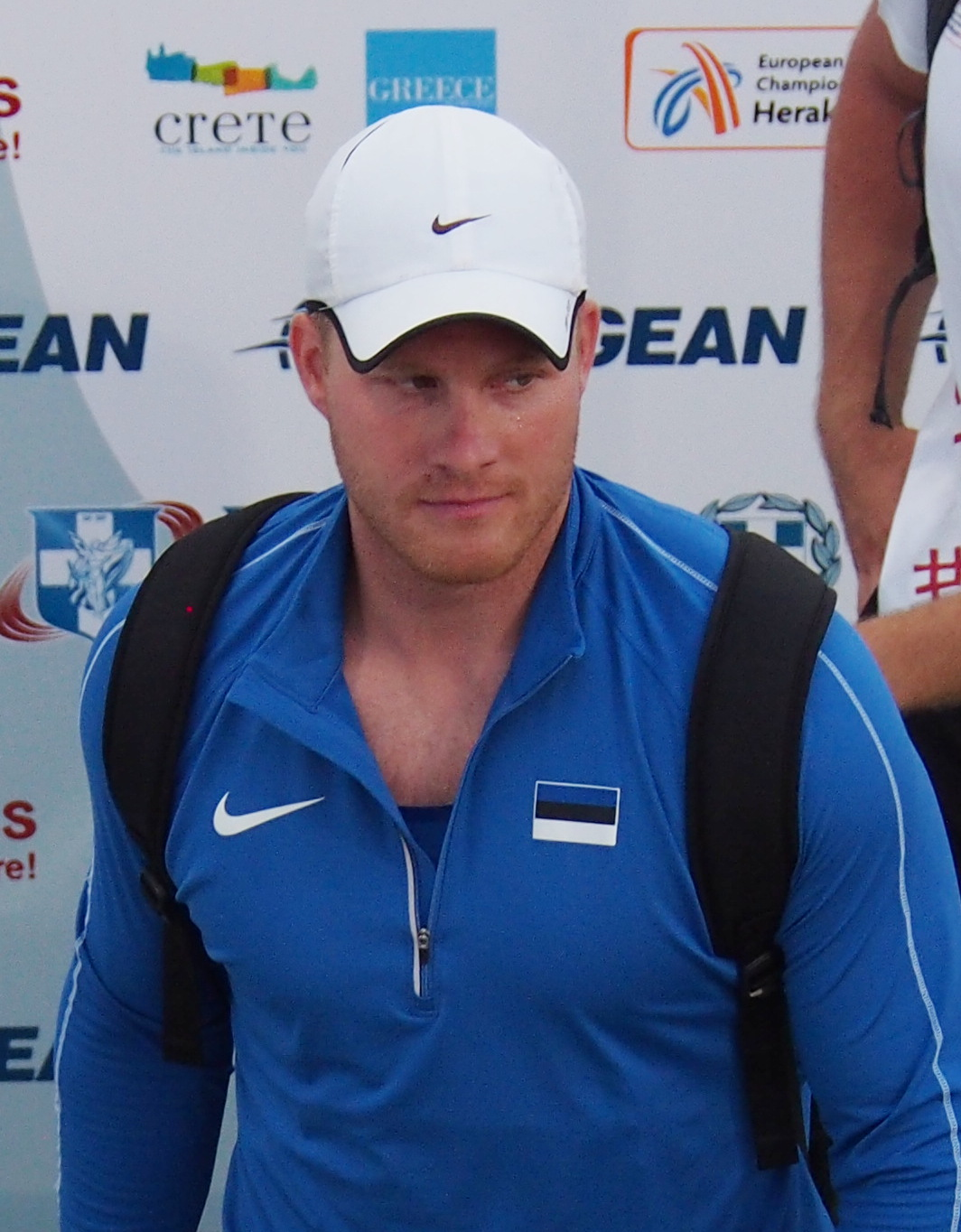
- Laanmäe at the 2015 European Team Championships

Personal information
- Born: 29 September 1989 (age 36) Valga County, then part of Estonian SSR, Soviet Union
- Education: Tallinn University
- Height: 1.83 m (6 ft 0 in)
- Weight: 82 kg (181 lb)

Sport
- Sport: Track and field
- Event: Javelin throw
- Club: Viraaz

Achievements and titles
- Personal best: 85.04 m (2016)

Tanel Laanmäe (born 29 September 1989) is an Estonian track and field athlete who competes in the javelin throw. He won the gold medal at the 2015 Summer Universiade. He has also represented his country at the 2009, 2015 and 2017 World Championships.

His personal best in the event, set in 2016, is 85.04 m.

== International competitions ==
Year	Competition	Venue	Position	Result
Representing Estonia
2006	World Junior Championships	Beijing, China	29th (q)	62.07 m
2007	European Junior Championships	Hengelo, Netherlands	7th	70.33 m
2008	World Junior Championships	Bydgoszcz, Poland	9th	68.88 m
2009	European U23 Championships	Kaunas, Lithuania	21st (q)	68.35 m
2009	World Championships	Berlin, Germany	–	NM
2011	European U23 Championships	Ostrava, Czech Republic	8th	73.20 m
2012	European Championships	Helsinki, Finland	24th (q)	71.87 m
2014	European Championships	Zürich, Switzerland	18th (q)	75.29 m
2015	Universiade	Gwangju, South Korea	1st	81.71 m
2015	World Championships	Beijing, China	13th (q)	80.65 m
2016	European Championships	Amsterdam, Netherlands	15th (q)	80.46 m
2016	Olympic Games	Rio de Janeiro, Brazil	18th (q)	80.45 m
2017	World Championships	London, United Kingdom	25th (q)	76.41 m
2018	European Championships	Berlin, Germany	15th (q)	77.21 m

== Seasonal bests by year ==
- 2006 – 69.37
- 2007 – 76.35
- 2008 – 75.93
- 2009 – 81.96
- 2010 – 77.93
- 2011 – 78.18
- 2012 – 80.75
- 2013 – 81.05
- 2014 – 81.16
- 2015 – 83.82
- 2016 – 85.04
- 2017 – 82.58
