= Risto Mätas =

Estonian javelin thrower

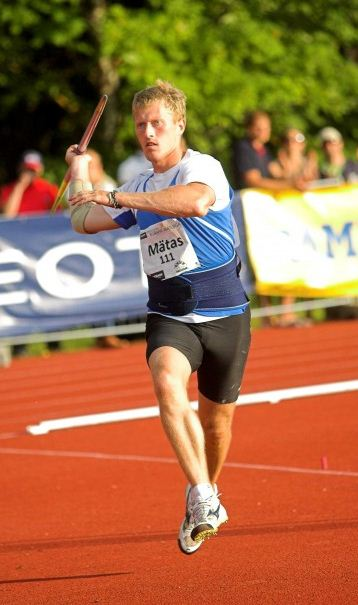
- Mätas in 2011

Personal information
- Born: 30 April 1984 (age 42) Pärsti, then part of Estonian SSR, Soviet Union
- Height: 1.89 m (6 ft 2 1/2 in)
- Weight: 92 kg (203 lb)

Sport
- Country: Estonia
- Sport: Track and field
- Event: Javelin throw

Achievements and titles
- Personal best: 83.48 m (2013)
- Updated on 31 August 2013

Risto Mätas (born 30 April 1984) is a retired Estonian track and field athlete who competed in the javelin throw. His personal best throw is 83.48 m, achieved in August 2013 in Kohila.

== Achievements ==
Year	Competition	Venue	Position	Result
Representing Estonia
2003	European Junior Championships	Tampere, Finland	12th	61.18 m
2005	Universiade	İzmir, Turkey	14th (q)	70.52 m
2006	European Championships	Gothenburg, Sweden	19th (q)	74.58 m
2007	Universiade	Bangkok, Thailand	6th	77.29 m
2011	Universiade	Shenzhen, China	4th	78.99 m
2012	European Championships	Helsinki, Finland	10th	75.85 m
2012	Olympic Games	London, United Kingdom	21st (q)	78.56 m
2013	European Cup Winter Throwing	Castellón, Spain	3rd	79.10 m
2013	World Championships	Moscow, Russia	8th	80.03 m
2014	European Cup Winter Throwing	Leiria, Portugal	3rd	80.58 m
2014	European Championships	Zürich, Switzerland	6th	80.73 m
2015	World Championships	Beijing, China	12th	76.79 m
2016	European Championships	Amsterdam, Netherlands	4th	82.03 m
2016	Olympic Games	Rio de Janeiro, Brazil	22nd (q)	79.40 m

== Seasonal bests by year ==
- 2005 – 79.68
- 2006 – 80.53
- 2007 – 77.29
- 2008 – 79.38
- 2009 – 73.56
- 2011 – 81.56
- 2012 – 82.10
- 2013 – 83.48
- 2014 – 80.73
- 2015 – 82.06
- 2016 – 83.09
