= Júlio César de Oliveira =

Brazilian javelin thrower

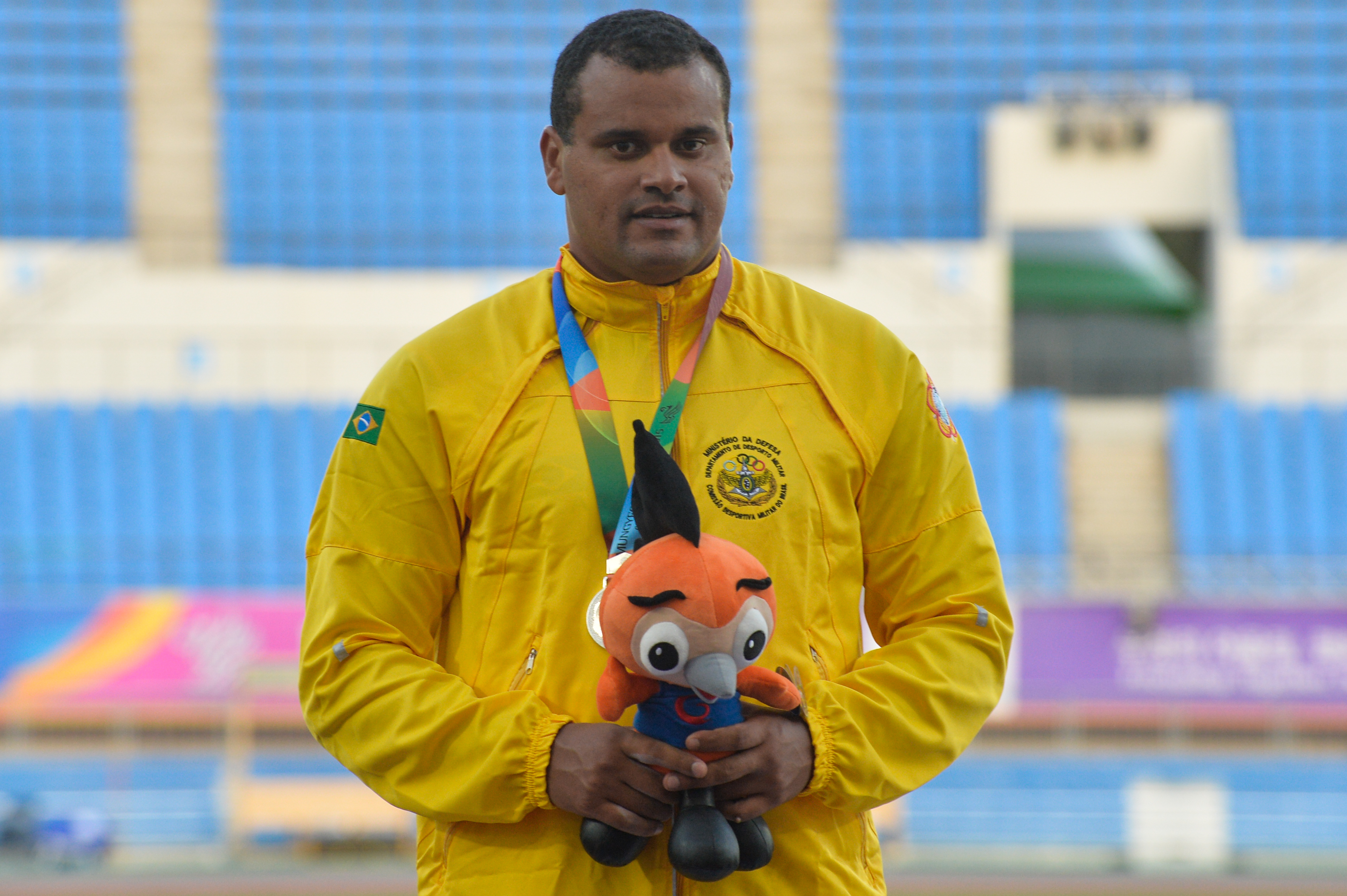
- Júlio César de Oliveira at the 2015 Military World Games

Personal information
- Full name: Júlio César Miranda de Oliveira
- Born: 4 February 1986 (age 40) Paranavaí, Paraná, Brazil
- Height: 1.85 m (6 ft 1 in)
- Weight: 100 kg (220 lb)

Sport
- Country: Brazil
- Sport: Athletics
- Event: Javelin throw
- Club: BM&F Bovespa
- Coached by: João Paulo Alves da Cunha
Medal record
Men's athletics
Representing Brazil
Pan American Games
Bronze medal – third place	2015 Toronto	Javelin throw
Military World Games
Silver medal – second place	2015 Mungyeong	Javelin throw
World Youth Championships
Gold medal – first place	2003 Sherbrooke	Javelin
- Updated on 7 October 2015

Júlio César Miranda de Oliveira (born 4 February 1986) is a Brazilian athlete specialising in the javelin throw. He won the gold medal at the 2003 World Youth Championships. In addition, he has won multiple medals at the regional level.

His personal best of 83.67 metres, set in 2015, is the current national record.

== Personal bests ==
- Discus throw (1.500 kg): 56.17 m – São Caetano do Sul, Brazil, 25 May 2003
- Javelin throw: 83.67 m – São Bernardo do Campo, Brazil, 11 July 2015
- Javelin throw (700g): 81.16 m – Sherbrooke, Canada, 11 July 2003

== Competition record ==
Year	Competition	Venue	Position	Event	Notes
Representing Brazil
2000	South American Youth Championships	Bogotá, Colombia	1st	Javelin throw (700 g)	66.10 m
2002	World Junior Championships	Kingston Jamaica	21st (q)	Javelin throw	63.72 m
2002	South American Junior Championships / South American Games	Belém, Brazil	1st	Javelin throw	63.49 m
2002	South American Youth Championships	Asunción, Paraguay	1st	Javelin throw (700 g)	61.68 m
2003	South American Junior Championships	Guayaquil, Ecuador	1st	Javelin throw	70.94 m
2003	World Youth Championships	Sherbrooke, Canada	12th	Discus throw (1.5 kg)	52.39 m
2003	World Youth Championships	Sherbrooke, Canada	1st	Javelin throw (700 g)	81.16 m
2003	Pan American Junior Championships	Bridgetown, Barbados	1st	Javelin throw	68.42 m
2004	South American U23 Championships	Barquisimeto, Venezuela	2nd	Javelin throw	71.49 m
2004	World Junior Championships	Grosseto, Italy	3rd	Javelin throw	73.86 m
2005	South American Championships	Cali, Colombia	2nd	Javelin throw	73.60 m
2005	Pan American Junior Championships	Windsor, Canada	7th	Discus throw (1.75 kg)	51.07 m
2005	Pan American Junior Championships	Windsor, Canada	1st	Javelin throw	72.35 m
2005	South American Junior Championships	Rosario, Argentina	1st	Javelin throw	71.46 m
2006	Ibero-American Championships	Ponce, Puerto Rico	1st	Javelin throw	78.91 m
2006	South American U23 Championships / South American Games	Buenos Aires, Argentina	2nd	Javelin throw	72.10 m
2007	South American Championships	São Paulo, Brazil	3rd	Javelin throw	74.56 m
2007	Pan American Games	Rio de Janeiro, Brazil	8th	Javelin throw	67.92 m
2008	Ibero-American Championships	Iquique, Chile	3rd^{*}	Javelin throw	71.54 m
2008	South American U23 Championships	Lima, Peru	3rd	Javelin throw	66.46 m
2009	South American Championships	Lima, Peru	3rd	Javelin throw	73.51 m
2009	World Championships	Berlin, Germany	42nd (q)	Javelin throw	68.49 m
2011	South American Championships	Buenos Aires, Argentina	5th	Javelin throw	70.94 m
2011	Pan American Games	Guadalajara, Mexico	6th	Javelin throw	76.24 m
2012	Ibero-American Championships	Barquisimeto, Venezuela	6th	Javelin throw	70.78 m
2013	South American Championships	Cartagena, Colombia	4th	Javelin throw	75.20 m
2014	South American Games	Santiago, Chile	2nd	Javelin throw	75.98 m
2014	Ibero-American Championships	São Paulo, Brazil	2nd	Javelin throw	78.04 m
2014	Pan American Sports Festival	Mexico City, Mexico	1st	Javelin throw	79.10m A
2015	South American Championships	Lima, Peru	1st	Javelin throw	81.22 m
2015	Pan American Games	Toronto, Canada	3rd	Javelin throw	80.94 m
2015	World Championships	Beijing, China	15th (q)	Javelin throw	79.81 m
2015	Military World Games	Mungyeong, South Korea	2nd	Javelin throw	78.62 m
2016	Ibero-American Championships	Rio de Janeiro, Brazil	3rd	Javelin throw	79.02 m
2016	Olympic Games	Rio de Janeiro, Brazil	16th (q)	Javelin throw	80.49 m

^{*}: At the 2008 Ibero-American Championships, Júlio César de Oliveira was initially 4th, but Colombian Noraldo Palacios was disqualified because of doping violations.

== Seasonal bests by year ==
- 2001 – 61.29
- 2002 – 69.52
- 2003 – 72.52
- 2004 – 74.42
- 2005 – 76.81
- 2006 – 78.91
- 2007 – 77.65
- 2008 – 76.65
- 2009 – 80.05
- 2011 – 77.70
- 2012 – 75.66
- 2013 – 77.23
- 2014 – 79.10
- 2015 – 83.67 NR
- 2016 – 81.56
