= Kim Amb =

Swedish javelin thrower (born 1990)

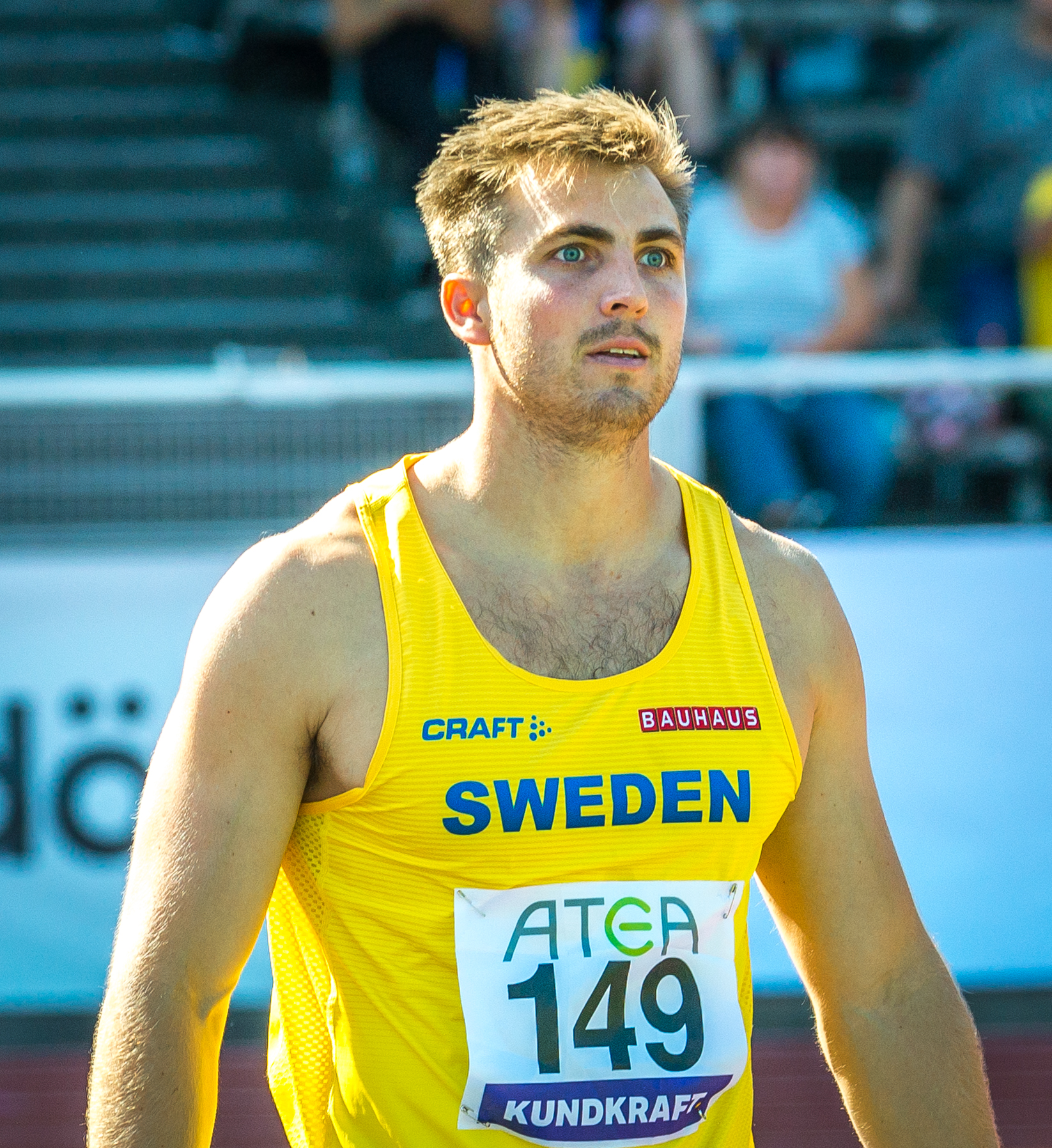
- Amb in 2019

Personal information
- Born: 31 July 1990 (age 36) Solna Municipality, Sweden
- Height: 1.80 m (5 ft 11 in)
- Weight: 86 kg (190 lb)

Sport
- Country: Sweden
- Sport: Athletics
- Event: Javelin

Achievements and titles
- Personal bests: 86.49 m (Zweibrücken, 2020)
- Updated on 5 August 2021

Kim Amb (born 31 July 1990) is a Swedish track and field athlete who competes in the javelin throw. His personal best is 86.49 m, set in 2020. He finished in seventh place at the 2012 European Championships and 18th in the 2012 Summer Olympics. In 2016, he finished in 17th at the Olympic Games, and in 7th at the European Championships. In 2019, he finished in 8th at the World Championships.

== Competition record ==
Year	Competition	Venue	Position	Notes
Representing Sweden
2008	World Junior Championships	Bydgoszcz, Poland	13th (q)	67.59 m
2011	European U23 Championships	Ostrava, Czech Republic	4th	79.48 m
2012	European Championships	Helsinki, Finland	7th	79.03 m
2012	Olympic Games	London, United Kingdom	18th (q)	78.94 m
2013	World Championships	Moscow, Russia	10th	78.91 m
2014	European Championships	Zürich, Switzerland	–	NM
2015	World Championships	Beijing, China	11th	78.51 m
2016	European Championships	Amsterdam, Netherlands	7th	79.36 m
2016	Olympic Games	Rio de Janeiro, Brazil	17th (q)	80.49 m
2019	World Championships	Doha, Qatar	8th	80.42 m
2021	Olympic Games	Tokyo, Japan	11th	79.69 m

== Seasonal bests by year ==
- 2008 - 67.59
- 2010 - 77.81
- 2011 - 80.09
- 2012 - 81.84
- 2013 - 84.61
- 2014 - 84.14
- 2015 - 82.40
- 2016 - 84.50
- 2019 - 86.03
- 2020 - 86.49
- 2021 - 82.40
