= Joshua Robinson =

Australian javelin thrower (born 1985)

Personal information
- Born: 4 October 1985 (age 40) Brisbane, Australia
- Education: Villanova College; University of Queensland
- Height: 1.87 m (6 ft 2 in)
- Weight: 92 kg (203 lb)

Sport
- Sport: Athletics
- Event: Javelin throw

Joshua Robinson (born 4 October 1985) is an Australian athlete specialising in the javelin throw. He represented his country at the 2016 Summer Olympics in Rio de Janeiro, narrowly missing the final. He earlier competed at the 2007 World Championships but did not qualify for the final.

His personal best in the javelin throw is 85.11 metres set in Perth in 2016.

== International competitions ==
Year	Competition	Venue	Position	Event	Notes
Representing Australia
2001	World Youth Championships	Debrecen, Hungary	5th	Javelin throw (700 g)	66.64 m
2002	World Junior Championships	Kingston, Jamaica	20th (q)	Javelin throw	63.97 m
2004	World Junior Championships	Grosseto, Italy	4th	Javelin throw	73.76 m
2007	Universiade	Bangkok, Thailand	5th	Javelin throw	77.86 m
2007	World Championships	Osaka, Japan	17th (q)	Javelin throw	78.48 m
2009	Universiade	Belgrade, Serbia	15th (q)	Javelin throw	70.75 m
2014	Commonwealth Games	Glasgow, United Kingdom	4th	Javelin throw	79.95 m
2014	Continental Cup	Marrakesh, Morocco	6th	Javelin throw	78.58 m (Note: Representing Asia-Pacific)
2016	Olympic Games	Rio de Janeiro, Brazil	13th (q)	Javelin throw	80.84 m
