= Valeriy Iordan =

Russian javelin thrower (born 1992)

Personal information
- Born: 14 February 1992 (age 34)

Sport
- Country: Russia
- Sport: Men's athletics
- Event: Javelin throw

Valeriy Vladimirovich Iordan (Russian: Валерий Владимирович Иордан; born 14 February 1992) is a Russian athlete. Iordan won the silver medal at 2012 European Championships in Helsinki in Javelin Throw with result 83.23m, which is athlete's personal best.

== International competitions ==
Year	Competition	Venue	Position	Event	Notes
2009	World Youth Championships	Brixen, Italy	9th	Javelin (700 g)	69.14 m
2009	European Youth Olympics	Tampere, Finland	1st	Javelin (700 g)	75.59 m
2011	European Cup Winter Throwing	Sofia, Bulgaria	3rd	Javelin	79.49 m
2011	European Junior Championships	Tallinn, Estonia	5th	Javelin	75.47 m
2012	European Championships	Helsinki, Finland	2nd	Javelin	83.23 m
2013	Universiade	Kazan, Russia	11th	Javelin	73.49 m
2013	World Championships	Moscow, Russia	26th (q)	Javelin	76.92 m
2014	European Championships	Zürich, Switzerland	7th	Javelin	78.40 m
2015	World Championships	Beijing, China	32nd (q)	Javelin	73.43 m

== Seasonal bests by year ==
- 2010 – 74.86
- 2011 – 80.15
- 2012 – 83.23
- 2013 – 83.56
- 2014 – 82.05
- 2015 – 83.00
