= Bartosz Osewski =

Polish javelin thrower

Bartosz Osewski (born 20 March 1991 in Gdańsk) is a Polish javelin thrower. He competed in the javelin throw at the 2012 Summer Olympics and placed 42nd with a mark of 71.19 metres.

Personal best: 83.89 (2012) – Polish U23 record.
