= Athletics at the 2011 Pan American Games – Men's javelin throw =

Men's javelin throw at the 2011 Pan American Games
- Venue: Telmex Athletics Stadium
- Dates: October 28
- Competitors: 15 from 12 nations

Medalists
Gold medal	Guillermo Martínez	Cuba
Silver medal	Cyrus Hostetler	United States
Bronze medal	Braian Toledo	Argentina

The men's javelin throw event of the athletics events at the 2011 Pan American Games was held the 28 of October at the Telmex Athletics Stadium. The defending Pan American Games champion is Guillermo Martínez of the Cuba.

== Records ==
Prior to this competition, the existing world and Pan American Games records were as follows:

World record	Jan Železný (CZE)	98.48	Jena, Germany	May 25, 1996
Pan American Games record	Emeterio González (CUB)	81.72	Santo Domingo, Dominican Republic	August 6, 2003

== Qualification ==
Each National Olympic Committee (NOC) was able to enter up to two entrants providing they had met the minimum standard (71.00) in the qualifying period (January 1, 2010 to September 14, 2011).

== Schedule ==
Date	Time	Round
October 28, 2011	17:30	Final

== Results ==
All distances shown are in meters:centimeters

KEY:	q	Fastest non-qualifiers	Q	Qualified	NR	National record	PB	Personal best	SB	Seasonal best

=== Final ===
The final was held on October 28.

Rank	Athlete	Nationality	#1	#2	#3	#4	#5	#6	Result	Notes
1st place, gold medalist(s)	Guillermo Martínez	Cuba	87.20	x	–	–	–	–	87.20	PR
2nd place, silver medalist(s)	Cyrus Hostetler	United States	77.97	x	75.24	79.20	77.17	82.24	82.24	SB
3rd place, bronze medalist(s)	Braian Toledo	Argentina	76.50	79.53	76.12	x	73.54	76.71	79.53	PB
4	Sean Furey	United States	74.22	72.94	74.83	x	77.05	x	77.05	
5	Víctor Fatecha	Paraguay	73.02	76.92	x	73.51	74.10	x	76.92	SB
6	Júlio César de Oliveira	Brazil	75.61	76.24	73.74	x	70.12	75.03	76.24	
7	Keshorn Walcott	Trinidad and Tobago	72.92	x	75.77	67.65	–	70.08	75.77	PB
8	Juan José Méndez	Mexico	74.18	x	66.50	69.39	68.68	x	74.18	
9	Michel Miranda	Cuba	73.91	x	x				73.91	
10	Arley Ibargüen	Colombia	72.93	x	72.46				72.93	
11	Felipe Ortiz	Puerto Rico	67.93	67.71	63.23				67.93	
12	José Lagunes	Mexico	62.43	64.59	64.70				64.70	
13	Justin Cummins	Barbados	x	64.34	63.91				64.34	
14	Omar Jones	British Virgin Islands	54.98	60.24	x				60.24	
	Ignacio Guerra	Chile	x	x	x				NM	
