= Spyridon Lebesis =

Greek javelin thrower

Personal information
- Born: May 30, 1987 (age 39)
- Height: 1.9 m (6 ft 3 in)
- Weight: 91 kg (201 lb)

Sport
- Country: Greece
- Sport: Athletics
- Event: Javelin
Medal record
Men's Athletics
Representing Greece
Mediterranean Games
Bronze medal – third place	Mersin 2013	Javelin
- Updated on 11 August 2012

Spyridon Lebesis (Greek: Σπυρίδων Λεμπέσης, born May 30, 1987, in Mavromati, Boeotia) is a Greek javelin thrower.

His personal best is 83.02 meters, achieved in Nicosia in May 2012. This performance ranks him third among Greek javelin throwers, behind Kostas Gatsioudis and Ioannis Kiriazis.

Lebesis scored 82.40 in the qualification round of the London Summer Olympic, second place to the World Champion Andreas Thorkildsen of Norway.

== Achievements ==
Year	Competition	Venue	Position	Event	Notes
Representing Greece
2009	Mediterranean Games	Pescara, Italy	2nd	Javelin throw	78.66 m (PB)
2009	European U23 Championships	Kaunas, Lithuania	3rd	Javelin throw	79.37 m (PB)
2011	World Championships	Daegu, South Korea	30th (q)	Javelin throw	73.35 m
2012	Olympic Games	London, United Kingdom	6th	Javelin throw	81.91 m
2013	Mediterranean Games	Mersin, Turkey	3rd	Javelin throw	78.53 m
2014	European Championships	Zürich, Switzerland	24th (q)	Javelin throw	74.14 m

== Seasonal bests by year ==
- 2006 – 72.50
- 2007 – 75.45
- 2008 – 76.97
- 2009 – 80.95
- 2010 – 82.90
- 2011 – 81.12
- 2012 – 83.02
- 2013 – 79.97
- 2014 – 80.64
