= Paweł Rakoczy =

Polish javelin thrower

Paweł Rakoczy (born 15 May 1987 in Złotoryja) is a Polish javelin thrower. He competed in the 2012 European Athletics Championships and in the javelin throw at the 2012 Summer Olympics, placing 28th with a mark of 77.36 metres. In 2008 he was warned after testing positive for Sibutramine.

Rakoczy's personal best is 84.99 metres, achieved in 2012.

== Seasonal bests by year ==
- 2005 - 68.84
- 2006 - 72.36
- 2008 - 77.71
- 2009 - 79.73
- 2010 - 78.13
- 2011 - 82.53
- 2012 - 84.99
- 2013 - 74.88
- 2014 - 74.29
