= Vítězslav Veselý =

Czech javelin thrower

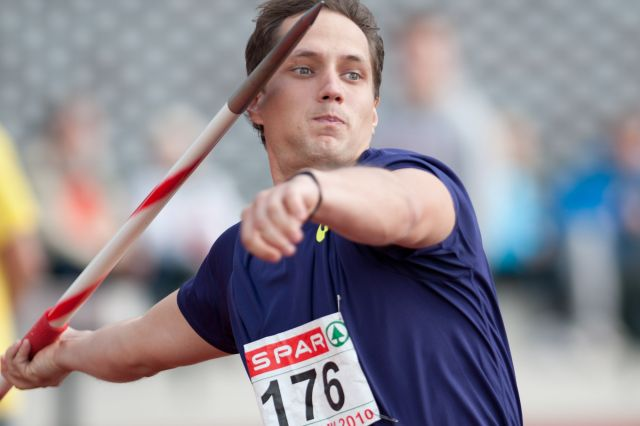

Personal information
- Nationality: Czech
- Born: 27 February 1983 (age 43) Hodonín, Czechoslovakia
- Height: 1.86 m (6 ft 1 in)
- Weight: 94 kg (207 lb; 14.8 st)

Sport
- Country: Czech Republic
- Sport: Track and field
- Event: Javelin throw
- Club: Dukla Praha
- Turned pro: 2002
- Coached by: Jan Železný
- Retired: 2024

Achievements and titles
- Personal best: Javelin throw: 88.34 (2012)
Medal record
Men's athletics
Representing Czech Republic
Olympic Games
Bronze medal – third place	2012 London	Javelin throw
Bronze medal – third place	2020 Tokyo	Javelin throw
World Championships
Gold medal – first place	2013 Moscow	Javelin throw
European Championships
Gold medal – first place	2012 Helsinki	Javelin throw
Silver medal – second place	2014 Zurich	Javelin throw
Silver medal – second place	2016 Amsterdam	Javelin throw
Continental Cup
Silver medal – second place	2014 Marrakesh	Javelin throw

Vítězslav Veselý (Czech pronunciation: [ˈviːcɛslav ˈvɛsɛliː]; born 27 February 1983) is a Czech javelin thrower. He won two bronze medals at the Olympic games, in 2012 and 2020.

== Career ==
He finished ninth at the 2002 World Junior Championships. He threw a personal best throw of 81.20 metres during the qualifying round at the 2008 Olympic Games and finished twelfth in the final. He was less successful at his first World Championships in Athletics the following year, failing to make the final with a throw of 75.76 m.

Veselý improved his personal best by more than five metres at a meeting in Olomouc in May 2010, throwing a world leading mark of 86.45 m. He was ninth at the 2010 European Athletics Championships that year. He came close to a major medal with a fourth-place finish at the 2011 World Championships in Athletics. He had his second best ever throw at the Shanghai 2012 Diamond League meet, winning with a mark of 85.40 m. At the 2012 Olympic Games, Veselý threw a new personal best of 88.34 m to improve his world lead; in the final, however, his last throw of 83.34 m was only good enough for 4th place. In 2017, following the disqualification of Oleksandr Pyatnytsya due to doping, Veselý was awarded the bronze medal.

In 2013 Veselý won the World Championships with a mark of 87.17 meters, only 10 cm ahead of Tero Pitkämäki. With this result he became the second Czech world champion in men's javelin throw beside Jan Železný.

During 2014 he wasn't able to defend his title at the Europeans: Veselý finished second with 84.79 m behind Antti Ruuskanen, who was in his best form in the final, reaching 88.01 m at the third round.

== Achievements ==
Year	Competition	Venue	Position	Notes
2002	World Junior Championships	Kingston, Jamaica	9th	68.76 m
2008	Olympic Games	Beijing, China	12th	76.76 m
2009	World Championships	Berlin, Germany	28th (q)	75.76 m
2010	European Championships	Barcelona, Spain	9th	77.83 m
2011	World Championships	Daegu, South Korea	4th	84.11 m
2012	European Championships	Helsinki, Finland	1st	83.72 m
2012	Olympic Games	London, United Kingdom	3rd	83.34 m
2013	World Championships	Moscow, Russia	1st	87.17 m
2014	European Championships	Zurich, Switzerland	2nd	84.79 m
2015	World Championships	Beijing, China	8th	83.13 m
2016	European Championships	Amsterdam, Netherlands	2nd	83.59 m
2016	Olympic Games	Rio de Janeiro, Brazil	7th	82.51 m
2017	World Championships	London, United Kingdom	26th (q)	75.50 m
2019	World Championships	Doha, Qatar	–	DNS
2021	Olympic Games	Tokyo, Japan	3rd	85.44 m
2022	European Championships	Munich, Germany	4th	84.36 m

== Seasonal bests by year ==
- 2002 – 73.22
- 2006 – 75.98
- 2007 – 79.45
- 2008 – 81.20
- 2009 – 80.35
- 2010 – 86.45
- 2011 – 84.11
- 2012 – 88.34
- 2013 – 87.58
- 2014 – 87.38
- 2015 – 88.18
- 2016 – 84.82
- 2017 – 82.29
- 2018 – 82.30
- 2019 – 82.85
- 2020 – 83.03
- 2021 – 85.44
- 2022 – 85.97
