= Qin Qiang (athlete) =

Chinese javelin thrower

Personal information
- Born: 18 April 1983 (age 43)
- Height: 1.84 m (6 ft 1/2 in)
- Weight: 105 kg (231 lb)

Sport
- Country: China
- Sport: Athletics
- Event: Javelin
- Updated on 11 August 2012

Qin Qiang (Chinese: 秦强; pinyin: Qín Qiáng) is a Chinese track and field athlete who specialises in the javelin throw.

== See also ==
- China at the 2012 Summer Olympics – Athletics
  - Athletics at the 2012 Summer Olympics – Men's javelin throw
