= Cyrus Hostetler =

American javelin thrower (born 1986)

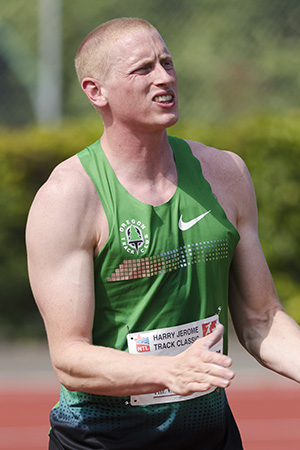

Personal information
- Nationality: United States
- Born: August 8, 1986 (age 39)
- Height: 6 ft 2 in (1.88 m)
- Weight: 215 lb (98 kg)

Sport
- Sport: Track and field
- Event: Javelin throw
- College team: Oregon
- Coached by: Christina Scherwin

Achievements and titles
- Personal best: Javelin: 83.83m (275')
Medal record
Men's athletics
Representing the United States
Pan American Games
Silver medal – second place	2011 Guadalajara	Javelin

Cyrus Hostetler (born August 8, 1986) is an American javelin thrower who competed at the 2012 Summer Olympics and 2016 Summer Olympics.

== High school ==
At Newberg High School, Cyrus lettered in football, basketball, and baseball. He did not pick up a javelin until his senior year of high school. At the PAC-9 District Meet, Cyrus took first in javelin with a throw of 60.7 meters (199'2" feet) and also placed fifth in triple jump. He also took third place at the Oregon State Meet, with a throw of 61.49 meters (201'5" feet). Cyrus finished the year at the 2005 USA Junior Nationals with a personal best of 62.55 meters (205'2" feet) and taking fifth place.

== College career ==
=== Weber State University ===
In the fall and winter seasons, Cyrus worked on his weight throw and hammer throw. After straining his elbow at the Oregon Preview, Cyrus tore his ulnar collateral ligament in a meet at BYU four weeks later. After the season, Cyrus asked to be released, so he could compete for another school the next year.

=== Lane Community College ===
At Lane Community College, Cyrus played on the basketball team as well as the track and field team. In his last meet of the 2007 season, Cyrus threw a personal best of 63.56 meters (208'6" feet), placing second at the NWAACC championships.

Cyrus competed at the NWAACC conference decathlon in 2008, finishing fourth with 5,995 points. At the NWAACC championships, Cyrus threw a personal best in the javelin with a throw of 73.63 meters (241'7" feet), which qualified him for the 2008 U.S. Olympic Trials. He placed eighteenth in javelin at the U.S. Olympic Trials.

=== University of Oregon ===
In his first year at the University of Oregon, Cyrus threw a personal best in javelin with a throw of 81.16 meters (272'10" feet). He won the Pac-10 Conference championship and placed fourth in the 2009 NCAA championships. He also placed fourth at the 2009 USA Championships. Two weeks later, Cyrus tore his ACL, MCL and medial meniscus playing basketball.

In his senior year of college, Cyrus won his second straight Pac-10 Conference javelin championship. He placed tenth at the 2010 NCAA championships. He placed ninth in the 2010 USA Championships, after once again tearing his ACL, MCL, and medial meniscus on his third throw.

== Professional career ==
Cyrus took third place in javelin at the 2011 USA Championships in Eugene, Oregon. He also competed at the 2011 Toronto International Track & Field Games, placing second throwing 77.72 meters (255' feet). At the 2011 Pan American Games, Cyrus earned the silver medal with a season-best throw of 82.24 meters (269'10" feet), also achieving the 2012 Summer Olympics A standard. He placed fifth in javelin at the U.S. Olympic trials, but was one of the three javelin throwers who had the Olympic A standard. In the Javelin Throw at the 2012 Summer Olympics, Cyrus placed thirty-second in the qualifying with a throw of 75.76 meters.

== Seasonal bests by year ==
- 2006 - 62.55
- 2007 - 63.56
- 2008 - 77.19
- 2009 - 83.16
- 2010 - 78.19
- 2011 - 82.24
- 2012 - 81.02
- 2013 - 74.93
- 2014 - 80.28
- 2015 - 75.72
- 2016 - 83.83 (5/21)
- 2017 - 83.12
