= Matija Kranjc =

Slovenian javelin thrower

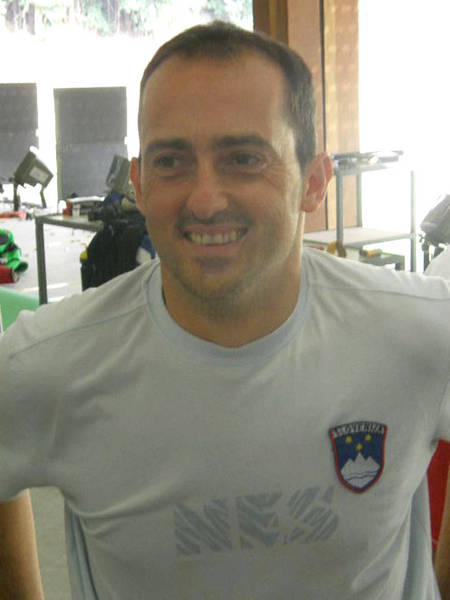
- Matija Kranjc

Personal information
- Born: 12 June 1984 (age 42)
- Height: 1.83 m (6 ft 0 in)
- Weight: 91 kg (201 lb)

Sport
- Country: Slovenia
- Sport: Track and field
- Event: Javelin throw
- Updated on 11 August 2012

Matija Kranjc (born 12 June 1984) is a Slovenian track and field athlete who competes in the javelin throw. His personal best of 81.13 metres, achieved in June 2016, is the Slovenian record.

== Achievements ==
Year	Competition	Venue	Position	Notes
Representing Slovenia
2003	European Junior Championships	Tampere, Finland	5th	68.50 m
2005	European U23 Championships	Erfurt, Germany	13th (q)	67.58 m
2007	Universiade	Bangkok, Thailand	7th	75.57 m
2008	Olympic Games	Beijing, China	31st (q)	71.00 m
2009	Mediterranean Games	Pescara, Italy	3rd	77.82 m
2011	World Championships	Daegu, South Korea	31st (q)	73.17 m
2012	European Championships	Helsinki, Finland	22nd (q)	72.49 m
2012	Olympic Games	London, United Kingdom	40th (q)	72.63 m
2013	Mediterranean Games	Mersin, Turkey	5th	76.23 m
2014	European Championships	Zürich, Switzerland	8th	78.27 m
2016	European Championships	Amsterdam, Netherlands	17th (q)	79.56 m

== Seasonal bests by year ==
- 2003 - 68.50
- 2005 - 76.04
- 2006 - 72.45
- 2007 - 78.08
- 2008 - 76.15
- 2009 - 77.82
- 2010 - 74.65
- 2011 - 79.72
- 2012 - 77.59
- 2013 - 79.15
- 2014 - 80.46
- 2015 - 78.35
- 2016 - 81.13 NR
- 2017 - 76.88
