= Dmytro Kosynskyy =

Ukrainian javelin thrower

Personal information
- Born: 31 March 1989 (age 37)

Sport
- Country: Ukraine
- Sport: Athletics
- Event: Javelin throw

Dmytro Kosynskyy (Ukrainian: Дмитро Косинський, born 31 March 1989) is a Ukrainian javelin thrower.

He failed a drug test for excess testosterone in June 2011 and was given a two-year ban from the sport.

== Achievements ==
Year	Competition	Venue	Position	Event	Notes
Representing Ukraine
2010	European Championships	Barcelona, Spain	12th	Javelin throw	73.26
2011	European U23 Championships	Ostrava, Czech Republic	DQ	Javelin throw	DQ (Doping)
2016	Olympic Games	Rio de Janeiro, Brazil	5th	Javelin throw	83.95 m

== Seasonal bests by year ==
- 2008 - 72.61
- 2009 - 75.18
- 2010 - 79.53
- 2011 - 83.39
- 2014 - 82.28
- 2015 - 79.00
- 2016 - 84.08
