= Tino Häber =

German javelin thrower

Personal information
- Born: 6 October 1982 (age 43)
- Height: 1.85 m (6 ft 1 in)
- Weight: 88 kg (194 lb)

Sport
- Country: Germany
- Sport: Athletics
- Event: Javelin
- Updated on 11 August 2012

Tino Häber (born 1982) is a German javelin thrower. He was born in Gera in Thuringia. He competed in the men's javelin throw at the 2012 Summer Olympics in London, where he qualified for the final and finished seventh after Ukraine's Oleksandr Pyatnytsya was disqualified for doping.

== Seasonal bests by year ==
- 2004 – 79.88
- 2005 – 75.79
- 2006 – 71.62
- 2007 – 80.24
- 2008 – 80.71
- 2009 – 83.46
- 2010 – 79.74
- 2011 – 79.81
- 2012 – 82.10
- 2013 – 78.78
