= Antti Ruuskanen =

Finnish javelin thrower (born 1984)

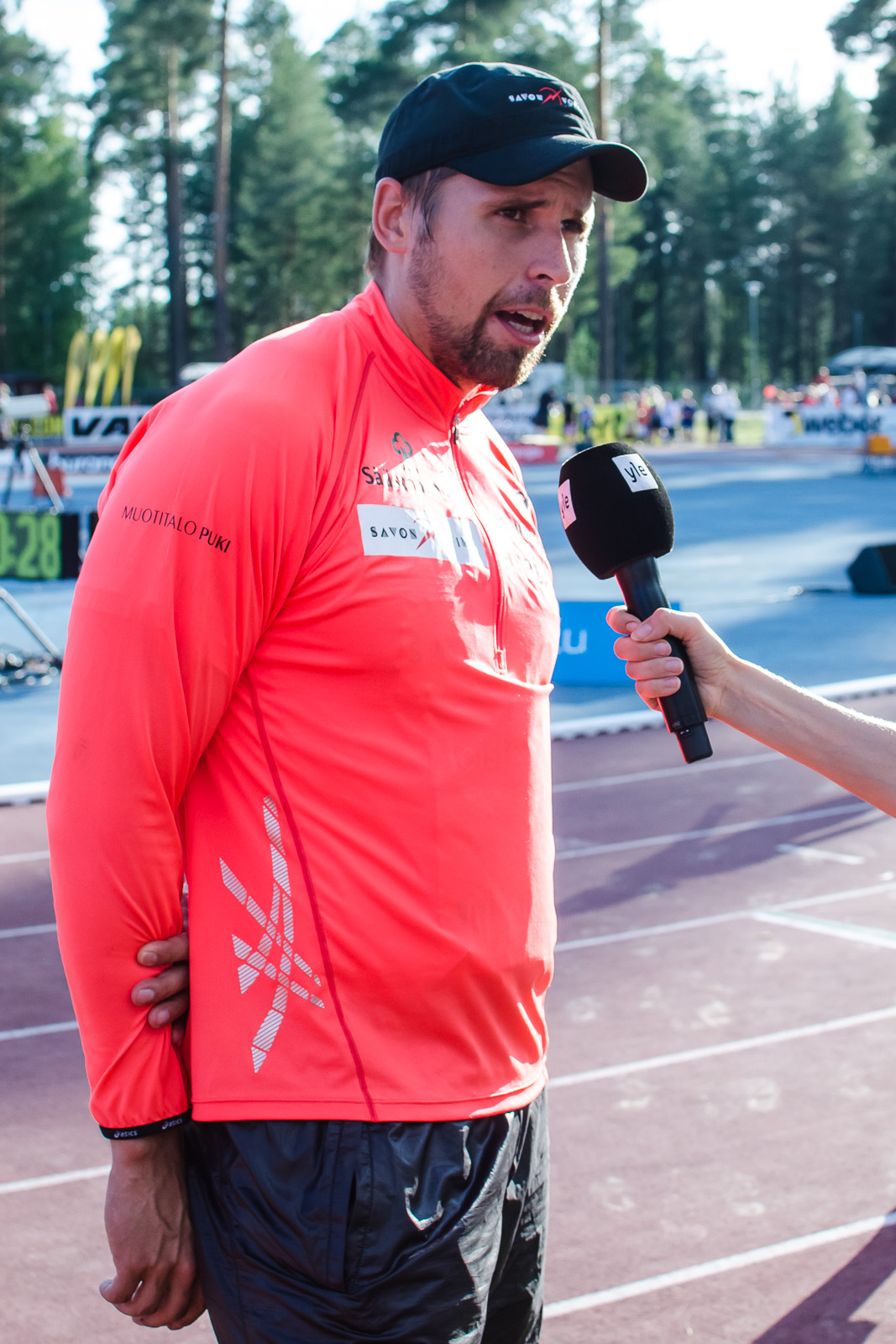
- Antti Ruuskanen at Savo Games in Lapinlahti in 2014

Personal information
- Born: Antti Hermanni Ruuskanen; 21 February 1984 (age 42) Pielavesi, North Savo, Finland
- Height: 1.89 m (6 ft 2 1/2 in)
- Weight: 86 kg (190 lb)

Sport
- Country: Finland
- Sport: Track and field
- Event: Javelin throw

Achievements and titles
- Personal best: 88.98 m (291 ft 11 in) (2015)
Medal record
Olympic Games
Silver medal – second place	2012 London	Javelin throw
European Championships
Gold medal – first place	2014 Zürich	Javelin throw
Bronze medal – third place	2016 Amsterdam	Javelin throw

Antti Hermanni Ruuskanen (born 21 February 1984) is a retired Finnish track and field athlete who competes in the javelin throw. He is a European Champion, having won gold in 2014. His personal best is 88.98 metres (291 ft 11 in), which he set in 2015.

== Career ==
Ruuskanen won the bronze medal at the 2003 European Junior Championships and the silver medal at the 2005 European U23 Championships. He was sixth at the 2009 World Championships in Berlin.

He finished third in London Olympics 2012, but after Oleksandr Pyatnytsya was disqualified as he failed a subsequent doping test, Ruuskanen moved to second place. He received his silver medal in February 2017 during a special ceremony at the 2017 World Nordic Ski Championships in Lahti from the IOC president Thomas Bach.

In 2013, he finished fifth at the World Championships in Moscow.

In 2014, he won the gold medal at the Europeans with a mark of 88.01 m (288 ft 9 in), beating Vítězslav Veselý (84.79 m (278 ft 2 in)) and Tero Pitkämäki (84.40 m (276 ft 11 in)).

In 2016, he won the bronze medal at the Europeans. He competed for Finland at the 2016 Summer Olympics where he placed 6th with a throw of 83.05 metres (272 ft 6 in). He was the flag bearer for Finland during the closing ceremony.

Ruuskanen was a substitute thrower for Finland at the 2020 Summer Olympics.

== Competition record ==
Year	Competition	Venue	Position	Notes
Representing Finland
2003	European Junior Championships	Tampere, Finland	3rd	72.87 m (239 ft 1 in)
2005	European U23 Championships	Erfurt, Germany	2nd	76.82 m (252 ft 0 in)
2009	World Championships	Berlin, Germany	6th	81.87 m (268 ft 7 in)
2011	World Championships	Daegu, South Korea	9th	79.46 m (260 ft 8 in)
2012	Olympic Games	London, United Kingdom	2nd	84.12 m (276 ft 0 in)
2013	World Championships	Moscow, Russia	5th	81.44 m (267 ft 2 in)
2014	European Championships	Zürich, Switzerland	1st	88.01 m (288 ft 9 in)
2015	World Championships	Beijing, China	5th	87.12 m (285 ft 10 in)
2016	European Championships	Amsterdam, Netherlands	3rd	82.44 m (270 ft 6 in)
2016	Olympic Games	Rio de Janeiro, Brazil	6th	83.05 m (272 ft 6 in)
2018	European Championships	Berlin, Germany	6th	81.70 m (268 ft 1 in)
2019	World Championships	Doha, Qatar	28th (q)	75.05 m (246 ft 3 in)

== Seasonal bests by year ==
- 2002 – 66.08 m (216 ft 10 in)
- 2003 – 72.87 m (239 ft 1 in)
- 2004 – 75.84 m (248 ft 10 in)
- 2005 – 79.75 m (261 ft 8 in)
- 2006 – 84.10 m (275 ft 11 in)
- 2007 – 82.71 m (271 ft 4 in)
- 2008 – 87.33 m (286 ft 6 in)
- 2009 – 85.39 m (280 ft 2 in)
- 2010 – 83.45 m (273 ft 9 in)
- 2011 – 82.29 m (270 ft 0 in)
- 2012 – 87.79 m (288 ft 0 in)
- 2013 – 85.70 m (281 ft 2 in)
- 2014 – 88.01 m (288 ft 9 in)
- 2015 – 88.98 m (291 ft 11 in)
- 2016 – 88.23 m (289 ft 6 in)
