= Ari Mannio =

Finnish javelin thrower (born 1987)

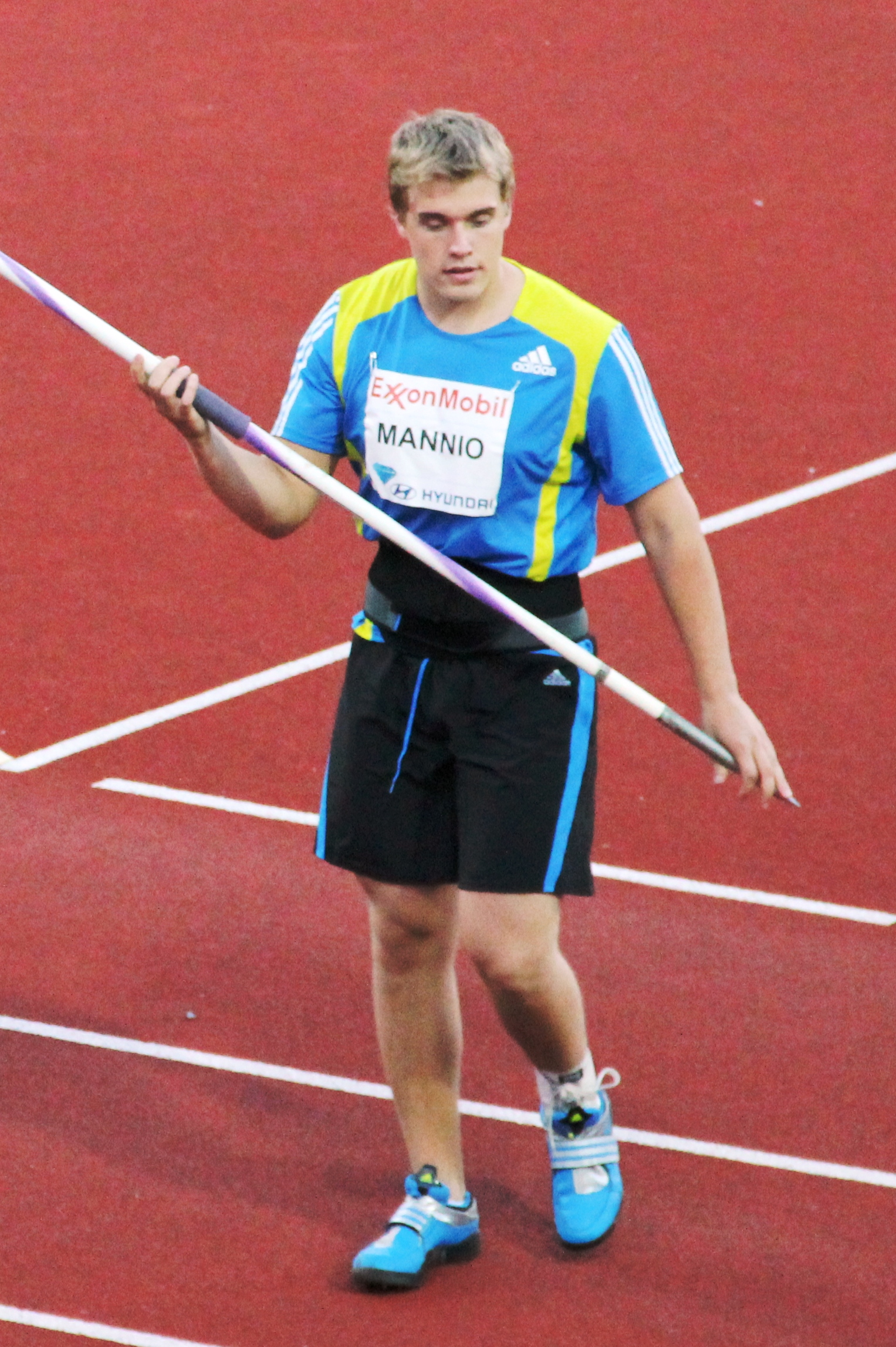
- Ari Mannio at the 2010 Bislett Games

Personal information
- Born: July 23, 1987 (age 38) Lehtimäki, Finland
- Height: 1.85 m (6 ft 1 in)
- Weight: 100 kg (220 lb)

Sport
- Country: Finland
- Sport: Athletics
- Event: Javelin

Achievements and titles
- Personal best(s): 86.82 Karis, Raseborg 7 June 2015

Ari Pekka Mannio (born July 23, 1987) is a retired Finnish javelin thrower.

== Early career ==
Mannio first represented Finland internationally at the 2003 European Youth Olympic Festival in Paris, France, where he won the bronze medal. The next year, he competed in the 2004 World Junior Championships in Grosseto, Italy, placing sixth against boys up to two years older and setting a new personal best of 70.63 metres with the men's 800 gram javelin. Mannio's first full year with the men's implement was in 2005. That year, he claimed a bronze medal at the European Junior Championships in Kaunas, Lithuania.

2006 saw Mannio's first successes against adult javelin throwers, as he claimed a bronze medal at the 2006 Finnish Championships. However, even though he entered the World Junior Championships in Beijing, China, as the world junior leader, he was convincingly beaten in the final by South Africa's Robert Oosthuizen. The next year, in 2007, he again failed to claim international gold despite having the best mark coming in; entering the European U23 Championships in Debrecen, Hungary as the only man in the field to have broken 80 metres, Mannio was narrowly pushed out of the medals altogether and had to be content with 4th.

Mannio still had steady development by 2008, as Mannio had recorded a new personal best of 81.54 metres in June 2008. However, he was still only the sixth best thrower in Finland that year and was nowhere near making the three-man team for the Beijing Olympics.

== Elite career ==
Mannio opened 2009 with a massive personal best of 85.70 metres, an improvement of over four metres on his previous best. This mark was only beaten that year by five throwers worldwide and would remain his season best, even though he also exceeded his 2008 best in all of his next four competitions and either exceeded or equalled it in a total of ten competitions over the year. He also finally struck international gold: again entering the European U23 Championships as the leading favorite, he was passed in the last round by Czech Republic's Petr Frydrych but rebounded with a championship record of 84.57 metres.

Even with these improvements, Mannio missed making Finland's four-man team for the 2009 World Championships. Tero Pitkämäki was named as the defending World Champion and Tero Järvenpää based on his stellar 2008 season, while Teemu Wirkkala, who, like the other two had represented Finland at the Olympics the year before, qualified in the first trial meet at Pihtipudas. This left the fourth spot between Mannio and Antti Ruuskanen. Ruuskanen beat Mannio in many of the remaining meets, crucially including the Finnish Championships, and got the last spot while Mannio was named a reserve.

Mannio qualified for the 2012 and 2016 Olympic games, reaching the final in 2012. In 2015, Mannio beat his personal best again, with his new personal best being at 86.82 metres, an improvement of about 1 metre from his previous best in 2009.

== Seasonal bests by year ==
- 2003 - 60.58
- 2004 - 70.63
- 2005 - 76.40
- 2006 - 79.68
- 2007 - 80.31
- 2008 - 81.54
- 2009 - 85.70
- 2010 - 85.12
- 2011 - 85.12
- 2012 - 84.62
- 2013 - 84.65
- 2014 - 83.70
- 2015 - 86.82
- 2016 - 81.38
