= 2011 World Youth Championships in Athletics – Boys' javelin throw =

Boys' javelin throw at the 2011 World Youth Championships in Athletics
- Venue: Stadium Lille Métropole
- Dates: 9 July (qualification); 10 July (final)
- Competitors: 41
- Winning distance: 82.96 PB

Medalists
gold medal	Reinhard van Zyl	South Africa
silver medal	Morné Moolman	South Africa
bronze medal	Zhang Guisheng	China

The boys' javelin throw at the 2011 World Youth Championships in Athletics was held at the Stadium Lille Métropole on 9 and 10 July.

== Medalists ==
Gold	Silver	Bronze
Reinhard van Zyl; South Africa	Morné Moolman; South Africa	Zhang Guisheng; China

== Records ==
Prior to the competition, the following records were as follows.

World Youth Best	Braian Toledo (ARG)	89.34	Mar del Plata, Argentina	6 March 2010
Championship Record	Júlio César de Oliveira (BRA)	81.16	Sherbrooke, Canada	11 July 2003
World Youth Leading	Morné Moolman (RSA)	81.37	Windhoek, Namibia	28 May 2011

== Qualification ==
Qualification rule: qualification standard 70.00 m or at least best 12 qualified.

=== Group A ===
Rank	Name	Nationality	#1	#2	#3	Result	Notes
1	Zhang Guisheng	China	59.53	54.80	73.35	73.35	Q
2	Yuriy Kushniruk	Ukraine	71.36			71.36	Q
3	Reinhard van Zyl	South Africa	70.36			70.36	Q
4	Elliott Lang	Australia	68.58	69.39	67.15	69.39	q
5	Gatis Čakšs	Latvia	69.14	66.36	x	69.14	q
6	Tuomas Keto	Finland	x	66.98	x	66.98	q
7	German Komarov	Russia	x	x	64.96	64.96	
8	Evan Karakolis	Canada	60.55	x	64.95	64.95	
9	Gardar Rochmann	Norway	64.14	x	59.66	64.14	
10	Attila Rab	Hungary	59.04	63.97	58.70	63.97	
11	Axel Lönegren	Sweden	53.82	61.55	60.18	61.55	
12	Alexander Pascal	Cayman Islands	55.61	61.34	57.98	61.34	PB
13	Sindri Guðmundsson	Iceland	42.35	x	59.83	59.83	
14	Héctor Aragüés	Spain	x	59.82	56.88	59.82	
15	Mauro Fernández	Argentina	59.35	56.47	56.95	59.35	
16	Adriaan Stephanus Beukes	Botswana	53.06	59.31	51.21	59.31	
17	Joseph Figliolini	Italy	56.46	x	x	56.46	
18	David Kastrevc	Slovenia	x	46.45	55.41	55.41	
19	Stanis Nowak	France	36.48	x	50.39	50.39	
20	Gregg Orgusaar	Estonia	x	47.57	x	47.57	

=== Group B ===
Rank	Name	Nationality	#1	#2	#3	Result	Notes
1	Morné Moolman	South Africa	65.97	83.16		83.16	Q, CR
2	Joni Karvinen	Finland	80.05			80.05	Q, PB
3	Ali Kilisli	Turkey	x	75.11		75.11	Q, PB
4	Edgar Landazuri	Ecuador	68.40	59.29	57.77	68.40	q
5	Janek Õiglane	Estonia	64.15	x	67.90	67.90	q, PB
6	Povilas Dabašinskas	Lithuania	64.51	x	67.47	67.47	q
7	William White	Australia	64.97	x	65.89	65.89	
8	Kacper Oleszczuk	Poland	65.85	59.45	63.05	65.85	
9	Mārcis Grēns	Latvia	65.65	x	x	65.65	PB
10	Paraskevas Batzavalis	Greece	65.40	x	64.28	65.40	
11	Adrian Williams	Saint Kitts and Nevis	x	x	64.22	64.22	PB
12	Maged Al-Badry	Egypt	64.11	57.58	56.22	64.11	PB
13	Ryo Miyata	Japan	56.96	56.51	63.29	63.29	PB
14	Tyler Renton	Canada	59.13	61.90	54.61	61.90	
15	Lukas Wieland	Switzerland	x	57.58	61.50	61.50	
16	Mario Balcázar	Chile	x	59.05	47.83	59.05	
17	Stefano Contini	Italy	x	58.33	x	58.33	
18	Chalanaka Weerasinghe	Sri Lanka	54.49	50.75	56.90	56.90	
19	Raul Rusu	Romania	54.19	54.20	x	54.20	
20	Andreas Bertelsen	Denmark	x	x	51.55	51.55	
21	Naveen Kumar	India	44.23	x	x	44.23	

== Final ==
Rank	Name	Nationality	#1	#2	#3	#4	#5	#6	Result	Notes
1st place, gold medalist(s)	Reinhard van Zyl	South Africa	74.02	82.96	x	64.70	75.26	75.14	82.96	PB
2nd place, silver medalist(s)	Morné Moolman	South Africa	66.75	x	78.39	79.20	80.99	70.78	80.99	
3rd place, bronze medalist(s)	Zhang Guisheng	China	74.68	75.58	72.28	75.95	76.40	77.62	77.62	
4	Yuriy Kushniruk	Ukraine	74.22	64.19	70.24	x	76.11	77.10	77.10	PB
5	Povilas Dabašinskas	Lithuania	x	74.16	75.87	73.68	x	x	75.87	PB
6	Joni Karvinen	Finland	x	68.86	74.49	68.29	x	71.13	74.49	
7	Elliott Lang	Australia	73.11	73.50	x	x	70.67	73.55	73.55	SB
8	Gatis Čakšs	Latvia	56.00	66.53	x	66.94	x	65.59	66.94	
9	Ali Kilisli	Turkey	x	66.46	x				66.46	
10	Edgar Landazuri	Ecuador	63.71	60.90	65.48				65.48	
11	Janek Õiglane	Estonia	61.11	x	64.70				64.70	
12	Tuomas Keto	Finland	62.56	60.89	x				62.56	
