= 2012 World Junior Championships in Athletics – Men's javelin throw =

The men's javelin throw at the 2012 World Junior Championships in Athletics was held at the Estadi Olímpic Lluís Companys on 12 and 13 July.

== Medalists ==
Gold	Keshorn Walcott; Trinidad and Tobago
Silver	Braian Toledo; Argentina
Bronze	Morné Moolman; South Africa

== Records ==
Prior to the competition, the existing world junior and championship records were as follows.

World Junior Record	Zigismunds Sirmais (LAT)	84.69	Bauska, Latvia	22 June 2011
Championship Record	John Robert Oosthuizen (RSA)	83.07	Beijing, China	19 August 2006
World Junior Leading	Keshorn Walcott (TRI)	82.83	San Salvador, El Salvador	1 July 2012

== Results ==
=== Qualification ===
Qual. rule: qualification standard 72.00 m (Q) or at least best 12 qualified (q)

Rank	Group	Name	Nationality	#1	#2	#3	Result	Note
1	B	Luke Cann	Australia	74.54			74.54	Q
2	A	Keshorn Walcott	Trinidad and Tobago	74.17			74.17	Q
3	A	William White	Australia	73.55			73.55	Q
4	B	Morné Moolman	South Africa	72.64			72.64	Q
5	A	Jaka Muhar	Slovenia	65.46	72.55		72.55	Q
6	B	Braian Toledo	Argentina	72.48			72.48	Q
7	A	Bernhard Seifert	Germany	72.47			72.47	Q
8	A	Intars Išejevs	Latvia	72.09			72.09	Q
9	B	Joni Karvinen	Finland	67.73	X	71.96	71.96	q, PB
10	B	Norbert Rivasz-Tóth	Hungary	63.66	63.60	69.47	69.47	q, PB
11	A	Yuriy Kushniruk	Ukraine	65.62	63.43	69.00	69.00	q
12	B	Rajesh Kumar Bind	India	68.08	68.90	65.43	68.90	q
13	A	Konsta Koskela	Finland	66.46	64.28	68.83	68.83	PB
14	A	Håkon Løvenskiold Kveseth	Norway	64.38	61.75	68.45	68.45	PB
15	B	Markus Kosok	Germany	62.54	68.22	65.10	68.22	
16	A	Chao-Tsun Cheng	Chinese Taipei	62.81	66.19	67.88	67.88	
17	B	Alain de Deugd	Netherlands	65.72	X	68.02	68.02	
18	A	Jurriaan Wouters	Netherlands	63.31	61.87	67.55	67.55	
19	A	Alexander Pascal	Cayman Islands	63.48	67.41	67.00	67.41	
20	B	Nicoliai Bovelle	Barbados	67.39	65.11	59.17	67.39	
21	A	Devin Bogert	United States	67.27	64.83	63.00	67.27	
22	B	Zhangxuan Ye	China	67.00	63.11	65.32	67.00	
23	B	Paulo Enrique da Silva	Brazil	64.61	63.14	66.43	66.43	
24	A	Marius Simanavicius	Lithuania	X	66.41	X	66.41	
25	B	Sean Keller	United States	66.33	65.86	66.06	66.33	
26	A	Sebastian Thörngren	Sweden	66.10	64.47	62.66	66.10	
27	A	Janeil Craigg	Barbados	66.10	X	63.28	66.10	
28	B	Sho Tanaka	Japan	66.04	X	X	66.04	
29	B	Yeram Kim	South Korea	60.77	X	65.73	65.73	
30	B	Sindri Gudmundsson	Iceland	57.91	62.51	65.26	65.26	
31	A	Ali Kilisli	Turkey	X	64.81	64.35	64.81	
32	B	Adriaan Stephanus Beukes	Botswana	60.67	64.58	62.43	64.58	
33	A	Raul Stefan Rusu	Romania	62.45	53.68	64.10	64.10	
34	A	Pablo Bugallo	Spain	X	63.70	X	63.70	PB
35	A	Matti Mortimore	Great Britain	60.28	63.24	58.53	63.24	
36	B	Blaž Marn	Slovenia	63.19	X	X	63.19	
37	B	Kacper Oleszczuk	Poland	57.67	62.93	62.18	62.93	
38	B	Jakub Duras	Slovakia	62.61	X	X	62.61	
39	A	Tyler Renton	Canada	58.74	62.47	59.90	62.47	
40	B	Chia-Ho Ku	Chinese Taipei	55.01	62.21	57.12	62.21	
41	B	Mauro Fraresso	Italy	61.73	57.53	X	61.73	
42	B	Mkarem Al-Mahamid	Syria	X	X	59.95	59.95	
43	A	Andrej Benák	Slovakia	59.21	54.34	57.84	59.21	
44	A	Albert Martirosyan	Armenia	53.65	55.07	53.83	55.07	
45	B	Evan Karakolis	Canada	54.71	X	55.65	55.65	
46	B	Marcis Grens	Latvia	X	X	47.54	47.54	

=== Final ===
Rank	Name	Nationality	#1	#2	#3	#4	#5	#6	Result	Note
1st place, gold medalist(s)	Keshorn Walcott	Trinidad and Tobago	70.77	77.03	69.75	X	75.67	78.64	78.64	
2nd place, silver medalist(s)	Braian Toledo	Argentina	73.45	77.09	74.32	71.07	75.11	74.58	77.09	
3rd place, bronze medalist(s)	Morné Moolman	South Africa	71.53	75.63	X	75.12	76.29	75.14	76.29	PB
4	Bernhard Seifert	Germany	X	75.84	X	X	74.12	X	75.84	SB
5	Intars Išejevs	Latvia	71.52	69.79	X	71.68	72.04	74.12	74.12	
6	Joni Karvinen	Finland	70.90	X	68.33	X	70.63	X	70.90	
7	Luke Cann	Australia	70.15	62.31	69.69	69.61	68.88	65.19	70.15	
8	William White	Australia	66.33	69.62	60.74	65.03	66.06	67.09	69.62	
9	Yuriy Kushniruk	Ukraine	X	66.18	69.19				69.19	
10	Rajesh Kumar Bind	India	65.33	69.00	63.55				69.00	
11	Jaka Muhar	Slovenia	66.48	65.91	X				66.48	
12	Norbert Rivasz-Tóth	Hungary	66.12	61.29	64.32				66.12	

== Participation ==
According to an unofficial count, 46 athletes from 35 countries participated in the event.

- Argentina (1)
- Armenia (1)
- Australia (2)
- Barbados (2)
- Botswana (1)
- Brazil (1)
- Canada (2)
- Cayman Islands (1)
- China (1)
- Chinese Taipei (2)
- Finland (2)
- Germany (2)
- Hungary (1)
- Iceland (1)
- India (1)
- Italy (1)
- Japan (1)
- Latvia (2)
- Lithuania (1)
- Netherlands (2)
- Norway (1)
- Poland (1)
- Romania (1)
- Slovakia (2)
- Slovenia (2)
- South Africa (1)
- South Korea (1)
- Spain (1)
- Sweden (1)
- Syria (1)
- Trinidad and Tobago (1)
- Turkey (1)
- Ukraine (1)
- United Kingdom (1)
- United States (2)
