= Johannes Vetter =

German javelin thrower

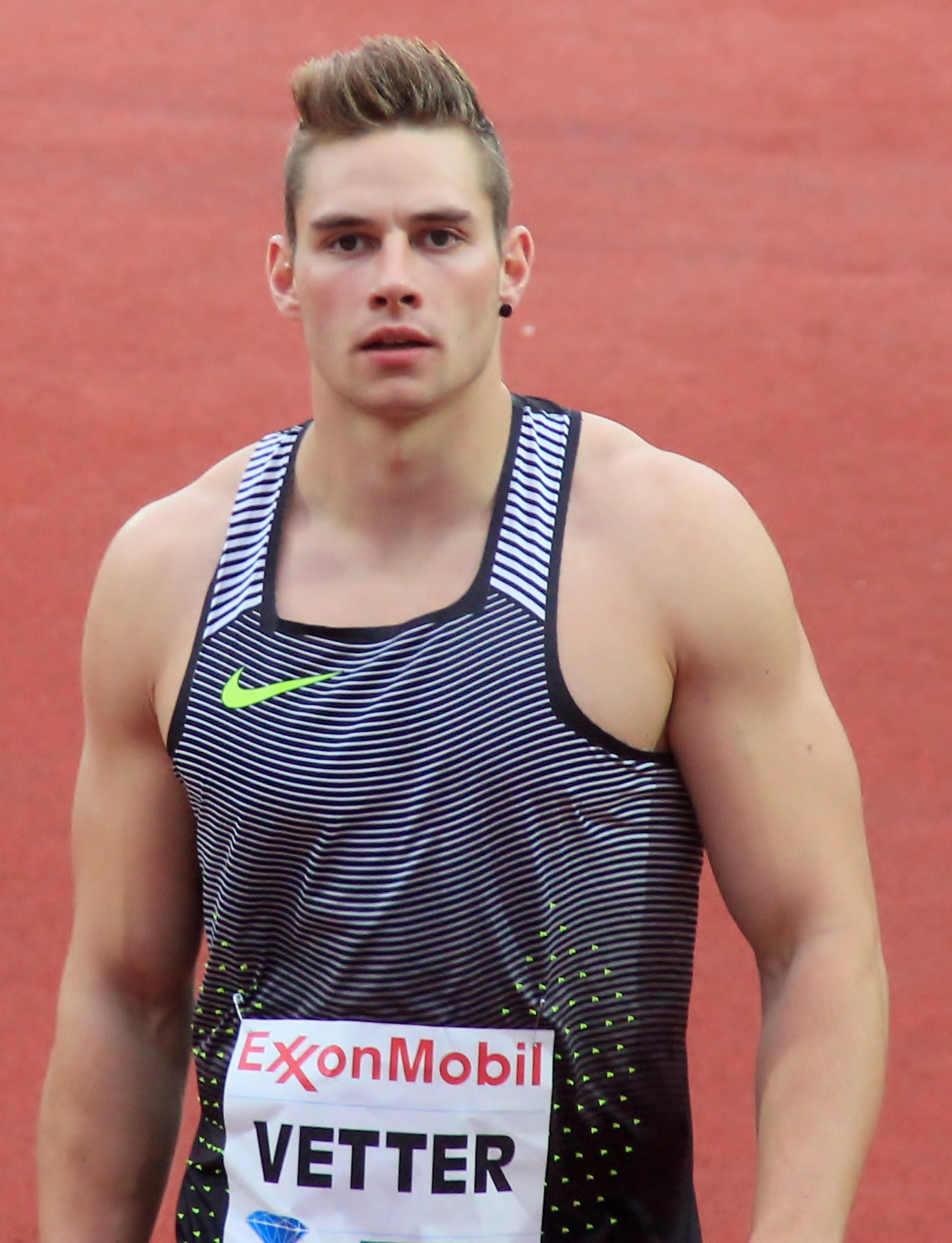
- Vetter at the 2016 Bislett Games

Personal information
- Nationality: German
- Born: 26 March 1993 (age 33) Dresden, Germany
- Height: 1.88 m (6 ft 2 in)
- Weight: 103 kg (227 lb)

Sport
- Country: Germany
- Sport: Athletics
- Event: Javelin throw
- Club: LG Offenburg
- Coached by: Boris Obergföll

Achievements and titles
- Personal bests: NR 97.76 m (2020)
Medal record
Representing Germany
World Championships
Gold medal – first place	2017 London	Javelin throw
Bronze medal – third place	2019 Doha	Javelin throw

Johannes Vetter (German: [joˈhanəs ˈfɛtɐ]; born 26 March 1993) is a German athlete who competes in the javelin throw. He won gold at the 2017 World Championships in Athletics. His personal best of 97.76 m is the German record, and ranks him second on the overall list behind Jan Železný. Vetter currently trains under Boris Obergföll and is a member of LG Offenburg's track and field squad. He was previously with SV Saar 05 Saarbrücken and Dresdner SC.

== Personal life ==
Vetter was born and raised in Dresden. His grandfather was born in Königshütte (now Chorzów, Poland) in 1941. Upon receiving his Abitur, Vetter joined the Polizei Sachsen ("Saxony State Police") and has been a Sportsoldat ("Sport Soldier") since September 2014. He has a tattoo of an Ancient Greek javelin thrower on his back.

== Career ==
=== 2011–2016 ===
In 2011, Vetter competed in the European Junior Championships. He made it through the qualifying round with a personal best 71.60 m throw. He then finished 12th in the final with a throw of 65.87 m. Zigismunds Sirmais won the event with a throw of 81.53 m.

In July 2015, Vetter took part in the European U23 Championships. He finished fourth, throwing the javelin 79.78 m. Kacper Oleszczuk won gold with a throw of 82.29 m. In August 2015, he competed in the IAAF World Championships. He finished seventh with a throw of 83.79 m. Julius Yego won the competition with a throw of 92.72 m.

Vetter competed for Germany at the 2016 Summer Olympics, along with Julian Weber and eventual gold medalist Thomas Röhler. Leading up to his maiden Olympics, Vetter unleashed the javelin with a personal best of 88.23 m to top the field and attain the Olympic entry standard (83.00 m) by a five-metre margin at the Kuortane Games in Finland. Coming to the final with the second best throw at 85.96 m from the qualifying stage, Vetter opened the competition with an 85.32 m throw on his first attempt to seize an early lead, but Röhler, along with 2015 World Champion Julius Yego of Kenya and defending Olympic Champion Keshorn Walcott of Trinidad and Tobago overtook him for the medal positions. Unable to improve his mark in the remaining attempts, Vetter finished in fourth place, outside the podium by just six centimetres. Less than a month after his disappointment at the Olympics, Vetter finished first in a world-class field at the 2016 ISTAF Berlin, throwing a personal best of 89.57 m.

=== 2017–2020 ===
In July 2017, he won the German Championship with a throw of 89.35 m. This was his first victory in the German Championship (he finished fifth in 2014, second in 2015 and fourth in 2016). Two days later, he recorded throws of 90.75 m, 91.06 m, 93.06 m and a personal best 94.44 m at the 2017 Spitzen Leichtathletik Luzern. The 94.44 m throw was also a German record, besting Röhler's 93.90 m throw from May 2017. In August 2017, he won gold at the World Championships in London with a throw of 89.89 m. Vetter finished his season at the 2017 ISTAF Berlin, where he won gold with an 89.85 m throw, nearly four metres ahead of second place Röhler. On 14 October 2017, he won the 2017 European Athlete of the Year trophy.

In March 2018, he won gold at the European Throwing Cup, throwing 92.70 m, twelve metres ahead of second place. In July, he won bronze at the 2018 German Athletics Championships, with a throw of 87.83 m. In August, he competed in the 2018 European Athletics Championships. He won the qualifying round with an 87.39 m effort, then placed fifth in the final with a throw of 83.27 m. Röhler won gold with 89.47 m.

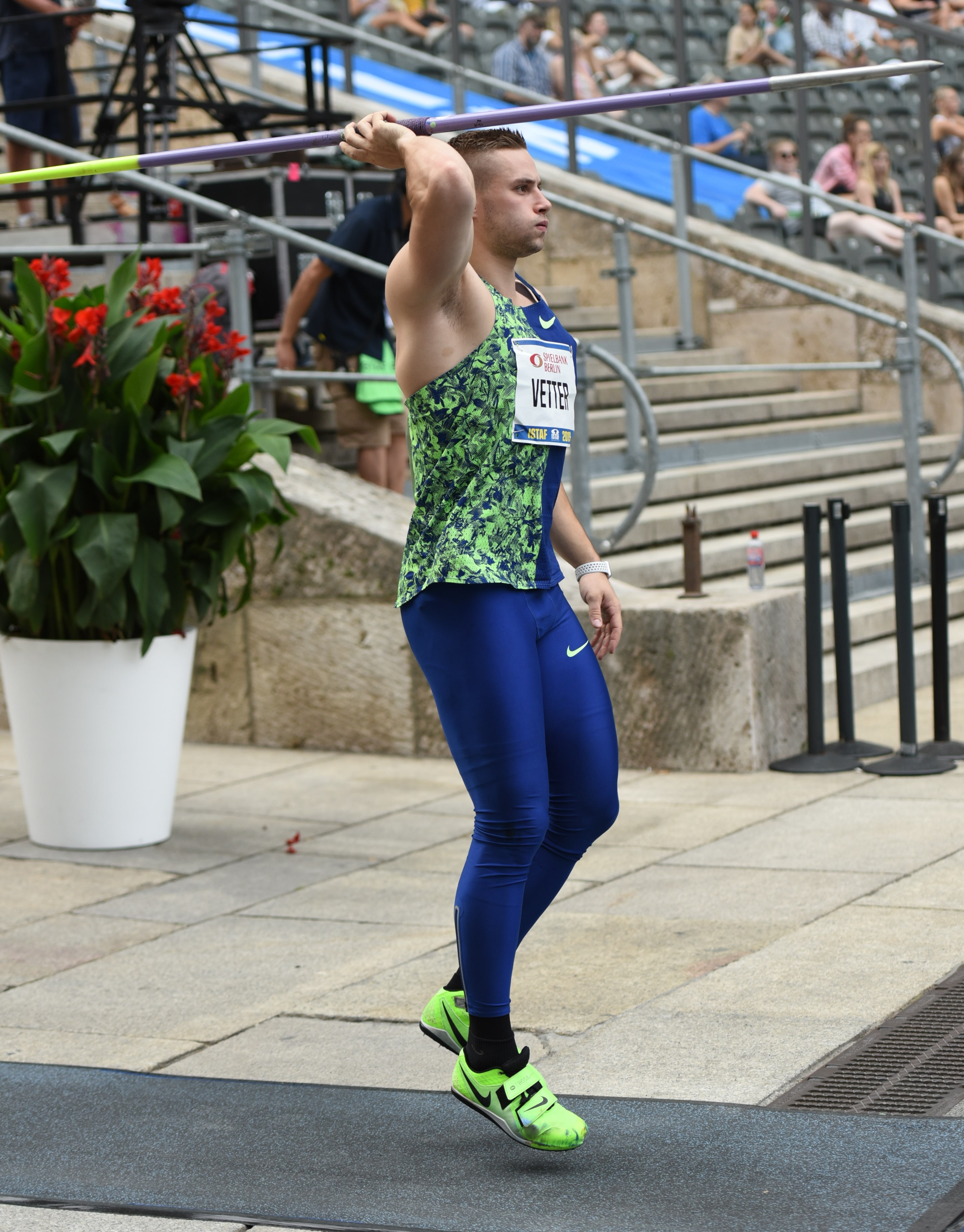
Vetter at the ISTAF Berlin 2019

Vetter represented Team Europe at The Match Europe v USA in September 2019. He won gold with a throw of 90.03 m, his best performance since May 2018. At the 2019 World Athletics Championships, Vetter had the best throw in the qualifying round, with 89.35 m. He then won bronze in the final, throwing 85.37 m. On 6 September 2020, Vetter finished first at the Kamila Skolimowska Memorial. He set a new personal best of 97.76 m, only 72 centimetres shy of Jan Železný's world record. Vetter also threw 94.84 m during the competition, along with 89.95 m and 87.28 m. He said in an interview afterwards about the 97-metre throw: "It was really close to perfection. In an open field with a good backwind, I think that throw would have been 100 metres, but I'm really happy."

==== 2020 Tokyo Olympics ====
Vetter entered the 2020 Olympic event as gold medal favourite. In qualification Group A, his highest throw was 85.64 m finishing behind Neeraj Chopra of India. He easily proceeded to the Olympic final, and his first throw was a disappointing 82.52 m, while he deliberately stepped out of the line in his next 2 throws which made his highest throw 82.52 m, and finishing 9th. He didn't proceed to the finals stage, as qualification group opponent Neeraj Chopra advanced to win gold, while Jakub Vadlejch of Czech Republic and Vitezslav Vesely of Czech Republic claiming silver and bronze respectively. After 2020 Olympic medal chance missed, Vetter said he was looking forward to Diamond League meets and upcoming World Championships and 2024 Olympics.

== Competition record ==
Year	Competition	Venue	Position	Event	Notes
Representing Germany
2011	European Junior Championships	Tallinn, Estonia	12th	Javelin throw	65.87 m
2015	European U23 Championships	Tallinn, Estonia	4th	Javelin throw	79.78 m
2015	World Championships	Beijing, China	7th	Javelin throw	83.79 m
2016	European Championships	Amsterdam, Netherlands	16th (q)	Javelin throw	79.98 m
2016	Olympic Games	Rio de Janeiro, Brazil	4th	Javelin throw	85.32 m
2017	World Championships	London, United Kingdom	1st	Javelin throw	89.89 m
2018	European Throwing Cup	Leiria, Portugal	1st	Javelin throw	92.70 m CR
2018	European Championships	Berlin, Germany	5th	Javelin throw	83.27 m
2019	World Championships	Doha, Qatar	3rd	Javelin throw	85.37 m
2020	World Athletics Continental Tour	Chorzów, Poland	1st	Javelin throw	97.76 m
2021	Olympic Games	Tokyo, Japan	9th	Javelin throw	82.52 m

== Seasonal bests by year ==
View chart definition.

Year	Performance	Place	Date
2010	51.77 metres	Nabeul, Tunisia	10 April
2011	71.60 metres	Tallinn, Estonia	21 July
2012	61.39 metres	Dresden, Germany	10 June
2013	83.73 metres	Schutterwald, Germany	5 August
2014	79.75 metres	Haldensleben, Germany	21 June
2015	85.40 metres	Jena, Germany	31 May
2016	89.57 metres	Berlin, Germany	3 September
2017	94.44 metres	Luzern, Switzerland	11 July
2018	92.70 metres	Leiria, Portugal	11 March
2019	90.03 metres	Minsk, Belarus	10 September
2020	97.76 metres	Chorzów, Poland	6 September
2021	96.29 meters	Chorzów, Poland	21 May
2022	85.64 metres	Offenburg, Germany	15 May
2023	80.82 metres	Leverkusen, Germany	29 July
2024	73.16 metres	Braunschweig, Germany	29 June

== See also ==
- Athletics in Germany
- Germany at the Olympics
