= Dukurs =

Family name

Origin
- Origin: Latvian

Dukurs (feminine: Dukure) is a Latvian surname. Individuals with the surname include:

- Dainis Dukurs (born 1954), Latvian bobsledder
- Martins Dukurs (born 1984), Latvian skeleton racer, son of Dainis
- Tomass Dukurs (born 1984), Latvian skeleton racer, son of Dainis
