= 2013 European Athletics U23 Championships – Men's javelin throw =

The Men's javelin throw event at the 2013 European Athletics U23 Championships was held in Tampere, Finland, at Ratina Stadium on 11 and 12 July.

== Medalists ==
Gold	Zigismunds Sirmais; Latvia
Silver	Bernhard Seifert; Germany
Bronze	Thomas Röhler; Germany

== Results ==
=== Final ===
12 July 2013

Rank	Name	Nationality	Attempts						Result	Notes
Rank	Name	Nationality	1	2	3	4	5	6	Result	Notes
1st place, gold medalist(s)	Zigismunds Sirmais	Latvia	70.51	x	82.77	79.72	77.33	81.76	82.77	SB
2nd place, silver medalist(s)	Bernhard Seifert	Germany	78.77	82.42	x	78.12	x	-	82.42	PB
3rd place, bronze medalist(s)	Thomas Röhler	Germany	81.74	x	80.72	x	76.59	80.08	81.74	
4	Rolands Štrobinders	Latvia	78.71	x	x	77.19	x	77.81	78.71	
5	Krzysztof Szalecki	Poland	74.52	78.08	77.45	x	74.52	x	78.08	PB
6	Dejan Mileusnić	Bosnia and Herzegovina	75.18	75.13	77.65	75.84	77.44	73.58	77.65	
7	Sami Peltomäki	Finland	71.80	76.77	74.37	76.02	74.77	x	76.77	
8	Toni Sirviö	Finland	74.01	72.60	72.55	70.45	71.87	71.62	74.01	
9	Marcin Krukowski	Poland	x	x	72.37				72.37	
10	Pavel Mialeshka	Belarus	71.78	x	71.22				71.78	
11	Joel Karjalainen	Finland	x	x	70.95				70.95	
12	Killian Durechou	France	70.64	x	x				70.64	

=== Qualifications ===
Qualified: qualifying perf. 78.00 (Q) or 12 best performers (q) advance to the Final

==== Summary ====
Rank	Name	Nationality	Result	Notes
1	Rolands Štrobinders	Latvia	77.93	q
2	Bernhard Seifert	Germany	77.02	q
3	Zigismunds Sirmais	Latvia	76.29	q
4	Dejan Mileusnić	Bosnia and Herzegovina	75.62	q
5	Krzysztof Szalecki	Poland	74.20	q
6	Thomas Röhler	Germany	73.91	q
7	Toni Sirviö	Finland	73.66	q
8	Sami Peltomäki	Finland	73.40	q
9	Marcin Krukowski	Poland	72.78	q
10	Pavel Mialeshka	Belarus	72.41	q
11	Killian Durechou	France	72.30	q
12	Joel Karjalainen	Finland	71.93	q
13	Viktor Goncharov	Russia	70.37	
14	Oleksandr Nychyporchuk	Ukraine	69.89	
15	Intars Išejevs	Latvia	69.48	
16	Sebastian Thörngren	Sweden	68.86	
17	Rustem Dremdzhy	Ukraine	67.84	
18	Martin Saar	Estonia	67.11	
19	Tiago Aperta	Portugal	65.84	
20	Bartosz Osewski	Poland	64.98	
21	Blaž Marn	Slovenia	62.44	

==== Details ====
===== Group A =====
11 July 2013 / 12:50

Rank	Name	Nationality	Attempts			Result	Notes
Rank	Name	Nationality	1	2	3	Result	Notes
1	Rolands Štrobinders	Latvia	77.93	77.30	-	77.93	q
2	Krzysztof Szalecki	Poland	74.20	69.49	-	74.20	q
3	Thomas Röhler	Germany	71.00	73.91	72.27	73.91	q
4	Pavel Mialeshka	Belarus	67.04	x	72.41	72.41	q
5	Killian Durechou	France	66.25	67.15	72.30	72.30	q
6	Joel Karjalainen	Finland	70.08	70.83	71.93	71.93	q
7	Viktor Goncharov	Russia	x	70.37	68.68	70.37	
8	Oleksandr Nychyporchuk	Ukraine	x	69.89	68.30	69.89	
9	Intars Išejevs	Latvia	66.48	69.21	69.48	69.48	
10	Tiago Aperta	Portugal	60.38	x	65.84	65.84	
11	Blaž Marn	Slovenia	x	60.80	62.44	62.44	

===== Group B =====
11 July 2013 / 14:05

Rank	Name	Nationality	Attempts			Result	Notes
Rank	Name	Nationality	1	2	3	Result	Notes
1	Bernhard Seifert	Germany	77.02	76.37	-	77.02	q
2	Zigismunds Sirmais	Latvia	75.40	76.29	73.59	76.29	q
3	Dejan Mileusnić	Bosnia and Herzegovina	69.81	75.62	x	75.62	q
4	Toni Sirviö	Finland	73.66	71.63	-	73.66	q
5	Sami Peltomäki	Finland	72.26	73.40	-	73.40	q
6	Marcin Krukowski	Poland	69.91	72.78	x	72.78	q
7	Sebastian Thörngren	Sweden	68.86	63.11	x	68.86	
8	Rustem Dremdzhy	Ukraine	64.38	65.88	67.84	67.84	
9	Martin Saar	Estonia	67.11	65.96	66.98	67.11	
10	Bartosz Osewski	Poland	64.98	x	64.50	64.98	

== Participation ==
According to an unofficial count, 21 athletes from 13 countries participated in the event.

- Belarus (1)
- Bosnia and Herzegovina (1)
- Estonia (1)
- Finland (3)
- France (1)
- Germany (2)
- Latvia (3)
- Poland (3)
- Portugal (1)
- Russia (1)
- Slovenia (1)
- Sweden (1)
- Ukraine (2)
