= Latvian Sportspersonality of the year =

Latvian sport award

The Latvian Sportspersonality of the Year is chosen annually since 2005, for both men and women.

== Sportspersonality of the year ==
Year	Sportsman of the Year	Sportswoman of the Year	Rising Star of the Year	Coach of the Year	Lifetime Contribution to Sport
2005	Viktors Ščerbatihs	Jeļena Prokopčuka	Poļina Jeļizarova	Juris Krastiņš	Valentīns Mazzālītis
2006	Mārtiņš Rubenis	Jeļena Prokopčuka	Ernests Gulbis	Valentīna Eiduka	Jānis Kvēps
2007	Viktors Ščerbatihs	Jeļena Prokopčuka	Aiga Grabuste	Eduards Andruškevičs	Uļjana Semjonova
2008	Māris Štrombergs	Anete Jēkabsone-Žogota	Sinta Ozoliņa	Valentīna Eiduka	Vilnis Baltiņš
2009	Jānis Miņins	Anete Jēkabsone-Žogota	Anastasija Sevastova	Aleksandrs Starkovs	Jānis Lūsis
2010	Martins Dukurs	Ineta Radēviča	Artjoms Rudņevs	Dainis Dukurs	Gunārs Jākobsons
2011	Martins Dukurs	Ineta Radēviča	Zigismunds Sirmais	Dainis Dukurs	Jānis Serģis
2012	Māris Štrombergs	Ineta Radēviča	Laura Ikauniece-Admidiņa	Ivo Lakučs	Valija Drauga
2013	Martins Dukurs	Anastasija Grigorjeva	Zemgus Girgensons	Dainis Dukurs	Imants Pļaviņš
2014	Martins Dukurs	Anastasija Grigorjeva	Jeļena Ostapenko	Sandis Prūsis	Miķelis Rubenis
2015	Martins Dukurs	Laura Ikauniece-Admidiņa	Kristaps Porziņģis	Sandis Prūsis	Jānis Siliņš
2016	Kristaps Porziņģis	Laura Ikauniece-Admidiņa	Rebeka Koha	Sandis Prūsis	Ainārs Eglons Leja
2017	Kristaps Porziņģis	Jeļena Ostapenko	Gunta Latiševa-Čudare	Eduards Andruškevičs	Arkādijs Svece
2018	Oskars Melbārdis	Anastasija Sevastova	Artūrs Žagars	Sandis Prūsis	Valdis Ķuzis
2019	Martins Dukurs	Anastasija Sevastova	Krists Neilands	Genādijs Samoilovs	Imants Ziediņš
2020	Mairis Briedis	Patrīcija Eiduka	Elvis Merzļikins	Dmitrijs Šiholajs	Valentīna Eiduka
2021	Kārlis Lasmanis	Tīna Graudiņa	—	Raimonds Feldmanis	Visvaldis Freidenfelds
2022	Deniss Vasiļjevs	Tīna Graudiņa	—	Luca Banchi	Maija Ukstiņa
2023	Artūrs Šilovs	Agate Caune	—	Luca Banchi	Igo Japiņš
2024	Kristaps Porziņģis	Kitija Laksa	Kristians Fokerots	Viktors Morozs	Zigfrīds Markainis
2025	Toms Skujiņš	Anete Sietiņa	Estere Volfa	Gints Palameiks	Andris Vitauts Kļaviņš

== Titles by sport ==
Sport	Sportspersons	Titles
Athletics	3	8
Skeleton	1	6
Basketball	2	4
Tennis	2	3
Bobsleigh	2	2
Weightlifting	1	2
Cycling	1	2
Wrestling	1	2
Luge	1	1
