= Natallia Shymchuk =

Belarusian javelin thrower

Nataliya Mikhaylovna Shymchuk (Belarusian: Натальля Міхайлаўна Шымчук; born 14 November 1980) is a Belarusian former javelin thrower. Her personal best throw is 63.24 metres, achieved in June 2008 in Annecy. She is affiliated with the Republican Centre for Physical Education and Sports in Brest, Belarus.

== Achievements ==
Year	Competition	Venue	Position	Notes
Representing Belarus
1999	European Junior Championships	Riga, Latvia	8th	52.75 m
2000	World Junior Championships	Santiago, Chile	12th	45.32 m
2001	European U23 Championships	Amsterdam, Netherlands	13th (q)	51.17 m
2003	European U23 Championships	Bydgoszcz, Poland	4th	57.45 m
2003	Universiade	Daegu, South Korea	6th	54.32 m
2004	Olympic Games	Athens, Greece	41st (q)	51.23 m
2005	Universiade	İzmir, Turkey	11th	51.22 m
2006	European Championships	Gothenburg, Sweden	15th (q)	57.40 m
2007	Universiade	Bangkok, Thailand	4th	58.69 m
2008	Olympic Games	Beijing, China	23rd (q)	57.11 m
