= Athletics at the 2005 Summer Universiade – Women's javelin throw =

The women's javelin throw event at the 2005 Summer Universiade was held on 20 August in Izmir, Turkey.

== Results ==
Rank	Athlete	Nationality	#1	#2	#3	#4	#5	#6	Result	Notes
1st place, gold medalist(s)	Barbora Špotáková	Czech Republic	58.02	57.88	56.16	60.64	60.73	57.57	60.73	
2nd place, silver medalist(s)	Ma Ning	China	57.35	59.18	59.18	58.10	58.36	55.18	59.18	PB
3rd place, bronze medalist(s)	Justine Robbeson	South Africa	56.18	58.70	54.38	56.74	58.55	57.40	58.70	PB
4	Goldie Sayers	Great Britain	54.09	x	x	54.31	54.40	56.25	56.25	
5	Inga Kožarenoka	Latvia	54.07	53.46	55.99	52.42	54.39	x	55.99	
6	Zahra Bani	Italy	48.66	55.02	x	52.21	x	53.73	55.02	
7	Inga Stasiulionytė	Lithuania	53.54	52.79	51.44	49.38	51.97	x	53.54	
8	Mariya Abakumova	Russia	x	48.48	53.48	x	51.55	52.96	53.48	
9	Misa Nakano	Japan	47.62	50.22	52.48				52.48	
10	Yelena Makarova	Russia	51.14	51.36	51.04				51.36	
11	Natallia Shymchuk	Belarus	x	49.87	51.22				51.22	
12	Sunette Viljoen	South Africa	51.09	47.29	48.29				51.09	
13	Berna Demirci	Turkey	50.17	49.77	50.26				50.26	
14	Dominique Bilodeau	Canada	49.56	x	47.99				49.56	
15	Annet Kabasindi	Uganda	46.81	46.52	44.79				46.81	SB
16	Daniela Todorova	Bulgaria	46.10	46.41	x				46.41	
17	Panagiota Touloumtzi	Greece	45.38	43.90	45.02				45.38	
18	Silke Bachmann	Germany	42.94	x	x				42.94	
