= 2001 European Athletics U23 Championships – Women's javelin throw =

The women's javelin throw event at the 2001 European Athletics U23 Championships was held in Amsterdam, Netherlands, at Olympisch Stadion on 12 July.

== Medalists ==
| Gold | Nikolett Szabó; Hungary |
| Silver | Mercedes Chilla; Spain |
| Bronze | Moonika Aava; Estonia |

== Results ==
=== Final ===
12 July

| Rank | Name | Nationality | Attempts | | | | | | Result | Notes |
| Rank | Name | Nationality | 1 | 2 | 3 | 4 | 5 | 6 | Result | Notes |
|---|---|---|---|---|---|---|---|---|---|---|
| 1st place, gold medalist(s) | Nikolett Szabó | Hungary | 60.69 | 56.65 | – | – | 57.12 | x | 60.69 | CR |
| 2nd place, silver medalist(s) | Mercedes Chilla | Spain | 53.81 | 57.78 | 50.47 | 49.32 | 51.88 | – | 57.78 | |
| 3rd place, bronze medalist(s) | Moonika Aava | Estonia | 52.83 | 51.98 | x | 50.75 | 56.12 | x | 56.12 | |
| 4 | Monika Kołodziejska-Mrówka | Poland | 50.39 | 53.08 | 49.17 | 52.54 | 51.32 | 54.44 | 54.44 | |
| 5 | Tetyana Lyakhovych | Ukraine | 53.39 | x | 54.04 | 50.55 | 53.49 | 52.06 | 54.04 | |
| 6 | Jarmila Klimešová | Czech Republic | 53.48 | 53.73 | 51.09 | x | 50.77 | x | 53.73 | |
| 7 | Sílvia Cruz | Portugal | 53.09 | 46.28 | 52.22 | 47.35 | 53.58 | 49.05 | 53.58 | |
| 8 | Jana Ladewig | Germany | 49.12 | 51.24 | 52.55 | 49.52 | 49.69 | 50.53 | 52.55 | |
| 9 | Christina Obergföll | Germany | 49.10 | 51.77 | 46.58 | | | | 51.77 | |
| 10 | Andrea Gránicz | Hungary | 49.82 | 51.72 | 51.42 | | | | 51.72 | |
| 11 | Bina Ramesh | France | 50.36 | 49.45 | 50.80 | | | | 50.80 | |
| 12 | Inga Stasiulionytė | Lithuania | 48.50 | x | x | | | | 48.50 | |

=== Qualifications ===
12 July
Qualifying 56.00 or 12 best to the Final

==== Group A ====
| Rank | Name | Nationality | Result | Notes |
|---|---|---|---|---|
| 1 | Andrea Gránicz | Hungary | 53.81 | q |
| 2 | Mercedes Chilla | Spain | 53.57 | q |
| 3 | Sílvia Cruz | Portugal | 51.65 | q |
| 4 | Dana Lehmann | Germany | 50.64 | |
| 5 | Line Svarstad | Norway | 50.15 | |
| 6 | Asa Lindberg | Finland | 48.96 | |
| 7 | Jennifer Kemp | Great Britain | 48.95 | |
| 8 | Annika Petersson | Sweden | 48.29 | |
| 9 | Ivana Bižaca | Croatia | 44.18 | |
| 10 | Zahra Bani | Italy | 43.78 | |

==== Group B ====
| Rank | Name | Nationality | Result | Notes |
|---|---|---|---|---|
| 1 | Nikolett Szabó | Hungary | 60.57 | Q |
| 2 | Christina Obergföll | Germany | 54.98 | q |
| 3 | Monika Kołodziejska-Mrówka | Poland | 54.87 | q |
| 4 | Inga Stasiulionytė | Lithuania | 54.06 | q |
| 5 | Tetyana Lyakhovych | Ukraine | 54.03 | q |
| 6 | Moonika Aava | Estonia | 53.68 | q |
| 7 | Jarmila Klimešová | Czech Republic | 53.67 | q |
| 8 | Bina Ramesh | France | 52.65 | q |
| 9 | Jana Ladewig | Germany | 51.69 | q |
| 10 | Natalya Shymchuk | Belarus | 51.17 | |
| 11 | Laura Radu | Romania | 47.49 | |

== Participation ==
According to an unofficial count, 21 athletes from 18 countries participated in the event.

- Belarus (1)
- Croatia (1)
- Czech Republic (1)
- Estonia (1)
- Finland (1)
- France (1)
- Germany (3)
- Great Britain (1)
- Hungary (2)
- Italy (1)
- Lithuania (1)
- Norway (1)
- Poland (1)
- Portugal (1)
- Romania (1)
- Spain (1)
- Sweden (1)
- Ukraine (1)
