= 2000 World Junior Championships in Athletics – Women's javelin throw =

The women's javelin throw event at the 2000 World Junior Championships in Athletics was held in Santiago, Chile, at Estadio Nacional Julio Martínez Prádanos on 19 and 20 October.

== Medalists ==
Gold	Jarmila Klimešová; Czech Republic
Silver	Inga Kožarenoka; Latvia
Bronze	Halina Kakhava; Belarus

== Results ==
=== Final ===
20 October

Rank	Name	Nationality	Attempts						Result	Notes
Rank	Name	Nationality	1	2	3	4	5	6	Result	Notes
1st place, gold medalist(s)	Jarmila Klimešová	Czech Republic	48.88	50.51	x	x	52.17	54.82	54.82	
2nd place, silver medalist(s)	Inga Kožarenoka	Latvia	49.88	50.62	45.95	x	54.64	51.27	54.64	
3rd place, bronze medalist(s)	Halina Kakhava	Belarus	54.26	52.38	51.46	46.95	48.04	x	54.26	
4	Magdalena Czenska	Poland	x	51.74	53.59	-	-	-	53.59	
5	Yi Chunmei	China	50.96	x	49.74	48.77	x	53.12	53.12	
6	Goldie Sayers	United Kingdom	51.52	x	47.90	50.12	x	x	51.52	
7	Hidemi Ueki	Japan	47.24	46.94	47.77	46.97	42.96	50.88	50.88	
8	Christina Obergföll	Germany	49.10	48.35	48.16	44.36	47.36	50.23	50.23	
9	Maja Janjic	Yugoslavia	46.16	41.66	46.68				46.68	
10	Ilze Gribule	Latvia	x	46.47	39.86				46.47	
11	Jana Ladewig	Germany	41.63	46.10	45.38				46.10	
12	Natalya Shymchuk	Belarus	x	44.16	45.32				45.32	

=== Qualifications ===
19 October

==== Group A ====
Rank	Name	Nationality	Attempts			Result	Notes
Rank	Name	Nationality	1	2	3	Result	Notes
1	Yi Chunmei	China	50.66	52.40	-	52.40	Q
2	Inga Kožarenoka	Latvia	52.13	-	-	52.13	Q
3	Natalya Shymchuk	Belarus	51.43	51.56	x	51.56	q
4	Jana Ladewig	Germany	51.09	51.32	51.15	51.32	q
5	Hidemi Ueki	Japan	45.81	50.40	49.50	50.40	q
6	Maja Janjic	Yugoslavia	49.91	49.02	46.63	49.91	q
7	Marion Bonaudo	France	48.96	43.83	43.92	48.96	
8	Inga Stasiulionytė	Lithuania	46.68	41.96	38.32	46.68	
9	Katy Polansky	United States	x	43.17	41.06	43.17	
10	Andrea McBride	New Zealand	x	x	42.97	42.97	
11	Steph Hancock	Australia	40.12	38.38	37.80	40.12	

==== Group B ====
Rank	Name	Nationality	Attempts			Result	Notes
Rank	Name	Nationality	1	2	3	Result	Notes
1	Halina Kakhava	Belarus	55.73	-	-	55.73	Q
2	Jarmila Klimešová	Czech Republic	54.61	-	-	54.61	Q
3	Goldie Sayers	United Kingdom	54.58	-	-	54.58	Q
4	Magdalena Czenska	Poland	50.29	50.76	50.29	50.76	q
5	Ilze Gribule	Latvia	49.48	45.90	x	49.48	q
6	Christina Obergföll	Germany	49.40	46.02	49.16	49.40	q
7	Marie Bringard	France	47.69	44.02	47.19	47.69	
8	Martina Ratej	Slovenia	x	46.83	45.38	46.83	
9	Xénia Frajka	Hungary	44.40	43.86	44.83	44.83	
10	Hana'a Omar	Egypt	37.10	35.17	42.14	42.14	

== Participation ==
According to an unofficial count, 21 athletes from 17 countries participated in the event.

- Australia (1)
- Belarus (2)
- China (1)
- Czech Republic (1)
- Egypt (1)
- France (2)
- Germany (2)
- Hungary (1)
- Japan (1)
- Latvia (2)
- Lithuania (1)
- New Zealand (1)
- Poland (1)
- Slovenia (1)
- United Kingdom (1)
- United States (1)
- Yugoslavia (1)
