= 2015 European Athletics U23 Championships – Men's javelin throw =

The men's javelin throw event at the 2015 European Athletics U23 Championships was held in Tallinn, Estonia, at Kadriorg Stadium on 11 and 12 July.

== Medalists ==
Gold	Kacper Oleszczuk; Poland
Silver	Maksym Bohdan; Ukraine
Bronze	Bernhard Seifert; Germany

== Results ==
=== Final ===
12 July

Rank	Name	Nationality	Attempts						Result	Notes
Rank	Name	Nationality	1	2	3	4	5	6	Result	Notes
1st place, gold medalist(s)	Kacper Oleszczuk	Poland	74.25	82.29	79.15	x	x	x	82.29	PB
2nd place, silver medalist(s)	Maksym Bohdan	Ukraine	80.08	78.10	79.59	74.95	81.08	76.65	81.08	
3rd place, bronze medalist(s)	Bernhard Seifert	Germany	x	74.95	79.72	79.06	76.61	80.57	80.57	SB
4	Johannes Vetter	Germany	73.78	79.78	x	75.34	77.90	75.21	79.78	
5	Julian Weber	Germany	75.61	79.31	79.11	76.60	77.02	78.94	79.31	
6	Paraskevás Batzávalis	Greece	77.08	x	x	75.26	74.73	78.43	78.43	
7	Janis Griva	Latvia	74.32	76.34	75.95	75.27	x	73.65	76.34	
8	Joni Karvinen	Finland	71.46	74.10	69.44	73.02	68.94	71.04	74.10	
9	Jan Kubeš	Czech Republic	73.52	x	67.97				73.52	
10	Gatis Čakšs	Latvia	72.48	x	71.57				72.48	
11	Jurriaan Wouters	Netherlands	x	70.52	71.97				71.97	
12	Blaž Marn	Slovenia	71.01	x	x				71.01	

=== Qualifications ===
11 July

Rank	Name	Nationality	Attempts			Result	Notes
Rank	Name	Nationality	1	2	3	Result	Notes
1	Paraskevás Batzávalis	Greece	78.48			78.48	PB Q
2	Maksym Bohdan	Ukraine	77.76			77.76	Q
3	Janis Griva	Latvia	66.85	x	76.81	76.81	Q
4	Julian Weber	Germany	73.24	76.73		76.73	Q
5	Kacper Oleszczuk	Poland	72.85	76.48	75.51	76.48	q
6	Blaž Marn	Slovenia	76.09	69.80	69.02	76.09	PB q
7	Johannes Vetter	Germany	x	73.50	75.75	75.75	q
8	Jurriaan Wouters	Netherlands	75.02	70.30	x	75.02	SB q
9	Jan Kubeš	Czech Republic	69.05	73.59	66.76	73.59	q
10	Joni Karvinen	Finland	70.14	72.48	–	72.48	q
11	Bernhard Seifert	Germany	67.76	67.36	71.24	71.24	q
12	Gatis Čakšs	Latvia	x	69.90	70.99	70.99	q
13	George Catalin Zaharia	Romania	65.98	69.37	70.22	70.22	
14	Raul Rusu	Romania	69.38	69.74	x	69.74	
15	Alan Ferber	Israel	65.83	69.34	66.43	69.34	
16	Aliaksandr Kazlouski	Belarus	63.93	69.17	68.37	69.17	
17	Skirmantas Šimoliūnas	Lithuania	66.44	67.51	x	67.51	
18	Håkon Løvenskiold Kveseth	Norway	61.67	67.32	x	67.32	
19	Attila Rab	Hungary	65.63	63.94	66.19	66.19	
20	Quincy Andersson	Sweden	62.94	65.92	x	65.92	
21	Vetle Brunvatne	Norway	65.01	x	61.40	65.01	

== Participation ==
According to an unofficial count, 21 athletes from 16 countries participated in the event.

- Belarus (1)
- Czech Republic (1)
- Finland (1)
- Germany (3)
- Greece (1)
- Hungary (1)
- Israel (1)
- Latvia (2)
- Lithuania (1)
- Netherlands (1)
- Norway (2)
- Poland (1)
- Romania (2)
- Slovenia (1)
- Sweden (1)
- Ukraine (1)
