= Inga Stasiulionytė =

Lithuanian-Monegasque javelin thrower (born 1981)

Medal record

Women's javelin throw

Representing Monaco

Games of the Small States of Europe
Silver medal – second place	2013 Luxembourg	Javelin throw
Silver medal – second place	2015 Iceland	Javelin throw

Inga Stasiulionytė (born 29 June 1981 in Vilnius) is a Lithuanian-Monegasque javelin thrower. Her personal best throw is 62.27 metres, achieved in July 2005 in Kaunas.

Representing the USC Trojans track and field team, Stasiulionytė won the 2001 NCAA Division I Outdoor Track and Field Championships in the javelin.

Stasiulionytė finished sixth at the 1999 European Junior Championships and seventh at the 2005 Summer Universiade. She also competed at the 2005 World Championships and the 2008 Olympic Games without reaching the final round.

Stasiulionytė competes in AS Monaco Athletics Club which allowed her to represent Monaco in the Games of the Small States of Europe, where she won two silver medals in 2013 and 2015. With her results achieved in 2013 Games of the Small States of Europe she was 7th best javelin thrower in Lithuania in 2013.

== Competition record ==
Year	Competition	Venue	Position	Notes
Representing Lithuania
1999	European Junior Championships	Riga, Latvia	6th	53.32 m
2000	World Junior Championships	Santiago, Chile	16th (q)	46.68 m
2001	European U23 Championships	Amsterdam, Netherlands	12th	48.50 m
2003	European U23 Championships	Bydgoszcz, Poland	14th	48.07 m
2003	Universiade	Daegu, South Korea	13th	51.64 m
2005	World Championships	Helsinki, Finland	25th (q)	54.38 m
2005	Universiade	İzmir, Turkey	7th	53.54 m
2008	Olympic Games	Beijing, China	32nd (q)	55.66 m
