= Bernhard Seifert =

German javelin thrower

Personal information
- Nationality: German
- Born: 15 February 1993 (age 33) Hildburghausen, Germany

Sport
- Sport: Athletics
- Event: Javelin throw
- Club: SC Potsdam
- Coached by: Burkhard Looks

Bernhard Seifert (born 15 February 1993) is a German athlete specializing in the javelin throw. He represented Germany at the 2020 Summer Olympics in the javelin throw.

== Career ==
Seifert was awarded the 2019 Fair Play Prize of German Sports after he allowed Julian Weber to take his spot at the 2019 World Athletics Championships.

Seifert represented Germany at the 2020 Summer Olympics in the javelin throw.

== International competitions ==
Year	Competition	Venue	Position	Event	Notes
Representing Germany
2012	World Junior Championships	Barcelona, Spain	4th	Javelin throw	75.84 m
2013	European U23 Championships	Tampere, Finland	2nd	Javelin throw	82.42 m
2013	World Championships	Moscow, Russia	13th (q)	Javelin throw	80.02 m
2015	European U23 Championships	Tallinn, Estonia	3rd	Javelin throw	80.57 m
2018	European Throwing Cup	Leiria, Portugal	2nd	Javelin throw	80.62 m
2021	Olympic Games	Tokyo, Japan	31st (q)	Javelin throw	68.30 m
