= 2003 European Athletics U23 Championships – Women's javelin throw =

The women's javelin throw event at the 2003 European Athletics U23 Championships was held in Bydgoszcz, Poland, at Zawisza Stadion on 19 July.

== Medalists ==
Gold	Jarmila Klimešová; Czech Republic
Silver	Iryna Kharun; Ukraine
Bronze	Mariya Yakovenko; Russia

== Results ==
=== Final ===
19 July

Rank	Name	Nationality	Attempts						Result	Notes
Rank	Name	Nationality	1	2	3	4	5	6	Result	Notes
1st place, gold medalist(s)	Jarmila Klimešová	Czech Republic	59.05	59.62	–	58.18	60.54	54.80	60.54	
2nd place, silver medalist(s)	Iryna Kharun	Ukraine	58.28	55.79	54.46	53.18	x	56.75	58.28	
3rd place, bronze medalist(s)	Mariya Yakovenko	Russia	x	54.28	x	56.02	x	57.52	57.52	
4	Natallia Shymchuk	Belarus	54.12	56.87	50.98	51.05	55.29	57.45	57.45	
5	Xénia Frajka	Hungary	53.92	52.24	54.72	55.89	56.83	55.71	56.83	
6	Barbora Špotáková	Czech Republic	49.29	52.33	56.65	x	52.87	49.22	56.65	
7	Stefanie Hessler	Germany	54.68	53.54	53.44	54.83	51.77	52.30	54.83	
8	Christina Obergföll	Germany	51.51	54.28	48.94	x	x	47.81	54.28	
9	Magdalena Czenska	Poland	54.09	51.88	51.39				54.09	
10	Linda Brivule	Latvia	48.98	49.70	54.07				54.07	
11	Goldie Sayers	United Kingdom	53.41	53.90	x				53.90	
12	Jana Trakmann	Estonia	45.07	50.54	44.47				50.54	
13	Inga Kožarenoka	Latvia	50.40	x	49.02				50.40	
14	Inga Stasiulionytė	Lithuania	48.07	x	43.93				48.07	
15	Halina Kakhava	Belarus	47.08	46.62	x				47.08	
16	Johanna Heeb	Liechtenstein	44.22	42.87	37.78				44.22	

== Participation ==
According to an unofficial count, 16 athletes from 12 countries participated in the event.

- Belarus (2)
- Czech Republic (2)
- Estonia (1)
- Germany (2)
- Hungary (1)
- Latvia (2)
- Liechtenstein (1)
- Lithuania (1)
- Poland (1)
- Russia (1)
- Ukraine (1)
- United Kingdom (1)
