= Valentīna Eiduka =

Latvian javelin thrower

Personal information
- Nationality: Latvian
- Born: 12 March 1937
- Died: 19 November 2023 (aged 86)

Sport
- Country: Soviet Union
- Sport: Athletics
- Event: Javelin Throw
- Now coaching: Vadims Vasiļevskis; Ainārs Kovals; Zigismunds Sirmais; Sinta Ozoliņa-Kovala; Inga Kožarenoka

Achievements and titles
- Regional finals: 8 time Latvian SSR champion

Valentīna Eiduka (12 March 1937 - 19 November 2023) was a Latvian javelin thrower. She was the coach of several notable Latvian javelin throwers, including Olympic medalists Vadims Vasiļevskis and Ainārs Kovals.

Her personal best throw is 52.97 metres, achieved in 1964. During her career she became an eight-time Latvian SSR champion in javelin throw. In 2006 and 2008 she was voted the Latvian Coach of the year. In 2008, she also received the fourth rank Order of the Three Stars.

She has been coaching Olympic medalists Vadims Vasiļevskis and Ainārs Kovals, as well as the current junior world record holder Zigismunds Sirmais, Sinta Ozoliņa-Kovala, Inga Kožarenoka. Formerly she also coached Voldemārs Lūsis, the son of legendary Jānis Lūsis.
