= Artjoms Rudņevs =

Latvian footballer (born 1988)

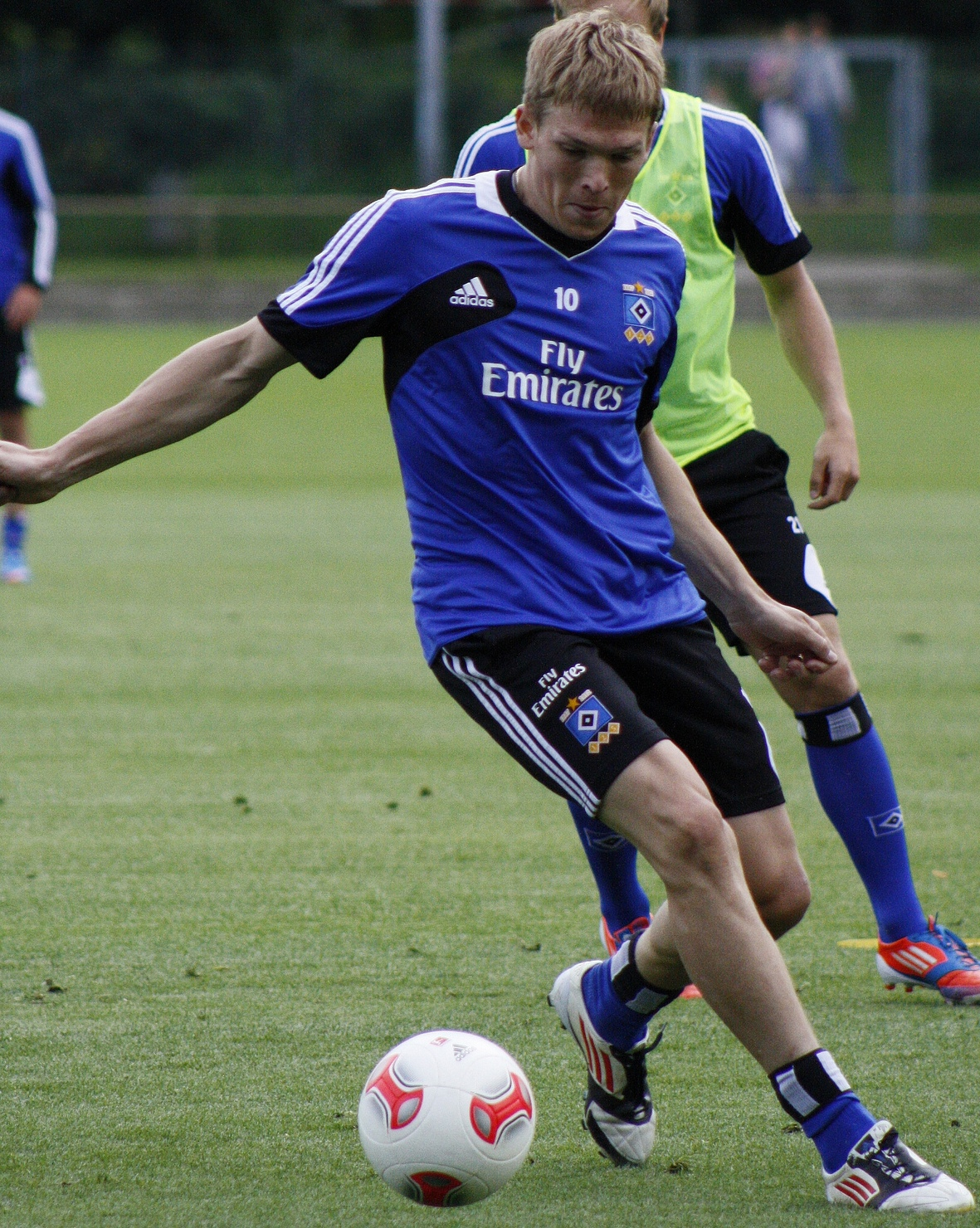
- Rudnevs at practice with HSV in 2012

Personal information
- Date of birth: 13 January 1988 (age 38)
- Place of birth: Daugavpils, Latvia
- Height: 1.83 m (6 ft 0 in)
- Position: Striker

Youth career
- Daugava Daugavpils

Senior career*
Years	Team	Apps	(Gls)
2005–2008	Daugava Daugavpils	75	(21)
2009–2010	Zalaegerszegi TE	30	(20)
2010–2012	Lech Poznań	56	(33)
2012–2016	Hamburger SV	74	(15)
2014	→ Hannover 96 (loan)	16	(4)
2015	Hamburger SV II	5	(3)
2016–2017	1. FC Köln	18	(3)
Total		274	(99)

International career
2007–2009	Latvia U21	9	(3)
2008–2017	Latvia	38	(2)
- * Club domestic league appearances and goals

Artjoms Rudņevs (born 13 January 1988) is a Latvian former professional footballer who played as a striker for Daugava Daugavpils in his home country, for Zalaegerszegi TE in Hungary, for Lech Poznań in Poland, and for Bundesliga clubs Hamburger SV, Hannover 96, and 1. FC Köln. At the international level, he represented the Latvia national team.

== Club career ==
=== Early career and ZTE ===
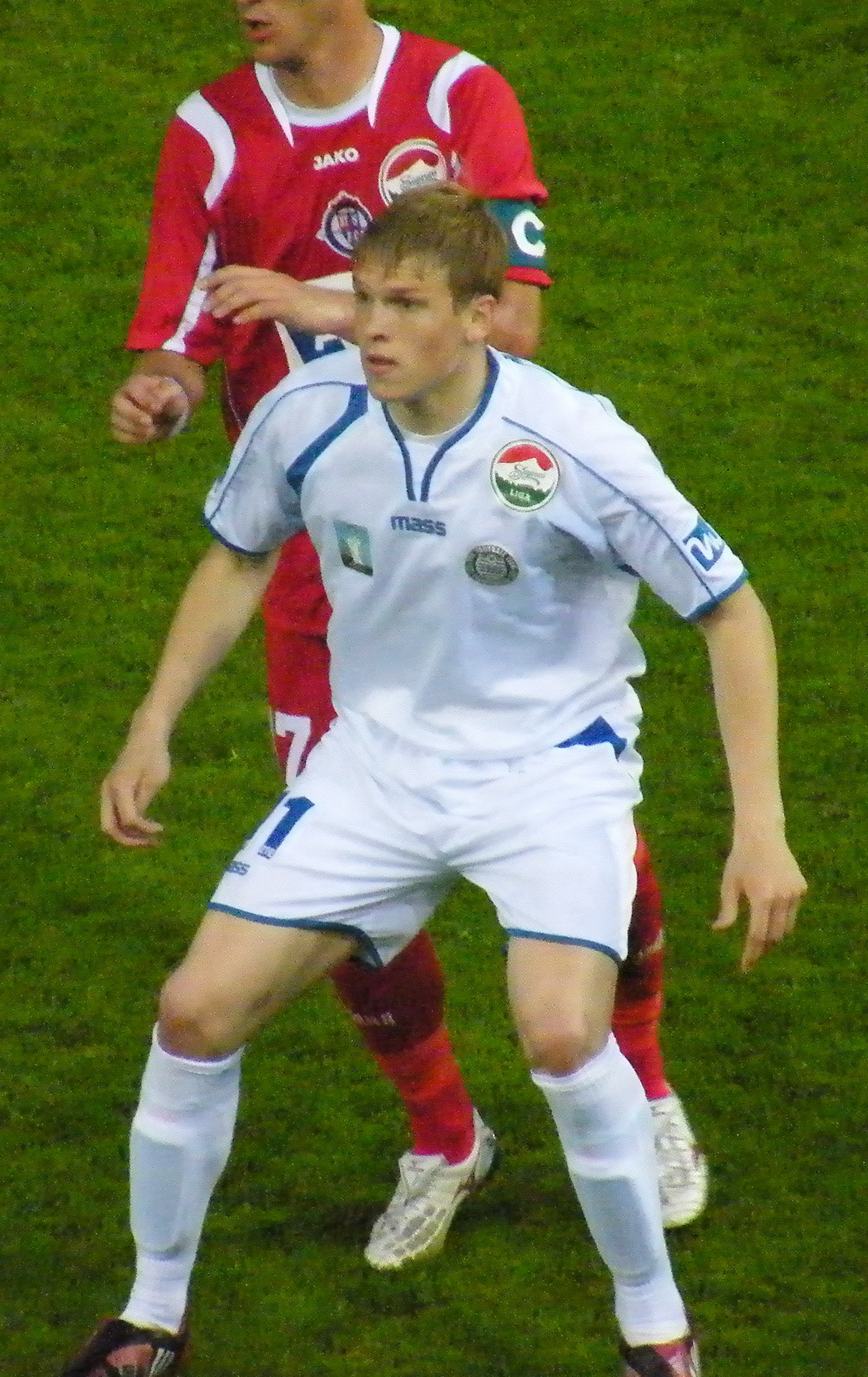
Rudnevs during his spell at Zalaegerszeg against Nyíregyháza in 2009

Rudņevs started his career with his local club FC Daugava in Daugavpils, where he played until February 2009, when he signed a contract with the Hungarian club Zalaegerszegi TE. However, the previous contract with Daugava was still active, so FIFA was involved in resolving the conflict. In May 2009, he made his debut in Hungary, where he played for three seasons, scoring 20 goals in 30 league matches.

=== Lech Poznań ===
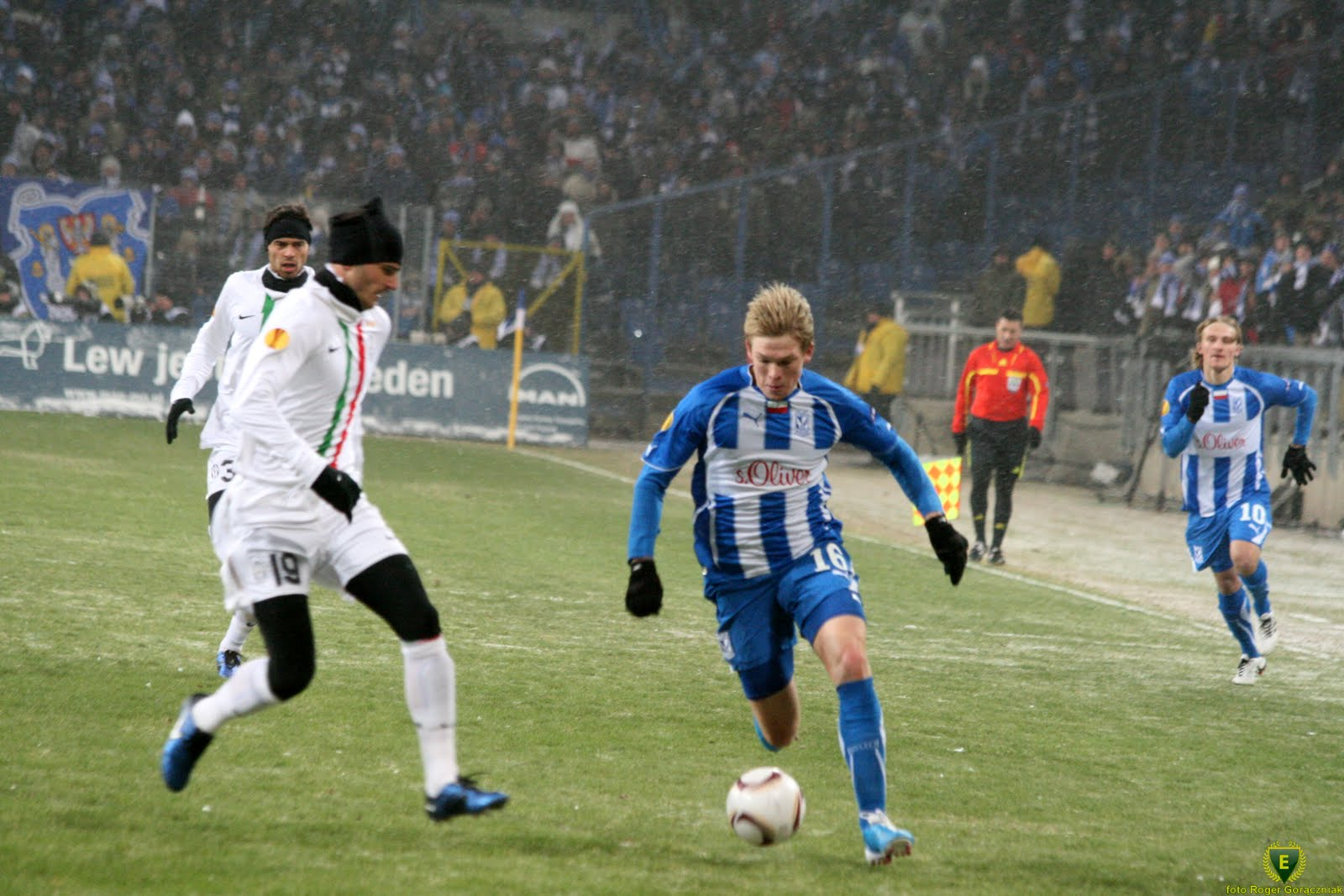
Rudņevs playing against Leonardo Bonucci of Juventus in the 2010–11 Europa League

In July 2010, rumors circulated that the Ekstraklasa club Lech Poznań were interested in signing him. These rumors were subsequently confirmed and Rudņevs joined the club on trial. After a successful trial at the club and after passing the medical tests, Lech started talks with ZTE regarding a permanent transfer. The clubs initially could not agree on the transfer fee and, when it was finally decided, the Polish team was unable to negotiate personal terms with Rudnevs. It seemed that the talks were over but in August, after Rudņevs had scored two goals in the season opener, Lech reopened discussions. This time talks were successful and Rudņevs signed a four-year contract with the Polish side.

==== 2010–11 season ====
He scored in his debut for Lech Poznań against Widzew Łódź. He added three more goals in five consecutive matches, the last of these the winning goal on 11 September 2010. Just five days later he scored a hat-trick against Juventus in the Europa League, the first goal a coolly slotted penalty, the second a scissors kick from three yards out, and the third a long-range equalizer deep into injury time. Rudņevs stated that it was "the best match of his career so far".

By the end of the Polish Ekstraklasa season, Rudņevs managed to score 11 goals in 27 matches to finish fourth in the league. On 1 December 2010, he scored yet again against Juventus, saying afterwards that Juventus' goalkeeper Alexander Manninger was his "favourite goalkeeper to play against". The match ended 1–1, a result that allowed Lech to progress to the next round, and eliminated Juventus. In the first match against SC Braga in the last 16 of the UEFA Europa League, Rudņevs scored a goal as Lech won 1–0. However, in the second match Lech lost 2–0 and were knocked out of the Europa League. With five goals in the Europa League, Rudņevs became the fourth top scorer, sharing this achievement with four other players.

==== 2011–12 season ====
By December 2011, Rudnevs was the Polish league's leading marksman, having scored 18 goals in 17 league matches. Rudņevs was named the best player of 2011 in the Ekstraklasa by the Polish Footballers' Association. Rudņevs finished the season with a league-leading 22 goals in 29 matches. On 8 May 2012, the German Bundesliga team Hamburger SV agreed on a transfer at the end of the 2011–12 season. On 11 May, the transfer was officially confirmed by both clubs.

=== Hamburger SV ===
In the 2012–13 season, Rudņevs became the first Latvian football player in the Bundesliga. Hamburger SV started the season with three consecutive losses with Rudņevs gaining only one assist. Rudņevs scored his first goal in the Bundesliga on 26 September 2012 in a 2–2 draw against Borussia Mönchengladbach. In his first season with Hamburg Rudņevs appeared in 34 league matches, scored 12 goals with four assists, finishing as Hamburg's joint top scorer alongside Son Heung-Min, who also netted 12 times. However, his form dropped, and Rudņevs lost his place in the starting eleven early in the 2013–14 Bundesliga season.

=== 1. FC Köln ===
On 15 June 2016, it was announced that Rudņevs had joined 1. FC Köln on a free transfer. On 29 September 2017, the club announced it had agreed to terminate Rudņev's contract and that he would end his career.

== International career ==
Rudņevs was first called up to the national side on 12 November 2008 for the friendly match against Estonia. He started this match in the first eleven. Rudņevs also played for the U-21 side. He was called up to the national side again in January 2010 for the friendly match against South Korea. Rudņevs started the UEFA Euro 2012 qualifying matches in the first eleven alongside Māris Verpakovskis, putting Ģirts Karlsons on the bench. On 7 October 2011, he scored his first international goal in the 2–0 victory over Malta in a Euro 2012 qualifying match.

== Personal life and controversy ==
Rudņevs is married and has a daughter born in 2011.

Rudņevs provoked controversy in his native Latvia after switching to using "Rudnev" on the back of his jersey for his second season at Lech, indicating his Russian ethnicity. He also drew the ire of his national team captain, Kaspars Gorkšs, when he stated that he would not learn the Latvian language in addition to Russian. Gorkšs wrote an open letter criticizing Rudņevs for the statement.

== Career statistics ==
=== Club ===
Appearances and goals by club, season and competition
Club	Season	League			National cup (Note: Includes Magyar Kupa, Polish Cup, DFB-Pokal)		Europe		Total	
Club	Season	Division	Apps	Goals	Apps	Goals	Apps	Goals	Apps	Goals
Daugava Daugavpils	2005	Latvian Second League	13	3	0	0	0	0	13	3
Daugava Daugavpils	2006	Latvian Higher League	20	4	0	0	0	0	20	4
Daugava Daugavpils	2007	Latvian Higher League	19	7	0	0	0	0	19	7
Daugava Daugavpils	2008	Latvian Higher League	23	7	0	0	0	0	23	7
Daugava Daugavpils	Total		75	21	0	0	0	0	75	21
Zalaegerszegi TE	2008–09	Nemzeti Bajnokság I	4	2	0	0	0	0	4	2
Zalaegerszegi TE	2009–10	Nemzeti Bajnokság I	25	16	4	3	0	0	29	19
Zalaegerszegi TE	2010–11	Nemzeti Bajnokság I	1	2	0	0	1 (Note: Appearance(s) in UEFA Europa League)	0	2	2
Zalaegerszegi TE	Total		30	20	4	3	1	0	35	23
Lech Poznań	2010–11	Ekstraklasa	27	11	5	4	8	5	40	20
Lech Poznań	2011–12	Ekstraklasa	29	22	4	3	—		33	25
Lech Poznań	Total		56	33	9	7	8	5	73	45
Hamburger SV	2012–13	Bundesliga	34	12	1	0	—		35	12
Hamburger SV	2013–14	Bundesliga	7	0	1	2	—		8	2
Hamburger SV	2014–15	Bundesliga	22	1	1	0	—		23	1
Hamburger SV	2015–16	Bundesliga	11	2	0	0	—		11	2
Hamburger SV	Total		74	15	3	2	0	0	77	17
Hamburger SV II	2015–16	Regionalliga Nord	5	3	—		—		5	3
Hannover 96 (loan)	2013–14	Bundesliga	16	4	0	0	—		16	4
1. FC Köln	2016–17	Bundesliga	18	3	3	1	—		21	4
1. FC Köln	2017–18	Bundesliga	0	0	1	0	0	0	1	0
1. FC Köln	Total		18	3	4	1	0	0	22	4
Career total			274	99	20	13	9	5	303	117

=== International ===
Appearances and goals by national team and year
National team	Year	Apps	Goals
Latvia
Latvia	2008	1	0
Latvia	2009	1	0
Latvia	2010	6	0
Latvia	2011	8	1
Latvia	2012	7	0
Latvia	2013	3	0
Latvia	2014	5	0
Latvia	2015	1	0
Latvia	2016	6	1
Total		38	2

Scores and results list Latvia's goal tally first, score column indicates score after each Rudņevs goal.

List of international goals scored by Artjoms Rudņevs
No.	Date	Venue	Cap	Opponent	Score	Result	Competition
1	7 October 2011	Skonto Stadium, Riga, Latvia	15	Malta	2–0	2–0	UEFA Euro 2012 qualifying
2	1 June 2016	Daugava Stadium, Liepāja, Latvia	35	Lithuania	2–0	2–1	2016 Baltic Cup

== Honours ==
Daugavpils Daugava

- Latvian Football Cup: 2008

Zalaegerszegi TE

- Magyar Kupa runner-up: 2009–10

Lech Poznań

- Polish Cup runner-up: 2010–11

Latvia

- Baltic Cup: 2016

Individual

- Ekstraklasa Polish Footballers' Association's Player of the Year: 2011
- Ekstraklasa top scorer: 2011–12
- Polish Cup top scorer: 2010–11
- Ekstraklasa Player of the Month: September 2011
- Latvian Rising Star of the Year: 2010

Awards
Preceded by Anastasija Sevastova	Latvian Rising Sportspersonality of the Year; 2010	Succeeded by Zigismunds Sirmais
