= Dejan Mileusnić =

Bosnian javelin thrower (born 1991)

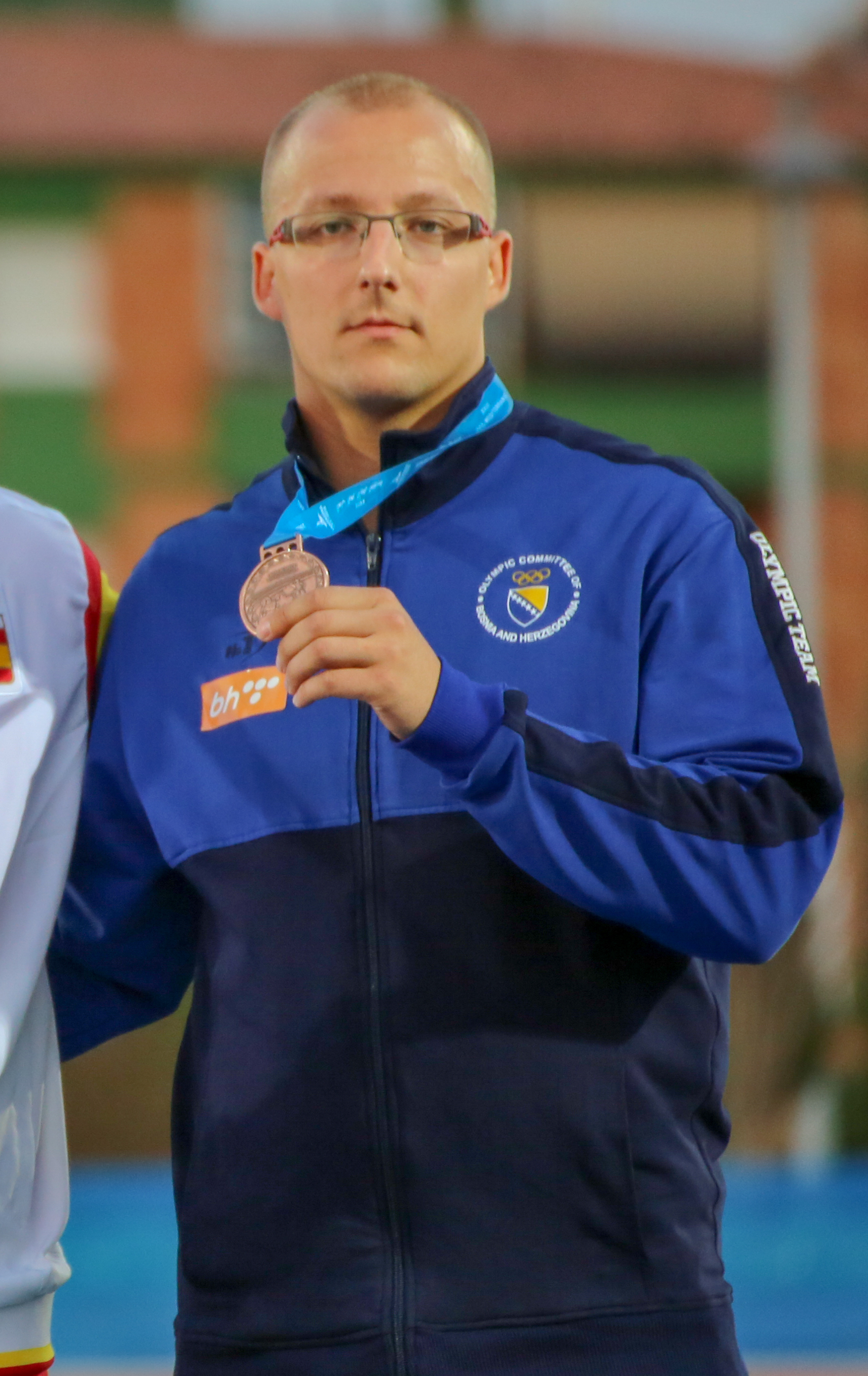
- Dejan Mileusnić in 2018

Personal information
- Born: 16 November 1991 (age 34) Zenica, SFR Yugoslavia
- Height: 1.86 m (6 ft 1 in)
- Weight: 90 kg (198 lb)

Sport
- Sport: Athletics
- Event: Javelin throw
- Club: Athletic Club Zenica

Dejan Mileusnić (born 16 November 1991 in Zenica) is a Bosnian and Herzegovian athlete specialising in the javelin throw. He won a bronze medal at the 2017 Mediterranean Games.

His personal best in the event is 81.63 metres set in Zenica in 2016. This is the current Bosnia and Herzegovina record.

== International competitions ==
Year	Competition	Venue	Position	Event	Notes
Representing Bosnia and Herzegovina
2012	European Championships	Helsinki, Finland	20th (q)	Javelin throw	73.84 m
2013	European Cup Winter Throwing (U23)	Castellón, Spain	3rd	Javelin throw	74.43 m
2013	Mediterranean Games	Mersin, Turkey	4th	Javelin throw	77.27 m
2013	European U23 Championships	Tampere, Finland	6th	Javelin throw	77.65 m
2014	European Cup Winter Throwing	Leiria, Portugal	4th	Javelin throw	80.40 m
2014	European Championships	Zürich, Switzerland	27th (q)	Javelin throw	72.52 m
2015	Universiade	Gwangju, South Korea	9th	Javelin throw	75.37 m
2016	European Championships	Amsterdam, Netherlands	25th (q)	Javelin throw	75.00 m
2018	Mediterranean Games	Tarragona, Spain	3rd	Javelin throw	71.95 m
2018	European Championships	Berlin, Germany	28th (q)	Javelin throw	67.16 m
2022	Mediterranean Games	Oran, Algeria	4th	Javelin throw	75.70 m
