= 2018 European Throwing Cup =

- Dates: 10–11 March
- Host city: Leiria, Portugal
- Venue: Estádio Dr. Magalhães Pessoa
- Events: 16
- Participation: 291 athletes from 39 nations

The 2018 European Throwing Cup is held on 10–11 March at the Estádio Dr. Magalhães Pessoa and National Throwing Centre in Leiria, Portugal. It is the eighteenth edition of the athletics competition for throwing events and was jointly organised by the European Athletic Association. The competition featured men's and women's contests in shot put, discus throw, javelin throw and hammer throw. In addition to the senior competitions, there were also under-23 events for younger athletes.

== Medal summary ==
=== Senior ===
Men
Event	Gold		Silver		Bronze	
Shot put	Aleksandr Lesnoy (ANA)	21.32 m	Michał Haratyk (POL)	21.18 m	Mesud Pezer (BIH)	20.71 m
Discus throw	Daniel Ståhl (SWE)	66.81 m	Simon Pettersson (SWE)	65.81 m	János Huszák (HUN)	63.45 m
Hammer throw	Paweł Fajdek (POL)	77.30 m	Marcel Lomnický (SVK)	75.97 m	Özkan Baltacı (TUR)	75.71 m
Javelin throw	Johannes Vetter (GER)	92.70 m	Bernhard Seifert (GER)	80.62 m	Mart ten Berge (NED)	79.92 m

Women
Event	Gold		Silver		Bronze	
Shot put	Anita Márton (HUN)	19.12 m	Aliona Dubitskaya (BLR)	18.47 m	Dimitriana Surdu (MDA)	18.45 m
Discus throw	Nadine Müller (GER)	60.42 m	Irina Rodrigues (POR)	60.39 m	Yuliya Maltseva (ANA)	59.59 m
Hammer throw	Hanna Malyshchyk (BLR)	72.62 m	Alexandra Tavernier (FRA)	71.20 m	Malwina Kopron (POL)	69.54 m
Javelin throw	Sigrid Borge (NOR)	62.42 m	Christin Hussong (GER)	60.02 m	Katharina Molitor (GER)	59.80 m

=== Under-23 ===
Under-23 men
Event	Gold		Silver		Bronze	
Shot put	Marcus Thomsen (NOR)	19.61 m	Patrick Müller (GER)	19.17 m	Leonardo Fabbri (ITA)	19.08 m
Discus throw	Martin Marković (CRO)	63.24 m	Viktar Trus (BLR)	58.66 m	Jakob Gardenkrans (SWE)	57.73 m
Hammer throw	Bence Halász (HUN)	74.83 m	Volodymyr Myslyvchuk (UKR)	71.16 m	Alberto González (ESP)	70.61 m
Javelin throw	Alexandru Novac (ROU)	80.73 m	Norbert Rivasz-Tóth (HUN)	80.26 m	Cyprian Mrzygłód (POL)	74.55 m

Under-23 women
Event	Gold		Silver		Bronze	
Shot put	Katharina Maisch (GER)	16.46 m	Sydney Giampietro (ITA)	15.76 m	Eliana Bandeira (POR)	15.74 m
Discus throw	Marija Tolj (CRO)	56.31 m	Veronika Domjan (SLO)	54.48 m	Amy Holder (GBR)	52.36 m
Hammer throw	Réka Gyurátz (HUN)	69.00 m	Sofiya Palkina (ANA)	65.97 m	Katarzyna Furmanek (POL)	65.15 m
Javelin throw	Eda Tuğsuz (TUR)	60.92 m	Anna Tarasiuk (BLR)	56.48 m	Alina Shukh (UKR)	55.02 m

== Teams Standings ==
Full results.

=== Senior ===
Men			Women		
Rank	Nation	Pts	Rank	Nation	Pts
1st	Ukraine	4,225	1st	Germany	4,145
2nd	Spain	4,208	2nd	Poland	3,955
3rd	Italy	4,175	3rd	Ukraine	3,913
4th	Romania	4,120	4th	Belarus	3,899
5th	Turkey	3,997	5th	Italy	3,897
			6th	Spain	3,817
			7th	Turkey	3,670

=== Under 23 ===
Men			Women		
Rank	Nation	Pts	Rank	Nation	Pts
1st	Italy	3,990	1st	Ukraine	3,613
2nd	Ukraine	3,929	2nd	Turkey	3,593
3rd	Belarus	3,917	3rd	Italy	3,546
4th	Romania	3,836	4th	Romania	3,492
5th	Spain	3,809			
6th	Portugal	3,735			
7th	France	3,728			
8th	Ireland	3,683			
