= Inga Kožarenoka =

Latvian javelin thrower

Inga Kožarenoka (born 16 March 1982 in Saldus) is a Latvian javelin thrower. Her personal best throw is 59.97 metres, achieved in June 2005 in Murjāņi. At the time it became Latvian record. She has been coached by Valentīna Eiduka.

She won the silver medal at the 2002 World Junior Championships, finished eleventh at the 2002 European Championships and fifth at the 2005 Summer Universiade.

== Achievements ==
Year	Competition	Venue	Position	Notes
Representing Latvia
2000	World Junior Championships	Santiago, Chile	2nd	54.64 m
2000	Olympic Games	Sydney, Australia	30th (q)	53.83 m
2002	European Championships	Munich, Germany	11th	55.28 m
2003	European U23 Championships	Bydgoszcz, Poland	13th	50.40 m
2005	Universiade	İzmir, Turkey	5th	55.99 m
2006	European Championships	Gothenburg, Sweden	13th (q)	58.25 m
