= Anastasija Sevastova =

Latvian tennis player (born 1990)

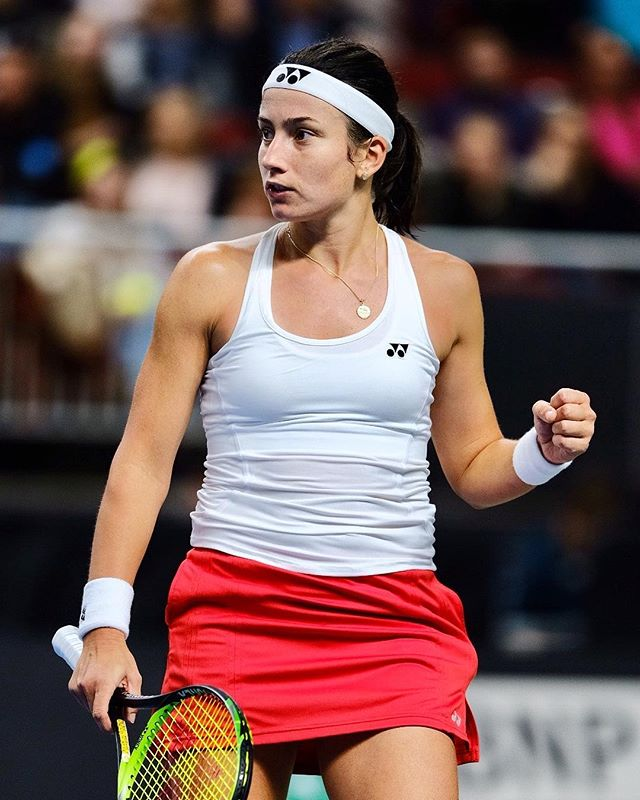
- Country (sports): Latvia
- Born: 13 April 1990 (age 36) Liepāja
- Height: 1.69 m (5 ft 7 in)
- Turned pro: 2006
- Retired: 2026
- Plays: Right (two-handed backhand)
- Coach: Ronald Schmidt
- Prize money: US$ 8,716,682

Singles
- Career record: 461–284
- Career titles: 4
- Highest ranking: No. 11 (15 October 2018)

Grand Slam singles results
- Australian Open: 4R (2011, 2019)
- French Open: 4R (2019)
- Wimbledon: 3R (2021)
- US Open: SF (2018)

Doubles
- Career record: 69–83
- Career titles: 0 WTA, 4 ITF
- Highest ranking: No. 56 (17 December 2018)

Grand Slam doubles results
- Australian Open: 2R (2017, 2018)
- French Open: 2R (2010)
- Wimbledon: 1R (2010, 2011, 2017, 2025)
- US Open: QF (2018)

Team competitions
- Fed Cup: 27–12

Anastasija Sevastova (born 13 April 1990) is a Latvian former professional tennis player. She achieved a career-high singles ranking of world No. 11 in October 2018, after reaching a Premier Mandatory final at the China Open. Sevastova won four singles titles on the WTA Tour, as well as 13 singles and four doubles titles on the ITF Circuit.

Sevastova is best known for her success at the US Open, particularly during the second half of her career. In 2016, she defeated the reigning French Open champion and world No. 3, Garbiñe Muguruza, as well as Australian Open semifinalist Johanna Konta, en route to her first major quarterfinal. In 2018, she reached her first major semifinal, defeating defending champion and world No. 3, Sloane Stephens (whom she had lost to at that same stage in 2017), in the quarterfinals, before losing to Serena Williams.

== Early life and background ==
Sevastova was born in Liepāja, Latvia. She was raised by her mother Diāna Golovanova, an English teacher. Sevastova's grandmother was interested in channeling Sevastova's energy into sports. She introduced her to the tennis at age 6. With her natural athleticism, Sevastova could have gravitated to basketball or soccer but chose tennis because her grandmother had friends who played and because the family lived near a tennis club in Liepāja.

"Pure chance. It was tennis, because it was summer, close to the water and close to our house. So you just enroll your kid." — Diāna Golovanova, on her daughter's decision.

The colder months would prove more complicated. There were no indoor tennis-dedicated facilities in Liepāja — only school gymnasiums with varnished wooden floors, where the multicolored lines used for various sports intersect like a Mondrian painting. Due to that, Sevastova played most of her winter tennis in the gymnasium in a secondary school where her mother taught. It is also the same school where Jeļena Ostapenko's mother and primary coach, Jeļena Jakovleva, attended school as a youngster.

"Until age 14, I practiced in the school gyms on the wood. Riga has some good facilities with indoor clay and hard courts, but I was always in Liepāja. Indoors on wood is a different style of play because it was so fast, and there were lots of bad bounces. Initially, the cost of playing the game was inexpensive. Like 10 euros per month. And they assigned you a coach with 10 other people." — Sevastova stated

It soon became clear that Sevastova would need to leave home to progress further. Ernests Gulbis, who was from an affluent family in Riga, was boarding at Niki Pilić's tennis academy in Munich, where a teenage Novak Djokovic was also training. Sevastova eventually followed the same path at age 14, returning regularly to Latvia to complete her schooling. At the same age, she won the Latvian under-18 championships.

== Career ==
=== 2006–13: WTA Tour title, top 100, first retirement ===
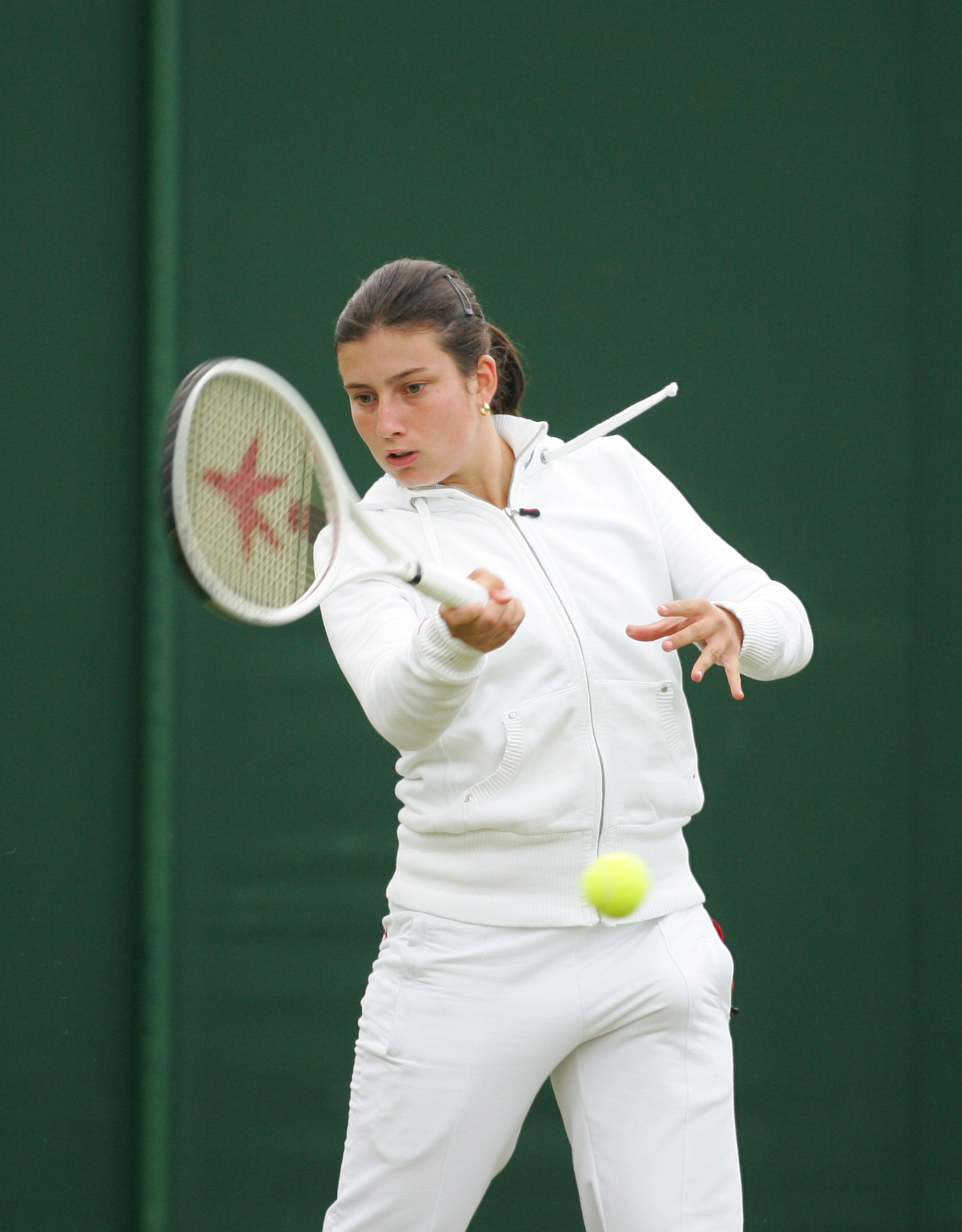
Sevastova in 2010

Sevastova began playing on the ITF Women's Circuit in April 2006, nearly before she turned 16. In July of the same year, she reached her first ITF final at the $10k event in Garching and then nearly after that won her first title in Bad Saulgau. In 2007, she made her WTA Tour debut at the İstanbul Cup where she also recorded her first WTA Tour match-win, beating Anastasiya Yakimova, before she was knocked out by fifth-seeded Alona Bondarenko in the next round. At the 2009 French Open, she made her major debut and then at the 2009 US Open, she won her first Grand Slam tournament match defeating Tamarine Tanasugarn. By the end of the year, she first entered top 100 in July, and then reached her first WTA Tour quarterfinal at the Guangzhou Open.

The following year, Sevastova got one of the bigger wins of her early career by defeating world No. 9, Jelena Janković in the first round of the 2010 Monterrey Open and then reached the semifinals, losing there to Anastasia Pavlyuchenkova. Following week, she reached third round of the Indian Wells Open, defeating Ana Ivanovic in the second round, before she lost later to Vera Zvonareva. In May, she reached her first WTA singles final at the Estoril Open, where she got the title, beating Arantxa Parra Santonja in straight sets. By the end of the year, she reached four quarterfinals on the WTA Tour, including the one at the Premier Mandatory China Open. Sevastova had a strong start to 2011, reaching round of 16 at the Australian Open, losing there to world No. 1, Caroline Wozniacki, in straight sets. As a result of her progress, she continued to rise on the ranking, getting into the top 40 after Australian Open. She then started to struggle with form, which caused dropping in rankings and also returning to play mostly on the ITF Circuit in 2012. Due to illness and injuries that she faced in the past couple of years, Sevastova announced her retirement from the tour in May 2013.

=== 2015–17: Successful return, US Open quarters, top 15, second career title ===
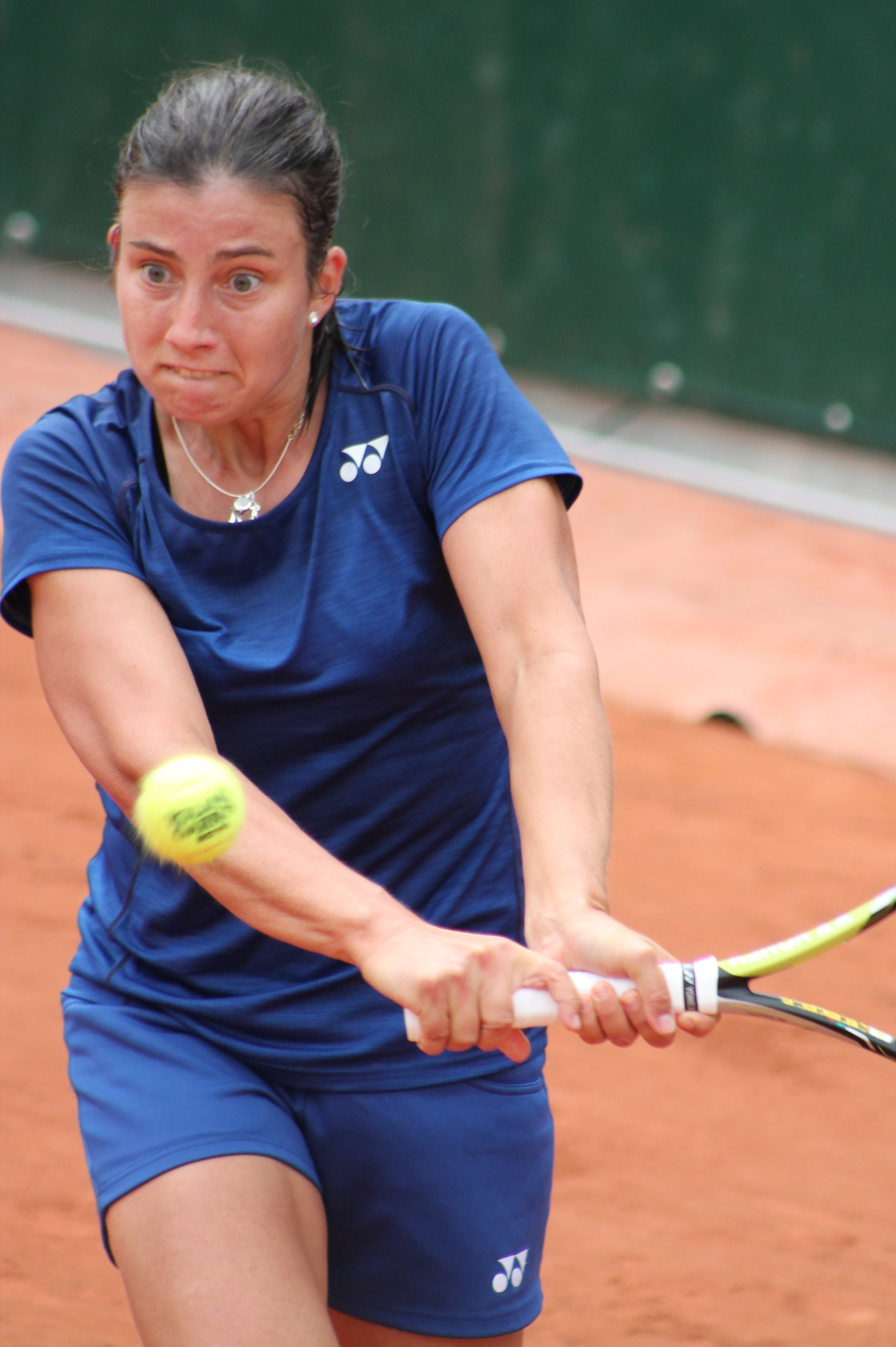
Sevastova at the 2016 French Open

In January 2015, Sevastova returned to professional tennis, receiving a wildcard into the $10k event in Sharm El Sheikh, where she also won the title. She continued with great results at the following ITF tournaments, before she returned to the WTA Tour at the Nuremberg Cup. Following week, she reached semifinal at the Brasil Tennis Cup, losing there to Teliana Pereira. Later in October, she reached the quarterfinals of the Kremlin Cup in Moscow; she upset Karolína Plíšková in the second round and then lost to eventual champion, Svetlana Kuznetsova, in three sets.

Sevastova made her return to a major tournament in the main draw at the 2016 Australian Open, losing to Ana Ivanovic in the second round. She followed this with quarterfinals of the Taiwan Open, where she lost to Venus Williams. Things became better on the grass-court Mallorca Open where she lost the final to Caroline Garcia, and then month later, she lost clay-court Bucharest Open to Simona Halep. Her most recognisable performance came at the US Open, where she stunned Garbiñe Muguruza in the second round in straight sets, followed with wins over Kateryna Bondarenko and Johanna Konta, reaching her first Grand Slam quarterfinal. However, she was defeated by Caroline Wozniacki, eclipsing a new high ranking of No. 36, on 31 January 2011.

Sevastova was improving more as 2017 season went by. She reached the third round of the Australian Open, beating Nao Hibino and Kristína Kučová, before losing to Garbiñe Muguruza. She then made into her first Premier-5 semifinal at the Dubai Championships, losing there to Caroline Wozniacki, in straight sets. She had strong start at the clay season, reaching two quarterfinals, at the Charleston Open and Stuttgart Open. In Stuttgart, she also recorded her first top-ten win of the year, defeating Johanna Konta in the second round. She then reached her first Premier Mandatory semifinal at the Madrid Open, being then eliminated by Simona Halep. There, she recorded her second top-ten win in 2017, beating world No. 3, Karolína Plíšková, in the second round, in straight sets. Sevastova claimed her first WTA title since 2010, winning Mallorca Open, where she also had reached final the previous year. In the final, she defeated Julia Görges in three sets. Following Wimbledon, where she reached only second round, Sevastova reached No. 17 in the singles rankings, and two quarterfinal appearances at the Bucharest Open and Swedish Open. At the US Tour, she reached third round of the Cincinnati Open, losing there to Simona Halep. She followed this up with her second consecutive US Open quarterfinal, winning her first three rounds easily in straight sets and defeating Maria Sharapova in the fourth round, before losing to eventual champion, Sloane Stephens. Sevastova debuted at the year-end Elite Trophy in Zhuhai. As the winner of her round-robin group, defeating Sloane Stephens and Barbora Strýcová, she lost to Julia Görges in the semifinals.

=== 2018: Third title, US Open semis & first Mandatory final ===
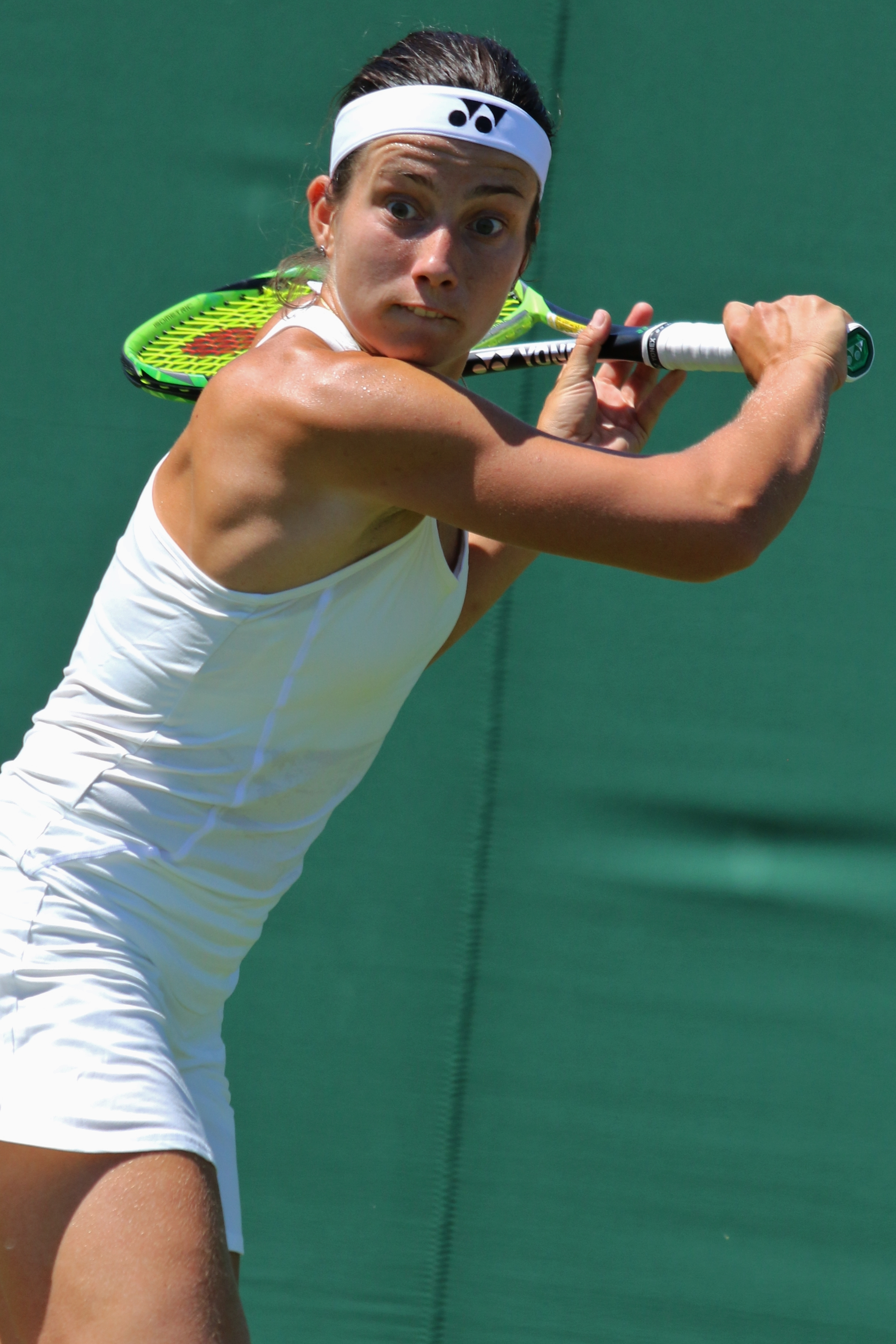
Sevastova at the 2018 Wimbledon

Sevastova continued to progress with both rankings and results. She had a strong start into the 2018 season at the Brisbane International, where she lost in the semifinals to qualifier Aliaksandra Sasnovich. Sevastova then was eliminated early at the Australian Open, reaching only the second round losing to Maria Sharapova, as well as to Simona Halep in the third round of the Qatar Ladies Open. Sevastova then made her best results at the Miami and Indian Wells Open. In Indian Wells, she defeated Monica Puig and Julia Görges, before losing to Venus Williams in the fourth round, while in Miami, she defeated Alizé Cornet and lost to Victoria Azarenka in the third round. At the Charleston Open, she reached semifinals and lost to Julia Görges.

Despite being eliminated in the early rounds at prominent clay-court tournaments including the Madrid Open, Italian Open and French Open, Sevastova had strong start of grass-court season. She reached the final of the Mallorca Open as the defending champion but lost there to Tatjana Maria. After the first-round loss at the Wimbledon, she returned to clay courts in July, and made it into the final of the Bucharest Open, defeating Petra Martić in straight sets to win her third career title.

Her best performance of the season came at the US Open Series. First, she reached quarterfinals at the Premier 5 Canadian Open, losing there to Sloane Stephens. At the US Open, Sevastova defeated Donna Vekić, Claire Liu, Ekaterina Makarova and seventh seed Elina Svitolina to reach her third consecutive quarterfinal at the tournament. In the quarterfinals, she defeated defending champion Sloane Stephens in straight sets to reach her first major semifinal, where she lost to 23-time Grand Slam champion Serena Williams, in straight sets. In October, Sevastova reached the final of the Premier Mandatory China Open, defeating Donna Vekić, Dominika Cibulková and Naomi Osaka. She lost to Caroline Wozniacki in straight sets but after the tournament, she reached world No. 12 in the rankings and then, a week later, she made her career-high ranking as world No. 11. By the end of the year, she reached semifinals at the Kremlin Cup losing there to qualifier Ons Jabeur. At the WTA Elite Trophy, she stayed in round-robin group, defeating Zhang Shuai and losing to Garbiñe Muguruza.

=== 2019–26: Variable results, return from maternity and second retirement ===
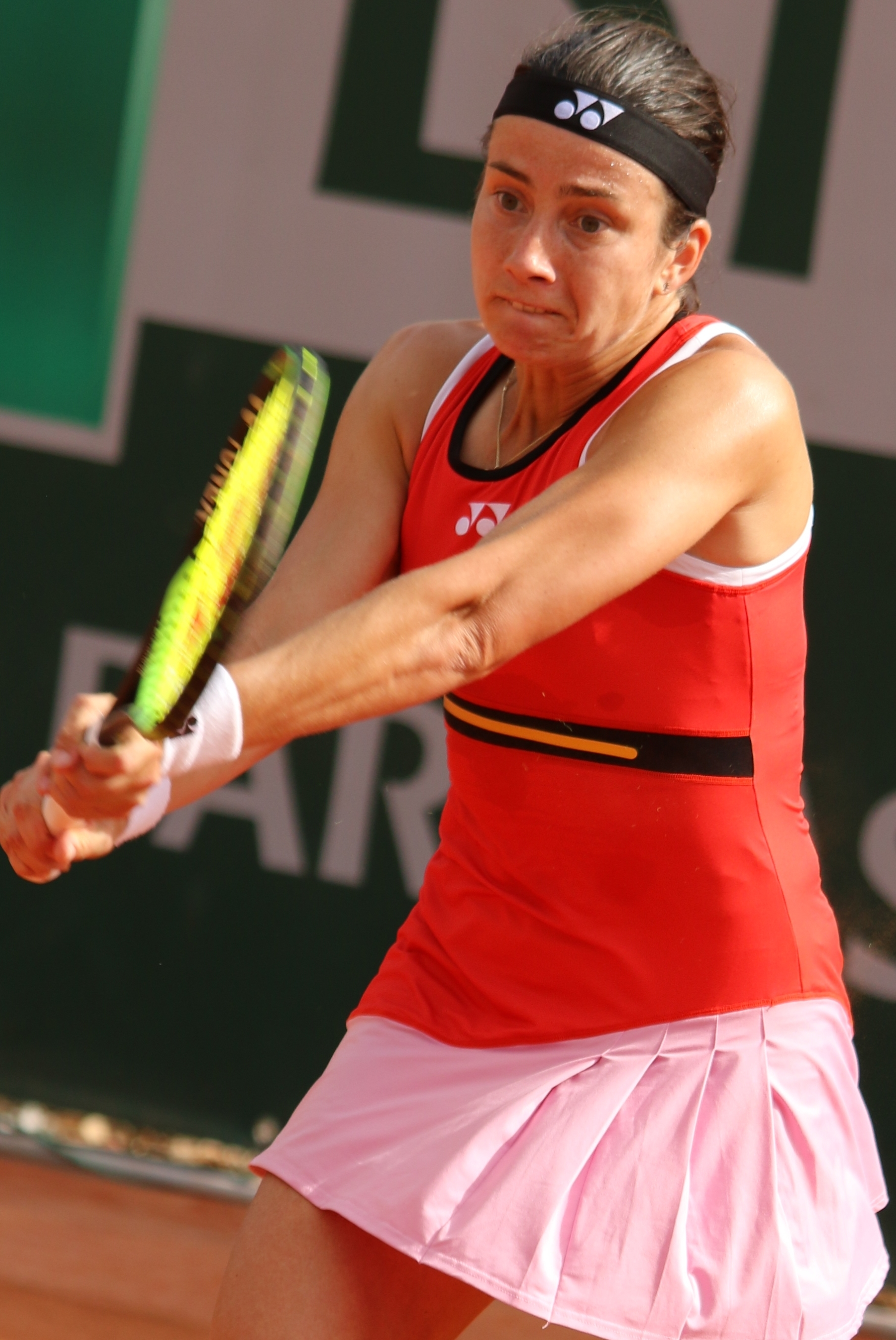
Sevastova at the 2019 French Open

Sevastova varied with results during 2019. She started her year off at the Brisbane International with a quarterfinal loss to world No. 5, Naomi Osaka, in three sets. She then went to the Australian Open and made her first second week at the event since 2011. She beat Mona Barthel, Bianca Andreescu and Wang Qiang in first three rounds and then lost to the eventual champion, Naomi Osaka. Sevastova then had a slump, partly due to injuries and resulted in early losses at the Qatar Ladies Open, Dubai Championships, Indian Wells Open and Miami Open. In April, she entered the quarterfinals at the Stuttgart Open after wins over Jeļena Ostapenko and Laura Siegemund. She then faced top-5 player Petra Kvitová, but lost in three sets. Following this, she reached the third round of the Madrid Open but failed in the first round at the Italian Open. At the French Open, for the first time, she made into the second week. During tournament, she saved five match points in her third-round match against Elise Mertens, but lost to Markéta Vondroušová in the fourth round. Sevastova began her grass-court season with semifinal at the Mallorca Open, failing to reached her fourth consecutive final in a row. After the early elimination at Wimbledon and missed her opportunity to enter the world's top 10, Sevastova would bounce back and claim what she called her most cherished title. She won the inaugural event in Latvia, the Baltic Open in Jūrmala. After her third-round loss at the US Open, Sevastova dropped out the top 20 and did not make any significant results by the end of the year.

Despite the fact season of 2020 was specific due to six months absence of the WTA Tour caused by COVID-19 pandemic, Sevastova only passed first round at the US Open, defeating Coco Gauff in three sets. As the year went by, she was dropping out the top 50 for the first time since August 2016.

In February 2022, Sevastova announced that she was taking an indefinite break from her tennis career. In November 2023, she played at the Andorra Challenger tournament with a win over Irene Burillo.

In February 2024, she returned from maternity leave to the tour-level at the Transylvania Open where she recorded her first win since January 2022, over wildcard entrant Andreea Mitu.

Sevastova retired due to injury in the second set of her quarterfinal match against Anna Karolína Schmiedlová at the ATX Open in March 2024. Following a subsequent 14-month layoff due to an ACL injury, she returned to the WTA Tour once again using her protected ranking at the 2025 Madrid Open, defeating Anastasia Pavlyuchenkova and 23rd seed Jeļena Ostapenko to reach the third round, where she was double bageled by 13th seed Diana Shnaider.

Having been handed a wildcard into the main draw of the 2025 Morocco Open, Sevastova recorded wins over fellow wildcard entrant Yasmine Kabbaj and Zeynep Sönmez, before losing in the quarterfinals to Jaqueline Cristian.

Using her protected ranking to enter the main draw of the 2025 Canadian Open, she defeated Ajla Tomljanović, 25th seed Magda Linette and third seed Jessica Pegula to reach the fourth round, at which point her run was ended by Naomi Osaka.

Sevastova announced her retirement from tennis in April 2026.

== National representation ==
Sevastova played for Latvia in the 2018 Fed Cup. After she, alongside teammates Jeļena Ostapenko, Diāna Marcinkēviča and Daniela Vismane, helped Latvia win all three of its ties in the zonal group round-robin phase, and defeat Serbia in the zonal group playoffs, Latvia advanced to the World Group II playoffs, where they played Russia. Despite Sevastova dropping her first match to Anastasia Pavlyuchenkova, Ostapenko won both of her singles rubbers, and after Sevastova defeated Ekaterina Makarova in the final singles rubber, Latvia advanced to World Group II.

== Playing style ==
Sevastova is a tactical, all-round player who uses varied shots to win points. She is also aggressive on the baseline. She possesses consistent and accurate groundstrokes, with both wings capable of producing winners. She has an accurate serve that can reach 110 mph (180 km/h). She also moves around the court well, and has good footwork. She may approach the net to finish points, and some of her best shots are her drop shots and slices. She can generate a lot of spin on both her forehand and backhand. She states that her backhand is her favourite shot. Possibly her biggest asset is her variety and resilience on court. She stated her favorite surfaces are hardcourt and clay.

== Endorsements ==
She is sponsored by Yonex for her racquets and clothing. She uses the Yonex Ezone DR 98 racquet.

== Personal life ==
Besides Latvian, she speaks English, Russian and German. During her growing up, she enjoyed watching Steffi Graf and Andre Agassi. Her favorite tournaments are Roland Garros, US Open, Mallorca Open and Bucharest Open. She went into retirement in May 2013 but returned in January 2015. She studied leisure management in Austria during her retirement. Her body started feeling better by end of 2014 so decided to give it another shot. She explained her retirement:

"I decided to stop because it was depressing. I had big back problems, some muscular problems, all the time getting fit then injured again – I was not happy, so I decided to stop and see how my body reacted." — Sevastova, on her retirement

== Career statistics ==
=== Grand Slam singles performance ===
Key
W	F	SF	QF	#R	RR	Q#	DNQ	A	NH

(W) winner; (F) finalist; (SF) semifinalist; (QF) quarterfinalist; (#R) rounds 4, 3, 2, 1; (RR) round-robin stage; (Q#) qualification round; (DNQ) did not qualify; (A) absent; (NH) not held; (SR) strike rate (events won / competed); (W–L) win–loss record.
To avoid confusion and double counting, these charts are updated at the conclusion of a tournament or when the player's participation has ended.

Tournament	2008	2009	2010	2011	2012	2013	2014	2015	2016	2017	2018	2019	2020	2021	2022	2023	SR	W–L	Win %
Australian Open	A	Q1	1R	4R	A	Q1	RT	A	2R	3R	2R	4R	1R	1R	1R	RT	0 / 9	10–9	53%
French Open	A	1R	1R	1R	A	RT		A	2R	3R	1R	4R	A	1R	RT		0 / 8	6–8	43%
Wimbledon	Q1	1R	1R	1R	A	RT		A	1R	2R	1R	2R	NH	3R	RT		0 / 8	4–8	33%
US Open	A	2R	2R	1R	Q3	RT		Q1	QF	QF	SF	3R	2R	1R	ret.		0 / 9	18–9	67%
Win–Loss	0–0	1–3	1–4	3–4	0–0	0–0	0–0	0–0	6–4	9–4	6–4	9–4	1–2	2–4	0–1	0–0	0 / 34	38–34	53%
Career statistics
Titles	0	0	1	0	0	0	0	0	0	1	1	1	0	0	0	0	Career total: 4		
Finals	0	0	1	0	0	0	0	0	2	1	3	1	0	0	0	0	Career total: 8		
Year-end ranking	194	83	45	94	181	–	–	110	35	16	12	27	54	70	677	–	$8,716,682		

Awards
Preceded by Sinta Ozoliņa	Latvian Rising Sportspersonality of the Year; 2009	Succeeded by Artjoms Rudņevs
Preceded by Jeļena Ostapenko	Latvian Sportswoman of the Year; 2018–2019	Succeeded by Patrīcija Eiduka
