= Rajesh Bind =

Indian javelin thrower

Personal information
- Nationality: Indian
- Born: 20 July 1994 (age 32) Uttar Pradesh, India

Sport
- Country: India
- Sport: Track and field
- Event: Javelin Throw

Achievements and titles
- Personal best: 80.14 m (Lucknow 2012)
Medal record
Men's athletics
Representing India
- Updated on 17 August 2013

Rajesh Kumar Bind (born 20 July 1994) is an Indian javelin thrower. He is the current Indian junior national record holder in javelin with a throw of 80.14 meters at the Junior National Championships in Lucknow in 2012. He was also named the best athlete at the games. He is supported by Olympic Gold Quest and Anglian Medal Hunt Company.
