= Pavel Mialeshka =

Belarusian javelin thrower (born 1992)

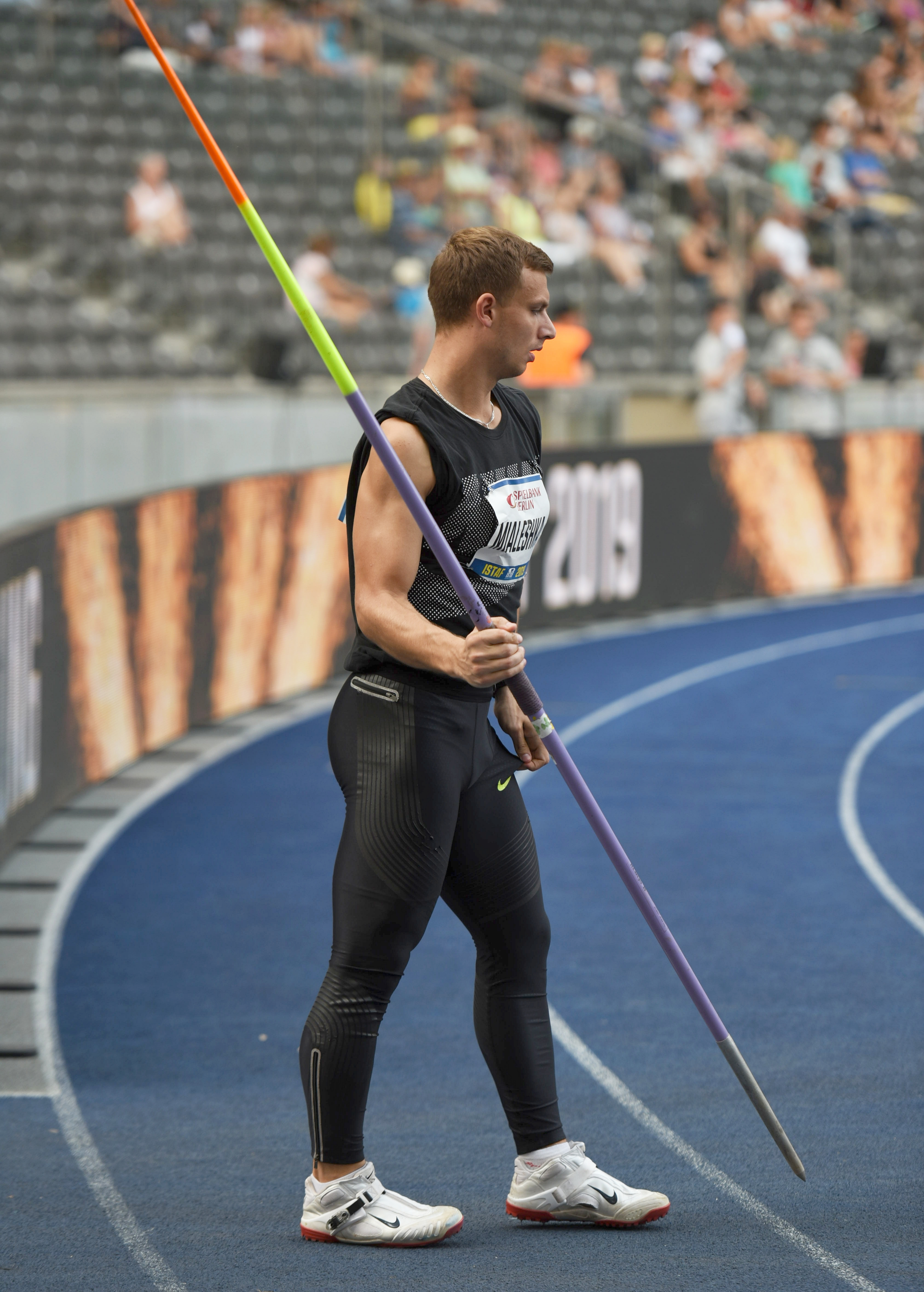

Personal information
- Native name: Павел Алегавіч Мялешка
- Born: 24 November 1992 (age 32)

Sport
- Country: Belarus
- Sport: Track and field
- Event: Javelin throw

Pavel Alehavich Mialeshka (Belarusian: Павел Алегавіч Мялешка; born 24 November 1992) is a Belarusian track and field athlete competing in the javelin throw. In 2019, he competed in the men's javelin throw at the 2019 World Athletics Championships in Doha, Qatar. He did not qualify to compete in the final. He also competed in the men's javelin throw at the 2017 World Championships in Athletics held in London, United Kingdom. In this competition he also did not qualify to compete in the final.

In 2018, he competed in the men's javelin throw at the 2018 European Athletics Championships held in Berlin, Germany.

He competed in the men's javelin throw event at the 2020 Summer Olympics held in Tokyo, Japan.
