= Reinhard van Zyl =

South African javelin thrower

Personal information
- Born: 4 February 1994 (age 32)

Sport
- Country: South Africa
- Sport: Athletics
- Event: Javelin throw

Achievements and titles
- Personal best: Javelin throw: 77.20 m (2017)

Reinhard van Zyl (born 4 February 1994) is a South African male javelin thrower, who won an individual gold medal at the Youth World Championships.
