= Dainis Dukurs =

Latvian skeleton coach (born 1957)

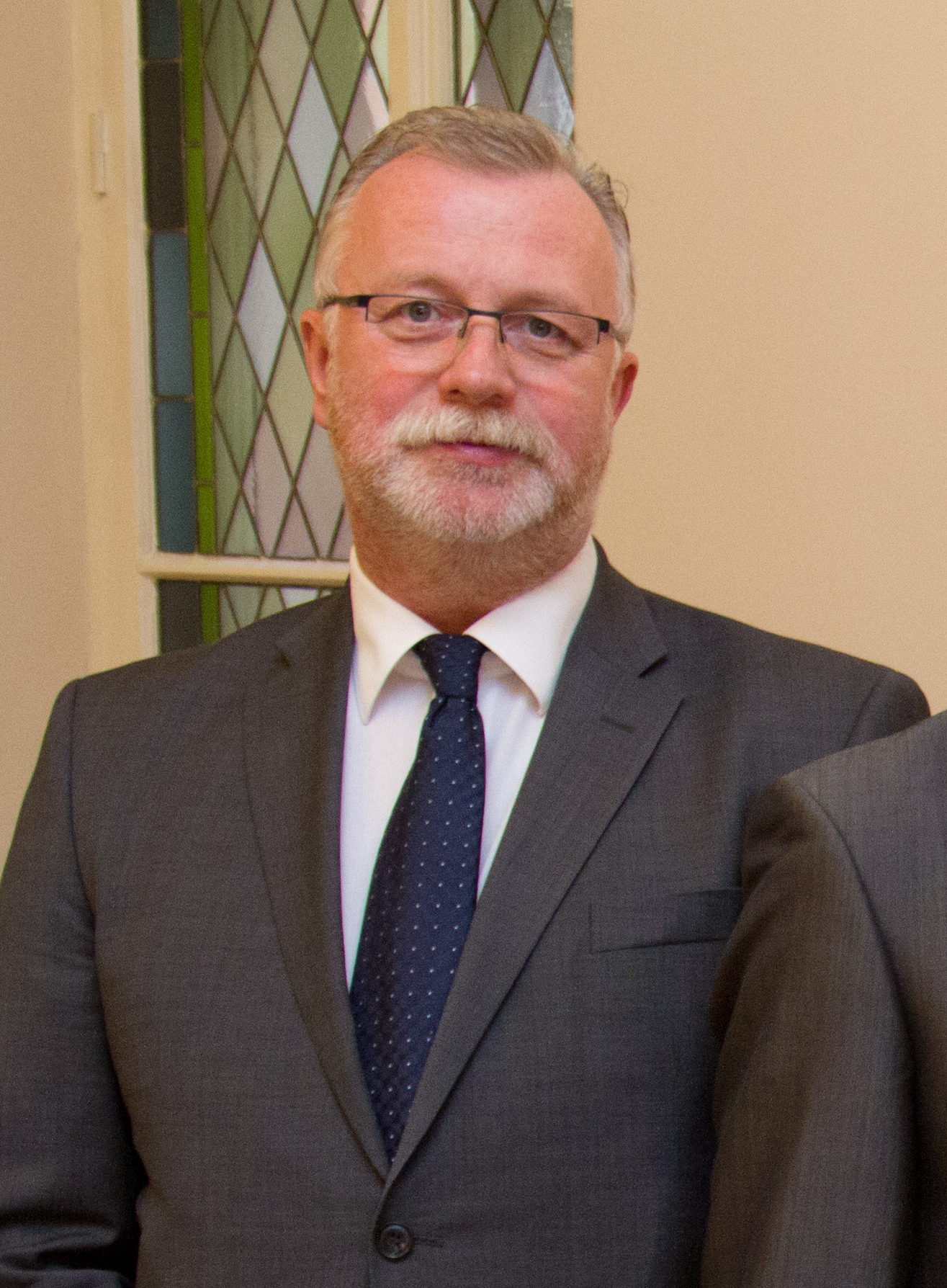
- Born: 24 January 1957 (age 69); Alūksne, Latvian SSR
- Occupation: skeleton coach

Dainis Dukurs (born 24 January 1957) is a Latvian retired bobsledder, manager of Sigulda bobsleigh, luge, and skeleton track, member of Sigulda municipal council and skeleton coach.

He was born in Alūksne. Dukurs was 1985 Latvian champion in bobsleigh with Jānis Skrastiņš. In 1984 he started to make bobsleigh equipment. Dukurs is coach for his sons Martins and Tomass.
