= Kacper Oleszczuk =

Polish javelin thrower

Personal information
- Born: 15 May 1994 (age 32) Pasłęk, Poland
- Height: 1.90 m (6 ft 3 in)
- Weight: 105 kg (231 lb)

Sport
- Sport: Athletics
- Event: Javelin throw
- Club: Polonia Pasłęk
- Coached by: Zbigniew Borysewicz
Medal record
Athletics
Representing Poland
European U23 Championships
Gold medal – first place	2015 Tallinn	Javelin throw

Kacper Oleszczuk (born 15 May 1994 in Pasłęk) is a Polish athlete specialising in the javelin throw. He won the gold medal at the 2015 European U23 Championships.

His personal best in the event is 82.29 metres set in Tallinn in 2015.

== International competitions ==
Year	Competition	Venue	Position	Event	Notes
Representing Poland
2011	World Youth Championships	Lille, France	14th (q)	Javelin throw (800g)	65.85 m
2012	World Junior Championships	Barcelona, Spain	37th (q)	Javelin throw	62.93 m
2013	European Junior Championships	Rieti, Italy	4th	Javelin throw	73.24 m
2015	European U23 Championships	Tallinn, Estonia	1st	Javelin throw	82.29 m
2016	European Championships	Amsterdam, Netherlands	8th	Javelin throw	79.34 m

== Seasonal bests by year ==
- 2012 - 71.42
- 2013 - 75.39
- 2014 - 77.46
- 2015 - 82.29
- 2016 - 80.97
