= Morné Moolman =

South African javelin thrower

Personal information
- Nationality: South Africa
- Born: 1 September 1994 (age 31)

Sport
- Sport: Track and field
- Event: Javelin throw

Achievements and titles
- Personal best: 76.29 (Barcelona 2012)
Medal record
Men's Athletics
Representing South Africa
World Junior Championships
Bronze medal – third place	2012 Barcelona	Javelin throw
World Youth Championships
Silver medal – second place	2011 Lille	Javelin throw

Morné Moolman (born 1 September 1994) is a South African javelin thrower.

Current K/D/A : 0/0/1
Moolman holds the South African Youth Record in javelin throw.
