= Zigismunds Sirmais =

Latvian javelin thrower

Personal information
- Nationality: Latvian
- Born: 6 May 1992 (age 34) Rīga, Latvia
- Height: 1.91 m (6 ft 3 in)
- Weight: 90 kg (198 lb)

Sport
- Country: Latvia
- Sport: Track and field
- Event: Javelin throw
- Coached by: Lina Muze

Achievements and titles
- Personal best: Javelin throw: 86.66 m (2016)
Medal record
European Championships
Gold medal – first place	2016 Amsterdam	Javelin throw
European Cup Winter Throwing
Gold medal – first place	2014 Leiria	Javelin throw

Zigismunds Sirmais (born 6 May 1992 in Riga) is a Latvian javelin thrower. Sirmais achieved his best result of 86.66 while winning the 2016 European Athletics Championships. He previously threw the world junior record of 84.69 m on 22 June 2011 in Bauska, Latvia. He is competing for the club Arkādija under coach Valentīna Eiduka.

== Seasonal bests by year ==
- 2009 – 65.03
- 2010 – 82.27
- 2011 – 84.69
- 2012 – 84.06
- 2013 – 82.77
- 2014 – 86.61
- 2015 – 79.37
- 2016 – 86.66

== Achievements ==
Year	Competition	Venue	Position	Notes
Representing Latvia
2010	World Junior Championships	Moncton, Canada	7th	73.38 m
2011	European Junior Championships	Tallinn, Estonia	1st	81.53 CR
2013	European U23 Championships	Tampere, Finland	1st	82.77 m
2016	European Championships	Amsterdam, Netherlands	1st	86.66 m PB
2016	Olympic Games	Rio de Janeiro, Brazil	14th (q)	80.65 m

Awards
Preceded by Artjoms Rudņevs	Latvian Rising Sportspersonality of the Year; 2011	Succeeded by Laura Ikauniece
